= McNeese Cowboys basketball statistical leaders =

The McNeese Cowboys basketball statistical leaders are individual statistical leaders of the McNeese Cowboys basketball program in various categories, including points, rebounds, assists, steals, and blocks. Within those areas, the lists identify single-game, single-season, and career leaders. The Cowboy represent the McNeese State University in the NCAA's Southland Conference.

McNeese began competing in intercollegiate basketball in 1945. However, the school's record book does not generally list records from before the 1950s, as records from before this period are often incomplete and inconsistent. Since scoring was much lower in this era, and teams played much fewer games during a typical season, it is likely that few or no players from this era would appear on these lists anyway.

The NCAA did not officially record assists as a stat until the 1983–84 season, and blocks and steals until the 1985–86 season, but McNeese's record books includes players in these stats before these seasons. These lists are updated through the end of the 2023–24 season.

== Scoring ==
Career
Rk	Player	Points	Seasons
1	Joe Dumars	2,607	1981–82 1982–83 1983–84 1984–85
2	Edmond Lawrence	1,986	1972–73 1973–74 1974–75 1975–76
3	Demond Mallet	1,941	1997–98 1998–99 1999–00 2000–01
4	David Lawrence	1,938	1976–77 1977–78 1978–79 1979–80
5	Henry Ray	1,902	1972–73 1973–74 1974–75
6	Anthony Pullard	1,767	1985–86 1987–88 1988–89 1989–90
7	Jerome Batiste	1,707	1983–84 1984–85 1985–86 1986–87
8	Michael Cutright	1,703	1985–86 1986–87 1987–88 1988–89
9	Christian Shumate	1,694	2021–22 2022–23 2023–24 2024–25
10	Tierre Brown	1,692	1997–98 1998–99 1999–00 2000–01

Season
Rk	Player	Points	Season
1	Bill Reigel	1,220	1955–56
2	Joe Dumars	819	1983–84
3	Joe Dumars	697	1984–85
4	Kevin Ross	689	1980–81
5	Demond Mallet	660	2000–01
6	Tierre Brown	623	2000–01
7	Michael Cutright	616	1988–89
8	Jerome Batiste	613	1986–87
9	Clyde Briley	608	1964–65
10	Edmond Lawrence	606	1975–76

Single game
Rk	Player	Points	Season	Opponent
1	Bill Reigel	57	1955–56	SE Louisiana
2	Bill Reigel	53	1955–56	NE Louisiana
3	Michael Cutright	51	1988–89	Stephen F. Austin
4	Bill Reigel	47	1955–56	NE Louisiana
	Bill Reigel	47	1955–56	Louisiana College
6	Bill Reigel	44	1955–56	Northwestern State
7	Bill Reigel	43	1955–56	Centenary
	Bill Reigel	43	1954–55	Northwestern State
9	Joe Dumars	42	1984–85	Texas Southern
	Bill Reigel	42	1955–56	Southwest Texas
	Bill Reigel	42	1955–56	Central (Ohio)
	Bill Reigel	42	1954–55	Louisiana College

== Rebounds ==
Career
Rk	Player	Rebounds	Seasons
1	Edmond Lawrence	1,212	1972–73 1973–74 1974–75 1975–76
2	John Rudd	1,181	1974–75 1975–76 1976–77 1977–78
3	Christian Shumate	1,102	2021–22 2022–23 2023–24 2024–25
4	David Lawrence	1,026	1976–77 1977–78 1978–79 1979–80
5	Frank Glenn	963	1955–56 1956–57 1957–58
6	Desharick Guidry	932	2011–12 2012–13 2013–14 2014–15
7	Henry Ray	883	1972–73 1973–74 1974–75
8	P.J. Alawoya	830	2007–08 2008–09 2009–10 2010–11
9	Jerome Batiste	808	1983–84 1984–85 1985–86 1986–87
10	Chris Hardin	803	1981–82 1982–83 1983–84 1984–85

Season
Rk	Player	Rebounds	Season
1	Frank Glenn	451	1955–56
2	Frank Glenn	353	1956–57
3	Desharick Guidry	346	2014–15
4	David Lawrence	343	1978–79
5	Shamarkus Kennedy	339	2019–20
6	Edmond Lawrence	336	1975–76
7	Christian Shumate	330	2022–23
	P.J. Alawoya	330	2010–11
9	John Rudd	328	1975–76
10	Christian Shumate	324	2023–24

Single game
Rk	Player	Rebounds	Season	Opponent
1	Henry Ray	27	1973–74	UTA
2	John Rudd	26	1975–76	Rice
	Edmond Lawrence	26	1972–73	Lamar
	Frank Glenn	26	1956–57	Arkansas A&M
5	David Lawrence	24	1978–79	Lamar
6	Anthony Pullard	22	1989–90	North Texas
	David Lawrence	22	1978–79	Lamar
	Frank Glenn	22	1955–56	Sam Houston State
	David Lawrence	22	1978–79	Dayton
10	Christian Shumate	21	2023–24	UAB
	Shamarkus Kennedy	21	2019–20	Central Arkansas
	Fred Chaffould	21	1982–83	UTSA
	Edmond Lawrence	21	1975–76	South Alabama
	John Rudd	21	1974–75	Louisiana Tech
	John Rudd	21	1974–75	Louisiana Tech
	George Murphy	21	1970–71	ULM
	George Boyd	21	1967–68	Nicholls

== Assists ==
Career
Rk	Player	Assists	Seasons
1	David Green	605	1980–81 1981–82 1982–83 1983–84
2	Girard Harmon	446	1982–83 1983–84 1984–85 1985–86
3	Kevin Hardy	429	2011–12 2012–13 2013–14 2014–15
4	Chauncey Bryant	381	1998–99 1999–00 2000–01 2001–02
5	John Ford	372	2004–05 2005–06 2006–07 2007–08
6	Jamaya Burr	361	2013–14 2014–15 2015–16 2016–17
7	Tierre Brown	360	1997–98 1998–99 1999–00 2000–01
8	Joe Dumars	330	1981–82 1982–83 1983–84 1984–85
9	C.J. Collins	321	2007–08 2008–09 2009–10 2010–11
10	Eldridge Lewis	317	2000–01 2001–02 2002–03 2003–04

Season
Rk	Player	Assists	Season
1	Girard Harmon	243	1985–86
2	David Green	218	1980–81
3	Pointer Williams	200	1995–96
4	Girard Harmon	184	1984–85
5	David Green	162	1983–84
6	Quadir Copeland	156	2024–25
7	Shahada Wells	155	2023–24
	Paul Curtis	155	1994–95
9	Chauncey Bryant	152	2001–02
10	Garwey Dual	148	2025–26

Single game
Rk	Player	Assists	Season	Opponent
1	Girard Harmon	14	1985–86	Lamar
	Girard Harmon	14	1985–86	St. Mary's, TX
	David Green	14	1980–81	Oklahoma A&S
	Glen Hanks	14	1975–76	Arkansas State
5	David Green	13	1980–81	Oklahoma City
	Omar Cooper	13	2024–25	College of Biblical Studies
7	Dellquan Warren	12	2026–27	College of Biblical Studies
	A.J. Lawson	12	2020–21	Southeastern La
	Pointer Williams	12	1995–96	Louisville
	Girard Harmon	12	1985–86	Northwestern State
	David Green	12	1983–84	Southern

== Steals ==
Career
Rk	Player	Steals	Seasons
1	Kevin Hardy	241	2011–12 2012–13 2013–14 2014–15
2	Demond Mallet	224	1997–98 1998–99 1999–00 2000–01
3	Joe Dumars	188	1981–82 1982–83 1983–84 1984–85
4	John Ford	177	2004–05 2005–06 2006–07 2007–08
5	Chauncey Bryant	169	1998–99 1999–00 2000–01 2001–02
6	Tierre Brown	168	1997–98 1998–99 1999–00 2000–01
7	David Green	167	1980–81 1981–82 1982–83 1983–84
8	Michael Cutright	151	1985–86 1986–87 1987–88 1988–89
9	Javohn Garcia	148	2023–24 2024–25 2025–26
10	Chris Faggi	139	1978–79 1979–80 1980–81 1981–82

Season
Rk	Player	Steals	Season
1	Pointer Williams	118	1995–96
2	Shahada Wells	98	2023–24
3	Kevin Hardy	85	2014–15
4	Mike Marshall	82	1985–86
5	Kevin Hardy	69	2012–13
6	Chauncey Bryant	68	2001–02
7	Demond Mallet	66	2000–01
8	Demond Mallet	65	1998–99
	Franklin Paul	65	1998–99
10	Kevin Hardy	62	2013–14
	Rosell Ellis	62	1996–97

Single game
Rk	Player	Steals	Season	Opponent
1	Kevin Hardy	8	2014–15	Central Arkansas
2	Larry Johnson	7	2025–26	UT Rio Grande Valley
	Franklin Paul	7	1997–98	Southeastern La
	Franklin Paul	7	1997–98	Colorado State
	Pointer Williams	7	1995–96	UC-Irivine
	Fab Flournoy	7	1993–94	Lamar
	Joe Dumars	7	1984–85	North Texas

== Blocks ==
Career
Rk	Player	Blocks	Seasons
1	Edmond Lawrence	311	1972–73 1973–74 1974–75 1975–76
2	Kleon Penn	267	2006–07 2007–08 2008–09
3	David Lawrence	166	1976–77 1977–78 1978–79 1979–80
4	Martin Yokum	165	1990–91 1992–93 1993–94
5	Austin Lewis	163	2012–13 2013–14 2014–15 2015–16
6	Christian Shumate	145	2021–22 2022–23 2023–24 2024–25
7	Shamarkus Kennedy	140	2018–19 2019–20
	Fred Gentry	140	1998–99 1999–00 2000–01 2001–02
9	Raynell Brewer	138	2000–01 2001–02
10	Adrian Johnson	129	1998–99 1999–00 2000–01 2001–02 2002–03

Season
Rk	Player	Blocks	Season
1	Kleon Penn	117	2007–08
2	Edmond Lawrence	106	1972–73
3	Kleon Penn	102	2008–09
4	Shamarkus Kennedy	81	2019–20
	Edmond Lawrence	81	1975–76
6	Raynell Brewer	70	2001–02
7	Raynell Brewer	68	2000–01
8	David Lawrence	66	1978–79
9	Martin Yokum	65	1992–93
10	Austin Lewis	64	2014–15

Single game
Rk	Player	Blocks	Season	Opponent
1	Austin Lewis	11	2014–15	Louisiana College
2	Shamarkus Kennedy	10	2019–20	Kansas City
3	Kleon Penn	9	2007–08	Lamar
4	Kleon Penn	8	2007–08	Texas State
	Kleon Penn	8	2007–08	Florida Atlantic
	Kleon Penn	8	2007–08	UT-Tyler
7	Austin Lewis	7	2014–15	Jarvis Christian
8	Austin Lewis	6	2014–15	Southeastern La
	Edmond Lawrence	6	1975–76	South Alabama
	Edmond Lawrence	6	1975–76	Texas-Arlington
	Edmond Lawrence	6	1974–75	Southeastern La
	Edmond Lawrence	6	1974–75	Northeast Louisiana
	Edmond Lawrence	6	1974–75	Oral Roberts
