= David Lawrence (basketball) =

American basketball player

Personal information
- Born: May 5, 1959 Rayne, Louisiana, U.S.
- Died: March 20, 2017 (aged 57) Milan, Italy
- Listed height: 6 ft 9 in (2.06 m)
- Listed weight: 210 lb (95 kg)

Career information
- High school: W. O. Boston (Lake Charles, Louisiana)
- College: McNeese State (1976–1980)
- NBA draft: 1980: 2nd round, 32nd overall pick
- Drafted by: Portland Trail Blazers
- Playing career: 1980–1989
- Position: Power forward

Career history
- 1980–1981: Trieste
- 1981–1982: Donar Groningen
- 1982–1983: EBBC Den Bosch
- 1983–1986: Grifone Perugia
- 1986–1987: Basket Mestre
- 1987–1988: Saski Baskonia
- 1988–1989: Corona Cremona

Career highlights
- DBL MVP (1983); Southland Player of the Year (1979); 2× First-team All-Southland (1979, 1980)
- Stats at Basketball Reference

David Lawrence (May 5, 1959 – March 20, 2017) was an American basketball player. He was a star college player at McNeese State University, a second round draft pick in the 1980 NBA draft, and played professionally in Europe for nine seasons.

Lawrence, a 6'9" power forward from W. O. Boston High School in Lake Charles, Louisiana, played for McNeese State from 1976 to 1980, following his brother Edmund to the school. Over four years, he scored 1,938 points and grabbed 1,026 rebounds. He was named first-team All-Southland Conference and was the Southland Conference Player of the Year as a junior in 1979.

Following his college career, Lawrence was drafted in the second round (32nd pick overall) of the 1980 NBA draft by the Portland Trail Blazers. Though he never played in the National Basketball Association (NBA), he played for nine years in the top leagues of Italy, Spain and the Netherlands.

Lawrence died on March 20, 2017.
