= Damon Harrison =

American football player (born 1988)

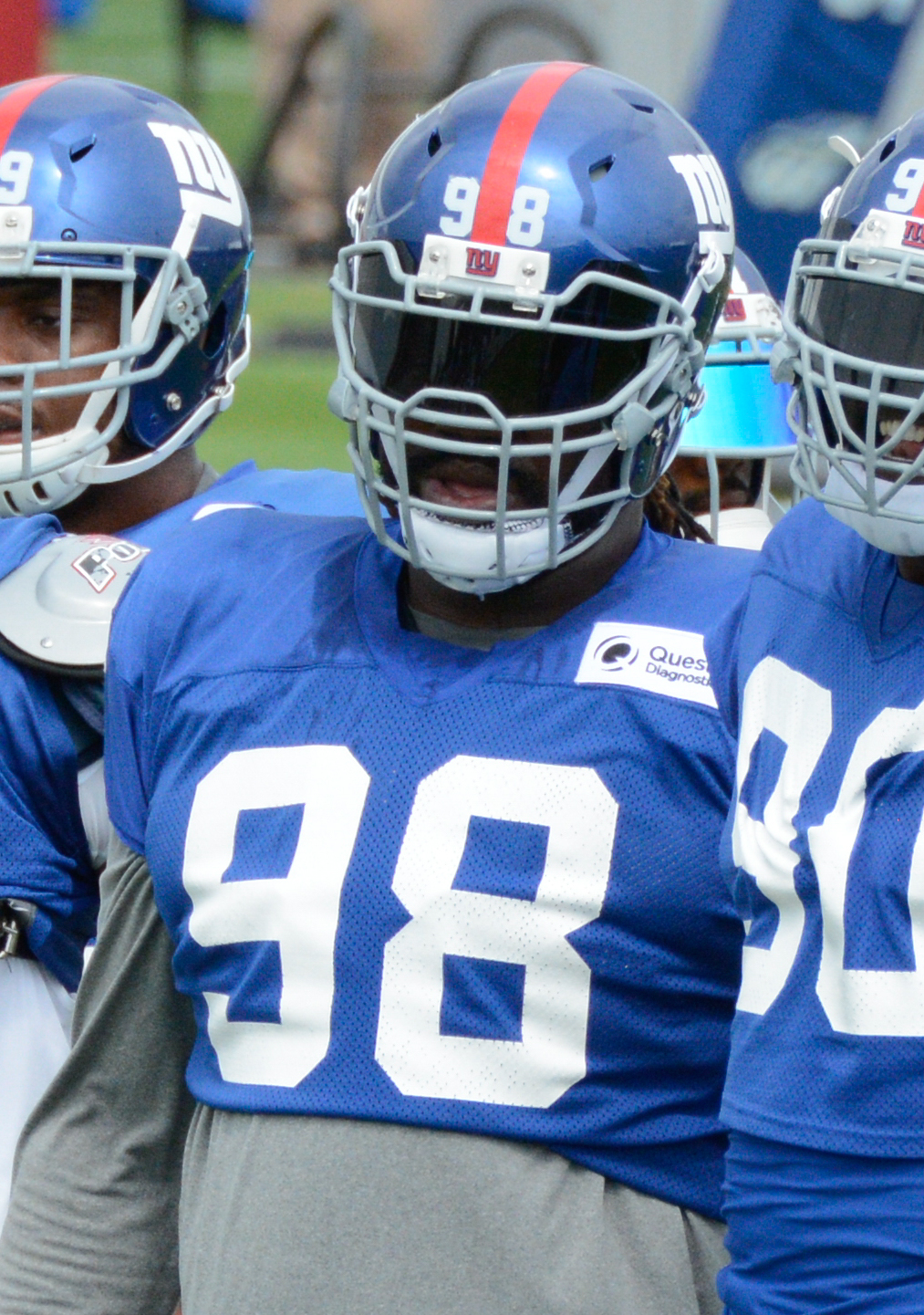
- Harrison (number 98) with the New York Giants in 2016

No. 71, 94, 98, 78, 59
- Position: Defensive tackle

Personal information
- Born: November 29, 1988 (age 37); New Iberia, Louisiana, U.S.
- Listed height: 6 ft 4 in (1.93 m)
- Listed weight: 350 lb (159 kg)

Career information
- High school: Lake Charles-Boston (Lake Charles, Louisiana)
- College: Northwest Mississippi CC (2007); William Penn (2008–2011)
- NFL draft: 2012: undrafted

Career history
- New York Jets (2012–2015); New York Giants (2016–2018); Detroit Lions (2018–2019); Seattle Seahawks (2020); Green Bay Packers (2020)

Awards and highlights
- First-team All-Pro (2016); First-team All-MSFA (2011); Second-team All-MSFA (2009, 2010)

Career NFL statistics
- Total tackles: 494
- Sacks: 11.0
- Forced fumbles: 5
- Fumble recoveries: 1
- Pass deflections: 10
- Interceptions: 1
- Stats at Pro Football Reference

Damon Paul Harrison (born November 29, 1988) is an American former professional football player who was a defensive tackle in the National Football League (NFL). He played college football for the William Penn Statesmen and was signed by the New York Jets as an undrafted free agent in 2012. Harrison was also a member of the New York Giants, Detroit Lions, Seattle Seahawks and Green Bay Packers. According to Pro Football Focus, he led the league in run-stop percentage between 2013 and 2016.

== Early life ==
Harrison was born in New Iberia, Louisiana on November 29, 1988. He attended Lake Charles Boston High School, where he primarily played shooting guard on the school's basketball varsity team. On November 29, 2005, during his junior season, he injured the meniscus in his left knee, and gained "like 40 or 50 pounds" over the next two months.

He decided to take on football for his senior year, playing both offensive and defensive line, and was an all-district and all-Southwest Louisiana selection in 2006. He was also named as the team captain and was selected as Lake Charles Boston's Offensive MVP and Defensive MVP along with being selected as the Lake Charles Boston's Offensive Lineman of the Year.

Since much of recruiting takes place during a high school player's junior season, Harrison was overlooked by college scouts and wound up without any scholarship offers after his graduation. He enrolled at Northwest Mississippi Community College, but dropped out after the first semester to work as a night stocker at Walmart in Lake Charles. However, he was later recruited and offered a football scholarship to William Penn University, in Oskaloosa, Iowa, an NAIA school, by former NMCC assistant coach Steve Miller.

== College career ==
In his first year at William Penn, Harrison finished fifth on the team in tackles. As a sophomore and junior, he was voted second-team all-conference. During his senior season, he was recognized as first-team all-conference, after posting 3.5 sacks and 8.5 tackles for losses among his team-high 60 tackles. Throughout his college career, he started all 44 games he played at William Penn.

== Professional career ==
=== Pre-draft ===
Prior to the draft, Harrison worked out at Iowa State's pro day, and was "considered a late-round prospect in a weak class of nose tackle." The last player to have been selected from William Penn in the NFL Draft was Andy Stokes in 2005, who was taken by the New England Patriots with the final pick, and their last player to appear in an NFL game was Warren Loving in 1987.

Pre-draft measurables
Height	Weight	Arm length	Hand span	40-yard dash	10-yard split	20-yard split	20-yard shuttle	Three-cone drill	Vertical jump	Broad jump	Bench press
6 ft 2 5/8 in (1.90 m)	339 lb (154 kg)	33 in (0.84 m)	10 in (0.25 m)	5.54 s	1.91 s	3.14 s	4.99 s	7.80 s	25 in (0.64 m)	7 ft 9 in (2.36 m)	34 reps
All values from Iowa State pro day (March 20, 2012)

After receiving a seventh-round grade by Jeff Bauer, Jets' director of college scouting, Harrison went undrafted in the 2012 NFL draft. Right after the draft, he was called by twelve NFL teams to join their practice camp squads.

=== New York Jets ===
Harrison was signed by the New York Jets as an undrafted free agent on April 29, 2012. He appeared in 5 games in 2012 but did not record a single stat that year. Following the departure of Sione Pouha and a preseason injury to Kenrick Ellis, Harrison was named the starting defensive tackle for the 2013 season. On October 20, 2013, Harrison recorded his first career sack when he brought down New England Patriots quarterback Tom Brady. During the 2013 season, Harrison started all 16 games making 66 tackles, 2 passes defended, and 1 sack. In 2014, Harrison again started all 16 games with 55 tackles. In 2015, Harrison again started all 16 games making 72 tackles, 0.5 sacks, and a forced fumble.

=== New York Giants ===
Harrison signed with the New York Giants on March 9, 2016, to a 5-year contract worth $9.25 million per year with $24 million guaranteed and $30 million over the first three years. With the Giants, Harrison was selected to be in the first-team All-Pro by the Associated Press on January 6, 2017. He was also ranked 96th on the NFL Top 100 Players of 2017.

=== Detroit Lions ===
On October 24, 2018, Harrison was traded to the Detroit Lions for a conditional 2019 fifth-round draft pick. The condition was that the Lions would give either their own 2019 5th round pick or the 5th round pick that was previously acquired from the San Francisco 49ers in a trade for Laken Tomlinson, depending on which is higher. Because he was traded to the Lions before the Giants bye week and after the Lions bye week, Harrison played in 17 games during the 2018 season, the first defensive lineman to accomplish this feat.

On August 21, 2019, Harrison signed a one-year, $11 million contract extension with the Lions, keeping him under contract through the 2021 season.

On February 21, 2020, Harrison was released by the Lions.

=== Seattle Seahawks ===
On October 7, 2020, Harrison was signed to the Seattle Seahawks practice squad. He was elevated to the active roster on November 14 and 19 for the team's weeks 10 and 11 games against the Los Angeles Rams and Arizona Cardinals, and reverted to the practice squad after each game. He was promoted to the active roster on November 23. After being a healthy scratch in week 16 against the Los Angeles Rams, Harrison requested to be released and the team waived him on December 28, 2020.

=== Green Bay Packers ===
On December 30, 2020, Harrison was claimed off waivers by the Green Bay Packers.

=== Retirement ===
On November 13, 2021, Harrison announced his retirement from the NFL after nine seasons.

== NFL career statistics ==
=== Regular season ===
Season	Team	GP	GS	Comb	Total	Ast	Sck	FF	FR	PD
2012	NYJ	5	0	0	0	0	0	0	0	0
2013	NYJ	16	16	66	36	30	1.0	0	0	2
2014	NYJ	16	16	55	30	25	0	0	0	0
2015	NYJ	16	16	72	39	33	0.5	1	0	0
2016	NYG	16	16	86	55	31	2.5	1	0	1
2017	NYG	16	16	76	51	25	1.5	0	0	3
2018	NYG	7	7	31	15	16	0	1	0	0
2018	DET	10	9	50	37	13	0	1	1	1
2019	DET	15	15	49	29	20	2.0	0	0	3
2020	SEA	6	0	9	3	6	0	1	0	0
2020	GB	1	0	0	0	0	0	0	0	0
Total		124	111	494	295	199	11.0	5	1	10
Source: NFL.com

=== Postseason ===
Season	Team	GP	GS	Comb	Total	Ast	Sck	FF	FR	PD
2016	NYG	1	1	5	4	1	0	0	0	0
2020	GB	2	0	1	0	1	0	0	0	0
Total		3	1	6	4	2	0	0	0	0
Source: pro-football-reference.com

== Personal life ==
Harrison is married to Alexis Harrison. They have seven children. He has been a resident of Washington Township, Bergen County, New Jersey.

He goes by the nickname "Snacks".
