= List of schools in Lake Charles, Louisiana =

List of schools in Lake Charles, Louisiana, United States:

== Colleges and universities ==
- McNeese State University offers both graduate and undergraduate degrees.

== Vocational and technological schools ==
- Delta School of Business and Technology
- Sowela Technical Community College

== Public elementary education ==
- A.A. Nelson Elementary School
- Barbe Elementary School
- Brentwood Elementary School
- College Oaks Elementary School
- Cypress Cove Elementary School
- Dolby Elementary School
- Fairview Elementary School
- Henry Heights Elementary School
- Jessie D. Clifton Elementary
- J.J. Johnson Elementary School
- Pearl Watson Elementary School
- Prien Lake Elementary School
- T.S. Cooley Elementary Magnet School
- Westwood Elementary School
- M.J. Kaufman Elementary School
- St.John Elementary School
- Combre-Fondel Elementary School
- Western Heights Elementary School
- Vincent Settlement Elementary

== Public middle school education ==
- Forrest K. White Middle School
- Oak Park Middle School
- Ray D. Molo Middle School
- Reynaud Middle School
- S.J. Welsh Middle School

== Private K-8 education ==
- Bishop Noland Episcopal Day School
- Hamilton Christian Academy
- Immaculate Conception Cathedral School
- Covenant Grace Academy
- Our Lady Queen of Heaven Catholic School
- St. Margaret's of Scotland Catholic School

== Public high school education ==
- Alfred M. Barbe High School
- LaGrange High School
- Washington Marion Magnet High School
- W. O. Boston High School

== Private high school education institutions ==
- Hamilton Christian Academy
- St. Louis Catholic High School
- Bishop Noland Episcopal Day School

== Others ==
- Lake Charles Boston Academy of Learning
- Lake Charles Charter Academy (K-8)
- Southwest Louisiana Charter Academy (K-8)
- Lake Charles College Prep (9-12)

== Christian schools ==
- Bishop Noland Episcopal Day School
- Covenant Grace Academy
