= McNeese Cowboys and Cowgirls =

Intercollegiate sports teams of McNeese State University

- University: McNeese State University
- Conference: Southland Conference
- NCAA: Division I (FCS)
- Athletic director: Heath Schroyer
- Location: Lake Charles, Louisiana
- Varsity teams: 13
- Football stadium: Navarre Stadium
- Basketball arena: Townsley Law Arena
- Baseball stadium: Joe Miller Ballpark
- Softball stadium: Joe Miller Field at Cowgirl Diamond
- Soccer stadium: Cowgirl Field
- Other venues: Henning Track and Field Complex; Nancy Hank Tennis Center; Ralph O. Ward Memorial Arena
- Mascot: Rowdy
- Nickname: Cowboys and Cowgirls
- Fight song: "On McNeese" and "Jole Blon"
- Colors: Royal blue and gold
- Website: mcneesesports.com

The McNeese Cowboys and Cowgirls are composed of 14 teams representing McNeese State University in intercollegiate athletics, including men's and women's basketball, cross country, golf, and track and field. Men's sports include baseball and football. Women's sports include volleyball, tennis, soccer, and softball. The Cowboys and Cowgirls compete in NCAA Division I, with Cowboys football competing in the Football Championship Subdivision (FCS), and are members of the Southland Conference.

== Sports sponsored ==
Men's sports	Women's sports
Baseball	Basketball
Basketball	Beach Volleyball
Cross country	Cross country
Football	Soccer
Track and Field^{1}	Softball
	Tennis
	Track and Field^{1}
	Volleyball
^{1} – Track and Field includes both indoor and outdoor

=== Baseball ===
The team represents McNeese State University in Lake Charles, Louisiana. The team is a member of the Southland Conference, which is part of the NCAA Division I. The team plays its home games at Joe Miller Ballpark.

=== Men's basketball ===
The team represents McNeese State University in Lake Charles, Louisiana. The school's team currently competes in the Southland Conference, which is part of the NCAA Division I. The team plays its home games at The Legacy Center (known before August 2021 as the Health and Human Performance Education Complex).

=== Women's basketball ===
The team represents McNeese State University in Lake Charles, Louisiana. The school's team currently competes in the Southland Conference, which is part of the NCAA Division I. Like the Cowboys, the Cowgirls play home games at The Legacy Center.

=== Football ===
The team represents McNeese State University located in Lake Charles, Louisiana. The team competes in the Southland Conference, which is part of Division I FCS. The team plays its home games at Cowboy Stadium.

=== Softball ===
The team represents McNeese State University located in Lake Charles, Louisiana. The team competes in the Southland Conference, which is part of the NCAA Division I. The team plays its home games at Joe Miller Field at Cowboy Diamond.

== Athletics venues ==
Venue	Sport	Opened	Ref.
Cowboy Stadium	Football	1965	
Joe Miller Ballpark	Baseball	1953	
Legacy Center	Basketball	2018	
Cowgirl Field	Soccer	n/a	
Joe Miller Field	Softball	2003	
Ralph O. Ward Complex	Track and field	1939	

=== Gallery ===
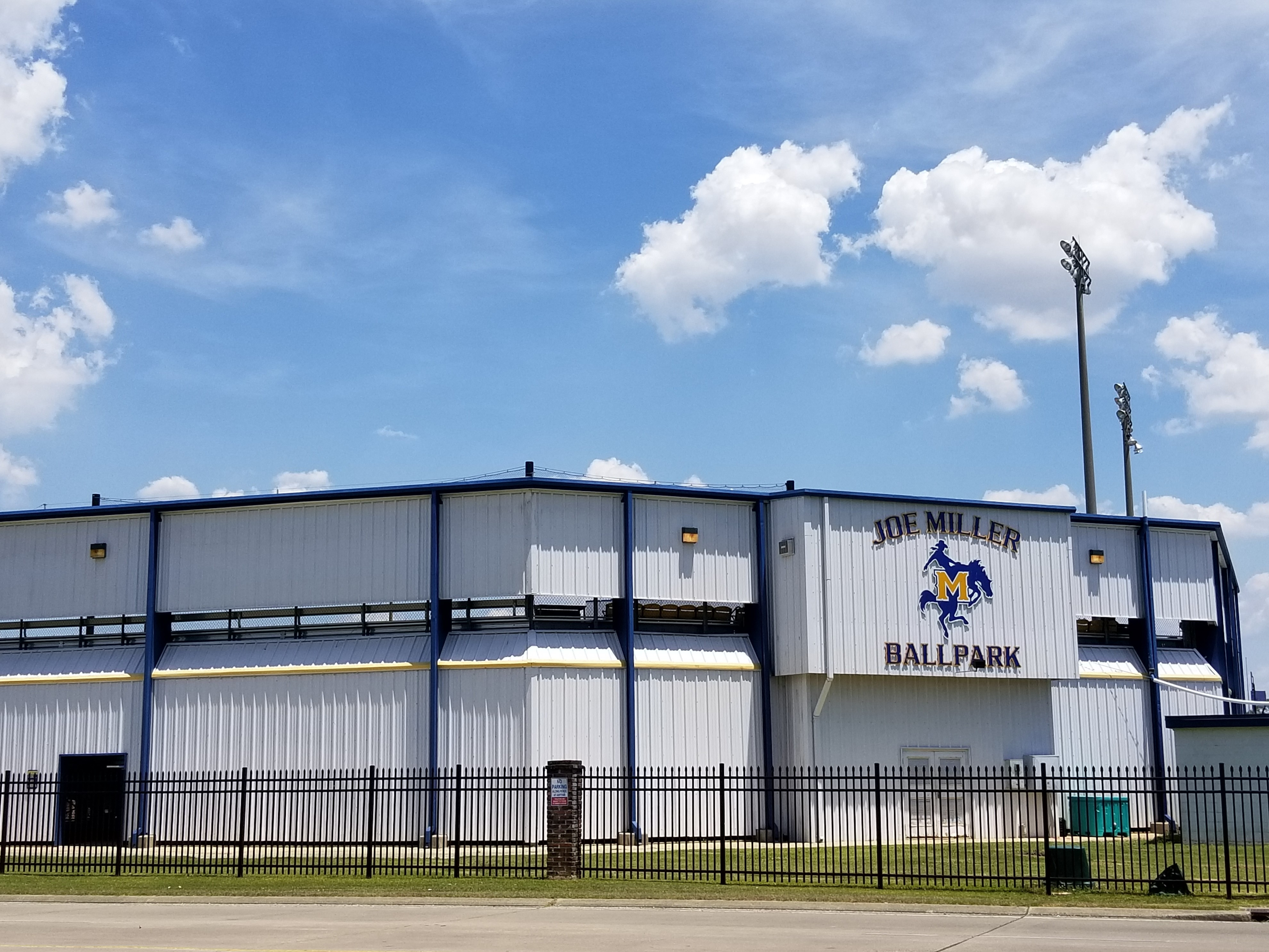
Joe Miller Ballpark

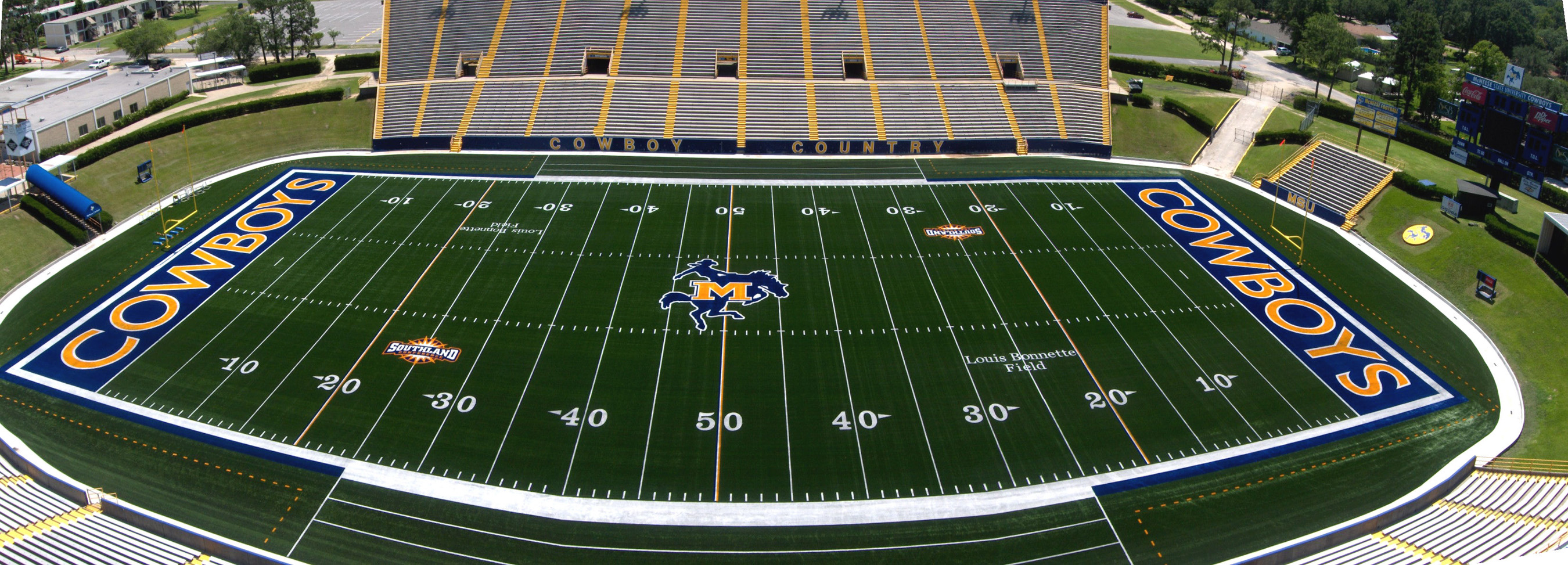
Cowboy Stadium

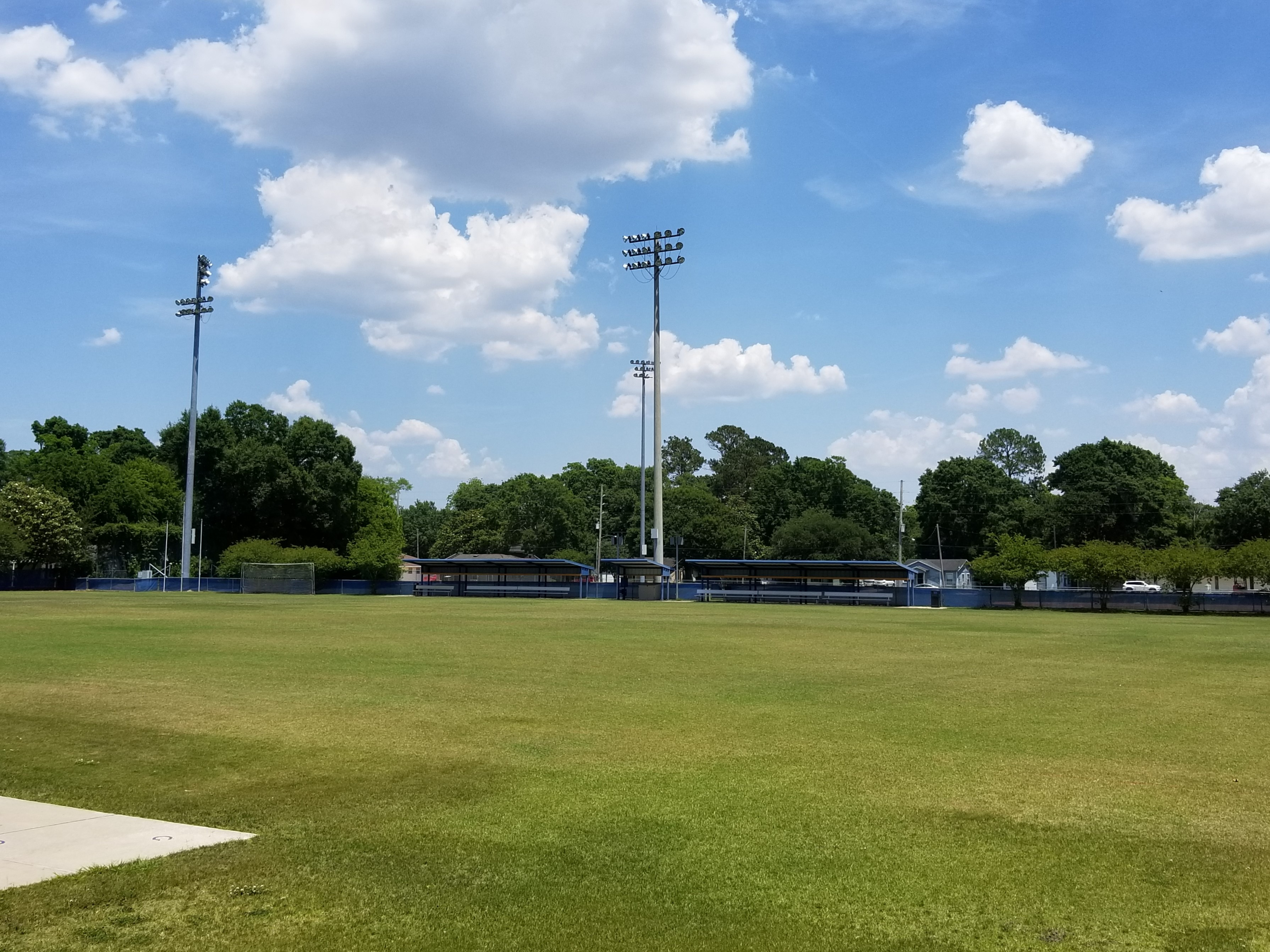
Cowgirl Field

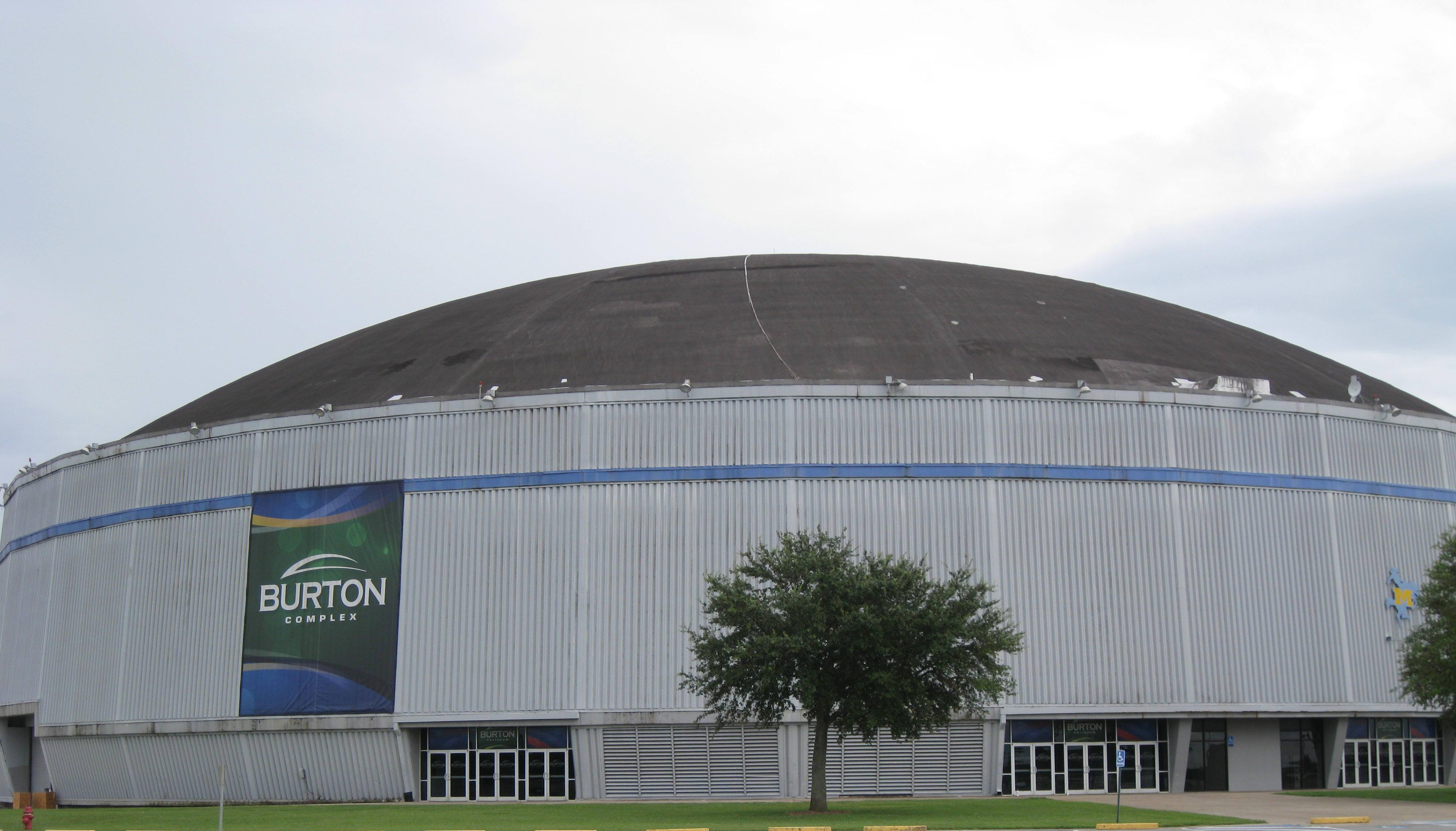
Burton Complex

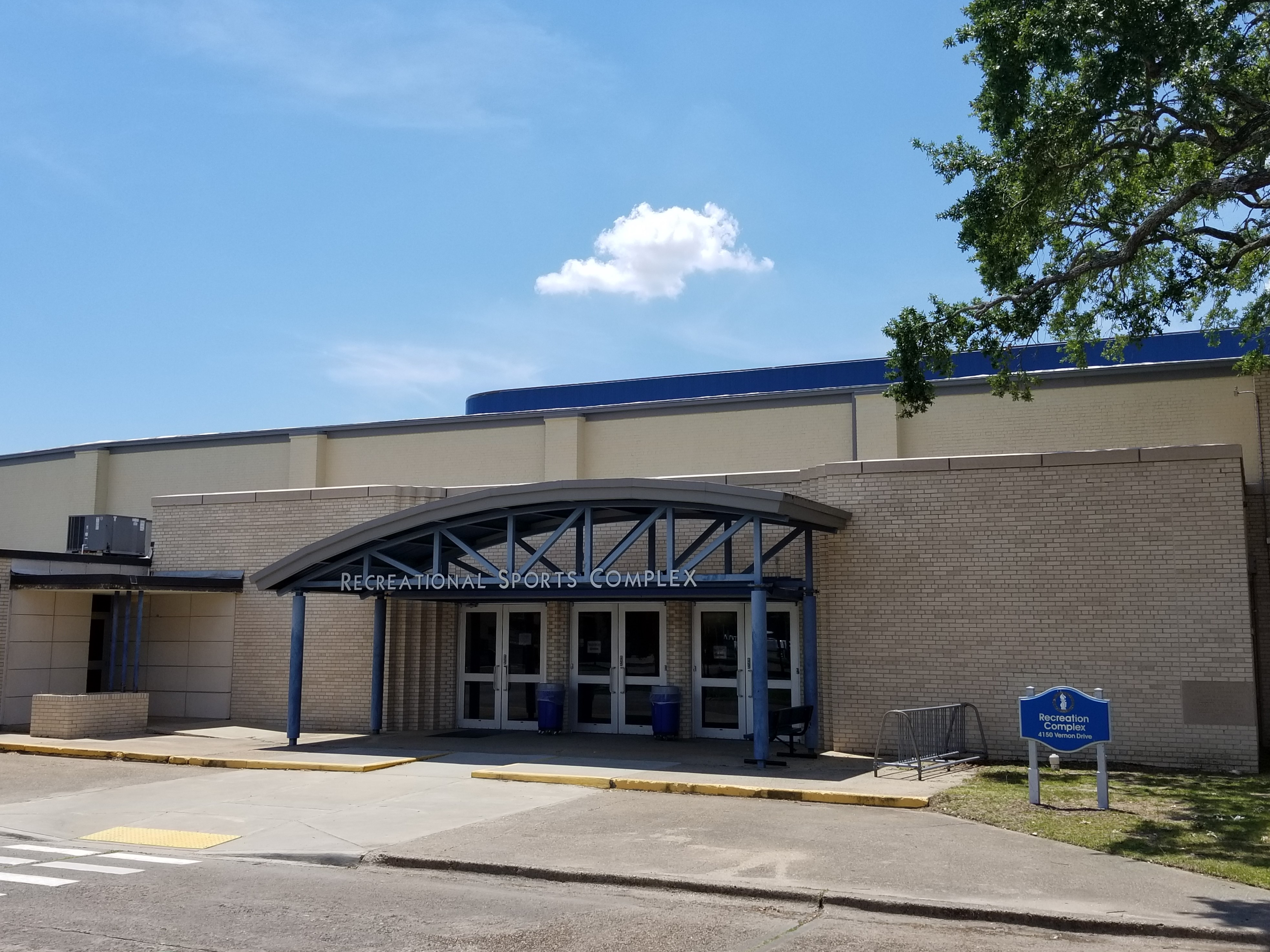
Recreational Sports Complex

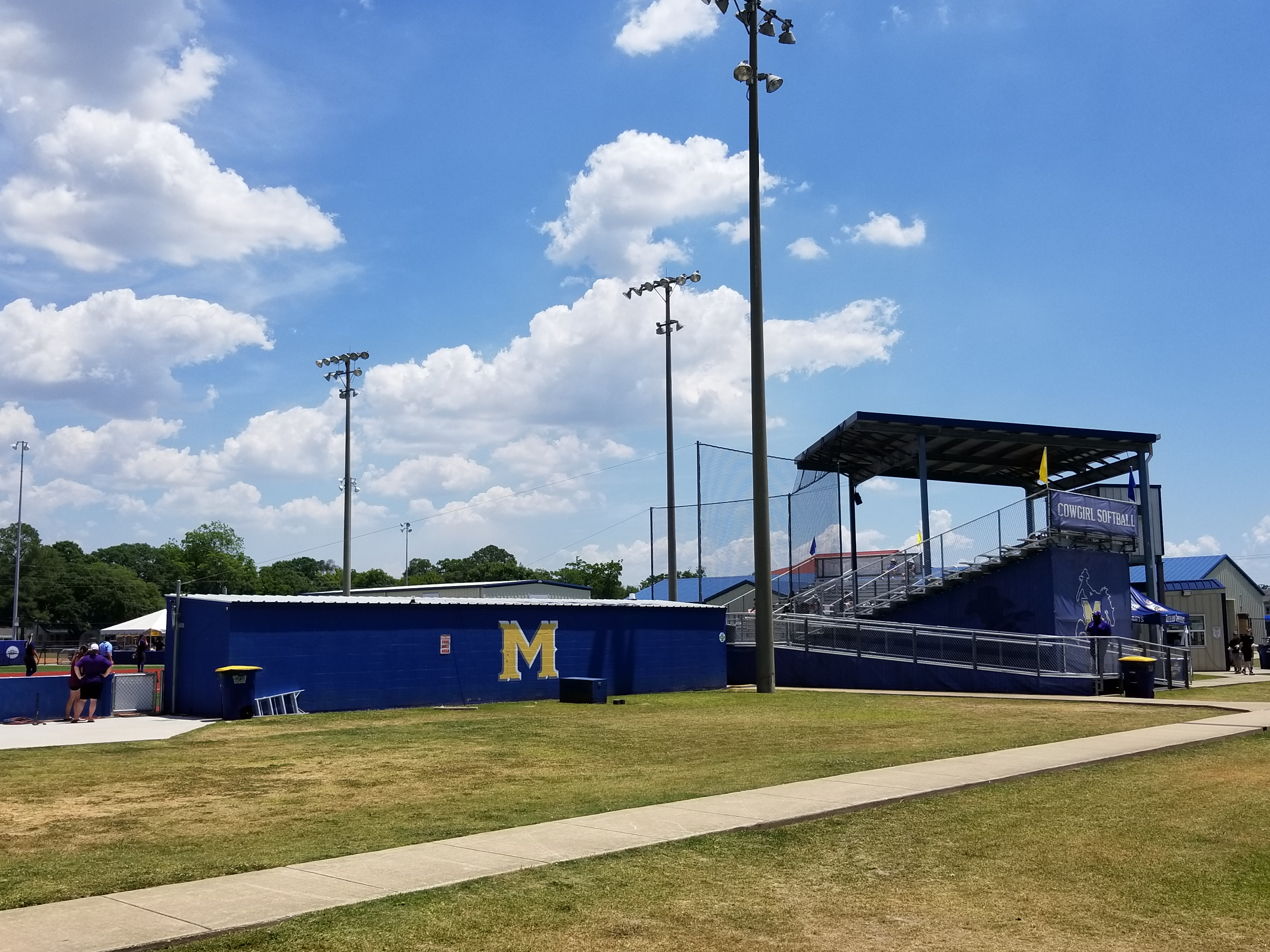
Joe Miller Field

== See also ==
- List of NCAA Division I institutions
