= W. O. Boston High School =

Public school in Lake Charles, Louisiana, U.S.

William Oscar Boston High School

Location
- 600 South Shattuck Street; Lake Charles, (Calcasieu Parish), Louisiana 70601; United States
- Coordinates: 30.2307°N 93.1969°W

Information
- Type: Public high school
- Established: 1949
- Closed: 1983
- Colors: Red and white
- Nickname: Panthers

W. O. Boston High School was an American public high school in Lake Charles, Louisiana. Originally Second Ward Colored School, it was renamed in honor of William Oscar Boston. Opened in 1949 as a segregated school for Blacks, it was renamed from Second Ward Colored School, which had been in the community since the late 19th century. W. O. Boston's first principal was Ralph C. Reynaud.

W.O. Boston and his wife, Mary, circa 1939

In sports, the W. O. Boston Panthers won three state titles in 1972 in boys basketball, girls track and field, and football.

In 1983, the school merged with Lake Charles High School to form Lake Charles-Boston High School. At the time, W. O. Boston was predominantly Black, while Lake Charles was racially relatively even. The school board supported the merger to eliminate a one-race school. Blacks opposed it, contending that it destroyed Calcasieu Parish's best example of racial balance. The resulting Lake Charles-Boston was 78.2 percent Black and 21.8 percent White. Blacks also disagreed that Barbe High School, which was predominantly White, was largely unaffected by the board's desegregation plan.

== Notable alumni ==
- Jim Griffin, football player
- Charlie Joiner, member of the Pro Football Hall of Fame
- David Lawrence, basketball player
- Edmund Lawrence, basketball player
- Wilbert Rideau, convicted killer and journalist

== See also ==
- List of former high schools in Louisiana
- List of schools in Lake Charles, Louisiana
