= Ralph O. Ward Memorial Arena =

Multi-purpose arena in Lake Charles, Louisiana

Ralph O. Ward Memorial Arena at McNeese State Recreational Sports Complex
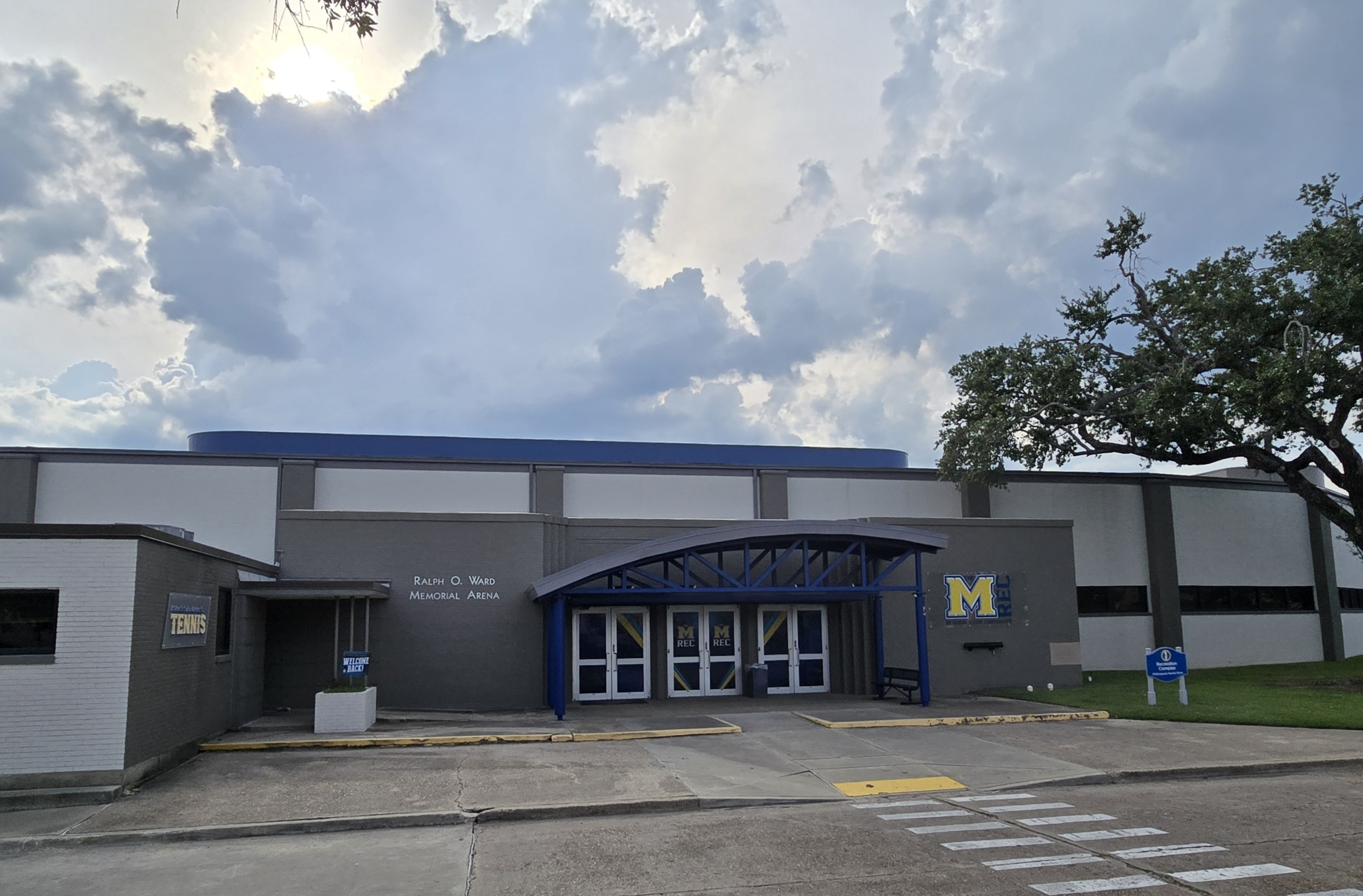
- Interactive map of Ralph O. Ward Memorial Arena at McNeese State Recreational Sports Complex
- Former names: McNeese Arena (1939–1989); Ralph O. Ward Memorial Arena (1990–2000)
- Location: Lake Charles, Louisiana
- Coordinates: 30.181805°N 93.215368°W
- Owner: McNeese State University
- Operator: McNeese State University
- Capacity: 5,000

Construction
- Opened: 1939
- Renovated: 1982
- Expanded: 2001

Tenants
- Men's indoor track and field Women's indoor track and field McNeese State Cowboys basketball (1956–1971)

Ralph O. Ward Memorial Arena formerly McNeese Arena is a 5,000 seat multi-purpose arena located in the McNeese State Recreational Sports Complex in Lake Charles, Louisiana. It is named after Ralph O. Ward, who was head coach of the men's basketball team from 1952 to 1971. The arena is currently home of the men's and women's indoor track and field teams. The Department of Health & Human Performance and administration offices are also located in the building along with athletic facilities for students.

== Arena history ==
The building opened in 1939 as an open-air arena for rodeos and livestock shows. A roof was later added and became the home venue for the McNeese State Cowboys basketball team from 1956 to 1971. The facility also held tennis matches and physical education classes.

The Intramural Recreation Complex opened in 1982. In 1990, the arena was renamed the Ralph O. Ward Memorial Arena in honor of the former McNeese State basketball head coach.

== McNeese State Recreational Sports Complex ==
In 2001, the recreational sports complex was built. An addition was constructed and attached to the arena. The facility became known as the McNeese State Recreational Sports Complex and the arena became a part of the facility.

The complex offers basketball, volleyball, racquetball and indoor track. The complex has an Olympic size indoor and outdoor swimming pool, a 200-meter indoor track, eight outdoor tennis courts, intramural playing fields, wellness center, and locker rooms.
