= Michael Cutright =

American basketball player

Personal information
- Born: May 10, 1967 (age 59) Zwolle, Louisiana, U.S.
- Listed height: 6 ft 4 in (1.93 m)
- Listed weight: 220 lb (100 kg)

Career information
- High school: Zwolle (Zwolle, Louisiana)
- College: McNeese State (1985–1989)
- NBA draft: 1989: 2nd round, 42nd overall pick
- Drafted by: Denver Nuggets
- Position: Guard

Career history
- 1990–1991: La Crosse Catbirds
- 1990–1991: Pensacola Tornados
- 1991–1992: Birmingham Bandits
- 1992–1993: Rochester Renegade
- Stats at Basketball Reference

Michael Cutright (born May 10, 1967) is an American former basketball player. A 6'4 guard, He was named to Southland Conference 1980's All-Decade Men's Basketball Team, which also includes Joe Dumars and Karl Malone. He was drafted in the second round of the 1989 NBA draft by the Denver Nuggets.
