= Bill Reigel =

American basketball player and coach

Biographical details
- Born: May 3, 1932; Monaca, Pennsylvania, U.S.
- Died: October 17, 1993 (aged 61)

Playing career
- 1952–1953: Duke
- 1954–1956: McNeese State
- Position: Guard

Coaching career (HC unless noted)
- 1971–1974: McNeese State

Head coaching record
- Overall: 55–20 (.733)

Accomplishments and honors

Awards
- NAIA tournament MVP (1956); No. 33 retired by McNeese State Cowboys

William Ernest Reigel (May 3, 1932 – October 17, 1993) was an American basketball player and coach. He played college basketball at Duke University and McNeese State University, leading McNeese to the 1956 NAIA championship. Reigel went on to choose the Amateur Athletic Union over an offer from the NBA's Minneapolis Lakers. He earned AAU All-American honors four times.

Following his playing days, he coached at the high school level and was head coach for his alma mater, McNeese State, for three seasons, compiling a record of 55–20.

He died on October 17, 1993.
