= Henry Ray =

American basketball player and coach

Personal information
- Born: Alexandria, Louisiana, U.S.
- Listed height: 6 ft 3 in (1.91 m)

Career information
- High school: Peabody (Alexandria, Louisiana); Bolton (Alexandria, Louisiana)
- College: McNeese State (1972–1975)
- NBA draft: 1975: undrafted
- Position: Forward
- Coaching career: 1982–2013

Career history

Coaching
- 1982–1990: Lafayette HS (assistant)
- 1990–1997: Bryan Station HS (assistant)
- 1997–2013: Transylvania (women's assistant)

Career highlights
- Southland Player of the Year (1975); 2× First-team All-Southland (1974, 1975); Second-team All-Southland (1973)

Henry Ray is an American former professional basketball player and coach. He played college basketball for the McNeese State Cowboys from 1972 to 1975 and is considered one of the program's best players.

Ray is a native of Alexandria, Louisiana. He began his basketball career at Peabody High School, an all-black school. Ray was forced to transfer after his sophomore season to Bolton High School when it was racially integrated and new zoning rules were implemented.

Ray was a standout on the Cowboys team that won the Southland Conference championship during the 1974–75 season. Ray was selected as the Southland Conference Men's Basketball Player of the Year in 1975. His 1,902 points and 883 rebounds both rank fifth in program history.

Ray played several seasons of professional basketball. He served as an assistant coach at Lafayette High School from 1982 to 1990, and Bryan Station High School from 1990 to 1997. Ray was an assistant coach for the Transylvania Pioneers women's basketball team for sixteen seasons.

Ray was inducted into the McNeese Sports Hall of Fame in 1990. He was named to the Southland Conference 1970s All-Decade Men's Basketball Team in 2013.
