= John Rudd (basketball) =

American basketball player (born 1955)

Personal information
- Born: August 7, 1955 (age 71) DeRidder, Louisiana, U.S.
- Listed height: 6 ft 7 in (2.01 m)
- Listed weight: 230 lb (104 kg)

Career information
- High school: DeRidder (DeRidder, Louisiana)
- College: McNeese State (1974–1978)
- NBA draft: 1978: 2nd round, 32nd overall pick
- Drafted by: New York Knicks
- Position: Small forward
- Number: 52

Career history
- 1978–1979: New York Knicks

Career highlights
- 2× First-team All-Southland (1977, 1978)
- Stats at NBA.com
- Stats at Basketball Reference

John William Rudd (born August 7, 1955) is an American former professional basketball player for the New York Knicks. He played forward. He was listed at 6'7" and 230 pounds. He was born on August 7, 1955, in DeRidder, Louisiana. He attended McNeese State University. His first game was on October 31, 1978.

Rudd is best known for his college career at McNeese State, where he was named to the Southland Conference all-1970s team and in 2016 his number 52 jersey was honored by the school and hangs in the Cowboys’ gym rafters.

== Career statistics ==
Legend
GP	Games played	GS	Games started	MPG	Minutes per game
FG%	Field goal percentage	3P%	3-point field goal percentage	FT%	Free throw percentage
RPG	Rebounds per game	APG	Assists per game	SPG	Steals per game
BPG	Blocks per game	PPG	Points per game	**Bold**	Career high

=== NBA ===
==== Regular season ====
Year	Team	GP	MPG	FG%	FT%	RPG	APG	SPG	BPG	PPG
1978–79	New York	58	12.5	.444	.710	2.9	.6	.3	.1	3.2
