= Jim Griffin (American football) =

American football player (born 1942)

No. 85, 71, 77, 76, 87
- Position: Defensive end

Personal information
- Born: February 8, 1942; Lake Charles, Louisiana, U.S.
- Died: February 22, 1995 (aged 53); Lake Charles, Louisiana, U.S.
- Listed height: 6 ft 3 in (1.91 m)
- Listed weight: 265 lb (120 kg)

Career information
- High school: W. O. Boston (Lake Charles)
- College: Grambling State (1960-1963)
- NFL draft: 1964: 15th round, 197th overall pick

Career history
- San Francisco 49ers (1964)*; Joliet Explorers (1964); Toronto Argonauts (1965); San Diego Chargers (1966-1967); Cincinnati Bengals (1968); Indianapolis Capitols (1969)
- * Offseason or practice squad member only

Career AFL statistics
- Fumble recoveries: 2
- Total touchdowns: 1
- Sacks: 5.5
- Stats at Pro Football Reference

James Bauman Griffin (February 8, 1942 – February 22, 1995) was an American professional football player who was a defensive end for three seasons in the American Football League (AFL). He also played one year in the Canadian Football League (CFL) and spent two seasons in minor leagues. He played college football for the Grambling State Tigers

== Professional career ==
A graduate of Grambling State, Griffin was chosen by the San Francisco 49ers in the 15th round of the 1964 NFL draft, but released in September of that year as the 49ers reduced their squad size to meet the league limit. He spent the 1964 season with the Joliet Explorers of the United Football League, and 1965 with the Toronto Argonauts of the CFL, appearing in three games for the latter.

Griffin joined the AFL's San Diego Chargers in 1966, impressing head coach Sid Gillman enough with his pass rushing ability to be named in the starting line-up for their Week 2 game with the Boston Patriots. He appeared in every game throughout his two years in San Diego, starting 13 out of 28 games and being credited with three sacks. (Note: The NFL did not keep sack statistics officially until 1982. Members of the Professional Football Researchers Association have largely reconstructed sack data from 1960 onwards based on official gamebooks, but the NFL does not acknowledge pre-1982 sack numbers.) In 1968, the newly-formed Cincinnati Bengals selected Griffin after the Chargers made him available in the expansion draft. Griffin appeared in every game for the Bengals and started all but one. In the season finale against the Jets, he scored his lone AFL touchdown, knocking the ball out of New York Jets running back Matt Snell's hands and recovering it himself in the end zone.

Griffin didn't play in the AFL again, as he was released by the Bengals shortly before the start of the 1969 season. He spent a single season with the Indianapolis Capitols of the Continental Football League, winning the league title, then retired.

== Personal life ==
Griffin died on February 22, 1995, in Lake Charles, Louisiana.
