= Pointer Williams =

American basketball player

Personal information
- Born: 1974 (age 51–52)
- Listed height: 6 ft 0 in (1.83 m)

Career information
- High school: St. Augustine (New Orleans, Louisiana)
- College: Tulane (1991–1994); McNeese State (1995–1996)
- NBA draft: 1996: undrafted
- Position: Point guard

Career history

Playing
- 1996–1997: Quad City Thunder
- 1997: Fargo-Moorhead Beez
- 1997–1999: (Polish club)
- 1999–2000: LSU-Atletas

Coaching
- 2006–20??: Dillard (assistant)
- 2011–201?: Texas Southern (assistant)

Career highlights
- NCAA steals leader (1996); First-team All-Southland (1996); Southland Newcomer of the Year (1996); Metro Freshman of the Year (1992); Metro All-Freshman Team (1992)

Pointer Williams (born 1974) is an American former basketball player. Williams played for McNeese State University. In 1996, he led the NCAA in steals with 116. He later played professionally in Poland and Lithuania.

In 2006, Williams became an assistant coach at Dillard University. In 2011, he became the director of basketball operations at Texas Southern University.

== See also ==
- List of NCAA Division I men's basketball season steals leaders
