= 1956 NAIA basketball tournament =

College basketball tournament

1956 NAIA men's basketball tournament
- Season: 1955–56
- Teams: 32
- Finals site: Municipal Auditorium; Kansas City, Missouri
- Champions: McNeese State (1st title, 1st title game, 1st Final Four)
- Runner-up: Texas Southern (1st title game, 1st Final Four)
- Semifinalists: Pittsburg State (2nd Final Four); Wheaton (IL) (1st Final Four)
- Coach of the year: John Lance (Pittsburg State)
- MVP: Bill Reigel (McNeese State)

The 1956 NAIA basketball tournament was held in March at Municipal Auditorium in Kansas City, Missouri. The 19th annual NAIA basketball tournament featured 32 teams playing in a single-elimination format. 1956 would be the last tournament with unseeded teams.

The championship game featured McNeese State University and Texas Southern University. It was the first and only appearance for the McNeese State made in the NAIA tournament. The Cowboys beat the Tigers, 60–55.

The third-place game featured Pittsburg State who defeated the Wheaton Thunder, 77–70. This tournament featured six all-time leading scorers.

== Awards and honors ==
Many of the records set by the 1956 tournament have been broken, and many of the awards were established much later:

- Leading scorer est. 1963
- Leading rebounder est. 1963
- Charles Stevenson Hustle Award est. 1958
- Player of the Year est. 1994
- Top single-game performances: Jim Spivey of Southeastern Oklahoma vs State Georgia Southern. Spivey scored 17 field goals 9 free throws, totaling 43 points.
- Most free throws made; career: 120 free throws made by Jim Spivey of Southeastern Oklahoma State (1954,55,56,57).
- All-time leading scorers; first appearance: Dick Barnett, 3rd, Tennessee State (1956,57,58,59) 18 games, 186 field goals, 79 free throws, 451 total points 25.1 average per game, Charles Curtis, 8th, Pacific Lutheran (Wash.) (1956,57,58,59) 14 games 101 field goals, 85 free throws, 287 total points, 20.5 average per game, Roger Iverson, 20th, Pacific Lutheran (1956,57,58,59) 14 games, 109 field goals, 23 free throws, 241 total points, 17.2 average per game, and John Barnhill, 21st, Tennessee State (1956,57,58,59) 17 games, 104 field goals, 27 free throws, 235 total points, 13.8 average per game.
- All-time leading scorer; second appearance: Bennie Swain, 6th Texas Southern (1955,56,57,58) 15 games, 119 field goals, 64 free throws, 302 total points, 20.1 average per game.
- All-time leading scorer; third appearance: James Spivey, 4th, Southeastern Oklahoma (1954,55,56,57) 13 games, 133 field goals, 120 free throws, 386 total points, 29.7 average per game.

== Bracket ==
First round	Second round
Western Illinois State	114
Eastern New Mexico	87
Western Illinois State	72
Pacific Lutheran	67
Pacific Lutheran	79
South Dakota State	64
TOP TIER
Georgia Teachers	81
Southeastern State (OK)	78
Georgia Teachers	72
Pittsburg State	99
Pittsburg State	77
Elon	55
Eau Claire State	84
Portland State	76
Eau Claire State	61
Tennessee A&I State	62
Tennessee A&I State	86
Indiana Central	63
TOP TIER
Central State (OH)	67
Montana State	66
Central State (OH)	74
McNeese State	87
McNeese State	88
Georgetown (KY)	65
Wheaton (IL)	80
Kalamazoo (MI)	60
Wheaton (IL)	74
Stephen F. Austin	66
Stephen F. Austin	72
Coe	64
BOTTOM TIER
Gustavus Adolphus	80
East Tennessee State	60
Gustavus Adolphus	69
San Diego State	60
San Diego State	77
Alderson-Broaddus	64
Texas Southern	108
Hastings	81
Texas Southern	64
Rockhurst	61
Rockhurst	81
Rider	59
BOTTOM TIER
Midwestern (TX)	87
American International	70
Midwestern (TX)	93
Geneva	75
Geneva	74
Arkansas Tech	69

Elite Eight
Western Illinois State	76
Pittsburg State	83
Tennessee A&I State	68
McNeese State	76
Wheaton (IL)	90
Gustavus Adolphus	73
Texas Southern	85
Midwestern (TX)	82

NAIA national semifinals
Pittsburg State	72
McNeese State	78
Wheaton (IL)	73
Texas Southern	82

NAIA national championship
McNeese State	60
Texas Southern	55
NAIA third-place game
Pittsburg State	77
Wheaton (IL)	70

== See also ==
- 1956 NCAA basketball tournament
- 1956 National Invitation Tournament
