= Sha'markus Kennedy =

American basketball player

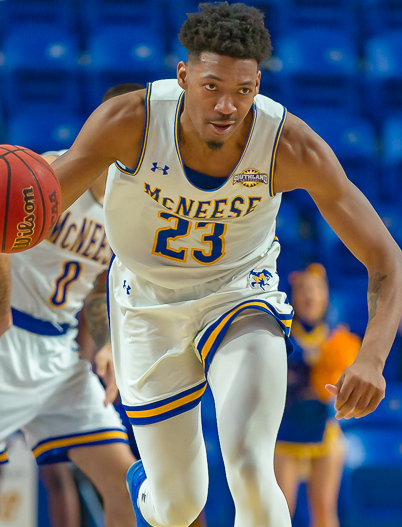
- Kennedy with McNeese State in February 2020

No. 3 – Delta Gurjaani
- Position: Power forward
- League: Georgian Superliga

Personal information
- Born: June 27, 1998 (age 28) Tuscaloosa, Alabama
- Listed height: 2.03 m (6 ft 8 in)
- Listed weight: 100 kg (220 lb)

Career information
- High school: Northridge (Tuscaloosa, Alabama)
- College: Chipola (2016–2018); McNeese State (2018–2020)
- NBA draft: 2020: undrafted
- Playing career: 2020–present

Career history
- 2020–2021: Cantù
- 2021: Rasta Vechta
- 2021–2022: Bnei Herzliya
- 2022–2023: SCM U Craiova
- 2023–2024: Trotamundos de Carabobo
- 2024–2025: KB Bora
- 2025–present: Delta Gurjaani

Career highlights
- First-team All-Southland (2020); Southland Defensive Player of the Year (2020); Southland All-Defensive Team (2020); First-team All-Panhandle (2018)

Sha'markus Kennedy (born June 27, 1998) is an American professional basketball player for Delta Gurjaani in the Georgian Superliga. During the 2024/2025 season he played for Bora in the Kosovo Superleague. Earlier, Kennedy played college basketball for the McNeese State Cowboys.

== High school career ==
Kennedy played basketball for Northridge High School in Tuscaloosa, Alabama. As a senior, he averaged 16 points and eight rebounds per game. He led his team to a 23–10 record and was selected to the Alabama All-Stars team. In high school, Kennedy also took part in track and field.

== College career ==
In his first two years of college basketball, Kennedy played for Chipola College. In his sophomore season, he led his team in scoring (15.1 points per game), rebounds (7.1 per game) and blocks (50) during the regular season. He was named to the Panhandle All-Conference First Team and led Chipola to the FCSAA/NJCAA Region VIII men's basketball tournament. For his final two years, Kennedy moved to McNeese State. On December 30, 2018, he scored a junior season-high 30 points in a win over Campbellsville-Harrodsburg. As a junior, Kennedy averaged 13.1 points and 7.1 rebounds per game and recorded 59 blocks. He led the Southland Conference in field goal percentage at 64.1 percent.

On December 10, 2019, in his senior season, Kennedy posted a triple-double of 17 points, 10 rebounds and 10 blocks in a victory over Kansas City. He scored a career-high 37 points along with 14 rebounds in a January 25, 2020 win over Houston Baptist, breaking the H&HP Complex scoring record. On February 8, Kennedy scored 22 points and grabbed a career-high 21 rebounds in an overtime loss to Central Arkansas. As a senior, he averaged 18.6 points, 10.9 rebounds and 2.6 blocks per game, shooting 67.9 percent from the field, which led the Southland and ranked second in the NCAA Division I. Kennedy registered 17 double-doubles in the season, the third-most in conference history. He was a four-time Southland Player of the Week selection and earned Southland Defensive Player of the Year and First Team All-Southland honors. He was named to McNeese State's All-Decade Team by the American Press.

== Professional career ==
On July 4, 2020, Kennedy signed his first professional contract with Pallacanestro Cantù of the Italian Lega Basket Serie A. However, he left Cantù before the end of the season, on April 1, 2021.

On April 7, 2021, he has signed with Rasta Vechta of the German Basketball Bundesliga.

On July 19, 2021, he has signed with Bnei Herzliya of the Israeli Basketball Premier League. Kennedy averaged 5.5 points and 5.3 rebounds per game in 10 games.

On February 24, 2022, he has signed with SCM U Craiova in the Liga Națională.

On July 12, 2024, he signed for Bora of the Kosovo Superleague.
