= Delta School of Business and Technology =

Private 2-year career college

Coordinates: 30°13′43.5″N 93°12′50.5″W

Delta School of Business and Technology (Delta Tech) is a private for-profit 2-year college in Lake Charles, Louisiana. The school offers certificates and associate degrees in Health Professions, Business, Management, Marketing, and Legal Professions and Studies.

== History ==
Delta Tech was founded in 1970 in Lake Charles, Louisiana. It moved into its present quarters on Broad Street in 1977.

== Accreditation ==
Delta Tech was formerly accredited by the Accrediting Council for Independent Colleges and Schools (ACICS). However, in 2016 the United States Secretary of Education denied ACICS's accrediting status for failing to meet 21 recognition criteria. The college sought another accrediting body, but in March 2018, it "abruptly declared it would stop looking for a new Department of Education-approved accreditor, and thus its students would no longer be eligible for federal grants and loans." The college also cancelled 2018 graduation ceremonies.

The Lake Charles American Press reported that former Delta Tech students had talked about "their experience with suspicious marketing tactics and handling of funds at Delta Tech, and citing concerns over the quality of their education — concerns that mirror those of students at for-profit colleges around the country... It’s important to note that these schools often provide a lifeline to academically marginal students who may not have other options. However, many leave heavily in debt and face poor employment opportunities in a market that places little value on such degrees."
