= Edmund Lawrence (basketball) =

American basketball player

Personal information
- Born: December 8, 1952 Lake Charles, Louisiana, U.S.
- Died: July 16, 2015 (aged 62)
- Listed height: 7 ft 0 in (2.13 m)
- Listed weight: 228 lb (103 kg)

Career information
- High school: W. O. Boston (Lake Charles, Louisiana)
- College: McNeese State (1972–1976)
- NBA draft: 1976: 5th round, 84th overall pick
- Drafted by: Cleveland Cavaliers
- Position: Center
- Number: 50

Career history
- 1980–1981: Anchorage Northern Knights
- 1981: Detroit Pistons

Career highlights
- First-team Parade All-American (1972)
- Stats at NBA.com
- Stats at Basketball Reference

Edmund Lawrence (December 8, 1952 – July 16, 2015) was an American professional basketball player at the center position. He attended McNeese State University where he was selected in the fifth round of the 1976 NBA draft by the Cleveland Cavaliers, but was waived by them before seeing playing time. Lawrence signed with the San Antonio Spurs after being placed on waivers by Cleveland. His tenure in San Antonio ended when he was again waived before the start of the 1980–81 season. He playing time in the NBA lasted three games in the 1980–81 season, which took place during a 10-day contract he signed with the Detroit Pistons.

Lawrence played for the Anchorage Northern Knights of the Continental Basketball Association during the 1980–81 season.

== Career statistics ==
Legend
GP	Games played	GS	Games started	MPG	Minutes per game
FG%	Field goal percentage	3P%	3-point field goal percentage	FT%	Free throw percentage
RPG	Rebounds per game	APG	Assists per game	SPG	Steals per game
BPG	Blocks per game	PPG	Points per game	**Bold**	Career high

=== NBA ===
==== Regular season ====
Year	Team	GP	MPG	FG%	3P%	FT%	RPG	APG	SPG	BPG	PPG
1980–81	Detroit	3	6.3	.625	–	.500	1.3	.3	.3	.0	4.0
