= McNeese Cowboys basketball =

Louisiana basketball team

2026–27 McNeese Cowboys basketball team
- University: McNeese State University
- Head coach: Bill Armstrong (2nd season)
- Location: Lake Charles, Louisiana
- Arena: Townsley Law Arena (capacity: 4,200)
- Conference: Southland
- Nickname: Cowboys
- Colors: Royal blue and gold

NCAA Division I tournament round of 32
- 1968*, 2025

NCAA Division I tournament appearances
- 1968*, 1989, 2002, 2024, 2025, 2026

Conference tournament champions
- 1989, 2002, 2024, 2025, 2026

Conference regular-season champions
- 1975, 1978, 1997, 2001, 2002, 2011, 2024, 2025

Uniforms
Home	Away
- * at Division II level

The McNeese Cowboys basketball team represents McNeese State University in Lake Charles, Louisiana, United States. The school's team currently competes in the Southland Conference.

They are led by head coach Bill Armstrong and play their home games at Townsley Law Arena. Currently members of the NCAA Division I, they were national champions of the NAIA in 1956. Since joining Division I in 1972-73, the Cowboys have appeared five times in the NCAA Tournament, most recently in 2026. McNeese won against Clemson in 2025 for their first NCAA tournament win in program history.

== Postseason appearances ==
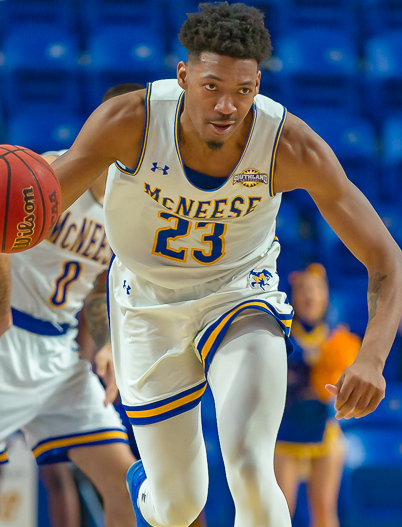
Sha'markus Kennedy in February 2020

=== NCAA Division I Tournament ===
The Cowboys have appeared in five NCAA Division I Tournaments. Their combined record is 1–5.

Year	Seed	Round	Opponent	Result
1989	16	First round	(1) Illinois	L 71–77
2002	14	First round	(3) Mississippi State	L 58–70
2024	12	First round	(5) Gonzaga	L 65–86
2025	12	First round Second round	(5) Clemson (4) Purdue	W 69–67; L 62–76
2026	12	First round	(5) Vanderbilt	L 68–78

=== NCAA Division II Tournament ===
The Cowboys have appeared in one NCAA Division II Tournament. Their record is 0–2.

Year	Round	Opponent	Result
1968	Regional semifinals Regional 3rd-place game	Trinity (TX); Jackson State	L 78–95; L 71–75

=== NAIA Tournament ===
The Cowboys have appeared in one NAIA Tournament. Their record is 5–0. They were national champions in 1956, their only appearance in the tournament.

Year	Round	Opponent	Result
1956	First round Second Round; Quarterfinals; Semifinals; National Championship Game	Georgetown (KY); Central State (OH); Tennessee State; Pittsburg State; Texas Southern	W 88–65; W 87–74; W 76–68; W 78–72; W 60–55

=== NIT ===
The Cowboys have appeared in three National Invitation Tournaments (NIT). Their combined record is 1–3.

Year	Round	Opponent	Result
1986	First round Second Round	Dayton; Louisiana Tech	W 86–75; L 61–77
2001	First round	UTEP	L 74–84
2011	First round	Boston College	L 64–82

=== CIT ===
The Cowboys have appeared in one CollegeInsider.com Postseason Tournament (CIT). Their record is 0–1.

Year	Round	Opponent	Result
2012	First round	Toledo	L 63–76

== Players ==
=== Retired numbers ===
McNeese State Cowboys retired numbers
No.	Player	Years
4	Joe Dumars	1981–1985
25	Stan Kernan	1957–1961
33	Bill Reigel	1954–1956
34	Frank Glenn	1955–1958

=== Cowboys in the NBA ===
Six former Cowboys have appeared in the National Basketball Association.

- Tierre Brown, 2002-2005
- Joe Dumars, 1986-1999
- Trey Gilder, 2010
- Edmund Lawrence, 1981
- Anthony Pullard, 1993
- John Rudd, 1979

== See also ==
- List of NCAA Division I men's basketball programs
