= McNeese State University =

Public university in Lake Charles, Louisiana, US

- Former names: Lake Charles Junior College (1939–1940); John McNeese Junior College (1940–1950); McNeese State College (1950–1970)
- Motto: Excellence With A Personal Touch
- Type: Public university
- Established: September 1939; 87 years ago
- Parent institution: UL System
- Academic affiliations: Space-grant
- President: Mike Reese
- Students: 6,556 (fall 2025)
- Undergraduates: 6,055 (fall 2025)
- Postgraduates: 501 (fall 2025)
- Location: Lake Charles, Louisiana, U.S. 30°10′50″N 93°13′00″W
- Campus: Urban, 121 acres (49 ha)
- Colors: Royal blue, Sunflower gold
- Nickname: Cowboys and Cowgirls
- Sporting affiliations: NCAA Division I FCS – Southland
- Mascot: Rowdy
- Website: www.mcneese.edu

McNeese State University is a public university in Lake Charles, Louisiana, United States. Founded in 1939 as Lake Charles Junior College, it was renamed McNeese Junior College after John McNeese, an early local educator. The present name was adopted in 1970. McNeese is part of the University of Louisiana System and is classified as a Master's University. The university consists of six colleges and the Doré School of Graduate Studies. McNeese is accredited by the Southern Association of Colleges and Schools.

== History ==
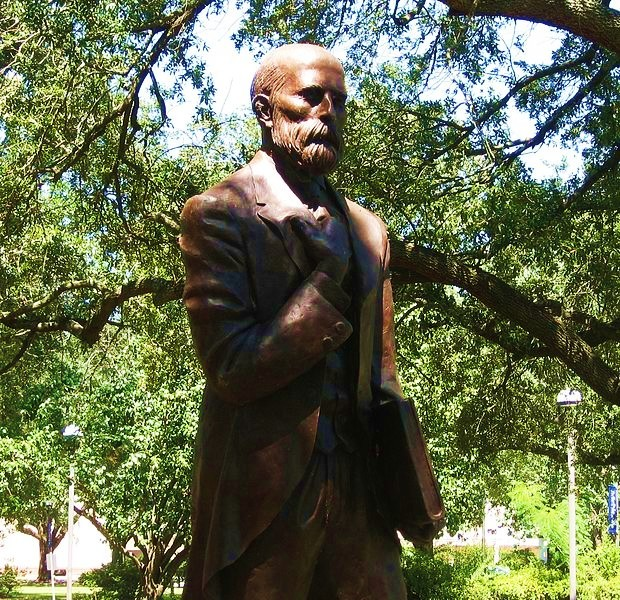
Statue of John McNeese on the campus. McNeese, a regional pioneer educator, is the namesake of the university.

McNeese State University was founded in 1939 as a division of Louisiana State University and was originally called Lake Charles Junior College. It offered only the first two years of higher education. McNeese opened its doors on an 86-acre (35 ha) tract donated by the Calcasieu Parish Police Jury, the parish governing board. There were two original buildings: the former Administration Building (Kaufman Hall) and the McNeese Arena (Ralph O. Ward Memorial Gym). The auditorium, now Francis G. Bulber Auditorium, was completed in 1940 as the third building on the campus. These three buildings are still in use today. The name became John McNeese Junior College in 1940 by resolution of the University Board of Supervisors in honor of Imperial Calcasieu Parish's first superintendent of schools.

In 1950, the college became an autonomous four-year institution as McNeese State College. The bill was advanced by State Senator Gilbert Franklin Hennigan of DeRidder in neighboring Beauregard Parish. It was separated from Louisiana State University and renamed McNeese State College. Its administration was transferred to the Louisiana State Board of Education. In 1960, legislators authorized McNeese to offer curricula leading to the master's degree; in 1966, the degree of Educational Specialist was first offered. In 1970, its name changed to McNeese State University. McNeese was first accredited in 1954 by the Southern Association of Colleges and Schools.

=== Leadership ===
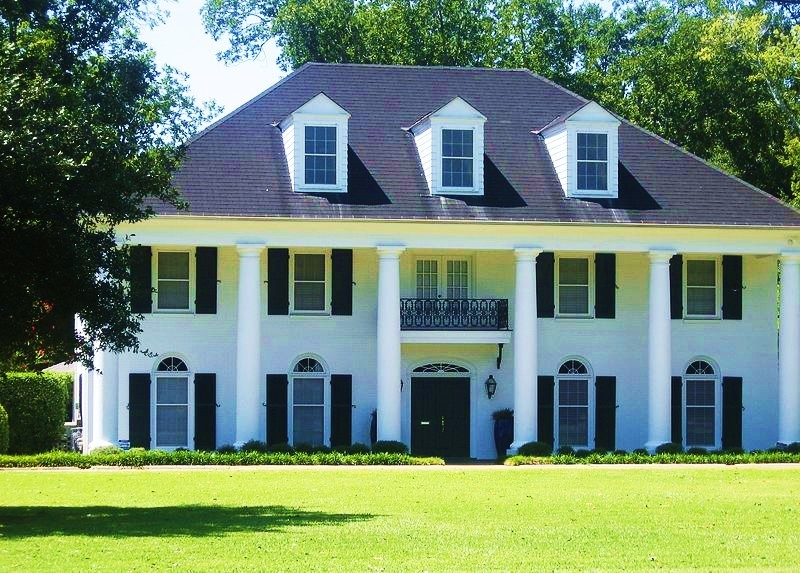
The President's Home

- Joseph T. Farrar (1939–1940)
- William B. Hatcher (1940–1941)
- Rodney Cline (1941–1944)
- Lether Frazar (1944–1955) Retired in 1955, became lieutenant governor of Louisiana thereafter.
- Wayne N. Cusic (1955–1969) Retired in 1969.
- Thomas S. Leary (1969–1980) Resigned from presidency.
- Jack Doland (1980–1987) Resigned in order to run for state office.
- Robert Hébert (1987–2010)
- Philip C. Williams (2010–2017)
- Daryl Burckel (2017–2024)
- Wade Rousse (2024–2025)
- Kedrick Nicholas-Interim (2025–2026)
- Mike Reese (2026– )

== Campus ==
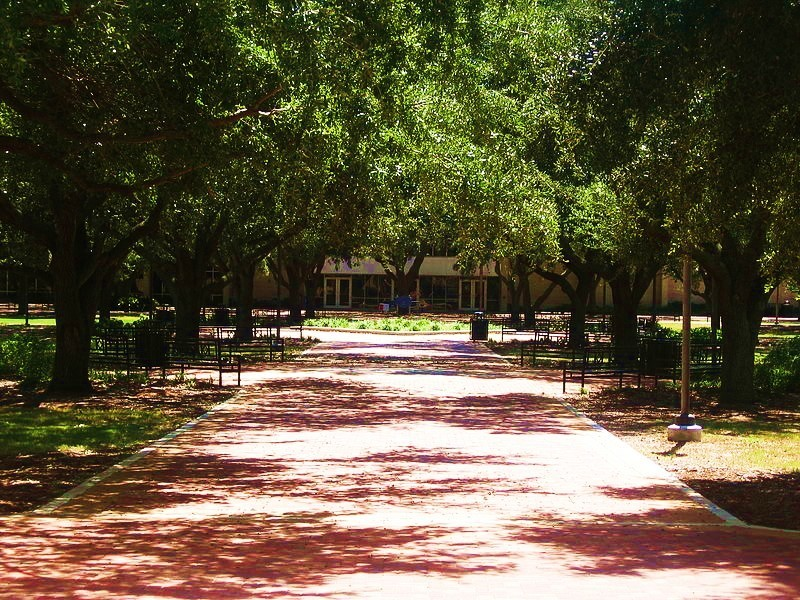
The Quadrangle looking toward the Student Union, also known as The Ranch.

McNeese State University consists of 79 buildings over approximately 1,560 acres. The 121-acre main campus, dotted with live oak trees and azaleas, features approximately 51 buildings including the three original structures – Kaufman Hall, Ralph O. Ward Memorial Gym (the Arena), and Francis G. Bulber Auditorium. Bulber Auditorium, a striking example of Art Deco architecture, is listed on the National Register of Historic Places. Campus features include the 503-acre (204 ha) McNeese Farm, a 65-acre (26 ha) Athletic campus, and nearly 1,600 acres (650 ha) of donated farm property used for research, farming, and ranching.

The newest addition to the campus is the 145,000 square foot Townsley Law Arena, which houses the academic classes, faculty offices, and training facilities for the Department of Health and Human Performance (effective June 1, 2024, the department will be renamed as the H.C. Drew School of Kinesiology), in addition to being home to the men's and women's basketball and volleyball programs. The basketball arena features the Joe Dumars Court, named in honor of McNeese's most accomplished basketball player to date. The basketball arena seats 4,242 and the volleyball court has seating for 500.

Jack V. Doland Field House is named after a former McNeese head football coach, athletic director and university president. The 53,838 square foot facility, which houses the ticket office and features a digital and interactive Hall of Fame room and a club level with an indoor club room and outside seating, also includes team meeting rooms and coaches offices.

The campus features four significant sculptures, including "An Honest Day's Work" by sculptor Fred Fellows located at Entrance Plaza, a commemorative statue of John McNeese by sculptor Janie Stine LaCroix located near Smith Hall, "The Cowboy" created by legendary western painter and sculptor Buck McCain located inside Jack V. Doland Field House and the iconic replica of the famous Frederic Remington sculpture, “The Bronco Buster,” located in front of the Field House.

The McNeese State Recreational Sports Complex includes two weight rooms, basketball courts, tennis courts, an indoor track, and an Olympic-size swimming pool.

== Academics ==
Academic rankings

Master's
- Washington Monthly: 360

Regional
- U.S. News & World Report: 98 (South)

McNeese State University offers 50 degree programs in its five colleges and the graduate school, including 33 undergraduate, 16 graduate, and 1 doctoral degree programs.

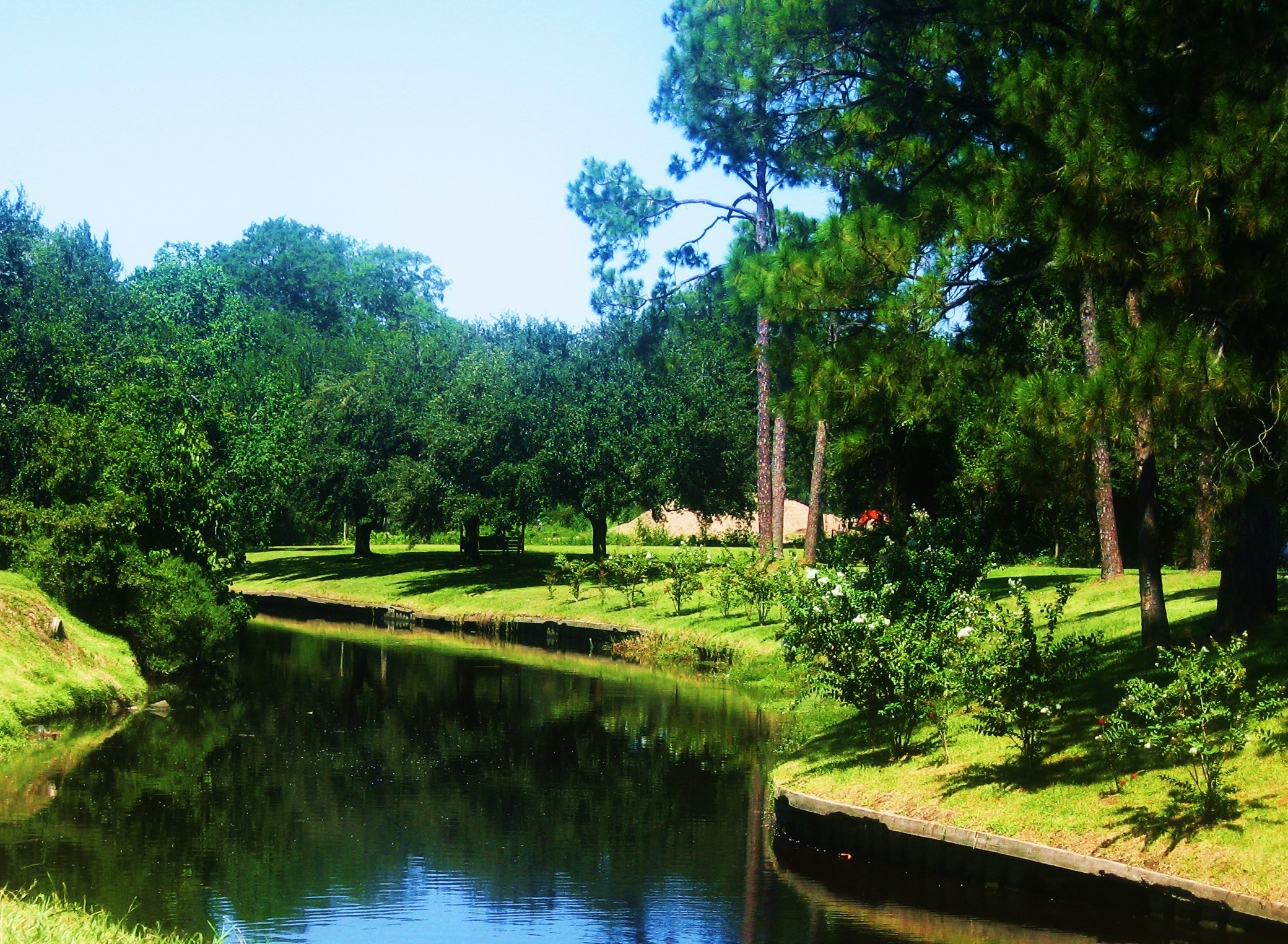
Contraband Bayou runs through the southern portion of the McNeese campus.

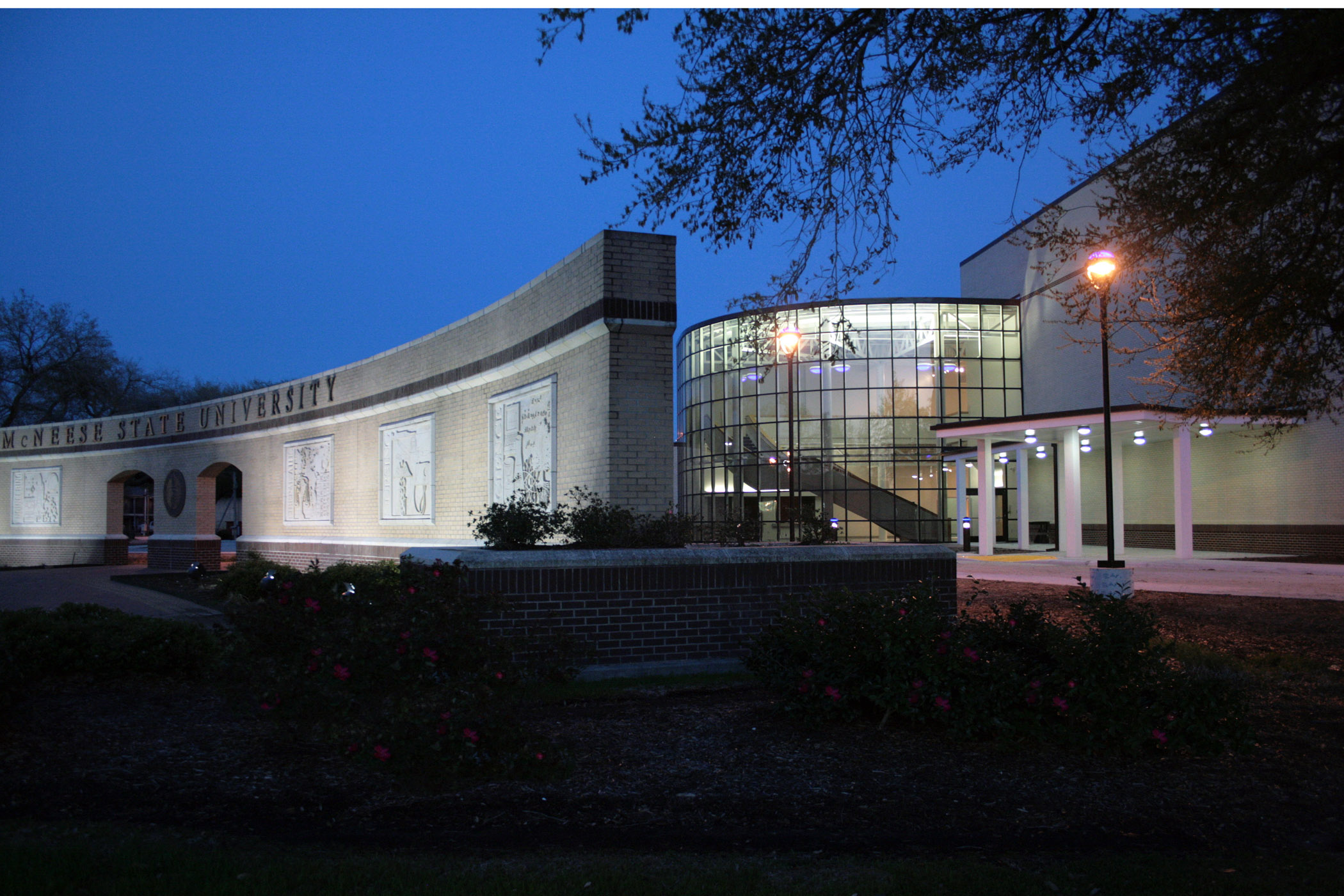
The Shearman Fine Arts Center stands behind the McNeese Entrance Plaza.

- The College of Business
- The Burton College of Education
- The College of Engineering and Sciences
- The College of Liberal Arts
- The College of Nursing and Health Professions
- The Doré School of Graduate Studies

McNeese was the first university in the state of Louisiana to offer a concentration in forensic chemistry and one of the first schools in the nation to offer a concentration in terrorism, preparedness, and security.

The College of Nursing and Health Professions is housed in the Juliet Hardtner Hall, named for a McNeese donor and daughter of the Louisiana timber magnate and conservationist, Henry E. Hardtner of La Salle Parish. In the fall of 2021, the college began offering the first Doctor of Nursing Practice (DNP) degree in advanced practice psychiatric mental health nursing in the state.

The Department of English and Foreign Languages, in conjunction with the local chapter of Sigma Tau Delta, publishes The Arena, which is an annual collection of art, essays, fiction, and poetry by students, regardless of major.

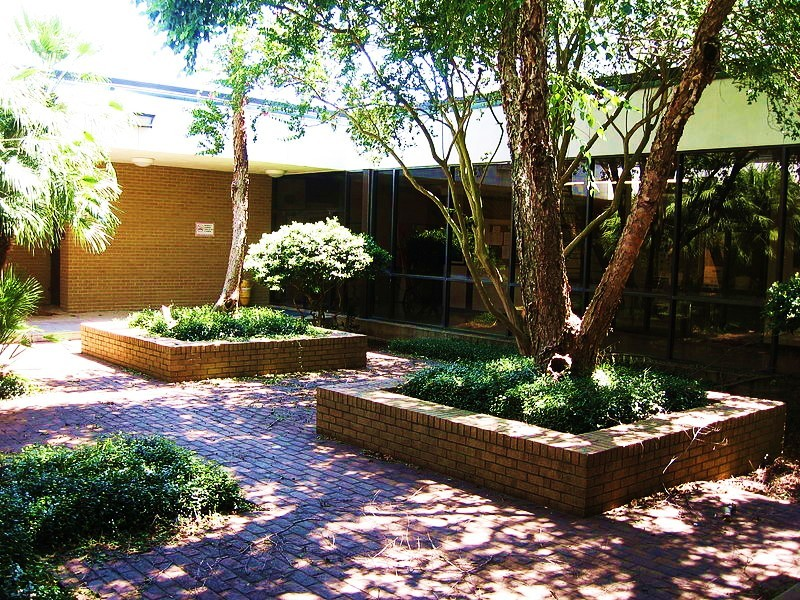
Courtyard near the Engineering Technology Laboratory building

Fifteen members of faculty have received Fulbright Awards. Faculty members in the Departments of Engineering, Performing Arts, Social Sciences and English and Foreign Languages have taught in Rwanda, Romania, Greece, Korea, and Wales, among other countries. In the Department of English and Foreign Languages alone, four faculty members have received Fulbrights.

The College of Business is accredited by the Association to Advance Collegiate Schools of Business.

The Engineering departments housed in the College of Engineering and Sciences offers a multi-discipline curriculum to all students with majors in chemical, civil, electrical, and mechanical engineering. That is, students in these individual disciplines are taught by faculty of other disciplines in certain classes. In addition to the degree of Bachelor of Science in engineering, the departments also offer the Master of Engineering degree in chemical, civil, electrical, and mechanical engineering and engineering management. The college is closely linked to the nearby petrochemical industries and refineries through the Industrial Advisory Board and Lake Area Industry Alliance/McNeese Engineering Partnership. Many students participate in internships with the related industries.

The Institute for Industry-Education Collaboration is a continuing education program that offers a wide range of in-person and online professional development programs. The program is also a training provider for Louisiana's Incumbent Worker Training program and offers facilities and equipment for customized industry training.

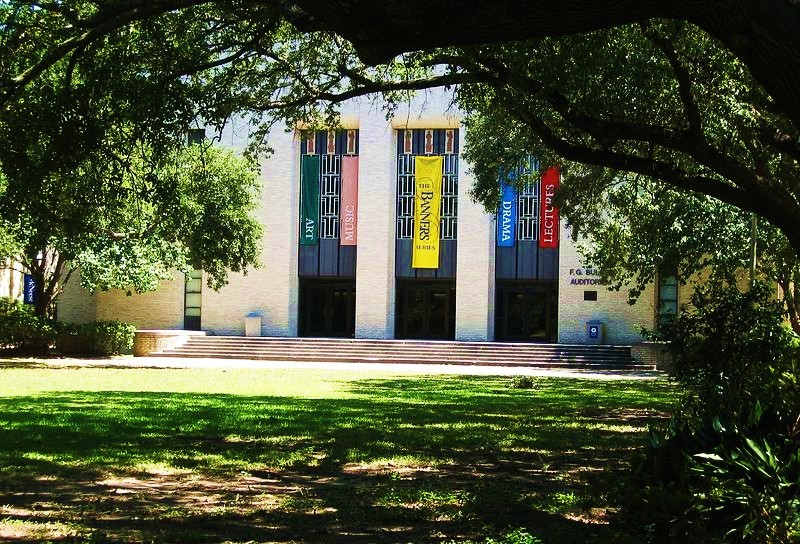
Bulber Auditorium is on the National Register of Historic Places

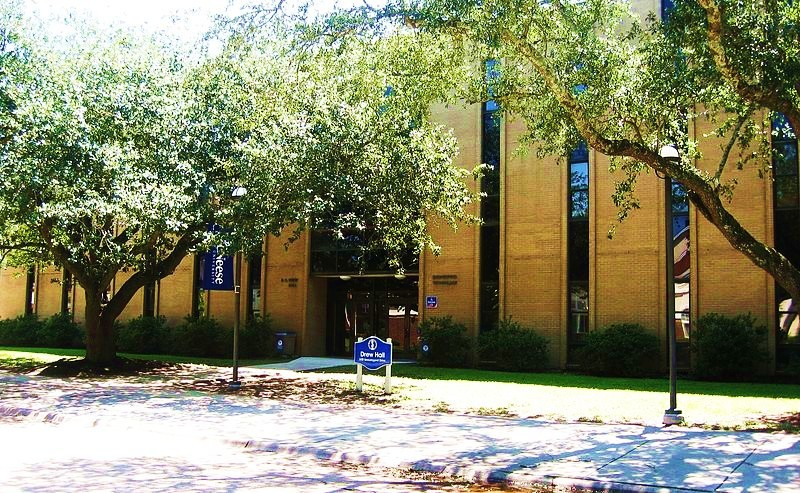
Drew Hall, housing the College of Engineering

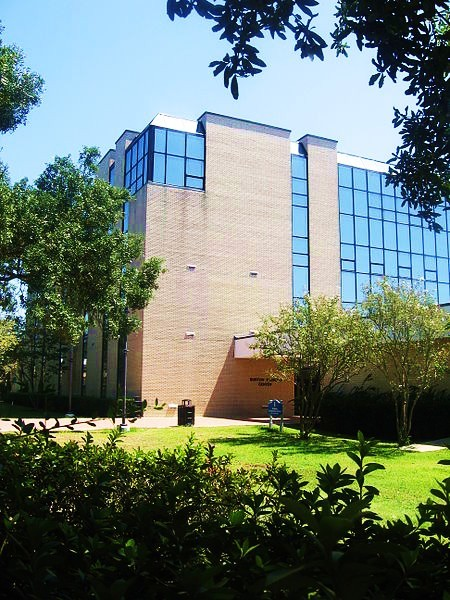
Burton Business Center

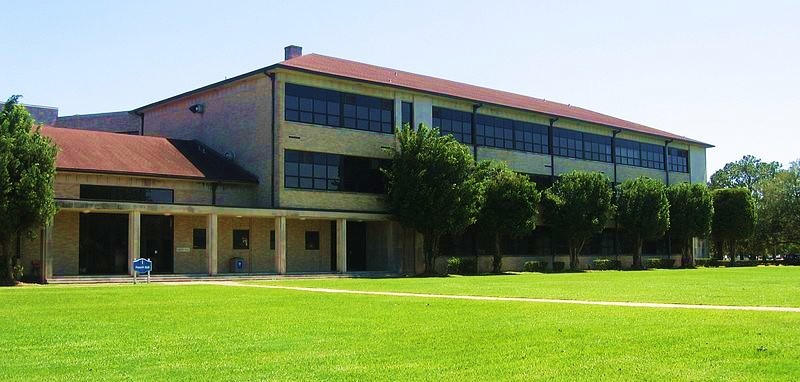
Frasch Hall is home to the Department of Biology and Health Sciences.

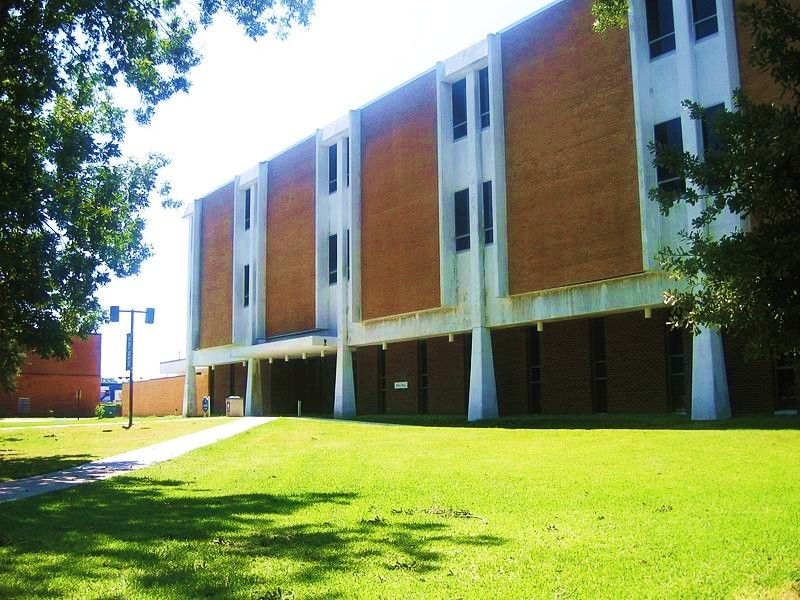
Gayle Hall houses the Harold and Pearl Dripps Department of Agricultural Sciences.

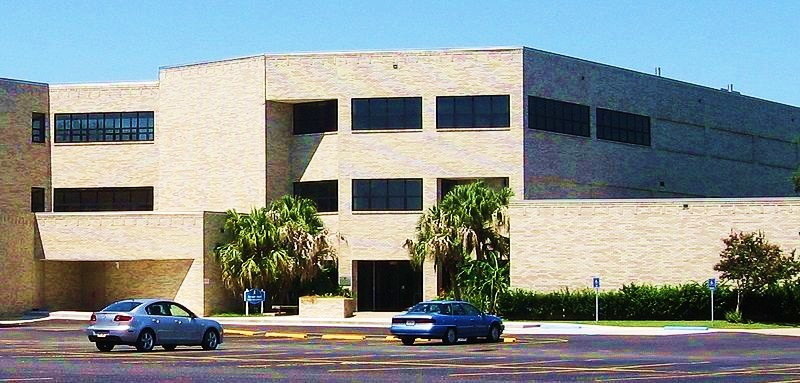
Frasch Hall Annex

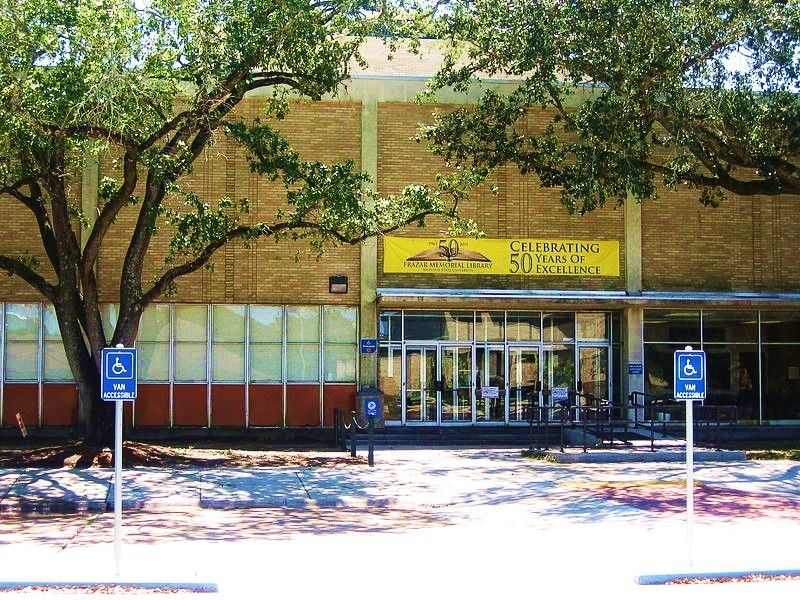
Entrance to Frazar Memorial Library

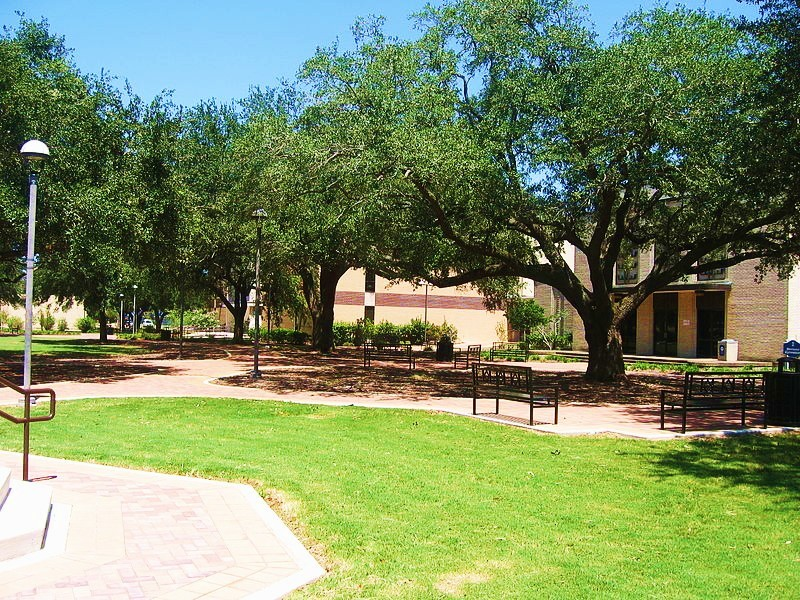
Farrar Hall and Memorial Gymnasium from the quadrangle

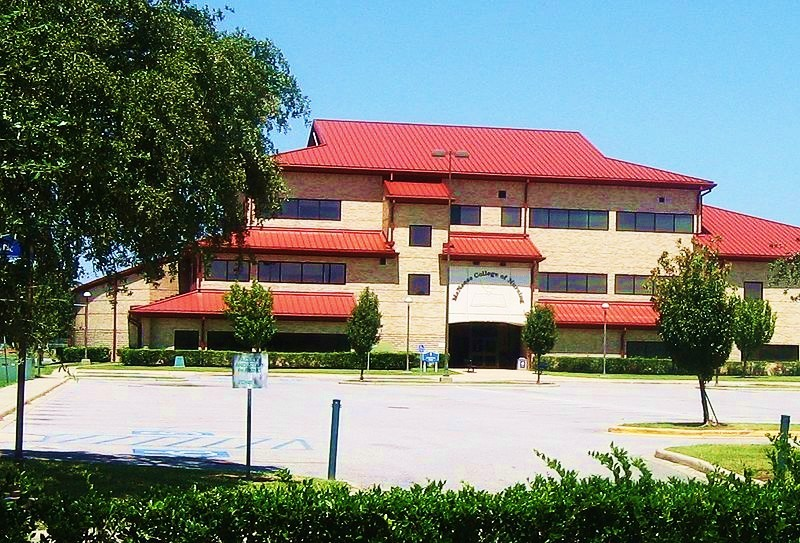
Hardtner Hall

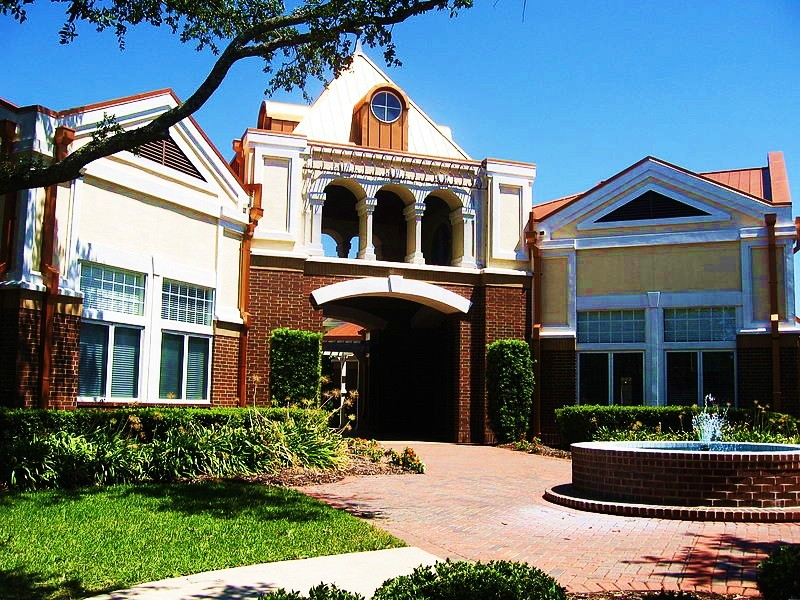
Office of Student Housing

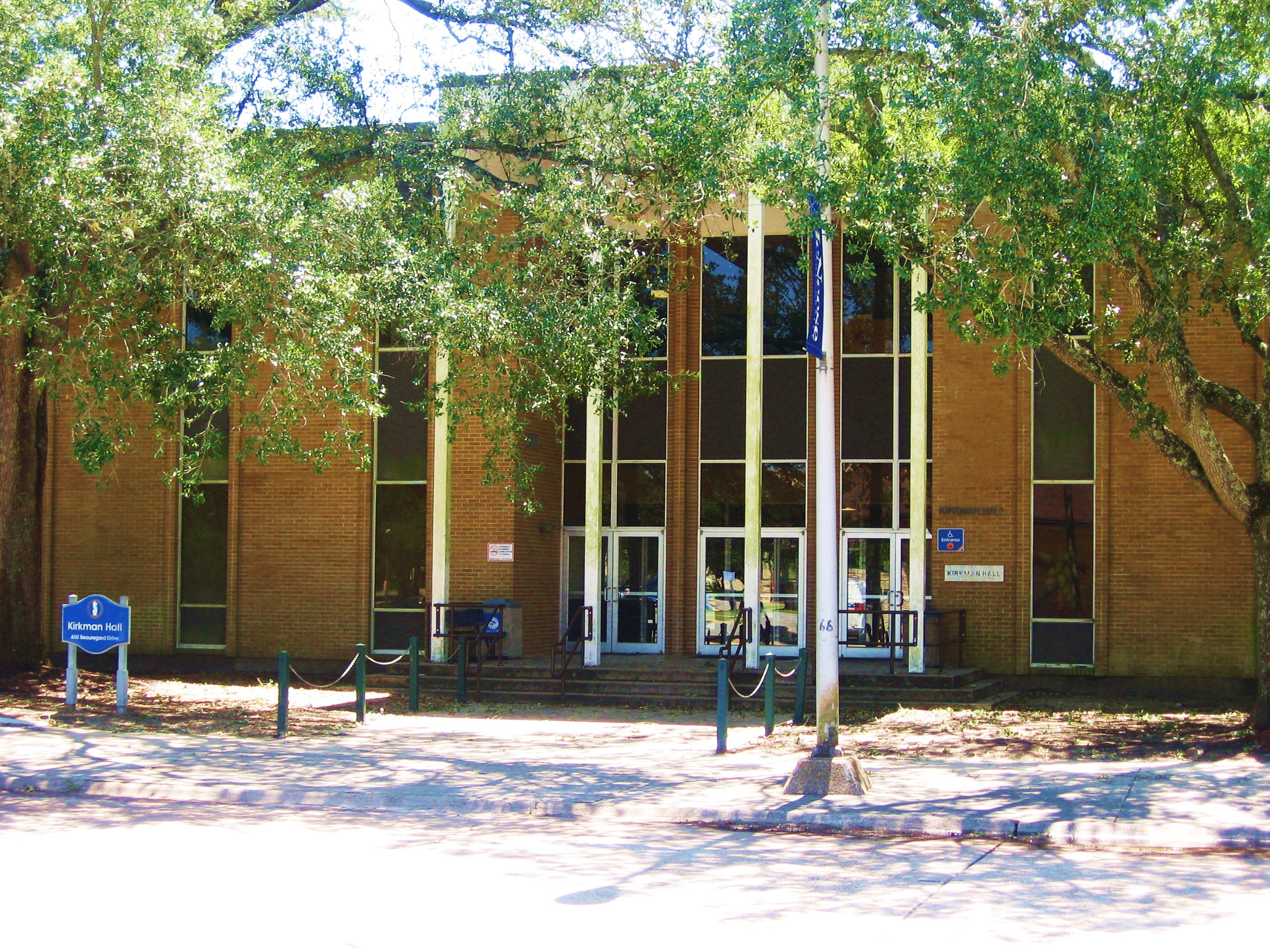
Kirkman Hall

== Athletics ==
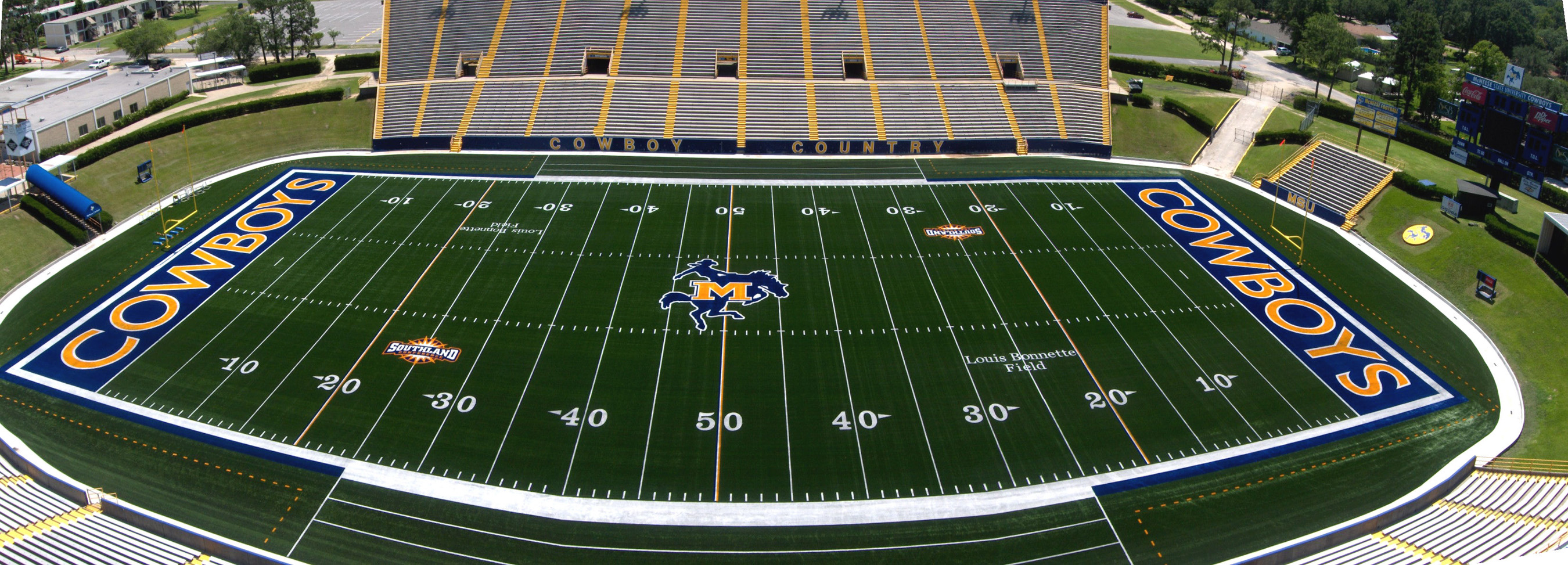
Cowboy Stadium, also known as "The Hole"

McNeese's colors are blue and gold. The men's sports teams are known as the Cowboys, while the women's athletic teams are the Cowgirls. McNeese State sports teams participate in NCAA Division I (Football Championship Subdivision for football) in the Southland Conference.

=== Football ===
The football team plays at Louis Bonnette Field at Cowboy Stadium, which seats 17,000 fans. It is also known as "The Hole" or lately as "the lil' House" and is located near campus. The team played in the inaugural Independence Bowl game in 1976, a 20–16 victory over Tulsa. They went on to make two more appearances in 1979 and 1980. The Cowboys football team has more recently played in two Division I-AA Finals, in 1997 and 2002.

=== Basketball ===
The Cowboys basketball and volleyball teams both moved into the venue now known as The Legacy Center in 2018. This gave the basketball teams their first on-campus facility since leaving the Ralph O. Ward arena. In 1956, the Cowboys won the NAIA Division I Men's Tournament. It was the only appearance the Cowboys made in the NAIA tournament. McNeese State defeated Texas Southern 60 to 55. The men's basketball team has made four appearances in the NCAA men's basketball tournament, most recently in 2025, and the team has qualified for the National Invitation Tournament three times, the most recent invitation being in 2011. The school's most famous basketball alumnus is Joe Dumars, who was a first-round draft pick (18th overall) of the Detroit Pistons in 1985 and went on to have a Hall of Fame career with them.

The women's basketball team earned its invitation to the "Big Dance" in 2011, by sweeping the Southland Conference Tournament. In 2011, both the men's and women's basketball teams claimed Southland Conference titles in their respective divisions, marking the first time in the 25-year history of the Southland Conference that the men's and women's teams from the same university have won regular-season titles in the same year.

=== Baseball ===
The baseball team plays games at Cowboy Diamond. The Cowboys' baseball teams have made several appearances in the NCAA Division I Baseball Championship, most recently in 2000, 2003, and 2019.

=== Soccer ===
The McNeese Cowgirls soccer team plays their games at Cowgirl Field. The soccer program began in 1996, and has since claimed 1 regular season Southland Conference Championship in 2007 and 1 Southland Conference tournament Championships in 13 tournament appearances. In 2015, the Cowgirl Soccer Team named Drew Fitzgerald just the second Head Coach in program history, following Scooter Savoie who had been at the helm since the founding of the program in 1996. Fitzgerald, who had previously served as the team's associate head coach, made an immediate impact in the program, leading the Cowgirls to a 9–10–1 record and taking the sixth place seed in their 13th Southland Conference tournament appearance and their first appearance in the second round of the tournament since the 2008 season. The last and only time the Cowgirl Soccer team was able to capture the Southland Conference tournament title and earn a bid to the NCAA Championship tournament was in 2006, when the team suffered a 2-0 first round loss to Southern Methodist University.

== Student life ==
Undergraduate demographics as of fall 2023
Race and ethnicity	Total
White	64%
Black	18%
International student	6%
Hispanic	5%
Two or more races	4%
Asian	2%
Unknown	1%
Economic diversity
Low-income (Note: The percentage of students who received an income-based federal Pell grant intended for low-income students.)	35%
Affluent (Note: The percentage of students who are a part of the American middle class at the bare minimum.)	65%

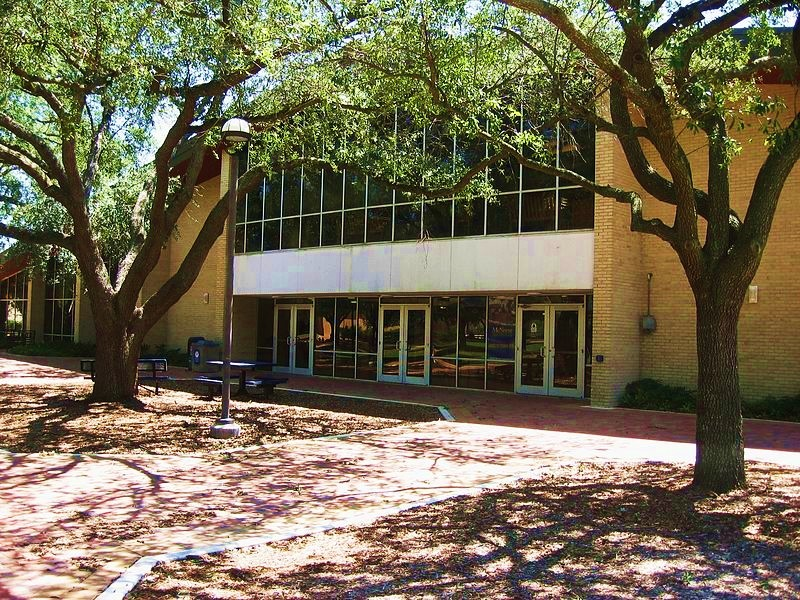
The McNeese Student Union, also known as The Ranch.

The McNeese State University newspaper is The Contraband, a weekly publication which has existed since 1939. The university's student yearbook is The Log. It was first published in 1941.

=== Greek life ===
The Greek community of McNeese State University comprises 14 Greek letter organizations.

== Notable people ==
=== Alumni ===
- Joe W. Aguillard – president of Louisiana Christian University
- Danny Ardoin – professional baseball player
- Zack Bronson – professional football player
- Ben Broussard – professional baseball player
- Tierre Brown – professional basketball player
- James D. Cain Jr. – judge
- Christopher Catrambone – businessman and humanitarian
- Michael Ray Charles – artist
- Clay Condrey – professional baseball player
- Mike Danahay – politician
- Jefferson J. DeBlanc – World War II ace fighter pilot and Medal of Honor recipient
- Joe Dumars – professional basketball player and executive
- Dan Flavin – politician
- Fabulous Flournoy – professional basketball player coach with the Toronto Raptors, former player and head coach for basketball team Newcastle Eagles, who competed in the British Basketball League
- Ray Fontenot – professional baseball player
- Douglas B. Fournet – United States Army officer and posthumous recipient of the Medal of Honor
- Keith Frank – musician
- Dorothy Sue Hill (Home Economics Education, 1960) – state representative for Allen, Beauregard, and Calcasieu parishes since 2008, rancher in Dry Creek
- Bob Howry – professional baseball player
- Adam Johnson – novelist and Pulitzer Prize winner
- Kerry Joseph – professional football player
- Doug Kershaw – musician
- Bobby Kimball – musician
- Luke Lawton – professional football player
- Conway LeBleu – politician
- Demond Mallet – professional basketball player
- Robert MacIntyre - PGA Tour Member
- Keith Ortego – professional football player
- Eric Pete – author
- Kavika Pittman – professional football player
- Rupert Richardson – civil rights activist and civil rights leader
- B. J. Sams – professional football player
- Tom Sestak – professional football player
- Taja V. Simpson – actress
- Leonard Smith – professional football player
- R. C. Slocum – college football coach
- Vic Stelly – politician
- John Thomson – professional baseball player
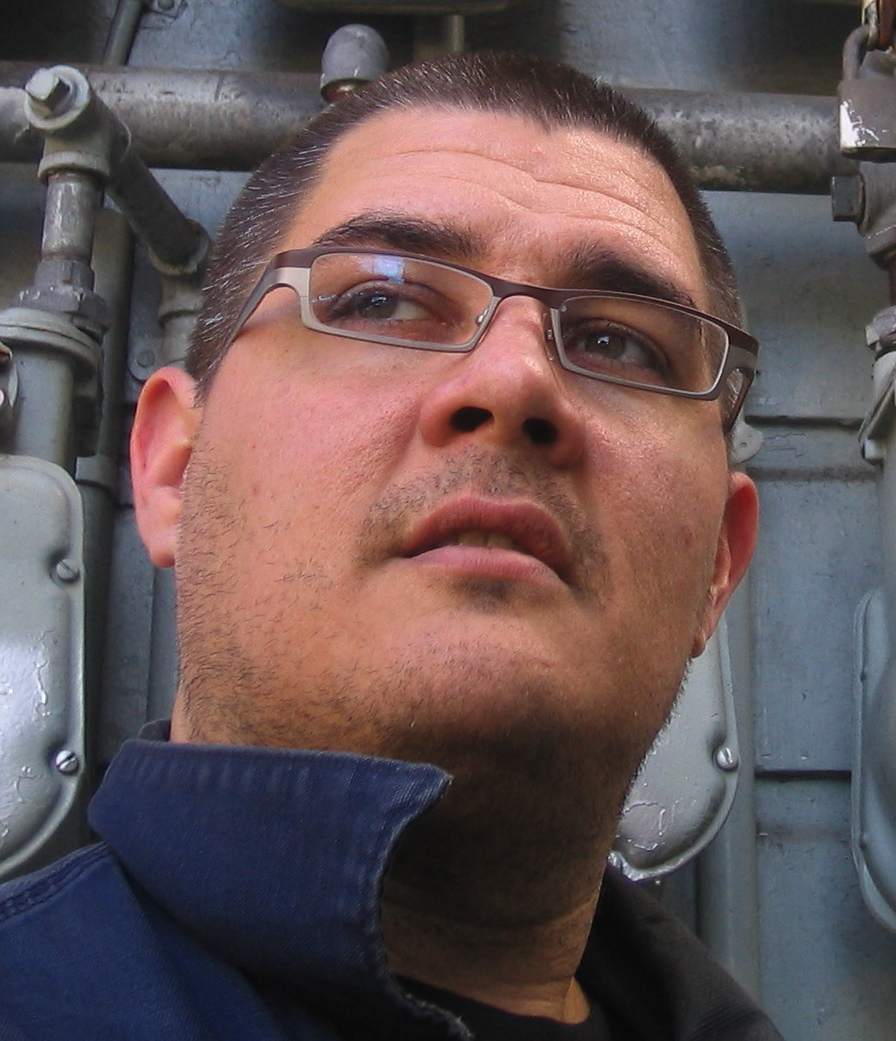
Adam Johnson, novelist and Pulitzer Prize winner

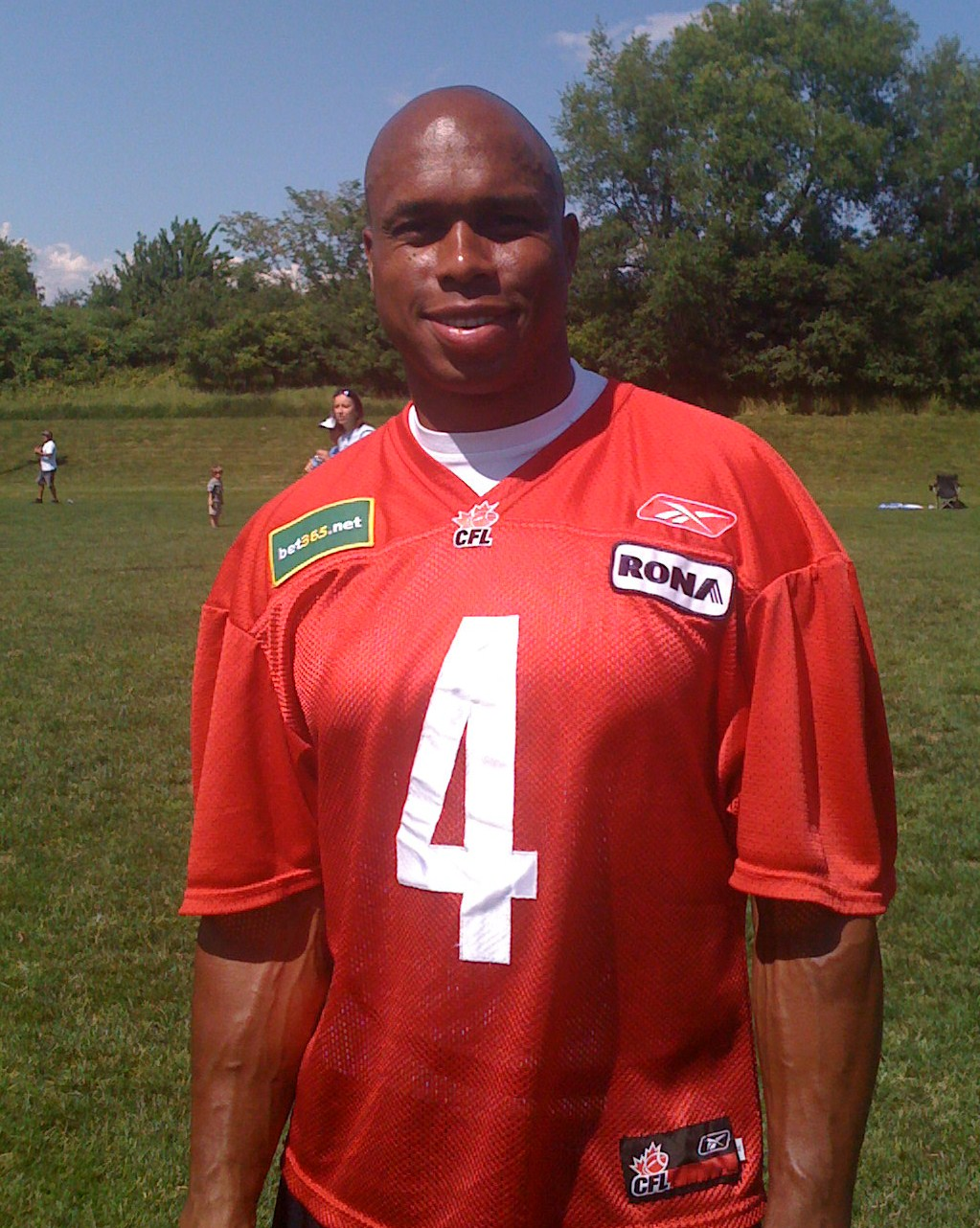
Kerry Joseph, professional football player

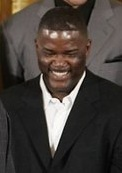
Joe Dumars, professional basketball player

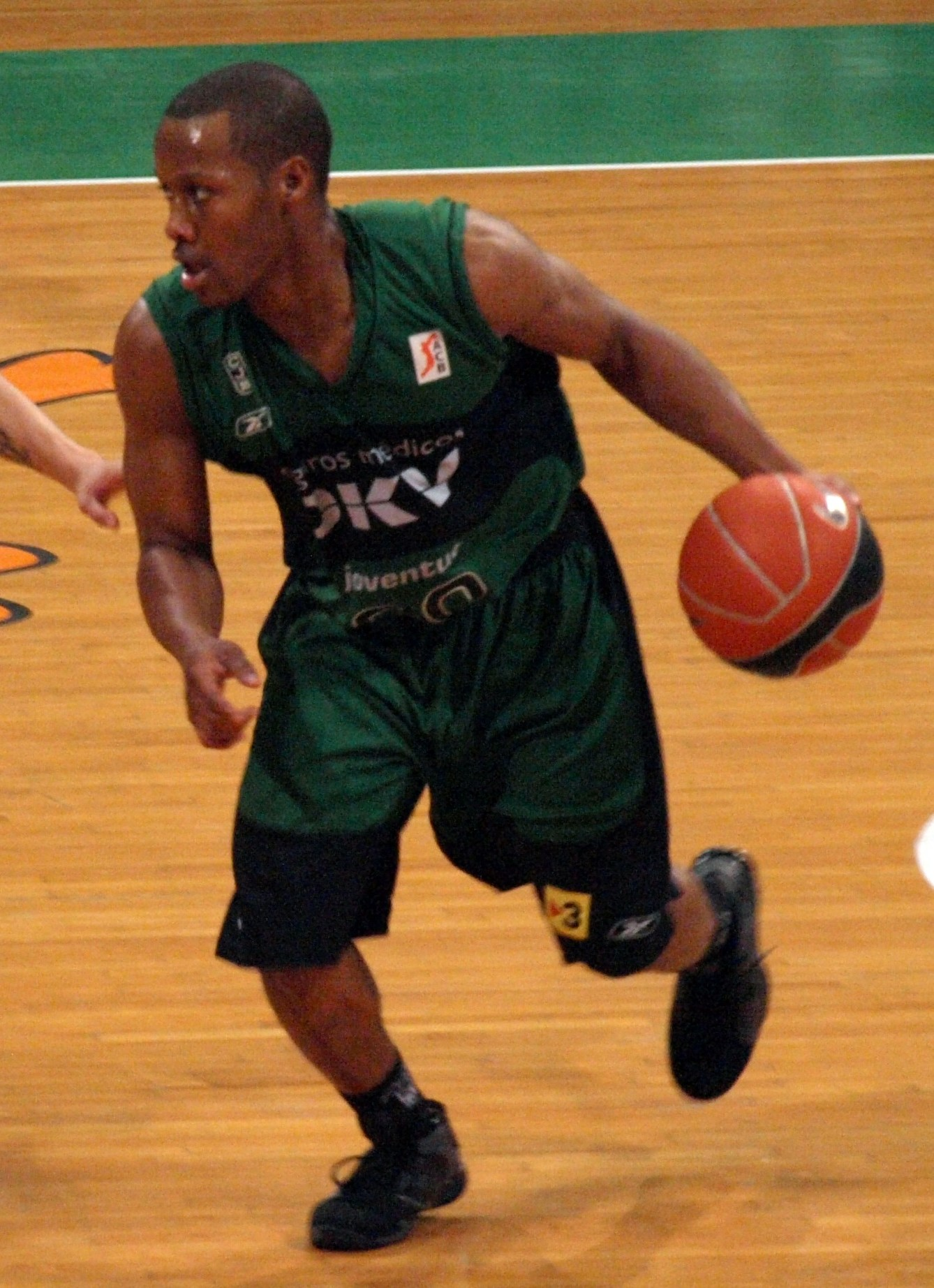
Demond Mallet, professional basketball player

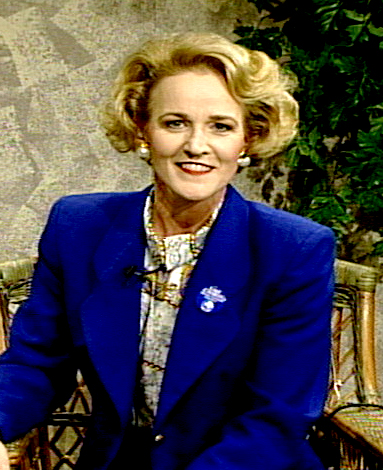
Willie Mount, politician

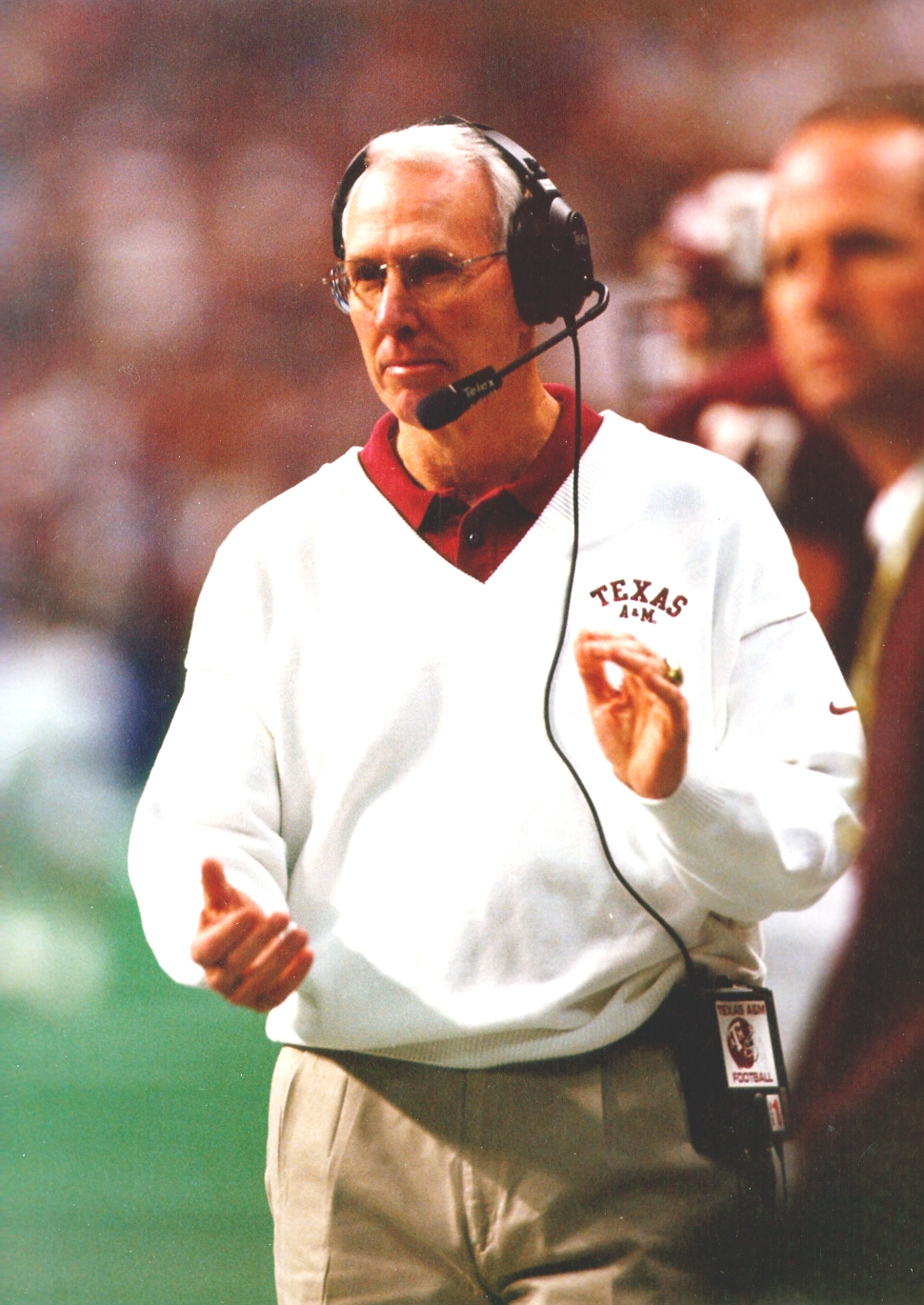
R. C. Slocum, college football coach

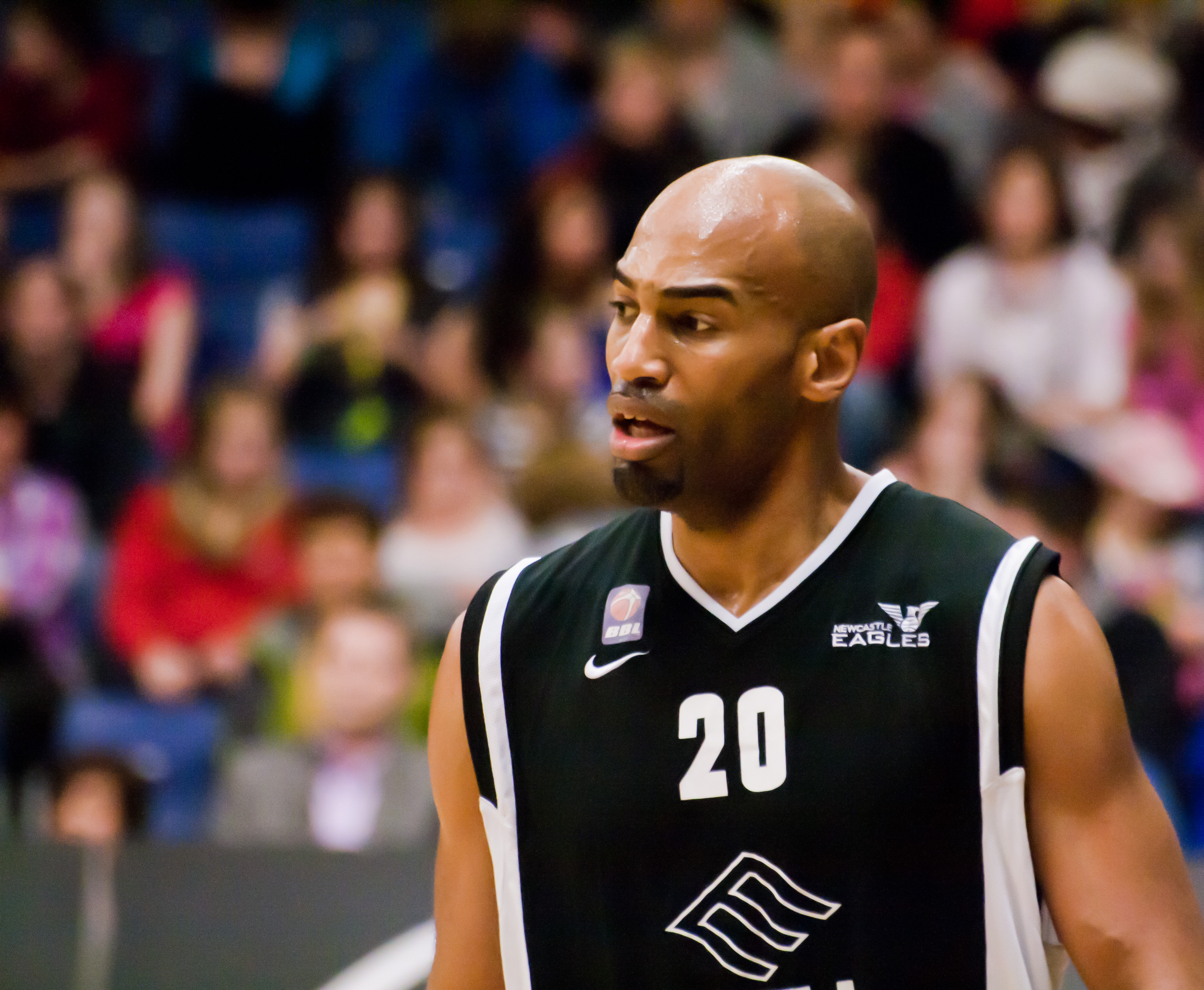
Fabulous Flournoy, professional basketball coach

=== Faculty ===
- Ray Authement – Professor of Mathematics; the fifth president of the University of Louisiana at Lafayette, 1974–2008; the longest serving president of a public university in the United States
- Edith Killgore Kirkpatrick – music professor at McNeese, 1955–1958; later member of Louisiana Board of Regents
- Joe Gray Taylor – professor of history
