= Nicholls Colonels basketball =

Nicholls Colonels basketball may refer to either of the basketball teams that represent Nicholls State University:

- Nicholls Colonels men's basketball
- Nicholls Colonels women's basketball
