= KNSU =

KNSU may refer to:

- KNSU (FM)
- Korea National Sport University
