= Nicholls Soccer Complex =

Soccer field in Louisiana

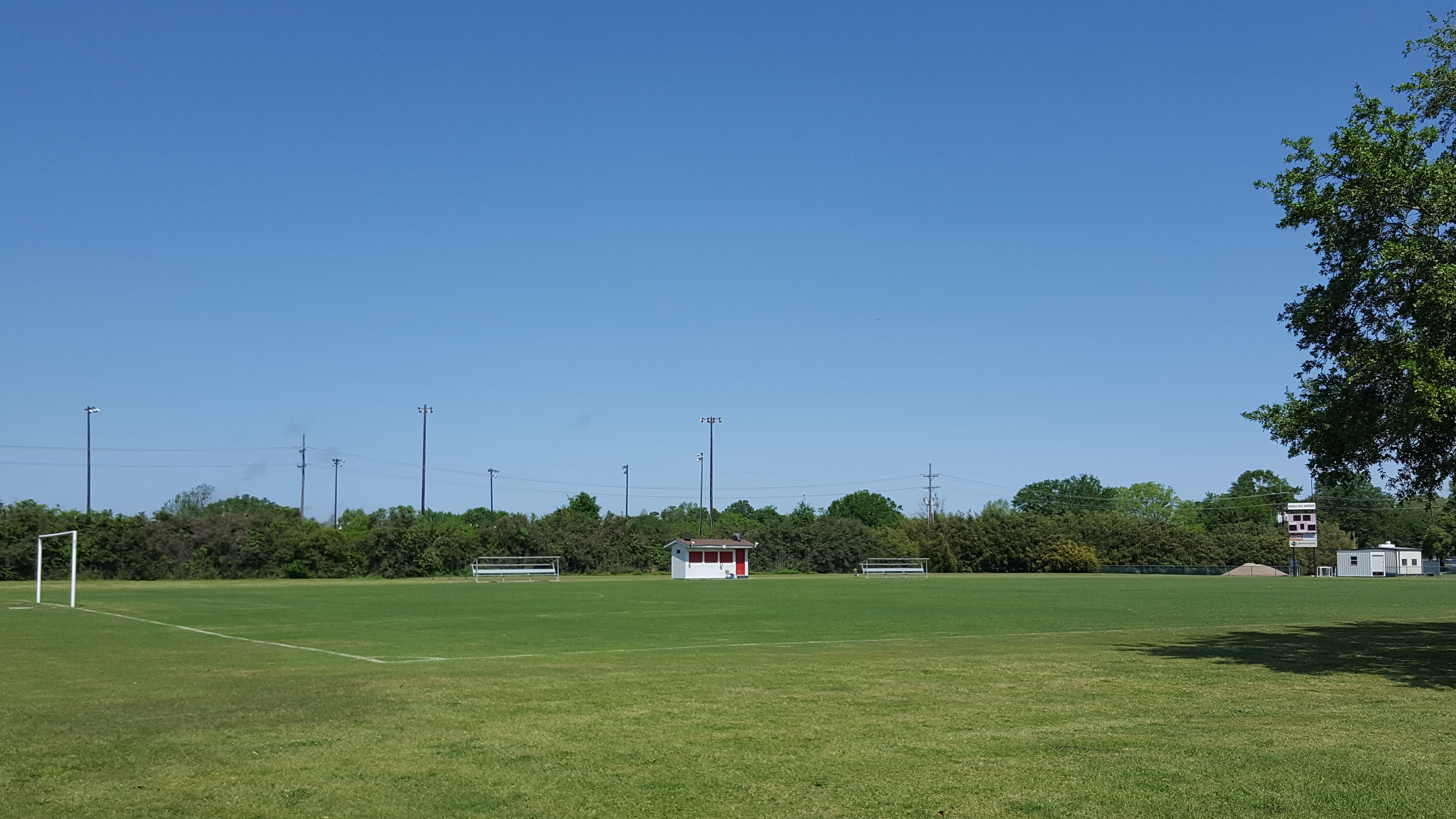
- Interactive map of Nicholls Soccer Complex
- Location: Thibodaux, Louisiana; United States
- Coordinates: 29°47′13.8″N 90°48′24.5″W
- Owner: Nicholls State University
- Operator: Nicholls Athletics Department
- Capacity: 1,000

Construction
- Opened: 1998

Tenant
- Nicholls Colonels women's soccer (NCAA)

The Nicholls Soccer Complex is a soccer facility located on the campus of Nicholls State University in Thibodaux, United States. The stadium has a seating capacity of 1,000. It served as the home of the Nicholls Colonels women's soccer team through the 2021 season. In 2012, the soccer stadium received a complete renovation which including locker rooms, a team area, offices, new press box and a concession area.

Beginning with the 2022 season, the Colonels moved to the Thibodaux Regional Sports Complex.

== High attendance ==
Below is the Colonels' yearly high home attendance from 2014 to 2021.

Yearly Home Attendance
Season	Average	High
Nicholls
2021	120	237
2020	96	167
2019	48	211
2018	108	231
2017	224	339
2016	209	382
2015	481	781
2014	326	387

== Gallery ==
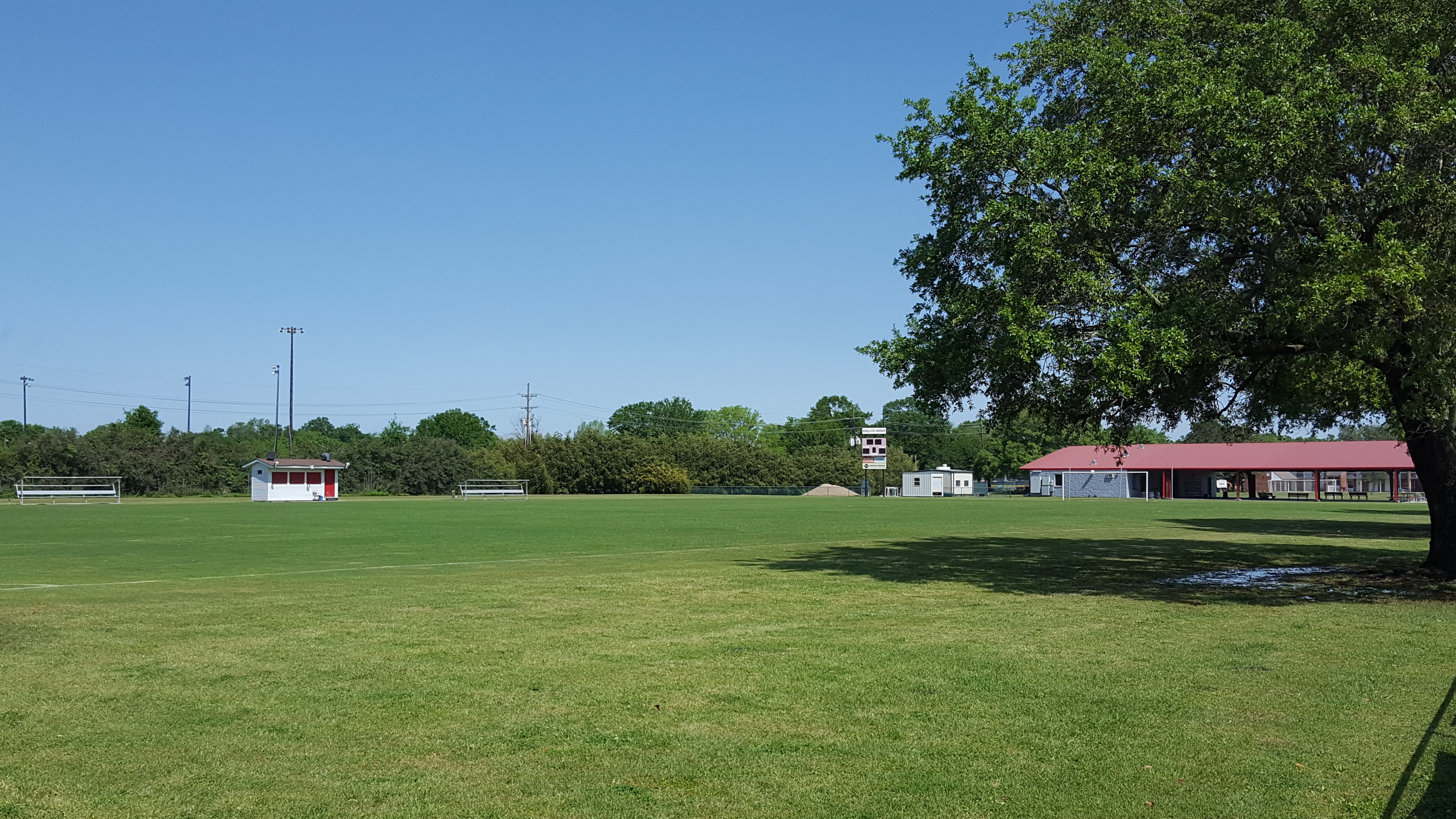
Nicholls Soccer Complex field

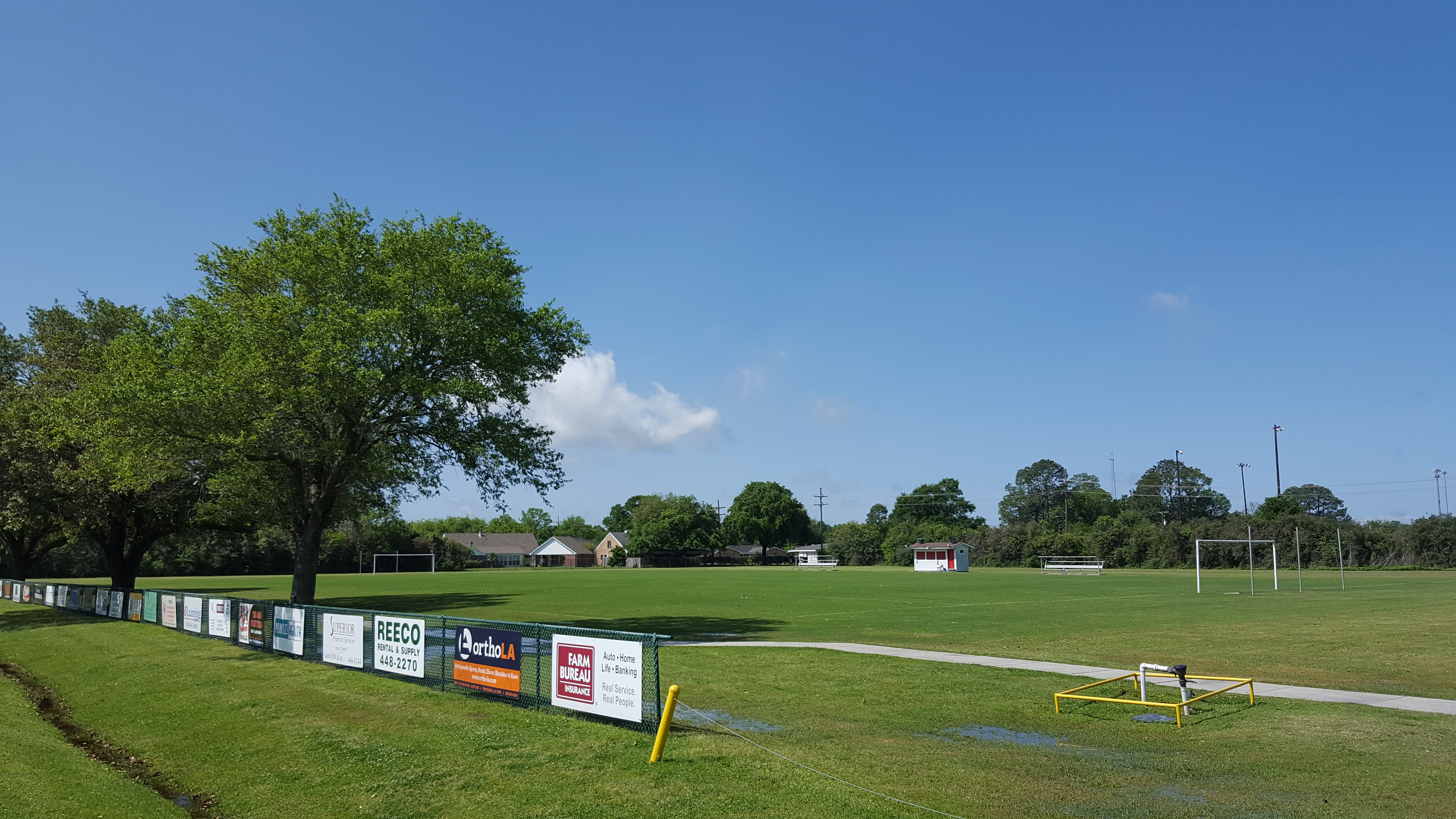
Nicholls Soccer Complex-soccer facility view

== See also ==
- Nicholls Colonels women's soccer
- List of soccer stadiums in the United States
