= Nicholls Colonels women's track and field =

University athletics team in Louisiana, US

- University: Nicholls State University
- Head coach: Stefanie Slekis
- Conference: Southland
- Location: Thibodaux, LA
- Nickname: Colonels
- Colors: Red and gray

The Nicholls Colonels women's track and field team represents Nicholls State University in NCAA Division I women's indoor and outdoor track and field. The team is a member of the Southland Conference. The team uses the Thibodaux Regional Sports Complex multi-purpose field and track and are coached by Stefanie Slekis.

== See also ==
- Nicholls Colonels
