= Atchafalaya Golf Course at Idlewild =

Golf course in Patterson, Louisiana

- Interactive map of Atchafalaya Golf Course at Idlewild
- 29.66702°N 91.29457°W

Club information
- Location: Patterson, Louisiana, U.S.
- Elevation: Sea level
- Established: 2006; 20 years ago
- Type: Public
- Tota holes: 18
- Tournaments: Intercollegiate; LHSAA
- Website: atchafalayagolf.com
- Designed by: von Hagge, Smelek and Baril
- Par: 72
- Length: 7,533 yards (6,888 m)
- Course rating: 76.4
- Slope rating: 136

The Atchafalaya Golf Course at Idlewild is an 18-hole championship public golf course in the southern United States, located outside of Patterson, Louisiana in the Atchafalaya Basin. It is a par-72 7,078 yards (6,472 m) course from the gator tees.

== Course history ==
The course was designed by von Hagge, Smelek, and Baril within the confines of Kemper Williams Park. The golf course is a member of the Louisiana Audubon Golf Trail featuring twelve golf courses around the state.

It was the home course for the Nicholls Colonels men's golf team from 2015 until 2018.

== Tournaments ==
- Atchafalaya Intercollegiate Golf Tournament (2015–2018)

2015 – Incarnate Word Cardinals
2016 – Louisiana–Monroe Warhawks
2017 – Louisiana–Monroe Warhawks
2018 – Texas–Rio Grande Valley Vaqueros

- Bayou Classic

2018

- LGA Senior Four-Ball Championship

2017

- LHSAA Golf Tournaments

== Club facilities ==
The venue offers a complete practice facility.

== See also ==
- Nicholls Colonels
