= Nicholls Colonels softball =

American college softball team

- 2025 Nicholls Colonels softball team
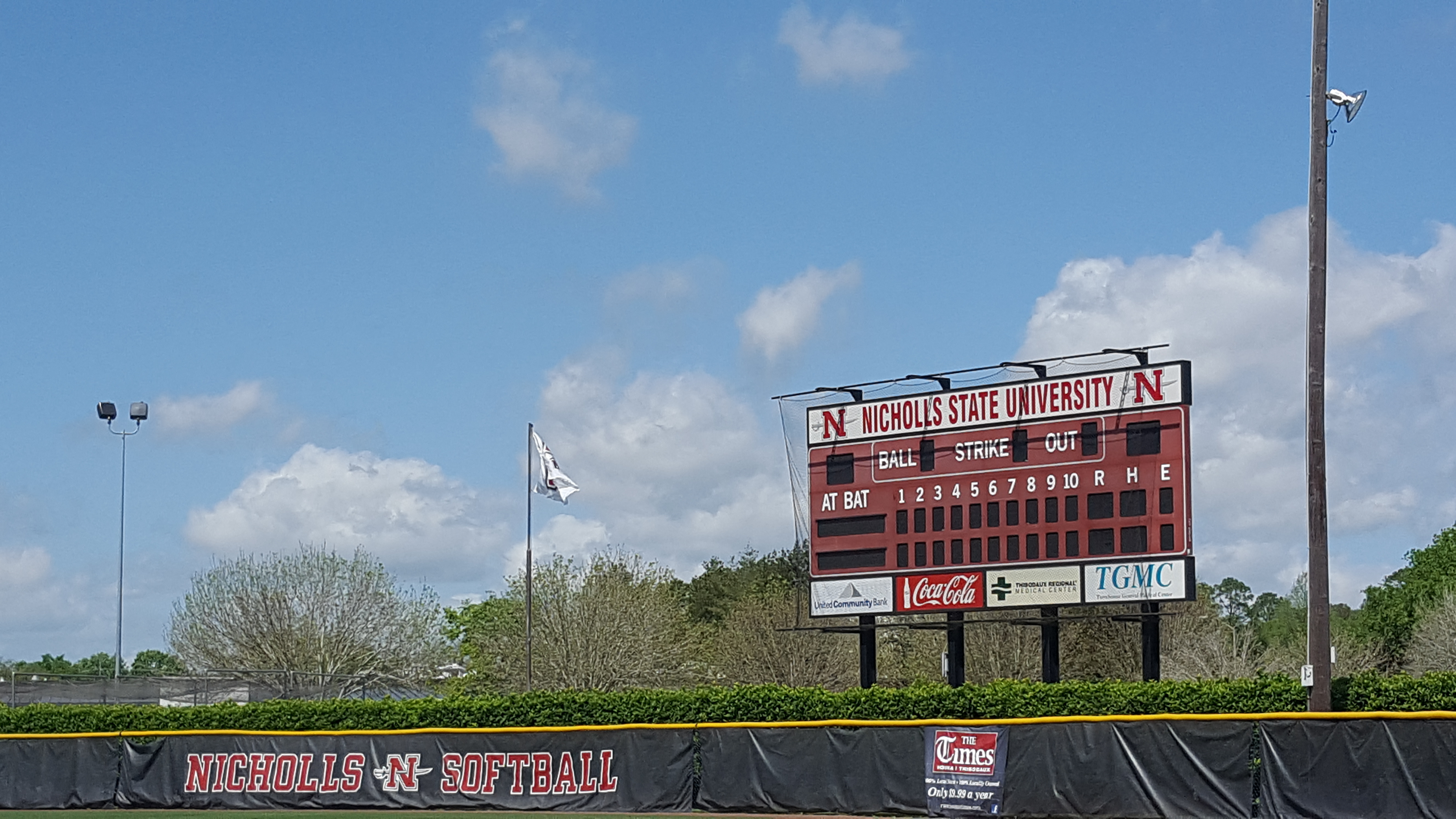
- Founded: 1981 (44 years ago)
- University: Nicholls State University
- Head coach: Ron Frost Jr. (1st season)
- Conference: Southland
- Location: Thibodaux, LA
- Home stadium: Swanner Field at Geo Surfaces Park (Capacity: 500)
- Nickname: Colonels
- Colors: Red and gray

NCAA Tournament appearances
- 1995, 1996, 1997

Conference tournament championships
- 1996, 1997

Regular-season conference championships
- 1992, 1994, 1995, 1996, 2018

The Nicholls Colonels softball team represents Nicholls State University in NCAA Division I college softball. The team participates in the Southland Conference. Nicholls' first softball team was fielded in 1981. The team plays its home games at 500-seat Swanner Field at Geo Surfaces Park and are coached by Ron Frost Jr.

== History ==
The Colonels's inaugural season was in 1981. The Colonels have won five Southland Conference regular season titles (1992, 1994, 1995, 1996, 2018) and two Southland Conference Tournament titles (1996 and 1997), the Colonels have appeared in the NCAA Division I softball tournament three times (1995, 1996, 1997) with a tournament record of 3–6.

== Year-by-year results ==
Season	Conference	Coach	Overall				Conference				Notes
Season	Conference	Coach	Games	Win	Loss	Tie	Games	Win	Loss	Tie	Notes
1983	Independent	Lynn Oberbillig	44	30	14	0	0	0	0	0	
1984	Independent	Lynn Oberbillig	51	39	12	0	0	0	0	0	
1985	Gulf Star	Lynn Oberbillig	62	47	14	1	16	12	4	0	
1986	Gulf Star	Lynn Oberbillig	58	31	27	0	20	13	7	0	
1987	Gulf Star	Lynn Oberbillig	57	44	13	0	20	18	2	0	Gulf Star Regular Season Champion; National Women's Invitational Division I Regional Tournament
1988	Independent	Lynn Oberbillig	52	26	26	0	0	0	0	0	
1989	Independent	Lynn Oberbillig	63	35	28	0	0	0	0	0	
1990	Independent	Lynn Oberbillig	57	32	25	0	0	0	0	0	
1991	Independent	Cathy Compton	49	24	24	1	0	0	0	0	
1992	Southland	Cathy Compton	53	36	16	1	26	17	9	0	SLC Regular Season Champion
1993	Southland	Cathy Compton	48	32	14	2	26	15	6	1	
1994	Southland	Cathy Compton	61	52	17	0	28	21	7	0	3 game playoff with McNeese not included. SLC Regular Season Champion
1995	Southland	Cathy Compton	65	56	9	0	30	38	2	0	SLC Regular Season Champion; SLC Tournament Champion; NCAA Division I Regional Tournament
1996	Southland	Lu Harris-Champer	66	46	19	1	24	19	5	0	SLC Regular Season Champion; SLC Tournament Champion; NCAA Division I Regional Tournament
1997	Southland	Lu Harris-Champer	71	48	23	0	23	16	7	0	NCAA Division I Regional Tournament
1998	Southland	Patti Holthaus	59	43	16	0	27	23	4	0	
1999	Southland	Patti Holthaus	60	13	47	0	27	7	20	0	
2000	Southland	Patti Holthaus	61	14	47	0	27	4	23	0	
2001	Southland	Patti Holthaus	55	21	34	0	27	5	22	0	
2002	Southland	Phyllis Guedry	57	15	42	0	27	7	20	0	
2003	Southland	Phyllis Guedry	56	29	27	0	27	13	14	0	
2004	Southland	Phyllis Guedry	51	24	29	0	26	12	14	0	
2005	Southland	Jenny Parsons	52	18	34	0	27	10	17	0	
2006	Southland	Jenny Parsons	56	23	33	0	26	11	15	0	
2007	Southland	Jenny Parsons	55	27	28	0	26	15	11	0	
2008	Southland	Jenny Parsons	54	31	28	0	29	15	14	0	
2009	Southland	Jenny Parsons	55	30	25	0	30	14	16	0	
2010	Southland	Jenny Parsons	47	25	22	0	30	16	14	0	
2011	Southland	Jenny Parsons	52	15	37	0	29	7	22	0	
2012	Southland	Angel Santiago	45	14	31	0	20	8	12	0	
2013	Southland	Angel Santiago	48	22	26	0	25	12	13	0	
2014	Southland	Angel Santiago	53	19	34	0	25	9	16	0	
2015	Southland	Angel Santiago	48	26	22	0	26	12	14	0	
2016	Southland	Angel Santiago	56	39	17	0	26	21	5	0	
2017	Southland	Angel Santiago	57	37	20	0	27	19	8	0	
2018	Southland	Angel Santiago	55	40	15	0	27	21	6	0	SLC Regular Season Champion
2019	Southland	Angel Santiago	56	34	22	0	27	21	6	0	
2020	Southland	Angel Santiago	26	12	14	0	3	2	1	0	Season cut short by the COVID-19 pandemic
2021	Southland	Angel Santiago	40	12	28	0	27	5	22	0	
2022	Southland	Justin Lewis	50	12	38	0	28	4	14	0	
2023	Southland	Justin Lewis	53	29	24	0	24	13	11	0	

== Postseason appearances ==
=== NCAA Division I Tournament results ===
The Colonels have appeared in three NCAA Division I Tournaments, all as Nicholls State University. Their combined record is 3–6.

Year	Round	Opponent	Result/Score
NCAA Division I Tournament results
1995	First Game; Second Game; Third Game	Louisiana–Lafayette; Louisiana Tech; Washington	L 1–5; W 4–1; L 2–7
1996	First Game; Second Game; Third Game; Fourth Game	Louisiana–Lafayette; Minnesota; Nebraska; Louisiana–Lafayette	L 0–1; W 2–1; W 2–0; L 1–2
1997	First Game; Second Game	UCLA; Louisiana–Monroe	L 0–3; L 0–1

=== NCAA Division I Tournament play-in results ===
The Colonels have appeared in three NCAA Division I Tournament Play-Ins, all as Nicholls State University. Their combined record is 6–0.

Year	Round	Opponent	Result/Score
NCAA Division I Tournament results
1995	First Game; Second Game	Florida A&M; Florida A&M	W 9–0; W 15–0
1996	First Game; Second Game	Hampton; Hampton	W 15–0; W 13–0
1997	First Game; Second Game	Florida Atlantic; Florida Atlantic	W 1–0; W 8–0

=== NWIT Division I Tournament results ===
The 1987 team appeared in the women's NWIT tournament winning one of three games.

Year	Round	Opponent	Result/Score
NWIT Division I Tournament results
1987	First Game; Second Game; Third Game	Oklahoma; Western Illinois; Akron	W 8–5; L 0–1; L 2–3

== See also ==
- List of NCAA Division I softball programs
