= Nicholls Colonels cross country =

American college cross country team

- Founded: 2008
- University: Nicholls State University
- Head coach: Stefanie Slekis
- Conference: Southland
- Location: Thibodaux, LA
- Course: Nicholls Farm
- Nickname: Colonels
- Colors: Red and gray

The Nicholls Colonels cross country program represents Nicholls State University in Thibodaux, Louisiana, United States. The program includes separate men's and women's cross country teams, both of which compete in the Southland Conference, which is part of the National Collegiate Athletic Association's Division I. The teams host home meets at the Nicholls Farm and are coached by Stefanie Slekis.

== See also ==
- Nicholls Colonels
