= Colonel Tillou =

Athletics mascot of Nicholls State University

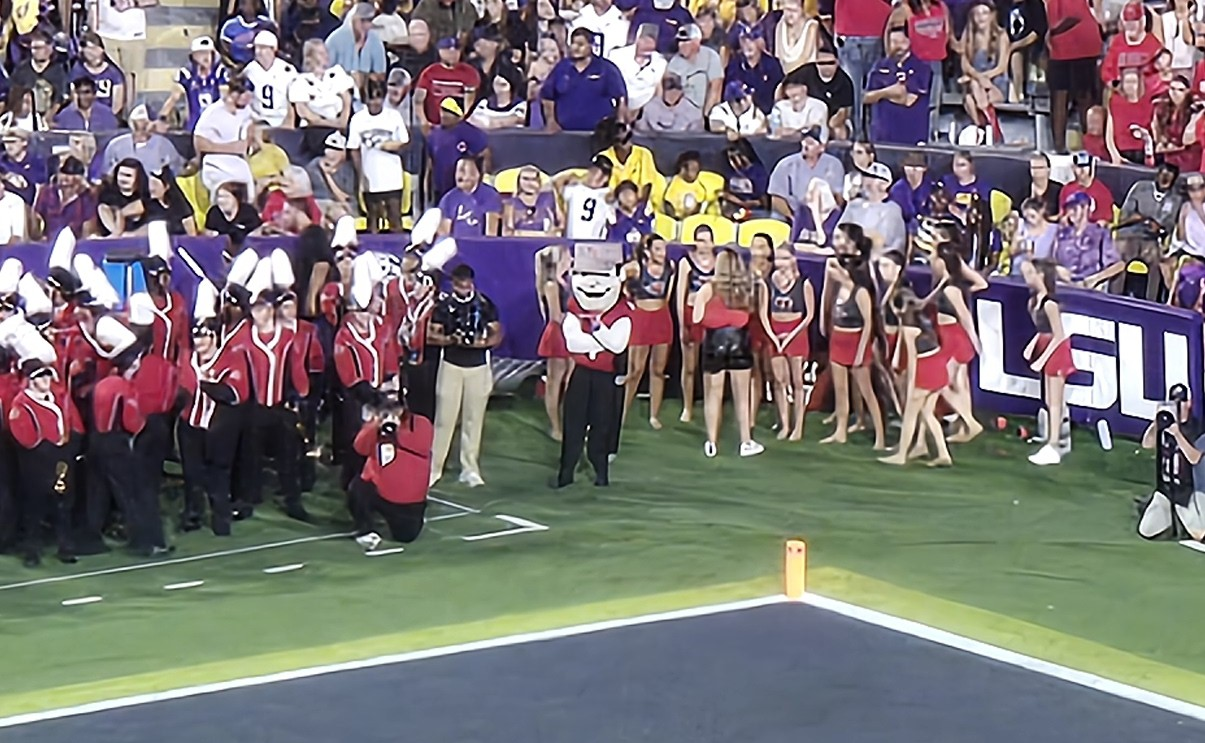
- Colonel Tillou at Tiger Stadium (LSU)
- University: Nicholls State University
- Conference: Southland
- Description: Military officer
- Origin of name: Student election
- First seen: 1962, 2009 (Current version)

Colonel Tillou is the official athletics mascot for Nicholls State University. The modern version of Col. Tillou wears a bright red uniform topped off with a contemporary-style military officer's cap.

== History ==
By 2004, an older version of the Colonel Tillou was considered antiquated and the decision was made to retire the mascot. Nicholls State University President Stephen Hulbert stated that "The Colonel is and will remain the mascot designation for Nicholls State University and its intercollegiate athletics programs." Hulbert tasked student leaders to work on a suitable replacement. That process lasted six years and the "new" Colonel Tillou was introduced to the campus community in August 2009. It has been considered to look like a Red Army Soldier.
