= Swanner Field at Geo Surfaces Park =

Softball venue

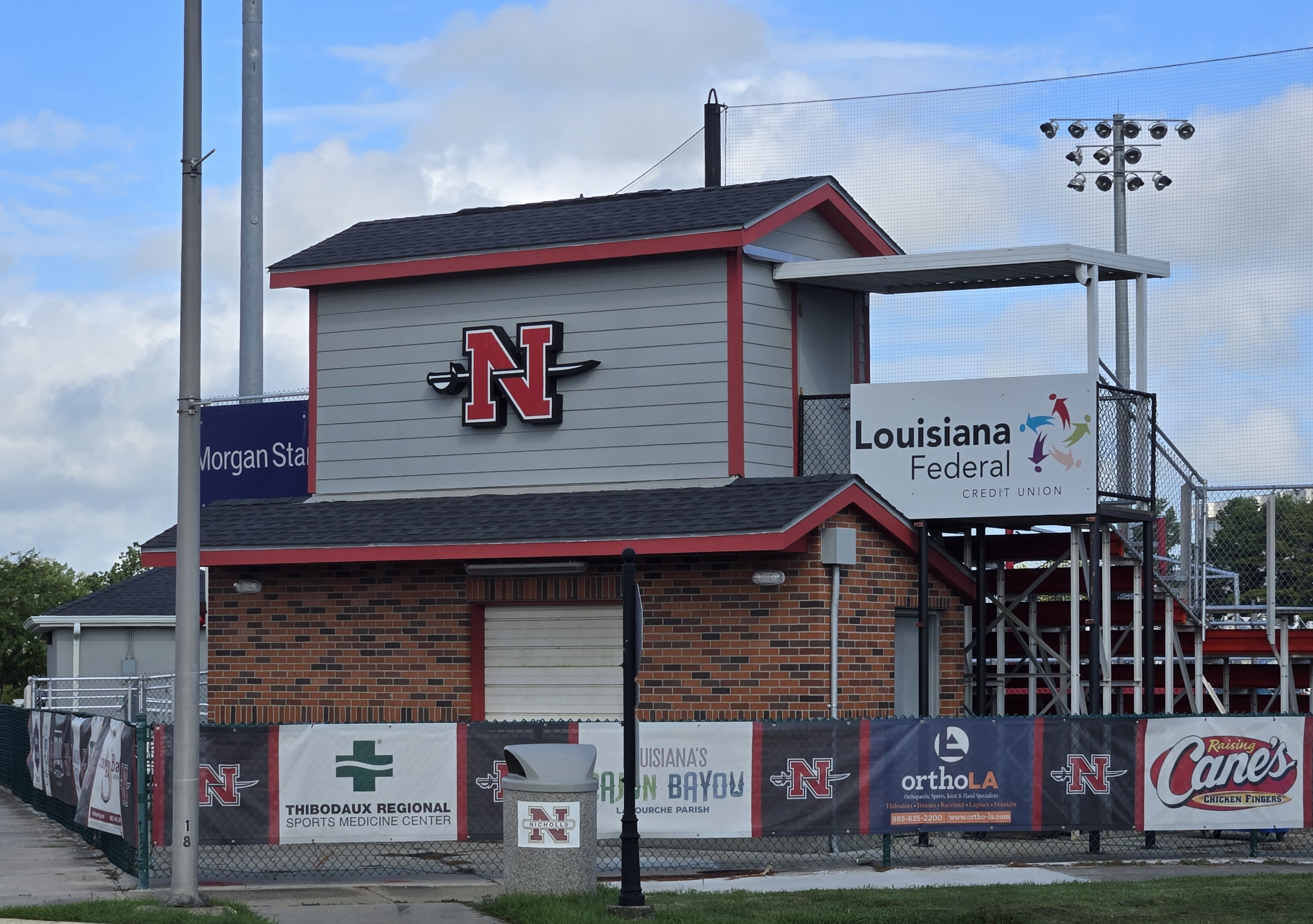
- Interactive map of Swanner Field at Geo Surfaces Park
- Former names: Colonels Softball Diamond, Colonels Softball Complex
- Location: Thibodaux, LA, United States
- Coordinates: 29°47′20″N 90°48′08″W
- Owner: Nicholls State University
- Operator: Nicholls Athletics Department
- Capacity: 500
- Surface: Synthetic turf
- Scoreboard: Electric

Construction
- Opened: 1981
- Renovated: 2018

Tenant
- Nicholls Colonels softball (NCAA)

Swanner Field at Geo Surfaces Park is a softball venue in Thibodaux, Louisiana, United States. It is home to the Nicholls Colonels softball team of the NCAA Division I Southland Conference. The venue has a capacity of 500.

== History ==
The park opened in 1981 was formerly named Colonels Softball Diamond and Colonels Softball Complex. Prior to the 2018 season, the park underwent major renovations. It included a new synthetic turf infield by Geo Surfaces, new lights and renovated dugouts and seating. The renovations were funded by donations from Neal Swanner and the Norman Swanner Foundation. In honor of those donations, the playing surface was named Swanner Field.

== Tournaments ==
In addition to regular season play, the softball complex was the site of the 1996 Southland Conference softball tournament.

== Gallery ==
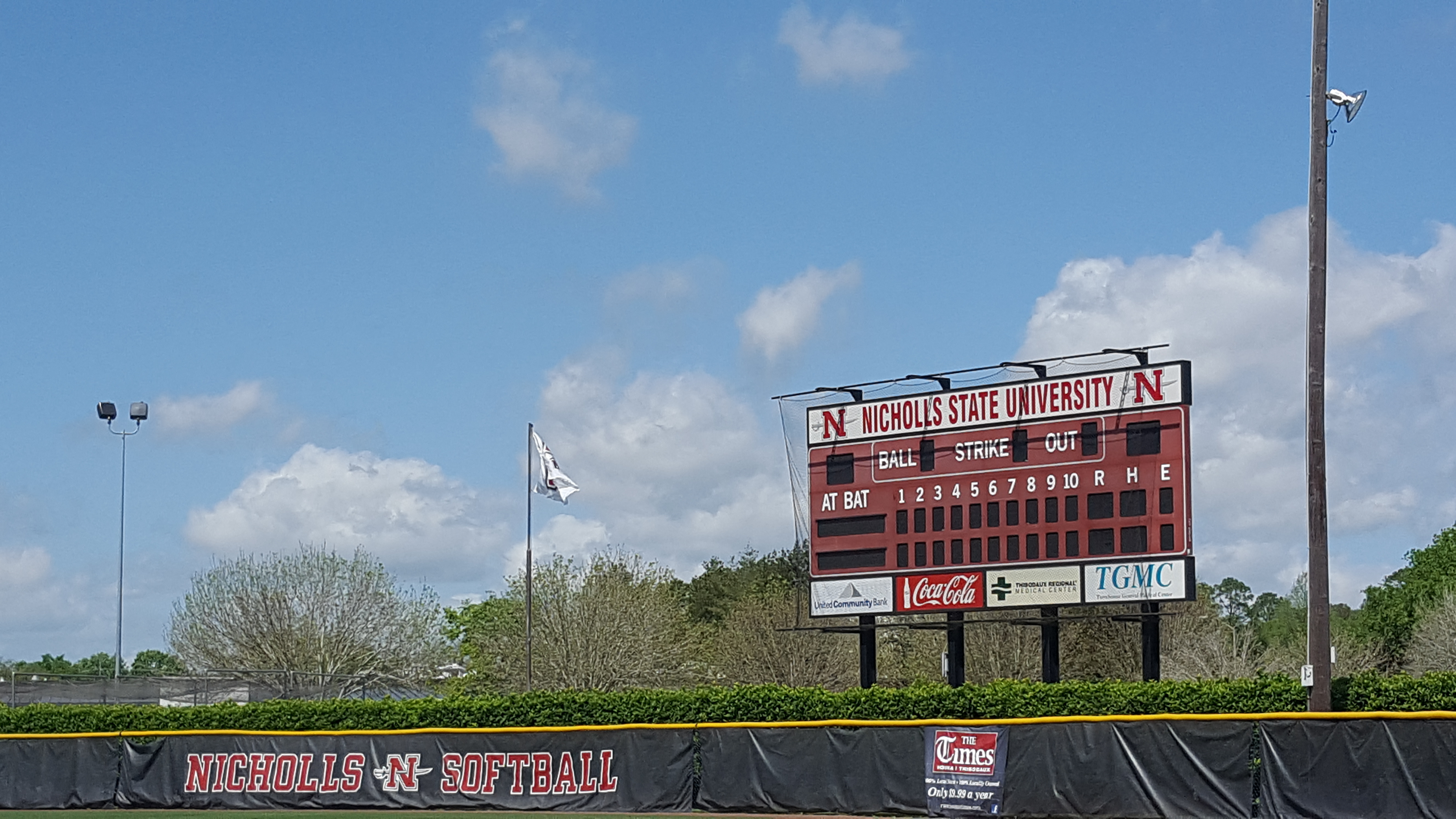
Swanner Field at Geo Surfaces Park outfield

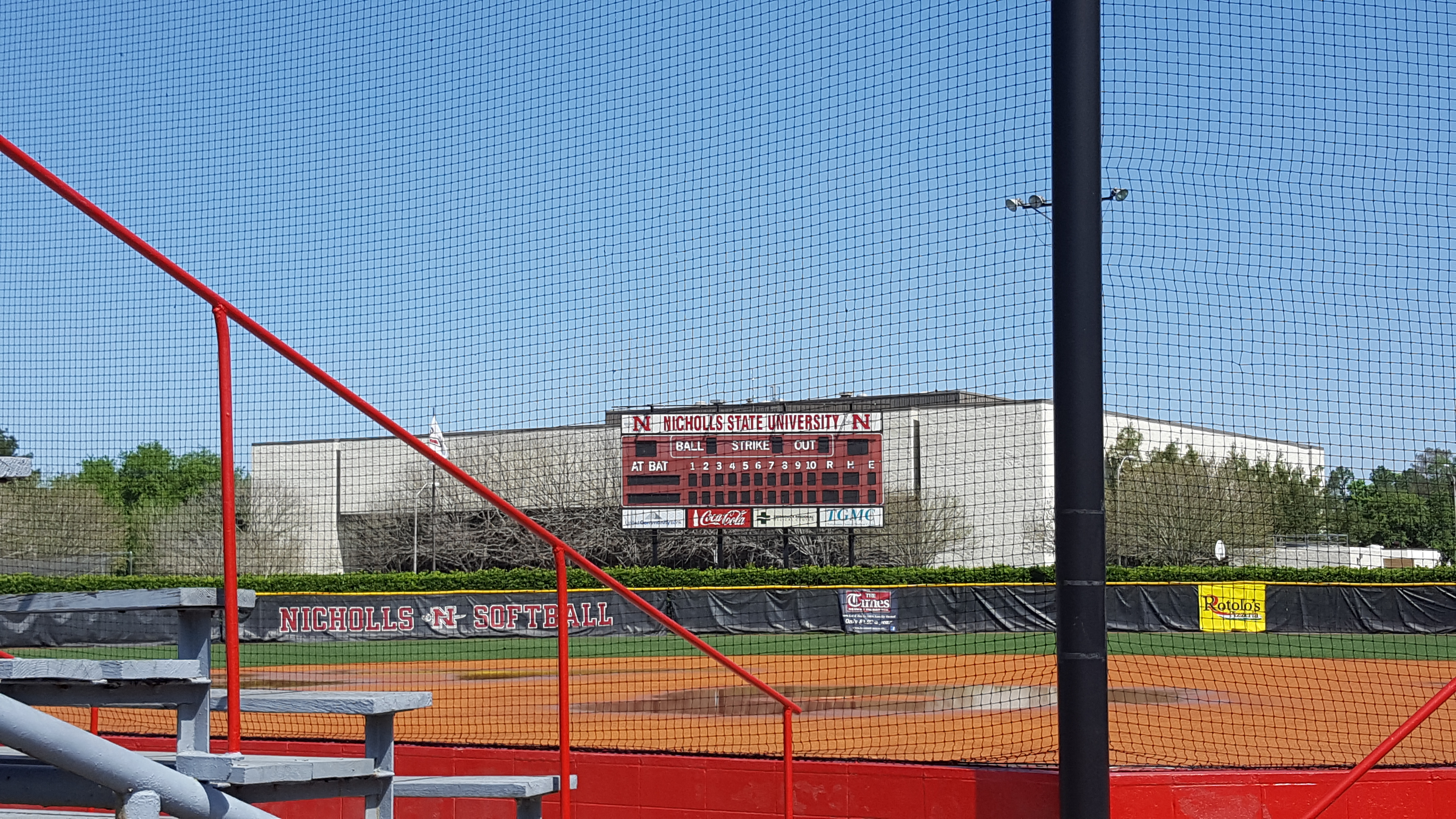
Swanner Field at Geo Surfaces Park Scoreboard

== See also ==
- Nicholls Colonels softball
- Nicholls Colonels
