= Nicholls Colonels women's soccer =

American college soccer team

- University: Nicholls State University
- Athletic director: Jonathan Terrell
- Head coach: Kristy Helmers (1st season)
- Conference: Southland; NCAA Division I Division
- Location: Thibodaux, Louisiana, US
- Stadium: Thibodaux Regional Sports Complex 2022–; Nicholls Soccer Complex 1998–21; (capacity: 1,000)
- Nickname: Colonels
- Colors: Red and gray
Home	Away

The Nicholls Colonels women's soccer team represents Nicholls State University in Thibodaux, Louisiana, United States. The school's team currently competes in the Southland Conference, which is part of the National Collegiate Athletic Association's Division I. Nicholls' first women's soccer team was fielded in 1998. The team played its home games at the 1,000-seat Nicholls Soccer Complex through the 2021 season. For the 2022 season, the Colonels began playing at the newly constructed multi-purpose field at the Thibodaux Regional Sports Complex. The team is coached by Kristy Helmers.

== Stadium ==
Thibodaux Regional Sports Complex
- Interactive map of Thibodaux Regional Sports Complex
- Location: 294 Bowie Road; Thibodaux, Louisiana
- Coordinates: 29°46′53.4″N 90°48′12.3″W
- Owner: Thibodaux Regional Medical Center
- Operator: Thibodaux Regional Medical Center
- Seating type: bleacher bench
- Capacity: 1,000
- Surface: artificial turf
- Scoreboard: electronic, digital
- Field size: 117 X 70 yards

Construction
- Groundbreaking: February 26, 2021
- Built: 2022
- Opened: May 6, 2022

Tenant
- Nicholls (NCAA)

=== Current stadium ===
Thibodaux Regional Sports Complex has been the home of the Nicholls Colonels women's soccer team since its completion in 2022. The stadium seats 1,000 spectators with bleacher seating and has a playing surface that measures 117 yards (107 m) by 70 yards (64 m). Owned by the Thibodaux Regional Medical Center, the multi-purpose stadium is part of a sports complex supporting several Nicholls State University athletics sports teams.

==== Attendance summary ====
Below is the Colonels' yearly attendance summary since 2022.

Yearly Home Attendance
Season	Average	High
Nicholls
2024		
2023	217	433
2022	253	622

=== Original stadium ===
The on campus Nicholls Soccer Complex was the Colonels' home pitch from 1998–2021. Permanent seating capacity at that stadium is 1,000.

==== Attendance summary ====
Below is the Colonels' yearly attendance summary from 2010 to 2021.

Yearly Home Attendance
Season	Average	High
Nicholls
2021	120	237
2020	96	167
2019	48	211
2018	108	231
2017	224	339
2016	209	382
2015	481	781
2014	326	387
2013	235	386
2012	288	345
2011	135	188
2010	170	213
2009	146	252
2008	143	197
2007	102	150
2006	109	207
2005	70	89
2004	100	157
2003	132	545
2002	86	213

== NCAA Year-by-year results ==
Season	Conference	Coach	Overall				Conference				Notes
Season	Conference	Coach	Games	Win	Loss	Tie	Games	Win	Loss	Tie	Notes
1998	Southland	Mark Bimah	15	0	14	1	8	0	8	0	
1999	Southland	Mark Bimah	19	2	16	1	12	1	10	1	
2000	Southland	Mark Bimah	18	2	16	0	12	1	11	0	
		Mark Bimah	52	4	46	2	32	2	29	1	
2001	Southland	James Zakel	17	3	13	1	11	2	8	1	
2002	Southland	James Zakel	20	2	17	1	12	0	12	0	
2003	Southland	James Zakel	20	4	16	0	12	1	11	0	
		James Zakel	57	9	46	2	35	3	31	1	
2004	Southland	Cindy Piper	19	3	13	3	12	2	7	3	
2005	Southland	Cindy Piper	15	2	13	0	7	0	7	0	
2006	Southland	Cindy Piper	19	4	14	1	8	1	7	0	
2007	Southland	Cindy Piper	20	2	17	1	9	1	8	0	
2008	Southland	Cindy Piper	18	2	16	0	9	0	9	0	
		Cindy Piper	91	13	73	5	45	4	38	3	
2009	Southland	Dylan Harrison	17	6	10	1	9	0	8	1	
2010	Southland	Dylan Harrison	18	6	10	2	9	0	8	1	
2011	Southland	Dylan Harrison	19	6	12	1	9	0	9	0	
2012	Southland	Dylan Harrison	18	5	13	0	8	0	8	0	
2013	Southland	Dylan Harrison	20	12	6	2	12	6	5	1	
2014	Southland	Dylan Harrison	20	10	10	0	12	6	6	0	
2015	Southland	Dylan Harrison	17	6	10	1	11	4	7	0	
		Dylan Harrison	129	51	71	7	71	16	51	3	
2016	Southland	Michael "Mac" McBride	16	6	8	2	11	3	6	2	
2017	Southland	Michael "Mac" McBride	18	6	11	1	11	3	7	1	
2018	Southland	Michael "Mac" McBride	18	3	15	0	11	1	10	0	
		Michael "Mac" McBride	52	15	34	3	33	7	23	3	
2019	Southland	Danny Free	18	3	14	1	11	0	11	0	
2020	Southland	Alexsis Cable	16	0	15	1	11	0	10	1	
2021	Southland	Rod Podeyn	18	0	18	0	12	0	12	0	
2022	Southland	Rod Podeyn	19	2	16	1	12	0	12	0	
2023	Southland	Rod Podeyn	19	1	17	1	10	0	9	1	
		Rod Podeyn	56	3	51	2	34	0	33	1	
2024	Southland	Kristy Helmers									
		Totals	471	98	350	23	272	32	226	13	

== See also ==
- Nicholls Colonels
