= Ben Meyer Diamond at Ray E. Didier Field =

Baseball venue in Louisiana, United States

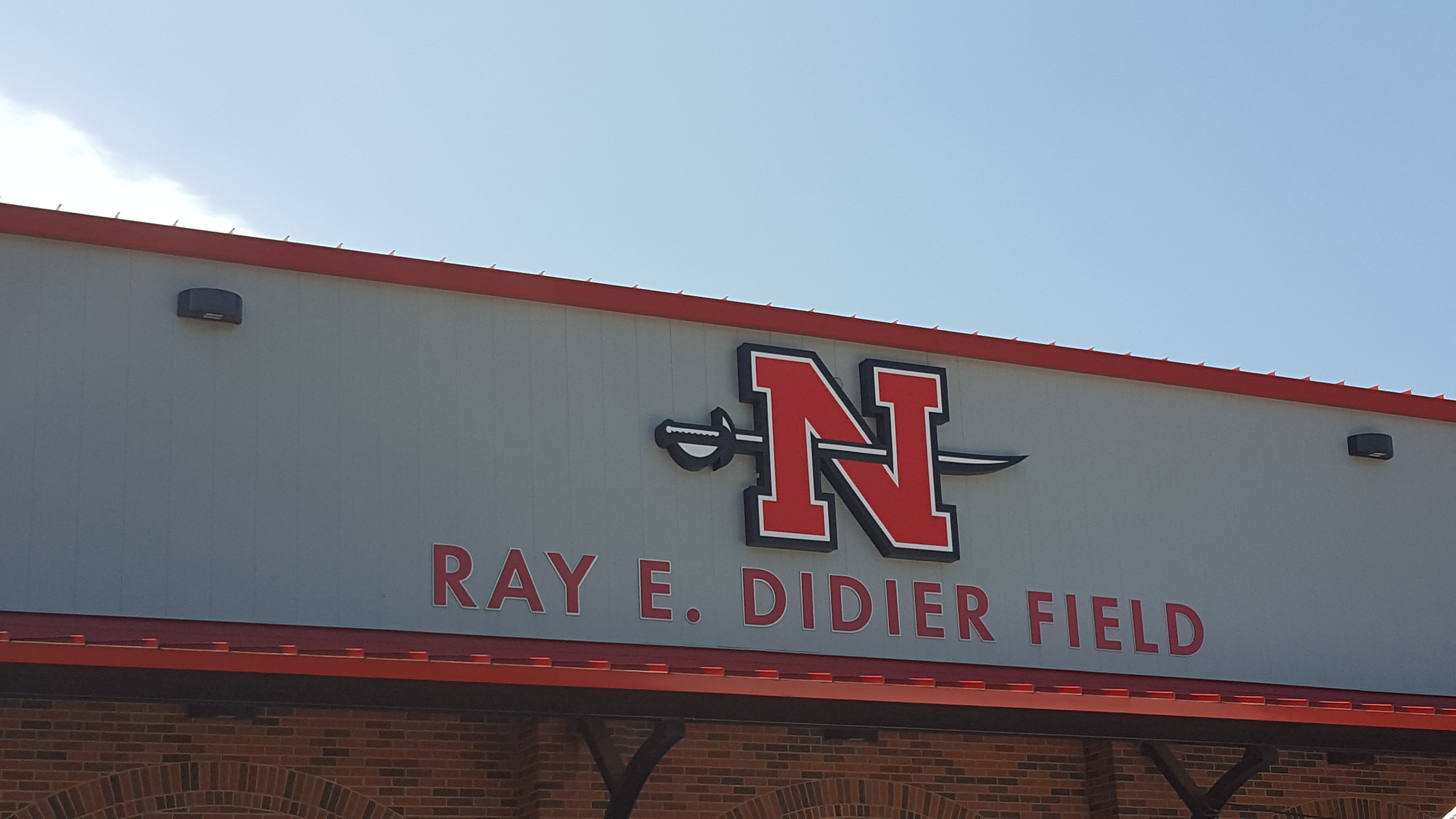
- Interactive map of Ben Meyer Diamond at Ray E. Didier Field
- Location: Thibodaux, Louisiana, United States
- Coordinates: 29°47′10″N 90°48′08″W
- Owner: Nicholls State University
- Operator: Nicholls Athletics Department
- Capacity: 2,100
- Surface: Geo-Surfaces artificial turf (infield), Natural grass (outfield)
- Scoreboard: Electronic
- Field size: 331 ft. (LF), 400 ft. (CF), 331 ft. (RF)

Construction
- Opened: 1960
- Renovated: 2016

Tenant
- Nicholls Colonels baseball (NCAA)

Ben Meyer Diamond at Ray E. Didier Field is a baseball venue in Thibodaux, Louisiana, United States. It is home to the Nicholls Colonels baseball team of the NCAA Division I Southland Conference. Opened in 1960, the venue has a capacity of 2,100 spectators. The grandstand features chairback seating and a pressbox. The field is named after Raymond E. Didier, head baseball coach from 1964 to 1973 and athletic director from 1963 to 1978. The diamond is named in honor of Ben Meyer.

== History ==
The first game was played in 1960. A covered batting cage was built directly adjacent to the stadium along the third base side of the ballpark.

In 2016, the stadium went through a major renovation. A new press box with two radio booths was built at the stadium along with the installation of a new elevator. In addition to the new press box, a press room, visiting media room and new concession stand were built on the ground level. Two new luxury suites were built at the stadium and new stadium lighting was also installed. The second phase of the renovation involved construction of a new field house with a rooftop hospitality area, new locker rooms, coaches offices and public restrooms. The project also includes an elevator and unified dugout-to-dugout bleachers with 400 chair back seats.

On May 7, 2017, the diamond was renamed in honor of the late Ben Meyer. The infield was also resurfaced with Geo-Surfaces artificial turf.

The future third phase of the renovation will include a new wrought iron gated entryway, a new plaza area and a new video board.

== Gallery ==
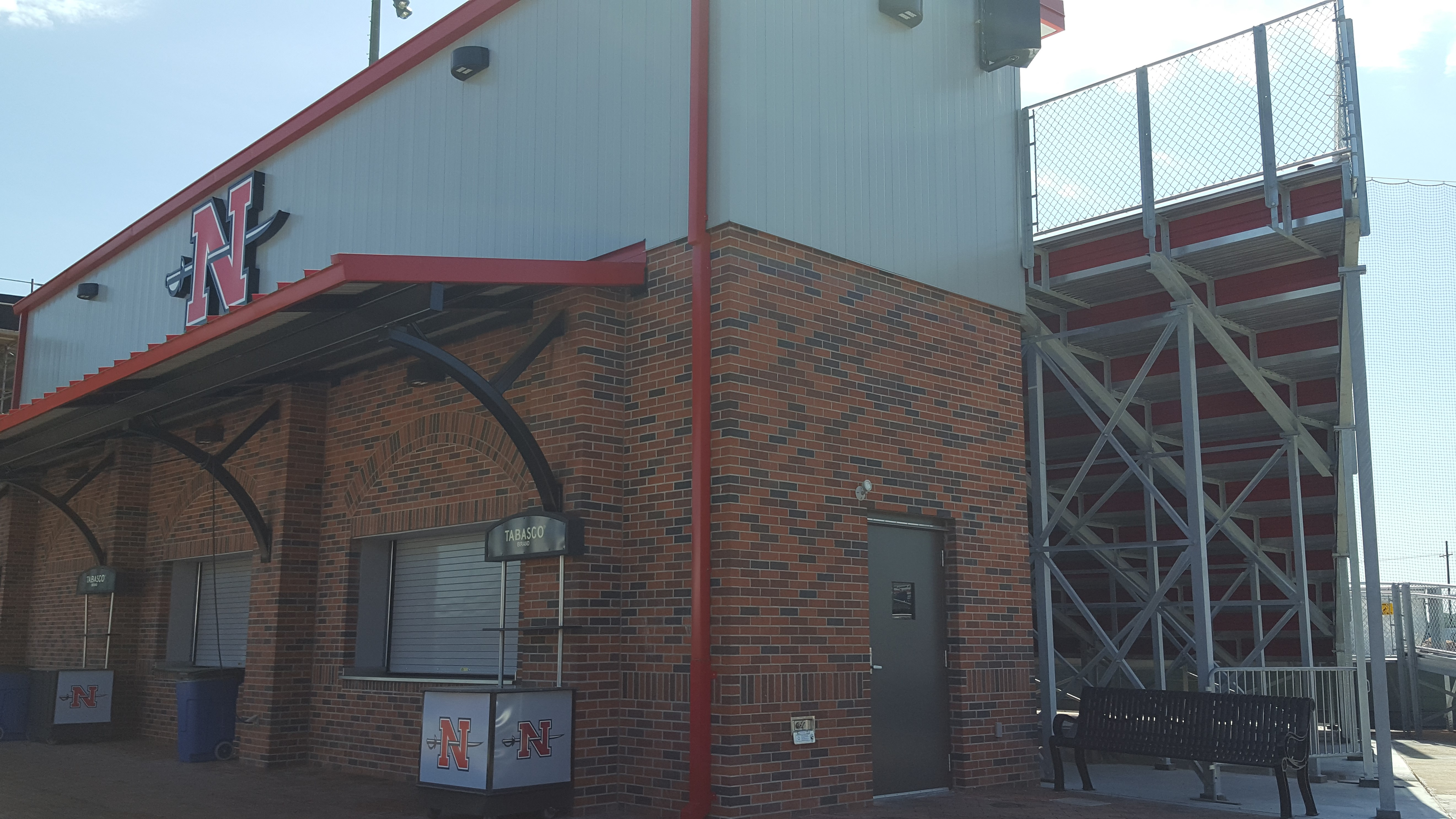
Ben Meyer Diamond at Ray E. Didier Field Grandstand

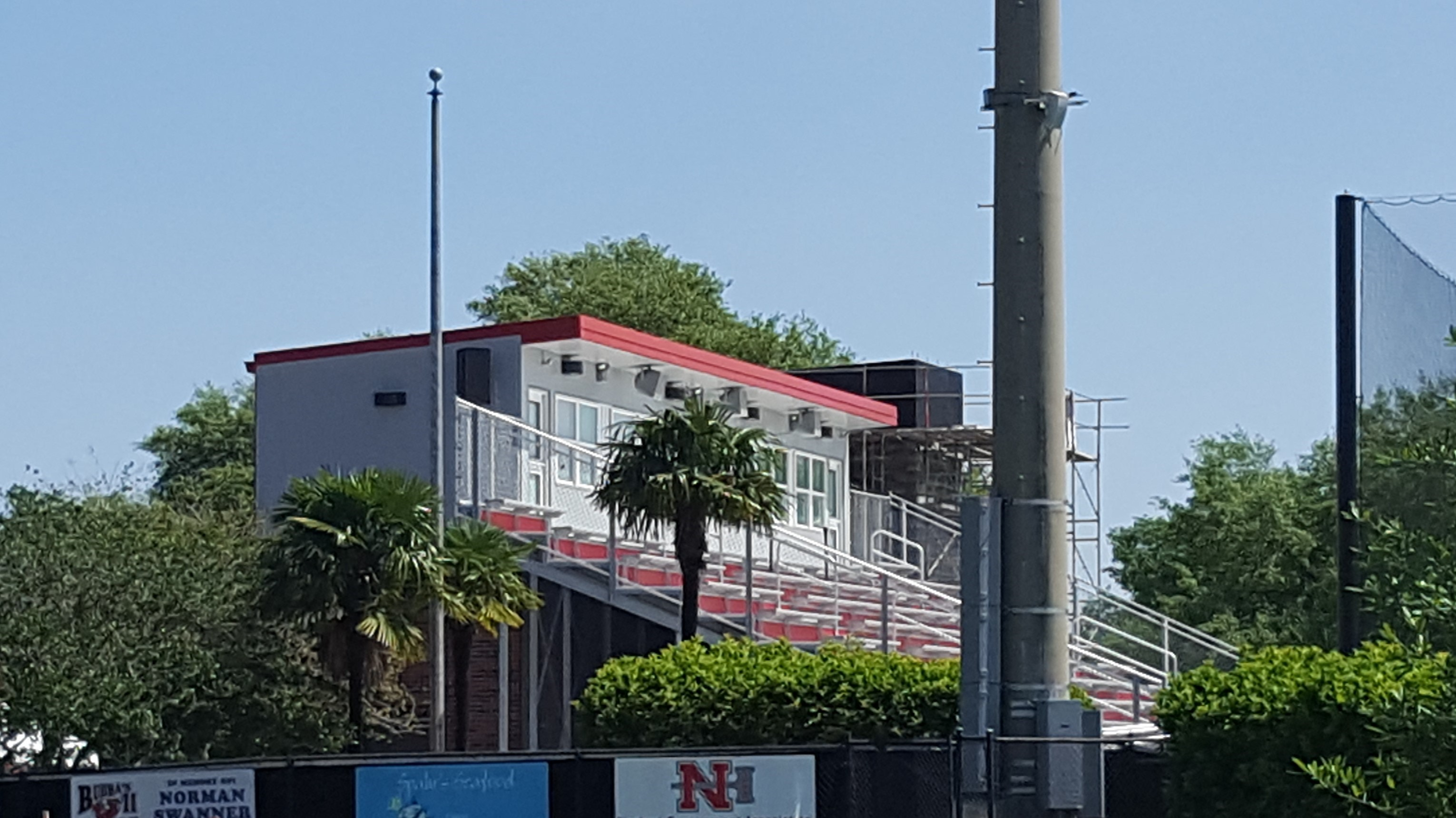
Ben Meyer Diamond at Ray E. Didier Field Grandstand-street view

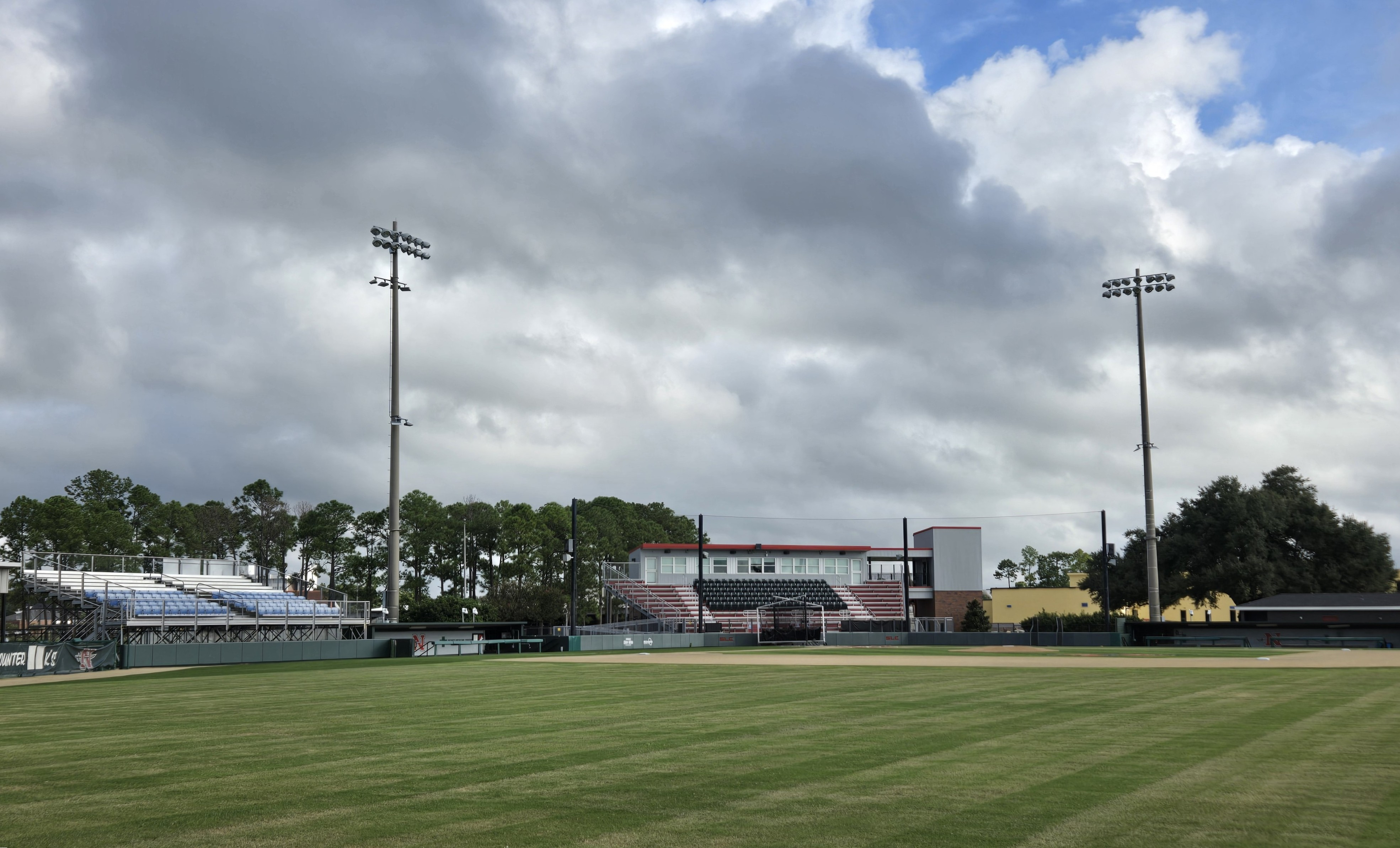
Ben Meyer Diamond at Ray E. Didier Field Grandstand and Interior

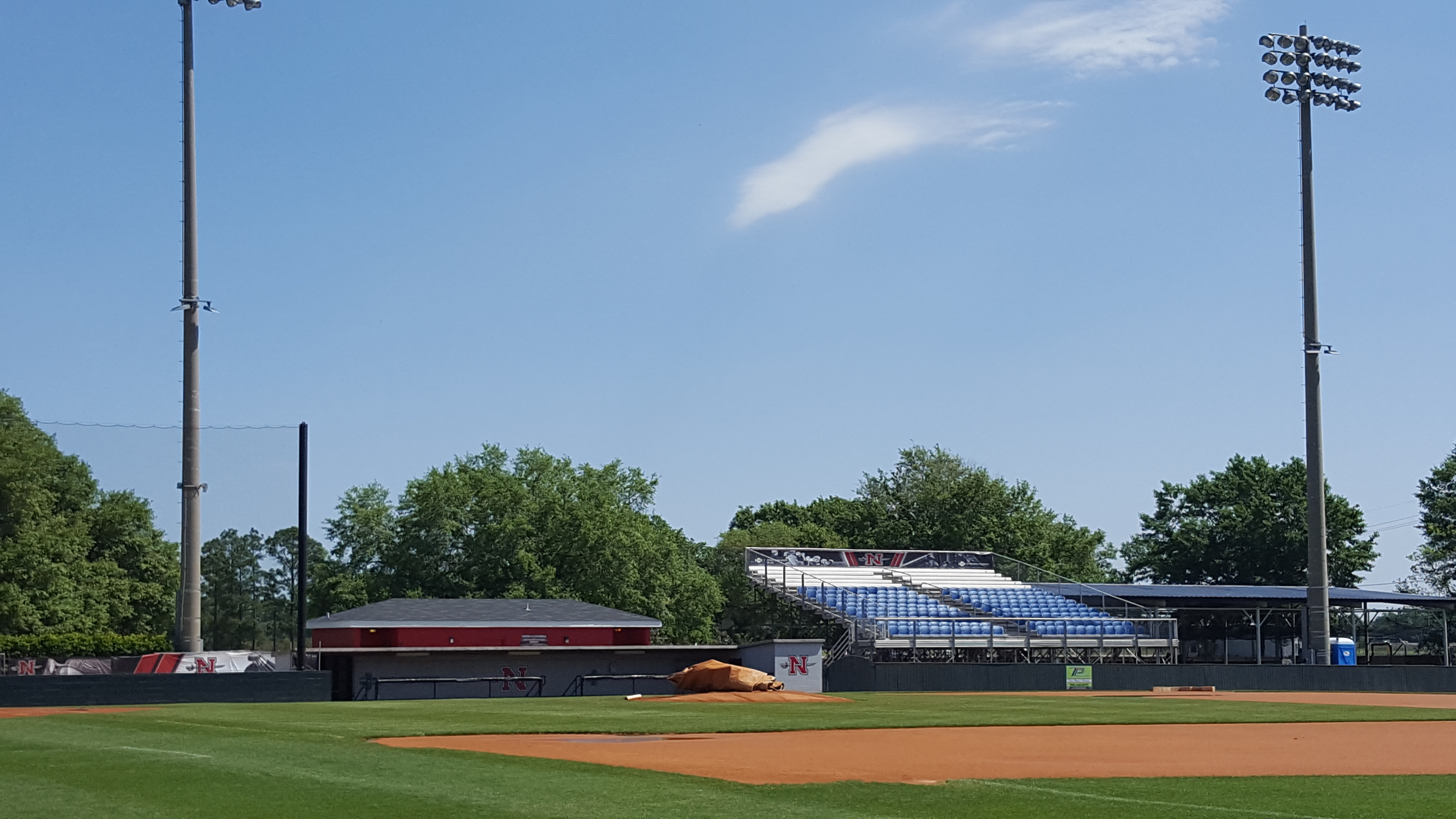
Ben Meyer Diamond at Ray E. Didier Field Dugout and Batting Cages

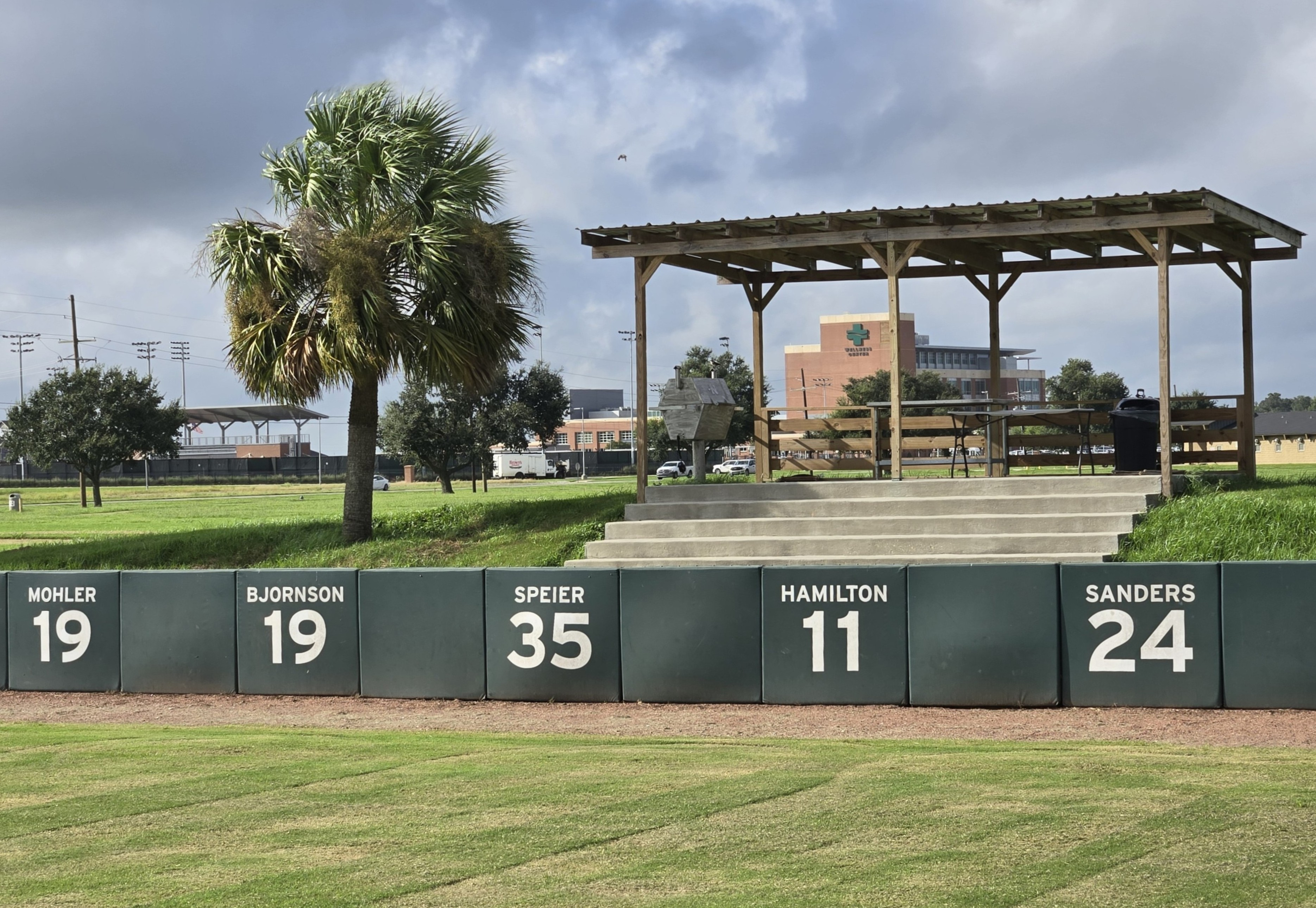
Ben Meyer Diamond at Ray E. Didier Field Retired Numbers

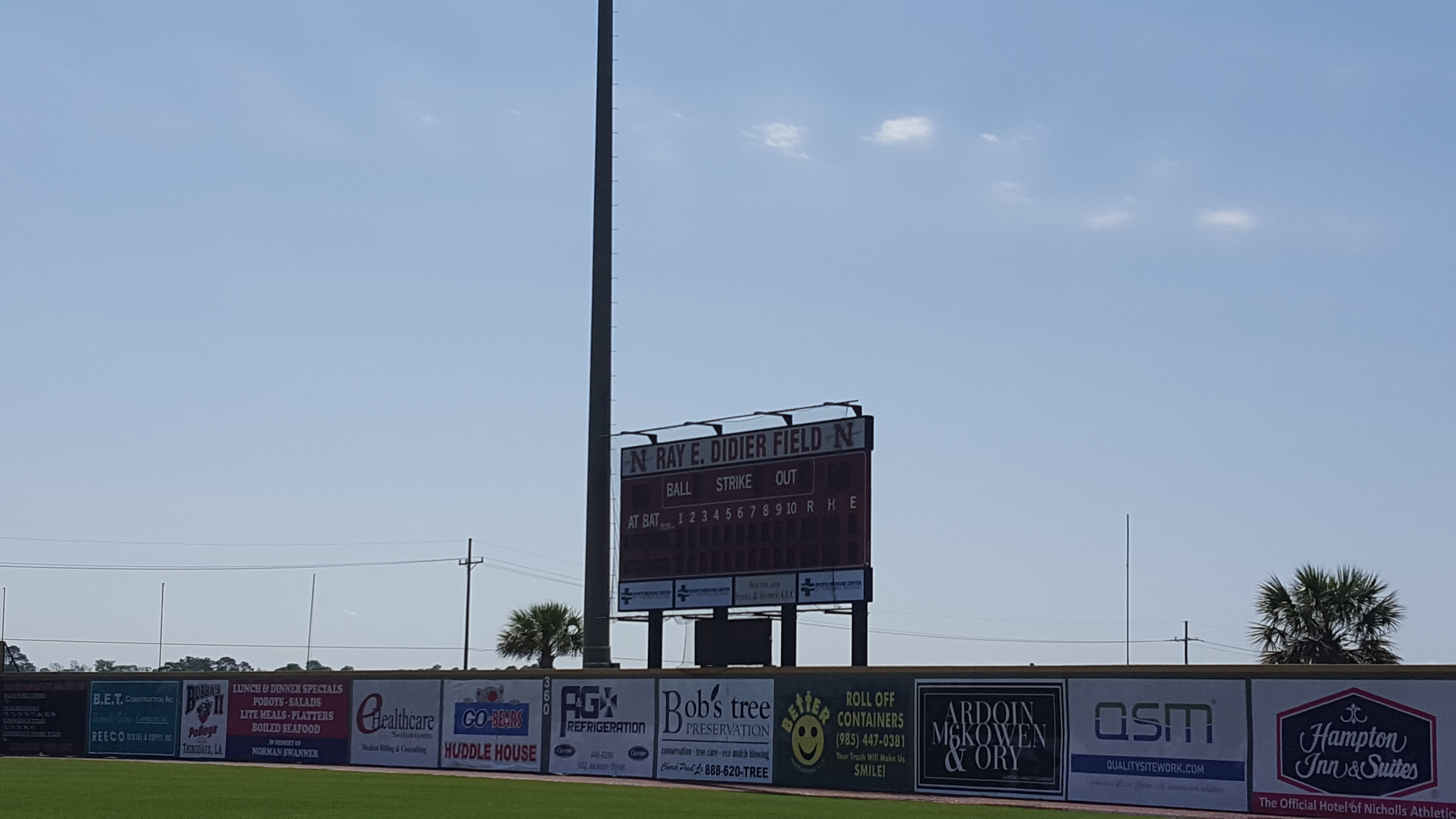
Ben Meyer Diamond at Ray E. Didier Field Scoreboard

== See also ==
- Nicholls Colonels baseball
- Nicholls Colonels
- List of NCAA Division I baseball venues
