= Nicholls Colonels =

Intercollegiate sports teams of Nicholls State University

- University: Nicholls State University
- Nickname: Colonels
- NCAA: Division I (FCS)
- Conference: Southland Conference
- Athletic director: Jonathan Terrell
- Location: Thibodaux, Louisiana
- Varsity teams: 15
- Football stadium: Manning Field at John L. Guidry Stadium
- Basketball arena: Stopher Gymnasium
- Baseball stadium: Ben Meyer Diamond at Ray E. Didier Field
- Softball stadium: Swanner Field at Geo Surfaces Park
- Soccer stadium: Thibodaux Regional Sports Complex
- Other venues: LaTour Golf Club; Nicholls Farm
- Colors: Red and gray
- Mascot: Colonel Tillou
- Fight song: Nicholls State Colonels Fight Song
- Website: geauxcolonels.com

The Nicholls Colonels are the 15 teams representing Nicholls State University, a university in Louisiana, in intercollegiate athletics. The Colonels compete in the NCAA Division I and the Colonels football team competes in the NCAA Division I Football Championship Subdivision (FCS). The Colonels sports teams are members of the Southland Conference.

== Nickname ==
The Nicholls State University official team nickname is the "Colonels". The nickname was chosen because the university was once a ROTC dominated school and the highest rank in ROTC is a Colonel.

== History ==
=== Conference affiliations ===
Years	Conference	Classification
1958–1965	Independent	NCAA College Division
1965–1971	Gulf States Conference	NCAA College Division
1971–1973	Gulf South Conference	NCAA College Division
1973–1979	Gulf South Conference	NCAA Division II
1979–1980	Independent	NCAA Division II
1980–1984 *(1982–1984)	Independent (Trans America Athletic Conference)	NCAA Division I
1984–1987	Gulf Star Conference	NCAA Division I
1987–1991	Independent	NCAA Division I
1991–present	Southland Conference	NCAA Division I

* From 1982–84, Nicholls (then athletically branded as "Nicholls State") was a provisional member of the Trans America Athletic Conference (TAAC).

- Men's sports – Only baseball played TAAC conference games

== Sports sponsored ==
Men's sports	Women's sports
Baseball	Basketball
Basketball	Beach volleyball
Cross country	Cross country
Football	Soccer
Golf	Softball
Tennis	Tennis
	Track and field^{†}
	Volleyball
† – Track and field includes both indoor and outdoor.

=== Baseball ===
The team is the varsity intercollegiate baseball team of Nicholls State University in Thibodaux, Louisiana, United States. The team is a member of the Southland Conference, which is part of the NCAA Division I. Nicholls' first baseball team was fielded in 1960. The team plays its home games at 2,100-seat Ben Meyer Diamond at Ray E. Didier Field and are coached by Brent Haring.

=== Men's basketball ===
The team represents Nicholls State University in Thibodaux, Louisiana, United States. The school's team currently competes in the Southland Conference, which is part of the NCAA Division I. Nicholls' first men's basketball team was fielded during the 1958–59 season. The team plays its home games at 3,800-seat Stopher Gymnasium and are coached by Tevon Saddler.

=== Women's basketball ===
The team represents Nicholls State University in Thibodaux, Louisiana, United States. The school's team currently competes in the Southland Conference, which is part of the NCAA Division I. Nicholls' first women's basketball team was fielded during the 1974–75 season. The team plays its home games at 3,800-seat Stopher Gymnasium and are coached by Justin Payne.

=== Women's beach volleyball ===
The team represents Nicholls State University in Thibodaux, Louisiana, United States. Nicholls launched its beach volleyball program in the 2019 season (2018–19 school year), and played its first season as an independent. The Colonels now compete in the Southland Conference, which added beach volleyball as an official conference sport for the 2020 season. The team plays its home matches at the Thibodaux Regional Sports Complex and the team is coached by Jonea Rima.

=== Cross country ===
The program represents Nicholls State University in Thibodaux, Louisiana, United States. The program includes separate men's and women's cross country teams, both of which compete in the Southland Conference, which is part of the NCAA Division I. The teams host home meets at Nicholls Farm and are coached by Stefanie Slekis.

=== Football ===
The program is the intercollegiate American football team for Nicholls State University located in Thibodaux, Louisiana, United States. The team competes in the NCAA Division I Football Championship Subdivision (FCS) and are members of the Southland Conference. Nicholls' first football team was fielded in 1972. The team plays its home games at the 10,500 seat Manning Field at John L. Guidry Stadium in Thibodaux, Louisiana. The Colonels are coached by Tommy Rybacki.

=== Men's golf ===
The team represents Nicholls State University in Thibodaux, Louisiana, United States. The school's team currently competes in the Southland Conference, which is part of the NCAA Division I. The team plays their home tournaments at the LaTour Golf Club in Mathews, Louisiana and are led by head coach James Schilling.

=== Women's soccer ===
The women's team represents Nicholls State University in Thibodaux, Louisiana, United States. The school's team currently competes in the Southland Conference, which is part of the NCAA Division I. Nicholls' first soccer team was fielded in 1998. The team played its home games at the 1,000-seat Nicholls Soccer Complex through the 2021 season. The Colonels moved to the multi-purpose field at the Thibodaux Regional Sports Complex in 2022. The team is coached by Kristy Helmers.

=== Softball ===
The softball team participates in the Southland Conference. Nicholls first softball team was fielded in 1981. The team plays its home games at 500-seat Swanner Field at Geo Surfaces Park and are coached by Ron Frost.

=== Tennis ===
Men's and Women's tennis currently competes in the Southland Conference, which is part of the NCAA Division I. Both men's and women's teams play their home matches at the Thibodaux Regional Sports Complex starting in 2022 after previously playing at the Colonel Tennis Complex since 2008. The teams are coached by Greg Harkins.

=== Women's track and field ===
The women's track and field program includes women's indoor and outdoor track and field teams, both of which compete in the Southland Conference, which is part of the NCAA Division I. The teams use the multi-purpose field and track facility at the Thibodaux Regional Sports Complex and are coached by Stefanie Slekis.

=== Women's volleyball ===
The school's team currently competes in the Southland Conference, which is part of the NCAA Division I. Nicholls' first volleyball team was fielded in 1975. The team plays its home games at 3,800-seat Stopher Gymnasium and are coached by Jonea Rima.

== Former varsity sports ==
- Women's golf — Dropped in 2009 due to budget constraints
- Men's track and field (indoor and outdoor) — Dropped in 2004 and replaced by men's tennis

== Championships ==
=== Conference championships ===
Sport	Regular season titles	Tournament titles
Baseball	1974, 1976, 1985, 2023	1984, 1998, 2023, 2024
Men's basketball	1976, 1979, 1995, 1998, 2018, 2021	1995, 1998
Women's basketball	–	2018
Football (Note: Football achievements also include playoff appearances in 1986, 1996, 2005, 2017, 2018, 2019, 2023)	1975, 1984, 2005, 2018, 2019, 2023	–
Softball	1992, 1994, 1995, 1996, 2018	1996, 1997

== Athletic facilities ==
The following is a list of the athletic facilities for the Nicholls Colonels. It includes Nicholls' outdoor stadiums, indoor arenas, golf courses, running courses, and training and practice facilities.

=== Current venues ===
- Manning Field at John L. Guidry Stadium
  Manning Field at John L. Guidry Stadium is a 10,500-seat multi-purpose stadium in Thibodaux, Louisiana. It is home to the Nicholls Colonels football team of the Southland Conference in the Football Championship Subdivision (FCS). The stadium is named in honor of former state representative John L. Guidry who was instrumental in the establishment of Francis T. Nicholls Junior College. The playing surface is named Manning Field after the Manning family (Peyton, Eli, Cooper and Archie) because the family holds the annual Manning Passing Academy football camp at the facility. In 2021, Nicholls State University opened the Boucvalt Family Athletic Complex located at the south end-zone of John L. Guidry Stadium featuring upgraded locker and training rooms, field-level coach offices, and a 110-seat meeting room. The current playing surface is GeoGreen Replicated Grass. The stadium was officially dedicated on September 16, 1972.
- Boucvault Athletic Complex
  The Boucvault Athletic Complex is a 20,000-square-foot facility in the south end zone of Manning Field at John L. Guidry Stadium.
- Gaubert Oil Practice Facility at Shaw Sports Turf/Manning Field
  The Gaubert Oil Practice Facility at Shaw Sports Turf/Manning Field is a covered turf 100-yard turf field and also includes office and storage space. It is located directly behind the Boucvault Athletic Complex and Manning Field at John L. Guidry Stadium.
- Stopher Gymnasium
  Stopher Gymnasium is a 3,800-seat multi-purpose arena in Thibodaux, Louisiana. It is home to the Nicholls Colonels men's and women's basketball teams and women's volleyball team. It opened in 1970.
- Ben Meyer Diamond at Ray E. Didier Field
  Ben Meyer Diamond at Ray E. Didier Field is a baseball venue in Thibodaux, Louisiana. It is home to the Nicholls Colonels baseball team of the NCAA Division I in the Southland Conference. The venue has a capacity of 2,100.
- LaTour Golf Club
  The LaTour Golf Club located in Mathews, Louisiana, is the home golf course of the Nicholls Colonels men's golf team of the NCAA Division I in the Southland Conference. It is an 18-hole, 7,170 yard, 72 par course and includes an on-site practice facility.
- Nicholls Farm
  Nicholls Farm is the home course for the Nicholls Colonels cross country teams in Thibodaux, Louisiana. It is a 277-acre farm located three miles south of Nicholls’ campus.
- Nicholls Golf Range
  The Nicholls Golf Range is the driving range complex located on the campus of Nicholls State University in Thibodaux, Louisiana. It is a practice venue for the Nicholls Colonels men's golf team of the NCAA Division I in the Southland Conference.
- Swanner Field at Geo Surfaces Park
  Swanner Field at Geo Surfaces Park is a softball venue in Thibodaux, Louisiana. It is home to the Nicholls Colonels softball team of the NCAA Division I in the Southland Conference. The venue has a capacity of 500.
- Thibodaux Regional Sports Complex
  The Thibodaux Regional Sports Complex is a 12-acre sports complex located between Nicholls State University and the Thibodaux Regional Wellness Center opening in 2022. The complex offers multiple sports facilities such as a beach volleyball courts, a multi-purpose field and track and tennis courts that meet NCAA national championship-level requirements and is home to Nicholls State University athletics sports teams.

- Thibodaux Regional Sports Complex beach volleyball courts

The beach volleyball courts offer twelve courts using Olympic-quality sand. It became home to the Nicholls Colonels women's beach volleyball team in March 2023.

- Thibodaux Regional Sports Complex multi-purpose field and track

The multi-purpose field and track offers facilities for track and field, soccer and football. The multi-purpose field is home to the Nicholls Colonels women's soccer team playing their first match at the facility in August 2022. The eight-lane track became home to the Nicholls Colonels women's track and field team in Spring 2023.

- Thibodaux Regional Sports Complex tennis courts

The tennis courts offer twelve courts with a viewing grandstand. It became home to the Nicholls Colonels men's and women's tennis teams in January 2023.

- Frank L. Barker Athletic Building
  The Frank L. Barker Athletic Building or Barker Hall is the athletic administration building for Nicholls State University athletics. It also formerly housed the Nicholls Colonels football operations center and baseball fieldhouse.
- Leonard C. Chabert Strength and Conditioning Facility
  The Nicholls Colonels strength and conditioning facility is located inside the Leonard C. Chabert Strength and Conditioning Facility or Leonard C. Chabert Hall. It includes the weight room and nutrition center for Nicholls athletics.

=== Former venues ===
- Atchafalaya Golf Course at Idlewild — Men's golf (2015–2018)
- Colonel Tennis Complex — Men's and women's tennis (2008–2022)
- Nicholls Soccer Complex — Women's soccer (1998–2021)
- Nicholls State Colonels football practice fields — Football (1972–2023)
- Shaver Gymnasium — Men's basketball (1958–1969)

=== Gallery ===
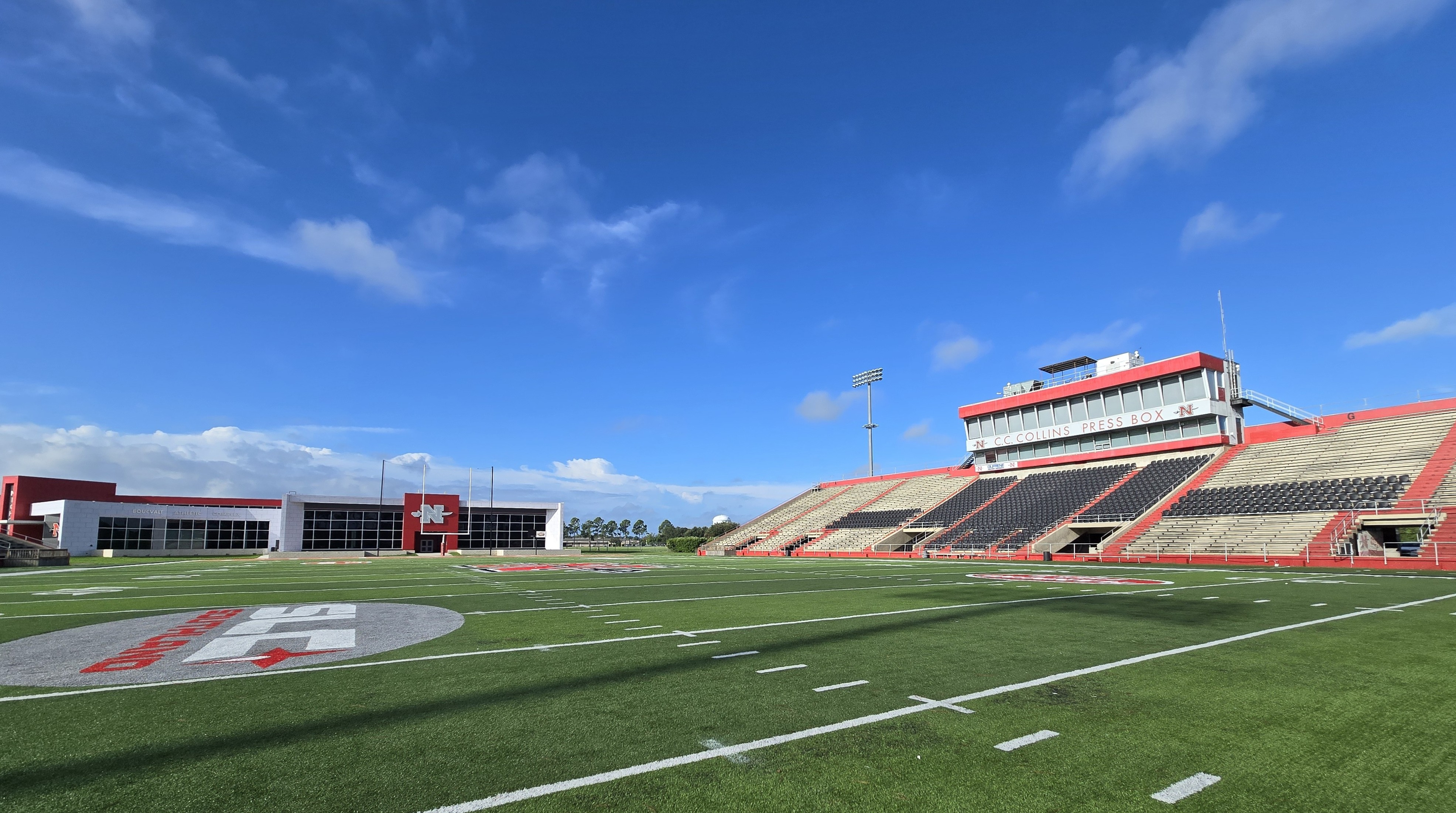
Manning Field at John L. Guidry Stadium (football)

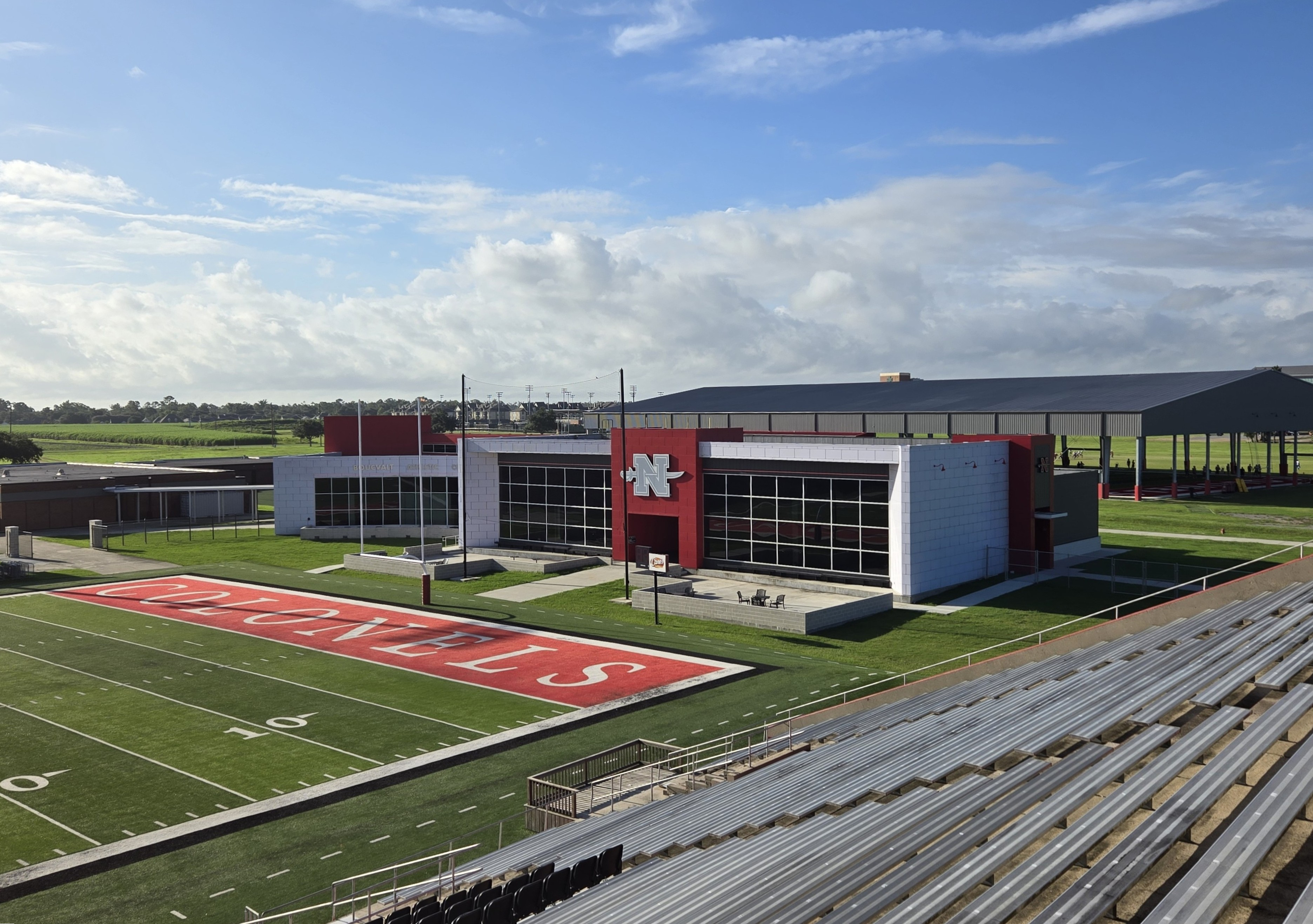
Boucvault Athletic Complex and Gaubert Oil Practice Facility at Shaw Sports Turf/Manning Field (football)

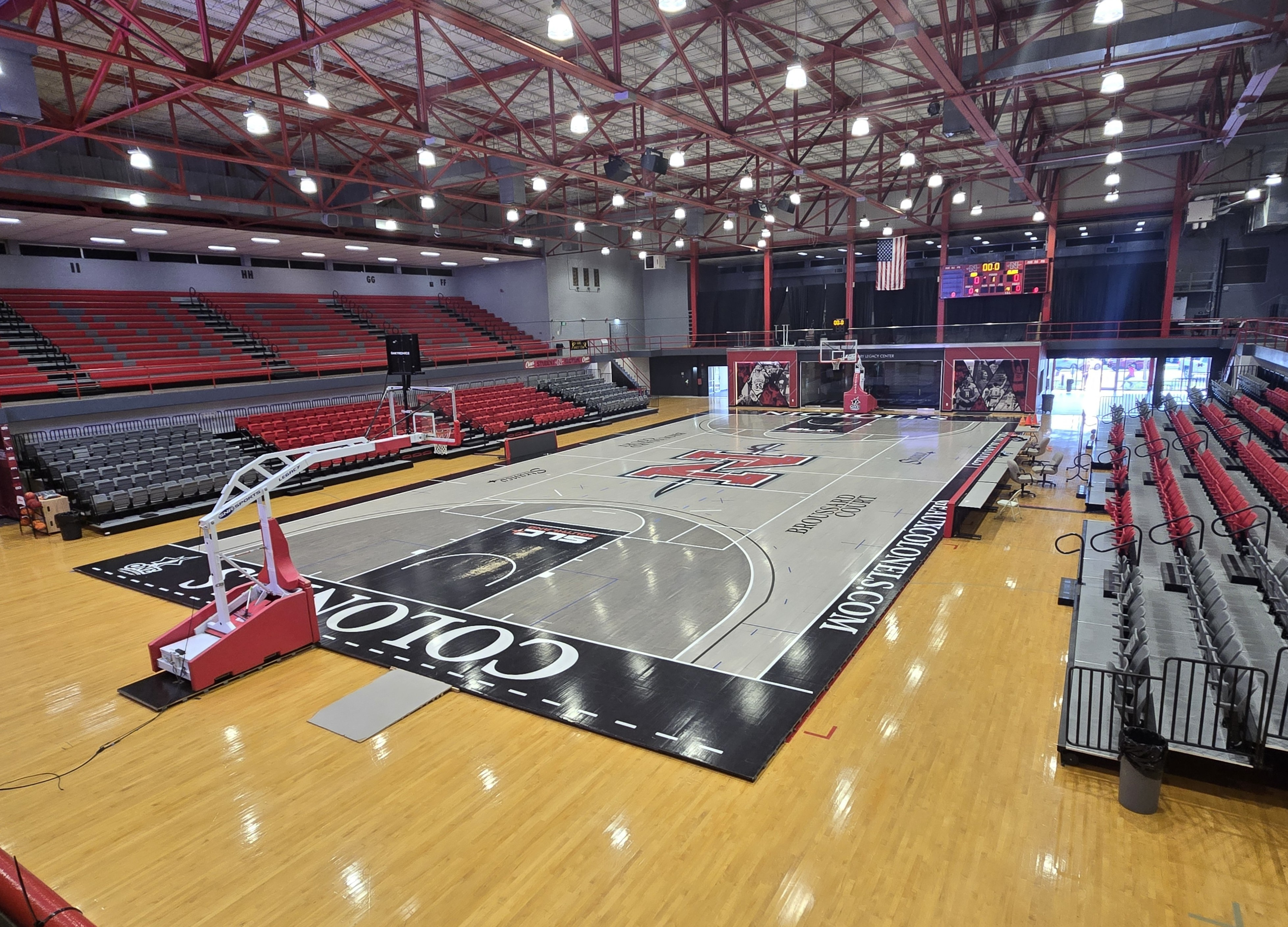
Stopher Gymnasium (basketball, volleyball)

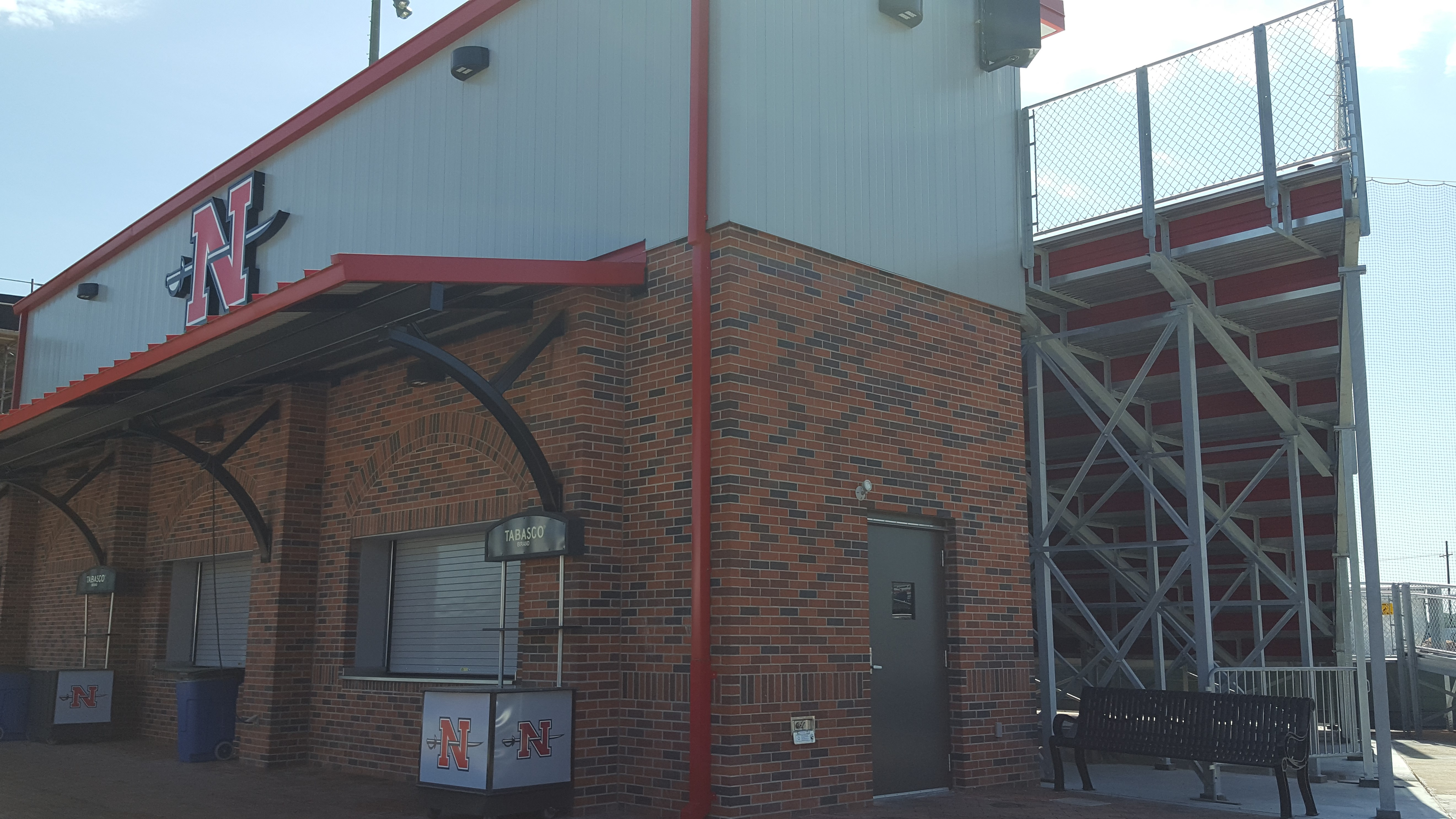
Ben Meyer Diamond at Ray E. Didier Field (baseball)

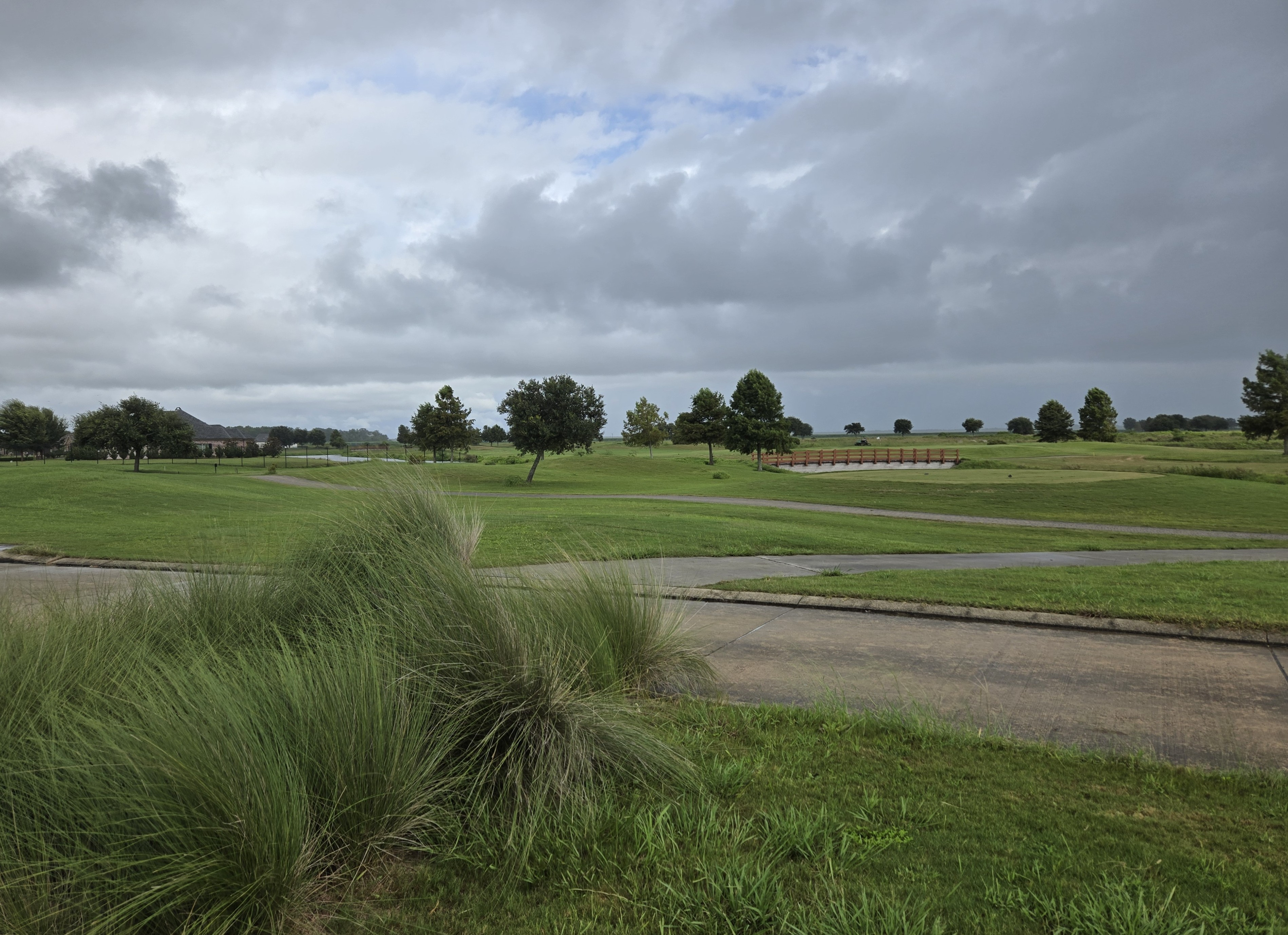
LaTour Golf Club (golf)

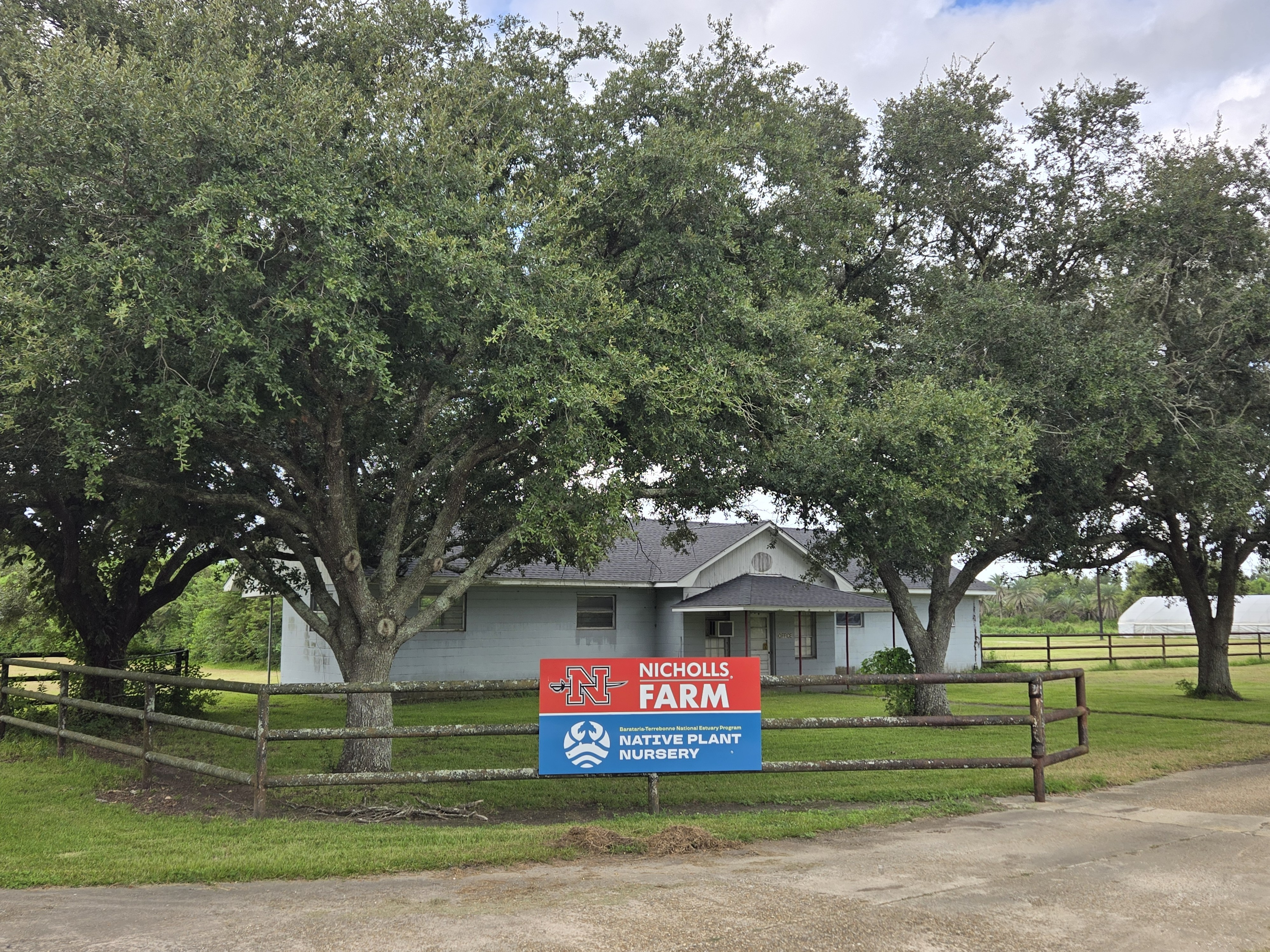
Nicholls Farm (cross country)

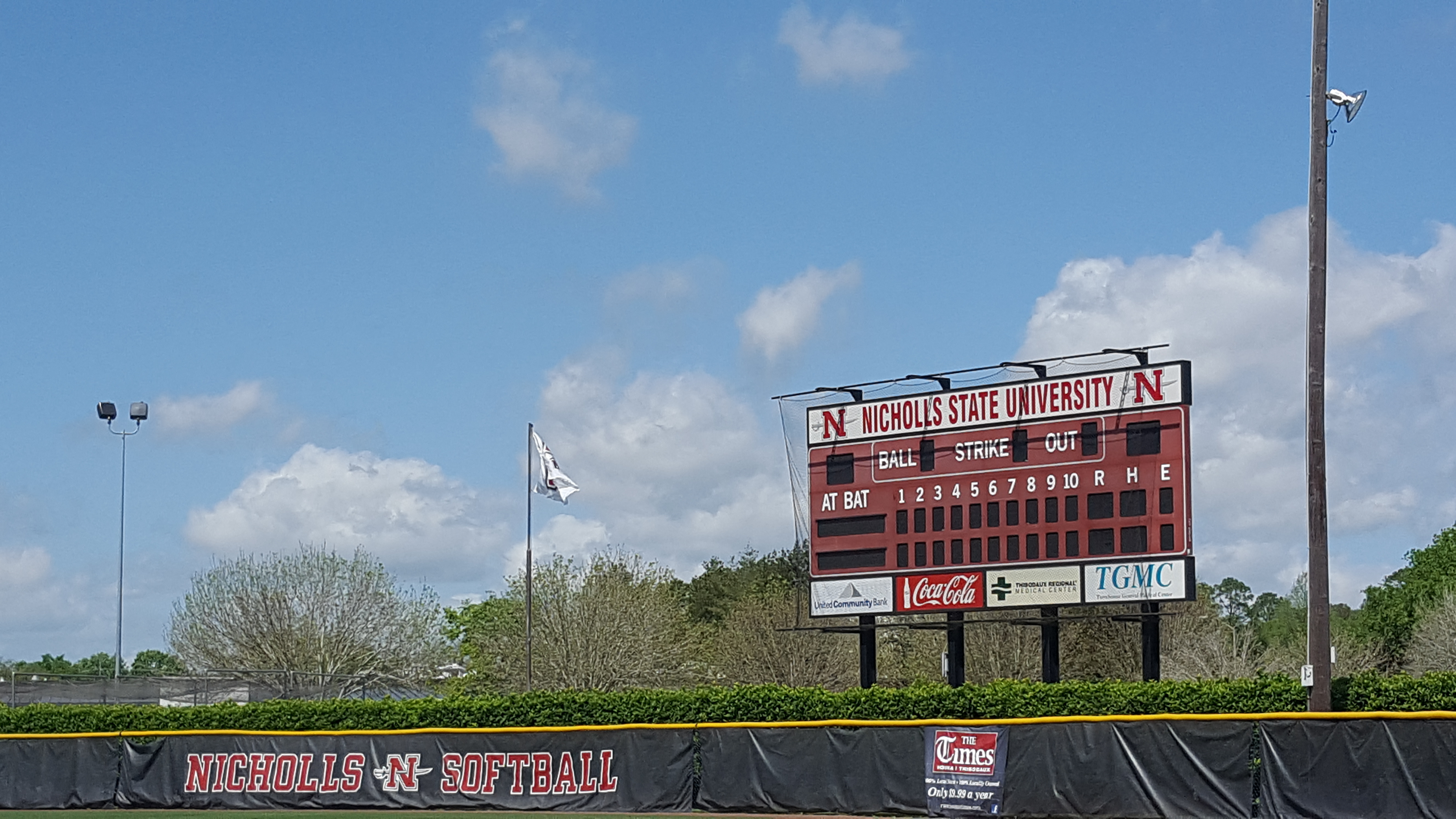
Swanner Field at Geo Surfaces Park (softball)

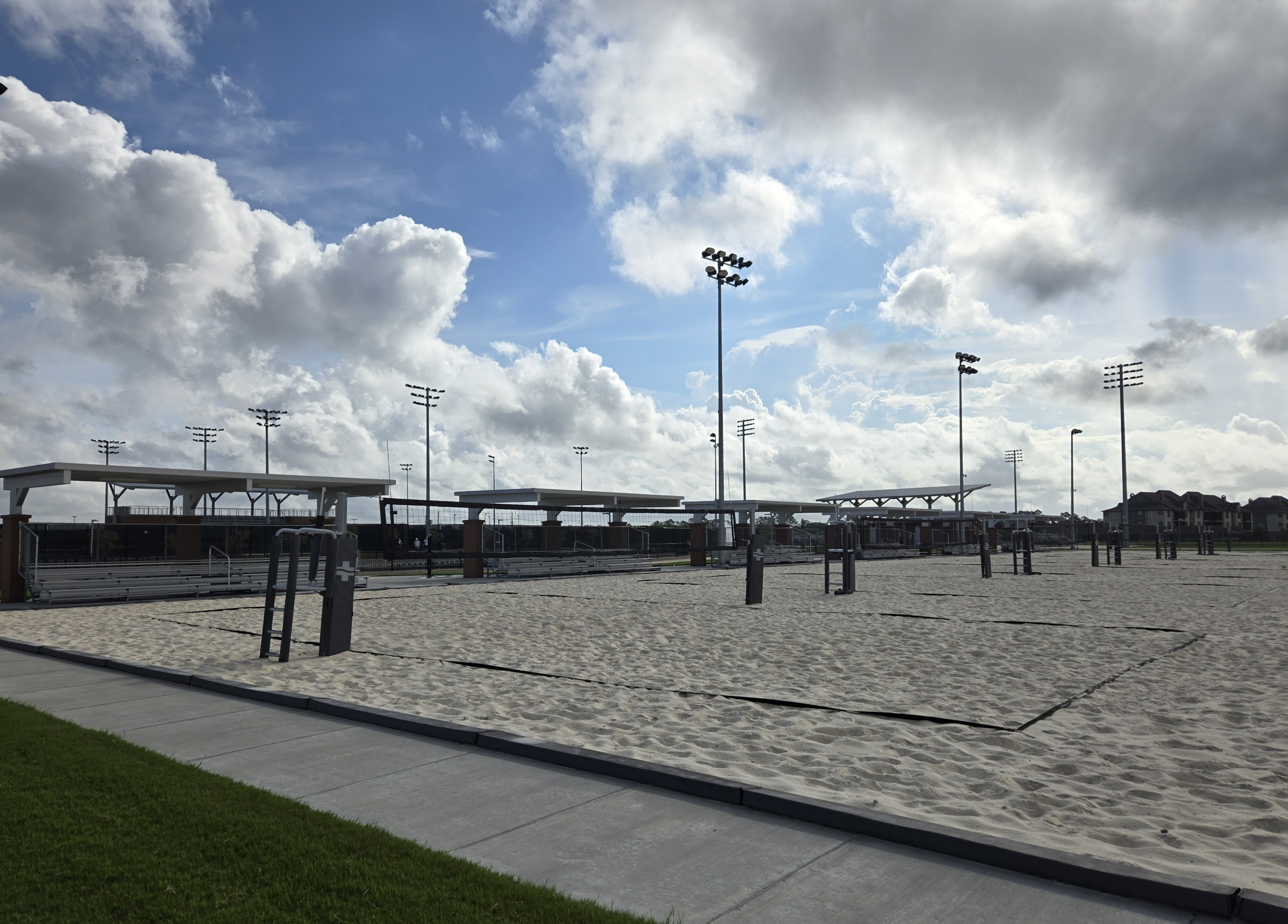
Thibodaux Regional Sports Complex beach volleyball courts (beach volleyball)

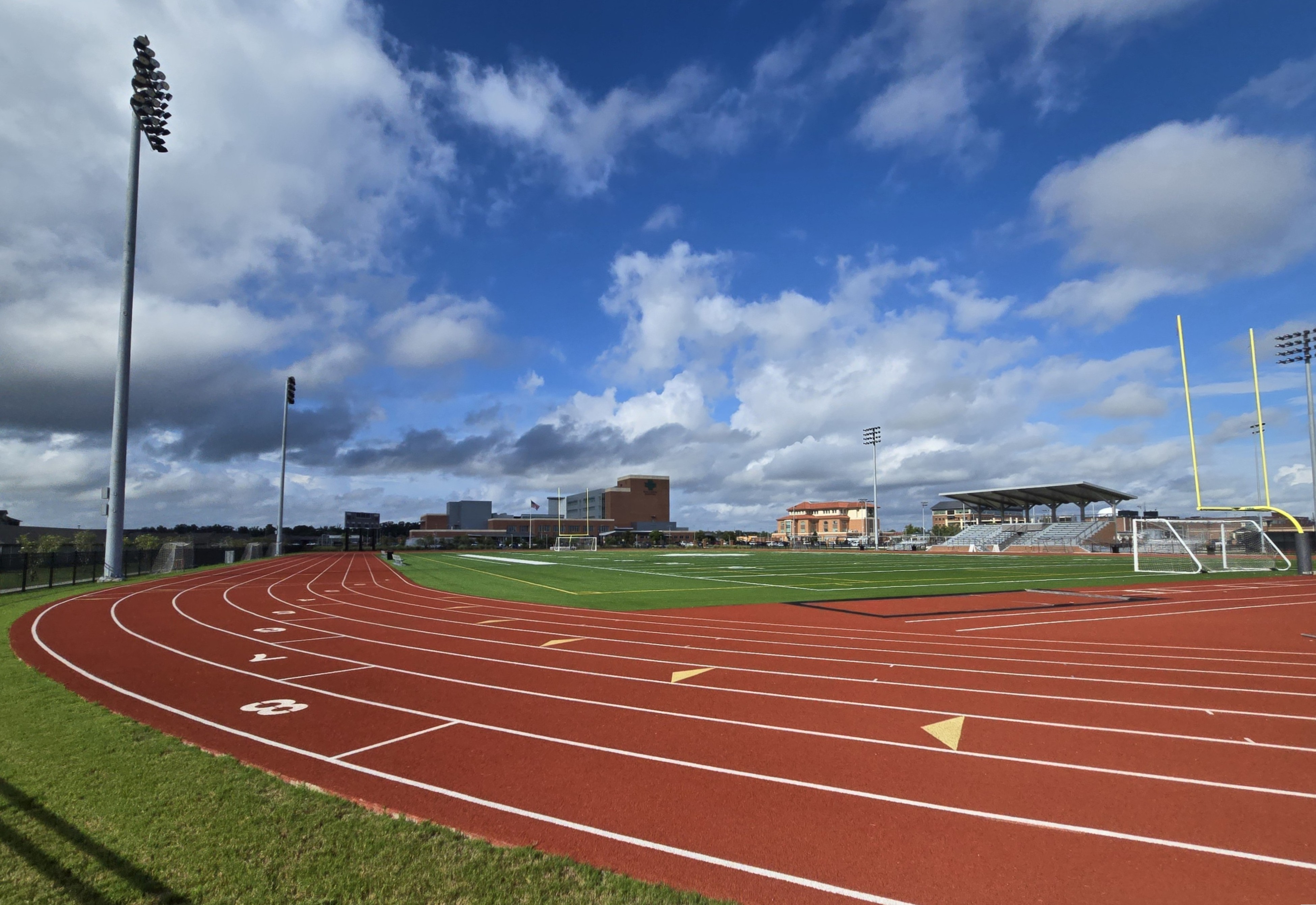
Thibodaux Regional Sports Complex multi-purpose field and track (soccer and track & field)

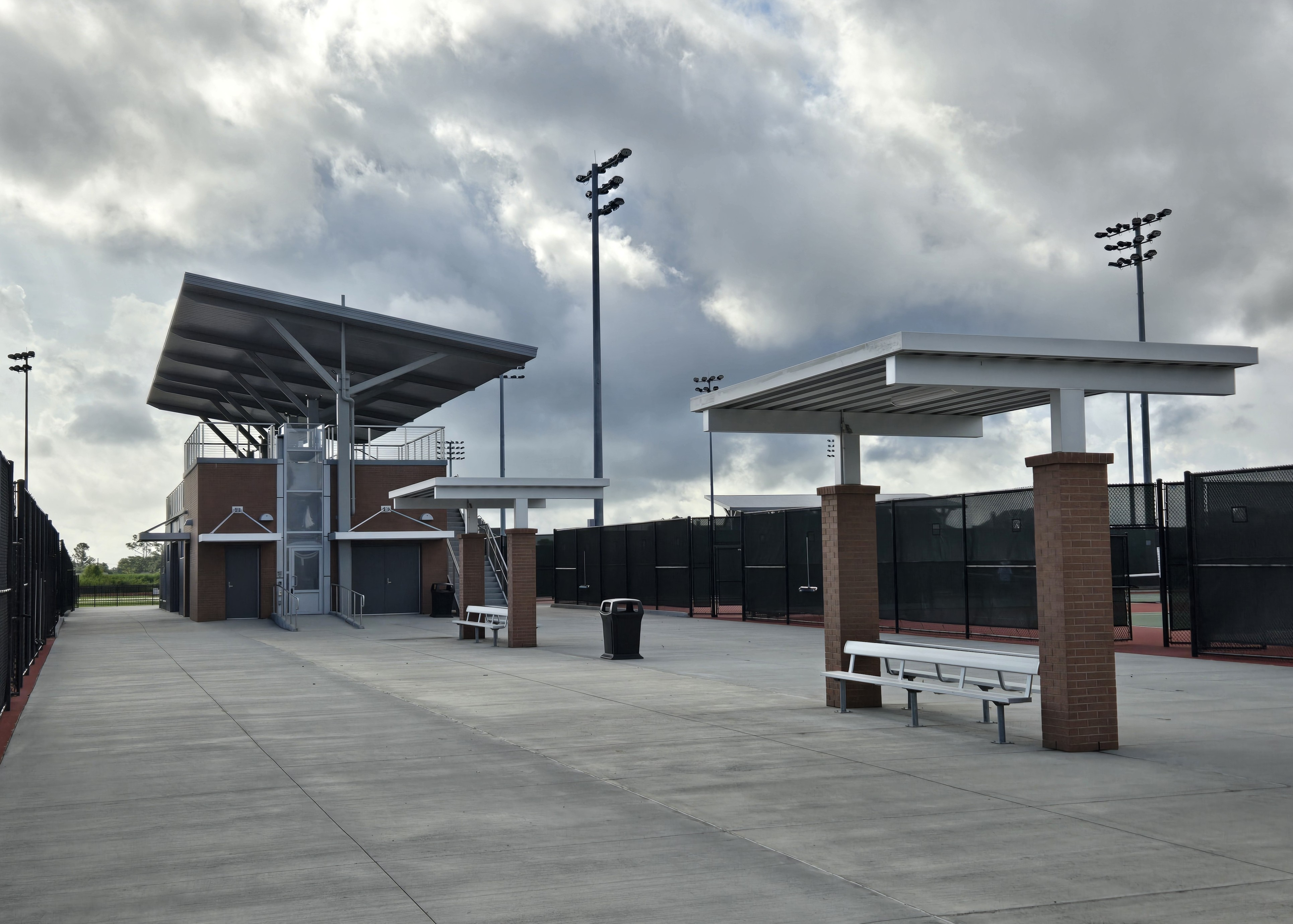
Thibodaux Regional Sports Complex tennis courts (tennis)

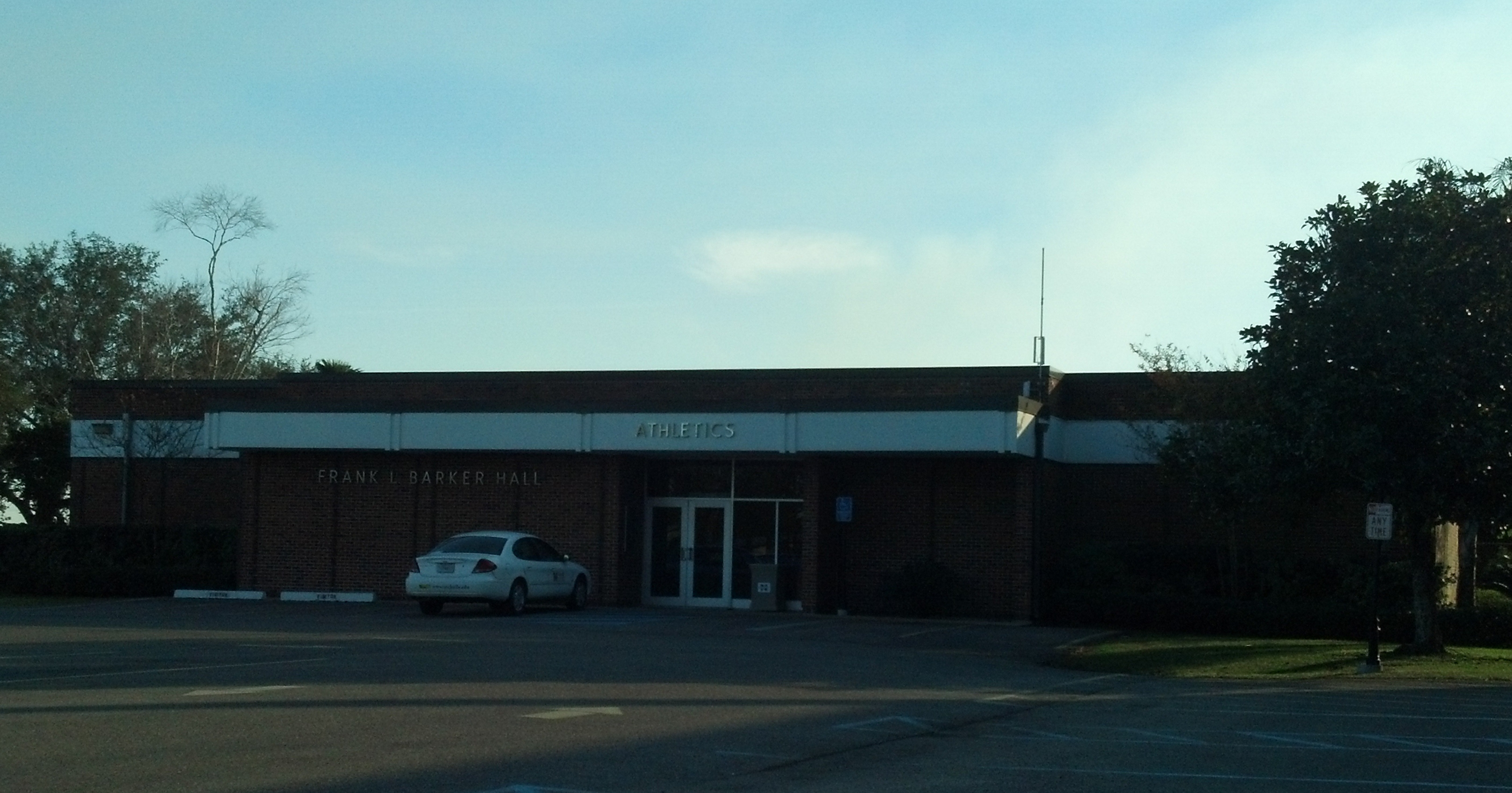
Frank L. Barker Athletic Building (athletic administration)

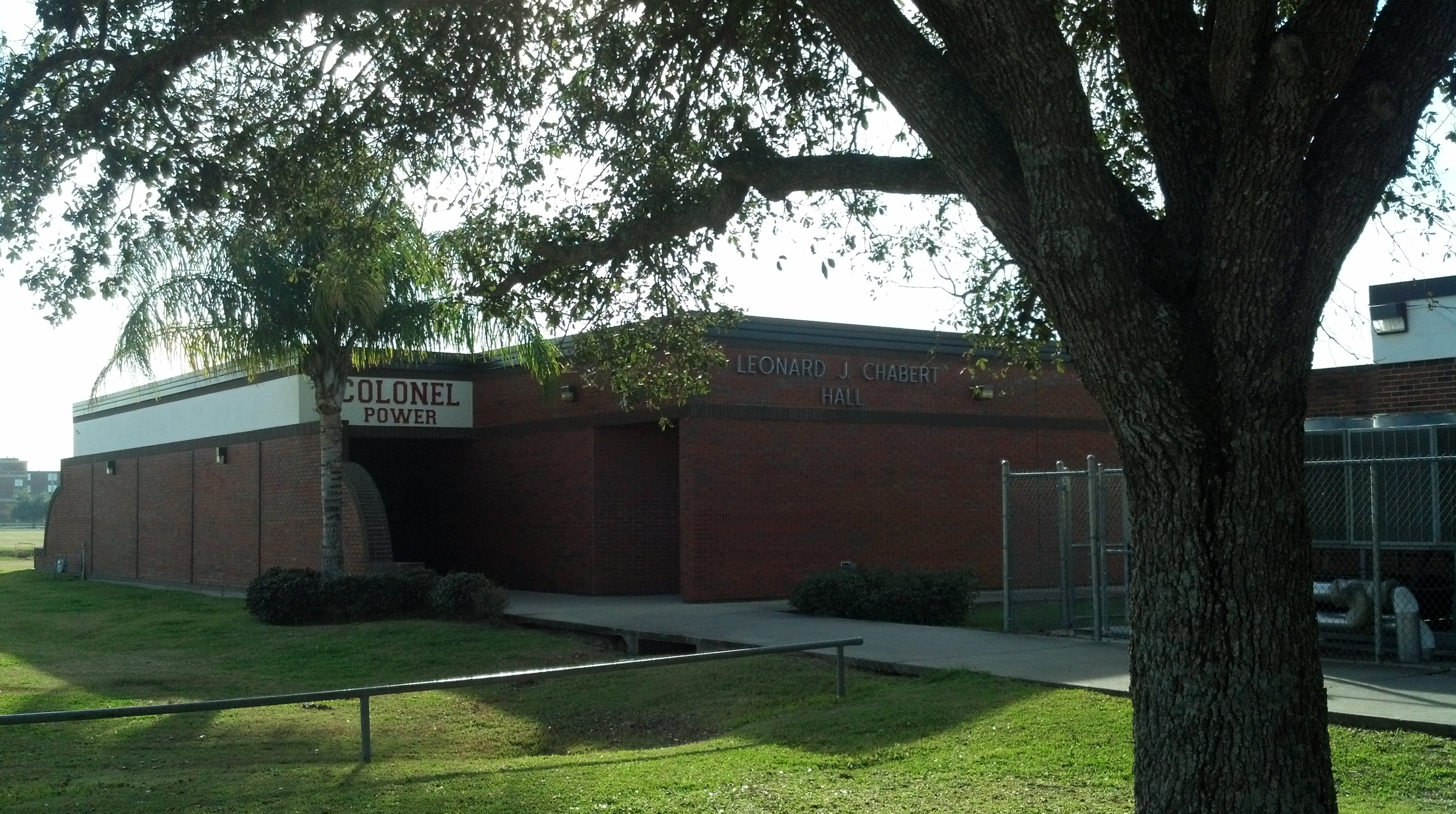
Leonard C. Chabert Strength and Conditioning Facility

== Nicholls Colonels traditions ==
=== Nicholls State University Alma Mater ===
The name of the "official" Alma Mater for Nicholls State University is "Nicholls State University Alma Mater."

=== Nicholls Colonels Fight Song ===
The name of the "official" fight song for Nicholls State University is "Nicholls Colonels Fight Song."

=== Pride of Nicholls Marching Band ===
The "Pride of Nicholls" Marching Band is the marching band which represents Nicholls State University in Thibodaux, Louisiana.

=== Colonel Tillou ===
"Colonel Tillou" is the official athletics mascot for Nicholls State University. The modern version of Col. Tillou wears a bright red uniform topped off with a contemporary-style military officer's cap.

=== Nicholls School Colors ===
The "official" school colors for Nicholls are red and gray.

=== Nicholls Colonelettes and Colorguard ===
The Nicholls Colonelettes are the Nicholls dance team. This group performs at all home football games, one away football game, and all home basketball games. They participate in all pep rallies.

The Nicholls Colorguard performs at all home football games.

=== Nicholls Cheerleaders ===
The Nicholls Cheerleaders are the co-ed cheerleading squad for the Nicholls Colonels. The cheerleaders perform at football games, basketball games and pep rallies in addition to a number of public relations and charitable events each year.

== Rivalries ==
The Nicholls sports teams maintain a conference rivalry with the Southeastern Louisiana sports teams, but the main rivalry is in football where the teams compete in the annual River Bell Classic. The Nicholls sports teams also compete against conference rival Northwestern State and in football the teams play in the annual NSU Challenge.

In football, Nicholls has a rivalry dating back to 1998 with the Texas State Bobcats. They compete irregularly for the Battle for the Paddle trophy.

== Nicholls State University Athletics Hall of Fame ==
The purpose of the Nicholls State University Athletics Hall of Fame is to strengthen and perpetuate athletic tradition at the university. Members in the Athletics Hall of Fame shall consist only of those outstanding persons whose dedication and performance merit the great honors that the University can bestow.

The Hall of Fame is located on the campus of Nicholls State University in the Frank L. Barker Athletic Building.

== Colonel Athletic Association ==
The Colonel Athletic Association is the fundraising organization for the Nicholls State University athletics department. The athletic association helps to provide support to Nicholls' student-athletes and also focuses on fundraising activities for facility enhancements and operating expenses.

== Athletic directors ==
Director	Years served
Morris Osburn	1958–1960
James Hall	1960–1963
Raymond Didier	1963–1978
Don Landry	1978–1987
Phil Greco	1987–1993
Mike Knight	1993–1998
Stan Williamson	1998–2000
Rob Bernardi	2000–2016
Matt Roan	2016–2020
Jonathan Terrell	2020–present

# denotes interim athletic director

== Broadcast information ==
=== Nicholls Colonels Radio Network ===
The Nicholls Colonels Radio Network is the radio network of the Nicholls Colonels men's and women's sports teams. It consists of several radio stations throughout the state of Louisiana.

The list of participating stations are:

- KLRZ 100.3 FM in Larose, Louisiana (flagship)
- KLEB 1600 AM in Golden Meadow, Louisiana
- KNSU 91.5 FM in Thibodaux, Louisiana

=== Streaming services ===
Nicholls Colonels games can be streamed online for free at Colonels All-Access. It is a video subscription service available through the Nicholls athletics department where viewers can watch a live stream of all non-televised home football, men’s and women’s basketball, baseball and volleyball events.

== See also ==
- List of NCAA Division I institutions
