= Nicholls Colonels women's basketball =

American college basketball team

2026–27 Nicholls Colonels women's basketball team
- University: Nicholls State University
- Head coach: Jalyn Johnson-Joubert (1st season)
- Location: Thibodaux, Louisiana
- Arena: Stopher Gymnasium (capacity: 3,800)
- Conference: Southland
- Nickname: Colonels
- Colors: Red and gray

NCAA Division I tournament appearances
- 2018

Conference tournament champions
- 2018

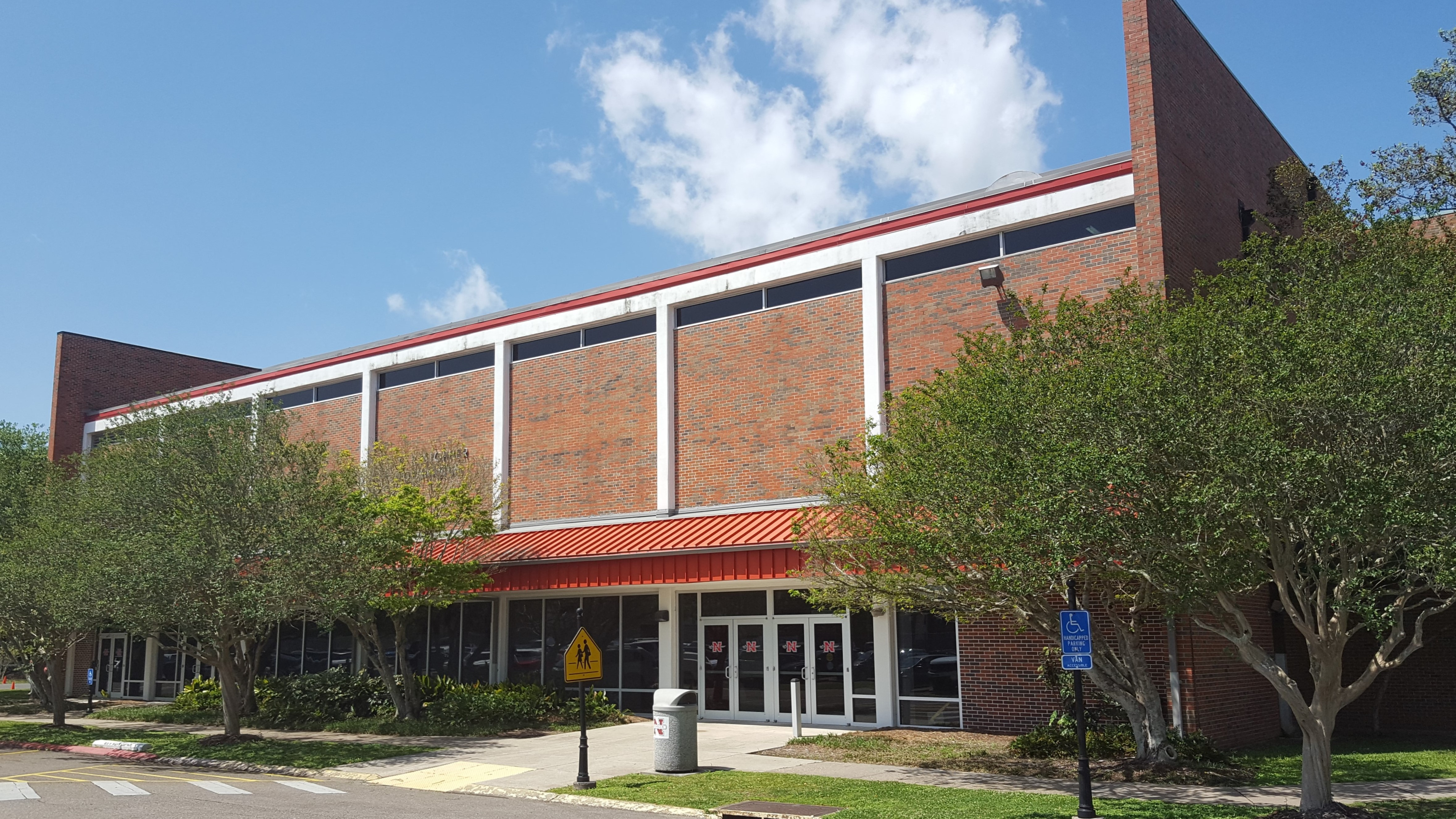
Stopher Gym

The Nicholls Colonels women's basketball team represents Nicholls State University in Thibodaux, Louisiana, United States. The school's team currently competes in the Southland Conference, which is part of the National Collegiate Athletic Association's Division I. Nicholls' first women's basketball team was fielded in 1974–1975. The team plays its home games at 3,800-seat Stopher Gymnasium and are coached by Jalyn Johnson-Joubert.

== Roster ==
2023–24 Nicholls Colonels women's basketball team
Players
Coaches

Pos.	#	Name	Height	Year	Hometown
G	0	Amelia Sandie	5 ft 7 in (1.7 m)	RS Jr	Brighton, England
G	1	Mikayla Etienne	—	Sr	Monroe, Louisiana
G	2	Marypaz Martinez	—	Fr	Tres Rios, Costa Rica
G	3	Ashley Malone	5 ft 7 in (1.7 m)	Sr	Nashville, Tennessee
G	5	Traya Bruce	5 ft 7 in (1.7 m)	RS Sr	Cut Off, Louisiana
G	7	Betzalys Delgado	—	Fr	Arecibo, Puerto Rico
F	10	Victoria Woods	6 ft 2 in (1.88 m)	Jr	Elton, Louisiana
G	11	Britiya Curtis	—	Fr	Calhoun, Georgia
G	12	Kyla Hamilton	5 ft 6 in (1.68 m)	Sr	Westlake, Louisiana
G	14	Adrian Mann	5 ft 8 in (1.73 m)	RS Jr	Mokane, Missouri
F	20	Adyson James	5 ft 8 in (1.73 m)	Fr	San Antonio, Texas
F	21	Lexi Alexander	6 ft 0 in (1.83 m)	So	Round Rock, Texas
G/F	22	Deonna Brister	5 ft 11 in (1.8 m)	Jr	Lake Arthur, Louisiana
F	23	Daelyn Craig	6 ft 0 in (1.83 m)	Jr	Lithonia, Georgia
G	24	Malaysia DePrisco	5 ft 9 in (1.75 m)	So	Austin, Texas
G	25	Violet Skipworth	5 ft 11 in (1.8 m)	Jr	Pace, Florida
C	30	Kate Manley	6 ft 4 in (1.93 m)	Sr	Roswell, Georgia
F	35	Khia Lee	5 ft 10 in (1.78 m)	Jr	Manchester England

Head coach

- Justine Payne (Nicholls State)

Assistant coach(es)

- Nicholas Graham
- Tykeria Williams
- Jada Terry

Legend

- (C) Team captain
- (S) Suspended
- (I) Ineligible
- (W) Walk-on
- Injured
- Current redshirt

Roster
Last update: October 26, 2023

== Championships ==
=== Conference championships ===
Tournament

- Southland: 2018

== History ==
=== NCAA tournament ===
Nicholls State has appeared in the NCAA Women's Division I Basketball Tournament once. The Colonels have a 0–1 record.

Year	Seed	Round	Opponent	Result
2018	#16	First Round	#1 Mississippi State	L 50–95

== See also ==
- Nicholls Colonels
