= KNSU (FM) =

- Thibodaux, Louisiana; United States
- Frequency: 91.5 MHz
- Branding: "91.5 FM KNSU"

Programming
- Format: Alternative rock with some other formats depending upon program

Ownership
- Owner: Nicholls State University

History
- Former call signs: KVFG (until 1985)
- Call sign meaning: NSU (Nicholls State University)

Technical information
- Licensing authority: FCC
- Facility ID: 48825
- Class: A
- ERP: 250 watts
- HAAT: 45 meters (148 ft)
- Transmitter coordinates: 29°47′29″N 90°48′07″W

Links
- Public license information: Public file; LMS
- Website: KNSU Website

KNSU (91.5 FM) is a campus radio station licensed to Nicholls State University in Thibodaux, Louisiana. The station mainly programs alternative rock aimed at a college aged crowd, however the station also plays hip hop music on shows aired on the station. The station also broadcasts Nicholls Colonels athletic events. It is part of the Colonel Media Group, the overarching organization for NSU student media.

== History ==
KNSU was originally licensed as KVFG-FM, going on air February 19, 1972. Previously, the station could only be heard via speakers in the Nicholls student union.

It was the third college radio station to launch in Louisiana after Tulane University's WTUL and WLDC(AM) at Loyola University New Orleans, narrowly beating WWNO at Louisiana State University in New Orleans to the airwaves by one day. The "VFG" in KVFG stood for President Vernon F. Galliano, and the station broadcast with those call letters until January 1985, when the FCC reassigned the call letters KNSU from the Coast Guard to KVFG.

The station began as a 10 watt station broadcasting on 91.5 FM which allowed for only on-campus and surrounding neighborhood area coverage. In 1992, the station was granted a construction permit to increase its effective radiated power; this change increased coverage to the surrounding regional area and the station was licensed in 1996 as a higher-powered 250 watt ERP and 45 meters of tower height station.

In the summer of 1973, KVFG aired the Watergate hearings with simultaneous French-language interpretation. NSU chemistry professor Pierre Rathle handled most of the live interpretation.

In 2019, Nicholls State announced plans for a new student media center, which would house studios for KNSU alongside the university's other student-run print and television media operations. The Media Convergence Center opened in 2021.
