= Lamar Lady Cardinals soccer =

American college soccer team

- Founded: 2007; 19 years ago
- University: Lamar University
- Athletic director: Jeff O'Malley
- Head coach: Nathan Kogut (3rd season)
- Conference: Southland
- Location: Beaumont, Texas
- Stadium: Lamar Soccer Complex (capacity: 500)
- Nickname: Lady Cardinals
- Colors: Red and white
Home	Away

NCAA Tournament appearances
- 2017, 2019, 2022, 2023

Conference Tournament championships
- 2017, 2019, 2022, 2023

Conference Regular Season championships
- 2017, 2019, 2022, 2023

The Lamar Lady Cardinals soccer team represents Lamar University in NCAA Division I college soccer. The team, currently led by head coach Nathan Kogut, competes in the Southland Conference. The team's initial season was 2007. The Lady Cardinals' home stadium is the Lamar Soccer Complex located on the university's campus. The team began playing home games there starting with the 2009 season. The Lady Cardinals home stadium for the first two seasons was Cardinal Stadium now named Provost Umphrey Stadium.

== History ==
Lamar University first sponsored soccer in 2007. The team has had five head coaches since its beginning.

- P. Matthew "Mat" Dillon, the first head coach, led the Lady Cardinals in their initial season, 2007.
- Dewi Hardman served as head coach from 2008 to 2011. Under Hardman, the Lady Cardinals improved from eighth place in 2008 to a third place conference finish and second conference tournament appearance in 2011.
- Orlando Cervantes led the Lady Cardinals from 2012 to 2015. The team finished 2012 with a second-place finish in conference and runner-up in the conference tournament.
- Steve Holeman was head coach for six seasons (2016-2021). While at Lamar, Holeman completed his second season with the Lady Cardinals in 2017 with three firsts for the team. The Lady Cardinals won the Southland Conference regular season championship, the Southland Conference tournament championship, and participated in the NCAA Division I Women's Soccer Tournament for the first time in program history. The Lady Cardinals lost their first NCAA Division I tournament match 0–1 in an on goal play. In 2019, the Lady Cardinals repeated winning the Southland Conference regular season championship, the Southland Conference tournament, and participated in the NCAA tournament losing to 14th ranked UCLA 1–4. Holeman was named Southland Conference women's soccer coach of the year in 2017 and 2019.
- Nathan Kogut, was named head coach on April 20, 2022, replacing Steve Holeman who resigned in February, 2022 to become head coach for the Texas State team. Kogut was named Southland Conference coach of the year in 2022. He was named Southland Conference coach of the year again in 2023. In Kogut's first year with the Cardinals, the Lady Cardinals won the Southland Conference regular season and the 2022 Southland Conference women's soccer tournament championship. They returned to the NCAA Division I women's soccer tournament for the third time losing to LSU 1–3. In Kogut's second year with the Cardinals, the Lady Cardinals won the Southland Conference regular season, and repeated as 2023 SLC tournament champions, the first back to back tournament championship in Southland Conference women's soccer tournament history. The team earned the conference automatic bid to the 2023 NCAA Division I women's soccer tournament losing to 5th seeded Texas Longhorns 0–2 in Austin, Texas.

== Players ==
=== Current roster ===
as of 2024 as of August 2, 2024

Note: Flags indicate national team as defined under FIFA eligibility rules; some limited exceptions apply. Players may hold more than one non-FIFA nationality.

No.	Pos.	Nation	Player
0	GK	USA	Taylor Howard
1	GK	USA	Maddie Rich
2	DF/FW	USA	Acacia Weis
3	MF/FW	USA	Mariana Cardenas
4	DF/FW	USA	Annika Kassenbrock
5	DF	USA	Reagan Adair
6	MF	USA	Kaitlyn Niemeyer
7	MF/FW	USA	Alana Clark
8	DF	USA	Kaya Williams
9	FW	USA	Isela Ramirez
10	MF	USA	Mia Ferrell
11	FW	USA	Aaliyah Pena
12	MF	USA	Trinity Clark
13	MF	USA	Viviana Duarte
14	DF	USA	Elena Carmody
15	MF/FW	USA	Payton Joost
16	DW	USA	Olivia Smith
17	DF	USA	Ansley Beer

No.	Pos.	Nation	Player
18	FW	USA	Arely Alaniz
19	FW	GHA	Rafiatu Alhassan
20	DF	USA	Maria Poljak
21	FW	USA	Taylor Conway
22	MF	USA	Kacey Beer
23	FW/DF	USA	Anneliese Switzer
24	DF	USA	Lauryn Woodard
25	MF	USA	Erin Dull
26	DF	USA	Ayvah Angala
28	DF	USA	Riley Wilson
30	GK	USA	Jaliyah Clark
31	DF	USA	Reese Carmody
32	DF/FW	USA	Caragan Childs
34	DF	USA	Olivia Manibo
44	FW/MF	USA	Cena Carlson
88	FW	USA	Ronke Abudu
99	FW	USA	Kamryn Harvey

== Coaching staff ==
Position	Staff
Athletic director	(United States) Jeff O'Malley
Head coach	(United States) Nathan Kogut
Assistant coach	(United States) Kurt Albrecht
Assistant coach	(United States) Colton Bryant
Graduate Assistant Coach	(United States) Kelsey Brann

== Stadium ==
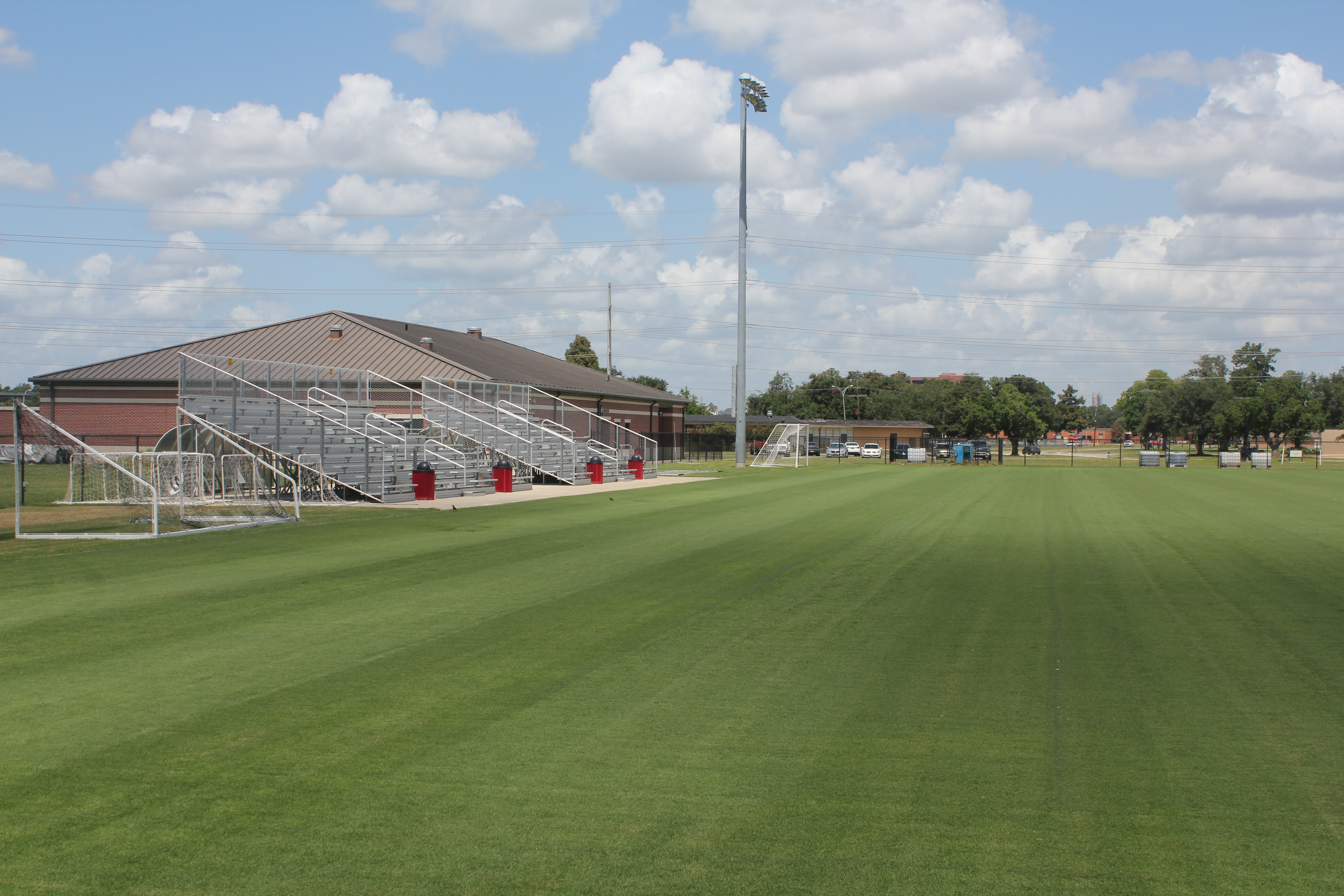
Lamar Soccer Complex, home venue

Construction on the Lamar Soccer Complex began in June, 2009. The first match at the stadium was against the New Mexico State Aggies on September 25, 2009. Approximate field dimensions are 115 yards x 70 yards. The stadium has permanent bleacher seating for 500. Covered benches are available for both teams. The stadium is equipped with lighting, an electronic score board, programmable irrigation, and a fertilization system.

The Lamar Soccer and Softball Complex building, approximately 10,000 sq ft in size, is located between the soccer stadium and the Lamar Softball Complex. It has locker rooms for home and visitors, training facilities, and coaches' offices for both sports. It also has ticketing and concessions. The 2014 and 2018 Southland Conference Women's Soccer Tournaments were held at the stadium.

Cardinal Stadium, now named Provost Umphrey Stadium following a major renovation, was the home field for the team's initial 2 seasons (2007 and 2008).

== NCAA Year-by-year results ==
Season	Conference	Coach	Overall				Conference				Notes
Season	Conference	Coach	Games	Win	Loss	Tie	Games	Win	Loss	Tie	Notes
NCAA Year-by-Year Results
2007	Southland	P. Matthew "Matt" Dillon	18	0	18	0	9	0	9	0	10th
2008	Southland	Dewi Hardman	16	4	11	1	9	2	6	1	8th
2009	Southland	Dewi Hardman	18	4	13	1	9	3	6	0	8th
2010	Southland	Dewi Hardman	19	5	11	3	10	3	5	2	6th, conference tournament appearance
2011	Southland	Dewi Hardman	19	9	8	2	10	6	3	1	3rd, conference tournament appearance
		Dewi Hardman	72	22	43	7	38	14	20	4	
2012	Southland	Orlando Cervantes	21	11	9	1	9	6	3	0	2nd, conference tournament runner-up
2013	Southland	Orlando Cervantes	19	7	10	2	10	3	6	1	10th
2014	Southland	Orlando Cervantes	18	5	11	2	11	3	6	2	8th
2015	Southland	Orlando Cervantes	20	8	11	1	11	4	6	1	7th
		Orlando Cervantes	78	31	41	6	41	16	21	4	
2016	Southland	Steve Holeman	19	2	14	3	11	1	7	3	12th
2017	Southland	Steve Holeman	23	18	4	1	11	10	1	0	1st, SLC regular season champions, SLC tournament champions, NCAA DI tournament appearance
2018	Southland	Steve Holeman	20	12	6	2	11	7	2	2	3rd, SLC tournament semi-finals
2019	Southland	Steve Holeman	23	16	7	0	11	10	1	0	1st, SLC regular season champions, SLC tournament champions, NCAA DI tournament appearance
2020	Southland	Steve Holeman	12	8	4	0	10	7	3	0	2nd, SLC tournament first round
2021	WAC	Steve Holeman	20	10	8	2	10	6	2	2	2nd, Southwest Division, WAC Tournament semi-final match
		Steve Holeman	117	66	43	8	64	41	16	7	
2022	Southland	Nathan Kogut	19	15	2	2	12	10	1	1	1st, SLC regular season champions, SLC tournament champions, NCAA DI tournament appearance
2023	Southland	Nathan Kogut	21	15	3	3	10	9	0	1	1st, SLC regular season champions, SLC tournament champions. NCAA DI tournament appearance
2024	Southland	Nathan Kogut	19	5	8	6	10	3	3	4	7th, First round SLC tournament
		Nathan Kogut	59	35	13	11	32	22	4	6	
Team; Overall			344	154	158	32	184	93	70	22	

(Results reflect games through Nov 5, 2024.)

== Post season appearances ==
=== Lamar Lady Cardinals in the NCAA Tournament ===
- The NCAA Division I Women's Soccer Tournament started in 1982.
- The format of the tournament has changed through the years.

Year	Record	Pct	Notes
2017	0–1	.000	College Station, TX Regional; Lost to #6 Texas A&M (0–1)
2019	0–1	.000	Los Angeles, CA Regional; Lost to #14 UCLA (1–4)
2022	0–1	.000	Baton Rouge, LA Regional; Lost to #8 LSU ( 1–3 )
2023	0–0	.000	Austin, Texas, FSU Bracket; Lost to #5 Texas ( 0–2 )
TOTALS	0–4	.000	4 NCAA Division I Tournament Appearances

=== Conference Tournaments ===
Year	Conference	Record	%	Notes
Southland Conference Tournament Results
2010	Southland	0–1	.000	
2011	Southland	0–1	.000	
2012	Southland	1–1	.500	Tournament runner up
2017	Southland	3–0	1.000	Tournament Champions
2018	Southland	1–1	.500	Tournament semifinals
2019	Southland	3–0	1.000	Tournament Champions
2020	Southland	0–1	.000	First round
Western Athletic Conference Tournament Results
2021	WAC	1–1	.500	Semi-finals
Southland Conference Tournament Results
2022	Southland	2–0	1.000	Tournament champions
2023	Southland	1–0–1 (tie broken on penalty kicks LU 5–4)	.750	Tournament champions
2024	Southland	0–1–0	.000	First round
Total		12–7–1	.625	11 Appearances

== Awards and honors ==
=== All American ===
- Esther Okoronkwo 2020 (3rd)

=== All Region ===
- Lucy Ashworth 2017 (3rd), 2019 (1st)
- Kelso Peskin 2018 (3rd)
- Juana Plata 2019 (3rd)
- Esther Okoronkwo 2019 (1st), 2020 (1st)
- Madison Ledet 2020 (2nd)
- Sophia Manibo 2020 (2nd)
- Christine Kitaru 2021 (3rd)
- Cariel Ellis 2022, 2023 (2nd)
- Hollie Massey 2023 (2nd)
- Arely Alaniz 2023 (3rd)
- Nicole Panis 2023 (3rd)

=== Southland Conference ===
==== All Conference First Team ====
- Jordan Mulnix 2015
- Marie Lund 2017
- M. J. Ekart 2017
- Kelso Peskin 2017, 2018
- Lucy Ashworth 2017, 2019
- Juliana Ocampo 2018
- Juana Plata 2019
- Anna Loftus 2019
- Esther Okoronkwo 2019
- Madison Ledet 2020
- Arely Alaniz 2022, 2023
- Cariel Ellis 2022, 2023
- Kaisa Juvonen 2022, 2023
- Kristine Kitaru 2022
- Hollie Massey 2022, 2023
- Nicole Panis 2022, 2023
- Isela Ramirez 2022, 2023
- Alana Clark 2023

==== Player of the Year ====
- Lucy Ashworth 2019
- Esther Okoronkwo 2020
- Hollie Massey 2023

==== Newcomer of the Year ====
- Kelso Peskin 2017
- Esther Okoronkwo 2019

==== Defender of the Year ====
- Arely Alaniz 2022, 2023

==== Forward of the Year ====
- Lucy Ashworth 2019
- Esther Okoronkwo 2020

==== Goalkeeper of the Year ====
- Nicole Panis 2022, 2023

==== Midfielder of the Year ====
- Juliana Ocampo 2018
- Madison Ledet 2020
- Alana Clark 2023

==== Coach of the Year ====
- Steve Holeman 2017, 2019
- Nathan Kogut 2022, 2023

== Yearly attendance ==
Below is the Lady Cardinals' yearly home attendance since program inception.

Season	Average	High
Soccer Complex Attendance
2024	493	994
2023	506	636
2022	438	702
2021	172	263*
2020	75	189*
2019	245	505
2018	333	588
2017	299	695
2016	250	433
2015	326	602
2014	237	323
2013	321	493
2012	261	362
2011	353	527
2010	400	562
2009	321	513
Cardinal Stadium Attendance
2008	310	421
2007	260	335

The attendance record of 994 was set vs Texas A&M on August 15, 2024.

- Stadium capacity limited due to COVID19 restrictions.

== 2024 Lamar Lady Cardinals soccer team ==
2024 Lamar Lady Cardinals soccer
- Conference: Southland Conference
- Record: 5–8–6 (3–3–4 SLC)
- Head coach: Nathan Kogut (3rd season)
- Assistant coaches: Kurt Albrecht (3rd season); Colton Bryant (3rd season)
- Home stadium: Lamar Soccer Complex

2024 Southland Conference women's soccer standings
	Conf.						Overall
Team	W		L		T	PCT	W		L		T	PCT
Stephen F. Austin ‍†‍‡‍^{y}	8	–	2	–	0	.800	14	–	4	–	2	.750
Texas A&M–CC ‍‍‍	6	–	2	–	2	.700	10	–	5	–	5	.625
East Texas A&M ‍‍‍	6	–	3	–	1	.650	9	–	10	–	3	.477
Northwestern St ‍‍‍	6	–	3	–	1	.650	11	–	8	–	2	.571
SE Louisiana ‍‍‍	5	–	4	–	1	.550	6	–	9	–	2	.412
Incarnate Word ‍‍‍	5	–	4	–	1	.550	8	–	8	–	3	.500
Lamar ‍‍‍	3	–	3	–	4	.500	5	–	8	–	6	.421
UT Rio Grande Valley ‍‍‍	3	–	3	–	4	.500	7	–	7	–	5	.500
Houston Christian ‍‍‍	3	–	4	–	3	.450	5	–	9	–	5	.395
McNeese ‍‍‍	1	–	8	–	1	.150	4	–	14	–	1	.237
Nicholls ‍‍‍	0	–	10	–	0	.000	2	–	13	–	1	.156
† – Conference champion ‡ – 2024 Southland Tournament champion y – Invited to the NCAA Tournament; As of December 10, 2024; Rankings from United Soccer Coaches Poll; Source:Southland Conference

The 2024 Lamar Lady Cardinals soccer team represented Lamar University during the 2024 NCAA Division I women's soccer season. The Lady Cardinals were led by head coach Nathan Kogut, in his third season. They played home games at Lamar Soccer Complex. This was the team's 18th season playing organized women's college soccer including their 17th playing in the Southland Conference and a brief one year membership in the Western Athletic Conference in 2021–22. The Lady Cardinals compiled a 5–8–6 overall record finishing in seventh place in the 2024 Southland Conference regular season with a 3–3–4 conference record. The season ended with a 2024 SLC tournament 1–2 loss to #4 seeded Texas.

=== Preseason poll ===
The Southland Conference released their preseason poll on August 9, 2024. The Cardinals were picked to finish first in the conference.

Predicted finish	Team	Votes (1st place)
1	Lamar	200 (20)
2	Texas A&M–Commerce	177 (2)
3	McNeese	147
4	Northwestern State	130
5	Texas A&M–Corpus Christi	112
6	Southeastern Louisiana	105
7	Stephen F. Austin	98
8	Houston Christian	81
9	UT Rio Grande Valley	67
10	Incarnate Word	63
11	Nicholls	30

=== Players ===
Source: as of August 2, 2024

Note: Flags indicate national team as defined under FIFA eligibility rules; some limited exceptions apply. Players may hold more than one non-FIFA nationality.

No.	Pos.	Nation	Player
0	GK	USA	Taylor Howard
1	GK	USA	Maddie Rich
2	DF/FW	USA	Acacia Weis
3	MF/FW	USA	Mariana Cardenas
4	DF/FW	USA	Annika Kassenbrock
5	DF	USA	Reagan Adair
6	MF	USA	Kaitlyn Niemeyer
7	MF/FW	USA	Alana Clark
8	DF	USA	Kaya Williams
9	FW	USA	Isela Ramirez
10	MF	USA	Mia Ferrell
11	FW	USA	Aaliyah Pena
12	MF	USA	Trinity Clark
13	MF	USA	Viviana Duarte
14	DF	USA	Elena Carmody
15	MF/FW	USA	Payton Joost
16	DW	USA	Olivia Smith
17	DF	USA	Ansley Beer

No.	Pos.	Nation	Player
18	FW	USA	Arely Alaniz
19	FW	GHA	Rafiatu Alhassan
20	DF	USA	Maria Poljak
21	FW	USA	Taylor Conway
22	MF	USA	Kacey Beer
23	FW/DF	USA	Anneliese Switzer
24	DF	USA	Lauryn Woodard
25	MF	USA	Erin Dull
26	DF	USA	Ayvah Angala
28	DF	USA	Riley Wilson
30	GK	USA	Jaliyah Clark
31	DF	USA	Reese Carmody
32	DF/FW	USA	Caragan Childs
34	DF	USA	Olivia Manibo
44	FW/MF	USA	Cena Carlson
88	FW	USA	Ronke Abudu
99	FW	USA	Kamryn Harvey

=== Coaching staff ===
Position	Staff
Athletic director	(United States) Jeff O'Malley
Head coach	(United States) Nathan Kogut
Assistant coach	(United States) Kurt Albrecht
Assistant coach	(United States) Colton Bryant
Graduate Assistant Coach	(United States) Kelsey Brann

=== Schedule ===
Date Time, TV	Rank^{#}	Opponent^{#}	Result	Record	Site (Attendance) City, State
Exhibition
August 6*; 7:00 p.m.		Blinn College	3–0	-	Lamar Soccer Complex; Beaumont, TX
Non-conference regular season
August 15*; 7:00 p.m., ESPN+		#25(T) Texas A&M	L 0–5	0–1–0	Lamar Soccer Complex (994); Beaumont, TX
August 22*; 7:00 p.m., ESPN+		at Abilene Christian	T 0–0	0–1–1	Elmer Gray Stadium (264); Abilene, TX
August 25*; 7:00 p.m., ESPN+		Denver	L 0–3	0–2–1	Lamar Socer Complex (400); Beaumont, TX
August 29*; 6:05 p.m., ESPN+		at Rice	L 1–2	0–3–1	Wendel D. Ley Track and Holloway Field (444); Houston, TX
September 1*; 7:00 p.m., ESPN+		Sam Houston	W 2–1	1–3–1	Lamar Soccer Complex (400); Beaumont, TX
September 5*; 1:00 p.m., ESPN+		at South Alabama	L 0–2	1–4–1	The Cage (150); Mobile, AL
September 8*; 7:00 p.m., ESPN+		Texas Southern	W 4–1	2–4–1	Lamar Soccer Complex (550); Beaumont, TX
September 12*; 7:00 p.m., ESPN+		Louisiana	T 1–1	2–4–2	Lamar Soccer Complex (415); Beaumont, TX
Southland Conference Regular season
September 22; 7:00 p.m., ESPN+		at Stephen F. Austin	L 0–3	2–5–2 (0–1–0)	SFA Soccer Field (387); Nacogdoches, TX
September 26; 7:00 p.m., ESPN+		UT Rio Grande Valley	T 0–0	2–5–3 (0–1–1)	Lamar Soccer Complex (262); Beaumont, TX
September 29; 7:00 p.m., ESPN+		Nicholls	W 4–0	3–5–3 (1–1–1)	Lamar Soccer Complex (309); Beaumont, TX
October 4; 7:00 p.m., ESPN+		at Southeastern Louisiana	L 1–2	3–6–3 (1–2–1)	Southeastern Soccer Complex (260); Hammond, LA
October 11; 7:00 p.m., ES{PN+		Texas A&M–Corpus Christi	T 0–0	3–6–4 (1–2–2)	Lamar Soccer Complex (450); Beaumont, TX
October 13; 7:00 p.m., ESPN+		McNeese	W 2–1	4–6–4 (2–2–2)	Lamar Soccer Complex (613); Beaumont, TX
October 18; 7:00 p.m., ESPN+		Houston Christian	T 0–0	4–6–5 (2–2–3)	Sorrells Field (100); Houston, TX
October 20; 1:00 p.m., ESPN+		Texas A&M–Commerce	W 5–2	5–6–5 (3–2–3)	Lion Soccer Field (193); Commerce, TX
October 25; 7:00 p.m., ESPN+		at Northwestern State	L 0–2	5–7–5 (3–3–3)	Lady Demon Soccer Complex (148); Natchitoches, LA
November 1; 7:00 p.m., ESPN+		Incarnate Word	T 0–0	5–7–6 (3–3–4)	Lamar Soccer Complex (500); Beaumont, TX
SLC Tournament
November 5; 7:00 pm, ESPN+	(7)	vs. (2) Texas A&M–Corpus Christi; First round	L 1–2	5–8–6	Dr. Jack Dugan Family Soccer & Track Stadium (194); Corpus Christi, TX
*Non-conference game. ^{#}Rankings from United Soccer Coaches. (#) Tournament seedings in parentheses. All times are in Central.

== 2023 Lamar Lady Cardinals soccer team ==
2023 Lamar Lady Cardinals soccer

SLC regular season and tournament champions

NCAA tournament
- Conference: Southland Conference
- TopDrawerSoccer.com: No. 24
- Record: 15–3–3 (9–0–1 SLC)
- Head coach: Nathan Kogut (2nd season)
- Assistant coaches: Kurt Albrecht (2nd season); Colton Bryant (2nd season)
- Home stadium: Lamar Soccer Complex

2023 Southland Conference women's soccer standings
	Conf.						Overall
Team	W		L		T	PCT	W		L		T	PCT
Lamar ‍†‍‡‍^{y}	9	–	0	–	1	.950	15	–	3	–	3	.786
Texas A&M–Commerce* ‍‍‍	7	–	1	–	2	.800	9	–	7	–	3	.553
McNeese ‍‍‍	5	–	3	–	2	.600	9	–	8	–	4	.524
Northwestern State ‍‍‍	4	–	5	–	1	.450	6	–	10	–	3	.395
Texas A&M–Corpus Christi ‍‍‍	4	–	5	–	1	.450	7	–	8	–	4	.474
Southeastern Louisiana ‍‍‍	4	–	5	–	1	.450	6	–	10	–	2	.389
Houston Christian ‍‍‍	4	–	6	–	0	.400	7	–	11	–	0	.389
Incarnate Word ‍‍‍	3	–	6	–	1	.350	6	–	8	–	2	.438
Nicholls ‍‍‍	0	–	9	–	1	.050	1	–	17	–	1	.079
† – Conference champion ‡ – 2023 Southland Tournament champion y – Invited to the NCAA Tournament; Texas A&M–Commerce ineligible for postseason NCAA Championship play due to transition from NCAA Division II; As of December 5, 2023; Rankings from United Soccer Coaches Poll; Source: Southland Conference

The 2023 Lamar Lady Cardinals soccer team represented Lamar University during the 2023 NCAA Division I women's soccer season. The Lady Cardinals were led by head coach Nathan Kogut, in his second season. They played home games at Lamar Soccer Complex. This was the team's 17th season playing organized women's college soccer including their 16th playing in the Southland Conference and a brief one year membership in the Western Athletic Conference in 2021–22. The Lady Cardinals clinched a tie for their fourth Southland Conference regular season championship with a win over Texas A&M-Corpus Christi on October 20. A tie match with Texas A&M-Commerce and Incarnate Word on October 22 gave the Lady Cardinals the outright conference regular season championship. The Lady Cardinals were ranked in the top 25 in a national poll for the first time in program history when they were ranked #24 in the Top Drawer Soccer Week 12 (October 30 to November 5) poll. The season ended with a 2023 NCAA DI tournament 0-2 loss to #5 seeded Texas.

=== Previous season ===
The Lady Cardinals won the 2022 Southland Conference regular season championship with a 10-1-1 conference record as well as the 2022 Southland Conference women's soccer tournament for the third time in program history. They received the conference auto-bid to the 2022 NCAA Division I women's soccer tournament. The Lady Cardinals' season ended with a 1–3 first round loss to the 8th seeded LSU. The Lady Cardinals overall record was 15–2–2.

=== Preseason poll ===
The Southland Conference released their preseason poll on August 11, 2023. The Cardinals were picked to finish first in the conference.

Predicted finish	Team	Votes (1st place)
1	Lamar	126 (14)
2	Texas A&M–Commerce	97
3	Southeastern	84
4	Houston Christian	82 (2)
5	Northwestern State	81 (2)
6	Texas A&M–Corpus Christi	68
7	McNeese	53
8	Incarnate Word	33
9	Nicholls	23

=== Players ===
Note: Flags indicate national team as defined under FIFA eligibility rules; some limited exceptions apply. Players may hold more than one non-FIFA nationality.

No.	Pos.	Nation	Player
0	GK	USA	Maddie Rich
1	GK	NED	Nicole Panis
2	MF	USA	Sabrina Lopez
3	MF/FW	USA	Mariana Cardenas
4	DF/FW	USA	Annika Kassenbrock
5	DF/FW	USA	Emmi Sullivan
6	MF	USA	Kaitlyn Niemeyer
7	MF/FW	USA	Alana Clark
8	DF	USA	Kaya Williams
9	FW	USA	Isela Ramirez
10	MF	ESP	Laura Linares
11	FW	BRA	Kauany Sousa
12	MF	USA	Trinity Clark
13	MF	USA	Viviana Duarte
14	FW	USA	Cariel Ellis
15	MF/FW	USA	Payton Joost
16	FW	USA	Caragan Childs

No.	Pos.	Nation	Player
17	DF/FW	USA	Ayvah Angala
18	FW	USA	Arely Alaniz
19	FW	KEN	Rafiatu Alhassan
20	DF	USA	Emmy Wood
21	FW	USA	Taylor Conway
22	MF	FIN	Kaisa Juvonen
23	MF	ISL	Eva Karen
24	MF/FW	USA	Grace Richard
25	FW	USA	Kolbi Coleman
26	MF/FW	USA	Addison Russu
27	DF	USA	Madison Rabideau
28	DF	USA	Riley Wilson
29	GK	USA	Anne Marie Cabello
30	GK	ENG	Hollie Massey
44	DF	USA	Maddie Janolo
99	FW	USA	Kamryn Harvey

=== Coaching staff ===
Position	Staff
Athletic director	(United States) Jeff O'Malley
Head coach	(United States) Nathan Kogut
Assistant coach	(United States) Kurt Albrecht
Assistant coach	(United States) Colton Bryant
Graduate Assistant Coach	(United States) Kelsey Brann

=== Schedule ===
Date Time, TV	Rank^{#}	Opponent^{#}	Result	Record	Site (Attendance) City, State
Exhibition
August 6*; 7:00 p.m., ESPN+		LSU-Eunice	6–0	-	Lamar Soccer Complex; Beaumont, TX
Non-conference regular season
August 18*; 7:00 p.m., ESPN+		Abilene Christian	L 0–1	0–1–0	Lamar Soccer Complex (636); Beaumont, TX
August 24*; 7:00 p.m., ESPN+		at Sam Houston	W 1–0	1–1–0	Pritchett Field (175); Huntsville, TX
August 27*; 5:00 p.m.		at Grambling	T 0–0	1–1–1	GSU Soccer Complex (85); Grambling, LA
September 1*; 7:00 p.m., ESPN+		South Alabama	L 0–3	1–2–1	Lamar Soccer Complex (433); Beaumont, TX
September 3*; 1:00 p.m., ESPN+		at Tarleton State	W 3–0	2–2–1	Tarleton Soccer Complex (327); Stephenville, TX
September 7*; 7:00 p.m., ESPN+		Southern	W 3–0	3–2–1	Lamar Soccer Complex (301); Beaumont, TX
September 10*; 5:00 p.m., ESPN+		at Louisiana	W 2–0	4–2–1	Ragin' Cajuns Soccer/Track Facility (115); Lafayette, LA
September 14*; 7:00 p.m., ESPN+		No. 17 Xavier	W 1–0	5–2–1	Lamar Soccer Complex (502); Beaumont, TX
Southland Conference Regular season
September 17; 1:00 p.m., ESPN+		at Incarnate Word	W 2–0	6–2–1 (1–0–0)	Gayle and Tom Benson Stadium (126); San Antonio, TX
September 22; 7:00 p.m., ESPN+		Houston Christian	W 4–1	7–2–1 (2–0–0)	Lamar Soccer Complex (528); Beaumont, TX
September 29; 7:00 p.m.		at Nicholls	W 5–1	8–2–1 (3–0–0)	Thibodaux Regional Sports Complex (213); Thibodaux, LA
October 1; 1:00 p.m., ESPN+		at Southeastern Louisiana	W 1–0	9–2–1 (4–0–0)	Southeastern Soccer Complex (182); Hammond, LA
October 6; 7:00 p.m., ESPN+		Northwestern State	W 1–0	10–2–1 (5–0–0)	Lamar Soccer Complex (622); Beaumont, TX
October 8; 1:00 p.m., ESPN+		at McNeese	W 2–1	11–2–1 (6–0–0)	Cowgirl Field (193); Lake Charles, LA
October 13; 7:00 p.m., ESPN+		Incarnate Word	W 1–0	12–2–1 (7–0–0)	Lamar Soccer Complex (500); Beaumont, TX
October 15; 1:00 p.m., ESPN+		Texas A&M–Commerce	T 2–2	12–2–2 (7–0–1)	Lamar Soccer Complex (506); Beaumont, TX
October 20; 7:00 p.m., ESPN+		at Texas A&M–Corpus Christi	W 1–0	13–2–2 (8–0–1)	Dr. Jack Dugan Family Soccer & Track Stadium (319); Corpus Christi, TX
October 27; 7:00 p.m., ESPN+		Southeastern Louisiana	W 4–1	14–2–2 (9–0–1)	Lamar Soccer Complex (526); Beaumont, TX
SLC Tournament
November 3; 7:00 pm, ESPN+	(1) No. 24 (TDS)	vs. (4) Northwestern State; Second round	T 1–1 (LU PKs 5–4)	14–2–3	Dr. Jack Dugan Family Soccer & Track Stadium (141); Corpus Christi, TX
November 5; 1:00 pm, ESPN+	(1) No. 24 (TDS)	vs. (3) McNeese; Championship	W 3–1	15–2–3	Dr. Jack Dugan Family Soccer & Track Stadium (177); Corpus Christi, TX
NCAA tournament
November 10; 6:00 pm, LHN	No. 24 (TDS)	at (5) No. 13 (TDS) Texas; First round	L 0–2	15–3–3	Mike A. Myers Stadium (1,203); Austin, TX
*Non-conference game. ^{#}Rankings from United Soccer Coaches. (#) Tournament seedings in parentheses. All times are in Central.

== 2022 Lamar Lady Cardinals soccer team ==
2022 Lamar Lady Cardinals soccer

SLC regular season and tournament champions

NCAA tournament
- Conference: Southland Conference
- Record: 15–2–2 (10–1–1 SLC)
- Head coach: Nathan Kogut (1st season)
- Assistant coaches: Kurt Albrecht (1st season); Colton Bryant (1st season)
- Home stadium: Lamar Soccer Complex

2022 Southland Conference women's soccer standings
	Conf.						Overall
Team	W		L		T	PCT	W		L		T	PCT
Lamar ‍†‍‡‍^{y}	10	–	1	–	1	.875	15	–	2	–	2	.842
Northwestern St ‍‍‍	8	–	2	–	2	.750	12	–	4	–	3	.711
Texas A&M-Commerce* ‍‍‍	7	–	4	–	1	.625	9	–	9	–	2	.500
Houston Christian ‍‍‍	6	–	5	–	1	.542	7	–	10	–	3	.425
SE Louisiana ‍‍‍	5	–	4	–	3	.542	7	–	7	–	3	.500
Texas A&M-CC ‍‍‍	5	–	6	–	1	.458	8	–	9	–	1	.472
McNeese ‍‍‍	3	–	5	–	4	.417	5	–	9	–	4	.389
Incarnate Word ‍‍‍	2	–	7	–	3	.292	3	–	10	–	3	.281
Nicholls ‍‍‍	0	–	11	–	0	.000	2	–	15	–	1	.139
† – Conference champion ‡ – 2022 Southland Tournament champion y – Invited to the NCAA Tournament; Texas A&M–Commerce ineligible for postseason NCAA Championship play due to transition from NCAA Division II; As of December 6, 2022; Rankings from United Soccer Coaches Poll; Source:Southland Conference

The 2022 Lamar Lady Cardinals soccer team represents Lamar University during the 2022 NCAA Division I women's soccer season. The Lady Cardinals are led by head coach Nathan Kogut, in his first season. They play home games at Lamar Soccer Complex. This is the team's 16th season playing organized women's college soccer, and their 15th playing in the Southland Conference following a brief one year membership in the Western Athletic Conference in 2021–22. The Lady Cardinals won the Southland Conference regular season championship with a 10-1-1 conference record as well as the 2022 Southland Conference women's soccer tournament for the third time in program history. They received the conference auto-bid to the 2022 NCAA Division I women's soccer tournament. The Lady Cardinals' season ended with a 1–3 first round loss to the 8th seeded LSU. The Lady Cardinals overall record was 15–2–2.

=== Previous season ===
The Lady Cardinals finished 10–8–2 overall and 6–2–2 in 2021 Western Athletic Conference play to finish second in the Southwest Division. Their season ended losing in the 2021 Western Athletic Conference Women's Soccer Tournament semi-finals.

=== Preseason poll ===
The Southland Conference released their preseason poll on August 11, 2022. The Cardinals were picked to finish third in the conference.

Predicted finish	Team	Votes (1st place)
1	Northwestern State	128 (16)
2	McNeese	113 (1)
3	Lamar	77
4	UIW	74
5	Texas A&M–Corpus Christi	72
6	Southeastern	70
7	HCU	56
8	Texas A&M–Commerce	36
9	Nicholls	22

=== Players ===
Note: Flags indicate national team as defined under FIFA eligibility rules; some limited exceptions apply. Players may hold more than one non-FIFA nationality.

No.	Pos.	Nation	Player
0	GK	USA	Vivienne Carr
1	GK	NED	Nicole Panis
2	MF	USA	Sabrina Lopez
3	MF/FW	USA	Isabel Bassa
4	DF/FW	USA	Annika Kassenbrock
5	DF	USA	Meg Sheppard
6	MF	USA	Alana Clark
7	DF	USA	Abby Gemza
8	MF	ENG	Hollie Massey
9	FW	USA	Isela Ramirez
10	MF	ESP	Laura Linares
11	FW	USA	Miranda Urbizu
12	MF	USA	Trinity Clark
13	MF	USA	Crisely Pavon
14	FW	USA	Cariel Ellis

No.	Pos.	Nation	Player
15	MF/FW	USA	Payton Joost
16	DF	USA	Sarah Zimmer
17	MF/FW	USA	Paloma Martinez
18	FW	USA	Arely Alaniz
19	FW	KEN	Christine Kitaru
20	DF	USA	Landry Worsham
21	MF/FW	USA	Dahjah Lewis
22	MF	FIN	Kaisa Juvonen
23	MF	ISL	Eva Karen
24	MF/FW	USA	Grace Richard
25	FW	USA	Kolbi Coleman
27	DF	USA	Madison Rabideau
28	FW	USA	Yainn Zuniga
30	GK	USA	Morgan McBride
44	DF	USA	Maddie Janolo

=== Coaching staff ===
Position	Staff
Athletic director	(United States) Jeff O'Malley
Head coach	(United States) Nathan Kogut
Assistant coach	(United States) Kurt Albrecht
Assistant coach	(United States) Colton Bryant
Graduate Assistant Coach	(United States) Kelsey Brann

=== Schedule ===
Date Time, TV	Rank^{#}	Opponent^{#}	Result	Record	Site (Attendance) City, State
Exhibition
August 11*; 7:30 p.m.		at Houston Baptist	–	-	Husky Field; Houston, TX
Non-conference regular season
August 21*; 7:00 p.m.		Houston	W 3–0	1–0–0	Lamar Soccer Complex (665); Beaumont, TX
August 26*; 5:30 p.m.		Texas Southern; Canceled		1–0–0	Lamar Soccer Complex; Beaumont, TX
August 28*; 1:00 p.m.		Tarleton	W 5–1	2–0–0	Lamar Soccer Complex (295); Beaumont, TX
September 1*; 7:00 p.m.		Louisiana	W 4–1	3–0–0	Lamar Soccer Complex (304); Beaumont, TX
September 8*; 7:00 p.m., ESPN+		at South Alabama	T 0–0	3–0–1	The Cage (75); Mobile, AL
Southland Conference Regular season
September 11; 1:00 p.m.		Texas A&M–Corpus Christi	W 1–0	4–0–1 (1–0–0)	Lamar Soccer Complex (314); Beaumont, TX
September 16; 7:00 p.m., DemonTV		at Northwestern State	W 2–0	5–0–1 (2–0–0)	Lady Demon Soccer Complex (200); Natchitoches, LA
September 18; 1:00 p.m.		Texas A&M–Commerce	W 3–1	6–0–1 (3–0–0)	Lamar Soccer Complex (271); Beaumont, TX
September 25; 1:00 p.m.		at Nicholls	W 4–0	7–0–1 (4–0–0)	Nicholls Soccer Complex (143); Thibodaux, LA
September 30; 7:00 p.m.		UIW	W 2–0	8–0–1 (5–0–0)	Lamar Soccer Complex (702); Beaumont, TX
October 2; 1:00 p.m., ESPN+		at Southeastern	W 1–0	9–0–1 (6–0–0)	Strawberry Stadium (111); Hammond, LA
October 7; 7:00 p.m.		Northwestern State	L 0–2	9–1–1 (6–1–0)	Lamar Soccer Complex (574); Beaumont, TX
October 9; 1:00 p.m.		McNeese	T 1–1	9–1–2 (6–1–1)	Lamar Soccer Complex (545); Beaumont, TX
October 14; 7:00 p.m., ESPN+		at Texas A&M–Commerce	W 2–1	10–1–2 (7–1–1)	Lion Soccer Field (388); Commerce, TX
October 21; 7:00 p.m., ESPN+		at HCU	W 3–0	11–1–2 (8–1–1)	Husky Field (189); Houston, TX
October 23; 1:00 p.m., ESPN+		at Texas A&M–Corpus Christi	W 2–1	12–1–2 (9–1–1)	Dr. Jack Dugan Soccer & Track Stadium (268); Corpus Christi, TX
October 28; 1:00 p.m.		Nicholls	W 1–0	13–1–2 (10–1–1)	Lamar Soccer Complex (274); Beaumont, TX
SLC Tournament
November 4; 11:00 a.m., ESPN+	(1)	vs. (4) Houston Christian; Semifinal	W 1–0	14–1–2	Lady Demon Soccer Complex (100); Natchitoches, LA
November 6; 2:00 p.m., ESPN+	(1)	vs. (3) Texas A&M–Commerce; Final	W 4–1	15–1–2	Lady Demon Soccer Complex (130); Natchitoches, LA
NCAA Division I Tournament
November 11; 5:30 pm		at (8) LSU; First round	L 1–3	15–2–2	LSU Soccer Stadium (1,524); Baton Rouge, LA
*Non-conference game. ^{#}Rankings from United Soccer Coaches. (#) Tournament seedings in parentheses. All times are in Central.

== 2021 Lamar Lady Cardinals soccer team ==
2021 Lamar Lady Cardinals soccer
- Conference: Western Athletic Conference
- Southwest Division
- Record: 10–8–2 (6–2–2 WAC)
- Head coach: Steve Holeman (6th season)
- Assistant coaches: Nathan Stockie (4th season); Hannah Smith (1st season)
- Home stadium: Lamar Soccer Complex

2021 WAC women's soccer standings
	Conf.						Overall
Team	W		L		T	PCT	W		L		T	PCT
Southwest
Stephen F. Austin ‍†‍‍	8	–	2	–	0	.800	10	–	8	–	1	.553
Lamar ‍‍‍	6	–	2	–	2	.700	10	–	8	–	2	.550
Sam Houston State ‍‍‍	6	–	4	–	0	.600	8	–	10	–	0	.444
Abilene Christian ‍‍‍	4	–	5	–	1	.450	6	–	9	–	1	.406
Texas–Rio Grande Valley ‍‍‍	2	–	7	–	1	.250	6	–	12	–	2	.350
Chicago State ‍‍‍	2	–	8	–	0	.200	2	–	14	–	1	.147
West
Grand Canyon ‍†‍‡‍^{y}	7	–	1	–	2	.800	16	–	4	–	2	.773
Utah Valley ‍‍‍	6	–	2	–	2	.700	13	–	7	–	2	.636
New Mexico State ‍‍‍	5	–	5	–	0	.500	9	–	11	–	0	.450
California Baptist* ‍‍‍	4	–	4	–	2	.500	6	–	8	–	3	.441
Dixie State* ‍‍‍	2	–	7	–	1	.250	6	–	13	–	1	.325
Seattle ‍‍‍	1	–	6	–	3	.250	7	–	8	–	4	.474
† – Conference champion ‡ – 2021 WAC Tournament champion y – Invited to the NCAA Tournament * ineligible for the 2021 NCAA Tournament due to transition from Division II; As of December 7, 2021; Rankings from United Soccer Coaches Poll; Source:WAC

The 2021 Lamar Lady Cardinals soccer team represented Lamar University during the 2021 NCAA Division I women's soccer season. The Lady Cardinals were led by head coach Steve Holeman, in his sixth season. They played home games at Lamar Soccer Complex. This was the team's 15th season playing organized women's college soccer, and their 1st playing in the Western Athletic Conference. The Lady Cardinals finished the season in second place in the WAC Southwest division, 10–8–2 overall, and 5–2–2 in divisional play. The team won its first round match against New Mexico State 1–0 in the Western Athletic Conference women's soccer tournament. The team's season ended with a loss to Grand Canyon 0–1 in the tournament semi–final round.

Note: Stadium capacity restrictions continued during the season due to COVID-19 precautions.

=== Previous season ===
The Lady Cardinals finished 8–4–0 overall and 7–3–0 in 2020 Southland Conference play to finish second in the conference. Their season ended with a first round loss in the 2020 Southland Conference Women's Soccer Tournament.

=== Players ===
2021 Roster

Note: Flags indicate national team as defined under FIFA eligibility rules; some limited exceptions apply. Players may hold more than one non-FIFA nationality.

No.	Pos.	Nation	Player
0	GK	USA	Vivienne Carr
1	GK	NED	Nicole Panis
2	MF	USA	Sabrina Lopez
3	MF/FW	USA	Isabel Bassa
4	DF	ESP	Marina Mielgo
5	DF	USA	Meg Sheppard
7	DF	USA	Abby Gemza
8	MF	ENG	Hollie Massey
9	FW	USA	Isela Ramirez
10	MF	USA	Mackenzie Harvey

No.	Pos.	Nation	Player
12	DF	USA	Juana Plata
14	DF	USA	Anessa Byerman
17	MF/FW	USA	Paloma Martinez
18	FW	USA	Arely Alaniz
19	FW	KEN	Christine Kitaru
21	MF	ESP	Laura Linares
22	MF	FIN	Kaisa Juvonen
23	MF	ISL	Eva Karen
24	MF/FW	USA	Grace Richard
28	FW	USA	Carina Leal

=== Coaching staff ===
Position	Staff
Athletic director	(United States) Marco Born
Head coach	(United States) Steve Holeman
Assistant coach	(United States) Nathan Stockie
Assistant coach	(United States) Hannah Smith
Strength and conditioning Coach	(United States) Jacob Economou

=== Schedule ===
Date Time, TV	Rank^{#}	Opponent^{#}	Result	Record	Site (Attendance) City, State
Exhibition
August 11*; 7:30 p.m.		Houston Baptist	2–0	-	Lamar Soccer Complex; Beaumont, TX
August 14*; 6:00 p.m.		at Rice	1–2	-	Holloway Field; Houston, TX
Non-conference regular season
August 19*; 5:00 p.m.		Grambling	W 3–1	1–0–0	Lamar Soccer Complex (136); Beaumont, TX
August 22*; 7:30 p.m.		Oklahoma	L 0–4	1–1–0	Lamar Soccer Complex (161); Beaumont, TX
August 27*; 7:00 p.m.		at Alabama	L 1–3	1–2–0	Alabama Soccer Stadium (528); Tuscaloosa, AL
August 29*; 1:00 p.m.		Jackson State; Canceled		1–2–0	JSU Soccer Field; Jackson, MS
September 2*; 7:00 p.m.		at Houston	L 0–3	1–3–0	Carl Lewis International Complex (157); Houston, TX
September 5*; 1:00 p.m.		Alcorn State	W 9–0	2–3–0	Lamar Soccer Complex (163); Beaumont, TX
September 10*; 7:30 p.m.		at UTSA	L 1–2	2–4–0	Park West Athletics Complex (478); San Antonio, TX
September 12*; 11:00 a.m.		vs. Arkansas	L 0–6	2–5–0	Park West Athletics Complex (112); San Antonio, TX
September 16*; 6:00 p.m.		at Louisiana College	W 2–0	3–5–0	Wildcat Field (119); Pineville, LA
Western Athletic Conference Regular season
September 24; 7:00 p.m.		at Abilene Christian	T 0–0	3–5–1 (0–0–1)	Elmer Gray Stadium (233); Abilene, TX
September 26; 12:00 p.m.		at Chicago State	W 3–1	4–5–1 (1–0–1)	Seatgeek Stadium (100); Bridgeview, IL
September 30; 7:00 p.m.		Stephen F. Austin	L 1–2	4–6–1 (1–1–1)	Lamar Soccer Complex (165); Beaumont, TX
October 3; 7:00 p.m.		Sam Houston	W 2–1	5–6–1 (2–1–1)	Lamar Soccer Complex (186); Beaumont, TX
October 9; 7:00 p.m.		UTRGV	W 2–0	6–6–1 (3–1–1)	Lamar Soccer Complex (146); Beaumont, TX
October 15; 7:00 p.m.		at Sam Houston	W 2–1	7–6–1 (4–1–1)	Pritchett Field (345); Huntsville, TX
October 17; 1:00 p.m.		at Stephen F. Austin	L 0–1	7–7–1 (4–2–1)	SFA Soccer Field (200); Nacogdoches, TX
October 23; 7:00 p.m.		at UTRGV	T 0–0	7–7–2 (4–2–2)	UTRGV Soccer and Track & Field Complex (237); Edinburg, TX
October 28; 7:00 p.m.		Chicago State	W 2–0	8–7–2 (5–2–2)	Lamar Soccer Complex (153); Beaumont, TX
October 30; 1:00 p.m.		Abilene Christian	W 1–0	9–7–2 (5–2–2)	Lamar Soccer Complex (263); Beaumont, TX
Western Athletic Conference Women's Soccer Tournament
November 3; 4:00 p.m.		vs. New Mexico State; 1st round	W 1–0	10–7–2	Elmer Gray Stadium (31); Abilene, TX
November 5; 4:00 p.m.		vs. Grand Canyon; Semi-finals	L 1–2	10–8–2	Elmer Gray Stadium (118); Abilene, TX
*Non-conference game. ^{#}Rankings from United Soccer Coaches. (#) Tournament seedings in parentheses. All times are in Central.
