= 2024 Southland Conference women's soccer tournament =

- Classification: Division I
- Teams: 8
- Matches: 7
- Attendance: 1,326
- Site: Dr. Jack Dugan Soccer & Track Stadium; Corpus Christi, Texas
- Champions: Stephen F. Austin (4th title)
- Winning coach: Ben Williams (1st title)
- MVP: Jayme Bailey (Stephen F. Austin)
- Broadcast: ESPN+

2024 Southland Conference women's soccer standings
	Conf.						Overall
Team	W		L		T	PCT	W		L		T	PCT
Stephen F. Austin ‍†‍‡‍^{y}	8	–	2	–	0	.800	14	–	4	–	2	.750
Texas A&M–CC ‍‍‍	6	–	2	–	2	.700	10	–	5	–	5	.625
East Texas A&M ‍‍‍	6	–	3	–	1	.650	9	–	10	–	3	.477
Northwestern St ‍‍‍	6	–	3	–	1	.650	11	–	8	–	2	.571
SE Louisiana ‍‍‍	5	–	4	–	1	.550	6	–	9	–	2	.412
Incarnate Word ‍‍‍	5	–	4	–	1	.550	8	–	8	–	3	.500
Lamar ‍‍‍	3	–	3	–	4	.500	5	–	8	–	6	.421
UT Rio Grande Valley ‍‍‍	3	–	3	–	4	.500	7	–	7	–	5	.500
Houston Christian ‍‍‍	3	–	4	–	3	.450	5	–	9	–	5	.395
McNeese ‍‍‍	1	–	8	–	1	.150	4	–	14	–	1	.237
Nicholls ‍‍‍	0	–	10	–	0	.000	2	–	13	–	1	.156
† – Conference champion ‡ – 2024 Southland Tournament champion y – Invited to the NCAA Tournament; As of December 10, 2024; Rankings from United Soccer Coaches Poll; Source:Southland Conference

The 2024 Southland Conference women's soccer tournament, the postseason women's soccer tournament for the Southland Conference, was held from November 5 to November 10, 2024. The seven-match tournament took place at the Dr. Jack Dugan Soccer & Track Stadium in Corpus Christi, Texas. The eight-team single-elimination tournament consisted of three rounds based on seeding from regular season conference play. The defending champions were the Lamar Lady Cardinals, but they were unable to defend their title falling in the first round to Texas A&M–Corpus Christi 2–1. The Stephen F. Austin Ladyjacks won the tournament, defeating East Texas A&M 2–0 in the final.

== Media and TV ==
All matches were broadcast on ESPN+.

== Bracket ==
Quarterfinals; Tuesday,November 5 ESPN+
1	Stephen F. Austin	3
8	UT Rio Grande Valley	1
4	Northwestern State	2 (1)
5	Southeastern	1 (0)
3	East Texas A&M	2
6	Incarnate Word	1
2	Texas A&M–Corpus Christi	2
7	Lamar	1

Semifinals; Thursday, November 7 ESPN+
1	Stephen F. Austin	1 (1)
4	Northwestern State	0 (0)
2	Texas A&M–Corpus Christi	1
3	East Texas A&M	2

Final; Sunday, November 10; ESPN+
1	Stephen F. Austin	2
3	East Texas A&M	0

== All-Tournament team ==
Player	Team
**Jayme Bailey**	Stephen F. Austin
Ella Morgan	Stephen F. Austin
Erin Morgan	Stephen F. Austin
Maddie Bowers	Stephen F. Austin
Brielle Buchanan	Stephen F. Austin
Ava Shannon	Stephen F. Austin
Nia Chacon	East Texas A&M
Savannah Powell	East Texas A&M
Kaydence Ramirez	East Texas A&M
Libe Banuelos, Northwestern State	Northwestern State
Storm Harris	Texas A&M–Corpus Christi

MVP in bold
