= 2019 Southland Conference women's soccer tournament =

- Classification: Division I
- Teams: 8
- Matches: 7
- Site: Bill Stephens Track/Soccer Complex; Conway, Arkansas
- Champions: Lamar (2nd title)
- Winning coach: Steve Holeman (2nd title)
- MVP: Esther Okoronkwo (Lamar)
- Broadcast: Southland Digital Network; ESPN+ (Final)

2019 Southland Conference women's soccer standings
	Conf.						Overall
Team	W		L		T	PCT	W		L		T	PCT
Lamar ‍†‍‡‍^{y}	10	–	1	–	0	.909	16	–	7	–	0	.696
Abilene Christian ‍‍‍	8	–	2	–	1	.773	12	–	5	–	2	.684
Northwestern St ‍‍‍	8	–	2	–	1	.773	13	–	8	–	1	.614
Incarnate Word ‍‍‍	7	–	4	–	0	.636	8	–	10	–	1	.447
Texas A&M-CC ‍‍‍	6	–	4	–	1	.591	9	–	9	–	2	.500
McNeese St ‍‍‍	6	–	5	–	0	.545	11	–	9	–	0	.550
Sam Houston St ‍‍‍	5	–	5	–	1	.500	11	–	9	–	1	.548
Stephen F. Austin ‍‍‍	5	–	6	–	0	.455	7	–	11	–	1	.395
Cent. Arkansas ‍‍‍	4	–	7	–	0	.364	5	–	12	–	1	.306
SE Louisiana ‍‍‍	3	–	8	–	0	.273	4	–	13	–	1	.250
Houston Baptist ‍‍‍	2	–	9	–	0	.182	3	–	15	–	0	.167
Nicholls ‍‍‍	0	–	11	–	0	.000	3	–	14	–	1	.194
† – Conference champion ‡ – 2019 Southland Tournament champion y – Invited to the NCAA tournament As of December 9, 2019; Rankings from United Soccer Coaches Poll; Source:Southland Conference

The 2019 Southland Conference women's soccer tournament, the postseason women's soccer tournament for the Southland Conference, was held from November 6 to November 10, 2019. The seven-match tournament took place at the Bill Stephens Track/Soccer Complex in Conway, Arkansas. The eight-team single-elimination tournament consisted of three rounds based on seeding from regular season conference play. The defending champions were the Abilene Christian Wildcats, but they were unable to defend their title falling in the first round to McNeese State 2–1. The Lamar Cardinals won the tournament, defeating Northwestern State 3–1 in the final. The title was the second overall for the Lamar Cardinals program, both of which have come under head coach Steve Holeman.

== Media and TV ==
Broadcast of the quarterfinal and semifinal rounds were on the Southland Conference Digital Network. The championship game was broadcast on ESPN+.

== Bracket ==
Quarterfinals; Wednesday, Nov. 6 SLC Digital
1	Lamar	6
8	Stephen F. Austin	2
4	Incarnate Word	2 (2)
5	Texas A&M–Corpus Christi	2 (4)
2	Northwestern State	3
7	Sam Houston State	0
3	Abilene Christian	1
6	McNeese State	2

Semifinals; Friday, Nov. 8 SLC Digital
1	Lamar	5
5	Texas A&M–Corpus Christi	1
2	Northwestern State	1^{OT}
6	McNeese State	0

Final; Sunday, Nov. 10; ESPN+
1	Lamar	3
2	Northwestern State	1

== Schedule ==
=== Quarterfinals ===
November 6, 2019	#2 Northwestern State	3–0	#7 Sam Houston State	Conway, Arkansas
11:00 a.m. CST	Jayden Wheeler 1'; Karleigh Acosta 14'; Kalee Williams 22'	Report		Stadium: Bill Stephens Track/Soccer Complex; Referee: Brandon Gardner; Assistant referees: Matthew Geringer; Ken Mizuno; Fourth official: Charles Farr

November 6, 2019	#3 Abilene Christian	1–2	#6 McNeese State	Conway, Arkansas
2:00 p.m. CST	Caylen Wright 58'	Report	63' Rachel Young; 73' Mariah Ruelas	Stadium: Bill Stephens Track/Soccer Complex; Attendance: 223; Referee: Andrew Ellsworth; Assistant referees: Fevzi Demirhan; Ryan Poole; Fourth official: Matthew Garrenger

November 6, 2019	#1 Lamar	6–2	#8 Stephen F. Austin	Conway, Arkansas
5:00 p.m. CST	Stephen F. Austin Own Goal 15'; Esther Okoronkwo 16', 30', 33', 56'; Anna Loftus 77'	Report	56' Katelyn Termini; 81' Mattie Musser	Stadium: Bill Stephens Track/Soccer Complex; Referee: Charles Farr; Assistant referees: Ken Mizuno; Jacson Rector; Fourth official: Andrew Ellsworth

November 6, 2019	#4 Incarnate Word	2–2 (a.e.t.) (2–4 p)	#5 Texas A&M-Corpus Christi	Conway, Arkansas
8:00 p.m. CST	Keely Ayala (yellow card) 79'; Andrea Reyes 80'; Jade Piper 87'	Report	9' Abby Deakin; 48' Dana Curtis; (yellow card) 76' Maddie Janolo	Stadium: Bill Stephens Track/Soccer Complex; Referee: Matthew Thompson; Assistant referees: David Henderson; Fevzi Demirhan; Fourth official: Lawrence Hale
	Penalties
	Keeley Ayala (penalty missed); Brooke Hanson (penalty missed); Hannah Walsh (penalty scored); Ana Campa (penalty scored)		(penalty missed) Emma Gibbs; (penalty scored) Madeleine Lozano; (penalty scored) Dana Curtis; (penalty scored) Reaghan Lang; (penalty scored) Larissa Fagundes

=== Semifinals ===
November 8, 2019	#2 Northwestern State	1–0 (a.e.t.)	#6 McNeese State	Conway, Arkansas
4:00 p.m. CST	Jayden Wheeler (yellow card) 63'; Olivia Draguicevich 97'	Report		Stadium: Bill Stephens Track/Soccer Complex; Referee: Travis Haight; Assistant referees: Jervis Atagana; Fevzi Demirhan; Fourth official: Matthew Thompson

November 8, 2019	#1 Lamar	5–1	#5 Texas A&M-Corpus Christi	Conway, Arkansas
7:00 p.m. CST	Sophia Manibo 27'; Lucy Ashworth 28', 50'; Kaisa Juvonen 50'; Alisha Nesbitt (yellow card) 81', (goal) 84'	Report	85' Emma Gibbs	Stadium: Bill Stephens Track/Soccer Complex; Referee: Jose Lara-Mancia; Assistant referees: Ken Mizuno; Charles Farr; Fourth official: Travis Haight

=== Final ===
November 10, 2019	#1 Lamar	3–1	#2 Northwestern State	Conway, Arkansas
1:05 p.m. CST	Lucy Ashworth 31', (yellow card) 85'; Esther Okoronkwo 50', 53'	Report	66' Nicole Henry; (yellow card) 85' Olivia Draguicevich	Stadium: Bill Stephens Track/Soccer Complex

== Statistics ==
=== Goalscorers ===
6 Goals

- Esther Okoronkwo (Lamar)

3 Goals

- Lucy Ashworth (Lamar)

1 Goal

- Karleigh Acosta (Northwestern State)
- Dana Curtis (Texas A&M-Corpus Christi)
- Abby Deakin (Texas A&M-Corpus Christi)
- Olivia Draguicevich (Northwestern State)
- Emma Gibbs (Texas A&M-Corpus Christi)
- Nicole Henry (Northwestern State)
- Kaisa Juvonen (Lamar)
- Anna Loftus (Lamar)
- Sophia Manibo (Lamar)
- Mattie Musser (Stephen F. Austin)
- Alisha Nesbitt (Lamar)
- Jade Piper (Incarnate Word)
- Andrea Reyes (Incarnate Word)
- Mariah Ruelas (McNesse State)
- Katelyn Termini (Stephen F. Austin)
- Jayden Wheeler (Northwestern State)
- Kalee Williams (Northwestern State)
- Caylen Wright (Abilene Christian)
- Rachel Young (McNeese State)

Own Goals

- Stephen F. Austin vs. Lamar

== All-Tournament team ==
Player	Team
**Esther Okoronkwo**	Lamar
Lucy Ashworth	Lamar
Madison Ledet	Lamar
Macie McFarland	Lamar
Acelya Aydogmus	Northwestern State
Nicole Henry	Northwestern State
Olivia Mattson	Northwestern State
Brianna Mascia	McNeese State
Mariah Ruelas	McNeese State
Dana Curtis	Texas A&M-Corpus Christi
Abby Deakin	Texas A&M-Corpus Christi

MVP in bold
