= 2023 Southland Conference women's soccer tournament =

College women's soccer tournament

- Classification: Division I
- Teams: 7
- Matches: 6
- Attendance: 897
- Site: Dr. Jack Dugan Soccer & Track Stadium; Corpus Christi, Texas
- Champions: Lamar (4 title)
- Winning coach: Nathan Kougat (2 title)
- MVP: Arely Alaniz (Lamar)
- Broadcast: ESPN+

2023 Southland Conference women's soccer standings
	Conf.						Overall
Team	W		L		T	PCT	W		L		T	PCT
Lamar ‍†‍‡‍^{y}	9	–	0	–	1	.950	15	–	3	–	3	.786
Texas A&M–Commerce* ‍‍‍	7	–	1	–	2	.800	9	–	7	–	3	.553
McNeese ‍‍‍	5	–	3	–	2	.600	9	–	8	–	4	.524
Northwestern State ‍‍‍	4	–	5	–	1	.450	6	–	10	–	3	.395
Texas A&M–Corpus Christi ‍‍‍	4	–	5	–	1	.450	7	–	8	–	4	.474
Southeastern Louisiana ‍‍‍	4	–	5	–	1	.450	6	–	10	–	2	.389
Houston Christian ‍‍‍	4	–	6	–	0	.400	7	–	11	–	0	.389
Incarnate Word ‍‍‍	3	–	6	–	1	.350	6	–	8	–	2	.438
Nicholls ‍‍‍	0	–	9	–	1	.050	1	–	17	–	1	.079
† – Conference champion ‡ – 2023 Southland Tournament champion y – Invited to the NCAA Tournament: Texas A&M–Commerce ineligible for postseason NCAA Championship play due to transition from NCAA Division II As of December 5, 2023 Rankings from United Soccer Coaches Poll Source: Southland Conference

The 2023 Southland Conference women's soccer tournament, the postseason women's soccer tournament for the Southland Conference, was held from November 1 to November 5, 2023. The six-match tournament took place at the Dr. Jack Dugan Soccer & Track Stadium in Corpus Christi, Texas. The seven-team single-elimination tournament consisted of three rounds based on seeding from regular season conference play. In a tournament which included three matches that were decided by penalty kicks, Lamar, the defending champions, won its fourth overall Southland Conference tournament championship and its second consecutive tournament championship in a 3-1 match vs #3 seed, McNeese.

== Media ==
All matches were broadcast on ESPN+.

== Seeding ==
Seven Southland Conference teams participated in the 2023 Tournament. Seeding was based on regular season conference records.

Seed	School	Conference Record	Points	Tie breaking
1	Lamar	9–0–1	28	No tie. Seeded based on overall points.
2	Texas A&M–Commerce	7–1–2	23	No tie. Seeded based on overall points.
3	McNeese	5–3–2	17	No tie. Seeded based on overall points.
4	Northwestern State	4–5–1	13	Head to head. 1–0–0 vs TAMU–CC. 1–0–0 vs SELU.
5	Texas A&M–Corpus Christi	4–5–1	13	Head to head. 1–0–0 vs SELU.
6	Southeastern Louisiana	4–5–1	13	Head to head. 0–0–1 vs TAMU–CC.
7	Houston Christian	4–6–0	12	No tie. Seeded based on overall points.

== Bracket ==
First Round; Wednesday, November 1
4	Northwestern State (pen.)	1 (4)
5	Texas A&M–Corpus Christi	1 (3)
2	Texas A&M–Commerce	1
7	Houston Christian	2
3	McNeese (pen.)	1 (4)
6	Southeastern Louisiana	1 (3)

Semifinals; Friday, November 3
1	Lamar (pen.)	1 (5)
4	Northwestern State	1 (4)
3	McNeese	1
7	Houston Christian	0

Final; Sunday, November 5
1	Lamar	3
3	McNeese	1

== Schedule ==
=== First Round ===
November 1, 2023	#3 McNeese	1–1 (a.e.t.) (4–3 p)	#6 Southeastern Louisiana	Corpus Christi, TX
1:00 pm	Kaile Kukaua 4' (yellow card) 54'	Report	Nicole O'Neill 52'; Skye Kennedy (yellow card) 62'; Emma Jones (yellow card) 71'	Stadium: Dr. Jack Dugan Soccer & Track Stadium; Attendance: 93; Referee: Trevor Rappleye; Assistant referees: Shawn Mire; Emily Donahue; Fourth official: Derek Smolik

November 1, 2023	#2 Texas A&M–Commerce	1–2	#7 Houston Christian	Corpus Christi, TX
4:00 pm	Melissa Storey 53'	Report	Katie Marker 8'; Ryan Ford 50'; Emily Jaimes (yellow card) 72'; Lauren Avila (yellow card) 72'	Stadium: Dr. Jack Dugan Soccer & Track Stadium; Attendance: 119; Referee: Arturo Ibarra; Assistant referees: Bernardo an Steenberghe; Muhammad Kaleia; Fourth official: Seun Yinka-Kehinde

November 1, 2023	#4 Northwestern State	1–1 (a.e.t.) (4–3 p)	#5 Texas A&M–Corpus Christi	Corpus Christi, TX
7:00 pm	Mai-Lisa Atis 47'; Alina Graf (yellow card) 47'	Report	Emme' Fernandez 68'; Reese Cross (yellow card) 55'; Maggie Murray (yellow card) 104'	Stadium: Dr. Jack Dugan Soccer & Track Stadium; Attendance: 238; Referee: Seun Yinka-Kehinde; Assistant referees: Fevzi Demirhan; Christopher Luna; Fourth official: Arturo Ibarra

=== Semifinals ===
November 3, 2023	#3 McNeese	1–0	#7 Houston Christian	Corpus Christi, TX
4:00 pm	Morgan Schooley 46' (yellow card) 37'; Kaile Kukaua (yellow card) 71'	Report	Mia Salas (yellow card) 68'	Stadium: Dr. Jack Dugan Soccer & Track Stadium; Attendance: 129; Referee: Muhammad Kaleia; Assistant referees: Arturo Ibarra; Fevzi Demirhan; Fourth official: Seun Yinka-Kehinde

November 3, 2023	#1 Lamar	1–1 (a.e.t.) (5–4 p)	#4 Northwestern State	Corpus Christi, TX
7:00 pm	Cariel Ellis 57'; Kaisa Juvonen (yellow card) 42'; Riley Wilson (yellow card) 106'; Caragan Childs (yellow card) 106'	Report	Sabrina Lopez 88'	Stadium: Dr. Jack Dugan Soccer & Track Stadium; Attendance: 141; Referee: Jennifer Dumaine; Assistant referees: Jorge Perez; Christopher Luna; Fourth official: Bernardo Van Steenberghe

=== Final ===
November 5, 2023	#1 Lamar	3–1	#3 McNeese	Corpus Christi, TX
1:00 pm	Arely Alaniz 27'; Trinity Clark 59'; Eva Karen 63'; Riley Wilson (yellow card) 60'	Report	Kiana Kukaua 60'	Stadium: Dr. Jack Dugan Soccer & Track Stadium; Attendance: 177; Referee: Fevzi Demirhan; Assistant referees: Seun Yinka-Kehinde; Jennifer Dumaine; Fourth official: Christopher Luna

== All-Tournament team ==
Player	Team
**Arely Alaniz**	Lamar
Cariel Ellis	Lamar
Trinity Clark	Lamar
Hollie Massey	Lamar
Riley Wilson	Lamar
Jackie Kelly	McNeese
Kiana Kukaua	McNeese
Kaile Kukaua	McNeese
Morgan Schooley	McNeese
Lauren Avilla	Houston Christian
Caroline Hilliard	Northwestern State

MVP in bold
