= 2022 Southland Conference women's soccer tournament =

- Classification: Division I
- Teams: 7
- Matches: 6
- Attendance: 717
- Site: Lady Demon Soccer Complex; Natchitoches, Louisiana
- Champions: Lamar (3 title)
- Winning coach: Nathan Kogut (1 title)
- MVP: Christine Kitaru (Lamar)
- Broadcast: ESPN+

2022 Southland Conference women's soccer standings
	Conf.						Overall
Team	W		L		T	PCT	W		L		T	PCT
Lamar ‍†‍‡‍^{y}	10	–	1	–	1	.875	15	–	2	–	2	.842
Northwestern St ‍‍‍	8	–	2	–	2	.750	12	–	4	–	3	.711
Texas A&M-Commerce* ‍‍‍	7	–	4	–	1	.625	9	–	9	–	2	.500
Houston Christian ‍‍‍	6	–	5	–	1	.542	7	–	10	–	3	.425
SE Louisiana ‍‍‍	5	–	4	–	3	.542	7	–	7	–	3	.500
Texas A&M-CC ‍‍‍	5	–	6	–	1	.458	8	–	9	–	1	.472
McNeese ‍‍‍	3	–	5	–	4	.417	5	–	9	–	4	.389
Incarnate Word ‍‍‍	2	–	7	–	3	.292	3	–	10	–	3	.281
Nicholls ‍‍‍	0	–	11	–	0	.000	2	–	15	–	1	.139
† – Conference champion ‡ – 2022 Southland Tournament champion y – Invited to the NCAA Tournament: Texas A&M–Commerce ineligible for postseason NCAA Championship play due to transition from NCAA Division II As of December 6, 2022 Rankings from United Soccer Coaches Poll Source:Southland Conference

The 2022 Southland Conference women's soccer tournament, the postseason women's soccer tournament for the Southland Conference, was held from November 2 to November 6, 2022. The six-match tournament took place at the Lady Demon Soccer Complex in Natchitoches, Louisiana. The seven-team single-elimination tournament consisted of three rounds based on seeding from regular season conference play. The defending champions were the Northwestern State Lady Demons. Northwestern State was defeated in the semifinal round by Texas A&M-Commerce Lions 2–3. Lamar Lady Cardinals won the championship by defeating the Houston Christian Huskies 1–0 in the semifinal round and Texas A&M-Commerce 4–1 in the championship final match. The Lady Cardinals qualified for the Southland Conference's autobid to the 2022 NCAA Division I women's soccer tournament. The championship win was Lamar's third in the conference.

== Seeding ==
Seven Southland Conference teams participated in the 2022 Tournament. Seeding was based on regular season conference records.

Seed	School	Conference Record	Points
1	Lamar	10–1–1	31
2	Northwestern State	8–2–2	26
3	Texas A&M–Commerce	7–4–1	22
4	Houston Christian	6–5–1	19
5	Southeastern	5–4–3	18
6	Texas A&M–Corpus Christi	5–6–1	16
7	McNeese	3–5–4	13

== Bracket ==
First Round; Wednesday, November 2
4	Houston Christian (a.e.t.)	1
5	Southeastern	0
3	Texas A&M–Commerce	2
6	Texas A&M–Corpus Christi	1
2	Northwestern State	5
7	McNeese	0

Semifinals; Friday, November 4
1	Lamar	1
4	Houston Christian	0
3	Texas A&M–Commerce (a.e.t.)	3
2	Northwestern State	2

Final; Sunday, November 6
1	Lamar	4
3	Texas A&M–Commerce	1

== Schedule ==
=== First Round ===
November 2, 2022	#4 Houston Christian	1–0 (a.e.t.)	#5 Southeastern	Natchitoches, LA
1:00 p.m. CT	Alexa Huerta 103'			Stadium: Lady Demon Soccer Complex; Attendance: 84; Referee: Fevzi Demirhan; Assistant referees: Bernardo Van Steenberghe; Christopher Luna; Fourth official: Seun (Shay) Yinka-Kehinde

November 2, 2022	#3 Texas A&M-Commerce	2–1	#6 Texas A&M-Corpus Christi	Natchitoches, LA
4:00 p.m. CT	Ashley Campuzano 36'; Mya Mitchell 51'		Morgan Westbury 46'	Stadium: Lady Demon Soccer Complex; Attendance: 75; Referee: Seun Yinka-Kehnde; Assistant referees: Jennifer Dumaine; Arturo Ibarra; Fourth official: Alex DeRosing

November 2, 2022	#2 Northwestern State	5–0	#7 McNeese	Natchitoches, LA
7:00 p.m. CT	Hallie Field 8'; Olivia Draguicevich 47'; Gracie Armstrong 52' 54'; Paige Armstrong 71'			Stadium: Lady Demon Soccer Complex; Attendance: 178; Referee: Alex DeRostaing; Assistant referees: Fevzi Demirhan; Bernardo Van Steenberghe; Fourth official: Jennifer Dymaine

=== Semifinals ===
November 4, 2022	#1 Lamar	1–0	#4 Houston Christian	Natchitoches, LA
11:00 a.m. CT	Laura Linares 33'; Christine Kitaru (yellow card) 26'		Mia Salas (yellow card) 62'; Kat Lazor (yellow card) 70'	Stadium: Lady Demon Soccer Complex; Attendance: 100; Referee: Jennifer Dumaine; Assistant referees: Bernardo Van Steenberghe; Chris Luna; Fourth official: Alex DeRostaing

November 4, 2022	#3 Texas A&M-Commerce	3–2 (a.e.t.)	#2 Northwestern State	Natchitoches, LA
2:00 p.m. CT	Gracie Armstrong 29' 78'; Halie Griffin (yellow card) 65'		65' Mindy Shoffit; 68' Ashley Campuzano; 104' Lauren Shaw; (yellow card) 87' Kaitlyn Valaitis	Stadium: Lady Demon Soccer Complex; Attendance: 150; Referee: Arturo Ibarra; Assistant referees: Fevzi Demirhan; Seun Yinka-kehinde; Fourth official: Bernardo Van Steenberghe

=== Final ===
November 6, 2022	#1 Lamar	4–1	#3 Texas A&M-Commerce	Natchitoches, LA
1:00 p.m. CT	Christine Kitaru 31' 76'; Cariel Ellis 56' 87'		19' Mindy Shoffit (yellow card) 66'	Stadium: Lady Demon Soccer Complex; Attendance: 130; Referee: Alex DeRostaing; Assistant referees: Jennifer Dumaine; Chris Luna; Fourth official: Shay Yinka Kehinde

== All-Tournament team ==
Player	Team
**Christine Kitaru**	Lamar
Laura Linares	Lamar
Cariel Ellis	Lamar
Abbey Gemza	Lamar
Nicole Panis	Lamar
Ashley Campuzano	Texas A&M-Commerce
Mya Mitchell	Texas A&M-Commerce
Mindy Shoffit	Texas A&M-Commerce
Jen Peters	Texas A&M-Commerce
Gracie Armstrong	Northwestern State
Kat Lazor	Houston Christian

MVP in bold
