= 2018 Southland Conference women's soccer tournament =

- Classification: Division I
- Teams: 8
- Matches: 7
- Attendance: 1,117
- Site: Lamar Soccer Complex; Beaumont, Texas
- Champions: Abilene Christian (1st title)
- Winning coach: Casey Wilson (1st title)
- MVP: Shay Johnson (Abilene Christian)
- Broadcast: Southland Digital Network; ESPN+ (Final)

2018 Southland Conference women's soccer standings
	Conf.						Overall
Team	W		L		T	PCT	W		L		T	PCT
Cent. Arkansas ‍†‍‍	10	–	1	–	0	.909	16	–	4	–	1	.786
Houston Baptist ‍‍‍	8	–	2	–	1	.773	10	–	8	–	1	.553
Lamar ‍‍‍	7	–	2	–	2	.727	12	–	6	–	2	.650
Abilene Christian ‍‍‡‍	7	–	3	–	1	.682	15	–	6	–	1	.705
McNeese St ‍‍‍	7	–	3	–	1	.682	13	–	7	–	1	.643
SE Louisiana ‍‍‍	4	–	4	–	3	.500	7	–	7	–	4	.500
Northwestern St ‍‍‍	4	–	7	–	0	.364	10	–	10	–	0	.500
Stephen F. Austin ‍‍‍	3	–	5	–	3	.409	7	–	9	–	3	.447
Incarnate Word ‍‍‍	3	–	7	–	1	.318	3	–	12	–	1	.219
Texas A&M-CC ‍‍‍	2	–	7	–	2	.273	5	–	9	–	3	.382
Sam Houston St ‍‍‍	2	–	7	–	2	.273	3	–	12	–	3	.250
Nicholls St ‍‍‍	1	–	10	–	0	.091	3	–	15	–	0	.167
† – Conference champion ‡ – 2018 Southland Tournament champion y – Invited to the NCAA tournament As of November 14, 2018; Rankings from United Soccer Coaches Poll; Source:Southland Conference

The 2018 Southland Conference women's soccer tournament, the postseason women's soccer tournament for the Southland Conference, was held from October 31–November 4, 2018. The seven-match tournament took place at the Lamar Soccer Complex in Beaumont, Texas. The eight-team single-elimination tournament consisted of three rounds based on seeding from regular season conference play.

== Media and TV ==
Broadcast of the quarterfinal and semifinal rounds were on the Southland Conference Digital Network. The championship game was broadcast on ESPN+

== Bracket ==
Quarterfinals; Wednesday, Oct. 31; SLC Digital
1	Central Arkansas	5
8	Northwestern State	2
4	McNeese State	1
5	Abilene Christian	3
2	Houston Baptist	0
7	Stephen F. Austin	1
3	Lamar	3
6	Southeastern Louisiana	2

Semifinals; Friday, Nov. 2 SLC Digital
1	Central Arkansas	0
5	Abilene Christian	1
7	Stephen F. Austin	2
3	Lamar	1

Final; Sunday, Nov. 4 ESPN+
5	Abilene Christian	3
7	Stephen F. Austin	1

== Schedule ==
=== Quarterfinals ===
October 31, 2018	#1 Central Arkansas	5–2	#8 Northwestern State State	Beaumont, Texas
11:00 a.m. CDT	15' Camille Bassett; 33' Morgan Rowlow; 40' Gracie Hair; 52' Connie Awuku-Darkoh; 62' Lauren Hargus		46' Hallie McCarroll; 61' Brittany Caserma	Stadium: Lamar Soccer Complex; Attendance: 101; Referee: Mark Herrington; Assistant referees: Ken Mizuno; Fev Demirhan; Fourth official: Tom Harlett

October 31, 2018	#4 McNeese State	1–3	#5 Abilene Christian	Beaumont, Texas
2:00 p.m. CDT	61' (Assist: Rachel Palet) Keely Morrow		17' (Assist: Dylan Owens) Shay Johnson; 58' (Assist: Sophie Standifer) Caity Acosta; 63' Chelsea Reedy	Stadium: Lamar Soccer Complex; Attendance: 97; Referee: Matt Thompson; Assistant referees: Diego Blas; Ruben Campillo; Fourth official: Tom Harlett

October 31, 2018	#2 Houston Baptist	0–1	#7 Stephen F. Austin	Beaumont, Texas
5:00 p.m. CDT			87' (Assist: Breanna Moore) Katelyn Termini	Stadium: Lamar Soccer Complex; Attendance: 89; Referee: Brandon Gardner; Assistant referees: Fev Demirhan; Ruben Campillo; Fourth official: Matt Thompson

October 31, 2018	#3 Lamar	3–2	#6 Southeastern Louisiana	Beaumont, Texas
8:00 p.m. CDT	25' Anna Loftus; 54' Southeastern Louisiana Own Goal; 66' Madison Ledet	Report	30' Lamar Own Goal; 49' Christina Cutura	Stadium: Lamar Soccer Complex; Attendance: 127; Referee: Tom Harlett; Assistant referees: Ken Mizuno; Diego Blas; Fourth official: Brandon Gardner

=== Semifinals ===
November 2, 2018	#1 Central Arkansas	0–1	#5 Abilene Christian	Beaumont, Texas
4:00 p.m. CDT			75' (Assist: Brittney Harris, Ashley Stamps) Shay Johnson	Stadium: Lamar Soccer Complex; Attendance: 75; Referee: Travis Haight; Assistant referees: Fevzi Demirhan; Diego Blas; Fourth official: Ken Mizuno

November 2, 2018	#7 Stephen F. Austin	2–1	#3 Lamar	Beaumont, Texas
7:00 p.m. CDT	20' Katelyn Termini; 82' (Assist: Sophia Fondren) Carli Arthurs		31' (Assist: Lucy Ashworth) Kelso Peskin	Stadium: Lamar Soccer Complex; Attendance: 405; Referee: Matthew Thompson; Assistant referees: Jeremy Weed; Mark Herrington; Fourth official: Travis Haight

=== Final ===
November 4, 2018	# 5 Abilene Christian	3–1	#7 Stephen F. Austin	Beaumont, Texas
1:05 p.m. CST	31' (Assist: Samantha Vestal) Christina Arteaga; 35' Caity Acosta; 59' Christina Arteaga		72' (Assist: Teia Haynes, Breanna Moore) Katie Jennings	Stadium: Lamar Soccer Complex; Attendance: 223; Referee: Brandon Gardner; Assistant referees: Ken Minuzo; Fev Derminhan; Fourth official: Matthew Thompson

== Statistics ==
=== Goalscorers ===
2 Goals

- Caity Acosta – Abilene Christian
- Christina Arteaga – Abilene Christian
- Shay Johnson – Abilene Christian
- Kateyln Termini – Stephen F. Austin

1 Goal

- Connie Awuku-Darkoh – Central Arkansas
- Camille Bassett – Central Arkansas
- Brittany Caserma – Northwestern State
- Christina Cutura – Southeastern Louisiana
- Gracie Hair – Central Arkansas
- Lauren Hargus – Central Arkansas
- Katie Jennings – Stephen F. Austin
- Madison Ledet – Lamar
- Anna Loftus – Lamar
- Hallie McCarroll – Northwestern State
- Keely Morrow – McNeese State
- Kelso Peskin – Lamar
- Chelsea Reedy – Abilene Christian
- Morgan Rowlow – Central Arkansas

Own Goals

- Lamar vs. Southeastern Louisiana
- Southeastern Louisiana vs. Lamar

== Awards and honors ==
Source: Tournament MVP: Shay Johnson – Abilene Christian
All-Tournament team:

- Caity Acosta, Abilene Christian
- Christiana Arteaga, Abilene Christian
- Michelle Mulrooney, Abilene Christian
- Carli Arthurs, Stephen F. Austin
- Sophie Fondren, Stephen F. Austin
- Madison Ledet, Lamar
- Sophia Manibo, Lamar
- Camille Bassett, Central Arkansas
- Lauren Mercuri, Central Arkansas
