= 2020 Southland Conference women's soccer tournament =

- Classification: Division I
- Teams: 8
- Matches: 7
- Attendance: 525
- Site: Lamar Soccer Complex; Beaumont, Texas
- Champions: Southeastern (4th title)
- Winning coach: Christopher McBride (1st title)
- MVP: Nadine Maher (Southeastern)
- Broadcast: ESPN+

2020 Southland Conference women's soccer standings
	Conf.						Overall
Team	W		L		T	PCT	W		L		T	PCT
Stephen F. Austin ‍†‍‍	10	–	6	–	3	.605	8	–	3	–	0	.727
Northwestern State ‍‍‍	7	–	3	–	1	.682	9	–	3	–	2	.714
Abilene Christian ‍‍‍	7	–	3	–	1	.682	12	–	6	–	2	.650
Lamar ‍‍‍	7	–	3	–	0	.700	8	–	4	–	0	.667
Southeastern Louisiana ‍‍‡‍^{y}	6	–	2	–	3	.682	8	–	3	–	4	.667
Incarnate Word ‍‍‍	5	–	3	–	3	.591	6	–	5	–	3	.536
Sam Houston ‍‍‍	5	–	5	–	1	.500	7	–	6	–	1	.536
Texas A&M–Corpus Christi ‍‍‍	3	–	5	–	3	.409	4	–	8	–	5	.382
McNeese State ‍‍‍	3	–	6	–	1	.350	3	–	7	–	1	.318
Central Arkansas ‍‍‍	3	–	7	–	1	.318	12	–	9	–	2	.565
Houston Baptist ‍‍‍	3	–	7	–	1	.318	3	–	10	–	2	.267
Nicholls ‍‍‍	0	–	10	–	1	.045	0	–	15	–	1	.031
† – Conference champion ‡ – 2020 Southland Tournament champion y – Invited to the NCAA tournament As of May 17, 2021; Rankings from United Soccer Coaches Poll; Source:Southland Conference

The 2020 Southland Conference women's soccer tournament, the postseason women's soccer tournament for the Southland Conference, was postponed from late 2020 until April 13 to April 17, 2021 due to the COVID-19 pandemic. The seven-match tournament took place at the Lamar Soccer Complex in Beaumont, Texas. The eight-team single-elimination tournament consisted of three rounds based on seeding from regular season conference play. The defending champions were the Lamar Lady Cardinals, but they were unable to defend their title falling in the first round to Sam Houston State 4–3. The Southeastern Lady Lions won the tournament, defeating Sam Houston 3–0 in the final.

Tournament attendance was restricted to 75 per match due to COVID-19 precautions.

== Media and TV ==
All matches were broadcast on ESPN+.

== Bracket ==
Quarterfinals; Tuesday, April 13; ESPN+
1	Stephen F. Austin	1 (4)
8	Texas A&M–Corpus Christi	1 (2)
4	Northwestern State	0 (3)
5	Southeastern	2 (4)
3	Abilene Christian	3
6	Incarnate Word	0
2	Lamar	3
7	Sam Houston	4

Semifinals; Thursday, April 15; ESPN+
1	Stephen F. Austin	0
5	Southeastern	2
3	Abilene Christian	0
7	Sam Houston	1

Final; Saturday, April 17; ESPN+
5	Southeastern	3
7	Sam Houston	0

== Schedule ==
=== Quarterfinals ===
April 13, 2021	#1 Stephen F. Austin	1–1 (a.e.t.) (4–2 p)	#8 Texas A&M-Corpus Christi	Beaumont, TX
11:00 a.m. CST	Natalie Gonzalez 87'	Report	8' Katelyn Termini	Stadium: Lamar Soccer Complex; Attendance: 75; Referee: Elvis Osmanobic; Assistant referees: Ricardo Ocampo; Ruben Campillo; Fourth official: Brandon Gardner

April 13, 2021	#4 Northwestern State	0–0 SLU advances 4-3 on PKs (a.e.t.) (4–3 p)	#5 Southeastern	Beaumont, TX
2:00 p.m. CST		Report		Stadium: Lamar Soccer Complex; Attendance: 75; Referee: Brandon Gardner; Assistant referees: George Kubove; Fezvi Demirhan; Fourth official: Elvis Osmanobic

April 13, 2021	#3 Abilene Christian	3–0	#6 Incarnate Word	Beaumont, TX
5:00 p.m. CST	Natalie Jones 14', 68'; Caylen Wright 44'	Report		Stadium: Lamar Soccer Complex; Attendance: 75; Referee: Matthew Thompson; Assistant referees: Ruben Campillo; Ricardo Ocampo; Fourth official: Kaitlyn Trowbridge

April 13, 2021	#2 Lamar	3–4	#7 Sam Houston	Beaumont, TX
8:00 p.m. CST	Esther Okoronkwo 22'; o.g.'; Kristine Kitaru 51'	Report	51' Landri Townsend; 87' Danielle Forsyth; 89' Brooke Jones; 98' Courtney Pawlik	Stadium: Lamar Soccer Complex; Attendance: 75; Referee: Arturo Ibarra; Assistant referees: Kaitlyn Trowbridge; George Kubrove; Fourth official: Fevzi Demirhan

=== Semifinals ===
April 15, 2021	#1 Stephen F. Austin	0–2	#5 Southeastern	Beaumont, TX
4:00 p.m. CST		Report	32' Ellie Warden; 72' Hailie Yoder	Stadium: Lamar Soccer Complex; Attendance: 75; Referee: Matthew Thompson; Assistant referees: Ruben Campillo; Ricardo Ocampo; Fourth official: Aturo Ibarra

April 15, 2021	#3 Abilene Christian	0–1	#7 Sam Houston	Beaumont, TX
7:00 p.m. CST		Report	52' Grace Stine	Stadium: Lamar Soccer Complex; Attendance: 75; Referee: Fevzi Demirhan; Assistant referees: George Kubove; Estefania Estrada; Fourth official: Brandon Gardner

=== Final ===
April 17, 2021	#5 Southeastern	3–0	#7 Sam Houston	Beaumont, TX
1:05 p.m. CST	Jamie Raines 12', 62'; Hailie Yoder 66'	Report		Stadium: Lamar Soccer Complex; Attendance: 75; Referee: Arturo Ibarra; Assistant referees: Ricardo Ocampo; George Kubove; Fourth official: Melvin Rivas

== All-Tournament team ==
Player	Team
**Nadine Maher**	Southeastern
Megan Gordon	Southeastern
Dalton Fish	Southeastern
Hailie Yoder	Southeastern
Courtney Pawlik	Sam Houston
Danielle Forsyth	Sam Houston
Brooke Jones	Sam Houston
Katelyn Termini	Stephen F. Austin
Maddie Talbot	Stephen F. Austin
Christina Arteaga	Abilene Christian
Natalie Jones	Abilene Christian

MVP in bold
