= Steve Holeman =

American soccer coach

Personal information
- Full name: Steve Holeman
- Date of birth: December 21, 1967 (age 58)
- Place of birth: West Long Branch, New Jersey
- Position: Midfielder

Team information
- Current team: Texas State (head coach)

College career
Years	Team	Apps	(Gls)
1987–1990	Wake Forest Demon Deacons		

Managerial career
- 1991: Huntsville, Alabama under–17 select boys team
- 1992–1994: Auburn University men's club team
- 1993: Auburn Tigers women's team (Interim Head Coach)
- 1994–2009: Ole Miss Rebels women's team
- 2010–2014: Georgia Lady Bulldogs
- 2016–2021: Lamar Lady Cardinals
- 2022–: Texas State Bobcats

Steve Holeman (born December 21, 1967) is an American soccer coach who is currently serving as the women's head coach at Texas State University, an NCAA Division I program in the Pac 12 Conference. He was named Texas State head coach on February 9, 2022. Prior to his position at Texas State, Holeman served as head coach at three Southeastern Conference universities starting the program at two of those universities. He started the soccer program at Auburn serving as an interim head coach for one season (1993). He moved to Ole Miss starting the women's soccer program there and served as head coach for fifteen seasons (1994–2010). He moved to another Southeastern Conference university, Georgia serving as the Lady Bulldogs head coach for five seasons (2011–2015). He served as head coach at Lamar University from 2016 to 2021.

== Player ==
Holeman was a member of the Wake Forest Demon Deacons men's soccer team playing midfielder from 1987 to 1990. He was a letter winner all four seasons and helped guide his team to three NCAA tournaments and the 1989 ACC tournament title.

== Coaching career ==
Prior to assuming the Lamar Lady Cardinals soccer team head coach position, Holeman served at three Southeastern Conference universities as head coach starting the women's soccer program at two of the universities.

=== Huntsville, Alabama ===
Holeman coached the Huntsville, Alabama under-17 select boys team in 1991 to a state championship.

=== Auburn ===
Holeman started the Auburn Tigers women's soccer team in 1993 serving as interim head coach. His team had a 7–6–3 record in its first season. In addition to his 1993 interim head coaching position, he also coached the Auburn men's club team from 1992 to 1994.

=== Ole Miss ===
Holeman was hired as head coach for the Ole Miss Rebels women's soccer team in 1994 starting that program. He served as head coach from 1994 to 2009 building a record of 159–119–28 overall and 62–62–19 in Southeastern Conference play. His Ole Miss Rebels teams had four NCAA Tournament appearances (2002, 2003, 2005, and 2009).

=== Georgia ===
On April 16, 2010, Ole Miss announced that Holeman had accepted the head coaching position for the Georgia Lady Bulldogs soccer team. He was head coach for the Georgia Lady Bulldogs soccer team from 2010 to 2014. He accumulated a record of 53–39–11 overall and 24–24–1 in conference play while at Georgia. His Georgia Lady Bulldog teams had two NCAA tournament appearances (2011 and 2014). His team lost in the first round of the 2017 NCAA Division I Women's Soccer Tournament.

=== Lamar ===
Holeman was named head coach on January 12, 2016. He led the Lamar Lady Cardinals to their first Southland Conference regular season championship, first Southland Conference tournament championship, and first NCAA Division I Women's Soccer Tournament appearance in 2017, his second season with the program. Holeman was named Southland Conference women's soccer coach of the year in 2017. He "... turned his team around from last place to first place in one season – a feat that had never been accomplished in Southland soccer history and only four times in any league sport." While at Lamar, his teams won 2 Southland Conference regular season championships in 2017 and 2019, 2 Southland Conference tournament championships in 2017 and 2019, 1 conference second-place finish in 2020, and appeared in the NCAA Division I Women's Soccer Tournament 2 times, 2017 and 2019. In the Western Athletic Conference, his team was division runner-up in the Southwest Division 2021 regular season.

== NCAA Division I head coaching record ==
Record table
Season	Team	Overall	Conference	Standing	Postseason
Auburn Tigers (Southeastern Conference) (1993–1993)
1993	Auburn	7–6–3	0–2	4th	
Auburn:		7–6–3 (.531)	0–2–0 (.000)		
Ole Miss Rebels (Southeastern Conference) (1995–2010)
1995	Ole Miss	6–12–0	0–8–0	6th West Division	
1996	Ole Miss	9–9–1	1–7–0	6th West Division	
1997	Ole Miss	11–9–0	4–4–0	3rd West Division	SEC Tournament, 1st round
1998	Ole Miss	9–7–2	3–5–0	2nd West Division	SEC Tournament, 1st round
1999	Ole Miss	14–9–0	4–5–0	1st West Division	SEC Tournament, Championship game
2000	Ole Miss	13–6–1	5–3–1	1st West Division	SEC Tournament, 1st round
2001	Ole Miss	10–10–1	4–5–0	3rd West Division	SEC Tournament, Semifinals
2002	Ole Miss	13–5–2	4–3–2	2nd West Division	SEC Tournament, 1st round, NCAA Tournament, 1st round
2003	Ole Miss	15–6–2	4–3–2	2nd West Division	SEC Tournament, Semifinals, NCAA Tournament, 2nd round
2004	Ole Miss	9–10–2	4–5–2	4th West Division	SEC Tournament, Semifinals
2005	Ole Miss	14–5–2	8–1–2	1st West Division	SEC Tournament, 1st round, NCAA Tournament, 1st round
2006	Ole Miss	8–7–5	4–2–5	2nd West Division	SEC Tournament, 1st round
2007	Ole Miss	7–8–5	4–4–3	3rd West Division	SEC Tournament, 1st round
2008	Ole Miss	7–10–3	5–5–1	3rd West Division	SEC Tournament, 1st round
2009	Ole Miss	13–6–2	7–7–2	2nd West Division	SEC Tournament, 1st round, NCAA Tournament, 1st round
Ole Miss:		158–119–28 (.564)	62–62–19 (.500)		
Georgia Lady Bulldogs (Southland Conference) (2001–2006)
2010	Georgia	11–6–4	5–3–3	4th East Division	
2011	Georgia	13–7–2	6–3–2	4th East Division	NCAA Tournament, 2nd round
2012	Georgia	7–11–2	3–8–2	6th East Division	
2013	Georgia	12–7–1	5–5–1	Tied 6th overall	
2014	Georgia	10–8–2	5–5–1	8th overall	NCAA Tournament, 1st round
Georgia:		53–39–11 (.568)	24–24–9 (.500)		
Lamar Lady Cardinals (Southland Conference) (2016–2020)
2016	Lamar	2–14–3	1–7–3	12th	
2017	Lamar	18–4–1	10–1–0	1st	Regular Season Champion, SLC Tournament Champion, NCAA Tournament, 1st round
2018	Lamar	12–6–2	7–2–2	3rd	Conference tournament semi–finals
2019	Lamar	16–7–0	10–1–0	1st	Regular Season Champion, SLC Tournament Champion, NCAA Tournament, 1st round
2020	Lamar	12–8–4	7–3–0	2nd	Conference tournament 1st round
Lamar Lady Cardinals (Western Athletic Conference) (2021–2021)
2021	Lamar	10–8–2	6–2–2	2nd, Southwest Division	Conference tournament semi–finals
Lamar:		58–39–8 (.590)	34–13–7 (.694)		
Texas State Bobcats (Sun Belt Conference) (2022–present)
2022	Texas State	0–0–0	0–0–0		
Texas State:		0–0–0 (–)	0–0–0 (–)		
Total:		276–203–50 (.569)			
National champion Postseason invitational champion Conference regular season champion Conference regular season and conference tournament champion Division regular season champion Division regular season and conference tournament champion Conference tournament champion

(Won/loss records reflect results of games through November 5, 2021.)
