= 2021 WAC women's soccer tournament =

- Classification: Division I
- Teams: 6
- Matches: 5
- Site: Elmer Gray Stadium; Abilene, TX
- Champions: Grand Canyon (1st title)
- Winning coach: Chris Cissell (1st title)
- MVP: Lindsey Prokop (Grand Canyon)
- Broadcast: ESPN+

2021 WAC women's soccer standings
	Conf.						Overall
Team	W		L		T	PCT	W		L		T	PCT
Southwest
Stephen F. Austin ‍†‍‍	8	–	2	–	0	.800	10	–	8	–	1	.553
Lamar ‍‍‍	6	–	2	–	2	.700	10	–	8	–	2	.550
Sam Houston State ‍‍‍	6	–	4	–	0	.600	8	–	10	–	0	.444
Abilene Christian ‍‍‍	4	–	5	–	1	.450	6	–	9	–	1	.406
Texas–Rio Grande Valley ‍‍‍	2	–	7	–	1	.250	6	–	12	–	2	.350
Chicago State ‍‍‍	2	–	8	–	0	.200	2	–	14	–	1	.147
West
Grand Canyon ‍†‍‡‍^{y}	7	–	1	–	2	.800	16	–	4	–	2	.773
Utah Valley ‍‍‍	6	–	2	–	2	.700	13	–	7	–	2	.636
New Mexico State ‍‍‍	5	–	5	–	0	.500	9	–	11	–	0	.450
California Baptist* ‍‍‍	4	–	4	–	2	.500	6	–	8	–	3	.441
Dixie State* ‍‍‍	2	–	7	–	1	.250	6	–	13	–	1	.325
Seattle ‍‍‍	1	–	6	–	3	.250	7	–	8	–	4	.474
† – Conference champion ‡ – 2021 WAC Tournament champion y – Invited to the NCAA Tournament * ineligible for the 2021 NCAA Tournament due to transition from Division II; As of December 7, 2021; Rankings from United Soccer Coaches Poll; Source:WAC

The 2021 Western Athletic Conference women's soccer tournament was the postseason women's soccer tournament for the Western Athletic Conference held from November 3 to November 7, 2021. The five-match tournament took place at Elmer Gray Stadium in Abilene, TX on the campus of Abilene Christian University. The six-team single-elimination tournament consisted of three rounds based on seeding from regular-season divisional conference play. The defending champions were the Utah Valley Wolverines. Utah Valley was unable to defend their crown, falling 3–0 against Grand Canyon in the final. This was Grand Canyon's first WAC Tournament victory in program history as well as the first victory for head coach Chris Cissell. As tournament champions, Grand Canyon earned the WAC's automatic bid to the NCAA Tournament.

== Seeding ==
The top three teams from each division qualified for the 2021 Tournament. Teams were seeded based on regular season conference records and the top seed from each conference earned a bye into the semifinal round. No tiebreakers were required as each of the top three teams in each conference finished with unique conference records.

Southwest Region
Finish	Team	Conference Record
1	Stephen F. Austin	8–2–0
2	Lamar	6–2–2
3	Sam Houston State	6–4–0

West Region
Finish	Team	Conference Record
1	Grand Canyon	7–1–2
2	Utah Valley	6–2–2
3	New Mexico State	5–5–0

== Bracket ==
First round Wednesday, Nov. 3
SW 2	Lamar	1
W 3	New Mexico State	0
W 2	Utah Valley	6
SW 3	Sam Houston	1

Semifinals; Friday, Nov. 5
W 1	Grand Canyon	2
SW 2	Lamar	1
SW 1	Stephen F. Austin	0
W 2	Utah Valley	1

Final; Sunday, Nov. 7
W 1	Grand Canyon	3
W 2	Utah Valley	0

== Matches ==
=== First round ===
November 3	SW #2 Lamar	1–0	W #3 New Mexico State	Abilene, TX
4:00 p.m.	Eva Karen 47'	Report		Stadium: Elmer Gray Stadium; Referee: Chris Greer; Assistant referees: Joel Mckell; Hans Soland; Fourth official: Aaron Donahoe

November 3	W #2 Utah Valley	6–1	SW #3 Sam Houston	Abilene, TX
7:00 p.m.	Nicole Olanda 9'; Sadie Brockbank 30', 65'; Breanna Eves 45'; Katie Haskins (yellow card) 65'; Amber Tripp 71'; Manthy Brady 77'	Report	54' Summer Knox	Stadium: Elmer Gray Stadium; Attendance: 58; Referee: Matthew Buckman; Assistant referees: Tony Obas; Habeeb Hooshmand; Fourth official: Gloria Martinez Resendiz

=== Semifinals ===
November 5 Semifinal 1	Grand Canyon	2–1	Lamar	Abilene, TX
	Marleen Schimmer 26'; Lindsey Prokop 79'	Report	52' Laura Linares	Stadium: Elmer Gray Stadium

November 5 Semifinal 2	Stephen F. Austin	0–1	Utah Valley	Abilene, TX
	Paige Kanipes (yellow card) 90'	Report	Katie Haskins 76'; Juliana Carter (yellow card) 90'	Stadium: Elmer Gray Stadium

=== Final ===
November 7	Grand Canyon	3–0	Utah Valley	Abilene, TX
	44' Lindsey Prokop; 70' Camryn Larson; 88' Dani Babb	Report	Sadie Brockbank (yellow card) 48' (red card)	Stadium: Elmer Gray Stadium

== Statistics ==
There were 15 goals scored in 5 matches, for an average of 3 goals per match.

2 goals

- (United States) Lindsey Prokop – Grand Canyon
- (United States) Sadie Brockbank – Utah Valley

1 goal

- (United States) Dani Babb – Grand Canyon
- (United States) Camryn Larson – Grand Canyon
- (Germany) Marleen Schimmer – Grand Canyon
- (Iceland) Eva Karen – Lamar
- (Spain) Laura Linares – Lamar
- (United States) Summer Knox – Sam Houston State
- (United States) Manthy Brady – Utah Valley
- (United States) Breanna Eves – Utah Valley
- (United States) Katie Haskins – Utah Valley
- (United States) Nicole Olanda – Utah Valley
- (United States) Amber Tripp – Utah Valley

== All-Tournament team ==
Player	Team
Sadie Brockbank	Utah Valley
Breanna Eves	Utah Valley
Amber Tripp	Utah Valley
Eva Karen	Lamar
Nicole Panis	Lamar
Dani Babb	Grand Canyon
Hannah Edwards	Grand Canyon
Jordan Ferguson	Grand Canyon
Camryn Larson	Grand Canyon
Marleen Schimmer	Grand Canyon
**Lindsey Prokop**	Grand Canyon

MVP in bold
