= South Alabama Soccer Complex =

Soccer complex in Mobile, Alabama

- "The Cage"
- Interactive map of South Alabama Soccer Complex
- Address: 6094 Old Shell Road. Mobile, AL; United States
- Coordinates: 30°41′31″N 88°10′58″W
- Owner: University of South Alabama
- Operator: USA Athletics
- Capacity: 1,000
- Type: Soccer-specific stadium

Construction
- Opened: 1994; 32 years ago
- Expanded: 2009

Tenant
- South Alabama Jaguars women's soccer (1994-present)

Website
- usajaguars.com/the-cage

The South Alabama Soccer Complex is a soccer complex located on the campus of the University of South Alabama campus in Mobile, Alabama. The facility is the home field of the South Alabama Jaguars women's soccer team.

The Cage hosted the Sun Belt Conference women's soccer tournament in 2000, 2002, 2005, 2007 and 2012. The complex has a capacity of 1,000 people.

== Expansion ==
In February 2009, the University of South Alabama Jaguars women's soccer team moved into its newly constructed complex, which features a head coach's office, two assistant coaches' offices, locker room, training room, equipment room, conference room, and a player lounge
