= East Texas A&M Lions women's soccer =

American college soccer team

- Founded: 1995; 31 years ago
- University: East Texas A&M University
- Head coach: Ashley Gordon (4th season)
- Conference: Southland
- Location: Commerce, Texas, US
- Stadium: Lion Soccer Field (capacity: 500)
- Nickname: Lions
- Colors: Blue and gold
Home	Away

NCAA tournament Quarterfinals
- 1999

NCAA tournament appearances
- 1999, 2003, 2004, 2008, 2013, 2014, 2015, 2016

Conference tournament championships
- 1999, 2004, 2014, 2015

Conference regular season championships
- 1999, 2003, 2008, 2014, 2016

For information on all East Texas A&M University sports, see East Texas A&M Lions

The East Texas A&M Lions women's soccer team (formerly the East Texas State Lions and the Texas A&M–Commerce Lions) is the women's intercollegiate soccer program representing East Texas A&M University. The school competes in the Southland Conference (SLC) in Division I of the National Collegiate Athletic Association (NCAA). For the first 27 years of existence, they competed in the Lone Star Conference of Division II. The East Texas A&M women's soccer team plays its home games at Lion Soccer Field on the university campus in Commerce, Texas. The Lions won four LSC regular season championships, three conference tournament titles, and made six appearances in the NCAA Division II Tournament. The team is currently coached by Ashley Gordon.

== History ==
Women's soccer has been a varsity sport at East Texas A&M since the 1995 season, when the school was still known as Texas A&M–Commerce and competed as an independent. The Lions subsequently began play as an LSC member when the conference began officially sponsoring the sport in 1996. During the first three years of the program's existence, Mike Munch led A&M–Commerce to two winning seasons and two appearances in the LSC semifinals, albeit no NCAA tournament appearances.

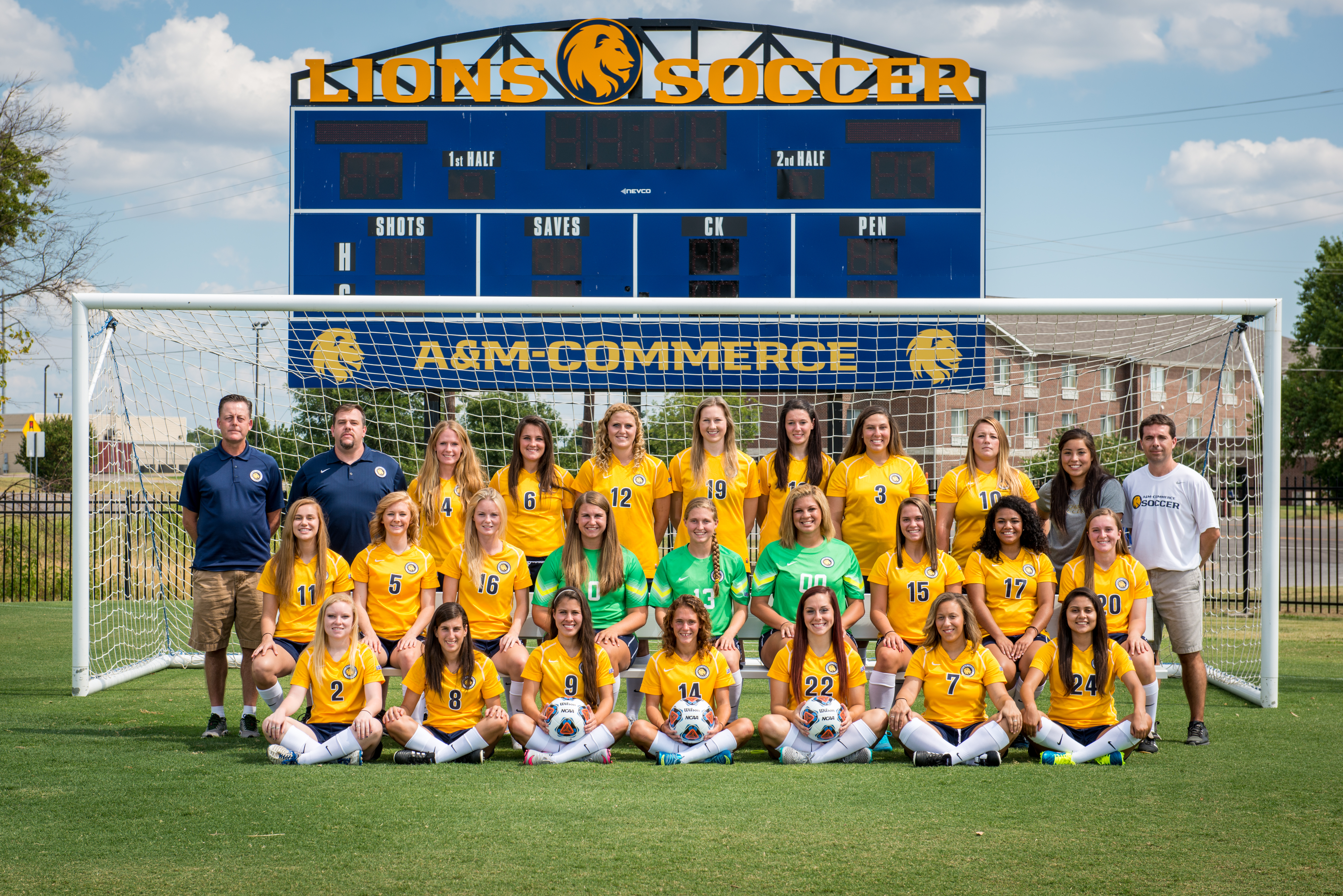
The 2015 team

Since beginning conference play, the Lions have won the LSC regular season title on five occasions (in 1999, 2003, 2014, and including co-championships in 2008 and 2016) and the tournament championship four times (in 1999, 2004, 2014, and 2015). East Texas A&M has also eight seven postseason appearances in the NCAA Division II Tournament, achieving their best result (an appearance in the Elite Eight) during their first campaign in 1999. The program has won all of its championships and made all of its NCAA postseason appearances during the tenure of Neil Piper, who served as head coach from 1998 to 2021.

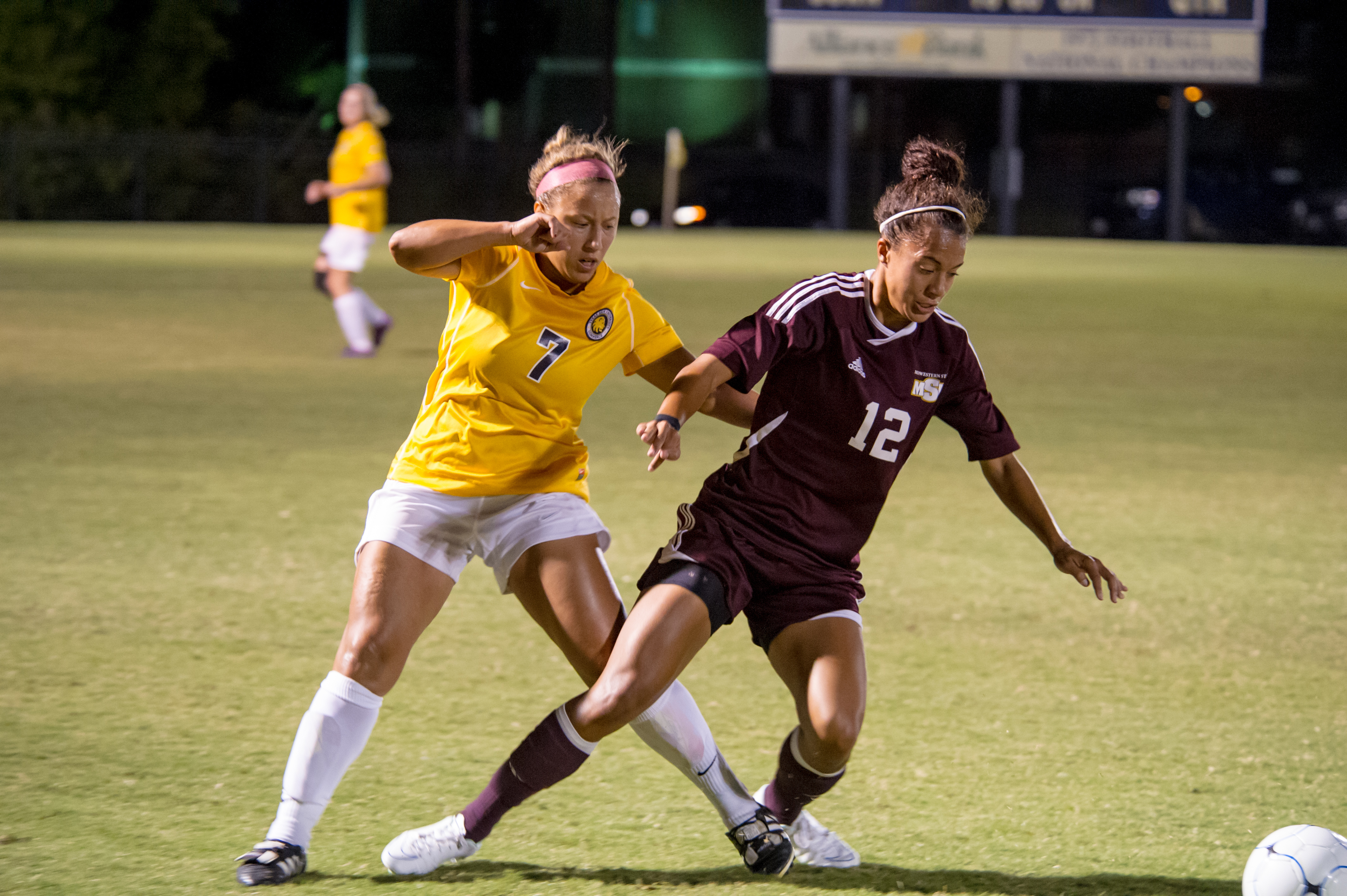
The Lions in action against the Midwestern State Mustangs in 2014

After the 2021 season, Piper announced his resignation on December 9, 2021. Ashley Gordon was hired as the program's third head coach on January 4, 2022. During their first season in the Southland, the Lions went 7-8-1 during the regular season, finishing third in the conference. In the conference tournament, they defeated the Texas A&M–Corpus Christi Islanders in the quarterfinal round, then shocked the Northwestern State Lady Demons in the semifinal round, before eventually falling to the Lamar Lady Cardinals in the Southland Conference Championship game. This gave them a 9-9-2 record in their first season as a Division I school.

During Gordon's second season, the Lions became the first East Texas A&M sports program to have an overall winning record in a season as a Division I team, going 9-7-3. They clinched the second seed in the Southland Conference Tournament, but were eliminated in the first round by the Houston Christian Huskies.

In 2024, the Lions endured their first losing season in the Division I era, but once again qualified for the Southland Conference Tournament. They defeated the Incarnate Word Cardinals 2-1 in the quarterfinals, then took down the Texas A&M–Corpus Christi Islanders 2-1 in the semifinals, before losing to the SFA Ladyjacks 2-0 in the championship game.

The 2025 season saw the Lions endure another losing season, but they finished fourth in the Southland Conference standings. In the conference tournament, they were eliminated in the quarterfinals by Houston Christian.

=== All-time record ===
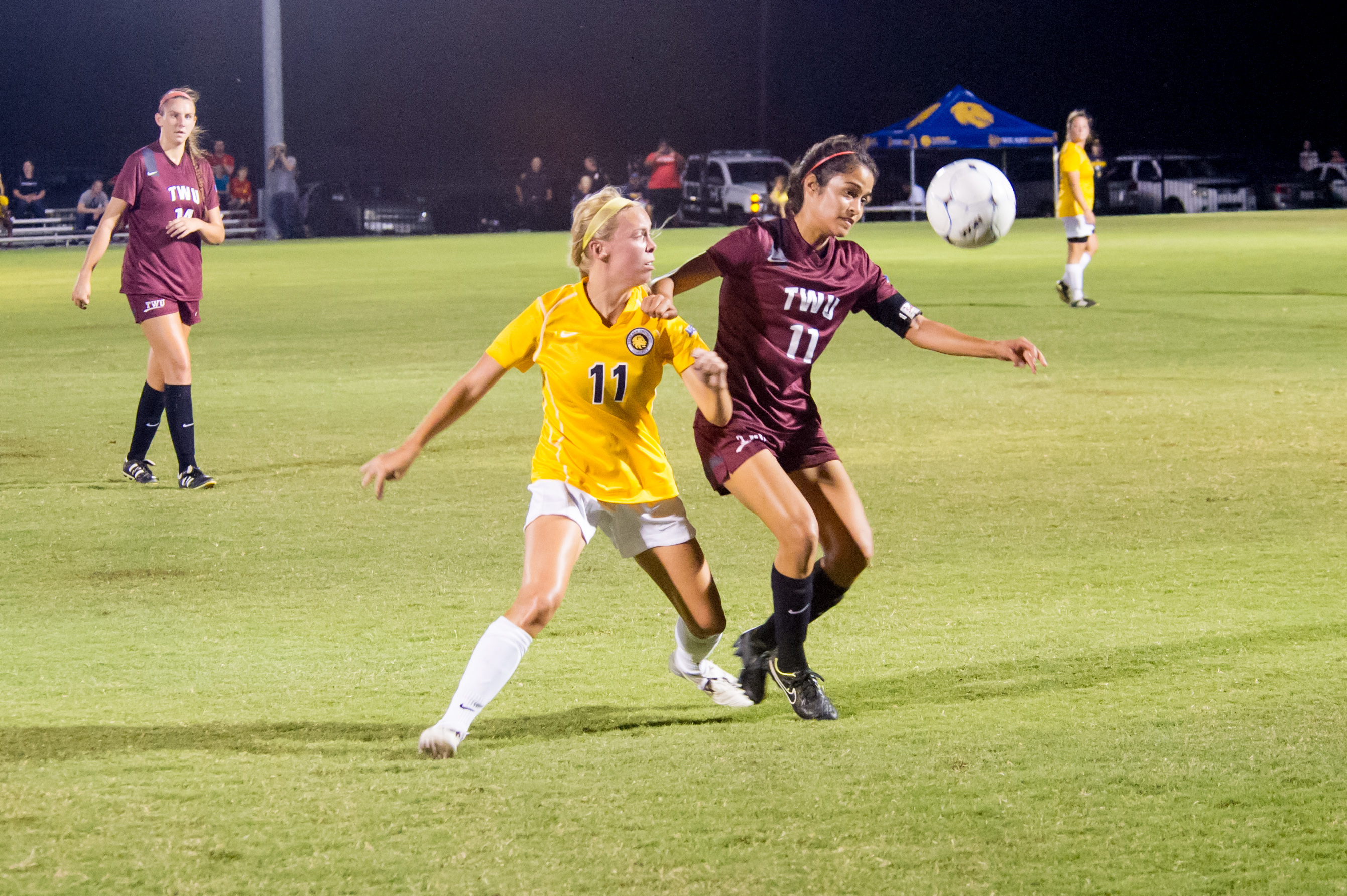
The Lions in action against the Texas Woman's Pioneers

Year	Head coach	Overall	Pct.	Conf.	Pct.	Place	Tourn.	Postseason
1995	Mike Munch	0-2-2	.250	–	–	–	–	–
1996	Mike Munch	9-8-2	.526	2-4-2	.375	T4th	Semifinals	–
1997	Mike Munch	12-8	.600	6-4	.600	T2nd	Semifinals	–
1998	Neil Piper	13-6	.684	5-2	.714	T3rd	Semifinals	–
1999	Neil Piper	16-4-1	.786	7-1-1	.833	1st	Champions	Elite Eight
2000	Neil Piper	9-6-1	.594	3–4	.429	6th	–	–
2001	Neil Piper	9-8-2	.526	5-2	.714	T2nd	Semifinals	–
2002	Neil Piper	14-3-2	.789	4-3-1	.563	5th	–	–
2003	Neil Piper	16-3-3	.795	7-1-1	.833	1st	Runners-Up	First Round
2004	Neil Piper	15-7-1	.674	7-2	.778	2nd	Champions	First Round
2005	Neil Piper	11-5-3	.658	5-2-2	.667	3rd	Quarterfinals	–
2006	Neil Piper	12-8-3	.587	6-2-1	.722	T3rd	Runners-Up	–
2007	Neil Piper	9-10-1	.475	5-4	.556	T3rd	Semifinals	–
2008	Neil Piper	16-4-3	.761	7-1-2	.800	T1st	Runners-Up	Sweet Sixteen
2009	Neil Piper	10-8-1	.553	5-5	.500	6th	Quarterfinals	–
2010	Neil Piper	8-7-3	.528	4-4-3	.500	6th	Quarterfinals	–
2011	Neil Piper	8-9-3	.475	6-6-2	.500	4th	Semifinals	–
2012	Neil Piper	5–12	.294	4–10	.286	T7th	–	–
2013	Neil Piper	11-6-2	.632	5-4-1	.550	3rd	Semifinals	First Round
2014	Neil Piper	16-5-1	.750	7-3	.700	1st	Champions	Sweet Sixteen
2015	Neil Piper	13-6-2	.667	7-1-2	.800	2nd	Champions	First round
2016	Neil Piper	15-6-1	.705	9-3-0	.750	T1st	Runners-Up	Sweet Sixteen
2017	Neil Piper	12-4-3	.711	8-3-1	.708	2nd	Semifinals	–
2018	Neil Piper	9-8	.529	6-6	.500	4th	Quarterfinals	–
2019	Neil Piper	10-8-1	.553	7-6	.538	7th	Quarterfinals	–
2020	Neil Piper	4-3	.571	3-2	.600	4th	Semifinals	–
2021	Neil Piper	10-8-2	.550	7-5-1	.577	7th	Semifinals	–
2022	Ashley Gordon	9-9-2	.500	7-4-1	.625	3rd	Runners-Up	–
2023	Ashley Gordon	9-7-3	.553	7-1-2	.800	2nd	First Round	—
2024	Ashley Gordon	9-10-3	.477	6-3-1	.650	3rd	Runners-Up	—
2025	Ashley Gordon	7-8-4	.474	4-2-4	.600	4th	Quarterfinals	—

Year-by-year results through the end of the 2025 season

== Stadium ==
Lion Soccer Field
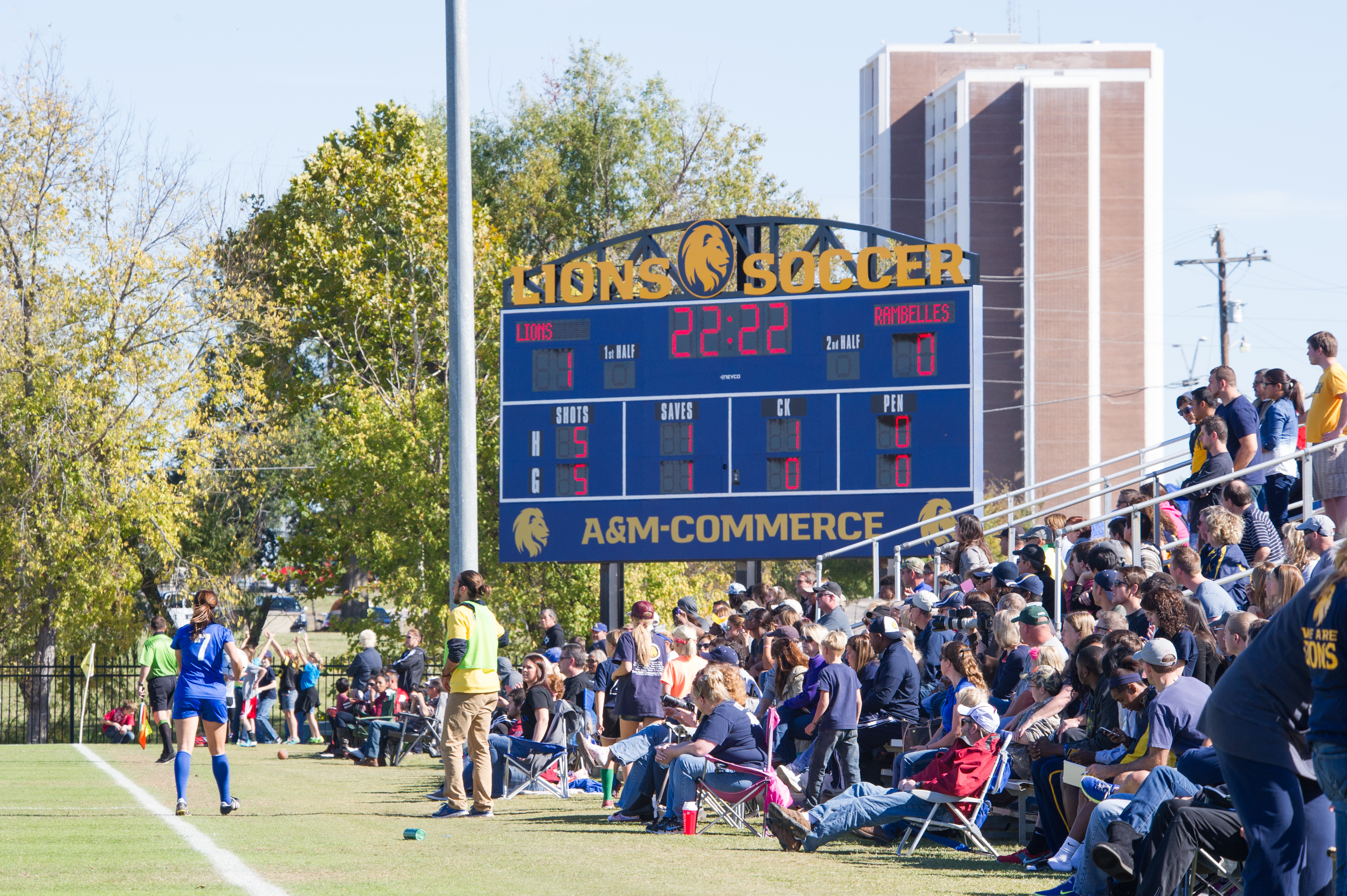
- Lion Soccer Field as it appeared during the 2014 season
- Interactive map of Lion Soccer Field
- Location: On Hubbell Dr and Culver St; Commerce, Texas
- Coordinates: 33°14′17.9″N 95°54′57.8″W
- Owner: East Texas A&M University
- Operator: East Texas A&M University
- Seating type: bleacher bench
- Capacity: 500
- Surface: grass
- Scoreboard: electronic, digital
- Field size: 115 X 72 yards

Construction
- Built: 2009
- Opened: September 24, 1999

Tenants
- East Texas A&M University (NCAA)

Lion Soccer Field has been the home of the East Texas A&M Lions women's soccer team since 1999. The stadium seats 500 spectators with bleacher seating and has a playing surface that measures 115 yards (105 m) by 72 yards (66 m). Prior to its construction, the land on which it was built had been occupied by a botanical nursery and tennis courts.

=== Improvements ===
At the time it hosted its first game, on September 24, 1999, the venue consisted of little more than a Bermuda grass field, a scoreboard donated by a local business, and a chain-link fence around the perimeter. Over the next decade and a half, Lion Soccer Field benefited from numerous upgrades, including the addition of floodlights to enable the playing of night games (2009), a press box (2011), a permanent black metal fence to replace the chain-link fence (2013), and a new scoreboard (2014).

=== Post season play ===
In 2014, the stadium hosted both the Lone Star Conference Tournament as well as two opening-round games in the South Central Region of the NCAA Division II Tournament.

=== High attendance ===
Below is the Lions' yearly high home attendance at the Lion Soccer Field since 2010.

Season	High
Yearly Home Attendance
2022	711
2021	257
2020	217*
2019	412
2018	605
2017	337
2016	630
2015	306
2014	537
2013	431
2012	448
2011	212
2010	221

- Stadium capacity limited due to COVID19 precautions
