= Southeastern Louisiana Lions and Lady Lions =

Intercollegiate sports teams of Southern Louisiana University

- University: Southeastern Louisiana University
- Nickname: Lions and Lady Lions
- NCAA: Division I (FCS)
- Conference: Southland Conference
- Athletic director: Jay Artigues
- Location: Hammond, Louisiana
- Varsity teams: 14
- Football stadium: Strawberry Stadium
- Basketball arena: Pride Roofing University Center
- Baseball stadium: Pat Kenelly Diamond at Alumni Field
- Softball stadium: North Oak Park
- Soccer stadium: Southeastern Soccer Complex
- Other venues: Southeastern Tennis Complex; Southeastern Track Complex
- Colors: Green and gold
- Mascot: Roomie the Lion
- Website: lionsports.net

The Southeastern Louisiana University Lions and Lady Lions are composed of 14 teams representing Southeastern Louisiana University in intercollegiate athletics, competing in the NCAA Division I Football Championship Subdivision (FCS) and are members of the Southland Conference.

== Sports sponsored ==
Men's sports	Women's sports
Baseball	Basketball
Basketball	Beach volleyball
Cross country	Cross country
Football	Soccer
Golf	Softball
Track and field^{†}	Tennis
	Track and field^{†}
	Volleyball
† – Track and field includes both indoor and outdoor

=== Baseball ===
The Southeastern Louisiana University Lion Baseball team represents Southeastern Louisiana University in Hammond, Louisiana. The team is a member of the Southland Conference, which is part of the NCAA Division I. The team plays its home games at Pat Kenelly Diamond at Alumni Field.

=== Men's basketball ===
The Southeastern Louisiana University Lion Basketball team represents Southeastern Louisiana University in Hammond, Louisiana. The school's team currently competes in the Southland Conference, which is part of the NCAA Division I. The team plays its home games at the University Center.

=== Women's basketball ===
The Southeastern Louisiana University Lady Lion basketball team represents Southeastern Louisiana University in Hammond, Louisiana. The school's team currently competes in the Southland Conference, which is part of the NCAA Division I. The team plays its home games at the University Center.

=== Women's beach volleyball ===
The Southeastern Louisiana Lions women's beach volleyball team represents Southeastern Louisiana University in Division I women's beach volleyball in the Southland Conference. The team first played in spring 2020.

=== Football ===
The Southeastern Louisiana University Lions football team represents Southeastern Louisiana University located in Hammond, Louisiana. The team competes in the Southland Conference, which is part of Division I FCS. The team plays its home games at Strawberry Stadium.

=== Softball ===
The Southeastern Louisiana University Lady Lion softball team represents Southeastern Louisiana University located in Hammond, Louisiana. The team competes in the Southland Conference, which is part of the NCAA Division I. The team plays its home games at North Oak Park.

== National championships ==
=== Team ===
Sport	Association	Division	Year	Opponent/Runner-up	Score
Men's outdoor track and field (1)	NAIA	Single	1975	Eastern New Mexico	68–63 (+5)
Cheer (1)	UCA	Open Co-Ed Game Day	2024		97.1667

== Traditions ==
=== "Lion Up!" cheer and gesture ===
In 2014 all Southeastern athletic teams adopted the Texas Tech University hand gesture and modified the related "Guns Up!" cheer to "Lion Up!" The gesture's "L" shape thus stands for "Lion" instead of the pistol it represents at Texas Tech.

== See also ==
- List of NCAA Division I institutions
