= Incarnate Word Cardinals =

Intercollegiate sports teams of University of the Incarnate Word

- University: University of the Incarnate Word
- Nickname: Cardinals
- NCAA: Division I (FCS)
- Conference: Southland (primary); OVC (men's soccer); MPSF (fencing, swimming & diving)
- Athletic director: Vacant
- Location: San Antonio, Texas
- Varsity teams: 25 (11 men's, 14 women's)
- Football stadium: Gayle and Tom Benson Stadium
- Basketball arena: McDermott Center
- Baseball stadium: Sullivan Field
- Softball stadium: H-E-B Field
- Soccer stadium: Gayle and Tom Benson Stadium
- Aquatics center: Ann Barshop Natatorium
- Tennis venue: Mabry Tennis Center
- Colors: Red, white, and black
- Mascot: Red Cardinal
- Website: uiwcardinals.com

The Incarnate Word Cardinals, also known as UIW Cardinals, are composed of 25 teams representing the University of the Incarnate Word in intercollegiate athletics, including men and women's basketball, cross country, golf, soccer, swimming & diving, tennis, and track and field. Men's sports include baseball and football. Women's sports include softball, synchronized swimming, and volleyball. The Cardinals compete in NCAA Division I and are members of the Southland Conference. UIW has sent multiple fencers to compete in multiple NCAA Fencing Championships (2016, 2017, 2024)., On November 12, 2021, Incarnate Word accepted their invitation to join the Western Athletic Conference in 2022. However, on June 24, 2022, just one week before the change of conferences was scheduled to take place, Incarnate Word announced that it would remain in the Southland Conference.

== Sports sponsored ==
Men's sports	Women's sports
Baseball	Softball
Basketball	Basketball
Cross country	Cross country
Fencing	Fencing
Golf	Golf
Soccer	Soccer
Swimming and diving	Swimming and diving
Tennis	Tennis
Track and field^{†}	Track and field^{†}
Football	Cheerleading
	Synchronized swimming
	Volleyball
	Dance
† – Track and field includes both indoor and outdoor

== See also ==
- List of NCAA Division I institutions
