= Northwestern State Demons and Lady Demons =

Intercollegiate sports teams of Northwestern State University

Northwestern State Demons
- University: Northwestern State University
- Nickname: Demons and Lady Demons
- NCAA: Division I (FCS)
- Conference: Southland
- Athletic director: Kevin Bostian
- Location: Natchitoches, Louisiana
- Varsity teams: 12
- Football stadium: Harry Turpin Stadium
- Basketball arena: Prather Coliseum
- Baseball stadium: H. Alvin Brown–C. C. Stroud Field
- Softball stadium: Lady Demon Diamond
- Soccer stadium: Lady Demon Soccer Complex
- Other venues: Jack Fisher Tennis Complex; Walter P. Ledet Track and Field Complex
- Colors: Purple, white, and orange trim
- Mascot: Vic the Demon
- Website: nsudemons.com

The Northwestern State University athletic teams go by the Demons, with women's athletic teams generally called the Lady Demons, and its mascot is Vic the Demon. Once a member of the SIAA conference, the school now competes in the Southland Conference.

== Sports sponsored ==
Men's sports	Women's sports
Baseball	Basketball
Basketball	Cross country
Cross country	Soccer
Football	Softball
Track and field^{1}	Tennis
	Track and field^{1}
	Volleyball
^{1} – Track and field includes both indoor and outdoor.

=== Baseball ===
The baseball team represents Northwestern State University in Natchitoches, Louisiana. The team is a member of the Southland Conference, which is part of the NCAA Division I. The team plays its home games at H. Alvin Brown–C. C. Stroud Field.

=== Men's basketball ===
The men's basketball team represents Northwestern State University in Natchitoches, Louisiana. The school's team currently competes in the Southland Conference, which is part of the NCAA Division I. The team plays its home games at Prather Coliseum.

On March 17, 2006, NSU's 14th-seeded basketball team shocked the college basketball world by defeating 3rd-seeded, 11th-ranked, Big Ten Conference tournament champion Iowa in the first round of the 2006 NCAA men's basketball tournament on a late three-pointer by Jermaine Wallace. NSU was the lowest-seeded team to advance to the second round in 2006. NSU's men's basketball team also won the inaugural play-in game, beating the Winthrop University Eagles 71–67 in 2001 NCAA men's basketball tournament. Both teams were considered #16 seeds competing to advance to the opening round. In winning, the Demons, therefore, became the first #16 seed to earn a victory in the NCAA Tournament.

=== Women's basketball ===
The women's basketball team represents Northwestern State University in Natchitoches, Louisiana. The school's team currently competes in the Southland Conference, which is part of the NCAA Division I. The team plays its home games at Prather Coliseum.

=== Football ===
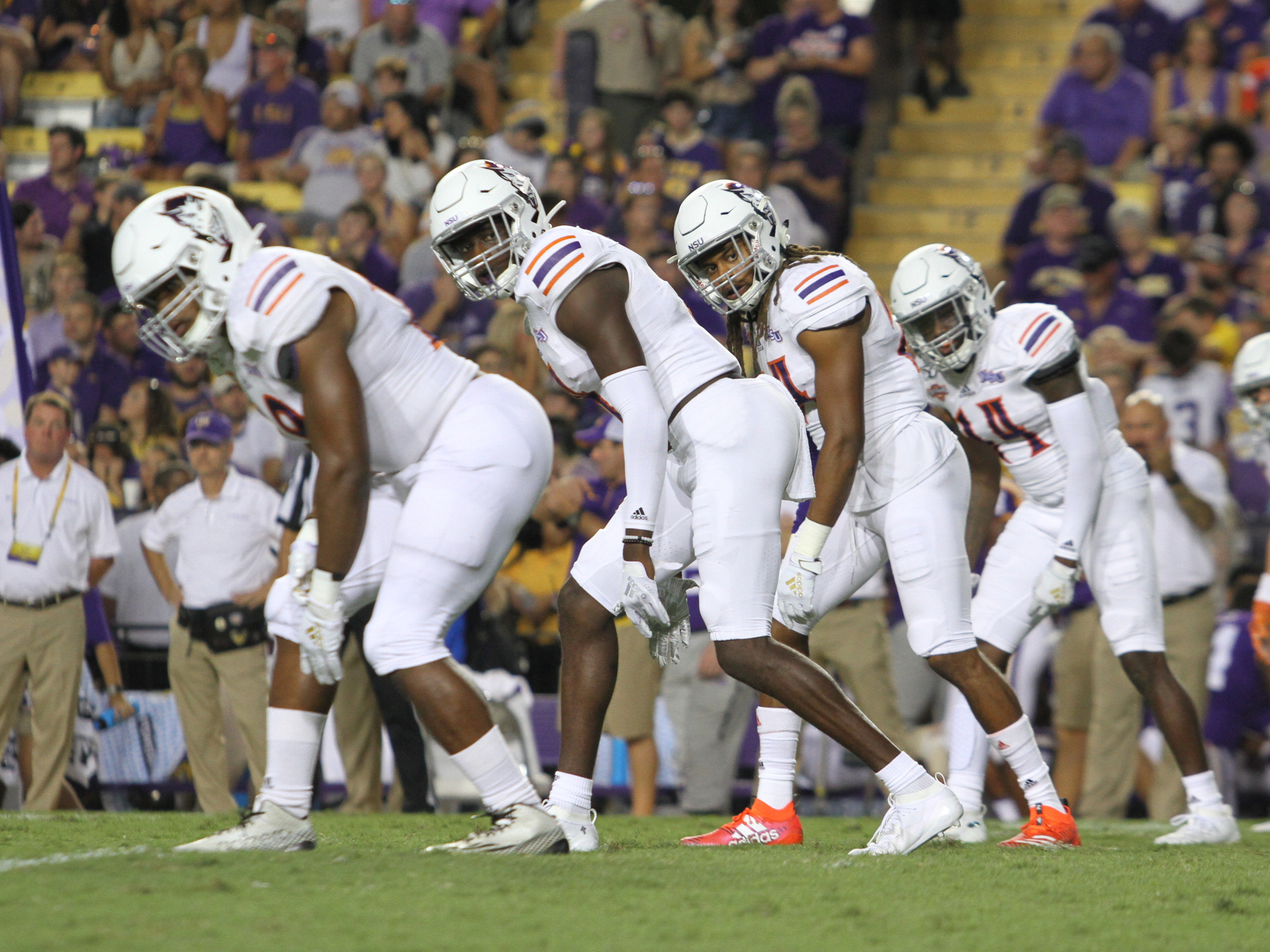
Northwestern State football players line up during a 2019 game at Tiger Stadium

The football team represents Northwestern State University located in Natchitoches, Louisiana. The team competes in the Southland Conference, which is part of Division I FCS. The team plays its home games at Harry Turpin Stadium.

=== Softball ===
The softball team represents Northwestern State University located in Natchitoches, Louisiana. The team competes in the Southland Conference, which is part of the NCAA Division I. The team plays its home games at Lady Demon Diamond.

== Traditions ==
=== Fork 'em ===
"Fork 'em" is a hand gesture and slogan used by students at Northwestern State University in their celebration of sports teams. The gesture is performed by curling the ring and middle fingers under the thumb against the palm, and extending the pinky and index fingers – similar to the University of Texas "Hook 'em Horns" gesture except the index finger and pinky are held straight up and down, not out to the sides.

== Notable players and coaches ==
- Kenta Bell, U.S. Olympian
- LaMark Carter, U.S. Olympian
- Joe Delaney, former Kansas City Chiefs running back
- George Doherty, former head football coach of the Demons. NSU athletic offices are housed in the George Doherty Wing.
- Mark Duper, Miami Dolphins wide receiver
- D'or Fischer (born 1981), American-Israeli basketball player
- Bobby Hebert, former New Orleans Saints quarterback
- Charlie Hennigan, former Houston Oilers wide receiver
- Jeremy Lane, former Seattle Seahawks cornerback
- Brian Lawrence, MLB pitcher
- Terrence McGee, former Buffalo Bills cornerback and Pro Bowl kickoff returner
- Ed Orgeron, LSU Tigers head football coach
- Don Shows, Demons offensive line coach in 1988 season, won conference championship; later at West Monroe High School from 1989 to 2012, fourth winningest coach in Louisiana state high school football history
- Jackie Smith, St. Louis Cardinals and Dallas Cowboys tight end
- Lee Smith, former Major League relief pitcher
- John Stephens, New England Patriots running back
- Robert Quin Sirmon, benchwarmer, quidditch

== See also ==
- List of NCAA Division I institutions
