= Texas A&M–Corpus Christi Islanders =

Intercollegiate sports teams of Texas A&M University–Corpus Christi

- University: Texas A&M University–Corpus Christi
- NCAA: Division I
- Conference: Southland Conference
- Athletic director: Adrian Rodriguez
- Location: Corpus Christi, Texas
- Varsity teams: 16
- Basketball arena: American Bank Center; Dugan Wellness Center
- Baseball stadium: Chapman Field; Whataburger Field
- Softball stadium: Chapman Field (softball)
- Soccer stadium: Dr. Jack Dugan Family Soccer & Track Stadium
- Nickname: Islanders
- Colors: Royal blue, white, and green
- Mascot: Izzy the Islander
- Website: goislanders.com
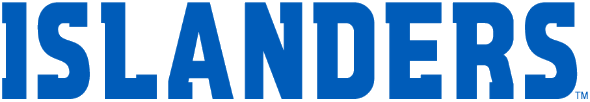

The Texas A&M–Corpus Christi Islanders are the athletic teams that represent Texas A&M University–Corpus Christi, located in Corpus Christi, Texas, in intercollegiate athletics as a member of the Division I level of the National Collegiate Athletic Association (NCAA), primarily competing in the Southland Conference since the 2006–07 academic year. Prior to that, the Islanders had competed as an NCAA Division III Independent from 1999–2000 to 2001–02; as well as an NCAA D-I Independent from 2002–03 to 2005–06.

== Nickname/mascot ==
TAMUCC's team nickname, the Islanders, was taken from the institution being located on an island. Their mascot is "Izzy the Islander", a blue costumed man that shows resemblances of a wave. The former “Izzy” mascot was a costumed man with a tiki mask headdress, grass skirt, and spear but has since been retired. Prior to that, the official mascot was "Tarpie" the Tarpon.

== Varsity teams ==
TAMUCC competes in 16 intercollegiate varsity sports: Men's sports include baseball, basketball, cross country, tennis and track & field (indoor and outdoor); women's sports include basketball, beach volleyball, cross country, golf, soccer, softball, tennis, track and field (indoor and outdoor) and volleyball.

Men's sports	Women's sports
Baseball	Basketball
Basketball	Beach volleyball
Cross country	Cross country
Tennis	Golf
Track and field^{†}	Soccer
	Softball
	Tennis
	Track and field^{†}
	Volleyball
† – Track and field includes both indoor and outdoor

== See also ==
- List of NCAA Division I institutions
