= Southland Conference women's soccer tournament =

- Conference soccer championship
- Southland Conference logo
- Sport: Soccer
- Conference: Southland Conference
- Number of teams: 7
- Format: Single elimination
- Current stadium: LU Soccer Complex
- Current location: Corpus Christi, Texas
- Played: 1997–present
- Last contest: 2026
- Current champion: Lamar (5th title)
- Most championships: Lamar; Northwestern State; Southeastern Louisiana; Texas State; (5 titles eacg)
- TV partner: ESPN+
- Official website: southland.org/wsoc

Sponsors
- Jersey Mike's Subs

The Southland Conference women's soccer tournament is the conference championship tournament in women's soccer for the Southland Conference. The winner of the tournament receives the conference's automatic bid to the NCAA Division I women's soccer tournament.

Four teams, Lamar, Northwestern State, Southeastern Louisiana, and Texas State are the most winning teams with five titles each.

== Champions ==
=== Key ===
Key

- (1) — Title number
- a.e.t. — Match went to extra time
- p – Match decided by a penalty shootout after extra time
- – Winning team also won regular season

=== By year ===
Ed.	Year	Champion	Score	Runner-up	Venue / city	MVP	Ref.
1	1997	Northwestern State (1)	2–0	Southeastern	Nacogdoches, TX	Wendy Woodham, Northwestern State	
2	1988	Southeastern (1)	1–0	Stephen F. Austin	Nacogdoches, TX	Kim Kwolek, Southeastern	
3	1999	Southwest Texas State (Note: Now branded athletically as "Texas State".) (1)	0–0 (7–6 p)	Southeastern	Nacogdoches, TX	Mandy Brandon, Texas State	
4	2000	Northwestern State (2)	1–0	Southeastern	Lady Demon Complex • Natchitoches, LA	Reta Derouin, Texas State	
5	2001	Southwest Texas State (2)	3–2	Southeastern	Bobcat Soccer Complex • San Marcos, TX	Britiany Cargill, Northwestern State	
6	2002	Northwestern State (3)	2–1	Southeastern	Strawberry Stadium • Hammond, LA	Nellie Latiolais, Northwestern State	
7	2003	Stephen F. Austin (1)	2–0	Southeastern	Lady Demon Complex • Natchitoches, LA	Natascia Michalezki, Stephen F. Austin	
8	2004	Southwest Texas State (3)	1–0	Northeast Louisiana (Note: Now branded athletically as "Louisiana–Monroe".)	Strawberry Stadium • Hammond, LA	Janee Sherman, Texas State	
9	2005	Northwestern State (4)	1–0 (a.e.t.)	Sam Houston State (Note: Now branded athletically as "Sam Houston", without the "State".)	Lady Demon Complex • Natchitoches, LA	Raquel Bueno, Sam Houston State	
10	2006	McNeese State (Note: Now branded athletically as McNeese, without "State".) (1)	1–0	Southwest Texas State	Bobcat Soccer Complex • San Marcos, TX	Kamryn Koch, McNeese State	
11	2007	Stephen F. Austin (2)	3–0	McNeese State	Lady Demon Complex • Natchitoches, LA	Erika Palmacci, Stephen F. Austin	
12	2008	Southwest Texas State (4)	2–1	McNeese State	Cowgirl Field • Lake Charles, LA	Lauren Lewis, Southwest Texas State	
13	2009	Southeastern (2)	2–0	Southwest Texas State	Lady Demon Complex • Natchitoches, LA	Lacey Bockhaus, Southeastern	
14	2010	Texas–San Antonio (Note: Now branded athletically as "UTSA".) (1)	1–0 (a.e.t.)	Southeastern	Bobcat Soccer Complex • San Marcos, TX	Dacia Webb, Texas–San Antonio	
15	2011	Southwest Texas State (5)	1–0	Stephen F. Austin	Lady Demon Complex • Natchitoches, LA	Lauren Frazier, Southwest Texas State	
16	2012	Stephen F. Austin (3)	2–1	Lamar	Cowgirl Field • Lake Charles, LA	Zuri Prince, Stephen F. Austin	
17	2013	Southeastern (3)	0–0 (3–1 p)	Stephen F. Austin	Cowgirl Field • Lake Charles, LA	Hope Sabadash, Southeastern	
18	2014	Houston Baptist (Note: Now branded athletically as Houston Christian.) (1)	2–0	Nicholls	LU Soccer Complex • Beaumont, TX	Patty Walrath, Houston Baptist	
19	2015	Southeastern (4)	0–0 (3–1 p)	Sam Houston State	Bill Stephens Soccer Center • Conway, AR	Hope Sabadash, Southeastern	
20	2016	Houston Baptist (2)	1–0	Stephen F. Austin	Dr. Jack Dugan Soccer & Track Stadium • Corpus Christi, TX	Allison Abendschein, Houston Baptist	
21	2017	Lamar (1)	2–0	Stephen F. Austin	Dr. Jack Dugan Soccer & Track Stadium • Corpus Christi, TX	Madison Ledet, Lamar	
22	2018	Abilene Christian (1)	3–1	Stephen F. Austin	LU Soccer Complex • Beaumont, TX	Shay Johnson, Abilene Christian	
23	2019	Lamar (2)	2–1	Northwestern State	Bill Stephens Soccer Center • Conway, AR	Esther Okoronkwo, Lamar	
24	2020	Southeastern (4)	3–0	Sam Houston	LU Soccer Complex • Beaumont, TX	Nadine Maher, Southeastern	
25	2021	Northwestern State (5)	1–0	Incarnate Word	Dr. Jack Dugan Soccer & Track Stadium • Corpus Christi, TX	Acelya Aydogmus, Northwestern State	
26	2022	Lamar (3)	4–1	Texas A&M–Commerce	Lady Demon Soccer Complex • Natchitoches, LA	Christine Kitaru, Lamar	
27	2023	Lamar (4)	3–1	McNeese	Dr. Jack Dugan Soccer & Track Stadium • Corpus Christi, TX	Arely Alaniz, Lamar	
28	2024	Stephen F. Austin (4)	2–0	East Texas A&M	Dr. Jack Dugan Soccer & Track Stadium • Corpus Christi, TX	Jayme Bailey, Stephen F. Austin	
29	2025	Houston Christian (3)	1–0 (a.e.t.)	Stephen F. Austin	LU Soccer Complex • Beaumont, TX	Olivia Rossman, HCU	
30	2026	Lamar (5)	4–0	Northwestern State	Lion Soccer Field • Commerce, TX	Kamryn Harvey, Lamar	

=== By school ===
As of 2026 Tournament

School	Apps.	W	L	T	Pct.	Finals	Titles	Winning years
Abilene Christian	4	4	2	2	.625	1	1	2018
Central Arkansas	5	2	4	1	.357	0	0	—
East Texas A&M (Texas A&M–Commerce)	5	3	4	1	.438	2	0	—
Houston Christian (Houston Baptist)	10	10	7	2	.579	3	3	2014, 2016, 2025
Incarnate Word	4	3	4	1	.438	1	0	—
Lamar	11	14	7	1	.659	6	6	2017, 2019, 2022, 2023, 2026
Louisiana–Monroe	5	3	5	0	.375	1	0	—
McNeese (McNeese State)	22	10	19	2	.355	4	1	2006
Nicholls	6	1	6	0	.143	1	0	—
Northwestern State	19	17	12	5	.574	7	5	1997, 2000, 2002, 2005, 2021
Oral Roberts	2	1	1	1	.500	0	0	—
Sam Houston (Sam Houston State)	12	9	8	4	.524	2	0	—
Stephen F. Austin	24	18	16	8	.524	12	4	2003, 2007, 2012, 2024
Southeastern	25	17	19	9	.478	12	5	1998, 2009, 2013, 2015, 2020
Texas A&M–Corpus Christi	9	1	6	4	.273	0	0	—
Texas State (Southwest Texas State)	12	14	7	2	.652	7	5	1999, 2001, 2004, 2008, 2011
UT Rio Grande Valley	1	0	1	0	.000	0	0	—
UTSA (Texas–San Antonio)	6	5	5	1	.500	1	1	2010

Teams in Italics no longer sponsor women's soccer in the Southland Conference
