= 2015 Southland Conference women's soccer tournament =

- Classification: Division I
- Teams: 6
- Matches: 5
- Attendance: 1,438
- Site: Bill Stephens Track/Soccer Complex; Conway, Arkansas
- Champions: Southeastern (4th title)
- Winning coach: Blake Hornbuckle (4th title)
- MVP: Hope Sabadash (Southeastern)
- Broadcast: Southland Digital Network; ESPN3 (Final)

2015 Southland Conference women's soccer standings
	Conf.						Overall
Team	W		L		T	PCT	W		L		T	PCT
Stephen F. Austin ‍†‍‍	8	–	1	–	2	.818	9	–	8	–	2	.526
Houston Baptist ‍‍‍	8	–	3	–	0	.727	10	–	6	–	1	.618
Abilene Christian* ‍‍‍	7	–	2	–	2	.727	8	–	8	–	3	.500
Southeastern Louisiana ‍‍‡‍^{y}	6	–	3	–	2	.636	13	–	5	–	4	.682
Sam Houston State ‍‍‍	6	–	3	–	2	.636	10	–	6	–	5	.595
Texas A&M–Corpus Christi ‍‍‍	5	–	5	–	1	.500	5	–	11	–	2	.333
Central Arkansas ‍‍‍	4	–	6	–	1	.409	7	–	11	–	2	.400
Lamar ‍‍‍	4	–	6	–	1	.409	7	–	11	–	1	.395
Nicholls State ‍‍‍	4	–	7	–	0	.364	6	–	10	–	1	.382
Northwestern State ‍‍‍	2	–	6	–	3	.318	5	–	9	–	4	.389
McNeese State ‍‍‍	3	–	8	–	0	.273	6	–	11	–	0	.353
Incarnate Word* ‍‍‍	1	–	8	–	2	.182	3	–	14	–	2	.211
† – Conference champion ‡ – 2015 Southland Tournament champion y – Invited to the NCAA Tournament * – Abilene Christian and Incarnate Word ineligible for postseason (D2 to D1 regulations); As of November 8, 2015; Rankings from NSCAA

The 2015 Southland Conference women's soccer tournament was the postseason women's soccer tournament for the Southland Conference held from November 5 to 8, 2015. The five match tournament was at Bill Stephens Track/Soccer Stadium in Conway, Arkansas. The six team single-elimination tournament consisted of three rounds based on seeding from regular season conference play. The Houston Baptist Huskies were the defending tournament champions after defeating the Stephen F. Austin Ladyjacks 2-0 in the championship match.

== Bracket ==
First round Wednesday, Nov. 5
4	Southeastern Louisiana	3
5	Texas A&M-Corpus Christi	1
3	Sam Houston State	0 (Note: SHSU won on PK 4-3)
6	Central Arkansas	0

Semifinals; Friday, Nov. 6
1	Stephen F. Austin	0
4	Southeastern Louisiana	1
2	Houston Baptist	0
3	Sam Houston State	2

Final; Sunday, Nov. 8
4	Southeastern Louisiana	0 (Note: SLU won on PK 3-1)
3	Sam Houston State	0

== All-Tournament team ==
Player	Team
**Hope Sabadash**	Southeastern
Maggie Ramsey	Southeastern
Gisenia Uteras	Southeastern
Maddie Allen	Southeastern
Kylie Hamberton	Sam Houston
Allie Johnson	Sam Houston
Mariah Titus	Sam Houston
Lauren Mecuri	Central Arkansas
Hailey Sutton	Texas A&M-Corpus Christi
Brooke Dunnigan	Stephen F. Austin

MVP in bold
