= 2017 Southland Conference women's soccer tournament =

- Classification: Division I
- Teams: 6
- Matches: 5
- Attendance: 906
- Site: Dugan Stadium; Corpus Christi, Texas
- Champions: Lamar (1st title)
- Winning coach: Steve Holeman (1st title)
- MVP: Madison Ledet (Lamar)
- Broadcast: Southland Digital Network; ESPN3 (Final)

2017 Southland Conference women's soccer standings
	Conf.						Overall
Team	W		L		T	PCT	W		L		T	PCT
Lamar ‍†‍‡‍^{y}	10	–	1	–	0	.909	18	–	4	–	1	.804
Stephen F. Austin ‍‍‍	8	–	3	–	0	.727	12	–	8	–	1	.595
McNeese State ‍‍‍	8	–	3	–	0	.727	12	–	5	–	2	.684
Central Arkansas ‍‍‍	7	–	4	–	0	.636	11	–	10	–	0	.524
Houston Baptist ‍‍‍	6	–	3	–	2	.636	7	–	7	–	3	.500
Abilene Christian ‍‍‍	6	–	5	–	0	.545	8	–	10	–	2	.450
Sam Houston State ‍‍‍	4	–	5	–	2	.455	7	–	9	–	2	.444
Texas A&M–Corpus Christi ‍‍‍	3	–	6	–	2	.364	6	–	9	–	3	.417
Southeastern Louisiana ‍‍‍	3	–	6	–	2	.364	5	–	10	–	3	.361
Nicholls State ‍‍‍	3	–	7	–	1	.318	6	–	11	–	1	.361
Northwestern State ‍‍‍	2	–	9	–	0	.182	6	–	12	–	0	.333
Incarnate Word ‍‍‍	1	–	9	–	1	.136	2	–	13	–	1	.156
† – Conference champion ‡ – 2017 Southland Tournament champion y – Invited to the NCAA tournament As of November 10, 2017; Rankings from United Soccer Coaches Poll; Source:Southland Conference

The 2017 Southland Conference women's soccer tournament was the postseason women's soccer tournament for the Southland Conference held from November 1–5, 2017. The seven-match tournament took place at Jack Dugan Stadium in Corpus Christi, Texas. The eight-team single-elimination tournament consisted of three rounds based on seeding from regular season conference play. The Houston Baptist Huskies were the defending champions, but they were eliminated from the 2017 tournament with a 1–0 quarterfinal loss to the Central Arkansas Sugar Bears. The Lamar Lady Cardinals won the tournament with a 2–0 win over the Stephen F. Austin Ladyjacks in the final. This was the first Southland Conference tournament title for the Lamar women's soccer program and for head coach Steve Holeman.

== Bracket ==
Quarterfinals; Wednesday, Nov. 1
1	Lamar	1
8	Texas A&M–Corpus Christi	0
4	Central Arkansas	1
5	Houston Baptist	0
2	Stephen F. Austin	4
7	Sam Houston State	1
3	McNeese State	0 (3)
6	Abilene Christian	0 (5)

Semifinals; Friday, Nov. 3
1	Lamar	2
4	Central Arkansas	1
2	Stephen F. Austin	0 (4)
6	Abilene Christian	0 (2)

Final; Sunday, Nov. 5
1	Lamar	2
2	Stephen F. Austin	0

== Schedule ==
=== Quarterfinals ===
November 1, 2017	#2 Stephen F. Austin	4–1	#7 Sam Houston State	Corpus Christi, Texas
11:00 a.m. CDT	Breanna Moore 20'; Hanna Barker 49'; Mari Gillespie 52' (pen.); Carli Arthurs 69'	Report	67' Carly English	Stadium: Dugan Stadium

November 1, 2017	#3 McNeese State	0–0 (a.e.t.) (3–5 p)	#6 Abilene Christian	Corpus Christi, Texas
2:00 p.m. CDT		Report		Stadium: Dugan Stadium; Referee: Tom Harlett; Assistant referees: Joaquin Garza; Julio Villarruel; Fourth official: Travis Haight
	Penalties
	Dayna Garcia (penalty scored); Rachel Palet (penalty scored); Gabi D'Alesandro (penalty scored); Morgan Middleton (penalty missed)		(penalty scored) Megan Baer; (penalty scored) Michelle Mulrooney; (penalty scored) Christina Arteaga; (penalty scored) Chloe Fifer; (penalty scored) Caity Acosta

November 1, 2017	#4 Central Arkansas	1–0	#5 Houston Baptist	Corpus Christi, Texas
5:00 p.m. CDT	Maci Schoonover 74'	Report		Stadium: Dugan Stadium

November 1, 2017	#1 Lamar	1–0	#8 Texas A&M–Corpus Christi	Corpus Christi, Texas
8:00 p.m. CDT	Madison Ledet 21'	Report		Stadium: Dugan Stadium; Attendance: 526; Referee: Fernando Galvan; Assistant referees: Joaquin Garza; Amanda DiBiasio; Fourth official: Ethan Frie

=== Semifinals ===
November 3, 2017	#2 Stephen F. Austin	0–0 (a.e.t.) (4–2 p)	#6 Abilene Christian	Corpus Christi, Texas
4:00 p.m. CDT		Report		Stadium: Dugan Stadium; Referee: Mark Herrington; Assistant referees: Joaquin Garza; Amanda DiBiasio; Fourth official: Gregorio Garza
	Penalties
	Lauren Hall (penalty scored); Carli Arthurs (penalty scored); Katelyn Termini (penalty scored); Hanna Barker (penalty scored)		(penalty scored) Michelle Mulrooney; (penalty missed) Megan Baer; (penalty scored) Christina Arteaga; (penalty missed) Chloe Fifer

November 3, 2017	#1 Lamar	2–1	#4 Central Arkansas	Corpus Christi, Texas
7:00 p.m. CDT	M.J. Eckart 37'; Madison Ledet 47'	Report	60' Camille Bassett	Stadium: Dugan Stadium; Attendance: 277; Referee: Elton Garcia; Assistant referees: Chris Gordon; Julio Villarruel; Fourth official: Fernando Galvan

=== Final ===
November 5, 2017	#1 Lamar	2–0	#2 Stephen F. Austin	Corpus Christi, Texas
1:05 p.m. CST	Juliana Ocampo 24'; Juli Rocha 40'	Report		Stadium: Dugan Stadium; Attendance: 103; Referee: Rosendo Mendoza; Assistant referees: Chris Gordon; Gregorio Garza; Fourth official: Mark Herrington

== Statistics ==
=== Goalscorers ===
2 Goals

- Madison Ledet - Lamar

1 Goal

- Carli Arthurs - Stephen F. Austin
- Hanna Barker - Stephen F. Austin
- Camille Bassett - Central Arkansas
- M.J. Eckart - Lamar
- Carly English - Sam Houston State
- Mari Gillespie - Stephen F. Austin
- Breanna Moore - Stephen F. Austin
- Juliana Ocampo - Lamar
- Juli Rocha - Lamar
- Maci Schoonover - Central Arkansas

== All-Tournament team ==
Player	Team
**Madison Ledet**	Lamar
M. J. Eckart	Lamar
Kelso Peskin	Lamar
Juliana Ocampo	Lamar
Lauren Lovejoy	Lamar
Juli Rocha	Lamar
Hanna Barker	Stephen F. Austin
Carli Arthurs	Stephen F. Austin
Breanna Moore	Stephen F. Austin
Kennedy Rose	Stephen F. Austin
Erin Smith	Abilene Christian

MVP in bold
