= 2025 Southland Conference women's soccer tournament =

- Classification: Division I
- Teams: 8
- Matches: 7
- Attendance: 3,365
- Site: Lamar Soccer Complex; Beaumont, Texas
- Champions: Houston Christian (3rd title)
- Winning coach: Nick Whiting (1st title)
- MVP: Olivia Rossman (Houston Christian)
- Broadcast: ESPN+

2025 Southland Conference women's soccer standings
	Conf.						Overall
Team	W		L		T	PCT	W		L		T	PCT
Northwestern St ‍†‍‍	7	–	2	–	1	.750	13	–	5	–	3	.690
Stephen F. Austin ‍‍‍	5	–	1	–	4	.700	8	–	4	–	10	.591
SE Louisiana ‍‍‍	5	–	3	–	2	.600	6	–	8	–	4	.444
East Texas A&M ‍‍‍	4	–	2	–	4	.600	7	–	8	–	4	.474
Houston Christian ‍‍‡‍^{y}	4	–	4	–	2	.500	12	–	9	–	2	.565
Lamar ‍‍‍	3	–	3	–	4	.500	7	–	8	–	5	.475
Texas A&M-CC ‍‍‍	3	–	4	–	3	.450	5	–	8	–	6	.421
McNeese ‍‍‍	3	–	5	–	2	.400	4	–	12	–	4	.300
UT Rio Grande Valley ‍‍‍	3	–	6	–	1	.350	6	–	10	–	2	.389
Incarnate Word ‍‍‍	2	–	5	–	3	.350	4	–	8	–	4	.375
Nicholls ‍‍‍	1	–	5	–	4	.300	4	–	9	–	5	.361
† – Conference champion ‡ – 2025 Southland Tournament champion y – Invited to the NCAA Tournament; As of December 9, 2025; Rankings from United Soccer Coaches Poll; Source:Southland Conference

The 2025 Southland Conference women's soccer tournament was the postseason women's soccer tournament for the Southland Conference held from November 4 to November 9, 2025. The seven-match tournament took place at Lamar Soccer Complex in Beaumont, Texas on the campus of Lamar University. The eight-team single-elimination tournament consisted of three rounds based on seeding from regular season conference play. The defending champions, the Stephen F. Austin, were unable to defend their title as they lost in the Final. The tournament champions were the Houston Christian Huskies who won the Final in overtime, 1–0. The conference championship was Houston Christian's third title, and first since 2016. It the first title for second-year head coach Nick Whiting. As tournament champions, Houston Christian earned the Southland's automatic berth into the 2025 NCAA Division I women's soccer tournament.

== Seeding ==
The top eight Southland teams from the regular season earned berths in the tournament. Teams were seeded by conference record. No tiebreakers were required as each team finished with a unique conference record, and on a unique number of conference points.

Seed	School	Conference Record	Points
1	Northwestern State	7–2–1	22
2	Stephen F. Austin	5–1–4	19
3	Southeastern Louisiana	5–3–2	17
4	East Texas A&M	4–2–4	16
5	Houston Christian	4–4–2	14
6	Lamar	3–3–4	13
7	Texas A&M-Corpus Christi	3–4–3	12
8	McNeese	3–5–2	11

== Bracket ==
Quarterfinals; November 4
2	Stephen F. Austin (pen.)	1 (4)
7	Texas A&M-Corpus Christi	1 (2)
3	Southeastern Louisiana	1
6	Lamar	2
1	Northwestern State (a.e.t.)	1
8	McNeese	0
4	East Texas A&M	0
5	Houston Christian	4

Semifinals; November 6
2	Stephen F. Austin	2
6	Lamar	0
1	Northwestern State	1
5	Houston Christian	2

Championship; November 9
2	Stephen F. Austin	0
5	Houston Christian (a.e.t.)	1

== Schedule ==
=== First Round ===
November 4	(4) East Texas A&M	0–4	(5) Houston Christian	Beaumont, TX
10:00 a.m. CST		Report	28', 58' Paisley Barela; 59' Isabella Dillow; 71' East Texas A&M Own Goal	Stadium: Lamar Soccer Complex; Attendance: 302; Referee: Tyler Mitcham; Assistant referees: Santiago Roa; Estefania Estrada Sanabria; Fourth official: Timothy Chiasson

November 4	(1) Northwestern State	1–0 (a.e.t.)	(8) McNeese	Beaumont, TX
1:00 p.m. CST	Marissa Henderson (yellow card) 78'; Kendall Hemperly 100'	Report	(yellow card) 90' Alexandra Arvanitis	Stadium: Lamar Soccer Complex; Attendance: 298; Referee: Sean Caouette; Assistant referees: Dylan Butler; Ava Flores; Fourth official: Wes Caouette

November 4	(2) Stephen F. Austin	1–1 (a.e.t.) (4–2 p)	(7) Texas A&M-Corpus Christi	Beaumont, TX
4:00 p.m. CST	Taylor Dodson 3'; Alexis Miller (yellow card) 84'	Report	(yellow card) 69' Ashley Wilson; 90' (pen.) Mai-Lisa Atis	Stadium: Lamar Soccer Complex; Attendance: 213; Referee: Frank Huber; Assistant referees: William Bolsen; Maria Banguera; Fourth official: Santiago Roa
	Penalties
	Alex Bayouth (penalty scored); Lucie Platt (penalty scored); Brielle Buchanan (penalty scored); Alexis Miller (penalty missed); Logan Heausler (penalty scored)		(penalty missed) Ashley Wilson; (penalty missed) Vanessa Wimbish; (penalty scored) Mai-Lisa Atis; (penalty scored) Madison Page

November 4	(3) Southeastern Louisiana	1–2	(6) Lamar	Beaumont, TX
7:00 p.m. CST	Charlotte Lewis (yellow card) 27'; Team (yellow card) 80'; Lainey Connell 83'	Report	31' Kamryn Harvey; 69' Kaitlyn Niemeyer; (yellow card) 89' Olivia Manibo	Stadium: Lamar Soccer Complex; Attendance: 611; Referee: Wes Caouette; Assistant referees: Alexander DeRostaing; Ava Flores; Fourth official: Sean Caouette

=== Semifinals ===
November 6	(1) Northwestern State	1–2	(5) Houston Christian	Beaumont, TX
4:00 p.m. CST	Madison Murphy (yellow card) 19'; Team (yellow card) 57'; Kendall Hemperly 61'	Report	49' (pen.) Alexia Murillo; 83' Paisley Barela	Stadium: Lamar Soccer Complex; Attendance: 417; Referee: Daniel Benson; Assistant referees: William Bolsen; Estefania Estrada Sanabria; Fourth official: Deny Kulasinac

November 6	(2) Stephen F. Austin	2–0	(6) Lamar	Beaumont, TX
7:00 p.m. CST	Logan Heausler (yellow card) 57'; Taylor Dodson (yellow card) 61'; Alex Bayouth 65'; Rachel Robinson (yellow card) 77'; Alexis Miller (yellow card) 85'; Kamrynn Davis 90'	Report	(yellow card) 67' Katherine Williams; (yellow card) 76' Team; (yellow card) 88' Team	Stadium: Lamar Soccer Complex; Attendance: 674; Referee: Deny Kulasinac; Assistant referees: Alexander DeRostaing; William Molina; Fourth official: Daniel Benson

=== Final ===
November 9	(2) Stephen F. Austin	0–1 (a.e.t.)	(5) Houston Christian	Beaumont, TX
1:00 p.m. CST		Report	99' Olivia Rossman	Stadium: Lamar Soccer Complex; Attendance: 850; Referee: Amin Hadzic; Assistant referees: Christopher Little; Frank Huber; Fourth official: Estefania Estrada Sanabria

== Statistics ==
=== Goalscorers ===
There were 16 goals scored in 7 matches, for an average of 2.29 goals per match (as of November 9, 2025).

3 goals

- Paisley Barela – Houston Christian

2 goals

- Kendall Hemperly – Northwestern State

1 goal

- Isabella Dillow – Houston Christian
- Alexia Murillo – Houston Christian
- Olivia Rossman – Houston Christian
- Kamryn Harvey – Lamar
- Kaitlyn Niemeyer – Lamar
- Lainey Connell – Southeastern Louisiana
- Alex Bayouth – Stephen F. Austin
- Kamrynn Davis – Stephen F. Austin
- Taylor Dodson – Stephen F. Austin
- Mai-Lisa Atis – Texas A&M-Corpus Christi

1 own goal

- East Texas A&M (vs Houston Christian)

== All-Tournament team ==
Player	Team
Paisley Barela	Houston Christian
Jordan Bushnell	Houston Christian
Emmy McKeon	Houston Christian
Alexia Murillo	Houston Christian
Ella Remy	Houston Christian
Olivia Rossman	Houston Christian
Kendall Hemperley	Northwestern State
Alex Bayouth	Stephen F. Austin
Taylor Dodson	Stephen F. Austin
Sierra McCluer	Stephen F. Austin
Erin Morgan	Stephen F. Austin

* Offensive MVP
^ Defensive MVP
