= 2016 Southland Conference women's soccer tournament =

- Classification: Division I
- Teams: 6
- Matches: 5
- Site: Dugan Stadium; Corpus Christi, Texas
- Champions: Houston Baptist (2nd title)
- Winning coach: Misty Jones (2nd title)
- MVP: Allison Abendschein (Houston Baptist)
- Broadcast: Southland Digital Network; ESPN3 (Final)

2016 Southland Conference women's soccer standings
	Conf.						Overall
Team	W		L		T	PCT	W		L		T	PCT
Central Arkansas ‍†‍‍	10	–	0	–	1	.955	15	–	4	–	1	.775
Stephen F. Austin ‍‍‍	9	–	2	–	0	.818	13	–	5	–	0	.722
Abilene Christian* ‍‍‍	8	–	2	–	1	.773	9	–	8	–	2	.526
Northwestern State ‍‍‍	7	–	3	–	1	.682	10	–	8	–	1	.553
Houston Baptist ‍‍‡‍^{y}	5	–	5	–	1	.500	10	–	11	–	1	.477
McNeese State ‍‍‍	4	–	6	–	1	.409	9	–	10	–	1	.475
Southeastern Louisiana ‍‍‍	4	–	6	–	1	.409	7	–	11	–	2	.400
Nicholls State ‍‍‍	3	–	6	–	2	.364	6	–	8	–	2	.438
Incarnate Word* ‍‍‍	3	–	7	–	1	.318	4	–	11	–	2	.294
Texas A&M–Corpus Christi ‍‍‍	3	–	7	–	1	.318	3	–	14	–	1	.194
Sam Houston State ‍‍‍	2	–	8	–	1	.227	2	–	16	–	1	.132
Lamar ‍‍‍	1	–	7	–	3	.227	2	–	14	–	3	.184
† – Conference champion ‡ – 2016 Southland Tournament champion y – Invited to the NCAA Tournament * – Abilene Christian and Incarnate Word ineligible for postseason (D2 to D1 regulations); As of 2016-11-14; Rankings from NSCAA

The 2016 Southland Conference women's soccer tournament was the postseason women's soccer tournament for the Southland Conference held from November 2 to 6, 2016. The five match tournament was at Jack Dugan Stadium in Corpus Christi, Texas. The six team single-elimination tournament consisted of three rounds based on seeding from regular season conference play. The Southeastern Louisiana Lady Lions were the defending tournament champions, after defeating the Sam Houston State Bearkats in a penalty kick shootout in the championship match.

== Bracket ==
First round Wednesday, Nov. 2
4	Houston Baptist	2
5	SE Louisiana	1
3	Northwestern State	0
6	McNeese State	1^{OT}

Semifinals; Friday, Nov. 4
1	Central Arkansas	0
4	Houston Baptist	2
2	Stephen F. Austin	4
6	McNeese State	2

Final; Sunday, Nov. 6
4	Houston Baptist	1
2	Stephen F. Austin	0

== Schedule ==
=== First round ===
November 2, 2016	#3 Northwestern State	0–1 (a.e.t.)	#6 McNeese State	Corpus Christi, Texas
4:00 p.m. CST		Report	Dayna Garcia 94'	Stadium: Dugan Stadium; Referee: Mike Lavergne

November 2, 2016	#4 Houston Baptist	2–1	#5 Southeastern Louisiana	Corpus Christi, Texas
7:00 p.m. CST	Ellee Hall 21'; Allison Abendschein 77'	Report	Amber Marinero 15'	Stadium: Dugan Stadium; Referee: Gregorio Garza

=== Semifinals ===
November 4, 2016	#2 Stephen F. Austin	4–2	#6 McNeese State	Corpus Christi, Texas
4:00 p.m. CST	Breanna Moore 32'; Meghan Corder 43'; Hanna Barker 44'; Julianna Echavarry 72'	Report	Rachel Palet 11'; Savannah LaRicci 90'	Stadium: Dugan Stadium; Referee: Mark Herrington

November 4, 2016	#1 Central Arkansas	0–2	#4 Houston Baptist	Corpus Christi, Texas
7:00 p.m. CST		Report	Ellee Hall 18'; Sabriah Spencer 55'	Stadium: Dugan Stadium; Referee: Rosendo Mendoza

=== Final ===
November 6, 2016	#2 Stephen F. Austin	0–1	#4 Houston Baptist	Corpus Christi, Texas
1:00 p.m. CST		Report	Allison Abendschein 4'	Stadium: Dugan Stadium; Referee: Kyle Phillips

== All-Tournament team ==
Player	Team
**Allison Abendschein**	Houston Baptist
Alanis Guevara	Houston Baptist
Kristi O'Brien	Houston Baptist
Sabriah Spencer	Houston Baptist
Aliessia Dal Monte	Houston Baptist
Elle Hall	Houston Baptist
Hanna Barker	Stephen F. Austin
Lillie Ehlert	Stephen F. Austin
Breanna Moore	Stephen F. Austin
Brooke Dunnigan	Stephen F. Austin
Rachel Palet	McNeese

MVP in bold
