= Hanna Barker =

American soccer player (born 1996)

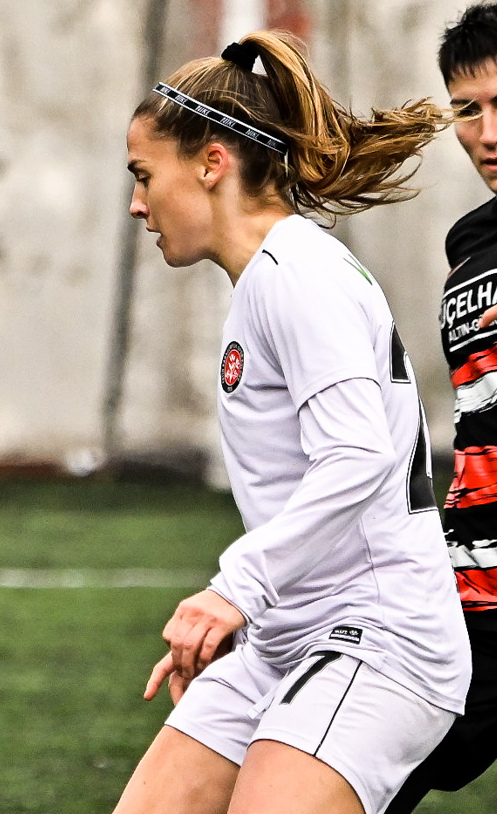
- Barker with Fatih Karagümrük in 2024

Personal information
- Full name: Hanna Marie Barker
- Date of birth: May 14, 1996 (age 30)
- Place of birth: Farmers Branch, Texas, United States
- Height: 5 ft 2 in (1.57 m)
- Positions: Midfielder; forward

Team information
- Current team: Napoli
- Number: 7

Youth career
- D'Feeters Kicks SC

College career
Years	Team	Apps	(Gls)
2014–2017	SFA Ladyjacks	78	(29)

Senior career*
Years	Team	Apps	(Gls)
2018	FH Hafnarfjarðar	13	(1)
2018	→IR Reykjavíkur	7	(2)
2018–2022	Diósgyőri VTK	73	(35)
2022–2023	Ferencvárosi TC	27	(6)
2023–2024	Fatih Karagümrük S.K.	30	(8)
2024–2025	Fatih Vatan	5	(6)
2025–	Napoli	7	(1)
- * Club domestic league appearances and goals as of 15:38, December 21, 2025 (UTC)

Hanna Marie Barker (born May 14, 1996) is an American professional soccer player who plays as a midfielder or forward for Italian Serie A club Napoli.

== Early life ==
Barker started her soccer career in 2006 playing in her hometown for 96 D'Feeters Kicks SC in the Elite Clubs National League (ECNL).

From 2012 to 2014, she was part of the Turner High School girls team. She was named twice All-district offensive and Team MVP in 2012 and 2013.

During her university years, Barker was a member of the college soccer team SFA Ladyjaks. She was selected to the Southland Conference All-Tournament Team and was named Southland Conference Freshman of the Year in 2014, Southland Conference Midfielder of the Year in 2016 and 2017. She netted in total 29 goals in 78 matches of the Southland Conference women's soccer tournament.

== Club career ==
In February 2018, she went to Iceland, and signed a professional contract with FH Hafnarfjarðar to play in the Besta deild kvenna.

The same year, she was loaned out to IR Reykjavíkur in the 1. deild kvenna league.

She moved to Hungary, and joined Diósgyőri VTK to play in the 2018–19 league season of Nemzeti Bajnokság I, where she scored in total 35 goals in 73 matches of four seasons.

She played for Ferencvárosi TC in the Hungarian league Női NB I of the 2022–23 season. She scored six goals in 27 matches. She took part in two matches of the Tournament 2 at the 2022–23 UEFA Women's Champions League, and scored one goal.

In August 2023, Barker moved to Turkey, and signed with the Istanbul-based club Fatih Karagümrük S.K.

For the 2024-25 Turkish Super League season, she transferred to Fatih Vatan, also in Istanbul.

On 17 July 2025, Barker was transferred to Italian Serie A club Napoli.

== Honors ==
SFA Ladyjacks

- Southland Conference runner-up: 2016, 2017

Ferencvárosi

- Női NB I: 2022–23

Individual

- Southland Conference Freshman of the Year: 2014
- Southland Conference Midfielder of the Year: 2016, 2017
