= Houston Christian Huskies women's soccer =

American college soccer team

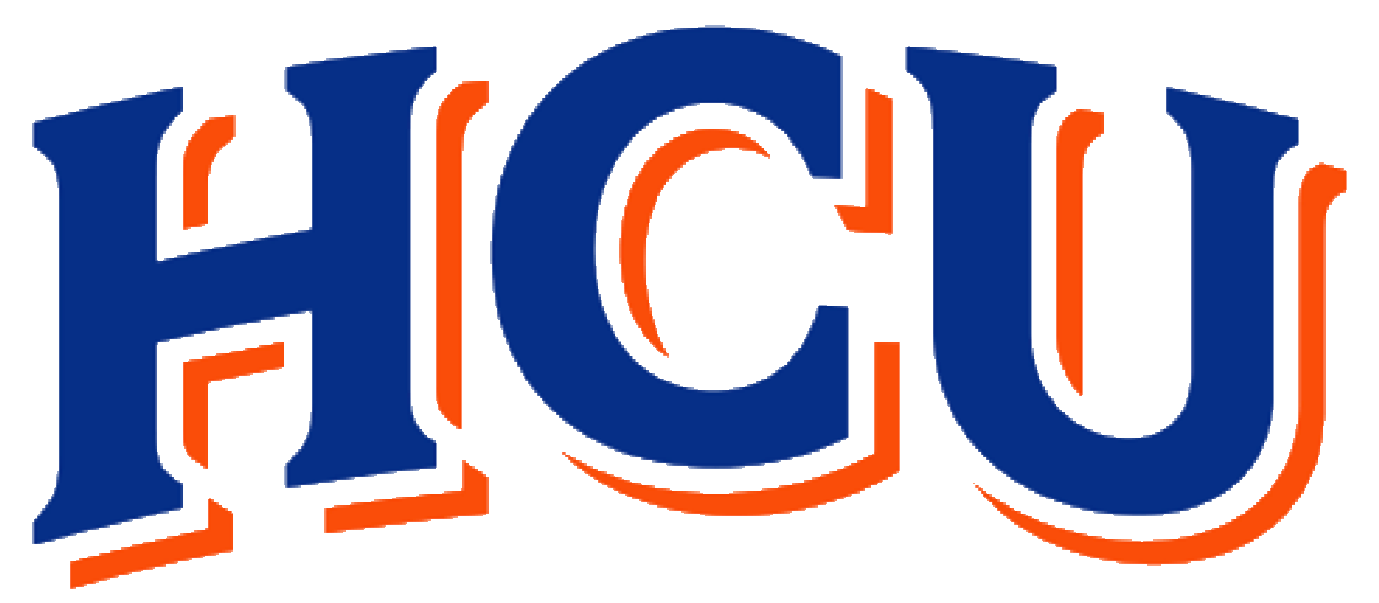
- Founded: 1986; 40 years ago
- University: Houston Christian University
- Athletic director: Steve Moniaci
- Head coach: Nick Whiting (3rd season)
- Conference: Southland
- Location: Houston, Texas, US
- Stadium: Sorrels Field (capacity: 500)
- Nickname: Huskies
- Colors: Royal blue and orange
Home	Away

NCAA tournament appearances
- 2014, 2016

Conference tournament championships
- 2010, 2014, 2026

Conference regular season championships
- 2010

The Houston Christian Huskies women's soccer is the team that represents Houston Christian University in NCAA Division I college soccer. The team, currently led by their head coach Nick Whiting, as they compete in the Southland Conference. The team's initial season was 1986. The Huskies' home stadium is the Sorrels Field which is located on the university's campus. The team began playing home games there starting with the 2007 season.

== History ==
Houston Christian University first sponsored soccer in 1986. The team has had four head coaches since its beginning.

- David Swonke, the first head coach, led the Huskies in their first two seasons, 1986 and 1987. The program was discontinued following the 1987 season.
- Misty Jones served as head coach from 2006 to 2021. Under Jones, the Huskies won the Great West Conference championship in 2010. The Huskies also won the 2014 and 2016 Southland Conference women's soccer tournament earning the conference auto-bid to the 2014 and 2016 NCAA tournaments.
- Chris Dodd led the Huskies from 2022 to 2023. The team reached the conference tournament semi-final round each year.
- Nick Whiting was named Huskies head coach on April 16, 2024.

== Players ==
=== Current roster ===
As of Dec 2024

Note: Flags indicate national team as defined under FIFA eligibility rules; some limited exceptions apply. Players may hold more than one non-FIFA nationality.

No.	Pos.	Nation	Player
0	GK	USA	Taylor Howard
1	GK	USA	Maddie Rich
2	DF	USA	Acacia Weis
3	MF	USA	Mariana Cardenas
4	DF	USA	Annika Kassenbrock
4	DF	USA	Reagan Adair
6	MF	USA	Kaitlyn Niemeyer
7	MF	USA	Alana Clark
8	DF	USA	Kaya Williams
9	FW	USA	Isela Ramirez
10	MF	USA	Mia Ferrell
11	FW	USA	Aaliyah Pena
12	MF	USA	Trinity Clark
12	MF	USA	Viviana Duarte

No.	Pos.	Nation	Player
14	DF	USA	Ella Carmody
15	DF	USA	Payton Joost
16	DF	USA	Olivia Smith
18	DF	USA	Arely Alaniz
19	MF	GHA	Rafiatu Alhassan
20	DF	USA	Marina Poljak
21	FW	USA	Taylor Conway
23	DF	USA	Anneliese Switzer
24	DF	USA	Lauryn Woodard
25	MF	USA	Erin Dull
26	DF	USA	Ayvah Angala
28	MF	USA	Riley Wilson
30	GK	USA	Jaliyah Clark
31	DF	USA	Reese Carmody

=== Coaching staff ===
Position	Staff
Athletic director	(United States) Steve Moniaci
Head coach	(United States) Nick Whiting
Assistant coach	(United States) Quentin Boric
Assistant coach	(United States) Howard Sturgeon

== Stadium ==
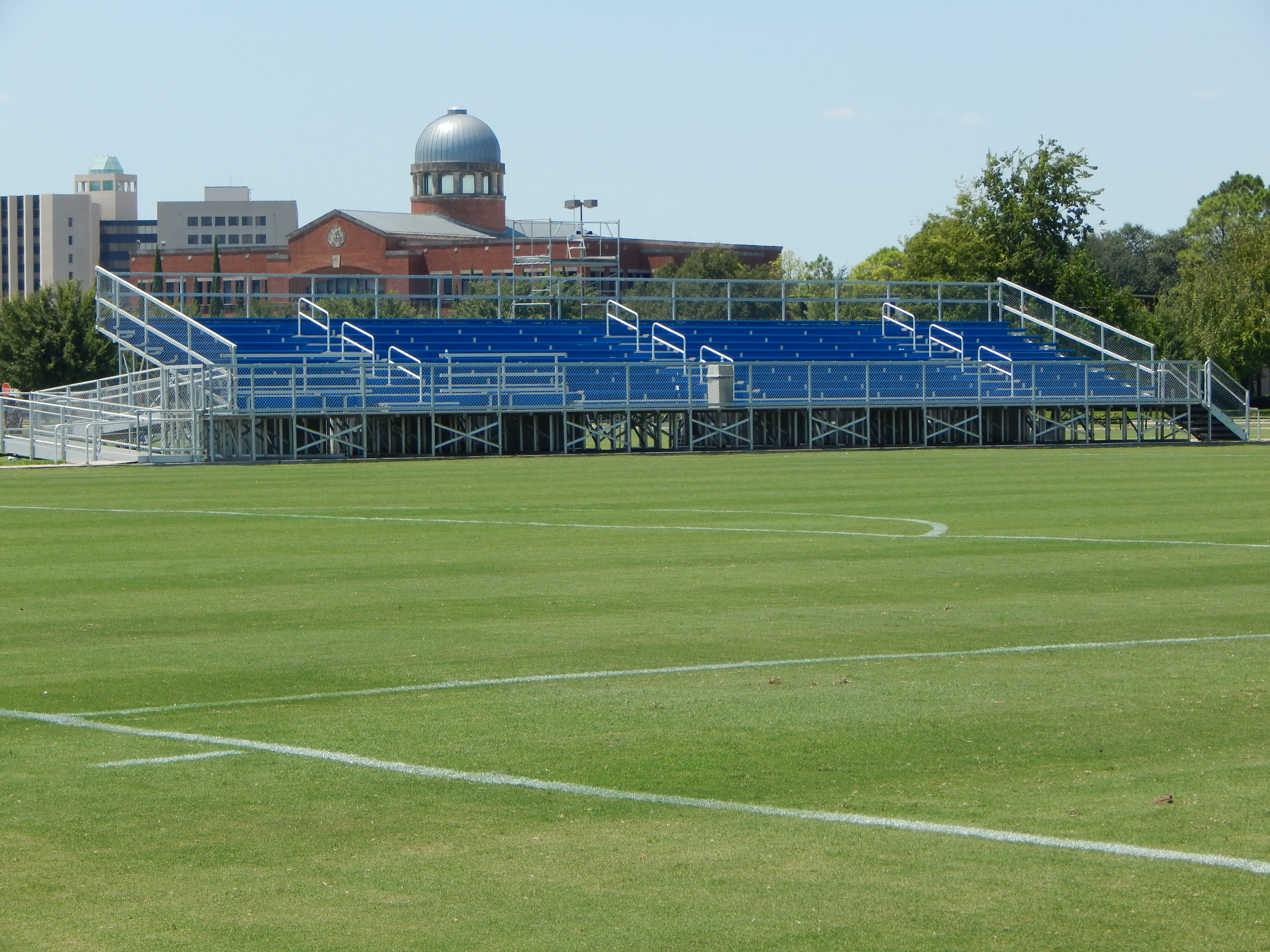
Sorrels Field, HCU's soccer venue

Located on the Houston Christian University campus, Sorrels Field opened in 2007. Approximate field dimensions are 115 yards x 70 yards. Stadium features include permanent bleacher seating for 500 and covered benches for both teams. The stadium has an electronic scoreboard and lighting for night games. The playing field is natural grass turf for both the competition field and practice field which is located behind the grandstands.

== NCAA Year-by-year results ==
Season	Conference	Coach	Overall				Conference				Notes
Season	Conference	Coach	Games	Win	Loss	Tie	Games	Win	Loss	Tie	Notes
1986	Independent	David Swonke	6	0	6	0	-	-	-	-	-
1987	Independent	David Swonke	7	0	7	0	-	-	-	-	-
		David Swonke	13	0	13	0	-	-	-	-	Program discontinued
2006	Red River Athletic Conference	Misty Jones	17	11	6	0	9	4	3	0	Conference tournament runner-up
2007	Independent	Misty Jones	19	11	5	3	-	-	-	-	-
2008	Independent	Misty Jones	17	9	7	1	-	-	-	-	-
2009	Great West Conference	Misty Jones	21	9	9	3	6	3	1	2	
2010	Great West Conference	Misty Jones	22	7	13	2	6	2	4	0	Conference tournament champions
2011	Great West Conference	Misty Jones	20	10	7	3	5	6	1	1	
2012	Great West Conference	Misty Jones	20	10	7	3	5	4	1	0	
2013	Southland Conference	Misty Jones	19	5	12	2	12	4	7	1	
2014	Southland	Misty Jones	22	10	7	5	11	7	1	3	SLC tournament champion, NCAA tournament first round
2015	Southland	Misty Jones	17	10	6	1	11	8	3	0	
2016	Southland	Misty Jones	22	10	11	1	11	5	5	1	
2017	Southland	Misty Jones	22	10	7	5	11	7	1	3	SLC tournament champion, NCAA tournament first round
2018	Southland	Misty Jones	19	10	8	1	11	8	2	1	
2019	Southland	Misty Jones	18	3	15	0	11	2	9	0	
2020	Southland	Misty Jones	15	3	10	2	11	3	7	1	
		Misty Jones	285	125	132	28	-	-	-	-	
2021	Southland	Chris Dodd	19	4	14	1	12	4	8	0	
2022	Southland	Chris Dodd	20	7	10	3	12	6	5	1	
2023	Southland	Chris Dodd	18	7	11	0	10	4	6	0	
		Chris Dodd	47	19	32	6	-	-	-	-	

(Results reflect games through Nov 3, 2023.)

== Post season appearances ==
=== Houston Christian Huskies in the NCAA Tournament ===
- The NCAA Division I women's soccer tournament started in 1982.
- The format of the tournament has changed through the years.

Year	Record	Pct	Notes
2014	0–1	.000	College Station, TX Regional; Lost to #3 Texas A&M (0–5)
2016	0–1	.000	Stanford, CA Regional; Lost to #1 Stanford (0–5)
TOTALS	0–2	.000	2 NCAA Division I Tournament Appearances

Note: Houston Baptist University changed its name to Houston Christian University on September 21, 2022.

== Awards and honors ==
=== All Region selections ===
- Ellee Hall 2017 (3rd)
- Blake Martin 2015 (3rd)
- Baylii Bieke 2018

=== Academic All District ===
- Morgan Dean 2014
- Blake Martin 2015
- Megan Rickert 2019

=== Southland Conference ===
==== All Conference First Team ====
- Sabriah Spencer 2015
- Blake Martin 2015
- Baylii Bieke 2018
- Kat Lazor 2023

==== All Conference Second Team ====
- Natalie Hager 2014
- Kristi O'Brien 2014
- Lindsay Matlock 2014
- Elizabeth Adams 2015
- Baylii Bieke 2017
- Ellee Hall 2017
- Autumn Wildung 2017
- Sabriah Spencer 2018
- Ryan Ford 2021
- Katie Marker 2021
- Noor Abukishk 2021
- Mia Salas 2022
- Kat Lazor 2022
- Alexa Huerta 2023

==== All Conference Third Team ====
- Megan Rickert 2020
- Mia Salas 2021
- Talin Rizo 2021
