= Sam Houston Bearkats track and field =

American college track and field team

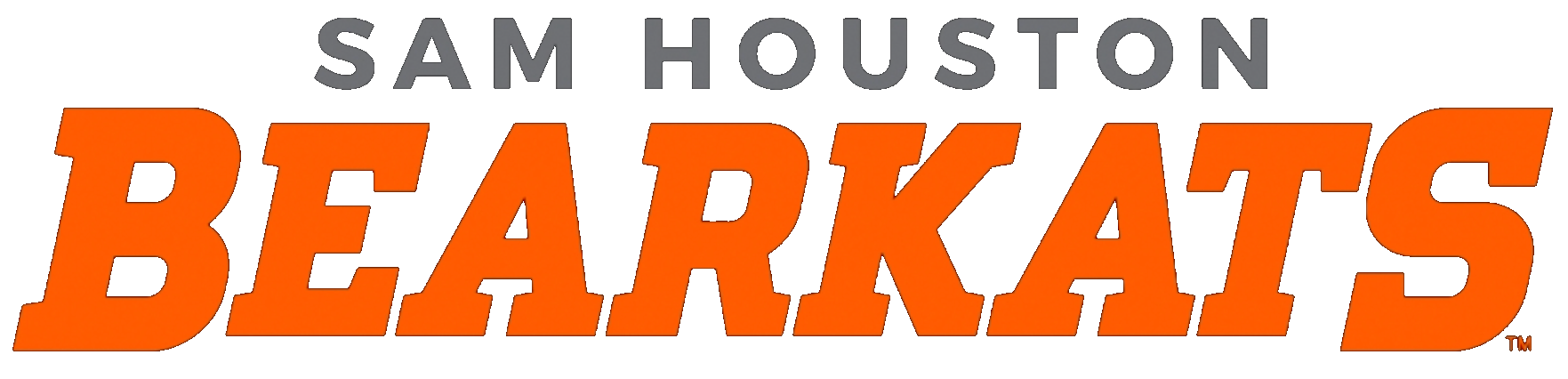
- University: Sam Houston State University
- Head coach: David Self
- Conference: C-USA
- Location: Huntsville, Texas
- Outdoor track: Meredith & Miriam York Track & Field Complex
- Nickname: Bearkats
- Colors: Orange and white

The Sam Houston Bearkats track and field team is the track and field program that represents Sam Houston State University. The Bearkats compete in NCAA Division I as a member of the Conference USA. The team is based in Huntsville, Texas, at the Meredith & Miriam York Track & Field Complex.

The program is coached by David Self. The track and field program officially encompasses four teams because the NCAA considers men's and women's indoor track and field and outdoor track and field as separate sports.

Pole vaulter Clayton Fritsch became the program's most successful athlete at the NCAA level, finishing runner-up at the 2022 NCAA Division I Outdoor Track and Field Championships.

== Postseason ==
As of August 2025, a total of 4 men and 6 women have achieved individual first-team All-American status for the team at the Division I men's outdoor, women's outdoor, men's indoor, or women's indoor national championships (using the modern criteria of top-8 placing regardless of athlete nationality).

First team NCAA All-Americans
Team	Championships	Name	Event	Place	Ref.
Women's	2001 Outdoor	Precious Madison	Long jump	8th	
Women's	2006 Outdoor	Roshunda Betts	Javelin throw	5th	
Women's	2007 Outdoor	Jennie Sewell	Pole vault	5th	
Men's	2010 Indoor	Michael Courtney	400 meters	4th	
Men's	2011 Outdoor	Chris Cralle	Hammer throw	7th	
Women's	2016 Indoor	Ashley Jenkins	Weight throw	4th	
Women's	2016 Outdoor	Danielle Demas	100 meters hurdles	7th	
Men's	2018 Indoor	Tyler Adams	Heptathlon	3rd	
Men's	2019 Indoor	Clayton Fritsch	Pole vault	7th	
Men's	2019 Outdoor	Clayton Fritsch	Pole vault	3rd	
Men's	2021 Indoor	Clayton Fritsch	Pole vault	7th	
Men's	2021 Outdoor	Clayton Fritsch	Pole vault	4th	
Men's	2022 Indoor	Clayton Fritsch	Pole vault	3rd	
Women's	2022 Indoor	KeAyla Dove	Shot put	5th	
Men's	2022 Outdoor	Clayton Fritsch	Pole vault	2nd	

== See also ==
- Category:Sam Houston Bearkats men's track and field athletes (4)
