= Lamar Soccer Complex =

Soccer facility in Beaumont, Texas

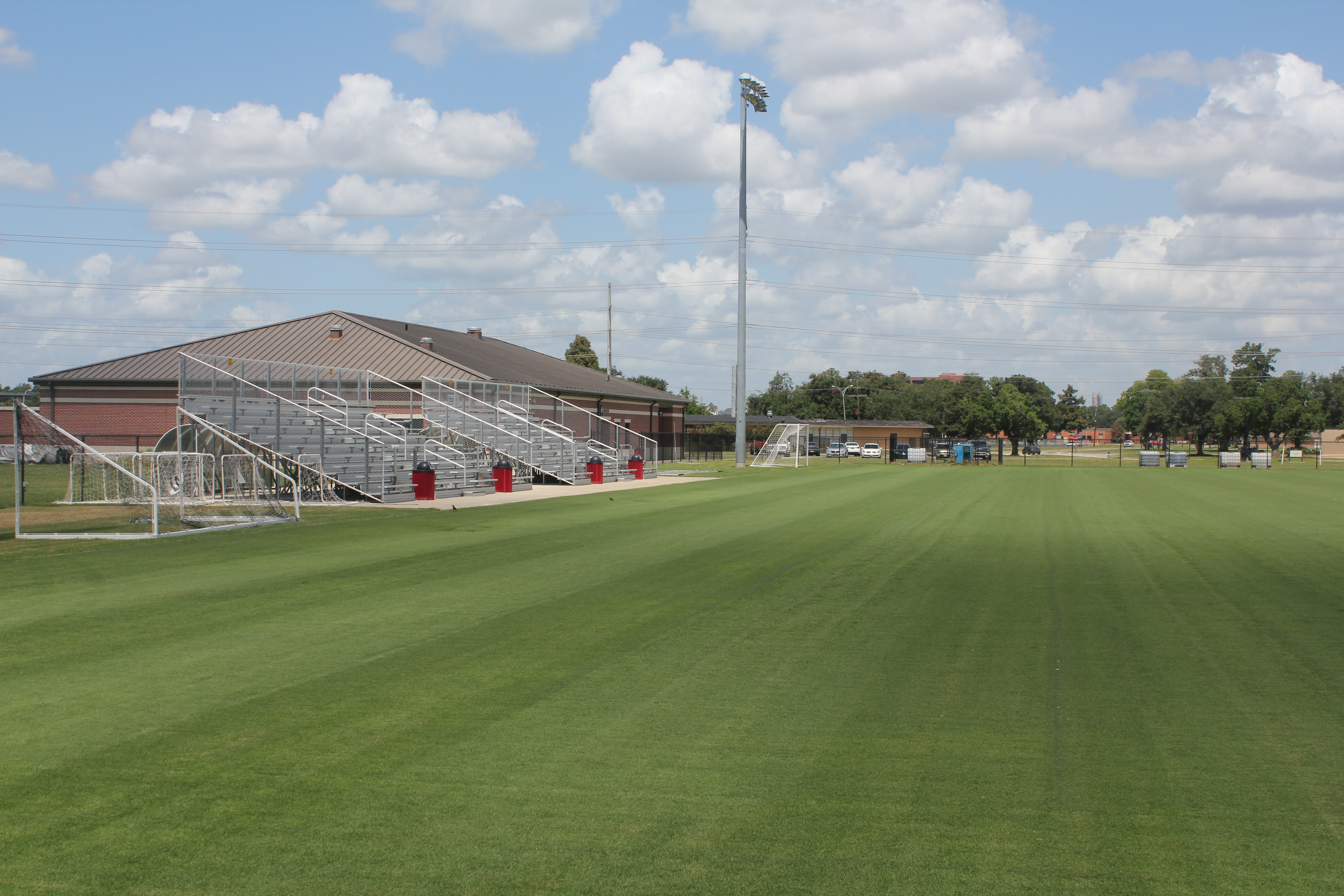
- View of stadium's field and stands in 2014
- Interactive map of Lamar Soccer Complex
- Address: On Rolfe Christopher Dr north of US 69, 96, 287 Freeway (Cardinal Drive); Beaumont, TX; United States
- Coordinates: 30°02′01.3″N 94°04′19.1″W
- Owner: Lamar University
- Operator: Lamar Athletics
- Seating type: bleacher bench
- Capacity: 500
- Type: Stadium
- Surface: Grass
- Scoreboard: electronic, digital
- Record attendance: 994; August 15, 2024 vs Texas A&M
- Field size: 115 x 70 yards
- Current use: Soccer

Construction
- Built: 2009
- Opened: September 25, 2009; 16 years ago
- Cost: $3,724,920
- Architect: Leo A Daly
- Main contractor: Pepper-Lawson Construction

Tenant
- Lamar Cardinals women's soccer (NCAA)

Website
- lamarcardinals.com/lu-soccer-complex

The Lamar Soccer Complex is a soccer-specific stadium located on the campus of Lamar University in Beaumont, Texas. The venue serves as home for the Division I (NCAA) Lamar Cardinals women's soccer team. The stadium has a permanent seating capacity of 500. Stadium features include covered benches for both the home and visiting teams, lighting, and a programmable fertilization and irrigation system. Construction of the stadium began on June 15, 2009. Construction cost of the soccer field and adjacent Lamar Soccer and Softball Complex building was $3,724,920. The stadium and supporting Lamar Soccer and Softball Complex building were part of a $29 million athletic construction project.

The first match at the new stadium was a 2–1 loss against the New Mexico State Aggies on September 25, 2009. Official attendance for the opening game was 513.

== Post Season play ==
The stadium served as the site of the 2014 and 2018 Southland Conference soccer tournaments.

== Yearly attendance ==
Below is the Lady Cardinals' yearly home attendance at the Lamar Soccer Complex.

Home attendance
Season	Average	Highest
2023	506	636
2022	438	702
2021	172	263
2020	75*	75*
2019	245	505
2018	333	588
2017	299	695
2016	250	433
2015	326	602
2014	237	323
2013	321	493
2012	261	362
2011	353	527
2010	400	562
2009	321	513

* Stadium capacity limited to 75 due to COVID19 precautions
The attendance record of 702 was set vs Incarnate Word on September 30, 2022.

== Lamar Soccer and Softball Complex building ==
The Lamar Soccer and Softball Complex building is located in between the soccer stadium and the Lamar Softball Complex. The building, over 11,000 square feet in size, serves both softball and soccer. It includes coaches offices, academic study areas, laundry facilities, equipment storage, home and visitor locker rooms, concessions, public restrooms, and a training facility, one of four training facilities on campus.

== See also ==
- List of soccer stadiums in the United States
