= Houston Christian Huskies =

Intercollegiate sports teams of Houston Christian University

- University: Houston Christian University
- NCAA: Division I (FCS)
- Conference: Southland (primary); OVC (men's soccer)
- Athletic director: Stan Williamson
- Location: Houston, Texas
- First season: 1963
- Varsity teams: 15 (7 men's, 8 women's)
- Football stadium: Husky Stadium
- Basketball arena: Sharp Gymnasium
- Baseball stadium: Husky Baseball Field
- Softball stadium: Husky Softball Field
- Soccer stadium: Sorrels Field
- Nickname: Huskies
- Colors: Royal blue and orange
- Fight song: Get Up and Go, You Mighty Huskies
- Website: hcuhuskies.com
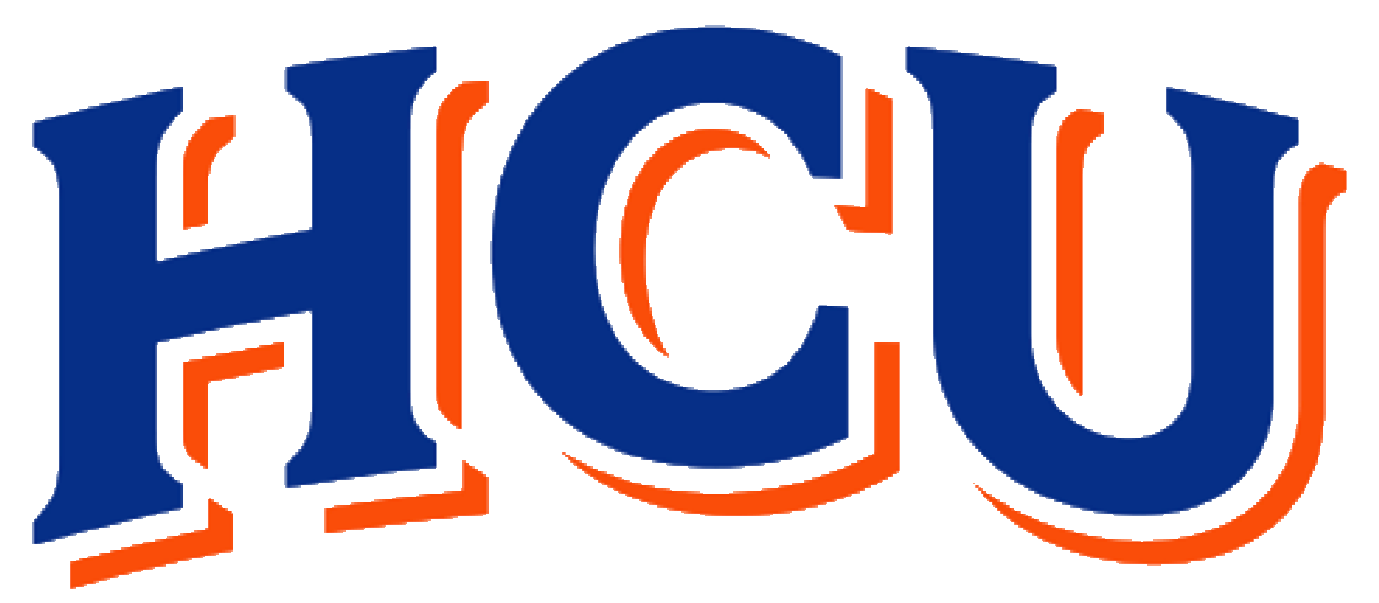

The Houston Christian Huskies, HCU or Huskies (formerly known as Houston Baptist, HBU) are the athletic teams that represent Houston Christian University, located in Houston, Texas, in intercollegiate sports as a member of the Division I level of the National Collegiate Athletic Association (NCAA), primarily competing in the Southland Conference for most of its sports since the 2013–14 academic year; as of the current 2023 NCAA soccer season, its men's soccer team competes in the Ohio Valley Conference (OVC). The Huskies previously competed the D-I Great West Conference from 2008–09 to 2012–13 after spending one season as an NCAA D-I Independent during the 2007–08 school year (since returning to NCAA D-I as a transitional member); in the Red River Athletic Conference (RRAC) of the National Association of Intercollegiate Athletics (NAIA) from 1998–99 to 2006–07; and as an NAIA Independent from 1989–90 to 1997–98. Houston Christian's (HCU) official school colors are royal blue and orange.

== History ==
From the inception of the athletics program at the university in 1963 until 1965, the then-Spartans competed as a junior college independent. Houston Baptist College became a four-year university in fall 1965 and their mascot was changed to the Huskies. The Huskies were members of the NCAA College Division from 1969 until 1973 when the NCAA restructured their divisions into Divisions I, II, and III. The Huskies were an NCAA Division I team from 1973-1990. After playing for seventeen years as a member of the NAIA, the Huskies began play as an NCAA Division I team again in 2007 and became a full member of the NCAA for the 2011–12 academic year.

After one year of independent status in the NCAA, HCU joined the Great West Conference, and began play as a member in 2008 for all sports but basketball, baseball, softball, volleyball, and women's soccer. These teams remained independent until the 2009–2010 season when they joined the other HCU teams. Men's soccer joined the Mountain Pacific Sports Federation since the Great West did not sponsor the sport.

On November 9, 2011, officials from the Southland Conference visited HCU in their expansion drive. On November 21, Houston Baptist accepted an invitation to join the Southland Conference joining July 1, 2013. The school started a football program in 2013 and began Southland play in 2014. There are also plans for a new basketball arena. With the Mountain Pacific Sports Federation dropping men's soccer after the 2012 season, the HCU team moved to the Western Athletic Conference, which began sponsoring the sport from 2013 onwards.

The men's soccer program remained in the WAC through the 2022 season, after which it joined the newly formed men's soccer league of the Ohio Valley Conference.

== Conference affiliations ==
NCAA

- NCAA College Division Independent (1969-1973)
- NCAA Division I Independent (1973-1978)
- Trans America Athletic Conference (1978–1989)
- NCAA Division I Independent (2007–2008)
- Great West Conference (2008–2013)
- Southland Conference (2013–present)

NAIA

- Red River Athletic Conference (1998–2007)

== Varsity teams ==
HCU competes in 17 intercollegiate varsity sports: Men's sports include baseball, basketball, cross country, football, golf, soccer and track and field (indoor and outdoor); while women's sports include basketball, beach volleyball, cross country, golf, soccer, softball, track and field (indoor and outdoor) and volleyball.

Men's sports	Women's sports
Baseball	Basketball
Basketball	Beach volleyball
Cross country	Cross country
Football	Golf
Golf	Soccer
Soccer	Softball
Track and field^{1}	Track and field^{1}
	Volleyball
^{1} – includes both indoor and outdoor

== Venues and facilities ==
Venue	Sport(s) hosted	Opened
Husky Stadium	Football	2014
Sharp Gymnasium	Basketball, volleyball	1964
Husky Baseball Field	Baseball	1993
Husky Softball Field	Softball	1993
Sorrels Field	Soccer	2007

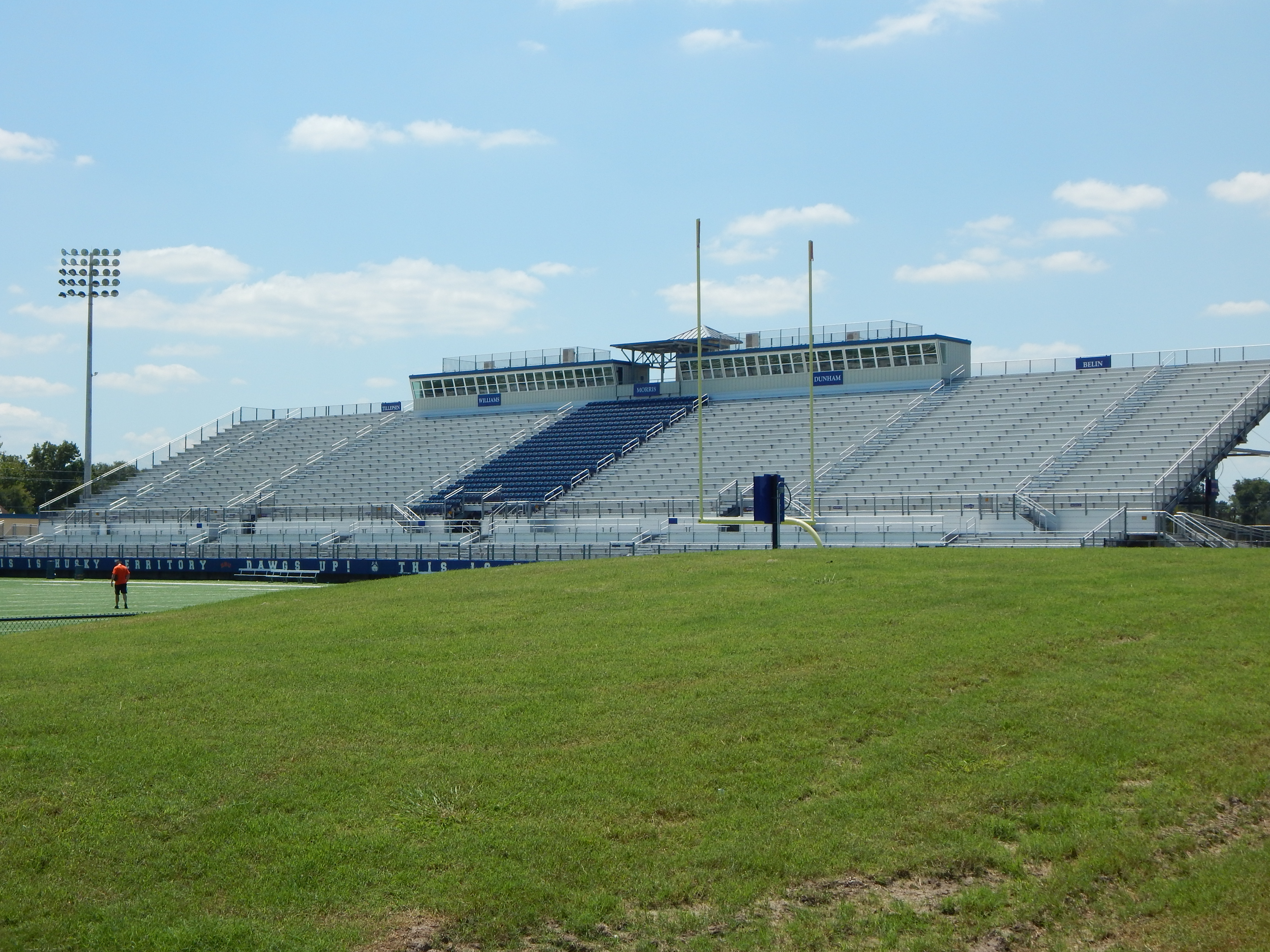
Husky Stadium

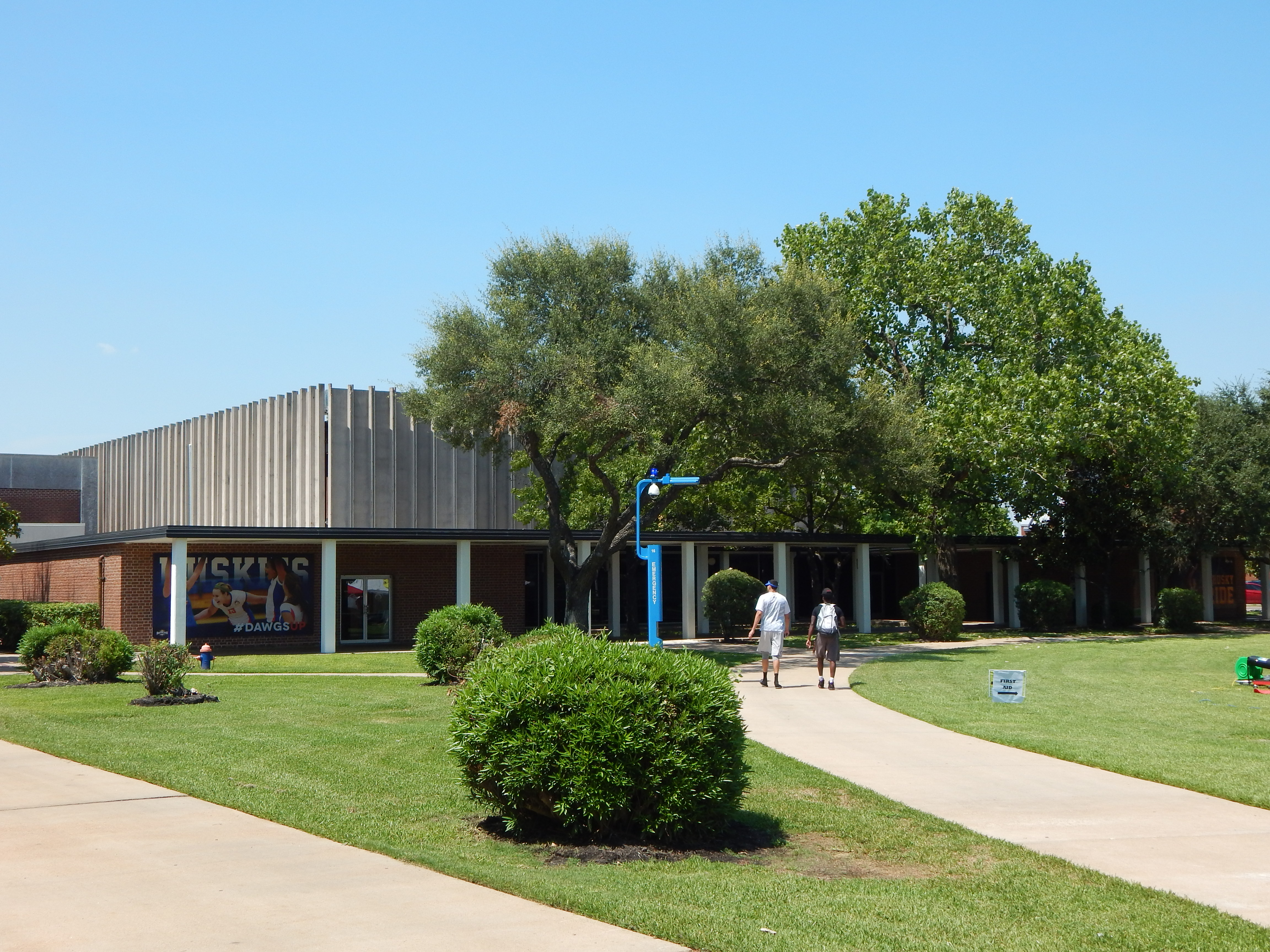
Sharp Gymnasium

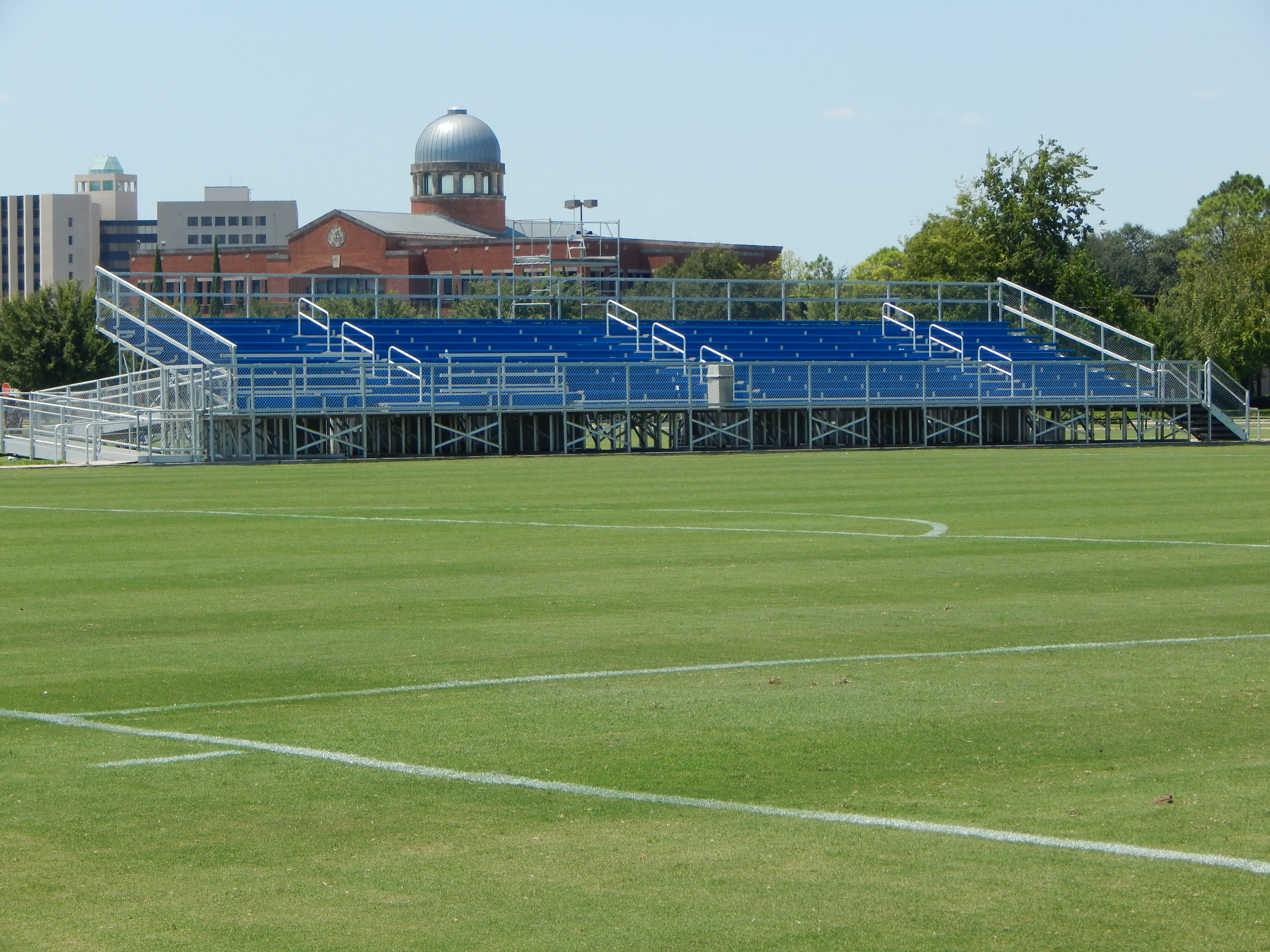
Sorrels Field

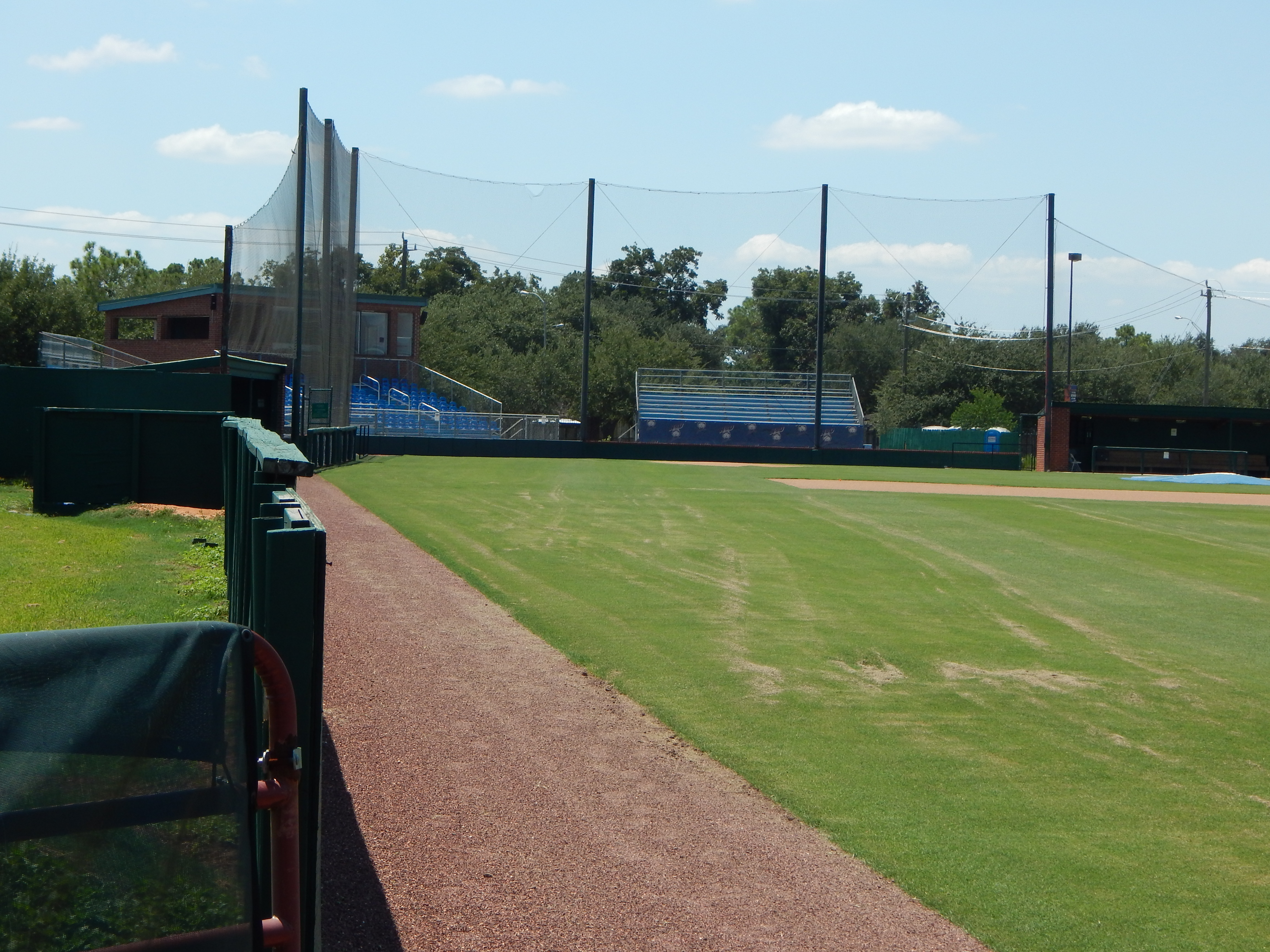
Husky Baseball Field

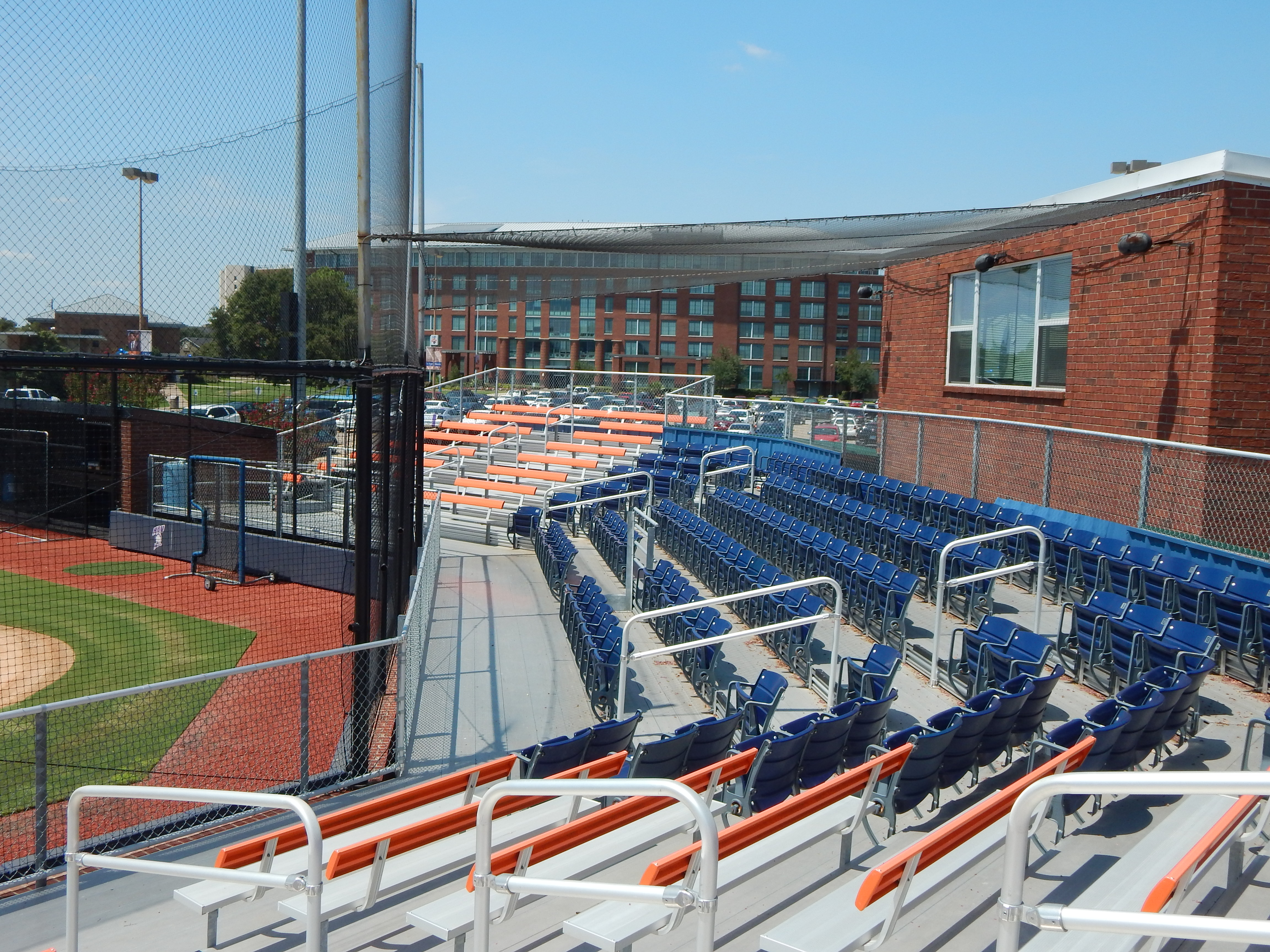
Husky Softball Field

== See also ==
- List of NCAA Division I institutions
