= Sam Houston Bearkats =

Collegiate sports club in the United States

- University: Sam Houston State University
- Conference: Conference USA
- NCAA: Division I (FBS)
- Athletic director: Bobby Williams
- Location: Huntsville, Texas
- Varsity teams: 17 (18 in 2025)
- Football stadium: Bowers Stadium
- Basketball arena: Johnson Coliseum
- Baseball stadium: Don Sanders Stadium
- Softball stadium: Bearkat Softball Complex
- Soccer stadium: Pritchett Field
- Other venues: McAdams Tennis Center; York Track & Field Complex
- Mascot: Sammy Bearkat
- Nickname: Bearkats
- Fight song: Bearkat Fight Song
- Colors: Orange and white
- Website: gobearkats.com
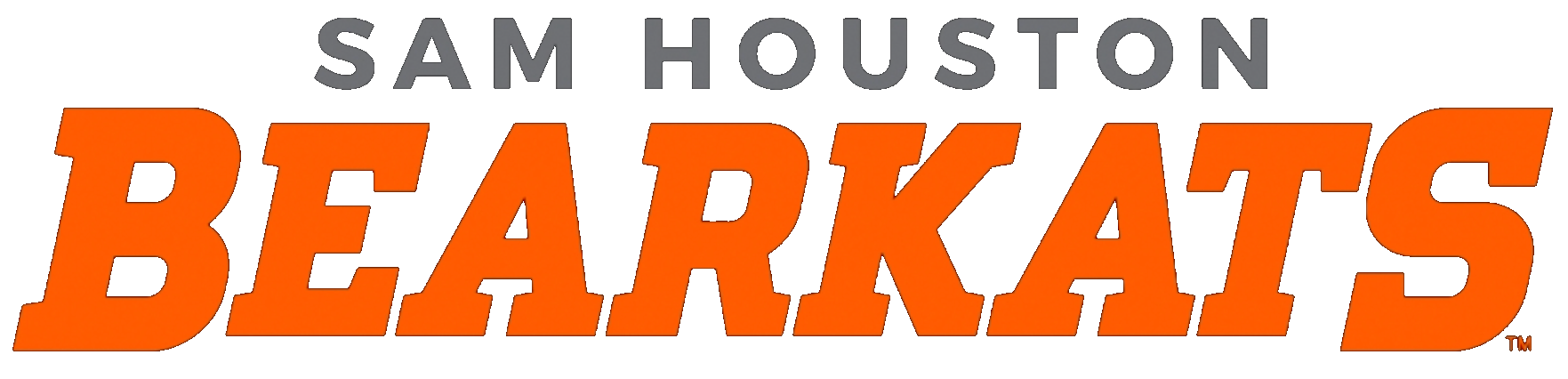

The Sam Houston Bearkats are the intercollegiate athletic teams that represent Sam Houston State University, located in Huntsville, Texas. Sam Houston's colors are orange and white. Sam Houston sports teams participate in NCAA Division I (Football Bowl Subdivision (FBS-formerly known as Division I-A) for football) in Conference USA (CUSA), having joined that conference on July 1, 2023 after spending 34 years in the Southland Conference and two years in the Western Athletic Conference (WAC). SHSU's primary rival is Stephen F. Austin (SFA) and tensions between the two schools can run high before major sporting events that pit one against the other.

As a whole, the Sam Houston athletic department captured the Southland Conference Commissioner's Cup in 2005, 2006, 2007, 2013, 2014, 2018 and 2019 for all-around athletic department and topped the Southland Conference for all-academic recognition. The Kats are the only athletic department in the Southland Conference to get the Commissioner's Cup for 3 consecutive years while the 7 total cups are the most in league history.

Sam Houston's move to the WAC was announced on January 14, 2021 as part of a major expansion of that conference. Also announced as future WAC members were three other Southland members from Texas (Abilene Christian, Lamar, SFA) plus Big Sky Conference member Southern Utah. Initially, all five schools were to join in July 2022, but the entry of SHSU and the other Texas schools was moved to 2021 after the Southland expelled its departing members.

Sam Houston was announced as a future member of Conference USA effective July 1, 2023 on November 5, 2021.

== Sports sponsored ==
Men's sports	Women's sports
Baseball	Basketball
Basketball	Beach volleyball (2025)
Cross country	Bowling
Football	Cross country
Golf	Golf
Track and field^{1}	Soccer
	Softball
	Tennis
	Track and field^{1}
	Volleyball
^{1} – includes both indoor and outdoor

=== Baseball ===
Bryce Johnson, now an outfielder for the San Francisco Giants in Major League Baseball, played for the Bearkats.

=== Basketball ===
Both men's and women's basketball teams hold home games in Bernard Johnson Coliseum located on the campus of Sam Houston State University. Built in 1976, Johnson Coliseum is a 6,100 multi-seat arena that serves as host to both basketball and volleyball home matches.

==== Men's basketball ====
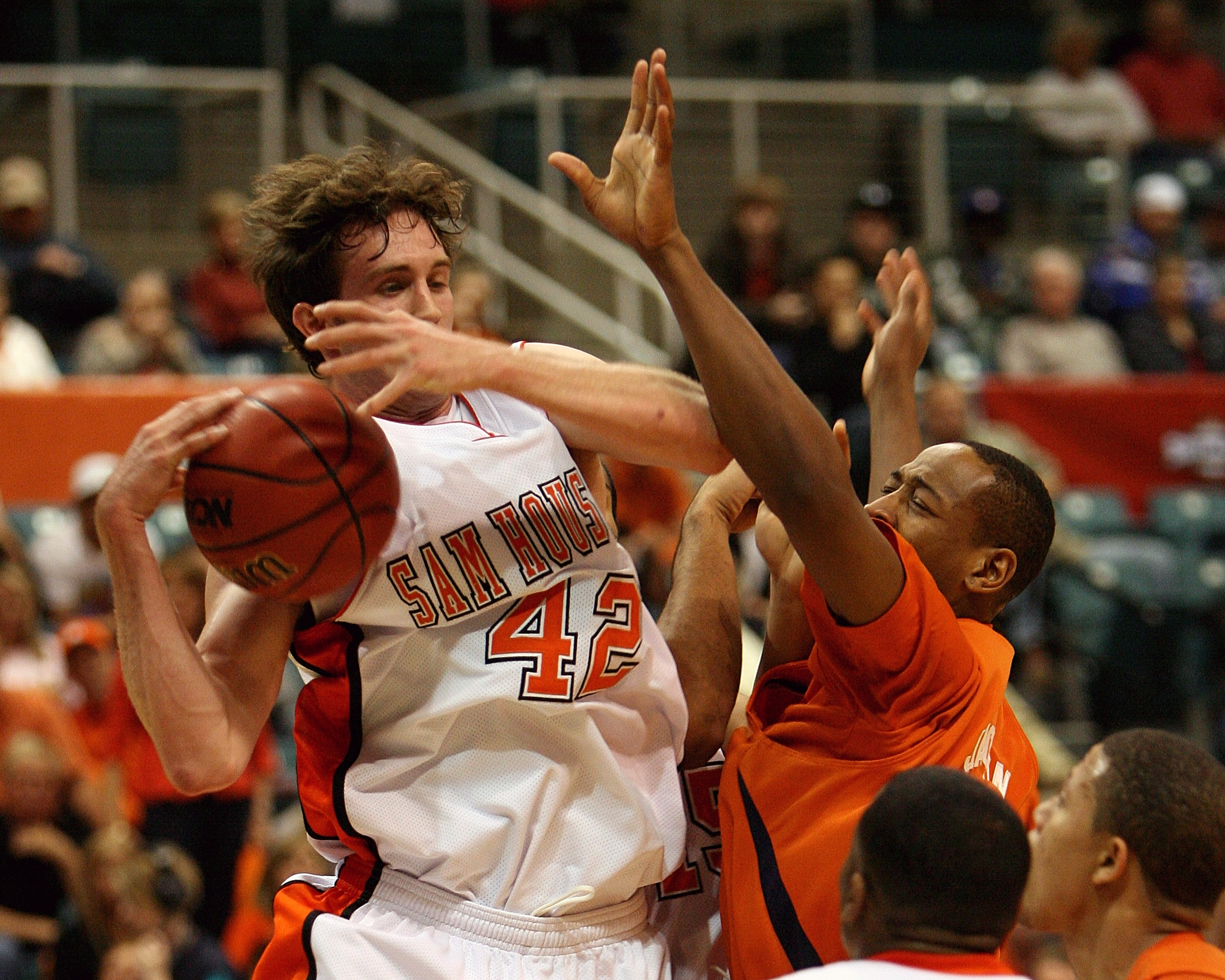
Sam Houston game in 2009

The men's program has been the most consistent in the conference over the past decade under the direction of former head coach Bob Marlin, winning regular season titles in 2000 and 2003 with an NCAA Tournament appearance in 2003 (the first in school history), and again in 2010. The Bearkat men's basketball team has won more games in the 11 seasons under Coach Marlin than any other Southland school. The team also ranks #2 in wins among Division I schools in Texas in the current decade behind the Texas Longhorns. The Bearkat teams under Coach Marlin have compiled five 20-win seasons. Marlin's teams have been the only teams among Texas Division I programs to win at least 2 conference championships in the past 6 seasons. Under the direction of Bob Marlin, Bearkat men's basketball players have broken 23 school records and 30 Division I school records.

Since the departure of Bob Marlin to the University of Louisiana in 2010, the Bearkat Men's Basketball team has been under the direction of Jason Hooten, who had previously served as an assistant under Bob Marlin. In his first year as head coach, Hooten produced an 18–13 record, while garnishing a #3 seed in the Southland Conference tournament.

==== Women's basketball ====
Conference USA logo in Sam Houston State's colors

The women's basketball team began play in 1969 under coach Jody Conradt and were a force in their first 5 seasons with an overall 92–31 record. Under current head coach Brenda Nicholls the Bearkats have seen success in recent years, earning Southland Conference tournament berths in each of the last four seasons, including one regular season conference championship, a tournament final, a Women's Basketball Invitational appearance and a WNIT appearance. In team history, the squad has seen postseason action in 20 seasons, with the most successful run being in 2013 where the Bearkats earned berth into the Women's National Invitation Tournament, where the team lost to Tulane in the opening round, 57–65. The Bearkats lone Women's Basketball conference championship came in 2013. The women's basketball program is among the most efficient programs in NCAA Division I, ranking #2 nationally in cost per win in 2006 at less than $25,000 per win with 18 wins against Division I opponents (21 overall).

=== Football ===
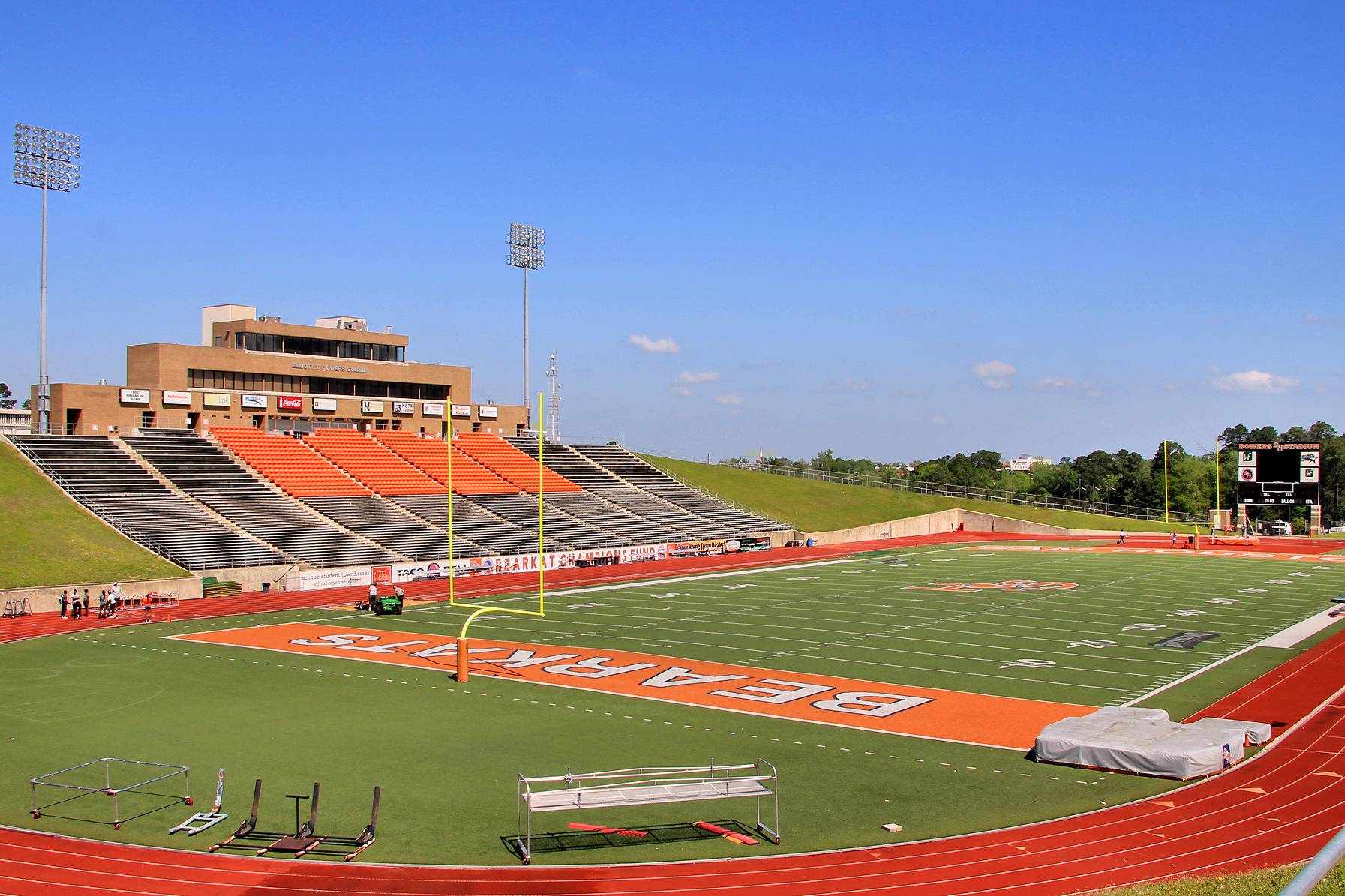
Bowers Stadium, home to the football team

K. C. Keeler is currently the head coach of the Bearkats. Keeler previously coached Delaware to three FCS Championship games, winning one in 2003. The Sam Houston Bearkats won the 2020 NCAA Division I Championship with a 23–21 victory of South Dakota State.

During their time in the FCS, Sam Houston became a powerhouse name in the subdivision. The Bearkats made 11 FCS Playoff appearances between 2000 and 2021, their final season of eligibility in the FCS. In that time frame, the Bearkats boast 22 playoff wins, 8 conference titles, 7 semifinal appearances and a National Championship.

Every year, the "Battle of the Piney Woods" rivalry game is held between the Stephen F. Austin Lumberjacks and the Bearkats. The Bearkats have dominated the rivalry for the past decade and own an all-time advantage in the football series 58-35–2, including 18 of the last 21 and each of the last 10. Since 2010 the rivalry game has been played at NRG Stadium in Houston, the home of the Houston Texans. The game annually draws one of the largest crowds of the season in the FCS. Sam Houston usually brings about 20,000 fans to the game in Houston.

The Bearkats shared the NAIA national title with Concordia (MN) in 1964, when they finished the national championship game in a 7–7 tie.

==== Previous coaching history ====
Willie Fritz was the head football coach (2010–2013) at Sam Houston and was the 2011 American Football Coaches Association Coach of the Year and 2012 AFCA Regional Coach of the Year.

In 2011, Fritz's second year as head coach, the Bearkats were the only FCS school to have an undefeated regular season thus earning the team the No. 1 seed in the playoffs. The 2011 Bearkats were NCAA Division I National Championship Finalists, eventually losing to the North Dakota State Bison in the FCS National Championship game. They would return to the title game the following season, only to lose to the North Dakota State Bison again. However, on May 2, 2021 the Bearkats defeated the NDSU Bison in the quarterfinals of the 2021 NCAA Division I FCS championship.
