= Central Arkansas Bears and Sugar Bears =

Collegiate sports program of the University of Central Arkansas

- University: University of Central Arkansas
- Nickname: Bears and Sugar Bears
- NCAA: Division I (FCS)
- Conference: UAC
- Athletic director: Matt Whiting
- Location: Conway, Arkansas
- Varsity teams: 18 (8 men's, 10 women's)
- Football stadium: Estes Stadium
- Basketball arena: Farris Center
- Baseball stadium: Bear Stadium
- Softball stadium: Farris Field
- Soccer stadium: Bill Stephens Track/Soccer Complex
- Other venues: Prince Center (volleyball)
- Colors: Purple and gray
- Mascot: Bruce D. Bear and Sugar Bear
- Website: ucasports.com

The Central Arkansas Bears and Sugar Bears represent the University of Central Arkansas (UCA) in NCAA Division I Atlantic Sun Conference (ASUN), The football team competes in the Division I Football Championship Subdivision (formerly I-AA football) as a member of the United Athletic Conference (UAC). The athletic program is supported by the efforts of a diverse group of over 400 male and female student-athletes. Its men's teams are called the Bears and the women's are the Sugar Bears.

UCA joined the ASUN in July 2021 after having been a member of the Southland Conference. At the time, the ASUN did not sponsor football, but had committed to launching an FCS football league in the near future. UCA played the 2021 season as a de facto associate member of the Western Athletic Conference (WAC), competing in a football partnership between the two leagues officially branded as the "ASUN–WAC Challenge". The ASUN started its football league in the 2022 season, but maintained its football partnership with the WAC. After that season, the two conferences merged their football leagues to create the UAC.

In June 2025, the ASUN and WAC announced a strategic alliance under which the Western Athletic Conference would rebrand as the United Athletic Conference beginning with the 2026–27 academic year. As part of this transition, Central Arkansas will become a full member of the rebranded all-sports UAC while continuing to compete in football within the conference’s established UAC football structure. The reorganization preserves NCAA Division I continuity and automatic qualification status for the participating institutions.

== Conference affiliations ==
NAIA

- Arkansas Intercollegiate Conference (1928–1993)

NCAA

- Gulf South Conference (1993–2006)
- Southland Conference (2006–2021)
- Atlantic Sun Conference (2021–2026)
- United Athletic Conference (2026–present)

=== NAIA ===
Prior to moving to Division II, UCA competed in NAIA Division I for most sports, winning the national football championship three times (1984 {co-champs}, 1985 {co-champs} and 1991) and finishing runner-up once (1976). Between 1979 and 1992, UCA won or shared 13 out of 14 Arkansas Intercollegiate Conference championships (AIC) and went to the playoffs 12 times in that span. A number of former Bears have found success in the NFL, including Tom McConnaughey, Jacob Ford, Landon Trusty, Willie Davis, Tyree Davis, Dave Burnette, Curtis Burrow, Andre Collins, David Evans, and most notably Monte Coleman.

=== NCAA ===
From 1993 to 2006, UCA competed in the West Division of the Gulf South Conference. In 2005–2006, UCA's men's athletic teams won that conference's All Sports Trophy. However, on July 1, 2006, UCA began the transition to Division I and joined the Southland Conference, with the Bears also becoming Associate members of the Missouri Valley Conference for men's soccer.

In 2008, the UCA Bear Football Team defeated more Southland Conference opponents than any other conference team and were declared "Unofficial Southland Conference Champions". (Neither the Southland Conference nor the NCAA would recognize UCA as the champions due to the transition period from Division II.)

== Varsity teams ==
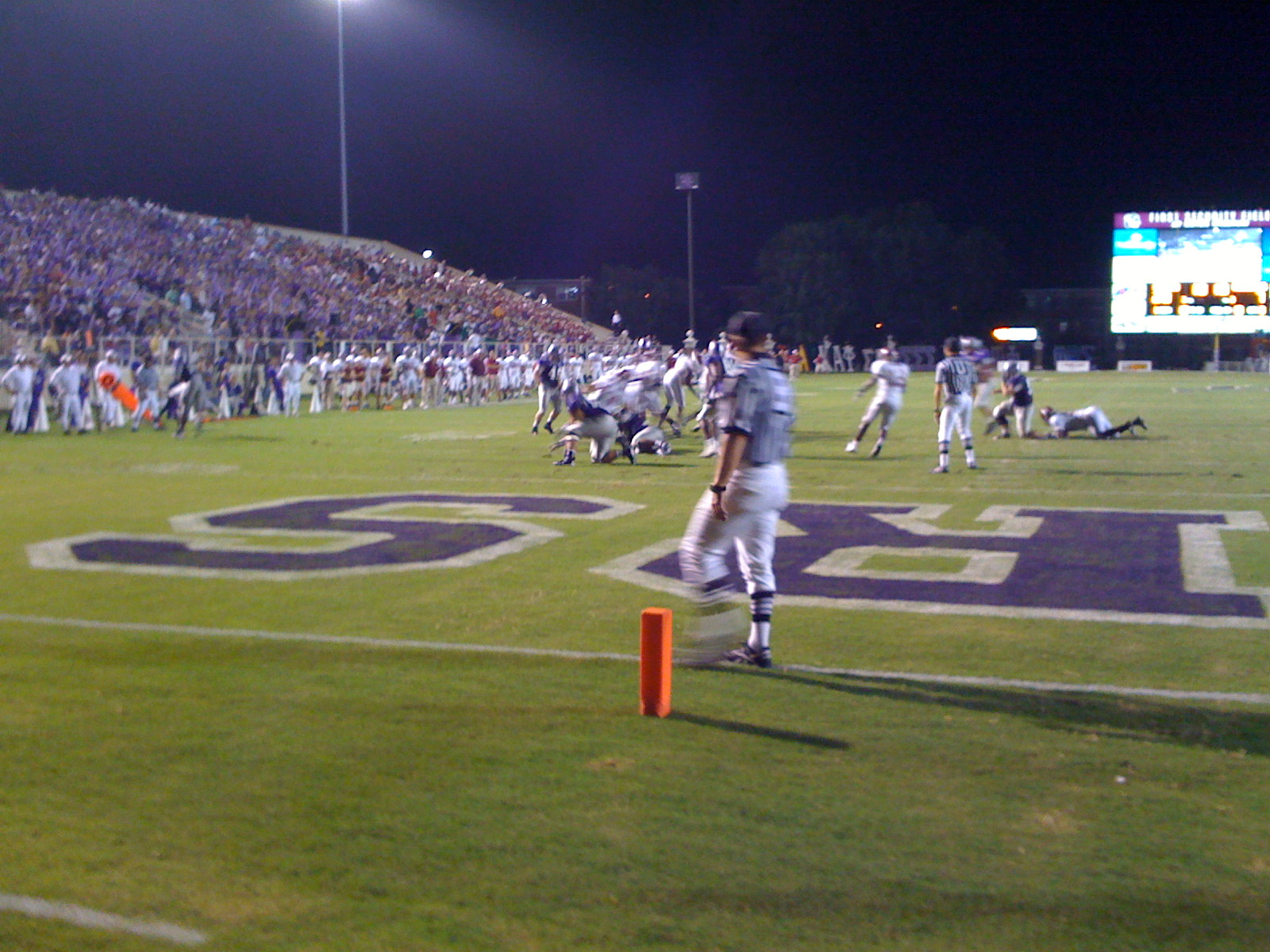
Estes Stadium west side with players in action

As of the upcoming 2025–26 school year, UCA fields 8 men's and 10 women's varsity teams. The most recent change to UCA sports sponsorship was the dropping of women's tennis after the 2024–25 season.

Men's sports	Women's sports
Baseball	Basketball
Basketball	Beach volleyball
Cross country	Cross country
Football	Golf
Golf	Soccer
Soccer	Softball
Track and field^{1}	Stunt
	Track and field^{1}
	Volleyball
^{1} – includes both indoor and outdoor

== Scottie Pippen ==
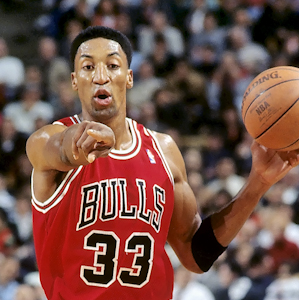
NBA Hall of Famer Scottie Pippen played college basketball for Arkansas

Former National Basketball Association player Scottie Pippen played basketball at Central Arkansas. Pippen was a 6 ft 2 in (1.88 m) walk-on his first year at UCA, but by the start of his sophomore year, he had grown to 6 ft 7 in (2.01 m) and would be a starter for the next three seasons. Pippen was drafted by the Seattle SuperSonics with the fifth pick in the 1987 NBA draft, and then traded to the Chicago Bulls for Olden Polynice. Pippen won six NBA championships (1991–1993 and 1996–1998) while playing for the Bulls (1987–1998). While still an active player, Pippen was voted as one of the NBA's Top 50 Players of All-Time, and the Chicago Bulls retired his jersey number (#33).

His #33 jersey at UCA is also retired since January 2010, and hangs in the rafters. Pippen also played for the Houston Rockets (1998–1999) and the Portland Trail Blazers (1999–2003). Pippen is retired, and lives with his family in Los Angeles; his son Scotty Jr. currently plays for the NBA's Memphis Grizzlies.
