= Southland Conference =

American collegiate athletic conference

- Formerly: Southland Football League (1996–2002, football-only)
- Association: NCAA
- Founded: 1963
- Commissioner: Chris Grant (since 2022)
- Sports fielded: 18; men's: 8; women's: 10
- Division: Division I
- Subdivision: FCS
- No. of teams: 12
- Headquarters: Frisco, Texas
- Region: West South Central
- Broadcaster: ESPN
- Website: southland.org

Locations

The Southland Conference (SLC) is a collegiate athletic conference which operates in the South Central United States (specifically Texas and Louisiana). It participates in the NCAA's Division I for all sports; for football, it participates in the Division I Football Championship Subdivision (FCS). The Southland sponsors 18 sports, 10 for women and eight for men, and is governed by a presidential Board of Directors and an Advisory Council of athletic and academic administrators. Chris Grant became the Southland's seventh commissioner on April 5, 2022. From 1996 to 2002, for football only, the Southland Conference was known as the Southland Football League.

The conference's offices are located in the Dallas suburb of Frisco, Texas. According to a press release from April 11, 2022, the conference was to undergo a rebrand in 2022 that included a new name and logo. The rebranding was unveiled in March 2023, with a new logo but no change to the conference name.

== History ==
=== Chronological timeline ===
Southland Conference
Location of Southland members: full

Founded in 1963, its members were Abilene Christian College (now Abilene Christian University; departed in 1973 for NAIA, then moved to NCAA Division II before they rejoined Division I and the Southland in 2013), Arkansas State College (now Arkansas State University; departed in 1987, now a member of the Sun Belt Conference), Arlington State College (now the University of Texas at Arlington, departed in 2012 and now in the United Athletic Conference), Lamar State College of Technology (now Lamar University; departed in 1987, rejoined in 1999, left again in 2021, returned in 2022), and Trinity University (departed in 1972, now participating in NCAA Division III).

Since its founding, the Southland Conference has been the home for 18 college and university all-sports programs (see membership timeline below). In addition, the conference has also been home to some schools for one sport only. In the case of football, Troy University fielded a team from 1996 to 2000 and Jacksonville State University did so from 1997 to 2002. This has also been the case for some Olympic sports like men's tennis, in which the University of Texas–Pan American (UTPA; since merged into the University of Texas Rio Grande Valley, or UTRGV) and the University of New Orleans (UNO; now LSU New Orleans) fielded teams as affiliate members before 2013, when UTPA joined the WAC and UNO became a full Southland member.

The Southland underwent major turmoil in 2021, losing five members. On January 14, the Western Athletic Conference (WAC) announced that four Southland members - Abilene Christian, Lamar, Sam Houston, and Stephen F. Austin - would join that conference in July 2022. Within a week, the Southland expelled those four schools, leading the WAC to move their entry up to July 2021. A fifth member, Central Arkansas, announced on January 29 that it would join the Atlantic Sun Conference effective that July. At the time, the ASUN was a non-football conference, but soon entered into a football partnership with the WAC that gave Central Arkansas and two other incoming ASUN members a football home until an ASUN football league was established.

The Southland began the process of rebuilding its core membership in September 2021, announcing that East Texas A&M University, then named Texas A&M University-Commerce, would start a transition from NCAA Division II and join the conference in July 2022. The SLC also announced a football scheduling alliance with the Ohio Valley Conference, another FCS league that had experienced major membership losses during the early-2020s realignment cycle, for the 2022 and 2023 seasons. However, shortly after Texas A&M-Commerce was announced as a future member, the SLC was set to experience further attrition when the University of the Incarnate Word (UIW) announced that it would leave for the WAC after the 2021–22 school year. Ultimately, however, this did not come to pass, as UIW announced it would be staying in the SLC only 7 months after announcing its departure. McNeese was also courted by the WAC, and also flirted with a move to Conference USA, but eventually stayed in the SLC. According to the American Press, the daily newspaper of McNeese's home of Lake Charles, Louisiana, McNeese became "the de facto lead school in the league". It was set to host the SLC's football media day through at least the 2026 season, as well as the conference tournaments in men's and women's basketball, baseball, and softball through 2026.

More recently, Lamar announced it would return to the SLC effective in 2023–24. In addition, on April 11, 2022 the conference announced in a press release that it had partnered with Troika Media Group to institute a rebrand to be implemented before the end of the calendar year. The release stated that the rebrand would include, among other things, a new name for the conference. On July 11, 2022, Lamar and the Southland Conference announced Lamar's accelerated return to the SLC effective immediately. The following day saw the SLC lose two of its women's golf associates when the Mid-Eastern Athletic Conference (MEAC) and Northeast Conference (NEC) announced a partnership for baseball and men's and women's golf that saw all MEAC schools that sponsored those sports become NEC associates. Accordingly, Delaware State and Maryland Eastern Shore, which had joined SLC women's golf just a year earlier, moved that sport to the NEC.

On March 25, 2024, the Southland expanded again with the announcement that UTRGV would join the conference effective July 1, 2024, joining Lamar from the WAC. Two months later, multiple media reports indicated that Stephen F. Austin would return to the SLC in July 2024; this move was officially announced on May 29.

== Member schools ==
=== Current full members ===
Institution	Location	Founded	Type	Enrollment	Endowment (millions)	Nickname	Joined (Note: Represents the calendar year when fall sports competition begins.)	Colors
East Texas A&M University (Note: Formerly known as Texas A&M University–Commerce prior to November 2024.)	Commerce, Texas	1889	Public (Note: Part of the Texas A&M University System.)	10,785	$33.2 (Note: This refers to the endowment under direct institutional control, and does not include any funds the school receives from the state's Permanent University Fund as part of the Texas A&M University System.)	Lions	2022	
Houston Christian University (Note: Formerly known as Houston Baptist University until 2022.)	Houston, Texas	1960	Christian	5,285	$132	Huskies	2013	
University of the Incarnate Word	San Antonio, Texas	1881	Catholic (CCVI)	9,191	$175	Cardinals	2013	
Lamar University	Beaumont, Texas	1923	Public (Note: Part of the Texas State University System.)	18,050	$162	Cardinals & Lady Cardinals	1963; 1999; 2022 (Note: Lamar left the Southland after the 1986–87 school year, rejoined in 1999–2000, then left again after 2020–21, returned since 2022–23.)	
LSU New Orleans (Note: Known as the University of New Orleans from 1974 to 2026, and part of the University of Louisiana System from 2011 to 2026.)	New Orleans, Louisiana	1958	Public (Note: Part of the Louisiana State University System.)	8,151	$25.8	Privateers	2013	
McNeese State University	Lake Charles, Louisiana	1939	Public (Note: Part of the University of Louisiana System.)	7,648	$118	Cowboys & Cowgirls	1972	
Nicholls State University	Thibodaux, Louisiana	1948	Public	6,366	$30	Colonels	1991	
Northwestern State University	Natchitoches, Louisiana	1884	Public	8,847	$20.8	Demons & Lady Demons	1987	
Southeastern Louisiana University	Hammond, Louisiana	1925	Public	14,440	$22.6	Lions & Lady Lions	1997	
Stephen F. Austin State University	Nacogdoches, Texas	1923	Public (Note: Part of the University of Texas System.)	11,178	$128.0 (Note: The referenced report was issued before SFA joined the University of Texas System. The legislation that added SFA to the UT System also gave it rights to receive funding from the state's Permanent University Fund.)	Lumberjacks & Ladyjacks	1987; 2024 (Note: Stephen F. Austin left the Southland after the 2020–21 school year, before rejoining in 2024–25.)	
Texas A&M University–Corpus Christi (TAMU–CC, A&M–CC)	Corpus Christi, Texas	1947	Public	12,174	$21.3	Islanders	2006	
University of Texas Rio Grande Valley (UTRGV)	Edinburg, Texas (Note: UTRGV has multiple campuses within its service area, but its academic and athletic administrations are at the Edinburg campus it inherited from its athletic predecessor of the University of Texas–Pan American (UTPA).)	2015 (Note: UTRGV was formally founded in 2013, but did not start instruction until 2015.)	Public	32,419	$103.7 (Note: This refers to the endowment under direct UTRGV control, and does not include any funds it receives from the Permanent University Fund as a member of the UT System.)	Vaqueros	2024 (Note: While UTRGV formally joined the Southland in 2024, the athletic program traces its history through UTPA, which was a Southland affiliate in men's tennis from 2000 until 2013. The UTRGV athletic program inherited UTPA's memberships in Division I and the Western Athletic Conference.)	

=== Former full members ===
School names and nicknames listed here reflect those in use in each institution's final school year of Southland Conference membership.

Institution	Location	Founded	Type	Nickname	Joined (Note: Represents the calendar year when fall sports competition begins.)	Left (Note: Represents the calendar year when spring sports competition ends.)	Colors	Current conference
Abilene Christian University	Abilene, Texas	1906	Church of Christ	Wildcats	1963	1973		United
Abilene Christian University	Abilene, Texas	1906	Church of Christ	Wildcats	2013	2021		United
Arkansas State University	Jonesboro, Arkansas	1909	Public	Indians (Note: Arkansas State changed its nickname to Red Wolves after leaving the Southland Conference.)	1963	1987		Sun Belt (SBC)
University of Central Arkansas	Conway, Arkansas	1907	Public	Bears & Sugar Bears	2006	2021		United
Louisiana Tech University (LaTech)	Ruston, Louisiana	1894	Public	Bulldogs & Lady Techsters	1971	1987		Sun Belt (SBC)
University of Louisiana at Monroe (ULM)	Monroe, Louisiana	1931	Public	Indians (Note: Louisiana–Monroe changed its nickname to Warhawks after leaving the Southland Conference.)	1982	2006		Sun Belt (SBC)
University of North Texas	Denton, Texas	1890	Public	Mean Green	1982	1996		American
Oral Roberts University	Tulsa, Oklahoma	1963	Evangelical	Golden Eagles	2012	2014		Summit
University of Southwestern Louisiana (Note: Southwestern Louisiana (now Louisiana–Lafayette) competed as an associate member of the Southland for its women's sports from 1982–83 to 1986–87.) (Note: Currently known as the University of Louisiana at Lafayette since 1998, and branded athletically as Louisiana since 2017.)	Lafayette, Louisiana	1898	Public	Ragin' Cajuns	1971	1982		Sun Belt (SBC)
Sam Houston State University	Huntsville, Texas	1879	Public	Bearkats	1987	2021		Conf. USA (CUSA)
Texas State University (Note: Texas State dropped its city of San Marcos from its institutional name in 2013, a year after leaving the Southland Conference.)	San Marcos, Texas	1899	Public	Bobcats	1987	2012		Pac-12
University of Texas at Arlington	Arlington, Texas	1895	Public	Mavericks	1963	2012		United
University of Texas at San Antonio	San Antonio, Texas	1969	Public	Roadrunners	1991	2012		American
Trinity University	San Antonio, Texas	1869	Nonsectarian	Tigers	1963	1972		Southern (SAA) (Note: Current NCAA Division III athletic conference.)

=== Former associate members ===
Institution	Location	Founded	Type	Nickname	Joined (Note: Represents the calendar year when fall sports competition begins.)	Left (Note: Represents the calendar year when spring sports competition ends.)	SLC sport(s)	Current primary conference	Current conference in former SLC sport(s)
Augusta University	Augusta, Georgia	1828	Public	Jaguars	2021	2025	Men's golf	Peach Belt (PBC) (Note: Currently an NCAA Division II athletic conference.)	West Coast (WCC)
Augusta University	Augusta, Georgia	1828	Public	Jaguars	2021	2025	Women's golf	Peach Belt (PBC)	West Coast (WCC)
Boise State University	Boise, Idaho	1932	Public	Broncos	2022	2025	Beach volleyball	Pac-12	Big 12
Bryant University	Smithfield, Rhode Island	1863	Nonsectarian	Bulldogs	2022	2024	Men's golf	America East (AmEast)	Ohio Valley (OVC)
Bryant University	Smithfield, Rhode Island	1863	Nonsectarian	Bulldogs	2022	2024	Women's golf	America East (AmEast)	Ohio Valley (OVC)
Bryant University	Smithfield, Rhode Island	1863	Nonsectarian	Bulldogs	2022	2024	Women's tennis	America East (AmEast)	Ohio Valley (OVC)
Bryant University	Smithfield, Rhode Island	1863	Nonsectarian	Bulldogs	2022	2025	Men's tennis	America East (AmEast)	Big South (BSC)
Centenary College of Louisiana (Note: Centenary no longer sponsors men's tennis.)	Shreveport, Louisiana	1825	United; Methodist	Gentlemen	2000	2003	Men's tennis	Southern (SCAC) (Note: Currently an NCAA Division III athletic conference.)	N/A
Delaware State University	Dover, Delaware	1891	Public (Note: Delaware State is officially chartered as a "privately-governed, state-assisted" institution. This status is broadly similar to that of New York State's statutory colleges, most of which are housed at Cornell University, or institutions in Pennsylvania's Commonwealth System of Higher Education.) (Note: Also a historically black college and university.)	Hornets	2021	2022	Women's golf	Mid-Eastern (MEAC)	
Francis Marion University	Florence, South Carolina	1970	Public	Patriots	2021	2025	Men's golf	Carolinas (CC)	Big Sky (BSC)
Jacksonville State University	Jacksonville, Alabama	1883	Public	Gamecocks	1997	2003	Football	Conf. USA (CUSA)	
University of Illinois Chicago (UIC)	Chicago, Illinois	1859	Public	Flames	2022	2023	Men's tennis	Missouri Valley (MVC)	Mid-American (MAC)
University of Southwestern Louisiana (Note: Currently known as the University of Louisiana at Lafayette since 1998, and branded athletically as Louisiana since 2017.)	Lafayette, Louisiana	1898	Public	Ragin' Cajuns	1982	1987	Women's sports (Note: Southwestern Louisiana (now Louisiana–Lafayette) competed as a full member of the Southland for its men's sports from 1971–72 to 1981–82.)	Sun Belt (SBC)	
LSU New Orleans (Note: Known as the University of New Orleans from 1974–2026.)	New Orleans, Louisiana	1958	Public	Privateers	2012	2013	Men's tennis	Southland (SLC)	
University of Maryland Eastern Shore (UMES)	Princess Anne, Maryland	1886	Public	Hawks	2021	2022	Women's golf	Mid-Eastern (MEAC)	
New Jersey Institute of Technology (NJIT)	Newark, New Jersey	1881	Public	Highlanders	2021	2025	Men's tennis	America East (AmEast)	Big South (BSC)
New Jersey Institute of Technology (NJIT)	Newark, New Jersey	1881	Public	Highlanders	2021	2025	Women's tennis	America East (AmEast)	Big South (BSC)
San Jose State University	San Jose, California	1857	Public	Spartans	2022	2025	Beach volleyball	Mountain West (MW)	Mountain Pacific (MPSF)
Texas A&M University–Corpus Christi (TAMU–CC, A&M–CC)	Corpus Christi, Texas	1947	Public	Islanders	2003	2006	Men's tennis	Southland (SLC)	
University of Texas-Pan American (Note: Texas–Pan American (UTPA) ceased to exist at the start of the 2015–16 school year, when it merged with the nearby University of Texas at Brownsville (UTB) to create the new University of Texas Rio Grande Valley (UTRGV), which becomes a full SLC member in July 2024.) (UTPA)	Edinburg, Texas (Note: The UTRGV athletic program continues to be based at the former UTPA main campus in Edinburg.)	1927	Public	Broncs (Note: Nearly a year before the merger, the University of Texas System announced that UTRGV would directly inherit the UTPA athletic program. The new nickname of Vaqueros was announced in November 2014. The UTRGV athletic program thus claims all of UTPA's athletic history and records.)	2000	2013	Men's tennis	Southland (SLC)	
Troy State University (Note: Known as Troy University since 2005.)	Troy, Alabama	1887	Public	Trojans	1996	2001	Football	Sun Belt (SBC)	

=== Membership timeline ===
Full member (all sports) Full member (non-football) Associate member (football) Associate member (sport) Other Conference Other Conference

1. - Southwestern Louisiana became the University of Louisiana at Lafayette (Louisiana–Lafayette, now athletically branded as simply Louisiana) in 1999.
2. - Northeast Louisiana became the University of Louisiana at Monroe (Louisiana–Monroe) in 1999.
3. - UTPA merged with the University of Texas at Brownsville to become the University of Texas Rio Grande Valley (UTRGV) in 2015.

== Sports ==
The Southland Conference sponsors championship competition in eight men's and 10 women's NCAA sanctioned sports. The most recently added sport is beach volleyball, with SLC competition starting in 2019–20.

Teams in Southland Conference competition
Sport	Men's	Women's
Baseball	11	–
Basketball	12	10
Beach Volleyball	–	7
Cross Country	12	12
Football	10	–
Golf	10	8
Soccer	–	11
Softball	–	10
Tennis	8	12
Track and Field (Indoor)	11	12
Track and Field (Outdoor)	11	12
Volleyball (Indoor)	–	12

=== Men's sponsored sports by school ===
School	Baseball	Basketball	Cross Country	Football	Golf	Tennis	Track & Field (Indoor)	Track & Field (Outdoor)	Total Southland Sports
East Texas A&M	No	Yes	Yes	Yes	Yes	No	Yes	Yes	6
Houston Christian	Yes	Yes	Yes	Yes	Yes	No	Yes	Yes	7
Incarnate Word	Yes	Yes	Yes	Yes	Yes	Yes	Yes	Yes	8
Lamar	Yes	Yes	Yes	Yes	Yes	Yes	Yes	Yes	8
LSU New Orleans	Yes	Yes	Yes	No	Yes	Yes	Yes	Yes	7
McNeese	Yes	Yes	Yes	Yes	Yes	No	Yes	Yes	7
Nicholls	Yes	Yes	Yes	Yes	Yes	Yes	Yes	Yes	6
Northwestern State	Yes	Yes	Yes	Yes	No	No	Yes	Yes	6
Southeastern Louisiana	Yes	Yes	Yes	Yes	Yes	No	Yes	Yes	7
Stephen F. Austin	Yes	Yes	Yes	Yes	Yes	No	Yes	Yes	7
Texas A&M-Corpus Christi	Yes	Yes	Yes	No	No	Yes	Yes	Yes	6
UTRGV	Yes	Yes	Yes	Yes	Yes	Yes	Yes	Yes	8
Totals	11	12	12	10	10	6	11	11	83

Men's varsity sports not sponsored by the Southland Conference which are played by SLC schools:

School	Soccer	Swimming & Diving	Fencing
Houston Christian	OVC	No	No
Incarnate Word	OVC	MPSF	MPSF
UTRGV	OVC	No	No

=== Women's sponsored sports by school ===
School	Basketball	Beach Volleyball	Cross Country	Golf	Soccer	Softball	Tennis	Track & Field (Indoor)	Track & Field (Outdoor)	Volleyball	Total Southland Sports
East Texas A&M	Yes	No	Yes	Yes	Yes	Yes	No	Yes	Yes	Yes	8
Houston Christian	Yes	Yes	Yes	Yes	Yes	Yes	No	Yes	Yes	Yes	9
Incarnate Word	Yes	No	Yes	Yes	Yes	Yes	Yes	Yes	Yes	Yes	9
Lamar	Yes	No	Yes	Yes	Yes	Yes	Yes	Yes	Yes	Yes	9
LSU New Orleans	Yes	Yes	Yes	No	No	No	Yes	Yes	Yes	Yes	7
McNeese	Yes	Yes	Yes	Yes	Yes	Yes	Yes	Yes	Yes	Yes	10
Nicholls	Yes	Yes	Yes	No	Yes	Yes	Yes	Yes	Yes	Yes	9
Northwestern State	Yes	No	Yes	No	Yes	Yes	Yes	Yes	Yes	Yes	8
Southeastern Louisiana	Yes	Yes	Yes	No	Yes	Yes	Yes	Yes	Yes	Yes	9
Stephen F. Austin	Yes	Yes	Yes	Yes	Yes	Yes	Yes	Yes	Yes	Yes	10
Texas A&M–Corpus Christi	Yes	Yes	Yes	Yes	Yes	Yes	Yes	Yes	Yes	Yes	10
UTRGV	Yes	No	Yes	Yes	Yes	No	Yes	Yes	Yes	Yes	8
Totals	12	7	12	8	11	10	8	12	12	12	104

Women's varsity sports not sponsored by the Southland Conference which are played by SLC schools:

School	Swimming & Diving	Fencing
Incarnate Word	MPSF	MPSF
UTRGV	MPSF (Note: Joining the Big Sky in 2027.)	No

== Football ==
Former and current players from the Southland that would go on to star in the National Football League include Gary Barbaro, Mike Barber, Fred Barnett, Bill Bergey, Derrick Blaylock, Bubby Brister, Ray Brown, Roger Carr, Mark Carrier, Larry Centers, Bruce Collie, Keith Davis, Fred Dean, Jackie Harris, Stan Humphries, Buford Jordan, Wade Key, Josh McCown, Tim McKyer, Jeff Novak, Kavika Pittman, Mike Quinn, Billy Ryckman, Ricky Sanders, Eugene Seale, Rafael Septién, Terrance Shaw, Marcus Spears, Chad Stanley, Pat Tilley, Jeremiah Trotter, Marvin Upshaw, Lardarius Webb and Spergon Wynn. The Southland was instrumental in founding the Independence Bowl, and the Southland champion served as the automatic home team for that bowl from 1976–1980. On May 21, 2014, the Southland Conference approved the use of instant replay at all its home games becoming the first FCS league to fully commit to having all games utilize instant replay.

== Men's basketball ==
Among notable NBA stars attending Southland Conference schools include Karl Malone (Louisiana Tech), Joe Dumars (McNeese), Jeff Foster (Southwest Texas State, now known as Texas State), and Andrew Toney (Southwestern Louisiana, now known as Louisiana).

== Women's basketball ==
Former member Louisiana–Monroe (then Northeast Louisiana) advanced to the 1985 NCAA Women's Final Four.

== Championships ==
- Southland Conference men's basketball tournament
- Southland Conference women's basketball tournament
- Southland Conference baseball tournament
- Southland Conference women's soccer tournament
- Southland Conference softball tournament

== Spending and revenue ==
Total revenue includes ticket sales, contributions and donations, rights/licensing, student fees, school funds and all other sources including TV income, camp income, food and novelties. Total expenses includes coaching/staff, scholarships, buildings/ground, maintenance, utilities and rental fees and all other costs including recruiting, team travel, equipment and uniforms, conference dues and insurance costs.

Conference Rank (2023–24)	Institution	2023-24 Total Revenue from Athletics	2023-24 Total Expenses on Athletics
1	Incarnate Word	$24,959,864	$24,959,864
2	Stephen F. Austin	$23,836,563	$23,836,563
3	Lamar	$23,698,410	$23,698,410
4	Houston Christian	$20,045,332	$20,045,332
5	UTRGV	$20,007,469	$20,007,469
6	East Texas A&M	$18,000,481	$17,433,995
7	Southeastern Louisiana	$17,404,468	$17,404,468
8	McNeese	$16,868,726	$16,868,726
9	Texas A&M Corpus Christi	$15,904,566	$15,904,566
10	Northwestern State	$15,228,540	$12,032,739
11	Nicholls	$13,331,867	$12,953,173
12	New Orleans	$7,856,085	$7,856,085

Notes
Note 1 - Data from U.S. Department of Education Equity in Athletics Data Analysis Cutting Tool Database. OPE Equity in Athletics Data Analysis Cutting Tool used in order to provide ranking for private institutions in the conference.
Note 2 - Current non-football programs. Note: UTRGV joined the SLC as a non-football member for the 2024–25 school year, and New Orleans changed its name to LSU New Orleans in July 2026.
Note 3 - Joined SLC effective July 1, 2024.
Note 3 - Reporting period is from midyear 2023 to midyear 2024.

== Facilities ==
School	Football stadium	Capacity	Soccer stadium	Capacity	Basketball arena	Capacity	Baseball stadium	Capacity	Softball stadium	Capacity
East Texas A&M	Ernest Hawkins Field at Memorial Stadium	11,582	Lion Soccer Field	500	The Field House	3,055	Non-baseball school		John Cain Family Softball Complex	800
Houston Christian	Husky Stadium	5,000	Sorrels Field	500	Sharp Gymnasium	1,000	Husky Field	500	Husky Field	300
Incarnate Word	Gayle and Tom Benson Stadium	6,000	Gayle and Tom Benson Stadium	6,000	McDermott Convocation Center	2,000	Sullivan Field	1,000	H-E-B Field	250
Lamar	Provost Umphrey Stadium	16,000	Lamar Soccer Complex	500	Montagne Center	10,080	Vincent-Beck Stadium	3,500	Lamar Softball Complex	500
LSU New Orleans	Non-football school		Non-soccer school		Lakefront Arena	8,933	Maestri Field at Privateer Park	2,900	Non-softball school	
McNeese	Cowboy Stadium	17,610	Cowgirl Field	300	Townsley Law Arena	4,242	Joe Miller Ballpark	2,000	Joe Miller Field at Cowgirl Diamond	1,200
Nicholls	Manning Field at John L. Guidry Stadium	10,500	Thibodaux Regional Sports Complex	1,000	Stopher Gymnasium	3,800	Ben Meyer Diamond at Ray E. Didier Field	2,100	Swanner Field at Geo Surfaces Park	500
Northwestern State	Harry Turpin Stadium	15,971	Lady Demon Soccer Complex	1,000	Prather Coliseum	3,900	H. Alvin Brown-C. C. Stroud Field	1,200	Lady Demon Diamond	1,000
Southeastern Louisiana	Strawberry Stadium	7,408	Southeastern Soccer Complex	1,000	University Center	7,500	Pat Kenelly Diamond at Alumni Field	2,500	North Oak Park	500
Stephen F. Austin	Homer Bryce Stadium	14,575	SFA Soccer Field	400	William R. Johnson Coliseum	7,203	Jaycees Field	1,000	SFA Softball Field	750
Texas A&M-Corpus Christi	Non-football school		Dr. Jack Dugan Soccer & Track Stadium	1,000	American Bank Center (Note: Texas A&M-Corpus Christi also schedules some home basketball games at the Dugan Wellness Center (capacity 1,200).)	9,385	Chapman Field (Note: Texas A&M-Corpus Christi uses off-campus Whataburger Field as their home field for some high-profile games and some tournaments.)	750	Chapman Field	200
UTRGV	Robert and Janet Vackar Stadium (Note: UTRGV also plans to play one home game a year at Sams Memorial Stadium in Brownsville (Capacity 10,300).)	13,500 (Note: Capacity for UTRGV's first season of varsity football in 2025.)	UTRGV Soccer and Track & Field Complex	1,555	UTRGV Fieldhouse (Note: UTRGV also schedules home basketball games at Bert Ogden Arena (capacity 7,700).)	2,500	UTRGV Baseball Stadium	5,000	Non-softball school	

== Media ==
=== Southland Conference Television Network ===
The Conference began its own syndicated broadcast entity in 2008, the Southland Conference Television Network. It aired in over 25 markets in the league's four-state region, plus on national networks such as Fox College Sports, ESPN GamePlan, and ESPN3. In 2008-09, the network featured 35 broadcasts, and over 30 in each of the next four seasons.

For 2013 and 2014, the syndicated network was restricted to only regular season football games. The remainder of the schedule was available on ESPN3 or regional sports networks, including regular season and tournament basketball as well as championships in soccer, volleyball, softball and baseball. ESPN3 also carried an exclusive package of football games beyond the syndicated network's schedule.

SLCTV dissolved on July 1, 2015. Beginning with the 2015–16 school year, the Southland Conference entered into an agreement with the American Sports Network to syndicate and televise selected games, while also continuing its association with ESPN3. A separate deal allowed Louisiana-based Cox Sports Television to air select games.

After ASN folded following the 2016–17 academic year, the Southland announced a television agreement with Eleven Sports. During 2017-18, conference-controlled games aired on ESPN3, Eleven Sports, Fox Sports Southwest and Cox Sports Television. For 2018-19, ESPN productions began to be split between ESPN3 and ESPN+ platforms. On October 8, 2020, the Southland Conference announced a multi-year extension through the 2024–25 academic year as well as an expansion of its media rights agreement with ESPN.

== Academics ==
Institution	University System	Endowment (Note: For institutions that are part of a larger university system, this refers to the endowment under direct institutional control. It does not include funds received from system-wide endowments, such as the Permanent University Fund for institutions in the University of Texas and Texas A&M University Systems.)	U.S. News rank	Carnegie Foundation Classification
East Texas A&M University	Texas A&M University System	$34,200,000	377 (National)	Doctoral (R2:High research)
Houston Christian University	Not Applicable	$131,000,000	70 (Regional: West)	Masters (Larger Programs)
University of the Incarnate Word	Not Applicable	$143,800,000	288 (National)	Doctoral (Professional Universities)
Lamar University	Texas State University System	$131,000,000	392-434 (National)	Doctoral (R2:High research)
LSU New Orleans (Note: Known from 1974 to June 2026 as the University of New Orleans.)	Louisiana State University System (Note: Member of the University of Louisiana System from 2011 to 2026.)	$22,100,000	392-434 (National)	Doctoral (R2:High Research)
McNeese State University	University of Louisiana System	$118,000,000	78 (Regional: South)	Masters (Larger Programs)
Nicholls State University	University of Louisiana System	$8,190,000	72 (Regional: South)	Masters (Medium Programs)
Northwestern State University	University of Louisiana System	$16,400,000	57; Regional: South)	Masters (Larger Programs)
Southeastern Louisiana University	University of Louisiana System	$20,000,000	82 (Regional: South)	Masters (Larger Programs)
Stephen F. Austin State University	University of Texas System	$111,000,000	35 (Regional: West)	Masters (Larger Programs)
Texas A&M University-Corpus Christi	Texas A&M University System	$21,300,000	392-434 (National)	Doctoral (R2:High research)
University of Texas Rio Grande Valley	University of Texas System	$129,000,000	220 (National)	Doctoral (R2:High research)
