= Stephen F. Austin Lumberjacks and Ladyjacks =

Sports program representing Stephen F. Austin State University

- University: Stephen F. Austin State University
- Nickname: Lumberjacks
- NCAA: Division I (FCS)
- Conference: Southland; CUSA (women's bowling)
- Athletic director: Michael McBroom
- Location: Nacogdoches, Texas
- Varsity teams: 15
- Football stadium: Homer Bryce Stadium
- Basketball arena: William R. Johnson Coliseum
- Baseball stadium: Jaycees Field
- Softball stadium: SFA Softball Field
- Soccer stadium: SFA Soccer Field
- Other venues: Schlief Tennis Complex; Shelton Gym
- Colors: Purple and white
- Website: sfajacks.com

The Stephen F. Austin Lumberjacks and Ladyjacks are composed of 15 teams representing Stephen F. Austin State University (SFA) in intercollegiate athletics. Stephen F. Austin teams participate in Division I as a member of the Southland Conference (SLC), having rejoined that conference on July 1, 2024 after three years in the Western Athletic Conference (WAC). The football team competes in the NCAA Division I Football Championship Subdivision (FCS, formerly known as Division I-AA) for football in the SLC.

On July 1, 2021, SFA was one of five institutions announced as future members of the WAC, alongside three other Southland members from Texas (Abilene Christian, Lamar, Sam Houston) plus Big Sky Conference member Southern Utah. Initially, all five schools were to join in July 2022, but the entry of SFA and the other Texas schools was moved to 2021 after the Southland expelled its departing members. Because the WAC does not sponsor beach volleyball, SFA joined the Atlantic Sun Conference (then officially known as the ASUN Conference) for that sport. After the 2022 season, SFA moved beach volleyball to the Sun Belt Conference.

SFA football played the 2021 and 2022 seasons in a football-only alliance between the WAC and the ASUN. After the 2022 season, the WAC and ASUN fully merged their football leagues under the new identity of United Athletic Conference.

On July 1, 2024, SFA officially rejoined the SLC for all sports except women's bowling, which remained in Conference USA.

SFA announced on May 22, 2025 that it would drop four sports effective at the end of the 2024–25 school year—women's beach volleyball, bowling, and men's and women's golf.

SFA's decision to remove 3 women's sports was challenged by female athletes at the university as a title IX violation. Initial ruling indicated SFA is non-compliant with title IX, and was required to reinstate the dismantled women's programs.

== Sports sponsored ==
Men's sports	Women's sports
Baseball	Basketball
Basketball	Beach Volleyball
Cross country	Bowling
Football	Cross Country
Track and field^{†}	Golf
	Soccer
	Softball
	Tennis
	Track and field^{†}
	Volleyball
† – Track and field includes both indoor and outdoor

=== Bowling ===
The Stephen F. Austin Ladyjacks bowling team won the 2016 NCAA National Championship, going to a deciding seventh game in defeating defending national champion Nebraska. The Ladyjacks added their second national title in five seasons at the 2019 NCAA Bowling Championship, defeating Vanderbilt by a 4–1 score.

SFA was a member of the single-sport Southland Bowling League from that conference's formation in 2015 until its merger into Conference USA after the 2022–23 season. SFA announced Bowling was to be discontinued after the 2024–25 season. This decision was challenged by SFA athletes, and it has been initially ruled by court that SFA violated title IX and is required to reinstate the discontinued programs immediately.

=== Softball ===
The Ladyjacks softball team has appeared in four Women's College World Series in 1978, 1983, 1985,1986. All of these world series were at the NCAA Division II level.

== National Championships ==
Team (3)

- Softball: 1986 (DII)
- Bowling: 2016
- Bowling: 2019

Individual (5)

- Steve Riza (Men's Tennis - Singles): 1984
- Tom Goles & Chris Langford (Men's Tennis - Doubles): 1985
- Neil Smith (Men's Tennis - Singles): 1986
- Demi Payne (Women's Pole Vault): 2015
- Branson Ellis (Men's Pole Vault): 2021
