= List of NCAA Division I baseball programs =

The following is a list of schools that participate in NCAA Division I baseball. In the 2026 season, 304 Division I schools competed. These teams compete to go to the 64-team Division I baseball tournament and then to Omaha, Nebraska, and Charles Schwab Field, for the eight-team Men's College World Series (MCWS).

Conference affiliations are current for the upcoming 2027 NCAA baseball season. Years of conference changes, indicated in footnotes, reflect baseball seasons, which take place in the calendar year after a conference change takes effect. Numbers of appearances in the NCAA Tournament and MCWS are current through the 2026 season, and MCWS titles are also current through the same college baseball season.

== Division I programs ==
School (Branded as or widely known as)	Nickname	State	Home field	Conference	NCAA bids	Men's College World Series appearances	National titles
University at Albany, The State University of New York (Albany)	Great Danes	New York	Varsity Field	America East	1		
Binghamton University	Bearcats	New York	Varsity Field	America East	6		
Bryant University	Bulldogs	Rhode Island	Conaty Park	America East	3		
University of Maine	Black Bears	Maine	Larry Mahaney Diamond	America East	16	1964, 1976, 1981, 1982, 1983, 1984, 1986	
New Jersey Institute of Technology (NJIT)	Highlanders	New Jersey	Yogi Berra Stadium	America East	1		
University of Massachusetts Lowell (UMass Lowell)	River Hawks	Massachusetts	Edward A. LeLacheur Park	America East			
University of Maryland, Baltimore County (UMBC)	Retrievers	Maryland	Alumni Field	America East	3		
University of North Carolina at Charlotte (Charlotte)	49ers	North Carolina	Robert and Mariam; Hayes Stadium	American	6		
East Carolina University	Pirates	North Carolina	Clark–LeClair Stadium	American	33		(NAIA 1961)
Florida Atlantic University (FAU)	Owls	Florida	FAU Baseball Stadium	American	12		
University of Memphis	Tigers	Tennessee	FedExPark	American	5		
Rice University	Owls	Texas	Reckling Park	American	23	1997, 1999, 2002, 2003, 2006, 2007, 2008	2003
University of South Florida (USF)	Bulls	Florida	USF Baseball Stadium	American	14		
Tulane University	Green Wave	Louisiana	Greer Field at Turchin Stadium	American	21	2001, 2005	
University of Alabama at Birmingham (UAB)	Blazers	Alabama	Jerry D. Young Memorial Field	American	2		
University of Texas at San Antonio (UTSA)	Roadrunners	Texas	Roadrunner Field	American	4		
Wichita State University	Shockers	Kansas	Eck Stadium	American	28	1982, 1988, 1989, 1991, 1992, 1993, 1996	1989
Boston College	Eagles	Massachusetts	Eddie Pellagrini Diamond	Atlantic Coast	8	1953, 1960, 1961, 1967	
University of California, Berkeley (California/Cal)	Golden Bears	California	Evans Diamond	Atlantic Coast	14	1947, 1957, 1980, 1988, 1992, 2011	1947, 1957
Clemson University	Tigers	South Carolina	Doug Kingsmore Stadium	Atlantic Coast	45	1958, 1959, 1976, 1977, 1980, 1991, 1995, 1996, 2000, 2002, 2006, 2010	
Duke University	Blue Devils	North Carolina	Jack Coombs Field, Durham Athletic Park	Atlantic Coast	10	1952, 1953, 1961	
Florida State University	Seminoles	Florida	Mike Martin Field at Dick Howser Stadium	Atlantic Coast	60	1957, 1962, 1963, 1965, 1970, 1975, 1980, 1986, 1987, 1989, 1991, 1992, 1994, 1995, 1996, 1998, 1999, 2000, 2008, 2010, 2012, 2017, 2019, 2024	
Georgia Institute of Technology (Georgia Tech)	Yellow Jackets	Georgia	Russ Chandler Stadium	Atlantic Coast	35	1994, 2002, 2006	
University of Louisville	Cardinals	Kentucky	Jim Patterson Stadium	Atlantic Coast	15	2007, 2013, 2014, 2017, 2019, 2025	
University of Miami	Hurricanes	Florida	Alex Rodriguez Park at Mark Light Field	Atlantic Coast	49	1974, 1978, 1979, 1980, 1981, 1982, 1984, 1985, 1986, 1988, 1989, 1992, 1994, 1995, 1996, 1997, 1998, 1999, 2001, 2003, 2004, 2006, 2008, 2015, 2016	1982, 1985, 1999, 2001
University of North Carolina at Chapel Hill (North Carolina/Carolina)	Tar Heels	North Carolina	Boshamer Stadium	Atlantic Coast	35	1960, 1966, 1978, 1989, 2006, 2007, 2008, 2009, 2011, 2013, 2024	
North Carolina State University (NC State)	Wolfpack	North Carolina	Doak Field	Atlantic Coast	33	1968, 2013, 2024	
University of Notre Dame	Fighting Irish	Indiana	Frank Eck Stadium	Atlantic Coast	24	1957, 2002, 2022	
University of Pittsburgh (Pitt)	Panthers	Pennsylvania	Petersen Sports Complex	Atlantic Coast	3		
Stanford University	Cardinal	California	Sunken Diamond	Atlantic Coast	36	1953, 1967, 1982, 1983, 1985, 1987, 1988, 1990, 1995, 1997, 1999, 2000, 2001, 2002, 2003, 2008, 2021, 2022	1987, 1988
University of Virginia	Cavaliers	Virginia	Davenport Field	Atlantic Coast	19	2009, 2011, 2014, 2015, 2021, 2024	2015
Virginia Polytechnic Institute and State University (Virginia Tech)	Hokies	Virginia	English Field	Atlantic Coast	11		
Wake Forest University	Demon Deacons	North Carolina	Gene Hooks Field at Wake Forest Baseball Park	Atlantic Coast	16	1949, 1955	1955
Bellarmine University	Knights	Kentucky	Knights Baseball Field	ASUN			
Florida Gulf Coast University (FGCU)	Eagles	Florida	Swanson Stadium	ASUN	1		
Jacksonville University	Dolphins	Florida	John Sessions Stadium	ASUN	15		
Lipscomb University	Bisons	Tennessee	Ken Dugan Field at Stephen Lee Marsh Stadium	ASUN	2		(NAIA 1977, 1979)
University of North Florida	Ospreys	Florida	Harmon Stadium	ASUN			
Queens University of Charlotte	Royals	North Carolina	Tuckaseegee Dream Fields	ASUN			
Stetson University	Hatters	Florida	Melching Field at Conrad Park	ASUN	19		
Davidson College	Wildcats	North Carolina	T. Henry Wilson, Jr. Field	Atlantic 10	1		
University of Dayton	Flyers	Ohio	Woerner Field	Atlantic 10	1		
Fordham University	Rams	New York	Jim Houlihan Park at Jack Coffey Field	Atlantic 10	6		
George Mason University	Patriots	Virginia	Spuhler Field	Atlantic 10	7		
George Washington University	Revolutionaries	Washington, D.C.	Barcroft Park	Atlantic 10	7		
La Salle University (Note: La Salle had previously played baseball from 1947 through 2021.)	Explorers	Pennsylvania	Hank DeVincent Field	Atlantic 10	2		
University of Rhode Island	Rams	Rhode Island	Bill Beck Field	Atlantic 10	3		
University of Richmond	Spiders	Virginia	Malcolm U. Pitt Field	Atlantic 10	8		
St. Bonaventure University	Bonnies	New York	Fred Handler Park	Atlantic 10	1		
Saint Joseph's University	Hawks	Pennsylvania	Smithson Field	Atlantic 10	2		
Saint Louis University	Billikens	Missouri	Billiken Sports Center	Atlantic 10	8	1965	
Virginia Commonwealth University (VCU)	Rams	Virginia	The Diamond	Atlantic 10	13		
Butler University	Bulldogs	Indiana	Bulldog Park	Big East	1		
Creighton University	Bluejays	Nebraska	Creighton Sports Complex, Charles Schwab Field	Big East	12	1991	
Georgetown University	Hoyas	Washington, D.C.	Shirley Povich Field	Big East			
St. John's University	Red Storm	New York	Jack Kaiser Stadium	Big East	37	1949, 1960, 1966, 1968, 1978, 1980	
Seton Hall University	Pirates	New Jersey	Owen T. Carroll Field	Big East	16	1964, 1971, 1974, 1975	
University of Connecticut (UConn)	Huskies	Connecticut	Elliot Ballpark	Big East	23	1957, 1959, 1965, 1972, 1979	
Villanova University	Wildcats	Pennsylvania	Villanova Ballpark at Plymouth	Big East	2		
Xavier University	Musketeers	Ohio	J. Page Hayden Field	Big East	4		
Charleston Southern University	Buccaneers	South Carolina	Buccaneer Ballpark	Big South	1		
Gardner–Webb University	Bulldogs (Diamond ‘Dogs)	North Carolina	John Henry Moss Stadium	Big South			
High Point University	Panthers	North Carolina	George S. Erath Field at Coy O. Williard Baseball Stadium	Big South			
Longwood University	Lancers	Virginia	Bolding Stadium	Big South			
Presbyterian College	Blue Hose	South Carolina	Presbyterian College; Baseball Complex	Big South	1		
Radford University	Highlanders	Virginia	Radford University; Baseball Stadium	Big South	2		
University of North Carolina at Asheville (UNC Asheville)	Bulldogs	North Carolina	Greenwood Baseball Field, McCormick Field	Big South	1		
University of South Carolina Upstate (USC Upstate)	Spartans	South Carolina	Cleveland S. Harley; Baseball Park	Big South	1		
Winthrop University	Eagles	South Carolina	Winthrop Ballpark	Big South	5		
University of Illinois Urbana–Champaign (Illinois)	Fighting Illini	Illinois	Illinois Field	Big Ten	12		
Indiana University Bloomington (Indiana)	Hoosiers	Indiana	Bart Kaufman Field	Big Ten	8	2013	
University of Iowa	Hawkeyes	Iowa	Duane Banks Field	Big Ten	5	1972	
University of Maryland, College Park (Maryland)	Terrapins	Maryland	Shipley Field	Big Ten	8		
University of Michigan	Wolverines	Michigan	Ray Fisher Stadium	Big Ten	26	1953, 1962, 1978, 1980, 1981, 1983, 1984, 2019	1953, 1962
Michigan State University	Spartans	Michigan	Drayton McLane; Baseball Stadium at John H. Kobs Field, Cooley Law School Stadium	Big Ten	5	1954	
University of Minnesota	Golden Gophers	Minnesota	Siebert Field, U.S. Bank Stadium	Big Ten	32	1956, 1960, 1964, 1973, 1977	1956, 1960, 1964
University of Nebraska–Lincoln (Nebraska)	Cornhuskers	Nebraska	Haymarket Park	Big Ten	20	2001, 2002, 2005	
Northwestern University	Wildcats	Illinois	Rocky Miller Park	Big Ten	1		
Ohio State University	Buckeyes	Ohio	Bill Davis Stadium	Big Ten	22	1951, 1965, 1966, 1967	1966
University of Oregon	Ducks	Oregon	PK Park	Big Ten	10	1954	
Pennsylvania State University (Penn State)	Nittany Lions	Pennsylvania	Medlar Field at Lubrano Park	Big Ten	17	1952, 1957, 1959, 1963, 1973	
Purdue University	Boilermakers	Indiana	Alexander Field	Big Ten	3		
Rutgers University	Scarlet Knights	New Jersey	Bainton Field	Big Ten	15	1950	
University of California, Los Angeles (UCLA)	Bruins	California	Jackie Robinson Stadium	Big Ten	26	1969, 1997, 2010, 2012, 2013, 2025	2013
University of Southern California (USC/Southern Cal)	Trojans	California	Dedeaux Field	Big Ten	38	1948, 1949, 1951, 1955, 1958, 1960, 1961, 1963, 1964, 1966, 1968, 1970, 1971, 1972, 1973, 1974, 1978, 1995, 1998, 2000, 2001	1948, 1958, 1961, 1963, 1968, 1970, 1971, 1972, 1973, 1974, 1978, 1998
University of Washington	Huskies	Washington	Husky Ballpark	Big Ten	11		
University of Arizona	Wildcats	Arizona	Hi Corbett Field	Big 12	42	1954, 1955, 1956, 1958, 1959, 1960, 1963, 1966, 1970, 1976, 1979, 1980, 1985, 1986, 2004, 2012, 2016, 2021, 2025	1976, 1980, 1986, 2012
Arizona State University	Sun Devils	Arizona	Phoenix Municipal Stadium	Big 12	41	1964, 1965, 1967, 1969, 1972, 1973, 1975, 1976, 1977, 1978, 1981, 1983, 1984, 1987, 1988, 1993, 1994, 1998, 2005, 2007, 2009, 2010	1965, 1967, 1969, 1977, 1981
Baylor University	Bears	Texas	Baylor Ballpark	Big 12	21	1977, 1978, 2005	
Brigham Young University (BYU)	Cougars	Utah	Larry H. Miller Field	Big 12	16	1968, 1971	
University of Cincinnati	Bearcats	Ohio	UC Baseball Stadium	Big 12	7		
University of Houston	Cougars	Texas	Darryl & Lori Schroeder Park	Big 12	22	1953, 1967	
University of Kansas	Jayhawks	Kansas	Hoglund Ballpark	Big 12	6	1993	
Kansas State University	Wildcats	Kansas	Tointon Family Stadium	Big 12	5		
Oklahoma State University	Cowboys	Oklahoma	O'Brate Stadium	Big 12	48	1954, 1955, 1959, 1960, 1961, 1966, 1967, 1968, 1981, 1982, 1983, 1984, 1985, 1986, 1987, 1990, 1993, 1996, 1999, 2016	1959
Texas Christian University (TCU)	Horned Frogs	Texas	Lupton Stadium	Big 12	19	2010, 2014, 2015, 2016, 2017	
Texas Tech University	Red Raiders	Texas	Dan Law Field at Rip Griffin Park	Big 12	17	2014, 2016, 2018, 2019	
University of Central Florida (UCF)	Knights	Florida	John Euliano Park	Big 12	12		
University of Utah	Utes	Utah	America First Ballpark	Big 12	5	1951	
West Virginia University	Mountaineers	West Virginia	Monongalia County Ballpark	Big 12	14		
California Baptist University	Lancers	California	James W. Totman Stadium	Big West			
California Polytechnic State University (Cal Poly)	Mustangs	California	Robin Baggett Stadium	Big West	4		
California State University, Fullerton (Cal State Fullerton)	Titans	California	Goodwin Field	Big West	40	1975, 1979, 1982, 1984, 1988, 1990, 1992, 1994, 1995, 1999, 2001, 2003, 2004, 2006, 2007, 2009, 2015, 2017	1979, 1984, 1995, 2004
California State University, Northridge (CSUN/Cal State Northridge)	Matadors	California	Matador Field	Big West	6		(Div. II 1970, 1984)
California State University, Bakersfield (Bakersfield/CSU Bakersfield)	Roadrunners	California	Hardt Field	Big West	1		
California State University, Long Beach (Long Beach State)	Dirtbags	California	Blair Field	Big West	22	1989, 1991, 1993, 1998	
California State University, Sacramento (Sacramento State)	Hornets	California	John Smith Field	Big West	3		
University of California, Irvine (UC Irvine)	Anteaters	California	Cicerone Field	Big West	11	2007, 2014	(Div. II 1973, 1974)
University of California, Riverside (UC Riverside)	Highlanders	California	Riverside Sports Complex	Big West	2		(Div. II 1977)
University of California, San Diego (UC San Diego)	Tritons	California	Triton Ballpark	Big West (Note: UC San Diego joins, and UC Santa Barbara rejoins, the West Coast Conference in 2028.)			
University of California, Santa Barbara (UC Santa Barbara)	Gauchos	California	Caesar Uyesaka Stadium	Big West	14	2016	
Utah Valley University	Wolverines	Utah	UCCU Ballpark	Big West	2		
Campbell University	Fighting Camels	North Carolina	Jim Perry Stadium	Coastal Athletic	6		
College of Charleston (Charleston)	Cougars	South Carolina	CofC Baseball Stadium at Patriot's Point	Coastal Athletic	7		
Elon University	Phoenix	North Carolina	Walter C. Latham Park	Coastal Athletic	6		
Hofstra University	Pride	New York	University Field	Coastal Athletic	1		
Monmouth University	Hawks	New Jersey	Monmouth Baseball Field	Coastal Athletic	4		
North Carolina Agricultural and Technical State University (North Carolina A&T)	Aggies	North Carolina	World War Memorial Stadium	Coastal Athletic	2		
Northeastern University	Huskies	Massachusetts	Parsons Field/ Friedman Diamond	Coastal Athletic	10	1966	
Stony Brook University	Seawolves	New York	Joe Nathan Field	Coastal Athletic	6	2012	
Towson University	Tigers	Maryland	John B. Schuerholz; Baseball Complex	Coastal Athletic	3		
University of North Carolina Wilmington (UNC Wilmington/UNCW)	Seahawks	North Carolina	Brooks Field	Coastal Athletic	10		
College of William & Mary	Tribe	Virginia	Plumeri Park	Coastal Athletic	4		
University of Delaware	Fightin' Blue Hens	Delaware	Bob Hannah Stadium	Conference USA	16	1970	
Florida International University (FIU)	Panthers	Florida	FIU Baseball Stadium	Conference USA	11		
Jacksonville State University	Gamecocks	Alabama	Rudy Abbott Field	Conference USA	5		
Kennesaw State University	Owls	Georgia	Fred Stillwell Stadium	Conference USA	2		(Div. II 1996, NAIA 1994)
Liberty University	Flames	Virginia	Liberty Baseball Stadium	Conference USA	8		
Middle Tennessee State University (Middle Tennessee)	Blue Raiders	Tennessee	Reese Smith Jr. Field	Conference USA	13		
Missouri State University	Bears	Missouri	Hammons Field	Conference USA	12	2003	
New Mexico State University	Aggies	New Mexico	Presley Askew Field	Conference USA	5		
Sam Houston State University (Sam Houston)	Bearkats	Texas	Don Sanders Stadium	Conference USA	11		(NAIA 1963)
Western Kentucky University (WKU)	Hilltoppers	Kentucky	Nick Denes Field	Conference USA	5		
University of Wisconsin–Milwaukee (Milwaukee)	Panthers	Wisconsin	Franklin Field	Horizon League	4		
Northern Illinois University (NIU)	Huskies	Illinois	Ralph McKinzie Field	Horizon League	1		
Northern Kentucky University	Norse	Kentucky	Bill Aker Baseball Complex	Horizon League	1		
Oakland University	Golden Grizzlies	Michigan	Oakland University; Baseball Field	Horizon League			
Wright State University	Raiders	Ohio	Nischwitz Stadium	Horizon League	11		
Youngstown State University	Penguins	Ohio	Eastwood Field	Horizon League	2		
Brown University	Bears	Rhode Island	Murray Stadium	Ivy League	1		
Columbia University	Lions	New York	Hal Robertson Field at Phillip Satow Stadium	Ivy League	8		
Cornell University	Big Red	New York	Hoy Field	Ivy League	2		
Dartmouth College	Big Green	New Hampshire	Red Rolfe Field at Biondi Park	Ivy League	7	1970	
Harvard University	Crimson	Massachusetts	Joseph J. O'Donnell Field	Ivy League	15	1968, 1971, 1973, 1974	
University of Pennsylvania (Penn)	Quakers	Pennsylvania	Meiklejohn Stadium	Ivy League	5		
Princeton University	Tigers	New Jersey	Bill Clarke Field	Ivy League	12	1951	
Yale University	Bulldogs	Connecticut	Yale Field	Ivy League	6	1947, 1948	
Canisius University	Golden Griffins	New York	Demske Sports Complex	Metro	4		
Fairfield University	Stags	Connecticut	Alumni Baseball Diamond	Metro (Note: Fairfield joins the Coastal Athletic Association in 2028.)	3		
Iona University	Gaels	New York	City Park	Metro			
Manhattan University	Jaspers	New York	Clover Stadium	Metro	4		
Marist University	Red Foxes	New York	James J. McCann Baseball Field	Metro	7		
Merrimack College	Warriors	Massachusetts	Greater Lawrence Technical School	Metro			
Mount St. Mary's University	Mountaineers	Maryland	Straw Family Stadium	Metro	1		
Niagara University	Purple Eagles	New York	Sal Maglie Stadium	Metro	1		
Quinnipiac University	Bobcats	Connecticut	Quinnipiac Baseball Field	Metro	2		
Rider University	Broncs	New Jersey	Sonny Pittaro Field	Metro	13	1967	
Sacred Heart University	Pioneers	Connecticut	Veterans Memorial Park	Metro	4		
Saint Peter's University	Peacocks	New Jersey	Joseph J. Jaroschak Field	Metro			
Siena University	Saints	New York	Siena Baseball Field	Metro	2		
University of Akron	Zips	Ohio	Skeeles Field	Mid-American	1		
Ball State University	Cardinals	Indiana	Ball Diamond	Mid-American	3		
Bowling Green State University (Bowling Green)	Falcons	Ohio	Steller Field	Mid-American	4		
Central Michigan University	Chippewas	Michigan	Bill Theunissen Stadium	Mid-American	14		
Eastern Michigan University	Eagles	Michigan	Oestrike Stadium	Mid-American	7	1975, 1976	(NAIA 1970)
Kent State University	Golden Flashes	Ohio	Olga Mural Field at Schoonover Stadium	Mid-American	14	2012	
University of Massachusetts Amherst (Massachusetts/UMass)	Minutemen	Massachusetts	Earl Lorden Field	Mid-American	11	1954, 1969	
Miami University (Miami of Ohio)	RedHawks	Ohio	Stanley G. McKie Field at Joseph P. Hayden Jr. Park	Mid-American	8		
Ohio University	Bobcats	Ohio	Bob Wren Stadium	Mid-American	16	1970	
University of Toledo	Rockets	Ohio	Scott Park Baseball Complex	Mid-American			
Western Michigan University	Broncos	Michigan	Robert J. Bobb Stadium at Judson Hyames Field	Mid-American	12	1952, 1955, 1958, 1959, 1961, 1963	
Belmont University	Bruins	Tennessee	E. S. Rose Park	Missouri Valley	2		
Bradley University	Braves	Illinois	Dozer Park	Missouri Valley	7	1950, 1956	
University of Evansville	Purple Aces	Indiana	Charles H. Braun Stadium	Missouri Valley	3		
Illinois State University	Redbirds	Illinois	Duffy Bass Field	Missouri Valley	4		(Div. II 1969)
Indiana State University	Sycamores	Indiana	Sycamore Stadium	Missouri Valley	11	1986	
Murray State University	Racers	Kentucky	Reagan Field	Missouri Valley	4	2025	
Southern Illinois University Carbondale (Southern Illinois/SIU)	Salukis	Illinois	Itchy Jones Stadium	Missouri Valley	14	1968, 1969, 1971, 1974, 1977	
University of Illinois Chicago (UIC)	Flames	Illinois	Les Miller Field	Missouri Valley	6		
Valparaiso University	Beacons	Indiana	Emory G. Bauer Field	Missouri Valley	7		
United States Air Force Academy (Air Force)	Falcons	Colorado	Erdle Field	Mountain West	7		
Grand Canyon University	Antelopes	Arizona	Brazell Stadium	Mountain West	2		(NAIA 1980, 1981, 1982, 1988)
University of Hawaiʻi at Mānoa (Hawaiʻi)	Rainbow Warriors	Hawaii	Les Murakami Stadium	Mountain West	13	1980	
University of Nevada, Reno (Nevada)	Wolf Pack	Nevada	William Peccole Park	Mountain West	5		
University of New Mexico	Lobos	New Mexico	Santa Ana Star Field	Mountain West	4		
San Jose State University	Spartans	California	San Jose Municipal Stadium	Mountain West	4	2000	
University of California, Davis (UC Davis)	Aggies	California	Dobbins Stadium	Mountain West	1		
University of Nevada, Las Vegas (UNLV)	Rebels	Nevada	Earl Wilson Stadium	Mountain West	11		
Utah Tech University	Trailblazers	Utah	Bruce Hurst Field	Mountain West (Note: Utah Tech is an affiliate of the MW, and primarily plays in the Big Sky Conference.)			
Central Connecticut State University (Central Connecticut/CCSU)	Blue Devils	Connecticut	Balf–Savin Field	NEC	8		
Coppin State University	Eagles	Maryland	Joe Cannon Stadium	NEC (Note: Coppin State, Delaware State, Maryland Eastern Shore, and Norfolk State are affiliates of the NEC, and primarily play in the Mid-Eastern Athletic Conference.)	1		
Delaware State University	Hornets	Delaware	Soldier Field	NEC			
Fairleigh Dickinson University	Knights	New Jersey	Naimoli Family Baseball Complex	NEC			
Le Moyne College	Dolphins	New York	Dick Rockwell Field	NEC			
Long Island University (LIU)	Sharks	New York	Long Island University Baseball Stadium	NEC	3		
University of Maryland Eastern Shore (UMES)	Hawks	Maryland	Hawk Stadium	NEC			
Norfolk State University	Spartans	Virginia	Marty L. Miller Field	NEC	1		
Stonehill College	Skyhawks	Massachusetts	Lou Gorman Field	NEC			
Wagner College	Seahawks	New York	Richmond County Bank Ballpark	NEC	1		
Eastern Illinois University	Panthers	Illinois	Coaches Stadium at Monier Field	Ohio Valley	2		(Div. II 1990, 1991)
Lindenwood University	Lions	Missouri	Lou Brock Sports Complex	Ohio Valley			
Morehead State University	Eagles	Kentucky	Allen Field	Ohio Valley	4		
Southeast Missouri State University (Southeast Missouri/SEMO)	Redhawks	Missouri	Capaha Field	Ohio Valley	4		
Southern Illinois University Edwardsville (SIU Edwardsville/SIUE)	Cougars	Illinois	Roy E. Lee Field at Simmons Baseball Complex	Ohio Valley			
University of Southern Indiana	Screaming Eagles	Indiana	USI Baseball Field	Ohio Valley			(Div. II 2010, 2014)
University of Tennessee at Martin (UT Martin)	Skyhawks	Tennessee	Skyhawk Park	Ohio Valley			
Western Illinois University	Leathernecks	Illinois	Alfred D. Boyer Stadium	Ohio Valley			
Dallas Baptist University	Patriots	Texas	Horner Ballpark	Pac-12 (Note: Dallas Baptist is an affiliate of the Pac-12 Conference, and primarily plays in the Division II Lone Star Conference.)	12		
California State University, Fresno (Fresno State)	Bulldogs	California	Pete Beiden Field	Pac-12	36	1959, 1988, 1991, 2008	2008
Gonzaga University	Bulldogs	Washington	Washington Trust Field and Patterson Baseball Complex	Pac-12	12		
Oregon State University	Beavers	Oregon	Goss Stadium at Coleman Field	Pac-12	22	1952, 2005, 2006, 2007, 2013, 2017, 2018, 2025	2006, 2007, 2018
San Diego State University	Aztecs	California	Tony Gwynn Stadium	Pac-12	14		(NAIA 1958)
Texas State University	Bobcats	Texas	Bobcat Baseball Stadium	Pac-12	6		
Washington State University	Cougars	Washington	Bailey-Brayton Field	Pac-12	16	1950, 1956, 1965, 1976	
United States Military Academy (Army)	Black Knights	New York	Johnson Stadium at Doubleday Field	Patriot League	10		
Bucknell University	Bison	Pennsylvania	Eugene B. Depew Field	Patriot League	6		
College of the Holy Cross	Crusaders	Massachusetts	Hanover Insurance Park at Fitton Field	Patriot League	12	1952, 1958, 1962, 1963	1952
Lafayette College	Leopards	Pennsylvania	Kamine Stadium	Patriot League	10	1953, 1954, 1958, 1965	
Lehigh University	Mountain Hawks	Pennsylvania	Lehigh Baseball Field	Patriot League	2		
United States Naval Academy (Navy)	Midshipmen	Maryland	Terwilliger Brothers Field at Max Bishop Stadium	Patriot League	9		
University of Alabama	Crimson Tide	Alabama	Sewell–Thomas Stadium	Southeastern	26	1950, 1983, 1996, 1997, 1999	
University of Arkansas	Razorbacks	Arkansas	Baum–Walker Stadium	Southeastern	34	1979, 1985, 1987, 1989, 2004, 2009, 2012, 2015, 2018, 2019, 2022, 2025	
Auburn University	Tigers	Alabama	Samford Stadium – Hitchcock Field at Plainsman Park	Southeastern	24	1967, 1976, 1994, 1997, 2019, 2022	
University of Florida	Gators	Florida	Condron Ballpark	Southeastern	38	1988, 1991, 1996, 1998, 2005, 2010, 2011, 2012, 2015, 2016, 2017, 2018, 2024	2017
University of Georgia	Bulldogs	Georgia	Foley Field	Southeastern	16	1987, 1990, 2001, 2004, 2006, 2008	1990
University of Kentucky	Wildcats	Kentucky	Kentucky Proud Park	Southeastern	8	2024	
Louisiana State University (LSU)	Tigers	Louisiana	Alex Box Stadium, Skip Bertman Field	Southeastern	39	1986, 1987, 1989, 1990, 1991, 1993, 1994, 1996, 1997, 1998, 2000, 2003, 2004, 2008, 2009, 2013, 2015, 2017, 2023, 2025	1991, 1993, 1996, 1997, 2000, 2009, 2023, 2025
University of Mississippi (Ole Miss)	Rebels	Mississippi	Swayze Field	Southeastern	26	1956, 1964, 1969, 1972, 2014, 2022	2022
Mississippi State University	Bulldogs	Mississippi	Dudy Noble Field, Polk-DeMent Stadium	Southeastern	40	1971, 1979, 1981, 1985, 1990, 1997, 1998, 2007, 2013, 2018, 2019, 2021	2021
University of Missouri (alternately Mizzou)	Tigers	Missouri	Taylor Stadium	Southeastern	22	1952, 1954, 1958, 1962, 1963, 1964	1954
University of Oklahoma	Sooners	Oklahoma	Kimrey Family Stadium	Southeastern	39	1951, 1972, 1973, 1974, 1975, 1976, 1992, 1994, 1995, 2010, 2022	1951, 1994, 2026
University of South Carolina	Gamecocks	South Carolina	Carolina Stadium	Southeastern	33	1975, 1977, 1981, 1982, 1985, 2002, 2003, 2004, 2010, 2011, 2012	2010, 2011
University of Tennessee	Volunteers	Tennessee	Lindsey Nelson Stadium	Southeastern	15	1951, 1995, 2001, 2005, 2021, 2023, 2024	2024
University of Texas at Austin (Texas)	Longhorns	Texas	UFCU Disch–Falk Field	Southeastern	62	1949, 1950, 1952, 1953, 1957, 1961, 1962, 1963, 1965, 1966, 1968, 1969, 1970, 1972, 1973, 1974, 1975, 1979, 1981, 1982, 1983, 1984, 1985, 1987, 1989, 1992, 1993, 2000, 2002, 2003, 2004, 2005, 2009, 2011, 2014, 2018, 2022	1949, 1950, 1975, 1983, 2002, 2005
Texas A&M University (TAMU)	Aggies	Texas	Olsen Field at Blue Bell Park	Southeastern	36	1951, 1964, 1993, 1999, 2011, 2017, 2022, 2024	
Vanderbilt University	Commodores	Tennessee	Hawkins Field	Southeastern	21	2011, 2014, 2015, 2019	2014, 2019
The Citadel, The Military College of South Carolina (The Citadel)	Bulldogs	South Carolina	Joseph P. Riley Jr. Park	Southern	13	1990	
East Tennessee State University (ETSU)	Buccaneers	Tennessee	Thomas Stadium	Southern	5		
Mercer University	Bears	Georgia	Claude Smith Field	Southern	4		
Samford University	Bulldogs	Alabama	Joe Lee Griffin Stadium	Southern	3		
Tennessee Tech University	Golden Eagles	Tennessee	Bush Stadium at Averitt Express Baseball Complex	Southern	6		
University of North Carolina at Greensboro (UNC Greensboro/UNCG)	Spartans	North Carolina	UNCG Baseball Stadium	Southern	4		
Virginia Military Institute (VMI)	Keydets	Virginia	Gray–Minor Stadium	Southern			
Western Carolina University	Catamounts	North Carolina	Hennon Stadium	Southern	12		
Wofford College	Terriers	South Carolina	Russell C. King Field	Southern	1		
Houston Christian University	Huskies	Texas	Husky Field	Southland	2		
University of the Incarnate Word (alternately UIW)	Cardinals	Texas	Sullivan Field	Southland			
Lamar University	Cardinals	Texas	Vincent–Beck Stadium	Southland	13		
LSU New Orleans	Privateers	Louisiana	Maestri Field at Privateer Park	Southland	14	1984	
McNeese State University (McNeese)	Cowboys	Louisiana	Joe Miller Ballpark	Southland	6		
Nicholls State University (Nicholls)	Colonels	Louisiana	Ben Meyer Diamond at Ray E. Didier Field	Southland	3		
Northwestern State University	Demons	Louisiana	H. Alvin Brown–C. C. Stroud Field	Southland	4		
Southeastern Louisiana University	Lions	Louisiana	Pat Kenelly Diamond at Alumni Field	Southland	7		
Stephen F. Austin State University (Stephen F. Austin/SFA)	Lumberjacks	Texas	Jaycees Field	Southland			
Texas A&M University–Corpus Christi	Islanders	Texas	Chapman Field	Southland			
University of Texas Rio Grande Valley (UTRGV)	Vaqueros	Texas	UTRGV Baseball Stadium	Southland	13 (Note: UTRGV was founded in 2013 and began full operation in 2015, following the merger of two University of Texas System campuses—the NCAA Division I University of Texas–Pan American (UTPA) and the University of Texas at Brownsville, a member of the NAIA. The former UTPA athletic program became the UTRGV program after the merger; UTRGV is therefore credited with all of UTPA's appearances in the NCAA tournament.)	1971	
Alabama A&M University	Bulldogs	Alabama	Bulldog Field	SWAC			
Alabama State University	Hornets	Alabama	Wheeler–Watkins; Baseball Complex	SWAC	2		
Alcorn State University	Braves	Mississippi	Foster Baseball Field at McGowan Stadium	SWAC	1		
University of Arkansas at Pine Bluff (Arkansas–Pine Bluff)	Golden Lions	Arkansas	Torii Hunter Baseball Complex	SWAC			
Bethune–Cookman University	Wildcats	Florida	Jackie Robinson Ballpark	SWAC	18		
Florida Agricultural and Mechanical University (Florida A&M)	Rattlers	Florida	Moore–Kittles Field	SWAC	2		
Grambling State University	Tigers	Louisiana	Wilbert Ellis Field at Ralph Waldo Emerson Jones Park	SWAC	4		
Jackson State University	Tigers	Mississippi	Braddy Field	SWAC	6		
Mississippi Valley State University	Delta Devils	Mississippi	Magnolia Field	SWAC			
Prairie View A&M University	Panthers	Texas	John W. Tankersley Field	SWAC	3		
Southern University	Jaguars	Louisiana	Lee–Hines Stadium	SWAC	10		(NAIA 1959)
Texas Southern University	Tigers	Texas	MacGregor Park	SWAC	5		
North Dakota State University	Bison	North Dakota	Newman Outdoor Field	The Summit	4		
University of Northern Colorado	Bears	Colorado	Jackson Field	The Summit (Note: Northern Colorado is an affiliate of the Summit League, and primarily plays in the Big Sky Conference.)	21	1952, 1953, 1955, 1957, 1958, 1959, 1960, 1961, 1962, 1974	
University of Nebraska Omaha (Omaha)	Mavericks	Nebraska	Tal Anderson Field	The Summit	1		
Oral Roberts University	Golden Eagles	Oklahoma	J. L. Johnson Stadium	The Summit	28	1978, 2023	
University of St. Thomas	Tommies	Minnesota	Koch Diamond	The Summit			(Div. III 2001, 2009)
South Dakota State University	Jackrabbits	South Dakota	Erv Huether Field	The Summit	1		
Appalachian State University	Mountaineers	North Carolina	Beaver Field at Jim and Bettie Smith Stadium	Sun Belt	4		
Arkansas State University	Red Wolves	Arkansas	Tomlinson Stadium–Kell Field	Sun Belt	2		
Coastal Carolina University	Chanticleers	South Carolina	Springs Brooks Stadium/ Vrooman Field	Sun Belt	19	2016, 2025	2016
Georgia Southern University	Eagles	Georgia	J. I. Clements Stadium	Sun Belt	14	1973, 1990	(NAIA 1982)
Georgia State University	Panthers	Georgia	Georgia State University; Baseball Complex	Sun Belt	1		
James Madison University	Dukes	Virginia	Eagle Field at Veterans Memorial Park	Sun Belt (Note: James Madison will join the American Conference no later than 2029.)	8	1983	
University of Louisiana at Lafayette (Louisiana)	Ragin' Cajuns	Louisiana	M. L. Tigue Moore Field	Sun Belt	17	2000	
University of Louisiana at Monroe (Louisiana–Monroe/ULM)	Warhawks	Louisiana	Warhawk Field	Sun Belt	5		
Louisiana Tech University	Bulldogs	Louisiana	J. C. Love Field at Pat Patterson Park	Sun Belt	10		
Marshall University	Thundering Herd	West Virginia	Jack Cook Field	Sun Belt	2		
Old Dominion University	Monarchs	Virginia	Bud Metheny Ballpark	Sun Belt	9		
University of South Alabama	Jaguars	Alabama	Eddie Stanky Field	Sun Belt	28		
University of Southern Mississippi (Southern Miss)	Golden Eagles	Mississippi	Pete Taylor Park	Sun Belt	19	2009	
Troy University	Trojans	Alabama	Riddle-Pace Field	Sun Belt	7		(Div. II 1986, 1987)
Abilene Christian University	Wildcats	Texas	Crutcher Scott Field	United Athletic			
Austin Peay State University (Austin Peay)	Governors	Tennessee	Raymond C. Hand Park	United Athletic	6		
University of Central Arkansas	Bears	Arkansas	Bear Stadium	United Athletic	1		
Eastern Kentucky University (EKU)	Colonels	Kentucky	Turkey Hughes Field	United Athletic	4		
University of Arkansas at Little Rock (Little Rock)	Trojans	Arkansas	Gary Hogan Field	United Athletic	2		
University of North Alabama	Lions	Alabama	Bank Independent Stadium	United Athletic			
Tarleton State University	Texans	Texas	Cecil Ballow Baseball Complex	United Athletic			
University of Texas at Arlington (UT Arlington/UTA)	Mavericks	Texas	Clay Gould Ballpark	United Athletic	5		
Loyola Marymount University (alternately LMU)	Lions	California	George C. Page Stadium	West Coast	9	1986	
University of the Pacific	Tigers	California	Klein Family Field	West Coast			
Pepperdine University	Waves	California	Eddy D. Field Stadium	West Coast	27	1979, 1992	1992
University of Portland	Pilots	Oregon	Joe Etzel Field	West Coast	5		
Saint Mary's College of California (Saint Mary's/SMC)	Gaels	California	Louis Guisto Field	West Coast	2		
University of San Diego	Toreros	California	John Cunningham Stadium	West Coast	9		
University of San Francisco	Dons	California	Dante Benedetti Diamond at Max Ulrich Field	West Coast	3		
Santa Clara University	Broncos	California	Stephen Schott Stadium	West Coast	11	1962	
Seattle University	Redhawks	Washington	Bannerwood Park	West Coast	1		

=== Future programs ===
School (Branded as or widely known as)	Nickname	State	Home field	Conference	First playing
Tennessee State University	Tigers	Tennessee	TBA	Ohio Valley	2028 (at latest)

== Schools in transition ==
These schools are in transition from Division II to Division I. For scheduling purposes, they are considered to be Division I institutions, but they will not be eligible for the NCAA tournament until completing the transition.

School	Nickname	State	Home field	Conference	National titles	Full membership
Mercyhurst University	Lakers	Pennsylvania	Mercyhurst Baseball Field	NEC		July 2027
University of New Haven	Chargers	Connecticut	Frank Vieira Field	NEC		July 2028
University of West Florida	Argonauts	Florida	Jim Spooner Field	Atlantic Sun		July 2029
University of West Georgia	Wolves	Georgia	Cole Field	United Athletic		July 2027

== See also ==
- List of current NCAA Division I baseball coaches
- List of NCAA Division I baseball venues
- List of defunct college baseball teams
