= 2021 Dixie State Trailblazers baseball team =

American college baseball season

2021 Dixie State Trailblazers baseball
- Conference: Western Athletic Conference
- Record: 24-32 (21-15 Western Athletic Conference)
- Head coach: Chris Pfatenhauer (9th season)
- Assistant coaches: Bobby Rinard (7th season); Matt Hill (7th season)
- Pitching coach: Zach Wilkins (2nd season)
- Home stadium: Bruce Hurst Field

2021 Western Athletic Conference baseball standings
	Conf.						Overall
Team	W		L		T	PCT	W		L		T	PCT
California Baptist ‍†‍‍	29	–	7	–	0	.806	40	–	16	–	0	.714
Grand Canyon ‍‍‡‍^{y}	29	–	7	–	0	.806	39	–	21	–	1	.648
Sacramento State ‍‍‍	22	–	14	–	0	.611	35	–	22	–	0	.614
Dixie State ‍‍‍	21	–	15	–	0	.583	24	–	32	–	0	.429
UTRGV ‍‍‍	20	–	15	–	0	.571	32	–	26	–	0	.552
New Mexico State ‍‍‍	16	–	20	–	0	.444	20	–	34	–	0	.370
Tarleton State ‍‍‍	13	–	23	–	0	.361	20	–	35	–	0	.364
Seattle ‍‍‍	10	–	22	–	0	.313	18	–	33	–	0	.353
Northern Colorado ‍‍‍	7	–	24	–	0	.226	11	–	36	–	0	.234
Utah Valley ‍‍‍	8	–	28	–	0	.222	10	–	47	–	0	.175
† – Conference champion ‡ – Tournament champion y – Invited to the NCAA tournament As of June 5, 2021; Rankings from D1Baseball

The 2021 Dixie State Trailblazers baseball team represented Dixie State University during the 2021 NCAA Division I baseball season. Dixie State competed in the Western Athletic Conference (WAC). The Trailblazers played their home games at Bruce Hurst Field. Coach Chris Pfatenhauer led Dixie State in his 9th season with the program. The season was Dixie's first as a Division I institution.

== Previous season ==
The Trailblazers finished 15–3 overall, and 4–0 in the Rocky Mountain Athletic Conference. The season was prematurely cut short due to the COVID-19 pandemic.

== Personnel ==
=== Roster ===
2021 Dixie State Trailblazers roster
Pitchers: 14 - Zach Thomas - Sophomore; 15 - Ben Hart - Freshman; 18 - Brett Porthan - Freshman; 19 - Tevita Gerber - (redshirt) Senior; 21 - Ryan Hardman - Freshman; 22 - Haiden Hendricks - Junior; 23 - Jack Gonzales - Junior; 26 - Justin Dunham - Junior; 29 - Dillon Holliday - (redshirt) Freshman; 30 - Drew D'Ambra - (redshirt) Sophomore; 32 - Brayden Bonner - Senior; 35 - Sam Clow - (redshirt) Freshman; 36 - Carson Phillips - Sophomore; 40 - Jimmy Borzone - Junior; 43 - Justin Woodbury - Freshman; 44 - Zach Hansen - Junior; 45 - Ethan Fowlks - (redshirt) Freshman; 50 - Jed Jensen - (redshirt) Sophomore	Catchers: 17 - Tanner Harper - (redshirt) Junior; 27 - Kaden Hollow - Freshman; 33 - Cade Spurlin - Senior; 48 - Hank Dodson - Freshman; Infielders: 2 - Trey Allred - (redshirt) Freshman; 10 - Tanner Argyle - Junior; 12 - Jake Schulz - Freshman; 24 - Tyler Hollow - Junior; 28 - Matthew Ivancich - Junior; 38 - Shane Taylor - Freshman; 41 - Bryce Thelander - (redshirt) Freshman; 46 - Tyson Fisher - Sophomore	Outfielders: 1 - Jagun Leavitt - Junior; 5 - Drake Benner - (redshirt) Sophomore; 6 - Ben Petty-Hull - (redshirt) Sophomore; 7 - Lane Pritchard - Senior; 11 - Jack Walker - Freshman; 16 - Landon Levine - Freshman; 31 - Jackson Kohler - Sophomore; Utility: 8 - Chase Rodriguez - Freshman; 34 - Jake Engel - Senior

=== Coaching staff ===
2021 Dixie State coaching staff
Name	Position	Seasons at Dixie State	Alma mater
Chris Pfatenhauer	Head coach	9	Southwest Baptist
Bobby Rinard	Assistant head coach/Recruiting Coordinator	7	Arizona
Matt Hill	Volunteer Assistant Coach	7	Dixie State
Zach Wilkins	Pitching Coach	2	Nevada

== Schedule and results ==
Legend
	Trailblazers win
	Trailblazers loss
	Postponement
**Bold**	Trailblazers team member

2021 Dixie State Trailblazers baseball game log
Regular season (24-32)

February (0-4)
Date	Opponent	Rank	Site/stadium	Score	Win	Loss	Save	TV	Overall record	WAC record
February 25	Washington State*		Bruce Hurst Field; St. George, Utah	**L** 2–4	Newstrom (2–0)	**Gerber (0–1)**	—	WAC Digital Network	0–1	—
February 26	Washington State*		Bruce Hurst Field; St. George, Utah	**L** 5-19	Mills (2–0)	**Gonzales (0–1)**	—	WAC Digital Network	0–2	—
February 27	Washington State*		Bruce Hurst Field; St. George, Utah	**L** 1-15	White (2–0)	**Phillips (0–1)**	—	WAC Digital Network	0–3	—
February 28	Washington State*		Bruce Hurst Field; St. George, Utah	**L** 3-10	Hawkins (1–1)	**Hart (0–1)**	—	WAC Digital Network	0–4	—

March (6–11)
Date	Opponent	Rank	Site/stadium	Score	Win	Loss	Save	TV	Overall record	WAC record
March 5	Wichita State*		Eck Stadium; Wichita, Kansas	**L** 1-2	Barnhouse (1-0)	**Borzone (0–1)**	—	ESPN+	0-5	—
March 6	Wichita State*		Eck Stadium; Wichita, Kansas	**L** 3-15	Hynes (1-1)	**Gonzales (0–2)**	—		0-6	—
March 7	Wichita State*		Eck Stadium; Wichita, Kansas	**L** 7-15	Snavely (1-0)	**Phillips (0–2)**	—	ESPN+	0-7	—
March 12	New Mexico State		Presley Askew Field; Las Cruces, New Mexico	**L** 3-17(7)	Barraza (1-1)	**Borzone (0–2)**	—	WAC Digital Network	0-8	0-1
March 13	New Mexico State		Presley Askew Field; Las Cruces, New Mexico	**L** 3-14(6)	Jefferson (2-1)	**Hardman (0–1)**	—	WAC Digital Network	0-9	0-2
March 13	New Mexico State		Presley Askew Field; Las Cruces, New Mexico	**L** 2-19(7)	Laukkanen (1-3)	**Hart (0–2)**	—	WAC Digital Network	0-10	0-3
March 14	New Mexico State		Presley Askew Field; Las Cruces, New Mexico	**W** 19-13	**Thomas (1-0)**	Mejia (0–1)	—	WAC Digital Network	1-10	1-3
March 16	Brigham Young*		Bruce Hurst Field; St. George, Utah	**W** 5-4	**Bonner (1-0)**	Johnson (0–3)	—	WAC Digital Network	2-10	1-3
March 19	UTRGV Vaqueros		Bruce Hurst Field; St. George, Utah	**W** 7-6	**Bonner (2-0)**	Kisner (0–1)	—	WAC Digital Network	3-10	2-3
March 20	UTRGV Vaqueros		Bruce Hurst Field; St. George, Utah	**L** 3-13(6)	Balderrama Jr. (3-0)	**Hardman (0–2)**	—	WAC Digital Network	3-11	2-4
March 20	UTRGV Vaqueros		Bruce Hurst Field; St. George, Utah	**L** 1-18(7)	Davis (4-0)	**Hart (0–3)**	—	WAC Digital Network	3-12	2-5
March 21	UTRGV Vaqueros		Bruce Hurst Field; St. George, Utah	**W** 3-2	**Gerber (1-1)**	Ariza (0–2)	**Bonner (1)**	WAC Digital Network	4-12	3-5
March 23	Utah*		Smith's Ballpark; Salt Lake City, Utah	**W** 9-7	**Holliday (1-0)**	Schramm (0–1)	**Bonner (2)**	Utah Live Stream	5-12	3-5
March 26	Sacramanto State		John Smith Field; Sacramento, California	**L** 3-9	Randall (4-0)	**Borzone (0–3)**	—	WAC Digital Network	5-13	3-6
March 27	Sacramento State		John Smith Field; Sacramento, California	**L** 4-9	Rodriguez (4-0)	**Hardman (0–3)**	—	WAC Digital Network	5-14	3-7
March 27	Sacramento State		John Smith Field; Sacramento, California	**L** 5-10	Martizia (2-0)	**Hart (0–3)**	Zalasky (1)	WAC Digital Network	5-15	3-8
March 28	Sacramento State		John Smith Field; Sacramento, California	**W** 7-5	**Holliday (2-0)**	Martizia (2-1)	**Bonner (3)**	WAC Digital Network	6-15	4-8

April (6–11)
Date	Opponent	Rank	Site/stadium	Score	Win	Loss	Save	TV	Overall record	WAC record
April 1	Tarleton State		Cecil Ballow Baseball Complex; Stephenville, Texas	**L** 9-10(10)	Wood (1–1)	**Bonner (2–1)**	–	WAC Digital Network	6-16	4-9
April 2	Tarleton State		Cecil Ballow Baseball Complex; Stephenville, Texas	**W** 5-1	**Borzone (1-3)**	Baley (3-2)	-	WAC Digital Network	7-16	5-9
April 2	Tarleton State		Cecil Ballow Baseball Complex; Stephenville, Texas	**W** 7-4	**Hart (1-4)**	Jacobs (0-1)	**Holliday (1)**	WAC Digital Network	8-16	6-9
April 3	Tarleton State		Cecil Ballow Baseball Complex; Stephenville, Texas	**W** 13-9	**Gonzales (1-2)**	Hackett (0-3)	-	WAC Digital Network	9-16	7-9
April 6	Utah*		Bruce Hurst Field; St. George, Utah	**L** 3-16	Sox (3-0)	**Holliday (2–1)**	-	WAC Digital Network	9-17	7-9
April 9	USC*		Dedeaux Field; Los Angeles, California	**L** 1-14	Esqueda (4-1)	**Borzone (1–4)**	-	USC Live Stream	9-18	7-9
April 10	USC*		Dedeaux Field; Los Angeles, California	**L** 3-10	Champlain (2-2)	**Hardman (0-4)**	-	USC Live Stream	9-19	7-9
April 11	USC*		Dedeaux Field; Los Angeles, California	**L** 5-6	Cornwell (4-3)	**Gonzales (1–3)**	-	USC Live Stream	9-20	7-9
April 16	California Baptist		Bruce Hurst Field; St. George, Utah	**W** 3-1	**Holliday (3-1)**	Burica (5–3)	**Bonner (4)**	WAC Digital Network	10-20	8-9
April 17	California Baptist		Bruce Hurst Field; St. George, Utah	**W** 2-1	**Borzone (2-4)**	Pope (4–4)	**Bonner (5)**	WAC Digital Network	11-20	9-9
April 17	California Baptist		Bruce Hurst Field; St. George, Utah	**L** 4-7	McCarvel (3-1)	**Dunham (0-1)**	Culpepper (10)	WAC Digital Network	11-21	9-10
April 18	California Baptist		Bruce Hurst Field; St. George, Utah	**L** 8-14	Bengard (2-0)	**Thomas (1-1)**	-	WAC Digital Network	11-22	9-11
April 20	Brigham Young*		Miller Park; Provo, Utah	**L** 2-3	Neilson (2-2)	**Hendricks (0-1)**	Mclaughlin (4)	BYUtv App	11-23	9-11
April 24	San Diego State*		Tony Gwynn Stadium; San Diego, California	**L** 7-8	Winston (2-1)	**Gonzales (1-4)**	-	-	11-24	9-11
April 24	San Diego State*		Tony Gwynn Stadium; San Diego, California	**L** 4-5(10)	Brown (5-1)	**Bonner (2-2)**	-	-	11-25	9-11
April 25	San Diego State*		Tony Gwynn Stadium; San Diego, California	**L** 1-9	Tibbett (3-1)	**Hardman (0-5)**	-	-	11-26	9-11
April 30	Utah Valley		Bruce Hurst Field; St. George, Utah	**W** 9-8(10)	**Thomas (2-1)**	Yocum (0-2)	-	WAC Digital Network	12-26	10-11

May (11–6)
Date	Opponent	Rank	Site/stadium	Score	Win	Loss	Save	TV	Overall record	WAC record
May 1	Utah Valley		Bruce Hurst Field; St. George, Utah	**W** 10-9(8)	**Gonzales (2-4)**	Smith (1-1)	-	WAC Digital Network	13-26	11-11
May 1	Utah Valley		Bruce Hurst Field; St. George, Utah	**W** 4-2	baseball **Porthan (1-0)**	Voortmeyer (2-6)	-	WAC Digital Network	14-26	12-11
May 2	Utah Valley		Bruce Hurst Field; St. George, Utah	**W** 10-9(8)	**Hardman (1-5)**	Sims (1-6)	-	WAC Digital Network	15-26	13-11
May 7	Grand Canyon		Brazell Field at GCU Ballpark; Phoenix, Arizona	**L** 0-10(7)	Ohl (7-1)	**Holliday (3-2)**	-	WAC Digital Network	15-27	13-12
May 8	Grand Canyon		Brazell Field at GCU Ballpark; Phoenix, Arizona	**L** 0-5	Young (7-0)	**Borzone (2-5)**	-	WAC Digital Network	15-28	13-13
May 8	Grand Canyon		Brazell Field at GCU Ballpark; Phoenix, Arizona	**L** 3-4(10)	Scalzo (2-2)	**Hart (1-5)**	-	WAC Digital Network	15-29	13-14
May 9	Grand Canyon		Brazell Field at GCU Ballpark; Phoenix, Arizona	**L** 3-6	Barnes (5-5)	**Hardman (1-6)**	Scalzo (8)	WAC Digital Network	15-30	13-15
May 14	Seattle U		Bruce Hurst Field; St. George, Utah	**W** 6-3	**Holliday (4-2)**	White (1-4)	**Gonzales (1)**	WAC Digital Network	16-30	14-15
May 15	Seattle U		Bruce Hurst Field; St. George, Utah	**W** 9-7	**Hart (2-5)**	Petersen (0-2)	**Bonner (6)**	WAC Digital Network	17-30	15-15
May 15	Seattle U		Bruce Hurst Field; St. George, Utah	**W** 14-13	**Bonner (3-2)**	Liddle (1-2)	-	WAC Digital Network	18-30	16-15
May 15	Seattle U		Bruce Hurst Field; St. George, Utah	**W** 14-4	**Hardman (2-6)**	Sinclair (0-5)	-	WAC Digital Network	19-30	17-15
May 20	Northern Colorado		Bruce Hurst Field; St. George, Utah	**W** 6-3	**Holliday (5-2)**	Bowers (2-5)	-	WAC Digital Network	20-30	18-15
May 21	Northern Colorado		Bruce Hurst Field; St. George, Utah	**W** 11-2	**Borzone (3-5)**	Leach (3-7)	-	WAC Digital Network	21-30	19-15
May 21	Northern Colorado		Bruce Hurst Field; St. George, Utah	**W** 6-3	**Porthan (2-0)**	Rust (2-3)	**Bonner (7)**	WAC Digital Network	22-30	20-15
May 22	Northern Colorado		Bruce Hurst Field; St. George, Utah	**W** 9-6	**Hardman (3-6)**	Day (0-3)	-	WAC Digital Network	23-30	21-15
May 27	Arizona*	No. 6	Hi Corbett Field; Tucson, Arizona	**L** 2-4	Abshier (4-0)	**Gonzales (2-5)**	Luna (1)	Arizona Live Stream	23-31	21-15
May 28	Arizona*	No. 6	Hi Corbett Field; Tucson, Arizona	**W** 11-9	**Hart (3-5)**	Flanagan (0-4)	**Hardman (1)**	Arizona Live Stream	24-31	21-15
May 29	Arizona*	No. 6	Hi Corbett Field; Tucson, Arizona	**L** 4-5	Vanelle (5-2)	**Gerber (1-2)**	-	Arizona Live Stream	24-32	21-15

*Denotes non–conference game • Schedule source • Rankings based on the teams' current ranking in the Collegiate Baseball poll
