= List of NCAA Division I baseball venues =

This is a list of stadiums that currently serve as the home venue for NCAA Division I college baseball teams. Conference affiliations reflect those in the upcoming 2027 NCAA baseball season. In addition, venues which are not located on campus or are used infrequently during the season have been listed. Among Division I conferences that sponsor men's and women's basketball, the Big Sky Conference and Mid-Eastern Athletic Conference are the only ones that do not sponsor baseball.

Years of conference changes reflect baseball seasons, which take place in the calendar year after schools join their new conferences.

== Current stadiums ==
Off-campus stadium

Image	Stadium	City	State	Team	Conference	Capacity	Opened	Ref.
	Varsity Field	Albany	NY	Albany	America East	500	c.1980	
	Binghamton Baseball Stadium Complex	Vestal (Note: Mailing address is Binghamton.)	NY	Binghamton	America East	1,906	2022	
	Conaty Park	Smithfield	RI	Bryant	America East	500	2012	
	Mahaney Diamond	Orono	ME	Maine	America East	4,400	Early 1980s	
	Yogi Berra Stadium	Little Falls	NJ	NJIT	America East	5,000	1998	
	Edward A. LeLacheur Park	Lowell	MA	UMass Lowell	America East	5,030	1998	
	Alumni Field (MD)	Catonsville (Note: Mailing address is Baltimore.)	MD	UMBC	America East	1,000	N/A, renovated 2004	
	Robert and Mariam Hayes Stadium	Charlotte	NC	Charlotte	American	4,100	1994	
	Clark–LeClair Stadium	Greenville	NC	East Carolina	American	6,000	2005	
	FAU Baseball Stadium	Boca Raton	FL	Florida Atlantic	American	2,000	1991	
	FedExPark	Memphis	TN	Memphis	American	2,000	1972	
	Reckling Park	Houston	TX	Rice	American	7,000	2000	
	USF Baseball Stadium	Tampa	FL	South Florida	American	3,211	2011	
	Greer Field at Turchin Stadium	New Orleans	LA	Tulane	American	5,000	1991, destroyed 2005 by Hurricane Katrina, rebuilt 2007	
	Jerry D. Young Memorial Field	Birmingham	AL	UAB	American	1,000	1984	
	Roadrunner Field	San Antonio	TX	UTSA	American	800	1993	
	Eck Stadium	Wichita	KS	Wichita State	American	7,851	1978, renovated 2009	
	Knights Field	Louisville	KY	Bellarmine	ASUN	500	1954	
	Swanson Stadium	Fort Myers (Note: The mailing address is Fort Myers, but the ballpark is in unincorporated Lee County.)	FL	Florida Gulf Coast	ASUN	1,500	2004	
	John Sessions Stadium	Jacksonville	FL	Jacksonville	ASUN	1,500	—N/a	
	Ken Dugan Field at Stephen Lee Marsh Stadium	Nashville	TN	Lipscomb	ASUN	1,500	1991	
	Harmon Stadium	Jacksonville	FL	North Florida	ASUN	1,250	1993	
	Tuckaseegee Dream Fields	Charlotte	NC	Queens	ASUN	350	—N/a	
	Melching Field at Conrad Park	DeLand	FL	Stetson	ASUN	2,500	1999	
	Cole Field	Carrollton	GA	West Georgia	UAC	500	1967	
	Eddie Pellagrini Diamond	Boston	MA	Boston College	Atlantic Coast	2,500	2018	
	Evans Diamond	Berkeley	CA	California	Atlantic Coast	2,500	1933	
	Doug Kingsmore Stadium	Clemson	SC	Clemson	Atlantic Coast	6,272	1970	
	Jack Coombs Field	Durham	NC	Duke	Atlantic Coast	2,000	1931	
	Mike Martin Field at Dick Howser Stadium	Tallahassee	FL	Florida State	Atlantic Coast	6,700	1983	
	Russ Chandler Stadium	Atlanta	GA	Georgia Tech	Atlantic Coast	3,517	1930	
	Jim Patterson Stadium	Louisville	KY	Louisville	Atlantic Coast	4,000	2005	
	Alex Rodriguez Park at Mark Light Field	Coral Gables	FL	Miami (FL)	Atlantic Coast	5,000	1973	
	Boshamer Stadium	Chapel Hill	NC	North Carolina	Atlantic Coast	5,000	1972	
	Doak Field	Raleigh	NC	North Carolina State	Atlantic Coast	3,000	1966	
	Frank Eck Stadium	Notre Dame	IN	Notre Dame	Atlantic Coast	2,500	1994	
	Charles L. Cost Field	Pittsburgh	PA	Pittsburgh	Atlantic Coast	900	2011	
	Klein Field at Sunken Diamond	Stanford	CA	Stanford	Atlantic Coast	4,000	1931	
	Davenport Field at Disharoon Park	Charlottesville	VA	Virginia	Atlantic Coast	5,919	2000	
	English Field	Blacksburg	VA	Virginia Tech	Atlantic Coast	4,000	1989	
	David F. Couch Ballpark	Winston-Salem	NC	Wake Forest	Atlantic Coast	3,823	1956	
	T. Henry Wilson Jr. Field	Davidson	NC	Davidson	Atlantic 10	700	1967	
	Woerner Field	Dayton	OH	Dayton	Atlantic 10	500	2004	
	Jim Houlihan Park at Jack Coffey Field	Bronx	NY	Fordham	Atlantic 10	1,000	2005	
	Spuhler Field	Fairfax	VA	George Mason	Atlantic 10	900	1986	
	Barcroft Park	Arlington	VA	George Washington	Atlantic 10	500	1993	
	Hank DeVincent Field	Philadelphia	PA	La Salle (Note: Resuming play in the 2026 season.)	Atlantic 10	1,000	1978	
	Bill Beck Field	Kingston	RI	Rhode Island	Atlantic 10	1,000	1966	
	Malcolm U. Pitt Field	Richmond	VA	Richmond	Atlantic 10	600	—N/a	
	Fred Handler Park	St. Bonaventure	NY	St. Bonaventure	Atlantic 10	500	1958	
	Smithson Field	Merion Station	PA	Saint Joseph's	Atlantic 10	400	2012	
	Billiken Sports Center	St. Louis	MO	Saint Louis	Atlantic 10	500	1990	
	Bulldog Park	Indianapolis	IN	Butler	Big East	500	—N/a	
	Charles Schwab Field Omaha	Omaha	NE	Creighton	Big East	24,505	2011	
	Capital One Park	Tysons	VA	Georgetown	Big East	650	2023	
	Mike Sheppard, Sr. Stadium at Owen T. Carroll Field	South Orange	NJ	Seton Hall	Big East	1,800	1907	
	Jack Kaiser Stadium	Queens	NY	St. John's	Big East	3,500	2000	
	Elliot Ballpark	Storrs	CT	UConn	Big East	1,500	2021 (Note: The stadium was completed in 2020 and was intended to open at that time, but the season was canceled in progress shortly before the scheduled opening.)	
	Villanova Ballpark at Plymouth	Plymouth Meeting	PA	Villanova	Big East	750	2003	
	J. Page Hayden Field	Cincinnati	OH	Xavier	Big East	500	1920s	
	CSU Ballpark	North Charleston	SC	Charleston Southern	Big South	1,500	—N/a	
	John Henry Moss Stadium	Boiling Springs	NC	Gardner-Webb	Big South	550	2010	
	George S. Erath Field at Coy O. Williard Baseball Stadium	High Point	NC	High Point	Big South	550	2007	
	Bolding Stadium	Farmville	VA	Longwood	Big South	500	1994	
	Presbyterian Baseball Complex	Clinton	SC	Presbyterian	Big South	500	1988	
	Carter Memorial Stadium	Radford	VA	Radford	Big South	700	1986	
	Greenwood Baseball Field	Asheville	NC	UNC Asheville	Big South	1,000	1988	
	Cleveland S. Harley Baseball Park	Spartanburg	SC	USC Upstate	Big South	500	2004	
	Winthrop Ballpark	Rock Hill	SC	Winthrop	Big South	1,800	2007	
	Illinois Field	Champaign	IL	Illinois	Big Ten	3,000	1988	
	Bart Kaufman Field	Bloomington	IN	Indiana	Big Ten	2,500	2013	
	Duane Banks Field	Iowa City	IA	Iowa	Big Ten	3,000	1974	
	Shipley Field	College Park	MD	Maryland	Big Ten	2,500	1965	
	Ray Fisher Stadium	Ann Arbor	MI	Michigan	Big Ten	4,000	1923	
	Drayton McLane Baseball Stadium at John H. Kobs Field	East Lansing	MI	Michigan State	Big Ten	4,600	1902	
	Siebert Field	Minneapolis	MN	Minnesota	Big Ten	1,500	1971	
	Haymarket Park	Lincoln	NE	Nebraska	Big Ten	8,500	2001	
	Rocky Miller Park	Evanston	IL	Northwestern	Big Ten	600	1943	
	Bill Davis Stadium	Columbus	OH	Ohio State	Big Ten	4,450	1997	
	PK Park	Eugene	OR	Oregon	Big Ten	4,000	2009	
	Medlar Field at Lubrano Park	University Park	PA	Penn State	Big Ten	5,406	2006	
	Alexander Field	West Lafayette	IN	Purdue	Big Ten	1,500	2013	
	Bainton Field	Piscataway	NJ	Rutgers	Big Ten	1,500	2007	
	Jackie Robinson Stadium	Los Angeles	CA	UCLA	Big Ten	1,820	1981	
	Dedeaux Field	Los Angeles	CA	USC	Big Ten	2,500	1974	
	Husky Ballpark	Seattle	WA	Washington	Big Ten	2,200	1998, renovated 2014	
	Phoenix Municipal Stadium	Phoenix	AZ	Arizona State	Big 12	8,775	1964	
	Hi Corbett Field	Tucson	AZ	Arizona	Big 12	9,500	1927	
	Baylor Ballpark	Waco	TX	Baylor	Big 12	5,000	1999	
	Larry H. Miller Field	Provo	UT	BYU	Big 12	2,710	2001	
	UC Baseball Stadium	Cincinnati	OH	Cincinnati	Big 12	3,085	2004	
	Schroeder Park	Houston	TX	Houston	Big 12	5,000	1995	
	Hoglund Ballpark	Lawrence	KS	Kansas	Big 12	2,500	1958	
	Tointon Family Stadium	Manhattan	KS	Kansas State	Big 12	2,331	1961	
	O'Brate Stadium	Stillwater	OK	Oklahoma State	Big 12	3,500	2021	
	Lupton Stadium	Fort Worth	TX	TCU	Big 12	4,500	2003	
	Dan Law Field at Rip Griffin Park	Lubbock	TX	Texas Tech	Big 12	4,432	1926, renovated 2012	
	John Euliano Park	Orlando (Note: The mailing address is Orlando, but the ballpark is in unincorporated Orange County.)	FL	UCF	Big 12	3,600	2001	
	America First Ballpark	Salt Lake City	UT	Utah	Big 12	3,000	2026	
	Kendrick Family Ballpark	Granville (Note: The mailing address is Morgantown.)	WV	West Virginia	Big 12	3,500	2015	
	Hardt Field	Bakersfield	CA	Bakersfield	Big West	900	2009	
	Robin Baggett Stadium	San Luis Obispo	CA	Cal Poly	Big West	3,138	2001	
	Goodwin Field	Fullerton	CA	Cal State Fullerton	Big West	3,500	1992	
	Matador Field	Northridge	CA	Cal State Northridge	Big West	1,200	1961	
	James W. Totman Stadium	Riverside	CA	California Baptist	Big West	800	2007	
	Blair Field	Long Beach	CA	Long Beach State	Big West	3,283	1958	
	John Smith Field	Sacramento	CA	Sacramento State	Big West	1,200	1953	
	Cicerone Field at Anteater Ballpark	Irvine	CA	UC Irvine	Big West	3,408	2002	
	Riverside Sports Complex	Riverside	CA	UC Riverside	Big West	2,500	—N/a	
	Caesar Uyesaka Stadium	Santa Barbara (Note: The mailing address is Santa Barbara, but the ballpark is in the adjacent community of Isla Vista.)	CA	UC Santa Barbara	Big West (WCC in 2028)	1,000	1964	
	Triton Ballpark	La Jolla	CA	UC San Diego	Big West (WCC in 2028)	500	—N/a	
	UCCU Ballpark	Orem	UT	Utah Valley	Big West	5,000	2005	
	Jim Perry Stadium	Buies Creek	NC	Campbell	Coastal Athletic	630	2013	
	CofC Baseball Stadium at Patriots Point	Mount Pleasant	SC	Charleston	Coastal Athletic	2,000	2001	
	Walter C. Latham Park	Elon	NC	Elon	Coastal Athletic	2,000	2001	
	University Field	Hempstead	NY	Hofstra	Coastal Athletic	400	2000	
	Monmouth Baseball Field	West Long Branch	NJ	Monmouth	Coastal Athletic	400	1984	
	World War Memorial Stadium	Greensboro	NC	North Carolina A&T	Coastal Athletic	7,500	1928	
	Parsons Field	Brookline	MA	Northeastern	Coastal Athletic	3,000	1933	
	Joe Nathan Field	Stony Brook	NY	Stony Brook	Coastal Athletic	1,000	1967, renovated 2011	
	John B. Schuerholz Baseball Complex	Towson	MD	Towson	Coastal Athletic	500	2001	
	Brooks Field	Wilmington	NC	UNC Wilmington	Coastal Athletic	3,000	1989	
	Plumeri Park	Williamsburg	VA	William & Mary	Coastal Athletic	1,000	1999	
	Bob Hannah Stadium	Newark	DE	Delaware	Conference USA	1,300	2000	
	FIU Baseball Stadium	Miami (Note: The mailing address is Miami, but the ballpark is in unincorporated Miami-Dade County.)	FL	FIU	Conference USA	2,000	1996	
	Rudy Abbott Field	Jacksonville	AL	Jacksonville State	Conference USA	1,500	1995	
	Fred Stillwell Stadium	Kennesaw (Note: The mailing address is Kennesaw, but the ballpark is in unincorporated Cobb County.)	GA	Kennesaw State	Conference USA	1,200	1984	
	Liberty Baseball Stadium	Lynchburg	VA	Liberty	Conference USA	2,500	2013	
	Reese Smith Jr. Field	Murfreesboro	TN	Middle Tennessee	Conference USA	2,600	1979	
	Hammons Field	Springfield	MO	Missouri State	Conference USA	7,986	2004	
	Presley Askew Field	Las Cruces	NM	New Mexico State	Conference USA	1,000	1982	
	Don Sanders Stadium	Huntsville	TX	Sam Houston	Conference USA	1,164	2006	
	Nick Denes Field	Bowling Green	KY	Western Kentucky	Conference USA	1,500	1968	
Wisconsin Franklin Field May 10, 2022 01	Franklin Field	Franklin	WI	Milwaukee	Horizon	4,000	2019	
	Ralph McKinzie Field	DeKalb	IL	Northern Illinois	Horizon	1,500	1965	
	Bill Aker Baseball Complex	Highland Heights	KY	Northern Kentucky	Horizon	500	2001	
	Oakland Baseball Field	Rochester (Note: The mailing address is Rochester, but the ballpark is in Rochester Hills.)	MI	Oakland	Horizon	500	—N/a	
	Nischwitz Stadium	Dayton (Note: The mailing address is Dayton, but the ballpark is in Fairborn.)	OH	Wright State	Horizon	750	1993 (Note: Wright State has played at this site since 1993, but the current stadium opened in 2000.)	
	7 17 Credit Union Field at Eastwood	Niles	OH	Youngstown State	Horizon	6,000	1999	
	Murray Stadium	Providence	RI	Brown	Ivy	1,000	1959	
	Robertson Field at Satow Stadium	New York	NY	Columbia	Ivy	360	1921	
	Booth Field	Ithaca	NY	Cornell	Ivy	500	2023	
	Red Rolfe Field at Biondi Park	Hanover	NH	Dartmouth	Ivy	2,000	2008 (@ pre-existing field)	
	Joseph J. O'Donnell Field	Allston	MA	Harvard	Ivy	1,600	1898	
	Meiklejohn Stadium	Philadelphia	PA	Penn	Ivy	850	1999	
	Bill Clarke Field	Princeton	NJ	Princeton	Ivy	850	1961	
	Bush Field	West Haven	CT	Yale	Ivy	6,200	1928	
	Demske Sports Complex	Buffalo	NY	Canisius	Metro	1,200	1989	
	Alumni Baseball Diamond	Fairfield	CT	Fairfield	Metro	1,000	2001	
	City Park	New Rochelle	NY	Iona	Metro	500	—N/a	
	Van Cortlandt Park	Bronx	NY	Manhattan	Metro	3,000	1888	
	James J. McCann Baseball Field	Poughkeepsie	NY	Marist	Metro	350	1992	
	Warrior Baseball Diamond/Greater Lawrence Technical High School Field	Andover	MA	Merrimack	Metro	500	1974	
	Straw Family Stadium	Emmitsburg (Note: The mailing address is Emmitsburg, but the ballpark is in unincorporated Frederick County.)	MD	Mount St. Mary's	Metro	500	2007	
	Bobo Field	Lewiston (Note: Mailing address is Niagara University.)	NY	Niagara	Metro	300	—N/a	
	Quinnipiac Baseball Field	Hamden	CT	Quinnipiac	Metro	320	—N/a	
	Sonny Pittaro Field	Lawrenceville	NJ	Rider	Metro	2,000	—N/a	
	Veterans Memorial Park	Bridgeport	CT	Sacred Heart	Metro	500	2009	
	Connors Park	Loudonville	NY	Siena	Metro	370	1950s	
	Joseph J. Jaroschak Field	Jersey City	NJ	Saint Peter's	Metro	500	1990	
	Skeeles Field	Akron	OH	Akron	Mid-American	1,500	1967	
	Ball Diamond	Muncie	IN	Ball State	Mid-American	1,700	—N/a	
	Steller Field	Bowling Green	OH	Bowling Green	Mid-American	2,500	1964	
	Bill Theunissen Stadium	Mount Pleasant	MI	Central Michigan	Mid-American	2,042	2002	
	Oestrike Stadium	Ypsilanti	MI	Eastern Michigan	Mid-American	2,500	1971	
	Olga Mural Field at Schoonover Stadium	Kent	OH	Kent State	Mid-American	1,148	2005	
	Earl Lorden Field	Amherst	MA	Massachusetts	Mid-American	1,000	1971	
	Stanley G. McKie Field at Joseph P. Hayden Jr. Park	Oxford	OH	Miami (Ohio)	Mid-American	1,000	2002	
	Bob Wren Stadium	Athens	OH	Ohio	Mid-American	4,000	1998	
	Scott Park Baseball Complex	Toledo	OH	Toledo	Mid-American	1,000	—N/a	
	Hyames Field	Kalamazoo	MI	Western Michigan	Mid-American	1,500	1939	
	E. S. Rose Park	Nashville	TN	Belmont	Missouri Valley	750	2011	
	Dozer Park	Peoria	IL	Bradley	Missouri Valley	8,500	2002, renovated 2023-2025	
	German American Bank Field at Charles H. Braun Stadium	Evansville	IN	Evansville	Missouri Valley	1,200+	—N/a	
Duffy Base Field ISU Baseball	Duffy Bass Field	Normal	IL	Illinois State	Missouri Valley	1,000+	1988, renovated 2008	
	Bob Warn Field at Sycamore Stadium	Terre Haute	IN	Indiana State	Missouri Valley	2,000	1978	
	Reagan Field	Murray	KY	Murray State	Missouri Valley	800	1989, renovated 2006	
	Itchy Jones Stadium	Carbondale	IL	Southern Illinois	Missouri Valley	2,000	1964, renovated 2011	
	Les Miller Field at Curtis Granderson Stadium	Chicago	IL	UIC	Missouri Valley	1,000	1996	
	Emory G. Bauer Field	Valparaiso	IN	Valparaiso	Missouri Valley	500	1970	
	Erdle Field	USAF Academy	CO	Air Force	Mountain West	1,000	1957	
	Brazell Field at GCU Ballpark	Phoenix	AZ	Grand Canyon	Mountain West	3,500	2018	
	Les Murakami Stadium	Honolulu	HI	Hawaii	Mountain West	4,312	1984	
	William Peccole Park	Reno	NV	Nevada	Mountain West	3,000	1988	
	Santa Ana Star Field	Albuquerque	NM	New Mexico	Mountain West	1,000	late 1960s	
	Excite Ballpark	San Jose	CA	San Jose State	Mountain West	4,200	1942	
	Earl Wilson Stadium	Paradise (Note: Mailing address is Las Vegas.)	NV	UNLV	Mountain West	2,500	1994	
	Dobbins Stadium	Davis	CA	UC Davis	Mountain West	3,500	1986	
	Bruce Hurst Field	St. George	UT	Utah Tech (Note: known as Dixie State University before 2022.)	Mountain West	2,500	1994	
	CCSU Baseball Field	New Britain	CT	Central Connecticut	NEC	500	2010	
	Joe Cannon Stadium	Hanover	MD	Coppin State	NEC	1,500	1990	
	Soldier Field	Dover	DE	Delaware State	NEC	500	1958	
	Naimoli Family Baseball Complex	Teaneck	NJ	Fairleigh Dickinson	NEC	500	2011	
	Dick Rockwell Field	Syracuse (Note: The mailing address is Syracuse, but the ballpark is in the adjacent town of DeWitt.)	NY	Le Moyne	NEC	300	—N/a	
	Frank Vieira Field	West Haven	CT	New Haven	NEC	500	1986	
	LIU Baseball Stadium	Brookville	NY	LIU	NEC	500	—N/a	
	Hawk Stadium	Princess Anne (Note: The mailing address is Princess Anne, but the ballpark is in unincorporated Somerset County.)	MD	Maryland Eastern Shore	NEC	1,000	2008	
	Mercyhurst Baseball Field	Erie	PA	Mercyhurst	NEC	1,000	2014	
	Marty L. Miller Field	Norfolk	VA	Norfolk State	NEC	1,500	1997	
	Lou Gorman Field	Easton	MA	Stonehill	NEC	500	2005	
	SIUH Community Park	Staten Island	NY	Wagner	NEC	7,171	2001	
	Coaches Stadium at Monier Field	Charleston	IL	Eastern Illinois	Ohio Valley	500	1982, renovated 2002	
	Lou Brock Sports Complex	St. Charles	MO	Lindenwood	Ohio Valley	700	2015	
	Allen Field	Morehead	KY	Morehead State	Ohio Valley	1,000	1973	
	Roy E. Lee Field at Simmons Baseball Complex	Edwardsville	IL	SIU Edwardsville	Ohio Valley	1,500	1972, renovated 2014	
	Capaha Field	Cape Girardeau	MO	Southeast Missouri State	Ohio Valley	2,000	Late 1920s/early 1930s, renovated 2006	
	USI Baseball Field	Evansville (Note: The mailing address is Evansville, but the ballpark is in unincorporated Vanderburgh County.)	IN	Southern Indiana	Ohio Valley	1,200	1974	
	Skyhawk Baseball Field	Martin	TN	UT Martin	Ohio Valley	500	1974	
	Alfred D. Boyer Stadium	Macomb	IL	Western Illinois	Ohio Valley	500	2006	
	Johnson Stadium at Doubleday Field	West Point	NY	Army	Patriot	880	1939	
	Horner Ballpark	Dallas	TX	Dallas Baptist	Pac-12	2,000	2013	
	Pete Beiden Field at Bob Bennett Stadium	Fresno	CA	Fresno State	Pac-12	5,757	1966	
	Washington Trust Field and Patterson Baseball Complex	Spokane	WA	Gonzaga	Pac-12	2,300	2007	
	Goss Stadium at Coleman Field	Corvallis	OR	Oregon State	Pac-12	3,248	1907	
	Tony Gwynn Stadium	San Diego	CA	San Diego State	Pac-12	3,000	1997	
	Bobcat Ballpark	San Marcos	TX	Texas State	Pac-12	2,500	2009	
	Bailey–Brayton Field	Pullman	WA	Washington State	Pac-12	3,500	1980	
	Eugene B. Depew Field	Lewisburg	PA	Bucknell	Patriot	500	1999	
	Hanover Insurance Park at Fitton Field	Worcester	MA	Holy Cross	Patriot	3,000	1905	
	Kamine Stadium	Forks Township	PA	Lafayette	Patriot	500	1960s	
	J. David Walker Field at Legacy Park	Bethlehem	PA	Lehigh	Patriot	370	2015	
	Terwilliger Brothers Field at Max Bishop Stadium	Annapolis	MD	Navy	Patriot	1,500	1962	
	Sewell–Thomas Stadium	Tuscaloosa	AL	Alabama	Southeastern	5,867	1948, closed 2015, rebuilt 2016	
	Baum–Walker Stadium	Fayetteville	AR	Arkansas	Southeastern	10,737	1996	
	Samford Stadium – Hitchcock Field at Plainsman Park	Auburn	AL	Auburn	Southeastern	4,403	1950, rebuilt 1996	
	Condron Ballpark	Gainesville	FL	Florida	Southeastern	7,000	2021	
	Foley Field	Athens	GA	Georgia	Southeastern	3,291	1966, renovated 2015	
	Kentucky Proud Park	Lexington	KY	Kentucky	Southeastern	5,000	2018	
	Alex Box Stadium, Skip Bertman Field	Baton Rouge	LA	LSU	Southeastern	10,718	2009	
	Swayze Field	University	MS	Ole Miss	Southeastern	11,477	1948, rebuilt 1989, renovated 2010, renovated 2018	
	Dudy Noble Field, Polk–DeMent Stadium	Mississippi State	MS	Mississippi State	Southeastern	15,000	1967, rebuilt 1987, renovated 2001, rebuilt 2019	
	Taylor Stadium	Columbia	MO	Missouri	Southeastern	3,031	2002	
	Kimrey Family Stadium	Norman	OK	Oklahoma	Southeastern	3,180	1982	
	Founders Park	Columbia	SC	South Carolina	Southeastern	6,600	2009	
	Lindsey Nelson Stadium	Knoxville	TN	Tennessee	Southeastern	8,012	1959, rebuilt 1993	
	UFCU Disch–Falk Field	Austin	TX	Texas	Southeastern	7,373	1975	
	Olsen Field at Blue Bell Park	College Station	TX	Texas A&M	Southeastern	6,100	1978, renovated 2014	
	Hawkins Field	Nashville	TN	Vanderbilt	Southeastern	3,626	2002	
	Joseph P. Riley Jr. Park	Charleston	SC	The Citadel	Southern	6,000	1997	
	Thomas Stadium	Johnson City	TN	East Tennessee State	Southern	1,000	2012	
	OrthoGeorgia Park	Macon	GA	Mercer	Southern	1,500	—N/a	
	Joe Lee Griffin Stadium	Homewood	AL	Samford	Southern	1,000	—N/a	
	Bush Stadium at Averitt Express Baseball Complex	Cookeville	TN	Tennessee Tech	SoCon	1,100	1978	
	UNCG Baseball Stadium	Greensboro	NC	UNC Greensboro	Southern	3,500	1999	
	Hennon Stadium	Cullowhee	NC	Western Carolina	Southern	1,500	1978	
	Gray–Minor Stadium	Lexington	VA	VMI	Southern	1,400	2007	
	Russell C. King Field	Spartanburg	SC	Wofford	Southern	2,500	2004	
	Husky Field	Houston	TX	Houston Christian	Southland	500	1993	
	Daniel Sullivan Field	San Antonio	TX	Incarnate Word	Southland	1,000	1989	
	Vincent–Beck Stadium	Beaumont	TX	Lamar	Southland	3,500	1969, renovated 2006	
	Joe Miller Ballpark	Lake Charles	LA	McNeese	Southland	2,000	1965	
	Maestri Field at Privateer Park	New Orleans	LA	New Orleans	Southland	2,900	1979, renovated 2013	
	Ben Meyer Diamond at Ray E. Didier Field	Thibodaux	LA	Nicholls	Southland	3,200	1960	
	H. Alvin Brown–C. C. Stroud Field	Natchitoches	LA	Northwestern State	Southland	1,200	1939	
	Pat Kenelly Diamond at Alumni Field	Hammond	LA	Southeastern Louisiana	Southland	2,500	1992	
	Jaycees Field	Nacogdoches	TX	Stephen F. Austin	Southland	1,000	2009	
	Chapman Field	Corpus Christi	TX	Texas A&M–Corpus Christi	Southland	750	2002, renovated 2012	
	UTRGV Baseball Stadium	Edinburg	TX	UTRGV	Southland	4,000	2001	
	Bulldog Field	Normal (Note: Mailing address is Huntsville.)	AL	Alabama A&M	SWAC	500	1997	
	Wheeler–Watkins Baseball Complex	Montgomery	AL	Alabama State	SWAC	500	2011	
	Foster Baseball Field at McGowan Stadium	Lorman (Note: The mailing address is Lorman, but the ballpark is in unincorporated Claiborne County.)	MS	Alcorn State	SWAC	500	2010	
	Torii Hunter Baseball Complex	Pine Bluff	AR	Arkansas–Pine Bluff	SWAC	1,000	2009-11	
	Jackie Robinson Ballpark	Daytona	FL	Bethune–Cookman	SWAC	4,200	1914	
	Moore–Kittles Field	Tallahassee	FL	Florida A&M	SWAC	500	1983	
	Wilbert Ellis Field at Ralph Waldo Emerson Jones Park	Grambling	LA	Grambling	SWAC	1,100	2002	
	Braddy Field	Jackson	MS	Jackson State	SWAC	800	2006	
	Magnolia Field	Itta Bena (Note: The mailing address is Itta Bena, but the ballpark is in unincorporated Leflore County.)	MS	Mississippi Valley State	SWAC	120	1950	
	John W. Tankersley Field	Prairie View	TX	Prairie View A&M	SWAC	512	—N/a	
	Lee–Hines Stadium	Baton Rouge	LA	Southern	SWAC	1,500	1992	
	MacGregor Park	Houston	TX	Texas Southern	SWAC	500	—N/a	
	Newman Outdoor Field	Fargo	ND	North Dakota State	Summit	4,513	1996	
	Jackson Field	Greeley	CO	Northern Colorado	Summit	1,500	1928	
	Tal Anderson Field	Omaha	NE	Omaha	Summit	1,500	2021	
	Chapman Park	Tulsa	OK	Oral Roberts	Summit	2,418	1977	
	Koch Diamond	St. Paul	MN	St. Thomas	Summit	250	2006	
	Erv Huether Field	Brookings	SD	South Dakota State	Summit	600	2008	
	Beaver Field at Jim and Bettie Smith Stadium	Boone	NC	Appalachian State	Sun Belt	1,000	2007	
	Tomlinson Stadium–Kell Field	Jonesboro	AR	Arkansas State	Sun Belt	1,200	1992	
	Springs Brooks Stadium	Conway	SC	Coastal Carolina	Sun Belt	5,500	1930, renovated 2015	
	J. I. Clements Stadium	Statesboro	GA	Georgia Southern	Sun Belt	3,000	2005	
	New Georgia State Ballpark	Atlanta	GA	Georgia State	Sun Belt	1,000	2026	
	Eagle Field at Veterans Memorial Park	Harrisonburg	VA	James Madison	Sun Belt	1,200	2010	
	M. L. Tigue Moore Field at Russo Park	Lafayette	LA	Louisiana	Sun Belt	6,015	1978, renovated 2017	
	Lou St. Amant Field	Monroe	LA	Louisiana–Monroe	Sun Belt	1,800	1983	
	J. C. Love Field at Pat Patterson Park	Ruston	LA	Louisiana Tech	Sun Belt	3,000	1971	
	Jack Cook Field	Huntington	WV	Marshall	Sun Belt	3,500	2024	
	Bud Metheny Ballpark	Norfolk	VA	Old Dominion	Sun Belt	2,500	1983	
	Eddie Stanky Field	Mobile	AL	South Alabama	Sun Belt	4,500	1980	
	Pete Taylor Park	Hattiesburg	MS	Southern Miss	Sun Belt	4,300	1985	
	Riddle–Pace Field	Troy	AL	Troy	Sun Belt	2,000	1931	
	Crutcher Scott Field	Abilene	TX	Abilene Christian	United Athletic	4,000	1991	
	Raymond C. Hand Park	Clarksville	TN	Austin Peay	United Athletic Conference	1,000+	1970, several renovations	
	Bear Stadium	Conway	AR	Central Arkansas	United Athletic Conference	1,000	2009	
	Turkey Hughes Field	Richmond	KY	Eastern Kentucky	United Athletic Conference	500	1960s, renovated 2009	
	Gary Hogan Field	Little Rock	AR	Little Rock	United Athletic Conference	2,550	1978	
	Mike D. Lane Field at Bank Independent Stadium	Florence	AL	North Alabama	United Athletic Conference	1,500	2025	
	Cecil Ballow Baseball Complex	Stephenville	TX	Tarleton	United Athletic	750	1988	
	Clay Gould Ballpark	Arlington	TX	UT Arlington	United Athletic	1,600	1974	
	Cole Field	Carrollton	GA	West Georgia	United Athletic Conference	500	1967	
	George C. Page Stadium	Los Angeles	CA	Loyola Marymount	West Coast	1,200	1983	
	Klein Family Field	Stockton	CA	Pacific	West Coast	2,500	2006	
	Eddy D. Field Stadium	Malibu (Note: The mailing address is Malibu, but the ballpark is in unincorporated Los Angeles County.)	CA	Pepperdine	West Coast	2,000	1973	
	Joe Etzel Field	Portland	OR	Portland	West Coast	1,000	1988	
	Louis Guisto Field	Moraga	CA	Saint Mary's	West Coast	1,100	2012	
	Fowler Park and Cunningham Field	San Diego	CA	San Diego	West Coast	1,700	2013	
	Dante Benedetti Diamond at Max Ulrich Field	San Francisco	CA	San Francisco	West Coast	2,000	1953	
	Stephen Schott Stadium	Santa Clara	CA	Santa Clara	West Coast	1,500	2005	
	Bannerwood Park	Bellevue	WA	Seattle	West Coast	300	—N/a	

== Additional stadiums ==
Off-campus stadium

Image	Stadium	City	State	Team	Conference	Capacity	Opened
	Charles Schwab Field	Omaha	NE	Men's College World Series	NCAA	24,505	2011
	Gold Mine on Airline	Metairie	LA	Tulane	American	10,000	1997
	Durham Bulls Athletic Park	Durham	NC	Duke	Atlantic Coast	10,000	1995
	McCormick Field	Asheville	NC	UNC Asheville	Big South	4,000	1924
	Jackson Field	Lansing	MI	Michigan State	Big Ten	7,527	1996
	Target Field	Minneapolis	MN	Minnesota	Big Ten	39,504	2010
	American Family Field	Milwaukee	WI	Milwaukee	Horizon League	41,900	2001
	Isotopes Park	Albuquerque	NM	New Mexico	Mountain West	11,124	2003
	Whataburger Field	Corpus Christi	TX	Texas A&M-Corpus Christi	Southland	5,400	2005
	Werner Park	Papillion	NE	Omaha	Summit	9,023	2011

== Future stadiums ==
This list is intended to include the following:

- Stadiums being built by current Division I members.
- Existing facilities of schools that have announced the addition of baseball or a transition to NCAA Division I.

Conference alignments reflect those expected to be in place at the stadium's opening or the school's entry into Division I play, as applicable. Years of joining a conference reflect baseball seasons, which take place in the calendar year after a school actually joins a conference.

Image	Stadium	City	State	Team	Conference	Capacity	Opened/opening
