= Soldier Field (disambiguation) =

Soldier Field is a multi-purpose stadium in Chicago which opened in 1924.

Soldier Field, Soldier's Field, or Soldiers Field may also refer to:

- Soldier Field (Washington State University), the 1892–1901 name of Rogers Field
- Joseph J. O'Donnell Field, formerly known as Soldier's Field, Harvard University's home baseball venue in Boston, Massachusetts
- Soldiers Field Soccer Stadium, original name of Jordan Field of Harvard University
- Soldier Field (Dover, Delaware), a baseball stadium on the campus of Delaware State University
- Soldier Field, a 2,000 capacity soccer stadium on the campus of Rogers State University

== See also ==
- Soldiers Field Road, a crosstown parkway in Boston, Massachusetts
