= Chris Pfatenhauer =

American baseball coach and catcher

Current position
- Title: Head coach
- Team: Utah Tech
- Conference: Mountain West
- Record: 351–305–1

Biographical details
- Born: 52–53
- Education: University of Nevada at Las Vegas

Playing career
- 1993–1994: College of the Canyons
- 1995: Wyoming
- Position: Catcher

Coaching career (HC unless noted)
- 1997: Glendale CC (Asst)
- 1998: Treasure Valley CC (Asst)
- 1999: Southern Nevada CC (Asst)
- 2001–2004: Faith Lutheran (NV) HS
- 2005: College of the Ozarks (Asst)
- 2006–2007: College of the Ozarks
- 2008–2009: Chico State (INF)
- 2010–2012: Nevada (INF/RC)
- 2013–present: Utah Tech

Head coaching record
- Overall: 351–305–1 (NCAA) 52–59 (NAIA)
- Tournaments: NCAA DI: 0–0; NCAA DII: 6–10

Accomplishments and honors

Championships
- 2× PacWest (2014, 2015)

Awards
- 2× PacWest Coach of the Year (2014, 2015)

Christopher Richard Pfatenhauer is an American baseball coach and former catcher. He is the head baseball coach of the Utah Tech Trailblazers formerly called Dixie State. He played college baseball at the College of the Canyons in 1993 and 1994 before transferring and playing for the Wyoming Cowboys in 1995. He graduated from the University of Nevada at Las Vegas. He also served as the head coach of the College of the Ozarks Bobcats (2006–2007)

== Playing career ==
Pfatenhauer attended Bonanza High School in Las Vegas, Nevada. As a member of the baseball team, Pfatenhauer was named the Southern Nevada High School Baseball Player of the Year as a senior in 1992. Following high school, Pfatenhauer enrolled at the College of the Canyons. Following his graduation from the College of the Canyons, Pfatenhauer continued his baseball career for the Wyoming.

== Coaching career ==
Pfatenhauer was named the head coach of the Faith Lutheran Crusaders in 2000, leading them to a state championship in 2003.

Pfatenhauer was named an assistant coach for the Nevada Wolf Pack in 2009.

On August 18, 2012, Pfatenhauer was named the head baseball coach at Dixie State University, now called Utah Tech University.

== Head coaching record ==
Record table
Season	Team	Overall	Conference	Standing	Postseason
College of the Ozarks Bobcats (Midlands Collegiate Athletic Conference) (2006–2007)
2006	College of the Ozarks	26–28	13–15		
2007	College of the Ozarks	26–31	6–12		
College of the Ozarks (NAIA):		52–59	19–27		
Dixie State Trailblazers^{(Red Storm '13-'16)} (Pacific West Conference) (2013–2018)
2013	Dixie State	32–17	23–13		NCAA Regional
2014	Dixie State	36–17	26–6	1st	NCAA West Regional
2015	Dixie State	32–19	24–8	1st	NCAA West Regional
2016	Dixie State	40–14	26–10	2nd	NCAA West Regional
2017	Dixie State	39–14–1	26–9–1	2nd	NCAA West Regional
2018	Dixie State	25–25	21–19	T-4th	
Dixie State:			146–65–1		
Dixie State Trailblazers (Rocky Mountain Athletic Conference) (2019–2020)
2019	Dixie State	35–19	23–13	3rd	RMAC Tournament
2020	Dixie State	15–3	4–0		Season canceled due to COVID-19
Dixie State:			27–13		
Utah Tech^{(Dixie State)} Trailblazers (Western Athletic Conference) (2021–present)
2021	Dixie State	24–32	21–15	4th	ineligible
2022	Dixie State	22–33	14–16	4th (West)	
2023	Utah Tech	13–39	8–22	13th	
2024	Utah Tech	14–42	10–20	10th	
2025	Utah Tech	24–31	9–15	8th	
Dixie State:		351–305–1	64–88		
Total:		351–305–1			
National champion Postseason invitational champion Conference regular season champion Conference regular season and conference tournament champion Division regular season champion Division regular season and conference tournament champion Conference tournament champion

== See also ==
- List of current NCAA Division I baseball coaches
