= Tarleton State Texans =

Athletic teams representing Tarleton State University

- University: Tarleton State University
- Nickname: Texans
- NCAA: Division I
- Conference: UAC (primary); ASUN (beach volleyball)
- Athletic director: Steve Uryasz
- Location: Stephenville, Texas
- Varsity teams: 16
- Football stadium: Memorial Stadium
- Basketball arena: EECU Center
- Baseball stadium: Cecil Ballow Baseball Complex
- Softball stadium: Tarleton Softball Complex
- Colors: Purple and white
- Website: tarletonsports.com

The Tarleton State Texans (formerly the Tarleton State Texans and TexAnns), also known as the Tarleton Texans, are the athletic teams that represent Tarleton State University of Stephenville, Texas in NCAA Division I intercollegiate sports.

== History ==
Before Tarleton became a four-year institution in 1961, its teams were known as the "Plowboys". The Texans currently compete as members of the United Athletic Conference (UAC; known before July 2026 as the Western Athletic Conference, or WAC) for 13 of their 14 varsity sports. During the school's four-year transition to full D-I membership, set to end in July 2024, Tarleton has planned to add several sports, with women's soccer the first to be confirmed, eventually launching in 2022. Tarleton next added beach volleyball, a women-only sport at the NCAA level, in the 2024 season (2023–24 school year), competing as a single-sport member of Conference USA. Wrestling is another varsity sport addition as announced by the school in partnership with the NCWA and The Texas Collegiate Wrestling Foundation with aspirations of being the first NCAA Division I program in Texas.

Before joining the WAC in July 2020, Tarleton had been a member of the NCAA Division II Lone Star Conference (LSC). It had two separate stints in the LSC, first from 1968–69 to 1975–76, when the Texans competed in the NAIA, and then from 1994–95 to 2019–20. Tarleton was also a founding member of the Texas Intercollegiate Athletic Association (TIAA) in the 1976–77 school year and remained in that league until the 1990–91 school year. From 1991–92 to 1993–94, Tarleton played as an independent. The Texans began their transition to Division I upon joining the WAC. Tarleton's football program competes at the second level of D-I football, the Football Championship Subdivision (FCS); it played its first D-I season as an independent before the WAC reinstated football in fall 2021.

Shortly after the 2022 season, the WAC and the Atlantic Sun Conference (then officially known as the ASUN Conference), which had operated a football-only partnership in the 2021 and 2022 seasons, fully merged their football leagues, with Tarleton as one of the new league's nine initial members. The new league's permanent name of United Athletic Conference (UAC) was officially announced in April 2023.

In July 2026, the WAC rebranded as the UAC, absorbing the football-only version of the UAC. Tarleton remained in the newly expanded UAC through this transition.

== Women's nickname history ==
The first TSU women's varsity teams, introduced in 1968–69, played under the "Texans" nickname. However, due to female athletes' wish to play under a distinctive nickname, the school changed it the following school year, though a consistent spelling was not immediately adopted—"Texanns", "Tex-Anns", and "TexAnns" were used interchangeably until 1972–73, when "TexAnns" was officially settled on. During the 2018–19 school year, two players and a student manager in the women's basketball program started a campaign to change the women's nickname back to "Texans". After receiving buy-in from virtually all female athletes, plus much of the university community, TSU announced in January 2019 that women's teams would once again be known as "Texans" starting in 2019–20.

== Facilities and athletic teams ==
=== Sports sponsored ===
Men's sports	Women's sports
Baseball	Basketball
Basketball	Beach volleyball
Cross country	Cross country
Football	Golf
Track and field^{1}	Soccer
	Softball
	Tennis
	Track and field^{1}
	Volleyball
^{1} – includes both indoor and outdoor

=== Sports venues ===
Venue	Sport	Opened
Memorial Stadium	Football	1951
EECU Center	Basketball	2025
Cecil Ballow Baseball Complex	Baseball	1988
Tarleton Softball Complex	Softball	1996
Wisdom Volleyball Gym	Volleyball	1970 (Note: The volleyball venue is a separate space within the larger Wisdom Gymnasium. The overall facility also housed the basketball teams before the 2025 opening of EECU Center.)
Tarleton Soccer Complex	Soccer	2022 (Note: As soccer venue exclusively.)

== Gallery ==
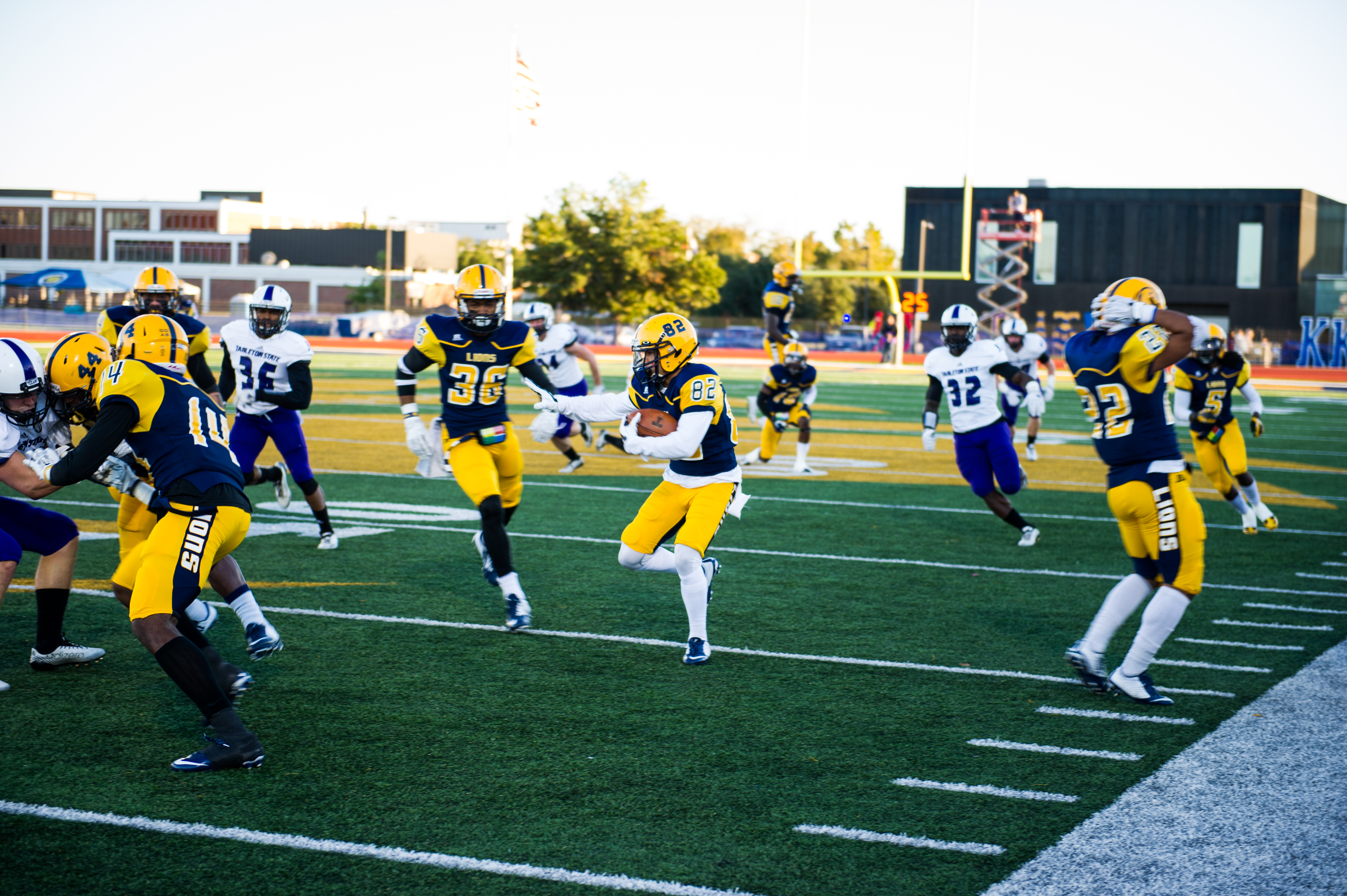
Football vs Texas A&M, 2014

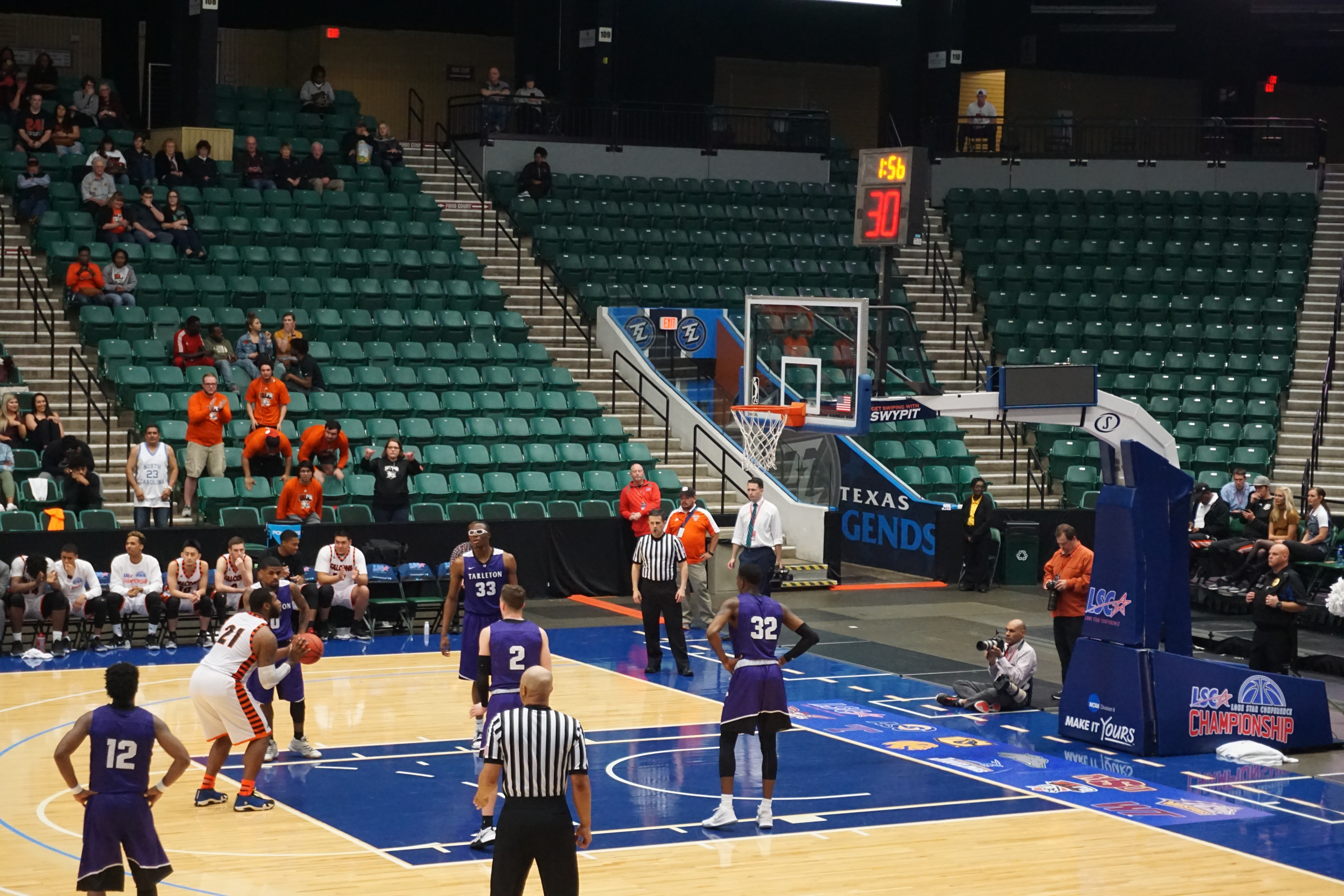
Men's basketball game, 2018

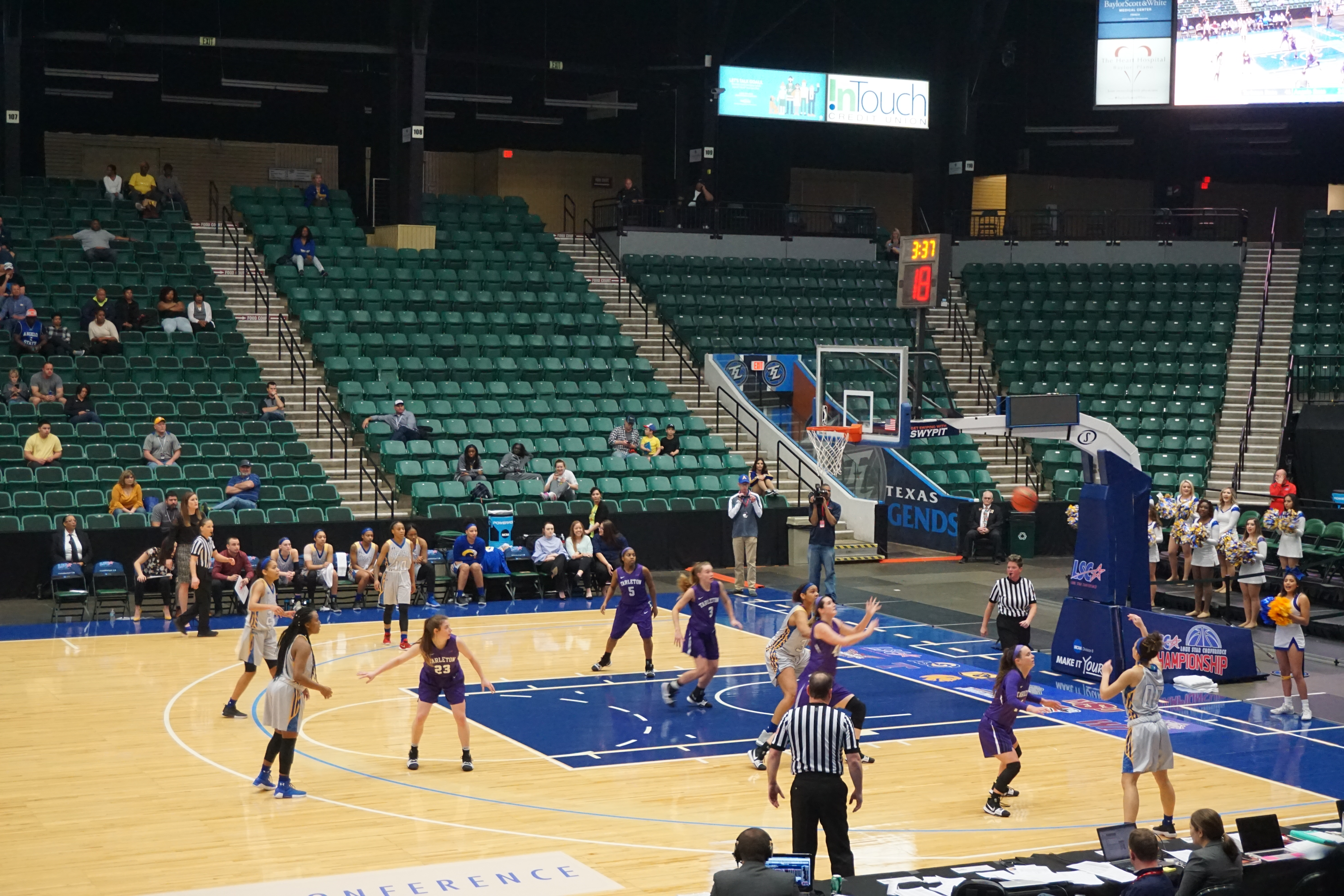
Women's basketball game, 2018

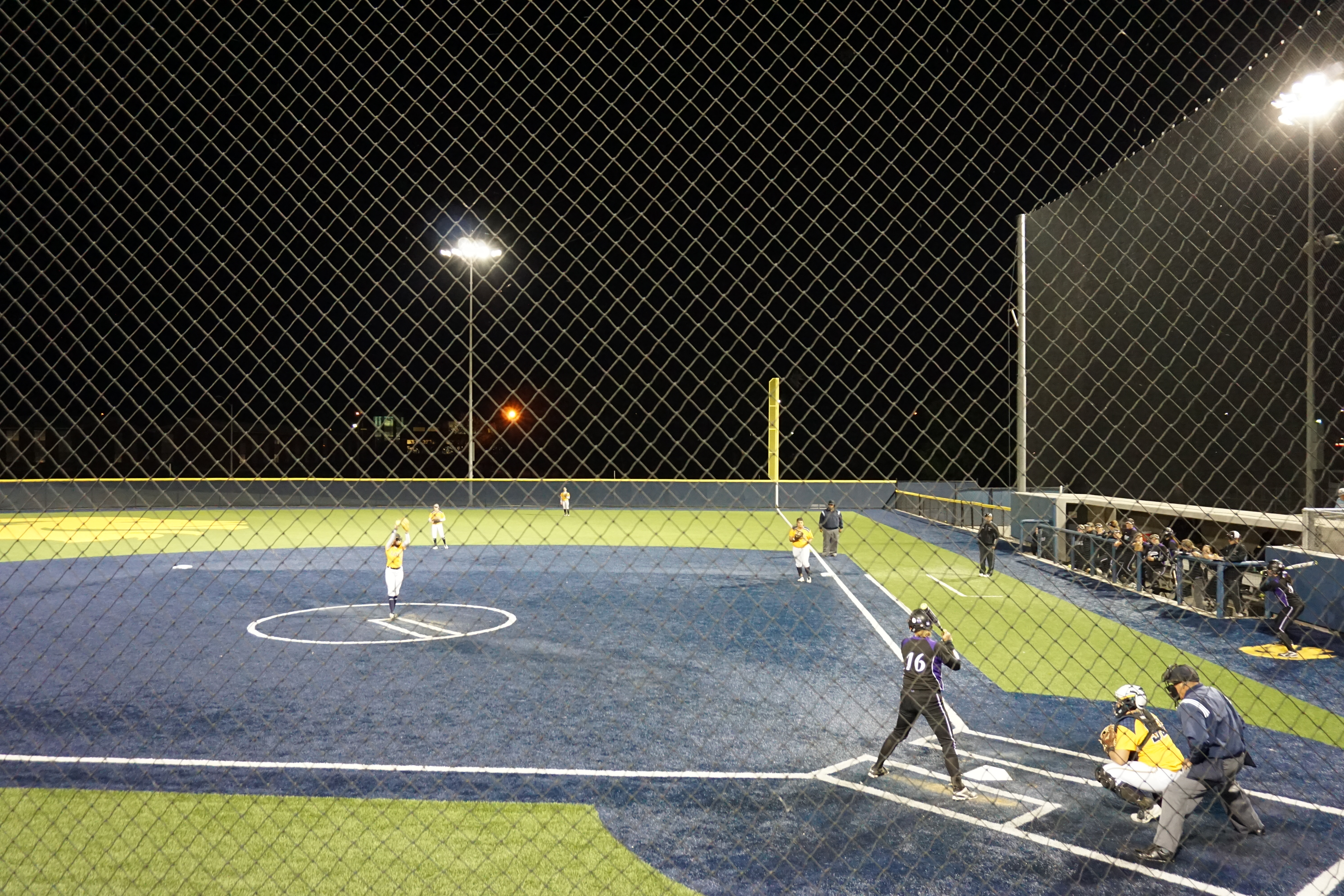
Softball game in 2016

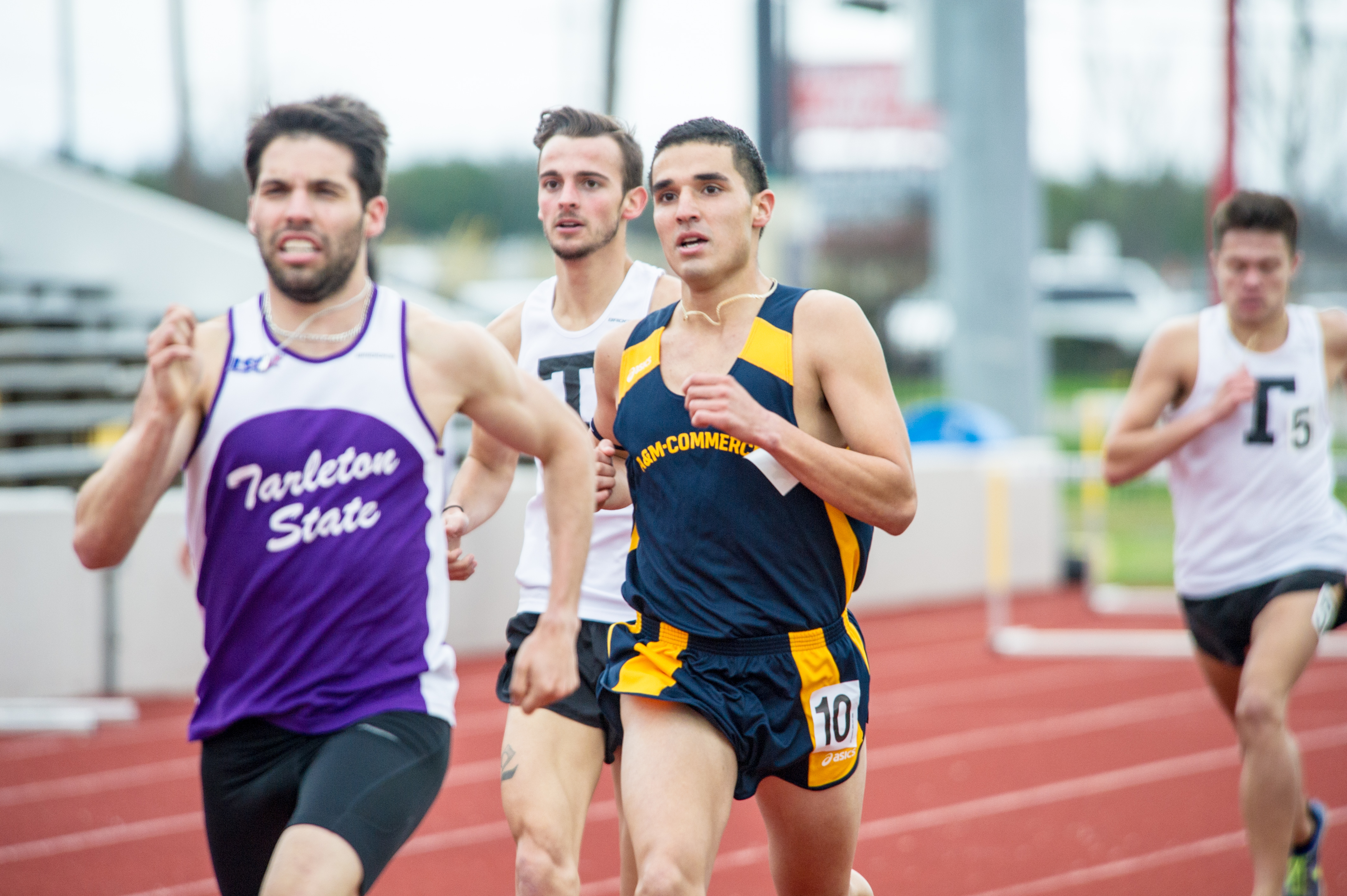
Men's track and field, 2015
