= James J. McCann Baseball Field =

Baseball stadium in Poughkeepsie, New York

- Interactive map of James J. McCann Baseball Field
- Location: Poughkeepsie, NY, United States
- Coordinates: 41.718431°N 73.934°W
- Owner: Marist College
- Operator: Marist College
- Capacity: 350
- Surface: Bluegrass, rye, and fescue mix
- Scoreboard: Electronic
- Field size: 337 ft. (LF); 377 ft. (LCF); 414 ft. (CF); 377 ft. (RCF); 330 ft. (RF)

Construction
- Built: 1991
- Opened: March 29, 1992
- Renovated: 2007

Tenant
- Marist Red Foxes baseball (1992–present)

James J. McCann Baseball Field is a baseball venue in Poughkeepsie, New York, United States. It is home to the Marist Red Foxes baseball team of the NCAA Division I Metro Atlantic Athletic Conference (MAAC). The facility has a seated capacity of 350 spectators. It opened in 1992. The field's namesake is James J. McCann, a Poughkeepsie native and supporter of Marist athletics.

== History ==
In the early 1990s, Marist trustee John J. Gartland Jr. and the McCann Foundation worked with Marist to raise funding for a baseball facility that would allow the school to compete at the Division I level. In 1991, after funding was raised, McCann Baseball Field was built. It hosted its first game on March 29, 1992, an 8–4 Marist win over Fairleigh Dickinson.

In 2005, the facility hosted the Empire State Games baseball tournament.

== Features ==
The field's seating is located behind home plate and along the third base line. In foul territory, the field features a four-foot fence, which was installed in 2007 and allows spectators to stand along the foul lines. The outfield fences varies in height from seven to nine feet. In center field, the fence lies 414 feet from home plate, the farthest center field fence in the MAAC. The field itself is a natural turf mixture of bluegrass, rye, and fescue. It grows in a sand base, which serves as a drainage system for the field. Around the field, the facility features batting cages, bullpens, locker rooms, and a training room.

== See also ==
- List of NCAA Division I baseball venues
