= Greenwood Baseball Field =

Baseball park at the University of North Carolina at Asheville

- Interactive map of Greenwood Baseball Field
- Location: Campus Drive, Asheville, North Carolina, USA
- Coordinates: 35.617253°N 82.570561°W
- Owner: University of North Carolina at Asheville
- Operator: University of North Carolina at Asheville
- Capacity: 1,000
- Surface: Natural grass
- Scoreboard: Electronic
- Field size: Left Field: 320 ft (98 m); Left-Center Field: 375 ft (114 m); Center Field: 390 ft (120 m); Right-Center Field: 375 ft (114 m); Right Field: 330 ft (100 m)

Construction
- Opened: Spring 1988

Tenant
- UNC Asheville Bulldogs baseball (Big South) (1988-present)

Website
- Greenwood Baseball Field

Greenwood Baseball Field is a baseball venue in Asheville, North Carolina, United States. It is home to the UNC Asheville Bulldogs baseball team of the NCAA Division I Big South Conference. The facility opened in 1988. It has a capacity of 1,000 spectators. It features an electronic scoreboard, dugouts, and a natural grass surface.

UNC Asheville also uses HomeTrust Park, home of the Asheville Tourists minor league baseball team, for a portion of its schedule.

== See also ==
- List of NCAA Division I baseball venues
