= Emory G. Bauer Field =

Baseball park in Valparaiso, Indiana, U.S.

- Interactive map of Emory G. Bauer Field
- Location: Warbler Drive, Valparaiso, Indiana, USA
- Coordinates: 41.460156°N 87.032683°W
- Owner: Valparaiso University
- Operator: Valparaiso University
- Capacity: 500
- Surface: Natural grass
- Scoreboard: Electronic

Construction
- Opened: 1970
- Renovated: 2001, 2008

Tenant
- Valparaiso Beacons baseball (MVC) (1970–present)

Emory G. Bauer Field is a baseball venue in Valparaiso, Indiana, United States. It is home to the Valparaiso Beacons baseball team of the NCAA Division I Missouri Valley Conference. Opened in 1970, it has a capacity of 500 spectators.

== Naming ==
The facility is named for former Valparaiso baseball coach Emory G. Bauer. In 28 season as head baseball coach, Bauer compiled a record of 361-245-2 (.595). He coached the Crusaders to 11 NCAA tournament appearances. Between 1946 and 1981, Bauer also served as Valparaiso's football coach, basketball coach, golf coach, physical education department chair, and athletic director.

== Renovations ==
Renovations beginning in 2001 made several improvement to the facility. A clubhouse, locker rooms, and indoor training facility were added adjacent to a new home dugout. In 2008, a new sound system and outfield fence were added, and the press box was renovated. In 2018, a weight room was added to the clubhouse facility, and prior to the 2021 season, synthetic turf was installed for the infield and foul lines.

== See also ==
- List of NCAA Division I baseball venues
