= Sonny Pittaro Field =

Baseball venue in New Jersey, US

- Pittaro Field
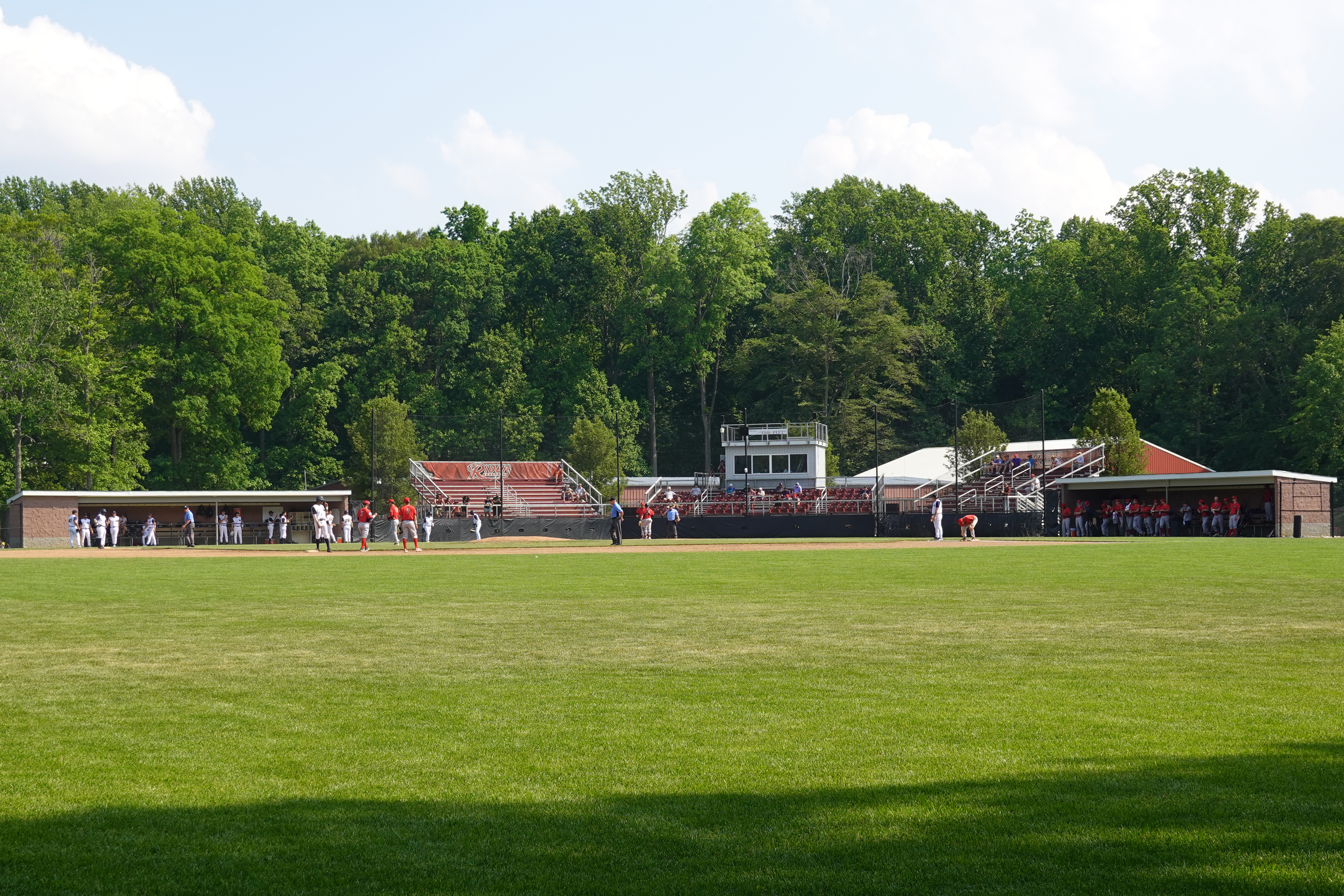
- A view of Sonny Pittaro Field from the outfield, showing its Dugout (baseball), bleachers, and press box.
- Interactive map of Sonny Pittaro Field
- Full name: Sonny Pittaro Baseball Field
- Location: 2083 Lawrenceville Road, Lawrenceville, NJ, U.S.
- Coordinates: 40.28207°N 74.746496°W
- Owner: Rider University
- Operator: Rider University
- Capacity: 2,000
- Scoreboard: Electronic
- Field size: 330 ft. (LF, RF), 405 ft. (CF)

Tenants
- Rider Broncs baseball (NCAA DI MAAC); Trenton Thunder (MLB Draft League) (2021)

Sonny Pittaro Field is a baseball venue located in Lawrenceville, New Jersey, United States. It is home to the Rider University Broncs college baseball team of the Division I Metro Atlantic Athletic Conference. The facility has a capacity of 2,000 spectators.

The field is named for former Rider baseball coach Sonny Pittaro. Pittaro coached the Broncs for 34 years, winning 9 conference titles and appearing in the NCAA tournament 8 times.

Pittaro Field features stadium seating, a press box, and an irrigation system.

== See also ==
- List of NCAA Division I baseball venues
