= Connors Park =

Baseball venue in Loudonville, New York, US

- Interactive map of Connors Park
- Location: Friars Drive west of Maloy Circle, Loudonville, New York, USA
- Coordinates: 42.718997°N 73.749515°W
- Owner: Siena College
- Operator: Siena College
- Capacity: 370
- Surface: Natural grass
- Scoreboard: Electronic
- Field size: Left field: 330 feet (100 m); Left center field: 380 feet (120 m); Center field: 400 feet (120 m); Right center field: 380 feet (120 m); Right field: 310 feet (94 m)

Construction
- Opened: 1950s
- Renovated: 2015

Tenants
- Siena Saints baseball (MAAC) (1950s–present); Liberty League Baseball Tournament (2013)

Connors Park is a baseball venue in Loudonville, New York, United States. It is home to the Siena Saints baseball team of the NCAA Division I Metro Atlantic Athletic Conference. The field has been home to Siena's baseball program since its inception in the 1950s. It seats 500 spectators. Features include chairback seating, a team clubhouse, and brick dugouts. Plassman Hall, a Siena dormitory, is visible beyond the center field fence, while J. Spencer and Patricia Standish Library stands beyond the right field fence.

== Renovations ==
On June 1, 2015, it was announced that the Siena Baseball Field would receive major upgrades scheduled to be finished by Fall 2015. The $500,000 renovations would cover outfield irrigation, new seating systems with stadium backed seating, and a new press box with filming platforms.

== Events ==
The field hosted the 2013 Liberty League Baseball Tournament, won by RPI.

== See also ==
- List of NCAA Division I baseball venues
