= Ralph McKinzie Field =

Baseball venue in DeKalb, Illinois, US

- The Ralph
- Interactive map of Ralph McKinzie Field
- Location: Stadium Drive, DeKalb, Illinois, US
- Coordinates: 41.935262°N 88.779938°W
- Owner: Northern Illinois University
- Operator: Northern Illinois University
- Capacity: 1,500
- Surface: Natural grass
- Scoreboard: Electronic
- Field size: 312 ft. (LF); 368 ft. (LCF); 395 ft. (CF); 368 ft. (RCF); 322 ft. (RF); 8 ft. (outfield fence)

Construction
- Built: 1965
- Opened: April 10, 1965
- Renovated: 1993, 1994, 2011, 2022

Tenant
- Northern Illinois Huskies (NCAA) (1965–present)

Ralph McKinzie Field is a baseball venue in DeKalb, Illinois, United States, on the campus of Northern Illinois University (NIU). It is home to the NIU Huskies baseball team of the National Collegiate Athletic Association (NCAA) Division I as a member of the Mid-American Conference (MAC). The field is named for Ralph McKinzie, former head coach of the program. Built in 1965, it has a capacity of 1,500 spectators.

== History ==
The field was constructed in 1965 and hosted its first game on April 10, 1965, in which NIU was defeated by Wisconsin 13–1. NIU won its first game at the venue on April 30, 1965, defeating Central Michigan 10–5.

On May 8, 1993, the field was dedicated to Ralph McKinzie, who coached the program in 1945 and 1949 from 1956. McKinzie led the program to Interstate Intercollegiate Athletic Conference (IIAC) titles in 1950 and 1951.

== Renovations ==
In 1993, a new press box and grandstand were installed. In 1994, new fencing was added. Prior to the 2011 season, the playing surface and bullpens were improved.

== Other uses ==
In addition to NIU baseball, the field has hosted high school baseball prospect camps.

== See also ==
- List of NCAA Division I baseball venues
