= Straw Family Stadium =

College baseball stadium in Maryland, U.S.

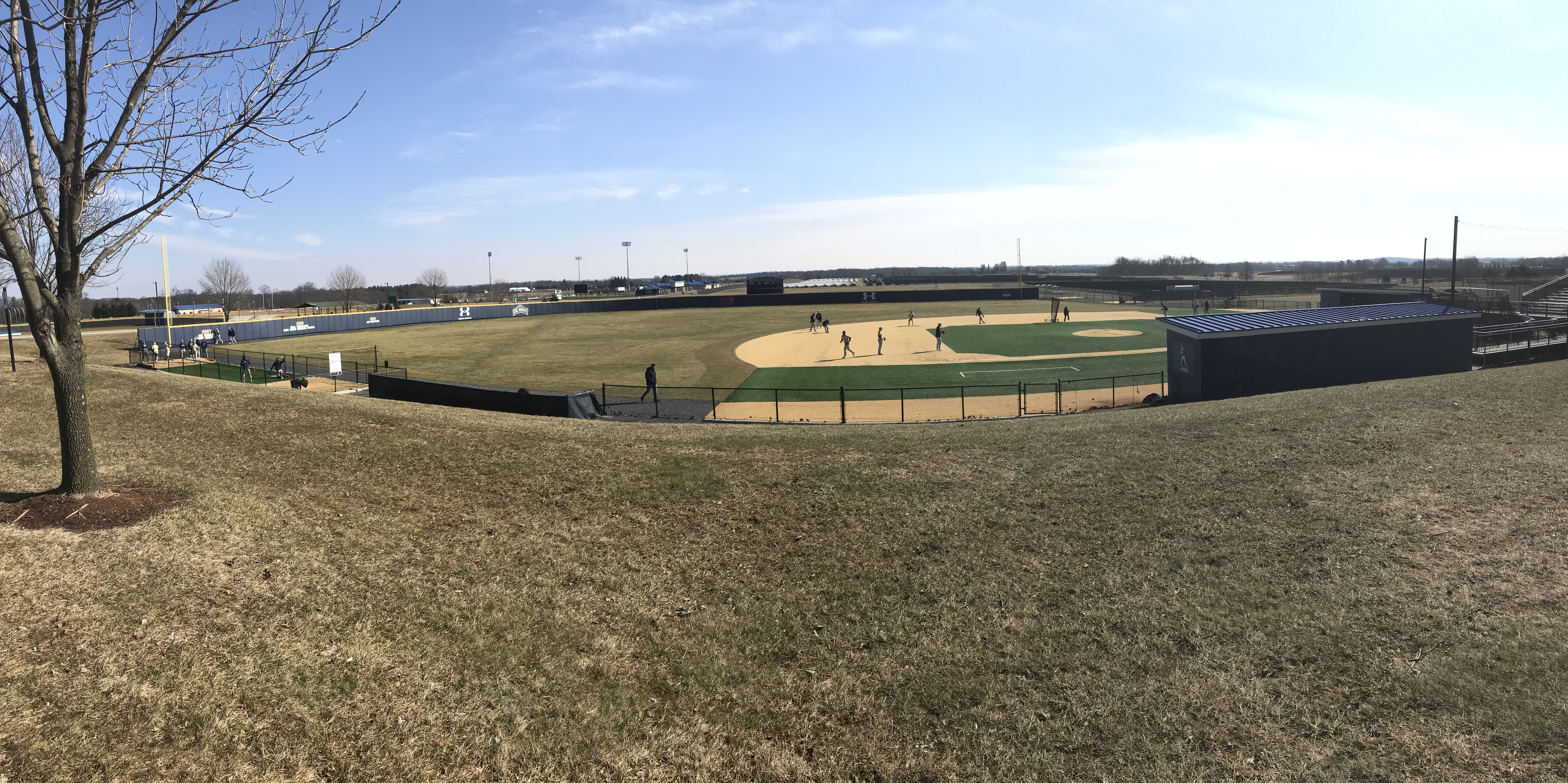
- Interactive map of Straw Family Stadium
- Full name: E. T. Straw Family Stadium
- Location: College Lane, Emmitsburg, Maryland, United States
- Coordinates: 39.678346°N 77.345526°W
- Owner: Mount St. Mary's University
- Operator: Mount St. Mary's University
- Surface: Natural grass
- Scoreboard: Electronic

Construction
- Renovated: 2007
- Cost: $400,000 (2007 renovations)

Tenant
- Mount St. Mary's Mountaineers baseball (NCAA DI MAAC)

E. T. Straw Family Stadium is a baseball venue in Emmitsburg, Maryland, United States. It is home to the Mount St. Mary's Mountaineers baseball team of the NCAA Division I Metro Atlantic Athletic Conference. The stadium is part of the larger PNC Sports Complex.

In 2007, the stadium underwent $400,000 renovations, thanks to the donation of Mount St. Mary's alumnus E.T. Straw. The venue was dedicated to Straw as a result. The renovations added a new backstop, outfield fence, a warning track, bullpens, and foul poles. A new press box, sound system, and bleachers were also added. A second round of renovations occurred in 2017, with the addition of a synthetic turf infield and padded outfield fences.

== See also ==
- List of NCAA Division I baseball venues
