= Bulldog Field =

Baseball park in Huntsville, Alabama

- Interactive map of Bulldog Field
- Location: North Memorial Parkway; Huntsville, AL 35810
- Coordinates: 34.780870°N 86.578778°W
- Operator: Alabama A&M University
- Capacity: 500
- Surface: Grass
- Field size: Left Field: 330 feet (100 m); Center Field: 402 feet (123 m); Right Field: 318 feet (97 m)

Construction
- Opened: 1997

Tenant
- Alabama A&M Bulldogs baseball (NCAA DI SWAC) (1997-present)

Bulldog Field is a 500-seat baseball park in Huntsville, Alabama. It is home to the Alabama A&M Bulldogs baseball team of the NCAA Division I Southwestern Athletic Conference. The venue has a capacity of 500 spectators.

== See also ==
- Alabama A&M Bulldogs baseball
