= Tarleton State Texans baseball =

Tarleton State Texans
- 2026 Tarleton State Texans baseball team
- University: Tarleton State University
- Head coach: Fuller Smith (3rd season)
- Conference: United Athletic Conference
- Location: Stephenville, Texas
- Home stadium: Cecil Ballow Baseball Complex (capacity: 550)
- Nickname: Texans
- Colors: Purple and white

NCAA tournament appearances
- Division II: 1998, 2011, 2014, 2018; Division I: 2026

Conference tournament champions
- LSC: 2014, 2018; WAC: 2024, 2026

Conference regular season champions
- TIAA: 1989, 1991, 1992; LSC South: 1999, 2000, 2003; LSC: 2013; WAC: 2026

The Tarleton State Texans baseball team is the varsity intercollegiate athletic team of the Tarleton State University in Stephenville, Texas, United States. The team competes in the National Collegiate Athletic Association's Division I and is a member of the United Athletic Conference. The Texans, although ineligible for the NCAA Division I Tournament due to transition rules, won the WAC baseball tournament in 2024.

== NCAA Tournament appearances ==
=== Division II ===
Tarleton State appeared in NCAA Division II baseball tournament four times. They had a record of 2–8.

| Year | Opponent | Result |
|---|---|---|
| 1998 | West Georgia; Texas A&M-Kingsville; Alabama Huntsville | L 0–5; W 10–8; L 6–14 |
| 2011 | Central Missouri; UIW | L 2–3; L 4–8 |
| 2014 | West Texas A&M; New Mexico Highlands; Texas A&M Kingsville | L 10–13; W 13–9 (10); L 6–8 |
| 2018 | West Texas A&M; Colorado Mesa | L 2–7; L 2–3 (11) |

=== Division I ===
Tarleton State has appeared in the NCAA Division I baseball tournament once.

| Year | Opponent | Result |
|---|---|---|
| 2026 | UC Santa Barbara; Texas | W 11–5, L 5–9; L 2–16 |
