= Presley Askew Field =

Baseball park at New Mexico State University

- Interactive map of Presley Askew Field
- Location: S Locust St and Wells St; Las Cruces, New Mexico, U.S.
- Coordinates: 32.27833°N 106.744484°W
- Owner: New Mexico State University
- Operator: New Mexico State University
- Capacity: 1,000
- Scoreboard: Electronic with video display
- Record attendance: 1,615 (February 27, 2015 vs Incarnate Word Cardinals)
- Field size: Left Field: 345 ft (105 m); Left-Center Field: 385 ft (117 m); Center Field: 400 ft (120 m); Right-Center Field: 385 ft (117 m); Right Field: 345 ft (105 m)

Construction
- Opened: November 14, 1981; 44 years ago
- Renovated: 1996, 1997, 1998, 1999, 2003, 2007, 2014
- Expanded: 2014
- Cost: 2014 Renovation, $1.4 Million

Tenant
- New Mexico State (NCAA) (1981–present)

Website
- Presley Askew Field

Presley Askew Field is a baseball venue located on the campus of New Mexico State University in Las Cruces, New Mexico. It is home to the New Mexico State Aggies baseball team, a member of the Division I Western Athletic Conference. The field is named after former Aggies baseball coach Presley Askew and has a capacity of 1,000 fans. Features of the field include a press box, public address system, bullpens and batting cages.

Going into the 2015 season, the New Mexico State Aggies have a 619–366–1 record in 31 years of play for a .628 winning percentage.

== Renovations ==
Numerous improvements have been made over the life of the stadium. In 1996, new grandstands, clubhouse and dugouts were added. Lights were added the next year and the stadium's first night game was held on February 21, 1997. A new fence was added prior to the 1998 season. Improvements continued in 1999 with a new press box, new restrooms, a sound system and a new scoreboard. In 2003, the dugouts were renovated and improvements to the playing field were made. Improvements in 2005 enhanced spectator viewing with backstop changes from chain to mesh. The scoreboard was replaced in 2007. A major improvement starting in May 2014 was made with the addition of chairback seating and an expansion of the south stands. Additional 2014 improvements included dugout renovation and expansion, upgrades to clubhouse lighting, sprinkler system repair, fencing upgrades, pressbox upgrades and upgrades to the scoreboard.

== See also ==
- List of NCAA Division I baseball venues
