= Utah Tech Trailblazers baseball =

Utah Tech Trailblazers
- 2026 Utah Tech Trailblazers baseball team
- Founded: 2007
- University: Utah Tech University
- Head coach: Chris Pfatenhauer (14th season)
- Conference: Mountain West Conference
- Location: St. George, Utah
- Home stadium: Bruce Hurst Field (capacity: 2,500)
- Nickname: Trailblazers
- Colors: Red, navy blue, and white

NCAA tournament appearances
- Division II: 2012, 2013, 2014, 2015, 2016, 2017

Conference tournament champions
- PacWest: 2009

Conference regular season champions
- PacWest: 2011, 2014, 2015

The Utah Tech Trailblazers baseball team represents Utah Tech University (Formerly known as Dixie State), which is located in St. George, Utah. The Trailblazers are an NCAA Division I college baseball program that competes in the Mountain West Conference. They competed in Division II from 2007 to 2020, playing ten seasons with the Pacific West Conference, and two with the Rocky Mountain Athletic Conference.

With Utah Tech leaving the WAC for the non-baseball Big Sky Conference in July 2026, the baseball team will become an affiliate of the Mountain West Conference.

The Utah Tech Trailblazers play all home games on campus at Bruce Hurst Field.

== Conference membership history (Division I only) ==
- 2021–present: Western Athletic Conference (played 2021-22 as Dixie State)
- 2027–future: Mountain West Conference

== Bruce Hurst Field ==
Bruce Hurst Field is a baseball stadium on the Utah Tech campus in St. George, Utah that seats 2,500 people. It opened in 1994 and has been the home of various other baseball teams and tournaments.

== Head coaches (Division I only) ==
Records taken from the Utah Tech Baseball Almanac .

| Season | Coach | Years | Record | Pct. |
|---|---|---|---|---|
| 2021–present | Chris Pfatenhauer | 4 | 73–146 | .333 |
| Totals | 1 coach | 4 seasons | 73–146 | .333 |

== Year-by-year NCAA Division I results ==
Records taken from the DSU Baseball Almanac.

Record table
| Season | Coach | Overall | Conference | Standing | Postseason |
|---|---|---|---|---|---|
Western Athletic Conference (2021–present)
| 2021 | Chris Pfatenhauer | 24–32 | 21–15 | 4th | ineligible |
| 2022 | Chris Pfatenhauer | 22-33 | 14-16 | 4th | ineligible |
| 2023 | Chris Pfatenhauer | 13-39 | 8-22 | 13th | ineligible |
| Total: | | 59–104 | Western Athletic Conference | | |
National champion Postseason invitational champion Conference regular season champion Conference regular season and conference tournament champion Division regular season champion Division regular season and conference tournament champion Conference tournament champion

== Awards and honors (Division I only) ==
=== Freshman All-Americans ===
| Year | Position | Name | Selector |
|---|---|---|---|
| 2021 | C | Kaden Hollow | CB |

Records taken from the DSU Baseball Almanac.

== Trailblazers in the Major Leagues ==
| = All-Star | = Baseball Hall of Famer |

| Athlete | Years in MLB | MLB teams |
|---|---|---|
| Brandon Kintzler | 2010-2021 | Milwaukee Brewers, Minnesota Twins, Washington Nationals, Chicago Cubs, Miami Marlins, Philadelphia Phillies |
| Brandon Lyon | 2001-2013 | Toronto Blue Jays, Boston Red Sox, Arizona Diamondbacks, Detroit Tigers, Houston Astros, New York Mets |
| Brad Thompson | 2005-2010 | St. Louis Cardinals, Kansas City Royals |

Taken from baseball-reference.com.

== See also ==
- List of NCAA Division I baseball programs
