= Soldier Field (Dover, Delaware) =

College baseball stadium in Delaware, US

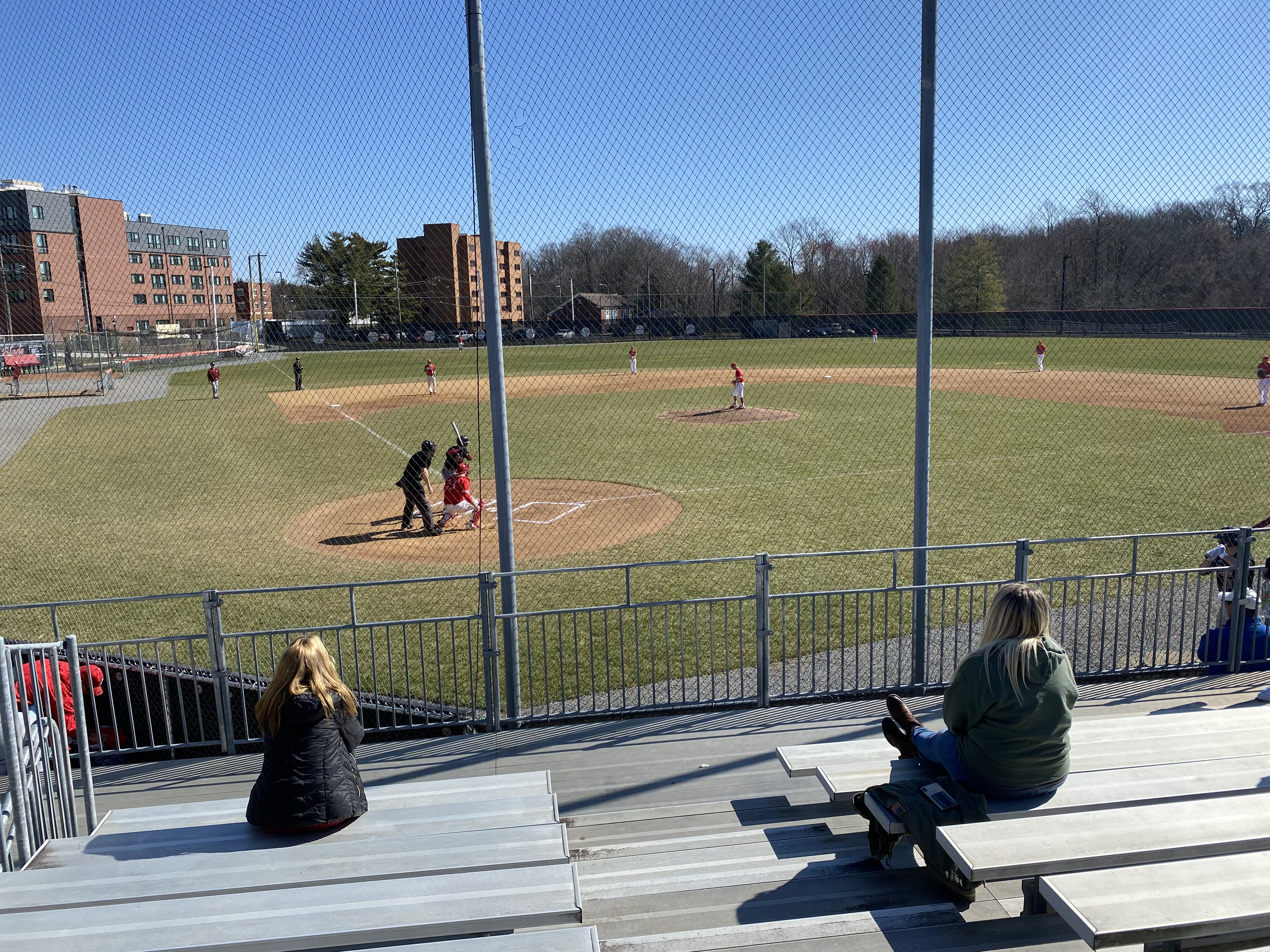
- Soldier Field in February 2020
- Interactive map of Soldier Field (Dover, Delaware)
- Location: 1200 N Dupont Hwy, Dover, DE 19901
- Coordinates: 39.1861413°N 75.5444675°W
- Capacity: 500

Tenant
- Delaware State Hornets baseball

Soldier Field is a college baseball stadium in Dover, Delaware. It is the home of the Delaware State Hornets baseball team. The stadium holds 500 fans and was built in 1958. Since 2009, it has undergone several renovations, including raising the height of the left field fence to 20 feet and adding two rows of chairback seats behind home plate. The stadium field is natural grass. Additionally, the paths from home plate to first and third base are grass rather than part of the dirt infield like at most parks.

The outfield fence dimensions are 320 feet down the foul lines and 380 feet to center.
