= Bruce Hurst Field =

Baseball stadium in St. George, Utah

Coordinates: 37°05′57″N 113°33′57″W

- Interactive map of Bruce Hurst Field
- Location: 800 E 600 S St. George, UT 84770
- Owner: Utah Tech University
- Operator: Utah Tech University
- Capacity: 2,500
- Surface: Hellas Matrix Turf
- Field size: Left Field: 325 ft (99 m); Left-Center Field: 370 ft (110 m); Center Field: 400 ft (120 m); Right-Center Field: 370 ft (110 m); Right Field: 325 ft (99 m)

Construction
- Opened: 1994

Tenants
- Utah Tech Trailblazers baseball (NCAA) (1994-present) St. George RoadRunners (GBL) (2007-2010) GBL All-Star Game (2009)

Website
- Bruce Herst Field

Bruce Hurst Field is a stadium in St. George, Utah. It is primarily used for baseball, hosting the Utah Tech University baseball team. It was formerly the home field of the St. George Roadrunners of the Golden league. It holds 2,500 people and was opened in 1994. As of 2013, Bruce Hurst Field also serves as the home field for at least one BYU Cougars home series, usually during the month of February or March. It is named after Bruce Hurst, a former major league baseball player who was born in St. George.
