= Cecil Ballow Baseball Complex =

Sports venue in Stephenville, Texas, US

- Interactive map of Cecil Ballow Baseball Complex
- Location: 101 S Harbin Dr; Stephenville, TX 76401
- Coordinates: 32°12′40″N 98°13′12″W
- Owner: Tarleton State University
- Operator: Tarleton State University
- Capacity: 1,000
- Surface: Hellas Matrix Turf
- Field size: Left Field: 320 ft (98 m); Left-Center Field: 365 ft (111 m); Center Field: 400 ft (120 m); Right-Center Field: 365 ft (111 m); Right Field: 320 ft (98 m)

Construction
- Opened: 1988

Tenant
- Tarleton State Texans baseball (NCAA) (1988-present)

Website
- Tarleton Baseball Complex

Cecil Ballow Baseball Complex is the home to the Tarleton State Texans baseball team in Stephenville, Texas. The field is natural grass, and seated capacity is 550. The stadium opened in 1988 just after completion.

== Reinstatement of baseball ==
The construction of the ballpark started in January 1987, a year before the baseball program was reinstated. It was officially named Cecil Ballow Baseball Complex in December 1987 in honor of Cecil Ballow, who was the school's former dean of students and pioneer in baseball where he also coached for 10 years.

== The field ==
The field has surrounding pecan trees in right and center field. The left field runs parallel to Washington Street with an extended net and a state-of-the-art scoreboard. The field dimensions are 320 feet down the foul lines, 365 feet to left-center and right-center field, and 400 feet to straightaway center.

The venue features red brick dugouts, a press box, outdoor batting tunnels, bullpens for both home team and visitor, an indoor batting cage and pitching area, indoor weight room, dressing area, and a practice field.

== Location ==
The field borders the Tarleton Horticultural Building which is on the south side of West Washington Street (Business 377).
