= List of Southwestern Athletic Conference baseball champions =

- Conference baseball championship
- Conference logo
- Sport: Baseball
- Conference: Southwestern Athletic Conference
- Played: 1921–1932, 1949–2019, 2021–Present
- Last contest: 2026
- Current champion: Alabama State
- Most championships: Southern, 34
- Winner trophy: Southwestern Athletic Conference Baseball Championship
- Official website: https://swac.org/sports/2020/10/21/BB_1021203009.aspx?path=baseball

This list of Southwestern Athletic Conference baseball champions concerns the overall conference baseball championship of the National Collegiate Athletic Association Division I Southwestern Athletic Conference. The top four finishers in each conference division participate in a two-bracket, double-elimination tournament to determine the overall conference champion; it was most recently played in Birmingham, Alabama. The winner of the tournament also receives an automatic berth to the NCAA tournament.

== History ==
=== Background ===
The SWAC was established in 1920, and the conference sponsored baseball as a league sport through the 1932 season, until around the uncertain times of the Great Depression and World War II before sanctioning it again in 1949 (the conference had actually considered dropping the sport even before that; even early SWAC power Wiley shut down its baseball program after the 1932 season, despite featuring a rising young star infielder from the Chicago area in Pat Patterson). Between 1959 and 2003, only Southern, Jackson State, and Grambling State won SWAC championships. The league office itself has even been known to refer to these schools as the "Big Three." However, since 2004, nine different programs have won championships, suggesting greater competitiveness in the league. Also, with the SWAC tournament now including eight schools, simply more lower-seeded teams have an opportunity to compete for the conference crown.

=== Determining conference champions ===
Early league championships were determined by regular season conference standings. By the fledgling conference's Fall 1923 business meeting, it was deemed feasible to purchase bronze shields produced by W. A. Holt company of Waco, Texas for the winners of that school years' football and baseball titles to display temporarily. Champions for three consecutive years would be allowed to keep the shield permanently—something that only Texas College was able to achieve during that era. For the first three seasons after the SWAC had renewed sponsorship of baseball in 1949, a championship series was held; the conference was divided into northern and southern divisions during that time period. The old bronze shield had also apparently been replaced with a tall trophy around then. In 1977 the league returned to division play—this time with eastern and western divisions instead (reflecting the geographic changes in conference membership)—with the two division winners again facing off in a best-of-three championship series. After the 1980 series featured a fourth consecutive JSU–SU match-up, the series was successfully converted into a more inclusive four-team, double-elimination tournament for the 1981 season, guaranteeing that at least one school that had never won the SWAC title before could compete in it (the four-team field was expanded to six teams in 2000 and eight teams in 2008).

=== Notable achievements ===
Southern has won 34 conference and 32 (Southern and Western) division crowns over the years; Roger Cador was the head coach for 14 of those overall championships. Texas College (1927–30), Southern (1952–55 and 1996–99), and Grambling State (1961–64) have each won four SWAC championships in a row (although Texas College was later forced to forfeit the last of theirs during that particular stretch).

=== Current status ===
A three-year deal was signed in 2020 to return the tournament to Smith–Wills Stadium in Jackson, Mississippi. However, just two weeks after that agreement was announced, the NCAA canceled all spring championship events for the 2020 season, due to the COVID-19 pandemic. Then, less than a month before the 2021 tournament, it was announced that it would be relocated from Jackson to Toyota Field in Madison, Alabama "due to enhanced COVID-19 protocols." Most recent tournament games have been played in Birmingham, home of the SWAC's administrative offices.

== Champions ==
=== Conference championships by year ===
The following is a list of conference champions, organized by year. The league office apparently does not acknowledge titles earned prior to 1959 in its public releases. It is not immediately clear if this is due to space constraints or poor record-keeping—or if the conference simply no longer considers pre-1959 titles as "official" for whatever reason. At that time the SWAC began to change significantly with a shift in membership from smaller, private Christian colleges in and around Texas—many of whom are now members of the National Association of Intercollegiate Athletics's HBCU Athletic Conference—to larger, secular public universities spread throughout the Deep South (Grambling and Jackson State were particularly notable additions, especially as far as baseball competition was concerned). Southern also won the NAIA World Series in 1959. The conference began changing demographically at that time as well, with southern universities beginning to integrate.

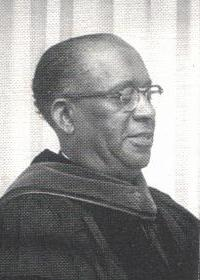
Ralph Waldo Emerson Jones, who led Grambling to multiple Southwestern Athletic Conference baseball championships. He also was inducted for achievements as a head coach into the National College Baseball Hall of Fame.

Year	Regular season champion(s)	Postseason champion(s)	Coach(es)
1921	**Bishop**		
1922			
1923			
1924	**Prairie View**		
1925	**Prairie View**; **Wiley**		Henry B. Hucles; Fred T. Long
1926	**Samuel Huston**		Robert Walter Johnson
1927	**Texas College**		
1928	**Texas College**		H. D. English
1929	**Texas College**		H. D. English
1930	~~Texas College~~ (forfeited)		~~Ace Mumford~~
1930	**Bishop**; **Wiley**		Fred T. Long
1931	**Wiley**		Fred T. Long
1932	**Texas College**		Ace Mumford
1933– 1948	(baseball no longer sanctioned as an official sport by the conference)		
1949	N: Arkansas AM&N; N: Bishop	**Bishop**	J. Forrest Kelley; Shannon B. Little
1949	S: Southern; S: Texas College	**Bishop**	J. Forrest Kelley; Shannon B. Little
1950	N: Bishop	**Southern**	Robert Henry "Bob" Lee
1950	S: Southern	**Southern**	Robert Henry "Bob" Lee
1951	N: Bishop	**Texas College**	Ernest Sterling
1951	S: Texas College	**Texas College**	Ernest Sterling
1952	**Southern**		Robert Henry "Bob" Lee
1953	**Southern**		Robert Henry "Bob" Lee
1954	**Southern**; **Wiley**		Robert Henry "Bob" Lee; J. Forrest Kelley
1955	**Southern**		Robert Henry "Bob" Lee
1956	**Wiley**		J. Forrest Kelley
1957	**Southern**		Robert Henry "Bob" Lee
1958	**Wiley**		J. Forrest Kelley
1959	**Southern**		Robert Henry "Bob" Lee
1960	**Southern**		Robert Henry "Bob" Lee
1961	**Grambling**		Ralph Waldo Emerson Jones
1962	**Grambling**		Ralph Waldo Emerson Jones
1963	**Grambling**		Ralph Waldo Emerson Jones
1964	**Grambling**		Ralph Waldo Emerson Jones
1965	**Southern**		Emory Hines
1966	**Southern**		Emory Hines
1967	**Grambling**		Ralph Waldo Emerson Jones
1968	**Jackson State**		Robert Hill
1969	**Southern**		Emory Hines
1970	**Southern**		Emory Hines
1971	**Jackson State**		W. C. Gorden
1972	**Southern**		Emory Hines
1973	**Jackson State**		Robert Braddy
1974	**Southern**		Emory Hines
1975	**Southern**		Emory Hines
1976	**Southern**		Emory Hines
1977	E: Jackson State	**Jackson State**	Robert Braddy
1977	W: Southern	**Jackson State**	Robert Braddy
1978	E: Jackson State	**Jackson State**	Robert Braddy
1978	W: Southern	**Jackson State**	Robert Braddy
1979	E: Jackson State	**Southern**	Leroy Boyd
1979	W: Southern	**Southern**	Leroy Boyd
1980	E: Jackson State	**Jackson State**	Robert Braddy
1980	W: Southern	**Jackson State**	Robert Braddy
1981	E: Alcorn State	**Southern**	Leroy Boyd
1981	W: Grambling State	**Southern**	Leroy Boyd
1982	E: Jackson State	**Jackson State**	Robert Braddy
1982	W: Southern	**Jackson State**	Robert Braddy
1983	E: Mississippi Valley State	**Grambling State**	Wilbert Ellis
1983	W: Grambling State	**Grambling State**	Wilbert Ellis
1984	E: Jackson State	**Grambling State**	Wilbert Ellis
1984	W: Southern	**Grambling State**	Wilbert Ellis
1985	E: Alcorn State	**Grambling State**	Wilbert Ellis
1985	W: Grambling State	**Grambling State**	Wilbert Ellis
1986	E: Jackson State	**Jackson State**	Robert Braddy
1986	W: Southern	**Jackson State**	Robert Braddy
1987	E: Jackson State	**Southern**	Roger Cador
1987	W: Southern	**Southern**	Roger Cador
1988	E: Alcorn State	**Southern**	Roger Cador
1988	W: Grambling State	**Southern**	Roger Cador
1989	E: Jackson State	**Jackson State**	Robert Braddy
1989	W: Grambling State	**Jackson State**	Robert Braddy
1990	E: Jackson State	**Jackson State**	Robert Braddy
1990	W: Southern	**Jackson State**	Robert Braddy
1991	E: Jackson State	**Southern**	Roger Cador
1991	W: Southern	**Southern**	Roger Cador
1992	E: Jackson State	**Southern**	Roger Cador
1992	W: Southern	**Southern**	Roger Cador
1993	E: Jackson State	**Jackson State**; **Southern**	Robert Braddy; Roger Cador
1993	W: Grambling State	**Jackson State**; **Southern**	Robert Braddy; Roger Cador
1994	E: Jackson State	**Jackson State**	Robert Braddy
1994	W: Southern	**Jackson State**	Robert Braddy
1995	E: Jackson State	**Jackson State**	Robert Braddy
1995	W: Southern	**Jackson State**	Robert Braddy
1996	E: Jackson State	**Southern**	Roger Cador
1996	W: Southern	**Southern**	Roger Cador
1997	E: Alcorn State	**Southern**	Roger Cador
1997	W: Southern	**Southern**	Roger Cador
1998	E: Jackson State	**Southern**	Roger Cador
1998	W: Southern	**Southern**	Roger Cador
1999	E: Jackson State	**Southern**	Roger Cador
1999	W: Southern	**Southern**	Roger Cador
2000	E: Jackson State	**Jackson State**	Robert Braddy
2000	W: Southern	**Jackson State**	Robert Braddy
2001	E: Alcorn State	**Southern**	Roger Cador
2001	W: Southern	**Southern**	Roger Cador
2002	E: Alcorn State	**Southern**	Roger Cador
2002	W: Southern	**Southern**	Roger Cador
2003	E: Mississippi Valley State	**Southern**	Roger Cador
2003	W: Southern	**Southern**	Roger Cador
2004	E: Mississippi Valley State	**Texas Southern**	Candy Robinson
2004	W: Southern	**Texas Southern**	Candy Robinson
2005	E: Mississippi Valley State	**Southern**	Roger Cador
2005	W: Southern; W: Texas Southern	**Southern**	Roger Cador
2006	E: ~~Jackson State~~ (forfeited); E: Mississippi Valley State	**Prairie View A&M**	Michael Robertson
2006	W: Prairie View A&M	**Prairie View A&M**	Michael Robertson
2007	E: Jackson State	**Prairie View A&M**	Michael Robertson
2007	W: Prairie View A&M	**Prairie View A&M**	Michael Robertson
2008	E: Jackson State	**Texas Southern**	Candy Robinson
2008	W: Southern	**Texas Southern**	Candy Robinson
2009	E: Mississippi Valley State	**Southern**	Roger Cador
2009	W: Southern	**Southern**	Roger Cador
2010	E: Jackson State	**Grambling State**	James Cooper
2010	W: Texas Southern	**Grambling State**	James Cooper
2011	E: Alcorn State	**Alcorn State**	Barrett Rey
2011	W: Southern	**Alcorn State**	Barrett Rey
2012	E: Jackson State	**Prairie View A&M**	Waskyla Cullivan
2012	W: Southern	**Prairie View A&M**	Waskyla Cullivan
2013	E: Jackson State	**Jackson State**	Omar Johnson
2013	W: Southern	**Jackson State**	Omar Johnson
2014	E: Alabama State	**Jackson State**	Omar Johnson
2014	W: Arkansas–Pine Bluff	**Jackson State**	Omar Johnson
2015	E: Alabama State	**Texas Southern**	Michael Robertson
2015	W: Arkansas–Pine Bluff	**Texas Southern**	Michael Robertson
2016	E: Alabama State	**Alabama State**	Mervyl Melendez
2016	W: Arkansas–Pine Bluff	**Alabama State**	Mervyl Melendez
2017	E: Jackson State	**Texas Southern**	Michael Robertson
2017	W: Grambling State	**Texas Southern**	Michael Robertson
2018	E: Alabama State	**Texas Southern**	Michael Robertson
2018	W: Texas Southern	**Texas Southern**	Michael Robertson
2019	E: Alabama State	**Southern**	Kerrick Jackson
2019	W: Southern	**Southern**	Kerrick Jackson
2020	(most of regular season and all of postseason canceled, due to COVID-19 pandemic)		
2021	E: Jackson State	**Southern**	Chris Crenshaw
2021	W: Prairie View A&M	**Southern**	Chris Crenshaw
2022	E: Alabama State	**Alabama State**	José Vázquez
2022	W: Southern	**Alabama State**	José Vázquez
2023	E: Alabama State	**Florida A&M**	Jamey Shouppe
2023	W: Grambling State	**Florida A&M**	Jamey Shouppe
2024	E: Florida A&M	**Grambling State**	Davin Pierre
2024	W: Texas Southern	**Grambling State**	Davin Pierre
2025	Bethune–Cookman	**Bethune–Cookman**	Jonathan Hernandez
2026	Bethune–Cookman	**Alabama State**	José Vázquez

Notes: overall conference champions are listed in boldface; in 1930, Texas College initially won the overall conference championship but, after forfeiting conference games for the use of an ineligible player, fell behind Bishop and Wiley in the retroactive final conference standings; in 1993, Jackson State and Southern were declared co-champions, due to weather forcing the cancellation of the SWAC baseball tournament final; in 2006, Jackson State initially clinched at least a share of the Eastern Division championship but, after forfeiting conference games for the use of ineligible players, fell behind Mississippi Valley State by the final division standings.

=== Conference championships by school ===
School	No. of titles	Year(s)
Southern	34	1950, 1952, 1953, 1954, 1955, 1957, 1959, 1960, 1965, 1966, 1969, 1970, 1972, 1974, 1975, 1976, 1979, 1981, 1987, 1988, 1991, 1992, 1993, 1996, 1997, 1998, 1999, 2001, 2002, 2003, 2005, 2009, 2019, 2021
Jackson State	16	1968, 1971, 1973, 1977, 1978, 1980, 1982, 1986, 1989, 1990, 1993, 1994, 1995, 2000, 2013, 2014
Grambling State	10	1961, 1962, 1963, 1964, 1967, 1983, 1984, 1985, 2010, 2024
Wiley	6	1925, 1930, 1931, 1954, 1956, 1958
Prairie View A&M	5	1924, 1925, 2006, 2007, 2012
Texas College	5	1927, 1928, 1929, ~~1930~~, 1932, 1951
Texas Southern	5	2004, 2008, 2015, 2017, 2018
Alabama State	3	2016, 2022, 2026
Bishop	3	1921, 1930, 1949
Alcorn State	1	2011
Bethune–Cookman	1	2025
Florida A&M	1	2023
Samuel Huston	1	1926

Note: in 1930, Texas College initially won the overall conference championship but, after forfeiting conference games for the use of an ineligible player, fell behind Bishop and Wiley in the retroactive final conference standings.

=== Regular season championships by school ===
Regular season conference standings determined the SWAC's overall champions from 1921 to 1932 and from 1952 to 1976 (all other seasons relied upon a split into divisions with postseason games deciding the SWAC's overall champions—except from 1933 to 1948 when the SWAC did not sanction baseball as a league sport). Since 2025, divisions have been discontinued, but the conference tournament still determines the overall champion. The teams below have won the regular season championship when it did not decide the overall champion.

School	No. of titles	Year(s)
Bethune–Cookman	2	2025, 2026

=== Eastern Division championships by school ===
School	No. of titles	Year(s)
Jackson State	26	1977, 1978, 1979, 1980, 1982, 1984, 1986, 1987, 1989, 1990, 1991, 1992, 1993, 1994, 1995, 1996, 1998, 1999, 2000, ~~2006~~, 2007, 2008, 2010, 2012, 2013, 2017, 2021
Alabama State	7	2014, 2015, 2016, 2018, 2019, 2022, 2023
Alcorn State	7	1981, 1985, 1988, 1997, 2001, 2002, 2011
Mississippi Valley State	6	1983, 2003, 2004, 2005, 2006, 2009
Florida A&M	1	2024

Note: in 2006, Jackson State initially clinched at least a share of the Eastern Division championship but, after forfeiting conference games for the use of ineligible players, fell behind Mississippi Valley State by the final division standings.

=== Western Division championships by school ===
School	No. of titles	Year(s)
Southern	30	1977, 1978, 1979, 1980, 1982, 1984, 1986, 1987, 1990, 1991, 1992, 1994, 1995, 1996, 1997, 1998, 1999, 2000, 2001, 2002, 2003, 2004, 2005, 2008, 2009, 2011, 2012, 2013, 2019, 2022
Grambling State	8	1981, 1983, 1985, 1988, 1989, 1993, 2017, 2023
Texas Southern	4	2005, 2010, 2018, 2024
Arkansas–Pine Bluff	3	2014, 2015, 2016
Prairie View A&M	3	2006, 2007, 2021

=== Northern Division championships by school ===
School	No. of titles	Year(s)
Bishop	3	1949, 1950, 1951
Arkansas–Pine Bluff	1	1949

=== Southern Division championships by school ===
School	No. of titles	Year(s)
Southern	2	1949, 1950
Texas College	2	1949, 1951

== See also ==
- Southwestern Athletic Conference baseball tournament
