= Southwestern Athletic Conference baseball tournament =

- Conference baseball championship
- Sport: Baseball
- Conference: Southwestern Athletic Conference
- Number of teams: 8
- Format: Two-bracket double-elimination with single elimination final
- Current stadium: Rickwood Field
- Current location: Birmingham, AL
- Played: 1949–1951, 1977–2019, 2021
- Last contest: 2026
- Current champion: Alabama State
- Most championships: Southern, 19
- TV partner(s): ESPN3 (ESPNews and ESPNU, in prior years)
- Official website: https://swac.org/feature/swacbaseball2021

Host stadiums
- Rickwood Field (2005, 2025–2026); Russ Chandler Stadium (2023–2024); Jerry D. Young Memorial Field (2022); Regions Field (2022); Toyota Field (2021); Wesley Barrow Stadium (2014–2019); LaGrave Field (2013); Lee–Hines Field (2003, 2008–2009, 2012); Fair Grounds Field (2001, 2010–2011); Pete Goldsby Field (1977, 1979, 2008); Smith–Wills Stadium (2000, 2007, ~~2020~~); Trustmark Park (2006); Baseball USA (2004); W. Peyton Shehee, Jr. Stadium (2002); Pilot Field (2002) "Rags" Scheuermann Field at Kirsch-Rooney Stadium (1996–1999); Chester Willis Field (1988–1995); Bringhurst Field (1986–1987); Neagle Field (1985); University Park (1978, 1980, 1982, 1984); Tiger Field (1981, 1983); Steer Stadium (1951); Fair Park Stadium (1949–1950)

Host locations
- Birmingham, AL (2005, 2022, 2025–2026); Atlanta, GA (2023–2024); Madison, AL (2021); New Orleans, LA (1996–1999, 2014–2019); Fort Worth, TX (2013); Baton Rouge, LA (1977, 1979, 2003, 2008–2009, 2012); Shreveport, LA (2001–2002, 2010–2011); Jackson, MS (1978, 1980, 1982, 1984, 2000, 2007, ~~2020~~); Pearl, MS (2006); Houston, TX (1985, 2004); Natchez, MS (1988–1995); Alexandria, LA (1986–1987); Grambling, LA (1981, 1983); Tyler, TX (1951); Marshall, TX (1949–1951)

The Southwestern Athletic Conference baseball tournament decides the conference baseball championship of the NCAA Division I Southwestern Athletic Conference. The top four finishers in each conference division participate in a two-bracket, double-elimination tournament, most recently played in Birmingham, Alabama. The winner of the tournament receives an automatic berth to the NCAA tournament.

== History ==
=== Background ===
The SWAC was established in 1920, and the conference is known to have sponsored baseball as a league sport until around the uncertain times of the Great Depression and World War II before sanctioning it again in 1949. Between 1959 and 2003, only Southern, Jackson State, and Grambling State won SWAC championships. The league office itself has even been known to refer to these schools as the "Big Three." However, since 2004, nine programs have won championships, suggesting greater competitiveness in the league. Also, with the SWAC tournament now including eight schools, simply more lower-seeded teams have an opportunity to compete for the conference crown. However, allowing lower-seeded teams to stake claim to the title and automatic bid to the NCAA tournament may have also come with a price; from 2000—when the SWAC tournament field expanded to six teams—to 2016, SWAC entrants went just 4–36 in NCAA regional play.

=== Origins of the modern tournament ===
Though the league championship was normally determined by the regular season conference standings, for a brief time after the SWAC renewed sponsorship of baseball in 1949, a championship series was held. The roots of the modern tournament began in 1977 when the league split into eastern and western divisions, with the division winners facing off in a best-of-three championship series; Jackson State and Southern met in that first series. A true tournament format was initially planned for the conclusion of the 1980 regular season, but SWAC officials were unable to assemble it in time—so another two-team championship series ended up being held in its place instead. After the 1980 series featured a fourth consecutive JSU–SU match-up, the series was successfully converted into a more inclusive four-team, double-elimination tournament for the 1981 season, guaranteeing that at least one school that had never won the SWAC title before could compete in it (the four-team field was expanded to six teams in 2000 and eight teams in 2008). That first tournament, held in Grambling, Louisiana, actually had the reverse effect though as it included division champions Grambling and Alcorn State—but then still gave division runners-up Southern and Jackson State yet another opportunity to win the title; indeed, Southern did win the rain-delayed tournament. Only Alcorn State's 1997 title game appearance prevented the Big Three from having a complete monopoly over the finals until 2003. However, between 2003 and 2019, every single title game had at least one non-Big Three team in it.

=== Host cities and venues ===
Initially, the earliest tournaments alternated between the home stadiums of the western and eastern division champions. Although the event had been played off-campus before (at Pete Goldsby Field, in Baton Rouge, Louisiana), it was played in a non-qualifier's hometown (Houston, home of Texas Southern) for the first time in 1985 and then moved to its first true neutral location for the 1986 edition—a rainy affair held at the old Bringhurst Field in Alexandria, Louisiana. But the tournament has not evolved without growing pains. It has changed locations numerous times over the years (including nine different stadiums for the eight tournaments played between 1999 and 2006). The tournament has not necessarily been easy for potential host cities to bid on, as the SWAC office has sometimes preferred bids that cover multiple sports facilities for an entire "SWAC Spring Sports Festival" encompassing all league-sponsored sports that have championship tournaments near the end of the spring semester. Also, promises made during these bidding processes have not necessarily always come to pass. For example, the 2004 championship game was supposed to be played at Minute Maid Park, a Major League Baseball stadium, but this was ultimately not pursued after Houston's bid was accepted.

=== Evolving tournament formats ===
The competition's changing format has also been questioned. In 2002 a weary columnist for the Baton Rouge Advocate lamented, "The SWAC Tournament has had a different venue and a different format each of the last four years. In that span, there have been times where both the site and the format were decided just weeks before the event." Indeed, multiple people associated with the Southern program over the years have expressed disappointment with format adjustments, hinting that it could be done to reduce odds of the Jaguars winning yet another tournament. One of the tournament's most vocal critics has been Roger Cador, who served as an assistant or head coach at Southern during most of the SWAC tournaments that have been held. In 2019 the league office responded by hiring Cador in an advisory role as staff liaison to "assist with marketing, promotions, and game management/event operations" for the tournament.

=== Notable games and superlatives ===
Texas College won Game 1 of the 1951 championship series over Bishop by the score of 26–4; Bishop won the next game, however, to force a deciding third game. Southern ultimately ended up advancing to the first twelve playoff and tournament championship games (1977–1988) and then reached another nine in a row between 1991 and 1999 (setting the league record for consecutive titles in the process, by winning four straight from 1996 to 1999). Besides the partial cancellation of the 1980 tournament, in 1993 the then-Natchez, Mississippi-based tournament was canceled by SWAC commissioner James Frank before the championship game could be played, due to the field's condition after enduring lightning and rain delays with only "makeshift tarps" available; the title game participants, Jackson State and Southern, were subsequently declared co-champions. This was not the first rain-plagued tournament held in Natchez, nor was it the last. In 1994 rain pushed Southern into playing three full nine-inning games on the day of the championship; the exhausted team ended up losing the finale by a mere one run. In 1995 the stadium was double-booked with Mississippi High School Activities Association playoff games during one of the days. In 2004 Texas Southern not only broke the Big Three's hold on the trophy but also set a title game scoring record in the process by winning 18–1. The 2005 tournament, which was held at historic Rickwood Field in Birmingham—then the new home of the SWAC offices—was suspended during the record 15th inning of the championship game due to stray gunfire generated from a gang fight that occurred on the street behind the center field wall; the teams and fans alike were forced to scramble for cover. Since then, the tournaments have been held relatively drama-free; however, even then rain delays at the 2008 event required the use of an additional facility in an attempt to stay on schedule with its new eight-team format. In 2021 JSU (which had finished 24–0 in league play and was also undefeated in the conference tournament) lost the title game to Southern 7–6 following a dramatic 3-run, ninth inning home run; the responding outfielder was unable to make a play on the ball after colliding with, and falling through, an unlocked bullpen gate.

=== Current status ===
A multi-year contract to hold the tournament at LaGrave Field in Fort Worth, Texas starting with the 2013 tourney was canceled after only one year due to the venue being in a state of disrepair. The event found a stable home after that at Wesley Barrow Stadium in New Orleans, which is associated with initiatives by the Major League Baseball Urban Youth Academy to promote increased participation by minorities in the sport—something that the SWAC has a vested interest in as a conference for historically black universities. In 2019 New Orleans served as a host city for the SWAC tournament for the tenth time—the most of any city (Natchez's Chester Willis Field is the venue that has hosted both the most tournaments overall and the most consecutive tournaments—eight between 1988 and 1995). A three-year deal was then signed in 2020 to return the tournament to Smith–Wills Stadium in Jackson, Mississippi. However, just two weeks after that agreement was announced, the NCAA canceled all spring championship events for the 2020 season, due to the COVID-19 pandemic. Then, less than a month before the 2021 tournament, it was announced that it would be relocated from Jackson to Toyota Field in Madison, Alabama "due to enhanced COVID–19 protocols." The 2022 tournament was relocated as well, to Birmingham.

== Champions ==
=== Conference tournament championships by year ===
The following is a list of conference tournament champions and tournament sites, organized by year. The tournament determined the conference's overall championship each year that it was played; in years that it was not held, conference standings generated through regular season play determined the overall champions. However, the league office apparently does not acknowledge titles earned prior to 1959 in its public releases. It is not immediately clear if this is due to space constraints or poor record-keeping—or if the conference simply does not consider pre-1959 titles as "official." At that time the SWAC began to change significantly with a shift in membership from smaller, private Christian colleges in and around Texas—many of whom are now members of the National Association of Intercollegiate Athletics's Red River Athletic Conference—to larger, secular public universities spread throughout the Deep South (Grambling and Jackson State were particularly notable additions, especially as far as baseball competition was concerned), and Southern also won the 1959 NAIA World Series. The conference also began to change demographically at that time as well, with southern universities beginning to integrate.

==== Championship series-era champions ====
Year	Champion	Coach(es)	Score	Runner-up	No. of teams	Venue(s)	Location(s)
1949	Bishop	Forrest Kelley	4–0	Southern	4	Fair Park Stadium	Marshall, TX
1949	Bishop	Shannon Little	4–0	Southern	4	Fair Park Stadium	Marshall, TX
1950	Southern	Bob Lee	7–3	Bishop	2	Fair Park Stadium	Marshall, TX
1951	Texas College	Ernest Sterling	10–6	Bishop	2	Steer Stadium	Tyler, TX
1951	Texas College	Ernest Sterling	10–6	Bishop	2	(unavailable)	Marshall, TX

Note: Bishop won the Northern Division outright in 1950 and 1951 but tied with Arkansas AM&N in 1949, facing them in a best-of-three series for the right to advance and play the Southern Division winner in a best-of-three series; Southern won the Southern Division outright in 1950, and Texas College won it outright in 1951 but tied with Southern in 1949, facing them in a playoff for the right to advance and play the Northern Division winner.

==== Playoff-era champions ====
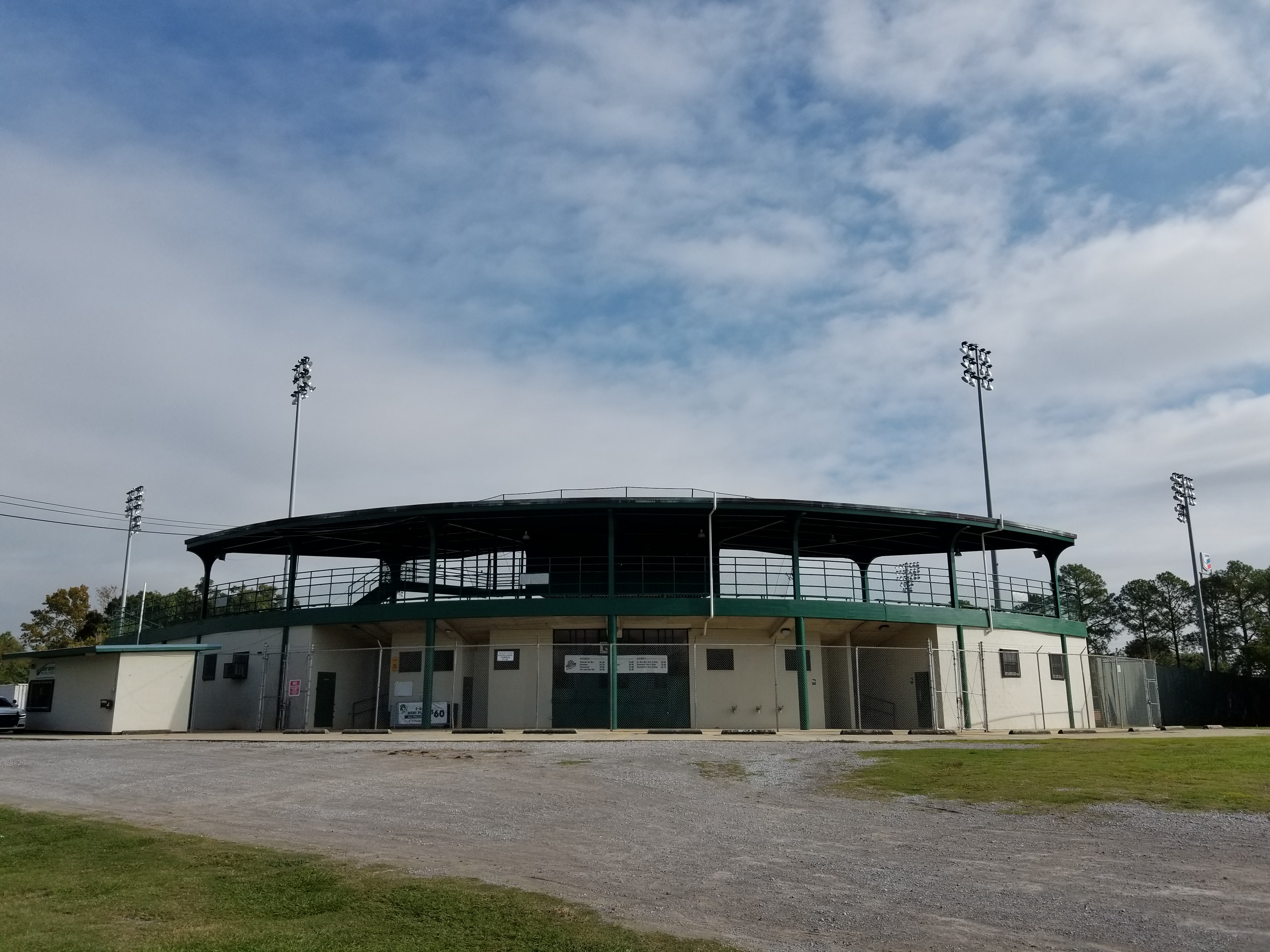
Pete Goldsby Field of Baton Rouge, Louisiana: the most used existing venue for the SWAC Baseball Tournament during its playoff-era.

Year	Champion	Coach	Score	Runner-up	No. of teams	Venue	Location
1977	Jackson State	Robert Braddy	4–0	Southern	2	Pete Goldsby Field	Baton Rouge, LA
1978	Jackson State	Robert Braddy	3–2	Southern	2	University Park	Jackson, MS
1979	Southern	Leroy Boyd	5–3	Jackson State	2	Pete Goldsby Field	Baton Rouge, LA
1980	Jackson State	Robert Braddy	14–4	Southern	2	University Park	Jackson, MS

==== Tournament-era champions ====
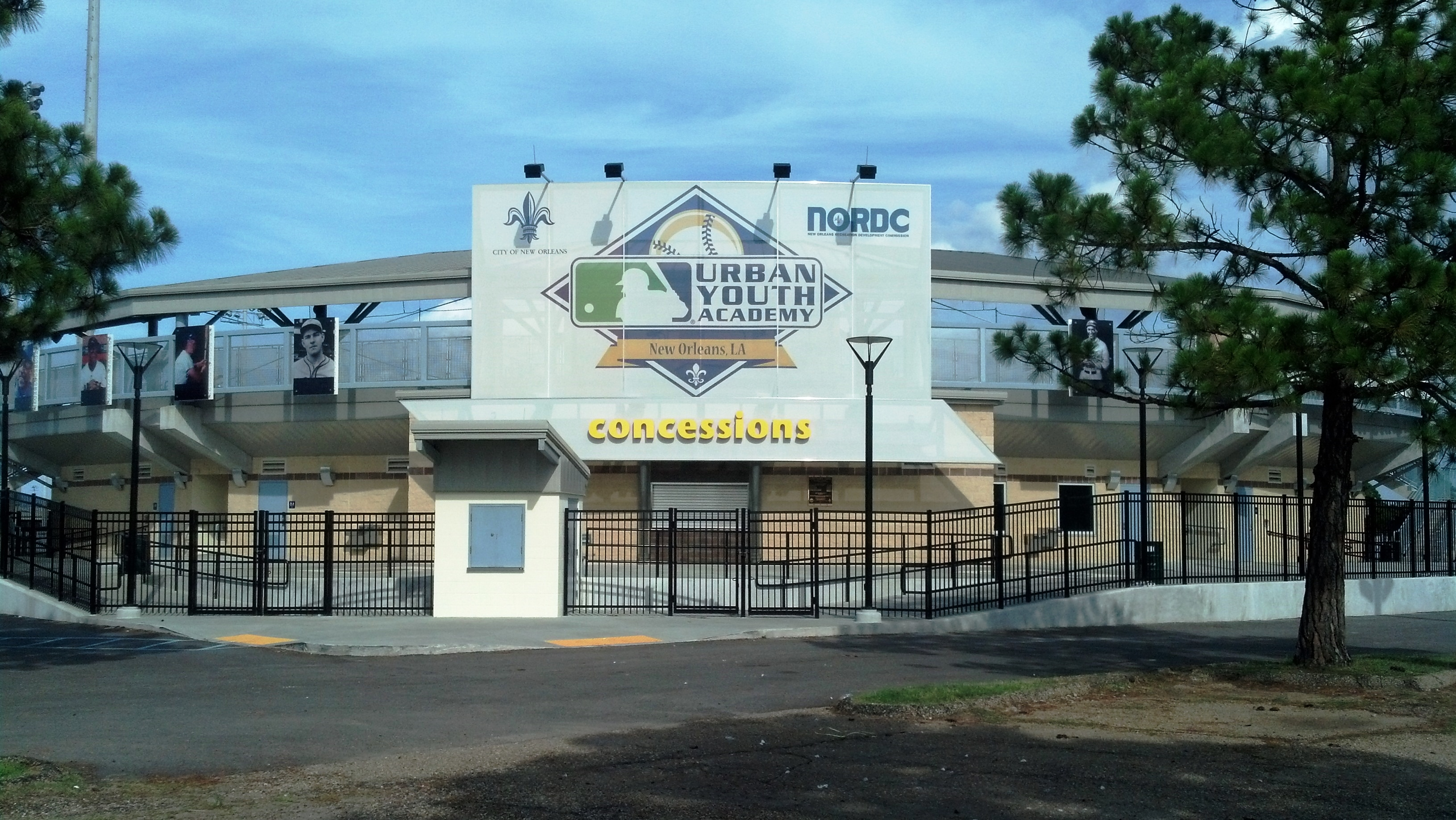
Wesley Barrow Stadium of New Orleans: the second-most used venue for the SWAC Baseball Tournament.

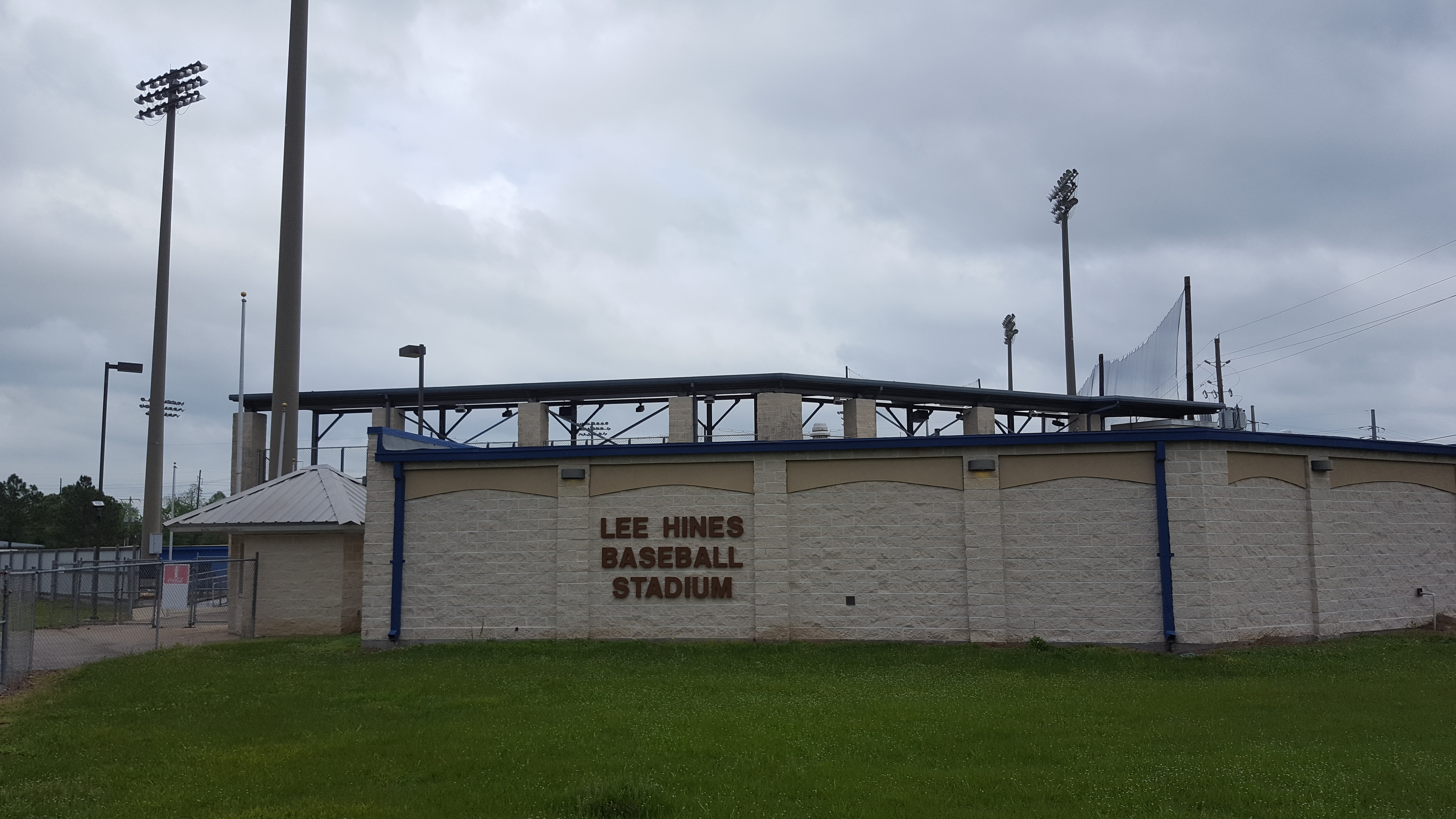
Lee–Hines Field of Southern University in Baton Rouge, Louisiana: the most used existing on-campus venue for the SWAC Baseball Tournament.

Year	Champion(s)	Coach(es)	Score	Runner-up	Number of Teams	Venue(s)	Location
1981	Southern	Leroy Boyd	6–0	Grambling State	4	Tiger Field	Grambling, LA
1982	Jackson State	Robert Braddy	9–8	Southern	4	University Park	Jackson, MS
1983	Grambling State	Wilbert Ellis	10–8 (12 innings)	Southern	4	Tiger Field	Grambling, LA
1984	Grambling State	Wilbert Ellis	7–2	Southern	4	University Park	Jackson, MS
1985	Grambling State	Wilbert Ellis	17–7	Southern	4	Neagle Field	Houston, TX
1986	Jackson State	Robert Braddy	10–5	Southern	4	Bringhurst Field	Alexandria, LA
1987	Southern	Roger Cador	17–13	Jackson State	4	Bringhurst Field	Alexandria, LA
1988	Southern	Roger Cador	14–0	Grambling State	4	Chester Willis Field	Natchez, MS
1989	Jackson State	Robert Braddy	18–4	Grambling State	4	Chester Willis Field	Natchez, MS
1990	Jackson State	Robert Braddy	6–4	Grambling State	4	Chester Willis Field	Natchez, MS
1991	Southern	Roger Cador	5–2	Jackson State	4	Chester Willis Field	Natchez, MS
1992	Southern	Roger Cador	10–6	Jackson State	4	Chester Willis Field	Natchez, MS
1993	Jackson State	Robert Braddy	(championship game canceled, due to inclement weather)		4	Chester Willis Field	Natchez, MS
1993	Southern	Roger Cador	(championship game canceled, due to inclement weather)		4	Chester Willis Field	Natchez, MS
1994	Jackson State	Robert Braddy	6–5	Southern	4	Chester Willis Field	Natchez, MS
1995	Jackson State	Robert Braddy	10–4	Southern	4	Chester Willis Field	Natchez, MS
1996	Southern	Roger Cador	7–3	Jackson State	4	"Rags" Scheuermann Field at Kirsch-Rooney Stadium	New Orleans, LA
1997	Southern	Roger Cador	12–8	Alcorn State	4	"Rags" Scheuermann Field at Kirsch-Rooney Stadium	New Orleans, LA
1998	Southern	Roger Cador	11–7	Jackson State	4	"Rags" Scheuermann Field at Kirsch-Rooney Stadium	New Orleans, LA
1999	Southern	Roger Cador	13–8	Grambling State	4	"Rags" Scheuermann Field at Kirsch-Rooney Stadium	New Orleans, LA
2000	Jackson State	Robert Braddy	12–11	Grambling State	6	Smith–Wills Stadium	Jackson, MS
2001	Southern	Roger Cador	10–6	Jackson State	6	Fair Grounds Field	Shreveport, LA
2002	Southern	Roger Cador	14–2	Jackson State	6	W. Peyton Shehee, Jr. Stadium	Shreveport, LA
2002	Southern	Roger Cador	14–2	Jackson State	6	Pilot Field	Shreveport, LA
2003	Southern	Roger Cador	10–7	Mississippi Valley State	4	Lee–Hines Field	Baton Rouge, LA
2004	Texas Southern	Candy Robinson	18–1	Mississippi Valley State	4	Baseball USA	Houston, TX
2005	Southern	Roger Cador	6–5 (15 innings)	Prairie View A&M	6	Rickwood Field	Birmingham, AL
2006	Prairie View A&M	Michael Robertson	3–2	Alcorn State	6	Trustmark Park	Pearl, MS
2007	Prairie View A&M	Michael Robertson	8–7	Southern	6	Smith–Wills Stadium	Jackson, MS
2008	Texas Southern	Candy Robinson	12–11	Prairie View A&M	8	Lee–Hines Field	Baton Rouge, LA
2008	Texas Southern	Candy Robinson	12–11	Prairie View A&M	8	Pete Goldsby Field	Baton Rouge, LA
2009	Southern	Roger Cador	12–10	Alcorn State	8	Lee–Hines Field	Baton Rouge, LA
2010	Grambling State	James Cooper	15–2	Alcorn State	8	Fair Grounds Field	Shreveport, LA
2011	Alcorn State	Barrett Rey	12–6	Southern	8	Fair Grounds Field	Shreveport, LA
2012	Prairie View A&M	Waskyla Cullivan	7–4	Mississippi Valley State	8	Lee–Hines Field	Baton Rouge, LA
2013	Jackson State	Omar Johnson	6–2	Prairie View A&M	8	LaGrave Field	Fort Worth, TX
2014	Jackson State	Omar Johnson	9–8	Alabama State	8	Wesley Barrow Stadium	New Orleans, LA
2015	Texas Southern	Michael Robertson	10–0	Southern	8	Wesley Barrow Stadium	New Orleans, LA
2016	Alabama State	Mervyl Melendez	7–5	Texas Southern	8	Wesley Barrow Stadium	New Orleans, LA
2017	Texas Southern	Michael Robertson	4–2 (13 innings)	Alabama State	8	Wesley Barrow Stadium	New Orleans, LA
2018	Texas Southern	Michael Robertson	18–3	Grambling State	8	Wesley Barrow Stadium	New Orleans, LA
2019	Southern	Kerrick Jackson	15–0	Alabama State	8	Wesley Barrow Stadium	New Orleans, LA
2020	(tournament canceled, due to COVID-19 pandemic)				~~8~~	~~Smith–Wills Stadium~~	~~Jackson, MS~~
2021	Southern	Chris Crenshaw	7–6	Jackson State	8	Toyota Field	Madison, AL
2022	Alabama State	José Vázquez	6–5 (14 innings)	Southern	8	Regions Field	Birmingham, AL
2022	Alabama State	José Vázquez	6–5 (14 innings)	Southern	8	Jerry D. Young Memorial Field	Birmingham, AL
2023	Florida A&M	Jamey Shouppe	9–6	Bethune-Cookman	8	Russ Chandler Stadium	Atlanta, GA
2024	Grambling State	Davin Pierre	6–5	Jackson State	8	Russ Chandler Stadium	Atlanta, GA
2025	Bethune-Cookman	Jonathan Hernandez	11–9	Florida A&M	8	Rickwood Field	Birmingham, AL
2026	Alabama State	José Vázquez	8–6	Florida A&M	8	Rickwood Field	Birmingham, AL

Note: in 1993 Jackson State and Southern were declared co-champions, due to weather forcing the cancellation of the SWAC Tournament final.

=== Conference tournament championships by school ===
The following is a list of conference tournament champions, organized by school.

School	Tournament Titles	Year(s)
Southern	19	1950, 1979, 1981, 1987, 1988, 1991, 1992, 1993, 1996, 1997, 1998, 1999, 2001, 2002, 2003, 2005, 2009, 2019, 2021
Jackson State	13	1977, 1978, 1980, 1982, 1986, 1989, 1990, 1993, 1994, 1995, 2000, 2013, 2014
Grambling State	5	1983, 1984, 1985, 2010, 2024
Texas Southern	5	2004, 2008, 2015, 2017, 2018
Alabama State	3	2016, 2022, 2026
Prairie View A&M	3	2006, 2007, 2012
Alcorn State	1	2011
Bethune–Cookman	1	2025
Bishop	1	1949
Florida A&M	1	2023
Texas College	1	1951

Note: schools highlighted in pink are former SWAC members as of the current SWAC season; of current SWAC members, Alabama A&M, Arkansas–Pine Bluff, and Mississippi Valley State have not won a SWAC baseball tournament.

== See also ==
- List of Southwestern Athletic Conference baseball champions
