= 2013 Southwestern Athletic Conference baseball tournament =

- Teams: 8
- Format: Double elimination
- Finals site: LaGrave Field; Fort Worth, TX
- Champions: Jackson State (15th title)
- Winning coach: Omar Johnson (1st title)
- MVP: Alexander Juday (Jackson State)
- Television: ESPNU (Final)

2013 Southwestern Athletic Conference baseball standings
	Conf.				Overall
Team	W		L	PCT	W		L	PCT
East
Jackson State ^{x}‍‍‡‍^{y}	19	–	5	.792	34	–	22	.607
Alabama State ‍‍‍	18	–	6	.750	32	–	25	.561
Alcorn State ‍‍‍	14	–	10	.583	16	–	41	.281
Alabama A&M ‍‍‍	6	–	16	.273	8	–	41	.163
Mississippi Valley State ‍‍‍	1	–	21	.045	5	–	44	.102
West
Southern ^{x}‍‍‍	14	–	10	.583	21	–	23	.477
Arkansas–Pine Bluff ‍‍‍	13	–	11	.542	21	–	32	.396
Prairie View A&M ‍‍‍	12	–	12	.500	27	–	27	.500
Texas Southern ‍‍‍	12	–	12	.500	22	–	29	.431
Grambling State ‍‍‍	9	–	15	.375	18	–	30	.375
x – Division champion ‡ – Tournament champion y – Invited to the NCAA tournament As of June 30, 2013; Rankings from Collegiate Baseball

The 2013 Southwestern Athletic Conference baseball tournament was held at LaGrave Field in Fort Worth, Texas, from May 15 through 19, 2013. First seed from the East Jackson State won their fifteenth tournament championship and earned the conference's automatic bid to the 2013 NCAA Division I baseball tournament.

The double elimination tournament features the top four teams from each division, leaving Mississippi Valley State and Grambling State out of the field.

== Seeding and format ==
The top four finishers in each division were seeded one through four, with the top seed from each division facing the fourth seed from the opposite division in the first round, and so on. The teams then played a two bracket, double-elimination tournament with a one-game final between the winners of each bracket. Prairie View A&M claimed the third seed from the West over Texas Southern by tiebreaker.

Team	W	L	PCT	GB	Seed
East Division
Jackson State	19	5	.792	–	1E
Alabama State	18	6	.750	1	2E
Alcorn State	14	10	.583	5	3E
Alabama A&M	6	16	.273	12	4E
Mississippi Valley State	1	21	.045	17	–
West Division
Southern	14	10	.583	–	1W
Arkansas–Pine Bluff	13	11	.542	1	2W
Prairie View A&M	12	12	.500	2	3W
Texas Southern	12	12	.500	2	4W
Grambling State	9	15	.375	4	–

== Bracket ==
First round
1E	Jackson State	5
4W	Texas Southern	4
2W	Arkansas–Pine Bluff	8
3E	Alcorn State	11
4W	Texas Southern	6
2W	Arkansas–Pine Bluff	5
1W	Southern	7
4E	Alabama A&M	1
2E	Alabama State	16*
3W	Prairie View A&M	0*
4E	Alabama A&M	4
3W	Prairie View A&M	6

Second round
1E	Jackson State	11
3E	Alcorn State	2
3E	Alcorn State	4
4W	Texas Southern	7
1W	Southern	9
2E	Alabama State	10
1W	Southern	4
3W	Prairie View A&M	11

Semifinals
1E	Jackson State	7	—
4W	Texas Southern	4	—
2E	Alabama State	1	3
3W	Prairie View A&M	2	8

Final
1E	Jackson State	6
3W	Prairie View A&M	2

* - Indicates game ended after 7 innings due to mercy rule.

== All-Tournament Team ==
The following players were named to the All-Tournament Team.

Name	Player
Leo Rojas	Alabama State
Dillon Cooper	Alabama State
Angel Polo	Alcorn State
Stephen Wallace	Southern
Jerry Ford II	Texas Southern
Jeff Sealy	Prairie View A&M
Dominiq Harris	Prairie View A&M
A. J. Helms	Prairie View A&M
Aneko Knowles	Jackson State
Charles Tillery	Jackson State
Ethan Bright	Jackson State

=== Most Valuable Player ===
Alexander Juday was named Tournament Most Valuable Player. Juday was a pitcher for Jackson State who earned the victory in the championship game with a complete game and nine strikeouts, while yielding nine hits and two runs.
