= 2017 Southwestern Athletic Conference baseball tournament =

- Teams: 8
- Format: Double elimination
- Finals site: Wesley Barrow Stadium; New Orleans, Louisiana
- Champions: Texas Southern (4th title)
- Winning coach: Michael Robertson (2nd title)
- MVP: Christian Sanchez ((Texas Southern))

2017 Southwestern Athletic Conference baseball standings
	Conf.				Overall
Team	W		L	PCT	W		L	PCT
East
Jackson State ^{x}‍†‍‍	20	–	4	.833	38	–	17	.691
Alabama State ‍‍‍	18	–	6	.750	31	–	25	.554
Alabama A&M ‍‍‍	9	–	15	.375	12	–	45	.211
Alcorn State ‍‍‍	7	–	17	.292	12	–	33	.267
Mississippi Valley State ‍‍‍	6	–	18	.250	7	–	34	.171
West
Grambling State ^{x}‍‍‍	15	–	9	.625	22	–	30	.423
Texas Southern ‍‍‡‍^{y}	14	–	10	.583	20	–	34	.370
Prairie View A&M ‍‍‍	11	–	13	.458	20	–	37	.351
Southern ‍‍‍	10	–	14	.417	17	–	27	.386
Arkansas–Pine Bluff ‍‍‍	10	–	14	.417	15	–	31	.326
x – Division champion † – Conference champion ‡ – Tournament champion y – Invited to the NCAA tournament Rankings from Collegiate Baseball

The 2017 Southwestern Athletic Conference baseball tournament was held place at Wesley Barrow Stadium in New Orleans, Louisiana, from May 17 through 21. The winner of the tournament earned the conference's automatic bid to the 2017 NCAA Division I baseball tournament.

The double elimination tournament features four teams from each division.

== Seeding and format ==
The four eligible teams in each division will be seeded one through four, with the top seed from each division facing the fourth seed from the opposite division in the first round, and so on. The teams then play a two bracket, double-elimination tournament with a one-game final between the winners of each bracket.

Team	W	L	Pct	GB	Seed
Eastern Division
Jackson State	20	4	.833	—	1E
Alabama State	18	6	.750	2	2E
Alabama A&M	9	15	.375	11	3E
Alcorn State	7	17	.292	13	4E
Mississippi Valley State	6	18	.250	14	—
Western Division
Grambling State	15	9	.625	—	1W
Texas Southern	14	10	.583	1	2W
Prairie View A&M	11	13	.458	4	3W
Southern	10	14	.417	5	4W
Arkansas–Pine Bluff	10	14	.417	5	—

== Bracket ==
First round
1E	Jackson State	4
4W	Southern	2
2W	Texas Southern	7
3E	Alabama A&M	4
4W	Southern	6
3E	Alabama A&M	2
1W	Grambling State	6
4E	Alcorn State	7
2E	Alabama State	13
3W	Prairie View	6
1W	Grambling State	6
3W	Prairie View	8

Second round
1E	Jackson State	6
2W	Texas Southern	8
4W	Southern	2
1E	Jackson State	7
4E	Alcorn State	1
2E	Alabama State	6
3W	Prairie View	4
4E	Alcorn State	3

Semifinals
2W	Texas Southern	11	X
1E	Jackson State	2	X
2E	Alabama State	25	X
3W	Prairie View	3	X

Final
2W	Texas Southern	4
2E	Alabama State	2
