= 2014 Southwestern Athletic Conference baseball tournament =

- Teams: 8
- Format: Double elimination
- Finals site: Wesley Barrow Stadium; New Orleans
- Champions: Jackson State (16th title)
- Winning coach: Omar Johnson (2nd title)
- MVP: Desmond Russell (Jackson State)
- Television: ESPNU (Final)

2014 Southwestern Athletic Conference baseball standings
	Conf.				Overall
Team	W		L	PCT	W		L	PCT
East
Alabama State ^{x}‍‍‍	21	–	3	.875	37	–	20	.649
Alabama A&M ‍‍‍	12	–	9	.571	21	–	32	.396
Alcorn State ‍‍‍	10	–	12	.455	11	–	42	.208
Jackson State ‍‍‡‍^{y}	9	–	15	.375	31	–	23	.574
Mississippi Valley State ‍‍‍	4	–	18	.182	4	–	38	.095
West
Arkansas–Pine Bluff ^{x}‍‍‍	16	–	7	.696	22	–	28	.440
Texas Southern ‍‍‍	13	–	9	.591	23	–	29	.442
Prairie View A&M ‍‍‍	11	–	12	.478	21	–	30	.412
Grambling State ‍‍‍	11	–	13	.458	16	–	32	.333
Southern ‍‍‍	6	–	16	.273	10	–	26	.278
x – Division champion ‡ – Tournament champion y – Invited to the NCAA tournament As of May 24, 2014; Rankings from Collegiate Baseball

The 2014 Southwestern Athletic Conference baseball tournament was held at Wesley Barrow Stadium in New Orleans, Louisiana, from May 14 through 18, 2014. Jackson State won their sixteenth tournament championship, and second in a row, to earn the conference's automatic bid to the 2014 NCAA Division I baseball tournament. The event was originally scheduled for LaGrave Field in Fort Worth, Texas, but was moved due to concerns about player safety.

The double elimination tournament features the top four teams from each division, leaving one team from each division out of the field. Mississippi Valley State and Southern did not qualify for the Tournament.

== Seeding and format ==
The top four finishers in each division will be seeded one through four, with the top seed from each division facing the fourth seed from the opposite division in the first round, and so on. The teams then play a two bracket, double-elimination tournament with a one-game final between the winners of each bracket. Alabama State and Arkansas–Pine Bluff won their respective divisions and earned the top seeds.

Team	W	L	Pct.	GB	Seed
East
Alabama State	21	3	.875	–	1E
Alabama A&M	12	9	.571	7.5	2E
Alcorn State	10	12	.455	10	3E
Jackson State	9	15	.375	12	4E
Mississippi Valley State	4	18	.182	16	–
West
Arkansas–Pine Bluff	16	7	.696	–	1W
Texas Southern	13	9	.591	2.5	2W
Prairie View A&M	11	12	.478	5	3W
Grambling State	11	13	.458	5.5	4W
Southern	6	16	.273	9.5	–

== Bracket ==
First round
1E	Alabama State	11*
4W	Grambling State	10*
2W	Texas Southern	4†
3E	Alcorn State	5†
4W	Grambling State	14
2W	Texas Southern	8
1W	Arkansas–Pine Bluff	1
4E	Jackson State	7
2E	Alabama A&M	11
3W	Prairie View A&M	5
1W	Arkansas–Pine Bluff	9
3W	Prairie View A&M	12

Second round
1E	Alabama State	6
3E	Alcorn State	2
3E	Alcorn State	2
4W	Grambling State	13
4E	Jackson State	12
2E	Alabama A&M	3
2E	Alabama A&M	2
3W	Prairie View A&M	9

Semifinals
1E	Alabama State	15	—
4W	Grambling State	6	—
4E	Jackson State	8	—
3W	Prairie View A&M	4	—

Final
1E	Alabama State	8
4E	Jackson State	9

* - Indicates game required 11 innings.
† - Indicates game required 10 innings.

== All-Tournament Team ==
The following players were named to the All-Tournament Team.

Name	School
Julio Nunez	Alabama A&M
Scotty Peavey	Alcorn State
Juan Bueno	Grambling State
Dominic Harris	Prairie View A&M
Greg Salcido	Prairie View A&M
Chad Flick	Prairie View A&M
Felix Gomez	Texas Southern
Emmanuel Marrero	Alabama State
Richard Amion	Alabama State
Waldyvan Estrada	Alabama State
Alex Juday	Jackson State

=== Most Valuable Player ===
Desmond Russell was named Tournament Most Valuable Player. Russell was a pitcher for Jackson State, recording 11 strikeouts in the tournament.
