= James Cooper (coach) =

American baseball coach & player (born 1982)

Biographical details
- Born: February 12, 1982 (age 44); Shreveport, Louisiana, U.S.

Playing career
- 2001–2004: Grambling State
- 2004-2005: Tri-City ValleyCats
- 2006: Sussex Skyhawks
- Position: Outfielder

Coaching career (HC unless noted)
- 2007–2009: Grambling State (Asst.)
- 2010–2021: Grambling State

Head coaching record
- Overall: 232–329
- Tournaments: SWAC: 17–18; NCAA: 0–2

Accomplishments and honors

Championships
- SWAC champion (2010)

Awards
- SWAC Coach of the Year (2010, 2017)

James Cooper (born February 12, 1982) is an American baseball coach and former outfielder. He played college baseball for the Grambling State Tigers from 2001 to 2004 before playing professionally from 2004 to 2006. He then served as head coach of the Grambling State Tigers (2010–2021).

== Playing career ==
Cooper was an outfielder for Grambling, where he earned All-Conference honors and played under longtime head coach Wilbert Ellis. He was drafted in the 33rd round of the 2004 MLB draft by the Houston Astros. He played two seasons in the Astros system, reaching Class A, and one season of independent baseball in the CanAm League for the Sussex Skyhawks before ending his playing career.

== Coaching career ==
=== Grambling State ===
Cooper returned to Grambling as an assistant to new head coach Barret Rey. He helped rebuild the Tigers program, qualifying for a pair of Southwestern Athletic Conference baseball tournament appearances in three years. With Rey's departure for SWAC rival Alcorn State, Cooper was elevated to head coach. In his first season, Cooper led the Tigers to a SWAC Tournament championship and an appearance in the NCAA Regional. Cooper earned SWAC Coach of the Year honors for his efforts. During the 2019 season, Cooper obtained his 200th victory with a 19–2 win over University of Arkansas Pine Bluff on April 20, 2019. On November 9, 2021, Cooper resigned from his position with Grambling State to pursue a job with the New York Yankees.

=== New York Yankees ===
On November 10, 2021, Cooper accepted an outfield and baserunning position in the New York Yankees organization.

On January 26, 2024, Cooper was named manager of the Yankees' Single-A affiliate Tampa Tarpons, replacing Rachel Balkovec. Cooper was named manager of the Hudson Valley Renegades, the Yankees High-A affiliate on January 24, 2025.

In 2026, Cooper was named manager of the Somerset Patriots, the Yankees' Double-A affiliate. On July 2, 2026, Cooper was announced as the third base coach for the American League at the All-Star Futures Game.

== Head coaching record ==
Record table
Season	Team	Overall	Conference	Standing	Postseason
Grambling State Tigers (Southwestern Athletic Conference) (2010–2021)
2010	Grambling State	22–32	10–13	3rd (West) (5)	NCAA Regional
2011	Grambling State	23–26	15–9	2nd (West) (5)	SWAC tournament
2012	Grambling State	22–26	13–11	3rd (West) (5)	SWAC tournament (Note: The top four teams in each four team division qualified for the SWAC Tournament in 2012.)
2013	Grambling State	18–30	9–15	5th (West) (5)	
2014	Grambling State	16–31	11–13	4th (West) (5)	SWAC tournament (Note: The top four teams in each four team division qualified for the SWAC Tournament in 2014.)
2015	Grambling State	11–39	9–20	4th (West)	SWAC tournament (Note: The top four teams in each four team division qualified for the SWAC Tournament in 2015.)
2016	Grambling State	22–27	15–8	2nd (West)	SWAC tournament (Note: The top four teams in each four team division qualified for the SWAC Tournament in 2016.)
2017	Grambling State	22–30	15–9	1st (West)	SWAC tournament (Note: The top four teams in each four team division qualified for the SWAC Tournament in 2017.)
2018	Grambling State	26–26	14–10	2nd (West)	SWAC tournament (Note: The top four teams in each four team division qualified for the SWAC Tournament in 2018.)
2019	Grambling State	27–25	16–8	2nd (West)	SWAC tournament (Note: The top four teams in each four team division qualified for the SWAC Tournament in 2019.)
2020	Grambling State	6–10	1–2	(West)	Season canceled due to COVID-19
2021	Grambling State	17–27	12–9	2nd (West)	SWAC tournament
Grambling State:		232–329	140–127		
Total:		232–329			
National champion Postseason invitational champion Conference regular season champion Conference regular season and conference tournament champion Division regular season champion Division regular season and conference tournament champion Conference tournament champion
