= 2021 Southwestern Athletic Conference baseball tournament =

- Teams: 8
- Format: Double elimination
- Finals site: Toyota Field; Madison, Alabama
- Champions: Southern (17th title)
- Winning coach: Chris Crenshaw (1st title)
- MVP: O’Neill Burgos (Southern)
- Television: SWAC DN (Friday & Saturday); ESPNews (Championship)

2021 Southwestern Athletic Conference baseball standings
	Conf.				Overall
Team	W		L	PCT	W		L	PCT
East
Jackson State ^{x}‍‍‍	24	–	0	1.000	34	–	9	.791
Alabama State ‍‍‍	14	–	7	.667	23	–	19	.548
Alabama A&M ‍‍‍	9	–	13	.409	9	–	20	.310
Alcorn State ‍‍‍	6	–	16	.273	7	–	20	.259
Mississippi Valley State ‍‍‍	0	–	17	.000	0	–	20	.000
West
Prairie View A&M ^{x}‍‍‍	12	–	7	.632	14	–	18	.438
Grambling State ‍‍‍	12	–	9	.571	17	–	27	.386
Southern ‍‍‡‍^{y}	13	–	11	.542	20	–	29	.408
Texas Southern ‍‍‍	10	–	14	.417	12	–	35	.255
Arkansas–Pine Bluff ‍‍‍	8	–	14	.364	8	–	30	.211
x – Division champion ‡ – Tournament champion y – Invited to the NCAA tournament As of June 4, 2021; Rankings from Collegiate Baseball

The 2021 Southwestern Athletic Conference baseball tournament was held at Toyota Field in Madison, Alabama from May 19 through 23. Southern won the Tournament for the 17th time and earned the conference's automatic bid to the 2021 NCAA Division I baseball tournament.

The double elimination tournament featured four teams from each division.

== Seeding and format ==
The four eligible teams in each division were seeded one through four, with the top seed from each division facing the fourth seed from the opposite division in the first round, and so on. The teams then played a two bracket, double-elimination tournament with a one-game final between the winners of each bracket.

East Division
Team	W	L	Pct.	GB	Seed
Jackson State	24	0	1.000	—	1E
Alabama State	14	7	.667	7	2E
Alabama A&M	9	13	.409	13.5	3E
Alcorn State	6	16	.273	17	4E
Mississippi Valley State	0	17	.000	20.5	—

West Division
Team	W	L	Pct.	GB	Seed
Prairie View A&M	12	7	.632	—	1W
Grambling State	12	9	.571	1	2W
Southern	13	11	.542	1.5	3W
Texas Southern	10	14	.417	4.5	4W
Arkansas–Pine Bluff	8	14	.364	5.5	—

== Tournament ==
=== Bracket ===
First round
1E	Jackson State	7
4W	Texas Southern	4
2W	Grambling State	8
3E	Alabama A&M	1
4W	Texas Southern	12
3E	Alabama A&M	7
1W	Prairie View A&M	2
4E	Alcorn State	0
2E	Alabama State	0
3W	Southern	3
4E	Alcorn State	3
2E	Alabama State	2

Second round
1E	Jackson State	14
2W	Grambling State	13
2W	Grambling State	5
4W	Texas Southern	2
1W	Prairie View A&M	2
3W	Southern	1
2W	Southern	10
4E	Alcorn State	5

Semifinals
1E	Jackson State	9	—
2W	Grambling State	5	—
1W	Prairie View A&M	3	4
3W	Southern	24	8

Finals
1E	Jackson State	6
3W	Southern	7

=== Game results ===
Date	Game	Winner	Score	Loser	Notes
May 19	Game 1	(2W) Grambling State	8–1	(3E) Alabama A&M	
May 19	Game 2	(3W) Southern	3–0	(2E) Alabama State	
May 19	Game 3	(1E) Jackson State	7–4	(4W) Texas Southern	
May 19	Game 4	(1W) Prairie View A&M	2–0	(4E) Alcorn State	
May 20	Game 5	(4W) Texas Southern	12–7	(3E) Alabama A&M	Alabama A&M eliminated
May 20	Game 6	(4E) Alcorn State	3–2	(2E) Alabama State	Alabama State eliminated
May 20	Game 7	(1E) Jackson State	14–13	(2W) Grambling State	
May 20	Game 8	(1W) Prairie View A&M	2–1	(3W) Southern	
May 21	Game 9	(2W) Grambling State	5–2	(4W) Texas Southern	Texas Southern eliminated
May 21	Game 10	(3W) Southern	10–5	(4E) Alcorn State	Alcorn State eliminated
May 21	Game 11	(1E) Jackson State	9–5	(2W) Grambling State	Grambling State eliminated
May 21	Game 12	(3W) Southern	24–3	(1W) Prairie View A&M	
May 22	Game 13	(3W) Southern	8–4	(1W) Prairie View A&M	Prairie View A&M eliminated
May 23	Game 14	(3W) Southern	7–6	(1E) Jackson State	Southern wins SWAC Tournament

== All-Tournament Team ==
The following players were named to the All-Tournament Team.

Name	School
Isaiah Adams	Southern
Chenar Brown	Jackson State
Cameron Bufford	Grambling State
O’Neill Burgos	Southern
Colton Frank	Southern
Nickelle Galatas	Jackson State
Xavian Moore	Southern
Enrique Ozoa	Southern
Jahmoi Percival	Grambling State
Wesley Reyes	Jackson State
Equon Smith	Jackson State
Kyle Smith	Prairie View A&M

=== Most Valuable Player ===
O’Neill Burgos was named Tournament Most Valuable Player. Burgos was a designated hitter for Southern.
