= 2012 Southwestern Athletic Conference baseball tournament =

- 2012 SWAC baseball tournament logo
- Teams: 8
- Format: Double elimination
- Finals site: Lee–Hines Field; Baton Rouge, LA
- Champions: Prairie View A&M (3rd title)
- MVP: Evan Richard (Prairie View A&M)
- Television: ESPNU (Final)

2012 Southwestern Athletic Conference baseball standings
	Conf.						Overall
Team	W		L		T	PCT	W		L		T	PCT
East
Jackson State ^{x}‍‍‍	21	–	3	–	0	.875	35	–	16	–	0	.686
Alabama State ‍‍‍	14	–	10	–	0	.583	20	–	36	–	0	.357
Alcorn State ‍‍‍	14	–	10	–	0	.583	18	–	37	–	0	.327
Mississippi Valley State ‍‍‍	10	–	14	–	0	.417	17	–	39	–	0	.304
Alabama A&M ‍‍‍	1	–	23	–	0	.042	8	–	42	–	0	.160
West
Southern ^{x}‍‍‍	17	–	7	–	0	.708	33	–	16	–	0	.673
Prairie View A&M ‍‍‡‍^{y}	15	–	8	–	0	.652	28	–	25	–	0	.528
Grambling State ‍‍‍	13	–	11	–	0	.542	22	–	26	–	0	.458
Texas Southern ‍‍‍	8	–	15	–	0	.348	26	–	27	–	0	.491
Arkansas–Pine Bluff ‍‍‍	6	–	18	–	0	.250	8	–	38	–	1	.181
x – Division champion ‡ – Tournament champion y – Invited to the NCAA tournament As of June 30, 2012; Rankings from Collegiate Baseball

The 2012 Southwestern Athletic Conference baseball tournament took place at Lee–Hines Field, on the campus of Southern University in Baton Rouge, LA from May 16 through 20, 2012. The Prairie View A&M Panthers won their third tournament championship and earned the conference's automatic bid to the 2012 NCAA Division I baseball tournament.

The double elimination tournament featured the top four teams from each division, leaving one team from each division out of the field.

== Seeding ==
The top four finishers in each division were seeded one through four, with the top seed from each division facing the fourth seed from the opposite division in the first round, and so on. Alcorn State claimed the second seed from the East by tiebreaker over Alabama State. The teams played a two bracket, double-elimination tournament with a one-game final between the winners of each bracket.

Team	W	L	PCT	GB	Seed
East Division
Jackson State	21	3	.875	–	E1
Alcorn State	14	10	.583	7	E2
Alabama State	14	10	.583	7	E3
Mississippi Valley State	10	14	.487	11	E4
Alabama A&M	1	23	.042	20	–
West Division
Southern	17	7	.708	–	W1
Prairie View A&M	15	8	.652	1.5	W2
Grambling	13	11	.542	4	W3
Texas Southern	8	15	.348	8.5	W4
Arkansas–Pine Bluff	6	18	.250	11	–

== Bracket ==
First round
W3	Grambling	2
E2	Alcorn State	6
E4	Mississippi Valley St.	6
W1	Southern	4
W1	Southern	8
W3	Grambling	0
E3	Alabama State	4
W2	Prairie View A&M	14
W4	Texas Southern	0
E1	Jackson State	7
E3	Alabama State	3
W4	Texas Southern	6

Second round
E2	Alcorn State	6
E4	Mississippi Valley St.	7
W1	Southern	8
E2	Alcorn State	6
E1	Jackson State	0
W2	Prairie View A&M	2
W4	Texas Southern	11
E1	Jackson State	1

Semifinals
E4	Mississippi Valley St.	2
W1	Southern	1
W2	Prairie View A&M	0	8
W4	Texas Southern	2	5

Final
E4	Mississippi Valley St.	4
W2	Prairie View A&M	7

== All-Tournament Team ==
The following players were named to the All-Tournament Team.

POS	Name	School
C	Evan Richard	Prairie View A&M
P	Daniel Castillo	Prairie View A&M
P/DH	Stef Hernandez	Prairie View A&M
SS	James Fontenot	Prairie View A&M
OF	Allen Cheek	Mississippi Valley State
1B	Joseph Germaine	Mississippi Valley State
2B	Edmund Cheatham	Mississippi Valley State
P	Trey Lacy	Mississippi Valley State
1B	Anthony Dilligard	Texas Southern
3B	Lacy Jackson	Texas Southern
P	Brian Foster	Southern
OF	Wilmy Marerro	Southern

=== Most Valuable Player ===
Evan Richard was named Most Valuable Player. Richard was a catcher for Prairie View A&M.
