= Carlos James =

American baseball coach (born 1971)

Biographical details
- Born: October 12, 1971 (age 55); Pine Bluff, Arkansas, U.S.

Playing career
- 1991–1992: Seminole State
- 1993–1994: Arkansas
- 1995–1996: Pine Bluff Locomotives
- Position: Outfielder

Coaching career (HC unless noted)
- 2000–2004: Arkansas–Pine Bluff (Asst.)
- 2008–2010: Arkansas–Monticello
- 2011–2024: Arkansas–Pine Bluff

Head coaching record
- Overall: 211–415–2
- Tournaments: SWAC: 1–8; NCAA: 0–0

Accomplishments and honors

Awards
- SWAC Coach of the Year (2013)

Carlos James (born October 12, 1971) is an American college baseball coach, formerly the head coach of the Arkansas–Pine Bluff Golden Lions baseball program. He was named to that position prior to the 2011 NCAA Division I baseball season.

== Playing career ==
James was drafted out of high school by the Oakland Athletics in the 1990 MLB draft, but elected to play college ball at Seminole State College of Oklahoma. He played two seasons with the Trojans, and reached the NJCAA College World Series in both the 1991 and 1992 seasons. He then completed his eligibility at Arkansas. After his time with the Razorbacks, James played a pair of seasons with the Independent, Pine Bluff Locomotives.

== Coaching career ==
James served as manager of the Arkansas Prospects of Little Rock and APAK Scout Team of Memphis, travelling teams designed to showcase talent to college and professional coaches and scouts. James also served as a scout for the Seattle Mariners. He served as an assistant coach with Arkansas–Pine Bluff from 2000–2004, and also coached local teams in Pine Bluff. He was named interim head coach at Arkansas–Monticello in 2008 before becoming full-time head coach the following season. He improved the struggling program and helped them compete in the Gulf South Conference, as the first African-American to be named head coach in any sport at UAM, and the first for baseball in the Gulf South. In 2011, James became head coach at Arkansas–Pine Bluff, and earned Southwestern Athletic Conference Coach of the Year in 2013. and in his fourth season led the Golden Lions to their first ever 2014 SWAC Western Division Championship in school history. James announced via social media on May 28, 2024 that he was leaving Pine Bluff after 14 seasons.

== Head coaching record ==
This table shows James' record as a head coach at the Division I level.

Record table
Season	Team	Overall	Conference	Standing	Postseason
Arkansas–Pine Bluff Golden Lions (Southwestern Athletic Conference) (2011–2024)
2011	Arkansas–Pine Bluff	11–34	7–17	5th (West) (5)	
2012	Arkansas–Pine Bluff	8–38–1	6–18	5th (West) (5)	
2013	Arkansas–Pine Bluff	21–30	13–11	2nd (West) (5)	SWAC Tournament (Note: The top four finishers in each of the SWAC's two five-team divisions qualified for the tournament in 2013)
2014	Arkansas–Pine Bluff	22–28	16–7	1st (West) (5)	SWAC Tournament (Note: The top four finishers in each of the SWAC's two five-team divisions qualified for the tournament in 2014)
2015	Arkansas–Pine Bluff	25–16	14–6	1st (West) (5)	Ineligible (Note: Ineligible for postseason play due to APR penalties)
2016	Arkansas–Pine Bluff	22–25	16–5	1st (West) (5)	SWAC Tournament (Note: The top four finishers in each of the SWAC's two five-team divisions qualified for the tournament in 2016)
2017	Arkansas–Pine Bluff	15–31	10–14	5th (West) (5)	
2018	Arkansas–Pine Bluff	20–25	12–10	3rd (West) (5)	SWAC Tournament (Note: The top four finishers in each of the SWAC's two five-team divisions qualified for the tournament in 2018)
2019	Arkansas–Pine Bluff	8–42	3–19	5th (West)	
2020	Arkansas–Pine Bluff	6–12	3–3	(West)	Season canceled due to COVID-19
2021	Arkansas–Pine Bluff	8–30	8–14	5th (West)	
2022	Arkansas–Pine Bluff	13–36–1	9–21	5th (West)	
2023	Arkansas–Pine Bluff	18–33	10–22	5th (West)	
2024	Arkansas–Pine Bluff	14–35	6–21	5th (West)	
Arkansas–Pine Bluff:		211–415–2	143–188		
Total:		211–415–2			
National champion Postseason invitational champion Conference regular season champion Conference regular season and conference tournament champion Division regular season champion Division regular season and conference tournament champion Conference tournament champion
