= Michael Robertson (baseball) =

American baseball player and coach

Current position
- Title: Head coach
- Team: Texas Southern
- Conference: SWAC
- Record: 384–464–1

Biographical details
- Education: Huston–Tillotson University

Playing career
- 1984–1987: Huston–Tillotson

Coaching career (HC unless noted)
- 2002: Houston (TX) Forest Brook
- 2003–2008: Prairie View A&M
- 2009–present: Texas Southern

Head coaching record
- Overall: 547–635–1
- Tournaments: SWAC 25–17; NCAA: 0–10

Accomplishments and honors

Championships
- 5× SWAC West Division (2006, 2007, 2010, 2018, 2024); 5× SWAC Tournament (2006, 2007, 2015, 2017, 2018)

Awards
- SWAC Coach of the Year (2024)

Michael Robertson is an American college baseball coach, currently serving as head coach of the Texas Southern team. He was previously the head coach at Prairie View A&M University.

== Head coaching record ==
Record table
Season	Team	Overall	Conference	Standing	Postseason
Prairie View A&M Panthers (Southwestern Athletic Conference) (2003–2007)
2003	Prairie View A&M	10–45	7–23	4th (West)	SWAC tournament
2004	Prairie View A&M	30–26	17–15	3rd (West)	SWAC tournament
2005	Prairie View A&M	31–27	13–11	3rd (West)	SWAC tournament
2006	Prairie View A&M	33–22	17–7	1st (West)	NCAA Regional
2007	Prairie View A&M	34–25	17–7	1st (West)	NCAA Regional
2008	Prairie View A&M	25–26	14–10	3rd (West)	SWAC tournament
Prairie View A&M:		163–171	85–73		
Texas Southern Tigers (Southwestern Athletic Conference) (2008–present)
2009	Texas Southern	16–30	10–14	4th (West)	SWAC tournament
2010	Texas Southern	30–26	18–6	1st (West)	SWAC tournament
2011	Texas Southern	25–29	10–14	4th (West)	SWAC tournament
2012	Texas Southern	26–28	8–13	4th (West)	SWAC tournament
2013	Texas Southern	22–29	12–12	4th (West)	SWAC tournament
2014	Texas Southern	23–29	13–9	2nd (West)	SWAC tournament
2015	Texas Southern	31–19	16–6	2nd (West)	NCAA Regional
2016	Texas Southern	24–26	13–10	3rd (West)	SWAC tournament
2017	Texas Southern	20–34	14–10	2nd (West)	NCAA Regional
2018	Texas Southern	27–28	17–6	1st (West)	NCAA Regional
2019	Texas Southern	20–34	13–11	3rd (West)	SWAC tournament
2020	Texas Southern	7–12	4–2	(West)	Season canceled due to COVID-19
2021	Texas Southern	12–35	10–13	4th (West)	Season canceled due to COVID-19
2022	Texas Southern	28–25	19–11	3rd (West)	SWAC tournament
2023	Texas Southern	31–22	17–10	3rd (West)	SWAC tournament
2024	Texas Southern	22–25	17–6	1st (West)	SWAC tournament
2025	Texas Southern	20–33–1	13–16–1	9th	SWAC tournament
Texas Southern:		384–464–1	224–169–1		
Total:		547–635–1			
National champion Postseason invitational champion Conference regular season champion Conference regular season and conference tournament champion Division regular season champion Division regular season and conference tournament champion Conference tournament champion

== See also ==
- List of current NCAA Division I baseball coaches
