= 2016 Southwestern Athletic Conference baseball tournament =

2016 baseball tournament in New Orleans

- Teams: 8
- Format: Double elimination
- Finals site: Wesley Barrow Stadium; New Orleans, LA
- Champions: Alabama State (1st title)
- Winning coach: Mervyl Melendez (1st title)
- MVP: Dillon Cooper ((Alabama State))

2016 Southwestern Athletic Conference baseball standings
	Conf.				Overall
Team	W		L	PCT	W		L	PCT
East
Alabama State ^{x}‍‍‡‍^{y}	24	–	0	1.000	38	–	17	.691
Jackson State ‍‍‍	14	–	10	.583	34	–	26	.567
Alcorn State ‍‍‍	10	–	14	.417	16	–	36	.308
Alabama A&M ‍‍‍	8	–	16	.333	13	–	44	.228
Mississippi Valley State ‍‍‍	4	–	20	.167	6	–	36	.143
West
Arkansas–Pine Bluff ^{x}‍‍‍	16	–	5	.762	22	–	25	.468
Grambling State ‍‍‍	15	–	8	.652	22	–	27	.449
Texas Southern ‍‍‍	13	–	10	.565	24	–	26	.480
Southern ‍‍‍	6	–	14	.300	14	–	32	.304
Prairie View A&M ‍‍‍	5	–	18	.217	10	–	32	.238
‡ – Tournament champion y – Invited to the NCAA tournament As of June 11, 2016; Rankings from Collegiate Baseball

The 2016 Southwestern Athletic Conference baseball tournament was held at Wesley Barrow Stadium in New Orleans, Louisiana, from May 18 through 22. Alabama State won their first tournament championship and earned the conference's automatic bid to the 2016 NCAA Division I baseball tournament. The Hornets swept through the tournament after completed an undefeated season in the conference's regular season.

The double elimination tournament features four teams from each division.

== Seeding and format ==
The four eligible teams in each division are seeded one through four, with the top seed from each division facing the fourth seed from the opposite division in the first round, and so on. The teams then played a two bracket, double-elimination tournament with a one-game final between the winners of each bracket.

Team	W	L	Pct	GB	Seed
Eastern Division
Alabama State	24	0	1.000	—	1E
Jackson State	14	10	.583	10	2E
Alcorn State	10	14	.417	14	3E
Alabama A&M	8	16	.333	16	4E
Mississippi Valley State	4	20	.167	20	—
Western Division
Arkansas–Pine Bluff	16	5	.762	—	1W
Grambling State	15	8	.652	2	2W
Texas Southern	13	10	.565	4	3W
Southern	6	14	.300	9.5	4W
Prairie View A&M	5	18	.217	12	—

== Bracket ==
First round
1E	Alabama State	27
4W	Southern	9
2W	Grambling State	7
3E	Alcorn State	8
2W	Grambling State	3
4W	Southern	6
1W	Arkansas–Pine Bluff	16
4E	Alabama A&M	6
2E	Jackson State	2
3W	Texas Southern	10
2E	Jackson State	15
4E	Alabama A&M	3

Second round
1E	Alabama State	16
3E	Alcorn State	3
3E	Alcorn State	10
4W	Southern	11
1W	Arkansas-Pine Bluff	0
3W	Texas Southern	10
2E	Jackson State	4
1W	Arkansas-Pine Bluff	2

Semifinals
1E	Alabama State	9	−
4W	Southern	7	−
3W	Texas Southern	15	−
2E	Jackson State	4	−

Final
1E	Alabama State	7
3W	Texas Southern	5

== Notes ==
- Alabama States sets a new tournament record with 27 runs in their victory over Southern.
