= Omar Johnson (baseball) =

American baseball player and coach

Current position
- Title: Head coach
- Team: Jackson State
- Conference: SWAC
- Record: 603–392

Biographical details
- Born: Miami, Florida, U.S.

Playing career
- 1995–1996: North Alabama
- Position: Outfielder

Coaching career (HC unless noted)
- 1997–2006: North Alabama (asst)
- 2007–present: Jackson State

Head coaching record
- Overall: 603–392
- Tournaments: SWAC 25–21; NCAA: 1–4

Accomplishments and honors

Championships
- 2× SWAC Tournament (2013, 2014); 7x SWAC East division (2007–08, 10, 12–13, 17, 21)

Awards
- SWAC Coach of the Year (2021)

Omar Johnson is an American college baseball coach and former outfielder. Johnson is the head coach of the Jackson State Tigers baseball team.

== Early life ==
Johnson was raised in Miami, Florida and attended Miami Senior High School.

Johnson attended the University of North Alabama, where he played for the North Alabama Lions baseball team as an outfielder.

== Coaching career ==
Johnson served as an assistant for North Alabama before being named the head coach at Jackson State University in June 2006. Johnson coached the German national baseball team at the World Baseball Challenge in 2009.

== Head coaching record ==
Record table
Season	Team	Overall	Conference	Standing	Postseason
Jackson State Tigers (Southwestern Athletic Conference) (2007–present)
2007	Jackson State	33–23	17–7	1st (East)	SWAC tournament
2008	Jackson State	37–22	18–5	1st (East)	SWAC tournament
2009	Jackson State	36–21	16–10	2nd (East)	SWAC tournament
2010	Jackson State	36–17	19–6	1st (East)	SWAC tournament
2011	Jackson State	27–26	14–10	3rd (East)	SWAC tournament
2012	Jackson State	34–17	21–3	1st (East)	SWAC tournament
2013	Jackson State	34–22	19–5	1st (East)	NCAA Regional
2014	Jackson State	32–25	9–15	4th (East)	NCAA Regional
2015	Jackson State	32–25	15–9	3rd (East)	SWAC tournament
2016	Jackson State	34–26	14–10	2nd (East)	SWAC tournament
2017	Jackson State	38–17	20–4	1st (East)	SWAC tournament
2018	Jackson State	34–18	17–7	2nd (East)	SWAC tournament
2019	Jackson State	31–24	15–9	2nd (East)	SWAC tournament
2020	Jackson State	9–7	3–0	(East)	Season canceled due to COVID-19
2021	Jackson State	34–9	24–0	1st (East)	SWAC tournament
2022	Jackson State	29–27	16–14	4th (East)	SWAC tournament
2023	Jackson State	28–25	13–17	4th (East)	SWAC tournament
2024	Jackson State	36–20	17–11	3rd (East)	SWAC tournament
2025	Jackson State	29–21	15–12	7th	SWAC tournament
Jackson State:		603–392	302–154		
Total:		603–392			
National champion Postseason invitational champion Conference regular season champion Conference regular season and conference tournament champion Division regular season champion Division regular season and conference tournament champion Conference tournament champion

== See also ==
- List of current NCAA Division I baseball coaches
