= Davin Pierre =

Current position
- Title: Head coach
- Team: Grambling State
- Conference: SWAC
- Record: 106–113

Playing career
- 2002–2005: Grambling State
- Position: Shortstop

Coaching career (HC unless noted)
- 2010–2021: Grambling State (RC)
- 2022–present: Grambling State

Administrative career (AD unless noted)
- 2006–2009: Grambling State (Dir. Ath. Opp.)

Head coaching record
- Overall: 106–113
- Tournaments: SWAC: 6–6; NCAA: 0–2

Davin Pierre is a baseball coach and former player, who is the current head baseball coach of the Grambling State Tigers. He played college baseball at Grambling State from 2002 to 2005 for head coach James Randall.

== Playing career ==
Pierre attended Grambling State University, where he played baseball.

== Coaching career ==
Pierre joined the Tigers baseball staff as an assistant in 2009. On November 10, 2021, Pierre was promoted to interim head coach following the resignation of James Cooper. He was promoted to head coach on October 21, 2022.

== Head coaching record ==
Record table
Season	Team	Overall	Conference	Standing	Postseason
Grambling State Tigers (Southwestern Athletic Conference) (2022–present)
2022	Grambling State	26–31	20–10	2nd (West)	SWAC Tournament
2023	Grambling State	29–26	21–7	1st (West)	SWAC Tournament
2024	Grambling State	26–28	17–7	2nd (West)	NCAA Regional
2025	Grambling State	25–29	17–12	5th	SWAC Tournament
Grambling State:		106–113	75–36		
Total:		106–113			
National champion Postseason invitational champion Conference regular season champion Conference regular season and conference tournament champion Division regular season champion Division regular season and conference tournament champion Conference tournament champion
