= Jonathan Hernandez (baseball coach) =

American baseball coach (born 1985)

Current position
- Title: Head coach
- Team: Bethune–Cookman
- Conference: SWAC
- Record: 189–177

Biographical details
- Born: July 18, 1985 (age 41)

Coaching career (HC unless noted)
- 2007: Miami Springs (FL) (asst)
- 2008–2009: Coral Gables (FL) Senior (AHC)
- 2010–2013: Hialeah (FL)
- 2014–2018: ASA College
- 2019–present: Bethune–Cookman

Head coaching record
- Overall: 189–177 (NCAA); 58–68 (NJCAA)
- Tournaments: NCAA: 0–2

Accomplishments and honors

Championships
- 2x SWAC (2025, 2026); SWAC tournament (2025)

Awards
- 2× SWAC Coach of the Year (2025, 2026)

Jonathan Damian Hernandez (born July 18, 1985) is an American baseball coach, who is the current head baseball coach of the Bethune–Cookman Wildcats. He was the head coach for the ASA College Silver Storm (2014–2018).

== Early life ==
Hernandez attended Hialeah High School, where he was a member of the baseball team. He helped guide the team to back-to-back state championships in 2001 and 2002.

== Coaching career ==
Hernandez spent seasons as an assistant baseball coach at Miami Springs High School and Coral Gables Senior High School before landing his first ever head coaching job with the Hialeah High School. In 2014, Hernandez was named the first ever head coach at ASA College's Miami branch. On August 14, 2018, Hernandez was named the head coach of the Bethune–Cookman Wildcats baseball program. Following a 17–38 season in 2019, Hernandez was able to land the 59th ranked recruiting class.

== Head coaching record ==
Record table
Season	Team	Overall	Conference	Standing	Postseason
ASA College Miami Silver Storm (Region XV Conference) (2014–2018)
2014	ASA College Miami				
2015	ASA College Miami	15–19			
2016	ASA College Miami				
2017	ASA College Miami	20–24	4–3		
2018	ASA College Miami	23–25	1–2		
ASA College Miami:		58–68	5–5		
Bethune–Cookman Wildcats (Mid-Eastern Athletic Conference) (2019–2021)
2019	Bethune–Cookman	17–38	10–14	T-3rd (Southern)	
2020	Bethune–Cookman	6–12	0–0		Season canceled due to COVID-19
2021	Bethune–Cookman	0–0	0–0		School withdrew from sports for the season due to COVID-19
Bethune–Cookman:			10–14		
Bethune–Cookman Wildcats (Southwestern Athletic Conference) (2022–present)
2022	Bethune–Cookman	27–32	19–11	2nd (East)	SWAC Tournament
2023	Bethune–Cookman	33–27	20–9	2nd (East)	SWAC Tournament
2024	Bethune–Cookman	32–27	19–10	2nd (East)	SWAC Tournament
2025	Bethune–Cookman	37–23	24–5	1st	NCAA Regional
2026	Bethune–Cookman	37–18	23–7	1st	
Bethune–Cookman:		189–177	109–42		
Total:		189–177			
National champion Postseason invitational champion Conference regular season champion Conference regular season and conference tournament champion Division regular season champion Division regular season and conference tournament champion Conference tournament champion

== See also ==
- List of current NCAA Division I baseball coaches
