= Torii Hunter Baseball Complex =

Baseball park in Pine Bluff, Arkansas, U.S.

- Interactive map of Torii Hunter Baseball Complex
- Location: Pine Bluff, AR 71602
- Coordinates: 34.254381°N 92.017371°W
- Owner: University of Arkansas at Pine Bluff
- Operator: University of Arkansas at Pine Bluff
- Capacity: 1,000
- Surface: Grass
- Scoreboard: Electronic
- Field size: Left Field: 331 feet (101 m); Center Field: 401 feet (122 m); Right Field: 331 feet (101 m)

Construction
- Built: 2010
- Opened: 2011
- Expanded: 2018
- Cost: $800,000
- General contractors: Moser Construction, LLC

Tenant
- Arkansas–Pine Bluff Golden Lions baseball (NCAA DI SWAC) (2011–present)

Torii Hunter Baseball Complex is a baseball venue in Pine Bluff, Arkansas, United States. It is home to the Arkansas–Pine Bluff Golden Lions baseball team of the NCAA Division I Southwestern Athletic Conference. The facility has a capacity of 1,000 spectators and is named for Torii Hunter, the head benefactor and hometown supporter. On August 31, 2018, the University broke ground on the completion of the concessions pavilion and press box.

== History ==
On August 31, 2018, the University broke ground on a press box and concessions pavilion, aided by another $250,000 donation from Hunter and Simmons Bank.

== Features ==
The field's features include a grass playing surface, a press box, an electronic scoreboard, dugouts, a brick backstop, restrooms, and concessions. The press box, restrooms and concessions were finished prior to the start of the 2019 season.

== See also ==
- List of NCAA Division I baseball venues
