= Chris Crenshaw =

American baseball player & coach (born 1986)

Current position
- Title: Head coach
- Team: Southern
- Conference: SWAC
- Record: 117-143

Biographical details
- Born: March 19, 1986 (age 40); Memphis, Tennessee, U.S.

Playing career
- 2006: Southwest Tennessee C. C.
- 2007: Southern
- 2008–2009: Bethel (TN)
- Position: Pitcher

Coaching career (HC unless noted)
- 2012-2013: Southwest Tennessee C. C. (RC/P)
- 2013-2018: Jackson State (RC/P)
- 2019–2020: Southern (P/RC)
- 2021–present: Southern

Head coaching record
- Overall: 117-143
- Tournaments: NCAA: 0–2

Accomplishments and honors

Championships
- SWAC Tournament (2014)(2019)(2021); SWAC Eastern Division (2017) SWAC Western Division (2019)(2022)

Chris Crenshaw (March 19, 1986) is an American baseball coach and former pitcher, who is the current head baseball coach of the Southern Jaguars. He played college baseball at Southwest Tennessee Community College in 2006, Southern for coach Roger Cador in 2007 and at Bethel University (Tennessee) from 2008 to 2009.

== Playing career ==
Originally from Memphis, Tennessee, Crenshaw attended Germantown High School in Germantown, Tennessee. Upon graduation, Crenshaw attended Southwest Tennessee Community College where he pitched for the Saluqis in 2006. He pitched to a 5–0 record while recording 2.83 ERA in 54 innings. He transferred to Southern University following his freshman year. In 2007, Crenshaw threw 21 innings of 3.43 ERA baseball for the Jaguars. Crenshaw then transferred to Bethel University in Tennessee and finished his playing career with the Bethel Wildcats.

== Coaching career ==
Crenshaw starting his coaching career as the recruiting coordinator and pitching coach for Southwest Tennessee. Crenshaw moved on to become the recruiting coordinator and pitching coach for the Jackson State Tigers.

On December 3, 2020, Crenshaw was named the interim head coach of Southern.

== Head coaching record ==
Record table
Season	Team	Overall	Conference	Standing	Postseason
Southern Jaguars (Southwestern Athletic Conference) (2021–present)
2021	Southern	20–30	13–11	3rd (West)	NCAA Regional
2022	Southern	27–31	21–9	1st (West)	SWAC tournament
2023	Southern	23–28	17–10	2nd (West)	SWAC tournament
2024	Southern	22-29	15–12	4th (West)	SWAC tournament
2025	Southern	25-25	16–12	6th	SWAC tournament
Southern:		117-143	82–54		
Total:		117-143			
National champion Postseason invitational champion Conference regular season champion Conference regular season and conference tournament champion Division regular season champion Division regular season and conference tournament champion Conference tournament champion
