= John W. Tankersley Field =

Baseball venue in Prairie View, Texas, US

- Interactive map of John W. Tankersley Field
- Location: 100 University Dr. Prairie View, TX, 77445
- Coordinates: 30.089932°N 95.995686°W
- Owner: Prairie View A&M University
- Operator: Prairie View A&M University
- Capacity: 512
- Surface: Grass
- Scoreboard: Electronic
- Field size: Left Field: 330 feet (100 m); Center Field: 404 feet (123 m); Right Field: 330 feet (100 m)

Construction
- Renovated: 2013
- Architect: Brown Reynolds Watford Architects
- Project manager: SSC Service Solutions
- General contractors: CME Builders & Engineers, Inc.

Tenant
- Prairie View A&M Panthers baseball (NCAA DI SWAC) (2011–present)

John W. Tankersley Field is a baseball venue in Prairie View, Texas, United States. It is home to the Prairie View A&M Panthers baseball team of the NCAA Division I Southwestern Athletic Conference. The facility has a capacity of 512 spectators and is named for John Tankersley, who was the head coach of the Panthers from 1969 to 1972 and again from 1975 to 2002.

== Features ==
The field's features include a grass playing surface, a press box, an electronic scoreboard, dugouts, a brick backstop, restrooms, and concessions.

== See also ==
- List of NCAA Division I baseball venues
