= 2022 Southwestern Athletic Conference baseball tournament =

- Teams: 8
- Format: Double elimination
- Finals site: Regions Field; Birmingham, Alabama
- Television: ESPN3

2022 Southwestern Athletic Conference baseball standings
	Conf.						Overall
Team	W		L		T	PCT	W		L		T	PCT
East
Alabama State ^{x}‍†‍‡‍^{y}	21	–	8	–	0	.724	34	–	23	–	0	.596
Bethune–Cookman ‍‍‍	20	–	11	–	0	.645	28	–	32	–	0	.467
Florida A&M ‍‍‍	19	–	11	–	0	.633	29	–	30	–	0	.492
Jackson State ‍‍‍	16	–	14	–	0	.533	29	–	27	–	0	.518
Alabama A&M ‍‍‍	11	–	19	–	0	.367	15	–	34	–	0	.306
Mississippi Valley State ‍‍‍	4	–	24	–	0	.143	10	–	30	–	1	.256
West
Southern ^{x}‍‍‍	21	–	9	–	0	.700	27	–	31	–	0	.466
Grambling State ‍‍‍	20	–	10	–	0	.667	26	–	31	–	0	.456
Texas Southern ‍‍‍	19	–	11	–	0	.633	28	–	25	–	0	.528
Prairie View A&M ‍‍‍	19	–	11	–	0	.633	30	–	27	–	0	.526
Arkansas–Pine Bluff ‍‍‍	9	–	21	–	0	.300	13	–	36	–	1	.270
Alcorn State ‍‍‍	2	–	28	–	0	.067	2	–	39	–	0	.049
x – Division champion † – Conference champion ‡ – Tournament champion y – Invited to the NCAA tournament Rankings from Collegiate Baseball

The 2022 Southwestern Athletic Conference baseball tournament was held place at Regions Field in Birmingham, Alabama from May 25 through 29. The winner of the tournament earned the conference's automatic bid to the 2022 NCAA Division I baseball tournament.

== Seeding and format ==
The four eligible teams in each division will be seeded one through four, with the top seed from each division facing the fourth seed from the opposite division in the first round, and so on. The teams then play a two bracket, double-elimination tournament with a one-game final between the winners of each bracket.

== Bracket ==
First round
1E	Alabama State	4
4W	Texas Southern	3
2W	Grambling State	3
3E	Bethune–Cookman	4
2W	Grambling State	14
4W	Texas Southern	5
1W	Southern	8
4E	Jackson State	7
2E	Florida A&M	5
3W	Prairie View A&M	4
4E	Jackson State	3
3W	Prairie View A&M	6

Second round
1E	Alabama State	8
3E	Bethune–Cookman	7
2W	Grambling State	0
3E	Bethune Cookman	19^{7}
1W	Southern	8
2E	Florida A&M	7
3W	Prairie View A&M	1
2E	Florida A&M	17^{7}

Semifinals
1E	Alabama State	4
3E	Bethune Cookman	1
1W	Southern	7	10
2E	Florida A&M	11	2

Finals
1E	Alabama State	6^{14}
1W	Southern	5

== Schedule ==
Game	Time*	Matchup^{#}	Score
First Round - Double Elimination
Wednesday, May 25
1	12:30 p.m.	No. 2E Florida A&M vs. No. 3W Prairie View A&M	5-4
2	5:15 p.m.	No. 2W Grambling State vs. No. 3E Bethune–Cookman	3-4
Thursday, May 26
3	3:00 p.m.	No. 1W Southern vs. No. 4E Jackson State	
4	30 minutes after Game 3 ends	No. 1E Alabama State vs. No. 4W Texas Southern	
5	30 minutes after Game 4 ends	Loser Game 1 No. 3W Prairie View A&M vs. Loser Game 3 Elimination Game	
Friday, May 27
6	9:00 a.m.	Loser Game 2 No. 2W Grambling State vs. Loser Game 4 Elimination Game	
7	9:00 a.m.	Winner Game 1 No. 2E Florida A&M vs. Winner Game 3	
8	12:00 p.m.	Winner Game 2 No. 3E Bethune–Cookman vs. Winner Game 4	
9	3:00 p.m.	Winner Game 5 vs. Loser Game 7 Elimination Game	
10	6:00 p.m.	Winner Game 6 vs. Loser Game 8 Elimination Game	
Saturday, May 28
11	TBD	Winner Game 7 vs. Winner Game 9	
12	TBD	Winner Game 8 vs. Winner Game 10	
11b	TBD	Winner Game 11 vs. Loser Game 11 If Necessary	
12b	TBD	Winner Game 12 vs. Loser Game 12 If Necessary	
Championship - Sunday, May 29
13	12 p.m.	Winner Game 11 vs. Winner Game 12	
*Game times in CDT. # – Rankings denote tournament seed.
