= Candy Robinson =

American baseball player & coach (1940–2011)

Biographical details
- Born: February 29, 1940
- Died: February 15, 2011 (aged 70); Houston, Texas, U.S.
- Education: Grambling College

Playing career
- 1961–1964: Grambling
- 1967: Rock Hill Indians
- 1968: Greenwood Braves
- Position: Pitcher

Coaching career (HC unless noted)
- 1986–1989: Texas Southern (assistant)
- 1990–2008: Texas Southern

Head coaching record
- Overall: 332-571-2

Accomplishments and honors

Championships
- 2× SWAC Tournament (2004, 2008)

Awards
- NAIA All-American (1964)

Candy Robinson, Jr. (February 24, 1940 – February 15, 2011) was an American baseball coach and former pitcher. He played college baseball at Grambling State for head coach Ralph Waldo Emerson Jones from 1961 to 1964 before playing in Minor League Baseball (MiLB) from 2 years from 1967 to 1968. He then served as head coach of the Texas Southern Tigers (1990–2008). On February 15, 2011, Robinson died from cancer.
