= Roger Cador =

American college baseball coach (1952–2026)

- Cador in 2021

Biographical details
- Born: January 30, 1952; New Roads, Louisiana, U.S.
- Died: June 30, 2026 (aged 74); Baton Rouge, Louisiana, U.S.

Playing career
- 1970–1973: Southern
- Position: OF

Coaching career (HC unless noted)

Baseball
- 1978: Southern (asst.)
- 1985–2017: Southern

Basketball
- 1980–1984: Southern (Asst.)

Head coaching record
- Overall: 913–597–1 (.604)

Accomplishments and honors

Championships
- 14 conference & 2 black national

Roger Cador (January 30, 1952 – June 30, 2026) was an American college baseball coach who served as head coach of the Southern Jaguars baseball team. He was named to that position prior to the 1985 season. He was also a member of a Major League Baseball task force to improve African-American participation in baseball.

== Playing career ==
Cador played baseball and basketball at Southern, leading the Jaguars in hitting in his junior season of 1972 at .393. He would be drafted by the Atlanta Braves in the 10th round of the 1973 MLB draft and play five seasons in the Braves organization, reaching Class-AAA in his final season of 1977 as an outfielder.

== Coaching career ==
Cador returned to Southern in 1978 as an assistant baseball coach. He moved to assistant basketball coach of the Jaguars in 1980, where he remained four seasons before earning the head coaching job of the baseball team in 1985. Cador's accomplishments include conference championships, 13 SWAC Coach of the Year awards, NCAA regional appearances, and three NCAA play-in appearances. Cador also produced 35 players who played professional, or became coaches, umpires, or scouts, including 23 players drafted from 2001–2004.

He told a story that when he took over as head coach, the Jaguars had virtually no equipment or facilities. He arranged a scrimmage with the Braves, then managed by his friend Dusty Baker, and returned to Baton Rouge with a truck full of equipment for his team. He also spearheaded efforts to build an on-campus stadium, complete with lights, and ground was recently broken on a facility to house space exclusively for the Jaguars baseball team. To increase exposure, he organized the Urban Invitational featuring Historically Black Colleges and Universities televised on MLB Network.

Cador completed his career at Southern with 14 SWAC titles, 11 NCAA tournament appearances, and two black national titles (in 2003 and 2005). He also held the distinctions of having coached the first Golden Spikes Award winner and Dick Howser Trophy to have played at a predominantly black school (Rickie Weeks Jr. in 2003) and the first NCAA Division I tournament game win by a black school.

He was inducted in to the National College Baseball Hall of Fame in 2022.

== Death ==
Cador's death at the age of 74 was announced on June 30, 2026. He died at his sister's home in Baton Rouge, two years after having undergone surgery for a brain tumor.

== See also ==
- List of current NCAA Division I baseball coaches
