= Robert Braddy =

American baseball player and coach

Biographical details
- Born: January 9, 1941 (age 85); Florence, Mississippi, U.S.
- Education: Jackson State University

Playing career
- 1961–1964: Jackson State
- Position: Pitcher

Coaching career (HC unless noted)
- 1973–2000: Jackson State

Administrative career (AD unless noted)
- 2006–2011: Jackson State

Head coaching record
- Overall: 824–546 (.601)
- Tournaments: NCAA: 0–8
- College Baseball Hall of Fame; Inducted in 2016

Robert L. Braddy Sr. (born January 9, 1941) is an American college baseball coach who spent 27 years as the coach for Jackson State University.

== Career ==
Braddy is from Florence, Mississippi. He attended Jackson State University and played college baseball for the Jackson State Tigers. He became the head coach of the Tigers in 1973. Braddy coached the Tigers to a 824–546 (.601) win–loss record, establishing a new Southwestern Athletic Conference (SWAC) record for wins. Braddy's teams also won 12 SWAC championships and reached the NCAA Division I baseball tournament three times. Braddy stepped down as head coach after the 2000 season, and served as athletic director until 2011.

Jackson State named their baseball field Braddy Field in his honor in 2009. Braddy was elected to the American Baseball Coaches Association Hall of Fame in 2003, the National College Baseball Hall of Fame in 2016, and the Mississippi Sports Hall of Fame in 2017.
