= Wilbert Ellis =

American baseball coach

Wilbert Ellis is an American baseball coach. A native of Ruston, Louisiana, Ellis was inducted into the American Baseball Coaches Association (ABCA) Hall of Fame for his accomplishments to the game of baseball on and off the diamond.

== History ==
Following his mentor, Ralph Waldo Emerson Jones, both the Grambling State University president and the head baseball coach from 1936 to 1977, Ellis led the Grambling Tigers to three SWAC Championships. He also guided the Tigers to three NCAA Tournament appearances en route to a 737–463–1 career record. Ellis has worn several hats over the course of his career. While at Grambling State University, Ellis served as head baseball coach along with a stint as athletic director and assistant AD. Ellis is also active during the NCAA Baseball Championships, having served as tournament director for both the Regional and Super Regional tournaments. He also hosts a youth clinic annually in Omaha, Nebraska, during the College Baseball Word Series. Due to his tireless efforts in working with all youth, the Great Plains Black History Museum in Omaha established the Coach Wilbert Ellis "Service to Youth, Sports, Health and Wellness award in 2012. The award is presented annually during the College World Series. In addition to serving as chairman of the Friends of the Eddie Robinson Museum Commission, Ellis is very active in his local church, Zion Travelers Baptist Church. Ellis was succeeded as head coach by his former assistant James "Sap" Randle, and current coach Barret Ray. Some of his most notable players are Courtney Mitchell, Wesley Marshall, Andre LeGrier, Courtne Duncan and Leonard Webster.
