= Southern Jaguars baseball =

Southern Jaguars
- 2026 Southern Jaguars baseball team
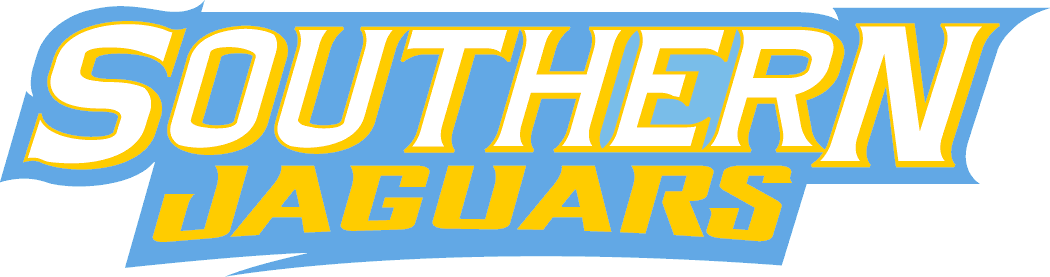
- Founded: Program discontinued after 1931 season but revived in 1948
- University: Southern University
- Head coach: Chris Crenshaw (6th season)
- Conference: SWAC; Western Division
- Location: Baton Rouge, Louisiana
- Home stadium: Lee–Hines Stadium (capacity: 1,500)
- Nickname: Jaguars
- Colors: Columbia blue and gold

College World Series champions
- none, but won 1 NAIA national championship (1959) and 2 blackcollegebaseball.com & 1 blackcollegenines.com black national championships (2003, 2005, 2019)

NCAA tournament appearances
- 1987, 1988, 1991, 1992, 1993, 1996, 1997, 1998, 1999, 2001, 2002, 2003, 2006, 2009, 2019, 2021

Conference tournament champions
- 1979, 1981, 1987, 1988, 1991, 1992, 1993, 1996, 1997, 1998, 1999, 2001,2002, 2003, 2006, 2009,

Conference regular season champions
- 27 official (1959, 1960, 1965, 1966, 1969, 1970, 1972, 1974, 1975, 1976, 1979, 1981, 1987, 1988, 1991, 1992, 1993, 1996, 1997, 1998, 1999, 2001, 2002, 2003, 2005, 2009, 2019) and 4 unofficial (1949, 1950, 1955, 1956) SWAC championships

The Southern Jaguars baseball team is a varsity intercollegiate athletic team of Southern University in Baton Rouge, Louisiana, United States. The team is a member of the Southwestern Athletic Conference, which is part of the National Collegiate Athletic Association's Division I. The team plays its home games at Lee–Hines Stadium in Baton Rouge, Louisiana.

== Background ==
The Jaguars have more SWAC titles than any school. They also have more national and black national titles than any SWAC school. Though Southern was forced to discontinue its baseball program during the uncertain times of the Great Depression and World War II years (specifically from 1932 to 1947), its program was largely stable in the subsequent post-war decades; only four head coaches coached Southern between 1949 and 2017.

In 1959 Southern, led by future National Baseball Hall of Famer Lou Brock, became the first historically black college or university (HBCU) to win the National Association of Intercollegiate Athletics national championship. In 1987 Southern became the first HBCU to win a game in an NCAA Division I regional tournament by defeating #2-ranked Cal State Fullerton. In 1996 Southern became the first HBCU to win a game in an NCAA Division I play-in series by defeating Austin Peay. In 2003 and 2005, Southern won blackcollegebaseball.com black national championships; in 2019 Southern won a third black national championship, this time designated by blackcollegenines.com, for its Large School Division.

== Southern in the NCAA Tournament ==
Year	Record	Pct	Notes
2019	0–2	.000	Starkville Regional
2021	0–2	.000	Austin Regional
TOTALS	0–4	.000	

== Head coaches ==
Robert Henry ("Bob") Lee, a graduate of LeMoyne College, served as head coach between 1949 and 1962, before moving on to become coach of the football team. He compiled a 207–51 (.802) overall record as baseball coach. In addition to coaching Brock and the 1959 team to an NAIA national title, he also led the Jaguars to the 1960 NAIA World Series and 2 official and 4 unofficial SWAC titles (for the 1949, 1950, 1955, and 1956 seasons). The Jaguars' baseball stadium is named in part for him.

Emory Wellington Hines, a Texas College alum who had coached the football teams of Grambling State—before the famed Eddie Robinson had assumed the reigns—as well as Samuel Huston College, served as Southern's baseball coach between 1963 and 1976. He led the Jaguars to 2 NAIA Area 5 titles—World Series appearances, 4 NAIA District titles, 9 NAIA District tournaments, 1 NCAA Division II tournament, and 8 SWAC titles. He finished his career at Southern with a 373–130–1 (.741) record. His most noteworthy player may have been Danny Goodwin, the only player to have ever been drafted first overall in two Major League Baseball drafts and the first documented Southern player to win a national college baseball player of the year award (from the Sporting News, in 1975). The Jaguars' baseball stadium was later named in part for Hines.

When Southern's athletic director had to step away from his service due to surgery, Hines was promoted in his place, and Hines recommended that Southern alum and assistant coach Lee Flentroy replace him as acting coach.

Southern alum Leroy Boyd later served as acting coach once the 1977 season began and was then promoted to permanent coach after the season—a title that he held through 1984. He led the Jaguars to 6 SWAC West titles, 2 SWAC titles, 3 NAIA District tournaments, and a 255–157–4 record, for a .618 winning percentage. His most prominent player may have been Reggie Williams.

The Jaguars were most recently led by head coach and Southern alumnus Roger Cador. He completed his coaching career, which spanned from 1985 to 2017, with a 913 wins, 597 losses, and 3 ties (.604), 22 SWAC West titles, 14 SWAC titles, 8 NCAA Division I tournament appearances, 3 NCAA Division I tournament play-in appearances, and 2 blackcollegebaseball.com HBCU national titles. He also holds the distinction of having coached the first HBCU player to win a Baseball America College Player of the Year Award, Collegiate Baseball Player of the Year award, Dick Howser Trophy, Golden Spikes Award, or Rotary Smith Award (Rickie Weeks Jr., in 2003). Cador struggled with health concerns during his later seasons and, due to issues with his pacemaker, the final three weeks of the 2010 season had to be coached by acting head coach Fernando Puebla—although the results of those games are officially credited to Cador (Puebla himself later had issues acquiring full U.S. citizenship and had to step down from the coaching staff shortly before the start of the 2014 season, resulting in Cador assuming additional coaching duties as the season approached). Cador later suffered from a bout of pneumonia late in the 2017 season, and assistant coach Dan Canevari filled in for him as acting head coach while Cador recovered.

Due to poor record-keeping by athletic department personnel between 2010 and 2015, 218 student athletes from 15 sports teams at Southern were linked to rules infractions by the NCAA; it is not immediately clear how many, if any, of Cador's 137 wins from that time period may have been vacated by the NCAA. However, with various unresolved Academic Progress Rate issues, the NCAA limited recruiting efforts, scholarship awards, practice time, and postseason participation for the incoming head coach.

On July 26, 2017 Southern announced the hiring of Kerrick Jackson as coach. He attended St. Louis Community College–Meramec and then Bethune–Cookman, but later transferred to Nebraska. He led Southern to a 9–33 (.214) record in his first season at the helm. His second team went 32–24 (.571), won the SWAC Western Division, the SWAC, the blackcollegenines.com Large School Division HBCU national championship, and qualified for the BCSG 360 HBCU World Series (which was later canceled due to inclement weather). Southern also made a return to the NCAA tournament. His third team was 6–10 when the NCAA canceled all spring sports competition due to the COVID-19 pandemic. Jackson resigned on November 30, 2020, and Chris Crenshaw was named the interim head coach.

Since 1949 (when Lee became coach) and through the 2019 season, the team's overall record is 1,795–1,002–8 (.641) on the field—before any wins from 2010 to 2015 that may have been vacated by the NCAA are factored in.

Southern Jaguar Head Coaches (since 1949 only)
No.	Name (alma mater)	Seasons	Games	Won	Lost	Tied	Percentage
1	Bob Lee (LeMoyne College)	1949–1962	258	207	51	0	.802
2	Emory Hines (Texas College)	1963–1976	504	373	130	1	.741
3	Lee Flentroy* (Southern)	—	—	—	—	—	—
4	Leroy Boyd* (Southern)	1977–1984	416	255	157	4	.618
5	Roger Cador (Southern)	1985–2017	1,513	913**	597	3	.604
6	Kerrick Jackson (Nebraska)	2018–2020	114	47	67	0	.412
1	Chris Crenshaw (Bethel (TN))	2021–present	210	92	118	0	.438
Totals	7 coaches	75 years	3,007	1,887**	1,120	8	.627

Notes: *—Flentroy served as acting head coach between the 1976 and 1977 seasons, and Boyd served as acting head coach during the 1977 season; **—up to 137 wins between 2010 and 2015 are subject to be vacated by the NCAA (it is not yet clear how many, if any, of these wins included ineligible players)

== Teams ==
Southern Jaguar Season Records (since 1974 only)
Season	Overall	Conference	Note(s)
Emory Hines (Southwestern Athletic Conference) (1963–1976)
1974	28–16	14–4	SWAC champ, NAIA District participant
1975	33–8	14–3	SWAC champ, NCAA Division II Regional participant
1976	21–21–1	13–4	SWAC champ, NAIA District participant
Leroy Boyd (Southwestern Athletic Conference) (1977–1981)
1977	29–16–1	8–2	SWAC West champ, NAIA District participant
1978	42–29	11–1	SWAC West champ, NAIA District participant
1979	32–16–1	10–0	SWAC West champ, SWAC champ, NAIA District participant
1980	32–17–2	8–3–1	SWAC West champ
1981	41–20	11–6	SWAC champ
1982	25–24	13–4	SWAC West champ
1983	26–15*	13–5*	
1984	28–20	14–4	SWAC West champ
Roger Cador (Southwestern Athletic Conference) (1985–2017)
1985	21–24	11–5	
1986	22–26–1	14–6	SWAC West champ
1987	31–22	20–4	SWAC West champ, SWAC champ, NCAA Division I Regional participant
1988	28–21	16–8	SWAC champ, NCAA Division I Regional participant
1989	17–24	13–11	
1990	26–17	17–5	SWAC West champ
1991	31–12	17–3	SWAC West champ, SWAC champ
1992	31–12	19–5	SWAC West champ, SWAC champ
1993	24–14	12–6	SWAC co-champ
1994	30–14–1	18–6	SWAC West champ
1995	29–12	21–3	SWAC West champ
1996	34–7	18–2	SWAC West champ, SWAC champ, NCAA Division I Play-in participant
1997	32–17	21–3	SWAC West champ, SWAC champ, NCAA Division I Play-in participant
1998	31–16	22–4	SWAC West champ, SWAC champ, NCAA Division I Play-in participant
1999	29–16	23–7	SWAC West champ, SWAC champ, NCAA Division I Regional participant
2000	30–16	21–8	SWAC West champ
2001	43–12	28–4	SWAC West champ, SWAC champ, NCAA Division I Regional participant
2002	45–10	27–3	SWAC West champ, SWAC champ, NCAA Division I Regional participant
2003	44–7	31–1	SWAC West champ, SWAC champ, NCAA Division I Regional participant, blackcollegebaseball.com HBCU national champ
2004	26–14	19–7	SWAC West champ
2005	29–18	17–7	SWAC West co-champ, SWAC champ, NCAA Division I Regional participant, blackcollegebaseball.com HBCU national co-champ
2006	26–20	17–8	
2007	26–18	15–9	
2008	28–18	18–6	SWAC West champ
2009	30–17	17–6	SWAC West champ, SWAC champ, NCAA Division I Regional participant
2010	24–22–1**	16–6–1**	
2011	29–19**	16–8**	SWAC West champ
2012	33–16**	17–7**	SWAC West champ
2013	21–23**	14–10**	SWAC West champ
2014	10–26**	6–16**	
2015	20–23**	13–8**	
2016	14–32	6–14	
2017	17–27	10–14	
Kerrick Jackson (Southwestern Athletic Conference) (2018–2020)
2018	9–33	6–15	§
2019	32–24	18–6	SWAC West champ, SWAC champ, BCSG 360 HBCU World Series qualifier†, NCAA Division I Regional participant, blackcollegenines.com Large School; Division HBCU national champ
2020	6–10	3–0	‡
National title	Conference title	Conference division title	

Notes: *—total includes game forfeited by Prairie View A&M, due to the use of an ineligible player; **—up to 137 wins between 2010 and 2015 are subject to be vacated by the NCAA (it is not yet clear how many, if any, of these wins included ineligible players); §—team ineligible for postseason play, due to a violation of NCAA rules concerning Academic Progress Rate scores; †—game canceled, due to inclement weather; ‡—season canceled by NCAA due to COVID-19 pandemic

== Players ==
In 1985 Brock was inducted into the National Baseball Hall of Fame and Museum. In 2011 Goodwin became the first former HBCU player inducted into the National College Baseball Hall of Fame, and in 2012 Brock became the second.

=== Major League Baseball ===
Southern has had 96 Major League Baseball draft selections since the draft began in 1965.

Jaguars in the Major League Baseball Draft
Year	Player	Round	Team
1965	Lionel Jones	54	Astros
1965	Ray Frank	35	Orioles
1965	Elvatous Peters	27	White Sox
1965	John Hairston	16	Cubs
1965	Peter Barnes	6	Dodgers
1966	Elvatous Peters	12	Cubs
1966	Lionel Jones	9	Senators
1967	Arthur Ganious	7	Tigers
1967	James Herbert	2	Dodgers
1969	Jake Brown	1	Giants
1969	Arthur Ganious	17	Cubs
1970	Henry Baker	2	White Sox
1970	Jimmie Collins	15	White Sox
1970	Lee Richard	1	White Sox
1971	Henry Baker	3	Red Sox
1971	Oscar Fisher	30	Angels
1971	Bobby Johnson	27	Dodgers
1971	Jimmie Collins	4	Braves
1971	Henry Baker	3	Phillies
1973	Roger Cador	10	Braves
1974	Dale Brock	21	Rangers
1974	Alvin Harper	5	Dodgers
1975	Joe Pittman	5	Astros
1975	Danny Goodwin	1	Angels
1975	Dale Brock	3	Twins
1977	Calvin King	22	Mariners
1977	Carl Spikes	7	Cubs
1977	Raymond Lewis	4	Mets
1978	Keith Shellings	20	Rangers
1979	Michael Woods	18	Giants
1980	Greg Smith	13	Dodgers
1980	Otis Tramble	10	Mets
1981	Charles Dinkins	22	Brewers
1981	Otis Tramble	18	Cubs
1981	Reggie Williams	6	Cardinals
1982	Reggie Williams	13	Dodgers
1983	Christopher Chapman	19	Dodgers
1983	DeMarlo Hale	17	Red Sox
1986	Trent Hubbard	12	Astros
1987	Raymond Payton	19	White Sox
1988	Marco Paddy	56	Braves
1988	Brian Cornelius	41	Orioles
1988	Tim Stargell	33	Mariners
1988	James Garrett	31	White Sox
1988	Adell Davenport	18	Giants
1989	Brian Cornelius	43	Tigers
1989	Horace Gaither	39	White Sox
1989	Tyrone Washington	23	Rangers
1990	Roosevelt Smith	30	White Sox
1990	Jonathan Story	25	White Sox
1991	Grady Davidson	22	Indians
1991	Kenny Winzer	17	Mariners
1992	Derrick Calvin	31	Braves
1993	Ronald Smith	27	Cubs
1993	Derrick Calvin	21	Rockies
1994	Clarence Johns	55	Cardinals
1994	Dwaine Edgar	15	Yankees
1995	Bryan Graves	20	Angels
1996	Craig Quintal	8	Tigers
1997	Tom Williams	18	White Sox
1998	Terry Hill	18	Red Sox
1999	Alva Thompson	24	Braves
2000	Melvin Anderson	24	Phillies
2001	Torik Harrison	33	Marlins
2001	Franco Blackburn	27	Marlins
2001	Marcus Chandler	17	Royals
2001	Michael Woods	1	Tigers
2002	Eric Thomas	28	Brewers
2002	Dewon Day	26	Blue Jays
2002	Carl Primus	23	Marlins
2002	Fred Lewis	2	Giants
2003	Fernando Puebla	29	Devil Rays
2003	Antoin Gray	25	White Sox
2003	Kevin Vital	18	Astros
2003	Marcus Townsend	14	Reds
2003	Damian Ursin	8	Reds
2003	Rickie Weeks	1	Brewers
2004	Marcus Townsend	31	Diamondbacks
2004	Alfred Ard	30	Indians
2004	Matt Paul	18	Dodgers
2004	Vince Davis	18	Diamondbacks
2004	Drew Toussaint	13	Angels
2004	Jason Quarles	7	Pirates
2004	Josh Leblanc	6	Angels
2007	Jeffery McCollum	33	Nationals
2007	Roy Merritt	29	Mets
2007	Baron Short	7	Angels
2008	Calvin Anderson	12	Pirates
2009	Michael Thomas	12	Red Sox
2010	Cody Hall	35	Tigers
2011	Rodarrick Jones	37	Pirates
2011	Cody Hall	19	Giants
2011	Frazier Hall	16	Angels
2013	José De León	24	Dodgers
2015	Lance Jones	36	Blue Jays
2019	Javeyan Williams	22	Giants

== See also ==
- List of NCAA Division I baseball programs
