= Texas Southern Tigers baseball =

Texas Southern Tigers
- 2026 Texas Southern Tigers baseball team
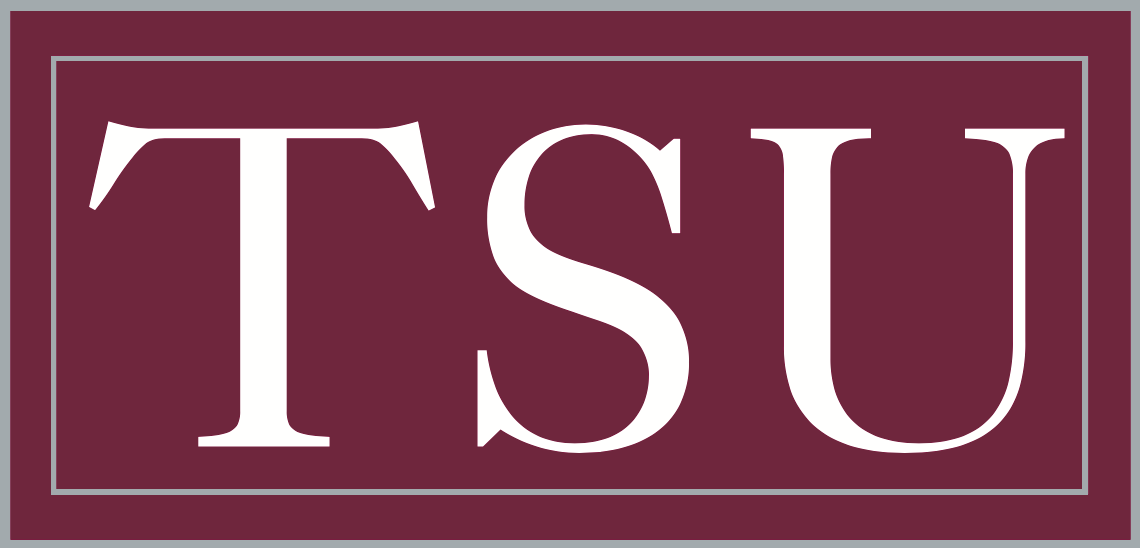
- Founded: 1965
- University: Texas Southern University
- Head coach: Michael Robertson (18th season)
- Conference: SWAC; West Division
- Location: Houston, Texas
- Home stadium: MacGregor Park
- Nickname: Tigers
- Colors: Maroon and gray

NCAA tournament appearances
- 2004, 2008, 2015, 2017, 2018

Conference tournament champions
- 2004, 2008, 2015, 2017, 2018

The Texas Southern Tigers baseball team is the varsity intercollegiate baseball program of Texas Southern University in Houston, Texas, United States. The program's first season was 1965, and it has been a member of the NCAA Division I Southwestern Athletic Conference since the start of the 1999 season. Its home venue is MacGregor Park, owned by the city of Houston. Michael Robertson is the team's head coach starting in the 2009 season. The program has appeared in 5 NCAA Tournaments. It has won five conference tournament championships and no regular season conference titles. As of the start of the 2018 Major League Baseball season, no former Tigers have appeared in Major League Baseball.

== History ==
=== Texas Southern in the NCAA Tournament ===
Year	Record	Pct	Notes
2004	1–2	.333	Houston Regional
2008	0–2	.000	Baton Rouge Regional
2015	0–2	.000	College Station Regional
2017	0–2	.000	Baton Rouge Regional
2018	0–2	.000	Austin Regional
TOTALS	1–10	.091	

=== Conference affiliations ===
- Southwestern Athletic Conference (1965–present)

== MacGregor Park ==
The MacGregor Park is a public park owned by the City of Houston. The Tigers play their home games at the park for just 20 percent of the games that the Tigers do host during a given season.

== Head coaches ==
Texas Southern's longest tenured head coach was Candy Robinson, who has coached the team from 1990 to 2008.

== See also ==
- List of NCAA Division I baseball programs
