= Prairie View A&M Panthers baseball =

Prairie View A&M Panthers
- 2026 Prairie View A&M Panthers baseball team
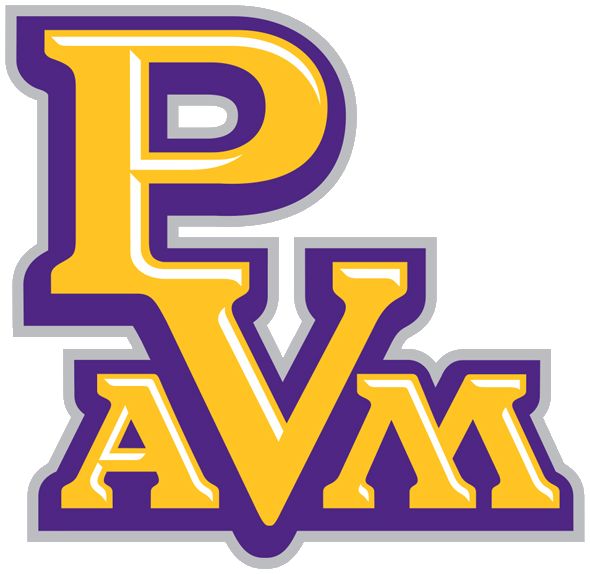
- University: Prairie View A&M University
- Head coach: Daniel Dulin (1st season)
- Conference: SWAC; West Division
- Location: Prairie View, Texas
- Home stadium: John W. Tankersley Field (Capacity: 512)
- Nickname: Panthers
- Colors: Purple and gold

NCAA tournament appearances
- 2006, 2007, 2012

Conference tournament champions
- 2006, 2007, 2012

The Prairie View A&M Panthers baseball represents Prairie View A&M University, which is located in Prairie View, Texas. The Panthers are an NCAA Division I college baseball program that competes in the Southwestern Athletic Conference.

The Prairie View A&M Panthers play all home games on campus at John W. Tankersley Field. They are under the direction of head coach Daniel Dulin who has served as head coach since the start of the 2026 season.

Since the program's inception, 3 Panthers have gone on to play in Major League Baseball.

== Prairie View A&M in the NCAA Tournament ==
Year	Record	Pct	Notes
2006	0–2	.000	Houston Regional
2007	0–2	.000	Houston Regional
2012	0–2	.000	Houston Regional
TOTALS	0–6	.000	

== Head coaches ==
Season	Coach	Years	Record	Pct.
1970–2002	John Tankersley	33	370–723–1	.339
2003–2008	Michael Robertson	6	163–171	.488
2009–2015	Waskyla Cullivan	7	149–199	.428
2016–2025	Auntwan Riggins	10	176–303	.367
Totals	4 coaches	56 seasons	858–1,396–1	.381

== Notable players ==
- Odie Davis
- Steve Henderson
- Charles Hudson
- Hilton Smith
- Robert Williams, NCAA #6 Career and Highest 4 year hitter in NCAA History

== See also ==
- List of NCAA Division I baseball programs
