= Arkansas–Pine Bluff Golden Lions baseball =

American college baseball team

Arkansas–Pine Bluff Golden Lions
- 2026 Arkansas–Pine Bluff Golden Lions baseball team
- University: University of Arkansas at Pine Bluff
- Head coach: Logan Stout (2nd season)
- Conference: SWAC; East Division
- Location: Pine Bluff, Arkansas
- Home stadium: Torii Hunter Baseball Complex (capacity: 1,000)
- Nickname: Golden Lions
- Colors: Black and gold

For information on all University of Arkansas at Pine Bluff sports, see Arkansas–Pine Bluff Golden Lions

The Arkansas–Pine Bluff Golden Lions baseball team is a varsity intercollegiate athletic team of the University of Arkansas at Pine Bluff in Pine Bluff, Arkansas, United States. The team is a member of the Southwestern Athletic Conference, which is part of the National Collegiate Athletic Association's Division I. The team plays its home games at the Torii Hunter Baseball Complex in Pine Bluff, Arkansas. The Golden Lions are coached by Logan Stout.

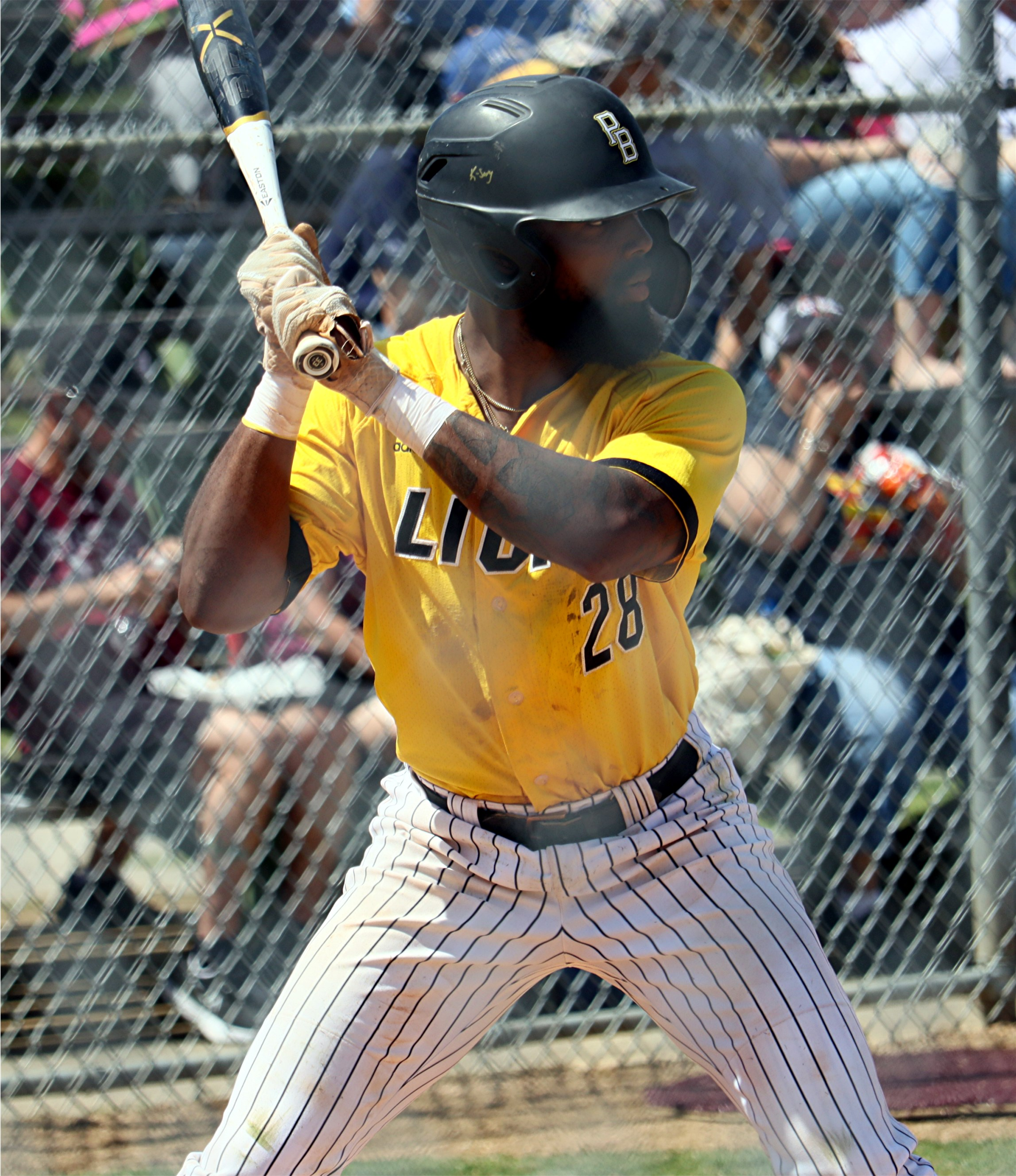
Golden Lions player Kacy Higgins at bat during a 2022 game

== Head coaches ==
Season	Coach	Years	Record	Pct.
1957–1977	Charles Spearman	21*	124–97	.561
1999–2007	Elbert Bennett	9	144–302–1	.323
2008–2010	Michael Bumpers	3	50–92	.352
2011–2024	Carlos James	14	211–415–2	.338
Totals	4 coaches	36 seasons	529–906–3	.369

- Only 10 of Spearman's 21 season's had records available

== Major League Baseball ==
Arkansas–Pine Bluff has had 6 Major League Baseball draft selections since the draft began in 1965.

Golden Lions in the Major League Baseball Draft
Year	Player	Round	Team
2002	Isiah Garner	31	Devil Rays
2009	Zachary Varnell	44	Diamondbacks
2011	Chretien Matz	44	Tigers
2014	Isias Alcantar	36	Rays
2015	Kevin Walsh	21	Phillies
2015	Byron Davis	8	Royals

== See also ==
- List of NCAA Division I baseball programs
