= Alabama State Hornets baseball =

Varsity intercollegiate baseball program

Alabama State Hornets
- 2026 Alabama State Hornets baseball team
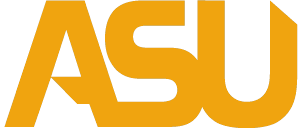
- Founded: 1926
- Conference history: Southern Intercollegiate Athletic Conference (1926–1982); Southwestern Athletic Conference (1983-present)
- University: Alabama State University
- Athletic director: Dr. Jason Cable
- Head coach: José Vázquez (10th season)
- Conference: Southwestern Athletic Conference; East Division
- Location: Montgomery, Alabama
- Home stadium: Wheeler–Watkins Baseball Complex (capacity: 500)
- Nickname: Hornets
- Colors: Black and old gold

NCAA tournament appearances
- Division II: 1974; Division I: 2016, 2022, 2026

Conference tournament champions
- 2016, 2022, 2026

Conference regular season champions
- 2016, 2022

The Alabama State Hornets baseball team is the varsity intercollegiate baseball program of Alabama State University in Montgomery, Alabama, United States. The program's first season was in 1926, and it has been a member of the NCAA Division I while competing in the Southwestern Athletic Conference (SWAC) since the start of the 1983 season. Its home venue is the Wheeler–Watkins Baseball Complex, located on Alabama State's campus. José Vázquez has been the team's head coach since the beginning of the 2017 season. The program has appeared in two NCAA tournaments. It has won two conference tournament championships and one regular season conference title. As of the start of the 2018 Major League Baseball season, one former Hornet has appeared in Major League Baseball.

== History ==
=== Early history ===
The program's first season of play was 1926.

The Hornets won their first ever SWAC title in 2016 and made their first appearance in the NCAA Division I baseball tournament, falling to #16 Florida State and South Alabama in the Tallahassee Regional. The Hornets won a second SWAC title in 2022 before bowing out to #1 Tennessee and Georgia Tech in the Knoxville Regional.

== Alabama State in the NCAA Tournament ==
Year	Record	Pct	Notes
2016	0–2	.000	Tallahassee Regional
2022	0–2	.000	Knoxville Regional
2026	0–2	.000	Tuscaloosa Regional
TOTALS	0–6	.000	

== Conference affiliations ==
- Southern Intercollegiate Athletic Conference (1926–1982)
- Southwestern Athletic Conference (1983–present)

== Wheeler–Watkins Baseball Complex ==
The venue is named for two former Alabama State baseball coaches, Herbert Wheeler and Larry Watkins. Opened in March 2011, the facility has a capacity of 500 spectators.

== Head coaches ==
Alabama State's longest tenured head coach was Larry Watkins, who coached the team from 1982 to 2011.

=== Records ===
Season	Coach	Years	Record	Pct.
1957–1981	Herbert Wheeler*	25	174–200–2	.465
1982–2011	Larry Watkins	30	482–729–6	.399
2012–2016	Mervyl Melendez	5	253–471	.349
2017–present	José Vázquez	10	295–207	.588
Totals	4 coaches	43 seasons	1,069–1,511–8	.415

*Wheeler's record only shows 17 seasons, he has 8 years with unknown records.

== Notable former players ==
Below is a list of notable former Hornets and the seasons in which they played for Alabama State.

- Harvey Branch (1957–1958)

== See also ==
- List of NCAA Division I baseball programs
