= Jackson State Tigers baseball =

Jackson State Tigers
- 2026 Jackson State Tigers baseball team
- University: Jackson State University
- Head coach: Omar Johnson (20th season)
- Conference: SWAC; East Division
- Location: Jackson, Mississippi
- Home stadium: Braddy Field (Capacity: 800)
- Nickname: Tigers
- Colors: Navy blue, white, and light blue

NCAA tournament appearances
- 2000, 2013, 2014

Conference tournament champions
- 2000, 2013, 2014

Conference regular season champions
- 1968, 1971, 1973, 1977, 1978, 1980, 1982, 1986, 1989, 1990, 1993, 1994, 1995, 2000, 2005, 2006, 2021

The Jackson State Tigers baseball represents Jackson State University, which is located in Jackson, Mississippi. The Tigers are an NCAA Division I college baseball program that competes in the Southwestern Athletic Conference.

The Jackson State Tigers play all home games on campus at Braddy Field. Under the direction of head coach Omar Johnson who has served as head coach since 2007.

Since the program's inception, 7 Tigers have gone on to play in Major League Baseball.

== Jackson State in the NCAA Tournament ==
Year	Record	Pct	Notes
2000	0–2	.000	Baton Rouge Regional
2013	0–2	.000	Baton Rouge Regional
2014	1–2	.333	Lafayette Regional
TOTALS	1–6	.143	

== Head coaches ==
Season	Coach	Years	Record	Pct.
1958–1960	A. F. Smith	3	22–30	.423
1970	Robert Hill	1	24–4	.857
1971–1972	W. C. Gorden	2	44–15	.746
1973–2000	Robert Braddy	28	811–552–5	.595
2001–2006	Mark Salter	6	147–131–1	.529
2007–present	Omar Johnson	16	574–371	.607
Totals	6 coaches	58 seasons	1,622–1,103–6	.595

== Notable players ==
- Oil Can Boyd
- Robert Braddy
- Wes Chamberlain
- Dave Clark
- Dewon Day
- Howard Farmer
- Mike Farmer
- Curt Ford
- Marvin Freeman
- Kelvin Moore

== See also ==
- List of NCAA Division I baseball programs
