= Grambling State Tigers baseball =

Collegiate baseball team

Grambling State Tigers
- 2026 Grambling State Tigers baseball team
- Founded: 1936
- University: Grambling State University
- Head coach: Davin Pierre (5th season)
- Conference: SWAC; West Division
- Location: Grambling, Louisiana
- Home stadium: Wilbert Ellis Field at Ralph Waldo Emerson Jones Park (Capacity: 1,100)
- Nickname: Tigers
- Colors: Black, gold, and red

NCAA tournament appearances
- 1983, 1984, 1985, 2010, 2024

Conference tournament champions
- 2010, 2024

Conference regular season champions
- 1961, 1962, 1963, 1964, 1967, 1983, 1984, 1985, 2010

The Grambling State Tigers baseball team is a varsity intercollegiate athletic team of Grambling State University in Grambling, Louisiana, U.S. The team is a member of the Southwestern Athletic Conference, which is part of the National Collegiate Athletic Association's Division I. The team plays its home games at Wilbert Ellis Field at Ralph Waldo Emerson Jones Park in Grambling, Louisiana. The Tigers are coached by Davin Pierre.

The program was founded by Ralph Waldo Emerson Jones, who served as the team's first head coach.

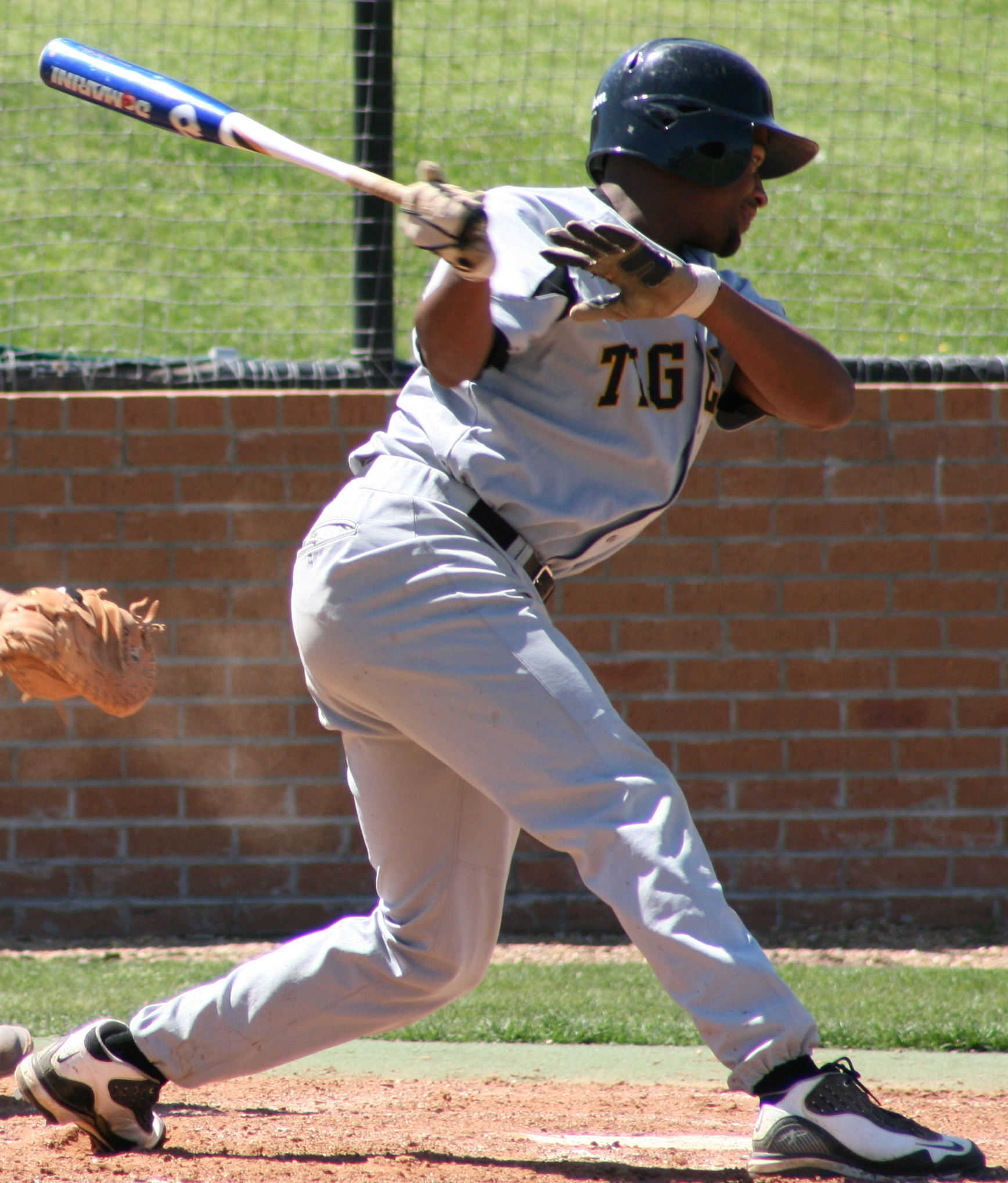
A Tigers baseball player during a game in 2009

== Grambling State in the NCAA Tournament ==
| Year | Record | Pct | Notes |
|---|---|---|---|
| 1983 | 0–2 | .000 | Central Regional |
| 1984 | 0–2 | .000 | Midwest Regional |
| 1985 | 0–2 | .000 | Central Regional |
| 2010 | 0–2 | .000 | Fayetteville Regional |
| 2024 | 0–2 | .000 | Bryan-College Station Regional |
| TOTALS | 0–10 | .000 | |

== Major League Baseball ==
Grambling State has had 50 Major League Baseball draft selections since the draft began in 1965.

Tigers in the Major League Baseball Draft
| Year | Player | Round | Team |
|---|---|---|---|
| 1965 | Bobby Jones | 34 | Orioles |
| 1965 | Jophrey Brown | 21 | Pirates |
| 1966 | Jophrey Brown | 2 | Cubs |
| 1966 | Jim Jackson | 32 | Braves |
| 1966 | Frank Patterson | 15 | Cardinals |
| 1966 | Jophrey Brown | 4 | Red Sox |
| 1967 | Jim Jackson | 1 | Cardinals |
| 1967 | Melvin McNeil | 44 | Mets |
| 1967 | Ralph Garr | 3 | Braves |
| 1967 | Frank Patterson | 5 | Braves |
| 1968 | Charlie Jones | 2 | Orioles |
| 1968 | Benjamin Williams | 21 | Reds |
| 1968 | Matt Alexander | 2 | Cubs |
| 1969 | Charlie Jones | 3 | Angels |
| 1969 | Michael Cummings | 6 | Red Sox |
| 1972 | Ed Ricks | 6 | Yankees |
| 1974 | Aaron Randall | 23 | Cubs |
| 1976 | Bobby Dupree | 23 | Padres |
| 1976 | Ronald Adkins | 7 | Orioles |
| 1976 | Reggie Baldwin | 3 | Astros |
| 1981 | Wendell Henderson | 24 | Cubs |
| 1981 | Sap Randall | 10 | Angels |
| 1981 | Kenneth Brown | 9 | Pirates |
| 1982 | Derrick Smith | 17 | Cubs |
| 1984 | Ira Tieul | 45 | Yankees |
| 1984 | Tony Bailey | 21 | Braves |
| 1984 | John Lewis | 18 | Cubs |
| 1985 | Lenny Webster | 21 | Twins |
| 1985 | Juan McWilliams | 18 | Pirates |
| 1985 | Gary Eave | 12 | Braves |
| 1986 | Olen Parker | 23 | Phillies |
| 1986 | Martin Foley | 16 | Phillies |
| 1987 | Gerald Williams | 14 | Yankees |
| 1988 | Rodney Lofton | 13 | Orioles |
| 1988 | Cedric Shaw | 12 | Rangers |
| 1988 | Dennis Walker | 11 | White Sox |
| 1989 | Landon Williams | 49 | Mariners |
| 1989 | Rico Coleman | 36 | Padres |
| 1990 | Clemente Gordon | 51 | White Sox |
| 1990 | Jeffrey Gunn | 45 | Phillies |
| 1991 | Carlton Hardy | 37 | Phillies |
| 1992 | Kevin Nails | 49 | Braves |
| 1994 | Courtney Mitchell | 36 | Phillies |
| 1996 | Courtney Duncan | 20 | Cubs |
| 2004 | James Cooper | 33 | Astros |
| 2010 | Jeremy Shelby | 38 | Orioles |
| 2011 | Eldred Barnett | 29 | Giants |
| 2012 | Chris Wolfe | 30 | Athletics |
| 2013 | Cory Jordan | 35 | Rays |
| 2015 | Edwin Drexler | 38 | Dodgers |

== See also ==
- List of NCAA Division I baseball programs
