= 2023 Mississippi Valley State Delta Devils baseball team =

American college baseball season

2023 Mississippi Valley State Delta Devils baseball
- Conference: Southwestern Athletic Conference
- West
- Record: 15–37 (7–23 SWAC)
- Head coach: Milton Barney Jr. (1st season)
- Assistant coaches: Jaylan Bledsoe (2nd season); Kenny Hudson (1st season)
- Home stadium: Magnolia Field

2023 Southwestern Athletic Conference baseball standings
| | Conf. | | | | Overall |
| Team | W | | L | PCT | W | | L | PCT |
|---|---|---|---|---|---|---|---|---|
East
| Alabama State ^{x}‍‍‍ | 26 | – | 4 | .867 | 39 | – | 15 | .722 |
| Bethune–Cookman ‍‍‍ | 20 | – | 9 | .690 | 29 | – | 25 | .537 |
| Florida A&M ‍‍‡‍^{y} | 18 | – | 12 | .600 | 24 | – | 27 | .471 |
| Jackson State ‍‍‍ | 13 | – | 17 | .433 | 26 | – | 21 | .553 |
| Mississippi Valley State ‍‍‍ | 7 | – | 23 | .233 | 15 | – | 37 | .288 |
| Alabama A&M ‍‍‍ | 5 | – | 24 | .172 | 14 | – | 34 | .292 |
West
| Grambling State ^{x}‍‍‍ | 21 | – | 7 | .750 | 27 | – | 24 | .529 |
| Texas Southern ‍‍‍ | 17 | – | 10 | .630 | 31 | – | 20 | .608 |
| Southern ‍‍‍ | 17 | – | 10 | .630 | 22 | – | 26 | .458 |
| Prairie View A&M ‍‍‍ | 14 | – | 15 | .483 | 19 | – | 35 | .352 |
| Arkansas–Pine Bluff ‍‍‍ | 10 | – | 20 | .333 | 18 | – | 33 | .353 |
| Alcorn State ‍‍‍ | 6 | – | 23 | .207 | 9 | – | 39 | .188 |
x – Division champion ‡ – Tournament champion y – Invited to the NCAA Tournament; As of May 20, 2023; Rankings from Collegiate Baseball

The 2023 Mississippi Valley State Delta Devils baseball team was a baseball team that represented the Mississippi Valley State University in the 2023 NCAA Division I baseball season. The Delta Devils were members of the Southwestern Athletic Conference and played their home games at Magnolia Field in Itta Bena, Mississippi. They were led by first-year head coach Milton Barney Jr.

== Previous season ==
The Delta Devils finished the 2022 NCAA Division I baseball season 10–31–1 overall (4–25 conference) and sixth place in the west division of the conference standings, failing to qualify for the 2022 Southwestern Athletic Conference Baseball Tournament.

== Preseason ==
On June 15, 2022, head coach Stanley Stubbs resigned due to health concerns. On August 11, 2022, Milton Barney Jr. was named the head coach of the Delta Devils.

=== Preseason SWAC poll ===
For the 2023 poll, Mississippi Valley State was projected to finish in sixth in the East Division.

Media poll
| Predicted finish | Team | Votes (1st place) |
| 1 | Alabama State | 103 (8) |
| 2 | Bethune–Cookman | 84 (3) |
| 3 | Florida A&M | 79 (3) |
| 4 | Jackson State | 76 (2) |
| 5 | Alabama A&M | 51 (1) |
| 6 | Mississippi Valley State | 27 (1) |

== Roster ==
2023 Mississippi Valley State Delta Devils baseball team
Players
Coaches

| # | Pos. | Name | B/T | Height | Weight | Year | Previous school | Home town |
|---|---|---|---|---|---|---|---|---|
| 2 | | Kameron Byrd | / | 6 ft 0 in (1.83 m) | 185 lb (84 kg) | Fr | Grayson H.S. | Loganville, Georgia |
| 3 | OF | Davon Mims | / | 5 ft 11 in (1.8 m) | 155 lb (70 kg) | Jr | Mississippi Delta C.C. | Vicksburg, Mississippi |
| 5 | | Kyndell Dolphin | / | 6 ft 0 in (1.83 m) | 170 lb (77 kg) | Jr | Charles Drew H.S. | College Park, Georgia |
| 6 | INF | Treadwell Kennedy | / | 5 ft 7 in (1.7 m) | 155 lb (70 kg) | Jr | St. Joseph Catholic | Yazoo City, Mississippi |
| 8 | OF | Davione Hull | / | 6 ft 1 in (1.85 m) | 200 lb (91 kg) | Jr | Mississippi Delta C.C. | Grenada, Mississippi |
| 9 | P | Hunter Stallings | / | 6 ft 4 in (1.93 m) | 175 lb (79 kg) | Jr | North Mecklenburg H.S. | Huntersville, North Carolina |
| 10 | OF | Narvin Booker | / | 5 ft 7 in (1.7 m) | 160 lb (73 kg) | So | Redan H.S. | Atlanta, Georgia |
| 11 | OF | Eric Johnson II | / | 5 ft 10 in (1.78 m) | 180 lb (82 kg) | Sr | Peach County H.S. | Byron, Georgia |
| 12 | OF | Michael Buckley | / | 5 ft 11 in (1.8 m) | 170 lb (77 kg) | Jr | Dallas College Cedar Valley Campus | Mesquite, Texas |
| 13 | P | Nathanael Ryhlick | / | 6 ft 1 in (1.85 m) | 210 lb (95 kg) | So | Clark State College | Dayton, Ohio |
| 14 | | Dreylin Holmes | / | 6 ft 2 in (1.88 m) | 215 lb (98 kg) | Jr | Spalding H.S. | Griffin, Georgia |
| 15 | OF | Brian Hardaway | / | 5 ft 10 in (1.78 m) | 170 lb (77 kg) | Fr | Westlake H.S. | Atlanta, Georgia |
| 16 | | Juan Rosa-Gonzalez | / | 6 ft 4 in (1.93 m) | 225 lb (102 kg) | Jr | Dallas College Cedar Valley Campus | San Juan, Puerto Rico |
| 17 | P | Calvin McClendon | / | 5 ft 10 in (1.78 m) | 150 lb (68 kg) | Jr | Leake Central H.S. | Lena, Mississippi |
| 18 | INF | Maury Weaver | / | 6 ft 2 in (1.88 m) | 175 lb (79 kg) | Jr | Trinity Christian School | Fayetteville, Georgia |
| 19 | P | Dylan Whitfield | / | 5 ft 11 in (1.8 m) | 175 lb (79 kg) | Jr | Coahoma C.C. | Vicksburg, Mississippi |
| 20 | P | Zachery Sigmon | / | 6 ft 3 in (1.91 m) | 230 lb (104 kg) | Fr | Vero Beach H.S. | Fort Pierce, Florida |
| 21 | C | Ty Washington | / | 5 ft 10 in (1.78 m) | 190 lb (86 kg) | Sr | Byron P. Steele H.S. | San Antonio, Texas |
| 22 | | Isaiah Valenzuela | / | 5 ft 10 in (1.78 m) | 195 lb (88 kg) | Jr | Milby H.S. | Houston, Texas |
| 23 | P | James Snipes | / | 6 ft 1 in (1.85 m) | 170 lb (77 kg) | Fr | Etowah H.S. | Woodstock, Georgia |
| 24 | INF | Albert Moore Jr. | / | 5 ft 11 in (1.8 m) | 190 lb (86 kg) | Fr | Woodstock H.S. | Acworth, Georgia |
| 25 | INF | Victor Figueroa | / | 6 ft 5 in (1.96 m) | 240 lb (109 kg) | Fr | River Ridge H.S. | New Port Richey, Florida |
| 26 | C | Ryan Brown | / | 6 ft 2 in (1.88 m) | 200 lb (91 kg) | Fr | Vero Beach H.S. | Fort Pierce, Florida |
| 27 | INF | Darren Willis Jr. | / | 5 ft 11 in (1.8 m) | 180 lb (82 kg) | Fr | Tattnall Square Academy | Lizella, Georgia |
| 28 | | Jodany Ofarril-Ortiz | / | 6 ft 0 in (1.83 m) | 160 lb (73 kg) | Fr | Sunshine State Elite Academy | Orlando, Florida |
| 29 | INF | Josh Wilson | / | 5 ft 8 in (1.73 m) | 140 lb (64 kg) | Jr | Canyon Springs H.S. | Moreno Valley, California |
| 30 | P | Seth Alexander | / | 6 ft 2 in (1.88 m) | 175 lb (79 kg) | Jr | El Capitan H.S. | Atwater, California |
| 31 | | Jose Salazar-Ortega | / | 6 ft 0 in (1.83 m) | 160 lb (73 kg) | So | Sunshine State Elite Academy | Kissimmee, Florida |
| 32 | INF | Chris Soeder | / | 6 ft 1 in (1.85 m) | 220 lb (100 kg) | So | Sarasota H.S. | Sarasota, Florida |
| 34 | P | Azalius Lewis | / | 5 ft 10 in (1.78 m) | 185 lb (84 kg) | So | Coahoma Community College | Philadelphia, Mississippi |
| 35 | | Angel Maldonado | / | 6 ft 1 in (1.85 m) | 180 lb (82 kg) | Jr | Mill Creek H.S. | Carolina, Puerto Rico |
| 36 | INF | Keith Harden | / | 6 ft 2 in (1.88 m) | 225 lb (102 kg) | Sr | St. Cloud Technical and Community College | Ruskin, Florida |
| 40 | P | Doug Allen | / | 6 ft 0 in (1.83 m) | 190 lb (86 kg) | Jr | Warren H.S. | Compton, California |
| 42 | OF | Christopher King | / | 6 ft 0 in (1.83 m) | 190 lb (86 kg) | Fr | Combine Academy | Rock Hill, South Carolina |
| 47 | P | Jared Adams | / | 6 ft 6 in (1.98 m) | 240 lb (109 kg) | Jr | Potomac State College of West Virginia University | Jefferson, Georgia |

Head coach

Milton Barney Jr.

Assistant coach(es)

Jaylan Bledsoe
Kenny Hudson

Legend

- (C) Team captain
- (S) Suspended
- (I) Ineligible
- Injured
- Current redshirt

Roster
Last update: February 17, 2023

== Schedule ==
2023 Mississippi Valley State Delta Devils baseball game log
Regular season
February (3–6)

| # | Date | Rank | Opponent | Site/stadium | Score | Win | Loss | Save | Attendance | Overall record | SWAC record |
|---|---|---|---|---|---|---|---|---|---|---|---|
| 1 | February 17 | | vs Texas Southern | Minute Maid Park • Houston, Texas | 7–5 | Stallings (1–0) | Zwitzer (0–1) | Salazar-Ortega (1) | – | 1–0 | – |
| 2 | February 18 | | vs Jackson State | Minute Maid Park • Houston, Texas | 1–14 | Womble (1–0) | Lewis (0–1) | None | – | 1–1 | – |
| 3 | February 19 | | vs Grambling State | Minute Maid Park • Houston, Texas | 4–14 | Rudy (1–0) | McClendon (0–1) | None | 300 | 1–2 | – |
| 4 | February 22 | | at Memphis | FedExPark • Memphis, Tennessee | 10–19 | Ross (1–0) | Lewis (0–2) | None | 319 | 1–3 | – |
| 5 | February 25 | | Arkansas–Pine Bluff | Magnolia Field • Itta Bena, Mississippi | 12–5 | McClendon (1–1) | Little (0–2) | None | – | 2–3 | – |
| 6 | February 25 | | Arkansas–Pine Bluff | Magnolia Field • Itta Bena, Mississippi | 8–11 | Greene (1–1) | Valenzuela (0–1) | None | – | 2–4 | – |
| 7 | February 26 | | Arkansas–Pine Bluff | Magnolia Field • Itta Bena, Mississippi | 16–3 | Stallings (2–0) | Little (0–2) | None | – | 3–4 | – |
| 8 | February 28 | | at Arkansas State | Tomlinson Stadium–Kell Field • Jonesboro, Arkansas | 0–12 | Carmack (1–0) | Snipes (0–1) | None | 254 | 3–5 | – |
| 9 | March 1 | | at Arkansas State | Tomlinson Stadium–Kell Field • Jonesboro, Arkansas | 2–3 | Armstrong (1–0) | Lewis' (0–3) | Wiseman (1) | 254 | 3–6 | – |

March (5–12)

| # | Date | Rank | Opponent | Site/stadium | Score | Win | Loss | Save | Attendance | Overall record | SWAC record |
|---|---|---|---|---|---|---|---|---|---|---|---|
| 10 | March 4 | | Tougaloo | Magnolia Field • Itta Bena, Mississippi | 15–5 | Sigmon (1–0) | Thomas (0–3) | None | – | 4–6 | – |
| 11 | March 4 | | Tougaloo | Magnolia Field • Itta Bena, Mississippi | 7–0 | Valenzuela (1–1) | Carter (1–1) | None | – | 5–6 | – |
| 12 | March 7 | | at Alcorn State | Foster Baseball Field at McGowan Stadium • Lorman, Mississippi | 8–4 | Stallings (3–0) | Braziel (0–3) | Salazar-Ortega (2) | – | 6–6 | – |
| – | March 8 | | Butler | Magnolia Field • Itta Bena, Mississippi | Game cancelled | | | | | | |
| 13 | March 10 | | at New Orleans | Maestri Field at Privateer Park • New Orleans, Louisiana | 3–7 | LeBlanc (2–1) | Sigmon (1–1) | Usey (2) | 322 | 6–7 | – |
| 14 | March 11 | | at New Orleans | Maestri Field at Privateer Park • New Orleans, Louisiana | 3–35 | Mitchell (3–1) | Valenzuela (1–2) | Macip (1) | 388 | 6–8 | – |
| 15 | March 12 | | at New Orleans | Maestri Field at Privateer Park • New Orleans, Louisiana | 3–16 | Horton (2–1) | Lewis (0–4) | None | 396 | 6–9 | – |
| 16 | March 14 | | at McNeese | Joe Miller Ballpark • Lake Charles, Louisiana | 2–7 | Morrow (2–0) | Valenzuela (1–3) | None | 958 | 6–10 | – |
| 17 | March 18 | | Florida A&M | Magnolia Field • Itta Bena, Mississippi | 0–8 | Viets (1–0) | Sigmon (1–2) | None | – | 6–11 | 0–1 |
| 18 | March 18 | | Florida A&M | Magnolia Field • Itta Bena, Mississippi | 2–18 | Granger (1–1) | McClendon (1–2) | None | – | 6–12 | 0–2 |
| 19 | March 19 | | Florida A&M | Magnolia Field • Itta Bena, Mississippi | 6–11 | Simmons (1–2) | Stallings (3–1) | None | – | 6–13 | 0–3 |
| 20 | March 21 | | Alcorn State | Magnolia Field • Itta Bena, Mississippi | 17–13 | McClendon (2–2) | Baylis (0–1) | Snipes (1) | 289 | 7–13 | 0–3 |
| 21 | March 22 | | at Nicholls | Ben Meyer Diamond at Ray E. Didier Field • Thibodaux, Louisiana | 5–10 | Quevedo (1–0) | Valenzuela (1–4) | None | 203 | 7–14 | 0–3 |
| 22 | March 24 | | at Bethune–Cookman | Jackie Robinson Ballpark • Daytona Beach, Florida | 3–13 | Santos (3–1) | Sigmon (1–3) | None | 141 | 7–15 | 0–4 |
| 23 | March 25 | | at Bethune–Cookman | Jackie Robinson Ballpark • Daytona Beach, Florida | 4–6 | Michaud (2–0) | Salazar-Ortega (0–1) | Gonzalez (3) | 145 | 7–16 | 0–5 |
| 24 | March 26 | | at Bethune–Cookman | Jackie Robinson Ballpark • Daytona Beach, Florida | 8–12 | Perez (2–1) | Lewis (0–5) | Gonzalez (4) | 156 | 7–17 | 0–6 |
| 25 | March 29 | | at Southeastern Louisiana | Pat Kenelly Diamond at Alumni Field • Hammond, Louisiana | 1–2 | O'Toole (2–0) | Snipes (0–2) | None | 1,006 | 7–18 | 0–6 |
| 26 | March 31 | | Jackson State | Magnolia Field • Itta Bena, Mississippi | 14–13 | Sigmon (2–3) | Gonzalez (1–1) | None | – | 8–18 | 1–6 |

April (5–12)

| # | Date | Rank | Opponent | Site/stadium | Score | Win | Loss | Save | Attendance | Overall record | SWAC record |
|---|---|---|---|---|---|---|---|---|---|---|---|
| 27 | April 1 | | Jackson State | Magnolia Field • Itta Bena, Mississippi | 7–18 | Caver (4–2) | Snipes (0–3) | None | – | 8–19 | 1–7 |
| 28 | April 2 | | Jackson State | Magnolia Field • Itta Bena, Mississippi | 6–8 | Haston (1–0) | Stallings (3–2) | None | – | 8–20 | 1–8 |
| 29 | April 4 | | vs Alcorn | Smith–Wills Stadium • Jackson, Mississippi | 20–17 | Brown (1–0) | Dews (0–1) | Snipes (2) | – | 9–20 | 1–8 |
| 30 | April 6 | | at Alabama State | Wheeler–Watkins Baseball Complex • Montgomery, Alabama | 2–8 | Melendez (6–0) | Salazar-Ortega (0–2) | None | 467 | 9–21 | 1–9 |
| 31 | April 7 | | at Alabama State | Wheeler–Watkins Baseball Complex • Montgomery, Alabama | 7–6 | Sigmon (3–3) | Seb. Colon (1–2) | None | 478 | 10–21 | 2–9 |
| 32 | April 7 | | at Alabama State | Wheeler–Watkins Baseball Complex • Montgomery, Alabama | 1–5 | Sha. Colon (3–0) | Stallings (3–3) | None | 457 | 10–22 | 2–10 |
| 33 | April 11 | | at Grambling State | Wilbert Ellis Field at Ralph Waldo Emerson Jones Park • Grambling, Louisiana | 11–12 | Boudreaux (1–3) | Sigmon (3–4) | None | 105 | 10–23 | 2–10 |
| 34 | April 14 | | Bethune–Cookman | Magnolia Field • Itta Bena, Mississippi | 2–13 | Santos (4–2) | Salazar-Ortega (0–3) | None | – | 10–24 | 2–11 |
| 35 | April 15 | | Bethune–Cookman | Magnolia Field • Itta Bena, Mississippi | 7–19 | Torres (1–0) | McClendon (2–3) | None | – | 10–25 | 2–12 |
| 36 | April 16 | | Bethune–Cookman | Magnolia Field • Itta Bena, Mississippi | 3–6 | Gonzalez (3–0) | Sigmon (3–5) | None | – | 10–26 | 2–13 |
| 37 | April 18 | | at Nicholls | Ben Meyer Diamond at Ray E. Didier Field • Thibodaux, Louisiana | 3–12 | Desandro (2–3) | Snipes (0–4) | None | 311 | 10–27 | 2–13 |
| 38 | April 21 | | at Florida A&M | Moore–Kittles Field • Tallahassee, Florida | 5–13 | Viets (5–0) | Lewis (0–6) | None | 190 | 10–28 | 2–14 |
| 39 | April 22 | | at Florida A&M | Moore–Kittles Field • Tallahassee, Florida | 12–16 | Granger (6–2) | Salazar-Ortega (0–4) | None | 114 | 10–29 | 2–15 |
| 40 | April 23 | | at Florida A&M | Moore–Kittles Field • Tallahassee, Florida | 4–11 | Wagner (2–0) | Sigmon (3–6) | None | 160 | 10–30 | 2–16 |
| – | April 25 | | Grambling State | Magnolia Field • Itta Bena, Mississippi | Game cancelled | | | | | | |
| 41 | April 28 | | Alabama A&M | Magnolia Field • Itta Bena, Mississippi | 6–1 | Stallings (4–3) | Campbell (2–2) | Sigmon (1) | – | 11–30 | 3–16 |
| 42 | April 29 | | Alabama A&M | Magnolia Field • Itta Bena, Mississippi | 13–7 | Salazar-Ortega (1–4) | Marono (1–3) | None | – | 12–30 | 4–16 |
| 43 | April 30 | | Alabama A&M | Magnolia Field • Itta Bena, Mississippi | 10–7 | McClendon (3–3) | Mateo (0–4) | Sigmon (2) | – | 13–30 | 5–16 |

May (2–7)

| # | Date | Rank | Opponent | Site/stadium | Score | Win | Loss | Save | Attendance | Overall record | SWAC record |
|---|---|---|---|---|---|---|---|---|---|---|---|
| 44 | May 5 | | Alabama State | Magnolia Field • Itta Bena, Mississippi | 5–18 | O. Melendez (10–0) | Valenzuela (1–5) | None | – | 13–31 | 5–17 |
| 45 | May 6 | | Alabama State | Magnolia Field • Itta Bena, Mississippi | 1–15 | Rivera (8–0) | Stallings (4–4) | None | – | 13–32 | 5–18 |
| 46 | May 7 | | Alabama State | Magnolia Field • Itta Bena, Mississippi | 1–14 | Sha. Colon (4–0) | Sigmon (3–7) | None | – | 13–33 | 5–19 |
| 47 | May 13 | | at Jackson State | Braddy Field • Jackson, Mississippi | 1–4 | Caver (6–4) | Stallings (4–5) | Gonzalez (8) | 75 | 13–34 | 5–20 |
| 48 | May 13 | | at Jackson State | Braddy Field • Jackson, Mississippi | 2–12 | Guy (4–4) | Salazar-Ortega (1–5) | None | 154 | 13–35 | 5–21 |
| 49 | May 14 | | at Jackson State | Braddy Field • Jackson, Mississippi | 7–6 | Sigmon (4–7) | Gonzalez (1–2) | None | 105 | 14–35 | 6–21 |
| 50 | May 18 | | at Alabama A&M | Bulldog Field • Huntsville, Alabama | 5–3 | Sigmon (5–7) | Campbell (2–4) | None | 25 | 15–35 | 7–21 |
| 51 | May 19 | | at Alabama A&M | Bulldog Field • Huntsville, Alabama | 3–4 | Mateo (1–5) | Lewis (0–7) | None | 70 | 15–36 | 7–22 |
| 52 | May 20 | | at Alabama A&M | Bulldog Field • Huntsville, Alabama | 3–5 | Marano (2–4) | Snipes (0–5) | None | 70 | 15–37 | 7–23 |
