= 2022 Mississippi Valley State Delta Devils baseball team =

Sports team

2022 Mississippi Valley State Delta Devils baseball
- Conference: Southwestern Athletic Conference
- West
- Record: 10–31–1 (4–25 SWAC)
- Head coach: Stanley Stubbs (1st season)
- Assistant coaches: Jaylan Bledsoe (1st season); Jalin Lawson (1st season)
- Pitching coach: Matt Ribera (1st season)
- Home stadium: Magnolia Field

2022 Southwestern Athletic Conference baseball standings
	Conf.						Overall
Team	W		L		T	PCT	W		L		T	PCT
East
Alabama State ^{x}‍†‍‡‍^{y}	21	–	8	–	0	.724	34	–	23	–	0	.596
Bethune–Cookman ‍‍‍	20	–	11	–	0	.645	28	–	32	–	0	.467
Florida A&M ‍‍‍	19	–	11	–	0	.633	29	–	30	–	0	.492
Jackson State ‍‍‍	16	–	14	–	0	.533	29	–	27	–	0	.518
Alabama A&M ‍‍‍	11	–	19	–	0	.367	15	–	34	–	0	.306
Mississippi Valley State ‍‍‍	4	–	24	–	0	.143	10	–	30	–	1	.256
West
Southern ^{x}‍‍‍	21	–	9	–	0	.700	27	–	31	–	0	.466
Grambling State ‍‍‍	20	–	10	–	0	.667	26	–	31	–	0	.456
Texas Southern ‍‍‍	19	–	11	–	0	.633	28	–	25	–	0	.528
Prairie View A&M ‍‍‍	19	–	11	–	0	.633	30	–	27	–	0	.526
Arkansas–Pine Bluff ‍‍‍	9	–	21	–	0	.300	13	–	36	–	1	.270
Alcorn State ‍‍‍	2	–	28	–	0	.067	2	–	39	–	0	.049
x – Division champion † – Conference champion ‡ – Tournament champion y – Invited to the NCAA tournament Rankings from Collegiate Baseball

The Mississippi Valley State Delta Devils baseball team was a baseball team that represented the Mississippi Valley State University in the 2022 NCAA Division I baseball season. The Delta Devils were members of the Southwestern Athletic Conference and played their home games at Magnolia Field in Itta Bena, Mississippi. They were led by first-year head coach Stanley Stubbs.

== Previous season ==
The Delta Devils finished the 2021 NCAA Division I baseball season 0–20 overall (0–17 conference) and fifth place in east division of the conference standings, as the season was limited to mostly conference games for most SWAC teams due to the COVID-19 pandemic. Following back-to-back win-less seasons, head coach Aaron Stevens was relieved of his duties. On July 27, 2021, Stanley Stubbs was named the head coach of the Delta Devils.

== Roster ==
2022 Mississippi Valley State Delta Devils baseball team
Players
Coaches

#	Pos.	Name	B/T	Height	Weight	Year	Previous school	Home town
1		Darrien Chapman	/	6 ft 0 in (1.83 m)	170 lb (77 kg)	So	Griffin H.S.	Griffin, Georgia
2		Antonio Walker	/	6 ft 0 in (1.83 m)	160 lb (73 kg)	Jr	Lincoln H.S.	Ypsilanti, Michigan
4	OF	James Walton	/	5 ft 10 in (1.78 m)	160 lb (73 kg)	Jr	Choctaw County H.S.	Lisman, Alabama
5		Kyndell Dolphin	/	6 ft 0 in (1.83 m)	170 lb (77 kg)	So	Charles Drew H.S.	College Park, Georgia
6	INF	Treadwell Kennedy	/	5 ft 7 in (1.7 m)	155 lb (70 kg)	So	St. Joseph Catholic	Yazoo City, Mississippi
7		Angel Maldonado	/	6 ft 1 in (1.85 m)	180 lb (82 kg)	So	Mill Creek H.S.	Carolina, Puerto Rico
8	OF	Willie Johnson	/	6 ft 1 in (1.85 m)	170 lb (77 kg)	Sr	Leake Central H.S.	Lena, Mississippi
9	P	Hunter Stallings	/	6 ft 2 in (1.88 m)	150 lb (68 kg)	So	North Mecklenburg H.S.	Huntersville, North Carolina
10	OF	Narvin Booker	/	5 ft 7 in (1.7 m)	160 lb (73 kg)	Fr	Redan H.S.	Atlanta, Georgia
11	OF	Eric Johnson II	/	5 ft 10 in (1.78 m)	180 lb (82 kg)	Jr	Peach County H.S.	Byron, Georgia
12	C	Johnathan Yandrich	/	6 ft 0 in (1.83 m)	190 lb (86 kg)	So	Midland H.S.	Odessa, Texas
13	OF	Davon Mims	/	5 ft 11 in (1.8 m)	155 lb (70 kg)	So	Mississippi Delta C.C.	Vicksburg, Mississippi
14		Dreylin Holmes	/	6 ft 2 in (1.88 m)	190 lb (86 kg)	So	Spalding H.S.	Griffin, Georgia
15	C	Jan Tolentino	/	5 ft 10 in (1.78 m)	180 lb (82 kg)	So	Leadership Christian Academy	Caguas, Puerto Rico
16		Iankel Santos	/	6 ft 3 in (1.91 m)	210 lb (95 kg)	Jr	Penn Foster H.S.	Carolina, Puerto Rico
17	P	Calvin McClendon	/	5 ft 10 in (1.78 m)	150 lb (68 kg)	So	Leake Central	Lena, Mississippi
18	INF	Maury Weaver	/	6 ft 2 in (1.88 m)	175 lb (79 kg)	So	Trinity Christian School	Fayetteville, Georgia
19	P	Dylan Whitfield	/	5 ft 11 in (1.8 m)	175 lb (79 kg)	So	Coahoma C.C.	Vicksburg, Mississippi
20	P	Ethan Charles	/	6 ft 1 in (1.85 m)	180 lb (82 kg)	So	Somerset Academy	Pembroke Pines, Florida
21	C	Ty Washington	/	5 ft 10 in (1.78 m)	190 lb (86 kg)	Jr	Byron P. Steele H.S.	San Antonio, Texas
22		Isaiah Valenzuela	/	5 ft 10 in (1.78 m)	195 lb (88 kg)	So	Milby H.S.	Houston, Texas
23	INF	Keith Harden	/	6 ft 3 in (1.91 m)	215 lb (98 kg)	So	Lennard H.S.	Tampa, Florida
24	P	Abraham Ortiz	/	6 ft 3 in (1.91 m)	195 lb (88 kg)	So	Puerto Rico Baseball Academy and High School	Trujillo Alto, Puerto Rico
25		Kentrez Bershell	/	5 ft 7 in (1.7 m)	160 lb (73 kg)	Fr	Vicksburg H.S.	Vicksburg, Mississippi
26	INF	Joshua Wilson	/	5 ft 8 in (1.73 m)	140 lb (64 kg)	So	Canyon Springs H.S.	Moreno Valley, California
27	C	Angel Perez	/	5 ft 4 in (1.63 m)	160 lb (73 kg)	Sr	Puerto Rico Baseball Academy and High School	Luquillo, Puerto Rico
28		Jose Salazar-Ortega	/	6 ft 0 in (1.83 m)	160 lb (73 kg)	Fr	Sunshine State Elite Academy	Kissimmee, Florida
29	INF	Christopher Soeder	/	6 ft 1 in (1.85 m)	220 lb (100 kg)	Fr	Sarasota H.S.	Sarasota, Florida
30		Printon Peterson	/	6 ft 0 in (1.83 m)	200 lb (91 kg)	So	Columbus H.S.	Columbus, Georgia
31	P	Caleb Cawthon	/	6 ft 1 in (1.85 m)	205 lb (93 kg)	Fr	Sacred Heart H.S.	Hattiesburg, Mississippi
32	P	Caleb Causey	/	6 ft 1 in (1.85 m)	200 lb (91 kg)	Fr	Hargrave Military Academy	Richmond, Virginia
33		Sieas Elliott	/	5 ft 10 in (1.78 m)	170 lb (77 kg)	So	Jonesboro H.S.	Jonesboro, Georgia
34	INF	Juan Reyes	/	5 ft 10 in (1.78 m)	170 lb (77 kg)	Fr	San Juan Bosco Fe y Alegria	La Vega, Dominican Republic
36	P	Parrish Green	/	6 ft 1 in (1.85 m)	160 lb (73 kg)	So	Morgan Park H.S.	Chicago, Illinois
37	INF	Kameron Spencer	/	5 ft 10 in (1.78 m)	160 lb (73 kg)	So	Gentry H.S.	Indianola, Mississippi
38	INF	Cedric Holt	/	6 ft 0 in (1.83 m)	210 lb (95 kg)	So	Gibbs H.S.	St. Petersburg, Florida
39	OF	Derrick Brown	/	5 ft 11 in (1.8 m)	160 lb (73 kg)	Fr	Vicksburg H.S.	Vicksburg, Mississippi
40	C	Thomas Lyles	/	5 ft 11 in (1.8 m)	180 lb (82 kg)	Fr	Fayette County H.S.	Fayetteville, Georgia

Head coach

Stanley Stubbs

Assistant coach(es)

Jaylan Bledsoe
Jalin Lawson

Pitching coach(es)

Matt Ribera

Legend

- (C) Team captain
- (S) Suspended
- (I) Ineligible
- Injured
- Current redshirt

Roster
Last update: February 7, 2022

== Schedule ==
2022 Mississippi Valley State Devils Devils baseball game log
Regular season
February (2–3)

#	Date	Opponent	Site/stadium	Score	Win	Loss	Save	Attendance	Overall record	SWAC record
1	February 20	Rust	Magnolia Field • Itta Bena, Mississippi	15–3	Valenzuela (1–0)	Sampson (1–1)	None	43	1–0	–
2	February 20	Rust	Magnolia Field • Itta Bena, Mississippi	16–8	Ortiz (1–0)	Jackson (0–1)	None	48	2–0	–
3	February 25	at Nicholls	Ben Meyer Diamond at Ray E. Didier Field • Thibodaux, Louisiana	1–11	Saltaformaggio (1–0)	McClendon (0–1)	None	133	2–1	–
4	February 26	at Nicholls	Ben Meyer Diamond at Ray E. Didier Field • Thibodaux, Louisiana	0–10	Theriot (1–1)	Valenzuela (1–1)	None	301	2–2	–
5	February 27	at Nicholls	Ben Meyer Diamond at Ray E. Didier Field • Thibodaux, Louisiana	10–16	Desandro (1–0)	Stallings (0–1)	None	222	2–3	–

March (6–6–1)

#	Date	Opponent	Site/stadium	Score	Win	Loss	Save	Attendance	Overall record	SWAC record
6	March 1	at Arkansas State	Tomlinson Stadium–Kell Field • Jonesboro, Arkansas	2–17	Williams (1–1)	McClendon (0–2)	None	292	2–4	–
7	March 2	at Arkansas State	Tomlinson Stadium–Kell Field • Jonesboro, Arkansas	3–13	Paschal (1–0)	Valenzuela (1–2)	None	151	2–5	–
8	March 4	at Arkansas–Pine Bluff	Torii Hunter Baseball Complex • Pine Bluff, Arkansas	2–1	McClendon (1–2)	Duran (0–2)	Stallings (1)	273	3–5	–
9	March 5	at Arkansas–Pine Bluff	Torii Hunter Baseball Complex • Pine Bluff, Arkansas	16–9	Valenzuela (2–2)	Elarton (0–1)	None	216	4–5	–
10	March 5	at Arkansas–Pine Bluff	Torii Hunter Baseball Complex • Pine Bluff, Arkansas	8–8	–	–	None	265	4–5–1	–
–	March 15	LeMoyne–Owen	Magnolia Field • Itta Bena, Mississippi	Game cancelled						
–	March 15	LeMoyne–Owen	Magnolia Field • Itta Bena, Mississippi	Game cancelled						
11	March 19	Alabama A&M	Magnolia Field • Itta Bena, Mississippi	5–6	Crenshaw (2–0)	Walker (0–1)	None	107	4–6–1	0–1
12	March 20	Alabama A&M	Magnolia Field • Itta Bena, Mississippi	8–7	Santos (1–0)	Torres (0–3)	None	95	5–6–1	1–1
13	March 20	Alabama A&M	Magnolia Field • Itta Bena, Mississippi	8–7	Walker (1–1)	Hernandez (0–1)	None	122	6–6–1	2–1
14	March 25	at Florida A&M	Moore–Kittles Field • Tallahassee, Florida	3–12	Viets (2–3)	Walker (1–2)	Langley (1)	300	6–7–1	2–2
15	March 26	at Florida A&M	Moore–Kittles Field • Tallahassee, Florida	3–20	Wilkinson (2–3)	Valenzuela (2–3)	None	350	6–8–1	2–3
16	March 27	at Florida A&M	Moore–Kittles Field • Tallahassee, Florida	0–5	Fox (1–2)	Stallings (0–2)	None	350	6–9–1	2–4
17	March 29	Tougaloo	Magnolia Field • Itta Bena, Mississippi	20–6	McClendon (2–2)	Borders –	None	66	7–9–1	2–4
18	March 29	Tougaloo	Magnolia Field • Itta Bena, Mississippi	16–1	Valenzuela (3–3)	Hickman –	None	87	8–9–1	2–4

April (2–11)

#	Date	Opponent	Site/stadium	Score	Win	Loss	Save	Attendance	Overall record	SWAC record
19	April 1	Bethune–Cookman	Magnolia Field • Itta Bena, Mississippi	1–3	Fisher (3–0)	Salazar-Ortega (0–1)	None	92	8–10–1	2–5
20	April 2	Bethune–Cookman	Magnolia Field • Itta Bena, Mississippi	3–2	Stallings (1–2)	Santos (2–2)	None	56	9–10–1	3–5
21	April 3	Bethune–Cookman	Magnolia Field • Itta Bena, Mississippi	13–17	Gonzalez (1–3)	Valenzuela (3–4)	None	74	9–11–1	3–6
22	April 8	at Jackson State	Braddy Field • Jackson, Mississippi	2–11	Galatas (2–1)	McClendon (2–3)	None	50	9–12–1	3–7
23	April 9	at Jackson State	Braddy Field • Jackson, Mississippi	5–6	Valdez (2–2)	Ortiz (1–1)	None	75	9–13–1	3–8
24	April 10	at Jackson State	Braddy Field • Jackson, Mississippi	7–21	Marulanda (4–4)	Walker (1–3)	None	75	9–14–1	3–9
25	April 14	Alabama State	Magnolia Field • Itta Bena, Mississippi	11–16	Harris (3–2)	Reyes (0–1)	None	49	9–15–1	3–10
–	April 15	Alabama State	Magnolia Field • Itta Bena, Mississippi	Game cancelled						
–	April 16	Alabama State	Magnolia Field • Itta Bena, Mississippi	Game cancelled						
26	April 22	at Bethune–Cookman	Jackie Robinson Ballpark • Daytona Beach, Florida	12–2	Stallings (2–2)	Lipthratt (4–3)	None	66	10–15–1	4–10
27	April 23	at Bethune–Cookman	Jackie Robinson Ballpark • Daytona Beach, Florida	3–11	Santos (4–3)	McClendon (2–4)	None	77	10–16–1	4–11
28	April 24	at Bethune–Cookman	Jackie Robinson Ballpark • Daytona Beach, Florida	1–11	Vazquez (4–3)	Ortiz (1–2)	None	91	10–17–1	4–12
29	April 26	at Memphis	FedExPark • Memphis, Tennessee	4–13	Kessinger (2–0)	Valenzuela (3–5)	None	312	10–18–1	4–12
30	April 29	Florida A&M	Magnolia Field • Itta Bena, Mississippi	5–16	Viets (7–3)	Stallings (2–3)	None	61	10–19–1	4–13
31	April 30	Florida A&M	Magnolia Field • Itta Bena, Mississippi	6–17	Wilkinson (4–4)	Ortiz (1–3)	None	112	10–20–1	4–14

May (0–10)

#	Date	Opponent	Site/stadium	Score	Win	Loss	Save	Attendance	Overall record	SWAC record
32	May 1	Florida A&M	Magnolia Field • Itta Bena, Mississippi	6–11	McCollum (2–1)	Valenzuela (3–6)	None	83	10–21–1	4–15
33	May 7	at Alabama A&M	James Clemens High School • Madison, Alabama	4–5	Seaton (2–2)	Salazar-Ortega (0–2)	None	87	10–22–1	4–16
34	May 7	at Alabama A&M	James Clemens High School • Madison, Alabama	0–5	Torres (2–4)	Ortiz (1–4)	None	93	10–23–1	4–17
35	May 8	at Alabama A&M	James Clemens High School • Madison, Alabama	5–10	Whitted (2–3)	McClendon (2–3)	None	133	10–24–1	4–18
36	May 13	at Alabama State	Wheeler–Watkins Baseball Complex • Montgomery, Alabama	5–16	Pooler (8–2)	Stallings (2–4)	None	168	10–25–1	4–19
37	May 14	at Alabama State	Wheeler–Watkins Baseball Complex • Montgomery, Alabama	1–8	McIntosh (3–3)	Ortiz (1–5)	None	250	10–26–1	4–20
38	May 15	at Alabama State	Wheeler–Watkins Baseball Complex • Montgomery, Alabama	7–9	Melendez (1–0)	Walker (1–4)	None	280	10–27–1	4–21
39	May 19	Jackson State	Magnolia Field • Itta Bena, Mississippi	4–19	Galatas (5–2)	Ortiz (1–6)	None	45	10–29–1	4–23
40	May 20	Jackson State	Magnolia Field • Itta Bena, Mississippi	5–27	Gonzalez (6–4)	McClendon (2–7)	None	62	10–30–1	4–24
41	May 21	vs Jackson State	MGM Park • Biloxi, Mississippi	8–17	Marulanda (7–7)	Oritz (1–7)	None	201	10–31–1	4–25

== Awards ==
=== SWAC Players of the Week ===
Weekly Awards
Player	Award	Date Awarded	Ref.
Dreylin Holmes	Hitter of the Week	April 6, 2022	

=== Conference awards ===
Awards
Player	Award	Date Awarded	Ref.
Dreylin Holmes	Second team All-SWAC	May 24, 2022	
