= 2025 Mississippi Valley State Delta Devils baseball team =

American college baseball season

2025 Mississippi Valley State Delta Devils baseball
- Conference: Southwestern Athletic Conference
- Record: 9–13 (4–8 SWAC)
- Head coach: C. J. Bilbrey (1st season)
- Home stadium: Magnolia Field

2025 Southwestern Athletic Conference baseball standings
	Conf.				Overall
Team	W		L	PCT	W		L	PCT
Bethune–Cookman ‍†‍‡‍^{y}	24	–	5	.828	37	–	23	.617
Florida A&M ‍‍‍	24	–	6	.800	33	–	25	.569
Alabama State ‍‍‍	21	–	9	.700	31	–	29	.517
Arkansas–Pine Bluff ‍‍‍	17	–	9	.654	19	–	34	.358
Grambling State ‍‍‍	18	–	11	.621	26	–	28	.481
Jackson State ‍‍‍	16	–	12	.571	29	–	21	.580
Southern ‍‍‍	15	–	13	.536	24	–	27	.471
Texas Southern ‍‍‍	15	–	15	.500	22	–	32	.407
Prairie View A&M ‍‍‍	13	–	14	.481	17	–	36	.321
Mississippi Valley State ‍‍‍	7	–	23	.233	12	–	29	.293
Alabama A&M ‍‍‍	2	–	27	.069	10	–	40	.200
Alcorn State ‍‍‍	1	–	29	.033	6	–	43	.122
† – Conference champion ‡ – Tournament champion y – Invited to the NCAA Tournament; As of May 31, 2025; Rankings from D1Baseball

The 2025 Mississippi Valley State Delta Devils baseball team is a baseball team that represents the Mississippi Valley State University in the 2025 NCAA Division I baseball season. The Delta Devils are members of the Southwestern Athletic Conference and play their home games at Magnolia Field in Itta Bena, Mississippi. They were led by second-year head coach C. J. Bilbrey.

== Previous season ==
The Delta Devils finished the 2024 NCAA Division I baseball season 12–34 overall (4–26 conference) and sixth place in the west division of the conference standings, failing to qualify for the 2024 Southwestern Athletic Conference Baseball Tournament.

== Preseason SWAC poll ==
For the 2025 poll, Mississippi Valley State was projected to finish in twelfth in the Conference.

Coaches poll
Predicted finish	Team	Votes (1st place)
1	Grambling State	156 (7)
2	Bethune-Cookman	150 (3)
3	Jackson State	146
4	Alabama State	142 (1)
5	Florida A&M	140 (2)
6	Southern	119 (1)
7	Texas Southern	103
8	Prairie View A&M	97
9	Arkansas–Pine Bluff	58 (1)
10	Alabama A&M	47
11	Alcorn State	42 (1)
12	Mississippi Valley State	40

== Roster ==
2025 Mississippi Valley State Delta Devils baseball team
Players
Coaches

#	Pos.	Name	B/T	Height	Weight	Year	Previous school	Home town
0	INF	Kade Wood	R/R	6 ft 0 in (1.83 m)	175 lb (79 kg)	Sr	Ranger College	Atlanta, Texas
1	INF	Tanner Akoi	S/R	5 ft 9 in (1.75 m)	175 lb (79 kg)	Jr	Mt. San Jacinto College	Mililani, Hawaii
3	C	Tom Early	L/R	6 ft 0 in (1.83 m)	185 lb (84 kg)	Jr	San Diego City College	Jensen Beach, Florida
4	OF	Simon Yoakum IV	L/L	6 ft 2 in (1.88 m)	200 lb (91 kg)	RS Fr	Pittsburg State	Rolla, Missouri
5	UTL	Gunner Lakins	R/R	6 ft 4 in (1.93 m)	230 lb (104 kg)	Jr	Lincoln Trail College	Franklin, Ohio
6	RHP	James Rivera	R/R	6 ft 1 in (1.85 m)	220 lb (100 kg)	Jr	Chaffey College	Rancho Cucamonga, California
7	RHP	Malik Kemp	R/R	6 ft 3 in (1.91 m)	230 lb (104 kg)	Fr	LaGrange H.S.	Douglasville, Georgia
8	OF	Noah Bufford	R/R	6 ft 2 in (1.88 m)	200 lb (91 kg)	So	Pinson Valley H.S.	Birmingham, Alabama
9	RHP	Hunter Stallings	R/R	6 ft 4 in (1.93 m)	175 lb (79 kg)	Sr	North Mecklenburg H.S.	Huntersville, North Carolina
10	OF	Ricky Hernandez	R/R	5 ft 7 in (1.7 m)	175 lb (79 kg)	So	Bishop Dunne Catholic H.S.	Cedar Hill, Texas
11	UTL	Aiden Meyer	R/R	6 ft 3 in (1.91 m)	195 lb (88 kg)	Fr	Ste. Genevieve H.S.	Ste. Genevieve, Missouri
12	INF	Benny Hernandez	R/R	6 ft 0 in (1.83 m)	225 lb (102 kg)	Sr	El Paso Community College	Cedar Hill, Texas
14	RHP	Kai Hanasaki	R/R	5 ft 11 in (1.8 m)	170 lb (77 kg)	So	College of the Desert	Tokyo, Japan
15	INF	Eric Williams	R/R	5 ft 10 in (1.78 m)	185 lb (84 kg)	Fr	Fort Zumwalt East H.S.	St. Peters, Missouri
18	RHP	Shuto Tiger Okumura	S/R	5 ft 10 in (1.78 m)	185 lb (84 kg)	Jr	University of Arkansas Rich Mountain	Takatsuki, Japan
20	C	Jaxon Haynes	R/R	6 ft 3 in (1.91 m)	220 lb (100 kg)	Jr	Ranger College	Frisco, Texas
21	UTL	Jace Jones	R/R	6 ft 5 in (1.96 m)	225 lb (102 kg)	Jr	South Florida State College	Fort Myers, Florida
22	UTL	Mac Floyd	R/R	6 ft 5 in (1.96 m)	225 lb (102 kg)	Jr	Lutheran H.S. South	St. Louis, Missouri
23	RHP	James Snipes	R/R	6 ft 2 in (1.88 m)	195 lb (88 kg)	Jr	Etowah H.S.	Woodstock, Georgia
24	RHP	Kobe Ladd	R/R	6 ft 1 in (1.85 m)	225 lb (102 kg)	So	Corona del Sol H.S.	Tempe, Arizona
25	UTL	Brayden Eftink	L/R	6 ft 0 in (1.83 m)	210 lb (95 kg)	Sr	Three Rivers College	St. Louis, Missouri
27	C	Tre Relliford	R/R	5 ft 11 in (1.8 m)	215 lb (98 kg)	Fr	Douglas County H.S.	Villa Rica, Georgia
28	INF	Jodany Ofarril-Ortiz	R/R	5 ft 8 in (1.73 m)	170 lb (77 kg)	Jr	Sunshine State Elite Academy	Orlando, Florida
32	INF	Chris Soeder	R/R	6 ft 3 in (1.91 m)	215 lb (98 kg)	Jr	Sarasota H.S.	Sarasota, Florida
33	LHP	Nate Davila	L/L	6 ft 1 in (1.85 m)	220 lb (100 kg)	Fr	John Marshall H.S.	San Antonio, Texas
35	RHP	Logan Darnell	R/R	6 ft 1 in (1.85 m)	215 lb (98 kg)	Fr	Rockwood Summit H.S.	Fenton, Missouri
42	RHP	Craig McGee	R/R	6 ft 2 in (1.88 m)	210 lb (95 kg)	Sr	University of Missouri–St. Louis	St. Louis, Missouri
43	OF	Kendall Brookins	L/L	6 ft 0 in (1.83 m)	185 lb (84 kg)	Jr	Arkansas State University–Mountain Home	Fairview Heights, Illinois
44	LHP	Brady Heinzmann	L/L	6 ft 2 in (1.88 m)	220 lb (100 kg)	Jr	Kaskaskia College	Carlyle, Illinois

Head coach

C. J. Bilbrey

Assistant coach(es)

Legend

- (C) Team captain
- (S) Suspended
- (I) Ineligible
- Injured
- Current redshirt

Roster
Last update: February 13, 2025

== Schedule ==
2025 Mississippi Valley State Delta Devils baseball game log
Regular season
February (1–4)

#	Date	Rank	Opponent	Site/Stadium	Score	Win	Loss	Save	Attendance	Overall Record	SWAC Record
–	February 14		Western Illinois	Magnolia Field • Itta Bena, Mississippi	Game cancelled						
–	February 15		Alcorn State	Magnolia Field • Itta Bena, Mississippi	Game cancelled						
–	February 15		Western Illinois	Magnolia Field • Itta Bena, Mississippi	Game cancelled						
1	February 17		Alcorn State	Magnolia Field • Itta Bena, Mississippi	12–10	Wood (1–0)	Hunt (0–1)	None	75	1–0	–
–	February 19		Manhattan	Magnolia Field • Itta Bena, Mississippi	Game cancelled						
2	February 21		Lindenwood	Magnolia Field • Itta Bena, Mississippi	3–19	Newell (1–1)	Ladd (0–1)	None	87	1–1	–
3	February 22		Lindenwood	Magnolia Field • Itta Bena, Mississippi	0–7	Brown (1–1)	Darnell (0–1)	None	76	1–2	–
4	February 22		Lindenwood	Magnolia Field • Itta Bena, Mississippi	2–13	Buschschulte (1–1)	Snipes (0–1)	None	67	1–3	–
5	February 23		Lindenwood	Magnolia Field • Itta Bena, Mississippi	0–13	Smith (1–0)	Eftink (0–1)	None	52	1–4	–
–	February 28		vs Eastern Kentucky	Cole Field • Carrollton, Georgia	Game cancelled						

March (7–6)

#	Date	Rank	Opponent	Site/Stadium	Score	Win	Loss	Save	Attendance	Overall Record	SWAC Record
–	March 1		vs Eastern Kentucky	Cole Field • Carrollton, Georgia	Game cancelled						
–	March 1		at West Georgia	Cole Field • Carrollton, Georgia	Game cancelled						
–	March 2		at West Georgia	Cole Field • Carrollton, Georgia	Game cancelled						
–	March 4		at Alcorn State	Foster Baseball Field at McGowan Stadium • Lorman, Mississippi	Game cancelled						
–	March 5		Lane	Magnolia Field • Itta Bena, Mississippi	Game cancelled						
–	March 5		Lane	Magnolia Field • Itta Bena, Mississippi	Game cancelled						
6	March 7		Arkansas Baptist	Magnolia Field • Itta Bena, Mississippi	21–2	Darnell (1–1)	Rondon (0–2)	None	64	2–4	–
7	March 8		Arkansas Baptist	Magnolia Field • Itta Bena, Mississippi	17–3	Snipes (1–1)	Camacho (0–2)	None	54	3–4	–
8	March 8		Arkansas Baptist	Magnolia Field • Itta Bena, Mississippi	18–6	Eftink (1–1)	Howard (0–1)	None	42	4–4	–
–	March 12		at Northwestern State	H. Alvin Brown–C. C. Stroud Field • Natchitoches, Louisiana	Game cancelled						
9	March 14		Texas Southern	Magnolia Field • Itta Bena, Mississippi	0–13	McClendon (2–1)	Darnell (1–2)	None	55	4–5	0–1
10	March 15		Texas Southern	Magnolia Field • Itta Bena, Mississippi	3–12	Braziel (2–4)	Snipes (1–2)	None	43	4–6	0–2
11	March 16		Texas Southern	Magnolia Field • Itta Bena, Mississippi	7–20	Malone (2–1)	Eftink (1–2)	None	45	4–7	0–3
–	March 18		at McNeese	Joe Miller Ballpark • Lake Charles, Louisiana	Game cancelled						
–	March 19		at McNeese	Joe Miller Ballpark • Lake Charles, Louisiana	Game cancelled						
12	March 21		at Alabama A&M	Bulldog Field • Huntsville, Alabama	5–8	Rodriguez (1–0)	Darnell (1–3)	Morris (1)	179	4–8	0–4
13	March 22		at Alabama A&M	Bulldog Field • Huntsville, Alabama	11–12	Morris (1–0)	Wood (1–1)	None	–	4–9	0–5
14	March 23		at Alabama A&M	Bulldog Field • Huntsville, Alabama	9–4	Tiger Okumura (1–0)	Nolley (0–1)	None	161	5–9	1–5
15	March 26		at Southeastern Louisiana	Pat Kenelly Diamond at Alumni Field • Hammond, Louisiana	0–13	Toups 1–0	Meyer (0–1)	None	1,013	5–10	1–5
16	March 28		Alcorn State	Magnolia Field • Itta Bena, Mississippi	13–11	Darnell (2–3)	Bell (0–4)	None	82	6–10	2–5
17	March 29		Alcorn State	Magnolia Field • Itta Bena, Mississippi	16–13	Wood (2–1)	Chirinos (0–1)	None	52	7–10	3–5
18	March 30		Alcorn State	Magnolia Field • Itta Bena, Mississippi	15–12	Darnell (3–3)	Ford (0–7)	None	62	8–10	4–5

April (1–3)

#	Date	Rank	Opponent	Site/Stadium	Score	Win	Loss	Save	Attendance	Overall Record	SWAC Record
19	April 2		Rust	Magnolia Field • Itta Bena, Mississippi	15–9	Hanasaki (1–0)	Baker (0–1)	None	78	9–10	4–5
20	April 4		at Bethune–Cookman	Historic Sanford Memorial Stadium • Sanford, Florida	3–13	Boccabello (5–1)	Eftink (1–3)	None	71	9–11	4–6
21	April 5		at Bethune–Cookman	Historic Sanford Memorial Stadium • Sanford, Florida	5–6	Zambrano (3–1)	Darnell (3–4)	None	79	9–12	4–7
22	April 5		at Bethune–Cookman	Historic Sanford Memorial Stadium • Sanford, Florida	5–15	Sanchez (4–1)	Wood (2–2)	None	132	9–13	4–8
23	April 11		Florida A&M	Magnolia Field • Itta Bena, Mississippi	–	–	–	–	–	–	–
24	April 12		Florida A&M	Magnolia Field • Itta Bena, Mississippi	–	–	–	–	–	–	–
25	April 13		Florida A&M	Magnolia Field • Itta Bena, Mississippi	–	–	–	–	–	–	–
26	April 17		Alabama State	Magnolia Field • Itta Bena, Mississippi	–	–	–	–	–	–	–
27	April 18		Alabama State	Magnolia Field • Itta Bena, Mississippi	–	–	–	–	–	–	–
28	April 19		Alabama State	Magnolia Field • Itta Bena, Mississippi	–	–	–	–	–	–	–
29	April 25		at Southern	Lee–Hines Field • Baton Rouge, Louisiana	–	–	–	–	–	–	–
30	April 26		at Southern	Lee–Hines Field • Baton Rouge, Louisiana	–	–	–	–	–	–	–
31	April 27		at Southern	Lee–Hines Field • Baton Rouge, Louisiana	–	–	–	–	–	–	–

May (0–0)

#	Date	Rank	Opponent	Site/Stadium	Score	Win	Loss	Save	Attendance	Overall Record	SWAC Record
32	May 2		at Jackson State	Braddy Field • Jackson, Mississippi	–	–	–	–	–	–	–
33	May 3		at Jackson State	Braddy Field • Jackson, Mississippi	–	–	–	–	–	–	–
34	May 4		at Jackson State	Braddy Field • Jackson, Mississippi	–	–	–	–	–	–	–
35	May 6		at Memphis	FedExPark • Memphis, Tennessee	–	–	–	–	–	–	–
36	May 9		Prairie View A&M	Magnolia Field • Itta Bena, Mississippi	–	–	–	–	–	–	–
37	May 10		Prairie View A&M	Magnolia Field • Itta Bena, Mississippi	–	–	–	–	–	–	–
38	May 11		Prairie View A&M	Magnolia Field • Itta Bena, Mississippi	–	–	–	–	–	–	–
39	May 18		Grambling State	Magnolia Field • Itta Bena, Mississippi	–	–	–	–	–	–	–
40	May 19		Grambling State	Magnolia Field • Itta Bena, Mississippi	–	–	–	–	–	–	–
41	May 20		Grambling State	Magnolia Field • Itta Bena, Mississippi	–	–	–	–	–	–	–
