= 2015 Alabama State Hornets baseball team =

2015 Alabama State Hornets baseball
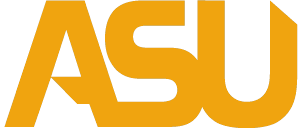
- Conference: Southwestern Athletic Conference
- Record: 13–8 (7–2 SWAC)
- Head coach: Mervyl Melendez (4th season)
- Assistant coaches: José Vázquez (4th season); Drew Clark (4th season)
- Home stadium: Wheeler–Watkins Baseball Complex

2015 Southwestern Athletic Conference baseball standings
	Conf.						Overall
Team	W		L		T	PCT	W		L		T	PCT
East
Alabama State ^{x}‍‍‍	18	–	6	–	0	.750	30	–	17	–	0	.638
Alabama A&M ‍‍‍	16	–	8	–	0	.667	25	–	26	–	0	.490
Jackson State ‍‍‍	15	–	9	–	0	.625	30	–	22	–	0	.577
Alcorn State ‍‍‍	8	–	17	–	0	.320	15	–	38	–	0	.283
Mississippi Valley State* ‍‍‍	4	–	20	–	0	.167	7	–	36	–	1	.170
West
Arkansas–Pine Bluff ^{x}‍‍‍	16	–	6	–	0	.727	24	–	16	–	0	.600
Texas Southern ‍‍‍	16	–	7	–	0	.696	26	–	16	–	0	.619
Southern* ‍‍‍	13	–	8	–	0	.619	17	–	22	–	0	.436
Grambling State ‍‍‍	7	–	18	–	0	.280	9	–	34	–	0	.209
Prairie View A&M ‍‍‍	5	–	19	–	0	.208	15	–	34	–	0	.306
‡ – Tournament champion As of May 7, 2015; Rankings from Collegiate Baseball; *Ineligible for postseason play due to APR penalties

The 2015 Alabama State Hornets baseball team represented Alabama State University during the 2015 NCAA Division I baseball season. The Hornets played their home games at the Wheeler–Watkins Baseball Complex as a member of the Southwestern Athletic Conference. They were led by head coach Mervyl Melendez, in his fourth season at Alabama State.

== Previous season ==
In 2014, the Hornets finished the season as champions of the SWAC's East division with a record of 37–20, 21–3 in conference play. They qualified for the 2014 Southwestern Athletic Conference baseball tournament, and were eliminated in the finals. They failed to qualify for the 2014 NCAA Division I baseball tournament.

== Personnel ==
=== Roster ===
2015 Alabama State Hornets roster
Pitchers: 4 - Joseph Camacho - Junior; 5 - Hunter McIntosh - Junior; 6 - Michael Tellado - (redshirt) Junior; 7 - Mike Estevez - Senior; 12 - Ivanniel Vazquez - Freshman; 13 - Brandon Capels - Sophomore; 16 - Tyler Bender - Junior; 17 - Patrick Coffin - Sophomore; 18 - Logan Dyer - Senior; 22 - Armando Ruiz - Senior; 23 - Julio Valdez - Junior; 29 - Edgardo Rivera - Junior; 30 - Charles Taylor - Junior; 34 - Tyler Howe - (redshirt) Sophomore; 36 - Jorge Pantoja - Junior; 37 - Mike Montgomery - Senior; 41 - T.J. Renda - Senior; 43 - Darren Kelly - Freshman	Catchers: 19 - Chris Biocic - (redshirt) Sophomore; 35 - Manny Rodriguez - Senior; 38 - Hunter Allen - Freshman; Infielders: 1 - PJ Biocic - (redshirt) Senior; 2 - Kevin Olmeda - Sophomore; 10 - Einar Muniz - Senior; 11 - Yamil Pagan - Freshman; 25 - Ray Hernandez - Freshman; 26 - Ruben Garcia - Freshman; 28 - Julian Shields - Junior; 33 - PJ Harris - Freshman; 40 - Derron Simmons - Senior	Outfielders: 8 - Joseph Estrada - Freshman; 9 - Marcus Swint - Senior; 14 - Waldyvan Estrada - Senior; 15 - Cesar Rivera - (redshirt) Senior; 20 - Ryan Thompson - Junior; 28 - Sebastian Rivera - Freshman; 31 - Dillon Cooper - Junior; 42 - Chase Waters - Sophomore; 44 - Hunter Phillips - Freshman

=== Coaching staff ===
Name	Position	Seasons at Alabama State	Alma mater
Mervyl Melendez	Head coach	4	Bethune-Cookman University (1996)
José Vázquez	Associate head coach	4	Bethune-Cookman University (2003)
Drew Clark	Assistant coach	4	Bethune-Cookman University (2009)

== Schedule ==
Legend
	Alabama State win
	Alabama State loss
	Postponement
**Bold**	Alabama State team member

2015 Alabama State Hornets baseball game log
Regular season
February

Date	Opponent	Rank	Site/stadium	Score	Win	Loss	Save	Attendance	Overall record	SWAC record
February 13	vs. #12 Louisville		Bright House Field • Clearwater, FL	**L** 1–5	Funkhouser (1–0)	**Renda** (0–1)		375	0–1	–
February 14	vs. #17 Cal State Fullerton		Bright House Field • Clearwater, FL	**W** 3–2	**Camacho** (1–0)	Chambers (0–1)	**Ruiz** (1)	425	1–1	–
February 15	vs. South Florida		Bright House Field • Clearwater, FL	**L** 4–12	Lawson (1–0)	**Taylor** (0–1)		575	1–2	–
February 18	at Auburn		Plainsman Park • Auburn, AL	**L** 5–7	Lipscomb (1–0)	**Bender** (0–1)	Camp (2)	1,876	1–3	–
February 21	Florida A&M		Wheeler–Watkins Baseball Complex • Montgomery, AL	**W** 11–3	**Renda** (1–1)	Jarrell (0–1)		131	2–3	–
February 21	Florida A&M		Wheeler–Watkins Baseball Complex • Montgomery, AL	**W** 7–1	**Camacho** (2–0)	Carrasco (0–2)		131	3–3	–
February 22	Florida A&M		Wheeler–Watkins Baseball Complex • Montgomery, AL	Suspended Makeup date TBA						
February 24	South Alabama		Wheeler–Watkins Baseball Complex • Montgomery, AL	**L** 3–6	McKinley (1–0)	**Pantoja** (0–1)	Taylor (1)	75	3–4	–
February 25	UAB		Wheeler–Watkins Baseball Complex • Montgomery, AL	Postponed Rescheduled for May 6						
February 27	at The Citadel		Joseph P. Riley Jr. Park • Charleston, SC	**L** 8–9	Hunter (1–1)	**Ruiz** (0–1)		215	3–5	–
February 28	at The Citadel		Joseph P. Riley Jr. Park • Charleston, SC	**W** 15–14	**Estevez** (1–0)	Connell (0–1)	**Ruiz** (2)	226	4–5	–

March

Date	Opponent	Rank	Site/stadium	Score	Win	Loss	Save	Attendance	Overall record	SWAC record
March 1	at The Citadel		Joseph P. Riley Jr. Park • Charleston, SC	Cancelled						
March 3	Troy		Wheeler–Watkins Baseball Complex • Montgomery, AL	**W** 12–8	**Caples** (1–0)	Harris (0–1)		375	5–5	–
March 8	at Mississippi Valley State		Magnolia Field • Itta Bena, MS	**L** 2–3	Case (1–1)	**Renda** (1–2)		70	5–6	0–1
March 8	at Mississippi Valley State		Magnolia Field • Itta Bena, MS	**W** 12–2 ^{(7)}	**Camacho** (3–0)	Sheppeard (0–3)		115	6–6	1–1
March 9	at Mississippi Valley State		Magnolia Field • Itta Bena, MS	**W** 10–3	**McIntosh** (1–0)	Kinney (0–1)		150	7–6	2–1
March 15	at Alcorn State		McGowan Stadium • Lorman, MS	**W** 4–1	**Renda** (2–2)	Laird (1–3)	**Ruiz** (3)	103	8–6	3–1
March 15	at Alcorn State		McGowan Stadium • Lorman, MS	**W** 8–0	**Camacho** (4–0)	Belmont (1–4)		91	9–6	4–1
March 16	at Alcorn State		McGowan Stadium • Lorman, MS	**W** 12–1 ^{(7)}	**McIntosh** (2–0)	Walker (0–1)		130	10–6	5–1
March 17	at South Alabama		Eddie Stanky Field • Mobile, AL	**L** 2–9	Stephens (1–1)	**Caples** (1–1)		1,224	10–7	–
March 18	Jacksonville State		Wheeler–Watkins Baseball Complex • Montgomery, AL	**W** 3–1	**Tellado** (1–0)	McCreless (0–1)	**Ruiz** (4)	215	11–7	–
March 21	Alabama A&M		Wheeler–Watkins Baseball Complex • Montgomery, AL	**L** 3–6	Smith (2–2)	**Renda** (2–3)	Utterback (4)	118	11–8	5–2
March 21	Alabama A&M		Wheeler–Watkins Baseball Complex • Montgomery, AL	**W** 6–2	**Camacho** (5–0)	Ahrens (4–1)		87	12–8	6–2
March 22	Alabama A&M		Wheeler–Watkins Baseball Complex • Montgomery, AL	**W** 8–7	**Ruiz** (1–1)	Smith (1–3)		105	13–8	7–2
March 24	Samford		Wheeler–Watkins Baseball Complex • Montgomery, AL							
March 25	at Florida State		Dick Howser Stadium • Tallahassee, FL							
March 28	Jackson State		Wheeler–Watkins Baseball Complex • Montgomery, AL							
March 28	Jackson State		Wheeler–Watkins Baseball Complex • Montgomery, AL							
March 29	Jackson State		Wheeler–Watkins Baseball Complex • Montgomery, AL							
March 31	at Troy		Riddle–Pace Field • Troy, AL							

April

Date	Opponent	Rank	Site/stadium	Score	Win	Loss	Save	Attendance	Overall record	SWAC record
April 3	Savannah State		Wheeler–Watkins Baseball Complex • Montgomery, AL							
April 4	Savannah State		Wheeler–Watkins Baseball Complex • Montgomery, AL							
April 4	Savannah State		Wheeler–Watkins Baseball Complex • Montgomery, AL							
April 7	Jacksonville State		Wheeler–Watkins Baseball Complex • Montgomery, AL							
April 11	Mississippi Valley State		Wheeler–Watkins Baseball Complex • Montgomery, AL							
April 11	Mississippi Valley State		Wheeler–Watkins Baseball Complex • Montgomery, AL							
April 12	Mississippi Valley State		Wheeler–Watkins Baseball Complex • Montgomery, AL							
April 14	at Auburn		Plainsman Park • Auburn, AL							
April 15	at Jacksonville State		Rudy Abbott Field • Jacksonville, AL							
April 18	Alcorn State		Wheeler–Watkins Baseball Complex • Montgomery, AL							
April 18	Alcorn State		Wheeler–Watkins Baseball Complex • Montgomery, AL							
April 19	Alcorn State		Wheeler–Watkins Baseball Complex • Montgomery, AL							
April 21	at Samford		Joe Lee Griffin Stadium • Homewood, AL							
April 25	at Alabama A&M		Bulldog Field • Normal, AL							
April 25	at Alabama A&M		Bulldog Field • Normal, AL							
April 26	at Alabama A&M		Bulldog Field • Normal, AL							

May

Date	Opponent	Rank	Site/stadium	Score	Win	Loss	Save	Attendance	Overall record	SWAC record
May 2	at Jackson State		Braddy Field • Jackson, MS							
May 2	at Jackson State		Braddy Field • Jackson, MS							
May 3	at Jackson State		Braddy Field • Jackson, MS							
May 5	at UAB		Jerry D. Young Memorial Field • Birmingham, AL							
May 6	UAB		Wheeler–Watkins Baseball Complex • Montgomery, AL							

Postseason
SWAC Tournament

#	Date	Opponent	Rank	Site/stadium	Score	Win	Loss	Save	Attendance	Overall record	Tourn. Record
	May 13	TBD		Wesley Barrow Stadium • New Orleans, LA							

All rankings from Collegiate Baseball.
