= Southwestern Athletic Conference softball tournament =

- Conference softball championship
- Sport: Softball
- Conference: Southwestern Athletic Conference
- Number of teams: 8
- Format: Double-elimination tournament
- Current stadium: Gulfport Sportsplex
- Current location: Gulfport, Mississippi
- Played: 1997–present
- Last contest: 2026
- Current champion: Florida A&M
- Most championships: Mississippi Valley State (8)

The Southwestern Athletic Conference softball tournament (sometimes known simply as the SWAC Tournament) is the conference championship tournament in college softball for the Southwestern Athletic Conference. The winner receives the conference's automatic bid to the NCAA Division I softball tournament.

== Tournament ==
The top 8 teams compete in the double-elimination tournament, with the top seed from one division facing the fourth seed from the opposite in the first round and so on.

== Champions ==
=== Year-by-year ===
Year	School	Venue	MVP
1997	Alcorn State/Grambling State		
1998	Prairie View A&M		
1999	Southern		
2000	Texas Southern		
2001	Grambling State		
2002	Alabama A&M		
2003	Southern		
2004	Mississippi Valley State		
2005	Mississippi Valley State		
2006	Mississippi Valley State		
2007	Mississippi Valley State		
2008	Mississippi Valley State		
2009	Mississippi Valley State	Southern Miss Softball Complex • Hattiesburg, Mississippi	Angelia Jones, Mississippi Valley State
2010	Alcorn State	Wilson Morgan Park • Decatur, Alabama	Adriana Harrington, Alcorn State
2011	Jackson State	Wilson Morgan Park • Decatur, Alabama	Wendi Reed, Jackson State
2012	Mississippi Valley State	Wilson Morgan Park • Decatur, Alabama	Nicole Burr, Mississippi Valley State
2013	Mississippi Valley State	Wilson Morgan Park • Decatur, Alabama	Alexandria Robertson, Mississippi Valley State
2014	Texas Southern	Wilson Morgan Park • Decatur, Alabama	Thomasina Garza, Texas Southern
2015	Texas Southern	Wilson Morgan Park • Decatur, Alabama	Thomasina Garza, Texas Southern
2016	Alabama State	Shea Brothers Softball Complex • Irondale, Alabama	Kendall Core, Alabama State
2017	Texas Southern	Barbara Williams Softball Complex • Montgomery, Alabama	Lauren Rodriguez, Texas Southern
2018	Prairie View A&M	Barbara Williams Softball Complex • Montgomery, Alabama	Laurisa Hernandez, Prairie View A&M
2019	Alabama State	Barbara Williams Softball Complex • Montgomery, Alabama	Justine Jean, Alabama State
2020	Cancelled due to the coronavirus pandemic		
2021	Alabama State	Gulfport Sportsplex • Gulfport, Mississippi	Skyler Sullivan, Alabama State
2022	Prairie View A&M	Gulfport Sportsplex • Gulfport, Mississippi	Biviana Figueroa, Prairie View A&M
2023	Prairie View A&M	Gulfport Sportsplex • Gulfport, Mississippi	Jerrica Rojas, Prairie View A&M
2024	Jackson State	Gulfport Sportsplex • Gulfport, Mississippi	Jace Jackson, Jackson State
2025	Jackson State	Gulfport Sportsplex • Gulfport, Mississippi	Brooklyn Morris, Jackson State
2026	Florida A&M	Gulfport Sportsplex • Gulfport, Mississippi	Samantha Smith, Florida A&M

=== By school ===
School	Championships	Years
Mississippi Valley State	8	2004, 2005, 2006, 2007, 2008, 2009, 2012, 2013
Prairie View A&M	4	1998, 2018, 2022, 2023
Texas Southern	4	2000, 2014, 2015, 2017
Jackson State	3	2011, 2024, 2025
Alabama State	3	2016, 2019, 2021
Alcorn State	2	1997, 2010
Grambling State	2	1997, 2001
Southern	2	1999, 2003
Alabama A&M	1	2002
Florida A&M	1	2026
