= 2015 Southwestern Athletic Conference baseball tournament =

- Teams: 8
- Format: Double elimination
- Finals site: Wesley Barrow Stadium; New Orleans, LA
- Champions: Texas Southern (3rd title)
- Winning coach: Michael Robertson (1st title)
- Television: ESPN3

2015 Southwestern Athletic Conference baseball standings
| | Conf. | | | | | | Overall |
| Team | W | | L | | T | PCT | W | | L | | T | PCT |
|---|---|---|---|---|---|---|---|---|---|---|---|---|
East
| Alabama State ^{x}‍‍‍ | 18 | – | 6 | – | 0 | .750 | 30 | – | 17 | – | 0 | .638 |
| Alabama A&M ‍‍‍ | 16 | – | 8 | – | 0 | .667 | 25 | – | 26 | – | 0 | .490 |
| Jackson State ‍‍‍ | 15 | – | 9 | – | 0 | .625 | 30 | – | 22 | – | 0 | .577 |
| Alcorn State ‍‍‍ | 8 | – | 17 | – | 0 | .320 | 15 | – | 38 | – | 0 | .283 |
| Mississippi Valley State* ‍‍‍ | 4 | – | 20 | – | 0 | .167 | 7 | – | 36 | – | 1 | .170 |
West
| Arkansas–Pine Bluff ^{x}‍‍‍ | 16 | – | 6 | – | 0 | .727 | 24 | – | 16 | – | 0 | .600 |
| Texas Southern ‍‍‍ | 16 | – | 7 | – | 0 | .696 | 26 | – | 16 | – | 0 | .619 |
| Southern* ‍‍‍ | 13 | – | 8 | – | 0 | .619 | 17 | – | 22 | – | 0 | .436 |
| Grambling State ‍‍‍ | 7 | – | 18 | – | 0 | .280 | 9 | – | 34 | – | 0 | .209 |
| Prairie View A&M ‍‍‍ | 5 | – | 19 | – | 0 | .208 | 15 | – | 34 | – | 0 | .306 |
‡ – Tournament champion As of May 7, 2015; Rankings from Collegiate Baseball; *Ineligible for postseason play due to APR penalties

The 2015 Southwestern Athletic Conference baseball tournament was held at Wesley Barrow Stadium in New Orleans, Louisiana, from May 13 through 17. Texas Southern won their third conference title, and first since 2008, to earn the conference's automatic bid to the 2015 NCAA Division I baseball tournament.

The double elimination tournament featured four teams from each division. Mississippi Valley State, from the East Division was ineligible for the postseason due to Academic Progress Rate penalties. Southern, from the West Division, was originally ineligible for postseason play in all sports, including baseball, due to failing to supply usable data to the NCAA. However, the Jaguars were able to compete in the tournament in place of Arkansas–Pine Bluff.

== Seeding and format ==
The four eligible teams in each division will be seeded one through four, with the top seed from each division facing the fourth seed from the opposite division in the first round, and so on. The teams then play a two bracket, double-elimination tournament with a one-game final between the winners of each bracket.

| Team | W | L | Pct | GB | Seed |
|---|---|---|---|---|---|
East Division
| Alabama State | 18 | 6 | .750 | – | 1E |
| Alabama A&M | 16 | 8 | .667 | 2 | 2E |
| Jackson State | 15 | 9 | .625 | 3 | 3E |
| Alcorn State | 8 | 17 | .320 | 10.5 | 4E |
| Mississippi Valley State | 4 | 20 | .167 | 14 | — |

| Team | W | L | Pct | GB | Seed |
|---|---|---|---|---|---|
West Division
| Arkansas–Pine Bluff | 16 | 6 | .727 | – | — |
| Texas Southern | 16 | 7 | .696 | 0.5 | 1W |
| Southern | 13 | 8 | .619 | 2.5 | 2W |
| Grambling State | 7 | 18 | .280 | 10.5 | 3W |
| Prairie View A&M | 5 | 19 | .208 | 12 | 4W |

== Bracket ==
First round
1E | Alabama State | 5
4W | Prairie View A&M | 4
2W | Southern | 10
3E | Jackson State | 5
4W | Prairie View A&M | 1
3E | Jackson State | 10
1W | Texas Southern | 5
4E | Alcorn State | 2
2E | Alabama A&M | 3
3W | Grambling State | 8
4E | Alcorn State | 13^{7}
2E | Alabama A&M | 3

Second round
1E | Alabama State | 12
2W | Southern | 13^{10}
1E | Alabama State | 1
3E | Jackson State | 3
1W | Texas Southern | 0
3W | Grambling State | 6
1W | Texas Southern | 10
4E | Alcorn State | 0

Semifinals
2W | Southern | 6 | –
3E | Jackson State | 5 | –
3W | Grambling State | 1 | 4
1W | Texas Southern | 4 | 7

Final
2W | Southern | 0
1W | Texas Southern | 10
