= Aaron Stevens =

Aaron Stevens may refer to:

- Aaron Fletcher Stevens (1819–1887), American Civil War soldier
- Aaron Dwight Stevens (1831–1860), associate of the abolitionist John Brown, executed after the raid on Harpers Ferry, West Virginia in 1859
- Aaron Stevens, a wrestler born in 1982, who goes by the name of Aron Stevens in NWA
- Aaron Stevens (baseball), American college baseball coach and player
