= 2025 Southwestern Athletic Conference baseball tournament =

- Teams: 8
- Format: Double-elimination
- Finals site: Rickwood Field; Birmingham, Alabama
- Champions: Bethune–Cookman (14th title)
- Winning coach: Jonathan Hernandez (1st title)
- MVP: Daniel Figueroa (Bethune-Cookman)
- Television: ESPN+

2025 Southwestern Athletic Conference baseball standings
	Conf.				Overall
Team	W		L	PCT	W		L	PCT
Bethune–Cookman ‍†‍‡‍^{y}	24	–	5	.828	37	–	23	.617
Florida A&M ‍‍‍	24	–	6	.800	33	–	25	.569
Alabama State ‍‍‍	21	–	9	.700	31	–	29	.517
Arkansas–Pine Bluff ‍‍‍	17	–	9	.654	19	–	34	.358
Grambling State ‍‍‍	18	–	11	.621	26	–	28	.481
Jackson State ‍‍‍	16	–	12	.571	29	–	21	.580
Southern ‍‍‍	15	–	13	.536	24	–	27	.471
Texas Southern ‍‍‍	15	–	15	.500	22	–	32	.407
Prairie View A&M ‍‍‍	13	–	14	.481	17	–	36	.321
Mississippi Valley State ‍‍‍	7	–	23	.233	12	–	29	.293
Alabama A&M ‍‍‍	2	–	27	.069	10	–	40	.200
Alcorn State ‍‍‍	1	–	29	.033	6	–	43	.122
† – Conference champion ‡ – Tournament champion y – Invited to the NCAA Tournament; As of May 31, 2025; Rankings from D1Baseball

The 2025 Southwestern Athletic Conference baseball tournament was held from May 21 through 25 at Rickwood Field in Birmingham, Alabama. The top eight regular season finishers of the conference's twelve teams met in the double-elimination tournament, and were split into two double-elimination brackets of four. The winner of each bracket will then played a single-game championship.

== Seeding and format ==
The top eight finishers of the league's twelve teams qualify for the double-elimination tournament. Teams are seeded based on conference winning percentage, with the first tiebreaker being head-to-head record.

== Bracket ==
First round
1	Bethune-Cookman	5
8	Texas Southern	3
3	Alabama State	7
6	Jackson State	6
8	Texas Southern	6
6	Jackson State	12
2	Florida A&M	9
7	Southern	1
4	Arkansas-Pine Bluff	6
5	Grambling State	13
4	Arkansas-Pine Bluff	11
7	Southern	17

Second round
1	Bethune-Cookman	9
3	Alabama State	8
6	Jackson State	3
3	Alabama State	5
2	Florida A&M	14^{8}
5	Grambling State	4
5	Grambling State	16^{7}
7	Southern	2

Semifinals
1	Bethune–Cookman	8	–
3	Alabama State	7	–
2	Florida A&M	0	9
5	Grambling State	13^{7}	1

Finals
1	Bethune–Cookman	11
2	Florida A&M	9

== Schedule ==
Game	Time*	Matchup^{#}	Score	Notes	Reference
Wednesday, May 21
1	9:00 am	No. 8 Texas Southern vs No. 1 Bethune-Cookman	3−5		
2	12:00 pm	No. 7 Southern vs No. 2 Florida A&M	1−9		
3	3:00 pm	No. 6 Jackson State vs No. 3 Alabama State	6−7		
4	6:00 pm	No. 5 Grambling State vs No. 4 Arkansas-Pine Bluff	13−6		
Thursday, May 22
5	9:00 am	No. 8 Texas Southern vs No. 6 Jackson State	6−12	Texas Southern Eliminated	
6	12:00 pm	No. 7 Southern vs No. 4 Arkansas-Pine Bluff	17−11	Arkansas-Pine Bluff Eliminated	
7	3:00 pm	No. 1 Bethune-Cookman vs No. 3 Alabama State	9−8		
8	6:00 pm	No. 2 Florida A&M vs No. 5 Grambling State	14−4 (F/8)		
Friday, May 23
9	9:00 am	No. 6 Jackson State vs No. 3 Alabama State	3−5	Jackson State Eliminated	
10	12:00 pm	No. 7 Southern vs No. 5 Grambling State	16−2 (F/7)	Southern Eliminated	
11	3:00 pm	No. 3 Alabama State vs No. 1 Bethune-Cookman	7−8 (F/10)	Alabama State Eliminated	
12	6:00 pm	No. 5 Grambling State vs No. 2 Florida A&M	13−0 (F/7)		
Saturday, May 24
13	2:30 pm	No. 5 Grambling State vs No. 2 Florida A&M	1−9	Grambling State Eliminated	
Sunday, May 25
14	1:00 pm	No. 2 Florida A&M vs No. 1 Bethune-Cookman			

== All–Tournament Team ==
Player	Team
Juan Cruz	Alabama State
Kameron Douglas	Alabama State
Cameron Hill	Grambling State
Trey Bridges	Grambling State
William Brown	Florida A&M
Colton Ryals	Florida A&M
Cody Williams	Florida A&M
Justin Crews	Florida A&M
Jeter Polledo	Bethune-Cookman
Sergio Rivera	Bethune-Cookman
Edwin Sanchez	Bethune-Cookman
**Daniel Figueroa**	Bethune-Cookman

MVP in bold
