= 2021 Southwestern Athletic Conference softball tournament =

- Teams: 8
- Format: Double-elimination tournament
- Finals site: Gulfport Sportsplex; Gulfport, Mississippi
- Champions: Alabama State (3 title)

The 2021 Southwestern Athletic Conference tournament was held at the Gulfport Sportsplex in Gulfport, Mississippi from May 11 through May 14, 2021. The tournament winner earned the SWAC's automatic bid to the 2021 NCAA Division I softball tournament

== Tournament ==
=== Bracket ===
Upper round 1	Upper round 2	Upper final	Final
E2	Alabama State	11
W3	Grambling State	0
E2	Alabama State	2
W1	Texas Southern	0
W1	Texas Southern	3
E4	Alcorn State	2
E2	Alabama State	7
W4	Southern	6
W2	Prairie View A&M	2
E3	Alabama A&M	0
W2	Prairie View A&M	5
W4	Southern	7
E1	Jackson State	3
W4	Southern	4	E2	Alabama State	8
E4	Alcorn State	1
Lower round 1	Lower round 2	Lower round 3	Lower final
E4	Alcorn State	6
W3	Grambling State	2	W1	Texas Southern	5	W4	Southern	6
E4	Alcorn State	8	E4	Alcorn State	8	E4	Alcorn State	7
E1	Jackson State	3
E1	Jackson State	2
E3	Alabama A&M	2	W2	Prairie View A&M	1
E1	Jackson State	4
