= Dave McDaniels =

American gridiron football player (1945–2012)

No. 80, 83
- Position: Wide receiver

Personal information
- Born: April 9, 1945; Miami, Florida, U.S.
- Died: June 14, 2012 (aged 67); Miami, Florida, U.S.
- Listed height: 6 ft 4 in (1.93 m)
- Listed weight: 200 lb (91 kg)

Career information
- High school: Miami Northwestern
- College: Mississippi Valley State (1964-1967)
- NFL draft: 1968: 2nd round, 45th overall pick

Career history
- Dallas Cowboys (1968); Philadelphia Eagles (1969)*; Chicago Bears (1969)*; Los Angeles Rams (1969)*; New Orleans Saints (1969)*; Richmond Roadrunners (1969); Montreal Alouettes (1970)*; BC Lions (1970)*
- * Offseason or practice squad member only

Career NFL statistics
- Games played: 4
- Stats at Pro Football Reference

Dave McDaniels (April 9, 1945 – June 14, 2012) was an American professional football wide receiver in the National Football League (NFL) for the Dallas Cowboys. He played college football at Mississippi Valley State University.

== Early life ==
McDaniels attended Miami Northwestern Senior High School. He accepted a scholarship from Mississippi Valley State University, where he played at wide receiver. As a freshman, he made 9 receptions for 200 yards. The next year he had 34 receptions for 496 yards and 3 touchdowns.

As a junior, he posted 65 receptions for 1,236 yards (led the NAIA) and 7 touchdowns. His 137.3 yards per game broke an NAIA record. In his last year he tallied 51 receptions for 800 yards and 2 touchdowns.

He was inducted into the Mississippi Valley State University Athletics Hall of Fame.

== Professional career ==
=== Dallas Cowboys ===
McDaniels was selected in the second round (45th overall) of the 1968 NFL/AFL draft by the Dallas Cowboys, becoming the highest drafted player from Mississippi Valley State University, until Jerry Rice in 1985. In training camp he was tried both at wide receiver and tight end.

He had a disappointing rookie season, playing in only 4 games and spending most of the year on the team's taxi squad. He was traded to the Philadelphia Eagles for Mike Ditka on January 28, 1969.

=== Philadelphia Eagles ===
On July 31, 1969, he was traded during training camp to the Chicago Bears in exchange for a seven-round pick (#158-Terry Brennan).

=== Chicago Bears ===
McDaniels lasted just a week with the Chicago Bears before being traded to the Los Angeles Rams, in exchange for a seven-round draft choice (#176-Dennis Ferris) on August 11, 1969.

=== Los Angeles Rams ===
He was released after one month with the Los Angeles Rams on August 25, 1969.

=== New Orleans Saints ===
McDaniels was claimed by the New Orleans Saints, but he was released before the start of the 1969 season.

=== Montreal Alouettes ===
In 1970, he signed with the Montreal Alouettes of the Canadian Football League. On July 7, his rights were sold to the British Columbia Lions.

== Personal life ==
After football, he taught physical education in the Richmond Public School District and the Prince George's County Public Schools. He died on June 14, 2012.
