= WVSD =

- Itta Bena, Mississippi; United States
- Frequency: 91.7 MHz
- Branding: "WVSD 91.7 FM"

Programming
- Format: Variety

Ownership
- Owner: Mississippi Valley State University

Technical information
- Licensing authority: FCC
- Facility ID: 43178
- Class: A
- ERP: 3,000 watts
- HAAT: 89 metres (292 ft)
- Transmitter coordinates: 33°31′5″N 90°20′38″W

Links
- Public license information: Public file; LMS
- Webcast: Listen Live
- Website: www.mvsu.edu/radio-station-home

WVSD (91.7 FM) is a radio station licensed to serve the community of Itta Bena, Mississippi. The station is owned by Mississippi Valley State University, and airs a variety format.

The station was assigned the WVSD call letters by the Federal Communications Commission on September 12, 1989.
