= Barret Rey =

American college baseball coach

Playing career
- 1994–1997: Southern
- Position: P

Coaching career (HC unless noted)
- 1998–2006: Southern (Asst.)
- 2007–2009: Grambling State
- 2010–2015: Alcorn State
- 2016: Morgan City (LA)

Administrative career (AD unless noted)
- 2017–present: New Orleans (LA) St. Augustine

Accomplishments and honors

Awards
- SWAC Coach of the Year (2011)

Barret L. Rey is an American college baseball coach. Rey previously served as head coach of the Grambling State Tigers baseball team from 2007 through 2009 and the Alcorn State Braves baseball team from 2010 through 2015.

== Southern ==
Rey was a four-year letterman as a pitcher at Southern, where he helped lead the Jaguars to a pair of NCAA Regional appearances, earned All-SWAC twice, and recorded a 21–6 record with 156 strikeouts, 13 complete games, and 3 shutouts. Rey remains among the school's leaders in many pitching categories, and is best remembered for his 7–0 freshman campaign. After completing his eligibility, Rey served one year as a graduate assistant while completing his degree, then became a full-time assistant with the Jaguars. The Jaguars continued their dominance of the SWAC, winning six Southwestern Athletic Conference baseball tournament titles in nine years. Rey added recruiting coordinator duties, and was instrumental in recruiting and coaching 21 future draft picks, including Rickie Weeks to Southern. Rey also completed a master's degree at Southern in 2003.

== Head coaching career ==
Following the 2006 season, Rey was hired as head coach at Grambling State. The Tigers had not appeared in the SWAC Tournament in seven years, and had finished just 6–36 the previous season. Under Rey, the Tigers qualified for a pair of SWAC Tournaments in three years, and compiled a record of 56–94. Citing a desire to be closer to his wife and children, Rey accepted the head coaching job at SWAC rival Alcorn State beginning in 2010. In his second season, the Braves claimed the top record in the league, won the East Division, and won the SWAC Tournament to qualify for their first NCAA Regional. Rey was named SWAC Coach of the Year for his efforts.

== Head coaching record ==
Record table
Season	Team	Overall	Conference	Standing	Postseason
Grambling State (Southwestern Athletic Conference) (2007–2009)
2007	Grambling State	18–29			
2008	Grambling State	21–28	15–9	2nd West (5)	
2009	Grambling State	17–37	10–13	3rd West (5)	
Grambling State:		56–94			
Alcorn State (Southwestern Athletic Conference) (2010–2014)
2010	Alcorn State	27–28	15–8	3rd East (5)	
2011	Alcorn State	27–30	19–4	1st East (5)	NCAA Regional
2012	Alcorn State	18–37	14–10	T-2nd East (5)	SWAC tournament (Note: The top four teams in each five team division qualified for the SWAC Tournament in 2012.)
2013	Alcorn State	16–41	14–10	3rd East (5)	SWAC tournament (Note: The top four teams in each five team division qualified for the SWAC Tournament in 2013.)
2014	Alcorn State	11–42	10–13	3rd East (5)	SWAC tournament (Note: The top four teams in each five team division qualified for the SWAC Tournament in 2014.)
Alcorn State:		99–178	72–45		
Total:		155–272			
National champion Postseason invitational champion Conference regular season champion Conference regular season and conference tournament champion Division regular season champion Division regular season and conference tournament champion Conference tournament champion

== See also ==
- List of current NCAA Division I baseball coaches
