= Milton Barney Jr. =

American baseball coach

Current position
- Title: Head coach
- Team: Miles
- Conference: SIAC
- Record: 22–26

Biographical details
- Born: 1988 (age 37–38); Gulfport, Mississippi, U.S.

Playing career
- 2007: Southern
- 2008–2010: Grambling State
- Position: Infielder

Coaching career (HC unless noted)
- 2011: Alcorn State (Asst)
- 2023: Mississippi Valley State
- 2024–present: Miles

Head coaching record
- Overall: 37–63
- Tournaments: NCAA: 0–0

Milton Jeffery Barney Jr. (born 1988) is a baseball coach and former infielder, who is the current head baseball coach of the Miles Golden Bears. He played college baseball at Southern in 2007 and Grambling State from 2008 to 2010. He then served as the head baseball coach of the Mississippi Valley State Delta Devils (2023)

== Playing career ==
Barney grew up in Gulfport, Mississippi, where he attended Gulfport High School, where he was a letterwinner for the Admirals in baseball and football. Barney attended Southern University following high school, where he appeared in 20 games for the Jaguars, registering 12 hits while driving in 10 RBI. He would transfer to Grambling State, where he would finish out his career.

== Coaching career ==
Barney began his coaching career as an assistant coach for the Alcorn State Braves, helping the team win the 2011 Southwestern Athletic Conference title.

On August 11, 2022, Barney was named the head baseball coach of the Mississippi Valley State Delta Devils.

== Head coaching record ==
Record table
Season	Team	Overall	Conference	Standing	Postseason
Mississippi Valley State Delta Devils (Southwestern Athletic Conference) (2023)
2023	Mississippi Valley State	15–37	7–23	10th	
Mississippi Valley State:		15–37	7–23		
Miles Golden Bears (Southern Intercollegiate Athletic Conference) (2024–present)
2024	Miles	22–26	20–12	10th	
Miles:		22–26	20–12		
Total:		37–63			

== Personal life ==
He is the son of former National Football League (NFL) and Arena Football League wide receiver, Milton Barney and the great nephew of NFL Hall of Famer, Lem Barney.
