= Mississippi Valley State Delta Devils and Devilettes =

College athletics

- University: Mississippi Valley State University
- Nickname: Delta Devils and Devilettes
- NCAA: Division I (FCS)
- Conference: Southwestern Athletic Conference; Mid-Eastern Athletic Conference (women's flag football)
- Athletic director: George Ivory (interim)
- Location: Itta Bena, Mississippi
- Varsity teams: 13
- Football stadium: Rice–Totten Stadium
- Basketball arena: Harrison HPER Complex
- Baseball stadium: Magnolia Field
- Softball stadium: MVSU Softball Field
- Volleyball arena: Harrison HPER Complex
- Colors: Forest green and white
- Website: mvsusports.com

The Mississippi Valley State Delta Devils and Devilettes (also MVSU and Mississippi Valley) represent Mississippi Valley State University in Itta Bena, Mississippi in intercollegiate athletics. They field thirteen teams including men and women's basketball, cross country, golf, and track and field; women's-only soccer, softball, and volleyball; and men's-only baseball and football. The Delta Devils and Devilettes compete in NCAA Division I and are members of the Southwestern Athletic Conference.

== Teams ==
Men	Women
Baseball	Basketball
Basketball	Cross country
Cross country	Flag football
Football	Tennis
Tennis	Softball
Track & field	Track & field
	Volleyball

== National championships ==
=== Team ===
Sport	Association	Division	Year	Opponent/Runner-up	Score
Men's outdoor track and field (2)	NAIA	Single	1980	Abilene Christian	66–61 (+5)
Men's outdoor track and field (2)	NAIA	Single	1981	Texas Southern	62–59 (+3)
