= Carlton Hardy =

American college baseball coach (born 1971)

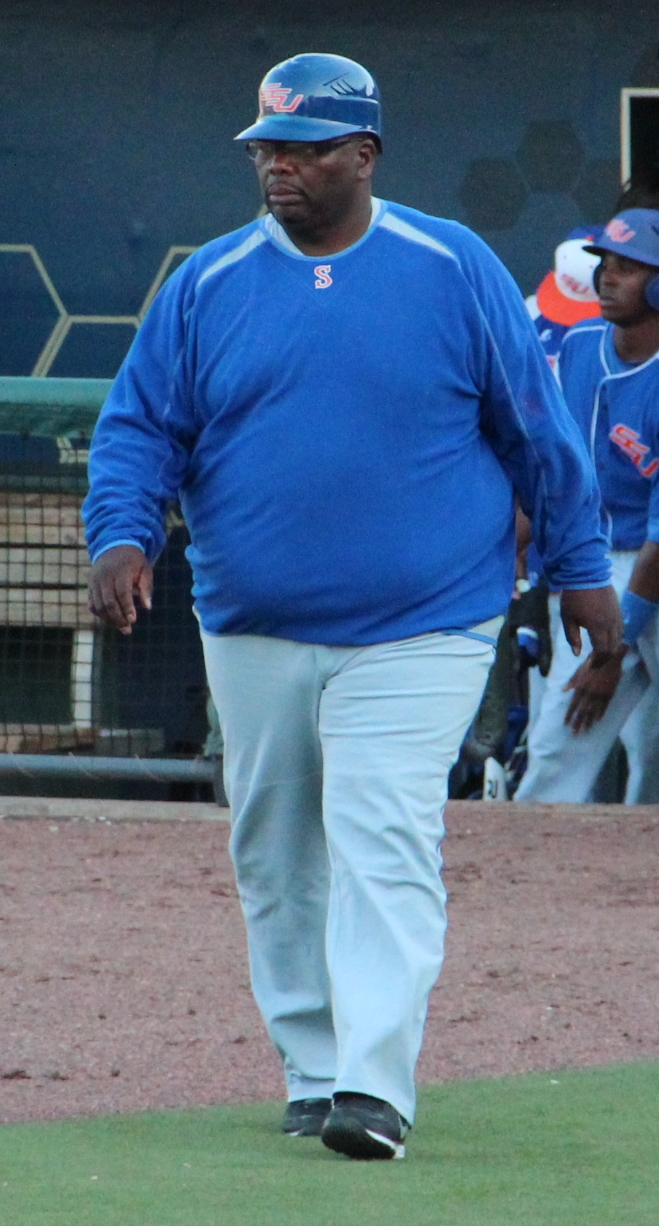
- Hardy in 2014

Current position
- Title: Head coach
- Team: Alcorn State
- Conference: SWAC
- Record: 15–85

Biographical details
- Born: July 24, 1971 (age 55); Los Angeles, California, U.S.
- Education: Grambling State University (B.S., 1993) (M.S., 1995)

Playing career

Baseball
- 1989–1991: Grambling State
- 1991: Martinsville Phillies
- Position: Third baseman

Coaching career (HC unless noted)

Football
- 1999–2004: Olivet (assistant)

Baseball
- 1998–1999: Talladega
- 2000–2005: Olivet
- 2006–2024: Savannah State
- 2025–present: Alcorn State

Head coaching record
- Overall: 527–667 (NCAA) 34–18 (NAIA)

Accomplishments and honors

Championships
- MEAC Conference Tournament (2013); SIAC Regular Season (2022)

Awards
- MEAC Coach of the Year (2013); SIAC Coach of the Year (2022); (GADC) Division I College Baseball Coach of the Year (2013); MEAC Outstanding Coach of the Year (2013)

Carlton Hardy (born July 24, 1971) is an American college baseball coach. He is the head baseball coach at Alcorn State University.

== College ==
Hardy played college baseball at Grambling State from 1989 to 1991. At Grambling State, Hardy was First Team All Conference in 1990 and 1991. He graduated from Grambling State with a B.S in Computer Information Systems and a Master of Science degree in Sports Administration.

== Career ==
Hardy played for the Martinsville Phillies in 1991 where he had a batting average of .133 and a fielding percentage of .921 at third base.

Hardy's coaching career began in 1998 as the Head coach of Talladega of the NAIA. He coached Talladega College for two seasons, leading the team to a 34–18 record (and the most wins in school history up to that point).

Hardy's next head coaching job was as the head coach of Olivet where he coached from 2000 to 2005 and turned around the program Hardy coached Olivet to a 105–123 record in his six seasons with the club.

Savannah State hired Hardy as their head coach in 2006.

In July 2006, Hardy's alma mater, Grambling State hired Hardy as their head coach before Hardy decided to stay with Savannah State.

On August 8, 2024, Hardy was hired by Alcorn State as their new head coach.

Hardy is currently a member of the USA Today Sports board of coaches.

== Head coaching record ==
Record table
Season	Team	Overall	Conference	Standing	Postseason
Talladega College Tornadoes (HBCUAC) (1998–1999)
1998	Talladgea College				
1999	Talladgea College	34–18			NAIA Sectional
Talladega College (NAIA):		34–18			
Olivet Comets (MIAA) (2000–2005)
2000	Olivet College	15–25	6–12	6th	
2001	Olivet College	12–25	6–12	6th	
2002	Olivet College	18–18	6–12	5th	
2003	Olivet College	23–17	21–8	2nd	
2004	Olivet College	16–22	8–10	5th	
2005	Olivet College	21–16	10–11	T–4th	
Olivet College:		105–123	48–63		
Savannah State Tigers (Independent) (2006–2011)
2006	Savannah State	30–19			
2007	Savannah State	31–23			
2008	Savannah State	20–25			
2009	Savannah State	25–26			
2010	Savannah State	24–26			
2011	Savannah State	29–23			
Savannah State:					
Savannah State Tigers (MEAC) (2012–2019)
2012	Savannah State	19–34	11–19	4th (South)	MEAC tournament
2013	Savannah State	33–23	17–7	T–1st (South)	NCAA Regional
2014	Savannah State	22–31	11–13	4th (South)	MEAC tournament
2015	Savannah State	21–33	12–12	3rd (South)	MEAC tournament
2016	Savannah State	12–40	7–17	(South)	
2017	Savannah State	12–39	3–21	(South)	
2018	Savannah State	7–34	4–20	(South)	
2019	Savannah State	13–27–1	10–14	3rd (South)	MEAC tournament
Savannah State:			75–123		
Savannah State Tigers (SIAC) (2020–2024)
2020	Savannah State	7–8			
2021	Savannah State	4–7			HBCU Black College Small School World Series (6th Place)
2022	Savannah State	34–12	28–2	1st	SIAC tournament
2023	Savannah State	33–14	25–7	2nd	SIAC tournament
2024	Savannah State	31–15	21–12	4th	SIAC tournament
Savannah State:		407–459	74–21		
[Alcorn State Braves (SWAC) (2025–present)
2025	Alcorn State	6–43	1–29	12th	
2026	Alcorn State	9–42	3–25	12th	
Alcorn State:		15–85	4–54		
Total:		527–667			
National champion Postseason invitational champion Conference regular season champion Conference regular season and conference tournament champion Division regular season champion Division regular season and conference tournament champion Conference tournament champion
