= C. J. Bilbrey =

American baseball coach

Current position
- Title: Head coach
- Team: Mississippi Valley State
- Conference: SWAC
- Record: 36–99

Biographical details
- Born: 1985 (age 40–41)

Playing career
- 2003–2007: Harris–Stowe State
- Position: Pitcher

Coaching career (HC unless noted)
- 2008: North Central Missouri (Asst)
- 2009–2012: Maryville (Asst)
- 2013: SIU Edwardsville (Asst)
- 2014–2015: Harris–Stowe State (Asst)
- 2016–2021: Harris–Stowe State
- 2022: Lindenwood (Asst)
- 2023: St. Louis C.C. (P)
- 2024–present: Mississippi Valley State

Head coaching record
- Overall: 36–99 (NCAA) 114–129 (NAIA)

Curtis Wayne Bilbrey Jr. (born 1985) is an American baseball coach and former pitcher who is the current head baseball coach for the Mississippi Valley State Delta Devils. He played college baseball at Harris–Stowe State from 2004 to 2007. He then served as the head coach of Harris–Stowe State from 2016 to 2021.

== Playing career ==
After graduating high school, Bilbrey had been committed to a junior college to play baseball, but just weeks prior to his arrival at the school, he was informed that the coaching staff had given his scholarship to another player. He began calling local colleges, looking for an opportunity to play baseball, which is where he found Harris–Stowe State. As a senior in 2007, he went 1-2 in 13 outings, totaling 19 innings pitched.

== Coaching career ==
Bilbrey started his coaching career immediately following the conclusion of his playing career. He was named an assistant at North Central Missouri College in 2008. The following season, Bilbrey joined the coaching staff of the Maryville Saints, where he would spend the next 4 years as an assistant. In 2013, Bilbrey joined Tony Stoecklin's staff at SIU Edwardsville, making Bilbrey's first stop at the Division I level. In 2014, he returned this alma mater, Harris–Stowe State as an assistant.

Two seasons after returning to Harris–Stowe State, head coach David Estes retired, and Bilbrey was named the head baseball coach of the Hornets. On March 16, 2021, the Hornets fired Bilbrey, just 10 games into the season.

On July 21, 2023, Bilbrey was named the head baseball coach of the Mississippi Valley State Delta Devils baseball program.

== Head coaching record ==
Record table
Season	Team	Overall	Conference	Standing	Postseason
Harris–Stowe State Hornets (American Midwest Conference) (2016–2021)
2016	Harris–Stowe State	18–33	8–19	9th	
2017	Harris–Stowe State	30–20	15–11	4th	
2018	Harris–Stowe State	30–24	15–14	6th	
2019	Harris–Stowe State	20–30	13–17	7th	
2020	Harris–Stowe State	12–16	3–6	7th	Season canceled due to COVID-19
2021	Harris–Stowe State	4–6	0–0		
Harris–Stowe State (NAIA):		114–129	54–67		
Mississippi Valley State Delta Devils (Southwestern Athletic Conference) (2024–present)
2024	Mississippi Valley State	12–34	7–23	6th (East)	
2025	Mississippi Valley State	12–28	7–22	10th	
2026	Mississippi Valley State	12–37	8–22	10th	
Mississippi Valley State:		36–99	22–67		
Total:		36–99			
