= Bretton Richardson =

American baseball player and coach

Current position
- Title: Assistant coach
- Team: Florida A&M
- Conference: SWAC

Playing career
- 1990–1993: Florida A&M
- Position: Catcher

Coaching career (HC unless noted)
- 1994–1997: Tallahassee (FL) Lincoln (asst)
- 1998–1999: Florida A&M (GA)
- 2000–2010: Florida A&M (asst)
- 2011: Florida A&M (Interim HC)
- 2013–2015: Florida A&M (asst)
- 2016–2021: Alcorn State
- 2022–present: Florida A&M (asst)

Head coaching record
- Overall: 84–206
- Tournaments: MEAC 0–2; SWAC 3–8; NCAA: 0–0

Bretton Richardson is an American baseball coach and former catcher, who is the a current assistant coach for the Florida A&M Rattlers. He played college baseball at Florida A&M. Richardson then served as the head coach of the Florida A&M Rattlers (2011) and the Alcorn State Braves (2016–2021).

== Early life ==
Richardson attended Lincoln High School in Tallahassee, Florida. Richardson then accepted a scholarship to attend Florida A&M University. He caught for the Rattlers, who won the Mid-Eastern Athletic Conference (MEAC) in 1990, 1991 & 1992.

== Coaching career ==
Richardson spent four seasons as an assistant baseball coach at Lincoln High School. In 1998, he joined the Florida A&M staff as a graduate assistant. In 2000, he was promoted to a full-time assistant for the Rattlers.

On May 17, 2010, Florida A&M fired head coach Robert Lucas and placed Richardson in charge of the day-to-day operations. On September 16, 2010, Richardson was named the interim head coach of the Florida A&M Rattlers. He led the Rattlers to a 17–40 record and a return to the MEAC Tournament.

On August 19, 2015, Richardson was named the head baseball coach at Alcorn State University.

== Head coaching record ==
Record table
Season	Team	Overall	Conference	Standing	Postseason
Florida A&M Rattlers (Mid-Eastern Athletic Conference) (2011)
2011	Florida A&M	17–40	6–12	6th	MEAC Tournament
Florida A&M:		17–40	6–12		
Alcorn State Braves (Southwestern Athletic Conference) (2016–2021)
2016	Alcorn State	16–36	10–13	3rd (East)	SWAC Tournament
2017	Alcorn State	12–33	7–17	4th (East)	SWAC Tournament
2018	Alcorn State	13–39	7–17	5th (East)	
2019	Alcorn State	14–31	7–16	4th (East)	SWAC Tournament
2020	Alcorn State	5–7	3–3	(East)	Season canceled due to COVID-19
2021	Alcorn State	7–20	6–16	4th (East)	SWAC Tournament
Alcorn State:		66–166	40–82		
Total:		84–206			
National champion Postseason invitational champion Conference regular season champion Conference regular season and conference tournament champion Division regular season champion Division regular season and conference tournament champion Conference tournament champion
