= Reggie Williams (1980s outfielder) =

American baseball player (born 1960)

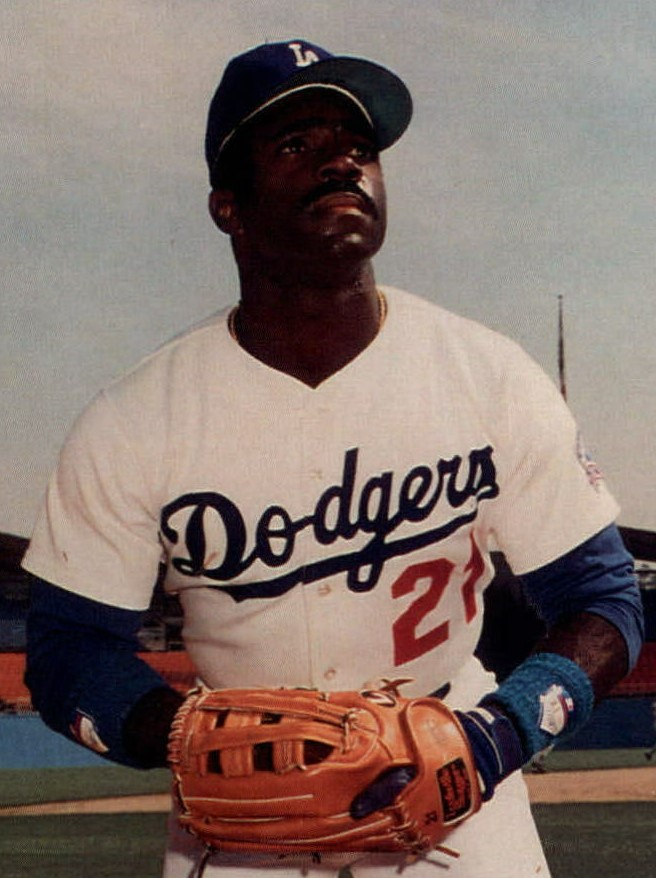
- Williams with the Los Angeles Dodgers
- Outfielder / Coach
- Born: August 29, 1960 (age 65); Memphis, Tennessee, U.S.
- Batted: Right Threw: Right

MLB debut
- September 2, 1985, for the Los Angeles Dodgers

Last MLB appearance
- October 2, 1988, for the Cleveland Indians

MLB statistics
- Batting average: .259
- Home runs: 5
- Runs batted in: 39
- Stats at Baseball Reference

Teams
- Los Angeles Dodgers (1985–1987); Cleveland Indians (1988)

Reginald Dewayne Williams (born August 29, 1960) is an American baseball coach and former outfielder, who most recently was the head baseball coach of the Alcorn State Braves. He played college baseball at Southern from 1979 to 1982 and played in Major League Baseball (MLB) for 4 seasons from 1985 to 1988.

Williams was born in Memphis, Tennessee. After graduation from high school, he enrolled at Southern University and played outfield for the Jaguars. He was drafted in the 6th round of the 1981 Major League Baseball draft by the St. Louis Cardinals, but returned to school for a senior season.

The Los Angeles Dodgers selected Williams in the 13th round of the 1982 Major League Baseball draft. He played 4 years in MLB, with Los Angeles from 1985 to 1987, and the Cleveland Indians in 1988.

On August 20, 2021, Williams was named the head baseball coach at Alcorn State.

In 2025, Williams was named as a coach for the Chattanooga Lookouts the Double-A affiliate of the Cincinnati Reds.

== Head coaching record ==
Record table
Season	Team	Overall	Conference	Standing	Postseason
Alcorn State Braves (Southwestern Athletic Conference) (2022–2024)
2022	Alcorn State	2–39	2–28	6th (West)	
2023	Alcorn State	9–39	6–23	6th (West)	
2024	Alcorn State	6–42	5–24	6th (West)	
Alcorn State:		17–120	13–75		
Total:		17–120			
National champion Postseason invitational champion Conference regular season champion Conference regular season and conference tournament champion Division regular season champion Division regular season and conference tournament champion Conference tournament champion
