= Aaron Stevens (baseball) =

American baseball player and coach

Playing career
- 1985–1988: Nicholls State
- Position: Third baseman

Coaching career (HC unless noted)
- 2001–2014: Mississippi Valley State (asst)
- 2015–2021: Mississippi Valley State

Head coaching record
- Overall: 39–203–1
- Tournaments: SWAC 0–2; NCAA: 0–0

Aaron Stevens is an American college baseball coach and former third baseman. He played college baseball at Nicholls State for coach Mike Knight from 1985 to 1988. He then served as the head coach of the Mississippi Valley State Devils (2015–2021)

== Early life ==
Stevens attended Lanier High School in Jackson, Mississippi. Stevens then accepted a scholarship to attend Nicholls State University.

== Coaching career ==
After 14 seasons as an assistant at Mississippi Valley State University, Stevens was promoted to head coach on December 2, 2014. On the heels of back-to-back win-less seasons in 2020 and 2021, Stevens was not retained for the 2022 season.

== Head coaching record ==
Record table
Season	Team	Overall	Conference	Standing	Postseason
Mississippi Valley State Delta Devils (Southwestern Athletic Conference) (2015–2021)
2015	Mississippi Valley State	7–36–1	4–20	5th (East)	
2016	Mississippi Valley State	6–36	4–20	5th (East)	
2017	Mississippi Valley State	7–34	6–18	5th (East)	
2018	Mississippi Valley State	11–35	9–15	4th (East)	SWAC Tournament
2019	Mississippi Valley State	8–27	6–17	5th (East)	
2020	Mississippi Valley State	0–15	0–6	(East)	Season canceled due to COVID-19
2021	Mississippi Valley State	0–20	0–17	5th (East)	
Mississippi Valley State:		39–203–1	29–113		
Total:		39–203–1			
National champion Postseason invitational champion Conference regular season champion Conference regular season and conference tournament champion Division regular season champion Division regular season and conference tournament champion Conference tournament champion
