= Zach Penprase =

American-Israeli baseball player (born 1985)

- Shortstop
- Born: February 16, 1985 (age 41); Moorpark, California, U.S.
- Bats: Right Throws: Right
- Stats at Baseball Reference

Zachary William Penprase OLY (Hebrew: זאק פנפרייז; born February 16, 1985) is an American-Israeli former professional baseball infielder. He played for Israel's national team in several international tournaments and played in American minor and independent leagues for 11 seasons, primarily with the Fargo-Moorhead RedHawks.

== Amateur career ==
Penprase attended Moorpark High School in Moorpark, California.

He then played college baseball for the Mississippi Valley State Delta Devils. In both 2005 and 2006 Penprase was Southwestern Athletic Conference All-Conference infielder. In 2006, he led the country in stolen bases, with 60, as he played shortstop. He was named a Jewish Sports Review All Star. He holds school records with 9 triples in a season (2005), 56 stolen bases in a season (2006), and 103 career stolen bases.

In 2010, he finished his degree at Mississippi Valley State.

== Professional career ==
=== Philadelphia Phillies ===
The Philadelphia Phillies selected Penprase in the 13th round of the 2006 Major League Baseball draft. That summer, he played second base and shortstop for the Batavia Muckdogs of the Class A Short Season New York-Pennsylvania League (NYPL), where he was a mid-season All Star, batting .211/.282/.247 with 19 stolen bases. In 2007, he played for the Williamsport Crosscutters of the NYPL and for the Lakewood BlueClaws of the Class A South Atlantic League.

The Phillies released Penprase on April 4, 2008. He signed by the Fargo-Moorhead Redhawks.

=== Boston Red Sox ===
Penprase signed with the Boston Red Sox on August 1, 2008. He played primarily second base for the Class A Greenville Drive, batting .235/.306/.296. The Red Sox released him on November 3, 2008.

=== Fargo-Moorhead RedHawks (second stint) ===
From 2008 until 2015, Penprase played shortstop for the independent league Fargo-Moorhead Redhawks, with his best seasons including 2008 (.326 batting average), 2009 (leading the Northern League in both runs and stolen bases (45, in 53 attempts), and 2012 (.424 on-base percentage and 47 stolen bases (leading the American Association) in 52 attempts).

As of 2025, he holds the RedHawks single-season record in runs (100, a Northern League record, in 2009), and career records in games played, runs, hits, walks, doubles, and stolen bases. In 2009, he was a Northern League All-Star, and in 2012, he was an American Association All-Star.

In 2012, he played one season for the Sydney Blue Sox of the Australian Baseball League, batting .282/.363/.387 with 16 stolen bases.

=== New York Boulders ===
On April 9, 2021, Penprase signed with the New York Boulders of the Frontier League. In 34 games for the Boulders, Penprase slashed .254/.343/.322 with 1 home run and 15 RBIs. He was released by New York on July 9, prior to the start of that summer's Olympics.

== International career ==
Penprase competed on the Israel national team for qualification for the 2020 Olympics. He started all six games at shortstop as the team played in the 2019 European Baseball Championship - B-Pool in early July 2019 in Blagoevgrad, Bulgaria, winning all of its games and advancing to the playoffs against Lithuania in the 2019 Playoff Series at the end of July 2019 for the last qualifying spot for the 2019 European Baseball Championship. He batted .381 (8th in the tournament)/.481/.810 (5th) in the B-Pool tournament with 3 doubles (3rd) and 12 RBIs (2nd) in 21 at bats. Penprase said: "Getting Israeli citizenship was such a special moment and playing for my country, something that is so much bigger than me, was truly amazing."

Penprase played for Israel at the 2019 European Baseball Championship. He also played for the team at the Africa/Europe 2020 Olympic Qualification tournament in Italy in September 2019, which Israel won to qualify to play baseball at the 2020 Summer Olympics in Tokyo. In the tournament he played third base in every game and batted .313/.400/.313 with 6 runs (tied for 2nd) in 16 at bats.

He played for Israel at the 2020 Summer Olympics in Tokyo in the summer of 2021. He batted 3-for-12 with a stolen base, and appeared in left field, as a pinch runner, as a pinch hitter, and as a designated hitter.

== Personal life ==
Penprase and his wife Sheena have a daughter.

His mother Elaine is Jewish, and his father Rich is Christian. In 2019, he became an Israeli citizen, thereby becoming a dual Israeli-American.
