= Stanley Stubbs (baseball) =

College baseball coach

Current position
- Title: Sports agent

Biographical details
- Born: Booneville, Mississippi, U.S.
- Education: Lane College (Bachelor's of Science) & Jackson State University (Master's in Education)

Playing career
- 1991–1992: Northeast Mississippi
- 1993–1994: Lane
- Position: Catcher / Outfielder

Coaching career (HC unless noted)
- 1995–1998: Jackson State (Asst)
- 1999–2000: Paine
- 2001–2002: Albany State
- 2003: Benedict
- 2011–2013: LeMoyne–Owen
- 2014–2015: Savannah State (Asst)
- 2016–2017: Texas College
- 2017: Savannah Bananas (Asst)
- 2018–2021: Rust
- 2022: Mississippi Valley State
- 2026-: Oakwood

Accomplishments and honors

Championships
- 3× SIAC (2000, 2001, 2002)

Stanley Eric Stubbs is a baseball coach and former catcher and outfielder. He played college baseball at Northeast Mississippi Community College before transferring to Lane where he played from 1993 to 1994. He currently serves as the head baseball coach at Oakwood University.

== Playing career ==
Stubbs attended High School, in Booneville, Mississippi and played college baseball at Northeast Mississippi Community College. He then transferred to Lane College where he caught and played outfield for the Dragons.

== Coaching career ==
In 1995, Stubbs began his coaching career as an assistant at Jackson State.

In the summer of 2015, Stubbs was named the head baseball coach of the Texas College Steers. Following two seasons at Texas College, Stubbs was named the head coach of the Rust College

On July 27, 2021, Stubbs was named the head coach of the Mississippi Valley State Delta Devils. The Delta Devils went 10–31–1 in 2022, the 10 wins during the season, were more than the team had won the previous 3 seasons combined. Stubbs resigned on June 15, 2022, due to health concerns.

On December 1, 2025, Stubbs was named the head coach of the Oakwood University Ambassadors.

== Head coaching record ==
Record table
| Season | Team | Overall | Conference | Standing | Postseason |
|---|---|---|---|---|---|
Paine Lions (Southern Intercollegiate Athletic Conference) (1999–2000)
| 1999 | Paine | 0–0 | 0–0 | | |
| 2000 | Paine | 0–0 | 0–0 | 1st | |
| Paine: | | 0–0 | 0–0 | | |
Albany State Golden Rams (Southern Intercollegiate Athletic Conference) (2001–2002)
| 2001 | Albany State | 24–15 | 10–0 | 1st | |
| 2002 | Albany State | 17–30 | 0–0 | 1st | |
| Albany State: | | 41–45 | 0–0 | | |
Benedict Tigers (Southern Intercollegiate Athletic Conference) (2003)
| 2003 | Benedict | 0–0 | 0–0 | | |
| Benedict: | | 0–0 | 0–0 | | |
LeMoyne–Owen Magicians (Southern Intercollegiate Athletic Conference) (2011–2013)
| 2011 | LeMoyne–Owen | 3–23 | 0–15 | 5th (West) | |
| 2012 | LeMoyne–Owen | 10–25 | 6–14 | 4th (West) | |
| 2013 | LeMoyne–Owen | 14–21–1 | 9–13–1 | 4th (West) | |
| LeMoyne–Owen: | | 27–69–1 | 15–53–1 | | |
Texas College Steers (Red River Athletic Conference) (2016–2017)
| 2016 | Texas College | 5–38 | 3–29 | 9th | |
| 2017 | Texas College | 14–41 | 6–21 | 9th | |
| Texas College (NAIA): | | 19–79 | 9–50 | | |
Rust Bearcats (Independent) (2018)
| 2018 | Rust | 0–15 | 0–0 | | |
Rust Bearcats (Gulf Coast Athletic Conference) (2019–2021)
| 2019 | Rust | 3–27 | 0–6 | 4th | |
| 2020 | Rust | 1–0 | 0–0 | | Season canceled due to COVID-19 |
| 2021 | Rust | 13–20 | 4–2 | 2nd | |
| Rust (NAIA): | | 17–62 | 4–8 | | |
Mississippi Valley State Delta Devils (Southwestern Athletic Conference) (2022)
| 2022 | Mississippi Valley State | 10–31–1 | 4–24 | 6th (East) | |
| Mississippi Valley State: | | 10–31–1 | 4–24 | | |
| Total: | | 78–145–2 | | | |
National champion Postseason invitational champion Conference regular season champion Conference regular season and conference tournament champion Division regular season champion Division regular season and conference tournament champion Conference tournament champion
