= Alcorn State Braves and Lady Braves =

- University: Alcorn State University
- Nickname: Braves
- NCAA: Division I (FCS)
- Conference: Southwestern Athletic Conference
- Athletic director: Derek Horne
- Location: Lorman, Mississippi
- Varsity teams: 17
- Football stadium: Casem-Spinks Stadium
- Basketball arena: Davey Whitney Complex
- Baseball stadium: Foster Baseball Field at McGowan Stadium
- Softball stadium: Turner Lake Softball Complex
- Volleyball arena: Davey Whitney Complex
- Colors: Purple and gold
- Website: alcornsports.com
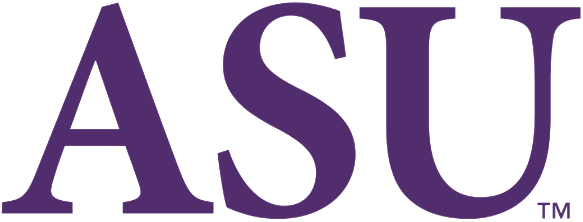

The Alcorn State Braves and Lady Braves represent Alcorn State University in Lorman, Mississippi in intercollegiate athletics. They field 15 teams including men's and women's basketball, cross country, golf, tennis, and track and field; women's-only soccer, softball, and volleyball; and men's-only baseball and football. The Braves compete in NCAA Division I and are members of the Southwestern Athletic Conference.

== Sponsored sports ==
Men's sports	Women's sports
Baseball	Basketball
Basketball	Cross Country
Cross Country	Golf
Football	Soccer
Golf	Softball
Tennis	Tennis
Track & Field	Track & Field
	Volleyball
