= Wheeler–Watkins Baseball Complex =

Baseball venue in Montgomery, Alabama

- Interactive map of Wheeler–Watkins Baseball Complex
- Full name: Herbert Wheeler–Larry Watkins Baseball Complex
- Location: 915 South Jackson Street, Montgomery, Alabama, United States
- Coordinates: 32°21′39″N 86°17′17″W
- Owner: Alabama State University
- Operator: Alabama State University
- Capacity: 500
- Surface: Bermuda grass
- Field size: 330 ft. (LF); 375 ft. (LCF); 400 ft. (CF); 375 ft. (RCF); 330 ft. (RF); 8 ft. (outfield fence)

Construction
- Built: 2011
- Opened: Spring 2011
- Cost: $3.9 million

Tenant
- Alabama State Hornets baseball (NCAA DI SWAC) (2011–present)

Wheeler–Watkins Baseball Complex is a baseball venue in Montgomery, Alabama, United States. It is home to the Alabama State Hornets baseball team of the NCAA Division I Southwestern Athletic Conference. The venue is named for two former Alabama State baseball coaches, Herbert Wheeler and Larry Watkins. Opened in March 2011, the facility has a capacity of 500 spectators.

== Naming ==
On February 17, 2012, the facility was dedicated to Herbert Wheeler and Larry Watkins, two former Hornet baseball coaches. Wheeler coached the program from the 1960s to 1981. Watkins, who played under and coached with Wheeler, coached the program from 1982 to 2011. Watkins had over 500 career wins by the time of his retirement, the most of any Alabama State baseball coach.

== See also ==
- List of NCAA Division I baseball venues
