= Magnolia Field =

Baseball park in Itta Bena, Mississippi

- Interactive map of Magnolia Field
- Location: Fannie Lou Hamer St. Itta Bena, MS 38941
- Coordinates: 33.509947°N 90.344809°W
- Operator: Mississippi Valley State University
- Capacity: 120
- Surface: Grass
- Field size: Left Field: 313 feet (95 m); Center Field: 394 feet (120 m); Right Field: 315 feet (96 m)

Construction
- Opened: 1950

Tenant
- Mississippi Valley State Delta Devils baseball (NCAA DI SWAC) (1950–present)

Magnolia Field is a 120-seat baseball park in Itta Bena, Mississippi. It is the home field for the Mississippi Valley State Delta Devils in the NCAA Division I Southwestern Athletic Conference.

The Delta Devils opened their 2010 season hosting Notre Dame, playing the first of three games at Magnolia Field.

== See also ==
- Rice–Totten Stadium, adjacent, formerly known as Magnolia Field
