= Foster Baseball Field at McGowan Stadium =

- Interactive map of Foster Baseball Field at McGowan Stadium
- Full name: William "Bill" Foster Baseball Field at Willie E. "Rat" McGowan Stadium
- Former names: Alcorn State University Baseball Park
- Location: Alcorn Avenue, Lorman, Mississippi, USA
- Coordinates: 31.875435°N 91.137568°W
- Owner: Alcorn State University
- Operator: Alcorn State University
- Surface: Natural grass

Tenant
- Alcorn State Braves baseball (SWAC)

William "Bill" Foster Baseball Field at Willie E. "Rat" McGowan Stadium is a baseball venue in Lorman, Mississippi, United States. It is home to the Alcorn State Braves baseball team of the NCAA Division I Southwestern Athletic Conference. The field is named for Bill Foster, former Negro leagues baseball player, member of the National Baseball Hall of Fame, and Alcorn State head baseball coach from 1960 to 1971. The stadium is named for Willie McGowan, head baseball coach from 1972 to 2009. In 38 years as Alcorn State's coach, McGowan won over 700 games. The field and stadium were officially dedicated on September 4, 2010. Plaques commemorating the dedications were added on May 6, 2011.

The venue is located next to Henderson Stadium, the Alcorn State football program's home field from 1925 to 1992.

== See also ==
- List of NCAA Division I baseball venues
