= Mississippi Valley State Delta Devils baseball =

Mississippi Valley State Delta Devils
- 2026 Mississippi Valley State Delta Devils baseball team
- University: Mississippi Valley State University
- Head coach: C. J. Bilbrey (3rd season)
- Conference: SWAC; East Division
- Location: Itta Bena, Mississippi
- Home stadium: Magnolia Field (Capacity: 200)
- Nickname: Delta Devils
- Colors: Forest green and white

Conference regular season champions
- 2005, 2006

The Mississippi Valley State Delta Devils baseball team is a varsity intercollegiate athletic team of Mississippi Valley State University in Itta Bena, Mississippi, United States. The team is a member of the Southwestern Athletic Conference, which is part of the National Collegiate Athletic Association's Division I. The team plays its home games at Magnolia Field in Itta Bena, Mississippi. C. J. Bilbrey is the team's head coach starting in the 2024 season.

== History ==
Fourteen-year head coach Doug Shanks retired on November 12, 2014. After serving as an assistant to Shanks for all 14 seasons, Aaron Stevens was promoted to head coach on December 2, 2014. On the heels of back-to-back win-less seasons in 2020 and 2021, Stevens was not retained for the 2022 season. On July 27, 2021, Stanley Stubbs was named the head coach of the Delta Devils. With the Delta Devils improving by 10 wins over the previous season, Stubbs had done a good job helping turn around the Delta Devils fortunes, but he resigned due to health concerns on June 15, 2022. On August 11, 2022, Milton Barney Jr. was named the head coach of the Delta Devils. The school hired C. J. Brilbrey on July 21, 2023.

== Head coaches ==
Season	Coach	Years	Record	Pct.
1957–1960	Jay Hawkins	4	9–9	.500
1975–1977	Clinton Vasser	3	33–34–1	.493
1978–2000	Cleotha Wilson	23	276–575–5	.325
2001–2014	Doug Shanks	14	253–471	.349
2015–2021	Aaron Stevens	7	39–183–1	.177
2022	Stanley Stubbs	1	10–31–1	.250
2023	Milton Barney Jr.	1	15–37	.288
2024–present	C. J. Bilbrey	1	12–34	.261
Totals	8 coaches	54 seasons	647–1,374–8	.321

== Major League Baseball ==
Mississippi Valley State has had 15 Major League Baseball draft selections since the draft began in 1965.

Delta Devils in the Major League Baseball Draft
Year	Name	Round	Team
1966	Louis Inman	28	Red Sox
1981	Bo Jordan	18	Athletics
1981	Willie Weston	14	Red Sox
1983	Tyrone Barnes	31	Tigers
1984	Herman Boddy	28	Expos
1985	Tim Watkins	8	Reds
1986	Robbie Gilbert	12	Athletics
1988	Steven James	52	White Sox
1988	Wayne Busby	19	White Sox
1998	Fontella Jones	24	Brewers
1998	Rickey Lewis	18	Brewers
2003	Tee Thomas	24	Cardinals
2006	Zach Penprase	13	Phillies
2009	Jeff Squier	14	Rockies
2015	Kalik May	33	Blue Jays

== Notable players ==
- Zach Penprase, Israeli-American baseball player for the Israel national team

== See also ==
- List of NCAA Division I baseball programs
