= Mississippi Valley State University =

Public university in Mississippi Valley State, Mississippi, US

Coordinates: 33.51256°N 90.342422°W

- Former names: Mississippi Vocational College (1950–1964); Mississippi Valley State College (1964–1974)
- Motto: "Live for Service"
- Type: Public historically black university
- Established: February 19, 1950; 76 years ago (groundbreaking)
- Parent institution: Mississippi Institutions of Higher Learning
- Accreditation: SACS
- Academic affiliations: TMCF; Space-grant
- Endowment: $3.65 million (2021)
- President: Jerryl Briggs
- Students: 2,196 (fall 2023)
- Location: Itta Bena postal address, Mississippi, United States
- Campus: 450 acres (1.8 km^{2}); Remote town
- Other campuses: Greenville
- Newspaper: Delta Devils Gazette
- Colors: Forest green, white, and red
- Nickname: Delta Devils & Devilettes
- Sporting affiliations: NCAA Division I FCS - SWAC
- Mascot: Delta Devil
- Website: www.mvsu.edu

Mississippi Valley State University (MVSU, The Valley or Valley) is a public historically black university in Mississippi Valley State, Mississippi, adjacent to Itta Bena, Mississippi. MVSU is a member-school of the Thurgood Marshall College Fund.

== History ==
The institution, which opened in 1950, was created by the Mississippi Legislature as Mississippi Vocational College. The legislation to form the institution was signed into law by Governor Thomas L. Bailey on April 5, 1946. On February 10, 1950, Governor Fielding L. Wright served as the main speaker at the opening ceremony.

The legislature anticipated that legal segregation of public education was in danger because there were increasing challenges to it through legal suits (in 1954 it was declared unconstitutional in the United States Supreme Court's decision in Brown v. Board of Education). It created this institution in the hopes that it would attract African-American applicants who might otherwise apply to Mississippi's premier whites-only institutions: the University of Mississippi, Mississippi State University, and the University of Southern Mississippi.

State leaders hoped that founding separate institutions of higher learning for Mississippi's black population would reduce the pressure to integrate the state's premier universities. To attract the support of those who opposed any government action to provide higher education to black people, those proposing creation of M.V.C. used the term "vocational" to imply that the institution's main purpose would be to train black people to take on blue-collar jobs.

The site selection committee appointed by the Board of Trustees of State Institutions of Higher Learning had originally selected as a site the former Greenwood Army Air Base, which had many facilities ready for use and thus would have been a very cost-effective choice. The Greenwood Commonwealth celebrated the choice. However, residents of Carroll County, Mississippi objected to having the institution located near their properties.

After further study, the committee selected a site in Itta Bena. Whites of that town also objected to having a black institution nearby, so the final site chosen was away from the downtown area, and on land that was not good for cultivation.

In 1964, Mississippi Vocational College was renamed Mississippi Valley State College.

In February 1970, a nonviolent student boycott, which included eight hundred students, male and female, was organized to protest President James Herbert White's administration. The students demanded required courses in black history, more library purchases of works by black writers, remedial courses in English and Math, scheduling of prominent black speakers, and fewer curfew restrictions. This protest culminated in the arrest 894 students, the largest mass arrest of students in U.S. History

In the early 1970s, civil rights leaders continued to protest the inequalities in higher education opportunities offered to whites and blacks in Mississippi. In an effort to defuse some of the criticism, Gov. Bill Waller proposed changing the names of three black institutions from "colleges" to "universities". Thus, in 1974, the institution was renamed again, as Mississippi Valley State University.

Following President White, Dr. Ernest A. Boykins, Jr. took office in July 1971. Dr. Joe L. Boyer became MVSU's third president in January 1982 and was followed by Dr. William W. Sutton in July 1988. Dr. Lester C. Newman became the fifth president of MVSU on July 1, 1998. Dr. Donna H. Oliver became MVSU's sixth president and first female president on January 1, 2009. On November 6, 2013, Dr. William Bynum took office as MVSU's seventh president.

In May 2017, Bynum departed MVSU to become president of Jackson State University. Dr. Jerryl Briggs, who served as executive vice president and chief operating officer in Bynum's administration, was named interim president of the university shortly afterwards. On October 19, 2017, Briggs was officially named as the university's eighth president.

In a 1997 article in Innovative Higher Education, the journalist Dale Thorn describes MVSU's successful attempt to avoid a merger with another institution and to remain a separate entity.

In 1998, the university renamed many of the buildings on campus, except for those named for white supremacist politicians Walter Sillers, Jr., Fielding Wright, and J. H. White.

== Campus ==
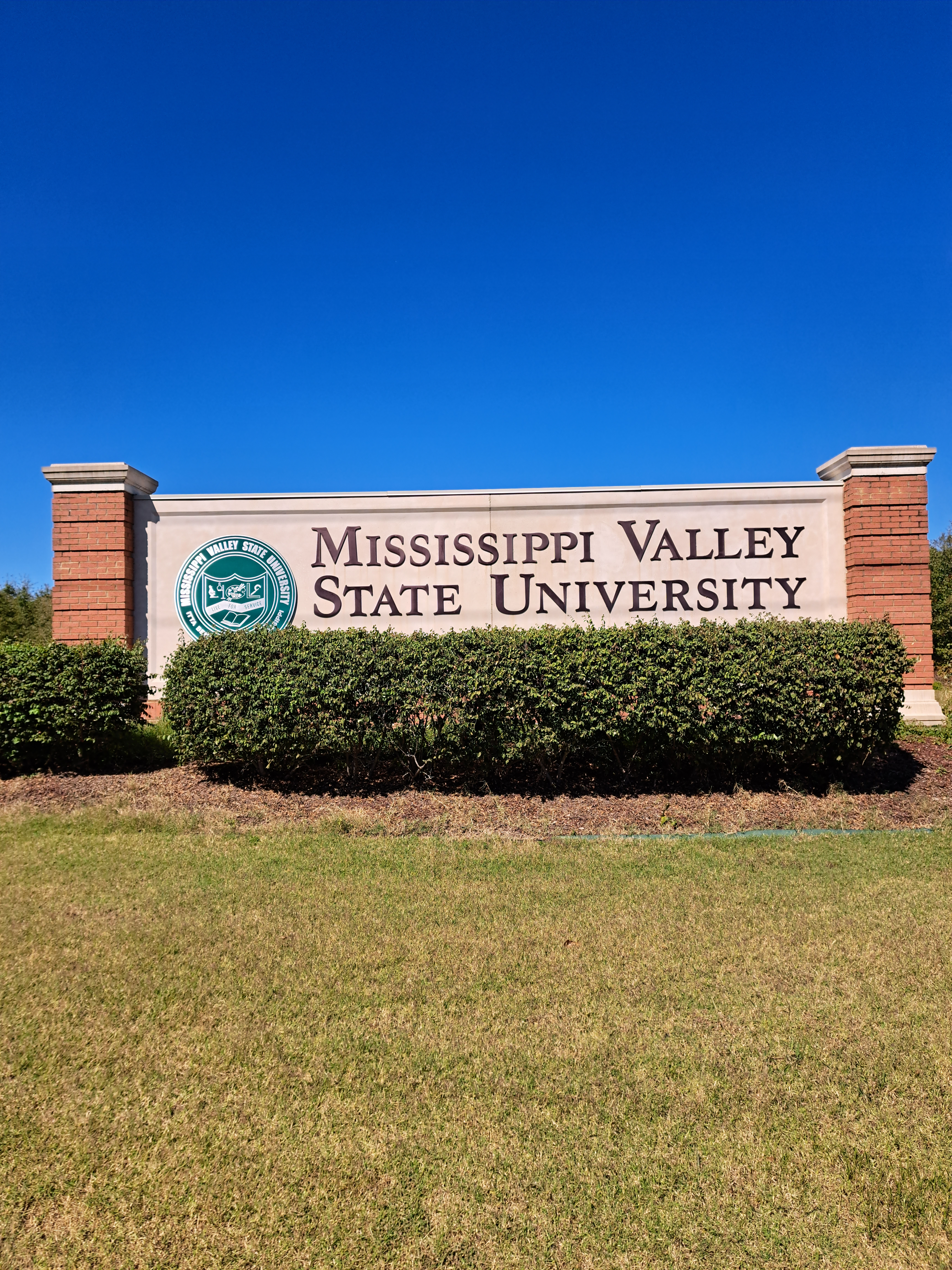

The campus is on a 450-acre (180 ha) tract of land adjacent to U.S. Highway 82.

It is in Mississippi Valley State census-designated place, in unincorporated Leflore County, in the Mississippi Delta region. It is 1 mile (1.6 km) northwest of Itta Bena. The university is about 5 miles (8.0 km) from Greenwood, about 50 miles (80 km) from Greenville, about 100-mile (160 km) north of Jackson, and about 120-mile (190 km) south of Memphis, Tennessee.

MVSU includes faculty and staff apartments and other residential apartments. Dependent children living in these units are within the Greenwood-Leflore School District. These apartments were formerly served by the Leflore County School District. Effective July 1, 2019 this district consolidated into the Greenwood-Leflore School District.

== Academics ==
Mississippi Valley State University offers undergraduate and graduate degrees through the following entities:

- College of Art & Sciences
- College of Professional Studies
- College of Education
- Graduate School

MVSU offers an honors program for high-achieving undergraduate students on campus.

MVSU was accredited in 1968 by the Southern Association of Colleges and Schools Commission on Colleges to award bachelor's and master's degrees.

== Student life ==
Undergraduate demographics as of Fall 2023
Race and ethnicity	Total
Black	89%
Unknown	5%
Hispanic	2%
White	2%
Two or more races	1%
Economic diversity
Low-income (Note: The percentage of students who received an income-based federal Pell grant intended for low-income students.)	75%
Affluent (Note: The percentage of students who are a part of the American middle class at the bare minimum.)	25%

Extracurricular programs include theater, special interest groups, orchestra, fraternities, sororities, and band. Students may work on the Delvian (yearbook) or the Delta Devil Gazette (student-run newspaper). Leadership opportunities are found in the Student Government Association (SGA) or other organizations such as English Club, Future Teachers of America, and Trades and Industries Club.

=== Mean Green Marching Machine ===
Mississippi Valley State University's marching band is known as the "Mean Green Marching Machine" (also goes by the moniker of "The Mack Of The SWAC") and the "Satin Dolls" are the featured dance squad. The band holds the distinction of being the first African-American band to participate in the Tournament of Roses parade, which it achieved in 1965.

The Mean Green Marching Machine was invited to perform during Donald Trump's second inauguration and participated in the parade January 20, 2025, at Capital One Arena. The parade was moved indoors due to inclement weather.

== Athletics ==
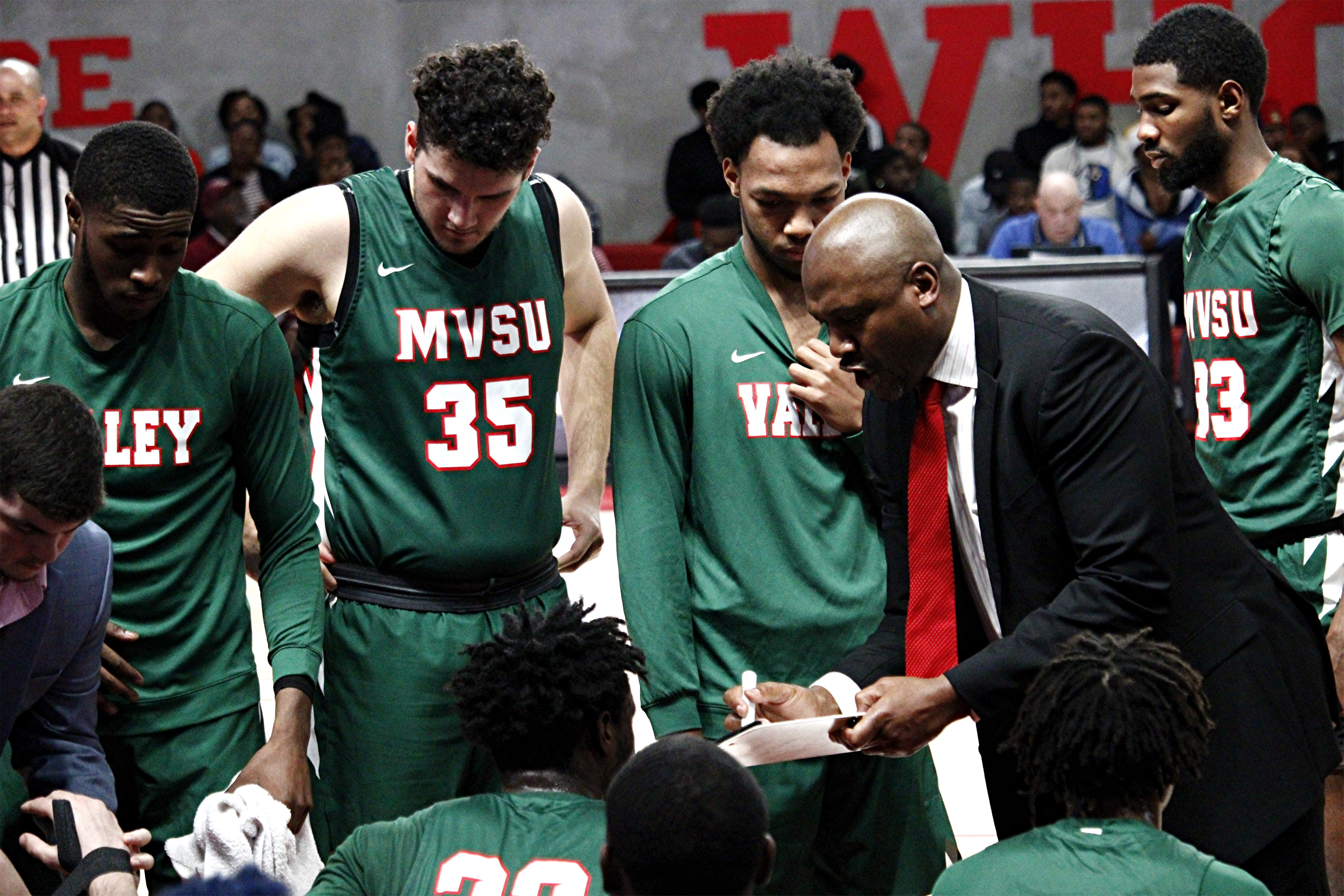
Coach Lindsey Hunter and the Mississippi Valley State Delta Devils basketball team in 2020

MVSU's colors are forest green, red and white. Their nickname is the Delta Devils for men's teams and Devilettes for women's teams. MVSU sports teams participate in NCAA Division I (I-AA for football) in the Southwestern Athletic Conference (SWAC). Famous alumni include NFL wide receiver Jerry Rice of the 1984 football team.

In 2016, MVSU completed $17.5 million worth of renovations to the Harrison HPER Complex. The 87,042 square foot multi-purpose arena is home to MVSU men's basketball, women's basketball, volleyball, commencement ceremonies, and other special events. The facility includes features such as fitness centers, an indoor walking track, and three technology HPER classrooms.

Willie "Satellite" Totten, who was an assistant football coach at MVSU, was the college quarterback at the school when Jerry Rice played. The football stadium is named for them. Totten now coaches at Southern University in Louisiana.

== WVSD 91.7 FM ==
MVSU's on-campus public radio station is WVSD 91.7 FM. The station offers a variety of programming involving MVSU, current events, and music.

== Notable alumni ==
Name	Class year	Notability	Reference(s)
Katie Hall	1960	Former U.S. Representative from Indiana from 1982 to 1985, and former city clerk of Gary, Indiana	
David Lee Jordan	N/A	Democratic Mississippi State Senator since 1993	
Bryant Clark	1998	Democratic Mississippi state representative since 2004, and a Mississippi Attorney	
Chris Epps	1982?	Longest-serving commissioner of the Mississippi Department of Corrections	
Wally Amos (Famous Amos)		social media personality	
Jerry Rice	1985	Former NFL wide receiver; member of the Pro Football Hall of Fame	
Willie Totten	1985	Former Head coach of the Delta Devils football team	
Patricia Hoskins	1991	former player for the women's basketball team, the Devilletes, who once held the record for NCAA Division I women's basketball points scored in a career	
Carl Byrum	N/A	NFL running back	
Ashley Ambrose	1992	NFL cornerback	
Fred Bohannon	1982	Former NFL defensive back	
Vincent Brown	1987	Former NFL linebacker and current college football coach	
Cadillac Don & J-Money		Rappers	
Parnell Dickinson	1975	Former NFL quarterback	
Ricky Feacher	1975	Former NFL wide receiver and member	
Alphonso Ford	1992	Former NBA and Euroleague basketball player	
James Haynes	1984	Former NFL linebacker (1984-1989) for the New Orleans Saints	
Corey Holmes	2000	Mayor of Metcalfe, Mississippi; former CFL running back	
Jason Holmes		first born-and-raised American to debut in the Australian Football League with St Kilda Football Club	
George Ivory	1988	Current men's head basketball coach	
Dewayne Jefferson	2001	Former professional basketball player	
Deacon Jones	1960	Former NFL defensive end; member of the Pro Football Hall of Fame	
Ronald Kirklin	1987	Major General in the United States Army. Former Quartermaster General and Commandant of the Quartermaster School at Fort Lee	
Dave McDaniels	1967	Former NFL wide receiver	
Melvin Morgan	1976	Former NFL defensive back	
James Oliver	1968	First African-American graduate of UMMC	
Zach Penprase		Israeli-American baseball player for the Israel National Baseball Team	
Tyrone Timmons	2006	Arena football wide receiver	
Sam Washington	1981	Former NFL cornerback	
Ted Washington, Sr.	1972	Former NFL linebacker	
Danta Whitaker	1989	Former NFL tight end	
