= Alcorn State Braves baseball =

Alcorn State Braves
- 2026 Alcorn State Braves baseball team
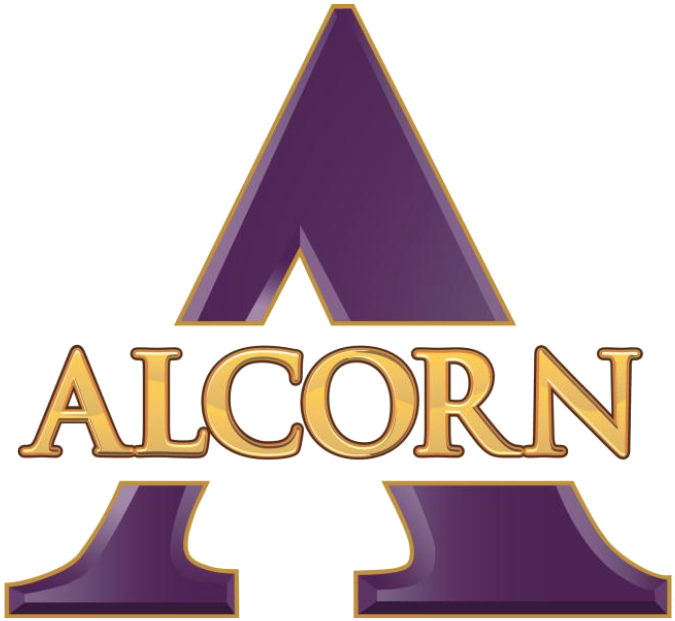
- Founded: 1959
- University: Alcorn State University
- Athletic director: Derek Horne
- Head coach: Carlton Hardy (2nd season)
- Conference: Southwestern Athletic Conference; West Division
- Location: Lorman, Mississippi
- Home stadium: Foster Baseball Field at McGowan Stadium (Capacity: 500)
- Nickname: Braves
- Colors: Purple and gold

NCAA tournament appearances
- 2011

Conference tournament champions
- 2002, 2011

Conference regular season champions
- 2002

The Alcorn State Braves baseball team is the varsity intercollegiate baseball program of Alcorn State University in Lorman, Mississippi, United States. The program's first season was in 1959, and it has been a member of the NCAA Division I Southwestern Athletic Conference since the start of the 1963 season. Its home venue is the Foster Baseball Field at McGowan Stadium, located on Alcorn State's campus. Carlton Hardy has been the team's head coach since the 2025 season. The program has appeared in 1 NCAA Tournament. It has won one conference tournament championship and 0 regular season conference titles. As of the start of the 2021 Major League Baseball season, 1 former Brave has appeared in Major League Baseball.

== History ==
=== Early history ===
The program's first season of play was 1959.

=== Conference affiliations ===
- Southwestern Athletic Conference (1963–present)

== NCAA Tournament ==
Alcorn State has participated in the NCAA Division I baseball tournament once.

Year	Region	Round	Opponent	Result
2011	Rice Regional	First Round; Lower Round 1	Rice; California	L 2–14; L 6–10

== Foster Baseball Field at McGowan Stadium ==
The stadium is named for Willie McGowan, head baseball coach from 1972 to 2009. In 38 years as Alcorn State's coach, McGowan won over 700 games. The field and stadium were officially dedicated on September 4, 2010. Plaques commemorating the dedications were added on May 6, 2011.

== Head coaches ==
Alcorn State's longest tenured head coach was Willie E. "Rat" McGowan, who has coached the team from 1972 to 2009.

Year(s)	Coach	Seasons	W-L-T	Pct
1959	Louis Crews	1	7–7	.500
1960–1969	William H. Foster	8	82–84–1	.494
1971	Davey Whitney	1	14–8–1	.630
1972–2009	Willie E. "Rat" McGowan	38	720–663–7	.521
2010–2015	Barret Rey	6	115–218	.345
2016–2021	Bretton Richardson	6	66–166	.284
2022–2024	Reggie Williams	3	17–120	.124
2025–present	Carlton Hardy	1	0–0	–
Totals	7 coaches	64	1,021–1,266–9	.447

== Notable former players ==
Below is a list of notable former Braves and the seasons in which they played for Alcorn State.

- Al Jones (1978–1981)
- Corey Wimberly (2002-2004)

== See also ==
- List of NCAA Division I baseball programs
