= George H. Hobson =

American athlete and sports coach (1908–2001)

Biographical details
- Born: May 4, 1908
- Died: November 19, 2001 (aged 93)

Playing career

Football
- c. 1932: Alabama State
- Position: Fullback

Coaching career (HC unless noted)

Football
- c. 1935: Lakeside HS (AL)
- 1937–?: Decatur Negro HS (AL)
- c. 1941: Alabama A&M (assistant)
- 1942–1959: Alabama A&M

Track and field
- c. 1935: Lakeside HS (AL)?
- 1937–?: Decatur Negro HS (AL)?

Basketball
- c. 1940s: Alabama A&M

Baseball
- c. 1950s: Alabama A&M

Tennis
- Unknown: Alabama A&M

Golf
- Unknown: Alabama A&M

Administrative career (AD unless noted)
- 1960–?: Alabama A&M

Head coaching record
- Overall: 45–81–10 (college football)

Accomplishments and honors

Awards
- NACDA Hall of Fame (1988); Alabama A&M Athletic Hall of Fame (1992)

George H. "Hoss" Hobson (May 4, 1908 – November 19, 2001) was an American athlete and sports coach. After playing college football for Alabama State, Hobson began a coaching career at several high schools, leading his teams to four state championships. In c. 1941, he began his tenure at Alabama A&M University, for which he was best known. He served as head football coach from 1942 to 1959, and was also the athletic director for many years. In the latter position, he revived the school's baseball team and added the sports of basketball, tennis, and golf, serving as the head coach of each for a time. Hobson later served as commissioner of the SIAC and was inducted into both the NACDA and Alabama A&M Halls of Fame.

== Early life and education ==
Hobson was born on May 4, 1908. He attended high school in Greensboro, Alabama, and was captain of his school's football and baseball teams. He played college football for Alabama State as a fullback, and was team captain in 1932. That year, he was named on multiple all-state teams and was given All-America honors by several selectors as an honorable mention. Hobson received degrees from Alabama State and from Northwestern University.

== Coaching career ==
After graduating from Alabama State, Hobson began a coaching career, and served his first few years at several high schools including Lakeside High School. In 1937, he was named coach and science teacher at Decatur Negro High School. He was a key figure in organizing the Alabama and Southwest Georgia Athletic Conference, serving as its president for a time. By the time he began coaching college sports, Hobson had helped his high school teams win a total of four state championships, three of which were in football and the remaining one in track and field.

Hobson was named head football coach for the Alabama A&M Bulldogs in 1942, succeeding Dyke Smith. He had previously been an assistant to the team. It was his tenure at Alabama A&M which Hobson was best known for, going on to serve over three decades with the school including stints as athletic director and head of the physical education department. He coached football from 1942 to 1959, compiling a record of 43–83–10, before being succeeded by Louis Crews. After becoming athletic director in 1960, Hobson took Alabama A&M from having just football, to having five sports, after reviving baseball, and adding tennis, golf, and basketball. He coached each of these sports during his tenure.

Hobson brought Alabama A&M into the Southern Intercollegiate Athletic Conference (SIAC), and their "well-balanced" program earned them respect from all other conference schools. He helped organize the Magic City Classic, one of the most popular annual black college games between Alabama A&M and Alabama State, and after his career as a coach and athletic director became a prominent figure in the SIAC. Hobson served as the conference's president from 1970 to 1983, and was a member of their Ethics Committee and Physical Education Committee. He was a SIAC parliamentarian, served for a time as the president of the Southern Coaches and Officials Association, and was a member of the NCAA Committee on Committees.

== Later life and death ==
Hobson was inducted into the National Association of Collegiate Directors of Athletics Hall of Fame in 1988. He was also inducted into the Alabama A&M Athletic Hall of Fame as a charter member in 1992, which he helped create. The Hobson Fieldhouse at Alabama A&M was named in his honor and the SIAC also named their offensive back of the year award after him. He died on November 19, 2001, at the age of 93.

== Head coaching record ==
=== College football ===
Year	Team	Overall	Conference	Standing	Bowl/playoffs
Alabama A&M Bulldogs (Independent) (1942–1945)
1942	Alabama A&M	3–5			
1943	No team—World War II				
1944	No team—World War II				
1945	Alabama A&M	2–6			
Alabama A&M Bulldogs (Southern Intercollegiate Athletic Conference) (1946–1959)
1946	Alabama A&M	3–4–1	2–4–1	12th	
1947	Alabama A&M	3–5–1	1–4–1	13th	
1948	Alabama A&M	4–2–1	3–2–1	7th	
1949	Alabama A&M	6–2–2	3–2–2	5th	
1950	Alabama A&M	3–7	2–5	T–12th	
1951	Alabama A&M	3–5	3–3		
1952	Alabama A&M	1–5–2	1–4–2	13th	
1953	Alabama A&M	4–5	4–4	8th	
1954	Alabama A&M	2–7	2–6	14th	
1955	Alabama A&M	5–2–1	4–2–1	T–6th	
1956	Alabama A&M	2–5–1	2–5–1	14th	
1957	Alabama A&M	2–7	2–7	12th	
1958	Alabama A&M	1–7–1	1–7–1	11th	
1959	Alabama A&M	1–7	0–6	16th	
Alabama A&M:		45–81–10	30–61–10		
Total:		45–81–10			
