= Alabama A&M Bulldogs football =

American college football team

2026 Alabama A&M Bulldogs football team
- First season: 1912; 114 years ago
- Head coach: Sam Shade; 2nd season, 4–8 (.333)
- Location: Normal, Alabama
- Stadium: Louis Crews Stadium (capacity: 21,000)
- NCAA division: Division I FCS
- Conference: SWAC
- Division: East
- Colors: Maroon and white
- All-time record: 444–422–35 (.512)
- Bowl record: 0–2 (.000)

Black college national championships
- 2020

Conference championships
- SIAC: 1962, 1963, 1966, 1971, 1972, 1981, 1987, 1988, 1989, 1990, 1991 SWAC: 2006, 2020

Division championships
- SWAC East: 2000, 2002, 2005, 2006, 2009, 2011, 2020, 2026
- Rivalries: Alabama State Hornets (rivalry)

Uniforms
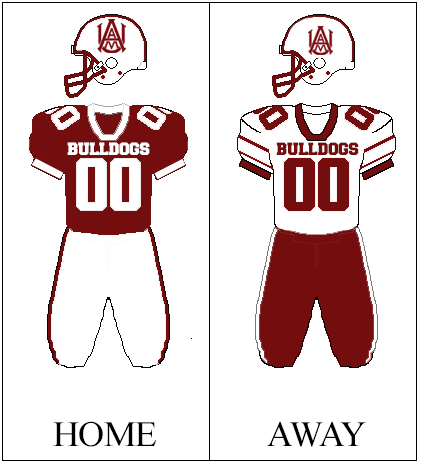
- Marching band: Marching Maroon & White
- Website: aamusports.com

The Alabama A&M Bulldogs are the college football team representing the Alabama A&M University. They play in the NCAA Division I Football Championship Subdivision (FCS) as a member of the Southwestern Athletic Conference.

== Rivalries ==
=== Alabama State ===
The Alabama State Hornets are A&M's arch-rival as the teams play annually in the Magic City Classic on the last Saturday in October at Birmingham's Historic Legion Field. A&M and State first played each other in 1924, though the annual classic began November 9, 1940 in Birmingham. The game has grown at Legion Field, a neutral site roughly halfway between the two campuses. The schools competed from 1947 to 1975 in the Southern Intercollegiate Athletic Conference. The rivalry has intensified since A&M joined State as a member of the Southwestern Athletic Conference in 1999, with the two teams regularly in contention for the Eastern Division Crown. A&M leads the overall series 44–40–3 and holds a 44–34–3 edge over State in Birmingham. A&M holds a 16–7 advantage as SWAC opponents, with one of State's wins vacated due to NCAA violations. State won the first eight contests, holding the longest streak in the series. A&M longest win streak is seven from 1960 to 1966 coinciding with the arrival of Coach Louis Crews.

=== Tuskegee ===
A&M's other in-state rivalry is with the Tuskegee Golden Tigers. The Bulldogs and Tigers began their series in 1932 and would not meet on the gridiron for another 20 years. They played annually from 1963 to 1999 including 35 years as conference rivals in the Southern Intercollegiate Athletic Conference. The series was discontinued in 2000 as A&M moved up to Division I after joining the SWAC in 1998. A&M and Tuskegee played a two-game set from 2008 to 2009, and renewed their rivalry again from 2011 to 2014. The two teams last met in Mobile for the 2021 Gulf Coast Challenge, with A&M leading the series 29–20–3.

== Championships ==
=== National championships ===
In 2020–21, A&M was voted consensus black college football national championship as the only undefeated HBCU football team in the country. The Bulldogs were voted #1 in both BOXTOROW HBCU Coaches and Media Polls as well as the historic SBN (Sheridan Broadcasting Network) Sports Poll. This is the A&M's first national championship and the third for Coach Maynor, who was voted #1 by SBN in 2011 at Winston-Salem State.

Year	Coach	National championship selectors	Record
2020	Connell Maynor	SBN Sports Poll, BOXTOROW Coaches Poll, BOXTOROW Media Poll, Black College Sports Page	5–0

=== Conference championships ===
A&M has won or shared a total of 14 league titles in football including two undefeated seasons. The Bulldogs have won two Southwestern Athletic Conference (SWAC) championships, after claiming 12 conference crowns as a member of the Southern Intercollegiate Athletic Conference (SIAC) from 1947 to 1997.

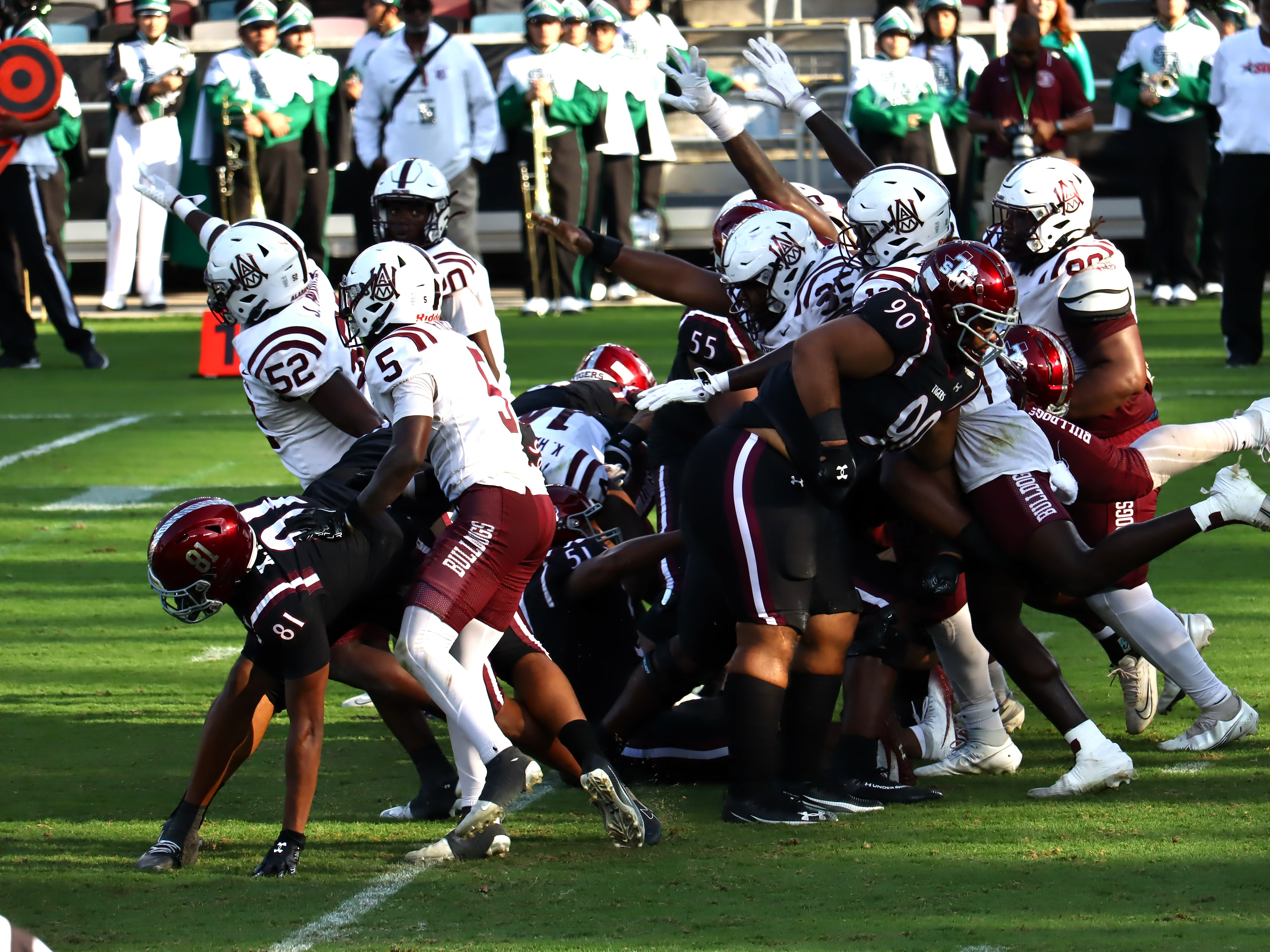
A game between Alabama A&M and Texas Southern in 2025

Season	Conference	Coach	Overall record	Conference record
1962	Southern Intercollegiate Athletic Conference	Louis Crews	8–2	6–0
1963	Southern Intercollegiate Athletic Conference	Louis Crews	8–0	7–0
1966	Southern Intercollegiate Athletic Conference	Louis Crews	8–1	6–0
1971†	Southern Intercollegiate Athletic Conference	Louis Crews	5–6	4–3
1972†	Southern Intercollegiate Athletic Conference	Louis Crews	7–1–1	6–0–1
1979	Southern Intercollegiate Athletic Conference	Ray Greene	8–3	4–0
1981	Southern Intercollegiate Athletic Conference	Ray Greene	8–2	4–1
1987†	Southern Intercollegiate Athletic Conference	Ray Greene	7–4	6–1
1988†	Southern Intercollegiate Athletic Conference	Ray Greene	7–3	6–1
1989	Southern Intercollegiate Athletic Conference	George Pugh	8–4	6–0
1990	Southern Intercollegiate Athletic Conference	George Pugh	6–5	6–1
1991†	Southern Intercollegiate Athletic Conference	Ray Bonner	5–6	5–2
2006	Southwestern Athletic Conference	Anthony Jones	9–3	6–3
2020	Southwestern Athletic Conference	Connell Maynor	5–0	3–0
Conference Championships:			14	

† Co-champions

== Postseason ==
=== Bowl games ===
Alabama A&M participated in two NCAA College Division bowl games as members of the SIAC.

Season	Coach	Bowl Game	Opponent	Result	Location
1966	Louis Crews	Orange Blossom Classic	Florida A&M	L 26–43	Miami, FL
1971	Louis Crews	Azalea Classic	Jackson State	L 21–40	Mobile, AL

=== Playoffs ===
A&M has participated in the NCAA Division II Football Championship playoffs twice, with a 1–2 record in three games. Each loss came against the eventual national runner-up.

Season	Coach	Playoff Round	Opponent	Result	Location
1979	Ray Greene	D-II First Round	Morgan State	W 27–7	Huntsville, AL
1979	Ray Greene	D-II Semifinals	Youngstown State	L 52–0	Youngstown, OH
1989	George Pugh	D-II First Round	Jacksonville State	L 33–9	Jacksonville, AL

=== SWAC Championship Game ===
The Bulldogs have represented the SWAC East in seven conference championship games, the most of any team in the division. Both wins have come against

Season	Division	Coach	Record	Result	Attendance
2000	SWAC East	Ron Cooper	7–5 (5–2)	L 14–6 Grambling State	34,687
2002	SWAC East	Anthony Jones	8–4 (6–1)	L 31–19 Grambling State	23,727
2005	SWAC East	Anthony Jones	9–3 (7–2)	L 45–6 Grambling State	20,612
2006	SWAC East	Anthony Jones	9–3 (6–3)	W 22–13 Arkansas-Pine-Bluff	30,213
2009	SWAC East	Anthony Jones	7–5 (4–3)	L 30–24 Prairie View A&M	20,218
2011	SWAC East	Anthony Jones	8–4 (7–2)	L 16–15 Grambling State	23,476
2020	SWAC East	Connell Maynor	5–0 (3–0)	W 40–33 Arkansas Pine-Bluff	17,248

== Notable players ==
=== Players of the Year ===
Award	Player	Position	Statistics
2002 SWAC Defensive Player of the Year	Robert Mathis	DE	58 TAC, 20 SAC, 32 TFL, 10 FF, 1 FUM RET TD
2019 Phil Steele's SWAC Offensive Player of the Year	Jordan Bentley	RB	272 ATT, 1417 YDS, 5.2 AVG, 18 TD, 2 REC TD
2020 Black College Football Player of the Year 2020 BOXTOROW HBCU National Player of the Year 2020 SWAC Offensive Player of the Year	Aqeel Glass	QB	57.6% CMP, 1355 YDS, 16 TD, 4 INT, 158.0 RTG
2021 Black College Football Player of the Year 2021 BOXTOROW HBCU National Player of the Year 2021 SWAC Offensive Player of the Year 2021 Phil Steele's SWAC Offensive Player of the Year	Aqeel Glass	QB	62.6% CMP, 3568 YDS, 36 TD, 7 INT, 160.8 RTG

=== Hall of Fame Inductees ===
Player	Position	Tenure	Hall of Fame	Inducted
John Stallworth	WR	1971–1974	Pro Football	2002
John Stallworth	WR	1971–1974	Black College	2014
Barry Wagner	WR/DB	1986–1989	Arena Football	2011
Robert Mathis	DE	1999–2002	Black College	2020

=== Retired numbers ===
Alabama A&M Bulldogs retired numbers
No.	Player	Pos.	Tenure	Year retired	Ref.
22	John Stallworth	WR	1971–1974	1974	
55	Robert Mathis	DE	1999–2002	2012	

=== Alumni in the NFL ===
Over 15 Alabama A&M alumni have played in the NFL, including:

- John Stallworth
- Robert Mathis
- Frank Kearse
- Ronnie Coleman
- Joe Patton
- Barry Wagner
- Mike Hegman
- Oliver Ross
- Mike Williams
- Johnny Baldwin
- Jamaal Johnson-Webb
- Anthony Lanier
- Tank Dell
- Howard Ballard
- Kendrick Rogers
- Carson Vinson

== Notable coaches ==
Coach	Seasons	Games	Record	Win %	Notes
George H. Hobson	1942–1959	136	45–81–10	.368	First A&M coach to win Magic City Classic
Louis Crews	1960–1975	149	94–52–3	.641	All-time leader in wins and games coached
Ray Greene	1979–1983, 1986–1988	85	53–27–5	.653	All-time leader in winning percentage
Ron Cooper	1998–2001	45	23–22	.511	Transitioned program to NCAA Division I
Anthony Jones	2002–2013	140	83–57	.593	All-time leader in NCAA Division I wins and SWAC wins, won A&M's first SWAC title
Connell Maynor	2018–2024	72	40–32	.556	Won A&M's first black college football national championship

== Future non-conference opponents ==
Announced schedules as of January 23, 2026

2026	2027	2028
vs Howard (Atlanta, GA); MEAC/SWAC Challenge	at Tennessee State	Tennessee State
Miles College		
Tennessee State		
Bowie State		
