= Manny Lora =

American baseball coach, professional baseball player, pitcher

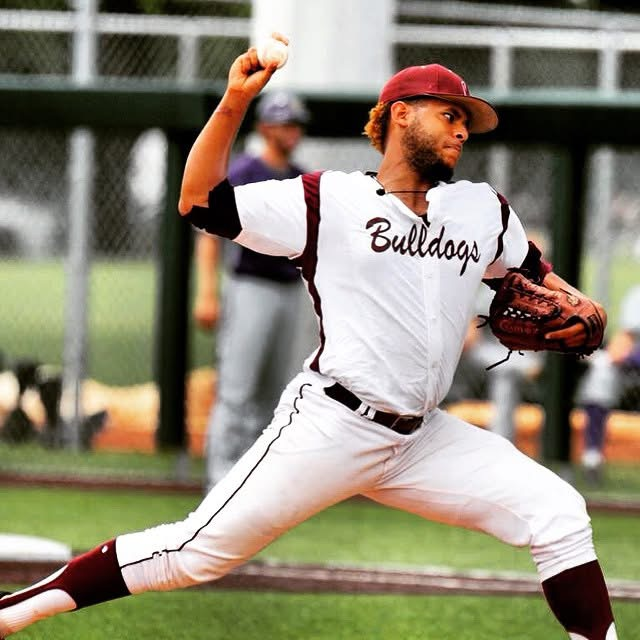

Biographical details
- Born: 1990 (age 35–36); Miami, Florida

Playing career
- 2009–2014: Alabama A&M
- Position: Pitcher

Coaching career (HC unless noted)
- 2015–2017: Alabama A&M (Recruting Coordinator, Head assistant coach)
- 2018–2020: Alabama A&M

Head coaching record
- Overall: 19–49
- Tournaments: SWAC 0–0; NCAA: 0–0

Accomplishments and honors

Awards
- Swac All Tournament Team 2014

Manuel A Lora is an American baseball coach and former pitcher. He played college baseball at Alabama A&M for coaches Demetrius Mitchell, Rafael Belliard (Interim), Eddie Mac, Michael Thompkins and Mitch Hill from 2009 to 2014. He returned to his alma mater in 2015 as an assistant coach. He served as the head coach of the Alabama A&M Bulldogs (2017–2020).

Current role as head baseball and men’s and woman’s cross country coach at Tanner High School in Tanner, Alabama. Serving as a Family and Consumer Science teacher and FCCLA advisor.

== Playing career ==
Lora attended Hialeah-Miami Lakes High School in Hialeah, Florida. Lora played for the school's varsity baseball team. Lora then enrolled at Alabama A&M University, to play college baseball for the Alabama A&M Bulldogs baseball team.

During his freshman campaign, he made five starts in 15 total appearances and posted a 3.00 earned run average (ERA) and a 4–1 W–L record. Lora also registered 39 strikeouts (SO) and 13 walks (BB) in 42 innings pitched (IP). His four wins tied for the team lead.

Lora freshmen debut came in the season-opening sweep of Tuskegee University, where he earned a win in Game 2 by pitching 7 innings, striking out 11 batters, walking one and allowing one hit and one unearned run in an 11-1 victory.

In his sophomore year, Lora posted a 2–6 record in 10 starts, 13 appearances with 50 SO and just 16 BB and a 5.31 ERA in 61 IP. Despite the teams struggles in SWAC Play, Lora delivered a strong performance in a 10-0 doubleheader win over University of New Orleans where he pitched 7 scoreless innings, allowing 9 hits and striking out 4.

Later college seasons

Lora had limited appearances in 2012 and appeared in just one game in 2013 due to medical redshirt and surgery.

As a redshirt senior in 2014 season, Manny Lora served as a relief pitcher. The arrival of Mitch Hill as head coach in 2014 marker a transition that influenced performance and expanding opportunities in the bullpen. Lora responded with 15 relief outings posting a 5-4 record with 4.91 ERA, 27.1 innings pitched, 31 strikeouts, and 5 saves, while issuing 7 walks. These efforts contributed to Alabama A&M’s record of 21-32 overall and 12-8 Southwestern Athletic Conference mark (official record vacated to 0-32 by NCAA infractions), securing a spot in the SWAC Tournament. In the 2014 SWAC Tournament held in New Orleans, the Bulldogs advances by defeating Prairie View A&M 11-5 in their opening game, the program’s first tournament win in over a decade. Lora relieve in the game, pitching 5 innings with 10

strikeouts. Over his full college tenure from 2009 to 2014, Lora appeared in 44 games with 18 starts, accumulating 11 wins, 151 strikeouts, and a career ERA of 4.09 based on available detailed records.

== Coaching career ==
In 2015, Lora joined the Alabama A&M staff as the team's pitching coach and recruiting coordinator. On June 25, 2017, Mitch Hill resigned from his position at Alabama A&M and accepted the head coaching job at Martin Methodist College, and on July 7, 2017, Lora was named the interim head coach at Alabama A&M. On August 23, 2017, Lora was promoted to head coach of Alabama A&M. Lora would not return as head coach in 2021.

Post-collegiate coaching

Lora was appointed head baseball coach at Tanner High School in Alabama, a class 2A program, where he began leading the Rattlers in the 2021 season. In addition, Lora serves as a Family and Consuner Sciences teacher at the school. Under Lora’s guidance, the Tanner Rattlers achieved a notable milestone in the 2022 season by snapping a five season losing streak, earning their first varsity win since 2017, a 14-10 victory over Class 6A Columbia High School on March 21. Last season 2026, included a 5-12 record showing improvements. Around 2023, Lora also joined McGill University in Canada as hitting coach for the baseball team. Lora tenure emphasizes player development and community ties, through specific college commitments. He maintains involvement with Perfect Game, contributing to youth baseball scouting and events in Alabama.

== Head coaching record ==
Record table
Season	Team	Overall	Conference	Standing	Postseason
Alabama A&M Bulldogs (Southwestern Athletic Conference) (2019–2020)
2019	Alabama A&M	16–35	12–11	3rd (East)	ineligible
2020	Alabama A&M	3–14	3–3	(East)	Season canceled due to COVID-19
Alabama A&M:		19–49	15–14		
Total:		19–49			
National champion Postseason invitational champion Conference regular season champion Conference regular season and conference tournament champion Division regular season champion Division regular season and conference tournament champion Conference tournament champion
