= Cristian Amigo =

Chilean-American composer, guitarist, and ethnomusicologist

Cristian Amigo (born 1963) is an American composer, improviser, guitarist, sound designer, and ethnomusicologist. His compositional and performing output includes blues and soul, music for the theater, chamber and orchestral music, opera, avant-jazz and rock music, and art/pop song. He has also recorded solo albums on the innova, Deep Ecology and BA labels. Amigo earned a Ph.D. in ethnomusicology from UCLA where he focused on the music of Chile, Peru, and Argentina, as well as anthropological theory, critical studies, and intercultural aesthetics. While in graduate school, he was second guitarist to the Peruvian Afro-Criollo guitarist Carlos Hayre, with whom he played in concerts and festivals including the World Festival of Sacred Music. He is currently composer-in-residence at INTAR Theater in New York City and Music/Design/Production Faculty @ CalArts School of Theater Department of Experience Design and Production in Valencia, California.

His awards include the John Simon Guggenheim Fellowship in music composition, a Senior Fulbright Scholar/Teacher/Artist Award (Bolivia 2016–2019), and the Van Leir Fellowship from Meet the Composer. His work has also been supported and/or produced by organizations including the Brooklyn Philharmonic, New York Foundation for the Arts (NYFA), New York City Opera, Jerome Foundation, American Composers Forum, New York State Music Fund, Mid Atlantic Arts Foundation, Danish Arts Council, Smithsonian Institution Center for Folklife and Cultural Heritage, Yale Institute of Sacred Music, LAByrinth Theater Company, Boy Scouts of America, José Limón Dance Company, Sundance Institute's Film Composer Labs, UCLA Center for Intercultural Performance (APPEX/Asian Pacific Performance Exchange), CSI (CUNY) Foundation, ASK Playwright/Composer Labs, Durfee Foundation, Teatro del Pueblo (Minneapolis), Woolly Mammoth Theatre Company (Washington, D.C.), INTAR, Oslo Elsewhere, and the 24 Hour Plays. His film scores have been featured at the Sundance Film Festival and the Asian Pacific Film and Video Festival in Los Angeles. His writing appears in the college reader The Conscious Reader, and the Grateful Dead Live in Concert (MacFarland).

== Early life and education ==
Born in Santiago, Chile, Amigo emigrated with his family to the United States as a child. His father Raul Amigo hosted a radio program on a local New Haven, CT. station which focused on the relationship between the music of Latin America and American popular music. At 12 years old, he began studying music with Joseph Torello in New Haven, Connecticut. Two years later the family moved to Miami, and Amigo began performing with a rock band he formed, Six Feet Under. He attended Hialeah-Miami Lakes Senior High School (HML) and while a student there taught classes in guitar to his peers. During his time at HML, Amigo took courses in music theory, classical guitar, and jazz at Miami-Dade Community College.

He entered the music program at Florida State University in 1980 at the age 17. While there he studied classical guitar under Bruce Holzman. After earning an Associate of Arts diploma from FSU, Amigo moved to Miami and actively performed in recording sessions and original and cover bands while attending music classes at University of Miami. His first recording session at age 17 was the top 40 Narada Michael Walden-produced "We Don't Have To Take Our Clothes Off" by Jermaine Stewart. He moved Los Angeles to pursue music and a university education and earned a Bachelor of Arts degree in political science from California State University, Northridge, and both a Master of Arts and Doctor of Philosophy in Ethnomusicology from the University of California, Los Angeles. He also studied jazz with Kenny Burrell and Gary Pratt, and the sitar with Harihar Rao. His professors at UCLA included Anthony Seeger, Susan McClary, Edwin Seroussi, Tara Browner, Ali Jihad Racy, and Jacqueline Djedje. In LA he also studied composition with Wadada Leo Smith for a short time.

== Career ==
Amigo began working as a professional musician in Miami at age 14. He studied at Miami-Dade Community College with Vincent Bredice, Lou Mowad, and George Aguiar while in High School. He played in top 40 bands and worked as a session guitarist on jingles and records and collaborated with and was in the local music scene with many future well known musicians (Alain Berge, Narada Michael Walden, Raul Malo, Nil Lara, Froilan "Fro" Sosa, Lee Levin, John Joseph). He moved to LA in 1986 to pursue music and a university education.

While a university student in California, Amigo made a living as an assistant travel agent, a janitor, a session guitarist, band leader, music producer, film composer, jingle producer (Kraft, JC Penney, California Dept of Health Services, Toyota), concert producer (Jazz at the Wadsworth), and music teacher (Plaza de la Raza, OnRamp Arts, Music Center). He performed in a number of bands in Los Angeles, including African, Arabic, funk, hard rock, free jazz, jazz, and reggae groups. He recorded two records with the local funk-rock band SPEAK (with Ed Barguiarena, David J. Carpenter, and Evan Stone) and released two recordings with them on BA Records. He worked as a session guitarist with artists including Hans Zimmer, Mark Mancina, Jay Rifkin, Les Hooper, Wadada Leo Smith, David Ornette Cherry, John Van Tongeron, Justo Almario, and others.

Amigo's artistic career had a major breakthrough while doing research for his Ph.D. in New York City during the summer of 2001. He was hired for a gig with the Afro-Peruvian guitarist Carlos Hayre. Hayre invited Amigo to become his second guitarist. He performed with Hayre on tour in many concerts, including the 2002 World Festival of Sacred Music in Los Angeles and the Brava Theater in San Francisco. Amigo remained based in New York City, and accolades soon followed. He was awarded a Guggenheim Fellowship in music composition in 2006, the Van Lier Fellowship from Meet the Composer. In 2016–17, Amigo was named a Fulbright Scholar for his artistic work. His works has been supported and/or produced by organizations including the Brooklyn Philharmonic, New York Foundation for the Arts (NYFA), New York City Opera, Jerome Foundation, American Composers Forum, New York State Music Fund, Mid Atlantic Arts Foundation, Danish Arts Council, Smithsonian Institution Center for Folklife and Cultural Heritage, Yale Institute of Sacred Music, LAByrinth Theater Company, Boy Scouts of America, José Limón Dance Company, Sundance Institute's Film Composer Labs, UCLA Center for Intercultural Performance (APPEX/Asian Pacific Performance Exchange), CSI (CUNY) Foundation, ASK Playwright/Composer Labs, Durfee Foundation, Teatro del Pueblo (Minneapolis), Woolly Mammoth Theatre Company (Washington, D.C.), INTAR, Oslo Elsewhere, and the 24 Hour Plays. His film scores have been featured at the Sundance Film Festival and the Asian Pacific Film and Video Festival in Los Angeles.

Amigo moved to New York City from LA in 2003, and quickly established himself on the Latin music, free improv, "new music", and theater scenes. Some new and recent projects include producing 25 Years of New York New Music(innova Recordings) – a 10 CD anthology of New York new music composers (Meredith Monk, Pauline Oliveros, Annea Lockwood, Rudresh Mahanthappa, Fred Ho, Joan Tower, + 54 more, three solo CDs Cristian Amigo: Live LA Sessions (BA Records), Kingdom of Jones (innova), The Buzzy Garden (innova), and collaborations/works with Eve Beglarian, violinist Mary Rowell ETHEL, Lost Dog New Music Ensemble, Elliott Sharp, Dom Minasi, Miguel Frasconi, Hans Tammen, Corey Dargel, JACK Quartet, pianist Jenny Lin, Jason Hwang's Spontaneous River Orchestra, Izzi Ramkissoon's Electric Eel Multimedia Ensemble, ARK Guitar Trio, choreographer Jill Sigman/thinkdance, librettists Royce Vavrek and Emily Conbere, drummer Andrew Drury, drummer/composer Gustavo Aguilar, and the Guidonian Hand among many others.

Amigo composed the music for the play 3 Truths by Naomi Ilzuka (Cornerstone Theatre/Grand Performances-LA), "Evening all Afternoon" by Anna Zeigler (New Georges), Killing Play by Dave Anzuelo (Rattlestick Theater-NYC), Michael John Garce's Points of Departure, and the opera Notes on the Balinese Cockfight with librettist Renato Rosaldo.

== List of works (partial) ==
- 100 Americana Songs + 50 More (2010–2012)
- Heart Sutra (2012)
- The Buzzy Garden (2012) – nono/nona Recordings
- Notes on the Balinese Cockfight (2012–) with librettist Renato Rosaldo and composer Gustavo Aguilar, opera in progress
- Amigo/Aguilar Duo (2012) – nono/nona Recordings
- Cristian Amigo and Blaise Siwula Live (2012)
- Cristian Amigo and Gustavo Aguilar Live (2012)
- Moving Through Systems (2011)
- Cristian Amigo and Dom Minasi Live (2012)
- Three Truths (2011) by Naomi Izuka
- The UMF Book of Notations (2011)
- (outsidein) Guitar Quartet No. 1 (2011)
- Right Here, Right Now (2011)
- Testosterone Jam (2011)
- A Bad Time To Be A Fish (2012)
- The Gotham Roots Orchestra (2012) – nono/nona Recordings
- Trombones of Doom (2011)
- Solo or Group Event No. 1 (2011)
- CCR Music (2011)
- Western Spaces (2011) song trio with librettist Royce Vavrek
- 7 for solo piano (for Jenny Lin) (2011)
- The MOMA Yellow Notebook (2011)
- Cosmicomics #1 for clarinet, cello, and electric guitar (2011)
- for/4guitars: electric guitar quartet (2011)
- Clementine in the Lower Ninth (2009) by Brad Dietz
- Picasso: Payaso (2008–) opera in progress
- String Quartet No. 2/Ambiguous Dog (2008)
- Songs from Jose (2008)
- Kingdom of Jones (2008) CD, innova Recordings
- Dos/Two: Fieldnotes (2008) CD – BA Records
- Minotaur (2008) – by David Anzuelo
- Nylons (2008) one-act opera
- Killing Play (2007)
- ABC Identity Songs for piano, violin, clarinet, and 2 perc. (2007)
- Brooklyn Dances for Orchestra (2007)
- Songs from a Socialist Cabaret (2007)
- Songs from José (2007)
- Salsalandia (2007) by Juan Felipe Herrera
- String Quartet No. 1 (2007)
- Ten One-Minute Pieces (2007) – Danish Intuitive Music Conference
- Swoony Planet (2006) – by Han Ong
- Rosmersholm (2006) by Henrik Ibsen
- deathvariations (2006) – by Jon Fosse
- Monk Sketches (2006) – Twelve instrumental pieces for electric quartet
- Echoes of Latin America (2006) – Teatro del Pueblo (Minneapolis)
- Routes of Folklore (2006)
- Points of Departure (2006) – by Michael John Garcé
- Impressions of Energy for cello and guitar (2005) – CSI/CUNY
- Cristian Amigo: Live LA Sessions (2005) CD – BA Records
- Monk Sketches (2005)
- Grace (2005) by Craig Wright
- Soldados (2004)
- Thunderweavers (2003)
- The Upside Down Boy (2003) by Juan Felipe Herrera
- Folklore Neoyorquino (2002)
- Time, Emit Time (2001) – Asian Pacific Performance Exchange (APPEX)
- Three film shorts (1999) – Sundance Film Festival
- Overstay (1997) – a film by Ann Kaneko
- Essence (1998) – BA Records
- 35 Miles From Normal (1997) – a film by Mark Schwahn
- SPEAK (1997) – BA Records
