= Louis Crews =

American athlete and sports coach (1917–2005)

Biographical details
- Born: March 27, 1917; Bessemer, Alabama, U.S.
- Died: January 20, 2005 (aged 87); Huntsville, Alabama, U.S.

Playing career

Football
- 1937–1940: Alabama A&M
- Positions: Quarterback, running back

Coaching career (HC unless noted)

Football
- 1950–1956: Alcorn A&M (backfield)
- 1957–1959: Jarvis Christian
- 1960–1975: Alabama A&M

Baseball
- 1950–1957, 1959 (Note: The Alcorn State Braves media guide lists Crews as the team's first head coach, serving in 1959 and compiling a 7–7 record. Newspaper reports from 1960 discussing Crews' career state he coached the team from 1950 to 1957, and not in 1959.): Alcorn A&M
- Unknown: Alabama A&M

Men's basketball
- 1957–1960: Jarvis Christian

Women's basketball
- 1950–1957 Note (Note: Crews was said to have coached at Wilberforce University from 1946 to 1947 and is listed in one source as also having had a stint at Bishop College; however, the sports he coached are unknown.): Alcorn A&M

Administrative career (AD unless noted)
- 1957–1959: Jarvis Christian

Head coaching record
- Overall: 108–64–3 (football); 40–16 (men's basketball)
- Bowls: 0–1

Accomplishments and honors

Championships
- Football; 5 SIAC (1962–1963, 1966, 1971–1972); Baseball; 1 SCAC (1953); 1 SIAC (?); Women's basketball 2 SCAC (1951, 1952)

Louis C. Crews (March 27, 1917 – January 20, 2005) was an American athlete and sports coach. He was best known for his time as head football coach at Alabama A&M University, a position he held from 1960 to 1975. He also was head baseball and women's basketball coach at Alcorn Agricultural and Mechanical College (now known as Alcorn State University), head baseball coach at Alabama A&M, and served as head football and men's basketball coach at Jarvis Christian College. He is the all-time winningest head coach of the Alabama A&M Bulldogs football program. The team plays home games at Louis Crews Stadium, named in his honor.

== Early life and education ==
Crews was born in Bessemer, Alabama, in c. 1918. He attended Dunbar High School and graduated in 1936, later playing college football for the Alabama A&M Bulldogs from 1937 to 1940. Playing quarterback and running back, he scored the Bulldogs' first-ever touchdown in the Magic City Classic. He graduated in 1941, being part of the first four-year graduating class at the school. Afterwards, he joined the United States Army and served four years, also playing football during this time. Upon finishing his duty, Crews enrolled at Ohio State University, at which he received a Bachelor of Science degree in physical education. He later earned a Master of Science and director's degree from Indiana University, and received a diploma from Yale University.

== Coaching career ==
Crews began his coaching career at Wilberforce University in 1946, serving until 1947 as a physical education teacher and coach. According to The Huntsville Times, after this he served with Bishop College. Crews began serving as a coach and physical education teacher at Alcorn Agricultural and Mechanical College (now known as Alcorn State University) in 1950, and was the head baseball coach, head women's basketball coach, and assistant football coach, serving with the backfield. He was in these roles through 1957, and led the women's basketball team to two South Central Athletic Conference (SCAC) championships (1951 and 1952) and the baseball team to a SCAC title in 1953.

Crews served as athletic director, head football coach and head men's basketball coach at Jarvis Christian College (now known as Jarvis Christian University) from 1957 to 1960. He went 14–12 as football coach and 40–16 in basketball. He also returned to Alcorn A&M in 1959 to coach the baseball team, leading them to a 7–7 record, according to the school's media guide.

In 1960, Crews was appointed head football coach at Alabama Agricultural and Mechanical College (now known as Alabama A&M University), succeeding George H. Hobson. He went on to serve 16 years in the position, and is widely credited with "setting the tone" for the football program. The Bulldogs had won just one game in the last season, and had scored more than 20 points in a game only ten times in the previous decade. In his first year, he led them to a 7–1 record and was named the conference coach of the year. By his fourth year, he had led them to an overall mark of 31–4 and in 1963 they went undefeated. At the 1963 Birmingham Grid Forecasters' banquet, he was named the "College Football Coach of the Year." His football teams won five Southern Intercollegiate Athletic Conference (SIAC) championships and compiled a record of 94–52–3 by the time he left the school following the 1975 season, making him Alabama A&M's all-time winningest football coach. He also coached their baseball team and led them to their only conference championship in history.

In football, Crews was considered a great offensive coach and used tactics that were ahead of his time. He was known for his tendency for using passing and trap plays. Crews often used a plan called third man out, which involved a running back doing a route in addition to the ends, a play that was almost unheard of during that time. He also developed a set of plays which he described as the "L offense," in which the "fullback and tailback lined up behind tackle and a wingback and split end set to the opposite side of the formation." His offenses were high scoring, with the team averaging over 32 points-per-game one year, when in the decade prior to his arrival they had scored more than 20 in a single game only ten times.

== Later life and death ==
Crews died on January 20, 2005, at the age of 87, in Huntsville, Alabama.

Crews was inducted into both the Alcorn State Athletic Hall of Fame and the Alabama A&M Athletic Hall of Fame. He was also inducted into the SIAC Hall of Fame, and Alabama A&M named their stadium in his honor. The Louis Crews Classic, Alabama A&M's first home game of each season, was named in his honor.

== Head coaching record ==
=== Football ===
| Year | Team | Overall | Conference | Standing | Bowl/playoffs |
|---|---|---|---|---|---|
Jarvis Christian Bulldogs () (1957–1959)
| 1957 | Jarvis Christian | 3–5 | | | |
| 1958 | Jarvis Christian | 5–4 | | | |
| 1959 | Jarvis Christian | 6–3 | | | |
| Jarvis Christian: | | 14–12 | | | |
Alabama A&M Bulldogs (Southern Intercollegiate Athletic Conference) (1960–1975)
| 1960 | Alabama A&M | 7–1 | 5–0 | 2nd | |
| 1961 | Alabama A&M | 8–1 | 5–0 | 2nd | |
| 1962 | Alabama A&M | 8–2 | 6–0 | T–1st | |
| 1963 | Alabama A&M | 8–0 | 7–0 | 1st | |
| 1964 | Alabama A&M | 6–1–1 | | | |
| 1965 | Alabama A&M | 5–4 | | | |
| 1966 | Alabama A&M | 8–1 | 6–0 | 1st | L Orange Blossom Classic |
| 1967 | Alabama A&M | 4–4–1 | | (Division I) | |
| 1968 | Alabama A&M | 5–4 | 2–3 | 4th (Division I) | |
| 1969 | Alabama A&M | 6–3 | 2–2 | 2nd (Division I) | |
| 1970 | Alabama A&M | 5–4 | | | |
| 1971 | Alabama A&M | 5–6 | 4–3 | T–1st | |
| 1972 | Alabama A&M | 7–1–1 | 6–0–1 | T–1st | |
| 1973 | Alabama A&M | 5–5 | 3–2 | T–3rd (Division I) | |
| 1974 | Alabama A&M | 4–7 | 1–4 | T–5th (Division I) | |
| 1975 | Alabama A&M | 3–8 | 2–3 | 5th (Division I) | |
| Alabama A&M: | | 94–52–3 | | | |
| Total: | | 108–64–3 | | | |
