= Tarik Cohen =

American football player (born 1995)

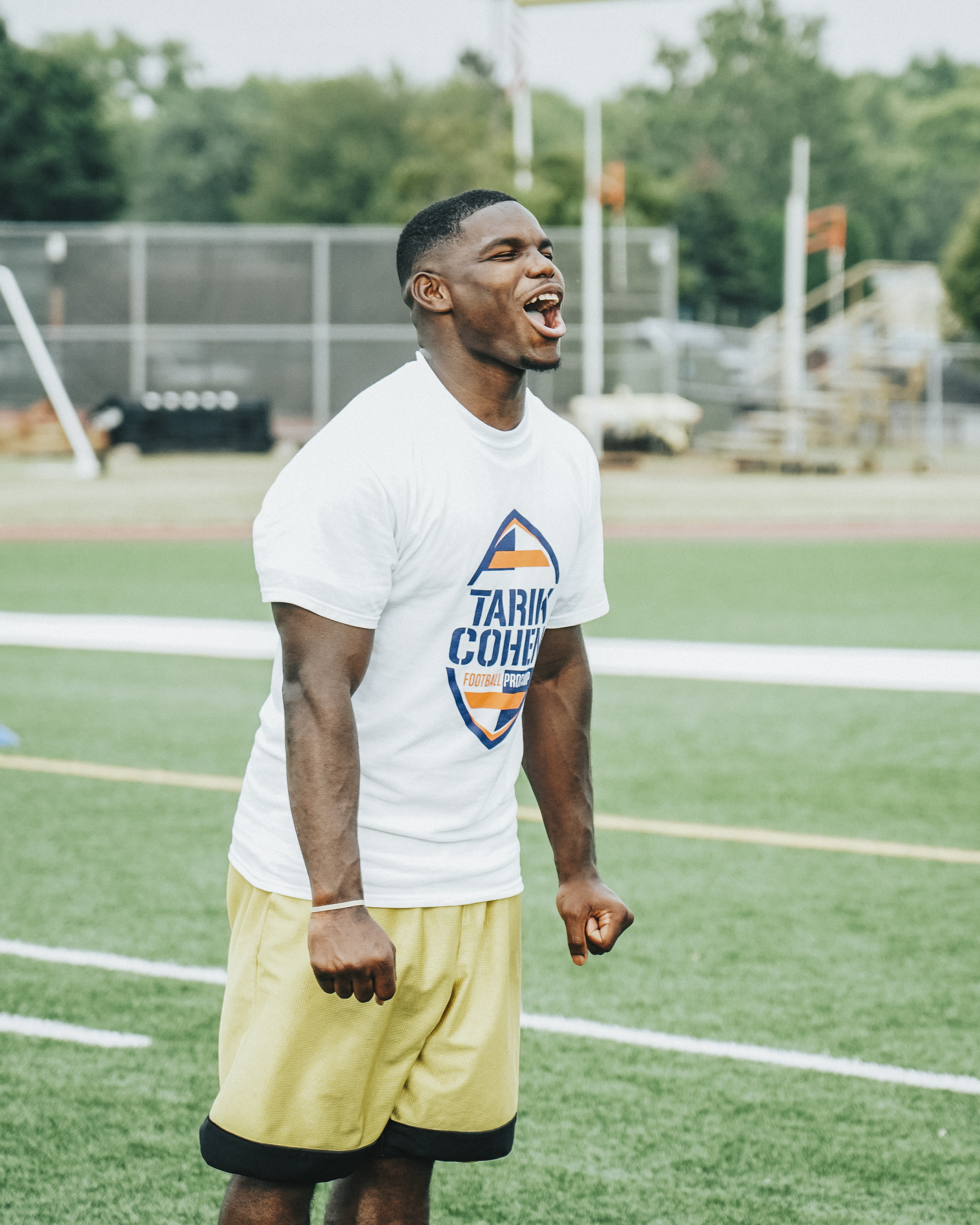
- Cohen at his youth camp in 2019

No. 29
- Positions: Running back, return specialist

Personal information
- Born: July 26, 1995 (age 31); Bunn, North Carolina, U.S.
- Listed height: 5 ft 6 in (1.68 m)
- Listed weight: 191 lb (87 kg)

Career information
- High school: Bunn
- College: North Carolina A&T (2013–2016)
- NFL draft: 2017: 4th round, 119th overall pick

Career history
- Chicago Bears (2017–2021); Carolina Panthers (2023–2024)*; New York Jets (2024)*
- * Offseason or practice squad member only

Awards and highlights
- First-team All-Pro (2018) (Note: Selected as a punt returner); Pro Bowl (2018); Black college football national champion (2015); Black College Football Pro Player of the Year Award (2019); Celebration Bowl champion (2015); Celebration Bowl Offensive MVP (2015); Deacon Jones Trophy (2016); Walter Camp FCS All-American (2016); 2× SBN All-American (2014, 2015); AFCA FCS Coaches Second-team All-American (2016); CSN Fabulous Fifty FCS All-American (2015); SBN/Williams Offensive Player of the Year (2015); 3× STATS FCS Third-team All-American (2014–2016); 3× BOXTOROW All-American (2014–2016); 3× MEAC Offensive Player of the Year (2014–2016); 3× First-team All-MEAC (2013–2015); MEAC Rookie of the Year (2013)

Career NFL statistics
- Rushing yards: 1,101
- Rushing average: 4.2
- Receptions: 209
- Receiving yards: 1,575
- Return yards: 1,613
- Total touchdowns: 15
- Stats at Pro Football Reference

Tarik Cohen (born July 26, 1995) is an American former professional football player who was a running back for five seasons for the Chicago Bears of the National Football League (NFL). He played college football for the North Carolina A&T Aggies, and was selected by the Chicago Bears in the fourth round of the 2017 NFL draft.

== Early life ==
Cohen attended Bunn High School in his hometown of Bunn, North Carolina, excelling at football and track & field for the Wildcats athletic teams. As a senior, he helped lead the Wildcats to a 9–3 record and a third-round finish in the 2011 NCHSAA 2A playoffs. In his two years on the varsity team, he rushed for a total 808 yards, including 252 earned in a single game. He earned team MVP and all-conference honors in football and state championships in Track as he was part of the North Carolina High School Athletic Association Class 2A state champion 4×100 meter relay team.

== College career ==
Cohen's size was a point of concern to many schools interested in recruiting him for football. As a result, North Carolina A&T was the only Division I school to offer Cohen a football scholarship, which he accepted.

=== 2013 season ===
As a freshman, starting in six of the 11 games played in the 2013 season, Cohen was positioned as a part of a group of freshmen players poised to take over the Aggie program after senior running backs Ricky Lewis and Dominique Drake graduated. Since Lewis would, however, get injured, and Drake was sidelined with a concussion, Cohen was able to prove his value in the October 12 game against Hampton. In that game, Cohen carried the ball 22 times for 180 yards and a touchdown. Cohen followed up his performance two weeks later with 32 carries for 210 yards and three touchdowns against Florida A&M. Cohen completed his freshman season leading the Mid-Eastern Athletic Conference (MEAC) with 1,148 rushing yards and the conference's rookie of the year honors. Cohen's performance made him the first A&T freshman to break the 1,000 yard mark and only the third freshman in MEAC history to do so.

=== 2014 season ===
Cohen began his sophomore season with three consecutive 100+ rushing yard games, rushing for 161 yards in the season opener against Alabama A&M, 133 yards against Coastal Carolina, and a career-best 234 yards against Elon. Cohen also posted 236 all-purpose yards (155 rushing and 81 receiving), in the October 9 game against Hampton and closed the season with 203 yards against arch rival North Carolina Central. Cohen finished the 2014 season with 1,340 rushing yards and 15 touchdowns, both being the second-highest single-season totals in A&T history. Cohen also earned MEAC co-offensive player of the year, along with All-American recognition from SBN, BoxtoRow, and Stats FCS.

=== 2015 season ===
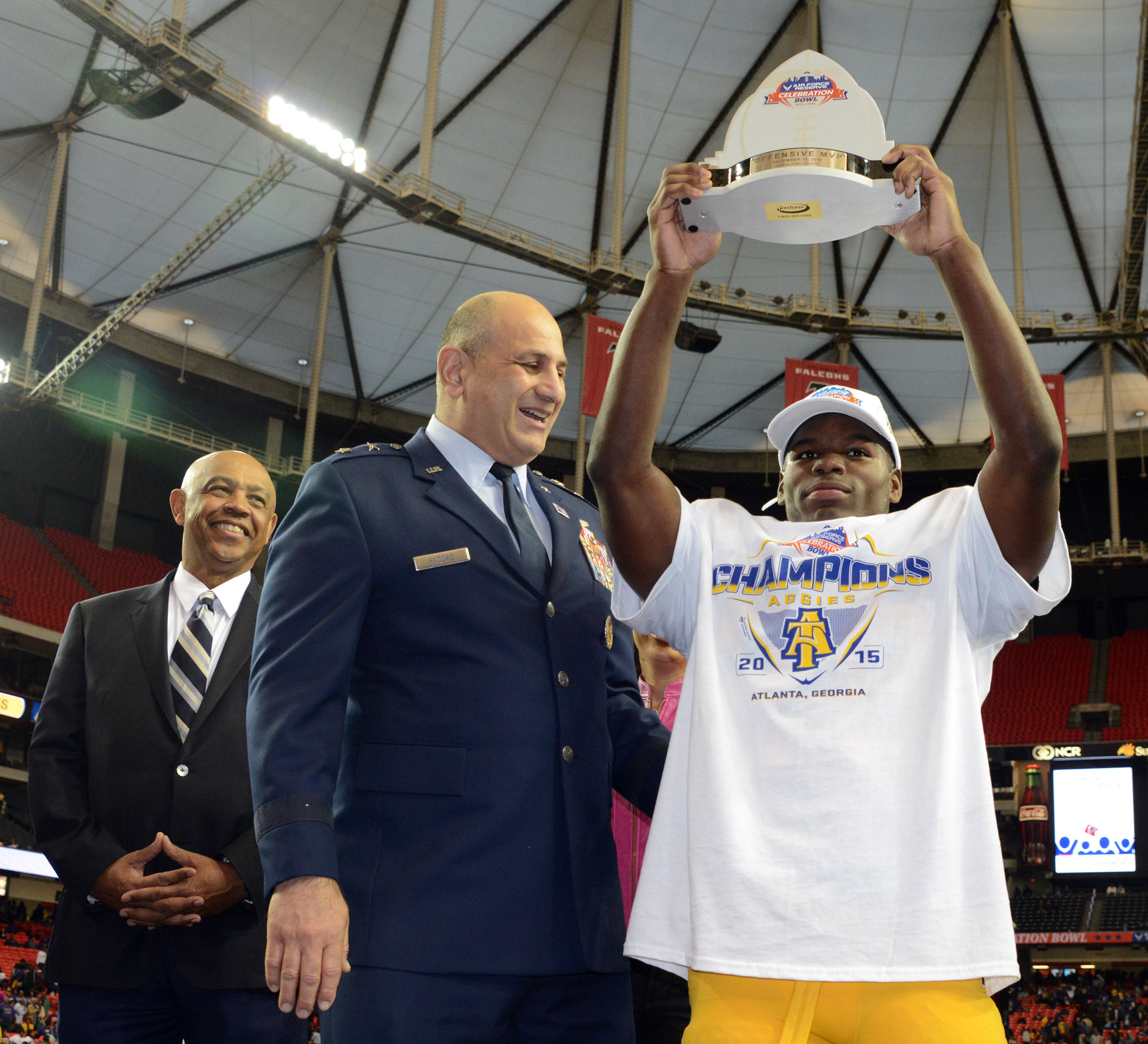
Cohen receiving the Offensive MVP award at the 2015 Celebration Bowl

In the summer before the 2015 season, a YouTube video of Cohen completing catches while simultaneously doing backflips became popular across multiple social media platforms and led to an appearance on ESPN's SportsCenter where he demonstrated the catches on live television. Cohen's 2015 season was highlighted by a number of record-setting performances including a career-best 295 yards, and offensive MVP recognition, at the 2015 Celebration Bowl. Cohen's other accomplishments from the season include: multiple single-season school records with 1,543 total rushing yards, 264 carries and 15 touchdowns, equaling the record he set the season before. Cohen also earned MEAC Offensive Player of the year for the second consecutive year, along with all-American recognition from College Sporting News, Sheridan Broadcasting Network, BoxtoRow, and Stats FCS. Cohen was also the SBN Offensive Player of the Year.

=== 2016 season ===
Cohen began his final collegiate season by breaking a number of school records. In the 2016 season opener against Division II St. Augustine's, Cohen's two touchdowns put him over the record for receiving and rushing touchdowns at 42. In the September 29, 2016, game against Division I FBS Kent State, Cohen would continue breaking records as his 256-yard and three-touchdown performance broke both Stoney Polite's 41 career rushing touchdown record and James White's 25-year record for longest run from scrimmage at 89 yards. In the October 15, 2016, game against Bethune-Cookman, Cohen became the first player in school history to rush for at least 200 yards in three consecutive games. Cohen's A&T career would end with him becoming the MEAC's all-time leading rusher with 5,619 yards. Cohen's performance also made him the first player in school history to pass the 5,000 career rushing yard mark. Cohen ended his final season as the first player in MEAC history to be named conference offensive player of the year for 3 consecutive seasons. His performance would also make him the MEAC's all-time leading rusher, and the first player in school history to break the 5,000-yard mark. On the national level, Cohen was placed on the watch lists for national awards such as the Deacon Jones Trophy, which he won, and the Walter Payton Award, where he ultimately finished fifth in the voting. Cohen also earned All-American recognition from several national organizations and media outlets including: the NCAA, STATS FCS and BoxToRow. He was also named to the 2016 Walter Camp Football Championship Subdivision All-American team and he was named a second-team AFCA Football Championship Subdivision Coaches’ All-American selection. In addition to setting new School and Conference rushing yardage records, Cohen further cemented his legacy by breaking the single-season touchdown record with 19 and tying the school record for the single-season rushing touchdowns record with 18. He also holds other school records including rushing touchdowns, total touchdowns, and total points at 56, 59, and 339 respectively. Cohen closed his college career by playing in the 2017 NFLPA Collegiate Bowl.

== Professional career ==
=== Pre-draft ===
According to Alex Marvez of the Sporting News, Cohen had been in talks with and also worked out for several teams going into the 2017 NFL draft including the Philadelphia Eagles, New York Jets, Chicago Bears, Denver Broncos, and Green Bay Packers. Cohen's size and abilities drew many comparisons to Darren Sproles, and he was projected to be a sixth-round pick in the upcoming draft. Cohen was among the 330 NFL hopefuls invited to participate in the 2017 NFL Scouting Combine. At a height of 5 ft 6 in (1.68 m), he was the smallest running back in attendance, where he ran the third fastest 40-yard (37 m) dash time among the running backs at 4.42 seconds.

Pre-draft measurables
| Height | Weight | Arm length | Hand span | Wingspan | 40-yard dash | 10-yard split | 20-yard split | 20-yard shuttle | Three-cone drill | Vertical jump | Broad jump | Bench press |
|---|---|---|---|---|---|---|---|---|---|---|---|---|
| 5 ft 6 1/2 in (1.69 m) | 179 lb (81 kg) | 29 3/4 in (0.76 m) | 10 1/8 in (0.26 m) | 5 ft 11 1/4 in (1.81 m) | 4.42 s | 1.47 s | 2.59 s | 4.27 s | 7.22 s | 31.5 in (0.80 m) | 9 ft 10 in (3.00 m) | 11 reps |
All values from NFL Combine/Pro Day

=== Chicago Bears ===
==== 2017 season ====
Cohen was selected by the Bears in the fourth round, 119th overall, of the 2017 NFL Draft. He was the tenth running back to be selected in the 2017. In addition, he was the first player from North Carolina A&T to be selected since offensive lineman Junius Coston was selected in the fifth round in 2005 by the Packers. He was one of three non-FBS players taken by the Bears in the draft, the first time since 2002 that the team took three non-FBS players in a single draft.

In the 2017 season, Cohen shared the backfield with Jordan Howard. On September 10, 2017, in his NFL debut, Cohen finished the game with five carries for 66 yards and eight receptions for 47 yards and a touchdown in a 23–17 home loss to the Atlanta Falcons at Soldier Field. In Week 3, a 23–17 overtime victory over the Pittsburgh Steelers, he had 12 carries for 78 yards and four receptions for 24 yards. On October 15, against the Baltimore Ravens, Cohen threw a 21-yard touchdown pass to tight end Zach Miller, making him the shortest player to throw a touchdown since Wee Willie Smith, who also stood at 5 ft 6 in (1.68 m) when he threw a touchdown in 1934. Cohen recorded the first rushing touchdown of his career against the New Orleans Saints at the Mercedes-Benz Superdome during Week 8. On December 3, Cohen returned a punt against the San Francisco 49ers for a 61-yard touchdown in the 15–14 loss in Week 13. He was the second rookie since Gale Sayers in 1965 to record a rushing, passing, receiving, and punt return touchdown. Overall, in his rookie season, Cohen finished with 370 rushing yards, two rushing touchdowns, 358 receiving yards, one receiving touchdown, and one passing touchdown.

==== 2018 season ====
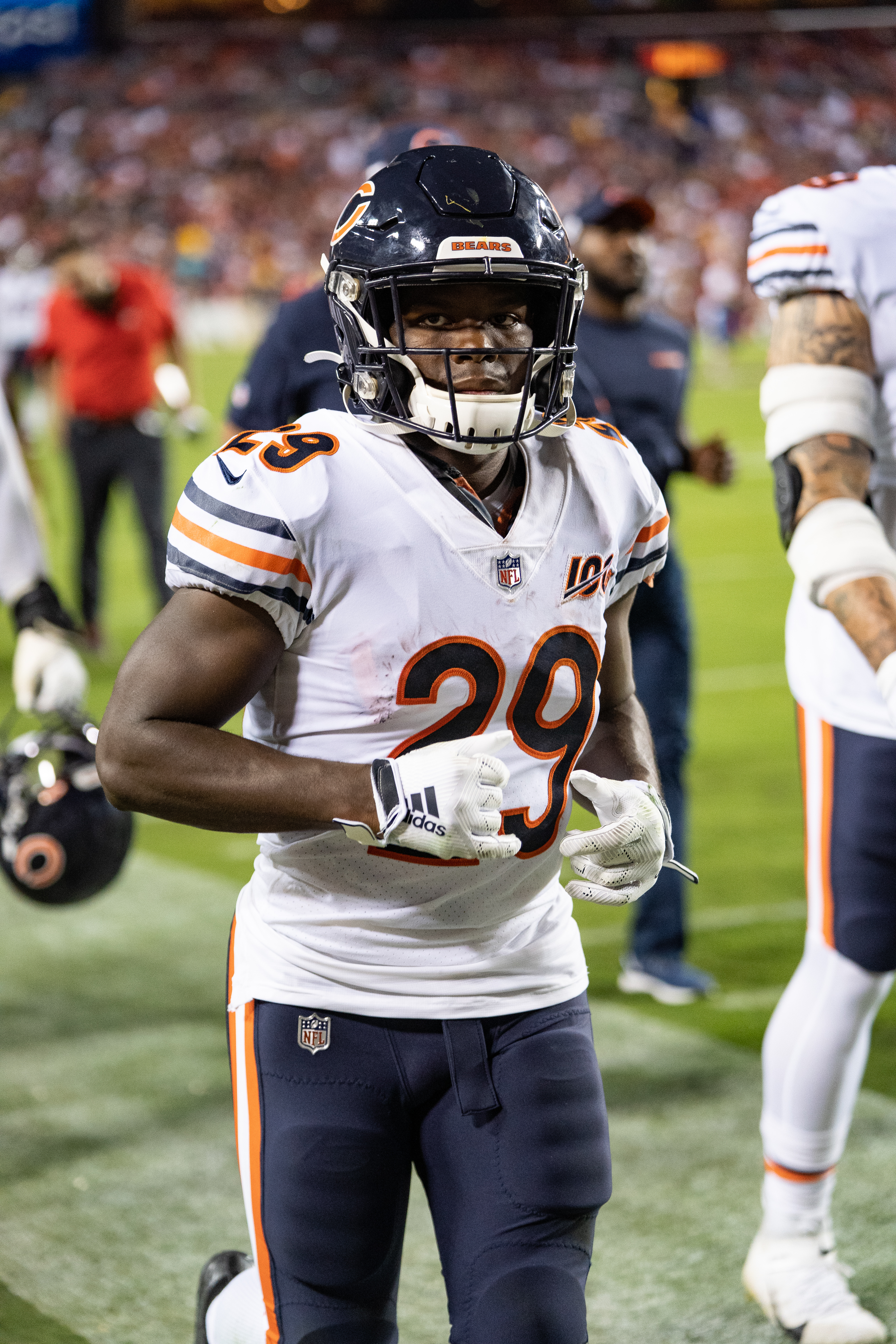
Cohen with the Chicago Bears in 2019

Cohen continued to share the backfield with Howard going into the 2018 season. In Week 4 of the 2018 season, Cohen recorded seven receptions for a career-high 121 receiving yards in the 48–10 victory over the Tampa Bay Buccaneers. On October 14, 2018, Cohen rushed in a 21-yard touchdown and had seven receptions for 90 yards against the Miami Dolphins. In Week 8 against the Jets, Cohen rushed five times for 40 yards and had one catch for 70 yards and a touchdown in the 24–10 victory.

In Week 13 against the New York Giants, Cohen rushed for 30 yards and had 12 catches for 156 yards. On the final play of regulation, with the Bears down by seven points, Cohen was involved in a trick play to tie the game: at the Giants' one-yard line, quarterback Chase Daniel handed off to tight end Trey Burton, who lateraled the ball to Cohen. Noticing Daniel was covered, Cohen threw a pass to Anthony Miller for the touchdown. The Bears eventually lost 30–27 in overtime, but Cohen became the first player ever with at least 30 rushing yards, 150 receiving yards, and a passing touchdown in a game; his 156 receiving yards were the most by a Bears running back since at least 1960.

Cohen finished the season with 444 rushing yards and three touchdowns to go along with 71 catches for 725 receiving yards and five receiving touchdowns, along with a league-leading 411 punt return yards. He was later named to the 2019 Pro Bowl roster and first-team All-Pro as a return specialist. Fellow teammates Khalil Mack, Eddie Jackson, and Kyle Fuller were also named first-team All-Pro. He received an overall grade of 71.6 from Pro Football Focus in 2018, which ranked as the 32nd highest grade among all qualifying running backs. The Bears won the NFC North and earned the #3-seed for the National Football Conference Playoffs. In the Wild Card Round, against the Eagles, Cohen had three receptions for 27 yards in his playoff debut, a 16–15 loss.

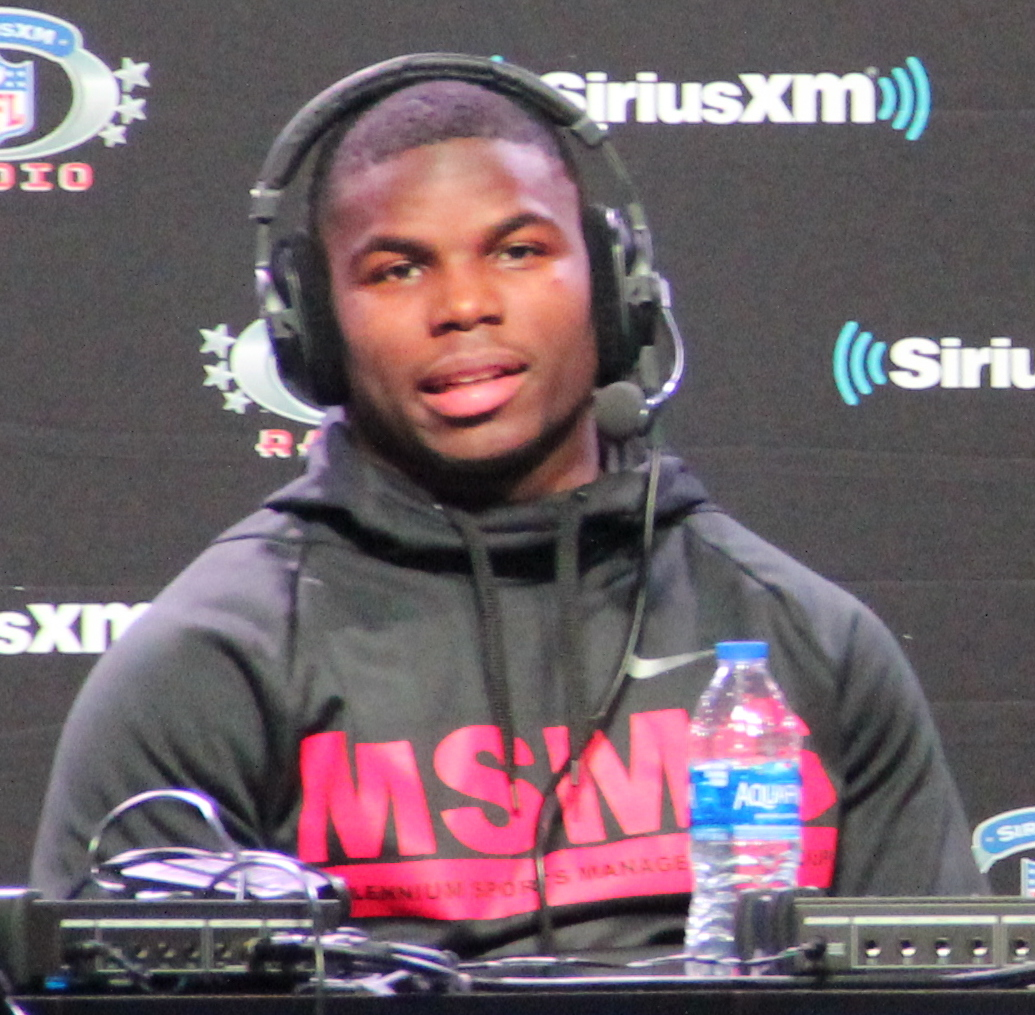
Cohen in 2019

==== 2019 season ====
In Week 4 against the Minnesota Vikings, Cohen rushed five times for 11 yards and caught two passes for seven yards and his first receiving touchdown of the season in the 16–6 win. Overall, Cohen finished the 2019 season with 64 carries for 213 rushing yards to go along with 79 receptions for 456 receiving yards and three receiving touchdowns.

==== 2020 season ====
On September 20, 2020, Cohen signed a three-year, $17.25 million contract extension with the Bears. In Week 3 against the Atlanta Falcons, Cohen was knocked into on a fair catch and suffered tears to his ACL and MCL, as well as a tibial plateau fracture. He was placed on injured reserve two days after the game. His season ended with 74 rushing yards on 14 attempts, and 41 receiving yards on six receptions.

==== 2021 season ====
Cohen was placed on the reserve/physically unable to perform to start the season. He missed the entire 2021 season while recovering from the ACL injury he sustained the previous season. The Bears released Cohen on March 16, 2022.

=== Free agency ===
On May 17, 2022, Cohen suffered a torn Achilles tendon during a training session that was being livestreamed from his Instagram account.

On August 12, 2023, Cohen announced he was attempting an NFL comeback after being cleared to play.

=== Carolina Panthers ===
The Carolina Panthers signed Cohen to their practice squad on September 13, 2023. On November 6, Cohen was placed on the practice squad injured reserve with a hamstring injury. On December 27, Cohen was re-activated to the practice squad.

Cohen signed a reserve/future contract with the Panthers on January 8, 2024. The Panthers released Cohen on May 10, 2024.

=== New York Jets ===
On May 29, 2024, Cohen signed a one-year contract with the New York Jets.

On August 1, 2024, Cohen announced his retirement from professional football.

== Career statistics ==
Legend
| **Bold** | Career high |

=== NFL ===
==== Regular season ====
| Year | Team | Games | | Rushing | | | | | Receiving | | | | | Kick returns | | | | | Punt returns | | | | | All-purpose | | |
| Year | Team | GP | GS | Att | Yds | Avg | Lng | TD | Rec | Yds | Avg | Lng | TD | Ret | Yds | Avg | Lng | TD | Ret | Yds | Avg | Lng | TD | Tch | Yds | TD |
|---|---|---|---|---|---|---|---|---|---|---|---|---|---|---|---|---|---|---|---|---|---|---|---|---|---|---|
| 2017 | CHI | 16 | 4 | 87 | 370 | 4.3 | **46** | 2 | 53 | 353 | 6.7 | **70** | 1 | **26** | **583** | **22.4** | **46** | 0 | 29 | 272 | 9.4 | 61 | **1** | 195 | 1,578 | 4 |
| 2018 | CHI | 16 | 7 | **99** | **444** | 4.5 | 32 | **3** | 71 | **725** | **10.2** | **70T** | **5** | 2 | 22 | 11.0 | 22 | 0 | **33** | **411** | **12.5** | 44 | 0 | **205** | **1,599** | **8** |
| 2019 | CHI | 16 | 11 | 64 | 213 | 3.3 | 19 | 0 | **79** | 456 | 5.8 | 31 | 3 | 2 | 23 | 11.5 | 16 | 0 | **33** | 302 | 9.2 | **71** | 0 | 178 | 994 | 3 |
| 2020 | CHI | 3 | 0 | 14 | 74 | **5.3** | 17 | 0 | 6 | 41 | 6.8 | 20 | 0 | — | — | — | — | — | 1 | 0 | 0.0 | 0 | 0 | 21 | 115 | 0 |
| 2021 | CHI | 0 | 0 | Did not play | | | | | | | | | | | | | | | | | | | | | | |
| 2023 | CAR | 0 | 0 | Did not play | | | | | | | | | | | | | | | | | | | | | | |
| Career | | 51 | 22 | 264 | 1,101 | 4.2 | 46 | 5 | 209 | 1,575 | 7.5 | 70 | 9 | 30 | 628 | 20.9 | 46 | 0 | 96 | 985 | 10.3 | 71 | 1 | 599 | 4,286 | 15 |

==== Postseason ====
| Year | Team | Games | | Rushing | | | | | Receiving | | | | | Kick returns | | | | | Punt returns | | | | | All-purpose | | |
| Year | Team | GP | GS | Att | Yds | Avg | Lng | TD | Rec | Yds | Avg | Lng | TD | Ret | Yds | Avg | Lng | TD | Ret | Yds | Avg | Lng | TD | Tch | Yds | TD |
|---|---|---|---|---|---|---|---|---|---|---|---|---|---|---|---|---|---|---|---|---|---|---|---|---|---|---|
| 2018 | CHI | 1 | 0 | 1 | 0 | 0.0 | 0 | 0 | 3 | 27 | 9.0 | 19 | 0 | 1 | 35 | 35.0 | 35 | 0 | — | — | — | — | — | 5 | 62 | 0 |
| 2020 | CHI | 0 | 0 | Did not play | | | | | | | | | | | | | | | | | | | | | | |
| Career | | 1 | 0 | 1 | 0 | 0.0 | 0 | 0 | 3 | 27 | 9.0 | 19 | 0 | 1 | 35 | 35.0 | 35 | 0 | 0 | 0 | 0.0 | 0 | 0 | 5 | 62 | 0 |

=== College ===
| Season | Team | GP | Rushing | | | | Receiving | | | |
| Season | Team | GP | Att | Yds | Avg | TD | Rec | Yds | Avg | TD |
|---|---|---|---|---|---|---|---|---|---|---|
| 2013 | NC A&T | 11 | 195 | 1,148 | 5.9 | 8 | 11 | 152 | **13.8** | **1** |
| 2014 | NC A&T | 11 | 197 | 1,340 | 6.8 | 15 | 25 | 237 | 9.5 | **1** |
| 2015 | NC A&T | 12 | **264** | 1,543 | 5.8 | 15 | 25 | 217 | 8.7 | 0 |
| 2016 | NC A&T | 12 | 212 | **1,588** | **7.5** | **18** | **37** | **339** | 9.2 | **1** |
| Career | | 46 | 868 | 5,619 | 6.5 | 56 | 98 | 945 | 9.6 | 3 |

== Personal life ==
Cohen's mother Tilwanda Newell raised him and his brothers, twin Tyrell and younger brother Dante, in their youth. On May 9, 2021, Tyrell was found dead at a Duke Power substation in Raleigh, North Carolina. Dante died in a car accident in April 2022.

In December 2021, Cohen's and his girlfriend Jasmine Gray's son Carter was born. Cohen and Gray married in June 2026.

Cohen is the grandson of actor Obba Babatundé.
