= Elliot Jones =

American baseball player and coach

Biographical details
- Born: 34–35; Shreveport, Louisiana

Playing career
- 2012–2014: Southern
- Position: First baseman

Coaching career (HC unless noted)
- 2015–2017: Southern (H)
- 2018–2020: Grambling State (H/OF/C)
- 2021–2024: Alabama A&M

Head coaching record
- Overall: 51–126
- Tournaments: SWAC: 0–2

Elliot Jones is an American baseball coach and former first baseman, who recently was the head baseball coach of the Alabama A&M Bulldogs. He played college baseball at Southern for coach Roger Cador from 2012 to 2014.

== Playing career ==
Originally from Shreveport, Louisiana, Jones attended Huntington High School in Shreveport. While there, he was a two-sport athlete, quarterbacking the football team as well as playing baseball. On March 31, 2011, Jones committed to play college baseball at Southern University.

== Coaching career ==
Jones began his coaching career as an assistant at Southern. He was originally hired to be the head coach at Livonia High School, but he decided to accept a position as an assistant at Grambling State University instead.

On October 23, 2020, Jones was named the head coach of Alabama A&M.

On October 30, 2024, Jones announced he was leaving Alabama A&M after 4 seasons.

== Head coaching record ==
Record table
| Season | Team | Overall | Conference | Standing | Postseason |
|---|---|---|---|---|---|
Alabama A&M Bulldogs (Southwestern Athletic Conference) (2021–2024)
| 2021 | Alabama A&M | 9–20 | 9–13 | 3rd (East) | SWAC Tournament |
| 2022 | Alabama A&M | 14–35 | 10–20 | 5th (East) | |
| 2023 | Alabama A&M | 14–34 | 5–24 | 6th (East) | |
| 2024 | Alabama A&M | 14–37 | 9–20 | 5th (East) | |
| Alabama A&M: | | 51–126 | 33–77 | | |
| Total: | | 51–126 | | | |
National champion Postseason invitational champion Conference regular season champion Conference regular season and conference tournament champion Division regular season champion Division regular season and conference tournament champion Conference tournament champion
