= Chris Rowland =

American football player (born 1997)

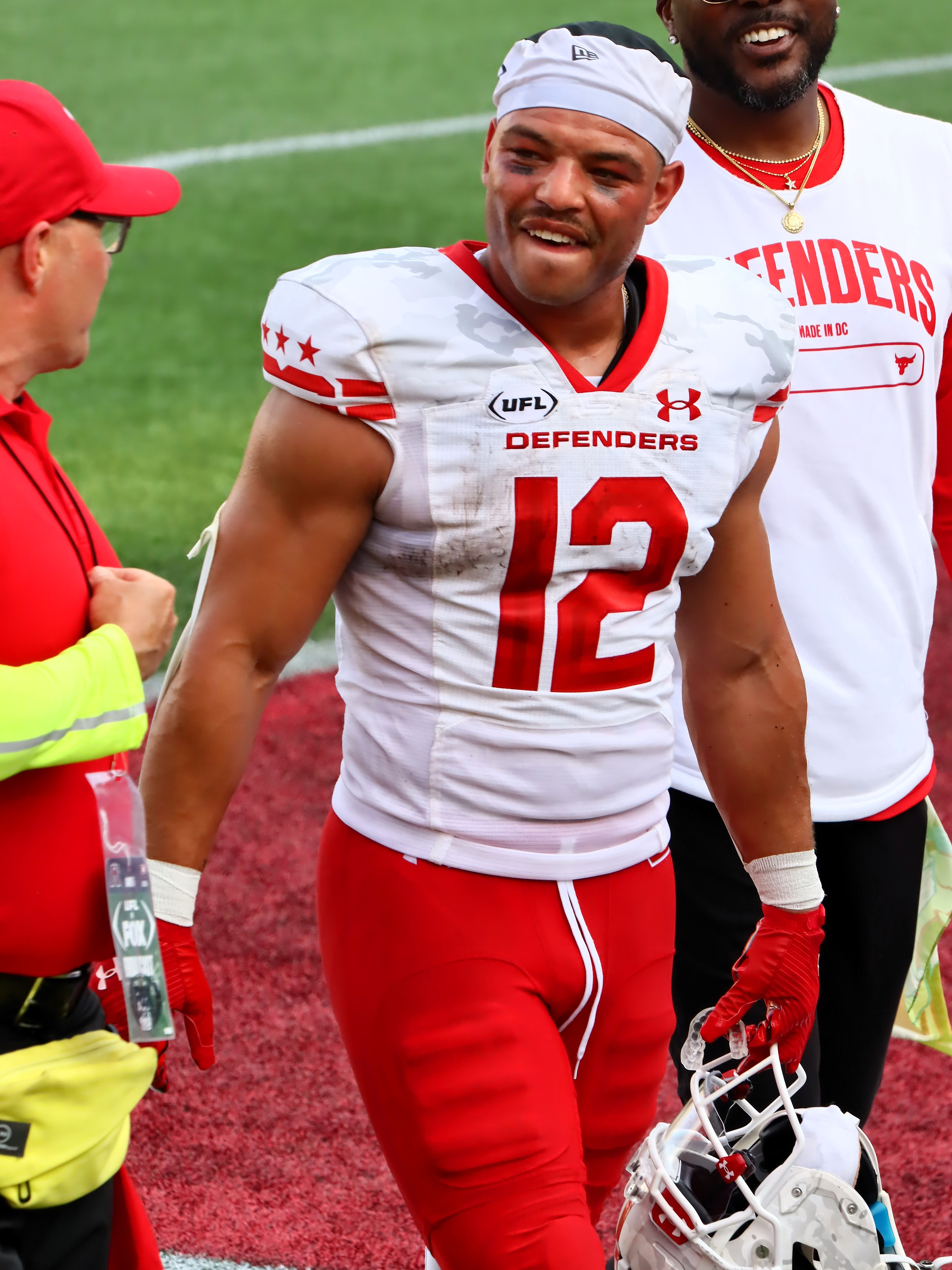
- Rowland with the DC Defenders in 2025

No. 12 – Orlando Storm
- Position: Wide receiver
- Roster status: Active

Personal information
- Born: December 19, 1997 (age 28); Nolensville, Tennessee, U.S.
- Listed height: 5 ft 8 in (1.73 m)
- Listed weight: 183 lb (83 kg)

Career information
- High school: Ravenwood (Brentwood, Tennessee)
- College: Tennessee State (2016–2019)
- NFL draft: 2020: undrafted

Career history
- Atlanta Falcons (2020–2021); Tennessee Titans (2021)*; Philadelphia Stars (2022–2023); DC Defenders (2024–2025); Orlando Storm (2026–present)
- * Offseason or practice squad member only

Awards and highlights
- UFL champion (2025); 3× All-UFL Team (2024–2026); UFL receptions leader (2026); Deacon Jones Trophy (2019); OVC Offensive Player of the Year (2019); First-team All-OVC (2019)

Career NFL statistics
- Return yards: 53
- Stats at Pro Football Reference

Chris Rowland (born December 19, 1997) is an American football wide receiver for the Orlando Storm of the United Football League (UFL). Rowland played college football for the Tennessee State Tigers. After college, he signed with the Atlanta Falcons as an undrafted free agent in 2020. Rowland also played for the Tennessee Titans and Philadelphia Stars.

== Early life ==
Rowland attended Ravenwood High School for high school. Rowland mostly played in the running back position at Ravenwood. After graduating in 2016, Rowland opted to play for Tennessee State.

== College career ==
In the 2019 college football season, Rowland was the only player in Division I to record a touchdown via a kick return, punt return, reception, and rush. He also broke the HBCU record for most receptions in a single season, a record which was previously set by Jerry Rice. For his efforts, he was named first-team all-conference as both a receiver and kick returner and received the Deacon Jones Trophy as the best player at an HBCU.

=== Statistics ===
Season	Team	Games		Receiving				Rushing				Kick returns				Punt returns			
Season	Team	GP	GS	Rec	Yds	Avg	TD	Att	Yds	Avg	TD	Ret	Yds	Avg	TD	Ret	Yds	Avg	TD
2016	Tennessee State	11	3	16	236	14.7	0	14	57	4.1	0	42	992	23.6	0	13	111	8.5	0
2017	Tennessee State	10	3	17	178	10.5	1	19	113	5.9	0	16	312	19.5	0	5	84	16.8	0
2018	Tennessee State	8	8	57	727	12.8	5	3	17	5.7	0	1	37	37.0	0	14	182	13.0	1
2019	Tennessee State	12	12	104	1,437	13.8	8	19	132	6.9	1	15	375	25.0	1	14	166	11.9	1
Career		41	26	194	2,578	13.3	14	55	319	5.8	1	74	1,716	23.2	1	46	543	11.8	1

== Professional career ==
Pre-draft measurables
Height	Weight	Arm length	Hand span	Wingspan
5 ft 6 3/8 in (1.69 m)	185 lb (84 kg)	28 1/4 in (0.72 m)	8 3/8 in (0.21 m)	5 ft 7 3/8 in (1.71 m)
All values from HBCU Combine

=== Atlanta Falcons ===
Rowland signed with the Atlanta Falcons as an undrafted free agent following the 2020 NFL draft on April 27, 2020. He was waived by Atlanta during final roster cuts on September 5, and was re–signed to the team's practice squad the next day. Rowland was elevated to the active roster on December 26 and January 2, 2021, for the team's Weeks 16 and 17 games against the Kansas City Chiefs and Tampa Bay Buccaneers, and reverted to the practice squad after each game. He signed a reserve/future contract with the Falcons on January 4.

On August 31, 2021, Rowland was waived by the Falcons as a part of final roster cuts.

=== Tennessee Titans ===
On November 10, 2021, Rowland was signed to the Tennessee Titans' practice squad. He was released by the Titans on November 23.

=== Philadelphia Stars ===
On March 10, 2022, Rowland was drafted by the Philadelphia Stars of the United States Football League. He was transferred to the team's inactive roster on April 22, with a shoulder injury. Rowland was transferred to the active roster on April 30.

Rowland was placed on injured reserve by the team on May 8, 2023. He re-signed with the team on October 1. Following the merger of the USFL with the XFL, the Stars folded.

=== DC Defenders ===
On January 15, 2024, Rowland was selected by the DC Defenders in the second round of the Super Draft portion of the 2024 UFL dispersal draft. He was named to the All-UFL team on June 5. Rowland re-signed with the Defenders on October 7.

On June 2, 2025, Rowland was named to the All-UFL team as a receiver and return specialist.

=== Orlando Storm ===
On January 13, 2026, Rowland was selected by the Orlando Storm in the 2026 UFL draft.

== Career statistics ==
=== NFL regular season ===
Year	League	Team	Games		Receiving					Rushing					Return yards					Fumbles	
Year	League	Team	GP	GS	Rec	Yds	Avg	Lng	TD	Att	Yds	Avg	Lng	TD	Att	Yds	Avg	Lng	TD	Fum	Lost
2020	NFL	ATL	2	0	0	0	0.0	0	0	0	0	0.0	0	0	2	53	26.5	43	0	0	0
Career			2	0	0	0	0.0	0	0	0	0	0.0	0	0	2	53	26.5	43	0	0	0

=== USFL/UFL career statistics ===
Legend
	League champion
	Led the league
**Bold**	Career high

==== Regular season ====
Year	Team	League	Games		Receiving					Rushing					Kick returns					Punt returns				
Year	Team	League	GP	GS	Rec	Yds	Avg	Lng	TD	Att	Yds	Avg	Lng	TD	Att	Yds	Avg	Lng	TD	Att	Yds	Avg	Lng	TD
2022	PHI	USFL	9	2	21	215	10.2	22	1	3	25	**8.3**	17	0	4	114	28.5	43	0	—	—	—	—	—
2023	PHI	USFL	3	1	9	83	9.2	24	1	4	20	5.0	17	0	13	322	24.8	46	0	—	—	—	—	—
2024	DC	UFL	**10**	3	20	262	**13.1**	46	3	4	29	7.3	13	0	**45**	**1,223**	27.2	**84**	**1**	**12**	**142**	**11.8**	**45**	0
2025	DC	UFL	**10**	**8**	42	522	12.4	**65T**	3	5	40	8.0	18	0	18	393	21.8	38	0	11	114	10.4	17	0
2026	ORL	UFL	**10**	7	**53**	**530**	10.0	62T	**5**	**7**	**55**	7.9	**28**	0	13	377	**29.0**	**66**	0	12	132	11.0	19	0
Career			42	21	145	1,612	11.1	65	13	23	169	7.3	28	0	93	2,429	26.1	84	1	35	388	11.1	45	0

==== USFL/UFL postseason ====
Year	Team	League	Games		Receiving					Rushing					Kick returns					Punt returns				
Year	Team	League	GP	GS	Rec	Yds	Avg	Lng	TD	Att	Yds	Avg	Lng	TD	Att	Yds	Avg	Lng	TD	Att	Yds	Avg	Lng	TD
2022	PHI	USFL	2	0	5	98	19.6	43	1	5	35	7.0	19	0	2	59	29.5	32	0	—	—	—	—	—
2025	DC	UFL	2	2	10	87	8.7	32	0	6	53	8.8	19	1	—	—	—	—	—	—	—	—	—	—
Career			4	2	15	185	12.3	43	1	11	88	8.0	19	1	2	59	29.5	32	0	0	0	0	0	0
