= Hialeah-Miami Lakes Senior High School =

Public high school in Hialeah, Florida, USA

Hialeah-Miami-Lakes Senior High School
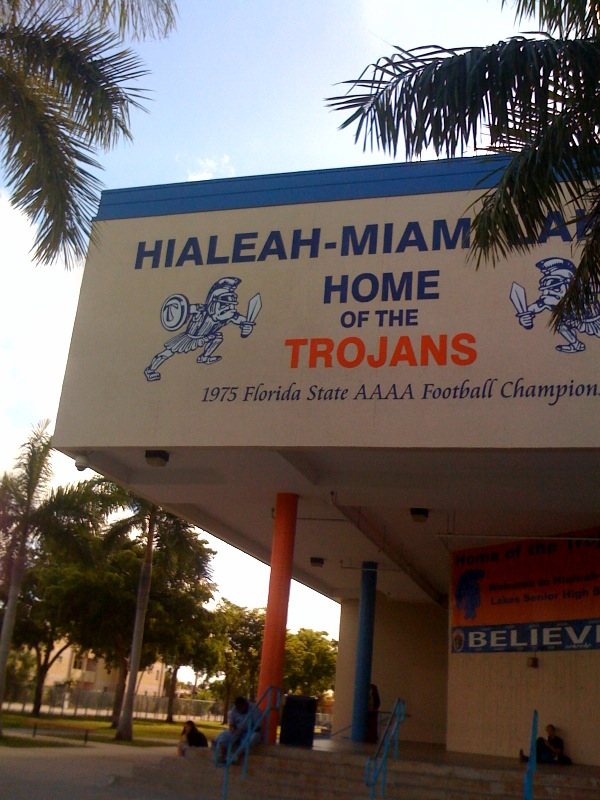

Location
- 7977 West 12th Avenue; Hialeah, Florida 33014; United States; 25.894983°N 80.307901°W

Information
- Type: Public high school
- Motto: Latin: Labor Omnia Vincet (Work Conquers All)
- Established: September 1971
- School district: Miami-Dade County Public Schools
- Principal: Juan Ramirez
- Teaching staff: 62.00 FTEs
- Grades: 9–12
- Gender: Co-educational
- Enrollment: 1,353 (2023-2024)
- Average class size: 30
- Student to teacher ratio: 21.82
- Schedule: 7:20 AM to 2:20 PM
- Hours in school day: 7
- Campus: Suburban
- Colors: Royal blue True orange White
- Mascot: Trojan
- Nickname: HML
- Yearbook: Aeneid
- Website: hmltrojans.org

Hialeah-Miami Lakes Senior High School, locally referred to as HML, is a public high school operated by Miami-Dade County Public Schools, located at 7977 West 12th Avenue in Hialeah, Florida, United States, on the boundary with the town of Miami Lakes. Its principal is Juan Ramirez.

As of the 2024–25 school year, the school had an enrollment of 1,311 students and 95.0 classroom teachers (on an FTE basis), for a student–teacher ratio of 18.1:1. There were 1,278 students (74.5% of enrollment) eligible for free lunch and 113 (6.6% of students) eligible for reduced-cost lunch.

== History ==
=== Construction ===
Hialeah-Miami Lakes Senior High opened its doors in 1971; the school was built to serve the newly formed community of Miami Lakes, Florida as well asparts of the cities of Opa-Locka and Hialeah, Florida. It is one of five high schools serving the densely populated Miami suburb of Hialeah, Florida.

== Magnets ==
Hialeah-Miami Lakes is a Magnet high school, currently offering 3 magnets: Legal Studies, SpaceHUB@Hialeah-Miami Lakes, and Digital Media Design & Entrepreneurship.

=== Legal Studies Magnet ===
The Legal Studies Magnet, currently overseen by Ms. Rukayat Adebisi, is a prominent program at Hialeah-Miami Lakes. Its students participate in Mock Trial, Project Citizen, and Model UN, in which the team has won best Model UN team in Miami-Dade County in 2022, 2023, 2024, and 2025. In 2025, a state-of-the-art courtroom was unveiled and opened for the Legal Studies program.

=== SpaceHUB@Hialeah-Miami Lakes ===
In 2024, construction began to renovate and reopen the planetarium located in the Media Center of the school, and in 2025, HML became the first high school in Miami-Dade County to become a SpaceHUB Aerospace Mega-Magnet High School. The programs offered as part of SpaceHUB include Aerospace Applied Engineering, Robotics, Coding, Electrical Systems, and Advanced Aerospace Science & Design.

=== Digital Media Design and Entrepreneurship ===
The Digital Media Technology & Entrepreneurship Academy aims to assist students interested in business, finance, marketing, and digital media. Students have access and instruction on utilizing programs such as Dreamweaver, Premier Plus and coding.

== Demographics ==
Hialeah-Miami Lakes is 70% Hispanic (of any race), 21% Black, 6% White non-Hispanic, and 3% Asian.

=== Achievements ===
Hialeah-Miami Lakes Senior participates in the Florida High School Mock Trial Competition and the National High School Mock Trial Competition. Hialeah-Miami Lakes Senior received Miami-Dade County Championships in 1991, 1992, 1993, 1994 and placed 2nd in 1995. The school received Florida State Championships in 1991, 1992, 1993, and placed 2nd in 1994. Hialeah-Miami Lakes Senior, under the instruction of Walter Gishler and Anthony DeFillippo, and assistance from attorney Julie Waldman Esq, received National High School Mock Trial Honors placing 7th in 1991, 5th in 1993 and National Champions in 1992.

In 2006–2007, the Hialeah-Miami Lakes Theatre/Drama Department earned straight superior ratings at the Southeastern Theatre Conference. Representing not only their school but M-DCPS and the entire state of Florida as well, they earned straight superior ratings for the production of From the Mississippi Delta.

=== Grades ===
Hialeah-Miami Lakes improved from a D in 2011, to a B in 2012, and further improved to an A in 2013. Hialeah-Miami Lakes has dropped to a B twice and downgraded into C in 2015-16. They maintained a B grade from 2016–2017 school year to 2024-25 school year. .

School Year	Grade
1998-99	D
1999-00	D
2000-01	C
2001-02	D
2002-03	C
2003-04	D
2004-05	D
2005-06	C
2006-07	F
2007-08	D
2008-09	D
2009-10	C
2010-11	D
2011-12	B
2012-13	A
2013-14	B
2014-15	B
2015-16	C
2016-17	B
2017-18	B
2018-19	B
2021-22	B
2022-23	B
2023-24	B
2024-25	B
2025-26	C

=== Academics ===
Hialeah-Miami Lakes offers multiple Advanced Placement and Dual enrollment courses in its curriculum. The school offers Dual Enrollment courses with Miami-Dade College, Florida International University, and multiple Ivy Leagues through the EdEquity program. The AP courses offered for the 2024-2025 school year are:

1. Biology
2. Chemistry
3. Calculus (AB & BC)
4. Precalculus
5. Spanish Language
6. Spanish Literature
7. Human Geography
8. United States Government & Politics
9. Art History
10. Capstone (Seminar and Research)

=== Extracurriculars ===
Hialeah-Miami Lakes offers over 30 clubs and organizations, including Army JROTC, Student Government, Marching Band, Color Guard, Mental Health Club, 5,000 Role Models, Big Brothers Big Sisters, Justice Society, Best Buddies, Sapphires Dance Troupe, Sorrota, Drama, Police Explorers, Foodies Club, Environmental Club, Speech and Debate, ESports, CodeHer, Key Club, HIP (Health Information Project), Model UN, FEA (Future Educators of America, Book Club, Magnet Ambassadors, and Yearbook.

The school also dons multiple honors societies, including National Honors Society, Science National Honors Society, Spanish National Honors Society, Mu Alpha Theta (mathematics honors society), and Tri-M (music honors society.)

== Athletics ==
Hialeah-Miami Lakes High School has won multiple Florida state sports championships, including the 1972 and 1973 undefeated Boys Waterpolo State Champions and the 1972 and 1973 undefeated Girls Waterpolo State Champions, the 1975 football state championship, four state championships in baseball (1977, 1979, 1980, and 1985), one in boys' soccer (1978), one in boys' golf (1978), one in boys' gymnastics (1978), one in boys' track (1984), one in boys' basketball (1986), and one in girls' soccer (1993), as well as a national baseball championship in 1985. Hialeah-Miami Lakes High was also awarded the Miami Herald All Sport Award for seven seasons (1977–78, 1979–80, 1980–81, 1982–83, 1983–84, 1984–85, and 1989–90) as well as the Miami Herald Major Sport Award (1977–78 and 1978–79).

Hialeah-Miami Lakes High shares a rivalry with Hialeah High and a less notable one with Barbara Goleman Senior High.

== Feeder patterns ==
The following elementary schools feed into Hialeah-Miami Lakes:

- M. A. Milam Elementary
- Bunche Park Elementary
- John G. Dupuis Elementary
- Golden Glades Elementary
- Miami Lakes Elementary
- North Twin Lakes Elementary
- Nathan B. Young Elementary
- Palm Lakes Elementary
- Rainbow Park Elementary
- Twin Lakes Elementary

The following middle schools feed into Hialeah-Miami Lakes:

- Miami Lakes Middle
- North Dade Middle
- Miami Lakes K-8 Center
- M.A. Milam K-8 Center
- Palm Springs Middle

== Notable alumni ==
- Armando Allen (born 1989, class of 2007), NFL running back for the Chicago Bears
- Cristian Amigo, composer and guitarist
- Frank Artiles (born 1973), Florida House of Representatives for District 119 in Florida
- Devin Bush (born 1973), former NFL free safety for the Atlanta Falcons (1995–1998), the St. Louis Rams (1999–2000) and the Cleveland Browns (2001–2002)
- Maria Canals-Barrera (born 1966), actress
- Elizabeth Caballero, international opera singer, class of 1993
- Rene Capo (1961-2009), United States Olympic representative as a judoka
- Johndale Carty (born 1977), former NFL defensive back
- Samuel Charles (born 1985), football wide receiver for the Spokane Empire
- Chris Corchiani (born 1968, class of 1987), NBA guard for Orlando Magic after being picked in the second round of the 1991 NBA draft from North Carolina State University and later on the Boston Celtics and Washington Bullets
- Vincent D'Onofrio (born 1959), actor and producer, known for stage, film and television work; best known for his role as Detective Robert Goren in Law & Order: Criminal Intent and Wilson Fisk in Daredevil
- Rohan Davey (born 1978), NFL quarterback for the New England Patriots (2002–2004) and Arizona Cardinals (2005), also helped lead the win of the NFL Europe World Bowl for the Berlin Thunder
- Alberto Fernandez (born 1958), State Department official, US ambassador to Equatorial Guinea
- Wifredo A. Ferrer (born 1966), United States Attorney for the Southern District of Florida
- Jamari Lattimore (born 1988), NFL linebacker for the Green Bay Packers
- Thad Lewis (born 1987, class of 2006), NFL quarterback
- Manny Lora (born 1991, class of 2008), baseball coach
- Joe Menendez (born 1969, class of 1987), television director
- José R. Oliva (born 1973, class of 1991), Florida House of Representatives for District 110 and CEO of Oliva cigars
- Javier Ortiz (outfielder) (born 1963, class of 1981), former baseball player for the Houston Astros
- Julio Robaina (born 1965), mayor of Hialeah, Florida, 2005–2011
- Edel Rodriguez (born 1971), Time magazine art director, illustrator, children's book author
- Carlos Serrao, photographer
- Sara Sidner, journalist
- Michael Timpson (born 1967, class of 1985), NFL wide receiver for the New England Patriots for six seasons (1989–1994)
- Rocco Valdes (born 1980), record executive and music producer
