= Bunn High School =

American public secondary school in North Carolina

Location
- 29 Bunn Elementary School Road; Bunn, North Carolina 27508; United States
- Coordinates: 35°57′21″N 78°14′57″W

Information
- Type: Public
- Oversight: Franklin County Schools
- CEEB code: 340475
- Principal: Tyler Morris
- Teaching staff: 48.94 (FTE)
- Enrollment: 817 (2024-2025)
- Student to teacher ratio: 16.68
- Colors: Green and gold
- Athletics conference: Northern Carolina Conference
- Mascot: Wildcat
- Website: bhs.fcschools.net

Bunn High School is a public secondary school located in the town of Bunn, North Carolina, United States.

J. Melville Broughton was principal of the school many years before he became governor of the state.

== Student demographics ==
838 Students Enrolled

- 45% White
- 29% Hispanic
- 20% Black
- 5% Two or More Races
- 0.8% Asian
- 0.2% American Indian

== Athletics ==
The school colors are green and gold, and the mascot is the wildcat.

The sports are:

- Baseball
- Basketball
- Cheerleading
- Cross country
- Football
- Color Guard / Dance
- Golf
- Soccer
- Softball
- Tennis
- Track and field
- Volleyball
- Wrestling
- Swimming

== Notable alumni ==
- Tarik Cohen – running back for New York Jets
- Davanta Hinton/Kid Pheno – rapper
- Troy Wheless (Class of 1999) – standout college basketball player for the College of Charleston
- Cassandra Deck-Brown – Chief of Police Raleigh, North Carolina, Raleigh's first African American woman to hold that position.
