= Louis Crews Stadium =

Multi-purpose stadium in Normal, Alabama

- "Bulldog Stadium"
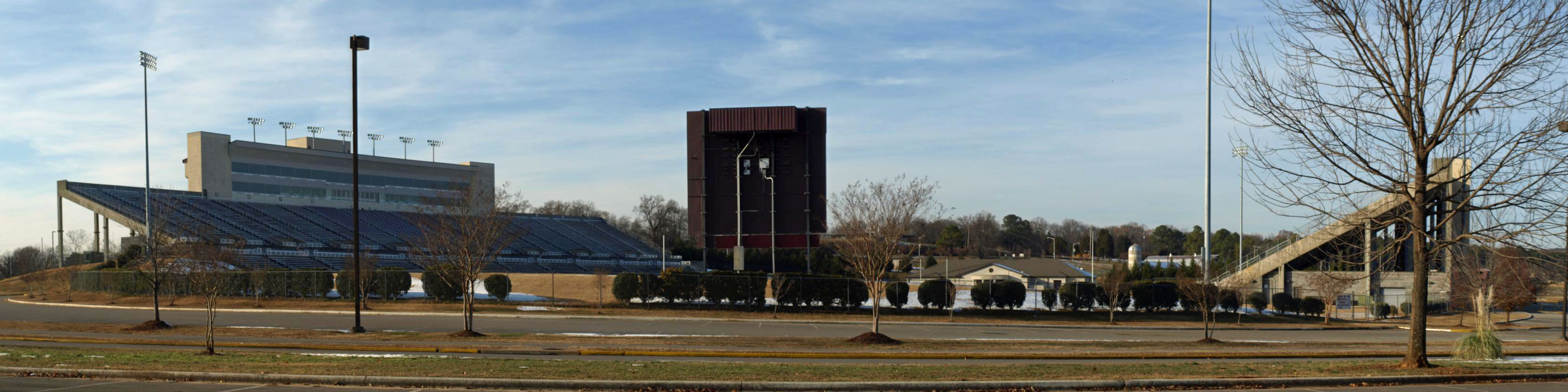
- Interactive map of Louis Crews Stadium
- Location: Normal, Alabama
- Coordinates: 34°47′1.22″N 86°34′42.4″W
- Owner: Alabama A&M University
- Operator: Alabama A&M University
- Capacity: 21,000
- Surface: FieldTurf

Construction
- Groundbreaking: 1996
- Opened: 1996
- Cost: $10 million USD

Tenant
- Alabama A&M Bulldogs (NCAA) (1996–Present)

Louis Crews Stadium is a 21,000-seat multi-purpose stadium located on the campus of Alabama A&M University in Normal, Alabama. The stadium opened in 1996 and is home to the Alabama A&M football team. It was named in honor of Louis Crews, who served as the team's head coach from 1960 to 1975.

Built at a price of $10 million, Louis Crews Stadium has a current capacity of 21,000, and is the tenth largest stadium in Alabama. The home-side grandstands have a capacity of 14,000 and the visitors' side holds 7,000.

The stadium features a two-level press box which can accommodate up to 30 sportswriters. In addition, there are 19 skyboxes that can seat 16 to 50 people each. An all-weather, 8-lane running track surrounds the football playing surface. The track portion of the facility contains a high jump competition area, and multi-directional long/triple jump and pole vault runways. The stadium hosted the Southwestern Athletic Conference (SWAC) Outdoor Track & Field Championships in 2015, 2016, and 2017, and several AAU Track Meets during the summer months.

FieldTurf was originally installed in October 2012, and replaced with an all new state of the art FieldTurf surface in May 2023, one uses coconut husks instead of the traditional rubber pellets, which cools field temperatures.

== Notable games ==
- The first game played in Louis Crews was a 20–17 loss to Clark Atlanta University. This marked the first game played on campus since 1971.
- The first win in the stadium was a 36–22 victory over Miles College in 1996.
- The largest crowd in the history of Louis Crews Stadium occurred in 2021, when 21,835 people attended Alabama A&M's homecoming game.

== See also ==
- List of NCAA Division I FCS football stadiums
