= Aqeel Glass =

American football player (born 1999)

No. 10
- Position: Quarterback

Personal information
- Born: July 7, 1999 (age 27); St. Louis, Missouri, U.S.
- Listed height: 6 ft 5 in (1.96 m)
- Listed weight: 215 lb (98 kg)

Career information
- High school: Lutheran North (St. Louis)
- College: Alabama A&M (2017−2021)
- NFL draft: 2022: undrafted

Career history
- New Orleans Breakers (2023)

Awards and highlights
- 2× Deacon Jones Trophy (2020, 2021); 2× SWAC Offensive Player of the Year (2020, 2021); 2× First-team All-SWAC (2020, 2021); 2× Second-team All-SWAC (2018, 2019)

Aqeel Glass (born July 7, 1999) is an American former football quarterback. He played college football for the Alabama A&M Bulldogs.

== Early life ==
Glass grew up in St. Louis, Missouri and attended Lutheran High School North. As a senior, he completed 157 of 280 passes for 2,811 yards and 32 touchdowns. Glass initially committed to play college football at Florida International University, but later flipped his commitment to Alabama A&M after a change in the coaching staff.

== College career ==
Glass was named the Bulldogs' starting quarterback going into his freshman season. He completed 194 of 346 passes for 2,421 yards with 20 touchdowns and nine interceptions in his sophomore season. As a junior, Glass completed 273 of 446 passes for a school record 3,600 yards and 32 touchdowns against 11 interceptions. Following the SWAC's postponement of the 2020 football season to spring 2021, Glass played in four games and passed for 1,355 yards, 16 touchdowns and four interceptions as a senior and was awarded the Deacon Jones Trophy as the nation's top HBCU player.

Glass decided to utilize the extra year of eligibility granted to college athletes who played in the 2020 season due to the COVID-19 pandemic and return to Alabama A&M for a fifth season. He passed for 3,568 yards with 36 touchdowns and seven interceptions and received the Deacon Jones Trophy for a second straight season. Following the conclusion of his collegiate career, Glass played in the 2022 NFLPA Collegiate Bowl and the inaugural HBCU Legacy Bowl.

== Professional career ==
On December 13, 2022, Glass signed with the New Orleans Breakers of the United States Football League (USFL). The Breakers folded when the XFL and USFL merged to create the United Football League (UFL).
