= Jill Sigman =

Choreographer, dancer, teacher and company director from Brooklyn

Jill Sigman is a choreographer, dancer, teacher and company director from Brooklyn. She received her PhD in Philosophy from Princeton University in 1998, as well as formed her company jill sigman/thinkdance. Sigman is known for her audience participation and use of installations in her performance pieces.

== Background ==
Sigman was born in Brooklyn and trained in classical ballet at both the Joffrey Ballet and the Ballet Center of Brooklyn. She began training in modern while studying for her BA at Princeton University. She is well known for both her solo performances, as well as her larger group pieces choreographed for her company. Sigman's pieces incorporate opinions and actions from the audience that she and her dancers use in the performances. They often perform pieces related to socially relevant topics in alternative spaces.

== List of choreographed works ==
- Embers - solo, 1997
- Mother's Tongue/I Love You - duet, 1997
- Still Life - group, 1997
- Athena, Goddess of Wisdom - solo, 2000
- Warbody - jill sigman/thinkdance, 2002
- Vision Begins - solo, 2002
- I Cut the Rug In My Day - jill sigman/thinkdance, 2003
- Flood Light - 2003
- Pulling the Wool: An American Landscape of Truth and Deception - jill sigman/thinkdance, 2004
- Paradise and Its Dis-Ease - jill sigman/thinkdance, 2008
- ZsaZsaLand - jill sigman/thinkdance, 2009
- Our Lady of Detritus - jill sigman/thinkdance, 2009
- The Hut Project - jill sigman/thinkdance, 2009–present
- Nat. Mur: 5 Rites - jill sigman/thinkdance, 2010
- Fowl Play: Some Dances About Civilization - solo, 2011
- (Perma)Culture - jill sigman/thinkdance, 2014
- Weed Heart - jill sigman/thinkdance, 2016

== Teaching ==
- Associate Professor, Eugene Lang College The New School for Liberal Arts, 2008
- Adjunct Instructor, New York University, 2017 to present

== Fellowships and residencies ==
- Swarthmore Project Residency, Swarthmore College, 2000
- Kri Foundation Invited Guest Residency, New Delhi, India, 2005
- Maggie Allesee National Center for Choreography at Florida State University, 2005
- Movement Research Artist in Residence, 2005
- EMPAC Residency, 2010
- Wesleyan University Creative Campus Fellow, 2012 - 2016
- Green Choreographer Research Residency, 2013
- Baryshnikov Arts Center Artist Residency, 2013
- CUNY Dance Initiative Residency, 2016
- Rauschenberg Residency, 2016
- NYFA Fellowship in Architecture/Environmental Structures/Design, 2016
