= Deacon Jones Trophy =

Annual award for best HBCU college football player

- Awarded for: Black college football player of the year
- Country: United States
- Presented by: Black College Football Hall of Fame

History
- First award: 2016
- Most recent: Virginia Union running back Curtis Allen
- Website: www.blackcollegefootballhof.org

The Deacon Jones Trophy is an annual player of the year award given to the most outstanding all-around collegiate American football player of the year among teams from historically black colleges and universities (HBCUs). The trophy was named in honor of National Football League (NFL) player Deacon Jones, who played for South Carolina State and Mississippi Valley State University. Jones, who was selected in the 14th round of the 1961 NFL draft by the Los Angeles Rams, would go on to become a standout defensive end accumulating 173½ sacks over his career, earning unanimous All-NFL honors for 6 consecutive years from 1965 through 1970 and 8 Pro Bowl selections. Jones also holds the distinctions of being an inaugural Black College Football Hall of Fame inductee (2010) and a member of the Pro Football Hall of Fame.

== Winners ==
Year	Winner	Position	Team	Ref
2016	Tarik Cohen	Running back	North Carolina A&T	
2017	Amir Hall	Quarterback	Bowie State	
2018	Amir Hall (2)	Quarterback	Bowie State (2)	
2019	Chris Rowland	Wide receiver	Tennessee State	
2020	Aqeel Glass	Quarterback	Alabama A&M	
2021	Aqeel Glass (2)	Quarterback	Alabama A&M (2)	
2022	Shedeur Sanders	Quarterback	Jackson State	
2023	Jeremy Moussa	Quarterback	Florida A&M	
2023	Davius Richard	Quarterback	North Carolina Central	
2024	Jada Byers	Running back	Virginia Union	
2025	Curtis Allen	Running back	Virginia Union	
