= Alabama A&M Bulldogs baseball =

Alabama A&M Bulldogs
- 2026 Alabama A&M Bulldogs baseball
- University: Alabama A&M University
- Athletic director: Bryan Hicks
- Head coach: Louis Whitlow
- Conference: SWAC; East Division
- Location: Huntsville, Alabama
- Home stadium: Bulldog Field
- Nickname: Bulldogs
- Colors: Maroon and white

Conference regular season champions
- SIAC: 1993

The Alabama A&M Bulldogs baseball team is the varsity intercollegiate baseball program of Alabama A&M University in Huntsville, Alabama, United States. The program's first season is unknown, and it has been a member of the NCAA Division I Southwestern Athletic Conference since the start of the 1999 season. Its home venue is Bulldog Field, located on Alabama A&M's campus. Louis Whitlow is the team's interim head coach for the 2025 season. The program has yet to appear in the NCAA Tournament. It has won zero conference tournament championships and 0 regular season conference titles. As of the start of the 2018 Major League Baseball season, 1 former Bulldogs have appeared in Major League Baseball.

== History ==
=== Conference affiliations ===
- Southern Intercollegiate Athletic Conference (1947–1998)
- Southwestern Athletic Conference (1999–present)

== Bulldog Field ==
The venue has a capacity of 500 spectators. The field opened in 1997. It also features dugouts, batting cages, and grandstand seating.

== Head coaches ==
Alabama A&M's longest tenured head coach was Thomas Wesley, who has coached the team from 1991 to 2006.

Year(s)	Coach	Seasons	W-L-T	Pct
1969	Unknown	1	8–9–1	.472
1970	Louis Crews	1	12–4	.750
1975	Brawnski Towns	1	3–18	.143
1979–1981	Press Parham	3	36–49	.424
1984	Alvin Rauls	1	14–23–1	.382
1985	Eddie Sherrod	1	5–27	.156
1991–2006	Thomas Wesley	16	238–364–2	.396
2007–2009	Jay Martin	3	32–87–1	.271
2010	Demetrius Mitchell	1	10–4	.714
2010	Kevin Belliard	1	7–27	.206
2011	Ed McCann	1	10–38	.208
2012–2013	Michael Thompkins	2	16–83	.162
2014–2018	Mitch Hill	5	84–182	.316
2019–2020	Manny Lora	2	19-49	.279
2021–2024	Elliot Jones	4	51–126	.288
2025–present	Louis Whitlow	1	11–39	.220
Totals	15 coaches	44	556–1080–5	.340

== Notable former players ==
Below is a list of notable former Bulldogs and the seasons in which they played for Alabama A&M.

- Cleon Jones (1968)

== See also ==
- List of NCAA Division I baseball programs
