= Mitch Hill =

American college baseball coach

Current position
- Title: Head coach
- Team: UT Southern
- Conference: Mid-South
- Record: 152–274

Biographical details
- Born: Florence, Alabama

Playing career
- 2003–2007: North Alabama
- Position: Pitcher

Coaching career (HC unless noted)
- 2008–2010: North Alabama (Asst.)
- 2011: Bevill State (asst.)
- 2012: Motlow State (asst.)
- 2013: Alabama A&M (asst.)
- 2014–2018: Alabama A&M
- 2019–present: Martin Methodist College

Head coaching record
- Overall: 127–210
- Tournaments: SWAC: 1–8; SSAC: 0–2

Mitch Hill in an American college baseball coach, currently serving as head coach of the UT Southern RedHawks program. He was named the head coach of the Alabama A&M Bulldogs baseball program that position prior to the 2014 season.

Hill was a pitcher for North Alabama. He then served as a graduate assistant with the Lions for three years, handling recruiting and administrative duties. After three years in that position, he then spent a single year each assisting at Bevill State and Motlow State. In his year at Bevill State, he assembled a top three Alabama recruiting class, only to see the athletic program discontinued, leaving athletes in the lurch. In 2013, he moved to Alabama A&M as an assistant, again responsible for recruiting. Hill succeeded Michael Tompkins in July 2013.

On June 25, 2018, Hill resigned from his position at Alabama A&M and accepted the head coaching job at Martin Methodist College.

== Head coaching record ==
Below is a table of Hill's yearly records as an NCAA head baseball coach.

Record table
Season	Team	Overall	Conference	Standing	Postseason
Alabama A&M Bulldogs (Southwestern Athletic Conference) (2014–2018)
2014	Alabama A&M	21–32	12–9	2nd (East)	SWAC Tournament
2015	Alabama A&M	26–30	16–8	2nd (East)	SWAC Tournament
2016	Alabama A&M	13–38	8–13	3rd (East)	SWAC Tournament
2017	Alabama A&M	12–45	9–15	3rd (East)	SWAC Tournament
2018	Alabama A&M	12–37	9–15	3rd (East)	Ineligible
Alabama A&M:		84–182	54–60		
Martin Methodist Red Hawks (Southern States Athletic Conference) (2019–present)
2019	Martin Methodist	28–25	14–12	7th	
2020	Martin Methodist	15–3	4–2		Season canceled due to COVID-19
Martin Methodist:		43–28	18–14		
Total:		127–210			
National champion Postseason invitational champion Conference regular season champion Conference regular season and conference tournament champion Division regular season champion Division regular season and conference tournament champion Conference tournament champion
