= Decatur Negro High School =

Location
- 809 Church Street NE; Decatur, Alabama 35601; United States; 34.606839°N 86.976065°W

Information
- Type: Public high school
- Established: 1921
- Closed: 1966
- Grades: 9–12

Alabama Register of Landmarks and Heritage
- Official name: Carver School
- Designated: March 29, 2012

Decatur Negro High School was a public high school in Decatur, Alabama, United States. It was a segregated school that was established in 1921 and closed in 1966 when the public schools were integrated. It was the only school for black children in Morgan County and as of 1992, the facility is in use as Horizon School.

== History ==
Decatur Negro High School was the only school for black children in Morgan County, Alabama. It was opened by 1921, and in 1927, a new brick building was built on the highest point on Church Street. Over the years, it was known as George Washington Carver School, Gibbs Street School, East Decatur Colored School and Albany Negro School. After closing due to integration in 1966, the building was used as a storage facility until 1974 when it was reopened as a developmental center. In 1992, the facility became Horizon School, which is still in use as of 1992. It was placed on the Alabama Register of Landmarks and Heritage in March 2012.
