= Magic City Classic =

Annual American football game in Alabama

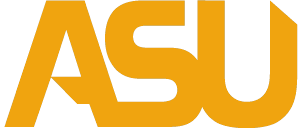
- Alabama A&M Bulldogs Alabama State Hornets
- First meeting: October 31, 1924; Alabama State 30, Alabama A&M 0
- Latest meeting: October 31, 2026; Alabama A&M 31, Alabama State 28
- Next meeting: October 30, 2027
- Stadiums: Legion Field
- Trophy: Magic City Classic Trophy

Statistics
- Total meetings: 91
- All-time series: Alabama A&M leads, 45–43–3
- Largest victory: Alabama State, 56–0 (1931)
- Current win streak: Alabama A&M, 1 (2026–present)

Locations of Alabama A&M and Alabama State

The Magic City Classic is an annual American football "classic" that features Alabama A&M University and Alabama State University, the two largest historically black universities in the state. It is played at Legion Field in Birmingham, which is nicknamed the "Magic City". The classic has become one of the highest attended Division I FCS (formerly Division I-AA) games in the nation and the largest event in Birmingham, with a nearly $25 million economic impact on the area. The stadium attendance averages over 60,000 annually.

The first game between the two schools was played in 1924. It has been an uninterrupted, annual tradition since 1945 and has been played at Legion Field since 1940.

The classic is the largest HBCU event in the nation attracting nearly 200,000 participants. The Alabama A&M Bulldogs narrowly lead the series with a record of 45–43–3 all-time (as of 2026).

== Other activities ==
Many festivities are held in conjunction with the game, including a pep rally, comedy show, scholarship breakfast, concert/festival, soirees, tailgating, block parties, alumni gatherings, 2-hour parade, and a popular "Battle of the Bands" between AAMU's Marching Maroon and White Band and ASU's Mighty Marching Hornets. Festivities begin the week of Saturday's game.

In recent years, the classic has attracted numerous African-American celebrities, public figures, and elected officials to Birmingham.

After the 2026 game, a shooting broke out outside Legion Field near Graymont Avenue, where vendors had set up. One person was killed and eight others were wounded; one of the wounded was initially listed in critical condition. Police detained one person for questioning and recovered multiple firearms from the scene. Postgame tailgating was suspended and the area around the stadium was cleared. Birmingham Mayor Randall Woodfin said the community was "hurt, shaken and rightfully angry," and vowed that "justice will be served."

== History ==
Alabama A&M victories	Alabama State victories	Tie games	Forfeit

No.	Date	Winner	Score
1	Unknown 1924	Alabama State	30–0
2	Unknown 1925	Alabama State	7–0
3	Unknown 1929	Alabama State	32–0
4	Unknown 1930	Alabama State	46–6
5	Unknown 1931	Alabama State	56–0
6	Unknown 1932	Alabama State	18–0
7	Unknown 1940	Alabama State	24–6
8	Unknown 1941	Alabama State	21–13
9	Unknown 1942	Alabama A&M	20–6
10	Unknown 1945	Alabama State	20–7
11	Unknown 1946	Alabama State	15–14
12	Unknown 1947	Alabama State	12–6
13	Unknown 1948	Alabama A&M	14–8
14	Unknown 1949	Tie	13–13
15	Unknown 1950	Alabama State	16–12
16	Unknown 1951	Alabama A&M	27–6
17	Unknown 1952	Alabama A&M	38–13
18	Unknown 1953	Alabama A&M	13–7
19	Unknown 1954	Alabama State	23–7
20	Unknown 1955	Alabama A&M	13–6
21	Unknown 1956	Tie	0–0
22	Unknown 1957	Alabama State	13–7
23	Unknown 1958	Alabama State	20–8
24	Unknown 1959	Alabama State	22–0
25	Unknown 1960	Alabama A&M	22–20
26	Unknown 1961	Alabama A&M	32–12
27	Unknown 1962	Alabama A&M	54–6
28	Unknown 1963	Alabama A&M	32–14
29	Unknown 1964	Alabama A&M	30–0
30	Unknown 1965	Alabama A&M	34–0
31	Unknown 1966	Alabama A&M	36–19
32	Unknown 1967	Alabama State	13–7
33	Unknown 1968	Alabama State	27–21
34	Unknown 1969	Alabama State	26–6
35	Unknown 1970	Alabama A&M	26–18
36	Unknown 1971	Alabama State	12–6
37	Unknown 1972	Alabama A&M	8–7
38	Unknown 1973	Alabama A&M	10–7
39	Unknown 1974	Alabama A&M	14–7
40	Unknown 1975	Alabama A&M	29–22
41	Unknown 1976	Alabama A&M	17–15
42	Unknown 1977	Alabama State	14–7
43	Unknown 1978	Alabama A&M	22–7
44	Unknown 1979	Alabama State	17–14
45	Unknown 1980	Alabama State	20–17
46	Unknown 1981	Alabama A&M	13–3
47	October 30, 1982	Tie	13–13

No.	Date	Winner	Score
48	October 29, 1983	Alabama A&M	27–14
49	October 27, 1984	Alabama A&M	28–12
50	November 2, 1985	Alabama A&M	7–6
51	November 1, 1986	Alabama A&M	20–10
52	October 31, 1987	Alabama State	17–14
53	October 29, 1988	Alabama State	7–0
54	October 28, 1989	Alabama A&M	17–10
55	October 27, 1990	Alabama State	24–20
56	November 2, 1991	Alabama State	59–13
57	October 31, 1992	Alabama State	14–11
58	October 30, 1993	Alabama State	7–0
59	October 29, 1994	Alabama State	26–0
60	October 28, 1995	Alabama State	37–20
61	October 26, 1996	Alabama A&M	20–3
62	October 25, 1997	Alabama State	20–13
63	October 31, 1998	Alabama State	34–28
64	October 30, 1999	Alabama A&M	15–10
65	October 28, 2000	Alabama A&M	34–27
66	October 27, 2001	Alabama State^{†}	35–0
67	October 26, 2002	Alabama A&M	23–20
68	October 25, 2003	Alabama A&M	20–17
69	October 30, 2004	Alabama State	24–20
70	October 29, 2005	Alabama A&M	31–28
71	October 28, 2006	Alabama A&M	21–13
72	October 27, 2007	Alabama A&M	13–9
73	October 24, 2008	Alabama A&M	17–16
74	October 31, 2009	Alabama A&M	21–7
75	October 30, 2010	Alabama State	31–10
76	October 29, 2011	Alabama A&M	20–19
77	October 27, 2012	Alabama State	31–13
78	October 26, 2013	Alabama State	31–7
79	October 25, 2014	Alabama A&M	37–36
80	October 31, 2015	Alabama State	35–20
81	October 29, 2016	Alabama A&M	42–41
82	October 28, 2017	Alabama State	21–16
83	October 27, 2018	Alabama A&M	27–10
84	October 26, 2019	Alabama A&M	43–41^{3OT}
85	April 17, 2021	Alabama A&M	38–14
86	October 30, 2021	Alabama A&M	42–28
87	October 29, 2022	Alabama State	24–17
88	October 28, 2023	Alabama State	31–16
89	October 26, 2024	Alabama State	27–19
90	October 25, 2025	Alabama State	56–13
91	October 31, 2026	Alabama A&M	31–28
Series: Alabama A&M leads 45–43–3
† Alabama State later forfeited the 2001 game as part of an NCAA penalty for violations committed.

== See also ==
- List of NCAA college football rivalry games
- List of black college football classics
