= Southland Conference baseball tournament =

Southland Conference Baseball Tournament
- Conference Baseball Championship
- Sport: Baseball
- Conference: Southland Conference
- Number of teams: 7
- Format: Double-elimination tournament
- Current stadium: Joe Miller Ballpark
- Current location: Lake Charles, Louisiana
- Played: 1964–1968, 1993–present
- Last contest: 2024
- Current champion: Houston Christian (2)
- Most championships: Sam Houston (6)
- TV partner: ESPN+
- Official website: Southland.org Baseball

The Southland Conference baseball tournament is the conference championship tournament in baseball for the Southland Conference. The winner of the tournament receives the conference's automatic bid to the NCAA Division I baseball tournament.

== Tournament ==
The Southland Conference Baseball Tournament is a double-elimination tournament held annually at various locations in the Southland Conference region. The tournament field has grown from three teams in 1964 to eight teams prior to 2022. Following the departure of five members in 2021, all remaining conference members participated in the tournament (unless banned due to NCAA sanctions) in 2022. In 2023, the seven highest teams participated in the tournament. The winner receives an automatic bid to the NCAA Division I baseball tournament. Other teams have to hope for an at-large bid.

== History ==
The Southland Conference tournament began in 1964. The number of annual tournament participants has changed several times over the life of the tournament. From 1964 through 1966 the tournament consisted of three teams. In 1967 and 1968 the tournament expanded to a four-team double-elimination tournament. This was all that constituted conference play for those seasons.

From 1969 until 1992, the Southland Conference did not have a baseball tournament. In some seasons, a championship series was held between division champions.

In 1993, the conference began holding a baseball tournament again. From 1993 through 1995, the tournament was a four team double-elimination tournament.,

In 1996, it expanded to become a six team double-elimination tournament and remained that way until 2007.

In 2008, the tournament once again expanded and became an eight team double-elimination tournament.

In 2012, two brackets of four teams were added in a double-elimination format. The winner of each bracket plays in a championship game. This facilitates a television broadcast of the final.

After five schools left the conference following the 2021 season, the tournament format was changed for 2022. The top two seeds hosted double-elimination tournaments that each involved four teams. The winner from each site will advanced to a best-of-3 final hosted by the top surviving seed.

Starting in 2023, the event moved to Joe Miller Ballpark on the campus of McNeese State University in Lake Charles, Louisiana, reportedly as part of a deal that kept McNeese in the Southland after it had been courted by Conference USA and nearly joined the Western Athletic Conference. The agreement with McNeese initially runs for four years, with McNeese having the right of first refusal to continue as host after 2026. The tournament format in 2023 included seven teams beginning with a single-elimination game followed by a 6 team double elimination. Two teams did not qualify for the tournament with the new format.

The baseball tournament venue returned to an annual bidding process for 2024 following the men's and women's basketball tournaments venue extension in Lake Charles. The baseball tournament returned to Pat Kenelly Diamond at Alumni Field in Hammond, Louisiana for 2024. In 2024, the tournament returned to two brackets of four teams in a double-elimination format. The winner of each bracket played in the championship game. One team did not qualify for the tournament.

== Champions ==
=== By year ===
Year	School	Site	MVP
1964	Trinity	ACC Field • Abilene, Texas	
1965	Trinity	Jonesboro, Arkansas	
1966	Trinity	Turnpike Stadium • Arlington, Texas	
1967	Arkansas State	Price Daniel Field • Beaumont, Texas	
1968	Arkansas State	Arlington, Texas	
No tournament held (1969–1992)
1993	McNeese State	Brown–Stroud Field • Natchitoches, Louisiana	Clint Gould, McNeese State
1994	UTSA	Brown–Stroud Field • Natchitoches, Louisiana	Scott Pederson, UT San Antonio
1995	Louisiana–Monroe	Fair Grounds Field • Shreveport, Louisiana	Stacey Wilcox, Louisiana–Monroe
1996	Sam Houston State	Fair Grounds Field • Shreveport, Louisiana	Brent Bubela, Sam Houston State
1997	Texas State	Warhawk Field • Monroe, Louisiana	Jeremy Fikac, Texas State
1998	Nicholls State	Fair Grounds Field • Shreveport, Louisiana	Jacques Jobert, Nicholls State
1999	Texas State	Warhawk Field • Monroe, Louisiana	Matt Mize, UT Arlington
2000	Texas State	Warhawk Field • Monroe, Louisiana	Shane Webb, Louisiana-Monroe
2001	Texas–Arlington	Vincent–Beck Stadium • Beaumont, Texas	K. J. Hendricks, UT Arlington
2002	Lamar	Vincent–Beck Stadium • Beaumont, Texas	Clay Hensley, Lamar
2003	McNeese State	Warhawk Field • Monroe, Louisiana	Rusty Begnaud, McNeese State
2004	Lamar	Alumni Field • Hammond, Louisiana	Jordan Foster, Lamar
2005	UTSA	Brown–Stroud Field • Natchitoches, Louisiana	Ryan Crew, UT San Antonio
2006	Texas–Arlington	Vincent–Beck Stadium • Beaumont, Texas	Ryan Riddle, UT Arlington
2007	Sam Houston State	Brown–Stroud Field • Natchitoches, Louisiana	Luke Prihoda, Sam Houston State
2008	Sam Houston State	Don Sanders Stadium • Huntsville, Texas	Bobby Verbick, Sam Houston State
2009	Sam Houston State	Whataburger Field • Corpus Christi, Texas	Matt Shelton, Sam Houston State
2010	Lamar	Whataburger Field • Corpus Christi, Texas	Anthony Moore, Lamar
2011	Texas State	Bobcat Ballpark • San Marcos, Texas	Casey Kalenkosky, Texas State
2012	Texas–Arlington	Bobcat Ballpark • San Marcos, Texas	Travis Sibley, UT Arlington
2013	Central Arkansas	Constellation Field • Sugar Land, Texas	Forrestt Allday, Central Arkansas
2014	Southeastern Louisiana	Bear Stadium • Conway, Arkansas	Tate Scioneaux, Southeastern Louisiana
2015	Houston Baptist	Constellation Field • Sugar Land, Texas	Curtis Jones, Houston Baptist
2016	Sam Houston State	Constellation Field • Sugar Land, Texas	Heath Donica, Sam Houston State
2017	Sam Houston State	Constellation Field • Sugar Land, Texas	Robie Rojas, Sam Houston State
2018	Northwestern State	Constellation Field • Sugar Land, Texas	David Fry, Northwestern State
2019	McNeese State	Constellation Field • Sugar Land, Texas	Aidan Anderson, McNeese State
2020	Canceled due to the COVID-19 pandemic		
2021	McNeese	Alumni Field • Hammond, Louisiana	Clayton Rasbeary, McNeese
2022	Southeastern Louisiana	Campus sites of top two seeds	Preston Faulkner, Southeastern Louisiana
2023	Nicholls	Joe Miller Ballpark • Lake Charles, Louisiana	Xane Washington, Nicholls
2024	Nicholls	Alumni Field • Hammond, Louisiana	Basiel Williams, Nicholls
2025	Houston Christian	Husky Field • Houston, Texas	Parker Edwards, Houston Christian
2026	Lamar	Vincent-Beck Stadium • Beaumont, Texas	Chris Olivier, Lamar

- McNeese dropped "State" from its athletic branding after the 2019 season.
- Nicholls dropped "State" from its athletic branding after the 2018 season.
- In 2022, Houston Baptist rebranded to Houston Christian.

=== By school ===
Updated through 2024 Tournament.

School	Appearances	W-L	Pct	Tournament Titles	Title Years	Notes
Sam Houston	17	39–23	.629	6	1996, 2007, 2008, 2009, 2016, 2017	Left conference in 2021.
Lamar	21	42–35	.545	4	2002, 2004, 2010, 2026	Left conference in 1987. Returned in 1999. Left conference again in 2021. Returned in 2022.
McNeese	21	32–34	.485	4	1993, 2003, 2019, 2021	
Texas State	17	35–28	.556	4	1997, 1999, 2000, 2011	Left conference in 2012.
Nicholls	10	17–13	.567	3	1998, 2023, 2024	
Texas–Arlington	15	28–26	.519	3	2001, 2006, 2012	Left conference in 2012.
Trinity	5	12–6	.667	3	1964, 1965, 1966	Left conference in 1972.
Southeastern Louisiana	15	27–28	.491	2	2014, 2022	Joined conference in 1997.
UTSA	12	19–20	.487	2	1994, 2005	Left conference in 2012.
Arkansas State	5	11–6	.647	2	1967, 1968	Left conference in 1987.
Northwestern State	24	29–45	.392	1	2018	
Houston Christian	4	11–6	.647	2	2015, 2025	Joined conference in 2013.
Louisiana–Monroe	10	16–17	.485	1	1995	Left conference in 2006.
Central Arkansas	6	13–10	.565	1	2013	Joined conference in 2006. Left conference in 2021.
Texas A&M–Corpus Christi	9	13–17	.433	0		Joined conference in 2006.
Stephen F. Austin	8	9–16	.360	0		Left conference in 2021; returning in 2024.
New Orleans	5	9–9	.500	0		Joined conference in 2014.
UIW	4	5–8	.385	0		Joined conference in 2013.
Abilene Christian	6	2–12	.143	0		Left conference in 1973. Returned in 2013. Left conference again in 2021.
Oral Roberts	1	2–2	.500	0		Conference member from 2012 to 2014.
UTRGV	1	0-2	.000	0		Joined conference in 2025.

- Italics indicate that the program is no longer a Southland member, as of the next NCAA baseball season in 2025.

== See also ==
Southland Conference softball tournament
