= Sherman Corbett =

American baseball player (born 1962)

UTSA Roadrunners
- Pitcher
- Born: November 3, 1962 (age 63); New Braunfels, Texas, U.S.
- Batted: Left Threw: Left

MLB debut
- May 29, 1988, for the California Angels

Last MLB appearance
- May 5, 1990, for the California Angels

MLB statistics
- Win–loss record: 2–1
- Earned run average: 4.50
- Strikeouts: 33
- Stats at Baseball Reference

Teams
- California Angels (1988–1990)

Sherman Stanley Corbett (born November 3, 1962) is an American former professional baseball player who played three seasons for the California Angels of Major League Baseball (MLB). He was the head baseball coach at the University of Texas at San Antonio until he became the assistant to the athletic director in 2012.

== Head coach record ==
Statistics overview
Season	Team	Overall	Conference	Standing	Postseason
UTSA Roadrunners (Southland Conference) (2001–2012)
2001	UTSA	30-29	15-12	5th	Southland tournament
2002	UTSA	25-29	13-14	7th	
2003	UTSA	29-27	12-15	T-6th	
2004	UTSA	27-31	12-14	T-5th	Southland tournament
2005	UTSA	27-34	14-13	T-4th	NCAA Regional
2006	UTSA	37-22	20-10	T-2nd	Southland tournament
2007	UTSA	36-22	24-6	1st	Southland tournament
2008	UTSA	39-19	22-8	1st	Southland tournament
2009	UTSA	32-24	20-12	3rd	Southland tournament
2010	UTSA	22-28	13-20	9th	
2011	UTSA	27-32	16-17	6th	Southland tournament
2012	UTSA	22-32	11-21	12th	
UTSA:		353–329	192–162		
Total:		353–329			
