= 2005 Southland Conference baseball tournament =

- Teams: 6
- Format: Double-elimination
- Finals site: H. Alvin Brown–C. C. Stroud Field; Natchitoches, Louisiana
- Champions: UTSA (2nd title)
- Winning coach: Sherman Corbett (1st title)
- MVP: Ryan Crew (UTSA)

2005 Southland Conference baseball standings
	Conf.						Overall
Team	W		L		T	PCT	W		L		T	PCT
Northwestern State ‍†‍‍^{y}	22	–	5	–	0	.815	41	–	20	–	0	.672
Lamar ‍‍‍	16	–	11	–	0	.593	38	–	23	–	0	.623
Texas State ‍‍‍	15	–	12	–	0	.556	32	–	26	–	0	.552
Texas–Arlington ‍‍‍	14	–	13	–	0	.519	26	–	32	–	0	.448
Texas–San Antonio ‍‍‡‍^{y}	14	–	13	–	0	.519	27	–	34	–	0	.443
Southeastern Louisiana ‍‍‍	13	–	14	–	0	.481	29	–	31	–	0	.483
Sam Houston State ‍‍‍	13	–	14	–	0	.481	24	–	29	–	1	.454
McNeese State ‍‍‍	12	–	15	–	0	.444	23	–	31	–	0	.426
Louisiana–Monroe ‍‍‍	9	–	18	–	0	.333	26	–	29	–	0	.473
Nicholls State ‍‍‍	7	–	20	–	0	.259	22	–	31	–	0	.415
† – Conference champion ‡ – Tournament champion y – Invited to the NCAA tournament As of June 30, 2005; Rankings from Collegiate Baseball

The 2005 Southland Conference baseball tournament was held from May 25 through 28, 2005 to determine the champion of the Southland Conference in the sport of college baseball for the 2005 season. The event pitted the top six finishers from the conference's regular season in a double-elimination tournament held at H. Alvin Brown–C. C. Stroud Field, home field of Northwestern State in Natchitoches, Louisiana. Fourth-seeded UTSA won their second overall championship and claimed the automatic bid to the 2005 NCAA Division I baseball tournament.

== Seeding and format ==
The top six finishers from the regular season were seeded one through six. They played a double-elimination tournament.

Team	W	L	T	Pct	Seed
Northwestern State	22	5	.815	—	1
Lamar	16	11	.593	6	2
Texas State	15	12	.556	7	3
UTSA	14	13	.519	8	4
Texas–Arlington	14	13	.519	8	5
Southeastern Louisiana	13	14	.481	9	6
Sam Houston State	13	14	.481	9	—
McNeese State	12	15	.444	10	—
Louisiana–Monroe	9	18	.333	13	—
Nicholls State	7	20	.259	15	—

== Bracket and results ==
First round
1	Northwestern State	0
6	Southeastern Louisiana	3^{10}
3	Texas State	7
4	UTSA	8
2	Lamar	7
5	Texas–Arlington	1

Second round
6	Southeastern Louisiana	4
3	Texas State	3
4	UTSA	6
2	Lamar	3
3	Texas State	1
5	Texas–Arlington	4

Third round
6	Southeastern Louisiana	8
4	UTSA	9^{10}
2	Lamar	8
5	Texas–Arlington	3

Semifinals
6	Southeastern Louisiana	3
2	Lamar	9

Final
4	UTSA	4	—
2	Lamar	1	—

== All-Tournament Team ==
The following players were named to the All-Tournament Team.

Pos.	Name	School
P	Bernard Robert	Southeastern Louisiana
P	Aaron Rodriguez	UTSA
C	Michael Ambort	Lamar
1B	Lee Todesco	UTSA
2B	J.R. Voyles	UTSA
3B	Daniel Macha	Texas–Arlington
SS	Ryan Crew	UTSA
OF	Collin DeLome	Lamar
OF	Chase Richards	Lamar
OF	Sean Danielson	UTSA
DH	Stephen Holdren	UTSA

=== Most Valuable Player ===
Ryan Crew was named Tournament Most Valuable Player. Crew was a shortstop for UTSA.
