= 2009 Southland Conference baseball tournament =

- Teams: 8
- Format: Double-elimination
- Finals site: Whataburger Field; Corpus Christi, Texas
- Champions: Sam Houston State (4th title)
- Winning coach: Mark Johnson (3rd title)
- MVP: Matt Shelton (Sam Houston State)

2009 Southland Conference baseball standings
	Conf.						Overall
Team	W		L		T	PCT	W		L		T	PCT
Texas State ‍†‍‍	24	–	7	–	0	.774	41	–	17	–	0	.707
Southeastern Louisiana ‍‍‍	21	–	12	–	0	.636	37	–	22	–	0	.627
Texas–San Antonio ‍‍‍	20	–	12	–	0	.625	32	–	24	–	0	.571
Lamar ‍‍‍	20	–	13	–	0	.606	38	–	22	–	0	.633
Texas–Arlington ‍‍‍	19	–	13	–	0	.594	30	–	26	–	0	.536
Northwestern State ‍‍‍	18	–	13	–	0	.581	26	–	26	–	0	.500
Sam Houston State ‍‍‡‍^{y}	18	–	14	–	0	.563	36	–	24	–	0	.600
Stephen F. Austin ‍‍‍	14	–	18	–	0	.438	23	–	32	–	0	.418
Central Arkansas ‍‍‍	10	–	21	–	0	.323	22	–	30	–	0	.423
McNeese State ‍‍‍	10	–	22	–	0	.313	21	–	30	–	0	.412
Nicholls State ‍‍‍	9	–	23	–	0	.281	19	–	32	–	0	.373
Texas A&M–Corpus Christi ‍‍‍	9	–	24	–	0	.273	18	–	38	–	0	.321
† – Conference champion ‡ – Tournament champion y – Invited to the NCAA tournament As of May 23, 2009; Rankings from Collegiate Baseball

The 2009 Southland Conference baseball tournament was held from May 20 through 23. The top eight regular season finishers of the league's twelve teams met in the double-elimination tournament held at Whataburger Field in Corpus Christi, Texas. The winner of the tournament, Sam Houston State, earned the conference's automatic bid to the 2009 NCAA Division I baseball tournament.

== Seeding and format ==
The top eight finishers from the regular season were seeded one through eight. They played a two bracket, double-elimination tournament, with the winner of each bracket meeting in a single championship final.

Team	W	L	T	Pct	Seed
Texas State	24	7	0	.774	1
Southeastern Louisiana	21	12	0	.636	2
Texas–San Antonio	20	12	0	.625	3
Lamar	20	13	0	.606	4
Texas–Arlington	19	13	0	.594	5
Northwestern State	18	13	0	.581	6
Sam Houston State	18	14	0	.563	7
Stephen F. Austin	14	18	0	.438	8
Central Arkansas	10	21	0	.323	–
McNeese State	10	22	0	.313	–
Nicholls State	9	23	0	.281	–
Texas A&M–Corpus Christi	9	24	0	.273	–

== Results ==
First round
1	Texas State	9
8	Stephen F. Austin	2
4	Lamar	4
5	Texas–Arlington	3
5	Texas–Arlington	7
8	Stephen F. Austin	4
3	Texas–San Antonio	5
6	Northwestern State	4
2	Southeastern Louisiana	2
7	Sam Houston State	9
6	Northwestern State	7
2	Southeastern Louisiana	9

Second round
7	Lamar	4
1	Texas State	10
4	Lamar	4
5	Texas–Arlington	3
3	Texas–San Antonio	6 (11)
7	Sam Houston State	8
3	Texas-San Antonio	4
2	Southeastern Louisiana	5

Semifinals
4	Lamar	2
1	Texas State	13
7	Sam Houston State	7	—
2	Southeastern Louisiana	2	—

Final
1	Texas State	1
7	Sam Houston State	7

== All-Tournament Team ==
The following players were named to the All-Tournament Team.

Pos	Name	Team
C	Mark Wyatt	Sam Houston State
1B	Paul Goldschmidt	Texas State
2B	Ty Summerlin	Southeastern Louisiana
SS	Jason Martinson	Texas State
3B	Chris Dunkin	Lamar
OF	Adam DeLaGarza	Sam Houston State
OF	Anthony Moore	Lamar
OF	Bret Atwood	Texas State
DH	Brian McCants	Southeastern Louisiana
P	Sean Weatherford	Sam Houston State
P	Matt Shelton	Sam Houston State (MVP)
