= 2008 Southland Conference baseball tournament =

- Teams: 8
- Format: Double-elimination
- Finals site: Don Sanders Stadium; Huntsville, Texas
- Champions: Sam Houston State (3rd title)
- Winning coach: Mark Johnson (2nd title)
- MVP: Bobby Verbick (Sam Houston State)

2008 Southland Conference baseball standings
	Conf.						Overall
Team	W		L		T	PCT	W		L		T	PCT
Eastern
Lamar ‍‍‍	20	–	10	–	0	.667	35	–	23	–	0	.603
Northwestern State ‍‍‍	17	–	12	–	0	.586	28	–	28	–	0	.500
Southeastern Louisiana ‍‍‍	15	–	15	–	0	.500	32	–	27	–	0	.542
Central Arkansas ‍‍‍	13	–	16	–	1	.450	27	–	27	–	1	.500
McNeese State ‍‍‍	7	–	23	–	0	.233	13	–	42	–	0	.236
Nicholls State ‍‍‍	5	–	25	–	0	.167	10	–	44	–	0	.185
Western
Texas–San Antonio ‍‍‍	22	–	8	–	0	.733	39	–	19	–	0	.672
Texas State ‍†‍‍	19	–	11	–	0	.633	30	–	27	–	0	.526
Sam Houston State ‍‍‡‍^{y}	18	–	12	–	0	.600	37	–	25	–	0	.597
Texas–Arlington ‍‍‍	16	–	14	–	0	.533	26	–	31	–	0	.456
Texas A&M–Corpus Christi ‍‍‍	14	–	15	–	1	.483	24	–	33	–	1	.422
Stephen F. Austin ‍‍‍	12	–	17	–	0	.414	25	–	29	–	0	.463
† – Conference champion ‡ – Tournament champion y – Invited to the NCAA tournament As of May 24, 2008; Rankings from Collegiate Baseball

The 2008 Southland Conference baseball tournament was held from May 21 through 24. The top eight regular season finishers of the league's twelve teams met in the double-elimination tournament held at Don Sanders Stadium in Huntsville, Texas. The winner of the tournament, Sam Houston State, earned the conference's automatic bid to the 2008 NCAA Division I baseball tournament.

== Seeding and format ==
The top eight finishers from the regular season were seeded one through eight. They played a two bracket, double-elimination tournament, with the winner of each bracket meeting in a single championship final.

Team	W	L	T	Pct	Seed
Texas–San Antonio	22	8	0	.733	1
Lamar	20	10	0	.667	2
Texas State	19	11	0	.633	3
Sam Houston State	18	12	0	.600	4
Northwestern State	17	12	0	.586	5
Texas–Arlington	16	14	0	.533	6
Southeastern Louisiana	15	15	0	.500	7
Texas A&M–Corpus Christi	14	15	1	.483	8
Central Arkansas	13	16	1	.450	–
Stephen F. Austin	12	17	0	.414	–
McNeese State	7	23	0	.233	–
Nicholls State	5	25	0	.167	–

== Results ==
First round
1	Texas–San Antonio	5
8	Texas A&M–Corpus Christi	7
4	Sam Houston State	7
5	Northwestern State	1
1	Texas–San Antonio	9
5	Northwestern State	7
3	Texas State	22
6	Texas–Arlington	2
2	Lamar	8
7	Southeastern Louisiana	7
6	Texas–Arlington	3
7	Southeastern Louisiana	7

Second round
8	Texas A&M–Corpus Christi	2
4	Sam Houston State	13
1	Texas–San Antonio	10
8	Texas A&M–Corpus Christi	12
3	Texas State	7
2	Lamar	11
3	Texas State	7
7	Southeastern Louisiana	11

Semifinals
8	Texas A&M–Corpus Christi	5
4	Sam Houston State	7
2	Lamar	1	4
7	Southeastern Louisiana	17	2

Final
4	Sam Houston State	15
2	Lamar	7

== All-Tournament Team ==
The following players were named to the All-Tournament Team.

Pos	Name	Team
C	Ben Theriot	Texas State
1B	Trent Lockwood	Texas–San Antonio
2B	Brian Taylor	Lamar
3B	Seth Hammock	Sam Houston State
SS	Ryan Weber	Sam Houston State
OF	Keith Stein	Sam Houston State
OF	Chase Williams	Texas A&M–Corpus Christi
OF	David Moore	Lamar
DH	Bobby Verbick	Sam Houston State (MVP)
P	Brian Sisk	Lamar
P	Dallas Gallant	Sam Houston State
