= 2002 Southland Conference baseball tournament =

- Teams: 6
- Format: Double-elimination
- Finals site: Vincent–Beck Stadium; Beaumont, Texas
- Champions: Lamar (1st title)
- Winning coach: Jim Gilligan (1st title)
- MVP: Clay Hensley (Lamar)

2002 Southland Conference baseball standings
	Conf.				Overall
Team	W		L	PCT	W		L	PCT
Northwestern State ‍†‍‍	17	–	10	.630	43	–	17	.717
Louisiana–Monroe ‍‍‍	17	–	10	.630	29	–	29	.500
Lamar ‍‍‡‍^{y}	16	–	11	.593	36	–	24	.600
Texas–Arlington ‍‍‍	15	–	11	.577	29	–	29	.500
McNeese State ‍‍‍	15	–	12	.556	30	–	28	.517
Southwest Texas State ‍‍‍	14	–	13	.519	36	–	24	.600
Texas–San Antonio ‍‍‍	13	–	14	.481	25	–	29	.463
Nicholls State ‍‍‍	11	–	15	.423	28	–	26	.519
Sam Houston State ‍‍‍	9	–	18	.333	21	–	33	.389
Southeastern Louisiana ‍‍‍	7	–	20	.259	21	–	33	.389
† – Conference champion ‡ – Tournament champion y – Invited to the NCAA tournament As of June 30, 2002; Rankings from Collegiate Baseball

The 2002 Southland Conference baseball tournament was held from May 22 through 24, 2002 to determine the champion of the Southland Conference in the sport of college baseball for the 2002 season. The event pitted the top six finishers from the conference's regular season in a double-elimination tournament held at Vincent–Beck Stadium, home field of Lamar in Beaumont, Texas. Third-seeded Lamar won their first championship and claimed the automatic bid to the 2002 NCAA Division I baseball tournament.

== Seeding and format ==
The top six finishers from the regular season were seeded one through six. They played a double-elimination tournament.

Team	W	L	T	Pct	Seed
Northwestern State	17	10	.630	—	1
Louisiana–Monroe	17	10	.630	—	2
Lamar	16	11	.593	1	3
Texas–Arlington	15	11	.577	1.5	4
McNeese State	15	12	.556	2	5
Southwest Texas State	14	13	.519	3	6
UTSA	13	14	.481	4	—
Nicholls State	11	15	.423	5.5	—
Sam Houston State	9	18	.333	8	—
Southeastern Louisiana	7	20	.259	10	—

== Bracket and results ==
First round
1	Northwestern State	0
6	Southwest Texas State	11
3	Lamar	5
4	Texas–Arlington	3
2	Louisiana–Monroe	6
5	McNeese State	7

Second round
6	Southwest Texas State	4
4	Texas–Arlington	0
3	Lamar	4
5	McNeese State	3
1	Northwestern State	12
2	Louisiana–Monroe	3

Third round
6	Southwest Texas State	0
3	Lamar	7
5	McNeese State	2
1	Northwestern State	9

Semifinals
6	Southwest Texas State	4
1	Northwestern State	6

Final
3	Lamar	5	—
1	Northwestern State	4	—

== All-Tournament Team ==
The following players were named to the All-Tournament Team.

Pos.	Name	School
P	Josh Gray	Lamar
P	Clay Hensley	Lamar
C	Matt Gowan	Lamar
1B	Chris Micheles	Southwest Texas State
2B	Blake Justice	Lamar
3B	Mickey Hernandez	Lamar
SS	Ricky Solis	Northwestern State
OF	Alonzo Soliz	Northwestern State
OF	Jordan Foster	Lamar
OF	Tommy Eubanks	McNeese State
DH	Anatole Vincent	Northwestern State

=== Most Valuable Player ===
Clay Hensley was named Tournament Most Valuable Player. Hensley was a pitcher for Lamar.
