= 1995 Southland Conference baseball tournament =

- Teams: 4
- Format: Double-elimination
- Finals site: Fair Grounds Field; Shreveport, Louisiana
- Champions: Northeast Louisiana (1st title)
- Winning coach: Smoke Laval (1st title)
- MVP: Stacey Wilcox (Northeast Louisiana)

1995 Southland Conference baseball standings
	Conf.				Overall
Team	W		L	PCT	W		L	PCT
Northwestern State ‍†‍‍	19	–	5	.792	37	–	13	.740
McNeese State ‍‍‍	17	–	6	.739	39	–	14	.736
Northeast Louisiana ‍‍‡‍^{y}	16	–	7	.696	34	–	20	.630
Texas–Arlington ‍‍‍	14	–	10	.583	26	–	30	.464
Texas–San Antonio ‍‍‍	13	–	11	.542	31	–	23	.574
Southwest Texas State ‍‍‍	10	–	14	.417	23	–	31	.426
Sam Houston State ‍‍‍	10	–	14	.417	22	–	32	.407
Nicholls State ‍‍‍	8	–	16	.333	23	–	28	.451
Stephen F. Austin ‍‍‍	0	–	24	.000	2	–	40	.048
† – Conference champion ‡ – Tournament champion y – Invited to the NCAA tournament As of June 30, 1995; Rankings from Collegiate Baseball

The 1995 Southland Conference baseball tournament was held from May 13 to 15 to determine the champion of the Southland Conference in the sport of college baseball for the 1995 season. The event pitted the top four finishers from the conference's regular season in a double-elimination tournament held at Fair Grounds Field in Shreveport, Louisiana. Third-seeded Northeast Louisiana won their first championship and claimed the automatic bid to the 1995 NCAA Division I baseball tournament.

== Seeding and format ==
The top four finishers from the regular season were seeded one through four. They played a double-elimination tournament.

Team	W	L	T	Pct	Seed
Northwestern State	19	5	.792	—	1
McNeese State	17	6	.739	1.5	2
Northeast Louisiana	16	7	.696	2.5	3
Texas–Arlington	14	10	.583	5	4
UTSA	13	11	.542	6	—
Southwest Texas State	10	14	.417	9	—
Sam Houston State	10	14	.417	9	—
Nicholls State	8	16	.333	11	—
Stephen F. Austin	0	24	.000	19	—

== Bracket and results ==
Upper round 1
1	Northwestern State	3
4	Texas–Arlington	11
3	Northeast Louisiana	4
2	McNeese State	0
Lower round 1
1	Northwestern State	3
2	McNeese State	7

Upper final
4	Texas–Arlington	5
3	Northeast Louisiana	6^{10}
Lower final
4	Texas–Arlington	2
2	McNeese State	4

Final
3	Northeast Louisiana
2	McNeese State

== All-Tournament Team ==
The following players were named to the All-Tournament Team.

Pos.	Name	School
P	Denny Bair	Northeast Louisiana
P	Russel Reeder	McNeese State
C	Danny Ardoin	McNeese State
1B	Andy Russell	Northeast Louisiana
2B	Stacey Wilcox	Northeast Louisiana
3B	Matt Donner	Northwestern State
SS	Brett Elam	McNeese State
OF	Terry Joseph	Northwestern State
OF	Tommy Lewis	Northeast Louisiana
OF	Curt Lowry	McNeese State
DH	Paul Stovall	Texas–Arlington

=== Most Valuable Player ===
Stacey Wilcox was named Tournament Most Valuable Player. Wilcox was a second baseman for Northeast Louisiana.
