= 2003 Southland Conference baseball tournament =

- Teams: 6
- Format: Double-elimination
- Finals site: Warhawk Field; Monroe, Louisiana
- Champions: McNeese State (2nd title)
- Winning coach: Todd Butler (1st title)
- MVP: Rusty Begnaud (McNeese State)

2003 Southland Conference baseball standings
	Conf.				Overall
Team	W		L	PCT	W		L	PCT
No. 22 Lamar ‍†‍‍^{y}	20	–	6	.769	40	–	18	.690
Southwest Texas State ‍‍‍	19	–	7	.731	30	–	28	.517
Texas–Arlington ‍‍‍	18	–	9	.667	37	–	25	.597
Northwestern State ‍‍‍	16	–	11	.593	35	–	22	.614
Louisiana–Monroe ‍‍‍	12	–	14	.462	29	–	28	.509
McNeese State ‍‍‡‍^{y}	12	–	15	.444	31	–	30	.508
Texas–San Antonio ‍‍‍	12	–	15	.444	29	–	27	.518
Sam Houston State ‍‍‍	9	–	18	.333	20	–	33	.377
Southeastern Louisiana ‍‍‍	8	–	18	.308	18	–	35	.340
Nicholls State ‍‍‍	7	–	20	.259	22	–	32	.407
† – Conference champion ‡ – Tournament champion y – Invited to the NCAA tournament As of June 30, 2003; Rankings from Collegiate Baseball

The 2003 Southland Conference baseball tournament was held from May 21 through 23, 2003 to determine the champion of the Southland Conference in the sport of college baseball for the 2003 season. The event pitted the top six finishers from the conference's regular season in a double-elimination tournament held at Warhawk Field, home field of Louisiana–Monroe in Monroe, Louisiana. Sixth-seeded McNeese State won their second overall championship and claimed the automatic bid to the 2003 NCAA Division I baseball tournament.

== Seeding and format ==
The top six finishers from the regular season were seeded one through six. They played a double-elimination tournament.

Team	W	L	T	Pct	Seed
Lamar	20	6	.769	—	1
Southwest Texas State	19	7	.731	1	2
Texas–Arlington	18	9	.667	2.5	3
Northwestern State	16	11	.593	4.5	4
Louisiana–Monroe	12	14	.462	8	5
McNeese State	12	15	.444	8.5	6
UTSA	12	15	.444	8.5	—
Sam Houston State	9	18	.333	11.5	—
Southeastern Louisiana	8	18	.308	12	—
Nicholls State	7	20	.259	13.5	—

== Bracket and results ==
First round
1	Lamar	4
6	McNeese State	6
3	Texas–Arlington	4
4	Northwestern State	3
2	Southwest Texas State	4
5	Louisiana–Monroe	7

Second round
6	McNeese State	6
4	Northwestern State	1
3	Texas–Arlington	15
5	Louisiana–Monroe	10
1	Lamar	3
2	Southwest Texas State	4

Third round
6	McNeese State	12
3	Texas–Arlington	3
5	Louisiana–Monroe	6
2	Southwest Texas State	5

Semifinals
3	Texas–Arlington	6
5	Louisiana–Monroe	4

Final
6	McNeese State	7	14
3	Texas–Arlington	12	0

== All-Tournament Team ==
The following players were named to the All-Tournament Team.

Pos.	Name	School
P	Aaron Pullin	Texas–Arlington
P	Rusty Begnaud	McNeese State
C	Joey Wolfe	Louisiana–Monroe
1B	Tim Lemke	McNeese State
2B	Jack Skaggs	Louisiana–Monroe
3B	Ryan Roberts	Texas–Arlington
SS	Lance Dawkins	McNeese State
OF	Al Hayward	Louisiana–Monroe
OF	Paul Bruder	Texas–Arlington
OF	Dooley Prince	McNeese State
DH	Kasey Baker	Texas–Arlington

=== Most Valuable Player ===
Rusty Begnaud was named Tournament Most Valuable Player. Begnaud was a pitcher for McNeese State.
