= 2007 Southland Conference baseball tournament =

Sports competition

- Teams: 6
- Format: Double-elimination
- Finals site: H. Alvin Brown–C. C. Stroud Field; Natchitoches, Louisiana
- Champions: Sam Houston State (2nd title)
- Winning coach: Mark Johnson (1st title)
- MVP: Luke Prihoda (Sam Houston State)

2007 Southland Conference baseball standings
	Conf.				Overall
Team	W		L	PCT	W		L	PCT
Eastern
Lamar ^{x}‍‍‍	20	–	10	.667	34	–	25	.576
McNeese State ‍‍‍	17	–	12	.586	21	–	34	.382
Southeastern Louisiana ‍‍‍	16	–	14	.533	34	–	21	.618
Northwestern State ‍‍‍	15	–	14	.517	25	–	28	.472
Central Arkansas ‍‍‍	10	–	20	.333	21	–	32	.396
Nicholls State ‍‍‍	6	–	24	.200	10	–	45	.182
Western
Texas–San Antonio ^{x}‍‍‍	24	–	6	.800	36	–	22	.621
Texas State ‍‍‍	20	–	10	.667	37	–	23	.617
Sam Houston State ‍‍‡‍^{y}	18	–	12	.600	38	–	22	.633
Stephen F. Austin ‍‍‍	17	–	13	.567	31	–	28	.525
Texas A&M–Corpus Christi ‍‍‍	12	–	18	.400	27	–	29	.482
Texas–Arlington ‍‍‍	4	–	26	.133	13	–	40	.245
† – Conference champion ‡ – Tournament champion y – Invited to the NCAA tournament As of June 30, 2007; Rankings from Collegiate Baseball

The 2007 Southland Conference baseball tournament was held from May 23 through 26, 2007 to determine the champion of the Southland Conference in the sport of college baseball for the 2007 season. The event pitted the top six finishers from the conference's regular season in a double-elimination tournament held at H. Alvin Brown–C. C. Stroud Field, home field of Northwestern State in Natchitoches, Louisiana. Fourth-seeded Sam Houston State won their second overall championship, and what would be the first of three consecutive titles, and claimed the automatic bid to the 2007 NCAA Division I baseball tournament.

== Seeding and format ==
The top six finishers from the regular season were seeded one through six, regardless of division. They played a double-elimination tournament. Despite the seeding, the two division champions were protected, so that third-seeded Lamar played fifth seeded McNeese State in the first round.

Team	W	L	T	Pct	Seed
UTSA	24	6	.800	—	1
Texas State	20	10	.667	4	2
Lamar	20	10	.667	4	3
Sam Houston State	18	12	.600	6	4
McNeese State	17	12	.586	6.5	5
Stephen F. Austin	17	13	.567	7	6
Southeastern Louisiana	16	14	.533	8	—
Northwestern State	15	14	.517	8.5	—
Texas A&M–Corpus Christi	12	18	.400	12	—
Central Arkansas	10	20	.333	14	—
Nicholls State	6	24	.200	18	—
Texas–Arlington	4	26	.133	20	—

== Bracket and results ==
First round
1	UTSA	4
6	Stephen F. Austin	2
2	Texas State	0
4	Sam Houston State	2
3	Lamar	12^{7}
5	McNeese State	2

Second round
1	UTSA	6
2	Texas State	9^{10}
6	Stephen F. Austin	11
5	McNeese State	3
4	Sam Houston State	7
3	Lamar	3
1	UTSA	7
3	Lamar	6

Third round
2	Texas State	7
6	Stephen F. Austin	0
4	Sam Houston State	5
1	UTSA	4

Final
2	Texas State	1	—
4	Sam Houston State	3	—

== All-Tournament Team ==
The following players were named to the All-Tournament Team.

Pos.	Name	School
P	Mike Hart	Texas State
P	Luke Prihoda	Sam Houston State
C	Heath Pugh	Sam Houston State
1B	Dan Hernandez	Lamar
2B	Clint Mann	Sam Houston State
3B	Ryan Saltzgaber	UTSA
SS	Thomas Field	Texas State
OF	Aaron Garza	Texas State
OF	Bobby Verbick	Sam Houston State
OF	Keith Stein	Sam Houston State
DH	David Jeans	Stephen F. Austin

=== Most Valuable Player ===
Luke Prihoda was named Tournament Most Valuable Player. Prihoda was a pitcher for Sam Houston State.
