= 1998 Southland Conference baseball tournament =

- Teams: 6
- Format: Double-elimination
- Finals site: Fair Grounds Field; Shreveport, Louisiana
- Champions: Nicholls State (1st title)
- Winning coach: Jim Pizzolatto (1st title)
- MVP: Jacques Jobert (Nicholls State)

1998 Southland Conference baseball standings
	Conf.				Overall
Team	W		L	PCT	W		L	PCT
Northwestern State ‍†‍‍	15	–	8	.652	40	–	20	.667
Northeast Louisiana ‍‍‍	13	–	9	.591	33	–	22	.600
McNeese State ‍‍‍	13	–	10	.565	30	–	26	.536
Nicholls State ‍‍‡‍^{y}	13	–	11	.542	28	–	34	.452
Southwest Texas State ‍‍‍	13	–	11	.542	28	–	28	.500
Sam Houston State ‍‍‍	12	–	11	.522	29	–	28	.509
Texas–Arlington ‍‍‍	9	–	13	.409	20	–	29	.408
Southeastern Louisiana ‍‍‍	9	–	14	.391	29	–	27	.518
Texas–San Antonio ‍‍‍	7	–	17	.292	23	–	28	.451
† – Conference champion ‡ – Tournament champion y – Invited to the NCAA tournament As of June 30, 1998; Rankings from Collegiate Baseball

The 1998 Southland Conference baseball tournament was held from May 13 to 16, 1998 to determine the champion of the Southland Conference in the sport of college baseball for the 1998 season. The event pitted the top six finishers from the conference's regular season in a double-elimination tournament held at Fair Grounds Field in Shreveport, Louisiana. Fourth-seeded Nicholls State won their first championship and claimed the automatic bid to the 1998 NCAA Division I baseball tournament.

== Seeding and format ==
The top six finishers from the regular season were seeded one through six. They played a double-elimination tournament.

Team	W	L	T	Pct	Seed
Northwestern State	15	8	.652	—	1
Northeast Louisiana	13	9	.591	1.5	2
McNeese State	13	10	.565	2	3
Nicholls State	13	11	.542	2.5	4
Southwest Texas State	13	11	.542	2.5	5
Sam Houston State	12	11	.522	3	6
Texas–Arlington	9	13	.409	5.5	—
Southeastern Louisiana	9	14	.391	6	—
UTSA	7	17	.292	8.5	—

== Bracket and results ==
First round
1	Northwestern State	2
6	Sam Houston State	6
3	McNeese State	9
4	Nicholls State	12
2	Northeast Louisiana	1
5	Southwest Texas State	9

Second round
6	Sam Houston State	10
3	McNeese State	5
4	Nicholls State	7
5	Southwest Texas State	1
1	Northwestern State	11
2	Northeast Louisiana	0

Third round
6	Sam Houston State	8
4	Nicholls State	14
5	Southwest Texas State	3
1	Northwestern State	7

Semifinals
6	Sam Houston State	1
1	Northwestern State	8

Final
4	Nicholls State	5	—
1	Northwestern State	4	—

== All-Tournament Team ==
The following players were named to the All-Tournament Team.

Pos.	Name	School
P	Cheyenne Jenke	Nicholls State
P	Cody Arcement	Nicholls State
C	Chris Phillips	Northwestern State
1B	Scott Duplantis	Nicholls State
2B	Jacques Jobert	Nicholls State
3B	Kevin Perret	Nicholls State
SS	Ryan Anholt	Northwestern State
OF	Brent Trosclair	Northwestern State
OF	Fred Knox	Nicholls State
OF	Chris Roosma	Nicholls State
DH	Tommy Cliffe	Sam Houston State

=== Most Valuable Player ===
Jacques Jobert was named Tournament Most Valuable Player. Jobert was a second baseman for Nicholls State.
