= 2006 Southland Conference baseball tournament =

- Teams: 6
- Format: Double-elimination
- Finals site: Vincent–Beck Stadium; Beaumont, Texas
- Champions: Texas–Arlington (2nd title)
- Winning coach: Jeff Curtis (1st title)
- MVP: Ryan Riddle (Texas–Arlington)

2006 Southland Conference baseball standings
	Conf.				Overall
Team	W		L	PCT	W		L	PCT
McNeese State ‍†‍‍	22	–	8	.733	35	–	20	.636
Texas–San Antonio ‍‍‍	20	–	10	.667	37	–	22	.627
Texas State ‍‍‍	20	–	10	.667	29	–	30	.492
Lamar ‍‍‍	19	–	11	.633	35	–	23	.603
Texas–Arlington ‍‍‡‍^{y}	16	–	12	.571	29	–	36	.446
Northwestern State ‍‍‍	15	–	15	.500	33	–	28	.541
Southeastern Louisiana ‍‍‍	14	–	16	.467	23	–	32	.418
Louisiana–Monroe ‍‍‍	12	–	16	.429	18	–	37	.327
Sam Houston State ‍‍‍	12	–	18	.400	23	–	31	.426
Nicholls State ‍‍‍	7	–	23	.233	15	–	41	.268
Stephen F. Austin ‍‍‍	6	–	24	.200	13	–	40	.245
† – Conference champion ‡ – Tournament champion y – Invited to the NCAA tournament As of June 30, 2006; Rankings from Collegiate Baseball

The 2006 Southland Conference baseball tournament was held from May 24 through 27, 2006 to determine the champion of the Southland Conference in the sport of college baseball for the 2006 season. The event pitted the top six finishers from the conference's regular season in a double-elimination tournament held at Vincent–Beck Stadium, home field of Lamar in Beaumont, Texas. Fifth-seeded Texas–Arlington won their second overall championship and claimed the automatic bid to the 2006 NCAA Division I baseball tournament.

== Seeding and format ==
The top six finishers from the regular season were seeded one through six. They played a double-elimination tournament.

Team	W	L	T	Pct	Seed
McNeese State	22	8	.733	—	1
Texas State	20	10	.667	2	2
UTSA	20	10	.667	2	3
Lamar	19	11	.633	3	4
Texas–Arlington	16	12	.571	5	5
Northwestern State	15	15	.500	7	6
Southeastern Louisiana	14	16	.467	8	—
Louisiana–Monroe	12	16	.429	9	—
Sam Houston State	12	18	.400	10	—
Nicholls State	7	23	.233	15	—
Stephen F. Austin	6	24	.200	16	—

== Bracket and results ==
First round
1	McNeese State	1
6	Northwestern State	9
3	UTSA	5
4	Lamar	6^{11}
2	Texas State	9
5	Texas–Arlington	3

Second round
6	Northwestern State	0
3	UTSA	10
1	McNeese State	1
5	Texas–Arlington	5
4	Lamar	7
2	Texas State	6
6	Northwestern State	9
2	Texas State	1

Third round
1	UTSA	1
5	Texas–Arlington	2
4	Lamar	1
6	Northwestern State	11

Semifinals
5	Texas–Arlington	8^{11}
4	Lamar	7

Final
5	Texas–Arlington	8
6	Northwestern State	2

== All-Tournament Team ==
The following players were named to the All-Tournament Team.

Pos.	Name	School
P	Brandon Endsley	Texas–Arlington
P	Ryan Riddle	Texas–Arlington
C	Adam Moore	Texas–Arlington
1B	Robby Winn	Texas–Arlington
2B	Brandon Morgan	Northwestern State
3B	Miles Durham	Northwestern State
SS	Kyle Rudy	Texas–Arlington
OF	Collin DeLome	Lamar
OF	Michael Palermo	Northwestern State
OF	Luke Cannon	Texas State
DH	Will Henderson	Lamar

=== Most Valuable Player ===
Ryan Riddle was named Tournament Most Valuable Player. Riddle was a pitcher for Texas–Arlington.
