= 2004 Southland Conference baseball tournament =

- Teams: 6
- Format: Double-elimination
- Finals site: Alumni Field; Hammond, Louisiana
- Champions: Lamar (2nd title)
- Winning coach: Jim Gilligan (2nd title)
- MVP: Jordan Foster (Lamar)

2004 Southland Conference baseball standings
	Conf.						Overall
Team	W		L		T	PCT	W		L		T	PCT
Lamar ‍†‍‡‍^{y}	18	–	8	–	0	.692	41	–	16	–	0	.719
Northwestern State ‍‍‍	16	–	9	–	0	.640	33	–	23	–	0	.589
Texas State ‍‍‍	16	–	10	–	0	.615	32	–	26	–	0	.552
Texas–Arlington ‍‍‍	14	–	13	–	0	.519	32	–	26	–	0	.552
Louisiana–Monroe ‍‍‍	12	–	14	–	0	.462	30	–	28	–	0	.517
Texas–San Antonio ‍‍‍	12	–	14	–	0	.462	27	–	31	–	0	.466
Sam Houston State ‍‍‍	11	–	14	–	0	.440	19	–	30	–	1	.390
McNeese State ‍‍‍	11	–	16	–	0	.407	24	–	29	–	0	.453
Southeastern Louisiana ‍‍‍	11	–	16	–	0	.407	17	–	39	–	0	.304
Nicholls State ‍‍‍	9	–	16	–	0	.360	20	–	29	–	0	.408
† – Conference champion ‡ – Tournament champion y – Invited to the NCAA tournament As of June 30, 2004; Rankings from Collegiate Baseball

The 2004 Southland Conference baseball tournament was held from May 26 through 29, 2004 to determine the champion of the Southland Conference in the sport of college baseball for the 2004 season. The event pitted the top six finishers from the conference's regular season in a double-elimination tournament held at Alumni Field, home field of Southeastern Louisiana in Hammond, Louisiana. Top-seeded Lamar won their second overall championship and claimed the automatic bid to the 2004 NCAA Division I baseball tournament.

== Seeding and format ==
The top six finishers from the regular season were seeded one through six. They played a double-elimination tournament.

Team	W	L	T	Pct	Seed
Lamar	18	8	.692	—	1
Northwestern State	16	9	.640	1.5	2
Texas State	16	10	.615	2	3
Texas–Arlington	14	13	.519	4.5	4
Louisiana–Monroe	12	14	.462	6	5
UTSA	12	14	.462	6	6
Sam Houston State	11	14	.440	6.5	—
McNeese State	11	16	.407	7.5	—
Southeastern Louisiana	11	16	.407	7.5	—
Nicholls State	9	16	.360	8.5	—

== Bracket and results ==
First round
1	Lamar	11
6	UTSA	6
3	Texas State	7
4	Texas–Arlington	9
2	Northwestern State	11
5	Louisiana–Monroe	5

Second round
1	Lamar	8
3	Texas State	1
4	Texas–Arlington	3
2	Northwestern State	8
6	UTSA	4
5	Louisiana–Monroe	13

Third round
1	Lamar	5
2	Northwestern State	1
4	Texas–Arlington	5
5	Louisiana–Monroe	6

Semifinals
2	Northwestern State	1
5	Louisiana–Monroe	3

Final
1	Lamar	9	—
5	Louisiana–Monroe	3	—

== All-Tournament Team ==
The following players were named to the All-Tournament Team.

Pos.	Name	School
P	Derrick Gordon	Lamar
P	Kyle Stutes	Lamar
C	Michael Ambort	Lamar
1B	Mark Cooper	Texas State
2B	Ty Rollinson	Louisiana–Monroe
3B	Lane LaBorde	Louisiana–Monroe
SS	Chase Richards	Lamar
OF	Rocky Craigen	Lamar
OF	Glenn Jackson	Louisiana–Monroe
OF	Jordan Foster	Lamar
DH	John Allen	Lamar

=== Most Valuable Player ===
Jordan Foster was named Tournament Most Valuable Player. Foster was an outfielder for Lamar.
