= Vincent–Beck Stadium =

Ballpark in Beaumont, Texas, US

- The Beck
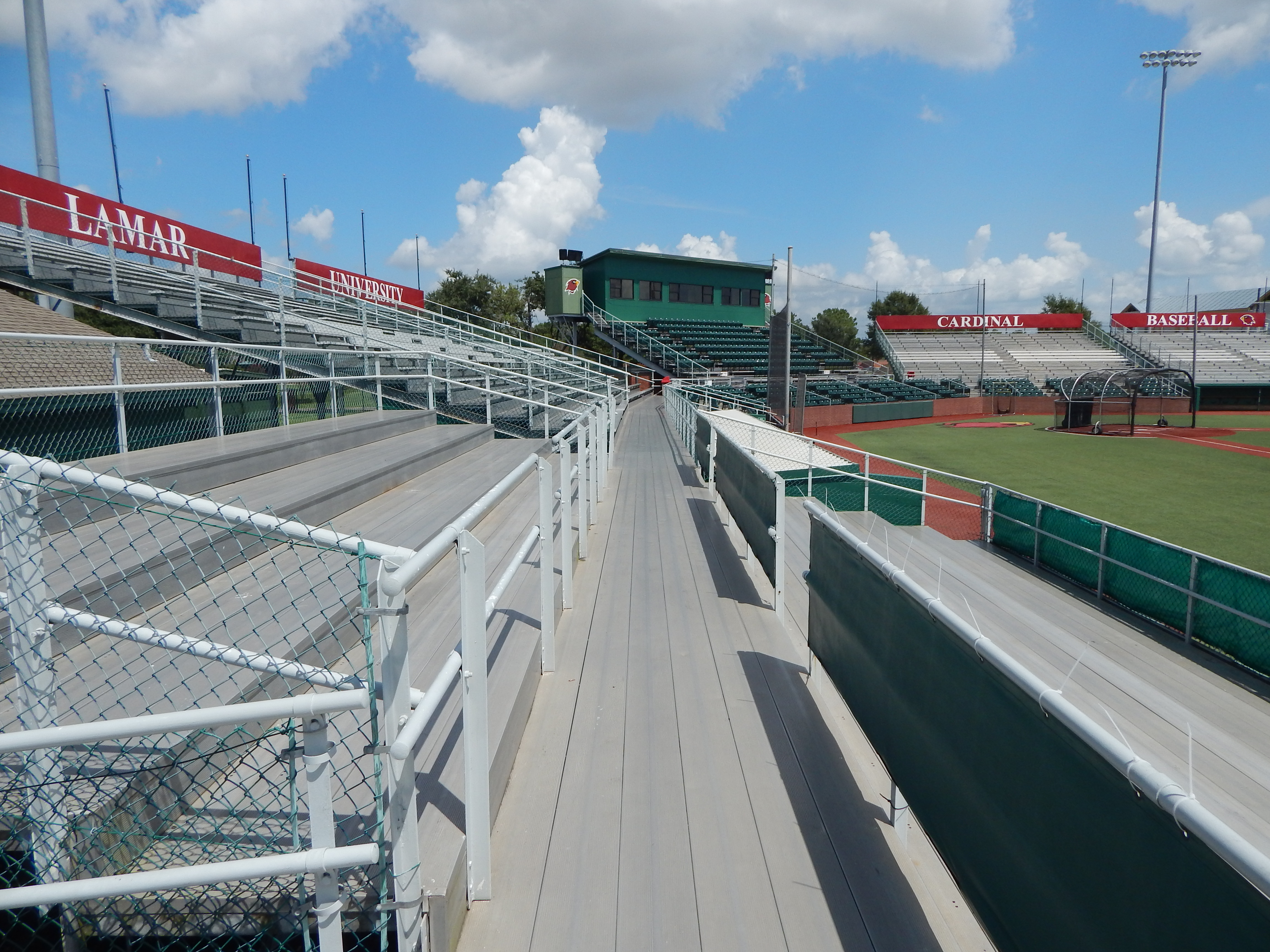
- Interactive map of Vincent–Beck Stadium
- Former names: Cardinal Field (1969–1981)
- Location: Jim Gilligan Way, Beaumont, TX 77705
- Coordinates: 30°02′05.8″N 94°04′30″W
- Owner: Lamar University
- Operator: Lamar University
- Seating type: 700 chairback seats 2,800 bleacher seats
- Capacity: 3,500
- Surface: Infield – Hellas Fusion Triple Play (2019–); Olympia Turf (2008–2018); Natural Grass (1969–2007); Outfield – Hellas Fusion XP^{2} (2019–); Natural Grass (1969–2018)
- Scoreboard: Electronic with video screen
- Record attendance: 3,563 vs LSU (February 24, 2016): Attendance only available from 1991 season forward
- Field size: Left Field: 325 ft (99 m); Left Center: 370 ft (113 m); Center Field: 380 ft (116 m); Right Center 370 ft (113 m); Right Field: 325 ft (99 m)
- Field shape: Symmetrical
- Public transit: (BMT) Virginia and Rolfe Christopher

Construction
- Opened: 1969
- Renovated: Minor Renovations: 1990, 1998, 2000, 2001, 2003, 2018–2019; Major Renovations: 2006, 2010
- Expanded: 1981, 1982 – 1983 (seats added for Beaumont Golden Gators minor league team)

Tenants
- Lamar Cardinals (NCAA) (1969–present); Beaumont Golden Gators (TL) (1983–1986); Beaumont Bullfrogs (CBL) (1994); Beaumont Oil Barons (MAL) (2026-present)

Vincent–Beck Stadium (formerly Cardinal Field) is a ballpark located in Beaumont, Texas, on Jim Gilligan Way on the campus of Lamar University. The stadium was built in 1969 and has a current capacity of 3,500 spectators. It is the home stadium of the Lamar Cardinals baseball team as well as the Beaumont Golden Gators, a minor league Double-A Texas League affiliate of the San Diego Padres (1983–1986) as well as the Beaumont Bullfrogs of the Central Baseball League (1994). The facility is named after former Major League Baseball coach Al Vincent and Bryan Beck, a former member of the Lamar University board of regents.

The ballpark hosted the Sun Belt Conference baseball tournament in 1993 and the Southland Conference baseball tournament in 2001, 2002, and 2006.

As the 2015 season began, the Cardinals had a 900-436–4 win–loss record at Vincent–Beck Stadium for a 67.3% winning record.

The stadium has been expanded several times and has had numerous renovations over its existence. Ground breaking for installation of new turf at the stadium was held on October 22, 2018. The project was completed in January, 2019. Infield turf is Hellas Construction Fusion Triple play. Outfield turf is Hellas Construction Fusion XP^{2}. Estimated cost for the project is $1.5 million. Other improvements in 2019 were concentrated on the dugouts. Protective netting was installed, and dugout drainage was improved.

== Features ==
The stadium includes the following:

- Lighting for night games
- Twenty foot tall batter's eye in center field
- Three foot brick wall extending from dugout to dugout behind home plate
- Dugouts
- Pressbox with two radio broadcast booths and additional media working space
- 700 chairback seats and total permanent capacity of 3,500
- Locker Rooms including 35 custom built oak lockers
- Players Lounge
- All weather batting cages
- Hellas Fusion turf - Infield (Fusion XP) and Outfield (Fusion XP^{2})
- 9,600 sq ft Indoor Practice Facility

== Recovery from Hurricane Rita ==
Vincent–Beck Stadium was severely damaged by Hurricane Rita in 2005. The following repairs and enhancements were made to the stadium before and during the 2006 baseball season.

- Replace press box – press box had been blown off its supports and was damaged
- Replace outfield fences – Fences were blown down
- Replace field lights
- Replace score board – new scoreboard was an enhancement and included a small video board
- Replace seats

On January 9, 2007, the Federal Emergency Management Agency awarded Lamar University $1.1 million to help with the uninsured portion of the loss.

== Attendance ==
=== Top ten attendance ===
Date	Opponent	Attendance
Top Ten Single Game Crowds
February 24, 2016	LSU	3,563
March 16, 2004	Texas A&M	3,416
March 28, 1998	Western Kentucky	3,306
March 30, 1994	LSU	3,079
March 22, 1992	Texas	2,523
March 3, 2023	Penn	2,014
April 20, 2022	Houston Baptist	1,923
April 8, 2009	Rice	1,845
March 22, 2011	Rice	1,827
March 10, 1999	Rice	1,820

- Note: Attendance is limited to 1991 season forward. Attendance is not available for earlier seasons.

=== Yearly attendance ===
Below is a list of the attendance by year from the 1991 season forward.

Season	Average	High	High Opponent
Yearly Attendance
2023	1,351	2,014	Penn
2022	1,097	1,923	Houston Baptist
2021	668	1,202	Houston
2020	799*	987*	Akron
2019	748	1,091	BYU
2018	524	1,111	McNeese
2017	524	1,122	Illinois, Milwaukee
2016	818	3,563	LSU
2015	724	1,032	Illinois, New Mexico State
2014	763	1,252	New Orleans
2013	645	1,039	Nicholls
2012	820	1,727	Rice
2011	856	1,827	Rice
2010	526	1,113	Rice
2009	515	1,845	Rice
2008	450	706	Louisiana–Lafayette
2007	484	1,312	Rice
2006	548	1,054	Texas A&M
2005	641	1,564	Rice
2004	696	3,416	Texas A&M
2003	599	1,549	Texas–Arlington
2002	497	1,262	McNeese State
2001	466	1,479	Texas–Arlington
2000	494	1,628	Rice
1999	527	1,820	Rice
1998	352	3,306	Western Kentucky
1997	571	1,103	Rice
1996	511	1,648	Texas A&M
1995	437	832	Texas State
1994	758	3,079	LSU
1993	697	1,706	Arkansas State
1992	378	2,523	Texas
1991	212	1,134	Sam Houston State

- Note: Games scheduled after March 11, 2020, cancelled due to COVID-19 precautions.

As of the 2023 season.

== Photo gallery ==
Views from Vincent-Beck Stadium
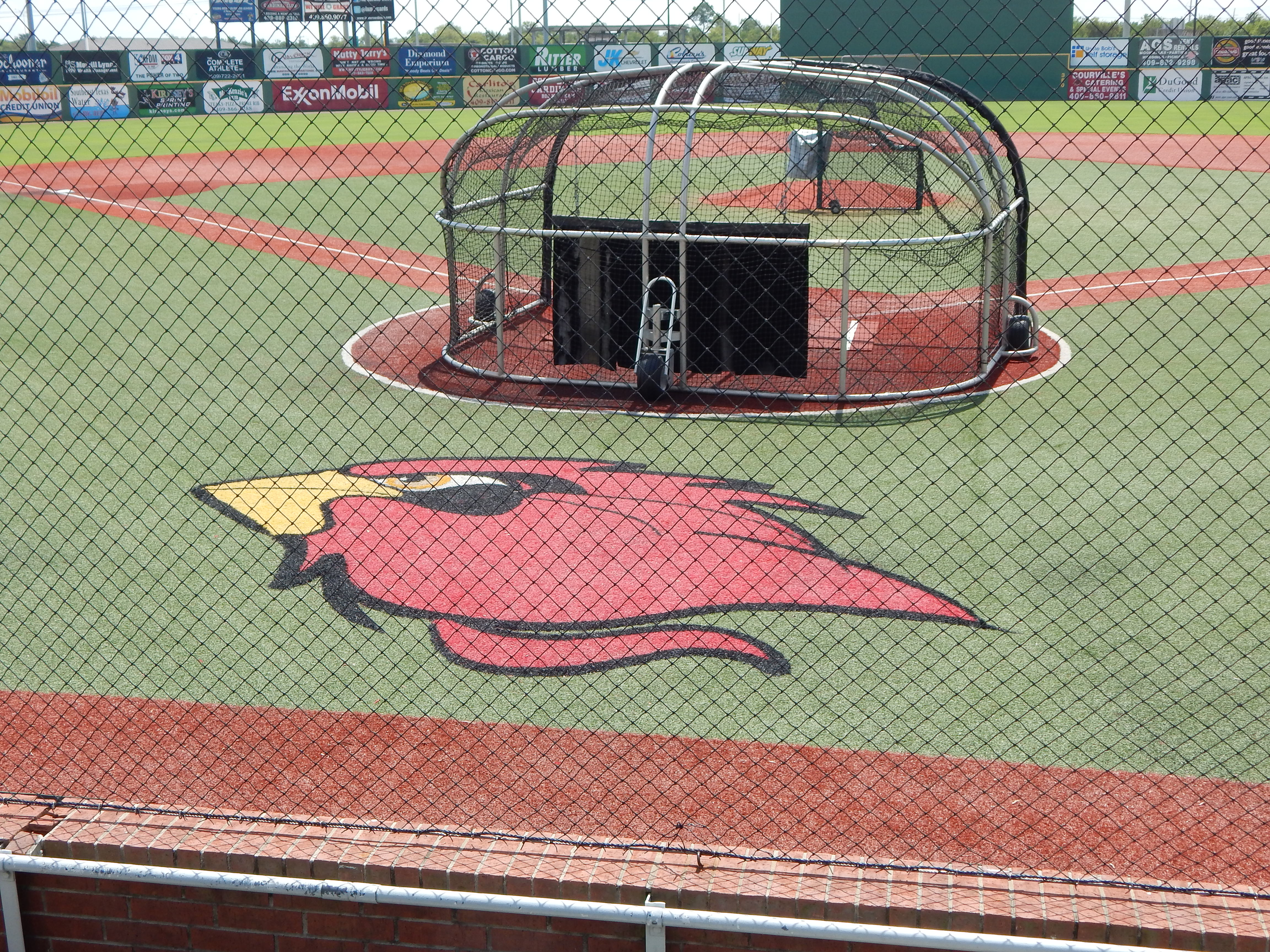
Infield and batter's cage

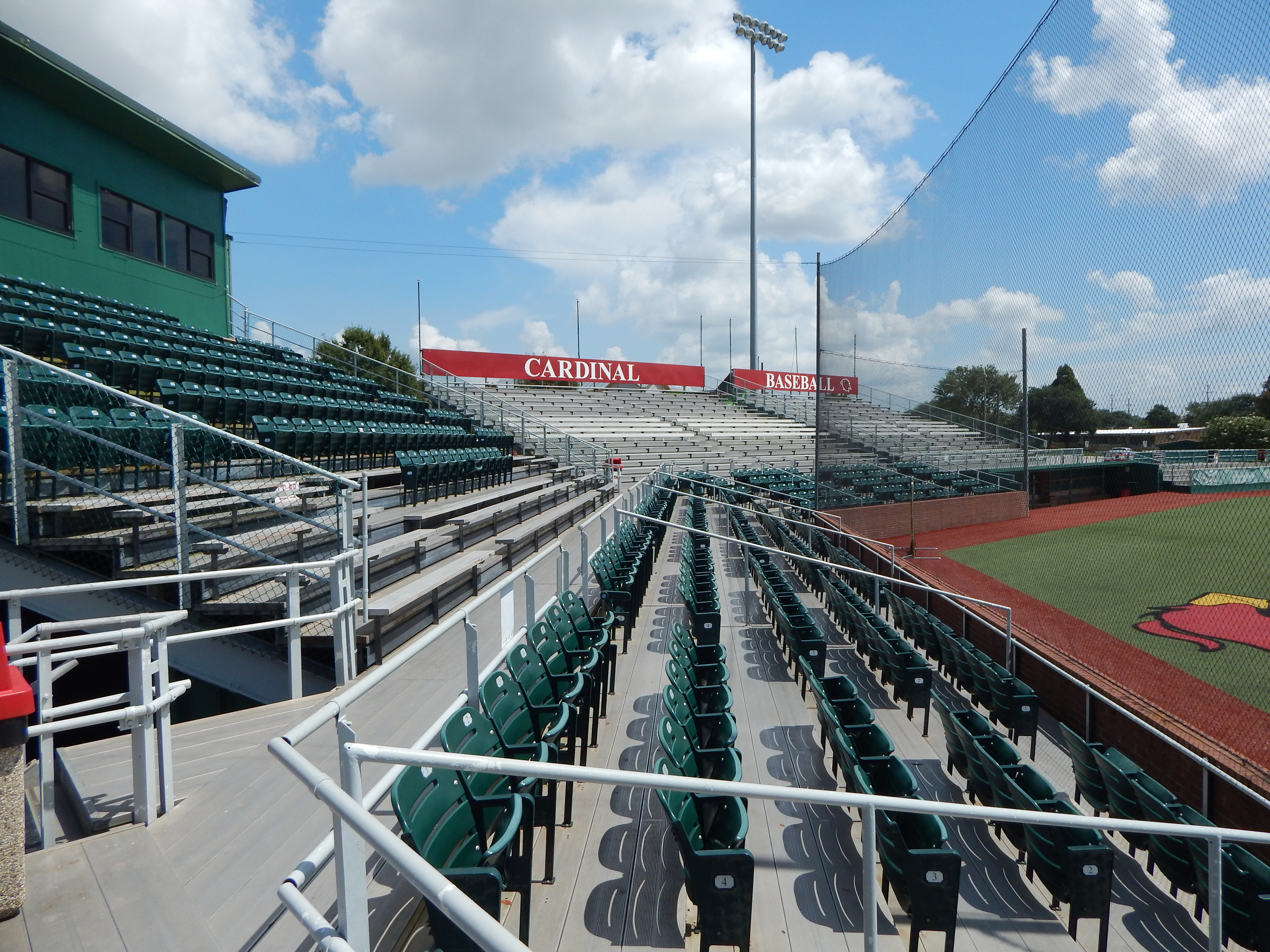
Chair back seating

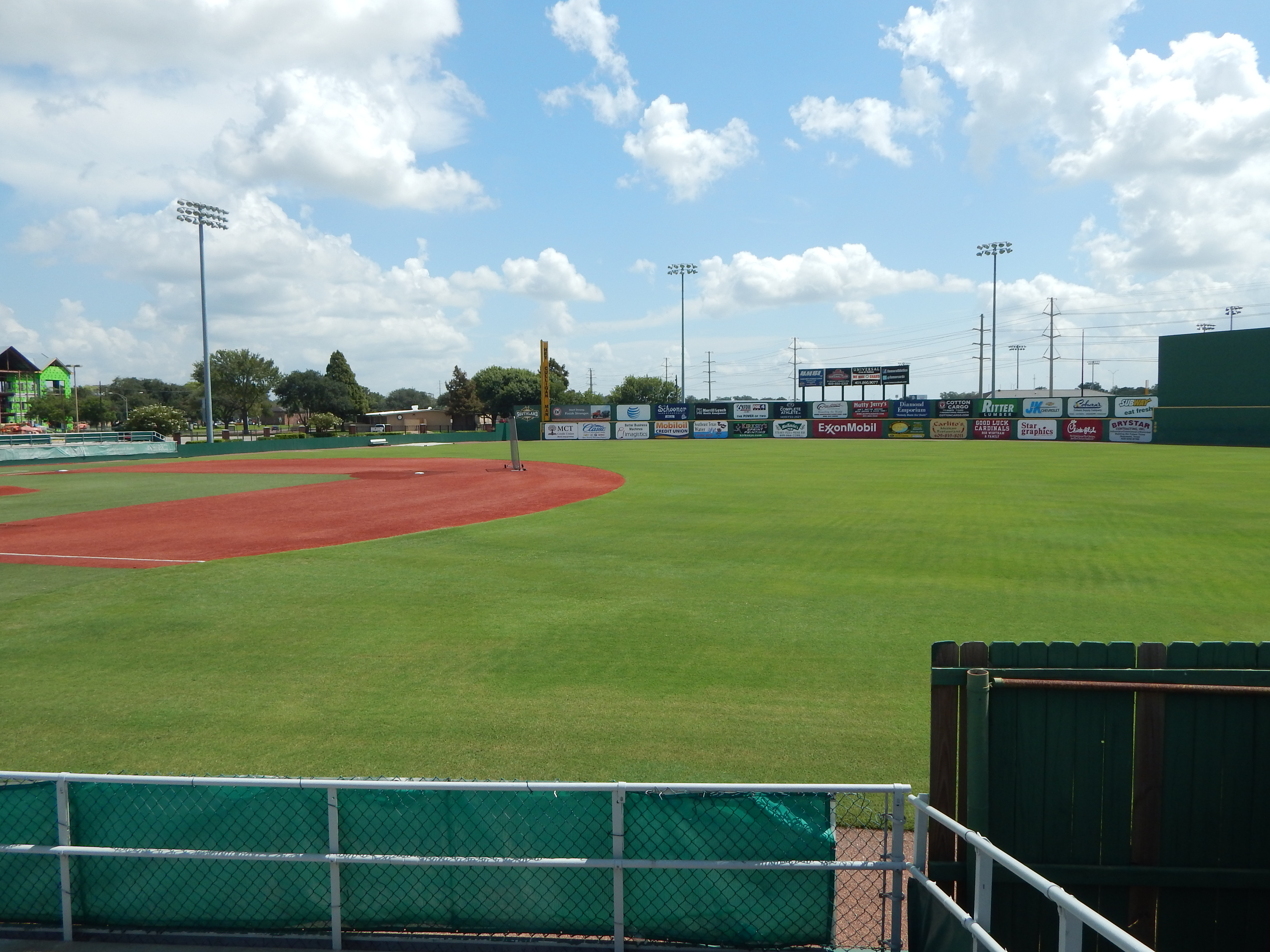
Playing field from the right field seats

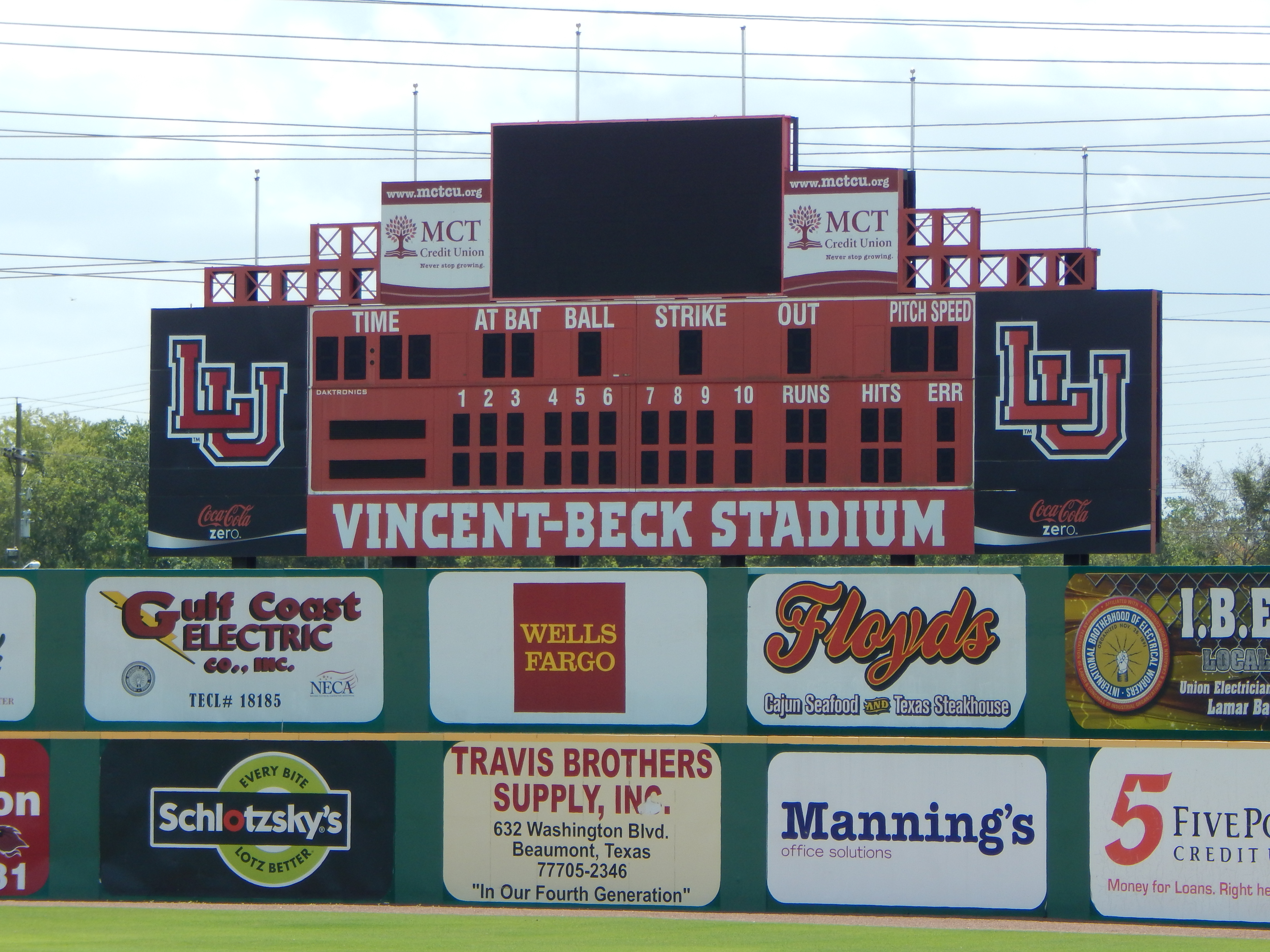
Vincent-Beck Stadium scoreboard

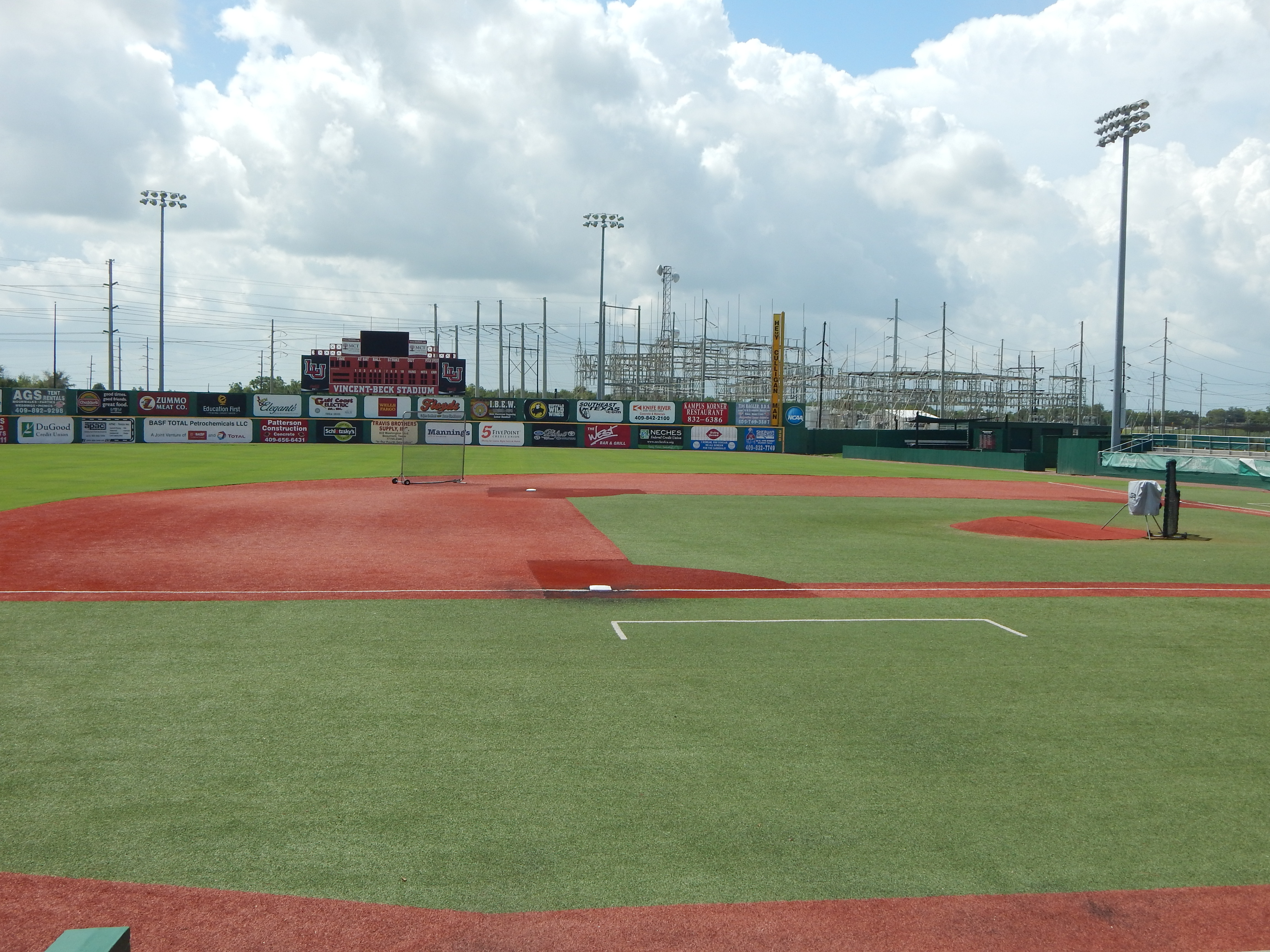
Playing field from the left field seats

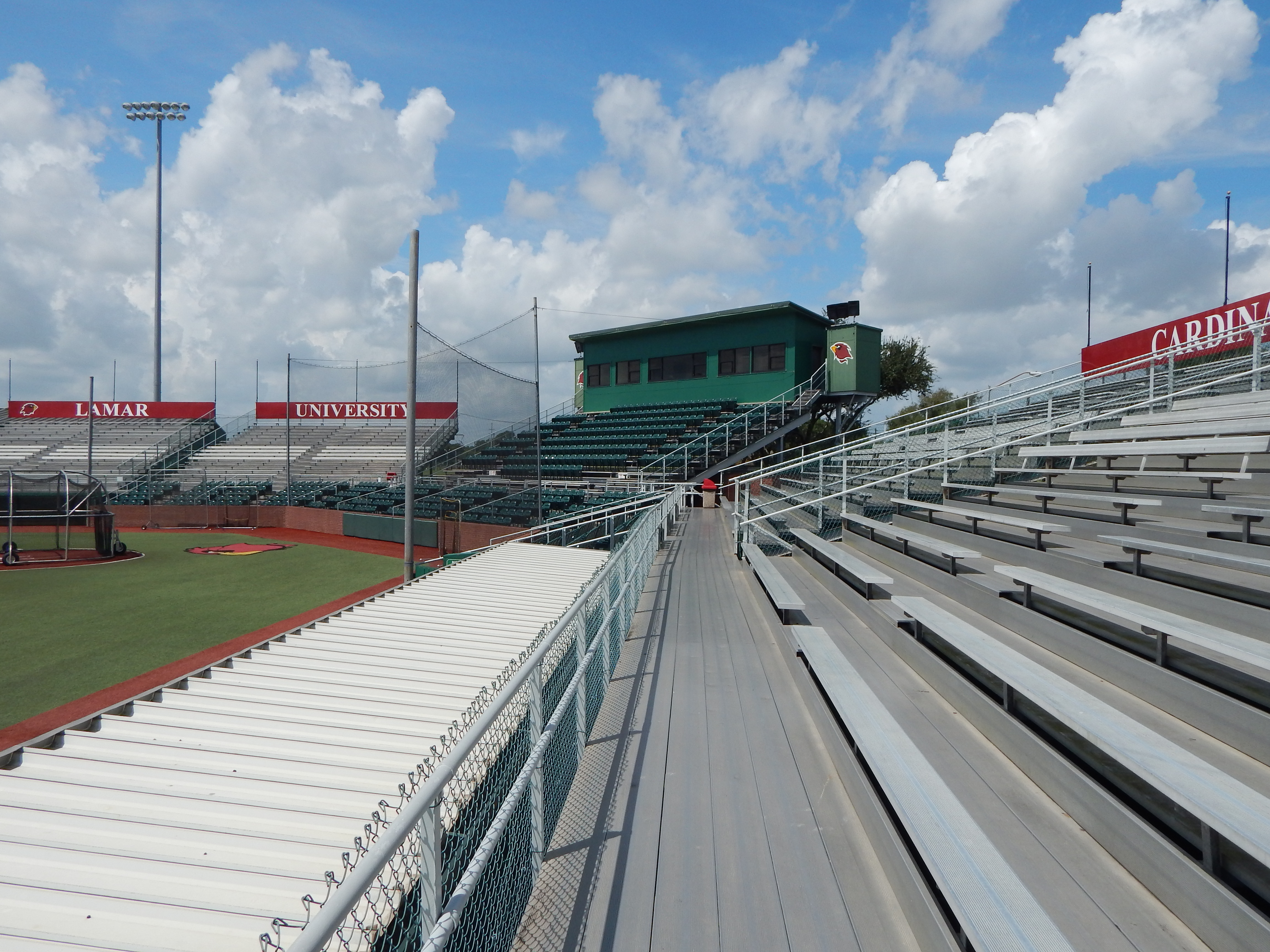
Looking toward the press box

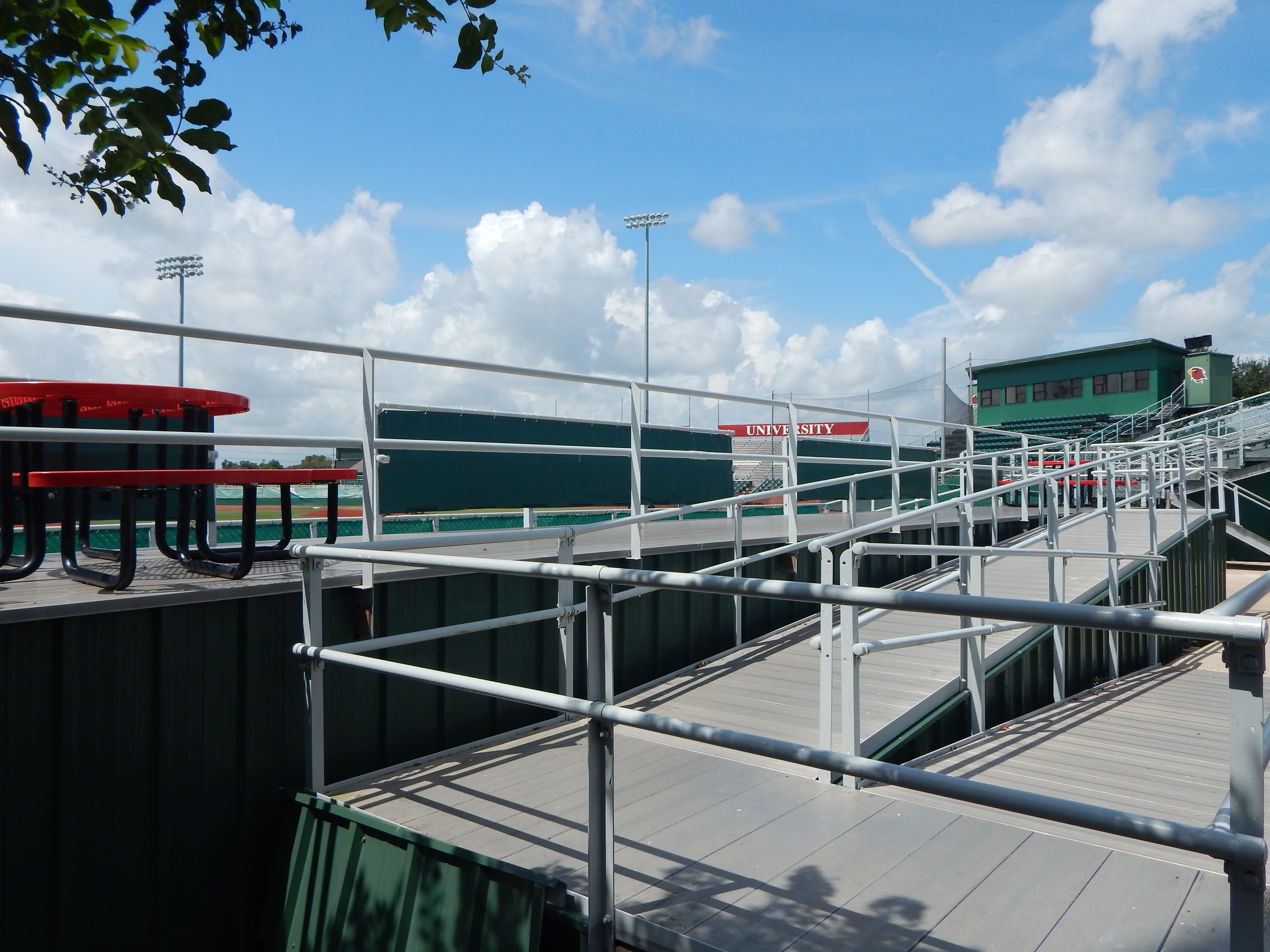
Ramp to left field line deck

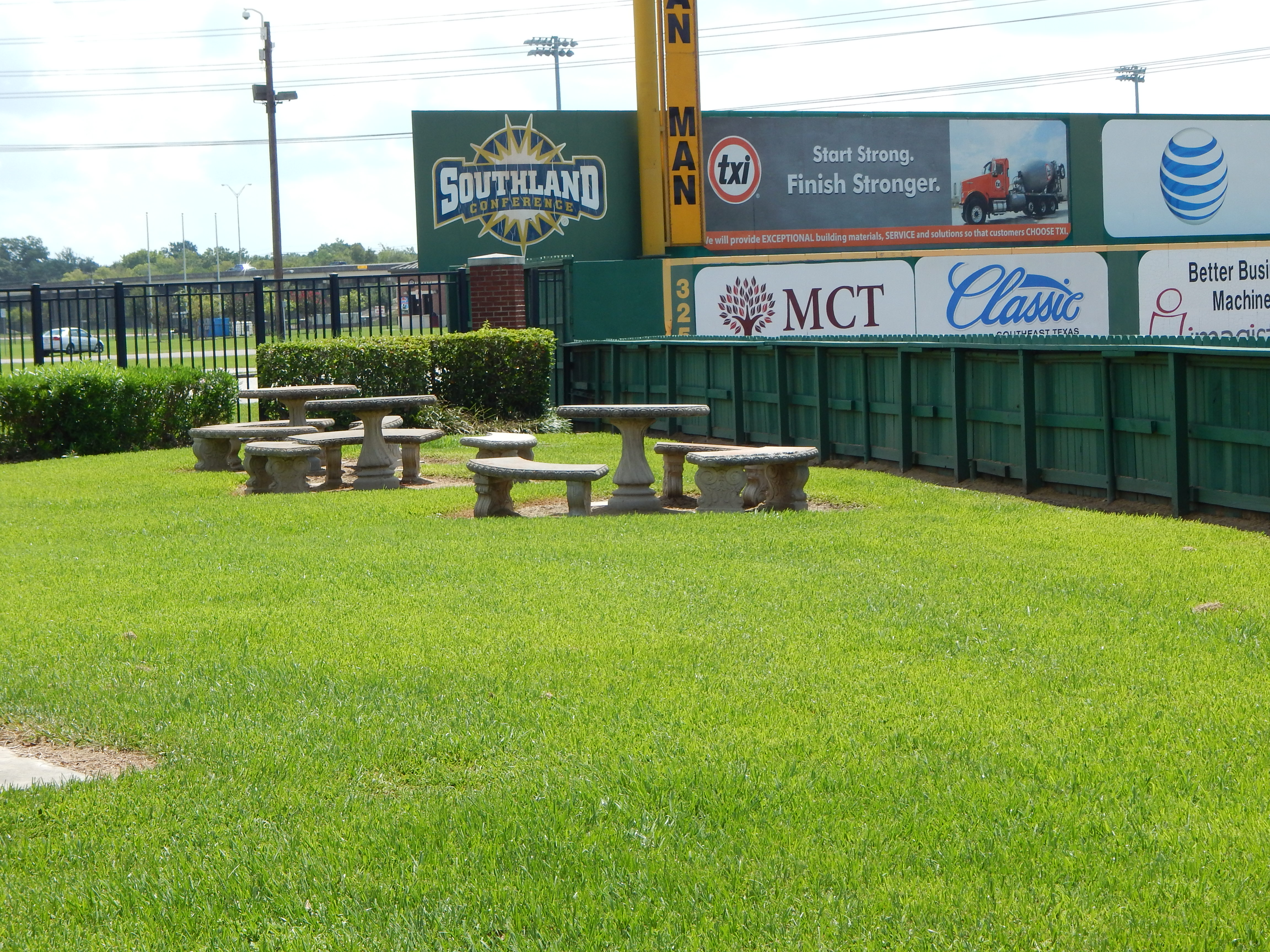
Picnic area along the left field line

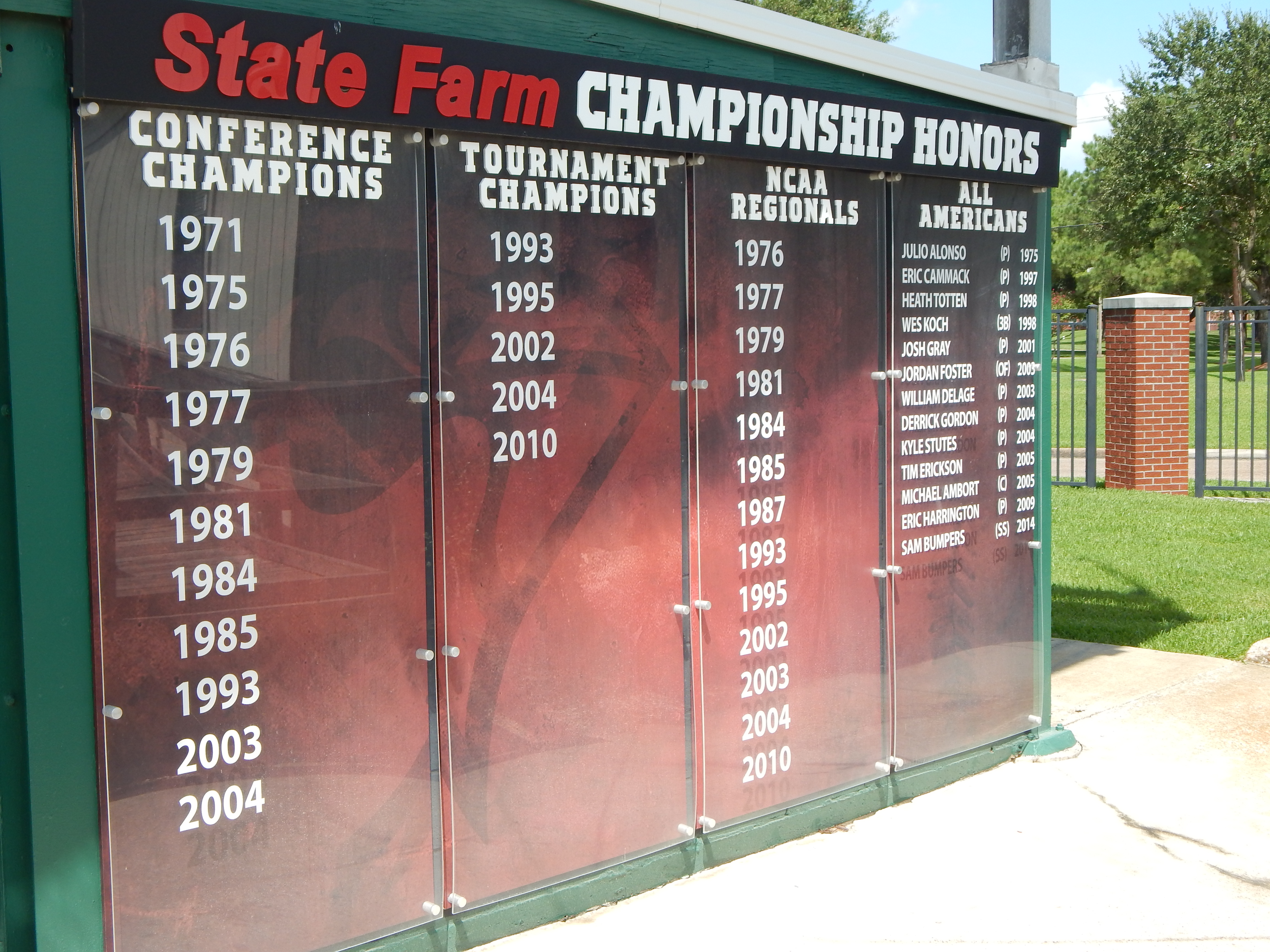
Championship honors board at the stadium

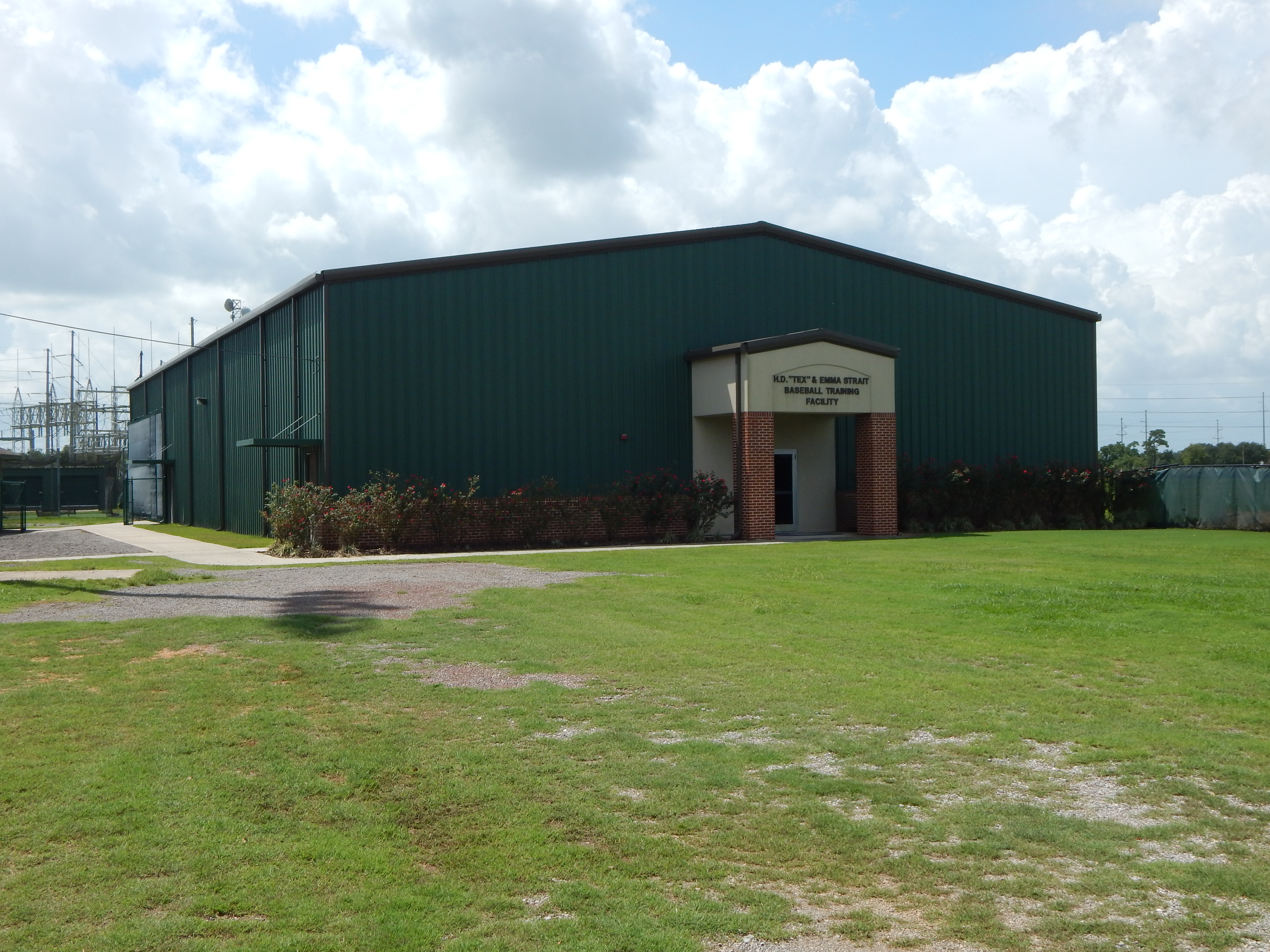
9,600 sq ft indoor training facility

== See also ==
- List of NCAA Division I baseball venues
