= Whataburger Field =

Baseball stadium in Corpus Christi, Texas, US

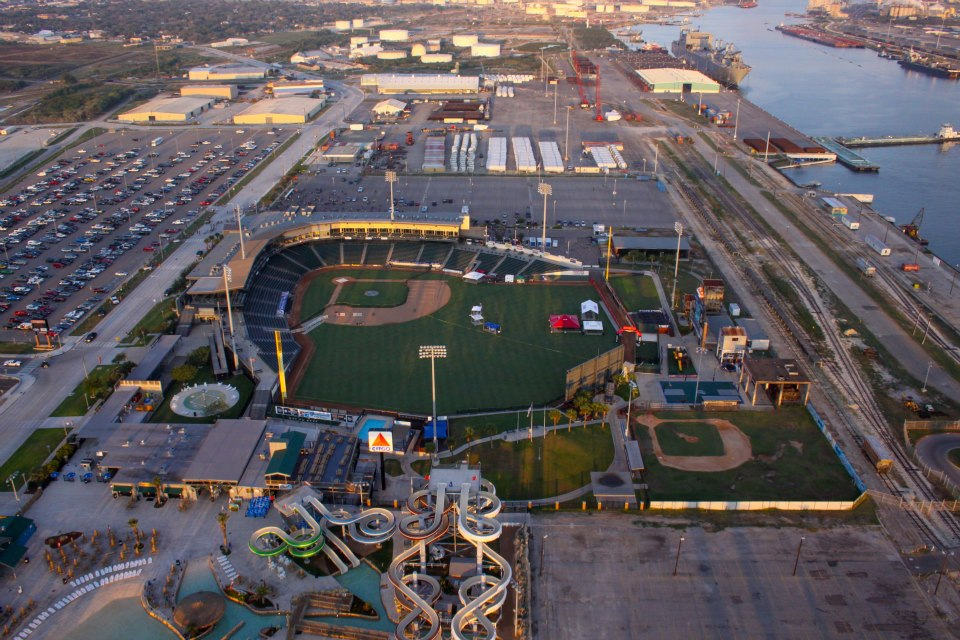

- Location within Texas Location within the United States
- Location: 734 East Port Avenue; Corpus Christi, Texas; United States
- Coordinates: 27°48′34.5″N 97°23′58.9″W
- Owner: City of Corpus Christi
- Operator: Corpus Christi Baseball Club LP
- Capacity: 7,679 (5,679 seats plus 2,000 in berms)
- Surface: Grass
- Field size: Left field – 315 feet (96 m); Left-center – 375 feet (114 m); Center field – 400 feet (122 m); Right-center – 375 feet (114 m); Right field – 325 feet (99 m)

Construction
- Groundbreaking: April 8, 2004
- Opened: April 17, 2005
- Cost: US$27.7 million ($45.7 million in 2025 dollars)
- Architects: HKS, Inc., WKMC Architects, Inc. (associate)
- Project manager: AG/CM Inc.
- Structural engineer: Kleinfelder
- Services engineers: Blum Consulting Engineers, Inc.
- General contractor: Fulton-Coastcon-Hunt

Tenant
- Corpus Christi Hooks (TL) 2005–present

Whataburger Field is a minor league baseball stadium located in Corpus Christi, Texas, United States. It is home to the Corpus Christi Hooks, the Double-A affiliate of the Houston Astros. It also serves as a secondary home to the Texas A&M–Corpus Christi Islanders college baseball team in addition to their own on-campus Chapman Field. The field has been around for over 21 years and it continues to grow and expand in ways to attract more people. to watch what they love. The field has had baseball players such as Walker Janek who is a member of the Corpus Christi Hooks.

== History ==
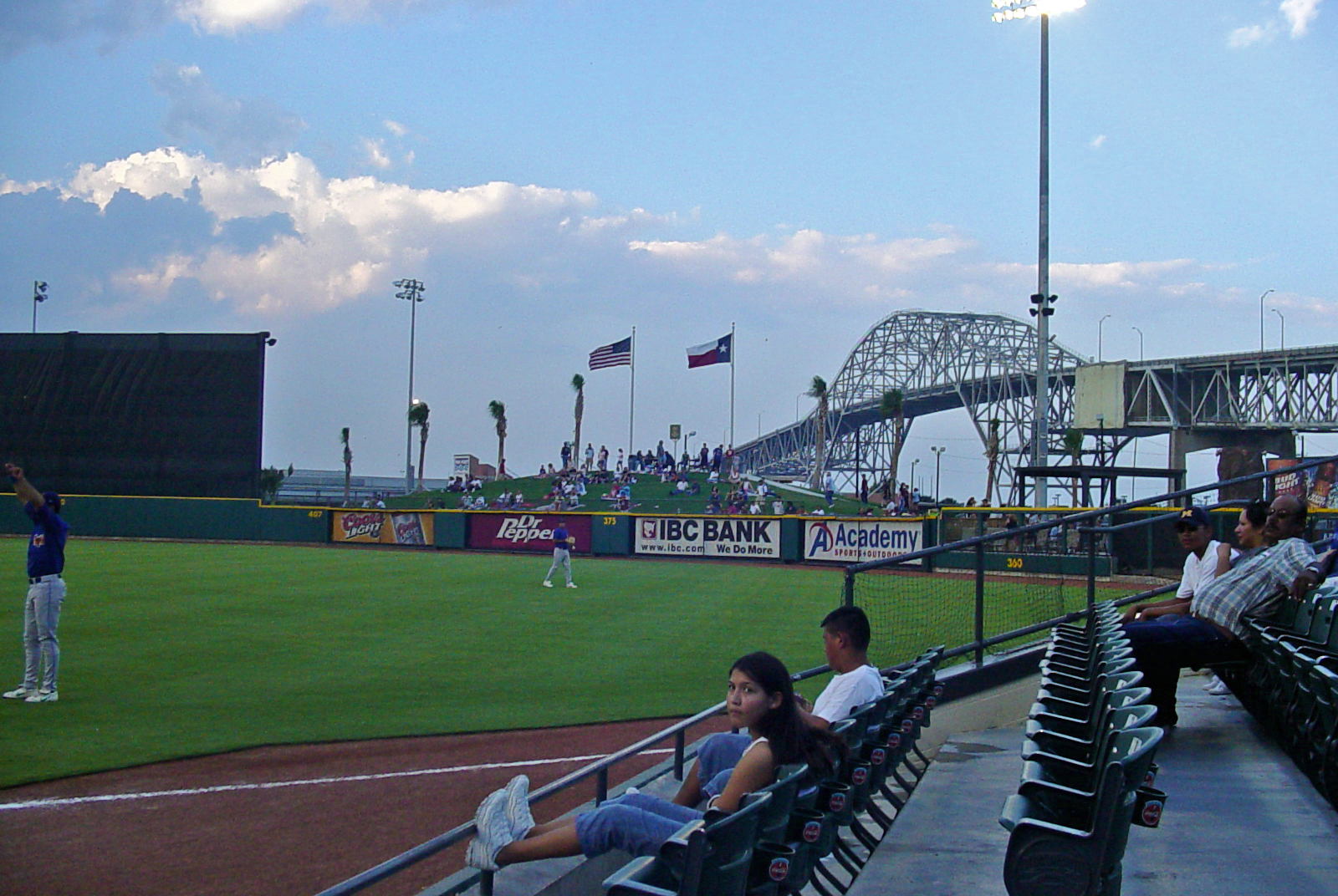
Corpus Christi Harbor Bridge as formerly viewed beyond the right field wall

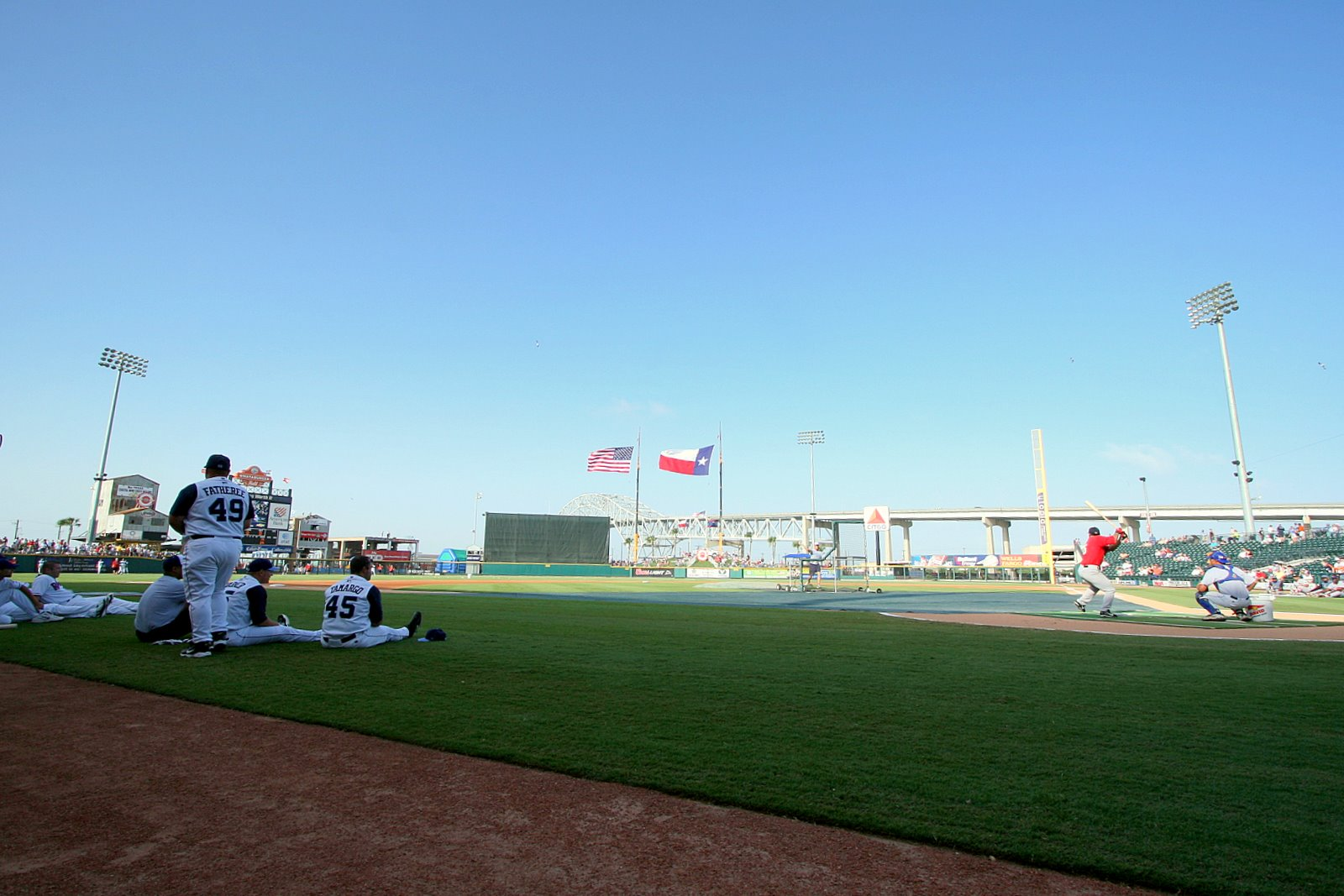
The 2007 Texas League Home Run Derby at Whataburger Field

The park, which opened in 2005, is located on what used to be old cotton warehouses on the city's waterfront. Naming rights were paid for by Whataburger, Inc., which was headquartered in Corpus Christi before relocating to San Antonio in 2009. The USS Lexington and the Texas State Aquarium are visible from inside the park. As of 2019, Whataburger Field features 5,679 fixed seats, 19 luxury suites and two outfield berm areas that are able to accommodate approximately 2,000 people.

Whataburger Field's first official game was played against the Midland RockHounds on April 17, 2005. An 11-year-old Corpus Christi native named Mark Travis was the first fan to enter the stadium.

On June 30, 2005, the stadium unveiled For the Love of the Game, an 18-foot (5.5 m) statue depicting a young ballplayer in a contemplative pose. The statue is believed to be the largest bronze statue of a baseball player.

A pair of 1920s-era cotton presses border the videoboard in left field. Under a set of broken windows on the lefthand building, a sign reads "Bam-Bam" to commemorate a batting practice blast by Hooks outfielder Hunter Pence in 2006 that smashed one of the windows. Pence earned the nickname Bam-Bam because of his antics and similarities to the baby of the same name on The Flintstones.

On June 26, 2007, Whataburger Field played host to the 2007 Texas League All-Star game.

The Southland Conference baseball tournament was played at Whataburger Field in 2009 and 2010. The conference tournament was scheduled to return to the facility in 2020, but was cancelled due to the COVID-19 pandemic.

On June 10, 2010, the Houston Dynamo played the first-ever soccer match at Whataburger Field before a capacity crowd of 6,111, beating the Laredo Heat 2–1. The Dynamo played in-state rival FC Dallas in a pre-season friendly on February 12, 2011 — becoming the second soccer match ever played at the stadium.

Prior to the 2019 season, the Hooks and Whataburger renewed their naming rights agreement for a period of 15 years and announced a slew of changes. The roof of was painted with distinctive orange and white stripes, paying homage to the iconic pattern found at Whataburger restaurants and the private drive bordering the west side of the stadium was renamed Whataburger Way. As part of a ticket package, Whataburger 4Topps were added to the top of section 120, providing fans with the opportunity to dine at Whataburger-branded tables with adjoining 360-degree swivel chairs and Whataburger wait service.

During a pregame ceremony on September 1, 2019, the Hooks announced plans to name the stadium entrance Ken Schrom Plaza, honoring their retiring longtime front office executive and president who was notorious for greeting fans at that very plaza before and after games.

Whataburger Field and the Hooks hosted the Astros' Alternate Training Site (ATS) during the shortened 2020 Major League Baseball season and the beginning of the 2021 MLB season. From April 12–14, 2021, it hosted a three-game exhibition series between the Astros' ATS and the Texas Rangers' ATS with entry limited to season ticket holders, marking the first professional baseball games at the stadium with fans since 2019.

Spanning from left to center field and beyond, Whataburger Field offers fans views of the New Harbor Bridge, which opened for traffic in May 2025. It is lighted with changing LED lights at night.

For its first 20 years of existence, spanning from right to center field and beyond, Whataburger Field offered fans views of Corpus Christi Harbor Bridge, which displayed changing LED lights at night. A public lighting ceremony was held at the stadium on December 4, 2011. The bridge has been fully dismantled and no trace remains as of May 2026.

== Amenities ==
- Mike Shaw Automotive Line Drive Loft
- Bud Light Bullpen and Kieshnick's Korner
- Physician's Premier Power Deck
- Conviva 4Topp Tables
- Whataburger 4Topp Tables
- Yuengling Flight Zone
- gtek360 Terrace
- Goodwill Zone
- Kids Zone
- Sport Court basketball playing surface
- Daktronics 21 ft (6.4 m) tall x 48 ft (15 m) wide videoboard, unveiled in 2014
- Pool & Spa
- CITGO Cotton Club – an air-conditioned entertainment area redesigned prior to the 2019 season. The club area provides sweeping views of the field, Harbor Bridge and the downtown Corpus Christi skyline.

== Food ==
- A Whataburger restaurant
- Nolan Ryan's Seven-34 Smoke House
- Tenders, Love, & Chicken
- Valero Champions Club bar with food service
- Live Oak Bar
- Dippin' Dots

== See also ==
- List of NCAA Division I baseball venues
