= Mark Johnson (baseball coach) =

American baseball coach

Biographical details
- Education: University of New Mexico

Playing career
- 1964–1967: New Mexico
- 1967–1969: New York Mets (minor leagues)

Coaching career (HC unless noted)
- 1969–1971 1971–1976 1976–1982 1982–1984 1985–2005 2007–2011: New Mexico (Asst.) Arizona (Asst.) Mississippi State (Asst.) Texas A&M (Asst.) Texas A&M Sam Houston State

Head coaching record
- Overall: 1,042-562-3

Accomplishments and honors

Championships
- 3 Southwest Conference (1986, 1989, 1993); 2 Big 12 (1998, 1999); 3 SLC Tournament (2007, 2008, 2009); 2 CWS appearances (1993, 1999)

Awards
- 3x SWC Coach of the Year (1986, 1989, 1993); Big 12 Coach of the Year (1998, 1999); 4x ABCA Regional Coach of the Year (1986, 1993, 1998, 1999); Sporting News National Coach of the Year (1999); ABCA Hall of Fame Inductee (2001); Texas Baseball Hall of Fame Inductee (2002)

Mark Johnson is a Hall of Fame College Baseball Coach who coached the Texas A&M Aggies baseball team from 1985 to 2005 and Sam Houston State from 2007 to 2011. Johnson led the Aggies to the NCAA playoffs 13 times, College World Series appearances in 1993 and 1999, won the Big 12 Conference regular-season crown in 1998 and 1999, won the Southwest Conference championship three times (1986, 1989, 1993). Johnson retired with 1,043 career wins.

With Sam Houston State, he led the Bearkats to three Southland Conference baseball tournament championships and three NCAA Regional appearances in 5 years as head coach. Johnson coached his 1,000th career win during his fourth season with the Bearkats on March 8, 2010. He was the 44th head baseball coach to pass 1,000 career wins. In his first 4 years at Sam Houston, his Bearkats had set 26 school records, and also produced 7 Academic All-Southland players.
