= Stephen F. Austin Lumberjacks baseball =

- 2026 Stephen F. Austin Lumberjacks baseball team
- University: Stephen F. Austin State University
- Head coach: Matt Vanderburg (2nd season)
- Conference: Southland
- Location: Nacogdoches, Texas
- Home stadium: Jaycees Field at Pilgrim's Park (Capacity: 1,000)
- Nickname: Lumberjacks
- Colors: Purple and white

The Stephen F. Austin Lumberjacks baseball team is a varsity intercollegiate athletic team of Stephen F. Austin State University in Nacogdoches, Texas, United States. The team is a member of the Southland Conference (SLC), which is part of the National Collegiate Athletic Association's Division I. The team plays its home games at Jaycees Field in Nacogdoches, Texas. The Lumberjacks are coached by Matt Vanderburg. The team played in the SLC from 1988 to 1995 before discontinuing baseball until its return in 2006. They left the SLC in 2021 for the Western Athletic Conference. On July 1, 2024, SFA returned to the SLC.

== History ==
Hunter Dozier became the first Lumberjack selected in the first round of the Major League Baseball (MLB) Draft, when the Royals selected him eighth overall in the 2013 MLB draft.

== See also ==
- List of NCAA Division I baseball programs
