= UTSA Roadrunners baseball =

- 2026 UTSA Roadrunners baseball team
- Founded: 1992; 34 years ago
- Overall record: 757–761 (.499)
- University: University of Texas at San Antonio
- Athletic director: Lisa Campos
- Head coach: Patrick Hallmark (7th season)
- Conference: The American
- Location: San Antonio, Texas
- Home stadium: Roadrunner Field (capacity: 800)
- Nickname: Roadrunners
- Colors: Navy blue, orange, and white

NCAA regional champions
- 2025

NCAA tournament appearances
- 1994, 2005, 2013, 2025

Conference tournament champions
- Southland: 1994, 2005; WAC: 2013

Conference regular season champions
- Southland: 2007, 2008; The American: 2025, 2026

The UTSA Roadrunners baseball team is the varsity intercollegiate baseball team representing University of Texas at San Antonio in NCAA Division I college baseball. The program is a member the West Division of the American Athletic Conference (The American). The program's home venue is Roadrunner Field. The team has appeared in the NCAA tournament four times, most recently in 2025.

== History ==
UTSA has competed in three conferences since the formation of the team in 1992, Southland Conference (1993-2012), Western Athletic Conference (2013), and now since 2014, Conference USA, winning two conference championships, three conference tournaments, and appearing in the NCAA tournament four times.

== UTSA in the NCAA Tournament ==
Year	Record	Pct	Notes
1994	0–2	.000	Central Regional
2005	0–2	.000	Waco Regional
2013	0–2	.000	Corvallis Regional
2025	3–2	.600	Los Angeles Super Regional
TOTALS	3–8	.273	

== Coaches ==
Only those who coached 3 or more seasons and 30 or more games.

Coach	Years	Overall	%	Conf	%						
Coach	Years	Overall	%	Conf	%	Jimmy Shankle	1992–1995	110–110	.500	34–34	.500
Mickey Lashley	1996–2000	113–160	.414	57–81	.413						
Sherman Corbett	2001–2012	353–329	.518	192–162	.542						
Jason Marshall	2013–2019	208–189	.524	100–102 (Note: Marshall's conference record is his WAC and CUSA record together. WAC (15–11) and CUSA (85–91))	.483						
Patrick Hallmark	2020–present	140–96	.593	71–46	.607						

== Yearly record ==
Record table
Season	Team	Overall	Conference	Standing	Postseason
Jimmy Shankle (Southland Conference) (1992–1995)
1992	Jimmy Shankle	19-35			
1993	Jimmy Shankle	21-34	9-15	7th	
1994	Jimmy Shankle	39-18	12-8	3rd	NCAA Regional
1995	Jimmy Shankle	31-23	13-11	5th	
Mickey Lashley (Southland Conference) (1996–2000)
1996	Mickey Lashley	26-26	17-13	3rd	Southland tournament
1997	Mickey Lashley	20-36	12-18	6th	Southland tournament
1998	Mickey Lashley	23-28	7-17	9th	
1999	Mickey Lashley	27-33	15-12	5th	Southland tournament
2000	Mickey Lashley	17-37	6-21	10th	
Sherman Corbett (Southland Conference) (2001–2012)
2001	Sherman Corbett	30-29	15-12	5th	Southland tournament
2002	Sherman Corbett	25-29	13-14	7th	
2003	Sherman Corbett	29-27	12-15	T-6th	
2004	Sherman Corbett	27-31	12-14	T-5th	Southland tournament
2005	Sherman Corbett	27-34	14-13	T-4th	NCAA Regional
2006	Sherman Corbett	37-22	20-10	T-2nd	Southland tournament
2007	Sherman Corbett	36-22	24-6	1st	Southland tournament
2008	Sherman Corbett	39-19	22-8	1st	Southland tournament
2009	Sherman Corbett	32-24	20-12	3rd	Southland tournament
2010	Sherman Corbett	22-28	13-20	9th	
2011	Sherman Corbett	27-32	16-17	6th	Southland tournament
2012	Sherman Corbett	22-32	11-21	12th	
Jason Marshall (Western Athletic Conference) (2013)
2013	Jason Marshall	35–25	15–11	4th	NCAA Regional
Jason Marshall (Conference USA) (2014–2019)
2014	Jason Marshall	35–25	16–14	T-6th	C-USA tournament
2015	Jason Marshall	32–23	17–13	5th	C-USA tournament
2016	Jason Marshall	17–34	8–20	11th	
2017	Jason Marshall	29–28	15–15	T-7th	C-USA tournament
2018	Jason Marshall	32–24	16–13	5th	C-USA tournament
2019	Jason Marshall	28–30	13–16	8th	C-USA tournament
Patrick Hallmark (Conference USA) (2020–2023)
2020	Patrick Hallmark	10–7	0–0		Season canceled due to COVID-19
2021	Patrick Hallmark	22–26	14–17	3rd (West)	C-USA tournament
2022	Patrick Hallmark	38–20	19–11	T–3rd	C-USA tournament
2023	Patrick Hallmark	38–19	21–8	2nd	C-USA tournament
Patrick Hallmark (American Athletic Conference) (2024–present)
2024	Patrick Hallmark	32–24	17–10	2nd	American Athletic Conference tournament
2025	Patrick Hallmark	47–13	20–4	1st	NCAA Super Regional
Total:		962–896			
National champion Postseason invitational champion Conference regular season champion Conference regular season and conference tournament champion Division regular season champion Division regular season and conference tournament champion Conference tournament champion
