= Northwestern State Demons baseball =

Northwestern State Demons
- 2026 Northwestern State Demons baseball team
- Founded: 1912
- University: Northwestern State University
- Head coach: Chris Bertrand (3rd season)
- Conference: Southland
- Location: Natchitoches, Louisiana
- Home stadium: H. Alvin Brown–C. C. Stroud Field (capacity: 1,200)
- Nickname: Demons
- Colors: Purple, white, and orange trim

NCAA tournament appearances
- 1967*, 1991, 1994, 2005, 2018

Conference tournament champions
- 2018

Conference regular season champions
- 1957*, 1967*, 1991, 1993, 1994, 1995, 1997, 1998, 2001, 2002, 2005 at Division I level

The Northwestern State Demons baseball team is a varsity intercollegiate athletic team of Northwestern State University in Natchitoches, Louisiana, United States. The team is a member of the Southland Conference, which is part of the National Collegiate Athletic Association's Division I. The team plays its home games at H. Alvin Brown–C. C. Stroud Field in Natchitoches, Louisiana. The Demons are currently coached by Chris Bertrand

== History ==
=== Northwestern State in the NCAA Tournament ===
Year	Record	Pct	Notes
1991	0–2	.000	South Regional
1994	1–2	.333	Midwest I Regional
2005	1–2	.333	Baton Rouge Regional
2018	1–2	.333	Corvallis Regional
TOTALS	3–8	.273	

=== Year-by-year results ===
Record table
Season	Coach	Overall	Conference	Standing	Postseason
Southland Conference (1990–present)
1990	Jim Wells	38–13	9–9		
1991	Jim Wells	40–21	13–5	SLC Champions	1991 NCAA Division I baseball tournament
1992	Jim Wells	29–26	8–13		
1993	Jim Wells	40–18	18–6	SLC Champions	
1994	Jim Wells	45–15	16–5	SLC Champions	1994 NCAA Division I baseball tournament
1995	Dave Van Horn	37–15	19–5	SLC Champions	
1996	Dave Van Horn	34–27	14–16		
1997	Dave Van Horn	35–23	19–9	SLC Champions	
1998	John Cohen	40–20	15–8	SLC Champions	
1999	John Cohen	38–21	18–9		
2000	John Cohen	30–26	14–13		
2001	John Cohen	38–17	19–8	SLC Champions	
2002	Mitch Gaspard	43–17	17–10	SLC Champions	
2003	Mitch Gaspard	35–22	16–11		
2004	Mitch Gaspard	33–23	16–9		
2005	Mitch Gaspard	41–20	22–5	SLC Champions	2005 NCAA Division I baseball tournament
2006	Mitch Gaspard	33–28	15–15		
2007	Mitch Gaspard	25–28	15–14		
2008	J. P. Davis	28–28	17–12		
2009	J. P. Davis	26–26	18–13		
2010	J. P. Davis	36–21	22–10		
2011	J. P. Davis	22–32	11–21		
2012	J. P. Davis	19–32	14–19		
2013	Lane Burroughs	16–40	5–22		
2014	Lane Burroughs	33–26	19–11		
2015	Lane Burroughs	31–23	20–8		
2016	Lane Burroughs	33–24	20–10		
2017	Bobby Barbier	20–34	10–20		
2018	Bobby Barbier	38–24	18–12	SLC Tournament Champions	2018 NCAA Division I baseball tournament
2019	Bobby Barbier	30–25	15–15		
2020	Bobby Barbier	12–4	2–1		Season cancelled due to the COVID-19 pandemic.
2021	Bobby Barbier	27–26	20–16	6th	
2022	Bobby Barbier	25–29	12–12	T-4th	
Total:					
National champion Postseason invitational champion Conference regular season champion Conference regular season and conference tournament champion Division regular season champion Division regular season and conference tournament champion Conference tournament champion

== Major League Baseball ==
Northwestern State has had 54 Major League Baseball draft selections since the draft began in 1965.

Demons in the Major League Baseball Draft
Year	Player	Round	Team
1969	Donnie Shields	15	Senators
1974	Robert Hrapman	2	Cardinals
1980	Kenneth Stelly	25	Mets
1983	Steve Graf	26	Expos
1985	Clifton Walker	14	Phillies
1985	Dave Reynolds	22	White Sox
1987	Vaughn Williams	18	Cubs
1988	Ken Morris	18	Cubs
1988	Bob Kairis	23	Indians
1989	Dickey Marze	17	Braves
1989	Gil Galloway	27	Reds
1990	Kevin Berry	19	Reds
1990	Rolando Fernandez	45	Cubs
1991	Brian Carlin	30	Reds
1991	Robert Conway	40	Mets
1995	Terry Joseph	13	Cubs
1996	Kevin Needham	19	Reds
1998	Brandon Emanuel	2	Angels
1998	Brian Lawrence	17	Padres
1998	Allen Davis	24	Dodgers
1998	Chris Brown	33	Cubs
1999	Tom Batson	28	Phillies
2000	Clifton Glidewell	30	Dodgers
2001	Jordan Robison	14	Cardinals
2001	Gene Desalme	16	Brewers
2002	O.J. King	8	Reds
2002	Carl Makowsky	18	Orioles
2002	Tyler Durham	37	Cardinals
2004	Clayton Turner	27	Athletics
2005	Blake Jones	25	Marlins
2005	Daniel Lonsberry	25	Orioles
2006	Miles Durham	22	Pirates
2007	Brandon Richey	10	Mets
2010	Chad Sheppard	17	Mets
2010	Ryan Zimmerman	30	Diamondbacks
2010	Oscar Garcia	31	Padres
2010	Chase Lyles	32	Pirates
2010	Lucas Irvine	43	White Sox
2011	Lucas Irvine	27	Rays
2011	Aaron Munoz	34	Blue Jays
2012	Mason Melotakis	2	Twins
2012	Joseph Scanio	16	Cardinals
2012	Carson Goldsmith	28	Twins
2014	Bret Underwood	20	Giants
2016	Nick Heath	16	Royals
2016	Adam Oller	20	Pirates
2016	Daniel Garner	32	Phillies
2018	David Fry	7	Brewers
2018	Kwan Adkins	30	Giants
2019	Nate Jones	5	Mets
2019	Caleb Ricca	23	Mariners
2020	Logan Hofmann	5	Pirates

== See also ==
- List of NCAA Division I baseball programs
