= UT Arlington Mavericks baseball =

Intercollegiate baseball team in Texas, US

UT Arlington Mavericks
- 2026 UT Arlington Mavericks baseball team
- Founded: 1969 (56 years ago)
- University: University of Texas at Arlington
- Head coach: Mike Trapasso (2nd season)
- Conference: WAC
- Location: Arlington, Texas
- Home stadium: Clay Gould Ballpark (Capacity: 1,600)
- Nickname: Mavericks
- Colors: Royal blue, white, and orange

NCAA tournament appearances
- 1990, 1992, 2001, 2006, 2012

Conference tournament champions
- Southland: 2001, 2006, 2012

Conference regular season champions
- Sunbelt: 2017 (West Division); WAC: 2013; Southland: 1990, 1992

The UT Arlington Mavericks baseball team is a varsity intercollegiate athletic team of the University of Texas at Arlington in Arlington, Texas, United States. The team is a member of the Western Athletic Conference, which is part of the National Collegiate Athletic Association's Division I. The team plays its home games at Clay Gould Ballpark in Arlington, Texas. The Mavericks are coached by Mike Trapasso.

== History ==
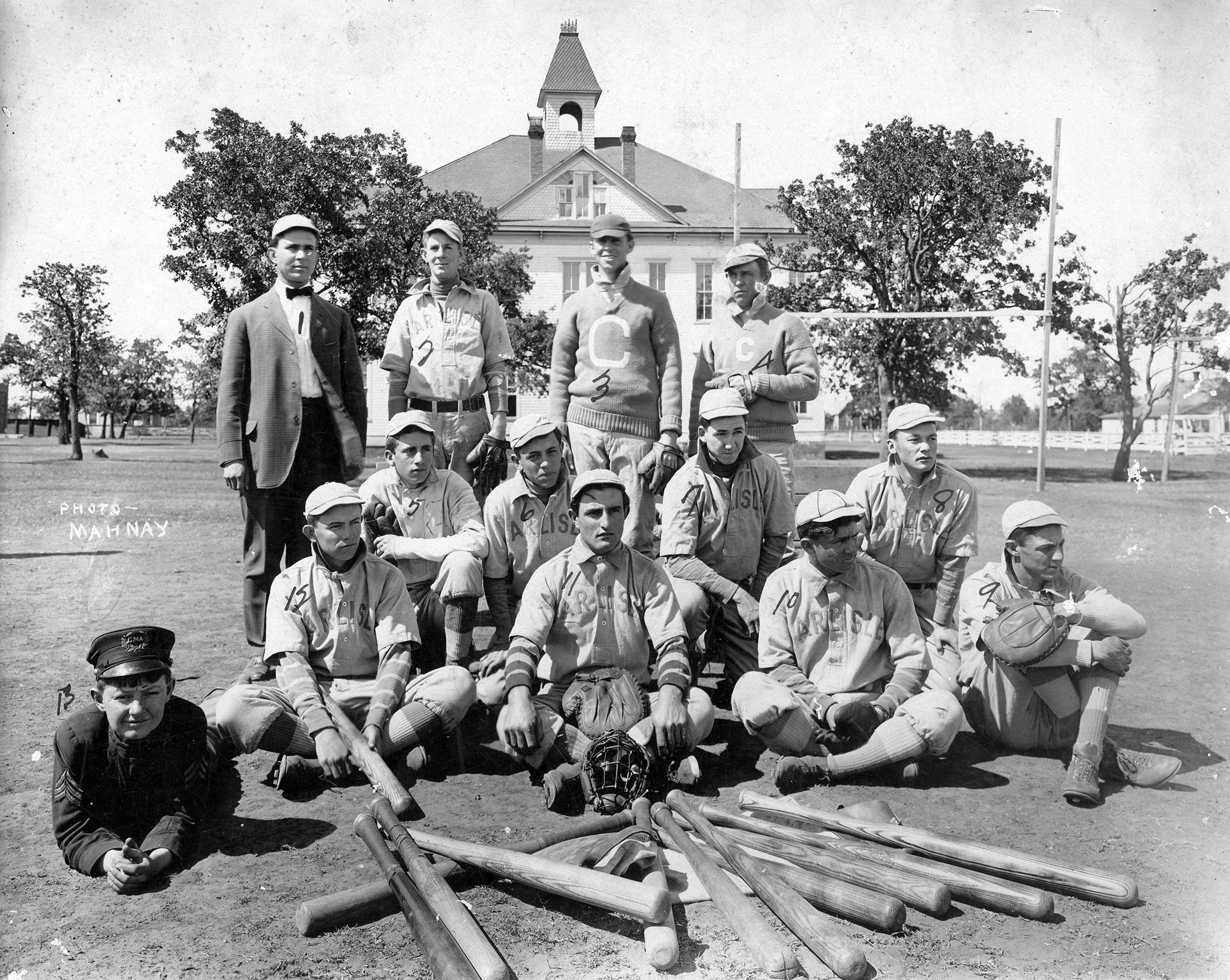
Carlisle Military Academy baseball team, 1910 or 1911

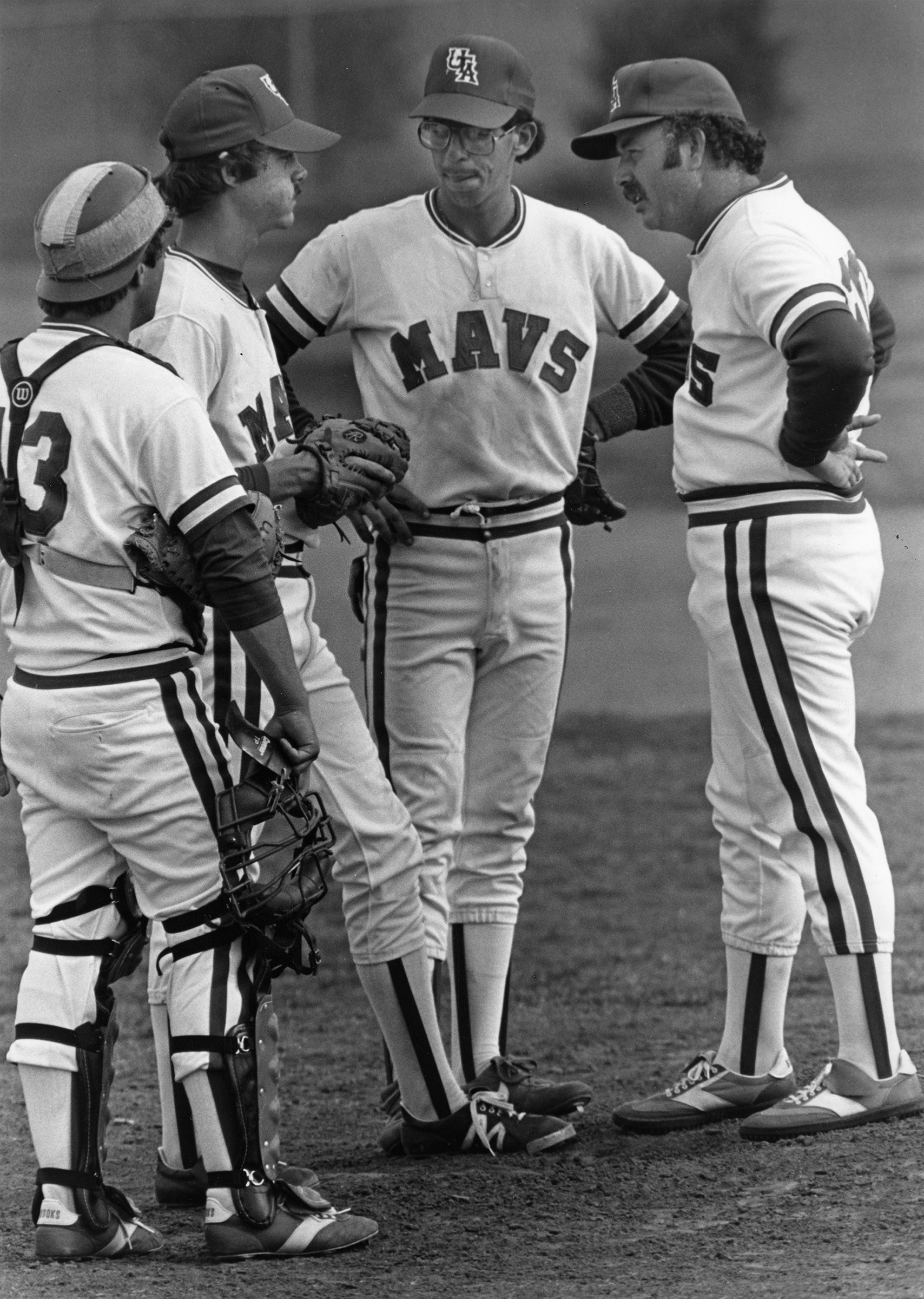
UTA baseball team, circa 1970s

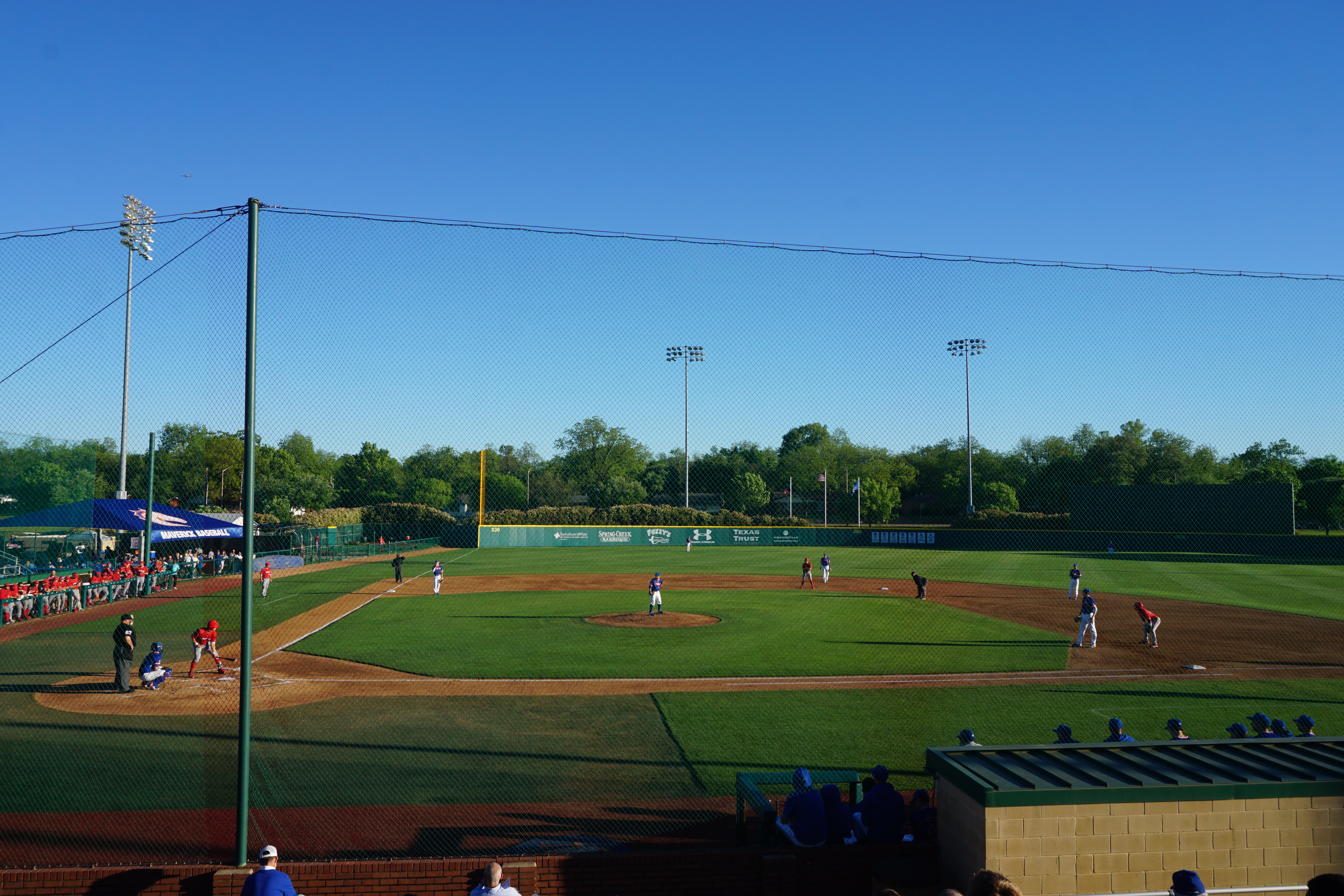
UTA hosting the Louisiana Ragin' Cajuns in 2019

The UTA Mavericks began intercollegiate baseball in 1969 as the Athletic Department moved from the College Division to the University level, which required schools to sponsor more sports than UTA did at that time. As the only founding member of the Southland Conference to not offer the sport, UTA immediately had a conference home.

Tom Beasley became UTA's first head coach. After two losing seasons, Fred Mathews Took the helm and guided the Mavericks to their first winning season and a second-place finish in the SLC. He coached for two more seasons before a legend would guide the Mavericks for the next 26 seasons.

Butch McBroom amassed 756 wins, which is by far the most for any Maverick coach and still second all-time in the Southland. His teams won two Conference Championships, were runners-up six times and participated in two NCAA tournaments. He occasionally landed in national rankings as well. His players earned four pitcher-of the-year awards, one player of-the-year, one hitter-of-the-year and three newcomer-of-the-year while he, himself, won four coach-of-the-year honors.

In 1994, the Mavericks finished four games under .500, breaking a streak of 14-straight winning seasons. It marked the first of six-consecutive sub-.500 years, until he retired after the 1999 season.

Clay Gould was hired as the fourth coach in Maverick history. He played for the Mavericks in the early 1990s during their two NCAA tournament runs and was named the 1993 Southland Conference Player-of-the-Year. His first year was a rebuilding year, but in 2001, UTA won their first Southland Conference tournament and advanced to the NCAA tournament.

Against the Houston Cougars, Craig Martin, who retired as UTA's all-time hits leader and is still currently UTA's all-time doubles leader, hit a late-inning home run to win UTA's first NCAA tournament game. UTA's two losses were to host Rice University, which advanced to the Super Regional.

During the season, Coach Gould was battling colon cancer, and he died shortly after the season ended.

Jeff Curtis succeeded Coach Gould in 2002 and in 2006, UTA won their second Southland Conference tournament.

Former Head coach Darin Thomas, who was an assistant coach under Clay Gould and associate head coach with Jeff Curtis, officially took the reins in 2008. In 2012, his team won the Southland Conference Tournament to advance to an NCAA regional for the fifth time in program history. In 2013, as the team played their first and last season in the Western Athletic Conference, the team was co-champions with California State University-Bakersfield. In 2017, the team won a program record 20 conference games en route to a West Division championship in the Sun Belt.

Since 2013, the baseball team annually plays one game against a Division I opponent in Globe Life Park.

== UT Arlington in the NCAA tournament ==
Year	Record	Pct	Notes
1990	0–2	.000	Central Regional
1992	0–2	.000	Central Regional
2001	1–2	.333	Houston Regional
2006	0–2	.000	Austin Regional
2012	0–2	.000	Waco Regional
TOTALS	1-10	.091	

== Season-by-season results ==
Statistics overview
Season	Coach	Overall	Conference	Standing	Postseason
Southland Conference (1969–2012)
1969	Beasley	6–16	0–8	5th	
1970	Beasley	10–18	3–9	5th	
Tom Beasley:		16–34 (.320)	3–17 (.150)		
1971	Mathews	22–12	8–4	2nd	
1972	Mathews	18–25	8–9	4th	
1973	Mathews	20–17	7–7	4th	
Fred Mathews:		60–54 (.526)	23–20 (.535)		
1974	McBroom	23–28	3–12	6th	
1975	McBroom	22–27	6–9	4th	
1976	McBroom	29–21	7–8	T–3rd	
1977	McBroom	14–39	4–10	6th	
1978	McBroom	34–27–1	9–11	4th	
1979	McBroom	21–28	7–13	5th	
1980	McBroom	35–25	10–5	3rd	
1981	McBroom	38–23	9–4	2nd	
1982	McBroom	37–20	4–8	5th	
1983	McBroom	30–23	8–8	T–2nd	
1984	McBroom	30–20	10–2	2nd	
1985	McBroom	35–26	8–9	4th	
1986	McBroom	30–26	12–5	2nd	
1987	McBroom	32–26			
1988	McBroom	33–22	10–9	3rd	
1989	McBroom	33–23	11–7	2nd	
1990	McBroom	31–30	11–5	1st	NCAA Central Regional, L 0–2
1991	McBroom	32–22	8–6	3rd	
1992	McBroom	40–15	16–5	1st	NCAA Central Regional, L 0–2
1993	McBroom	34–20	17–6	2nd	Southland Tournament, L 1–2
1994	McBroom	25–29	13–11	5th	
1995	McBroom	27–32	14–10	4th	Southland Tournament, L 1–2
1996	McBroom	23–35	13–17	6th	Southland Tournament, L 0–2
1997	McBroom	22–35	12–17	5th	Southland Tournament, L 1–2
1998	McBroom	20–29	9–13	7th	
1999	McBroom	26–35	14–13	5th	Southland Tournament, L 3–2
Butch McBroom:		756–686–1 (.524)	245–223 (.524)		
2000	Gould	24–30	9–18	9th	
2001	Gould	39–25	15–11	T–3rd	Southland Tournament, W 4–0; NCAA Houston Regional, L 1–2
Clay Gould:		63–55 (.534)	24–29 (.453)		
2002	Curtis	29–29	15–11	4th	Southland Tournament, L 0–2
2003	Curtis	37–25	18–9	3rd	Southland Tournament, L 4–2
2004	Curtis	32–26	14–13	4th	Southland Tournament, L 1–2
2005	Curtis	26–32	14–13	4th	Southland Tournament, L 1–2
2006	Curtis	29–36	16–12	5th	Southland Tournament, W 4–1; NCAA Austin Regional, L 0–2
2007	Curtis	13–40	4–26	12th	
Jeff Curtis:		166–188 (.469)	111–127 (.466)		
2008	Thomas	26–31	16–14	6th	Southland Tournament, L 0–2
2009	Thomas	30–26	19–13	5th	Southland Tournament, L 1–2
2010	Thomas	29–31	19–14	5th	Southland Tournament, L 2–2
2011	Thomas	27–29	15–18	T–7th	
2012	Thomas	36–25	19–14	T–3rd	Southland tournament, W 4–0; NCAA Waco Regional, L 0–2
Western Athletic Conference (2013)
2013	Thomas	31–27	18–9	T–1st	WAC tournament, L 1–2
Sun Belt Conference (2014–2022)
2014	Thomas	30–25	19–11	2nd	SBC tournament, L 3–1
2015	Thomas	24–32	14–16	7th	SBC tournament, L 1–2
2016	Thomas	30–28	15–15	7th	SBC tournament, L 1–2
2017	Thomas	30–25	20–10	3rd, 1st in West Division	SBC tournament, L 0–1
2018	Thomas	22-35	11-19	t8th, t4th in West Division	SBC tournament, L 1–2
2019	Thomas	32–26	17–12	4th, 3rd in West Division	SBC tournament, L 1–2
2020	Thomas	12–4	0–0		(Season cut short by the COVID-19 pandemic)
2021	Thomas	27–30	13–11	4th, 2nd in West Division	
2022	Thomas	15–39	7–23	11th	
Darin Thomas:		401–414 (.492)	222–199 (.527)		
Total:		1,462–1,430–1 (.506)			
National champion Postseason invitational champion Conference regular season champion Conference regular season and conference tournament champion Division regular season champion Division regular season and conference tournament champion Conference tournament champion

== See also ==
- List of NCAA Division I baseball programs
