= Nicholls Colonels baseball =

American college baseball team

- 2026 Nicholls Colonels baseball team
- Founded: 1960
- University: Nicholls State University
- Head coach: Brent Haring (2nd season)
- Conference: Southland
- Location: Thibodaux, Louisiana
- Home stadium: Ben Meyer Diamond at Ray E. Didier Field (Capacity: 2,100)
- Nickname: Colonels
- Colors: Red and gray

NCAA tournament appearances
- 1970*, 1972*, 1974*, 1976*, 1977*, 1989, 1992, 1998, 2023, 2024

Conference tournament champions
- 1984, 1998, 2023, 2024

Conference regular season champions
- 1974*, 1976*, 1985, 2023 *at Division II level

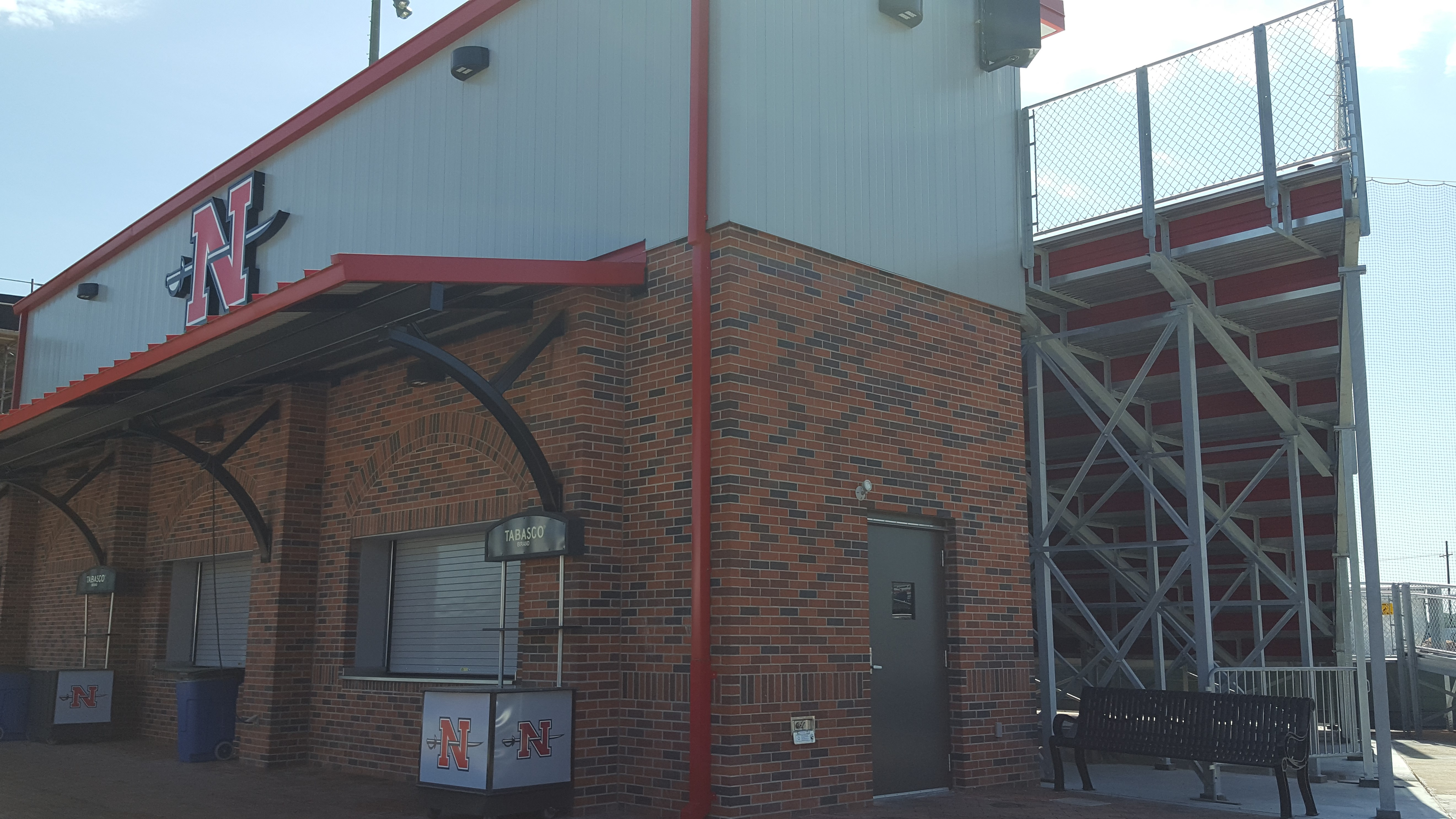
Ben Meyer Diamond at Ray E. Didier Field

The Nicholls Colonels baseball team is a varsity intercollegiate athletic team of Nicholls State University in Thibodaux, Louisiana. The team is a member of the Southland Conference, which is part of the National Collegiate Athletic Association's Division I. Nicholls State's first baseball team was fielded in 1960. The team plays its home games at 2,100-seat Ben Meyer Diamond at Ray E. Didier Field and is coached by Brent Haring.

== Championships ==
=== Conference championships ===
Regular season

- Gulf South: 1974, 1976
- Gulf Star: 1985
- Southland: 2023

Tournament

- Trans America Athletic: 1984
- Southland: 1998, 2023, 2024

== History ==
=== NCAA tournament appearances ===
- NCAA Division I baseball tournament: 1989, 1992, 1998, 2023, 2024
- NCAA Division II baseball tournament: 1970, 1972, 1974, 1976, 1977

=== Nicholls in the NCAA Tournament ===
Year	Record	Pct	Notes
1989	0–2	.000	South Regional
1992	0–2	.000	Mideast Regional
1998	0–2	.000	South II Regional
2023	0–2	.000	Tuscaloosa Regional
2024	0–2	.000	Corvallis Regional
TOTALS	0–10	.000	

== Conference affiliations ==
Years	Conference	Classification
1960–1965	Independent	NCAA College Division
1966–1971	Gulf States Conference	NCAA College Division
1972	Gulf South Conference	NCAA College Division
1973–1979	Gulf South Conference	NCAA Division II
1980–1982	Independent	NCAA Division I
1983–1984	Trans America Athletic Conference	NCAA Division I
1985–1987	Gulf Star Conference	NCAA Division I
1988–1991	Independent	NCAA Division I
1992–present	Southland Conference	NCAA Division I

== Stadiums ==
=== Ben Meyer Diamond at Ray E. Didier Field ===
Ben Meyer Diamond at Ray E. Didier Field is a baseball stadium in Thibodaux, Louisiana. It is the 2,100-seat home stadium of the Nicholls Colonels college baseball team. The stadium which opened in 1960 is named for Raymond "Ray" Didier, a former Nicholls head baseball coach and athletic director. The diamond is named for Ben Meyer.

== Head coaches ==
Name	Years
Jim Hall	1960–1963
Raymond "Ray" Didier	1964–1973
T.C. Calmes	1974–1979
Mike Knight	1980–1996
Jim Pizzolatto	1997–1999
B.D. Parker	2000–2005
Chip Durham	2006–2010
Seth Thibodeaux	2011–2021
Mike Silva	2022–2024
Brent Haring	2025-

== See also ==
- List of NCAA Division I baseball programs
- Nicholls Colonels
