= 2014 Sam Houston State Bearkats baseball team =

American college baseball season

2014 Sam Houston State Bearkats baseball

Southland Conference Regular Season
- Conference: Southland Conference
- Record: 43–19 (22–8 Southland)
- Head coach: David Pierce (3rd season)
- Assistant coaches: Sean Allen (3rd season); Philip Miller (3rd season); Phil Haig (2nd season)
- Home stadium: Don Sanders Stadium

2014 Southland Conference baseball standings
	Conf.				Overall
Team	W		L	PCT	W		L	PCT
Sam Houston State ‍†‍‍^{y}	22	–	8	.733	43	–	19	.694
Nicholls State ‍‍‍	21	–	9	.700	32	–	26	.552
Northwestern State ‍‍‍	19	–	11	.633	33	–	26	.559
Texas A&M–Corpus Christi ‍‍‍	19	–	11	.633	31	–	27	.534
Southeastern Louisiana ‍‍‡‍^{y}	18	–	12	.600	38	–	25	.603
Central Arkansas ‍‍‍	17	–	13	.567	32	–	22	.593
McNeese State ‍‍‍	17	–	13	.567	30	–	28	.517
Lamar ‍‍‍	16	–	14	.533	31	–	25	.554
Oral Roberts ‍‍‍	15	–	15	.500	30	–	26	.536
Houston Baptist ‍‍‍	12	–	18	.400	23	–	28	.451
Incarnate Word* ‍‍‍	9	–	15	.375	18	–	32	.360
Stephen F. Austin ‍‍‍	11	–	19	.367	20	–	35	.364
Abilene Christian* ‍‍‍	6	–	18	.250	18	–	36	.333
New Orleans ‍‍‍	2	–	28	.067	11	–	38	.224
† – Conference champion ‡ – Tournament champion y – Invited to the NCAA tournament Rankings from Collegiate Baseball; *Ineligible for postseason play due to Division I transition

The 2014 Sam Houston State Bearkats baseball team represented Sam Houston State University in the 2014 intercollegiate baseball season. Sam Houston State competes in Division I of the National Collegiate Athletic Association (NCAA) as a member of the Southland Conference. The Bearkats play home games at Don Sanders Stadium on the university's campus in Huntsville, Texas. Third year head coach David Pierce leads the Bearkats.

== Personnel ==
=== Coaches ===
2014 Sam Houston State Bearkats baseball coaching staff
No.	Name	Position	Tenure	Alma mater
22	David Pierce	Head coach	3rd season	University of Houston
3	Sean Allen	Assistant coach	6th season (Note: 6th season overall coaching with the Sam Houston State Bearkats.)	University of Houston
12	Philip Miller	Assistant coach	3rd season	Northwestern State University
19	Phil Haig	Assistant coach	2nd season	Florida International University

== Schedule ==
2014 Sam Houston State Bearkats baseball game log
Regular season (40–15)

February (9–1)
Date	Opponent	Site/stadium	Score	Win	Loss	Save	Attendance	Overall record
Feb 14	Northern Colorado	Don Sanders Stadium • Huntsville, TX	W 5–3	Tyler Eppler (1–0)	Chris Hammer (0–1)	Alan Scott (1)	903	1–0
Feb 15	Northern Colorado	Don Sanders Stadium • Huntsville, TX	W 8–1	Andrew Godail (1–0)	Josh Tinnon (0–1)	—	846	2–0
Feb 16	Northern Colorado	Don Sanders Stadium • Huntsville, TX	W 5–0	Dylan Ebbs (1–0)	Connor Leedholm (0–1)	Jason Simms (1)	740	3–0
Feb 17	Northern Colorado	Don Sanders Stadium • Huntsville, TX	W 7–1	Sam Odom (1–0)	Nick Miller (0–1)	—	637	4–0
Feb 18	at McNeese State	Cowboy Diamond • Lake Charles, LA	W 18–6	Alan Scott (1–0)	Lucas Quary (1–1)	—	548	5–0
Feb 21	Dallas Baptist	Don Sanders Stadium • Huntsville, TX	L 1–5	Paul Voelker (2–0)	Tyler Eppler (1–1)	—	975	5–1
Feb 22	Dallas Baptist	Don Sanders Stadium • Huntsville, TX	W 12–2	Andrew Godail (2–0)	Drew Smith (1–1)	Sam Odom (1)	794	6–1
Feb 25	at #15 Rice	Reckling Park • Houston, TX	W 3–1	Ryan Brinley (1–0)	Matt Ditman (0–2)	Jason Sims (3)	1,846	8–1
Houston College Classic
Feb 28	vs. #12 TCU	Minute Maid Park • Houston, TX	W 3–1	Tyler Eppler (2–1)	Brandon Finnegan (2–1)	—	N/A	9–1

March (10–9)
Date	Opponent	Rank^{#}	Site/stadium	Score	Win	Loss	Save	Attendance	Overall record
Houston College Classic
Mar 1	vs. #26 Texas Tech		Minute Maid Park • Houston, TX	W 10–6	Sam Odom (2–0)	Matt Withrow (1–1)	—	N/A	10–1
Mar 2	vs. #24 Texas		Minute Maid Park • Houston, TX	L 2–3	Morgan Cooper (1–0)	Jason Simms (0–1)	—	N/A	10–2
Mar 5	#29 Rice		Don Sanders Stadium • Huntsville, TX	L 5–8	Chase McDowell (1–1)	Logan Boyd (0–1)	Austin Orewiler (1)	925	10–3
Mar 7	Cal State Northridge		Don Sanders Stadium • Huntsville, TX	W 5–8	Tyler Eppler (3–1)	Jerry Keel (0–3)	—	670	11–3
Mar 8	Cal State Northridge		Don Sanders Stadium • Huntsville, TX	W 2–1	Sam Odom (3–0)	Brycen Rutherford (1–2)	Jason Simms (4)	553	12–3
Mar 9	Cal State Northridge		Don Sanders Stadium • Huntsville, TX	W 3–2^{(13 INN)}	Ryan Brinley (2–0)	Brandon Warner (0–1)	—	553	13–3
Mar 11	UTSA		Don Sanders Stadium • Huntsville, TX	L 2–9	Logan Onda (2–1)	Ryan Brinley (2–1)	—	848	13–4
Mar 14	at New Orleans*		Maestri Field at Privateer Park • New Orleans, LA	W 6–3	Tyler Eppler (4–0)	Alex Smith (0–3)	Alan Scott (2)	338	14–4
Mar 15	at New Orleans*		Maestri Field at Privateer Park • New Orleans, LA	W 14–4	Sam Odom (4–0)	Darron McKigney (0–3)	—	211	15–4
Mar 15	at New Orleans*		Maestri Field at Privateer Park • New Orleans, LA	W 7–2	Dirk Masters (1–0)	Nick Halliday (2–1)	—	211	16–4
Mar 18	at UT Arlington	#25	Clay Gould Ballpark • Arlington, TX	L 6–7	Daniel Milliman (1–0)	Ryan Brinley (2–2)	Zach Hobbs (1)	317	16–5
Mar 21	at Central Arkansas*	#25	Bear Stadium • Conway, AR	L 7–9	Connor Gilmore (2–0)	Tyler Eppler (4–2)	—	422	16–6
Mar 22	at Central Arkansas*	#25	Bear Stadium • Conway, AR	L 2–4	Chris Caudle (4–2)	Sam Odom (4–1)	—	355	16–7
Mar 23	at Central Arkansas*	#25	Bear Stadium • Conway, AR	L 4–6	Connor McClain (2–1)	Dirk Masters (1–1)	Scott Zimmerle (1)	295	16–8
Mar 25	at Texas A&M		Olsen Field at Blue Bell Park • College Station, TX	W 8–1	Jason Simms (1–1)	Ryan Hendrix (0–2)	—	4,153	17–8
Mar 26	McNeese State		Don Sanders Stadium • Huntsville, TX	W 3–1	Dylan Ebbs (2–0)	Cory Lapeze (0–2)	Ryan Brinley (1)	614	18–8
Mar 28	Northwestern State*		Don Sanders Stadium • Huntsville, TX	L 1–12	Adam Oller (3–0)	Tyler Eppler (4–3)	—	637	18–9
Mar 29	Northwestern State*		Don Sanders Stadium • Huntsville, TX	W 9–4	Sam Odom (5–1)	John Gault (3–3)	—	863	19–9
Mar 30	Northwestern State*		Don Sanders Stadium • Huntsville, TX	L 1–3	Steven Spann (6–3)	Jason Simms (1–2)	—	1,102	19–10

April (12–4)
Date	Opponent	Site/stadium	Score	Win	Loss	Save	Attendance	Overall record
Apr 4	at Oral Roberts*	J. L. Johnson Stadium • Tulsa, OK	L 4–7	Kurt Giller (1–0)	Tyler Eppler (4–4)	Hayden Holley (1)	557	19–11
Apr 5	at Oral Roberts*	J. L. Johnson Stadium • Tulsa, OK	W 2–1	Jason Simms (2–2)	Jordan Romano (1–2)	—	548	20–11
Apr 6	at Oral Roberts*	J. L. Johnson Stadium • Tulsa, OK	W 7–4	Sam Odom (6–1)	Gavin Glanz (1–3)	—	540	21–11
Apr 8	Baylor	Don Sanders Stadium • Huntsville, TX	W 4–3	Ryan Brinley (3–2)	Sean Spicer (0–1)	Alan Scott (3)	1,336	22–11
Apr 11	Abilene Christian*	Don Sanders Stadium • Huntsville, TX	W 8–3	Jason Simms (3–2)	Nate Cole (1–6)	—	732	23–11
Apr 12	Abilene Christian*	Don Sanders Stadium • Huntsville, TX	W 3–2^{(11 INN)}	Alan Scott (2–0)	Kevin Sheets (3–2)	—	870	24–11
Apr 12	Abilene Christian*	Don Sanders Stadium • Huntsville, TX	W 7–0	Sam Odom (7–1)	Garrett Demeyere (3–4)	—	870	25–11
Apr 15	#28 Houston	Don Sanders Stadium • Huntsville, TX	L 2–5	Andrew Lantrip (3–0)	Seth Holbert (1–1)	Tyler Ford (2)	1,191	25–12
Apr 17	at Lamar*	Vincent–Beck Stadium • Beaumont, TX	W 9–8	Alex Bisacca (1–0)	Fernandez (0–3)	Ryan Brinley (2)	793	26–12
Apr 18	at Lamar*	Vincent–Beck Stadium • Beaumont, TX	L 3–13^{(8 INN)}	Angelle (3–4)	Tyler Eppler (4–5)	—	816	26–13
Apr 19	at Lamar*	Vincent–Beck Stadium • Beaumont, TX	L 5–6	Perry (2–0)	Sam Odom (7–2)	Wade (2)	827	26–14
Apr 22	at Houston	Cougar Field • Houston, TX	W 5–4	Seth Holbert (2–1)	Aaron Stewart (0–2)	Ryan Brinley (3)	1,121	27–14
Apr 25	Southeastern Louisiana*	Don Sanders Stadium • Huntsville, TX	W 2–1	Tyler Eppler (5–5)	Andro Cutura (7–2)	—	826	28–14
Apr 26	Southeastern Louisiana*	Don Sanders Stadium • Huntsville, TX	W 5–3	Nolan Riggs (1–0)	Tate Scioneaux (6–4)	Ryan Brinley (4)	728	29–14
Apr 27	Southeastern Louisiana*	Don Sanders Stadium • Huntsville, TX	W 4–1	Sam Odom (8–2)	Sean Kennel (4–3)	Ryan Brinley (5)	716	30–14
Apr 29	at Baylor	Baylor Ballpark • Waco, TX	W 4–2	Dylan Ebbs (3–0)	Drew Tolson (2–5)	Ryan Brinley (6)	2,345	31–14

May (9–1)
Date	Opponent	Rank^{#}	Site/stadium	Score	Win	Loss	Save	Attendance	Overall record
May 2	Stephen F. Austin*		Don Sanders Stadium • Huntsville, TX	W 5–4	Tyler Eppler (6–5)	Dillon Mangham (6–5)	Ryan Brinley (7)	919	32–14
May 3	Stephen F. Austin*		Don Sanders Stadium • Huntsville, TX	W 12–1^{(8 INN)}	Jason Simms (4–2)	Kevin Bishop (1–7)	—	965	33–14
May 4	Stephen F. Austin*		Don Sanders Stadium • Huntsville, TX	W 16–7	Nolan Riggs (2–0)	Tyler Wiedenfeld (1–2)	—	793	34–14
May 9	at Houston Baptist*		Husky Field • Houston, TX	W 3–1	Tyler Eppler (7–5)	Taylor Wright (2–9)	—	391	35–14
May 10	at Houston Baptist*		Husky Field • Houston, TX	W 7–2	Jason Simms (5–2)	Ryan Lower (6–3)	Alan Scott (4)	405	36–14
May 11	at Houston Baptist*		Husky Field • Houston, TX	W 8–4	Andrew Godail (3–0)	Curtis Jones (4–4)	Ryan Brinley (8)	427	37–14
May 13	at Texas A&M	#25	Olsen Field at Blue Bell Park • College Station, TX	L 1–3	Kent (3–1)	Dylan Ebbs (3–1)	Minter (2)	3,997	37–15
May 15	Texas A&M–Corpus Christi*	#25	Don Sanders Stadium • Huntsville, TX	W 9–2	Tyler Eppler (8–5)	Matt Danton (7–3)	—	722	38–15
May 16	Texas A&M–Corpus Christi*	#25	Don Sanders Stadium • Huntsville, TX	W 13–3	Alan Scott (3–0)	Trevor Belicek (4–6)	—	894	39–15
May 17	Texas A&M–Corpus Christi*	#25	Don Sanders Stadium • Huntsville, TX	W 9–1	Sam Odom (9–2)	Devin Skapura (4–4)	—	870	40–15

Postseason (3–4)

Southland Conference Tournament
Date	Opponent	(Seed)/Rank	Site/stadium	Score	Win	Loss	Save	Attendance	Overall record	Tournament record
May 21	vs. (8) Lamar	(1) #22	Bear Stadium • Conway, AR	W 10–4	Nolan Riggs (3–0)	Angelle (4–7)	—	758	41–15	1–0
May 22	vs. (5) Southeastern Louisiana	(1) #22	Bear Stadium • Conway, AR	L 0–1	Tate Scioneaux (7–6)	Tyler Eppler (8–6)	Mason Klotz (5)	535	41–16	1–1
May 23	vs. (4) Northwestern State	(1) #22	Bear Stadium • Conway, AR	L 1–4	Steven Spann (8–6)	Jason Simms (5–3)	—	873	41–17	1–2

Fort Worth Regional
Date	Opponent	(Seed)/Rank	Site/stadium	Score	Win	Loss	Save	Attendance	Overall record	Regional record
May 30	vs. (2) Dallas Baptist	(3)	Lupton Stadium • Fort Worth, TX	W 2–1	Tyler Eppler (9–6)	Josh Urban (3–1)	Alan Scott (5)	3,201	42–17	1–0
May 31	vs. (1) #9 TCU	(3)	Lupton Stadium • Fort Worth, TX	L 1–2^{(22 INN)}	Brian Trieglaff (2–0)	Dylan Ebbs (3–2)	Riley Ferrell (14)	4,207	42–18	1–1
June 1	vs. (4) Siena	(3)	Lupton Stadium • Fort Worth, TX	W 9–2	Sam Odom (10–2)	Bryan Goossens (3–5)	Seth Holbert (1)	2,970	43–18	2–1
June 1	vs. (1) #9 TCU	(3)	Lupton Stadium • Fort Worth, TX	L 1–6	Tyler Alexander (10–3)	Andrew Goodail (3–1)	—	4,012	43–19	2–2

*Southland Conference game. ^{#}Rankings from Collegiate Baseball released prior to game.

== Ranking movements ==
Ranking movements Legend: ██ Increase in ranking ██ Decrease in ranking — = Not ranked RV = Received votes т = Tied with team above or below
	Week																		
Poll	Pre	1	2	3	4	5	6	7	8	9	10	11	12	13	14	15	16	17	Final
Coaches'	—	—*	—*	T24	RV	23	RV	RV	—	—	—	—	RV	RV	24	RV	RV*	RV*	RV
Baseball America	—	—	—	20	18	16	—	—	—	—	—	—	—	—	25	—	—*	—*	—
Collegiate Baseball^	—	—	—	—	—	25	—	—	—	—	—	—	—	25	22	—	—	—	—
NCBWA†	—	—	—	28	24	22	RV	RV	—	RV	—	RV	28	26	23	25	RV	RV*	RV

^ Collegiate Baseball ranked 40 teams in their preseason poll, but only ranked 30 teams weekly during the season.
† NCBWA ranks 30 teams in their preseason poll, but only ranks 25 teams weekly during the season.
* A new poll was not released for this week, so for comparison purposes, the previous week's ranking is inserted in this week's slot.
