= 2014 Lamar Cardinals baseball team =

American college baseball season

2014 Lamar Cardinals baseball
- Conference: Southland Conference
- Record: 31–25 (16–14 SLC)
- Head coach: Jim Gilligan (38th season)
- Assistant coaches: Jim Rickelfsen (16th season); Scott Hatten (14th season)
- Home stadium: Vincent–Beck Stadium (Capacity: 3,500)

2014 Southland Conference baseball standings
	Conf.				Overall
Team	W		L	PCT	W		L	PCT
Sam Houston State ‍†‍‍^{y}	22	–	8	.733	43	–	19	.694
Nicholls State ‍‍‍	21	–	9	.700	32	–	26	.552
Northwestern State ‍‍‍	19	–	11	.633	33	–	26	.559
Texas A&M–Corpus Christi ‍‍‍	19	–	11	.633	31	–	27	.534
Southeastern Louisiana ‍‍‡‍^{y}	18	–	12	.600	38	–	25	.603
Central Arkansas ‍‍‍	17	–	13	.567	32	–	22	.593
McNeese State ‍‍‍	17	–	13	.567	30	–	28	.517
Lamar ‍‍‍	16	–	14	.533	31	–	25	.554
Oral Roberts ‍‍‍	15	–	15	.500	30	–	26	.536
Houston Baptist ‍‍‍	12	–	18	.400	23	–	28	.451
Incarnate Word* ‍‍‍	9	–	15	.375	18	–	32	.360
Stephen F. Austin ‍‍‍	11	–	19	.367	20	–	35	.364
Abilene Christian* ‍‍‍	6	–	18	.250	18	–	36	.333
New Orleans ‍‍‍	2	–	28	.067	11	–	38	.224
† – Conference champion ‡ – Tournament champion y – Invited to the NCAA tournament Rankings from Collegiate Baseball; *Ineligible for postseason play due to Division I transition

The 2014 Lamar Cardinals baseball team represented Lamar University in the 2014 NCAA Division I baseball season. The Cardinals played their home games at Vincent–Beck Stadium as members of the Southland Conference. The team was coached by Jim Gilligan in his 38th season at Lamar. The Cardinals finished the season 8th in the Southland with a record of 31–25, 16–14 in conference play. They qualified for the 2014 Southland Conference baseball tournament as the 8th seeded team. The Cardinals' season ended after losing to Sam Houston State 4–10 and Northwestern State 8–10 in the conference tournament.

== Coaches ==
2014 Lamar Cardinals baseball coaching staff
- 29 Jim Gilligan – Head coach – 38th year
- 4 Jim Rickelfsen – Associate head coach – 16th year
- 10 Scott Hatten – Assistant coach – 14th year
- 11 Brian Nelson – Volunteer assistant

== Schedule ==
Legend
	Lamar win
	Lamar loss
	Postponement/Cancelation/Suspensions
**Bold**	Lamar team member
*	Non-Conference game
†	Make-Up Game

2014 Lamar Cardinals baseball game log
Regular season (31–25)

February (6–4)
Date	Opponent	Site/stadium	Score	Win	Loss	Save	Attendance	Overall record	SLC Record
Cardinal Classic
Feb 14	Marist*	Vincent–Beck Stadium • Beaumont, TX	7–6	**Warren, Lance (1–0)**	Eich, Jordan (0–1)	Kirkham, Brandon (1)	733	1–0	
Feb 14	UIC*	Vincent–Beck Stadium • Beaumont, TX	3–6 (12 inn)	WEYER, Collin (1–0)	**Aitken, Zach (0-1)**	None	903	1–1	
Feb 15	Marist*	Vincent–Beck Stadium • Beaumont, TX	3–4	Keenan, Sean (1–0)	**Fernandez, Danny (0–1)**	Thomas, Ryan (1)	902	1–2	
Feb 15	UIC*	Vincent–Beck Stadium • Beaumont, TX	8–7	**Janak, Brent (1–0)**	EVAK, Brian (0–1)	None	693	2–2	
Feb 19	Texas Southern*	Vincent–Beck Stadium • Beaumont, TX	4–8	Ryan, Rios (1–0) (2–0)	**Aitken, Zach (0–1)**	Pearson, Robert (1)	604	2–3	
Feb 21	LIU Brooklyn*	Vincent–Beck Stadium • Beaumont, TX	9–4	**McKinley, Jayson (1–0)**	DRAPEAU, Brian (0–1)	None	569	3–3	
Feb 22	LIU Brooklyn*	Vincent–Beck Stadium • Beaumont, TX	10–1	**Angelle, Chase (1–0)**	FREIJOMIL, Nick (0–1)	None		4–3	
Feb 22	LIU Brooklyn	Vincent–Beck Stadium • Beaumont, TX	3–1	**Hibbs, Will (1–0)**	MAXWELL, Bobby (0–1)	**Kirkham, Brandon (2)**	694	5–3	
Feb 23	LIU Brooklyn*	Vincent–Beck Stadium • Beaumont, TX	11–4	**Janak, Brent (1–0)**	LACKO, Chas (0–1)	None	597	6–3	
Feb 29	at Texas–Pan American*	Vincent–Beck Stadium • Beaumont, TX	1–4	Sam Street (3–0)	Angelle, Chase (1–1)	None	612	6–4	

March (9–10)
Date	Opponent	Site/stadium	Score	Win	Loss	Save	Attendance	Overall record	SLC Record
Mar 1	Texas–Pan American*	Vincent–Beck Stadium • Beaumont, TX	5–3	**Kirkham, Brandon (1–0)**	Kyle Tokunaga (0–2)	**Fernandez, Danny (1)**	669	7–4	
Mar 2	Texas–Pan American*	Vincent–Beck Stadium • Beaumont, TX	7–0	**Autrey, J.T. (1–0)**	Andrew Padron (1–1)	Janak, Brent (1)	680	8–4	
Mar 5	at Baylor*	Baylor Ballpark • Waco, TX	2–3	Lewis (1–0)	**McKinley, Jayson (1–1)**	Michalec (4)	1,922	8–5	
Mar 7	at Harvard*	Vincent–Beck Stadium • Beaumont, TX	0–4	Sean Poppen (1–0)	**Angelle, Chase (1–2)**	Tanner Anderson (1)	753	8–6	
Mar 8	Harvard*	Vincent–Beck Stadium • Beaumont, TX	4–3	**Hibbs, Will (2–0)**	Nick Gruener (0–1)	**Perry, Hunter (1)**	871	9–6	
Mar 8	Harvard*	Vincent–Beck Stadium • Beaumont, TX	3–2 (inn 10)	**Janak, Brent (3–0)**	Danny Moskovits (0–2)	None	871	10–6	
Mar 9	Harvard*	Vincent–Beck Stadium • Beaumont, TX	10–3	**Aitken, Zach (1–2)**	Tanner Anderson (0–1)	None	573	11–6	
Mar 9	Harvard*	Vincent–Beck Stadium • Beaumont, TX	10–3	**Aitken, Zach (1–2)**	Tanner Anderson (0–1)	None	573	11–6	
Mar 12	Prairie View A&M*	Vincent–Beck Stadium • Beaumont, TX	18–6 (7 inn)	**Beasley, Andrew (1–0)**	Alex Richardson (0–1)	None	661	12–6	
Mar 14	at Southeastern Louisiana	Alumni Field • Hammond, LA	5–3 (10 inn)	**Autrey, J.T. (2–0)**	Hills, D. (1–2)	**Fernandez, Danny (2)**	860	13–6	1–0
Mar 15	at Southeastern Louisiana	Alumni Field • Hammond, LA	2–4	Scioneaux, T (4–0)	**Angelle, Chase (1–3)**	None	455	13–7	1–1
Mar 15	at Southeastern Louisiana	Alumni Field • Hammond, LA	6–7	Keller, K. (2–0)	**Janak, Brent (3–1)**	Klotz, M. (1)	375	13–8	1–2
Mar 18	at Houston*	Cougar Field • Houston, TX	4–2	**Warren, Lance (2–0)**	Stewart (0–1)	**Fernandez, Danny (3)**	1,221	14–8	
Mar 21	Nicholls State	Vincent–Beck Stadium • Beaumont, TX	0–4	Byrd, Taylor (4–1)	**Hibbs, Will (2-1)**	None	668	14–9	1–3
Mar 22	Nicholls State	Vincent–Beck Stadium • Beaumont, TX	4–6	Picciola, Marc (1-2)	**Fernandez, Danny (0–2)**	None		14–10	1–4
Mar 22	Nicholls State	Vincent–Beck Stadium • Beaumont, TX	6–8	Jackson, Brandon (2–1)	**Autrey, J.T. (2–1)**	Picciola, Marc (4)	724	14–11	1–5
Mar 26	Rice*	Vincent–Beck Stadium • Beaumont, TX	2–3	McCanna (2–2)	**Carver, David (0–1)**	T.Teykl (1)	1,843	14–12	
Mar 28	McNeese State	Vincent–Beck Stadium • Beaumont, TX	8–7 (11 inn)	**Autrey, J.T. (3-1)**	O'Bryant, Steven (1–3)	None	727	15–12	2–5
Mar 29	McNeese State	Vincent–Beck Stadium • Beaumont, TX	7–8	Clemens, Michael (4–1)	**Angelle, Chase (1–4)**	Lapeze, Cory (1)	744	15–13	2–6
Mar 30	McNeese State	Vincent–Beck Stadium • Beaumont, TX	4–6	Kingsley, Bryce (2–2)	**McKinley, Jayson (1–2)**	O'Bryant, Steven (1)	759	15–14	2–7

April (12–4)
Date	Opponent	Site/stadium	Score	Win	Loss	Save	Attendance	Overall record	SLC Record
Apr 4	at Abilene Christian	Crutcher Scott Field • Abilene, TX	6–4	**Hibbs, Will (3–1)**	Patke, S. (1–2)	**Warren, Lance (1)**	600	16–14	3–7
Apr 5	at Abilene Christian	Crutcher Scott Field • Abilene, TX	5–4	**Autrey, J.T. (4–1)**	Cole, N. (1–5)	**Fernandez, Danny (4)**	850	17–14	4–7
Apr 5	at Abilene Christian	Crutcher Scott Field • Abilene, TX	16–7	**Perry, Hunter (1–0)**	Demeyere, G. (3–3)	None	275	18–14	5–7
Apr 9	at LSU*	Alex Box Stadium, Skip Bertman Field • Baton Rouge, LA	0–5	Faucheux (2–0)	**Autrey, J.T. (4–2)**	None	10,209	18–15	
Apr 11	New Orleans	Vincent–Beck Stadium • Beaumont, TX	9–1	**Hibbs, Will (4–1)**	Smith, Alex (1–5)	**Wade, Derek (1)**	1,252	19–15	6–7
Apr 12	New Orleans	Vincent–Beck Stadium • Beaumont, TX	6–1	**Angelle, Chase (2–4)**	Halliday, Nick (2–4)	None	876	20–15	7–7
Apr 13	New Orleans	Vincent–Beck Stadium • Beaumont, TX	10–4	**Autrey, J.T. (5–2)**	McKigney, Darron (1–6)	None	708	21–15	8–7
Apr 15	Rice*	Vincent–Beck Stadium • Beaumont, TX	10–1	**Carver, David (1–1)**	McDowell (3–3)	None	942	22–15	
Apr 17	Sam Houston State	Vincent–Beck Stadium • Beaumont, TX	8–9	Bisacca, Alex (1–0)	**Fernandez, Danny (0–3)**	Brinley, Ryan (2)	793	22–16	8–8
Apr 18	Sam Houston State	Vincent–Beck Stadium • Beaumont, TX	13–3 (8 inn)	**Angelle, Chase (3–4)**	Eppler, Tyler (4–5)	None	816	23–16	9–8
Apr 19	Sam Houston State	Vincent–Beck Stadium • Beaumont, TX	6–5	**Perry, Hunter (2–0)**	Odom, Sam (7–2)	**Wade, Derek (2)**	827	24–16	10–8
Apr 25	at Stephen F. Austin	Jaycees Field • Nacogdoches, TX	2–10	Mangham, D. (6–4)	**Hibbs, Will (4–2)**	None	307	24–17	10–9
Apr 26	at Stephen F. Austin	Jaycees Field • Nacogdoches, TX	7–3	**Angelle, Chase (4–4)**	Bishop, K. (1–6)	None	331	25–17	11–9
Apr 27	at Stephen F. Austin	Jaycees Field • Nacogdoches, TX	5–4	**Warren, Lance (3–0)**	Ledet, P. (0–4)	**Wade, Derek (3)**	275	26–17	12–9
Apr 29	at UTSA*	Roadrunner Field • San Antonio, TX	2–4	Onda (3–1)	**McKinley, Jayson (1–3)**	Cox (1)	357	26–18	
Apr 30	at UTSA*	Roadrunner Field • San Antonio, TX	3–2	**Autrey, J.T. (6–2)**	Kraft (0–1)	**Wade, Derek (4)**	144	27–18	

May (4–5)
Date	Opponent	Site/stadium	Score	Win	Loss	Save	Attendance	Overall record	SLC Record
May 2	Houston Baptist	Vincent–Beck Stadium • Beaumont, TX	9–1	**Carver, David (2–1)**	Taylor Wright (2–8)	**Beasley, Andrew (1)**	821	28–18	13–9
May 3	Houston Baptist	Vincent–Beck Stadium • Beaumont, TX	3–7	Ryan Lower (6–2)	**Angelle, Chase (4–5)**	Dylan Zarosky (6)	823	28–19	13–10
May 4	Houston Baptist	Vincent–Beck Stadium • Beaumont, TX	2–13	Curtis Jones (6–3)	**Hibbs, Will (4–3)**	None	803	28–20	13–11
May 10	at Texas A&M–Corpus Christi	Chapman Field • Corpus Christi, TX	2–5	Danton, M. (7–2)	**Carver, David (2–2)**	Dorris, J. (7)		28–21	13–12
May 10	at Texas A&M–Corpus Christi	Chapman Field • Corpus Christi, TX	1–2 (10 inn)	Dorris, J. (3–1)	**Angelle, Chase (4–6)**	None	345	28–22	13–13
May 11	at Texas A&M–Corpus Christi	Chapman Field • Corpus Christi, TX	10–7	**Warren, Lance (4–0)**	Keith, K. (3–4)	None	306	29–22	14–13
May 15	at Oral Roberts	J. L. Johnson Stadium • Tulsa, OK	5–6 (12 inn)	Romano, J. (3–4)	**Moore, Travis (0–1)**	None	540	29–23	14–14
May 15	at Oral Roberts	J. L. Johnson Stadium • Tulsa, OK	5–4 (10 inn)	**Hibbs, Will (5–3)**	Giller, K. (3–4)	None	673	30–23	15–14
May 15	at Oral Roberts	J. L. Johnson Stadium • Tulsa, OK	3–1	**Perry, Hunter (3–0)**	Trujillo, G. (3–4)	None	673	31–23	16–14

Postseason (0–2)

Southland Conference Tournament (0–2)
Date	Opponent	(Seed)/Rank	Site/stadium	Score	Win	Loss	Save	Attendance	Overall record	Tournament record
May 21	vs. (1) Sam Houston State	(8)	Bear Stadium • Conway, AR	4–10	Riggs, Nolan (3–0)	**Angelle, Chase (4–7)**	None		31–24	0–1
May 21	vs. (1) Northwestern State	(8)	Bear Stadium • Conway, AR	8–10	Smith, B. (3–2)	**Beasley, Andrew (1–1)**	None		31–25	0–2
