= 2014 Southland Conference baseball tournament =

- Teams: 8
- Format: Double-elimination
- Finals site: Bear Stadium; Conway, AR
- Champions: Southeastern Louisiana (1st title)
- Winning coach: Matt Riser (1st title)
- MVP: Tate Scioneaux (Southeastern Louisiana)

2014 Southland Conference baseball standings
	Conf.				Overall
Team	W		L	PCT	W		L	PCT
Sam Houston State ‍†‍‍^{y}	22	–	8	.733	41	–	17	.707
Nicholls State ‍‍‍	21	–	9	.700	32	–	26	.552
Northwestern State ‍‍‍	19	–	11	.633	33	–	26	.559
Texas A&M–Corpus Christi ‍‍‍	19	–	11	.633	31	–	27	.534
Southeastern Louisiana ‍‍‡‍^{y}	18	–	12	.600	37	–	23	.617
Central Arkansas ‍‍‍	17	–	13	.567	32	–	22	.593
McNeese State ‍‍‍	17	–	13	.567	30	–	28	.517
Lamar ‍‍‍	16	–	14	.533	31	–	25	.554
Oral Roberts ‍‍‍	15	–	15	.500	30	–	26	.536
Houston Baptist ‍‍‍	12	–	18	.400	23	–	28	.451
Incarnate Word* ‍‍‍	9	–	15	.375	18	–	32	.360
Stephen F. Austin ‍‍‍	11	–	19	.367	20	–	35	.364
Abilene Christian* ‍‍‍	6	–	18	.250	18	–	36	.333
New Orleans ‍‍‍	2	–	28	.067	11	–	38	.224
† – Conference champion ‡ – Tournament champion y – Invited to the NCAA tournament As of May 24, 2014; Rankings from Collegiate Baseball; *Ineligible for postseason play due to Division I transition

The 2014 Southland Conference baseball tournament was held from May 21 through 24. The top eight regular season finishers of the league's fourteen teams met in the double-elimination tournament held at Bear Stadium on the campus of Central Arkansas University in Conway, Arkansas. The event returned to a campus environment for one year before again being played at neutral Sugar Land, Texas, in 2015 and 2016. Southeastern Louisiana won their first tournament championship and earned the conference's automatic bid to the 2014 NCAA Division I baseball tournament.

== Seeding and format ==
The top eight finishers from the regular season will be seeded one through eight. They will play a two bracket, double-elimination tournament, with the winner of each bracket meeting in a single championship final. Abilene Christian and Incarnate Word were ineligible for postseason play as they transition from Division II.

Team	W	L	Pct	GB	Seed
Sam Houston State	22	8	.733	–	1
Nicholls State	21	9	.700	1	2
Northwestern State	19	11	.633	3	4
Texas A&M–Corpus Christi	19	11	.633	3	3
Southeastern Louisiana	18	12	.600	4	5
Central Arkansas	17	13	.567	5	6
McNeese State	17	13	.567	5	7
Lamar	16	14	.533	6	8
Oral Roberts	15	15	.500	7	–
Houston Baptist	12	18	.400	10	–
Incarnate Word*	9	15	.375	10	–
Stephen F. Austin	11	19	.367	11	–
Abilene Christian*	6	18	.250	13	–
New Orleans	2	28	.067	20	–

== Results ==
First round
1	Sam Houston State	10
8	Lamar	4
4	Northwestern State	3
5	Southeastern Louisiana	5
8	Lamar	8
4	Northwestern State	10
3	Texas A&M–Corpus Christi	1
6	Central Arkansas	3
2	Nicholls State	2
7	McNeese State	4
3	Texas A&M–Corpus Christi	3
2	Nicholls State	2

Second round
1	Sam Houston State	0
5	Southeastern Louisiana	1
1	Sam Houston State	1
4	Northwestern State	4
6	Central Arkansas	11
7	McNeese State	3
3	Texas A&M–Corpus Christi	5
7	McNeese State	7

Semifinals
5	Southeastern Louisiana	7	—
4	Northwestern State	3	—
6	Central Arkansas	8	–
7	McNeese State	6	–

Final
5	Southeastern Louisiana	9
6	Central Arkansas	4

== All-Tournament Team ==
The following players were named to the All-Tournament Team.

Pos	Name	Team
P	Tate Scioneaux	Southeastern Louisiana
P	Jacob Seward	Southeastern Louisiana
C	Jameson Fisher	Southeastern Louisiana
OF	Andrew Godbold	Southeastern Louisiana
P	Connor McClain	Central Arkansas
OF	Doug Votolato	Central Arkansas
OF	Nate Ferrell	Central Arkansas
2B	Chris Townsend	Central Arkansas
P	Steven Spann	Northwestern State
SS	Sam Bumpers	Lamar
OF	Andrew Guillotte	McNeese State
DH	Nick Heath	Northwestern State

=== Most Valuable Player ===
Tate Scioneaux was named Tournament Most Valuable Player. Scioneaux was a pitcher for Southeastern Louisiana, pitching 11 scoreless innings over the tournament, recording 12 strikeouts while yielding nine hits and two walks.

== See also ==
2014 Southland Conference softball tournament
