= 2014 Stephen F. Austin Lumberjacks baseball team =

American college baseball season

2014 Stephen F. Austin Lumberjacks baseball
- Conference: Southland Conference
- Record: 20–32 (11–19 Southland)
- Head coach: Johnny Cardenas (6th season)
- Assistant coaches: Chris Connally (9th season); Chad Massengale (6th season); Mike Haynes (2nd season)
- Home stadium: Jaycees Field

2014 Southland Conference baseball standings
	Conf.				Overall
Team	W		L	PCT	W		L	PCT
Sam Houston State ‍†‍‍^{y}	22	–	8	.733	43	–	19	.694
Nicholls State ‍‍‍	21	–	9	.700	32	–	26	.552
Northwestern State ‍‍‍	19	–	11	.633	33	–	26	.559
Texas A&M–Corpus Christi ‍‍‍	19	–	11	.633	31	–	27	.534
Southeastern Louisiana ‍‍‡‍^{y}	18	–	12	.600	38	–	25	.603
Central Arkansas ‍‍‍	17	–	13	.567	32	–	22	.593
McNeese State ‍‍‍	17	–	13	.567	30	–	28	.517
Lamar ‍‍‍	16	–	14	.533	31	–	25	.554
Oral Roberts ‍‍‍	15	–	15	.500	30	–	26	.536
Houston Baptist ‍‍‍	12	–	18	.400	23	–	28	.451
Incarnate Word* ‍‍‍	9	–	15	.375	18	–	32	.360
Stephen F. Austin ‍‍‍	11	–	19	.367	20	–	35	.364
Abilene Christian* ‍‍‍	6	–	18	.250	18	–	36	.333
New Orleans ‍‍‍	2	–	28	.067	11	–	38	.224
† – Conference champion ‡ – Tournament champion y – Invited to the NCAA tournament Rankings from Collegiate Baseball; *Ineligible for postseason play due to Division I transition

The 2014 Stephen F. Austin Lumberjacks baseball team represented Stephen F. Austin State University in the 2014 intercollegiate baseball season. Stephen F. Austin competed in Division I of the National Collegiate Athletic Association (NCAA) as a member of the Southland Conference. The Lumberjacks played home games at Jaycees Field in Nacogdoches, Texas. Sixth year head coach Johnny Cardenas led the Lumberjacks, a former assistant coach with the Lumberjacks from 2005 through 2008.

== Personnel ==
=== Coaches ===
2014 Stephen F. Austin Lumberjacks baseball coaching staff
No.	Name	Position	Tenure	Alma mater
29	Johnny Cardenas	Head coach	6th season (Note: 9th season overall coaching with the Stephen F. Austin Lumberjacks.)	Texas Christian University
19	Chris Connally	Assistant coach	9th season	Texas Christian University
22	Chad Massengale	Assistant coach	6th season	Texas State University
4	Mike Haynes	Volunteer Assistant Coach	2nd Season	Stephen F. Austin State University

== Schedule ==
2014 Stephen F. Austin Lumberjacks baseball team game log
Date	Time	Opponent^{#}	Rank^{#}	Site/Event	TV	Win	Loss	Save	Result	Attd.	Record
February 14	3:00 PM	at Texas–Arlington		Clay Gould Ballpark • Arlington, TX		Cameron Gann (1–0)	Brad Vachon (0–1)		W 14–9	383	1–0
February 15	2:30 PM	vs. #18 Oklahoma State		Clay Gould Ballpark • Arlington, TX		Thomas Hatch (1–0)	Kyle Cross (0–1)	Brendan McCurry (1)	L 1–3	413	1–1
February 16	3:24 PM	vs. Incarnate Word		Clay Gould Ballpark • Arlington, TX		Dillon Mangham (1–0)	Jacob Potts (0–1)		W 12–5	262	2–1
February 18	2:52 PM	at #24 Texas A&M		Olsen Field at Blue Bell Park• , College Station, TX		Matt Kent (1–0)	Kevin Bishop (0–1)		L 3–12	4,066	2–2
February 21	6:05 PM	at #28 Alabama		Sewell–Thomas Stadium • Tuscaloosa, AL	ESPN3	Tyler Wiedenfeld (1–0)	Jay Shaw (0–1)	Patrick Ledet (1)	W 2–1^{(13 INN)}	3,996	3–2
February 22	2:05 PM	at #28 Alabama		Sewell–Thomas Stadium • Tuscaloosa, AL		Justin Kamplain (1–0)	Kyle Cross (0–1)		L 0–8	3,816	3–3
February 23	1:05 PM	at #28 Alabama		Sewell–Thomas Stadium • Tuscaloosa, AL		Jon Keller (2–0)	Kevin Bishop (0–2)		L 2–3^{(10 INN)}	3,337	3–4
February 27	12:30 PM	#26 Texas Tech		Jaycees Field • Nacogdoches, TX		Ty Damron (1–0)	Tyler Wiedenfeld (1–1)		L 4–5	162	3–5
February 28	12:30 PM	UT Martin		Jaycees Field • Nacogdoches, TX		Kevin Bishop (1–2)	Taylor Cox (1–1)		W 9–4	318	4–5
March 1	2:00 PM	UT Martin		Jaycees Field • Nacogdoches, TX		Fabian Arcizo (1–0)	Chris Ross (0–1)		W 10–6	385	5–5
March 1	5:15 PM	UT Martin		Jaycees Field • Nacogdoches, TX		Dillon Mangham (2–0)	Alex Martin (0–2)		W 1–0	263	6–5
March 4	6:30 PM	Arkansas–Little Rock		Jaycees Field • Nacogdoches, TX		Cancelled (weather).					
March 7	3:02 PM	at Wichita State		Eck Stadium • Wichita, KS		Cameron Gann (2–0)	AJ Ladwig (1–1)	Tyler Wiedenfeld (1)	W 1–0	2,578	7–5
March 9	2:04 PM	at Wichita State		Eck Stadium • Wichita, KS		Cale Elam (2–0)	Kyle Cross (0–3)	Foster Vielock (3)	L 3–4	N/A	7–6
March 9	3:42 PM	at Wichita State		Eck Stadium • Wichita, KS		Sam Tewes (3–1)	Dillon Mangham (2–1)		L 0–6	2,352	7–7
March 14	6:30 PM	McNeese State*		Jaycees Field • Nacogdoches, TX		Cameron Gann (3–0)	Cole Prejean (1–1)		W 5–1	227	8–7
March 15	2:00 PM	McNeese State*		Jaycees Field • Nacogdoches, TX		Steven O'Bryant (1–2)	Dillon Mangham (2–2)		L 4–5 ^{(13 INN)}	215	8–8
March 16	1:00 PM	McNeese State*		Jaycees Field • Nacogdoches, TX		Trent Fontenot (2–0)	Jarred Greene (0–1)	S. Peterson (1)	L 8–9	112	7–9
March 18	6:30 PM	at Texas Tech		Dan Law Field at Rip Griffin Park • Lubbock, TX		Matt Withrow (2–1)	Patrick Ledet (0–1)		L 4–20	1,704	8–10
March 19	2:00 PM	at Texas Tech		Dan Law Field at Rip Griffin Park • Lubbock, TX		Dillon Mangham (3–2)	Johnathon Tripp (0–1)	Tyler Wiedenfeld (2)	W 6–3	1,819	9–10
March 21	6:30 PM	Northwestern State*		Jaycees Field • Nacogdoches, TX		Steven Spann (4–3)	Chris Hassold (0–1)		L 4–5	354	9–11
March 22	2:00 PM	Northwestern State*		Jaycees Field • Nacogdoches, TX		Jarred Greene (1–1)	John Gault (2–2)	Kyle Cross (1)	W 7–5	275	10–11
March 23	1:00 PM	Northwestern State*		Jaycees Field • Nacogdoches, TX		Steven Spann (5–3)	Kevin Bishop (1–2)	Andrew Adams (1)	L 3–5	295	10–12
March 25	6:30 PM	Dallas Baptist		Jaycees Field • Nacogdoches, TX		Trevor Conn (1–1)	Halden Maynard (0–1)		L 10–20	1,116	10–13
March 29	1:00 PM	Central Arkansas*		Jaycees Field • Nacogdoches, TX		Cameron Gann (4–0)	Connor Gilmore (2–1)	Tyler Wiedenfeld (3)	W 9–6	427	11–13
March 29	4:00 PM	Central Arkansas*		Jaycees Field • Nacogdoches, TX		Dillon Mangham (4–2)	Riley Echols (1–1)	Tyler Wiedenfeld (4)	W 5–4	541	12–13
March 30	1:00 PM	Central Arkansas*		Jaycees Field • Nacogdoches, TX		Connor McClain (3–1)	Kyle Cross (0–4)		L 4–8	384	12–14
April 1	6:00 PM	at Arkansas–Little Rock		Gary Hogan Field • Little Rock, AR		Jarred Greene (2–1)	Chad Bradford (2–1)	Josh Keith (1)	W 3–1	123	13–14
April 4	6:00 PM	at Texas A&M–Corpus Christi*		Chapman Field • Corpus Christi, TX		Kaleb Keith (3–2)	Patrick Ledet (0–2)		L 8–9	377	13–15
April 5	5:00 PM	at Texas A&M–Corpus Christi*		Chapman Field • Corpus Christi, TX		Dillon Mangham (5–2)	Trevor Belicek (1–5)	Tyler Wiedenfeld (5)	W 12–10	367	14–15
April 6	1:00 PM	at Texas A&M–Corpus Christi*		Chapman Field • Corpus Christi, TX		Josh Keith (1–0)	Kaleb Keith (3–3)		W 7–6	395	15–15
April 8	6:30 PM	New Mexico		Jaycees Field • Nacogdoches, TX		Taylor Duree (2–0)	Patrick Ledet (0–3)	Victor Sanchez (4)	L 6–9	369	15–16
April 9	2:00 PM	New Mexico		Jaycees Field • Nacogdoches, TX		A. J. Carman (3–0)	Kyle Cross (0–5)	Victor Sanchez (5)	L 3–6	136	15–17
April 11	6:30 PM	Oral Roberts*		Jaycees Field • Nacogdoches, TX		Guillermo Trujillo (2–2)	Cameron Gann (4–1)		L 1–10	478	15–18
April 12	2:00 PM	Oral Roberts*		Jaycees Field • Nacogdoches, TX		Gavin Glanz (2–3)	Dillon Mangham (5–3)	Jordan Romano (8)	L 1–7	371	15–19
April 13	1:00 PM	Oral Roberts*		Jaycees Field • Nacogdoches, TX		Pepe Gomez (5–3)	Kevin Bishop (1–4)	Jordan Romano (9)	L 0–4	261	15–19
April 15	6:30 PM	at Arkansas		Baum Stadium • Fayetteville, AR		Colin Poche (3–0)	Halden Maynard (0–2)		L 2–7	2,036	15–21
April 17	6:30 PM	at Abilene Christian*		Crutcher Scott Field • Abilene, TX		Chris Hassold (1–1)	Scott Kinzler (1–1)		W 12–8	427	16–21
April 18	2:00 PM	at Abilene Christian*		Crutcher Scott Field • Abilene, TX		Brady Rodriguez (1–2)	Dillon Mangham (5–4)		L 6–8	465	16–22
April 19	1:00 PM	at Abilene Christian*		Crutcher Scott Field • Abilene, TX		Garrett deMeyere (4–4)	Kevin Bishop (1–5)		L 0–3	575	16–23
April 22	6:30 PM	at Dallas Baptist		Horner Ballpark • Dallas, TX		Brandon Koch (4–0)	Justin Hunsaker (0–1)		L 6–7	380	16–24
April 25	6:30 PM	Lamar*		Jaycees Field • Nacogdoches, TX		Dillon Mangham (6–4)	Will Hibbs (4–2)		W 10–2	307	17–24
April 26	2:00 PM	Lamar*		Jaycees Field • Nacogdoches, TX		Chase Angelle (4–4)	Kevin Bishop (1–6)		L 3–7	331	17–25
April 27	1:00 PM	Lamar*		Jaycees Field • Nacogdoches, TX		Lance Warren (3–0)	Patrick Ledet (0–4)	Derek Wade (3)	L 4–5	275	17–26
April 29	6:30 PM	TCU		Jaycees Field • Nacogdoches, TX		Jordan Kipper (7–2)	Halden Maynard (0–3)		L 4–14	592	17–27
May 2	6:30 PM	at Sam Houston State*		Don Sanders Stadium • Huntsville, TX		Tyler Eppler (6–5)	Dillon Mangham (6–5)	Ryan Brinley (7)	L 4–5	919	17–28
May 3	2:00 PM	at Sam Houston State*		Don Sanders Stadium • Huntsville, TX		Jason Simms (4–2)	Kevin Bishop (1–7)		L 1–12	965	17–29
May 4	1:00 PM	at Sam Houston State*		Don Sanders Stadium • Huntsville, TX		Nolan Riggs (2–0)	Tyler Wiedenfeld (1–2)		L 7–16	793	17–30
May 9	6:30 PM	Nicholls State*		Jaycees Field • Nacogdoches, TX		Cameron Gann (5–1)	Zach Thiac (2–4)		W 4–3	372	18–30
May 10	2:00 PM	Nicholls State*		Jaycees Field • Nacogdoches, TX		Marc Frazier (1–0)	Fabian Arcizo (1–1)	Marc Picciola (6)	L 3–5	227	18–31
May 11	1:00 PM	Nicholls State*		Jaycees Field • Nacogdoches, TX		Brandon Jackson (4–2)	Kyle Cross (0–6)	John Satriano (2)	L 3–5	209	18–32
May 13	12:30 PM	at Creighton		TD Ameritrade Park • Omaha, NE		Max Ising (2–2)	Jarred Greene (2–2)	Bryan Sova (8)	L 8–10	9,067	18–33
May 16	3:00 PM	at Houston Baptist*		Husky Field • Houston, TX		Kevin Bishop (2–7)	Curtis Jones (4–5)		W 10–3	363	19–32
May 17	2:00 PM	at Houston Baptist*		Husky Field • Houston, TX		Kyle Cross (1–6)	Ryan Lower (6–4)	Fabian Arcizo (1)	W 4–3	525	20–32
*Southland Conference game. ^{#}Rankings from Collegiate Baseball released prior to game. All times are in Central Time.
