= 2014 Abilene Christian Wildcats baseball team =

American college baseball season

2014 Abilene Christian Wildcats baseball
- Conference: Southland Conference
- Record: 12–17 (2–4 Southland)
- Head coach: Britt Bonneau (18th season)
- Assistant coach: Sean Winston (2nd season)
- Hitting coach: Brandon Stover (8th season)
- Pitching coach: Josh Scott (1st season)
- Home stadium: Crutcher Scott Field

2014 Southland Conference baseball standings
	Conf.				Overall
Team	W		L	PCT	W		L	PCT
Sam Houston State ‍†‍‍^{y}	22	–	8	.733	43	–	19	.694
Nicholls State ‍‍‍	21	–	9	.700	32	–	26	.552
Northwestern State ‍‍‍	19	–	11	.633	33	–	26	.559
Texas A&M–Corpus Christi ‍‍‍	19	–	11	.633	31	–	27	.534
Southeastern Louisiana ‍‍‡‍^{y}	18	–	12	.600	38	–	25	.603
Central Arkansas ‍‍‍	17	–	13	.567	32	–	22	.593
McNeese State ‍‍‍	17	–	13	.567	30	–	28	.517
Lamar ‍‍‍	16	–	14	.533	31	–	25	.554
Oral Roberts ‍‍‍	15	–	15	.500	30	–	26	.536
Houston Baptist ‍‍‍	12	–	18	.400	23	–	28	.451
Incarnate Word* ‍‍‍	9	–	15	.375	18	–	32	.360
Stephen F. Austin ‍‍‍	11	–	19	.367	20	–	35	.364
Abilene Christian* ‍‍‍	6	–	18	.250	18	–	36	.333
New Orleans ‍‍‍	2	–	28	.067	11	–	38	.224
† – Conference champion ‡ – Tournament champion y – Invited to the NCAA tournament Rankings from Collegiate Baseball; *Ineligible for postseason play due to Division I transition

The 2014 Abilene Christian baseball team represented Abilene Christian University in the 2014 intercollegiate baseball season. Abilene Christian competed in Division I of the National Collegiate Athletic Association (NCAA) as a charter member of the Southland Conference. The Wildcats played home games at Crutcher Scott Field on the university's campus in Abilene, Texas. Eighteenth season head coach Ty Harrington led the Wildcats.

== Personnel ==
=== Coaches ===
2014 Abilene Christian Wildcats baseball coaching staff
No.	Name	Position	Tenure	Alma mater
	Britt Bonneau	Head coach	18th season	Lubbock Christian University
	Brandon Stover	Hitting Coach	8th season	Abilene Christian University
	Josh Scott	Hitting Coach	1st season	Baylor University; Angelo State University
	Sean Winston	Volunteer Assistant Coach	2nd Season	Hawaii Pacific University

== Schedule ==
2014 Abilene Christian Wildcats baseball team game log
Date	Time	Opponent^{#}	Site/Event	Win	Loss	Save	Result	Attd.	Record
February 14	4:00 PM	Arlington Baptist	Crutcher Scott Field • Abilene, TX	Nate Cole (1–0)	Devin Patton (0–1)		W 12–2	575	1–0
February 15	1:00 PM	Arlington Baptist	Crutcher Scott Field • Abilene, TX	Garrett Demeyere (1–0)	Drew Burnett (0–1)	Kevin Sheets (1)	W 4–2	765	2–0
February 16	1:00 PM	Arlington Baptist	Crutcher Scott Field • Abilene, TX	Stuart Patke (1–0)	Caleb Sims (0–1)		W 14–4	1,255	3–0
February 21	4:00 PM	Central Arkansas	Crutcher Scott Field • Abilene, TX (Al Scott Memorial Baseball Classic)	Bryce Biggerstaff (1–1)	Nate Cole (1–1)	Ben Ancheff (2)	L 4–6	575	3–1
February 22	4:00 PM	NJIT	Crutcher Scott Field • Abilene, TX (Al Scott Memorial Baseball Classic)	Garrett Demeyere (2–0)	Ian Bentley (0–1)		W 10–1	875	4–1
February 23	4:00 PM	NJIT	Crutcher Scott Field • Abilene, TX (Al Scott Memorial Baseball Classic)	Kevin Sheets (1–0)	Jake Yanez (0–1)		W 6–5	765	5–1
February 28	7:00 PM	Missouri State	Crutcher Scott Field • Abilene, TX (Bourland-Ardoin Classic)	Cody Schumacher (3–0)	Garrett Demeyere (0–1)		L 0–12	728	5–2
March 1	3:00 PM	Grand Canyon	Crutcher Scott Field • Abilene, TX (Bourland-Ardoin Classic)	Kevin Sheets (1–0)	Scott Serigstad (0–1)		W 3–2^{(10 INN)}	751	6–2
March 5	3:01 PM	at Oklahoma	L. Dale Mitchell Baseball Park • Norman, OK	Octavio Rodriguez (1–0)	Garrett Demeyere (2–2)	Ralph Garza Jr. (2)	L 1–4	530	6–3
March 6	3:00 PM	at Oklahoma	L. Dale Mitchell Baseball Park • Norman, OK	Jacob Evans (1–1)	Nate Cole (1–2)	Ralph Garza Jr. (3)	L 1–3	524	6–4
March 7	11:00 AM	vs. Missouri State	Clay Gould Ballpark • Arlington, TX (UT Arlington Invitational)	Cody Schumacher (4–0)	Austin Lambright (0–1)		L 3–12	124	6–5
March 8	11:00 AM	vs. Utah	Clay Gould Ballpark • Arlington, TX (UT Arlington Invitational)	Luke West (1–1)	Brady Rodriguez (0–1)	Nick Green (5)	L 8–9	112	6–6
March 9	3:00 PM	at UT Arlington	Clay Gould Ballpark • Arlington, TX (UT Arlington Invitational)	Garrett Demeyere (3–2)	Brad Vachon (1–4)	Nate Cole (1)	W 2–1	374	7–6
March 11	6:33 PM	at #26 Texas Tech	Dan Law Field at Rip Griffin Park • Lubbock, TX	Dylan Dusek (2–0)	Nate Cole (1–3)		L 2–6^{(7 INN)}	2,362	7–7
March 13	3:03 PM	at #15 Oklahoma State	Allie P. Reynolds Stadium • Stillwater, OK	Garrett Williams (2–0)	Austin Lambright (0–2)		L 7–15	319	7–8
March 14	6:00 PM	East Central	Crutcher Scott Field • Abilene, TX	Lucas Kaplan (3–3)	Kevin Sheets (2–1)		L 3–8	519	7–9
March 16	2:00 PM	East Central	Crutcher Scott Field • Abilene, TX	Cam McKay (1–1)	Brady Rodriguez (0–2)		L 5–9	650	7–10
March 22	11:00 AM	at Alabama A&M	Bulldog Field • Normal, AL	Brandon Lambright (1–2)	Ryan Ahrens (1–2)	Kevin Sheets (2)	W 13–12	57	8–10
March 22	3:00 PM	at Alabama A&M	Bulldog Field • Normal, AL	Caleb Bowen (1–2)	Austin Lambright (0–1)	Rano Nelson (1)	L 1–7	53	8–11
March 23	1:00 PM	at Alabama A&M	Bulldog Field • Normal, AL	Andrew Utterback (1–0)	Stuart Patke (1–1)		L 8–9	43	8–12
March 25	5:00 PM	Texas College	Crutcher Scott Field • Abilene, TX	Austin Lambright (1–2)	Bradon Signs (0–1)		W 10–0^{(7 INN)}	575	9–12
March 25	7:30 PM	Texas College	Crutcher Scott Field • Abilene, TX	Scot Kinzler (1–0)	Gene Swartzenberg (1–3)		W 6–1^{(7 INN)}	500	10–12
March 28	6:00 PM	Incarnate Word*	Crutcher Scott Field • Abilene, TX	Geno Encina (3–4)	Nate Cole (1–4)		L 3–11	775	10–13
March 29	2:00 PM	Incarnate Word*	Crutcher Scott Field • Abilene, TX	Kevin Sheets (3–1)	Brandon Cogbill (0–3)		W 4–2	1,055	11–13
March 30	1:00 PM	Incarnate Word*	Crutcher Scott Field • Abilene, TX	Mack Morgan (1–0)	Jacob Potts (2–2)	Brady Rodriguez (1)	W 4–1	750	12–13
April 4	6:00 PM	Lamar*	Crutcher Scott Field • Abilene, TX	Will Hibbs (3–1)	Stuart Patke (1–2)	Lance Warren (1)	L 4–6	600	12–14
April 5	2:47 PM	Lamar*	Crutcher Scott Field • Abilene, TX	J.T. Autrey (4–1)	Nate Cole (1–5)	Danny Fernandez (4)	L 4–5	850	12–15
April 6	1:05 PM	Lamar*	Crutcher Scott Field • Abilene, TX	Hunter Perry (1–0)	Garrett Demeyere (3–3)		L 7–16	275	12–16
April 8	6:30 PM	at Texas Tech	Dan Law Field at Rip Griffin Park • Lubbock, TX	Dalton Brown (2–0)	Joe Gawrieh (0–1)		L 2–19	1,853	12–17
April 11	6:30 PM	at Sam Houston State*	Don Sanders Stadium • Huntsville, TX						
April 12	4:00 PM	at Sam Houston State*	Don Sanders Stadium • Huntsville, TX						
April 13	1:00 PM	at Sam Houston State*	Don Sanders Stadium • Huntsville, TX						
April 16	6:35 PM	at Texas A&M	Olsen Field at Blue Bell Park • College Station, TX						
April 17	6:00 PM	Stephen F. Austin*	Crutcher Scott Field • Abilene, TX						
April 18	2:00 PM	Stephen F. Austin*	Crutcher Scott Field • Abilene, TX						
April 19	1:00 PM	Stephen F. Austin*	Crutcher Scott Field • Abilene, TX						
April 21	3:30 PM	McMurry	Crutcher Scott Field • Abilene, TX						
April 25	2:00 PM	at Houston Baptist*	Husky Field • Houston, TX						
April 26	1:00 PM	at Houston Baptist*	Husky Field • Houston, TX						
April 27	2:00 PM	at Houston Baptist*	Husky Field • Houston, TX						
April 29	6:00 PM	UT Permian Basin	Crutcher Scott Field • Abilene, TX						
May 2	6:00 PM	Texas A&M–Corpus Christi*	Crutcher Scott Field • Abilene, TX						
May 3	2:00 PM	Texas A&M–Corpus Christi*	Crutcher Scott Field • Abilene, TX						
May 4	1:00 PM	Texas A&M–Corpus Christi*	Crutcher Scott Field • Abilene, TX						
May 9	6:30 PM	at Oral Roberts*	J. L. Johnson Stadium • Tulsa, OK						
May 10	2:00 PM	at Oral Roberts*	J. L. Johnson Stadium • Tulsa, OK						
May 11	1:00 PM	at Oral Roberts*	J. L. Johnson Stadium • Tulsa, OK						
May 15	6:30 PM	at Incarnate Word*	Sullivan Field • San Antonio, TX						
May 16	3:00 PM	at Incarnate Word*	Sullivan Field • San Antonio, TX						
May 17	1:00 PM	at Incarnate Word*	Sullivan Field • San Antonio, TX						
May 20	6:30 PM	at Arizona State	Packard Stadium • Tempe, AZ						
May 23	6:00 PM	at Arizona	Hi Corbett Field • Tucson, AZ						
May 24	6:00 PM	at Arizona	Hi Corbett Field • Tucson, AZ						
May 25	12:00 PM	at Arizona	Hi Corbett Field • Tucson, AZ						
*Southland Conference game. ^{#}Rankings from Collegiate Baseball released prior to game. All times are in Central Time.
