= Johnny Cardenas =

American college baseball coach

Biographical details
- Born: July 23, 1970 (age 55); Joliet, Illinois, U.S.

Coaching career (HC unless noted)
- 1999–2003: Colbert (OK) HS
- 2004–2005: Greenville (TX)
- 2006–2008: Stephen F. Austin (asst.)
- 2009–2024: Stephen F. Austin

Head coaching record
- Overall: 359–483
- Tournaments: Southland: 9–16; NCAA: 0–0

Accomplishments and honors

Awards
- Southland Coach of the Year (2010)

Johnny Ray Cardenas (born July 23, 1970) is an American retired college baseball coach and catcher. Cardenas was the head coach of the Stephen F. Austin Lumberjacks baseball team.

== Playing career ==
Cardenas attended Seward County Community College in Liberal, Kansas. Cardenas then transferred to Texas Christian University (TCU) to play college baseball for the Horned Frogs baseball team.

The Seattle Mariners selected Cardenas in the 46th round (1,271th overall) of the 1993 Major League Baseball draft. He began his professional career with the Bellingham Mariners of the Class A-Short Season Northwest League, where he batted .204 with two home runs. He was promoted to the Riverside Pilots of the Class A-Advanced California League in 1994. He hit .208 with one home run for Riverside.

Cardenas began the 1995 season playing with replacement players in spring training for during the ongoing strike. He played for the Port City Roosters of the Class AA Southern League in 1995. In 1996, he began the season with Port City, after batting .189 with 1 home run and 6 RBIs in 27 games with Port City, he was released. He played the rest of the 1996 season with the Oklahoma City 89ers of the American Association, an affiliate of the Texas Rangers.

Cardenas was released following the 1996 season and signed with the Duluth–Superior Dukes of the Northern League. He batted .298 with six home runs and 39 RBIs during the season. He signed with the Chicago White Sox to play the 1997 season with the Birmingham Barons during the 1998 season. He hit just .200 with 8 RBIs in 17 games.

== Coaching career ==
From 1999 to 2003, Cardenas served as the head baseball coach at Colbert High School in Colbert, Oklahoma. Cardenas then served as the head coach at Greenville High School in Greenville, Texas for two years.

In the summer of 2005, Cardenas accepted a position as an assistant coach for the Stephen F. Austin (SFA) Lumberjacks baseball team. He was an assistant for three years and was named the interim head coach when Donnie Watson's contract wasn't renewed.

On July 9, 2008, Cardenas was named the head coach of SFA. Following the 2010 season, Cardenas was named the Southland Conference Coach of the Year.

Cardenas announced on May 23, 2024, that he was retiring after 16 seasons at SFA.

== Head coaching record ==
Record table
Season	Team	Overall	Conference	Standing	Postseason
Stephen F. Austin Lumberjacks (Southland Conference) (2009–2021)
2009	Stephen F. Austin	23–32	14–18	8th	Southland Tournament
2010	Stephen F. Austin	34–20	20–12	4th	Southland Tournament
2011	Stephen F. Austin	37–23	20–13	2nd	Southland Tournament
2012	Stephen F. Austin	26–33	16–17	T-6th	Southland Tournament
2013	Stephen F. Austin	28–29	15–12	T-5th	Southland Tournament
2014	Stephen F. Austin	20–35	11–19	12th	
2015	Stephen F. Austin	17–34	11–18	10th	
2016	Stephen F. Austin	30–30	14–16	8th	Southland Tournament
2017	Stephen F. Austin	29–28	17–13	6th	Southland Tournament
2018	Stephen F. Austin	17–36	9–21	12th	
2019	Stephen F. Austin	25–33	16–14	T-5th	Southland Tournament
2020	Stephen F. Austin	6–10	3–0		Season canceled due to COVID-19
2021	Stephen F. Austin	20–31	17–22	10th	
Stephen F. Austin:			183–195		
Stephen F. Austin Lumberjacks (Western Athletic Conference) (2022–2024)
2022	Stephen F. Austin	15–37	8–22	6th (Southwest)	
2023	Stephen F. Austin	22–28	12–18	10th	
2024	Stephen F. Austin	10–44	6–24	11th	
Stephen F. Austin:		359–483	26–64		
Total:		359–483			
National champion Postseason invitational champion Conference regular season champion Conference regular season and conference tournament champion Division regular season champion Division regular season and conference tournament champion Conference tournament champion
