= Matt Riser =

American baseball coach

Current position
- Title: Head coach
- Team: Memphis
- Conference: The American
- Record: 69-99

Biographical details
- Born: June 25, 1984 (age 42); New Orleans, Louisiana, U.S.

Playing career
- 2003–2004: Pearl River Community College
- 2005–2006: Tulane

Coaching career (HC unless noted)
- 2007: Tulane (Asst.)
- 2008–2013: Southeastern Louisiana (Asst.)
- 2014–2023: Southeastern Louisiana
- 2024–present: Memphis

Head coaching record
- Overall: 389-323
- Tournaments: NCAA: 3–8

Accomplishments and honors

Championships
- 2 Southland tournament (2014, 2022); Southland regular season (2015)

Awards
- Southland Coach of the Year (2015)

Matt Riser (born June 25, 1984) is an American college baseball coach and former player, who is the current head baseball coach of the Memphis Tigers. He played college baseball at Pearl River Community College and Tulane from 2003–2006. He served as the head coach of the Southeastern Louisiana Lions (2014–2023).

He grew up in Picayune, Mississippi, where he played baseball with Major League Baseball player Rhyne Hughes. After a playing career at Pearl River Community College and Tulane and an appearance in the 2005 College World Series, Riser coached for one season as an assistant with the Green Wave under Rick Jones. He then moved to Southeastern Louisiana for six seasons. After head coach Jay Artigues resigned to become athletic director following the 2013 season, Riser was named interim head coach. Riser was made permanent on January 24, 2014, the first day of spring practice. He is the older brother of Alex Riser who served as a captain for the Pearl River Community College Wildcats Baseball Team and played under Hall of Fame Coach Hill Denson at Belhaven University.

== Head coaching record ==
Below is a table of Riser's yearly records as an NCAA head baseball coach.

Record table
Season	Team	Overall	Conference	Standing	Postseason
Southeastern Louisiana Lions (Southland Conference) (2014–2023)
2014	Southeastern Louisiana	38–25	18–12	5th	NCAA Regional
2015	Southeastern Louisiana	42–17	25–5	1st	Southland tournament
2016	Southeastern Louisiana	40–21	22–8	2nd	NCAA Regional
2017	Southeastern Louisiana	37–22	20–10	2nd	NCAA Regional
2018	Southeastern Louisiana	37–22	21–9	2nd	Southland tournament
2019	Southeastern Louisiana	33–27	19–11	T-2nd	Southland tournament
2020	Southeastern Louisiana	6–10	1–2		Season canceled due to COVID-19
2021	Southeastern Louisiana	32–24	22–17	5th	Southland tournament
2022	Southeastern Louisiana	30–31	14–10	2nd	NCAA Regional
2023	Southeastern Louisiana	25–25	9–14	8th	
Southeastern Louisiana:		320–224	171–98		
Memphis Tigers (American Athletic Conference) (2024–present)
2024	Memphis	23–32	10–17	10th	
2025	Memphis	22–33	8–19	T–9th	
2026	Memphis	24-34	13-14	5th	American tournament
Memphis:		69-99	31-50		
Total:		389–323			
National champion Postseason invitational champion Conference regular season champion Conference regular season and conference tournament champion Division regular season champion Division regular season and conference tournament champion Conference tournament champion

== See also ==
- List of current NCAA Division I baseball coaches
