= Nick Harlan =

American baseball player and coach

Current position
- Title: Head coach
- Team: Central Arkansas
- Conference: UAC
- Record: 123–150

Biographical details
- Born: Oroville, California

Playing career
- Position: First baseman

Coaching career (HC unless noted)
- 2002–2003: Feather River College (P)
- 2004–2013: York (NE)
- 2014–2021: Central Arkansas (P/AHC)
- 2022–present: Central Arkansas

Head coaching record
- Overall: 123–150 (NCAA) 363-181 (NAIA)
- Tournaments: NCAA: 0–0

Accomplishments and honors

Championships
- 3* MCAC Regular Season (2009-11); 3* MCAC Conference Tournament (2010,12-13)

Awards
- MCAC Coach of the Year (2010)

Nicholas Harlan is an American baseball coach and former first baseman, who is the current head baseball coach of the Central Arkansas Bears. He played college baseball at York College (Nebraska). He has also been the head coach of the York College Panthers (2004–2013).

== Playing career ==
Harlan attended Oroville High School and played college baseball at Feather River College and York College (Nebraska).

== Coaching career ==
Harlan began his coaching career at Feather River College during the 2002 season. He also served as an associate scout for the Philadelphia Phillies during his stint at Feather River.

Harlan was named the head baseball coach of his alma mater, the York Panthers in 2003.

In August, 2013, Harlan decided to leave York to become the pitching coach for Allen Gum at Central Arkansas. After 8 years as the pitching coach and associate head coach to Gum, Harlan was promoted to head coach upon Gum's retirement.

== Head coaching record ==
Record table
Season	Team	Overall	Conference	Standing	Postseason
York (NE) (Midlands Collegiate Athletic Conference) (2005–2013)
2004	York (NE)	33–23	14–13		
2005	York (NE)	39–17	20–7		
2006	York (NE)	31–25	13–9		
2007	York (NE)	33–23	14–9		
2008	York (NE)	28–23	10–10		
2009	York (NE)	45–7	19–1	1st	
2010	York (NE)	38–14	14–4	1st	
2011	York (NE)	42–16	13–7	1st	
2012	York (NE)	42–12	17–3		
2013	York (NE)	32–21	14–10		NAIA World Series
York (NE) (NAIA):		363–181	148–73		
Central Arkansas Bears (ASUN Conference) (2022–present)
2022	Central Arkansas	24–29	18–12	4th (West)	
2023	Central Arkansas	23–31	14–16	T-9th	
2024	Central Arkansas	26–30	12–18	8th	ASUN tournament
2025	Central Arkansas	20–35	12–18	4th (Gold)	ASUN tournament
2026	Central Arkansas	30–25	17–13	3rd (Gold)	ASUN tournament
Central Arkansas:		123–150	73–77		
Total:		123–150			
National champion Postseason invitational champion Conference regular season champion Conference regular season and conference tournament champion Division regular season champion Division regular season and conference tournament champion Conference tournament champion
