= 2007 Cal State Fullerton Titans baseball team =

American college baseball season

2007 Cal State Fullerton Titans baseball

NCAA Fullerton Super Regional champions NCAA San Diego Regional champions

College World Series, 0–2
- Conference: Big West Conference
- Record: 38–25 (10–11 Big West)
- Head coach: George Horton (11th year)
- Home stadium: Goodwin Field

2007 Big West Conference baseball standings
	Conf.				Overall
Team	W		L	PCT	W		L	PCT
No. 25 UC Riverside ‍†‍‍^{y}	16	–	5	.762	38	–	21	.644
No. 26 Long Beach State ‍‍‍^{y}	15	–	6	.714	39	–	20	.661
No. 4 UC Irvine ‍‍‍^{y}	15	–	6	.714	47	–	17	.734
Cal Poly ‍‍‍	13	–	8	.619	32	–	24	.571
No. 7 Cal State Fullerton ‍‍‍^{y}	10	–	11	.476	38	–	25	.603
UC Santa Barbara ‍‍‍	9	–	12	.429	23	–	31	.426
Cal State Northridge ‍‍‍	3	–	18	.143	15	–	41	.268
Pacific ‍‍‍	3	–	18	.143	16	–	43	.271
UC Davis ‍‍‍	0	–	0	–	24	–	32	.429
† – Conference champion y – Invited to the NCAA tournament As of June 30, 2007; Rankings from Collegiate Baseball

The 2007 Cal State Fullerton Titans baseball team represented California State University, Fullerton in the 2007 NCAA Division I baseball season. The Titans played their home games at Goodwin Field, and played as part of the Big West Conference. The team was coached by George Horton in his eleventh season as head coach at Cal State Fullerton.

The Titans reached the College World Series, their fifteenth appearance in Omaha, where they finished tied for seventh place after losing games to eventual champion Oregon State and semifinalist UC Irvine.

== Personnel ==
=== Roster ===
2007 Cal State Fullerton Titans roster
Pitchers: 9 - Ryan Ackland - Freshman; 10 - Jared Clark - Junior; 12 - Mike Anderson - Freshman; 15 - Bryan Harris - Senior; 22 - Jeff Soulages - Junior; 24 - Wes Roemer - Junior; 26 - Michael Morrison - Freshman; 27 - Travis Kelly - Freshman; 30 - Cory Arbiso - Sophomore; 31 - Adam Jorgenson - Junior; 32 - Paul Canedo - Junior; 33 - Nolan Bruyninckx - Junior; 36 - Justin Klipp - Senior; 38 - Dustin Birosak - Junior; 39 - McCullough Dean - Freshman; 40 - Brendan Hall - Freshman; 48 - Jeff Kaplan - Junior; 49 - Brad Barragar - Junior; 51 - John Basnight - Freshman; 52 - Sean Urena - Freshman	Catchers: 20 - Matt Wallach - Junior; 23 - Dustin Garneau - Sophomore; 35 - John Curtis - Senior; 46 - Billy Marcoe - Freshman; 47 - Kyle Hardman - Freshman; Outfielders: 2 - Khris Davis - Freshman; 4 - Clark Hardman - Junior; 13 - Matthew Fahey - Sophomore; 34 - Chris Jones - Sophomore; 37 - Dennis Gerbasi - Freshman; 44 - Nick Mahin - Junior; 55 - Josh Fellhauer - Freshman	Infielders: 1 - Corey Jones - Freshman; 3 - Ryan Aguayo - Freshman; 5 - Jon Wilhite - Junior; 11 - Evan McArthur - Senior; 18 - Billy Pinkerton - Freshman; 19 - Nate Bridges - Freshman; 25 - Joel Weeks - Junior; 41 - Joe Scott - Sophomore; 43 - Jake Vasquez - Senior

=== Coaches ===
2007 Cal State Fullerton Titans baseball coaching staff
- 8 - George Horton - Head coach - 11th Season
- 6 - Jason Gill - Assistant coach/Recruiting coordinator - 3rd Season
- 28 - Rick Vanderhook - Assistant coach - 21st Season
- 17 - Bill Kernen - Assistant coach - 7th Season

== Schedule and results ==
Legend
Cal State Fullerton win
Cal State Fullerton loss

2007 Cal State Fullerton Titans baseball game log
Regular season

February
Date	Opponent	Rank	Site/Stadium	Score	Overall Record	Big West Record
Feb 2	No. 23 Stanford*	No. 12	Goodwin Field • Fullerton, CA	W 11–5	1–0	
Feb 3	No. 23 Stanford*	No. 12	Goodwin Field • Fullerton, CA	W 6–5	2–0	
Feb 4	No. 23 Stanford*	No. 12	Goodwin Field • Fullerton, CA	W 12–10	3–0	
Feb 9	at UNLV*	No. 9	Earl Wilson Stadium • Paradise, NV	W 5–4	4–0	
Feb 10	at UNLV*	No. 9	Earl Wilson Stadium • Paradise, NV	W 13–4	5–0	
Feb 11	at UNLV*	No. 9	Earl Wilson Stadium • Paradise, NV	L 11–12	5–1	
Feb 16	No. 17 Arizona*	No. 8	Goodwin Field • Fullerton, CA	L 1–2	5–2	
Feb 17	No. 17 Arizona*	No. 8	Goodwin Field • Fullerton, CA	W 9–0	6–2	
Feb 18	No. 17 Arizona*	No. 8	Goodwin Field • Fullerton, CA	W 9–2	7–2	
Feb 20	at San Diego State*	No. 8	Tony Gwynn Stadium • San Diego, CA	L 7–8	7–3	
Feb 23	UCLA*	No. 8	Goodwin Field • Fullerton, CA	L 2–6	7–4	
Feb 24	at UCLA*	No. 8	Jackie Robinson Stadium • Los Angeles, CA	W 7–4	8–4	
Feb 25	at UCLA*	No. 8	Jackie Robinson Stadium • Los Angeles, CA	W 7–2	9–4	
Feb 27	San Diego State*	No. 11	Goodwin Field • Fullerton, CA	W 9–8	10–4	

March
Date	Opponent	Rank	Site/Stadium	Score	Overall Record	Big West Record
Mar 2	No. 6 Rice*	No. 11	Goodwin Field • Fullerton, CA	W 10–3	11–4	
Mar 3	No. 6 Rice*	No. 11	Goodwin Field • Fullerton, CA	L 3–9	11–5	
Mar 4	No. 6 Rice*	No. 11	Goodwin Field • Fullerton, CA	W 6–1	12–5	
Mar 9	at East Carolina*	No. 8	Clark–LeClair Stadium • Greenville, NC	L 1–6	12–6	
Mar 10	at East Carolina*	No. 8	Clark–LeClair Stadium • Greenville, NC	L 0–2	12–7	
Mar 11	at East Carolina*	No. 8	Clark–LeClair Stadium • Greenville, NC	L 5–12	12–8	
Mar 13	No. 13 Pepperdine*	No. 15	Goodwin Field • Fullerton, CA	W 9–4	13–8	
Mar 14	San Diego*	No. 15	Goodwin Field • Fullerton, CA	L 1–5	13–9	
Mar 23	at No. 18 Long Beach State*	No. 15	Blair Field • Long Beach, CA	W 7–4	14–9	
Mar 24	at No. 18 Long Beach State*	No. 16	Blair Field • Long Beach, CA	L 3–4^{14}	14–10	
Mar 25	at No. 18 Long Beach State*	No. 16	Blair Field • Long Beach, CA	W 7–5	15–10	
Mar 30	at Cal State Northridge	No. 16	Matador Field • Northridge, CA	W 4–3	16–10	1–0
Mar 31	at Cal State Northridge	No. 16	Matador Field • Northridge, CA	W 9–4	17–10	2–0

April
Date	Opponent	Rank	Site/Stadium	Score	Overall Record	Big West Record
Apr 1	at Cal State Northridge	No. 16	Matador Field • Northridge, CA	W 7–6	18–10	3–0
Apr 5	No. 24 UC Irvine	No. 17	Goodwin Field • Fullerton, CA	L 1–2	18–11	3–1
Apr 6	No. 24 UC Irvine	No. 17	Goodwin Field • Fullerton, CA	W 10–2	19–11	4–1
Apr 7	No. 24 UC Irvine	No. 17	Goodwin Field • Fullerton, CA	L 6–12	19–12	4–2
Apr 10	USC*	No. 21	Goodwin Field • Fullerton, CA	W 7–1	20–12	
Apr 13	at UC Davis*	No. 21	Dobbins Stadium • Davis, CA	W 9–2	21–12	
Apr 15	at UC Davis*	No. 21	Dobbins Stadium • Davis, CA	W 6–3	22–12	
Apr 15	at UC Davis*	No. 21	Dobbins Stadium • Davis, CA	W 9–8^{8}	23–12	
Apr 20	Pacific	No. 21	Goodwin Field • Fullerton, CA	W 18–1	24–12	5–2
Apr 21	Pacific	No. 21	Goodwin Field • Fullerton, CA	W 2–0	25–12	6–2
Apr 22	Pacific	No. 21	Goodwin Field • Fullerton, CA	W 12–1	26–12	7–2
Apr 24	at USC*	No. 14	Dedeaux Field • Los Angeles, CA	W 3–1	27–12	
Apr 27	at UC Riverside	No. 14	Riverside Sports Complex • Riverside, CA	L 2–3	27–13	7–3
Apr 28	at UC Riverside	No. 14	Riverside Sports Complex • Riverside, CA	L 0–3	27–14	7–4
Apr 29	at UC Riverside	No. 14	Riverside Sports Complex • Riverside, CA	L 4–5	27–15	7–5

May
Date	Opponent	Rank	Site/Stadium	Score	Overall Record	Big West Record
May 2	at No. 19 Pepperdine*	No. 20	Eddy D. Field Stadium • Malibu, CA	L 2–7	27–16	
May 4	UC Santa Barbara	No. 20	Goodwin Field • Fullerton, CA	W 12–1	28–16	8–5
May 5	UC Santa Barbara	No. 20	Goodwin Field • Fullerton, CA	L 9–11	28–17	8–6
May 6	UC Santa Barbara	No. 20	Goodwin Field • Fullerton, CA	L 6–7	28–18	8–7
May 8	Loyola Marymount*		Goodwin Field • Fullerton, CA	W 13–5	29–18	
May 11	at Wichita State*		Eck Stadium • Wichita, KS	W 6–2	30–18	
May 12	at Wichita State*		Eck Stadium • Wichita, KS	W 3–1	31–18	
May 13	at Wichita State*		Eck Stadium • Wichita, KS	L 0–7	31–19	
May 18	at Cal Poly	No. 24	Baggett Stadium • San Luis Obispo, CA	L 3–6	31–20	8–8
May 19	at Cal Poly	No. 24	Baggett Stadium • San Luis Obispo, CA	W 7–1	32–20	9–8
May 20	at Cal Poly	No. 24	Baggett Stadium • San Luis Obispo, CA	L 1–3	32–21	9–9
May 25	No. 16 Long Beach State		Goodwin Field • Fullerton, CA	W 7–6	33–21	10–9
May 26	No. 16 Long Beach State		Goodwin Field • Fullerton, CA	L 6–10	33–22	10–10
May 27	No. 16 Long Beach State		Goodwin Field • Fullerton, CA	L 8–11	33–23	10–11

Postseason

NCAA San Diego Regional
Date	Opponent	Rank/Seed	Site/Stadium	Score	Overall Record	Reg Record
June 1	(3) Minnesota	(2)	Tony Gwynn Stadium • San Diego, CA	W 7–1	34–23	1–0
June 2	(4) Fresno State	(2)	Tony Gwynn Stadium • San Diego, CA	W 6–4	35–23	2–0
June 3	(4) Fresno State	(2)	Tony Gwynn Stadium • San Diego, CA	W 13–2	36–23	3–0

NCAA Fullerton Super Regional
Date	Opponent	Rank/Seed	Site/Stadium	Score	Overall Record	SR Record
June 9	No. 23 UCLA	No. 18	Goodwin Field • Fullerton, CA	W 12–2	37–23	1–0
June 10	No. 23 UCLA	No. 18	Goodwin Field • Fullerton, CA	W 2–1	38–23	2–0

College World Series
Date	Opponent	Rank/Seed	Site/Stadium	Score	Overall Record	CWS Record
June 16	No. 5 Oregon State	No. 7	Johnny Rosenblatt Stadium • Omaha, NE	L 2–3	48–14	0–1
June 19	No. 4 UC Irvine	No. 7	Johnny Rosenblatt Stadium • Omaha, NE	L 4–5^{13}	50–15	0–2

== Rankings ==
Ranking movements Legend: ██ Increase in ranking ██ Decrease in ranking — = Not ranked
	Week																				
Poll	Pre	1	2	3	4	5	6	7	8	9	10	11	12	13	14	15	16	17	18	19	Final
Coaches'	8	8*	8*	8*	8*	6	15	15	15	14	18	16	14	20	—	25	—	—	—*	—*	7
Baseball America	14	12	12	10	10	7	13	13	13	12	18	17	15	—	—	—	—	—	25	9	9
Collegiate Baseball^	12	9	8	8	11	8	15	16	16	17	21	21	14	20	—	24	—	—	18	7	7
NCBWA†	9	5	5	5	9	6	12	12	14	12	18	17	14	18	25	23	29	—	22	13	10

^ Collegiate Baseball ranked 40 teams in their preseason poll, but only ranked 30 teams weekly during the season.
† NCBWA ranks 30 teams in their preseason poll, but only ranks 25 teams weekly during the season.
* A new poll was not released for this week, so for comparison purposes, the previous week's ranking is inserted in this week's slot.
