= Britt Bonneau =

American college baseball coach

Current position
- Title: Sr Analysis and Director of Player Development
- Team: Oklahoma
- Conference: SEC

Biographical details
- Born: May 11, 1970 (age 56); Dallas, Texas, U.S.
- Education: Lubbock Christian '94 (B.S.)

Playing career
- 1989–1991: Lubbock Christian
- 1992: Oklahoma

Coaching career (HC unless noted)
- 1993: UTSA (asst.)
- 1994–1995: Lubbock Christian (asst.)
- 1996: Abilene Christian (asst.)
- 1997–2018: Abilene Christian
- 2018–present: Oklahoma (asst.)

Head coaching record
- Overall: 766–511–1
- Tournaments: NCAA D2: 14–18; Lone Star: 34–19

Accomplishments and honors

Championships
- Division II South Central Regional: 2003; Lone Star Tournament: 2000, 2001, 2002, 2009, 2010; Lone Star: 2008, 2010; Lone Star South: 1998, 2000, 2001, 2002, 2004, 2005, 2007

Britt Bonneau (born May 11, 1970) is an American college baseball coach who had been the head coach at Abilene Christian (ACU) from 1997 to the competition of the 2018 season. Under Bonneau, ACU played in nine NCAA Tournaments. Previously, he was an assistant at UTSA, Lubbock Christian, and Abilene Christian. Bonneau played professional baseball in the mid-1990s after playing college baseball at Lubbock Christian and Oklahoma.In 2023 Bonneau was elected into the ACU Sports Hall of Fame.

== Playing career ==
Bonneau played college baseball at Lubbock Christian (LCU) from 1989 to 1991 and Oklahoma in 1992. At LCU in 1991, he played on an NAIA World Series team and was named a First-Team All-American. At Oklahoma in 1992, he played in the College World Series.

The Chicago Cubs signed Bonneau to a professional contract after college. He played in the Cubs' minor league system in 1993, advancing as far as short-season Geneva. He then played independent league baseball in 1994 and 1995 in the Texas–Louisiana League.

== Coaching career ==
=== Early career ===
While pursuing his professional playing career during the summers, Bonneau began his coaching career in the spring of 1993. He worked as an assistant at UTSA that year. He then spent 1994 and 1995 at Lubbock Christian, where he completed his bachelor's degree.

=== Abilene Christian ===
After his playing career ended at the end of the 1995 season, Bonneau spent the 1996 season as an assistant at Abilene Christian under Jimmy Shankle. That season, the Wildcats qualified for their first NCAA Tournament. Bonneau replaced Shankle as head coach the following season.

After missing the Lone Star Tournament in his first season as head coach, Abilene Christian had six consecutive 40-win seasons from 1998 to 2003. This included a string of four consecutive NCAA Tournaments from 2000 to 2003 that culminated in a College World Series appearance in 2003. From 2000 to 2002, the Wildcats won three straight Lone Star South Division and Tournament titles. It won neither in 2003 but received an at-large bid to the NCAA Tournament. In the 2003 South Regional, ACU won its first two games, 9–5 over Central Oklahoma and 14–5 over Delta State. It defeated Delta State again in the regional title game to advance to the College World Series, the program's first. There, it lost consecutive games to Tampa and UC Davis. After going 31–25 in 2004, Abilene Christian had another stretch of six straight 40-win seasons that culminated in a 50-win season in 2010. In that stretch, ACU won another three divisions titles, two conference titles, and two conference tournament titles.

In 2014, Abilene Christian joined Division I. In the Southland Conference, the Wildcats finished 13th after an 18–36 overall season.

On May 19, 2018, Bonneau resigned as the head coach of Abilene Christian. Bonneau now works as a volunteer assistant coach at OU.

== Head coaching record ==
Below is a table of Bonneau's records as a collegiate head baseball coach.

Record table
Season	Team	Overall	Conference	Standing	Postseason
Abilene Christian Wildcats (Lone Star Conference) (1997–2013)
1997	Abilene Christian	34–22	8–12	5th	
1998	Abilene Christian	41–17	15–5	1st (South)	Lone Star Tournament
1999	Abilene Christian	41–19	12–6	2nd (South)	Lone Star Tournament
2000	Abilene Christian	41–16–1	12–8	T–1st (South)	NCAA Regional
2001	Abilene Christian	43–17	19–5	1st (South)	NCAA Regional
2002	Abilene Christian	45–14	17–6	1st (South)	NCAA Regional
2003	Abilene Christian	45–20	15–8	2nd (South)	College World Series
2004	Abilene Christian	31–25	16–8	T–1st (South)	Lone Star Tournament
2005	Abilene Christian	42–17	16–4	1st (South)	NCAA Regional
2006	Abilene Christian	44–18	13–7	2nd (South)	NCAA Regional
2007	Abilene Christian	47–13	17–3	1st (South)	Lone Star Tournament
2008	Abilene Christian	44–17	35–7	1st	NCAA Regional
2009	Abilene Christian	44–19	30–14	3rd	NCAA Regional
2010	Abilene Christian	50–15	28–11	1st	NCAA Regional
2011	Abilene Christian	24–23	16–17	9th	
2012	Abilene Christian	26–28	11–17	6th	Lone Star Tournament
2013	Abilene Christian	29–24	15–13	T–4th	Lone Star Tournament
Abilene Christian Wildcats (Southland Conference) (2014–2018)
2014	Abilene Christian	18–36	6–18	13th	Ineligible
2015	Abilene Christian	17–38	13–17	9th	Ineligible
2016	Abilene Christian	16–37	5–22	12th	Ineligible
2017	Abilene Christian	13–43	3–27	13th	Ineligible
2018	Abilene Christian	21–33	3–25	13th	
Abilene Christian:		766–511–1 (.600)	325–260 (.556)		
Total:		766–511–1 (.600)			
National champion Postseason invitational champion Conference regular season champion Conference regular season and conference tournament champion Division regular season champion Division regular season and conference tournament champion Conference tournament champion

== See also ==
- Abilene Christian Wildcats
