= Jay Artigues =

American athletic director and former college baseball head coach

Current position
- Title: Athletic director
- Team: Southeastern Louisiana
- Conference: Southland

Biographical details
- Born: December 13, 1968 (age 57)

Playing career
- 1989–1990: Pearl River CC
- 1991–1992: Belhaven

Coaching career (HC unless noted)
- 1992–1993: Spring Hill (asst.)
- 1994–1996: St. Louis Catholic HS
- 1997–1998: Saint Thomas Aquinas HS
- 1998: New Orleans (asst.)
- 1999–2001: Bossier Parish CC
- 2002–2005: Pearl River CC
- 2006–2013: Southeastern Louisiana

Administrative career (AD unless noted)
- 2013–present: Southeastern Louisiana

Head coaching record
- Overall: 276–188 (Division I only)

Accomplishments and honors

Awards
- LSWA Co-Coach of the Year (2010)

Jay Artigues (born December 13, 1968) is the current director of athletics for Southeastern Louisiana University. He previously served as head baseball coach at Southeastern Louisiana from 2006 to 2013, prior to his appointment as athletic director. During his eight years as coach of the Lions, he compiled an overall record of 276–188.

== Head coaching record ==
Record table
Season	Team	Overall	Conference	Standing	Postseason
Southeastern Louisiana Lions (Southland Conference) (2006–2013)
2006	Southeastern Louisiana	23–32	14–16		
2007	Southeastern Louisiana	34–21	16–14		
2008	Southeastern Louisiana	32–27	17–16		
2009	Southeastern Louisiana	37–22	21–12		
2010	Southeastern Louisiana	40–19	21–12		
2011	Southeastern Louisiana	35–22	18–14		
2012	Southeastern Louisiana	39–21	20–13	2nd	
2013	Southeastern Louisiana	36–24	18–7		
Southeastern Louisiana:		276–188	145–104		
Total:		276–188			
National champion Postseason invitational champion Conference regular season champion Conference regular season and conference tournament champion Division regular season champion Division regular season and conference tournament champion Conference tournament champion
