= 2007 NCAA Division I baseball season =

Baseball season

- Duration: January 25-June 24, 2007
- Number of teams: 293
- Preseason No. 1: Rice

Tournament
- Duration: June 1–June 24, 2007
- Most conference bids: ACC (7)

College World Series
- Duration: June 15–June 24, 2007
- Champions: Oregon State (2nd title)
- Runners-up: North Carolina (6th CWS Appearance)
- Winning coach: Pat Casey (2nd title)
- MOP: Jorge Reyes (Oregon State)

Seasons
- ← 2006 2008 →

The 2007 NCAA Division I baseball season play of college baseball in the United States, organized by the National Collegiate Athletic Association (NCAA) at the Division I level, began on January 25, 2007. The season progressed through the regular season, many conference tournaments and championship series, and concluded with the 2007 NCAA Division I baseball tournament and 2007 College World Series. The College World Series, which consisted of the eight remaining teams in the NCAA tournament, was held in its annual location of Omaha, Nebraska, at Rosenblatt Stadium. It concluded on June 24, 2007, with the final game of the best of three championship series. Oregon State defeated North Carolina two games to none to claim their second consecutive championship, which was also their second overall.

== Realignment ==
=== New programs ===
Two programs, Central Arkansas and NJIT, moved from Division II to Division I for the 2007 season.

=== Dropped programs ===
Birmingham–Southern, which had competed in the Big South Conference, dropped to the Division III Southern Collegiate Athletic Conference for the 2007 season. St. Francis (NY) dropped its varsity intercollegiate baseball program following the 2006 season.

=== Conference changes ===
The Sun Belt Conference added two members, Florida Atlantic from the Atlantic Sun Conference and Louisiana–Monroe from the Southland Conference.

The Southland added two members, Texas A&M–Corpus Christi (formerly a Division I independent) and Central Arkansas (formerly of Division II).

Two schools became Division I independents– Chicago State, which moved from the Mid-Continent Conference, and NJIT, which moved from Division II.

=== Conference formats ===
The Southland Conference, whose membership changes left it with 12 baseball-sponsoring members, split into two six-team divisions.

== Conference standings ==
America East Conference
| | Conf | | | Overall | | |
| Team | W | L | Pct | W | L | Pct |
| Binghamton | 17 | 5 | .773 | 28 | 19 | .596 |
| Stony Brook | 16 | 7 | .696 | 31 | 24 | .564 |
| Albany | 13 | 11 | .542 | 29 | 29 | .500 |
| Maine | 12 | 11 | .522 | 22 | 31 | .415 |
| Vermont | 10 | 13 | .435 | 21 | 29 | .420 |
| Hartford | 9 | 14 | .391 | 15 | 34 | .306 |
| UMBC | 4 | 20 | .167 | 13 | 40 | .245 |

Atlantic 10 Conference
| | Conf | | | Overall | | |
| Team | W | L | Pct | W | L | Pct |
| Charlotte | 23 | 4 | .852 | 49 | 12 | .803 |
| Fordham | 19 | 8 | .704 | 35 | 22 | .614 |
| Richmond | 18 | 9 | .667 | 32 | 28 | .533 |
| Xavier | 17 | 10 | .630 | 29 | 31 | .483 |
| Rhode Island | 16 | 11 | .593 | 23 | 30 | .434 |
| St. Bonaventure | 14 | 12 | .538 | 25 | 27 | .481 |
| George Washington | 14 | 13 | .519 | 23 | 31 | .426 |
| Massachusetts | 13 | 14 | .481 | 22 | 25 | .468 |
| Saint Louis | 12 | 14 | .462 | 16 | 37 | .302 |
| Duquesne | 10 | 17 | .370 | 22 | 29 | .431 |
| Dayton | 9 | 18 | .333 | 21 | 33 | .389 |
| Temple | 9 | 18 | .333 | 18 | 37 | .327 |
| La Salle | 8 | 19 | .296 | 17 | 32 | .347 |
| Saint Joseph's | 6 | 21 | .222 | 10 | 39 | .204 |

Atlantic Coast Conference
| | Conf | | | Overall | | |
| Team | W | L | Pct | W | L | Pct |
Atlantic
| Florida State | 24 | 6 | .800 | 49 | 13 | .790 |
| Clemson | 18 | 12 | .600 | 41 | 23 | .641 |
| North Carolina State | 16 | 14 | .533 | 38 | 23 | .623 |
| Wake Forest | 14 | 16 | .467 | 34 | 29 | .540 |
| Boston College | 12 | 17 | .414 | 24 | 27 | .471 |
| Maryland | 7 | 23 | .233 | 26 | 30 | .464 |
Coastal
| North Carolina | 21 | 9 | .700 | 57 | 16 | .781 |
| Virginia | 19 | 9 | .679 | 45 | 16 | .738 |
| Miami (FL) | 17 | 13 | .567 | 37 | 24 | .606 |
| Georgia Tech | 15 | 14 | .517 | 32 | 25 | .561 |
| Duke | 8 | 22 | .267 | 29 | 25 | .537 |
| Virginia Tech | 7 | 23 | .233 | 23 | 31 | .426 |

Atlantic Sun Conference
| | Conf | | | Overall | | |
| Team | W | L | Pct | W | L | Pct |
| Stetson | 21 | 6 | .778 | 42 | 21 | .667 |
| Mercer | 17 | 10 | .630 | 33 | 25 | .569 |
| Belmont | 16 | 11 | .593 | 34 | 26 | .567 |
| Jacksonville | 15 | 12 | .556 | 34 | 28 | .548 |
| Kennesaw State | 13 | 14 | .481 | 32 | 23 | .58 |
| North Florida | 13 | 14 | .481 | 24 | 32 | .429 |
| Lipscomb | 12 | 15 | .444 | 28 | 30 | .483 |
| Gardner–Webb | 12 | 15 | .444 | 26 | 32 | .448 |
| East Tennessee State | 11 | 16 | .407 | 26 | 29 | .473 |
| Campbell | 5 | 22 | .185 | 11 | 45 | .196 |

Big East Conference
| | Conf | | | Overall | | |
| Team | W | L | Pct | W | L | Pct |
| St. John's | 20 | 7 | .741 | 41 | 19 | .683 |
| Rutgers | 20 | 7 | .741 | 42 | 21 | .667 |
| Louisville | 19 | 8 | .704 | 47 | 24 | .662 |
| Pittsburgh | 15 | 11 | .577 | 27 | 27 | .500 |
| South Florida | 13 | 14 | .481 | 34 | 26 | .567 |
| Villanova | 12 | 15 | .444 | 29 | 25 | .537 |
| Notre Dame | 11 | 15 | .423 | 28 | 28 | .500 |
| Connecticut | 10 | 14 | .417 | 34 | 27 | .557 |
| West Virginia | 10 | 16 | .385 | 29 | 22 | .569 |
| Cincinnati | 10 | 16 | .385 | 28 | 28 | .500 |
| Seton Hall | 9 | 15 | .375 | 25 | 25 | .500 |
| Georgetown | 8 | 19 | .296 | 21 | 34 | .382 |

Big South Conference
| | Conf | | | Overall | | |
| Team | W | L | Pct | W | L | Pct |
| Coastal Carolina | 17 | 4 | .810 | 50 | 13 | .794 |
| Winthrop | 15 | 6 | .714 | 33 | 27 | .550 |
| Liberty | 14 | 7 | .667 | 36 | 25 | .590 |
| VMI | 10 | 11 | .476 | 34 | 21 | .523 |
| High Point | 10 | 11 | .476 | 27 | 30 | .474 |
| UNC Asheville | 9 | 12 | .429 | 22 | 38 | .367 |
| Charleston Southern | 7 | 14 | .333 | 22 | 34 | .393 |
| Radford | 2 | 19 | .095 | 10 | 36 | .217 |

Big Ten Conference
| | Conf | | | Overall | | |
| Team | W | L | Pct | W | L | Pct |
| Michigan | 21 | 7 | .750 | 42 | 29 | .592 |
| Penn State | 20 | 10 | .667 | 31 | 26 | .544 |
| Minnesota | 18 | 9 | .667 | 41 | 18 | .695 |
| Iowa | 17 | 13 | .567 | 31 | 23 | .574 |
| Illinois | 16 | 14 | .533 | 31 | 27 | .534 |
| Ohio State | 15 | 15 | .500 | 38 | 24 | .613 |
| Michigan State | 15 | 16 | .484 | 25 | 26 | .490 |
| Purdue | 11 | 20 | .355 | 22 | 32 | .407 |
| Northwestern | 9 | 23 | .281 | 18 | 36 | .333 |
| Indiana | 8 | 23 | .258 | 19 | 35 | .352 |

Big West Conference
| | Conf | | | Overall | | |
| Team | W | L | Pct | W | L | Pct |
| UC Riverside | 16 | 5 | .762 | 38 | 21 | .644 |
| UC Irvine | 15 | 6 | .714 | 47 | 17 | .734 |
| Long Beach State | 15 | 6 | .714 | 39 | 20 | .661 |
| Cal Poly | 13 | 8 | .619 | 32 | 24 | .571 |
| Cal State Fullerton | 10 | 11 | .476 | 38 | 25 | .603 |
| UC Santa Barbara | 9 | 12 | .429 | 23 | 31 | .426 |
| Pacific | 3 | 18 | .143 | 16 | 43 | .271 |
| Cal State Northridge | 3 | 18 | .143 | 15 | 41 | .268 |

Big 12 Conference
| | Conf | | | Overall | | |
| Team | W | L | Pct | W | L | Pct |
| Texas | 21 | 6 | .778 | 46 | 17 | .730 |
| Missouri | 19 | 8 | .704 | 42 | 18 | .700 |
| Oklahoma State | 16 | 11 | .593 | 42 | 21 | .667 |
| Nebraska | 14 | 13 | .519 | 32 | 27 | .542 |
| Texas A&M | 13 | 13 | .500 | 48 | 19 | .716 |
| Baylor | 12 | 15 | .444 | 35 | 27 | .565 |
| Oklahoma | 11 | 16 | .407 | 34 | 24 | .586 |
| Kansas State | 10 | 16 | .385 | 34 | 24 | .586 |
| Kansas | 9 | 17 | .346 | 28 | 30 | .483 |
| Texas Tech | 8 | 18 | .308 | 28 | 27 | .509 |

Colonial Athletic Association
| | Conf | | | Overall | | |
| Team | W | L | Pct | W | L | Pct |
| Virginia Commonwealth | 18 | 11 | .621 | 37 | 23 | .617 |
| Old Dominion | 18 | 11 | .621 | 35 | 24 | .593 |
| Delaware | 18 | 11 | .621 | 32 | 23 | .582 |
| UNC Wilmington | 18 | 11 | .621 | 29 | 27 | .518 |
| George Mason | 14 | 14 | .500 | 27 | 27 | .500 |
| Georgia State | 15 | 15 | .500 | 26 | 32 | .448 |
| William & Mary | 13 | 16 | .448 | 29 | 25 | .537 |
| Northeastern | 12 | 17 | .414 | 24 | 22 | .522 |
| James Madison | 11 | 17 | .393 | 22 | 23 | .489 |
| Towson | 11 | 18 | .379 | 21 | 30 | .412 |
| Hofstra | 11 | 18 | .379 | 20 | 34 | .370 |

Conference USA
| | Conf | | | Overall | | |
| Team | W | L | Pct | W | L | Pct |
| Rice | 22 | 2 | .917 | 56 | 14 | .800 |
| East Carolina | 14 | 9 | .609 | 40 | 23 | .635 |
| Southern Miss | 14 | 10 | .583 | 39 | 23 | .629 |
| Memphis | 12 | 12 | .500 | 36 | 27 | .571 |
| Houston | 12 | 12 | .500 | 28 | 28 | .500 |
| UAB | 12 | 12 | .500 | 25 | 33 | .431 |
| Tulane | 9 | 15 | .375 | 34 | 26 | .567 |
| Central Florida | 7 | 17 | .292 | 27 | 32 | .458 |
| Marshall | 5 | 18 | .217 | 21 | 32 | .396 |

Horizon League
| | Conf | | | Overall | | |
| Team | W | L | Pct | W | L | Pct |
| Illinois–Chicago | 21 | 6 | .778 | 35 | 21 | .625 |
| Wright State | 21 | 9 | .700 | 36 | 22 | .621 |
| Wisconsin–Milwaukee | 16 | 14 | .533 | 35 | 22 | .614 |
| Cleveland State | 10 | 17 | .370 | 14 | 44 | .241 |
| Butler | 10 | 20 | .333 | 22 | 33 | .400 |
| Youngstown State | 9 | 21 | .300 | 19 | 37 | .339 |

Ivy League
| | Conf | | | | Overall | |
| Team | W | L | Pct | W | L | Pct |
Lou Gehrig
| Penn | 12 | 8 | .600 | 20 | 19 | .513 |
| Princeton | 11 | 9 | .550 | 15 | 24 | .385 |
| Columbia | 10 | 10 | .500 | 16 | 28 | .364 |
| Cornell | 8 | 12 | .400 | 15 | 23 | .395 |
Red Rolfe
| Brown | 14 | 6 | .700 | 27 | 21 | .563 |
| Harvard | 12 | 8 | .600 | 18 | 18 | .500 |
| Yale | 8 | 12 | .400 | 16 | 27 | .372 |
| Dartmouth | 5 | 15 | .250 | 8 | 29 | .216 |

Metro Atlantic Athletic Conference
| | Conf | | | Overall | | |
| Team | W | L | Pct | W | L | Pct |
| Le Moyne | 22 | 3 | .880 | 34 | 19 | .642 |
| Manhattan | 21 | 5 | .808 | 35 | 19 | .648 |
| Marist | 14 | 12 | .538 | 21 | 32 | .396 |
| Canisius | 13 | 12 | .520 | 20 | 35 | .363 |
| Saint Peter's | 13 | 13 | .500 | 23 | 29 | .442 |
| Fairfield | 12 | 14 | .462 | 18 | 28 | .391 |
| Rider | 11 | 15 | .423 | 20 | 29 | .408 |
| Siena | 10 | 14 | .417 | 12 | 33 | .267 |
| Iona | 8 | 18 | .308 | 16 | 35 | .314 |
| Niagara | 3 | 21 | .125 | 15 | 32 | .319 |

Mid-American Conference
| | Conf | | | Overall | | |
| Team | W | L | Pct | W | L | Pct |
East
| Kent State | 19 | 8 | .704 | 33 | 26 | .559 |
| Miami (OH) | 16 | 9 | .640 | 32 | 24 | .571 |
| Buffalo | 11 | 16 | .407 | 16 | 35 | .314 |
| Akron | 8 | 16 | .333 | 23 | 24 | .489 |
| Ohio | 8 | 19 | .296 | 23 | 31 | .426 |
| Bowling Green | 7 | 20 | .259 | 22 | 32 | .407 |
West
| Eastern Michigan | 21 | 4 | .840 | 32 | 24 | .571 |
| Central Michigan | 21 | 6 | .778 | 35 | 21 | .625 |
| Northern Illinois | 16 | 11 | .593 | 34 | 24 | .586 |
| Toledo | 14 | 13 | .519 | 26 | 28 | .481 |
| Western Michigan | 8 | 16 | .333 | 16 | 33 | .327 |
| Ball State | 8 | 19 | .296 | 20 | 34 | .370 |

Mid-Continent Conference
| | Conf | | | Overall | | |
| Team | W | L | Pct | W | L | Pct |
| Oral Roberts | 19 | 1 | .950 | 40 | 17 | .702 |
| Western Illinois | 11 | 9 | .550 | 31 | 26 | .544 |
| Valparaiso | 10 | 10 | .500 | 22 | 34 | .393 |
| Centenary | 9 | 11 | .450 | 28 | 31 | .475 |
| Southern Utah | 6 | 14 | .300 | 11 | 45 | .196 |
| Oakland | 5 | 15 | .250 | 20 | 34 | .370 |

Mid-Eastern Athletic Conference
| | Conf | | | Overall | | |
| Team | W | L | Pct | W | L | Pct |
| Bethune–Cookman | 16 | 1 | .941 | 33 | 27 | .550 |
| North Carolina A&T | 11 | 7 | .611 | 28 | 31 | .476 |
| Florida A&M | 11 | 7 | .611 | 16 | 36 | .308 |
| Delaware State | 10 | 8 | .556 | 22 | 27 | .449 |
| Norfolk State | 9 | 8 | .529 | 25 | 25 | .500 |
| Maryland–Eastern Shore | 5 | 13 | .278 | 10 | 45 | .182 |
| Coppin State | 0 | 18 | .000 | 0 | 44 | .000 |

Missouri Valley Conference
| | Conf | | | Overall | | |
| Team | W | L | Pct | W | L | Pct |
| Wichita State | 20 | 4 | .833 | 53 | 22 | .707 |
| Creighton | 19 | 5 | .792 | 45 | 16 | .738 |
| Southern Illinois | 13 | 11 | .542 | 34 | 22 | .607 |
| Bradley | 13 | 11 | .542 | 32 | 21 | .604 |
| Evansville | 13 | 11 | .542 | 35 | 23 | .603 |
| Northern Iowa | 8 | 16 | .333 | 23 | 28 | .451 |
| Illinois State | 8 | 16 | .333 | 20 | 32 | .385 |
| Indiana State | 7 | 17 | .292 | 26 | 26 | .500 |
| Missouri State | 7 | 17 | .292 | 23 | 34 | .404 |

Mountain West Conference
| | Conf | | | Overall | | |
| Team | W | L | Pct | W | L | Pct |
| Texas Christian | 20 | 3 | .870 | 48 | 14 | .774 |
| Brigham Young | 17 | 7 | .708 | 37 | 20 | .649 |
| San Diego State | 12 | 12 | .500 | 29 | 30 | .492 |
| New Mexico | 12 | 12 | .500 | 28 | 30 | .483 |
| Utah | 12 | 12 | .500 | 24 | 31 | .436 |
| UNLV | 10 | 14 | .417 | 24 | 36 | .400 |
| Air Force | 0 | 23 | .000 | 8 | 44 | .154 |

Northeast Conference
| | Conf | | | Overall | | |
| Team | W | L | Pct | W | L | Pct |
| Quinnipiac | 21 | 7 | .750 | 29 | 18 | .617 |
| Mount St. Mary's | 21 | 7 | .750 | 35 | 22 | .614 |
| Monmouth | 17 | 10 | .630 | 36 | 24 | .600 |
| Central Connecticut | 14 | 14 | .500 | 26 | 26 | .500 |
| Sacred Heart | 12 | 15 | .444 | 22 | 31 | .415 |
| Wagner | 11 | 17 | .393 | 17 | 34 | .333 |
| Long Island | 10 | 17 | .370 | 16 | 35 | .314 |
| Fairleigh Dickinson | 4 | 23 | .148 | 9 | 45 | .167 |

Ohio Valley Conference
| | Conf | | | Overall | | |
| Team | W | L | Pct | W | L | Pct |
| Austin Peay | 19 | 8 | .704 | 40 | 22 | .645 |
| Jacksonville State | 18 | 9 | .667 | 33 | 27 | .550 |
| Southeast Missouri State | 16 | 10 | .615 | 32 | 24 | .571 |
| Samford | 14 | 13 | .519 | 32 | 28 | .533 |
| Eastern Kentucky | 12 | 12 | .500 | 24 | 29 | .453 |
| Missouri State | 12 | 13 | .480 | 18 | 35 | .340 |
| Eastern Illinois | 12 | 14 | .462 | 23 | 28 | .451 |
| Tennessee Tech | 12 | 15 | .444 | 26 | 28 | .481 |
| Morehead State | 9 | 18 | .333 | 16 | 36 | .308 |
| Tennessee–Martin | 7 | 19 | .269 | 19 | 36 | .345 |

Pacific-10 Conference
| | Conf | | | Overall | | |
| Team | W | L | Pct | W | L | Pct |
| Arizona State | 19 | 5 | .792 | 49 | 15 | .766 |
| Arizona | 15 | 9 | .625 | 42 | 17 | .712 |
| UCLA | 14 | 10 | .583 | 33 | 28 | .541 |
| California | 12 | 12 | .500 | 29 | 26 | .527 |
| Washington | 11 | 13 | .458 | 29 | 27 | .518 |
| Oregon State | 10 | 14 | .417 | 49 | 18 | .731 |
| Washington State | 10 | 14 | .417 | 28 | 26 | .519 |
| Stanford | 9 | 15 | .375 | 28 | 28 | .500 |
| Southern California | 8 | 16 | .333 | 27 | 29 | .482 |

Patriot League
| | Conf | | | Overall | | |
| Team | W | L | Pct | W | L | Pct |
| Lafayette | 17 | 3 | .850 | 33 | 20 | .623 |
| Army | 12 | 7 | .632 | 25 | 23 | .521 |
| Navy | 12 | 8 | .600 | 35 | 20 | .636 |
| Holy Cross | 8 | 11 | .421 | 12 | 23 | .343 |
| Bucknell | 8 | 12 | .400 | 16 | 24 | .400 |
| Lehigh | 2 | 18 | .100 | 13 | 30 | .302 |

Southeastern Conference
| Team | W | L | Pct | W | L | Pct |
East
| Vanderbilt | 22 | 8 | .733 | 54 | 13 | .806 |
| South Carolina | 17 | 13 | .567 | 46 | 20 | .697 |
| Florida | 15 | 15 | .500 | 29 | 30 | .492 |
| Tennessee | 13 | 15 | .464 | 34 | 25 | .576 |
| Kentucky | 13 | 16 | .448 | 34 | 19 | .642 |
| Georgia | 11 | 19 | .367 | 23 | 33 | .411 |
East
| Arkansas | 18 | 12 | .600 | 43 | 21 | .672 |
| Mississippi State | 15 | 13 | .536 | 38 | 22 | .633 |
| Ole Miss | 16 | 14 | .533 | 40 | 25 | .615 |
| Alabama | 15 | 15 | .500 | 31 | 26 | .544 |
| LSU | 12 | 17 | .414 | 29 | 26 | .527 |
| Auburn | 10 | 20 | .333 | 31 | 25 | .554 |

Southern Conference
| | Conf | | | Overall | | |
| Team | W | L | Pct | W | L | Pct |
| Western Carolina | 20 | 7 | .741 | 42 | 20 | .677 |
| College of Charleston | 20 | 7 | .741 | 39 | 19 | .672 |
| Elon | 15 | 12 | .556 | 32 | 29 | .523 |
| Appalachian State | 14 | 13 | .519 | 33 | 26 | .559 |
| UNC Greensboro | 14 | 13 | .519 | 30 | 30 | .500 |
| Georgia Southern | 13 | 14 | .481 | 34 | 28 | .548 |
| The Citadel | 12 | 15 | .444 | 34 | 27 | .557 |
| Furman | 11 | 16 | .407 | 19 | 36 | .345 |
| Wofford | 8 | 19 | .296 | 30 | 33 | .476 |
| Davidson | 8 | 19 | .296 | 19 | 34 | .358 |

Southland Conference
| | Conf | | | Overall | | |
| Team | W | L | Pct | W | L | Pct |
East
| Lamar | 20 | 10 | .667 | 34 | 25 | .576 |
| McNeese State | 17 | 12 | .586 | 21 | 35 | .375 |
| Southeastern Louisiana | 16 | 14 | .533 | 34 | 21 | .618 |
| Northwestern State | 15 | 14 | .517 | 25 | 28 | .472 |
| Central Arkansas | 10 | 20 | .333 | 21 | 32 | .396 |
| Nicholls State | 6 | 24 | .200 | 10 | 45 | .182 |
West
| Texas–San Antonio | 24 | 6 | .800 | 36 | 22 | .621 |
| Texas State | 20 | 10 | .667 | 37 | 23 | .617 |
| Sam Houston State | 18 | 12 | .600 | 40 | 24 | .625 |
| Stephen F. Austin | 17 | 13 | .567 | 31 | 28 | .525 |
| Texas A&M–Corpus Christi | 12 | 18 | .400 | 27 | 29 | .482 |
| Texas–Arlington | 4 | 26 | .133 | 13 | 40 | .245 |

Southwestern Athletic Conference
| | Conf | | | Overall | | |
| Team | W | L | Pct | W | L | Pct |
East
| Jackson State | 17 | 7 | .708 | 33 | 23 | .589 |
| Alcorn State | 15 | 9 | .625 | 25 | 20 | .556 |
| Mississippi Valley State | 14 | 10 | .583 | 19 | 36 | .345 |
| Alabama State | 7 | 14 | .333 | 12 | 25 | .324 |
| Alabama A&M | 4 | 17 | .190 | 10 | 29 | .256 |
West
| Prairie View A&M | 17 | 7 | .708 | 34 | 25 | .576 |
| Southern | 15 | 9 | .625 | 26 | 18 | .591 |
| Arkansas–Pine Bluff | 10 | 14 | .417 | 14 | 30 | .318 |
| Grambling State | 9 | 15 | .375 | 18 | 29 | .383 |
| Texas Southern | 9 | 15 | .375 | 13 | 28 | .317 |

Sun Belt Conference
| | Conf | | | Overall | | |
| Team | W | L | Pct | W | L | Pct |
| Louisiana–Lafayette | 23 | 7 | .767 | 45 | 17 | .726 |
| New Orleans | 16 | 14 | .533 | 38 | 26 | .594 |
| Troy | 16 | 14 | .533 | 34 | 27 | .557 |
| Middle Tennessee | 16 | 14 | .533 | 32 | 28 | .533 |
| Louisiana–Monroe | 15 | 14 | .517 | 29 | 28 | .518 |
| Florida Atlantic | 15 | 15 | .500 | 36 | 22 | .621 |
| Western Kentucky | 15 | 15 | .500 | 25 | 30 | .455 |
| South Alabama | 13 | 16 | .448 | 31 | 26 | .544 |
| Arkansas State | 13 | 17 | .433 | 23 | 32 | .418 |
| Florida International | 12 | 17 | .414 | 26 | 29 | .473 |
| Arkansas–Little Rock | 9 | 20 | .310 | 21 | 31 | .404 |

Western Athletic Conference
| | Conf | | | Overall | | |
| Team | W | L | Pct | W | L | Pct |
| Fresno State | 17 | 7 | .708 | 38 | 29 | .667 |
| Nevada | 15 | 9 | .625 | 35 | 26 | .574 |
| Louisiana Tech | 14 | 10 | .583 | 35 | 24 | .593 |
| Hawaii | 11 | 13 | .458 | 34 | 25 | .576 |
| San Jose State | 11 | 13 | .458 | 34 | 26 | .567 |
| Sacramento State | 10 | 14 | .417 | 17 | 40 | .298 |
| New Mexico State | 6 | 18 | .250 | 22 | 34 | .393 |

West Coast Conference
| | Conf | | | Overall | | |
| Team | W | L | Pct | W | L | Pct |
| San Diego | 18 | 3 | .857 | 43 | 18 | .705 |
| Gonzaga | 15 | 6 | .714 | 33 | 25 | .569 |
| Pepperdine | 14 | 7 | .667 | 35 | 22 | .614 |
| San Francisco | 9 | 12 | .429 | 27 | 28 | .491 |
| Santa Clara | 9 | 12 | .429 | 27 | 29 | .482 |
| Loyola Marymount | 9 | 12 | .429 | 22 | 33 | .400 |
| Portland | 7 | 14 | .333 | 21 | 30 | .412 |
| Saint Mary's | 3 | 18 | .143 | 21 | 29 | .420 |

Division I Independents
| Team | W | L | Pct |
| Longwood | 34 | 19 | .642 |
| South Dakota State | 34 | 19 | .642 |
| Savannah State | 31 | 23 | .574 |
| Dallas Baptist | 30 | 26 | .536 |
| NYIT | 25 | 27 | .481 |
| Utah Valley | 25 | 30 | .833 |
| UC Davis | 24 | 32 | .429 |
| NJIT | 15 | 28 | .349 |
| North Dakota State | 16 | 31 | .340 |
| Northern Colorado | 16 | 35 | .314 |
| Texas–Pan American | 17 | 39 | .304 |
| Hawaii–Hilo | 12 | 35 | .255 |
| IPFW | 9 | 37 | .196 |
| Chicago State | 4 | 53 | .070 |

Team won the conference tournament and the automatic bid to the NCAA tournament
Conference does not have conference tournament, so team won the autobid for finishing in first
Team received at-large bid to NCAA tournament

== College World Series ==
The 2007 season marked the sixty first NCAA baseball tournament, which culminated with the eight team College World Series. The College World Series was held in Omaha, Nebraska. The eight teams played a double-elimination format, with Oregon State claiming their first championship with a two games to none series win over North Carolina in the final.

=== Bracket ===
First round
Oregon State | 3
Cal State Fullerton | 2
5 | Arizona State | 5
UC Irvine | 4
Cal State Fullerton | 4
UC Irvine | 5^{13}
2 | Rice | 15
Louisville | 10
Mississippi State | 5
3 | North Carolina | 8
Louisville | 12
Mississippi State | 4

Second round
Oregon State | 12
5 | Arizona State | 6
5 | Arizona State | 7
UC Irvine | 8^{10}
2 | Rice | 14
3 | North Carolina | 4
3 | North Carolina | 3
Louisville | 1

Semifinals
Oregon State | 7 | —
UC Irvine | 1 | —
2 | Rice | 1 | 4
3 | North Carolina | 6 | 7

Finals
Oregon State | 11 | 9 | —
3 | North Carolina | 4 | 3 | —
