= Tyler Eppler =

American baseball player (born 1993)

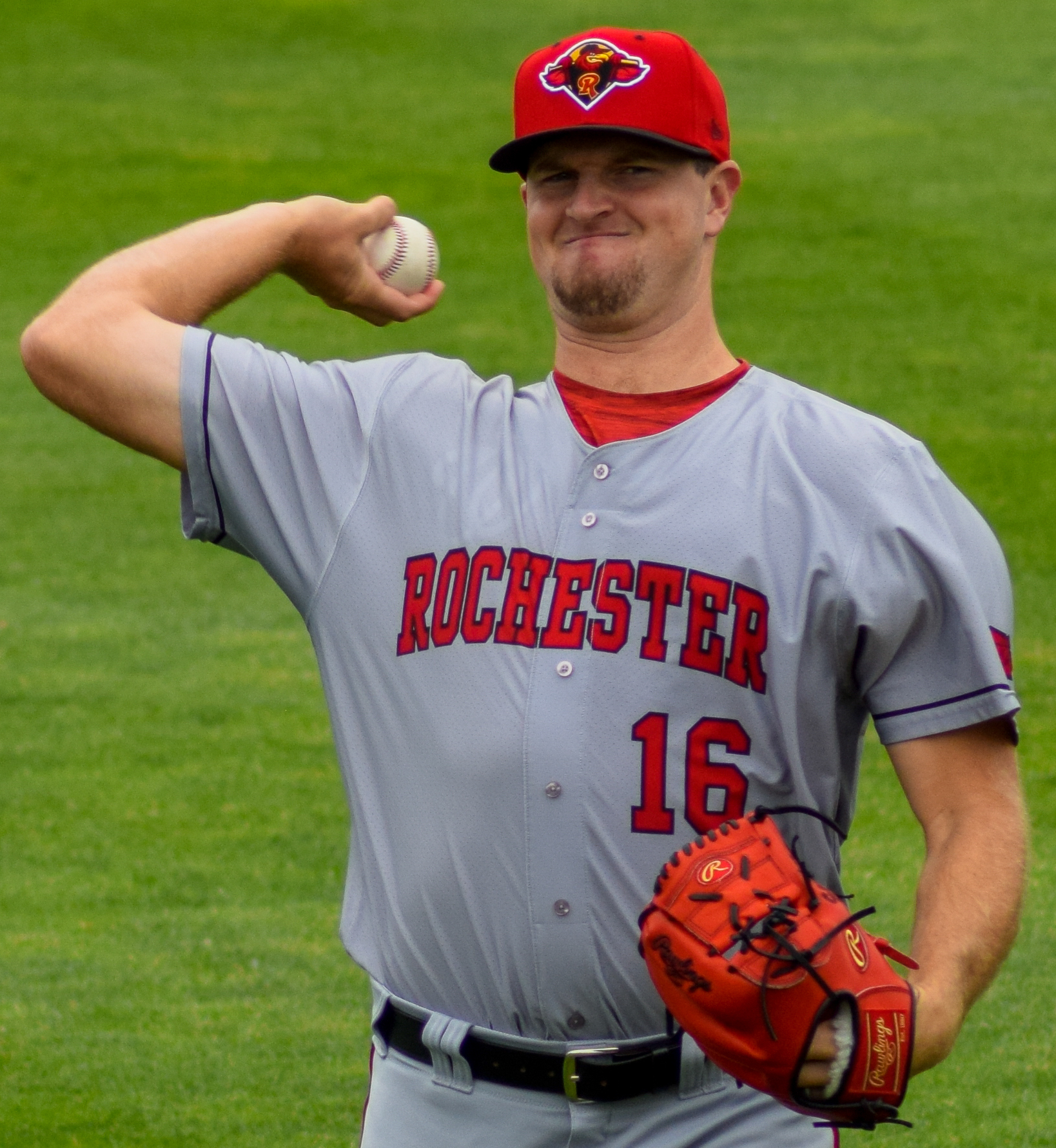
- Epler with the Rochester Red Wings in 2021

Rakuten Monkeys – No. 23
- Pitcher
- Born: January 5, 1993 (age 33); Navasota, Texas, U.S.
- Bats: Right Throws: Right

Professional debut
- NPB: May 4, 2019, for the Orix Buffaloes
- KBO: April 5, 2022, for the Kiwoom Heroes
- CPBL: April 3, 2023, for the Fubon Guardians

NPB statistics (through 2019 season)
- Win–loss record: 4–4
- Earned run average: 4.02
- Strikeouts: 25

KBO statistics (through 2022 season)
- Win–loss record: 6–8
- Earned run average: 4.30
- Strikeouts: 86

CPBL statistics (through May 17, 2026)
- Win–loss record: 19–17
- Earned run average: 2.94
- Strikeouts: 220
- Stats at Baseball Reference

Teams
- Orix Buffaloes (2019); Kiwoom Heroes (2022); Fubon Guardians (2023); Wei Chuan Dragons (2024–2025); Rakuten Monkeys (2026–present)

Tyler Austin Eppler (born January 5, 1993) is an American professional baseball pitcher for the Rakuten Monkeys of the Chinese Professional Baseball League (CPBL). He has previously played in Nippon Professional Baseball (NPB) for the Orix Buffaloes, the KBO League for the Kiwoom Heroes, and the CPBL for the Fubon Guardians and Wei Chuan Dragons.

== Career ==
=== Pittsburgh Pirates ===
Eppler attended Navasota High School in Navasota, Texas, and played college baseball at Texarkana College and Sam Houston State University. The Pittsburgh Pirates selected Eppler in the sixth round of the 2014 Major League Baseball draft. He signed with the Pirates on June 11, 2014, for a signing bonus worth $200,000.

Eppler made his professional debut with the Jamestown Jammers, pitching in 14 games, posting a 2.49 ERA. He played 2015 with the Bradenton Marauders and Altoona Curve, going 6–2 with a 3.14 ERA in 15 games. After the season he played in the Arizona Fall League. He spent 2016 with Altoona, pitching to a 9–1 record and 3.99 ERA in a career high 162.1 innings pitched. He spent 2017 with the Indianapolis Indians, posting an 8–9 record with a 4.89 ERA. Eppler returned to the Indians in 2018, going 13–6 with a 3.59 ERA in 28 games (25 starts).

=== Orix Buffaloes ===
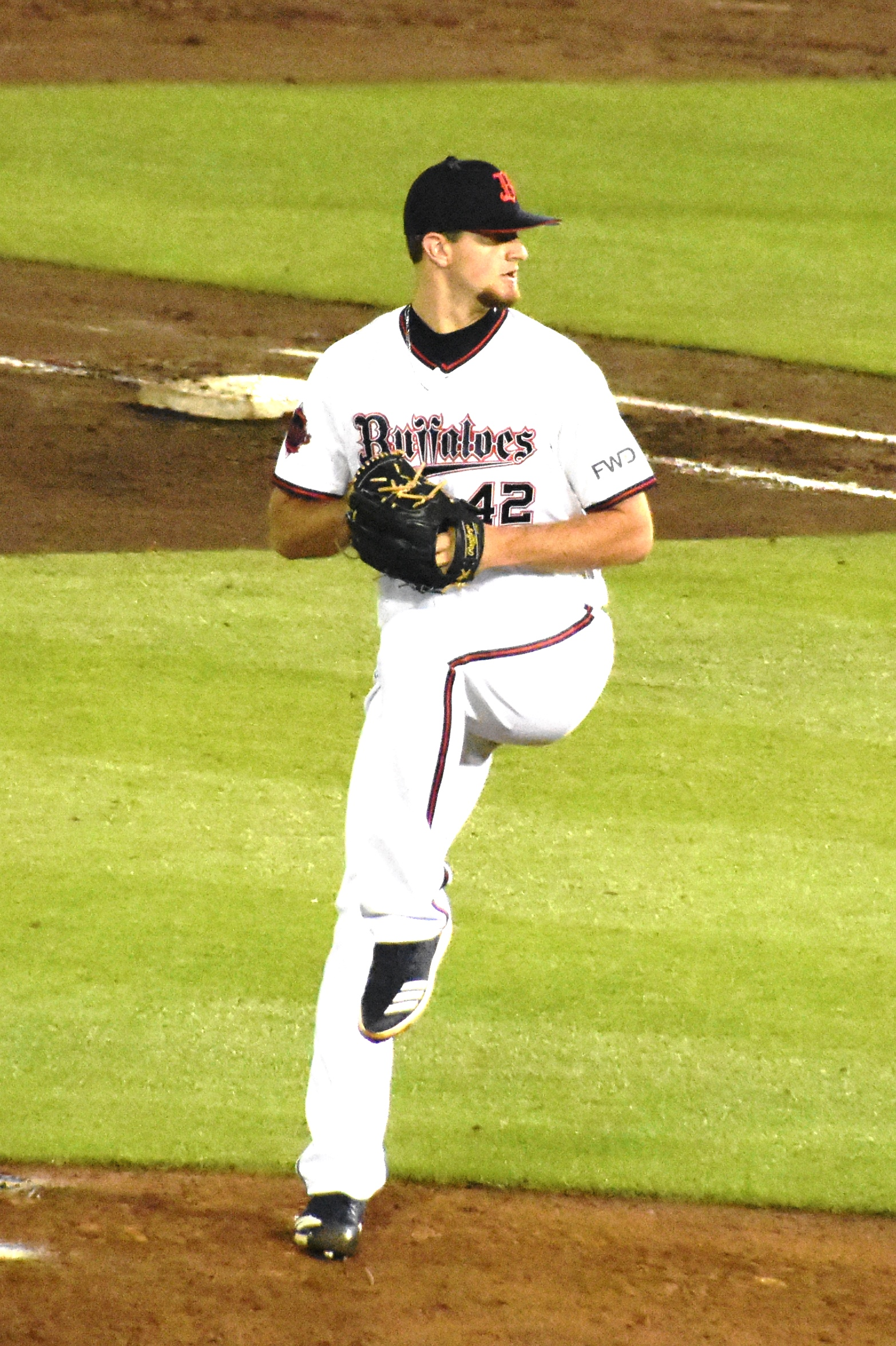
Eppler pitching for Orix in 2019.

On January 15, 2019, the Orix Buffaloes purchased Eppler's contract from the Pirates. In 24 games for Orix, he recorded a 4–4 record and 4.02 ERA with 25 strikeouts across 31 1/3 innings pitched. On December 2, Eppler became a free agent.

=== Washington Nationals ===
On January 9, 2020, Eppler signed a minor league deal with the Washington Nationals. Eppler did not play in a game in 2020 due to the cancellation of the minor league season because of the COVID-19 pandemic. In 2021, Eppler appeared in 19 games for the Triple-A Rochester Red Wings, posting a 7.75 ERA with 48 strikeouts. On August 24, 2021, Eppler was released by the Nationals.

=== Kiwoom Heroes ===
On December 17, 2021, Eppler signed a one-year, $400,000 deal with the Kiwoom Heroes of the KBO League. He became a free agent after the 2022 season.

=== Fubon Guardians ===
On January 5, 2023, Eppler signed with the Fubon Guardians of the Chinese Professional Baseball League. Eppler made 9 starts for Fubon, posting a 3–1 record and 2.89 ERA with 30 strikeouts in 56.0 innings pitched. On June 21, he was released by the Guardians. The release was made after Eppler decided to terminate the contract early for personal reasons.

=== Sultanes de Monterrey ===
On June 30, 2023, Eppler signed with the Sultanes de Monterrey of the Mexican League. In 7 starts for Monterrey, Eppler registered a 4–1 record and 4.23 ERA with 27 strikeouts across 38 1/3 innings pitched.

=== Wei Chuan Dragons ===
On February 6, 2024, Eppler signed with the Wei Chuan Dragons of the Chinese Professional Baseball League. He made 24 starts for Wei Chuan, compiling a 10-11 record and 2.75 ERA with 118 strikeouts across 150 2/3 innings pitched.

Eppler pitched in 21 games (including 18 starts) for the Dragons during the 2025 season, accumulating a 6-5 record and 3.21 ERA with 72 strikeouts over 115 innings of work.

=== Rakuten Monkeys ===
On February 5, 2026, Eppler signed with the Rakuten Monkeys of the Chinese Professional Baseball League.

== Personal life ==
Eppler's younger brother, Shelton, plays quarterback for the Osos de Monterrey of the Liga de Fútbol Americano Profesional.
