= Bear Stadium =

College baseball stadium in Arkansas, U.S.

- Interactive map of Bear Stadium
- Location: Bruce Street, Conway, Arkansas, United States
- Coordinates: 35°04′58.6″N 92°27′37.3″W
- Owner: University of Central Arkansas
- Operator: University of Central Arkansas
- Capacity: 1,000
- Surface: GeoGreen surface
- Scoreboard: Electronic
- Record attendance: 732 (April 3, 2009, against Texas State)

Construction
- Built: 2009 (rebuilt)
- Opened: February 20, 2009 (reopened)
- Renovated: 2011
- Cost: US$2 million (estimated)
- Architect: Wittenberg, Delony & Davidson
- General contractors: Ross Sparks Builders, Inc.

Tenant
- Central Arkansas Bears baseball

Bear Stadium is a baseball venue in Conway, Arkansas, United States. It is home to the Central Arkansas Bears college baseball team of the NCAA's Division I United Athletic Conference. Last rebuilt in 2009, the facility has a capacity of 1,000 spectators.

== History ==
=== Renovations ===
After the Bears' 2007 move to Division I, the UCA baseball facility was rebuilt to be appropriate to the new playing level. In the offseason between 2008 and 2009, the old facility was demolished and construction on the present one began.

The newly constructed ballpark, Bear Stadium, featured 106 chairbacks (part of a 1,000-spectator grandstand), press box, wheelchair elevator, concourse, and backstop. Following the 2010 season, a GeoGreen artificial turf surface was installed and the playing surface was raised.

=== Events ===
The stadium's first game was on February 20, 2009, when Central Arkansas defeated Tennessee-Martin 11–5. In 2010, Baseball Hall of Fame inductee Goose Gossage threw out the first pitch before a Bears game against Northwestern State. In 2011, the field hosted the Arkansas high school baseball championships.

== Attendance ==
The stadium's first game, held on February 20, 2009, attracted 517 spectators. A record 732 people attended the April 3, 2009, game against Texas State, the day of the stadium's official dedication.

=== Top 10 attendance marks ===
Below is a list of Bear Stadium's 10 best-attended games.

Rank	Date	Opponent	Attendance
1	April 3, 2009	Texas State	732
2	February 18, 2011	SIU Edwardsville	527
3	February 20, 2009	Tennessee-Martin	517
4	March 12, 2010	Stephen F. Austin	503
5	February 26, 2011	Eastern Illinois	484
6	February 20, 2011	SIU Edwardsville	475
7	February 19, 2011	SIU Edwardsville	447
8	February 20, 2007	Arkansas State	432
9	April 9, 2011	Texas State	427
10	April 8, 2011	Texas State	424

As of the 2011 season.

== See also ==
- List of NCAA Division I baseball venues
