= Southeastern Louisiana Lions baseball =

- 2026 Southeastern Louisiana Lions baseball team
- Founded: 1947; 79 years ago
- University: Southeastern Louisiana University
- Head coach: Bobby Barbier (3rd season)
- Conference: Southland
- Location: Hammond, Louisiana
- Home stadium: Pat Kenelly Diamond at Alumni Field (capacity: 2,500)
- Nickname: Lions
- Colors: Green and gold

College World Series appearances
- Division II: 1975

NCAA tournament appearances
- 1975, 1992, 1994, 2014, 2016, 2017, 2022

Conference tournament champions
- TAAC: 1992, 1994; Southland: 2014, 2022

Conference regular season champions
- Gulf States: *1953, *1955, *1957, *1962, *1963, *1965, *1966; Gulf South: *1978; Southland: 2015, 2025, 2026 *at Division II level

The Southeastern Louisiana Lions baseball team is a varsity intercollegiate athletic team of Southeastern Louisiana University in Hammond, Louisiana, United States. The team is a member of the Southland Conference, which is part of the National Collegiate Athletic Association's Division I. Southeastern Louisiana's first baseball team was fielded in 1947. The team plays its home games at Pat Kenelly Diamond at Alumni Field in Hammond, Louisiana. Since 2024, the Lions have been led by head coach Bobby Barbier.

== Southeastern Louisiana in the NCAA Tournament ==
Year	Record	Pct	Notes
1992	1–2	.333	West Regional
1994	0–2	.000	South Regional
2014	1–2	.333	Baton Rouge Regional
2016	1–2	.333	Baton Rouge Regional
2017	1–2	.333	Baton Rouge Regional
2022	0–2	.000	Auburn Regional
TOTALS	4–12	.250	

== Year-by-year results ==
Record table
Season	Coach	Overall	Conference	Standing	Postseason
Records unavailable (1947–1991)
Trans America Athletic Conference (1992–1997)
1992	Greg Marten	38–22	12–4	1st (West)	NCAA West Regional Playoff Participants
1993	Greg Marten	38–17	19–5	1st (West)	
1994	Greg Marten	34–30	15–9	1st-T (West)	1994 NCAA Division I baseball tournament
1995	Greg Marten	17–31	10–18	8th	
1996	Greg Marten	34–24	11–7	2nd (West)	
1997	Greg Marten	34–24	11–7	2nd (West)	
Trans America:		195–148	78–50		
Southland Conference (1998–present)
1998	Greg Marten	29–27	9–14	8th	
1999	Greg Marten	28–29	13–14	6th	
2000	Greg Marten	25–28	10–17	8th	
2001	Greg Marten	22–33	8–19	9th	
2002	Greg Marten	21–33	7–20	10th	
2003	Dan Canevari	18–35	8–18	9th	
2004	Dan Canevari	17–39	11–16	8th-T	
2005	Dan Canevari	29–31	13–14	6th-T	
2006	Jay Artigues	23–32	14–16	7th	
2007	Jay Artigues	34–21	16–14	3rd (East)	
2008	Jay Artigues	32–27	17–16	3rd (East)	
2009	Jay Artigues	37–22	21–12	2nd	
2010	Jay Artigues	40–19	21–12	3rd	
2011	Jay Artigues	35–22	18–14	4th	
2012	Jay Artigues	39–21	20–13	2nd	
2013	Jay Artigues	36–24	18–7	3rd	
2014	Matt Riser	37–23	18–12	5th	2014 NCAA Division I baseball tournament
2015	Matt Riser	41–15	25–5	1st	
2016	Matt Riser	40–21	22–8	2nd	2016 NCAA Division I baseball tournament
2017	Matt Riser	37–22	20–10	2nd	2017 NCAA Division I baseball tournament
2018	Matt Riser	37–22	21–9	2nd	
2019	Matt Riser	33–27	19–11	2nd	
2020	Matt Riser	6–10	1–2	11th	Season cut short due to COVID-19 pandemic
2021	Matt Riser	32–24	22–17	5th	
2022	Matt Riser	30–31	14–10	2nd	NCAA Regional
2023	Matt Riser	25-25	9–14		
Southland:		783–663	395–334		
Total:		978–811			
National champion Postseason invitational champion Conference regular season champion Conference regular season and conference tournament champion Division regular season champion Division regular season and conference tournament champion Conference tournament champion

== Major League Baseball ==
Southeastern Louisiana has had 50 players selected in the Major League Baseball draft since the draft began in 1965.

Lions in the Major League Baseball Draft
Year	Player	Round	Team
1965	Lamar LaBauve	23	Cubs
1966	Wayne Brescher	11	Senators
1971	Jerry Bowles	13	Reds
1974	Glen Lamas	8	Indians
1976	Andrew Davis	3	Orioles
1982	Andrew Lesnak	23	Twins
1984	Mark McMorris	3	Angels
1985	Mark McMorris	19	Cubs
1985	Sterling Housley	12	Blue Jays
1988	Shannon Jones	33	Cubs
1988	Rod Morris	25	Rangers
1988	Brock McMurray	11	Dodgers
1989	Colin Dixon	17	Red Sox
1990	Joseph Fleet	38	Indians
1990	Kevin Morgan	36	Cardinals
1991	Kevin Morgan	30	Tigers
1992	Kirk Bullinger	32	Cardinals
1992	Greg Elliott	9	Astros
1993	John Vindivich	20	Astros
1993	Carl Schutz	3	Braves
1994	Kevin Millican	13	Rangers
1995	Mike Kimbrell	25	Cardinals
1996	Mike Kimbrell	45	Devil Rays
1996	Thomas Ferrand	34	Phillies
1997	Jose Gonzales	14	Rockies
2000	Steve Sawyer	11	Marlins
2001	Steve Trosclair	36	Angels
2003	Barton Braun	37	Reds
2004	Anthony Garibaldi	37	Blue Jays
2005	Chad Pendarvis	29	Devil Rays
2005	Randy Roth	10	Cardinals
2006	Luis Suarez	40	Marlins
2007	Chris Province	4	Red Sox
2008	Wade Miley	1	Diamondbacks
2009	Ty Summerlin	30	Pirates
2010	Chris Franklin	12	Padres
2011	Brandon Efferson	37	Angels
2011	Justin Boudreaux	14	Dodgers
2012	Stefan Lopez	16	Yankees
2012	Brock Hebert	14	Mariners
2014	Andrew Godbold	23	Dodgers
2014	Andro Cutura	7	Twins
2015	Tate Scioneaux	39	Pirates
2015	Kyle Keller	18	Marlins
2015	Jake Johnson	16	Reds
2017	Mac Sceroler	5	Reds
2018	Drew Avans	33	Dodgers
2018	Josh Green	14	Diamondbacks
2018	Daniel Wasinger	31	Diamondbacks
2019	Cody Grosse	30	Mariners
2019	Bryce Tassin	31	Tigers
2021	Will Warren	8	New York Yankees
2021	Andrew Landry	16	New York Yankees

== See also ==
- List of NCAA Division I baseball programs
