= Incarnate Word Cardinals baseball =

Incarnate Word Cardinals
- 2026 Incarnate Word Cardinals baseball team
- Founded: 1987
- Overall record: 991–767–2
- University: University of the Incarnate Word
- Athletic director: Richard Duran
- Head coach: Nick Zaleski (1st season)
- Conference: Southland
- Location: San Antonio, Texas
- Home stadium: Sullivan Field (capacity: 1,000)
- Nickname: Cardinals
- Colors: Red, white, and black

Conference tournament champions
- Heart of Texas; 1997 Heartland; 2001, 2010

Conference regular season champions
- Heart of Texas; 1990, 1993, 1997 Heartland; 2005, 2006 Lone Star; 2011

For information on all University of the Incarnate Word sports, see Incarnate Word Cardinals

The Incarnate Word Cardinals baseball team represents The University of the Incarnate Word in NCAA Division I intercollegiate men's baseball competition. The Cardinals currently compete in the Southland Conference. The Cardinals play home games at Sullivan Field. The team is led by first-year head coach Nick Zaleski.

== History ==
Incarnate Word baseball has compiled an all-time record of 925–719–2 (.564 winning percentage) through the 2017 season. The Cardinals have won 6 regular season conference championships and 3 conference tournament championships. Incarnate Word has made 5 NCAA Postseason Regional Tournaments (1 NAIA Regional Tournament and 4 NCAA Division II South Central Regional Tournaments).

== All-time season results ==
Year-by-Year Results
Year	Head coach	Collegiate Record	Conference Record	Notes
1987	Jim Ellwanger	19–34		
1988	Jim Ellwanger	30–25	3–12	
1989	Jim Ellwanger	35–16	7–8	
1990	Jim Ellwanger	32–17	10–5	Heart of Texas Conference Champions
1991	Jim Ellwanger	35–18	8–7	
1992	Jim Ellwanger	31–18	8–7	
1993	Steve Heying	37–13–2	14–1	Heart of Texas Conference Champions
1994	Steve Heying	19–29	6–8	
1995	Steve Heying	28–21	15–6	
1996	Steve Heying	19–31	10–11	
1997	Steve Heying	36–22	15–9	Heart of Texas Conference Champions, Heart of Texas Conference Tournament Champions
1998	Danny Heep	33–17	14–7	
1999	Danny Heep	30–22	12–8	
2000	Danny Heep	20–28		
2001	Danny Heep	35–21		Heartland Conference Tournament Champions
2002	Danny Heep	31–24		
2003	Danny Heep	30–27		
2004	Danny Heep	41–17	14–6	
2005	Danny Heep	35–19	28–10	Heartland Conference Champions
2006	Danny Heep	38–21	30–10	Heartland Conference Champions
2007	Danny Heep	34–21	23–17	
2008	Danny Heep	39–17	35–14	
2009	Danny Heep	36–17	32–14	
2010	Danny Heep	42–18	34–13	Heartland Conference Tournament Champions
2011	Danny Heep	37–18	24–9	Lone Star Conference Champions
2012	Danny Heep	23–21	16–11	
2013	Danny Heep	26–26	12–16	
2014	Danny Heep	18–32	9–15	
2015	Danny Heep	21–33	11–19	
2016	Danny Heep	13–38	5–22	
2017	Danny Heep	20–36	8–22	
2018	Patrick Hallmark	29–26	13–17	
2019	Patrick Hallmark	37–22	18–12	
2020	Ryan Shotzberger	9–7	1–2	Season cut short by the COVID-19 pandemic
2021	Ryan Shotzberger	21–28	17–23	
2022	Ryan Shotzberger	21–31	9–15	

== Major League Baseball ==
Incarnate Word has had 8 Major League Baseball draft selections since the draft began in 1965.

Cardinals in the Major League Baseball Draft
Year	Player	Round	Team
1990	Eric Corbell	16	Mets
1992	Reynol Mendoza	7	Marlins
2002	Billy Dennis	49	Reds
2003	Matt Trepkowski	35	Reds
2005	Hector Delgadillo	36	Blue Jays
2008	Chris Solis	27	Nationals
2011	Elroy Urbina	37	Diamondbacks
2015	Geno Encina	18	Blue Jays

== See also ==
- List of NCAA Division I baseball programs
