= Central Arkansas Bears baseball =

- 2026 Central Arkansas Bears baseball team
- University: University of Central Arkansas
- Head coach: Nick Harlan (5th season)
- Conference: UAC
- Location: Conway, Arkansas
- Home stadium: Bear Stadium (capacity: 1,000)
- Nickname: Bears
- Colors: Purple and gray

NCAA tournament appearances
- 2013

Conference tournament champions
- Southland: 2013

The Central Arkansas Bears baseball team is a varsity intercollegiate athletic team of the University of Central Arkansas (UCA) in Conway, Arkansas. The team is a member of the United Athletic Conference, which is part of the National Collegiate Athletic Association's Division I, since the start of the 2022 season. The Bears, coached by Nick Harlan, play home games at Bear Stadium on the UCA campus.

== History ==
In 2013, UCA went farther into the playoffs than any Southland conference team has been, coming within one game of winning the Starkville regional. With the exception of eventual champion UCLA in the CWS Championship Series, the Bears were the only non-SEC team to beat Mississippi State in the 2013 season, splitting 3–3 with the Bulldogs on the year. After 11 seasons as the head coach of the Bears, Allen Gum announced his retirement at the conclusion of the 2021 season. Associate head coach, Nick Harlan, was named his successor.

== Central Arkansas in the NCAA Tournament ==
Year	Record	Pct	Notes
2013	3–2	.600	Starkville Regional
TOTALS	3–2	.600	

== Major League Baseball ==
Central Arkansas has had 23 Major League Baseball draft selections since the draft began in 1965.

Bears in the Major League Baseball Draft
Year	Player	Round	Team
1976	Steven Beene	1	Royals
1982	Wes Gardner	22	Mets
1984	Carl Rogers	16	Royals
1988	Jeff Hart	42	Padres
1992	Kevin Booker	11	Cubs
1992	Marquis Riley	2	Angels
1995	Phil Bailey	13	Giants
1996	Greg Montgomery	27	Cardinals
2006	Andy Jackson	26	Marlins
2008	Chris Davis	35	Diamondbacks
2011	Dustin Ward	19	Orioles
2013	Jeffrey Enloe	37	Padres
2013	Jonathan Davis	15	Blue Jays
2013	Forrestt Allday	8	Red Sox
2014	Doug Votolato	9	Rangers
2017	Ty Tice	16	Blue Jays
2017	Tyler Gray	20	Twins
2018	Tyler Gray	7	Royals
2018	Hunter Strong	25	Royals
2018	William Hancock	31	Royals
2019	Cody Davenport	20	Royals
2020	Gavin Stone	5	Dodgers
2021	Noah Cameron	7	Royals
2022	Tyler Cleveland	14	Mariners

== See also ==
- List of NCAA Division I baseball programs
