= LSU New Orleans Privateers baseball statistical leaders =

The LSU New Orleans Privateers baseball statistical leaders are individual statistical leaders of the LSU New Orleans Privateers baseball program in various categories, including batting average, home runs, runs batted in, runs, hits, stolen bases, ERA, and Strikeouts. Within those areas, the lists identify single-game, single-season, and career leaders. The Privateers represent LSU New Orleans in the NCAA's Southland Conference.

LSU New Orleans began competing in intercollegiate baseball in 1970. These lists are updated through the end of the 2025 season.

== Batting Average ==
Career (MINIMUM 250 AT-BATS)
Rk	Player	AVG	Seasons
1	Ted Wood	.380	1986 1987 1988
2	Brian DeValk	.375	1981 1982
3	Wayne Harer	.369	1972 1973
4	Joe Pietro	.367	2003 2004
5	Kevin McGann	.365	1977 1978 1979 1980
	Roy Hyer	.365	1970 1971 1972
7	John Ballon	.364	1999 2000
8	Johnny Giavotella	.363	2006 2007 2008
9	Scott Raziano	.362	1983 1984
	Leroy Weimer	.362	1976 1977 1978 1979

Season
Rk	Player	AVG	Season
1	Kevin McGann	.417	1980
2	Roy Hyer	.410	1972
3	Ted Wood	.409	1987
4	Kevin McGann	.407	1979
5	Scott Raziano	.406	1983
6	Brian DeValk	.400	1981
	Michael Epping	.400	2006
8	Mike Quade	.396	1979
9	Leroy Weimer	.394	1979
10	Bryce Calloway	.390	2025

== Home Runs ==
Career
Rk	Player	HR	Seasons
1	Brian Traxler	49	1986 1987 1988
2	Nick Schwaner	41	2007 2008 2009 2010
3	Scott Schwaner	37	1982 1983 1984 1985
4	Ted Wood	34	1986 1987 1988
5	Tristan Moore	33	2023 2025
6	Johnny Giavotella	32	2006 2007 2008
	Matt Matejcek	32	1999 2000
8	Augie Schmidt	30	1980 1981 1982
	Pearce Howard	30	2018 2019 2020 2021 2022
10	Stuart Weidie	28	1983 1984 1985 1986
	Issac Williams	28	2021 2022 2023 2024

Season
Rk	Player	HR	Season
1	Mark Higgins	24	1984
2	Brian Traxler	20	1987
3	Keith Schmitt	19	1987
	Tristan Moore	19	2023
5	Randy Bush	18	1979
	Matt Matejcek	18	2000
	Bryce Calloway	18	2025
8	Ted Wood	17	1987
	Jay Yaconetti	17	2004
	Nick Schwaner	17	2010

Single Game
Rk	Player	HR	Season	Opponent
1	Jay Yaconetti	3	2004	New Mexico St
	Tony Gonzalez	3	2004	Southern
	Kevin McGann	3	1978	South Alabama

== Runs Batted In ==
Career
Rk	Player	RBI	Seasons
1	Pearce Howard	211	2018 2019 2020 2021 2022
2	Brian Traxler	206	1986 1987 1988
3	Scott Schwaner	203	1982 1983 1984 1985
4	Kevin McGann	199	1977 1978 1979 1980
5	Leroy Weimer	182	1976 1977 1978 1979
6	Johnny Giavotella	172	2006 2007 2008
7	Stuart Weidie	170	1983 1984 1985 1986
8	T.J. Baxter	169	2005 2006 2007 2008
9	Nick Schwaner	165	2007 2008 2009 2010
10	Augie Schmidt	162	1980 1981 1982

Season
Rk	Player	RBI	Season
1	Mark Higgins	87	1984
2	Matt Matejcek	83	2000
3	Brian Traxler	78	1987
4	Randy Bush	77	1979
5	Josh Vander Hey	76	2008
	Brian DeValk	76	1982
7	Kevin McGann	75	1979
8	Scott Schwaner	74	1985
9	Brian Traxler	73	1988
10	Leroy Weimer	70	1979

Single Game
Rk	Player	RBI	Season	Opponent
1	Todd Wilson	9	1988	UTPA

== Runs ==
Career
Rk	Player	R	Seasons
1	Ted Wood	230	1986 1987 1988
2	T.J. Baxter	205	2005 2006 2007 2008
3	Johnny Giavotella	203	2006 2007 2008
	Stuart Weidie	203	1983 1984 1985 1986
5	David Ward	186	1984 1985 1986 1987
6	Augie Schmidt	184	1980 1981 1982
7	Scott Schwaner	181	1982 1983 1984 1985
8	Kasten Furr	178	2020 2021 2022 2023
9	Kevin McGann	172	1977 1978 1979 1980
10	Brandon Bowser	171	2005 2006 2007

Season
Rk	Player	R	Season
1	Ted Wood	91	1987
2	Gary Morals	89	1981
3	Ted Wood	83	1988
4	Joey Butler	77	2008
5	Johnny Giavotella	76	2008
6	Mark Higgins	75	1984
7	Scott Raziano	73	1984
	Augie Schmidt	73	1982
9	John Ballon	71	2000
10	Joe DiSalvo	70	1996

Single Game
Rk	Player	R	Season	Opponent
1	Hezekiah Randolph	5	2017	NW St.
	Nick Schwaner	5	2008	FIU
	Johnny Giavotella	5	2007	Southern
	Drew Pizza	5	2002	Miss Valley St.
	Mac Harer	5	1999	Missouri
	John Ballon	5	1999	Jackson St.
	Chris Powell	5	1995	Tulane
	Scott Krause	5	1994	UTPA
	Dean Culotta	5	1993	So. Alabama
	Brian Traxler	5	1988	Ga Tech
	Keith Schmitt	5	1987	Jackson St.
	Jimmy Bullinger	5	1985	Jackson St.
	Scott Schwaner	5	1985	Kent St.
	David Ward	5	1984	Nicholls St.
	Gary Morals	5	1981	Cornell (N.Y.)

== Hits ==
Career
Rk	Player	H	Seasons
1	Pearce Howard	289	2018 2019 2020 2021 2022
2	Kevin McGann	268	1977 1978 1979 1980
3	Anthony Leone	262	1990 1991 1992 1993
4	Johnny Giavotella	256	2006 2007 2008
5	Ted Wood	250	1986 1987 1988
6	Nick Schwaner	240	2007 2008 2009 2010
7	Leroy Weimer	237	1976 1977 1978 1979
8	Brian Traxler	232	1986 1987 1988
9	Brandon Bowser	231	2005 2006 2007
10	Stuart Weidie	228	1983 1984 1985 1986
	Scott Schwaner	228	1982 1983 1984 1985

Season
Rk	Player	H	Season
1	Ted Wood	104	1987
2	Kevin McGann	98	1979
3	Johnny Giavotella	95	2007
4	Mark Higgins	94	1984
5	Joey Butler	92	2008
6	Scott Raziano	91	1983
	Glenn Osinski	91	1990
8	Charlie White	90	1988
9	Scott Raziano	89	1984

Single Game
Rk	Player	H	Season	Opponent
1	Ted Wood	6	1986	La. Tech

== Stolen Bases ==
Career
Rk	Player	SB	Seasons
1	Darrell Nicholas	96	1991 1992 1993 1994
2	David Ward	88	1984 1985 1986 1987
3	Brandon Bowser	75	2005 2006 2007
4	Joe DiSalvo	68	1995 1996
5	Donnie Bollich	58	1999 2000 2001 2002
6	Kelly Smith	52	1990 1991
7	Johnny Giavotella	49	2006 2007 2008
	Ted Wood	49	1986 1987 1988
9	Mike Quade	43	1976 1977 1978 1979
10	T.J. Baxter	42	2005 2006 2007 2008
	Stuart Weidie	42	1983 1984 1985 1986

Season
Rk	Player	SB	Season
1	Joe DiSalvo	51	1996
2	Kelly Smith	44	1991
3	David Ward	42	1987
4	Donnie Bollich	31	2001
5	Howie Brodsky	28	1981
	Darrell Nicholas	28	1991
	Darrell Nicholas	28	1993
8	Charlie White	27	1988
9	Brandon Bowser	25	2007

Single Game
Rk	Player	SB	Season	Opponent
1	Joe DiSalvo	5	1996	Mississippi St.

== Earned Run Average ==
Career
Rk	Player	ERA	Seasons
1	Todd Pick	1.91	1989 1990
2	Gene Robinson	1.97	1976 1977
3	Mike Swingle	2.10	1976 1977
4	Mark Christy	2.47	1980 1981
5	Chris Schexnaydre	2.64	1994 1995
6	Stan Schroer	2.77	1971 1972 1973
7	Roger Erickson	2.84	1976 1977
8	Armand Sinibaldi	2.85	1982 1983
9	Dave Froelich	2.86	1978 1979
10	Joe Matranga	3.06	1976 1977 1978 1979 1980

Season (min. 55 IP)
Rk	Player	ERA	Season
1	Eric Rasmussen	0.90	1973
2	Gene Robinson	1.35	1977
3	Armand Sinibaldi	1.44	1982
4	Jim Weil	1.59	1976
5	Todd Pick	1.63	1990
6	Joe Housey	1.68	1980
7	Mike Swingle	1.89	1976
8	John Barr	2.04	2018
9	Stan Schroer	2.10	1972
10	Bryan Warzek	2.12	2017

== Strikeouts ==
Career
Rk	Player	K	Seasons
1	Bryan Cryer	340	2005 2006 2007 2008
2	Wally Whitehurst	310	1983 1984 1985
3	Brad Stuart	283	1988 1989 1990 1991
4	Thomas Diamond	278	2002 2003 2004
5	Bryan Warzek	260	2016 2017 2018
6	Joe Slusarski	246	1987 1988
7	Brandon Mitchell	242	2019 2020 2021 2022 2023
8	Brian Muller	240	1985 1986 1987 1989
9	Justin Garcia	224	2004 2005 2006 2007 2008
10	Paul Mancuso	221	1979 1980 1981 1982

Season
Rk	Player	K	Season
1	Joe Slusarski	146	1988
2	Thomas Diamond	138	2004
3	Wally Whitehurst	132	1985
4	Bryan Warzek	127	2018
5	Donald Rushing	126	1996
6	Wally Whitehurst	122	1984
7	Tom Lipari	113	2002
8	J.P. Martinez	110	2004
9	Shawn Semple	109	2017
10	Bryan Cryer	108	2006
	Brandon Kling	108	2002

Single Game
Rk	Player	K	Season	Opponent
1	Thomas Diamond	17	2004	Arkansas St
	Terry Kieffer	17	1974	Alabama State
3	Bryan Warzek	16	2018	Texas A&M-CC
	Sean Touchet	16	1992	South Ala.
	Wally Whitehurst	16	1985	Southern Miss
