= LSU New Orleans Privateers baseball =

Athletic team of LSU New Orleans

LSU New Orleans Privateers
- 2027 New Orleans Privateers baseball team
- Founded: 1970
- University: LSU New Orleans
- Head coach: Andrew Gipson (baseball) (1st season)
- Conference: Southland
- Location: New Orleans, Louisiana
- Home stadium: Maestri Field at Privateer Park
- Nickname: Privateers
- Colors: Privateers Purple, Privateers Gold, and Privateers Silver Gray

College World Series appearances
- 1974*, 1984 *at Division II level

NCAA regional champions
- 1984

NCAA tournament appearances
- 1977, 1979, 1980, 1981, 1982, 1984, 1985, 1987, 1988, 1989, 1996, 2000, 2007, 2008

Conference tournament champions
- American South 1989; Sun Belt: 1978, 1979, 2007

The LSU New Orleans Privateers baseball team is a varsity intercollegiate athletic team of LSU New Orleans in New Orleans, Louisiana, United States. The team is a member of the Southland Conference, which is part of the National Collegiate Athletic Association's Division I. The team plays its home games at Maestri Field at Privateer Park in New Orleans, Louisiana. The Privateers are led by head coach Andrew Gipson.

== History ==
=== Bob Hines, first coach (1970–1971) ===
Formed as early as 1970, LSU New Orleans started NCAA play in the Division II ranks. Bob Hines served as the first coach in LSUNO baseball history, directing the team to an 8–19 record in 1970 – its first season – followed by a 14–25 mark in 1971. The losing record in 1971 would be the last for the LSUNO program until Tom Schwaner's 1986 squad went 29–30. UNO defeated Southeastern Louisiana 7–6 on Mar. 13, 1970 in the first game in school history.

=== The Maestri years (1972–1985) ===
In 1972, Illinois native, Ron Maestri, was hired by then chancellor Homer Hitt as the second head coach to lead the Privateers. Following two consecutive winning seasons in the first two seasons with their new coach, the Privateers made school history in 1974 with a Division II College World Series berth. In Game 2, the Privateers recorded their first CWS win in a defeat of Valdosta State by a score of 13–9. They followed with a 6–2 win over Central Missouri State in game 6. After being bested by UC-Irvine, the Privateers bounced back to 2 consecutive wins over University of New Haven and previously unbeaten UC-Irvine. The comeback fell short, however, as the Privateers lost the final elimination game against UC-Irvine 14–1.

On July 1, 1975, the Privateers made the jump to Division I, hoping to build on their previous success. They joined the newly formed Sun Belt Conference in which they won the conference tournament in both 1978 and 1979 before becoming an NCAA Division I independent in 1980. After appearing in five NCAA Regionals in eight years, the Privateers finally made Louisiana sports history. In 1984, the LSU New Orleans was the first in-state school to appear in the Division I College World Series. In Game 1, the Privateers were defeated by the reigning CWS champions Texas by a score of 6–3. They bounced back to defeat and ultimately eliminate Big 10 representative Michigan. In Game 10 on June 6, however, the LSU New Orleans fell to Oklahoma State in 10 innings and was eliminated.

During Maestri's 14 seasons as head coach, the Privateers had a winning record each year, made seven appearances in the NCAA tournament, one College World Series appearance, and won at least forty games six times, while all other coaches in the school's history have had four such seasons. The program's overall record during his tenure was 517–245–1 (.678), as he is by far the winningest coach in school history.

=== Tom Schwaner era (1986–1999) ===
Following the success of Maestri, Tom Schwaner was hired as the third head coach for the Privateers. After seven years competing as Division I Independents, the Privateers would join 6 teams in the formation of the American South Conference. As members, the Privateers would win the regular season title in 1988, while winning the conference tournament in 1989. On July 1, 1991, the Privateers would join the Sun Belt Conference once again as the American South and Sun Belt Conference would merge.

After a few up and down years, the Privateers would once again find success in the 1996 season by earning a trip to the South II Regional in Baton Rouge as a 5 seed. In their first game, the Privateers would defeat Georgia Tech by a score of 13–3 and would follow with a victory over cross town rival Tulane by a score of 13–5. In their third game, they would face host team LSU and would ultimately lose before being eliminated by Georgia Tech in their fifth game.

=== Randy Bush (2000–2004) ===
Before the 2000 campaign, the university would hire former player and two time World Series champion, Randy Bush, as the fourth head coach of the Privateers. In his first season, the Privateers would record their first regular season title since 1988 and their first in the Sun Belt. Despite not winning the conference tournament, they would earn a 2 seed in the Baton Rouge Regional due to their success in the regular season. In their first game of the regional they would fall to Louisiana-Monroe. Facing elimination, the Privateers would defeat Jackson State before falling once again to Louisiana-Monroe.

=== Tom Walter and post-Katrina (2005–2009) ===
Tom Walter was chosen to be the fifth head coach for the Privateers. Despite the tremendous damage sustained to the East Campus of LSUNO, the Privateers were able to salvage a winning season and a trip to the Sun Belt Tournament. Building on their success, the Privateers were able to take the Sun Belt Conference tournament championship in 2007, a feat that had eluded them since 1979, and their first NCAA regional berth since 2000. In the NCAA regionals, the Privateers shocked host team Wichita State in the first game before losing to Arizona 9–8 and Wichita State to be eliminated.

The Privateers were able continue their success by making it to the SBC Championship Game before losing to the Hilltoppers of Western Kentucky. Despite not winning an automatic bid, their regular season efforts were enough to earn them a spot as a 3 seed in the Baton Rouge Regional. They would eventually lose to Southern Miss, defeat Texas Southern in game 3, and be eliminated by in game 5 by Southern Miss.

=== Bruce Peddie and NCAA division relocation talks (2010–2013) ===
With the exit of Tom Walter, and talks of a move to Division III or eliminating athletics all together, Assistant Coach Bruce Peddie was promoted to head coach. The Privateers compiled a 13–39 through the 2010 season in their final campaign in the Sun Belt before they officially left the conference on June 30, 2010. Despite being in division status limbo, the Privateers continued to play Division I opponents during the 2011 season as a Division I Independent and suffered another losing season.

The 2012 season marked the first season the baseball team would not be playing a full Division I schedule since 1975. Instead, the Privateers were accepted by the Gulf South Conference as a provisional member. As such, the Privateer baseball team played a largely Division II schedule with the exception of Nicholls State, McNeese, and Southern. On March 8, 2012, only 11 games into the 2012 season, Chancellor Peter Fos announced that the Privateers would not go through with their intention to compete as a Division II institution and would remain Division I.

With their Division I status reinstated, the Privateers competed in the 2013 season as Division I Independents and completed a 7–44 record. On May 31, 2013, it was reported that Bruce Peddie was relieved of his duties as head coach.

=== The return of Ron Maestri (2013–2015) ===
On July 2, 2013, LSUNO Athletic Director Derek Morel announced that former baseball coach and athletic director, Ron Maestri, would be returning as the head coach after a 28-year absence from coaching. On February 23, 2015, it was announced that Ron Washington was named volunteer assistant.

On May 19, 2015, Ron Maestri announced his retirement as head coach of the Privateers, effective July 1, 2015. Maestri finished with a 543–315–1 record with the Privateers over two stints as head coach. His Privateer teams appeared in the NCAA Division I baseball tournament nine times and in the College World Series two times.

=== Blake Dean (2016–2024) ===
After being named interim coach on May 21, 2015, Blake Dean was named the seventh head baseball coach of the Privateers for the 2016 season. The team nearly won as many games as they had won the previous three seasons (31 to 33) and more than doubled their win total (from 15 to 31) in Dean's first season earning a trip to the Southland Conference tournament marking their first postseason appearance since 2008, which was the last time UNO was invited to the NCAA tournament. In his second year as head coach, the team started 5–0, and ended up defeating in-state rival LSU twice in a season for the first time since 2008. The Privateers once again reached the Southland Tournament but were eliminated by eventual champion Sam Houston State. The program won thirty games in a season in back-to-back years for the first time since the 2007–2008 seasons, and Blake Dean became the only other coach in program history besides Ron Maestri to begin their tenures with back-to-back winning seasons. Dean's 90 wins in his first three seasons trails only Tom Schwaner and Randy Bush for the most wins by a head coach in his first three seasons in school history, and is more than the previous seven seasons combined (89) immediately preceding his arrival. Several weeks prior to the start of 2025 NCAA baseball season and after nine seasons in charge of the Privateers, Blake Dean stepped down as head coach to pursue a career in the private sector.

=== Dax Norris (2025) ===
On January 14, 2025, the University of New Orleans announced that Dax Norris would become the program's eighth head coach, following three years as the team's pitching coach under Blake Dean. In his first season, Norris led the Privateers to a 12–18 conference record, securing the No. 8 seed in the 2025 Southland Conference Tournament. The team advanced to the Southland Championship Series, where they faced the No. 6 seed, Houston Christian and were ultimately defeated in a best of three series. Norris would lead the Privateers to a 28-26 season in his first campaign as head coach.

On June 7, 2025, the University announced that Norris and the school had mutually agreed to part ways.

=== Andrew Gibson (2025-present) ===
On June 13, 2025, the University announced that former Belhaven University basbeball head coach Andrew Gipson would become the program's ninth head coach

== Head coaches ==
Records are through the end of the 2025 baseball season.

Tenure	Coach	Years	Record	Pct.
1970–1971	Bob Hines	2	22–44	.333
1972–1985	Ron Maestri	14	517–245–1	.678
1986–1999	Tom Schwaner	14	462–373	.553
2000–2004	Randy Bush	5	144–145	.498
2005–2009	Tom Walter	5	153–147	.510
2010–2013	Bruce Peddie	4	41–160	.204
2014–2015	Ron Maestri	2	26–78	.250
2016–2024	Blake Dean	9	225–194–1	.537
2025	Dax Norris	1	28-26	.519
2025-present	Andrew Gibson	1	0-0	0
Totals		56 seasons	1649–1440–2	.534

== Year-by-year results ==
Record table
Season	Coach	Overall	Conference	Standing	Postseason
Division II Independent (1970–1975)
1970	Bob Hines	8–19			
1971	Bob Hines	14–25			
1972	Ron Maestri	24–17			
1973	Ron Maestri	26–13			
1974	Ron Maestri	34–14			D–II College World Series Runner-Up
1975	Ron Maestri	23–20			
Sun Belt Conference (1976–1979)
1976	Ron Maestri	26–14–1			
1977	Ron Maestri	35–9			NCAA Regional
1978	Ron Maestri	35–16		1st	
1979	Ron Maestri	49–14		1st	NCAA Regional
Division I Independent (1980–1987)
1980	Ron Maestri	46–15			NCAA Regional
1981	Ron Maestri	48–16			NCAA Regional
1982	Ron Maestri	49–16			NCAA Regional
1983	Ron Maestri	34–29			
1984	Ron Maestri	45–24			College World Series
1985	Ron Maestri	43–28			NCAA Regional
1986	Tom Schwaner	29–30			
1987	Tom Schwaner	44–19			NCAA Regional
American South Conference (1988–1991)
1988	Tom Schwaner	42–23	14–1		NCAA Regional
1989	Tom Schwaner	33–34	10–5		NCAA Regional
1990	Tom Schwaner	37–27	11–4		
1991	Tom Schwaner	26–31	9–9		
Sun Belt Conference (1992–2010)
1992	Tom Schwaner	27–27	10–11		
1993	Tom Schwaner	25–28	9–10		
1994	Tom Schwaner	35–23	16–8		Sun Belt Tournament
1995	Tom Schwaner	36–22	15–11		Sun Belt Tournament
1996	Tom Schwaner	43–21	19–8		NCAA Regional
1997	Tom Schwaner	31–25	11–15		
1998	Tom Schwaner	29–29	13–13		Sun Belt Tournament
1999	Tom Schwaner	25–34	15–18		Sun Belt Tournament
2000	Randy Bush	38–25	20–9		NCAA Regional
2001	Randy Bush	25–32	13–14		Sun Belt Tournament
2002	Randy Bush	31–28	12–12	5th	Sun Belt Tournament
2003	Randy Bush	23–32	7–17	9th	
2004	Randy Bush	27–28	13–10	3rd	Sun Belt Tournament
2005	Tom Walter	20–39	10–14	7th	Sun Belt Tournament
2006	Tom Walter	30–28	12–12	T–4th	Sun Belt Tournament
2007	Tom Walter	38–26	16–14	T–2nd	NCAA Regional
2008	Tom Walter	43–21	18–11	2nd	NCAA Regional
2009	Tom Walter	22–33	12–18	T–9th	
2010	Bruce Peddie	13–39	2–26	11th	
Division I Independent (2011)
2011	Bruce Peddie	4–50			
Division II Independent (2012)
2012	Bruce Peddie	17–27			
Division I Independent (2013)
2013	Bruce Peddie	7–44			
Southland Conference (2014–Present)
2014	Ron Maestri	11–38	2–28	14th	
2015	Ron Maestri	15–40	3–27	13th	
2016	Blake Dean	31–26	14–16	T–7th	Southland tournament
2017	Blake Dean	30–28–1	16–14	T–7th	Southland tournament
2018	Blake Dean	29–32	14–16	T–7th	Southland tournament
2019	Blake Dean	29–27	13–17	T–9th	
2020	Blake Dean	11–6	2–1	T–2nd	(Note: Season suspended indefinitely on March 13, 2020 and ultimately canceled due to the COVID-19 pandemic)
2021	Blake Dean	29–28	23–17	3rd	Southland Tournament
2022	Blake Dean	30–23	13–11	3rd	Southland tournament
2023	Blake Dean	36–24	13–11	T–3rd	Southland tournament
2024	Blake Dean	31-26	14-10	3rd	Southland tournament
2025	Dax Norris	28-26	12-18	T-7th	Southland tournament
Total:		1649–1440–2			
National champion Postseason invitational champion Conference regular season champion Conference regular season and conference tournament champion Division regular season champion Division regular season and conference tournament champion Conference tournament champion

(Records as of May 24, 2025)

== NCAA tournament History ==
Year	Record	Pct	Notes
1977	1–2	.333	Eliminated by Baylor in the South Central Regional semifinals
1979	1–2	.333	Eliminated by Mississippi State in the South Regional semifinals
1980	1–2	.333	Eliminated by Western Kentucky in the South Regional semifinals
1981	1–2	.333	Eliminated by Michigan in the Mideast Regional semifinals
1982	2–2	.500	Eliminated by Wichita State in the South Regional Finals
1984	5–3	.625	Won the South II Regional; College World Series (5th place)
1985	1–2	.333	Eliminated by Michigan in the South I Regional semifinals
1987	2–2	.500	Eliminated by LSU in the South II Regional semifinals
1988	0–2	.000	Eliminated by Texas in the Central Regional Second Round
1989	3–2	.600	Eliminated by Texas in the Midwest Regional Finals
1996	2–2	.500	Eliminated by Georgia Tech in the South II Regional semifinals
2000	1–2	.333	Eliminated by Louisiana–Monroe in the Baton Rouge Regional Second Round
2007	1–2	.333	Eliminated by Wichita State in the Wichita Regional Second Round
2008	1–2	.333	Eliminated by Southern Miss in the Baton Rouge Regional Second Round
Total	22–29	.431	14 NCAA tournament Appearances; 1 College World Series Appearance

== Awards ==
- Golden Spikes Award – Augie Schmidt (1982)
- NCAA Division I All-American Selections – Augie Schmidt (1982), Ted Wood (1987)
- NCAA Division II All-American Selections – Eric Rasmussen (1973), Terry Kieffer (1974)
- NCAA College World Series All-Tournament Team – Scott Raziano (1984)
- Sun Belt Conference Freshman/Rookie of the Year – Steve Stanson (1995)
- Sun Belt Conference Pitcher of the Year – Thomas Diamond (2004), Bryan Cryer (2008)
- Sun Belt Coach of the Year – Ron Maestri (1979)

== Professional players ==
=== Privateers in the Majors ===
Athlete	Years active	Team(s)
Eric Rasmussen	1975–1983	St. Louis Cardinals (1975–1978, 1982–1983); San Diego Padres (1978–1980); Kansas City Royals (1983)
Roger Erickson	1978–1983	Minnesota Twins (1978–1982); New York Yankees (1982–1983)
Randy Bush	1982–1993	Minnesota Twins (1982–1993)
Wally Whitehurst	1989–1996	New York Mets (1989–1992); San Diego Padres (1993–1994); New York Yankees (1996)
Mark Higgins	1989	Cleveland Indians (1989)
Brian Traxler	1990	Los Angeles Dodgers (1990)
Ted Wood	1991–1993	San Francisco Giants (1991–1992); Montreal Expos (1993)
Joe Slusarski	1991–1993, 1995, 1999–2001	Oakland Athletics (1991–1993); Milwaukee Brewers (1995); Houston Astros (1999–2001); Atlanta Braves (2001)
Jim Bullinger	1992–1998	Chicago Cubs (1992–1996); Montreal Expos (1997); Seattle Mariners (1998)
Jason Waddell^	2009	Chicago Cubs (2009)
Thomas Diamond	2010	Chicago Cubs (2010)
Johnny Giavotella	2011–2017	Kansas City Royals (2011–2014); Los Angeles Angels of Anaheim / Los Angeles Angels (2015–2016); Baltimore Orioles (2017)
Joey Butler	2013–2015	Texas Rangers (2013); St. Louis Cardinals (2014); Tampa Bay Rays (2015)
Eric Orze	2024–Present	New York Mets (2024); Tampa Bay Rays (2025–Present)

^Jason Waddell played for the Privateers in 2000 before transferring to Riverside Community College

== Major League Baseball ==
LSU New Orleans has had 99 Major League Baseball draft selections, consisting of 92 players, since the draft began in 1965.

Privateers in the Major League Baseball Draft
Year	Player	Round	Team
1972	Joel Sexton	27	Pirates
1973	Stanley Schroer	26	Pirates
1973	Paul Joyce	28	Expos
1973	Eric Rasmussen	32	Cardinals
1974	Thomas Rima	15	Astros
1974	Terry Kieffer	1	Cardinals
1975	Gary Purcell	11	Red Sox
1975	Richard McCarthy	17	Orioles
1976	Randal Miller	1	Padres
1976	Brian Snitker	25	Cubs
1977	Roger Erickson	3	Twins
1977	Eugene Robinson	24	Twins
1977	Joseph Bennett	26	Twins
1979	Randy Bush	2	Twins
1979	David Froelich	14	Padres
1979	Manuel Colletti	15	Twins
1979	Mike Quade	22	Pirates
1979	Bill Lampey	27	Twins
1979	Paul Manieri	32	White Sox
1980	Kirby Krueger	7	Twins
1980	John Schaive	11	Pirates
1980	Kevin McGann	15	Mariners
1980	Joe Housey	2	Cubs
1981	Ronn Dixon	11	Mariners
1981	Howard Brodsky	22	Mariners
1981	Mark Christy	26	Padres
1982	Augie Schmidt	1	Blue Jays
1982	Jim Opie	2	Pirates
1982	Brian Devalk	7	Pirates
1982	Thomas Graziano	30	Pirates
1982	Paul Mancuso	31	Twins
1983	Scott Raziano	22	Yankees
1983	Dave Harman	24	Rangers
1983	Jim Cesario	34	Rangers
1984	Scott Raziano	6	Expos
1984	Steve Oswald	17	White Sox
1984	Mark Higgins	1	Indians
1985	Wally Whitehurst	3	Athletics
1985	Scott Ayers	2	Expos
1986	Jim Bullinger	9	Cubs
1986	Stuart Weidie	22	Red Sox
1987	Rob Mason	21	Expos
1987	David Lynch	22	Rangers
1987	Joe Slusarski	6	Mariners
1988	Ted Wood	1	Giants
1988	Joe Slusarski	2	Athletics
1988	Charlie White	3	Cardinals
1988	Brian Traxler	16	Dodgers
1988	Rouglas Odor	32	Indians
1988	Jeffrey Ingram	43	White Sox
1988	Nicholas Macaluso	49	Phillies
1988	Greg Perschke	23	Braves
1989	Greg Perschke	24	White Sox
1989	Phillip Wiese	25	Twins
1990	Todd Pick	14	Marlins
1990	Glenn Osinski	28	Athletics
1990	Dom DeSantis	28	Orioles
1990	Bradley Stuart	30	Yankees
1990	Sean Franceschi	34	Royals
1990	Bo Loftin	35	Reds
1991	Armando Morales	10	Reds
1991	Dom DeSantis	20	Phillies
1991	John Herrholz	29	White Sox
1991	Bradley Stuart	36	Rangers
1992	Aaron Lane	24	Orioles
1993	Doug Angeli	16	Phillies
1993	Darrell Nicholas	4	Cardinals
1994	Darrell Nicholas	4	Brewers
1994	Scott Krause	10	Brewers
1994	Christian Westcott	21	Red Sox
1994	Lenny Weber	23	Indians
1994	Jon Mathews	42	Rockies
1996	Joe DiSalvo	22	Astros
1996	Jason Washam	41	Brewers
1997	Jason Faust	36	Athletics
2000	Sammy Cooper	45	Cubs
2001	Jeff Miller	15	Pirates
2004	Thomas Diamond	1	Rangers
2004	J.P. Martinez	9	Twins
2004	Joe Pietro	9	Marlins
2006	Michael Epping	13	Padres
2007	Adam Campbell	16	Marlins
2007	Drew Anderson	22	Astros
2008	Johnny Giavotella	2	Royals
2008	Jeff Lanning	8	Twins
2008	Joey Butler	15	Rangers
2008	T.J. Baxter	24	Orioles
2008	Ryan O'Shea	27	Orioles
2008	Mark McGonigle	43	Mets
2009	Nick Schwaner	42	Giants
2009	John Pivach	46	Red Sox
2010	Nick Schwaner	30	Rays
2013	Stone Speer	25	Rays
2015	Kevin Kelleher	12	Red Sox
2017	Shawn Semple	17	Yankees
2018	Bryan Warzek	6	Dodgers
2019	Reeves Martin	21	Mariners
2020	Eric Orze	5	Mets
2024	Nathan Blasick	19	Rockies

== Trivia ==
- The Privateers have had 2 players compete on the U.S. Olympic Baseball Team. Joe Slusarski and Ted Wood were both members of the 1988 gold medal team in the Seoul, South Korea Olympics.
- As of the 2013 MLB draft, a total of 82 Privateers have been selected.
- The highest drafted Privateer was Augie Schmidt in 1982 as the 2nd overall pick to the Toronto Blue Jays.
- The Privateers have finished top 15 in attendance 8 times. The highest mark achieved was 85,884 spectators in 1987.
- Staff members at Maestri Field were awarded the Groundskeeper of the Year by the American Baseball Coaches Association in 1991.

== See also ==
- List of NCAA Division I baseball programs
