= Blake Dean (baseball) =

American baseball player and coach

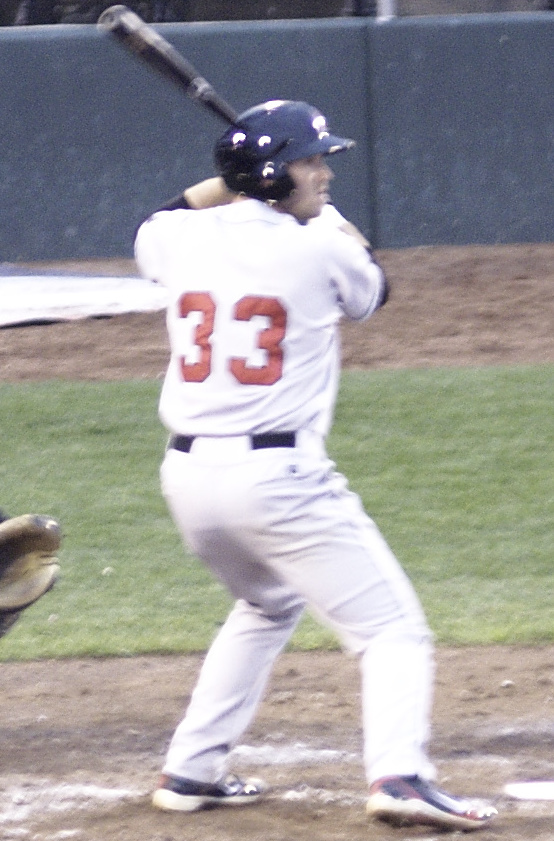
- Dean with the Great Lakes Loons in 2011

Biographical details
- Born: February 25, 1988 (age 38); Fort Walton Beach, Florida, U.S.

Playing career
- 2007–2010: LSU
- 2010: Ogden Raptors
- 2011: Great Lakes Loons
- Position: Baseman

Coaching career (HC unless noted)
- 2012–2015: New Orleans (AHC)
- 2016: New Orleans (Interim HC)
- 2016–2024: New Orleans

Head coaching record
- Overall: 256–220–1 (.538)
- Tournaments: SLC: 13–14

Accomplishments and honors

Awards
- Player: Baseball America First-Team All-American (2008); Baseball America Pre-Season Second-Team All-American (2009); Rivals.com First-Team All-American (2009)

Michael Blake Dean (born February 25, 1988) is a former professional baseball player who was recently the head coach of the New Orleans Privateers baseball program.

== Playing career ==
Dean played collegiately at Louisiana State University (LSU). He was one of LSU's leading hitters and was named MVP of the 2008 SEC baseball tournament. He has also received many other freshman awards, such as 2007 Collegiate Baseball Freshman All-American; 2007 Freshman All-SEC; 2007 Louisiana Freshman of the Year; SEC Freshman of the Week (May 7, 2007 and April 16, 2007).

Blake Dean tried out as a pitcher, coming out of high school. He was on the verge of getting cut, because he lacked velocity. He was quickly converted to a first baseman, after his coach saw him hit batting practice. He started all four years at first base and was one of the best power hitters in LSU baseball history. In 2007, he played collegiate summer baseball for the Wareham Gatemen of the Cape Cod Baseball League, and was selected to participate in the league's All-Star Home Run Derby.

In 2008 while helping lead his team to the 2008 College World Series, Dean was named a Baseball America First-Team All-American. In 2009 Dean was given another All-America selection as he was named to the pre-Season All-America team by Baseball America (2nd team) and Rivals.com (1st team). In 2010 Dean was a candidate for the Lowe's Senior Class Award.

He was drafted in the tenth round of the Major League Baseball Amateur Draft in the summer of 2009 by the Minnesota Twins, but did not sign. He then was drafted in the eighth round by the Los Angeles Dodgers in 2010. He spent two years in the Dodgers' farm system, one with the Ogden Raptors and one with the Great Lakes Loons.

== Coaching career ==
Dean became an assistant for the New Orleans Privateers baseball team after retiring from professional play.

After three seasons as an assistant, Dean was named the interim head coach heading into the 2016 season and, soon after, named permanent head coach.

On January 14, 2025, just a month before the 2025 season began, Dean announced his resignation from UNO to take a job outside of baseball, with pitching coach Dax Norris being named interim head coach.

== Statistics ==
Year	Age	Team	Conf	G	AB	R	H	2B	3B	HR	RBI	SB	CS	BB	SO	BA	OBP	SLG	OPS	TB	SH	SF	IBB	HBP	GDP
2007	19	LSU	SEC	56	206	30	65	12	3	7	46	1	1	20	25	.316	.366	.505	.871	104	0	8		1	2
2008	20	LSU	SEC	67	269	62	95	18	3	20	73	4	2	35	46	.353	.432	.665	1.097	179	0	2		4	5
2009	21	LSU	SEC	72	259	67	85	18	0	17	71	4	2	50	37	.328	.432	.595	1.027	154	0	10		5	7
Totals:				195	734	159	245	48	6	44	190	9	5	105	108	.332	.410	.588	.998	437	0	20		10	11

Roll over stat abbreviations for definitions. Stats through June 25, 2009.

== Head coaching record ==
Below is a table of Dean's yearly records as an NCAA head baseball coach.

Record table
Season	Team	Overall	Conference	Standing	Postseason
New Orleans Privateers (Southland Conference) (2016–2024)
2016	New Orleans	31–26	14–16	T–7th	Southland Tournament
2017	New Orleans	30–28–1	16–14	T–7th	Southland Tournament
2018	New Orleans	29–32	14–16	T–7th	Southland Tournament
2019	New Orleans	29–27	13–17	T–9th	
2020	New Orleans	11–6	2–1	T–2nd	Season canceled due to COVID-19
2021	New Orleans	29–28	23–17	2nd	Southland Tournament
2022	New Orleans	30–23	13–11	3rd	Southland Tournament
2023	New Orleans	36–24	13–11	T–3rd	Southland Tournament
2024	New Orleans	31–26	14–10	3rd	Southland Tournament
New Orleans:		256–220–1	122–113		
Total:		256–220–1			
National champion Postseason invitational champion Conference regular season champion Conference regular season and conference tournament champion Division regular season champion Division regular season and conference tournament champion Conference tournament champion
