= Ron Maestri =

American college baseball coach

Playing career
- 1960–1963: Bradley
- Position: 2B

Coaching career (HC unless noted)

Baseball
- 1969–1972: Bradley (Asst.)
- 1972–1984: New Orleans
- 2014–2015: New Orleans

Football
- 1968–1971: Bradley (Asst.)

Administrative career (AD unless noted)
- 1979–2000: New Orleans

Head coaching record
- Overall: 543–325–1

Ron Maestri is an American former college baseball coach. He was the head coach of the New Orleans Privateers baseball program. He previously held the same position from 1972–1984 and 2014–2015, also served as the Privateers athletic director from 1979–2000. In the interim, he held a series of positions in college athletics administration and worked in the front office of the minor league New Orleans Zephyrs before coming out of retirement to briefly fill UNO's coaching vacancy as it transitioned back to Division I.

== Head coaching record ==
The following table reflects Maestri's record as a head coach.

Record table
Season	Team	Overall	Conference	Standing	Postseason
New Orleans (Independent) (1972–1975)
1972	New Orleans	24–17			
1973	New Orleans	26–13			
1974	New Orleans	34–14			
1975	New Orleans	23–20			
New Orleans (Independent) (1976–1977)
1976	New Orleans	26–14–1			
1977	New Orleans	35–9			NCAA Regional
New Orleans (Sun Belt Conference) (1978–1980)
1978	New Orleans	35–16			Sun Belt tournament
1979	New Orleans	49–14			NCAA Regional
1980	New Orleans	46–15			NCAA Regional
New Orleans (Independent) (1981–1984)
1981	New Orleans	48–16			NCAA Regional
1982	New Orleans	34–29			NCAA Regional
1983	New Orleans	46–26			College World Series
1984	New Orleans	43–28			
First tenure:		518–247-1			
New Orleans (Southland Conference) (2014–2015)
2014	New Orleans	11–38	2-28	14th	
2015	New Orleans	14–40	3-27	13th	
Second tenure:		25–78	5-55		
Total:		543–325–1			
National champion Postseason invitational champion Conference regular season champion Conference regular season and conference tournament champion Division regular season champion Division regular season and conference tournament champion Conference tournament champion
