= 2018 New Orleans Privateers baseball team =

Baseball team

2018 New Orleans Privateers baseball
- Conference: Southland Conference
- Record: 29–32 (14–16 SLC)
- Head coach: Blake Dean (3rd season)
- Hitting coach: Brett Stewart (3rd season)
- Pitching coach: Rudy Darrow (2nd season)
- Home stadium: Maestri Field at Privateer Park

2018 Southland Conference baseball standings
	Conf.				Overall
Team	W		L	PCT	W		L	PCT
Sam Houston St ‍†‍‍	24	–	6	.800	39	–	20	.661
Southeastern Louisiana ‍‍‍	21	–	9	.700	37	–	22	.627
Northwestern State ‍‍‡‍^{y}	18	–	12	.600	37	–	22	.627
Houston Baptist ‍‍‍	18	–	12	.600	29	–	30	.492
Central Arkansas ‍‍‍	17	–	13	.567	32	–	25	.561
McNeese State ‍‍‍	15	–	15	.500	25	–	33	.431
Texas A&M–Corpus Christi ‍‍‍	14	–	16	.467	30	–	26	.536
New Orleans ‍‍‍	14	–	16	.467	29	–	32	.475
Nicholls State ‍‍‍	14	–	16	.467	28	–	32	.467
Incarnate Word ‍‍‍	13	–	17	.433	29	–	26	.527
Lamar ‍‍‍	13	–	17	.433	19	–	36	.345
Stephen F. Austin ‍‍‍	9	–	21	.300	17	–	36	.321
Abilene Christian ‍‍‍	5	–	25	.167	21	–	33	.389
† – Conference champion ‡ – Tournament champion y – Invited to the NCAA tournament Rankings from Collegiate Baseball

The 2018 New Orleans Privateers baseball team represented the University of New Orleans (UNO) during the 2018 NCAA Division I baseball season. The Privateers played their home games at Maestri Field at Privateer Park as a member of the Southland Conference. They were led by head coach Blake Dean, in his 3rd season at UNO.

== Personnel ==
=== Coaching staff ===
Name	Position	Seasons at UNO	Alma mater
Blake Dean	Head coach	3	Louisiana State University (2013)
Brett Stewart	Assistant coach	3	Appalachian State University (2009)
Rudy Darrow	Assistant coach	2	Nicholls State University (2012)
Dylan Belanger	Assistant coach/Camp Coordinator	3	University of Louisiana at Monroe

== Schedule ==
Legend
	UNO win
	UNO loss
**Bold**	UNO team member

2018 New Orleans Privateers Game Log
Regular season (26–30)

February (4–5)
Date	Opponent	Rank	Site/stadium	Score	Win	Loss	Save	Attendance	Overall record	SLC record
February 16	UIC		Maestri Field • New Orleans	5–4^{10}	**Oset**	Cerny		261	1–0	–
February 17	Alabama State		Wesley Barrow Stadium • New Orleans	3–6	Wright	**Barr**	Laney	308	1–1	–
February 18	Southern		Maestri Field • New Orleans	14–3	**Martinez**	Boyd		381	2–1	–
February 20	Jackson State		Maestri Field • New Orleans	2–4	Perez	**Orze**	Tirado	127	2–2	–
February 21	No. 15 LSU		Alex Box Stadium • Baton Rouge, LA	6–14	Hilliard	**Griffin**		10,154	2–3	–
February 23	Ball State		Maestri Field • New Orleans	10–1	**Warzek**	Baker		332	3–3	–
February 24	Virginia Tech		Maestri Field • New Orleans	4–2	**Arjona**	Hall	**Orze**	342	4–3	–
February 25	Iowa		Maestri Field • New Orleans	2–8	McDonald	**Smith**		252	4–4	–
February 27	No. 25 Southern Miss		Maestri Field • New Orleans	7–9	Wright	**Stephens**	Wallner	372	4–5	–

March (9–10)
Date	Opponent	Rank	Site/stadium	Score	Win	Loss	Save	Attendance	Overall record	SLC record
March 2	Arkansas State		Maestri Field • New Orleans	2–1^{11}	**Barr**	Kutzke		220	5–5	–
March 3	Arkansas State		Maestri Field • New Orleans	3–12	Lee	**Arjona**	Ritter	225	5–6	–
March 4	Arkansas State		Maestri Field • New Orleans	3–6	Culbertson	**Martin**	Kutzke	213	5–7	–
March 6	Tulane		Maestri Field • New Orleans	8–7	**Oset**	Bjorngjeld		463	6–7	–
March 9	Southeastern LA		Pat Kenelly Diamond • Hammond, LA	6–7	Lee	**Barr**		1,310	6–8	0–1
March 10	Southeastern LA DH-1		Pat Kenelly Diamond • Hammond, LA	1–3	Koestler	**Martin**	Shaffer	1,313	6–9	0–2
March 10	Southeastern LA DH-2		Pat Kenelly Diamond • Hammond, LA	8–1	**Stephens**	Granier		1,314	7–9	1–2
March 13	Southern		Maestri Field • New Orleans	6–2	**Schindler**	Franklin		331	8–9	–
March 16	Abilene Christian		Crutcher Scott Field • Abilene, TX	6–7	Knowles	**Oset**		50	8–10	1–3
March 17	Abilene Christian		Crutcher Scott Field • Abilene, TX	5–6	Barger	**Martin**	Scott	500	8–11	1–4
March 18	Abilene Christian		Crutcher Scott Field • Abilene, TX	14–10	**Arjona**	Brasher		500	9–11	2–4
March 20	No. 9 Ole Miss		Swayze Field • Oxford, MS	4–9	Roth	**Schindler**		9,996	9–12	–
March 23	Central Arkansas		Maestri Field • New Orleans	2–4^{10}	Rogers	**Griffin**	Moyer	232	9–13	2–5
March 24	Central Arkansas		Maestri Field • New Orleans	7–16	Brand	**Stephens**		243	9–14	2–6
March 25	Central Arkansas		Maestri Field • New Orleans	3–5	Davenport	**Arjona**		204	9–15	2–7
March 27	South Alabama		Eddie Stanky Field • Mobile, AL	8–2	**Stephens**	Booker		1,341	10–15	–
March 29	A&M–Corpus Christi		Chapman Field • Corpus Christi, TX	13–8	**Gillis**	Lacaze		539	11–15	3–7
March 30	A&M–Corpus Christi		Chapman Field • Corpus Christi, TX	2–0	**Warzek**	Hernandez	**Martin**	424	12–15	4–7
March 31	A&M–Corpus Christi		Chapman Field • Corpus Christi, TX	6–5^{11}	**Schindler**	Ayala	**Martin**	367	13–15	5–7

April (6–12)
Date	Opponent	Rank	Site/stadium	Score	Win	Loss	Save	Attendance	Overall record	SLC record
April 3	Tulane		Turchin Stadium • New Orleans	3–2	**Barr**	Bjorngjeld	**Martin**	1,924	14–15	–
April 6	Lamar		Vincent–Beck Stadium • Beaumont, TX	1–5	Driskill	**Warzek**		251	14–16	5–8
April 8	Lamar DH-1		Vincent–Beck Stadium • Beaumont, TX	6–2	**Smith**	Dallas		275	15–16	6–8
April 8	Lamar DH-2		Vincent–Beck Stadium • Beaumont, TX	2–0^{12}	**Barr**	Campbell	**Martin**	316	16–16	7–8
April 10	Tulane		Turchin Stadium • New Orleans	3–4	White	**Schindler**		1,707	16–17	–
April 11	Southern		Lee–Hines Field • Baton Rouge, LA	7–5	**Barr**	Robinson	**Martin**	121	17–17	–
April 13	McNeese State		Maestri Field • New Orleans	2–3	Rider	**Warzek**	Anderson	252	17–18	7–9
April 15	McNeese State DH-1		Maestri Field • New Orleans	6–9	King	**Stephens**	Rider	N/A	17–19	7–10
April 15	McNeese State DH-2		Maestri Field • New Orleans	7–9	Ueckert	**Smith**	Anderson	275	17–20	7–11
April 17	Jackson State		Braddy Field • Jackson, MS	4–7	Galatas	**Arjona**	Tirado	132	17–21	–
April 18	South Alabama		Maestri Field • New Orleans	9–15	Greene	**DeMayo**		176	17–22	–
April 20	No. 21 Texas		UFCU Disch–Falk Field • Austin, TX	6–8	Sawyer	**Barr**	McGuire	4,953	17–23	–
April 21	No. 21 Texas		UFCU Disch–Falk Field • Austin, TX	1–3	Shugart	**Smith**	Elder	5,203	17–24	–
April 22	No. 21 Texas		UFCU Disch–Falk Field • Austin, TX	4–1	**Stephens**	Henley	**Martin**	5,300	18–24	–
April 25	Louisiana–Lafayette		M. L. Tigue Moore Field • Lafayette, LA	6–8	Moore	**Oset**		4,633	18–25	–
April 27	Incarnate Word		Maestri Field • New Orleans	6–5^{11}	**Martin**	Allen		243	19–25	8–11
April 28	Incarnate Word		Maestri Field • New Orleans	3–4^{10}	Martinez	**Martin**		213	19–26	8–12
April 29	Incarnate Word		Maestri Field • New Orleans	2–8	Jackson	**Stephens**	Martinez	196	19–27	8–13

May (7–3)
Date	Opponent	Rank	Site/stadium	Score	Win	Loss	Save	Attendance	Overall record	SLC record
May 4	Houston Baptist DH-1		Husky Field • Houston, TX	8–1	**Smith**	Carter		N/A	20–27	9–13
May 4	Houston Baptist DH-2		Husky Field • Houston, TX	2–5	McCollough	**Arjona**		583	20–28	9–14
May 5	Houston Baptist		Husky Field • Houston, TX	2–1	**Warzek**	Batten	**Martin**	315	21–28	10–14
May 11	Nicholls State		Maestri Field • New Orleans	8–3	**Barr**	Hatcher		711	22–28	11–14
May 12	Nicholls State		Maestri Field • New Orleans	2–0	**Martin**	Ernestine		734	23–28	12–14
May 13	Nicholls State		Ray E. Didier Field • Thibodaux, LA	12–5	**Arjona**	Bahlinger		255	24–28	13–14
May 15	No. 13 Southern Miss		Pete Taylor Park • Hattiesburg, MS	14–9	**DeMayo**	Jackson		3,485	25–28	–
May 17	Northwestern State		Maestri Field • New Orleans	3–6	Heisler	**Smith**	Hlad	217	25–29	13–15
May 19	Northwestern State DH-1		Maestri Field • New Orleans	8–1	**Warzek**	Jones		N/A	26–29	14–15
May 19	Northwestern State DH-2		Maestri Field • New Orleans	4–10	Maddox	**Arjona**		291	26–30	14–16

Postseason (3–2)

SLC Tournament (3–2)
Date	Opponent	Rank	Site/stadium	Score	Win	Loss	Save	Attendance	Overall record	SLCT record
May 23	vs. (1) Sam Houston St	(8)	Constellation Field • Sugar Land, TX	4–3^{10}	**Barr**	Chisolm	**Martin**	N/A	27–30	1–0
May 24	vs. (4) Houston Baptist	(8)	Constellation Field • Sugar Land, TX	3–1	**Warzek**	Carter	**Martin**	N/A	28–30	2–0
May 25	vs. (4) Houston Baptist	(8)	Constellation Field • Sugar Land, TX	3–4^{12}	Newton	**DeMayo**		N/A	28–31	2–1
May 26	vs. (4) Houston Baptist	(8)	Constellation Field • Sugar Land, TX	6–1	**Arjona**	Copeland		N/A	29–31	3–1
May 26	vs. (3) Northwestern State	(8)	Constellation Field • Sugar Land, TX	5–7	Vasquez	**Griffin**		N/A	29–32	3–2

All rankings from Collegiate Baseball.
