= Brian Traxler =

American baseball player (1967–2004)

- First baseman / Pinch hitter
- Born: September 26, 1967; Waukegan, Illinois, US
- Died: November 19, 2004 (aged 37); San Antonio, Texas, US
- Batted: Left Threw: Left

Professional debut
- MLB: April 24, 1990, for the Los Angeles Dodgers
- NPB: April 9, 1994, for the Fukuoka Daiei Hawks
- CPBL: July 18, 1998, for the Chinatrust Whales

Last appearance
- MLB: May 21, 1990, for the Los Angeles Dodgers
- NPB: October 8, 1994, for the Fukuoka Daiei Hawks
- CPBL: October 27, 1998, for the Chinatrust Whales

MLB statistics
- Batting average: .091
- At bats: 11
- Hits: 1
- Games played: 9

NPB statistics
- Batting average: .263
- At bats: 499
- Hits: 131
- Games played: 129

CPBL statistics
- Batting average: .287
- At bats: 129
- Hits: 37
- Games played: 43
- Stats at Baseball Reference

Teams
- Los Angeles Dodgers (1990); Fukuoka Daiei Hawks (1994); Chinatrust Whales (1998)

Brian Lee Traxler (September 26, 1967 – November 19, 2004) was a first baseman in Major League Baseball (MLB) who played for the Los Angeles Dodgers during their 1990 season. Listed at 5 feet 10 inches (1.78 m) and 200 pounds (91 kg), Traxler batted and threw left-handed. Throughout his career, he was one of the most popular players on his baseball teams.

Born in Waukegan, Illinois, Traxler began playing baseball while just a toddler. After an All-State career at Waukegan East High School, he attended the University of New Orleans, where he set a school record with 49 home runs in a three-year career. Drafted by the Dodgers in the 16th round of the 1988 MLB draft, he was called up to join the team in 1990. Playing in nine games for Los Angeles, he had one hit, a double against Dennis Martínez.

Most of Traxler's time in the Dodger system was spent with the Triple-A Albuquerque Dukes, with whom Traxler played from 1989 through 1993. He batted over .300 with the team in 1992 and ranked among the Pacific Coast League leaders in several categories in 1993, but he was not called up to the major leagues, as fellow first base prospect Eric Karros had won the Rookie of the Year Award in 1992. Blocked by Karros, Traxler headed to Japan in 1994, playing one season for the Fukuoka Daiei Hawks, where he was the only foreign All-Star for the season. He returned to Albuquerque for one final season in 1995.

From 1996 through 2000, Traxler played independent baseball for several teams, as well as a half season with the Ho-Hsin Whales of the Chinese Professional Baseball League in 1998. Retiring after the 2000 season, he served as a hitting instructor from 2001 through 2004 for minor league teams in the Dodgers' system, though his contract was not renewed after the 2004 season. Traxler expected to look for another coaching job at the upcoming Winter Meetings, but he died of alcohol-related liver disease on November 19 at the age of 37.

== Early life ==
Brian Lee Traxler was born in Waukegan, Illinois, on September 26, 1967 to parents Floyd (nicknamed "Sandy") and Ruth. His father was employed for over 20 years as the chief operator of the North Shore Sanitary District. Brian was the oldest of three siblings, with sisters Kelly and Stacey born two and four years later, respectively.

Both Traxler's parents were athletic, and they purchased Brian his first baseball glove when he was eight months old. His father started playing baseball with him while he was a toddler, and by the age of four, he was demonstrating "keen hand-eye coordination," according to Traxler biographer Rory Costello. He started playing tee-ball at the age of five, usually demonstrating the ability of someone a year or more older. When he turned 10, he started playing sandlot ball from eight o'clock in the morning to six o'clock in the evening in the summer months, a practice he continued for six years.

Traxler was an all-state outfielder for Waukegan East High School. He also played basketball and golf for the high school, but not football, because his parents were worried about him getting hurt. Additionally, Traxler played American Legion Baseball for Homer Dahringer Post 281. A left-hander, he was mainly used as a first baseman, though he also was used as a pitcher and left fielder. Though one Major League Baseball (MLB) team offered Traxler a contract when he graduated from Waukegan East in 1985, his parents wanted him to attend college, in order for him to have a backup plan in case an injury derailed his baseball career. Northwestern University offered him a scholarship, but he attended the University of New Orleans (UNO), wanting to play baseball in a warmer area.

== College ==
At UNO, Traxler exhibited a deep understanding of the game of baseball. Tom Schwaner, the head baseball coach for the Privateers, used Traxler as his unofficial hitting coach. Though first base remained his position, he played every position except second base and shortstop with the Privateers. "He didn’t have the stuff [for pitching]," Schwaner recalled, "but he had the moxie." In one game, he threw a shutout against Wichita State University, a highly-ranked team at the time.

Traxler had a stellar career with the Privateers. He was hit in the head by a pitch in a 1986 game, resulting in a concussion, but he still hit 15 home runs that year. Next season, he hit 20 as the Privateers reached the National Collegiate Athletic Association (NCAA) South Division II Regional Tournament. He was a candidate to play in the 1987 Pan American Games for Team USA, but shin splints kept him from participating. He finished his junior season in 1988 with 14 home runs as the Privateers advanced to the NCAA Central Regional, where they were eliminated by the University of Michigan Wolverines. In his three seasons with the Privateers, Traxler set school records for total bases (438), home runs (49), and runs batted in (RBI) (206).

== Early minor league career (1988-1990) ==
Traxler was selected by the Los Angeles Dodgers in the 16th round of the 1988 MLB draft. The 400th overall pick, he was a long shot to reach the major leagues, but his chances were aided when fellow first base prospect Eric Karros negotiated for a higher-paying contract. Because of the delay, Traxler was sent to the Single-A Vero Beach Dodgers of the Florida State League to begin his career while Karros was sent to the Rookie-level Great Falls Dodgers of the Pioneer League, even though Karros had been drafted 10 rounds higher. In 72 games with Vero Beach, Traxler batted .292 with 30 runs scored, 76 hits, two home runs, and 34 RBI.

In 1989, Traxler began the year with the Double-A San Antonio Missions of the Texas League. He batted .346 with 37 runs scored, 79 hits, nine home runs, and 44 RBI in 63 games. Midway through the season, he was promoted to the Triple-A Albuquerque Dukes of the Pacific Coast League (PCL). In 64 games with the Dukes, he batted .301 with 33 runs scored, 72 hits, three home runs, and 30 RBI. Following the minor league season, Traxler played winter baseball with the Leones del Caracas of the Venezuelan Professional Baseball League. Nicknamed "El Gordito" by the fans, a reference to his heavy build, he batted .301 with four home runs and 39 RBI in 57 games.

Entering the 1990 season, baseball analyst Bill James described Traxler as an "absolutely square prospect…can hit, and could have a big year at Albuquerque this year. I don’t know how good he’ll be at the major league level, but he’s fun to watch." The Dodgers were worried about the fact that he weighed over 200 pounds, and manager Tommy Lasorda advised him to get in better shape. Traxler responded by losing 20 pounds. He began the season with Albuquerque, as his first seven appearances were in a Dukes uniform.

== Los Angeles Dodgers (1990) ==
On April 22, 1990, Jeff Hamilton of the Dodgers was placed on the disabled list with a torn rotator cuff. With Kal Daniels temporarily unavailable due to a twisted side, the Dodgers desired another left-handed bat on the roster. They purchased Traxler's contract from Albuquerque and promoted him to the major leagues. He made his MLB debut on April 24, 1990, replacing Eddie Murray at first base after the veteran was ejected from the game by umpire Harry Wendelstedt. In his lone at bat of the contest, he struck out against Bob Tewksbury, but the Dodgers defeated the St. Louis Cardinals 3–0. Traxler got his first and only start in the major leagues at first base on May 8 against the Montreal Expos. He had no hits in two at bats before being pinch-hit for in the seventh inning by John Shelby as the Dodgers lost 9–1. Still batting .000 after his first six games, Traxler got his first career hit on May 10 with a pinch-hit double against Dennis Martínez in an 8–2 loss to the Expos. He would have had another double on May 13 against David Cone of the New York Mets, but the game was rained out, and the statistics from the game did not count. In his ninth game for the Dodgers, on May 21, he played first base for only the third time when he replaced Mickey Hatcher for the final two innings of a 12–3 loss to the Mets. Traxler's family hoped to see him play when the Dodgers travelled to Chicago to take on the Cubs at Wrigley Field on May 23, but the Dodgers sent Traxler back to Albuquerque the day before so that they could activate Pat Perry from the disabled list. In nine games with the Dodgers, he batted .091 with one hit and four strikeouts in 11 at bats.

== Albuquerque Dukes (1990-1993) ==
Traxler would remain at Albuquerque for the rest of the 1990 season. Bone spurs in his elbow limited him to 98 games with the Triple-A club. He batted .277 with 43 runs scored, 88 hits, seven home runs, and 53 RBI. Traxler had the bone spurs removed in 1991, but the Dodgers sent him back to San Antonio to recover. He spent most of the season with the Double-A team, batting .256 with 50 runs scored, 97 hits, seven home runs, and 61 RBI in 103 games. Traxler also played 18 games for Albuquerque, batting .357 with three runs scored, 10 hits, one home run, and eight RBI. During the 1990-91 offseason, Traxler had skipped playing winter ball because his first child was born. However, he followed up the 1991 season by playing for the Tigres del Licey of the Dominican Winter League. In 47 games, he batted .266 with three home runs and 16 RBI as the Tigres reached the playoffs.

During the 1992 season, Traxler played 127 games for Albuquerque. He batted .303 with 58 runs scored, 119 hits, 11 home runs, and 58 RBI. However, in the major leagues, Karros had taken over from Murray as the everyday first baseman and won the National League (NL) Rookie of the Year Award, diminishing Traxler's chances of returning to the major leagues with the Dodgers. After the season, Traxler returned to the Leones del Caracas, but he batted just .217 this time while only playing 27 games.

Traxler had continued to pitch occasionally, making one appearance on the mound in 1990 and 1992 for Albuquerque. In 1993, he pitched two games for the Dukes, winning one of them, though his earned run average (ERA) was 11.57. Traxler again played 127 games for Albuquerque in 1993, ranking among the PCL leaders in several categories. His .333 batting average was fourth in the league (behind Jim Lindeman's .362, teammate Jerry Brooks's .344, and Brian Johnson's .339), his 81 runs scored were ninth, his 147 hits were fifth, his 36 doubles were tied with Kurt Abbott and Luis López for third (behind James Mouton's 42 and Steve Hosey's 40), his 16 home runs were tied with four other players for eighth, and his 83 RBI were ninth in the league. Despite his strong season, he was not called up by Los Angeles in September. This time, he went to Puerto Rico for winter ball, playing with the Indios de Mayagüez. In 27 games, he batted .256 with three home runs and 16 RBI.

== Fukuoka Daiei Hawks (1994) ==
Entering the 1994 season, the Colorado Rockies were interested in acquiring Traxler, though they only planned to use him as a pinch hitter. Instead, Traxler cut his season in Puerto Rico short, signing with the Fukuoka Daiei Hawks of the Japanese Pacific League in Nippon Professional Baseball. In Fukuoka, he was used as the everyday first baseman. He had seven RBI in his first game with the team. After a strong first half, he became the only foreign player named to the Japanese All-Star Game. The fans nicknamed him "Koro Koro-chan" (a reference to his heavy build), and a custom solid ceramic figurine (not a bobblehead) the team created sold 6,000 units, prompting the team to make figurines of some other players.

Traxler did not hit quite as well in the second half of the season, finishing the year with a .263 average, 15 home runs, and 29 RBI in 129 games. He did not return to Fukuoka in 1995, as the Hawks replaced him with former NL Most Valuable Player (MVP) Kevin Mitchell at first base.

== Last season with the Dukes, independent baseball (1995-1997) ==
Traxler returned to the Dodgers organization in 1995, playing one final season for Albuquerque. In 110 games, he batted .283 with 46 runs scored, 100 hits, 11 home runs, and 50 RBI. As this was his sixth year in the minors for the Dodgers, he became a minor league free agent after the season. In his six seasons with the Dukes, Traxler set team records for most games played (544), doubles (122), and total bases (829) in a career. He was inducted into the Albuquerque Professional Baseball Hall of Fame in 2011.

In 1996, Traxler joined the independent-league Fargo-Moorhead RedHawks for their inaugural 1996 season. According to Fargo manager Doug Simunic, Traxler "kind of got us started as an organization. He was one of the first guys we signed and he showed a lot of guys how things were supposed to be done." That year, Traxler was one of the top hitters in the Northern League, batting .335 (fifth) with 110 hits (fifth), 16 doubles, and 16 home runs while driving in 75 runs (tied for fifth with Peter Kuld) and scoring 73 times (sixth) in 83 games. In 1997, he followed with a .298 average, 12 doubles, three home runs, 37 RBI, and 29 runs scored in 42 games. With the team not doing as well as it had the year before, the RedHawks decided to release Traxler on July 17, along with six other players. Team management felt that Traxler, who typically served as the cleanup hitter, was not getting enough clutch hits. Traxler said of the release, "I’m not bitter about it, just give me a reason. Give me a real reason." He finished the season with the Northern League's Sioux Falls Canaries, batting .313 with 16 runs scored, 42 hits, three home runs, and 21 RBI in 37 games. In 79 games combined between the two teams, he batted .304 with 45 runs scored, 95 hits, six home runs, and 58 RBI.

== Ho-Hsin Whales, last seasons (1998-2000) ==
Over the winter between the 1997 and 1998 seasons, Traxler drove a sugar beet truck to make money. He started the 1998 season with the Somerset Patriots of the newly formed, independent Atlantic League of Professional Baseball. Though primarily playing at first base, Traxler also was used as a designated hitter for the team, which played all its games on the road since its new stadium would not be finished until 1999. In 37 games, he batted .256 with 12 runs scored, 33 hits, five home runs, and 26 RBI.

Traxler's contract with Somerset included a clause that allowed him to opt out if he got offered a spot on a team at a higher level. He took advantage of this clause in early July, when he went to Taiwan to join the Ho-Hsin Whales of the Chinese Professional Baseball League. In 43 games, he batted .287 with 17 runs scored, 37 hits, two home runs, and 21 RBI.

In 1999, Traxler returned to Somerset. On June 19, he hit two home runs in an inning against the Bridgeport Bluefish at The Ballpark at Harbor Yard. For the season, he batted .250 with 34 runs scored, 97 hits, 12 home runs, and 61 RBI in 109 games. Though the scorecard still described him as 5'10" and 200 lbs, author Bob Golon described Traxler as weighing more than 250 lbs. Manager Sparky Lyle later said, "He was by far the best hitter we’ve ever had here."

Traxler returned to Sioux Falls in 2000, playing with the Canaries until the team released him on June 28. In 28 games, he batted .222 with 10 runs scored, 22 hits, three home runs, and 12 RBI.

== Final years ==
Following his playing days, he became a hitting instructor in the Dodgers minor league system. He served at Great Falls in 2001 and 2002, then helped the Vero Beach Dodgers in 2003. Though he remained in Vero Beach in 2004, it was for the rookie-level Gulf Coast League Dodgers. After the 2004 season, the Dodgers did not renew Traxler's contract. Traxler planned to look for another position at the upcoming Winter Meetings.

On November 4, 2004, Traxler was taken to North Central Baptist Hospital in San Antonio, Texas, with alcohol-related liver disease. He slipped into a coma before dying 15 days later at the age of 37. A memorial service was held for him on December 1, and his remains were cremated and scattered at V. J. Keefe Memorial Stadium and Privateer Park. Friend Josh Buchholz recalled that the Dodgers had Traxler in a treatment program at one time. "It was not much else besides beer, just years and years of lifestyle," Buchholz said. "Brian had his demons, and they crept in."

== Personal life ==
Traxler met his wife, Gabriela “Gabby” Aguayo, in 1989 while he was playing for the Missions. She was a souvenir seller at V. J. Keefe Memorial Stadium. They were married on February 3, 1990. A woman who "loved baseball" by her own admission, she would hit him ground balls and pitch batting practice for him during his offseason workouts. The couple had one daughter, Ashley. Over the winter in 1996–97, the couple separated for what Costello calls "family reasons." "His love was for the game,” Gabby explained. “Without the game, he wouldn't have been who he was. It's a very tough lifestyle; I admire families that can stay with it. But we made the decision together. We remained very good friends and I don't regret it.” They officially divorced in 1999. Towards the end of Brian's life, Gabby came to visit him several times while he was ill in the hospital. Ashley inherited her parents' love of sports, as she went on to play fastpitch softball.

Over the course of his career, Traxler was always a popular player with the fans. He never turned down autograph requests, waiting until lines were empty before he stopped signing. He was "gregarious and approachable, the type of player that fans of all stripes could relate to," according to the Home News Tribune. Off the field, he was a frequent partier who always enjoyed the nightlife. "I like to have a few beers once in a while and I eat what I want to eat," he described himself once, though baseball historian Frank Russo observed that he engaged in "heavy beer consumption".
