= 1988 Major League Baseball draft =

Baseball draft of amateur players by Major League Baseball

General information
- Date: June 1–3, 1988
- Location: New York City

Overview
- 1433 total selections
- First selection: Andy Benes; San Diego Padres
- First round selections: 30
- Hall of Famers: 1: C Mike Piazza

The 1988 Major League Baseball draft took place June 1–3, 1988, in New York City. The draft saw the San Diego Padres select Andy Benes first overall.

== First Round Selections ==
The following are the first round picks in the 1988 Major League Baseball draft.

= All-Star	= Baseball Hall of Famer

Pick	Player	Team	Position	Hometown/School
1	Andy Benes	San Diego Padres	RHP	Evansville
2	Mark Lewis	Cleveland Indians	SS	Hamilton High School (OH)
3	Steve Avery	Atlanta Braves	LHP	Kennedy High School (MI)
4	Gregg Olson	Baltimore Orioles	RHP	Auburn
5	Bill Bene	Los Angeles Dodgers	RHP	Cal State Los Angeles
6	Monty Fariss	Texas Rangers	SS	Oklahoma State
7	Willie Ansley	Houston Astros	OF	Plainview High School (TX)
8	Jim Abbott	California Angels	LHP	Michigan
9	Ty Griffin	Chicago Cubs	2B	Georgia Tech
10	Robin Ventura	Chicago White Sox	3B	Oklahoma State
11	Pat Combs	Philadelphia Phillies	LHP	Baylor
12	Tom Fischer	Boston Red Sox	LHP	Wisconsin
13	Austin Manahan	Pittsburgh Pirates	SS	Horizon High School (AZ)
14	Tino Martinez	Seattle Mariners	1B	Tampa
15	Royce Clayton	San Francisco Giants	SS	St. Bernard High School (CA)
16	Stan Royer	Oakland Athletics	C	Eastern Illinois
17	Charles Nagy	Cleveland Indians	RHP	UConn
18	Hugh Walker	Kansas City Royals	OF	Jacksonville High School (AR)
19	Dave Wainhouse	Montreal Expos	RHP	Washington State
20	Johnny Ard	Minnesota Twins	RHP	Manatee CC
21	Dave Proctor	New York Mets	RHP	Allen County CC
22	John Ericks	St. Louis Cardinals	RHP	Illinois
23	Brad DuVall	St. Louis Cardinals	RHP	Virginia Tech
24	Alex Fernandez	Milwaukee Brewers	RHP	Monsignor Edward Pace High School (FL)
25	Ed Sprague	Toronto Blue Jays	3B	Stanford
26	Rico Brogna	Detroit Tigers	1B	Watertown High School (CT)

== Supplemental first round selections ==
Pick	Player	Team	Position	Hometown/School
27	Jeff Mutis	Cleveland Indians	LHP	Lafayette
28	Ricky Gutiérrez	Baltimore Orioles	SS	American Senior High School (FL)
29	Ted Wood	San Francisco Giants	OF	New Orleans
30	Brian Jordan	St. Louis Cardinals	OF	Richmond

== Other notable players ==
- Arthur Rhodes†, 2nd round, 34th overall by the Baltimore Orioles
- Bob Hamelin, 2nd round, 48th overall by the Kansas City Royals
- Darren Oliver, 3rd round, 63rd overall by the Texas Rangers
- Scott Servais, 3rd round, 64th overall by the Houston Astros
- Marquis Grissom†, 3rd round, 76th overall by the Montreal Expos
- David Weathers, 3rd round, 82nd overall by the Toronto Blue Jays
- Luis Gonzalez†, 4th round, 90th overall by the Houston Astros
- Turk Wendell, 5th round, 112th overall by the Atlanta Braves
- Mickey Morandini†, 5th round, 120th overall by the Philadelphia Phillies
- John Valentin, 5th round, 121st overall by the Boston Red Sox
- Pat Listach, 5th round, 133rd overall by the Milwaukee Brewers
- Eric Karros, 6th round, 140th overall by the Los Angeles Dodgers
- Gary DiSarcina, 6th round, 143rd overall by the California Angels
- Rheal Cormier, 6th round, 158th overall by the St. Louis Cardinals
- Greg McMichael, 7th round, 163rd overall by the Cleveland Indians
- Jim Edmonds†, 7th round, 169th overall by the California Angels
- Mark Wohlers†, 8th round, 190th overall by the Atlanta Braves
- Tim Naehring, 8th round, 199th overall by the Boston Red Sox
- Tim Wakefield†, 8th round, 200th overall by the Pittsburgh Pirates
- Mark Clark, 9th round, 236th overall by the St. Louis Cardinals
- Pete Rose Jr., 12th round, 295th overall by the Baltimore Orioles
- Scott Hatteberg, 12th round, 302nd overall by the Philadelphia Phillies, but did not sign
- Paul Byrd†, 13th round, 332nd overall by the Cincinnati Reds, but did not sign
- Kenny Lofton†, 17th round, 428th overall by the Houston Astros
- Darren Lewis, 18th round, 463rd overall by the Oakland Athletics
- John Flaherty, 25th round, 641st overall by the Boston Red Sox
- Joey Hamilton, 28th round, 711th overall by the Baltimore Orioles, but did not sign
- Scott Taylor, 28th round, 719th overall by the Boston Red Sox
- Woody Williams†, 28th round, 732nd overall by the Toronto Blue Jays
- Russ Davis, 29th round, 755th overall by the New York Yankees
- Jeff Frye, 30th round, 765th overall by the Texas Rangers
- Damion Easley†, 30th round, 767th overall by the California Angels
- Deion Sanders, 30th round, 781st overall by the New York Yankees
- Mike Matheny, 31st round, 810th overall by the Toronto Blue Jays, but did not sign
- Aaron Sele†, 37th round, 961st overall by the Minnesota Twins, but did not sign
- Marvin Benard, 39th round, 1003rd overall by the Chicago White Sox, but did not sign
- Orlando Palmeiro, 43rd round, 1114th overall by the New York Yankees, but did not sign
- Scott Erickson†, 44th round, 1140th overall by the Toronto Blue Jays, but did not sign
- Fernando Viña†, 51st round, 1266th overall by the New York Yankees, but did not sign
- Mike Piazza‡, 62nd round, 1390th overall by the Los Angeles Dodgers

† All-Star
‡ Hall of Famer

=== NFL players drafted ===
- Rodney Peete, 14th round, 359th overall by the Oakland Athletics, but did not sign
- Todd Marinovich, 43rd round, 1101st overall by the California Angels, but did not sign
- Hart Lee Dykes, 54th round, 1300th overall by the Chicago White Sox, but did not sign

== See also ==
- List of first overall Major League Baseball draft picks

Preceded by Ken Griffey Jr.	1st Overall Picks; Andy Benes	Succeeded by Ben McDonald
