= 2018 Lamar Cardinals baseball team =

American college baseball season

2018 Lamar Cardinals baseball
- Conference: Southland Conference
- Record: 19–36 (13–17 SLC)
- Head coach: Will Davis (2nd season)
- Assistant coaches: Scott Hatten; Jon Phillips
- Home stadium: Vincent–Beck Stadium

2018 Southland Conference baseball standings
| | Conf. | | | | Overall |
| Team | W | | L | PCT | W | | L | PCT |
|---|---|---|---|---|---|---|---|---|
| Sam Houston St ‍†‍‍ | 24 | – | 6 | .800 | 39 | – | 20 | .661 |
| Southeastern Louisiana ‍‍‍ | 21 | – | 9 | .700 | 37 | – | 22 | .627 |
| Northwestern State ‍‍‡‍^{y} | 18 | – | 12 | .600 | 37 | – | 22 | .627 |
| Houston Baptist ‍‍‍ | 18 | – | 12 | .600 | 29 | – | 30 | .492 |
| Central Arkansas ‍‍‍ | 17 | – | 13 | .567 | 32 | – | 25 | .561 |
| McNeese State ‍‍‍ | 15 | – | 15 | .500 | 25 | – | 33 | .431 |
| Texas A&M–Corpus Christi ‍‍‍ | 14 | – | 16 | .467 | 30 | – | 26 | .536 |
| New Orleans ‍‍‍ | 14 | – | 16 | .467 | 29 | – | 32 | .475 |
| Nicholls State ‍‍‍ | 14 | – | 16 | .467 | 28 | – | 32 | .467 |
| Incarnate Word ‍‍‍ | 13 | – | 17 | .433 | 29 | – | 26 | .527 |
| Lamar ‍‍‍ | 13 | – | 17 | .433 | 19 | – | 36 | .345 |
| Stephen F. Austin ‍‍‍ | 9 | – | 21 | .300 | 17 | – | 36 | .321 |
| Abilene Christian ‍‍‍ | 5 | – | 25 | .167 | 21 | – | 33 | .389 |
† – Conference champion ‡ – Tournament champion y – Invited to the NCAA tournament Rankings from Collegiate Baseball

The 2018 Lamar Cardinals baseball team represented Lamar University during the 2018 NCAA Division I baseball season as members of the Southland Conference. The Cardinals played their home games at Vincent–Beck Stadium and were led by second–year head coach Will Davis. The team compiled a 19–36 overall record and were 13–17 in conference play tied for tenth place. They failed to qualify for the SLC tournament.

== Schedule and results ==
Legend
| | Lamar win |
| | Lamar loss |
| | Postponement/Cancelation/Suspensions |
| **Bold** | Lamar team member |
| * | Non-Conference game |
| † | Make-Up Game |

2018 Lamar Cardinals baseball game log
Regular season (19–36)

February (3–7)
| Date | Opponent | Rank | Site/stadium | Score | Win | Loss | Save | Attendance | Overall record | SLC Record |
Cardinal Classic
| Feb. 16 | Missouri State* | 22 | Vincent–Beck Stadium • Beaumont, TX | 2–11 | Coleman, Dylan (1–0) | **Campbell, Jace (0–1)** | None | 753 | 0–1 | |
| Feb. 17 | Missouri State* | 22 | Vincent–Beck Stadium • Beaumont, TX | 8–0 | **Sills, Noah (1–0)** | Buckner, Ty (0–1) | **Driskill, Tanner (1)** | 601 | 1–1 | |
| Feb. 18 | Texas Southern* | | Vincent–Beck Stadium • Beaumont, TX | 3–4 | Aaron SOLIS (1–0) | **Wright, Grason (0–1)** | Seth OLIVER (1) | 837 | 1–2 | |
| Feb. 21 | at Texas* | 14 | UFCU Disch–Falk Field • Austin, TX | 2–7 | Elder (1–0) | **Jones, Chet (0–1** | None | 3,950 | 1–3 | |
| Feb. 23 | Hofstra* | | Vincent–Beck Stadium • Beaumont, TX | 2–1 | **Storrie, Kristjan (1–0)** | Weiss, Chris (0–1) | **Driskill, Tanner (2)** | 275 | 2–3 | |
| Feb. 23 | Hofstra* | | Vincent–Beck Stadium • Beaumont, TX | 3–0 | **Sills, Noah (2–0)** | Weissheier, Matt (0–1) | **Erickson, Ryan (1)** | 467 | 3–3 | |
| Feb. 24 | Hofstra* | | Vincent–Beck Stadium • Beaumont, TX | 2–3 | Weiss, Chris (1–0) | **Driskill, Tanner (0–1)** | None | 367 | 3–4 | |
| Feb. 24 | Hofstra* | | Vincent–Beck Stadium • Beaumont, TX | 0–1 | Brazill, Seamus (1–0) | **Dallas, Jack (0–1)** | None | 5877 | 3–5 | |
| Feb. 27 | at Tulane* | | Greer Field at Turchin Stadium • New Orleans, LA | 1–7 | BATES, Josh (1–0) | **Blanchard, Jason (0–1)** | None | 1,515 | 3–6 | |
| Feb. 28 | at Tulane* | | Greer Field at Turchin Stadium • New Orleans, LA | 2–6 | SOLESKY, Chase (1–0) | **Rich, Taylor (0–1)** | None | 1,465 | 3–7 | |

March (3–15)
| Date | Opponent | Rank | Site/stadium | Score | Win | Loss | Save | Attendance | Overall record | SLC Record |
|---|---|---|---|---|---|---|---|---|---|---|
| Mar. 2 | UT Rio Grande Valley* | | Vincent–Beck Stadium • Beaumont, TX | 2–5 | Johnson, Carter (1–1) | **Campbell, Jace (0–2)** | Jackson, Ryan (3) | 456 | 3–8 | |
| Mar. 3 | UT Rio Grande Valley* | | Vincent–Beck Stadium • Beaumont, TX | 5–8 | Hill, Trevelle (2–1) | **Driskill, Tanner (0–2)** | None | | 3–9 | |
| Mar. 4 | UT Rio Grande Valley* | | Vincent–Beck Stadium • Beaumont, TX | 5–3 | **Dallas, Jack (1–1)** | Adams, Chase (2–1) | **Storrie, Kristjan (1)** | 547 | 4–9 | |
| Mar. 7 | Rice* | | Vincent–Beck Stadium • Beaumont, TX | 2–6 | Roel Garcia (1–0) | **Hiebert, AbeRee (0–1)** | None | 827 | 4–10 | |
| Mar. 9 | Sam Houston State | | Vincent–Beck Stadium • Beaumont, TX | 1–3 | Backhus, Kyle (2–0) | **Olivarez, Marcus (0–1)** | Mikolajchak, Nick (2) | 956 | 4–11 | 0–1 |
| Mar. 10 | Sam Houston State | | Vincent–Beck Stadium • Beaumont, TX | 2–5 | Gossett, Riley (2–0) | **Sills, Noah (2–1)** | Mills, Dakota (1) | 456 | 4–12 | 0–2 |
| Mar. 11 | Sam Houston State | | Vincent–Beck Stadium • Beaumont, TX | 1–8 | Sequeira, Gabriel (2–0) | **Blanchard, Jason (0–2)** | None | 305 | 4–13 | 0–3 |
| Mar. 16 | Southeastern Louisiana | | Vincent–Beck Stadium • Beaumont, TX | 4–6 | Green, Josh (3–1) | **Campbell, Jace (0–3)** | Tassin, Bryce (3) | 247 | 4–14 | 0–4 |
| Mar. 17 | Southeastern Louisiana | | Vincent–Beck Stadium • Beaumont, TX | 1–8 | Koestler, Carlisle (4–0) | **Sills, Noah (2–2)** | None | 245 | 4–15 | 0–5 |
| Mar. 18 | Southeastern Louisiana | | Vincent–Beck Stadium • Beaumont, TX | 3–5 | Biddy, Jared (1–0) | **Blanchard, Jason (0–3)** | Warren, Will (2) | 384 | 4–16 | 0–6 |
| Mar. 20 | Houston* | | Schroeder Park • Houston, TX | 1–3 | PULIDO (2–1) | **Storrie, Kristjan (1–1)** | HENRY (1) | 1,360 | 4–17 | |
| Mar. 23 | at Incarnate Word | | Sullivan Field • San Antonio, TX | 9–3 | **Driskill, Tanner (1–2)** | Miller, T. (2–2) | None | 287 | 5–17 | 1–6 |
| Mar. 24 | at Incarnate Word | | Sullivan Field • San Antonio, TX | 3–8 | Taggart, Luke (3–1) | **Sills, Noah (2–3)** | None | 902 | 5–18 | 1–7 |
| Mar. 25 | at Incarnate Word | | Sullivan Field • San Antonio, TX | 2–12 (8 inn) | Martinez, Bernie (3–2) | **Blanchard, Jason (0–4)** | None | 844 | 5–19 | 1–8 |
| Mar. 27 | Northwestern State* | | Vincent–Beck Stadium • Beaumont, TX | 2–7 | Maddox, Jerry (2–2) | **Campbell, Jace (0–4)** | Hodo, David (1) | 427 | 5–20 | |
| Mar. 29 | at Houston Baptist | | Husky Field • Houston, TX | 4–7 | Carter, Zach (1–3) | **Driskill, Tanner (1–3)** | None | 305 | 5–21 | 1–9 |
| Mar. 30 | at Houston Baptist | | Husky Field • Houston, TX | 2–5 | McCollough, Matthew (3–1) | **Sills, Noah (2–4)** | None | 390 | 5–22 | 1–10 |
| Mar. 31 | at Houston Baptist | | Husky Field • Houston, TX | 6–4 | **Rich, Taylor (1–1)** | Newton, JT (1–4) | None | 427 | 6–22 | 2–10 |

April (9–8)
| Date | Opponent | Rank | Site/stadium | Score | Win | Loss | Save | Attendance | Overall record | SLC Record |
|---|---|---|---|---|---|---|---|---|---|---|
| Apr. 3 | at Baylor* | | Baylor Ballpark • Waco, TX | 1–2 | Hill, K. (3–1) | **Campbell, Jace (0–5)** | Montemayor (7) | 1,703 | 6–23 | |
| Apr. 6 | New Orleans | | Vincent–Beck Stadium • Beaumont, TX | 5–1 | **Driskill, Tanner (2–3)** | Warzek, Bryan (2–1) | None | 251 | 7–23 | 3–10 |
| Apr. 8 | New Orleans | | Vincent–Beck Stadium • Beaumont, TX | 2–6 | Smith, Brayson (1–1) | **Dallas, Jack (1–2)** | None | 275 | 7–24 | 3–11 |
| Apr. 8 | New Orleans | | Vincent–Beck Stadium • Beaumont, TX | 0–2 | Barr, John (3–2) | **Campbell, Jace (0–6)** | Martin, Reeves (4) | 316 | 7–25 | 3–12 |
| Apr. 10 | Northwestern State* | | Vincent–Beck Stadium • Beaumont, TX | 3–15 | Pigott, Tyler (1–0) | **Jones, Chet (0–2)** | None | 364 | 7–26 | |
| Apr. 13 | at Texas A&M–Corpus Christi | | Chapman Field • Corpus Christi, TX | 12–2 | **Driskill, Tanner (3–3)** | Aaron Hernandez (1–5) | None | 424 | 8–26 | 4–12 |
| Apr. 14 | at Texas A&M–Corpus Christi | | Chapman Field • Corpus Christi, TX | 11–6 | **Erickson, Ryan (1–0)** | Leonel Perez (4–3) | None | 299 | 9–26 | 5–12 |
| Apr. 15 | at Texas A&M–Corpus Christi | | Chapman Field • Corpus Christi, TX | 9–7 | **Dallas, Jack (2–2)** | Cole Carter (4–2) | **Jones, Chet (1)** | 343 | 10–26 | 6–12 |
| Apr. 17 | at Northwestern State* | | H. Alvin Brown–C. C. Stroud Field • Natchitoches, LA | 3–2 | **Campbell, Jace (1–6)** | Hlad, Danny (3–2) | **Rich, Taylor (1)** | 402 | 11–26 | |
| Apr. 20 | Abilene Christian | | Vincent–Beck Stadium • Beaumont, TX | 7–5 | **Driskill, Tanner (4–3)** | Barger, Brock (2–5) | **Erickson, Ryan (2)** | 457 | 12–26 | 7–12 |
| Apr. 21 | Abilene Christian | | Vincent–Beck Stadium • Beaumont, TX | 5–0 | **Sills, Noah (3–4)** | Nicholson, Jonathan (2–5) | **Erickson, Ryan (3)** | 645 | 13–26 | 8–12 |
| Apr. 22 | Abilene Christian | | Vincent–Beck Stadium • Beaumont, TX | 4–5 | Lewis, Brennan (3–0) | Dallas, Jack (2–3) | None | 456 | 13–27 | 8–13 |
| Apr. 24 | at LSU* | | Alex Box Stadium, Skip Bertman Field • Baton Rouge, LA | 0–8 | Labas (5–1) | **Campbell, Jace (1–7)** | None | 10,027 | 13–28 | |
| Apr. 25 | at Southern University* | | Lee–Hines Field • Baton Rouge, LA | 14–12 (10 inn) | **Dallas, Jack (3–3)** | T. Robinson (1–5) | None | 178 | 14–28 | |
| Apr. 27 | at Nicholls | | Ben Meyer Diamond at Ray E. Didier Field • Thibodaux, LA | 16–9 | **Driskill, Tanner (5–3)** | Ernestine, Alex (3–4) | None | 301 | 15–28 | 9–13 |
| Apr. 28 | at Nicholls | | Ben Meyer Diamond at Ray E. Didier Field • Thibodaux, LA | 1–6 | Hatcher, Cayden (3–5) | **Dallas, Jack (3–4)** | None | 329 | 15–29 | 9–14 |
| Apr. 29 | at Nicholls | | Ben Meyer Diamond at Ray E. Didier Field • Thibodaux, LA | 2–5 | Bedevian, Jacob (2–6) | **Blanchard, Jason (0–5)** | Bahlinger, Christian (5) | 377 | 15–30 | 9–15 |
| Apr. 30 | at Rice* | | Reckling Park • Houston, TX | 1–2 | **Jackson Parthasarthy (3–3)** | **Rich, Taylor (1–2)** | Dane Acker (2) | 3,737 | 15–31 | |

May (4–6)
| Date | Opponent | Rank | Site/stadium | Score | Win | Loss | Save | Attendance | Overall record | SLC Record |
|---|---|---|---|---|---|---|---|---|---|---|
| May 2 | at Rice* | | Reckling Park • Houston, TX | 1–2 | Jackson Parthasarthy (3–3) | **Rich, Taylor (1–2)** | Dane Acker (2) | 3,737 | 15–31 | |
| May 4 | at TCU* | | Lupton Stadium • Fort Worth, TX | 0–2 | Lodolo (6–3) | **Driskill, Tanner (5–4)** | Coughlin (1) | 3,771 | 15–32 | |
| May 5 | at TCU* | | Lupton Stadium • Fort Worth, TX | 3–4 | Eissler (4–1) | **Sills, Noah (3–5)** | Coughlin (2) | 4,126 | 15–33 | |
| May 6 | at TCU* | | Lupton Stadium • Fort Worth, TX | 0–11 | Green (2–1) | **Blanchard, Jason (0–6)** | None | 4,126 | 15–34 | |
| May 11 | at Stephen F. Austin | | Jaycees Field • Nacogdoches, TX | 3–5 | Norton, Jake (2–2) | **Driskill, Tanner (5–5)** | Gamez, Jesus (2) | 187 | 15–35 | 9–16 |
| May 12 | at Stephen F. Austin | | Jaycees Field • Nacogdoches, TX | 7–3 | **Erickson, Ryan (2–0)** | Adams, Cody (1–1) | None | 172 | 16–35 | 10–16 |
| May 13 | at Stephen F. Austin | | Jaycees Field • Nacogdoches, TX | 2–4 | Adams, Cody (2–1) | **Erickson, Ryan (2–1)** | None | 143 | 16–36 | 10–17 |
| May 17 | McNeese | | Vincent–Beck Stadium • Beaumont, TX | 12–5 | **Driskill, Tanner (6–5)** | Anderson, Grant (4–6) | None | 187 | 17–36 | 11–17 |
| May 18 | McNeese | | Vincent–Beck Stadium • Beaumont, TX | 6–2 | **Erickson, Ryan (3–1)** | Anderson, Aidan (5–6) | None | 111 | 18–36 | 12–17 |
| May 19 | McNeese | | Vincent–Beck Stadium • Beaumont, TX | 6–4 | **Blanchard, Jason (1–6)** | King, Bryan (3–5) | **Erickson, Ryan (4)** | 787 | 19–36 | 13–17 |

Legend: = Win = Loss = Canceled
Bold = Lamar team member
Rankings are based on the team's current ranking in the D1Baseball poll.
