= Joey Butler =

American baseball player (born 1986)

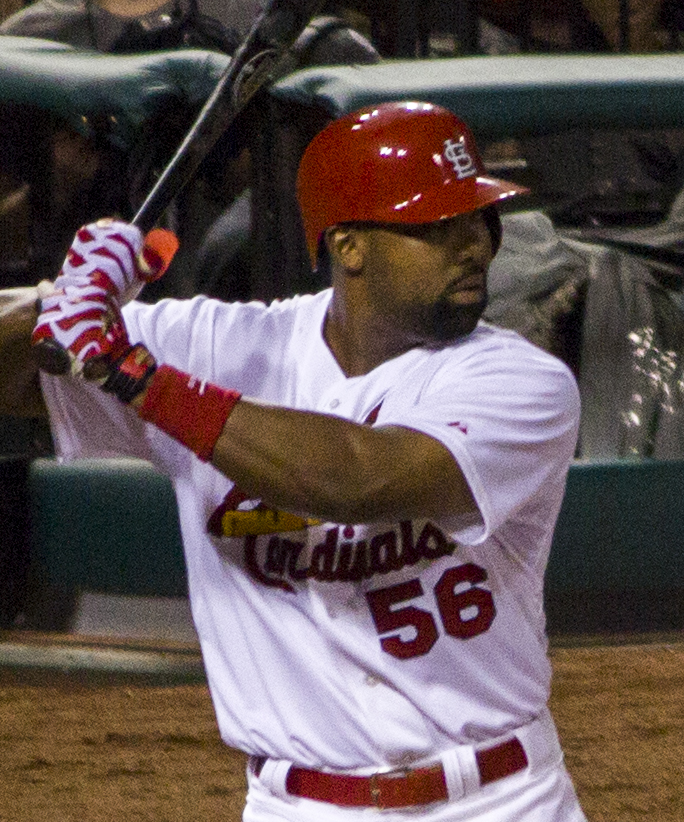
- Butler with the St. Louis Cardinals in 2014
- Designated hitter / Left fielder
- Born: March 12, 1986 (age 40); Pascagoula, Mississippi, U.S.
- Batted: Right Threw: Right

Professional debut
- MLB: August 7, 2013, for the Texas Rangers
- NPB: July 1, 2014, for the Orix Buffaloes

Last appearance
- MLB: October 4, 2015, for the Tampa Bay Rays
- NPB: August 13, 2014, for the Orix Buffaloes

MLB statistics
- Batting average: .274
- Hits: 75
- Home runs: 8
- Runs batted in: 31

NPB statistics
- Batting average: .231
- Hits: 12
- Home runs: 2
- Runs batted in: 6
- Stats at Baseball Reference

Teams
- Texas Rangers (2013); St. Louis Cardinals (2014); Orix Buffaloes (2014); Tampa Bay Rays (2015)

Joseph Frank Butler (born March 12, 1986) is an American former professional baseball designated hitter and left fielder. He played in Major League Baseball (MLB) for the Texas Rangers, Tampa Bay Rays, and St. Louis Cardinals, and in Nippon Professional Baseball (NPB) for the Orix Buffaloes.

Butler is the only player since at least 1901 who hit two home runs in his final major league game.

== Background ==
Born and raised in Pascagoula, Mississippi, Butler attended Pascagoula High School. For the Pascagoula Panthers, Butler played baseball, football, and basketball. A standout athlete, Butler later attended Mississippi Gulf Coast Community College before transferring to the University of New Orleans. At New Orleans, Butler was teammates with Johnny Giavotella, and the school made back-to-back NCAA tournament appearances. In his two seasons at New Orleans, Butler had a batting line of .342/.403/.541 in 119 games.

== Career ==
=== Texas Rangers ===
Butler was selected by the Texas Rangers in the 15th round of the 2008 Major League Baseball draft, as a right fielder. Despite hitting exceptionally well in college, scouts were concerned with Butler's defensive abilities. He made his professional debut with the Low-A Spokane Indians, batting .301/.417/.434 with 4 home runs and 31 RBI in 62 games. In 2009, Butler played for the High-A Bakersfield Blaze, hitting .280/.343/.416 with 12 home runs and 76 RBI. The following season, he played for the Double-A Frisco RoughRiders, posting a .277/.340/.409 slash with 10 home runs and 58 RBI in 132 games. For the 2011 season, Butler split the year between Frisco and the Triple-A Round Rock Express, hitting a cumulative .313/.388/.483 with a career-high 14 home runs and 61 RBI. Butler returned to Round Rock for the 2012 season, slashing .290/.392/.473 with new career-highs in home runs (20) and RBI (78). He began the 2013 season with Round Rock.

On August 5, 2013, The Rangers selected Butler to the 40-man roster and called him up to the majors for the first time. He made his MLB debut as a pinch hitter for Leonys Martín, but lined out against Los Angeles Angels pitcher Nick Maronde in his only at-bat. Butler was optioned back to the Triple-A Round Rock Express on August 10 to make room for Alex Ríos, but was recalled on September 3 when major league rosters expanded. Butler went 4-for-12 in 8 games for Texas before he was designated for assignment on September 30.

=== St. Louis Cardinals ===
On October 3, 2013, Butler was claimed off waivers by the St. Louis Cardinals. On March 27, 2014, Butler was outrighted off of the 40-man roster and assigned to the Triple-A Memphis Redbirds. On May 9, Butler was selected to the active roster. He made his Cardinals debut on May 10, 2014, after getting called up on May 9. He struck out, pinch-hitting in the seventh inning at Pittsburgh. He was optioned to Memphis on May 21 after going 0-for-5 in 6 games and was granted his outright release by St. Louis two days later to pursue an opportunity in Japan.

=== Orix Buffaloes ===
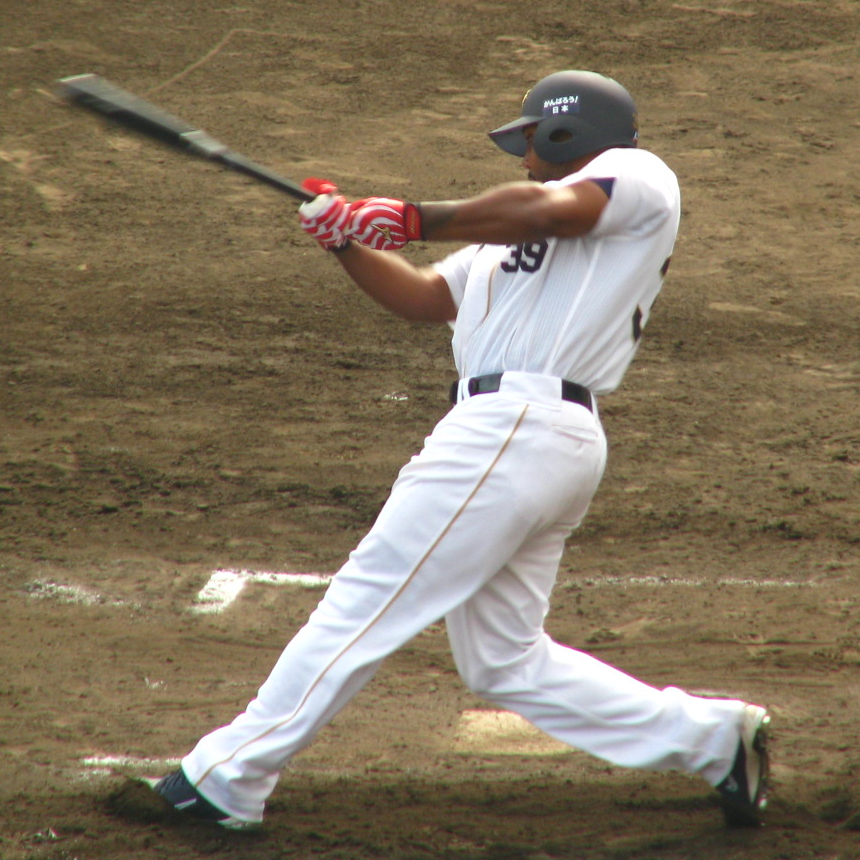
Butler batting for the Orix Buffaloes in 2014

After he was given his release by the Cardinals, Butler had his contract purchased by the Orix Buffaloes of the Nippon Professional Baseball League of Japan on May 23, 2014. He made his NPB debut on July 1, 2014. In 21 games as a right fielder for the Buffaloes, Butler hit .231 with two home runs and six RBIs. He became a free agent after the season.

=== Tampa Bay Rays ===
On January 10, 2015, Butler signed a minor league deal with the Tampa Bay Rays organization. He was assigned to the Triple-A Durham Bulls to begin the year before being selected to the major leagues on May 3. He hit his first MLB home run on May 4, a two-run homer off of Boston Red Sox starter Clay Buchholz. On July 1, he broke up Carlos Carrasco’s 8 2/3 innings and two-strike long no-hitter with a single. In 88 games for Tampa Bay, Butler slashed .276/.326/.416 with 8 home runs and 30 RBI. On December 3, 2015, Butler was designated for assignment following the team's acquisition of Hank Conger.

=== Cleveland Indians ===
On December 7, 2015, Butler was claimed off waivers by the Cleveland Indians. After failing to make the 25-man roster out of spring training, Butler was optioned to the Triple-A Columbus Clippers. Butler was designated for assignment on July 31, 2016, to make room on the 40-man roster for Andrew Miller, and was outrighted to Triple-A on August 5. He finished the year with Columbus, hitting .240/.318/.344 with 8 home runs and 42 RBI in 118 games. Butler elected free agency on October 3, 2016.

=== Washington Nationals ===
On February 10, 2017, Butler signed a minor league contract with the Washington Nationals organization. Butler spent the year with the Triple-A Syracuse Chiefs, but appeared in just 28 games due to injury and hit only .215/.311/.329 with 2 home runs and 8 RBI. He elected free agency following the season on November 6.

== Personal life ==
Butler is married and has two children, a daughter and a son.
