= 1982 Major League Baseball draft =

Baseball draft of amateur players

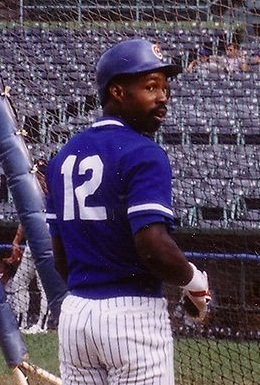
- Shawon Dunston, first draft pick

General information
- Date: June 1982

Overview
- 832 total selections
- First selection: Shawon Dunston; Chicago Cubs
- First round selections: 28
- Hall of Famers: 2: SS Barry Larkin; P Randy Johnson

The 1982 Major League Baseball draft took place in June 1982. The draft saw the Chicago Cubs select Shawon Dunston first overall.

== First round selections ==
= All-Star	= Baseball Hall of Famer

The following are the first round picks in the 1982 Major League Baseball draft.

Pick	Player	Team	Position	Hometown/School
1	Shawon Dunston	Chicago Cubs	Shortstop	Thomas Jefferson High School (Brooklyn, NY)
2	Augie Schmidt	Toronto Blue Jays	Shortstop	University of New Orleans
3	Jimmy Jones	San Diego Padres	Pitcher	Thomas Jefferson High School (Dallas, TX)
4	Bryan Oelkers	Minnesota Twins	Pitcher	Wichita State University
5	Dwight Gooden	New York Mets	Pitcher	Hillsborough High School
6	Spike Owen	Seattle Mariners	Shortstop	University of Texas
7	Sam Khalifa	Pittsburgh Pirates	Shortstop	Sahuaro High School
8	Bob Kipper	California Angels	Pitcher	Aurora Central Catholic High School
9	Duane Ward	Atlanta Braves	Pitcher	Farmington High School
10	John Morris	Kansas City Royals	Outfield	Seton Hall University
11	Steve Stanicek	San Francisco Giants	First Base	Nebraska Cornhuskers
12	Mark Snyder	Cleveland Indians	Pitcher	Bearden High School
13	John Russell	Philadelphia Phillies	Catcher	University of Oklahoma
14	Ron Karkovice	Chicago White Sox	Catcher	Boone High School
15	Steve Swain	Houston Astros	Outfield	Grossmont High School
16	Sam Horn	Boston Red Sox (Note: Pick from Texas Rangers as compensation for signing of free agent Frank Tanana)	First Base	Morse High School
17	Tony Woods	Chicago Cubs (Note: Pick from Montreal Expos as compensation for signing of free agent Tim Blackwell)	Shortstop	Whittier College
18	Rob Parkins	Boston Red Sox	Pitcher	Cerritos High School
19	Franklin Stubbs	Los Angeles Dodgers	First Base	Virginia Tech
20	Rich Monteleone	Detroit Tigers	Pitcher	Tampa Catholic High School
21	Todd Worrell	St. Louis Cardinals	Pitcher	Biola University
22	Scott Jones	Cincinnati Reds (Note: Pick from New York Yankees as compensation for signing of free agent Dave Collins)	Pitcher	Hinsdale South High School
23	Billy Hawley	Cincinnati Reds	Pitcher	Brookland Cayce High School
24	Joe Kucharski	Baltimore Orioles	Pitcher	University of South Carolina
25	Dale Sveum	Milwaukee Brewers	Shortstop	Pinole Valley High School
26	Jeff Ledbetter	Boston Red Sox (Note: Pick from Oakland Athletics as compensation for signing of free agent Joe Rudi)	First baseman	Florida State University
27	Stan Boderick	Chicago Cubs (Note: Supplemental pick as compensation for signing of free agent Tim Blackwell)	Outfield	Robinson High School
28	Robert Jones	Cincinnati Reds (Note: Supplemental pick as compensation for signing of free agent Dave Collins)	First baseman	Proviso East HS (Maywood, IL)

== Other notable players ==
- David Wells†, 2nd round, 30th overall by the Toronto Blue Jays
- Allan Anderson, 2nd round, 32nd overall by the Minnesota Twins
- Barry Bonds†, 2nd round, 39th overall by the San Francisco Giants, but did not sign
- Lance McCullers, 2nd round, 41st overall by the Philadelphia Phillies
- Bo Jackson, 2nd round, 50th overall by the New York Yankees, but did not sign
- Barry Larkin‡, 2nd round, 51st overall by the Cincinnati Reds, but did not sign
- Steve Ontiveros†, 2nd round, 54th overall by the Oakland Athletics
- Jimmy Key†, 3rd round, 56th overall by the Toronto Blue Jays
- Roger McDowell, 3rd round, 59th overall by the New York Mets
- Zane Smith, 3rd round, 63rd overall by the Atlanta Braves
- Kenny Williams, 3rd round, 68th overall by the Chicago White Sox
- Mike Greenwell†, 3rd round, 72nd overall by the Boston Red Sox
- Dan Pasqua, 3rd round, 76th overall by the New York Yankees
- Kirk McCaskill, 4th round, 88th overall by the California Angels
- Randy Johnson‡, 4th round, 89th overall by the Atlanta Braves, but did not sign
- Will Clark†, 4th round, 90th overall by the Kansas City Royals, but did not sign
- Mike Maddux, 5th round, 119th overall by the Philadelphia Phillies
- Steve Buechele, 5th round, 122nd overall by the Texas Rangers
- B.J. Surhoff†, 5th round, 128th overall by the New York Yankees, but did not sign
- Charlie O'Brien, 5th round, 132nd overall by the Oakland Athletics
- Pat Borders, 6th round, 134th overall by the Toronto Blue Jays
- Alvin Davis†, 6th round, 138th overall by the Seattle Mariners
- Terry Pendleton†, 7th round, 179th overall by the St. Louis Cardinals
- Bobby Witt, 7th round, 181st overall by the Cincinnati Reds, but did not sign
- Mitch Williams†, 8th round, 187th overall by the San Diego Padres
- Rafael Palmeiro†, 8th round, 189th overall by the New York Mets, but did not sign
- Mark McLemore, 9th round, 218th overall by the California Angels
- Tom Browning†, 9th round, 233rd overall by the Cincinnati Reds
- Pete Incaviglia, 10th round, 247th overall by the San Francisco Giants, but did not sign
- Vince Coleman†, 10th round, 257th overall by the St. Louis Cardinals
- Walt Weiss†, 10th round, 260th overall by the Baltimore Orioles, but did not sign
- Rob Dibble†, 11th round, 283rd overall by the St. Louis Cardinals, but did not sign
- Billy Ripken, 11th round, 286th overall by the Baltimore Orioles
- Jose Canseco†, 15th round, 392nd overall by the Oakland Athletics
- Fredi González, 16th round, 414th overall by the New York Yankees
- Chuck Crim, 17th round, 443rd overall by the Milwaukee Brewers
- Jim Morris, 18th round, 466th overall by the New York Yankees, but did not sign
- Bret Saberhagen†, 19th round, 480th overall by the Kansas City Royals
- Bob Patterson, 21st round, 524th overall by the San Diego Padres
- Jim Deshaies, 21st round, 542nd overall by the New York Yankees
- Mike Rizzo, 22nd round, 554th overall by the California Angels
- Jim Corsi, 25th round, 642nd overall by the New York Yankees
- Mike Henneman†, 27th round, 672nd overall by the Toronto Blue Jays, but did not sign
- Lance Johnson†, 31st round, 760th overall by the Seattle Mariners, but did not sign
- Bruce Ruffin, 31st round, 766th overall by the Philadelphia Phillies, but did not sign
- Kenny Rogers†, 39th round, 816th overall by the Texas Rangers
- Dave Martinez, 40th round, 819th overall by the Texas Rangers, but did not sign

† All-Star
‡ Hall of Famer

=== NBA/NCAA/NFL players drafted ===
- Urban Meyer, 13th round, 323rd overall by the Atlanta Braves
- Dell Curry, 37th round, 810th overall by the Texas Rangers, but did not sign
- Rodney Carter, 38th round, 813th overall by the Texas Rangers, but did not sign

Preceded by Mike Moore	1st Overall Picks; Shawon Dunston	Succeeded by Tim Belcher
