= Jim Bullinger =

American baseball player (born 1965)

- Pitcher
- Born: August 21, 1965 (age 60); New Orleans, Louisiana, U.S.
- Batted: Right Threw: Right

MLB debut
- May 27, 1992, for the Chicago Cubs

Last MLB appearance
- April 7, 1998, for the Seattle Mariners

MLB statistics
- Win–loss record: 34–41
- Earned run average: 5.06
- Strikeouts: 392
- Stats at Baseball Reference

Teams
- Chicago Cubs (1992–1996); Montreal Expos (1997); Seattle Mariners (1998)

James Eric Bullinger (born August 21, 1965) is an American former professional starting pitcher. He played for the Chicago Cubs (1992-1996), Montreal Expos (1997) and Seattle Mariners (1998) of Major League Baseball (MLB). He batted and threw right-handed. He is the brother of pitcher Kirk Bullinger. Jim Bullinger was converted to a pitcher in the Cubs' farm system, after initially playing as a shortstop. Before going pro, Bullinger played for the University of New Orleans, where his team made it to the 1984 College World Series.

== Career ==
He made his major league debut on May 27, 1992. On June 8 of that year, he hit a home run on the first pitch he faced in his first at-bat in the majors, one of only five pitchers to accomplish this feat.

In a seven-season career, Bullinger posted a 34–41 record with 392 strikeouts and a 5.06 ERA in 642.0 innings pitched.

He was a better than average hitting pitcher, batting .188 (31-for-165) with 14 runs, 9 doubles, 4 home runs, 19 RBI, 13 walks, 20 sacrifice hits and 2 sacrifice flies in 186 games.

He posted a perfect 1.000 fielding percentage, handling 171 total chances (72 putouts, 99 assists) without a miscue in his major league career.
