= Wally Whitehurst =

American baseball player (born 1964)

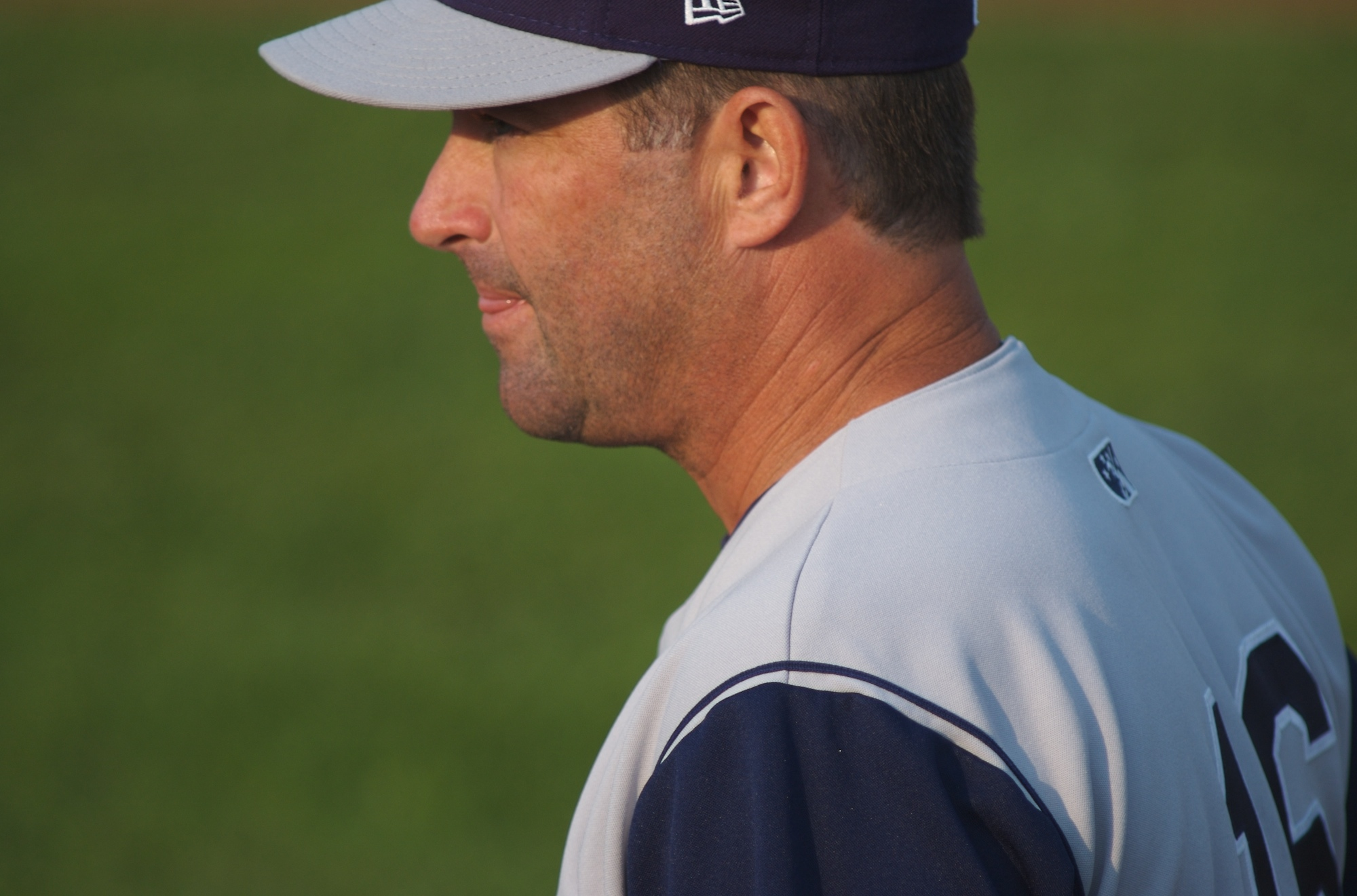
- Whitehurst with the Fort Wayne Wizards in 2007
- Pitcher
- Born: April 11, 1964 (age 62); Shreveport, Louisiana, U.S.
- Batted: Right Threw: Right

MLB debut
- July 17, 1989, for the New York Mets

Last MLB appearance
- August 29, 1996, for the New York Yankees

MLB statistics
- Win–loss record: 20–37
- Earned run average: 4.02
- Strikeouts: 313
- Stats at Baseball Reference

Teams
- New York Mets (1989–1992); San Diego Padres (1993–1994); New York Yankees (1996)
Medals
Men's baseball
Representing United States
Baseball World Cup
Bronze medal – third place	1984 Cuba	Team

Walter Richard Whitehurst (born April 11, 1964) is an American former professional baseball right-handed pitcher who played from 1989 to 1996 with the New York Mets, San Diego Padres and New York Yankees of Major League Baseball (MLB). Standing 6'3" and weighing 195 pounds, Whitehurst attended the University of New Orleans where he compiled a 37–15 record.

== Playing career ==
Originally selected by the Oakland Athletics in the third round of the 1985 MLB draft, Whitehurt became a member of the Mets organization when he was part of a three-team trade that took place on December 11, 1987. He was sent by Oakland, with Kevin Tapani, to the Mets. The Los Angeles Dodgers sent Bob Welch and Matt Young to the Athletics, and Jack Savage to the Mets. The Athletics then sent Alfredo Griffin and Jay Howell to the Dodgers, with the Mets sending Jesse Orosco to the Dodgers.

Whitehurst stayed in the minor leagues until July 17, 1989, when he made his MLB debut at the age of 25. In one inning of work, he allowed one hit and walked three batters, surrendering two earned runs. His season did improve though, and he finished with a 4.50 earned run average in nine games.

Whitehurst was used entirely as a reliever in 1990, appearing in 38 games, which was tied for third most on the team. In 65+ innings, he walked only nine batters and posted a 3.29 ERA.

Whitehurst appeared in 36 games in 1991, starting more than half of them. His 7–12 record was the worst among all the pitchers who had started more than 10 games with the Mets that year, as was his 4.19 ERA. He was limited to the bullpen during the last month of the season.

Although Whitehurst posted a 3.62 ERA in 1992, his record was 3–9. He was traded to the Padres after the season—he was sent with D. J. Dozier and Raul Casanova for Tony Fernández. Whitehurst spent two seasons with the Padres, 1993 and 1994, posting a record of 4-7 each season. After the 1994 season, he was released by the Padres and picked up by the San Francisco Giants. In April 1995, the Giants released him and he was signed by the Boston Red Sox. Whitehurst was released by the Red Sox in July, but picked up by the Toronto Blue Jays a short time later. After the 1995 season-a year in which he saw no major league action-he was granted free agency and picked up by the Montreal Expos. In June 1996, Whitehurst was selected off waivers from the Expos by the New York Yankees, and he started two games with them, winning one and losing one. In eight innings of big league work in 1996, he struck out only one batter (José Herrera).

Whitehurst appeared in his final big league game on August 29, 1996. Overall, he went 20–37 with a 4.02 ERA. He walked 130 batters and struck out 312 batters in 487+ innings of work. He batted .150 in 107 career at bats, and his fielding percentage was .948. He wore number 47 while with the Mets, 41 with the Padres and 55 with the Yankees. He spent five seasons with Dwight Gooden and David Cone-longer than any other teammates.

== Post-playing career ==
Since Whitehurst's playing days ended, he has been a pitching coach. He coached the Arizona League Padres in 2004, the Eugene Emeralds in 2005 and 2006, the Fort Wayne Wizards in 2007, and the Lake Elsinore Storm in 2008.

After serving as a substitute teacher at his old high school, Terrebonne High School in Houma, Louisiana, Whitehurst became the pitching coach for the Lynchburg Hillcats of the Carolina League. However, in 2010, the Pirates and Cincinnati Reds swapped minor league franchises. As a result, the Reds took control of the Hillcats, while the Pirates received Cincinnati's Sarasota Reds. The Pirates then moved Sarasota's operations to nearby Bradenton, where the club was renamed the Bradenton Marauders. Whitehurst then served as the pitching coach for the Altoona Curve.

Whitehurst is currently living in Houma and working as a salesman in the oil and gas industry.
