= Thomas Diamond =

American baseball player (born 1983)

- Pitcher
- Born: April 6, 1983 (age 43); New Orleans, Louisiana, U.S.
- Batted: Right Threw: Right

MLB debut
- August 3, 2010, for the Chicago Cubs

Last MLB appearance
- October 3, 2010, for the Chicago Cubs

MLB statistics
- Win–loss record: 1–3
- Earned run average: 6.83
- Strikeouts: 36
- Stats at Baseball Reference

Teams
- Chicago Cubs (2010)

Thomas Nicklaus Diamond (born April 6, 1983) is an American former professional baseball pitcher. He played in Major League Baseball (MLB) for the Chicago Cubs.

== College and draft ==
Diamond starred at the University of New Orleans. As a junior, he went 6–4, 2.38 ERA (30 ER/113.2 IP) in 17 starts for the Privateers, and was voted the Sun Belt Conference Pitcher of the Year. Diamond registered 4 double-digit strikeout games, including 17 strikeouts in a complete game win over Arkansas State University on March 26; he tied a school and Sun Belt Conference record with those 17 Ks. He was selected in the first round of the 2004 Major League Baseball draft by the Texas Rangers with the 10th overall pick.

== Pro career ==
=== Texas Rangers ===
Diamond quickly rose through the Rangers system, dominating the competition for Spokane in the Northwest League and Clinton in the Midwest League in 2004. In the fall of 2004, Diamond made a name for himself in an obscure Instructional League game during which he tripped and fell on the mound while attempting a pickoff move. The opposing Oakland A's prospects laughed at Diamond, who then walked off the mound towards the A's dugout and told them that the next person to laugh was going to be wearing a fastball in the temple. Diamond then threw his next pitch three feet behind the hitter at the plate and then delivered nine consecutive strikes to punch out the side.

In 2005, Diamond was named the Texas Rangers Nolan Ryan Minor League Pitcher of the Year in his first full professional season, splitting the campaign between Single-A Advanced Bakersfield in the California League and Frisco in the Double-A Texas League, combining to go 13–4 with a 3.53 ERA (59 ER/150.1 IP) and 169 strikeouts in 28 starts. He was ranked by Baseball America as the 3rd-best prospect in the Rangers system and the 4th-best prospect in the Texas League.

Diamond returned to Frisco in 2006 where he led the Texas League in strikeouts, but struggled with control. During spring training the following year, he experienced elbow soreness and was found to have a torn elbow ligament. He underwent Tommy John surgery and missed the entire 2007 season while recuperating. Diamond struggled in 2008 with a 6.20 ERA in 12 games for Double-A Frisco.

=== Chicago Cubs ===
On September 1, 2009, Diamond was designated for assignment by the Rangers, on September 4 the Cubs acquired him.

On September 21, 2009, the Cubs designated him for assignment, making room for Tyler Colvin, never throwing a pitch for any team in the system. Diamond reported to the club's Mexicali team, replacing pitcher Jeff Samardzija on the roster.

On August 3, 2010, Diamond made his major league debut against the Milwaukee Brewers. Diamond pitched 6 innings giving up 3 runs on 7 hits walking 3 and striking out 10 in a 4–3 loss to the Brewers. His 10 strikeouts tied Mark Prior for a franchise record for most strikeouts in a debut.

He was released on June 15, 2011, after recording an 8.66 ERA in nine starts and five relief appearances with the Iowa Cubs.

=== Minnesota Twins ===
The Minnesota Twins signed Diamond to a minor league contract on June 20 and assigned him to Triple-A Rochester. On July 23, he was released.

== Personal ==
Diamond married his wife Alison in December 2007 in Dallas, Texas. They have two children, Colten and Cameryn.
