= 2018 Southland Conference baseball tournament =

- Teams: 8
- Format: Double-elimination
- Finals site: Constellation Field; Sugar Land, Texas
- Champions: Northwestern State (1st title)
- Winning coach: Bobby Barbier (1st title)
- MVP: David Fry (Northwestern State)
- Television: ESPN+

2018 Southland Conference baseball standings
	Conf.				Overall
Team	W		L	PCT	W		L	PCT
Sam Houston St ‍†‍‍	24	–	6	.800	39	–	20	.661
Southeastern Louisiana ‍‍‍	21	–	9	.700	37	–	22	.627
Northwestern State ‍‍‡‍^{y}	18	–	12	.600	37	–	22	.627
Houston Baptist ‍‍‍	18	–	12	.600	29	–	30	.492
Central Arkansas ‍‍‍	17	–	13	.567	32	–	25	.561
McNeese State ‍‍‍	15	–	15	.500	25	–	33	.431
Texas A&M–Corpus Christi ‍‍‍	14	–	16	.467	30	–	26	.536
New Orleans ‍‍‍	14	–	16	.467	29	–	32	.475
Nicholls State ‍‍‍	14	–	16	.467	28	–	32	.467
Incarnate Word ‍‍‍	13	–	17	.433	29	–	26	.527
Lamar ‍‍‍	13	–	17	.433	19	–	36	.345
Stephen F. Austin ‍‍‍	9	–	21	.300	17	–	36	.321
Abilene Christian ‍‍‍	5	–	25	.167	21	–	33	.389
† – Conference champion ‡ – Tournament champion y – Invited to the NCAA tournament Rankings from Collegiate Baseball

The 2018 Southland Conference baseball tournament was held from May 23 through 26. The top eight regular season finishers of the league's thirteen teams met in the double-elimination tournament, which was held at Constellation Field in Sugar Land, Texas. As the winner of the tournament, Northwestern State earned the conference's automatic bid to the 2018 NCAA Division I baseball tournament. It was Northwestern State's first Tournament championship.

== Seeding and format ==
The top eight finishers from the regular season were seeded one through eight. They played a two bracket, double-elimination tournament, with the winner of each bracket meeting in a single championship final.

Team	W	L	Pct	GB	Seed
Sam Houston State	24	6	.800	—	1
Southeastern Louisiana	21	9	.700	3	2
Northwestern State	18	12	.600	6	3
Houston Baptist	18	12	.600	6	4
Central Arkansas	17	13	.567	7	5
McNeese State	15	15	.500	9	6
Nicholls State	14	16	.467	10	7
New Orleans	14	16	.467	10	8
Texas A&M-Corpus Christi	14	16	.467	10	–
Incarnate Word	13	17	.433	11	—
Lamar	13	17	.433	11	–
Stephen F. Austin	9	21	.300	15	—
Abilene Christian	5	25	.167	19	—

== Results ==
First round
1	Sam Houston State	3
8	New Orleans	4^{10}
4	Houston Baptist	14^{7}
5	Central Arkansas	4
1	Sam Houston State	4
5	Central Arkansas	2
3	Northwestern State	2
6	McNeese State	1
2	Southeastern Louisiana	4
7	Nicholls State	2
6	McNeese State	4
7	Nicholls State	10

Second round
8	New Orleans	3
4	Houston Baptist	1
1	Sam Houston State	4
4	Houston Baptist	6
3	Northwestern State	5
2	Southeastern Louisiana	1
7	Nicholls State	7
2	Southeastern Louisiana	6

Semifinals
8	New Orleans	3	6
4	Houston Baptist	4	1
3	Northwestern State	3	–
7	Nicholls State	2	–

Finals
8	New Orleans	5
3	Northwestern State	7

== Schedule ==
Game	Time*	Matchup^{#}	Television	Attendance
Wednesday, May 23
1	9:00 a.m.	No. 3 Northwestern State vs. No. 6 McNeese State	ESPN+	N/A
2	12:00 p.m.	No. 2 SE Louisiana vs. No. 7 Nicholls State	ESPN+	N/A
3	4:00 p.m.	No. 1 Sam Houston St vs. No. 8 New Orleans	ESPN+	N/A
4	7:00 p.m.	No. 4 Houston Baptist vs. No. 5 Central Arkansas	ESPN+	N/A
Thursday, May 24
5	9:00 a.m.	No. 6 McNeese State vs. No. 7 Nicholls State	ESPN+	N/A
6	12:00 p.m.	No. 1 Sam Houston St vs. No. 5 Central Arkansas	ESPN+	N/A
7	4:00 p.m.	No. 3 Northwestern State vs. No. 2 SE Louisiana	ESPN+	N/A
8	7:00 p.m.	No. 8 New Orleans vs. No. 4 Houston Baptist	ESPN+	N/A
Friday, May 25
9	9:00 a.m.	No. 2 SE Louisiana vs. No. 7 Nicholls State	ESPN+	N/A
10	12:00 p.m.	No. 4 Houston Baptist vs. No. 1 Sam Houston St	ESPN+	N/A
11	4:00 p.m.	No. 3 Northwestern State vs. No. 7 Nicholls State	ESPN+	N/A
12	7:00 p.m.	No. 8 New Orleans vs. No. 4 Houston Baptist	ESPN+	N/A
Saturday, May 26
13	1:00 p.m.	No. 8 New Orleans vs. No. 4 Houston Baptist	ESPN+	N/A
Championship	6:00 p.m.	No. 8 New Orleans vs. No. 3 Northwestern State	ESPN+	N/A
*Game times in CDT. # – Rankings denote tournament seed.

== All-Tournament Team ==
The following players were named to the All-Tournament Team.

Name	School
Pitchers
Kyle Arjona	New Orleans
Corey Gaconi	Southeastern Louisiana
Cayden Hatcher	Nicholls State
Position players
David Fry	Northwestern State
Orynn Veillon	New Orleans
Grant Buck	Houston Baptist
Brady Bell	Nicholls State
Beau Bratton	New Orleans
Ethan Valdez	Nicholls State
Luke Watson	Northwestern State
Riley McKnight	Sam Houston State
Jake Pulcheon	Houston Baptist

=== Most Valuable Player ===
David Fry was named Tournament Most Valuable Player. Fry was a first baseman for Northwestern State.
