= Mark Higgins (baseball) =

American baseball player (1963–2017)

- First baseman
- Born: July 9, 1963; Miami, Florida, U.S.
- Died: March 22, 2017 (aged 53); Duluth, Georgia, U.S.
- Batted: Right Threw: Right

MLB debut
- September 7, 1989, for the Cleveland Indians

Last MLB appearance
- September 24, 1989, for the Cleveland Indians

MLB statistics
- At bats: 10
- Hits: 1
- Batting average: .100
- Stats at Baseball Reference

Teams
- Cleveland Indians (1989)

Mark Douglas Higgins (July 9, 1963 – March 22, 2017) was an American Major League Baseball first baseman who played in six games during the 1989 Cleveland Indians season.

== Amateur career ==
A native of Miami, Florida, Higgins played college baseball at Chipola College and the University of New Orleans. While at Chipola, Higgins was selected by the Texas Rangers in both the January and June phases of the 1983 MLB draft, but did not sign. After the 1983 season, he played collegiate summer baseball with the Chatham A's of the Cape Cod Baseball League. He transferred to UNO for the 1984 season, and led the Privateers to the College World Series, a first for a Louisiana college. Higgins set the New Orleans single season home run record (24), and is a member of UNO's Athletic Hall of Fame.

== Professional career ==
Higgins was selected by the Cleveland Indians in the 1st round (7th Pick) of the 1984 MLB Draft. He spent seven seasons in the Cleveland minor league system, and was called up to the big league team for six games in 1989. In 11 major league plate appearances, he had one hit, scored one run, and walked once. Higgins died on March 22, 2017.
