= Joe Slusarski =

American baseball player (born 1966)

- Pitcher
- Born: December 19, 1966 (age 59); Indianapolis, Indiana, U.S.
- Batted: Right Threw: Right

MLB debut
- April 11, 1991, for the Oakland Athletics

Last MLB appearance
- June 21, 2001, for the Atlanta Braves

MLB statistics
- Win–loss record: 13–21
- Earned run average: 5.18
- Strikeouts: 173

CPBL statistics
- Win–loss record: 2–4
- Earned run average: 4.94
- Strikeouts: 31
- Stats at Baseball Reference

Teams
- Oakland Athletics (1991–1993); Milwaukee Brewers (1995); Sinon Bulls (1997); Houston Astros (1999–2001); Atlanta Braves (2001)
Medals
Baseball
Representing the United States
Olympic Games
Gold medal – first place	1988 Seoul	Team
Pan American Games
Silver medal – second place	1987 Indianapolis	Team
Baseball World Cup
Silver medal – second place	1988 Rome	Team

Joseph Andrew Slusarski (born December 19, 1966) is an American former professional baseball pitcher. He played in Major League Baseball (MLB) from 1991 to 2001 for the Oakland Athletics, Milwaukee Brewers, Houston Astros, and Atlanta Braves.

He helped the Athletics win the 1992 American League Western Division, the Astros win the 1999 and 2001 National League Central Division, and the Braves win the 2001 NL Eastern Division.

In 7 seasons he had a record of 13–21 in 118 games, with a 5.18 ERA. He was fired as pitching coach for the Frisco RoughRiders on May 20, 2009, and replaced by Jeff Andrews after the RoughRiders went 18–18 with a 4.56 ERA to begin the season.
