= Augie Schmidt =

American baseball player/coach

Carthage Firebirds
- Pitcher/Manager
- Born: August 10, 1962 (age 63); Kenosha, Wisconsin, U.S.
- Bats: Right Throws: Right
- Stats at Baseball Reference
Medals
Men's baseball
Representing the United States
World Games
Gold medal – first place	1981 Santa Clara	Team competition

August Robert Schmidt IV (born June 28, 1961) is an American former professional baseball shortstop and college baseball head coach.

== Early life and college ==
Schmidt attended Mary D. Bradford High School in Kenosha. He was drafted by the Cincinnati Reds in the ninth round (230th overall) of the 1979 Major League Baseball draft, but he did not sign with the team. Instead, he attended the University of New Orleans, where he played college baseball.

In 1981 he won a gold medal as a member of the United States national team in World Games I.

In 1982 he won the Golden Spikes Award, an award given to the top amateur baseball player in the United States.

== Minor league career ==
Schmidt was drafted second overall in the 1982 Major League Baseball draft by the Toronto Blue Jays. After signing with the team, he spent the rest of the 1982 season with the Kinston Blue Jays, hitting .297 in 50 games.

The following season he was promoted to the Knoxville Blue Jays, where he played in 135 games with a batting average of .266 and 28 doubles.

In 1984, he was again promoted, splitting time between Knoxville and the Syracuse Chiefs of the International League, although there he had problems with both his fielding and hitting and only had a batting average of .201 in 46 games.

Despite advancing to Triple-A by 1984, Schmidt never made the major leagues with the Blue Jays, because of issues with injuries and a logjam at shortstop in the Blue Jays organization. At the end Schmidt was traded to the San Francisco Giants along with Jim Gott for pitcher Gary Lavelle; he began the season with the Phoenix Giants, getting a fresh start in 1985. He played in 59 games for Phoenix and 12 more for the Shreveport Captains, then spent the 1986 season with the Kenosha Twins of the Minnesota Twins organization, where he hit .226 in 71 games.

== Coach at Carthage College ==
He retired in 1986 and in 1987 was an assistant coach at Carthage College in his hometown of Kenosha, Wisconsin, where his father, Augie Schmidt III, had been head coach from 1962 to 1980. He became the head baseball coach in 1988, and has been the head coach since. On October 1st, 2024 Augie Schmidt announced his retirement from coaching at the conclusion of the 2025 season. He named John Lequia his successor.

== Personal life ==
Schmidt's nephew, Gavin Lux, is an infielder and outfielder for the Tampa Bay Rays.
