= Johnny Giavotella =

American baseball player (born 1987)

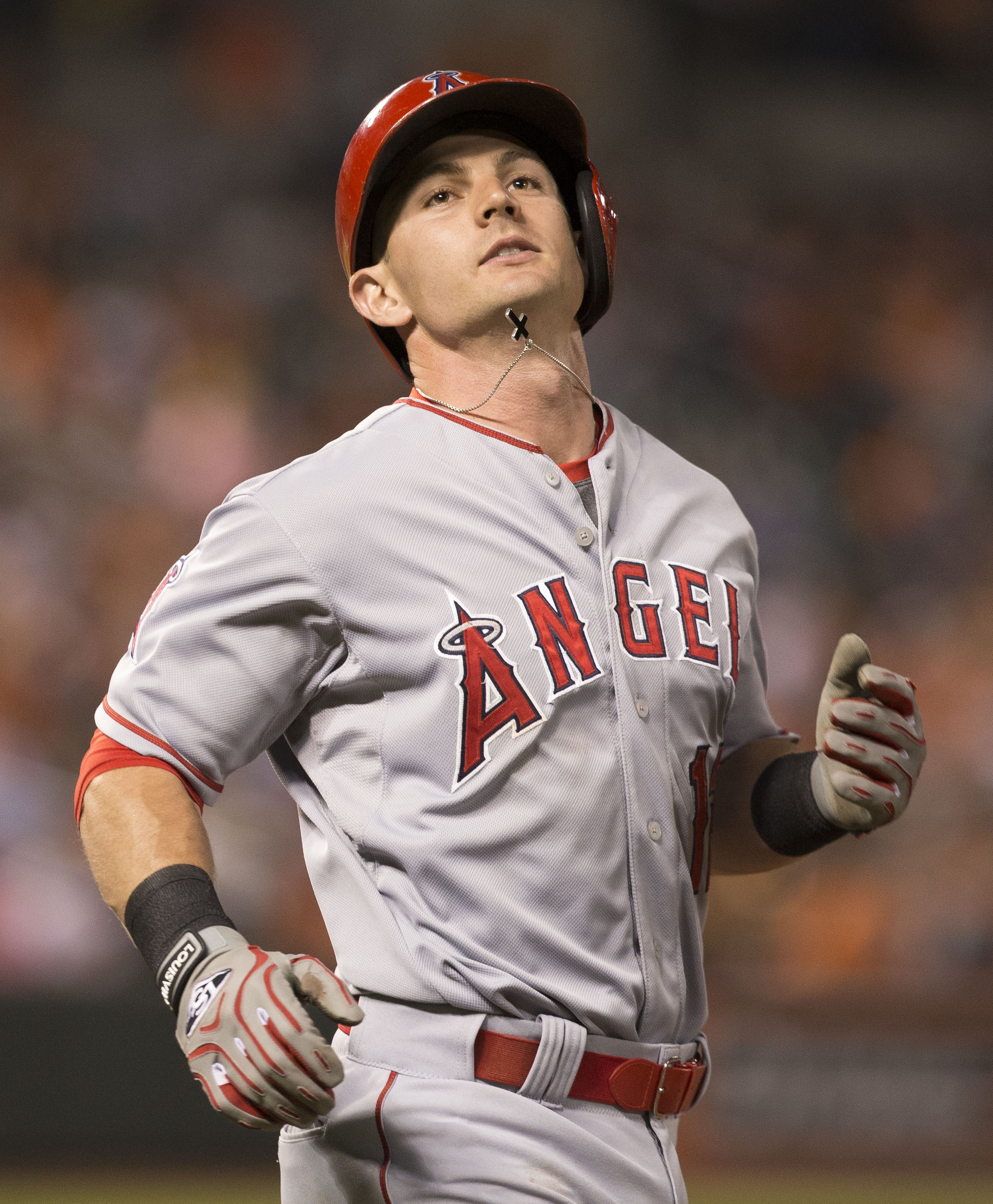
- Giavotella with the Los Angeles Angels of Anaheim in 2015
- Second baseman
- Born: July 10, 1987 (age 39); Metairie, Louisiana, U.S.
- Batted: Right Threw: Right

MLB debut
- August 6, 2011, for the Kansas City Royals

Last MLB appearance
- July 25, 2017, for the Baltimore Orioles

MLB statistics
- Batting average: .255
- Home runs: 14
- Runs batted in: 125
- Stats at Baseball Reference

Teams
- Kansas City Royals (2011–2014); Los Angeles Angels of Anaheim / Los Angeles Angels (2015–2016); Baltimore Orioles (2017)

Johnny Arthur Giavotella (born July 10, 1987) is an American former professional baseball second baseman. He played in Major League Baseball (MLB) for the Kansas City Royals, Los Angeles Angels, and Baltimore Orioles. He is currently the general manager for the University of New Orleans Privateers baseball program.

== Early life ==
Giavotella was born in Metairie, Louisiana, to Johnny Sr. and Cindy Giavotella. His family is Italian-American.

Giavotella attended St. Matthew the Apostle School in River Ridge, Jesuit High School in New Orleans, and the University of New Orleans, where he played college baseball for the New Orleans Privateers. In 2006 and 2007, he played collegiate summer baseball with the Harwich Mariners of the Cape Cod Baseball League.

== Career ==
=== Kansas City Royals ===
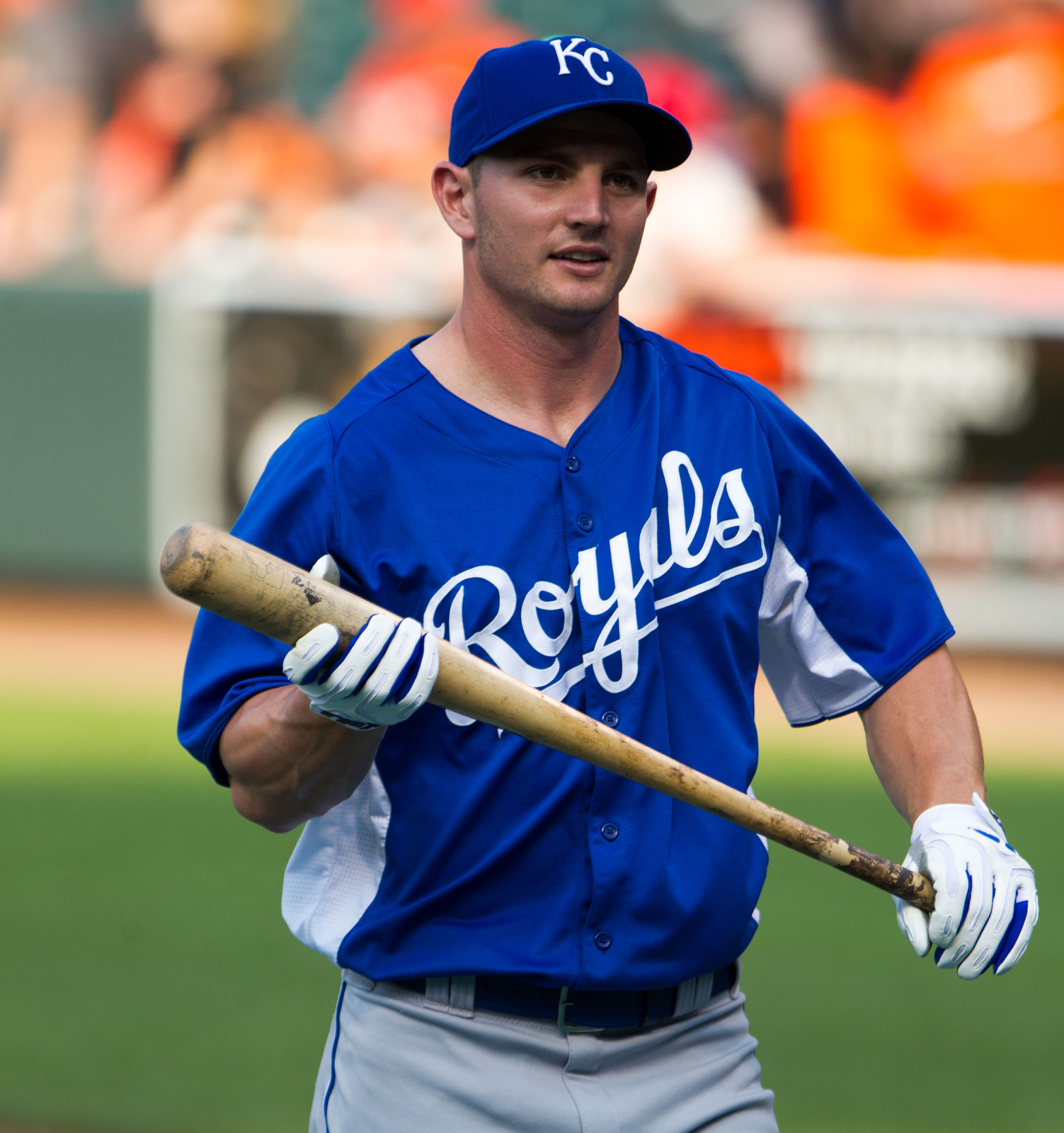
Giavotella during his tenure with the Kansas City Royals in 2012

The Kansas City Royals drafted Giavotella in the second round of the 2008 Major League Baseball draft. He played in Class-A in the Midwest League in 2008 and 2009, advanced to Double-A in 2010, and played in the Pacific Coast League and Triple-A Omaha in 2011.

Giavotella was called up to the majors for the first time on August 5, 2011. On August 7, 2011, Giavotella hit his first major league career home run off the Detroit Tigers' Max Scherzer. Giavotella would finish the 2011 season with 2 home runs and 21 RBI's in 46 games. In 2012, Giavotella split time between the majors and in AAA with the Royals. The Royals recalled Giavotella on June 29, 2013, after Jeff Francoeur was designated for assignment. Giavotella was designated for assignment on December 18, 2014. Giavotella's 2014 season was marred with inconsistency as he was called up to the Royals roster for just 12 games, hitting .216 while not displaying improvement since his rookie year.

=== Los Angeles Angels of Anaheim / Los Angeles Angels ===
On December 19, 2014, Giavotella was traded to the Los Angeles Angels of Anaheim in exchange for Brian Broderick. The Angels faced a stiff competition in spring training for the 2nd base position, as he battled against fellow infielders Josh Rutledge and Grant Green. After besting the competition, Giavotella cracked the opening day roster for the first time in his career. The 2015 season saw Giavotella manning second base for the majority of the season, setting career highs in every offensive category. In 2016, while he improved his defense dramatically from the prior season, Giavotella was designated for assignment towards the end of the month of August and was not called up when rosters expanded in September. Giavotella would finish his 2016 season with a career high 6 home runs and a .260 AVG in 99 games.

=== Baltimore Orioles ===
On February 1, 2017, Giavotella signed a minor league contract with the Baltimore Orioles. In July, the Orioles selected his contract and added him to the active roster. With an injury to starting shortstop J. J. Hardy, and a 5-game losing streak heading into the All-Star break, the team's looking for help in the field and at the plate. The 29-year-old infielder had been hitting .306/.368/.441 with 22 doubles, four triples, five homers and 45 RBIs in 83 games for Norfolk. His .306 average ranked him fourth in the International League. Orioles manager Buck Showalter said of him: “There’s no one who plays the game harder than Johnny . . [Norfolk manager Ron Johnson] said he was their best hitter, so we’ll bring him up here, see if there’s a need for what he brings.” On August 1, Giavotella was designated for assignment.

=== Miami Marlins ===
On December 1, 2017, Giavotella signed a minor league deal with the Miami Marlins. He was released from the organization on May 2, 2018.

=== Chicago White Sox ===
On May 12, 2018, Giavotella signed a minor league contract with the Chicago White Sox. He was released on June 21, 2018. Giavotella announced his retirement on August 11.

=== University Of New Orleans - General Manager ===
On August 12, 2025, Giavotella was named the first general manager of the Privateers baseball program. Giavotella said of the hiring: "I am incredibly honored to be the first General Manager of the University of New Orleans baseball program, I look forward to sharing my 11 years of professional experience and knowledge with the players and coaches in this locker room."
