= Ted Wood =

American baseball player

- Outfielder
- Born: January 4, 1967 (age 59); Chagrin Falls, Ohio, U.S.
- Batted: Left Threw: Left

MLB debut
- September 4, 1991, for the San Francisco Giants

Last MLB appearance
- April 22, 1993, for the Montreal Expos

MLB statistics
- Batting average: .183
- Home runs: 1
- Runs batted in: 7

CPBL statistics
- Batting average: .339
- Home runs: 61
- Runs batted in: 241

KBO statistics
- Batting average: .255
- Home runs: 1
- Runs batted in: 9
- Stats at Baseball Reference

Teams
- San Francisco Giants (1991–1992); Montreal Expos (1993); Brother Elephants (1997–1999); Lotte Giants (2000)
Medals
Baseball
Representing the United States
Olympic Games
Gold medal – first place	1988 Seoul	Team
Baseball World Cup
Silver medal – second place	1988 Rome	Team
Pan American Games
Silver medal – second place	1987 Indianapolis	Team
World Junior Baseball Championship
Silver medal – second place	1985 Albany	Team

Edward Robert "Ted" Wood (born January 4, 1967) is an American former professional baseball player. An outfielder, Wood played in Major League Baseball for the San Francisco Giants and Montreal Expos from 1991 to 1993. He also played in the Chinese Professional Baseball League for the Brother Elephants from 1997 to 1999, and in the Korea Baseball Organization for the Lotte Giants in 2000.
