= 2010 Southland Conference baseball tournament =

- Teams: 8
- Format: Double-elimination
- Finals site: Whataburger Field; Corpus Christi, Texas
- Champions: Lamar (3rd title)
- Winning coach: Jim Gilligan (3rd title)
- MVP: Anthony Moore (Lamar)

2010 Southland Conference baseball standings
| | Conf. | | | | | | Overall |
| Team | W | | L | | T | PCT | W | | L | | T | PCT |
|---|---|---|---|---|---|---|---|---|---|---|---|---|
| Texas State ‍†‍‍ | 23 | – | 10 | – | 0 | .697 | 38 | – | 22 | – | 0 | .633 |
| Northwestern State ‍‍‍ | 22 | – | 10 | – | 0 | .688 | 36 | – | 21 | – | 0 | .632 |
| Southeastern Louisiana ‍‍‍ | 21 | – | 12 | – | 0 | .636 | 40 | – | 19 | – | 0 | .678 |
| Stephen F. Austin ‍‍‍ | 20 | – | 12 | – | 0 | .625 | 34 | – | 20 | – | 0 | .630 |
| Texas–Arlington ‍‍‍ | 19 | – | 14 | – | 0 | .576 | 29 | – | 31 | – | 0 | .483 |
| Lamar ‍‍‡‍^{y} | 16 | – | 17 | – | 0 | .485 | 35 | – | 26 | – | 0 | .574 |
| McNeese State ‍‍‍ | 16 | – | 17 | – | 0 | .485 | 31 | – | 27 | – | 0 | .534 |
| Nicholls State ‍‍‍ | 15 | – | 18 | – | 0 | .455 | 27 | – | 29 | – | 0 | .482 |
| Texas–San Antonio ‍‍‍ | 13 | – | 20 | – | 0 | .394 | 22 | – | 28 | – | 0 | .440 |
| Sam Houston State ‍‍‍ | 11 | – | 22 | – | 0 | .333 | 19 | – | 36 | – | 0 | .345 |
| Texas A&M–Corpus Christi ‍‍‍ | 10 | – | 22 | – | 1 | .318 | 20 | – | 33 | – | 1 | .380 |
| Central Arkansas ‍‍‍ | 10 | – | 22 | – | 1 | .318 | 19 | – | 35 | – | 1 | .355 |
† – Conference champion ‡ – Tournament champion y – Invited to the NCAA tournament As of May 29, 2010; Rankings from Collegiate Baseball

The 2010 Southland Conference baseball tournament was held from May 26 through 29. The top eight regular season finishers of the league's twelve teams met in the double-elimination tournament held at Whataburger Field in Corpus Christi, Texas. The winner of the tournament, Lamar, earned the conference's automatic bid to the 2010 NCAA Division I baseball tournament.

== Seeding and format ==
The top eight finishers from the regular season were seeded one through eight. They played a two bracket, double-elimination tournament, with the winner of each bracket meeting in a single championship final.

| Team | W | L | T | Pct | Seed |
|---|---|---|---|---|---|
| Texas State | 23 | 10 | 0 | .697 | 1 |
| Northwestern State | 22 | 10 | 0 | .688 | 2 |
| Southeastern Louisiana | 21 | 12 | 0 | .636 | 3 |
| Stephen F. Austin | 20 | 12 | 0 | .625 | 4 |
| Texas–Arlington | 19 | 14 | 0 | .576 | 5 |
| McNeese State | 16 | 17 | 0 | .485 | 6 |
| Lamar | 16 | 17 | 0 | .485 | 7 |
| Nicholls State | 15 | 18 | 0 | .455 | 8 |
| Texas–San Antonio | 13 | 20 | 0 | .394 | – |
| Sam Houston State | 11 | 22 | 0 | .333 | – |
| Texas A&M–Corpus Christi | 10 | 22 | 1 | .318 | – |
| Central Arkansas | 10 | 22 | 1 | .318 | – |

== Results ==
First round
1 | Texas State | 2
8 | Nicholls State | 13
4 | Stephen F. Austin | 4
5 | Texas–Arlington | 10
1 | Texas State | 8
4 | Stephen F. Austin | 2
3 | Southeastern Louisiana | 7
6 | McNeese State | 8
2 | Northwestern State | 3
7 | Lamar | 4
3 | Southeastern Louisiana | 10
2 | Northwestern State | 4

Second round
8 | Nicholls State | 4
5 | Texas–Arlington | 5
1 | Texas State | 9
8 | Nicholls State | 5
6 | McNeese State | 7
7 | Lamar | 10
6 | McNeese State | 5
3 | Southeastern Louisiana | 4

Semifinals
5 | Texas–Arlington | 4 | 10
1 | Texas State | 5 | 15
7 | Lamar | 9 | —
6 | McNeese State | 3 | —

Final
1 | Texas State | 7
7 | Lamar | 17

== All-Tournament Team ==
The following players were named to the All-Tournament Team.

| Pos | Name | Team |
|---|---|---|
| C | Joey Latulippe | Lamar |
| 1B | Jordan Vaughn | Texas–Arlington |
| 2B | Clint Vest | Texas State |
| 3B | Kyle Kubitza | Texas State |
| SS | Jason Martinso | Texas State |
| OF | Anthony Moore | Lamar (MVP) |
| OF | Tyler Sibley | Texas State |
| OF | Michael Choice | Texas–Arlington |
| DH | Jeff McVaney | Texas State |
| P | Clint Dempster | Nicholls |
| P | Jonathan Dziedzic | Lamar |

== See also ==
2010 Southland Conference softball tournament
