= 2015 Lamar Cardinals baseball team =

American college baseball season

2015 Lamar Cardinals baseball
- Conference: Southland Conference
- Record: 21–31 (9–18 SLC)
- Head coach: Jim Gilligan (39th season)
- Assistant coaches: Jim Rickelfsen (17th season); Scott Hatten (15th season)
- Home stadium: Vincent–Beck Stadium (Capacity: 3,500)

2015 Southland Conference baseball standings
	Conf.						Overall
Team	W		L		T	PCT	W		L		T	PCT
Southeastern Louisiana ‍†‍‍	25	–	5	–	0	.833	42	–	17	–	0	.712
Northwestern State ‍‍‍	20	–	8	–	0	.714	31	–	23	–	0	.574
Nicholls State ‍‍‍	18	–	11	–	0	.621	34	–	19	–	1	.639
McNeese State ‍‍‍	18	–	12	–	0	.600	32	–	25	–	0	.561
Sam Houston State ‍‍‍	17	–	12	–	0	.586	31	–	28	–	0	.525
Central Arkansas ‍‍‍	16	–	14	–	0	.533	29	–	24	–	0	.547
Houston Baptist ‍‍‡‍^{y}	14	–	13	–	0	.519	28	–	27	–	0	.509
Texas A&M–Corpus Christi ‍‍‍	13	–	14	–	0	.481	26	–	27	–	0	.491
Abilene Christian * ‍‍‍	13	–	17	–	0	.433	17	–	38	–	0	.309
Stephen F. Austin ‍‍‍	11	–	18	–	0	.379	17	–	34	–	0	.333
Incarnate Word * ‍‍‍	11	–	19	–	0	.367	21	–	33	–	0	.389
Lamar ‍‍‍	10	–	19	–	0	.345	21	–	31	–	0	.404
New Orleans ‍‍‍	3	–	27	–	0	.100	14	–	40	–	0	.259
† – Conference champion ‡ – Tournament champion y – Invited to the NCAA tournament As of May 31, 2015; Rankings from Collegiate Baseball; *Ineligible for postseason play due to Division I transition

The 2015 Lamar Cardinals baseball team represented Lamar University in the 2015 NCAA Division I baseball season. The Cardinals played their home games at Vincent–Beck Stadium and were members of the Southland Conference. The team was coached by Jim Gilligan in his 39th season at Lamar.

== Previous season ==
In 2014, the Cardinals finished the season 8th in the Southland with a record of 31–25, 16–14 in conference play. They qualified for the 2014 Southland Conference baseball tournament and were eliminated in the first round. They failed to qualify for the 2014 NCAA Division I baseball tournament.

== Roster ==
2015 Lamar Cardinals roster
Pitchers: 5 Chase Angelle - (redshirt) Junior; 34 Joe Farley - Junior; 35 Travis Moore - Junior; 39 Cody Laird - Senior; 46 Matt White - Freshman; 50 Brandon Kirkham - Senior; 6 Kyle Leggett - Junior; 12 Derek Wade - Senior; 14 Brent Janak - Sophomore; 16 Eric Foshee - Freshman; 18 Collin Chapman - (redshirt) Junior; 23 Billy Love - (redshirt) Junior; 26 Sean Hudson - Freshman; 28 Jayson McKinley - Junior; 30 Enrique Oquendo - Junior; 31 Brent Brown - (redshirt) Sophomore; 32 Danny Fernandez - Senior; 33 Galen Andrews - Sophomore; 37 Ryan Cawthon - Junior; 40 Josh Crain - Freshman; 45 Connor Thomas - Junior; 48 Will Hibbs - Junior; 49 Charlie Farrugia - Freshman	Catchers: 3 Justin Eckols - Senior; 17 Brandon Provost - Senior; 44 Kyle Markum - Senior; Infielders: 2 Mason Salazar - Senior; 8 Ryan Erickson - Freshman; 9 Reed Seeley - Senior; 19 Tyler Sullivan - Senior; 20 Brennan Strovink - Freshman; 21 Jake Nash - Junior; 22 Kevin Santana - Senior; 27 Stijn van der Meer - Junior	Outfielders: 1 Joe Arechiga - (redshirt) Junior; 7 Brendan Satran - (redshirt) Sophomore; 24 Jacoby Middleton - Senior; 36 Cutter McDowell - (redshirt) Sophomore; 42 C J Moore - Freshman

== Coaches ==
2015 Lamar Cardinals baseball coaching staff
- 29 Jim Gilligan – Head coach – 38th year
- 4 Jim Rickelfsen – Associate head coach – 17th year
- 10 Scott Hatten – Assistant coach – 15th year
- 11 Brian Nelson – Volunteer assistant

== Preseason ==
The Cardinals were predicted to finish 8th in the Southland in the preseason Coaches and Sports Information Director polls.

On February 5, three Cardinals were named to Southland Conference All-Conference teams. Brandon Provost, playing catcher for the Cardinals, was named as a 1st Team All-Conference member, and Reed Seeley, as third baseman, and Kyle Markhum, as designated hitter, were named as 2nd Team All-Conference members.

== Season ==
=== February ===
Head coach Jim Gilligan achieved his 1,300th career win in the February 13 season opener pitting the Cardinals against the New Mexico State Aggies. He joined five other active college coaches with 1,300 or more career wins.

=== March ===
The Cardinals opened March play with a non-conference loss to Texas–Pan American in Edinburg, Texas. The month closed with the Cardinals losing another non-conference game against the Rice Owls. The Cardinals began conference play in March with series against Northwestern State, Central Arkansas, and New Orleans building a conference record of 3–6. The Cardinals also played two other conference foes during the month, Nicholls State and Abilene Christian, but those games were scheduled as non–conference games. The team had a 7–11 overall record during the month of March with a 13–15 for the season to date.

== April ==
The Cardinals opened April play with a conference win against Texas A&M–Corpus Christi at home. The month closed with a home loss to Texas Southern. The Cardinals split all four of the conference series only winning the series against Texas A&M–Corpus Christi. At the end of April, the team finished with a 5–7 conference record for the month and an 8–13 season to date conference record. In non-conference play, the Cardinals recorded one victory against Grambling State and had losses to LSU, Baylor, and Texas Southern. The team had a 6–10 overall record during the month of April with a 19–25 for the season to date.

== May ==
The Cardinals opened May play with a five-game losing streak. The team ended the month with a record of 2–6 and were eliminated as a possible contender in postseason play on May 9. The team ended the season with a 21–31 overall record and a 10–19 record in conference play. The Cardinals ended the season in 12th place in Southland Conference play.

== Schedule ==
Legend
	Lamar win
	Lamar loss
	Postponement
**Bold**	Lamar team member

2015 Lamar Cardinals baseball game log

February (6–4)
Date	Opponent	Site/stadium	Score	Win	Loss	Save	Attendance	Overall record	SLC Record
Feb 13	New Mexico State	Vincent–Beck Stadium • Beaumont, TX	**W** 7–6	**Andrews, G.** (1–0)	Higginbotham (1–0)	None	764	1–0	
Feb 14	Illinois	Vincent–Beck Stadium • Beaumont, TX	**L** 1–8	Kravetz, J. (1–0)	**Angelle, C.** (0–1)	Nielsen, J.D (1)	1,032	1–1	
Feb 14	New Mexico State	Vincent–Beck Stadium • Beaumont, TX	**W** 9–2	**Fernandez, D** (1–0)	Conard (0–1)	None	1,032	2–1	
Feb 15	Illinois	Vincent–Beck Stadium • Beaumont, TX	**L** 3–9	Jay, T. (1–0)	**Foshee, E.** (0–1)	None	811	2–2	
Feb 20	Manhattan	Vincent–Beck Stadium • Beaumont, TX	**W** 14–1	**Fernandez, D** (2–0)	McClennan, S (0–1)	None	611	3–2	
Feb 20	Manhattan	Vincent–Beck Stadium • Beaumont, TX	**W** 2–1	**Angelle, C.** (1–1)	Scarinci (0–1)	None	611	4–2	
Feb 21	Manhattan	Vincent–Beck Stadium • Beaumont, TX	**W** 11–7	**Hibbs, W.** (1–0)	Jacques (0–1)	None	N/A	5–2	
Feb 21	Manhattan	Vincent–Beck Stadium • Beaumont, TX	**W** 12–0	**Foshee, E.** (1–1)	Arntsen (0–1)	None	697	6–2	
Feb 27	at Texas–Pan American	Edinburg Stadium • Edinburg, TX	**L** 2–5	Gonzalez, J (1–0)	**Andrews, G.** (1–1)	None	497	6–3	
Feb 28	at Texas–Pan American	Edinburg Stadium • Edinburg, TX	**L** 8–11	Martinez, I (1–1)	**Kirkham, B.** (0–1)	Padron, A (5)	312	6–4	

March (7–11)
Date	Opponent	Site/stadium	Score	Win	Loss	Save	Attendance	Overall record	SLC Record
Mar 1	at Texas–Pan American	Edinburg Stadium • Edinburg, TX	**L** 4–6	Quinonez, R (1–0)	**Hibbs, W.** (1–1)	Padron, A (6)	328	6–5	
Mar 3	Prairie View A&M	Vincent–Beck Stadium • Beaumont, TX	**W** 4–3	**Farley, J.** (1–0)	E.Robledo (0–1)	None	573	7–5	
Mar 6	Northwestern State	Vincent–Beck Stadium • Beaumont, TX	**L** 2–4	Oller, A. (2–1)	**Fernandez, D** (2–1)	None	607	7–6	0–1
Mar 7	Northwestern State	Vincent–Beck Stadium • Beaumont, TX	**L** 6–9	Oller, J. (3–0)	**Angelle, C.** (1–2)	Hymel, C. (1)		7–7	0–2
Mar 8	Northwestern State	Vincent–Beck Stadium • Beaumont, TX	**L** 1–3	Stovall, J. (2–1)	**Foshee, E.** (1–2)	Smith, B. (2)	647	7–8	0–3
Mar 13	at Central Arkansas	Bear Stadium • Conway, AR	L 4–8	Gilmore, C. (2–2)	**Fernandez, D** (2–2)	None	315	7–9	0–4
Mar 14	at Central Arkansas	Bear Stadium • Conway, AR	**L** 4–2	Hagerla, B. (3–0)	**Angelle, C.** (1–3)	Stitch, B. (1)	275	7–10	0–5
Mar 15	at Central Arkansas	Bear Stadium • Conway, AR	**L** 0–8	Echols, R. (2–0)	**Foshee, E.** (1–3)	None	412	7–11	0–6
Mar 17	at Nicholls State	Ray E. Didier Field • Thibodaux, LA	**L** 0–1	Deemes, R. (3–0)	**McKinley, J.** (0–1)	Holmes, S. (7)	788	7–12	–
Mar 18	at Nicholls State	Ray E. Didier Field • Thibodaux, LA	**W** 9–7 ^{(11)}	**Kirkham, B.** (1–1)	Petty, R. (1–1)	Cawthon, R. (1)	438	8–12	–
Mar 20	at New Orleans	Maestri Field • New Orleans, LA	**W** 8–1	**Angelle, C.** (2–3)	Smith, A. (2–4)	None	462	9–12	1–6
Mar 21	at New Orleans	Maestri Field • New Orleans, LA	**W** 5–4	**Fernandez, D** (3–2)	Priddle, J. (4–2)	Wade, D. (2)		10–12	2–6
Mar 21	at New Orleans	Maestri Field • New Orleans, LA	**W** 17–2 ^{(7)}	**Andrews, G.** (2–1)	Martinez, D. (0–2)	None	492	11–12	3–6
Mar 24	at Houston	Cougar Field • Houston, TX	**L** 5–6 ^{(10)}	Moore (1–0)	**Oquendo, E.** (0–1)	None	1,502	11–13	3–6
Mar 27	Abilene Christian	Vincent–Beck Stadium • Beaumont, TX	**W** 6–1	**Angelle, C.** (3–3)	G. deMeyere (2–3)	None	777	12–13	3–6
Mar 28	Abilene Christian	Vincent–Beck Stadium • Beaumont, TX	**W** 8–4	**Fernandez, D** (4–2)	A. Mason (0–4)	None	776	13–13	3–6
Mar 29	Abilene Christian	Vincent–Beck Stadium • Beaumont, TX	**L** 4–5	L. Zotyka (2–1)	**Leggett, K.** (0–1)	N. Palacios (1)	702	13–14	3–6
Mar 31	Rice	Vincent–Beck Stadium • Beaumont, TX	**L** 3–4	A.Orewiler (4–0)	**Janak, B.** (0–1)	Ditman (5)	853	13–15	3–6

April (6–10)
Date	Opponent	Site/stadium	Score	Win	Loss	Save	Attendance	Overall record	SLC Record
Apr 2	Texas A&M–Corpus Christi	Vincent–Beck Stadium • Beaumont, TX	**W** 3–0	**Angelle, C.** (4–3)	Danton, M (2–5)	**Wade, D.** (3)	587	14–15	4–6
Apr 3	Texas A&M–Corpus Christi	Vincent–Beck Stadium • Beaumont, TX	**L** 3–12	Belicek, T (3–3)	**Fernandez, D** (4–3)	None	723	14–16	4–7
Apr 4	Texas A&M–Corpus Christi	Vincent–Beck Stadium • Beaumont, TX	**W** 11–1	**McKinley, J** (1–1)	Harris, G (2–2)	None	705	15–16	5–7
Apr 7	Grambling State	Vincent–Beck Stadium • Beaumont, TX	**W** 11–4	**Foshee, E.** (2–3)	Mckinney (1–3)	None	649	16–16	5–7
Apr 11	at McNeese State	Cowboy Diamond • Lake Charles, LA	**L** 0–2	Fontenot, K. (5–3)	**Angelle, C.** (4–4)	Kober, C. (8)	N/A	16–17	5–8
Apr 11	at McNeese State	Cowboy Diamond • Lake Charles, LA	**W** 8–2	**McKinley, J.** (2–1)	Stremmel, E. (3–3)	**Wade, D.** (4)	684	17–17	6–8
Apr 12	at McNeese State	Cowboy Diamond • Lake Charles, LA	**L** 2–6	Kober, C. (3–1)	**Oquendo, E.** (0–2)	None	524	17–18	6–9
Apr 15	at LSU	Alex Box Stadium • Baton Rouge, LA	**L** 2–11	Bouman (1–1)	Love, B. (0–1)	None	9,947	17–19	6–9
Apr 17	Houston Baptist	Vincent–Beck Stadium • Beaumont, TX	**L** 2–3	McCollough (7–1)	**Wade, D.** (0–1)	Zarosky, D. (2)	634	17–20	6–10
Apr 19	Houston Baptist	Vincent–Beck Stadium • Beaumont, TX	**L** 3–4	Jones, Cu. (4–4)	**McKinley, J.** (2–2)	Martinez, J. (1)	636	17–21	6–11
Apr 19	Houston Baptist	Vincent–Beck Stadium • Beaumont, TX	**W** 5–0	**Leggett, K.** (1–1)	Wright, T. (6–4)	None	636	18–21	7–11
Apr 21	at Baylor	Baylor Ballpark • Waco, TX	**L** 6–8	Hessemer (4–1)	**Foshee, E.** (2–4)	Kirkland (1)	1,896	18–22	7–11
Apr 24	Incarnate Word	Vincent–Beck Stadium • Beaumont, TX	**W** 1–0	**Angelle, C.** (5–4)	Encina, G. (2–4)	None	808	19–22	8–11
Apr 25	Incarnate Word	Vincent–Beck Stadium • Beaumont, TX	**L** 0–2	Cooper, G. (5-5	**McKinley, J.** (2–3)	Shull, J. (1)	754	19–23	8–12
Apr 26	Incarnate Word	Vincent–Beck Stadium • Beaumont, TX	**L** 6–8	Looper, K. (2–5)	**Kirkham, B.** (1–2)	None	720	19–24	8–13
Apr 29	Texas Southern	Vincent–Beck Stadium • Beaumont, TX	**L** 2–6	Rios, R (5–1)	**Foshee, E.** (2–5)	None	644	19–25	8–13

May (2–6)
Date	Opponent	Site/stadium	Score	Win	Loss	Save	Attendance	Overall record	SLC Record
May 1	at Southeastern Louisiana	Pat Kenelly Diamond • Hammond, LA	**L** 0–6	Scioneaux, T (7–2)	**Angelle, C.** (5–5)	None	1,013	19–26	8–14
May 2	at Southeastern Louisiana	Pat Kenelly Diamond • Hammond, LA	**L** 2–5	Johnson, J. (9–1)	**Chapman, C.** (0–1)	Sceroler, M. (6)	876	19–27	8–15
May 3	at Southeastern Louisiana	Pat Kenelly Diamond • Hammond, LA	**L** 0–6	Cedotal, K. (7–2)	**Foshee, E.** (2–6)	None	969	19–28	8–16
May 8	Stephen F. Austin	Vincent–Beck Stadium • Beaumont, TX	**L** 0–1	Gann, C. (4–3)	**Angelle, C.** (5–6)	None	796	19–29	8–17
May 9	Stephen F. Austin	Vincent–Beck Stadium • Beaumont, TX	**L** 1–8	Mangham, D. (4–8)	**Chapman, C.** (0–2)	None	787	19–30	8–18
May 10	Stephen F. Austin	Vincent–Beck Stadium • Beaumont, TX	**W** 9–8 (10)	**Hibbs, W.** (2–1)	Wiedenfeld, (0–1)	None	742	20–30	9–18
May 15	at Sam Houston State	Don Sanders Stadium • Huntsville, TX	**L** 1–4	Godail, A. (4–6)	**Fernandez, D** (4–4)	Bisacca, A. (3)	824	20–31	9–19
May 16	at Sam Houston State	Don Sanders Stadium • Huntsville, TX	**W** 3–2 (10)	**McKinley, J.** (3–3)	Brinley, R. (1–5)	None	1,015	21–31	10–19

Note: Nicholls State and Abilene Christian series games were scheduled as non-conference games.
