= Will Davis (baseball) =

College baseball player for LSU (born 1984)

Current position
- Title: Head coach
- Team: Houston
- Conference: Big 12
- Record: 0–0 (–)

Biographical details
- Born: May 29, 1984 (age 42); Shreveport, Louisiana, U.S.

Playing career
- 2004–2007: LSU
- Position: Catcher

Coaching career (HC unless noted)
- 2009–2015: LSU (assistant)
- 2016: Lamar (assistant)
- 2017–2026: Lamar
- 2027–present: Houston

Administrative career (AD unless noted)
- 2008: LSU (BO)

Head coaching record
- Overall: 289–233 (.554)

Accomplishments and honors

Championships
- Southland tournament (2026); Southland regular season (2024)

Awards
- Southland Coach of the Year (2024)

William Randall Davis Jr. (born May 29, 1984) is an American college baseball coach and former catcher. Davis is the head coach of the Houston Cougars baseball team. Davis is the son of former college baseball coach Randy Davis who was an assistant coach at UL-Monroe, LSU, and South Carolina and the head coach at Louisiana Tech. The elder Davis died in February 2022. Will Davis is married to the former Danielle Hall of Bogalusa, Louisiana. She is a former cheerleader for the New Orleans Saints. The couple have three children Everly (2016), Coco (2020), and Crash (2022). Davis is the grandson of the former mayor of Natchitoches, Louisiana Robert Buford Deblieux and a distant cousin of the cajun chef Paul Prudhomme.

== Playing career ==
Davis attended Robert E. Lee High School (now Liberty Magnet High School) in Baton Rouge, Louisiana. Davis played for the school's varsity baseball team. Davis then enrolled at Louisiana State University, to play college baseball for the LSU Tigers baseball team.

Davis was a letterman on the 2004 College World Series team and a two-time SEC Academic Honor Roll selection.

== Coaching career ==
Davis began his coaching career in 2008 as the coordinator of baseball operations at LSU. In 2009, Davis was promoted to assistant coach. The Tigers won the 2009 College World Series. Davis quickly developed a reputation as a strong on-field coach and aggressive recruiter, particularly in his home state of Louisiana.

On January 15, 2016, Davis was the head coach in waiting of the Lamar Cardinals baseball program. In 2016 Davis spent the season at Lamar while serving as head coach in waiting and at times the acting head coach. The Cardinals went 35-19 defeating national powers Texas, Arizona, and LSU.

Davis was tasked with re-stocking a roster that had missed the 2015 and 2016 recruiting classes due to the retirement announcement and subsequent retirement of long-time Cardinals coach Jim Gilligan. With 13 seniors remaining from Gilligan's last year but no other classes in the program Davis was able to sign future MLB draft picks Carson Lance and Tanner Driskill late and put together a 33-25 season in his first campaign as head coach.

With the 13-man senior class leaving, Davis methodically built the program back up by bringing in nationally ranked recruiting classes for the first time in school history. The 2017 class was ranked #73 in the nation by Perfect Game (#1 in the Southland Conference while the 2018 class was ranked #92 nationally and #2 in the Southland. As the young players began to develop, Davis switched his recruiting approach to supplementing the program with older junior college players and received national rankings by the JUCO Baseball Blog of #22 in 2020 and #7 in 2021.

In 2021 the rebuild was complete with the Cardinals having a winning season and reaching the postseason for the first time since 2017.

The 2022 Lamar Cardinals enjoyed their best season in roughly a decade going 37-21 with a 20-10 record in the WAC good enough for a 2nd place finish. The Cardinals enjoyed wins over perennial powers Rice (twice), Houston, and eventual national runner-up Oklahoma.

Davis followed up 2022 with another successful season in 2023 going 32-23 and finishing in 3rd place in the Southland Conference. The Cardinals defeated Kansas State, Houston, Baylor, #5 Texas A&M, and eventual national semifinalist TCU. Lamar Catcher Ryan Snell was named Southland Conference Player of the Year and a Buster Posey Award Finalist.

The Cardinals finished 2024 with the best record in Lamar history at 44-15. The season was highlighted by a sweep of Big 12 Champion Oklahoma on the road. Davis earned the Clay Gould Coach of the Year award for the Southland's top coach. Brooks Caple won Southland Conference Pitcher of the Year and the Cardinals eclipsed the 40-win mark and won a conference championship for the first time since 2004. Davis was named to Baseball America's top 50 coaches to watch for the Summer of 2024.

The 2025 season produced many of the same results. The Cardinals finished with 40 wins in back-to-back seasons for the first time since 2003-2004. Damian Ruiz was named Southland Conference Hitter of the Year, marking the 3rd year in a row that the Cardinals had a POY (Snell & Caple).

Davis will begin his tenure as the head baseball coach at the University of Houston in 2027.

== Coaching catchers ==
Davis has developed a reputation as one of the premier catching coaches in the nation. Four of his catchers at LSU were drafted: Kade Scivicque (4th Round), Tyler Moore (5th Round) Michael Papierski (9th Round), and Chris Chinea (17th Round) while three more at Lamar have played professional baseball: Bryndan Arredondo (22nd Round), Anthony Quirion (free agent sign), and Ryan Snell (7th Round).

Michael Papierski has since made it to the Major Leagues while Scivicque and Ryan Snell were both named All-Americans and Buster Posey (formerly Johnny Bench) Award Finalists.

== Head coaching record ==
Record table
Season	Team	Overall	Conference	Standing	Postseason
Lamar Cardinals (Southland Conference) (2017–2021)
2017	Lamar	33–25	16–14	T–7th	
2018	Lamar	19–36	13–17	T–10th	
2019	Lamar	18–36	9–21	13th	
2020	Lamar	7–10	0–3		Season canceled due to COVID-19
2021	Lamar	25–23	17–19	8th	
Lamar Cardinals (Western Athletic Conference) (2022)
2022	Lamar	37–21	20–10	2nd (Southwest)	
Lamar Cardinals (Southland Conference) (2023–2026)
2023	Lamar	32–23	13–11	T–3rd	
2024	Lamar	44–15	17–7	1st	
2025	Lamar	40–17	20–10	3rd	
2026	Lamar	34–27	19–11	2nd	NCAA Regional
Lamar:		289–233 (.554)	144–123 (.539)		
Houston Cougars (Big 12 Conference) (2027–present)
2027	Houston	0–0	0–0		
Houston:		0–0 (–)	0–0 (–)		
Total:		289–233 (.554)			
National champion Postseason invitational champion Conference regular season champion Conference regular season and conference tournament champion Division regular season champion Division regular season and conference tournament champion Conference tournament champion

== See also ==
- List of current NCAA Division I baseball coaches
