= 2016 Lamar Cardinals baseball team =

American college baseball season

2016 Lamar Cardinals baseball
- Conference: Southland Conference
- Record: 35–19 (20–10 SLC)
- Head coach: Jim Gilligan (39th season)
- Assistant coaches: Will Davis (1st season); Scott Hatten (16th season)
- Home stadium: Vincent–Beck Stadium (Capacity: 3,500)

2016 Southland Conference baseball standings
| | Conf. | | | | Overall |
| Team | W | | L | PCT | W | | L | PCT |
|---|---|---|---|---|---|---|---|---|
| Sam Houston State ‍†‍‡‍^{y} | 24 | – | 6 | .800 | 42 | – | 22 | .656 |
| Southeastern Louisiana ‍‍‍^{y} | 22 | – | 8 | .733 | 40 | – | 21 | .656 |
| Lamar ‍‍‍ | 20 | – | 10 | .667 | 35 | – | 19 | .648 |
| Northwestern State ‍‍‍ | 20 | – | 10 | .667 | 33 | – | 24 | .579 |
| Central Arkansas ‍‍‍ | 16 | – | 14 | .533 | 29 | – | 27 | .518 |
| McNeese State ‍‍‍ | 15 | – | 15 | .500 | 31 | – | 25 | .554 |
| New Orleans ‍‍‍ | 14 | – | 16 | .467 | 31 | – | 26 | .544 |
| Stephen F. Austin ‍‍‍ | 14 | – | 16 | .467 | 30 | – | 30 | .500 |
| Nicholls State ‍‍‍ | 14 | – | 16 | .467 | 26 | – | 30 | .464 |
| Houston Baptist ‍‍‍ | 12 | – | 18 | .400 | 24 | – | 29 | .453 |
| Texas A&M-Corpus Christi ‍‍‍ | 8 | – | 20 | .286 | 19 | – | 32 | .373 |
| Abilene Christian * ‍‍‍ | 8 | – | 21 | .276 | 16 | – | 37 | .302 |
| Incarnate Word * ‍‍‍ | 5 | – | 22 | .185 | 13 | – | 38 | .255 |
† – Conference champion ‡ – Tournament champion y – Invited to the NCAA tournament * Ineligible for league and NCAA tournaments due to transition from Division II; As of June 11, 2016; Rankings from Collegiate Baseball

The 2016 Lamar Cardinals baseball team represented Lamar University in the 2016 NCAA Division I baseball season. The Cardinals played their home games at Vincent–Beck Stadium and are members of the Southland Conference. The team was coached by Jim Gilligan in his 39th and final season at Lamar.

== Previous season ==
In 2015, the Cardinals finished the season 11th in the Southland with a record of 21–31, 9–18 in conference play. They failed to qualify for the 2015 Southland Conference baseball tournament.

== Roster ==
2016 Lamar Cardinals roster
| Pitchers: 5 Galen Andrews - Junior; 6 Kyle Leggett - Senior; 11 Brent Janak - Junior; 12 Connor Thomas - Senior; 19 Billy Love - Senior; 20 Fernando Martinez - Senior; 22 Tyler Keegan - Sophomore; 27 Jimmy Johnson - Junior; 28 Jayson McKinley - Senior; 30 Enrique Oquendo - Senior; 31 Brett Brown - Junior; 34 Joe Farley - Senior; 35 Travis Moore - Senior; 37 Ryan Cawthorn - Senior; 40 Josh Crain - (redshirt) Freshman; 46 Matt White - (redshirt) Freshman; 48 Will Hibbs - Senior | Catchers: 32 Bryndan Arredondo - Junior; 33 Robin Adames - Freshman; Infielders: 2 Gaylen Tristan - Junior; 8 Ryan Erickson - (redshirt) Freshman; 9 Chaneng Varela - Junior; 17 Reid Russell - Junior; 18 Stijn van der Meer - Senior; 21 Jake Nash - Senior; 23 J. M. Kelly - Junior; 26 Brett Taff - Freshman; 44 Trey Silvers -Junion | Outfielders: 7 Brendan Satran - Junior; 24 Jacoby Middleton - Senior; 36 Cutter McDowell - (redshirt) Junior |

== Coaches ==
2015 Lamar Cardinals baseball coaching staff
- 29 Jim Gilligan - Head coach - 40th year
- 52 Will Davis - Head coach in Waiting - 1st year
- 10 Scott Hatten - Assistant coach - 15th year
- 50 Brandon Kirkham - Volunteer Assistant

== Preseason ==
=== Staff changes ===
On September 21, 2015, the Cardinals head coach, Jim Gilligan, announced he will be retiring at the conclusion of the 2016 season.

On January 15, 2016, Will Davis was named Jim Gilligan's successor beginning with the 2017 season. Davis was an assistant coach at LSU. Will Davis joined the Lamar coaching staff as an assistant coach as the Cardinals' third base and running coach on February 11, 2016. He fills the position left by Jim Ricklefsen's departure following 18 years as an assistant coach.

=== Preseason predictions and honors ===
The Cardinals were predicted to finish 9th in the Southland in the preseason Coaches and Sports Information Director polls.

On February 10, two Cardinals were named to preseason Southland Conference All-Conference teams. Stijn van der Meer, playing short stop for the Cardinals, was named as a 1st Team All-Conference member, and Jake Nash, as third baseman was named as 2nd Team All-Conference member.

== Season ==
=== February ===
The Cardinals began Coach Jim Gilligan's final season with six straight wins sweeping Southeast Missouri State and with wins over #23 Arizona and #7 LSU and one win over North Dakota State. The game against LSU set a new attendance record for Vincent–Beck Stadium with 3,563 fans in attendance. On the downside, the Cardinals finished the month and the North Dakota State series with three straight losses to the Bison.

The Cardinals finished the month with an overall 6–3 record.

=== March ===
The month started with a win against Prairie View A&M, a 2–1 split series against UTRGV, a 1–2 series split against Northwestern State to begin conference play, followed by a loss to Houston. The month ended with a seven-game winning streak sweeping Central Arkansas and New Orleans in conference play as well as a non-conference win against Texas.

The Cardinals had an 11–4 record for the month of March for a cumulative record of 17–7. They also ended the month with a 7–2 record in Southland Conference play. The month ended with a 7-game winning streak.

=== April ===
The Cardinals continued the winning streak in April winning the first 8 games of the month. The winning streak ended at 15 straight following a 3–6 loss to the Baylor Bears in Waco. The Cardinals were ranked #25 in the April 11 Collegiate Baseball poll. The team dropped out of the poll following the loss to Baylor plus two losses to McNeese State. The Cardinals ended the month with a 14–3 record for the month. The cumulative record was 31–10. In conference play, the Cardinals had a 9–3 record for the month and a cumulative record of 16–5.

=== May ===
May saw the Cardinals opening the month with a 5-game losing streak. The team ended the regular season with a 4–7 record and an overall regular season record of 35–17. In conference play, the Cardinals had a 4–5 record for the month with a final conference record of 20–10.

The Cardinals qualified for the 2016 Southland Conference baseball tournament as the 4th seed. The Cardinals were eliminated from the tournament after losing their second game. Including tournament play, the Cardinals finished the 2016 season with a 35–19 overall record.

== Post Season ==
=== Post Season Honors ===
Robin Adames was selected as a Louisville Slugger Freshman All-American.

Reid Russell was named Southland Conference Hitter of the Year. Stijn van de Meer, Will Hibbs, and Reid Russel were named to the first team Southland Conference All-Conference team. Jake Nash was named as a third team SLC All-Conference member. Jacob Middleton and Jimmy Johnson received SLC Honorable Mention honors.

Reid Russell was named to the American Baseball Coaches Association Rawlings South Central All-Region first team.

Reid Russell was one of eight Division I players invited to the 3rd annual College Home Run Derby at TD Ameritrade Park Omaha in Omaha, Nebraska. Russell finished the derby in 3rd place after competing in the semi-final round; missing the final round by one home run.

=== Major League Draft and Free Agents ===
- Major League Draft - Two Cardinals were selected in the Major League Baseball draft. Will Hibbs was a 19th round selection by the Philadelphia Phillies. Stijn van de Meer was selected by the Houston Astros in the 34th round.
- Free Agents - Enrique Oquendo signed a free agent contract with Los Angeles Angels shortly after the MLB draft. Jason McKinley signed a free agent contract with the Tampa Bay Rays on June 20.

== Schedule ==
2016 Lamar Cardinals baseball game log
Regular season
Legend: = Win = Loss = Postponement Bold = Lamar team member

February (6–3)
| Date | Opponent | Site/stadium | Score | Win | Loss | Save | Attendance | Overall record | SLC Record |
|---|---|---|---|---|---|---|---|---|---|
| Feb 19 | Southeast Missouri State* | Vincent–Beck Stadium • Beaumont, TX | **W** 2–1 | **Hibbs, W.** (1–0) | Lucchesi, J. (1–0) | **Oquendo, E.** (1) | 647 | 1–0 | |
| Feb 20 | Southeast Missouri State* | Vincent–Beck Stadium • Beaumont, TX | **W** 2–1 (10) | **Johnson, J.** (1–0) | Murphy, J. (0–1) | None | 659 | 2–0 | |
| Feb 21 | Southeast Missouri State* | Vincent–Beck Stadium • Beaumont, TX | **W** 5–2 | **Martinez, F.** (1–0) | Beltran, R. (0–1) | **Love, B.** (1) | 691 | 3–0 | |
| Feb 22 | #23 Arizona* | Vincent–Beck Stadium • Beaumont, TX | **W** 13–5 | **Andrews, G.** (1–0) | Medel, R. (0–1) | **Moore, T.** (1) | 671 | 4–0 | |
| Feb 24 | #7 LSU* | Vincent–Beck Stadium • Beaumont, TX | **W** 12–11 | **Johnson, J.** (2–0) | Bugg, P. (0–1) | **Oqueno, E.** (2) | 3,563 | 5–0 | |
| Feb 26 | North Dakota State* | Vincent–Beck Stadium • Beaumont, TX | **W** 7–6 | **Johnson, J.** (2–0) | Terres, S. (0–1) | None | 611 | 6–0 | |
| Feb 27 (DH) | North Dakota State* | Vincent–Beck Stadium • Beaumont, TX | **L** 6–7 | Choles, C. (1–0) | **Moore, T.** (0–1) | England, D. (1) | | 6–1 | |
| Feb 27 (DH) | North Dakota State* | Vincent–Beck Stadium • Beaumont, TX | **L** 0–3 | Pfannenstein, R. (1–0) | **Martinez, F.** (0–1) | Harms, J. (1) | 827 | 6–2 | |
| Feb 28 | North Dakota State* | Vincent–Beck Stadium • Beaumont, TX | **L** 5–7 | VanderWoude, B. (2–0) | **Andrews, G.** (1–1) | Terres, S. (2) | 614 | 6–3 | |

March (11–4)
| Date | Opponent | Site/stadium | Score | Win | Loss | Save | Attendance | Overall record | SLC Record |
|---|---|---|---|---|---|---|---|---|---|
| Mar 1 | at Prairie View A&M* | Vincent–Beck Stadium • Beaumont, TX | **W** 13–3 | **Moore, T.** (1–1) | Roblebo, E. (1–2) | None | 502 | 7–3 | |
| Mar 4 | UTRGV* | Vincent–Beck Stadium • Beaumont, TX | **W** 4–1 | **Hibbs, W.** (2–0) | Martinez, Z (0–1) | **Johnson, J.** (1) | 677 | 8–3 | |
| Mar 5 | UTRGV* | Vincent–Beck Stadium • Beaumont, TX | **L** 3–7 | Garcia, A. (1–1) | **Martinez, F.** (1–2) | None | 732 | 8–4 | |
| Mar 6 | UTRGV* | Vincent–Beck Stadium • Beaumont, TX | **W** 4–1 | **Brown, B.** (1–0) | Jackson, R. (0–3) | **Johnson, J.** (2) | 577 | 9–4 | |
| Mar 8 | Rice* | Vincent–Beck Stadium • Beaumont, TX | **Cancelled** | (-) | (-) | | | – | |
| Mar 12 | at Northwestern State | H. Alvin Brown–C. C. Stroud Field • Natchitoches, LA | **L** 0–2 | Oller, A. (2–0) | **Hibbs, W.** (2–1) | None | 612 | 9–5 | 0–1 |
| Mar 13 (DH) | at Northwestern State | H. Alvin Brown–C. C. Stroud Field • Natchitoches, LA | **W** 6–5 | **Johnson, J.** (4–0) | Aultman, N. (1–2) | None | | 10–5 | 1–1 |
| Mar 13 (DH) | at Northwestern State | H. Alvin Brown–C. C. Stroud Field • Natchitoches, LA | **L** 1–5 | Tidwell, E. (2–1) | **Love, B.** (0–1) | None | 582 | 10–6 | 1–2 |
| Mar 15 | #19/20 Houston* | Vincent–Beck Stadium • Beaumont, TX | **L** 3–4 | Kasowksi, M. (2–1) | **Janak, B.** (0–1) | Hernandez, N. (4) | 1,074 | 10–7 | |
| Mar 18 | Central Arkansas | Vincent–Beck Stadium • Beaumont, TX | **W** 19–5 | **Hibbs** (3–1) | Gilmore (1–3) | None | 536 | 11–7 | 2–2 |
| Mar 19 | Central Arkansas | Vincent–Beck Stadium • Beaumont, TX | **W** 7–6 | **Johnson, J.** (5–0) | Murray, J. (0–2) | None | 636 | 12–7 | 3–2 |
| Mar 20 | Central Arkansas | Vincent–Beck Stadium • Beaumont, TX | **W** 9–2 | **McKinley, J.** (1–0) | Gray, T. (1–1) | None | 573 | 13–7 | 4–2 |
| Mar 24 | New Orleans | Vincent–Beck Stadium • Beaumont, TX | **W** 10–7 | **Hobbs, W.** (4–1) | Semple, S. (3–1) | **Johnson, J.** (3) | 605 | 14–7 | 5–2 |
| Mar 25 | New Orleans | Vincent–Beck Stadium • Beaumont, TX | **W** 5–1 | **Love, B.** (1–1) | Hodge, R. (3–1) | None | 716 | 15–7 | 6–2 |
| Mar 26 | New Orleans | Vincent–Beck Stadium • Beaumont, TX | **W** 7–5 | **Oquendo, E.** (1–0) | Martinez, D. (2–1) | None | 718 | 16–7 | 7–2 |
| Mar 29 | Texas* | UFCU Disch–Falk Field • Austin, TX | **W** 4–2 | **Johnson, J.** (6–0) | Mayes, C. (0–3) | **Oquendo, E.** (3) | 4,391 | 17–7 | |

April (14–3)
| Date | Opponent | Site/stadium | Score | Win | Loss | Save | Attendance | Overall record | SLC Record |
|---|---|---|---|---|---|---|---|---|---|
| Apr 2 (DH) | at Abilene Christian* | Crutcher Scott Field • Abilene, TX | **W** 8–5 | **Hibbs, W.** (5–1) | Garrett, D. (2–4) | **Johnson, J.** (4) | | 18–7 | |
| Apr 2 (DH) | at Abilene Christian* | Crutcher Scott Field • Abilene, TX | **W** 16–6 | **Love, B.** (2–1) | Mason, A (3–2) | None | 1,135 | 19–7 | |
| Apr 3 | at Abilene Christian* | Crutcher Scott Field • Abilene, TX | **W** 7–5 | **McKinley, J.** (2–0) | Hanson, D. (1–2) | **Johnson, J.** (5) | 403 | 20–7 | |
| Apr 5 | Nicholls* | Vincent–Beck Stadium • Beaumont, TX | **W** 7–2 | **Moore, T.** (2–1) | Tarver, A. (1–1) | None | 634 | 21–7 | |
| Apr 6 | Nicholls* | Vincent–Beck Stadium • Beaumont, TX | **W** 14–10 | **White, M.** (1–0) | Speer, H. (0–1) | None | 578 | 22–7 | |
| Apr 8 | at Texas A&M–Corpus Christi | Chapman Field • Corpus Christi, TX | **W** 1–0 | **Hibbs, W.** (6–1) | Falwell, C. (1–3) | None | 153 | 23–7 | 8–2 |
| Apr 9 | at Texas A&M–Corpus Christi | Chapman Field • Corpus Christi, TX | **W** 5–1 | **Love, B.** (3–1) | Skapura, D. (2–4) | None | 178 | 24–7 | 9–2 |
| Apr 10 | at Texas A&M–Corpus Christi | Chapman Field • Corpus Christi, TX | **W** 15–12 | **Martinez, F.** (2–2) | Worrel, D. (2–4) | None | 187 | 25–7 | 10–2 |
| Apr 13 | at Baylor* | Baylor Ballpark • Waco, TX | **L** 3–6 | Ott (3–2) | **Johnson, J.** (6–1) | Montemayor (8) | 1,918 | 25–8 | |
| Apr 15 | McNeese State | Vincent–Beck Stadium • Beaumont, TX | **W** 5–1 | **Hibbs, W.** (7–1) | Fontenot, K. (4–3) | None | 1,107 | 26–8 | 11–2 |
| Apr 16 | McNeese State | Vincent–Beck Stadium • Beaumont, TX | **L** 4–5 | King, B. (4–1) | **Love, B.** (3–2) | Kober, C. (6) | 979 | 26–9 | 11–3 |
| Apr 17 | McNeese State | Vincent–Beck Stadium • Beaumont, TX | **L** 0–1 | Stremmel, E. (3–1) | **McKinley, J.** (2–1) | Kober, C. (7) | 722 | 26–10 | 11–4 |
| Apr 20 | Texas Southern* | Vincent–Beck Stadium • Beaumont, TX | **CANCELLED** | (-) | (-) | | | – | |
| Apr 22 | at Houston Baptist | Husky Field • Houston, TX | **W** 3–1 | **Hibbs, W.** (8–1) | Thames, C. (2–4) | Martinez, F. (1) | 317 | 27–10 | 12–4 |
| Apr 23 | at Houston Baptist | Husky Field • Houston, TX | **W** 8–0 | **Love, B.** (4–2) | Russ, A. (6–3) | None | | 28–10 | 13–4 |
| Apr 24 | at Houston Baptist | Husky Field • Houston, TX | **W** 8–6 | **Johnson, J.** (7–1) | Zarosky, D. (2–3) | None | 578 | 29–10 | 14–4 |
| Apr 29 | Incarnate Word | Sullivan Field • San Antonio, TX | **W** 20–6 | **Hibbs, W.** (9–1) | Martinez, B. (1–8) | None | 145 | 30–10 | 15–4 |
| Apr 30 | Incarnate Word | Sullivan Field • San Antonio, TX | **W** 3–1 | **Love, B.** (5–2) | Shull, J. (2–5) | Martinez, F. (2) | 167 | 31–10 | 16–4 |

May (4–7)
| Date | Opponent | Site/stadium | Score | Win | Loss | Save | Attendance | Overall record | SLC Record |
|---|---|---|---|---|---|---|---|---|---|
| May 1 | Incarnate Word | Sullivan Field • San Antonio, TX | **L** 2–3 | Richey, C (2–4) | **Johnson, J.** (7–2) | Moszkowicz, L. (7) | 162 | 31–11 | 16–5 |
| May 4 | at Rice* | Reckling Park • Houston, TX | **L** 2–7 | Esquivel (1–0) | **McKinley, J.** (2–2) | None | 3,782 | 31–12 | |
| May 6 | Southeastern Louisiana | Vincent–Beck Stadium • Beaumont, TX | **L** 6–14 | Cedotal, K. (5–4) | **Hibbs, W.** (9–2) | Green, J. (1) | 741 | 31–13 | 16–6 |
| May 7 | Southeastern Louisiana | Vincent–Beck Stadium • Beaumont, TX | **L** 2–5 | Sceroler, M. (9–2) | **Love, B.** (5–3) | Granier, K. (7) | 643 | 31–14 | 16–7 |
| May 8 | Southeastern Louisiana | Vincent–Beck Stadium • Beaumont, TX | **L** 1–2 | Carlini, D. (6–1) | **Moore, T.** (2–2) | Green, J. (2) | 665 | 31–15 | 16–8 |
| May 13 | Sam Houston State | Vincent–Beck Stadium • Beaumont, TX | **W** 9–8 | **Moore, T.** (3–2) | Manning, M. (4–3) | None | 837 | 32–15 | 17–8 |
| May 14 | Sam Houston State | Vincent–Beck Stadium • Beaumont, TX | **L** 4–9 | Nixon, H (3–2) | **Love, B.** (5–4) | Belton, G. (10) | 1,104 | 32–16 | 17–9 |
| May 15 | Sam Houston State | Vincent–Beck Stadium • Beaumont, TX | **L** 4–7 | Belton, G. (4–1) | **Martinez, F.** (2–3) | Manning, M. (2) | 889 | 32–17 | 17–10 |
| May 19 | at Stephen F. Austin | Jaycees Field • Nacogdoches, TX | **W** 10–9 | **Moore, T.** (4–2) | Starks, T. (3–2) | Martinez, F. (3) | 181 | 33–17 | 18–10 |
| May 20 | at Stephen F. Austin | Jaycees Field • Nacogdoches, TX | **W** 13–6 | **McKinley, J.** (3–2) | Smith, A. (0–1) | None | 228 | 34–17 | 19–10 |
| May 21 | at Stephen F. Austin | Jaycees Field • Nacogdoches, TX | **W** 12–0 | **Love, B.** (6–4) | Greene, J. (4–6) | None | 329 | 35–17 | 20–10 |

Post Season

Southland Conference Tournament
| Date | Opponent | Site/stadium | Score | Win | Loss | Save | Attendance | Overall record |
|---|---|---|---|---|---|---|---|---|
| May 25 | Central Arkansas | Constellation Field • Sugar Land, TX | **L** 0–3 | Davenport, C. (6–2) | **Hibbs, W.** (9–3) | Gray, T. (1) | 1,761 | 35–18 |
| May 26 | Stephen F. Austin | Constellation Field • Sugar Land, TX | **L** 0–3 | Hagey, A. (5–4) | **Love, B.** (4–5) | Starks, T. (6) | | 35–19 |
