= Lamar Cardinals baseball =

Lamar Cardinals
- 2026 Lamar Cardinals baseball team
- Founded: 1952
- University: Lamar University
- Head coach: Sean Allen (1st season)
- Conference: Southland
- Location: Beaumont, Texas
- Home stadium: Vincent–Beck Stadium (capacity: 3,500)
- Nickname: Cardinals
- Colors: Red and white

NCAA tournament appearances
- 1976, 1977, 1979, 1981, 1984, 1985, 1987, 1993, 1995, 2002, 2003, 2004, 2010, 2026

Conference tournament champions
- Sun Belt: 1993, 1995; Southland: 2002, 2004, 2010, 2026

Conference regular season champions
- Southland: 1971, 1975*, 1976, 1977, 1979, 1981, 1984, 1985, 2003, 2004, 2024; *Co-champions; Sun Belt: 1993

The Lamar Cardinals baseball team represents Lamar University and competes in the Southland Conference of the NCAA's Division I after officially rejoining the conference on July 11, 2022. The team is coached by Sean Allen following Will Davis leaving for Houston at the end of the 2026 season. Except for five seasons (1987–1991), the Cardinals baseball team had been coached by Jim Gilligan since 1973. With over 1,300 career wins as a head coach, Gilligan was one of the most winning coaches in NCAA history.

The Cardinals baseball team leads the Southland Conference with 10 regular season titles. The Cardinals also won one Sun Belt Conference regular season title in 1993. In addition, the Cardinals have won three Southland Conference tournament titles and two Sun Belt Conference tournament titles. In the 2010 season, the Lamar was seeded seventh in the Southland Conference baseball tournament, went undefeated through the tournament, and was crowned the conference champions. The team received a bid to the 2010 NCAA Division I baseball tournament and played TCU and Baylor. Over the years, the Cardinals have appeared in the NCAA Division I Baseball Championship tournament thirteen (13) times.

== Coaches ==
=== NCAA Division II ===
==== Lone Star Conference ====
- JB Higgins (1952–1954)

(Baseball was discontinued from 1955–1966.)

=== NCAA Division I ===
==== Southland Conference ====
- Bob Frederick (1967–1968)
- Bill Vincent (1969–1972)
- Jim Gilligan (1973–1986)

==== American South Conference ====
- David Perkins (1988–1991)

==== Sun Belt Conference ====
- Jim Gilligan (1992–1998)

==== Southland Conference ====
- Jim Gilligan (1999–2016)
- Will Davis (2017–2021, 2023–2026)
- Sean Allen (2027– )

==== Western Athletic Conference ====
- Will Davis (2022)

== Lamar career coaching records ==
Coach	Number of Seasons	Overall record	Winning percentage
Coaching Records
J.B. Higgins	3	20–32	.385
Bob Frederick	2	33–20	.622
Bill Vincent	4	59–75–2	.441
Jim Gilligan	14	475–299–6	.614
David Perkins	5	120–152–2	.442
Jim Gilligan	24	878–595–1	.596
Will Davis	8	215–189	.532
Overall	58	1,818–1,375–10	.569

(Records reflect game results through July 25, 2024.)

== Year-by-year results ==
Information Source:

Year-by-Year Results
Year	Coach	Record	Conference Record	Conference	Notes
Played home games at Stuart Stadium
1952	J. B. Higgins	7–5	1–1	Lone Star	
1953	J. B. Higgins	9–13	2–6	Lone Star	
1954	J. B. Higgins	4–14	2–6	Lone Star	
No team from 1955 through 1966.
Played home games at Price Daniel Field
1967	Bob Frederick	14–12	1–2	Southland Conference	
1968	Bob Frederick	19–8	3–2	Southland Conference	
Played home games at Cardinal Field / Vincent–Beck Stadium
1969	Bill Vincent	14–12–1	4–3	Southland Conference	
1970	Bill Vincent	20–17	8–4	Southland Conference	
1971	Bill Vincent	16–21–1	9–3	Southland Conference	SLC Champion
1972	Bill Vincent	9–25	6–12	Southland Conference	
1973	Jim Gilligan	11–15	6–8	Southland Conference	
1974	Jim Gilligan	23–21	9–6	Southland Conference	
1975	Jim Gilligan	27–26	10–5	Southland Conference	SLC Co Champion
1976	Jim Gilligan	35–15	10–5	Southland Conference	SLC Champion, NCAA Regional
1977	Jim Gilligan	37–14–2	13–2	Southland Conference	SLC Champion, NCAA Regional
1978	Jim Gilligan	40–15	14–6	Southland Conference	
1979	Jim Gilligan	44–16–1	15–5	Southland Conference	SLC Champion, NCAA Regional
1980	Jim Gilligan	46–22–3	15–5	Southland Conference	SLC Zone Champion
1981	Jim Gilligan	54–26	12–4	Southland Conference	SLC Champion, NCAA Regional
1982	Jim Gilligan	36–28	13–3	Southland Conference	Forfeited 24 games and SLC title – ineligible player
1983	Jim Gilligan	38–32	9–8	Southland Conference	SLC Zone Champion
1984	Jim Gilligan	45–22	16–2	Southland Conference	SLC Champion, NCAA Regional
1985	Jim Gilligan	35–24	15–2	Southland Conference	SLC Champion, NCAA Regional
1986	Jim Gilligan	33–23	9–6	Southland Conference	
1987	David Perkins	40–19	15–1	Southland Conference	SLC Zone Champion, NCAA Regional
1988	David Perkins	20–31–1	4–11	American South Conference	
1989	David Perkins	26–31	8–7	American South Conference	
1990	David Perkins	16–37–1	3–12	American South Conference	
1991	David Perkins	18–34	6–11	Sun Belt Conference	
1992	Jim Gilligan	32–21	10–9	Sun Belt Conference	NCAA's biggest turnaround of 1992 – 14 game improvement
1993	Jim Gilligan	44–18	13–5	Sun Belt Conference	SBC Champion, SBC Tournament champion, NCAA Regional
1994	Jim Gilligan	36–23	16–8	Sun Belt Conference	SBC West Division Champion (Tie)
1995	Jim Gilligan	38–24	16–11	Sun Belt Conference	SBC Tournament champion, NCAA Regional
1996	Jim Gilligan	26–29	11–16	Sun Belt Conference	
1997	Jim Gilligan	32–19–1	13–11	Sun Belt Conference	
1998	Jim Gilligan	26–27	15–9	Sun Belt Conference	
1999	Jim Gilligan	34–21	12–14	Southland Conference	
2000	Jim Gilligan	27–27	11–16	Southland Conference	
2001	Jim Gilligan	37–24	13–14	Southland Conference	
2002	Jim Gilligan	36–24	16–11	Southland Conference	SLC Tournament champion, NCAA Regional
2003	Jim Gilligan	40–18	20–6	Southland Conference	SLC Champion, SLC Tournament champion, NCAA Regional
2004	Jim Gilligan	41–16	18–8	Southland Conference	SLC Champion, NCAA Regional
2005	Jim Gilligan	38–23	16–11	Southland Conference	
2006	Jim Gilligan	35–23	19–11	Southland Conference	
2007	Jim Gilligan	34–25	20–10	Southland Conference	
2008	Jim Gilligan	35–23	20–10	Southland Conference	
2009	Jim Gilligan	38–22	20–13	Southland Conference	
2010	Jim Gilligan	35–26	16–17	Southland Conference	SLC Tournament champion, NCAA Regional
2011	Jim Gilligan	29–27	15–18	Southland Conference	
2012	Jim Gilligan	22–30	12–13	Southland Conference	
2013	Jim Gilligan	39–20	27–10	Southland Conference	
2014	Jim Gilligan	31–25	20–13	Southland Conference	
2015	Jim Gilligan	21–31	10–19	Southland Conference	
2016	Jim Gilligan	35–19	20–10	Southland Conference	
2017	Will Davis	33–25	16–14	Southland Conference	
2018	Will Davis	19–36	13–17	Southland Conference	
2019	Will Davis	18–36	9–21	Southland Conference	
2020	Will Davis	10–7	0–0	Southland Conference	
2021	Will Davis	25–23	17–19	Southland Conference	
2022	Will Davis	37–21	20–10	WAC	
2023	Will Davis	32–23	13–11	Southland Conference	
2024	Will Davis	44–15	17–7	Southland Conference	SLC regular season champion
2025	Will Davis	–	–	Southland Conference	
	Overall	1,771–1,369–10 (Pct: .564)	742–549–0 (Pct: .575)		

(Records reflect game results through May 25, 2024.)

== Lamar Cardinals in the NCAA tournament ==
- The NCAA Division I baseball tournament started in 1947.
- The format of the tournament has changed through the years.

Year	Record	Pct	Notes
1976	0–2	.000	Arlington, TX Regional; Lost to Texas (2–3), Lost to Miami, FL (0–6)
1977	0–2	.000	Arlington Regional; Lost to Miami, Ohio (0–1), Lost to New Orleans (2–5)
1979	1–2	.333	Austin Regional; Defeated Brigham Young (3–2), Lost to Texas (4–6), Lost to Brigham Young (7–4)
1981	1–2	.333	Austin Regional; Defeated Stanford (6–5), Lost to Texas (2–3), Lost to Stanford (1–9)
1984	2–2	.500	Austin Regional; Lost to Texas (0–6), Defeated Oklahoma (4–3), Defeated UNLV (10–5), Lost to Texas (5–6)
1985	3–2	.600	Austin Regional; Lost to Oklahoma (1–9), Defeated LSU (4–3), Defeated Houston (10–9), Defeated Oklahoma (7–5), Lost to Texas (2–10)
1987	0–2	.000	Austin Regional; Lost to Texas (5–6), Lost to Indiana State (5–10)
1993	0–2	.000	College Station Regional; Lost to UCLA (1–6), Lost to Texas A&M (5–10)
1995	2–2	.500	Wichita Regional; Defeated Wichita State (13–11), Lost to Stanford (1–8), Defeated Wichita State (4–1), Lost to Stanford (9–16)
2002	1–2	.333	Austin Regional; Lost to Baylor (2–4), Defeated Central Conn. St. (9–4), Lost to Baylor (9–10)
2003	3–2	.600	Austin Regional; Defeated Arkansas (3–2), Lost to Texas (3–7), Defeated Arkansas (7–3), Defeated Texas (6–2), Lost to Texas (3–6)
2004	0–2	.000	Houston Regional; Lost to Texas A&M (3–14), Lost to Rice (3–6)
2010	0–2	.000	Fort Worth Regional; Lost to TCU (3–16), Lost to Baylor (4–6)
2026	0–2	.000	College Station Regional; Lost to Texas A&M (5–7), Lost to USC (6–19)
TOTALS	13–28	.317	14 NCAA Division I Tournament Appearances

=== Conference Tournaments ===
Year	Conference	Record	%	Result
1967	Southland	1–2	.333	Semi-finalist
1968	Southland	3–2	.600	Finalist
1989	American South	1–2	.333	
1992	Sun Belt	2–2	.500	Finalist
1993	Sun Belt	4–1	.800	Champions
1994	Sun Belt	4–2	.666	Finalist
1995	Sun Belt	5–1	.8333	Champions
1997	Sun Belt	0–2	.000	
1998	Sun Belt	1–2	.333	3rd Round
2001	Southland	3–2	.600	Finalist
2002	Southland	4–0	1.000	Champions
2003	Southland	0–2	.000	
2004	Southland	4–0	1.000	Champions
2005	Southland	3–2	.600	Finalist
2006	Southland	2–2	.500	Semi-finalist
2007	Southland	1–2	.333	3rd Round
2008	Southland	3–2	.600	Finalist
2009	Southland	2–2	.500	Semi-finalist
2010	Southland	4–0	1.000	Champions
2011	Southland	0–2	.000	
2013	Southland	3–2	.600	Semi-finalist
2014	Southland	0–2	.000	
2016	Southland	0–2	.000	
2017	Southland	0-2	.000	
2021	Southland	0-2	.000	
2022	WAC	1-2	.333	
2023	Southland	0-2	.000	
2024	Southland	3-2	.600	Semi-finalist
Total	Western Athletic Conference	1–2	.333	1 Appearance
Total	Southland	36–34	.514	20 Appearances
Total	American South	1–2	.333	1 Appearance
Total	Sun Belt	16–10	.615	6 Appearances
Total	Overall	51–46	.526	27 Appearances

== Major League Baseball ==
=== Players in the majors ===
Several Lamar players have gone on to play in Major League Baseball.

- Beau Allred
- Bruce Aven
- Eric Cammack
- Jerald Clark
- Clay Hensley
- Micah Hoffpauir
- Tony Mack
- Kevin Millar
- Brian Sanches
- Dave Smith
- Randy Williams

=== Players drafted by major league teams ===
Lamar has had 86 players selected in the Major League Baseball draft since it began in 1965.

Lamar Cardinals in the Major League Baseball Draft
Year	Player	Round	Team
1969	Edward Rundle	4	Padres
1970	Kenneth Wamble	5	Braves
1973	Michael Hughes	22	Tigers
1975	Julio Alonso	23	Tigers
1977	Richard Nesloney	23	Red Sox
1979	Dave Smith	27	Mets
1980	Rico Sutton	3	Blue Jays
1981	Lewis Surratt	13	Rangers
1981	Jeffrey Kennedy	17	Angels
1982	Tony Mack	3	Angels
1982	Kim Christensen	15	White Sox
1982	Joe Pantaleo	16	Cubs
1983	Byron Kimmerling	1	Angels
1984	Keith Silver	4	Giants
1984	Jerald Clark	23	Dodgers
1984	Christopher Zink	27	Yankees
1984	Jay Burton	44	Yankees
1985	Gary Nalls	1	Angels
1985	Jerald Clark	12	Padres
1987	Mike Wilkins	17	Tigers
1987	Beau Allred	25	Indians
1987	James Terrill	25	Giants
1992	Mike Weglarz	30	Royals
1993	Phil Brassington	5	Royals
1994	Bruce Aven	30	Indians
1994	Anthony Iapoce	33	Brewers
1995	Mike Pasqualicchio	2	Brewers
1995	Eric Mapp	19	Reds
1995	Robert Rauch	29	Red Sox
1996	Morgan Walker	2	Pirates
1997	Jack Joffrion	8	Rays
1997	Randy Williams	12	Cubs
1997	Eric Cammack	13	Mets
1997	Aaron Dean	27	Dodgers
1999	Brian Sanchez	2	Royals
1999	Joe Sergent	21	Marlins
1999	Cortney Jenkins	22	Devil Rays
1999	Todd Meyers	43	Diamondbacks
2000	Heath Totten	5	Dodgers
2000	B.J. Littleton	7	Orioles
2002	Thomas Atlee	19	Cubs
2002	Clay Hensley	8	Giants
2002	Micah Hoffpauir	13	Cubs
2002	Thomas Atlee	19	Cubs
2003	Mark Ion	15	Rockies
2003	Josh Gray	30	Twins
2003	David Talamantez	33	Reds
2004	Chris Buechner	11	Rockies
2004	Jon Hunton	11	Cubs
2004	Ben Cox	19	Expos
2004	Kyle Stutes	22	Padres
2004	Ryan Finan	22	Orioles
2004	Jordan Foster	24	Tigers
2004	Josh Harris	42	Twins
2005	Scott Vander Weg	33	Cubs
2006	Steve MacFarland	9	Pirates
2006	William Delage	14	Indians
2006	Michael Ambort	18	Athletics
2006	Charles Platt	23	Cubs
2006	Derrick Gordon	26	Athletics
2006	C.J. Ebarb	41	Blue Jays
2007	Colin DeLome	5	Astros
2007	Michael Ambort	6	Giants
2007	Erik Kanaby	10	Dodgers
2007	Allen Harrington	13	Padres
2007	Scott Meyer	24	Cubs
2008	Timothy Erickson	37	Mets
2008	Justin Walker	41	Reds
2009	Ricky Testa	18	Rockies
2009	James Brandhorst	20	Orioles
2009	Brian Needham	28	Mets
2009	Kevin Angelle	32	Phillies
2011	Steven Tromblee	35	Angels
2011	Blake Ford	44	Astros
2012	Jonathan Dziedzic	37	Red Sox
2013	Jonathan Dziedzic	13	Royals
2013	Darian Johnson	32	Red Sox
2014	Sam Bumpers	22	Rockies
2014	J.T. Autrey	32	Blue Jays
2014	David Carver	35	Brewers
2015	Collin Chapman	33	Rays
2016	Will Hibbs	19	Phillies
2016	Stijn van der Meer	34	Astros
2017	Carson Lance	16	Tigers
2017	Bryndon Arredondo	23	Orioles
2017	Jimmy Johnson	25	Diamondbacks
2017	Reid Russell	33	Astros
2018	Tanner Driscoll	9	Nationals
2019	Jason Blanchard	9	Padres
2019	JC Correa	38	Astros

== See also ==
- List of NCAA Division I baseball programs
