= 2013 Southland Conference baseball tournament =

- Teams: 8
- Format: Double-elimination
- Finals site: Constellation Field; Sugar Land, TX
- Champions: Central Arkansas (1st title)
- Winning coach: Allen Gum (1st title)
- MVP: Forrestt Allday (Central Arkansas)

2013 Southland Conference baseball standings
	Conf.				Overall
Team	W		L	PCT	W		L	PCT
Sam Houston State ‍†‍‍^{y}	20	–	7	.741	38	–	22	.633
Texas A&M–Corpus Christi ‍‍‍	17	–	10	.630	33	–	24	.579
Southeastern Louisiana ‍‍‍	16	–	11	.593	36	–	24	.600
Oral Roberts ‍‍‍	16	–	11	.593	25	–	32	.439
Lamar ‍‍‍	15	–	12	.556	39	–	20	.661
Stephen F. Austin ‍‍‍	15	–	12	.556	28	–	29	.491
No. 25 Central Arkansas ‍‍‡‍^{y}	12	–	15	.444	42	–	22	.656
McNeese State ‍‍‍	10	–	17	.370	23	–	31	.426
Nicholls State ‍‍‍	9	–	18	.333	26	–	29	.473
Northwestern State ‍‍‍	5	–	22	.185	16	–	40	.286
† – Conference champion ‡ – Tournament champion y – Invited to the NCAA tournament As of June 30, 2013; Rankings from Collegiate Baseball

The 2013 Southland Conference baseball tournament was held from May 22 through 25. The top eight regular season finishers of the league's ten teams will meet in the double-elimination tournament, which was held at Constellation Field in Sugar Land, Texas. The event returned to a neutral site after two seasons on campus. In the championship game, seventh-seeded Central Arkansas defeated fourth-seeded Southeastern Louisiana, 4-0, to win its first tournament championship. As a result, Central Arkansas earned the conference's automatic bid to the 2013 NCAA Division I baseball tournament.

== Seeding and format ==
The top eight finishers from the regular season were seeded one through eight. They played a two bracket, double-elimination tournament, with the winner of each bracket meeting in a single championship final.

Team	W	L	Pct.	GB	Seed
Sam Houston State	20	7	.741	–	1
Texas A&M–Corpus Christi	17	10	.630	3	2
Oral Roberts	16	11	.593	4	3
Southeastern Louisiana	16	11	.593	4	4
Lamar	15	12	.556	5	5
Stephen F. Austin	15	12	.556	5	6
Central Arkansas	12	15	.444	8	7
McNeese State	10	17	.370	10	8
Nicholls State	9	18	.333	11	–
Northwestern State	5	22	.185	15	–

== Results ==
First round
1	Sam Houston State	8
8	McNeese State	3
4	Southeastern Louisiana	5
5	Lamar	3
5	Lamar	10
8	McNeese State	3
3	Oral Roberts	4
6	Stephen F. Austin	2
2	Texas A&M–Corpus Christi	5
7	Central Arkansas	3
6	Stephen F. Austin	3
7	Central Arkansas	7

Second round
1	Sam Houston State	3
4	Southeastern Louisiana	5
1	Sam Houston State	1
5	Lamar	3
3	Oral Roberts	6
2	Texas A&M-Corpus Christi	1
2	Texas A&M- Corpus Christi	1
7	Central Arkansas	8

Semifinals
4	Southeastern Louisiana	2	7
5	Lamar	12	2
3	Oral Roberts	5	3
7	Central Arkansas	6	11

Final
4	Southeastern Louisiana	0
7	Central Arkansas	4

== All-Tournament Team ==
The following players were named to the All-Tournament Team.

Pos.	Name	School
C	Michael Marietta	Central Arkansas
1B	Jameson Fisher	Southeastern Louisiana
2B	V.J. Bunner	Lamar
SS	Sam Bumpers	Lamar
3B	Garrett Brown	Central Arkansas
OF	Forrestt Allday	Central Arkansas
OF	Logan Domenico	Oral Roberts
OF	Ladd Rhodes	Southeastern Louisiana
DH	Seth Dornak	Lamar
P	Jonathan Dziedzic	Lamar
P	Connor Gilmore	Central Arkansas

=== Most Valuable Player ===
Central Arkansas outfielder Forrestt Allday was named the tournament's Most Valuable Player.

== See also ==
- 2013 Southland Conference softball tournament
