= 2016 Southland Conference baseball tournament =

- Teams: 8
- Format: Double-elimination
- Finals site: Constellation Field; Sugar Land, Texas
- Champions: Sam Houston State (5th title)
- Winning coach: Matt Deggs (1st title)
- MVP: Heath Donica (Sam Houston State)
- Television: ESPN3

2016 Southland Conference baseball standings
	Conf.				Overall
Team	W		L	PCT	W		L	PCT
Sam Houston State ‍†‍‡‍^{y}	24	–	6	.800	42	–	22	.656
Southeastern Louisiana ‍‍‍^{y}	22	–	8	.733	40	–	21	.656
Lamar ‍‍‍	20	–	10	.667	35	–	19	.648
Northwestern State ‍‍‍	20	–	10	.667	33	–	24	.579
Central Arkansas ‍‍‍	16	–	14	.533	29	–	27	.518
McNeese State ‍‍‍	15	–	15	.500	31	–	25	.554
New Orleans ‍‍‍	14	–	16	.467	31	–	26	.544
Stephen F. Austin ‍‍‍	14	–	16	.467	30	–	30	.500
Nicholls State ‍‍‍	14	–	16	.467	26	–	30	.464
Houston Baptist ‍‍‍	12	–	18	.400	24	–	29	.453
Texas A&M-Corpus Christi ‍‍‍	8	–	20	.286	19	–	32	.373
Abilene Christian * ‍‍‍	8	–	21	.276	16	–	37	.302
Incarnate Word * ‍‍‍	5	–	22	.185	13	–	38	.255
† – Conference champion ‡ – Tournament champion y – Invited to the NCAA tournament * Ineligible for league and NCAA tournaments due to transition from Division II; As of June 11, 2016; Rankings from Collegiate Baseball

The 2016 Southland Conference baseball tournament was held from May 25 through 28. The top eight regular season finishers of the league's ten teams met in the double-elimination tournament to be held at Constellation Field in Sugar Land, Texas. Sam Houston State won their fifth Tournament championship and earned the conference's automatic bid to the 2016 NCAA Division I baseball tournament. Abilene Christian and Incarnate Word were ineligible for postseason play as they transition from Division II.

== Seeding and format ==
The top eight finishers from the regular season, not including Abilene Christian or Incarnate Word, will be seeded one through eight. They will play a two bracket, double-elimination tournament, with the winner of each bracket meeting in a single championship final.

Every game of the tournament will be broadcast exclusively on ESPN3.

Team	W	L	Pct	GB	Seed
Sam Houston State	24	6	.800	—	1
Southeastern Louisiana	22	8	.733	2	2
Northwestern State	20	10	.667	4	3
Lamar	20	10	.667	4	4
Central Arkansas	16	14	.533	8	5
McNeese State	15	15	.500	9	6
New Orleans	14	16	.467	10	7
Stephen F. Austin	14	16	.467	10	8
Nicholls State	14	16	.467	10	—
Houston Baptist	12	18	.400	12	—
Texas A&M-Corpus Christi	8	20	.286	15	—
Abilene Christian	8	21	.276	15.5	—
Incarnate Word	5	22	.185	17.5	—

== Results ==
First round
1	Sam Houston State	5
8	Stephen F. Austin	3
4	Lamar	0
5	Central Arkansas	3
8	Stephen F. Austin	5
4	Lamar	2
3	Northwestern State	0
6	McNeese State	3
2	Southeastern Louisiana	5
7	New Orleans	4
3	Northwestern State	5
7	New Orleans	6

Second round
1	Sam Houston State	12
5	Central Arkansas	2
5	Central Arkansas	4
8	Stephen F. Austin	10
6	McNeese State	0
2	Southeastern Louisiana	10
6	McNeese State	8^{13}
7	New Orleans	4

Semifinals
1	Sam Houston State	0	8
8	Stephen F. Austin	1	2
2	Southeastern Louisiana	4	—
6	McNeese State	1	—

Final
1	Sam Houston State	7
2	Southeastern Louisiana	4

== All-Tournament Team ==
The following players were named to the All-Tournament Team.

Name	School
Webb Bobo	Southeastern Louisiana
Carson Crites	Southeastern Louisiana
Conner Fikes	Stephen F. Austin
Jameson Fisher	Southeastern Louisiana
Kaleb Fontenot	McNeese State
Lance Miles	Sam Houston State
Nick Ramos	Stephen F. Austin
Robie Rojas	Sam Houston State
Mac Scerole	Southeastern Louisiana
Jacob Seward	Southeastern Louisiana
Zach Smith	Sam Houston State

=== Most Valuable Player ===
Heath Donica was named Tournament Most Valuable Player. Donica was a junior pitcher for Sam Houston State.
