= Jonathan Dziedzic =

American professional baseball pitcher

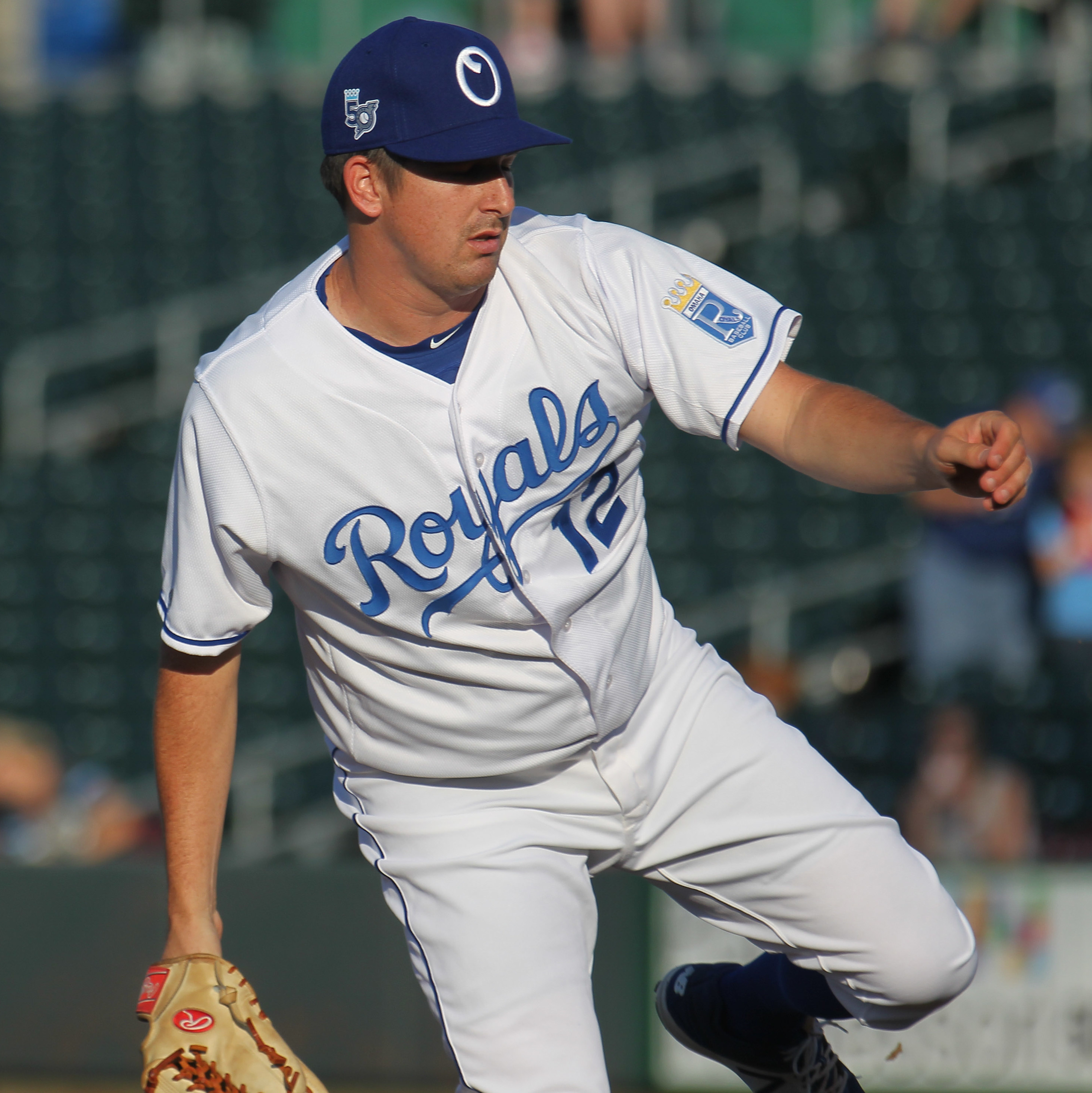
- Dziedzic with the Omaha Storm Chasers in 2018

Free agent
- Pitcher
- Born: February 4, 1991 (age 35); Houston, Texas, U.S.
- Bats: Right Throws: Left
- Stats at Baseball Reference

Jonathan Michael Dziedzic (/ˈdʒɛdʒɪk/; born February 4, 1991) is an American professional baseball pitcher who is a free agent.

== Career ==
Dziedzic attended Atascocita High School in Humble, Texas, and Lamar University in Beaumont, Texas. He played college baseball for the Lamar Cardinals. The Boston Red Sox selected Dziedzic in the 37th round, with the 1,141st overall selection, of the 2012 MLB draft. He did not sign, returning to Lamar University. After the 2012 season, he played collegiate summer baseball with the Falmouth Commodores of the Cape Cod Baseball League.

The Kansas City Royals selected Dziedzic in the 13th round, with the 381st overall selection, of the 2013 MLB draft. He signed and spent 2013 with the Idaho Falls Chukars where he was 2–0 with a 2.68 ERA in 12 games (11 starts). He spent 2014 with the Wilmington Blue Rocks, compiling a 6–7 record and 2.52 ERA in 24 starts, and 2015 with the Northwest Arkansas Naturals, posting a 10–6 record and 3.12 ERA in 26 games (25 starts), along with pitching one game for the Omaha Storm Chasers. In 2016, Dziedzic played for Omaha, collecting a 5–10 record, 4.05 ERA, and 1.41 WHIP in 26 games, with 25 being starts, and in 2017, he returned to Omaha, starting nine games and pitching to a 3–3 record and 4.73 ERA before his season was ended due to injury.

Dziedzic made 25 appearances for Omaha in 2019, compiling a 5.25 ERA with 35 strikeouts across 58 1/3 innings pitched. He elected free agency following the season on November 4, 2019.
