= Jim Gilligan =

American baseball player and coach

Biographical details
- Born: October 1, 1946 (age 80); Bayside, New York, U.S.

Coaching career (HC unless noted)
- 1972: Western New Mexico
- 1973–1986: Lamar
- 1987: Salt Lake City Trappers
- 1992–2016: Lamar

Head coaching record
- Overall: 1,320–876–6 (.601)

Accomplishments and honors

Awards
- Texas Baseball Hall of Fame; Southland Conference Coach of the Year; 1976, 1977, 2002, 2003, 2004; Sun Belt Conference Coach of the Year; 1993

Jim Gilligan (born October 1, 1946) is an American former head baseball coach, primarily for the Lamar Cardinals baseball program.

In his 38 seasons as head coach, Gilligan has guided Lamar's baseball team to 11 conference championships, 13 NCAA regional appearances, and five conference titles. He has been named the Southland Conference coach of the year six times during his career and is the 32nd coach in NCAA history to record 1,000 career wins. Gilligan is an alumnus of Lamar University, having earned a bachelor's degree in 1969 and a master's in 1970.

In between his years at Lamar, Gilligan coached for professional baseball teams. The Gilligan managed 1987 Salt Lake City Trappers broke a 68-year-old record for consecutive wins. The team ended with 29 consecutive wins. The achievement is recognized in the Baseball Hall of Fame in Cooperstown, NY. Gilligan's Number 29 jersey is part of a display at the hall of fame.

== Recognition and awards ==
In 2007, Lamar baseball fans and Cardinal Club members started the fund for the Gilligan Scholarship in honor of the coach. Donors said they hope the scholarship continues to grow and leave a permanent legacy in honor of Gilligan. The scholarship will assist members of Lamar's baseball team in attending Lamar.

On June 29, 2010, the Beaumont City Council voted unanimously to rename a section of East Florida Avenue to Jim Gilligan Way. They cited his excellence on and off the field for bestowing this honor.

Coach Gilligan ranks fifth among the NCAA's active coaches in career victories with 1,307, with 1,297 of those being at Lamar. His first 10 came in one season at Western New Mexico. Gilligan achieved his 1,300th career win against the New Mexico State Aggies on February 13, 2015.

In 2004, Gilligan was inducted into the Texas Baseball Hall of Fame.

Gilligan has been named Southland Conference Coach of the Year five times and Sun Belt Conference Coach of the Year once.

== Head coaching records ==
The following is a table of Gilligan's yearly records as an NCAA head baseball coach.

Record table
Season	Team	Overall	Conference	Standing	Postseason
Western New Mexico Mustangs (Division II) (1972)
1972	Western New Mexico	10–10			
Western New Mexico:		10–10			
Lamar Cardinals (Southland Conference) (1973–1986)
1973	Lamar	11–15	6–12	5th	
1974	Lamar	23–21	9–6	3rd	
1975	Lamar	27–26	10–5	t-1st	
1976	Lamar	35–15	10–5	1st	NCAA Regional
1977	Lamar	37–14–2	13–2	1st	NCAA Regional
1978	Lamar	40–15	14–6	2nd	
1979	Lamar	44–16–1	15–5	1st	NCAA Regional
1980	Lamar	46–22–2	15–5	1st (South)	Southland Championship Series
1981	Lamar	54–26	12–4	1st (South)	NCAA Regional
1982	Lamar	36–28	13–3	1st (South)	Southland Championship Series
1983	Lamar	38–32	9–8	1st (West)	Southland Championship Series
1984	Lamar	45–22	16–2	1st	NCAA Regional
1985	Lamar	35–24	15–2	1st	NCAA Regional
1986	Lamar	33–23	9–6	3rd	
Lamar Cardinals (Sun Belt Conference) (1992–1998)
1992	Lamar	31–22	10–9	3rd (West)	Sun Belt Tournament
1993	Lamar	44–18	13–5	1st (West)	NCAA Regional
1994	Lamar	36–23	16–8	t-1st (West)	Sun Belt Tournament
1995	Lamar	38–24	16–11	4th	NCAA Regional
1996	Lamar	26–29	11–16	7th	
1997	Lamar	32–19–1	13–11	5th	Sun Belt Tournament
1998	Lamar	26–27	15–9	3rd	Sun Belt Tournament
Lamar Cardinals (Southland Conference) (1999–2016)
1999	Lamar	34–21	12–14	7th	
2000	Lamar	27–27	11–16	7th	
2001	Lamar	37–24	13–14	6th	Southland Tournament
2002	Lamar	36–24	16–11	3rd	NCAA Regional
2003	Lamar	40–18	20–6	1st	NCAA Regional
2004	Lamar	41–16	18–8	1st	NCAA Regional
2005	Lamar	38–23	16–11	2nd	Southland Tournament
2006	Lamar	35–23	19–11	4th	Southland Tournament
2007	Lamar	34–25	20–10	1st (East)	Southland Tournament
2008	Lamar	35–23	20–10	1st (East)	Southland Tournament
2009	Lamar	38–22	20–13	4th	Southland Tournament
2010	Lamar	35–26	16–17	t-6th	NCAA Regional
2011	Lamar	29–27	15–18	7th	Southland Tournament
2012	Lamar	22–30	14–19	t-8th	
2013	Lamar	39–20	15–12	t-5th	Southland tournament
2014	Lamar	31–25	16–14	8th	Southland tournament
2015	Lamar	21–31	10–19	12th	
2016	Lamar	35–19	20–10	3rd	Southland tournament
Lamar:		1345-885-6 (.602)	551–364 (.600)		
Total:		1355-895-6 (.601)			
National champion Postseason invitational champion Conference regular season champion Conference regular season and conference tournament champion Division regular season champion Division regular season and conference tournament champion Conference tournament champion

== See also ==
- List of college baseball career coaching wins leaders
