= 2025 Incarnate Word Cardinals baseball team =

American college baseball season

2025 Incarnate Word Cardinals baseball
- Conference: Southland Conference
- Record: 17–33 (3–27 Southland)
- Head coach: Ryan Shotzberger (6th season)
- Assistant coaches: Greg Evans; Steve Hecker; Taylor Featherston
- Home stadium: Sullivan Field

2025 Southland Conference baseball standings
	Conf.				Overall
Team	W		L	PCT	W		L	PCT
Southeastern Louisiana ‍†‍‍	22	–	8	.733	38	–	16	.704
UT Rio Grande Valley ‍†‍‍	22	–	8	.733	36	–	18	.667
Lamar ‍‍‍	20	–	10	.667	40	–	17	.702
McNeese ‍‍‍	19	–	11	.633	31	–	17	.646
Northwestern State ‍‍‍	19	–	11	.633	35	–	21	.625
Houston Christian ‍‍‡‍^{y}	17	–	13	.567	32	–	25	.561
New Orleans ‍‍‍	12	–	18	.400	28	–	26	.519
Texas A&M–Corpus Christi ‍‍‍	12	–	18	.400	21	–	31	.404
Nicholls ‍‍‍	10	–	20	.333	17	–	32	.347
Stephen F. Austin ‍‍‍	9	–	21	.300	18	–	31	.367
Incarnate Word ‍‍‍	3	–	27	.100	17	–	33	.340
† – Conference champion ‡ – Tournament champion y – Invited to the NCAA Tournament; As of May 31, 2025; Rankings from D1Baseball

The 2025 Incarnate Word Cardinals baseball team represented the University of the Incarnate Word during the 2025 NCAA Division I baseball season. The Cardinals played their home games at Sullivan Field and were led by sixth–year head coach Ryan Shotzberger. They are members of the Southland Conference. The Cardinals compiled a 17–33 overall record and a 3–27 record in conference play for an eleventh-place finish. They failed to qualify for the SLC conference tournament.

== Preseason ==
=== Southland Conference Coaches Poll ===
The Southland Conference Coaches Poll was released on February 6, 2025. Incarnate Word was picked to finish seventh in the Southland Conference with 95 overall votes.

Coaches poll
Predicted finish	Team	Votes (1st place)
1	Lamar	197 (18)
2	Southeastern Louisiana	146 (4)
3	McNeese	145
4	UT Rio Grande Valley	144
5	Nicholls	129
6	New Orleans	128
7	Incarnate Word	95
8	Northwestern State	89
9	Texas A&M–Corpus Christi	73
10	Houston Christian	37
11	Stephen F. Austin	27

=== Preseason All-Southland team ===
Rey Mendoza and Josh Salinas were named to the conference preseason first team. No Cardinals were named to the conference preseason second team.

==== First Team ====
- Zak Skinner* (LU, JR, Catcher)
- Brayden Evans* (LU, JR, 1st Base)
- Isaac Webb* (TAMU, SR, 2nd Base)
- TJ Salvaggio (SELU, SR, Shortstop)
- Rocco Gump (NWST, SR, 3rd Base)
- Reese Lipoma* (NWST, RSR, Outfielder)
- Connor Westenburg (McN, SR, Outfielder)
- Cole Stromboe+ (SELU, RSR, Outfielder)
- Tristian Moore+ (UNO, RSR, Outfielder)
- Bryce Calloway* (UNO, SR, Utility)
- Rey Mendoza (UIW, GR, Designated Hitter)
- Brennan Stuprich* (SELU, RSR, Starting Pitcher)
- Josh Salinas (UIW, GR, Starting Pitcher)
- Zach Garcia (TAMU, SR, Starting Pitcher)
- Kyle Moseley (LU, SR, Relief Pitcher)

*-2024 Southland All-Conference Selection
+-Tie for final spot

==== Second Team ====
- Steven Lancia (UTRGV, SR, Catcher)
- Martin Vazquez (UTRGV, SR, 1st Base)
- Diego Villsecas* (UNO, SR, 2nd Base)
- Isaac Lopez (UTRGV, GR, Shortstop)
- Easton Moomau+ (UTRGV, SO, 3rd Base)
- Matt Ryan+ (LU, SR, 3rd Base)
- Balin Valentine (NWST, SR, Outfielder)
- Parker Coley (SELU, SR, Outfielder)
- Jude Hall (SELU, SR, Outfielder)
- Simon Larranaga (MCN, SR, Utility)
- Armani Raygoza (UTRGV, RSO, Designated Hitter)
- Parker Edwards (HCU, SR, Starting Pitcher)
- Angelo Cabral (UTRGV, GR, Starting Pitcher)
- Tyler Bryan (NWST, JR, Starting Pitcher)
- Larson Fabre (SELU, JR, Relief Pitcher)

*-2024 Southland All-Conference Selection
+-Tie for final spot

== Schedule and results ==
Legend
	Incarnate Word win
	Incarnate Word loss
	Postponement/Cancelation/Suspensions
**Bold**	Incarnate Word team member
*	Non-Conference game

2025 Incarnate Word Cardinals baseball game log (17–33)
Regular season (17–33)

February (7–3)
Date	Opponent	Rank	Site/stadium Site	Score	Win	Loss	Save	TV	Attendance	Overall record	SLC Record
Feb. 14	Saint Peter's University*		Sullivan Field • San Antonio, TX	12–2; 8 inn	**Salinas, Josh (1-0)**	Yash Jain (0-1)	**Pilot, Braelin (1)**	ESPN+	126	1–0	
Feb. 15	Saint Peter's University*		Sullivan Field • San Antonio, TX	16–6^{7}	**Garcia, EJ (1-0)**	David Delgadillo (0-1)	None	ESPN+	224	2–0	
Feb. 16	Saint Peter's University*		Sullivan Field • San Antonio, TX	16–11	**Schlotzhauer, Ryan (1-0)**	Michael DiForte (0-1)	**Hargett, Hunter (1)**	ESPN+	264	3–0	
Feb. 17	Saint Peter's University*		Sullivan Field • San Antonio, TX	5–8	Lance Mittelman (1-0)	**Byrd, Adam (0-1)**	Ben Williams (1)	ESPN+	156	3–1	
Feb. 18	Abilene Christian*		Sullivan Field • San Antonio, TX	11–7	**Garcia, EJ (2-0)**	Huspen, C. (0-1)	None	ESPN+	123	4–1	
Feb. 21	Texas Southern*		Sullivan Field • San Antonio, TX	18–1^{7}	**Salinas, Josh (2-0)**	Joshua Prieto (0-1)	None	ESPN+	104	5–1	
Feb. 22	Texas Southern*		Sullivan Field • San Antonio, TX	8–4	**Elizondo, Jackson (1-0)**	Leeroy Tavarez (1-1)	None	ESPN+	117	6–1	
Feb. 23	Texas Southern*		Sullivan Field • San Antonio, TX	14–10	**Hargett, Hunter (1-0)**	Kewan Braziel (0-2)	None	ESPN+	218	7–1	
Feb. 25	#15 Texas*		UFCU Disch–Falk Field • Austin, TX	6–0	Jason Flores (1-0)	**Garcia, EJ (2-1)**	None	ESPN+	6,964	7–2	
Feb. 28	Houston Christian		Sullivan Field • San Antonio, TX	10–14	Castano, Louis (1-0)	**Salinas, Josh (2-1)**	None	ESPN+	184	7–3	0–1

March (6–14)
Date	Opponent	Rank	Site/stadium	Score	Win	Loss	Save	TV	Attendance	Overall record	SLC Record
Mar 1	Houston Christian		Sullivan Field • San Antonio, TX	5–10	Caravalho, Joshua (3-0)	**Elizondo, Jackson (1-1)**	None	ESPN+		7–4	0–2
Mar 2	Houston Christian		Sullivan Field • San Antonio, TX	7–9	Feltman, Jett (1-1)	**Hargett, Hunter (1-1)**	Norton, Ben (1)	ESPN+	268	7–5	0–3
Mar 4	Texas State*		Sullivan Field • San Antonio, TX	7–6	**Posey, Jonah (1-0)**	Dudley, Bryson (3-1)	None	ESPN+	254	8–5	
Mar 5	at Grambling*		Wilbert Ellis Field at Ralph Waldo Emerson Jones Park • Grambling, LA				**Cancelled**				
Mar 7	at Northwestern State		H. Alvin Brown–C. C. Stroud Field • Natchitoches, LA	4–5	Leonard, Bryce (1-1)	**Pillot, Braelin (0-1)**	None	ESPN+	505	8–6	0–4
Mar 8	at Northwestern State		H. Alvin Brown–C. C. Stroud Field • Natchitoches, LA	4–12	Bryan, Tyler (1-1)	**Garcia, EJ (2-2)**	None	ESPN+	387	8–7	0–5
Mar 9	at Northwestern State		H. Alvin Brown–C. C. Stroud Field • Natchitoches, LA	4–5	Hillen, Trent (2-1)	**Elizondo, Jackson (1-2)**	None	ESPN+		8–8	0–6
Mar 11	at UTSA*		Roadrunner Field • San Antonio, TX]	8–5	**McKay, Gus (1-0))**	James Hubbard (1-2)	None		873	9–8	
Mar 12	at Tarleton State*		Cecil Ballow Baseball Complex • Stephenville, TX	3–18^{7}	Carter, Brendon (1-0)	**Smith, Luke (0-1)**	None		243	9–9	
Mar 14	New Orleans		Sullivan Field • San Antonio, TX	9–18	Torrez, Aiden (1-1)	**Salinas, Josh (2-2)**	Toney, Sawyer (1)	ESPN+	182	9–10	0–7
Mar 15	New Orleans		Sullivan Field • San Antonio, TX	7–10	Jones, Skylar (3-0)	**Elizondo, Jackson (2-3)**	Calloway, Bryce (4)	ESPN+	218	9–11	0–8
Mar 16	New Orleans		Sullivan Field • San Antonio, TX	6–12	Bienvenu, Matthew (1-1)	**McKay, Gus (1-1)**	None	ESPN+	178	9–12	0–9
Mar 18	at Rice*		Reckling Park • Houston, TX	4–2	**Robles, Bruno (1-0)**	Jackson Blank (0-2)	**Pillot, Braelin (2)**	ESPN+	1,474	10–12	
Mar 19	at Southern*		Lee–Hines Field • Baton Rouge, LA	19–11	**Garcia, EJ (3-2)**	Genesis Prosper (0-2)		None	378	11–12	
Mar 21	at Nicholls		Ben Meyer Diamond at Ray E. Didier Field • Thibodaux, LA	1–7	Parache, Nuno (1-0)	**Salinas, Josh (2-3)**		None	504	11–13	0–10
Mar 22	at Nicholls		Ben Meyer Diamond at Ray E. Didier Field • Thibodaux, LA	0–10^{7}	Sparks, Alec (4-1)	**McKay, Gus (1-2)**	None		613	11–14	0–11
Mar 23	at Nicholls		Ben Meyer Diamond at Ray E. Didier Field • Thibodaux, LA	4–3	**Elizondo, Jackson (3-3)**	McGibboney, Luke (0-1)	Pillot, Braelin (3)		501	12–14	1–11
Mar 25	at Prairie View A&M*		John W. Tankersley Field • Prairie View, TX	8–7	**Esparza, Trevor (1-0)**	Marcus McMillan (0-1)	**Byrd, Adam (1)**	YouTube	98	13–14	
Mar 26	at Texas State*		Bobcat Baseball Stadium • San Marcos, TX				**Cancelled due to inclement weather. Game will not be made up.**				
Mar 28	Lamar		Sullivan Field • San Antonio, TX	5–8^{10}	Ramirez, Fabian (2-0)	**Schlotzhauer, Ryan (1-1)**	None	ESPN+	142	13–15	1–12
Mar 29	Lamar		Sullivan Field • San Antonio, TX	6–8	Sutton, Carter (4-0)	**McKay, Gus (1-3)**	Krkovski, Luke (1)		378	13–16	1–13
Mar 30	Lamar		Sullivan Field • San Antonio, TX	6–17^{7}	Olivier, Chris (4-1)	**Bush, Jordan (0-1)**	None	ESPN+	202	13–17	1–14

April (4–10)
Date	Opponent	Rank	Site/stadium	Score	Win	Loss	Save	TV	Attendance	Overall record	SLC Record
Apr 1	Texas A&M*		Olsen Field at Blue Bell Park • College Station, TX	1–21	Lyons, Gavin (2-0)	**Garcia, EJ (2-3)**	None	SECN+	4,373	13–18	
Apr 4	at Southeastern Louisiana		Pat Kenelly Diamond at Alumni Field • Hammond, LA	4–2	**McKay, Gus (2-3)**	Stuprich, Brennan (6-2)	**Posey, Jonah (1)**	ESPN+	1,379	14–18	2–14
Apr 5	Southeastern Louisiana		Pat Kenelly Diamond at Alumni Field • Hammond, LA	4–6	Lirette, Luke (2-1)	**Salinas, Josh (2-4)**	St. Pierre, Brady (6)	ESPN+	1,027	14–19	2–15
Apr 6	Southeastern Louisiana		Pat Kenelly Diamond at Alumni Field • Hammond, LA	1–5	Lobell, Blake (4-1)	**Elizondo, Jackson (3-4)**	None	ESPN+	1,199	14–20	2–16
Apr 8	Prairie View A&M*		Sullivan Field • San Antonio, TX	18–2^{7}	**Garcia, EJ (3-3)**	McMillan, Marcus (0-2)	None		92	15–20	
Apr 9	Tarleton State*		Sullivan Field • San Antonio, TX	6–12	Lucas, Aden (3-2)	**Bush, Jordan (0-2)**	None		142	15–21	
Apr 11	McNeese		Sullivan Field • San Antonio, TX	6–11	Golden, Cooper (2-2)	**McKay, Gus (2-4)**	None	ESPN+	144	15–22	2–17
Apr 12	McNeese		Sullivan Field • San Antonio, TX	1–8	Gravel, Alexis (4-1)	**Salinas, Josh (2-5)**	None	ESPN+	263	15–23	2–18
Apr 13	McNeese		Sullivan Field • San Antonio, TX	7–14	Coppinger, Paul (2-0)	**Posey, Jonah (1-1)**	None	ESPN+	188	15–24	2–19
Apr 15	at Abilene Christian*		Crutcher Scott Field • Abilene, TX	5–13	Campa, Iain (2-2)	**Garcia, EJ (3-4)**	None	ESPN+	356	15–25	
Apr 22	UT Rio Grande Valley*		UTRGV Baseball Stadium • Edinburg, TX	10–2	**Garcia, EJ (4-4)**	Thayer, Harrison (2-2)	None		4,408	16–25	
Apr 25	at Texas A&M–Corpus Christi		Chapman Field • Corpus Christi, TX	6–10	Garcia, Zach (5-4)	**Salinas, Josh (2-6)**	None	ESPN+	475	16–26	2–20
Apr 26	at Texas A&M–Corpus Christi		Chapman Field • Corpus Christi, TX	5–10	Burdick, Gage (3-3)	**Hargett, Hunter (1-2)**	None	ESPN+	323	16–27	2–21
Apr 27	at Texas A&M–Corpus Christi		Chapman Field • Corpus Christi, TX	9–3	**Elizondo, Jackson (4-4)**	Shea, Bryson (1-4)	**Robles, Bruno (1)**	ESPN+	403	17–27	3–21

May (0–6)
Date	Opponent	Rank	Site/stadium	Score	Win	Loss	Save	TV	Attendance	Overall record	SLC Record
May 3	UT Rio Grande Valley		Sullivan Field • San Antonio, TX	10–14	Cienfuegos, Kike (2-0)	Garcia, EJ (4-5)	None	ESPN+	287	17–28	3–22
May 3	UT Rio Grande Valley		Sullivan Field • San Antonio, TX	10–13	Oliva, Steven (1-2)	McKay, Gus (2-5)	None	ESPN+	315	17–29	3–23
May 4	UT Rio Grande Valley		Sullivan Field • San Antonio, TX	5–16^{8}	Limas, Jacob (2-2)	Elizondo, Jackson (4-5)	None	ESPN+	312	17–30	3–24
May 6	UTSA		Sullivan Field • San Antonio, TX				**Cancelled due to inclement weather. Game will not be made up.**				
May 8	at Stephen F. Austin		Jaycees Field • Nacogdoches, TX	12–14	Bowyer, Reid (3-1)	Robles, Bruno (1-1)	Balmaceda, Elian (1)	ESPN+	142	17–31	3–25
May 9	at Stephen F. Austin		Jaycees Field • Nacogdoches, TX	2–6	C. Templeton (6-4)	Garcia, EJ (5-6)	None	ESPN+	159	17–32	3–26
May 10	at Stephen F. Austin		Jaycees Field • Nacogdoches, TX	12–13	R. Bowyer (4-1)	Byrd, Adam (0-2)	R. Boyett (3)	ESPN+	225	17–33	3–27

Schedule source:
