= 2025 New Orleans Privateers baseball team =

2025 New Orleans Privateers baseball
- Conference: Southland Conference
- Record: 28–26 (12–18 Southland)
- Head coach: Dax Norris (1st season)
- Assistant coaches: Phillip Hurst; Brooks DuBose
- Home stadium: Maestri Field at Privateer Park

2025 Southland Conference baseball standings
	Conf.				Overall
Team	W		L	PCT	W		L	PCT
Southeastern Louisiana ‍†‍‍	22	–	8	.733	38	–	16	.704
UT Rio Grande Valley ‍†‍‍	22	–	8	.733	36	–	18	.667
Lamar ‍‍‍	20	–	10	.667	40	–	17	.702
McNeese ‍‍‍	19	–	11	.633	31	–	17	.646
Northwestern State ‍‍‍	19	–	11	.633	35	–	21	.625
Houston Christian ‍‍‡‍^{y}	17	–	13	.567	32	–	25	.561
New Orleans ‍‍‍	12	–	18	.400	28	–	26	.519
Texas A&M–Corpus Christi ‍‍‍	12	–	18	.400	21	–	31	.404
Nicholls ‍‍‍	10	–	20	.333	17	–	32	.347
Stephen F. Austin ‍‍‍	9	–	21	.300	18	–	31	.367
Incarnate Word ‍‍‍	3	–	27	.100	17	–	33	.340
† – Conference champion ‡ – Tournament champion y – Invited to the NCAA Tournament; As of May 31, 2025; Rankings from D1Baseball

The 2025 New Orleans Privateers baseball team represented the University of New Orleans during the 2025 NCAA Division I baseball season. They played their home games at Maestri Field at Privateer Park and were led by first–year head coach Dax Norris. They are members of the Southland Conference. New Orleans compiled a 28–26 overall record and a 12–18 conference record. The Privateers won the Hammond Bracket of the 2025 SLC tournament with a 3–0 record. Their season ended with a 0–2 record in the SLC tournament Championship series.

== Preseason ==
=== Southland Conference Coaches Poll ===
The Southland Conference Coaches Poll was released on February 6, 2025. New Orleans was picked to finish sixth in the Southland Conference with 128 overall votes.

Coaches poll
Predicted finish	Team	Votes (1st place)
1	Lamar	197 (18)
2	Southeastern Louisiana	146 (4)
3	McNeese	145
4	UT Rio Grande Valley	144
5	Nicholls	129
6	New Orleans	128
7	Incarnate Word	95
8	Northwestern State	89
9	Texas A&M–Corpus Christi	73
10	Houston Christian	37
11	Stephen F. Austin	27

=== Preseason All-Southland team ===
Tristian Moore and Bryce Calloway were named to the conference preseason first team. Diego Villsecas was named to the conference preseason second team.

==== First Team ====
- Zak Skinner* (LU, JR, Catcher)
- Brayden Evans* (LU, JR, 1st Base)
- Isaac Webb* (TAMU, SR, 2nd Base)
- TJ Salvaggio (SELU, SR, Shortstop)
- Rocco Gump (NWST, SR, 3rd Base)
- Reese Lipoma* (NWST, RSR, Outfielder)
- Connor Westenburg (McN, SR, Outfielder)
- Cole Stromboe+ (SELU, RSR, Outfielder)
- Tristian Moore+ (UNO, RSR, Outfielder)
- Bryce Calloway* (UNO, SR, Utility)
- Rey Mendoza (UIW, GR, Designated Hitter)
- Brennan Stuprich* (SELU, RSR, Starting Pitcher)
- Josh Salinas (UIW, GR, Starting Pitcher)
- Zach Garcia (TAMU, SR, Starting Pitcher)
- Kyle Moseley (LU, SR, Relief Pitcher)

*-2024 Southland All-Conference Selection
+-Tie for final spot

==== Second Team ====
- Steven Lancia (UTRGV, SR, Catcher)
- Martin Vazquez (UTRGV, SR, 1st Base)
- Diego Villsecas* (UNO, SR, 2nd Base)
- Isaac Lopez (UTRGV, GR, Shortstop)
- Easton Moomau+ (UTRGV, SO, 3rd Base)
- Matt Ryan+ (LU, SR, 3rd Base)
- Balin Valentine (NWST, SR, Outfielder)
- Parker Coley (SELU, SR, Outfielder)
- Jude Hall (SELU, SR, Outfielder)
- Simon Larranaga (MCN, SR, Utility)
- Armani Raygoza (UTRGV, RSO, Designated Hitter)
- Parker Edwards (HCU, SR, Starting Pitcher)
- Angelo Cabral (UTRGV, GR, Starting Pitcher)
- Tyler Bryan (NWST, JR, Starting Pitcher)
- Larson Fabre (SELU, JR, Relief Pitcher)

*-2024 Southland All-Conference Selection
+-Tie for final spot

== Schedule and results ==
Legend
	New Orleans win
	New Orleans loss
	Postponement/Cancellation/Suspensions
**Bold**	New Orleans team member
*	Non-Conference game
†	Make-Up Game

2025 New Orleans Privateers baseball game log (28–26)
Regular season (25–24)

February (5–3)
Date	Opponent	Rank	Site/stadium	Score	Win	Loss	Save	TV	Attendance	Overall record	SLC Record
Feb 14	at West Georgia*		Cole Field • Carrollton, GA	3–18	L. Pearson (1–0)	**Edwards, Grant (0–1)**	B. Parks (1)		322	0–1	
Feb 15	at West Georgia*		Cole Field • Carrollton, GA	10–11	Gavin Mask (1–0)	**Torrez, Aiden (0-0)**	None		227	0–2	
Feb 15	at West Georgia*		Cole Field • Carrollton, GA	13–5^{5}	**Toney, Sawyer (1–0)**	Seth Dudley (0–1)	None		202	1–2	
Feb 21	Boston College*		Maestri Field at Privateer Park • New Orleans, LA	5–4	**Kimball, Carson (1–0)**	Peter Schaefer (0–1)	**Calloway, Bryce (1)**	ESPN+	387	2–2	
Feb 22	Boston College*		Maestri Field at Privateer Park • New Orleans, LA	3–11	Cesar Gonzalez (1–0)	Longshore, Zach (0–1)	None	ESPN+	315	2–3	
Feb 23	Boston College*		Maestri Field at Privateer Park • New Orleans, LA	7–6^{11}	**Syversen, Cole (1–0)**	Bobby Chicoine (0–1)	None	ESPN+	315	3–3	
Feb 25	at South Alabama*		Eddie Stanky Field • Mobile, AL	13–2^{8}	**Jones, Skylar (1–0)**	Brian Garmon (0–1) (-)	None	ESPN+	971	4–3	
Feb 28	at Stephen F. Austin		Jaycees Field • Nacogdoches, TX	3–2	**Austin, Ira (1–0)**	Zeplin (1–2)	**Calloway, Bryce (2)**	ESPN+	148	5–3	1–0

March (9–9)
Date	Opponent	Rank	Site/stadium	Score	Win	Loss	Save	TV	Attendance	Overall record	SLC Record
Mar 1	at Stephen F. Austin		Jaycees Field • Nacogdoches, TX	4–14^{7}	D. Mulcahy (1–0)	**Longshore, Zach (0–2)**	None	ESPN+	134	5–4	1–1
Mar 2	at Stephen F. Austin		Jaycees Field • Nacogdoches, TX	3–2	**Jones, Skylar (2–0)**	E. Balmaceda (0–2)	**Calloway, Bryce (3)**	ESPN+	162	6–4	2–1
Mar 5	Jackson State*		Maestri Field at Privateer Park • New Orleans, LA	16–10	**Green, Myles (1–0)**	Didder, Nkosi (1–2)	None	ESPN+	289	7–4	
Mar 7	UT Rio Grande Valley		Maestri Field at Privateer Park • New Orleans, LA	5–10	Wiatrek, Wyatt (2–0)	**Toney, Sawyer (1-1)**	None	ESPN+	355	7–5	2–2
Mar 8	UT Rio Grande Valley		Maestri Field at Privateer Park • New Orleans, LA	8–14	Loa, Víctor (3–1)	**Longshore, Zach (0–3)**	None	ESPN+	377	7–6	2–3
Mar 9	UT Rio Grande Valley		Maestri Field at Privateer Park • New Orleans, LA	2–9	Limas, Jacob (1–0)	**Bienvenu, Matthew (0–1)**	None	ESPN+	345	7–7	2–4
Mar 11	Xavier (Louisiana)*		Maestri Field at Privateer Park • New Orleans, LA	17–7^{7}	**Clayton, Canaan (1–0)**	Morris, Zion (0-0)	None	ESPN+	355	8–7	
Mar 14	at Incarnate Word		Sullivan Field • San Antonio, TX	18–9	**Torrez, Aiden (1-1)**	Salinas, Josh (2-2)	Toney, Sawyer (1)	ESPN+	182	9–7	3–4
Mar 15	at Incarnate Word		Sullivan Field • San Antonio, TX	10–7	**Jones, Skylar (3–0)**	Elizondo, Jackson (2–3)	**Calloway, Bryce (4)**	ESPN+	218	10–7	4–4
Mar 16	at Incarnate Word		Sullivan Field • San Antonio, TX	12–6	**Bienvenu, Matthew (1-1)**	McKay, Gus (1-1)	None	ESPN+	178	11–7	5–4
Mar 18	at No. 2 LSU*		Alex Box Stadium, Skip Bertman Field • Baton Rouge, LA	1–11^{7}	Noot, Jaden (1–0)	**Canaan, Clayton (1-1)**	None	SECN+/ESPN+	10,424	11–8	
Mar 21	Northwestern State		Maestri Field at Privateer Park • New Orleans, LA	0–1	Marionneaux, Dylan (2-2)	**Edwards, Grant (0–2)**	None	ESPN+	389	11–9	5–5
Mar 22	Northwestern State		Maestri Field at Privateer Park • New Orleans, LA	3–1	**Syversen, Cole (3–0)**	Bryan, Tyler (1–3)	**Calloway, Bryce (5)**	ESPN+	311	12–9	6–5
Mar 23	Northwestern State		Maestri Field at Privateer Park • New Orleans, LA	9–10	Leonard, Bryce (2–1)	Usey, Tre (0–1)		ESPN+	387	12–10	6–6
Mar 25	Tulane*		Maestri Field at Privateer Park • New Orleans, LA	7–6	**Austin, Ira (2–0)**	Henry Shuffler (0–1)	**Calloway, Bryce (6)**	ESPN+	627	13–10	
Ponchartrain Bowl
Mar 28	Southeastern Louisiana		Maestri Field at Privateer Park • New Orleans, LA	4–1	**Edwards, Grant (1–2)**	Stuprich, Brennan (6–1)	**Calloway, Bryce (7)**	ESPN+	478	14–10	7–6
Mar 29	Southeastern Louisiana		Maestri Field at Privateer Park • New Orleans, LA	3–8	Vosburg, Aiden (2–1)	**Jones, Skylar (3–1)**	None	ESPN+	512	14–11	7–7
Mar 30	Southeastern Louisiana		Maestri Field at Privateer Park • New Orleans, LA	5–17^{8}	Lobell, Blake (3–1)	**Syversen, Cole (3–1)**	None	ESPN+	518	14–12	7–8

April (9–8)
Date	Opponent	Rank	Site/stadium	Score	Win	Loss	Save	TV	Attendance	Overall record	SLC Record
Apr 1	Southern*		Maestri Field at Privateer Park • New Orleans, LA	20–9^{7}	**Torrez, Aiden (2–1)**	Newman, Jeremiah (0–1)	None	ESPN+	294	15–12	
Apr 4	at McNeese		Joe Miller Ballpark • Lake Charles, LA	5–8	Blackwell, Jake (1-1)	**Austin, Ira (1-1)**	Corcoran, Brady (2)	ESPN+	990	15–13	7–9
Apr 5	at McNeese		Joe Miller Ballpark • Lake Charles, LA	8–10	Primeaux, Parker (2–0)	**Kimball, Carson (1-1)**	Blackwell, Jake (2)	ESPN+	990	15–14	7–10
Apr 6	at McNeese		Joe Miller Ballpark • Lake Charles, LA	2–3	Blackwell, Jake (2–1)	**Calloway, Bryce (0–1)**	None	ESPN+	954	15–15	7–11
Apr 9	at Southern*		Lee–Hines Field • Baton Rouge, LA	15–4^{7}	**O'Dell, Hayden (0-0)**	Newman, Jeremiah (0-0)	None		423	16–15	
Apr 11	UNC Asheville*		Maestri Field at Privateer Park • New Orleans, LA	15–1^{7}	**Edwards, Grant (2-2)**	Lopez, Tony (0–3)	None	ESPN+	359	17–15	
Apr 12	UNC Asheville*		Maestri Field at Privateer Park • New Orleans, LA	5–4	**Austin, Ira (3–1)**	Nguyen-Brown, Daylinh (0–3)	None	ESPN+	489	18–15	
Apr 13	UNC Asheville*		Maestri Field at Privateer Park • New Orleans, LA	3–2	**Longshore, Zach (1–3)**	Crum, Garrett (2–1)	**Calloway, Bryce (8)**	ESPN+	544	19–15	
Apr 15	at Tulane*†		Greer Field at Turchin Stadium • New Orleans, LA	10–5	**Toney, Sawyer (2–1)**	Sauer, John-Paul (1-1)	None	ESPN+	2,005	20–15	
Apr 17	Houston Christian		Maestri Field at Privateer Park • New Orleans, LA	10–5	**Edwards, Grant (3–2)**	Castano, Louis (4–1)	None	ESPN+	406	21–15	8–11
Apr 18	Houston Christian		Maestri Field at Privateer Park • New Orleans, LA	9–7	**Calloway, Bryce (1-1)**	Mentzel, Kyler (1–2)	None	ESPN+	425	22–15	9–11
Apr 19	Houston Christian		Maestri Field at Privateer Park • New Orleans, LA	6–5	**Austin, Ira (4–1)**	Caravalho, Joshua (7–2)	None	ESPN+	488	23–15	10–11
Apr 23	South Alabama*		Maestri Field at Privateer Park • New Orleans, LA			Canceled					
Apr 25	at Lamar		Vincent–Beck Stadium • Beaumont, TX	3–4^{10}	Havard, Peyton (6–1)	**Austin, Ira (4–2)**	None	ESPN+		23–16	10–12
Apr 26	at Lamar		Vincent–Beck Stadium • Beaumont, TX	2–3	Olivier, Chris (6–1)	**Longshore, Zach (1–4)**	Krkovski, Luke (2)	ESPN+	705	23–17	10–13
Apr 27	at Lamar		Vincent–Beck Stadium • Beaumont, TX	3–13^{8}	Havard, Peyton (7–1)	**Torrez, Aiden (2-2)**	None	ESPN+		23–18	10–14
Apr 29	at No. 22 Southern Miss*		Pete Taylor Park • Hattiesburg, MS	4–9	Sivley, Kros (4–1)	**Austin, Ira (4–3)**	Allen, Colby (9)	ESPN+	5,234	23–19	
Apr 30	at Jackson State*†		Braddy Field • Jackson, MS	14–15	Lourens, JeAndrick (1–3)	**Usey, Trey (0–2)**	Elliott, Eric (1)		69	23–20	

May (2–4)
Date	Opponent	Rank	Site/stadium	Score	Win	Loss	Save	TV	Attendance	Overall record	SLC Record
May 2	Nicholls		Maestri Field at Privateer Park • New Orleans, LA	2–7	Jordan, Harper (4–3)	**Edwards, Grant (3-3)**	Simoneaux, Cole (3)	ESPN+	603	23–21	10–15
May 3	Nicholls		Maestri Field at Privateer Park • New Orleans, LA	3–2	**Calloway, Bryce (2–1)**	Bordelon, Joseph (0–1)	None	ESPN+	603	24–21	11–15
May 4	Nicholls		Maestri Field at Privateer Park • New Orleans, LA	9–4	**O'Dell, Hayden (2–0)**	Simoneaux, Cole (0–2)	None	ESPN+	637	25–21	12–15
May 6	at Tulane*		Greer Field at Turchin Stadium • New Orleans, LA			Canceled					
May 9	at Texas A&M–Corpus Christi		Chapman Field • Corpus Christi, TX	2–4	Burdick, Gage (4–3)	**Edwards, Grant (3–4)**	Molina, Matthew (3)	ESPN+	287	25–22	12–16
May 10	at Texas A&M–Corpus Christi		Chapman Field • Corpus Christi, TX	5–11	Garcia, Zach (6–4)	Longshore, Zach (1–5)	None	ESPN+	347	25–23	12–17
May 11	at Texas A&M–Corpus Christi†		Chapman Field • Corpus Christi, TX	4–5	Soliz, Cam (2–3)	**Calloway, Bryce (2-2)**	Molina, Matthew (4)	ESPN+	323	25–24	12–18

Postseason (3–2)

SLC Tournament (Hammond Bracket) (3–0)
Date	Opponent	Seed/Rank	Site/stadium	Score	Win	Loss	Save	TV	Attendance	Overall record	Tournament record
May 15	at (1) Southeastern Louisiana	(8)	Pat Kenelly Diamond at Alumni Field • Hammond, LA	10–6	**Longshore, Zach (2–5)**	Stuprich, Brennan (9–5)	**Calloway, Bryce (9)**	ESPN+	1,123	26–24	1–0
May 16	vs (4) Northwestern State	(8)	Pat Kenelly Diamond at Alumni Field • Hammond, LA	3–2	**O'Dell, Hayden (3–0)**	Bryan, Tyler (2–7)	**Calloway, Bryce (10)**	ESPN+	625	27–24	2–0
May 17	vs (4) Northwestern State	(8)	Pat Kenelly Diamond at Alumni Field • Hammond, LA	12–11	**Kimball, Carson (2–1)**	Anderson, Austin (3–1)	**Calloway, Bryce (11)**	ESPN+	901	28–24	3–0

SLC Tournament (Championship series) (0–2)
Date	Opponent	Seed/Rank	Site/stadium	Score	Win	Loss	Save	TV	Attendance	Overall record	Tournament record
May 22	at (6) Houston Christian	(8)	Husky Field • Houston, TX	3–8	Edwards, Parker (3–4)	**Longshore, Zach (2–6)**	None	ESPN+	543	28–25	0–1
May 23	at (6) Houston Christian	(8)	Husky Field • Houston, TX	11–16	Castano, Louis (7–1)	**Edwards, Grant (3–5)**	Norton, Ben (9)	ESPN+	563	28–26	0–2

Legend: = Win = Loss = Cancelled
Bold = New Orleans team member
Rankings are based on the team's current ranking in the D1Baseball poll.

Schedule source:
