= 2025 Texas A&M–Corpus Christi Islanders baseball team =

American college baseball season

2025 Texas A&M–Corpus Christi Islanders baseball
- Conference: Southland Conference
- Record: 21–31 (12–18 Southland)
- Head coach: Scott Malone (18th season)
- Assistant coaches: Christian Reyes; Scott Kelly; Noe Ruiz, Jr.; Eric Sandoz; Zack Henry
- Home stadium: Chapman Field

2025 Southland Conference baseball standings
| | Conf. | | | | Overall |
| Team | W | | L | PCT | W | | L | PCT |
|---|---|---|---|---|---|---|---|---|
| Southeastern Louisiana ‍†‍‍ | 22 | – | 8 | .733 | 38 | – | 16 | .704 |
| UT Rio Grande Valley ‍†‍‍ | 22 | – | 8 | .733 | 36 | – | 18 | .667 |
| Lamar ‍‍‍ | 20 | – | 10 | .667 | 40 | – | 17 | .702 |
| McNeese ‍‍‍ | 19 | – | 11 | .633 | 31 | – | 17 | .646 |
| Northwestern State ‍‍‍ | 19 | – | 11 | .633 | 35 | – | 21 | .625 |
| Houston Christian ‍‍‡‍^{y} | 17 | – | 13 | .567 | 32 | – | 25 | .561 |
| New Orleans ‍‍‍ | 12 | – | 18 | .400 | 28 | – | 26 | .519 |
| Texas A&M–Corpus Christi ‍‍‍ | 12 | – | 18 | .400 | 21 | – | 31 | .404 |
| Nicholls ‍‍‍ | 10 | – | 20 | .333 | 17 | – | 32 | .347 |
| Stephen F. Austin ‍‍‍ | 9 | – | 21 | .300 | 18 | – | 31 | .367 |
| Incarnate Word ‍‍‍ | 3 | – | 27 | .100 | 17 | – | 33 | .340 |
† – Conference champion ‡ – Tournament champion y – Invited to the NCAA Tournament; As of May 31, 2025; Rankings from D1Baseball

The 2025 Texas A&M–Corpus Christi Islanders baseball team represented Texas A&M University–Corpus Christi during the 2025 NCAA Division I baseball season. The Islanders played their home games at Chapman Field and Whataburger Field. They were led by eighteenth–year head coach Scott Malone as members of the Southland Conference. Texas A&M–Corpus Christi compiled a 21–31 overall record and a 12–18 conference record. The Islanders' season ended with a 1–2 record in the 2025 SLC tournament.

== Preseason ==
=== Southland Conference Coaches Poll ===
The Southland Conference Coaches Poll was released on February 6, 2025. Texas A&M–Corpus Christi was picked to finish ninth in the Southland Conference with 73 overall votes.

Coaches poll
| Predicted finish | Team | Votes (1st place) |
| 1 | Lamar | 197 (18) |
| 2 | Southeastern Louisiana | 146 (4) |
| 3 | McNeese | 145 |
| 4 | UT Rio Grande Valley | 144 |
| 5 | Nicholls | 129 |
| 6 | New Orleans | 128 |
| 7 | Incarnate Word | 95 |
| 8 | Northwestern State | 89 |
| 9 | Texas A&M–Corpus Christi | 73 |
| 10 | Houston Christian | 37 |
| 11 | Stephen F. Austin | 27 |

=== Preseason All-Southland team ===
Isaac Webb and Zach Garcia were named to the conference preseason first team. No Islanders were named to the conference preseason second team.

==== First Team ====
- Zak Skinner* (LU, JR, Catcher)
- Brayden Evans* (LU, JR, 1st Base)
- Isaac Webb* (TAMUCC, SR, 2nd Base)
- TJ Salvaggio (SELU, SR, Shortstop)
- Rocco Gump (NWST, SR, 3rd Base)
- Reese Lipoma* (NWST, RSR, Outfielder)
- Connor Westenburg (McN, SR, Outfielder)
- Cole Stromboe+ (SELU, RSR, Outfielder)
- Tristian Moore+ (UNO, RSR, Outfielder)
- Bryce Calloway* (UNO, SR, Utility)
- Rey Mendoza (UIW, GR, Designated Hitter)
- Brennan Stuprich* (SELU, RSR, Starting Pitcher)
- Josh Salinas (UIW, GR, Starting Pitcher)
- Zach Garcia (TAMUCC, SR, Starting Pitcher)
- Kyle Moseley (LU, SR, Relief Pitcher)

*-2024 Southland All-Conference Selection
+-Tie for final spot

==== Second Team ====
- Steven Lancia (UTRGV, SR, Catcher)
- Martin Vazquez (UTRGV, SR, 1st Base)
- Diego Villsecas* (UNO, SR, 2nd Base)
- Isaac Lopez (UTRGV, GR, Shortstop)
- Easton Moomau+ (UTRGV, SO, 3rd Base)
- Matt Ryan+ (LU, SR, 3rd Base)
- Balin Valentine (NWST, SR, Outfielder)
- Parker Coley (SELU, SR, Outfielder)
- Jude Hall (SELU, SR, Outfielder)
- Simon Larranaga (MCN, SR, Utility)
- Armani Raygoza (UTRGV, RSO, Designated Hitter)
- Parker Edwards (HCU, SR, Starting Pitcher)
- Angelo Cabral (UTRGV, GR, Starting Pitcher)
- Tyler Bryan (NWST, JR, Starting Pitcher)
- Larson Fabre (SELU, JR, Relief Pitcher)

*-2024 Southland All-Conference Selection
+-Tie for final spot

== Schedule and results ==
Legend
| | Texas A&M–Corpus Christi win |
| | Texas A&M–Corpus Christi loss |
| | Postponement/Cancelation/Suspensions |
| **Bold** | Texas A&M–Corpus Christi team member |
| * | Non-Conference game |
| † | Make-Up Game |

2024 Texas A&M–Corpus Christi Islanders baseball game log (21–31)
Regular season (20–29)

February (4–6)
| Date | Opponent | Rank | Site/stadium | Score | Win | Loss | Save | TV | Attendance | Overall record | SLC Record |
|---|---|---|---|---|---|---|---|---|---|---|---|
| Feb 14 | Kansas* | | Whataburger Field • Corpus Christi, TX | 5–8^{10} | Vetock, Malakai (1-0) | **Soliz, Cam (0-1)** | Cubbler, Jake (1) | | 284 | 0–1 | |
| Feb 15 | Kansas* | | Whataburger Field • Corpus Christi, TX | 1–11 | West, Manning (1-0) | **Singleton, Luke (0-1)** | None | | 466 | 0–2 | |
| Feb 16 | Kansas* | | Whataburger Field • Corpus Christi, TX | 0–8 | Carr, Kannon (1-0) | **Burdick, Gage (0-1)** | None | | 300 | 0–3 | |
| Feb 17 | Kansas* | | Whataburger Field • Corpus Christi, TX | 0–16^{7} | Moore, Cooper (1-0) | **Soliz, Cam (0-2)** | None | | 346 | 0–4 | |
Kleberg Bank College Classic
| Feb 21 | UCLA* | | Whataburger Field • Corpus Christi, TX | 4–3 | **Garcia, Zach (1-0)** | Delvecchio, Cody (0-1) | **Soliz, Cam (1)** | | 765 | 1–4 | |
| Feb 22 | Michigan State* | | Whataburger Field • Corpus Christi, TX | 3–8 | Maxey,Zach (2-0) | **Singleton, Luke (0-2)** | None | | 674 | 1–5 | |
| Feb 23 | Washington State* | | Whataburger Field • Corpus Christi, TX | 8–6 | **Shea, Bryson (1-0)** | Chambers, Bryce (0-2) | **Soliz, Cam (2)** | | 701 | 2–5 | |
| Feb 24 | Washington State* | | Chapman Field • Corpus Christi, TX | 8–2 | **LaRusso, Braden (1-0)** | Robinson, Jake (0-1) | None | | 150 | 3–5 | |
| Feb 26 | at Houston–Victoria* | | Riverside Stadium • Victoria, TX | 4–6 | M. Longoria (5-1) | **Hill, Dylan (0-1)** | J. Baker (1) | | 300 | 3–6 | |
| Feb 28 | Prairie View A&M* | | Chapman Field • Corpus Christi, TX | 14–4^{8} | **Garcia, Zach (2-0)** | Landyn Grant (1-2) | None | | 410 | 4–6 | |

March (6–14)
| Date | Opponent | Rank | Site/stadium | Score | Win | Loss | Save | TV | Attendance | Overall record | SLC Record |
|---|---|---|---|---|---|---|---|---|---|---|---|
| Mar 1 | Prairie View A&M* | | Chapman Field • Corpus Christi, TX | 10–7 | **Singleton, Luke (1-2)** | Tyson Carlton (0-3) | **Soliz, Cam (3)** | | 292 | 5–6 | |
| Mar 2 | Prairie View A&M* | | Chapman Field • Corpus Christi, TX | 12–6 | **Dean, David (1-0)** | Camden Farmer (0-1) | None | | 287 | 6–6 | |
| Mar 4 | at #12 Texas* | | UFCU Disch–Falk Field • Austin, TX | 5–15^{8} | Ruger Riojas (2-0) | LaRusso, Braden (1-1) | None | SECN+ | 6,938 | 6–7 | |
| Mar 7 | at Nicholls | | Ben Meyer Diamond at Ray E. Didier Field • Thibodaux, LA | 2–3 | Jordan, Harper (2-1) | Garcia, Zach (2-1) | None | | 555 | 6–8 | 0–1 |
| Mar 8 | at Nicholls | | Ben Meyer Diamond at Ray E. Didier Field • Thibodaux, LA | 3–15^{7} | Sparks, Alec (3-1) | **Singleton, Luke (1-3)** | None | | 311 | 6–9 | 0–2 |
| Mar 9 | at Nicholls | | Ben Meyer Diamond at Ray E. Didier Field • Thibodaux, LA | 2–7 | Hill, Dalton (2-3) | **Shea, Bryson (1-1)** | None | | 433 | 6–10 | 0–3 |
| Mar 10 | at Rice* | | Reckling Park • Houston, TX | 9–4 | | | | | | 7–10 | |
| Mar 11 | Texas Southern* | | Chapman Field • Corpus Christi, TX | 13–14 | Sidney Moore (1-0) | **Darden, Nathan (0-1)** | Leeroy Tavarez (1) | | 442 | 7–11 | |
| Mar 14 | Northwestern State | | Chapman Field • Corpus Christi, TX | 0–5 | Marionneaux, Dylan (1-2) | Garcia, Zach (2-2) | None | ESPN+ | 447 | 7–12 | 0–4 |
| Mar 15 | Northwestern State | | Chapman Field • Corpus Christi, TX | 5–2 | **Burdick, G (1-1)** | Bryan, Tyler (1-2) | None | | 469 | 8–12 | 1–4 |
| Mar 16 | Northwestern State | | Chapman Field • Corpus Christi, TX | 0–8 | Hillen, Trent (3-1) | **Smith, E (0-1)** | None | ESPN+ | 422 | 8–13 | 1–5 |
| Mar 18 | at Texas A&M* | | Olsen Field at Blue Bell Park • College Station, TX | 7–17^{7} | Cunningham, Grant (1-0) | **Molina (0-1)** | None | SECN+ | 5,226 | 8–14 | |
| Mar 19 | Prairie View A&M* | | John W. Tankersley Field • Prairie View, TX | 8–2 | **Preston Watkins(1-0)** | Corey Battey(0-1) | None | | 75 | 9–14 | |
| Mar 21 | at Lamar | | Vincent–Beck Stadium • Beaumont, TX | 0–2 | Hunsaker, Riely (2-2) | **Garcia, Zach (2-3)** | Havard, Peyton (1) | ESPN+ | 1,087 | 9–15 | 1–6 |
| Mar 22 | at Lamar | | Vincent–Beck Stadium • Beaumont, TX | 6–12 | Sutton, Carter (3-0) | **Shea, Bryson (1-2)** | Ramirez, Fabian (1) | ESPN+ | 850 | 9–16 | 1–7 |
| Mar 23 | at Lamar | | Vincent–Beck Stadium • Beaumont, TX | 0–8 | Olivier, Chris (3-1) | Dean, David (1-1) | **Neal, Austin (2**) | ESPN+ | 675 | 9–17 | 1–8 |
| Mar 25 | Houston–Victoria* | | Chapman Field • Corpus Christi, TX | 5–6 | Justin Mireles (1-1) | **Soliz, Cam (0-3)** | Jacob Baker (5) | | 327 | 9–18 | |
South Texas Showdown
| Mar 28 | UT Rio Grande Valley | | Chapman Field • Corpus Christi, TX | | | | **Postponed due to inclement weather** | | | | |
| Mar 29 | UT Rio Grande Valley | | Chapman Field • Corpus Christi, TX | 2–3 | Cabral, Angelo (3-0) | **Burdick, Gage (1-2)** | Oliva, Steven (3) | ESPN+ | 862 | 9–19 | 1–9 |
| Mar 29 | UT Rio Grande Valley | | Chapman Field • Corpus Christi, TX | 8–11 | Wiatrek, Wyatt (4-0) | **Dean, David (1-2)** | Nolan, Nick (1) | ESPN+ | 875 | 9–20 | 1–10 |
| Mar 30 | UT Rio Grande Valley | | Chapman Field • Corpus Christi, TX | 3–2 | **Burdick, Gage (2-2)** | Thayer, Harrison (1-1) | None | ESPN+ | 467 | 10–20 | 2–11 |

April (6–7)
| Date | Opponent | Rank | Site/stadium | Score | Win | Loss | Save | TV | Attendance | Overall record | SLC Record |
|---|---|---|---|---|---|---|---|---|---|---|---|
| Apr 2 | at Houston* | | Schroeder Park • Houston, TX | 1–9 | Scinta, Chris (3-1) | **Watkins, Preston (1-1)** | None | | 939 | 10–21 | |
| Apr 4 | at Stephen F. Austin | | Jaycees Field • Nacogdoches, TX | 14–7 | **Garcia, Zach (3-3)** | Templeton, Cody (3-2) | None | ESPN+ | 102 | 11–21 | 3–11 |
| Apr 6 | at Stephen F. Austin | | Jaycees Field • Nacogdoches, TX | 8–5^{16} | **Soliz, Cam (1-3)** | Bowyer, Reid (2-1) | None | ESPN+ | 133 | 12–21 | 4–11 |
| Apr 7 | at Stephen F. Austin | | Jaycees Field • Nacogdoches, TX | 6–4 | **Crane, Tristan (1-0)** | Munson, Kadin (0-2) | **Molina, Matthew (1)** | ESPN+ | | 13–21 | 5–11 |
| Apr 8 | UTSA* | | Chapman Field • Corpus Christi, TX | | | | **Canceled due to inclement weather** | | | | |
| Apr 11 | Southeastern Louisiana | | Chapman Field • Corpus Christi, TX | 3–11 | Stuprich, Brennan (6-2) | **Garcia, Zach (3-4)** | None | ESPN+ | 341 | 13–22 | 5–12 |
| Apr 12 | Southeastern Louisiana | | Chapman Field • Corpus Christi, TX | 2–9 | Lirette, Luke (3-1) | **Dean, David (1-3)** | None | ESPN+ | 335 | 13–23 | 5–13 |
| Apr 13 | Southeastern Louisiana | | Chapman Field • Corpus Christi, TX | 5–14 | Lobell, Blake (5-1) | **Shea, Bryson (1-3)** | None | ESPN+ | 306 | 13–24 | 5–14 |
| Apr 17 | at McNeese | | Joe Miller Ballpark • Lake Charles, LA | 5–8 | Golden, Cooper (3-2) | **Burdick, Gage (2-3)** | None | ESPN+ | 1,075 | 13–25 | 5–15 |
| Apr 18 | at McNeese | | Joe Miller Ballpark • Lake Charles, LA | 13–5 | **Garcia, Zach (4-4)** | Gravel, Alexis (4-2) | None | ESPN+ | 999 | 14–25 | 6–15 |
| Apr 19 | at McNeese | | Joe Miller Ballpark • Lake Charles, LA | 1–3 | Lopez, Sergio (5-1) | **David, Dean (1-4)** | Blackwell, Jake (3) | ESPN+ | 1,233 | 14–26 | 6–16 |
| Apr 22 | UTSA* | | Chapman Field • Corpus Christi, TX | | | | **Canceled due to inclement weather** | | | | |
| Apr 25 | Incarnate Word | | Chapman Field • Corpus Christi, TX | 10–6 | **Garcia, Zach (5-4)** | Salinas, Josh (2-6) | None | ESPN+ | 475 | 15–26 | 7–16 |
| Apr 26 | Incarnate Word | | Chapman Field • Corpus Christi, TX | 10–5 | **Burdick, Gage (3-3)** | Hargett, Hunter (1-2) | None | ESPN+ | 323 | 16–26 | 8–16 |
| Apr 27 | Incarnate Word | | Chapman Field • Corpus Christi, TX | 3–9 | Elizondo, Jackson (4-4) | **Shea, Bryson (1-4)** | Robles, Bruno (1) | ESPN+ | 403 | 16–27 | 8–17 |

May (4–2)
| Date | Opponent | Rank | Site/stadium | Score | Win | Loss | Save | TV | Attendance | Overall record | SLC Record |
|---|---|---|---|---|---|---|---|---|---|---|---|
| May 3 | at Houston Christian | | Husky Field • Houston, TX | 3–4 | Castano, Louis (5-1) | **Watkins, Preston (1-2)** | None | ESPN+ | 372 | 16–28 | 8–18 |
| May 3 | at Houston Christian | | Husky Field • Houston, TX | 5–1 | **Dean, David (2-4)** | Caravalho, Joshua (8-3) | **Molina, Matthew (2)** | ESPN+ | 372 | 17–28 | 9–18 |
| May 4 | at Houston Christian | | Husky Field • Houston, TX | 0–2 | Smith, Ben (4-5) | **Shea, Bryson (1-5)** | Cyr, Jacob (1) | ESPN+ | 298 | 17–29 | 9–19 |
| May 9 | New Orleans | | Chapman Field • Corpus Christi, TX | 4–2 | **Burdick, Gage (4-3)** | Edwards, Grant (3-4) | **Molina, Matthew (3)** | | 187 | 18–29 | 10–18 |
| May 10 | New Orleans | | Chapman Field • Corpus Christi, TX | 11–5 | **Garcia, Zach (6-4)** | Longshore, Zach (1-5) | None | | 347 | 19–29 | 11–18 |
| May 11 | New Orleans | | Chapman Field • Corpus Christi, TX | 5–4 | **Soliz, Cam (2-3)** | Calloway, Bryce (2-2) | **Molina, Matthew (4)** | | 323 | 20–29 | 12–18 |

Postseason (1–2)

Southland Tournament (Edinburg Bracket) (1–2)
| Date | Opponent | (Seed)/Rank | Site/stadium | Score | Win | Loss | Save | TV | Attendance | Overall record | Tournament record |
|---|---|---|---|---|---|---|---|---|---|---|---|
| May 15 | at (2) UT Rio Grande Valley | (7) | UTRGV Baseball Stadium • Edinburg, TX | 8–11 | Oliva, Steven (2-2) | **Dean, David (2-5)** | None | ESPN+ | 3,215 | 20–30 | 0–1 |
| May 15 | vs (3) Lamar | (7) | UTRGV Baseball Stadium • Edinburg, TX | 12–5 | **Garcia, Zach (7-4)** | Olivier, Chris (6-3)) | **Soliz, Cam (4)** | ESPN+ | 185 | 21–30 | 1–1 |
| May 15 | at (2) UT Rio Grande Valley | (7) | UTRGV Baseball Stadium • Edinburg, TX | 4–10 | Oliva, Steven (3-2) | **Molina, Matthew (0-2)** | None | ESPN+ | | 21–31 | 1–2 |

Legend: = Win = Loss = Canceled
Bold = Texas A&M–Corpus Christi team member
Rankings are based on the team's current ranking in the D1Baseball poll.

Schedule source:
