= 2025 Northwestern State Demons baseball team =

American college baseball season

2025 Northwestern State Demons baseball
- Conference: Southland Conference
- Record: 35–21 (19–11 Southland)
- Head coach: Chris Bertrand (2nd season)
- Assistant coaches: Dyland Berlanger; Billy Henley; Dan Hlad
- Home stadium: H. Alvin Brown–C. C. Stroud Field

2025 Southland Conference baseball standings
	Conf.				Overall
Team	W		L	PCT	W		L	PCT
Southeastern Louisiana ‍†‍‍	22	–	8	.733	38	–	16	.704
UT Rio Grande Valley ‍†‍‍	22	–	8	.733	36	–	18	.667
Lamar ‍‍‍	20	–	10	.667	40	–	17	.702
McNeese ‍‍‍	19	–	11	.633	31	–	17	.646
Northwestern State ‍‍‍	19	–	11	.633	35	–	21	.625
Houston Christian ‍‍‡‍^{y}	17	–	13	.567	32	–	25	.561
New Orleans ‍‍‍	12	–	18	.400	28	–	26	.519
Texas A&M–Corpus Christi ‍‍‍	12	–	18	.400	21	–	31	.404
Nicholls ‍‍‍	10	–	20	.333	17	–	32	.347
Stephen F. Austin ‍‍‍	9	–	21	.300	18	–	31	.367
Incarnate Word ‍‍‍	3	–	27	.100	17	–	33	.340
† – Conference champion ‡ – Tournament champion y – Invited to the NCAA Tournament; As of May 31, 2025; Rankings from D1Baseball

The 2025 Northwestern State Demons baseball team represented Northwestern State University during the 2025 NCAA Division I baseball season. The Demons played their home games at H. Alvin Brown–C. C. Stroud Field and were led by second–year head coach Chris Bertrand. They are members of the Southland Conference. Northwestern State compiled a 35–21 overall record and a 19–11 conference record. The Demons' season ended with a 2–2 record in the 2025 SLC tournament.

== Preseason ==
=== Southland Conference Coaches Poll ===
The Southland Conference Coaches Poll was released on February 6, 2025. Northwestern State was picked to finish eighth in the Southland Conference with 89 overall votes.

Coaches poll
Predicted finish	Team	Votes (1st place)
1	Lamar	197 (18)
2	Southeastern Louisiana	146 (4)
3	McNeese	145
4	UT Rio Grande Valley	144
5	Nicholls	129
6	New Orleans	128
7	Incarnate Word	95
8	Northwestern State	89
9	Texas A&M–Corpus Christi	73
10	Houston Christian	37
11	Stephen F. Austin	27

=== Preseason All-Southland team ===
Rocco Gump and Reese Lipoma were named to the conference preseason first team. Balin Valentine and Tyler Bryan were named to the conference preseason second team.

==== First Team ====
- Zak Skinner* (LU, JR, Catcher)
- Brayden Evans* (LU, JR, 1st Base)
- Isaac Webb* (TAMU, SR, 2nd Base)
- TJ Salvaggio (SELU, SR, Shortstop)
- Rocco Gump (NWST, SR, 3rd Base)
- Reese Lipoma* (NWST, RSR, Outfielder)
- Connor Westenburg (McN, SR, Outfielder)
- Cole Stromboe+ (SELU, RSR, Outfielder)
- Tristian Moore+ (UNO, RSR, Outfielder)
- Bryce Calloway* (UNO, SR, Utility)
- Rey Mendoza (UIW, GR, Designated Hitter)
- Brennan Stuprich* (SELU, RSR, Starting Pitcher)
- Josh Salinas (UIW, GR, Starting Pitcher)
- Zach Garcia (TAMU, SR, Starting Pitcher)
- Kyle Moseley (LU, SR, Relief Pitcher)

*-2024 Southland All-Conference Selection
+-Tie for final spot

==== Second Team ====
- Steven Lancia (UTRGV, SR, Catcher)
- Martin Vazquez (UTRGV, SR, 1st Base)
- Diego Villsecas* (UNO, SR, 2nd Base)
- Isaac Lopez (UTRGV, GR, Shortstop)
- Easton Moomau+ (UTRGV, SO, 3rd Base)
- Matt Ryan+ (LU, SR, 3rd Base)
- Balin Valentine (NWST, SR, Outfielder)
- Parker Coley (SELU, SR, Outfielder)
- Jude Hall (SELU, SR, Outfielder)
- Simon Larranaga (MCN, SR, Utility)
- Armani Raygoza (UTRGV, RSO, Designated Hitter)
- Parker Edwards (HCU, SR, Starting Pitcher)
- Angelo Cabral (UTRGV, GR, Starting Pitcher)
- Tyler Bryan (NWST, JR, Starting Pitcher)
- Larson Fabre (SELU, JR, Relief Pitcher)

*-2024 Southland All-Conference Selection
+-Tie for final spot

== Schedule and results ==
Legend
	Northwestern State win
	Northwestern State loss
	Postponement/Cancelation/Suspensions
**Bold**	Northwestern State team member
*	Non-Conference game
†	Make-Up Game

2025 Northwestern State Demons baseball game log (35–21)
Regular season (33–19)

February (4–5)
Date	Opponent	Rank	Site/stadium	Score	Win	Loss	Save	TV	Attendance	Overall record	SLC Record
Feb. 14	Central Arkansas*		H. Alvin Brown–C. C. Stroud Field • Natchitoches, LA	2–6	CHRISTENSEN, Charlie (1–0)	**Marionneaux, Dylan (0–1)**	None	ESPN+	401	0–1	
Feb. 15	Central Arkansas*		H. Alvin Brown–C. C. Stroud Field • Natchitoches, LA	16–6^{8}	**White, Carter (1–0)**	COLLINS, Tate (0–1)	None	ESPN+	590	1–1	
Feb. 16	Central Arkansas*		H. Alvin Brown–C. C. Stroud Field • Natchitoches, LA	11–3	**Hillen, Trent (1–0)**	MACRAE, Coleman (0–1)	None	ESPN+	585	2–1	
Feb. 19	at Louisiana–Monroe*		Lou St. Amant Field • Monroe, LA				**Postponed to April 8 due to inclement weather**				
Feb. 21	at No. 24 Troy*		Riddle–Pace Field • Troy, AL	1–7	GAINOUS, Garrett (1–0)	**Marionneaux, Dylan (0–2)**	None	ESPN+	1,928	2–2	
Feb. 22	at No. 24 Troy*		Riddle–Pace Field • Troy, AL	12–14	Edders, Noah (2–0)	**Bryan, Tyler (0–1)**	Gorgen, Grady (1)		2,012	2–3	
Feb. 23	at No. 24 Troy*		Riddle–Pace Field • Troy, AL	4–14	Nelson, Drew (1–0)	**Hillen, Trent (0–1)**	None	ESPN+	1,837	2–4	
Feb. 25	Southern–New Orleans*		H. Alvin Brown–C. C. Stroud Field • Natchitoches, LA	14–3^{7}	**Robinson, Kevin (1-0)**	Green, Christopher (0-1)	None	ESPN+	437	3–4	
Feb. 26	Alcorn State*		H. Alvin Brown–C. C. Stroud Field • Natchitoches, LA	10–5	**Alexis, Adam (1-0)**	Nailer,Jacobe (0-1)	None	ESPN+	426	4–4	
Feb. 28	at Southeastern Louisiana		Pat Kenelly Diamond at Alumni Field • Hammond, LA	2–6	Stuprich, Brennan (3-0)	**White, Carter (1-1)**	None	ESPN+	1,264	4–5	0–1

March (14–4)
Date	Opponent	Rank	Site/stadium	Score	Win	Loss	Save	TV	Attendance	Overall record	SLC Record
Mar 1	at Southeastern Louisiana		Pat Kenelly Diamond at Alumni Field • Hammond, LA	3–7	Ambrose, Chase (1-0)	**Leonard, Bryce (0-1)**	Gisclair, Nick (1)	ESPN+	1,264	4–6	0–2
Mar 2	at Southeastern Louisiana		Pat Kenelly Diamond at Alumni Field • Hammond, LA	5–6	St. Pierre, Brady (1-0)	**Bivins, Conner (0-1)**	None	ESPN+	1,349	4–7	0–3
Mar 4	LeTourneau*		H. Alvin Brown–C. C. Stroud Field • Natchitoches, LA	18–1^{7}	**Robinson, Kevin (2-0)**	Lane Holman (1-1)	None	ESPN+	350	5–7	
Mar 7	Incarnate Word		H. Alvin Brown–C. C. Stroud Field • Natchitoches, LA	5–4^{10}	**Leonard, Bryce (1-1)**	Pillot, Braelin (0-1)	None	ESPN+	505	6–7	1–3
Mar 8	Incarnate Word		H. Alvin Brown–C. C. Stroud Field • Natchitoches, LA	12–4	**Bryan, Tyler (1-1)**	Garcia, EJ (2-2)	None	ESPN+	387	7–7	2–3
Mar 9	Incarnate Word		H. Alvin Brown–C. C. Stroud Field • Natchitoches, LA	5–4	**Hillen, Trent (2-1)**	Elizondo, Jackson (1-2)	None	ESPN+		8–7	3–3
Mar 11	Grambling*		H. Alvin Brown–C. C. Stroud Field • Natchitoches, LA	11–1^{7}	**Robinson, Kevin (3-0)**	Nick Robinson (0-2)	None		305	9–7	
Mar 14	at Texas A&M–Corpus Christi		Chapman Field • Corpus Christi, TX	5–0	**Marionneaux, Dylan (1-2)**	Garcia, Zach (2-2)	None	ESPN+	447	10–7	4–3
Mar 15	at Texas A&M–Corpus Christi		Chapman Field • Corpus Christi, TX	2–5	Burdick, G (1-1)	**Bryan, Tyler (1-2)**	None	ESPN+	469	10–8	4–4
Mar 16	at Texas A&M–Corpus Christi		Chapman Field • Corpus Christi, TX	8–0	**Hillen, Trent (3-1)**	Smith, E (0-1)	None	ESPN+	422	11–8	5–4
Mar 18	at Grambling*		Wilbert Ellis Field at Ralph Waldo Emerson Jones Park • Grambling, LA	12–9	**Robinson, Kevin (4-0)**	Nick Robinson (0-3)	None		75	12–8	
Mar 21	at New Orleans		Maestri Field at Privateer Park • New Orleans, LA	1–0	**Marionneaux, Dylan (2-2)**	Edwards, Grant (0-2)	None	ESPN+	389	13–8	6–4
Mar 22	at New Orleans		Maestri Field at Privateer Park • New Orleans, LA	1–3	Syversen, Cole (3-0)	**Bryan, Tyler (1-3)**	Calloway, Bryce (5)	ESPN+	311	13–9	6–5
Mar 23	at New Orleans		Maestri Field at Privateer Park • New Orleans, LA	10–9	**Leonard, Bryce (2-1)**	Usey, Trey (0-1)	None	ESPN+	387	14–9	7–5
Mar 25	Centenary*		H. Alvin Brown–C. C. Stroud Field • Natchitoches, LA	11–1^{7}	**Robinson, Kevin (5-0)**	Ardoin, Roman (1-3)	None	ESPN+	576	15–9	
Mar 28	Nicholls		H. Alvin Brown–C. C. Stroud Field • Natchitoches, LA	9–4	**Marionneaux, Dylan (3-2)**	Parache, Nuno (1-1)	**White, Carter (1)**	ESPN+		16–9	8–5
Mar 29	Nicholls		H. Alvin Brown–C. C. Stroud Field • Natchitoches, LA	9–5	**Marien, Wesley (1-0)**	Jordan, Harper (3-3)	**Fiveash, Caden (1)**	ESPN+	803	17–9	9–5
Mar 30	Nicholls		H. Alvin Brown–C. C. Stroud Field • Natchitoches, LA	6–2	**Hillen, Trent (4-1)**	Lindsey, Michael (0-3)	None	ESPN+	816	18–9	10–5

April (10–9)
Date	Opponent	Rank	Site/stadium	Score	Win	Loss	Save	TV	Attendance	Overall record	SLC Record
Apr 1	at Louisiana*		M. L. Tigue Moore Field at Russo Park • Lafayette, LA	7–9	Tate Hess (3-2)	**Robinson, Kevin (5-1)**	Wil Taylor (2)	ESPN+	2,569	18–10	
Apr 2	at Tulane*		Greer Field at Turchin Stadium • New Orleans, LA	4–8	Michael Lombardi (1-0)	**Carter, Brandon (0-1)**	None	ESPN+	1,478	18–11	
Apr 4	UT Rio Grande Valley		H. Alvin Brown–C. C. Stroud Field • Natchitoches, LA	7–6	**Anderson, Austin (1-0)**	Nolan, Nick (0-1)	None	ESPN+	832	19–11	11–5
Apr 5	UT Rio Grande Valley		H. Alvin Brown–C. C. Stroud Field • Natchitoches, LA	5–8	Wiatrek, Wyatt (5-0)	**Bryan, Tyler (1-4)**	Thayer, Harrison (3)	ESPN+		19–12	11–6
Apr 6	UT Rio Grande Valley		H. Alvin Brown–C. C. Stroud Field • Natchitoches, LA	8–5	**White, Carter (2-1)**	Bonilla, Robert (1-2)	**Leonard, Bryce (1)**	ESPN+	512	20–12	12–6
Apr 8	at Louisiana–Monroe*		Lou St. Amant Field • Monroe, LA	5–6	Gregoire, Josh (1-1)	**Leonard, Bryce (2-2)**	None		940	20–13	
Apr 9	Louisiana–Monroe*		H. Alvin Brown–C. C. Stroud Field • Natchitoches, LA	2–5	Hess, H (1-0)	**McCoy, Kaden (0-1)**	Grigg, L (1)	ESPN+	506	20–14	
Apr 11	at Houston Christian		Husky Field • Houston, TX	10–17	Castano, Louis (4-0)	**Marionneaux, Dylan (3-3)**	None		411	20–15	12–7
Apr 12	at Houston Christian		Husky Field • Houston, TX	2–5	Caravalho, Joshua (7-1)	**Bryan, Tyler (1-5)**	Norton, Ben (5)		174	20–16	12–8
Apr 13	at Houston Christian		Husky Field • Houston, TX	10–5	**Hillen, Trent (5-1)**	Smith, Ben (3-3)	**Marien, Wesley (1)**		321	21–16	13–8
Apr 15	LSU–Alexandria*		H. Alvin Brown–C. C. Stroud Field • Natchitoches, LA	3–0	**Robinson, Kevin (6-1)**	Foote, Blaise (0-0)	**Leonard, Bryce (2)**	ESPN+	507	22–16	
Apr 17	Lamar		H. Alvin Brown–C. C. Stroud Field • Natchitoches, LA	2–8	Olivier, Chris (5-1)	**Marionneaux, Dylan (3-4)**	Havard, Peyton (4)	ESPN+	764	22–17	13–9
Apr 18	Lamar		H. Alvin Brown–C. C. Stroud Field • Natchitoches, LA	2–1^{10}	**Anderson, Austin (2-0)**	Neal, Austin (1-1)	None	ESPN+	804	23–17	14–9
Apr 19	Lamar		H. Alvin Brown–C. C. Stroud Field • Natchitoches, LA	7–3	**Hillen, Trent (6-1)**	Sutton, Carter (5-1)	**Marien, Wesley (2)**	ESPN+	634	24–17	15–9
Apr 22	at No. 7 LSU*		Alex Box Stadium, Skip Bertman Field • Baton Rouge, LA	13–3^{7}	**Leonard, Bryce (3-2)**	Williams, Cooper (0-1)	None	SECN+	10,634	25–17	
Apr 23	Mississippi Valley State*		H. Alvin Brown–C. C. Stroud Field • Natchitoches, LA				**Canceled due to inclement weather**	ESPN+			
Apr 25	at Stephen F. Austin		Jaycees Field • Nacogdoches, TX	12–2	**White, Carter (3-1)**	Mulcahy, Dylan (1-3)	None	ESPN+	144	26–17	16–9
Apr 26	at Stephen F. Austin		Jaycees Field • Nacogdoches, TX	1–8	Templeton, Cody (4-4)	**Bryan, Tyler (1-6)**	None	ESPN+	164	26–18	16–10
Apr 27	at Stephen F. Austin		Jaycees Field • Nacogdoches, TX	7–5	**Anderson, Austin (3-0)**	Balmaceda, Elian (0-5)	None	ESPN+	168	27–18	17–10
Apr 29	at Louisiana–Monroe*		Lou St. Amant Field • Monroe, LA	9–8	**Alexis, Adam (2-0)**	Huff, Hollis (0-1)	**LeBlanc, Jacob (1)**	ESPN+	1,050	28–18	

May (5–1)
Date	Opponent	Rank	Site/stadium	Score	Win	Loss	Save	TV	Attendance	Overall record	SLC Record
May 2	at Pepperdine*		Eddy D. Field Stadium • Malibu, CA	5–1	**Leonard, Bryce (4-2)**	Scavone, Tommy (1-5)	**Marien, Wesley (3)**	ESPN+	220	29–18	
May 3	at Pepperdine*		Eddy D. Field Stadium • Malibu, CA	10–5	**Bryan, Tyler (2-6)**	Plisinski, Austin (0-2)	None	ESPN+	287	30–18	
May 4	at Pepperdine*		Eddy D. Field Stadium • Malibu, CA	15–12	**Fiveash, Caden (1-0)**	Nichol, Wyatt (0-1)	**Anderson, Austin (1)**	ESPN+	373	31–18	
May 8	McNeese		H. Alvin Brown–C. C. Stroud Field • Natchitoches, LA	5–2	**White, Carter (4-1)**	Golden, Cooper (3-3)	**Marionneaux, Dylan (1)**	ESPN+	751	32–18	18–10
May 9	McNeese		H. Alvin Brown–C. C. Stroud Field • Natchitoches, LA	6–7	Eric Nachtsheim (2-0)	**Fiveash, Caden (1-1)**	None	ESPN+	864	32–19	18–11
May 10	McNeese		H. Alvin Brown–C. C. Stroud Field • Natchitoches, LA	7–6	**Hillen, Trent (7-1)**	Diego Corrales (0-3)	**Anderson, Austin (2)**	ESPN+	987	33–19	19–11

Postseason (2–2)

Southland Tournament (Hammond Bracket) (2–2)
Date	Opponent	(Seed)/Rank	Site/stadium	Score	Win	Loss	Save	TV	Attendance	Overall record	Tournament record
May 15	vs. (5) McNeese	(4)	Pat Kenelly Diamond at Alumni Field • Hammond, LA	7–6	**Marionneaux, Dylan (4-4)**	Alexis Gravel (4-3)	None	ESPN+	600	34–19	1–0
May 16	vs. (5) New Orleans	(8)	Pat Kenelly Diamond at Alumni Field • Hammond, LA	2–3	O'Dell, Hayden (3-0)	**Bryan, Tyler (2-7)**	Calloway, Bryce (10)	ESPN+	625	34–20	1–1
May 17	vs. (5) Southeastern Louisiana	(1)	Pat Kenelly Diamond at Alumni Field • Hammond, LA	11–8	**Talley, Corbin (1-0)**	Howell, Kaleb (0-1)	None	ESPN+	1,125	35–20	2–1
May 17	vs. (5) New Orleans	(8)	Pat Kenelly Diamond at Alumni Field • Hammond, LA	11–12	Kimball, Carson (2-1)	**Anderson, Austin (3-1)**	Calloway, Bryce (11)	ESPN+	901	35–21	2–2

Legend: = Win = Loss = Canceled
Bold = Northwestern State team member
Rankings are based on the team's current ranking in the D1Baseball poll.

Schedule source:
