= 2025 UT Rio Grande Valley Vaqueros baseball team =

American college baseball season

2025 UT Rio Grande Valley Vaqueros baseball
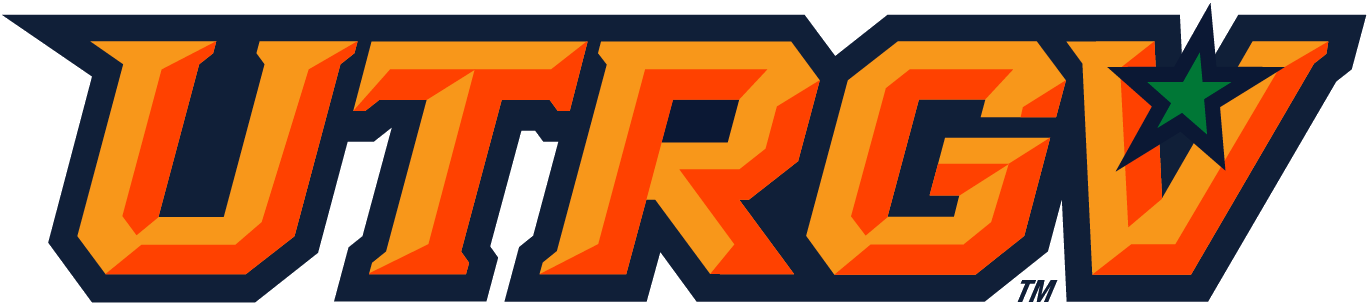

Southland Conference regular season co–champions
- Conference: Southland Conference
- Record: 36–18 (22–8 Southland)
- Head coach: Derek Matlock (8th season)
- Assistant coaches: Rob Martinez; Ryan Jackson; Taylor Steen
- Home stadium: UTRGV Baseball Stadium

2025 Southland Conference baseball standings
	Conf.				Overall
Team	W		L	PCT	W		L	PCT
Southeastern Louisiana ‍†‍‍	22	–	8	.733	38	–	16	.704
UT Rio Grande Valley ‍†‍‍	22	–	8	.733	36	–	18	.667
Lamar ‍‍‍	20	–	10	.667	40	–	17	.702
McNeese ‍‍‍	19	–	11	.633	31	–	17	.646
Northwestern State ‍‍‍	19	–	11	.633	35	–	21	.625
Houston Christian ‍‍‡‍^{y}	17	–	13	.567	32	–	25	.561
New Orleans ‍‍‍	12	–	18	.400	28	–	26	.519
Texas A&M–Corpus Christi ‍‍‍	12	–	18	.400	21	–	31	.404
Nicholls ‍‍‍	10	–	20	.333	17	–	32	.347
Stephen F. Austin ‍‍‍	9	–	21	.300	18	–	31	.367
Incarnate Word ‍‍‍	3	–	27	.100	17	–	33	.340
† – Conference champion ‡ – Tournament champion y – Invited to the NCAA Tournament; As of May 31, 2025; Rankings from D1Baseball

The 2025 UT Rio Grande Valley Vaqueros baseball team represented University of Texas Rio Grande Valley during the 2025 NCAA Division I baseball season. The Vaqueros played their home games at UTRGV Baseball Stadium and were led by eighth–year head coach Derek Matlock. The 2025 season was the Vaqueros' first season as members of the Southland Conference. They compiled a 38–16 overall record and a 22–8 conference record earning the 2025 Southland Conference baseball co–championship. The Vaqueros' season ended with a 2–2 record in the 2025 SLC tournament.

== Preseason ==
=== Southland Conference Coaches Poll ===
The Southland Conference Coaches Poll was released on February 6, 2025. UT Rio Grande Valley was picked to finish fourth in the Southland Conference with 144 overall votes.

Coaches poll
Predicted finish	Team	Votes (1st place)
1	Lamar	197 (18)
2	Southeastern Louisiana	146 (4)
3	McNeese	145
4	UT Rio Grande Valley	144
5	Nicholls	129
6	New Orleans	128
7	Incarnate Word	95
8	Northwestern State	89
9	Texas A&M–Corpus Christi	73
10	Houston Christian	37
11	Stephen F. Austin	27

=== Preseason All-Southland team ===
No Vaqueros were named to the conference preseason first team. Steven Lancia, Martin Vazquez, Isaac Lopez, Easton Moomau, Armani Raygoza, and Angelo Cabral were named to the conference preseason second team.

==== First Team ====
- Zak Skinner* (LU, JR, Catcher)
- Brayden Evans* (LU, JR, 1st Base)
- Isaac Webb* (TAMU, SR, 2nd Base)
- TJ Salvaggio (SELU, SR, Shortstop)
- Rocco Gump (NWST, SR, 3rd Base)
- Reese Lipoma* (NWST, RSR, Outfielder)
- Connor Westenburg (MCN, SR, Outfielder)
- Cole Stromboe+ (SELU, RSR, Outfielder)
- Tristian Moore+ (UNO, RSR, Outfielder)
- Bryce Calloway* (UNO, SR, Utility)
- Rey Mendoza (UIW, GR, Designated Hitter)
- Brennan Stuprich* (SELU, RSR, Starting Pitcher)
- Josh Salinas (UIW, GR, Starting Pitcher)
- Zach Garcia (TAMU, SR, Starting Pitcher)
- Kyle Moseley (LU, SR, Relief Pitcher)

*-2024 Southland All-Conference Selection
+-Tie for final spot

==== Second Team ====
- Steven Lancia (UTRGV, SR, Catcher)
- Martin Vazquez (UTRGV, SR, 1st Base)
- Diego Villsecas* (UNO, SR, 2nd Base)
- Isaac Lopez (UTRGV, GR, Shortstop)
- Easton Moomau+ (UTRGV, SO, 3rd Base)
- Matt Ryan+ (LU, SR, 3rd Base)
- Balin Valentine (NWST, SR, Outfielder)
- Parker Coley (SELU, SR, Outfielder)
- Jude Hall (SELU, SR, Outfielder)
- Simon Larranaga (MCN, SR, Utility)
- Armani Raygoza (UTRGV, RSO, Designated Hitter)
- Parker Edwards (HCU, SR, Starting Pitcher)
- Angelo Cabral (UTRGV, GR, Starting Pitcher)
- Tyler Bryan (NWST, JR, Starting Pitcher)
- Larson Fabre (SELU, JR, Relief Pitcher)

*-2024 Southland All-Conference Selection
+-Tie for final spot

== Schedule and results ==
Legend
	UT Rio Grande Valley win
	UT Rio Grande Valley loss
	Postponement/Cancelation/Suspensions
**Bold**	UT Rio Grande Valley team member
*	Non-Conference game
†	Make-Up Game

2025 UT Rio Grande Valley Vaqueros baseball game log (36–18)
Regular season (34–16)

February (5–2)
Date	Opponent	Rank	Site/stadium	Score	Win	Loss	Save	TV	Attendance	Overall record	SLC Record
Al Ogletree Classic
Feb. 14	Southern Illinois*		UTRGV Baseball Stadium • Edinburg, TX	8–4	**Wiatrek, Wyatt (1-0)**	Jordan Huskey (0-1)	None	ESPN+	3,937	1–0	
Feb. 15	Southern Illinois*		UTRGV Baseball Stadium • Edinburg, TX	2–7	Alec Nigut (1-0)	**Loa, Víctor (0-1)**	None	ESPN+	2,287	1–1	
Feb. 16	Southern Illinois*		UTRGV Baseball Stadium • Edinburg, TX	3–2	**Thayer, Harrison (1-0)**	Meade Johnson (0-1)	**Oliva, Steven (1)**	ESPN+	1,087	2–1	
Feb. 18	#20 Dallas Baptist*		Horner Ballpark • Dallas, TX	15–5	**Tejada, Anthony (1-0)**	PETERS, Mason (0-1)	None	ESPN+	374	3–1	
Feb. 22	North Dakota State*		UTRGV Baseball Stadium • Edinburg, TX				**Cancelled (Weather)**				
Feb. 23	North Dakota State*		UTRGV Baseball Stadium • Edinburg, TX	10–3	**Loa, Víctor (1-1)**	Nolan Johnson (0-2)	None	ESPN+		4–1	
Feb. 23	North Dakota State*		UTRGV Baseball Stadium • Edinburg, TX	5–7	Skyler Riedinger (1-0)	**Oliva, Steven (0-1)**	None	ESPN+	1,173	4–2	
Feb. 28	Lamar		UTRGV Baseball Stadium • Edinburg, TX	13–3^{7}	**Cabral, Angelo (1-0)**	Havard, Peyton (1-1)	None	ESPN+	3,111	5–2	1–0

March (14–6)
Date	Opponent	Rank	Site/stadium	Score	Win	Loss	Save	TV	Attendance	Overall record	SLC Record
Mar 1	Lamar		UTRGV Baseball Stadium • Edinburg, TX	2–0	**Loa, Víctor (2-1)**	Hunsaker, Riely (1-1)	**Thayer, Harrison (1)**	ESPN+	3,345	6–2	2–0
Mar 2	Lamar		UTRGV Baseball Stadium • Edinburg, TX	5–2	**Hernandez, Francisco (1-0)**	Moseley, Kyle (0-1)	**Oliva, Steven (2)**	ESPN+	1,519	7–2	3–0
Mar 4	at Houston*		Schroeder Park • Houston, TX	9–5	**Henderson, Rex (1-0)**	Roman, Richie (0-1)	None	ESPN+	824	8–2	
Mar 7	at New Orleans		Maestri Field at Privateer Park • New Orleans, LA	10–5	**Wiatrek, Wyatt (2-0)**	Toney, Sawyer (1-1)	None	ESPN+	355	9–2	4–0
Mar 8	at New Orleans		Maestri Field at Privateer Park • New Orleans, LA	14–8	**Loa, Víctor (3-1)**	Longshore, Zach (0-3)	None	ESPN+	377	10–2	5–0
Mar 9	at New Orleans		Maestri Field at Privateer Park • New Orleans, LA	9–2	**Limas, Jacob (1-0)**	Bienvenu, Matthew (0-1)	None	ESPN+	345	11–2	6–0
Mar 11	at No. 22 Southern Miss*		Pete Taylor Park • Hattiesburg, MS	1–3	Adams, Matthew (2-1)	**Hernandez, Francisco** (1-1)	Allen (4)	ESPN+	5,231	11–3	
Mar 14	Nicholls		UTRGV Baseball Stadium • Edinburg, TX	13–2^{7}	**Wiatrek, Wyatt (3-0)**	Lindsey, Michael (0-2)	None	ESPN+	2,485	12–3	7–0
Mar 15	Nicholls		UTRGV Baseball Stadium • Edinburg, TX	10–9^{13}	**Bonilla, Robert (1-0)**	Simoneaux, Cole (0-1)	None	ESPN+	4,352	13–3	8–0
Mar 16	Nicholls		UTRGV Baseball Stadium • Edinburg, TX	14–5	**Wanless, Caden (1-0)**	Fields, Nick (0-1)	None	ESPN+	1,166	14–3	9–0
Mar 18	Texas Southern*		UTRGV Baseball Stadium • Edinburg, TX	10–0^{7}	**Cabral, Angelo (2-0)**	Kameron Walton (0-1)	None	ESPN+	5,111	15–3	
Mar 19	Texas Southern*		UTRGV Baseball Stadium • Edinburg, TX	9–0	**Barrera, Daren (1-0)**	Justin Mayes (0-3)	None	ESPN+	2,381	16–3	
Mar 21	Houston Christian		UTRGV Baseball Stadium • Edinburg, TX	3–6	Edwards, Parker (1-1)	**Lopez, Jack (0-1)**	Norton, Ben (3)	ESPN+	3,334	16–4	9–1
Mar 22	Houston Christian		UTRGV Baseball Stadium • Edinburg, TX	15–0^{7}	**Loa, Víctor (4-1)**	Caravalho, Joshua (5-1)	None	ESPN+	6,324	17–4	10 –1
Mar 23	Houston Christian		UTRGV Baseball Stadium • Edinburg, TX	9–12	Smith, Ben (2-2)	**Limas, Jacob (1-1)**	None	ESPN+	1,371	17–5	10–2
Mar 25	at TCU*		Lupton Stadium • Fort Worth, TX	4–3	Baumler, Trever (2-2)	**Maldonado, Evan (0-1)**	Shinn, Gianluca (1)	ESPN+	3,807	17–6	
Mar 26	at TCU*		Lupton Stadium • Fort Worth, TX	0–4	James, Zack (3-0)	**Bonilla, Robert (1-1**)	None	ESPN+	4,012	17–7	
South Texas Showdown
Mar 28	at Texas A&M–Corpus Christi		Chapman Field • Corpus Christi, TX				**Postponed due to inclement weather**				
Mar 29	at Texas A&M–Corpus Christi		Chapman Field • Corpus Christi, TX	3–2	**Cabral, Angelo (3-0)**	Burdick, Gage (1-2)	**Oliva, Steven (3)**	ESPN+	862	18–7	11–2
Mar 29	at Texas A&M–Corpus Christi		Chapman Field • Corpus Christi, TX	11–8	**Wiatrek, Wyatt (4-0)**	Dean, David (1-2)	Nolan, Nick (1)	ESPN+	875	19–7	12–2
Mar 30	at Texas A&M–Corpus Christi		Chapman Field • Corpus Christi, TX	2–3	Burdick, Gage (2-2)	**Thayer, Harrison (1-1)**	None	ESPN+	467	19–8	12–3

April (12–7)
Date	Opponent	Rank	Site/stadium	Score	Win	Loss	Save	TV	Attendance	Overall record	SLC Record
Apr 2	at Rice*		Reckling Park • Houston, TX	20–5^{7}	**Cienfuegos, Kike (1-0)**	Baker, Von (0-1)	None	ESPN+	1,551	20–8	
Apr 4	at Northwestern State		H. Alvin Brown–C. C. Stroud Field • Natchitoches, LA	6–7	Anderson, Austin (1-0)	**Nolan, Nick (0-1)**	None	ESPN+	832	20–9	12–4
Apr 5	at Northwestern State		H. Alvin Brown–C. C. Stroud Field • Natchitoches, LA	8–5	**Wiatrek, Wyatt (5-0)**	Bryan, Tyler (1-4)	**Thayer, Harrison (3)**	ESPN+		21–9	13–4
Apr 6	at Northwestern State		H. Alvin Brown–C. C. Stroud Field • Natchitoches, LA	8–5	White, Carter (2-1)	**Bonilla, Robert (1-2)**	Leonard, Bryce (1)	ESPN+	512	21–10	13–5
Apr 8	at Louisiana*		M. L. Tigue Moore Field at Russo Park • Lafayette, LA	9–7	**Tejada, Anthony (2-0)**	Wil Taylor (0-1)	**Oliva, Steven (4)**	ESPN+	3,803	22–10	
Apr 11	Stephen F. Austin		UTRGV Baseball Stadium • Edinburg, TX	7–2	**Cabral, Angelo (4-0)**	Cody Templeton (3-3)	**Lopez, Jack (1)**	ESPN+	2,057	23–10	14–5
Apr 12	Stephen F. Austin		UTRGV Baseball Stadium • Edinburg, TX	9–7	**Thayer, Harrison (2-1)**	Dylan Mulcahy (1-2)	**Oliva, Steven (5)**	ESPN+	6,537	24–10	15–5
Apr 13	Stephen F. Austin		UTRGV Baseball Stadium • Edinburg, TX	12–2^{7}	**Loa, Víctor (5-1)**	Garrett Landry (0-2)	None	ESPN+	1,243	25–10	16–5
Apr 15	#1 Texas*		UFCU Disch–Falk Field • Austin, TX	4–11	Bing, Kade (2-0)	**Limas, Jacob (1-2)**	None	ESPN+	7,163	25–11	
Apr 17	at Southeastern Louisiana		Pat Kenelly Diamond at Alumni Field • Hammond, LA	2–5	Stuprich, Brennan (8-2)	**Oliva, Steven (0-2)**	St. Pierre, Brady (7)	ESPN+	1,114	25–12	16–6
Apr 18	at Southeastern Louisiana		Pat Kenelly Diamond at Alumni Field • Hammond, LA	1–12^{7}	Lirette, Luke (4-1)	**Cabral, Angelo (4-1)**	None	ESPN+	1,265	25–13	16–7
Apr 19	at Southeastern Louisiana		Pat Kenelly Diamond at Alumni Field • Hammond, LA	8–5	**Wiatrek, Wyatt (6-0)**	Vosburg, Aiden (2-2)	**Tejada, Anthony (1)**	ESPN+	1,055	26–13	17–7
Apr 22	Incarnate Word*		UTRGV Baseball Stadium • Edinburg, TX	2–10	Garcia, EJ (4-4)	**Thayer, Harrison (2-2)**	None	ESPN+	4,408	26–14	
Apr 25	McNeese		UTRGV Baseball Stadium • Edinburg, TX	6–9^{10}	Sergio Lopez (6-1)	**Tejada, Anthony (2-1)**	None	ESPN+	4,025	26–15	17–8
Apr 26	McNeese		UTRGV Baseball Stadium • Edinburg, TX	9–5	**Nolan, Nick (1-1)**	Parker Primeaux (2-1)	None	ESPN+	4,589	27–15	18–8
Apr 27	McNeese		UTRGV Baseball Stadium • Edinburg, TX	5–3	**Thayer, Harrison (3-2**)	Jake Blackwell (3-2)	None	ESPN+	1,134	28–15	19–8
Apr 29	at Texas Tech*		Dan Law Field at Rip Griffin Park • Lubbock, TX	13–4	**Nolan, Nick (2-1)**	Mohan, Connor (1-2)	**Oliva, Steven (6)**	ESPN+	3,181	29–15	
Apr 30	at Texas Tech*		Dan Law Field at Rip Griffin Park • Lubbock, TX	7–4	**Lopez, Jack (1-1)**	Crotchfelt (2-3)	**Thayer, Harrison (4)**	ESPN+	3,298	30–15	

May (4–1)
Date	Opponent	Rank	Site/stadium	Score	Win	Loss	Save	TV	Attendance	Overall record	SLC Record
May 2	at Incarnate Word		Sullivan Field • San Antonio, TX	14–10	**Cienfuegos, Kike (2-0)**	Garcia, EJ (4-5)	None	ESPN+	287	31–15	20–8
May 3	at Incarnate Word		Sullivan Field • San Antonio, TX	13–10	**Oliva, Steven (1-2)**	McKay, Gus (2-5)	None	ESPN+	387	32–15	21–8
May 4	at Incarnate Word		Sullivan Field • San Antonio, TX	16–5^{8}	**Limas, Jacob (2-2)**	Elizondo, Jackson (4-5)	None	ESPN+	312	33–15	22–8
May 6	at Baylor*		Baylor Ballpark • Waco, TX	7–10	Stasio, Cole (3-1)	**Bonilla, Robert (1-3)**	Craig, Gabe (9)	ESPN+	1,871	33–16	
May 13	Texas State*		UTRGV Baseball Stadium • Edinburg, TX	11-9	**Anthony Tejada (3-1)**	Chase Mora (0-1)	None	ESPN+	6,189	34–16	

Postseason (2–2)

Southland Tournament (Edinburg Bracket) (2–2)
Date	Opponent	(Seed)/Rank	Site/stadium	Score	Win	Loss	Save	TV	Attendance	Overall record	Tournament record
May 15	(7) Texas A&M–Corpus Christi	(2)	UTRGV Baseball Stadium • Edinburg, TX	11–8	**Oliva, Steven (2-2)**	Dean, D (2-5)	None	ESPN+	3,215	35–16	1–0
May 16	(6) Houston Christian	(2)	UTRGV Baseball Stadium • Edinburg, TX	6–9	Caravalho, Joshua (9-3)	**Limas, Jacob (2-3)**	Norton, Ben (8)	ESPN+	3,381	35–17	1–1
May 17	(7) Texas A&M–Corpus Christi	(2)	UTRGV Baseball Stadium • Edinburg, TX	10–4	**Oliva, Steven (3-2)**	Molina, M (0-2)	None	ESPN+		36–17	2–1
May 17	(6) Houston Christian	(2)	UTRGV Baseball Stadium • Edinburg, TX	2–4	Castano, Louis (6-1)	**Bonilla, Robert (1-4)**	None	ESPN+	2,497	36–18	2–2
Legend: = Win = Loss = Canceled Bold = UT Rio Grande Valley team member Rankings are based on the team's current ranking in the D1Baseball poll. Schedule Source:
