= 2025 McNeese Cowboys baseball team =

American college baseball season

2025 McNeese Cowboys baseball
- Conference: Southland Conference
- Record: 31–15 (19–11 Southland)
- Head coach: Justin Hill (12th season)
- Assistant coaches: Jim Ricklefsen; Miles Durham; Peyton McLemore
- Home stadium: Joe Miller Ballpark

2025 Southland Conference baseball standings
	Conf.				Overall
Team	W		L	PCT	W		L	PCT
Southeastern Louisiana ‍†‍‍	22	–	8	.733	38	–	16	.704
UT Rio Grande Valley ‍†‍‍	22	–	8	.733	36	–	18	.667
Lamar ‍‍‍	20	–	10	.667	40	–	17	.702
McNeese ‍‍‍	19	–	11	.633	31	–	17	.646
Northwestern State ‍‍‍	19	–	11	.633	35	–	21	.625
Houston Christian ‍‍‡‍^{y}	17	–	13	.567	32	–	25	.561
New Orleans ‍‍‍	12	–	18	.400	28	–	26	.519
Texas A&M–Corpus Christi ‍‍‍	12	–	18	.400	21	–	31	.404
Nicholls ‍‍‍	10	–	20	.333	17	–	32	.347
Stephen F. Austin ‍‍‍	9	–	21	.300	18	–	31	.367
Incarnate Word ‍‍‍	3	–	27	.100	17	–	33	.340
† – Conference champion ‡ – Tournament champion y – Invited to the NCAA Tournament; As of May 31, 2025; Rankings from D1Baseball

The 2025 McNeese Cowboys baseball team represents McNeese State University during the 2025 NCAA Division I baseball season. The Cowboys play their home games at Joe Miller Ballpark and are led by twelfth–year head coach Justin Hill. They are members of the Southland Conference.

== Preseason ==
=== Southland Conference Coaches Poll ===
The Southland Conference Coaches Poll was released on February 6, 2025. McNeese was picked to finish third in the Southland Conference with 145 overall votes.

Coaches poll
Predicted finish	Team	Votes (1st place)
1	Lamar	197 (18)
2	Southeastern Louisiana	146 (4)
3	McNeese	145
4	UT Rio Grande Valley	144
5	Nicholls	129
6	New Orleans	128
7	Incarnate Word	95
8	Northwestern State	89
9	Texas A&M–Corpus Christi	73
10	Houston Christian	37
11	Stephen F. Austin	27

=== Preseason All-Southland team ===
Conner Westenburg was named to the conference preseason first team. Simon Larranaga was named to the conference preseason second team.

==== First Team ====
- Zak Skinner* (LU, JR, Catcher)
- Brayden Evans* (LU, JR, 1st Base)
- Isaac Webb* (TAMU, SR, 2nd Base)
- TJ Salvaggio (SELU, SR, Shortstop)
- Rocco Gump (NWST, SR, 3rd Base)
- Reese Lipoma* (NWST, RSR, Outfielder)
- Connor Westenburg (MCN, SR, Outfielder)
- Cole Stromboe+ (SELU, RSR, Outfielder)
- Tristian Moore+ (UNO, RSR, Outfielder)
- Bryce Calloway* (UNO, SR, Utility)
- Rey Mendoza (UIW, GR, Designated Hitter)
- Brennan Stuprich* (SELU, RSR, Starting Pitcher)
- Josh Salinas (UIW, GR, Starting Pitcher)
- Zach Garcia (TAMU, SR, Starting Pitcher)
- Kyle Moseley (LU, SR, Relief Pitcher)

*-2024 Southland All-Conference Selection
+-Tie for final spot

==== Second Team ====
- Steven Lancia (UTRGV, SR, Catcher)
- Martin Vazquez (UTRGV, SR, 1st Base)
- Diego Villsecas* (UNO, SR, 2nd Base)
- Isaac Lopez (UTRGV, GR, Shortstop)
- Easton Moomau+ (UTRGV, SO, 3rd Base)
- Matt Ryan+ (LU, SR, 3rd Base)
- Balin Valentine (NWST, SR, Outfielder)
- Parker Coley (SELU, SR, Outfielder)
- Jude Hall (SELU, SR, Outfielder)
- Simon Larranaga (MCN, SR, Utility)
- Armani Raygoza (UTRGV, RSO, Designated Hitter)
- Parker Edwards (HCU, SR, Starting Pitcher)
- Angelo Cabral (UTRGV, GR, Starting Pitcher)
- Tyler Bryan (NWST, JR, Starting Pitcher)
- Larson Fabre (SELU, JR, Relief Pitcher)

*-2024 Southland All-Conference Selection
+-Tie for final spot

== Schedule and results ==
Legend
	McNeese State win
	McNeese State loss
	Postponement/Cancelation/Suspensions
**Bold**	McNeese State team member
*	Non-Conference game
†	Make-Up Game

2025 McNeese Cowboys baseball game log (31–15)
Regular season (31–15)

February (7–1)
Date	Opponent	Rank	Site/stadium	Score	Win	Loss	Save	TV	Attendance	Overall record	SLC Record
Feb. 14	Wichita State*		Joe Miller Ballpark • Lake Charles, LA	7–1	**Lopez, Sergio (1-0)**	Hamilton, Brady (0-1)	None	ESPN+	1,010	1–0	
Feb. 15	Wichita State*		Joe Miller Ballpark • Lake Charles, LA	11–6	**Strmiska, Caleb (1-0)**	Anderson, Caleb (0-1)	None	ESPN+	999	2–0	
Feb. 16	Wichita State*		Joe Miller Ballpark • Lake Charles, LA	2–6	Miner, Jace (1-0)	**Blackwell, Jake (0-1)**	Potter, Nick (1)	ESPN+	1.011	2–1	
Feb. 18	at Texas A&M*		Olsen Field at Blue Bell Park • College Station, TX			**Cancelled**		TAMU Sports Network			
Feb. 21	Oakland*		Joe Miller Ballpark • Lake Charles, LA	1–0	**Gravel, Alexis (1-0)**	Hunter Pidek (0-2)	Lopez, Sergio (1)	ESPN+	867	3–1	
Feb. 22	Oakland*		Joe Miller Ballpark • Lake Charles, LA	5–4	**Lopez, Sergio (2-0)**	Gage Smith (0-1)	None	ESPN+	901	4–1	
Feb. 23	Oakland*		Joe Miller Ballpark • Lake Charles, LA	4–3	**Cunningham, Braedyn (1-0)**	Ryan Uhlenhake (0-1)	None	ESPN+	878	5–1	
Feb. 25	Louisiana*		Joe Miller Ballpark • Lake Charles, LA	3–0	**Mott, Marcus (1-0)**	JR Tollett (1-1)	**Lopez, Sergio (1)**	ESPN+	1,383	6–1	
Feb. 28	Nicholls		Joe Miller Ballpark • Lake Charles, LA	5–1	**Gravel, Alexis (2-0)**	Lindsey, Michael (0-1)	**Blackwell, Jake (1)**	ESPN+	937	7–1	1–0

March (11–4)
Date	Opponent	Rank	Site/stadium	Score	Win	Loss	Save	TV	Attendance	Overall record	SLC Record
Mar 1	Nicholls		Joe Miller Ballpark • Lake Charles, LA	2–1	**Fritcher, Blayne (1-0)**	Sparks, Alec (2-1)	**Lopez, Sergio (1)**	ESPN+	1,014	8–1	2–0
Mar 2	Nicholls		Joe Miller Ballpark • Lake Charles, LA	14–3^{7}	**Strmiska, Caleb (2-0)**	Hill, Dalton (1-2)	None	ESPN+	988	9–1	3–0
Mar 4	Dillard*		Joe Miller Ballpark • Lake Charles, LA	19–6^{7}	**Nachtsheim, Eric (1-0)**	Burnett, Kejuan (0-1)	None	ESPN+	856	10–1	
Mar 7	Houston Christian		Husky Field • Houston, TX	2–6	Castano, Louis (2-0)	**Gravel, Alexis (2-1)**	None	ESPN+	317	10–2	3–1
Mar 8	at Houston Christian		Husky Field • Houston, TX	8–15	Caravalho, Joshua (4-0)	**Cooper Golden (0-1)**	Norton, Ben (2)		297	10–3	3–2
Mar 9	at Houston Christian		Husky Field • Houston, TX	6–4	**Lopez, Sergio (3-0)**	Smith, Ben (1-1)	None	ESPN+	212	11–3	4–2
Mar 12	at Louisiana*		M. L. Tigue Moore Field at Russo Park • Lafayette, LA	4–2	**Golden, Cooper (1-1)**	Blake McGehee (1-3)	Corcoran, Brady (1)	ESPN+	3,011	12–3	
Battle of the Border (Rivalry)
Mar 14	Lamar		Joe Miller Ballpark • Lake Charles, LA	7–8^{10}	Neal, Austin (1-0)	Sergio Lopez (3-1)	None	ESPN+	727	12–4	4–3
Mar 15	Lamar		Joe Miller Ballpark • Lake Charles, LA	9–8^{10}	**Brady Corcoran(1-0)**	Moseley, Kyle(0-3)	None	ESPN+	1,111	13–4	5–3
Mar 16	Lamar		Joe Miller Ballpark • Lake Charles, LA	9–4	**Paul Coppinger (1-0)**	Olivier, Chris (2-1)	None	ESPN+	1,032	14–4	6–3
Mar 18	Mississippi Valley State*		Joe Miller Ballpark • Lake Charles, LA				**Cancelled**				
Mar 19	Mississippi Valley State*		Joe Miller Ballpark • Lake Charles, LA				**Cancelled**				
Exhibition
Mar 19	John Melvin University*		Joe Miller Ballpark • Lake Charles, LA	10–1	**Strmiska, Caleb (3-0)**	Gavin LeBlanc (4-2)	None		917		
Mar 21	at Southeastern Louisiana		Pat Kenelly Diamond at Alumni Field • Hammond, LA	0–6	Stuprich, Brennan (6-0)	**Cooper Golden (1-2)**	St. Pierre, Brady (4)	ESPN+	1,181	14–5	6–3
Mar 22	at Southeastern Louisiana		Pat Kenelly Diamond at Alumni Field • Hammond, LA	10–9	**Sergio Lopez (4-1)**	Vosburg, Aiden (1-1)	**Paul Coppinger (1)**	ESPN+	2,117	15–5	7–4
Mar 23	at Southeastern Louisiana		Pat Kenelly Diamond at Alumni Field • Hammond, LA	7–1	**Parker Morgan (1-0)**	Lobell, Blake (2-1)	**Diego Corrales (1)**	ESPN+	1,036	16–5	8–4
Mar 25	Southern*		Joe Miller Ballpark • Lake Charles, LA	15–5^{7}	**Fritcher, Blayne (2-0))**	Stephen Tolbert (0-1)	None	ESPN+	925	17–5	
Mar 26	Dillard*		Joe Miller Ballpark • Lake Charles, LA	14–0^{7}	**Gravel, Alexis (3-1)**	Reed, Danik (1-1))	None	ESPN+	894	18–5	

April (11–6)
Date	Opponent	Rank	Site/stadium	Score	Win	Loss	Save	TV	Attendance	Overall record	SLC Record
Apr 1	Alcorn State*		Joe Miller Ballpark • Lake Charles, LA	21–3^{7}	**Primeaux, Parker (1-0)**	Dews,Myles (1-3)	None	ESPN+	857	19–5	
Apr 4	New Orleans		Joe Miller Ballpark • Lake Charles, LA	8–5	**Blackwell, Jake (1-1)**	Austin, Ira (1-1)	**Corcoran, Brady (2)**	ESPN+	990	20–5	9–4
Apr 5	New Orleans		Joe Miller Ballpark • Lake Charles, LA	10–8	**Primeaux, Parker (2-0)**	Kimball, Carson (1-1)	**Blackwell, Jake (2)**	ESPN+	990	21–5	10–4
Apr 6	New Orleans		Joe Miller Ballpark • Lake Charles, LA	3–2	**Blackwell, Jake (2-1)**	Calloway, Bryce (0-1)	None	ESPN+	954	22–5	11–4
Apr 9	Houston*		Schroeder Park • Houston, TX	4–3^{10}	**Blackwell, Jake (3-1)**	Jean, Antoine (3-1)	**Nachtsheim, Eric (1)**	ESPN+	807	23–5	
Apr 11	at Incarnate Word		Sullivan Field • San Antonio, TX	11–6	**Golden, Cooper (2-2)**	McKay, Gus (2-4)	None	ESPN+	144	24–5	12–4
Apr 12	at Incarnate Word		Sullivan Field • San Antonio, TX	8–1	**Gravel, Alexis (4-1)**	Salinas, Josh (2-5)	None	ESPN+	263	25–5	13–4
Apr 13	at Incarnate Word		Sullivan Field • San Antonio, TX	14–7	**Coppinger, Paul (2-0)**	Posey, Jonah (1-1)	None	ESPN+	188	26–5	14–4
Apr 15	at No. 9 LSU*		Alex Box Stadium, Skip Bertman Field • Baton Rouge, LA	3–10	Schmidt, William (6-0)	**Morgan, Parker (1-1)**	None	SECN+	10,756	26–6	
Apr 17	Texas A&M–Corpus Christi		Joe Miller Ballpark • Lake Charles, LA	8–5	**Golden, Cooper (3-2)**	Burdick, Gage (2-3)	None	ESPN+	1,075	27–6	15–4
Apr 18	Texas A&M–Corpus Christi		Joe Miller Ballpark • Lake Charles, LA	5–13	Garcia, Zach (4-4)	**Gravel, Alexis (4-2)**	None	ESPN+	999	27–7	15–5
Apr 19	Texas A&M–Corpus Christi		Joe Miller Ballpark • Lake Charles, LA	3–1	**Lopez, Sergio (5-1)**	Dean, David (1-4)	**Blackwell, Jake (3)**	ESPN+	1,233	28–7	16–5
Apr 22	Louisiana Christian*		Joe Miller Ballpark • Lake Charles, LA	3–4	Flotte, Trip (2-3)	**Corrales, Diego (0-1)**	Alfonso, Cowan (6)	ESPN+	1,102	28–8	
Apr 25	at UT Rio Grande Valley		UTRGV Baseball Stadium • Edinburg, TX	9–6	**Lopez, Sergio (6-1)**	Tejada, Anthony (2-1)	None	ESPN+	4,025	29–8	17–5
Apr 26	at UT Rio Grande Valley		UTRGV Baseball Stadium • Edinburg, TX	5–9	Nolan, Nick (1-1)	**Primeaux, Parker (2-1)**	None	ESPN+	4,589	29–9	17–6
Apr 27	at UT Rio Grande Valley		UTRGV Baseball Stadium • Edinburg, TX	3–5	Thayer, Harrison (3-2)	**Blackwell, Jake (3-2)**	None	ESPN+	1,134	29–10	17–7
Apr 29	Houston*		Joe Miller Ballpark • Lake Charles, LA	3–4	Luzardo, Diego (2-1)	**Corrales, Diego (0-2)**	Roman, Richie (7)	ESPN+	947	29–11	

May (2–4)
Date	Opponent	Rank	Site/stadium	Score	Win	Loss	Save	TV	Attendance	Overall record	SLC Record
May 3	Stephen F. Austin		Joe Miller Ballpark • Lake Charles, LA	4–5	Templeton, Cody (5-4)	**Corcoran, Brady (1-1)**	Boyett, Reid (2)	ESPN+	887	29–12	17–8
May 3	Stephen F. Austin		Joe Miller Ballpark • Lake Charles, LA	12–2^{8}	**Lopez, Sergio (7-1)**	Mulcahy, Dylan (1-4)	None	ESPN+	984	30–12	18–8
May 4	Stephen F. Austin		Joe Miller Ballpark • Lake Charles, LA	3–10	Balmaceda, Elian (1-5)	**Morgan, Parker (1-2)**	James, Jack (1)	ESPN+	1,037	30–13	18–9
May 6	at Southern*		Lee–Hines Field • Baton Rouge, LA	Game canceled							
May 8	at Northwestern State		H. Alvin Brown–C. C. Stroud Field • Natchitoches, LA	2–5	White, Carter (4-1)	**Golden, Cooper (3-3)**	Marionneaux, Dylan (1)	ESPN+	751	30–14	18–10
May 9	at Northwestern State		H. Alvin Brown–C. C. Stroud Field • Natchitoches, LA	7–6	**Nachtsheim, Eric (2-0)**	Fiveash, Caden (1-1)	None	ESPN+	864	31–14	19–10
May 10	at Northwestern State		H. Alvin Brown–C. C. Stroud Field • Natchitoches, LA	6–7	**Corrales, Diego (0-3)**	Anderson, Austin (2)		ESPN+	987	31–15	19–11

Postseason (0–0)

Southland Tournament (Hammond Bracket) (0–0)
Date	Opponent	(Seed)/Rank	Site/stadium	Score	Win	Loss	Save	TV	Attendance	Overall record	Tournament record
May 15	vs. (4) Northwestern State	(5)	Pat Kenelly Diamond at Alumni Field • Hammond, LA	–	(-)	(-)		ESPN+		–	–
Legend: = Win = Loss = Canceled Bold = McNeese team member Rankings are based on the team's current ranking in the D1Baseball poll. Schedule source:
