= 2025 Stephen F. Austin Lumberjacks baseball team =

American college baseball season

2025 Stephen F. Austin Lumberjacks baseball
- Conference: Southland Conference
- Record: 18–31 (9–21 Southland)
- Head coach: Mark Vanderberg (1st season)
- Assistant coaches: Phillip Middleton; Caleb Clowers; Rusty Pendergrass
- Home stadium: Jaycees Field

2025 Southland Conference baseball standings
	Conf.				Overall
Team	W		L	PCT	W		L	PCT
Southeastern Louisiana ‍†‍‍	22	–	8	.733	38	–	16	.704
UT Rio Grande Valley ‍†‍‍	22	–	8	.733	36	–	18	.667
Lamar ‍‍‍	20	–	10	.667	40	–	17	.702
McNeese ‍‍‍	19	–	11	.633	31	–	17	.646
Northwestern State ‍‍‍	19	–	11	.633	35	–	21	.625
Houston Christian ‍‍‡‍^{y}	17	–	13	.567	32	–	25	.561
New Orleans ‍‍‍	12	–	18	.400	28	–	26	.519
Texas A&M–Corpus Christi ‍‍‍	12	–	18	.400	21	–	31	.404
Nicholls ‍‍‍	10	–	20	.333	17	–	32	.347
Stephen F. Austin ‍‍‍	9	–	21	.300	18	–	31	.367
Incarnate Word ‍‍‍	3	–	27	.100	17	–	33	.340
† – Conference champion ‡ – Tournament champion y – Invited to the NCAA Tournament; As of May 31, 2025; Rankings from D1Baseball

The 2025 Stephen F. Austin Lumberjacks baseball team represented Stephen F. Austin State University during the 2025 NCAA Division I baseball season. The Lumberjacks played their home games at Jaycees Field and were led by first–year head coach Mark Vanderberg. They are members of the Southland Conference. The 2025 season marked the Lumberjacks return to the Southland Conference returning from the Western Athletic Conference. The Lumberjacks compiled a 18–31 overall record and a 9–21 record in conference play for a tenth-place finish. They failed to qualify for the SLC conference tournament.

== Preseason ==
=== Southland Conference Coaches Poll ===
The Southland Conference Coaches Poll was released on February 6, 2025. Stephen F. Austin was picked to finish eleventh in the Southland Conference with 27 overall votes.

Coaches poll
Predicted finish	Team	Votes (1st place)
1	Lamar	197 (18)
2	Southeastern Louisiana	146 (4)
3	McNeese	145
4	UT Rio Grande Valley	144
5	Nicholls	129
6	New Orleans	128
7	Incarnate Word	95
8	Northwestern State	89
9	Texas A&M–Corpus Christi	73
10	Houston Christian	37
11	Stephen F. Austin	27

=== Preseason All-Southland team ===
No Lumberjacks were selected to either preseason all conference team.

==== First Team ====
- Zak Skinner* (LU, JR, Catcher)
- Brayden Evans* (LU, JR, 1st Base)
- Isaac Webb* (TAMU, SR, 2nd Base)
- TJ Salvaggio (SELU, SR, Shortstop)
- Rocco Gump (NWST, SR, 3rd Base)
- Reese Lipoma* (NWST, RSR, Outfielder)
- Connor Westenburg (McN, SR, Outfielder)
- Cole Stromboe+ (SELU, RSR, Outfielder)
- Tristian Moore+ (UNO, RSR, Outfielder)
- Bryce Calloway* (UNO, SR, Utility)
- Rey Mendoza (UIW, GR, Designated Hitter)
- Brennan Stuprich* (SELU, RSR, Starting Pitcher)
- Josh Salinas (UIW, GR, Starting Pitcher)
- Zach Garcia (TAMU, SR, Starting Pitcher)
- Kyle Moseley (LU, SR, Relief Pitcher)

*-2024 Southland All-Conference Selection
+-Tie for final spot

==== Second Team ====
- Steven Lancia (UTRGV, SR, Catcher)
- Martin Vazquez (UTRGV, SR, 1st Base)
- Diego Villsecas* (UNO, SR, 2nd Base)
- Isaac Lopez (UTRGV, GR, Shortstop)
- Easton Moomau+ (UTRGV, SO, 3rd Base)
- Matt Ryan+ (LU, SR, 3rd Base)
- Balin Valentine (NWST, SR, Outfielder)
- Parker Coley (SELU, SR, Outfielder)
- Jude Hall (SELU, SR, Outfielder)
- Simon Larranaga (MCN, SR, Utility)
- Armani Raygoza (UTRGV, RSO, Designated Hitter)
- Parker Edwards (HCU, SR, Starting Pitcher)
- Angelo Cabral (UTRGV, GR, Starting Pitcher)
- Tyler Bryan (NWST, JR, Starting Pitcher)
- Larson Fabre (SELU, JR, Relief Pitcher)

*-2024 Southland All-Conference Selection
+-Tie for final spot

== Schedule and results ==
Legend
	Stephen F. Austin win
	Stephen F. Austin loss
	Postponement/Cancelation/Suspensions
**Bold**	Stephen F. Austin team member

2025 Stephen F. Austin Lumberjacks baseball game log (18–31)
Regular season (18–31)

February (4–6)
Date	Opponent	Rank	Site/stadium	Score	Win	Loss	Save	TV	Attendance	Overall record	SLC Record
Feb. 14	vs. Purdue*		Constellation Field • Sugar Land, TX	1–4	Vallone, Michael (1-0)	**Tronson, Hayden (0-1)**	Cook, Avery (1)			0–1	
Feb. 14	vs. Purdue*		Constellation Field • Sugar Land, TX	2–4	Guiliano, Justin (1-0)	**Zeplin, Blaine (0-1)**	Cook, Avery (2)		331	0–2	
Feb. 15	vs. Purdue*		Constellation Field • Sugar Land, TX	2–14	Storey, Easton (1-0)	**Nickerson, Trent (0-1)**	None		288	0–3	
Feb. 16	vs. Purdue*		Constellation Field • Sugar Land, TX	12–16	Olson, Brayden (1-0)	**Balmaceda, Elian (0-1)**	None		442	0–4	
Feb. 21	Arkansas–Pine Bluff*		Jaycees Field • Nacogdoches, TX	13–3^{8}	**Templeton, Cody (1-0)**	K. Fabian (0-2)	None	ESPN+	100	1–4	
Feb. 22	Arkansas–Pine Bluff*		Jaycees Field • Nacogdoches, TX	7–6	**Valdez, Jonathan (1-0)**	C. Kenyon (0-1)	None		155	2–4	
Feb. 22	Arkansas–Pine Bluff*		Jaycees Field • Nacogdoches, TX				**Postponed to Feb 23 due to weather**				
Feb. 23	Arkansas–Pine Bluff*		Jaycees Field • Nacogdoches, TX	13–6	**Bowyer, Reid (1-0)**	N. Monceaux (0-2)	None		155	3–4	
Feb. 23	Arkansas–Pine Bluff*		Jaycees Field • Nacogdoches, TX	6–5	**Zeplin, Blaine (1-1)**	L. Bailey (0-1)	None	ESPN+	100	4–4	
Feb. 25	at Baylor*		Baylor Ballpark • Waco, TX	4–9	Murry, Grayson (1-0)	**Tronson, Hayden (0-2)**	None		1,837	4–5	
Feb. 28	New Orleans		Jaycees Field • Nacogdoches, TX	2–3	I. Austin (1-0)	**Zeplin, Blane (1-2)**	B. Calloway (1)	ESPN+	148	4–6	0–1

March (5–13)
Date	Opponent	Rank	Site/stadium	Score	Win	Loss	Save	TV	Attendance	Overall record	SLC Record
Mar 1	New Orleans		Jaycees Field • Nacogdoches, TX	14–4^{7}	**Mulcahy, Dylan (1-0)**	Z. Longshore (0-2)	None		134	5–6	1–1
Mar 2	New Orleans		Jaycees Field • Nacogdoches, TX	2–3	S. Jones (2-0)	**Balmaceda, Elian (0-2)**	B. Calloway (1)	ESPN+	162	5–7	1–2
Mar 5	Huston–Tillotson*		Jaycees Field • Nacogdoches, TX	10–3	**Bowyer, Reid (2-0)**	D. Delvalle (0-1)	None		121	6–7	
Mar 7	at Lamar		Vincent–Beck Stadium • Beaumont, TX	2–0	**Templeton, Cody (2-0)**	Hunsaker, Riely (1-2)	None		1,338	7–7	2–2
Mar 8	at Lamar		Vincent–Beck Stadium • Beaumont, TX	3–9	Havard, Peyton (2-1)	**Dylan Mulcahy (1-1)**	None	ESPN+	1,187	7–8	2–3
Mar 9	at Lamar		Vincent–Beck Stadium • Beaumont, TX	2–3	Olivier, Chris (2-0)	**Hayden Tronson (0-3)**	Neal, Austin (1)	ESPN+	773	7–9	2–4
Mar 12	at Abilene Christian*		Jaycees Field • Nacogdoches, TX	2–11	I. Campa (1-1)	**Landry, Garrett (0-1)**	None	ESPN+	134	7–10	
Mar 14	Southeastern Louisiana		Jaycees Field • Nacogdoches, TX	3–4	Stuprich, Brennan (5-0)	**C. Templeton (2-1)**	St. Pierre, Brady (3)	ESPN+		7–11	2–5
Mar 15	Southeastern Louisiana		Jaycees Field • Nacogdoches, TX	3–16	Polk, Lakin (3-0)	**E. Balmaceda (0-3)**	None	ESPN+	160	7–12	2–6
Mar 16	Southeastern Louisiana		Jaycees Field • Nacogdoches, TX	0–10^{8}	Lobell, Blake (2-0)	**H. Tronson (0-4)**	None	ESPN+	160	7–13	2–7
Mar 19	at Abilene Christian*		Crutcher Scott Field • Abilene, TX	15–13	**James, Jack (1-0)**	Iain Campa (1-2)	**Balmaceda, Elian (1)**		188	8–13	
Mar 21	at Tarleton State*		Cecil Ballow Baseball Complex • Stephenville, TX	5–2	**Templeton, Cody (3-1)**	Burcham, Jake (1-3)	Balmaceda, Elian (1)		522	9–13	
Mar 22	at Tarleton State*		Cecil Ballow Baseball Complex • Stephenville, TX	8–14	Beaird, Ryan (1-3)	**Munson, Kadin (0-1)**	None		487	9–14	
Mar 23	at Tarleton State*		Cecil Ballow Baseball Complex • Stephenville, TX	3–8	Olson, Tyler (2-1)	**Jonathan Valdez (1-1)**	None		429	9–15	
Mar 25	at Houston*		Schroeder Park • Houston, TX	2–9	Solis, Alex (1-0)	**Zeplin, Blane (1-3)**	None	ESPN+	906	9–16	
Mar 28	at Houston Christian		Husky Field • Houston, TX	4–6	Castano, Louis (3-0)	Jack James (1-1)	None	ESPN+	213	9–17	2–8
Mar 29	at Houston Christian		Husky Field • Houston, TX	8–12	Ferazzi, Nick (1-0)	**Elian Balmaceda (0-4)**	None	ESPN+	244	9–18	2–9
Mar 30	at Houston Christian		Husky Field • Houston, TX	4–6	Cyr, Jacob (1-0)	**Jonathan Valdez (1-2)**	Norton, Ben (4)		204	9–19	2–10

April (4–11)
Date	Opponent	Rank	Site/stadium	Score	Win	Loss	Save	TV	Attendance	Overall record	SLC Record
Apr 1	at Louisiana–Monroe*		Lou St. Amant Field • Monroe, LA	4–8	Eager, Brennan (4-2)	**Tronson, Hayden (0-5)**	None	ESPN+	997	9–20	
Apr 4	Texas A&M–Corpus Christi		Jaycees Field • Nacogdoches, TX	7–14	Garcia, Zach (3-3)	**Templeton, Cody (3-2)**	None	ESPN+	102	9–21	2–11
Apr 6	Texas A&M–Corpus Christi		Jaycees Field • Nacogdoches, TX	5–8^{16}	Soliz, Cam (1-3)	**Bowyer, Reid (2-1)**	None	ESPN+	133	9–22	2–12
Apr 7	Texas A&M–Corpus Christi		Jaycees Field • Nacogdoches, TX	4–6	Crane, Tristan (1-0)	**Munson, Kadin (0-2)**	Molina, Matthew (1)	ESPN+		9–23	2–13
Apr 8	LSU–Shreveport*		Jaycees Field • Nacogdoches, TX				**Canceled**				
Apr 11	at UT Rio Grande Valley		UTRGV Baseball Stadium • Edinburg, TX	2–7	Cabral, Angelo (4-4)	**Templeton, Cody (3-3)**	Lopez, Jack (1)	ESPN+	2,057	9–24	2–14
Apr 12	at UT Rio Grande Valley		UTRGV Baseball Stadium • Edinburg, TX	7–9	Thayer, Harrison (2-1)	**Mulcahy, Dylan (1-2)**	Oliva, Steven (5)	ESPN+	6,537	9–25	2–15
Apr 13	at UT Rio Grande Valley		UTRGV Baseball Stadium • Edinburg, TX	2–12^{7}	Loa, Víctor (5-1)	**Landry, Garrett (0-2)**	None	ESPN+	1,243	9–26	2–16
Apr 15	Prairie View A&M*		Jaycees Field • Nacogdoches, TX	9–6	**Tronson, Hayden (1-5)**	Bravo, Leonardo (2-2)	**Boyett, Reid (1)**	ESPN+	80	10–26	
Apr 17	at Nicholls		Ben Meyer Diamond at Ray E. Didier Field • Thibodaux, LA	3–5	Parache, Nuno (3-1)	**Templeton, Cody (3-4)**	Jordan, Harper (2)		445	10–27	2–17
Apr 18	at Nicholls		Ben Meyer Diamond at Ray E. Didier Field • Thibodaux, LA	7–5	**Boyett, Reid (1-0)**	Sparks, Alec (4-3)	**Balmaceda, Elian (3)**		1,010	11–27	3–17
Apr 19	at Nicholls		Ben Meyer Diamond at Ray E. Didier Field • Thibodaux, LA	6–7^{13}	Fields, Nick (2-1)	**Boyett, Reid (1-1)**	None		955	11–28	3–18
Apr 22	at Alcorn State*		Foster Baseball Field at McGowan Stadium • Lorman, MS				**Canceled**				
Apr 23	Texas A&M–Texarkana*		Jaycees Field • Nacogdoches, TX				**Canceled**				
Apr 25	Northwestern State		Jaycees Field • Nacogdoches, TX	2–12	White, Carter (3-1)	**Mulcahy, Dylan (1-3)**	None	ESPN+	144	11–29	3–19
Apr 26	Northwestern State		Jaycees Field • Nacogdoches, TX	8–1	**Templeton, Cody (4-4)**	Bryan, Tyler (1-6)	None	ESPN+	164	12–29	4–19
Apr 27	Northwestern State		Jaycees Field • Nacogdoches, TX	5–7	Anderson, Austin (3-0)	**Balmaceda, Elian (0-5)**	None	ESPN+	168	12–30	4–20
Apr 29	at Grambling*		Wilbert Ellis Field at Ralph Waldo Emerson Jones Park • Grambling, LA	20–8	**Tronson, Hayden (2-5)**	Dooley, Taylor (1-2)	None		75	13–30	

May (5–1)
Date	Opponent	Rank	Site/stadium	Score	Win	Loss	Save	TV	Attendance	Overall record	SLC Record
May 3	at McNeese		Joe Miller Ballpark • Lake Charles, LA	5–4	**Templeton, Cody (5-4)**	Corcoran, Brady (1-1)	**Boyett, Reid (2)**	ESPN+	887	14–30	5–20
May 3	at McNeese		Joe Miller Ballpark • Lake Charles, LA	2–12^{8}	Lopez, Sergio (7-1)	**Mulcahy, Dylan (1-4)**	None	ESPN+	984	14–31	5–21
May 4	at McNeese		Joe Miller Ballpark • Lake Charles, LA	10–3	**Balmaceda, Elian (1-5)**	Morgan, Parker (1-2)	**James, Jack (1)**	ESPN+	1,037	15–31	6–21
May 8	Incarnate Word		Jaycees Field • Nacogdoches, TX	14–12	**Bowyer, Reid (3-1)**	Robles, Bruno (1-1)	**Balmaceda, Elian (1)**	ESPN+	142	16–31	7–21
May 9	Incarnate Word		Jaycees Field • Nacogdoches, TX	6–2	**Templeton, Cody (6-4)**	Ejgarcia (5-6)	None	ESPN+	159	17–31	8–21
May 10	Incarnate Word		Jaycees Field • Nacogdoches, TX	13–12	**Bowyer, Reid (4-1)**	Byrd (0-2)	**Boyett, Reid (1)**	ESPN+	225	18–31	9–21

Legend: = Win = Loss = Canceled
Bold = Stephen F. Austin team member
Rankings are based on the team's current ranking in the D1Baseball poll.

|}

Schedule source:
