= Sullivan Field =

Sullivan Field may refer to:

- Sullivan Field (University of Incarnate Word), the baseball field of the Incarnate Word Cardinals
- Sullivan Field (Loyola Marymount), the soccer/futbol field of the Loyola Marymount Lions
