= 2025 Southland Conference baseball tournament =

- Teams: 8
- Format: Double-elimination
- Finals site: Husky Field; Houston, Texas
- Champions: Houston Christian (2nd title)
- Winning coach: Clay VanderLaan (1st title)
- MVP: Parker Edwards (Houston Christian)

2025 Southland Conference baseball standings
| | Conf. | | | | Overall |
| Team | W | | L | PCT | W | | L | PCT |
|---|---|---|---|---|---|---|---|---|
| Southeastern Louisiana ‍†‍‍ | 22 | – | 8 | .733 | 38 | – | 16 | .704 |
| UT Rio Grande Valley ‍†‍‍ | 22 | – | 8 | .733 | 36 | – | 18 | .667 |
| Lamar ‍‍‍ | 20 | – | 10 | .667 | 40 | – | 17 | .702 |
| McNeese ‍‍‍ | 19 | – | 11 | .633 | 31 | – | 17 | .646 |
| Northwestern State ‍‍‍ | 19 | – | 11 | .633 | 35 | – | 21 | .625 |
| Houston Christian ‍‍‡‍^{y} | 17 | – | 13 | .567 | 32 | – | 25 | .561 |
| New Orleans ‍‍‍ | 12 | – | 18 | .400 | 28 | – | 26 | .519 |
| Texas A&M–Corpus Christi ‍‍‍ | 12 | – | 18 | .400 | 21 | – | 31 | .404 |
| Nicholls ‍‍‍ | 10 | – | 20 | .333 | 17 | – | 32 | .347 |
| Stephen F. Austin ‍‍‍ | 9 | – | 21 | .300 | 18 | – | 31 | .367 |
| Incarnate Word ‍‍‍ | 3 | – | 27 | .100 | 17 | – | 33 | .340 |
† – Conference champion ‡ – Tournament champion y – Invited to the NCAA Tournament; As of May 31, 2025; Rankings from D1Baseball

The 2025 Southland Conference baseball tournament was held May 15–18 and May 22–23. The top eight regular season finishers of the league's eleven teams met in double-elimination tournaments held at the home fields of the #1 and #2 seeded teams, which were Southeastern Louisiana and UTRGV. The finals were held at the home field of the highest remaining seeded team, which was Husky Field (Houston Christian). Houston Christian won the championship round by sweeping New Orleans two games to none, and secured the Southland Conference's automatic bid to the 2025 NCAA baseball tournament.

== Seeding and format ==
The tournament format was the same as used in the conference 2022 baseball tournament. The top eight finishers from the regular season were seeded one through eight, and played a two bracket, double-elimination tournament. The bracket winners moved-on to the championship series held at the home field of the highest remaining seeded team. Teams were seeded by record within the conference with a tie–breaker system to seed teams with identical conference records. The top eight teams in the conference qualified for the tournament.

| Seed | School | Conference | Tie-breaker #1 | Tie-breaker #2 |
|---|---|---|---|---|
| 1 | Southeastern Louisiana | 22–8 | 2–1 vs UT Rio Grande Valley | Not needed |
| 2 | UT Rio Grande Valley | 22–8 | 1–2 vs Southeastern Louisiana | Not needed |
| 3 | Lamar | 20–10 | Not needed | Not needed |
| 4 | Northwestern State | 19–11 | 2–1 vs McNeese | Not needed |
| 5 | McNeese | 19–11 | 1–2 vs Northwestern State | Not needed |
| 6 | Houston Christian | 17–13 | Not needed | Not needed |
| 7 | Texas A&M–Corpus Christi | 12–18 | 3–0 vs New Orleans | Not needed |
| 8 | New Orleans | 12–18 | 0–3 vs Texas A&M–Corpus Christi | Not needed |

Note: Nicholls, Stephen F. Austin, and Incarnate Word failed to qualify. Texas A&M–Commerce does not sponsor a baseball team.

== Results ==
First round | Quarterfinals
4 | Northwestern State | 7
5 | McNeese | 6
4 | Northwestern State | 2
8 | New Orleans | 3
1 | Southeastern Louisiana | 6
8 | New Orleans | 10
Group 1
5 | McNeese | 4
1 | Southeastern Louisiana | 7
1 | Southeastern Louisiana | 8
4 | Northwestern State | 11
3 | Lamar | 3
6 | Houston Christian | 6
6 | Houston Christian | 9
2 | UTRGV | 6
2 | UT Rio Grande Valley | 11
7 | Texas A&M–Corpus Christi | 8
Group 2
3 | Lamar | 5
7 | Texas A&M–Corpus Christi | 12
7 | Texas A&M–Corpus Christi | 4
2 | UTRGV | 10

Semifinals
8 | New Orleans | 12 | –
4 | Northwestern State | 11 | –
6 | Houston Christian | 4 | –
2 | UTRGV | 2 | –

Finals
8 | New Orleans | 3 | 11
6 | Houston Christian | 8 | 16

== All–Tournament Team ==
| Player | Team |
|---|---|
| **Parker Edwards** | Houston Christian |
| Katcher Halligan | Houston Christian |
| Jeremy Rader | Houston Christian |
| Trevor Roper | Houston Christian |
| Rhett Hendricks | Houston Christian |
| Jack Walker | Houston Christian |
| Louis Castano | Houston Christian |
| Bryce Calloway | New Orleans |
| Tristan Moore | New Orleans |
| Matt Gonzalez | New Orleans |
| Steven Oliva | UTRGV |
| Samuel Stephenson | Northwestern State |

MVP in bold

== See also ==
- 2025 Southland Conference softball tournament
