= 2025 Nicholls Colonels baseball team =

American college baseball season

2025 Nicholls Colonels baseball
- Conference: Southland Conference
- Record: 17–32 (10–20 Southland)
- Head coach: Brent Haring (1st season)
- Assistant coaches: Gabe Woods; Drew Finley; Brandt Jones
- Home stadium: Ben Meyer Diamond at Ray E. Didier Field

2025 Southland Conference baseball standings
	Conf.				Overall
Team	W		L	PCT	W		L	PCT
Southeastern Louisiana ‍†‍‍	22	–	8	.733	38	–	16	.704
UT Rio Grande Valley ‍†‍‍	22	–	8	.733	36	–	18	.667
Lamar ‍‍‍	20	–	10	.667	40	–	17	.702
McNeese ‍‍‍	19	–	11	.633	31	–	17	.646
Northwestern State ‍‍‍	19	–	11	.633	35	–	21	.625
Houston Christian ‍‍‡‍^{y}	17	–	13	.567	32	–	25	.561
New Orleans ‍‍‍	12	–	18	.400	28	–	26	.519
Texas A&M–Corpus Christi ‍‍‍	12	–	18	.400	21	–	31	.404
Nicholls ‍‍‍	10	–	20	.333	17	–	32	.347
Stephen F. Austin ‍‍‍	9	–	21	.300	18	–	31	.367
Incarnate Word ‍‍‍	3	–	27	.100	17	–	33	.340
† – Conference champion ‡ – Tournament champion y – Invited to the NCAA Tournament; As of May 31, 2025; Rankings from D1Baseball

The 2025 Nicholls Colonels baseball team represented Nicholls State University during the 2025 NCAA Division I baseball season. The Colonels played their home games at Ben Meyer Diamond at Ray E. Didier Field and were led by first–year head coach Brent Haring. They were members of the Southland Conference. The Colonels compiled a 17–32 overall record and a 10–20 record in conference play for a ninth-place finish. They failed to qualify for the SLC conference tournament.

== Preseason ==
=== Southland Conference Coaches Poll ===
The Southland Conference Coaches Poll was released on February 6, 2025. Nicholls was picked to finish fifth in the Southland Conference with 129 overall votes.

Coaches poll
Predicted finish	Team	Votes (1st place)
1	Lamar	197 (18)
2	Southeastern Louisiana	146 (4)
3	McNeese	145
4	UT Rio Grande Valley	144
5	Nicholls	129
6	New Orleans	128
7	Incarnate Word	95
8	Northwestern State	89
9	Texas A&M–Corpus Christi	73
10	Houston Christian	37
11	Stephen F. Austin	27

=== Preseason All-Southland team ===
No Colonels were named to the conference preseason first team or second team.

==== First Team ====
- Zak Skinner* (LU, JR, Catcher)
- Brayden Evans* (LU, JR, 1st Base)
- Isaac Webb* (TAMU, SR, 2nd Base)
- TJ Salvaggio (SELU, SR, Shortstop)
- Rocco Gump (NWST, SR, 3rd Base)
- Reese Lipoma* (NWST, RSR, Outfielder)
- Connor Westenburg (McN, SR, Outfielder)
- Cole Stromboe+ (SELU, RSR, Outfielder)
- Tristian Moore+ (UNO, RSR, Outfielder)
- Bryce Calloway* (UNO, SR, Utility)
- Rey Mendoza (UIW, GR, Designated Hitter)
- Brennan Stuprich* (SELU, RSR, Starting Pitcher)
- Josh Salinas (UIW, GR, Starting Pitcher)
- Zach Garcia (TAMU, SR, Starting Pitcher)
- Kyle Moseley (LU, SR, Relief Pitcher)

*-2024 Southland All-Conference Selection
+-Tie for final spot

==== Second Team ====
- Steven Lancia (UTRGV, SR, Catcher)
- Martin Vazquez (UTRGV, SR, 1st Base)
- Diego Villsecas* (UNO, SR, 2nd Base)
- Isaac Lopez (UTRGV, GR, Shortstop)
- Easton Moomau+ (UTRGV, SO, 3rd Base)
- Matt Ryan+ (LU, SR, 3rd Base)
- Balin Valentine (NWST, SR, Outfielder)
- Parker Coley (SELU, SR, Outfielder)
- Jude Hall (SELU, SR, Outfielder)
- Simon Larranaga (MCN, SR, Utility)
- Armani Raygoza (UTRGV, RSO, Designated Hitter)
- Parker Edwards (HCU, SR, Starting Pitcher)
- Angelo Cabral (UTRGV, GR, Starting Pitcher)
- Tyler Bryan (NWST, JR, Starting Pitcher)
- Larson Fabre (SELU, JR, Relief Pitcher)

*-2024 Southland All-Conference Selection
+-Tie for final spot

== Schedule and results ==
Legend
	Nicholls win
	Nicholls loss
	Postponement/Cancelation/Suspensions
**Bold**	Nicholls team member
*	Non-Conference game
†	Make-Up Game

2025 Nicholls Colonels baseball game log (17–32)
Regular season (17–32)

February (5–5)
Date	Opponent	Rank	Site/stadium	Score	Win	Loss	Save	TV	Attendance	Overall record	SLC Record
Feb. 14	Northern Illinois*		Ben Meyer Diamond at Ray E. Didier Field • Thibodaux, LA	5–3	**Fields, Nick (1-0)**	Danny Cihocki (0-1)	**Jordan, Harper (1)**	ESPN+	522	1–0	
Feb. 15	Northern Illinois*		Ben Meyer Diamond at Ray E. Didier Field • Thibodaux, LA	10–2	**Sparks, Alec (1-0)**	Ty Brachbill (0-1)	None		572	2–0	
Feb. 16	Northern Illinois*		Ben Meyer Diamond at Ray E. Didier Field • Thibodaux, LA	2–21^{8}	Max Vaisvila (1-0)	**Hill, Dalton (0-1)**	None		534	2–1	
Feb. 18	Omaha*		Ben Meyer Diamond at Ray E. Didier Field • Thibodaux, LA	2–5	Carter Mick (1-0)	**van ‘T Klooster, Koen (0-1)**	Oliver Mabee (1)		402	2–2	
Feb. 19	LSU*		Ben Meyer Diamond at Ray E. Didier Field • Thibodaux, LA				**Postponed due to inclement weather.**				
Feb. 21	Little Rock*		Ben Meyer Diamond at Ray E. Didier Field • Thibodaux, LA	7–6	**Jordan, Harper (1-0)**	BEEZLEY, Josh (0-1)	**Simoneaux, Cole (1)**		360	3–2	
Feb. 22	Little Rock*		Ben Meyer Diamond at Ray E. Didier Field • Thibodaux, LA	4–1	**Sparks, Alec (2-0)**	BUNTING, Brody (1-1)	None		502	4–2	
Feb. 22	Little Rock*		Ben Meyer Diamond at Ray E. Didier Field • Thibodaux, LA	8–6	**Hill, Dalton (1-1)**	CLINE, Jack (1-1)	**Simoneaux, Cole (2)**		505	5–2	
Feb. 24	at No. 2 LSU*		Alex Box Stadium, Skip Bertman Field • Baton Rouge, LA	3–13^{7}	William Schmidt (1-0)	**Jordan, Harper (1-1)**	None	SECN+	10,030	5–3	
Feb. 25	Tulane*		Ben Meyer Diamond at Ray E. Didier Field • Thibodaux, LA	3–13	Blaise Wilcenski (3-0)	**van ‘T Klooster, Koen (0-2)**	None		611	5–4	
Feb. 28	at McNeese		Joe Miller Ballpark • Lake Charles, LA	1–5	Alexis Gravel (2-0)	**Lindsey, Michael (0-1)**	Jake Blackwell (1)	ESPN+	937	5–5	0–1

March (6–13)
Date	Opponent	Rank	Site/stadium	Score	Win	Loss	Save	TV	Attendance	Overall record	SLC Record
Mar 1	at McNeese		Joe Miller Ballpark • Lake Charles, LA	1–2	Blayne Fritcher (1-0)	**Sparks, Alec (2-1)**	Sergio Lopez (1)	ESPN+	1,014	5–6	0–2
Mar 2	at McNeese		Joe Miller Ballpark • Lake Charles, LA	3–14^{7}	Caleb Strmiska (2-0)	**Hill, Dalton (1-2)**	None	ESPN+	988	5–7	0–3
Mar 4	at Louisiana Tech*		J. C. Love Field at Pat Patterson Park • Ruston, LA	0–19^{7}	Parker,Kade (1-0)	**van ‘T Klooster, Koen (0-3)**	None	ESPN+	1,787	5–8	
Mar 5	at Louisiana Tech*		J. C. Love Field at Pat Patterson Park • Ruston, LA	0–10^{7}	Nichols, Luke (1-2)	**Hill, Dalton (1-3)**	None	ESPN+	1,771	5–9	
Mar 7	Texas A&M–Corpus Christi		Ben Meyer Diamond at Ray E. Didier Field • Thibodaux, LA	3–2	**Jordan, Harper (2-1)**	Garcia, Zach (2-1)	None		555	6–9	1–3
Mar 8	Texas A&M–Corpus Christi		Ben Meyer Diamond at Ray E. Didier Field • Thibodaux, LA	15–3^{7}	**Sparks, Alec (3-1)**	Singleton, Luke (1-3)	None		311	7–9	2–3
Mar 9	Texas A&M–Corpus Christi		Ben Meyer Diamond at Ray E. Didier Field • Thibodaux, LA	7–2	**Hill, Dalton (2-3)**	Shea, Bryson (1-1)	None		433	8–9	3–3
Mar 11	at Tulane*		Greer Field at Turchin Stadium • New Orleans, LA	5–9	Will Clements (1-0)	**van ‘T Klooster, Koen (0-4)**	None	ESPN+	1,438	8–10	
Mar 12	at #22 Mississippi State*		Dudy Noble Field, Polk–DeMent Stadium • Starkville, MS	1–2	Stevens, Nolan (1-0)	**Jordan, Harper (2-2)**	McPherson, Ryan (1)	SECN+	4,001	8–11	
Mar 14	at UT Rio Grande Valley		UTRGV Baseball Stadium • Edinburg, TX	2–13^{7}	Wiatrek, Wyatt (3-0)	Lindsey, Michael (0-2)	None	ESPN+	2,485	8–12	3–4
Mar 15	at UT Rio Grande Valley		UTRGV Baseball Stadium • Edinburg, TX	9–10^{13}	Bonilla, Robert (1-0)	**Simoneaux, Cole (0-1)**	None	ESPN+	4,352	8–13	3–5
Mar 16	at UT Rio Grande Valley		UTRGV Baseball Stadium • Edinburg, TX	5–14	Wanless, Caden (1-0)	**Fields, Nick (0-1)**	None	ESPN+	1,166	8–14	3–6
Mar 21	Incarnate Word		Ben Meyer Diamond at Ray E. Didier Field • Thibodaux, LA	7–1	**Parache, Nuno (1-0)**	Salinas, Josh (2-3)	None		504	9–14	4–6
Mar 22	Incarnate Word		Ben Meyer Diamond at Ray E. Didier Field • Thibodaux, LA	10–0^{7}	**Sparks, Alec (4-1)**	McKay, Gus (1-2)	None		613	10–14	5–6
Mar 23	Incarnate Word		Ben Meyer Diamond at Ray E. Didier Field • Thibodaux, LA	3–4	Elizondo, Jackson (3-3)	**McGibboney, Luke (0-1)**	Pillot, Braelin (3)		501	10–15	5–7
Mar 25	vs. No. 13 Southern Miss*		Keesler Federal Park • Biloxi, MS	8–5	**Harper, Jordan (3-2)**	Adams, Matthew (2-2)	**Poirrier, Cole (1)**		3,004	11–15	
Mar 28	at Northwestern State		H. Alvin Brown–C. C. Stroud Field • Natchitoches, LA	4–9	Marionneaux, Dylan (3-2)	**Parache, Nuno (1-1)**	White, Carter (1)	ESPN+		11–16	5–8
Mar 29	at Northwestern State		H. Alvin Brown–C. C. Stroud Field • Natchitoches, LA	5–9	Marien, Wesley (1-0)	**Jordan, Harper (3-3)**	Fiveash, Caden (1)	ESPN+	803	11–17	5–9
Mar 30	at Northwestern State		H. Alvin Brown–C. C. Stroud Field • Natchitoches, LA	2–6	Hillen, Trent (4-1)	**Lindsey, Michael (0-3)**	None	ESPN+	816	11–18	5–10

April (4–10)
Date	Opponent	Rank	Site/stadium	Score	Win	Loss	Save	TV	Attendance	Overall record	SLC Record
Apr 4	Houston Christian		Ben Meyer Diamond at Ray E. Didier Field • Thibodaux, LA	5–4	**Parache, Nuno (2-1)**	Edwards, Parker (1-2)	**Bordelon, Joseph (1)**		750	12–18	6–10
Apr 5	Houston Christian		Ben Meyer Diamond at Ray E. Didier Field • Thibodaux, LA	4–6	Caravalho, Joshua (6-1)	**Sparks, Alec (4-2)**	None		511	12–19	6–11
Apr 5	Houston Christian		Ben Meyer Diamond at Ray E. Didier Field • Thibodaux, LA	2–4	Smith, Ben (3-2)	**Lindsey, Michael (0-4)**	Castano, Louis (2)		511	12–20	6–12
Apr 8	No. 3 LSU*		Ben Meyer Diamond at Ray E. Didier Field • Thibodaux, LA	3–5	William Schmidt (5-0)	**Poirrier, Cole (0-1)**	None	ESPN+	1,550	12–21	
Apr 11	at Lamar		Vincent–Beck Stadium • Beaumont, TX	4–5^{10}	Havard, Peyton (5-1)	**Brennan, Woody (0-1)**	None	ESPN+	1,073	12–22	6–13
Apr 12	at Lamar		Vincent–Beck Stadium • Beaumont, TX	8–9	Stallings, Hayden (3-0)	**Poirrier, Cole (0-2)**	None	ESPN+	1,073	12–23	6–14
Apr 13	at Lamar		Vincent–Beck Stadium • Beaumont, TX	5–16^{7}	Sutton, Carter (5-0)	**Hill, Dalton (2-4)**	None	ESPN+	758	12–24	6–15
Apr 15	at Jackson State*		Braddy Field • Jackson, MS	14–6	**Woody, Brennan (1–1)**	Lourens, JeAndrick (0–3)	None		76	13–24	
Apr 17	Stephen F. Austin		Ben Meyer Diamond at Ray E. Didier Field • Thibodaux, LA	5–3	**Parache, Nuno (3-1)**	Templeton, Cody (3-4)	**Jordan, Harper (2)**		445	14–24	7–15
Apr 18	Stephen F. Austin		Ben Meyer Diamond at Ray E. Didier Field • Thibodaux, LA	5–7	Boyett, Reid (1-0)	**Sparks, Alec (4-3)**	Balmaceda, Elian (3)		1,010	14–25	7–16
Apr 19	Stephen F. Austin		Ben Meyer Diamond at Ray E. Didier Field • Thibodaux, LA	7–6^{13}	**Fields, Nick (2-1)**	Boyett, Reid (1-1)	None		955	15–25	8–16
Apr 22	at Southern*		Lee–Hines Field • Baton Rouge, LA				**Canceled due to inclement weather.**				
Apr 23	at Louisiana*		M. L. Tigue Moore Field at Russo Park • Lafayette, LA	2–6	Theut, Dylan (1-1)	**van 'T Klooster, Koen (0-5)**	None	ESPN+	2,814	15–26	
Apr 25	at Tulane*		Greer Field at Turchin Stadium • New Orleans, LA	4–9	Wilcenski, Blaise (4-3)	**Hill, Dalton (2-5)**	None	ESPN+	1,554	15–27	
Apr 30	at South Alabama*		Eddie Stanky Field • Mobile, AL	0–2	Brooks, Dalton (2-1)	**van 'T Klooster, Koen (0-6)**	Floyd, Andrew (4)	ESPN+	1,004	15–28	

May (2–4)
Date	Opponent	Rank	Site/stadium	Score	Win	Loss	Save	TV	Attendance	Overall record	SLC Record
May 2	at New Orleans		Maestri Field at Privateer Park • New Orleans, LA	7–2	**Jordan, Harper (4-3)**	Edwards, Grant (3-3)	**Simoneaux, Cole (3)**	ESPN+	603	16–28	9–16
May 3	at New Orleans		Maestri Field at Privateer Park • New Orleans, LA	2–3	Calloway, Bryce (2-1)	Bordelon, Joseph (0-1)	None	ESPN+	603	16–29	9–17
May 4	at New Orleans		Maestri Field at Privateer Park • New Orleans, LA	4–9	O'Dell, Hayden (2-0)	**Simoneaux, Cole (0-2)**	None	ESPN+	637	16–30	9–18
May 6	Jackson State*		Ben Meyer Diamond at Ray E. Didier Field • Thibodaux, LA				**Cancelled (weather)**				
May 8	Southeastern Louisiana		Ben Meyer Diamond at Ray E. Didier Field • Thibodaux, LA	13–0^{7}	**Parache, Nuno (4-1)**	Stuprich, Brennan (9-4)	None	ESPN+	911	17–30	10–18
May 9	Southeastern Louisiana		Ben Meyer Diamond at Ray E. Didier Field • Thibodaux, LA	4–5^{10}	Webb, Truitt (2-0)	**Bordelon, Joseph (0-2)**	None	ESPN+	899	17–31	10–19
May 10	Southeastern Louisiana		Ben Meyer Diamond at Ray E. Didier Field • Thibodaux, LA	4–19^{7}	Lobell, Blake (7-1)	**Simoneaux, Cole (0-3)**	None	ESPN+	711	17–32	10–20

|- ! colspan=9 | Legend: = Win = Loss = Canceled
Bold = Nicholls team member
Rankings are based on the team's current ranking in the D1Baseball poll. |}

Schedule source:
