= Jaycees Field =

Baseball venue in Nacogdoches, Texas, US

Pilgrim’s Park
- Interactive map of Pilgrim’s Park
- Location: 3715 Old Tyler Road, Nacogdoches, Texas, United States
- Coordinates: 31°38′04.6″N 94°40′54.6″W
- Capacity: 1,000
- Surface: Natural grass
- Scoreboard: Electronic
- Field size: Left Field 320 feet Center Field 390 feet Right Field 320 feet

Construction
- Renovated: 2009

Tenant
- Stephen F. Austin Lumberjacks baseball

Pilgrim’s Park is a baseball venue in Nacogdoches, Texas, United States. It is home to the Stephen F. Austin Lumberjacks baseball team of the NCAA Division I Southland Conference. The field has a capacity of 1,000 spectators.

== 2009 renovations ==
Prior to the 2009 season, the field underwent extensive renovations. Additions included 148 chairbacked seats, 740 bleacher seats, a new press box, and an awning over premium seating areas. The Lumberjacks opened the newly renovated facility on February 24, 2009, in a 7–5 loss to Houston.

== See also ==
- List of NCAA Division I baseball venues
