= Sullivan Field (University of Incarnate Word) =

Baseball field in San Antonio, Texas, US

- Interactive map of Sullivan Field
- Full name: Daniel J. Sullivan IV Baseball Field
- Location: San Antonio, Texas
- Coordinates: 29°28′08.4″N 98°28′14.8″W
- Owner: University of the Incarnate Word
- Operator: University of the Incarnate Word
- Capacity: 1,000
- Surface: AstroTurf RootZone Diamond OPS Series field turf
- Field size: 335 LF; 407 CF; 335 RF

Construction
- Opened: 1989

Tenant
- UIW Cardinals (1989–present )

Sullivan Field is a baseball park located in San Antonio, Texas, United States. It is the home of the University of the Incarnate Word Cardinals baseball team of the NCAA Division I Southland Conference. It opened on April 8, 1989, with a 5–2 win over their cross-town rival, the St. Mary's Rattlers. Lights were added before the 2004 season so that night baseball would be possible.

In 2018, Phase I of stadium improvements to both the baseball and softball fields was completed. Phase I included changing the field surface from Tiff 19 turf to AstroTurf RootZone Diamond OPS Series field turf, new backstops, netting and other improvements. The baseball field backstop wall and home plate were moved forward. Total cost of the first phase of improvements was $1.2 million.

== See also ==
- List of NCAA Division I baseball venues
