= 2025 LSU Tigers baseball team =

2025 season of Louisiana State University baseball team

2025 LSU Tigers baseball

Frisco College Baseball Classic champions Baton Rouge Regional champions Baton Rouge Super Regional champions

College World Series National champions
- Conference: Southeastern Conference

Ranking
- Coaches: No. 1
- D1Baseball.com: No. 1
- Record: 53–15 (19–11 SEC)
- Head coach: Jay Johnson (4th season)
- Assistant coaches: Josh Jordan (4th season); Josh Simpson (4th season)
- Hitting coach: Marc Wanaka (4th season)
- Pitching coach: Nate Yeskie (2nd season)
- Home stadium: Alex Box Stadium

2025 Southeastern Conference baseball standings
	Conf.				Overall
Team	W		L	PCT	W		L	PCT
No. 17 Texas ‍†‍‍^{y}	22	–	8	.733	44	–	14	.759
No. 3 Arkansas ‍‍‍^{y}	20	–	10	.667	50	–	15	.769
No. 1 LSU ‍‍‍^{y}	19	–	11	.633	53	–	15	.779
No. 18 Vanderbilt ‍‍‡‍^{y}	19	–	11	.633	43	–	18	.705
No. 19 Georgia ‍‍‍^{y}	18	–	12	.600	43	–	17	.717
No. 11 Auburn ‍‍‍^{y}	17	–	13	.567	41	–	20	.672
No. 21 Ole Miss ‍‍‍^{y}	16	–	14	.533	43	–	21	.672
No. 12 Tennessee ‍‍‍^{y}	16	–	14	.533	46	–	19	.708
Alabama ‍‍‍^{y}	16	–	14	.533	41	–	18	.695
Florida ‍‍‍^{y}	15	–	15	.500	39	–	22	.639
Mississippi State ‍‍‍^{y}	15	–	15	.500	36	–	23	.610
Oklahoma ‍‍‍^{y}	14	–	16	.467	38	–	22	.633
Kentucky ‍‍‍^{y}	13	–	17	.433	31	–	26	.544
Texas A&M ‍‍‍	11	–	19	.367	30	–	26	.536
South Carolina ‍‍‍	6	–	24	.200	28	–	29	.491
Missouri ‍‍‍	3	–	27	.100	16	–	39	.291
† – Conference champion ‡ – Tournament champion y – Invited to the NCAA Tournament; As of June 22, 2025; Rankings from D1Baseball

The 2025 LSU Tigers baseball team represented Louisiana State University during the 2025 NCAA Division I baseball season. The Tigers played their home games at Alex Box Stadium. The Tigers won their eighth overall national championship and their 2nd in 3 years.

== Preseason ==
=== Preseason SEC awards and honors ===
Preseason awards were announced in January or February 2025.

Preseason All-SEC Team
Player	No.	Position	Team	Class
Jared Jones	22	1B	First	Junior
Kade Anderson	32	SP	First	Sophomore
Gavin Guidry	8	RP	First	Junior
Daniel Dickinson	14	2B	Second	Junior

- SEC Preseason Freshman of the Year: Derek Curiel, UTL

=== SEC coaches poll ===
The SEC Coaches poll was released on February 2, 2025. LSU was predicted to finish fourth in the SEC.

SEC coaches poll
Predicted finish	Team	Votes (1st place)
1	Texas A&M	228 (10)
2	Tennessee	215 (1)
3	Arkansas	214 (3)
4	LSU	204 (1)
5	Florida	183 (1)
6	Georgia	165
7	Vanderbilt	156
8	Texas	146
9	Mississippi State	112
10	Kentucky	102
11	Oklahoma	101
12	Auburn	100
13	Alabama	98
14	South Carolina	61
15	Ole Miss	60
16	Missouri	31

== Personnel ==
=== Starters ===
Lineup
Pos.	No.	Player.	Year
C	23	Luis Hernandez	Senior
1B	22	Jared Jones	Junior
2B	14	Daniel Dickinson	Junior
3B	10	Michael Braswell III	Senior
SS	4	Steven Milam	Sophomore
LF	6	Derek Curiel	Freshman
CF	1	Chris Stanfield	Junior
RF	7	Jake Brown	Sophomore
DH	11	Josh Pearson	Senior

Weekend pitching rotation
Day	No.	Player.	Year
Friday	25	Kade Anderson	RS Junior
Saturday	24	Anthony Eyanson	Junior
Sunday	34	Chase Shores	RS Sophomore
Midweek	55	Conner Ware	Junior

=== Roster ===
2025 LSU Tigers baseball roster
Pitchers: 8 - Gavin Guidry - Junior; 9 - William Schmidt - Freshman; 24 - Anthony Eyanson - Junior; 25 - Kade Woods - (redshirt) Junior; 26 - Zac Cowan - Junior; 27 - Jaden Noot - (redshirt) Sophomore; 29 - Cooper Williams - Freshman; 32 - Kade Anderson - Sophomore; 34 - Chase Shores - (redshirt) Sophomore; 35 - Jacob Mayers - Junior; 40 - Chandler Dorsey - Junior; 41 - DJ Primeaux - (redshirt) Sophomore; 43 - Connor Benge - Junior; 45 - Deven Sheerin - Sophomore; 48 - Mavrick Rizy - Freshman; 52 - Grant Fontenot - (redshirt) Junior; 55 - Conner Ware - Junior	Catchers: 0 - Cade Arrambide - Freshman; 28 - Blaise Priester - (redshirt) Junior; 30 - Edward Yamin IV - Junior; Infielders: 4 - Steven Milam - Sophomore; 5 - Tanner Reaves - (redshirt) Junior; 10 - Michael Braswell III - Senior; 14 - Daniel Dickinson - Junior; 17 - Mikey Ryan - Freshman; 18 - David Hogg II - Freshman	Outfielders: 1 - Chris Stanfield - Junior; 6 - Derek Curiel - Freshman; 11 - Josh Pearson - Senior; 13 - Mic Paul - (redshirt) Sophomore; 16 - Ethan Frey - Junior; 22 - Jared Jones - Junior; 38 - Ryan Costello - Freshman; 44 - Ashton Larson - Sophomore; 47 - John Pearson - Freshman; Utility: 7 - Jake Brown - Sophomore; 20 - Casan Evans - Freshman; 23 - Luis Hernandez - Senior; 33 - Dalton Beck - Senior; 51 - Dylan Thompson - (redshirt) Freshman

=== Coaching staff ===
2025 LSU Tigers baseball coaching staff
Name	Position	Seasons at LSU	Alma mater
Jay Johnson	Head coach	4	Point Loma Nazarene University (2001)
Josh Jordan	Assistant coach	3	Catawba College (2003)
Josh Simpson	Assistant coach	4	Northwestern Oklahoma State University (2003)
Marc Wanaka	Hitting coach	4	Bronte International University (2008)
Nate Yeskie	Pitching coach	2	University of Nevada, Las Vegas (2003)

== Offseason ==
=== Departures ===
Offseason departures
Name	Number	Pos.	Height	Weight	Year	Hometown	Notes
Ben Nippolt	5	INF	5 ft 11 in (1.80 m)	180	Sr.	St. Paul, Minnesota	
Alex Milazzo	7	C	5 ft 11 in (1.80 m)	190	Gr.	Zachary, Louisiana	
Hayden Travinski	8	C/1B	6 ft 3 in (1.91 m)	228	Gr.	Shreveport, Louisiana	
Mac Bingham	9	OF	5 ft 11 in (1.80 m)	182	Sr.	San Diego, California	
Will Hellmers	48	RHP	6 ft 4 in (1.93 m)	213	Sr.	Metairie, Louisiana	
Javen Coleman	49	LHP	6 ft 2 in (1.88 m)	200	RS-Jr.	Richmond, Texas	
Jack Merrifield	53	INF	6 ft 2 in (1.88 m)	195	5th Year-Sr.	Prairieville, Louisiana	

==== Outgoing transfers ====
Outgoing transfers
Name	Number	Pos.	Height	Weight	Hometown	Year	New school	Source
Aiden Moffett	0	RHP	6 ft 3 in (1.91 m)	221	Mount Olive, Mississippi	So.	Texas	
Nic Bronzini	14	LHP	6 ft 3 in (1.91 m)	256	San Ramon, California	RS-Fr.	Washington	
Brady Neal	16	C	5 ft 10 in (1.78 m)	193	Tallahassee, Florida	So.	Alabama	
Samuel Dutton	17	RHP	5 ft 11 in (1.80 m)	200	Southside, Alabama	Jr.	Auburn	
Ryan Kucherak	20	INF	6 ft 1 in (1.85 m)	186	Chandler, Arizona	Fr.	Northwestern	
Austen Roellig	24	INF	5 ft 11 in (1.80 m)	185	Rancho Cucamonga, California	Fr.	Utah	
Paxton Kling	28	OF	6 ft 2 in (1.88 m)	203	Roaring Spring, Pennsylvania	So.	Penn State	
Micah Bucknam	29	RHP	6 ft 2 in (1.88 m)	214	Abbotsford, British Columbia, Canada	So.	Dallas Baptist	
Zeb Ruddell	39	OF	6 ft 1 in (1.85 m)	187	Monroe, Louisiana	RS-Fr.	Louisiana Tech	
Derrick Mitchell	43	OF	6 ft 3 in (1.91 m)	203	Plano, Texas	Fr.	Austin Peay	
Cam Johnson	55	LHP	6 ft 5 in (1.96 m)	251	Upper Marlboro, Maryland	Fr.	Oklahoma	

==== 2024 MLB draft ====
2024 LSU Draft Class
Round	Pick	Overall pick	Player	Position	MLB team	Source
2	1	40	Tommy White	3B	Oakland Athletics	
CB-B	6	71	Luke Holman	RHP	Cincinnati Reds	
CB-B	8	73	Gage Jump	LHP	Oakland Athletics	
3	15	89	Thatcher Hurd	RHP	New York Yankees	
6	16	181	Griffin Herring	LHP	New York Yankees	
7	3	198	Fidel Ulloa	RHP	Kansas City Royals	
10	2	287	Nate Ackenhausen	LHP	Kansas City Royals	
11	18	333	Christian Little	RHP	Seattle Mariners	
13	3	378	Justin Loer	LHP	Colorado Rockies	

=== Acquisitions ===
==== Incoming transfers ====
Incoming transfers
Name	Number	Pos.	Height	Weight	Hometown	Year	Previous school	Source
Chris Stanfield	1	OF	6 ft 2 in (1.88 m)	195	Tallahassee, Florida	Jr.	Auburn	
Daniel Dickinson	14	INF	6 ft 0 in (1.83 m)	200	Richland, Washington	Jr.	Utah Valley	
Luis Hernandez	23	U	6 ft 1 in (1.85 m)	190	Gurabo, Puerto Rico	Sr.	Indiana State	
Anthony Eyanson	24	RHP	6 ft 2 in (1.88 m)	208	Lakewood, California	Jr.	UC San Diego	
Zac Cowan	26	RHP	5 ft 11 in (1.80 m)	203	Blythewood, South Carolina	Jr.	Wofford	
Blaise Priester	28	C	6 ft 1 in (1.85 m)	220	Denham Springs, Louisiana	RS-Jr.	Meridian CC	
Edward Yamin IV	30	C/1B	6 ft 5 in (1.96 m)	207	West Sand Lake, New York	Jr.	Dayton	
Dalton Beck	33	OF/1B/LHP	6 ft 2 in (1.88 m)	200	Frisco, Texas	Sr.	Incarnate Word	
Jacob Mayers	35	RHP	6 ft 5 in (1.96 m)	220	Gonzales, Louisiana	Jr.	Nicholls	
Chandler Dorsey	40	RHP	6 ft 4 in (1.93 m)	231	Lakeland, Florida	Jr.	South Florida	
Connor Benge	43	RHP	6 ft 0 in (1.83 m)	194	Montgomery, Texas	Jr.	Dallas Baptist	
Deven Sheerin	45	RHP	6 ft 5 in (1.96 m)	245	Reading, Pennsylvania	So.	Mount St. Mary's	
Grant Fontenot	52	RHP	6 ft 3 in (1.91 m)	225	Lafayette, Louisiana	RS-Jr.	Texas	
Conner Ware	55	LHP	6 ft 4 in (1.93 m)	221	Madison, Mississippi	Jr.	Pearl River CC	

==== Incoming recruits ====
2024 LSU Recruits
Name	Number	B/T	Pos.	Height	Weight	Hometown	High School	Source
Cade Arrambide	0	R/R	C	6 ft 3 in (1.91 m)	204	Tomball, Texas	Tomball	
Derek Curiel	6	L/L	OF	6 ft 2 in (1.88 m)	182	West Covina, California	Orange Lutheran	
William Schmidt	9	R/R	RHP	6 ft 4 in (1.93 m)	188	Baton Rouge, Louisiana	Catholic	
Mikey Ryan	17	R/R	INF	6 ft 0 in (1.83 m)	195	Luling, Louisiana	Archbishop Rummel	
David Hogg II	18	S/R	INF	6 ft 2 in (1.88 m)	195	Mansfield, Texas	Mansfield	
Casan Evans	20	R/R	RHP/U	6 ft 4 in (1.93 m)	194	Houston, Texas	St. Pius X	
Cooper Williams	29	L/L	LHP	6 ft 4 in (1.93 m)	200	Alvin, Texas	Alvin	
Ryan Costello	38	L/L	1B	6 ft 3 in (1.91 m)	203	Howell, New Jersey	Ranney School	
John Pearson	47	R/R	OF/3B	6 ft 0 in (1.83 m)	248	West Monroe, Louisiana	West Monroe	
Mavrick Rizy	48	R/R	RHP	6 ft 9 in (2.06 m)	253	Fiskdale, Massachusetts	Worcester Academy	

== Game log ==
2025 LSU Tigers baseball game log (52–15)
Regular season (42–13)

February (9–1)
Date	TV	Opponent	Rank	Stadium	Score	Win	Loss	Save	Attendance	Overall	SEC	Source
February 14	SECN+	Purdue Fort Wayne*	No. 3	Alex Box Stadium; Baton Rouge, LA	**W** 14–0	**Anderson** (1–0)	Fischer (0–1)	None	11,456	1–0	—	Report
February 15	SECN+	Purdue Fort Wayne*	No. 3	Alex Box Stadium	**W** 10–1	**Eyanson** (1–0)	Danielson (0–1)	None	10,964	2–0	—	Report
February 16	SECN+	Purdue Fort Wayne*	No. 3	Alex Box Stadium	**W** 8–1	**Shores** (1–0)	Walters (0–1)	None	10,803	3–0	—	Report
February 18	SECN+	Southern*	No. 3	Alex Box Stadium	**W** 13–1^{7}	**Ware** (1–0)	Prosper (0–1)	None	9,720	4–0	—	Report
February 21	SECN+	Omaha*	No. 3	Alex Box Stadium	**W** 4–2	**Anderson** (2–0)	Curtis (0–1)	**Evans** (1)	10,343	5–0	—	Report
February 22	SECN+	Omaha*	No. 3	Alex Box Stadium	**L** 3–4	Gainer (2–0)	**Fontenot** (0–1)	Dreher (1)	10,318	5–1	—	Report
February 22	SECN+	Omaha*	No. 3	Alex Box Stadium	**W** 12–1	**Shores** (2–0)	Hood (0–2)	None	10,120	6–1	—	Report
February 24	SECN+	Nicholls*	No. 2	Alex Box Stadium	**W** 13–3^{7}	**Schmidt** (1–0)	Harper (1–1)	None	10,030	7–1	—	Report
College Baseball Series at Globe Life Field
February 26	FloSports	vs. No. 19 Dallas Baptist*	No. 2	Globe Life Field; Arlington, TX	**W** 7–3	**Cowan** (1–0)	Borberg (0–1)	**Evans** (2)	5,794	8–1	—	Report
Friso College Baseball Classic
February 28	D1B+	vs. Kansas State*	No. 2	Riders Field; Frisco, TX	**W** 8–5^{10}	**Evans** (1–0)	Dean (1–1)	None	N/A	9–1	—	Report

March (17–2)
Date	TV	Opponent	Rank	Stadium	Score	Win	Loss	Save	Attendance	Overall	SEC	Source
Friso College Baseball Classic
March 1	D1B+	vs. Nebraska*	No. 2	Riders Field	**W** 11–6	**Eyanson** (2–0)	Jasa (0–1)	None	11,003	10–1	—	Report
March 2	D1B+	vs. Sam Houston State*	No. 2	Riders Field	**W** 12–8	**Shores** (3–0)	Zaruba (0–1)	**Noot** (1)	6,876	11–1	—	Report
March 4	SECN+	North Dakota State*	No. 1	Alex Box Stadium	**W** 11–9	**Cowan** (2–0)	Lachenmayer (0–1)	**Evans** (3)	9,892	12–1	—	Report
March 5	SECN+	North Dakota State*	No. 1	Alex Box Stadium	**W** 13–3^{7}	**Schmidt** (2–0)	Shupe (0–1)	None	10,446	13–1	—	Report
March 7	SECN+	North Alabama*	No. 1	Alex Box Stadium	**W** 13–2^{7}	**Anderson** (3–0)	Parrish (0–4)	None	10,747	14–1	—	Report
March 8	SECN+	North Alabama*	No. 1	Alex Box Stadium	**W** 6–2	**Eyanson** (3–0)	Patterson (1–2)	**Cowan** (1)	10,226	15–1	—	Report
March 9	SECN+	North Alabama*	No. 1	Alex Box Stadium	**W** 11–5	**Shores** (4–0)	Pingeton (1–2)	None	10,817	16–1	—	Report
March 11	SECN+	Xavier*	No. 1	Alex Box Stadium	**W** 18–4^{7}	**Schmidt** (3–0)	DeTienne (0–1)	None	10,266	17–1	—	Report
March 14	WBRZ	Missouri	No. 1	Alex Box Stadium	**W** 12–5	**Anderson** (4–0)	Lohse (0–3)	None	11,741	18–1	1–0	Report
March 15	SECN+	Missouri	No. 1	Alex Box Stadium	**W** 7–6	**Ware** (2–0)	Libbert (1–2)	**Evans** (4)	11,675	19–1	2–0	Report
March 16	SECN+	Missouri	No. 1	Alex Box Stadium	**W** 10–5	**Ware** (3–0)	Drew (2–1)	None	10,803	20–1	3–0	Report
March 18	SECN+	New Orleans*	No. 2	Alex Box Stadium	**W** 11–1^{7}	**Noot** (1–0)	Clayton (1–1)	None	10,424	21–1	—	Report
March 21	SECN	at No. 8 Texas	No. 2	UFCU Disch–Falk Field; Austin, TX	**W** 8–2	**Anderson** (5–0)	Spencer (2–1)	**Cowan** (2)	6,838	22–1	4–0	Report
March 22	SECN+	at No. 8 Texas	No. 2	UFCU Disch–Falk Field	**L** 7–11	Grubbs (2–0)	**Benge** (0–1)	Volantis (4)	7,100	22–2	4–1	Report
March 23	SECN+	at No. 8 Texas	No. 2	UFCU Disch–Falk Field	**L** 2–6	Riojas (5–1)	**Shores** (4–1)	Volantis (5)	7,211	22–3	4–2	Report
March 25	SECN+	Louisiana*	No. 8	Alex Box Stadium	**W** 17–4^{7}	**Noot** (2–0)	Hermann (2–2)	None	11,511	23–3	—	Report
March 27	SECN	Mississippi State	No. 8	Alex Box Stadium	**W** 8–6	**Benge** (1–1)	Burns (1–1)	**Cowan** (3)	11,192	24–3	5–2	Report
March 28	SECN+	Mississippi State	No. 8	Alex Box Stadium	**W** 2–1	**Eyanson** (4–0)	Kohn (4–1)	**Evans** (5)	11,507	25–3	6–2	Report
March 29	SECN+	Mississippi State	No. 8	Alex Box Stadium	**W** 17–8	**Ware** (4–0)	Ligon (2–4)	None	11,303	26–3	7–2	Report

April (11–6)
Date	TV	Opponent	Rank	Stadium	Score	Win	Loss	Save	Attendance	Overall	SEC	Source
April 1	SECN+	Louisiana Tech*	No. 7	Alex Box Stadium	**W** 12–3	**Schmidt** (4–0)	Nation (1–2)	None	10,484	27–3	—	Report
April 3	ESPN2	at No. 10 Oklahoma	No. 7	L. Dale Mitchell Park; Norman, OK	**W** 2–0	**Anderson** (6–0)	K. Witherspoon (5–2)	None	3,107	28–3	8–2	Report
April 4	SECN+	at No. 10 Oklahoma	No. 7	L. Dale Mitchell Park	**W** 10–2	**Eyanson** (5–0)	Crossland (1–2)	**Evans** (6)	3,258	29–3	9–2	Report
April 5	SECN+	at No. 10 Oklahoma	No. 7	L. Dale Mitchell Park	**W** 3–2	**Shores** (5–1)	M. Witherspoon (2–3)	**Cowan** (4)	2,723	30–3	10–2	Report
April 8	ESPN+	at Nicholls*	No. 3	Ray Didier Field; Thibodaux, LA	**W** 5–3	**Schmidt** (5–0)	Poirrier (0–1)	None	1,550	31–3	—	Report
April 11	SECN+	at No. 11 Auburn	No. 3	Plainsman Park; Auburn, AL	**L** 4–8	Dutton (5–2)	**Anderson** (6–1)	None	6,756	31–4	10–3	Report
April 12	SECN+	at No. 11 Auburn	No. 3	Plainsman Park	**L** 2–4	Fisher (1–0)	**Eyanson** (5–1)	Hetzler (4)	7,231	31–5	10–4	Report
April 13	SECN+	at No. 11 Auburn	No. 3	Plainsman Park	**L** 2–3	Graves (3–1)	**Shores** (5–2)	Watts (1)	5,132	31–6	10–5	Report
April 15	SECN+	McNeese*	No. 9	Alex Box Stadium	**W** 10–3	**Schmidt** (6–0)	Parker (1–1)	None	10,756	32–6	—	Report
April 17	SECN+	No. 15 Alabama	No. 9	Alex Box Stadium	**W** 11–6	**Evans** (2–0)	Blackwood (2–1)	**Cowan** (5)	11,654	33–6	11–5	Report
April 18	SECN+	No. 15 Alabama	No. 9	Alex Box Stadium	**W** 4–3	**Eyanson** (6–1)	Quick (5–2)	**Cowan** (6)	12,278	34–6	12–5	Report
April 19	SECN	No. 15 Alabama	No. 9	Alex Box Stadium	**L** 4–7	Adams (5–2)	**Ware** (4–1)	Ozmer (13)	11,833	34–7	12–6	Report
April 22	SECN+	Northwestern State*	No. 7	Alex Box Stadium	**L** 3–13^{7}	Leonard (3–2)	**Williams** (0–1)	None	10,634	34–8	—	Report
April 25	SECN+	No. 6 Tennessee	No. 7	Alex Box Stadium	**W** 6–3	**Mayers** (1–0)	Snead (3–1)	None	12,919	35–8	13–6	Report
April 26	ESPNU	No. 6 Tennessee	No. 7	Alex Box Stadium	**L** 3–9	Phillips (3–3)	**Eyanson** (6–2)	Loy (2)	13,376	35–9	13–7	Report
April 27	SECN	No. 6 Tennessee	No. 7	Alex Box Stadium	**W** 12–2^{8}	**Evans** (3–0)	Sharman (2–1)	None	11,847	36–9	14–7	Report
April 29	SECN+	Southeastern Louisiana*	No. 2	Alex Box Stadium	**W** 15–2^{7}	**Schmidt** (7–0)	Ambrose (2–1)	None	10,821	37–9	—	Report

May (5–4)
Date	TV	Opponent	Rank	Stadium	Score	Win	Loss	Save	Attendance	Overall	SEC	Source
May 3	SECN+	at Texas A&M	No. 2	Olsen Field at Blue Bell Park; College Station, TX	**L** 1–3	Prager (3–3)	**Cowan** (2–1)	Wilson (1)	7,768	37–10	14–8	Report
May 3	SECN+	at Texas A&M	No. 2	Olsen Field at Blue Bell Park	**W** 2–1	**Eyanson** (7–2)	Lamkin (3–6)	None	7,271	38–10	15–8	Report
May 4	SECN+	at Texas A&M	No. 2	Olsen Field at Blue Bell Park	**L** 4–6	Moss (6–2)	**Cowan** (2–2)	None	7,233	38–11	15–9	Report
May 6	SECN+	Grambling State*	No. 3	Alex Box Stadium	Canceled due to forecasted inclement weather							
May 9	SECN+	No. 7 Arkansas	No. 3	Alex Box Stadium	**W** 5–4^{10}	**Cowan** (3–2)	Gaeckle (4–2)	None	11,658	39–11	16–9	Report
May 10	SECN	No. 7 Arkansas	No. 3	Alex Box Stadium	**W** 13–3^{7}	**Eyanson** (8–2)	Wood (1–1)	None	12,264	40–11	17–9	Report
May 11	SECN	No. 7 Arkansas	No. 3	Alex Box Stadium	**L** 4–7	Carter (6–0)	**Evans** (3–1)	Coil (1)	11,079	40–12	17–10	Report
May 15	SECN	at South Carolina	No. 1	Founders Park; Columbia, SC	**L** 5–6	Becker (3–3)	**Cowan** (3–3)	None	6,841	40–13	17–11	Report
May 16	SECN+	at South Carolina	No. 1	Founders Park	**W** 8–1	**Anderson** (7–1)	McCoy (4–5)	None	7,225	41–13	18–11	Report
May 17	SECN+	at South Carolina	No. 1	Founders Park	**W** 7–3	**Eyanson** (9–2)	Eskew (0–4)	None	7,145	42–13	19–11	Report

Postseason (10–2)

SEC tournament (1–1)
Date	TV	Opponent	Rank	Stadium	Score	Win	Loss	Save	Attendance	Overall	SECT Record	Source
May 23	SECN	vs. (14) Texas A&M	(3) No. 1	Hoover Metropolitan Stadium; Hoover, AL	**W** 4–3	**Anderson** (8–1)	Patton (3–5)	**Eyanson** (1)	13,627	43–13	1–0	Report
May 24	SECN	vs. (7) No. 17 Ole Miss	(3) No. 1	Hoover Metropolitan Stadium	**L** 0–2	Dennis (4–1)	**Noot** (2–1)	Spencer (1)	14,775	43–14	1–1	Report

Baton Rouge Regional (3–1)
Date	TV	Opponent	Rank	Stadium	Score	Win	Loss	Save	Attendance	Overall	NCAA record	Source
May 30	SECN	(4) Little Rock	(1) No. 3	Alex Box Stadium; Baton Rouge, LA	**W** 7–0	**Eyanson** (10–2)	Wells (3–7)	None	11,678	44–14	1–0	Report
May 31	ESPNU	(2) Dallas Baptist	(1) No. 3	Alex Box Stadium	**W** 12–0	**Anderson** (9–1)	Bucknam (6–2)	None	11,884	45–14	2–0	Report
June 1	ESPNU	(4) Little Rock	(1) No. 3	Alex Box Stadium	**L** 4–10	Katz (1–0)	**Shores** (5–3)	Brown (1)	11,510	45–15	2–1	Report
June 2	ESPN	(4) Little Rock	(1) No. 3	Alex Box Stadium	**W** 10–6	**Evans** (4–1)	Wells (3–8)	**Eyanson** (1)	11,656	46–15	3–1	Report

Baton Rouge Super Regional (2–0)
Date	TV	Opponent	Rank	Stadium	Score	Win	Loss	Save	Attendance	Overall	NCAA record	Source
June 7	ESPN	West Virginia	(1) No. 3	Alex Box Stadium	**W** 16–9	**Anderson** (10–1)	Kirn (5–3)	None	12,093	47–15	4–1	Report
June 8	ESPNU	West Virginia	(1) No. 3	Alex Box Stadium	**W** 12–5	**Eyanson** (11–2)	Kartsonas (6–4)	None	12,301	48–15	5–1	Report

Men's College World Series (5–0)
Date	TV	Opponent	Rank	Stadium	Score	Win	Loss	Save	Attendance	Overall	NCAA record	Source
June 14	ESPN	(3) No. 6 Arkansas	(6) No. 3	Charles Schwab Field; Omaha, NE	**W** 4–1	**Anderson** (11–1)	Root (8–6)	**Evans** (7)	25,464	49–15	6–1	
June 16	ESPN	(15) No. 13 UCLA	(6) No. 3	Charles Schwab Field	**W** 9–5	**Evans** (5–1)	Stump (6–2)	**Shores** (1)	24,623	50–15	7–1	
June 18	ESPN	(3) No. 6 Arkansas	(6) No. 3	Charles Schwab Field	**W** 6–5	**Mayers** (2–0)	Gibler (3–2)	None	25,740	51–15	8–1	
June 21	ESPN	(13) No. 11 Coastal Carolina	(6) No. 3	Charles Schwab Field	**W** 1–0	**Anderson** (12–1)	Flukey (8–2)	None	25,761	52–15	9–1	
June 22	ABC	(13) No. 11 Coastal Carolina	(6) No. 3	Charles Schwab Field	**W** 5–3	**Eyanson** (12–2)	Morrison (12–1)	**Shores** (2)	24,734	53–15	10–1	

Legend: = Win = Loss = Canceled
Bold = LSU team member * Non-conference game
Rankings are based on the team's current ranking in the D1Baseball poll.

== Record vs. conference opponents ==
Blank are not scheduled. Blue are home games, otherwise away.

2025 SEC baseball records Source: 2025 SEC baseball game results, 2025 SEC baseball schedule
Tm	W–L	ALA	ARK	AUB	FLA	UGA	KEN	LSU	MSU	MIZ	OKL	OMS	SCA	TEN	TEX	TAM	VAN	Tm	SR	SW
ALA	16–14		.	1–2	1–2	2–1	.	1–2	1–2	3–0	2–1	.	.	1–2	.	3–0	1–2	ALA	4–6	2–0
ARK	20–10	.		.	1–2	1–2	.	1–2	.	3–0	.	2–1	3–0	2–1	3–0	1–2	3–0	ARK	6–4	4–0
AUB	17–13	2–1	.		.	0–3	2–1	3–0	2–1	.	.	1–2	3–0	2–1	0–3	.	2–1	AUB	7–3	2–2
FLA	15–15	2–1	2–1	.		0–3	.	.	2–1	3–0	.	1–2	3–0	0–3	2–1	.	0–3	FLA	6–4	2–3
UGA	18–12	1–2	2–1	3–0	3–0		2–1	.	.	3–0	2–1	.	.	.	0–3	2–1	0–3	UGA	7–3	3–2
KEN	13–17	.	.	1–2	.	1–2		.	0–3	.	3–0	1–2	2–1	2–1	1–2	2–1	0–3	KEN	4–6	1–2
LSU	19–11	2–1	2–1	0–3	.	.	.		3–0	3–0	3–0	.	2–1	2–1	1–2	1–2	.	LSU	7–3	3–1
MSU	15–15	2–1	.	1–2	1–2	.	3–0	0–3		3–0	1–2	2–1	2–1	.	0–3	.	.	MSU	5–5	2–2
MIZ	3–27	0–3	0–3	.	0–3	0–3	.	0–3	0–3		0–3	0–3	.	.	0–3	3–0	.	MIZ	1–9	1–9
OKL	14–16	1–2	.	.	.	1–2	0–3	0–3	2–1	3–0		2–1	2–1	.	1–2	.	2–1	OKL	5–5	1–2
OMS	16–14	.	1–2	2–1	2–1	.	2–1	.	1–2	3–0	1–2		1–2	1–2	.	.	2–1	OMS	5–5	1–0
SCA	6–24	.	0–3	0–3	0–3	.	1–2	1–2	1–2	.	1–2	2–1		0–3	.	0–3	.	SCA	1–9	0–5
TEN	16–14	2–1	1–2	1–2	3–0	.	1–2	1–2	.	.	.	2–1	3–0		.	1–2	1–2	TEN	4–6	2–0
TEX	22–8	.	0–3	3–0	1–2	3–0	2–1	2–1	3–0	3–0	2–1	.	.	.		3–0	.	TEX	8–2	5–1
TAM	11–19	0–3	2–1	.	.	1–2	1–2	2–1	.	0–3	.	.	3–0	2–1	0–3		0–3	TAM	4–6	1–4
VAN	19–11	2–1	0–3	1–2	3–0	3–0	3–0	.	.	.	1–2	1–2	.	2–1	.	3–0		VAN	6–4	4–1
Tm	W–L	ALA	ARK	AUB	FLA	UGA	KEN	LSU	MSU	MIZ	OKL	OMS	SCA	TEN	TEX	TAM	VAN	Team	SR	SW

Updated for entire regular season.
Tie brkrs: LSU>VAN ARK common, OMS>TEN & OMS>ALA VAN common, TEN>ALA hd to hd, FLA>MSU hd to hd.

== Rankings ==
Ranking movements Legend: ██ Increase in ranking ██ Decrease in ranking ( ) = First-place votes
	Week																		
Poll	Pre	1	2	3	4	5	6	7	8	9	10	11	12	13	14	15	16	17	Final
Coaches'	3	3*	3	2 (3)	2 (3)	2	6	6	3	7	5	2	4	1 (19)	1 (22)	3 (9)			
Baseball America	2	2	3	2	2	2	5	5	3	8	5	2	6	1	1	1*			
NCBWA†	4	3	3	4	2	2	5	5	3	8	5	4	3	1	1	1			
D1Baseball	3	3	2	1	1	2	8	7	3	9	7	2	3	1	1	3			
Perfect Game	2	2	2	2	2	2	7	7	4	10	3	2	4	1	1	1*			

† NCBWA ranks 30 teams in their preseason poll, but only ranks 25 teams weekly during the season.
* A new poll was not released for this week, so for comparison purposes, the previous week's ranking is inserted in this week's slot.
