= 2025 Houston Christian Huskies baseball team =

American college baseball season

2025 Houston Christian Huskies baseball
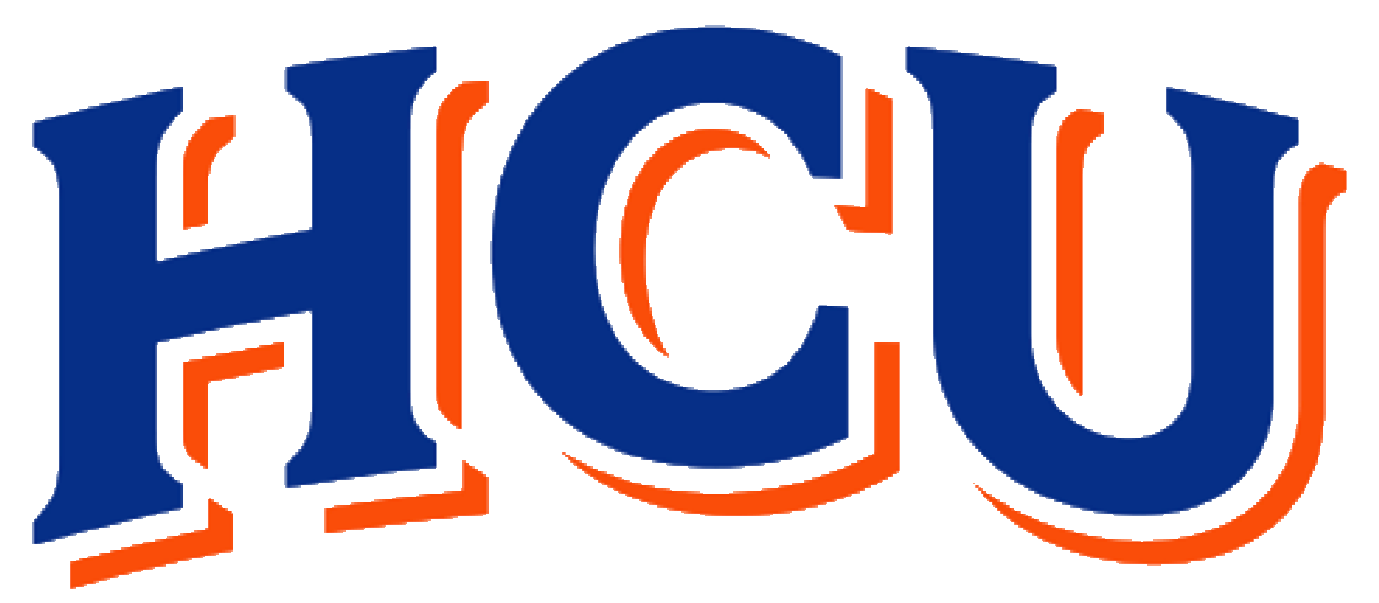

Southland Conference tournament champions

Austin Regional, 0–2
- Conference: Southland Conference
- Record: 32–25 (17–13 Southland)
- Head coach: Clay VanderLaan (1st season)
- Assistant coaches: Ryan Lousteau (asst. head); John Cannon; Ryan Farney; Drew Decker (graduate asst.)
- Home stadium: Husky Field

2025 Southland Conference baseball standings
	Conf.				Overall
Team	W		L	PCT	W		L	PCT
Southeastern Louisiana ‍†‍‍	22	–	8	.733	38	–	16	.704
UT Rio Grande Valley ‍†‍‍	22	–	8	.733	36	–	18	.667
Lamar ‍‍‍	20	–	10	.667	40	–	17	.702
McNeese ‍‍‍	19	–	11	.633	31	–	17	.646
Northwestern State ‍‍‍	19	–	11	.633	35	–	21	.625
Houston Christian ‍‍‡‍^{y}	17	–	13	.567	32	–	25	.561
New Orleans ‍‍‍	12	–	18	.400	28	–	26	.519
Texas A&M–Corpus Christi ‍‍‍	12	–	18	.400	21	–	31	.404
Nicholls ‍‍‍	10	–	20	.333	17	–	32	.347
Stephen F. Austin ‍‍‍	9	–	21	.300	18	–	31	.367
Incarnate Word ‍‍‍	3	–	27	.100	17	–	33	.340
† – Conference champion ‡ – Tournament champion y – Invited to the NCAA Tournament; As of May 31, 2025; Rankings from D1Baseball

The 2025 Houston Christian Huskies baseball team represented Houston Christian University during the 2025 NCAA Division I baseball season. The Huskies played their home games at Husky Field and were led by first-year head coach Clay VanderLaan. They are members of the Southland Conference. The Huskies won the Southland Conference Tournament Championship for the second time in program history on May 23, earning an automatic bid for the 2025 NCAA Division I baseball tournament.

== Previous season ==
The Huskies had a regular season record of 18–31 and a conference record of 9–15 finishing in ninth place in SLC play, their second straight last place finish. They did not qualify for the 2024 Southland Conference baseball tournament. Head coach Lance Berkman resigned on May 24 following the conclusion of the 2024 season, and then-assistant coach Clay VanderLaan was hired as the new head coach on June 11. VanderLaan was previously a head coach at Saginaw Valley State for part of the 2018 season and at St. Thomas (TX) from 2020 to 2021.

== Preseason ==
=== Southland Conference Preseason Poll ===
The Huskies were picked to finish tenth out of eleven in the Southland Conference with 37 votes in the Preseason Poll released on February 6, 2025.

Coaches poll
Predicted finish	Team	Votes (1st place)
1	Lamar	197 (18)
2	Southeastern Louisiana	146 (4)
3	McNeese	145
4	UT Rio Grande Valley	144
5	Nicholls	129
6	New Orleans	128
7	Incarnate Word	95
8	Northwestern State	89
9	Texas A&M–Corpus Christi	73
10	Houston Christian	37
11	Stephen F. Austin	27

=== Preseason All-Southland team ===
Parker Edwards, starting pitcher for the Huskies, was named to the conference preseason second team.

==== First Team ====
- Zak Skinner* (LU, JR, Catcher)
- Brayden Evans* (LU, JR, 1st Base)
- Isaac Webb* (TAMU, SR, 2nd Base)
- TJ Salvaggio (SELU, SR, Shortstop)
- Rocco Gump (NWST, SR, 3rd Base)
- Reese Lipoma* (NWST, RSR, Outfielder)
- Connor Westenburg (McN, SR, Outfielder)
- Cole Stromboe+ (SELU, RSR, Outfielder)
- Tristian Moore+ (UNO, RSR, Outfielder)
- Bryce Calloway* (UNO, SR, Utility)
- Rey Mendoza (UIW, GR, Designated Hitter)
- Brennan Stuprich* (SELU, RSR, Starting Pitcher)
- Josh Salinas (UIW, GR, Starting Pitcher)
- Zach Garcia (TAMU, SR, Starting Pitcher)
- Kyle Moseley (LU, SR, Relief Pitcher)

*-2024 Southland All-Conference Selection
+-Tie for final spot

==== Second Team ====
- Steven Lancia (UTRGV, SR, Catcher)
- Martin Vazquez (UTRGV, SR, 1st Base)
- Diego Villsecas* (UNO, SR, 2nd Base)
- Isaac Lopez (UTRGV, GR, Shortstop)
- Easton Moomau+ (UTRGV, SO, 3rd Base)
- Matt Ryan+ (LU, SR, 3rd Base)
- Balin Valentine (NWST, SR, Outfielder)
- Parker Coley (SELU, SR, Outfielder)
- Jude Hall (SELU, SR, Outfielder)
- Simon Larranaga (MCN, SR, Utility)
- Armani Raygoza (UTRGV, RSO, Designated Hitter)
- Parker Edwards (HCU, SR, Starting Pitcher)
- Angelo Cabral (UTRGV, GR, Starting Pitcher)
- Tyler Bryan (NWST, JR, Starting Pitcher)
- Larson Fabre (SELU, JR, Relief Pitcher)

*-2024 Southland All-Conference Selection
+-Tie for final spot

== Regular season ==
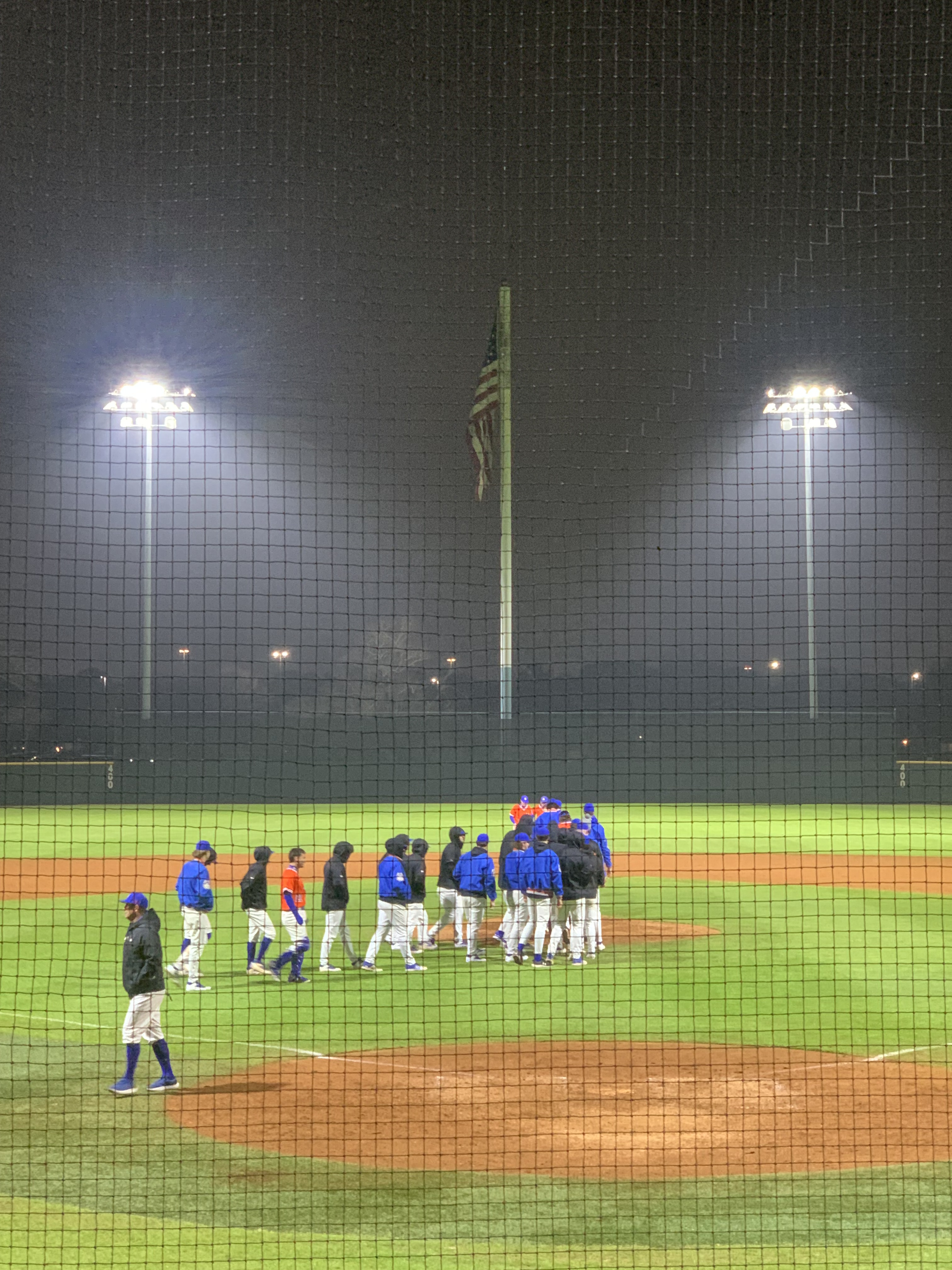
The Huskies played their first night home game in program history on February 14, 2025.

This season was notable for the program in that their home field, Husky Field, could only support daytime games prior to 2025. This changed when lights were installed and powered around the ballpark in January. History was set on February 14, 2025 in game two of a doubleheader against Central Michigan when Houston Christian played their first night home game in program history, winning 5–0 over the Chippewas. The Huskies would begin Southland Conference play by sweeping Incarnate Word and winning two of three against McNeese State. Conference play success continued in late-March with series wins over UTRGV and Stephen F. Austin. Their momentum continued from early to mid-April with Southland series wins over Nicholls and Northwestern State. The Huskies were tied with two other teams for first place in the conference following the conclusion of the Northwestern State series.

However, after an April 15 midweek loss to Texas State, the Huskies would face their first adversity by suffering a three-game sweep to New Orleans. Their woes would continue with a home series loss to Southeastern Louisiana. HCU would end April on a high note with a midweek non-conference victory at home versus Tarleton State and by winning two of three to Southland opponent Texas A&M-Corpus Christi at home to begin May. Lamar would sweep the Huskies to end regular season conference play.

Having been picked to finish 10th of 11 in the Southland Conference Preseason Poll, Houston Christian exceeded expectations by achieving sixth place and qualifying for the Southland Conference Tournament for the first time since 2022. They had their first winning conference record in a full season since 2018 and their first winning season since 2017, which was guaranteed on May 13 with a victory over Sam Houston State. HCU baseball also achieved their first 30-win season since 2013.

== Postseason ==
The Huskies qualified for the Southland Conference Tournament for the first time since 2022. They played the first part of the tournament at UTRGV in the Edinburg Bracket as the #6 overall seed. They upset Lamar with a 6–3 victory in the first round considering the Cardinals swept them only one week prior. HCU won the next two games against the host UTRGV Vaqueros to advance to the SLC Championship Series. In the Hammond Bracket hosted by Southeastern Louisiana, #8-seed New Orleans defeated Northwestern State in the semifinal round. Houston Christian hosted the best-of-three championship series as they were the highest remaining seed. The Huskies won game one, 8–3, against New Orleans (who swept HCU in the regular season series) by jumping out to a 7–0 lead, which included a five-run fourth. Game two featured a shootout as the Huskies played as the away team despite the series being played at Husky Field. The Huskies won, 16–11, despite two four-run innings achieved by the Privateers in the third and eighth innings, clinching the Southland Conference Tournament championship for the first time since 2015.

Houston Christian qualified for the NCAA Division I Regional for the first time since 2015. They competed in the Austin Regional, hosted by the University of Texas, as the #4 and bottom seed. They lost to the host Longhorns, 7–1, in game one on May 30. They would also lose to #3-seed Kansas State the following day by a score of 7–3, ending their season.

== Roster ==
2025 Houston Christian Huskies baseball team
Players
Coaches

#	Pos.	Name	B/T	Height	Weight	Year	Home town
1	OF	Kennath Dutka	L/L	5 ft 11 in (1.8 m)	180 lb (82 kg)	Sr	Richmond, TX
2	OF	Ayden Slott	R/R	5 ft 10 in (1.78 m)	180 lb (82 kg)	Jr	Willis, TX
3	P	Caleb Matthews	R/R	5 ft 10 in (1.78 m)	175 lb (79 kg)	Sr	Katy, TX
4	C	Tevis Payne	R/R	5 ft 10 in (1.78 m)	175 lb (79 kg)	Sr	San Jose, CA
5	INF	Jeremy Rader	R/R	6 ft 0 in (1.83 m)	185 lb (84 kg)	Sr	Springfield, MO
6	INF	Matthew Leiterman	R/R	6 ft 1 in (1.85 m)	175 lb (79 kg)	Jr	Woodland Hills, CA
7	INF	Robert Oropeza	R/R	6 ft 0 in (1.83 m)	190 lb (86 kg)	Jr	Tomball, TX
8	OF	Walker Bazile	L/L	5 ft 9 in (1.75 m)	175 lb (79 kg)	Jr	Kenner, LA
9	INF	Trevor Roper	R/R	6 ft 0 in (1.83 m)	165 lb (75 kg)	Sr	Midland, TX
10	P	Kyler Mentzel	R/R	6 ft 2 in (1.88 m)	190 lb (86 kg)	Jr	Alvin, TX
11	INF	Graham Laxton	R/R	5 ft 11 in (1.8 m)	160 lb (73 kg)	So	Katy, TX
12	INF	Katcher Halligan	L/L	6 ft 0 in (1.83 m)	190 lb (86 kg)	Sr	Sugar Land, TX
13	C	Reuben Bennevendo	L/R	5 ft 9 in (1.75 m)	185 lb (84 kg)	Sr	Houston, TX
14	P	Jack Hamilton	R/R	6 ft 0 in (1.83 m)	190 lb (86 kg)	RS Jr	College Station, TX
15	OF	Jack Walker	L/L	6 ft 2 in (1.88 m)	200 lb (91 kg)	Jr	Shreveport, LA
16	P	Jacob Cyr	L/L	5 ft 11 in (1.8 m)	195 lb (88 kg)	Jr	Hitchcock, TX
17	UTL	Brock Lambert	R/R	6 ft 4 in (1.93 m)	200 lb (91 kg)	Sr	Shreveport, LA
18	P	Ben Smith	R/R	6 ft 6 in (1.98 m)	210 lb (95 kg)	Sr	Cleveland, TN
19	P	Jett Feltman	R/R	6 ft 3 in (1.91 m)	215 lb (98 kg)	Sr	Conroe, TX
20	P	Kameren Hardebeck	R/R	6 ft 4 in (1.93 m)	225 lb (102 kg)	Jr	Texas City, TX
22	P	Louis Castano	R/R	5 ft 10 in (1.78 m)	185 lb (84 kg)	Jr	Miami, FL
24	OF	Rhett Hendricks	R/R	6 ft 1 in (1.85 m)	190 lb (86 kg)	Jr	Springfield, MO
25	P	Remy Marsh	R/R	6 ft 1 in (1.85 m)	215 lb (98 kg)	Jr	Mandeville, LA
26	P	Ben Norton	R/R	5 ft 10 in (1.78 m)	180 lb (82 kg)	Jr	Marietta, GA
27	P	Nick Ferazzi	R/R	6 ft 2 in (1.88 m)	190 lb (86 kg)	Sr	Houston, TX
28	C	Luke Bard	R/R	6 ft 3 in (1.91 m)	190 lb (86 kg)	Jr	Castle Rock, CO
29	C	Levi Castilleja	R/R	5 ft 11 in (1.8 m)	200 lb (91 kg)	Jr	San Antonio, TX
31	C	Anthony Russell	R/R	5 ft 11 in (1.8 m)	190 lb (86 kg)	Fr	Houston, TX
32	P	Tyler McCloskey	R/R	6 ft 2 in (1.88 m)	205 lb (93 kg)	Sr	Cypress, TX
33	P	Joshua Caravalho	R/R	6 ft 7 in (2.01 m)	220 lb (100 kg)	Sr	Santa Clara, CA
35	P	Ryan Porche	R/R	6 ft 4 in (1.93 m)	225 lb (102 kg)	So	River Ridge, LA
36	INF	Canon Chester	R/R	6 ft 3 in (1.91 m)	220 lb (100 kg)	RS So	Sinton, TX
39	P	Aiden DeLeon	R/R	6 ft 0 in (1.83 m)	190 lb (86 kg)	Fr	College Station, TX
41	P	Alejandro Marquez	R/R	6 ft 2 in (1.88 m)	220 lb (100 kg)	Sr	Richmond, TX
43	P	Parker Edwards	R/R	6 ft 5 in (1.96 m)	215 lb (98 kg)	Sr	Houston, TX
44	INF	Harrison Helton	R/R	6 ft 0 in (1.83 m)	195 lb (88 kg)	Jr	The Woodlands, TX
45	P	Luke Campbell	R/R	6 ft 2 in (1.88 m)	190 lb (86 kg)	So	Missouri City, TX
50	P	Collin Toedter	R/R	6 ft 8 in (2.03 m)	225 lb (102 kg)	Fr	Spring, TX
51	P	Seth Davis	L/L	5 ft 8 in (1.73 m)	175 lb (79 kg)	Jr	Pearland, TX
55	C	Adin Morehouse	R/R	5 ft 10 in (1.78 m)	185 lb (84 kg)	Jr	Corsicana, TX

Head coach

Clay VanderLaan – 1st season

Assistant coach(es)

Ryan Lousteau
John Cannon
Ryan Farney
Drew Decker (Graduate Asst.)

Legend

- (C) Team captain
- (S) Suspended
- (I) Ineligible
- Injured
- Current redshirt

Roster
Last update: 2025-02-08

== Schedule and results ==
Legend
	Houston Christian win
	Houston Christian loss
	Postponement/Cancelation/Suspensions
**Bold**	Houston Christian team member
*	Non-Conference game
†	Make-Up Game

2025 Houston Christian Huskies baseball game log (32–25)
Regular season (27–23)

February (5–3)
Date	Opponent	Rank	Site/stadium	Score	Win	Loss	Save	TV	Time	Attendance	Overall record	SLC record
Feb. 14	Central Michigan*		Husky Field • Houston, TX	0–6 (7)	Evan Waters (1-0)	**Edwards, Parker (0-1)**	None		3:00 pm	258	0–1	
Feb. 14	Central Michigan*		Husky Field • Houston, TX	5–0 (7)	**Caravalho, Joshua (1-0)**	Liam Stumpf (0-1)	None		5:30 pm (Note: First night game in Husky Field history)	389	1–1	
Feb. 15	Central Michigan*		Husky Field • Houston, TX	15–3	**Smith, Ben (1-0)**	Hayden Bailey (0-1)	None		6:30 pm	409	2–1	
Feb. 16	Central Michigan*		Husky Field • Houston, TX	9–6	**McCloskey, Tyler (1-0)**	Alejandro Espinoza (0-1)	**Norton, Ben (1)**		12:30 pm	342	3–1	
Feb. 18	vs. Tarleton State*		La Moderna Field • Cleburne, TX						**Postponed–Inclement Weather**			
Feb. 21	at Louisiana-Monroe*		Lou St. Amant Field • Monroe, LA	1–4	Shaw, Zach (2-0)	**Norton, Ben (0-1)**	Gregoire, Josh (1)		6:00 pm	856	3–2	
Feb. 22	at Louisiana–Monroe*		Lou St. Amant Field • Monroe, LA	6–3	**Caravalho, Joshua (2-0)**	Grigg, Landon (0-1)	**Castano, Louis (1)**		2:00 pm	1,296	4–2	
Feb. 23	at Louisiana–Monroe*		Lou St. Amant Field • Monroe, LA						**Cancelled**			
Feb. 25	at UTSA*		Roadrunner Field • San Antonio, TX	1–12^{7}	James Hubbard (1-1)	Feltman, Jett (0-1)	None	ESPN+	6:00 pm	515	4–3	
Feb. 28	at Incarnate Word		Sullivan Field • San Antonio, TX	14–10	**Castano, Louis (1-0)**	Salinas, Josh (2-1)	None	ESPN+	2:05 pm	184	5–3	1–0

March (12–5)
Date	Opponent	Rank	Site/stadium	Score	Win	Loss	Save	TV	Time	Attendance	Overall record	SLC record
Mar 1	at Incarnate Word		Sullivan Field • San Antonio, TX	10–5	**Caravalho, Joshua (3-0)**	Elizondo, Jackson (1-1)	None	ESPN+	2:05 pm	216	6–3	2–0
Mar 2	at Incarnate Word		Sullivan Field • San Antonio, TX	9–7	**Feltman, Jett (1-1)**	Hargett, Hunter (1-1)	**Norton, Ben (1)**	ESPN+	1:05 pm	268	7–3	3–0
Mar 7	McNeese		Husky Field • Houston, TX	6–2	**Castano, Louis (2-0)**	Alexis Gravel (2-1)	None	ESPN+	6:30 pm	317	8–3	4–0
Mar 8	McNeese		Husky Field • Houston, TX	15–8	**Caravalho, Joshua (4-0)**	Cooper Golden (0-1)	**Norton, Ben (2)**		2:00 pm	297	9–3	5–0
Mar 9	McNeeese		Husky Field • Houston, TX	4–6	Lopez, Sergio (3-0)	**Smith, Ben (1-1)**	None	ESPN+	2:00 pm	212	9–4	5–1
Mar 12	Prairie View A&M*		Husky Field • Houston, TX	7–2	**Mentzel, Kyler (1-0)**	Leonardo Bravo (1-1)	None		6:30 pm	232	10–4	
Mar 14	at Rice*		Reckling Park • Houston, TX	4–3^{11}	**Norton, Ben (1-1)**	Jack Ben-Shoshan (0-1)	None	ESPN+	6:30 pm	1,689	11–4	
Mar 15	Rice*		Husky Field • Houston, TX	6–2	**Caravalho, Joshua (5-0)**	J.D. McCracken (0-2)	None		2:00 pm	417	12–4	
Mar 15	Rice*		Husky Field • Houston, TX	4–7	Tucker Alch (2-0)	**Feltman, Jett (1-2)**	Von Baker (1)		5:30 pm	431	12–5	
Mar 16	at Rice*		Reckling Park • Houston, TX	2–6	Reed Gallant (1-1)	**Smith, Ben (1-2)**	None	ESPN+	1:00 pm	1,727	12–6	
Mar 21	at UT Rio Grande Valley		UTRGV Baseball Stadium • Edinburg, TX	6–3	**Edwards, Parker (1-1)**	Lopez, Jack (0-1)	**Norton, Ben (3)**	ESPN+	6:30 pm	3,334	13–6	6–1
Mar 22	at UT Rio Grande Valley		UTRGV Baseball Stadium • Edinburg, TX	0–15^{7}	Loa, Víctor (4-1)	**Caravalho, Joshua (5-1)**	None	ESPN+	6:30 pm	6,324	13–7	6–2
Mar 23	at UT Rio Grande Valley		UTRGV Baseball Stadium • Edinburg, TX	12–9	**Smith, Ben (2-2)**	Limas, Jacob (1-1)	None	ESPN+	Noon	1,371	14–7	7–2
Mar 25	at Texas A&M*		Olsen Field at Blue Bell Park • College Station, TX	2–7	Clayton Freshcorn (2-2)	**Mentzel, Kyler (1-1)**	Caden McCoy (1)	SECN+	6:00 pm	4,624	14–8	
Mar 28	Stephen F. Austin		Husky Field • Houston, TX	6–4	**Castano, Louis (3-0)**	Jack James (1-1)	None	ESPN+	6:30 pm	219	15–8	8–2
Mar 29	Stephen F. Austin		Husky Field • Houston, TX	12–8	**Ferazzi, Nick (1-0)**	Elian Balmaceda (0-4)	None	ESPN+	2:00 pm	244	16–8	9–2
Mar 30	Stephen F. Austin		Husky Field • Houston, TX	6–4	**Cyr, Jacob (1-0)**	Jonathan Valdez (1-2)	**Norton, Ben (4)**		2:00 pm	204	17–8	10–2

April (7–11)
Date	Opponent	Rank	Site/stadium	Score	Win	Loss	Save	TV	Time	Attendance	Overall record	SLC record
Apr 1	at Baylor*		Baylor Ballpark • Waco, TX	2–3	Glatch, Will (3–0)	**Ferazzi, Nick (1–1)**	None	ESPN+	6:30 pm	1,839	17–9	
Apr 2	at Prairie View A&M*		John W. Tankersley Field • Prairie View, TX	15–13	**Smith, Ben (3–2)**	Thompson, Demarques (1–3)	None		2:00 pm	132	18–9	
Apr 4	Nicholls		Ben Meyer Diamond at Ray E. Didier Field • Thibodaux, LA	4–5	Parache, Nuno (2-1)	**Edwards, Parker (1-2)**	Bordelon, Joseph (1)		6:00 pm	750	18–10	10–3
Apr 5	Nicholls		Ben Meyer Diamond at Ray E. Didier Field • Thibodaux, LA	6–4	**Caravalho, Joshua (6-1)**	Sparks, Alec (4-2)	None		6:00 pm	511	19–10	11–3
Apr 6	Nicholls		Ben Meyer Diamond at Ray E. Didier Field • Thibodaux, LA	4–2	**Smith, Ben (3-2)**	Lindsey, Michael (0-4)	**Castano, Louis (2)**		1:00 pm	511	20–10	12–3
Apr 8	at No. 2 Texas*		UFCU Disch–Falk Field • Austin, TX	2–12^{7}	Jason Flores (3-1)	**Hamilton, Jack (0-1)**	None	SECN+	6:30 pm	6,526	20–11	
Apr 11	at Northwestern State		Husky Field • Houston, TX	17–10	**Castano, Louis (4-0)**	Marionneaux, Dylan (3-3)	None		6:30 pm	411	21–11	13–3
Apr 12	at Northwestern State		Husky Field • Houston, TX	5–2	**Caravalho, Joshua (7-1)**	Bryan, Tyler (1-5)	**Norton, Ben (5)**		2:00 pm	174	22–11	14–3
Apr 13	at Northwestern State		Husky Field • Houston, TX	5–10	Hillen, Trent (5-1)	**Smith, Ben (3-3)**	Marien, Wesley (1)		2:00 pm	321	22–12	14–4
Apr 15	at Texas State*		Bobcat Ballpark • San Marcos, TX	3–9	Glaser, Josh (1–0)	**Smith, Ben (3–4)**		ESPN+	6:00 pm	1,338	22–13	
Apr 17	at New Orleans		Maestri Field at Privateer Park • New Orleans, LA	5–10	Edwards, Grant (3–2)	**Castano, Louis (4–1)**		ESPN+	6:30 pm	406	22–14	14–5
Apr 18	at New Orleans		Maestri Field at Privateer Park • New Orleans, LA	7–9	Calloway, Bryce (1–1)	**Mentzel, Kyler (1–2)**		ESPN+	6:30 pm	425	22–15	14–6
Apr 19	at New Orleans		Maestri Field at Privateer Park • New Orleans, LA	5–6	Austin, Ira (4–1)	**Caravalho, Joshua (7–2)**		ESPN+	2:00 pm	488	22–16	14–7
Apr 22	at Baylor*		Baylor Ballpark • Waco, TX	1–9	Stasio, Cole (2–1)	**Cyr, Jacob (1–1)**		ESPN+	6:30 pm	2,051	22–17	
Apr 25	Southeastern Louisiana		Husky Field • Houston, TX	0–1	Stuprich, Brennan (9–2)	**Edwards, Parker (1–3)**	St. Pierre, Brady (8)	ESPN+	6:30 pm	401	22–18	14–8
Apr 26	Southeastern Louisiana		Husky Field • Houston, TX	5–4	**Caravalho, Joshua (8–2)**	Lirette, Luke (4–2)	**Norton, Ben (6)**	ESPN+	2:00 pm	129	23–18	15–8
Apr 27	Southeastern Louisiana		Husky Field • Houston, TX	2–10	Webb, Truitt (1–0)	**Smith, Ben (3–5)**		ESPN+	2:00 pm	253	23–19	15–9
Apr 30	Tarleton State*		Husky Field • Houston, TX	10–4	**Cyr, Jacob (2–1)**	Bosse, Ben (0–1)			6:30 pm	302	24–19	

May (8–6)
Date	Opponent	Rank	Site/stadium	Score	Win	Loss	Save	TV	Time	Attendance	Overall record	SLC record
May 3	Texas A&M–Corpus Christi		Husky Field • Houston, TX	4–3	**Castano, Louis (5–1)**	Watkins, Preston (1–2)		ESPN+	6:30 pm	372	25–19	16–9
May 3	Texas A&M–Corpus Christi		Husky Field • Houston, TX	1–5	Dean, David (2–4)	**Caravalho, Joshua (8–3)**	Molina, Matthew (2)	ESPN+	2:00 pm	372	25–20	16–10
May 4	Texas A&M–Corpus Christi		Husky Field • Houston, TX	2–0	**Smith, Ben (4–5)**	Shea, Bryson (1–5)	**Cyr, Jacob (1)**	ESPN+	2:00 pm	298	26–20	17–10
May 8	at Lamar		Vincent–Beck Stadium • Beaumont, TX	0–10^{8}	Hunsaker, Riely (4–2)	**Edwards, Parker (1–4)**	Havard, Peyton (5)	ESPN+	6:00 pm	1,192	26–21	17–11
May 9	at Lamar		Vincent–Beck Stadium • Beaumont, TX	9–11	Neal, Austin (2-1)	**Norton, Ben (1-2)**	None	ESPN+	6:00 pm	1,387	26–22	17–12
May 10	at Lamar		Vincent–Beck Stadium • Beaumont, TX	5–17	Shertel, Jayden (3-0)	**Smith, Ben (4-6)**	Moseley, Kyle (2)	ESPN+	3:00 pm	1,901	26–23	17–13
May 13	at Sam Houston State*		Don Sanders Stadium • Huntsville, TX	6–3	**Feltman, Jett (2–2)**	Mondey, Connor (0–5)	**Norton, Ben (7)**		6:00 pm	133	27–23	

Postseason ( 5–2 )

Southland Conference Tournament (Edinburg Bracket) ( 3–0 )
Date	Opponent	(Seed)/Rank	Site/stadium	Score	Win	Loss	Save	TV	Time	Attendance	Overall record	Tournament record
May 15	vs. (3) Lamar	(6)	UTRGV Baseball Stadium • Edinburg, TX	6–3	**Edwards, Parker (2-4)**	Hunsaker, Riely (4-3)	**Castano, Louis (3)**	ESPN+	1:00 pm	257	28–23	1–0
May 16	at (2) UT-Rio Grande Valley	(6)	UTRGV Baseball Stadium • Edinburg, TX	9–6	**Caravalho, Joshua (9-3)**	Limas, Jacob (2-3)	**Norton, Ben (8)**	ESPN+	6:00 pm	3,381	29-23	2–0
May 17	at (2) UT-Rio Grande Valley	(6)	UTRGV Baseball Stadium • Edinburg, TX	4–2	**Castano, Louis (6–1)**	Bonilla, Robert (1–4)		ESPN+	6:00 pm	2,497	30–23	3–0

Southland Conference Tournament Championship ( 2–0 )
Date	Opponent	(Seed)/Rank	Site/stadium	Score	Win	Loss	Save	TV	Time	Attendance	Overall record	Tournament record
May 22	(7) New Orleans	(6)	Husky Field • Houston, TX	8–3	**Edwards, Parker (3–4)**	Longshore, Zach (2–6)		ESPN+	6:00 pm	543	31–23	4–0
May 23	(7) New Orleans	(6)	Husky Field • Houston, TX	16–11	**Castano, Louis (7–1)**	Edwards, Grant (3–5)	**Norton, Ben (9)**	ESPN+	6:00 pm	563	32–23	5–0

Austin Regional ( 0–2 )
Date	Opponent	(Seed)/Rank	Site/stadium	Score	Win	Loss	Save	TV	Time	Attendance	Overall record	Regional record
May 30	at (1) Texas	(4)	UFCU Disch–Falk Field • Austin, TX	1–7	Saunier, Grayson (2–0)	**Edwards, Parker (3–5)**	Hamilton, Hudson (2)	ESPN+	1:00 pm	7,673	32–24	0–1
May 31	(3) Kansas State	(4)	UFCU Disch–Falk Field • Austin, TX	4–7	Sheffield, Lincoln (7–4)	**Caravalho, Josh (9–4)**		ESPN+	2:00 pm	6,748	32–25	0–2
