= Catholic High School (Baton Rouge, Louisiana) =

Location
- 855 Hearthstone Drive; Baton Rouge, Louisiana 70806; United States; 30°26′27″N 91°9′23″W

Information
- Former name: St. Vincent's Academy (1894-1928)
- Type: Private, Catholic, All-Boys, college-preparatory educational institution
- Motto: Latin: Ametur Cor Jesu English: Loved be the Heart of Jesus
- Religious affiliations: Roman Catholic, (Brothers of the Sacred Heart)
- Established: 1894; 132 years ago
- Founder: Brothers of the Sacred Heart,
- Sister school: St. Joseph's Academy
- President: Lisa Harvey
- Principal: Tom Eldringoff
- Faculty: 99
- Grades: 8–12
- Enrollment: 1,145 (2025-2026)
- Campus size: 36 acres (150,000 m^{2})
- Campus type: Urban
- Colors: Black and orange
- Fight song: Bruin Fight Song
- Athletics conference: LHSAA District 5-5A
- Mascot: Bruin
- Nickname: Bears
- Team name: CHS Bears
- Accreditation: SACS
- Publication: Bruin Broadcast Network
- Newspaper: Bearly Published
- Yearbook: Bruin
- Alma Mater song: Catholic High School Alma Mater
- Website: www.catholichigh.org

Catholic High School is a private, Catholic college-preparatory day school run by the United States Province of the Brothers of the Sacred Heart in Baton Rouge, Louisiana. It was founded in 1894 as St. Vincent's Academy. It offers grades eight through twelve.

== History ==
Catholic High School was founded in 1894 as St. Vincent's Academy. The school was so named in recognition of the Society of St. Vincent de Paul, who helped organize and establish the school. The original site of the school was an old frame building in downtown Baton Rouge, and the enrollment was 106 students. By the 1920s, the enrollment had grown to approximately 300 students, and in 1928, the Brothers of the Sacred Heart built a new school, gym, and brother's residence at the corner of North Street and Fourth Street, and was renamed to Catholic High School.

In the 1930s and 1940s, the school's enrollment continued to increase, prompting the Brothers to acquire 36 acres (150,000 m^{2}) of land in midtown Baton Rouge to build a campus to accommodate a larger student body, which was donated by R. Frank Cangelosi. After 10 years of delayed construction, Catholic High School, with its student body of 450 students, moved to its present location at 855 Hearthstone Drive in September 1957. The original buildings on the new campus included a residence for brothers and teachers, a small building used as a PE locker room and band room, and the main building. The main building at the time contained several offices, a library, six classrooms, and a few science lab classrooms. In 1963, the gymnasium was built. In 1971, the R. Frank Cangelosi Mall was built between the main building and gym for student use as an auxiliary cafeteria. In 1972, a new student wing, containing six classrooms, a cafeteria called the Union, and a library was added; the original library was converted into a faculty workroom.

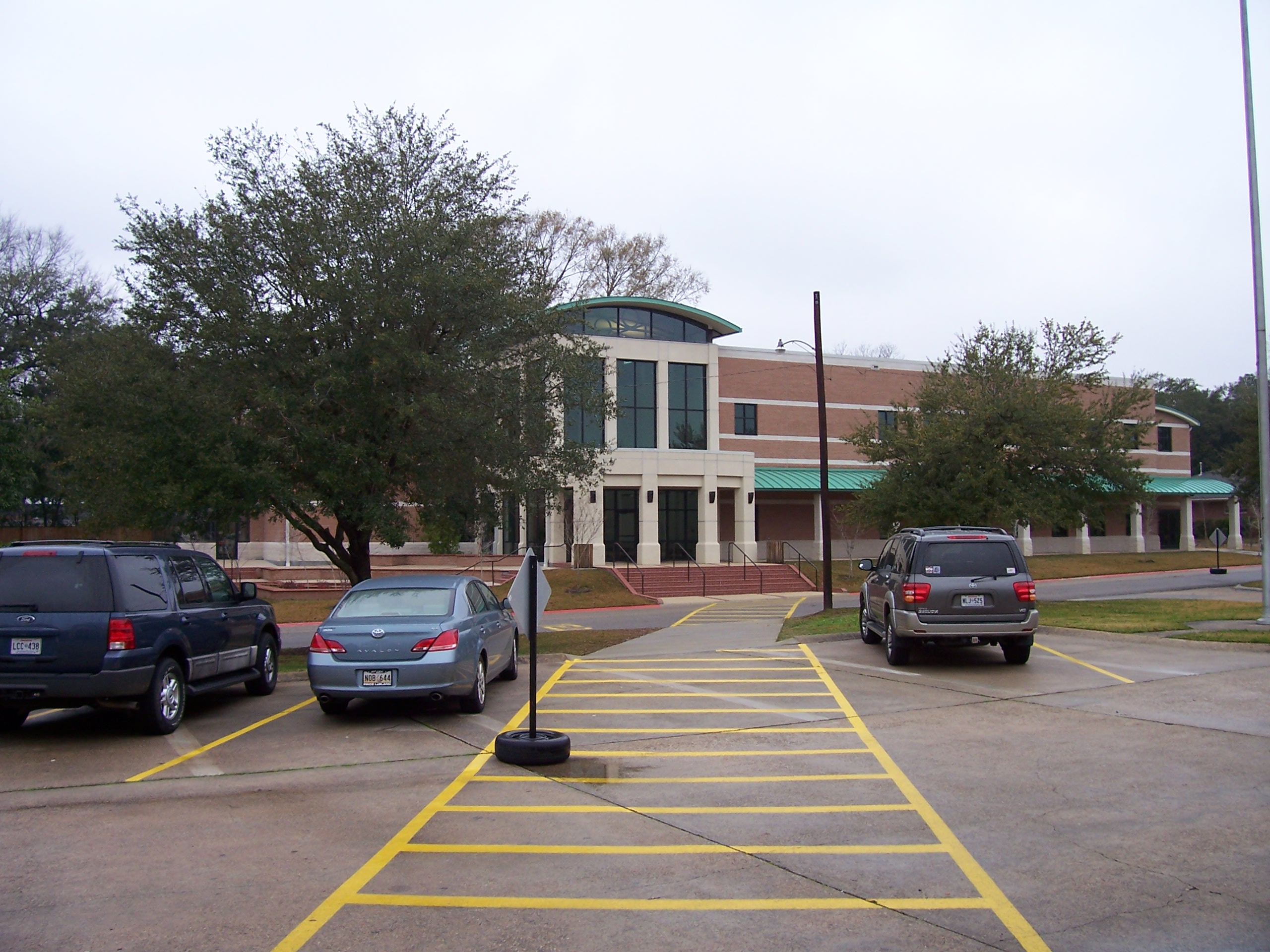
The Brother Gordian Science Center, finished in 2005.

In the early 1980s, a football practice field and baseball field were added, along with an all-weather track (which was renovated and repaved in 2000). In 1985, the Fine Arts-Computer Center, containing a computer lab and classroom, a band room, a chorus room, art room, drafting room, and several classrooms was added. Around this time, the original band room was converted into a weight room. In 1990, a maintenance shed was added, and in 1991, in preparation for the school's 100th anniversary, the Centennial Courtyard was built. Also in the early 1990s, the school purchased three homes across the street from the campus to use as additional offices.

In the fall of 2002, the gymnasium was renovated to install air conditioning, and at that time CHS dedicated a new Health and Physical Education Center with a weight room, a wrestling room, locker rooms for athletes and PE students, and two new classrooms.

In 2005, the Brother Gordian Udinsky Science Center, containing updated science labs for biology, chemistry, and physics, a new computer lab, and several classrooms, was dedicated and opened.

On October 14, 2020, CHS celebrated the opening of the Brother Donnan Berry, S.C., Student Center. The 32,000 sf, two-story facility features a high-end commercial kitchen and dining for 600 downstairs as well as five classrooms, flexible study spaces, a conference room, and an expansive faculty wing on the second floor. Designed by local architects Tipton Associates, APAC, and Ritter Maher, the Student Center won an AIA Baton Rouge Rose Award for design excellence in August 2021.

In January 2021, Catholic High opened its new athletic Strength and Conditioning Center. The goal of the new structure is to provide CHS student-athletes with a second workout location on campus to meet the current demand from the different sports teams.

The school was recognized as a Cognia School of Distinction in 2023.

On November 11, 2026, Dale Weiner, a legend in Catholic High football passed away at 74.

== Academics ==
CHS offers 21 AP courses. The AP Classes are Art History, Biology, Calculus, Comparative Government and Politics, English Language, English Literature, Environmental Science, European History, French, Human Geography, Latin, Macroeconomics, Microeconomics, Music Theory, Physics, Psychology, Spanish, Statistics, U.S. History, U.S. Government and Politics, World History

Catholic High has been recognized as a National Blue Ribbon School by the United States Department of Education 6 times: 1989, 1993, 1998, 2003, 2014, and 2020. Catholic High School holds the record of the most blue ribbons in America.

== Athletics ==
Catholic High athletics competes in the LHSAA. The Bears are currently in District 4-5A with the largest public schools in East Baton Rouge Parish, including Central, Scotlandville, Woodlawn and Zachary.

Catholic High school offers many sports to its students including football, swimming, wrestling, lacrosse, soccer, bowling, power lifting, ultimate frisbee, baseball, basketball, cross country, golf, tennis, and track and field.

=== Championships ===
Catholic High has won a total of 113 State Championships across multiple sports, along with 92 State Runner-up titles and 426 District, Metro, or Regional titles.

Football championships

- (5) State Championships: 2015, 2017, 2020, 2021, 2023

Catholic High won its first football state championship as 2015 Louisiana Division I state champions under Louisiana Sports Hall of Fame Head Coach, Dale Weiner.

Baseball championships

The Bears have won seven state championships. In the 2024 season, the Bears, led by William Schmidt, were named national champions for the first time in school history.

== Notable alumni ==
- Fred S. LeBlanc, Class of 1916, former Louisiana attorney general, mayor of Baton Rouge, and judge
- Carl Weiss, Valedictorian of the Class of 1921, a local doctor and purported assassin of Huey Long
- Paul M. Hebert, Class of 1924, Dean of the LSU Law School (now known as the Paul M. Hebert Law Center)
- Gayle Hatch, Class of 1957, head coach for the 2004 USA Men's Olympic Weightlifting Team
- John Fred, Class of 1959, musician and co-writer of the song "Judy in Disguise"
- Frank J. Polozola, Class of 1959, former United States district court judge (1980-2013)
- John Maginnis, Class of 1966, Louisiana political journalist, author, and commentator^{[2]}
- Warren Capone, Class of 1970, football player for the Dallas Cowboys and the Birmingham Americans
- Jeff Fortenberry, Class of 1978, Nebraska U.S. Representative
- Tim Joiner, Class of 1979, football player for the Houston Oilers and the Denver Broncos
- Neal Dellocono, Class of 1980, football player for the Dallas Cowboys and the Houston Oilers
- Scott Woodward, Class of 1981, athletics director at LSU, Texas A&M and Washington^{[5]}
- Garret Graves, Class of 1990, former Louisiana U.S. Representative (2015-2025)
- David Dellucci, Class of 1991, retired Major League Baseball player for the Baltimore Orioles, Arizona Diamondbacks (a member of the 2001 World Series team), New York Yankees, Texas Rangers, Philadelphia Phillies, Cleveland Indians, and Toronto Blue Jays
- Warrick Dunn, Class of 1993, former running back for the Tampa Bay Buccaneers and Atlanta Falcons
- Kurt Ainsworth, Class of 1996, baseball player for the San Francisco Giants, Baltimore Orioles, and the CEO of Marucci Sports.
- Major Applewhite, Class of 1997, football player at the University of Texas and head coach at the University of Houston and the University of South Alabama
- Travis Minor, Class of 1997, football player for the Miami Dolphins and St. Louis Rams
- Donnie Jones, Class of 1999, football player for the LSU Tigers (1999–2003); Seattle Seahawks (2004); Miami Dolphins (2005 & 2006); St. Louis Rams (2007–2011); Houston Texans (2012) and Philadelphia Eagles (2013-2017). Holder of numerous awards and team records, including being named NFC Special Teams Player of the Week in two successive Eagle games in 2013. Super Bowl LII champion.
- Chris Williams, Class of 2003, football player for the Chicago Bears, St. Louis Rams and Buffalo Bills
- Brandon Harrison, Class of 2003, football player for the Houston Texans
- Jeremy Stewart, Class of 2007, football player for the Oakland Raiders and the Denver Broncos
- Austin Nola, Class of 2008, MLB baseball player San Diego Padres^{[4]}
- Aaron Nola, Class of 2011, MLB All Star baseball player, Philadelphia Phillies^{[3]}
- Ben Braymer, Class of 2013, MLB baseball player
- Cameron Tom, Class of 2013, NFL player for the Miami Dolphins
- Derrius Guice, Class of 2015, NFL running back^{[1]}
- Josh Smith (infielder), Class of 2016, infielder for the Texas Rangers, World Series Champion
- Clyde Edwards-Helaire, Class of 2017, football player for the Kansas City Chiefs
- Zach Bako-Bewele, Class of 2017, NFL Offensive Lineman for the Green Bay Packers
- Emery Jones, Class of 2022, college football offensive tackle for the LSU Tigers (2022-2024) and currently offensive tack for National Football League for the Baltimore Ravens (2025–present)
- William Schmidt, Class of 2024, college baseball pitcher for the LSU Tigers
