= Tommy Calandro =

American weightlifter (born 1968)

Tommy Calandro (born 1958) is a former Olympic weightlifter who represented the United States in the 1984 Summer Olympics. He placed 19th in the men's middle-heavyweight event. Coached by Gayle Hatch, he was the first Olympic weightlifter from Baton Rouge.

In addition to his participation in the Olympics, Calandro received a bronze medal at the 1987 Pan American Games for middle-heavyweight lifting.

== Weightlifting achievements ==
- Olympic Games team member (1984)
- Bronze medalist at the 1987 Pan American Games
