= William Schmidt (pitcher) =

American baseball player (born 2005)

LSU Tigers – No. 9
- Pitcher
- Born: October 4, 2005 (age 20)
- Bats: Right Throws: Right

Career highlights and awards
- College World Series champion (2025)

William August Schmidt (born October 4, 2005) is an American college baseball pitcher for the LSU Tigers.

== Amateur career ==
Schmidt grew up in Baton Rouge, Louisiana and attended Catholic High School. In Schmidt's senior season, he earned a record of 9–0, while having a 0.44 ERA and 102 strikeouts against 17 walks in 63 2/3 innings and led the team to a state championship in 2022 and 2024. His crucial role in the 2024 season yielded a national championship, where he pitched the Bears to victory in the final game. Throughout his high school career, Schmidt was coached by Tyler Naquin, pitching coach for the Catholic High Bears, who significantly contributed to his development. He was projected as a late first-round pick in the 2024 Major League Baseball draft, but would later withdraw from the draft and would enroll at LSU. Coming out of high school, he was the No. 1 ranked right hand pitching draft prospect, No. 1 ranked in Louisiana and No. 5 ranked overall.

In 2025, during his freshman season, Schmidt posted a 7–0 record with a 4.73 ERA over 32.1 innings pitched. As a member of the LSU Tigers, he was part of the team that won the 2025 Men's College World Series.
