= 2025 Lamar Cardinals baseball team =

American college baseball season

2025 Lamar Cardinals baseball
- Conference: Southland Conference
- Record: 40–17 (20–10 SLC)
- Head coach: Will Davis (9th season)
- Assistant coaches: Scott Hatten; Sean McGrath; Tod McDowell
- Home stadium: Vincent–Beck Stadium

2025 Southland Conference baseball standings
	Conf.				Overall
Team	W		L	PCT	W		L	PCT
Southeastern Louisiana ‍†‍‍	22	–	8	.733	38	–	16	.704
UT Rio Grande Valley ‍†‍‍	22	–	8	.733	36	–	18	.667
Lamar ‍‍‍	20	–	10	.667	40	–	17	.702
McNeese ‍‍‍	19	–	11	.633	31	–	17	.646
Northwestern State ‍‍‍	19	–	11	.633	35	–	21	.625
Houston Christian ‍‍‡‍^{y}	17	–	13	.567	32	–	25	.561
New Orleans ‍‍‍	12	–	18	.400	28	–	26	.519
Texas A&M–Corpus Christi ‍‍‍	12	–	18	.400	21	–	31	.404
Nicholls ‍‍‍	10	–	20	.333	17	–	32	.347
Stephen F. Austin ‍‍‍	9	–	21	.300	18	–	31	.367
Incarnate Word ‍‍‍	3	–	27	.100	17	–	33	.340
† – Conference champion ‡ – Tournament champion y – Invited to the NCAA Tournament; As of May 31, 2025; Rankings from D1Baseball

The 2025 Lamar Cardinals baseball team represented Lamar University during the 2025 NCAA Division I baseball season as members of the Southland Conference. The Cardinals played their home games at Vincent–Beck Stadium located on the university campus in Beaumont, Texas. The Cardinals were led by ninth–year head coach Will Davis. The team compiled a 40–17 overall record and finished conference play in third place with a 20–10 record. They qualified for the SLC tournament as the number 3 seed. Their season ended with a 0–2 record in tournament play.

== Preseason ==
=== Southland Conference Coaches Poll ===
The Southland Conference Coaches Poll was released on February 6, 2025. Lamar was picked to finish first in the Southland Conference with 197 overall votes and 18 first place votes.

Coaches poll
Predicted finish	Team	Votes (1st place)
1	Lamar	197 (18)
2	Southeastern Louisiana	146 (4)
3	McNeese	145
4	UT Rio Grande Valley	144
5	Nicholls	129
6	New Orleans	128
7	Incarnate Word	95
8	Northwestern State	89
9	Texas A&M–Corpus Christi	73
10	Houston Christian	37
11	Stephen F. Austin	27

=== Preseason All-Southland team ===
Zak Skinner, Brayden Evans, and Kyle Moseley were named to the conference preseason first team. Matt Ryan was named to the conference preseason second team.

==== First Team ====
- Zak Skinner* (LU, JR, Catcher)
- Brayden Evans* (LU, JR, 1st Base)
- Isaac Webb* (TAMU, SR, 2nd Base)
- TJ Salvaggio (SELU, SR, Shortstop)
- Rocco Gump (NWST, SR, 3rd Base)
- Reese Lipoma* (NWST, RSR, Outfielder)
- Connor Westenburg (McN, SR, Outfielder)
- Cole Stromboe+ (SELU, RSR, Outfielder)
- Tristian Moore+ (UNO, RSR, Outfielder)
- Bryce Calloway* (UNO, SR, Utility)
- Rey Mendoza (UIW, GR, Designated Hitter)
- Brennan Stuprich* (SELU, RSR, Starting Pitcher)
- Josh Salinas (UIW, GR, Starting Pitcher)
- Zach Garcia (TAMU, SR, Starting Pitcher)
- Kyle Moseley (LU, SR, Relief Pitcher)

*-2024 Southland All-Conference Selection
+-Tie for final spot

==== Second Team ====
- Steven Lancia (UTRGV, SR, Catcher)
- Martin Vazquez (UTRGV, SR, 1st Base)
- Diego Villsecas* (UNO, SR, 2nd Base)
- Isaac Lopez (UTRGV, GR, Shortstop)
- Easton Moomau+ (UTRGV, SO, 3rd Base)
- Matt Ryan+ (LU, SR, 3rd Base)
- Balin Valentine (NWST, SR, Outfielder)
- Parker Coley (SELU, SR, Outfielder)
- Jude Hall (SELU, SR, Outfielder)
- Simon Larranaga (MCN, SR, Utility)
- Armani Raygoza (UTRGV, RSO, Designated Hitter)
- Parker Edwards (HCU, SR, Starting Pitcher)
- Angelo Cabral (UTRGV, GR, Starting Pitcher)
- Tyler Bryan (NWST, JR, Starting Pitcher)
- Larson Fabre (SELU, JR, Relief Pitcher)

*-2024 Southland All-Conference Selection
+-Tie for final spot

== Roster ==
2025 Lamar Cardinals baseball team
Players
Coaches

#	Pos.	Name	B/T	Height	Weight	Year	Home town
1	RHP	Trent Baker	R/R	—	—	Jr	Spring, TX
2	OF	Heladio Moreno	L/L	—	—	Sr	Pearland, TX
3	OF	Damian Ruiz	R/R	—	—	So	Livingston, TX
4	C	Easton Culp	R/R	—	—	So	Salado, TX
5	UTL	Bryce Grizzaffi	R/R	—	—	Sr	Morgan City, LA
6	RHP	Ethan Oceguera	R/R	—	—	Jr	Bridge City, TX
7	RHP	Carter Sutton	R/R	—	—	Sr	Vancouver, WA
8	RHP	Mark Lopez	R/R	—	—	Sr	Houston, TX
9	INF	Reese Beheler	L/R	—	—	Jr	Sugar Land, TX
12	INF	Matt Ryan	R/R	—	—	Sr	Bethesda, MD
13	C	Zak Skinner	R/R	—	—	Jr	Melbourne, Australia
14	RHP	Wagner Morrissette	R/R	—	—	Jr	Whitsett, NC
17	RHP	Logan Hamm	L/R	—	—	Sr	Bridge City, TX
18	LHP	Will Kiesel	R/R	—	—	Jr	Wadesville, IN
19	RHP	Riely Hunsaker	R/R	—	—	Jr	Peculiar, MO
20	LHP	Jayden Shertel	L/L	—	—	Sr	Mays Landing, NJ
21	LHP	Kyle Moseley	L/L	—	—	Sr	Houston, TX
22	INF	Hector Rodriguez	S/R	—	—	Jr	Houston, TX
23	RHP	Kole Tauzin	R/R	—	—	Sr	Tomball, TX
23	RHP	Austin Neal	R/R	—	—	Sr	Claremore, OK
26	INF	Brayden Evans	L/L	—	—	Jr	Pearland, TX
27	OF	Tab Tracy	L/L	—	—	Jr	Houston, TX
28	RHP	Julio Ramos	R/R	—	—	Jr	Nogales, AZ
30	RHP	Travis Phelps	R/R	—	—	Sr	Alvin, TX
31	OF	Kameryn Henderson	R/R	—	—	So	Orange, TX
32	RHP	Fabian Ramirez	R/R	—	—	Jr	Houston, TX
33	RHP	Chris Olivier	R/R	—	—	Jr	Mandeville, LA
34	INF	Caleb Castle	R/R	—	—	Jr	Houston, TX
36	C	Hunter Rebando	R/R	—	—	Sr	Lampasas, TX
37	RHP	Thomas Reinholt	R/R	—	—	So	Port Neches, TX
40	RHP	Baylor Baumann	R/R	—	—	Jr	Heath, TX
41	LHP	Coleson Abel	L/L	—	—	Jr	Kerrville, TX
46	RHP	Reagan Weiblinger	R/R	—	—	Jr	Beaumont, TX
49	OF	Aiden Baumann	/	—	—	Jr	New Braunfels, TX
50	OF	Connor Kaiser	L/R	—	—	Sr	College Station, TX
51	LHP	Hayden Stallings	L/L	—	—	RS Fr	Pasadena, TX
52	RHP	Joshua Shimmin	R/R	—	—	Jr	Richmond, TX
53	RHP	Peyton Havard	R/R	—	—	Sr	Bridge City, TX
55	LHP	Luke Krkovski	L/L	—	—	Sr	Woronora, Australia
99	INF	Zane Spinn	L/R	—	—	Sr	Holland, TX

Head coach

Will Davis – 9th season

Assistant coach(es)

Scott Hatten, Sean McGrath, and Tod McDowell

Hitting coach(es)

Scott Hatten – 24th season

Pitching coach(es)

Sean McGrath – 1st season

Legend

- (C) Team captain
- (S) Suspended
- (I) Ineligible
- Injured
- Current redshirt

Roster
Last update: 2025-02-12

== Schedule and results ==
Legend
	Lamar win
	Lamar loss
	Postponement/Cancelation/Suspensions
**Bold**	Lamar team member
*	Non-Conference game
†	Make-Up Game

2025 Lamar Cardinals baseball game log (40–17)
Regular season (40–15)

February (9–2)
Date	Opponent	Rank	Site/stadium	Score	Win	Loss	Save	TV	Attendance	Overall record	SLC Record
Feb. 14	at CSU Bakersfield*		Hardt Field • Bakersfield, CA	17–1	**Havard, Peyton (1-0)**	Jones, Jeremy (0-1)	None	ESPN+	304	1–0	
Feb. 15	at CSU Bakersfield*		Hardt Field • Bakersfield, CA	1–8	Riley, Michael (1-0)	**Moseley, Kyle (0-1)**	None		373	1–1	
Feb. 16	at CSU Bakersfield*		Hardt Field • Bakersfield, CA	13–3^{8}	**Hamm, Logan (1-0)**	Leary, Jack (0-1)	None		309	2–1	
Feb. 18	North Dakota State*		Vincent–Beck Stadium • Beaumont, TX	10–3	**Sutton, Carter (1-0)**	Luke Agnew (0-1)	None	ESPN+	568	3–1	
Feb. 19	North Dakota State*		Vincent–Beck Stadium • Beaumont, TX	13–2^{7}	**Stallings, Hayden (1-0)**	Matt Sargeant (0-1)	None	ESPN+	543	4–1	
Feb. 21	Albany*		Vincent–Beck Stadium • Beaumont, TX	7–4	**Baker, Trent (1-0)**	Ethan Nardac (0-1)	**Shertel, Jayden (1)**	ESPN+	537	5–1	
Feb. 22	Albany*		Vincent–Beck Stadium • Beaumont, TX	21–0^{7}	**Hunsaker, Riely (1-0)**	Mariano, Matthew (0-1)	None	ESPN+	648	6–1	
Feb. 23	Albany*		Vincent–Beck Stadium • Beaumont, TX	5–3	**Olivier, Chris (1-0)**	Pittz, Ryan (0-1)	**Moseley, Kyle (1)**	ESPN+	653	7–1	
Feb. 24	Oakland*		Vincent–Beck Stadium • Beaumont,	15–2^{8}	**Sutton, Carter (2-0)**	C. Barone (0-1)	None	ESPN+	625	8–1	
Feb. 25	at Louisiana Tech*		J. C. Love Field at Pat Patterson Park • Ruston, LA	6–5	**Krkovski, Luke (1-0)**	Nation,Connor (0-1)	**Lopez, Mark (1)**	ESPN+	1,837	9–1	
Feb. 28	at UT Rio Grande Valley		UTRGV Baseball Stadium • Edinburg, TX	3–13^{7}	Cabral, Angelo (1-0))	**Havard, Peyton (1-1)**	None	ESPN+	3,111	9–2	0–1

March (14–5)
Date	Opponent	Rank	Site/stadium	Score	Win	Loss	Save	TV	Attendance	Overall record	SLC Record
Mar 1	at UT Rio Grande Valley		UTRGV Baseball Stadium • Edinburg, TX	0–2	Loa, Victor (2-1)	**Hunsaker, Riely (1-1)**	Thayer, Harrison (1)	ESPN+	3,345	9–3	0–2
Mar 2	at UT Rio Grande Valley		UTRGV Baseball Stadium • Edinburg, TX	2–5	Hernandez, Francisco (1-0)	**Moseley, Kyle (0-1)**	Oliva, Steven (2)	ESPN+	1,519	9–4	0–3
Mar 4	at Rice*		Reckling Park • Houston, TX	11–7	**Stallings, Hayden (2-0)**	Garrett Stratton (1-1)	None		1,541	10–4	
Mar 7	Stephen F. Austin		Vincent–Beck Stadium • Beaumont, TX	0–2	Cody Templeton (2-0)	**Hunsaker, Riely (1-2)**	None	ESPN+	1,338	10–5	0–4
Mar 8	Stephen F. Austin		Vincent–Beck Stadium • Beaumont, TX	9–3	**Havard, Peyton (2-1)**	Dylan Mulcahy (1-1)	None	ESPN+	1,187	11–5	1–4
Mar 9	Stephen F. Austin		Vincent–Beck Stadium • Beaumont, TX	3–2	**Olivier, Chris (2-0)**	Hayden Tronson (0-3)	**Neal, Austin (1)**	ESPN+	773	12–5	2–4
Mar 11	New Mexico State*		Vincent–Beck Stadium • Beaumont, TX	13–5	**Shertel, Jayden (1-0)**	Ferny Barreda (0-1)	None	ESPN+	651	13–5	
Mar 12	New Mexico State*		Vincent–Beck Stadium • Beaumont, TX	5–4^{10}	**Ramirez, Fabian (1-0)**	Jake Carvajal (1-2)	None	ESPN+	338	14–5	
Battle of the Border (Rivalry)
Mar 14	at McNeese		Joe Miller Ballpark • Lake Charles, LA	8–7^{10}	**Neal, Austin (1-0)**	Sergio Lopez (3-1)	None	ESPN+	727	15–5	3–4
Mar 15	at McNeese		Joe Miller Ballpark • Lake Charles, LA	8–9^{10}	Brady Corcoran(1-0)	**Moseley, Kyle(0-3)**	None	ESPN+	1,111	15–6	3–5
Mar 16	at McNeese		Joe Miller Ballpark • Lake Charles, LA	4–9	Paul Coppinger (1-0)	**Olivier, Chris (2-1)**	None	ESPN+	1,032	15–7	3–6
Mar 18	at Tulane*		Greer Field at Turchin Stadium • New Orleans, LA	14–4	**Krkovski, Luke (2-0)**	J. Rodriguez (2-2)	None	ESPN+	1,392	16–7	
Mar 21	Texas A&M–Corpus Christi		Vincent–Beck Stadium • Beaumont, TX	2–0	**Hunsaker, Riely (2-2)**	Garcia, Zach (2-3)	**Havard, Peyton (1)**	ESPN+	1,087	17–7	4–6
Mar 22	Texas A&M–Corpus Christi		Vincent–Beck Stadium • Beaumont, TX	12–6	**Sutton, Carter (3-0)**	Shea, Bryson (1-2)	**Ramirez, Fabian (1)**	ESPN+	850	18–7	5–6
Mar 23	Texas A&M–Corpus Christi		Vincent–Beck Stadium • Beaumont, TX	8–0	**Olivier, Chris (3-1)**	Dean, David (1-1)	**Neal, Austin (2)**	ESPN+	675	19–7	6–6
Mar 25	Rice*		Vincent–Beck Stadium • Beaumont, TX	2–1	**Moseley, Kyle (1-3)**	Blank (0-3)	**Havard, Peyton (2)**	ESPN+	787	20–7	
Mar 28	at Incarnate Word		Sullivan Field • San Antonio, TX	8–5^{10}	**Ramirez, Fabian (2-0)**	Schlotzhauer, Ryan (1-1)	None	ESPN+	142	21–7	7–6
Mar 29	at Incarnate Word		Sullivan Field • San Antonio, TX	8–4	**Sutton, Carter (4-0)**	McKay, Gus (1-3)	**Krkovski, Luke (1)**		378	22–7	8–6
Mar 30	at Incarnate Word		Sullivan Field • San Antonio, TX	17–6^{7}	**Oliver, Chris (4-1)**	Bush, Jordan (0-1)	None	ESPN+	202	23–7	9–6

April (13–5)
Date	Opponent	Rank	Site/stadium	Score	Win	Loss	Save	TV	Attendance	Overall record	SLC Record
Apr 1	at Tarleton State*		Cecil Ballow Baseball Complex • Stephenville, TX	22–16	**Havard, Peyton (3-1)**	Fiene, Peyton (0-1)	None		197	24–7	
Apr 4	UT Arlington*		Vincent–Beck Stadium • Beaumont, TX	3–2	**Krkovski, Luke (3-0)**	Caden Noah (0-2)	None	ESPN+	695	25–7	
Apr 6	UT Arlington*		Vincent–Beck Stadium • Beaumont, TX	6–5	**Havard, Peyton (4-1)**	Rhys Stevens (1-4)	None	ESPN+	345	26–7	
Apr 6	UT Arlington*		Vincent–Beck Stadium • Beaumont, TX	2–4	Joe Steeber (3-2)	**Ramirez, Fabian (2-1)**	Caden Noah (2)	ESPN+	335	26–8	
Apr 9	Arkansas–Pine Bluff*		Vincent–Beck Stadium • Beaumont, TX	3–1	**Baker, Trent (2-0)**	Steffan Fak (1-2)	Havard, Peyton (3)		250	27–8	
Apr 11	Nicholls		Vincent–Beck Stadium • Beaumont, TX	5–4^{10}	**Havard, Peyton (5-1)**	Brennan, Woody (0-1)	None		1,209	28–8	10–6
Apr 12	Nicholls		Vincent–Beck Stadium • Beaumont, TX	9–8	**Stallings, Hayden (3-0)**	Poirrier, Cole (0-2)	None		1,073	29–8	11–6
Apr 13	Nicholls		Vincent–Beck Stadium • Beaumont, TX	16–5^{7}	**Sutton, Carter (5-0)**	Hill, Dalton (2-4)	None		758	30–8	12–6
Apr 15	at Sam Houston*		Don Sanders Stadium • Huntsville, TX	18–9	**Shimmin, Joshua (1-0)**	Scheetz, Micky (0-1)	None		212	31–8	
Apr 17	at Northwestern State		H. Alvin Brown–C. C. Stroud Field • Natchitoches, LA	8–2	**Olivier, Chris (5-1)**	Marionneaux, Dylan (3-4)	**Havard, Peyton (4)**	ESPN+	764	32–8	13–6
Apr 18	at Northwestern State		H. Alvin Brown–C. C. Stroud Field • Natchitoches, LA	1–2^{10}	Anderson, Austin (2-0)	**Neal, Austin (1-1)**	None	ESPN+	804	32–9	13–7
Apr 19	at Northwestern State		H. Alvin Brown–C. C. Stroud Field • Natchitoches, LA	3–7	Hillen, Trent (6-1)	**Sutton, Carter (5-1)**	Marien, Wesley (2)	ESPN+	634	32–10	13–8
Apr 22	at Houston*		Schroeder Park • Houston, TX	6–11	Perez, Andres (1-1)	**Stallings, Hayden (3-1)**	None		1,244	32–11	
Apr 23	Prairie View A&M*		Vincent–Beck Stadium • Beaumont, TX	14–3^{7}	**Shertel, Jayden (2-0)**	Polledo, Jeffrey (0-1)	None		869	33–11	
Apr 25	New Orleans		Vincent–Beck Stadium • Beaumont, TX	4–3^{10}	**Havard, Peyton (6-1)**	Austin, Ira (4-2)	None	ESPN+		34–11	14–8
Apr 26	New Orleans		Vincent–Beck Stadium • Beaumont, TX	3–2	**Olivier, Chris (6-1)**	Longshore, Zach (1-4)	**Krkovski, Luke (2)**	ESPN+	705	35–11	15–8
Apr 27	New Orleans		Vincent–Beck Stadium • Beaumont, TX	13–3^{8}	**Havard, Peyton (7-1)**	Torrez, Aiden (2-2)	None	ESPN+		36–11	16–8
Apr 29	at Texas A&M*		Olsen Field at Blue Bell Park • College Station, TX	6–13	Rudis, Brad (1-1)	**Sutton, Carter (5-2)**	McCoy, Caden (2)	ESPNU	5,351	36–12	

May (4–3)
Date	Opponent	Rank	Site/stadium	Score	Win	Loss	Save	TV	Attendance	Overall record	SLC Record
May 2	at Southeastern Louisiana		Pat Kenelly Diamond at Alumni Field • Hammond, LA	5–0	**Hunsaker, Riely (3-2)**	Stuprich, Brennan (9-3)	None	ESPN+	1,195	37–12	17–8
May 3	at Southeastern Louisiana		Pat Kenelly Diamond at Alumni Field • Hammond, LA	0–4	Polk, Lakin (4-0)	**Olivier, Chris (6-2)**	None	ESPN+	1,210	37–13	17–9
May 4	at Southeastern Louisiana		Pat Kenelly Diamond at Alumni Field • Hammond, LA	4–7	Lobell, Blake (6-1)	**Havard, Peyton (7-2)**	St. Pierre, Brady (9)	ESPN+	1,202	37–14	17–10
May 6	at No. 1 Texas*		UFCU Disch–Falk Field • Austin, TX	3–9	Walker, Ethan (1-0)	**Sutton, Carter (5-3)**	Hamilton, Hudson (1)	SECN+	6,921	37–15	
May 8	Houston Christian		Vincent–Beck Stadium • Beaumont, TX	10–0^{8}	**Hunsaker, Riely (4-2)**	Edwards, Parker (1-4)	**Havard, Peyton (5)**	ESPN+	1,192	38–15	18–10
May 9	Houston Christian		Vincent–Beck Stadium • Beaumont, TX	11–9	**Neal, Austin (2-1)**	Norton, Ben (1-2)	None	ESPN+	1,387	39–15	19–10
May 10	Houston Christian		Vincent–Beck Stadium • Beaumont, TX	17–5^{7}	**Shertel, Jayden (3-0)**	Smith, Ben (4-6)	**Moseley, Kyle (2)**	ESPN+	1,901	40–15	20–10

Postseason ( 0–2 )

Southland Conference Tournament (Edinburg Bracket) ( 0–2 )
Date	Opponent	(Seed)/Rank	Site/stadium	Score	Win	Loss	Save	TV	Attendance	Overall record	Tournament record
May 15	vs. (6) Houston Christian	(3)	UTRGV Baseball Stadium • Edinburg, TX	3–6	Edwards, Parker (2-4)	**Hunsaker, Riely (4-3)**	Castano, Louis (3)	ESPN+	257	40–16	0–1
May 16	vs. (7) Texas A&M–Corpus Christi	(3)	UTRGV Baseball Stadium • Edinburg, TX	5–12	Garcia, Z (7-4)	**Olivier, Chris (6-3)**	Soliz, C (4)	ESPN+	185	40–17	0–2

Legend: = Win = Loss = Cancelled
Bold = Lamar team member
Rankings are based on the team's current ranking in the D1Baseball poll.

Sources: |}

== See also ==
2025 Lamar Lady Cardinals softball team
