= 2025 Southeastern Louisiana Lions baseball team =

NCAA Division I baseball season

2025 Southeastern Louisiana Lions baseball
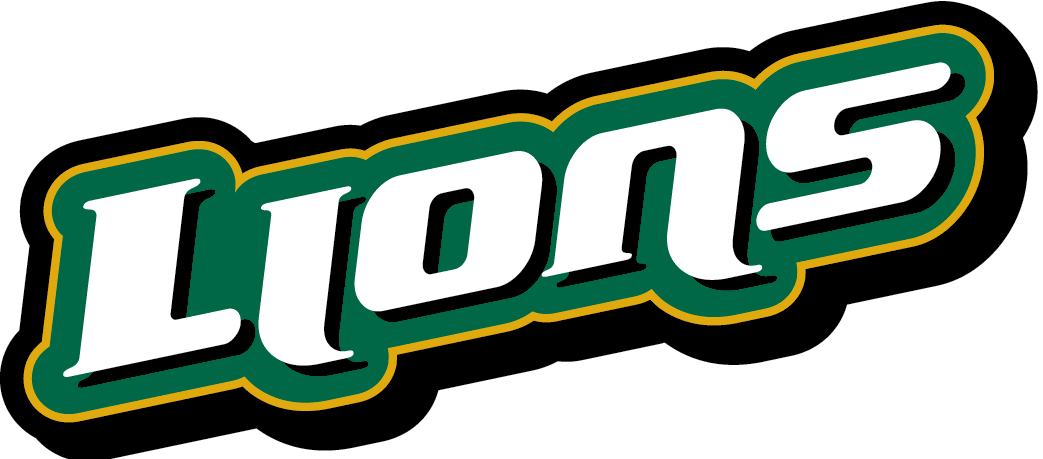

Southland Conference regular season co-champions
- Conference: Southland Conference
- Record: 38–16 (22–8 Southland)
- Head coach: Bobby Barbier (2nd season)
- Assistant coaches: Taylor Dugas; Evan Bush; Spencer Goodwin
- Home stadium: Pat Kenelly Diamond at Alumni Field

2025 Southland Conference baseball standings
	Conf.				Overall
Team	W		L	PCT	W		L	PCT
Southeastern Louisiana ‍†‍‍	22	–	8	.733	38	–	16	.704
UT Rio Grande Valley ‍†‍‍	22	–	8	.733	36	–	18	.667
Lamar ‍‍‍	20	–	10	.667	40	–	17	.702
McNeese ‍‍‍	19	–	11	.633	31	–	17	.646
Northwestern State ‍‍‍	19	–	11	.633	35	–	21	.625
Houston Christian ‍‍‡‍^{y}	17	–	13	.567	32	–	25	.561
New Orleans ‍‍‍	12	–	18	.400	28	–	26	.519
Texas A&M–Corpus Christi ‍‍‍	12	–	18	.400	21	–	31	.404
Nicholls ‍‍‍	10	–	20	.333	17	–	32	.347
Stephen F. Austin ‍‍‍	9	–	21	.300	18	–	31	.367
Incarnate Word ‍‍‍	3	–	27	.100	17	–	33	.340
† – Conference champion ‡ – Tournament champion y – Invited to the NCAA Tournament; As of May 31, 2025; Rankings from D1Baseball

The 2025 Southeastern Louisiana Lions baseball team represented Southeastern Louisiana University during the 2025 NCAA Division I baseball season. The Lions played their home games at Pat Kenelly Diamond at Alumni Field were led by second–year head coach Bobby Barbier. They are members of the Southland Conference.

== Preseason ==
=== Southland Conference Coaches Poll ===
The Southland Conference Coaches Poll was released on February 6, 2025. Southeastern Louisiana was picked to finish second in the Southland Conference with 146 overall votes and 4 first place votes.

Coaches poll
Predicted finish	Team	Votes (1st place)
1	Lamar	197 (18)
2	Southeastern Louisiana	146 (4)
3	McNeese	145
4	UT Rio Grande Valley	144
5	Nicholls	129
6	New Orleans	128
7	Incarnate Word	95
8	Northwestern State	89
9	Texas A&M–Corpus Christi	73
10	Houston Christian	37
11	Stephen F. Austin	27

=== Preseason All-Southland team ===
TJ Salvaggio, Cole Stromboe, and Brennan Stuprich were named to the conference preseason first team. Parker Coley, Jude Hall, and Larsen Fabre were named to the conference preseason second team.

==== First Team ====
- Zak Skinner* (LU, JR, Catcher)
- Brayden Evans* (LU, JR, 1st Base)
- Isaac Webb* (TAMU, SR, 2nd Base)
- TJ Salvaggio (SELU, SR, Shortstop)
- Rocco Gump (NWST, SR, 3rd Base)
- Reese Lipoma* (NWST, RSR, Outfielder)
- Connor Westenburg (McN, SR, Outfielder)
- Cole Stromboe+ (SELU, RSR, Outfielder)
- Tristian Moore+ (UNO, RSR, Outfielder)
- Bryce Calloway* (UNO, SR, Utility)
- Rey Mendoza (UIW, GR, Designated Hitter)
- Brennan Stuprich* (SELU, RSR, Starting Pitcher)
- Josh Salinas (UIW, GR, Starting Pitcher)
- Zach Garcia (TAMU, SR, Starting Pitcher)
- Kyle Moseley (LU, SR, Relief Pitcher)

*-2024 Southland All-Conference Selection
+-Tie for final spot

==== Second Team ====
- Steven Lancia (UTRGV, SR, Catcher)
- Martin Vazquez (UTRGV, SR, 1st Base)
- Diego Villsecas* (UNO, SR, 2nd Base)
- Isaac Lopez (UTRGV, GR, Shortstop)
- Easton Moomau+ (UTRGV, SO, 3rd Base)
- Matt Ryan+ (LU, SR, 3rd Base)
- Balin Valentine (NWST, SR, Outfielder)
- Parker Coley (SELU, SR, Outfielder)
- Jude Hall (SELU, SR, Outfielder)
- Simon Larranaga (MCN, SR, Utility)
- Armani Raygoza (UTRGV, RSO, Designated Hitter)
- Parker Edwards (HCU, SR, Starting Pitcher)
- Angelo Cabral (UTRGV, GR, Starting Pitcher)
- Tyler Bryan (NWST, JR, Starting Pitcher)
- Larson Fabre (SELU, JR, Relief Pitcher)

*-2024 Southland All-Conference Selection
+-Tie for final spot

== Personnel ==
2025 Southeastern Louisiana Lions baseball team
Players
Coaches

#	Pos.	Name	B/T	Height	Weight	Year	Home town
1	OF	Parker Coley	R/R	6 ft 1 in (1.85 m)	194 lb (88 kg)	Sr	Sterlington, Louisiana
2	UTL	Mo Little	R/R	5 ft 10 in (1.78 m)	185 lb (84 kg)	Jr	Brandon, Mississippi
3	OF	Dane Watts	L/L	5 ft 8 in (1.73 m)	158 lb (72 kg)	Jr	Hammond, Louisiana
4	OF	Jude Hall	L/R	5 ft 11 in (1.8 m)	193 lb (88 kg)	Sr	Chilliwack, British Columbia, Canada
5	INF	Giovanni Licciardi (redshirt)	R/R	6 ft 0 in (1.83 m)	190 lb (86 kg)	Jr	Metairie, Louisiana
6	UTL	Ben Robichaux	L/R	5 ft 7 in (1.7 m)	170 lb (77 kg)	Jr	Plaquemine, Louisiana
8	UTL	Brady McGee	R/R	5 ft 10 in (1.78 m)	180 lb (82 kg)	Jr	Lawrence, Mississippi
9	LHP	Chance Vaught (redshirt)	L/L	6 ft 1 in (1.85 m)	182 lb (83 kg)	Sr	Daphne, Alabama
10	RHP	Blake Lobell	R/R	6 ft 2 in (1.88 m)	195 lb (88 kg)	Jr	Holden, Louisiana
11	LHP	Luke Barbier (redshirt)	L/L	5 ft 10 in (1.78 m)	175 lb (79 kg)	Sr	Morgan City, Louisiana
12	RHP	Brady St. Pierre	R/R	6 ft 0 in (1.83 m)	195 lb (88 kg)	Fr	LaPlace, Louisiana
13	RHP	Truitt Webb	R/R	6 ft 0 in (1.83 m)	180 lb (82 kg)	Fr	Paris, Tennessee
14	INF	Braxton Wakefield	R/R	6 ft 0 in (1.83 m)	185 lb (84 kg)	Fr	Houston, Texas
15	INF	TJ Salvaggio	R/R	6 ft 2 in (1.88 m)	190 lb (86 kg)	Sr	Slidell, Louisiana
16	RHP	Luke Lirette	R/R	6 ft 0 in (1.83 m)	180 lb (82 kg)	Jr	Houma, Louisiana
17	RHP	Aiden Vosburg	R/R	6 ft 2 in (1.88 m)	193 lb (88 kg)	Sr	Jarreau, Louisiana
18	RHP	Brennan Stuprich (redshirt)	R/R	5 ft 10 in (1.78 m)	210 lb (95 kg)	Sr	Kenner, Louisiana
19	RHP	Chase Ambrose	R/R	6 ft 0 in (1.83 m)	204 lb (93 kg)	So	Huntsville, Alabama
20	RHP	Levi Shaffer	R/R	5 ft 11 in (1.8 m)	190 lb (86 kg)	Fr	Keller, Texas
21	RHP	Jimmie Johnson (redshirt)	R/R	6 ft 1 in (1.85 m)	168 lb (76 kg)	So	Zachary, Louisiana
22	OF	Cole Stromboe (redshirt)	L/L	5 ft 10 in (1.78 m)	176 lb (80 kg)	Sr	River Ridge, Louisiana
23	UTL	Peyton Woods	L/R	6 ft 1 in (1.85 m)	196 lb (89 kg)	So	Albany, Louisiana
24	UTL	Lakin Polk	L/R	6 ft 4 in (1.93 m)	225 lb (102 kg)	Jr	Ponchatoula, Louisiana
25	RHP	Dakota Lee (redshirt)	R/R	6 ft 3 in (1.91 m)	172 lb (78 kg)	Sr	Purvis, Mississippi
26	OF	Logan Walters (redshirt)	R/R	6 ft 4 in (1.93 m)	210 lb (95 kg)	Sr	Petal, Mississippi
27	RHP	Triston Todorowski (redshirt)	R/R	6 ft 0 in (1.83 m)	189 lb (86 kg)	Sr	Toledo, Ohio
28	RHP	Quinn Smith	R/R	6 ft 4 in (1.93 m)	200 lb (91 kg)	Fr	Paulina, Louisiana
29	RHP	Tony Torres	R/R	6 ft 2 in (1.88 m)	210 lb (95 kg)	Jr	El Paso, Texas
30	RHP	Patrick Vienne (redshirt)	R/R	6 ft 2 in (1.88 m)	225 lb (102 kg)	Jr	Natchez, Louisiana
31	UTL	Gray Rowlett	R/R	6 ft 5 in (1.96 m)	210 lb (95 kg)	Sr	Keller, Texas
32	INF	Tre Brown	R/R	5 ft 10 in (1.78 m)	195 lb (88 kg)	Fr	New Orleans, Louisiana
34	C	Conner O'Neal	L/R	6 ft 3 in (1.91 m)	216 lb (98 kg)	Sr	Waverly Hall, Georgia
35	UTL	Ryan Brome	L/R	6 ft 1 in (1.85 m)	206 lb (93 kg)	Sr	Katy, Texas
36	LHP	Nik Toups	L/L	6 ft 5 in (1.96 m)	245 lb (111 kg)	Fr	Lake Charles, Louisiana
38	LHP	Larson Fabre (redshirt)	R/L	6 ft 0 in (1.83 m)	187 lb (85 kg)	So	Denham Springs, Louisiana
39	C	Michael Curry (redshirt)	R/R	5 ft 11 in (1.8 m)	187 lb (85 kg)	Jr	Brusly, Louisiana
40	UTL	Dom Letort (redshirt)	L/L	6 ft 1 in (1.85 m)	201 lb (91 kg)	Fr	Mandeville, Louisiana
41	RHP	Nick Gisclair	R/R	6 ft 2 in (1.88 m)	215 lb (98 kg)	Jr	Prairieville, Louisiana
42	RHP	Kaleb Howell	R/R	6 ft 6 in (1.98 m)	213 lb (97 kg)	So	Denham Springs, Louisiana
43	LHP	Brant Melancon	L/L	5 ft 9 in (1.75 m)	170 lb (77 kg)	Fr	Baton Rouge, Louisiana
44	C	Bailyn Sorensen	R/R	6 ft 2 in (1.88 m)	220 lb (100 kg)	Sr	Rayville, Louisiana
45	RHP	Jacob Thorn	R/R	6 ft 3 in (1.91 m)	215 lb (98 kg)	Fr	Gulf Breeze, Florida
	RHP	Carson Robb (redshirt)	R/R	6 ft 2 in (1.88 m)	205 lb (93 kg)	So	Vancleave, Mississippi
	LHP	Harris Waghalter (redshirt)	L/L	6 ft 1 in (1.85 m)	155 lb (70 kg)	Fr	Baton Rouge, Louisiana

Head coach

Bobby Barbier (Northwestern State)

Assistant coach(es)

Taylor Dugas (Alabama)
Evan Bush (Alabama)
Spencer Goodwin (Northwestern State)

Legend

- (C) Team captain
- (S) Suspended
- (I) Ineligible
- Injured
- Current redshirt

Roster
Last update: 27 February 2025

== Schedule and results ==
Legend
	Southeastern Louisiana win
	Southeastern Louisiana loss
	Postponement/Cancelation/Suspensions
**Bold**	Southeastern Louisiana team member
*	Non-Conference game
†	Make-Up Game

2025 Southeastern Louisiana Lions baseball game log (38–16)
Regular season (37–14)

February (8–2)
Date	Opponent	Rank	Site/stadium	Score	Win	Loss	Save	TV	Attendance	Overall record	SLC Record
Feb. 14	Lindenwood*		Pat Kenelly Diamond at Alumni Field • Hammond, LA	6–0	**Stuprich, Brennan (1–0)**	NEWELL, Josh (0–1)	None	ESPN+	1,474	1–0	
Feb. 15	Lindenwood*		Pat Kenelly Diamond at Alumni Field • Hammond, LA	18–7^{7}	**Polk, Lakin (1–0)**	BUSCHSCHULTE, Zach (0–1)	None	ESPN+	1,362	2–0	
Feb. 15	Lindenwood*		Pat Kenelly Diamond at Alumni Field • Hammond, LA	13–3^{7}	**Barbier, Luke (1–0)**	BROWN, Eli (0–1)	None	ESPN+	1,491	3–0	
Feb. 16	Lindenwood*		Pat Kenelly Diamond at Alumni Field • Hammond, LA	6–5	**Gisclair, Nick (1–0)**	PASCHKE, Tanner (0–1)	None	ESPN+	1,428	4–0	
Feb. 19	Tulane*		Pat Kenelly Diamond at Alumni Field • Hammond, LA	3–5	Carter Benbrook (1–0)	**Lirette, Luke (0–1)**	Michael Lombardi (1)	ESPN+	1,213	4–1	
Feb. 21	Alcorn State*		Pat Kenelly Diamond at Alumni Field • Hammond, LA	10–0^{7}	**Stuprich, Brennan (2–0)**	Bell (0–1)	None	ESPN+	1,488	5–1	
Feb. 22	Alcorn State*		Pat Kenelly Diamond at Alumni Field • Hammond, LA	11–0^{7}	**Polk, Lakin (2–0)**	Ford, Jermel (0–2)	None	ESPN+	1,187	6–1	
Feb. 22	Alcorn State*		Pat Kenelly Diamond at Alumni Field • Hammond, LA	17–2^{7}	**Lobell, Blake (1–0)**	Dews, Myles (0–1)	None	ESPN+	1,385	7–1	
Feb. 26	at Louisiana*		M. L. Tigue Moore Field at Russo Park • Lafayette, LA	7–9	Tate Hess (1-1)	**Barbier, Luke (1-1)**	None		3,949	7–2	
Feb. 28	Northwestern State		Pat Kenelly Diamond at Alumni Field • Hammond, LA	6–2	**Stuprich, Brennan (3–0)**	White, Carter (1-1)	None	ESPN+	1,264	8–2	1–0

March (14–4)
Date	Opponent	Rank	Site/stadium	Score	Win	Loss	Save	TV	Attendance	Overall record	SLC Record
Mar 1	Northwestern State		Pat Kenelly Diamond at Alumni Field • Hammond, LA	7–3	**Ambrose, Chase (1–0)**	Leonard, Bryce (0–1)	**Gisclair, Nick (1)**	ESPN+	1,264	9–2	2–0
Mar 2	Northwestern State		Pat Kenelly Diamond at Alumni Field • Hammond, LA	6–5	**St. Pierre, Brady (1–0)**	Bivins, Conner (0–1)	None	ESPN+	1,349	10–2	3–0
Mar 4	at Ole Miss*		Swayze Field • Oxford, MS	Game canceled							
Mar 7	at Memphis*		FedExPark • Memphis, TN	7–4	**Stuprich, Brennan (4–0)**	Garner, Seth (1-1)	**St. Pierre, Brady (1)**	ESPN+	686	11–2	
Mar 8	at Memphis*		FedExPark • Memphis, TN	4–5	K. Stepker (1–0)	**Gisclair, Nick (1-1)**	None	ESPN+	712	11–3	
Mar 9	at Memphis*		FedExPark • Memphis, TN	8–3	**Vosburg, Aiden (1–0)**	Robinson, Caden (1–2)	None	ESPN+	769	12–3	
Mar 12	Xavier*		Pat Kenelly Diamond at Alumni Field • Hammond, LA	7–4	**Howell, Kaleb (1–0)**	SCHMIDT, Logan (0–2)	**St. Pierre, Brady (2)**	ESPN+	1,049	13–3	
Mar 14	at Stephen F. Austin		Jaycees Field • Nacogdoches, TX	4–3	**Stuprich, Brennan (5–0)**	C. Templeton (2–1)	**St. Pierre, Brady (3)**	ESPN+		14–3	4–0
Mar 15	at Stephen F. Austin		Jaycees Field • Nacogdoches, TX	16–3	**Polk, Lakin (3–0)**	E. Balmaceda (0–3)	None	ESPN+	160	15–3	5–0
Mar 16	at Stephen F. Austin		Jaycees Field • Nacogdoches, TX	10–0^{8}	**Lobell, Blake (2–0)**	H. Tronson (0–4)	None	ESPN+	160	16–3	6–0
Mar 19	Louisiana*		Pat Kenelly Diamond at Alumni Field • Hammond, LA	7–1	**Lirette, Luke (1-1)**	Aidan Grab (0–1)	None	ESPN+	1,622	17–3	
Mar 21	McNeese		Pat Kenelly Diamond at Alumni Field • Hammond, LA	6–0	**Stuprich, Brennan (6–0)**	Cooper Golden (1–2)	**St. Pierre, Brady (4)**	ESPN+	1,181	18–3	7–0
Mar 22	McNeese		Pat Kenelly Diamond at Alumni Field • Hammond, LA	9–10	Sergio Lopez (4–1)	**Vosburg, Aiden (1-1)**	Paul Coppinger (1)	ESPN+	2,117	18–4	7–1
Mar 23	McNeese		Pat Kenelly Diamond at Alumni Field • Hammond, LA	1–7	Parker Morgan (1–0)	**Lobell, Blake (2–1)**	Diego Corrales (1)	ESPN+	1,036	18–5	7–2
Mar 25	LSU–Alexandria*		Pat Kenelly Diamond at Alumni Field • Hammond, LA	15–6	**Howell, Kaleb (2–0)**	Womack, Corbyn (0–1)	None	ESPN+	1,123	19–5	
Mar 26	Mississippi Valley State*		Pat Kenelly Diamond at Alumni Field • Hammond, LA	13–0^{7}	**Toups, Nik (1–0)**	Meyer, Aiden (0–1)	None	ESPN+	1,013	20–5	
Ponchartrain Bowl
Mar 28	at New Orleans		Maestri Field at Privateer Park • New Orleans, LA	1–4	Edwards, Grant (1–2)	**Stuprich, Brennan (6–1)**	Calloway, Bryce (7)	ESPN+	478	20–6	7–3
Mar 29	at New Orleans		Maestri Field at Privateer Park • New Orleans, LA	8–3	**Vosburg, Aiden (2–1)**	Jones, Skylar (3–1)	None	ESPN+	512	21–6	8–3
Mar 30	at New Orleans		Maestri Field at Privateer Park • New Orleans, LA	17–5^{8}	**Lobell, Blake (3–1)**	Syversen, Cole (3–1)	None	ESPN+	518	22–6	9–3

April (11–6)
Date	Opponent	Rank	Site/stadium	Score	Win	Loss	Save	TV	Attendance	Overall record	SLC Record
Apr 1	at South Alabama*		Eddie Stanky Field • Mobile, AL	8–6	**Ambrose, Chase (2–0)**	Smith, Tyler (2-2)	**St. Pierre, Brady (5)**	ESPN+	1,106	23–6	
Apr 4	Incarnate Word		Pat Kenelly Diamond at Alumni Field • Hammond, LA	2–4	McKay, Gus (2–3)	**Stuprich, Brennan (6–2)**	Posey, Jonah (1)	ESPN+	1,379	23–7	9–4
Apr 5	Incarnate Word		Pat Kenelly Diamond at Alumni Field • Hammond, LA	6–4	**Lirette, Luke (2–1)**	Salinas, Josh (2–4)	**St. Pierre, Brady (6)**	ESPN+	1,027	24–7	10–4
Apr 6	Incarnate Word		Pat Kenelly Diamond at Alumni Field • Hammond, LA	5–1	**Lobell, Blake (4–1)**	Elizondo, Jackson (3–4)	None	ESPN+	1,199	25–7	11–4
Apr 8	at Tulane*		Greer Field at Turchin Stadium • New Orleans, LA	7–3	**Gisclair, Nick (2–1)**	Wes Burton (0–2)	None	ESPN+	1,641	26–7	
Apr 11	at Texas A&M–Corpus Christi		Chapman Field • Corpus Christi, TX	11–3	**Stuprich, Brennan (6–2)**	Garcia, Zach (3–4)	None	ESPN+	341	27–7	12–4
Apr 12	at Texas A&M–Corpus Christi		Chapman Field • Corpus Christi, TX	9–2	**Lirette, Luke (3–1)**	Dean, David (1–3)	None	ESPN+	335	28–7	13–4
Apr 13	at Texas A&M–Corpus Christi		Chapman Field • Corpus Christi, TX	14–5	**Lobell, Blake (5–1)**	Shea, Bryson (1–3)	None	ESPN+	306	29–7	14–4
Apr 15	No. 23 Southern Miss*		Pat Kenelly Diamond at Alumni Field • Hammond, LA	5–14	Sunstrom, Camden (1–0)	**St. Pierre, Brady (1-1)**	Allen, Colby (7)	ESPN+	1,682	29–8	
Apr 17	UT Rio Grande Valley		Pat Kenelly Diamond at Alumni Field • Hammond, LA	5–2	**Stuprich, Brennan (8–2)**	Oliva, Steven (0–2)	**St. Pierre, Brady (7)**	ESPN+	1,114	30–8	15–4
Apr 18	UT Rio Grande Valley		Pat Kenelly Diamond at Alumni Field • Hammond, LA	12–1	**Lirette, Luke (4–1)**	Cabaral, Angelo (4–1)	None	ESPN+	1,265	31–8	16–4
Apr 19	UT Rio Grande Valley		Pat Kenelly Diamond at Alumni Field • Hammond, LA	5–8	Wiatrek, Wyatt (6–0)	**Vosburg, Aiden (2-2)**	Tejada, Anthony (1)	ESPN+	1,055	31–9	16–5
Apr 22	Dillard*		Pat Kenelly Diamond at Alumni Field • Hammond, LA	Game canceled							
Apr 23	at No. 22 Southern Miss*		Pete Taylor Park • Hattiesburg, MS	4–5	Allen, Colby (4-4)	**Vosburg, Aiden (2–3)**	None	ESPN+	5,369	31–10	
Apr 25	at Houston Christian		Husky Field • Houston, TX	1–0	**Stuprich, Brennan (9–2)**	Edwards, Parker (1–3)	**St. Pierre, Brady (8)**	ESPN+	401	32–10	17–5
Apr 26	at Houston Christian		Husky Field • Houston, TX	4–5	Caravalho, Joshua (8–2)	**Lirette, Luke (4–2)**	Norton, Ben (6)	ESPN+	129	32–11	17–6
Apr 27	at Houston Christian		Husky Field • Houston, TX	10–2	**Webb, Truitt (1–0)**	Smith, Ben (3–5)	None	ESPN+	253	33–11	18–6
Apr 29	at No. 2 LSU*		Alex Box Stadium, Skip Bertman Field • Baton Rouge, LA	2–15	Schmidt, William (7–0)	**Ambrose, Chase (2–1)**	None	SECN+	10,821	33–12	

May (4–2)
Date	Opponent	Rank	Site/stadium	Score	Win	Loss	Save	TV	Attendance	Overall record	SLC Record
May 2	Lamar		Pat Kenelly Diamond at Alumni Field • Hammond, LA	0–5	Hunsaker, Riely (3–2)	**Stuprich, Brennan (9–3)**	None	ESPN+	1,195	33–13	18–7
May 3	Lamar		Pat Kenelly Diamond at Alumni Field • Hammond, LA	4–0	**Polk, Lakin (4–0)**	Olivier, Chris (6–2)	None	ESPN+	1,210	34–13	19–7
May 4	Lamar		Pat Kenelly Diamond at Alumni Field • Hammond, LA	7–4	**Lobell, Blake (6–1)**	Havard, Peyton (7–2)	**St. Pierre, Brady (9)**	ESPN+	1,202	35–13	20–7
May 6	South Alabama*		Pat Kenelly Diamond at Alumni Field • Hammond, LA	Game canceled							
May 8	at Nicholls		Ben Meyer Diamond at Ray E. Didier Field • Thibodaux, LA	0–13	Parache, Nuno (4–1)	**Stuprich, Brennan (9–4)**	None	ESPN+	911	35–14	20–8
May 10	at Nicholls		Ben Meyer Diamond at Ray E. Didier Field • Thibodaux, LA	5–4	**Webb, Truitt (2–0)**	Bordelon, Joseph (0–2)	None	ESPN+	899	36–14	21–8
May 10	at Nicholls		Ben Meyer Diamond at Ray E. Didier Field • Thibodaux, LA	19–4	**Lobell, Blake (7–1)**	Simoneaux, Cole (0–3)	None	ESPN+	711	37–14	22–8

Postseason ( 1–2 )

Southland Conference Tournament (Hammond Bracket) ( 1–2 )
Date	Opponent	(Seed)/Rank	Site/stadium	Score	Win	Loss	Save	TV	Attendance	Overall record	Tournament record
May 15	(8) New Orleans	(1)	Pat Kenelly Diamond at Alumni Field • Hammond, LA	6–10	Longshore, Zach (2–5)	**Stuprich, Brennan (9–5)**	Calloway, Bryce (9)	ESPN+	1,123	37–15	0–1
May 16	(5) McNeese	(1)	Pat Kenelly Diamond at Alumni Field • Hammond, LA	7–4	**St. Pierre, Brady (2–1)**	Jake Blackwell (3-3)	None	ESPN+	1,007	38–15	1–1
May 15	(4) Northwestern State	(1)	Pat Kenelly Diamond at Alumni Field • Hammond, LA	8–11	Talley, Corbin (1–0)	**Howell, Kaleb (0–1)**	None	ESPN+	1,125	38–16	1–2

Legend: = Win = Loss = Canceled
Bold = Southeastern Louisiana team member
Rankings are based on the team's current ranking in the D1Baseball poll.

Schedule source:

*Rankings are based on the team's current ranking in the D1Baseball poll. |}

== Conference awards and honors ==
=== Weekly awards ===
Weekly honors
Honors	Player	Position	Date Awarded	Ref.
SLC Baseball Pitcher of the Week	Brennan Stuprich	RHP	February 17, 2025	
SLC Baseball Pitcher of the Week	Brennan Stuprich	RHP	March 3, 2025	
SLC Baseball Pitcher of the Week	Blake Lobell	RHP	April 7, 2025	

== See also ==
2025 Southeastern Louisiana Lady Lions softball team
