= Gayle Hatch =

American athlete and coach

Gayle Hatch (born May 7, 1939) is an American athlete and coach who was the USA Weightlifting Senior U.S. International Coach.

Hatch served as Head Coach of the men’s USA Olympic Weightlifting Team at the 2004 Summer Olympics in Athens, Greece. Hatch is a member of the USA Strength and Conditioning Coaches Hall of Fame, the USA Weightlifting Hall of Fame and the American Indian Athletic Hall of Fame.

The Gayle Hatch Weightlifting Team has won 49 USA Weightlifting National Championships. Gayle Hatch athletes have competed in the 1984 Summer Olympics, the 1988 Summer Olympics and the 1992 Summer Olympics in weightlifting events. His athletes have participated on 12 USA World Teams. The lifters include Tommy Moffitt, Bret Brian, Tommy Calandro, Blair Lobrano, and Matt Bruce.

== High school and college ==
Hatch attended Catholic High School, where he played basketball under Coach Mel Didier. Hatch was the only freshman in the district playing on the varsity basketball team.

In 1957, Catholic High won the District Championship. Hatch set a record in the state play-off with a double/double 35.5 points and 22.5 rebounds per game in the top classification. Hatch scored 37 points and 24 rebounds, then the best double/double in the LHSAA’s top classification.

Hatch attended Northwestern State University in Louisiana. On December 12, 1961, Hatch scored 44 points and had 18 rebounds against Kentucky Wesleyan College. In that performance, he scored 18 of 21 field goal attempts (.857) which was a state college record and one of college basketball’s all-time best.

== Strength training ==
During the 1950s, Hatch started working with Alvin Roy in his strength program for high level athletes. Their students included Billy Cannon, Jimmy Taylor, and Bob Pettit.

After Roy retired, Hatch took over and expanded the Olympic Weightlifting program. “When Alvin got ready to sell his club in 1979, he told the group of owners that if they wanted to keep the strength and conditioning program going, then they should talk to Gayle Hatch,” Hatch, said. “They talked to me, and I ended up becoming the manager and strength coach, and I also added Olympic weightlifting to the program, which was the first Olympic-style weightlifting program in a commercial gym.”

During his career, Hatch mentored many other strength and conditioning coaches. During his training days, Gayle had the privilege of training well known power lifter Paul Talbot. "Out of 15 years of the BCS, I had my proteges win eight national championships," said Coach Hatch.

== Alvin Roy Award ==
On July 17, 2015, the National Strength and Conditioning Association (NSCA) presented Hatch with the Alvin Roy Award for Career Achievement. He received the award for producing champion athletes in Olympic Weightlifting and Football.
