= 2019 Grambling State Tigers baseball team =

American college baseball season

2019 Grambling State Tigers baseball
- Conference: Southwestern Athletic Conference
- Record: 27-25 (16-8 SWAC)
- Head coach: James Cooper (7th season)
- Assistant coaches: Davin Pierre; Elliott Jones
- Home stadium: Ralph Waldo Emerson Jones Park and Wilbert Ellis Field

2019 Southwestern Athletic Conference baseball standings
	Conf.				Overall
Team	W		L	PCT	W		L	PCT
East
Alabama State ^{x}‍‍‍	18	–	5	.783	28	–	26	.519
Jackson State ‍‍‍	15	–	9	.625	31	–	24	.564
Alabama A&M ‍‍‍	12	–	11	.522	16	–	35	.314
Alcorn State ‍‍‍	7	–	16	.304	14	–	31	.311
Mississippi Valley State ‍‍‍	6	–	17	.261	8	–	27	.229
West
Southern ^{x}‍‍‡‍^{y}	17	–	6	.739	32	–	24	.571
Grambling State ‍‍‍	16	–	8	.667	27	–	25	.519
Texas Southern ‍‍‍	13	–	11	.542	20	–	34	.370
Prairie View A&M ‍‍‍	9	–	14	.391	18	–	35	.340
Arkansas–Pine Bluff ‍‍‍	3	–	19	.136	8	–	42	.160
x – Division champion ‡ – Tournament champion y – Invited to the NCAA tournament As of June 5, 2019; Rankings from D1Baseball

The 2019 Grambling State Tigers baseball team represented Grambling State University in the 2019 NCAA Division I baseball season. The Tigers played their home games at Ralph Waldo Emerson Jones Park and Wilbert Ellis Field.

== Roster ==
2019 Grambling State Tigers roster
Pitchers: 1 D'Quan Matthews - Senior; 6 Ryan Huntington - Senior; 11 Jason Alvarez - Junior; 16 Jonathan Reid - Redshirt Senior; 17 Kerry Boykins, Jr. - Sophomore; 19 Andy Escano - Senior; 20 Santiago Hungria III - Freshman; 21 Bryan Delgado - Junior; 22 Jamary McKinney - Redshirt Junior; 26 Dejuan Van Dyke-McClain - Redshirt Freshman; 27 Kaelin Woodard - Junior; 29 Julien Martin - Redshirt Freshman; 32 JC Bonilla - Redshirt Sophomore; 34 Ryan Evans - Senior; 35 Grant Landry - Junior; Adrian Carroll - Freshman	Catchers: 30 Richard Ortiz - Senior; 31 Drexler Macaay - Senior; Infielders: 2 Ace Felder - Redshirt Senior; 4 CJ Mervilus - Freshman; 5 Kristian Franklin - Senior; 10 Garrett Smith - Senior; 12 Jahmoi Percival - Junior; 13 Keyaunte Jones - Redshirt Freshman; 18 Rafael Ramirez, III - Junior; 23 Jalin McMillan - Redshirt Junior; 24 Trevin Bolden - Senior; 28 Michael Sookdeo - Junior; 33 Jalen Heath -Redshirt Junior; Jake Lane - Freshman; Marc Newman, Jr - Freshman; Outfielders: 3 Warren Laster - Freshman; 8 Ian Bailey - Redshirt Sophomore; 14 Phil Adams Jr. - Redshirt Junior; 15 Isaiah Torres - Senior; 25 Nick Wheeler - Senior; 36 Jakobi Jackson - Freshman; Utility: 7 Kevin Whitaker Jr. - Junior

=== Coaching staff ===
2019 Grambling State Tigers coaching staff
- James Cooper – Head Coach – 7th year
- Davin Pierre – Assistant Coach/Recruiting Coordinator – 9th year
- Elliott Jones – Assistant Coach – 1st year
- Devin Washington – Team Videographer

== Schedule ==
2019 Grambling State Tigers Game Log
Regular season
February

#	Date	Opponent	Venue	Score	Overall record	SLC record
1	February 15	vs. Eastern Kentucky (Andre Dawson Classic)	Wesley Barrow Stadium • New Orleans, LA	W 7–4	1–0	
2	February 16	vs. Southern (Andre Dawson Classic)	Wesley Barrow Stadium • New Orleans, LA	L 5–6	1–1	
3	February 17	vs. Alabama State (Andre Dawson Classic)	Wesley Barrow Stadium • New Orleans, LA	W 3-1	2–1	
4	February 20	Jackson State	Ralph Waldo Emerson Jones Park and Wilbert Ellis Field • Grambling, LA	L 2–4	2–2	
5	February 22	at Nicholls	Ben Meyer Diamond at Ray E. Didier Field • Thibodaux, LA	L 1–6	2–3	
6	February 24	at Nicholls	Ben Meyer Diamond at Ray E. Didier Field • Thibodaux, LA	L 5–16	2–4	
7	February 24	at Nicholls	Ben Meyer Diamond at Ray E. Didier Field • Thibodaux, LA	L 2-7	2-5	
8	February 26	Wiley College	Ralph Waldo Emerson Jones Park and Wilbert Ellis Field • Grambling, LA	L 3–5	2–6	
8	February 26	Wiley College	Ralph Waldo Emerson Jones Park and Wilbert Ellis Field • Grambling, LA	W 8–3	3–6	

March

#	Date	Opponent	Venue	Score	Overall record	SWAC record
9	March 1	Texas Southern	Ralph Waldo Emerson Jones Park and Wilbert Ellis Field • Grambling, LA	W 12–2 (7 inn)	4–6	1-0
10	March 2	Texas Southern	Ralph Waldo Emerson Jones Park and Wilbert Ellis Field • Grambling, LA	L 3–7	4–7	1-1
11	March 2	Texas Southern	Ralph Waldo Emerson Jones Park and Wilbert Ellis Field • Grambling, LA	W 6–2	5–7	2-1
12	March 8	at Prairie View A&M	Tankersley Field • Prairie View, TX	W 9-1	6–7	3-1
13	March 9	at Prairie View A&M	Tankersley Field • Prairie View, TX	W 13–11	7–7	4-1
14	March 10	at Prairie View A&M	Tankersley Field • Prairie View, TX	L 15–18	7–8	4-2
15	March 13	at #7 Mississippi State	Dudy Noble Field, Polk–DeMent Stadium • Starkville, MS	L 1–18	7–9	4-3
16	March 15	Arkansas-Pine Bluff	Ralph Waldo Emerson Jones Park and Wilbert Ellis Field • Grambling, LA	W 11-0 (7 inn)	8–9	5-3
17	March 16	Arkansas-Pine Bluff	Ralph Waldo Emerson Jones Park and Wilbert Ellis Field • Grambling, LA	W 5–4 (10 inn)	9–9	6-3
18	March 17	Arkansas-Pine Bluff	Ralph Waldo Emerson Jones Park and Wilbert Ellis Field • Grambling, LA	W 4–1	10–9	7-3
19	March 19	at Jackson State	Braddy Field • Jackson, MS	L 2-10	10-10	
20	March 22	at Southern	Lee-Hines Field • Baton Rouge, LA	L 8-18 (8 inn)	10–11	7-4
21	March 23	at Southern	Lee-Hines Field • Baton Rouge, LA	L 13-15	10–12	7-5
22	March 24	at Southern	Lee-Hines Field • Baton Rouge, LA	L 8-13	10–13	7-6
23	March 26	Alcorn State	Ralph Waldo Emerson Jones Park and Wilbert Ellis Field • Grambling, LA	W 8-7	11–13	
24	March 29	at Abilene Christian	Crutcher Scott Field • Abilene, TX	L 4-7	11–14	
25	March 30	at Abilene Christian	Crutcher Scott Field • Abilene, TX	L 5–23 (7 inn)	11–15	
26	March 31	at Abilene Christian	Crutcher Scott Field • Abilene, TX	W 8–7	11–16	

April

#	Date	Opponent	Venue	Score	Overall record	SWAC record
27	April 2	at #9 LSU	Alex Box Stadium, Skip Bertman Field • Baton Rouge, LA	L 0-9	11–17	
28	April 5	at Texas Southern	MacGregor Park • Houston, TX	L 8–11	11–18	7–7
29	April 6	at Texas Southern	MacGregor Park • Houston, TX	W 7–2	12–18	8–7
30	April 6	at Texas Southern	MacGregor Park • Houston, TX	W 8–4	13–18	9–7
31	April 9	at Stephen F. Austin	Jaycees Field • Nacogdoches, TX	L 2-6	13-19	
32	April 12	Prairie View A&M	Ralph Waldo Emerson Jones Park and Wilbert Ellis Field • Grambling, LA	W 7–4	14–19	10–7
33	April 12	Prairie View A&M	Ralph Waldo Emerson Jones Park and Wilbert Ellis Field • Grambling, LA	L 7–10	14–20	10–8
34	April 14	Prairie View A&M	Ralph Waldo Emerson Jones Park and Wilbert Ellis Field • Grambling, LA	W 8–4	15–20	11–8
35	April 16	Mississippi Valley State	Ralph Waldo Emerson Jones Park and Wilbert Ellis Field • Grambling, LA	W 9–7	16–20	
36	April 20	at Arkansas-Pine Bluff	Torii Hunter Baseball Complex • Pine Bluff, AR	W 10-8 (11 inn)	17–20	12–8
37	April 20	at Arkansas-Pine Bluff	Torii Hunter Baseball Complex • Pine Bluff, AR	W 19–2 (7 inn)	18–20	13–8
38	April 21	at Arkansas-Pine Bluff	Torii Hunter Baseball Complex • Pine Bluff, AR	W 14–11	19–20	14-8
39	April 23	at Alcorn State	Foster Baseball Field at McGowen Stadium • Lorman, MS	W 14–7	20–20	
40	April 26	Southern	Ralph Waldo Emerson Jones Park and Wilbert Ellis Field • Grambling, LA	W 12–0 (7 inn)	21–20	15-8
41	April 27	Southern	Ralph Waldo Emerson Jones Park and Wilbert Ellis Field • Grambling, LA	W 21–16	22–20	16-8
42	April 28	Southern	Ralph Waldo Emerson Jones Park and Wilbert Ellis Field • Grambling, LA	L 3–15 (7 inn)	22–21	16-9
42	April 30	at #5 Arkansas	Dickey-Stephens Park • Little Rock, AR	L 3–17	22–22	

May

#	Date	Opponent	Venue	Score	Overall record	SWAC record
43	May 3	at Northwestern State	H. Alvin Brown–C. C. Stroud Field • Natchitoches, LA	W 7–6	23–22	
44	May 5	at Northwestern State	H. Alvin Brown–C. C. Stroud Field • Natchitoches, LA	L 2-11	23–23	
45	May 5	at Northwestern State	H. Alvin Brown–C. C. Stroud Field • Natchitoches, LA	L 4–5	23–24	

Postseason
SWAC Tournament

#	Date	Opponent	Venue	Score	Overall record	SWAC record
55	May 15	vs. Alcorn State	Wesley Barrow Stadium • New Orleans, LA	W 14–8 (8 inn)	24–24	
56	May 16	vs. Alabama State	Wesley Barrow Stadium • New Orleans, LA	L 3-5	24-25	
55	May 17	vs. Prairie View A&M	Wesley Barrow Stadium • New Orleans, LA	W 9–8	25–25	
55	May 17	vs. Alabama State	Wesley Barrow Stadium • New Orleans, LA	W 15-9	26–25	
55	May 18	vs. Alabama State	Wesley Barrow Stadium • New Orleans, LA	L 2-5	26–26	
