= José Vázquez (baseball) =

American college baseball coach and former catcher

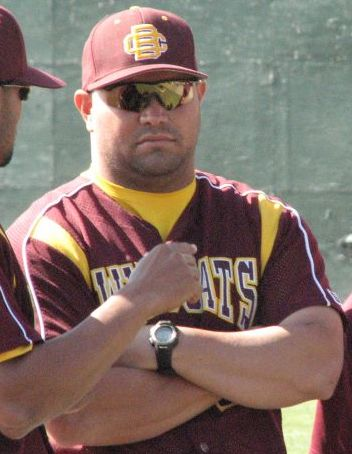
- Vázquez at Bethune-Cookman in 2007

Current position
- Title: Head coach
- Team: Alabama State
- Conference: SWAC
- Record: 295–207

Biographical details
- Born: Bayamon, Puerto Rico

Playing career
- 2001: Morningside College
- 2002: Bethune–Cookman
- Position: Catcher

Coaching career (HC unless noted)
- 2003: Bethune–Cookman (GA)
- 2004–2010: Bethune–Cookman (asst)
- 2011: Bethune–Cookman (AHC)
- 2012–2016: Alabama State (AHC)
- 2017–present: Alabama State

Head coaching record
- Overall: 295–207
- Tournaments: SWAC 12–11; NCAA: 0–4

Accomplishments and honors

Championships
- 4x SWAC East Division (2018, 2019, 2022, 2023); 3x SWAC tournament (2016, 2022, 2026)

Awards
- 4× SWAC Coach of the Year (2018, 2022–2024)

José Vázquez is an American college baseball coach and former catcher. Vázquez is the head coach of the Alabama State Hornets baseball team.

== Early life ==
Vázquez played baseball for Morningside College in 2001. Vázquez then transferred to Bethune–Cookman University for his senior season.

== Coaching career ==
On September 13, 2010, it was announced that he turned down the head coaching position at Florida A&M University. On July 14, 2016, he was named the head coach of the Alabama State Hornets baseball program.

== Head coaching record ==
Record table
Season	Team	Overall	Conference	Standing	Postseason
Alabama State Hornets (Southwestern Athletic Conference) (2017–present)
2017	Alabama State	31–25	18–6	2nd (East)	SWAC tournament
2018	Alabama State	30–22	18–6	1st (East)	SWAC tournament
2019	Alabama State	28–26	18–5	1st (East)	SWAC tournament
2020	Alabama State	14–4	3–0	(East)	Season canceled due to COVID-19
2021	Alabama State	23–19	14–7	2nd (East)	SWAC tournament
2022	Alabama State	34–25	21–8	1st (East)	NCAA Regional
2023	Alabama State	41–7	26–4	1st (East)	SWAC tournament
2024	Alabama State	29–27	17–12	4th (East)	SWAC tournament
2025	Alabama State	31–29	21–9	3rd	SWAC tournament
2026	Alabama State	34–23	20–10	4th	NCAA Regional
Alabama State:		295–207	156–57		
Total:		295–207			
National champion Postseason invitational champion Conference regular season champion Conference regular season and conference tournament champion Division regular season champion Division regular season and conference tournament champion Conference tournament champion

== See also ==
- List of current NCAA Division I baseball coaches
