= 2019 Southern Jaguars baseball team =

American college baseball season

2019 Southern Jaguars baseball
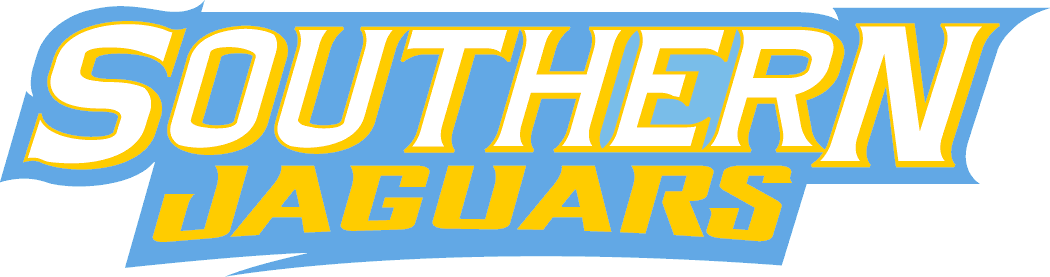

SWAC West Divisional Champions SWAC Conference Tournament Champions Starkville Regional Appearance
- Conference: Southwestern Athletic Conference
- West
- Record: 32-24 (18-6 SWAC)
- Head coach: Kerrick Jackson (2nd season)
- Assistant coaches: Christopher Crenshaw; Jerry Houston
- Home stadium: Lee–Hines Field

2019 Southwestern Athletic Conference baseball standings
	Conf.				Overall
Team	W		L	PCT	W		L	PCT
East
Alabama State ^{x}‍‍‍	18	–	5	.783	28	–	26	.519
Jackson State ‍‍‍	15	–	9	.625	31	–	24	.564
Alabama A&M ‍‍‍	12	–	11	.522	16	–	35	.314
Alcorn State ‍‍‍	7	–	16	.304	14	–	31	.311
Mississippi Valley State ‍‍‍	6	–	17	.261	8	–	27	.229
West
Southern ^{x}‍‍‡‍^{y}	17	–	6	.739	32	–	24	.571
Grambling State ‍‍‍	16	–	8	.667	27	–	25	.519
Texas Southern ‍‍‍	13	–	11	.542	20	–	34	.370
Prairie View A&M ‍‍‍	9	–	14	.391	18	–	35	.340
Arkansas–Pine Bluff ‍‍‍	3	–	19	.136	8	–	42	.160
x – Division champion ‡ – Tournament champion y – Invited to the NCAA tournament As of June 5, 2019; Rankings from D1Baseball

The 2019 Southern Jaguars baseball team represented Southern University in the 2019 NCAA Division I baseball season. The Jaguars played their home games at Lee–Hines Field. They, along with the LSU Tigers baseball team, and the McNeese State Cowboys baseball team, were the only three teams in the state to make it to the NCAA Tournament. They were also the lone member from the SWAC Conference.

== Roster ==
2019 Southern Jaguars roster
Pitchers: 15 Wilhelm Allen - Junior; 17 Connor Whalen - Senior; 18 Jacob Snyder - Junior; 20 Eli Finney - Junior; 21 John Guienze - Junior; 22 Charles Bailey - Junior; 23 Markaylon Boyd - Junior; 26 Austin Haensel - Sophomore; 30 Justin Freeman - Graduate; 31 Brandon Morris - Junior; 32 Joe Dattoli - Sophomore; 34 Christian Dixon - Freshman; 35 Khristian Paul - Redshirt Freshman; 36 Larry Barabino - Freshman; 39 Bryce Ross - Freshman; 40 Kimani Davis - Freshman; 50 Jackson Cullen - Junior; 51 Cole Jenkins - Senior; 52 Jerome Bohannon II - Junior	Catchers: 8 William Nelson - Sophomore; 11 Hunter David - Junior; 12 Eian Mitchell - Senior; 38 Bobby Johnson - Senior; Infielders: 0 Johnny Johnson - Junior; 1 Courtland Simoneaux - Sophomore; 2 Tyler LaPorte - Senior; 6 Willie Ward - Junior; 7 Malik Blaise - Senior; 9 Myles Blocker - Freshman; 10 Zavier Moore - Sophomore; 14 Leo Passley - Freshman; 25 Blake Martin - Freshman; 37 Coby Taylor - Junior; 44 Miles Pierre - Freshman	Outfielders: 3 Javeyan Williams - Senior; 4 Rashard Raine - Senior; 5 Ashanti Wheatley - Senior; 13 Michael Wright - Sophomore; 24 Hampton Hudson - Junior; Utility Players: 19 Peter Holden - Freshman; 28 Rhett Hebert - Freshman; 29 Brendon Davis - Freshman; 41 Blaine Hardy - Freshman

=== Coaching staff ===
2019 Southern Jaguars coaching staff
- Kerrick Jackson – Head Coach – 1st year
- Christopher Crenshaw – Assistant Coach – 1st year
- Jerry Houston – Assistant Coach – 1st year
- Theodore Perkins – Strength and Conditioning

== Schedule ==
2019 Southern Jaguars baseball game log
Regular season
February

#	Date	Opponent	Venue	Score	Overall record	SWAC record
1	February 15	vs. Florida A&M	Wesley Barrow Stadium • New Orleans, LA	W 6-3	1-0	
2	February 16	vs. Grambling State	Wesley Barrow Stadium • New Orleans, LA	W 6–5	2–0	
3	February 17	vs. Alcorn State	Maestri Field at Privateer Park • New Orleans, LA	W 12-9	3–0	
4	February 18	vs. Air Force	Alex Box Stadium, Skip Bertman Field • Baton Rouge, LA	L 0–13	3–1	
5	February 24	at Northwestern State	H. Alvin Brown–C. C. Stroud Field • Natchitoches, LA	L 6–13	3–2	
6	February 24	at Northwestern State	H. Alvin Brown-C. C. Stroud Field • Natchitoches, LA	W 7–5	4–2	
7	February 27	at LSU	Alex Box Stadium, Skip Bertman Stadium • Baton Rouge, LA	L 4-17	4-3	

March

#	Date	Opponent	Venue	Score	Overall record	SWAC record
9	March 1	Eastern Illinois	Lee–Hines Field • Baton Rouge, LA	W 10–8	5–3	
10	March 1	Eastern Illinois	Lee–Hines Field • Baton Rouge, LA	L 2–4	5–4	
11	March 2	Eastern Illinois	Lee–Hines Field • Baton Rouge, LA	W 5–3	6–4	
12	March 2	Eastern Illinois	Lee–Hines Field • Baton Rouge, LA	L 1–6	6–5	
13	March 6	at Southern Miss	Pete Taylor Park • Hattiesburg, MS	L 3–8	6–6	
14	March 8	Arkansas-Pine Bluff	Lee–Hines Field • Baton Rouge, LA	W 16–4	7–6	1-0
15	March 8	Arkansas-Pine Bluff	Lee–Hines Field • Baton Rouge, LA	W 9–4	8–6	2-0
16	March 9	Arkansas-Pine Bluf	Lee–Hines Field • Baton Rouge, LA	W 16-13	9–6	3-0
17	March 12	at Louisiana-Monroe	Warhawk Field • Monroe, LA	L 6–10	9–7	
18	March 15	at Texas Southern	MacGregor Park • Houston, TX	L 0–1	9–8	3–1
19	March 16	at Texas Southern	MacGregor Park • Houston, TX	W 1–0	10–8	4–1
20	March 17	at Texas Southern	MacGregor Park • Houston, TX	W 8-7	11–8	5-1
21	March 19	at Lamar	Vincent-Beck Stadium • Beaumont, TX	L 5-6	11–9	
22	March 22	Grambling State	Lee–Hines Field • Baton Rouge, LA	W 18-8 (8 inn)	12–9	6-1
23	March 23	Grambling State	Lee–Hines Field • Baton Rouge, LA	W 15-13	13–9	7-1
24	March 24	Grambling State	Lee–Hines Field • Baton Rouge, LA	W 13-8	14–9	8-1
25	March 26	at New Orleans	Maestri Field at Privateer Park • New Orleans, LA	L 6–9	14–10	
26	March 27	Northwestern State	Lee–Hines Field • Baton Rouge, LA	L 3–6	14–11	
24	March 29	Prairie View A&M	Lee–Hines Field • Baton Rouge, LA	L 6-10	14–12	8-2
24	March 30	Prairie View A&M	Lee–Hines Field • Baton Rouge, LA	W 26-7 (7 inn)	15–12	9-2
24	March 30	Prairie View A&M	Lee–Hines Field • Baton Rouge, LA	W 8-5	16–12	10-2

April

#	Date	Opponent	Venue	Score	Overall record	SLC record
27	April 2	at Nicholls	Ben Meyer Diamond at Ray E. Didier Field • Thibodaux, LA	L 2-4	16–13	
28	April 5	at Memphis	FedExPark • Memphis, TN	W 6–1	17–13	
29	April 6	at Memphis	FedExPark • Memphis, TN	L 1–10	17–14	
30	April 6	at Memphis	FedExPark • Memphis, TN	L 12–14 (12 inn)	17–15	
31	April 9	#8 LSU	Lee–Hines Field • Baton Rouge, LA	W 7–2	18–15	
32	April 10	New Orleans	Lee–Hines Field • Baton Rouge, LA	W 5–4 (10 inn)	19–15	
33	April 12	at Arkansas-Pine Bluff	Torii Hunter Baseball Complex • Pine Bluff, AR	W 10–4	20–15	11–2
34	April 12	at Arkansas-Pine Bluff	Torii Hunter Baseball Complex • Pine Bluff, AR	W 21–2 (7 inn)	21–15	12–2
35	April 14	at Arkansas-Pine Bluff	Torii Hunter Baseball Complex • Pine Bluff, AR	Game canceled		
36	April 16	Alcorn State	Lee–Hines Field • Baton Rouge, LA	W 11-1 (7 inn)	22–15	13–2
37	April 20	Texas Southern	Lee–Hines Field • Baton Rouge, LA	W 7–6 (12 inn)	23–15	14–2
38	April 20	Texas Southern	Lee–Hines Field • Baton Rouge, LA	L 5–6	23–16	14-3
39	April 21	Texas Southern	Lee–Hines Field • Baton Rouge, LA	W 16–6 (7 inn)	24–16	15-3
40	April 23	Louisiana-Monroe	Lee–Hines Field • Baton Rouge, LA	L 4–5	24–17	
41	April 26	at Grambling State	Ralph Waldo Emerson Jones Park at Wilbert Ellis Field • Grambling, LA	L 0–12	24–18	15–4
42	April 27	at Grambling State	Ralph Waldo Emerson Jones Park at Wilbert Ellis Field • Grambling, LA	L 16–21	24–19	15–5
42	April 28	at Grambling State	Ralph Waldo Emerson Jones Park at Wilbert Ellis Field • Grambling, LA	W 15–3 (7 inn)	25–19	16–5

May

#	Date	Opponent	Venue	Score	Overall record	SWAC record
43	May 1	Nicholls	Lee–Hines Field • Baton Rouge, LA	W 6–5	26–19	
44	May 4	at Prairie View A&M	Tankersley Field • Prairie View, TX	W 12-8	27–19	17–5
45	May 5	at Prairie View A&M	Tankersley Field • Prairie View, TX	W 6–4	28–19	18–5
46	May 5	at Prairie View A&M	Tankersley Field • Prairie View A&M	L 2–12 (7 inn)	28–20	18–6
47	May 7	at New Orleans	Maestri Field at Privateer Park • New Orleans, LA	L 4–5	28–21	

Post-season
SWAC Tournament

#	Date	Opponent	Venue	Score	Overall record	SWAC record
54	May 15	vs. Arkansas-Pine Bluff	Wesley Barrow Stadium • New Orleans, LA	W 11–7	29–21	
55	May 16	vs. Texas Southern	Wesley Barrow Stadium • New Orleans, LA	W 10-9 (10 inn)	30-21	
56	May 17	vs. Texas Southern	Wesley Barrow Stadium • New Orleans, LA	L 6-8	30-22	
57	May 18	vs. Texas Southern	Wesley Barrow Stadium • New Orleans, LA	W 7-6	31-22	
57	May 19	vs. Alabama State	Wesley Barrow Stadium • New Orleans, LA	W 15-0	32-22	

Historically Black Colleges and Universities (HBCU) World Series

#	Date	Opponent	Venue	Score	Overall record	SLC record
58	May 24	vs. North Carolina A&T	Guarantee Rate Field • Chicago, IL	Game canceled		

NCAA Tournament - Starkville Regional

#	Date	Opponent	Venue	Score	Overall record	SWAC record
58	May 31	vs. Mississippi State	Dudy Noble Field, Polk–DeMent Stadium • Starkville, MS	L 6-11	32-23	
58	June 1	vs. Miami	Dudy Noble Field, Polk–DeMent Stadium • Starkville, MS	L 2-12	32-24	

== Starkville Regional ==
Starkville Regional Teams
(1) Mississippi State Bulldogs	(2) Miami Hurricanes	(3) Central Michigan Chippewas	(4) Southern Jaguars

First Round
1	Mississippi State	11
4	Southern	6
3	Central Michigan	6
2	Miami	5
Lower round 1
4	Southern	2
2	Miami	12

Semi-Finals
1	Mississippi State	7
3	Central Michigan	2
Lower final
3	Central Michigan	3
2	Miami	18

Finals
1	Mississippi State
2	Miami
