= Kiki Baker Barnes =

American college athletics administrator, college women's basketball coach

Biographical details
- Born: Lake Charles, Louisiana, U.S.

Coaching career (HC unless noted)
- 2006–2013: Dillard

Administrative career (AD unless noted)
- 2006–2022: Dillard
- 2019–2022: HBCUAC (interim comm.)
- 2022–present: HBCUAC (commissioner)

Kiki Baker Barnes is an American college athletics administrator and former women's college basketball coach. She is the commissioner of the HBCU Athletic Conference (HBCUAC)—formerly known as the Gulf Coast Athletic Conference (GCAC)—a position she has held since 2022. Barnes served as the athletic director at Dillard University in New Orleans from 2006 and 2022 and as the head women's basketball coach at the school from 2006 to 2013.

== Early life and education ==
Barnes grew up in Minden, Louisiana. In 1995, she completed an associate degree in telecommunications from South Plains College. In 1997, she earned a bachelor's degree in communications from the University of New Orleans. Later in 2001, she completed a master's degree in communications with a concentration in public relations from the University of Louisiana at Lafayette. She completed her doctorate in higher education administration from the University of New Orleans.

== Career ==
Barnes held positions as an assistant basketball coach at the University of Louisiana at Lafayette, and afterward as an assistant basketball coach at Southern University in Baton Rouge, Louisiana and Frank Phillips College in Borger, Texas. She also served as the head basketball coach and spirit coordinator at Southern University at Shreveport.

In 2006, she was appointed athletic director and head women's basketball coach to oversee the revival of Dillard University's athletic program, which was suspended after Hurricane Katrina. Before assuming her role as the athletic director, she served as an assistant women's basketball coach at the university. During her tenure at Dillard, Barnes reestablished the men's and women's basketball programs and the women's volleyball team.

In 2009, she became the President of the Gulf Coast Athletic Conference (GCAC), and rebuilt it, after its members threatened its continued existence. She was voted athletic director of the Year, in 2011. In 2019, she was appointed as the interim commissioner of GCAC. In 2022, she was permanently appointed as the commissioner of GCAC.

In 2017, she also founded "So You Want A Career in Athletics", a leadership program for teenage girls.

== Personal life ==
Barnes married Marc Barnes Sr. They have two children, Caitlin and Marc Jr.

== Book ==
Barnes is the author of Dr. Kiki's Keys Workbook.

== Awards and recognition ==
- 2011, 2014, 2015 & 2021 Gulf Coast Athletic Conference Athletic Director of the Year
- 2013 Gambit's Top 40 Under 40
- 2014 Girl Scout Woman of Distinction
- 2014 People to Watch New Orleans Magazine
- 2015 Women Leaders in College Sports Administrator of the Year
- 2018 New Orleans Pelicans Black History Month Honoree
- 2018 Women of the Year New Orleans City Business
- 2019 NACDA Under Armour Athletic Director of the Year
- 2021 Nell Jackson Nike Executive of the Year
- 2023 & 2024 New Orleans 500 Most Influential, Involved, and Inspiring Executives
