= Health and Physical Education Building (disambiguation) =

Health and Physical Education Building may refer to:

- Health and Physical Education Building (LSUS), the name of a sports facility at Louisiana State University Shreveport
- Health and Physical Education Building (SUNO), the name of a sports facility at Southern University at New Orleans
