= HBCU Athletic Conference =

College athletic conference in the US

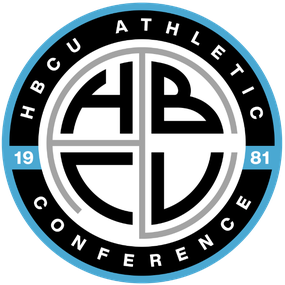
- Association: NAIA
- Founded: 1981; 45 years ago
- Commissioner: Kiki Baker Barnes
- Sports fielded: 9; men's: 4; women's: 5
- No. of teams: 16
- Region: Southern United States and U.S. Virgin Islands
- Website: hbcuac.org

Locations
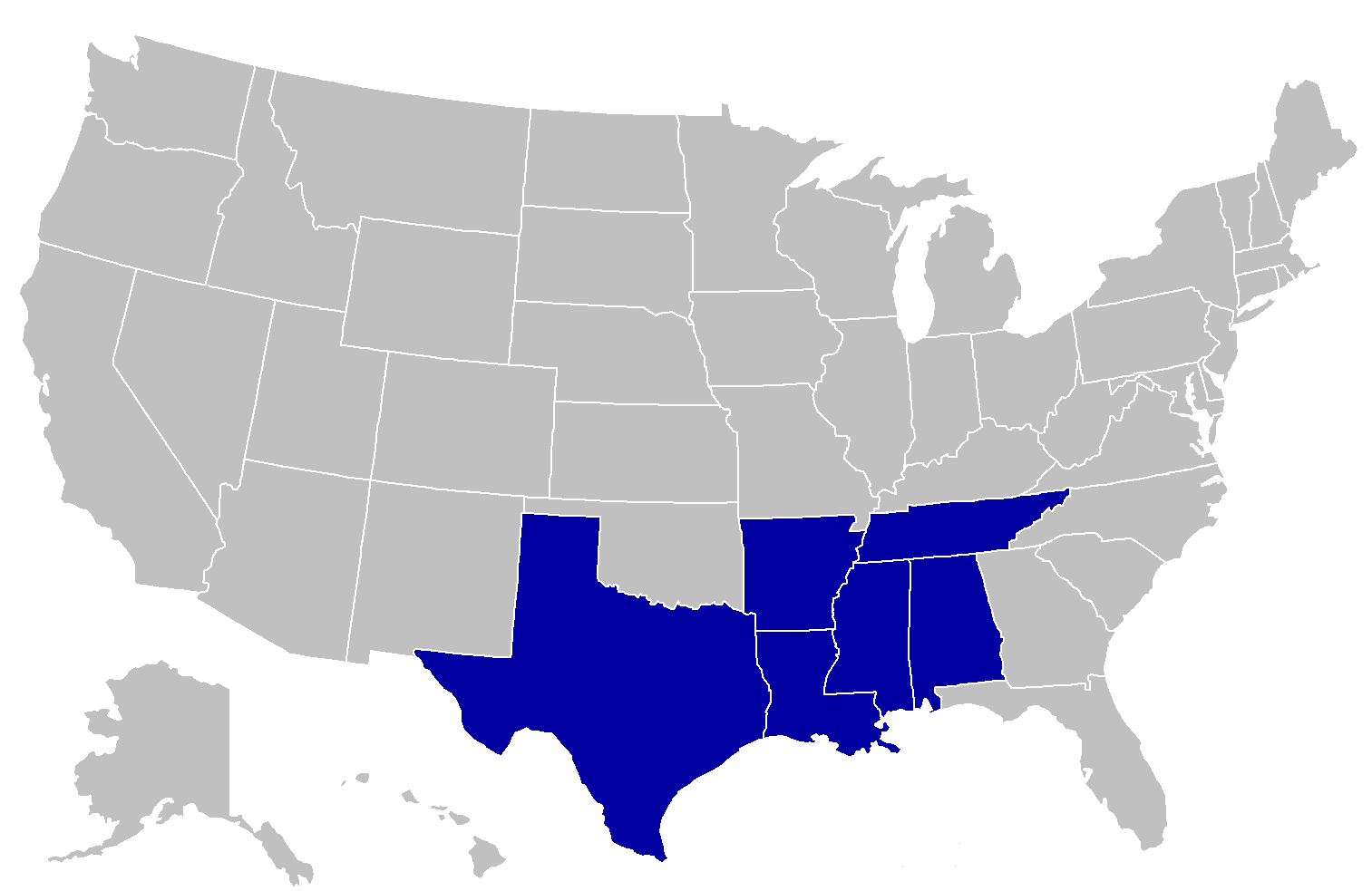

The HBCU Athletic Conference (HBCUAC), formerly known as the Gulf Coast Athletic Conference, is a college athletic conference made up entirely of historically black colleges and universities (HBCUs) that is affiliated with the National Association of Intercollegiate Athletics (NAIA). Member institutions are located in the states of Alabama, Arkansas, Louisiana, Mississippi, Ohio, South Carolina, Tennessee, and Texas as well as the U.S. territory of the U.S. Virgin Islands.

== History ==
HBCU Athletic Conference (Continental U.S.)
Location of HBCUAC members: full member, east division full member, west division future full member
HBCU Athletic Conference (U.S. Virgin Islands)
Location of HBCUAC members: full member, west division

The HBCUAC was established in 1981 as the Gulf Coast Athletic Conference (GCAC), with the following charter institutions: Belhaven University, Dillard University, Louisiana College (now Louisiana Christian University), Spring Hill College, Tougaloo College, William Carey University, and Xavier University of Louisiana. The first sports were men and women's basketball and men's tennis, with other sports soon following.

The University of Mobile was admitted in October 1985, Southern University at New Orleans was granted admission in May 1986, Loyola University was admitted in April 1995, and Louisiana State University in Shreveport became a member in April 2000. In 2005, Hurricane Katrina forced Dillard and Xavier (Louisiana) to cancel all athletic competition for the 2005–06 season and Loyola and Southern–New Orleans were able only to compete partially. All schools returned to competition in 2006–07, although in most cases with a reduced number of sports.

Louisiana College left the GCAC to join the American Southwest Conference of the National Collegiate Athletic Association (NCAA) Division III in 2000. Belhaven also left in 2000, only to re-join in 2002; while Talladega College, which joined in 1999, left in 2002. In 2010, Belhaven, Loyola–New Orleans, Spring Hill, Mobile, and William Carey left the GCAC to join the Southern States Athletic Conference (SSAC). In 2010 LSU–Shreveport left the conference to join the Red River Athletic Conference (RRAC). Edward Waters College (now a university) and Fisk University joined to replace the departed schools in 2010. Philander Smith College also joined the GCAC in 2011. Talladega College re-joined the conference starting in the 2011–12 academic year. Talladega had been a member of the GCAC from 1999–2000 to 2001–02.

On April 17, 2018, it was announced that Rust College had joined the GCAC in the 2018–19 season.

In 2019, Steve Martin resigned from the conference after 5 years to become commissioner of the Mississippi Association of Community and Junior Colleges.

In 2019, Southern University at New Orleans suspended its sports program.

On September 14, 2020, it was also announced that Xavier (La.) would leave the GCAC for the RRAC and on December 18, Talladega was accepted by the SSAC as a new member. Both departures became effective after the 2020–21 season concluded, coinciding with Fisk's return to the GCAC as published on March 16, 2021. On July 19, it was reported that Edward Waters would leave the GCAC to join NCAA Division II for the first time in its history and re-join the Southern Intercollegiate Athletic Conference the 2021–22 season.

In October 2021, Southern at New Orleans began to offer sports again after adding a student fee to fund them. On January 20, 2022, the GCAC extended its membership to Oakwood University and Wiley College, the conference's first Texas member, in addition to the returning Southern at New Orleans. Oakwood and Wiley joined the conference later in July. On November 3, the GCAC invited the University of the Virgin Islands to become its member in 2023–24, becoming the first four-year institution in a U.S. territory to join an athletic conference affiliated with the NAIA or NCAA in more than a century.

On February 29, 2024, the conference announced that it would rebrand as the HBCU Athletic Conference (HBCUAC), effective on July 1.

On April 21, 2026, the HBCUAC announced that it would add Jarvis Christian University as its 16th member of the conference, effective on July 1.

=== Chronological timeline ===
- 1981 – The Gulf Coast Athletic Conference (GCAC) was founded. Charter members included Belhaven College (now Belhaven University), Dillard University, Louisiana College (now Louisiana Christian University), Spring Hill College, Tougaloo College, William Carey College (now William Carey University), and Xavier University of Louisiana, beginning the 1981–82 academic year.
- 1985 – Mobile College (now the University of Mobile) joined the GCAC in the 1985–86 academic year.
- 1986 – Southern University at New Orleans joined the GCAC in the 1986–87 academic year.
- 1995 – Loyola University (now Loyola University New Orleans) joined the GCAC in the 1995–96 academic year.
- 1999 – Talladega College joined the GCAC in the 1999–2000 academic year.
- 2000 – Two institutions left the GCAC to join their respective new home primary conferences, both effective after the 1999–2000 academic year:
  - Belhaven to become an NAIA Independent
  - and Louisiana College to join the Division III ranks of the National Collegiate Athletic Association (NCAA) and the American Southwest Conference
- 2000 – Louisiana State University at Shreveport (a.k.a. Louisiana State–Shreveport or LSU Shreveport) joined the GCAC in the 2000–01 academic year.
- 2002 – Talladega left the GCAC to become an NAIA Independent after the 2001–02 academic year.
- 2002 – Belhaven rejoined the GCAC in the 2002–03 academic year.
- 2005 – Dillard and Xavier (La.) cancelled all athletic competition while Loyola (La.) and Southern–New Orleans competed in partial competition due to the aftermath of Hurricane Katrina during the 2005–06 academic year. All of the mentioned member schools would resume full-time athletic competition for the conference on the following season (2006–07 academic year).
- 2010 – Six institutions left the GCAC to join their respective new home primary conferences, all effective after the 2009–10 academic year:
  - Loyola (La.), Mobile, Spring Hill and William Carey (with Belhaven for a second time) to join the Southern States Athletic Conference (SSAC)
  - and Louisiana State–Shreveport (or LSU Shreveport) to join the Red River Athletic Conference (RRAC)
- 2010 – Edward Waters College (now Edward Waters University) and Fisk University joined the GCAC in the 2010–11 academic year.
- 2011 – Philander Smith College (now Philander Smith University) joined the GCAC (with Talladega rejoining) in the 2011–12 academic year.
- 2013 – Voorhees College (now Voorhees University) joined the GCAC in the 2013–14 academic year.
- 2014 – Fisk left the GCAC to become an NAIA Independent after the 2013–14 academic year.
- 2015 – Voorhees left the GCAC to become an NAIA Independent after the 2014–15 academic year.
- 2018 – Rust College joined the GCAC in the 2018–19 academic year.
- 2019 – Southern–New Orleans (SUNO) left the GCAC due to suspending its athletic program until further notice after the 2018–19 academic year.
- 2021 – Three institutions left the GCAC to join their respective new home primary conferences, all effective after the 2020–21 academic year:
  - Talladega for a second time to join the SSAC
  - Xavier (La.) to join the RRAC
  - and Edward Waters to join the NCAA Division II ranks and rejoining the Southern Intercollegiate Athletic Conference (SIAC); although Edward Waters would remain in the GCAC to compete in conference tournaments for all sponsored sports during the provisional transition until the end of the 2021–22 school year
- 2021 – Fisk rejoined the GCAC in the 2021–22 academic year.
- 2022 – Southern–New Orleans (SUNO) announced that it would reinstate its athletics program and rejoin the GCAC, along with new members Oakwood University and Wiley College (now Wiley University), beginning the 2022–23 academic year.
- 2023 – The University of the Virgin Islands (UVI) joined the GCAC in the 2023–24 academic year; thus making the first from a U.S. territory to join an NAIA or NCAA conference in the 21st century. Talladega also rejoined the GCAC for a third time.
- 2024 – Stillman College and Wilberforce University joined the GCAC (with Voorhees rejoining) in the 2024–25 academic year.
- 2024 – The GCAC was rebranded as the HBCU Athletic Conference (HBCUAC) in the 2024–25 academic year.
- 2025 – Huston–Tillotson University and Paul Quinn College joined the HBCUAC in the 2025–26 academic year.
- 2026 – Jarvis Christian University joined the HBCUAC, beginning the 2026–27 academic year.

Previous logo (until 2024)

Old logo (from early 1980s)

== Member schools ==
=== Current members ===
The HBCUAC currently has 16 full members, with all but two being private schools.

| Institution | Location | Founded | Affiliation (Note: Note: All core member institutions are Historically black colleges and universities.) | Enrollment | Nickname | Joined (Note: Represents the calendar year when fall sports competition begins.) |
|---|---|---|---|---|---|---|
| Dillard University | New Orleans, Louisiana | 1869 | United Methodist & United Church of Christ | 1,122 | Bleu Devils & Lady Bleu Devils | 1981 |
| Fisk University | Nashville, Tennessee | 1866 | United Church of Christ | 1,005 | Bulldogs | 2010; 2021 (Note: Fisk left the HBCUAC after the 2013–14 school year; before rejoining in 2021–22.) |
| Huston–Tillotson University | Austin, Texas | 1881 | United Methodist; Church of Christ | 1,029 | Rams | 2025 |
| Jarvis Christian University | Hawkins, Texas | 1912 | Disciples of Christ | 622 | Bulldogs | 2026 |
| Oakwood University | Huntsville, Alabama | 1896 | Seventh-day Adventist | 1,319 | Ambassadors | 2022 |
| Paul Quinn College | Dallas, Texas | 1872 | A.M.E. Church | 602 | Tigers | 2025 |
| Philander Smith University (Note: Formerly known as Philander Smith College until 2023.) | Little Rock, Arkansas | 1864 | United Methodist | 866 | Panthers | 2011 |
| Rust College | Holly Springs, Mississippi | 1866 | United Methodist | 429 | Bearcats | 2018 |
| Southern University at New Orleans (SUNO) | New Orleans, Louisiana | 1956 | Public | 2,059 | Knights & Lady Knights | 1986; 2022 (Note: Southern–New Orleans (SUNO) suspended its athletic program after the 2018–19 school year; and rejoined the HBCUAC in 2022–23 once reinstated.) |
| Stillman College | Tuscaloosa, Alabama | 1876 | Presbyterian (PCUSA) | 779 | Tigers | 2024 |
| Talladega College | Talladega, Alabama | 1867 | United Church of Christ | 837 | Tornadoes | 1999; 2011; 2023 (Note: Tallaedga left the HBCUAC after the 2001–02 school year; then rejoined from 2011–12 to 2020–21; before rejoining in 2023–24.) |
| Tougaloo College | Tougaloo, Mississippi | 1869 | United Church of Christ & Disciples of Christ | 725 | Bulldogs | 1981 |
| University of the Virgin Islands | Charlotte Amalie, U.S. Virgin Islands | 1962 | Public | 1,739 | Buccaneers | 2023 |
| Voorhees University | Denmark, South Carolina | 1897 | Episcopal | 515 | Tigers | 2013; 2024 (Note: Voorhees left the HBCUAC after the 2014–15 school year, before rejoining in 2024–25.) |
| Wilberforce University | Wilberforce, Ohio | 1856 | A.M.E. Church | 617 | Bulldogs | 2024 |
| Wiley University (Note: Formerly known as Wiley College until 2023.) | Marshall, Texas | 1873 | United Methodist | 636 | Wildcats | 2022 |

=== Former members ===
The HBCUAC had 9 former full members; all but one were private schools. Six of the nine were not HBCUs; all were members in the GCAC era, and left more than a decade before the 2024 conference renaming.

| Institution | Location | Founded | Affiliation | Enrollment | Nickname | Joined (Note: Represents the calendar year when fall sports competition begins.) | Left (Note: Represents the calendar year when spring sports competition ends.) | Subsequent conference(s) | Current conference |
|---|---|---|---|---|---|---|---|---|---|
| Belhaven University (Note: Formerly known as Belhaven College until 2010.) (Note: Not an HBCU.) | Jackson, Mississippi | 1883 | Evangelical; Presbyterian | 3,616 | Blazers | 1981; 2002 | 2000; 2010 | various (Note: Belhaven had joined the following subsequent conferences: as an NAIA Independent from 2000–01 to 2001–02; the Southern States Athletic Conference (SSAC) from 2010–11 to 2014–15; and the American Southwest Conference (Note: Currently an NCAA Division III athletic conference.) from 2015–16 to 2021–22.) | C.C. South (CCS) (2022–present) |
| Edward Waters College (Note: Currently known as Edward Waters University since 2021.) | Jacksonville, Florida | 1866 | A.M.E. Church (Note: Also a historically black college and university.) | 1,175 | Tigers | 2010 | 2021 (Note: Edward Waters remained in the HBCUAC to compete in conference tournaments for all sponsored sports during the provisional transition until after the 2021–22 school year.) | Southern (SIAC) (Note: Currently an NCAA Division II athletic conference.) (2021–present) | |
| Louisiana College (Note: Currently known as Louisiana Christian University since November 2021.) | Pineville, Louisiana | 1906 | Baptist | 950 | Wildcats | 1981 | 2000 | American Southwest (2000–21) | Red River (RRAC) (2021–present) |
| Louisiana State University at Shreveport | Shreveport, Louisiana | 1967 | Public | 9,736 | Pilots | 2000 (Note: The LSU Shreveport men's and women's basketball teams joined the HBCUAC three years after becoming a full member for other sports (2003–04).) | 2010 | Red River (RRAC) (2010–present) | |
| Loyola University New Orleans | New Orleans, Louisiana | 1904 | Catholic (Jesuit) | 4,351 | Wolf Pack | 1995 | 2010 | Southern States (SSAC) (2010–present) | |
| University of Mobile | Mobile, Alabama | 1961 | Baptist | 1,911 | Rams | 1985 | 2010 | Southern States (SSAC) (2010–present) | |
| Spring Hill College | Mobile, Alabama | 1830 | Catholic (Jesuit) | 977 | Badgers | 1981 | 2010 | Southern States (SSAC) (2010–14) | Southern (SIAC) (2014–present) |
| William Carey University | Hattiesburg, Mississippi | 1906 | Baptist | 5,448 | Crusaders | 1981 | 2010 | Southern States (SSAC) (2010–present) | |
| Xavier University of Louisiana | New Orleans, Louisiana | 1925 | Catholic (S.B.S.) | 3,181 | Gold Rush & Gold Nuggets | 1981 | 2021 | Red River (RRAC) (2021–present) | |

=== Membership timeline ===
Full member (non-football) Associate member (sport)

== Conference sports and Divisions ==
| | | | A divisional format is used for baseball, basketball (M/W), soccer (M/W), softball and volleyball (W). | |
| Conference sport | Men's | Women's | HBCUAC East | HBCUAC West |
|---|---|---|---|---|
| Baseball | ✓ | | Fisk | Dillard |
| Basketball | ✓ | ✓ | Oakwood | Huston-Tillotson |
| Cross Country | ✓ | ✓ | Rust | Paul Quinn |
| Soccer | ✓ | ✓ | Stillman | Philander Smith |
| Softball | | ✓ | Talladega | SUNO |
| Track & Field Outdoor | ✓ | ✓ | Voorhees | Tougaloo |
| Volleyball | | ✓ | Wilberforce | UVI |
| | | | | Wiley |

=== Women's sponsored sports by school ===
| School | Basketball | Cross Country | Outdoor T&F | Softball | Volleyball | Soccer | # Sports |
|---|---|---|---|---|---|---|---|
| Dillard | Yes | Yes | Yes | Yes | Yes | | 5 |
| Fisk | Yes | Yes | Yes | | Yes | | 4 |
| Huston-Tillotson | Yes | Yes | Yes | Yes | Yes | Yes | 6 |
| Oakwood | Yes | | | Yes | Yes | Yes | 4 |
| Paul Quinn | Yes | Yes | Yes | | Yes | Yes | 5 |
| Philander | Yes | Yes | Yes | | Yes | | 4 |
| Rust | Yes | Yes | Yes | Yes | Yes | | 5 |
| Stillman | Yes | Yes | Yes | Yes | Yes | | 5 |
| SUNO | Yes | | | | Yes | | 2 |
| Talladega | Yes | Yes | Yes | Yes | Yes | Yes | 6 |
| Tougaloo | Yes | Yes | | | Yes | Yes | 4 |
| UVI | Yes | Yes | Yes | | | | 3 |
| Voorhees | Yes | Yes | Yes | Yes | | | 4 |
| Wilberforce | Yes | Yes | Yes | | Yes | | 4 |
| Wiley | Yes | Yes | Yes | Yes | Yes | Yes | 6 |
| Totals | 15 | 13 | 12 | 8 | 13 | 6 | |

=== Men's sponsored sports by school ===
| School | Baseball | Basketball | Cross Country | Soccer | Outdoor T&F | HBCUAC Sports |
|---|---|---|---|---|---|---|
| Dillard | Yes | Yes | Yes | | Yes | 4 |
| Fisk | Yes | | Yes | | Yes | 3 |
| Huston-Tillotson | Yes | Yes | Yes | Yes | Yes | 5 |
| Oakwood | Yes | Yes | | Yes | | 3 |
| Paul Quinn | | Yes | Yes | Yes | Yes | 4 |
| Philander | Yes | Yes | Yes | | Yes | 4 |
| Rust | Yes | Yes | Yes | | Yes | 4 |
| Stillman | Yes | Yes | Yes | | Yes | 4 |
| SUNO | Yes | Yes | | | | 2 |
| Talladega | Yes | Yes | Yes | Yes | Yes | 5 |
| Tougaloo | Yes | Yes | Yes | Yes | | 4 |
| UVI | | Yes | Yes | | Yes | 3 |
| Voorhees | Yes | Yes | Yes | | Yes | 4 |
| Wilberforce | Yes | Yes | Yes | | Yes | 4 |
| Wiley | Yes | Yes | Yes | Yes | Yes | 5 |
| Totals | 13 | 14 | 13 | 6 | 12 | |

=== Sports not sponsored by the HBCUAC (now combined men's and women's) ===
| School | Bowling (M) | Bowling (W) | Flag FB | Golf (M) | Golf (W) | Gymnastics (W) | Tennis (M) | Tennis (W) |
|---|---|---|---|---|---|---|---|---|
| Dillard | | | | | | | Yes | Y |
| Fisk | | | | Yes | Yes | Yes | | |
| Rust | | | | | | | Yes | Y |
| Stillman | Yes | Yes | | | | | | |
| Wilberforce | | | Yes | | | Yes | | |
| Totals | 1 | 1 | 1 | 1 | 1 | 2 | 2 | 2 |

== Conference champions ==
=== Baseball ===
| Year | Regular season champion | Tournament champion |
|---|---|---|
| 2015 | Edward Waters College | Talladega College |
| 2014 | Talladega College | Talladega College |
| 2013 | N/A | N/A |
| 2012 | N/A | N/A |
| 2011 | N/A | N/A |
| 2010 | Belhaven College | Louisiana State University Shreveport |
| 2009 | William Carey University | Belhaven College |
| 2008 | University of Mobile | cancelled |
| 2007 | Belhaven College | Louisiana State University Shreveport |
| 2006 | Belhaven College | Louisiana State University Shreveport |
| 2005 | Louisiana State University Shreveport | William Carey University |
| 2004 | William Carey University | Belhaven College |
| 2003 | William Carey University | none |
| 2002 | Loyola University New Orleans | none |
| 2001 | Spring Hill College | none |
| 2000 | Spring Hill College | none |
| 1999 | University of Mobile | none |
| 1998 | University of Mobile | none |
| 1997 | Spring Hill College | none |
| 1996 | William Carey University | none |
| 1995 | William Carey University | none |
| 1994 | Belhaven College | none |
| 1993 | William Carey University | none |
| 1992 | William Carey University | none |
| 1991 | William Carey University | none |
| 1990 | William Carey University | none |
| 1989 | William Carey University | none |
| 1988 | William Carey University | none |
| 1987 | Louisiana College | none |
| 1986 | William Carey University | none |
| 1985 | Spring Hill College | none |
| 1984 | William Carey University | none |
| 1983 | William Carey University; Spring Hill College | none |
| 1982 | William Carey University | none |
