= 2018 Southwestern Athletic Conference baseball tournament =

Tournament

- Teams: 8
- Format: Double elimination
- Finals site: Wesley Barrow Stadium; New Orleans, LA
- Champions: Texas Southern (5th title)
- Winning coach: Michael Robertson (3rd title)
- MVP: O. J. Oloruntimilehin (Texas Southern)
- Television: ESPNews (Championship)

2018 Southwestern Athletic Conference baseball standings
	Conf.				Overall
Team	W		L	PCT	W		L	PCT
East
Alabama State ‍‍‍	18	–	6	.750	30	–	22	.577
Jackson State ‍‍‍	17	–	7	.708	34	–	18	.654
Alabama A&M ‍‍‍	9	–	15	.375	12	–	37	.245
Mississippi Valley State ‍‍‍	9	–	15	.375	11	–	35	.239
Alcorn State ‍‍‍	7	–	17	.292	13	–	39	.250
West
Texas Southern ‍‍‍	17	–	6	.739	27	–	28	.491
Grambling State ‍‍‍	14	–	10	.583	26	–	26	.500
Arkansas–Pine Bluff ‍‍‍	12	–	10	.545	20	–	25	.444
Prairie View A&M ‍‍‍	8	–	16	.333	14	–	40	.259
Southern ‍‍‍	6	–	15	.286	9	–	33	.214
‡ – Tournament champion As of June 14, 2018; Rankings from Collegiate Baseball

The 2018 Southwestern Athletic Conference baseball tournament was at Wesley Barrow Stadium in New Orleans, Louisiana, from May 16 through 20. As winner of the tournament, Texas Southern earned the conference's automatic bid to the 2018 NCAA Division I baseball tournament.

The double elimination tournament features four teams from each division.

== Seeding and format ==
The four eligible teams in each division were seeded one through four, with the top seed from each division facing the fourth seed from the opposite division in the first round, and so on. The teams then played a two bracket, double-elimination tournament with a one-game final between the winners of each bracket.

== Bracket ==
First round
1E	Alabama State	7
4W	Prairie View	2
2W	Grambling State	14
3E	Mississippi Valley State	5
4W	Prairie View	13
3E	Mississippi Valley State	1
1W	Texas Southern	10
4E	Alcorn State	3
2E	Jackson State	13
3W	Arkansas-Pine Bluff	3
4E	Alcorn State	14
3W	Arkansas-Pine Bluff	13

Second round
1E	Alabama State	7
2W	Grambling State	12
4W	Prairie View	2
1E	Alabama State	4
1W	Texas Southern	8
2E	Jackson State	4
4E	Alcorn State	3
2E	Jackson State	4

Semifinals
2W	Grambling State	1	5
1E	Alabama State	5	1
1W	Texas Southern	10	X
2E	Jackson State	9	X

Finals
2W	Grambling State	3
1W	Texas Southern	18
