= 2026 Southwestern Athletic Conference baseball tournament =

- Teams: 8
- Format: Double-elimination
- Finals site: Rickwood Field; Birmingham, Alabama
- Champions: Alabama State (3rd title)
- Winning coach: José Vázquez (3rd title)
- MVP: Miguel Oropeza (Alabama State)
- Television: ESPN+

2026 Southwestern Athletic Conference baseball standings
	Conf.				Overall
Team	W		L	PCT	W		L	PCT
Bethune–Cookman ‍†‍‍	23	–	7	.767	37	–	18	.673
Southern ‍‍‍	20	–	7	.741	23	–	22	.511
Florida A&M ‍‍‍	22	–	8	.733	28	–	22	.560
Alabama State ‍‍‡‍^{y}	20	–	10	.667	30	–	21	.588
Grambling State ‍‍‍	18	–	12	.600	21	–	29	.420
Texas Southern ‍‍‍	15	–	12	.556	19	–	22	.463
Jackson State ‍‍‍	16	–	14	.533	23	–	25	.479
Arkansas–Pine Bluff ‍‍‍	16	–	14	.533	22	–	32	.407
Prairie View A&M ‍‍‍	10	–	18	.357	12	–	35	.255
Mississippi Valley State ‍‍‍	8	–	22	.267	12	–	36	.250
Alabama A&M ‍‍‍	5	–	25	.167	8	–	43	.157
Alcorn State ‍‍‍	3	–	25	.107	4	–	42	.087
† – Conference champion ‡ – Tournament champion y – Invited to the NCAA Tournament; As of May 17, 2026; Rankings from D1Baseball

The 2026 Southwestern Athletic Conference baseball tournament was held from May 20 through 24 at Rickwood Field in Birmingham, Alabama. The top eight regular season finishers of the conference's twelve teams met in the double-elimination tournament, and were split into two double-elimination brackets of four. The winner of each bracket then played a single-game championship.

The Alabama State Hornets won the championship game against the Florida A&M Rattlers.

== Seeding and format ==
The top eight finishers of the league's twelve teams qualify for the double-elimination tournament. Teams are seeded based on conference winning percentage, with the first tiebreaker being head-to-head record.

== Bracket ==
First round
3	Florida A&M	8
6	Texas Southern	6
2	Southern	4^{10}
7	Jackson State	3
6	Texas Southern	8
7	Jackson State	7
1	Bethune–Cookman	4
8	Arkansas–Pine Bluff	6
4	Alabama State	10^{8}
5	Grambling State	0
5	Grambling State	6
1	Bethune–Cookman	7

Second round
3	Florida A&M	15
2	Southern	6
6	Texas Southern	4
2	Southern	6
8	Arkansas Pine–Bluff	7
4	Alabama State	8
1	Bethune–Cookman	8
8	Arkansas Pine–Bluff	13

Semifinals
3	Florida A&M	5	–
2	Southern	1	–
4	Alabama State	8	–
8	Arkansas-Pine Bluff	5	–

Finals
3	Florida A&M	6
4	Alabama State	8

== Schedule ==
Game	Time*	Matchup^{#}	Score	Notes	Reference
Wednesday, May 20
1	9:00 am	No. 6 Texas Southern vs No. 3 Florida A&M	6–8		
2	12:00 pm	No. 5 Grambling State vs No. 4 Alabama State	0–10		
3	3:00 pm	No. 7 Jackson State vs No. 2 Southern	3–4 (10)		
4	6:00 pm	No. 8 Arkansas-Pine Bluff vs No. 1 Bethune-Cookman	6–4		
Thursday, May 21
5	9:00 am	No. 6 Texas Southern vs No. 7 Jackson State	8–7	Jackson State Eliminated	
6	12:00 pm	No. 5 Grambling State vs No. 1 Bethune-Cookman	6–7	Grambling State Eliminated	
7	3:00 pm	No. 3 Florida A&M vs No. 2 Southern	15–6		
Friday, May 22
8	9:00 am	No. 4 Alabama State vs No. 8 Arkansas-Pine Bluff	8–7	Play was suspended at 12:08pm after the end of the 3rd due to weather and resumed at 5:15pm.	
9	8:00 pm	No. 6 Texas Southern vs No. 2 Southern	4–6	Texas Southern Eliminated	
Saturday, May 23
10	9:00 am	No. 1 Bethune-Cookman vs No. 8 Arkansas-Pine Bluff	8–13	Bethune-Cookman Eliminated	
11	1:00 pm	No. 3 Florida A&M vs No. 2 Southern	5–1	Southern Eliminated	
12	8:45 pm	No. 8 Arkansas-Pine Bluff vs No. 4 Alabama State	5–8	Arkansas-Pine Bluff Eliminated	
Sunday, May 24
13	4:15 pm	No. 4 Alabama State vs No. 3 Florida A&M	8–6	Alabama State Wins Championship	

== All-Tournament Team ==
Player	Team
Ryan Hunter	Southern
Andrey Martinez	Bethune-Cookman
Vinny Saumell	Arkansas-Pine Bluff
Aaron Grant	Arkansas-Pine Bluff
Alex Monile	Florida A&M
Jesus Campa	Florida A&M
Jackson McKenzie	Florida A&M
Jay Campbell	Florida A&M
Fabian Santana	Alabama State
James Peterson	Alabama State
Jorhan LaBoy	Alabama State
**Miguel Oropeza**	Alabama State

MVP in bold
