= 2019 Southwestern Athletic Conference baseball tournament =

- Teams: 8
- Format: Double elimination
- Finals site: Wesley Barrow Stadium; New Orleans, Louisiana
- Champions: Southern (27th title)
- Winning coach: Kerrick Jackson (1st title)
- MVP: Tyler LaPorte ((Southern))
- Television: SWAC DN (Friday & Saturday); ESPNews (Championship)

2019 Southwestern Athletic Conference baseball standings
	Conf.				Overall
Team	W		L	PCT	W		L	PCT
East
Alabama State ^{x}‍‍‍	18	–	5	.783	28	–	26	.519
Jackson State ‍‍‍	15	–	9	.625	31	–	24	.564
Alabama A&M ‍‍‍	12	–	11	.522	16	–	35	.314
Alcorn State ‍‍‍	7	–	16	.304	14	–	31	.311
Mississippi Valley State ‍‍‍	6	–	17	.261	8	–	27	.229
West
Southern ^{x}‍‍‡‍^{y}	17	–	6	.739	32	–	24	.571
Grambling State ‍‍‍	16	–	8	.667	27	–	25	.519
Texas Southern ‍‍‍	13	–	11	.542	20	–	34	.370
Prairie View A&M ‍‍‍	9	–	14	.391	18	–	35	.340
Arkansas–Pine Bluff ‍‍‍	3	–	19	.136	8	–	42	.160
x – Division champion ‡ – Tournament champion y – Invited to the NCAA tournament As of June 5, 2019; Rankings from D1Baseball

The 2019 Southwestern Athletic Conference baseball tournament was held at Wesley Barrow Stadium in New Orleans, Louisiana, from May 15 through 19. The winner of the tournament, Southern, earned the conference's automatic bid to the 2019 NCAA Division I baseball tournament.

The double elimination tournament featured four teams from each division.

== Seeding and format ==
The four eligible teams in each division will be seeded one through four, with the top seed from each division facing the fourth seed from the opposite division in the first round, and so on. The teams then play a two bracket, double-elimination tournament with a one-game final between the winners of each bracket.

== Bracket ==
First round
1E	Alabama State	11
4W	Prairie View A&M	4
2W	Grambling State	14
3E	Alcorn State	4
4W	Prairie View A&M	4
3E	Alcorn State	1
1W	Southern	11
4E	Arkansas-Pine Bluff	7
2E	Jackson State	4
3W	Texas Southern	5
4E	Arkansas-Pine Bluff	4
2E	Jackson State	14

Second round
1E	Alabama State	5
2W	Grambling State	3
4W	Prairie View A&M	8
2W	Grambling State	9
1W	Southern	10
3W	Texas Southern	9
2E	Jackson State	3
3W	Texas Southern	6

Semifinals
1E	Alabama State	9	5
2W	Grambling State	15	2
1W	Southern	6	7
3W	Texas Southern	8	6

Finals
1E	Alabama State	0
1W	Southern	15

== Game summaries ==
=== Conference championship ===
SWAC Championship Game
(1E) Alabama State Hornets	vs.	(1W) Southern Jaguars

May 19, 2019, 3:30 pm at Wesley Barrow Stadium in New Orleans, Louisiana, 73 °F (23 °C), overcast
Team	1	2	3	4	5	6	7	8	9	R	H	E
(1W) Southern	1	2	0	0	4	3	4	0	1	15	16	0
(1E) Alabama State	0	0	0	0	0	0	0	0	0	0	3	0
WP: Eli Finney (6–2) LP: Darren Kelly (6–3); Home runs: SOU: Tyler LaPorte (1); Bobby Johnson (1); ASU: None
