= Wilbert Ellis Field at Ralph Waldo Emerson Jones Park =

Baseball venue in Grambling, Louisiana

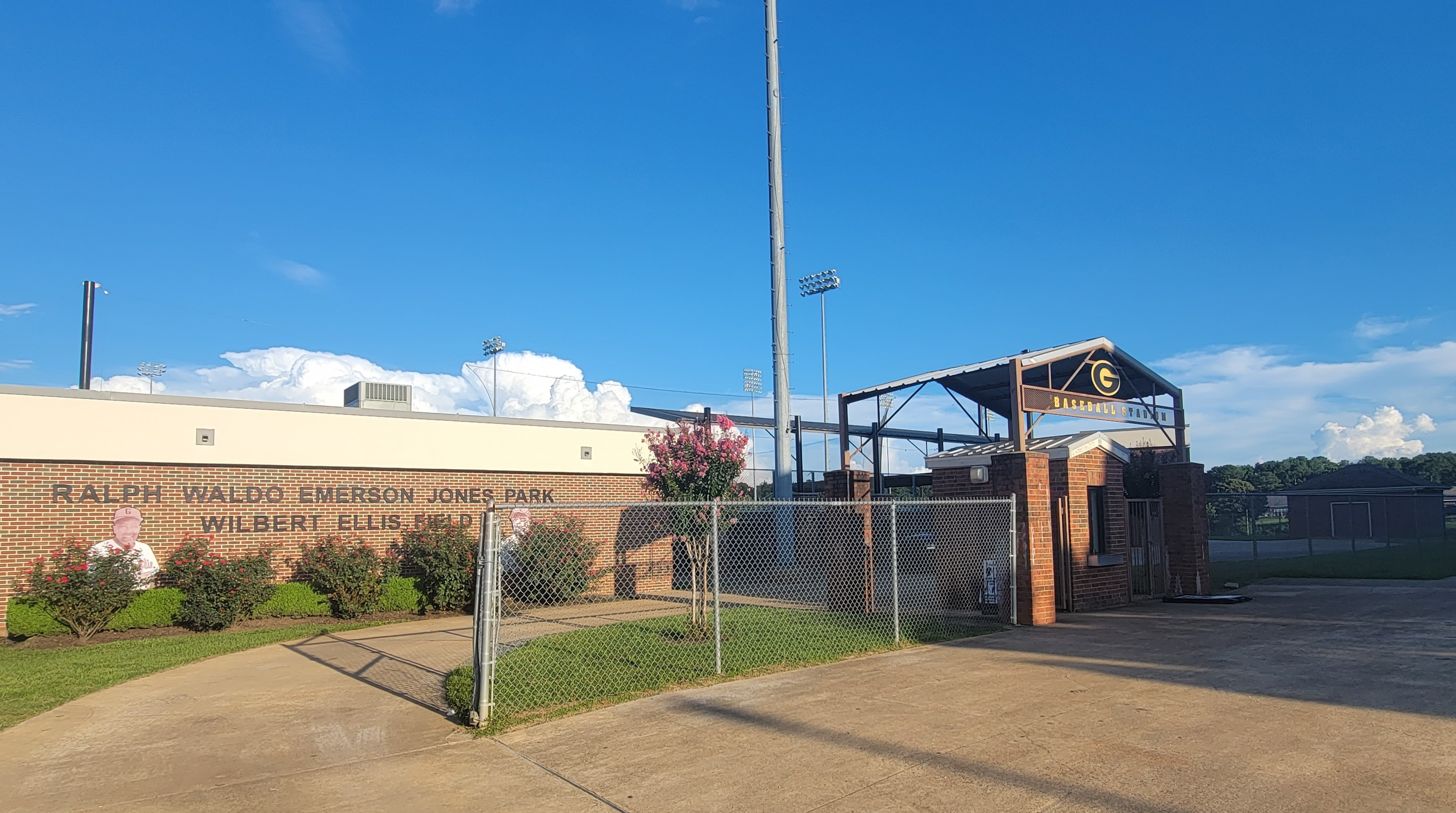
- Interactive map of Wilbert Ellis Field at Ralph Waldo Emerson Jones Park
- Location: Grambling, Louisiana, United States
- Coordinates: 32.5252°N 92.7153°W
- Owner: Grambling State University
- Operator: Grambling State University
- Capacity: 1,100
- Surface: Natural grass
- Scoreboard: Electronic

Tenant
- Grambling State Tigers baseball (NCAA)

Wilbert Ellis Field at Ralph Waldo Emerson Jones Park is a baseball venue in Grambling, Louisiana, United States.

It is home to the Grambling State Tigers baseball team of the NCAA Division I Southwestern Athletic Conference. The field is named after Wilbert Ellis, former head baseball coach, and the park is named after Grambling's second president, Ralph Waldo Emerson Jones.

== See also ==
- Grambling State Tigers baseball
- List of NCAA Division I baseball venues
