= Southern–New Orleans Knights and Lady Knights =

- University: Southern University at New Orleans
- Nickname: Knights and Lady Knights
- NAIA: Division I
- Conference: GCAC
- Location: New Orleans, Louisiana
- Varsity teams: 4
- Basketball arena: Health and Physical Education Building
- Baseball stadium: Wesley Barrow Stadium
- Website: www.sunoathletics.com

The Southern–New Orleans Knights and Lady Knights are the athletic teams that represent Southern University at New Orleans, located in New Orleans, Louisiana, in intercollegiate sports as a member of the National Association of Intercollegiate Athletics (NAIA), primarily competing in the Gulf Coast Athletic Conference (GCAC) since the 2022–23 academic year; which they were a member on a previous stint from 1986–87 to 2018–19 (their final season before the school suspended its athletics program and eventually re-instating it back).

The university has garnered over 150 NAIA All-American honors in its athletic programs.

== Return ==
On January 20, 2022, SUNO re-instated its athletic program and received an invitation to re-join back to the GCAC, along with Oakwood University (from the United States Collegiate Athletic Association (USCAA)) and Wiley College, effective beginning in July 2022.

== Sports sponsored ==
SUNO competes in four intercollegiate varsity sports: Men's sports included baseball and basketball; while women's sports included basketball and volleyball.

| Men's sports | Women's sports |
|---|---|
| Baseball | Basketball |
| Basketball | Volleyball |

=== Baseball ===
The Southern–New Orleans Knights baseball team represents Southern University at New Orleans in New Orleans, Louisiana, United States. The school's team currently competes in the Gulf Coast Athletic Conference, which is part of the National Association of Intercollegiate Athletics. The team plays its home games at 650-seat Wesley Barrow Stadium. Baseball was added to the athletics program for the first time in 2024.

=== Basketball ===
==== Men's basketball ====
The Southern–New Orleans Knights men's basketball team represents Southern University at New Orleans in New Orleans, Louisiana, United States. The school's team currently competes in the Gulf Coast Athletic Conference, which is part of the National Association of Intercollegiate Athletics. The team plays its home games at the 1,200-seat Health and Physical Education Building also known as "The Castle".

SUNO's men basketball teams have appeared in six NAIA tournaments.

==== Women's basketball ====
The Southern–New Orleans Lady Knights women's basketball team represents Southern University at New Orleans in New Orleans, Louisiana, United States. The school's team currently competes in the Gulf Coast Athletic Conference, which is part of the National Association of Intercollegiate Athletics. The team plays its home games at the 1,200-seat Health and Physical Education Building also known as "The Castle".

The women's basketball team has appeared in one NAIA Tournament.

=== Women's volleyball ===
The Southern–New Orleans Lady Knights women's volleyball team represents Southern University at New Orleans in New Orleans, Louisiana, United States. The school's team currently competes in the Gulf Coast Athletic Conference, which is part of the National Association of Intercollegiate Athletics. The team plays its home matches at the 1,200-seat Health and Physical Education Building also known as "The Castle".

== Former varsity sports ==
=== Men's and women's track and field ===
The Southern–New Orleans Knights and Lady Knights track and field teams represented Southern University at New Orleans in New Orleans, Louisiana, United States. The school's teams competed in outdoor track and field in the Gulf Coast Athletic Conference, which is part of the National Association of Intercollegiate Athletics.

The men's track & field team placed 2nd in nation at the NCAA Division III outdoor championships in 1974 and at the NAIA outdoor national outdoor championships in 1998.

Former head coach Dr. Artis Davenport was named NAIA Women's Indoor and Outdoor as well as Men's Outdoor Track & Field Coach of the Year in 1995. He earned the same honor in 1997 for Indoor Track & Field. The track and field team garnered 6 NAIA All-American honors at the NAIA 2008 Indoor Track & Field Championships.

Two Olympians have competed in SUNO's Track & Field Program. They include Savatheda Fynes (Bahamas) and Julius Achon (Uganda).

== Championships ==
Southern–New Orleans holds five national championships between NCAA Division III and NAIA.

National Championships
| | NCAA Div. III | NAIA |
|---|---|---|
| Sport | Men's Outdoor; Track & Field | Women's Outdoor/Indoor; Track & Field |
| Years | 1975, 1976, 1977 | 1995, 1997 |

Conference Championships
| Sport | Women's Cross Country | Men's Cross Country |
| Years | 1986, 1988, 1989; 1990 | 1988, 1989 |
| Sport | Men's Basketball | Women's Basketball |
| Years | 1995^{a}, 2000, 2003^{a} 2002^{c}, 2004^{c} | 2000^{b} |
*^atournament & conference champions ^bconference co-champions^ctournament and conference co-champions

== Athletic facilities ==
=== Current facilities ===
- Health and Physical Education Building
  The Health and Physical Education Building nicknamed The Castle, is the 1,200-seat arena for the men's and women's basketball teams and women's volleyball team. It opened in 1974.
- Wesley Barrow Stadium
  Wesley Barrow Stadium is a 650-seat baseball and softball stadium located in the Pontchartrain Park section of New Orleans, Louisiana. The stadium includes a 200-square-foot climate-controlled press box, a public address system and LED scoreboard. The baseball field features professional-sized artificial turf with a clay pitcher's mound and two fenced bullpens.

== See also ==
- Gulf Coast Athletic Conference
- National Association of Intercollegiate Athletics
