= Dillard Bleu Devils and Lady Bleu Devils =

Teams of Dillard University in New Orleans, United States

- University: Dillard University
- Nickname: Bleu Devils and Lady Bleu Devils
- NAIA: Division I
- Conference: HBCU Athletic Conference
- Athletic director: Linda Bell
- Location: New Orleans, Louisiana
- Varsity teams: 12
- Basketball arena: Dent Hall
- Baseball stadium: Wesley Barrow Stadium
- Other venues: Dillard University Tennis Center
- Colors: Royal blue and white
- Website: www.dillardbleudevils.com

The Dillard Bleu Devils and Lady Bleu Devils are the athletic teams that represent Dillard University, located in New Orleans, Louisiana, United States, in intercollegiate athletics as a member of the Division I level of the National Association of Intercollegiate Athletics (NAIA), competing in the HBCU Athletic Conference (HBCUAC)—formerly known as the Gulf Coast Athletic Conference (GCAC)—since the 1981–82 academic year.

== Varsity teams ==
Dillard competes in 12 intercollegiate varsity sports. Men's sports include baseball, basketball, cross country, tennis, and track and field, while women's sports include basketball, cross country, tennis, track and field, and volleyball. Co-ed sports include cheerleading and dance.

Men's sports	Women's sports	Co-ed sports
Baseball	Basketball	Cheerleading
Basketball	Cross country	Dance
Cross country	Tennis	
Tennis	Track and field	
Track and field	Volleyball	

=== Baseball ===
The Dillard Bleu Devils baseball team represents Dillard University in New Orleans, Louisiana, United States. The school's team currently competes in the Gulf Coast Athletic Conference, which is part of the National Association of Intercollegiate Athletics. The team plays its home games at 650-seat Wesley Barrow Stadium.

=== Men's basketball ===
The Dillard Bleu Devils men's basketball team represents Dillard University in New Orleans, Louisiana, United States. The school's team currently competes in the Gulf Coast Athletic Conference, which is part of the National Association of Intercollegiate Athletics. The team plays its home games at 1,500-seat Dent Hall.

=== Women's basketball ===
The Dillard Lady Bleu Devils women's basketball team represents Dillard University in New Orleans, Louisiana, United States. The school's team currently competes in the Gulf Coast Athletic Conference, which is part of the National Association of Intercollegiate Athletics. The team plays its home games at 1,500-seat Dent Hall.

=== Men's and women's cross country ===
The Dillard Blue Devils and Lady Bleu Devils men's and women's cross country teams represents Dillard University in New Orleans, Louisiana, United States. The school's teams currently competes in the Gulf Coast Athletic Conference, which is part of the National Association of Intercollegiate Athletics.

=== Men's and women's tennis ===
The Dillard Blue Devils and Lady Bleu Devils men's and women's tennis teams represents Dillard University in New Orleans, Louisiana, United States. The school's teams currently competes in the Gulf Coast Athletic Conference, which is part of the National Association of Intercollegiate Athletics. The team plays its home matches at the Dillard University Tennis Center.

=== Men's track and field ===
The Dillard Blue Devils track and field team represents Dillard University in New Orleans, Louisiana, United States. The school's team currently competes in outdoor track and field in the Gulf Coast Athletic Conference, which is part of the National Association of Intercollegiate Athletics.

=== Women's track and field ===
The Dillard Lady Blue Devils track and field team represents Dillard University in New Orleans, Louisiana, United States. The school's team currently competes in outdoor track and field in the Gulf Coast Athletic Conference, which is part of the National Association of Intercollegiate Athletics.

=== Women's volleyball ===
The Dillard Lady Bleu Devils women's volleyball team represents Dillard University in New Orleans, Louisiana, United States. The school's team currently competes in the Gulf Coast Athletic Conference, which is part of the National Association of Intercollegiate Athletics. The team plays its home games at 1,500-seat Dent Hall.

== Former varsity sports ==
=== Football ===
Dillard University formerly sponsored a varsity football team starting in 1935. The team was suspended for the 1965 season and then disbanded. The team played at Dillard Stadium.

== Athletic facilities ==
=== Current facilities ===
- Dent Hall
  Dent Hall is the university's gymnasium and was named in honor of Dr. Albert W. Dent, the university's third president. It was built in 1969 and is the home of the Bleu Devils and the Lady Bleu Devils basketball teams and volleyball team. A weight center and an Olympic-size swimming pool are also located in the building.
- Dillard University Tennis Center
  Dillard University Tennis Center is the university's tennis facility.
- Wesley Barrow Stadium
  Wesley Barrow Stadium is a 650-seat baseball and softball stadium located in the Pontchartrain Park section of New Orleans, Louisiana. The stadium includes a 200-square-foot climate-controlled press box, a public address system and LED scoreboard. The baseball field features professional-sized artificial turf with a clay pitcher's mound and two fenced bullpens.

=== Former facilities ===
- Dillard Stadium
  Dillard Stadium is a former stadium on the campus of Dillard University. It was the former home of the Dillard football team. The stadium was located off of Gentilly Road in New Orleans.
- Henson Hall
  Henson Hall is the university's old gymnasium and is named in honor of the explorer and co-discoverer of the North Pole, Matthew Alexander Henson. It was built in 1950.
