= Lee–Hines Field =

Baseball stadium in Baton Rouge, Louisiana, US

Lee–Hines Stadium
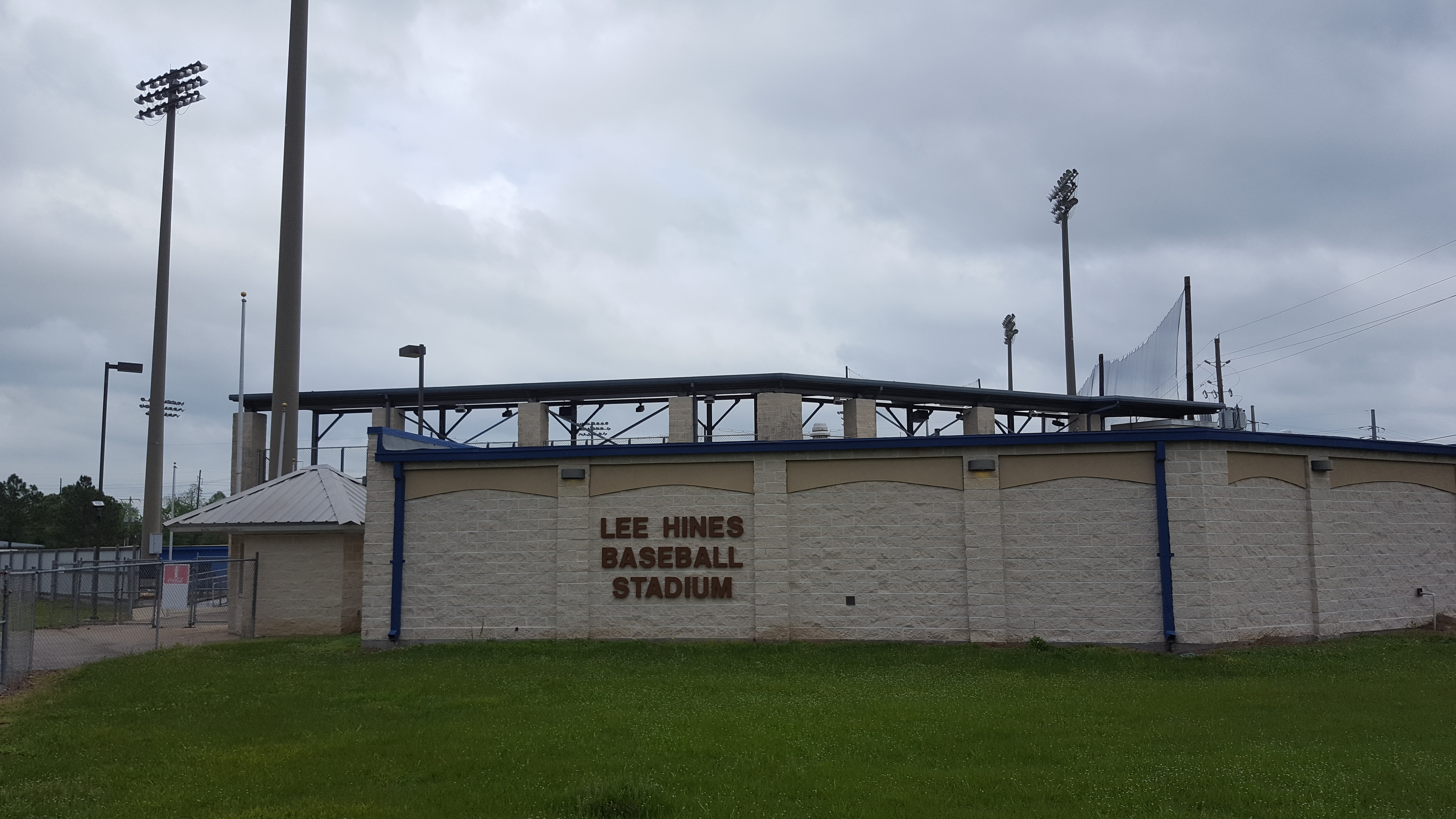
- Interactive map of Lee–Hines Stadium
- Location: Baton Rouge, Louisiana, United States
- Coordinates: 30.5209475°N 91.1838949°W
- Owner: Southern University
- Operator: Southern University
- Capacity: 1,500
- Surface: Natural grass
- Scoreboard: Electronic

Construction
- Opened: 1992

Tenant
- Southern Jaguars baseball (NCAA) (1992–present)

Lee–Hines Stadium is a baseball stadium in Baton Rouge, Louisiana. It is the home field of the Southern Jaguars baseball team.

== Tournaments ==
Lee–Hines Stadium served as host of the 2008 Southwestern Athletic Conference baseball tournament from May 13 through 17. The stadium hosted the 2012 Southwestern Athletic Conference baseball tournament from May 16 through 20, 2012, which was won by Prairie View A&M.

== Gallery ==
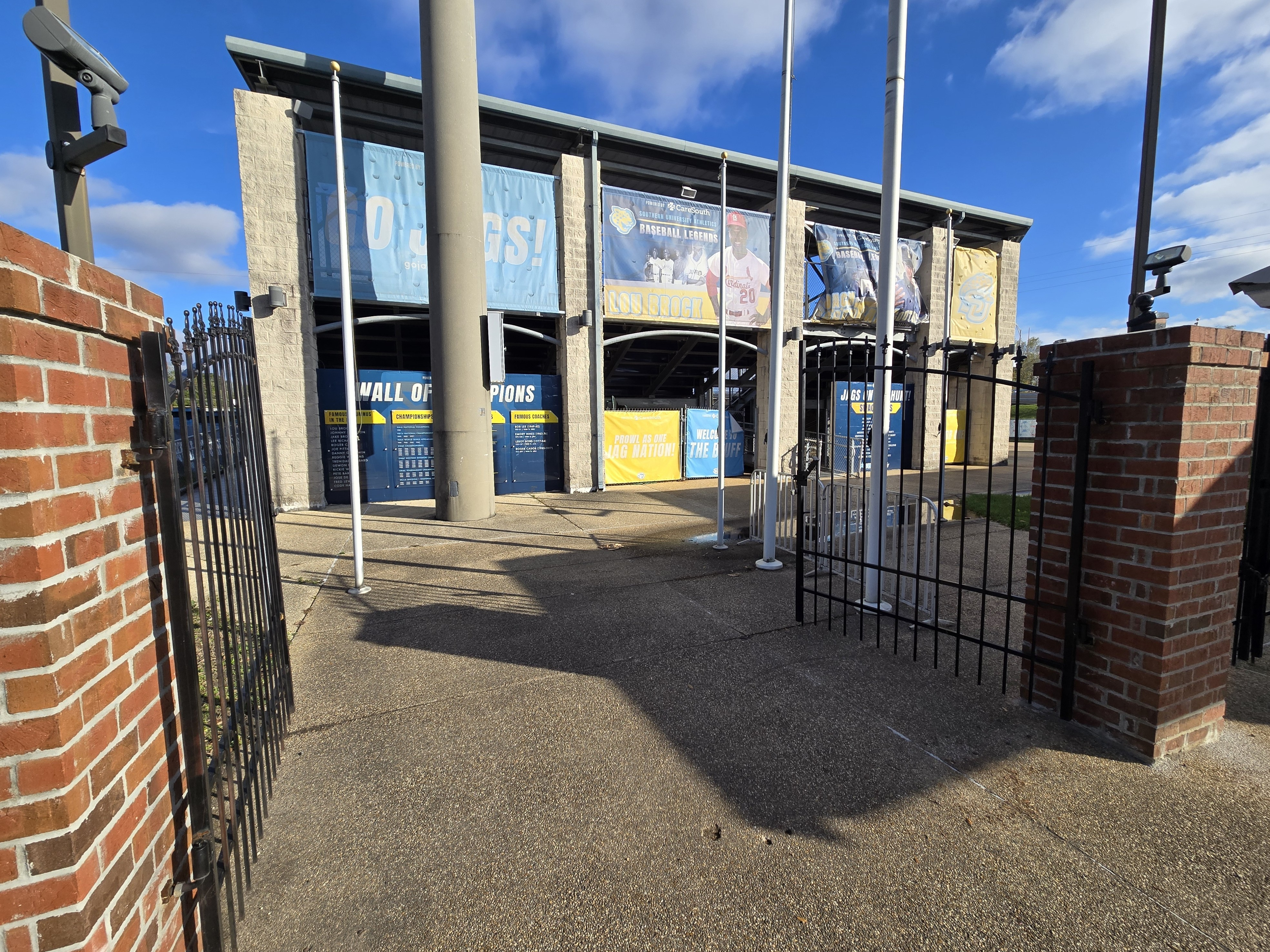
Lee–Hines Stadium Grandstand exterior

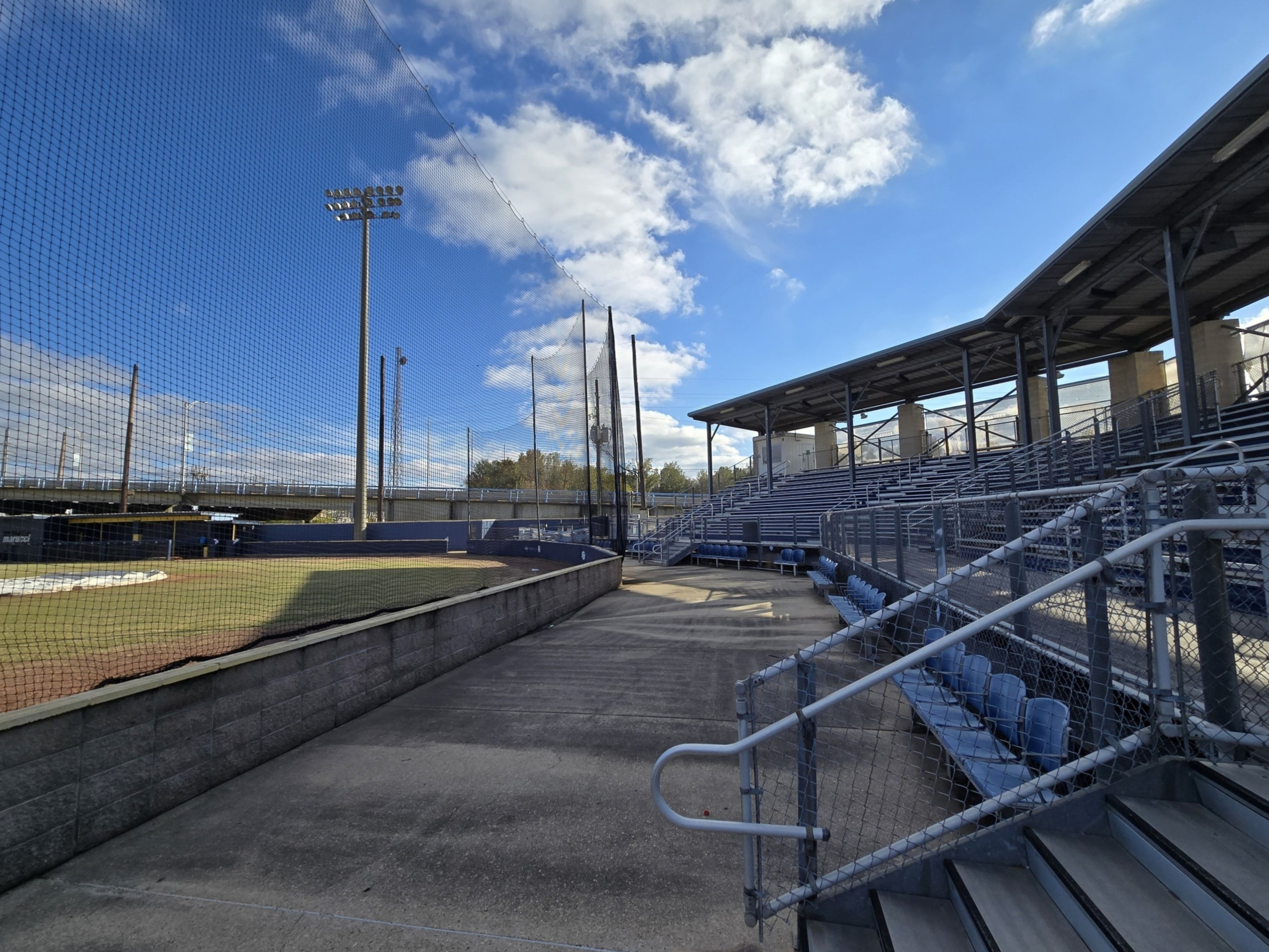
Lee–Hines Stadium Grandstand

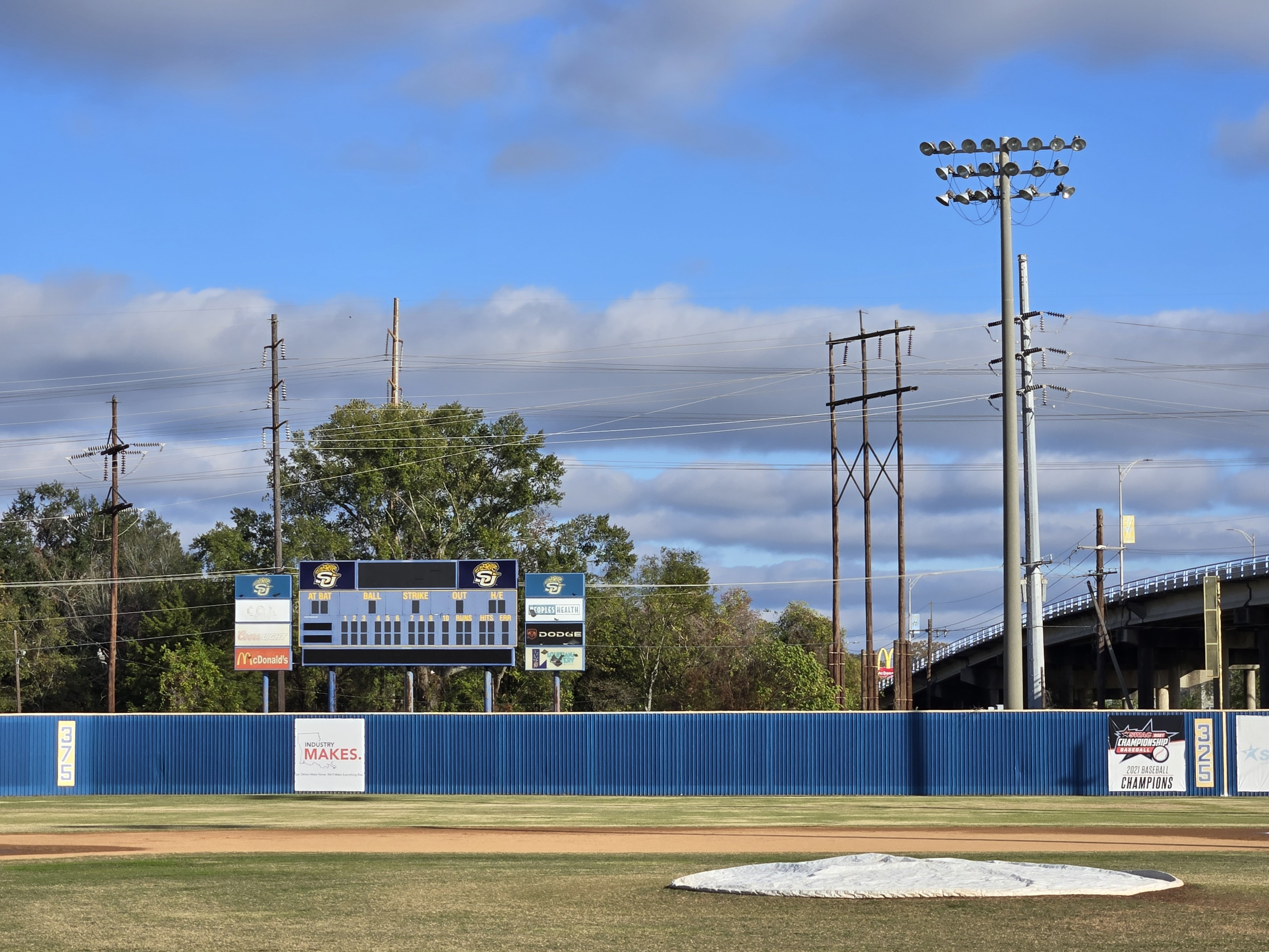
Lee–Hines Stadium Scoreboard

== See also ==
- List of NCAA Division I baseball venues
