= Wesley Barrow Stadium =

Baseball stadium in New Orleans, Louisiana

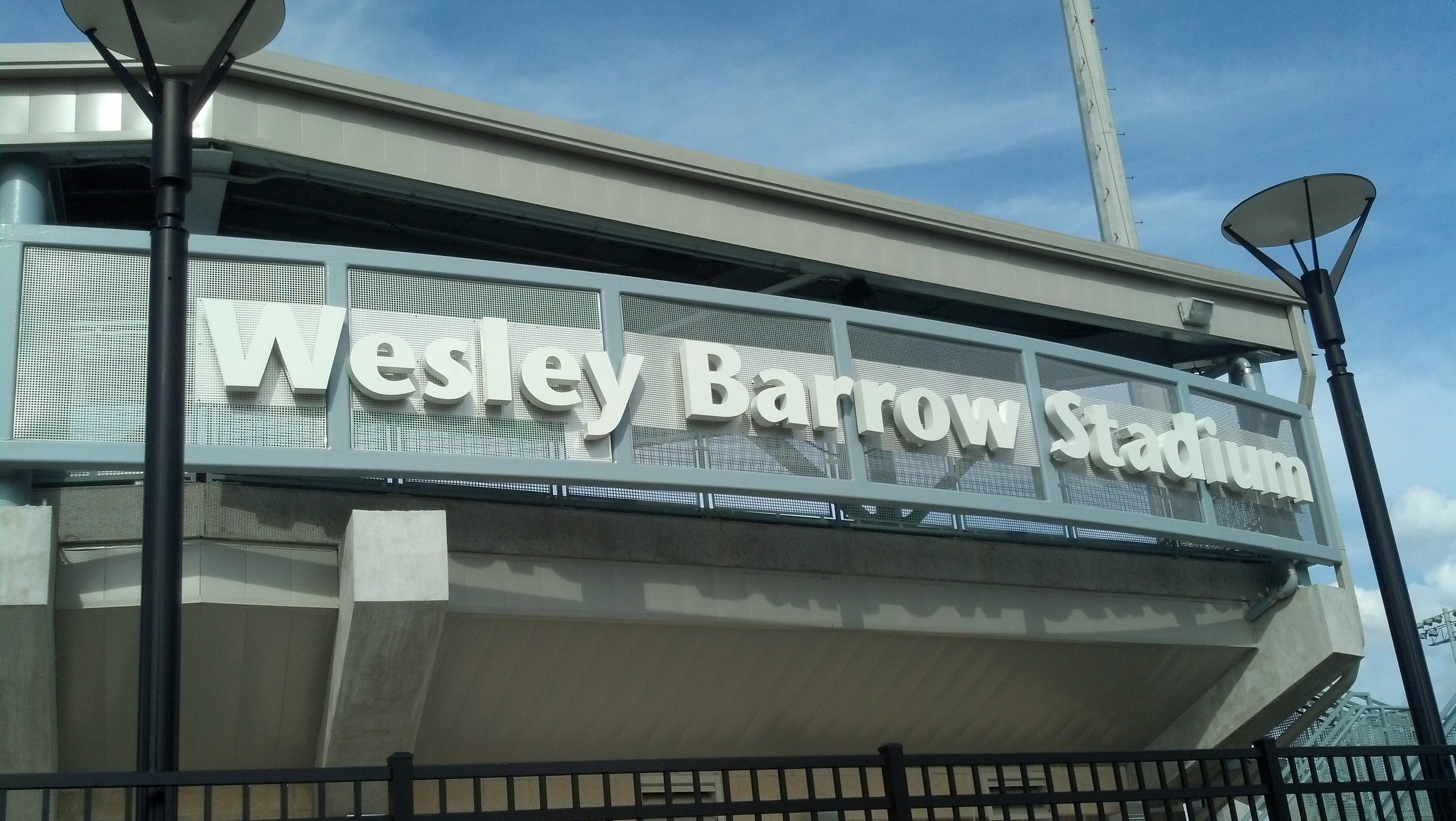
- Interactive map of Wesley Barrow Stadium
- Location: 6500 Press Drive; New Orleans, LA 70126
- Coordinates: 30.02836°N 90.04268°W
- Capacity: 650
- Surface: Artificial Turf

Construction
- Opened: 1957
- Architect: SCNZ Architects
- General contractors: Ryan Gootee General Contractors, LLC

Tenants
- LHSAA (baseball) (1957–Present); Loyola Wolfpack (baseball) (1991–2002); MLB Urban Youth Academy (2012–Present); UNO Privateers (baseball) (2013); Xavier Gold Rush (baseball) (2021–2024); Xavier Gold Nuggets (softball) (2021–2024); Dillard Bleu Devils (baseball) (2024–present); Southern–New Orleans Knights (baseball) (2024–present)

Wesley Barrow Stadium is a 650-seat baseball and softball stadium located in the Pontchartrain Park section of New Orleans, Louisiana. Named in memory of Negro league baseball manager Wesley Barrow, a longtime prominent figure in the New Orleans baseball community, the stadium includes a 200-square-foot climate-controlled press box, a public address system and LED scoreboard. The baseball field features professional-sized artificial turf with a clay pitcher's mound and two fenced bullpens.

The facility also includes grass tee-ball fields, a three-lane outdoor batting practice cage and a two-lane indoor batting practice building. It also includes administration facilities and two 300-square-foot conference rooms.

It is the current site of the Major League Baseball Youth Academy in New Orleans. The academy will provide free, year-round baseball and softball instruction and other educational services for youth from underserved and urban communities throughout southern Louisiana.

== History ==
Wesley Barrow Stadium was built in 1957 and has served as the home for Louisiana High School Athletic Association baseball games, Loyola Wolfpack baseball and UNO Privateers baseball in 2013.

The facility was destroyed by Hurricane Katrina, but after a 6.5 million renovation was reopened in 2012. The funding was provided by Major League Baseball, the city of New Orleans and the Federal Emergency Management Agency (FEMA).

In 2021, the stadium became the home field for the Xavier University Gold Nuggets women's softball team.

== Gallery ==
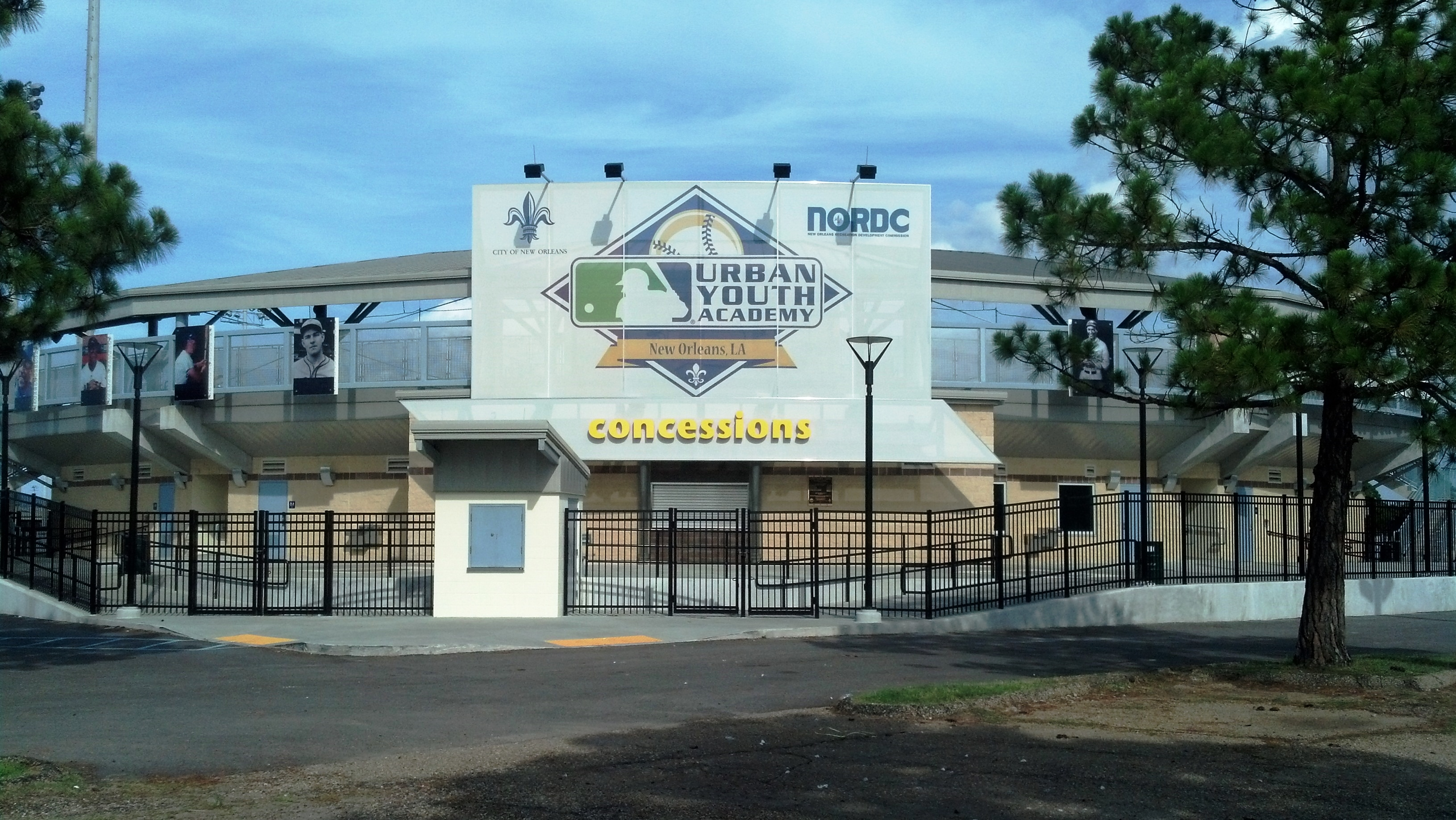
Wesley Barrow Stadium, New Orleans

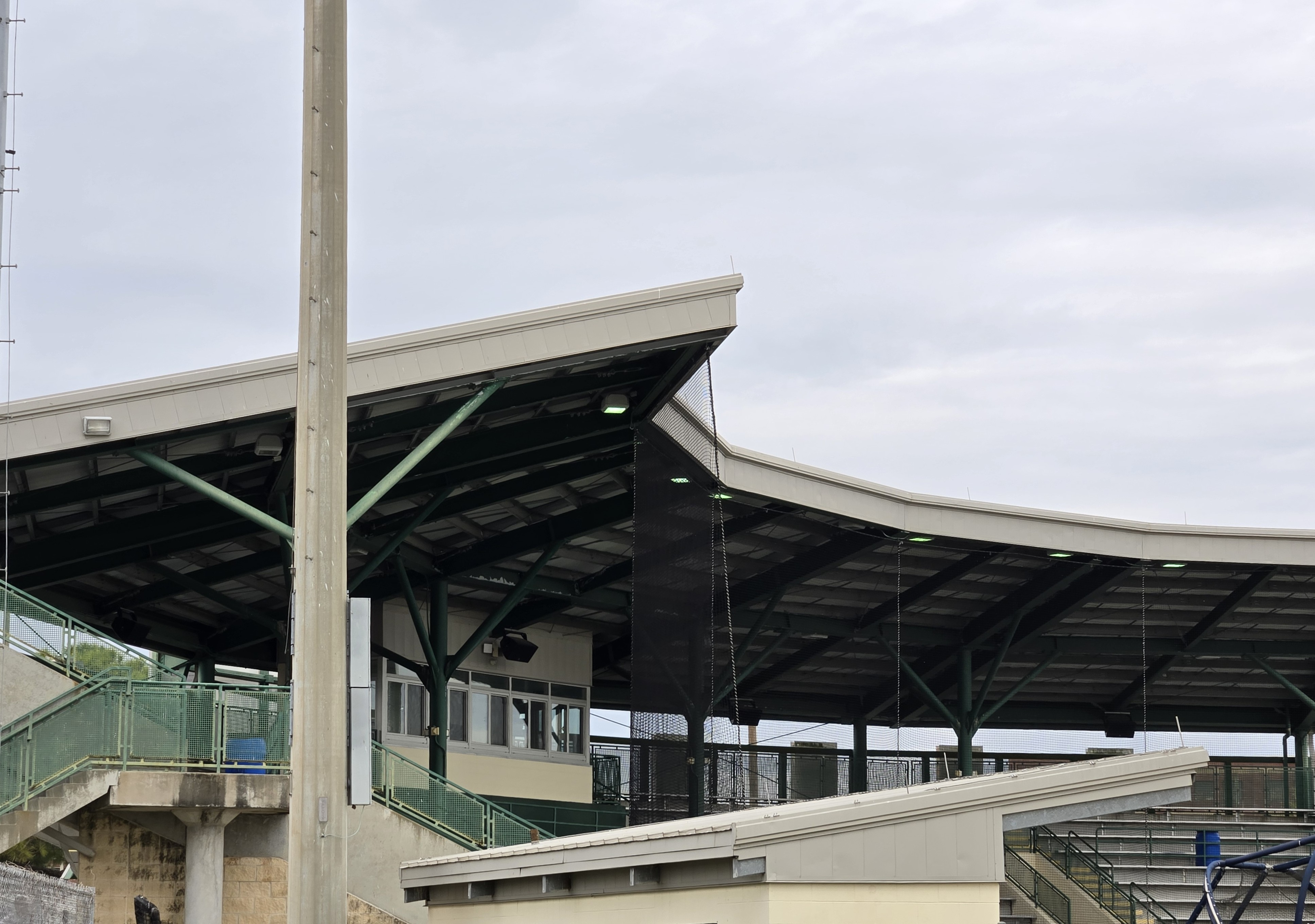
Wesley Barrow Stadium Grandstand, New Orleans

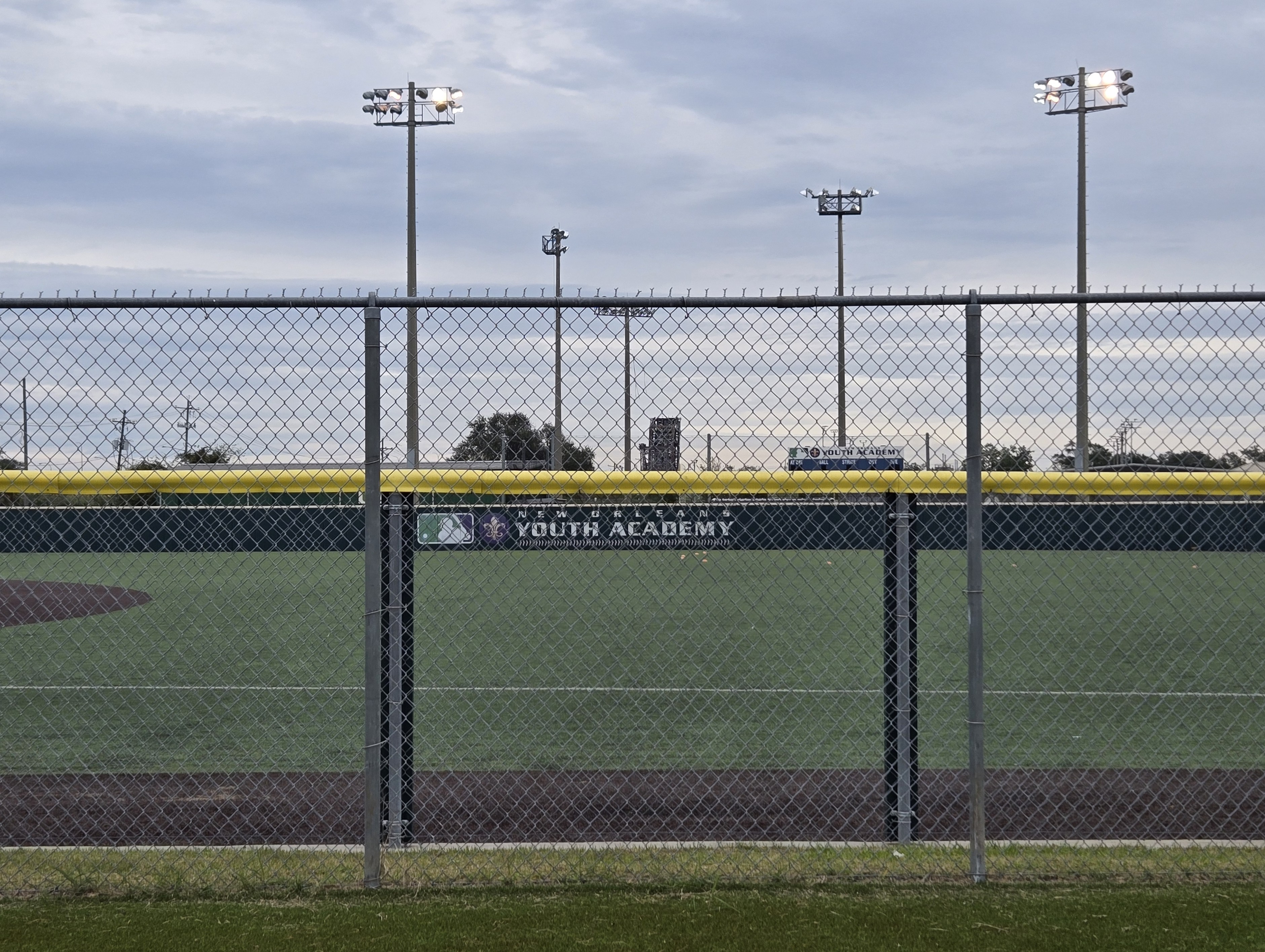
Wesley Barrow Stadium, New Orleans, MLB Youth Academy Signage

== See also ==
- Major League Baseball Urban Youth Academy
- Reviving Baseball in Inner Cities
