= 2022 Northwestern State Demons baseball team =

American college baseball season

2022 Northwestern State Demons baseball
- Conference: Southland Conference
- Record: 25–29 (12–12 Southland)
- Head coach: Bobby Barbier (6th season)
- Assistant coaches: Chris Bertrand; Spencer Goodwin
- Home stadium: H. Alvin Brown–C. C. Stroud Field

2022 Southland Conference baseball standings
	Conf.				Overall
Team	W		L	PCT	W		L	PCT
McNeese State ‍†‍‍	15	–	9	.625	34	–	23	.596
Southeastern Louisiana ‍‍‡‍^{y}	14	–	10	.583	30	–	29	.508
New Orleans ‍‍‍	13	–	11	.542	30	–	23	.566
Nicholls ‍‍‍	12	–	12	.500	26	–	25	.510
Northwestern State ‍‍‍	12	–	12	.500	25	–	29	.463
Houston Baptist ‍‍‍	11	–	13	.458	18	–	36	.333
Texas A&M–Corpus Christi ‍‍‍	10	–	14	.417	27	–	28	.491
Incarnate Word ‍‍‍	9	–	15	.375	21	–	31	.404
† – Conference champion ‡ – Tournament champion y – Invited to the NCAA tournament Rankings from D1Baseball

The 2022 Northwestern State Demons baseball team represented Northwestern State University during the 2022 NCAA Division I baseball season. The Demons played their home games at H. Alvin Brown–C. C. Stroud Field and were led by sixth–year head coach Bobby Barbier. They were members of the Southland Conference.

== Preseason ==
=== Southland Conference Coaches Poll ===
The Southland Conference Coaches Poll was released on February 11, 2022, and the Demons were picked to finish fifth in the conference with 55 votes and two first place votes.

Coaches poll
Predicted finish	Team	Votes (1st place)
1	Southeastern Louisiana	93 (10)
2	McNeese State	80 (3)
3	New Orleans	73
4	Texas A&M–Corpus Christi	63 (1)
5	Northwestern State	55 (2)
6	Incarnate Word	36
T–7	Houston Baptist	24
T–7	Nicholls	24

=== Preseason All-Southland Team ===
The following players were named to the 2022 Preseason All-Southland Team, voted on by the league's coaches.

1st Team

- Daunte Stuart – Second Baseman
- Cal Carver – Starting Pitcher

2nd Team

- Donovan Ohnoutka – Starting Pitcher
- Drayton Brown – Relief Pitcher

== Personnel ==
2022 Northwestern State Demons baseball team
Players
Coaches

#	Pos.	Name	B/T	Height	Weight	Year	Home town
1	OF	Larson Fontenot	R/R	6 ft 2 in (1.88 m)	210 lb (95 kg)	Sr	St. Amant, Louisiana
2	RHP	Ethan Francis	L/R	5 ft 10 in (1.78 m)	175 lb (79 kg)	Jr	Miscouche, Canada
3	INF	Bryce Holmes	R/L	6 ft 0 in (1.83 m)	205 lb (93 kg)	Sr	Livingston, Texas
4	OF	Kendall Foster	L/L	5 ft 8 in (1.73 m)	170 lb (77 kg)	Jr	Prosper, Texas
5	INF	Jake Haze	R/R	5 ft 9 in (1.75 m)	165 lb (75 kg)	So	Highlands Ranch, Colorado
6	INF	Cam Sibley	L/R	6 ft 0 in (1.83 m)	170 lb (77 kg)	Sr	Baton Rouge, Louisiana
8	RHP	Grayson Gates	L/R	6 ft 2 in (1.88 m)	185 lb (84 kg)	Fr	Benton, Louisiana
9	C	Bailyn Sorensen	R/R	6 ft 2 in (1.88 m)	210 lb (95 kg)	Fr	Rayville, Louisiana
11	C	Austin Kirkpatrick	R/R	6 ft 1 in (1.85 m)	180 lb (82 kg)	Sr	Parks, Louisiana
12	OF	Cole Horton	L/R	5 ft 9 in (1.75 m)	190 lb (86 kg)	So	Bossier City, Louisiana
13	OF	Broch Holmes	L/R	5 ft 8 in (1.73 m)	195 lb (88 kg)	So	Livingston, Texas
14	OF	Gabe Colaianni	L/L	5 ft 10 in (1.78 m)	190 lb (86 kg)	So	Missouri City, Texas
15	INF	Cameron Parikh	R/R	6 ft 2 in (1.88 m)	200 lb (91 kg)	Jr	Bossier City, Louisiana
16	RHP	Alex Makarewich	R/R	6 ft 0 in (1.83 m)	185 lb (84 kg)	So	Keller, Texas
18	LHP	Cal Carver	L/L	6 ft 3 in (1.91 m)	190 lb (86 kg)	Jr	San Antonio, Texas
19	INF	Daunte Stuart	R/R	5 ft 11 in (1.8 m)	180 lb (82 kg)	So	The Woodlands, Texas
20	OF	Jardy Montgomery	R/R	6 ft 2 in (1.88 m)	180 lb (82 kg)	Fr	New Orleans, Louisiana
21	OF	Jacob Farrell	R/R	6 ft 1 in (1.85 m)	200 lb (91 kg)	So	Cypress, Texas
22	RHP	Ryan Olchoway	R/R	6 ft 3 in (1.91 m)	180 lb (82 kg)	So	Saskatoon, Canada
23	INF	Hayden Knotts	R/R	6 ft 1 in (1.85 m)	188 lb (85 kg)	Fr	Bossier City, Louisiana
24	RHP	Josh Banes	R/R	5 ft 10 in (1.78 m)	185 lb (84 kg)	Sr	Learned, Mississippi
25	C	Bo Willis	R/R	6 ft 1 in (1.85 m)	210 lb (95 kg)	So	Magnolia, Texas
26	RHP	Donovan Ohnoutka	R/R	6 ft 1 in (1.85 m)	200 lb (91 kg)	Sr	Natchitoches, Louisiana
27	RHP	Chase Prestwich	R/R	5 ft 11 in (1.8 m)	200 lb (91 kg)	Fr	Frederick, Colorado
31	C	James Starnes	L/R	5 ft 11 in (1.8 m)	190 lb (86 kg)	So	Spring, Texas
32	INF	Gray Rowlett	R/R	6 ft 5 in (1.96 m)	215 lb (98 kg)	Fr	Keller, Texas
33	INF	Miguel Vega	R/R	6 ft 3 in (1.91 m)	230 lb (104 kg)	So	Tyler, Texas
34	RHP	Drayton Brown	R/R	6 ft 3 in (1.91 m)	215 lb (98 kg)	So	Nacogdoches, Texas
35	INF	AJ Bailey	R/R	5 ft 10 in (1.78 m)	200 lb (91 kg)	Fr	Zachary, Louisiana
37	LHP	Will Hine	R/L	6 ft 4 in (1.93 m)	215 lb (98 kg)	Sr	Benton, Louisiana
39	LHP	Cameron Taylor	L/L	5 ft 11 in (1.8 m)	195 lb (88 kg)	Sr	Bossier City, Louisiana
40	RHP	Gus Collins	R/R	6 ft 4 in (1.93 m)	224 lb (102 kg)	So	Pryor, Oklahoma
41	RHP	Andrew Cossio	R/R	6 ft 0 in (1.83 m)	187 lb (85 kg)	Jr	Spring, Texas
42	RHP	Thomas Sotile	L/R	6 ft 3 in (1.91 m)	180 lb (82 kg)	So	Baton Rouge, Louisiana
45	RHP	Dawson Flowers	R/R	6 ft 4 in (1.93 m)	210 lb (95 kg)	So	Brookhaven, Mississippi
46	RHP	Johnathan Harmon	R/R	6 ft 5 in (1.96 m)	195 lb (88 kg)	So	Hornbeck, Louisiana
48	OF	Reese Lipoma	R/R	5 ft 10 in (1.78 m)	175 lb (79 kg)	Fr	Gonzales, Louisiana
54	OF	Jeffrey Elkins	R/R	5 ft 10 in (1.78 m)	195 lb (88 kg)	Jr	Lafayette, Louisiana
	INF	Darnell Bayonne	R/R	6 ft 0 in (1.83 m)	160 lb (73 kg)	Fr	Pineville, Louisiana
	LHP	Mason Langdon	R/L	6 ft 0 in (1.83 m)	192 lb (87 kg)	Fr	Shreveport, Louisiana

Head coach

Bobby Barbier (Northwestern State)

Assistant coach(es)

Chris Bertrand (LSU–Shreveport)
Spencer Goodwin (Northwestern State)
Dan Hlad (Northwestern State)

Legend

- (C) Team captain
- (S) Suspended
- (I) Ineligible
- Injured
- Current redshirt

Roster
Last update: 14 April 2022

== Schedule and results ==
Legend
	Northwestern State win
	Northwestern State loss
	Postponement/Cancelation/Suspensions
**Bold**	Northwestern State team member

2022 Northwestern State Demons baseball game log
Regular season (25–27)

February (3–3)
Date	Opponent	Rank	Site/stadium	Score	Win	Loss	Save	TV	Attendance	Overall record	SLC Record
Feb. 18	Stephen F. Austin		H. Alvin Brown–C. C. Stroud Field • Natchitoches, LA	**L** 3–7	Richter (1-0)	**Carver** (0-1)	None		775	0–1	
Feb. 19	Stephen F. Austin		H. Alvin Brown–C. C. Stroud Field • Natchitoches, LA	**W** 6–2	**Harmon** (1-0)	Mangus (0-1)	None		602	1–1	
Feb. 20	Stephen F. Austin		H. Alvin Brown–C. C. Stroud Field • Natchitoches, LA	**W** 5–4	**Ohnoutka** (1-0)	Poell (0-1)	None		218	2–1	
Feb. 25	vs. Oklahoma		Globe Life Field • Arlington, TX	**W** 4–2	**Taylor** (1-0)	Atwood (1-1)	**Caossio** (1)			3–1	
Feb. 26	vs. Oklahoma		Globe Life Field • Arlington, TX	**L** 1–2	Sandlin (1-1)	**Prestwich** (0-1)	Michael (2)		5,974	3–2	
Feb. 27	vs. Oklahoma		Globe Life Field • Arlington, TX	**L** 1–5	Martinez (1-0)	**Brown** (0-1)	None		4,895	3–3	

March (9–9)
Date	Opponent	Rank	Site/stadium	Score	Win	Loss	Save	TV	Attendance	Overall record	SLC Record
Mar. 1	Louisiana		H. Alvin Brown–C. C. Stroud Field • Natchitoches, LA	**L** 8–11	Shifflet (1-0)	**Prestwich** (0-2)	Schultz (1)		580	3–4	
Mar. 2	at Louisiana		M. L. Tigue Moore Field at Russo Park • Lafayette, LA	**L** 3–6	Havard (1-1)	**Ohnoutka** (1-1)	Schultz (2)		4,072	3–5	
Mar. 4	vs. Nebraska		Clay Gould Ballpark • Arlington, TX	**L** 0–2	Frank (1-0)	**Carver** (0-2)	Olson (1)		200	3–6	
Mar. 5	vs. Nebraska		Clay Gould Ballpark • Arlington, TX	**L** 0–6	Schanaman (1-2)	**Harmon** (1-1)	None		311	3–7	
Mar. 6	at UT Arlington		Clay Gould Ballpark • Arlington, TX	**L** 0–1	Bailey (2-0)	**Brown** (0-2)	King (1)		420	3–8	
Mar. 9	at Louisiana–Monroe		Warhawk Field • Monroe, LA	**L** 2–6	Cressend (1-1)	**Ohnoutka** (1-2)	None		972	3–9	
Mar. 12	Alcorn State		H. Alvin Brown–C. C. Stroud Field • Natchitoches, LA	**W** 20–3^{7}	**Carver** (1-2)	Meadows (0-3)	None			4–9	
Mar. 12	Alcorn State		H. Alvin Brown–C. C. Stroud Field • Natchitoches, LA	**W** 19–1^{7}	**Harmon** (2-1)	Puckett (0-2)	None		510	5–9	
Mar. 13	Alcorn State		H. Alvin Brown–C. C. Stroud Field • Natchitoches, LA	**W** 16–1^{7}	**Brown** (1-2)	Ford (0-3)	None		457	6–9	
Mar. 15	Lamar		H. Alvin Brown–C. C. Stroud Field • Natchitoches, LA	**W** 21–7	**Taylor** (2-0)	Ellis (0-1)	None		487	7–9	
Mar. 17	South Dakota State		H. Alvin Brown–C. C. Stroud Field • Natchitoches, LA	**L** 2–16	Bishop (1-2)	**Ohnoutka** (1-3)	Arbogast (1)		382	7–10	
Mar. 18	South Dakota State		H. Alvin Brown–C. C. Stroud Field • Natchitoches, LA	**W** 6–2	**Carver** (2-2)	Bourassa (0-2)	**Flowers** (1)		502	8–10	
Mar. 19	South Dakota State		H. Alvin Brown–C. C. Stroud Field • Natchitoches, LA	**L** 2–4^{7}	Carlson (3-2)	**Harmon** (2-2)	Barnett (3)		498	8–11	
Mar. 19	South Dakota State		H. Alvin Brown–C. C. Stroud Field • Natchitoches, LA	**W** 13–9^{7}	**Brown** (2-2)	Beazley (0-2)	**Banes** (1)		498	9–11	
Mar. 23	Grambling State		H. Alvin Brown–C. C. Stroud Field • Natchitoches, LA	**W** 6–3	**Cossio** (1-0)	Mims III (0-1)	**Banes** (2)		400	10–11	
Mar. 25	at New Orleans		Maestri Field at Privateer Park • New Orleans, LA	**L** 6–7	Williams (4-0)	**Flowers** (0-1)	None	ESPN+	623	10–12	0–1
Mar. 26	at New Orleans		Maestri Field at Privateer Park • New Orleans, LA	**W** 2–1	**Harmon** (3-2)	Mitchell (0-3)	None	ESPN+	415	11–12	1–1
Mar. 27	at New Orleans		Maestri Field at Privateer Park • New Orleans, LA	**W** 16–10	**Brown** (3-2)	Lamkin (0-1)	None		454	12–12	2–1

April (8–10)
Date	Opponent	Rank	Site/stadium	Score	Win	Loss	Save	TV	Attendance	Overall record	SLC Record
Apr. 1	Texas A&M–Corpus Christi		H. Alvin Brown–C. C. Stroud Field • Natchitoches, LA	**W** 8–2	**Carver** (3-2)	Garcia (2-2)	None		519	13–12	3–1
Apr. 2	Texas A&M–Corpus Christi		H. Alvin Brown–C. C. Stroud Field • Natchitoches, LA	**W** 11–8	**Harmon** (4-2)	Thomas (4-2)	**Flowers** (2)		555	14–12	4–1
Apr. 3	Texas A&M–Corpus Christi		H. Alvin Brown–C. C. Stroud Field • Natchitoches, LA	**W** 1–0^{10}	**Collins** (1-0)	Perez (2-3)	None		576	15–12	5–1
Apr. 6	at Lamar		Vincent–Beck Stadium • Beaumont, TX	**L** 6–9	Morse (2-1)	**Francis** (0-1)	None		988	15–13	
Apr. 8	at Incarnate Word		Sullivan Field • San Antonio, TX	**L** 2–8	Rollins (2-0)	**Carver** (3-3)	None		195	15–14	5–2
Apr. 9	at Incarnate Word		Sullivan Field • San Antonio, TX	**L** 2–6	Garza (3-3)	**Harmon** (4-3)	Hayward (1)		190	15–15	5–3
Apr. 10	at Incarnate Word		Sullivan Field • San Antonio, TX	**L** 4–11	David (2-0)	**Brown** (3-3)	None		233	15–16	5–4
Apr. 14	at Nicholls		Ben Meyer Diamond at Ray E. Didier Field • Thibodaux, LA	**L** 2–8	Desandro (2-2)	**Carver** (3-4)	Gearing (1)		511	15–17	5–5
Apr. 15	at Nicholls		Ben Meyer Diamond at Ray E. Didier Field • Thibodaux, LA	**L** 0–6	Theriot (5-2)	**Harmon** (4-4)	None		215	15–18	5–6
Apr. 16	at Nicholls		Ben Meyer Diamond at Ray E. Didier Field • Thibodaux, LA	**W** 10–7	**Brown** (4-3)	Heckman (1-3)	None		287	16–18	6–6
Apr. 19	LSU–Alexandria		H. Alvin Brown–C. C. Stroud Field • Natchitoches, LA	**W** 11–4	**Collins** (2-0)	Klieb (0-1)	None		385	17–18	
Apr. 20	at Louisiana Tech		J. C. Love Field at Pat Patterson Park • Ruston, LA	**L** 4–6	Whorff (4-5)	**Prestwich** (0-3)	Crigger (7)		2,499	17–19	
Apr. 22	Houston Baptist		H. Alvin Brown–C. C. Stroud Field • Natchitoches, LA	**W** 4–3	**Collins** (3-0)	Smitherman (1-1)	None		461	18–19	7–6
Apr. 23	Houston Baptist		H. Alvin Brown–C. C. Stroud Field • Natchitoches, LA	**W** 4–2	**Harmon** (5-4)	Burch (1-3)	None		475	19–19	8–6
Apr. 24	Houston Baptist		H. Alvin Brown–C. C. Stroud Field • Natchitoches, LA	**L** 1–10	Charles (3-0)	**Brown** (4-4)	None		502	19–20	8–7
Apr. 26	at Grambling State		Ralph Waldo Emerson Jones Park and Wilbert Ellis Field • Grambling, LA	**W** 8–3	**Prestwich** (1-3)	Rudy (3-6)	None		121	20–20	
Apr. 27	at LSU–Alexandria		Generals Baseball Field • Alexandria, LA	Game cancelled							
Apr. 29	Southeastern Louisiana		H. Alvin Brown–C. C. Stroud Field • Natchitoches, LA	**L** 4–6	Robb (3-3)	**Flowers** (0-2)	Trahan (6)		510	20–21	8–8
Apr. 30	Southeastern Louisiana		H. Alvin Brown–C. C. Stroud Field • Natchitoches, LA	**L** 2–4	Guth (2-1)	**Harmon** (5-5)	Trahan (7)		522	20–22	8–9

May (5–5)
Date	Opponent	Rank	Site/stadium	Score	Win	Loss	Save	TV	Attendance	Overall record	SLC Record
May 1	Southeastern Louisiana		H. Alvin Brown–C. C. Stroud Field • Natchitoches, LA	**W** 5–2	**Brown** (5-4)	Landry (2-5)	None		525	21–22	9–9
May 4	Louisiana Tech		H. Alvin Brown–C. C. Stroud Field • Natchitoches, LA	**L** 3–4	Knight (1-0)	**Taylor** (2-1)	Crigger (10)		1,208	21–23	
May 6	at McNeese State		Joe Miller Ballpark • Lake Charles, LA	**W** 16–12	**Carver** (4-4)	Rogers (5-4)	None		750	22–23	10–9
May 7	at McNeese State		Joe Miller Ballpark • Lake Charles, LA	**W** 5–4^{10}	**Cossio** (2-0)	Foster (3-2)	**Ohnoutka** (1)		777	23–23	11–9
May 8	at McNeese State		Joe Miller Ballpark • Lake Charles, LA	**L** 4–10	Zeppuhar (1-0)	**Brown** (5-5)	None		763	23–24	11–10
May 10	Louisiana–Monroe		H. Alvin Brown–C. C. Stroud Field • Natchitoches, LA	**W** 10–5	**Francis** (1-1)	Brady (0-1)	None		414	24–24	
May 13	New Orleans		H. Alvin Brown–C. C. Stroud Field • Natchitoches, LA	**L** 4–6	Williams (6-1)	**Collins** (3-1)	None		519	24–25	11–11
May 14	New Orleans		H. Alvin Brown–C. C. Stroud Field • Natchitoches, LA	**W** 14–11	**Taylor** (3-1)	Porter (1-2)	**Francis** (1)		530	25–25	12–11
May 15	New Orleans		H. Alvin Brown–C. C. Stroud Field • Natchitoches, LA	**L** 4–11	Khachadourian (5-2)	**Brown** (5-6)	Seroski (3)		602	25–26	12–12
May 17	at LSU		Alex Box Stadium, Skip Bertman Field • Baton Rouge, LA	**L** 7–19^{7}	Gervase (3-1)	**Flowers** (0-3)	None	SECN+	10,423	25–27	

Postseason (0–2)

Southland Tournament (0–2)
Date	Opponent	(Seed)/Rank	Site/stadium	Score	Win	Loss	Save	TV	Attendance	Overall record	Tournament record
May 19	vs. (4) Nicholls	(5)	Joe Miller Ballpark • Lake Charles, LA	**L** 6–7	Gearing (5-3)	**Carver** (4-5)	None	ESPN+	348	25–28	0–1
May 20	vs. (8) Incarnate Word	(5)	Joe Miller Ballpark • Lake Charles, LA	**L** 10–14	Mikulik (1-1)	**Harmon** (5-6)	None	ESPN+	346	25–29	0–2

Schedule source:

*Rankings are based on the team's current ranking in the D1Baseball poll.
