= Bobby Barbier =

American baseball player and coach

Current position
- Title: Head coach
- Team: Southeastern Louisiana
- Conference: Southland
- Record: 102–65

Biographical details
- Born: c. 1984 (age 41–42); Lafayette, Louisiana, U.S.
- Education: Northwestern State University

Playing career
- 2003–2006: Northwestern State
- Position: First baseman

Coaching career (HC unless noted)
- 2007–2009: Northwestern State (assistant)
- 2010–2014: Alabama (assistant)
- 2015–2016: Northwestern State (assistant)
- 2017–2023: Northwestern State
- 2024–present: Southeastern Louisiana

Head coaching record
- Overall: 283–234
- Tournaments: NCAA: 1–2

Accomplishments and honors

Championships
- Southland Conference Tournament (2018); 2x Southland Conference regular season (2025, 2026)

Awards
- 3× Southland Conference Coach of the Year (2018, 2025, 2026)

Robert Barbier (born 1984) is an American college baseball coach, currently serving as head coach of the Southeastern Louisiana University team. He is the son of Darren Barbier, former head coach of the Nicholls State football team. He was named the 2018 Southland Conference Coach of the Year.

== Head coaching record ==
Record table
Season	Team	Overall	Conference	Standing	Postseason
Northwestern State Demons (Southland Conference) (2017–2023)
2017	Northwestern State	20–34	10–20	11th	
2018	Northwestern State	38–24	18–12	3rd	NCAA Regional
2019	Northwestern State	30–25	15–15	7th	Southland tournament
2020	Northwestern State	12–4	2–1		Season canceled due to COVID-19
2021	Northwestern State	27–26	20–16	6th	Southland tournament
2022	Northwestern State	25–29	12–12	T-4th	Southland tournament
2023	Northwestern State	29–27	12–12	T-5th	Southland tournament
Northwestern State:		181–169	89–88		
Southeastern Louisiana Lions (Southland Conference) (2024–present)
2024	Southeastern Louisiana	30–28	10–14	T–6th	Southland tournament
2025	Southeastern Louisiana	38–16	22–8	T–1st	Southland tournament
2026	Southeastern Louisiana	34–21	19–9	1st	Southland tournament
Southeastern Louisiana:		102–65	51–31		
Total:		283–234			
National champion Postseason invitational champion Conference regular season champion Conference regular season and conference tournament champion Division regular season champion Division regular season and conference tournament champion Conference tournament champion

== See also ==
- List of current NCAA Division I baseball coaches
