= 2022 McNeese State Cowboys baseball team =

American college baseball season

2022 McNeese State Cowboys baseball

Southland Conference Regular season champion
- Conference: Southland Conference
- Record: 34–23 (15–9 Southland)
- Head coach: Justin Hill (9th season)
- Assistant coaches: Nick Zaleski; Jim Ricklefsen
- Home stadium: Joe Miller Ballpark

2022 Southland Conference baseball standings
	Conf.				Overall
Team	W		L	PCT	W		L	PCT
McNeese State ‍†‍‍	15	–	9	.625	34	–	23	.596
Southeastern Louisiana ‍‍‡‍^{y}	14	–	10	.583	30	–	29	.508
New Orleans ‍‍‍	13	–	11	.542	30	–	23	.566
Nicholls ‍‍‍	12	–	12	.500	26	–	25	.510
Northwestern State ‍‍‍	12	–	12	.500	25	–	29	.463
Houston Baptist ‍‍‍	11	–	13	.458	18	–	36	.333
Texas A&M–Corpus Christi ‍‍‍	10	–	14	.417	27	–	28	.491
Incarnate Word ‍‍‍	9	–	15	.375	21	–	31	.404
† – Conference champion ‡ – Tournament champion y – Invited to the NCAA tournament Rankings from D1Baseball

The 2022 McNeese State Cowboys baseball team represented McNeese State University during the 2022 NCAA Division I baseball season. The Cowboys played their home games at Joe Miller Ballpark and were led by ninth–year head coach Justin Hill. They were members of the Southland Conference.

== Preseason ==
=== Southland Conference Coaches Poll ===
The Southland Conference Coaches Poll was released on February 10, 2022 and the Cowboys were picked to finish second in the conference with 80 votes and three first place votes.

Coaches poll
Predicted finish	Team	Votes (1st place)
1	Southeastern Louisiana	93 (10)
2	McNeese State	80 (3)
3	New Orleans	73
4	Texas A&M–Corpus Christi	63 (1)
5	Northwestern State	55 (2)
6	Incarnate Word	36
T7	Houston Baptist	24
T7	Nicholls	24

=== Preseason All-Southland Team & Honors ===
==== First Team ====
- Tre Obregon III – Designated Hitter
- Payton Harden – Outfielder

==== Second Team ====
- Julian Gonzales – Outfielder

== Personnel ==
2022 McNeese State Cowboys baseball team
Players
Coaches

#	Pos.	Name	B/T	Height	Weight	Year	Home town
0		Braden Duhon (redshirt)	L/R	5 ft 10 in (1.78 m)	170 lb (77 kg)	So	Moss Bluff, Louisiana
1	OF	Payton Harden (redshirt)	L/L	5 ft 8 in (1.73 m)	160 lb (73 kg)	Jr	Atascocita, Texas
2	OF	Cooper Hext	L/L	6 ft 1 in (1.85 m)	175 lb (79 kg)	So	DeQuincy, Louisiana
3	INF	Antonio Gauthier (redshirt)	L/R	5 ft 8 in (1.73 m)	175 lb (79 kg)	Jr	Lake Charles, Louisiana
4	INF	Brad Burckel (redshirt)	L/R	5 ft 8 in (1.73 m)	175 lb (79 kg)	Jr	Lindale, Texas
6	C	Tre' Obregon III (redshirt)	R/R	5 ft 10 in (1.78 m)	195 lb (88 kg)	Sr	Sallisaw, Oklahoma
8	INF	Kade Morris (redshirt)	R/R	6 ft 2 in (1.88 m)	200 lb (91 kg)	Sr	Alvin, Texas
11	INF	Reid Bourque (redshirt)	L/R	6 ft 1 in (1.85 m)	180 lb (82 kg)	Sr	Moss Bluff, Louisiana
12	C	Schuyler Thibodaux (redshirt)	R/R	6 ft 0 in (1.83 m)	180 lb (82 kg)	Jr	Bridge City, Texas
13	RHP	Christian Vega (redshirt)	R/R	6 ft 1 in (1.85 m)	190 lb (86 kg)	Jr	Katy, Texas
14	RHP	Brett Payne (redshirt)	R/R	6 ft 2 in (1.88 m)	190 lb (86 kg)	So	Lumberton, Texas
16	INF	Josh Leslie (redshirt)	R/R	6 ft 0 in (1.83 m)	190 lb (86 kg)	Jr	Kenosha, Wisconsin
17	RHP	Sean-Michael Brady (redshirt)	R/R	6 ft 0 in (1.83 m)	205 lb (93 kg)	So	Lafayette, Louisiana
18	RHP	Isaac Duplechain (redshirt)	R/R	5 ft 10 in (1.78 m)	165 lb (75 kg)	So	Lake Charles, Louisiana
19	INF	Shane Martin	R/R	6 ft 2 in (1.88 m)	200 lb (91 kg)	Fr	Houston, Texas
20	RHP	Daniel Hecker (redshirt)	R/R	6 ft 0 in (1.83 m)	185 lb (84 kg)	Sr	Seabrook, Texas
21	OF	Conner Westenburg	R/R	6 ft 0 in (1.83 m)	170 lb (77 kg)	Fr	Porter, Texas
22	C	Andruw Gonzales (redshirt)	R/R	5 ft 11 in (1.8 m)	195 lb (88 kg)	So	Elgin, Texas
24		Peyton Johnson (redshirt)	L/R	6 ft 1 in (1.85 m)	200 lb (91 kg)	Jr	Moss Bluff, Louisiana
25	RHP	Ty Abraham (redshirt)	R/R	6 ft 3 in (1.91 m)	225 lb (102 kg)	So	Sugar Land, Texas
26	INF	Jordan Yeatts (redshirt)	R/R	5 ft 10 in (1.78 m)	165 lb (75 kg)	Jr	College Station, Texas
27	OF	Julian Gonzales (redshirt)	L/L	5 ft 10 in (1.78 m)	180 lb (82 kg)	Sr	Sulphur, Louisiana
28	C	Kade Hunter (redshirt)	R/R	6 ft 1 in (1.85 m)	220 lb (100 kg)	So	Comfort, Texas
31	LHP	Zane Zeppuhar (redshirt)	L/L	5 ft 10 in (1.78 m)	190 lb (86 kg)	Jr	St. Amant, Louisiana
32	RHP	Trenton Chenard	R/R	6 ft 3 in (1.91 m)	170 lb (77 kg)	Fr	Weimer, Texas
33	RHP	Bryson Hudgens (redshirt)	R/R	6 ft 4 in (1.93 m)	245 lb (111 kg)	Jr	Argyle, Texas
34	RHP	Burrell Jones (redshirt)	R/R	6 ft 5 in (1.96 m)	225 lb (102 kg)	Jr	Holt, Michigan
35	RHP	Andrew Sheridan (redshirt)	R/R	5 ft 10 in (1.78 m)	195 lb (88 kg)	Sr	Sulphur, Louisiana
37	RHP	Zach Diaz (redshirt)	R/R	6 ft 2 in (1.88 m)	205 lb (93 kg)	Sr	Tomball, Texas
38	RHP	Brian Shadrick (redshirt)	R/R	6 ft 3 in (1.91 m)	175 lb (79 kg)	So	Belton, Texas
39	INF	Nate Collins (redshirt)	R/R	6 ft 1 in (1.85 m)	190 lb (86 kg)	Sr	Alvin, Texas
40	RHP	Grant Rogers (redshirt)	R/R	6 ft 7 in (2.01 m)	210 lb (95 kg)	So	Groves, Texas
41	RHP	Hayden Shaddox (redshirt)	R/R	6 ft 4 in (1.93 m)	205 lb (93 kg)	Jr	Athens, Texas
44	RHP	Chance Stone (redshirt)	R/R	5 ft 11 in (1.8 m)	200 lb (91 kg)	So	Sulphur, Louisiana
45	RHP	JT Peloquin (redshirt)	R/R	5 ft 9 in (1.75 m)	185 lb (84 kg)	So	Lake Charles, Louisiana
46	RHP	Tyler Stone (redshirt)	R/R	5 ft 10 in (1.78 m)	185 lb (84 kg)	Sr	Rockwall, Texas
47	INF	Kade McBride	R/R	5 ft 8 in (1.73 m)	155 lb (70 kg)	Fr	Sulphur, Louisiana
48	C	Ben David	R/R	5 ft 11 in (1.8 m)	190 lb (86 kg)	So	Lake Charles, Louisiana
49	RHP	Davis Burgin (redshirt)	R/R	6 ft 1 in (1.85 m)	215 lb (98 kg)	Jr	Trussville, Alabama
50	RHP	Cameron Lejeune	R/R	6 ft 3 in (1.91 m)	210 lb (95 kg)	So	Sulphur, Louisiana
99	RHP	Cameron Foster (redshirt)	R/R	6 ft 5 in (1.96 m)	230 lb (104 kg)	Sr	Houston, Texas

Head coach

Justin Hill (Northwestern State)

Assistant coach(es)

Nick Zaleski (Alabama)
Jimmy Ricklefsen (McNeese State)
Peyton McLemore (McNeese State)

Legend

- (C) Team captain
- (S) Suspended
- (I) Ineligible
- Injured
- Current redshirt

Roster
Last update: 11 April 2022

== Schedule and results ==
Legend
	McNeese State win
	McNeese State loss
	Postponement/Cancelation/Suspensions
**Bold**	McNeese State team member

2022 McNeese State Cowboys baseball game log
Regular season (30–21)

February (6–2)
Date	Opponent	Rank	Site/stadium	Score	Win	Loss	Save	TV	Attendance	Overall record	SLC Record
Feb. 18	Stony Brook		Joe Miller Ballpark • Lake Charles, LA	**W** 6–4	**Vega** (1-0)	Sharkey (0-1)	**Foster** (1)		621	1–0	
Feb. 19	Stony Brook		Joe Miller Ballpark • Lake Charles, LA	**L** 3–7	Book (1-0)	**Abraham** (0-1)	None		725	1–1	
Feb. 20	Stony Brook		Joe Miller Ballpark • Lake Charles, LA	**W** 4–1	**Rogers** (1-0)	Helmstadt (0-1)	**Foster** (2)		587	2–1	
Feb. 22	Houston		Joe Miller Ballpark • Lake Charles, LA	**L** 2–3	Sears (1-0)	**Burgin** (0-1)	Medrano (1)		475	2–2	
Feb. 25	Alcorn State		Joe Miller Ballpark • Lake Charles, LA	**W** 13–0^{7}	**Stone** (1-0)	Meadows (0-1)	**Brady** (1)		400	3–2	
Feb. 26	Alcorn State		Joe Miller Ballpark • Lake Charles, LA	**W** 14–1^{(7 inns)}	**Abraham** (1-1)	Puckett (0-1)	None		417	4–2	
Feb. 26	Alcorn State		Joe Miller Ballpark • Lake Charles, LA	**W** 17–1^{7}	**Rogers** (2-0)	Ford (0-1)	None		401	5–2	
Feb. 27	Alcorn State		Joe Miller Ballpark • Lake Charles, LA	**W** 23–1^{7}	**Duplechain** (1-0)	Feltson (0-1)	None		486	6–2	

March (7–10)
Date	Opponent	Rank	Site/stadium	Score	Win	Loss	Save	TV	Attendance	Overall record	SLC Record
Mar. 1	at Southern		Lee–Hines Field • Baton Rouge, LA	**W** 7–3	**Jones** (1-0)	Paul (0-1)	**Foster** (3)		206	7–2	
Mar. 4	Louisiana Tech		Joe Miller Ballpark • Lake Charles, LA	**L** 5–21	Fincher (3-0)	**Stone** (1-1)	None		851	7–3	
Mar. 5	Louisiana Tech		Joe Miller Ballpark • Lake Charles, LA	**L** 3–11	Tomkins (1-0)	**Rogers** (2-1)	None		820	7–4	
Mar. 6	Louisiana Tech		Joe Miller Ballpark • Lake Charles, LA	**W** 5–2	**Shadrick** (1-0)	Whorff (0-2)	**Foster** (4)		770	8–4	
Mar. 9	at No. 12 LSU		Alex Box Stadium, Skip Bertman Field • Baton Rouge, LA	**L** 3–6	Hellmers (2-0)	**Vega** (1-1)	None	SECN+	9,907	8–5	
Mar. 11	Cal State Northridge		Joe Miller Ballpark • Lake Charles, LA	**L** 6–9	Sodersten (3-1)	**Stone** (1-2)	Gutierrez (1)		698	8–6	
Mar. 12	Cal State Northridge		Joe Miller Ballpark • Lake Charles, LA	**W** 4–3	**Foster** (1-0)	Schriever (0-1)	None		704	9–6	
Mar. 13	Cal State Northridge		Joe Miller Ballpark • Lake Charles, LA	**L** 4–6	Traxel (3-1)	**Abraham** (1-2)	Granados (1)		695	9–7	
Mar. 15	Columbia		Joe Miller Ballpark • Lake Charles, LA	**W** 7–2	**Stone** (2-2)	Yoo (0-1)	**Foster** (5)		703	10–7	
Mar. 16	Louisiana		Joe Miller Ballpark • Lake Charles, LA	**L** 8–10	Menard (1-0)	**Shadrick** (1-1)	Schultz (3)		1,476	10–8	
Mar. 18	Eastern Illinois		Joe Miller Ballpark • Lake Charles, LA	**L** 2–3	Nicholson (3-0)	**Rogers** (2-2)	Robbins (4)		623	10–9	
Mar. 19	Eastern Illinois		Joe Miller Ballpark • Lake Charles, LA	**W** 6–3	**Abraham** (2-2)	Doherty (2-2)	**Foster** (6)		600	11–9	
Mar. 20	Eastern Illinois		Joe Miller Ballpark • Lake Charles, LA	**L** 6–7	Wainscott (1-1)	**Brady** (0-1)	Robbins (5)		610	11–10	
Mar. 22	at Stephen F. Austin		Jaycees Field • Nacogdoches, TX	Game cancelled							
Mar. 25	Houston Baptist		Joe Miller Ballpark • Lake Charles, LA	**L** 4–6	Spinney (1-2)	**Sheridan** (0-1)	Reitmeyer (4)		764	11–11	0–1
Mar. 26	Houston Baptist		Joe Miller Ballpark • Lake Charles, LA	**L** 3–5	Burch (1-2)	**Abraham** (2-3)	Reitmeyer (5)		860	11–12	0–2
Mar. 27	Houston Baptist		Joe Miller Ballpark • Lake Charles, LA	**W** 13–7	**Brady** (1-1)	Spinney (1-3)	None		700	12–12	1–2
Mar. 30	Southern		Joe Miller Ballpark • Lake Charles, LA	**W** 9–7	**Brady** (2-1)	Dotson (0-1)	**Foster** (7)		650	13–12	

April (12–6)
Date	Opponent	Rank	Site/stadium	Score	Win	Loss	Save	TV	Attendance	Overall record	SLC Record
Apr. 1	at Nicholls		Ben Meyer Diamond at Ray E. Didier Field • Thibodaux, LA	**W** 2–0	**Rogers** (3-2)	Theriot (3-2)	**Foster** (8)		601	14–12	2–2
Apr. 2	at Nicholls		Ben Meyer Diamond at Ray E. Didier Field • Thibodaux, LA	**W** 5–1	**Vega** (2-1)	Gearing (3-2)	None		504	15–12	3–2
Apr. 3	at Nicholls		Ben Meyer Diamond at Ray E. Didier Field • Thibodaux, LA	**L** 7–8	Andrews (2-0)	**Foster** (1-1)	None		421	15–13	3–3
Apr. 6	Prairie View A&M		Joe Miller Ballpark • Lake Charles, LA	**W** 7–2	**Payne** (1-0)	Larzabal (1-3)	None		650	16–13	
Apr. 8	at New Orleans		Maestri Field at Privateer Park • New Orleans, LA	**L** 5–9	LeBlanc (5-0)	**Rogers** (3-3)	None	ESPN+	733	16–14	3–4
Apr. 9	at New Orleans		Maestri Field at Privateer Park • New Orleans, LA	**L** 2–11	Mitchell (1-3)	**Abraham** (2-4)	None	ESPN+	513	16–15	3–5
Apr. 10	at New Orleans		Maestri Field at Privateer Park • New Orleans, LA	**L** 9–11	Seroski (3-1)	**Vega** (2-2)	Paplham (1)	ESPN+	428	16–16	3–6
Apr. 12	at Louisiana		M. L. Tigue Moore Field at Russo Park • Lafayette, LA	Game cancelled							
Apr. 14	Incarnate Word		Joe Miller Ballpark • Lake Charles, LA	**W** 9–3	**Rogers** (4-3)	Rollins (2-1)	None		620	17–16	4–6
Apr. 15	Incarnate Word		Joe Miller Ballpark • Lake Charles, LA	**W** 4–3	**Foster** (2-1)	Hayward (1-3)	None		680	18–16	5–6
Apr. 16	Incarnate Word		Joe Miller Ballpark • Lake Charles, LA	**W** 11–1^{7}	**Jones** (2-0)	David (2-1)	None		750	19–16	6–6
Apr. 18	Sam Houston State		Joe Miller Ballpark • Lake Charles, LA	**W** 8–4	**Payne** (2-0)	Dillard (4-3)	**Foster** (9)		670	20—16	
Apr. 20	at Louisiana–Monroe		Warhawk Field • Monroe, LA	**L** 3–4	Judice (2-0)	**Vega** (2-3)	None		1,253	20–17	
Apr. 22	Southeastern Louisiana		Joe Miller Ballpark • Lake Charles, LA	**W** 7–3	**Foster** (3-1)	Trahan (2-2)	None		780	21–17	7–6
Apr. 23	Southeastern Louisiana		Joe Miller Ballpark • Lake Charles, LA	**W** 6–4	**Stone** (1-0)	Trahan (2-3)	None		830	22–17	8–6
Apr. 24	Southeastern Louisiana		Joe Miller Ballpark • Lake Charles, LA	**W** 8–4	**Payne** (3-0)	Landry (2-4)	**Foster** (10)		830	23–17	9–6
Apr. 26	Louisiana–Monroe		Joe Miller Ballpark • Lake Charles, LA	**L** 7–8	Shuffler (2-2)	**Payne** (3-1)	Orton (6)		870	23–18	
Apr. 29	at Texas A&M–Corpus Christi		Chapman Field • Corpus Christi, TX	**W** 7–2	**Rogers** (5-3)	Thomas (4-3)	None		297	24–18	10–6
Apr. 30	at Texas A&M–Corpus Christi		Chapman Field • Corpus Christi, TX`	**W** 7–3	**Stone** (3-2)	Purcell (1-3)	**Foster** (11)	ESPN+	297	25–18	11–6

May (5–3)
Date	Opponent	Rank	Site/stadium	Score	Win	Loss	Save	TV	Attendance	Overall record	SLC Record
May 1	at Texas A&M–Corpus Christi		Chapman Field • Corpus Christi, TX	**L** 11–13	Miller (2-1)	**Vega** (2-4)	Bird (1)	ESPN+	306	25–19	11–7
May 3	Stephen F. Austin		Joe Miller Ballpark • Lake Charles, LA	**W** 17–7^{8}	**Sheridan** (1-1)	Poell (2-3)	**Shadrick** (1)		650	26–19	
May 6	Northwestern State		Joe Miller Ballpark • Lake Charles, LA	**L** 12–16	Carver (4-4)	**Rogers** (5-4)	None		750	26–20	11–8
May 7	Northwestern State		Joe Miller Ballpark • Lake Charles, LA	**L** 4–5	Cossio (2-0)	**Foster** (3-2)	Ohnoutka (1)		777	26–21	11–9
May 8	Northwestern State		Joe Miller Ballpark • Lake Charles, LA	**W** 10–4	**Zeppuhar** (1-0)	Brown (5-5)	None		763	27–21	12–9
May 12	at Houston Baptist		Husky Field • Houston, TX	**W** 23–5^{7}	**Rogers** (6-4)	Spinney (3-4)	None		236	28–21	13–9
May 13	at Houston Baptist		Husky Field • Houston, TX	**W** 16–6^{7}	**Jones** (3-0)	Burch (1-4)	**Sheridan** (1)		304	29–21	14–9
May 14	at Houston Baptist		Husky Field • Houston, TX	**W** 14–9	**Stone** (2-0)	Reitmeyer (3-3)	None		389	30–21	15–9

Postseason (4–2)

Southland Tournament (4–2)
Date	Opponent	(Seed)/Rank	Site/stadium	Score	Win	Loss	Save	TV	Attendance	Overall record	Tournament record
May 19	vs. (8) Incarnate Word	(1)	Joe Miller Ballpark • Lake Charles, LA	**W** 12–6	**Rogers** (7-4)	Garza (5-5)	None	ESPN+	611	31–21	1–0
May 20	vs. (4) Nicholls	(1)	Joe Miller Ballpark • Lake Charles, LA	**W** 8–4	**Jones** (4-0)	Theriot (7-5)	**Foster** (12)	ESPN+	678	32–21	2–0
May 21	vs. (8) Incarnate Word	(1)	Joe Miller Ballpark • Lake Charles, LA	**W** 7–2	**Zeppuhar** (2-0)	Cassidy (0-3)	**Stone** (1)	ESPN+	611	33–21	3–0
May 26	vs. (2) Southeastern Louisiana	(1)	Joe Miller Ballpark • Lake Charles, LA	**W** 6–5^{12}	**Foster** (4-2)	Trahan (4-4)	None	ESPN+	1,102	34–21	4–0
May 27	vs. (2) Southeastern Louisiana	(1)	Joe Miller Ballpark • Lake Charles, LA	**L** 2–3	Dugas (4-2)	**Shadrick** (1-2)	None	ESPN+	1,304	34–22	4–1
May 28	vs. (2) Southeastern Louisiana	(1)	Joe Miller Ballpark • Lake Charles, LA	**L** 7–11	O'Toole (4-4)	**Stone** (3-3)	None	ESPN+	1,223	34–23	4–2

Schedule source:

*Rankings are based on the team's current ranking in the D1Baseball poll. |}
