= 2022 Incarnate Word Cardinals baseball team =

American college baseball season

2022 Incarnate Word Cardinals baseball
- Conference: Southland Conference
- Record: 21–31 (9–15 Southland)
- Head coach: Ryan Shotzberger (3rd season)
- Assistant coaches: Kyle Simonds; Greg Evans
- Home stadium: Sullivan Field

2022 Southland Conference baseball standings
	Conf.				Overall
Team	W		L	PCT	W		L	PCT
McNeese State ‍†‍‍	15	–	9	.625	34	–	23	.596
Southeastern Louisiana ‍‍‡‍^{y}	14	–	10	.583	30	–	29	.508
New Orleans ‍‍‍	13	–	11	.542	30	–	23	.566
Nicholls ‍‍‍	12	–	12	.500	26	–	25	.510
Northwestern State ‍‍‍	12	–	12	.500	25	–	29	.463
Houston Baptist ‍‍‍	11	–	13	.458	18	–	36	.333
Texas A&M–Corpus Christi ‍‍‍	10	–	14	.417	27	–	28	.491
Incarnate Word ‍‍‍	9	–	15	.375	21	–	31	.404
† – Conference champion ‡ – Tournament champion y – Invited to the NCAA tournament Rankings from D1Baseball

The 2022 Incarnate Word Cardinals baseball team represented the University of the Incarnate Word during the 2022 NCAA Division I baseball season. The Cardinals played their home games at Sullivan Field and were led by third–year head coach Ryan Shotzberger. They were members of the Southland Conference.

== Preseason ==
=== Southland Conference Coaches Poll ===
The Southland Conference Coaches Poll is to be released in the winter of 2022.

Coaches poll
Predicted finish	Team	Votes (1st place)
1	Southeastern Louisiana	93 (10)
2	McNeese State	80 (3)
3	New Orleans	73
4	Texas A&M–Corpus Christi	63 (1)
5	Northwestern State	55 (2)
6	Incarnate Word	36
T-7	Houston Baptist	24
T-7	Nicholls	24

=== Preseason All-Southland Team & Honors ===
==== Second Team ====
- Grant Smith – Shortstop
- Nixon Brannan – Utility

== Personnel ==
2022 Incarnate Word Cardinals baseball team
Players
Coaches

#	Pos.	Name	B/T	Height	Weight	Year	Home town
0	OF	Braxton Gerek	L/L	5 ft 9 in (1.75 m)	190 lb (86 kg)	Sr	League City, Texas
1	OF	Daniel Calabrese	R/R	5 ft 11 in (1.8 m)	170 lb (77 kg)	Fr	Colleyville, Texas
2	INF	Grant Smith	R/R	6 ft 0 in (1.83 m)	175 lb (79 kg)	Jr	Albuquerque, New Mexico
3	C	Joey Baran	L/R	5 ft 9 in (1.75 m)	172 lb (78 kg)	Fr	Austin, Texas
4	INF	Alec Carr	R/R	6 ft 0 in (1.83 m)	210 lb (95 kg)	Jr	Sugar Land, Texas
5	OF	Ridge Rogers	L/L	5 ft 9 in (1.75 m)	190 lb (86 kg)	Sr	Flower Mound, Texas
6	INF	Taylor Darden	R/R	6 ft 0 in (1.83 m)	175 lb (79 kg)	Jr	Las Vegas, Nevada
7	OF	Warren Laster	L/L	5 ft 10 in (1.78 m)	170 lb (77 kg)	Jr	Pearland, Texas
8	INF	Zach Limas	R/R	5 ft 9 in (1.75 m)	175 lb (79 kg)	Jr	Richmond, Texas
9	OF	Jamey Richey	R/R	6 ft 5 in (1.96 m)	205 lb (93 kg)	Jr	Lindale, Texas
11	RHP	Larry Westall	R/R	6 ft 4 in (1.93 m)	185 lb (84 kg)	So	Round Rock, Texas
12	LHP	Kayden Cassidy (redshirt)	L/L	6 ft 0 in (1.83 m)	180 lb (82 kg)	Jr	Burleson, Texas
13	INF	Roberto Gonzalez	R/R	6 ft 3 in (1.91 m)	195 lb (88 kg)	Jr	Houston, Texas
14	OF	Jack Jalufka (redshirt)	R/R	6 ft 4 in (1.93 m)	190 lb (86 kg)	Fr	Austin, Texas
15	RHP	Steve Hayward (redshirt)	R/R	6 ft 5 in (1.96 m)	188 lb (85 kg)	Jr	Flower Mound, Texas
16	RHP	Seth Higdon	R/R	6 ft 2 in (1.88 m)	205 lb (93 kg)	Jr	Odessa, Texas
17	RHP	Aaron Celestino	R/R	6 ft 0 in (1.83 m)	200 lb (91 kg)	Sr	Houston, Texas
18	RHP	Isaiah Zavala	R/R	5 ft 11 in (1.8 m)	145 lb (66 kg)	Jr	San Antonio, Texas
19	INF	Keaton Grady	R/R	5 ft 7 in (1.7 m)	170 lb (77 kg)	Fr	Elgin, Texas
20	RHP	AJ Sotelo	R/R	5 ft 10 in (1.78 m)	175 lb (79 kg)	Fr	Edinburg, Texas
21	RHP	Drew Minter	R/R	6 ft 1 in (1.85 m)	205 lb (93 kg)	Sr	League City, Texas
22	INF	Til Nalle	R/R	6 ft 1 in (1.85 m)	195 lb (88 kg)	Fr	Elgin, Texas
23	INF	Kaddin Mikulik (redshirt)	L/R	6 ft 3 in (1.91 m)	190 lb (86 kg)	Jr	Flatonia, Texas
24	C	Hernan Yanez	R/R	6 ft 0 in (1.83 m)	200 lb (91 kg)	Jr	San Luis, Arizona
25	RHP	Michael Garza	R/R	6 ft 5 in (1.96 m)	185 lb (84 kg)	Sr	Corpus Christi, Texas
26	C	Nixon Brannan	R/R	6 ft 1 in (1.85 m)	205 lb (93 kg)	Jr	San Angelo, Texas
27	INF	Cole Gaddis	L/L	6 ft 0 in (1.83 m)	240 lb (109 kg)	Fr	Malakoff, Texas
28	RHP	Otto Stacey	R/R	6 ft 2 in (1.88 m)	195 lb (88 kg)	Jr	Spring, Texas
29	C	Reid Hensley	R/R	6 ft 1 in (1.85 m)	198 lb (90 kg)	Fr	Lufkin, Texas
30	RHP	Carson Babb	R/R	6 ft 7 in (2.01 m)	175 lb (79 kg)	Fr	Hutto, Texas
31	RHP	Zach May	R/R	6 ft 2 in (1.88 m)	210 lb (95 kg)	Gr	Bulverde, Texas
32	INF	Jimmy De Leon	R/R	5 ft 8 in (1.73 m)	180 lb (82 kg)	Jr	El Paso, Texas
33	OF	Trey Triolo (redshirt)	L/R	6 ft 1 in (1.85 m)	185 lb (84 kg)	Fr	Lake Travis, Texas
34	LHP	Carson Rollins (redshirt)	L/L	6 ft 2 in (1.88 m)	200 lb (91 kg)	Jr	Katy, Texas
35	OF	Wilson Ehrhardt	L/L	6 ft 1 in (1.85 m)	215 lb (98 kg)	Sr	Katy, Texas
37	OF	Brandon Nations	R/R	6 ft 6 in (1.98 m)	215 lb (98 kg)	Fr	Malakoff, Texas
41	INF	Ron Brown	R/R	6 ft 4 in (1.93 m)	250 lb (113 kg)	Sr	Houston, Texas
42	RHP	JP O'Neal	R/R	6 ft 6 in (1.98 m)	225 lb (102 kg)	Jr	Normangee, Texas
45	RHP	Chandler David	R/R	6 ft 2 in (1.88 m)	205 lb (93 kg)	Jr	Van Alstyne, Texas
49	OF	Jacob Rosales	R/R	5 ft 10 in (1.78 m)	205 lb (93 kg)	Jr	Mission, Texas

Head coach

Ryan Shotzberger (McDaniel College)

Assistant coach(es)

Kyle Simonds (Texas A&M)
Greg Evans (Texas Tech)
Quintin Crandall (Kansas State)

Legend

- (C) Team captain
- (S) Suspended
- (I) Ineligible
- Injured
- Current redshirt

Roster
Last update: 13 April 2022

== Schedule and results ==
Legend
	Incarnate Word win
	Incarnate Word loss
	Postponement/Cancelation/Suspensions
**Bold**	Incarnate Word team member

2022 Incarnate Word Cardinals baseball game log
Regular season (19–29)

February (2–2)
Date	Opponent	Rank	Site/stadium	Score	Win	Loss	Save	TV	Attendance	Overall record	SLC Record
Feb. 18	Bradley		Sullivan Field • San Antonio, TX	Game cancelled							
Feb. 19	Bradley		Sullivan Field • San Antonio, TX	Game cancelled							
Feb. 20	Bradley		Sullivan Field • San Antonio, TX	Game cancelled							
Feb. 22	at Tarleton State		Cecil Ballow Baseball Complex • Stephenville, TX	**L** 0–1	Campa (1-0)	**Stacey** (0-1)	Hickey (1)		106	0–1	
Feb. 24	South Dakota State		Sullivan Field • San Antonio, TX	**W** 10–7	**Celestino** (1-0)	McCay (0-1)	**David** (1)		32	1–1	
Feb. 25	South Dakota State		Sullivan Field • San Antonio, TX	**L** 4–6	Carlson (1-1)	**Cassidy** (0-1)	Bourassa (1)		90	1–2	
Feb. 26	South Dakota State		Sullivan Field • San Antonio, TX	**W** 1–0	**Garza** (1-0)	Bishop (0-2)	**David** (2)		112	2–2	

March (9–9)
Date	Opponent	Rank	Site/stadium	Score	Win	Loss	Save	TV	Attendance	Overall record	SLC Record
Mar. 2	Abilene Christian		Sullivan Field • San Antonio, TX	**W** 12–5	**Higdon** (1-0)	Cervantes (0-1)	None		167	3–2	
Mar. 4	at Houston		Schroeder Park • Houston, TX	**L** 2–5	Prayer (1-0)	**Garza** (1-1)	Torrealba (1)		1,007	3–3	
Mar. 5	at Houston		Schroeder Park • Houston, TX	**W** 13–8	**Celestino** (2-0)	Clayton (0-2)	None		1,083	4–3	
Mar. 6	at Houston		Schroeder Park • Houston, TX	**L** 4–10	Medrano (1-0)	**Zavala** (0-1)	None		1,064	4–4	
Mar. 8	at UTSA		Roadrunner Field • San Antonio, TX	**L** 0–6	Malone (2-0)	**Stacey** (0-2)	None		488	4–5	
Mar. 11	UT Arlington		Sullivan Field • San Antonio, TX	**W** 7–1	**Garza** (2-1)	Wong (1-1)	None		214	5–5	
Mar. 12	UT Arlington		Sullivan Field • San Antonio, TX	**W** 9–3	**Celestino** (3-0)	Bailey (2-1)	None		225	6–5	
Mar. 13	UT Arlington		Sullivan Field • San Antonio, TX	**W** 15–2	**Zavala** (1-1)	Citelli (0-1)	None		185	7–5	
Mar. 15	Texas–Rio Grande Valley		Sullivan Field • San Antonio, TX	**W** 13–8	**Westall** (1-0)	Escobedo (0-1)	None		252	8–5	
Mar. 16	at Columbia		Sullivan Field • San Antonio, TX	**W** 5–3	**Stacey** (1-2)	Tucker (1-1)	**David** (3)		272	9–5	
Mar. 18	at No. 2 Texas		UFCU Disch–Falk Field • Austin, TX	**L** 2–19	Hansen (4-0)	**Garza** (2-2)	None		6,516	9–6	
Mar. 19	at No. 2 Texas		UFCU Disch–Falk Field • Austin, TX	**L** 2–10	Stevens (4-1)	**Celestino** (3-1)	None		7,458	9–7	
Mar. 20	at No. 2 Texas		UFCU Disch–Falk Field • Austin, TX	**L** 0–12	Gordon (1-1)	**Zavala** (1-2)	None		6,786	9–8	
Mar. 22	No. 20 Texas State		Sullivan Field • San Antonio, TX	**W** 4–2	**Rollins** (1-0)	Sundgren (2-2)	**David** (4)		275	10–8	
Mar. 25	at Texas A&M–Corpus Christi		Chapman Field • Corpus Christi, TX	**L** 2–12^{7}	Miller (1-0)	**Garza** (2-3)	None			10–9	0–1
Mar. 26	at Texas A&M–Corpus Christi		Chapman Field • Corpus Christi, TX	**L** 1–4	Thomas (4-1)	**Zavala** (1-3)	Moeller (1)		401	10–10	0–2
Mar. 27	at Texas A&M–Corpus Christi		Chapman Field • Corpus Christi, TX	**W** 7–4	**David** (1-0)	Perez (2-1)	None		309	11–10	1–2
Mar. 29	UTSA		Sullivan Field • San Antonio, TX	**L** 4–6^{10}	Shafer (1-1)	**Hayward** (0-1)	Malone (1)		267	11–11	

April (5–12)
Date	Opponent	Rank	Site/stadium	Score	Win	Loss	Save	TV	Attendance	Overall record	SLC Record
Apr. 1	Southeastern Louisiana		Sullivan Field • San Antonio, TX	**W** 8–6	**Hayward** (1-1)	Landry (1-3)	**David** (5)		322	12–11	2–2
Apr. 2	Southeastern Louisiana		Sullivan Field • San Antonio, TX	**L** 5–10	Dugas (2-1)	**Stacey** (1-3)	None		318	12–12	2–3
Apr. 3	Southeastern Louisiana		Sullivan Field • San Antonio, TX	**L** 5–6	Robb (1-3)	**Hayward** (1-2)	Trahan (3)		167	12–13	2–4
Apr. 8	Northwestern State		Sullivan Field • San Antonio, TX	**W** 8–2	**Rollins** (2-0)	Carver (3-3)	None		195	13–13	3–4
Apr. 9	Northwestern State		Sullivan Field • San Antonio, TX	**W** 6–2	**Garza** (3-3)	Harmon (4-3)	**Hayward** (1)		190	14–13	4–4
Apr. 10	Northwestern State		Sullivan Field • San Antonio, TX	**W** 11–4	**David** (2-0)	Brown (3-3)	None		233	15–13	5–4
Apr. 12	Tarleton State		Sullivan Field • San Antonio, TX	**L** 6–14	Boyd (1-3)	**Minter** (0-1)	None		134	15–14	
Apr. 14	at McNeese State		Joe Miller Ballpark • Lake Charles, LA	**L** 3–9	Rogers (4-3)	**Rollins** (2-1)	None		620	15–15	5–5
Apr. 15	at McNeese State		Joe Miller Ballpark • Lake Charles, LA	**L** 3–4^{11}	Foster (2-1)	**Hayward** (1-3)	None		680	15–16	5–6
Apr. 16	at McNeese State		Joe Miller Ballpark • Lake Charles, LA	**L** 1–11^{7}	Jones (2-0)	**David** (2-1)	None		750	15–17	5–7
Apr. 19	at Texas–Rio Grande Valley		UTRGV Baseball Stadium • Edinburg, TX	**L** 3–9	Garza (1-0)	**Celestino** (3-2)	None		1,127	15–18	
Apr. 22	Nicholls		Sullivan Field • San Antonio, TX	**W** 11–4	**Garza** (4-3)	Desandro (2-3)	None		227	16–18	6–7
Apr. 23	Nicholls		Sullivan Field • San Antonio, TX	**L** 3–5	Theriot (6-2)	**Cassidy** (0-2)	Gearing (2)		253	16–19	6–8
Apr. 24	Nicholls		Sullivan Field • San Antonio, TX	**L** 7–8	Saltaformaggio (3-1)	**Celestino** (3-3)	Gearing (3)		247	16–20	6–9
Apr. 26	at Baylor		Baylor Ballpark • Waco, TX	**L** 7–8	Voelker (3-5)	**Hayward** (1-4)	None		1,435	16–21	
Apr. 29	at Houston Baptist		Husky Field • Houston, TX	**L** 6–13	Spinney (3-3)	**Garza** (4-4)	None		205	16–22	6–10
Apr. 30	at Houston Baptist		Husky Field • Houston, TX	**L** 9–10	Reitmeyer (3-2)	**Mikulik** (0-1)	None		237	16–23	6–11

May (3–6)
Date	Opponent	Rank	Site/stadium	Score	Win	Loss	Save	TV	Attendance	Overall record	SLC Record
May 1	at Houston Baptist		Husky Field • Houston, TX	**L** 7–8	Smitherman (2-1)	**Celestino** (3-4)	Zarella (1)		389	16–24	6–12
May 3	at No. 17 Texas State		Bobcat Ballpark • San Marcos, TX	**L** 1–3	Smith (1-0)	**David** (2-2)	Stivors (10)		1,088	16–25	
May 6	at New Orleans		Maestri Field at Privateer Park • New Orleans, LA	**L** 3–11	Williams (5-1)	**Hayward** (1-5)	None		643	16–26	6–13
May 7	at New Orleans		Maestri Field at Privateer Park • New Orleans, LA	**W** 9–8^{10}	**David** (3-2)	Mead (0-1)	None		304	17–26	7–13
May 8	at New Orleans		Maestri Field at Privateer Park • New Orleans, LA	**L** 8–9^{11}	Cunningham (1-1)	**Hayward** (1-6)	None		406	17–27	7–14
May 10	at TCU		Lupton Stadium • Fort Worth, TX	**L** 7–11^{11}	Hill (1-0)	**Hayward** (1-7)	None		3,386	17–28	
May 12	Texas A&M–Corpus Christi		Sullivan Field • San Antonio, TX	**W** 13–3^{8}	**Garza** (5-4)	Thomas (4-4)	None		215	18–28	8–14
May 13	Texas A&M–Corpus Christi		Sullivan Field • San Antonio, TX	**W** 8–6	**May** (1-0)	Bird (1-2)	**Hayward** (2)		409	19–28	9–14
May 14	Texas A&M–Corpus Christi		Sullivan Field • San Antonio, TX	**L** 2–6	Perez (3-3)	**Zavala** (1-4)	Mejia (1)		212	19–29	9–15
May 17	at Texas A&M		Olsen Field at Blue Bell Park • College Station, TX	Game cancelled							

Postseason (2–2)

Southland Tournament (2–2)
Date	Opponent	(Seed)/Rank	Site/stadium	Score	Win	Loss	Save	TV	Attendance	Overall record	Tournament record
May 19	vs. (1) McNeese State	(8)	Joe Miller Ballpark • Lake Charles, LA	**L** 6–12	Rogers (7-4)	**Garza** (5-5)	None	ESPN+	611	19–30	0–1
May 20	vs. (5) Northwestern State	(8)	Joe Miller Ballpark • Lake Charles, LA	**W** 14–10	**Mikulik** (1-1)	Harmon (5-6)	None	ESPN+	346	20–30	1–1
May 21	vs. (4) Nicholls	(8)	Joe Miller Ballpark • Lake Charles, LA	**W** 9–8	**Hayward** (2-7)	Vial Jr. (1-1)	None	ESPN+	336	21–30	2–1
May 21	vs. (1) McNeese State	(8)	Joe Miller Ballpark • Lake Charles, LA	**L** 2–7	Zeppuhar (2-0)	**Cassidy** (0-3)	Stone (1)	ESPN+	611	21–31	2–2

Schedule source:

*Rankings are based on the team's current ranking in the D1Baseball poll.
