= 2022 Southeastern Louisiana Lions baseball team =

NCAA Division I baseball season

2022 Southeastern Louisiana Lions baseball
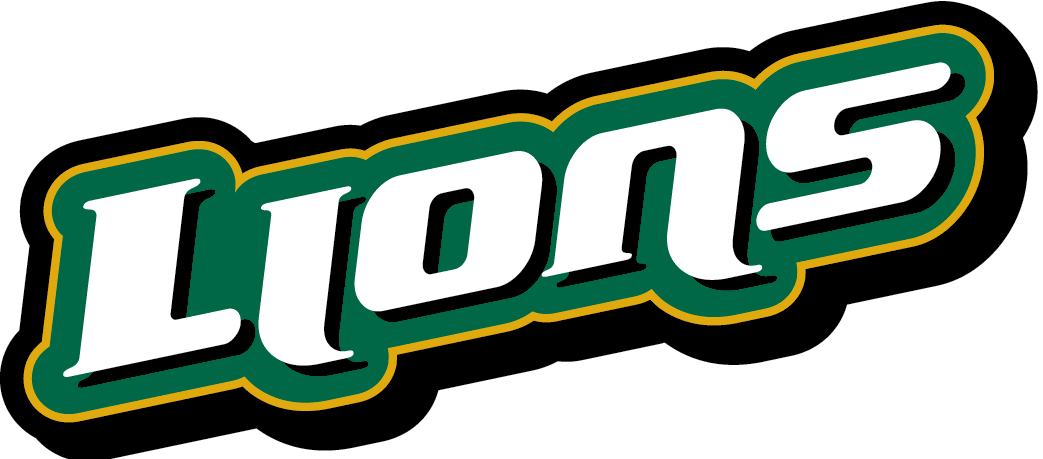

Southland Conference tournament champions

NCAA Auburn Regional, 0–2
- Conference: Southland Conference
- Record: 30–31 (14–10 Southland)
- Head coach: Matt Riser (9th season)
- Assistant coaches: Andrew Gipson; Gerry Salisbury; Ford Pemberton
- Home stadium: Pat Kenelly Diamond at Alumni Field

2022 Southland Conference baseball standings
	Conf.				Overall
Team	W		L	PCT	W		L	PCT
McNeese State ‍†‍‍	15	–	9	.625	34	–	23	.596
Southeastern Louisiana ‍‍‡‍^{y}	14	–	10	.583	30	–	29	.508
New Orleans ‍‍‍	13	–	11	.542	30	–	23	.566
Nicholls ‍‍‍	12	–	12	.500	26	–	25	.510
Northwestern State ‍‍‍	12	–	12	.500	25	–	29	.463
Houston Baptist ‍‍‍	11	–	13	.458	18	–	36	.333
Texas A&M–Corpus Christi ‍‍‍	10	–	14	.417	27	–	28	.491
Incarnate Word ‍‍‍	9	–	15	.375	21	–	31	.404
† – Conference champion ‡ – Tournament champion y – Invited to the NCAA tournament Rankings from D1Baseball

The 2022 Southeastern Louisiana Lions baseball team represented Southeastern Louisiana University during the 2022 NCAA Division I baseball season. The Lions played their home games at Pat Kenelly Diamond at Alumni Field and were led by ninth–year head coach Matt Riser. They were members of the Southland Conference.

== Preseason ==
=== Southland Conference Coaches Poll ===
The Southland Conference Coaches Poll is to be released in the winter of 2022.

Coaches poll
Predicted finish	Team	Votes (1st place)
1	Southeastern Louisiana	93 (10)
2	McNeese State	80 (3)
3	New Orleans	73
4	Texas A&M–Corpus Christi	63 (1)
5	Northwestern State	55 (2)
6	Incarnate Word	36
T-7	Houston Baptist	24
T-7	Nicholls	24

=== Preseason All-Southland Team & Honors ===
==== First Team ====
- Preston Faulkner – 1st Base
- Evan Keller – Shortstop
- Bryce Grizzafi – Catcher
- Tyler Finke – Outfielder
- Brennan Stuprich – Pitcher

==== Second Team ====
- Rhett Rosevear – 2nd Base
- Christian Garcia – Outfielder
- Will Kinzeler – Pitcher

== Personnel ==
2022 Southeastern Louisiana Lions baseball team
Players
Coaches

#	Pos.	Name	B/T	Height	Weight	Year	Home town
1	C	Bryce Grizzaffi	R/R	5 ft 10 in (1.78 m)	175 lb (79 kg)	Jr	Morgan City, Louisiana
2	OF	Tyler Finke	R/R	5 ft 11 in (1.8 m)	165 lb (75 kg)	Sr	Columbus, Indiana
3	OF	Jake Johnson	L/L	5 ft 10 in (1.78 m)	185 lb (84 kg)	Jr	Bullard, Texas
4	INF	Champ Artigues (redshirt)	L/R	5 ft 9 in (1.75 m)	175 lb (79 kg)	Jr	Hammond, Louisiana
5	C	Connor Manola (redshirt)	R/R	6 ft 0 in (1.83 m)	180 lb (82 kg)	Sr	Port Allen, Louisiana
6	INF	Evan Keller	R/R	6 ft 1 in (1.85 m)	187 lb (85 kg)	Gr	Destrehan, Louisiana
7	RHP	Brennan Stuprich	R/R	5 ft 10 in (1.78 m)	205 lb (93 kg)	So	Kenner, Louisiana
8	OF	Joe Delaney	R/R	5 ft 8 in (1.73 m)	150 lb (68 kg)	So	Destrehan, Louisiana
9	OF	Christian Garcia	R/R	5 ft 11 in (1.8 m)	175 lb (79 kg)	Jr	Slidell, Louisiana
10	RHP	Gage Trahan	R/R	5 ft 10 in (1.78 m)	165 lb (75 kg)	Gr	Maurice, Louisiana
11	LHP	Noah Smith	R/L	6 ft 3 in (1.91 m)	153 lb (69 kg)	So	Houston, Texas
12	OF	Nick Ray (redshirt)	R/R	6 ft 2 in (1.88 m)	200 lb (91 kg)	Sr	Jefferson, Louisiana
13	INF	Trey Harrington	R/R	6 ft 2 in (1.88 m)	176 lb (80 kg)	Gr	Lakeland, Tennessee
14	INF	Logan Shurden	L/R	5 ft 7 in (1.7 m)	160 lb (73 kg)	Fr	West Monroe, Louisiana
15	INF	TJ Salvaggio	R/R	6 ft 2 in (1.88 m)	170 lb (77 kg)	Fr	Slidell, Louisiana
16	INF	Rhett Rosevear	L/R	5 ft 10 in (1.78 m)	170 lb (77 kg)	So	Denham Springs, Louisiana
19	OF	Tristan Welch	R/R	6 ft 2 in (1.88 m)	195 lb (88 kg)	Gr	Baton Rouge, Louisiana
21	RHP	Daniel Dugas	R/R	6 ft 0 in (1.83 m)	200 lb (91 kg)	Gr	Pearl River, Louisiana
22	INF	Preston Faulkner	R/R	6 ft 1 in (1.85 m)	230 lb (104 kg)	Sr	Denham Springs, Louisiana
23	INF	Pierce Leavengood	L/R	6 ft 3 in (1.91 m)	200 lb (91 kg)	Jr	Snohomish, Washington
24	RHP	Andrew Landry	R/R	6 ft 1 in (1.85 m)	175 lb (79 kg)	So	Slidell, Louisiana
25	RHP	Grant Upton	R/R	6 ft 3 in (1.91 m)	200 lb (91 kg)	Sr	Baton Rouge, Louisiana
26	RHP	Hunter O'Toole	R/R	6 ft 2 in (1.88 m)	200 lb (91 kg)	Sr	Arkansas City, Kansas
27	RHP	Dalton Aspholm	R/R	6 ft 0 in (1.83 m)	190 lb (86 kg)	Jr	Baton Rouge, Louisiana
28	RHP	Kyle Bartley	R/R	5 ft 11 in (1.8 m)	205 lb (93 kg)	So	Lake Charles, Louisiana
29	RHP	Will Kinzeler	L/R	6 ft 5 in (1.96 m)	180 lb (82 kg)	So	Covington, Louisiana
30	INF	Shea Thomas	R/R	6 ft 3 in (1.91 m)	190 lb (86 kg)	Jr	Olympia, Washington
32	RHP	Lance Lauve	R/R	5 ft 11 in (1.8 m)	203 lb (92 kg)	Fr	Madisonville, Louisiana
34	LHP	Ethan Crayton	L/L	6 ft 2 in (1.88 m)	184 lb (83 kg)	Fr	Loranger, Louisiana
35	RHP	Jacob Sherer	R/R	6 ft 3 in (1.91 m)	215 lb (98 kg)	Jr	Mandeville, Louisiana
36	LHP	Brock Batty	R/L	6 ft 1 in (1.85 m)	210 lb (95 kg)	Gr	Denham Springs, Louisiana
37	RHP	Hayden Robb (redshirt)	R/R	6 ft 2 in (1.88 m)	200 lb (91 kg)	Jr	Vancleave, Mississippi
38	RHP	Reid Reynolds	R/R	6 ft 1 in (1.85 m)	175 lb (79 kg)	Jr	Heidelberg, Mississippi
39	C	Michael Curry	R/R	5 ft 11 in (1.8 m)	175 lb (79 kg)	Fr	Brusly, Louisiana
40	INF	Taylor Phillips (redshirt)	R/R	6 ft 2 in (1.88 m)	195 lb (88 kg)	Fr	Houston, Texas
41	INF	Ethan Butler	R/R	6 ft 1 in (1.85 m)	195 lb (88 kg)	Fr	Baton Rouge, Louisiana
42	RHP	Andrew Yuratich	R/R	6 ft 2 in (1.88 m)	155 lb (70 kg)	Fr	Livingston, Louisiana
43	INF	Christian Westcott (redshirt)	R/R	6 ft 0 in (1.83 m)	195 lb (88 kg)	Fr	Mandeville, Louisiana
44	LHP	Adam Guth	R/L	6 ft 5 in (1.96 m)	225 lb (102 kg)	Fr	Lake Charles, Louisiana
45	RHP	Alex Potter	R/R	5 ft 11 in (1.8 m)	170 lb (77 kg)	Jr	Parker, Colorado
	LHP	Jay Long	L/L	6 ft 3 in (1.91 m)	210 lb (95 kg)	Jr	Stillwell, Kansas
	RHP	Ryan Peters	R/R	6 ft 2 in (1.88 m)	190 lb (86 kg)	So	Cypress, Texas

Head coach

Matt Riser (Tulane)

Assistant coach(es)

Andrew Gipson (Belhaven)
Gerry Salisbury (Ohio)
Ford Pemberton (Arkansas State)

Legend

- (C) Team captain
- (S) Suspended
- (I) Ineligible
- Injured
- Current redshirt

Roster
Last update: 16 April 2022

== Schedule and results ==
Legend
	Southeastern Louisiana win
	Southeastern Louisiana loss
	Postponement/Cancelation/Suspensions
**Bold**	Southeastern Louisiana team member

2022 Southeastern Louisiana Lions baseball game log
Regular season (24–27)

February (3–4)
Date	Opponent	Rank	Site/stadium	Score	Win	Loss	Save	TV	Attendance	Overall record	SLC Record
Feb. 18	SIU Edwardsville		Pat Kenelly Diamond at Alumni Field • Hammond, LA	**W** 1–0	**Kinzeler** (1-0)	Karnes (0-1)	**Harrington** (1)	ESPN+	945	1–0	
Feb. 19	SIU Edwardsville		Pat Kenelly Diamond at Alumni Field • Hammond, LA	**W** 4–3	**Landry** (1-0)	Scherer (0-1)	None	ESPN+	1,085	2–0	
Feb. 20	SIU Edwardsville		Pat Kenelly Diamond at Alumni Field • Hammond, LA	**L** 3–10	Baumgartner (1-0)	**O'Toole** (0-1)	None	ESPN+	1,032	2–1	
Feb. 22	at Louisiana		M. L. Tigue Moore Field at Russo Park • Lafayette, LA	**L** 5–6^{10}	Hammond (1-0)	**Landry** (1-1)	None		4,098	2–2	
Feb. 25	UAB		Pat Kenelly Diamond at Alumni Field • Hammond, LA	**W** 7–4	**Dugas** (1-0)	Myers (1-1)	**Harrington** (2)	ESPN+	920	3–2	
Feb. 26	UAB		Pat Kenelly Diamond at Alumni Field • Hammond, LA	**L** 4–6	Greene (1-0)	**Reynolds** (0-1)	Skinner (1)	ESPN+	954	3–3	
Feb. 27	UAB		Pat Kenelly Diamond at Alumni Field • Hammond, LA	**L** 5–6	Smith (1-0)	**Harrington** (0-1)	None	ESPN+	988	3–4	

March (5–13)
Date	Opponent	Rank	Site/stadium	Score	Win	Loss	Save	TV	Attendance	Overall record	SLC Record
Mar. 1	Tulane		Pat Kenelly Diamond at Alumni Field • Hammond, LA	**L** 1–23	Robinson (1-0)	**Lauve** (0-1)	None	ESPN+	1,436	3–5	
Mar. 2	Louisiana Tech		Pat Kenelly Diamond at Alumni Field • Hammond, LA	**W** 4–3	**Reynolds** (1-1)	Hodges (0-1)	**Trahan** (1)	ESPN+	1,218	4–5	
Mar. 4	at No. 3 Arkansas		Baum–Walker Stadium • Fayetteville, AR	**W** 7–3	**Kinzeler** (2-0)	Noland (1-1)	**Trahan** (2)	SECN+	9,273	5–5	
Mar. 5	at No. 3 Arkansas		Baum–Walker Stadium • Fayetteville, AR	**L** 2–4	Hagen (2-1)	**Harrington** (0-2)	Tygart (1)	SECN+	10,321	5–6	
Mar. 5	at No. 3 Arkansas		Baum–Walker Stadium • Fayetteville, AR	**L** 1–11^{8}	Wiggins (2-0)	**O'Toole** (0-2)	None	SECN+	10,444	5–7	
Mar. 9	at Louisiana Tech		J. C. Love Field at Pat Patterson Park • Ruston, LA	**L** 1–13	Giannette (1-0)	**Lauve** (0-2)	None	CUSA.TV	2,229	5–8	
Mar. 11	Tennessee Tech		Pat Kenelly Diamond at Alumni Field • Hammond, LA	**W** 2–1^{10}	**Trahan** (1-0)	Myers (3-1)	None	ESPN+	941	6–8	
Mar. 12	Tennessee Tech		Pat Kenelly Diamond at Alumni Field • Hammond, LA	**W** 8–2	**O'Toole** (1-2)	Gannaway (2-1)	None	ESPN+	1,001	7–8	
Mar. 13	Tennessee Tech		Pat Kenelly Diamond at Alumni Field • Hammond, LA	**L** 4–18	Adams (1-0)	**Robb** (0-1)	None	ESPN+	984	7–9	
Mar. 15	No. 1 Ole Miss		Pat Kenelly Diamond at Alumni Field • Hammond, LA	**W** 5–1	**Guth** (1-0)	Washburn (2-1)	None	ESPN+	2,915	8–9	
Mar. 18	at Samford		Joe Lee Griffin Stadium • Birmingham, AL	**L** 4–10	Westbrooks (1-0)	**Dugas** (1-1)	None	ESPN+	413	8–10	
Mar. 19	at Samford		Joe Lee Griffin Stadium • Birmingham, AL	**L** 5–6	Bortak (1-2)	**Landry** (1-2)	None	ESPN+	573	8–11	
Mar. 20	at Samford		Joe Lee Griffin Stadium • Birmingham, LA	**L** 8–16	Westbrooks (2-0)	**Robb** (0-2)	None	ESPN+	677	8–12	
Mar. 23	at Tulane		Greer Field at Turchin Stadium • New Orleans, LA	**L** 6–7	Robinson (2-2)	**Guth** (1-1)	Devito (5)	ESPN+	1,405	8–13	
Mar. 25	Nicholls		Pat Kenelly Diamond at Alumni Field • Hammond, LA	**L** 4–6	Andrews (1-0)	**Trahan** (1-1)	Evans (4)	ESPN+	1,224	8–14	0–1
Mar. 26	Nicholls		Pat Kenelly Diamond at Alumni Field • Hammond, LA	**L** 4–11	Gearing (3-1)	**O'Toole** (1-3)	None	ESPN+	1,172	8–15	0–2
Mar. 27	Nicholls		Pat Kenelly Diamond at Alumni Field • Hammond, LA	**L** 7–10	Heckman (1-1)	**Robb** (0-3)	Desandro (1)	ESPN+	1,229	8–16	0–3
Mar. 29	Louisiana		Pat Kenelly Diamond at Alumni Field • Hammond, LA	**L** 4–6	Shifflet (2-1)	**Batty** (0-1)	Menard (2)	ESPN+	1,478	8–17	

April (11–7)
Date	Opponent	Rank	Site/stadium	Score	Win	Loss	Save	TV	Attendance	Overall record	SLC Record
Apr. 1	at Incarnate Word		Sullivan Field • San Antonio, TX	**L** 6–8	Hayward (1-1)	**Landry** (1-3)	David (5)		322	8–18	0–4
Apr. 2	at Incarnate Word		Sullivan Field • San Antonio, TX	**W** 10–5	**Dugas** (2-1)	Stacey (1-3)	None		318	9–18	1–4
Apr. 3	at Incarnate Word		Sullivan Field • San Antonio, TX	**W** 6–5	**Robb** (1-3)	Hayward (1-2)	**Trahan** (3)		167	10–18	2–4
Apr. 5	at South Alabama		Eddie Stanky Field • Mobile, AL	Game cancelled							
Apr. 6	Troy		Pat Kenelly Diamond at Alumni Field • Hammond, LA	**W** 5–4	**Yuratich** (1-0)	Oates (1-1)	None	ESPN+	1,140	11–18	
Apr. 8	Texas A&M–Corpus Christi		Pat Kenelly Diamond at Alumni Field • Hammond, LA	**L** 4–18^{7}	Garcia (3-2)	**Kinzeler** (2-1)	None	ESPN+	1,105	11–19	2–5
Apr. 9	Texas A&M–Corpus Christi		Pat Kenelly Diamond at Alumni Field • Hammond, LA	**W** 12–9	**Landry** (2-3)	Purcell (1-1)	**Trahan** (4)	ESPN+	1,022	12–19	3–5
Apr. 10	Texas A&M–Corpus Christi		Pat Kenelly Diamond at Alumni Field • Hammond, LA	**W** 7–3	**Robb** (2-3)	Ramirez Jr. (1-1)	None	ESPN+	1,007	13–19	4–5
Apr. 12	at No. 11 Southern Miss		Pete Taylor Park • Hattiesburg, MS	**L** 2–3	Gillentine (1-0)	**Lauve** (0-3)	Ramsey (3)	ESPN+	4,567	13–20	
Pontchartrain Bowl
Apr. 14	New Orleans		Pat Kenelly Diamond at Alumni Field • Hammond, LA	**W** 5–4	**O'Toole** (2-3)	Williams (4-1)	**Trahan** (5)	ESPN+	1,123	14–20	5–5
Apr. 15	New Orleans		Pat Kenelly Diamond at Alumni Field • Hammond, LA	**W** 10–5	**Kinzeler** (3-1)	Mitchell (1-4)	None	ESPN+	1,190	15–20	6–5
Apr. 16	New Orleans		Pat Kenelly Diamond at Alumni Field • Hammond, LA	**W** 9–5	**Dugas** (3-1)	Horton (2-1)	None	ESPN+	969	16–20	7–5
Apr. 19	South Alabama		Pat Kenelly Diamond at Alumni Field • Hammond, LA	**W** 8–6	**Trahan** (2-1)	Copenhaver (0-1)	None	ESPN+	1,007	17–20	
Apr. 22	at McNeese State		Joe Miller Ballpark • Lake Charles, LA	**L** 3–7^{11}	Foster (3-1)	**Trahan** (2-2)	None		780	17–21	7–6
Apr. 23	at McNeese State		Joe Miller Ballpark • Lake Charles, LA	**L** 4–6	Stone (1-0)	**Trahan** (2-3)	None		830	17–22	7–7
Apr. 24	at McNeese State		Joe Miller Ballpark • Lake Charles, LA	**L** 4–8	Payne (3-0)	**Landry** (2-4)	Foster (10)		830	17–23	7–8
Apr. 26	No. 4 Southern Miss		Pat Kenelly Diamond at Alumni Field • Hammond, LA	**L** 4–9	Adams (1-0)	**O'Toole** (2-4)	Harper (9)	ESPN+	1,524	17–24	
Apr. 29	at Northwestern State		H. Alvin Brown–C. C. Stroud Field • Natchitoches, LA	**W** 6–4	**Robb** (3-3)	Flowers (0-2)	**Trahan** (6)		510	18–24	8–8
Apr. 30	at Northwestern State		H. Alvin Brown–C. C. Stroud Field • Natchitoches, LA	**W** 4–2	**Guth** (2-1)	Harmon (5-5)	**Trahan** (7)		522	19–24	9–8

May (5–3)
Date	Opponent	Rank	Site/stadium	Score	Win	Loss	Save	TV	Attendance	Overall record	SLC Record
May 1	at Northwestern State		H. Alvin Brown–C. C. Stroud Field • Natchitoches, LA	**L** 2–5	Brown (5-4)	**Landry** (2-5)	None		525	19–25	9–9
May 6	Houston Baptist		Pat Kenelly Diamond at Alumni Field • Hammond, LA	**W** 6–5	**Guth** (3-1)	Ripoll (1-6)	**Trahan** (8)	ESPN+	1,096	20–25	10–9
May 7	Houston Baptist		Pat Kenelly Diamond at Alumni Field • Hammond, LA	**W** 18–15	**Trahan** (3-3)	Bales (0-1)	None	ESPN+	1,030	21–25	11–9
May 8	Houston Baptist		Pat Kenelly Diamond at Alumni Field • Hammond, LA	**W** 12–0^{7}	**Landry** (3-5)	Charles (3-1)	None	ESPN+	1,012	22–25	12–9
May 10	at No. 12 LSU		Alex Box Stadium, Skip Bertman Field • Baton Rouge, LA	**L** 3–17^{7}	Dutton (1-1)	**Yuratich** (1-1)	None	SECN+	10,601	22–26	
May 12	at Nicholls		Ben Meyer Diamond at Ray E. Didier Field • Thibodaux, LA	**W** 3–2	**Kinzeler** (4-1)	Desandro (3-4)	**Trahan** (9)		588	23–26	13–9
May 13	at Nicholls		Ben Meyer Diamond at Ray E. Didier Field • Thibodaux, LA	**W** 8–6	**Robb** (4-3)	Theriot (7-4)	**Trahan** (10)		337	24–26	14–9
May 14	at Nicholls		Ben Meyer Diamond at Ray E. Didier Field • Thibodaux, LA	**L** 3–4^{11}	Heckman (2-5)	**Dugas** (3-2)	None		337	24–27	14–10

Postseason (6–4)

Southland Tournament (6–2)
Date	Opponent	(Seed)/Rank	Site/stadium	Score	Win	Loss	Save	TV	Attendance	Overall record	Tournament record
May 19	vs. (7) Texas A&M–Corpus Christi	(2)	Pat Kenelly Diamond at Alumni Field • Hammond, LA	**L** 5–6	Garcia (6-3)	**Kinzeler** (4-2)	Mejia (2)	ESPN+	680	24–28	0–1
May 20	vs. (6) Houston Baptist	(2)	Pat Kenelly Diamond at Alumni Field • Hammond, LA	**W** 12–4	**Guth** (4-1)	Burch (1-5)	None	ESPN+	522	25–28	1–1
May 21	vs. (7) Texas A&M–Corpus Christi	(2)	Pat Kenelly Diamond at Alumni Field • Hammond, LA	**W** 18–11	**Aspholm** (1-0)	Purcell (1-4)	**Trahan** (11)	ESPN+	590	26–28	2–1
May 21	vs. (3) New Orleans	(2)	Pat Kenelly Diamond at Alumni Field • Hammond, LA	**W** 25–4^{7}	**O'Toole** (3-4)	Blanchard (1-1)	None	ESPN+	591	27–28	3–1
May 22	vs. (3) New Orleans	(2)	Pat Kenelly Diamond at Alumni Field • Hammond, LA	**W** 4–3^{10}	**Trahan** (4-3)	Williams (7-2)	None	ESPN+	564	28–28	4–1
May 26	vs. (1) McNeese State	(2)	Joe Miller Ballpark • Lake Charles, LA	**L** 5–6^{12}	Foster (4-2)	**Trahan** (4-4)	None	ESPN+	1,102	28–29	4–2
May 27	vs. (1) McNeese State	(2)	Joe Miller Ballpark • Lake Charles, LA	**W** 3–2	**Dugas** (4-2)	Shadrick (1-2)	None	ESPN+	1,304	29–29	5–2
May 28	vs. (1) McNeese State	(2)	Joe Miller Ballpark • Lake Charles, LA	**W** 11–7	**O'Toole** (4-4)	Stone (3-3)	None	ESPN+	1,223	30–29	6–2

NCAA tournament (0–2)
Date	Opponent	(Seed)/Rank	Site/stadium	Score	Win	Loss	Save	TV	Attendance	Overall record	Tournament record
Auburn Regional
Jun. 3	vs. (1)/No. 25 Auburn	(4)	Plainsman Park • Auburn, AL	**L** 7–19	Bright (4-4)	**Guth** (4-2)	None	ESPN+	3,388	30–30	0–1
Jun. 4	vs. (2)/No. 19 UCLA	(4)	Plainsman Park • Auburn, AL	**L** 2–16	Saum (4-0)	**Landry** (3-6)	None	ESPN2	3,218	30–31	0–2

Schedule source:

*Rankings are based on the team's current ranking in the D1Baseball poll. |}

== Auburn Regional ==
Auburn Regional Teams
(1) Auburn Tigers	(2) UCLA Bruins	(3) Florida State Seminoles	(4) Southeastern Louisiana Lions

First Round
1	No. 25 Auburn	19
4	Southeastern Louisiana	7
3	Florida State	5
2	No. 19 UCLA	3
Lower round 1
4	Southeastern Louisiana	2
2	No. 19 UCLA	16

Semi-Finals
1	No. 25 Auburn	21
3	Florida State	7
Lower final
2	No. 19 UCLA	2
3	Florida State	1

Finals
1	No. 25 Auburn	11	-
2	No. 19 UCLA	4	-
