= Justin Hill (baseball) =

American college baseball coach

Current position
- Title: Head coach
- Team: McNeese
- Conference: Southland
- Record: 364–282

Biographical details
- Born: West Monroe, Louisiana, U.S.

Playing career
- 1999: Mississippi Delta
- 2000: Bossier Parish
- 2001–2002: LSU

Coaching career (HC unless noted)
- 2003: West Monroe (LA) (Asst.)
- 2004–2005: Northwestern State (Asst.)
- 2006: LSU (Asst.)
- 2007: Sam Houston State (Asst.)
- 2008–2011: Southeastern Louisiana (Asst.)
- 2012–2013: Louisiana–Monroe (Asst.)
- 2014–present: McNeese

Head coaching record
- Overall: 364–282
- Tournaments: NCAA: 0–4

Accomplishments and honors

Championships
- 2× Southland Tournament (2019, 2021); 2× Southland Conference Regular season (2017, 2022)

Justin Hill is an American college baseball coach and former player, who is the current head baseball coach of the McNeese Cowboys. He was named to that position prior to the 2014 season.

Hill played at Mississippi Delta Community College and Bossier Parish Community College, then completed his final two years of eligibility at LSU, winning a pair of regionals with the Tigers. He then began his coaching career as an assistant at West Monroe High School before moving up to Northwestern State. After two seasons, he spent on year at LSU before moving to Sam Houston State for one year. Hill was next named Associate Head Coach at Southeastern Louisiana, where he served for four seasons. In 2012, he moved to the same position at Louisiana–Monroe. In June 2014, he was named to his first head coaching position at McNeese State.

== Head coaching record ==
Below is a table of Hill's yearly records as an NCAA head baseball coach.

Record table
Season	Team	Overall	Conference	Standing	Postseason
McNeese State Cowboys (Southland Conference) (2014–present)
2014	McNeese State	30–28	17–13	T–6th	Southland tournament
2015	McNeese State	32–25	18–12	4th	Southland tournament
2016	McNeese State	31–25	15–15	6th	Southland tournament
2017	McNeese State	37–20	22–8	1st	Southland tournament
2018	McNeese State	25–33	15–15	6th	Southland tournament
2019	McNeese State	35–26	16–14	T–5th	NCAA Regional
2020	McNeese State	10–7	0–0		Season canceled due to COVID-19
2021	McNeese State	32–28	21–18	7th	NCAA Regional
2022	McNeese State	34–23	15–9	1st	Southland tournament
2023	McNeese State	35–23	12–12	T–5th	Southland tournament
2024	McNeese State	32–27	11–13	5th	Southland tournament
2025	McNeese State	31–17	19–11	T–4th	Southland tournament
McNeese State:		364–282	181−140		
Total:		364–282			
National champion Postseason invitational champion Conference regular season champion Conference regular season and conference tournament champion Division regular season champion Division regular season and conference tournament champion Conference tournament champion

== See also ==
- List of current NCAA Division I baseball coaches
