= 2022 New Orleans Privateers baseball team =

American college baseball season

2022 New Orleans Privateers baseball
- Conference: Southland Conference
- Record: 30–23 (13–11 Southland)
- Head coach: Blake Dean (7th season)
- Assistant coaches: Brett Stewart; Dax Norris
- Home stadium: Maestri Field at Privateer Park

2022 Southland Conference baseball standings
	Conf.				Overall
Team	W		L	PCT	W		L	PCT
McNeese State ‍†‍‍	15	–	9	.625	34	–	23	.596
Southeastern Louisiana ‍‍‡‍^{y}	14	–	10	.583	30	–	29	.508
New Orleans ‍‍‍	13	–	11	.542	30	–	23	.566
Nicholls ‍‍‍	12	–	12	.500	26	–	25	.510
Northwestern State ‍‍‍	12	–	12	.500	25	–	29	.463
Houston Baptist ‍‍‍	11	–	13	.458	18	–	36	.333
Texas A&M–Corpus Christi ‍‍‍	10	–	14	.417	27	–	28	.491
Incarnate Word ‍‍‍	9	–	15	.375	21	–	31	.404
† – Conference champion ‡ – Tournament champion y – Invited to the NCAA tournament Rankings from D1Baseball

The 2022 New Orleans Privateers baseball team represented the University of New Orleans during the 2022 NCAA Division I baseball season. The Privateers played their home games at Maestri Field at Privateer Park and were led by seventh–year head coach Blake Dean. They were members of the Southland Conference.

== Preseason ==
=== Southland Conference Coaches Poll ===
The Southland Conference Coaches Poll was released on February 11, 2021, and the Privateers were picked to finish third in the conference with 73 votes.

Coaches poll
Predicted finish	Team	Votes (1st place)
1	Southeastern Louisiana	93 (10)
2	McNeese State	80 (3)
3	New Orleans	73
4	Texas A&M–Corpus Christi	63 (1)
5	Northwestern State	55 (2)
6	Incarnate Word	36
T–7	Houston Baptist	24
T–7	Nicholls	24

=== Preseason All-Southland Team ===
The following players were named to the 2022 Preseason All-Southland Team, voted on by the league's coaches.

1st Team

- Kasten Furr – Third Baseman
- Pearce Howard – Outfielder
- Caleb Seroski – Relief Pitcher

2nd Team

- Anthony Herron Jr. – Designated Hitter

== Personnel ==
2022 New Orleans Privateers baseball team
Players
Coaches

#	Pos.	Name	B/T	Height	Weight	Year	Home town
1	RHP	Cortlynn Ramirez	R/R	6 ft 5 in (1.96 m)	195 lb (88 kg)	So	Center Point, Louisiana
2	RHP	Caleb Seroski	R/R	6 ft 1 in (1.85 m)	155 lb (70 kg)	Fr	New Iberia, Louisiana
3	INF	Darren Willis	R/R	5 ft 9 in (1.75 m)	170 lb (77 kg)	Sr	Metairie, Louisiana
4	OF	Luther Woullard	R/R	6 ft 1 in (1.85 m)	210 lb (95 kg)	Sr	D'Iberville, Mississippi
5	RHP	Matt Barthelemy	R/R	5 ft 10 in (1.78 m)	165 lb (75 kg)	So	Belle Chasse, Louisiana
6	INF	Vincent Sanchez	R/R	5 ft 8 in (1.73 m)	175 lb (79 kg)	Fr	Houston, Texas
7	RHP	Chris Turpin	R/R	6 ft 0 in (1.83 m)	175 lb (79 kg)	Sr	Belle Chasse, Louisiana
8	LHP	Tyler LeBlanc	L/L	6 ft 4 in (1.93 m)	200 lb (91 kg)	Fr	Lafayette, Louisiana
9	OF	Issac Williams	R/R	5 ft 10 in (1.78 m)	195 lb (88 kg)	Fr	Alexandria, Louisiana
10	C	Beau Bratton	L/R	5 ft 11 in (1.8 m)	190 lb (86 kg)	Sr	Biloxi, Mississippi
11	INF	Hudson Laborde (redshirt)	R/R	6 ft 0 in (1.83 m)	205 lb (93 kg)	Jr	Lafayette, Louisiana
12	RHP	Haden Erbe	R/R	6 ft 3 in (1.91 m)	225 lb (102 kg)	RS Jr	Lafayette, Louisiana
13	OF	KC Simonich	L/R	6 ft 3 in (1.91 m)	195 lb (88 kg)	Jr	Lemont, Illinois
15	LHP	Kyle Khachadourian	R/L	6 ft 0 in (1.83 m)	215 lb (98 kg)	Jr	Palm Beach Gardens, Florida
16	RHP	Connor Macip	R/R	6 ft 3 in (1.91 m)	223 lb (101 kg)	Fr	Scott, Louisiana
17	INF	Travis Gober	L/R	6 ft 3 in (1.91 m)	225 lb (102 kg)	Fr	Rockwall, Texas
18	INF	Kasten Furr	R/R	5 ft 9 in (1.75 m)	180 lb (82 kg)	Fr	Ruston, Louisiana
19	RHP	Austin Acree	R/R	6 ft 2 in (1.88 m)	220 lb (100 kg)	RS Fr	West Monroe, Louisiana
20	INF	Blake Way	R/R	5 ft 10 in (1.78 m)	205 lb (93 kg)	Sr	Slidell, Louisiana
22	LHP	Cristian Poche	L/L	6 ft 0 in (1.83 m)	180 lb (82 kg)	RS Fr	New Orleans, Louisiana
24	RHP	Jacob Mead	R/R	6 ft 4 in (1.93 m)	210 lb (95 kg)	Jr	Round Rock, Texas
25	RHP	Collin Kulivan	R/R	6 ft 4 in (1.93 m)	220 lb (100 kg)	Jr	New Orleans, Louisiana
26	C	Andrew Guidry	L/R	6 ft 1 in (1.85 m)	187 lb (85 kg)	Fr	Lafayette, Louisiana
27	OF	Gaige Howard	L/R	6 ft 2 in (1.88 m)	220 lb (100 kg)	Sr	Carlsbad, California
28	RHP	Rudy Amaya (redshirt)	R/R	6 ft 2 in (1.88 m)	190 lb (86 kg)	Jr	Pooler, Georgia
29	INF	Salo Iza	R/R	6 ft 0 in (1.83 m)	180 lb (82 kg)	Sr	Key Biscayne, Florida
30	RHP	Joshua Cerejo	R/R	6 ft 3 in (1.91 m)	210 lb (95 kg)	So	Walnut Creek, California
31	LHP	Matt Delcambre	L/L	6 ft 3 in (1.91 m)	205 lb (93 kg)	So	Lafayette, Louisiana
32	RHP	Bailey Holstein	R/R	6 ft 3 in (1.91 m)	225 lb (102 kg)	RS Sr	Denham Springs, Louisiana
33	LHP	Brandon Mitchell	L/L	6 ft 2 in (1.88 m)	220 lb (100 kg)	So	Houston, Texas
34	C	Jorge Tejeda	R/R	5 ft 10 in (1.78 m)	190 lb (86 kg)	So	Villa Clara, Cuba
35	OF	Pearce Howard	L/R	6 ft 4 in (1.93 m)	225 lb (102 kg)	Jr	Silver Spring, Maryland
36	RHP	Jacob Lamkin (redshirt)	R/R	5 ft 9 in (1.75 m)	175 lb (79 kg)	Fr	Youngsville, Louisiana
37	C	Jackson Murphy	R/R	6 ft 0 in (1.83 m)	190 lb (86 kg)	Jr	Troy, Alabama
38	RHP	Brad Randazzo	R/R	6 ft 0 in (1.83 m)	160 lb (73 kg)	Jr	Metairie, Louisiana
40	RHP	Beau Blanchard	R/R	6 ft 5 in (1.96 m)	200 lb (91 kg)	Fr	New Iberia, Louisiana
41	RHP	Patrick Apgar	R/R	6 ft 8 in (2.03 m)	235 lb (107 kg)	Fr	Little Egg Harbor, New Jersey
42	RHP	Jalen Cowan	R/R	6 ft 2 in (1.88 m)	245 lb (111 kg)	Fr	Clinton, Mississippi
45	LHP	Keegan Rich	L/L	6 ft 4 in (1.93 m)	225 lb (102 kg)	Fr	Newnan, Georgia
52	LHP	Christopher DeMayo	L/L	6 ft 0 in (1.83 m)	160 lb (73 kg)	Sr	Stuart, Florida
	RHP	Kindred Atwood	R/R	6 ft 3 in (1.91 m)	200 lb (91 kg)	Fr	Ayer, Massachusetts
	OF	Jamarian Crain	R/R	5 ft 10 in (1.78 m)	170 lb (77 kg)	Jr	Franklinton, Louisiana
	OF	Max Dias	R/R	6 ft 0 in (1.83 m)	210 lb (95 kg)	Fr	Porter, Texas
	P	Michael Kokoszka	/	—	—	So	Westmont, Illinois
	INF	Tyler Pope	R/R	5 ft 10 in (1.78 m)	185 lb (84 kg)	Fr	Alexandria, Louisiana
	RHP	Tanner Young	R/R	6 ft 1 in (1.85 m)	160 lb (73 kg)	Jr	Vinton, Louisiana

Head coach

Blake Dean (Louisiana State)

Assistant coach(es)

Brett Stewart (Appalachian State)
A. J. Battisto (University of Phoenix)
Hezekiah Randolph (New Orleans)

Legend

- (C) Team captain
- (S) Suspended
- (I) Ineligible
- Injured
- Current redshirt

Roster
Last update: 2021 June 15

== Schedule and results ==
Legend
	New Orleans win
	New Orleans loss
	Postponement/Cancelation/Suspensions
**Bold**	New Orleans team member

2022 New Orleans Privateers baseball game log
Regular season (28–21)

February (5–1)
Date	Opponent	Rank	Site/stadium	Score	Win	Loss	Save	TV	Attendance	Overall record	SLC Record
Andre Dawson Classic
Feb. 18	Arkansas–Pine Bluff		Maestri Field at Privateer Park • New Orleans, LA	**W** 9–3	**LeBlanc** (1–0)	Duran (0–1)	None		505	1–0	
Feb. 19	Grambling		Maestri Field at Privateer Park • New Orleans, LA	**W** 12–2^{7}	**Porter** (1–0)	Rudy (0–1)	None		517	2–0	
Feb. 20	Alabama State		Maestri Field at Privateer Park • New Orleans, LA	**W** 10–0^{8}	**Horton** (1–0)	King (0–1)	None		740	3–0	
Feb. 25	Kansas		Maestri Field at Privateer Park • New Orleans, LA	**W** 4–3	**LeBlanc** (2–0)	Larsen (0–1)	**Seroski** (1)		427	4–0	
Feb. 26	Kansas		Maestri Field at Privateer Park • New Orleans, LA	**L** 2–8	Vanderhei (2–0)	**Porter** (1–1)	None		452	4–1	
Feb. 27	Kansas		Maestri Field at Privateer Park • New Orleans, LA	**W** 5–2	**Williams** (1–0)	Brady (0–2)	**Seroski** (2)		387	5–1	

March (9–8)
Date	Opponent	Rank	Site/stadium	Score	Win	Loss	Save	TV	Attendance	Overall record	SLC Record
Mar. 2	at No. 7 LSU		Alex Box Stadium • Baton Rouge, LA	**L** 3–11	Taylor (1–0)	**Khachadourian** (0–1)	None	SECN+	10,203	5–2	
Mar. 4	at Louisiana–Monroe		Warhawk Field • Monroe, LA	**W** 8–2	**LeBlanc** (3–0)	Barlow (0–1)	None		1,031	6–2	
Mar. 5	at Louisiana–Monroe		Warhawk Field • Monroe, LA	**W** 13–11	**Seroski** (1–0)	Wepf (1–2)	None		1,052	7–2	
Mar. 6	at Louisiana–Monroe		Warhawk Field • Monroe, LA	**W** 10–5	**Williams** (2–0)	Lien (0–1)	None		989	8–2	
Mar. 11	Youngstown State		Maestri Field at Privateer Park • New Orleans, LA	**L** 5–6	Mikos (1–0)	**Seroski** (1–1)	Ball (4)	ESPN+	145	8–3	
Mar. 12	Youngstown State		Maestri Field at Privateer Park • New Orleans, LA	**W** 8–7^{10}	**Gauthe** (1–0)	Ball (0–2)	None	ESPN+	244	9–3	
Mar. 12	Youngstown State		Maestri Field at Privateer Park • New Orleans, LA	**L** 2–3	Perry (1–1)	**Mitchell** (0–1)	Perez (1)	ESPN+	658	9–4	
Mar. 13	Youngstown State		Maestri Field at Privateer Park • New Orleans, LA	**W** 1–0	**Williams** (3–0)	Brosky (1–2)	None	ESPN+	475	10–4	
Mar. 15	South Alabama		Maestri Field at Privateer Park • New Orleans, LA	**L** 1–6	Lehrmann (1–0)	**Cerejo** (0–1)	None	ESPN+	467	10–5	
Mar. 18	at Oklahoma		L. Dale Mitchell Baseball Park • Norman, OK	**W** 10–7^{12}	**Seroski** (2–1)	Atwood (2–2)	None		746	11–5	
Mar. 19	at Oklahoma		L. Dale Mitchell Baseball Park • Norman, OK	**L** 8–13	Sundloff (2–0)	**Mitchell** (0–2)	None		1,006	11–6	
Mar. 20	at Oklahoma		L. Dale Mitchell Baseball Park • Norman, OK	**W** 11–5	**Horton** (2–0)	Martinez (2–2)	None		797	12–6	
Mar. 23	Southern Miss		Maestri Field at Privateer Park • New Orleans, LA	**L** 8–12	Rhodes (1–0)	**Cunningham** (0–1)	None	ESPN+	452	12–7	
Mar. 25	Northwestern State		Maestri Field at Privateer Park • New Orleans, LA	**W** 7–6	**Williams** (4–0)	Flowers (0–1)	None	ESPN+	623	13–7	1–0
Mar. 26	Northwestern State		Maestri Field at Privateer Park • New Orleans, LA	**L** 1–2	Harmon (3–2)	**Mitchell** (0–3)	None	ESPN+	415	13–8	1–1
Mar. 27	Northwestern State		Maestri Field at Privateer Park • New Orleans, LA	**L** 10–16	Brown (3–2)	**Lamkin** (0–1)	None	ESPN+	454	13–9	1–2
Mar. 29	Tulane		Maestri Field at Privateer Park • New Orleans, LA	**W** 14–6	**Khachadourian** (1–1)	Robinson (2–3)	None	ESPN+	816	14–9	

April (8–9)
Date	Opponent	Rank	Site/stadium	Score	Win	Loss	Save	TV	Attendance	Overall record	SLC Record
Apr. 1	at Houston Baptist		Husky Field • Houston, TX	**W** 18–3^{7}	**LeBlanc** (4–0)	Tinker (0–4)	None	ESPN+	320	15–9	2–2
Apr. 2	at Houston Baptist		Husky Field • Houston, TX	**L** 3–5	Charles (1–0)	**Gauthe** (1–1)	Reitmeyer (6)	ESPN+	367	15–10	2–3
Apr. 3	at Houston Baptist		Husky Field • Houston, TX	**W** 14–10	**Khachadourian** (2–1)	Powell (0–1)	None	ESPN+	385	16–10	3–3
Apr. 8	McNeese State		Maestri Field at Privateer Park • New Orleans, LA	**W** 9–5	**LeBlanc** (5–0)	Rogers (3–3)	None	ESPN+	733	17–10	4–3
Apr. 9	McNeese State		Maestri Field at Privateer Park • New Orleans, LA	**W** 11–2	**Mitchell** (1–3)	Abraham (2–4)	None	ESPN+	513	18–10	5–3
Apr. 10	McNeese State		Maestri Field at Privateer Park • New Orleans, LA	**W** 11–9	**Seroski** (3–1)	Vega (2–2)	**Paplham** (1)	ESPN+	428	19–10	6–3
Apr. 12	Tulane		Maestri Field at Privateer Park • New Orleans, LA	**L** 2–4	Slagel (1–1)	**Kulivan** (0–1)	Devito (9)	ESPN+	951	19–11	
Apr. 14	at Southeastern Louisiana		Pat Kenelly Diamond at Alumni Field • Hammond, LA	**L** 4–5	O'Toole (2–3)	**Williams** (4–1)	Trahan (5)	ESPN+	1,123	19–12	6–4
Apr. 15	at Southeastern Louisiana		Pat Kenelly Diamond at Alumni Field • Hammond, LA	**L** 5–10	Kinzeler (3–1)	**Mitchell** (1–4)	None	ESPN+	1,190	19–13	6–5
Apr. 16	at Southeastern Louisiana		Pat Kenelly Diamond at Alumni Field • Hammond, LA	**L** 5–9	Dugas (3–1)	**Horton** (2–1)	None	ESPN+	969	19–14	6–6
Apr. 20	at No. 6 Southern Miss		Pete Taylor Park • Hattiesburg, MS	**L** 5–10	Gillentine (2–0)	**Khachadourian** (2–2)	Rogers (2)	ESPN+	4,688	19–15	
Apr. 22	Texas A&M–Corpus Christi		Maestri Field at Privateer Park • New Orleans, LA	**W** 13–3^{7}	**LeBlanc** (6–0)	Garcia (4–3)	None	ESPN+	600	20–15	7–6
Apr. 23	Texas A&M–Corpus Christi		Maestri Field at Privateer Park • New Orleans, LA	**L** 9–11	Westbrook (2–1)	**Mitchell** (1–5)	None	ESPN+	535	20–16	7–7
Apr. 24	Texas A&M–Corpus Christi		Maestri Field at Privateer Park • New Orleans, LA	**W** 14–6	**Khachadourian** (3–2)	Mejia (0–1)	None	ESPN+	244	21–16	8–7
Apr. 26	No. 22 LSU		Maestri Field at Privateer Park • New Orleans, LA	**W** 9–4	**Blanchard** (1–0)	Floyd (4–3)	None	ESPN+	5,000	22–16	
Apr. 29	at Nicholls		Ray E. Didier Field • Thibodaux, LA	**L** 2–12^{8}	Desandro (3-3)	**LeBlanc** (6-1)	None		439	22–17	8–8
Apr. 30	at Nicholls		Ray E. Didier Field • Thibodaux, LA	**L** 4–6	Theriot (7-2)	**Mitchell** (1-6)	Gearing (4)		411	22–18	8–9

May (6–3)
Date	Opponent	Rank	Site/stadium	Score	Win	Loss	Save	TV	Attendance	Overall record	SLC Record
May 1	at Nicholls		Ray E. Didier Field • Thibodaux, LA	**W** 6–2	**Khachadourian** (4-2)	Heckman (1-4)	**Williams** (1)		402	23–18	9–9
May 3	at Tulane		Greer Field at Turchin Stadium • New Orleans, LA	**L** 5–6	Knueppel (1-0)	**Horton** (2-2)	Welch (1)	ESPN+	1,604	23–19	
May 6	Incarnate Word		Maestri Field at Privateer Park • New Orleans, LA	**W** 11–3	**Williams** (5-1)	Hayward (1-5)	None	ESPN+	643	24–19	10–9
May 7	Incarnate Word		Maestri Field at Privateer Park • New Orleans, LA	**L** 8–9	David (3-2)	**Mead** (0-1)	None	ESPN+	304	24–20	10–10
May 8	Incarnate Word		Maestri Field at Privateer Park • New Orleans, LA	**W** 9–8^{11}	**Cunningham** (1-1)	Hayward (1-6)	None	ESPN+	406	25–20	11–10
May 12	at Northwestern State		Brown–Stroud Field • Natchitoches, LA	**W** 6–4	**Williams** (6-1)	Collins (3-1)	None		519	26–20	12–10
May 13	at Northwestern State		Brown–Stroud Field • Natchitoches, LA	**L** 11–14	Taylor (3-1)	**Porter** (1-2)	Francis (1)		530	26–21	12–11
May 14	at Northwestern State		Brown–Stroud Field • Natchitoches, LA	**W** 11–4	**Khachadourian** (5-2)	Brown (5-6)	**Seroski** (3)		602	27–21	13–11
May 17	Southern		Maestri Field at Privateer Park • New Orleans, LA	**W** 5–4	**Mead** (1-1)	Page (2-3)	**Paplham** (2)	ESPN+	626	28–21	

Post-season (2–2)

SLC Tournament (2–2)
Date	Opponent	Seed/Rank	Site/stadium	Score	Win	Loss	Save	TV	Attendance	Overall record	Tournament record
May 19	(6) Houston Baptist	(3)	Pat Kenelly Diamond at Alumni Field • Hammond, LA	**W** 10–3	**LeBlanc** (7–1)	Bales (0–2)	None	ESPN+	477	29–21	1–0
May 20	(7) Texas A&M–Corpus Christi	(3)	Pat Kenelly Diamond at Alumni Field • Hammond, LA	**W** 10–9	**Williams** (7–1)	Thomas (4–5)	**Cunningham** (1)	ESPN+	527	30–21	2–0
May 21	(2) Southeastern Louisiana	(3)	Pat Kenelly Diamond at Alumni Field • Hammond, LA	**L** 4–25^{7}	O'Toole (3–4)	**Blanchard** (1–1)	None	ESPN+	591	30–22	2–1
May 22	(2) Southeastern Louisiana	(3)	Pat Kenelly Diamond at Alumni Field • Hammond, LA	**L** 3–4^{10}	Trahan (4–3)	**Williams** (7–2)	None	ESPN+	564	30–23	2–2

Schedule source:

*Rankings are based on the team's current ranking in the D1Baseball poll.
