= 2022 Nicholls Colonels baseball team =

American college baseball season

2022 Nicholls Colonels baseball
- Conference: Southland Conference
- Record: 26–25 (12–12 Southland)
- Head coach: Mike Silva (1st season)
- Assistant coaches: Ladd Rhodes; Cody Livingston; Gabe Woods
- Home stadium: Ben Meyer Diamond at Ray E. Didier Field

2022 Southland Conference baseball standings
| | Conf. | | | | Overall |
| Team | W | | L | PCT | W | | L | PCT |
|---|---|---|---|---|---|---|---|---|
| McNeese State ‍†‍‍ | 15 | – | 9 | .625 | 34 | – | 23 | .596 |
| Southeastern Louisiana ‍‍‡‍^{y} | 14 | – | 10 | .583 | 30 | – | 29 | .508 |
| New Orleans ‍‍‍ | 13 | – | 11 | .542 | 30 | – | 23 | .566 |
| Nicholls ‍‍‍ | 12 | – | 12 | .500 | 26 | – | 25 | .510 |
| Northwestern State ‍‍‍ | 12 | – | 12 | .500 | 25 | – | 29 | .463 |
| Houston Baptist ‍‍‍ | 11 | – | 13 | .458 | 18 | – | 36 | .333 |
| Texas A&M–Corpus Christi ‍‍‍ | 10 | – | 14 | .417 | 27 | – | 28 | .491 |
| Incarnate Word ‍‍‍ | 9 | – | 15 | .375 | 21 | – | 31 | .404 |
† – Conference champion ‡ – Tournament champion y – Invited to the NCAA tournament Rankings from D1Baseball

The 2022 Nicholls Colonels baseball team represented Nicholls State University during the 2022 NCAA Division I baseball season. The Colonels played their home games at Ben Meyer Diamond at Ray E. Didier Field and were led by first–year head coach Mike Silva. They were members of the Southland Conference.

== Preseason ==
=== Southland Conference Coaches Poll ===
The Southland Conference Coaches Poll was released on February 10, 2022 and the Colonels were picked to finish tied for seventh in the conference with 24 votes.

Coaches poll
| Predicted finish | Team | Votes (1st place) |
| 1 | Southeastern Louisiana | 93 (10) |
| 2 | McNeese State | 80 (3) |
| 3 | New Orleans | 73 |
| 4 | Texas A&M–Corpus Christi | 63 (1) |
| 5 | Northwestern State | 55 (2) |
| 6 | Incarnate Word | 36 |
| T7 | Houston Baptist | 24 |
| T7 | Nicholls | 24 |

=== Preseason All-Southland Team & Honors ===
==== Second Team ====
- Austin Cain – 3rd Base

== Personnel ==
2022 Nicholls Colonels baseball team
Players
Coaches

| # | Pos. | Name | B/T | Height | Weight | Year | Home town |
|---|---|---|---|---|---|---|---|
| 1 | INF | Jordan Thompson | R/R | 6 ft 2 in (1.88 m) | 175 lb (79 kg) | Fr | Moss Bluff, Louisiana |
| 2 | INF | Nick Fields | L/R | 6 ft 0 in (1.83 m) | 185 lb (84 kg) | So | Galesburg, Illinois |
| 3 | RHP | Cade Evans | R/R | 6 ft 1 in (1.85 m) | 190 lb (86 kg) | Sr | Chattanooga, Tennessee |
| 4 | OF | Mason Turner | R/R | 6 ft 0 in (1.83 m) | 180 lb (82 kg) | Jr | Houma, Louisiana |
| 5 | OF | Wes Toups | L/R | 6 ft 0 in (1.83 m) | 175 lb (79 kg) | So | Thibodaux, Louisiana |
| 6 | INF | Garrett Felix | L/R | 5 ft 8 in (1.73 m) | 172 lb (78 kg) | So | Lafayette, Louisiana |
| 7 | OF | Basiel Williams (redshirt) | R/R | 6 ft 3 in (1.91 m) | 190 lb (86 kg) | So | Hammond, Louisiana |
| 8 | OF | Xane Washington (redshirt) | R/R | 6 ft 3 in (1.91 m) | 185 lb (84 kg) | Jr | Houma, Louisiana |
| 10 | INF | Jayden Kay | R/R | 6 ft 0 in (1.83 m) | 190 lb (86 kg) | So | Billings, Montana |
| 11 | OF | Donovan Hamilton (redshirt) | R/R | 6 ft 3 in (1.91 m) | 180 lb (82 kg) | Fr | Houston, Texas |
| 12 | RHP | Devin Desandro | R/R | 5 ft 10 in (1.78 m) | 175 lb (79 kg) | So | Thibodaux, Louisiana |
| 13 | OF | Dane Simon | R/R | 5 ft 11 in (1.8 m) | 180 lb (82 kg) | Sr | Destrehan, Louisiana |
| 15 | INF | Austin Cain | R/R | 6 ft 0 in (1.83 m) | 185 lb (84 kg) | Jr | St. Joseph, Illinois |
| 17 | RHP | Gavin Caly | R/R | 6 ft 2 in (1.88 m) | 175 lb (79 kg) | So | Orlando, Florida |
| 18 | C | Jaden Collura | L/R | 5 ft 10 in (1.78 m) | 205 lb (93 kg) | Fr | Hammond, Louisiana |
| 19 | LHP | Tyler Theriot | L/L | 6 ft 2 in (1.88 m) | 175 lb (79 kg) | Jr | Brusly, Louisiana |
| 20 | RHP | Nick Heckman | R/R | 5 ft 11 in (1.8 m) | 175 lb (79 kg) | Jr | Haughton, Louisiana |
| 21 | INF | Kody O'Connor | L/R | 6 ft 1 in (1.85 m) | 215 lb (98 kg) | So | Lebanon, Ohio |
| 22 | OF | Alec Paz | R/R | 6 ft 2 in (1.88 m) | 200 lb (91 kg) | Sr | Dallas, Texas |
| 23 | OF | Hunter LeBlanc | L/L | 6 ft 1 in (1.85 m) | 182 lb (83 kg) | Jr | Luling, Louisiana |
| 24 | RHP | Nick Hill | R/R | 6 ft 5 in (1.96 m) | 220 lb (100 kg) | Jr | Sugar Land, Texas |
| 25 | INF | Edgar Alvarez | L/R | 6 ft 4 in (1.93 m) | 225 lb (102 kg) | So | Orlando, Florida |
| 26 | OF | Tyler Large | R/R | 6 ft 3 in (1.91 m) | 197 lb (89 kg) | Fr | Kansas City, Missouri |
| 27 | OF | Garrett Urry | R/R | 6 ft 0 in (1.83 m) | 190 lb (86 kg) | So | Austin, Texas |
| 28 | RHP | Chase Gearing | R/R | 6 ft 6 in (1.98 m) | 185 lb (84 kg) | Jr | Troy, Michigan |
| 29 | INF | Parker Coddou | L/R | 6 ft 0 in (1.83 m) | 170 lb (77 kg) | So | Thibodaux, Louisiana |
| 30 | RHP | Evan Keith | R/R | 6 ft 1 in (1.85 m) | 195 lb (88 kg) | So | Vancleave, Mississippi |
| 31 | RHP | David Vidal Jr. | R/R | 6 ft 2 in (1.88 m) | 225 lb (102 kg) | Sr | Luling, Louisiana |
| 32 | INF | Keegan Sueltz | R/R | 6 ft 5 in (1.96 m) | 215 lb (98 kg) | Jr | The Colony, Texas |
| 33 | LHP | Dylan Bergeron | L/L | 6 ft 0 in (1.83 m) | 210 lb (95 kg) | Fr | Houma, Louisiana |
| 34 | C | Parker Serio | R/R | 6 ft 3 in (1.91 m) | 210 lb (95 kg) | So | New Orleans, Louisiana |
| 35 | RHP | Brandon Andrews | R/R | 6 ft 2 in (1.88 m) | 215 lb (98 kg) | Sr | Mebane, North Carolina |
| 36 | INF | Kyle Boudreaux | R/R | 5 ft 10 in (1.78 m) | 180 lb (82 kg) | Jr | Sugar Land, Texas |
| 37 | LHP | Luke Barbier | L/L | 5 ft 10 in (1.78 m) | 170 lb (77 kg) | So | Morgan City, Louisiana |
| 38 | RHP | Nico Saltaformaggio | R/R | 6 ft 1 in (1.85 m) | 200 lb (91 kg) | So | Destrehan, Louisiana |
| 39 | LHP | Bradley Ely | R/R | 6 ft 1 in (1.85 m) | 180 lb (82 kg) | Jr | Frisco, Texas |
| 40 | INF | Ephraim Bravo | R/R | 6 ft 1 in (1.85 m) | 180 lb (82 kg) | Fr | Hialeah, Florida |
| 41 | C | Austin Trahan | R/R | 5 ft 11 in (1.8 m) | 190 lb (86 kg) | Jr | New Iberia, Louisiana |
| 42 | LHP | Josh Mancuso | L/L | 6 ft 6 in (1.98 m) | 225 lb (102 kg) | Jr | Anderson, Texas |
| 43 | C | Vinnie Bosio | R/R | 6 ft 0 in (1.83 m) | 190 lb (86 kg) | Fr | Mobile, Alabama |
| 44 | OF | Julian Hamilton | L/R | 6 ft 2 in (1.88 m) | 185 lb (84 kg) | Fr | Houston, Texas |
| 45 | RHP | Trent Hillen | R/R | 6 ft 3 in (1.91 m) | 225 lb (102 kg) | Fr | Morgan City, Louisiana |
| 46 | C | Lucas Hatch | R/R | 5 ft 10 in (1.78 m) | 180 lb (82 kg) | Jr | Berwick, Louisiana |
| 47 | LHP | Parker Morgan | L/L | 6 ft 1 in (1.85 m) | 180 lb (82 kg) | Fr | Lake Charles, Louisiana |

Head coach

Mike Silva (East Central)

Assistant coach(es)

Ladd Rhodes (Southern Mississippi)
Cody Livingston (Southern Mississippi)
Gabe Woods (Southeastern Louisiana)

Legend

- (C) Team captain
- (S) Suspended
- (I) Ineligible
- Injured
- Current redshirt

Roster
Last update: 12 April 2022

== Schedule and results ==
Legend
| | Nicholls win |
| | Nicholls loss |
| | Postponement/Cancelation/Suspensions |
| **Bold** | Nicholls team member |

2022 Nicholls Colonels baseball game log
Regular season (25–23)

February (4–4)
| Date | Opponent | Rank | Site/stadium | Score | Win | Loss | Save | TV | Attendance | Overall record | SLC Record |
|---|---|---|---|---|---|---|---|---|---|---|---|
| Feb. 18 | Missouri | | Ben Meyer Diamond at Ray E. Didier Field • Thibodaux, LA | **L** 1–12^{7} | Miles (1-0) | **Saltaformaggio** (0-1) | Potthoff (1) | | 344 | 0–1 | |
| Feb. 19 | Missouri | | Ben Meyer Diamond at Ray E. Didier Field • Thibodaux, LA | **L** 2–14^{7} | Troesser (1-0) | **Theriot** (0-1) | Landry (1) | | 301 | 0–2 | |
| Feb. 20 | Missouri | | Ben Meyer Diamond at Ray E. Didier Field • Thibodaux, LA | **W** 9–8 | **Gearing** (1-0) | Neubeck (0-1) | None | | 401 | 1–2 | |
| Feb. 21 | Missouri | | Ben Meyer Diamond at Ray E. Didier Field • Thibodaux, LA | **L** 4–7 | Cheeley (1-0) | **Keith** (0-1) | None | | 278 | 1–3 | |
| Feb. 23 | Tulane | | Ben Meyer Diamond at Ray E. Didier Field • Thibodaux, LA | **L** 5–7 | Siegel (1-0) | **Barbier** (0-1) | Devito (1) | | 543 | 1–4 | |
| Feb. 25 | Mississippi Valley State | | Ben Meyer Diamond at Ray E. Didier Field • Thibodaux, LA | **W** 11–1^{8} | **Saltaformaggio** (1-1) | McClendon (0-1) | None | | 133 | 2–4 | |
| Feb. 26 | Mississippi Valley State | | Ben Meyer Diamond at Ray E. Didier Field • Thibodaux, LA | **W** 10–0^{7} | **Theriot** (1-1) | Valenzuela (1-1) | None | | 301 | 3–4 | |
| Feb. 27 | Mississippi Valley State | | Ben Meyer Diamond at Ray E. Didier Field • Thibodaux, LA | **W** 16–10 | **Desandro** (1-0) | Stallings (0-1) | None | | 222 | 4–4 | |

March (10–5)
| Date | Opponent | Rank | Site/stadium | Score | Win | Loss | Save | TV | Attendance | Overall record | SLC Record |
|---|---|---|---|---|---|---|---|---|---|---|---|
| Mar. 1 | Louisiana Tech | | Ben Meyer Diamond at Ray E. Didier Field • Thibodaux, LA | **W** 5–4 | **Vial Jr.** (1-0) | Gibson (1-1) | **Evans** (1) | | 225 | 5–4 | |
| Mar. 2 | at Jackson State | | Braddy Field • Jackson, MS | **L** 3–9 | Huerta (1-0) | **Galy** (0-1) | None | | 75 | 5–5 | |
| Mar. 4 | at Memphis | | FedExPark • Memphis, TN | **W** 14–8 | **Gearing** (2-0) | Gilmore (0-1) | **Evans** (2) | | 317 | 6–5 | |
| Mar. 5 | at Memphis | | FedExField • Memphis, TN | **W** 14–9 | **Theriot** (2-1) | Fowler (0-1) | **Heckman** (1) | | 338 | 7–5 | |
| Mar. 6 | at Memphis | | FedExField • Memphis, TN | **L** 6–9 | Kendrick (2-0) | **Desandro** (1-1) | None | | 283 | 7–6 | |
| Mar. 9 | St. Thomas | | Ben Meyer Diamond at Ray E. Didier Field • Thibodaux, LA | **W** 10–0^{7} | **Mancuso** (1-0) | Odongo (0-2) | None | | 103 | 8–6 | |
| Mar. 11 | Louisiana–Monroe | | Ben Meyer Diamond at Ray E. Didier Field • Thibodaux, LA | **L** 8–10 | Barlow (1-1) | **Gearing** (2-1) | Orton (1) | | 406 | 8–7 | |
| Mar. 12 | Louisiana–Monroe | | Ben Meyer Diamond at Ray E. Didier Field • Thibodaux, LA | **W** 5–2 | **Theriot** (3-1) | Goleman (0-1) | **Evans** (3) | | 201 | 9–7 | |
| Mar. 13 | Louisiana–Monroe | | Ben Meyer Diamond at Ray E. Didier Field • Thibodaux, LA | **L** 1–2 | Lien (1-1) | **Heckman** (0-1) | Wepf (1) | | 311 | 9–8 | |
| Mar. 16 | at Tulane | | Greer Field at Turchin Stadium • New Orleans, LA | **L** 3–5 | Welch (2-0) | **Desandro** (1-2) | Devito (3) | ESPN+ | 1,510 | 9–9 | |
| Mar. 23 | Louisiana | | Ben Meyer Diamond at Ray E. Didier Field • Thibodaux, LA | **W** 6–5 | **Evans** (1-0) | Schultz (1-2) | None | | 634 | 10–9 | |
| Mar. 25 | at Southeastern Louisiana | | Pat Kenelly Diamond at Alumni Field • Hammond, LA | **W** 6–4 | **Andrews** (1-0) | Trahan (1-1) | **Evans** (4) | ESPN+ | 1,224 | 11–9 | 1–0 |
| Mar. 26 | at Southeastern Louisiana | | Pat Kenelly Diamond at Alumni Field • Hammond, LA | **W** 11–4 | **Gearing** (3-1) | O'Toole (1-3) | None | ESPN+ | 1,172 | 12–9 | 2–0 |
| Mar. 27 | at Southeastern Louisiana | | Pat Kenelly Diamond at Alumni Field • Hammond, LA | **W** 10–7 | **Heckman** (1-1) | Robb (0-3) | **Desandro** (1) | ESPN+ | 1,229 | 13–9 | 3–0 |
| Mar. 29 | Lamar | | Ben Meyer Diamond at Ray E. Didier Field • Thibodaux, LA | **W** 5–2 | **Mancuso** (2-0) | Odom (0-3) | **Vial Jr.** (1) | | 493 | 14–9 | |

April (10–6)
| Date | Opponent | Rank | Site/stadium | Score | Win | Loss | Save | TV | Attendance | Overall record | SLC Record |
|---|---|---|---|---|---|---|---|---|---|---|---|
| Apr. 1 | McNeese State | | Ben Meyer Diamond at Ray E. Didier Field • Thibodaux, LA | **L** 0–2 | Rogers (3-2) | **Theriot** (3-2) | Foster (8) | | 601 | 14–10 | 3–1 |
| Apr. 2 | McNeese State | | Ben Meyer Diamond at Ray E. Didier Field • Thibodaux, LA | **L** 1–5 | Vega (2-1) | **Gearing** (3-2) | None | | 504 | 14–11 | 3–2 |
| Apr. 3 | McNeese State | | Ben Meyer Diamond at Ray E. Didier Field • Thibodaux, LA | **W** 8–7^{10} | **Andrews** (2-0) | Foster (1-1) | None | | 421 | 15–11 | 4–2 |
| Apr. 6 | Jackson State | | Ben Meyer Diamond at Ray E. Didier Field • Thibodaux, LA | **W** 9–6 | **Gearing** (4-2) | Valdez (1-2) | None | | 391 | 16–11 | |
| Apr. 8 | at Houston Baptist | | Husky Field • Houston, TX | **W** 11–1^{7} | **Theriot** (4-2) | Ripoll (1-3) | None | ESPN+ | 201 | 17–11 | 5–2 |
| Apr. 9 | at Houston Baptist | | Husky Field • Houston, TX | **L** 5–6 | Reitmeyer (2-2) | **Andrews** (2-1) | None | ESPN+ | 378 | 17–12 | 5–3 |
| Apr. 10 | at Houston Baptist | | Husky Field • Houston, TX | **L** 2—9 | Spinney (2-3) | **Heckman** (1-2) | None | ESPN+ | 311 | 17–13 | 5–4 |
| Apr. 12 | at Southern | | Lee–Hines Field • Baton Rouge, LA | Game cancelled due to poor weather conditions | | | | | | | |
| Apr. 14 | Northwestern State | | Ben Meyer Diamond at Ray E. Didier Field • Thibodaux, LA | **W** 8–2 | **Desandro** (2-2) | Carver (3-4) | **Gearing** (1) | | 511 | 18–13 | 6–4 |
| Apr. 15 | Northwestern State | | Ben Meyer Diamond at Ray E. Didier Field • Thibodaux, LA | **W** 6–0 | **Theriot** (5-2) | Harmon (4-4) | None | | 215 | 19–13 | 7–4 |
| Apr. 16 | Northwestern State | | Ben Meyer Diamond at Ray E. Didier Field • Thibodaux, LA | **L** 7–10 | Brown (4-3) | **Heckman** (1-3) | None | | 287 | 19–14 | 7–5 |
| Apr. 19 | Southern | | Ben Meyer Diamond at Ray E. Didier Field • Thibodaux, LA | **W** 3–0 | **Saltaformaggio** (2-1) | Davis (1-3) | **Andrews** (1) | | 287 | 20–14 | |
| Apr. 22 | at Incarnate Word | | Sullivan Field • San Antonio, TX | **L** 4–11 | Garza (4-3) | **Desandro** (2-3) | None | | 227 | 20–15 | 7–6 |
| Apr. 23 | at Incarnate Word | | Sullivan Field • San Antonio, TX | **W** 5–3 | **Theriot** (6-2) | Cassidy (0-2) | **Gearing** (2) | | 253 | 21–15 | 8–6 |
| Apr. 24 | at Incarnate Word | | Sullivan Field • San Antonio, TX | **W** 8–7 | **Saltaformaggio** (3-1) | Celestino (3-3) | **Gearing** (3) | | 247 | 22–15 | 9–6 |
| Apr. 29 | New Orleans | | Ben Meyer Diamond at Ray E. Didier Field • Thibodaux, LA | **W** 12–2^{8} | **Desandro** (3-3) | LeBlanc (6-1) | None | | 439 | 23–15 | 10–6 |
| Apr. 30 | New Orleans | | Ben Meyer Diamond at Ray E. Didier Field • Thibodaux, LA | **W** 6–4 | **Theriot** (7-2) | Mitchell (1-6) | **Gearing** (4) | | 411 | 24–15 | 11–6 |

May (1–8)
| Date | Opponent | Rank | Site/stadium | Score | Win | Loss | Save | TV | Attendance | Overall record | SLC Record |
|---|---|---|---|---|---|---|---|---|---|---|---|
| May 1 | New Orleans | | Ben Meyer Diamond at Ray E. Didier Field • Thibodaux, LA | **L** 2–6 | Khachadourian (4-2) | **Heckman** (1-4) | Williams (1) | | 402 | 24–16 | 11–7 |
| May 3 | at No. 20 LSU | | Alex Box Stadium, Skip Bertman Field • Baton Rouge, LA | **L** 6–10 | Hasty (0-1) | **Mancuso** (2-1) | None | SECN+ | 10,856 | 24–17 | |
| May 6 | at Texas A&M–Corpus Christi | | Chapman Field • Corpus Christi, TX | **L** 6–7 | Shy (1-0) | **Gearing** (4-3) | None | | 370 | 24–18 | 11–8 |
| May 7 | at Texas A&M–Corpus Christi | | Chapman Field • Corpus Christi, TX | **L** 4–5 | Garcia (5-3) | **Theriot** (7-3) | Bird (2) | | 319 | 24–19 | 11–9 |
| May 8 | at Texas A&M–Corpus Christi | | Chapman Field • Corpus Christi, TX | **L** 10–11 | Sieve (0-1) | **Heckman** (1-5) | None | | 301 | 24–20 | 11–10 |
| May 12 | Southeastern Louisiana | | Ben Meyer Diamond at Ray E. Didier Field • Thibodaux, LA | **L** 2–3 | Kinzeler (4-1) | **Desandro** (3-4) | None | | 588 | 24–21 | 11–11 |
| May 14 | Southeastern Louisiana | | Ben Meyer Diamond at Ray E. Didier Field • Thibodaux, LA | **L** 6–8 | Robb (4-3) | **Theriot** (7-4) | Trahan (10) | | 337 | 24–22 | 11–12 |
| May 14 | Southeastern Louisiana | | Ben Meyer Diamond at Ray E. Didier Field • Thibodaux, LA | **W** 4–3^{11} | **Heckman** (2-5) | Dugas (3-2) | None | | 337 | 25–22 | 12–12 |
| May 17 | at Louisiana | | M. L. Tigue Moore Field at Russo Park • Lafayette, LA | **L** 1–6 | Menard (5-1) | **Galy** (0-2) | None | ESPN+ | 4,052 | 25–23 | |

Postseason (1–2)

Southland Tournament (1–2)
| Date | Opponent | (Seed)/Rank | Site/stadium | Score | Win | Loss | Save | TV | Attendance | Overall record | Tournament record |
|---|---|---|---|---|---|---|---|---|---|---|---|
| May 19 | vs. (5) Northwestern State | (4) | Joe Miller Ballpark • Lake Charles, LA | **W** 7–6 | **Gearing** (5-3) | Carver (4-5) | None | ESPN+ | 348 | 26–23 | 1–0 |
| May 20 | vs. (1) McNeese State | (4) | Joe Miller Ballpark • Lake Charles, LA | **L** 4–8 | Jones (4-0) | **Theriot** (7-5) | Foster (12) | ESPN+ | 678 | 26–24 | 1–1 |
| May 21 | vs. (8) Incarnate Word | (4) | Joe Miller Ballpark • Lake Charles, LA | **L** 8–9 | Hayward (2-7) | **Vial Jr.** (1-1) | None | ESPN+ | 336 | 26–25 | 1–2 |

Schedule source:

*Rankings are based on the team's current ranking in the D1Baseball poll.
