= 2019 Southland Conference baseball tournament =

Postseason collegiate baseball tournament

- Teams: 8
- Format: Double-elimination
- Finals site: Constellation Field; Sugar Land, Texas
- Champions: McNeese State (3rd title)
- Winning coach: Justin Hill (1st title)
- Television: ESPN+

2019 Southland Conference baseball standings
	Conf.				Overall
Team	W		L	PCT	W		L	PCT
Sam Houston State ‍†‍‍	20	–	10	.667	31	–	25	.554
Southeastern Louisiana ‍‍‍	19	–	11	.633	33	–	27	.550
Central Arkansas ‍‍‍	19	–	11	.633	32	–	27	.542
Incarnate Word ‍‍‍	18	–	12	.600	37	–	22	.627
McNeese State ‍‍‡‍^{y}	16	–	14	.533	35	–	26	.574
Stephen F. Austin ‍‍‍	16	–	14	.533	25	–	33	.431
Northwestern State ‍‍‍	15	–	15	.500	30	–	25	.545
Texas A&M–Corpus Christi ‍‍‍	14	–	16	.467	31	–	26	.544
New Orleans ‍‍‍	13	–	17	.433	29	–	27	.518
Abilene Christian ‍‍‍	13	–	17	.433	26	–	26	.500
Nicholls ‍‍‍	13	–	17	.433	27	–	28	.491
Houston Baptist ‍‍‍	10	–	20	.333	18	–	35	.340
Lamar ‍‍‍	9	–	21	.300	18	–	36	.333
† – Conference champion ‡ – Tournament champion y – Invited to the NCAA tournament As of June 5, 2019; Rankings from D1Baseball

The 2019 Southland Conference baseball tournament was held from May 23 through 25. The top eight regular season finishers of the league's thirteen teams met in the double-elimination tournament held at Constellation Field in Sugar Land, Texas. The winner of the tournament, McNeese State, earned the conference's automatic bid to the 2019 NCAA Division I baseball tournament.

== Seeding and format ==
The top eight finishers from the regular season were seeded one through eight. They played a two bracket, double-elimination tournament, with the winner of each bracket meeting in a single championship final.

== Results ==
First round
1	Sam Houston State	1
8	Texas A&M–Corpus Christi	2
4	Incarnate Word	1
5	McNeese State	2
1	Sam Houston State	2
4	Incarnate Word	3
3	Southeastern Louisiana	0
6	Stephen F. Austin	5
2	Central Arkansas	2
7	Northwestern State	0
3	Southeastern Louisiana	6
7	Northwestern State	4

Second round
8	Texas A&M–Corpus Christi	2
5	McNeese State	7
4	Incarnate Word	5
8	Texas A&M–Corpus Christi	4
6	Stephen F. Austin	0
2	Central Arkansas	11
3	Southeastern Louisiana	4
6	Stephen F. Austin	3

Semifinals
5	McNeese State	5
4	Incarnate Word	4
2	Central Arkansas	3	6
3	Southeastern Louisiana	9	3^{10}

Finals
5	McNeese State	4
2	Central Arkansas	2

== Conference championship ==
Southland Conference Championship
(2) Central Arkansas Bears	vs.	(5) McNeese State Cowboys

May 25, 2019, 6:00 p.m. (CDT) at Constellation Field in Sugar Land, Texas
Team	1	2	3	4	5	6	7	8	9	R	H	E
(2) Central Arkansas	0	0	0	1	0	0	0	1	0	2	6	2
(5) McNeese State	0	0	0	1	0	0	3	0	X	4	12	1
WP: Aidan Anderson (7–6) LP: Tanner Wiley (1–2) Sv: Will Dion (6); Attendance: 1,189
