= 2022 Southland Conference baseball tournament =

- Teams: 8
- Format: Double-elimination
- Finals site: Pat Kenelly Diamond at Alumni Field; Hammond, LA
- Champions: Southeastern Louisiana (2nd title)
- Winning coach: Matt Riser (2nd title)
- MVP: Preston Faulkner (Southeastern Louisiana)
- Television: ESPN+

2022 Southland Conference baseball standings
	Conf.				Overall
Team	W		L	PCT	W		L	PCT
McNeese State ‍†‍‍	15	–	9	.625	34	–	23	.596
Southeastern Louisiana ‍‍‡‍^{y}	14	–	10	.583	30	–	29	.508
New Orleans ‍‍‍	13	–	11	.542	30	–	23	.566
Nicholls ‍‍‍	12	–	12	.500	26	–	25	.510
Northwestern State ‍‍‍	12	–	12	.500	25	–	29	.463
Houston Baptist ‍‍‍	11	–	13	.458	18	–	36	.333
Texas A&M–Corpus Christi ‍‍‍	10	–	14	.417	27	–	28	.491
Incarnate Word ‍‍‍	9	–	15	.375	21	–	31	.404
† – Conference champion ‡ – Tournament champion y – Invited to the NCAA tournament As of March 12, 2025; Rankings from D1Baseball

The 2022 Southland Conference baseball tournament was held from May 19 through 21 and May 26 to 28. The top eight regular season finishers of the league's thirteen teams met in the double-elimination tournament. McNeese State and Southeastern Louisiana were the top two seeds in the conference, so all first-round games were played at Joe Miller Ballpark in Lake Charles, Louisiana, and Pat Kenelly Diamond at Alumni Field in Hammond, Louisiana. The finals were held Miller Park in Lake Charles.

Southeastern Louisiana won the tournament and earned the conference's automatic bid to the Auburn Regional of the 2022 NCAA Division I baseball tournament.

== Seeding and format ==
The top eight finishers from the regular season were seeded one through eight, and played a two bracket, double-elimination tournament, with #1 McNeese and #2 Southeastern Louisiana each winning their brackets and meeting in a best of three series. Southeastern took the conference championship two games to one to advance the NCAA tournament.

== Results ==
First round	Quarterfinals
1	McNeese State	12
8	Incarnate Word	6
1	McNeese State	8
4	Nicholls	4
4	Nicholls	7
5	Northwestern State	6
Joe Miller Ballpark – Lake Charles, LA
8	Incarnate Word	14
5	Northwestern State	10
8	Incarnate Word	9
4	Nicholls	8
3	New Orleans	10
6	Houston Baptist	3
3	New Orleans	10
7	Texas A&M–Corpus Christi	9
2	Southeastern Louisiana	5
7	Texas A&M–Corpus Christi	6
Pat Kenelly Diamond at Alumni Field – Hammond, LA
6	Houston Baptist	4
2	Southeastern Louisiana	12
2	Southeastern Louisiana	18
7	Texas A&M–Corpus Christi	11

Semifinals
1	McNeese State	7	–
8	Incarnate Word	2	–
3	New Orleans	4	3
2	Southeastern Louisiana	25^{7}	4^{10}

Finals
1	McNeese State	6	2	7
2	Southeastern Louisiana	5^{12}	3	11
