= 2022 Texas A&M–Corpus Christi Islanders baseball team =

American college baseball season

2022 Texas A&M–Corpus Christi Islanders baseball
- Conference: Southland Conference
- Record: 27–28 (10–14 Southland)
- Head coach: Scott Malone (15th season)
- Assistant coaches: Marty Smith; Seth LaRue
- Home stadium: Chapman Field

2022 Southland Conference baseball standings
	Conf.				Overall
Team	W		L	PCT	W		L	PCT
McNeese State ‍†‍‍	15	–	9	.625	34	–	23	.596
Southeastern Louisiana ‍‍‡‍^{y}	14	–	10	.583	30	–	29	.508
New Orleans ‍‍‍	13	–	11	.542	30	–	23	.566
Nicholls ‍‍‍	12	–	12	.500	26	–	25	.510
Northwestern State ‍‍‍	12	–	12	.500	25	–	29	.463
Houston Baptist ‍‍‍	11	–	13	.458	18	–	36	.333
Texas A&M–Corpus Christi ‍‍‍	10	–	14	.417	27	–	28	.491
Incarnate Word ‍‍‍	9	–	15	.375	21	–	31	.404
† – Conference champion ‡ – Tournament champion y – Invited to the NCAA tournament Rankings from D1Baseball

The 2022 Texas A&M–Corpus Christi Islanders baseball team represented Texas A&M University–Corpus Christi during the 2022 NCAA Division I baseball season. The Islanders played their home games at Chapman Field and were led by fifteenth–year head coach Scott Malone. They were members of the Southland Conference.

== Preseason ==
=== Southland Conference Coaches Poll ===
The Southland Conference Coaches Poll is to be released in the winter of 2022.

Coaches poll
Predicted finish	Team	Votes (1st place)
1	Southeastern Louisiana	93 (10)
2	McNeese State	80 (3)
3	New Orleans	73
4	Texas A&M–Corpus Christi	63 (1)
5	Northwestern State	55 (2)
6	Incarnate Word	36
T-7	Houston Baptist	24
T-7	Nicholls	24

=== Preseason All-Southland Team & Honors ===
==== First Team ====
- Hayden Thomas – Pitcher
- Josh Caraway – Utility

==== Second Team ====
- Justin Taylor – Catcher
- Brendan Ryan – Outfielder
- Jaime Ramirez – Pitcher

== Personnel ==
2022 Texas A&M–Corpus Christi Islanders baseball team
Players
Coaches

#	Pos.	Name	B/T	Height	Weight	Year	Home town
1	INF	Tyler Linneweber	/	5 ft 8 in (1.73 m)	160 lb (73 kg)	So	Conroe, Texas
2	OF	Nick Mueller	L/L	6 ft 1 in (1.85 m)	175 lb (79 kg)	So	League City, Texas
3	LHP	Tre Jones	L/L	6 ft 2 in (1.88 m)	195 lb (88 kg)	So	Houston, Texas
4	INF	Diego Johnson	R/R	5 ft 10 in (1.78 m)	170 lb (77 kg)	So	Carrollton, Texas
5	INF	Tucker McEnroe	R/R	6 ft 1 in (1.85 m)	190 lb (86 kg)	So	Spring, Texas
6	RHP	JT Moeller	/	6 ft 1 in (1.85 m)	180 lb (82 kg)	So	San Antonio, Texas
7	RHP	Henry Bird	R/R	6 ft 2 in (1.88 m)	195 lb (88 kg)	Sr	Alvin, Texas
9	LHP	Dom Lopez	L/L	5 ft 9 in (1.75 m)	190 lb (86 kg)	So	Corpus Christi, Texas
10	INF	Brendan Ryan	L/R	6 ft 0 in (1.83 m)	185 lb (84 kg)	Jr	Leawood, Kansas
11	INF	Steven Rivera-Chijin	L/R	6 ft 0 in (1.83 m)	200 lb (91 kg)	Sr	Toa Baja, Puerto Rico
13	C	Josh Caraway	R/R	6 ft 1 in (1.85 m)	216 lb (98 kg)	So	Roanoke, Texas
14	OF	Cole Modgling	/	5 ft 7 in (1.7 m)	165 lb (75 kg)	Fr	Castroville, Texas
15	RHP	Colin Purcell	R/R	6 ft 4 in (1.93 m)	185 lb (84 kg)	So	Tomball, Texas
16	INF	John Maldonado Jr.	/	6 ft 0 in (1.83 m)	190 lb (86 kg)	Fr	Kaufman, Texas
17	RHP	Marco Gutierrez	/	5 ft 10 in (1.78 m)	195 lb (88 kg)	Fr	Manvel, Texas
18	INF	Leo Markotic	R/R	5 ft 11 in (1.8 m)	190 lb (86 kg)	Jr	Toronto, Canada
19	LHP	Kyle Dickey	/	6 ft 1 in (1.85 m)	170 lb (77 kg)	Fr	Cypress, Texas
20	C	Chance Reisdorph	/	6 ft 2 in (1.88 m)	195 lb (88 kg)	Fr	New Braunfels, Texas
21	C	Justin Taylor	R/R	6 ft 0 in (1.83 m)	190 lb (86 kg)	Jr	Dripping Springs, Texas
22	LHP	Jaime Ramirez Jr.	L/L	5 ft 10 in (1.78 m)	190 lb (86 kg)	So	San Antonio, Texas
23	INF	Nate White	R/R	6 ft 0 in (1.83 m)	190 lb (86 kg)	So	Arlington, Texas
24	LHP	Cassius Shy	L/L	6 ft 6 in (1.98 m)	200 lb (91 kg)	Sr	Las Vegas, Nevada
25	INF	Max Puls	/	6 ft 0 in (1.83 m)	195 lb (88 kg)	So	Palm Desert, Texas
26	RHP	Dylan Johnson	R/R	5 ft 10 in (1.78 m)	175 lb (79 kg)	So	San Antonio, Texas
27	RHP	Sean Sieve	/R	6 ft 2 in (1.88 m)	180 lb (82 kg)	So	Granbury, Texas
28	C	Tyler Byrd	R/R	6 ft 0 in (1.83 m)	210 lb (95 kg)	So	Atascocita, Texas
29	RHP	Clay Westbrook	/	6 ft 1 in (1.85 m)	200 lb (91 kg)	Fr	Spring, Texas
30	LHP	Zach Garcia	/	6 ft 2 in (1.88 m)	190 lb (86 kg)	Fr	New Braunfels, Texas
31	RHP	Leo Perez	R/R	6 ft 1 in (1.85 m)	240 lb (109 kg)	Sr	Palmview, Texas
32	LHP	Justin Lewis	L/L	6 ft 0 in (1.83 m)	215 lb (98 kg)	Jr	Sachse, Texas
33	RHP	Daniel Nelson	R/R	6 ft 3 in (1.91 m)	195 lb (88 kg)	Sr	Crosby, Texas
34	RHP	Hayden Thomas	R/R	6 ft 1 in (1.85 m)	190 lb (86 kg)	Jr	Leander, Texas
35	RHP	Sebastian Mejia	R/R	5 ft 11 in (1.8 m)	186 lb (84 kg)	So	Humble, Texas
36	RHP	Tyler Miller	R/R	6 ft 7 in (2.01 m)	215 lb (98 kg)	Jr	Houston, Texas
38	INF	Wesley Mitchell	R/R	6 ft 3 in (1.91 m)	190 lb (86 kg)	So	Katy, Texas
39	OF	Brandon Petkoff	L/L	6 ft 1 in (1.85 m)	185 lb (84 kg)	So	Frankfort, Illinois
40	OF	Caden Queck	R/R	6 ft 2 in (1.88 m)	200 lb (91 kg)	So	The Woodlands, Texas
41	RHP	Kennedy Parks	/R	5 ft 9 in (1.75 m)	185 lb (84 kg)	So	Lexington, Kentucky
42	C	Jared Harris	/	6 ft 0 in (1.83 m)	190 lb (86 kg)	So	Tomball, Texas
43	RHP	Trace Blue	R/R	6 ft 3 in (1.91 m)	205 lb (93 kg)	So	Fulshear, Texas
44	OF	Trevor Davis	R/R	6 ft 5 in (1.96 m)	230 lb (104 kg)	Jr	Mesquite, Texas
45	RHP	David Hankins	R/R	6 ft 4 in (1.93 m)	178 lb (81 kg)	So	Katy, Texas
46	INF	Jacob Ruiz	/	6 ft 0 in (1.83 m)	190 lb (86 kg)	Fr	Eagle Pass, Texas
47	OF	Carson Winkler	R/R	6 ft 0 in (1.83 m)	175 lb (79 kg)	So	Magnolia, Texas

Head coach

Scott Malone (McMurray)

Assistant coach(es)

Marty Smith (Hardin–Simmons)
Seth LaRue (Campbell)

Legend

- (C) Team captain
- (S) Suspended
- (I) Ineligible
- Injured
- Current redshirt

Roster
Last update: 7 January 2022

== Schedule and results ==
Legend
	Texas A&M–Corpus Christi win
	Texas A&M–Corpus Christi loss
	Postponement/Cancelation/Suspensions
**Bold**	Texas A&M–Corpus Christi team member

2022 Texas A&M–Corpus Christi Islanders baseball game log
Regular season (26–26)

February (5–4)
Date	Opponent	Rank	Site/stadium	Score	Win	Loss	Save	TV	Attendance	Overall record	SLC Record
Feb. 18	at UT Arlington		Clay Gould Ballpark • Arlington, TX	**W** 4–3	**Ramirez Jr.** (1-0)	Moffat (0-1)	**Nelson** (1)		427	1–0	
Feb. 19	at UT Arlington		Clay Gould Ballpark • Arlington, TX	**W** 6–2	**Garcia** (1-0)	King (0-1)	None		549	2–0	
Feb. 20	at UT Arlington		Clay Gould Ballpark • Arlington, TX	**L** 7–9	Bailey (1-0)	**Bird** (0-1)	None		534	2–1	
Feb. 22	No. 1 Texas		Whataburger Field • Corpus Christi, TX	**L** 0–12	Duplantier II (1-0)	**Thomas** (0-1)	None		4,372	2–2	
Feb. 23	Texas		Whataburger Field • Corpus Christi, TX	**L** 4–5	Blair (1-0)	**Garcia** (1-1)	Nixon (1)		1,743	2–3	
Kleberg Bank Classic
Feb. 25	Wichita State		Whataburger Field • Corpus Christi, TX	**W** 5–3	**Westbrook** (1-0)	Favors (0-1)	None		704	3–3	
Feb. 26	Iowa		Whataburger Field • Corpus Christi, TX	**W** 2–1^{11}	**Bird** (1-0)	Davitt (0-1)	None		631	4–3	
Feb. 27	Pepperdine		Whataburger Field • Corpus Christi, TX	**L** 5–7	Baird (3-0)	**Parks** (0-1)	Georges (1)		724	4–4	
Feb. 28	Pepperdine		Chapman Field • Corpus Christi, TX	**W** 10–4	**Thomas** (1-1)	Diamond (0-1)	None	ESPN+	296	5–4	

March (10–8)
Date	Opponent	Rank	Site/stadium	Score	Win	Loss	Save	TV	Attendance	Overall record	SLC Record
Mar. 1	Prairie View A&M		Chapman Field • Corpus Christi, TX	**W** 7–0	**Shy** (1-0)	Denker (0-1)	None		322	6–4	
Mar. 4	Stephen F. Austin		Chapman Field • Corpus Christi, TX	**L** 6–9^{10}	Poell (1-1)	**Moeller** (0-1)	Caple (1)		385	6–5	
Mar. 5	Stephen F. Austin		Chapman Field • Corpus Christi, TX	**W** 9–4	**Perez** (1-0)	Todd (0-2)	**Garcia** (1)		382	7–5	
Mar. 6	Stephen F. Austin		Chapman Field • Corpus Christi, TX	**W** 12–11^{10}	**Gutierrez** (1-0)	Poell (1-2)	None	ESPN+	336	8–5	
South Texas Showdown
Mar. 8	at Texas–Rio Grande Valley		UTRGV Baseball Stadium • Edinburg, TX	**L** 0–4	Bridges (1-0)	**Shy** (1-1)	None		918	8–6	
Mar. 11	Prairie View A&M		Chapman Field • Corpus Christi, TX	**W** 9–8	**Garcia** (2-1)	Tubbs (0-1)	None		323	9–6	
Mar. 12	Prairie View A&M		Chapman Field • Corpus Christi, TX	**L** 4–5	Mendoza (1-2)	**Perez** (1-1)	Maxcey (1)		395	9–7	
Mar. 13	Prairie View A&M		Chapman Field • Corpus Christi, TX	**W** 12–0^{7}	**Thomas** (2-1)	Krall (0-1)	None		352	10–7	
Mar. 15	at No. 21 TCU		Lupton Stadium • Fort Worth, TX	**L** 6–17^{8}	Bolden (1-0)	**Westbrook** (1-1)	None		3,561	10–8	
Mar. 16	at Tarleton State		Cecil Ballow Baseball Complex • Stephenville, TX	**L** 8–9	Hickey (1-0)	**Sieve** (0-1)	None		504	10–9	
Mar. 18	at Nebraska		Haymarket Park • Lincoln, NE	**L** 12–13	Ornelas (2-0)	**Nelson** (0-1)	None		4,407	10–10	
Mar. 19	at Nebraska		Haymarket Park • Lincoln, NE	**W** 4–1	**Thomas** (3-1)	Schanaman (1-3)	**Garcia** (2)		5,446	11–10	
Mar. 20	at Nebraska		Haymarket Park • Lincoln, NE	**W** 21–4	**Perez** (2-1)	McCarville (2-2)	None		5,627	12–10	
Mar. 23	Lamar		Chapman Field • Corpus Christi, TX	**L** 2–7	Mize (1-0)	**Shy** (1-2)	None			12–11	
Mar. 25	Incarnate Word		Chapman Field • Corpus Christi, TX	**W** 12–2^{7}	**Miller** (1-0)	Garza (2-3)	None		401	13–11	1–0
Mar. 26	Incarnate Word		Chapman Field • Corpus Christi, TX	**W** 4–1	**Thomas** (4-1)	Zavala (1-3)	**Moeller** (1)	ESPN+	401	14–11	2–0
Mar. 27	Incarnate Word		Chapman Field • Corpus Christi, TX	**L** 4–7	David (1-0)	**Perez** (2-1)	None	ESPN+	309	14–12	2–1
Mar. 30	at Rice		Reckling Park • Houston, TX	**W** 12–10	**Purcell** (1-0)	Cienfuegos (0-1)	**Moeller** (2)		2,060	15–12	

April (5–13)
Date	Opponent	Rank	Site/stadium	Score	Win	Loss	Save	TV	Attendance	Overall record	SLC Record
Apr. 1	at Northwestern State		H. Alvin Brown–C. C. Stroud Field • Natchitoches, LA	**L** 2–8	Carver (3-2)	**Garcia** (2-4)	None		519	15–13	2–2
Apr. 2	at Northwestern State		H. Alvin Brown–C. C. Stroud Field • Natchitoches, LA	**L** 8–11	Harmon (4-2)	**Thomas** (4-2)	Flowers (2)		555	15–14	2–3
Apr. 3	at Northwestern State		H. Alvin Brown–C. C. Stroud Field • Natchitoches, LA	**L** 0–1^{10}	Collins (1-0)	**Perez** (2-3)	None		576	15–15	2–4
Apr. 8	at Southeastern Louisiana		Pat Kenelly Diamond at Alumni Field • Hammond, LA	**W** 18–4^{7}	**Garcia** (3-4)	Kinzeler (2-1)	None		1,015	16–15	3–4
Apr. 9	at Southeastern Louisiana		Pat Kenelly Diamond at Alumni Field • Hammond, LA	**L** 9–12	Landry (2-3)	**Purcell** (1-1)	Trahan (4)		1,022	16–16	3–5
Apr. 10	at Southeastern Louisiana		Pat Kenelly Diamond at Alumni Field • Hammond, LA	**L** 3–7	Robb (2-3)	**Ramirez Jr.** (1-1)	None		1,007	16–17	3–6
Apr. 12	Texas A&M		Whataburger Field • Corpus Christi, TX	**L** 3–5	Menefee (1-2)	**Purcell** (1-2)	Palisch (1)		3,279	16–18	
Apr. 14	Houston Baptist		Chapman Field • Corpus Christi, TX	**W** 17–3^{7}	**Garcia** (4-2)	Ripoll (1-4)	None	ESPN+	344	17–18	4–6
Apr. 15	Houston Baptist		Chapman Field • Corpus Christi, TX	**L** 3–5	Zarella (1-0)	**Miller** (1-1)	Reitmeyer (7)	ESPN+	366	17–19	4–7
Apr. 16	Houston Baptist		Chapman Field • Corpus Christi, TX	**L** 5–11	Charles (2-0)	**Ramirez Jr.** (1-2)	None	ESPN+	319	17–20	4–8
Apr. 20	at Prairie View A&M		John W. Tankersley Field • Prairie View, TX	**W** 8–5^{10}	**Moeller** (1-1)	Curry (3-3)	None		145	18–20	
Apr. 22	at New Orleans		Maestri Field at Privateer Park • New Orleans, LA	**L** 3–13^{7}	LeBlanc (6-0)	**Garcia** (4-3)	None		600	18–21	4–9
Apr. 23	at New Orleans		Maestri Field at Privateer Park • New Orleans, LA	**W** 11–9	**Westbrook** (2-1)	Mitchell (1-5)	None		535	19–21	5–9
Apr. 24	at New Orleans		Maestri Field at Privateer Park • New Orleans, LA	**L** 6–14	Khachadourian (3-2)	**Mejia** (0-1)	None		244	19–22	5–10
South Texas Showdown
Apr. 27	Texas–Rio Grande Valley		Chapman Field • Corpus Christi, TX	**W** 12–5	**Westbrook** (3-1)	Verdugo (0-1)	None	ESPN+		20–22	
Apr. 29	McNeese State		Chapman Field • Corpus Christi, TX	**L** 2–7	Rogers (5-3)	**Thomas** (4-3)	None			20–23	5–11
Apr. 30	McNeese State		Chapman Field • Corpus Christi, TX	**L** 3–7	Stone (3-2)	**Purcell** (1-3)	Foster (11)	ESPN+	297	20–24	5–12

May (6–2)
Date	Opponent	Rank	Site/stadium	Score	Win	Loss	Save	TV	Attendance	Overall record	SLC Record
May 1	McNeese State		Chapman Field • Corpus Christi, TX	**W** 13–11	**Miller** (2-1)	Vega (2-4)	**Bird** (1)	ESPN+	306	21–24	6–12
May 4	Texas–Rio Grande Valley		Chapman Field • Corpus Christi, TX	**W** 18–3^{7}	**Shy** (2-2)	Cabral (1-1)	None			22–24	
May 6	Nicholls		Chapman Field • Corpus Christi, TX	**W** 7–6	**Shy** (3-2)	Gearing (4-3)	None		370	23–24	7–12
May 7	Nicholls		Chapman Field • Corpus Christi, TX	**W** 5–4	**Garcia** (5-3)	Theriot (7-3)	**Bird** (2)		319	24–24	8–12
May 8	Nicholls		Chapman Field • Corpus Christi, TX	**W** 11–10	**Sieve** (1-0)	Heckman (1-5)	None	ESPN+	301	25–24	9–12
May 12	at Incarnate Word		Sullivan Field • San Antonio, TX	**L** 3–13^{8}	Garza (5-4)	**Thomas** (4-4)	None		215	25–25	9–13
May 13	at Incarnate Word		Sullivan Field • San Antonio, TX	**L** 6–8	May (1-0)	**Bird** (1-2)	Hayward (2)		409	25–26	9–14
May 14	at Incarnate Word		Sullivan Field • San Antonio, TX	**W** 6–2	**Perez** (3-3)	Zavala (1-4)	**Mejia** (1)		212	26–26	10–14

Postseason (1–2)

Southland Tournament (1–2)
Date	Opponent	(Seed)/Rank	Site/stadium	Score	Win	Loss	Save	TV	Attendance	Overall record	Tournament record
May 19	vs. (2) Southeastern Louisiana	(7)	Pat Kenelly Diamond at Alumni Field • Hammond, LA	**W** 6–5	**Garcia** (6-3)	Kinzeler (4-2)	**Mejia** (2)	ESPN+	680	27–26	1–0
May 20	vs. (3) New Orleans	(7)	Pat Kenelly Diamond at Alumni Field • Hammond, LA	**L** 9–10	Williams (7-1)	**Thomas** (4-5)	Cunningham (1)	ESPN+	527	27–27	1–1
May 21	vs. (2) Southeastern Louisiana	(7)	Pat Kenelly Diamond at Alumni Field • Hammond, LA	**L** 11–18	Aspholm (1-0)	**Purcell** (1-4)	Trahan (11)	ESPN+	590	27–28	1–2

Schedule source:

*Rankings are based on the team's current ranking in the D1Baseball poll.
