= 2022 Houston Baptist Huskies baseball team =

American college baseball season

2022 Houston Baptist Huskies baseball
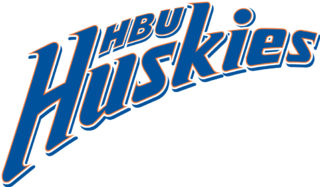
- Conference: Southland Conference
- Record: 18–36 (11–13 Southland)
- Head coach: Lance Berkman (1st season)
- Assistant coaches: Clay Vanderlaan; Tyler Bremer
- Home stadium: Husky Field

2022 Southland Conference baseball standings
	Conf.				Overall
Team	W		L	PCT	W		L	PCT
McNeese State ‍†‍‍	15	–	9	.625	34	–	23	.596
Southeastern Louisiana ‍‍‡‍^{y}	14	–	10	.583	30	–	29	.508
New Orleans ‍‍‍	13	–	11	.542	30	–	23	.566
Nicholls ‍‍‍	12	–	12	.500	26	–	25	.510
Northwestern State ‍‍‍	12	–	12	.500	25	–	29	.463
Houston Baptist ‍‍‍	11	–	13	.458	18	–	36	.333
Texas A&M–Corpus Christi ‍‍‍	10	–	14	.417	27	–	28	.491
Incarnate Word ‍‍‍	9	–	15	.375	21	–	31	.404
† – Conference champion ‡ – Tournament champion y – Invited to the NCAA tournament Rankings from D1Baseball

The 2022 Houston Baptist Huskies baseball team represented Houston Baptist University, now known as Houston Christian University, during the 2022 NCAA Division I baseball season. The Huskies played their home games at Husky Field and were led by first–year head coach Lance Berkman, former star player with the Houston Astros. They were members of the Southland Conference.

This was the last season for the Huskies under the Houston Baptist name. The university changed its name to Houston Christian University on September 21 of that year. The nickname of Huskies was not changed.

== Preseason ==
=== Southland Conference Coaches Poll ===
The Southland Conference Coaches Poll is to be released in the winter of 2022.

Coaches poll
Predicted finish	Team	Votes (1st place)
1	Southeastern Louisiana	93 (10)
2	McNeese State	80 (3)
3	New Orleans	73
4	Texas A&M–Corpus Christi	63 (1)
5	Northwestern State	55 (2)
6	Incarnate Word	36
T-7	Houston Baptist	24
T-7	Nicholls	24

=== Preseason All-Southland Team & Honors ===
==== First Team ====
- Daunte Stuart – 2nd Base
- Cal Carver – Pitcher

==== Second Team ====
- Donovan Ohnoutka – Pitcher
- Drayton Brown – Pitcher

== Personnel ==
2022 Houston Baptist Huskies baseball team
Players
Coaches

#	Pos.	Name	B/T	Height	Weight	Year	Home town
1	OF	Christian Dumont	R/R	5 ft 10 in (1.78 m)	175 lb (79 kg)	Sr	Bellevue, Nebraska
2	INF	Sebastian Trinidad	R/R	5 ft 11 in (1.8 m)	170 lb (77 kg)	So	Houston, Texas
3	C	Dawson Woods	L/R	6 ft 0 in (1.83 m)	200 lb (91 kg)	Jr	Corsicana, Texas
4	RHP	Tyler Zarella	R/R	5 ft 10 in (1.78 m)	175 lb (79 kg)	Jr	League City, Texas
5	RHP	Jordan Powell	R/R	5 ft 11 in (1.8 m)	185 lb (84 kg)	Jr	Montgomery, Texas
6	INF	Jake Miller	R/R	5 ft 10 in (1.78 m)	190 lb (86 kg)	Jr	Round Rock, Texas
7	INF	Austin Roccaforte	R/R	5 ft 8 in (1.73 m)	160 lb (73 kg)	Jr	Tomball, Texas
8	INF	Braden Sanford	R/R	5 ft 9 in (1.75 m)	180 lb (82 kg)	So	Santee, California
9	RHP	Chad Ricker	L/R	6 ft 1 in (1.85 m)	205 lb (93 kg)	Jr	Argyle, Texas
10	OF	Logan Letney	L/R	5 ft 10 in (1.78 m)	190 lb (86 kg)	Jr	Spring, Texas
11	INF	Diego Davila	R/R	5 ft 11 in (1.8 m)	180 lb (82 kg)	Jr	Spring, Texas
13	OF	Bernard Shivers	R/R	6 ft 1 in (1.85 m)	190 lb (86 kg)	Jr	Jersey City, New Jersey
14	OF	Jared Schatz	L/R	5 ft 8 in (1.73 m)	170 lb (77 kg)	Jr	Thousand Oaks, California
15	INF	Brennan Bales	R/R	6 ft 2 in (1.88 m)	205 lb (93 kg)	Jr	Nebraska City, Nebraska
16	RHP	Matthew Charles	R/R	5 ft 10 in (1.78 m)	180 lb (82 kg)	Jr	Houston, Texas
17	RHP	Morris Austin	R/R	6 ft 2 in (1.88 m)	200 lb (91 kg)	Jr	Keller, Texas
19	LHP	Bryce Toney	L/L	6 ft 0 in (1.83 m)	190 lb (86 kg)	Jr	Cypress, Texas
20	RHP	Jared Burch	R/R	6 ft 6 in (1.98 m)	225 lb (102 kg)	Sr	Houston, Texas
21	RHP	Blake Bolgiano	R/R	6 ft 1 in (1.85 m)	190 lb (86 kg)	Jr	Midlothian, Texas
22	RHP	Will Ripoll	R/R	6 ft 0 in (1.83 m)	180 lb (82 kg)	Jr	New Orleans, Louisiana
23	OF	Lane Botkin	L/R	6 ft 0 in (1.83 m)	195 lb (88 kg)	Sr	Columbia, South Carolina
24	C	Tyler LaRue	R/R	6 ft 2 in (1.88 m)	225 lb (102 kg)	Jr	San Antonio, Texas
25	OF	Daniel Budke	R/R	6 ft 0 in (1.83 m)	200 lb (91 kg)	Sr	Houston, Texas
26	OF	Connor Fremin	L/L	5 ft 7 in (1.7 m)	170 lb (77 kg)	Jr	Katy, Texas
27	INF	Matt Crossley	R/R	6 ft 2 in (1.88 m)	220 lb (100 kg)	Jr	Round Rock, Texas
28	RHP	Javan Smitherman	R/R	5 ft 10 in (1.78 m)	180 lb (82 kg)	Jr	Kilgore, Texas
29	C	Kevin Ortiz	R/R	5 ft 11 in (1.8 m)	180 lb (82 kg)	Jr	Richmond, Texas
30	INF	Caleb Munton	S/R	6 ft 0 in (1.83 m)	210 lb (95 kg)	Jr	Pilot Point, Texas
31	RHP	Kevin Conley	R/R	6 ft 0 in (1.83 m)	185 lb (84 kg)	Jr	Oak Ridge, Texas
32	INF	Reed Chumley	R/R	6 ft 1 in (1.85 m)	205 lb (93 kg)	Jr	Cypress, Texas
33	LHP	Austin Spinney	L/L	5 ft 10 in (1.78 m)	170 lb (77 kg)	Sr	Placentia, California
35	RHP	Andrew Reitmeyer	R/R	6 ft 4 in (1.93 m)	220 lb (100 kg)	Sr	Oceanside, California
36	RHP	Trey Valka	R/R	6 ft 3 in (1.91 m)	195 lb (88 kg)	Jr	Spring, Texas
39	LHP	Tim Ewald	R/L	6 ft 0 in (1.83 m)	210 lb (95 kg)	So	Saint Charles, Missouri
40	INF	Matt Crossley	R/R	6 ft 2 in (1.88 m)	240 lb (109 kg)	So	Round Rock, Texas
41	RHP	Daxton Tinker	R/R	6 ft 3 in (1.91 m)	210 lb (95 kg)	Jr	Sulphur, Louisiana
43	C	Parker Edwards	R/R	6 ft 4 in (1.93 m)	215 lb (98 kg)	Jr	Houston, Texas
44	RHP	Ethan Abbott	R/R	6 ft 5 in (1.96 m)	210 lb (95 kg)	Jr	Houston, Texas
45	RHP	Thomas King	R/R	6 ft 2 in (1.88 m)	215 lb (98 kg)	Jr	Louisville, Kentucky
	INF	Caden Biedermann	R/R	6 ft 2 in (1.88 m)	195 lb (88 kg)	Fr	Houston, Texas
	OF	Connor McBryde	R/R	6 ft 1 in (1.85 m)	205 lb (93 kg)	Fr	Spring, Texas

Head coach

Lance Berkman (Rice)

Assistant coach(es)

Clay VanderLaan (Graceland)
Tyler Bremer (Baylor)

Legend

- (C) Team captain
- (S) Suspended
- (I) Ineligible
- Injured
- Current redshirt

Roster
Last update: 8 January 2022

== Schedule and results ==
Legend
	Houston Baptist win
	Houston Baptist loss
	Postponement/Cancelation/Suspensions
**Bold**	Houston Baptist team member

2022 Houston Baptist Huskies baseball game log
Regular season (18–34)

February (2–6)
Date	Opponent	Rank	Site/stadium	Score	Win	Loss	Save	TV	Attendance	Overall record	SLC Record
Feb. 18	Rutgers		Husky Field • Houston, TX	**L** 0–4	Bello (1-0)	**Tinker** (0-1)	None	ESPN+	413	0–1	
Feb. 19	Rutgers		Husky Field • Houston, TX	**L** 3–18	Gorski (1-0)	**Abbott** (0-1)	None	ESPN+	434	0–2	
Feb. 20	Rutgers		Husky Field • Houston, TX	**L** 5–10	Sinibaldi (1-0)	**Burch** (0-1)	None	ESPN+	450	0–3	
Feb. 22	at Baylor		Baylor Ballpark • Waco, TX	**L** 2–6	Andrade (1-0)	**Ripoll** (0-1)	None	ESPN+	1,471	0–4	
Feb. 23	Rice		Husky Field • Houston, TX	**L** 2–6	Smith (1-0)	**Ricker** (0-1)	None	ESPN+	289	0–5	
Feb. 25	Hofstra		Constellation Field • Sugar Land, TX	**L** 1–3^{7}	Faello (1-0)	**Abbott** (0-2)	None		345	0–6	
Feb. 25	Hofstra		Constellation Field • Sugar Land, TX	**W** 4–3	**Reitmeyer** (1-0)	O'Hanlon (0-1)	None		345	1–6	
Feb. 27	Hofstra		Constellation Field • Sugar Land, TX	**W** 6–3	**Ewald** (1-0)	Nemjo (0-1)	**Reitmeyer** (1)		380	2–6	

March (6–11)
Date	Opponent	Rank	Site/stadium	Score	Win	Loss	Save	TV	Attendance	Overall record	SLC Record
Mar. 1	at Texas		Olsen Field at Blue Bell Park • College Station, TX	**L** 2–3	Curtis (2-0)	**Spinney** (0-1)	Rudis (1)	SECN+	4,777	2–7	
Mar. 4	at No. 23 Sacramento State		John Smith Field • Sacramento, CA	**L** 4–21^{7}	Harper (1-0)	**Tinker** (0-2)	None	ESPN+	92	2–8	
Mar. 5	at No. 23 Sacramento State		John Smith Field • Sacramento, CA	**W** 4–1^{7}	**Austin** (1-0)	Lucchesi (0-1)	**Reitmeyer** (2)	ESPN+	255	3–8	
Mar. 5	at No. 23 Sacramento State		John Smith Field • Sacramento, CA	**W** 3–2^{7}	**Ricker** (1-1)	Hunter (1-1)	**Reitmeyer** (3)	ESPN+	255	4–8	
Mar. 6	at No. 23 Sacramento State		John Smith Field • Sacramento, CA	**W** 4–1	**Ripoll** (1-1)	Stewart (1-1)	**Austin** (1)	ESPN+	83	5–8	
Mar. 9	Lamar		Husky Field • Houston, TX	**W** 10–2	**Smitherman** (1-0)	Ringo (0-1)	None	ESPN+	245	6–8	
Mar. 11	at Louisiana Tech		J. C. Love Field at Pat Patterson Park • Ruston, LA	**L** 2–22	Fincher (4-0)	**Dixon** (0-3)	None		2,237	6–9	
Mar. 12	at Louisiana Tech		J. C. Love Field at Pat Patterson Park • Ruston, LA	**L** 3–12	Jennings (1-1)	**Burch** (0-2)	None		2,327	6–10	
Mar. 13	at Louisiana Tech		J. C. Love Field at Pat Patterson Park • Ruston, LA	**L** 0–6	Whorff (1-2)	**Ripoll** (1-2)	None		2,257	6–11	
Mar. 15	UTSA		Husky Field • Houston, TX	**L** 5–10	Garza (1-0)	**Reitmeyer** (1-1)	None	ESPN+	405	6–12	
Mar. 18	at Michigan State		Drayton McLane Baseball Stadium at John H. Kobs Field • East Lansing, MI	**L** 3–4	Tomasic (2-0)	**Reitmeyer** (1-2)	None		312	6–13	
Mar. 20	at Michigan State		Drayton McLane Baseball Stadium at John W. Kobs Field • East Lansing, MI	**L** 0–1	Carson (1-0)	**Spinney** (0-2)	Bischoff (4)		1,051	6–14	
Mar. 20	at Michigan State		Drayton McLane Baseball Stadium at John W. Kobs Field • East Lansing, MI	**L** 5–6	Bischoff (1-0)	**King** (0-1)	None		1,051	6–15	
Mar. 22	Texas–Rio Grande Valley		Husky Field • Houston, TX	Game postponed							
Mar. 25	at McNeese State		Joe Miller Ballpark • Lake Charles, LA	**W** 6–4^{13}	**Spinney** (1-2)	Sheridan (0-1)	**Reitmeyer** (4)	ESPN+	764	7–15	1–0
Mar. 26	at McNeese State		Joe Miller Ballpark • Lake Charles, LA	**W** 5–3	**Burch** (1-2)	Abraham (2-3)	**Reitmeyer** (5)	ESPN+	860	8–15	2–0
Mar. 27	at McNeese State		Joe Miller Ballpark • Lake Charles, LA	**L** 7–13	Brady (1-1)	**Spinney** (1-3)	None		700	8–16	2–1
Mar. 29	at Texas–Rio Grande Valley		UTRGV Baseball Stadium • Edinburg, TX	**L** 7–8	Tjelmeland (1-0)	**Valka** (0-1)	None		1,086	8–17	

April (9–10)
Date	Opponent	Rank	Site/stadium	Score	Win	Loss	Save	TV	Attendance	Overall record	SLC Record
Apr. 1	New Orleans		Husky Field • Houston, TX	**L** 3–18^{7}	LeBlanc (4-0)	**Tinker** (0-4)	None	ESPN+	320	8–18	2–2
Apr. 2	New Orleans		Husky Field • Houston, TX	**W** 5–3	**Charles** (1-0)	Gauthe (1-1)	**Reitmeyer** (6)	ESPN+	367	9–18	3–2
Apr. 3	New Orleans		Husky Field • Houston, TX	**L** 10–14	Khachadourian (2-1)	**Powell** (0-1)	None	ESPN+	385	9–19	3–3
Apr. 5	at Rice		Reckling Park • Houston, TX	**L** 1–13^{7}	Burbank (1-3)	**King** (0-1)	None		1,893	9–20	
Apr. 8	Nicholls		Husky Field • Houston, TX	**L** 1–11^{7}	Theriot (4-2)	**Ripoll** (1-3)	None	ESPN+	201	9–21	3–4
Apr. 9	Nicholls		Husky Field • Houston, TX	**W** 6–5	**Reitmeyer** (2-2)	Andrews (2-1)	None	ESPN+	378	10–21	4–4
Apr. 10	Nicholls		Husky Field • Houston, TX	**W** 9–2	**Spinney** (2-3)	Heckman (1-2)	None	ESPN+	311	11–21	5–4
Apr. 12	Prairie View A&M		Husky Field • Houston, TX	**L** 9–11	Krall (3-4)	**King** (0-3)	Maxcey (2)	ESPN+	245	11–22	
Apr. 14	at Texas A&M–Corpus Christi		Chapman Field • Corpus Christi, TX	**L** 3–17^{7}	Garcia (4-2)	**Ripoll** (1-4)	None	ESPN+	344	11–23	5–5
Apr. 15	at Texas A&M–Corpus Christi		Chapman Field • Corpus Christi, TX	**W** 5–3	**Zarella** (1-0)	Miller (1-1)	**Reitmeyer** (7)	ESPN+	366	12–23	6–5
Apr. 16	at Texas A&M–Corpus Christi		Chapman Field • Corpus Christi, TX	**W** 11–5	**Charles** (2-0)	Ramirez Jr. (1-2)	None	ESPN+	319	13–23	7–5
Apr. 19	at Houston		Schroeder Park • Houston, TX	**L** 2–4	Miller (2-0)	**King** (0-4)	Dannelley (1)		935	13–24	
Apr. 20	at Lamar		Vincent–Beck Stadium • Beaumont, TX	**W** 1–0	**Ricker** (2-1)	Cole (2-1)	**Reitmeyer** (8)		1,923	14–24	
Apr. 22	at Northwestern State		H. Alvin Brown–C. C. Stroud Field • Natchitoches, LA	**L** 3–4	Collins (3-0)	**Smitherman** (1-1)	None		461	14–25	7–6
Apr. 23	at Northwestern State		H. Alvin Brown–C. C. Stroud Field • Natchitoches, LA	**L** 2–4	Harmon (5-4)	**Burch** (1-3)	None		475	14–26	7–7
Apr. 24	at Northwestern State		H. Alvin Brown–C. C. Stroud Field • Natchitoches, LA	**W** 10–1	**Charles** (3-0)	Brown (4-4)	None		502	15–26	8–7
Apr. 27	at Sam Houston State		Don Sanders Stadium • Huntsville, TX	**L** 3–19	Coldiron (2-3)	**Ripoll** (1-5)	None		455	15–27	
Apr. 29	Incarnate Word		Husky Field • Houston, TX	**W** 13–6	**Spinney** (3-3)	Garza (4-4)	None	ESPN+	205	16–27	9–7
Apr. 30	Incarnate Word		Husky Field • Houston, TX	**W** 10–9	**Reitmeyer** (3-2)	Mikulik (0-1)	None	ESPN+	237	17–27	10–7

May (1–7)
Date	Opponent	Rank	Site/stadium	Score	Win	Loss	Save	TV	Attendance	Overall record	SLC Record
May 1	Incarnate Word		Husky Field • Houston, TX	**W** 8–7	**Smitherman** (2-1)	Celestino (3-4)	**Zarella** (1)	ESPN+	389	18–27	11–7
May 3	at Texas		UFCU Disch–Falk Field • Austin, TX	**L** 3–13^{7}	Morehouse (2-0)	**Tinker** (0-5)	None	LHN	5,936	18–28	
May 6	at Southeastern Louisiana		Pat Kenelly Diamond at Alumni Field • Hammond, LA	**L** 5–6	Guth (3-1)	**Ripoll** (1-6)	Trahan (8)		1,096	18–29	11–8
May 7	at Southeastern Louisiana		Pat Kenelly Diamond at Alumni Field • Hammond, LA	**L** 15–18	Trahan (3-3)	**Bales** (0-1)	None		1,030	18–30	11–9
May 8	at Southeastern Louisiana		Pat Kenelly Diamond at Alumni Field • Hammond, LA	**L** 0–12^{7}	Landry (3-5)	**Charles** (3-1)	None		1,012	18–31	11–10
May 12	McNeese State		Husky Field • Houston, TX	**L** 5–23^{7}	Rogers (6-4)	**Spinney** (3-4)	None	ESPN+	236	18–32	11–11
May 13	McNeese State		Husky Field • Houston, TX	**L** 6–16^{7}	Jones (3-0)	**Burch** (1-4)	Sheridan (1)	ESPN+	304	18–33	11–12
May 14	McNeese State		Husky Field • Houston, TX	**L** 9–14	Stone (2-0)	**Reitmeyer** (3-3)	None	ESPN+	389	18–34	11–13

Postseason (0–2)

Southland Tournament (0–2)
Date	Opponent	(Seed)/Rank	Site/stadium	Score	Win	Loss	Save	TV	Attendance	Overall record	Tournament record
May 19	vs. (3) New Orleans	(6)	Pat Kenelly Diamond at Alumni Field • Hammond, LA	**L** 3–10	LeBlanc (7-1)	**Bales** (0-2)	None	ESPN+	477	18–35	0–1
May 20	vs. (2) Southeastern Louisiana	(6)	Pat Kenelly Diamond at Alumni Field • Hammond, LA	**L** 4–12	Guth (4-1)	**Burch** (1-5)	None	ESPN+	522	18–36	0–2

Schedule source:

*Rankings are based on the team's current ranking in the D1Baseball poll.
