= 2022 Lamar Cardinals baseball team =

American college baseball season

2022 Lamar Cardinals baseball
- Conference: Western Athletic Conference
- Southwest
- Record: 37–21 (20–10 WAC)
- Head coach: Will Davis (6th season)
- Assistant coaches: Scott Hatten; Sean Snedeker
- Home stadium: Vincent–Beck Stadium

2022 Western Athletic Conference baseball standings
	Conf.				Overall
Team	W		L	PCT	W		L	PCT
Southwest
Sam Houston State ^{x}‍‍‍	21	–	9	.700	31	–	25	.554
Lamar ‍‍‍	20	–	10	.667	37	–	21	.638
UTRGV ‍‍‍	17	–	13	.567	33	–	25	.569
Abilene Christian ‍‍‍	14	–	16	.467	30	–	29	.508
Tarleton State* ‍‍‍	10	–	20	.333	17	–	36	.321
Stephen F. Austin ‍‍‍	8	–	22	.267	15	–	37	.288
West
Grand Canyon ^{x}‍†‍‍^{y}	25	–	5	.833	41	–	19	.683
California Baptist* ‍‍‍	18	–	12	.600	36	–	20	.643
Sacramento State ‍‍‍	17	–	13	.567	32	–	26	.552
Dixie State* ‍‍‍	14	–	16	.467	22	–	33	.400
Seattle ‍‍‍	11	–	19	.367	16	–	34	.320
New Mexico State ‍‍‡‍^{y}	10	–	20	.333	24	–	32	.429
Utah Valley ‍‍‍	10	–	20	.333	19	–	37	.339
x – Division champion † – Conference champion ‡ – Tournament champion y – Invited to the NCAA tournament * ineligible for the 2022 NCAA tournament due to transition from Division II; Rankings from D1Baseball

The 2022 Lamar Cardinals baseball team represented Lamar University during the 2022 NCAA Division I baseball season. The Cardinals played their home games at Vincent–Beck Stadium and were led by sixth–year head coach Will Davis. They were members of the Western Athletic Conference. This was Lamar's first year in the WAC. The Cardinals had a regular season record of 37–21 and a conference record of 20–10 finishing in second place in the WAC Southwest division, one game behind division winner Sam Houston. They participated in the 2022 Western Athletic Conference baseball tournament as the second seeded team from the Southwest Division. After winning their first conference tournament game against Seattle, the Cardinals' season ended after losing to West Division first seed Grand Canyon and Southwest Division fourth seed Abilene Christian.

== Preseason ==
=== Western Athletic Conference Coaches Poll ===
The Western Athletic Conference Coaches Poll was released on February 9, 2022, and the Cardinals were picked to finish fourth in the Southwest Division with 11 votes.

Coaches poll
Predicted finish	Team	Votes (1st place)
1	Abilene Christian	25 (5)
2	Texas-Rio Grande Valley	19 (2)
2	Sam Houston	19
4	Lamar	11
5	Stephen F. Austin	9
6	Tarleton	7

=== Preseason All-WAC Team & Honors ===
2022 Preseason All-WAC Team

C - Kaden Hollow, So., Dixie State
1B - Elijah Buries, So., Grand Canyon
1B - Chase Kemp, Sr., Lamar
2B - Kevin Jiminez, Jr., NM State
3B - Juan Colato, R-Sr., Grand Canyon
SS - Jacob Wilson, So., Grand Canyon
OF - Tayler Aguilar, Jr., Grand Canyon
OF - Colton Eager, Gr., Abilene Christian
OF - Grayson Tatrow, Jr., Abilene Christian
DH/UT - Tommy Cruz, Sr., Abilene Christian
SP - Coltin Atkinson, So., Sam Houston
SP - Kevin Stevens, R-Sr., UT Rio Grande Valley
SP - Carter Young, So., Grand Canyon
RP - CJ Culpepper, So., California Baptist

== Roster ==
2022 Lamar Cardinals roster
Pitchers: 6 Daniel Cole – Junior; 8 Adam Wheaton – Senior; 12 Braxton Douthit – Junior; 14 Trhea Morse – Sophomore; 18 Max Mize – Senior; 19 Josh Ekness – Sophomore; 20 Jacob Ellis – Sophomore; 21 Zack Williams – Sophomore; 22 Paul Rector – Junior; 26 Jack Dallas – Senior; 27 Michael Barta – Sophomore; 32 Trent Tompkins – Freshman; 33 Ty Ringo – Sophomore; 36 Adam Davis – Sophomore; 39 Camden Guarnere – Sophomore; 43 Benjamin Content – Junior; 45 Landon Odom – Junior; 46 Owen Sheldon – Freshman; 49 Joe Buckendorff – Junior; 50 Dylan Johnson – Sophomore; 51 John Altman – Senior; 52 Patrick Hail – Sophomore; 54 Will Cox – Senior	Catchers: 9 Ryan Snell – Junior; 16 Kyle Harper – Junior; 34 Monray van der Walt – Freshman RS; 37 Josh Blankenship – Junior; Infielders: 3 Deric Lamontagne – Junior; 5 Jack Schell – Junior; 11 Kelby Weyler – Junior; 13 Ethan Ruiz – Junior; 17 Chase Kemp – Senior; 23 Kevin Bermudez – Sophomore; 28 Kirkland Banks – Junior RS; 30 Wesley Schields – Junior; 31 Gavin Baratta – Freshman; 35 Cameron Yadon – Freshman; 42 Tyler Shepard – Freshman; Outfielders: 1 Reese Durand – Junior; 2 Matthew McDonald – Senior; 4 Ben MacNaughton – Junior; 7 Nathan Carriere – Junior; 22 Cole Girouard – Senior; 38 Tanner Wilson – Sophomore; 46 Owen Sheldon – Freshman

=== Coaching staff ===
2022 lamar cardinals coaching staff
- Will Davis – Head coach – 6th year
- Scott Hatten – Associate head coach/hitting coach/recruiting coordinator – 21st year
- Sean Snedeker – Assistant head coach/pitching coach – 5th year

== Schedule and results ==
Legend
	Lamar win
	Lamar loss
	Postponement/Cancelation/Suspensions
**Bold**	Lamar team member

2022 Lamar Cardinals baseball game log
Regular season (36–19)

February (4–3)
Date	Opponent	Rank	Site/stadium	Score	Win	Loss	Save	TV	Attendance	Overall record	WAC record
Feb. 18	Binghamton		Vincent–Beck Stadium • Beaumont, TX	**W** 2–1	**Williams** (1–0)	Henderson (0–1)			1,102	1–0	
Feb. 19	Binghamton		Vincent–Beck Stadium • Beaumont, TX	**W** 16–1	**Wheaton** (1–0)	Lumpinski (0–1)			856	2–0	
Feb. 20	Binghamton		Vincent–Beck Stadium • Beaumont, TX	L 5–9	Bryggman (1–0)	**Ekness** (0–1)			867	2–1	
Feb. 22	at Texas A&M		Blue Bell Park • College Station, TX	L 3–9	Khristian (1–0)	**Williams** (1–1)		ESPN+	4578	2–2	
Feb. 25	at Rice		Reckling Park • Houston, TX	**W** 12–6	**Douthit** (1–0)	Chandler (0–2)		CUSA TV	1728	3–2	
Feb. 26	at Rice		Reckling Park • Houston, TX	**W** 8–6	**Dallas** (1–0)	Linskey (0–1)		CUSA TV	1806	4–2	
Feb. 27	at Rice		Reckling Park • Houston, TX	L 6–8	Deskins (1–1)	**Odom** (0–1)	Linskey (1)	CUSA TV	1734	4–3	

March (11–7)
Date	Opponent	Rank	Site/stadium	Score	Win	Loss	Save	TV	Attendance	Overall record	WAC record
Mar. 1	at Houston		Schroeder Park • Houston, TX	L 5–6	Cherry (1–1)	**Odom** (0–2)	Sears (1)		253	4–4	
Mar. 4	Mount St. Mary's		Vincent–Beck Stadium • Beaumont, TX	**W** 5–4	**Douthit** (2–0)	Breznak (0–2)	**Dallas** (1)	WACD	1152	5–4	
Mar. 5	Mount St. Mary's		Vincent–Beck Stadium • Beaumont, TX	**W** 12–1	**Wheaton** (2–0)	Ament (0–1)		WACD	1647	6–4	
Mar. 5	Mount St. Mary's		Vincent–Beck Stadium • Beaumont, TX	**W** 14–5	**Buckendorff** (1–0)	Adams (0–1)		WACD	1647	7–4	
Mar. 6	Mount St. Mary's		Vincent–Beck Stadium • Beaumont, TX	**W** 5–0	**Morse** (1–0)	Midkiff (0–1)		WACD	864	8–4	
Mar. 9	at Houston Baptist		Husky Field • Houston, TX	L 2–10	Smitherman (1–0)	**Ringo**(0–1)		ESPN+	245	8–5	
Mar. 12	at Stephen F. Austin		Jaycees Field • Nacogdoches, TX	**W** 2–1	**Douthit** (3–0)	Richter (1–1)	**Dallas** (2)	ESPN+	212	9–5	1-0
Mar. 12	at Stephen F. Austin		Jaycees Field • Nacogdoches, TX	**W** 14–3	**Wheaton** (3–0)	Dewberry (1–2)		ESPN+	197	10–5	2-0
Mar. 13	at Stephen F. Austin		Jaycees Field • Nacogdoches, TX	**W** 6–3	**Williams** (2–1)	Todd (0–3)	**Buckendorff** (1)	ESPN+	197	11–5	3-0
Mar. 15	at Northwestern State		H. Alvin Brown–C. C. Stroud Field • Natchitoches, LA	L 7–21	Taylor (2–0)	**Ellis** (0–1)			487	11–6	
Mar. 18	Sam Houston		Vincent–Beck Stadium • Beaumont, TX	**W** 3–2 (10)	**Dallas** (2–0)	Coldiron (1–1)		WACD	1460	12–6	4-0
Mar. 19	Sam Houston		Vincent–Beck Stadium • Beaumont, TX	**W** 8–2	**Wheaton** (4–0)	Beard (1–2)		WACD	1207	13–6	5-0
Mar. 20	Sam Houston		Vincent–Beck Stadium • Beaumont, TX	L 3–9	Hewitt (1–1)	**Buckendorff** (1–1)		WACD	836	13–7	5-1
Mar. 23	at Texas A&M–Corpus Christi		Chapman Field • Corpus Christi, TX	**W** 7–2	**Mize** (1–0)	Shy (1–2)				13–8	
Mar. 25	at Texas–Rio Grande Valley		UTRGV Baseball Stadium • Edinburg, TX	**W** 9–8	**Cole** (1–0)	Gerik Jr. (1–2)	**Dallas** (3)	WACD	1288	14–8	6-1
Mar. 26	at Texas–Rio Grande Valley		UTRGV Baseball Stadium • Edinburg, TX	L 2–5	Davis (4–0)	**Wheaton** (4–1)	Gerik Jr. (3)	WACD	1341	14–9	6-2
Mar. 27	at Texas–Rio Grande Valley		UTRGV Baseball Stadium • Edinburg, TX	L 2–14	Aldaz (2–2)	**Morse** (1–1)		WACD	821	14–10	6-3
Mar. 29	at Nicholls		Ray E. Didier Field • Thibodaux, LA	L 2–5	Mancuso (2–0)	**Odom** (0–3)	Vial Jr (1)		493	14–11	

April (12–6)
Date	Opponent	Rank	Site/stadium	Score	Win	Loss	Save	TV	Attendance	Overall record	WAC record
Apr. 1	Abilene Christian		Vincent–Beck Stadium • Beaumont, TX	L 3–6	Morgan (4–0)	**Douthit** (3–1)		WACD	1182	15–11	6-4
Apr. 2	Abilene Christian		Vincent–Beck Stadium • Beaumont, TX	**W** 3–2	**Cole** (2–0)	Huffling (3–1)	**Dallas** (4)	WACD	1183	16–11	7-4
Apr. 3	Abilene Christian		Vincent–Beck Stadium • Beaumont, TX	L 8–11	Sells (2–1)	**Davis** (0–1)	Riley (2)	WACD	783	16–12	7-5
Apr. 3	Texas Southern		Vincent–Beck Stadium • Beaumont, TX	**W** 7–4	**Davis** (1–1)	Castro (3–3)	**Dallas** (5)	WACD	840	17–12	
Apr. 6	Northwestern State		Vincent–Beck Stadium • Beaumont, TX	**W** 9–6	**Morse** (2–1)	Frances (0–1)		WACD	988	18–12	
Apr. 8	at Tarleton State		Cecil Ballow Baseball Complex • Stephenville, TX	**W** 4–1	**Douthit** (4–1)	Bailey (3–1)	**Dallas** (6)	WACD	988	19–12	8-5
Apr. 9	at Tarleton State		Cecil Ballow Baseball Complex • Stephenville, TX	**W** 15–8	**Wheaton** (5–1)	Burcham (0–1)		WACD	575	20–12	9-5
Apr. 10	at Tarleton State		Cecil Ballow Baseball Complex • Stephenville, TX	L 2–12	Hackett (2–4)	**Ekness** (0–2)		WACD	390	20–13	9-6
Apr. 12	at LSU	15	Alex Box Stadium • Baton Rouge, LA								Game Cancelled
Apr. 15	vs Pacific		L. Dale Mitchell Baseball Park • Norman, OK	**W** 13–2	**Wheaton** (6–1)	Hayes (2–6)				21–13	
Apr. 15	at Oklahoma		L. Dale Mitchell Baseball Park • Norman, OK	**W** 14–11	**Douthit** (5–1)	Bennett (2–2)			916	22–13	
Apr. 18	at Baylor		Baylor Ballpark • Waco, TX	L 1–5	Caley (2–0)	**Buckendorff** (1–2)			1553	22–14	
Apr. 20	Houston Baptist		Vincent–Beck Stadium • Beaumont, TX	L 0–1	Ricker (2–1)	**Cole** (2–1)	Reitmeyer (8)	WACD	1923	22–15	
Apr. 22	Stephen F. Austin		Vincent–Beck Stadium • Beaumont, TX	**W** 5–4	**Douthit** (6–1)	Todd (1–5)	**Dallas** (7)	WACD	1092	23–15	10-6
Apr. 23	Stephen F. Austin		Vincent–Beck Stadium • Beaumont, TX	L 0–6	Emmons III (3–0)	**Wheaton** (6–2)		WACD	1012	23–16	10-7
Apr. 24	Stephen F. Austin		Vincent–Beck Stadium • Beaumont, TX	**W** 4–3	**Dallas** (3–0)	Jaco (0–3)		WACD	1082	24–16	11-7
Apr. 26	Houston		Vincent–Beck Stadium • Beaumont, TX	**W** 4–1	**Odom** (1–3)	Cherry (2–2)	**Morse** (1)	WACD	1157	25–16	
Apr. 29	at Sam Houston		Don Sanders Stadium • Huntsville, TX	**W** 8–7	**Mize** (2–0)	Davis (0–1)	**Dallas** (8)	ESPN+	955	26–16	12-7
Apr. 29	at Sam Houston		Don Sanders Stadium • Huntsville, TX	**W** 1–0	**Wheaton** (7–2)	Beard (4–3)	**Dallas** (9)	ESPN+	1055	27–16	13-7

May (9–3)
Date	Opponent	Rank	Site/stadium	Score	Win	Loss	Save	TV	Attendance	Overall record	WAC record
May 1	at Sam Houston		Don Sanders Stadium • Huntsville, TX	L 3–5	Lusk (3–0)	**Cole** (2–2)			980	27–17	13-8
May 3	at Southern		Lee–Hines Field • Baton Rouge, LA	**W** 15–5 (7 inn.)	**Altman** (1–0)	Davis (1–4)			296	28–17	
May 6	Texas–Rio Grande Valley		Vincent–Beck Stadium • Beaumont, TX	L 5–9	Stevens (7–2)	**Douthit** (6–2)		WACD	1082	28–18	13-9
May 7	Texas–Rio Grande Valley		Vincent–Beck Stadium • Beaumont, TX	**W** 5–2	**Wheaton** (8–2)	Aldaz (5–4)	**Dallas** (10)	WACD	1014	29–18	14-9
May 8	Texas–Rio Grande Valley		Vincent–Beck Stadium • Beaumont, TX	L 1–6	Garza (2–1)	**Cole** (2–3)		WACD	1014	29–19	14-10
May 10	Southern		Vincent–Beck Stadium • Beaumont, TX	**W** 10–1	**Buckendorff** (2–2)	Kyles' (0–1)		WACD	538	30–19	
May 13	at Abilene Christian		Crutcher Scott Field • Abilene, TX	**W** 17–9	**Cole** (3–3)	Morgan (5–3)		ESPN+	137	31–19	15-10
May 14	at Abilene Christian		Crutcher Scott Field • Abilene, TX	**W** 9–5	**Wheaton** (9–2)	Cervamtes (5–4)		ESPN+	267	32–19	16-10
May 15	at Abilene Christian		Crutcher Scott Field • Abilene, TX	**W** 7–4	**Ellis** (1–1)	Stephensen (2–3)	**Dallas** (11)	ESPN+	312	33–19	17-10
May 19	Tarleton State		Vincent–Beck Stadium • Beaumont, TX	**W** 4–3 (10 inn.)	**Dallas** (4–0)	Badmaev (2–3)		WACD	783	34–19	18-10
May 20	Tarleton State		Vincent–Beck Stadium • Beaumont, TX	**W** 6–2	**Wheaton** (10–2)	Hackett (2–7)	**Dallas** (12)	WACD	887	35–19	19-10
May 21	Tarleton State		Vincent–Beck Stadium • Beaumont, TX	**W** 5–4	**Ellis** (2–1)	Boyd (1–5)	**Dallas** (13)	WACD	926	36–19	20-10

Postseason

WAC Tournament
Date	Opponent	Site/stadium	Score	Win	Loss	Save	TV	Attendance	Overall record	WACT Record
May 25	vs Seattle	Hohokam Stadium; Mesa, AZ	**W** 6–4	**Mize** (3–0)	Chronowski (4–7)	**Dallas** (14)	ESPN+		37–19	1-0
May 26	vs Grand Canyon	Hohokam Stadium; Mesa, AZ	L 3–4	Reilly (7–1)	**Dallas** (4–1)		ESPN+		37–20	1-1
May 27	vs Abilene Christian	Hohokam Stadium; Mesa, AZ	L 4–9	Stephenson (3–3)	**Ellis** (2–2)		ESPN+		37–21	1-2

Legend: = Win = Loss = Canceled
Bold = Lamar team member
Rankings are based on the team's current ranking in the D1Baseball poll.

=== Postseason All-WAC Team & Honors ===
2022 Postseason All-WAC Teams
2022 First Team All-WAC
Catcher: David Martin, So., California Baptist
First Base: Logan Gallina, So., NM State
Second Base: Harrison Spohn, Sr., California Baptist
Third Base: Juan Colato, R-Sr., Grand Canyon
Shortstop: Jacob Wilson, So., Grand Canyon
Outfield: Tayler Aguilar, Jr., Grand Canyon
Outfield: Chad Castillo, Jr., California Baptist
Outfield: Carlos Contreras, Jr., Sam Houston
DH/Utility: Parker Schmidt, So., Dixie State
At-Large: Tyler Wilson, So., C, Grand Canyon
Starting Pitcher: Daniel Avitia, Fr., Grand Canyon
Starting Pitcher: Kevin Stevens, R-Sr, UT Rio Grande Valley
Relief Pitcher: Jack Dallas, Sr., Lamar
At-Large: Vince Reilly, Jr., RHP, Grand Canyon

2022 Second Team All-WAC
Catcher: Kaden Hollow, So., Dixie State
First Base: Justin Wishkoski, So., Sam Houston
Second Base: Kemuel Thomas-Rivera, Gr., Tarleton
Third Base: Mitchel Simon, So., California Baptist
Shortstop: Bash Randle, So., Abilene Christian
Outfield: Brett Cain, Gr., UT Rio Grande Valley
Outfield: Matthew McDonald, Sr., Lamar
Outfield: Brandon Pimentel, Jr., UT Rio Grande Valley
DH/Utility: Russell Stevenson, Sr., California Baptist
At-Large: London Green, Sr., OF, Tarleton
Starting Pitcher: CJ Culpepper, So., California Baptist
Starting Pitcher: Adam Wheaton, Sr., Lamar
Relief Pitcher: Lance Lusk, Sr., Sam Houston
At-Large: Nick Hull, Gr., RHP, Grand Canyon

2022 All-Defensive Team
Kirkland Banks, Jr., IF, Lamar
Logan Gallina, So., 1B, NM State
London Green, Sr., OF, Tarleton
Walker Janek, Fr., UT, Sam Houston
Chase Kemp, Sr., IF, Lamar
Isaac Lopez, R-Fr., IF, UT Rio Grande Valley
Bash Randle, So., SS, Abilene Christian
Harrison Spohn, Sr., IF, California Baptist
Jacob Wilson, So., SS, Grand Canyon
Cade Verdusco, So., OF, Grand Canyon
