= 2022 Western Athletic Conference baseball tournament =

- Teams: 8
- Format: Double-elimination
- Finals site: Hohokam Stadium; Mesa, Arizona
- Champions: New Mexico State

2022 Western Athletic Conference baseball standings
	Conf.				Overall
Team	W		L	PCT	W		L	PCT
Southwest
Sam Houston State ^{x}‍‍‍	21	–	9	.700	31	–	25	.554
Lamar ‍‍‍	20	–	10	.667	37	–	21	.638
UTRGV ‍‍‍	17	–	13	.567	33	–	25	.569
Abilene Christian ‍‍‍	14	–	16	.467	30	–	29	.508
Tarleton State* ‍‍‍	10	–	20	.333	17	–	36	.321
Stephen F. Austin ‍‍‍	8	–	22	.267	15	–	37	.288
West
Grand Canyon ^{x}‍†‍‍^{y}	25	–	5	.833	41	–	19	.683
California Baptist* ‍‍‍	18	–	12	.600	36	–	20	.643
Sacramento State ‍‍‍	17	–	13	.567	32	–	26	.552
Dixie State* ‍‍‍	14	–	16	.467	22	–	33	.400
Seattle ‍‍‍	11	–	19	.367	16	–	34	.320
New Mexico State ‍‍‡‍^{y}	10	–	20	.333	24	–	32	.429
Utah Valley ‍‍‍	10	–	20	.333	19	–	37	.339
x – Division champion † – Conference champion ‡ – Tournament champion y – Invited to the NCAA tournament * ineligible for the 2022 NCAA tournament due to transition from Division II; Rankings from D1Baseball

The 2022 Western Athletic Conference baseball tournament will take place beginning on May 25 and ending on May 28. The top four regular season finishers of the league's two divisions will meet in the double-elimination tournament to be held at Hohokam Stadium, spring training home of the Oakland Athletics in Mesa, Arizona. California Baptist, Dixie State, and Tarleton State are ineligible for the postseason as each program is still in the transition to Division I. The winner will earn the Western Athletic Conference's automatic bid to the 2022 NCAA Division I baseball tournament.

== Seeding and format ==
The top four finishers from each division will be seeded based on conference winning percentage from the regular season.

== Results ==
First round
SW1	Sam Houston	1
W4	New Mexico State	3
W2	Sacramento State	1
SW3	UTRGV	2
SW1	Sam Houston	2
W2	Sacramento State	3
W1	Grand Canyon	8
SW4	Abilene Christian	4
SW2	Lamar	6
W3	Seattle U	4
SW4	Abilene Christian	10
W3	Seattle U	3

Second round
W4	New Mexico State	10
SW3	UTRGV	0^{7}
SW3	UTRGV	5
W2	Sacramento State	9
W1	Grand Canyon	4
SW2	Lamar	3
SW2	Lamar	4
SW4	Abilene Christian	9

Semifinals
W4	New Mexico State	7	—
W2	Sacramento State	3	—
W1	Grand Canyon	5	8
SW4	Abilene Christian	6	15

Finals
W4	New Mexico State	7
SW4	Abilene Christian	1
