= Texas A&M–Corpus Christi Islanders baseball =

Texas A&M–Corpus Christi Islanders
- 2026 Texas A&M–Corpus Christi Islanders baseball team
- University: Texas A&M University–Corpus Christi
- Head coach: Scott Malone (19th season)
- Conference: Southland
- Location: Corpus Christi, Texas
- Home stadium: Chapman Field (capacity: 750)
- Nickname: Islanders
- Colors: Royal blue, white, and green

The Texas A&M–Corpus Christi Islanders baseball team is a varsity intercollegiate athletic team of Texas A&M University–Corpus Christi in Corpus Christi, Texas, United States. The team is a member of the Southland Conference, which is part of the National Collegiate Athletic Association's Division I. The team plays its home games at on-campus Chapman Field in Corpus Christi, Texas. Off-campus Whataburger Field is the home venue for some high-profile games and tournaments. The Islanders are coached by Scott Malone.

== History ==
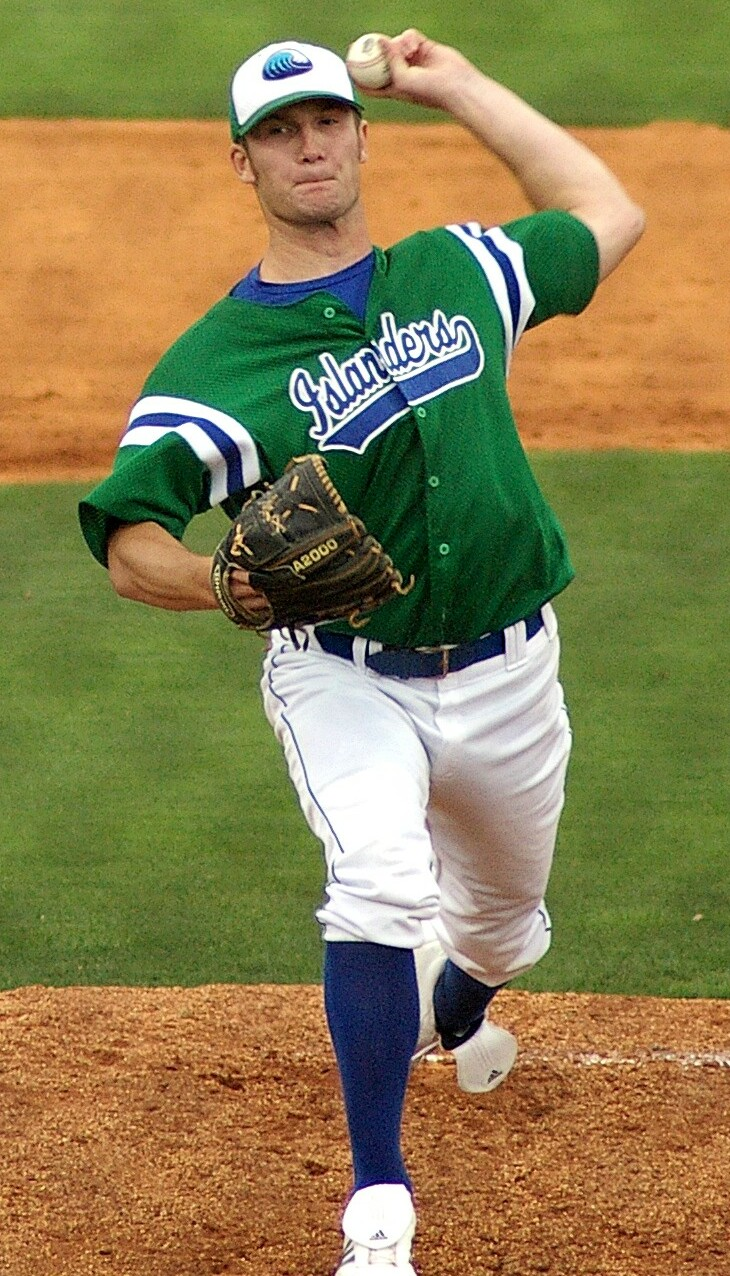
Emerson Trager, An Islanders pitcher during a game in 2006

=== Conference membership history ===
- 2000–2006: Division I Independent
- 2007–Present: Southland Conference

== Head coaches ==
| Coach | Seasons | Years | W | L | T | Pct |
|---|---|---|---|---|---|---|
| Hector Salinas | 7 | 2000–2006 | 172 | 191 | 1 | .474 |
| Gene Salazar | 1 | 2007 | 27 | 29 | 0 | .482 |
| Scott Malone | 15 | 2008–Present | 375 | 424 | 2 | .452 |

== Year-by-year results ==
| Year | Coach | Overall record | Conference record | Notes |
|---|---|---|---|---|
| 2000 | Hector Salinas | 23–29 | | |
| 2001 | Hector Salinas | 18–36 | | |
| 2002 | Hector Salinas | 24–29 | | |
| 2003 | Hector Salinas | 33–17 | | |
| 2004 | Hector Salinas | 23–28 | | |
| 2005 | Hector Salinas | 31–21–1 | | |
| 2006 | Hector Salinas | 20–31 | | |
| 2007 | Gene Salazar | 27–29 | 12–18; 5th West | |
| 2008 | Scott Malone | 24–33–1 | 14–15–1; 5th West | Southland Tournament |
| 2009 | Scott Malone | 18–38 | 9–24; 12th | |
| 2010 | Scott Malone | 20–33–1 | 10–22–1; 11th | |
| 2011 | Scott Malone | 37–24 | 19–14; 3rd | Southland Tournament |
| 2012 | Scott Malone | 24–33 | 14–19; 8th | Southland Tournament |
| 2013 | Scott Malone | 33–24 | 17–10; 2nd | Southland Tournament |
| 2014 | Scott Malone | 31–27 | 19–11; 4th | Southland Tournament |
| 2015 | Scott Malone | 26–27 | 13–14; 8th | Southland Tournament |
| 2016 | Scott Malone | 19–32 | 8–20; 10th | |
| 2017 | Scott Malone | 22–32 | 14–16; 9th | |
| 2018 | Scott Malone | 30–26 | 14–16; 7th | |
| 2019 | Scott Malone | 30–24 | 14–16; 7th | Southland Tournament |
| 2020 | Scott Malone | 8–10 | 2–1 | Season cut short due to COVID-19 pandemic |
| 2021 | Scott Malone | 25–29 | 20–14; 2nd | Southland Tournament |
| 2022 | Scott Malone | 27–28 | 10–14; 4th | Southland Tournament |
| 2022 | Scott Malone | 27–28 | 10–14; 7th | Southland Tournament |
| 2023 | Scott Malone | 24–30 | 12–12; T-5th | Southland Tournament |
| 2024 | Scott Malone | 22–35 | 10–14; 8th | Southland Tournament |
| 2025 | Scott Malone | 21–31 | 12–18; 7th | Southland Tournament |
| 2026 | Scott Malone | 23–27 | 11–18 | |

== Major League Baseball ==
Texas A&M–Corpus Christi has had 14 Major League Baseball draft selections since the draft began in 1965.

Islanders in the Major League Baseball Draft
| Year | Player | Round | Team |
|---|---|---|---|
| 2005 | Trey Hearne | 28 | Cardinals |
| 2005 | Charles Carter | 27 | Cardinals |
| 2010 | Sean Hoelscher | 27 | Nationals |
| 2011 | Matthew Holland | 22 | Phillies |
| 2011 | Todd Simko | 21 | Nationals |
| 2012 | Daniel Minor | 9 | Astros |
| 2013 | Eric Weiss | 35 | Angels |
| 2013 | Trevor Foss | 22 | Angels |
| 2015 | Trevor Belicek | 16 | Braves |
| 2016 | Casey Thomas | 34 | Athletics |
| 2016 | Chris Falwell | 16 | Giants |
| 2018 | Harrison DiNicola | 27 | Marlins |
| 2018 | Aaron Hernandez | 3 | Angels |
| 2019 | Dustin Lacaze | 21 | Diamondbacks |

== See also ==
- List of NCAA Division I baseball programs
