= 2022 Texas Longhorns baseball team =

College Baseball Season

2022 Texas Longhorns baseball

NCAA Austin Regional champions NCAA Greenville Super Regional champions

Big 12 tournament, runners-up

College World Series, 0–2
- Conference: Big 12 Conference

Ranking
- Coaches: No. 8
- CB: No. 7
- Record: 47–22 (14–10 Big 12)
- Head coach: David Pierce (6th season)
- Assistant coaches: Sean Allen (6th season); Philip Miller (6th season); Troy Tulowitzki (3rd season)
- Home stadium: UFCU Disch–Falk Field

2022 Big 12 Conference baseball standings
	Conf.				Overall
Team	W		L	PCT	W		L	PCT
No. 23 TCU ‍†‍‍^{y}	16	–	8	.667	38	–	22	.633
Oklahoma State ‍‍‍^{y}	15	–	9	.625	42	–	22	.656
No. 2 Oklahoma ‍‍‡‍^{y}	15	–	9	.625	45	–	24	.652
No. 24 Texas Tech ‍‍‍^{y}	15	–	9	.625	39	–	22	.639
No. 8 Texas ‍‍‍^{y}	14	–	10	.583	47	–	22	.681
West Virginia ‍‍‍	14	–	10	.583	33	–	22	.600
Kansas State ‍‍‍	8	–	16	.333	29	–	29	.500
Baylor ‍‍‍	7	–	17	.292	26	–	28	.481
Kansas ‍‍‍	4	–	20	.167	20	–	35	.364
† – Conference champion ‡ – Tournament champion y – Invited to the NCAA tournament Rankings from D1baseball

The 2022 Texas Longhorns baseball team represented the University of Texas at Austin during the 2022 NCAA Division I baseball season. The Longhorns played their home games at UFCU Disch–Falk Field as a member of the Big 12 Conference. They were led by head coach David Pierce, in his 6th season at Texas.

== Previous season ==
=== Regular season ===
The Longhorns finished the 2021 season with a 50–17 record and a 17–7 record in conference play where they were crowned Big 12 Regular season co-champions for the 9th time alongside TCU. This was the 24th time the Longhorns have won 50 plus games in a season and the first 50 win season for Texas since 2010.

=== Postseason ===
After the regular season, the Longhorns went 2–2 in the Big 12 Conference tournament. However, the Longhorns went on to win the Austin Regional by defeating Fairfield and the Austin Super Regional by defeating South Florida, sending them to College World Series. The Longhorns went on to go 3–2 in the College World Series and making the final four. After a first round loss to Mississippi State, Texas won three straight games against Tennessee, Virginia, and Mississippi State, and then was defeated by Mississippi State in the second game of the Semifinals.

== Personnel ==
=== Roster ===
2022 Texas Longhorns roster
Pitchers: 11 – Tanner Witt – Sophomore (6'5, 215) (injured); 13 – Lucas Gordon – Sophomore (6'1, 193); 24 – Chase Lummus – (redshirt) Sophomore (6'1, 205); 31 – Jace Hutchins – (redshirt) Sophomore (6'5, 220); 33 – Pete Hansen – (redshirt) Sophomore (6'2, 205); 34 – Joshua Stewart – Freshman (6'2, 185); 35 – Tristan Stevens – (redshirt) Senior (6'2, 200); 36 – Daniel Blair – (redshirt) Junior (6'3, 205); 37 – Zane Morehouse – (redshirt) Sophomore (6'4, 200); 38 – Caden Noah – Sophomore (5’10, 190); 39 – Travis Sthele – (redshirt) Freshman (6'0, 198); 41 – Aaron Nixon – Sophomore (6'1, 205); 43 – Alec Grossman – Freshman (5'10, 170); 45 – Coy Cobb – (redshirt) Junior (6'4, 193); 46 – Marcus Olivarez – Senior (6'3, 200); 47 – Sam Walbridge – (redshirt) Sophomore (6'5, 210); 48 – Cameron O’Banan – Freshman (6'2, 185); 49 – Jared Southard – (redshirt) Sophomore (6'2, 220); 53 – Luke Harrison – Freshman (6'2, 175); 54 – Cameron Dayton – Junior (6'3, 207); 56 – Justin Eckhardt – (redshirt) Sophomore (6'2, 205); 57 – Lebarron Johnson Jr. – (redshirt) Freshman (6'4, 207); 58 – Carson McKinney – Freshman (6'4, 225); 88 – Andre Duplantier II – (redshirt) Sophomore (6'2, 215)	Catchers: 4 – Silas Ardoin – (redshirt) Sophomore (6'0, 215); 10 – Kimble Schuessler – Sophomore (6'2, 205); 15 – Peyton Powell – (redshirt) Sophomore (6'1, 188); 29 – Cam Constantine – (redshirt) Sophomore (6'0, 200); 40 – Preston Hoffart – (redshirt) Sophomore (5’11, 190) (S); Infielders: 0 – Trey Faltine – (redshirt) Sophomore (6'2, 198); 5 – Skyler Messinger – (redshirt) Senior (6'3, 220); 6 – Gavin Kash – Freshman (6'3, 198); 8 – Dylan Campbell – Sophomore (5’11, 205); 14 – Murphy Stehly – (redshirt) Senior (5’10, 205); 17 – Ivan Melendez – (redshirt) Junior (6'3, 225); 19 – Mitchell Daly – Sophomore (6'1, 185); 27 – Jack O’Dowd – Sophomore (6'2, 195)	Outfielders: 7 – Douglas Hodo III – (redshirt) Sophomore (6'0, 185); 28 – Ace Whitehead – Freshman (5’11, 185); 30 – Eric Kennedy – (redshirt) Junior (5'11, 203); 42 – Jack Arthur – Freshman (6'1, 195); 44 – Austin Todd – (redshirt) Senior (6'1, 195); Legend: (S) Suspended; (I) Ineligible; Injured; Redshirt

Injured list
Player	Position	Class	Injury	Injury Length
Tanner Witt	P	Sophomore	Torn UCL	Out for season

=== Starters ===
Lineup
Pos.	No.	Player.	Year
C	4	Silas Ardoin	RS So.
1B	17	Ivan Melendez	RS Jr.
2B	19	Mitchell Daly	So.
3B	5	Skyler Messinger	RS Sr.
SS	0	Trey Faltine	RS So.
LF	30	Eric Kennedy	RS Jr.
CF	7	Douglas Hodo III	RS So.
RF	8	Dylan Campbell	So.
DH	14	Murphy Stehly	RS Sr.

Weekend pitching rotation
Day	No.	Player.	Year
Friday	33	Pete Hansen	RS So.
Saturday	35	Tristan Stevens	RS. Sr.
Sunday	13	Lucas Gordon	So.

=== Coaches ===
2022 Texas Longhorns coaching staff
- David Pierce – Head coach – 6th year
- Sean Allen – Assistant coach – 6th year
- Philip Miller – Assistant coach – 6th year
- Troy Tulowitzki – Volunteer assistant coach – 3rd year

=== Support staff ===
2022 Texas Longhorns support staff
- Carli Todd – Director of player development – 7th year
- Heather Vacek – Director of operations – 1st year
- Matt Couch – Assistant coach for athletic performance – 3rd year
- Tom Mendez – Assistant athletic trainer – 3rd year
- Caleb Longley – Hitting and pitching development – 1st year
- Chris Quinn – Equipment manager – 1st year

== Offseason ==
2022 Texas offseason departures
Name	Number	Pos.	Height	Weight	Year	Hometown	Notes
Ty Madden	32	P	6’3	215	Redshirt Sophomore	Cypress, TX	Drafted in the Competitive Balance Round A of the 2021 MLB draft by the Detroit Tigers
Mike Antico	5	OF	5’10	210	Redshirt Senior	Colts Neck, NJ	Drafted in the 8th round of the 2021 MLB Draft by the St. Louis Cardinals
Cole Quintanilla	34	P	6’5	220	Redshirt Sophomore	Cedar Park, TX	Drafted in the 9th round of the 2021 MLB Draft by the Washington Nationals
Kolby Kubichek	27	P	6’0	180	Redshirt Sophomore	Bryan, TX	Drafted in the 18th round of the 2021 MLB Draft by the New York Mets
Cam Williams	55	IF	6’2	200	Redshirt Junior	Odessa, FL	Drafted in the 19th round of the 2021 MLB Draft by the Kansas City Royals
Zach Zubia	52	IF	6’4	230	Redshirt Junior	Richmond, TX	Drafted in the 20th round of the 2021 MLB Draft by the Miami Marlins
DJ Petrinsky	6	C	6’0	195	Redshirt Senior	Magnolia, TX	Graduated
Palmer Wenzel	46	P	6’1	195	Redshirt Senior	McKinney, TX	Graduated
Drew Shifflet	54	P	6’0	188	Redshirt Sophomore	Woden, TX	Transferred to Louisiana
Dalton Porter	51	OF	6’0	190	Freshman	Leander, TX	Transferred to Texas Tech
Austin Wallace	40	P	6’4	212	Redshirt Freshman	Flower Mound, TX	Transferred to Wichita State
Mason Bryant	58	P	6’5	220	Redshirt Sophomore	Austin, TX	Transferred to Temple College
Lance Ford	28	IF	5’10	175	Redshirt Sophomore	Kerrville, TX	N/A
Dawson Merryman	42	P	6’1	215	Redshirt Sophomore	Greenwood, TX	N/A
Peter Geib	43	IF	6’2	210	Redshirt Sophomore	Houston, TX	N/A
Caston Peter	48	C	6’0	210	Redshirt Sophomore	Houston, TX	N/A

=== Transfers ===
Outgoing transfers
Name	No.	Pos.	Height	Weight	Hometown	Year	New school
Drew Shifflet	54	P	6’0	188	Woden, TX	Redshirt Sophomore	Louisiana
Dalton Porter	51	OF	6’0	190	Leander, TX	Freshman	Texas Tech
Mason Bryant	58	P	6’5	220	Austin, TX	Redshirt Sophomore	Temple College
Austin Wallace	40	P	6’4	212	Flower Mound, TX	Redshirt Freshman	Wichita State

Incoming transfers
Name	B/T	Pos.	Height	Weight	Hometown	Year	Previous school
Daniel Blair	R/R	P	6’3	205	Peachtree City, GA	Senior	Winthrop
Skyler Messinger	R/R	IF	6’3	220	Niwot, CO	Senior	Kansas
Kimble Schuessler	R/R	C	6’2	205	Llano, TX	Sophomore	Texas A&M
Jack O’Dowd	L/R	IF	6’2	195	Nashville, TN	Sophomore	Vanderbilt
Zane Morehouse	R/R	P	6’4	200	Dawson, TX	Redshirt Sophomore	Dyersburg State
Jace Hutchins	R/R	P	6’5	220	College Station, TX	Redshirt Junior	Blinn
Preston Hoffart	R/R	C	5’11	190	Magnolia, TX	Redshirt Sophomore	Blinn
Marcus Olivarez	R/R	P	6’3	200	Columbus, TX	Senior	Lamar
Cameron Dayton	L/L	IF	6’3	207	Round Rock, TX	Senior	Midland

=== Recruits ===
Over the off-season, Texas signed 8 players to its 2021 signing class. Texas signed 5 pitchers, 1 first baseman, and 2 outfielders.

2021 Texas recruits
Name	B/T	Pos.	Height	Weight	Hometown	High School
Joshua Stewart	R/R	P	6’2	195	Georgetown, TX	St. Dominic Savio
Gavin Kash	L/R	1B	6’4	195	Sour Lake, TX	Monsignor Kelly
Jack Arthur	R/R	OF	6’2	196	Flower Mound, TX	Flower Mound
Alec Grossman	R/R	P	5’10	170	Austin, TX	Lake Travis
Luke Harrison	L/L	P	6’2	165	Friendswood, TX	Lutheran South Academy
Carson McKinney	R/R	P	6’4	220	Columbiana, AL	Briarwood Christian
Cameron O’Banan	R/R	P	6’1	185	Dripping Springs, TX	Dripping Springs
Ace Whitehead	L/L	OF	5’11	175	Lampasas, TX	Lampasas

=== 2021 MLB draft ===
At the conclusion of the 2021 season, Texas lost 6 players to the 2021 MLB draft. Texas ace Ty Madden was the 32nd pick in the first round. Other picks included outfielder Mike Antico picked in the 8th round, relief pitcher Cole Quintanilla picked in the 9th round, starting pitcher Kolby Kubichek picked in the 18th round, starting 3rd baseman Cam Williams picked in the 19th round, and starting 1st baseman Zach Zubia picked in the 20th round. At the end of the draft, Zach Zubia was the 307th player drafted in the history of the University of Texas.

Round	Pick	Player	Position	MLB team
#1	#32	Ty Madden	P	Detroit Tigers
#8	#241	Mike Antico	OF	St. Louis Cardinals
#9	#263	Cole Quintanilla	P	Washington Nationals
#18	#532	Kolby Kubichek	P	New York Mets
#19	#559	Cam Williams	IF	Kansas City Royals
#20	#599	Zach Zubia	IF	Miami Marlins

== Preseason ==
=== Award watch lists ===
Listed in the order that they were released

Award	Player	Position	Year
Golden Spikes Award	Pete Hansen	P	RS Sophomore
Golden Spikes Award	Tanner Witt	P	Sophomore

=== Big 12 media poll ===
Texas was ranked the #1 team in the Big 12 by members of conference media. The second ranked team, Oklahoma State, had 12 fewer votes than the Longhorns.

Big 12 media poll
Predicted finish	Team	Votes (1st place)
1	Texas	64 (8)
2	Oklahoma State	52 (1)
3	Texas Tech	49
4	TCU	48
5	Baylor	33
6	Oklahoma	25
7	Kansas State	23
8	West Virginia	20
9	Kansas	10

=== Preseason Big 12 awards and honors ===
Preseason Pitcher of the Year
Player	No.	Position	Class
Pete Hansen	33	P	RS Sophomore

Preseason All-Big 12 Team
Player	No.	Position	Class
Trey Faltine	0	IF	RS Sophomore
Silas Ardoin	4	C	RS Sophomore
Ivan Melendez^	17	IF	RS Junior
Mitchell Daly	19	IF	Sophomore
Pete Hansen	33	P	RS Sophomore
Tristan Stevens^	35	P	RS Senior
Aaron Nixon	41	P	Sophomore

^Ivan Melendez and Tristan Stevens were unanimous selections.

=== Preseason All-Americans ===
First Team All-Americans
Player	No.	Position	Class	Selector(s)
Ivan Melendez	17	IF	RS Junior	Collegiate Baseball; NCBWA
Pete Hansen	33	P	RS Sophomore	Collegiate Baseball; NCBWA
Aaron Nixon	41	P	Sophomore	D1Baseball; NCBWA

Second Team All-Americans
Player	No.	Position	Class	Selector(s)
Trey Faltine	0	IF	RS Sophomore	Collegiate Baseball
Tanner Witt	11	P	Sophomore	Collegiate Baseball
Ivan Melendez	17	IF	RS Junior	D1Baseball
Pete Hansen	33	P	RS Sophomore	D1Baseball
Tristan Stevens	35	P	RS Senior	Collegiate Baseball; NCBWA
Aaron Nixon	41	P	Sophomore	Collegiate Baseball

Third Team All-Americans
Player	No.	Position	Class	Selector(s)
Mitchell Daly	19	IF	Sophomore	Collegiate Baseball

== Schedule and results ==
2022 Texas Longhorns baseball game log (47–22)
Legend: = Win = Loss = Canceled Bold = Texas team member
Regular season (39–17)

February (8–0)
Date	Time (CT)	TV	Opponent	Rank	Stadium	Score	Win	Loss	Save	Attendance	Overall record	Big 12 Record	Box Score	Recap
February 18	6:30 p.m.	LHN	Rice*	No. 1	UFCU Disch–Falk Field • Austin, TX	**W** 7–0	**Hansen** **(1–0)**	Chandler (0–1)	—	7,355 (Note: Total Series Attendance: 21,580. Largest total attendance for 3 Game Opening Weekend series in UT History)	1–0	—	Box Score	Recap
February 19	2:30 p.m.	LHN	Rice*	No. 1	UFCU Disch–Falk Field • Austin, TX	**W** 15–1	**Stevens** **(1–0)**	Deskins (0–1)	—	7,186	2–0	—	Box Score	Recap
February 20	1:00 p.m.	LHN	Rice*	No. 1	UFCU Disch–Falk Field • Austin, TX	**W** 14–2	**Witt** **(1–0)**	Burbank (0–1)	—	7,039	3–0	—	Box Score	Recap
February 22	6:35 p.m.	IDN (Note: Islanders Digital Network)	at Texas A&M–Corpus Christi*	No. 1	Whataburger Field • Corpus Christi, TX	**W** 12–0	**Duplantier II** **(1–0)**	Thomas (0–1)	—	4,372	4–0	—	Box Score	Recap
February 23	4:05 p.m.	IDN	at Texas A&M–Corpus Christi*	No. 1	Whataburger Field • Corpus Christi, TX	**W** 5–4	**Blair** **(1–0)**	Garcia (0–1)	**Nixon** **(1)**	1,743	5–0	—	Box Score	Recap
February 25	4:30 p.m. (Note: Originally scheduled for 7:00 pm, moved up to 4:30 pm due to impending cold weather)	LHN	Alabama*	No. 1	UFCU Disch–Falk Field • Austin, TX	**W** 1–0	**Sthele** **(1–0)**	Ray (0–1)	**Nixon** **(2)**	6,361	6–0	—	Box Score	Recap
February 26	2:30 p.m. (Note: Originally scheduled for 1:30 pm, delayed due to rain)	LHN	Alabama*	No. 1	UFCU Disch–Falk Field • Austin, TX	**W** 2–0	**Stevens** **(2–0)**	Jean (0–1)	**Harrison** **(1)**	6,509	7–0	—	Box Score	Recap
February 27	1:00 p.m. (Note: Originally scheduled for 2:30 pm, moved up to 1:00 pm due to impending cold weather)	LHN	Alabama*	No. 1	UFCU Disch–Falk Field • Austin, TX	**W** 6–1	**Witt** **(2–0)**	Holman (0–1)	—	7,160	8–0	—	Box Score	Recap

March (11–8)
Date	Time (CT)	TV	Opponent	Rank	Stadium	Score	Win	Loss	Save	Attendance	Overall record	Big 12 Record	Box Score	Recap
March 1	6:30 p.m.	ESPN+	at Sam Houston State*	No. 1	Don Sanders Stadium • Huntsville, TX	**W** 10–2	**Duplantier II** **(2–0)**	Wesneski (1–1)	—	2,928 (Note: New Attendance record at Don Sanders Stadium)	9–0	—	Box Score	Recap
2022 Shriners Children's College Classic
March 4	8:30 p.m. (Note: Originally scheduled for 7:00 pm, delayed due to previous game going into extra innings)	ATTSN SW / MLB	vs. No. 17 Tennessee (Note: Neutral site, Texas is the designated home team)	No. 1	Minute Maid Park • Houston, TX	**W** 7–2	**Hansen** **(2–0)**	Sewell (2–1)	—	16,515	10–0	—	Box Score	Recap
March 5	7:00 p.m.	ATTSN SW / MLB	vs. No. 7 LSU (Note: Neutral site, Texas is the designated visiting team)	No. 1	Minute Maid Park • Houston, TX	**W** 6–1	**Stevens** **(3–0)**	Floyd (2–1)	**Harrison** **(2)**	24,787 (Note: 7th Largest D1 Baseball game attendance ever)	11–0	—	Box Score	Recap
March 6	3:30 p.m. (Note: Originally scheduled for 3:00 pm, delayed due to previous game)	ATTSN SW / MLB	vs. UCLA	No. 1	Minute Maid Park • Houston, TX	**L** 1–5	Austin (1–0)	**Johnson Jr.** **(0–1)**	Treadwell (2)	12,577	11–1	—	Box Score	Recap
March 8	6:00 p.m.	ESPN+	at Texas State*	No. 1	Bobcat Ballpark • San Marcos, TX	**W** 9–8	**Cobb** **(1–0)**	Sundgren (1–1)	**Nixon** **(3)**	3,283 (Note: New attendance record for Bobcat Ballpark)	12–1	—	Box Score	Recap
March 9	6:30 p.m.	LHN	Texas State*	No. 1	UFCU Disch–Falk Field • Austin, TX	**L** 4–6	Wofford (1–0)	**Blair** **(1–1)**	Stivors (4)	7,469	12–2	—	Box Score	Recap
March 11	12:00 p.m. (Note: Originally scheduled for 6:00 pm, moved up to 12:00 pm due to impending bad weather. Later postponed for a Sunday DH)	SECN+	at South Carolina*	No. 1	Founders Park • Columbia, SC	**Postponed** due to rain, rescheduled as doubleheader on Sunday, March 13								
March 12	12:00 p.m. (Note: Originally scheduled for 3:00 pm, moved up to 12:00 pm due to impending bad weather)	SECN	at South Carolina*	No. 1	Founders Park • Columbia, SC	**W** 9–5	**Hansen** **(3–0)**	Hall (0–2)	—	6,754	13–2	—	Box Score	Recap
March 13	12:30 p.m. (Note: Game 1 of Doubleheader)	SECN+	at South Carolina*	No. 1	Founders Park • Columbia, SC	**L** 2–4 (7) (Note: Game 1 of Doubleheader was 7 innings)	Sanders (3–0)	**Stevens** **(3–1)**	Braswell (3)	6,572	13–3	—	Box Score	Recap
March 13	3:30 p.m. (Note: Game 2 of Doubleheader, 45 minutes after conclusion of Game 1)	SECN+	at South Carolina*	No. 1	Founders Park • Columbia, SC	**L** 4–9	Becker (1–0)	**Gordon** **(0–1)**	—	6,010	13–4	—	Box Score	Recap
March 15	6:00 p.m.	FloBaseball	at College of Charleston*	No. 2	CofC Baseball Stadium at Patriots Point • Charleston, SC	**L** 4–8	Parris (2–0)	**Duplantier II** **(2–1)**	—	1,438	13–5	—	Box Score	Recap
March 16	6:00 p.m.	ESPN+	at The Citadel*	No. 2	Joseph P. Riley Jr. Park • Charleston, SC	**W** 18–4	**Sthele** **(2–0)**	Graf (0–2)	—	1,316	14–5	—	Box score	Recap
March 18	6:30 p.m.	LHN	UIW*	No. 2	UFCU Disch–Falk Field • Austin, TX	**W** 19–2	**Hansen** **(4–0)**	Garza (2–2)	—	6,516	15–5	—	Box score	Recap
March 19	2:30 p.m.	LHN	UIW*	No. 2	UFCU Disch–Falk Field • Austin, TX	**W** 10–2	**Stevens** **(4–1)**	Celestino (3–1)	—	7,458	16–5	—	Box score	Recap
March 20	1:00 p.m.	LHN	UIW*	No. 2	UFCU Disch–Falk Field • Austin, TX	**W** 12–0	**Gordon** **(1–1)**	Zavala (1–2)	—	6,786	17–5	—	Box score	Recap
March 22	6:30 p.m.	LHN	Central Arkansas*	No. 2	UFCU Disch–Falk Field • Austin, TX	**W** 7–2	**Eckhardt** **(1–0)**	Janak (0–1)	—	5,678	18–5	—	Box score	Recap
March 25	6:30 p.m.	ESPN+	at No. 16 Texas Tech	No. 2	Dan Law Field at Rip Griffin Park • Lubbock, TX	**L** 4–5 (10)	Sanders (1–0)	**Nixon** **(0–1)**	—	4,432	18–6	0–1	Box score	Recap
March 26	2:00 p.m.	ESPN+	at No. 16 Texas Tech	No. 2	Dan Law Field at Rip Griffin Park • Lubbock, TX	**L** 12–16 (10)	Bridges (1–0)	**Nixon** **(0–2)**	—	4,432	18–7	0–2	Box score	Recap
March 27	2:00 p.m.	ESPN+	at No. 16 Texas Tech	No. 2	Dan Law Field at Rip Griffin Park • Lubbock, TX	**W** 12–1 (7) (Note: Game ended after 7 innings due to run rule)	**Gordon** **(2–1)**	Molina (1–3)	—	4,432	19–7	1–2	Box score	Recap
March 29	6:30 p.m.	LHN	Texas A&M*; Lone Star Showdown	No. 8	UFCU Disch–Falk Field • Austin, TX	**L** 9–12	Hector (1–0)	**Southard** **(0–1)**	—	7,990 (Note: Largest regular season attendance at UFCU Disch-Falk Field to date)	19–8	—	Box Score	Recap

April (12–7)
Date	Time (CT)	TV	Opponent	Rank	Stadium	Score	Win	Loss	Save	Attendance	Overall record	Big 12 Record	Box Score	Recap
April 1	6:30 p.m.	SoonerSports.TV	vs. Oklahoma	No. 8	Globe Life Field (Note: Game originally scheduled for L. Dale Mitchell Baseball Park in Norman, OK but was relocated to Globe Life Field) • Arlington, TX	**W** 7–1	**Hansen** **(5–0)**	Bennett (2–1)	—	5,012	20–8	2–2	Box Score	Recap
April 2	12:00 p.m.	ESPN2	vs. Oklahoma	No. 8	Globe Life Field • Arlington, TX	**L** 2–4	Michael (2–0)	**Stevens** **(4–2)**	—	7,554	20–9	2–3	Box Score	Recap
April 3	12:00 p.m.	ESPNU	vs. Oklahoma	No. 8	Globe Life Field • Arlington, TX	**W** 12–8	**Cobb** **(2–0)**	Ramos (1–1)	—	6,518	21–9	3–3	Box Score	Recap
April 5	6:30 p.m.	LHN	UTRGV*	No. 7	UFCU Disch–Falk Field • Austin, TX	**W** 13–5	**Southard** **(1–1)**	Balderrama Jr. (1–2)	—	5,989	22–9	—	Box Score	Recap
April 8	6:30 p.m.	LHN	No. 23 TCU	No. 7	UFCU Disch–Falk Field • Austin, TX	**W** 2–0	**Hansen** **(6–0)**	Cornelio (3–2)	—	7,482	23–9	4–3	Box Score	Recap
April 9	5:00 p.m.	ESPNU	No. 23 TCU	No. 7	UFCU Disch–Falk Field • Austin, TX	**L** 5–7	Bolden (3–0)	**Stevens** **(4–3)**	Ridings (9)	7,323	23–10	4–4	Box Score	Recap
April 10	12:00 p.m.	ESPNU	No. 23 TCU	No. 7	UFCU Disch–Falk Field • Austin, TX	**W** 7–3	**Sthele** **(3–0)**	Walker (3–2)	—	7,106	24–10	5–4	Box Score	Recap
April 12	6:30 p.m.	LHN	Stephen F. Austin*	No. 7	UFCU Disch–Falk Field • Austin, TX	**W** 13–2	**Blair** **(2–1)**	Walters (0–1)	—	6,126	25–10	—	Box Score	Recap
April 14	6:00 p.m.	ESPN+	at Kansas State	No. 7	Tointon Family Stadium • Manhattan, KS	**L** 5–8	Neighbors (1–0)	**Hansen** **(6–1)**	McCullough (1)	1,852	25–11	5–5	Box Score	Recap
April 15	6:00 p.m.	ESPN+	at Kansas State	No. 7	Tointon Family Stadium • Manhattan, KS	**L** 1–8	Adams (4–4)	**Stevens** **(4–4)**	—	1,666	25–12	5–6	Box Score	Recap
April 16	4:00 p.m.	ESPN+	at Kansas State	No. 7	Tointon Family Stadium • Manhattan, KS	**W** 4–2	**Gordon** **(3–1)**	Corsentino (2–4)	**Nixon** **(4)**	2,180	26–12	6–6	Box Score	Recap
April 19	6:30 p.m.	LHN	Air Force*	No. 10	UFCU Disch–Falk Field • Austin, TX	**L** 2–14	Martin (2–2)	**Eckhardt** **(1–1)**	—	5,934	26–13	—	Box Score	Recap
April 20	4:00 p.m.	LHN	Air Force*	No. 10	UFCU Disch–Falk Field • Austin, TX	**W** 12–10	**Nixon** **(1–2)**	Hawks (0–3)	—	5,653	27–13	—	Box Score	Recap
April 22	6:30 p.m.	LHN	Baylor	No. 10	UFCU Disch–Falk Field • Austin, TX	**W** (Note: David Pierce's 200th win at Texas); 20–1	**Hansen** **(7–1)**	Rigney (2–2)	—	7,300	28–13	7–6	Box Score	Recap
April 23	1:00 p.m.	LHN	Baylor	No. 10	UFCU Disch–Falk Field • Austin, TX	**W** 13–4	**Stevens** **(5–4)**	Andrade (3–2)	—	7,177	29–13	8–6	Box Score	Recap
April 24	1:00 p.m.	LHN	Baylor	No. 10	UFCU Disch–Falk Field • Austin, TX	**W** 13–4	**Gordon** **(4–1)**	Thomas (4–4)	—	7,063	30–13	9–6	Box Score	Recap
April 26	6:30 p.m.	ESPN+	at UTRGV*	No. 10	UTRGV Baseball Stadium • Edinburg, TX (Note: UT's first trip to UTRGV/Edinburg since 1971 when UTRGV was UT Pan American)	**W** (Note: David Pierce's 400th Career Win as a head coach); 7–2	**Morehouse** **(1–0)**	Garza (1–1)	—	6,418 (Note: All-time paid attendance record of 6,418 for UTRGV Baseball Stadium, there were many more sitting beyond the outfield fence that were not part of the official attendance)	31–13	—	Box Score	Recap
April 29	6:30 p.m.	LHN	No. 8 Oklahoma State	No. 10	UFCU Disch–Falk Field • Austin, TX	**L** 6–8	Martin (2–2)	**Nixon** **(1–3)**	McLean (3)	7,202	31–14	9–7	Box Score	Recap
April 30	2:30 p.m.	LHN	No. 8 Oklahoma State	No. 10	UFCU Disch–Falk Field • Austin, TX	**L** 3–14	Osmond (4–1)	**Stevens** **(5–5)**	Morrill (1)	7,134	31–15	9–8	Box Score	Recap

May (8–2)
Date	Time (CT)	TV	Opponent	Rank	Stadium	Score	Win	Loss	Save	Attendance	Overall record	Big 12 Record	Box Score	Recap
May 1	1:00 p.m.	LHN	No. 8 Oklahoma State	No. 10	UFCU Disch–Falk Field • Austin, TX	**L** 8–10	Phansalkar (4–2)	**Cobb** **(2–1)**	McLean (4)	7,139	31–16	9–9	Box Score	Recap
May 3	6:30 p.m.	LHN	Houston Baptist*	—	UFCU Disch–Falk Field • Austin, TX	**W** 13–3 (7)	**Morehouse** **(2–0)**	Tinker (0–5)	—	5,936	32–16	—	Box Score	Recap
May 6	6:30 p.m.	ESPN+	at West Virginia	—	Monongalia County Ballpark • Morgantown, WV	**Postponed** due to rain, rescheduled as doubleheader on Saturday, May 7								
May 7	1:00 p.m.	ESPN+	at West Virginia	—	Monongalia County Ballpark • Morgantown, WV	**W** 5–2	**Hansen** **(8–1)**	Watters (2–5)	**Stevens** **(1)**	3,091	33–16	10–9	Box Score	Recap
May 7	4:30 p.m.	ESPN+	at West Virginia	—	Monongalia County Ballpark • Morgantown, WV	**W** 11–0 (7)	**Gordon** **(5–1)**	Hampton (6–4)	—	3,213	34–16	11–9	Box Score	Recap
May 8	12:00 p.m.	ESPN+	at West Virginia	—	Monongalia County Ballpark • Morgantown, WV	**L** 6–8	Braithwaite (3–0)	**Stevens** **(5–5)**	Short (2)	2,833	34–17	11–10	Box Score	Recap
May 10	6:30 p.m.	LHN	Texas Southern*	No. 22	UFCU Disch–Falk Field • Austin, TX	**W** 12–2	**Olivarez** **(1–0)**	Gordon (3–2)	—	5,760	35–17	—	Box Score	Recap
May 17	6:30 p.m.	LHN	Sam Houston State*	No. 22	UFCU Disch–Falk Field • Austin, TX	**W** 9–2	**Morehouse** **(3–0)**	Rudis (0–5)	—	6,341	36–17	—	Box Score	Recap
May 19	6:30 p.m.	LHN	Kansas	No. 22	UFCU Disch–Falk Field • Austin, TX	**W** 12–4	**Hansen** **(9–1)**	Hegarty (6–6)	—	6,266	37–17	12–10	Box Score	Recap
May 20	6:30 p.m.	LHN	Kansas	No. 22	UFCU Disch–Falk Field • Austin, TX	**W** 8–1 (Note: Ivan Melendez hits his 28th home run, tying Kyle Russell for the Texas single season home run record)	**Gordon** **(6–1)**	Larsen (1–9)	—	6,963	38–17	13–10	Box Score	Recap
May 21	2:30 p.m.	LHN	Kansas	No. 22	UFCU Disch–Falk Field • Austin, TX	**W** 11–6	**Southard** **(2–1)**	Dougan (1–3)	**Nixon** **(6)**	7,297	39–17	14–10	Box Score	Recap

Postseason (8–5)

Big 12 tournament (3–2)
Date	Time (CT)	TV	Opponent	(Seed) Rank	Stadium	Score	Win	Loss	Save	Attendance	Overall record	Tournament record	Box Score	Recap
May 25	9:00 a.m.	ESPNU	vs. (4) No. 9 Oklahoma State	(5) No. 19	Globe Life Field • Arlington, TX	**W** 4–0	**Hansen** **(10–1)**	Mederos (3–4)	**Stevens** **(2)**	—	40–17	1–0	Box Score	Recap; Photos
May 26	4:15 p.m. (Note: Originally scheduled for 4:00 pm, delayed due to previous game of tournament)	ESPNU	vs. (1) No. 18 TCU	(5) No. 19	Globe Life Field • Arlington, TX	**W** 5–3	**Gordon** **(7–1)**	Perez (6–3)	**Stevens** **(3)**	—	41–17	2–0	Box Score	Recap; Photos
May 28	9:00 a.m.	ESPN+	vs. (4) No. 9 Oklahoma State	(5) No. 19	Globe Life Field • Arlington, TX	**L** 1–8	Bogusz (3–0)	**Morehouse** **(3–1)**	—	—	41–18	2–1	Box Score	Recap
May 28	4:15 p.m. (Note: Originally scheduled for 4:00 pm, delayed due to previous game of tournament)	ESPN+	vs. (4) No. 9 Oklahoma State	(5) No. 19	Globe Life Field • Arlington, TX	**W** 9–2	**Southard** **(3–1)**	Morrill (1–3)	—	8,317	42–18	3–1	Box Score	Recap; Photos
May 29	5:00 p.m.	ESPNU	vs. (3) No. 22 Oklahoma; Tournament championship Game	(5) No. 19	Globe Life Field • Arlington, TX	**L** 1–8 (Note: Ivan Melendez hits his 29th home run, passing Kyle Russell for the Texas single season home run record)	Horton (3–2)	**Sthele** **(3–1)**	—	10,308	42–19	3–2	Box Score	Recap

NCAA Austin Regional (3–0)
Date	Time (CT)	TV	Opponent	Seed	Stadium	Score	Win	Loss	Save	Attendance	Overall record	Regional Record	Box Score	Recap
June 3	1:00 p.m.	LHN	(4) Air Force	(1) No. 16	UFCU Disch–Falk Field • Austin, TX	**W** 11–3	**Hansen** **(11–1)**	Skenes (10–3)	—	7,695	43–19	1–0	Box Score	Recap; Photos
June 4	6:00 p.m.	LHN	(2) Louisiana Tech	(1) No. 16	UFCU Disch–Falk Field • Austin, TX	**W** 5–2 (Note: Texas Longhorns' 250th NCAA tournament Win)	**Stevens** **(6–6)**	Crigger (6–3)	—	8,502 (Note: Largest attendance to date for a collegiate game at UFCU Disch-Falk Field)	44–19	2–0	Box Score	Recap; Photos
June 5	7:00 p.m.	LHN	vs. (4) Air Force; Regional Final	(1) No. 16	UFCU Disch–Falk Field • Austin, TX	**W** 10–1	**Southard** **(4–1)**	Fairburn (0–2	—	8,325	45–19	3–0	Box Score	Recap; Photos

NCAA Greenville Super Regional (2–1)
Date	Time (CT)	TV	Opponent	National seed	Stadium	Score	Win	Loss	Save	Attendance	Overall record	Super regional record	Box Score	Recap
June 10	11:00 a.m.	ESPN2	at (8) No. 10 East Carolina	(9) No. 16	Clark–LeClair Stadium • Greenville, NC	**L** 7–13	Mayhue (6–1)	**Hansen** **(11–2)**	Agnos (3)	5,723 (Note: 5,723 sets the new all-time attendance record to date for Clark–LeClair Stadium)	45–20	0–1	Box Score	Recap
June 11	11:00 a.m.	ESPN2	vs. (8) No. 10 East Carolina	(9) No. 16	Clark–LeClair Stadium • Greenville, NC	**W** 9–8	**Duplantier II** **(3–1)**	Lunsford-Shenkman (1–1)	—	5,807 (Note: 5,807 sets the new all-time attendance record to date for Clark–LeClair Stadium, breaking the record of 5,723 set the day before)	46–20	1–1	Box Score	Recap; Photos
June 12	4:00 p.m. (Note: Game was originally scheduled to start at 3:00 pm CT but was delayed to 4:00 pm due to a lightning delay. With 1 out in the top of the 1st inning and Texas up 4–0, the game was again delayed due to lightning, The game resumed at 9:15 pm.)	ESPN2 (Note: Originally scheduled for ESPN2, due to weather delay the game started on ESPNews. After the second weather delay the game restarted on ESPNU before finishing on ESPN2)	at (8) No. 10 East Carolina	(9) No. 16	Clark–LeClair Stadium • Greenville, NC	**W** 11–1	**Stevens** **(7–6)**	Beal (5–2)	—	5,787	47–20	2–0	Box Score	Recap; Photos

College World Series (0–2)
Date	Time (CT)	TV	Opponent	National seed	Stadium	Score	Win	Loss	Save	Attendance	Overall record	CWS record	Box Score	Recap
June 17	6:00 p.m.	ESPN	No. 17 Notre Dame	(9) No. 16	Charles Schwab Field Omaha • Omaha, NE	**L** 3–7	Bertrand (10–3)	**Hansen** **(11–3)**	Findlay (4)	25,134	47–21	0–1	Box Score	Recap; Photos
June 19	1:00 p.m.	ESPN	vs. (5) No. 5 Texas A&M; Lone Star Showdown	(9) No. 16	Charles Schwab Field Omaha • Omaha, NE	**L** 2–10	Dallas (7–3)	**Gordon** **(7–2)**	—	24,056	47–22	0–2	Box Score	Recap; Photos

* indicates a non-conference game. All rankings from D1Baseball on the date of the contest. Source:

Schedule Notes

== Postseason ==
=== Big 12 tournament ===
First Round; May 25
1	TCU	4
8	Baylor	2
4	Oklahoma State	0
5	Texas	4
8	Baylor	1
4	Oklahoma State	11^{7}
3	Oklahoma	6
6	West Virginia	4
2	Texas Tech	5
7	Kansas State	3
6	West Virginia	5
7	Kansas State	8

Second Round; May 26–May 27
1	TCU	3
5	Texas	5
1	TCU	4
4	Oklahoma State	8
3	Oklahoma	6
2	Texas Tech	3
2	Texas Tech	5
7	Kansas State	6^{11}

Semifinals; May 28
5	Texas	1	9
4	Oklahoma State	8	2
3	Oklahoma	4	-
7	Kansas State	3	-

Finals; May 29
5	Texas	1
3	Oklahoma	8

=== NCAA tournament ===
Regional	Regional
1	East Carolina	17
4	Coppin State	1
1	East Carolina	4
2	Virginia	2
3	Coastal Carolina	2
2	Virginia	7
Greenville Regional – Clark–LeClair Stadium
4	Coppin State	8
3	Coastal Carolina	10
3	Coastal Carolina	7
2	Virginia	6
1	Texas	11
4	Air Force	3
1	Texas	5
2	Louisiana Tech	2
3	Dallas Baptist	5
2	Louisiana Tech	12
Austin Regional – UFCU Disch–Falk Field
4	Air Force	5
3	Dallas Baptist	1
4	Air Force	9
2	Louisiana Tech	7

Regional Final
1	East Carolina	1	13
3	Coastal Carolina	9	4
1	Texas	10	–
4	Air Force	1	–

Super Regional
8	East Carolina	13	8	1
9	Texas	7	9	11

==== College World Series ====
First round	Second round
Notre Dame	7
9	Texas	3
Notre Dame	2
Oklahoma	6
5	Texas A&M	8
Oklahoma	13
Bracket 1
9	Texas	2
5	Texas A&M	10
5	Texas A&M	5
Notre Dame	1
2	Stanford	2
Arkansas	17
Arkansas	5
Ole Miss	13
Ole Miss	5
14	Auburn	1
Bracket 2
2	Stanford	2
14	Auburn	6
14	Auburn	1
Arkansas	11

Semifinals
Oklahoma	5	–
5	Texas A&M	1	–
Ole Miss	2	2
Arkansas	3	0

Finals
Oklahoma	3	2	–
Ole Miss	10	4	–

== Statistics ==
=== Team batting ===
Team	AB	Avg.	H	2B	3B	HR	RBI	BB	SO	SB
Texas	2396	.314	753	157	12	128	505	319	545	55
Opponents	2257	.241	545	96	8	66	281	245	606	42

=== Team pitching ===
Team	IP	H	R	ER	BB	SO	SV	ERA
Texas	603.1	545	311	287	245	606	10	4.28
Opponents	588	753	541	491	319	545	11	7.52

=== Individual batting ===
Note: leaders must meet the minimum requirement of 2 PA/G and 75% of games played

Player	GP	AB	Avg.	H	2B	3B	HR	RBI	BB	SO	SB
Ivan Melendez	67	248	.387	96	18	2	32	94	52	51	1
Murphy Stehly	68	278	.367	102	23	1	19	61	17	43	8
Skyler Messinger	67	250	.364	91	14	1	11	59	18	58	1
Douglas Hodo III	69	282	.319	90	26	2	10	47	42	74	9
Trey Faltine	69	241	.282	68	18	1	15	56	33	104	6
Silas Ardoin	69	240	.271	65	20	1	12	50	39	46	1
Dylan Campbell	65	176	.267	47	8	1	10	29	29	36	14
Mitchell Daly	67	207	.237	49	13	1	4	37	32	47	4
Ace Whitehead	25	18	.556	10	2	0	0	2	3	5	0
Kimble Schuessler	17	20	.350	7	0	0	1	4	3	6	0
Austin Todd	51	187	.332	62	8	1	6	31	23	20	1
Eric Kennedy	45	170	.300	51	6	1	7	29	20	31	10
Peyton Powell	6	8	.250	2	0	0	0	0	1	4	0
Jack O'Dowd	21	39	.231	9	0	0	1	5	6	6	0
Gavin Kash	16	23	.174	4	1	0	0	0	1	9	0
Cam Constantine	10	7	.000	0	0	0	0	1	0	4	0
Cameron Dayton	5	2	.000	0	0	0	0	0	0	1	0

=== Individual pitching ===
Note: leaders must meet the minimum requirement of 1 IP/G

Player	GP	GS	W	L	IP	H	R	ER	BB	SO	SV	ERA
Marcus Olivarez	19	0	1	0	26.0	16	2	2	13	21	0	0.69
Tanner Witt	2	2	2	0	11.0	9	2	2	3	14	0	1.64
Jared Southard	25	0	4	1	29.1	15	12	9	19	46	0	2.76
Lucas Gordon	18	16	7	2	85.2	71	36	29	26	77	0	3.05
Luke Harrison	32	1	0	0	35.1	34	13	12	16	32	2	3.06
Pete Hansen	17	17	11	3	107.2	94	47	45	19	120	0	3.76
Coy Cobb	15	0	2	1	15.2	14	8	8	2	10	0	4.60
Joshua Stewart	10	1	0	0	11.2	13	6	6	8	13	0	4.63
Tristan Stevens	26	12	7	6	85.2	90	49	45	24	72	3	4.73
Aaron Nixon	26	0	1	3	30.1	24	18	17	25	38	5	5.04
Andre Duplantier II	17	6	3	1	30.1	28	21	20	17	25	0	5.93
Zane Morehouse	20	6	3	1	39.0	39	27	26	16	43	0	6.00
Travis Sthele	21	3	3	1	34.1	34	23	23	19	32	0	6.03
Daniel Blair	12	0	2	1	15.2	18	14	13	13	17	0	7.47
Justin Eckhardt	11	5	1	1	25.1	30	23	23	12	23	0	8.17
Cameron Dayton	3	0	0	0	1.1	0	0	0	1	2	0	0.00
Sam Walbridge	3	0	0	0	1.1	1	0	0	1	0	0	0.00
Lebarron Johnson Jr.	18	0	0	1	17.0	12	9	6	11	21	0	3.18
Ace Whitehead	1	0	0	0	0.2	3	1	1	0	0	0	13.50

Legend
GP	Games played	GS	Games started	AB	At-bats
H	Hits	Avg.	Batting average	2B	Doubles
3B	Triples	HR	Home runs	RBI	Runs batted in
IP	Innings pitched	W	Wins	L	Losses
ERA	Earned run average	SO	Strikeouts	BB	Base on balls
SV	Saves	SB	Stolen bases	High	Team high

== Awards and honors ==
National honors
Honors	Player	Position	Ref.
Golden Spikes Award	Ivan Melendez	1B	
Dick Howser Trophy National Player of the Year	Ivan Melendez	1B	
D1Baseball Player Of The Year	Ivan Melendez	1B	
Baseball America College Player of the Year Award	Ivan Melendez	1B	
ABCA Player of the Year	Ivan Melendez	1B	
Perfect Game/Rawlings Player of the Year	Ivan Melendez	1B	
Bobby Bragan Collegiate Slugger Award	Ivan Melendez	1B	
Collegiate Baseball National Player of the Year	Ivan Melendez	IF	
Collegiate Baseball First Team All-American	Ivan Melendez	IF	
Collegiate Baseball Second Team All-American	Pete Hansen	P	
Collegiate Baseball Second Team All-American	Murphy Stehly	OF	
NCAA Austin Regional Most Valuable Player	Skyler Messinger	3B	
NCAA Austin Regional All-Tournament Team	Ivan Melendez	1B	
NCAA Austin Regional All-Tournament Team	Skyler Messinger	3B	
NCAA Austin Regional All-Tournament Team	Trey Faltine	SS	
NCAA Austin Regional All-Tournament Team	Murphy Stehly	OF	
NCAA Austin Regional All-Tournament Team	Dylan Campbell	OF	
NCAA Austin Regional All-Tournament Team	Austin Todd	DH	
NCAA Austin Regional All-Tournament Team	Tristan Stevens	P	
ABCA First Team All-American	Ivan Melendez	1B	
ABCA Second Team All-American	Pete Hansen	P	
ABCA Second Team All-American	Murphy Stehly	OF	
NCBWA First Team All-American	Ivan Melendez	1B	
NCBWA Third Team All-American	Pete Hansen	P	
NCBWA Third Team All-American	Murphy Stehly	OF	
D1Baseball First Team All-American	Ivan Melendez	1B	
D1Baseball Third Team All-American	Murphy Stehly	OF	

Conference honors
Honors	Player	Position	Ref.
Big 12 Player of the Year	Ivan Melendez	IF	
All-Big 12 First Team	Pete Hansen	P	
All-Big 12 First Team	Ivan Melendez	IF	
All-Big 12 First Team	Silas Ardoin	C	
All-Big 12 First Team	Murphy Stehly	OF	
All-Big 12 Second Team	Trey Faltine	IF	
All-Big 12 Second Team	Skyler Messinger	IF	
All-Big 12 Second Team	Lucas Gordon	P	
All-Big 12 Third Team	Austin Todd	OF	
All-Big 12 Third Team	Douglas Hodo III	OF	
Big 12 All-Tournament Team	Skyler Messinger	3B	
Big 12 All-Tournament Team	Douglas Hodo III	OF	
Big 12 All-Tournament Team	Pete Hansen	P	

Weekly honors
Honors	Player	Position	Date Awarded	Ref.
Big 12 Player of the Week	Ivan Melendez	IF	March 14, 2022	
Big 12 Player of the Week	Murphy Stehly	IF	March 21, 2022	
Big 12 Player of the Week	Ivan Melendez	IF	March 28, 2022	
Big 12 Player of the Week	Ivan Melendez	IF	April 25, 2022	
Big 12 Player of the Week	Ivan Melendez	IF	May 9, 2022	
Big 12 Player of the Week	Ivan Melendez	IF	May 23, 2022	
Big 12 Pitcher of the Week	Pete Hansen	P	April 4, 2022	
Big 12 Pitcher of the Week	Pete Hansen	P	April 11, 2022	
Golden Spikes Performance of the Week	Pete Hansen	P	April 13, 2022	
Collegiate Baseball National Player of the Week	Ivan Melendez	IF	April 25, 2022	
NCBWA Dick Howser Trophy National Player of the Week	Ivan Melendez	IF	May 10, 2022	
Perfect Game National Player of the Week	Ivan Melendez	IF	May 10, 2022	

Monthly honors
Honors	Player	Position	Date Awarded	Ref.
Dick Howser Trophy National Player of the Month	Ivan Melendez	IF	April 4, 2022	

== Rankings ==
Ranking movements Legend: ██ Increase in ranking ██ Decrease in ranking — = Not ranked
	Week																		
Poll	Pre	1	2	3	4	5	6	7	8	9	10	11	12	13	14	15	16	17	Final
Coaches'	1	1*	1	1	2	3	8	6	7	7	6	20	18	20	17	12	12*	12*	8
Baseball America	1	1	1	1	4	3	10	8	8	20	18	—	—	—	24	13	13*	13*	9
Collegiate Baseball^	1	1	1	1	6	4	7	11	10	18	20	—	—	—	—	17	10	5	7
NCBWA†	1	1	1	1	3	4	7	8	6	7	7	18	19	17	16	8	7	7*	8
D1Baseball	1	1	1	1	2	2	8	7	7	10	10	—	22	22	19	16	16*	16*	8

^ Collegiate Baseball ranked 40 teams in their preseason poll, but only ranked 30 teams weekly during the season.
† NCBWA ranks 30 teams in their preseason poll, but only ranks 25 teams weekly during the season.
* A new poll was not released for this week, so for comparison purposes, the previous week's ranking is inserted in this week's slot.
