= Scott Malone (baseball) =

American college baseball coach (born 1971)

Current position
- Title: Head coach
- Team: Texas A&M–Corpus Christi
- Conference: Southland
- Record: 465–547

Biographical details
- Born: April 16, 1971 (age 55); Longview, Texas, U.S.

Playing career
- 1990–1992: TCU
- 1992: Butte Copper Kings
- 1993: Charleston Rainbows
- 1994–1995: Port Charlotte Rangers
- 1996: Abilene Prairie Dogs
- Position: First baseman / Outfielder

Coaching career (HC unless noted)
- 1997–1998: McMurry (asst.)
- 1999: TCU (asst.)
- 2000: Kentucky (asst.)
- 2001–2002: UTSA (asst.)
- 2003–2004: UT Arlington (asst.)
- 2005–2007: UNLV (asst.)
- 2008–present: Texas A&M–Corpus Christi

Head coaching record
- Overall: 465–547
- Tournaments: Southland: 14–21; NCAA: 0–0

Andrew Scott Malone (born April 16, 1971) is an American college baseball coach and former first baseman. Malone is the head coach of the Texas A&M–Corpus Christi Islanders baseball team.

== Playing career ==
Malone attended Cooper High School in Abilene, Texas. Malone played for the school's varsity baseball team under the direction of his father, Andy. Malone then enrolled at the Texas Christian University (TCU), to play college baseball for the TCU Horned Frogs baseball team.

As a freshman at Texas Christian University in 1990, Malone had a .358 batting average, a .408 on-base percentage (OBP) and a .516 SLG. He was one of the Southwest Conference's best hitters.

In the 1992 season as a junior, Malone hit 7 home runs and 17 doubles.

In 2012, Malone was elected into the Texas Christian University Athletics Hall of Fame.

== Coaching career ==
On July 23, 2004, Malone was named an assistant coach at UNLV.

On July 2, 2007, Malone was named the head coach of the Texas A&M–Corpus Christi Islanders baseball program.

== Head coaching record ==
Record table
Season	Team	Overall	Conference	Standing	Postseason
Texas A&M–Corpus Christi Islanders (Southland Conference) (2008–present)
2008	Texas A&M–Corpus Christi	24–33	14–16	5th (Western)	Southland Tournament
2009	Texas A&M–Corpus Christi	18–38	9–21	12th	
2010	Texas A&M–Corpus Christi	20–34	10–23	T-11th	
2011	Texas A&M–Corpus Christi	37–24	19–14	3rd	Southland Tournament
2012	Texas A&M–Corpus Christi	24–33	14–19	8th	Southland Tournament
2013	Texas A&M–Corpus Christi	33–25	17–10	2nd	Southland Tournament
2014	Texas A&M–Corpus Christi	31–27	19–12	T-3rd	Southland Tournament
2015	Texas A&M–Corpus Christi	26–27	13–14	8th	Southland Tournament
2016	Texas A&M–Corpus Christi	19–32	8–20	11th	
2017	Texas A&M–Corpus Christi	22–32	14–16	10th	
2018	Texas A&M–Corpus Christi	30–26	14–16	T-7th	
2019	Texas A&M–Corpus Christi	31–26	14–16	8th	Southland Tournament
2020	Texas A&M–Corpus Christi	8–10	2–1		Season canceled due to COVID-19
2021	Texas A&M–Corpus Christi	25–29	20–14	2nd	Southland Tournament
2022	Texas A&M–Corpus Christi	27–28	10–14	7th	Southland Tournament
2023	Texas A&M–Corpus Christi	24–30	12–12	T-5th	Southland Tournament
2024	Texas A&M–Corpus Christi	22–35	10–14	8th	Southland Tournament
2025	Texas A&M–Corpus Christi	21–31	12–18	T–7th	Southland Tournament
2026	Texas A&M–Corpus Christi	23–27	11–18	10th	
Texas A&M–Corpus Christi:		465–547	242–288		
Total:		465–547			
National champion Postseason invitational champion Conference regular season champion Conference regular season and conference tournament champion Division regular season champion Division regular season and conference tournament champion Conference tournament champion

== See also ==
- List of current NCAA Division I baseball coaches
