= Chapman Field (baseball) =

Sports venue in Corpus Christi, Texas, US

- Interactive map of Chapman Field
- Location: Corpus Christi, Texas
- Coordinates: 27°42′36.2″N 97°19′27.4″W
- Owner: Texas A&M University–Corpus Christi
- Operator: Texas A&M University–Corpus Christi
- Capacity: Baseball: 750; Softball: 200
- Surface: Grass
- Field size: Baseball: Left Field: 330 ft Center Field: 404 ft Right Field: 330 ft Softball: Left Field: 200 ft Center Field: 220 ft Right Field: 200 ft

Construction
- Opened: 2002
- Renovated: 2011–12

Tenants
- Texas A&M–Corpus Christi Islanders baseball Texas A&M–Corpus Christi Islanders softball (NCAA) (2002-Present)

Chapman Field is located in Corpus Christi, Texas. The facility has both a baseball field, home to the Texas A&M–Corpus Christi Islanders baseball team and a softball field, home to the Texas A&M–Corpus Christi Islanders softball team. The facility was renamed after John and Louise Chapman before the beginning of the 2007 baseball season. Whataburger Field is used instead of Chapman Field for some baseball early season tournaments and also some big matchups (i.e. Texas A&M or Rice).

Major renovations to both fields were made in 2011 and 2012. Renovations included new bleachers, new lighting for baseball, a new field surfaces, new irrigation, new bullpens, as well as windscreens around the fence. The baseball bleacher system was replaced and the old system was moved to the softball field.

== See also ==
- List of NCAA Division I baseball venues
