= 2024 Texas Longhorns baseball team =

College Baseball Season

2024 Texas Longhorns baseball

NCAA College Station Regional, 1–2
- Conference: Big 12 Conference
- Record: 36–24 (20–10 Big 12)
- Head coach: David Pierce (8th season)
- Associate head coach: Philip Miller (8th season)
- Assistant coaches: Steve Rodriguez (2nd season); Caleb Longley (3rd season)
- Home stadium: UFCU Disch–Falk Field

2024 Big 12 Conference baseball standings
	Conf.				Overall
Team	W		L	PCT	W		L	PCT
No. 18 Oklahoma ‍†‍‍^{y}	23	–	7	.767	40	–	21	.656
No. 21 Oklahoma State ‍‍‡‍^{y}	19	–	9	.679	42	–	19	.689
Texas ‍‍‍^{y}	20	–	10	.667	36	–	24	.600
No. 13 West Virginia ‍‍‍^{y}	19	–	11	.633	36	–	24	.600
Cincinnati ‍‍‍	17	–	13	.567	32	–	25	.561
No. 14 Kansas State ‍‍‍^{y}	15	–	15	.500	35	–	26	.574
Kansas ‍‍‍	15	–	15	.500	31	–	23	.574
UCF ‍‍‍^{y}	14	–	15	.483	37	–	21	.638
TCU ‍‍‍	14	–	16	.467	33	–	21	.611
Texas Tech ‍‍‍	12	–	17	.414	33	–	26	.559
Baylor ‍‍‍	10	–	20	.333	22	–	31	.415
Houston ‍‍‍	7	–	21	.250	26	–	28	.481
BYU ‍‍‍	7	–	23	.233	21	–	31	.404
† – Conference champion ‡ – Tournament champion y – Invited to the NCAA tournament As of June 26, 2024; Rankings from D1baseball

The 2024 Texas Longhorns baseball team represented the University of Texas at Austin during the 2024 NCAA Division I baseball season. The Longhorns played their home games at UFCU Disch–Falk Field as a member of the Big 12 Conference. They were led by head coach David Pierce, in his 8th season at Texas. The team closed out the Longhorns' run in the Big 12 entirely, being the last to represent the school before UT–Austin transfers to the Southeastern Conference on July 1, 2024 with the start of the new academic year.

== Previous season ==
Texas finished the 2023 season with a 42-22 record, 15-9 in Big 12 play. The Longhorns 15-9 conference record earned them a big-12 co-conference championship. Texas made it all the way to the super regional before being beat out to finish the 2023 season.

== Personnel ==
=== Roster ===
2024 Texas Longhorns roster
Pitchers: 11 – Tanner Witt – (redshirt) Junior (6'6, 230); 17 – Easton Tumis – Freshman (6'4, 155); 24 – Chase Lummus – (redshirt) Junior (6'1, 205); 28 – Ace Whitehead (Note: Plays two different positions) – Junior (5'10, 195); 32 – Charlie Hurley – Senior (6'8, 225); 34 – Will Mercer – (redshirt) Senior (6'1, 210); 36 – David Shaw – Junior (6'7, 200); 38 – Max Grubbs – Sophomore (6'1, 200); 41 – Cody Howard – (redshirt) Sophomore (6'1, 200); 45 – Heston Tole – Senior (6’6, 230); 46 – Cole Selvig – Freshman (6'0, 205); 47 – George Zaharias – Freshman (6'3, 220); 48 – Hudson Hamilton – Freshman (6'1, 210); 49 – Oliver Santos – (redshirt) Freshman (6'4, 205); 53 – Luke Harrison – (redshirt) Sophomore (6'2, 205); 54 – Brandon Bertsch – Freshman (6'0, 170); 56 – Gage Boehm – (redshirt) Freshman (6'5, 255); 57 – Lebarron Johnson Jr. – (redshirt) Junior (6'4, 210); 88 – Andre Duplantier II – (redshirt) Junior (6'2, 215); 99 – Grant Fontenot – (redshirt) Sophomore (6'3, 225)	Catchers: 6 – Rylan Galvan – Sophomore (6'0, 205); 10 – Kimble Schuessler – (redshirt) Junior (6'2, 210); 37 – Nik Sanders – Freshman (6'2, 215); 42 – Oliver Service – Freshman (6'0, 195); Infielders: 0 – Jayden Duplantier – Sophomore (6’1, 190); 1 – Jalin Flores – Sophomore (6’2, 210); 9 – Jared Thomas – Sophomore (6’2, 190); 14 – Cade O’Hara – Sophomore (5'11, 180); 19 – Sam Ardoin – Freshman (6'1, 170); 27 – Jack O’Dowd – Senior (6'2, 210); 30 – Dee Kennedy – Freshman (5'11, 185); 31 – Casey Borba – Freshman (6'1, 210)	Outfielders: 4 – Porter Brown – (redshirt) Senior (5'11, 205); 8 – Will Gasparino – Freshman (6'6, 210); 9 – Jared Thomas – Sophomore (6’2, 190); 28 – Ace Whitehead – Junior (5'10, 195); 40 – Blake Peterson – Freshman (6'1, 210); 42 – Oliver Service – Freshman (6'0, 195); 43 – Tommy Farmer – Freshman (6'3, 190); 44 – Max Belyeu – Sophomore (6’2, 210); 51 Seth Werchan – (redshirt) Senior (6'3, 205); 55 – Casey Cummings – Junior (6'0, 190); Utility Players: 15 – Peyton Powell – (redshirt) Senior (6'1, 190); 29 – Cam Constantine – (redshirt) Junior (6'0, 210); Legend: (S) Suspended; (I) Ineligible; Injured; Redshirt

Roster notes

=== Starters ===
Lineup
Pos.	No.	Player.	Year
C	10	Kimble Schuessler	Junior
1B	9	Jared Thomas	Sophomore
2B	27	Jack O'Dowd	Senior
3B	15	Peyton Powell	Senior
SS	1	Jalin Flores	Sophomore
LF	4	Porter Brown	Senior
CF	8	Will Gasparino	Freshman
RF	44	Max Belyeu	Sophomore
DH	6	Rylan Galvan	Sophomore

Weekend pitching rotation
Day	No.	Player.	Year
Friday	57	Lebarron Johnson Jr.	Junior
Saturday	41	Cody Howard	Sophomore
Sunday	32	Charlie Hurley	Senior

=== Coaches ===
2024 Texas Longhorns coaching staff
- David Pierce – Head coach – 8th year
- Steve Rodriguez – Assistant coach (hitting) – 2nd year
- Philip Miller – Assistant coach – 8th year
- Caleb Longley – Assistant coach – 3rd year

=== Support staff ===
2024 Texas Longhorns support staff
- Chris Gordon – Coordinator of hitting and pitching development – 2nd year
- Carli Todd – Director of operations – 9th year
- Troy Tulowitzki – Director of player development – 1st year
- Matt Couch – Assistant head coach for athletic performance – 5th year
- Tom Mendez – Assistant athletic trainer – 5th year

== Offseason ==
=== Departures ===
All offseason departures
Name	Number	Pos.	Height	Weight	Year	Hometown	Notes
Eric Kennedy	30	OF	6’0”	205 lbs	Redshirt Senior	Tampa, FL	Graduated
Preston Hoffart	40	C	5'11”	195 lbs	Redshirt Junior	Magnolia, TX	Graduated
Sam Walbridge	47	P	6'5”	210 lbs	Redshirt Junior	San Antonio, TX	Graduated
Tanner Carlson	5	IF	6’1”	195 lbs	Senior	Elk Grove, CA	Graduated
Grant Fahrlander	50	C	5'11”	215 lbs	Freshman	Austin, TX	Departed Team
Dylan Campbell	8	OF	5'11”	205 lbs	Junior	Houston, TX	MLB Draft
Garret Guillemette	35	C	6'1”	215 lbs	Junior	Yorba Linda, CA	MLB Draft
Lucas Gordon	13	P	6'1”	193 lbs	Junior	Los Angeles, CA	MLB Draft
Travis Sthele	39	P	6'0”	215 lbs	Redshirt Sophomore	San Antonio, TX	MLB Draft
Zane Morehouse	37	P	6'4”	200 lbs	Redshirt Junior	Dawson, TX	MLB Draft

==== Outgoing transfers ====
Outgoing transfers
Name	No.	Pos.	Height	Weight	Hometown	Year	New school	Source
Cameron O'Banan	48	P	6’2”	185 lbs	Dripping Springs, TX	Redshirt Freshman	Texas State	
Chris Stuart	42	P	6’0”	230 lbs	Amsterdam	Junior	Houston	
DJ Burke	31	P	6’2”	225 lbs	San Antonio, TX	Junior	Texas State	
Kobe Minchey	34	P	6’2”	220 lbs	Jarrell, TX	Freshman	Dallas Baptist	
Mitchell Daly	19	IF	6’1”	193 lbs	Madison, AL	Junior	Kentucky	
Pierce George	58	P	6'6”	240 lbs	Austin, TX	Freshman	Alabama	

==== 2023 MLB draft ====
Round	Pick	Overall pick	Player	Position	MLB team	Source
4th	35th	136th	Dylan Campbell	OF	Los Angeles Dodgers	-
6th	15th	179th	Lucas Gordon	P	Chicago White Sox	-
12th	1st	345th	Travis Sthele	P	Washington Nationals	-
14th	24th	428th	Zane Morehouse	P	Cleveland Guardians	-
15th	30th	464th	Garret Guillemette	C	Houston Astros	-

==== Undrafted free agents ====
Player	Position	MLB team	Source
Eric Kennedy	OF	Kansas City Royals	

==== Coaching staff departures ====
Name	Position	New team	New position	Source
Woody Williams	Assistant Coach	N/A	N/A	

Coaching Staff Notes

=== Acquisitions ===
==== Incoming transfers ====
Incoming transfers
Name	B/T	Pos.	Height	Weight	Hometown	Year	Previous school	Source
Casey Cummings	R/R	OF	6'0”	185	Danville, CA	Junior	Chabot College	
Gage Boehm	R/R	P	6'5”	244	Taylor, TX	Redshirt Sophomore	Blinn College	
Grant Fontenot	R/R	P	6'3”	210	Lafayette, LA	Redshirt Sophomore	LSU	
Oliver Santos	L/L	P	6'4”	210	Newport Coast, CA	Redshirt Freshman	Duke	
Seth Werchan	L/L	OF	6'3”	210	Austin, TX	Redshirt Senior	Penn	
Will Mercer	L/L	P	6'1”	210	Houston, TX	Redshirt Senior	Notre Dame	
Will Rigney	R/R	P	6'1”	210	Woodway, TX	Redshirt Junior	Baylor	

==== Incoming recruits ====
2023 Texas recruits
Name	B/T	Pos.	Height	Weight	Hometown	High school	Source
Blake Peterson	R/R	OF	6’1”	180 lbs	Austin, TX	Westlake	
Casey Borba	R/R	IF	6’1”	205 lbs	Santa Ana, CA	Orange Lutheran	
Cole Selvig	L/R	P	6’0”	192 lbs	Altoona, WI	Regis	
Dondreone Kennedy	R/R	SS	5'11”	190 lbs	Fort Worth, TX	Prestonwood Christian Academy	
George Zaharias	R/R	P	6'3”	190 lbs	Menlo Park, CA	Menlo-Atherton	
Ean Czech	R/R	IF	6'4”	210 lbs	Downers Grove, IL	Downers Grove North	
Easton Tumis	R/R	P	6'4”	165 lbs	Friendswood, TX	Friendswood	
Hayden Morris	R/R	P	6’8”	255 lbs	Conroe, TX	Oak Ridge	
Hudson Hamilton	R/R	P	6’1”	200 lbs	Spring, TX	Grand Oaks	
Lane Allen	R/R	IF	6’3”	200 lbs	Corinth, TX	John H. Guyer	
MJ Sweeney	L/R	IF	6'8”	245 lbs	Rancho Santa Fe, CA	St. Augustine	
Matt Zatopek	R/R	P	6'3”	195 lbs	Cypress, TX	Houston Christian	
Nikolas Sanders	R/R	C	6'2”	198 lbs	Waco, TX	La Vega	
Oliver Service	R/R	C	6'0”	188 lbs	Detroit, MI	University Liggett	
Samuel Ardoin	R/R	SS	6'1”	165 lbs	Lake Charles, LA	Sam Houston	
Tommy Farmer	R/R	OF	6'3”	188 lbs	Santa Monica, CA	Oaks Christian	
Will Gasparino	R/R	OF	6’6”	215 lbs	Los Angeles, CA	Harvard-Westlake	

== Preseason ==
=== Big 12 media poll ===
Big 12 media poll
Predicted finish	Team	Votes (1st place)
1	TCU	143 (11)
2	Texas	131 (2)
3	Oklahoma State	119
4	Texas Tech	107
5	Kansas State	98
T-6	Oklahoma	85
T-6	West Virginia	85
8	Kansas	67
9	Houston	56
10	UCF	45
11	Baylor	36
T-12	BYU	21
T-12	Cincinnati	21

=== Preseason Big 12 awards and honors ===
Preseason All-Big 12 Team
Player	No.	Position	Class
Porter Brown	4	OF	Senior
Lebarron Johnson Jr.	57	P	Redshirt Junior

== Schedule and results ==
2024 Texas Longhorns baseball game log (36–24)
Legend: = Win = Loss = Canceled Bold = Texas team member
Regular season (35–20)

February (7–1)
Date	Time (CT)	TV	Opponent	Rank	Stadium	Score	Win	Loss	Save	Attendance	Overall record	Big 12 Record	Box Score	Recap
February 16	7:00 pm	LHN	San Diego	No. 16	UFCU Disch–Falk Field • Austin, TX	**W** 7–3	**Grubbs** **(1–0)**	Schrier (0–1)	-	7,935 (Note: 7,935 is the largest Opening Day attendance to date at UFCU Disch–Falk Field, 9th highest attendance all-time.)	1–0	-	Box Score	Recap
February 17	2:30 pm	LHN	San Diego	No. 16	UFCU Disch–Falk Field • Austin, TX	**L** 5–6^{(11)}	Smith (1–0)	**Selvig** **(0–1)**	Mauterer (1)	7,230	1–1	-	Box Score	Recap
February 18	1:00 pm	LHN	San Diego	No. 16	UFCU Disch–Falk Field • Austin, TX	**W** 9–4	**Howard** **(1–0)**	Gonzalez (0–1)	-	7,637	2–1	-	Box Score	Recap
February 20	6:30 pm	LHN	Houston Christian	No. 16	UFCU Disch–Falk Field • Austin, TX	**W** 20–3	**Tumis** **(1–0)**	Dagley (0–1)	-	6,863	3–1	-	Box Score	Recap
February 23	6:30 pm	LHN	Cal Poly	No. 16	UFCU Disch–Falk Field • Austin, TX	**W** 2–0	**Johnson Jr.** **(1–0)**	Wright (1–1)	**Boehm** **(1)**	7,845 (Note: 7,845 was the 13th highest attendance all time at UFCU Disch–Falk Field. Was the 12th highest attendance until it pushed down by the regular season record 8,033 the following day.)	4–1	-	Box Score	Recap
February 24	1:30 pm	LHN	Cal Poly	No. 16	UFCU Disch–Falk Field • Austin, TX	**W** 6–0	**Hurley** **(1–0)**	Brooks (0–2)	-	8,033 (Note: 8,033 is the new Regular Season attendance record and 5th largest All-Time attendance record to date at UFCU Disch–Falk Field.)	5–1	-	Box Score	Recap
February 25	1:00 pm	LHN	Cal Poly	No. 16	UFCU Disch–Falk Field • Austin, TX	**W** 7–0	**Howard** **(2–0)**	Baum (0–2)	-	7,692	6–1	-	Box Score	Recap
February 27	6:30 pm	LHN	St. John’s	No. 15	UFCU Disch–Falk Field • Austin, TX	**W** 15–4	**Harrison** **(1–0)**	Batuyios (0–1)	-	6,961	7–1	-	Box Score	Recap

March (10–10)
Date	Time (CT)	TV	Opponent	Rank	Stadium	Score	Win	Loss	Save	Attendance	Overall record	Big 12 Record	Box Score	Recap
Astros Foundation College Classic
March 1	7:00 pm	Astros.com	vs. No. 3 LSU	No. 15	Minute Maid Park • Houston, TX	**L** 3–6	Holman (3–0)	**Johnson Jr.** **(1–1)**	-	24,927	7–2	-	Box Score	Recap
March 2	3:00 pm	Astros.com	vs. Texas State	No. 15	Minute Maid Park • Houston, TX	**L** 10–11	Tippie (1–0)	**Shaw** **(0–1)**	-	21,726	7–3	-	Box Score	Recap
March 3	11:00 am	Astros.com	vs. No. 9 Vanderbilt	No. 15	Minute Maid Park • Houston, TX	**L** 11–14	Hawks (1–0)	**Fontenot** **(0–1)**	Ginther (2)	14,726	7–4	-	Box Score	Recap
March 5	6:30 pm	LHN	No. 7 Texas A&M; Lone Star Showdown	No. 24	UFCU Disch–Falk Field • Austin, TX	**L** 2–9	Aschenbeck (1–0)	**Witt** **(0–1)**	-	8,060 (Note: 8,060 is the new Regular Season attendance record and 5th largest All-Time attendance record to date at UFCU Disch–Falk Field. Surpassing the previous regular season record of 8,033 set on February 24, 2024.)	7–5	-	Box Score	Recap
March 8	6:30 pm	ESPN+	at No. 17 Texas Tech*	No. 24	Dan Law Field at Rip Griffin Park • Lubbock, TX	**W** 22–8	**Whitehead** **(1–0)**	Robinson (2–2)	-	4,432	8–5	1–0	Box Score	Recap
March 9	2:00 pm	ESPN+	at No. 17 Texas Tech*	No. 24	Dan Law Field at Rip Griffin Park • Lubbock, TX	**L** 2–7	Heuer (2–0)	**Howard** **(2–1)**	-	4,432	8–6	1–1	Box Score	Recap
March 10	2:00 pm	ESPN+	at No. 17 Texas Tech*	No. 24	Dan Law Field at Rip Griffin Park • Lubbock, TX	**W** 9–7	**Tumis** **(2–0)**	Parish (1–1)	**Boehm** **(2)**	4,432	9–6	2–1	Box Score	Recap
March 12	6:30 pm	LHN	Incarnate Word	No. 23	UFCU Disch–Falk Field • Austin, TX	**W** 7–1	**Fontenot** **(1–1)**	Dalton (2–1)	-	7,211	10–6	2–1	Box Score	Recap
March 15	6:00 pm (Note: Start time moved up 1 hour from 7:00 pm due to the threat of inclement weather.)	LHN	Washington	No.23	UFCU Disch–Falk Field • Austin, TX	**L** 3–9	Cunningham (1–2)	**Boehm** **(0–1)**	-	7,767	10–7	2–1	Box Score	Recap
March 16	2:30 pm	LHN	Washington	No. 23	UFCU Disch–Falk Field • Austin, TX	**L** 3–5	Kirchoff (1–0)	**Howard** **(2–2)**	Boyle (1)	7,646	10–8	2–1	Box Score	Recap
March 17	1:00 pm (Note: Game was delayed 90 minutes due to inclement weather, and consequentially ended after 8 innings because of travel.)	LHN	Washington	No. 23	UFCU Disch–Falk Field • Austin, TX	**W** 4–3^{(8)}	**Grubbs** **(2–0)**	Dessart (1–1)	**Duplantier II** **(1)**	7,312	11–8	2–1	Box Score	Recap
March 19	6:30 pm	LHN	Air Force		UFCU Disch–Falk Field • Austin, TX	**W** 6–5^{(10)}	**Boehm** **(1–1)**	Hentges (0–1)	-	7,125	12–8	2–1	Box Score	Recap
March 20	4:00 pm	LHN	Air Force		UFCU Disch–Falk Field • Austin, TX	**W** 12–3	**Hurley** **(2–0)**	Bello (0–1)	-	6,898	13–8	2–1	Box Score	Recap
March 22	6:30 pm	LHN	Baylor*		UFCU Disch–Falk Field • Austin, TX	**L** 3–4^{(11)}	Calder (1–1)	**Boehm** **(1–2)**	-	7,290	13–9	2–2	Box Score	Recap
March 23	2:30 pm	LHN	Baylor*		UFCU Disch–Falk Field • Austin, TX	**W** 10–2	**Whitehead** **(2–0)**	McKinney (1–3)	-	7,469	14–9	3–2	Box Score	Recap
March 24	1:00 pm	LHN	Baylor*		UFCU Disch–Falk Field • Austin, TX	**W** 11–1^{(8)}	**Grubbs** **(3–0)**	Green (1–2)	-	7,836	15–9	4–2	Box Score	Recap
March 26	6:30 pm	LHN	Texas A&M–Corpus Christi		UFCU Disch–Falk Field • Austin, TX	**L** 1–4	Feltz (2–0)	**Selvig** **(0–2)**	Thornton (4)	7,128	15–10	4–2	Box Score	Recap
March 28	6:00 pm	ESPN+	at No. 23 Kansas State*		Tointon Family Stadium • Manhattan, KS	**L** 6–14	Wintroub (2–1)	**Johnson Jr.** **(1–2)**	-	1,893	15–11	4–3	Box Score	Recap
March 29	6:00 pm	ESPN+	at No. 23 Kansas State*		Tointon Family Stadium • Manhattan, KS	**W** 21–11	**Boehm** **(2–2)**	Wentworth (1–1)	-	2,344	16–11	5–3	Box Score	Recap
March 30	2:00 pm	ESPN+	at No. 23 Kansas State*		Tointon Family Stadium • Manhattan, KS	**W** 6–3	**Grubbs** **(4–0)**	Boerema (2–2)	**Duplantier II** **(2)**	2,344	17–11	6–3	Box Score	Recap

April (11–7)
Date	Time (CT)	TV	Opponent	Rank	Stadium	Score	Win	Loss	Save	Attendance	Overall record	Big 12 Record	Box Score	Recap
April 2	6:30 pm	LHN	Abilene Christian		UFCU Disch–Falk Field • Austin, TX	**W** 11–1	**Tumis** **(3–0)**	McGarrh (2–2)	-	7,147	18–11	6–3	Box Score	Recap
April 4	6:30 pm	LHN	BYU*		UFCU Disch–Falk Field • Austin, TX	**L** 5–7	Hansen (4–3)	**Johnson Jr.** **(1–3)**	Cushing (6)	7,265	18–12	6–4	Box Score	Recap
April 5	7:30 pm	LHN	BYU*		UFCU Disch–Falk Field • Austin, TX	**W** 4–3	**Whitehead** **(3–0)**	Robison (2–3)	**Boehm** **(3)**	7,662	19–12	7–4	Box Score	Recap
April 6	2:30 pm	LHN	BYU*		UFCU Disch–Falk Field • Austin, TX	**L** 5–7	Mabeus (1–0)	**Grubbs** **(4–1)**	Cushing (7)	7,913	19–13	7–5	Box Score	Recap
April 9 (Note: Game was suspended after the 8th inning due to inclement weather, and completed the next day at 6pm before the game on April 10th.)	6:00 pm	ESPN+	at Texas State		Bobcat Ballpark • San Marcos, TX	**W** 9–1	**Lummus** **(1–0)**	Robie (3–3)	-	2,905	20–13	7–5	Box Score	Recap
April 10	7:00 pm	LHN	Texas State		UFCU Disch–Falk Field • Austin, TX	**L** 3–7	Seay (2–0)	**Tumis** **(3–1)**	-	7,928	20–14	7–5	Box Score	Recap
April 12	6:30 pm	ESPN+	at Houston*		Schroeder Park • Houston, TX	**L** 1–9	Citelli (2–0)	**Grubbs** **(4–2)**	-	1,808	20–15	7–6	Box Score	Recap
April 13	6:30 pm	ESPN+	at Houston*		Schroeder Park • Houston, TX	**W** 6–5	**Boehm** **(3–2)**	Murray (0–3)	-	2,441	21–15	8–6	Box Score	Recap
April 14	1:00 pm	ESPN+	at Houston*		Schroeder Park • Houston, TX	**W** 13–8	**Shaw** **(1–1)**	Citelli (2–1)	-	1,991	22–15	9–6	Box Score	Recap
April 16	6:30 pm	LHN	UTRGV		UFCU Disch–Falk Field • Austin, TX	**L** 9–17	Hernandez (3–3)	**Thomas** **(0–1)**	-	7,099	22–16	9–6	Box Score	Recap
April 19	6:30 pm	ESPNU	TCU*		UFCU Disch–Falk Field • Austin, TX	**L** 0–5	Tolle (4–3)	**Grubbs** **(4–3)**	-	7,449	22–17	9–7	Box Score	Recap
April 20	4:00 pm	ESPN2	TCU*		UFCU Disch–Falk Field • Austin, TX	**W** 7–0	**Whitehead** **(4–0)**	Rodriguez (3–2)	**O'Hara** **(1)**	7,440	23–17	10–7	Box Score	Recap
April 21	1:00 pm	LHN	TCU*		UFCU Disch–Falk Field • Austin, TX	**W** 2–1	**Johnson Jr.** **(2–3)**	Bixby (1–1)	**Boehm** **(4)**	7,525	24–17	11–7	Box Score	Recap
April 23	6:30 pm	LHN	UT Arlington		UFCU Disch–Falk Field • Austin, TX	**W** 11–0	**Hurley** **(3–0)**	Calhoun (0–4)	-	6,977	25–17	11–7	Box Score	Recap
April 26	6:30 pm	ESPN+	at No. 18 Oklahoma*		L. Dale Mitchell Baseball Park • Norman, OK	**L** 4–9	Davis (5–3)	**Grubbs** **(4–4)**	-	4,812	25–18	11–8	Box Score	Recap
April 28	1:00 pm	ESPN+	at No. 18 Oklahoma*		L. Dale Mitchell Baseball Park • Norman, OK	**W** 8–6	**Lummus** **(2–0)**	Witherspoon (4–3)	**Boehm** **(5)**	4,411	26–18	12–8	Box Score	Recap
April 28	5:30 pm	ESPN+	at No. 18 Oklahoma*		L. Dale Mitchell Baseball Park • Norman, OK	**W** (Note: Game was delayed in the top of the eighth inning due to lightning, and was unable to resume.); 12–10 ^{(7)}	**O'Hara** **(1–0)**	Stevens (5–1)	**Duplantier II** **(3)**	3,112	27–18	13–8	Box Score	Recap
April 30	6:30 pm	LHN	Sam Houston		UFCU Disch–Falk Field • Austin, TX	**W** 16–9	**Hurley** **(4–0)**	Coldiron (3–5)	-	7,439	28–18	13–8	Box Score	Recap

May (7–2)
Date	Time (CT)	TV	Opponent	Rank	Stadium	Score	Win	Loss	Save	Attendance	Overall record	Big 12 Record	Box Score	Recap
May 3	6:30 pm	LHN	No. 14 Oklahoma State*		UFCU Disch–Falk Field • Austin, TX	**W** 7–5	**Boehm** **(4–2)**	Molsky (6–2)	-	7,513	29–18	14–8	Box Score	Recap
May 4	2:30 pm	LHN	No. 14 Oklahoma State*		UFCU Disch–Falk Field • Austin, TX	**W** 6–3	**Duplantier II** **(1–0)**	Davis (1–3)	-	7,784	30–18	15–8	Box Score	Recap
May 5	1:00 pm	LHN	No. 14 Oklahoma State*		UFCU Disch–Falk Field • Austin, TX	**L** 2–7	Benge (2–1)	**Johnson Jr.** **(2–4)**	-	7,499	30–19	15–9	Box Score	Recap
May 10	5:00 pm	ESPN+	at UCF*		John Euliano Park • Orlando, FL	**W** 6–3	**Grubbs** **(5–4)**	Vespi (3–3)	**Boehm** **(6)**	1,989	31–19	16–9	Box Score	Recap
May 11	5:00 pm	ESPN+	at UCF*		John Euliano Park • Orlando, FL	**L** 4–5	Stagliano (3–3)	**Whitehead** **(4–1)**	Castellano (3)	2,141	31–20	16–10	Box Score	Recap
May 12	12:00 pm	ESPN+	at UCF*		John Euliano Park • Orlando, FL	**W** 10–7	**Hurley** **(5–0)**	Victor (0–2)	**Boehm** **(7)**	1,605	32–20	17–10	Box Score	Recap
May 16	6:30 pm	LHN	Kansas*	No. 25	UFCU Disch–Falk Field • Austin, TX	**W** 5–4	**Boehm** **(5–2)**	Cranton (3–3)	-	7,081	33–20	18–10	Box Score	Recap
May 17	6:30 pm	LHN	Kansas*	No. 25	UFCU Disch–Falk Field • Austin, TX	**W** 3–2	**Duplantier II** **(2–0)**	Moore (1–3)	-	7,657	34–20	19–10	Box Score	Recap
May 18	2:30 pm	LHN	Kansas*	No. 25	UFCU Disch–Falk Field • Austin, TX	**W** 9–7	**Johnson Jr.** **(3–4)**	Shaw (3–1)	**Boehm** **(8)**	7,827	35–20	20–10	Box Score	Recap

Postseason (1–4)

Big 12 Tournament (0–2)
Date	Time (CT)	TV	Opponent	Seed	Stadium	Score	Win	Loss	Save	Attendance	Overall record	Tournament record	Box Score	Recap
May 21	9:20 pm (Note: Game was pushed back from its original 7:30 pm start time due to previous tournament game going to extras.)	ESPN+	vs. (10) Texas Tech	No. 24 (3)	Globe Life Field • Arlington, TX	**L** 4–6	Sanders (5–1)	**Duplantier II** **(2–1)**	-	8,349	35–21	0–1	Box Score	Recap
May 22	4:00 pm	ESPN+	vs. (5) Cincinnati	No. 24 (3)	Globe Life Field • Arlington, TX	**L** 7–8	Marsh (5–2)	**Boehm** **(5–3)**	-	7,110	35–22	0–2	Box Score	Recap

NCAA College Station Regional (1–2)
Date	Time (CT)	TV	Opponent	Seed	Stadium	Score	Win	Loss	Save	Attendance	Overall record	Regional record	Box Score	Recap
May 31	5:00 pm	ESPNU	vs. No. 22 (2) Louisiana	(3)	Olsen Field at Blue Bell Park • College Station, TX	**W** 12–5	**Grubbs** **(6–4)**	Fluno (4–1)	-	7,020	36–22	1–0	Box Score	Recap
June 1	8:00 pm	ESPN	vs. No. 4 (1) Texas A&M (Note: Texas was the Designated Home Team.); Lone Star Showdown	(3)	Olsen Field at Blue Bell Park • College Station, TX	**L** 2–4^{(11)}	Aschenbeck (6–1)	**Duplantier II** **(2–2)**	-	7,630	36–23	1–1	Box Score	Recap
June 2	2:00 pm	ESPN2	vs. No. 22 (2) Louisiana	(3)	Olsen Field at Blue Bell Park • College Station, TX	**L** 2–10	Morgan (5–3)	**Whitehead** **(4–2)**	-	6,989	36–24	1–2	Box Score	Recap

Schedule Notes

== Awards, accomplishments, and honors ==
=== Conference honors ===
Conference honors
Honors	Player	Position	Ref.
Big 12 Player of the Year	Max Belyeu	OF	
All-Big 12 First Team	Jalin Flores	IF	
All-Big 12 First Team	Jared Thomas	IF	
All-Big 12 First Team	Max Belyeu	OF	
All-Big 12 First Team	Gage Boehm	RP	
All-Big 12 Second Team	Peyton Powell	IF	
All-Big 12 Freshman Team	Will Gasparino	OF	

=== Weekly honors ===
Weekly honors
Honors	Player	Position	Date Awarded	Ref.
Big 12 Player of the Week	Peyton Powell	UTL	February 26, 2024	
Big 12 Pitcher of the Week	Lebarron Johnson Jr.	P	February 26, 2024	
Big 12 Player of the Week	Max Belyeu	OF	March 11, 2024	
Big 12 Player of the Week	Max Belyeu	OF	March 25, 2024	

== Rankings ==
Ranking movements Legend: ██ Increase in ranking ██ Decrease in ranking — = Not ranked RV = Received votes
	Week																		
Poll	Pre	1	2	3	4	5	6	7	8	9	10	11	12	13	14	15	16	17	Final
Coaches'	13	13*	13	22	24	RV	RV	RV	—	—	—	—	RV	RV	24	RV	RV*	RV*	RV
Baseball America	13	14	14	23	23	RV	RV	RV	—	—	—	—	25	24	24	RV	RV*	RV*	RV
NCBWA†	9	15	14	24	24	RV	RV	RV	RV	RV	RV	RV	RV	RV	25	RV	RV*	RV*	RV
D1Baseball	16	16	15	24	23	RV	RV	RV	—	—	—	—	RV	25	24	RV	RV*	RV*	RV
Perfect Game	8	9	8	14	14	—	—	—	—	—	—	—	18	18	19	RV	RV*	RV*	RV

† NCBWA ranks 30 teams in their preseason poll, but only ranks 25 teams weekly during the season.
* A new poll was not released for this week, so for comparison purposes, the previous week's ranking is inserted in this week's slot.
