= 2024 Houston Christian Huskies baseball team =

American college baseball season

2024 Houston Christian Huskies baseball
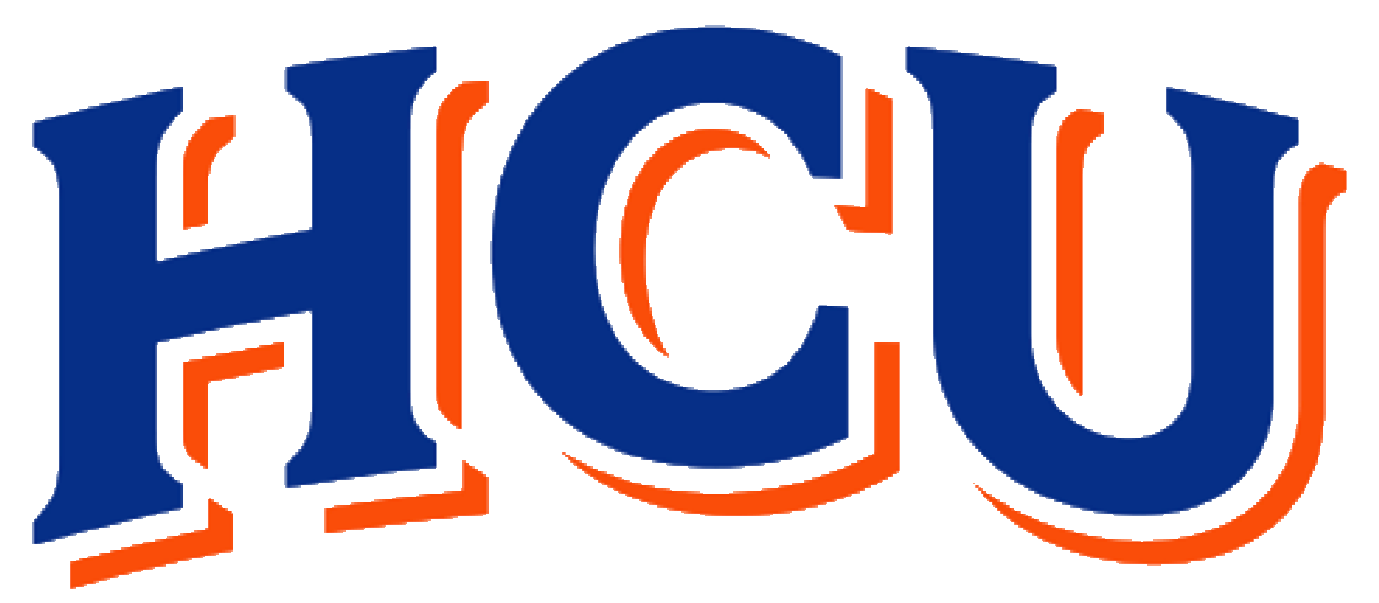
- Conference: Southland Conference
- Record: 18–31 (9–15 Southland)
- Head coach: Lance Berkman (3rd season)
- Assistant coaches: Clay Vanderlaan; Tyler Bremer; Sam McElrath
- Home stadium: Husky Field

2024 Southland Conference baseball standings
| | Conf. | | | | Overall |
| Team | W | | L | PCT | W | | L | PCT |
|---|---|---|---|---|---|---|---|---|
| Lamar ‍†‍‍ | 17 | – | 7 | .708 | 44 | – | 15 | .746 |
| Nicholls ‍‍‡‍^{y} | 16 | – | 8 | .667 | 38 | – | 22 | .633 |
| New Orleans ‍‍‍ | 14 | – | 10 | .583 | 31 | – | 26 | .544 |
| McNeese ‍‍‍ | 11 | – | 13 | .458 | 32 | – | 27 | .542 |
| Northwestern State ‍‍‍ | 11 | – | 13 | .458 | 22 | – | 33 | .400 |
| Southeastern Louisiana ‍‍‍ | 10 | – | 14 | .417 | 30 | – | 28 | .517 |
| Texas A&M–Corpus Christi ‍‍‍ | 10 | – | 14 | .417 | 22 | – | 35 | .386 |
| Incarnate Word ‍‍‍ | 10 | – | 14 | .417 | 26 | – | 31 | .456 |
| Houston Christian ‍‍‍ | 9 | – | 15 | .375 | 18 | – | 31 | .367 |
† – Conference champion ‡ – Tournament champion y – Invited to the NCAA Tournament; As of June 1, 2024; Rankings from D1Baseball

The 2024 Houston Christian Huskies baseball team represented Houston Christian University, during the 2024 NCAA Division I baseball season. The Huskies played their home games at Husky Field and were led by third–year head coach Lance Berkman, former star player with the Houston Astros. They are members of the Southland Conference. The Huskies had a regular season record of 18–31 and a conference record of 9–15 finishing in ninth place in SLC play. They did not qualify for the 2024 Southland Conference baseball tournament. Head coach, Lance Berkman, resigned at the conclusion of the 2024 season.

== Previous season ==
The Huskies had a regular season record of 11–37 and a conference record of 7–16 finishing in ninth place in SLC play. They did not qualify for the 2023 Southland Conference baseball tournament.

== Preseason ==
=== Southland Conference Coaches Poll ===
The Southland Conference Coaches Poll was released on February 8, 2024. Houston Christian was picked to finish ninth in the Southland Conference with 26 votes.

Coaches poll
| Predicted finish | Team | Votes (1st place) |
| 1 | Nicholls | 126 (14) |
| 2 | Lamar | 106 (1) |
| 3 | New Orleans | 92 (3) |
| 4 | Incarnate Word | 81 |
| 5 | McNeese | 67 |
| 6 | Texas A&M–Corpus Christi | 55 |
| 7 | Southeastern Louisiana | 53 |
| 8 | Northwestern State | 42 |
| 9 | Houston Christian | 26 |

=== Preseason All-Southland team ===
Samuel Benjamin was named to the conference preseason first team.

==== First Team ====
- Edgar Alvarez* (NICH, SR, 1st Base)
- MaCrae Kendrick (NICH, SR, 2nd Base)
- Ethan Ruiz (LU, SR, 3rd Base)
- Parker Coddou* (NICH, SR, Shortstop)
- Miguel Useche (UNO, SR, Catcher)
- Rey Mendoza* (UIW, GR, Designated Hitter)
- Mitchell Sanford* (UNO, RJR, Outfielder)
- Samuel Benjamin* (HCU, SR, Outfielder)
- Issac Williams (UNO, SR, Outfielder)
- Jacob Mayers* (NICH, SO, Starting Pitcher)
- Brooks Caple* (LU, SR, Starting Pitcher)
- Hunter Hesseltine* (LU, JR, Starting Pitcher)
- Gavin Galy* (NICH, RJR, Relief Pitcher)
- Kanin Dodge (LU, SR, Utility)

*-2023 Southland All-Conference Selection

==== Second Team ====
- Cameron Crotte (UIW, SR, 1st Base)
- Austin Roccaforte (LU, SR, 2nd Base)
- Dylan Mach (UNO, SR, 3rd Base)
- Jake Haze* (SLU, GR, Shortstop)
- Bo Willis (NWST, SR, Catcher)
- River Orsak (LU, SR, Designated Hitter)
- Garrett Felix (NICH, SR, Outfielder)
- Cooper Hext (MCNS, SR, Outfielder)
- Christian Smith-Johnson (TAMUCC, SO, Outfielder)
- Chase Prestwich (NWST, JR, Starting Pitcher)
- Isaiah Zavala (UIW, GR, Starting Pitcher)
- Jacob Ellis (LU, SR, Starting Pitcher)
- Jackson Cleveland (LU, JR, Relief Pitcher)
- Grant Randall (UIW, SR, Utility)

*-2023 Southland All-Conference Selection

== Roster ==
2024 Houston Christian Huskies baseball team
Players
Coaches

| # | Pos. | Name | B/T | Height | Weight | Year | Home town |
|---|---|---|---|---|---|---|---|
| 1 | RHP | Trent Baker | R/R | 6 ft 0 in (1.83 m) | 190 lb (86 kg) | So | Spring, TX |
| 2 | OF | Baylor Baunmann | R/R | 5 ft 10 in (1.78 m) | 160 lb (73 kg) | So | Heath, Texas |
| 3 | OF | Damian Ruiz | R/R | 6 ft 1 in (1.85 m) | 170 lb (77 kg) | So | Livingston, TX |
| 4 | INF | Cash Benavidez | R/R | 5 ft 11 in (1.8 m) | 175 lb (79 kg) | So | Alice, TX |
| 5 | RHP | Cash McNicholas | R/R | 5 ft 1 in (1.55 m) | 195 lb (88 kg) | Sr | Spring, TX |
| 6 | INF | Ty Hodge | R/R | 6 ft 2 in (1.88 m) | 200 lb (91 kg) | So | College Station, TX |
| 7 | RHP | Justin Barry-Smith | R/R | 5 ft 11 in (1.8 m) | 210 lb (95 kg) | So | The Woodlands, TX |
| 8 | OF | Samuel Benjamin | L/L | 6 ft 0 in (1.83 m) | 195 lb (88 kg) | Sr | Katy, TX |
| 9 | INF | Trevor Roper | R/R | 6 ft 0 in (1.83 m) | 180 lb (82 kg) | Jr | Midland, TX |
| 10 | LHP | Keevyn Goss | L/L | 6 ft 2 in (1.88 m) | 200 lb (91 kg) | Fr | Corpus Christi, TX |
| 12 | INF | Katcher Halligan | L/R | 6 ft 0 in (1.83 m) | 190 lb (86 kg) | Jr | Sugar Land, TX |
| 13 | RHP | Jonathan Valdez | R/R | 5 ft 11 in (1.8 m) | 190 lb (86 kg) | So | College Station, TX |
| 14 | RHP | Jackson Hamilton | R/R | 6 ft 0 in (1.83 m) | 190 lb (86 kg) | So | College Station, TX |
| 15 | RHP | Bennett Hanks | R/R | 6 ft 2 in (1.88 m) | 206 lb (93 kg) | Jr | Houston, TX |
| 16 | RHP | Dave Wilson | R/R | 6 ft 0 in (1.83 m) | 215 lb (98 kg) | Sr | Austin, TX |
| 17 | RHP | Brock Shoffner | R/R | 6 ft 4 in (1.93 m) | 195 lb (88 kg) | Sr | Houston, TX |
| 18 | RHP | James Kirkpatrick | R/R | 6 ft 1 in (1.85 m) | 200 lb (91 kg) | Sr | Houston, TX |
| 19 | RHP | Jett Feltman | R/R | 6 ft 3 in (1.91 m) | 215 lb (98 kg) | Jr | Conroe, TX |
| 21 | RHP | Daxton Tinker | R/R | 6 ft 3 in (1.91 m) | 225 lb (102 kg) | Sr | Sulphur, Louisiana |
| 22 | RHP | Jarek Wells | R/R | 6 ft 1 in (1.85 m) | 205 lb (93 kg) | Sr | Spring Branch, TX |
| 23 | C | Dylan LaRue | R/R | 6 ft 0 in (1.83 m) | 175 lb (79 kg) | So | Blanco, TX |
| 24 | C | Tyler LaRue | R/R | 6 ft 2 in (1.88 m) | 225 lb (102 kg) | Sr | Blanco, TX |
| 25 | OF | William Jewell | L/L | 6 ft 0 in (1.83 m) | 205 lb (93 kg) | Sr | Salinas, CA |
| 26 | RHP | Mark Lopez | R/R | 5 ft 10 in (1.78 m) | 160 lb (73 kg) | Jr | Conroe, TX |
| 28 | C | Luke Bard | R/R | 6 ft 3 in (1.91 m) | 190 lb (86 kg) | So | Castle Rock, CO |
| 29 | OF | Josh Prinner | L/R | 6 ft 0 in (1.83 m) | 170 lb (77 kg) | Jr | Mountain Home, AR |
| 31 | INF | Graham Laxton | R/R | 5 ft 11 in (1.8 m) | 160 lb (73 kg) | Fr | Katy, TX |
| 32 | RHP | Nicholas Willard | R/R | 6 ft 3 in (1.91 m) | 168 lb (76 kg) | Sr | Yorktown, VA |
| 33 | OF | Ty Dagley | L/L | 5 ft 11 in (1.8 m) | 175 lb (79 kg) | Fr | Katy, TX |
| 35 | RHP | Rye Gunter | R/R | 6 ft 5 in (1.96 m) | 225 lb (102 kg) | Sr | Coppell, TX |
| 36 | RHP | Reagan Gayle | R/R | 6 ft 1 in (1.85 m) | 195 lb (88 kg) | Fr | Cypress, TX |
| 38 | RHP | Brayden Gilley | R/R | 6 ft 4 in (1.93 m) | 205 lb (93 kg) | Fr | Deer Park, TX |
| 39 | OF | Lane Sparks | L/L | 6 ft 0 in (1.83 m) | 175 lb (79 kg) | Fr | Brenham, TX |
| 43 | C | Parker Edwards | R/R | 6 ft 5 in (1.96 m) | 215 lb (98 kg) | Sr | Houston, TX |
| 44 | INF | Jaquae Steward | L/L | 5 ft 10 in (1.78 m) | 230 lb (104 kg) | Fr | Sinton, TX |
| 45 | RHP | Cayden Maxwell | R/R | 6 ft 0 in (1.83 m) | 190 lb (86 kg) | Fr | Caldwell, TX |
| 50 | RHP | Nolan Wilson | R/R | 6 ft 0 in (1.83 m) | 205 lb (93 kg) | So | Hockley, TX |
| 51 | RHP | Ethan Coronel | R/R | 6 ft 0 in (1.83 m) | 180 lb (82 kg) | Fr | The Woodlands, TX |
| 55 | RHP | Christian Diaz | R/R | 6 ft 1 in (1.85 m) | 190 lb (86 kg) | Sr | Houston, TX |

Head coach

Lance Berkman – 3rd season

Assistant coach(es)

Clay VanderLaan, Tyler Bremerr, and Sam McElreath - Volunteer Asst Coach

Legend

- (C) Team captain
- (S) Suspended
- (I) Ineligible
- Injured
- Current redshirt

Roster
Last update: 2024-04-14

== Schedule and results ==
Legend
| | Houston Christian win |
| | Houston Christian loss |
| | Postponement/Cancelation/Suspensions |
| **Bold** | Houston Christian team member |
| * | Non-Conference game |
| † | Make-Up Game |

2024 Houston Christian Huskies baseball game log
Regular season (18–31)

February (4–6)
| Date | Opponent | Rank | Site/stadium | Score | Win | Loss | Save | TV | Attendance | Overall record | SLC record |
|---|---|---|---|---|---|---|---|---|---|---|---|
| Feb. 16 | Le Moyne* | | Husky Field • Houston, TX | 4–3 | **Lopez, Mark (1-0)** | HOFFACKER, Billy (0-1) | None | | 150 | 1–0 | |
| Feb. 17 | Le Moyne* | | Husky Field • Houston, TX | 4–11 (10 inn) | Smith, Kennen | **Edwards, Parker (0-1)** | None | | 178 | 1–1 | |
| Feb. 18 | Le Moyne* | | Husky Field • Houston, TX | 1–0 | **Willard, Nicholas (1-0)** | HOFFACKER, Billy (0-2) | None | | 134 | 2–1 | |
| Feb. 18 | Le Moyne* | | Husky Field • Houston, TX | 7–6 | **McNicholas, Cash (1-0)** | DANAHER, Max (0-1) | None | | 174 | 3–1 | |
| Feb. 20 | at Texas* | 14 | UFCU Disch–Falk Field • Austin, TX | 3–20 | Tumis, Easton (1-0) | **Dagley, Ty (0-1)** | None | LHN | 6,863 | 3–2 | |
Sugar Land Classic
| Feb. 24 | vs. Creighton* | | Constellation Field • Sugar Land, TX | 1–22 (7 inn) | Dominic Cancellieri (2-0) | **Kirkpatrick, James (0-1)** | None | | 292 | 3–3 | |
| Feb. 24 | vs. UIC* | | Constellation Field • Sugar Land, TX | 7–10 | BAK, Brandon (1-0) | **Willard, Nicholas (1-1)** | LAWLER, Reece (1) | | 542 | 2–4 | |
| Feb. 25 | vs. Stephen F. Austin* | | Constellation Field • Sugar Land, TX | 19–9 (7 inn) | **Feltman, Jett (1-0)** | Kade Parker (0-2) | None | | 283 | 4–4 | |
| Feb. 27 | at Sam Houston* | | Don Sanders Stadium • Huntsville, TX | 3–14 | Gavi Coldiron (1-0) | **Coronel, Ethan (0-1)** | None | | 848 | 4–5 | |
| Feb. 29 | Eastern Michigan* | | Husky Field • Houston, TX | 4–14 | JONES, Bobby (1-1) | **Kirkpatrick, James (0-2)** | None | | 113 | 4–6 | |

March (5–12)
| Date | Opponent | Rank | Site/stadium | Score | Win | Loss | Save | TV | Attendance | Overall record | SLC record |
|---|---|---|---|---|---|---|---|---|---|---|---|
| Mar 1 | Eastern Michigan* | | Husky Field • Houston, TX | 6–5 | **Willard, Nicholas (2-1)** | PIRKLE, Aaron (0-1) | N0ne | | 87 | 5–6 | |
| Mar 1 | Eastern Michigan* | | Husky Field • Houston, TX | 4–0 | **Goss, Keevyn (1-0)** | KUNST, Jimmy (0-1) | None | | 128 | 6–6 | |
| Mar 2 | Eastern Michigan* | | Husky Field • Houston, TX | 8–4 | **Feltman, Jett (2-0)** | CHITTUM, Nick (1-2) | **Diaz, Christian (1)** | | 117 | 7–6 | |
| Mar 7 | at Southern Illinois* | | Itchy Jones Stadium • Carbondale, IL | 11–13 | Kade Coombe (1-0) | **Valdez, Jonathan (0-1)** | Easton Dermody (2) | | 156 | 7–7 | |
| Mar 8 | at Southern Illinois* | | Itchy Jones Stadium • Carbondale, IL | 2–4 | Mike Hansell (2-1) | **Edwards, Parker (1-2)** | Anthony Pron (2) | | 132 | 7–8 | |
| Mar 9 | at Southern Illinois* | | Itchy Jones Stadium • Carbondale, IL | 1–13 (7 inn) | Al Holguin (1-1) | **Feltman, Jett (2-1)** | None | | 432 | 7–9 | |
| Mar 13 | at Texas State* | | Bobcat Ballpark • San Marcos, TX | 6–12 | Zabel, Peyton (2-1) | **Goss, Keevyn (0-1)** | None | | 1,544 | 7–10 | |
| Mar 15 | at Rice* | | Reckling Park • Houston, TX | 7–10 | Tom Vincent (1-0) | **Baumann, Baylor (0-1)** | Davion Hickson (2) | ESPN+ | 1,978 | 7–11 | |
| Mar 16 | Rice* | | Husky Field • Houston, TX | 3–7 | J.D. McCracken (2-1) | **Edwards, Parker (1-3)** | Tyler Hamilton (1) | | | 7–12 | |
| Mar 17 | at Rice* | | Reckling Park • Houston, TX | 6–10 | Mauricio Rodriguez (1-0) | **Feltman, Jett (2-2)** | Davion Hickson (3) | ESPN+ | 2,029 | 7–13 | |
| Mar 23 | Lamar | | Husky Field • Houston, TX | 1–8 | Caple, Brooks (3-2) | **Willard, Nicholas (2-2)** | None | ESPN+ | 312 | 7–14 | 0–1 |
| Mar 23 | Lamar | | Husky Field • Houston, TX | 4–6 | Ellis, Jacob (4-0) | **Edwards, Parker (1-4)** | Perez, Andres (4) | | 293 | 7–15 | 0–2 |
| Mar 24 | Lamar | | Husky Field • Houston, TX | 9–11 | Moseley, Kyle (2-0) | **Hamilton, Jackson (0-1)** | Neal, Austin (3) | ESPN+ | 293 | 7–16 | 0–3 |
| Mar 26 | at Texas A&M* | | Olsen Field at Blue Bell Park • College Station, TX | 3–6 | Chris Cortez (2–1) | **Ethan Coronel (0–1)** | None | | 4,784 | 7–17 | |
| Mar 28 | at Southeastern Louisiana | | Pat Kenelly Diamond at Alumni Field • Hammond, LA | 1–11 (7 inn) | Stuprich, Brennan (3-2) | **Willard, Nicholas (2-3)** | None | ESPN+ | 1,343 | 7–18 | 0–4 |
| Mar 28 | at Southeastern Louisiana | | Pat Kenelly Diamond at Alumni Field • Hammond, LA | 9–2 | **Edwards, Parker (2-3)** | Lee, Dakota (0-2) | None | ESPN+ | 1,332 | 8–18 | 1–4 |
| Mar 29 | at Southeastern Louisiana | | Pat Kenelly Diamond at Alumni Field • Hammond, LA | 7–0 | **Gunter, Rye (1-0)** | Kinzeler, Will (1-2) | **Feltman, Jett (1)** | ESPN+ | 1,290 | 9–18 | 2–4 |

April (6–10)
| Date | Opponent | Rank | Site/stadium | Score | Win | Loss | Save | TV | Attendance | Overall record | SLC record |
|---|---|---|---|---|---|---|---|---|---|---|---|
| Apr 2 | at Baylor* | | Baylor Ballpark • Waco, TX | 5–13 | Calder, Ethan (3-1) | **Valdez, Jonathan (0-2)** | None | ESPN+ | 1,565 | 9–19 | |
| Apr 5 | New Orleans | | Husky Field • Houston, TX | 4–15 (7 inn) | Mercer, Colton (4-3) | **Baumann, Baylor (0-2)** | None | ESPN+ | 193 | 9–20 | 2–5 |
| Apr 6 | New Orleans | | Husky Field • Houston, TX | 7–1 | **Edwards, Parker (3-4)** | Edwards, Grant (2-3) | **Willard, Nicholas (1)** | | 213 | 10–20 | 3–5 |
| Apr 7 | New Orleans | | Husky Field • Houston, TX | 11–4 | **Gunter, Rye (2-0)** | Dennis, Cortez (0-2) | None | ESPN+ | 189 | 11–20 | 4–5 |
| Apr 12 | at Texas A&M–Corpus Christi | | Chapman Field • Corpus Christi, TX | 6–2 | **Hamilton, Jackson (1-1)** | Hill, Jack (1-3) | None | ESPN+ | 350 | 12–20 | 5–5 |
| Apr 13 | at Texas A&M–Corpus Christi | | Chapman Field • Corpus Christi, TX | 17–1 | **Edwards, Parker (4-4)** | Hunsaker, Riley (4-3) | None | ESPN+ | 150 | 13–20 | 6–5 |
| Apr 14 | at Texas A&M–Corpus Christi | | Chapman Field • Corpus Christi, TX | 12–13 | Maddox Thornton (1–3) | **Jett Feltman (2–3)** | Jack Hill (2) | ESPN+ | 252 | 13–21 | 6–6 |
| Apr 16 | at Houston | | Schroeder Park • Houston, TX | 0–10 (8 inn) | Wright, Dan. (2-0) | **Valdez, Jonathan (0-3)** | None | ESPN+ | 1,047 | 13–22 | |
| Apr 19 | Nicholls | | Husky Field • Houston, TX | 2–14 (7 inn) | Mayers, Jacob (3-0) | **Coronel, Ethan (0-3)** | None | ESPN+ | 337 | 13–23 | 6–7 |
| Apr 20 | Nicholls | | Husky Field • Houston, TX | 6–9 | Desandro, Devin (4-3) | **Willard, Nicholas (2-4)** | Saltaformaggio, Nico (1) | | 273 | 13–24 | 6–8 |
| Apr 21 | Nicholls | | Husky Field • Houston, TX | 5–6 (12 inn) | Farley, Dylan (2-2) | **Shoffner, Brock (0-1)** | None | | 115 | 13–25 | 6–9 |
| Apr 23 | Stephen F. Austin* | | Husky Field • Houston, TX | 8–3 | **Valdez, Jonathan (1-3)** | Will Larson (0-2) | None | 179 | | 14–25 | |
| Apr 24 | at Louisiana* | 17 | M. L. Tigue Moore Field at Russo Park • Lafayette, LA | 10–9 | **Ryan, Zach (1-0)** | Blake McGehee (2-2) | **Wells, Jarek (1)** | ESPN+ | 2,817 | 15–25 | |
| Apr 26 | at Northwestern State | | H. Alvin Brown–C. C. Stroud Field • Natchitoches, LA | 5–11 | Prestwich, Chase (4-4) | **Edwards, Parker (4-5)** | Marquez, Alejandro (1) | ESPN+ | 672 | 15–26 | 6–10 |
| Apr 27 | at Northwestern State | | H. Alvin Brown–C. C. Stroud Field • Natchitoches, LA | 2–5 | Bryan, Tyler (1-1) | **Gunter, Rye (2-1)** | None | ESPN+ | 737 | 15–27 | 6–11 |
| Apr 28 | at Northwestern State | | H. Alvin Brown–C. C. Stroud Field • Natchitoches, LA | 4–14 (7 inn) | Flowers, Dawson (2-3) | **Hamilton, Jackson (1-2)** | None | ESPN+ | 762 | 15–28 | 6–12 |

May (3–3)
| Date | Opponent | Rank | Site/stadium | Score | Win | Loss | Save | TV | Attendance | Overall record | SLC record |
|---|---|---|---|---|---|---|---|---|---|---|---|
| May 3 | at Nevada* | | William Peccole Park • Reno, NV | | | **Cancelled** | | | | | |
| May 4 | at Nevada* | | William Peccole Park • Reno, NV | | | **Cancelled** | | | | | |
| May 5 | at Nevada* | | William Peccole Park • Reno, NV | | | **Cancelled** | | | | | |
| May 10 | McNeese | | Husky Field • Houston, TX | 2–6 | Voss, Zach (1-4) | Edwards, Parker (4-6) | None | ESPN+ | 933 | 15–29 | 6–13 |
| May 11 | McNeese | | Husky Field • Houston, TX | 6–13 | Brock Barthelemy (3-0) | **Gunter, Rye (2-2)** | None | | 1,024 | 15–30 | 6–14 |
| May 11 | McNeese | | Husky Field • Houston, TX | 9–7 | **Lopez, Mark (1-0)** | Ty Abraham (3-3) | **Wells, Jarek (2)** | | 1,024 | 16–30 | 7–14 |
| May 16 | Incarnate Word | | Husky Field • Houston, TX | 4–2 | **Edwards, Parker (5-5)** | **Salinas, Josh (5-3)** | Diaz, Christian (2) | | 112 | 17–30 | 8–14 |
| May 18 | Incarnate Word | | Vincent–Beck Stadium • Beaumont, TX | 5–3 | **Lopez, Mark (3-0)** | Zavala, Isaiah (4-5) | None | ESPN+ | | 18–30 | 9–14 |
| May 18 | Incarnate Word | | Vincent–Beck Stadium • Beaumont, TX | 4–14 | Berens, Micah (2-3) | **Hamilton, Jackson (1-3)** | None | ESPN+ | 124 | 18–31 | 9–15 |

Legend: = Win = Loss = Canceled
Bold = Houston Christian team member
Rankings are based on the team's current ranking in the D1Baseball poll.

Schedule source:

*Rankings are based on the team's current ranking in the D1Baseball poll. |}

== See also ==
2024 Houston Christian Huskies softball team
