= 2024 Lamar Cardinals baseball team =

American college baseball season

2024 Lamar Cardinals baseball

Southland Conference regular season champions
- Conference: Southland Conference
- Record: 44–15 (17–7 SLC)
- Head coach: Will Davis (8th season)
- Assistant coaches: Scott Hatten; Sean Snedeker; Tod McDowell
- Home stadium: Vincent–Beck Stadium

2024 Southland Conference baseball standings
	Conf.				Overall
Team	W		L	PCT	W		L	PCT
Lamar ‍†‍‍	17	–	7	.708	44	–	15	.746
Nicholls ‍‍‡‍^{y}	16	–	8	.667	38	–	22	.633
New Orleans ‍‍‍	14	–	10	.583	31	–	26	.544
McNeese ‍‍‍	11	–	13	.458	32	–	27	.542
Northwestern State ‍‍‍	11	–	13	.458	22	–	33	.400
Southeastern Louisiana ‍‍‍	10	–	14	.417	30	–	28	.517
Texas A&M–Corpus Christi ‍‍‍	10	–	14	.417	22	–	35	.386
Incarnate Word ‍‍‍	10	–	14	.417	26	–	31	.456
Houston Christian ‍‍‍	9	–	15	.375	18	–	31	.367
† – Conference champion ‡ – Tournament champion y – Invited to the NCAA Tournament; As of June 1, 2024; Rankings from D1Baseball

The 2024 Lamar Cardinals baseball team represented Lamar University during the 2024 NCAA Division I baseball season as members of the Southland Conference. The Cardinals played their home games at Vincent–Beck Stadium and were led by eighth–year head coach Will Davis. On May 16, the team clinched at least a share of the conference regular season championship. The Cardinals moved to sole regular season champions due to a 6–10 Nicholls loss to McNeese in both teams' final regular season game on May 18. The team compiled a 44–15 overall record and were 17–7 in conference play winning the regular season championship. They qualified for the SLC tournament as the number 1 seed. The Cardinals advanced to the tournament semi–finals with a 3–2 tournament record losing their first game 3–6 to 8th seeded Incarnate Word and winning three elimination games defeating 4th seeded Northwestern State 12–5, Incarnate Word 18–6 ^{7}, and McNeese 18–9. Their season ended with a loss to McNeese 4–14 ^{7}.

== Previous season ==
The Cardinals had an overall season record of 32–23 including a conference record of 13–11 finishing in third place in SLC play. They participated in the 2023 Southland Conference baseball tournament as the third seeded team. The Cardinals were 0–2 in the conference tournament losing to fourth seeded New Orleans 1–4 and first seeded Nicholls 0–4.

=== New Players ===
On September 26, 2023, Lamar announced the addition of eight junior college transfers joining the team for the 2024 season. On October 21, 2023, Lamar announced ten transfers from NCAA Division I programs and one player from an NCAA Division II program.

Player	Position	Hometown	Previous Team
NCAA Division I Transfers
Cristian Cienfuegos	Pitcher (RHP)	Baytown, Texas	Rice
Bryce Grizzaffi	Catcher	Morgan City, Louisiana	Southeastern Louisiana
Logan Hamm	Outfielder /Pitcher (RHP)	Bridge City, Texas	Houston
Peyton Harvard	Pitcher (RHP)	Bridge City, Texas	Louisiana
Scott Jones	Outfielder	Sulphur, Louisiana	Butler
Weston Peninger	Catcher	Flower Mound, Texas	Utah Valley
Travis Phelps	Pitcher (RHP)	Alvin, Texas	Houston
Will Ripoll	Pitcher (RHP)–	New Orleans, Louisiana	Houston Christian
Austin Roccaforte	Outfielder / Infielder	Port Neches, Texas	Houston Christian
Drake Varnado	Infielder	Tomball, Texas	Arizona State
NCAA Division II Transfer
Kyle Mosley	Pitcher (LHP)	Houston, Texas	Angelo State
JUCO Transfers
Brayden Evans	1B / Outfielder	Pearland, Texas	Wharton JC
Slade Foreman	Outfielder	Bridge City, Texas	Angelina College
Colton Graham	Pitcher (RHP)	Surprise, Arizona	Glendale CC
Heladio Moreno	Outfielder	Pearland, Texas	Angelina College
Anthony Ortiz	Pitcher (RHP)	Caguas, Puerto Rico	Labette CC
Hunter Rebando	Catcher	Lampasas, Texas	Hill College
Ricky Sanchez	Infielder	Mexico City, Mexico	Barton CC
Zak Skinner	Catcher	Melbourne, Australia	Vernon College

College Top 25: April 15

=== Southland Conference Coaches Poll ===
The Southland Conference Coaches Poll was released on February 8, 2024. Lamar was picked to finish second in the Southland Conference with 106 overall votes and 1 first place vote.

Coaches poll
Predicted finish	Team	Votes (1st place)
1	Nicholls	126 (14)
2	Lamar	106 (1)
3	New Orleans	92 (3)
4	Incarnate Word	81
5	McNeese	67
6	Texas A&M–Corpus Christi	55
7	Southeastern Louisiana	53
8	Northwestern State	42
9	Houston Christian	26

=== Preseason All-Southland team ===
Ethan Ruiz, Brooks Caple, Hunter Hesseltine, and Kanin Dodge were named to the conference preseason first team. Austin Roccaforte, River Orsak, Jacob Ellis, and Jackson Cleveland were named to the conference preseason second team.

==== First Team ====
- Edgar Alvarez* (NICH, SR, 1st Base)
- MaCrae Kendrick (NICH, SR, 2nd Base)
- Ethan Ruiz (LU, SR, 3rd Base)
- Parker Coddou* (NICH, SR, Shortstop)
- Miguel Useche (UNO, SR, Catcher)
- Rey Mendoza* (UIW, GR, Designated Hitter)9
- Mitchell Sanford* (UNO, RJR, Outfielder)
- Samuel Benjamin* (HCU, SR, Outfielder)
- Issac Williams (UNO, SR, Outfielder)
- Jacob Mayers* (NICH, SO, Starting Pitcher)
- Brooks Caple* (LU, SR, Starting Pitcher)
- Hunter Hesseltine* (LU, JR, Starting Pitcher)
- Gavin Galy* (NICH, RJR, Relief Pitcher)
- Kanin Dodge (LU, SR, Utility)

*-2023 Southland All-Conference Selection

==== Second Team ====
- Cameron Crotte (UIW, SR, 1st Base)
- Austin Roccaforte (LU, SR, 2nd Base)
- Dylan Mach (UNO, SR, 3rd Base)9
- Jake Haze* (SLU, GR, Shortstop)
- Bo Willis (NWST, SR, Catcher)
- River Orsak (LU, SR, Designated Hitter)
- Garrett Felix (NICH, SR, Outfielder)
- Cooper Hext (MCNS, SR, Outfielder)
- Christian Smith-Johnson (TAMUCC, SO, Outfielder)
- Chase Prestwich (NWST, JR, Starting Pitcher)
- Isaiah Zavala (UIW, GR, Starting Pitcher)
- Jacob Ellis (LU, SR, Starting Pitcher)
- Jackson Cleveland (LU, JR, Relief Pitcher)
- Grant Randall (UIW, SR, Utility)

*-2023 Southland All-Conference Selection

== Roster ==
2024 Lamar Cardinals baseball team
Players
Coaches

#	Pos.	Name	B/T	Height	Weight	Year	Home town
1	INF	Cameron Yadon	R/R	5 ft 11 in (1.8 m)	165 lb (75 kg)	So	Bridge City, TX
2	RHP	Andres Perez	R/R	5 ft 10 in (1.78 m)	185 lb (84 kg)	Jr	Cuauhtemoc, Chihuahua, Mexico
3	OF	River Orsak	R/R	5 ft 10 in (1.78 m)	190 lb (86 kg)	Sr	Mont Belvieu, TX
5	INF	Jack Schell	L/R	6 ft 0 in (1.83 m)	185 lb (84 kg)	Sr	Houston, TX
7	RHP	Carter Sutton	R/R	6 ft 4 in (1.93 m)	180 lb (82 kg)	Jr	Vancouver, WA
12	RHP	Brooks Caple	R/R	6 ft 6 in (1.98 m)	230 lb (104 kg)	Sr	Gunter, TX
13	INF	Ethan Ruiz	R/R	5 ft 8 in (1.73 m)	175 lb (79 kg)	Sr	Round Rock, TX
14	RHP	Trhea Morse	R/R	5 ft 10 in (1.78 m)	175 lb (79 kg)	Sr	Alvin, TX
16	INF	Kanin Dodge	R/R	5 ft 10 in (1.78 m)	180 lb (82 kg)	Sr	Carencro, LA
18	RHP	Zach Williams	R/R	6 ft 1 in (1.85 m)	195 lb (88 kg)	Sr	College Station, TX
19	INF	Peyton Sanderson	L/R	6 ft 0 in (1.83 m)	200 lb (91 kg)	Sr	Austin, TX
20	LHP	Jacob Ellis	L/L	6 ft 1 in (1.85 m)	175 lb (79 kg)	Sr	Edmond, OK
21	INF	Landon Roque	R/R	5 ft 11 in (1.8 m)	205 lb (93 kg)	Sr	Dickinson, TX
22	RHP	Gavin Green	R/R	5 ft 11 in (1.8 m)	160 lb (73 kg)	Sr	Bridge City, TX
23	RHP	Kole Tauzin	R/R	6 ft 0 in (1.83 m)	220 lb (100 kg)	Jr	Tomball, TX
30	RHP	Antonio Escano	R/R	6 ft 2 in (1.88 m)	195 lb (88 kg)	Sr	Santo Domingo, Dominican Republic
32	RHP	Foster Kruezer	R/R	6 ft 3 in (1.91 m)	220 lb (100 kg)	Sr	Anahuac, TX
33	RHP	Ethan Oceguera	R/R	6 ft 0 in (1.83 m)	180 lb (82 kg)	So	Bridge City, TX
34	C	Monray Van Der Walt	R/R	6 ft 0 in (1.83 m)	203 lb (92 kg)	Jr	Fulshear, TX
38	OF	Tanner Wilson	R/R	6 ft 1 in (1.85 m)	178 lb (81 kg)	Sr	Bridge City, TX
39	C	Easton Culp	R/R	6 ft 0 in (1.83 m)	195 lb (88 kg)	So	Salado, TX
42	OF	Luke Bumpus	R/L	5 ft 10 in (1.78 m)	181 lb (82 kg)	Sr	Wylie, TX
43	LHP	Hunter Hesseltine	L/L	6 ft 3 in (1.91 m)	190 lb (86 kg)	Jr	Topeka, KS
46	OF	Owen Sheldon	R/R	5 ft 9 in (1.75 m)	179 lb (81 kg)	Jr	Beaumont, TX
49	RHP	Jackson Cleveland	L/R	6 ft 0 in (1.83 m)	190 lb (86 kg)	Jr	Deer Park, TX
50	OF	Connor Kaiser	L/R	6 ft 0 in (1.83 m)	180 lb (82 kg)	Jr	College Station, TX
51	INF	Griffin Clark	R/R	5 ft 10 in (1.78 m)	180 lb (82 kg)	Jr	Midland, Michigan
52	C	Ryan Sosa	R/R	6 ft 0 in (1.83 m)	202 lb (92 kg)	So	Groves, TX
52	RHP	Patrick Hail	R/R	6 ft 0 in (1.83 m)	240 lb (109 kg)	RS Jr	Arlington, TX

Head coach

Will Davis – 8th season

Assistant coach(es)

Scott Hatten, Sean Snedeker, and Tod McDowell

Hitting coach(es)

Scott Hatten – 23rd season

Pitching coach(es)

Sean Snedeker – 7th season

Legend

- (C) Team captain
- (S) Suspended
- (I) Ineligible
- Injured
- Current redshirt

Roster
Last update: 2023-12-21

== Schedule and results ==
Legend
	Lamar win
	Lamar loss
	Postponement/Cancelation/Suspensions
**Bold**	Lamar team member
*	Non-Conference game
†	Make-Up Game

2024 Lamar Cardinals baseball game log
Regular season (41–13)

February (5–3)
Date	Opponent	Rank	Site/stadium	Score	Win	Loss	Save	TV	Attendance	Overall record	SLC Record
Mobile Baseball Tournament
Feb. 16	vs. Southern Indiana*		Eddie Stanky Field • Mobile, AL	4–2	**Havard, Peyton(1–0)**	Robinson, Trent(0–1)	**Cleveland, Jackson (1)**		1,141	1–0	
Feb. 17	at South Alabama*		Eddie Stanky Field • Mobile, AL	1–7	Carson Swilling (1–0)	**Caple, Brooks (0–1)**	None		1,052	1–1	
Feb. 18	vs. North Alabama*		Eddie Stanky Field • Mobile, AL	9–1	**Hesseltine, Hunter (1–0)**	Kevin Henrich (0–1)	None		856	2–1	
Feb. 20	at Baylor*		Baylor Ballpark • Waco, TX	5–11	Leach, Drew (1–0)	**Havard, Peyton (1–1)**	None	ESPN+	1,575	2–2	
Sugar Land Classic
Feb. 23	vs. UIC*		Constellation Field • Sugar Land, TX	8–7 (10 inn)	**Perez, Andres (1–0)**	TRAPANI, Vincent (0–1)	None		212	3–2	
Feb. 24	vs. Stephen F. Austin*		Constellation Field • Sugar Land, TX	5–0	**Caple, Brooks (1–1)**	Reid Boyett (0–1)	**Neal, Austin (1)**		532	4–2	
Feb. 25	vs. UTSA*		Constellation Field • Sugar Land, TX	5–3	**Hesseltine, Hunter (2–0)**	Davis, Braden (0–1)	**Perez, Andres (1)**		648	5–2	
Feb. 27	at Texas A&M*		Olsen Field at Blue Bell Park • College Station, TX	2–13 (7 inn)	Weston Moss (1–0)	**Havard, Peyton (1–2)**	None		5,161	5–3	

March (17–2)
Date	Opponent	Rank	Site/stadium	Score	Win	Loss	Save	TV	Attendance	Overall record	SLC Record
Mar 1	UT Arlington*		Vincent–Beck Stadium • Beaumont, TX	4–2	**Ellis, Jacob (1–0)**	Zach Norris (2–1)	**Perez, Andres (2)**	ESPN+	1,673	6–3	
Mar 2	UT Arlington*		Vincent–Beck Stadium • Beaumont, TX	1–3	Caylon Dygert (1–1)	**Caple, Brooks (1–2)**	None	ESPN+	1,253	6–4	
Mar 3	UT Arlington*		Vincent–Beck Stadium • Beaumont, TX	7–3	**Cleveland, Jackson (1–0)**	Austin Wallace (0–3)	None	ESPN+	1,103	7–4	
Mar 6	at Stephen F. Austin*		Jaycees Field • Nacogdoches, TX	11–4	**Morse, Trhea (1–0)**	R. Bowyer (0–1)	None	ESPN+	286	8–4	
Mar 8	UMBC*		Vincent–Beck Stadium • Beaumont, TX	7–3	**Ellis, Jacob (2–0)**	Luke Johnson (0–2)	**Neal, Austin (2)**	ESPN+	778	9–4	
Mar 9	UMBC*		Vincent–Beck Stadium • Beaumont, TX	4–0	**Caple, Brooks (2–2)**	Jayden Shertel (0–3)	None	ESPN+	769	10–4	
Mar 10	UMBC*		Vincent–Beck Stadium • Beaumont, TX	10–3	**Cleveland, Jackson (2–0)**	Ben Craig (0–2)	None	ESPN+	779	11–4	
Mar 12	Texas Southern*		Vincent–Beck Stadium • Beaumont, TX	9–3	**Morse, Trhea (2–0)**	James Malone (0–1)	None	ESPN+	818	12–4	
Mar 15	Pacific*		Vincent–Beck Stadium • Beaumont, TX	3–1	**Neal, Austin (1–0)**	McWilliam, Owen (0–1)	None	ESPN+	309	13–4	
Mar 16	Pacific*		Vincent–Beck Stadium • Beaumont, TX	5–1	**Jacob Ellis (3–0)**	Josh Souza (0–4)	**Perez, Andres (3)**	ESPN+		14–4	
Mar 16	Pacific*		Vincent–Beck Stadium • Beaumont, TX	3–0	**Hesseltine, Hunter (3–0)**	Guardado, Jakob (0–3)	**Cleveland, Jackson (2)**	ESPN+		15–4	
Mar 19	Prairie View A&M*		Vincent–Beck Stadium • Beaumont, TX	13–3 (8 inn)	**Moseley, Kyle (2–0)**	Tyson Carlton (0–2)	None	ESPN+	997	16–4	
Mar 23	at Houston Christian		Husky Field • Houston, TX	8–1	**Caple, Brooks (3–2)**	Willard, Nicholas (2–2)	None		312	17–4	1–0
Mar 23	at Houston Christian		Husky Field • Houston, TX	6–4	**Ellis, Jacob (4–0)**	Edwards, Parker (1–4)	Perez, Andres (4)		293	18–4	2–0
Mar 24	at Houston Christian		Husky Field • Houston, TX	11–9	**Moseley, Kyle (2–0)**	Hamilton, Jackson (0–1)	**Neal, Austin (3)**	ESPN+	293	19–4	3–0
Mar 26	at Houston*		Schroeder Park • Houston, TX	4–6	Luzardo, Diego (2–0)	**Hamm, Logan (0–1)**	Murray, Justin (3)	ESPN+	1,083	19–5	
Mar 28	at Oklahoma*	25	L. Dale Mitchell Baseball Park • Norman, OK	12–10	**Phelps, Travis (1–0)**	Atwood, Carson (0–1)	**Neal, Austin (4)**	ESPN+	840	20–5	
Mar 29	at Oklahoma*	25	L. Dale Mitchell Baseball Park • Norman, OK	13–8	**Caple, Brooks (4–2)**	Davis, Braden (2–2)	None	ESPN+	1,296	21–5	
Mar 30	at Oklahoma*	25	L. Dale Mitchell Baseball Park • Norman, OK	6–3	**Ellis, Jacob (5–0)**	Witherspoon, Kyson (2–2)	**Neal, Austin (5)**	ESPN+	1,790	22–5	

April (12–3)
Date	Opponent	Rank	Site/stadium	Score	Win	Loss	Save	TV	Attendance	Overall record	SLC Record
Apr 2	Sam Houston*		Vincent–Beck Stadium • Beaumont, TX	11–3	**Cleveland, Jackson (3–0)**	Ryan Peterson (1–1)	None	ESPN+	1,568	23–5	
Battle of the Border (Rivalry)
Apr 5	McNeese		Vincent–Beck Stadium • Beaumont, TX	2–4	Cameron LeJeune (4–2)	**Caple, Brooks (4–3)**	JT Moeller (1)	ESPN+	1,847	23–6	3–1
Apr 6	McNeese		Vincent–Beck Stadium • Beaumont, TX	1–0 (11 inn)	**Neal, Austin (2–0)**	Daelan Caraway (2–2)	None	ESPN+	2,067	24–6	4–1
Apr 7	McNeese		Vincent–Beck Stadium • Beaumont, TX	4–3	**Perez, Andres (2–0)**	JT Moeller (2–2)	None	ESPN+	1,377	25–6	5–1
Apr 9	Stephen F. Austin*		Vincent–Beck Stadium • Beaumont, TX	7–2	**Morse, Trhea (3–0)**	Skyler Jaco (1–4)	None	ESPN+	814	26–6	
Apr 12	Southeastern Louisiana		Vincent–Beck Stadium • Beaumont, TX	2–1	**Caple, Brooks (5–3)**	Stuprich, Brennan (3–3)	**Neal, Austin (6)**	ESPN+	1,607	27–6	6–1
Apr 13	Southeastern Louisiana		Vincent–Beck Stadium • Beaumont, TX	10–3	**Ellis, Jacob (6–0)**	Bennett, Levi (1–1)	**Cleveland, Jackson (3)**	ESPN+	1,774	28–6	7–1
Apr 14	Southeastern Louisiana		Vincent–Beck Stadium • Beaumont, TX	8–2	**Hesseltine, Hunter (4–0)**	Polk, Lakin (4–2)	None	ESPN+	1,317	29–6	8–1
Apr 19	at Texas A&M–Corpus Christi		Chapman Field • Corpus Christi, TX	3–6	Soliz, Cam (2–0)	Neal, Austin (2–1)	None	ESPN+	350	29–7	8–2
Apr 20	at Texas A&M–Corpus Christi		Chapman Field • Corpus Christi, TX	6–3	**Ellis, Jacob (7–0)**	Hunsaker, Riley (4–4)	Perez, Andres (5)	ESPN+	250	30–7	9–2
Apr 21	at Texas A&M–Corpus Christi		Chapman Field • Corpus Christi, TX	3–7	Garcia, Zach (4–0)	**Hesseltine, Hunter (4–1)**	None	ESPN+	382	30–8	9–3
Apr 22	at UT Rio Grande Valley*		UTRGV Baseball Stadium • Edinburg, TX		**Cancelled – Weather**	(-)					
Apr 24	Texas Southern*		Vincent–Beck Stadium • Beaumont, TX	20–2	**Morse, Trhea (4–0)**	Joseph Villarreal (0–1)	None	ESPN+	1,577	31–8	
Apr 26	Incarnate Word		Vincent–Beck Stadium • Beaumont, TX	11–3	**Moseley, Kyle (3–0)**	Rodriguez, Luis (0–1)	None	ESPN+	1,307	32–8	10–3
Apr 27	Incarnate Word		Vincent–Beck Stadium • Beaumont, TX	3–2	**Cleveland, Jackson (4–0)**	Byrd, Adam (0–2)	**Perez, Andres (6)**	ESPN+	1,011	33–8	11–3
Apr 28	Incarnate Word		Vincent–Beck Stadium • Beaumont, TX	8–2	**Hesseltine, Hunter (5–1)**	Hargett, Hunter (2–1)	None	ESPN+	1,009	34–8	12–3

May (7–5)
Date	Opponent	Rank	Site/stadium	Score	Win	Loss	Save	TV	Attendance	Overall record	SLC Record
May 1	Rice*		Vincent–Beck Stadium • Beaumont, TX	6–8	Tyler Hamilton (1–4)	**Morse, Trhea (4–1**)	Davion Hickson (6)	ESPN+	1,885	34–9	
May 3	Northwestern State		Vincent–Beck Stadium • Beaumont, TX	8–4	**Caple, Brooks (6–3)**	Prestwich, Chase (4–5)	None	ESPN+	1,493	35–9	13–3
May 4	Northwestern State		Vincent–Beck Stadium • Beaumont, TX	0–2	Newton, Aidan (2–3)	**Ellis, Jacob (7–1)**	Bunch, Caleb (3)	ESPN+	2,162	35–10	13–4
May 5	Northwestern State		Vincent–Beck Stadium • Beaumont, TX	7–1	**Hesseltine, Hunter (6–1)**	Flowers, Dawson (2–4)	**Cleveland, Jackson (4)**	ESPN+	1,623	36–10	14–4
May 8	at Rice*		Reckling Park • Houston, TX	8–4	**Peyton Havard (1–2)**	Tucker Alch (0–2)	None	ESPN+	2,562	37–10	
May 10	at Nicholls		Ben Meyer Diamond at Ray E. Didier Field • Thibodaux, LA	4–5 (11 inn)	Saltaformaggio, Nico (5–4)	**Havard, Peyton (2–3)**	None	ESPN+	833	37–11	14–5
May 11	at Nicholls		Ben Meyer Diamond at Ray E. Didier Field • Thibodaux, LA	9–7 (11 inn)	**Neal, Austin (3–1)**	Rodriguez, Arturo (2–3)	None	ESPN+	667	38–11	15–5
May 12	at Nicholls		Ben Meyer Diamond at Ray E. Didier Field • Thibodaux, LA	0–3	Saltaformaggio, Nico (6–4)	**Hesseltine, Hunter (6–2)**	None	ESPN+	608	38–12	15–6
May 14	Alcorn State*		Vincent–Beck Stadium • Beaumont, TX	13–3 (7 inn)	**Sutton, Carter (1–0)**	Hayden Konkler (0–2)	None	ESPN+	1,760	39–12	
May 16	at New Orleans		Maestri Field at Privateer Park • New Orleans, LA	12–3	**Caple, Brooks (7–3)**	Mercer, Colton (6–5)	None	ESPN+	495	40–12	16–6
May 16	at New Orleans		Maestri Field at Privateer Park • New Orleans, LA	10–9	**Cleveland, Jackson (5–0)**	Tyson-Long, Kyrin (1–1)	**Neal, Austin (7)**	ESPN+	488	41–12	17–6
May 17	at New Orleans		Maestri Field at Privateer Park • New Orleans, LA	8–10	Cortez Dennis (1–3)	**Hunter Hesseltine** (6–2)	Bryce Calloway (1)	ESPN+	479	41–13	17–7

Postseason ( 3–2 )

Southland Conference Tournament ( 3–2 )
Date	Opponent	(Seed)/Rank	Site/stadium	Score	Win	Loss	Save	TV	Attendance	Overall record	Tournament record
May 22	vs. (8) Incarnate Word	(1)	Pat Kenelly Diamond at Alumni Field; Hammond, LA	3–6	Byrd, Adam(1–3)	**Perez, Andres(2–1)**	None	ESPN+		41–14	0–1
May 23	vs. (4) Northwestern State	(1)	Pat Kenelly Diamond at Alumni Field; Hammond, LA	12–5	**Ellis, Jacob(8–1)**	Flowers, Dawson(4–5)	None	ESPN+		42–14	1–1
May 24	vs. (8) Incarnate Word	(1)	Pat Kenelly Diamond at Alumni Field; Hammond, LA	18–6 (7 inn)	**Hesseltine, Hunter(7–3)**	Berens, Micah(2–4)	None	ESPN+		43–14	2–1
May 24	vs. (5) McNeese	(1)	Pat Kenelly Diamond at Alumni Field; Hammond, LA	18–9	**Perez, Andres(3–1)**	Brock Barthelemy(3–1)	None	ESPN+		44–14	3–1
May 25	vs. (5) McNeese	(1)	Pat Kenelly Diamond at Alumni Field; Hammond, LA	4–14 (7 inn)	Ty Abraham(4–3)	**Morse, Trhea(4–1)**	None	ESPN+		44–15	3–2

Legend: = Win = Loss = Canceled
Bold = Lamar team member
Rankings are based on the team's current ranking in the D1Baseball poll.

== National recognition ==
The Cardinals appeared in the top 25 in three national polls during the week of April 14. They were ranked #24 in the April 14 College Baseball nation poll. On April 15, the Cardinals were ranked #24 in the Baseball America poll. The same day, the Cardinals were ranked #25 in the Perfect Game poll. The Cardinals dropped out of both polls the following week after losing two of three games in a conference series against Texas A&M–Corpus Christi.

== Conference awards and honors ==
Head coach Will Davis was named Southland Conference Coach of the Year. Brooks Caple was named Pitcher of the Year.

=== 2024 All-Southland Conference team ===
Brooks Caple was named to the conference first team. Zak Skinner, Brayden Evans, River Orsak, Jacob Ellis, and Hunter Hesseltine were named as conference second team members. Kanin Dodge was named to the conference All–Defensive team.

==== First Team ====
- Miguel Useche (UNO, SR, Catcher)
- Edgar Alvarez (NICH, SR, 1st Base)
- Isaac Webb (TAMUCC, RJR, 2nd Base)
- TJ Salvaggio (SLU, JR, Shortstop)
- Shea Thomas (SLU, SR, 3rd Base)
- Mitchell Sanford (UNO, RJR, Outfielder)
- Samuel Benjamin (HCU, SR, Outfielder)
- Cooper Hext (MCN, SR, Outfielder)
- Dalton Beck (UIW, JR, Designated Hitter)
- Bryce Calloway (UNO, JR, Utility)
- Brooks Caple (LU, SR, Starting Pitcher)
- Colton Mercer (UNO, JR, Starting Pitcher)
- Brennan Stuprich (SLU, RJR, Starting Pitcher)
- Nico Saltaformaggio (NICH, SR, Relief Pitcher)

==== Second Team ====
- Zak Skinner (LU, JR, Catcher)
- Brayden Evans (LU, JR, 1st Base)
- Diego Villescas (UNO, JR, 2nd Base)
- Parker Coddou (NICH, JR, Shortstop)
- Sebastian Trinidad (TAMUCC, SR, 3rd Base)
- Reese Lipoma (NWST, JR, Outfielder)
- Basiel Williams (NICH, RSR, Outfielder)
- Cameron Caley (UIW, SR, Outfielder)
- River Orsak (LU, SR, Designaterd Hitter)
- Drake Anderson (NICH, JR, Utility)
- Matthew Watson (TAMUCC, RJR, Starting Pitcher)
- Jacob Ellis (LU, SR, Starting Pitcher)
- Hunter Hesseltine (LU, JR, Starting Pitcher)
- Caleb Bunch (NWST, JR, Relief Pitcher)

==== 2024 All-Southland Defensive team ====
- Miguel Useche (UNO, JR, Catcher)
- Edgar Alvarez (NICH, SR, 1st Base)
- Dalton Hurst (UNO, JR, 2nd Base)
- Kanin Dodge (LU, SR, Shortstop)
- Rocco Gump (NWST, JR, 3rd Base)
- Cooper Hext (MCN, SR, Left Fielder)
- Conner Westenburg (MCN, JR, Center Fielder)
- Mitchell Sanford (UNO, SR, Right Fielder)
- Cameron LeJeune (MCN, RJR, Pitcher)

=== Weekly awards ===
Weekly honors
Honors	Player	Position	Date Awarded	Ref.
SLC Pitcher of the Week	Brooks Caple	RHP	February 26, 2024	
SLC Pitcher of the Week	Hunter Hesseltine	LHP	March 18, 2024	
Hitter of the Week	Zak Skinner	C	April 1, 2024	
SLC Pitcher of the Week	Jacob Ellis	LHP	April 8, 2024	
SLC Pitcher of the Week	Brooks Caple	RHP	April 15, 2024	
SLC Pitcher of the Week	Hunter Hesseltine	LHP	April 29, 2024	

== Rankings ==
Ranking movements Legend: ██ Increase in ranking ██ Decrease in ranking — = Not ranked RV = Received votes
	Week																		
Poll	Pre	1	2	3	4	5	6	7	8	9	10	11	12	13	14	15	16	17	Final
Coaches'	—	—*	—	—	—	—	RV	RV	RV	RV	RV	RV	—	RV	RV				
Baseball America	—	—	—	—	—	RV	RV	RV	RV	24	—	—	—	—	—				
NCBWA†	—	—	—	—	—	—	RV	RV	RV	RV	RV	RV	RV	RV	RV				
D1Baseball	—	—	—	—	—	—	—	—	—	—	—	—	—	—	—				
Perfect Game	—	—	—	—	—	—	—	RV	—	25	—	—	—	—	—				

† NCBWA ranks 30 teams in their preseason poll, but only ranks 25 teams weekly during the season.
* A new poll was not released for this week, so for comparison purposes, the previous week's ranking is inserted in this week's slot.

== See also ==
2024 Lamar Lady Cardinals softball team
