= 2024 Southeastern Louisiana Lions baseball team =

NCAA Division I baseball season

2024 Southeastern Louisiana Lions baseball
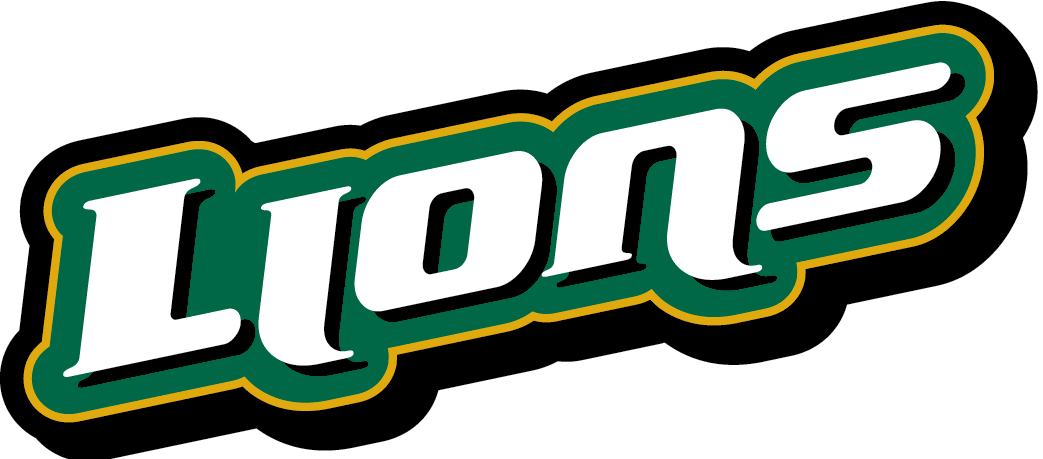
- Conference: Southland Conference
- Record: 30–28 (10–14 Southland)
- Head coach: Bobby Barbier (1st season)
- Assistant coaches: Taylor Dugas; Evan Bush; Spencer Goodwin
- Home stadium: Pat Kenelly Diamond at Alumni Field

2024 Southland Conference baseball standings
	Conf.				Overall
Team	W		L	PCT	W		L	PCT
Lamar ‍†‍‍	17	–	7	.708	44	–	15	.746
Nicholls ‍‍‡‍^{y}	16	–	8	.667	38	–	22	.633
New Orleans ‍‍‍	14	–	10	.583	31	–	26	.544
McNeese ‍‍‍	11	–	13	.458	32	–	27	.542
Northwestern State ‍‍‍	11	–	13	.458	22	–	33	.400
Southeastern Louisiana ‍‍‍	10	–	14	.417	30	–	28	.517
Texas A&M–Corpus Christi ‍‍‍	10	–	14	.417	22	–	35	.386
Incarnate Word ‍‍‍	10	–	14	.417	26	–	31	.456
Houston Christian ‍‍‍	9	–	15	.375	18	–	31	.367
† – Conference champion ‡ – Tournament champion y – Invited to the NCAA Tournament; As of June 1, 2024; Rankings from D1Baseball

The 2024 Southeastern Louisiana Lions baseball team represented Southeastern Louisiana University during the 2024 NCAA Division I baseball season. The Lions played their home games at Pat Kenelly Diamond at Alumni Field were led by first–year head coach Bobby Barbier. They are members of the Southland Conference. They compiled a 30–28 overall record. They completed conference play in a three-way tie for sixth place with a 10–14 record. Qualifying for the SLC tournament as the 6th seeded team, the Lions had a 2–2 record defeating 3rd seeded New Orleans two times, 10–2 and 11–5, and losing to 2nd seeded Nicholls, 4–5 and 3–4.

== Previous season ==
The Lions had a regular season record of 25–25 and a conference record of 9–14 finishing in eighth place in SLC play. They did not qualify for the 2023 Southland Conference baseball tournament.

== Preseason ==
=== Southland Conference Coaches Poll ===
The Southland Conference Coaches Poll was released on February 8, 2024. Southwestern Louisiana was picked to finish seventh the Southland Conference with 53 votes.

Coaches poll
Predicted finish	Team	Votes (1st place)
1	Nicholls	126 (14)
2	Lamar	106 (1)
3	New Orleans	92 (3)
4	Incarnate Word	81
5	McNeese	67
6	Texas A&M–Corpus Christi	55
7	Southeastern Louisiana	53
8	Northwestern State	42
9	Houston Christian	26

=== Preseason All-Southland team ===
Jake Haze was named to the conference preseason second team.

==== First Team ====
- Edgar Alvarez* (NICH, SR, 1st Base)
- MaCrae Kendrick (NICH, SR, 2nd Base)
- Ethan Ruiz (LU, SR, 3rd Base)
- Parker Coddou* (NICH, SR, Shortstop)
- Miguel Useche (UNO, SR, Catcher)
- Rey Mendoza* (UIW, GR, Designated Hitter)
- Mitchell Sanford* (UNO, RJR, Outfielder)
- Samuel Benjamin* (HCU, SR, Outfielder)
- Issac Williams (UNO, SR, Outfielder)
- Jacob Mayers* (NICH, SO, Starting Pitcher)
- Brooks Caple* (LU, SR, Starting Pitcher)
- Hunter Hesseltine* (LU, JR, Starting Pitcher)
- Gavin Galy* (NICH, RJR, Relief Pitcher)
- Kanin Dodge (LU, SR, Utility)

*-2023 Southland All-Conference Selection

==== Second Team ====
- Cameron Crotte (UIW, SR, 1st Base)
- Austin Roccaforte (LU, SR, 2nd Base)
- Dylan Mach (UNO, SR, 3rd Base)
- Jake Haze* (SLU, GR, Shortstop)
- Bo Willis (NWST, SR, Catcher)
- River Orsak (LU, SR, Designated Hitter)
- Garrett Felix (NICH, SR, Outfielder)
- Cooper Hext (MCNS, SR, Outfielder)
- Christian Smith-Johnson (TAMUCC, SO, Outfielder)
- Chase Prestwich (NWST, JR, Starting Pitcher)
- Isaiah Zavala (UIW, GR, Starting Pitcher)
- Jacob Ellis (LU, SR, Starting Pitcher)
- Jackson Cleveland (LU, JR, Relief Pitcher)
- Isaiah Zavala (UIW, SR, Utility)

*-2023 Southland All-Conference Selection

== Personnel ==
2023 Southeastern Louisiana Lions baseball team
Players
Coaches

#	Pos.	Name	B/T	Height	Weight	Year	Home town
1	OF	Parker Coley	R/R	6 ft 1 in (1.85 m)	194 lb (88 kg)	Jr	Sterlington, Louisiana
2	INF	Jake Haze	L/R	5 ft 9 in (1.75 m)	175 lb (79 kg)	Gr	Highlands Ranch, Colorado
3	OF	Dane Watts	L/L	5 ft 8 in (1.73 m)	158 lb (72 kg)	So	Hammond, Louisiana
4	OF	Jude Hall	L/R	5 ft 11 in (1.8 m)	193 lb (88 kg)	Jr	Chilliwack, British Columbia, Canada
5	RHP	Carson Robb (redshirt)	R/R	6 ft 2 in (1.88 m)	205 lb (93 kg)	Fr	Vancleave, Mississippi
6	RHP	Levi Bennett	R/R	5 ft 11 in (1.8 m)	179 lb (81 kg)	Sr	Bella Vista, Arkansas
7	RHP	Brennan Stuprich (redshirt)	R/R	5 ft 10 in (1.78 m)	210 lb (95 kg)	Jr	Kenner, Louisiana
9	LHP	Chance Vaught	L/L	6 ft 1 in (1.85 m)	182 lb (83 kg)	Sr	Daphne, Alabama
10	INF	Jeremy Rader	R/R	5 ft 11 in (1.8 m)	188 lb (85 kg)	Jr	Springfield, Missouri
11	RHP	Mason Creacy	R/R	6 ft 0 in (1.83 m)	197 lb (89 kg)	Sr	Willis, Texas
12	OF	Dom Regira (redshirt)	L/R	6 ft 1 in (1.85 m)	186 lb (84 kg)	Fr	Gonzales, Louisiana
13	RHP	Josh Lee	R/R	5 ft 11 in (1.8 m)	209 lb (95 kg)	Fr	Gulfport, Mississippi
14	C	Reese Dean	L/L	5 ft 10 in (1.78 m)	178 lb (81 kg)	Fr	Denham Springs, Louisiana
15	INF	TJ Salvaggio	R/R	6 ft 2 in (1.88 m)	190 lb (86 kg)	Jr	Slidell, Louisiana
16	INF	Rhett Rosevear	L/R	5 ft 10 in (1.78 m)	190 lb (86 kg)	Sr	Denham Springs, Louisiana
17	RHP	Aiden Vosburg	R/R	6 ft 2 in (1.88 m)	193 lb (88 kg)	Jr	Jarreau, Louisiana
18	OF	Christian Garcia	R/R	5 ft 11 in (1.8 m)	183 lb (83 kg)	Gr	Slidell, Louisiana
19	RHP	Chase Ambrose	R/R	6 ft 0 in (1.83 m)	204 lb (93 kg)	Fr	Huntsville, Alabama
20	LHP	Harris Waghalter	L/L	6 ft 1 in (1.85 m)	155 lb (70 kg)	Fr	Baton Rouge, Louisiana
21	RHP	Jimmie Johnson (redshirt)	R/R	6 ft 1 in (1.85 m)	168 lb (76 kg)	Fr	Zachary, Louisiana
22	OF	Cole Stromboe (redshirt)	L/L	5 ft 10 in (1.78 m)	176 lb (80 kg)	Jr	River Ridge, Louisiana
23		Peyton Woods	L/R	6 ft 1 in (1.85 m)	196 lb (89 kg)	Fr	Albany, Louisiana
24	INF	Lakin Polk	L/R	6 ft 3 in (1.91 m)	220 lb (100 kg)	So	Ponchatoula, Louisiana
25	RHP	Dakota Lee (redshirt)	R/R	6 ft 3 in (1.91 m)	172 lb (78 kg)	Jr	Purvis, Mississippi
26	C	Justin Williams	R/R	6 ft 2 in (1.88 m)	193 lb (88 kg)	Sr	Madison, Mississippi
27	RHP	Dalton Aspholm	R/R	6 ft 0 in (1.83 m)	218 lb (99 kg)	Gr	Baton Rouge, Louisiana
28	UTL	Jake Killingsworth	R/R	5 ft 10 in (1.78 m)	225 lb (102 kg)	Sr	Headland, Alabama
29	RHP	Will Kinzeler	L/R	6 ft 5 in (1.96 m)	204 lb (93 kg)	Sr	Covington, Louisiana
30	INF	Shea Thomas	R/R	6 ft 3 in (1.91 m)	202 lb (92 kg)		Olympia, Washington
31	C	Gray Rowlett	R/R	6 ft 5 in (1.96 m)	210 lb (95 kg)	Jr	Keller, Texas
32	RHP	Lance Lauve	R/R	5 ft 11 in (1.8 m)	208 lb (94 kg)	Jr	Madisonville, Louisiana
34	UTL	Conner O'Neal	L/R	6 ft 3 in (1.91 m)	216 lb (98 kg)	Jr	Waverly Hall, Georgia
35	C	Ryan Brome	L/R	6 ft 1 in (1.85 m)	206 lb (93 kg)	Jr	Katy, Texas
36	LHP	Jackson Rodriguez	R/L	6 ft 0 in (1.83 m)	185 lb (84 kg)	Sr	Kingwood, Texas
37	RHP	Hayden Robb	R/R	6 ft 2 in (1.88 m)	215 lb (98 kg)	Gr	Vancleave, Mississippi
38	LHP	Larson Fabre (redshirt)	R/L	6 ft 0 in (1.83 m)	187 lb (85 kg)	Fr	Denham Springs, Louisiana
39	C	Michael Curry	R/R	5 ft 11 in (1.8 m)	187 lb (85 kg)	Jr	Brusly, Louisiana
40		Dom Letort	L/L	6 ft 1 in (1.85 m)	201 lb (91 kg)	Fr	Mandeville, Louisiana
41	C	Ethan Butler (redshirt)	R/R	6 ft 1 in (1.85 m)	203 lb (92 kg)	So	Baton Rouge, Louisiana
42	RHP	Kaleb Howell	R/R	6 ft 6 in (1.98 m)	213 lb (97 kg)	Fr	Denham Springs,, Louisiana
44	UTL	Bailyn Sorensen	R/R	6 ft 2 in (1.88 m)	220 lb (100 kg)	Jr	Rayville, Louisiana
45	RHP	Triston Todorowski (redshirt)	R/R	6 ft 0 in (1.83 m)	189 lb (86 kg)	Jr	Toledo, Ohio

Head coach

Bobby Barbier (Northwestern State)

Assistant coach(es)

Taylor Dugas (Alabama)
Evan Bush (Alabama)
Spencer Goodwin (Northwestern State)

Legend

- (C) Team captain
- (S) Suspended
- (I) Ineligible
- Injured
- Current redshirt

Roster
Last update: 12 July 2024

== Schedule and results ==
Legend
	Southeastern Louisiana win
	Southeastern Louisiana loss
	Postponement/Cancelation/Suspensions
**Bold**	Southeastern Louisiana team member
*	Non-Conference game
†	Make-Up Game

2024 Southeastern Louisiana Lions baseball game log
Regular season (28–26)

February (6–3)
Date	Opponent	Rank	Site/stadium	Score	Win	Loss	Save	TV	Attendance	Overall record	SLC Record
Feb. 16	Tarleton State*		Pat Kenelly Diamond at Alumni Field • Hammond, LA	4–9	Garza, Grant (1-0)	**Vosburg, Aiden (0-1)**	None	ESPN+	1,264	0–1	
Feb. 17	Tarleton State*		Pat Kenelly Diamond at Alumni Field • Hammond, LA	2–0	**Rodriguez, Jackson (1-0)**	Haley, Matt (0-1)	**Lauve, Lance (1)**	ESPN+	1,065	1–1	
Feb. 18	Tarleton State*		Pat Kenelly Diamond at Alumni Field • Hammond, LA	5–2	**Kinzeler, Will (1-0)**	Risley, Braydon (0-1)	**Polk, Lakin (1)**	ESPN+	1,145	2–1	
Feb. 21	at South Alabama*		Eddie Stanky Field • Mobile, Al	8–1	Cooksey, Cooper (1-0)	**Robb, Hayden (0-1)**	None	ESPN+	1,004	2–2	
Feb. 23	at UAB*		Jerry D. Young Memorial Field • Birmingham, Al	2–3	BLAZYE BERRY (1-0)	**Stuprich, Brennan (0-1)**	BEN ABERNATHY (2)	ESPN+	330	2–3	
Feb. 24	at UAB*		Jerry D. Young Memorial Field • Birmingham, Al	6–3	**Rodriguez, Jackson (2-0)**	B HOUSE (0-1)	None		221	3–3	
Feb. 25	at UAB*		Jerry D. Young Memorial Field • Birmingham, Al	14–7	**Polk, Lakin (1-0**	BEN ABERNATHY (0-1)	None	ESPN+	316	4–3	
Feb. 27	Xavier (LA)*		Pat Kenelly Diamond at Alumni Field • Hammond, LA	22–7	**Robb, Carson (1-0)**	Davis, Kimani (1-2)	None	ESPN+	1,554	5–3	
Feb. 28	Mississippi Valley State*		Pat Kenelly Diamond at Alumni Field • Hammond, LA	12–0	**Robb, Hayden (1-0)**	BRAYDEN EFTINK (0-1)	None	ESPN+	1,387	6–3	

March (12–7)
Date	Opponent	Rank	Site/stadium	Score	Win	Loss	Save	TV	Attendance	Overall record	SLC Record
Keith LeClair Classic
Mar 1	vs Cal State Fullerton*		Clark–LeClair Stadium • Greenville, NC	5–1	**Stuprich, Brennan (1-1)**	Rodriguez, Christian (1-2)	None			7–3	
Mar 2	vs Purdue*		Clark–LeClair Stadium • Greenville, NC	0–5	WAGNER, Luke (2-0)	**Lee, Dakota (0-1)**	DANNELLEY, Jackson (3)			7–4	
Mar 3	at East Carolina*	11	Clark–LeClair Stadium • Greenville, NC	11–9	**Polk, Lakin (2-0)**	HUNTER, Jake (1-1)	**Rodriguez, Jackson (1)**	ESPN+	4,511	8–4	
Mar 5	at Alcorn State*		Foster Baseball Field at McGowan Stadium • Lorman, MS	12–2	**Robb, Carson (2-0)**	Hayden Konkler (0-1)	None		1,007	9–4	
Mar 6	LSU*	2	Pat Kenelly Diamond at Alumni Field • Hammond, LA	3–4	Gavin Guidry (1-0)	**Rodriguez, Jackson (2-1)**	Nate Ackenhausen (1)	ESPN+	3,751	9–5	
Mar 8	North Dakota State*		Pat Kenelly Diamond at Alumni Field • Hammond, LA	3–6	Nolan Johnson (1-0)	**Stuprich, Brennan (1-2)**	Joey Danielson (1)	ESPN+	1,396	9–6	
Mar 9	North Dakota State*		Pat Kenelly Diamond at Alumni Field • Hammond, LA	8–6	**Polk, Lakin (3-0)**	Leland Wilson (1-1)	Rodriguez, Jackson (2)	ESPN+	1,115	10–6	
Mar 10	North Dakota State*		Pat Kenelly Diamond at Alumni Field • Hammond, LA	11–10	**Fabre, Larson (1-0)**	Joey Danielson (0-3)	None	ESPN+	1,287	11–6	
Mar 12	Tulane*pp		Pat Kenelly Diamond at Alumni Field • Hammond, LA	8–7	**Polk, Lakin (4-0)**	Jake Saum (0-3)	**Rodriguez, Jackson (3)**	ESPN+	1,661	12–6	
Mar 16	Saint Louis*		Pat Kenelly Diamond at Alumni Field • Hammond, LA	10–8	**Bennett, Levi (1-0)**	Jackson Holmes (4-1)	**Rodriguez, Jackson (4)**	ESPN+	1,332	13–6	
Mar 16	Saint Louis*		Pat Kenelly Diamond at Alumni Field • Hammond, LA	9–8	**Dalton Aspholm (1-0)**	Ethan Bell (-)	**Lakin Polk (2)**	ESPN+	1,238	14–6	
Mar 17	Saint Louis*		Pat Kenelly Diamond at Alumni Field • Hammond, LA	–	(-)	Cancelled	()	ESPN+		–	
Mar 19	LSU–Alexandria*		Pat Kenelly Diamond at Alumni Field • Hammond, LA	17–5 (7 inn)	**Robb, Hayden (2-0)**	Colin LaCombe (1-3)	None	ESPN+	1,325	15–6	
Mar 22	at Northwestern State		H. Alvin Brown–C. C. Stroud Field • Natchitoches, LA	5–0	**Stuprich, Brennan (2-2)**	Prestwich, Chase (2-3)	None	ESPN+	923	16–6	1–0
Mar 23	at Northwestern State		H. Alvin Brown–C. C. Stroud Field • Natchitoches, LA	8–5	**Lauve, Lance (1-0)**	Bryan, Tyler (0-1)	Polk, Lakin (3)	ESPN+	843	17–6	2–0
Mar 24	at Northwestern State		H. Alvin Brown–C. C. Stroud Field • Natchitoches, LA	8–11	Marionneaux, Dylan (1-4)	**Kinzeler, Will (1-1)**	Anderson, Austin (1)	ESPN+	783	17–7	2–1
Mar 26	at LSU	7	Alex Box Stadium, Skip Bertman Field • Baton Rouge, LA	4–8	Justin Loer (2-0)	**Robb, Hayden (2-1)**	None	SECN+	10,517	17–8	
Mar 28	Houston Christian		Pat Kenelly Diamond at Alumni Field • Hammond, LA	11–1 (7 inn)	**Stuprich, Brennan (3-2)**	Willard, Nicholas (2-3)	None	ESPN+	1,343	18–8	3–1
Mar 29	Houston Christian		Pat Kenelly Diamond at Alumni Field • Hammond, LA	2–9	Edwards, Parker (2-3)	**Lee, Dakota (0-2)**	None	ESPN+	1,332	18–9	3–2
Mar 30	Houston Christian		Pat Kenelly Diamond at Alumni Field • Hammond, LA	0–7	Gunter, Rye (1-0)	**Kinzeler, Will (1-2)**	Feltman, Jett (1)	ESPN+	1,290	18–10	3–3

April (4–12)
Date	Opponent	Rank	Site/stadium	Score	Win	Loss	Save	TV	Attendance	Overall record	SLC Record
Apr 2	Southern Miss*		Pat Kenelly Diamond at Alumni Field • Hammond, LA	7–6	**Rodriguez, Jackson (3-1)**	Allen, Colby (3-2)	None	ESPN+	1,622	19–10	
Apr 5	Nicholls		Pat Kenelly Diamond at Alumni Field • Hammond, LA	7–8	Desandro, Devin (3-2)	Polk, Lakin (4-1)	None	ESPN+	1,420	19–11	3–4
Apr 6	Nicholls		Pat Kenelly Diamond at Alumni Field • Hammond, LA	3–7	Guerrero, Michael (2-0)	**Lee, Dakota (0-3)**	None	ESPN+	1,409	19–12	3–5
Apr 7	Nicholls		Pat Kenelly Diamond at Alumni Field • Hammond, LA	5–9	Quevedo, Michael (4-0)	**Kinzeler, Will (1-3)**	Galy, Gavin (2)	ESPN+	1,337	19–13	3–6
Apr 9	at Southern Miss*		Pete Taylor Park • Hattiesburg, MS	1–5	Best, Chandler (2-0)	**Robb, Hayden (2-2)**	Sivley, Kros (3)	ESPN+	5,178	19–14	
Apr 12	at Lamar		Vincent–Beck Stadium • Beaumont, TX	1–2	Caple, Brooks (5-3)	**Stuprich, Brennan (3-3)**	Neal, Austin (6)	ESPN+	1,607	19–15	3–7
Apr 13	at Lamar		Vincent–Beck Stadium • Beaumont, TX	3–10	Ellis, Jacob (6-0)	**Bennett, Levi (1-1)**	Cleveland, Jackson (3)	ESPN+	1,774	19–16	3–8
Apr 14	at Lamar		Vincent–Beck Stadium • Beaumont, TX	2–8	Hesseltine, Hunter (4-0)	**Polk, Lakin (4-2)**	None	ESPN+	1,317	19–17	3–9
Apr 16	Louisiana*	14	Pat Kenelly Diamond at Alumni Field • Hammond, LA	8–15	JT Etheridge (2-2)	**Kinzeler, Will (1-4)**	None	ESPN+	1,616	19–18	
Apr 17	Louisiana*	14	Pat Kenelly Diamond at Alumni Field • Hammond, LA	8–15	JT Etheridge (2-2)	**Kinzeler, Will (1-4)**	None	ESPN+	1,616	19–18	
Apr 23	Alcorn State*		Pat Kenelly Diamond at Alumni Field • Hammond, LA	15–3 (7 inn)	**Robb, Carson (3-0)**	Andres Chirinos (0-7)	Howell, Kaleb (1)	ESPN+	1,380	20–19	
Apr 24	Alcorn State*		Pat Kenelly Diamond at Alumni Field • Hammond, LA	9–1	**Robb, Hayden (3-2)**	Myles Dew (0-3)	None	ESPN+	1,209	21–19	
Apr 26	at McNeese		Joe Miller Ballpark • Lake Charles, LA	8–9	Ty Abraham (2-2)	**Fabre, Larson (1-1)**	Cameron LeJeune (4)	ESPN+	990	21–20	3–10
Apr 27	at McNeese		Joe Miller Ballpark • Lake Charles, LA	12–3	**Lee, Dakota (1-3)**	Kainin Morrow (3-2)	None	ESPN+	1,061	22–20	4–10
Apr 28	at McNeese		Joe Miller Ballpark • Lake Charles, LA	5–9	LeJeune, Cameron (5-2)	**Vosburg, Aiden (0-4)**	None	ESPN+	953	22–21	4–11
Apr 30	at Tulane*		Greer Field at Turchin Stadium • New Orleans, LA	6–13	Jonah Wachter (1-0)	**Robb, Carson (3-1)**	None	ESPN+	1,724	22–22	

May (6–4)
Date	Opponent	Rank	Site/stadium	Score	Win	Loss	Save	TV	Attendance	Overall record	SLC Record
May 3	New Orleans		Pat Kenelly Diamond at Alumni Field • Hammond, LA	3–4	Delorbe, Ryan (3-1)	**Polk, Lakin (4-3)**	None	ESPN+	1,322	22–23	4–12
May 4	New Orleans		Pat Kenelly Diamond at Alumni Field • Hammond, LA	14–7	**Fabre, Larson (2-1)**	Seroski, Caleb (4-2)	Rodriguez, Jackson (5)	ESPN+	1,485	23–23	5–12
May 5	New Orleans		Pat Kenelly Diamond at Alumni Field • Hammond, LA	5–7	Olivier, Chris (1-1)	**Vosburg, Aiden (0-5)**	Delorbe, Ryan (1)	ESPN+	1,264	23–24	5–13
May 10	at Incarnate Word		Sullivan Field • San Antonio, TX	9–0	**Stuprich, Brennan (4-3)**	Salinas, Josh (5-2)	None	ESPN+	113	24–24	6–13
May 11	at Incarnate Word		Sullivan Field • San Antonio, TX	13–7	**Aspholm, Dalton (2-0)**	Zavala, Isaiah (4-4)	**Rodriguez, Jackson (6)**	ESPN+	136	25–24	7–13
May 12	at Incarnate Word		Sullivan Field • San Antonio, TX	12–11	**Polk, Lakin (5-3)**	Berens, Micah (1-3)	**Robb, Carson (1)**	ESPN+	153	26–24	8–13
May 14	South Alabama		Pat Kenelly Diamond at Alumni Field • Hammond, LA	1–13 (7 inn)	Zach Stevens (1-0)	**Kinzeler, Will (1-5)**	None	ESPN+	1,382	26–25	
May 16	Texas A&M–Corpus Christi		Pat Kenelly Diamond at Alumni Field • Hammond, LA	12–4	**Stuprich, Brennan (5-3)**	Dove, Kendall (1-5)	None	ESPN+	1,076	27–25	9–13
May 16	Texas A&M–Corpus Christi		Pat Kenelly Diamond at Alumni Field • Hammond, LA	9–8	**Fabre, Larson (3-1)**	Garcia, Zach (4-2)	**Rodriguez, Jackson (7)**	ESPN+	1,297	28–25	10–13
May 17	Texas A&M–Corpus Christi		Pat Kenelly Diamond at Alumni Field • Hammond, LA	8–9	Matthew Watson (-)	**Hayden Robb (3-3)**	None	ESPN+	1,260	28–26	10–14

Postseason ( 2–2 )

Southland Conference Tournament ( 2–2 )
Date	Opponent	(Seed)/Rank	Site/stadium	Score	Win	Loss	Save	TV	Attendance	Overall record	Tournament record
May 22	vs. (3) New Orleans	(6)	Pat Kenelly Diamond at Alumni Field; Hammond, LA	10–2	**Stuprich, Brennan (6-3)**	Delorbe, Ryan (3-2)	None	ESPN+	1,487	29–26	1–0
May 23	vs. (2) Nicholls	(6)	Pat Kenelly Diamond at Alumni Field; Hammond, LA	4–5	Saltaformaggio, Nico (7-4)	Polk, Lakin (5-4)	()	ESPN+	1,590	29–27	1–1
May 24	vs. (3) New Orleans	(6)	Pat Kenelly Diamond at Alumni Field; Hammond, LA	11–5	**Vosburg, Aiden(1-5)**	Edwards, Grant(5-5)	None	ESPN+		30–27	2–1
May 24	vs. (2) Nicholls	(6)	Pat Kenelly Diamond at Alumni Field; Hammond, LA	3–4	Rodriguez, Arturo(3-3)	**Lauve, Lance(1-1)**	None	ESPN+	2,232	30–28	2–2

Legend: = Win = Loss = Canceled
Bold = Lamar team member
Rankings are based on the team's current ranking in the D1Baseball poll.

Schedule source:

*Rankings are based on the team's current ranking in the D1Baseball poll. |}

== Conference awards and honors ==
=== Weekly awards ===
Weekly honors
Honors	Player	Position	Date Awarded	Ref.
SLC Baseball Hitter of the Week	Jude Hall	OF	March 4, 2024	
SLC Baseball Pitcher of the Week	Brennan Stuprich	RHP	March 4, 2024	

== See also ==
2024 Southeastern Louisiana Lady Lions softball team
