= Max Belyeu =

American baseball player (born 2003)

Colorado Rockies
- Outfielder
- Born: December 15, 2003 (age 22); Longview, Texas, U.S.
- Bats: Left Throws: Right

Max Ryan Belyeu (born December 15, 2003) is an American professional baseball outfielder in the Colorado Rockies organization.

== College career ==
Belyeu attended Conroe High School in Conroe, Texas his freshman and sophomore years before transferring to Aledo High School in Aledo, Texas for his junior and senior years. As a senior in 2022, he was named the 5-5A Offensive MVP. Belyeu committed to the University of Texas at Austin to play college baseball.

As a freshman at Texas in 2023, Belyeu played in 15 games with four starts and hit .300/.333/.350 with two runs batted in (RBI) over 20 at-bats. As a sophomore in 2024, he was named the Big 12 Conference Baseball Player of the Year after hitting .329/.423/.667 with 18 home runs and 53 RBI over 210 at bats in 59 games. After the season, he played for the Cotuit Kettleers in the Cape Cod League. Belyeu returned to Texas for his junior year in 2025. He missed time during the season after undergoing thumb surgery, but still appeared in 32 games in which he hit .303 with nine home runs and 29 RBIs.

== Professional career ==
Belyeu was selected 74th overall in Competitive Balance Round B of the 2025 MLB draft by the Colorado Rockies. He signed with the team for a $1.1 million signing bonus. Belyeu made his professional debut with the High-A Spokane Indians, hitting .150 with four home runs and nine RBI across 21 games.
