= Husky Field (Houston Christian Baseball) =

Baseball venue in Houston, Texas, US

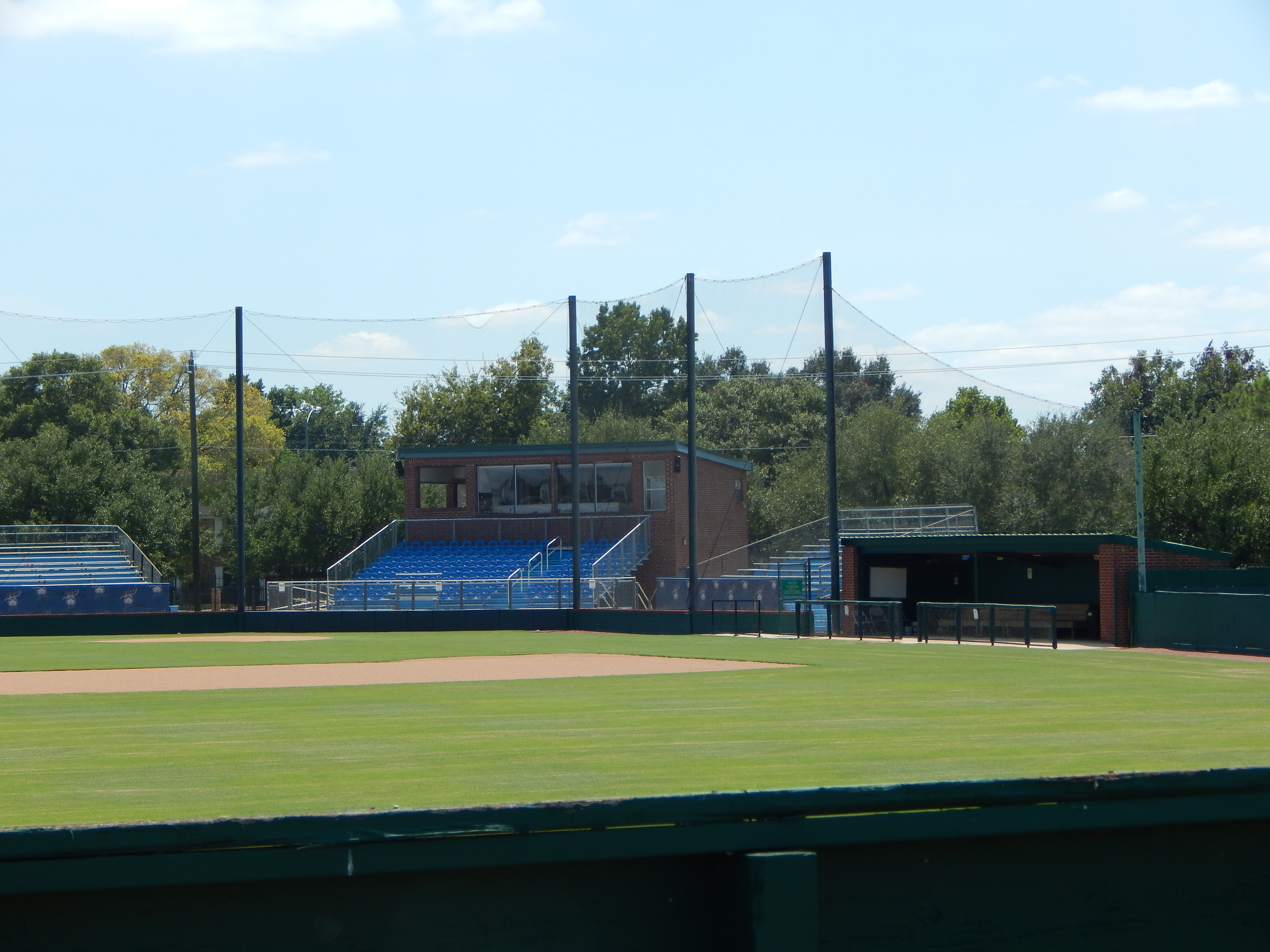
- Interactive map of Husky Field
- Full name: Husky Field
- Location: Beechnut Street and Bonhomme Road, Houston, Texas, US
- Coordinates: 29°41′30.9″N 95°30′47.8″W
- Owner: Houston Christian University
- Operator: Houston Christian University
- Capacity: 500
- Surface: Natural grass
- Scoreboard: Electronic
- Record attendance: 563 (May 23, 2025 vs. New Orleans)
- Field size: 330 ft. (LF); 380 ft. (LCF); 400 ft. (CF); 380 ft. (RCF); 330 ft. (RF)

Construction
- Opened: 1993

Tenant
- Houston Christian Huskies baseball (NCAA DI Southland) (1993–present)

Husky Field is a baseball venue on the campus of Houston Christian University (Note: Known as Houston Baptist College from 1960–1973 and Houston Baptist University from 1973–2022.) in Houston, Texas, United States. It is home to the Houston Christian Huskies baseball team of the NCAA Division I Southland Conference. Opened in 1993, it has a capacity of 500 spectators. The facility features a press box, natural grass surface, a covered warm-up area connected to the home bullpen, and a 7,200 square-foot indoor facility located down the right field line. Lights were added around the perimeter of the field in late-2024, allowing for night games to be played beginning in 2025. The first home night game in ballpark history took place on February 14, 2025 against Central Michigan. Husky Field hosted the 2008 Red River Athletic Conference Baseball Tournament and the 2007 NAIA Region IV Tournament. The facility also hosted the best-of-three championship round of the 2025 Southland Conference baseball tournament.

== First night game ==
The Huskies played their first ever night game on campus during the second game of a doubleheader against Central Michigan on February 14, 2025. After getting shutout 6–0 in game one, Houston Christian began the nightcap of their doubleheader during the evening at 5:30 pm. The Huskies' bats woke up with a four-run bottom 1st all with two outs, and a fifth run was added in the bottom 2nd. Nighttime fell by the third inning. HCU pitching held the visiting Chippewas to four hits in the seven-inning nightstand, lifting the Huskies to a 5–0 victory to split the doubleheader. 389 spectators were in attendance for the historic game.

== Gallery ==
Views around the stadium
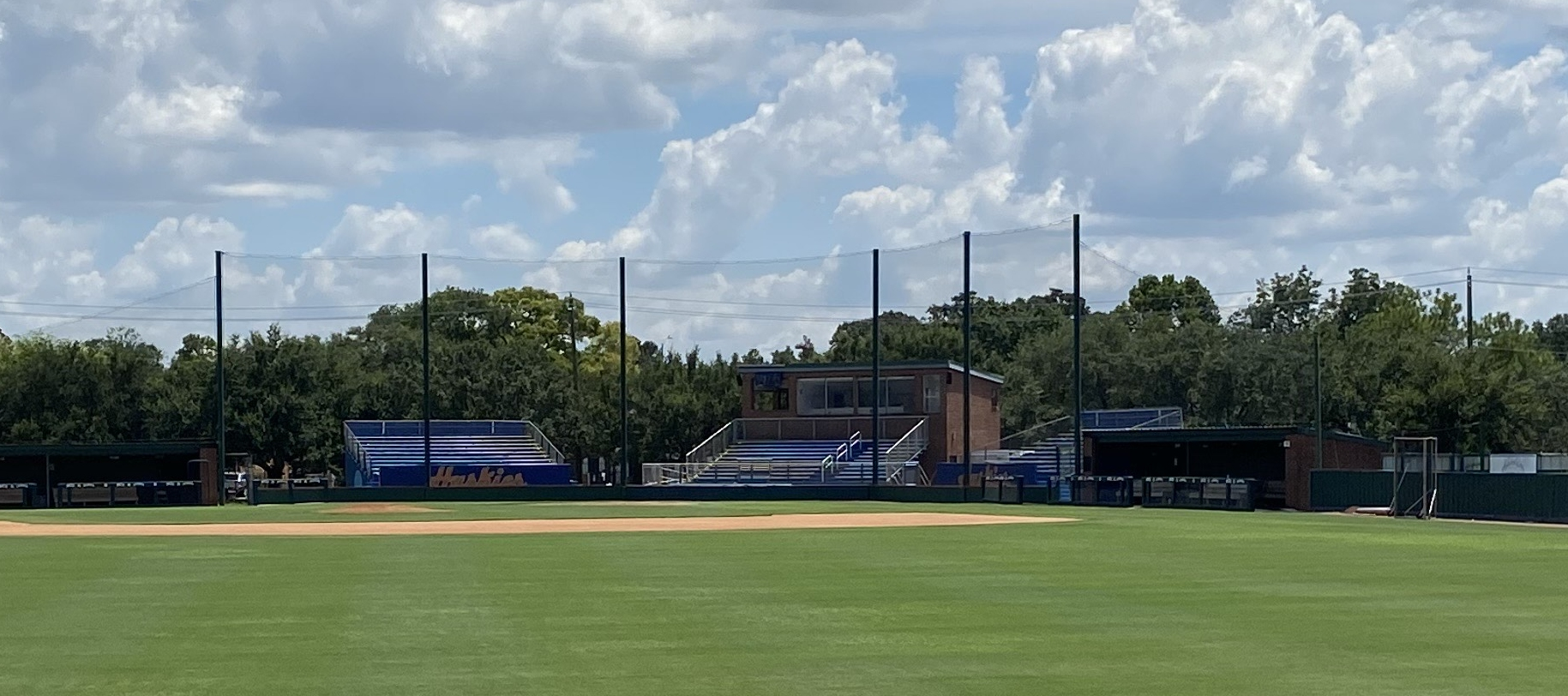
Husky Field Grandstands 2025

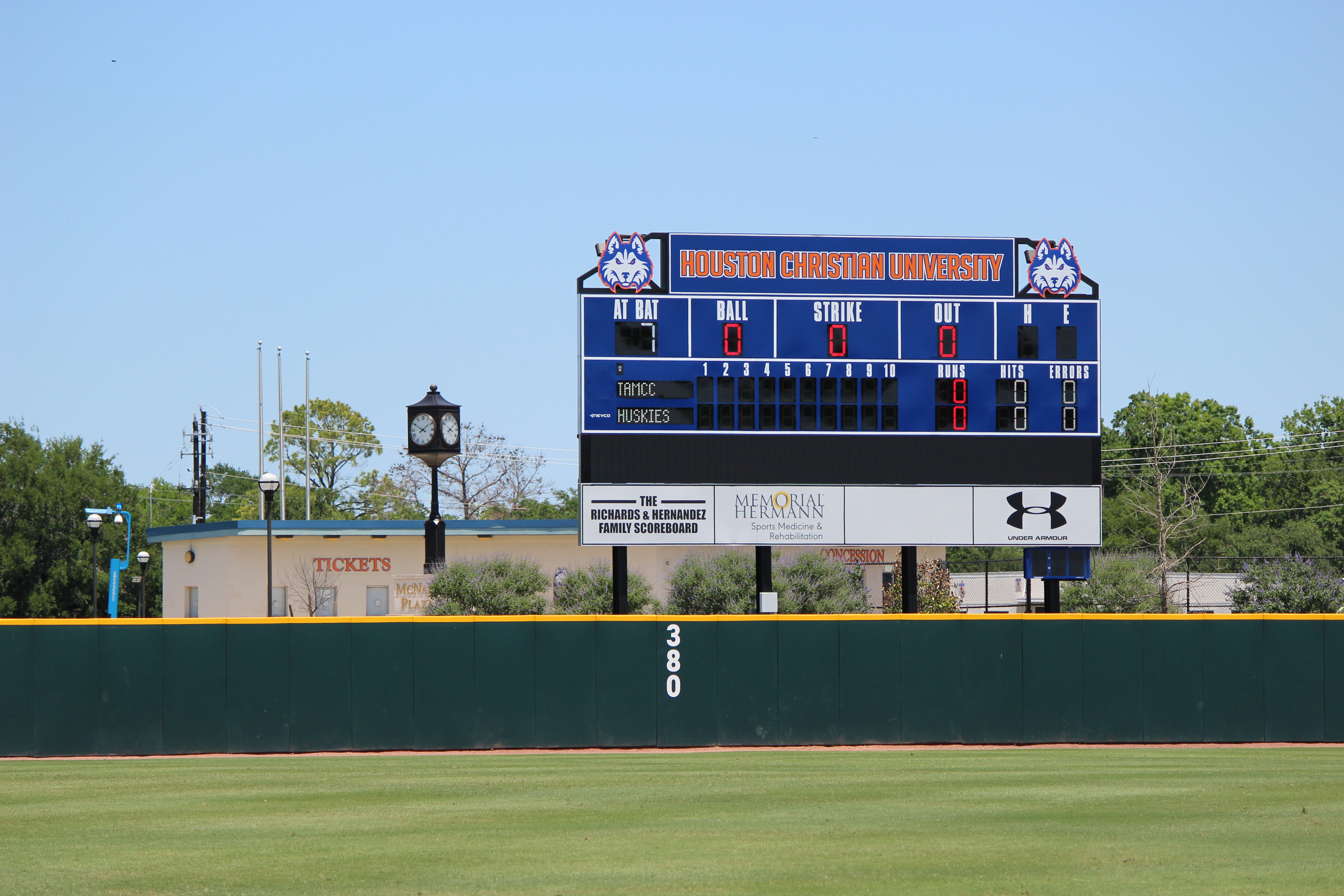
Husky Field Scoreboard- New in 2025

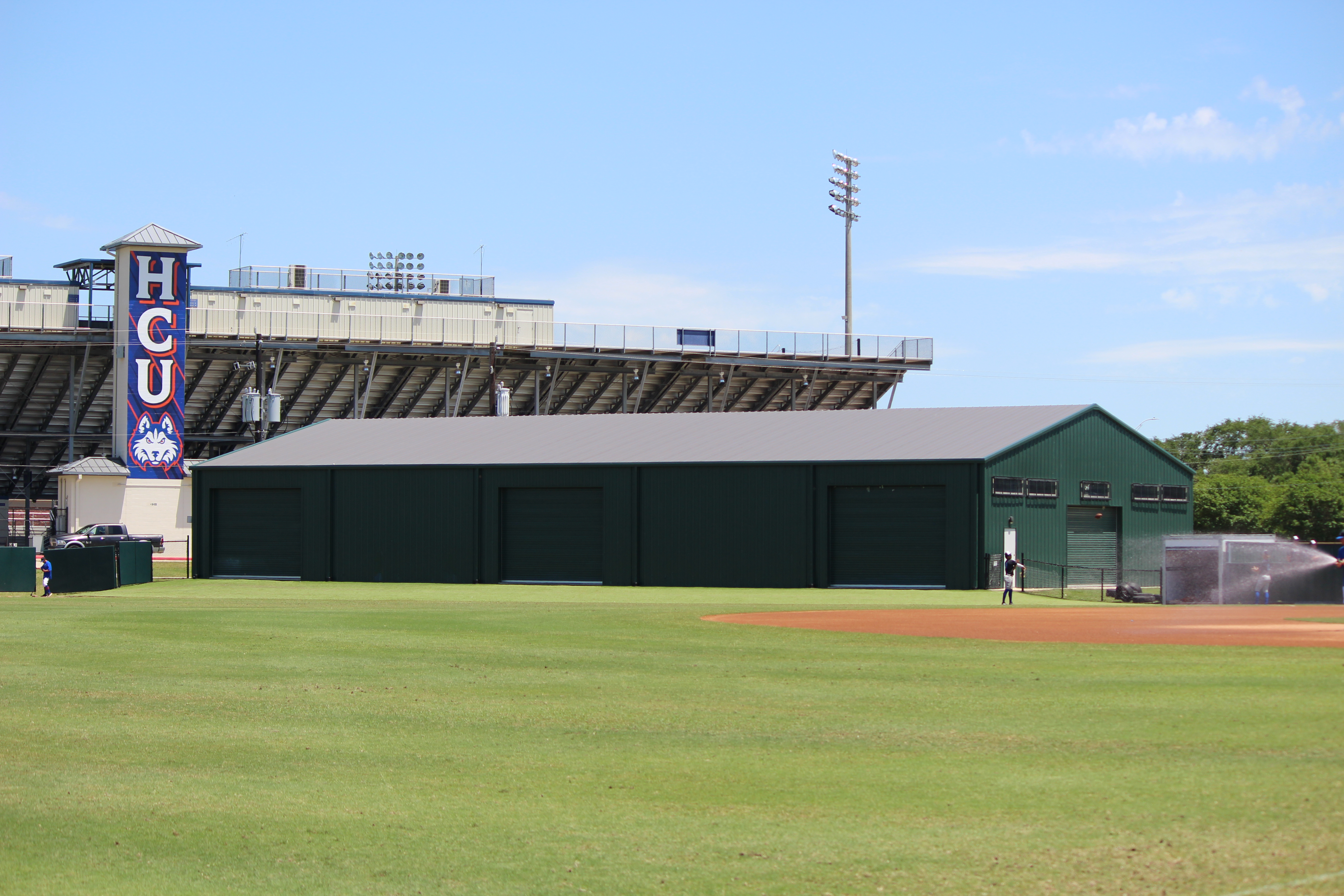
Husky Field Indoor Baseball Facility

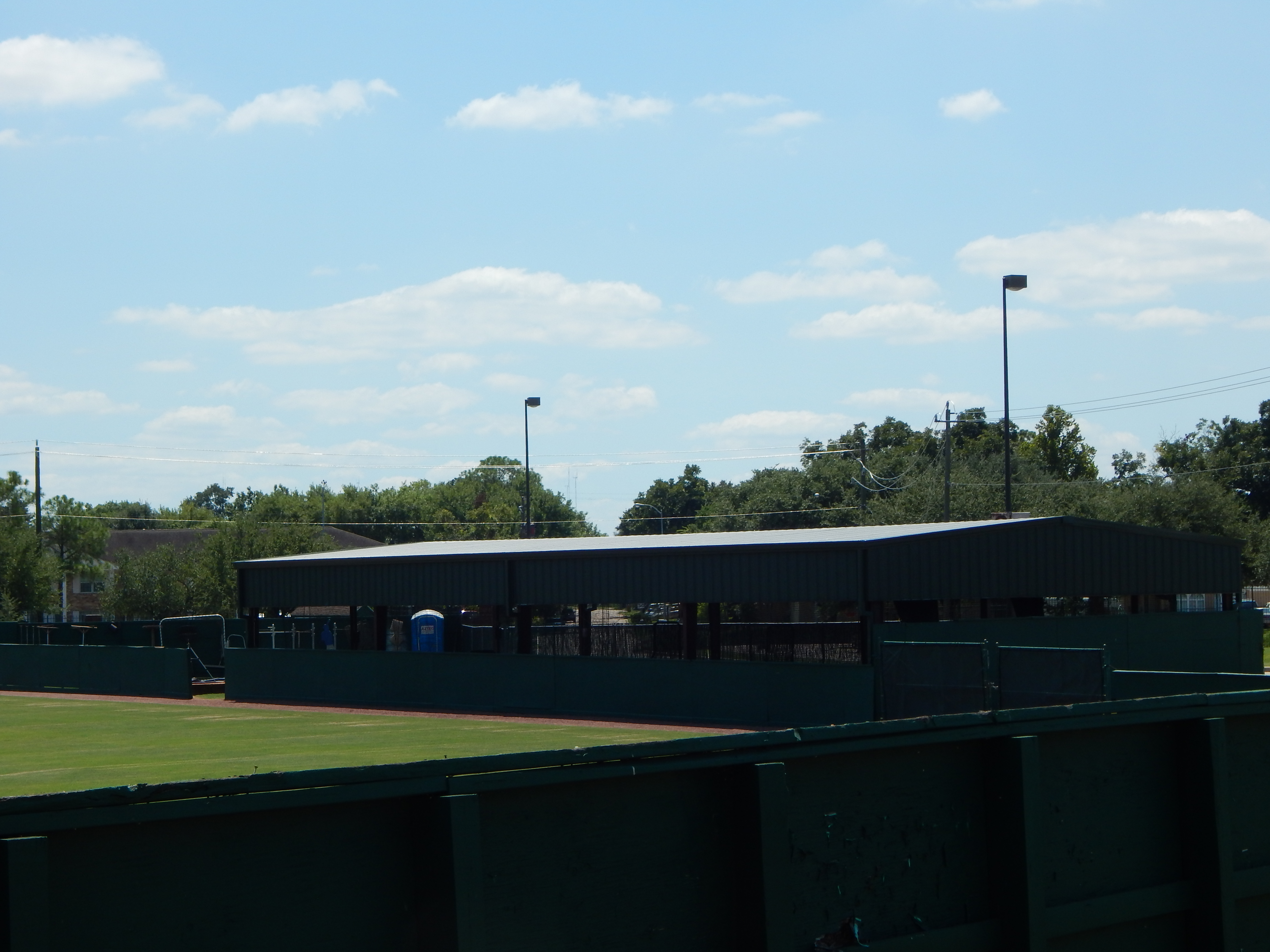
Covered Bullpen Warmup Area

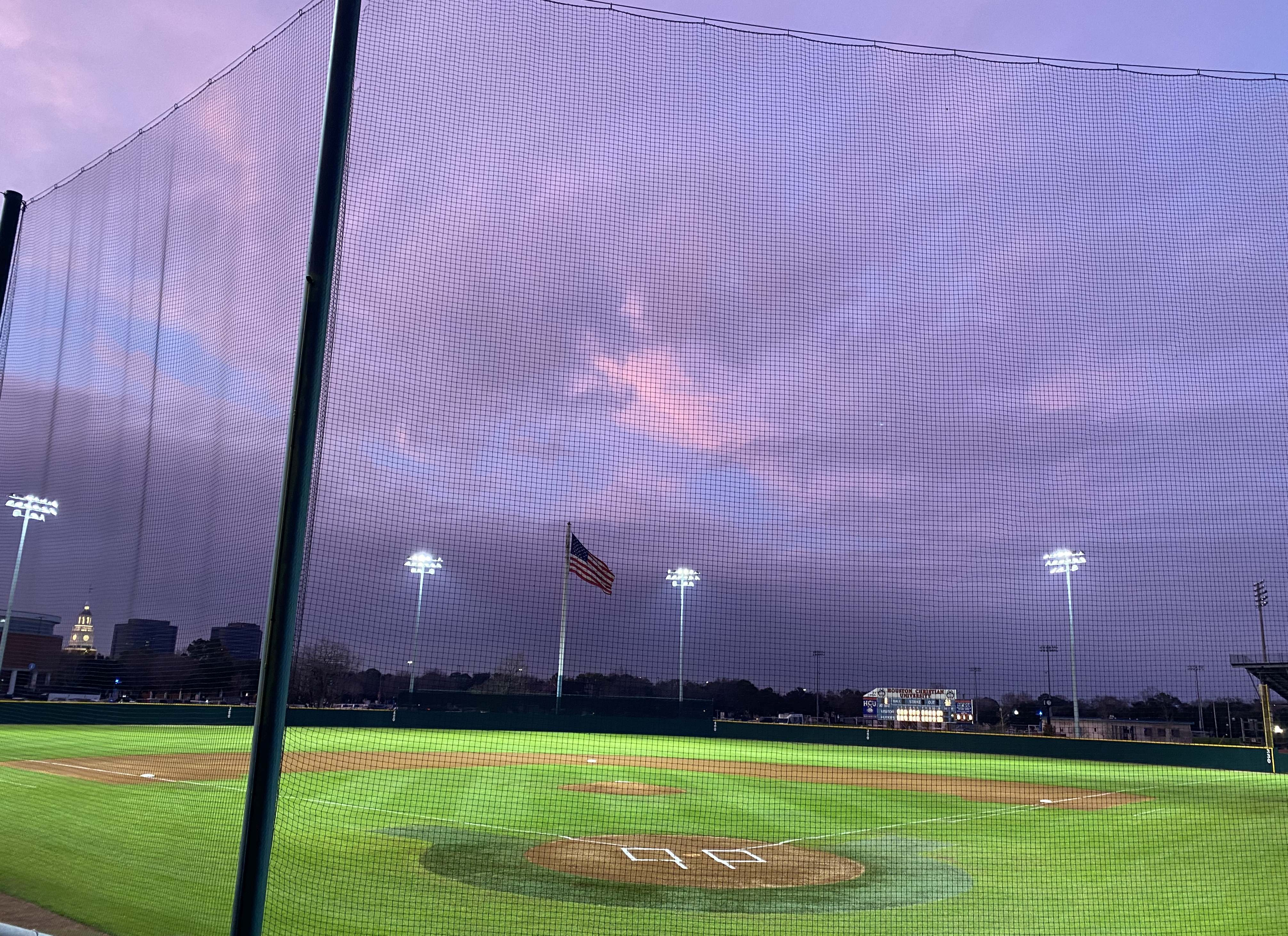
Husky Field First Night Game - Feb. 14, 2025

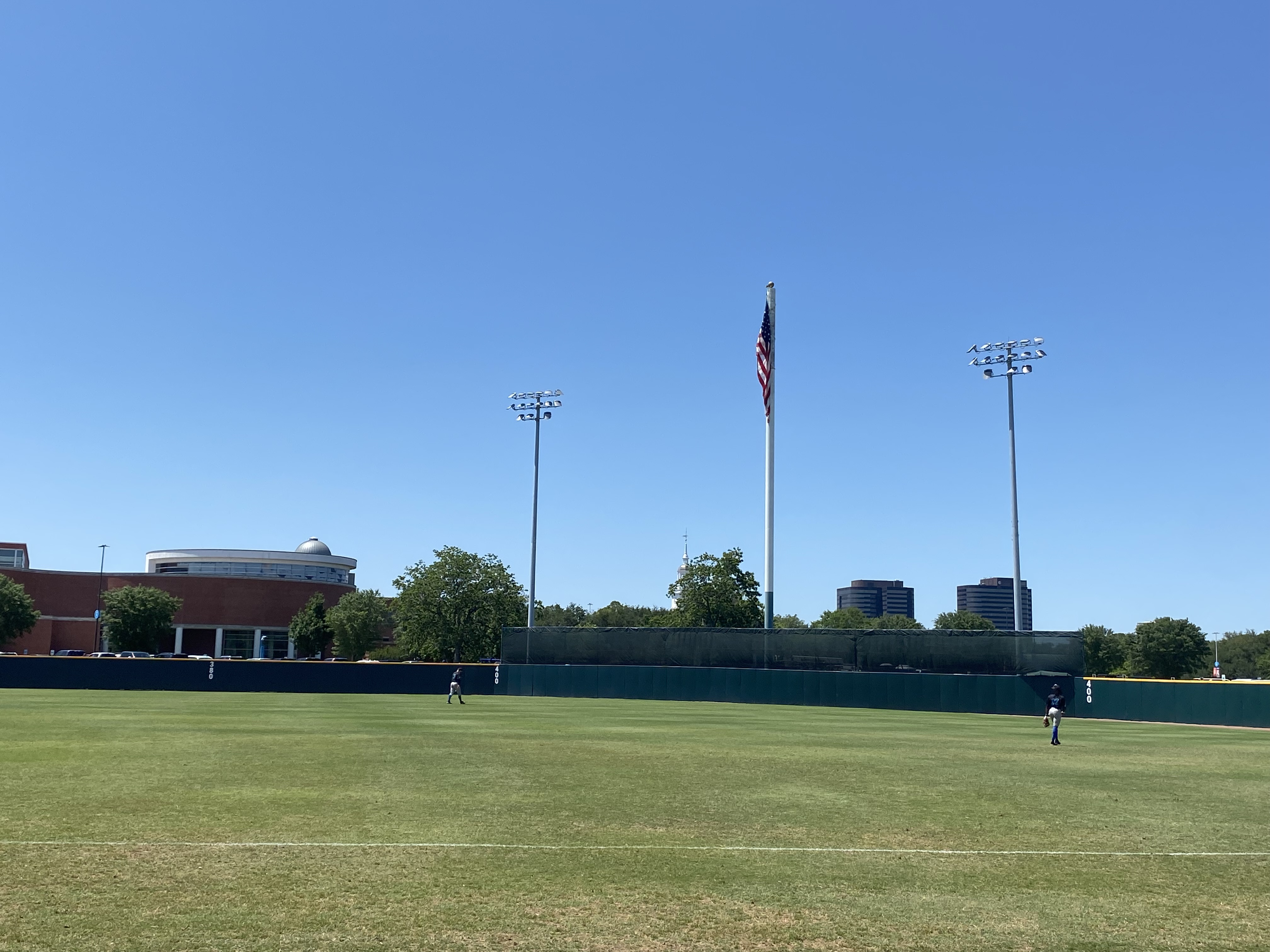
Husky Field - Field View - 2025

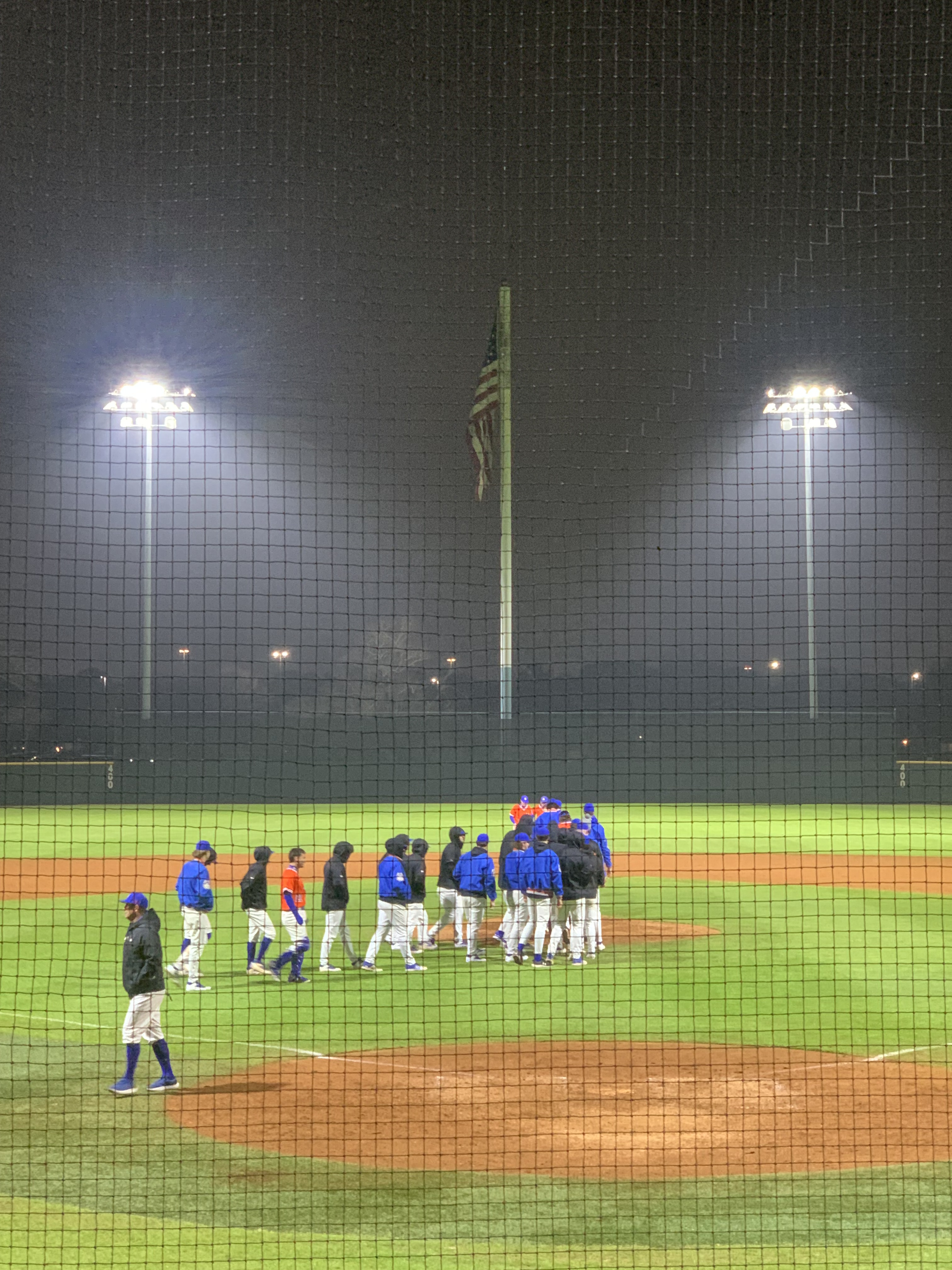
Huskies baseball celebrating their victory after the program's first night home game.

== See also ==
- List of NCAA Division I baseball venues
