= Bedlam Series =

American college sports rivalry

- Oklahoma Sooners Oklahoma State Cowboys
- First meeting: 1900 (track and field); 1904 (football)

Locations of Oklahoma and Oklahoma State

The Bedlam Series is the name given to the Oklahoma–Oklahoma State rivalry. It refers to the athletics rivalry between the Oklahoma State University Cowboys and Cowgirls of the Big 12 Conference and the University of Oklahoma Sooners of the Southeastern Conference (SEC). Both schools were also members of the Big Eight Conference before the formation of the Big 12 Conference in 1996, and both were divisional rivals in the Big 12 South Division prior to 2011. Since Bedlam began in 1900, 40 years of the rivalry's games were played without the teams playing in the same conference. The rivalry concluded as an annual conference matchup for football following the 2023–24 NCAA Division I FBS season, after which Oklahoma joined the SEC; while scheduling issues preclude the resumption of the Bedlam Series for football until the 2031 season, the Series will continue for basketball as a non-conference game for the 2024–25 season.

The Bedlam Series is, like most other intrastate rivalries, a rivalry that goes beyond one or two sports. Both schools also have rivalries with other schools, though most of those rivalries are limited to one or two sports at the most.

While the football and basketball games stand today as the marquee events in the Bedlam Series, the term "Bedlam" actually began with the rivalry between the schools' prestigious wrestling programs, more particularly the raucous crowds that attended the matches held at Oklahoma State's Gallagher-Iba Arena.

== Football ==
Football series
- Oklahoma Sooners Oklahoma State Cowboys
- First meeting: November 6, 1904; Oklahoma 75, Oklahoma A&M 0
- Latest meeting: November 4, 2023; Oklahoma State 27, Oklahoma 24
- Next meeting: TBD (Presumably 2031)
- Trophy: Bedlam Bell

Statistics
- Total meetings: 118
- All-time series: Oklahoma leads: 91–20–7
- Largest victory: Oklahoma: 75–0 (1904); Oklahoma State: 47–0 (1945)
- Longest win streak: Oklahoma: 19 (1946–1964)
- Current win streak: Oklahoma State: 1 (2023–present)

The first Bedlam football game was held at Island Park, now known as Mineral Wells Park, in Guthrie, Oklahoma. It was a cold and extremely windy day, with temperatures well below the freezing mark. At one point during the game when the Oklahoma A&M Aggies were punting, the wind carried the ball backwards behind the kicker. If the Oklahoma A&M squad recovered the ball it would be a touchback, but if the University of Oklahoma squad recovered it, it would be a touchdown. The ball rolled down a hill into the half-frozen creek. Since a touchdown was at stake, members of both teams dove into the icy waters to recover the ball. A member of the OU team came out with the ball and downed it for a touchdown. OU won the game, 75–0. The rivalry was played without interruption from 1910 through 2023, and alternated between the two respective campuses. Since 2011, games in odd-numbered years were contested in Stillwater, Oklahoma, on the campus of OSU, and games in even-numbered years in Norman, Oklahoma at OU.

In 2007, author Steve Budin, whose father was a New York bookie, publicized a claim that the 1954 Bedlam Game was fixed by mobsters in his book Bets, Drugs, and Rock & Roll (ISBN 1-60239-099-1). Allegedly, the mobsters threatened and paid off a cook to slip laxatives into a soup consumed by many OU Sooner starting players, causing them to fall violently ill in the days leading up to the game. OU was victorious in the end, but the 14–0 win did not cover the 20-point spread in OU's favor. However, many people involved in the 1954 contest do not recall any incident like the one purported by Budin to have occurred. Nor do any pregame and postgame newspaper articles mention any such condition. One possible reason for the Sooners' lackluster performance, according to one coach, was that the players were "beat up" from the previous game against Nebraska.

With its victory in 2023, Oklahoma State holds the Bedlam Bell and will continue to do so through at least 2031.

=== Game results ===
Oklahoma victories	Oklahoma State victories	Tie games

No.	Date	Location	Winner	Score
1	November 5, 1904	Guthrie	Oklahoma	75–0
2	October 12, 1906	Stillwater	Oklahoma	23–0
3	November 9, 1907	Norman	Oklahoma	67–0
4	October 3, 1908	Stillwater	Oklahoma	18–0
5	October 21, 1910	Norman	Oklahoma	12–0
6	October 20, 1911	Stillwater	Oklahoma	22–0
7	November 16, 1912	Norman	Oklahoma	16–0
8	November 21, 1913	Stillwater	Oklahoma	7–0
9	November 6, 1914	Norman	Oklahoma	28–6
10	November 25, 1915	Oklahoma City	Oklahoma	26–7
11	November 30, 1916	Oklahoma City	Oklahoma	41–7
12	November 29, 1917	Oklahoma City	Oklahoma A&M	9–0
13	November 28, 1918	Oklahoma City	Oklahoma	27–0
14	November 27, 1919	Oklahoma City	Oklahoma	33–6
15	November 13, 1920	Stillwater	Oklahoma	36–0
16	October 15, 1921	Norman	Oklahoma	6–0
17	November 25, 1922	Stillwater	Tie	3–3
18	October 27, 1923	Norman	Oklahoma	12–0
19	November 1, 1924	Stillwater	Oklahoma A&M	6–0
20	November 26, 1925	Norman	Oklahoma	35–0
21	November 25, 1926	Stillwater	Tie	14–14
22	November 19, 1927	Norman	Oklahoma A&M	13–7
23	November 24, 1928	Stillwater	Oklahoma	46–0
24	November 23, 1929	Norman	Tie	7–7
25	November 22, 1930	Stillwater	Oklahoma A&M	7–0
26	November 26, 1931	Norman	Tie	0–0
27	October 29, 1932	Stillwater	Oklahoma A&M	7–0
28	November 23, 1933	Norman	Oklahoma A&M	13–0
29	November 22, 1934	Stillwater	Tie	0–0
30	November 28, 1935	Norman	Oklahoma	25–0
31	November 26, 1936	Stillwater	Oklahoma	35–13
32	November 20, 1937	Norman	Oklahoma	16–0
33	November 26, 1938	Stillwater	#6 Oklahoma	19–0
34	October 28, 1939	Norman	#6 Oklahoma	41–0
35	October 5, 1940	Norman	Oklahoma	29–27
36	September 27, 1941	Norman	Oklahoma	19–0
37	September 26, 1942	Stillwater	Tie	0–0
38	October 2, 1943	Oklahoma City	Oklahoma	22–13
39	November 25, 1944	Oklahoma City	Oklahoma A&M	28–6
40	November 24, 1945	Norman	#6 Oklahoma A&M	47–0
41	November 30, 1946	Stillwater	#17 Oklahoma	73–12
42	November 29, 1947	Norman	#20 Oklahoma	21–13
43	November 27, 1948	Stillwater	#6 Oklahoma	19–15
44	November 26, 1949	Norman	#3 Oklahoma	41–0
45	December 2, 1950	Stillwater	#1 Oklahoma	41–14
46	December 1, 1951	Norman	#10 Oklahoma	41–6
47	November 29, 1952	Stillwater	#4 Oklahoma	54–7
48	November 28, 1953	Norman	#4 Oklahoma	42–7
49	November 27, 1954	Stillwater	#3 Oklahoma	14–0
50	November 26, 1955	Norman	#1 Oklahoma	53–0
51	December 1, 1956	Stillwater	#1 Oklahoma	53–0
52	November 30, 1957	Norman	#5 Oklahoma	53–6
53	November 29, 1958	Stillwater	#3 Oklahoma	7–0
54	November 28, 1959	Norman	#17 Oklahoma	17–7
55	November 26, 1960	Stillwater	Oklahoma	17–6
56	December 2, 1961	Norman	Oklahoma	21–13
57	December 1, 1962	Stillwater	#8 Oklahoma	37–6
58	November 30, 1963	Norman	#10 Oklahoma	34–10
59	November 28, 1964	Stillwater	Oklahoma	21–16
60	December 4, 1965	Norman	Oklahoma State	17–16

No.	Date	Location	Winner	Score
61	December 3, 1966	Stillwater	Oklahoma State	15–14
62	December 2, 1967	Norman	#3 Oklahoma	38–14
63	November 30, 1968	Stillwater	#11 Oklahoma	41–7
64	November 29, 1969	Stillwater	Oklahoma	28–27
65	November 28, 1970	Norman	Oklahoma	66–6
66	December 4, 1971	Stillwater	#3 Oklahoma	58–14
67	December 2, 1972	Norman	#3 Oklahoma	38–15
68	December 1, 1973	Stillwater	#2 Oklahoma	45–18
69	November 30, 1974	Norman	#1 Oklahoma	44–13
70	November 1, 1975	Stillwater	#2 Oklahoma	27–7
71	October 23, 1976	Norman	Oklahoma State	31–24
72	November 5, 1977	Stillwater	#3 Oklahoma	61–28
73	November 18, 1978	Norman	#4 Oklahoma	62–7
74	November 3, 1979	Stillwater	#7 Oklahoma	38–7
75	November 29, 1980	Norman	#6 Oklahoma	63–14
76	November 28, 1981	Stillwater	Oklahoma	27–3
77	October 23, 1982	Norman	#20 Oklahoma	27–9
78	October 15, 1983	Stillwater	#15 Oklahoma	21–20
79	November 24, 1984	Norman	#2 Oklahoma	24–14
80	November 30, 1985	Stillwater	#3 Oklahoma	13–0
81	October 18, 1986	Norman	#5 Oklahoma	19–0
82	November 7, 1987	Norman	#1 Oklahoma	29–10
83	November 5, 1988	Stillwater	#8 Oklahoma	31–28
84	October 7, 1989	Norman	#16 Oklahoma	37–15
85	October 6, 1990	Stillwater	#7 Oklahoma	31–17
86	November 16, 1991	Norman	#18 Oklahoma	21–6
87	November 14, 1992	Stillwater	Tie	15–15
88	November 13, 1993	Norman	#17 Oklahoma	31–0
89	November 13, 1994	Stillwater	Oklahoma	33–14
90	November 11, 1995	Norman	Oklahoma State	12–0
91	November 9, 1996	Stillwater	Oklahoma	27–17
92	November 8, 1997	Norman	#25 Oklahoma State	30–7
93	October 24, 1998	Stillwater	Oklahoma State	41–26
94	November 27, 1999	Norman	Oklahoma	44–7
95	November 25, 2000	Stillwater	#1 Oklahoma	12–7
96	November 24, 2001	Norman	Oklahoma State	16–13
97	November 30, 2002	Stillwater	Oklahoma State	38–28
98	November 1, 2003	Norman	#1 Oklahoma	52–9
99	October 30, 2004	Stillwater	#2 Oklahoma	38–35
100	November 26, 2005	Norman	Oklahoma	42–14
101	November 25, 2006	Stillwater	#13 Oklahoma	27–21
102	November 24, 2007	Norman	#10 Oklahoma	49–17
103	November 29, 2008	Stillwater	#3 Oklahoma	61–41
104	November 28, 2009	Norman	Oklahoma	27–0
105	November 27, 2010	Stillwater	#14 Oklahoma	47–41
106	December 3, 2011	Stillwater	#3 Oklahoma State	44–10
107	November 24, 2012	Norman	#13 Oklahoma	51–48 ^{OT}
108	December 7, 2013	Stillwater	#17 Oklahoma	33–24
109	December 6, 2014	Norman	Oklahoma State	38–35 ^{OT}
110	November 28, 2015	Stillwater	#3 Oklahoma	58–23
111	December 3, 2016	Norman	#5 Oklahoma	38–20
112	November 4, 2017	Stillwater	#5 Oklahoma	62–52
113	November 10, 2018	Norman	#6 Oklahoma	48–47
114	November 30, 2019	Stillwater	#7 Oklahoma	34–16
115	November 21, 2020	Norman	#18 Oklahoma	41–13
116	November 27, 2021	Stillwater	#7 Oklahoma State	37–33
117	November 19, 2022	Norman	Oklahoma	28–13
118	November 4, 2023	Stillwater	#22 Oklahoma State	27–24
Series: Oklahoma leads 91–20–7

== Men's basketball ==
Started in 1916, Oklahoma leads the all-time series in men's basketball with a record of 136–106 as of 2025. The Sooners have won 21 of the last 38 meetings. However, the Cowboys have gone 11–7 against the Sooners since the end of Travis Ford's tenure as head coach. The Sooners swept the Cowboys in 2018–2019, giving Oklahoma its seventh Bedlam sweep since 2006, including the 2013–2014, 2014–2015 and 2015–2016 regular season Bedlam series. Oklahoma State has swept three times in that span, during the 2016–2017, 2020–2021 and 2022–2023 regular seasons. The two teams met seven times in the Big 12 tournament, where the Cowboys have gone 6–1 against the Sooners. The Sooners have swept the Cowboys most recently in the 2024 season in both meetings, with the most recent being by a buzzer beater three-pointer. After Oklahoma left the Big 12 to become an SEC member starting with the 2024–25 collegiate athletic season, in September 2024, the Sooners and Cowboys announced an agreement to continue the series as a non-conference matchup starting that year, beginning with a neutral venue game held in December 2024 at the Paycom Center in Oklahoma City.

== Wrestling ==
Oklahoma State holds a lopsided advantage in the schools' wrestling rivalry, the original "Bedlam Series." Wrestling Bedlam began in 1920. Football Bedlam began in 1904. The Cowboys wrestling program currently holds a 153–27–10 record against the Sooners, which is all the more remarkable considering that both schools have long been national powers in wrestling. Oklahoma has won seven team national championships in its history, while Oklahoma State's wrestling program has a record thirty-four team national titles. Oklahoma State has earned 145 individual NCAA titles and 492 All-American honors compared to Oklahoma's 67 individual championships and 278 All-Americans.

Oklahoma will continue to wrestle in the Big 12 even after all its other sports join the SEC. The SEC has not sponsored wrestling since the early 1980s; the only other SEC member with a wrestling program is former Big 8/Big 12 rival Missouri, which returned to the Big 12 for the sport in 2021.

== Baseball ==
Oklahoma State holds the all time Bedlam record in baseball 189–160. The first meeting of the two teams was in 1935 which resulted in a 9–6 win for OU. OSU did not win their first game in baseball against OU until 1937. In the final Big 12 conference baseball game between the two schools, Oklahoma State defeated Oklahoma 9–3 to win the 2024 Big 12 tournament.

== See also ==
- List of NCAA college football rivalry games
- List of most-played college football series in NCAA Division I
