= 2024 BYU Cougars baseball team =

American college baseball season

2024 BYU Cougars baseball
- Conference: Big 12 Conference
- Record: 11–9 (4–4 Big 12 Conference)
- Head coach: Trent Pratt (2nd full, 3rd overall season)
- Assistant coaches: Abe Alvarez (2nd season); Tyler Coolbaugh (1st season); Adam Law (1st season)
- Home stadium: Larry H. Miller Field

2024 Big 12 Conference baseball standings
| | Conf. | | | | Overall |
| Team | W | | L | PCT | W | | L | PCT |
|---|---|---|---|---|---|---|---|---|
| No. 18 Oklahoma ‍†‍‍^{y} | 23 | – | 7 | .767 | 40 | – | 21 | .656 |
| No. 21 Oklahoma State ‍‍‡‍^{y} | 19 | – | 9 | .679 | 42 | – | 19 | .689 |
| Texas ‍‍‍^{y} | 20 | – | 10 | .667 | 36 | – | 24 | .600 |
| No. 13 West Virginia ‍‍‍^{y} | 19 | – | 11 | .633 | 36 | – | 24 | .600 |
| Cincinnati ‍‍‍ | 17 | – | 13 | .567 | 32 | – | 25 | .561 |
| No. 14 Kansas State ‍‍‍^{y} | 15 | – | 15 | .500 | 35 | – | 26 | .574 |
| Kansas ‍‍‍ | 15 | – | 15 | .500 | 31 | – | 23 | .574 |
| UCF ‍‍‍^{y} | 14 | – | 15 | .483 | 37 | – | 21 | .638 |
| TCU ‍‍‍ | 14 | – | 16 | .467 | 33 | – | 21 | .611 |
| Texas Tech ‍‍‍ | 12 | – | 17 | .414 | 33 | – | 26 | .559 |
| Baylor ‍‍‍ | 10 | – | 20 | .333 | 22 | – | 31 | .415 |
| Houston ‍‍‍ | 7 | – | 21 | .250 | 26 | – | 28 | .481 |
| BYU ‍‍‍ | 7 | – | 23 | .233 | 21 | – | 31 | .404 |
† – Conference champion ‡ – Tournament champion y – Invited to the NCAA tournament As of June 26, 2024; Rankings from D1baseball

The 2024 BYU Cougars baseball team represented Brigham Young University during the 2024 NCAA Division I baseball season. Trent Pratt continued as the new head coach of the BYU Cougars baseball team after taking over the interim duties in 2022.

The Cougars were competing as members of the Big 12 Conference for 2024, their first in the conference. The Cougars were picked to finish 12th in 2024.

== 2024 roster ==
2024 BYU Cougars roster
| Pitchers: 3 Boston Mabeus – Junior; 8 Cutter Clawson – Sophomore; 9 Payton Gubler – (redshirt) Sophomore; 16 Mason Olson – Senior; 19 Bryce Robison – Senior; 22 Brett Hansen – (redshirt) Junior; 23 Stone Cushing – Junior; 25 Luke Sterner – Sophomore; 28 Justis Reiser – (redshirt) Sophomore; 29 Jake Porter – Junior; 30 Jackson Hollingshaus – (redshirt) Freshman; 31 Candon Dahle – Junior; 35 Matt Fox – Freshman; 36 Carter Foss – Junior; 37 Ben Hansen – Sophomore; 40 Hayden Coon – Junior; 43 Max Stanley – Freshman; 44 Cayson Bell – Freshman; 49 Austin Laycock – Freshman; 53 Maddax Peck – Freshman | Infielders: 2 Brock Watkins – Junior; 5 Crew Robinson – Senior; 7 Cooper Vest – (redshirt) Junior; 14 Bitner Workman – Sophomore; 17 Easton Jones – Sophomore; 21 Chipper Beck – Sophomore; 24 Braeden Mondeau – Junior; 34 Greyson Shafer – Junior | Catchers: 10 Parker Goff – Sophomore; 18 Collin Reuter – (redshirt) Sophomore; 27 Gavin Taylor – Freshman; 39 Bryant Ball – Sophomore; Outfielders: 4 Tate Gambill – Senior; 11 Luke Anderson – Sophomore; 13 Bryker Hurdsman – Sophomore; 26 Keoni Painter – (redshirt) Freshman; 30 Jackson Hollingshaus – (redshirt) Freshman; 45 Ryker Schow – Freshman; 50 Crew McChesney – Freshman; 51 Walker Sanders – Freshman; 55 Seth Rajacich – Freshman; Designated Hitter: 33 Kuhio Aloy – Freshman |

== Schedule ==
2024 BYU Cougars game log
Regular season
February

| Date | Opponent | Rank | Site/stadium | Television | Score | Win | Loss | Save | Attendance | Overall record | Big 12 record |
|---|---|---|---|---|---|---|---|---|---|---|---|
| February 16 | vs. USC | – | Sloan Park | MLB.TV | 8–1 | Ben Hansen (1–0) | Caden Aoki (0–1) | None | 575 | 1–0 | – |
| February 17 | vs. Ohio State | – | Sloan Park | MLB.TV | 2–7 | Colin Purcell (1–0) | Cutter Clawson (0–1) | Hunter Shaw (1) | 590 | 1–1 | – |
| February 19 | vs. Grand Canyon | – | Sloan Park | MLB.TV | 2–6 | Isaac Lyon (1–0) | Maddax Peck (0–1) | Shawn Triplett (1) | 1,015 | 1–2 | – |
| February 21 | at Cal | – | Evans Diamond at Stu Gordon Stadium | Pac-12+ California | 0–8 | Quinn Larson (1–0) | Bryce Robinson (0–1) | None | 242 | 1–3 | – |
| February 22 | at UC Davis | – | Phil Swimley Field at Dobbins Stadium | | 20–4 | Ben Hansen (2–0) | Ian Torpey (0–1) | None | 258 | 2–3 | – |
| February 23 | at UC Davis | – | Phil Swimley Field at Dobbins Stadium | ESPN+ | 2–6 | Tyler Wood (1–0) | Cutter Clawson (0–2) | None | 239 | 2–4 | – |
| February 24 | at UC Davis | – | Phil Swimley Field at Dobbins Stadium | | 5–9 | Noel Valdez (1–0) | Candon Dahle (0–1) | None | 378 | 2–5 | – |
| February 29 | Gonzaga | – | Larry H. Miller Field | ESPN+ | 3–2 | Mason Olson (1–0) | Michael Cunneely (0–1) | Stone Cushing (1) | 1,315 | 3–5 | – |

March

| Date | Opponent | Rank | Site/stadium | Television | Score | Win | Loss | Save | Attendance | Overall record | Big 12 record |
|---|---|---|---|---|---|---|---|---|---|---|---|
| March 1 | Gonzaga | – | Larry H. Miller Field | ESPN+ | 11–2 | Bryce Robinson (1–1) | Justin Feld (0–1) | None | 400 | 4–5 | – |
| March 1 | Gonzaga | – | Larry H. Miller Field | ESPN+ | 6–4 | Candon Dahle (1–1) | Payton Graham (1–1) | Stone Cushing (2) | 1,652 | 5–5 | – |
| March 5 | at UNLV | – | Earl E. Wilson Stadium | Mountain West Net | 6–4 | Hayden Coon (1–0) | Blaze Hill (0–1) | Stone Cushing (3) | 238 | 6–5 | – |
| March 7 | at West Virginia* | – | Wagener Field at Monongalia County Ballpark | ESPN+ | 4–10 | Aidan Major (3–0) | Ben Hansen (2–1) | None | 1,767 | 6–6 | 0–1 |
| March 8 | at West Virginia* | – | Wagener Field at Monongalia County Ballpark | ESPN+ | 4–1 | Bryce Robinson (2–1) | David Hagaman (0–2) | Mason Olson (1) | 2,111 | 7–6 | 1–1 |
| March 8 | at West Virginia* | – | Wagener Field at Monongalia County Ballpark | ESPN+ | 0–2 | Derek Clark (1–0) | Cutter Clawson (0–3) | Hambleton Oliver (1) | 2,111 | 7–7 | 1–2 |
| March 12 | at Utah | – | Smith's Ballpark | P12 | PPD- Snowstorm | | | | | | |
| March 14 | Houston* | – | Larry H. Miller Field | ESPN+ | 2–9 | Paul Schmitz (1–0) | Ben Hansen (2–2) | None | 1,565 | 7–8 | 1–3 |
| March 15 | Houston* | – | Larry H. Miller Field | ESPN+ | 4–2 | Mason Olson (2–0) | Alex Solis (0–1) | Stone Cushing (4) | 1,804 | 8–8 | 2–3 |
| March 16 | Houston* | – | Larry H. Miller Field | ESPN+ | 10–8 | Candon Dahle (2–1) | Duncan Howard (2–1) | None | 2,114 | 9–8 | 3–3 |
| March 19 | at Utah Valley | – | Bruce Hurst Field | ESPN+ | 11–6 | Jake Porter (1–0) | Jace Carroll (1–1) | None | 1,463 | 10–8 | – |
| March 21 | at Texas Tech* | – | Dan Law Field at Rip Griffin Park | ESPN+ | 8–5 | Ben Hansen (3–2) | Mac Heuer (2–2) | Stone Cushing (5) | 3,449 | 11–8 | 4–3 |
| March 22 | at Texas Tech* | – | Dan Law Field at Rip Griffin Park | ESPN+ | 3–4 | Ryan Free (3–0) | Candon Dahle (2–2) | None | 4,093 | 11–9 | 4–4 |
| March 23 | at Texas Tech* | – | Dan Law Field at Rip Griffin Park | ESPN+ | | | | | | – | – |
| March 25 | Utah Valley | – | Larry H. Miller Field | ESPN+ | | | | | | – | – |
| March 28 | Kansas* | – | Larry H. Miller Field | YouTube | | | | | | – | – |
| March 29 | Kansas* | – | Larry H. Miller Field | ESPN+ | | | | | | – | – |
| March 30 | Kansas* | – | Larry H. Miller Field | ESPN+ | | | | | | – | – |

April

| Date | Opponent | Rank | Site/stadium | Television | Score | Win | Loss | Save | Attendance | Overall record | Big 12 record |
|---|---|---|---|---|---|---|---|---|---|---|---|
| April 4 | at Texas* | – | UFCU Disch-Falk Field | LHN | | | | | | – | – |
| April 5 | at Texas* | – | UFCU Disch-Falk Field | LHN | | | | | | – | – |
| April 6 | at Texas* | – | UFCU Disch-Falk Field | LHN | | | | | | – | – |
| April 9 | at Utah | – | Smith's Ballpark | P12 | | | | | | – | – |
| April 11 | Baylor* | – | Larry H. Miller Field | ESPN+ | | | | | | – | – |
| April 12 | Baylor* | – | Larry H. Miller Field | ESPN+ | | | | | | – | – |
| April 13 | Baylor* | – | Larry H. Miller Field | ESPN+ | | | | | | – | – |
| April 15 | Utah Tech | – | Larry H. Miller Field | ESPN+ | | | | | | – | – |
| April 18 | Oklahoma* | – | Larry H. Miller Field | ESPN+ | | | | | | – | – |
| April 19 | Oklahoma* | – | Larry H. Miller Field | ESPN+ | | | | | | – | – |
| April 20 | Oklahoma* | – | Larry H. Miller Field | ESPN+ | | | | | | – | – |
| April 23 | Utah | – | Larry H. Miller Field | ESPN+ | | | | | | – | – |
| April 25 | at Oklahoma State* | – | O'Brate Stadium | ESPN+ | | | | | | – | – |
| April 26 | at Oklahoma State* | – | O'Brate Stadium | ESPN+ | | | | | | – | – |
| April 27 | at Oklahoma State* | – | O'Brate Stadium | ESPN+ | | | | | | – | – |
| April 29 | Abilene Christian | – | Larry H. Miller Field | ESPN+ | | | | | | – | – |

May

| Date | Opponent | Rank | Site/stadium | Television | Score | Win | Loss | Save | Attendance | Overall record | WCC record |
|---|---|---|---|---|---|---|---|---|---|---|---|
| May 2 | at Miami (FL) | – | Alex Rodriguez Park at Mark Light Field | ACCNX | | | | | | – | – |
| May 3 | at Miami (FL) | – | Alex Rodriguez Park at Mark Light Field | ACCNX | | | | | | – | – |
| May 4 | at Miami (FL) | – | Alex Rodriguez Park at Mark Light Field | ACCNX | | | | | | – | – |
| May 7 | at Utah Valley | – | UCCU Ballpark | ESPN+ | | | | | | – | – |
| May 9 | Cincinnati* | – | Larry H. Miller Field | ESPN+ | | | | | | – | – |
| May 10 | Cincinnati* | – | Larry H. Miller Field | ESPN+ | | | | | | – | – |
| May 11 | Cincinnati* | – | Larry H. Miller Field | ESPN+ | | | | | | – | – |
| May 14 | Grand Canyon | – | Larry H. Miller Field | ESPN+ | | | | | | – | – |
| May 16 | at Kansas State* | – | Tointon Family Stadium | ESPN+ | | | | | | – | – |
| May 17 | at Kansas State* | – | Tointon Family Stadium | ESPN+ | | | | | | – | – |
| May 18 | at Kansas State* | – | Tointon Family Stadium | ESPN+ | | | | | | – | – |

Rankings from Collegiate Baseball. Parenthesis indicate tournament seedings.
*Big 12 Conference games

== Rivalries ==
BYU has three main rivalries on their schedule- the Deseret First Duel vs. Utah, the UCCU Crosstown Clash vs. Utah Valley, and for the fourth consecutive season Utah Tech (formerly Dixie State).

== Radio Information ==
BYU Baseball will once again broadcast as part of the NuSkin BYU Sports Network. BYU Radio 107.9 KUMT will serve as the flagship station. However, due to basketball and conference conflicts select games (Ohio State- Feb. 17, Cal- Feb. 21, West Virginia Game 2- Mar. 8, Texas Tech- Mar. 21 and Texas- Apr. 6) will only be available at byuradio.org and on the BYU Radio App. Jason Shepherd and Greg Wrubell return for most radio broadcasts. However due to basketball conflicts (Wrubell- men's and Shepherd- women's) Dave McCann joins the team for the first 11 road games. Steve Klauke takes care of the Texas Tech road series.

== TV Announcers ==
- USC: Alex Coil and Will Ohman
- Ohio State: Alex Coil and Will Ohman
- Grand Canyon: Alex Coil and Will Ohman
- Cal: Jim Darby
- UC Davis: Greg Wong and Bob Dunning
- Gonzaga: Dave McCann and Gary Sheide
- Gonzaga DH: Dave McCann and Gary Sheide
- UNLV: Matt Neverett and Dan Dolby
- West Virginia: Lanny Frattare and Tyler Barnette
- West Virginia DH: Lanny Frattare and Tyler Barnette
- Houston: Dave McCann and Gary Sheide
- Houston: Dave McCann and Gary Sheide
- Houston: Dave McCann and Gary Sheide
- Utah Tech: Rod Zundel
- Texas Tech: John Harris and Mike Gustafson
- Texas Tech: John Harris and Mike Gustafson
- Texas Tech: John Harris and Mike Gustafson
- Utah Valley: Dave McCann and Gary Sheide
- Kansas: Greg Wrubell
- Kansas DH: Dave McCann and Gary Sheide
- Texas: Keith Moreland and Greg Swindell
- Texas: Keith Moreland and Greg Swindell
- Texas: Keith Moreland and Greg Swindell
- Utah: Roxy Bernstein
- Baylor: Dave McCann and Gary Sheide
- Baylor: Dave McCann and Gary Sheide
- Baylor: Dave McCann and Gary Sheide
- Utah Tech:
- Oklahoma:
- Oklahoma:
- Oklahoma:
- Utah:
- Oklahoma State:
- Oklahoma State:
- Oklahoma State:
- Abilene Christian:
- Miami (FL):
- Miami (FL):
- Miami (FL):
- Utah Valley:
- Cincinnati:
- Cincinnati:
- Cincinnati:
- Grand Canyon:
- Kansas State:
- Kansas State:
- Kansas State:

== See also ==
- 2023 BYU Cougars football team
- 2023–24 BYU Cougars men's basketball team
- 2023–24 BYU Cougars women's basketball team
- 2023 BYU Cougars women's soccer team
- 2023 BYU Cougars women's volleyball team
- 2024 BYU Cougars men's volleyball team
- 2024 BYU Cougars softball team
