= Tim Tadlock =

American baseball coach (born 1968)

Current position
- Title: Head coach
- Team: Texas Tech
- Conference: Big 12
- Record: 500–302 (.623)

Biographical details
- Born: December 21, 1968 (age 57); Denton, Texas, U.S.
- Education: Texas Tech University; University of Texas at Tyler

Playing career
- 1988–1989: Hill College
- 1990–1991: Texas Tech
- Position: Shortstop

Coaching career (HC unless noted)
- 1993–1996: Hill College (asst.)
- 1997–2005: Grayson College
- 2006–2011: Oklahoma (asst.)
- 2012: Texas Tech (asst.)
- 2013–present: Texas Tech

Administrative career (AD unless noted)
- 2000–2005: Grayson College

Head coaching record
- Overall: 500–302 (NCAA); 435–127 (NJCAA)

Accomplishments and honors

Championships
- 3× Big 12 Conference (2016, 2017, 2019); 4× NCAA Super Regional (2014, 2016, 2018, 2019); 5× NCAA Regional (2014, 2016, 2018, 2019, 2021); 2× NJCAA Division I Tournament (1999, 2000); 7× NTJCAC Regular Season (1997-02, 05); 2× NTJCAC Conference Tournament (2003-04)

Awards
- D1Baseball.com Coach of the Year (2018) *Big 12 Coach of the Year (2016) College Baseball Hall of Fame National Coach of the Year (2014) ABCA Midwest Region Coach of the Year (2014) Skip Bertman Award (2014) NJCAA National Coach of the Year (1999, 2000)

Tim Tadlock (born December 21, 1968) is an American collegiate baseball coach and former player. He served as head coach of the Grayson Vikings representing Grayson County College (GCC) (1997–2005) and the Texas Tech Red Raiders representing Texas Tech University (2013–present). Tadlock guided the Grayson Vikings to back-to-back National Junior College Athletic Association (NJCAA) Division I World Series titles in 1999 and 2000. In 2014, Tadlock led his alma mater to their first College World Series appearance and received the Skip Bertman Award, presented to the college baseball coach of the year by the College Baseball Foundation.

== Early years ==
Tadlock was a two-time all-district baseball player while attending Denton High School in Denton, Texas. He was also a member of the 5A State runner-up Bronco golf team his senior year in 1987. After graduating from Denton, Tadlock played infield for two seasons at Hill College before transferring to Texas Tech University, where he was the starting shortstop for two seasons. Tadlock graduated from Texas Tech in May 1992, earning a bachelor's degree in physical education. In August 1994, Tadlock earned a master's degree in education from the University of Texas at Tyler.

== Coaching career ==
=== Texas Tech Red Raiders ===
Tadlock joined the Red Raider coaching staff as the associate head coach under Dan Spencer prior to the 2012 season. Following the firing of Spencer in 2013, Tadlock was promoted to the head coaching position.

==== 2013 season ====
The 2013 season saw the program's first series win over the Texas Longhorns in Austin, Texas, since 2001 and broke school records in both fielding percentage and double plays. The Red Raiders would complete the season with a 26–30 overall record.

==== 2014 season ====
The 2014 season began with a 4–1 series win over the then #3 Indiana Hoosiers. Texas Tech would go on to finish the regular season with a 40–16 record, earning a berth in the Coral Gables Regional of the 2014 NCAA Division I baseball tournament, the first NCAA tournament appearance by the Red Raiders since 2004. The Red Raiders would go on to win the Coral Gables Regional, defeating the Columbia Lions in the opening game and host Miami Hurricanes two games to one. Texas Tech would be the first team since 1992 to pitch 3 straight NCAA tournament shutouts.

The Coral Gables Regional championship earned the Red Raiders their first Super Regional appearance and hosting in Lubbock Super Regional against the College of Charleston Cougars. The Red Raiders would win two straight 1–0 games, the fewest runs scored ever since the Super Regional format was introduced in 1999. The Lubbock Super Regional championship earned the Red Raiders their first College World Series berth in program history. The season was also marked by tying a school record in home wins (33), and breaking a school record with 9 shutouts. The Red Raiders pitching staff's earned run average of 3.17 marked the lowest since 1974.

The Red Raiders would go on to lose two games in the College World Series, finishing with an overall season record of 45–21. With an additional 19 wins than the prior season, Tadlock received the Skip Bertman Award, presented to the college baseball coach of the year by the College Baseball Foundation. The team's finish of 8th place in the USA Today Coaches' Poll tied the 1995 8th-place ranking as the highest in school history. In August 2014, Tadlock received a 5-year contract extension to 2019.

==== 2015 season ====
Losing much of their talent Tadlock's Red Raiders struggled to find any traction in 2015. The team struggled during the 2015 season although they were ranked #15 in the coaches poll entering the season. The Red Raiders finished with a disappointing 30–22 record and a mediocre 13–11 in the Big 12.

==== 2016 season ====
Entering the season unranked by college baseball publications, Tadlock produced one of the best teams in Texas Tech baseball history. Predicted to finish 5th in the Big 12 prior to the 2016 season, Tadlock would lead the Red Raiders to a Big 12 Conference regular season championship with a 40–14 overall record and a 19–5 conference record. The 19–5 record represented the 4th best win percentage in conference history, earning Tadlock a contract extension through 2022 and $100,000 raise. Tadlock was named the Big 12 Coach of the Year and player Eric Gutierrez won Big 12 Player of the Year. Tadlock would lead the Red Raiders to the 2016 College World Series, the program's second overall appearance and the second under Tadlock by winning the Lubbock Regional and Lubbock Super Regional.

== Head coaching record ==
=== NJCAA ===
Record table
Season	Team	Overall	Conference	Standing	Postseason
Grayson Vikings (NTJCAC) (1997–2005)
1997	Grayson	49–9			
1998	Grayson	47–18			NJCAA World Series
1999	Grayson	55–13			W NJCAA World Series
2000	Grayson	55–11			W NJCAA World Series
2001	Grayson	40–20			
2002	Grayson	45–13			
2003	Grayson	55–15			NJCAA World Series
2004	Grayson	45–17			NJCAA World Series
2005	Grayson	45–13			
Grayson:		435–127 (.774)			
Total:		435–127 (.774)			
National champion Postseason invitational champion Conference regular season champion Conference regular season and conference tournament champion Division regular season champion Division regular season and conference tournament champion Conference tournament champion

=== NCAA ===
Record table
Season	Team	Overall	Conference	Standing	Postseason
Texas Tech Red Raiders (Big 12 Conference) (2013–present)
2013	Texas Tech	26–30	9–15	8th	
2014	Texas Tech	45–19	14–10	4th	College World Series
2015	Texas Tech	31–24	13–11	T–3rd	
2016	Texas Tech	47–20	19–5	1st	College World Series
2017	Texas Tech	45–17	16–8	T–1st	NCAA Regional
2018	Texas Tech	45–20	15–9	3rd	College World Series
2019	Texas Tech	46–20	16–8	1st	College World Series
2020	Texas Tech	16–3	0–0		Season canceled due to COVID-19
2021	Texas Tech	39–17	14–10	3rd	NCAA Super Regional
2022	Texas Tech	39–22	15–9	T–2nd	NCAA Regional
2023	Texas Tech	41–23	12–12	6th	NCAA Regional
2024	Texas Tech	33–26	12–17	10th	Big 12 tournament
2025	Texas Tech	20–33	13–17	T–9th	Big 12 tournament
2026	Texas Tech	27–28	10–20	12th	Big 12 tournament
Texas Tech:		500–302 (.623)	178–151 (.541)		
Total:		500–302 (.623)			
National champion Postseason invitational champion Conference regular season champion Conference regular season and conference tournament champion Division regular season champion Division regular season and conference tournament champion Conference tournament champion
