= 2024 Texas Tech Red Raiders baseball team =

American college baseball season

2024 Texas Tech Red Raiders baseball
- Conference: Big 12 Conference
- Record: 33–26 (12–18 Big 12)
- Head coach: Tim Tadlock (12th season)
- Assistant coaches: J-Bob Thomas (12th season); Matt Gardner (11th season); Eric Gutierrez (6th season)
- Pitching coach: Ray Hayward (12th season)
- Home stadium: Dan Law Field at Rip Griffin Park

2024 Big 12 Conference baseball standings
	Conf.				Overall
Team	W		L	PCT	W		L	PCT
No. 18 Oklahoma ‍†‍‍^{y}	23	–	7	.767	40	–	21	.656
No. 21 Oklahoma State ‍‍‡‍^{y}	19	–	9	.679	42	–	19	.689
Texas ‍‍‍^{y}	20	–	10	.667	36	–	24	.600
No. 13 West Virginia ‍‍‍^{y}	19	–	11	.633	36	–	24	.600
Cincinnati ‍‍‍	17	–	13	.567	32	–	25	.561
No. 14 Kansas State ‍‍‍^{y}	15	–	15	.500	35	–	26	.574
Kansas ‍‍‍	15	–	15	.500	31	–	23	.574
UCF ‍‍‍^{y}	14	–	15	.483	37	–	21	.638
TCU ‍‍‍	14	–	16	.467	33	–	21	.611
Texas Tech ‍‍‍	12	–	17	.414	33	–	26	.559
Baylor ‍‍‍	10	–	20	.333	22	–	31	.415
Houston ‍‍‍	7	–	21	.250	26	–	28	.481
BYU ‍‍‍	7	–	23	.233	21	–	31	.404
† – Conference champion ‡ – Tournament champion y – Invited to the NCAA tournament As of June 26, 2024; Rankings from D1baseball

The 2024 Texas Tech Red Raiders baseball team represented Texas Tech University during the 2024 NCAA Division I baseball season. The Red Raiders played their home games at Dan Law Field at Rip Griffin Park in Lubbock, Texas and compete as members of the Big 12 Conference. They were led by twelfth-year head coach Tim Tadlock. For the first time since 2015, the Red Raiders failed to qualify for an NCAA regional.

On February 23, in the series opener against Texas Southern, the Red Raiders scored 32 runs to break the program record for most runs in a single game.

== Preseason ==
=== Big 12 media poll ===
The Big 12 preseason poll was released on January 25. The Red Raiders were predicted to finish fourth in the conference.

Big 12 media poll
Predicted finish	Team	Votes (1st place)
1	TCU	143 (11)
2	Texas	131 (2)
3	Oklahoma State	119
4	Texas Tech	107
5	Kansas State	98
6	Oklahoma	85
6	West Virginia	85
8	Kansas	67
9	Houston	56
10	UCF	45
11	Baylor	36
12	BYU	21
12	Cincinnati	21

== Personnel ==
=== Coaching staff ===
Name	Position	Seasons at Texas Tech	Alma mater
Tim Tadlock	Head coach	12	Texas Tech University (1992)
J-Bob Thomas	Assistant coach / Recruiting coordinator	12	Abilene Christian University (2005)
Ray Hayward	Special assistant / Pitching coach	12	University of Oklahoma (1983)
Matt Gardner	Assistant coach	11	Oklahoma State University (2008)
Eric Gutierrez	Director of operations	6	Texas Tech University (2016)

=== Roster ===
2024 Texas Tech Red Raiders baseball roster
Pitchers: 8 Hudson Parker (RHP) – junior (6'0, 200); 12 Cade McGee (RHP) – junior (6'1, 195); 17 Parker Hutyra (RHP) – freshman (6'4, 195); 18 Isaiah Rhodes (RHP) – senior (6'2, 173); 19 Joe Sockwell (RHP) – freshman (6'2, 190); 25 Owen Washburn (RHP) – junior (6'1, 200); 28 Taber Fast (LHP) – sophomore (6'1, 205); 29 Carson Priebe (RHP) – freshman (6'5, 225); 30 Cole Kaase (RHP) – freshman (6'3, 225); 31 Damian Bravo (RHP) – sophomore (6'2, 195); 32 Trendan Parish (RHP) – junior (6'0, 175); 33 Chanlder Coe (RHP) – freshman (6'6, 265); 34 Zane Petty (RHP) – sophomore (6'1, 165); 37 Carson Baugh (LHP) – junior (6'1, 175); 38 Jacob Rogers (RHP) – sophomore (6'2, 200); 41 Brady Trombello (RHP) – freshman (6'2, 180); 42 Kyle Robinson (RHP) – junior (6'6, 210); 43 Brendan Lysik (LHP) – junior (6'5, 225); 44 Hudson Luce (LHP) – (redshirt) senior (6'7, 210); 45 Derek Bridges (LHP) – senior (6'1, 230); 46 Ryan Free (LHP) – senior (6'2, 190); 48 Mac Heuer (RHP) – freshman (6'5, 265); 51 Zach Erdman (LHP) – sophomore (6'2, 185); 52 Josh Sanders (RHP) – senior (6'3, 180); 54 Max Huffling (LHP) – senior (6'9, 255); 56 Jack Washburn (RHP) – (redshirt) junior (6'2, 215)	Catchers: 4 Kevin Bazzell – sophomore (6'1, 205); 8 Hudson Parker – junior (6'0, 200); 11 Davis Rivers – freshman (6'0, 195); 26 Dylan Maxcey – sophomore (5'9, 165); 35 Solen Munson – freshman (6'1, 200); Infielders: 3 Tracer Lopez – sophomore (5'10, 155); 4 Kevin Bazzell – sophomore (6'1, 205); 5 T. J. Pompey – freshman (6'4, 200); 7 Garet Boehm – freshman (6'3, 215); 11 Davis Rivers – freshman (6'0, 195); 12 Cade McGee – junior (6'1, 195); 13 Gavin Kash – junior (6'3, 210); 14 Travis Sanders – (redshirt) freshman (6'1, 185); 15 Will Burns – sophomore (6'2, 180); 16 Landon Stripling – freshman (6'0, 200); 20 Austin Green – senior (6'0, 195); 50 Drew Woodcox – senior (6'0, 205); Outfielders: 2 Gage Harrelson – sophomore (6'3, 175); 20 Austin Green – senior (6'0, 195); 25 Owen Washburn – junior (6'1, 200); 50 Drew Woodcox – senior (6'0, 205)

== Schedule ==
2024 Texas Tech Red Raiders baseball game log: 33–26
Regular season: 31–24

February: 6–2
Date	Time	Opponent	Rank	Stadium	Score	Win	Loss	Save	Attendance	Overall	Big 12	Ref
Shriner's Children's College Showdown
February 16	7:00 p.m.	vs. No. 9 Tennessee*	No. 21	Globe Life Field; Arlington, TX	**L** 2–6	Causey (1–0)	**Robinson** (0–1)	—	10,992	0–1	—	
February 17	3:00 p.m.	vs. Nebraska*	No. 21	Globe Life Field; Arlington, TX	**W** 6–3	**Free** (1–0)	McConnaughey (0–1)	**Hutyra** (1)	N/A	1–1	—	
February 18	3:00 p.m.	vs. Oregon*	No. 21	Globe Life Field; Arlington, TX	**W** 11–7	**Sanders** (1–0)	Spoljaric (0–1)	**Huffling** (1)	N/A	2–1	—	
February 20	6:00 p.m.	vs. UT Arlington*	No. 19	Globe Life Field; Arlington, TX	**W** 13–1	**Trombello** (1–0)	Wallace (0–2)	—	1,094	3–1	—	
February 21	12:00 p.m.	vs. No. 7 Oregon State*	No. 19	Globe Life Field; Arlington, TX	**L** 4–10	Lawson (1–0)	**Rogers** (0–1)	—	1,296	3–2	—	
February 23	2:00 p.m.	Texas Southern*	No. 19	Dan Law Field; Lubbock, TX	**W** 32–5	**Robinson** (1–1)	Marquez (0–1)	—	4,113	4–2	—	
February 24	2:00 p.m.	Texas Southern*	No. 19	Dan Law Field; Lubbock, TX	**W** 20–4	**Free** (2–0)	Martinez (0–1)	—	4,432	5–2	—	
February 25	1:00 p.m.	Texas Southern*	No. 19	Dan Law Field; Lubbock, TX	**W** 16–5 (7)	**Washburn** (1–0)	Castro (0–1)	—	3,952	6–2	—	

March: 13–7
Date	Time	Opponent	Rank	Stadium	Score	Win	Loss	Save	Attendance	Overall	Big 12	Ref
March 1	6:30 p.m.	Gardner–Webb*	No. 18	Dan Law Field; Lubbock, TX	**W** 10–7	**Robinson** (2–1)	Brogdon (0–3)	**Free** (1)	4,308	7–2	—	
March 2	2:00 p.m.	Gardner–Webb*	No. 18	Dan Law Field; Lubbock, TX	**W** 29–3	**Heuer** (1–0)	Ciminiello (0–1)	—	4,432	8–2	—	
March 3	2:00 p.m.	Gardner–Webb*	No. 18	Dan Law Field; Lubbock, TX	**W** 9–5	**Parish** (1–0)	Pressley (0–1)	—	3,875	9–2	—	
March 5	3:00 p.m.	at New Mexico*	No. 17	Santa Ana Star Field; Albuquerque, NM	**W** 11–8	**Petty** (1–0)	Steinkamp (0–1)	**Parish** (1)	545	10–2	—	
March 8	6:30 p.m.	No. 24 Texas	No. 17	Dan Law Field; Lubbock, TX	**L** 8–22	Whitehead (1–0)	**Robinson** (2–2)	—	4,432	10–3	0–1	
March 9	2:00 p.m.	No. 24 Texas	No. 17	Dan Law Field; Lubbock, TX	**W** 7–2	**Heuer** (2–0)	Howard (2–1)	—	4,432	11–3	1–1	
March 10	2:00 p.m.	No. 24 Texas	No. 17	Dan Law Field; Lubbock, TX	**L** 7–9	Tumis (2–0)	**Parish** (1–1)	Boehm (2)	4,432	11–4	1–2	
March 12	6:30 p.m.	New Mexico State*	No. 24	Dan Law Field; Lubbock, TX	**W** 13–7	**Petty** (2–0)	Swenson (0–1)	—	4,229	12–4	—	
March 13	2:00 p.m.	New Mexico State*	No. 24	Dan Law Field; Lubbock, TX	**W** 9–7	**Hutyra** (1–0)	Zwaschka (0–2)	**Parish** (2)	4,024	13–4	—	
March 15	6:30 p.m.	at Baylor	No. 24	Baylor Ballpark; Waco, TX	**W** 2–0	**Robinson** (3–2)	Marriott (0–3)	**Sanders** (1)	2,718	14–4	2–2	
March 16	2:00 p.m.	at Baylor	No. 24	Baylor Ballpark; Waco, TX	**L** 1–5	Ruais (1–0)	**Heuer** (2–1)	—	2,234	14–5	2–3	
March 17	1:00 p.m.	at Baylor	No. 24	Baylor Ballpark; Waco, TX	**L** 2–7	Green (1–1)	**Washburn** (1–1)	—	2,460	14–6	2–4	
March 19	6:30 p.m.	Abilene Christian*		Dan Law Field; Lubbock, TX	**W** 9–4	**Hutyra** (2–0)	De La Cruz (0–2)	—	3,769	15–6	—	
March 21	6:30 p.m.	BYU		Dan Law Field; Lubbock, TX	**L** 5–8	Hansen (3–2)	**Heuer** (2–2)	Cushing (5)	3,449	15–7	2–5	
March 22	6:30 p.m.	BYU		Dan Law Field; Lubbock, TX	**W** 4–3	**Free** (3–0)	Dahle (2–2)	—	4,093	16–7	3–5	
March 23	2:00 p.m.	BYU		Dan Law Field; Lubbock, TX	**W** 10–1	**Rogers** (1–1)	Clawson (0–4)	—	4,306	17–7	4–5	
March 26	12:35 p.m.	Stephen F. Austin*		Dan Law Field; Lubbock, TX	**W** 16–4 (8)	**Parish** (2–1)	Wilson (0–1)	—	3,258	18–7	—	
March 28	6:35 p.m.	at UCF		John Euliano Park; Orlando, FL	**L** 4–5	Kramer (4–0)	**Sanders** (1–1)	—	1,908	18–8	4–6	
March 29	5:00 p.m.	at UCF		John Euliano Park; Orlando, FL	**L** 1–2	Stagliano (1–1)	**Robinson** (3–3)	Centala (6)	2,106	18–9	4–7	
March 30	12:00 p.m.	at UCF		John Euliano Park; Orlando, FL	**W** 3–2	**Heuer** (3–2)	Hartley (2–2)	**Kaase** (1)	2,024	19–9	5–7	

April: 11–8
Date	Time	Opponent	Rank	Stadium	Score	Win	Loss	Save	Attendance	Overall	Big 12	Ref
April 1	6:30 p.m.	Stanford*		Dan Law Field; Lubbock, TX	**W** 10–9	**Hutyra** (3–0)	Thomas (0–1)	—	3,537	20–9	—	
April 2	12:00 p.m.	Stanford*		Dan Law Field; Lubbock, TX	**W** 15–12	**Luce** (1–0)	Volchko (0–1)	—	3,213	21–9	—	
April 5	6:30 p.m.	Houston		Dan Law Field; Lubbock, TX	**W** 12–9	**Sanders** (2–1)	Benzor (1–1)	—	4,006	22–9	6–7	
April 6	2:00 p.m.	Houston		Dan Law Field; Lubbock, TX	**W** 15–12	**Hutyra** (4–0)	LaCalameto (2–2)	—	4,432	23–9	7–7	
April 7	1:00 p.m.	Houston		Dan Law Field; Lubbock, TX	**W** 12–8	**Sanders** (3–1)	Howard (2–1)	—	3,922	24–9	8–7	
April 9	6:05 p.m.	at Abilene Christian*		Crutcher Scott Field; Abilene, TX	**W** 21–3	**Luce** (2–0)	McGarrh (2–4)	—	1,153	25–9	—	
April 12	6:30 p.m.	at TCU		Lupton Stadium; Fort Worth, TX	**W** 7–1	**Free** (4–0)	Tolle (3–3)	—	5,073	26–9	9–7	
April 13	4:00 p.m.	at TCU		Lupton Stadium; Fort Worth, TX	**L** 2–4	Abeldt (2–0)	**Robinson** (3–4)	Klecker (1)	5,236	26–10	9–8	
April 14	1:00 p.m.	at TCU		Lupton Stadium; Fort Worth, TX	**L** 3–4	Hampton (1–1)	**Heuer** (3–3)	Parker (1)	4,628	26–11	9–9	
April 16	7:00 p.m.	at No. 2 Arkansas*		Baum–Walker Stadium; Fayetteville, AR	**L** 8–9	Gaeckle (2–2)	**Hutyra** (4–1)	—	9,770	26–12	—	
April 17	4:00 p.m.	at No. 2 Arkansas*		Baum–Walker Stadium; Fayetteville, AR	**L** 4–5	Dossett (2–0)	**Bridges** (0–1)	Hewlett (3)	9,645	26–13	—	
April 19	6:30 p.m.	No. 22 West Virginia		Dan Law Field; Lubbock, TX	**W** 15–2	**Free**; 5–0	Major (3–3)	—	4,136	27–13	10–9	
April 20	2:00 p.m.	No. 22 West Virginia		Dan Law Field; Lubbock, TX	**Postponed to April 21**							
April 21	1:05 p.m.	No. 22 West Virginia		Dan Law Field; Lubbock, TX	**W** 6–4	**Heuer** (4–3)	Clark (4–1)	**Sanders** (2)	4,432	28–13	11–9	
April 21	4:40 p.m.	No. 22 West Virginia		Dan Law Field; Lubbock, TX	**W** 3–1	**Robinson** (4–4)	Switalski (1–2)	**Rogers** (1)	4,432	29–13	12–9	
April 23	2:00 p.m.	New Mexico*		Dan Law Field; Lubbock, TX	**L** 3–17	Steinkamp (2–1)	**Luce** (2–1)	—	3,691	29–14	—	
April 26	6:00 p.m.	at Kansas		Hoglund Ballpark; Lawrence, KS	**L** 3–4	Cranton (3–2)	**Hutyra** (4–2)	—	826	29–15	12–10	
April 27	2:00 p.m.	at Kansas		Hoglund Ballpark; Lawrence, KS	**L** 2–11	Voegele (6–2)	**Robinson** (4–5)	—	884	29–16	12–11	
April 28	1:00 p.m.	at Kansas		Hoglund Ballpark; Lawrence, KS	**L** 3–7	Lanthier (3–0)	**Heuer** (4–4)	—	784	29–17	12–12	
April 30	6:30 p.m.	UTRGV*		Dan Law Field; Lubbock, TX	**W** 11–6	**Sanders** (4–1)	Davis (0–1)	—	4,262	30–17	—	

May: 1–7
Date	Time	Opponent	Rank	Site/stadium	Score	Win	Loss	Save	Attendance	Overall	Big 12	Ref
May 3	6:30 p.m.	No. 22 Oklahoma		Dan Law Field; Lubbock, TX	**L** 0–8	Davis (6–3)	**Free** (5–1)	—	4,028	30–18	12–13	
May 4	2:00 p.m.	No. 22 Oklahoma		Dan Law Field; Lubbock, TX	**L** 5–7	Witherspoon (5–3)	**Robinson** (4–6)	—	3,937	30–19	12–14	
May 5	2:00 p.m.	No. 22 Oklahoma		Dan Law Field; Lubbock, TX	**L** 7–8	Campbell (3–0)	**Heuer** (4–5)	Witherspoon (3)	3,782	30–20	12–15	
May 10	6:00 p.m.	at No. 19 Oklahoma State		O'Brate Stadium; Stillwater, OK	**L** 4–16	Garcia (5–3)	**Free** (5–2)	—	5,486	30–21	12–16	
May 11	6:00 p.m.	at No. 19 Oklahoma State		O'Brate Stadium; Stillwater, OK	**L** 3–9	Blake (4–0)	**Robinson** (4–7)	Cranz (2)	5,602	30–22	12–17	
May 12	2:00 p.m.	at No. 19 Oklahoma State		O'Brate Stadium; Stillwater, OK	**Canceled**							
May 16	8:30 p.m.	at Arizona State*		Phoenix Municipal Stadium; Phoenix, AZ	**L** 5–21 (7)	Jacobs (7–2)	**Hutyra** (4–3)	—	2,363	30–23	—	
May 17	3:00 p.m.	vs. UNLV*		Phoenix Municipal Stadium; Phoenix, AZ	**W** 13–12	**Washburn** (2–1)	Maloney (3–3)	—	N/A	31–23	—	
May 17	8:30 p.m.	at Arizona State*		Phoenix Municipal Stadium; Phoenix, AZ	**L** 11–17	Fitzpatrick (3–2)	**Lysik** (0–1)	—	2,876	31–24	—	

Post–season: 2–2

Big 12 Tournament: 2–2
Date	Time	Opponent	Seed/Rank	Stadium	Score	Win	Loss	Save	Attendance	Overall	B12T	Ref
May 21	7:30 p.m.	vs. (3) No. 24 Texas	(10)	Globe Life Field; Arlington, TX	**W** 6–4	**Sanders** (5–1)	Duplantier II (2–1)	—	8,349	32–24	1–0	
May 22	7:30 p.m.	vs. (2) No. 19 Oklahoma State	(10)	Globe Life Field; Arlington, TX	**L** 2–7	Benge (3–1)	**Erdman** (0–1)	—	7,110	32–25	1–1	
May 23	4:00 p.m.	vs. (5) Cincinnati	(10)	Globe Life Field; Arlington, TX	**W** 10–5	**Free** (6–2)	Conte (2–1)	—	N/A	33–25	2–1	
May 24	4:00 p.m.	vs. (2) No. 19 Oklahoma State	(10)	Globe Life Field; Arlington, TX	**L** 0–4	Garcia (7–3)	**Parish** (2–2)	—	N/A	33–26	2–2	

Legend: = Win = Loss = Canceled
Bold = Texas Tech team member

* indicates a non-conference game. All rankings from D1Baseball on the date of the contest. All times are in central time.

== Rankings ==
Ranking movements Legend: ██ Increase in ranking ██ Decrease in ranking — = Not ranked RV = Received votes
	Week																		
Poll	Pre	1	2	3	4	5	6	7	8	9	10	11	12	13	14	15	16	17	Final
Coaches	22	22*	19	17	25	RV	RV	RV	RV	RV	RV	RV	—	—	—	—			
Baseball America	18	17	16	14	24	—	—	—	—	—	—	—	—	—	—	—			
Perfect Game	—	—	—	24	—	—	—	—	—	—	—	—	—	—	—	—			
NCBWA	20	20	18	17	23	RV	RV	RV	RV	RV	RV	RV	—	—	—	—			
D1Baseball	20	19	18	17	24	—	—	—	—	—	—	—	—	—	—	—			

* A new poll was not released for this week, so for comparison purposes, the previous week's ranking is inserted in this week's slot.
