= 2024 Oklahoma State Cowboys baseball team =

College Baseball Season

2024 Oklahoma State Cowboys baseball

Big 12 tournament champions

Stillwater Regional, 2-2
- Conference: Big 12 Conference
- Record: 42–19 (19–9 Big 12)
- Head coach: Josh Holliday (12th season)
- Assistant coaches: Rob Walton (12th season); Mark Ginther (1st season); Victor Romero (1st season)
- Home stadium: O'Brate Stadium

2024 Big 12 Conference baseball standings
	Conf.				Overall
Team	W		L	PCT	W		L	PCT
No. 18 Oklahoma ‍†‍‍^{y}	23	–	7	.767	40	–	21	.656
No. 21 Oklahoma State ‍‍‡‍^{y}	19	–	9	.679	42	–	19	.689
Texas ‍‍‍^{y}	20	–	10	.667	36	–	24	.600
No. 13 West Virginia ‍‍‍^{y}	19	–	11	.633	36	–	24	.600
Cincinnati ‍‍‍	17	–	13	.567	32	–	25	.561
No. 14 Kansas State ‍‍‍^{y}	15	–	15	.500	35	–	26	.574
Kansas ‍‍‍	15	–	15	.500	31	–	23	.574
UCF ‍‍‍^{y}	14	–	15	.483	37	–	21	.638
TCU ‍‍‍	14	–	16	.467	33	–	21	.611
Texas Tech ‍‍‍	12	–	17	.414	33	–	26	.559
Baylor ‍‍‍	10	–	20	.333	22	–	31	.415
Houston ‍‍‍	7	–	21	.250	26	–	28	.481
BYU ‍‍‍	7	–	23	.233	21	–	31	.404
† – Conference champion ‡ – Tournament champion y – Invited to the NCAA tournament As of June 26, 2024; Rankings from D1baseball

The 2024 Oklahoma State Cowboys baseball team represented Oklahoma State University during the 2024 NCAA Division I baseball season. The Cowboys played their home games at O'Brate Stadium as a member of the Big 12 Conference. They were led by head coach Josh Holliday, in his twelfth season at Oklahoma State.

== Background ==
The 2023 Oklahoma State baseball team finished the season with a 41–18 overall record and a 15–9 record in the Big 12 Conference. They won the Big 12 regular season for the first time since 2014. The Pokes went 4–2 in the 2023 Big 12 Conference baseball tournament, but earned an at-large berth into the 2023 NCAA Division I baseball tournament. There, the Pokes were seeded 11th overall and hosted the Stillwater Regional. In the tournament, Oklahoma went 0–2 being eliminated by No. 18 Dallas Baptist.

== Preseason ==
=== Big 12 media poll ===
Big 12 media poll
Predicted finish	Team	Votes (1st place)
1	TCU	143 (11)
2	Texas	131 (2)
3	Oklahoma State	119
4	Texas Tech	107
5	Kansas State	98
T–6	Oklahoma	85
T–6	West Virginia	85
8	Kansas	67
9	Houston	56
10	UCF	45
11	Baylor	36
T–12	BYU	21
T–12	Cincinnati	21

== Offseason ==
=== 2023 MLB draft ===
Round	Pick	Player	Position	MLB Team
3	89	Juaron Watts-Brown	RHP	Toronto Blue Jays
3	91	Nolan McLean	3B	New York Mets
4	129	Roc Riggio	2B	New York Yankees
5	138	Marcus Brown	SS	Washington Nationals
10	312	Brian Hendry	RHP	New York Yankees
16	478	Isaac Stebens	LHP	Boston Red Sox

== Schedule and results ==
2023 Oklahoma State Cowboys baseball game log (42-19)
Regular season (36–16)

February (4–4)
Date	Opponent	Rank	Site/stadium	Score	Win	Loss	Save	TV	Attendance	Overall record	B12 Record
February 16	at Sam Houston*	No. 21	Don Sanders Stadium; Huntsville, TX	**L** 2–7	Atkinson (1–0)	**Garcia** (0–1)	Hewitt (1)	ESPN+	1,181	0–1	—
February 17	at Sam Houston*	No. 21	Don Sanders Stadium	**L** 1–2	David (1–0)	**Cranz** (0–1)	None	ESPN+	979	0–2	—
February 18	at Sam Houston*	No. 21	Don Sanders Stadium	**W** 19–2	**Keisel** (1–0)	Hellums (0–1)	None	ESPN+	1,014	1–2	—
February 21	at Abilene Christian*		Crutcher Scott Field; Abilene, TX	**W** 8–4	**Weber** (1–0)	Greanead (0–1)	None		1,063	2–2	—
Kubota College Baseball Series
February 23	vs. Michigan*		Globe Life Field; Arlington, TX	**W** 9–3	**Garcia** (1–1)	Voit (0–1)	None	FloBaseball	13,038	3–2	—
February 24	vs. No. 2 Arkansas*		Globe Life Field	**W** 2–1^{14}	**Molsky** (1–0)	Fisher (1–1)	None	FloBaseball	16,271	4–2	—
February 25	vs. No. 7 Oregon State*		Globe Life Field	**L** 1–8	Segura (1–0)	**Keisel** (1–1)	None	FloBaseball	7,459	4–3	—
February 27	at Dallas Baptist*		Horner Ballpark; Dallas, TX	**L** 4–14^{7}	Wilson (2–0)	**Bogusz** (0–1)	None	ESPN+	1,274	4–4	—

March (14–6)
Date	Opponent	Rank	Site/stadium	Score	Win	Loss	Save	TV	Attendance	Overall record	B12 Record
March 1	Central Michigan*		O'Brate Stadium; Stillwater, OK	**W** 7–4	**O'Toole** (1–0)	Miller (0–2)	**Davis** (1)	B12N	4,363	5–4	—
March 2	Central Michigan*		O'Brate Stadium	**W** 8–1	**Holiday** (1–0)	Batka (0–2)	None	B12N	5,204	6–4	—
March 3	Central Michigan*		O'Brate Stadium	**W** 19–0	**Keisel** (2–1)	Mrakitsch (1–2)	None	B12N	4,765	7–4	—
March 5	Utah Tech*		O'Brate Stadium	**L** 8–9	Vasiliou (1–2)	**Weber** (1–1)	Hardman (1)	B12N	3,875	7–5	—
March 6	Utah Tech*		O'Brate Stadium	**W** 12–2^{7}	**Hudgens** (1–0)	Marshall (0–1)	None	B12N	3,902	8–5	—
March 8	Mercer*		O'Brate Stadium	**W** 4–2	**Garcia** (2–1)	Cosper (1–1)	**Davis** (2)	B12N	5,139	9–5	—
March 9	Mercer*		O'Brate Stadium	**L** 1–4	Yntema (2–1)	**Holiday** (1–1)	Olson (5)	B12N	5,139	9–6	—
March 10	Mercer*		O'Brate Stadium	**W** 4–3	**Blake** (1–0)	**O'Neal** (0–2)	**Benge** (1)	B12N	4,228	10–6	—
March 12	at Oklahoma*		Mitchell Park; Norman, OK	**W** 14–5	**Davis** (1–0)	Carsten (0–1)	None	ESPN+	4,177	11–6	—
March 15	at UCF		Euliano Park; Orlando, FL	**L** 2–13	Vespi (2–0)	Garcia (2–2)	None	B12N	2,256	11–7	0–1
March 16	at UCF		Euliano Park	**L** 3–4	Centala (2–0)	Davis (1–1)	None	B12N	2,189	11–8	0–2
March 17	at UCF		Euliano Park	**W** 16-10	**Molsky** (2-0)	Boxrucker (1-1)	None	B12N	1,749	12-8	1-2
March 19	Missouri State*		O'Brate Stadium	**W** 13-4	Blake (2-0)	Beaver (0-2)	None	B12N	4,499	13-8	—
March 22	TCU		O'Brate Stadium	**L** 0-1	Tolle (2-1)	Garcia (2-3)	None	B12N	4,979	13-9	1-3
March 23	TCU		O'Brate Stadium	**W** 6-2	Holiday (2-1)	Klecker (0-2)	None	B12N	5,309	14-9	2-3
March 24	TCU		O'Brate Stadium	**W** 6-3	Molshy (3-0)	Sloan (3-2)	None	B12N	4,184	15-9	3-3
March 26	at Wichita State*		Eck Stadium; Wichita, KS	**W** 3-0	**Ure** (1-0)	Dobbs (4-2)	**Cranz** (1)	ESPN+	844	16-9	—
March 29	at West Virginia		Monongalia County Ballpark; Morgantown, WV	**W** 2-1	Garcia (3-3)	Major (3-2)	Benge (2)	B12N	3,088	17-9	4-3
March 30	at West Virginia		Monongalia County Ballpark	**W** 10-1^{11}	Molsky (4-0)	Hagaman (1-3)	None	B12N	2,778	18-9	5-3
March 31	at West Virginia		Monongalia County Ballpark	**L** 10-15	Yehl (1-0)	Davis (1-2)	Estridge (1)	B12N	2,547	18-10	5-4

April (13-4)
Date	Opponent	Rank	Site/stadium	Score	Win	Loss	Save	TV	Attendance	Overall record	B12 Record
April 2	Oral Roberts*		O'Brate Stadium	B12N							—
April 5	Oklahoma		O'Brate Stadium					B12N			
April 6	Oklahoma		O'Brate Stadium					B12N			
April 7	Oklahoma		O'Brate Stadium					B12N			
April 9	at Wichita State*		Eck Stadium					ESPN+			—
April 12	Cincinnati		O'Brate Stadium					B12N			
April 13	Cincinnati		O'Brate Stadium					B12N			
April 14	Cincinnati		O'Brate Stadium					B12N			
April 16	Dallas Baptist*		O'Brate Stadium					B12N			—
April 19	at Kansas State		Tointon Family Stadium; Manhattan, KS					B12N			
April 20	at Kansas State		Tointon Family Stadium					B12N			
April 21	at Kansas State		Tointon Family Stadium					ESPNU			
April 23	at Oral Roberts*		J. L. Johnson Stadium; Tulsa, OK								—
April 25	BYU		O'Brate Stadium					B12N			
April 26	BYU		O'Brate Stadium					B12N			
April 27	BYU		O'Brate Stadium					B12N			
April 30	Wichita State*		O'Brate Stadium				B12N				—

May (5-2)
Date	Opponent	Rank	Site/stadium	Score	Win	Loss	Save	TV	Attendance	Overall record	B12 Record
May 3	at Texas		Disch-Falk Field; Austin, TX					LHN			
May 4	at Texas		Disch-Falk Field					LHN			
May 5	at Texas		Disch-Falk Field					LHN			
May 10	Texas Tech		O'Brate Stadium					B12N			
May 11	Texas Tech		O'Brate Stadium					B12N			
May 12	Texas Tech		O'Brate Stadium					B12N			
May 16	at Houston		Schroeder Park; Houston, TX					B12N			
May 17	at Houston		Schroeder Park					B12N			
May 18	at Houston		Schroeder Park					B12N			

Postseason (6–3)

Big 12 Tournament (4-1)
Date	Opponent	Rank	Site/stadium	Score	Win	Loss	Save	TV	Attendance	Overall record	B12T Record
May 21–25	vs.		Globe Life Field					B12N			

NCAA Regional (2-2)
Date	Opponent	Rank	Site/stadium	Score	Win	Loss	Save	TV	Attendance	Overall record	NCAAT record
May 31–June 3	vs.		TBD								

Legend: = Win = Loss = Canceled
Bold = Oklahoma State team member
"*" indicates a non-conference game.
"#" represents ranking. All rankings are based on the team's current ranking in the D1Baseball poll.
"()" represents postseason seeding in the Big 12 Tournament or NCAA Regional, respectively.

== Rankings ==
Ranking movements Legend: ██ Increase in ranking ██ Decrease in ranking — = Not ranked RV = Received votes
	Week																			
Poll	Pre	1	2	3	4	5	6	7	8	9	10	11	12	13	14	15	16	17	18	Final
Coaches'	RV	RV*	RV																	
Baseball America	21	—	—																	
NCBWA†	29	RV	RV																	
D1Baseball	—	—	—																	
Perfect Game	22	—	—																	

† NCBWA ranks 30 teams in their preseason poll, but only ranks 25 teams weekly during the season.
* A new poll was not released for this week, so for comparison purposes, the previous week's ranking is inserted in this week's slot.
