= 2024 West Virginia Mountaineers baseball team =

American college baseball season

2024 West Virginia Mountaineers baseball

NCAA Tucson Regional champions

NCAA Chapel Hill Super Regional, 0–2
- Conference: Big 12 Conference

Ranking
- Coaches: No. 17
- D1Baseball.com: No. 13
- Record: 36–24 (19–11 Big 12)
- Head coach: Randy Mazey (12th season)
- Assistant coaches: Steve Sabins (9th season); Jacob Garcia (5th season); Jimmy Roesinger (2nd season)
- Home stadium: Wagener Field at Kendrick Family Ballpark

2024 Big 12 Conference baseball standings
	Conf.				Overall
Team	W		L	PCT	W		L	PCT
No. 18 Oklahoma ‍†‍‍^{y}	23	–	7	.767	40	–	21	.656
No. 21 Oklahoma State ‍‍‡‍^{y}	19	–	9	.679	42	–	19	.689
Texas ‍‍‍^{y}	20	–	10	.667	36	–	24	.600
No. 13 West Virginia ‍‍‍^{y}	19	–	11	.633	36	–	24	.600
Cincinnati ‍‍‍	17	–	13	.567	32	–	25	.561
No. 14 Kansas State ‍‍‍^{y}	15	–	15	.500	35	–	26	.574
Kansas ‍‍‍	15	–	15	.500	31	–	23	.574
UCF ‍‍‍^{y}	14	–	15	.483	37	–	21	.638
TCU ‍‍‍	14	–	16	.467	33	–	21	.611
Texas Tech ‍‍‍	12	–	17	.414	33	–	26	.559
Baylor ‍‍‍	10	–	20	.333	22	–	31	.415
Houston ‍‍‍	7	–	21	.250	26	–	28	.481
BYU ‍‍‍	7	–	23	.233	21	–	31	.404
† – Conference champion ‡ – Tournament champion y – Invited to the NCAA tournament As of June 26, 2024; Rankings from D1baseball

The 2024 West Virginia Mountaineers baseball team represented West Virginia University during the 2024 NCAA Division I baseball season. The Mountaineers played their home games at Kendrick Family Ballpark as a member of the Big 12 Conference. They were led by head coach Randy Mazey, in his 12th season at West Virginia.

== Previous season ==
The 2023 West Virginia Mountaineers baseball team had one of the most successful campaigns in program history. Led by head coach Randy Mazey in his 11th season and earning a share of the Big 12 regular season title—the first in school history since joining the conference in 2013.

West Virginia spent much of the season ranked in the national polls and reached as high as No. 6 in several major rankings, marking the program’s highest placement in modern polling history. The team qualified for the 2023 NCAA Division I baseball tournament and was selected as a No. 2 seed in the Lexington Regional, hosted by the 2023 Kentucky Wildcats baseball team. However, West Virginia was eliminated after going 1-2 in the regional finishing with a 40–20 overall record.

== Personnel ==
Lineup
Pos.	No.	Player.	Year
C	33	Logan Sauve	SO
1B	9	Grant Hussey	JR
2B	12	Brodie Kresser	JR
3B	13	Reed Chumley	JR
SS	27	JJ Wetherholt	JR
LF	11	Sam White	SO
CF	6	Skylar King	SO
RF	37	Ben Lumsden	SO
DH	39	Kyle West	JR

=== Roster ===
2024 West Virginia Mountaineers baseball team
Players
Coaches

#	Pos.	Name	B/T	Height	Weight	Year	Home town
1	RHP	JJ Glasscock	R/R	6 ft 0 in (1.83 m)	170 lb (77 kg)	Fr	Fluvanna County, Virginia
2	LHP	Derek Clark	L/L	5 ft 9 in (1.75 m)	190 lb (86 kg)	Sr	Petersburg, Michigan
3	LHP	Andrew Callaway	R/L	6 ft 0 in (1.83 m)	210 lb (95 kg)	Fr	Seaford, Delaware
4	OF	Aaron Jamison	L/L	6 ft 0 in (1.83 m)	195 lb (88 kg)	Fr	Morgantown, West Virginia
5	UTL	Armani Guzman	L/R	5 ft 10 in (1.78 m)	205 lb (93 kg)	Fr	New York City, New York
6	OF	Skylar King	L/L	6 ft 1 in (1.85 m)	180 lb (82 kg)	So	Columbia, South Carolina
7	INF	Tony Konopiots	R/R	6 ft 1 in (1.85 m)	200 lb (91 kg)	Fr	Downers Grove, Illinois
8	C	Brody Dalton	L/R	6 ft 5 in (1.96 m)	185 lb (84 kg)	Fr	Chapmanville, West Virginia
9	INF	Grant Hussey	L/R	6 ft 3 in (1.91 m)	225 lb (102 kg)	Jr	Parkersburg, West Virginia
10	RHP	Chase Meyer	R/R	6 ft 2 in (1.88 m)	175 lb (79 kg)	Fr	Daytona Beach, Florida
11	UTL	Sam White	L/R	5 ft 11 in (1.8 m)	195 lb (88 kg)	So	Aurora, Ontario
12	INF	Brodie Kresser	R/R	6 ft 1 in (1.85 m)	180 lb (82 kg)	Jr	Jesup, Iowa
13	INF	Reed Chumley	R/R	6 ft 1 in (1.85 m)	205 lb (93 kg)	Sr	Cypress, Texas
15	LHP	Maxx Yehl	L/L	6 ft 6 in (1.98 m)	235 lb (107 kg)	So	Portville, New York
16	RHP	David Hagaman	R/R	6 ft 4 in (1.93 m)	215 lb (98 kg)	RS So	Egg Harbor City, New Jersey
17	LHP	Joe Fredericks	L/L	5 ft 9 in (1.75 m)	185 lb (84 kg)	Fr	Virginia Beach, Virginia
18	INF	Spencer Barnett	L/R	6 ft 2 in (1.88 m)	205 lb (93 kg)	Fr	Pittsburgh
20	RHP	Luke Lyman	R/R	6 ft 5 in (1.96 m)	212 lb (96 kg)	So	Berryville, Virginia
21	LHP	Cole Fehrman	R/L	6 ft 3 in (1.91 m)	180 lb (82 kg)	So	Doylestown, Pennsylvania
23	INF	Ellis Garcia	R/R	6 ft 0 in (1.83 m)	215 lb (98 kg)	So	Elmwood Park, New Jersey
24	RHP	Aidan Major	L/R	5 ft 11 in (1.8 m)	200 lb (91 kg)	Jr	Mill Hall, Pennsylvania
25	OF	Tyler Cox	L/R	6 ft 0 in (1.83 m)	185 lb (84 kg)	Jr	Westbury, New York
26	INF	Nick Barone	R/R	6 ft 0 in (1.83 m)	175 lb (79 kg)	So	Montoursville, Pennsylvania
27	INF	JJ Wetherholt	L/R	5 ft 10 in (1.78 m)	190 lb (86 kg)	Jr	Mars, Pennsylvania
30	C	Luke Szepek	R/R	6 ft 4 in (1.93 m)	215 lb (98 kg)	Fr	Albany, New York
31	UTL	Alex Marot	R/R	6 ft 2 in (1.88 m)	200 lb (91 kg)	Fr	Johnston, Rhode Island
33	C	Logan Sauve	R/R	5 ft 10 in (1.78 m)	185 lb (84 kg)	So	Boiling Springs, Pennsylvania
35	RHP	Gavin Van Kempen	R/R	6 ft 6 in (1.98 m)	225 lb (102 kg)	So	Castleton, New York
36	RHP	Bryce Amos	R/R	6 ft 5 in (1.96 m)	235 lb (107 kg)	So	Shadyside, Ohio
37	UTL	Ben Lumsden	L/R	6 ft 3 in (1.91 m)	200 lb (91 kg)	So	Simpsonville, South Carolina
38	LHP	Tyler Switalski	R/L	6 ft 4 in (1.93 m)	235 lb (107 kg)	Jr	Waynesburg, Pennsylvania
39	INF	Kyle West	L/R	6 ft 4 in (1.93 m)	195 lb (88 kg)	Jr	Hedgesville, West Virginia
40	RHP	Carson Estridge	L/R	6 ft 7 in (2.01 m)	210 lb (95 kg)	So	Haymarket, Virginia
41	OF	Michael Perazza	L/L	6 ft 3 in (1.91 m)	195 lb (88 kg)	Fr	Naples, Florida
42	RHP	Tommy Beam	R/R	6 ft 7 in (2.01 m)	205 lb (93 kg)	RS So	Gibsonia, Pennsylvania
43	RHP	Robby Porco	R/R	6 ft 8 in (2.03 m)	235 lb (107 kg)	So	Warrington, Pennsylvania
44	OF	Lincoln Pack	R/R	5 ft 8 in (1.73 m)	170 lb (77 kg)	Fr	Mount Morris, Pennsylvania
46	RHP	Hambleton Oliver	L/R	6 ft 2 in (1.88 m)	220 lb (100 kg)	Gr	Corpus Christi, Texas
52	RHP	Aidan Smith	R/R	6 ft 3 in (1.91 m)	215 lb (98 kg)	Fr	Silver Spring, Maryland
54	RHP	Hayden Cooper	R/R	6 ft 3 in (1.91 m)	210 lb (95 kg)	Sr	Richmond Hill, Georgia

=== Coaching staff ===
2024 West Virginia Mountaineers coaching staff
- Randy Mazey - Head coach - 12th overall
- Steve Sabins - Associate Coach/Recruiting Coordinator - 9th year
- Jacob Garcia - Assistant Coach - 5th year
- Jimmy Roesinger - Assistant Coach - 1st year

== Schedule ==
2024 West Virginia Mountaineers baseball game log (36–24)
Legend: = Win = Loss = Canceled Bold = West Virginia team member
Regular season (36–24)

February (5–4)
Date	Time (ET)	TV	Opponent	Rank	Stadium	Score	Win	Loss	Save	Attend	Overall Record	Big 12 Record	Sources
February 16	–	–	at Stetson	–	Melching Field • DeLand, FL	W 6–4	–	–	–	–	1–0	–	Link
February 17	–	–	at Stetson	–	Melching Field • DeLand, FL	L 5–7	–	–	–	–	1–1	–	Link
February 19	–	–	at Stetson	–	Melching Field • DeLand, FL	L 4–5	–	–	–	–	1–2	–	Link
February 19	–	–	at Stetson	–	Melching Field • DeLand, FL	W 7–5	–	–	–	–	2–2	–	Link
February 23	–	–	at Charlotte	–	Robert & Mariam Hayes Stadium • Charlotte, NC	W 12–8	–	–	–	–	3–2	–	Link
February 24	–	–	at Charlotte	–	Robert & Mariam Hayes Stadium • Charlotte, NC	W 8–1	–	–	–	–	4–2	–	Link
February 24	–	–	at Charlotte	–	Robert & Mariam Hayes Stadium • Charlotte, NC	L 2–3	–	–	–	–	4–3	–	Link
February 25	–	–	at Charlotte	–	Robert & Mariam Hayes Stadium • Charlotte, NC	L 5–6	–	–	–	–	4–4	–	Link
February 28	–	–	Canisius	–	Kendrick Family Ballpark • Morgantown, WV	W 10–3	–	–	–	–	5–4	–	Link
* indicates a non-conference game. All rankings from D1 Baseball Poll on the date of the contest.

March (11–7)
Date	Time (ET)	TV	Opponent	Rank	Stadium	Score	Win	Loss	Save	Attend	Overall Record	Big 12 Record	Sources
March 1	–	–	at Western Kentucky	–	Nick Denes Field • Bowling Green, KY	W 4–0	**Watkins**	–	**Waters**	–	6–4	–	Link
March 2	–	–	at Western Kentucky	–	Nick Denes Field • Bowling Green, KY	W 8–3	**Reed**	–	–	–	7–4	–	Link
March 2	–	–	at Western Kentucky	–	Nick Denes Field • Bowling Green, KY	L 6–7	–	**Watkins**	–	–	7–5	–	Link
March 3	–	–	at Western Kentucky	–	Nick Denes Field • Bowling Green, KY	L 3–4	–	–	–	–	7–6	–	Link
March 7	–	–	BYU	–	Kendrick Family Ballpark • Morgantown, WV	W 10–4	**Watkins**	–	–	–	8–6	–	Link
March 8	–	–	BYU	–	Kendrick Family Ballpark • Morgantown, WV	L 1–4	–	**Reed**	–	–	8–7	–	Link
March 8	–	–	BYU	–	Kendrick Family Ballpark • Morgantown, WV	W 2–0	**Watkins**	–	**Waters**	–	9–7	–	Link
March 12	–	–	vs. Marshall	–	GoMart Ballpark • Charleston, WV	W 11–2	**Reed**	–	–	–	10–7	–	Link
March 15	–	–	Ohio State	–	Kendrick Family Ballpark • Morgantown, WV	W 5–2	**Watkins**	–	**Waters**	–	11–7	–	Link
March 16	–	–	Ohio State	–	Kendrick Family Ballpark • Morgantown, WV	L 4–7	–	**Reed**	–	–	11–8	–	Link
March 17	–	–	Ohio State	–	Kendrick Family Ballpark • Morgantown, WV	L 11–26	–	–	–	–	11–9	–	Link
March 20	–	–	Marshall	–	Kendrick Family Ballpark • Morgantown, WV	W 15–0	**Watkins**	–	–	–	12–9	–	Link
March 22	–	–	at Oklahoma	–	L. Dale Mitchell Park • Norman, OK	L 0–13	–	**Reed**	–	–	12–10	0–1	Link
March 23	–	–	at Oklahoma	–	L. Dale Mitchell Park • Norman, OK	W 9–5	**Watkins**	–	–	–	13–10	1–1	Link
March 23	–	–	at Oklahoma	–	L. Dale Mitchell Park • Norman, OK	W 8–3	**Reed**	–	–	–	14–10	2–1	Link
March 26	–	–	Akron	–	Kendrick Family Ballpark • Morgantown, WV	W 6–2	**Watkins**	–	–	–	15–10	2–1	Link
March 29	–	–	Oklahoma State	–	Kendrick Family Ballpark • Morgantown, WV	L 1–2	–	**Reed**	–	–	15–11	2–2	Link
March 30	–	–	Oklahoma State	–	Kendrick Family Ballpark • Morgantown, WV	L 1–10	–	–	–	–	15–12	2–3	Link
March 31	–	–	Oklahoma State	–	Kendrick Family Ballpark • Morgantown, WV	W 15–10	**Watkins**	–	–	–	16–12	3–3	Link
* indicates a non-conference game. All rankings from D1 Baseball Poll on the date of the contest.

April (12–7)
Date	Time (ET)	TV	Opponent	Rank	Stadium	Score	Win	Loss	Save	Attend	Overall Record	Big 12 Record	Sources
April 5			at Kansas *		• Lawrence, KS	W 11–10					16–13	5–5	
April 6			at Kansas *		• Lawrence, KS	W 4-0					17–13	6–5	
April 7			at Kansas *		• Lawrence, KS	W 16-9					18–13	7–5	
April 9			at Marshall		Jack Cook Field • Huntington, WV	L 2-3					19–13	7–5	
April 12			UCF *		Kendrick Family Ballpark • Morgantown, WV	L 4–7					19–14	7–6	
April 13			UCF *		Kendrick Family Ballpark • Morgantown, WV	W 9–6					20–14	8–6	
April 14			UCF *		Kendrick Family Ballpark • Morgantown, WV	W 5–3					21–14	9–6	
April 16			Pitt		Kendrick Family Ballpark • Morgantown, WV	L 4–9					21–15	9–6	
April 19			at TCU *		Lupton Stadium • Fort Worth, TX	W 5–4					22–15	10–6	
April 20			at TCU *		Lupton Stadium • Fort Worth, TX	W 3–2					23–15	11–6	
April 21			at TCU *		Lupton Stadium • Fort Worth, TX	L 1–4					23–16	11–7	
April 23			Penn State		Kendrick Family Ballpark • Morgantown, WV	W 6–5					24–16	11–7	
April 26			Texas *		Kendrick Family Ballpark • Morgantown, WV	W 7–6					25–16	12–7	
April 27			Texas *		Kendrick Family Ballpark • Morgantown, WV	W 6–3					26–16	13–7	
April 28			Texas *		Kendrick Family Ballpark • Morgantown, WV	L 4–9					26–17	13–8	
* indicates a Big 12 Conference game. Rankings are from the D1Baseball poll on game day.

May (6–3)
Date	Time (ET)	TV	Opponent	Rank	Stadium	Score	Win	Loss	Save	Attend	Overall Record	Big 12 Record	Sources
May 3			at Cincinnati *		UC Baseball Stadium • Cincinnati, OH	W 5–4					30–18	17–12	WVU
May 4			at Cincinnati *		UC Baseball Stadium • Cincinnati, OH	L 4–10					30–19	17–13	
May 5			at Cincinnati *		UC Baseball Stadium • Cincinnati, OH	L 2–8					30–20	17–14	
May 8			Penn State		Kendrick Family Ballpark • Morgantown, WV	W 18–7					31–20	17–14	
May 10			Kansas State *		Kendrick Family Ballpark • Morgantown, WV	L 3–4					31–21	17–15	
May 11			Kansas State *		Kendrick Family Ballpark • Morgantown, WV	W 13–0					32–21	18–15	
May 12			Kansas State *		Kendrick Family Ballpark • Morgantown, WV	W 12–5					33–21	19–15	
May 16			at TCU *		Lupton Stadium • Fort Worth, TX	L 3–6					33–22	19–16	
May 17			at TCU *		Lupton Stadium • Fort Worth, TX	W 7–2					34–22	20–16	
May 18			at TCU *		Lupton Stadium • Fort Worth, TX	W 6–5					35–22	21–16	
* indicates a Big 12 regular season game.

Postseason (3–4)

Big 12 Tournament (0–2)
Date	Time (ET)	TV	Opponent	Rank	Stadium	Score	Win	Loss	Save	Attend	Overall Record	Big 12 Record	Sources
May 21			vs. TCU		Globe Life Field • Arlington, TX	L 2–5					34–21		
May 22			vs. Kansas State		Globe Life Field • Arlington, TX	L 4–8					34–22		
Games played as part of the 2024 Phillips 66 Big 12 Baseball Championship.

NCAA Tournament: Tucson Regional (3-0)
Date	Time (ET)	TV	Opponent	Rank	Stadium	Score	Win	Loss	Save	Attend	Overall Record	Big 12 Record	Sources
May 31			vs. Dallas Baptist		Hi Corbett Field • Tucson, AZ	W 4–1					34–22		WVU
June 1			vs. Grand Canyon		Hi Corbett Field • Tucson, AZ	W 5–2					35–22		
June 2			vs. Grand Canyon		Hi Corbett Field • Tucson, AZ	W 10–6					36–22		
Games played as part of the 2024 NCAA Division I Baseball Championship – Tucson Regional.

NCAA Tournament: Chapel Hill Super Regional (0–2)
Date	Time (ET)	TV	Opponent	Rank	Stadium	Score	Win	Loss	Save	Attend	Overall Record	Big 12 Record	Sources
June 7			at North Carolina		Boshamer Stadium • Chapel Hill, NC	L 6–8					36–23		WVU
June 8			at North Carolina		Boshamer Stadium • Chapel Hill, NC	L 1–2					36–24		
Games played as part of the 2024 NCAA Division I Baseball Championship – Super Regional.

== Rankings ==
Ranking movements Legend: ██ Increase in ranking ██ Decrease in ranking — = Not ranked RV = Received votes
	Week																	
Poll	Pre	1	2	3	4	5	6	7	8	9	10	11	12	13	14	15	16	Final
Coaches'	RV	RV*	—	—	—	—	—	—	RV	24	RV	RV	—	RV	—	RV	RV	17
Baseball America	—	—	—	—	—	—	—	—	—	18	21	20	—	—	—	—	—	13
NCBWA†	RV	RV	RV	—	—	—	RV	—	RV	RV	RV	RV	RV	RV	RV	RV	12	13
D1Baseball	—	—	—	—	—	—	—	—	—	22	—	—	—	—	—	—	—	13
Perfect Game	—	—	—	—	—	—	—	—	—	21	—	—	—	—	—	—	13	15

† NCBWA ranks 30 teams in their preseason poll, but only ranks 25 teams weekly during the season.
* A new poll was not released for this week, so for comparison purposes, the previous week's ranking is inserted in this week's slot.

== Postseason ==
=== 2024 Big 12 Conference Tournament ===
First round Tuesday May 21; Wednesday May 22
**7**	**Kansas**	**2**
6	Kansas State	1
**9**	**TCU**	**5**
4	West Virginia	2
**6**	**Kansas State**	**8**
4	West Virginia	4
**8**	**UCF**	**6^{(11)}**
5	Cincinnati	5
**10**	**Texas Tech**	**6**
3	Texas	4
**5**	**Cincinnati**	**8**
3	Texas	7

Second round Wednesday May 22; Thursday May 23
**1**	**Oklahoma**	**4**
9	TCU	0
6	Kansas State	4
**9**	**TCU**	**9**
**2**	**Oklahoma State**	**7**
10	Texas Tech	2
5	Cincinnati	5
**10**	**Texas Tech**	**10**

Third round Thursday May 23; Friday May 24
**1**	**Oklahoma**	**7**
7	Kansas	5
9	TCU	10
**7**	**Kansas**	**11**
2	Oklahoma State	6
**8**	**UCF**	**7^{(10)}**
**2**	**Oklahoma State**	**4**
10	Texas Tech	0

Semifinals; Friday May 24
**1**	**Oklahoma**	**8**
7	Kansas	6
8	UCF	1
**2**	**Oklahoma State**	**10**

Finals; Saturday May 25
1	Oklahoma	3
**2**	**Oklahoma State**	**9**

=== NCAA Tournament ===
==== Tucson Regional - Chapel Hill Super Regional ====
Bold indicates winner. Seeds for regional tournaments indicate seeds within regional. Seeds for super regional tournaments indicate national seeds only.

Regional	Regional
1	Arizona	4
4	**Grand Canyon**	**9**
4	Grand Canyon	2
3	**West Virginia**	**5**
3	**West Virginia**	**4**
2	Dallas Baptist	1
Tucson Regional – Hi Corbett Field
1	Arizona	0
2	**Dallas Baptist**	7
4	**Grand Canyon**	12
2	Dallas Baptist	10
1	**North Carolina**	**11**
4	LIU	8
1	**North Carolina**	**6**
2	LSU	2
3	Wofford	3
2	**LSU**	**4**
Chapel Hill Regional – Boshamer Stadium
4	LIU	2
3	**Wofford**	**5**
2	**LSU**	**13**
3	Wofford	6

Regional Final
3	**West Virginia**	**10**	–
4	Grand Canyon	6	–
1	**North Carolina**	4	**4^{10}**
2	LSU	**8**	3

Super Regional
West Virginia	6	1	–
4	**North Carolina**	**8**	**2**	–
