= 2024 TCU Horned Frogs baseball team =

College Baseball Season

2024 TCU Horned Frogs baseball
- Conference: Big 12 Conference
- Record: 33-21 (14–16 Big 12)
- Head coach: Kirk Saarloos (3rd as head coach, 12th overall season)
- Assistant coaches: T. J. Bruce (2nd season); John DiLaura (6th season); Dave Lawn (1st season)
- Home stadium: Lupton Stadium

2024 Big 12 Conference baseball standings
	Conf.				Overall
Team	W		L	PCT	W		L	PCT
No. 18 Oklahoma ‍†‍‍^{y}	23	–	7	.767	40	–	21	.656
No. 21 Oklahoma State ‍‍‡‍^{y}	19	–	9	.679	42	–	19	.689
Texas ‍‍‍^{y}	20	–	10	.667	36	–	24	.600
No. 13 West Virginia ‍‍‍^{y}	19	–	11	.633	36	–	24	.600
Cincinnati ‍‍‍	17	–	13	.567	32	–	25	.561
No. 14 Kansas State ‍‍‍^{y}	15	–	15	.500	35	–	26	.574
Kansas ‍‍‍	15	–	15	.500	31	–	23	.574
UCF ‍‍‍^{y}	14	–	15	.483	37	–	21	.638
TCU ‍‍‍	14	–	16	.467	33	–	21	.611
Texas Tech ‍‍‍	12	–	17	.414	33	–	26	.559
Baylor ‍‍‍	10	–	20	.333	22	–	31	.415
Houston ‍‍‍	7	–	21	.250	26	–	28	.481
BYU ‍‍‍	7	–	23	.233	21	–	31	.404
† – Conference champion ‡ – Tournament champion y – Invited to the NCAA tournament As of June 26, 2024; Rankings from D1baseball

The 2024 TCU Horned Frogs baseball team represented Texas Christian University during the 2024 NCAA Division I baseball season. The Horned Frogs played their home games at Lupton Stadium as a member of the Big 12 Conference. They were led by head coach Kirk Saarloos, in his third year as head coach and twelfth season at TCU.

== Previous season ==
The 2023 TCU Horned Frogs baseball team notched a 44-24 (13–11) record. They won the Big 12 tournament and advanced to the College World Series.

== Personnel ==
=== Coaching staff ===
Name	Position	Seasons at TCU	Alma mater
Kirk Saarloos	Head coach	12	Cal State Fullerton (2001)
T. J. Bruce	Associate head coach	2	Long Beach State (2004)
John DiLaura	Assistant Coach	6	Michigan (2013)
Dave Lawn	Assistant coach	1	UC Santa Barbara (1987)

=== Roster ===
2024 TCU Horned Frogs roster
Pitchers: 3 - Caedmon Parker – RS Sophomore; 11 - Ben Hampton – Senior; 12 Ben Abeldt – Sophomore; 17 - Kole Klecker – Sophomore; 18 - Storm Hierholzer – RS Junior; 21 - Zachary Cawyer – Junior; 25 - Jax Traeger – Sophomore; 27 - Carson Cormier – Freshman; 28 - Cohen Feser – Junior; 29 - Mason Bixby – Freshman; 30 - Louis Rodriguez – Sophomore; 31 - Andrew Mosiello - RS Junior; 32 - Braeden Sloan – Sophomore; 33 - Zack Morris – RS Senior; 36 - Chase Hoover – Sophomore; 38 - Colt Taylor – RS Senior; 41 - Holden Harris – Freshman; 43 - Jax Lewis – Freshman; 44 - Hunter Hodges – Senior; 47 - Blake Rogers – RS Freshman; 61 - Kyle Ayers – Junior	Catchers: 4 - Kurtis Byrne – Senior; 14 - Karson Bowen – Sophomore; 34 - Dallen Leach – RS Senior; 37 - Tim Reynolds – Sophomore; Infielders: 0 - Ryder Robinson – Freshman; 1 - Peyton Chatagnier – RS Senior; 5 - Anthony Silva – Sophomore; 7 - Gabe Miranda – RS Freshman; 8 - Jack Basseer – Sophomore; 9 - Brody Green – Junior; 16 - Micah Kendrick – Freshman; 23 - Fisher Ingersoll – Sophomore; 26 - Cameron Sos – Freshman; 35 - Zach Wadas - Freshman; 49 - Payton Tolle – Junior	Outfielders: 6 - Luke Boyers – Senior; 10 - Jake Duer – Sophomore; 13 - Sam Myers – Freshman; 15 - Chase Brunson – Freshman; 20 - Jack Arthur – RS Sophomore; 22 - Logan Maxwell – Junior

== Schedule and results ==
2024 TCU Horned Frogs baseball game log
Regular season (20–8)
February (9–0)

Date	Time (CT)	TV	Opponent	Rank	Stadium	Score	Win	Loss	Save	Attendance	Overall	Big 12	
Feb 16	6:30 pm	ESPN+	Florida Gulf Coast*	No. 5	Lupton Stadium; Fort Worth, TX	**W** 10–9	**Cawyer** (1–0)	Hartman (0–1)	—	4,568	1–0	—	Stats; Story
Feb 17	2:00 pm	ESPN+	Florida Gulf Coast*	No. 5	Lupton Stadium; Fort Worth, TX	**W** 13–10	**Sloan** (1–0)	Dempsey (0–1)	**Abeldt** (1)	4,029	2–0	—	Stats; Story
Feb 18	12:30 pm	ESPN+	Florida Gulf Coast*	No. 5	Lupton Stadium; Fort Worth, TX	**W** 13–10	**Cawyer** (2–0)	Love (0–1)	**Hodges** (1)	4,052	3-0	—	Stats; Story
Feb 20	6:00 pm	ESPN+	Texas State*	No. 5	Lupton Stadium; Fort Worth, TX	**W** 6–5	**Rodriguez** (1–0)	Robie (0–1)	**Abeldt** (2)	4,412	4-0	—	Stats; Story
Feb 23	6:30 pm	ESPN+	vs. No. 20 UCLA*	No. 5	Lupton Stadium; Fort Worth, TX	**W** 4–3	**Tolle** (1–0)	Jewett (0–1)	**Abeldt** (3)	5,004	5-0	—	Stats; Story
Feb 24	4:00 pm	ESPN+	vs. No. 20 UCLA*	No. 5	Lupton Stadium; Fort Worth, TX	**W** 6–3	**Sloan** (2–0)	McIlroy (1–1)	**Hoover** (1)	5,278	6-0	—	Stats; Story
Feb 25	1:00 pm	ESPN+	vs. No. 20 UCLA*	No. 5	Lupton Stadium; Fort Worth, TX	**W** 13–3^{(7)}	**Morris** (1–0)	Barnett (1–1)	—	4,825	7-0	—	Stats; Story
Feb 27	6:00 pm	ESPN+	Washington State*	No. 5	Lupton Stadium; Fort Worth, TX	**W** 8–7^{(12)}	**Cawyer** (3–0)	Baughn (0–1)	—	3,987	8-0	—	Stats; Story
Feb 28	6:00 pm	ESPN+	Arizona*	No. 5	Lupton Stadium; Fort Worth, TX	**W** 6–1	**Sloan** (3–0)	Garayzar (0–2)	—	3,701	9-0	—	Stats; Story

March (11–7)

Date	Time (CT)	TV	Opponent	Rank	Stadium	Score	Win	Loss	Save	Attendance	Overall	Big 12	
Mar 1	2:00 pm	FloSports	USC*	No. 5	Globe Life Field; Arlington, TX	**W** 9–8^{(11)}	**Ayers** (1–0)	Ryhlick (0–1)	—		10-0	—	Stats; Story
Mar 2	6:00 pm	FloSports	Arizona State*	No. 5	Globe Life Field; Arlington, TX	**W** 11–9	**Cawyer** (4–0)	Behrens (2–1)	—	10,547	11-0	—	Stats; Story
Mar 3	3:00 pm	FloSports	USC*	No. 5	Globe Life Field; Arlington, TX	**W** 9–5	**Hierholzer** (1–0)	Hammond (0–2)	—	6,516	12-0	—	Stats; Story
Mar 5	6:00 pm	ESPN+	Abilene Christian*	No.5	Lupton Stadium; Fort Worth, TX	**W** 4-0	**Parker** (1–0)	McGarrh (2–1)	—	4,344	13-0	—	Stats; Story
Mar 8	6:00 pm	ESPN+	at Kansas	No. 5	Hoglund Ballpark; Lawrence, KS	**L** 1-3	Reese (3–1)	**Tolle** (1–1)	Cranton (1)	564	13-1	0-1	Stats; Story
Mar 9	2:00 pm	ESPN+	at Kansas	No. 5	Hoglund Ballpark; Lawrence, KS	**L** 4-8	Voegele (2–0)	**Klecker** (0–1)	—	908	13-2	0-2	Stats; Story
Mar 10	1:00 pm	ESPN+	at Kansas	No. 5	Hoglund Ballpark; Lawrence, KS	**W** 13-4	**Cawyer** (5–0)	Moore (0–1)	—	1,110	14-2	1-2	Stats; Story
Mar 12	6:30 pm	ESPN+	at No. 19 Dallas Baptist*	No. 12	Horner Ballpark; Dallas, TX	**W** 9-6	**Rodriguez** (2–0)	Benge (1–1)	—	2,213	15-2	—	Stats; Story
Mar 15	6:30 pm	ESPN+	Oklahoma	No. 12	Lupton Stadium; Fort Worth, TX	**L** 3-7	K. Witherspoon (2–1)	**Cawyer** (5–1)	—	4,547	15-3	1-3	Stats; Story
Mar 16	5:00 pm	ESPN+	Oklahoma	No. 12	Lupton Stadium; Fort Worth, TX	**L** 5-7	M. Witherspoon (1–1)	**Morris** (1–1)	—	4,224	15-4	1-4	Stats; Story
Mar 17	1:00 pm	ESPN+	Oklahoma	No. 12	Lupton Stadium; Fort Worth, TX	**L** 4-9	Hitt (2–1)	**Sloan** (3–1)	—	4,500	15-5	1-5	Stats; Story
Mar 19	6:00 pm	ESPN+	UT Arlington*	No. 18	Lupton Stadium; Fort Worth, TX	**W** 7-3	**Bixby** (1–0)	Wallace (0–5)	—	4,307	16-5	—	Stats; Story
Mar 22	6:00 pm	ESPN+	at Oklahoma State	No. 18	O'Brate Stadium; Stillwater, OK	**W** 1-0	**Tolle** (2–1)	Garcia (2–3)	—	4,979	17-5	2-5	Stats; Story
Mar 23	6:00 pm	ESPN+	at Oklahoma State	No. 18	O'Brate Stadium; Stillwater, OK	**L** 2-6	Holiday (2–1)	**Klecker** (0–2)	—	5,309	17-6	2-6	Stats; Story
Mar 24	1:00 pm	ESPN+	at Oklahoma State	No. 18	O'Brate Stadium; Stillwater, OK	**L** 3-6	Molsky (3–0)	**Sloan** (3–2)	—	4,184	17-7	2-7	Stats; Story
Mar 28	6:00 pm	ESPN+	Houston		Lupton Stadium; Fort Worth, TX	**W** 14-1	**Rodriguez** (3–0)	Jean (2–2)	—	3,875	18-7	3-7	Stats; Story
Mar 29	6:30 pm	ESPN+	Houston		Lupton Stadium; Fort Worth, TX	**W** 6-2	**Tolle** (3–1)	LaCalameto (2–1)	—	4,251	19-7	4-7	Stats; Story
Mar 30	2:00 pm	ESPN+	Houston		Lupton Stadium; Fort Worth, TX	**W** 6-4	**Abeldt** (1–0)	Stuart (2–2)	**Cawyer** (1)	4,668	20-7	5-7	Stats; Story

April (0–1)

Date	Time (CT)	TV	Opponent	Rank	Stadium	Score	Win	Loss	Save	Attendance	Overall	Big 12	
Apr 2	6:00 pm		at UT Arlington*		Clay Gould Ballpark; Arlington, TX	**L** 4-6	Wallace (1–5)	**Mosiello** (0–1)	Steeber (2)	592	20-8	—	Stats; Story
Apr 5	4:00 pm	ESPN+	at Cincinnati		UC Baseball Stadium; Cincinnati, OH								
Apr 6	1:00 pm	ESPN+	at Cincinnati		UC Baseball Stadium; Cincinnati, OH								
Apr 7	11:00 am	ESPN+	at Cincinnati		UC Baseball Stadium; Cincinnati, OH								
Apr 9	6:00 pm	ESPN+	UT Rio Grande Valley*		Lupton Stadium; Fort Worth, TX							—	
Apr 10	6:00 pm	ESPN+	UT Rio Grande Valley*		Lupton Stadium; Fort Worth, TX							—	
Apr 12	6:30 pm	ESPN+	Texas Tech		Lupton Stadium; Fort Worth, TX								
Apr 13	3:00 pm	ESPNU	Texas Tech		Lupton Stadium; Fort Worth, TX								
Apr 14	1:00 pm	ESPN+	Texas Tech		Lupton Stadium; Fort Worth, TX								
Apr 16	6:05 pm	ESPN+	at Abilene Christian*		Crutcher Scott Field; Abilene, TX							—	
Apr 19	6:30 pm	ESPNU	at Texas		Disch-Falk Field; Austin, TX								
Apr 20	6:00 pm	ESPNU	at Texas		Disch-Falk Field; Austin, TX								
Apr 21	1:00 pm	LHN	at Texas		Disch-Falk Field; Austin, TX								
Apr 23	6:00 pm	ESPN+	Dallas Baptist*		Lupton Stadium; Fort Worth, TX							—	
Apr 26	6:30 pm	ESPNU	Kansas State		Lupton Stadium; Fort Worth, TX								
Apr 27	4:00 pm	ESPNU	Kansas State		Lupton Stadium; Fort Worth, TX								
Apr 28	1:00 pm	ESPNU	Kansas State		Lupton Stadium; Fort Worth, TX								

May (0–0)

Date	Time (CT)	TV	Opponent	Rank	Stadium	Score	Win	Loss	Save	Attendance	Overall	Big 12
May 3	6:00 pm	ESPN+	at Baylor		Baylor Ballpark; Waco, TX							
May 4	2:00 pm	ESPN+	at Baylor		Baylor Ballpark; Waco, TX							
May 5	1:00 pm	ESPN+	at Baylor		Baylor Ballpark; Waco, TX							
May 10	6:00 pm	ESPN+	New Mexico State*		Lupton Stadium; Fort Worth, TX							—
May 11	4:00 pm	ESPN+	New Mexico State*		Lupton Stadium; Fort Worth, TX							—
May 12	1:00 pm	ESPN+	New Mexico State*		Lupton Stadium; Fort Worth, TX							—
May 14	6:00 pm	ESPN+	Baylor*		Lupton Stadium; Fort Worth, TX							
May 16	6:00 pm	ESPN+	West Virginia		Lupton Stadium; Fort Worth, TX							
May 17	6:30 pm	ESPN+	West Virginia		Lupton Stadium; Fort Worth, TX							
May 18	4:00 pm	ESPN+	West Virginia		Lupton Stadium; Fort Worth, TX							

Legend: = Win = Loss = Canceled Bold = TCU team member
"*" indicates a non-conference game.
"#" represents ranking. All rankings from D1Baseball on the date of the contest.
"()" represents postseason seeding in the Big 12 Tournament or NCAA regional, respectively.

== Rankings ==
Ranking movements
	Week																			
Poll	Pre	1	2	3	4	5	6	7	8	9	10	11	12	13	14	15	16	17	18	Final
Coaches'		*																		
Baseball America																				
NCBWA†																				

† NCBWA ranks 30 teams in their preseason poll, but only ranks 25 teams weekly during the season.
* A new poll was not released for this week, so for comparison purposes, the previous week's ranking is inserted in this week's slot.
