= 2024 UCF Knights baseball team =

College baseball season

2024 UCF Knights baseball

Tallahassee Regional, 2–2
- Conference: Big 12 Conference
- Record: 37–21 (14–15 Big 12)
- Head coach: Rich Wallace (1st season)
- Assistant coaches: Norberto Lopez; Drew Thomas; Ted Tom
- Home stadium: John Euliano Park

2024 Big 12 Conference baseball standings
	Conf.				Overall
Team	W		L	PCT	W		L	PCT
No. 18 Oklahoma ‍†‍‍^{y}	23	–	7	.767	40	–	21	.656
No. 21 Oklahoma State ‍‍‡‍^{y}	19	–	9	.679	42	–	19	.689
Texas ‍‍‍^{y}	20	–	10	.667	36	–	24	.600
No. 13 West Virginia ‍‍‍^{y}	19	–	11	.633	36	–	24	.600
Cincinnati ‍‍‍	17	–	13	.567	32	–	25	.561
No. 14 Kansas State ‍‍‍^{y}	15	–	15	.500	35	–	26	.574
Kansas ‍‍‍	15	–	15	.500	31	–	23	.574
UCF ‍‍‍^{y}	14	–	15	.483	37	–	21	.638
TCU ‍‍‍	14	–	16	.467	33	–	21	.611
Texas Tech ‍‍‍	12	–	17	.414	33	–	26	.559
Baylor ‍‍‍	10	–	20	.333	22	–	31	.415
Houston ‍‍‍	7	–	21	.250	26	–	28	.481
BYU ‍‍‍	7	–	23	.233	21	–	31	.404
† – Conference champion ‡ – Tournament champion y – Invited to the NCAA tournament As of June 26, 2024; Rankings from D1baseball

The 2024 UCF Knights baseball team represented the University of Central Florida (UCF) in the sport of baseball during the 2024 college baseball season. This was the Knights' first season as members of the Big 12 Conference. Home games were played at John Euliano Park on the university's main campus in Orlando, Florida. The team was coached by Rich Wallace in his first season as UCF's head coach.

== Preseason ==
=== Big 12 coaches poll ===
The Big 12 Conference preseason poll was released on January 25, 2024, with the Knights predicted to finish in tenth place.

Coaches Poll
Rank	School (1st Place Votes)	Total
1	TCU (11)	143
2	Texas (2)	131
3	Oklahoma State	119
4	Texas Tech	107
5	Kansas State	98
T6	Oklahoma	85
T6	West Virginia	85
8	Kansas	67
9	Houston	56
10	UCF	45
11	Baylor	36
T12	BYU	21
T12	Cincinnati	21

== Schedule ==
Legend
	UCF win
	UCF loss
	Postponement
**Bold**	UCF team member

2024 UCF Knights baseball game log
Regular season

February (6–0)
Date	Opponent	Stadium Site	Score	Win	Loss	Save	Attendance	Overall Record
February 16	Bryant	John Euliano Park; Orlando, FL	**W** 12–11	**A. Galvan** (1–0)	J. Burrows (0–1)	**C. Centala** (1)	2,602	1–0
February 17	Bryant	John Euliano Park		**No Contest**				1–0
February 18	Bryant	John Euliano Park		**Cancelled**				1–0
February 21	at Miami	Alex Rodriguez Park; Coral Gables, FL	**W** 4–3	**K. Kramer** (1–0)	B. Chestnutt (0–1)	**C. Centala** (2)	2,400	2–0
February 23	Samford	John Euliano Park	**W** 18–3^{7}	**B. Vespi** (1–0)	B. Rice (1–1)	None	1,812	3–0
February 24	Samford	John Euliano Park	**W** 9–6	**A. Galvan** (2–0)	J. Holifield (1–1)	**C. Centala** (3)	2,487	4–0
February 25	Samford	John Euliano Park	**W** 12–2^{7}	**D. Stagliano** (1–0)	W. Lynch (0–1)	None	2,154	5–0
February 27	at Florida Atlantic	FAU Baseball Stadium; Boca Raton, FL	**W** 11–6	**C. Boxrucker** (1–0)	B. Ostrander (0–2)	None	522	6–0

March (12–7)
Date	Opponent	Stadium Site	Score	Win	Loss	Save	Attendance	Overall Record	Big 12 Record
March 1	South Florida	John Euliano Park	**W** 3–2^{10}	**C. Centala** (1–0)	B. Archie (0–1)	None	2,150	7–0	–
March 2	South Florida	John Euliano Park	**L** 5–7	J. Volini (1–0)	**N. Victor** (0–1)	C. Dorsey (1)	2,812	7–1	–
March 3	South Florida	John Euliano Park	**W** 1–0	**K. Kramer** (2–0)	M. Brown (1–1)	**C. Centala** (4)	2,400	8–1	–
March 6	at Florida	Condron Ballpark; Gainesville, FL	**W** 9–6	**D. Castellano** (2–0)	L. McNeillie (1–2)	**K. Kramer** (1)	5,330	9–1	–
March 8	at Oklahoma	L. Dale Mitchell Park; Norman, OK	**L** 3–4	M. Witherspoon (1–1)	**W. Hartley** (0–1)	K. Witherspoon (1)	1,569	9–2	0–1
March 9	at Oklahoma	L. Dale Mitchell Park	**L** 3–11	G. Stevens (2–0)	**T. Nesbitt** (0–1)	None	1,673	9–3	0–2
March 10	at Oklahoma	L. Dale Mitchell Park	**L** 2–14^{7}	J. Hitt (1–1)	**D. Stagliano** (0–1)	None	1,621	9–4	0–3
March 13	Stetson	John Euliano Park	**W** 7–1	**W. Hartley** (1–1)	J. Modugno (0–1)	None	1,569	10–4	–
March 15	Oklahoma State	John Euliano Park	**W** 13–2	**B. Vespi** (2–0)	S. Garcia (2–2)	None	2,256	11–4	1–3
March 16	Oklahoma State	John Euliano Park	**W** 4–3	**C. Centala** (2–0)	G. Davis (1–1)	None	2,189	12–4	2–3
March 17	Oklahoma State	John Euliano Park	**L** 10–16	T. Molsky (2–0)	**C. Boxrucker** (1–1)	None	1,746	12–5	2–4
March 19	Florida Atlantic	John Euliano Park	**W** 3–2	**C. Centala** (3–0)	D. Trehey (1–1)	None	1,811	13–5	–
March 22	at Kansas	Hoglund Ballpark; Lawrence, KS	**L** 3–13	R. Dutton (5–1)	**B. Vespi** (2–1)	None	654	13–6	2–5
March 23	at Kansas	Hoglund Ballpark	**W** 6–2	**K. Kramer** (3–0)	T. Cain (0–2)	**C. Centala** (5)	323	14–6	3–5
March 23	at Kansas	Hoglund Ballpark	**W** 4–1	**W. Hartley** (2–1)	G. Brasosky (1–1)	**D. Castellano** (1)	705	15–6	4–5
March 26	at Jacksonville	John Sessions Stadium; Jacksonville, FL	**W** 4–1	**C. Boxrucker** (2–1)	B. Barquin (0–2)	None	244	16–6	–
March 28	Texas Tech	John Euliano Park	**W** 5–4	**K. Kramer** (4–0)	J. Sanders (1–1)	None	1,908	17–6	5–5
March 29	Texas Tech	John Euliano Park	**W** 2–1	**D. Stagliano** (1–1)	K. Robinson (3–3)	**C. Centala** (6)	2,106	18–6	6–5
March 30	Texas Tech	John Euliano Park	**L** 2–3	M. Heuer (3–2)	**W. Hartley** (2–2)	C. Kaase (1)	2,024	18–7	6–6

April (9–8)
Date	Opponent	Rank	Stadium Site	Score	Win	Loss	Save	Attendance	Overall Record	Big 12 Record
April 2	at Bethune–Cookman	No. 20	Jackie Robinson Ballpark; Daytona Beach, FL	**W** 14–1	**C. Boxrucker** (3–1)	C. Lipovsky (0–1)	None	263	19–7	–
April 5	Kansas State	No. 20	John Euliano Park	**W** 7–4	**K. Kramer** (5–0)	J. Frost (2–1)	**C. Centala** (7)	2,109	20–7	7–6
April 6	Kansas State	No. 20	John Euliano Park	**L** 3–4	O. Boerema (3–2)	**D. Stagliano** (1–2)	T. Neighbors (2)	2,185	20–8	7–7
April 7	Kansas State	No. 20	John Euliano Park	**W** 6–1	**D. Castellano** (3–0)	B. Dean (2–3)	None	1,847	21–8	8–7
April 10	at Stetson	No. 17	Melching Field at Conrad Park; DeLand, FL	**L** 3–5	D. Jacobs (1–1)	**K. Kramer** (5–1)	B. Walker (1)	1,473	21–9	–
April 12	at West Virginia	No. 17	Monongalia County Ballpark; Granville, WV	**L** 6–7	C. Estridge (1–1)	**K. Kramer** (5–2)	D. Hagaman (2)	2,259	21–10	8–8
April 13	at West Virginia	No. 17	Monongalia County Ballpark	**L** 5–7	D. Clark (4–0)	**D. Stagliano** (1–3)	None	3,913	21–11	8–9
April 14	at West Virginia	No. 17	Monongalia County Ballpark	**L** 10–11^{11}	V. Kempen (6–1)	**S. Bauer** (0–1)	None	3,451	21–12	8–10
April 16	North Florida		John Euliano Park	**W** 10–3	**T. Nesbitt** (1–1)	J. Wimpelberg (1–3)	None	1,622	22–12	–
April 19	Central Michigan		John Euliano Park	**L** 0–2	B. Vitas (2–4)	**B. Vespi** (2–2)	None	1,759	22–13	–
April 20	Central Michigan		John Euliano Park	**W** 17–2	**D. Stagliano** (2–3)	T. Miller (1–4)	None	1,725	23–13	–
April 21	Central Michigan		John Euliano Park	**W** 23–3^{7}	**D. Castellano** (4–0)	E. Waters (2–3)	None	2,017	24–13	–
April 23	Florida Gulf Coast		John Euliano Park	**W** 10–3	**S. Bauer** (1–1)	J. Bunz (1–2)	None	1,542	25–13	–
April 26	Cincinnati		John Euliano Park	**L** 4–9	C. Marsh (3–2)	**K. Kramer** (5–3)	None	1,661	25–14	8–11
April 27	Cincinnati		John Euliano Park	**W** 23–3	**D. Castellano** (5–0)	C. Mitchelle (0–3)	None	2,120	26–14	9–11
April 28	Cincinnati		John Euliano Park	**L** 2–8	C. Horst (3–0)	**C. Boxrucker** (3–2)	G. Hugus (2)	1,763	26–15	9–12
April 30	at North Florida		Harmon Stadium; Jacksonville, FL	**W** 6–2	**T. Kozera** (4–2)	C. Boroski (0–3)	**K. Sosnowski** (1)	525	27–15	–

May (6–3)
Date	Opponent	Stadium Site	Score	Win	Loss	Save	Attendance	Overall Record	Big 12 Record
May 3	at Houston	Schroeder Park; Houston, TX	**W** 4–1	**B. Vespi** (3–2)	C. Citelli (3–2)	**D. Castellano** (2)	2,094	28–15	10–12
May 4	at Houston	Schroeder Park	**W** 6–4	**K. Kramer** (6–3)	J. Torrealba (0–1)	**K. Sosnowski** (2)	1,958	29–15	11–12
May 5	at Houston	Schroeder Park	Canceled (rain)						
May 7	North Florida	John Euliano Park	**W** 7–4	**K. Kramer** (7–3)	L. Bolton (0–4)	**K. Sosnowski** (3)	1,486	30–15	–
May 10	Texas	John Euliano Park	**L** 3–6	M. Grubbs (5–4)	**B. Vespi** (3–3)	G. Boehm (6)	1,989	30–16	11–13
May 11	Texas	John Euliano Park	**W** 5–4	**D. Stagliano** (3–3)	A. Whitehead (4–1)	**D. Castellano** (3)	2,141	31–16	12–13
May 12	Texas	John Euliano Park	**L** 7–10	C. Hurley (5–0)	**N. Victor** (0–2)	G. Boehm (7)	1,605	31–17	12–14
May 14	Bethune–Cookman	John Euliano Park	Canceled (rain)						
May 17^{1}	at Baylor	Baylor Ballpark; Waco, TX	**W** 6–4	**B. Vespi** (4–3)	M. Marriott (3–7)	**K. Sosnowski** (4)		32–17	13–14
May 17^{2}	at Baylor	Baylor Ballpark	**L** 2–4	E. Calder (5–3)	**D. Stagliano** (3–4)	A. Petrowski (1)	1,676	32–18	13–15
May 18	at Baylor	Baylor Ballpark	**W** 10–8	**W. Hartley** (3–2)	C. McKinney (3–6)	**K. Sosnowski** (5)	1,613	33–18	14–15

Post-Season

Big 12 Tournament (2–1)
Date	Opponent	Seed	Site/stadium	Score	Win	Loss	Save	TV	Attendance	Overall record	Tournament Record
May 21	vs. (5) Cincinnati	8	Globe Life Field; Arlington, TX	**W** 6-5	**S. Bauer** (2-1)	G. Hugus (0-3)	**K. Kramer** (2)	ESPN+		34–18	1–0
May 23	vs. (2) Oklahoma State	8	Globe Life Field	**W** 10-8	**D. Castellano** (5–0)	G. Davis (1–4)	None	ESPNU	6,791	35–18	2–0
May 24	vs. (2) Oklahoma State	8	Globe Life Field	**L** 1–10	B. Holiday (6–3)	**W. Hartley** (3–3)	None	ESPN+	8,540	35–19	2–1

NCAA tournament: Tallahassee Regional (2–2)
Date	Opponent	Seed	Site/stadium	Score	Win	Loss	Save	TV	Attendance	Overall record	Tournament Record
May 31	vs. (2) Alabama; First round	(3)	Dick Howser Stadium; Tallahassee, FL	**W** 8–7	**K. Sosnowski** (1–0)	A. Davis II (4–2)	None	ESPN+	4,152	36–19	1–0
June 1	vs. (1) No. 8 Florida State; Second round	(3)	Dick Howser Stadium	**L** 2–5	J. Arnold (11–3)	**B. Vespi** (4–4)	B. Oxford (1)	ESPN+	5,246	36–20	1–1
June 2	vs. (4) Stetson; Consolation	(3)	Dick Howser Stadium	**W** 5–2	**D. Castellano** (7–0)	C. Stallings (3–1)	**K. Sosnowski** (1)	ESPN+	4,003	37–20	2–1
June 2	vs. (1) No. 8 Florida State; Regional Final	(3)	Dick Howser Stadium	**L** 4–12	C. Hults (2–1)	**N. Victor** (0–3)	None	ESPN+	4,772	37–21	2–2

Schedule source:

*Rankings are based on the team's current ranking in the D1Baseball poll.

== Rankings ==
Ranking movements Legend: ██ Increase in ranking ██ Decrease in ranking — = Not ranked RV = Received votes
	Week																		
Poll	Pre	1	2	3	4	5	6	7	8	9	10	11	12	13	14	15	16	17	Final
Coaches'	—	—*	—	RV	—	RV	RV	RV	19	RV	RV	—	—	—					
Baseball America	—	—	—	—	—	—	—	—	19	—	—	—	—	—					
NCBWA†	—	—	RV	RV	RV	RV	RV	RV	16	RV	RV	—	RV	RV					
D1Baseball	—	—	—	—	—	—	—	25	17	—	—	—	—	—					
Perfect Game	—	—	—	RV	—	—	RV	20	17	RV	—	—	—	—					

† NCBWA ranks 30 teams in their preseason poll, but only ranks 25 teams weekly during the season.
* A new poll was not released for this week, so for comparison purposes, the previous week's ranking is inserted in this week's slot.
