= Eric Gutierrez =

American baseball player & coach (born 1993)

Current position
- Title: Volunteer assistant coach
- Team: Texas Tech
- Conference: Big 12

Biographical details
- Born: December 28, 1993 (age 32); McAllen, Texas, U.S.

Playing career
- 2013–2016: Texas Tech
- 2016: Gulf Coast Marlins
- 2016: Batavia Muckdogs
- 2017–2018: Greensboro Grasshoppers
- 2018: Jupiter Hammerheads
- Position: First baseman

Coaching career (HC unless noted)
- 2019–present: Texas Tech (V)

Eric Rigoberto Gutierrez (born December 28, 1993) is an American college baseball coach and former professional baseball first baseman. He is the volunteer assistant coach at Texas Tech University. He played college baseball at Texas Tech University from 2013 to 2016. He was drafted in the 20th round by the Miami Marlins in the 2016 Major League Baseball draft. He would play in that organization until 2018.

== Amateur career ==
=== High school ===
Gutierrez played baseball at the high school level for Sharyland High School in Mission, Texas. During his senior year, he was named 1st Team All-State, 1st Team All-District, and garnered an ESPNU National Player of the Week. In 2011, he was named a Louisville Slugger All-American.

He signed to play college baseball with Texas Tech.

=== College ===
Gutierrez played college baseball at the Division I (NCAA) level for the Texas Tech Red Raiders from 2013 to 2016, starting every game of his career.

In his freshman season in 2013, he had a batting average of .251, a .435 slugging percentage, a .377 on-base percentage, and a .991 fielding percentage. He led the team in home runs, total bases, slugging percentage, hit-by-pitch and fielding percentage. He also set a school record for hits-by-pitch for a freshman. Gutierrez was named as a Collegiate Baseball Magazine Louisville Slugger Freshman All-American for his performance.

In his sophomore season in 2014, he had a batting average of .302, a .539 slugging percentage, a .399 on-base percentage, and a fielding percentage of .997 while leading the Big 12 Conference in home runs with 12. He was named American Baseball Coaches Association All-Midwest Regional 2nd Team, All-Big 12 1st Team, NCAA Coral Gables Regional All-Tournament Team and earned two Big 12 Player of the Week Honors.

The 2014 season also saw the Red Raiders first College World Series appearance, after which Gutierrez was selected to participate in the College Home Run Derby in Omaha, Nebraska. He would break the all-time College Home Run Derby record with 52 home runs before finishing as the runner-up to University of Texas catcher and his former high school teammate Tres Barrera.

In his junior season in 2015, he had a .315 batting average, a .443 slugging percentage, a .444 on base percentage, 46 RBI and a fielding percentage of .992. He earned Big 12 Player of the Week and National Collegiate Baseball Writers Association Hitter of the Week during the season and was again named an All-Big 12 1st Team selection, along with a selection for the ABCA All-Midwest Region 2nd Team. He was additionally named the top defensive first basemen in Division I baseball by being selected for the ABCA Rawlings Gold Glove Team, only the second Red Raider to receive the award. Gutierrez was selected again for the College Home Run Derby, finishing 4th.

In his senior season in 2016, the Red Raiders, coached by Tim Tadlock, he had a .347 batting average, a .469 on-base percentage, a .632 slugging percentage with 12 home runs. The team would win the Big 12 Conference regular season championship, the first for the team since 1998, finishing in the top 5 of the national rankings. Gutierrez was named as the Big 12 Player of the Year, and was one of a school-record 4 players named as All-Big 12 1st Team selections. Gutierrez was only the 2nd player in school history to receive the Player of the Year award. During the season, he also set a career conference record for Player of the Week awards with 5. Following Texas Tech's victory in the Lubbock Regional, Guterriez was named a 1st Team All-American at first base by Baseball America, 2nd Team by Collegiate Baseball Newspaper, 3rd Team by the ABCA, and 2nd Team by D1Baseball.com.

Gutierrez finished his regular season college baseball career starting all 230 games he participated in, finishing 1st in Texas Tech's record book for the category. He would break the record during the Lubbock Super Regional victory over Eastern Carolina. During game two of the 2016 College World Series, a two-run homerun by Gutierrez lead Texas Tech to a win over top seeded Florida. He also finished 2nd in at-bats, 3rd in base hits, 3rd in doubles, 3rd in total bases, and 8th in home runs in the school rankings.

== Professional career ==
Gutierrez was drafted by the Miami Marlins in the 20th round, with the 593rd overall selection, of the 2016 Major League Baseball draft. He signed, and after one game with the rookie-level Gulf Coast League Marlins in which he went 3-for-5 with a home run and three RBI, he was promoted to the Low-A Batavia Muckdogs. Gutierrez spent the rest of 2016 with Batavia where he posted a .218 batting average with five home runs and 36 RBI. In 2017, he played for the Single-A Greensboro Grasshoppers, where he batted .258 with seven home runs, 49 RBI, and a .707 OPS.

Gutierrez split the 2018 season between Greensboro and the High-A Jupiter Hammerheads, slashing .281/.348/.410 with three home runs, 18 RBI, and one stolen base across 51 total appearances.

== Coaching career ==
On September 5, 2018, Gutierrez returned to Texas Tech as a volunteer assistant coach.

== Awards and honors ==
- Big 12 Conference Player of the Year (2016)
- ABCA Rawlings Gold Glove Award (2015)
- All-Big 12 Conference 1st Team (2014, 2015, 2016)
- Baseball America All-American 1st Team (2016)
- Collegiate Baseball Newspaper All-American 2nd Team (2016)
- ABCA All-American 3rd Team (2016)
- ABCA All-Midwest Region 2nd Team (2015)
- Collegiate Baseball Newspaper Louisville Slugger Freshman All-American (2013)
- College Home Run Derby participant (2014, 2015)
