= Kendrick Family Ballpark =

Baseball park in Granville, West Virginia

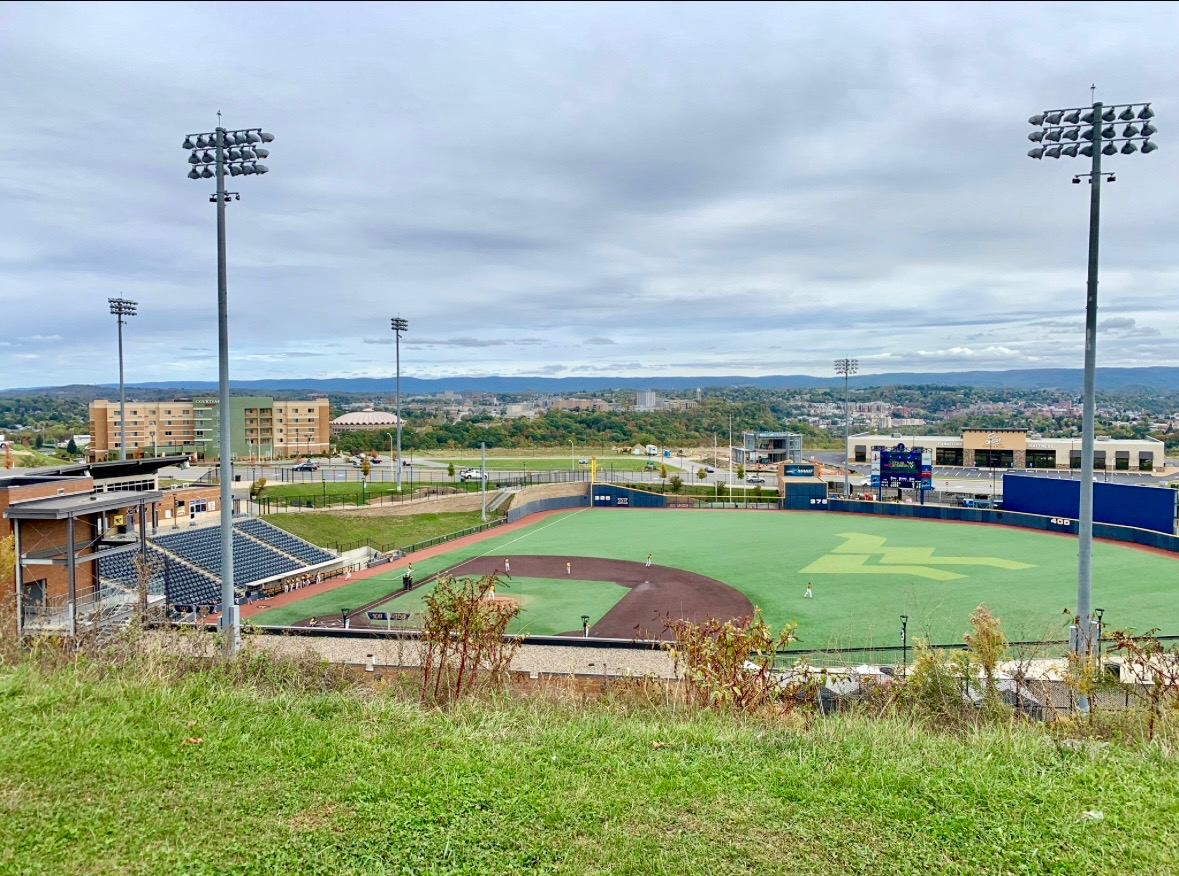
- Wagener Field at Kendrick Family Ballpark

- Location within West Virginia Location within the United States
- Interactive map of Kendrick Family Ballpark
- Full name: Wagener Field at Kendrick Family Ballpark
- Former names: Monongalia County Ballpark (2015–2024)
- Address: 2040 Gyorko Drive; Granville, West Virginia 26534
- Coordinates: 39°38′38″N 79°59′46″W
- Owner: Monongalia County
- Operator: West Virginia University
- Capacity: 3,500
- Executive suites: 3
- Type: Stadium
- Event: Baseball
- Surface: Astroturf 3D
- Record attendance: 4,675 vs Cal Poly (June 6, 2026)
- Field size: Left field: 325ft Left-center field: 375ft Center field: 400ft Right-center field: 375ft Right field: 325ft

Construction
- Groundbreaking: October 17, 2013
- Built: 2013–2015
- Opened: April 10, 2015
- Cost: $21 Million ($28.5 million in 2025 dollars)
- Architects: DLA+ Architecture & Interior Design

Tenants
- West Virginia Mountaineers (NCAA) 2015–present West Virginia Black Bears (MLBDL) 2015–present

Wagener Field at Kendrick Family Ballpark is a baseball stadium in Granville, West Virginia. The stadium, which opened April 10, 2015, is the home of the West Virginia Mountaineers baseball team of West Virginia University (WVU), a member of the Big 12 Conference, and the West Virginia Black Bears, a collegiate summer baseball team of the MLB Draft League.

== Construction ==
Plans were announced to build a new stadium for the West Virginia Mountaineers baseball team in 2013. Ground was broken for the new ballpark at University Town Centre, an off-campus shopping and entertainment complex in Granville, adjacent to WVU's home city of Morgantown, on October 17, 2013. The ballpark has 2,500 fixed seats with additional hillside and club seating, a fan amenity deck, and a park that is open year-round. The field has a synthetic surface, other than the clay pitcher's mound.

In August 2014, the Jamestown Jammers of the Class A Short Season New York–Penn League, a Minor League Baseball affiliate of the Pittsburgh Pirates of Major League Baseball, announced that they would move to West Virginia, taking the name "West Virginia Black Bears", and use Monongalia County Ballpark as their home stadium. The Black Bears were affiliated with the Pirates from their inception until MLB's reorganization of the minors after the 2020 season. They then became a collegiate summer baseball team of the MLB Draft League.

As a result of inclement weather in February 2015, the scheduled opening of the stadium was pushed back to April 10, 2015.

== Name change ==
In 2024, West Virginia University officially renamed its baseball stadium Kendrick Family Ballpark at the Monongalia County Baseball Complex in honor of alumnus and Arizona Diamondbacks owner Ken Kendrick, following a major gift from the Kendrick family. The donation supports facility upgrades, most notably the construction of a new 8,200-square-foot indoor pitching and hitting facility, which opened in March 2025. The facility will feature two regulation-size pitching lanes, two full-size batting cages, a soft toss area, and state-of-the-art Trackman technology for performance analytics.

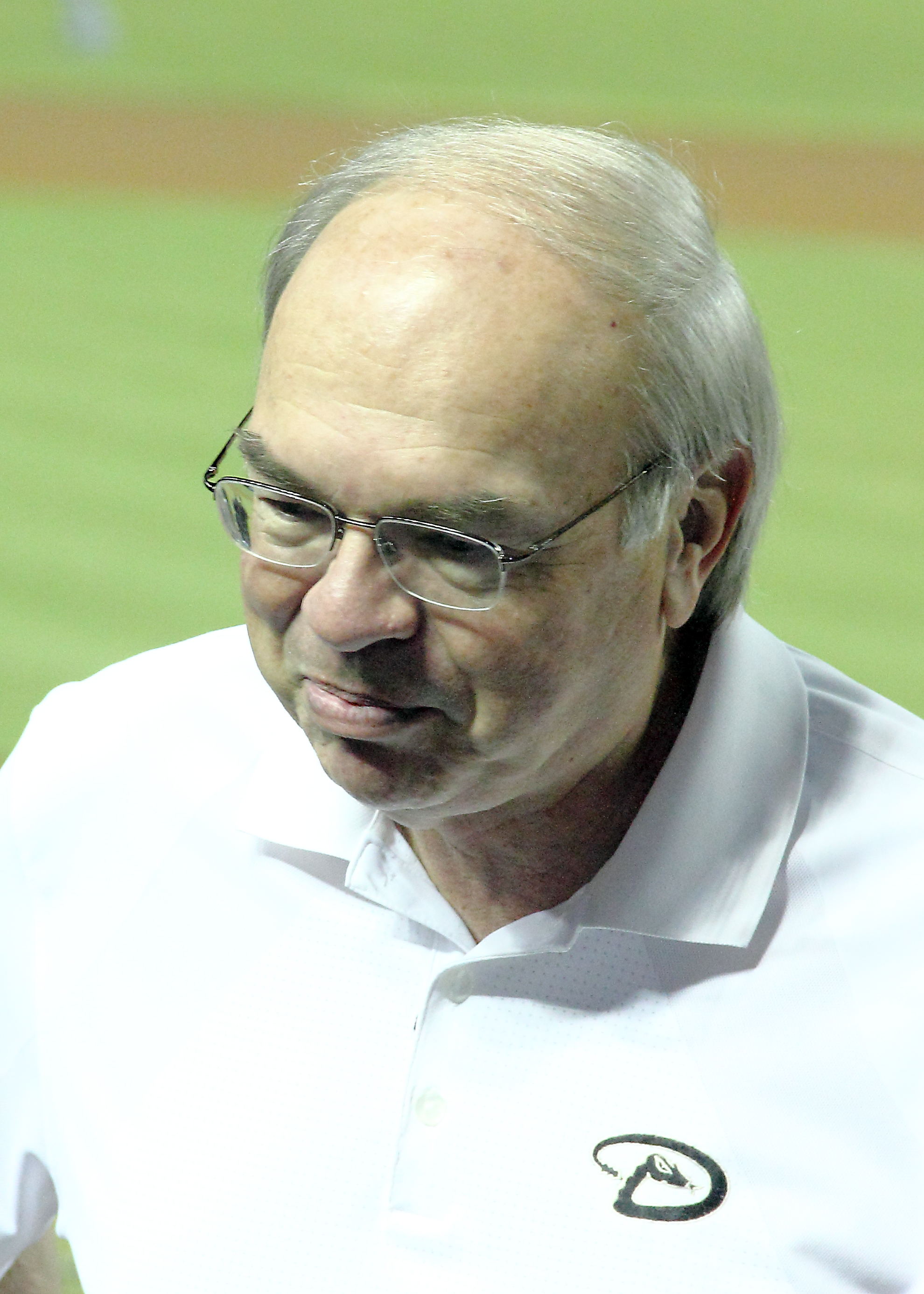
Ken Kendrick, namesake of Kendrick Family Ballpark.

== Attendance ==
=== Top 30 single-game attendance at Kendrick Family Ballpark ===
Rank	Attendance	Date	Game Result	Notes
1	4,675	June 6, 2026	#9 West Virginia 17; Cal Poly 1	2nd game of the 2026 NCAA Morgantown Super Regional.
2	4,629	April 2, 2025	#25 West Virginia 11; Pitt 1	Largest Regular Season Game at Kendrick Family Ballpark.
3	4,614	April 16, 2024	#22 West Virginia 6 Pitt 3	
4	4,564	June 5, 2026	#9 West Virginia 12; Cal Poly 2	1st game of the 2026 NCAA Morgantown Super Regional.
5	4,387	May 6, 2023	#12 West Virginia 3 Oklahoma 6	Largest Big 12 Conference Regular Season Game at Kendrick Family Ballpark.
6	4,355	May 31, 2019	#13 West Virginia 6 Fordham 2	NCAA Morgantown Regional
7	4,289	April 18, 2025	#24 West Virginia 6 Cincinnati 4	
8	4,258	June 1, 2019	#13 West Virginia 0 Duke 4	NCAA Morgantown Regional
9	4,223	April 27, 2024	West Virginia 5 Baylor 2	
10	4,084	May 16, 2025	#16 West Virginia 5 Kansas 8	
11	4,070	May 3, 2023	#12 West Virginia 10; Pitt 0	
12	4,062	May 17, 2025	West Virginia 0 Kansas 7	
13	3,913	April 13, 2024	West Virginia 7 #17 UCF 5	
14	3,848	May 3, 2025	#16 West Virginia 4 Texas Tech 6	
15	3,788	June 2, 2019	#13 West Virginia 10 #17 Texas A&M 11	NCAA Morgantown Regional
16	3,776	April 22, 2025	#24 West Virginia 10; Cincinnati 5	
17	3,748	May 8, 2024	West Virginia 18; Penn State 5	
18	3,716	May 15, 2024	#16 West Virginia 0 Kansas 3	
19	3,712	April 26, 2024	West Virginia 4 Baylor 3	
20	3,631	May 11, 2024	West Virginia 5 Kansas State 2	
21	3,494	April 13, 2019	West Virginia 4 #11 Texas Tech 3	
22	3,487	April 3, 2019	West Virginia 7 Pitt 5	
23	3,475	April 25, 2023	#18 West Virginia 14; Penn State 2	
24	3,451	April 14, 2024	West Virginia 18 #17 UCF 5	
25	3,441	April 21, 2023	West Virginia 5 TCU 4	
26	3,417	April 5, 2025	West Virginia 6 Utah 4	
27	3,415	April 15, 2017	West Virginia 4 #2 TCU 3	
28	3,411	May 5, 2023	#12 West Virginia 9 Oklahoma 3	
29	3,384	April 5, 2025	#16 West Virginia 5 Texas Tech 0	
30	3,370	April 17, 2025	#24 West Virginia 3 Cincinnati 2	

=== Yearly attendance at Kendrick Family Ballpark ===
Year	Home Games	Total Attendance	Natl. Rank by Total	Average Attendance	Natl. Rank by Average
2015	22	33,158	60	1,507	44
2016	30	40,390	49	1,346	49
2017	22	40,613	50	1,846	37
2018	23	35,101	56	1,526	47
2019	23	41,253	48	1,794	37
2020	3	2,174	142	725	77
2021	27	15,845	49	587	49
2022	22	50,058	43	2,275	31
2023	24	59,894	41	2,496	32
2024	23	67,084	38	2,917	27
2025	24	77,877	35	3,245	27

Attendance as of 26 May 2025
2020 season cancelled due to COVID-19

== Milestones and facts ==
West Virginia's records at Kendrick Family Ballpark since 2015.

Achievement	Record
Largest Attendance	4,675 – June 6, 2026, vs. Cal Poly
Overall Record in Facility	162–80 (.669)*
Big 12 Record in Facility	72–51 (.585)*
Record vs. Ranked; Opponents	23–24 (.489)*
Record vs. State Opponents	10–0 (1.000)*
Record vs. Rivals	24–5 (.828)*
1st Game	April 10, 2015, vs. Butler
1st Win	6–5^{13} April 10, 2015, vs. Butler
1st Big 12 Win	6–5 April 18, 2015, vs. #23 Oklahoma
1st Win over Ranked Team	6–5 April 18, 2015, vs. #23 Oklahoma
1st Regional Hosted	May 31, 2019, vs. Fordham
*As of 12 May 2025

== Wagener Field at Kendrick Family Ballpark v. Hawley Field ==
Wagener Field at Kendrick Family Ballpark v. Hawley Field
Kendrick Family Ballpark	Section	Hawley Field
3,500	Seating	1,500
5,900 sq ft (550 m^{2})	Restrooms	0 sq ft (0 m^{2})
0 sq ft (0 m^{2})	Concessions	0 sq ft (0 m^{2})
0 sq ft (0 m^{2})	Suites	N/A
0 sq ft (0 m^{2})	Club Lounge	N/A
8,200 sq ft (760 m^{2})	Team Area	0 sq ft (0 m^{2})
0 sq ft (0 m^{2})	Press Area	0 sq ft (0 m^{2})

== Climate ==
Kendrick Family Ballpark

Climate chart (precipitation, max. and min. temperature)
J	F	M	A	M	J	J	A	S	O	N	D
0.7 39 24	0.7 43 26	0.7 52 32	0.5 64 42	0.7 72 50	1.1 80 59	1.7 83 63	2.9 82 62	2.9 76 55	2.1 65 44	1.1 54 36	1.1 42 27
- █ Average max. and min. temperatures in °F
- █ Precipitation totals in inches
Metric conversion
J	F	M	A	M	J	J	A	S	O	N	D
17 4 −5	19 6 −4	17 11 0	13 18 5	18 22 10	27 27 15	43 29 17	74 28 17	73 24 13	53 18 7	28 12 2	27 6 −3
- █ Average max. and min. temperatures in °C
- █ Precipitation totals in mm

== Awards ==
- Best short season Single A ballpark in the country according to BallparkDigest.com in 2015.
- Ballpark of the Year in 2015 according to BaseballParks.com

== See also ==
- List of NCAA Division I baseball venues
