= 2024 Big 12 Conference baseball tournament =

American college baseball tournament

- Teams: 10
- Format: two bracket Double-elimination tournament with single-elimination semifinals and championship games
- Finals site: Globe Life Field; Arlington, Texas
- Champions: Oklahoma State (4th title)
- Television: Bracket Play: ESPN+, ESPNU; Championship: ESPNU

2024 Big 12 Conference baseball standings
	Conf.				Overall
Team	W		L	PCT	W		L	PCT
No. 18 Oklahoma ‍†‍‍^{y}	23	–	7	.767	40	–	21	.656
No. 21 Oklahoma State ‍‍‡‍^{y}	19	–	9	.679	42	–	19	.689
Texas ‍‍‍^{y}	20	–	10	.667	36	–	24	.600
No. 13 West Virginia ‍‍‍^{y}	19	–	11	.633	36	–	24	.600
Cincinnati ‍‍‍	17	–	13	.567	32	–	25	.561
No. 14 Kansas State ‍‍‍^{y}	15	–	15	.500	35	–	26	.574
Kansas ‍‍‍	15	–	15	.500	31	–	23	.574
UCF ‍‍‍^{y}	14	–	15	.483	37	–	21	.638
TCU ‍‍‍	14	–	16	.467	33	–	21	.611
Texas Tech ‍‍‍	12	–	17	.414	33	–	26	.559
Baylor ‍‍‍	10	–	20	.333	22	–	31	.415
Houston ‍‍‍	7	–	21	.250	26	–	28	.481
BYU ‍‍‍	7	–	23	.233	21	–	31	.404
† – Conference champion ‡ – Tournament champion y – Invited to the NCAA tournament As of June 26, 2024; Rankings from D1baseball

The 2024 Big 12 Conference baseball tournament was held from May 21 through 25 at Globe Life Field in Arlington, Texas. The annual tournament determines the conference champion of the Division I Big 12 Conference for college baseball. The winner of the tournament will earn the league's automatic bid to the 2024 NCAA Division I baseball tournament.

The tournament has been held since 1997, the inaugural year of the Big 12 Conference. Among current league members, Texas has won the most championships with five. Among original members, Kansas State has never won the event. Defending champion TCU won their fourth championship in 2023. Iowa State discontinued their program after the 2001 season without having won a title. Oklahoma State and Oklahoma both have three titles each.

== Format and seeding ==
The top ten finishers from the regular season will be seeded one through ten, and will then play a two-bracket double-elimination tournament leading to single-elimination semifinals and championship games. This is a subtle change from the previous season where semifinal games were replayed in the event that the losing team had not lost in the previous rounds. Also new in 2024, the top two overall seeds will receive a first round bye.

Seed	School	Conf.	Over.	Tiebreaker
#1	Oklahoma†	23–7	34–18	
#2	Oklahoma State†	19–9	36–16	
#3	Texas	20–10	35–20	
#4	West Virginia	19–11	33–21	
#5	Cincinnati	17–13	31–23	
#6	Kansas State	15–15	32–22	2–1 vs Kansas
#7	Kansas	15–15	29–22	1–2 vs Kansas State
#8	UCF	14–15	33–18	
#9	TCU	14–16	32–19	
#10	Texas Tech	12–17	31–24	

† First Round Bye

== Bracket ==
First round Tuesday May 21; Wednesday May 22
7	Kansas	2
6	Kansas State	1
9	TCU	5
4	West Virginia	2
6	Kansas State	8
4	West Virginia	4
8	UCF	6^{(11)}
5	Cincinnati	5
10	Texas Tech	6
3	Texas	4
5	Cincinnati	8
3	Texas	7

Second round Wednesday May 22; Thursday May 23
1	Oklahoma	4
9	TCU	0
6	Kansas State	4
9	TCU	9
2	Oklahoma State	7
10	Texas Tech	2
5	Cincinnati	5
10	Texas Tech	10

Third round Thursday May 23; Friday May 24
1	Oklahoma	7
7	Kansas	5
9	TCU	10
7	Kansas	11
2	Oklahoma State	6
8	UCF	7^{(10)}
2	Oklahoma State	4
10	Texas Tech	0

Semifinals; Friday May 24
1	Oklahoma	8
7	Kansas	6
8	UCF	1
2	Oklahoma State	10

Finals; Saturday May 25
1	Oklahoma	3
2	Oklahoma State	9

== Schedule ==
Game	Time*	Matchup^{#}	Score	Television	notes
Tuesday, May 21
1	9:00am	No. 7 Kansas vs No. 6 Kansas State	2–1	ESPN+	
2	12:30pm	No. 9 TCU vs No. 4 West Virginia	5–2	ESPN+	
3	4:00pm	No. 8 UCF vs No. 5 Cincinnati	6–5^{(11)}	ESPN+	
4	7:30pm	No. 10 Texas Tech vs No. 3 Texas	6–4	ESPN+	
Wednesday, May 22
5	9:00am	No. 6 Kansas State vs No. 4 West Virginia	8–4	ESPNU	West Virginia Eliminated
6	12:30pm	No. 1 Oklahoma vs No. 9 TCU	4–0	ESPN+	
7	4:00pm	No. 5 Cincinnati vs No. 3 Texas	8–7	ESPN+	Texas Eliminated
8	7:30pm	No. 2 Oklahoma State vs No. 10 Texas Tech	7–2	ESPN+	
Thursday, May 23
9	9:00am	No. 9 TCU vs No. 6 Kansas State	9–4	ESPN+	Kansas State Eliminated
10	12:30pm	No. 1 Oklahoma vs No. 7 Kansas	7–5	ESPN+	
11	4:00pm	No. 10 Texas Tech vs No. 5 Cincinnati	10–5	ESPNU	Cincinnati Eliminated
12	7:30pm	No. 8 UCF vs No. 2 Oklahoma State	7–6^{(10)}	ESPNU	
Friday, May 24
13	9:00am	No. 7 Kansas vs No. 9 TCU	11–10	ESPN+	TCU Eliminated
14	12:30pm	No. 1 Oklahoma vs No. 7 Kansas	8–6	ESPN+	Kansas Eliminated
15	4:00pm	No. 2 Oklahoma State vs No. 10 Texas Tech	4–0	ESPN+	Texas Tech Eliminated
16	7:30pm	No. 2 Oklahoma State vs No. 8 UCF	10–1	ESPN+	UCF Eliminated
Saturday, May 25
17	5:00pm	No. 2 Oklahoma State vs No. 1 Oklahoma	9–3	ESPNU	OU Eliminated
*Game times in CDT. # – Rankings denote tournament seed.
