= 2024 Coastal Carolina Chanticleers baseball team =

American college baseball season

2024 Coastal Carolina Chanticleers baseball

Clemson Regional
- Conference: Sun Belt Conference
- Record: 37–24 (16–14 SBC)
- Head coach: Gary Gilmore (29th season)
- Assistant coaches: Kevin Schnall (21st season); Jason Beverlin (3rd season); Matt Schilling (17th season)
- Home stadium: Springs Brooks Stadium

2024 Sun Belt Conference baseball standings
	Conf.						Overall
Team	W		L		T	PCT	W		L		T	PCT
No. 22 Louisiana ‍†‍‍^{y}	23	–	7	–	0	.767	40	–	18	–	0	.690
No. 23 Southern Miss ‍‍‡‍^{y}	20	–	10	–	0	.667	40	–	18	–	0	.690
Troy ‍‍‍	18	–	12	–	0	.600	37	–	22	–	0	.627
James Madison ‍‍‍^{y}	17	–	13	–	0	.567	34	–	23	–	0	.596
Georgia Southern ‍‍‍	17	–	13	–	0	.567	33	–	25	–	0	.569
Appalachian State ‍‍‍	16	–	13	–	1	.550	33	–	21	–	1	.609
Coastal Carolina ‍‍‍^{y}	16	–	14	–	0	.533	34	–	23	–	0	.596
Old Dominion ‍‍‍	15	–	15	–	0	.500	31	–	26	–	0	.544
South Alabama ‍‍‍	14	–	16	–	0	.467	31	–	24	–	0	.564
Texas State ‍‍‍	13	–	17	–	0	.433	27	–	29	–	0	.482
Georgia State ‍‍‍	13	–	17	–	0	.433	25	–	32	–	0	.439
Louisiana–Monroe ‍‍‍	11	–	19	–	0	.367	25	–	30	–	0	.455
Marshall ‍‍‍	9	–	21	–	0	.300	18	–	37	–	0	.327
Arkansas State ‍‍‍	7	–	22	–	1	.250	21	–	32	–	1	.398
† – Conference champion ‡ – Tournament champion y – Invited to the NCAA Tournament; As of May 26, 2024; Rankings from D1Baseball

The 2024 Coastal Carolina Chanticleers baseball team represented Coastal Carolina University during the 2024 NCAA Division I baseball season. The Chanticleers played their home games at Springs Brooks Stadium and were led by twenty-ninth year head coach Gary Gilmore. They were members of the Sun Belt Conference.

== Preseason ==
=== Sun Belt Conference Coaches Poll ===
The Sun Belt Conference Coaches Poll was released February 7, 2024, and the Chanticleers were picked to finish first overall in the conference.

Coaches Poll
Predicted finish	Team	Votes (1st place)
1	Coastal Carolina	193 (12)
2	Southern Miss	173
3	Troy	164
4	Louisiana	159 (2)
5	Texas State	138
6	Old Dominion	115
7	Georgia Southern	99
8	South Alabama	98
9	App State	82
10	James Madison	79
11	Georgia State	78
12	Marshall	34
13	ULM	33
14	Arkansas State	25

=== Preseason All-Sun Belt Team & Honors ===
- Niko Mazza (USM Jr, Pitcher)
- Billy Oldham (USM Sr, Pitcher)
- Grayson Stewart (TROY Jr, Pitcher)
- Noah Manning (TROY Sr, Pitcher)
- Caden Bodine (CCU, So, Catcher)
- Zach Beach (CCU, Gr, 1st Base)
- Chase Mora (TXST, So, 2nd Base)
- Kyle DeBarge (LA Jr, Shortstop)
- Jarrett Brown (GASO Sr, 3rd Base)
- CJ Boyd (APP Sr, Outfield)
- Fenwick Trimble (JMU Jr, Outfield)
- Shane Lewis (TROY Jr, Outfield)
- Derek Bender (CCU Jr, Designated Hitter)
- Sam Blancato (GASO, RS-Sr, Utility)

== Personnel ==
2024 Coastal Carolina Chanticleers baseball team
Players
Coaches

#	Pos.	Name	B/T	Height	Weight	Year	Home town
1	OF	Sebastian Alexander (redshirt)	R/R	6 ft 1 in (1.85 m)	195 lb (88 kg)	Jr	Mayfield, Ohio
2	RHP	Cameron Flukey	L/R	6 ft 6 in (1.98 m)	240 lb (109 kg)	Fr	Egg Harbor Township, New Jersey
3	INF	Ty Dooley	L/R	5 ft 10 in (1.78 m)	183 lb (83 kg)	Jr	Elgin, South Carolina
5	INF	Walker Mitchell	L/R	5 ft 11 in (1.8 m)	185 lb (84 kg)	Fr	Lexington, South Carolina
6	OF	Chad Born (redshirt)	L/R	6 ft 1 in (1.85 m)	191 lb (87 kg)	Jr	Placentia, California
7	INF	Blake Barthol	L/R	5 ft 9 in (1.75 m)	187 lb (85 kg)	So	Allentown, Pennsylvania
8	C	Dean Mihos	R/R	5 ft 9 in (1.75 m)	155 lb (70 kg)	So	Chester Springs, Pennsylvania
10	INF	Sam Antonacci	L/R	6 ft 0 in (1.83 m)	193 lb (88 kg)	Jr	Springfield, Illinois
11	RHP	Chase Stryker	R/R	5 ft 11 in (1.8 m)	187 lb (85 kg)	Fr	Royersford, Pennsylvania
12	OF	Jake Books	L/R	6 ft 1 in (1.85 m)	191 lb (87 kg)	So	Royersford, Pennsylvania
13	RHP	Parker Cassell	R/R	5 ft 11 in (1.8 m)	159 lb (72 kg)	Gr	Easley, South Carolina
16	INF	Zack Beach	L/R	6 ft 4 in (1.93 m)	232 lb (105 kg)	Gr	Mechanicsville, Virginia
17	C	Caden Bodine	S/R	5 ft 10 in (1.78 m)	197 lb (89 kg)	So	Haddon Heights, New Jersey
18	LHP	Hayden Johnson	L/L	6 ft 5 in (1.96 m)	219 lb (99 kg)	Fr	Myrtle Beach, South Carolina
19	RHP	Trevor Hinkel (redshirt)	R/R	6 ft 2 in (1.88 m)	192 lb (87 kg)	Sr	Temecula, California
20	OF	Corey Zientek	R/R	6 ft 0 in (1.83 m)	190 lb (86 kg)	Sr	Sugarloaf, Pennsylvania
21	RHP	Jake Manderson (redshirt)	R/R	6 ft 2 in (1.88 m)	207 lb (94 kg)	Sr	Ballston Spa, New York
22	OF	Graham Brown	R/R	6 ft 0 in (1.83 m)	200 lb (91 kg)		Middletown, Maryland
23	OF	Anthony Galason (redshirt)	R/R	5 ft 7 in (1.7 m)	180 lb (82 kg)	Gr	Colts Neck, New Jersey
24	C	Brice Estep	R/R	5 ft 10 in (1.78 m)	196 lb (89 kg)	Fr	Fort Mitchell, Kentucky
25	RHP	Alexander Meckley	R/R	6 ft 2 in (1.88 m)	240 lb (109 kg)	Jr	Gettysburg, Pennsylvania
26	RHP	Riley Eikhoff (redshirt)	R/R	5 ft 11 in (1.8 m)	184 lb (83 kg)	Jr	Bristow, Virginia
27	OF	Cameron Sebuck	R/R	6 ft 0 in (1.83 m)	181 lb (82 kg)	Fr	Mount Pleasant, South Carolina
29	RHP	Matthew Potok (injured)	R/R	6 ft 4 in (1.93 m)	215 lb (98 kg)	Jr	Jackson, New Jersey
30	RHP	Andrew Bowers	R/R	6 ft 2 in (1.88 m)	215 lb (98 kg)	Fr	Mount Pleasant, South Carolina
31	RHP	Will Smith (redshirt)	R/R	6 ft 0 in (1.83 m)	190 lb (86 kg)	Sr	Conway, South Carolina
32	RHP	Josh O'Neil	R/R	5 ft 10 in (1.78 m)	185 lb (84 kg)	Gr	Nutley, New Jersey
33	LHP	Tadan Bell (redshirt)	L/L	6 ft 2 in (1.88 m)	197 lb (89 kg)	Fr	Columbus, Nebraska
35	LHP	Henry Weycker	L/L	5 ft 11 in (1.8 m)	210 lb (95 kg)	Gr	Wellesley, Massachusetts
36	INF	Ty Barrango (redshirt)	R/R	6 ft 1 in (1.85 m)	166 lb (75 kg)	So	San Mateo, California
37	INF	Bobby Atkinson	L/L	5 ft 10 in (1.78 m)	199 lb (90 kg)	Jr	Darien, Illinois
38	RHP	Elias Holbert	R/R	6 ft 4 in (1.93 m)	200 lb (91 kg)	Jr	Sherwood, Oregon
39	RHP	Darin Horn (injured)	R/R	6 ft 4 in (1.93 m)	200 lb (91 kg)	Jr	Bluffton, South Carolina
40	LHP	Dominick Carbone	L/L	5 ft 10 in (1.78 m)	176 lb (80 kg)	Fr	Rocky Point, New York
41	RHP	Oliver Ellison	R/R	6 ft 1 in (1.85 m)	199 lb (90 kg)	Fr	Knoxville, Maryland
43	RHP	Matt Joyce (redshirt)	R/R	5 ft 10 in (1.78 m)	197 lb (89 kg)	Jr	Braintree, Massachusetts
44	LHP	Landon Edwards	R/L	6 ft 1 in (1.85 m)	210 lb (95 kg)	Fr	Woolwich Township, New Jersey
47	LHP	Bryce Shaffer	L/L	6 ft 2 in (1.88 m)	195 lb (88 kg)	Sr	Cape Coral, Florida
49	RHP	Ryan Lynch	R/R	6 ft 4 in (1.93 m)	234 lb (106 kg)	Jr	Snohomish, Washington
51	RHP	Jacob Morrison (injured)	R/R	6 ft 8 in (2.03 m)	245 lb (111 kg)	So	Flushing, Michigan
53	C	Derek Bender	R/R	6 ft 1 in (1.85 m)	235 lb (107 kg)	Jr	Murrells Inlet, South Carolina

Head coach

Garry Gilmore (Coastal Carolina)

Assistant coach(es)

Kevin Schnall (Coastal Carolina)
Jason Beverlin (Western Carolina)
Matt Schilling (Coastal Carolina)

Legend

- (C) Team captain
- (S) Suspended
- (I) Ineligible
- Injured
- Current redshirt

Roster
Last update: 17 April 2024

== Schedule and results ==
Legend
	Coastal Carolina win
	Coastal Carolina loss
	Postponement/Cancelation/Suspensions
**Bold**	Coastal Carolina team member

2024 Coastal Carolina Chanticleers baseball game log
Regular season

February (6–2)
Date	Opponent	Rank	Site/stadium	Score	Win	Loss	Save	TV	Attendance	Overall record	SBC record
Baseball at the Beach Presented by VisitMyrtleBeach.com
Feb. 16	George Mason	#19	Springs Brooks Stadium • Conway, SC	**W** 26–0	**Eikholf** (1–0)	Gartland	**Johnson** (1)	ESPN+	3,174	1–0	
Feb. 17	Indiana	#19	Springs Brooks Stadium • Conway, SC	**L** 2–7	Bothwell	**Flukey** (0–1)		ESPN+	2,986	1–1	
Feb. 18	#12 Duke	#19	Springs Brooks Stadium • Conway, SC	**L** 3–5	Weaver	**Lynch** (0–1)	Beilenson	ESPN+	3,303	1–2	
Feb. 20	UNCW	#25	Springs Brooks Stadium • Conway, SC	**W** 7–2	**Carbone** (1–0)	Phealan		ESPN+	2,123	2–2	
Feb. 23	Illinois	#25	Springs Brooks Stadium • Conway, SC	**W** 17–9	**Ellison** (1–0)	Hutchings		ESPN+	1,932	3–2	
Feb. 24	Ball State	#25	Springs Brooks Stadium • Conway, SC	**W** 12–2; 7 inn	**Meckley** (1–0)	Beeker		ESPN+	2,238	4–2	
Feb. 25	Cincinnati	#25	Springs Brooks Stadium • Conway, SC	**W** 25–2	**Ellison** (2–0)	Boba		ESPN+	2,406	5–2	
Feb. 27	#21 Campbell	#22	Springs Brooks Stadium • Conway, SC	**W** 9–2	**O'Neil** (1–0)	Peschl		ESPN+	2,165	6–2	

March (14–5)
Date	Opponent	Rank	Site/stadium	Score	Win	Loss	Save	TV	Attendance	Overall record	SBC record
Mar. 2	Liberty	#22	Springs Brooks Stadium • Conway, SC	**W** 8–7	**Hinkel** (1–0)	Hertzler		ESPN+	2,154	7–2	
Mar. 3 DH	Liberty	#22	Springs Brooks Stadium • Conway, SC	**W** 12–5	**Carbone** (2–0)	Mathiesen		ESPN+	2,250	8–2	
Mar. 3 DH	Liberty	#22	Springs Brooks Stadium • Conway, SC	**W** 7–0	**Ellison** (3–0)	Dolby	**Flukey** (1)	ESPN+	2,321	9–2	
Mar. 5	USC Upstate	#18	Springs Brooks Stadium • Conway, SC	**W** 14–8	**Cassell** (1–0)	Jefferis		ESPN+	1,908	10–2	
Mar. 6	USC Upstate	#18	Springs Brooks Stadium • Conway, SC	**W** 9–2	**Weycker** (1–0)	Cubbler		ESPN+	1,672	11–2	
Mar. 8	Michigan	#18	Springs Brooks Stadium • Conway, SC	**W** 8–7; 12 inn	**Smith** (1–0)	Rogers		ESPN+	2,309	12–2	
Mar. 9	Michigan	#18	Springs Brooks Stadium • Conway, SC	**W** 19–6	**Meckley** (2–0)	Allen		ESPN+	2,175	13–2	
Mar. 10	Michigan	#18	Springs Brooks Stadium • Conway, SC	**W** 11–6	**Shaffer** (1–0)	Voit		ESPN+	2,775	14–2	
Mar. 12	#7 Wake Forest	#16	Springs Brooks Stadium • Conway, SC	**W** 17–9	**Carbone** (3–0)	Shenosky		ESPN+	5,101	15–2	
Mar. 15	James Madison	#16	Springs Brooks Stadium • Conway, SC	**W** 12–1	**Meckley** (3–0)	Kinsler	**Weycker** (1)	ESPN+	3,257	16–2	1–0
Mar. 16	James Madison	#16	Springs Brooks Stadium • Conway, SC	**L** 2–7	Entsminger	**Shaffer** (1-1)	Vogatsky	ESPN+	2,698	16–3	1-1
Mar. 17	James Madison	#16	Springs Brooks Stadium • Conway, SC	**W** 11–10; 13 inn	**Johnson** (1–0)	Murphy		ESPN+	2,529	17–3	2–1
Mar. 19	NC State	#13	Doak Field • Raleigh, NC	**L** 8–9	Hollis	**Shaffer** (1–2)		ACC+	2,711	17–4	2-1
Mar. 23	App State	#13	Beaver Field at Jim and Bettie Smith Stadium • Boone, NC	**L** 8–16	LaSpaluto	**Carbone** (3–1)		ESPN+	835	17–5	2-2
Mar. 24; DH	App State	#13	Beaver Field at Jim and Bettie Smith Stadium • Boone, NC	**L** 9–8	Welch	**Hinkel** (1-1)		ESPN+	1,133	17–6	2–3
Mar. 24; DH	App State	#13	Beaver Field at Jim and Bettie Smith Stadium • Boone, NC	**W** 17–11	**Carbone** (4–1)	Tujetsch		ESPN+	1,133	18-6	3-3
Mar. 28	ULM	#19	Lou St. Amant Field • Monroe, LA	**L** 3–11	Barlow	**Meckley** (3–1)	Cirelli	ESPN+	1,091	18–7	3-4
Mar. 29	ULM	#19	Lou St. Amant Field • Monroe, LA	**W** 4–1	**Eikholf** (2–0)	Bianchard	**Weycker** (2)	ESPN+	1,021	19-7	4-4
Mar. 30	ULM	#19	Lou St. Amant Field • Monroe, LA	**W** 9–0	**Flukey** (1-1)	Menard		ESPN+	1,039	20-7	5-4

April (7–10)
Date	Opponent	Rank	Site/stadium	Score	Win	Loss	Save	TV	Attendance	Overall record	SBC record
Apr. 2	UNCW	#20	Brooks Field (Wilmington) • Wilmington, NC	**L** 4–6	Craig	**O'Neil** (1-1)		FloSports	1,924	20-8	5-4
Apr. 5	ODU	#20	Springs Brooks Stadium • Conway, SC	**W** 9–2	**Eikhoff** (3–0)	Holobetz		ESPN+	3,648	21-8	6-4
Apr. 6	ODU	#20	Springs Brooks Stadium • Conway, SC	**L** 4–15	Morgan	**Meckley** (3–2)	Gomez	ESPN+	2,723	21-9	6-5
Apr. 7	ODU	#20	Springs Brooks Stadium • Conway, SC	**W** 10–0; 8 inn	**Flukey** (2–1)	Brown		ESPN+	2,398	22-9	7-5
Apr. 9	#14 Wake Forest	#20	David F. Couch Ballpark • Winston-Salem, NC	**L** 3–12	Haiden	**Meckley** (3-3)		ACC+	1,026	22-10	7-5
Apr. 12	Georgia Southern	#20	J. I. Clements Stadium • Statesboro, GA	**W** 7–3	**Eikhoff** (4–0)	Phillips		ESPN+	2,912	23-10	8-5
Apr. 13	Georgia Southern	#20	J. I. Clements Stadium • Statesboro, GA	**L** 3–10	Gross	**Shaffer** (1–3)		ESPN+	3,245	23-11	8-6
Apr. 14	Georgia Southern	#20	J. I. Clements Stadium • Statesboro, GA	**W** 16–4; 8 inn	**Meckley** (4–3)	Fisher		ESPN+	2,518	24-11	9-6
Apr. 16	#11 North Carolina	#19	Boshamer Stadium • Chapel Hill, NC	**W** 5–4	**Carbone** (5–1)	Poston	**Hinkel** (1)	ACC+	3,268	25-11	9-6
Apr. 19	#14 Louisiana	#19	Springs Brooks Stadium • Conway, SC	**W** 9–1	**Eikhoff** (5–0)	Herrmann		ESPN+	2,854	26-11	10-6
Apr. 20; DH	#14 Louisiana	#19	Springs Brooks Stadium • Conway, SC	**L** 6–8	Langevin	**Johnson** (1-1)		ESPN+	2,794	26-12	10-7
Apr. 20; DH	#14 Louisiana	#19	Springs Brooks Stadium • Conway, SC	**W** 12–10	**Bowers** (1–0)	Marshall	**Meckley** (1)	ESPN+	2,863	27-12	11-7
Apr. 23	Creighton	#13	Charles Schwab Field Omaha • Omaha, NE	**L** 3-7	Lamb	**Johnson** (1-2)		FloSports	1,651	27-13	11-7
Apr. 24	Creighton	#13	Charles Schwab Field Omaha • Omaha, NE	**L** 4-5; 10 Inn.	Koch	**Ellison** (3-1)		FloSports	2,443	27-14	11-7
Apr. 26	Troy	#13	Springs Brooks Stadium • Conway, SC	**L** 6-8	Hartzog	**Weycker** (1-1)	Osmond	ESPN+	2,394	27-15	11-8
Apr. 27	Troy	#13	Springs Brooks Stadium • Conway, SC	**L** 4-11	Lyon	**Flukey** (2-2)		ESPN+	2,344	27-16	11-9
Apr. 28	Troy	#13	Springs Brooks Stadium • Conway, SC	**L** 3-15; 7 inn.	Stewart	**Schaffer** (1-4)		ESPN+	2,108	27-17	11-10

May (6–4)
Date	Opponent	Rank	Site/stadium	Score	Win	Loss	Save	TV	Attendance	Overall record	SBC record
May 3	Southern Miss		Pete Taylor Park • Hattiesburg, MS	**L** 2-7	Oldham	**Eikhoff** (5-1)		ESPN+	5,355	27-18	11-11
May 4	Southern Miss		Pete Taylor Park • Hattiesburg, MS	**L** 3-7	Mazza	**Shaffer** (1-5)		ESPN+	5,412	27-19	11-12
May 5	Southern Miss		Pete Taylor Park • Hattiesburg, MS	**L** 5-6; 7 Inn.	Allen	**Cassell** (1-1)		ESPN+	5,318	27-20	11-13
May 7	UNCG		Springs Brooks Stadium • Conway, SC	**W** 15-9	**Johnson** (2-2)	Miller		ESPN+	1,881	28-20	11-13
May 11	Georgia State		Springs Brooks Stadium • Conway, SC	**W** 17-13	**Weycker** (2-1)	Schofield		ESPN+	2,546	29-20	12-13
May 12; DH	Georgia State		Springs Brooks Stadium • Conway, SC	**L** 9-10	McEvoy	**Meckley** (4-4)		ESPN+	2,546	30-20	13-13
May 12; DH	Georgia State		Springs Brooks Stadium • Conway, SC	**W** 17-7; 8 Inn.	**Johnson** (3-2)	Jones		ESPN+	1,881	31-20	14-13
May 14	Clemson		Springs Brooks Stadium • Conway, SC	**Canceled**							
May 16	Marshall		Jack Cook Field • Huntington, WV	**W** 6-3	**Shaffer** (2-5)	Harlow		ESPN+	1,758	32-20	15-13
May 17	Marshall		Jack Cook Field • Huntington, WV	**W** 12-2; 8 Inn.	**Weycker** (3-1)	Blevins		ESPN+	1,581	33-20	16-13
May 18	Marshall		Jack Cook Field • Huntington, WV	**W** 9-5	**Flukey** (3-2)	Miller		ESPN+	1,772	34-20	17-13

Post Season

SBC Tournament (1–2)
Date	Opponent	(Seed)/Rank	Site/stadium	Score	Win	Loss	Save	TV	Attendance	Overall record	Tournament record
May 21	vs. (10) Georgia State	#7	Montgomery Riverwalk Stadium • Montgomery, AL	**W** 5-1	**Shaffer** (3-5)	Garman		ESPN+	428	35-20	1-0
May 22	vs. (2) Southern Miss	#7	Montgomery Riverwalk Stadium • Montgomery, AL	**L** 0-5	Allen	**Hinkel** (1-2)		ESPN+	730	35-21	1-1
May 23	vs. (6) App State	#7	Montgomery Riverwalk Stadium • Montgomery, AL	**L** 3-6	Little	**Shaffer** (3-6)	Lewis	ESPN+	431	35-22	1-2

Clemson Regional (2-2)
Date	Opponent	(Seed)/Rank	Site/stadium	Score	Win	Loss	Save	TV	Attendance	Overall record	Tournament record
May 31	vs. (2) Vanderbilt	#3	Doug Kingsmore Stadium • Clemson, SC	**W** 13-3	**Eikhoff** (6-1)	Thompson		ESPN2	5,403	36-22	1-0
Jun. 1	vs. (1) Clemson	#3	Doug Kingsmore Stadium • Clemson, SC	**L** 3-4	McGovern	**Flukey** (3-3)	Gordon	ESPN+	6,406	36-23	1-1
Jun 2	vs (4) High Point	#3	Doug Kingsmore Stadium • Clemson, SC	**W** 6-5	**Bowers** (1-0)	Gritnz	**Shaffer** (1)	ESPN+		37-23	2-1
Jun. 2	vs. (1) Clemson	#3	Doug Kingsmore Stadium • Clemson, SC	**L** 5-12	Garris	**Hinkel** (1-3)	Gordon	ESPN+	6,061	37-24	2-2

Schedule source:

*Rankings are based on the team's current ranking in the D1Baseball poll.

== Rankings ==
Ranking movements Legend: ██ Increase in ranking ██ Decrease in ranking — = Not ranked
	Week																		
Poll	Pre	1	2	3	4	5	6	7	8	9	10	11	12	13	14	15	16	17	Final
Coaches'	19	19*	20	18	17	15	20	21	20	20	15	—	—	—	—				
Baseball America	19	23	22	22	22	22	—	24	22	21	15	—	—	—	—				
NCBWA†	19	—	22	19	17	13	21	22	17	19	13	—	—	—	—				
D1Baseball	18	25	22	18	16	13	19	20	20	19	13	—	—	—	—				
Perfect Game	25	—	23	23	23	14	22	22	22	22	12	—	—	—	—				

† NCBWA ranks 30 teams in their preseason poll, but only ranks 25 teams weekly during the season.
* A new poll was not released for this week, so for comparison purposes, the previous week's ranking is inserted in this week's slot.
