= 2024 Louisiana Ragin' Cajuns baseball team =

Baseball team of the University of Louisiana at Lafayette

2024 Louisiana Ragin' Cajuns baseball

Sun Belt Conference regular season champions

College Station Regional, 2–2
- Conference: Sun Belt Conference

Ranking
- Coaches: No. 23
- D1Baseball.com: No. 21
- Record: 42–20 (23–7 SBC)
- Head coach: Matt Deggs (5th season)
- Assistant coaches: Seth Thibodeaux; Zach Lafleur; Gunner Leger
- Home stadium: M. L. Tigue Moore Field at Russo Park

2024 Sun Belt Conference baseball standings
	Conf.						Overall
Team	W		L		T	PCT	W		L		T	PCT
No. 22 Louisiana ‍†‍‍^{y}	23	–	7	–	0	.767	40	–	18	–	0	.690
No. 23 Southern Miss ‍‍‡‍^{y}	20	–	10	–	0	.667	40	–	18	–	0	.690
Troy ‍‍‍	18	–	12	–	0	.600	37	–	22	–	0	.627
James Madison ‍‍‍^{y}	17	–	13	–	0	.567	34	–	23	–	0	.596
Georgia Southern ‍‍‍	17	–	13	–	0	.567	33	–	25	–	0	.569
Appalachian State ‍‍‍	16	–	13	–	1	.550	33	–	21	–	1	.609
Coastal Carolina ‍‍‍^{y}	16	–	14	–	0	.533	34	–	23	–	0	.596
Old Dominion ‍‍‍	15	–	15	–	0	.500	31	–	26	–	0	.544
South Alabama ‍‍‍	14	–	16	–	0	.467	31	–	24	–	0	.564
Texas State ‍‍‍	13	–	17	–	0	.433	27	–	29	–	0	.482
Georgia State ‍‍‍	13	–	17	–	0	.433	25	–	32	–	0	.439
Louisiana–Monroe ‍‍‍	11	–	19	–	0	.367	25	–	30	–	0	.455
Marshall ‍‍‍	9	–	21	–	0	.300	18	–	37	–	0	.327
Arkansas State ‍‍‍	7	–	22	–	1	.250	21	–	32	–	1	.398
† – Conference champion ‡ – Tournament champion y – Invited to the NCAA Tournament; As of May 26, 2024; Rankings from D1Baseball

The 2024 Louisiana Ragin' Cajuns baseball team represented the University of Louisiana at Lafayette during the 2024 NCAA Division I baseball season. The Ragin' Cajuns played their home games at M. L. Tigue Moore Field at Russo Park and were led by fifth–year head coach Matt Deggs. They were members of the Sun Belt Conference.

== Preseason ==
=== Signing Day Recruits ===
Player	Hometown	Previous Team
Pitchers
Aidan Grab	Madisonville, Louisiana	Mandeville HS
Matthew Osteen	Lewisburg, Mississippi	Lewisburg HS
Wil Taylor	Lafayette, Louisiana	St. Thomas More Catholic HS
James Trimble	Galveston, Texas	Ball HS; Alvin CC
Hitters
Kasen Bellard	Lake Charles, Louisiana	Barbe HS
Mark Collins	Opelousas, Louisiana	Opelousas Catholic HS
Griffen Hebert	Moss Bluff, Louisiana	Sam Houston HS
Blaine Lucas	Tomball, Texas	New Caney HS
Aarren Marshall	Allen, Texas	Lovejoy HS
Parker Smith	Montgomery, Texas	Lake Creek HS
Brooks Wright	Baton Rouge, Louisiana	Catholic HS

=== Sun Belt Conference Coaches Poll ===
The Sun Belt Conference Coaches Poll was released on February 7, 2024. Louisiana was picked to finish fourth with 159 votes and 2 first place votes. Junior shortstopper Kyle DeBarge was named Preseason Conference Player of the Year.

Coaches poll
Predicted finish	Team	Votes (1st place)
1	Coastal Carolina	193 (12)
2	Southern Miss	173
3	Troy	164
4	Louisiana	159 (2)
5	Texas State	138
6	Old Dominion	115
7	Georgia Southern	99
8	South Alabama	98
9	Appalachian State	82
10	James Madison	79
11	Georgia State	78
12	Marshall	34
13	Louisiana–Monroe	33
14	Arkansas State	25

=== Preseason All-Sun Belt Team & Honors ===
- Niko Mazza (USM Jr, Pitcher)
- Billy Oldham (USM Sr, Pitcher)
- Grayson Stewart (TROY Jr, Pitcher)
- Noah Manning (TROY Sr, Pitcher)
- Caden Bodine (CCU, So, Catcher)
- Zach Beach (CCU, Gr, 1st Base)
- Chase Mora (TXST, So, 2nd Base)
- Kyle DeBarge (LA Jr, Shortstop)
- Jarrett Brown (GASO Sr, 3rd Base)
- CJ Boyd (APP Sr, Outfield)
- Fenwick Trimble (JMU Jr, Outfield)
- Shane Lewis (TROY Jr, Outfield)
- Derek Bender (CCU Jr, Designated Hitter)
- Sam Blancato (GASO, RS-Sr, Utility)

== Personnel ==
2024 Louisiana Ragin' Cajuns baseball team
Players
Coaches

#	Pos.	Name	B/T	Height	Weight	Year	Home town
1	INF	Ben Robichaux	L/R	5 ft 8 in (1.73 m)	170 lb (77 kg)	So	Baton Rouge, Louisiana
2	OF	Bryan Broussard Jr.	R/R	5 ft 10 in (1.78 m)	175 lb (79 kg)	Jr	New Orleans, Louisiana
4	OF	Josh Alexander	L/R	6 ft 1 in (1.85 m)	195 lb (88 kg)	Sr	Napoleonville, Louisiana
5	LHP	Blake Marshall	L/L	6 ft 0 in (1.83 m)	190 lb (86 kg)	Sr	Mandeville, Louisiana
6	RHP	David Christie	R/R	6 ft 5 in (1.96 m)	225 lb (102 kg)	Sr	Lafayette, Louisiana
7	OF	Colton Ryals	R/R	5 ft 10 in (1.78 m)	190 lb (86 kg)	Jr	Hosford, Florida
8	INF	Lee Amedee	L/R	6 ft 0 in (1.83 m)	205 lb (93 kg)	So	Gonzales, Louisiana
9	INF	Duncan Pastore	R/R	6 ft 3 in (1.91 m)	200 lb (91 kg)	Gr	Tampa, Florida
10	INF	John Taylor	L/R	6 ft 0 in (1.83 m)	200 lb (91 kg)	Sr	Tigard, Oregon
11	INF	Connor Cuff	R/R	6 ft 4 in (1.93 m)	200 lb (91 kg)	Fr	Carthage, Texas
12	OF	Caleb Stelly	R/R	6 ft 1 in (1.85 m)	190 lb (86 kg)	So	Baton Rouge, Louisiana
13	RHP	Jack Martinez	R/R	6 ft 4 in (1.93 m)	220 lb (100 kg)	Jr	Corpus Christi, Texas
14	INF	Trey LaFleur	L/L	6 ft 3 in (1.91 m)	195 lb (88 kg)	Sr	Pensacola, Florida
15	C	Clayton Pourciau	R/R	6 ft 0 in (1.83 m)	195 lb (88 kg)	Fr	Livonia, Louisiana
16	INF	Mason Zambo	L/R	6 ft 3 in (1.91 m)	215 lb (98 kg)	Jr	Baton Rouge, Louisiana
18	LHP	Chase Morgan	L/L	6 ft 3 in (1.91 m)	195 lb (88 kg)	Fr	Cypress, Texas
19	LHP	Dylan Theut	R/L	5 ft 11 in (1.8 m)	185 lb (84 kg)	Jr	Fulshear, Texas
20	LHP	Steven Cash	L/L	6 ft 1 in (1.85 m)	180 lb (82 kg)	So	Centreville, Alabama
21	C	Clay Wargo	R/R	5 ft 10 in (1.78 m)	220 lb (100 kg)	Jr	Huntingtown, Maryland
22	INF	Zach Storbakken	R/R	6 ft 1 in (1.85 m)	205 lb (93 kg)	Sr	Sussex, Wisconsin
23	RHP	Brendan Moody	R/R	6 ft 4 in (1.93 m)	220 lb (100 kg)	Sr	Iowa, Louisiana
24	INF	Kyle DeBarge	R/R	5 ft 9 in (1.75 m)	175 lb (79 kg)	Jr	Kinder, Louisiana
25	RHP	Patrick Vienne	R/R	6 ft 3 in (1.91 m)	230 lb (104 kg)	Jr	Natchitoches, Louisiana
26	LHP	Maddox Mandino	L/L	5 ft 9 in (1.75 m)	160 lb (73 kg)	Fr	Minden, Louisiana
27	RHP	Matthew Holzhammer	R/R	6 ft 4 in (1.93 m)	210 lb (95 kg)	Jr	Wister, Oklahoma
29	RHP	Blake McGehee (redshirt)	R/R	6 ft 0 in (1.83 m)	190 lb (86 kg)	So	Alexandria, Louisiana
30	OF	Jackson Halter	L/R	5 ft 11 in (1.8 m)	190 lb (86 kg)	Jr	Texarkana, Texas
32	RHP	Carson Fluno	R/R	6 ft 2 in (1.88 m)	190 lb (86 kg)	Sr	Sun Prairie, Wisconsin
33	OF	Conor Higgs	L/L	6 ft 2 in (1.88 m)	195 lb (88 kg)	Jr	Texas City, Texas
34	RHP	Luke Yuhasz	R/R	6 ft 4 in (1.93 m)	205 lb (93 kg)	So	Moss Bluff, Louisiana
38	RHP	Phil Brennaman	R/R	6 ft 0 in (1.83 m)	195 lb (88 kg)	Jr	Gladstone, Missouri
39	LHP	Andrew Herrmann	L/L	6 ft 3 in (1.91 m)	215 lb (98 kg)	Jr	Kennesaw, Georgia
40	RHP	JT Etheridge	R/R	6 ft 6 in (1.98 m)	225 lb (102 kg)	Sr	Sweet Water, Alabama
42	LHP	Riley Marcotte	L/L	6 ft 2 in (1.88 m)	180 lb (82 kg)	Fr	Loreauville, Louisiana
43	RHP	Drew Kirby	R/R	6 ft 6 in (1.98 m)	190 lb (86 kg)	Fr	Cypress, Texas
45	RHP	LP Langevin	R/R	6 ft 2 in (1.88 m)	225 lb (102 kg)	Jr	Quebec City, Quebec
46	RHP	JR Tollett	R/R	6 ft 2 in (1.88 m)	185 lb (84 kg)	Fr	Ruston, Louisiana
47	C	Jose Torres	R/R	5 ft 8 in (1.73 m)	195 lb (88 kg)	Jr	Doral, Florida
48	RHP	Tate Hess	R/R	6 ft 2 in (1.88 m)	220 lb (100 kg)	Fr	Singer, Louisiana
53	RHP	Murphy Brooks (redshirt)	R/R	6 ft 3 in (1.91 m)	230 lb (104 kg)	Fr	Cypress, Texas

Head coach

Matt Deggs (Northwestern State)

Assistant coach(es)

Seth Thibodeaux (William Carey)
Zach Lafleur (Louisiana)
Gunner Leger (Louisiana)

Legend

- (C) Team captain
- (S) Suspended
- (I) Ineligible
- Injured
- Current redshirt

Roster
Last update: 26 March 2024

== Schedule and results ==
Legend
	Louisiana win
	Louisiana loss
	Postponement/Cancelation/Suspensions
**Bold**	Louisiana team member

2024 Louisiana Ragin' Cajuns baseball game log
Regular season (40–16)

February (5–3)
Date	Opponent	Rank	Site/stadium	Score	Win	Loss	Save	TV	Attendance	Overall record	SBC record
Feb. 16	Wright State		M. L. Tigue Moore Field at Russo Park • Lafayette, LA	**W** 3–2	**Langevin** (1–0)	Luikart (0–1)	None	ESPN+	2,552	1–0	
Feb. 17	Wright State		M. L. Tigue Moore Field at Russo Park • Lafayette, LA	**L** 6–7	Benge (1–0)	**Etheridge** (0–1)	Shoetzow (1)	ESPN+	1,534	1–1	
Feb. 18	Wright State		M. L. Tigue Moore Field at Russo Park • Lafayette, LA	**W** 5–3	**Holzhammer** (1–0)	Benge (1-1)	**Langevin** (1)	ESPN+	2,003	2–1	
Feb. 20	at McNeese		Joe Miller Ballpark • Lake Charles, LA	**W** 11–3	**Herrmann** (1–0)	Strmiska (0–1)	None	ESPN+	1,345	3–1	
Feb. 23	Rice		M. L. Tigue Moore Field at Russo Park • Lafayette, LA	**L** 1–2	Smith (1-1)	**Martinez** (0–1)	Hickson (1)	ESPN+	3,849	3–2	
Feb. 24	Rice		M. L. Tigue Moore Field at Russo Park • Lafayette, LA	**L** 1–6	McCracken (1–0)	**Morgan** (0–1)	None	ESPN+	3,912	3–3	
Feb. 25	Rice		M. L. Tigue Moore Field at Russo Park • Lafayette, LA	**W** 3–0	**Fluno** (1–0)	Urbanczyk (0–1)	**Holzhammer** (1)	ESPN+	3,736	4–3	
Feb. 28	Northwestern State		M. L. Tigue Moore Field at Russo Park • Lafayette, LA	**W** 14–4^{7}	**Brooks** (1–0)	Nichol (0–1)	None		2,479	5–3	

March (15–5)
Date	Opponent	Rank	Site/stadium	Score	Win	Loss	Save	TV	Attendance	Overall record	SBC record
Astros Foundation College Classic
Mar. 1	vs. No. 9 Vanderbilt		Minute Maid Park • Houston, TX	**L** 4–7	Carter (1–0)	**Martinez** (0–2)	Green (1)	Space City	24,927	5–4	
Mar. 2	vs. No. 3 LSU		Minute Maid Park • Houston, TX	**L** 4–5	Jump (1–0)	**Herrmann** (1-1)	Loer (1)	MLBN	21,726	5–5	
Mar. 3	Houston		Minute Maid Park • Houston, TX	**L** 10–13^{11}	Luzardo (1–0)	**Moody** (0–1)	Williamson (1)	Space City	14,726	5–6	
Mar. 6	at Northwestern State		H. Alvin Brown–C. C. Stroud Field • Natchitoches, LA	**W** 3–0	**Brooks** (2–0)	Robinson (0–1)	**Holzhammer** (2)	ESPN+	1,021	6–6	
Mar. 8	Tulane		M. L. Tigue Moore Field at Russo Park • Lafayette, LA	**L** 8–11	Shuffler (2–0)	**Etheridge** (0–2)	Moore (1)	ESPN+	3,568	6–7	
Mar. 9	Tulane		M. L. Tigue Moore Field at Russo Park • Lafayette, LA	**W** 5–4^{10}	**Martinez** (1–2)	Cehajic (0–2)	None	ESPN+	3,686	7–7	
Mar. 10	Tulane		M. L. Tigue Moore Field at Russo Park • Lafayette, LA	**W** 4–3	**McGehee** (1–0)	Moore (1-1)	None	ESPN+	3,699	8–7	
Mar. 13	at Louisiana Tech		J. C. Love Field at Pat Patterson Park • Ruston, LA	**W** 9–5	**Etheridge** (1–2)	Copeland (3–1)	None	ESPN+	2,315	9–7	
Mar. 15	at Arkansas State		Tomlinson Stadium–Kell Field • Jonesboro, AR	**L** 8–11	Charlton (2–0)	**McGehee** (1-1)	None	ESPN+	393	9–8	0–1
Mar. 16	at Arkansas State		Tomlinson Stadium–Kell Field • Jonesboro, AR	**W** 7–6	**Morgan** (1-1)	Schares (0–2)	None	ESPN+	893	10–8	1–1
Mar. 17	at Arkansas State		Tomlinson Stadium–Kell Field • Jonesboro, AR	**W** 8–5	**Cash** (1–0)	Draper (1-1)	**Martinez** (1)	ESPN+	406	11–8	2–1
Mar. 19	Southern		M. L. Tigue Moore Field at Russo Park • Lafayette, LA	**W** 17–7^{7}	**Langevin** (2–0)	Brasseaux (0–3)	**Christie** (1)	ESPN+	2,541	12–8	
Mar. 20	McNeese		M. L. Tigue Moore Field at Russo Park • Lafayette, LA	**W** 4–1	**Holzhammer** (2–0)	Moeller (1-1)	None	ESPN+	2,912	13–8	
Mar. 22	Old Dominion		M. L. Tigue Moore Field at Russo Park • Lafayette, LA	**W** 3–0	**Langevin** (3–0)	Holobetz (2–3)	None	ESPN+	3,396	14–8	3–1
Mar. 23	Old Dominion		M. L. Tigue Moore Field at Russo Park • Lafayette, LA	**W** 13–1^{7}	**Martinez** (2-2)	Brown (1–2)	None	ESPN+	3,579	15–8	4–1
Mar. 24	Old Dominion		M. L. Tigue Moore Field at Russo Park • Lafayette, LA	**W** 3–0	**Christie** (1–0)	Matela (1-1)	**Holzhammer** (3)	ESPN+	3,349	16–8	5–1
Mar. 26	Grambling State		M. L. Tigue Moore Field at Russo Park • Lafayette, LA	**W** 12–4	**Cash** (2–0)	Peguero (1–5)	**Marshall** (1)	ESPN+	2,733	17–8	
Mar. 28	at Texas State		Bobcat Ballpark • San Marcos, TX	**W** 4–1	**Herrmann** (2-1)	Eaton (2-2)	**Langevin** (2)	ESPN+	1,566	18–8	6–1
Mar. 29	at Texas State		Bobcat Ballpark • San Marcos, TX	**W** 16–5	**Morgan** (2-1)	Hall (1-2)	None	ESPN+	1,716	19–8	7–1
Mar. 30	at Texas State		Bobcat Ballpark • San Marcos, TX	**W** 7–6	**Holzhammer** (3-0)	Tippie (2-1)	**Langevin** (3)	ESPN+	1,844	20–8	8–1

April (13–5)
Date	Opponent	Rank	Site/stadium	Score	Win	Loss	Save	TV	Attendance	Overall record	SBC record
Apr. 2	Nicholls		M. L. Tigue Moore Field at Russo Park • Lafayette, LA	**W** 13–3^{7}	**Martinez** (3-2)	Farley (1-2)	**Christie** (2)	ESPN+	3,546	21–8	
Apr. 5	Louisiana–Monroe		M. L. Tigue Moore Field at Russo Park • Lafayette, LA	**W** 4–1	**Herrmann** (3-1)	Barlow (1-2)	**Langevin** (4)		4,122	22–8	9–1
Apr. 6	Louisiana–Monroe		M. L. Tigue Moore Field at Russo Park • Lafayette, LA	**W** 7–4	**Morgan** (3-1)	Blanchard (1-3)	**Holzhammer** (4)		3,793	23–8	10–1
Apr. 7	Louisiana–Monroe		M. L. Tigue Moore Field at Russo Park • Lafayette, LA	**W** 9–2	**Martinez** (4-2)	Robinson (2-1)	None	ESPN+	3,471	24–8	11–1
Apr. 9	Prairie View A&M	No. 19	M. L. Tigue Moore Field at Russo Park • Lafayette, LA	**W** 11–2	**Cash** (3-0)	Battey (1-2)	None	ESPN+	2,514	25–8	
Apr. 10	Louisiana Tech	No. 19	M. L. Tigue Moore Field at Russo Park • Lafayette, LA	**L** 2–7	Hooks (1-0)	**Holzhammer** (3-1)	None	ESPN+	3,515	25–9	
Apr. 12	Marshall	No. 19	M. L. Tigue Moore Field at Russo Park • Lafayette, LA	**W** 3–1	**Herrmann** (4-1)	Harlow (5-4)	**Langevin** (5)	ESPN+	3,802	26–9	12–1
Apr. 13	Marshall	No. 19	M. L. Tigue Moore Field at Russo Park • Lafayette, LA	**W** 1–0	**Morgan** (4-1)	Blevins (2-1)	**Etheridge** (1)	ESPN+	3,597	27–9	13–1
Apr. 14	Marshall	No. 19	M. L. Tigue Moore Field at Russo Park • Lafayette, LA	**W** 2–0	**Fluno** (2-0)	Lyles (0-3)	**Martinez** (2)	ESPN+	3,446	28–9	14–1
Apr. 16	at Southeastern Louisiana	No. 14	Pat Kenelly Diamond at Alumni Field • Hammond, LA	**W** 15–8	**Etheridge** (2-2)	Kinzeler (1-4)	None	ESPN+	1,616	29–9	
Apr. 17	Southeastern Louisiana	No. 14	M. L. Tigue Moore Field at Russo Park • Lafayette, LA	**W** 8–1	**McGehee** (2-1)	Vosburg (0-3)	None	ESPN+	3,344	30–9	
Apr. 19	at No. 19 Coastal Carolina	No. 14	Springs Brooks Stadium • Conway, SC	**L** 1–9	Eikhoff (5-0)	**Herrmann** (4-2)	None	ESPN+	2,854	30–10	14–2
Apr. 20	at No. 19 Coastal Carolina	No. 14	Springs Brooks Stadium • Conway, SC	**W** 8–6	**Langevin** (4-0)	Johnson (1-1)	None	ESPN+	2,794	31–10	15–2
Apr. 20	at No. 19 Coastal Carolina	No. 14	Springs Brooks Stadium • Conway, SC	**L** 10–12	Bowers (1-0)	**Marshall** (0-1)	Meckley (1)	ESPN+	2,863	31–11	15–3
Apr. 24	Houston Christian	No. 17	M. L. Tigue Moore Field at Russo Park • Lafayette, LA	**L** 9–10	Ryan (1-0)	**McGehee** (2-2)	Wells (1)	ESPN+	2,817	31–12	
Apr. 26	Southern Miss	No. 17	M. L. Tigue Moore Field at Russo Park • Lafayette, LA	**W** 3–2	**Herrmann** (5-2)	Sivley (2-4)	**Langevin** (6)	ESPN+	4,048	32–12	16–3
Apr. 27	Southern Miss	No. 17	M. L. Tigue Moore Field at Russo Park • Lafayette, LA	**L** 2–3	Allen (5-2)	**Langevin** (4-1)	None	ESPN+	4,039	32–13	16–4
Apr. 28	Southern Miss	No. 17	M. L. Tigue Moore Field at Russo Park • Lafayette, LA	**W** 13–7	**McGehee** (3-2)	Sivley (2-5)	**Christie** (3)	ESPN+	3,770	33–13	17–4

May (7–3)
Date	Opponent	Rank	Site/stadium	Score	Win	Loss	Save	TV	Attendance	Overall record	SBC record
May 3	at Troy	No. 18	Riddle–Pace Field • Troy, AL	**L** 5–16^{7}	Gainous (2-2)	**Herrmann** (5-3)	None	ESPN+	2,832	33–14	17–5
May 4	at Troy	No. 18	Riddle–Pace Field • Troy, AL	**L** 4–8	Lyon (7-2)	**Morgan** (4-2)	Dill (1)	ESPN+	2,931	33–15	17–6
May 5	at Troy	No. 18	Riddle–Pace Field • Troy, AL	**W** 14–13^{10}	**Christie** (2-0)	Hartzog (7-3)	None	ESPN+	2,499	34–15	18–6
May 7	Jackson State	No. 22	M. L. Tigue Moore Field at Russo Park • Lafayette, LA	**W** 5–0	**Marshall** (1-1)	Spurgeon (4-1)	**Langevin** (7)	ESPN+	3,369	35–15	
May 10	at Georgia Southern	No. 22	J. I. Clements Stadium • Statesboro, GA	**W** 19–3^{8}	**Langevin** (5-1)	Johnson (4-3)	None	ESPN+	2,513	36–15	19–6
May 11	at Georgia Southern	No. 22	J. I. Clements Stadium • Statesboro, GA	**W** 6–4	**Etheridge** (3-2)	Gross (2-4)	None	ESPN+	2,113	37–15	20–6
May 12	at Georgia Southern	No. 22	J. I. Clements Stadium • Statesboro, GA	**W** 9–2	**Fluno** (3-0)	Wray (1-1)	**Christie** (4)	ESPN+	2,083	38–15	21–6
May 16	South Alabama	No. 21	M. L. Tigue Moore Field at Russo Park • Lafayette, LA	**W** 6–5	**Langevin** (6-1)	Starling (5-2)	**Morgan** (1)	ESPN+	39–15	22–6	
May 17	South Alabama	No. 21	M. L. Tigue Moore Field at Russo Park • Lafayette, LA	**L** 0–10^{7}	Shineflew (3-0)	**Martinez** (4-3)	None	ESPN+	3,607	39–16	22–7
May 18	South Alabama	No. 21	M. L. Tigue Moore Field at Russo Park • Lafayette, LA	**W** 13–3^{7}	**Fluno** (4-0)	Mitchell (2-2)	None	ESPN+	3,847	40–16	23–7

Postseason (2–3)

SBC Tournament (0–2)
Date	Opponent	(Seed)/Rank	Site/stadium	Score	Win	Loss	Save	TV	Attendance	Overall record	Tournament record
May 22	vs. Old Dominion	No. 21	Montgomery Riverwalk Stadium • Montgomery, AL	**L** 3–7	Moore (2-1)	**Morgan** (4-3)	None	ESPN+	624	40–17	0–1
May 23	vs. James Madison	No. 21	Montgomery Riverwalk Stadium • Montgomery, AL	**L** 9–10	Entsminger (4-0)	**Christie** (2-1)	Vogatsky (9)	ESPN+	567	40–18	0–2

NCAA tournament (2–2)
Date	Opponent	(Seed)/Rank	Site/stadium	Score	Win	Loss	Save	TV	Attendance	Overall record	Tournament record
College Station Regional
May 31	vs. (3)/No. 24 Texas	(2)/ No. 21	Olsen Field at Blue Bell Park • College Station, TX	**L** 5–12	**Grubbs** (6–4)	Fluno (4–1)	None	ESPN2	7,020	40–19	0–1
June 1	(4) Grambling State	(2)/ No. 21	Olsen Field at Blue Bell Park • College Station, TX	**W** 12–5	**Herrmann** (6–3)	Baez (0–2)	None	ESPN+	6,999	41–19	1–1
June 2	(3)/No. 24 Texas	(2)/ No. 21	Olsen Field at Blue Bell Park • College Station, TX	**W** 10–2	**Morgan** (5–3)	Whitehead (4–2)	None	ESPN2	6,989	42–19	2–1
June 2	vs. (1)/No. 4 Texas A&M	(2)/ No. 21	Olsen Field at Blue Bell Park • College Station, TX	**L** 4–9	Sdao (5–1)	**Christie** (2–2)	None	ESPN+	7,328	42–20	2–2

Schedule source:

*Rankings are based on the team's current ranking in the D1Baseball poll.

== College Station Regional ==
College Station Regional Teams
(1) Texas A&M Aggies	(2) Louisiana Ragin' Cajuns	(3) Texas Longhorns	(4) Grambling State Tigers

First Round
1	Texas A&M	8
4	Grambling State	0
3	Texas	12
2	Louisiana	5
Lower round 1
4	Grambling State	5
2	Louisiana	12

Semi-Finals
1	Texas A&M	4
3	Texas	2^{11}
Lower final
3	Texas	2
2	Louisiana	10

Finals
1	Texas A&M	9	-
2	Louisiana	4	-
