= 2024 Sun Belt Conference baseball tournament =

- Teams: 10
- Format: Double-elimination
- Finals site: Riverwalk Stadium; Montgomery, Alabama
- Champions: Southern Miss (2nd title)
- Winning coach: Christian Ostrander (1st title)
- MVP: Colby Allen (Southern Miss)
- Television: ESPN+

2024 Sun Belt Conference baseball standings
	Conf.						Overall
Team	W		L		T	PCT	W		L		T	PCT
No. 22 Louisiana ‍†‍‍^{y}	23	–	7	–	0	.767	40	–	18	–	0	.690
No. 23 Southern Miss ‍‍‡‍^{y}	20	–	10	–	0	.667	40	–	18	–	0	.690
Troy ‍‍‍	18	–	12	–	0	.600	37	–	22	–	0	.627
James Madison ‍‍‍^{y}	17	–	13	–	0	.567	34	–	23	–	0	.596
Georgia Southern ‍‍‍	17	–	13	–	0	.567	33	–	25	–	0	.569
Appalachian State ‍‍‍	16	–	13	–	1	.550	33	–	21	–	1	.609
Coastal Carolina ‍‍‍^{y}	16	–	14	–	0	.533	34	–	23	–	0	.596
Old Dominion ‍‍‍	15	–	15	–	0	.500	31	–	26	–	0	.544
South Alabama ‍‍‍	14	–	16	–	0	.467	31	–	24	–	0	.564
Texas State ‍‍‍	13	–	17	–	0	.433	27	–	29	–	0	.482
Georgia State ‍‍‍	13	–	17	–	0	.433	25	–	32	–	0	.439
Louisiana–Monroe ‍‍‍	11	–	19	–	0	.367	25	–	30	–	0	.455
Marshall ‍‍‍	9	–	21	–	0	.300	18	–	37	–	0	.327
Arkansas State ‍‍‍	7	–	22	–	1	.250	21	–	32	–	1	.398
† – Conference champion ‡ – Tournament champion y – Invited to the NCAA Tournament; As of May 26, 2024; Rankings from D1Baseball

The 2024 Sun Belt Conference baseball tournament was held at Riverwalk Stadium in Montgomery, Alabama from May 21 to May 26. The tournament used a double-elimination format as in past years. The winner of the tournament, Southern Miss, earned the Sun Belt Conference's automatic bid to the 2024 NCAA Division I baseball tournament. This was the second straight tournament title for Southern Miss, a team who has only been in the conference for two years.

== Seeding ==
Since 2017, the top ten teams (based on conference results) from the conference earn are invited to the tournament. The teams will be seeded based on conference winning percentage, with the bottom four seeds competing in a play-in round. The remaining eight teams will then play a two bracket, double-elimination tournament. The winner of each bracket will play a championship final.

== Results ==
=== Play-in round ===
Tuesday, May 21
Team	R
#10 Georgia State	1
#7 Coastal Carolina	5
Notes: Georgia State eliminated

Tuesday, May 21
Team	R
#9 South Alabama	2
#8 Old Dominion	3
Notes: South Alabama eliminated

=== Double-elimination round ===
First round
8	Old Dominion	7
1	Louisiana	3
5	Georgia Southern	12
4	James Madison	4
4	James Madison	10
1	Louisiana	9
6	App State	5
3	Troy	6
7	Coastal Carolina	0
2	Southern Miss	5
7	Coastal Carolina	3
6	App State	6

Second round
8	Old Dominion	6
5	Georgia Southern	8
8	Old Dominion	5
4	James Madison	15^{(8)}
3	Troy	5
2	Southern Miss	6
6	App State	10
3	Troy	6

Semifinals
5	Georgia Southern	7	–
4	James Madison	1	–
6	App State	5	–
2	Southern Miss	7	–

Finals
5	Georgia Southern	11
2	Southern Miss	14

== Schedule ==
Game	Time*	Matchup^{#}	Score	Notes	Reference
Tuesday, May 21
1	3:00pm	No. 7 Coastal Carolina vs No. 10 Georgia State	5−1	Georgia State eliminated	
2	6:30pm	No. 8 Old Dominion vs No. 9 South Alabama	3−2	South Alabama eliminated	
Wednesday, May 22
3	9:00am	No. 3 Troy vs No. 8 App State	6−5		
4	12:30pm	No. 2 Southern Miss vs No. 7 Coastal Carolina	5−0		
5	4:00pm	No. 8 Old Dominion vs No. 1 Louisiana	7−3		
6	7:30pm	No. 5 Georgia Southern vs No. 4 James Madison	12−4		
Thursday, May 23
7	9:00am	No. 6 App State vs No. 7 Coastal Carolina	6−3	Coastal Carolina eliminated	
8	12:30pm	No. 4 James Madison vs No. 1 Louisiana	10−9	Louisiana eliminated	
9	4:00pm	No. 2 Southern Miss vs No. 3 Troy	6−5		
10	7:30pm	No. 8 Old Dominion vs No. 5 Georgia Southern	8−6		
Friday, May 24
11	3:00pm	No. 3 Troy vs No. 6 App State	6−10	Troy eliminated	
12	6:30pm	No. 4 James Madison vs No. 8 Old Dominion	15−5 (8)	Old Dominion eliminated	
Saturday, May 25
13	9:00am	No. 2 Southern Miss vs No. 6 App State	7−5	App State eliminated	
14	12:30pm	No. 4 James Madison vs No. 5 Georgia Southern	1−7	James Madison eliminated	
15	4:00pm	Game 13 rematch (not necessary)			
16	7:30pm	Game 14 rematch (not necessary)			
Sunday, May 26
17	1:00pm	No. 2 Southern Miss vs No. 5 Georgia Southern	14−11	Southern Miss wins championship	
*Game times in CDT. # – Rankings denote tournament seed.

== All–Tournament Team ==
Player	Team
Colby Allen (MVP)	Southern Miss
Billy Oldham	Southern Miss
Nick Monistere	Southern Miss
Mitchell Gross	Georgia Southern
Sam Blancato	Georgia Southern
Jarrett Brown	Georgia Southern
T.J. McKenzie	Georgia Southern
Mike Mancini	James Madison
Brendan O'Donnell	James Madison
Banks Tolley	App State
C.J. Boyd	App State
Maverick Stallings	Old Dominion
Jacob Gomez	Old Dominion
