= 2024 Iowa Hawkeyes baseball team =

American college baseball season

2024 Iowa Hawkeyes baseball
- Conference: Big Ten Conference
- Record: 31–23 (14–10 B1G)
- Head coach: Rick Heller (11th season)
- Associate head coach: Marty Sutherland (11th season)
- Assistant coaches: Nic Ungs (6th season); Jake Feldman (4th season)
- Hitting coach: Mitchell Boe (2nd season)
- Pitching coach: Sean McGrath (2nd season)
- Home stadium: Duane Banks Field

2024 Big Ten Conference baseball standings
	Conf.						Overall
Team	W		L		T	PCT	W		L		T	PCT
Illinois ‍†‍‍^{y}	18	–	6	–	0	.750	35	–	21	–	0	.625
Nebraska ‍‍‡‍^{y}	16	–	8	–	0	.667	40	–	22	–	0	.645
Indiana ‍‍‍^{y}	15	–	9	–	0	.625	33	–	26	–	1	.558
Iowa ‍‍‍	14	–	10	–	0	.583	31	–	23	–	0	.574
Michigan ‍‍‍	14	–	10	–	0	.583	32	–	28	–	0	.533
Purdue ‍‍‍	13	–	11	–	0	.542	33	–	24	–	0	.579
Ohio State ‍‍‍	12	–	12	–	0	.500	29	–	26	–	0	.527
Penn State ‍‍‍	12	–	12	–	0	.500	29	–	24	–	0	.547
Minnesota ‍‍‍	11	–	13	–	0	.458	25	–	23	–	0	.521
Michigan State ‍‍‍	11	–	13	–	0	.458	24	–	27	–	0	.471
Maryland ‍‍‍	10	–	14	–	0	.417	34	–	22	–	0	.607
Rutgers ‍‍‍	6	–	18	–	0	.250	28	–	25	–	0	.528
Northwestern ‍‍‍	4	–	20	–	0	.167	18	–	34	–	0	.346
† – Conference champion ‡ – Tournament champion y – Invited to the NCAA tournament As of May 26, 2024; Rankings from D1Baseball

The 2024 Iowa Hawkeyes baseball team will represent the University of Iowa during the 2024 NCAA Division I baseball season. The Hawkeyes will play their home games at Duane Banks Field as a member of the Big Ten Conference. They will be led by head coach Rick Heller, in his eleventh season with the program.

== Previous season ==
The 2023 Iowa Hawkeyes baseball team posted a 43–14 (15–8) regular season record, finishing third during the Big Ten regular season. The Hawkeyes reached the championship game of the 2023 Big Ten baseball tournament, but lost to Maryland. Iowa earned an at-large bid into the 2023 NCAA Division I baseball tournament where they were seeded second in the Terre Haute Regional. Iowa reached the regional final, but lost to regional host, Indiana State.

== Preseason ==
=== Preseason Big Ten awards and honors ===
Preseason awards will be announced in January or February 2024.

Preseason All-B1G Team
Player	No.	Position	Class

=== Coaches poll ===
The coaches poll will be released in January or February 2024

Coaches' Poll
Predicted finish	Team	Points
1		
2		
3		
4		
5		
6		
7		
8		
9		
10		
11		
12		

== Personnel ==
=== Starters ===
Lineup
Pos.	No.	Player.	Year
C			
1B			
2B			
3B			
SS			
LF			
CF			
RF			
DH			

Weekend pitching rotation
Day	No.	Player.	Year
Friday			
Saturday			
Sunday			

=== Roster ===
2024 Iowa Hawkeyes baseball team
Players
Coaches

#	Pos.	Name	B/T	Height	Weight	Year	Home town
2	INF	Gable Mitchell	S/R	5 ft 9 in (1.75 m)	175 lb (79 kg)	So	Iowa City, IA
3	C	Max Burt	R/R	6 ft 0 in (1.83 m)	200 lb (91 kg)	Fr	Mason City, IA
5	RHP	Reece Beuter	R/R	6 ft 1 in (1.85 m)	200 lb (91 kg)	RS Jr	Cedar Falls, IA
6	RHP	Zach Voelker	R/R	6 ft 1 in (1.85 m)	215 lb (98 kg)	RS Jr	Granite Bay, CA
8	OF	Ryan Brosius	R/R	5 ft 9 in (1.75 m)	165 lb (75 kg)	Fr	Dubuque, IA
9	OF	Kyle Huckstorf	R/R	5 ft 10 in (1.78 m)	180 lb (82 kg)	RS Sr	Waterford, WI
10	INF	Michael Seegers	R/R	5 ft 10 in (1.78 m)	170 lb (77 kg)	Sr	Oconomowoc, WI
11	OF	Sam Petersen	R/R	6 ft 0 in (1.83 m)	195 lb (88 kg)	Jr	Huxley, IA
12	INF	Jaixen Frost	R/R	6 ft 2 in (1.88 m)	190 lb (86 kg)	Fr	Kellerton, IA
13		Ben Swails	R/R	6 ft 2 in (1.88 m)	195 lb (88 kg)	So	Tiffin, IA
14	RHP	Brody Brecht	R/R	6 ft 4 in (1.93 m)	225 lb (102 kg)	Jr	Ankeny, IA
16	LHP	Elliot Cadieux-Lanoue	L/L	6 ft 0 in (1.83 m)	200 lb (91 kg)	Fr	Saint-Pie, QC
17		Andy Nelson	R/R	6 ft 0 in (1.83 m)	195 lb (88 kg)	Sr	Winfield, IL
18	RHP	Aaron Savary	R/R	6 ft 3 in (1.91 m)	200 lb (91 kg)	So	Dubuque, IA
19	INF	Ben Wilmes	R/R	6 ft 0 in (1.83 m)	180 lb (82 kg)	Jr	Johnston, IA
20	RHP	Marcus Morgan	L/R	6 ft 3 in (1.91 m)	205 lb (93 kg)	Jr	Iowa City, IA
22	RHP	Anthony Watts	R/R	6 ft 4 in (1.93 m)	185 lb (84 kg)	So	Clive, IA
23	RHP	Justin Hackett	R/R	6 ft 3 in (1.91 m)	220 lb (100 kg)	So	Winterset, IA
24	C	Davis Cop	R/R	6 ft 0 in (1.83 m)	205 lb (93 kg)	Sr	Valencia, CA
25	RHP	Jack Whitlock	L/R	6 ft 2 in (1.88 m)	210 lb (95 kg)	Jr	Cumming, GA
26	RHP	Chas Wheatley	R/R	6 ft 6 in (1.98 m)	220 lb (100 kg)	Jr	Edmonton, AB
27	RHP	Drew Deremer	R/R	6 ft 3 in (1.91 m)	190 lb (86 kg)	Fr	Omaha, NE
28	INF	Raider Tello	R/R	6 ft 0 in (1.83 m)	205 lb (93 kg)	RS Jr	El Monte, CA
29	RHP	Jack Young	R/R	5 ft 11 in (1.8 m)	185 lb (84 kg)	Sr	LeClaire, IA
30	LHP	Caleb Strack	R/L	6 ft 3 in (1.91 m)	200 lb (91 kg)	RS Sr	Little Falls, MN
32	C	Reese Moore	L/R	6 ft 0 in (1.83 m)	210 lb (95 kg)	So	Van Meter, IA
33	LHP	Cade Obermueller	L/L	5 ft 11 in (1.8 m)	160 lb (73 kg)	So	Iowa City, IA
34	LHP	Brant Hogue	L/L	6 ft 4 in (1.93 m)	220 lb (100 kg)	Sr	Sioux City, IA
35	RHP	Ganon Archer	R/R	6 ft 3 in (1.91 m)	200 lb (91 kg)	So	Adel, IA
37	RHP	Rowan Donels	R/R	6 ft 5 in (1.96 m)	200 lb (91 kg)	Fr	Cedar Rapids, IA
38	OF	Coy Sarsfield	R/R	5 ft 8 in (1.73 m)	165 lb (75 kg)	RS So	Marion, IA
40	C	Cade Moss	R/R	5 ft 10 in (1.78 m)	170 lb (77 kg)	Sr	Johnston, IA
41	OF	Merrick Mathews	R/L	6 ft 0 in (1.83 m)	195 lb (88 kg)	Jr	Centerville, IA
42		Will Mulflur	R/R	5 ft 11 in (1.8 m)	200 lb (91 kg)	Sr	Mercer Island, WA
43	INF	Ty Plummer	L/R	6 ft 0 in (1.83 m)	180 lb (82 kg)	Fr	Des Moines, IA
44		Kellen Strohmeyer	L/R	6 ft 3 in (1.91 m)	210 lb (95 kg)	So	Dubuque, IA
45	INF	Blake Guerin	R/R	6 ft 6 in (1.98 m)	280 lb (127 kg)	So	Shoreview, MN
46	OF	Connor Hennings	R/R	6 ft 3 in (1.91 m)	215 lb (98 kg)	Jr	Morgan Hill, CA
47		Joe Connolly	S/R	6 ft 0 in (1.83 m)	170 lb (77 kg)	Fr	Omaha, NE
50	LHP	Benjamin DeTaeye	L/L	6 ft 0 in (1.83 m)	190 lb (86 kg)	RS Sr	Clive, IA
51	RHP	Sam Hart	R/R	6 ft 0 in (1.83 m)	190 lb (86 kg)	Jr	Highlands Ranch, CO
52	RHP	Tanner Paschke	R/R	6 ft 0 in (1.83 m)	170 lb (77 kg)	Fr	O'Fallon, MO

Head coach

Rick Heller

Assistant coach(es)

Marty Sutherland
Sean McGrath
Mitchell Boe
Nic Ungs
Jake Feldman

Legend

- (C) Team captain
- (S) Suspended
- (I) Ineligible
- Injured
- Current redshirt

Roster
Last update: January 13, 2024

=== Coaching staff ===
2024 Iowa Hawkeyes baseball coaching staff
Name	Position	Seasons at Iowa	Alma mater
Rick Heller	Head coach	11	Upper Iowa University (1986)
Marty Sutherland	Associate Head Coach	11	University of Northern Iowa (2002)
Sean McGrath	Pitching Coach	2	Lafayette College (2012)
Mitch Boe	Assistant Coach	2	University of Iowa (2019)
Nic Ungs	Director of Operations	6	University of Northern Iowa (2001)
Jake Feldman	Athletic Trainer	4	Valparaiso University (2018)

== Offseason ==
=== Departures ===
Iowa Departures
Name	Number	Pos.	Height	Weight	Year	Hometown	Notes
Jacob Henderson	1	RHP	6 ft 0 in (1.83 m)	185 pounds (84 kg)	RS Junior	Gilbert, Arizona	Graduated
Nick Gottilla	3	LHP	6 ft 1 in (1.85 m)	190 pounds (86 kg)	Junior	Davenport, Iowa	Transferred to Texas
Brayden Frazier	4	OF	6 ft 0 in (1.83 m)	195 pounds (88 kg)	RS Junior	Cedar Rapids, Iowa	Graduated
Sam Hojnar	5	INF	6 ft 2 in (1.88 m)	185 pounds (84 kg)	RS Junior	Naperville, Illinois	Transferred to Maryland
Keaton Anthony	7	U	6 ft 4 in (1.93 m)	211 pounds (96 kg)	RS Sophomore	Hoschton, Georgia	Undrafted; signed by Philadelphia Phillies
Ben Tallman	12	C	6 ft 0 in (1.83 m)	205 pounds (93 kg)	Senior	Billings, Montana	Graduated
Max Tramontana	16	RHP	6 ft 2 in (1.88 m)	180 pounds (82 kg)	Freshman	Cincinnati, Ohio	Transferred to Appalachian State
Brennen Dorighi	24	U	6 ft 2 in (1.88 m)	225 pounds (102 kg)	Graduate	Cherry Hills Village, Colorado	Graduated
Jared Simpson	26	LHP	6 ft 4 in (1.93 m)	205 pounds (93 kg)	RS Senior	Clinton, Iowa	Graduated; drafted by Washington Nationals
Ty Langenberg	27	LHP	6 ft 2 in (1.88 m)	190 pounds (86 kg)	RS Junior	Urbandale, Iowa	Drafted by Minnesota Twins
Ben Swails	31	U	6 ft 2 in (1.88 m)	185 pounds (84 kg)	Freshman	Tiffin, Iowa	Did not return
Luke Llewellyn	34	RHP	6 ft 4 in (1.93 m)	220 pounds (100 kg)	Senior	Urbandale, Iowa	Graduated
Chase Moseley	35	OF	5 ft 7 in (1.70 m)	170 pounds (77 kg)	Senior	Eldridge, Iowa	Graduated
Chas Wheatley	41	RHP	6 ft 6 in (1.98 m)	215 pounds (98 kg)	Sophomore	Edmonton, Alberta	Transferred to Liberty
Gehrig Christensen	43	C	6 ft 1 in (1.85 m)	185 pounds (84 kg)	RS Freshman	Des Moines, Iowa	Suspended from team
Will Christophersen	47	LHP	6 ft 4 in (1.93 m)	210 pounds (95 kg)	RS Junior	Bettendorf, Iowa	Graduated
Drew Proskovec	48	LHP	6 ft 2 in (1.88 m)	180 pounds (82 kg)	Freshman	Clive, Iowa	Transferred to Kirkwood

=== Transfers ===
Incoming transfers
Name	Number	Pos.	Height	Weight	Year	Hometown	Previous School
Reece Beuter	5	RHP	6 ft 1 in (1.85 m)	200 pounds (91 kg)	RS Junior	Cedar Falls, Iowa	Dallas Baptist
Zach Voelker	6	RHP	6 ft 1 in (1.85 m)	215 pounds (98 kg)	RS Junior	Granite Bay, California	Long Beach State
Anthony Watts	7	RHP	6 ft 4 in (1.93 m)	185 pounds (84 kg)	Sophomore	Clive, Iowa	Creighton
Justin Hackett	23	RHP	6 ft 3 in (1.91 m)	220 pounds (100 kg)	Sophomore	Winterset, Iowa	TCU
Davis Cop	24	C	6 ft 0 in (1.83 m)	205 pounds (93 kg)	Senior	Valencia, California	Utah
Brant Hogue	34	LHP	6 ft 4 in (1.93 m)	220 pounds (100 kg)	Senior	Sioux City, Iowa	Oklahoma State
Ganon Archer	35	RHP	6 ft 3 in (1.91 m)	200 pounds (91 kg)	Sophomore	Adel, Iowa	Kirkwood CC
Merrick Mathews	41	OF	6 ft 0 in (1.83 m)	195 pounds (88 kg)	Junior	Centerville, Iowa	Indian Hills CC
Sam Hart	51	RHP	6 ft 0 in (1.83 m)	190 pounds (86 kg)	Junior	Highlands Ranch, Colorado	Indian Hills CC

=== Signing Day Recruits ===
The following players signed National Letter of Intents to play for Iowa in 2024.

Player	Hometown	High School
Pitchers
Elliot Cadieux-Lanoue	Saint-Pie, Quebec	Fadette
Drew Deremer	Omaha, Nebraska	Millard West
Rowan Donels	Cedar Rapids, Iowa	Cedar Rapids Kennedy
Tanner Paschke	O'Fallon, Missouri	Fort Zumwalt North
Hitters
Ryan Brosius	Dubuque, Iowa	Wahlert Catholic
Max Burt	Mason City, Iowa	Newman Catholic (IA)
Joe Connolly	Omaha, Nebraska	Skutt Catholic
Jaixen Frost	Kellerton, Iowa	Mount Ayr
Ty Plummer	Des Moines Iowa	Valley (IA)

=== 2023 MLB draft ===
Round	Pick	Player	Position	MLB Club
8	225	Jared Simpson	LHP	Washington Nationals
11	327	Ty Langenberg	RHP	Minnesota Twins

== Game log ==
2024 Iowa Hawkeyes baseball game log (10–9)
Regular season (10–9)

February (4–4)
Date	Time (CT)	TV	Opponent	Rank	Stadium	Score	Win	Loss	Save	Attendance	Overall	Big Ten
Shipyard Tournament
February 16	5:00 p.m.	BTN+	vs. Seton Hall*	No. 20	Shipyard Park; Charleston, South Carolina	**W** 5–2	**Whitlock** (1–0)	Frontera (0–1)	**Voelker** (1)	112	1–0	—
February 17	12:00 p.m.	BTN+	vs. Ball State*	No. 20	Shipyard Park	**W** 5–0	**Morgan** (1–0)	Schulfer (0–1)	**Watts** (1)	135	2–0	—
February 18	9:00 a.m.	BTN+	vs. Lehigh*	No. 20	Shipyard Park	**L** 4–8	Tolliver (1–0)	**Beuter** (0–1)	Ermigiotti (1)	184	2–1	—
February 20	3:30 p.m.	BTN+	Loras*	No. 18	Duane Banks Field; Iowa City, Iowa	**W** 20–6	**Cadieux-Lanoue** (1–0)	Ackermann (0–1)	None	894	3–1	—
Jacksonville College Baseball Classic
February 23	6:00 p.m.	SECN+	vs. No. 23 Auburn*	No. 18	121 Financial Ballpark; Jacksonville, Florida	**L** 5–7	Tilly (1–0)	**Whitlock** (1–1)	None	2,641	3–2	—
February 24	4:00 p.m.	ACCNX	vs. No. 14 Virginia*	No. 18	121 Financial Ballpark	**L** 9–12	Osinski (1–0)	**Hogue** (0–1)	Barker (1)	4,451	3–3	—
February 25	12:00 p.m.	BTN+	vs. Wichita State*	No. 18	121 Financial Ballpark	**L** 6–12	Geraghty (1–0)	**Whitlock** (1–2)	Hamilton (1)	2,948	3–4	—
February 27	4:05 p.m.	BTN	Northern Illinois*		Duane Banks Field	**W** 14–6	**Young** (1–0)	Ruh (1–1)	None	1,246	4–4	—

March (7–5)
Date	Time (CT)	TV	Opponent	Rank	Stadium	Score	Win	Loss	Save	Attendance	Overall	Big Ten
March 1	6:30 p.m.	SECN+	at Ole Miss*		Swayze Field; Oxford, Mississippi	**W** 13–7	**Cadieux-Lanoue** (2–0)	Spencer (0–1)	None	9,295	5–4	—
March 2	1:30 p.m.	SECN+	at Ole Miss*		Swayze Field	**L** 5–12	Simmons (2–0)	**Morgan** (1–1)	None	11,226	5–5	—
March 3	12:00 p.m.	SECN+	at Ole Miss*		Swayze Field	**L** 3–8	Saunier (2–1)	**Obermueller** (0–1)	None	9,293	5–6	—
March 5	4:05 p.m.	BTN+	St. Thomas (MN)*		Duane Banks Field	**W** 9–3	**Cadieux-Lanoue** (3–0)	Schewe (1–2)	None	924	6–6	—
March 8	6:00 p.m.	ESPN+	at Jacksonville State*		Rudy Abbott Field; Jacksonville, Alabama	**L** 4–5	Maynard (1–0)	**Hart** (0–1)	None	985	6–7	—
March 9	6:00 p.m.	ESPN+	at Jacksonville State*		Rudy Abbott Field	**W** 20–1	**Obermueller** (2–0)	Sleeper (0–1)	None	839	7–7	—
March 10	1:00 p.m.	ESPN+	at Jacksonville State*		Rudy Abbott Field	**L** 1–6	**Cornelius** (1–0)	Morgan (1–2)	**Maynard** (1)	751	7–8	—
March 12	4:00 p.m.	SECN+	at Georgia*		Foley Field; Athens, Georgia	**L** 5–10	Mracna (2–0)	**Cadieux-Lanoue** (3–1)	None	2,958	7–9	—
March 15	4:05 p.m.		Western Illinois*		Duane Banks Field	**W** 11–1^{8}	**Young** (1–0)	Buhl (0–3)	None	1,218	8–9	—
March 16	2:05 p.m.		Western Illinois*		Duane Banks Field	**W** 17–7^{8}	**Savary** (1–0)	Dale (1–1)	None	1,160	9–9	—
March 17	1:05 p.m.		Western Illinois*		Duane Banks Field	**W** 19–9^{8}	**Voelker** (1–0)	Kachinsky (0–2)	None	1,099	10–9	—
March 20	4:05 p.m.		Grand View*		Duane Banks Field							—
March 22	3:00 p.m.		at Purdue		Alexander Field; West Lafayette, Indiana							
March 23	12:00 p.m.		at Purdue		Alexander Field							
March 24	12:00 p.m.		at Purdue		Alexander Field							
March 26	TBA		at Illinois State*		Duffy Bass Field; Normal, Illinois							—
Floyd of Rosedale Series
March 29	4:05 p.m.		Minnesota		Duane Banks Field							
March 30	2:05 p.m.		Minnesota		Duane Banks Field							
March 31	1:05 p.m.		Minnesota		Duane Banks Field							

April (0–0)
Date	Time (CT)	TV	Opponent	Rank	Stadium	Score	Win	Loss	Save	Attendance	Overall	Big Ten
April 2	TBA		at Bradley*		Dozer Park; Peoria, Illinois							—
April 5	4:05 p.m.		Michigan		Duane Banks Field							
April 6	2:05 p.m.		Michigan		Duane Banks Field							
April 7	1:05 p.m.		Michigan		Duane Banks Field							
April 10	4:05 p.m.		St. Thomas (MN)*		Duane Banks Field							—
April 12	TBA		at Ohio State		Bill Davis Stadium; Columbus, Ohio							
April 13	TBA		at Ohio State		Bill Davis Stadium							
April 14	TBA		at Ohio State		Bill Davis Stadium							
April 17	6:05 p.m.		Bradley*		Duane Banks Field							—
April 19	6:05 p.m.		Rutgers		Duane Banks Field							
April 20	2:05 p.m.		Rutgers		Duane Banks Field							
April 21	1:05 p.m.		Rutgers		Duane Banks Field							
April 23	6:05 p.m.		Milwaukee*		Duane Banks Field							—
The Heroes Series
April 26	6:05 p.m.		at Nebraska		Haymarket Park; Lincoln, Nebraska							
April 27	2:05 p.m.		at Nebraska		Haymarket Park							
April 28	1:05 p.m.		at Nebraska		Haymarket Park							
April 30	6:05 p.m.		Illinois State*		Duane Banks Field							—

May (0–0)
Date	Time (CT)	TV	Opponent	Rank	Stadium	Score	Win	Loss	Save	Attendance	Overall	Big Ten
May 1	6:05 p.m.		North Dakota State*		Duane Banks Field							—
May 3	6:05 p.m.		Northwestern		Duane Banks Field							
May 4	2:05 p.m.		Northwestern		Duane Banks Field							
May 5	1:05 p.m.		Northwestern		Duane Banks Field							
May 10	TBA		at Illinois		Illinois Field; Champaign, Illinois							
May 11	TBA		at Illinois		Illinois Field							
May 12	TBA		at Illinois		Illinois Field							
May 14	6:05 p.m.		UIC*		Duane Banks Field							—
May 16	6:05 p.m.		FIU*		Principal Park; Des Moines, Iowa							—
May 17	6:05 p.m.		FIU*		Principal Park							—
May 18	6:05 p.m.		FIU*		Principal Park							—

Post-Season (0–0)

Big Ten tournament (0–0)
Date	Time (ET)	TV	Opponent	Rank	Stadium	Score	Win	Loss	Save	Attendance	Overall	B1GT Record	Source
May 21–26			vs. TBD		Charles Schwab Field; Omaha, Nebraska								

Legend: = Win = Loss = Canceled
Bold = Iowa team member

Schedule Notes

== Rankings ==
Ranking movements Legend: ██ Increase in ranking ██ Decrease in ranking — = Not ranked
	Week																			
Poll	Pre	1	2	3	4	5	6	7	8	9	10	11	12	13	14	15	16	17	18	Final
Coaches'	20	20*	—	—	—															
Baseball America	20	18	—	—	—															
NCBWA†	21	21	—	—	—															
D1Baseball	20	18	—	—	—															
Perfect Game	16	19	—	—	—															

† NCBWA ranks 30 teams in their preseason poll, but only ranks 25 teams weekly during the season.
* A new poll was not released for this week, so for comparison purposes, the previous week's ranking is inserted in this week's slot.
