= 2024 NCAA Division I baseball rankings =

2024 NCAA Division I baseball season
- Duration: February 16, 2024 – June 24, 2024
- Number of teams: 300
- Preseason No. 1: Wake Forest

Tournament
- Duration: June 14–24, 2024
- Most conference bids: SEC (11)

College World Series
- Champions: Tennessee
- Runners-up: Texas A&M
- MOP: Dylan Dreiling

Seasons
- ← 2023 2025 →

The following human polls make up the 2024 NCAA Division I men's baseball rankings. The USA Today/ESPN Coaches Poll is voted on by a panel of 31 Division I baseball coaches. The Baseball America poll is voted on by staff members of the Baseball America magazine. These polls, along with the D1Baseball poll, rank the top 25 teams nationally. The National Collegiate Baseball Writers Association rank the top 30 teams nationally. For the 2024 season, the Collegiate Baseball poll was replaced with the Perfect Game poll as Collegiate Baseball ceased operations in 2024.

== Legend ==
	Increase in ranking
	Decrease in ranking
	Not ranked previous week
Italics	Number of first place votes
(#-#)	Win-loss record
т	Tied with team above or below also with this symbol

== ESPN/USA Today Coaches Poll ==
	Preseason Feb 6	Week 2 Feb 26	Week 3 Mar 4	Week 4 Mar 11	Week 5 Mar 18	Week 6 Mar 25	Week 7 Apr 1	Week 8 Apr 8	Week 9 Apr 15	Week 10 Apr 22	Week 11 Apr 29	Week 12 May 6	Week 13 May 13	Week 14 May 20	Week 15 May 27	Final Jun 25	
1.	Wake Forest (15)	Wake Forest (6–1) (23)	Wake Forest (10–1) (28)	Arkansas (13–2) (18)	Arkansas (17–2) (31)	Arkansas (19–3) (24)	Arkansas (23–3) (31)	Arkansas (27–3) (31)	Texas A&M (32–4) (22)	Texas A&M (35–5) (29)	Texas A&M (38–6) (29)	Tennessee (39–9) (20)	Tennessee (42–10) (29)	Tennessee (46–10) (29)	Tennessee (50–11) (30)	Tennessee (60–13) (31)	1.
2.	LSU (11)	LSU (7–1) (4)	LSU (11–1) (3)	LSU (14–2) (6)	Oregon State (17–2)	Oregon State (21–2) (4)	Clemson (24–3)	Clemson (28–3)	Arkansas (30–5) (7)	Arkansas (34–6) (1)	Arkansas (37–7) (1)	Texas A&M (40–8) (7)	Arkansas (42–10)	Kentucky (39–12) (1)	Kentucky (40–14) (1)	Texas A&M (53–15)	2.
3.	Florida (5)	TCU (7–0)	Arkansas (9–2)	Oregon State (15–1) (1)	Vanderbilt (18–3)	Clemson (22–2) (1)	Texas A&M (25–3)	Texas A&M (28–4)	Tennessee (30–6) (1)	Tennessee (33–7) (1)	Tennessee (37–7) (1)	Arkansas (40–9) (3)	Kentucky (37–11) (1)	Texas A&M (44–11)	Texas A&M (44–13)	Kentucky (46–16)	3.
4.	Arkansas	Florida (5–1) (2)	TCU (12–0)	Texas A&M (16–0) (3)	LSU (17–4)	Texas A&M (21–3)	Tennessee (24–5)	Tennessee (26–6)	Oregon State (29–5)	Clemson (32–7)	Clemson (34–9)	Clemson (36–10)	Texas A&M (42–10) (1)	Arkansas (43–12) (1)	Arkansas (43–14)	Florida State (49–17)	4.
5.	TCU	Arkansas (5–2) (1)	Oregon State (11–1)	Wake Forest (12–3) (3)	Clemson (17–2)	Tennessee (12–4)	Oregon State (21–4)	Oregon State (26–4)	Kentucky (30–5) (1)	Kentucky (32–7)	East Carolina (35–8)	Kentucky (35–10) (1)	North Carolina (39–11)	Clemson (40–13)	North Carolina (42–13)	North Carolina (48–16)	5.
6.	Vanderbilt	Oregon State (7–1) (1)	Texas A&M (11–0)	Tennessee (16–1)	Texas A&M (18–2)	Florida (14–9) (1)	Vanderbilt (23–6)	Vanderbilt (25–7)	Clemson (29–6)	Duke (29–11)	Florida State (34–9)	East Carolina (37–9)	Oregon State (39–12)	North Carolina (41–12)	Clemson (41–14)	Florida (36–30)	6.
7.	Oregon State	Texas A&M (7–0)	Florida (8–3)	Duke (13–2)	Tennessee (18–3)	LSU (19–6)	North Carolina (25–4)	Duke (24–8)	Florida State (30–5)	East Carolina (31–8)	Oregon State (33–10)	Florida State (35–10)	Clemson (37–13)	Oregon State (41–13)	Oregon State (42–14)	Virginia (46–17)	7.
8.	Tennessee	Tennessee (7–1)	Tennessee (11–1)	TCU (14–2)	Florida (12–7)	Virginia (20–4)	Dallas Baptist (23–4)	Kentucky (27–4)	Virginia (28–8)т	Vanderbilt (29–11)	Kentucky (33–9)	Oregon State (35–12)	Georgia (38–12)	Florida State (39–14)	Florida State (42–15)	NC State (38–23)	8.
9.	Clemson	Virginia (7–0)	Clemson (9–1)	Clemson (13–1)	Duke (15–5)	Vanderbilt (19–6)	Florida (16–11)	Florida State (26–5)	Duke (26–10)т	Florida State (31–8)	Duke (30–14)	Duke (32–14)	Wake Forest (36–16)	Georgia (39–14)	Georgia (39–15)	Clemson (44–16)	9.
10.	Texas A&M	Duke (7–0)	Vanderbilt (10–3)	Vanderbilt (14–3)	Alabama (17–3)	Dallas Baptist (19–4)	Duke (20–8)	Virginia (25–7)	East Carolina (27–8)	Oregon State (30–9)	Virginia (33–12)	Virginia (35–12)	Florida State (37–12)	East Carolina (40–13)	Duke (39–18)	Georgia (43–17)	10.
11.	Virginia	Clemson (6–1)	Duke (10–1)	Florida (10–5)	Virginia (16–4)	North Carolina (21–4)	Virginia (21–6)	East Carolina (23–7)	North Carolina (29–7)	Wake Forest (26–13)	UC Irvine (32–8)	North Carolina (35–11)	Duke (34–16)	Oklahoma (34–18)	Oklahoma (37–19)	Oregon State (45–16)	11.
12.	East Carolina	East Carolina (5–2)	Virginia (10–1)	Alabama (15–1)	Florida State (18–0)	Wake Forest (16–7)	Florida State (22–4)	North Carolina (26–6)	Vanderbilt (26–10)	Virginia (30–11)	North Carolina (33–11)	Georgia (35–12)	East Carolina (37–13)	Virginia (40–14)	East Carolina (43–15)	Arkansas (44–16)	12.
13.	Texas	Texas (6–1)	Alabama (11–1)	North Carolina (14–2)	East Carolina (14–4)	Duke (17–7)	East Carolina (20–6)	Dallas Baptist (25–6)	Wake Forest (24–11)	UC Irvine (28–8)	Vanderbilt (31–13)	Wake Forest (32–16)	UC Irvine (38–10)	UC Irvine (41–11)	Virginia (41–15)	Oregon (40–20)	13.
14.	Duke	Vanderbilt (5–3)	North Carolina (10–2)	NC State (12–2)	Wake Forest (13–6)	South Carolina (19–5)	Alabama (21–7)	UC Irvine (24–4)	Alabama (24–12)	North Carolina (30–10)	South Carolina (29–14)	South Carolina (32–15)	Virginia (37–14)	NC State (32–19)	Oklahoma State (40–17)	Oklahoma State (42–19)	14.
15.	North Carolina	Alabama (8–0)	NC State (9–2)	Virginia (13–3)	Coastal Carolina (17–3)	Virginia Tech (18–4)	Virginia Tech (21–5)	Wake Forest (21–10)	Louisiana (28–9)	Coastal Carolina (27–12)	Wake Forest (27–16)	Mississippi State (32–16)	Oklahoma (32–17)	Duke (35–18)	NC State (33–20)	Oklahoma (40–21)	15.
16.	NC State	South Carolina (7–1)	East Carolina (7–4)	East Carolina (10–4)	Dallas Baptist (16–3)	East Carolina (16–6)	Kentucky (24–4)	Virginia Tech (21–8)	UC Irvine (25–7)	Louisiana (31–11)	Oklahoma State (30–14)	UC Irvine (34–10)	Mississippi State (33–28)	Mississippi State (36–19)	UC Santa Barbara (42–12)	East Carolina (46–17)	16.
17.	Alabama	North Carolina (5–2)	Texas Tech (9–2)	Coastal Carolina (14–2)	North Carolina (17–4)	Florida State (19–3)	UC Irvine (22–3)	Alabama (22–10)	Oklahoma State (25–11)	Georgia (29–10)	Alabama (28–16)	Oklahoma (39–17)	Oklahoma State (34–16)	Oklahoma State (36–16)	Wake Forest (38–20)	West Virginia (36–24)	17.
18.	UC Santa Barbara	NC State (4–2)	Coastal Carolina (9–2)	Dallas Baptist (13–2)	TCU (15–5)	Alabama (18–6)	LSU (20–9)	Florida (17–14)	Oregon (25–10)	Oklahoma (24–14)	Georgia (31–12)	Indiana State (34–10)	NC State (29–19)	UC Santa Barbara (39–12)	UC Irvine (43–12)	Duke (40–20)	18.
19.	Coastal Carolina	Texas Tech (6–2)	Dallas Baptist (10–1)	Auburn (12–3)	Campbell (15–4)	UC Irvine (18–3)	South Carolina (21–7)	UCF (21–8)	Dallas Baptist (26–8)	Alabama (25–15)	Louisiana (33–13)	Arizona (29–17)	Arizona (32–18)	Wake Forest (36–19)	Mississippi State (38–21)	Connecticut (35–26)	19.
20.	Iowa	Coastal Carolina (5–2)	Auburn (9–2)	UC Irvine (13–1)т	Oklahoma (13–6)	Coastal Carolina (18–6)	NC State (18–7)	Coastal Carolina (22–9)	Coastal Carolina (24–11)	Arizona (24–14)	NC State (25–16)	Oklahoma State (32–16)	Indiana State (36–11)	Indiana State (39–11)	Arizona (36–21)	Mississippi State (40–23)	20.
21.	South Carolina	Indiana (6–1)	South Carolina (8–3)	South Carolina (13–3)т	UC Irvine (15–3)	Kentucky (20–4)	Coastal Carolina (20–7)	Nebraska (22–7)	South Carolina (25–11)	South Carolina (27–13)	Mississippi State (29–15)	NC State (26–18)	UC Santa Barbara (35–12)	Arizona (33–20)	Indiana State (42–13)	Kansas State (35–26)	21.
22.	Texas Tech	Auburn (6–1)	Texas (7–4)	Florida State (14–0)	UC Santa Barbara (12–5)	NC State (15–7)	Wake Forest (17–10)	Oregon (22–8)	Virginia Tech (23–10)	Oklahoma State (26–14)	Indiana State (31–9)	Troy (34–15)	Louisiana (38–15)	Louisiana (40–16)	Dallas Baptist (44–13)	UC Santa Barbara (44–14)	22.
23.	Stanford	Campbell (6–1)	UC Irvine (9–0)	Campbell (11–4)	Virginia Tech (14–4)	Mississippi State (17–8)	Nebraska (20–5)	Mississippi State (21–12)	Georgia (27–9)	NC State (22–15)	Oklahoma (26–16)	UC Santa Barbara (31–12)	South Carolina (33–18)	Oregon (37–16)	Louisiana (40–18)	Evansville (39–26)	23.
24.	UCLA	Dallas Baptist (7–0)	Campbell (8–3)	Texas (9–6)	Auburn (13–6)	Georgia (21–4)	Georgia (22–6)	Louisiana (24–8)	West Virginia (22–13)	Oregon (27–12)	Arizona (26–16)	Oregon (32–15)	Oregon (34–16)т	Texas (35–20)	Southern Miss (41–18)	LSU (43–23)	24.
25.	Northeastern	UC Irvine (6–0)	Florida State (10–0)	Texas Tech (11–4)	Kentucky (17–3)	TCU (17–7)	TCU (20–7)	Oklahoma State (21–11)	Indiana State (27–7)	Indiana State (29–8)	Dallas Baptist (31–11)	Alabama (29–18)	Alabama (32–19)т	Dallas Baptist (40–13)	Nebraska (39–20)	UC Irvine (45–14)	25.
	Preseason Feb 6	Week 2 Feb 26	Week 3 Mar 4	Week 4 Mar 11	Week 5 Mar 18	Week 6 Mar 25	Week 7 Apr 1	Week 8 Apr 8	Week 9 Apr 15	Week 10 Apr 22	Week 11 Apr 29	Week 12 May 6	Week 13 May 13	Week 14 May 20	Week 15 May 27	Final Jun 25	
		Dropped: No. 18 UC Santa Barbara; No. 20 Iowa; No. 23 Stanford; No. 24 UCLA; No. 25 Northeastern	Dropped: No. 21 Indiana	None	Dropped: No. 14 NC State; No. 20 South Carolina; No. 24 Texas; No. 25 Texas Tech	Dropped: No. 19 Campbell; No. 20 Oklahoma; No. 22 UC Santa Barbara; No. 24 Auburn	Dropped: No. 23 Mississippi State	Dropped: No. 18 LSU; No. 19 South Carolina; No. 20 NC State; No. 24 Georgia; No. 25 TCU	Dropped: No. 18 Florida; No. 19 UCF; No. 21 Nebraska; No. 23 Mississippi State	Dropped: No. 19 Dallas Baptist; No. 22 Virginia Tech; No. 24 West Virginia	Dropped: No. 15 Coastal Carolina; No. 24 Oregon	Dropped: No. 13 Vanderbilt; No. 19 Louisiana; No. 25 Dallas Baptist	Dropped: No. 22 Troy	Dropped: No. 23 South Carolina; No. 24т Alabama	Dropped: No. 23 Oregon; No. 24 Texas	Dropped: No. 17 Wake Forest; No. 20 Arizona; No. 21 Indiana State; No. 22 Dallas Baptist; No. 23 Louisiana; No. 24 Southern Miss; No. 25 Nebraska	

== Baseball America ==
	Preseason Jan 29	Week 1 Feb 19	Week 2 Feb 26	Week 3 Mar 4	Week 4 Mar 11	Week 5 Mar 18	Week 6 Mar 25	Week 7 Apr 1	Week 8 Apr 8	Week 9 Apr 15	Week 10 Apr 22	Week 11 Apr 29	Week 12 May 6	Week 13 May 13	Week 14 May 20	Week 15 May 26	Final Jun 25	
1.	Wake Forest	Wake Forest (3–0)	Wake Forest (6–1)	Wake Forest (10–1)	Arkansas (13–2)	Arkansas (17–2)	Arkansas (19–3)	Arkansas (23–3)	Arkansas (27–3)	Texas A&M (32–4)	Texas A&M (35–5)	Texas A&M (38–6)	Tennessee (39–9)	Tennessee (42–10)	Tennessee (46–10)	Tennessee (50–11)	Tennessee (60–13)	1.
2.	LSU	LSU (3–0)	LSU (7–1)	LSU (11–1)	LSU (14–2)	Vanderbilt (18–3)	Clemson (21–2)	Clemson (24–3)	Clemson (28–3)	Arkansas (30–5)	Arkansas (34–6)	Arkansas (37–7)	Texas A&M (40–8)	Kentucky (37–11)	Kentucky (39–12)	Kentucky (40–14)	Texas A&M (53–15)	2.
3.	Arkansas	Arkansas (2–1)	Arkansas (5–2)	Arkansas (9–2)	Duke (13–2)	Clemson (17–2)	Oregon State (21–2)	Texas A&M (25–3)	Texas A&M (28–4)	Tennessee (30–6)	Tennessee (33–7)	Tennessee (37–7)	Arkansas (40–9)	Arkansas (42–10)	North Carolina (41–12)	North Carolina (42–13)	Kentucky (46–16)	3.
4.	Florida	Oregon State (3–0)	Oregon State (7–1)	Oregon State (11–1)	Oregon State (15–1)	Oregon State (17–2)	Florida (14–9)	Florida (16–11)	Tennessee (26–6)	Clemson (29–6)	Clemson (32–7)	Clemson (34–9)	Clemson (36–10)	North Carolina (39–11)	Texas A&M (45–11)	Texas A&M (45–13)	North Carolina (48–16)	4.
5.	Oregon State	Florida (0–1)	Florida (5–1)	TCU (12–0)	Texas A&M (16–0)	LSU (17–4)	Texas A&M (21–3)	Tennessee (24–5)	Vanderbilt (25–7)	Florida State (30–5)	Duke (29–11)	Florida State (34–9)	Florida State (35–10)	Texas A&M (42–10)	Arkansas (43–12)	Arkansas (43–14)	Florida State (49–17)	5.
6.	TCU	TCU (3–0)	TCU (7–0)	Florida (8–3)	Tennessee (16–1)	Duke (15–5)	Tennessee (21–4)	Vanderbilt (23–6)	Duke (24–8)	Duke (26–10)	Florida State (31–8)	East Carolina (36–7)	Kentucky (35–10)	Georgia (38–12)	Oregon State (41–13)	Oregon State (42–14)	Florida (36–30)	6.
7.	Vanderbilt	Vanderbilt (2–1)	Tennessee (7–1)	Tennessee (11–1)	Wake Forest (12–3)	Florida State (18–0)	Vanderbilt (19–6)	Duke (20–8)	Florida State (26–5)	Kentucky (30–5)	Kentucky (32–7)	North Carolina (33–11)	East Carolina (37–9)	Wake Forest (36–16)	NC State (32–19)	NC State (33–20)	NC State (38–23)	7.
8.	Tennessee	Tennessee (2–1)	Virginia (7–0)	Virginia (10–1)	Vanderbilt (14–3)	Florida (12–7)	Virginia (19–4)	Florida State (22–4)	Oregon State (26–4)	Oregon State (29–5)	East Carolina (32–7)	Duke (30–14)	North Carolina (35–11)	Oregon State (39–12)	Georgia (40–13)	Georgia (40–14)	Virginia (45–17)	8.
9.	Clemson	Clemson (3–0)	Vanderbilt (5–3)	Vanderbilt (10–3)	Clemson (13–1)	Alabama (17–3)	LSU (19–6)	Oregon State (21–4)	Virginia (24–7)	Virginia (27–8)	Vanderbilt (29–11)	Kentucky (33–9)	Duke (32–14)	NC State (29–19)	Wake Forest (36–19)	Wake Forest (38–20)	Oregon State (45–16)	9.
10.	Virginia	Virginia (3–0)	Clemson (6–1)	Clemson (9–1)	Florida (10–5)	Texas A&M (18–2)	South Carolina (19–5)	Dallas Baptist (23–4)	Kentucky (27–4)	East Carolina (28–7)	Wake Forest (26–13)	Virginia (32–12)	Virginia (34–12)	Clemson (37–13)	Clemson (40–13)	Clemson (41–14)	Georgia (43–17)	10.
11.	Texas A&M	Texas A&M (3–0)	Texas A&M (7–0)	Texas A&M (11–0)	TCU (14–2)	Tennessee (18–3)	Duke (17–7)	Alabama (21–7)	UC Irvine (24–4)	North Carolina (29–7)	Virginia (29–11)	Oregon State (33–10)	Oregon State (35–12)	Florida State (37–12)	Florida State (39–14)	Duke (39–18)	Clemson (44–16)	11.
12.	South Carolina	South Carolina (3–0)	South Carolina (7–1)	Duke (10–1)	South Carolina (13–3)	East Carolina (14–4)	Florida State (19–3)	Virginia (21–6)	East Carolina (24–6)	Alabama (24–12)	North Carolina (30–10)	UC Irvine (32–8)	Mississippi State (32–16)	East Carolina (37–13)	East Carolina (40–13)	Florida State (42–15)	Oregon (40–20)	12.
13.	Texas	Duke (3–0)	Duke (7–0)	South Carolina (8–3)	East Carolina (10–4)	Virginia (15–4)	Wake Forest (16–7)	North Carolina (25–4)	Dallas Baptist (25–6)	Vanderbilt (26–10)	Oregon State (30–9)	NC State (25–16)	NC State (26–18)	Duke (34–16)	Virginia (39–14)	East Carolina (43–15)	West Virginia (36–24)	13.
14.	East Carolina	Texas (2–1)	Texas (6–1)	Texas Tech (9–2)	North Carolina (14–2)	Oklahoma (13–6)	Dallas Baptist (19–4)	UC Irvine (22–3)	North Carolina (26–6)	Wake Forest (24–11)	UC Irvine (28–8)	Vanderbilt (31–13)	Georgia (35–12)	Virginia (36–14)	Mississippi State (36–19)	Virginia (40–15)	Connecticut (35–26)	14.
15.	Stanford	East Carolina (3–0)	East Carolina (5–2)	East Carolina (7–4)	Virginia (12–3)	Wake Forest (13–6)	Alabama (18–6)	South Carolina (21–7)	Mississippi State (21–12)	UC Irvine (25–7)	Coastal Carolina (27–12)	Wake Forest (27–16)	Wake Forest (32–16)	Mississippi State (33–18)	Oklahoma (34–18)	Mississippi State (38–21)	Arkansas (44–16)	15.
16.	Duke	North Carolina (3–0)	Texas Tech (6–2)	North Carolina (10–2)	NC State (12–2)	Mississippi State (15–6)	UC Irvine (18–3)	East Carolina (20–6)	Alabama (22–10)	Oregon (25–10)	Oklahoma (24–14)	Oklahoma State (30–14)	South Carolina (32–15)	Oklahoma (32–17)	Duke (35–18)	Oklahoma State (40–17)	East Carolina (46–17)	16.
17.	North Carolina	Texas Tech (2–1)	North Carolina (5–2)	NC State (9–2)	Auburn (12–3)	Ole Miss (15–6)	Mississippi State (17–8)	Virginia Tech (21–5)	Oregon (22–8)	Oklahoma State (25–11)	NC State (22–15)	Alabama (28–16)	Oklahoma (29–17)	UC Irvine (38–10)	UC Irvine (41–11)	Oklahoma (37–19)	Mississippi State (40–23)	17.
18.	Texas Tech	Iowa (2–1)	NC State (4–2)	Auburn (9–2)	Alabama (15–1)	TCU (15–5)	East Carolina (16–6)	Kentucky (24–4)	Wake Forest (21–10)	West Virginia (22–13)	Oregon (27–12)	South Carolina (29–14)	UC Irvine (34–10)	UC Santa Barbara (35–12)	UC Santa Barbara (39–12)	UC Santa Barbara (42–12)	Oklahoma State (42–19)	18.
19.	Coastal Carolina	NC State (2–1)	Auburn (6–1)	UC Irvine (9–0)	UC Irvine (13–1)	UC Irvine (15–3)	North Carolina (21–4)	Mississippi State (19–10)	UCF (21–8)	South Carolina (25–11)	Oklahoma State (26–14)	Oklahoma (26–16)	UC Santa Barbara (31–12)	Oklahoma State (34–16)	Oklahoma State (36–16)	Arizona (36–21)	Oklahoma (42–19)	19.
20.	Iowa	Auburn (3–0)	UC Irvine (6–0)	Dallas Baptist (10–1)	Dallas Baptist (13–2)	Dallas Baptist (16–3)	Virginia Tech (18–4)	Oregon (19–7)	Virginia Tech (21–8)	Louisiana (28–9)	Alabama (25–15)	West Virginia (26–16)	Oregon (32–15)	Oregon (34–16)	Oregon (37–16)	UC Irvine (43–12)	UC Santa Barbara (44–14)	20.
21.	Oklahoma State	UC Irvine (3–0)	Indiana (6–1)	Alabama (11–1)	Florida State (14–0)	South Carolina (15–5)	Oklahoma (14–9)	NC State (18–7)	Nebraska (22–7)	Coastal Carolina (24–11)	West Virginia (23–16)	Oregon (29–14)	Oklahoma State (32–16)	Arizona (32–18)	Arizona (33–20)	Louisiana (40–18)	Arizona (36–23)	21.
22.	NC State	Indiana (2–1)	Coastal Carolina (5–2)	Coastal Carolina (9–2)	Coastal Carolina (14–2)	Coastal Carolina (17–3)	Ole Miss (17–8)	Nebraska (20–5)	Coastal Carolina (22–9)	NC State (20–13)	South Carolina (27–13)	Louisiana (33–13)	Troy (34–15)	Louisiana (38–15)	Louisiana (40–16)	Southern Miss (41–18)	Kansas State (35–26)	22.
23.	Auburn	Coastal Carolina (1–2)	Dallas Baptist (7–0)	Texas (7–4)	Texas (9–6)	North Carolina (17–4)	Kentucky (20–4)	UC Santa Barbara (15–8)	Oklahoma State (21–11)	Dallas Baptist (26–8)	Arizona (24–14)	Mississippi State (29–15)	Arizona (29–17)	Indiana State (36–11)	Indiana State (39–11)	Dallas Baptist (44–13)	Evansville (39–26)	23.
24.	Northeastern	UCLA (3–0)	Alabama (8–0)	Florida State (10–0)	Texas Tech (11–4)	Campbell (15–4)	Georgia (21–4)	Coastal Carolina (20–7)	Louisiana (24–8)	Lamar (29–6)	Indiana State (29–8)	Indiana State (31–9)	Indiana State (34–10)	Texas (32–30)	Texas (35–20)	Indiana State (42–13)	Duke (40–20)	24.
25.	UC Irvine	Dallas Baptist (3–0)	Campbell (6–1)	Campbell (8–3)	Campbell (11–4)	Southern Miss (14–6)	NC State (15–7)	LSU (20–9)	South Carolina (22–10)	Oklahoma (21–14)	Louisiana (31–11)	UC Santa Barbara (28–11)	Texas (30–19)	Southern Miss (34–17)	Southern Miss (37–18)	Nebraska (39–20)	UC Irvine (45–14)	25.
	Preseason Jan 29	Week 1 Feb 19	Week 2 Feb 26	Week 3 Mar 4	Week 4 Mar 11	Week 5 Mar 18	Week 6 Mar 25	Week 7 Apr 1	Week 8 Apr 8	Week 9 Apr 15	Week 10 Apr 22	Week 11 Apr 29	Week 12 May 6	Week 13 May 13	Week 14 May 20	Week 15 May 26	Final Jun 25	
		Dropped: No. 15 Stanford; No. 21 Oklahoma State; No. 24 Northeastern	Dropped: No. 18 Iowa; No. 24 UCLA	Dropped: No. 21 Indiana	None	Dropped: No. 16 NC State; No. 17 Auburn; No. 23 Texas; No. 24 Texas Tech	Dropped: No. 18 TCU; No. 22 Coastal Carolina; No. 24 Campbell; No. 25 Southern Miss	Dropped: No. 13 Wake Forest; No. 21 Oklahoma; No. 22 Ole Miss; No. 24 Georgia	Dropped: No. 4 Florida; No. 21 NC State; No. 23 UC Santa Barbara; No. 25 LSU	Dropped: No. 15 Mississippi State; No. 19 UCF; No. 20 Virginia Tech; No. 21 Nebraska	Dropped: No. 23 Dallas Baptist; No. 24 Lamar	Dropped: No. 15 Coastal Carolina; No. 23 Arizona	Dropped: No. 14 Vanderbilt; No. 17 Alabama; No. 20 West Virginia; No. 22 Louisiana	Dropped: No. 16 South Carolina; No. 22 Troy	None	Dropped: No. 20 Oregon; No. 24 Texas	Dropped: No. 9 Wake Forest; No. 21 Louisiana; No. 22 Southern Miss; No. 23 Dallas Baptist; No. 24 Indiana State; No. 25 Nebraska	

== Perfect Game ==
	Preseason Jan 5	Week 1 Feb 19	Week 2 Feb 26	Week 3 Mar 4	Week 4 Mar 11	Week 5 Mar 18	Week 6 Mar 25	Week 7 Apr 1	Week 8 Apr 8	Week 9 Apr 15	Week 10 Apr 22	Week 11 Apr 29	Week 12 May 6	Week 13 May 13	Week 14 May 20	Week 15 Jun 4	Final Jun 26	
1.	Wake Forest	Wake Forest (3–0)	Wake Forest (6–1)	Wake Forest (10–1)	Arkansas (13–2)	Arkansas (17–2)	Arkansas (19–3)	Arkansas (22–3)	Arkansas (27–3)	Texas A&M (32–4)	Texas A&M (35–5)	Texas A&M (38–6)	Tennessee (39–9)	Tennessee (42–10)	Tennessee (46–10)	Tennessee (53–11)	Tennessee (60–13)	1.
2.	Arkansas	Arkansas (2–1)	Arkansas (5–2)	Arkansas (9–2)	LSU (14–2)	Oregon State (17–2)	Clemson (22–2)	Clemson (24–3)	Clemson (28–3)	Arkansas (30–5)	Arkansas (34–6)	Arkansas (37–7)	Texas A&M (40–8)	Kentucky (37–11)	Kentucky (39–12)	Kentucky (43–14)	Texas A&M (53–15)	2.
3.	LSU	LSU (3–0)	LSU (7–1)	LSU (11–1)	Texas A&M (16–0)	Vanderbilt (18–3)	Oregon State (21–2)	Texas A&M (25–3)	Texas A&M (28–4)	Tennessee (30–6)	Tennessee (33–7)	Tennessee (37–7)	Clemson (35–10)	Arkansas (42–10)	North Carolina (41–12)	North Carolina (45–14)	Florida State (49–17)	3.
4.	Florida	Texas A&M (3–0)	Texas A&M (7–0)	Texas A&M (11–0)	Oregon State (15–1)	Clemson (16–2)	Florida (14–9)	Oregon State (21–4)	Oregon State (26–4)	Oregon State (29–5)	Clemson (32–7)	Clemson (34–9)	Kentucky (35–10)	Oregon State (39–12)	Oregon State (41–13)	Oregon State (45–14)	Florida (36–30)	4.
5.	TCU	TCU (3–0)	TCU (7–0)	TCU (12–0)	Duke (13–2)	LSU (17–4)	Texas A&M (19–3)	Tennessee (24–5)	Tennessee (26–6)	Clemson (28–6)	Duke (29–11)	East Carolina (35–8)	Arkansas (40–9)	Georgia (38–12)	Texas A&M (44–11)	Texas A&M (47–13)	Kentucky (46–16)	5.
6.	Vanderbilt	Florida (0–1)	Florida (5–1)	Oregon State (11–1)	Wake Forest (12–3)	Florida (12–7)	Tennessee (21–4)	Florida (16–11)	Vanderbilt (25–7)	Florida State (30–5)	East Carolina (31–8)	Florida State (34–9)	East Carolina (37–8)	North Carolina (39–11)	Clemson (40–13)	Clemson (44–14)	North Carolina (48–16)	6.
7.	Texas A&M	Vanderbilt (2–1)	Oregon State (7–1)	Tennessee (11–1)	Tennessee (16–1)	Texas A&M (18–2)	Dallas Baptist (19–4)	Dallas Baptist (24–3)	Duke (24–8)	Kentucky (30–5)	Wake Forest (26–13)	Oregon State (33–10)	Florida State (35–10)	Wake Forest (36–16)	Arkansas (43–12)	Georgia (42–15)	NC State (38–23)	7.
8.	Texas	Oregon State (3–0)	Texas (6–1)	Florida (8–3)	Vanderbilt (14–3)	Florida State (18–0)	Vanderbilt (19–6)	Vanderbilt (23–6)	Florida State (26–5)	Duke (26–10)	Kentucky (32–7)	Duke (30–14)	Oregon State (35–12)	Texas A&M (42–10)	Georgia (39–14)	Florida State (45–15)	Virginia (46–17)	8.
9.	Oregon State	Texas (2–1)	Virginia (7–0)	Vanderbilt (10–3)	TCU (14–2)	Duke (15–5)	LSU (19–6)	Duke (20–8)	Kentucky (27–4)	Virginia (28–8)	Vanderbilt (29–11)	Virginia (33–12)	Duke (32–14)	Clemson (37–13)	UC Santa Barbara (39–12)	NC State (36–20)	Clemson (44–16)	9.
10.	Virginia	Virginia (3–0)	Tennessee (7–1)	Virginia (10–1)	Clemson (13–1)	Dallas Baptist (16–3)	Virginia (20–4)	North Carolina (25–4)	Virginia (25–7)	North Carolina (29–7)	Florida State (31–8)	UC Irvine (32–8)	Virginia (35–12)	UC Santa Barbara (35–12)	Florida State (39–14)	Virginia (44–15)	Georgia (43–17)	10.
11.	Tennessee	Tennessee (2–1)	Vanderbilt (5–3)	Duke (10–1)	Florida (10–5)	Alabama (17–3)	Duke (17–7)	Florida State (22–4)	Dallas Baptist (25–6)	East Carolina (27–8)	Oregon State (30–9)	Kentucky (33–9)	Georgia (35–12)	Florida State (37–12)	NC State (32–19)	Oregon (40–18)	Evansville (39–26)	11.
12.	Stanford	South Carolina (3–0)	Duke (7–0)	Clemson (9–1)	Auburn (12–3)	Tennessee (18–3)	Florida State (19–3)	Kentucky (24–4)	North Carolina (26–6)	Vanderbilt (26–10)	Coastal Carolina (27–12)	North Carolina (33–11)	North Carolina (35–11)	UC Irvine (38–10)	Virginia (40–14)	Kansas State (35–24)	Oregon State (45–16)	12.
13.	South Carolina	North Carolina (3–0)	South Carolina (7–1)	Auburn (9–2)	Dallas Baptist (13–2)	East Carolina (14–4)	Wake Forest (16–7)	Virginia (22–6)	East Carolina (23–7)	Wake Forest (24–11)	Virginia (30–11)	Wake Forest (27–16)	Wake Forest (31–16)	Duke (34–16)	UC Irvine (41–11)	West Virginia (36–22)	Kansas State (35–26)	13.
14.	North Carolina	Auburn (3–0)	Auburn (6–1)	Texas (7–4)	Texas (9–6)	Coastal Carolina (14–4)	North Carolina (21–4)	Virginia Tech (21–5)	UC Irvine (24–4)	Indiana State (27–7)	Indiana State (29–8)	Indiana State (31–9)	Indiana State (34–10)	Indiana State (36–11)	Indiana State (39–11)	Florida (32–28)	Oregon (40–20)	14.
15.	Auburn	East Carolina (3–0)	East Carolina (5–2)	East Carolina (7–4)	East Carolina (10–4)	Virginia (16–4)	Kentucky (20–4)	Alabama (21–7)	Wake Forest (22–10)	Oklahoma State (25–11)	North Carolina (30–10)	Alabama (28–16)	UC Santa Barbara (31–12)	Virginia (37–14)	East Carolina (40–13)	Connecticut (35–24)	West Virginia (36–24)	15.
16.	Iowa	UCLA (3–0)	Clemson (6–1)	North Carolina (10–2)	North Carolina (14–2)	Wake Forest (13–6)	Alabama (18–6)	LSU (20–9)	Florida (17–14)	Louisiana (28–9)	UC Irvine (28–8)	Vanderbilt (31–13)	South Carolina (32–15)	East Carolina (37–13)	Duke (35–18)	Evansville (38–24)	Connecticut (35–26)	16.
17.	East Carolina	Duke (3–0)	North Carolina (5–2)	Dallas Baptist (10–1)	Virginia (14–3)	Auburn (13–6)	Virginia Tech (18–4)	Indiana State (21–5)	UCF (21–8)	Alabama (24–12)	Arizona (24–14)	UC Santa Barbara (28–11)	UC Irvine (34–10)	San Diego (37–13)	Wake Forest (36–19)	Arizona (36–23)	Arizona (36–23)	17.
18.	UCLA	Clemson (3–0)	Dallas Baptist (7–0)	South Carolina (8–3)	South Carolina (13–3)	Oklahoma (13–6)	South Carolina (19–5)	East Carolina (20–6)	Indiana State (23–7)	UC Irvine (25–7)	Georgia (29–10)	Oklahoma State (30–14)	Texas (30–19)	Texas (32–20)	San Diego (37–13)	Arkansas (44–16)	Arkansas (44–16)	18.
19.	NC State	Iowa (2–1)	Indiana (6–1)	Florida State (10–0)	Florida State (14–0)	Campbell (15–4)	East Carolina (16–6)	UC Irvine (22–3)	Virginia Tech (21–8)	Arizona (21–13)	Alabama (25–15)	Georgia (31–12)	San Diego (33–13)	Oklahoma State (34–16)	Texas (35–20)	UC Santa Barbara (44–14)	UC Santa Barbara (44–14)	19.
20.	Kansas State	NC State (2–1)	Florida State (7–0)	NC State (9–2)	NC State (12–2)	UC Santa Barbara (12–5)	UC Irvine (18–3)	UCF (18–7)	Oklahoma State (21–11)	Dallas Baptist (26–8)	UC Santa Barbara (25–10)	Louisiana (33–13)	Mississippi State (32–16)	Oklahoma (32–17)	Oklahoma State (36–16)	Duke (40–20)	Duke (40–20)	20.
21.	Clemson	Kansas State (2–1)	NC State (4–2)	Alabama (11–1)	Alabama (15–1)	TCU (15–5)	Auburn (15–8)	NC State (18–7)	Louisiana (24–8)	West Virginia (22–13)	Louisiana (31–11)	South Carolina (29–14)	Oklahoma State (32–16)	Alabama (32–19)	Oklahoma (34–18)	San Diego (41–15)	San Diego (41–15)	21.
22.	Oklahoma State	Cal State Fullerton (2–1)	Alabama (8–0)	UC Irvine (10–0)	UC Irvine (13–1)	North Carolina (17–4)	Coastal Carolina (18–6)	Coastal Carolina (20–7)	Coastal Carolina (22–9)	Coastal Carolina (24–11)	Oklahoma State (25–15)	San Diego (30–12)	Alabama (28–18)	NC State (29–19)	Mississippi State (36–19)	Oklahoma State (42–19)	Oklahoma State (42–19)	22.
23.	Duke	Stanford (1–2)	Coastal Carolina (5–2)	Coastal Carolina (9–2)	Coastal Carolina (14–2)	UC Irvine (15–3)	Oklahoma (14–9)	South Carolina (21–7)	Mississippi State (21–12)	Oregon (25–10)	Oklahoma (24–14)	Mississippi State (29–15)	UNC Wilmington (32–16)	Mississippi State (33–18)	Louisiana Tech (41–15)	Oklahoma (40–21)	Oklahoma (40–21)	23.
24.	UC Santa Barbara	Dallas Baptist (3–0)	Indiana State (7–0)	Texas Tech (9–2)	Campbell (11–4)	Kentucky (17–3)	Campbell (17–6)	Wake Forest (17–10)	Alabama (22–10)	Virginia Tech (23–10)	UNC Wilmington (26–14)	UNC Wilmington (28–16)	Troy (34–15)	UNC Wilmington (35–17)	Dallas Baptist (40–13)	East Carolina (46–17)	East Carolina (46–17)	24.
25.	Coastal Carolina	Alabama (3–0)	UCLA (3–3)	Kentucky (10–1)	California (11–3)	Southern Miss (14–6)	Kansas State (17–6)	Nebraska (20–5)	Nebraska (22–7)	Lamar (29–6)	NC State (22–15)	NC State (25–16)	NC State (26–18)	Dallas Baptist (38–12)	Southern Miss (37–18)	Southern Miss (43–20)	Southern Miss (43–20)	25.
	Preseason Jan 5	Week 1 Feb 19	Week 2 Feb 26	Week 3 Mar 4	Week 4 Mar 11	Week 5 Mar 18	Week 6 Mar 25	Week 7 Apr 1	Week 8 Apr 8	Week 9 Apr 15	Week 10 Apr 22	Week 11 Apr 29	Week 12 May 6	Week 13 May 13	Week 14 May 20	Week 15 Jun 4	Final Jun 26	
		Dropped: No. 22 Oklahoma State; No. 24 UC Santa Barbara; No. 25 Coastal Carolina	Dropped: No. 19 Iowa; No. 21 Kansas State; No. 22 Cal State Fullerton; No. 23 Stanford	Dropped: No. 19 Indiana; No. 24 Indiana State; No. 25 UCLA	Dropped: No. 24 Texas Tech; No. 25 Kentucky	Dropped: No. 14 Texas; No. 18 South Carolina; No. 20 NC State; No. 25 California	Dropped: No. 20 UC Santa Barbara; No. 21 TCU; No. 25 Southern Miss	Dropped: No. 21 Auburn; No. 23 Oklahoma; No. 24 Campbell; No. 25 Kansas State	Dropped: No. 16 LSU; No. 21 NC State; No. 23 South Carolina	Dropped: No. 16 Florida; No. 17 UCF; No. 23 Mississippi State; No. 25 Nebraska	Dropped: No. 20 Dallas Baptist; No. 21 West Virginia; No. 23 Oregon; No. 24 Virginia Tech; No. 25 Lamar	Dropped: No. 12 Coastal Carolina; No. 17 Arizona; No. 23 Oklahoma	Dropped: No. 16 Vanderbilt; No. 20 Louisiana	Dropped: No. 16 South Carolina; No. 24 Troy	Dropped: No. 21 Alabama; No. 24 UNC Wilmington	Dropped: No. 13 UC Irvine; No. 14 Indiana State; No. 17 Wake Forest; No. 19 Texas; No. 22 Mississippi State; No. 23 Louisiana Tech; No. 24 Dallas Baptist	None	

== NCBWA ==
	Preseason Feb 1	Week 1 Feb 19	Week 2 Feb 26	Week 3 Mar 4	Week 4 Mar 11	Week 5 Mar 18	Week 6 Mar 25	Week 7 Apr 1	Week 8 Apr 8	Week 9 Apr 15	Week 10 Apr 22	Week 11 Apr 29	Week 12 May 6	Week 13 May 13	Week 14 May 20	Week 15 May 27	Week 16 Jun 4	Final Jun 25	
1.	Wake Forest	Wake Forest (3–0)	Wake Forest (6–1)	Wake Forest (10–1)	Oregon State (14–1)	Arkansas (17–2)	Arkansas (19–3)	Arkansas (23–3)	Arkansas (27–3)	Texas A&M (32–4)	Texas A&M (35–5)	Texas A&M (38–6)	Tennessee (39–9)	Tennessee (42–10)	Tennessee (46–10)	Tennessee (50–11)	Tennessee (53–11)	Tennessee (60–13)	1.
2.	LSU	LSU (3–0)	LSU (7–1)	LSU (11–1)	Arkansas (13–2)	Oregon State (17–2)	Oregon State (21–2)	Clemson (24–3)	Clemson (28–3)	Tennessee (30–6)	Arkansas (34–6)	Arkansas (37–7)	Texas A&M (40–8)	Arkansas (42–10)	Kentucky (39–12)	Kentucky (40–14)	Kentucky (43–14)	Texas A&M (53–15)	2.
3.	Florida	TCU (3–0)	TCU (7–0)	TCU (12–0)	LSU (14–2)	Clemson (17–2)	Clemson (22–2)	Texas A&M (25–3)	Texas A&M (28–4)	Arkansas (30–5)	Tennessee (33–7)	Tennessee (37–7)	Clemson (36–10)	Kentucky (37–11)	Texas A&M (44–11)	Texas A&M (44–13)	Texas A&M (47–13)	Florida State (49–17)	3.
4.	Arkansas	Oregon State (3–0)	Oregon State (7–1)	Arkansas (9–2)	Texas A&M (16–0)	Vanderbilt (18–3)	Texas A&M (21–3)	Tennessee (24–5)	Tennessee (26–6)	Kentucky (30–5)	Clemson (32–7)	Clemson (34–9)	Arkansas (40–9)	Texas A&M (42–10)	Clemson (40–13)	North Carolina (42–13)	North Carolina (45–14)	Kentucky (46–16)	4.
5.	Tennessee	Arkansas (2–1)	Arkansas (5–2)	Oregon State (11–1)	Tennessee (16–1)	LSU (17–4)	Tennessee (21–4)	Oregon State (21–4)	Oregon State (26–4)	Oregon State (29–5)	Duke (29–11)	East Carolina (35–8)	Kentucky (35–10)	North Carolina (39–11)	Arkansas (43–12)	Arkansas (43–14)	Clemson (44–14)	Florida (36–30)	5.
6.	TCU	Florida (0–1)	Florida (5–1)	Texas A&M (11–0)	Wake Forest (12–3)	Texas A&M (18–2)	Virginia (20–4)	Vanderbilt (23–6)	Vanderbilt (25–7)	Clemson (29–6)	Kentucky (32–7)	Florida State (34–9)	East Carolina (37–9)	Oregon State (39–12)	North Carolina (41–12)	Clemson (41–12)	Florida State (45–15)	North Carolina (48–16)	6.
7.	Vanderbilt	Tennessee (2–1)	Tennessee (7–1)	Tennessee (11–1)	Duke (13–2)	Tennessee (18–3)	LSU (19–6)	North Carolina (25–4)	Duke (24–8)	Florida State (30–5)	East Carolina (31–8)	Oregon State (33–10)	Florida State (35–10)	Clemson (37–13)	Oregon State (41–13)	Florida State (41–13)	Oregon State (45–14)	Virginia (44–15)	7.
8.	Oregon State	Clemson (3–0)	Texas A&M (7–0)	Florida (8–3)	Clemson (13–1)	Alabama (17–3)	Florida (14–9)	Dallas Baptist (23–4)	Kentucky (27–4)	Duke (26–10)	Florida State (31–8)	Kentucky (33–9)	Virginia (35–12)	Wake Forest (36–16)	Florida State (39–14)	Oregon State (41–14)	Georgia (42–15)	NC State (38–23)	8.
9.	Texas	Texas A&M (3–0)	Duke (7–0)	Clemson (9–2)	TCU (14–2)	Duke (15–5)	Vanderbilt (19–6)	Duke (20–8)	Virginia (25–7)	East Carolina (27–8)	Wake Forest (26–13)	North Carolina (33–11)	Oregon State (35–12)	Georgia (38–12)	Georgia (39–14)	Georgia (39–15)	Virginia (44–15)	Clemson (44–16)	9.
10.	Texas A&M	Vanderbilt (2–1)	Virginia (7–0)	Duke (10–1)	Vanderbilt (14–3)	Florida (12–7)	Wake Forest (16–7)	Florida (16–11)	East Carolina (23–7)	Virginia (28–8)	Vanderbilt (29–11)	Virginia (33–12)	North Carolina (35–11)	Florida State (37–12)	Virginia (40–14)	Duke (39–18)	NC State (36–20)	Oregon State (45–16)	10.
11.	Virginia	Virginia (3–0)	Clemson (6–1)	Virginia (10–1)	North Carolina (14–2)	Florida State (18–0)	North Carolina (21–4)	Virginia (22–6)	Florida State (26–5)	North Carolina (29–7)	Oregon State (30–9)	UC Irvine (32–8)	Duke (32–14)	Duke (34–16)	East Carolina (40–13)	Virginia (41–15)	Oregon (42–18)	Georgia (43–17)	11.
12.	Clemson	Duke (3–0)	East Carolina (5–2)	Vanderbilt (10–3)	NC State (12–2)	Virginia (16–4)	Dallas Baptist (19–4)	Florida State (22–4)	Dallas Baptist (25–6)	Wake Forest (24–11)	Virginia (30–11)	Duke (30–14)	Wake Forest (32–16)	Virginia (37–14)	Oklahoma (34–18)	Oklahoma State (40–17)	West Virginia (36–22)	Oregon (40–20)	12.
13.	East Carolina	East Carolina (3–0)	Vanderbilt (5–3)	Alabama (11–1)	Alabama (15–1)	Coastal Carolina (17–3)	Duke (17–7)	East Carolina (20–6)	North Carolina (26–6)	Vanderbilt (26–10)	Coastal Carolina (27–12)	Vanderbilt (31–13)	South Carolina (32–15)	UC Irvine (38–10)	UC Irvine (41–11)	East Carolina (43–15)	Florida (32–28)	West Virginia (36–24)	13.
14.	Duke	North Carolina (3–0)	Texas (6–1)	North Carolina (10–2)	East Carolina (10–4)	East Carolina (14–4)	East Carolina (16–6)	Alabama (21–7)	UC Irvine (24–4)	Oregon (25–10)	North Carolina (30–10)	South Carolina (29–14)	Georgia (35–12)	East Carolina (37–13)	NC State (32–19)	Oklahoma (37–19)	Connecticut (35–24)	Connecticut (35–26)	14.
15.	South Carolina	Texas (2–1)	Alabama (8–0)	NC State (9–2)	Florida (10–5)	Wake Forest (13–6)	Florida State (19–3)	Kentucky (24–4)	Wake Forest (21–10)	Alabama (24–12)	UC Irvine (28–8)	Wake Forest (27–15)	Mississippi State (32–16)	Oklahoma (32–17)	UC Santa Barbara (38–12)	NC State (33–20)	Kansas State (35–24)	Evansville (39–26)	15.
16.	North Carolina	South Carolina (3–0)	North Carolina (5–2)	East Carolina (7–4)	Virginia (13–3)	Dallas Baptist (16–3)	South Carolina (19–5)	Virginia Tech (21–5)	UCF (21–8)	Louisiana (28–9)	Louisiana (31–11)	Oklahoma State (30–14)	UC Irvine (34–10)	Arizona (31–18)	Mississippi State (36–19)	UC Santa Barbara (42–12)	Evansville (38–24)	Kansas State (35–26)	16.
17.	Stanford	NC State (2–1)	South Carolina (7–1)	Texas Tech (9–2)	Coastal Carolina (14–2)	North Carolina (17–4)	Alabama (18–6)	UC Irvine (22–3)	Coastal Carolina (22–9)	Oklahoma State (25–11)	Arizona (24–14)	Georgia (31–12)	Indiana State (34–10)	Indiana State (36–11)	Indiana State (39–11)	UC Irvine (43–12)	East Carolina (46–17)	East Carolina (46–17)	17.
18.	NC State	Alabama (3–0)	Texas Tech (6–2)	Dallas Baptist (10–1)	Dallas Baptist (13–2)	TCU (15–5)	Virginia Tech (18–4)	LSU (20–9)	Virginia Tech (21–8)	UC Irvine (25–7)	Oregon (27–12)	Mississippi State (29–15)	Oklahoma (29–17)	Mississippi State (33–18)	Wake Forest (36–19)	Wake Forest (38–20)	Oklahoma State (42–19)	Arkansas (44–16)	18.
19.	Coastal Carolina	UCLA (3–0)	NC State (4–2)	Coastal Carolina (9–2)	Florida State (14–0)	Campbell (15–4)	UC Irvine (17–3)	NC State (18–7)	Oregon (22–8)	Coastal Carolina (24–11)	South Carolina (27–13)	Alabama (28–16)	Arizona (29–17)	UC Santa Barbara (35–12)	Duke (35–18)	Arizona (36–21)	UC Irvine (45–14)	Oklahoma State (42–19)	19.
20.	Texas Tech	Texas Tech (2–1)	Auburn (6–1)	Auburn (9–2)	Auburn (12–3)	UC Irvine (15–3)	Kentucky (20–4)	South Carolina (21–7)	Nebraska (22–7)	South Carolina (25–11)	Oklahoma (24–14)	Indiana State (31–9)	UC Santa Barbara (31–12)	Oklahoma State (34–16)	Oklahoma State (36–16)	Mississippi State (38–21)	Arkansas (44–16)	Oklahoma (40–21)	20.
21.	Iowa	Iowa (2–1)	Indiana (6–1)	Florida State (10–0)	South Carolina (13–3)	Kentucky (17–3)	Coastal Carolina (18–6)	Wake Forest (17–10)	Louisiana (24–8)	Dallas Baptist (26–8)	Georgia (29–10)	Louisiana (33–13)	Oklahoma State (32–16)	NC State (29–19)	Arizona (33–20)	Dallas Baptist (44–13)	LSU (43–23)	UC Irvine (45–14)	21.
22.	UCLA	Auburn (3–0)	Coastal Carolina (5–2)	UC Irvine (10–0)	UC Irvine (13–1)	UC Santa Barbara (12–5)	Georgia (21–4)	Coastal Carolina (20–7)	Alabama (22–10)	Indiana State (27–7)	Indiana State (29–8)	NC State (25–16)	NC State (26–18)	Louisiana (34–15)	Oregon (37–16)	Indiana State (42–13)	Oklahoma (40–21)	UC Santa Barbara (44–14)	22.
23.	Alabama	Stanford (1–2)	Dallas Baptist (7–0)	South Carolina (8–3)	Texas Tech (11–4)	Oklahoma (13–6)	Mississippi State (17–8)	Nebraska (20–5)	Mississippi State (21–10)	Virginia Tech (23–10)	Alabama (25–15)	Arizona (26–16)	Oregon (32–15)	Oregon (34–16)	Louisiana (40–16)	LSU (40–22)	UC Santa Barbara (44–14)	Mississippi State (40–23)	23.
24.	UC Santa Barbara	Kentucky (3–0)	Campbell (6–1)	Texas (7–4)	Texas (9–6)	Mississippi State (15–6)	Kansas State (17–6)	TCU (20–7)	Florida (17–14)	Georgia (27–9)	NC State (22–15)	Oklahoma (26–16)	Troy (34–15)	South Carolina (32–18)	Dallas Baptist (40–13)	Southern Miss (41–18)	Duke (40–20)	Duke (40–20)	24.
25.	Auburn	Dallas Baptist (3–0)	UC Irvine (6–0)	Kentucky (10–1)	Georgia (16–1)	South Carolina (15–5)	NC State (15–7)	Indiana State (21–5)	LSU (21–12)	Arizona (21–13)	Oklahoma State (26–14)	UC Santa Barbara (28–11)	Vanderbilt (32–16)	Alabama (32–19)	Texas (35–20)	San Diego (40–13)	Mississippi State (40–23)	LSU (43–23)	25.
	Preseason Feb 1	Week 1 Feb 19	Week 2 Feb 26	Week 3 Mar 4	Week 4 Mar 11	Week 5 Mar 18	Week 6 Mar 25	Week 7 Apr 1	Week 8 Apr 8	Week 9 Apr 15	Week 10 Apr 22	Week 11 Apr 29	Week 12 May 6	Week 13 May 13	Week 14 May 20	Week 15 May 27	Week 16 Jun 4	Final Jun 25	
		Dropped: No. 19 Coastal Carolina; No. 24 UC Santa Barbara	Dropped: No. 19 UCLA; No. 21 Iowa; No. 23 Stanford; No. 24 Kentucky	Dropped: No. 21 Indiana; No. 24 Campbell	Dropped: No. 25 Kentucky	Dropped: No. 12 NC State; No. 20 Auburn; No. 23 Texas Tech; No. 24 Texas; No. 25 Georgia	Dropped: No. 18 TCU; No. 19 Campbell; No. 22 UC Santa Barbara; No. 23 Oklahoma	Dropped: No. 22 Georgia; No. 23 Mississippi State; No. 24 Kansas State	Dropped: No. 19 NC State; No. 20 South Carolina; No. 24 TCU; No. 25 Indiana State	Dropped: No. 16 UCF; No. 20 Nebraska; No. 23 Mississippi State; No. 24 Florida; No. 25 LSU	Dropped: No. 21 Dallas Baptist; No. 23 Virginia Tech	Dropped: No. 13 Coastal Carolina; No. 18 Oregon	Dropped: No. 19 Alabama; No. 21 Louisiana	Dropped: No. 24 Troy; No. 25 Vanderbilt	Dropped: No. 24 South Carolina; No. 25 Alabama	Dropped: No. 22 Oregon; No. 23 Louisiana; No. 25 Texas	Dropped: No. 18 Wake Forest; No. 19 Arizona; No. 21 Dallas Baptist; No. 22 Indiana State; No. 24 Southern Miss; No. 25 San Diego	None	

The Preseason poll ranked the top 30 teams in the nation. Teams not listed above are: 26. Oral Roberts; 27. Kansas State; 28. Northeastern; 29. Oklahoma State; 30 Southern Miss.

== D1Baseball ==
	Preseason Jan 16	Week 1 Feb 19	Week 2 Feb 26	Week 3 Mar 4	Week 4 Mar 11	Week 5 Mar 18	Week 6 Mar 25	Week 7 Apr 1	Week 8 Apr 8	Week 9 Apr 15	Week 10 Apr 22	Week 11 Apr 29	Week 12 May 6	Week 13 May 13	Week 14 May 20	Week 15 May 28	Final Jun 26	
1.	Wake Forest	Wake Forest (3–0)	Wake Forest (6–1)	Wake Forest (10–1)	Arkansas (13–2)	Arkansas (17–2)	Arkansas (19–3)	Arkansas (23–3)	Arkansas (27–3)	Texas A&M (32–4)	Texas A&M (35–5)	Texas A&M (38–6)	Tennessee (39–9)	Tennessee (42–10)	Tennessee (46–10)	Tennessee (50–11)	Tennessee (60–13)	1.
2.	Florida	Arkansas (2–1)	Arkansas (5–2)	Arkansas (9–2)	LSU (14–2)	Oregon State (17–2)	Oregon State (21–2)	Clemson (24–3)	Clemson (28–3)	Arkansas (30–5)	Arkansas (34–6)	Arkansas (37–7)	Clemson (36–10)	Kentucky (37–11)	Kentucky (39–12)	Kentucky (40–14)	Texas A&M (53–15)	2.
3.	Arkansas	LSU (3–0)	LSU (7–1)	LSU (11–1)	Oregon State (15–1)	Vanderbilt (18–3)	Clemson (22–2)	Texas A&M (25–3)	Texas A&M (28–4)	Kentucky (30–5)	Tennessee (33–7)	Tennessee (37–7)	Texas A&M (40–8)	Arkansas (42–10)	Clemson (40–13)	Clemson (41–14)	Kentucky (46–16)	3.
4.	LSU	Florida (0–1)	Florida (5–1)	Florida (8–3)	Texas A&M (16–0)	Clemson (17–2)	Texas A&M (21–3)	Tennessee (24–5)	Tennessee (26–6)	Tennessee (30–6)	Kentucky (32–7)	Clemson (34–9)	Kentucky (35–10)	Clemson (37–13)	Texas A&M (44–11)	Texas A&M (44–13)	Florida State (49–17)	4.
5.	TCU	TCU (3–0)	TCU (7–0)	TCU (12–0)	Tennessee (16–1)	LSU (17–4)	Tennessee (21–4)	Oregon State (21–4)	Oregon State (26–4)	Oregon State (29–5)	Clemson (32–7)	East Carolina (35–8)	Arkansas (40–9)	Texas A&M (42–10)	Arkansas (43–12)	Arkansas (43–14)	North Carolina (48–16)	5.
6.	Vanderbilt	Vanderbilt (2–1)	Oregon State (7–1)	Oregon State (11–1)	Duke (13–2)	Florida (12–7)	Florida (14–9)	Florida (16–11)	Vanderbilt (25–7)	Clemson (29–6)	Duke (29–11)	Oregon State (33–10)	East Carolina (37–9)	Oregon State (39–12)	Oregon State (41–13)	North Carolina (42–13)	NC State (38–23)	6.
7.	Oregon State	Oregon State (3–0)	Texas A&M (7–0)	Texas A&M (11–0)	Wake Forest (12–3)	Texas A&M (18–2)	Vanderbilt (19–6)	Vanderbilt (23–6)	Duke (24–8)	Duke (26–10)	East Carolina (31–8)	Florida State (34–9)	Oregon State (35–12)	North Carolina (39–11)	North Carolina (41–12)	Oregon State (42–14)	Virginia (46–17)	7.
8.	Texas A&M	Texas A&M (3–0)	Tennessee (7–1)	Tennessee (11–1)	Florida (10–5)	Tennessee (18–3)	LSU (19–6)	Dallas Baptist (23–4)	Kentucky (27–4)	Florida State (30–5)	Wake Forest (26–13)	Kentucky (33–9)	Florida State (35–10)	Wake Forest (36–16)	Oklahoma (34–18)	Oklahoma (37–19)	Florida (36–30)	8.
9.	Tennessee	Tennessee (2–1)	Vanderbilt (5–3)	Vanderbilt (10–3)	Vanderbilt (14–3)	Duke (15–5)	Virginia (20–4)	Duke (20–8)	East Carolina (23–7)	East Carolina (27–8)	Oregon State (30–9)	UC Irvine (32–8)	Duke (32–14)	Georgia (38–12)	East Carolina (40–13)	Florida State (42–15)	Clemson (44–16)	9.
10.	Clemson	Clemson (3–0)	Clemson (6–1)	Clemson (9–1)	Clemson (13–1)	East Carolina (14–4)	Dallas Baptist (19–4)	North Carolina (25–4)	Florida State (26–5)	Virginia (28–8)	Florida State (31–8)	Duke (30–14)	Virginia (35–12)	Florida State (37–12)	Florida State (39–14)	Georgia (39–15)	Oregon State (45–16)	10.
11.	East Carolina	East Carolina (3–0)	East Carolina (5–2)	East Carolina (7–4)	East Carolina (10–4)	Alabama (17–3)	Duke (17–7)	Virginia Tech (21–5)	Virginia (25–7)	North Carolina (29–7)	Vanderbilt (29–11)	Virginia (33–12)	North Carolina (35–11)	Duke (34–16)	Georgia (39–14)	NC State (33–20)	Georgia (43–17)	11.
12.	Duke	Duke (3–0)	Duke (7–0)	Duke (10–1)	TCU (14–2)	Florida State (18–0)	Wake Forest (16–7)	East Carolina (20–6)	UC Irvine (24–4)	Wake Forest (24–11)	UC Irivne (38–8)	North Carolina (33–11)	Wake Forest (32–16)	Oklahoma (32–17)	NC State (32–19)	Duke (39–18)	Oregon (40–20)	12.
13.	NC State	NC State (2–1)	Virginia (7–0)	Virginia (10–1)	NC State (12–2)	Coastal Carolina (17–3)	Virginia Tech (18–4)	Alabama (21–7)	North Carolina (26–6)	Vanderbilt (26–10)	Coastal Carolina (27–12)	Wake Forest (27–16)	South Carolina (32–15)	East Carolina (37–13)	UC Santa Barbara (39–12)	UC Santa Barbara (42–12)	West Virginia (36–24)	13.
14.	Virginia	Virginia (3–0)	NC State (4–2)	NC State (9–2)	Alabama (15–1)	Virginia (16–4)	North Carolina (21–4)	Florida State (22–4)	Wake Forest (21–10)	Louisiana (28–9)	Virginia (30–11)	Oklahoma State (30–14)	Mississippi State (32–16)	Arizona (32–18)	UC Irvine (41–11)	East Carolina (43–15)	Kansas State (35–26)	14.
15.	North Carolina	North Carolina (3–0)	Texas (6–1)	Alabama (11–1)	North Carolina (14–2)	Dallas Baptist (16–3)	East Carolina (16–6)	Virginia (22–6)	Dallas Baptist (25–6)	Oklahoma State (25–11)	North Carolina (30–10)	South Carolina (29–14)	Georgia (35–12)	UC Irvine (38–10)	Mississippi State (36–19)	Arizona (36–21)	Connecticut (35–26)	15.
16.	Texas	Texas (2–1)	Alabama (8–0)	North Carolina (10–2)	Coastal Carolina (14–2)	Wake Forest (13–6)	Alabama (18–6)	UC Irvine (22–3)	Virginia Tech (21–8)	Oregon (25–10)	Arizona (24–14)	Mississippi State (29–15)	UC Irvine (34–10)	Mississippi State (33–18)	Virginia (40–14)	Oklahoma State (40–17)	Evansville (39–26)	16.
17.	UC Santa Barbara	Alabama (3–0)	North Carolina (5–2)	Texas Tech (9–2)	Virginia (13–3)	Oklahoma (13–6)	Florida State (19–3)	Kentucky (24–4)	UCF (21–8)	UC Irvine (25–7)	Louisiana (31–11)	Vanderbilt (31–13)	Arizona (29–17)	NC State (29–19)	Duke (35–18)	Mississippi State (38–21)	Arkansas (44–16)	17.
18.	Coastal Carolina	Iowa (2–1)	Texas Tech (6–2)	Coastal Carolina (9–2)	Auburn (12–3)	TCU (15–5)	South Carolina (19–5)	LSU (20–9)	Oregon (22–8)	Alabama (24–12)	Oklahoma (24–14)	Louisiana (33–13)	Oklahoma (29–17)	Virginia (37–14)	Arizona (33–20)	Virginia (41–15)	Oklahoma (40–21)	18.
19.	Alabama	Texas Tech (2–1)	South Carolina (7–1)	Auburn (9–2)	Dallas Baptist (13–2)	Virginia Tech (14–4)	Coastal Carolina (18–6)	NC State (18–7)	Louisiana (24–8)	Coastal Carolina (24–11)	Oklahoma State (26–14)	Georgia (31–12)	Oklahoma State (32–16)	Oklahoma State (34–16)	Oklahoma State (36–16)	Wake Forest (38–20)	UC Santa Barbara (44–14)	19.
20.	Iowa	UCLA (3–0)	Indiana (6–1)	Dallas Baptist (10–1)	South Carolina (13–3)	North Carolina (17–4)	UC Irvine (17–3)	Coastal Carolina (20–7)	Coastal Carolina (22–9)	South Carolina (25–11)	Georgia (29–10)	NC State (25–16)	Indiana State (34–10)	Indiana State (36–11)	Indiana State (39–11)	Indiana State (42–13)	East Carolina (46–17)	20.
21.	Texas Tech	South Carolina (3–0)	Campbell (6–1)	South Carolina (8–3)	Campbell (11–4)	Mississippi State (15–6)	Mississippi State (17–8)	Wake Forest (17–10)	Oklahoma State (21–11)	Arizona (21–13)	NC State (22–15)	Arizona (26–16)	Troy (34–15)	Louisiana (38–15)	Louisiana (40–16)	UC Irvine (43–12)	Oklahoma State (42–19)	21.
22.	UCLA	UC Santa Barbara (1–2)	Coastal Carolina (5–2)	Campbell (8–3)	UC Irvine (13–1)	Campbell (15–4)	NC State (15–7)	South Carolina (21–7)	Mississippi State (21–12)	West Virginia (22–13)	Oregon (27–12)	Oklahoma (26–15)	Louisiana (34–15)	UC Santa Barbara (35–12)	Wake Forest (36–19)	Louisiana (40–18)	Mississippi State (40–23)	22.
23.	Northeastern	Indiana (2–1)	Auburn (6–1)	UC Irvine (9–0)	Texas (9–6)	Auburn (13–6)	Kansas State (17–6)	Mississippi State (19–10)	Nebraska (22–7)	Virginia Tech (23–10)	Alabama (25–15)	Alabama (28–16)	NC State (26–18)	Oregon (34–16)	Oregon (37–16)	Southern Miss (41–18)	UC Irvine (45–14)	23.
24.	Kansas State	Kansas State (2–1)	UC Santa Barbara (3–3)	Texas (7–4)	Texas Tech (11–4)	UC Irvine (15–3)	Kentucky (20–4)	Nebraska (20–5)	Florida (17–14)	Georgia (27–9)	South Carolina (27–13)	Indiana State (31–9)	Oregon (32–15)	South Carolina (33–18)	Texas (35–20)	LSU (40–21)	Duke (40–20)	24.
25.	South Carolina	Coastal Carolina (1–2)	Dallas Baptist (7–0)	UC Santa Barbara (5–5)	UC Santa Barbara (9–5)	UC Santa Barbara (12–5)	Oklahoma (14–9)	UCF (18–7)	Alabama (22–10)	Dallas Baptist (26–8)	Indiana State (29–8)	Utah (29–13)	UC Santa Barbara (31–12)	Texas (32–20)	Southern Miss (37–18)	Dallas Baptist (44–13)	Arizona (36–23)	25.
	Preseason Jan 16	Week 1 Feb 19	Week 2 Feb 26	Week 3 Mar 4	Week 4 Mar 11	Week 5 Mar 18	Week 6 Mar 25	Week 7 Apr 1	Week 8 Apr 8	Week 9 Apr 15	Week 10 Apr 22	Week 11 Apr 29	Week 12 May 6	Week 13 May 13	Week 14 May 20	Week 15 May 28	Final Jun 26	
		Dropped: No. 23 Northeastern	Dropped: No. 18 Iowa; No. 20 UCLA; No. 24 Kansas State	Dropped: No. 20 Indiana	None	Dropped: No. 13 NC State; No. 20 South Carolina; No. 23 Texas; No. 24 Texas Tech	Dropped: No. 18 TCU; No. 22 Campbell; No. 23 Auburn; No. 25 UC Santa Barbara	Dropped: No. 23 Kansas State; No. 25 Oklahoma	Dropped: No. 18 LSU; No. 19 NC State; No. 22 South Carolina	Dropped: No. 17 UCF; No. 22 Mississippi State; No. 23 Nebraska; No. 24 Florida	Dropped: No. 22 West Virginia; No. 23 Virginia Tech; No. 25 Dallas Baptist	Dropped: No. 13 Coastal Carolina; No. 22 Oregon	Dropped: No. 17 Vanderbilt; No. 23 Alabama; No. 25 Utah	Dropped: No. 21 Troy	Dropped: No. 24 South Carolina	Dropped: No. 23 Oregon; No. 24 Texas	Dropped: No. 19 Wake Forest; No. 20 Indiana State; No. 22 Louisiana; No. 23 Southern Miss; No. 24 LSU; No. 25 Dallas Baptist	
