= Kyle DeBarge =

American baseball player (born 2003)

Minnesota Twins
- Shortstop
- Born: July 15, 2003 (age 23); Lake Charles, Louisiana, U.S.
- Bats: Right Throws: Right

Lance Kyle DeBarge (born July 15, 2003) is an American professional baseball shortstop in the Minnesota Twins organization.

== Amateur career ==
DeBarge grew up in Kinder, Louisiana and attended Alfred M. Barbe High School.

DeBarge batted .293 with three home runs, 30 RBI, and 16 stolen bases during his freshman season with the Louisiana Ragin' Cajuns He batted .371 with seven home runs and 38 RBI during his sophomore season. DeBarge was named the Sun Belt Player or the Year after batting .355 with 21 home runs and 72 RBI as a junior. In 2023, he played collegiate summer baseball with the Falmouth Commodores of the Cape Cod Baseball League.

== Professional career ==
DeBarge was drafted by the Minnesota Twins in the first round, with the 33rd overall selection, of the 2024 Major League Baseball draft. On July 24, 2024, DeBarge signed with the Twins on a $2.4 million contract.

DeBarge made his professional debut with the Single-A Fort Myers Miracle and hit .235 with one home run across 26 games. In 2025, he played with the High-A Cedar Rapids Kernels with whom he batted .237 with eight home runs, 65 RBI, and 66 stolen bases over 121 games. DeBarge was assigned to the Double-A Wichita Wind Surge for the 2026 season and hit .221 with 12 home runs, 49 RBI, and 41 stolen bases across 120 games.
