= 2024 New Orleans Privateers baseball team =

2024 New Orleans Privateers baseball
- Conference: Southland Conference
- Record: 31–26 (14–10 Southland)
- Head coach: Blake Dean (9th season)
- Assistant coaches: Dax Norris; Phillip Hurst; Brooks DuBose – Volunteer Asst
- Home stadium: Maestri Field at Privateer Park

2024 Southland Conference baseball standings
	Conf.				Overall
Team	W		L	PCT	W		L	PCT
Lamar ‍†‍‍	17	–	7	.708	44	–	15	.746
Nicholls ‍‍‡‍^{y}	16	–	8	.667	38	–	22	.633
New Orleans ‍‍‍	14	–	10	.583	31	–	26	.544
McNeese ‍‍‍	11	–	13	.458	32	–	27	.542
Northwestern State ‍‍‍	11	–	13	.458	22	–	33	.400
Southeastern Louisiana ‍‍‍	10	–	14	.417	30	–	28	.517
Texas A&M–Corpus Christi ‍‍‍	10	–	14	.417	22	–	35	.386
Incarnate Word ‍‍‍	10	–	14	.417	26	–	31	.456
Houston Christian ‍‍‍	9	–	15	.375	18	–	31	.367
† – Conference champion ‡ – Tournament champion y – Invited to the NCAA Tournament; As of June 1, 2024; Rankings from D1Baseball

The 2024 New Orleans Privateers baseball team represented the University of New Orleans during the 2024 NCAA Division I baseball season. They played their home games at Maestri Field at Privateer Park and were led by ninth–year head coach Blake Dean. They are members of the Southland Conference. The team compiled a 31–26 overall record and a 14–10 record in conference play finishing in 3rd place. Qualifying for the SLC tournament as the 3rd seeded team, the Privateers were 1–2 in tournament play losing to 6th seeded Southeastern Louisiana 2–10, defeating 7th seeded Texas A&M–Corpus Christi 7–4, and losing again to Southeastern Louisiana 5–11.

== Previous season ==
The Privateers had a regular season record of 36–24 and a conference record of 13–11 finishing in a two way tie for third place in conference play. They participated in the 2023 Southland Conference baseball tournament as the fourth seeded team losing a tie-breaker to Lamar. After defeating third seeded Lamar, and defeating fifth seeded Northwestern State twice, New Orleans advanced to the tournament championship game losing to tournament champion, Nicholls. They compiled a 3–2 conference tournament record losing twice to Nicholls.

== Preseason ==
=== Southland Conference Coaches Poll ===
The Southland Conference Coaches Poll was released on February 8, 2024. New Orleans was picked to finish third in the Southland Conference with 92 overall votes and 3 first place votes.

Coaches poll
Predicted finish	Team	Votes (1st place)
1	Nicholls	126 (14)
2	Lamar	106 (1)
3	New Orleans	92 (3)
4	Incarnate Word	81
5	McNeese	67
6	Texas A&M–Corpus Christi	55
7	Southeastern Louisiana	53
8	Northwestern State	42
9	Houston Christian	26

=== Preseason All-Southland team ===
Miguel Useche, Mitchell Sanford, and Issac Williams were named to the conference preseason first team. Dylan Mach was named to the conference preseason second team.

==== First Team ====
- Edgar Alvarez* (NICH, SR, 1st Base)
- MaCrae Kendrick (NICH, SR, 2nd Base)
- Ethan Ruiz (LU, SR, 3rd Base)
- Parker Coddou* (NICH, SR, Shortstop)
- Miguel Useche (UNO, SR, Catcher)
- Rey Mendoza* (UIW, GR, Designated Hitter)
- Mitchell Sanford* (UNO, RJR, Outfielder)
- Samuel Benjamin* (HCU, SR, Outfielder)
- Issac Williams (UNO, SR, Outfielder)
- Jacob Mayers* (NICH, SO, Starting Pitcher)
- Brooks Caple* (LU, SR, Starting Pitcher)
- Hunter Hesseltine* (LU, JR, Starting Pitcher)
- Gavin Galy* (NICH, RJR, Relief Pitcher)
- Kanin Dodge (LU, SR, Utility)

*-2023 Southland All-Conference Selection

==== Second Team ====
- Cameron Crotte (UIW, SR, 1st Base)
- Austin Roccaforte (LU, SR, 2nd Base)
- Dylan Mach (UNO, SR, 3rd Base)
- Jake Haze* (SLU, GR, Shortstop)
- Bo Willis (NWST, SR, Catcher)
- River Orsak (LU, SR, Designated Hitter)
- Garrett Felix (NICH, SR, Outfielder)
- Cooper Hext (MCNS, SR, Outfielder)
- Christian Smith-Johnson (TAMUCC, SO, Outfielder)
- Chase Prestwich (NWST, JR, Starting Pitcher)
- Isaiah Zavala (UIW, GR, Starting Pitcher)
- Jacob Ellis (LU, SR, Starting Pitcher)
- Jackson Cleveland (LU, JR, Relief Pitcher)
- Isaiah Zavala (UIW, SR, Utility)

*-2023 Southland All-Conference Selection

== Schedule and results ==
Legend
	New Orleans win
	New Orleans loss
	Postponement/Cancellation/Suspensions
**Bold**	New Orleans team member
*	Non-Conference game
†	Make-Up Game

2024 New Orleans Privateers baseball game log
Regular season (30–24)

February (4–4)
Date	Opponent	Rank	Site/stadium	Score	Win	Loss	Save	TV	Attendance	Overall record	SLC Record
Feb. 16	Georgia State*		Maestri Field at Privateer Park • New Orleans, LA	3–12	Jones, Brady (1-0)	**Mercer, Colton (0-1)**	None	ESPN+	478	0–1	
Feb. 17	Georgia State*		Maestri Field at Privateer Park • New Orleans, LA	4–2	**Delorbe, Ryan (1-0)**	Chastain, Davis (0-1)	**Tyson-Long, Kyrin (1)**		236	1–1	
Feb. 18	Georgia State*		Maestri Field at Privateer Park • New Orleans, LA	–	**Seroski, Caleb (1-0)**	Roche, Tyler (0-1)	None	ESPN+	377	2–1	
Feb. 21	Southern Miss*		Maestri Field at Privateer Park • New Orleans, LA	10–15	Adams, Chase (1-0)	**Delorbe, Ryan (1-1)**	None	ESPN+	397	2–2	
Feb. 23	Evansville*		Maestri Field at Privateer Park • New Orleans, LA	10–8	**Tyson-Long, Kyrin (1-0)**	Jakob Meyer (0-1)	**Dennis, Cortez (1)**	ESPN+	335	3–2	
Feb. 24	Evansville*		Maestri Field at Privateer Park • New Orleans, LA	3–2 (10 inn)	**Blasick, Nathan (1-0)**	Jakob Meyer (0-2)	None	ESPN+	386	4–2	
Feb. 25	Evansville*		Maestri Field at Privateer Park • New Orleans, LA	4–18 (8 inn)	Shane Harris (1-1)	Seroski, Caleb (1-1)	None	ESPN+	345	4–3	
Feb. 27	at Tulane*		Greer Field at Turchin Stadium • New Orleans, LA	3–6	Blaise Wilcenski (1-0)	**Dennis, Cortez (0-1)**	Henry Shuffler (1)	ESPN+	1,738	4–4	

March (12–7)
Date	Opponent	Rank	Site/stadium	Score	Win	Loss	Save	TV	Attendance	Overall record	SLC Record
Mar 1	Alabama A&M*		Maestri Field at Privateer Park • New Orleans, LA	14–4 (7 inn)	**Mercer, Colton (1-1)**	Nick Anaya (0-2)	None	ESPN+	322	5–4	
Mar 2	Alabama A&M*		Maestri Field at Privateer Park • New Orleans, LA	4–2	**Edwards, Grant (1-0)**	Anthony Mateo (0-2)	**Tyson-Long, Kyrin (2)**	ESPN+	357	6–4	
Mar 3	Alabama A&M*		Maestri Field at Privateer Park • New Orleans, LA	14–4 (7 inn)	**Seroski, Caleb (2-1)**	Jackson Hall (0-3)	None	ESPN+	388	7–4	
Mar 6	at South Alabama*		Eddie Stanky Field • Mobile, AL	7–5	**Williams, Jack (1-0)**	Cooper Cooksey (1-1)	Tyson-Long, Kyrin (3)	ESPN+	971	8–4	
Mar 8	at Florida State*		Mike Martin Field at Dick Howser Stadium • Tallahassee, FL	0–13	Cam Leiter (3-0)	**Mercer, Colton (1-2)**	None		4,151	8–5	
Mar 9	at Florida State*		Mike Martin Field at Dick Howser Stadium • Tallahassee, FL	7–15	Andrew Armstrong (2-0)	**Edwards, Grant (1-1)**	None		3,932	8–6	
Mar 10	at Florida State*		Mike Martin Field at Dick Howser Stadium • Tallahassee, FL	0–8	Jamie Arnold (4-0)	**Olivier, Chris (0-1)**	None		4,225	8–7	
Mar 13	at Mississippi State*		MGM Park • Biloxi, MS	1–2 (11 inn)	Schuelke, Cam (1-1)	**Byers, Brooks (0-1)**	None		4,009	8–8	
Mar 15	Memphis*		Maestri Field at Privateer Park • New Orleans, LA	4–5	WARREN, DAVID (2-1)	**Mercer, Colton (1-3)**	SANDERS, BRAYDEN (4)	ESPN+	406	8–9	
Mar 16	Memphis*		Maestri Field at Privateer Park • New Orleans, LA	6–1	**Edwards, Grant (2-1)**	ELLIS, LUKE (0-2)	None	ESPN+	546	9–9	
Mar 16	Memphis*		Maestri Field at Privateer Park • New Orleans, LA	10–12	STEPTER, KYLAN (1-0)	**Calloway, Bryce (0-1)**	SANDERS, BRAYDEN (5)	ESPN+	546	9–10	
Mar 20	Jackson State*		Maestri Field at Privateer Park • New Orleans, LA	5–16 (7 inn)	**Byers, Brooks (1-1)**	Lourens, Je-andrick (1-2)	None	ESPN+	368	10–10	
Mar 22	at Nicholls		Ben Meyer Diamond at Ray E. Didier Field • Thibodaux, LA	4–1	**Mercer, Colton (2-3)**	Saltaformaggio, Nico (3-3)	**Blasick, Nathan (1)**	ESPN+	688	11–10	1–0
Mar 23	at Nicholls		Ben Meyer Diamond at Ray E. Didier Field • Thibodaux, LA	12–11	**Delorbe, Ryan (2-1)**	Luke, Haden (0-1)	**Calloway, Bryce (1)**		655	12–10	2–0
Mar 24	at Nicholls		Ben Meyer Diamond at Ray E. Didier Field • Thibodaux, LA	8–5	**Seroski, Caleb (3-1)**	Rodriguez, Arturo (1-2)	**Blasick, Nathan (2)**		501	13–10	3–0
Mar 26	Southern*		Maestri Field at Privateer Park • New Orleans, LA	12–2 (7 inn)	**Williams, Jack (2-0)**	Nick Luckett (0-2)	None	ESPN+	312	14–10	
Mar 28	Incarnate Word		Maestri Field at Privateer Park • New Orleans, LA	12–2 (8 inn)	**Mercer, Colton (3-3)**	Johnson, Dave (2-2)	None	ESPN+	324	15–10	4–0
Mar 29	Incarnate Word		Maestri Field at Privateer Park • New Orleans, LA	0–2	Salinas, Josh (3-0)	**Edwards, Grant (2-2)**	None	ESPN+	308	15–11	4–1
Mar 30	Incarnate Word		Maestri Field at Privateer Park • New Orleans, LA	10–9	**Calloway, Bryce (1-1)**	Walls, Westin (2-3)	None	ESPN+	367	16–11	5–1

April (8–9)
Date	Opponent	Rank	Site/stadium	Score	Win	Loss	Save	TV	Attendance	Overall record	SLC Record
Apr 2	South Alabama*		Maestri Field at Privateer Park • New Orleans, LA	13–3 (7 inn)	**Williams, Jack (3-0)**	Cade Carlson (0-2)	None	ESPN+	365	17–11	
Apr 5	at Houston Christian		Husky Field • Houston, TX	15–4 (7 inn)	**Mercer, Colton (4-3)**	Baumann, Baylor (0-2)	None	ESPN+	183	18–11	6–1
Apr 6	at Houston Christian		Husky Field • Houston, TX	1–7	Edwards, Parker (3-4)	**Edwards, Grant (2-3)**	Willard, Nicholas (1)		213	18–12	6–2
Apr 7	at Houston Christian		Husky Field • Houston, TX	4–11	Gunter, Rye (2-0)	**Dennis, Cortez (0-2)**	None	ESPN+	189	18–13	6–3
Apr 9	Tulane*		Maestri Field at Privateer Park • New Orleans, LA	4–7	Blaise Wilcenski (2-0)	**Usey, Trey (0-1)**	Jacob Moore (4)	ESPN+	618	18–14	
Apr 12	Bluefield State*		Maestri Field at Privateer Park • New Orleans, LA	13–2 (7 inn)	**Mercer, Colton (5-3)**	Will Austin (0-1)	None	ESPN+	298	19–14	
Apr 13	Bluefield State*		Maestri Field at Privateer Park • New Orleans, LA	26–6 (7 inn)	**Edwards, Grant (3-3)**	Zane Eggleston (0-1)	None	ESPN+	322	20–14	
Apr 14	Bluefield State*		Maestri Field at Privateer Park • New Orleans, LA	11–1 (8 inn)	**Seroski, Caleb (4-1)**	Zach Powell (6-3)	None	ESPN+	288	21–14	
Apr 16	at LSU*		Alex Box Stadium, Skip Bertman Field • Baton Rouge, LA	3–6	Christian Little (1-0)	**Usey, Trey (0-2)**	Fidel Ulloa (2)	SECN+	10,324	21–15	
Apr 19	McNeese		Maestri Field at Privateer Park • New Orleans, LA	6–5	**Blasick, Nathan** (2-0)	JT Moeller (2-4)	None	ESPN+	485	22–15	7–3
Apr 20	McNeese		Maestri Field at Privateer Park • New Orleans, LA	17–18	Brian Shadrick (2-0)	**Blasick, Nathan** (2-1)	None	ESPN+	335	22–16	7–4
Apr 21	McNeese		Maestri Field at Privateer Park • New Orleans, LA	6–3	**Edwards, Grant (4-3)**	Alexis Gravel (0-3)	**Dennis, Cortez** (2)	ESPN+	402	23–16	8–4
Apr 23	at Jackson State*		Braddy Field • Jackson, MS	3–10	Spurgeon, Stevins (4-0)	**LeBlanc, Tyler (0-1)**	None		54	23–17	
Apr 26	Texas A&M–Corpus Christi		Maestri Field at Privateer Park • New Orleans, LA	0–2	Watson, Matthew (2-4)	**Mercer, Colton (5-4)**	Hunsaker, Riley (1)	ESPN+	345	23–18	8–5
Apr 27	Texas A&M–Corpus Christi		Maestri Field at Privateer Park • New Orleans, LA	6–11	Soliz, Cam (3-1)	**Edwards, Grant (4-4)**	Thornton, Maddox (6)	ESPN+	357	23–19	8–6
Apr 28	Texas A&M–Corpus Christi		Maestri Field at Privateer Park • New Orleans, LA	5–3	**Dennis, Cortez (1-2)**	Garcia, Zach (4-1)	**Tyson-Long, Kyrin (4)**	ESPN+	695	24–19	9–6
Apr 30	at Southern Miss*		Pete Taylor Park • Hattiesburg, MS	4–5	Allen, Colby (6-2)	**Blasick, Nathan (2-2)**	None	ESPN+	5,200	24–20	

May (6–4)
Date	Opponent	Rank	Site/stadium	Score	Win	Loss	Save	TV	Attendance	Overall record	SLC Record
May 3	at Southeastern Louisiana		Pat Kenelly Diamond at Alumni Field • Hammond, LA	4–3	**Delorbe, Ryan (3-1)**	Polk, Lakin (4-3)	None	ESPN+	1,322	25–20	10–6
May 4	at Southeastern Louisiana		Pat Kenelly Diamond at Alumni Field • Hammond, LA	7–14	Fabre, Larson (2-1)	**Seroski, Caleb** (4-2)	Rodriguez, Jackson (5)	ESPN+	1,485	25–21	10–7
May 5	at Southeastern Louisiana		Pat Kenelly Diamond at Alumni Field • Hammond, LA	7–5	**Olivier, Chris** (1-1)	Vosburg, Aiden (0-5)	**Delorbe, Ryan** (1)	ESPN+	1,264	26–21	11–7
May 7	Tulane*		Maestri Field at Privateer Park • New Orleans, LA	6–5 (10 inn)	**Calloway, Bryce (2-1)**	Tayler Montiel (0-1)	None	ESPN+	1,503	27–21	
May 10	at Northwestern State		H. Alvin Brown–C. C. Stroud Field • Natchitoches, LA	18–15	**Mercer, Colton** (6-4)	Prestwich, Chase (4-6)	None	ESPN+	336	28–21	12–7
May 11	at Northwestern State		H. Alvin Brown–C. C. Stroud Field • Natchitoches, LA	14–6	**Edwards, Grant (5-4)**	Bryan, Tyler (-)	None	ESPN+	412	29–21	13–7
May 13	at Northwestern State		H. Alvin Brown–C. C. Stroud Field • Natchitoches, LA	2–13 (7 inn)	Flowers, Dawson (3-4)	**Dennis, Cortez (1-3)**	None	ESPN+	433	29–22	13–8
May 14	at Southern*		Lee–Hines Field • Baton Rouge, LA			Cancelled					
May 16	Lamar		Maestri Field at Privateer Park • New Orleans, LA	3–12	Caple, Brooks (7-3)	**Mercer, Colton (6-5)**	None	ESPN+	488	29–23	13–9
May 16	Lamar		Maestri Field at Privateer Park • New Orleans, LA	9–10	Cleveland, Jackson (5-0)	**Tyson-Long, Kyrin (1-1)**	Neal, Austin (7)	ESPN+	495	29–24	13–10
May 17	Lamar		Maestri Field at Privateer Park • New Orleans, LA	10–8	**Cortez Dennis (1-3)**	Hunter Hesseltine (6-2)	Bryce Calloway (1)	ESPN+	479	30–24	14–10

Postseason (1–1)

SLC Tournament (1–1)
Date	Opponent	Seed/Rank	Site/stadium	Score	Win	Loss	Save	TV	Attendance	Overall record	Tournament record
May 22	at (6) Southeastern Louisiana	(3)	Pat Kenelly Diamond at Alumni Field • Hammond, LA	2–10	Stuprich, Brennan (6-3)	**Delorbe, Ryan (3-2)**	None	ESPN+	1,487	30–25	0–1
May 23	vs. (7) Texas A&M–Corpus Christi	(3)	Pat Kenelly Diamond at Alumni Field • Hammond, L	7–4	**Olivier, Chris (2-1)**	Hunsaker, Riley (4-5)	None	ESPN+		31–25	1–1
May 24	at (6) Southeastern Louisiana	(3)	Pat Kenelly Diamond at Alumni Field • Hammond, L	5–11	Vos burg, Aiden(1-5)	**Edwards, Grant(5-5)**	None	ESPN+		31–26	1–2

Legend: = Win = Loss = Cancelled
Bold = New Orleans team member
Rankings are based on the team's current ranking in the D1Baseball poll.

Schedule source:
