= 2024 Incarnate Word Cardinals baseball team =

American college baseball season

2024 Incarnate Word Cardinals baseball
- Conference: Southland Conference
- Record: 26–31 (10–14 Southland)
- Head coach: Ryan Shotzberger (5th season)
- Assistant coaches: Greg Evans; Butch Rea; Andrew Stumph - Volunteer Asst
- Home stadium: Sullivan Field

2024 Southland Conference baseball standings
	Conf.				Overall
Team	W		L	PCT	W		L	PCT
Lamar ‍†‍‍	17	–	7	.708	44	–	15	.746
Nicholls ‍‍‡‍^{y}	16	–	8	.667	38	–	22	.633
New Orleans ‍‍‍	14	–	10	.583	31	–	26	.544
McNeese ‍‍‍	11	–	13	.458	32	–	27	.542
Northwestern State ‍‍‍	11	–	13	.458	22	–	33	.400
Southeastern Louisiana ‍‍‍	10	–	14	.417	30	–	28	.517
Texas A&M–Corpus Christi ‍‍‍	10	–	14	.417	22	–	35	.386
Incarnate Word ‍‍‍	10	–	14	.417	26	–	31	.456
Houston Christian ‍‍‍	9	–	15	.375	18	–	31	.367
† – Conference champion ‡ – Tournament champion y – Invited to the NCAA Tournament; As of June 1, 2024; Rankings from D1Baseball

The 2024 Incarnate Word Cardinals baseball team represented the University of the Incarnate Word during the 2024 NCAA Division I baseball season. The Cardinals played their home games at Sullivan Field and were led by fifth–year head coach Ryan Shotzberger. They are members of the Southland Conference. They compiled a 26–31 overall record and finished with a 10–14 record in conference play in a three–way tie for 6th place. The Cardinals qualified for the SLC tournament as the 8th seeded team. The team had a 1–2 record in tournament play defeating 1st seeded Lamar 6–3 and falling to 5th seeded McNeese 2–6 and Lamar 6–18^{(7)}.

== Previous season ==
The Cardinals had a regular season record of 28–26 and a conference record of 14–10 finishing in second place in SLC play. They participated in the 2023 Southland Conference baseball tournament as the second seeded team. The Cardinals were 0–2 in the conference tournament losing to fifth seeded Northwestern State 1–2 and sixth seeded McNeese 0–3.

== Preseason ==
=== Southland Conference Coaches Poll ===
The Southland Conference Coaches Poll was released on February 8, 2024. Incarnate Word was picked to finish fourth in the Southland Conference with 81 votes.

Coaches poll
Predicted finish	Team	Votes (1st place)
1	Nicholls	126 (14)
2	Lamar	106 (1)
3	New Orleans	92 (3)
4	Incarnate Word	81
5	McNeese	67
6	Texas A&M–Corpus Christi	55
7	Southeastern Louisiana	53
8	Northwestern State	42
9	Houston Christian	26

=== Preseason All-Southland team ===
Ray Mendoza was named to the conference preseason first team. Cameron Crotte, Isaiah Zavala, and Grant Randall were named to the conference preseason second team.

==== First Team ====
- Edgar Alvarez* (NICH, SR, 1st Base)
- MaCrae Kendrick (NICH, SR, 2nd Base)
- Ethan Ruiz (LU, SR, 3rd Base)
- Parker Coddou* (NICH, SR, Shortstop)
- Miguel Useche (UNO, SR, Catcher)
- Rey Mendoza* (UIW, GR, Designated Hitter)
- Mitchell Sanford* (UNO, RJR, Outfielder)
- Samuel Benjamin* (HCU, SR, Outfielder)
- Issac Williams (UNO, SR, Outfielder)
- Jacob Mayers* (NICH, SO, Starting Pitcher)
- Brooks Caple* (LU, SR, Starting Pitcher)
- Hunter Hesseltine* (LU, JR, Starting Pitcher)
- Gavin Galy* (NICH, RJR, Relief Pitcher)
- Kanin Dodge (LU, SR, Utility)

*-2023 Southland All-Conference Selection

==== Second Team ====
- Cameron Crotte (UIW, SR, 1st Base)
- Austin Roccaforte (LU, SR, 2nd Base)
- Dylan Mach (UNO, SR, 3rd Base)
- Jake Haze* (SLU, GR, Shortstop)
- Bo Willis (NWST, SR, Catcher)
- River Orsak (LU, SR, Designated Hitter)
- Garrett Felix (NICH, SR, Outfielder)
- Cooper Hext (MCNS, SR, Outfielder)
- Christian Smith-Johnson (TAMUCC, SO, Outfielder)
- Chase Prestwich (NWST, JR, Starting Pitcher)
- Isaiah Zavala (UIW, GR, Starting Pitcher)
- Jacob Ellis (LU, SR, Starting Pitcher)
- Jackson Cleveland (LU, JR, Relief Pitcher)
- Isaiah Zavala (UIW, SR, Utility)

*-2023 Southland All-Conference Selection

== Personnel ==
=== Roster ===
2024 Incarnate Word Cardinals Roster
Pitchers: 5 – Adam Byrd – LHP – junior (6'0, 180); 11 – Larry Westall – RHP – senior (6'4, 185); 17 – Westin Walls – RHP – senior (6'5, 215); 18 – Luis Rodriguez – RHP – senior (6'0, 215); 19 – Garrett Coiner – RHP – sophomore (5'10, 165); 20 – EJ Garcia – RHP – sophomore (5'10, 170); 23 – Braden Berry – RHP – senior (6'3, 230); 27 – Dave Johnson – RHP – (redshirt) junior (6'4, 180); 30 – Thomas Urbina – RHP – junior (6'0, 200); 31 – Danny Davis – RHP – junior (6'6, 215); 34 – Carson Rollins – LHP – junior (6'2, 200); 37 – Sawyer Hansen – LHP – junior (6'1, 180); 38 – Ryan Schlotzhauer – LHP – junior (6'3, 190); 43 – Micah Berens – RHP – junior (6'4, 235)	Catchers: 3 – JD Gregson – junior (6'4, 205); 24 – AJ Herrera – freshman (5'10, 195); 25 – Luca Boscarino – junior (5'10, 195); 37 – Cole Williams – junior (6'2, 210); Infielders: 2 – Grant Randall – senior (5'10, 165); 7 – Tyler Cowan – junior (5'11, 180); 8 – Jayden Ramos – sophomore (5'9, 180); 13 – Cameron Crotte – senior (6'4, 195); 14 – Ryder Hernandez – junior (6'0, 190); 16 – Weldon Sherrell – junior (5'10, 180); 21 – Tony DeJesus – sophomore (6'0, 190); 26 – Matt Crump – (redshirt) junior (6'1, 200); 32 – Matt Marlow – graduate student (5'11, 200); 35 – Ryan Scott – junior (6'2, 225); 40 – Julio Riggs – graduate student (5'9, 175); 41 – Rob Liddington Jr. – junior (6'3, 190)	Outfielders: 1 – Daniel Calabrese – junior (5'11, 170); 4 – Sterling Sutcliffe – senior (6'2, 185); 29 – Sam Tormos – R/R – junior (6'3, 205); 36 – Jacob Caraway – L/L – freshman (6'3, 190); 46 – Matthew Flores-King – R/R – freshman (6'0, 175)

=== Coaching staff ===
Name	Position	Seasons at Incarnate Word	Alma mater
Ryan Shotzberger	Head coach	5	McDaniel College (2004)
Greg Evans	Assistant Coach	5	Ole Miss (1985)
Butch Rea	Assistant Coach	1	Northeastern State
Andrew Stumph	Volunteer Assistant Coach	2	Texas State (2013)
Chance Medina	Director of Player Development	3	Incarnate Word (2021)

== Schedule and results ==
Legend
	Incarnate Word win
	Incarnate Word loss
	Postponement/Cancelation/Suspensions
**Bold**	Incarnate Word team member
*	Non-Conference game

2024 Incarnate Word Cardinals baseball game log
Regular season (25–29)

February (7–2)
Date	Opponent	Rank	Site/stadium Site	Score	Win	Loss	Save	TV	Attendance	Overall record	SLC Record
February 16	Villanova*		Sullivan Field; San Antonio, TX	12–7	**Hargett, Hunter (1-0)**	Rivera, Devin (0-1)	None	ESPN+	215	1–0	
February 17	Villanova*		Sullivan Field; San Antonio, TX	7–6	**Johnson, Dave (1-0)**	Mintz, Ryan (0-1)	None		144	2–0	
February 18	Villanova*		Sullivan Field; San Antonio, TX	9–6	**Berens, Micah (1-0)**	Udell, Cade (0-1)	None	ESPN+	92	3–0	
February 20	at Texas A&M*	8	Olsen Field at Blue Bell Park; College Station, TX	3–9	Cortez, Chris (1-0)	**Johnson, Dave (1-1)**	None	None	4,870	3–1	
February 21	UIC*		Sullivan Field; San Antonio, TX	22–7 (7 inn)	**Beck, Dalton (1-0)**	Smith, Ryan (0-1)	None	ESPN+	53	4–1	
February 23	Alcorn State*		Sullivan Field; San Antonio, TX	14–4 (7 inn)	**Salinas, Josh (1-0)**	Braziel, Kewan (0-2)	None	ESPN+	74	5–1	
February 24	Alcorn State*		Sullivan Field; San Antonio, TX	15–0 (7 inn)	**Zavala, Isaiah (1-0)**	Guershon, Exi (0-2)	None	ESPN+	92	6–1	
February 25	Alcorn State*		Sullivan Field; San Antonio, TX	18–1 (7 inn)	**Schlotzhauer, Ryan (1-0)**	Chirinos, Andres (0-1)	None	ESPN+	94	7–1	
February 27	Tarleton State*		Sullivan Field; San Antonio, TX	10–15	Garza, Grant (2-0)	**Berens, Micah (1-1)**	None	ESPN+	44	7–2	

March (8–9)
Date	Opponent	Rank	Site/stadium	Score	Win	Loss	Save	TV	Attendance	Overall record	SLC Record
March 1	at Louisiana–Monroe*		Lou St. Amant Field; Monroe, LA	5–6	Orton, Carson (2-0)	**Zavala, Isaiah (1-1)**	Nobe		936	7–3	
March 2	at Louisiana–Monroe*		Lou St. Amant Field; Monroe, LA	7–4	**Walls, Westin (1-0)**	Barlow, Cam (0-1)	None		967	8–3	
March 3	at Louisiana–Monroe*		Lou St. Amant Field; Monroe, LA	1–7	Lindsay, Trey (1-1)	**Byrd, Adam (0-1)**	None		961	8–4	
March 5	UT Rio Grande Valley*		Sullivan Field; San Antonio, TX	7–5	**Beck, Dalton (2-0)**	Garza, Randy (0-1)	**Walls, Westin (1)**	ESPN+	45	9–4	
March 6	Prairie View A&M*		Sullivan Field; San Antonio, TX	23–20	**Walls, Westin (2-0)**	Victor Mendoza (0-3)	None	ESPN+	37	10–4	
March 8	Texas Southern*		Sullivan Field; San Antonio, TX	11–4	**Berry, Braden (1-0)**	Dade Hensley (1-3)	None	ESPN+	65	11–4	
March 9	Texas Southern*		Sullivan Field; San Antonio, TX	6–0	**Zavala, Isaiah (2-1)**	Dalton Alford (0-4)	None	ESPN+	195	12–4	
March 10	Texas Southern*		Sullivan Field; San Antonio, TX	11–4	**Johnson, Dave (2-1)**	Josiah Castro (0-3)	None	ESPN+	162	13–4	
March 12	at Texas*	23	UFCU Disch–Falk Field; Austin, TX	1–7	Fontenot, Grant (1-1)	**Beck, Dalton (2-1)**	None		7,211	13–5	
March 19	at UT Rio Grande Valley*		UTRGV Baseball Stadium; Edinburg, TX	4–5	Rodriguez, Nico (2-0)	**Walls, Westin (2-1)**	None	ESPN+	1,612	13–6	
March 22	Texas A&M–Corpus Christi		Sullivan Field; San Antonio, TX	12–2 (7 inn)	**Salinas, Josh (2-0)**	Watson, Matthew (1-3)	None	ESPN+	103	14–6	1–0
March 23	Texas A&M–Corpus Christi		Sullivan Field; San Antonio, TX	5–11	Hunsaker, Riley (3-2)	**Zavala, Isaiah (2-2)**	Hill, Jack (1)	ESPN+	144	14–7	1–1
March 24	Texas A&M–Corpus Christi		Sullivan Field; San Antonio, TX	12–14	Garcia, Zach (2-0)	**Walls, Westin (2-2)**	None	ESPN+	152	14–8	1–2
March 26	at Tarleton State*		Cecil Ballow Baseball Complex; Stephenville, TX	4–8	Burcham, Jake (1-2)	**Smith, Luke (0-1)**	None		403	14–9	
Mar 28	at New Orleans		Maestri Field at Privateer Park; New Orleans, LA	2–12 (8 inn)	Mercer, Colton (3-3)	**Johnson, Dave (2-2)**	None	ESPN+	324	14–10	1–3
Mar 29	at New Orleans		Maestri Field at Privateer Park; New Orleans, LA	2–0	**Salinas, Josh (3-0)**	Edwards, Grant (2-2)	None	ESPN+	308	15–10	2–3
Mar 30	at New Orleans		Maestri Field at Privateer Park; New Orleans, LA	9–10	Calloway, Bryce (1-1)	**Walls, Westin (2-3)**	None	ESPN+	367	15–11	2–4

April (8–9)
Date	Opponent	Rank	Site/stadium	Score	Win	Loss	Save	TV	Attendance	Overall record	SLC Record
April 2	UTSA*		Sullivan Field; San Antonio, TX	4–7	Owens (3-1)	**Walls, Westin (2-4)**	Riojas (5)	ESPN+	88	15–12	
April 5	at Baylor*		Baylor Ballpark; Waco, TX	7–13	Marriott, Mason (1-3)	**Salinas, Josh (3-1)**	None		1,783	15–13	
April 6	at Baylor*		Baylor Ballpark; Waco, TX	3–15	McKinney, Collin (3-3)	**Zavala, Isaiah (2-3)**	None		1,837	15–14	
April 7	at Baylor*		Baylor Ballpark; Waco, TX	14–1 (8 inn)	**Johnson, Dave (3-2)**	Green, Mason (1-4)	None		1,667	16–14	
April 9	at Rice*		Reckling Park; Houston, TX	11–5	**Smith, Luke (1-1)**	Tyler Hamilton (0-4)	**Byrd, Adam (1)**		1,783	17–14	
April 10	at Southern*		Lee–Hines Field; Baton Rouge, LA	–	(-)	**Cancelled**	()			–	
Apr 12	at McNeese		Joe Miller Ballpark; Lake Charles, LA	8–6	**Salinas, Josh (4-1)**	JT Moeller (2-3)	**Rodriguez, Luis (1)**	ESPN+	945	18–14	3–4
Apr 13	at McNeese		Joe Miller Ballpark; Lake Charles, LA	10–3	**Zavala, Isaiah (3-3)**	Zach Voss (0-4)	None	ESPN+	986	19–14	4–4
Apr 14	at McNeese		Joe Miller Ballpark; Lake Charles, LA	10–5	**Johnson, Dave (4-2)**	Alexis Gravel (0-2)	None	ESPN+	989	20–14	5–4
April 16	Texas State*		Sullivan Field; San Antonio, TX	10–8	McCaffety, Rhett (2-0)	**Berens, Micah (1-2)**	None	ESPN+	105	20–15	
Apr 19	Northwestern State		Sullivan Field; San Antonio, TX	6–3	**Davis, Danny (1-0)**	Prestwich, Chase (3-4)	**Byrd, Adam (2)**	ESPN+	75	21–15	6–4
Apr 20	Northwestern State		Sullivan Field; San Antonio, TX	10–6	**Zavala, Isaiah (4-3)**	Marquez, Alejandro (0-1)	None	ESPN+	84	22–15	7–4
Apr 21	Northwestern State		Sullivan Field; San Antonio, TX	5–0	**Hargett, Hunter (2-0)**	Flowers, Dawson (1-3)	**Johnson, Dave (1)**	ESPN+	94	23–15	8–4
April 23	at Texas State*		Bobcat Baseball Stadium; San Marcos, TX	0–10 (7 inn)	Robie, Tony (4-3)	**Garcia, EJ (0-1)**	None		1,777	23–16	
Apr 26	at Lamar		Vincent–Beck Stadium; Beaumont, TX	3–11	Moseley, Kyle (3-0)	**Rodriguez, Luis (0-1)**	None	ESPN+	1,307	23–17	8–5
Apr 27	at Lamar		Vincent–Beck Stadium; Beaumont, TX	2–3	Cleveland, Jackson (4-0)	**Byrd, Adam (0-2)**	Perez, Andres (6)	ESPN+	1,011	23–18	8–6
Apr 28	at Lamar		Vincent–Beck Stadium; Beaumont, TX	2–8	Hesseltine, Hunter (5-1)	**Hargett, Hunter (2-1)**	None	ESPN+	1,009	23–19	8–7
Apr 30	at Prairie View A&M*		John W. Tankersley Field; Prairie View, TX	6–7	Tyson Carlton (2-3)	**Byrd, Adam (0-3)**	None		72	23–20	

May (2–9)
Date	Opponent	Rank	Site/stadium	Score	Win	Loss	Save	TV	Attendance	Overall record	SLC Record
May 3	Nicholls		Sullivan Field; San Antonio, TX	7–6	**Salinas, Josh (5-1)**	Mayers, Jacob (3-1)	**Byrd, Adam (3)**	ESPN+	97	24–20	9–7
May 4	Nicholls		Sullivan Field; San Antonio, TX	6–7	Saltaformaggio, Nico (4-4)	**Johnson, Dave (4-3)**	None	ESPN+	115	24–21	9–8
May 5	Nicholls		Sullivan Field; San Antonio, TX	7–10	Desandro, Devin (5-4)	**Walls, Westin (2-5)**	None	ESPN+	117	24–22	9–9
May 7	at Abilene Christian*		Crutcher Scott Field; Abilene, TX	5–9	Palmer, Blaine (2-0)	**Urbina, Tomas (0-1)**	None	ESPN+	337	24–23	
May 10	Southeastern Louisiana		Sullivan Field; San Antonio, TX	0–9	Stuprich, Brennan (4-3)	**Salinas, Josh (5-2)**	None	ESPN+	113	24–24	9–10
May 11	Southeastern Louisiana		Sullivan Field; San Antonio, TX	7–13	Aspholm, Dalton (2-0)	**Zavala, Isaiah (4-4)**	None	ESPN+	136	24–25	9–11
May 12	Southeastern Louisiana		Sullivan Field; San Antonio, TX	11–12	Polk, Lakin (5-3)	**Berens, Micah (1-3)**	Robb, Carson (1)	ESPN+	153	24–26	9–12
May 14	at UTSA*		Roadrunner Field; San Antonio, TX	3–13 (8 inn)	Beaird, Ryan (2-0)	**Mendoza, Edward (0-1)**	None		682	24–27	
May 16	at Houston Christian		Husky Field; Houston, TX	2–4	Edwards, Parker (5-5)	**Salinas, Josh (5-3)**	Diaz, Christian (2)		113	24–28	9–13
May 18	vs Houston Christian		Vincent–Beck Stadium; Beaumont, TX	3–5	Lopez, Mark (3-0)	**Zavala, Isaiah (4-5)**	None	ESPN+		24–29	9–14
May 18	vs Houston Christian		Vincent–Beck Stadium; Beaumont, TX	14–4	**Berens, Micah (2-3)**	Hamilton, Jackson (1-3)	None	ESPN+		25–29	10–14

Postseason (1–1)

Southland Tournament (1–1)
Date	Opponent	(Seed)/Rank	Site/stadium	Score	Win	Loss	Save	TV	Attendance	Overall record	Tournament record
May 22	vs. (1) Lamar	(8)	Pat Kenelly Diamond at Alumni Field; Hammond, LA	6–3	**Byrd, Adam(1-3)**	Perez, Andres(2-1)	None	ESPN+		26–29	1–0
May 23	vs. (5) McNeese	(8)	Pat Kenelly Diamond at Alumni Field; Hammond, LA	2–6	Alexis Gravel(2-4)	**Zavala, Isaiah(4-6)**	Cameron LeJeune (6)	ESPN+		26–30	1–1
May 24	vs. (1) Lamar	(8)	Pat Kenelly Diamond at Alumni Field; Hammond, LA	6–18 (7 inn)	Hesseltine, Hunter(7-3)	**Berens, Micah(2-4)**	None	ESPN+		26–31	1–2

Schedule source:

*Rankings are based on the team's current ranking in the D1Baseball poll.

== See also ==
2024 Incarnate Word Cardinals softball team
