= 2024 McNeese Cowboys baseball team =

American college baseball season

2024 McNeese Cowboys baseball
- Conference: Southland Conference
- Record: 32–27 (11–13 Southland)
- Head coach: Justin Hill (11th season)
- Assistant coaches: Jim Ricklefsen; Mikey Hoehner; Miles Durham
- Home stadium: Joe Miller Ballpark

2024 Southland Conference baseball standings
	Conf.				Overall
Team	W		L	PCT	W		L	PCT
Lamar ‍†‍‍	17	–	7	.708	44	–	15	.746
Nicholls ‍‍‡‍^{y}	16	–	8	.667	38	–	22	.633
New Orleans ‍‍‍	14	–	10	.583	31	–	26	.544
McNeese ‍‍‍	11	–	13	.458	32	–	27	.542
Northwestern State ‍‍‍	11	–	13	.458	22	–	33	.400
Southeastern Louisiana ‍‍‍	10	–	14	.417	30	–	28	.517
Texas A&M–Corpus Christi ‍‍‍	10	–	14	.417	22	–	35	.386
Incarnate Word ‍‍‍	10	–	14	.417	26	–	31	.456
Houston Christian ‍‍‍	9	–	15	.375	18	–	31	.367
† – Conference champion ‡ – Tournament champion y – Invited to the NCAA Tournament; As of June 1, 2024; Rankings from D1Baseball

The 2024 McNeese Cowboys baseball team represented McNeese State University during the 2024 NCAA Division I baseball season. The Cowboys played their home games at Joe Miller Ballpark and were led by eleventh–year head coach Justin Hill. They are members of the Southland Conference. They compiled a 32–27 overall record and a 11–13 record in conference play to tie for 4th place. Qualifying for the SLC tournament, the 5th seeded Cowboys were 3–2 in tournament play. They defeated 4th seeded Northwestern State 10–5 and 8th seeded Incarnate Word 6–2. The Cowboys were defeated by 1st seed Lamar 9–18 and then defeated Lamar 14–4^{7} to reach the tournament championship game where they were defeated by 2nd seed Nicholls 15–1^{7}.

== Previous season ==
The Cowboys had a regular season record of 35–23 and a conference record of 12–12 finishing in a three way tie for fifth place in conference play. They participated in the 2023 Southland Conference baseball tournament as the sixth seeded team. After winning their first conference tournament game against seventh seeded Texas A&M–Corpus Christi, the Cowboys lost to first seeded Nicholls and defeated second seeded Incarnate Word before being eliminated losing to fifth seeded Northwestern State.

== Preseason ==
=== Southland Conference Coaches Poll ===
The Southland Conference Coaches Poll was released on February 8, 2024. McNeese was picked to finish fifth in the Southland Conference with 67 votes.

Coaches poll
Predicted finish	Team	Votes (1st place)
1	Nicholls	126 (14)
2	Lamar	106 (1)
3	New Orleans	92 (3)
4	Incarnate Word	81
5	McNeese	67
6	Texas A&M–Corpus Christi	55
7	Southeastern Louisiana	53
8	Northwestern State	42
9	Houston Christian	26

=== Preseason All-Southland team ===
Cooper Hext was named to the conference preseason second team.

==== First Team ====
- Edgar Alvarez* (NICH, SR, 1st Base)
- MaCrae Kendrick (NICH, SR, 2nd Base)
- Ethan Ruiz (LU, SR, 3rd Base)
- Parker Coddou* (NICH, SR, Shortstop)
- Miguel Useche (UNO, SR, Catcher)
- Rey Mendoza* (UIW, GR, Designated Hitter)
- Mitchell Sanford* (UNO, RJR, Outfielder)
- Samuel Benjamin* (HCU, SR, Outfielder)
- Issac Williams (UNO, SR, Outfielder)
- Jacob Mayers* (NICH, SO, Starting Pitcher)
- Brooks Caple* (LU, SR, Starting Pitcher)
- Hunter Hesseltine* (LU, JR, Starting Pitcher)
- Gavin Galy* (NICH, RJR, Relief Pitcher)
- Kanin Dodge (LU, SR, Utility)

*-2023 Southland All-Conference Selection

==== Second Team ====
- Cameron Crotte (UIW, SR, 1st Base)
- Austin Roccaforte (LU, SR, 2nd Base)
- Dylan Mach (UNO, SR, 3rd Base)
- Jake Haze* (SLU, GR, Shortstop)
- Bo Willis (NWST, SR, Catcher)
- River Orsak (LU, SR, Designated Hitter)
- Garrett Felix (NICH, SR, Outfielder)
- Cooper Hext (MCNS, SR, Outfielder)
- Christian Smith-Johnson (TAMUCC, SO, Outfielder)
- Chase Prestwich (NWST, JR, Starting Pitcher)
- Isaiah Zavala (UIW, GR, Starting Pitcher)
- Jacob Ellis (LU, SR, Starting Pitcher)
- Jackson Cleveland (LU, JR, Relief Pitcher)
- Isaiah Zavala (UIW, SR, Utility)

*-2023 Southland All-Conference Selection

== Schedule and results ==
Legend
	McNeese State win
	McNeese State loss
	Postponement/Cancelation/Suspensions
**Bold**	McNeese State team member
*	Non-Conference game
†	Make-Up Game

2024 McNeese Cowboys baseball game log
Regular season (29–25)

February (4–5)
Date	Opponent	Rank	Site/stadium	Score	Win	Loss	Save	TV	Attendance	Overall record	SLC Record
Feb. 16	at Texas A&M*	8	Olsen Field at Blue Bell Park • College Station, TX	0–15	Ryan Prager (1-0)	**Voss, Zach (0-1)**	None	SECN+	7,078	0–1	
Feb. 17	at Texas A&M*	8	Olsen Field at Bluebell Park • College Station, TX	1–6	Brock Peery (1-0)	**Abraham, Ty (0-1)**	Zane Badmaev (1)	SECN+	5,818	0–2	
Feb. 18	at Texas A&M*	8	Olsen Field at Bluebell Park • College Station, TX	0–10 (7 inn)	Shane Sdao (1-0)	**Gravel, Alexis (0-1)**	None	SECN+	5,500	0–3	
Feb. 20	Louisiana*		Joe Miller Ballpark • Lake Charles, LA	3–11	Andrew Herrmann (1-0)	**Strmiska, Caleb (0-1)**	None		712	0–4	
Feb. 23	New Mexico State*		Joe Miller Ballpark • Lake Charles, LA	2–1	**Lejeune, Cameron (1-1)**	Trey Meza (1-1)	None		943	1–4	
Feb. 24	New Mexico State*		Joe Miller Ballpark • Lake Charles, LA	7–6	**Morrow, Kainin (1-1)**	Steve Solorzano (0-1)	**Maldonado, Evan (1)**		756	2–4	
Feb. 25	New Mexico State*		Joe Miller Ballpark • Lake Charles, LA	11–8	**Swenson, Max (1-0)**	Hayden Lewis (0-2)	**Lejeune, Cameron (1)**		961	3–4	
Feb. 26	New Mexico State*		Joe Miller Ballpark • Lake Charles, LA	6–5	**Moeller, JT (1-0)**	Saul Soto (1-1)	**Morrow, Kainin (1)**		840	4–4	
Feb. 28	Louisiana Tech*		Joe Miller Ballpark • Lake Charles, LA	4–13	Copeland, Caden (2-0)	**Voss, Zach (0-2)**	None	ESPN+	1,190	4–5	

March (9–7)
Date	Opponent	Rank	Site/stadium	Score	Win	Loss	Save	TV	Attendance	Overall record	SLC Record
Mar 1	Prairie View A&M*		Joe Miller Ballpark • Lake Charles, LA	8–7	**Lejeune, Cameron (2-0)**	Victor Mendoza (0-1)	None		1,711	5–5	
Mar 2	Prairie View A&M*		Joe Miller Ballpark • Lake Charles, LA	19–12	**Barthelemy, Brock (1-0)**	Tyson Carlton (0-1)	None		951	6–5	
Mar 3	Prairie View A&M*		Joe Miller Ballpark • Lake Charles, LA	5–4	**Morrow, Kainin (2-0)**	Victor Mendoza (0-2)	**LeJeune, Cameron (2)**		1,712	7–5	
Mar 6	at Louisiana Christian*		Billy Allgood Field • Pineville, LA	1–0 (10 inn)	**Morrow, Kainin (3-0)**	Cooksey, B. (3-1)	**LeJeune, Cameron (3)**		202	8–5	
Mar 9	at Arkansas*	2	Baum–Walker Stadium • Fayetteville, AR	1–3	Hagen Smith (2-0)	**LeJeune, Cameron (2-1)**	Gabe Gaeckle (3)	SECN+		8–6	
Mar 9	at Arkansas*	2	Baum–Walker Stadium • Fayetteville, AR	1–11 (8 inn)	Brady Tygart (3-0)	**Voss, Zach (0-3)**	Koty Frank (3)	SECN+	11,031	8–7	
Mar 10	at Arkansas*	2	Baum–Walker Stadium • Fayetteville, AR	5–18 (7 inn)	Gage Wood (2-0)	**Morrow, Kainin (3-1)**	None	SECN+	9,296	8–8	
Mar 12	at Southern*		Lee–Hines Field • Baton Rouge, LA	4–3 (14 inn)	**Mott, Marcus (1-0)**	C. Davis (0-1)	Barthelemy, Brock (1)			9–8	
Mar 20	at Louisiana*		M. L. Tigue Moore Field at Russo Park • Lake Charles, LA	1–4	Matthew Holzhammer (2-0)	**Moeller, JT (1-1)**	None	ESPN+	2,912	9–9	
Mar 22	Northwestern		Joe Miller Ballpark • Lake Charles, LA	4–12	MCCLURE, MATT (2-2)	**LeJeune, Cameron (2-2)**	None	ESPN+	973	9–10	
Mar 23	Northwestern		Joe Miller Ballpark • Lake Charles, LA	1–0	Daelan Caraway (2-0)	GARRETT SHEARER (1-4)	None	ESPN+	968	10–10	
Mar 24	Northwestern		Joe Miller Ballpark • Lake Charles, LA	6–3	**JT Moeller (2-1)**	SHEARER, GARRETT (1-4)	None	ESPN+	896	11–10	
Mar 26	Mississippi Valley State*		Joe Miller Ballpark • Lake Charles, LA	6–0	**Abraham, Ty (1-1)**	QUIN BENNETT (0-1)	None		854	12–10	
Mar 28	Northwestern State		Joe Miller Ballpark • Lake Charles, LA	8–2	**LeJeune, Cameron (3-2)**	Newton, Aidan (0-3)	**Morrow, Kainin (2)**		980	13–10	1–0
Mar 29	Northwestern State		Joe Miller Ballpark • Lake Charles, LA	2–6	Bunch, Caleb (1-0)	**Daelan Caraway (1-1)**	None		1,011	13–11	1–1
Mar 30	Northwestern State		Joe Miller Ballpark • Lake Charles, LA	4–10	Marionneaux, Dylan (2-4)	**Abraham, Ty (1-2)**	None		1,059	13–12	1–2

April (8–9)
Date	Opponent	Rank	Site/stadium	Score	Win	Loss	Save	TV	Attendance	Overall record	SLC Record
Apr 2	Alcorn State*		Joe Miller Ballpark • Lake Charles, LA	9–7	**Caraway, Daelan (2-1)**	Nico Garcia (0-1)	**Shadrick, Brian (1)**		864	14–12	
Apr 3	Alcorn State*		Joe Miller Ballpark • Lake Charles, LA	11–4	**Barthelemy, Brock (2-0)**	Kewan Braziel (0-6)	None		872	15–12	
Battle of the Border (Rivalry)
Apr 5	at Lamar		Vincent–Beck Stadium • Beaumont, TX	4–2	**LeJeune, Cameron (4-2)**	Caple, Brooks (4-3)	**Moeller, JT (1)**	ESPN+	1,847	16–12	2–2
Apr 6	at Lamar		Vincent–Beck Stadium • Beaumont, TX	0–1 (11 inn)	Neal, Austin (2-0)	**Caraway, Daelan (2-2)**	None	ESPN+	2,067	16–13	2–3
Apr 7	at Lamar		Vincent–Beck Stadium • Beaumont, TX	3–4	Perez, Andres (2-0)	**Moeller, JT (2-2)**	None	ESPN+	1,377	16–14	2–4
Apr 9	at LSU*		Alex Box Stadium, Skip Bertman Field • Baton Rouge, LA	0–16 (7 inn)	Kade Anderson (3-1)	**Caraway, Daelan (2-3)**	None	SECN+	9,937	16–15	
Apr 12	Incarnate Word		Joe Miller Ballpark • Lake Charles, LA	6–8	Salinas, Josh (4-1)	**Moeller, JT (2-3)**	Rodriguez, Luis (1)	ESPN+	945	16–16	2–5
Apr 13	Incarnate Word		Joe Miller Ballpark • Lake Charles, LA	3–10	Zavala, Isaiah (3-3)	**Voss, Zach (0-4)**	None	ESPN+	986	16–17	2–6
Apr 14	Incarnate Word		Joe Miller Ballpark • Lake Charles, LA	5–10	Johnson, Dave (4-2)	**Gravel, Alexis (0-2)**	None	ESPN+	989	16–18	2–7
Apr 16	Sam Houston*		Joe Miller Ballpark • Lake Charles, LA	5–4	**Shadrick, Brian (1-0)**	Gavi Coldiron (3-3)	**Barthelemy, Brock (2)**		902	17–18	
Apr 19	at New Orleans		Maestri Field at Privateer Park • New Orleans, LA	5–6	Blasick, Nathan (1-0)	**Moeller, JT (2-4)**	None	ESPN+	485	17–19	2–8
Apr 20	at New Orleans		Maestri Field at Privateer Park • New Orleans, LA	18–17	**Shadrick, Brian (2-0)**	Blasick, Nathan (2-1)	None	ESPN+	335	18–19	3–8
Apr 21	at New Orleans		Maestri Field at Privateer Park • New Orleans, LA	3–6	Edwards, Grant (4-3)	**Gravel, Alexis (0-3)**	Dennis, Cortez (2)	ESPN+	402	18–20	3–9
Apr 23	Louisiana Christian		Joe Miller Ballpark • Lake Charles, LA	6–4	**Moeller, JT (3-4)**	Colton Williams (0-2)	None		925	19–20	
Apr 26	Southeastern Louisiana		Joe Miller Ballpark • Lake Charles, LA	9–8	**Abraham, Ty (2-2)**	Fabre, Larson (1-1)	**LeJeune, Cameron (4)**	ESPN+	990	20–20	4–9
Apr 27	Southeastern Louisiana		Joe Miller Ballpark • Lake Charles, LA	3–12	Lee, Dakota (1-3)	**Kainin Morrow (3-2)**	None	ESPN+	1,061	20–21	4–10
Apr 28	Southeastern Louisiana		Joe Miller Ballpark • Lake Charles, LA	9–5	**LeJeune, Cameron (5-2)**	Vosburg, Aiden (0-4)	None	ESPN+	953	21–21	5–10

May (8–4)
Date	Opponent	Rank	Site/stadium	Score	Win	Loss	Save	TV	Attendance	Overall record	SLC Record
May 1	at Houston*		Schroeder Park • Houston, TX	8–9 (10 inn)	Solis, Alex (1-2)	**Maldonado, Evan (0-1)**	None	ESPN+	1,042	21–22	
May 3	at Texas A&M–Corpus Christi		Chapman Field • Corpus Christi, TX	7–3	**Ty Abraham (3-2)**	Dove, Kendall (1-4)	Cameron LeJeune (5)	ESPN+	182	22–22	6–10
May 4	at Texas A&M–Corpus Christi		Chapman Field • Corpus Christi, TX	9–4	**Gravel, Alexis (1-3)**	Hill, Jack (1-4)	None	ESPN+	235	23–22	7–10
May 5	at Texas A&M–Corpus Christi		Chapman Field • Corpus Christi, TX	13–10	**LeJeune, Cameron (6-2)**	Soliz, Cam (3-2)	None	ESPN+	245	24–22	8–10
May 7	Southern*		Joe Miller Ballpark • Lake Charles, LA	14–4 (7 inn)	**Swenson, Max (2-0)**	Genesis Prosper (2-1)	None		922	25–22	
May 10	Houston Christian		Joe Miller Ballpark • Lake Charles, LA	6–2	**Voss, Zach (1-4)**	Edwards, Parker (4-6)	None	ESPN+	933	26–22	9–10
May 11	Houston Christian		Joe Miller Ballpark • Lake Charles, LA	13–6	**Barthelemy, Brock (3-0)**	Gunter, Rye (2-2)	None		1,024	27–22	10–10
May 11	Houston Christian		Joe Miller Ballpark • Lake Charles, LA	7–9	Lopez, Mark (1-0)	**Abraham, Ty (3-3)**	Wells, Jarek (2)		1,024	27–23	10–11
May 14	Texas State*		Joe Miller Ballpark • Lake Charles, LA	7–6 (10 inn)	**Swenson, Max (3-0)**	Holbook, Nicholas (0-1)	None		954	28–23	
May 16	at Nicholls		Ben Meyer Diamond at Ray E. Didier Field • Thibodaux, LA	3–4	Mayers, Jacob (4-1)	**Voss, Zach (1-5)**	Saltaformaggio, Nico (2)	ESPN+	505	28–24	10–12
May 17	at Nicholls		Ben Meyer Diamond at Ray E. Didier Field • Thibodaux, LA	3–10	Desandro, Devin (6-4)	**Gravel, Alexis (1-4)**	None		501	28–25	10–13
May 18	at Nicholls		Ben Meyer Diamond at Ray E. Didier Field • Thibodaux, LA	10–6	**Cameron LeJeune (7-2)**	Hill, Sam (3-2)	**JT Moeller (2)**	ESPN+	613	29–25	11–13

Postseason (3–2)

Southland Tournament (3–2)
Date	Opponent	(Seed)/Rank	Site/stadium	Score	Win	Loss	Save	TV	Attendance	Overall record	Tournament record
May 22	vs. (4) Northwestern State	(5)	Pat Kenelly Diamond at Alumni Field • Hammond, LA	10–5	**Zach Voss(2-5)**	Bryan, Tyler(1-3)	None	ESPN+		30–25	1–0
May 23	vs. (8) Incarnate Word	(5)	Pat Kenelly Diamond at Alumni Field • Hammond, LA	6–2	**Alexis Gravel(2-4)**	Zavala, Isaiah(4-6)	**Cameron LeJeune (6)**	ESPN+		31–25	2–0
May 24	vs. (1) Lamar	(5)	Pat Kenelly Diamond at Alumni Field • Hammond, LA	9–18	Perez, Andres(3-1)	**Brock Barthelemy(3-1)**	None	ESPN+		31–26	2–1
May 25	vs. (1) Lamar	(5)	Pat Kenelly Diamond at Alumni Field • Hammond, LA	14–4 (7 inn)	**Ty Abraham(4-3)**	Morse, Trhea(4-1	None	ESPN+		32–26	3–1
May 25	vs. (2) Nicholls	(5)	Pat Kenelly Diamond at Alumni Field • Hammond, LA	15–1 (7 inn)	Farley, Dylan(3-2)	**Zach Voss(2-6)**	Mone	ESPN+	1,198	32–27	3–2

Legend: = Win = Loss = Canceled
Bold = McNeese team member
Rankings are based on the team's current ranking in the D1Baseball poll.

Schedule source:

== Conference awards and honors ==
=== 2024 All-Southland Conference team ===
Cooper Hext was named to the conference first team. Cooper Hext, Conner Westenburg, and Cameron LeJeune were named the All-Defensive Team.

==== First Team ====
- Miguel Useche (UNO, SR, Catcher)
- Edgar Alvarez (NICH, SR, 1st Base)
- Isaac Webb (TAMUCC, RJR, 2nd Base)
- TJ Salvaggio (SLU, JR, Shortstop)
- Shea Thomas (SLU, SR, 3rd Base)
- Mitchell Sanford (UNO, RJR, Outfielder)
- Samuel Benjamin (HCU, SR, Outfielder)
- Cooper Hext (MCN, SR, Outfielder)
- Dalton Beck (UIW, JR, Designated Hitter)
- Bryce Calloway (UNO, JR, Utility)
- Brooks Caple (LU, SR, Starting Pitcher)
- Colton Mercer (UNO, JR, Starting Pitcher)
- Brennan Stuprich (SLU, RJR, Starting Pitcher)
- Nico Saltaformaggio (NICH, SR, Relief Pitcher)

==== Second Team ====
- ak Skinner (LU, JR, Catcher)
- Brayden Evans (LU, JR, 1st Base)
- Diego Villescas (UNO, JR, 2nd Base)
- Parker Coddou (NICH, JR, Shortstop)
- Sebastian Trinidad (TAMUCC, SR, 3rd Base)
- Reese Lipoma (NWST, JR, Outfielder)
- Basiel Williams (NICH, RSR, Outfielder)
- Cameron Caley (UIW, SR, Outfielder)
- River Orsak (LU, SR, Designaterd Hitter)
- Drake Anderson (NICH, JR, Utility)
- Matthew Watson (TAMUCC, RJR, Starting Pitcher)
- Jacob Ellis (LU, SR, Starting Pitcher)
- Hunter Hesseltine (LU, JR, Starting Pitcher)
- Caleb Bunch (NWST, JR, Relief Pitcher)

==== 2024 All-Southland Defensive team ====
- Miguel Useche (UNO, JR, Catcher)
- Edgar Alvarez (NICH, SR, 1st Base)
- Dalton Hurst (UNO, JR, 2nd Base)
- Kanin Dodge (LU, SR, Shortstop)
- Rocco Gump (NWST, JR, 3rd Base)
- Cooper Hext (MCN, SR, Left Fielder)
- Conner Westenburg (MCN, JR, Center Fielder)
- Mitchell Sanford (UNO, SR, Right Fielder)
- Cameron LeJeune (MCN, RJR, Pitcher)

=== Weekly awards ===
Weekly honors
Honors	Player	Position	Date Awarded	Ref.
SLC Hitter of the Week	Conner Westenburg	OF	February 26, 2024	
SLC Hitter of the Week	Simon Larranaga	IF/DH	May 6, 2024	
SLC Pitcher of the Week	Cameron LeJeune	RHP	May 20, 2024	

== See also ==
2024 McNeese Cowgirls softball team
