= 2024 Southland Conference baseball tournament =

Postseason collegiate baseball tournament

- Teams: 8
- Format: Double-elimination
- Finals site: Pat Kenelly Diamond at Alumni Field; Hammond, Louisiana
- Champions: Nicholls (3rd title)
- Winning coach: Mike Silva (2nd title)
- MVP: Basiel Williams (Nicholls)
- Television: ESPN+

2024 Southland Conference baseball standings
| | Conf. | | | | Overall |
| Team | W | | L | PCT | W | | L | PCT |
|---|---|---|---|---|---|---|---|---|
| Lamar ‍†‍‍ | 17 | – | 7 | .708 | 44 | – | 15 | .746 |
| Nicholls ‍‍‡‍^{y} | 16 | – | 8 | .667 | 38 | – | 22 | .633 |
| New Orleans ‍‍‍ | 14 | – | 10 | .583 | 31 | – | 26 | .544 |
| McNeese ‍‍‍ | 11 | – | 13 | .458 | 32 | – | 27 | .542 |
| Northwestern State ‍‍‍ | 11 | – | 13 | .458 | 22 | – | 33 | .400 |
| Southeastern Louisiana ‍‍‍ | 10 | – | 14 | .417 | 30 | – | 28 | .517 |
| Texas A&M–Corpus Christi ‍‍‍ | 10 | – | 14 | .417 | 22 | – | 35 | .386 |
| Incarnate Word ‍‍‍ | 10 | – | 14 | .417 | 26 | – | 31 | .456 |
| Houston Christian ‍‍‍ | 9 | – | 15 | .375 | 18 | – | 31 | .367 |
† – Conference champion ‡ – Tournament champion y – Invited to the NCAA Tournament; As of June 1, 2024; Rankings from D1Baseball

The 2024 Southland Conference baseball tournament was held from May 22 through 25. The top eight regular season finishers of the league's nine competing teams met in the double-elimination tournament held at Pat Kenelly Diamond at Alumni Field in Hammond, Louisiana. Note: Texas A&M–Commerce did not sponsor a baseball team.

Nicholls, the winner of the tournament, earned the conference's automatic bid to the 2024 NCAA Division I baseball tournament.

== Seeding and format ==
The top eight finishers from the regular season were seeded one through eight. They played a two bracket, double-elimination tournament, with the winner of each bracket meeting in a single championship final. No team received a bye.

== Seeds ==
Teams were seeded by record within the conference with a tie–breaker system to seed teams with identical conference records. The top eight teams in the conference qualified for the tournament.

| Seed | School | Conference | Tie-breaker #1 | Tie-breaker #2 |
|---|---|---|---|---|
| 1 | Lamar | 17–7 | Not needed | |
| 2 | Nicholls | 16–8 | Not needed | |
| 3 | New Orleans | 14–10 | Not needed | |
| 4 | Northwestern State | 11–13 | 2-1 vs McNeese | |
| 5 | McNeese | 11–13 | 1–2 vs Northwestern State | |
| 6 | Southeastern Louisiana | 10–14 | 2–1 vs Texas A&M–Corpus Christi; 3–0 vs Incarnate Word | |
| 7 | Texas A&M–Corpus Christi | 10–14 | 1–2 vs Southeastern Louisiana; 2–1 vs Incarnate Word | |
| 8 | Incarnate Word | 10–14 | 0–3 vs Southeastern Louisiana; 1-2 vs Texas A&M-Corpus Christi | |

Note: Houston Christian with a 9-15 conference record failed to qualify. Texas A&M–Commerce does not sponsor a baseball team.

== Tournament ==
| Round | Game | Time* | Matchup | Score | Attendance | Notes | Television |
First Round – Wednesday, May 22, 2024
| 1 | 1 | 9:00 am | No. 4 Northwestern State vs. No. 5 McNeese | 5–10 | | | ESPN+ |
| 1 | 2 | 12:35 pm | No. 1 Lamar vs. No. 8 Incarnate Word | 3–6 | | | ESPN+ |
| 1 | 3 | 4:10 pm | No. 2 Nicholls vs. No. 7 Texas A&M–Corpus Christi | 14–2^{(7)} | | | ESPN+ |
| 1 | 4 | 7:15 pm | No. 3 New Orleans vs. No. 6 Southeastern Louisiana | 2–10 | 1,487 | | ESPN+ |
Second Round – Thursday, May 23, 2024
| 2 | 5 | 9:00 am | No. 4 Northwestern State vs. No. 1 Lamar | 5–12 | | Northwestern State eliminated | ESPN+ |
| 2 | 6 | 12:10 pm | No. 7 Texas A&M–Corpus Christi vs. No. 3 New Orleans | 4–7 | | Texas A&M–Corpus Christi eliminated | ESPN+ |
| 2 | 7 | 4:00 pm | No. 5 McNeese vs. No. 8 Incarnate Word | 6–2 | | | ESPN+ |
| 2 | 8 | 7:20 pm | No. 2 Nicholls vs. No. 6 Southeastern Louisiana | 5–4^{(10)} | 1,590 | | ESPN+ |
Third Round – Friday, May 24, 2024
| 3 | 9 | 9:00 am | No. 1 Lamar vs. No. 8 Incarnate Word | 18–6^{(7)} | | Incarnate Word eliminated. | ESPN+ |
| 3 | 10 | 12:04 pm | No. 3 New Orleans vs. No. 6 Southeastern Louisiana | 5–11 | | New Orleans eliminated. | ESPN+ |
| 3 | 11 | 4:04 pm | No. 5 McNeese vs. No. 1 Lamar | 9–18 | | | ESPN+ |
| 3 | 12 | 8:05 pm | No. 2 Nicholls vs. No. 6 Southeastern Louisiana | 4–3 | 2,232 | Southeastern Louisiana eliminated. Nicholls advances to championship game. | ESPN+ |
Championship – Saturday, May 25, 2024
| 4 | 13 | 1:00 pm | No. 1 Lamar vs. No. 5 McNeese | 4–14^{(7)} | | Lamar eliminated. McNeese advances to championship game. | ESPN+ |
| 4 | 14 | – | Game 12 winner vs. Game 12 loser (if necessary) | – | | Not necessary | ESPN+ |
| 4 | Championship | 6:00 pm | No. 5 McNeese vs. No. 2 Nicholls | 1–15^{7} | 1,198 | Nicholls wins tournament championship. | ESPN+ |
*Game times in CDT. #-Rankings denote tournament seeding.

== Results ==
First round
4 | Northwestern State | 5
5 | McNeese | 10
1 | Lamar | 3
8 | Incarnate Word | 6
4 | Northwestern State | 5
1 | Lamar | 12
2 | Nicholls | 14^{(7)}
7 | Texas A&M–Corpus Christi | 2
3 | New Orleans | 2
6 | Southeastern Louisiana | 10
7 | Texas A&M–Corpus Christi | 4
3 | New Orleans | 7

Second round
5 | McNeese | 6
8 | Incarnate Word | 2
8 | Incarnate Word | 6
1 | Lamar | 18^{(7)}
2 | Nicholls | 5^{(10)}
6 | Southeastern Louisiana | 4
6 | Southeastern Louisiana | 11
3 | New Orleans | 5

Semifinals
5 | McNeese | 9 | 14^{(7)}
1 | Lamar | 18 | 4
2 | Nicholls | 4
6 | Southeastern Louisiana | 3

Finals
5 | McNeese | 1
2 | Nicholls | 15^{(7)}

== See also ==
- 2024 Southland Conference softball tournament
