= 2024 Northwestern State Demons baseball team =

American college baseball season

2024 Northwestern State Demons baseball
- Conference: Southland Conference
- Record: 22–33 (11–13 Southland)
- Head coach: Chris Bertrand (1st season)
- Assistant coaches: Dyland Berlanger; Billy Henley; Dan Hlad
- Home stadium: H. Alvin Brown–C. C. Stroud Field

2024 Southland Conference baseball standings
	Conf.				Overall
Team	W		L	PCT	W		L	PCT
Lamar ‍†‍‍	17	–	7	.708	44	–	15	.746
Nicholls ‍‍‡‍^{y}	16	–	8	.667	38	–	22	.633
New Orleans ‍‍‍	14	–	10	.583	31	–	26	.544
McNeese ‍‍‍	11	–	13	.458	32	–	27	.542
Northwestern State ‍‍‍	11	–	13	.458	22	–	33	.400
Southeastern Louisiana ‍‍‍	10	–	14	.417	30	–	28	.517
Texas A&M–Corpus Christi ‍‍‍	10	–	14	.417	22	–	35	.386
Incarnate Word ‍‍‍	10	–	14	.417	26	–	31	.456
Houston Christian ‍‍‍	9	–	15	.375	18	–	31	.367
† – Conference champion ‡ – Tournament champion y – Invited to the NCAA Tournament; As of June 1, 2024; Rankings from D1Baseball

The 2024 Northwestern State Demons baseball team represented Northwestern State University during the 2024 NCAA Division I baseball season. The Demons played their home games at H. Alvin Brown–C. C. Stroud Field and were led by first–year head coach Chris Bertrand. They are members of the Southland Conference. They compiled a 22–33 overall record and finished with an 11–13 record tied for 4th place in conference play. Qualifying as the #4 seeded team in the SLC tournament, the Demons' season ended with a 0–2 in tournament play losing 5–10 to #5 seeded McNeese and 5–12 to #1 seeded Lamar.

== Previous season ==
The Demons had a regular season record of 29–27 and a conference record of 12–12 finishing in a three way tie for fifth place in conference play. They participated in the 2023 Southland Conference baseball tournament as the fifth seeded team winning a tie-breaker against New Orleans and Texas A&M–Corpus Christi. Northwestern State had a 2–2 record in the conference tournament defeating second seeded Incarnate Word and sixth seeded McNeese. They lost twice to fourth seeded New Orleans.

== Preseason ==
=== Southland Conference Coaches Poll ===
The Southland Conference Coaches Poll was released on February 8, 2024. Northwestern State was picked to finish eighth in the Southland Conference with 42 votes.

Coaches poll
Predicted finish	Team	Votes (1st place)
1	Nicholls	126 (14)
2	Lamar	106 (1)
3	New Orleans	92 (3)
4	Incarnate Word	81
5	McNeese	67
6	Texas A&M–Corpus Christi	55
7	Southeastern Louisiana	53
8	Northwestern State	42
9	Houston Christian	26

=== Preseason All-Southland team ===
Bo Willis and Chase Prestwich were named to the conference preseason second team.

==== First Team ====
- Edgar Alvarez* (NICH, SR, 1st Base)
- MaCrae Kendrick (NICH, SR, 2nd Base)
- Ethan Ruiz (LU, SR, 3rd Base)
- Parker Coddou* (NICH, SR, Shortstop)
- Miguel Useche (UNO, SR, Catcher)
- Rey Mendoza* (UIW, GR, Designated Hitter)
- Mitchell Sanford* (UNO, RJR, Outfielder)
- Samuel Benjamin* (HCU, SR, Outfielder)
- Issac Williams (UNO, SR, Outfielder)
- Jacob Mayers* (NICH, SO, Starting Pitcher)
- Brooks Caple* (LU, SR, Starting Pitcher)
- Hunter Hesseltine* (LU, JR, Starting Pitcher)
- Gavin Galy* (NICH, RJR, Relief Pitcher)
- Kanin Dodge (LU, SR, Utility)

*-2023 Southland All-Conference Selection

==== Second Team ====
- Cameron Crotte (UIW, SR, 1st Base)
- Austin Roccaforte (LU, SR, 2nd Base)
- Dylan Mach (UNO, SR, 3rd Base)
- Jake Haze* (SLU, GR, Shortstop)
- Bo Willis (NWST, SR, Catcher)
- River Orsak (LU, SR, Designated Hitter)
- Garrett Felix (NICH, SR, Outfielder)
- Cooper Hext (MCNS, SR, Outfielder)
- Christian Smith-Johnson (TAMUCC, SO, Outfielder)
- Chase Prestwich (NWST, JR, Starting Pitcher)
- Isaiah Zavala (UIW, GR, Starting Pitcher)
- Jacob Ellis (LU, SR, Starting Pitcher)
- Jackson Cleveland (LU, JR, Relief Pitcher)
- Isaiah Zavala (UIW, SR, Utility)

*-2023 Southland All-Conference Selection

== Schedule and results ==
Legend
	Northwestern State win
	Northwestern State loss
	Postponement/Cancelation/Suspensions
**Bold**	Northwestern State team member
*	Non-Conference game
†	Make-Up Game

2024 Northwestern State Demons baseball game log
Regular season (22–31)

February (2–7)
Date	Opponent	Rank	Site/stadium	Score	Win	Loss	Save	TV	Attendance	Overall record	SLC Record
Feb. 16	Southern Illinois*		H. Alvin Brown–C. C. Stroud Field • Natchitoches, LA	7– 14	Aidan Foeller (1-0)	**Prestwich, Chase (0-1)**	None	ESPN+	1,031	0–1	
Feb. 17	Southern Illinois*		H. Alvin Brown–C. C. Stroud Field • Natchitoches, LA	9–14	Mike Hansell (1-0)	**Alexis, Adam (0-1)**	Easton Dermody (1)	ESPN+	895	0–2	
Feb. 18	Southern Illinois*		H. Alvin Brown–C. C. Stroud Field • Natchitoches, LA	11–15	Cole Koonce (1-0)	**Shahrdar, John (0-1)**	Anthony Pron (1)	ESPN+	838	0–3	
Feb. 22	vs. Northern Illinois*		Alex Box Stadium, Skip Bertman Field • Baton Rouge, LA	13–6	**Anderson, Austin (1-0)**	BROUWER, Adam (0-2)	None		150	1–3	
Feb. 23	vs. Stony Brook*		Alex Box Stadium, Skip Bertman Field • Baton Rouge, LA	5–2	**Prestwich, Chase (1-1)**	T. Saunders (0-1)	**Bunch, Caleb (1)**		117	2–3	
Feb. 23	vs. Northern Illinois*		Alex Box Stadium, Skip Bertman Field • Baton Rouge, LA	4–14	BRACHBILL, Ty (1-1)	**Leonard, Bryce (0-1)**	None		104	2–4	
Feb. 24	vs. Stony Brook*		Alex Box Stadium, Skip Bertman Field • Baton Rouge, LA	1–5	N. Rizzo (1-1)	**Marionneaux, Dylan (0-1)**	None		104	2–5	
Feb. 27	Louisiana–Monroe*		H. Alvin Brown–C. C. Stroud Field • Natchitoches, LA	2–9	Corley, Brandt (1-0)	**Newton, Aidan (0-1)**	None		583	2–6	
Feb. 28	at Louisiana*		M. L. Tigue Moore Field at Russo Park • Lafayette, LA	4–14	Murphy Brooks (1-0)	**Nichol, Tyler (0-1)**	None		2,479	2–7	

March (7–12)
Date	Opponent	Rank	Site/stadium	Score	Win	Loss	Save	TV	Attendance	Overall record	SLC Record
Mar 1	Troy*		H. Alvin Brown–C. C. Stroud Field • Natchitoches, LA	5–3	**Prestwich, Chase (1-0)**	Stewart, Grayson (1-2)	**Bryan, Tyler (1)**	ESPN+	933	3–7	
Mar 2	Troy*		H. Alvin Brown–C. C. Stroud Field • Natchitoches, LA	6–3	**Flowers, Dawson (1-0)**	King, Dylan (1-1)	**Newton, Aidan (1)**	ESPN+	1,033	4–7	
Mar 3	Troy*		H. Alvin Brown–C. C. Stroud Field • Natchitoches, LA	0–7	Hartzog, Clete (3-0)	**Marionneaux, Dylan (0-2)**	None	ESPN+	735	4–8	
Mar 6	Louisiana*		H. Alvin Brown–C. C. Stroud Field • Natchitoches, LA	0–3	Brooks (2-0)	**Robinson, Kevin (0-1)**	Holzhammer (2)	ESPN+	1,021	4–9	
Mar 9	at Little Rock*		Gary Hogan Field • Little Rock, AR	3–6	WELLS, Jackson (1-1)	**Prestwich, Chase (2-2)**	CLINE, Jack (1)		215	4–10	
Mar 10	at Little Rock*		Gary Hogan Field • Little Rock, AR	3–7	KUYKENDALL, Thomas (2-0)	**Flowers, Dawson (1-1)**	None		189	4–11	
Mar 10	at Little Rock*		Gary Hogan Field • Little Rock, AR	2–4	BREWER, Hoss (1-2)	**Marionneaux, Dylan (0-3)**	WEATHERLEY, Jacob (3)		195	4–12	
Mar 12	Louisiana Tech*		H. Alvin Brown–C. C. Stroud Field • Natchitoches, LA	11–5	**Anderson, Austin (2-0)**	Smith, Reed (0-2)	None	ESPN+	933	5–12	
Mar 15	at Louisiana Tech*		J. C. Love Field at Pat Patterson Park • Ruston, LA	9–11	Hubka, Grant (1-0)	**Alexis, Adam (0-2)**	Bates, Ethan (4)	ESPN+	1,813	5–13	
Mar 16	at Louisiana Tech*		J. C. Love Field at Pat Patterson Park • Ruston, LA	5–7	Nation, Connor (1-0)	**Newton, Aidan (0-2)**	Bates, Ethan (5)	ESPN+	2,046	5–14	
Mar 17	at Louisiana Tech*		J. C. Love Field at Pat Patterson Park • Ruston, LA	5–15 (8 inn)	Swistak, Turner (3-0)	**Marionneaux, Dylan (0-4)**	None	ESPN+	1,906	5–15	
Mar 20	at Sam Houston*		Don Sanders Stadium • Huntsville, TX	2–5	Chandler David (2-3)	**Bryce Leonard (0-2)**	Wyatt Tucker (3)			5–16	
Mar 22	Southeastern Louisiana		H. Alvin Brown–C. C. Stroud Field • Natchitoches, LA	0–5	Stuprich, Brennan (2-2)	**Prestwich, Chase (2-3)**	None	ESPN+	923	5–17	0–1
Mar 23	Southeastern Louisiana		H. Alvin Brown–C. C. Stroud Field • Natchitoches, LA	5–8	Lauve, Lance (1-0)	**Bryan, Tyler (0-1)**	Polk, Lakin (3)	ESPN+	843	5–18	0–2
Mar 24	Southeastern Louisiana		H. Alvin Brown–C. C. Stroud Field • Natchitoches, LA	11–8	**Marionneaux, Dylan (1-4)**	Kinzeler, Will (1-1)	**Anderson, Austin (1)**	ES collapsedPN+	783	6–18	1–2
Mar 26	Louisiana Christian*		H. Alvin Brown–C. C. Stroud Field • Natchitoches, LA	5–4	**Leonard, Bryce (1-2)**	Coleman Haltom (0-0)	**Bryan, Tyler (2)**	ESPN+	654	7–18	
Mar 28	at McNeese		Joe Miller Ballpark • Lake Charles, LA	2–8	Cameron LeJeune (3-2)	**Newton, Aidan (0-3)**	Kainin Morrow (2)	None		7–19	1–3
Mar 29	at McNeese		Joe Miller Ballpark • Lake Charles, LA	6–2	**Bunch, Caleb (1-0)**	Daelan Caraway (1-1)	None		1,011	8–19	2–3
Mar 30	at McNeese		Joe Miller Ballpark • Lake Charles, LA	10–4	**Marionneaux, Dylan (2-4)**	Ty Abraham (1-2)	None		1,059	9–19	3–3

April (9–7)
Date	Opponent	Rank	Site/stadium	Score	Win	Loss	Save	TV	Attendance	Overall record	SLC Record
Apr 2	at Grambling*		Wilbert Ellis Field at Ralph Waldo Emerson Jones Park • Grambling, LA	4–1	**Robinson, Kevin (1-1)**	Carlos Peguero (1-6)	**Bryan, Tyler (3)**		75	10–19	
Apr 3	Louisiana–Monroe*		H. Alvin Brown–C. C. Stroud Field • Natchitoches, LA	6–10	Corley, Brandt (2-1)	**Anderson, Austin (2-1)**	None	ESPN+	435	10–20	
Apr 5	Texas A&M–Corpus Christi		H. Alvin Brown–C. C. Stroud Field • Natchitoches, LA	11–4	**Prestwich, Chase (3-3)**	Dove, Kendall (1-3)	**Bunch, Caleb (2)**	ESPN+	436	11–20	4–3
Apr 6	Texas A&M–Corpus Christi		H. Alvin Brown–C. C. Stroud Field • Natchitoches, LA	4–5	Hunsaker, Riley (4-2)	**Flowers, Dawson (1-2)**	Thornton, Maddox (5)	ESPN+	656	11–21	4–4
Apr 7	Texas A&M–Corpus Christi		H. Alvin Brown–C. C. Stroud Field • Natchitoches, LA	2–7	Garcia, Zach (3-0)	Marionneaux, Dylan (2-5)	None	ESPN+	673	11–22	4–5
Apr 9	at Louisiana–Monroe*		Lou St. Amant Field • Monroe, LA	–	(-)	**Postponed – Weather**	()			–	
Apr 12	at Nicholls		Ben Meyer Diamond at Ray E. Didier Field • Thibodaux, LA	7–5	**Bunch, Caleb (2-0)**	Galy, G. (1-1)	None	ESPN+	731	12–22	5–5
Apr 13	at Nicholls		Ben Meyer Diamond at Ray E. Didier Field • Thibodaux, LA	11–10	**Newton, Aidan (1-3)**	Desandro, D. (3-3)	**Bryan, Tyler (4)**	ESPN+	804	13–22	6–5
Apr 14	at Nicholls		Ben Meyer Diamond at Ray E. Didier Field • Thibodaux, LA	5–13	Quevedo, Michael (5-0)	**Marionneaux, Dylan (2-6)**	None		800	13–23	6–6
Apr 16	LSU–Alexandria*		H. Alvin Brown–C. C. Stroud Field • Natchitoches, LA	14–0 (7 inn)	**Robinson, Kevin (2-1)**	Dominic Thibodeaux (0-0)	None	ESPN+	633	14–23	
Apr 19	at Incarnate Word		Sullivan Field • San Antonio, TX	3–6	Davis, D (1-0)	**Prestwich, Chase (3-4)**	Byrd, A (2)	ESPN+	75	14–24	6–7
Apr 20	at Incarnate Word		Sullivan Field • San Antonio, TX	6–10	Zavala, Isaiah (4-3)	**Marquez, Alejandro (0-1)**	None	ESPN+	84	14–25	6–8
Apr 21	at Incarnate Word		Sullivan Field • San Antonio, TX	0–5	Hargett, H (2-0)	**Flowers, Dawson (1-3)**	Johnson, D (1)	ESPN+	94	14–26	6–9
Apr 23	Grambling*		H. Alvin Brown–C. C. Stroud Field • Natchitoches, LA	16–8	**Robinson, Kevin (3-1)**	C. Jackson (1-1)	None	ESPN+	545	15–26	
Apr 26	Houston Christian		H. Alvin Brown–C. C. Stroud Field • Natchitoches, LA	11–5	**Prestwich, Chase (4-4)**	Edwards, Parker (4-5)	**Marquez, Alejandro (1)**	ESPN+	672	16–26	7–9
Apr 27	Houston Christian		H. Alvin Brown–C. C. Stroud Field • Natchitoches, LA	5–2	**Bryan, Tyler (1-1)**	Gunter, Rye (2-1)	None	ESPN+	737	17–26	8–9
Apr 28	Houston Christian		H. Alvin Brown–C. C. Stroud Field • Natchitoches, LA	14–4 (7 inn)	**Flowers, Dawson (2-3)**	Hamilton, Jackson (1-2)	None	ESPN+	762	18–26	9–9

May (4–5)
Date	Opponent	Rank	Site/stadium	Score	Win	Loss	Save	TV	Attendance	Overall record collapsed	SLC Record
May 3	at Lamar		Vincent–Beck Stadium • Beaumont, TX	4–8	**Caple, Brooks (6-3)**	Prestwich, Chase (4-5)	None	ESPN+	1,493	18–27	9–10
May 4	at Lamar		Vincent–Beck Stadium • Beaumont, TX	2–0	**Newton, Aidan (2-3)**	Ellis, Jacob (7-1)	**Bunch, Caleb (3)**	ESPN+	2,162	19–27	10–10
May 5	at Lamar		Vincent–Beck Stadium • Beaumont, TX	1–7	Hesseltine, Hunter (6-1)	**Flowers, Dawson (2-4)**	Cleveland, Jackson (4)	ESPN+	1,623	19–28	10–11
May 7	at LSU*		Alex Box Stadium, Skip Bertman Fieldk • Baton Rouge, LA	5–6	Gavin Guidry (2-0)	**Bunch, Caleb (2-1)**	None	SECN+	10,107	19–29	
May 10	New Orleans		H. Alvin Brown–C. C. Stroud Field • Natchitoches, LA	15–18	Mercer, Colton (6-4)	**Prestwich, Chase (4-6)**	None	ESPN+	336	19–30	10–12
May 11	New Orleans		H. Alvin Brown–C. C. Stroud Field • Natchitoches, LA	6–14	Edwards, Grant (5-4)	**Bryan, Tyler (1-2)**	None	ESPN+	412	19–31	10–13
May 13	New Orleans		H. Alvin Brown–C. C. Stroud Field • Natchitoches, LA	13–2 (7 inn)	**Flowers, Dawson (3-4)**	Dennis, Cortez (1-3)	None	ESPN+	433	20–31	11–13
May 16	Stephen F. Austin*		H. Alvin Brown–C. C. Stroud Field • Natchitoches, LA			**Cancelled**					
May 17	Stephen F. Austin*		H. Alvin Brown–C. C. Stroud Field • Natchitoches, LA	14–11	**Flowers, Dawson (4-4)**	Dylan Mulcahy (1-2)	**Bunch, Caleb (4)**	ESPN+	783	21–31	
May 18	Stephen F. Austin*		H. Alvin Brown–C. C. Stroud Field • Natchitoches, LA	12–2 (7 inn)	**Leonard, Bryce (2-2)**	Caleb Rutledge (1-4)	None	ESPN+	837	22–31	

Postseason (0–2)

Southland Tournament (0–2)
Date	Opponent	(Seed)/Rank	Site/stadium	Score	Win	Loss	Save	TV	Attendance	Overall record	Tournament record
May 22	vs. (5) McNeese	(4)	Pat Kenelly Diamond at Alumni Field • Hammond, LA	5–10	Zach Voss(2-5)	**Bryan, Tyler(1-3)**	None	ESPN+		22–32	0–1
May 23	vs. (1) Lamar	(4)	Pat Kenelly Diamond at Alumni Field • Hammond, LA	5–12	Ellis, Jacob(8-1)	**Flowers, Dawson(4-5)**	None	ESPN+		22–33	0–2

Legend: = Win = Loss = Canceled
Bold = Northwestern State team member
Rankings are based on the team's current ranking in the D1Baseball poll.

Schedule source:

== See also ==
2024 Northwestern State Lady Demons softball team
