= 2024 Nicholls Colonels baseball team =

American college baseball season

2024 Nicholls Colonels baseball

Southland Conference tournament

Corvallis Regional, 0–2
- Conference: Southland Conference
- Record: 38–22 (16–8 Southland)
- Head coach: Mike Silva (3rd season)
- Assistant coaches: Cody Livingston; Gabe Woods; Auston Colon - Student Asst
- Home stadium: Ben Meyer Diamond at Ray E. Didier Field

2024 Southland Conference baseball standings
	Conf.				Overall
Team	W		L	PCT	W		L	PCT
Lamar ‍†‍‍	17	–	7	.708	44	–	15	.746
Nicholls ‍‍‡‍^{y}	16	–	8	.667	38	–	22	.633
New Orleans ‍‍‍	14	–	10	.583	31	–	26	.544
McNeese ‍‍‍	11	–	13	.458	32	–	27	.542
Northwestern State ‍‍‍	11	–	13	.458	22	–	33	.400
Southeastern Louisiana ‍‍‍	10	–	14	.417	30	–	28	.517
Texas A&M–Corpus Christi ‍‍‍	10	–	14	.417	22	–	35	.386
Incarnate Word ‍‍‍	10	–	14	.417	26	–	31	.456
Houston Christian ‍‍‍	9	–	15	.375	18	–	31	.367
† – Conference champion ‡ – Tournament champion y – Invited to the NCAA Tournament; As of June 1, 2024; Rankings from D1Baseball

The 2024 Nicholls Colonels baseball team represented Nicholls State University during the 2024 NCAA Division I baseball season. The Colonels played their home games at Ben Meyer Diamond at Ray E. Didier Field and were led by third–year head coach Mike Silva. They are members of the Southland Conference. The Colonels compiled a 38–22 overall record and a 16–8 record in conference play for a second-place finish. Qualifying for the SLC tournament as the 2nd seeded team, the Colonels defeated 7th seed Texas A&M–Corpus Christi 14–2^{7}; 6th seeded Southeastern Louisiana 5–4^{10} and 4–3; and McNeese 15–1^{7} to win the tournament championship and earn the conference auto–bid to the 2024 NCAA Division I baseball tournament. As the 3rd seeded team in the Corvallis Regional, the Colonels fell to 2nd seeded UC Irvine 12–13 and Tulane 0–3.

== Previous season ==
The Colonels had an overall season record of 34–24 and a conference record of 15–9 winning the Southland Conference regular season championship. They participated in the 2023 Southland Conference baseball tournament as the first seeded team. The Colonels won the tournament championship with a 4–0 record defeating McNeese 3–2, Lamar 4–0, New Orleans 5–3 and New Orleans 6–3. Winning the Southland Conference autobid, the Colonels played in the 2023 NCAA Division I baseball tournament Tuscaloosa Regional. They lost to 16th ranked Alabama 3–4 in the first game. The Colonels' season ended with a loss to Boston College 6–14 in the second game.

== Preseason ==
=== Southland Conference Coaches Poll ===
The Southland Conference Coaches Poll was released on February 8, 2024. Nicholls was picked to first in the Southland Conference with 126 overall votes and 14 first place votes.

Coaches poll
Predicted finish	Team	Votes (1st place)
1	Nicholls	126 (14)
2	Lamar	106 (1)
3	New Orleans	92 (3)
4	Incarnate Word	81
5	McNeese	67
6	Texas A&M–Corpus Christi	55
7	Southeastern Louisiana	53
8	Northwestern State	42
9	Houston Christian	26

=== Preseason All-Southland team ===
Edgar Alvarez, MaCrae Kendrick, Parker Coddou, Issac Williams, and Gavin Galy were named to the conference preseason first team. Garrett Felix was named to the conference preseason second team.

==== First Team ====
- Edgar Alvarez* (NICH, SR, 1st Base)
- MaCrae Kendrick (NICH, SR, 2nd Base)
- Ethan Ruiz (LU, SR, 3rd Base)
- Parker Coddou* (NICH, SR, Shortstop)
- Miguel Useche (UNO, SR, Catcher)
- Rey Mendoza* (UIW, GR, Designated Hitter)
- Mitchell Sanford* (UNO, RJR, Outfielder)
- Samuel Benjamin* (HCU, SR, Outfielder)
- Issac Williams (UNO, SR, Outfielder)
- Jacob Mayers* (NICH, SO, Starting Pitcher)
- Brooks Caple* (LU, SR, Starting Pitcher)
- Hunter Hesseltine* (LU, JR, Starting Pitcher)
- Gavin Galy* (NICH, RJR, Relief Pitcher)
- Kanin Dodge (LU, SR, Utility)

*-2023 Southland All-Conference Selection

==== Second Team ====
- Cameron Crotte (UIW, SR, 1st Base)()
- Austin Roccaforte (LU, SR, 2nd Base)
- Dylan Mach (UNO, SR, 3rd Base)
- Jake Haze* (SLU, GR, Shortstop)
- Bo Willis (NWST, SR, Catcher)
- River Orsak (LU, SR, Designated Hitter)
- Garrett Felix (NICH, SR, Outfielder)
- Cooper Hext (MCNS, SR, Outfielder)
- Christian Smith-Johnson (TAMUCC, SO, Outfielder)
- Chase Prestwich (NWST, JR, Starting Pitcher)
- Isaiah Zavala (UIW, GR, Starting Pitcher)
- Jacob Ellis (LU, SR, Starting Pitcher)
- Jackson Cleveland (LU, JR, Relief Pitcher)
- Isaiah Zavala (UIW, SR, Utility)

*-2023 Southland All-Conference Selection ()

== Roster ==
2024 Nicholls Colonels baseball team
Players
Coaches

#	Pos.	Name	B/T	Height	Weight	Year	Home town
1	C	Kaden Amundson	R/R	5 ft 10 in (1.78 m)	180 lb (82 kg)	Fr	Otsego, Minnesota
2	INF	Drake Anderson	R/R	5 ft 9 in (1.75 m)	170 lb (77 kg)	Jr	Puyallup, Washington
3	INF	Aaron Biedeger	R/R	6 ft 31 in (2.62 m)	195 lb (88 kg)	Jr	Fort Worth, Texas
5	OF	Narvin Booker	L/R	5 ft 7 in (1.7 m)	160 lb (73 kg)	Jr	Atlanta, Georgia
6	INF	Garrett Felix	L/R	5 ft 8 in (1.73 m)	180 lb (82 kg)	Sr	Lafayette, Louisiana
7	OF	Basiel Williams	R/R	6 ft 3 in (1.91 m)	195 lb (88 kg)	RS Sr	Hammond, Louisiana
8	RHP	Haden Luke	R/R	6 ft 2 in (1.88 m)	210 lb (95 kg)	RS Jr	Vicksburg, Mississippi
10	INF	Jayden Kay	R/R	6 ft 0 in (1.83 m)	210 lb (95 kg)	Sr	Billings, Montana
11	INF	MaCrae Kendrick	S/R	5 ft 8 in (1.73 m)	180 lb (82 kg)	Sr	Humble, Texas
12	RHP	Devin Desandro	R/R	5 ft 9 in (1.75 m)	185 lb (84 kg)	Sr	Thibodaux, Louisiana
13	RHP	Jacob Mayers	R/R	6 ft 5 in (1.96 m)	205 lb (93 kg)	So	Gonzales, Louisiana
14	LHP	Michael Quevedo	L/L	5 ft 11 in (1.8 m)	195 lb (88 kg)	Jr	Deltona, Florida
15	LHP	Jack Nelson	L/L	6 ft 4 in (1.93 m)	220 lb (100 kg)	Fr	Zionsville, Indiana
16	RHP	Cole Poirrier	R/R	6 ft 3 in (1.91 m)	195 lb (88 kg)	So	Prairieville, Louisiana
17	RHP	Gavin Galy	R/R	6 ft 2 in (1.88 m)	175 lb (79 kg)	RS Jr	Orlando, Florida
18	C	Jaden Collura	L/R	5 ft 10 in (1.78 m)	192 lb (87 kg)	Jr	Hammond, Louisiana
19	RHP	Dallis Moran	R/R	6 ft 0 in (1.83 m)	165 lb (75 kg)	Fr	Gonzales, Louisiana
20	RHP	Arturo Rodriguez	R/R	5 ft 11 in (1.8 m)	203 lb (92 kg)	Sr	San Diego, California
21	INF	Cade Crosby	L/R	5 ft 11 in (1.8 m)	195 lb (88 kg)	Sr	Long Beach, Mississippi
22	LHP	Ryan Burt	L/L	6 ft 1 in (1.85 m)	210 lb (95 kg)	Sr	Columbus, Mississippi
24	RHP	Luke McGibboney	R/R	6 ft 1 in (1.85 m)	195 lb (88 kg)	Jr	St. Amant, Louisiana
25	INF	Edgar Alvarez	L/R	6 ft 4 in (1.93 m)	230 lb (104 kg)	Sr	Orlando, Florida
26	OF	Brayden Kuriger	R/R	6 ft 1 in (1.85 m)	195 lb (88 kg)	So	Gonzales, Louisiana
27	C	Kade Turnage	R/R	5 ft 1 in (1.55 m)	205 lb (93 kg)	Sr	Picayune, Mississippi
28	RHP	Harper Jordan	R/R	6 ft 3 in (1.91 m)	195 lb (88 kg)	RS Jr	Hattiesburg, Mississippi
29	INF	Parker Coddou	L/R	5 ft 10 in (1.78 m)	164 lb (74 kg)	Sr	Thibodaux, Louisiana
30	RHP	Sam Hill	R/R	6 ft 6 in (1.98 m)	210 lb (95 kg)	Sr	Soso, Mississippi
31	RHP	Nuno Parache	R/R	6 ft 1 in (1.85 m)	205 lb (93 kg)	Jr	Brooklyn, New York
32	LHP	Dylan Farley	L/L	6 ft 0 in (1.83 m)	175 lb (79 kg)	Sr	Zuid-Scharwoude, The Netherlands
33	INF	Erick Ordonez	R/R	5 ft 8 in (1.73 m)	170 lb (77 kg)	Sr	San Diego, California
34	INF	Gerardo Villareal	R/R	5 ft 10 in (1.78 m)	190 lb (86 kg)	Sr	Laredo, Texas
35	RHP	Barron Sawyer	R/R	6 ft 6 in (1.98 m)	235 lb (107 kg)	So	Lafayette, Louisiana
36	C	Lex Melancon	R/R	5 ft 6 in (1.68 m)	145 lb (66 kg)	RS Fr	Napoleonville, Louisiana
37	RHP	Nick Fields	R/R	6 ft 0 in (1.83 m)	185 lb (84 kg)	RS Jr	Galesburg, Illinois
38	RHP	Nico Saltaformaggio	R/R	6 ft 0 in (1.83 m)	198 lb (90 kg)	Sr	Destrehan, Louisiana
39	LHP	Dylan Bergeron	L/L	6 ft 0 in (1.83 m)	210 lb (95 kg)	Jr	Houma, Louisiana
41	LHP	Chase Richter	L/L	6 ft 0 in (1.83 m)	205 lb (93 kg)	Sr	Cypress, Texas
42	RHP	Michael Guerro	R/R	6 ft 5 in (1.96 m)	210 lb (95 kg)	Sr	Kissimmee, Florida
43	LHP	Alexander Llinas	L/L	5 ft 11 in (1.8 m)	215 lb (98 kg)	So	Pembroke Pines, Florida
45	RHP	Noah Melancon	R/R	6 ft 0 in (1.83 m)	185 lb (84 kg)	Fr	Lafayette, Louisiana
47	INF	Sebastian Gonzales	L/R	5 ft 8 in (1.73 m)	165 lb (75 kg)	Fr	Miami, Florida
51	RHP	Isaiah Espinoza	R/R	5 ft 11 in (1.8 m)	185 lb (84 kg)	Fr	Princeton, Florida
52	INF	Ashton Quiller	R/L	5 ft 9 in (1.75 m)	175 lb (79 kg)	Fr	Lake Charles, Louisiana
54	RHP	Kylin Broussard	R/R	6 ft 4 in (1.93 m)	175 lb (79 kg)	RS Fr	Lake Charles, Louisiana
55	OF	Juan Concepcion	R/R	6 ft 0 in (1.83 m)	175 lb (79 kg)	RS Fr	Miami, Florida

Head coach

Mike Silva (East Central)

Assistant coach(es)

Cody Livingston (Southern Mississippi)
Gabe Woods (Southeastern Louisiana)
Austin Colon (Southeastern Louisiana)

Legend

- (C) Team captain
- (S) Suspended
- (I) Ineligible
- Injured
- Current redshirt

Roster
Last update: January 9, 2024

== Schedule and results ==
Legend
	Nicholls win
	Nicholls loss
	Postponement/Cancelation/Suspensions
**Bold**	Nicholls team member
*	Non-Conference game
†	Make-Up Game

2024 Nicholls Colonels baseball game log
Regular season (34–20)

February (8–2)
Date	Opponent	Rank	Site/stadium	Score	Win	Loss	Save	TV	Attendance	Overall record	SLC Record
Feb. 16	Sacred Heart*		Ben Meyer Diamond at Ray E. Didier Field • Thibodaux, LA	16–0	**Desandro, Devin (1-0)**	Jake Babuschak (0-1)		ESPN+	502	1–0	
Feb. 17	Sacred Heart*		Ben Meyer Diamond at Ray E. Didier Field • Thibodaux, LA	5–2	**Saltaformaggio, Nico (1-0)**	Owen MacDonnell (0-1)	**Luke, Haden (1)**		311	2–0	
Feb. 18	Sacred Heart*		Ben Meyer Diamond at Ray E. Didier Field • Thibodaux, LA	19–12	**Farley, Dylan (1-0)**	Dan Rice (0-1)	None	ESPN+	611	3–0	
Feb. 20	at Tulane*		Greer Field at Turchin Stadium • New Orleans, LA	–	Henry Shuffler (1-0)	**Desandro, Devin (1-1)**	Trey Cehajic (2)	ESPN+	1,483	3–1	
Feb. 21	Dillard*		Ben Meyer Diamond at Ray E. Didier Field • Thibodaux, LA	14–2 (7 inn)	**Hill, Sam (1-0)**	Gipson, Kaleb (0-1)	None		413	4–1	
Feb. 23	Eastern Illinois*		Ben Meyer Diamond at Ray E. Didier Field • Thibodaux, LA	9–6	**Saltaformaggio, Nico (2-0)**	CAREW, Christian (0-1)	**Luke, Haden (2)**	ESPN+	611	5–1	
Feb. 24	Eastern Illinois*		Ben Meyer Diamond at Ray E. Didier Field • Thibodaux, LA	4–0	**Desandro, Devin (2-1)**	CARTWRIGHT, Eli (0-1)	None		721	6–1	
Feb. 25	Eastern Illinois*		Ben Meyer Diamond at Ray E. Didier Field • Thibodaux, LA	9–6	**Quevedo, ()Michael (1-0)**	PERRENOUD, Casey (0-2)	**Galy, Gavin (1)**	ESPN+	750	7–1	
Feb. 27	vs. Southern Miss*		MGM Park • Biloxi, MS	6–5	**Saltaformaggio, Nico (3-0)**	P2023 NCAA Division I baseball tournament participantsayne, Landen (0-1)	**Guerrero, Michael (1)**		3,013	8–1	
Feb. 28	at South Alabama*		Eddie Stanky Field • Mobile, AL	10–11 (10 inn)	Moore, Leif (1-0)	**Rodriguez, Arturo (0-1)**	None		957	8–2	

March (11–8)
Date	Opponent	Rank	Site/stadium	Score	Win	Loss	Save	TV	Attendance	Overall record	SLC Record
Mar 1	Southern*		Ben Meyer Diamond at Ray E. Didier Field • Thibodaux, LA	12–0 (7 inn)	**Mayers, Jacob (1-0)**	Ranard Grace (2-1)	None		215	9–2	
Mar 2	Southern*		Ben Meyer Diamond at Ray E. Didier Field • Thibodaux, LA	10–0 (7 inn)	**Rodriguez, Arturo (1-1)**	Antoine Harris (0-2)	None		411	10–2	
Mar 3	Southern*		Ben Meyer Diamond at Ray E. Didier Field • Thibodaux, LA	12–0 (7 inn)	**Mayers, Jacob (1-0)**	Ranard Grace (2-1)	None		215	11–2	
Mar 5	Tulane*		Ben Meyer Diamond at Ray E. Didier Field • Thibodaux, LA	12–14	Jacob Moore (1-0)	**Saltaformaggio, Nico (3-1)**	Trey Cehajic (3)		655	11–3	
Mar 6	Southeastern Baptist*		Ben Meyer Diamond at Ray E. Didier Field • Thibodaux, LA	10–0 (7 inn)	**Hill, Sam (2-0)**	Reynolds, Ryley (0-1)	**Fields, Nick (1)**		222	12–3	
Mar 6	Southeastern Baptist*		Ben Meyer Diamond at Ray E. Didier Field • Thibodaux, LA	13–1 (7 inn)	**Richter, Chase (1-0)**	Nicholson, Jonathan (0-1)	None		222	13–3	
Mar 9	Grambling*		Ben Meyer Diamond at Ray E. Didier Field • Thibodaux, LA	13–2 (8 inn)	**Mayers, Jacob (2-0)**	Randy Reyes (0-1)	None		304	14–3	
Mar 9	Grambling*		Ben Meyer Diamond at Ray E. Didier Field • Thibodaux, LA	24–12 (7 inn)	**Galy, Gavin (1-0)**	Mason Martinez (2-1)	None		304	15–3	
Mar 10	Grambling*		Ben Meyer Diamond at Ray E. Didier Field • Thibodaux, LA	5–2	**Quevedo, Michael (3-0)**	Phillip Bryant (0-2)	**Desandro, Devin (1)**		413	16–3	
Mar 12	Dillard*		Ben Meyer Diamond at Ray E. Didier Field • Thibodaux, LA	9–3	**Hill, Sam (3-0)**	Gonzalez, Handel (0-1)	None		101	17–3	
Mar 15	at Nebraska*		Haymarket Park • Lincoln, NE	6–7	Borst, Evan (2-0)	**Farley, Dylan (1-1)**	Daiss, Casey (4)		4,268	17–4	
Mar 16	at Nebraska*		Haymarket Park • Lincoln, NE	0–16	Sears, Brett (3-0)	**Nelson, Jack (0-1)**	Worthley, Jalen (1)		4,658	17–5	
Mar 17	at Nebraska*		Haymarket Park • Lincoln, NE	4–11	Brockett, Jackson (1-0)	**Desandro, Devin (2-2)**	None		4,186	17–6	
Mar 20	Louisiana Tech*		Ben Meyer Diamond at Ray E. Didier Field • Thibodaux, LA	4–6	Smith, Reed (1-2)	**Saltaformaggio, Nico (3-2)**	Bates, Ethan (6)	ESPN+	439	17–7	
Mar 22	New Orleans		Ben Meyer Diamond at Ray E. Didier Field • Thibodaux, LA	1–4	Mercer, Colton (2-3)	**Saltaformaggio, Nico (3-3)**	Blasick, Nathan (1)	ESPN+	688	17–8	0–1
Mar 23	New Orleans		Ben Meyer Diamond at Ray E. Didier Field • Thibodaux, LA	11–12	Delorbe, Ryan (2-1)	**Luke, Haden (0-1)**	Calloway, Bryce (1)		655	17–9	0–2
Mar 24	New Orleans		Ben Meyer Diamond at Ray E. Didier Field • Thibodaux, LA	5–8	Seroski, Caleb (3-1)	**Rodriguez, Arturo (1-2)**	Blasick, Nathan (2)		501	17–10	0–3
Mar 28	at Texas A&M–Corpus Christi		Chapman Field • Corpus Christi, TX	7–3	**Nelson, Jack (1-1)**	Watson, Matthew (1-4)	**Desandro, Devin (2)**	ESPN+	230	18–10	1–3
Mar 29	at Texas A&M–Corpus Christi		Chapman Field • Corpus Christi, TX	13–8	**Moran, Dallis (1-0)**	Hill, Jack (1-2)	None		233	19–10	2–3
Mar 30	at Texas A&M–Corpus Christi		Chapman Field • Corpus Christi, TX	11–4	**Guerrero, Michael (1-0)**	Feltz, Samuel (2-1)	None		252	20–10	3–3

April (7–6)
Date	Opponent	Rank	Site/stadium	Score	Win	Loss2023 NCAA Division I baseball tournament participants	Save	TV	Attendance	Overall record	SLC Record
Apr 2	at Louisiana*		M. L. Tigue Moore Field at Russo Park • Lafayette, LA	3–13 (7 inn)	Jack Martinez (3-2)	**Farley, Dylan (1-2)**	David Christie (2)	ESPN+	3,546	()|	
Apr 5	at Southeastern Louisiana		Pat Kenelly Diamond at Alumni Field • Hammond, LA	8–7 (11 inn)	**Desandro, Devin (3-2)**	Polk, Lakin (4-1)	None	ESPN+	1,420	21–11	4–3
Apr 6	at Southeastern Louisiana		Pat Kenelly Diamond at Alumni Field • Hammond, LA	7–3	**Guerrero, Michael (2-0)**	Lee, Dakota (0-3)	None	ESPN+	1,409	22–11	5–3
Apr 7	at Southeastern Louisiana		Pat Kenelly Diamond at Alumni Field • Hammond, LA	9–5	**Quevedo, Michael (4-0)**	Kinzeler, Will (1-3)	**Galy, Gavin (2)**	ESPN+	1,337	23–11	6–3
Apr 12	Northwestern State		Ben Meyer Diamond at Ray E. Didier Field • Thibodaux, LA	–	Bunch, Caleb (2-0)	**Galy, Gavin (1-1)**	None	ESPN+	731	23–12	6–4
Apr 13	Northwestern State		Ben Meyer Diamond at Ray E. Didier Field • Thibodaux, LA	10–11	Newton, Aidan (1-3)	**Desandro, Devin (3-3)**	Bryan, Tyler (4)	ESPN+	804	23–13	6–5
Apr 14	Northwestern State		Ben Meyer Diamond at Ray E. Didier Field • Thibodaux, LA	13–5	**Quevedo, Michael (5-0)**	Marionneaux, Dylan (2-6)	None	ESPN+	800	24–13	7–5
Apr 16	at Southern Miss*		Pete Taylor Park • Hattiesburg, MS	6–9	Mazza, Niko (6-2)	Saltaformaggio, Nico (3-4)	None	ESPN+	5,211	24–14	
Apr 19	at Houston Christian		Husky Field • Houston, TX	14–2 (7 inn)	**Mayers, Jacob (3-0)**	Coronel, Ethan (0-3)	None	ESPN+	337	25–14	8–5
Apr 20	at Houston Christian		Husky Field • Houston, TX	9–6	**Desandro, Devin (4-3)**	Willard, Nicholas (2-4)	**Saltaformaggio, Nico (1)**		273	26–14	9–5
Apr 21	at Houston Christian		Husky Field • Houston, TX	6–5 (12 inn)	**Farley, Dylan (2-2)**	Shoffner, Brock (0-1)	None		115	27–14	10–5
Apr 23	at LSU*		Alex Box Stadium, Skip Bertman Field • Baton Rouge, LA	0–9	Kade Anderson (4-1)	**Desandro, Devin (4-4)**	None	SECN+	10,465	27–15	
Apr 24	at Louisiana Tech*		J. C. Love Field at Pat Patterson Park • Ruston, LA	7–10	Havern, J (3-2)	**Hill, Sam (3-1)**	Bates, E (12)	ESPN+	1,742	27–16	
Apr 30	at Southern*		Lee–Hines Field • Baton Rouge, LA	12–4	**Rodriguez, Arturo (2-2)**	P. Huff (0-1)	None		211	28–16	

May (6–4)
Date	Opponent	Rank	Site/stadium	Score	Win	Loss	Save	TV	Attendance	Overall record	SLC Record
May 3	at Incarnate Word		Sullivan Field • San Antonio, TX	6–7	Salinas, Josh (5-1)	**Mayers, Jacob (3-1)**	Byrd, Adam (3)	ESPN+	97	28–17	10–6
May 4	at Incarnate Word		Sullivan Field • San Antonio, TX	7–6	**Saltaformaggio, Nico (4-4)**	Johnson, Dave (4-3)	None	ESPN+	117	29–17	11–6
May 5	at Incarnate Word		Sullivan Field • San Antonio, TX	10–7	**Desandro, Devin (5-4)**	Walls, Westin (2-5)	None	ESPN+	115	30–17	12–62023 NCAA Division I baseball tournament participants
May 7	at Houston*		Schroeder Park • Houston, TX	4–5	LaCalameto, Kyle (3-3)	**Richter, Chase (1-1)**	None	ESPN+	985	30–18	
May 10	Lamar		Ben Meyer Diamond at Ray E. Didier Field • Thibodaux, LA	5–4 (11 inn)	**Saltaformaggio, Nico (5-4)**	Havard, Peyton (2-3)	None	ESPN+	833	31–18	13–6
May 11	Lamar		Ben Meyer Diamond at Ray E. Didier Field • Thibodaux, LA	7–9 (11 inn)	Neal, Austin (3-1)	**Rodriguez, Arturo (2-3)**	None	ESPN+	667	31–19	13–7
May 12	Lamar		Ben Meyer Diamond at Ray E. Didier Field • Thibodaux, LA	3–0	**Saltaformaggio, Nico (6-4)**	Hesseltine, Hunter (6-2)	None	ESPN+	608	32–19	14–7
May 16	McNeese		Ben Meyer Diamond at Ray E. Didier Field • Thibodaux, LA	4–3	**Mayers, Jacob (4-1)**	Zach Voss (1-5)	**Saltaformaggio, Nico (2)**	ESPN+	505	33–19	15–7
May 17	McNeese		Ben Meyer Diamond at Ray E. Didier Field • Thibodaux, LA	10–3	**Desandro, Devin (6-4)**	Alexis Gravel (1-4)	None		501	34–19	16–7
May 18	McNeese		Ben Meyer Diamond at Ray E. Didier Field • Thibodaux, LA	6–10	Cameron LeJeune (W, 7-2)	**Hill, Sam (L, 3-2)**	None	ESPN+	613	34–20	16–8

Postseason (4–2)

Southland Tournament (4–0)
Date	Opponent	(Seed)/Rank	Site/stadium	Score	Win	Loss	Save	TV	Attendance	Overall record	Tournament record
May 22	vs. (7) Texas A&M–Corpus Christi	(2)	Pat Kenelly Diamond at Alumni Field • Hammond, LA	14–2 (7 inn)	**Mayers, Jacob (5-1)**	Garcia, Zach (4-3)	None	ESPN+		35–20	1–0
May 23	at (6) Southeastern Louisiana	(2)	Pat Kenelly Diamond at Alumni Field • Hammond, LA	5–4 (10 inn)	**Saltaformaggio, Nico (7-4)**	Polk, Lakin (5-4)	None	ESPN+	1,590	36–20	2–0
May 24	at (6) Southeastern Louisiana	(2)	Pat Kenelly Diamond at Alumni Field • Hammond, LA	4–3	**Rodriguez, Arturo(3-3)**	Lauve, Lance(1-1)	None	ESPN+	2,232	37–20	3–0
May 25	vs. (5) McNeese	(2)	Pat Kenelly Diamond at Alumni Field • Hammond, LA	15–1 (7 inn)	**Farley, Dylan(3-2)**	Zach Voss(2-6)	None	ESPN+	1,198	38–20	4–0

NCAA Tournament Corvallis Regional (0–2)
Date	Opponent	(Seed)/Rank	Site/stadium	Score	Win	Loss	Save	TV	Attendance	Overall record	Tournament record
May 31	vs. (2) UC Irvine	(3)	Goss Stadium at Coleman Field • Corvallis, OR	12–13	Utagawa, David (3-0)	**Desandro, Devin (6-5)**	None	ESPN+	3,893	38–21	0–1
Jun 1	(4) Tulane	(3)	Goss Stadium at Coleman Field • Corvallis, OR	0–3	Luc Fladda(5-3)	**Quevedo, Michael(5-1)**	Jacob Moore (6)	ESPN+	3,869	38–22	0–2

Legend: = Win = Loss = Canceled
Bold = Nicholls team member
Rankings are based on the team's current ranking in the D1Baseball poll.

Schedule source:

== Conference awards and honors ==
=== 2024 All-Southland Conference team ===
Edgar Alvarez was named conference Player of the Year. Nico Saltaformaggio was named conference Relief Pitcher of the Year. Edgar Alvarez and Nico Saltaformaggio were also named to the All-Southland Conference first team. Parker Coddou, Basiel Williams, and Drake Anderson were named as second team members. Edgar Alvarez was also named to the All-conference Defensive team.

==== First Team ====
- Miguel Useche (UNO, SR, Catcher)
- Edgar Alvarez (NICH, SR, 1st Base)
- Isaac Webb (TAMUCC, RJR, 2nd Base)
- TJ Salvaggio (SLU, JR, Shortstop)
- Shea Thomas (SLU, SR, 3rd Base)
- Mitchell Sanford (UNO, RJR, Outfielder)
- Samuel Benjamin (HCU, SR, Outfielder)
- Cooper Hext (MCN, SR, Outfielder)
- Dalton Beck (UIW, JR, Designated Hitter)
- Bryce Calloway (UNO, JR, Utility)
- Brooks Caple (LU, SR, Starting Pitcher)
- Colton Mercer (UNO, JR, Starting Pitcher)
- Brennan Stuprich (SLU, RJR, Starting Pitcher)
- Nico Saltaformaggio (NICH, SR, Relief Pitcher)

==== Second Team ====
- Zak Skinner (LU, JR, Catcher)
- Brayden Evans (LU, JR, 1st Base)
- Diego Villescas (UNO, JR, 2nd Base)
- Parker Coddou (NICH, JR, Shortstop)
- Sebastian Trinidad (TAMUCC, SR, 3rd Base)
- Reese Lipoma (NWST, JR, Outfielder)
- Basiel Williams (NICH, RSR, Outfielder)
- Cameron Caley (UIW, SR, Outfielder)
- River Orsak (LU, SR, Designaterd Hitter)
- Drake Anderson (NICH, JR, Utility)
- Matthew Watson (TAMUCC, RJR, Starting Pitcher)
- Jacob Ellis (LU, SR, Starting Pitcher)
- Hunter Hesseltine (LU, JR, Starting Pitcher)
- Caleb Bunch (NWST, JR, Relief Pitcher)

==== 2024 All-Southland Defensive team ====
- Miguel Useche (UNO, JR, Catcher)
- Edgar Alvarez (NICH, SR, 1st Base)
- Dalton Hurst (UNO, JR, 2nd Base)
- Kanin Dodge (LU, SR, Shortstop)
- Rocco Gump (NWST, JR, 3rd Base)
- Cooper Hext (MCN, SR, Left Fielder)
- Conner Westenburg (MCN, JR, Center Fielder)
- Mitchell Sanford (UNO, SR, Right Fielder)
- Cameron LeJeune (MCN, RJR, Pitcher)

=== Weekly awards ===
Weekly honors
Honors	Player	Position	Date Awarded	Ref.
SLC Hitter of the Week	Edgar Alvarez	1B	February 19, 2024	
SLC Hitter of the Week	Garrett Felix	INF	April 8, 2024	
SLC Pitcher of the Week	Nico Saltaformaggio	LHP	May 6, 2024	
SLC Pitcher of the Week	Nico Saltaformaggio	LHP	May 14, 2024	

== See also ==
2024 Nicholls Colonels softball team
