= 2024 Texas A&M–Corpus Christi Islanders baseball team =

American college baseball season

2024 Texas A&M–Corpus Christi Islanders baseball
- Conference: Southland Conference
- Record: 22–35 (10–14 Southland)
- Head coach: Scott Malone (17th season)
- Assistant coaches: Matt Parker; Scott Kelly; Noe Ruiz, Jr.
- Home stadium: Chapman Field

2024 Southland Conference baseball standings
	Conf.				Overall
Team	W		L	PCT	W		L	PCT
Lamar ‍†‍‍	17	–	7	.708	44	–	15	.746
Nicholls ‍‍‡‍^{y}	16	–	8	.667	38	–	22	.633
New Orleans ‍‍‍	14	–	10	.583	31	–	26	.544
McNeese ‍‍‍	11	–	13	.458	32	–	27	.542
Northwestern State ‍‍‍	11	–	13	.458	22	–	33	.400
Southeastern Louisiana ‍‍‍	10	–	14	.417	30	–	28	.517
Texas A&M–Corpus Christi ‍‍‍	10	–	14	.417	22	–	35	.386
Incarnate Word ‍‍‍	10	–	14	.417	26	–	31	.456
Houston Christian ‍‍‍	9	–	15	.375	18	–	31	.367
† – Conference champion ‡ – Tournament champion y – Invited to the NCAA Tournament; As of June 1, 2024; Rankings from D1Baseball

The 2024 Texas A&M–Corpus Christi Islanders baseball team represented Texas A&M University–Corpus Christi during the 2024 NCAA Division I baseball season. The Islanders played their home games at Chapman Field. They were led by seventeenth–year head coach Scott Malone as members of the Southland Conference. They compiled a 22–35 overall record and a 10–14 record in conference play in three–way tie for sixth place. The Islanders qualified for the SLC tournament as the 7th seeded team. Their season ended with a 0–2 record in conference tournament play losing to Nicholls 2–14^{7} and New Orleans 4–7.

== Previous season ==
The Islanders had a regular season record of 24–30 and a conference record of 12–12 finishing in a three way tie for fifth place in SLC play. They qualified as the seventh seeded team in the 2023 Southland Conference baseball tournament. Their season ended losing a sudden–death tournament opening game against sixth seeded McNeese.

== Preseason ==
=== Southland Conference Coaches Poll ===
The Southland Conference Coaches Poll was released on February 8, 2024. Texas A&M–Corpus Christi was picked to finish eighth in the Southland Conference with 55 votes.

Coaches poll
Predicted finish	Team	Votes (1st place)
1	Nicholls	126 (14)
2	Lamar	106 (1)
3	New Orleans	92 (3)
4	Incarnate Word	81
5	McNeese	67
6	Texas A&M–Corpus Christi	55
7	Southeastern Louisiana	53
8	Northwestern State	42
9	Houston Christian	26

=== Preseason All-Southland team ===
Christian Smith-Johnson was named to the conference preseason second team.

==== First Team ====
- Edgar Alvarez* (NICH, SR, 1st Base)
- MaCrae Kendrick (NICH, SR, 2nd Base)
- Ethan Ruiz (LU, SR, 3rd Base)
- Parker Coddou* (NICH, SR, Shortstop)
- Miguel Useche (UNO, SR, Catcher)
- Rey Mendoza* (UIW, GR, Designated Hitter)
- Mitchell Sanford* (UNO, RJR, Outfielder)
- Samuel Benjamin* (HCU, SR, Outfielder)
- Issac Williams (UNO, SR, Outfielder)
- Jacob Mayers* (NICH, SO, Starting Pitcher)
- Brooks Caple* (LU, SR, Starting Pitcher)
- Hunter Hesseltine* (LU, JR, Starting Pitcher)
- Gavin Galy* (NICH, RJR, Relief Pitcher)
- Kanin Dodge (LU, SR, Utility)

*-2023 Southland All-Conference Selection

==== Second Team ====
- Cameron Crotte (UIW, SR, 1st Base)
- Austin Roccaforte (LU, SR, 2nd Base)
- Dylan Mach (UNO, SR, 3rd Base)
- Jake Haze* (SLU, GR, Shortstop)
- Bo Willis (NWST, SR, Catcher)
- River Orsak (LU, SR, Designated Hitter)
- Garrett Felix (NICH, SR, Outfielder)
- Cooper Hext (MCNS, SR, Outfielder)
- Christian Smith-Johnson (TAMUCC, SO, Outfielder)
- Chase Prestwich (NWST, JR, Starting Pitcher)
- Isaiah Zavala (UIW, GR, Starting Pitcher)
- Jacob Ellis (LU, SR, Starting Pitcher)
- Jackson Cleveland (LU, JR, Relief Pitcher)
- Isaiah Zavala (UIW, SR, Utility)

*-2023 Southland All-Conference Selection

== Schedule and results ==
Legend
	Texas A&M–Corpus Christi win
	Texas A&M–Corpus Christi loss
	Postponement/Cancelation/Suspensions
**Bold**	Texas A&M–Corpus Christi team member
*	Non-Conference game
†	Make-Up Game

2024 Texas A&M–Corpus Christi Islanders baseball game log
Regular season (22–33)

February (4–7)
Date	Opponent	Rank	Site/stadium	Score	Win	Loss	Save	TV	Attendance	Overall record	SLC Record
SFA Tournament
Feb 16	vs. Central Michigan*		Pilgram's Park • Nacogdoches, TX	3–1 (11 inn)	**Feltz, Samuel (1-0)**	E. Waters (0-1)	None			1–0	
Feb 17	vs. Central Michigan*		Pilgram's Park • Nacogdoches, TX	13–1 (7 inn)	**Hunsaker, Riely (1-0)**	B. Vitas (0-1)	None			2–0	
Feb 17	at Stephen F. Austin*		Pilgram's Park • Nacogdoches, TX	10–17	Cade Stapleton (1-0)	**Dean, Austin (0-1)**	None			2–1	
Feb 18	at Stephen F. Austin*		Pilgram's Park • Nacogdoches, TX	5–13	E. Balmaceda (1-0)	**Soliz, Cam (0-1)**	W. Larson (1)			2–2	
Feb 20	Kansas*		Whataburger Field • Corpus Christi, TX	7–13	Cranton, Hunter (1-0)	**Dean, Austin (0-1)**	None	FloBaseball	376	2–3	
Feb 21	Texas Southern*		Chapman Field • Corpus Christi, TX	8–4	**Hendricks, Evans (1-0)**	Dalton Alford (0-2)	None		252	3–3	
Kleberg Bank College Classic
Feb 23	Maryland*		Whataburger Field • Corpus Christi, TX	5–7	Haberthier, Nate (1-0)	**Dean, Austin (0-3)**	Sarcone, Trystan (1)	FloBaseball	1,114	3–4	
Feb 24	Washington*		Whataburger Field • Corpus Christi, TX	4–11	Boyle, Sam (1-1)	**Hunsaker, Riely (1-1)**	None	FloBaseball	952	3–5	
Feb 25	Pittsburgh*		Whataburger Field • Corpus Christi, TX	2–10	Jack Sokol (1-0)	**Thornton, Maddox (0-1)**	Ethan Firoved (1)	FloBaseball	725	3–6	
Feb 26	Pittsburgh*		Chapman Field • Corpus Christi, TX	2–10	Jack Sokol (1-0	**Thornton, Maddox (0-1)**	Ethan Firoved (1)		725	3–7	
South Texas Showdown
Feb 28	at UT Rio Grande Valley*		UTRGV Baseball Stadium • Edinburg, TX	2–1	**Hendricks, Evans (2-0)**	Hernandez, Francisco (1-1)	**Thornton, Maddox (1)**	ESPN+	1,618	4–7	

March (9–12)
Date	Opponent	Rank	Site/stadium	Score	Win	Loss	Save	TV	Attendance	Overall record	SLC Record
Mar 1	Abilene Christian*		Chapman Field • Corpus Christi, TX	2–7	Glaze, Austin (2-0)	**Watson, Matthew (0-1)**	None	ESPN+	325	4–8	
Mar 2	Abilene Christian*		Whataburger Field • Corpus Christi, TX	6–1	**Hunsaker, Riely (2-1)**	Campa, Iain (2-1)	**Thornton, Maddox (2)**		423	5–8	
Mar 3	Abilene Christian*		Chapman Field • Corpus Christi, TX	5–2	**Garcia, Zach (1-0)**	De La Cruz, Rolando (0-1)	**Hendricks, Evans (1)**	ESPN+	212	6–8	
Mar 5	at Texas State*		Bobcat Baseball Stadium • San Marcos, TX	6–5	**Stuart, David (1-0)**	Stroud, Jack (1-2)	**Thornton, Maddox (3)**		1,942	7–8	
Mar 8	UTSA*		Chapman Field • Corpus Christi, TX	4–2	**Watson, Matthew (1-1)**	Robert Orloski (1-2)	**Hendricks, Evans (2)**	ESPN+	243	8–8	
Mar 9	UTSA*		Chapman Field • Corpus Christi, TX	4–5	Ruger Riojas (4-0)	**Thornton, Maddox (0-2)**	Fischer Kingsbery (1)	ESPN+	267	8–9	
Mar 10	UTSA*		Chapman Field • Corpus Christi, TX	6–4	**Dove, Kendall (1-0)**	Daniel Garza (0-1)	None	ESPN+	280	9–9	
South Texas Showdown
Mar 12	UT Rio Grande Valley*		Chapman Field • Corpus Christi, TX	2–5	Tejada, Anthony (1-0)	**Dove, Kendall (1-1)**	Hernandez, Francisco (2)	ESPN+	267	9–10	
Mar 13	University of Houston–Victoria*		Chapman Field • Corpus Christi, TX	14–1	**Hill, Jack (1-0)**	Parker, Brady (4-2)	None	ESPN+	150	10–10	
Mar 15	at Dallas Baptist*		Horner Ballpark • Dallas, TX	5–10	JOHNSON, Ryan (3-0)	**Watson, Matthew (1-2)**	None		885	10–11	
Mar 16	at Dallas Baptist*		Horner Ballpark • Dallas, TX	1–11 (8 inn)	DeBERRY, JARON (2-0)	**Hunsaker, Riely (2-2)**	None		630	10–12	
Mar 17	at Dallas Baptist*		Horner Ballpark • Dallas, TX	4–5	WILSON, Nick (3-1)	**Thornton, Maddox (0-3)**	None		790	10–13	
Mar 19	Northwestern*		Chapman Field • Corpus Christi, TX	5–16 (7 inn)	MCCLURE, MATT (1-2)	**Dove, Kendall (1-2)**	None	ESPN+	259	10–14	
Mar 20	Northwestern*		Chapman Field • Corpus Christi, TX	6–7 (7 inn)	DYKE, JACK (1-0)	**Stuart, David (1-1)**	None	ESPN+	210	10–15	
Mar 22	at Incarnate Word		Sullivan Field • San Antonio, TX	7–12 (7 inn)	Salinas, Josh (2-0)	**Watson, Matthew (1-3)**	None	ESPN+	103	10–16	0–1
Mar 23	at Incarnate Word		Sullivan Field • San Antonio, TX	11–5	**Hunsaker, Riely (3-2)**	Zavala, Isaiah (2-2)	Hill, Jack (1)	ESPN+	144	11–16	1–1
Mar 24	at Incarnate Word		Sullivan Field • San Antonio, TX	14–12	**Garcia, Zach (2-0)**	Walls, Westin (2-2)	None	ESPN+	152	12–16	2–1
Mar 26	at Texas*		UFCU Disch–Falk Field • Austin, TX	4–1	**Feltz, Samuel (2-0)**	Selvig, Cole (0-2)	**Thornton, Maddox (4)**	ESPN+	7,128	13–16	
Mar 28	Nicholls		Chapman Field • Corpus Christi, TX	3–7	Nelson, Jack (1-1)	**Watson, Matthew (1-4)**	Desandro, Devin (2)	ESPN+	230	13–17	2–2
Mar 29	Nicholls		Chapman Field • Corpus Christi, TX	8–13	Moran, Dallis (1-0)	**Hill, Jack (1-2)**	None		233	13–18	2–3
Mar 30	Nicholls		Chapman Field • Corpus Christi, TX	4–11	Guerrero, Michael (1-0)	**Feltz, Samuel (2-1)**	None		252	13–19	2–4

April (8–8)
Date	Opponent	Rank	Site/stadium	Score	Win	Loss	Save	TV	Attendance	Overall record	SLC Record
Apr 2	Prairie View*		Chapman Field • Corpus Christi, TX	10–3	**Soliz, Cam (1-0)**	Allen, Preston (0-3)	None	ESPN+	222	14–19	
Apr 5	at Northwestern State		H. Alvin Brown–C. C. Stroud Field • Natchitoches, LA	4–11	Prestwich, Chase (3-3)	**Dove, Kendall (1-3)**	Bunch, Caleb (2)	ESPN+	436	14–20	2–5
Apr 6	at Northwestern State		H. Alvin Brown–C. C. Stroud Field • Natchitoches, LA	5–4	**Hunsaker, Riely (4-2)**	Flowers, Dawson (1-2)	**Thornton, Maddox (5)**	ESPN+	656	15–20	3–5
Apr 7	at Northwestern State		H. Alvin Brown–C. C. Stroud Field • Natchitoches, LA	7–2	**Garcia, Zach (3-0)**	Marionneaux, Dylan (2-5)	None	ESPN+	673	16–20	4–5
Apr 10	at Rice*		Reckling Park • Houston, TX	3–5	Mark Perkins (1-0)	**Feltz, Samuel (2-2)**	Reed Gallant (1)		1,908	16–21	
Apr 12	Houston Christian		Chapman Field • Corpus Christi, TX	2–6	Hamilton, Jackson (1-1)	**Hill, Jack (1-3)**	None	ESPN+	350	16–22	4–6
Apr 13	Houston Christian		Chapman Field • Corpus Christi, TX	1–17	Edwards, Parker (4-4)	**Hunsaker, Riely (4-3)**	None	ESPN+	150	16–23	4–7
Apr 14	Houston Chrisian		Chapman Field • Corpus Christi, TX	13–12	**Thornton, Maddox (1-3)**	Feltman, Jett (2-3)	**Hill, Jack (2)**	ESPN+	252	17–23	5–7
Apr 16	at UTSA*		Roadrunner Field • San Antonio, TX	2–4	Beaird, Ryan (1-0)	**Flaugher, Joshua (0-2)**	Riojas, Ruger (6)	ESPN+	652	17–24	
Apr 19	Lamar		Chapman Field • Corpus Christi, TX	6–3	**Soliz, Cam (2-0)**	Neal, Austin (2-1)	None	ESPN+	350	18–24	6–7
Apr 20	Lamar		Chapman Field • Corpus Christi, TX	3–6	Ellis, Jacob (7-0)	**Hunsaker, Riely (4-4)**	Perez, Andres (5)	ESPN+	250	18–25	6–8
Apr 21	Lamar		Chapman Field • Corpus Christi, TX	7–3	**Garcia, Zach (4-0)**	Hesseltine, Hunter (4-1)	None	ESPN+	382	19–25	7–8
Apr 24	at Prairie View*		John W. Tankersley Field • Prairie View, TX	8–10	Elijah Breeden (2-1)	**Soliz, Cam (1-1)**	Victor Mendoza (3)		52	19–26	
Apr 26	at New Orleans		Maestri Field at Privateer Park • New Orleans, LA	2–0	**Watson, Matthew (2-4)**	Mercer, Colton (5-4)	**Hunsaker, Riely (1)**	ESPN+	345	20–26	8–8
Apr 27	at New Orleans		Maestri Field at Privateer Park • New Orleans, LA	11–6	**Soliz, Cam (3-1)**	Edwards, Grant (4-4)	**Thornton, Maddox (6)**	ESPN+	357	21–26	9–8
Apr 28	at New Orleans		Maestri Field at Privateer Park • New Orleans, LA	3–5	Dennis, Cortez (1-2)	**Garcia, Zach (4-1)**	Tyson-Long, Kyrin (4)	ESPN+	695	21–27	9–9

May (1–6)
Date	Opponent	Rank	Site/stadium	Score	Win	Loss	Save	TV	Attendance	Overall record	SLC Record
May 3	McNeese		Chapman Field • Corpus Christi, TX	3–7	Ty Abraham (3-2)	**Dove, Kendall (1-4)**	Cameron LeJeune (5)	ESPN+	182	21–28	9–10
May 4	McNeese		Chapman Field • Corpus Christi, TX	4–9	Gravel, Alexis (1-3)	**Hill, Jack (1-4)**	None	ESPN+	235	21–29	9–11
May 5	McNeese		Chapman Field • Corpus Christi, TX	10–13	LeJeune, Cameron (6-2)	**Soliz, Cam (3-2)**	None	ESPN+	245	21–30	9–12
South Texas Showdown
Mar 14	UT Rio Grande Valley*		Chapman Field • Corpus Christi, TX	3–4	Tejada, A (3-2)	**Flaugher, Joshua (0-3)**	Lopez, J (2)	ESPN+	189	20–31	
May 16	at Southeastern Louisiana		Pat Kenelly Diamond at Alumni Field • Hammond, LA	4–12	Stuprich, Brennan (5-3)	**Dove, Kendall (1-5)**	None	ESPN+	1,076	21–32	9–13
May 16	at Southeastern Louisiana		Pat Kenelly Diamond at Alumni Field • Hammond, LA	8–9	Fabre, Larson (3-1)	**Garcia, Zach (4-2)**	Rodriguez, Jackson (7)	ESPN+	1,297	21–33	9–14
May 17	at Southeastern Louisiana		Pat Kenelly Diamond at Alumni Field • Hammond, LA	9–8	**Matthew Watson (3-4)**	Hayden Robb (3-3)	None	ESPN+	1,260	22–33	10–14

Postseason (0–2)

Southland Tournament (0–2)
Date	Opponent	(Seed)/Rank	Site/stadium	Score	Win	Loss	Save	TV	Attendance	Overall record	Tournament record
May 22	vs. (2) Nicholls	(7)	Pat Kenelly Diamond at Alumni Field • Hammond, LA	2–14 (7 inn)	Mayers, Jacob (5-1)	**Garcia, Zach (4-3)**	None	ESPN+		22–34	0–1
May 23	vs. (3) New Orleans	(7)	Pat Kenelly Diamond at Alumni Field • Hammond, LA	4–7	Olivier, Chris(2-1)	**Hunsaker, Riley(4-5)**	None	ESPN+		22–35	0–2

Legend: = Win = Loss = Canceled
Bold = Texas A&M–Corpus Christi team member
Rankings are based on the team's current ranking in the D1Baseball poll.

Schedule source:

== Conference awards and honors ==
=== Weekly awards ===
Weekly honors
Honors	Player	Position	Date Awarded	Ref.
SLC Pitcher of the Week	Riely Hunsaker	RHP	February 19, 2024	

== See also ==
2024 Texas A&M–Corpus Christi Islanders softball team
