= Ryan Shotzberger =

American baseball coach (born 1982)

Biographical details
- Born: April 12, 1982 (age 43); Wilmington, Delaware, U.S.

Playing career
- 2001–2004: McDaniel College
- Position(s): Shortstop

Coaching career (HC unless noted)
- 2005: Cecil College (assistant)
- 2006: Duke (assistant)
- 2007–2011: TCU (assistant)
- 2012–2014, 2018–2019: Houston (assistant)
- 2020–2025: Incarnate Word

Administrative career (AD unless noted)
- 2015–2017: Houston (DPD)

Head coaching record
- Overall: 122–156
- Tournaments: Southland: 3–4; NCAA: 0–0

Ryan Shotzberger (April 12, 1982) is an American college baseball coach and former shortstop. He was the head baseball coach at the University of the Incarnate Word. Shotzberger played college baseball at McDaniel College from 2001 to 2004 for coach Dave Seibert. He served as the head assistant at the University of Houston from 2012 to 2019.

== Playing career ==
Shotzberger attended Wilmington Friends School in Wilmington, Delaware. He was a member of the schools varsity baseball team. He then enrolled at McDaniel College, to play college baseball for the McDaniel Green Terror baseball team. He was named First Team All-Centennial Conference in 2003 and 2004.

== Coaching career ==
Shotzberger began his coaching career in 2005 as an assistant coach at Cecil College. He was named an assistant coach at Duke for the 2006 season. On August 22, 2006, he was named an assistant at TCU. While at TCU, Shotzberger was an assistant with Todd Whitting, who would add Shotzberger to his coaching staff at the University of Houston on August 11, 2011. Following the 2014 season, he stepped back into a Director of Player Development role. In 2018, he returned to the field as a coach.

On June 24, 2019, Shotzberger was named the 5th coach in program history for the Incarnate Word Cardinals baseball program.

== Head coaching record ==
Statistics overview
Season	Team	Overall	Conference	Standing	Postseason
Incarnate Word Cardinals (Southland Conference) (2020–2025)
2020	Incarnate Word	9–7	1–2		Season canceled due to COVID-19
2021	Incarnate Word	21–28	17–23	11th	
2022	Incarnate Word	21–31	9–15	8th	
2023	Incarnate Word	28–26	14–10	2nd	Southland Tournament
2024	Incarnate Word	26–31	10–14	8th	Southland Tournament
2025	Incarnate Word	17–33	3–27	11th	
Incarnate Word:		122–156	54–81		
Total:		122–156			
National champion Postseason invitational champion Conference regular season champion Conference regular season and conference tournament champion Division regular season champion Division regular season and conference tournament champion Conference tournament champion

== See also ==
- List of current NCAA Division I baseball coaches
