= Pat Kenelly Diamond at Alumni Field =

Baseball venue in Hammond, Louisiana

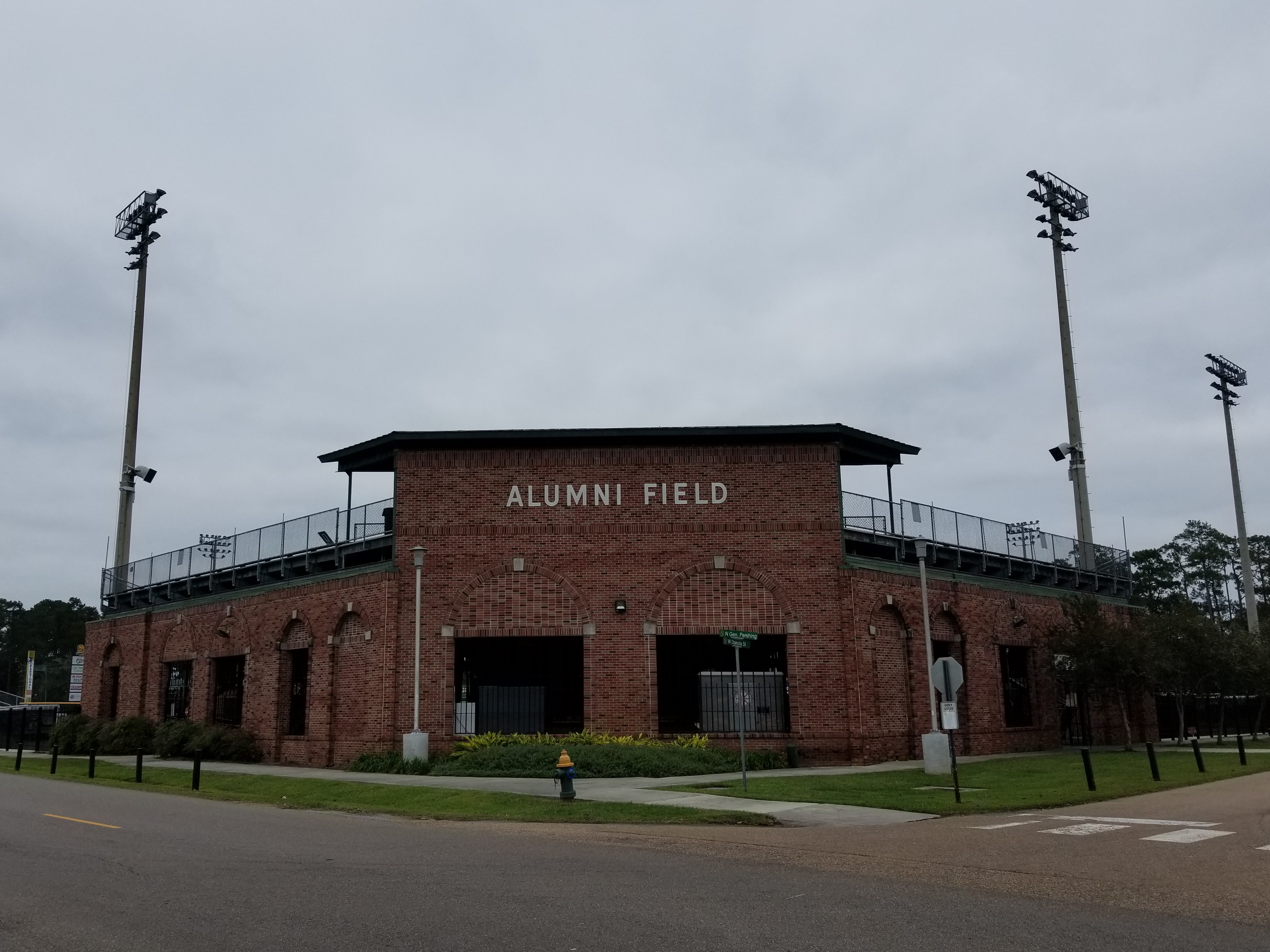
- Interactive map of Pat Kenelly Diamond at Alumni Field
- Location: North General Pershing Street and West Dakota Street, Hammond, LA, United States
- Coordinates: 30°30′33.8″N 90°28′14.8″W
- Owner: Southeastern Louisiana University
- Capacity: 2,500
- Scoreboard: Electronic

Construction
- Renovated: 2011

Tenant
- Southeastern Louisiana Lions baseball

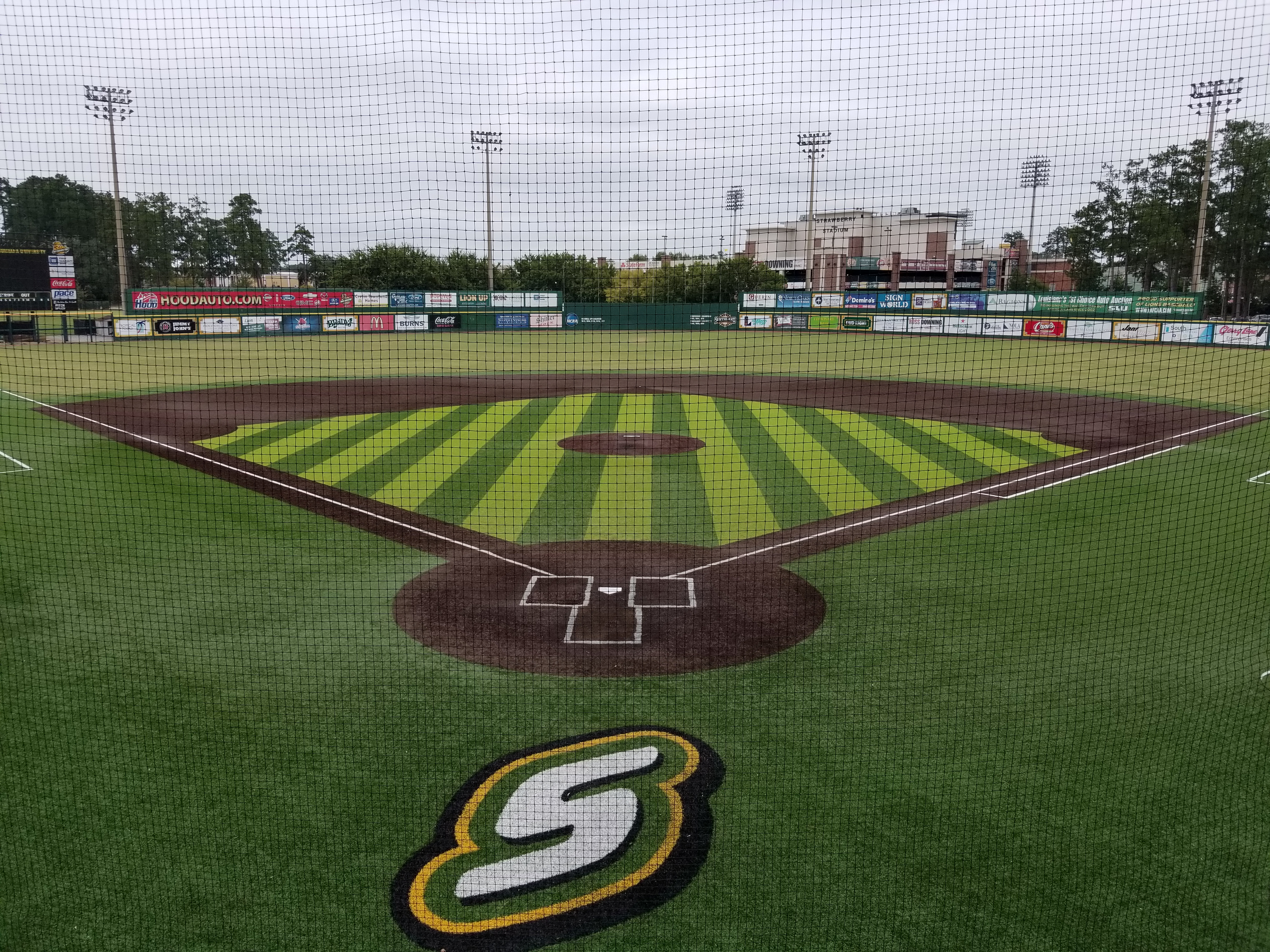
Pat Kenelly Diamond at Alumni Field

Pat Kenelly Diamond at Alumni Field is a baseball venue in Hammond, Louisiana, United States. It is home to the Southeastern Louisiana Lions baseball team of the NCAA's Division I Southland Conference. The facility has a capacity of 2,500 spectators.

It is named after Pat Kenelly, the longest tenured baseball coach in program history. Kenelly also served as athletic director and both assistant and head football coach in his time at the university, 1948–1977. The diamond was dedicated to him on February 19, 2006.

== Features ==
Stadium features include stadium lighting, dugouts, concession stands, a picnic area, a clubhouse, and a players' lounge. In 2010, windscreens and banners were added around the ballpark.

A 2011 donation from Hammond business owners John and Georgianne Poteet allowed for a new indoor hitting facility. Located past the left field fence, the cages were announced in a February 9, 2011, groundbreaking ceremony.

== See also ==
- List of NCAA Division I baseball venues
