= 2024 Texas A&M Aggies baseball team =

American college baseball season

2024 Texas A&M Aggies baseball

Bryan-College Station Regional champions Bryan-College Station Super Regional champions

College World Series, runner-up
- Conference: Southeastern Conference
- Western Division
- Record: 53–15 (19–11 SEC)
- Head coach: Jim Schlossnagle (3rd season)
- Associate head coach: Nolan Cain (3rd season)
- Assistant coaches: Michael Earley (3rd season); Max Weiner (1st season)
- Home stadium: Olsen Field at Blue Bell Park

2024 Southeastern Conference baseball standings
	Conf.				Overall
Team	W		L	PCT	W		L	PCT
Eastern
No. 1 Tennessee ^{x}‍†‍‡‍^{y}	22	–	8	.733	60	–	13	.822
No. 3 Kentucky ^{x}‍†‍‍^{y}	22	–	8	.733	46	–	16	.742
No. 11 Georgia ‍‍‍^{y}	17	–	13	.567	43	–	17	.717
Vanderbilt ‍‍‍^{y}	13	–	17	.433	38	–	23	.623
No. 8 Florida ‍‍‍^{y}	13	–	17	.433	36	–	30	.545
South Carolina ‍‍‍^{y}	13	–	17	.433	37	–	25	.597
Missouri ‍‍‍	9	–	21	.300	23	–	32	.418
Western
No. 17 Arkansas ^{x}‍‍‍^{y}	20	–	10	.667	44	–	16	.733
No. 2 Texas A&M ‍‍‍^{y}	19	–	11	.633	53	–	15	.779
No. 22 Mississippi State ‍‍‍^{y}	17	–	13	.567	40	–	23	.635
Alabama ‍‍‍^{y}	13	–	17	.433	33	–	24	.579
LSU ‍‍‍^{y}	13	–	17	.433	43	–	23	.652
Ole Miss ‍‍‍	11	–	19	.367	27	–	29	.482
Auburn ‍‍‍	8	–	22	.267	27	–	26	.509
x – Division champion † – Conference champion ‡ – Tournament champion y – Invited to the NCAA Tournament; As of June 24, 2024; Rankings from D1Baseball

The 2024 Texas A&M Aggies baseball team represented Texas A&M University in the 2024 NCAA Division I baseball season. The Aggies played their home games at Blue Bell Park.

== Previous season ==
The Aggies finished 38–27, 14–16 in the SEC to finish in 5th place in the West.

== Stadium upgrades and renovations ==
Demand for Aggie baseball season tickets has greatly outweighed availability. Texas A&M set a new post-2012 renovation attendance record of 8,075 on April 13, 2024, against the Vanderbilt Commodores and the combined attendance of 22,809 during the series against the Georgia Bulldogs was the second-largest crowd since the stadium opened in 1978. To address the high demand and record crowds, Texas A&M expanded the outfield seating known as "Section 12" by adding an additional 250 seats to left-center field. The Aggies concluded the 2024 regular season with an average home game attendance of 6,271, which ranked 7th nationally and exceeds the stated Blue Bell Park capacity.

In May 2024, the Texas A&M University System Board of Regents approved a proposal to spend $80 million to renovate Blue Bell Park and expand seating. The proposed renovation would begin between September 2025 and August 2026. Discussions from November 2022 about a proposed renovation indicated the project would include new reserved seating plus renovations to concourses, restrooms, food service areas, and current premium club areas, as well as spaces used by the team such as the locker room, hitting and pitching facilities, weight room, meeting rooms, bullpens, and coaches’ offices.

== Personnel ==
=== Roster ===
2024 Texas A&M Aggies Roster
Pitchers: 10 – Chris Cortez – Junior; 14 – Isaac Morton – Freshman; 15 – Eldridge Armstrong III – Junior; 18 – Ryan Prager – (redshirt) Sophomore; 19 – Troy Wansing – Junior; 21 – Weston Moss – Freshman; 23 – Tanner Jones – Junior; 28 – Brett Antolick – Freshman; 30 – Kaiden Wilson – Freshman; 32 – Brad Rudis – Junior; 33 – Justin Lamkin – Sophomore; 34 – Josh Stewart – Junior; 35 – Jason Bodin – Freshman; 37 – Ty Baker – Freshman; 38 – Shane Sdao – Sophomore; 41 – Jackson Brasseux – Freshman; 44 – Luke Jackson – (redshirt) Freshman; 49 – Austin Vargas – Freshman; 53 – Evan Aschenbeck – Senior; 55 – Zane Badmaev – (redshirt) Senior; 59 – Zach Frye – Freshman; 62 – Peyton Smith – Sophomore; 88 – Brock Peery – Senior	Catchers: 11 – Max Kaufer – Sophomore; 20 – Jackson Appel – Senior; 48 – Hank Bard – Senior; Infielders: 0 – Justin Vossos – (redshirt) Freshman; 1 – Jack Bell – Freshman; 2 – Ali Camarillo – Junior; 3 – Kaeden Kent – Sophomore; 27 – Ted Burton – Senior; 31 – Carl Schmidt – Freshman; 50 – Boots Landry – Freshman; 46 – Blake Binderup (P) – (redshirt) Freshman	Outfielders: 5 – Hayden Schott – Graduate; 13 – Caden Sorrell – Freshman; 17 – Jace LaViolette – Sophomore; 47 – Tab Tracy – Junior'; 52 – Brady Sullivan – Freshman; 6 – Braden Montgomery (P) – Junior; Utility Players: 4 – Travis Chestnut – Senior; 9 – Gavin Grahovac – Freshman; 12 – Ryan Targac – Senior; 36 – Jett Johnston (P) – Freshman; Legend: (P) Player is also a pitcher; Redshirt

=== Coaches ===
2024 Texas A&M Aggies Coaching Staff
- Jim Schlossnagle – Head Coach – 3rd Season
- Nolan Cain – Associate Head Coach – 3rd Season
- Michael Earley – Assistant Coach – 3rd Season
- Max Weiner – Assistant Coach – 1st Season

=== Support Staff ===
2024 Texas A&M Aggies Support Staff
- Jason Hutchins – Director of Baseball Operations – 26th Season
- Chuck Box – Director of Player and Program Development – 3rd Season
- Will Fox – Director of Video and Analytics – 5th Season
- Josh Kesel – Head Strength & Conditioning Coach – 1st Season
- Kalie Swain – Senior Associate Athletic Trainer – 1st Season
- Jack Mahala – Director of Research & Development
- Mindy Phillips – Associate Director, Academic Services
- Roman Gomez – Assistant Strength & Conditioning Coach
- Jace Hutchins – Student assistant

== Schedule and results ==
2024 Texas A&M Aggies baseball game log
Regular season

February (8–0)
Date	Opponent	Rank	Site/stadium	Score	Win	Loss	Save	TV	Attendance	Overall record	SEC record
February 16	McNeese State	No. 8	Blue Bell Park; College Station, TX	**W** 15-0	**Prager** (1–0)	Voss (0–1)		SECN+	7078	1-0	
February 17	McNeese State	No. 8	Blue Bell Park	**W** 6-1	**Peery** (1–0)	Abraham (0–1)	**Badmaev** (1)	SECN+	5818	2-0	
February 18	McNeese State	No. 8	Blue Bell Park	**W** 10-0	**Sdao** (1–0)	Gravel (0–1)		SECN+	5500	3-0	
February 20	Incarnate Word	No. 8	Blue Bell Park	**W** 9-3	**Cortez** (1–0)	Johnson (0–1)		SECN+	4870	4-0	
February 23	Wagner	No. 8	Blue Bell Park	**W** 17-2	**Prager** (2–0)	Wright (0–2)		SECN+	5944	5-0	
February 24	Wagner	No. 8	Blue Bell Park	**W** 2-0	**Lamkin** (1–0)	Hayden (0–1)	**Aschenbeck** (1)	SECN+	6187	6-0	
February 25	Wagner	No. 8	Blue Bell Park	**W** 21-2	**Jones** (1–0)	Taudin-Chabot (0–2)		SECN+	5201	7-0	
February 27	Lamar	No. 7	Blue Bell Park	**W** 13-2	**Moss** (1–0)	Havard (1–2)		SECN+	5161	8-0	

March (17–3)
Date	Opponent	Rank	Site/stadium	Score	Win	Loss	Save	TV	Attendance	Overall record	SEC record
March 1	vs Arizona State	No. 7	Globe Life Field; Arlington, TX	**W** 4-0	**Prager** (3–0)	Burns (1-1)	**Aschenbeck** (2)	FloBaseball.TV	7273	9-0	
March 2	vs USC	No. 7	Globe Life Field	**W** 9-3	**Moss** (2–0)	Stromsborg (0–2)		FloBaseball.TV	10547	10-0	
March 3	vs Arizona State	No. 7	Globe Life Field	**W** 10-5	**Badmaev** (1–0)	Meyer (0–1)		FloBaseball.TV	6516	11-0	
March 5	at Texas	No. 7	UFCU Disch–Falk Field; Austin, TX	**W** 9-2	**Aschenbeck** (1–0)	Witt (0–1)		LHN	8060	12-0	
March 6	Texas Southern	No. 7	Blue Bell Park	**W** 7-4	**Stewart** (1–0)	Castillo (0–1)			4720	13-0	
March 8	Rhode Island	No. 7	Blue Bell Park	**W** 11-0	**Prager** (4–0)	Grotyohann (0–3)		SECN+	5480	14-0	
March 9	Rhode Island	No. 7	Blue Bell Park	**W** 6-0	**Rudis** (1–0)	Maloney (0–1)		SECN+	5964	15-0	
March 10	Rhode Island	No. 7	Blue Bell Park	**W** 12-11	**Aschenbeck** (2–0)	Heon (0–1)		SECN+	5857	16-0	
March 12	Sam Houston State	No. 4	Blue Bell Park	**W** 9-8	**Cortez** (2–0)	David (1–2)		SECN+	7342	17-0	
March 15	at No. 8 Florida	No. 4	Condron Ballpark; Gainesville, FL	**L** 6-8	Fisher (2–1)	**Cortez** (2–1)	Neely (1)	SECN+	5863	17-1	
March 16	at No. 8 Florida	No. 4	Condron Ballpark	**W** 10-6	**Aschenbeck** (3–0)	Peterson (1–2)	**Sdao** (1)	SECN+	6541	18-1	
March 17	at No. 8 Florida	No. 4	Condron Ballpark	**L** 2-4	Neely (1–0)	**Stewart** (1-1)	McNeillie (1)	SECN+	6110	18-2	
March 20	Prairie View A&M	No. 7	Blue Bell Park	**W** 11-9	**Morton** (1–0)	Bravo (3–1)		SECN+	4547	19-2	
March 21	No. 21 Mississippi State	No. 7	Blue Bell Park	**W** 6-3	**Prager** (5–0)	Stevens (2–1)	**Aschenbeck** (3)	ESPNU	4776	20-2	
March 22	No. 21 Mississippi State	No. 7	Blue Bell Park	**L** 1-5	Stephen (3–2)	**Jones** (1-1)		SECN+	6443	20-3	
March 23	No. 21 Mississippi State	No. 7	Blue Bell Park	**W** 6-1	**Lamkin** (2–0)	Cijntje (4–1)		SECN+	7159	21-3	
March 26	Houston Christian	No. 4	Blue Bell Park	**W** 6-3	**Cortez** (3–1)	Coronel (0–2)		SECN+	4784	22-3	
March 28	Auburn	No. 4	Blue Bell Park	**W** 9-7	**Aschenbeck** (4–0)	Carlson (2–1)		SECN+	6466	23-3	
March 29	Auburn	No. 4	Blue Bell Park	**W** 12-8	**Jones** (2–1)	Allsup (1–2)		SECN+	6664	24-3	
March 30	Auburn	No. 4	Blue Bell Park	**W** 10-9	**Moss** (3–0)	Schorr (0–1)		SECN	6484	25-3	

April (14–3)
Date	Opponent	Rank	Site/stadium	Score	Win	Loss	Save	TV	Attendance	Overall record	SEC record
April 2	at Texas State	No. 3	Bobcat Ballpark; San Marcos, TX	**W** 12-2	**Badmaev** (2–0)	Robie (2-2)		ESPN+	2917	26-3	
April 5	at No. 22 South Carolina	No. 3	Founders Park; Columbia, SC	**W** 9-2	**Prager** (6–0)	Jones (2–1)		SECN+	7159	27-3	
April 6	at No. 22 South Carolina	No. 3	Founders Park	**W** 6-3	**Sdao** (2–0)	Pitzer (4–1)	**Aschenbeck** (4)	SECN+	8242	28-3	
April 7	at No. 22 South Carolina	No. 3	Founders Park	**L** 5-6	Veach (2–1)	**Lamkin** (2–1)	Gainey (5)	SECN+	6720	28-4	
April 9	UTSA	No. 3	Blue Bell Park	**W** 6-5	**Cortez** (4–1)	Orloski (3–4)		SECN+	4826	29-4	
April 12	No. 6 Vanderbilt	No. 3	Blue Bell Park	**W** 15-0	**Prager** (7–0)	Cunningham (4–2)		SECN+	7351	30-4	
April 13	No. 6 Vanderbilt	No. 3	Blue Bell Park	**W** 9-0	**Jones** (3–1)	Holton (5–1)		SECN	8075	31-4	
April 14	No. 6 Vanderbilt	No. 3	Blue Bell Park	**W** 12-6	**Cortez** (5–1)	McElvain (1–2)	**Aschenbeck** (5)	SECN+	7063	32-4	
April 16	Air Force	No. 1	Blue Bell Park	**W** 15-5	**Rudis** (2–0)	Brantingham (1–2)		SECN+	5407	33-4	
April 19	at No. 18 Alabama	No. 1	Sewell–Thomas Stadium; Tuscaloosa, AL	**W** 18-9	**Cortez** (6–1)	Fay (1–2)	**Sdao** (2)	SECN+	3691^{a}	34-4	
April 19	at No. 18 Alabama	No. 1	Sewell–Thomas Stadium	**W** 10-5	**Peery** (2–0)	Hess (3–4)		SECN+	—^{a}	35-4	
April 20	at No. 18 Alabama	No. 1	Sewell–Thomas Stadium	**L** 9-10	Davis II (4–1)	**Wilson** (0–1)		SECN+	3995	35-5	
April 23	Houston	No. 1	Blue Bell Park	**W** 13-11	**Rudis** (3–0)	Solis (0–2)	**Aschenbeck** (6)	SECN	6248	36-5	
April 26	No. 20 Georgia	No. 1	Blue Bell Park	**W** 5-2	**Prager** (8–0)	Goldstein (4–1)	**Aschenbeck** (7)	SECN+	7968	37-5	
April 27	No. 20 Georgia	No. 1	Blue Bell Park	**L** 4-5	Sdao (3–0)	**Zeldin** (3–2)		SECN+	7770	37-6	
April 27	No. 20 Georgia	No. 1	Blue Bell Park	**W** 19-9	**Smith** (6–2)	Cortez (6–2)	**Mracna** (1)	SECN+	7021	38-6	
April 30	Tarleton	No. 1	Blue Bell Park	**W** 10-6	**Rudis** (4–0)	Risley (2–5)		SECN+	5919	39-6	

May (5-5)
Date	Opponent	Rank	Site/stadium	Score	Win	Loss	Save	TV	Attendance	Overall record	SEC record
May 3	at LSU	No. 1	Alex Box Stadium; Baton Rouge, LA	**L** 4-6	Ulloa (1-1)	**Prager** (8–1)	Herring (4)	ESPN2	11007	39-7	
May 4	at LSU	No. 1	Alex Box Stadium	**L** 4-6	Little (2–0)	**Sdao** (3–1)	Guidry (2)	ESPN2	11751	39-8	
May 5	at LSU	No. 1	Alex Box Stadium	**W** 14-4	**Cortez** (7–2)	Dutton (0–1)		SECN+	10747	40-8	
May 7	Rice	No. 3	Blue Bell Park	**W** 16-3	**Rudis** (5–0)	Rodriguez (1-1)		SECN+	7111	41-8	
May 10	at Mississippi	No. 3	Swayze Field; Oxford, MS	**L** 3-4	Mendes (2–1)	**Aschenbeck** (4–1)	Spencer (7)	SECN	9155	41-9	
May 11	at Mississippi	No. 3	Swayze Field	**L** 2-10	Doyle (3–2)	**Lamkin** (2-2)		SECN+	9310	41-10	
May 12	at Mississippi	No. 3	Swayze Field	**W** 6-0	**Sdao** (4–1)	Nichols (4–1)		SECN+	9013	42-10	
May 16	No. 3 Arkansas	No. 5	Blue Bell Park	**W** 1-0	**Aschenbeck** (5–1)	Faherty (0–1)		ESPN2	6976	43-10	
May 17	No. 3 Arkansas	No. 5	Blue Bell Park	**L** 3-6	Molina (4–2)	**Stewart** (1–2)		SECN	7980	43-11	
May 18	No. 3 Arkansas	No. 5	Blue Bell Park	**W** 14-4	**Cortez** (8–2)	Dossett (3–1)		SECN	7337	44-11	

Postseason

SEC Tournament (0-2)
Date	Opponent	Seed	Site/stadium	Score	Win	Loss	Save	TV	Attendance	Overall record	SECT Record
May 22	vs (5) Mississippi State	(4)	Hoover Metropolitan Stadium; Hoover, AL	**L** 3-5	Dohm (4–0)	**Cortez** (8–3)	Davis (5)	SECN	11840	44-12	
May 23	vs (1) Tennessee	(4)	Hoover Metropolitan Stadium	**L** 4-7	Causey (11–3)	**Peery** (2–1)		SECN	6825	44-13	

College World Series (3-0)
Date	Opponent	Rank	Stadium Site	Score	Win	Loss	Save	Attendance	Overall Record	CWS Record
June 15	vs Florida	(3)	Charles Schwab Field; Omaha, NE	**W** 3-2	**C. Cortez** (10–3)	L. Peterson (3–5)	**E. Aschenbeck** (10)	25,774	50-13	1-0
June 17	vs (2) Kentucky	(3)	Charles Schwab Field	**W** 5-1	**Prager** (9–1)	Moore (9–4)	None	25,327	51-13	2-0
June 19 (2)	vs Florida	(3)	Charles Schwab Field	**W** 6-0	**J. Lamkin** (3–2)	L. Peterson (3–6)	None	25,429	52-13	3-0
College World Series Finals (1-2)
June 22	vs Tennessee (1)	No. 3 (3)	Charles Schwab Field	**W 9-5**	**Josh Stewart** (2−2)	Chris Stamos (3−1)	None	26,498	53−13	1−0
June 23	vs Tennessee (1)	No. 1 (1)	Charles Schwab Field	**L 1-4**	Aaron Combs (3-1)	**Kaiden Wilson** (0-2)	Nate Snead	25,987	53-14	1-1
June 24	vs Tennessee (1)	No. 3 (3)	Charles Schwab Field	**L 5-6**	Zander Sechrist (6-1)	**Justin Lamkin** (3-3)	Aaron Combs	24,685	53-15	1-2

Schedule and results source • Rankings based on the teams' current ranking in the D1Baseball poll
**W** Texas A&M win • **L** Texas A&M loss • Postponement or cancellation • **Bold** denotes Texas A&M player

== Record vs. conference opponents ==
Last two did not qualify for conf. tourn. Blank are not scheduled. Blue are home games, otherwise away.

2024 SEC baseball records Source: 2024 SEC baseball game results, 2024 SEC baseball schedule
Team	W–L	ALA	ARK	AUB	FLA	UGA	KEN	LSU	MSU	MIZZ	MISS	SCAR	TENN	TAMU	VAN	Team	Div	SR	SW
ALA	13–17		2–1	1–2	.	0–3	0–3	2–1	1–2	.	2–1	2–1	2–1	1–2	.	ALA	W4	5–5	0–2
ARK	20–10	1–2		2–1	2–1	.	1–2	3–0	2–1	3–0	3–0	2–1	.	1–2	.	ARK	W1	7–3	3–0
AUB	8–22	2–1	1–2		.	.	0–3	1–2	0–3	2–1	1–2	.	1–2	0–3	0–3	AUB	W7	2–8	0–4
FLA	13–17	.	1–2	.		2–1	1–2	2–1	2–1	0–3	.	1–2	1–2	2–1	1–2	FLA	E5	4–6	0–1
UGA	17–13	3–0	.	.	1–2		0–3	.	1–2	2–1	2–1	3–0	1–2	1–2	3–0	UGA	E3	5–5	3–1
KEN	22–8	3–0	2–1	3–0	2–1	3–0		.	.	2–1	3–0	1–2	1–2	.	2–1	KEN	E2	8–2	4–0
LSU	13–17	1–2	0–3	2–1	1–2	.	.		1–2	2–1	3–0	.	0–3	2–1	1–2	LSU	W5	4–6	1–2
MSU	17–13	2–1	1–2	3–0	1–2	2–1	.	2–1		2–1	1–2	.		1–2	2–1	MSU	W3	6–4	1–0
MIZZ	9–21	.	0–3	1–2	3–0	1–2	1–2	1–2	1–2		.	1–2	0–3	.	0–3	MIZZ	E7	1–9	1–3
MISS	11–19	1–2	0–3	2–1	.	1–2	0–3	0–3	2–1	.		2–1	1–2	2–1	.	MISS	W6	4–6	0–3
SCAR	13–17	1–2	1–2	.	2–1	0–3	2–1	.	.	2–1	1–2		0–3	1–2	3–0	SCAR	E6	4–6	1–2
TENN	22–8	1–2	.	2–1	2–1	2–1	2–1	3–0	.	3–0	2–1	3–0		.	2–1	TENN	E1	9–1	3–0
TAMU	19–11	2–1	2–1	3–0	1–2	2–1	.	1–2	2–1	.	1–2	2–1	.		3–0	TAMU	W2	7–3	2–0
VAN	13–17	.	.	3–0	2–1	0–3	1–2	2–1	1–2	3–0	.	0–3	1–2	0–3		VAN	E4	4–6	2–3
Team	W–L	ALA	ARK	AUB	FLA	UGA	KEN	LSU	MSU	MIZZ	MISS	SCAR	TENN	TAMU	VAN	Team	Div	SR	SW

Updated for entire regular season. Tie Brkrs: TENN>KEN head to head. MSU>UGA head to head. ALA>VAN & FLA>SCAR & LSU TENN common. VAN>FLA head to head. SCAR>LSU ARK common. ARK SEC Tournament seed>KEN, ARK West champion.

== Rankings ==
Ranking movements Legend: ██ Increase in ranking ██ Decrease in ranking ( ) = First-place votes
	Week																
Poll	Pre	1	2	3	4	5	6	7	8	9	10	11	12	13	14	15	Final
Coaches'	10	10*	7	6	4 (3)	6	4	3	3	1 (22)	1 (29)	1 (29)	2 (7)	4 (1)	3	3	
Baseball America	11	11	11	11	5	10	5	3	3	1	1	1	2	5	4	4	
NCBWA†	10	9	8	6	4	6	4	3	3	1	1	1	2	4	3	3	
D1Baseball	8	8	7	7	4	7	4	3	3	1	1	1	3	5	4	4	
Perfect Game	7	4	4	4	3	7	5	3	3	1	1	1	2	8	5	5	

† NCBWA ranks 30 teams in their preseason poll, but only ranks 25 teams weekly during the season.
* A new poll was not released for this week, so for comparison purposes, the previous week's ranking is inserted in this week's slot.

== Notes ==
a. No separate attendance count for games 1 and 2 of the doubleheader
