= 2024 Vanderbilt Commodores baseball team =

American college baseball season

2024 Vanderbilt Commodores baseball

Clemson Regional, 0–2
- Conference: Southeastern Conference
- Eastern Division

Ranking
- Coaches: No. 12
- D1Baseball.com: No. 13
- Record: 38–23 (13–17 SEC)
- Head coach: Tim Corbin (22nd season)
- Assistant coaches: Scott Brown; Mike Baxter; Tyler Shewmaker
- Home stadium: Hawkins Field

2024 Southeastern Conference baseball standings
	Conf.				Overall
Team	W		L	PCT	W		L	PCT
Eastern
No. 1 Tennessee ^{x}‍†‍‡‍^{y}	22	–	8	.733	60	–	13	.822
No. 3 Kentucky ^{x}‍†‍‍^{y}	22	–	8	.733	46	–	16	.742
No. 11 Georgia ‍‍‍^{y}	17	–	13	.567	43	–	17	.717
Vanderbilt ‍‍‍^{y}	13	–	17	.433	38	–	23	.623
No. 8 Florida ‍‍‍^{y}	13	–	17	.433	36	–	30	.545
South Carolina ‍‍‍^{y}	13	–	17	.433	37	–	25	.597
Missouri ‍‍‍	9	–	21	.300	23	–	32	.418
Western
No. 17 Arkansas ^{x}‍‍‍^{y}	20	–	10	.667	44	–	16	.733
No. 2 Texas A&M ‍‍‍^{y}	19	–	11	.633	53	–	15	.779
No. 22 Mississippi State ‍‍‍^{y}	17	–	13	.567	40	–	23	.635
Alabama ‍‍‍^{y}	13	–	17	.433	33	–	24	.579
LSU ‍‍‍^{y}	13	–	17	.433	43	–	23	.652
Ole Miss ‍‍‍	11	–	19	.367	27	–	29	.482
Auburn ‍‍‍	8	–	22	.267	27	–	26	.509
x – Division champion † – Conference champion ‡ – Tournament champion y – Invited to the NCAA Tournament; As of June 24, 2024; Rankings from D1Baseball

The 2024 Vanderbilt Commodores baseball team represented Vanderbilt University in the 2024 NCAA Division I baseball season. The Commodores played their home games at Hawkins Field.

== Previous season ==
In 2023, the Commodores finished 42–20, 19–11 in the SEC to finish second place in the Eastern Division. They would go on to win the 2023 Southeastern Conference baseball tournament, beating Texas A&M to win the conference. They played in the Nashville Regional of the 2023 NCAA Division I baseball tournament, being knocked out of the tournament by Xavier.

== Personnel ==
=== Roster ===
2024 Vanderbilt Commodores roster
Pitchers: 17 – Ryan Ginther – Junior; 20 – Carter Holton – Junior; 22 – JD Thompson – Sophomore; 30 – Ethan Robinson – Freshman; 31 – Duke Ekstrom – Freshman; 33 – Luke Guth – Freshman; 34 – Brennan Seiber – Freshman; 35 – Nik Copenhaver – Freshman; 36 – Levi Huesman – Sophomore; 37 – Jacob Schulz – Freshman; 38 – David Horn Jr. – Sophomore; 40 – Sam Hliboki – Fifth Year; 55 – Colton Regen – Junior; 66 – Deegan Cordova – Freshman; 77 – Alex Kranzler – Freshman; 80 – Andrew Dutkyanch IV – Sophomore; 88 – Sawyer Hawks – Junior; 89 – Ethan McElvain – Freshman; 90 – Miller Green – Freshman; 95 – Devin Futrell – Junior; 96 – Nate Teague – Freshman; 97 – Bryce Cunningham – Junior; 98 – Greysen Carter – Junior	Catchers: 5 – Logan Poteet – Sophomore; 16 – Jack Bulger – Senior; 44 – Colin Barczi – Freshman; 45 – Alan Espinal – Senior; Infielders: 6 – Matt Wolfe – Sophomore; 8 – Chris Maldonado – Sophomore; 9 – Ray Velasquez – Sophomore; 11 – Davis Diaz – Junior; 13 – Jonathan Vastine – Junior; 25 – Matt Ossenfort – Freshman; 26 – Braden Holcomb – Freshman; 28 – Camden Kozeal – Freshman	Outfielders: 18 – JD Rogers – Junior; 19 – Troy LaNeve – Fifth Year; 21 – Calvin Hewett – Senior; 23 – Devan Kodali – Sophomore; 32 – Cooper Holbrook – Sophomore; Utility players: 1 – Matthew Polk – Junior; 2 – RJ Hamilton – Freshman; 10 – Jacob Humphrey – Junior; 27 – Kaito Muto – Freshman; 42 – RJ Austin – Sophomore

=== Coaching staff ===
2024 Vanderbilt Commodores coaching staff
Name	Position
Tim Corbin	Head coach
Scott Brown	Associate Head Coach
Mike Baxter	Assistant Coach
Tyler Shewmaker	Assistant Coach

== Schedule and results ==
2024 Vanderbilt Commodores baseball game log (38–23)
Regular season (35–20)

February (7–3)
Date	Opponent	Rank	Site/stadium	Score	Win	Loss	Save	TV	Attendance	Overall record	SEC record
February 16	Florida Atlantic*	No. 6	Hawkins Field	**W** 12–11	**Thompson** (1–0)	Ostrander (0–1)	None		3,542	1–0	—
February 17	Florida Atlantic*	No. 6	Hawkins Field	**L** 4–5	Boully (1–0)	**Green** (0–1)	None		3,383	1–1	—
February 18	Florida Atlantic*	No. 6	Hawkins Field	**W** 11–1	**Futrell** (1–0)	Smith (0–1)	**Seiber** (1)		3,579	2–1	—
February 20	Dayton*	No. 6	Hawkins Field	**L** 5–8	Wissman (1–0)	**McElvain** (0–1)	None		3,211	2–2	—
February 21	Eastern Kentucky*	No. 6	Hawkins Field	**W** 5–3	**Huesman** (1–0)	Milburn (0–2)	None		3,307	3–2	—
February 23	Gonzaga*	No. 6	Hawkins Field	**W** 12–2^{8}	**Holton** (1–0)	Paddack (0–1)	**Carter** (1)		3,567	4–2	—
February 24	Gonzaga*	No. 6	Hawkins Field	**W** 4–3	**Seiber** (1–0)	Hoffberg (0–1)	None		3,511	5–2	—
February 25	Gonzaga*	No. 6	Hawkins Field	**L** 8–9	Mueller (1–0)	**Kranzler** (0–2)	Sotelo (1)		3,798	5–3	—
February 27	Indiana State*	No. 9	Hawkins Field	**W** 20–4^{7}	**Thompson** (2–0)	Cutts (1–1)	None		3,178	6–3	—
February 28	Evansville*	No. 9	Hawkins Field	**W** 7–3	**Ginther** (1–0)	Harris (1–2)	None		3,227	7–3	—

March (16–3)
Date	Opponent	Rank	Site/stadium	Score	Win	Loss	Save	TV	Attendance	Overall record	SEC record
2024 Astros Foundation College Classic
March 1	vs. Louisiana*	No. 9	Minute Maid Park; Houston, TX	**W** 7–4	**Carter** (1–0)	Martinez (0–2)	**Green** (1)			8–3	—
March 2	vs. Houston*	No. 9	Minute Maid Park	**W** 3–1	**Cunningham** (1–0)	Jeam (1–1)	**Seiber** (2)			9–3	—
March 3	vs. No. 15 Texas*	No. 9	Minute Maid Park	**W** 14–11	**Hawks** (1–0)	Fontenot (0–1)	**Ginther** (2)			10–3	—
March 5	Eastern Michigan*	No. 9	Hawkins Field	**W** 6–2	**Thompson** (3–0)	Jones (0–1)	None	SECN+	3,159	11–3	—
March 8	Illinois State*	No. 9	Hawkins Field	**W** 14–9	**Holton** (2–0)	Mabee (2–1)	None	SECN+	3,395	12–3	—
March 9	Illinois State*	No. 9	Hawkins Field	**W** 7–2	**Cunningham** (2–0)	Chadwick (2–2)	None	SECN+	3,496	13–3	—
March 10	Illinois State*	No. 9	Hawkins Field	**W** 4–0	**Futrell** (2–0)	Perry (0–3)	None	SECN+	3,534	14–3	—
March 12	Indiana*	No. 9	Hawkins Field	**W** 13–5	**Hawks** (2–0)	Manase (1–1)	None	SECN+	3,668	15–3	—
March 15	No. 18 Auburn	No. 9	Hawkins Field	**W** 11–1^{8}	**Holton** (3–0)	Allsup (1–1)	None	SECN+	3,802	16–3	1–0
March 16	No. 18 Auburn	No. 9	Hawkins Field	**W** 13–5	**Cunningham** (3–0)	Myers (1–2)	None	SECN+	3,802	17–3	2–0
March 17	No. 18 Auburn	No. 9	Hawkins Field	**W** 9–6	**Carter** (2–0)	Bauman (2–1)	**Ginther** (3)	SECN+	3,802	18–3	3–0
March 19	vs. Belmont*	No. 3	First Horizon Park; Nashville, TN	**W** 3–1	**Hliboki** (1–0)	Ciuffetelli (0–1)	**Seiber** (3)		2,116	19–3	—
March 23 (DH)	at South Carolina	No. 3	Founders Park; Columbia, SC	**L** 4–8	Veach (1–1)	**Green** (0–2)	Gainey (3)	SECN+	7,712	19–4	3–1
March 23 (DH)	at South Carolina	No. 3	Founders Park	**L** 3–8	Good (2–0)	**Cunningham** (3–1)	Gainey (4)	SECN+	8,242	19–5	3–2
March 24	at South Carolina	No. 3	Founders Park	**L** 2–10	Pitzer (4–0)	**Futrell** (2–1)	None	SECN+	7,133	19–6	3–3
March 26	Valparaiso*	No. 7	Hawkins Field	**W** 3–2	**Green** (1–2)	Konitzer (0–1)	**Seiber** (4)	SECN+	3,628	20–6	–
March 28	Missouri	No. 7	Hawkins Field	**W** 3–1	**Carter** (3–0)	Rustad (3–4)	**Ginther** (4)	SECN+	3,802	21–6	4–3
March 29	Missouri	No. 7	Hawkins Field	**W** 4–0	**Cunningham** (4–1)	Lunceford (1–2)	None	SECN+	3,802	22–6	5–3
March 30	Missouri	No. 7	Hawkins Field	**W** 3–1	**Holton** (4–0)	Pimental (1–1)	**Green** (2)	SECN+	3,802	23–6	6–3

April (9–7)
Date	Opponent	Rank	Site/stadium	Score	Win	Loss	Save	TV	Attendance	Overall record	SEC record
April 2	Western Kentucky*	No. 7	Hawkins Field	Canceled							
April 4	at No. 18 LSU	No. 7	Alex Box Stadium; Baton Rouge, LA	**L** 6–10	Holman (6–1)	**Carter** (2–1)	Herring (3)	SECN+	10,778	23–7	6–4
April 5	at No. 18 LSU	No. 7	Alex Box Stadium	**W** 8—6	**McElvain** (1–1)	Ackenhausen (2–4)	None	SECN+	12,315	24–7	7–4
April 6	at No. 18 LSU	No. 7	Alex Box Stadium	**W** 13–3^{8}	**Holton** (5–0)	Coleman (2–1)	None	SECN+	12,076	25–7	8–4
April 9	Middle Tennessee State*	No. 6	Hawkins Field	**W** 14–1^{7}	**Guth** (1–0)	Sato (0–2)	None	SECN+	3,271	26–7	–
April 12	at No. 3 Texas A&M	No. 6	Blue Bell Park; College Station, TX	**L** 0–15^{7}	Prager (7–0)	**Cunningham** (4–2)	None	SECN+	7,351	26–8	8–5
April 13	at No. 3 Texas A&M	No. 6	Hawkins Field	**L** 0–9	Jones (3–1)	**Holton** (5–1)	None	SECN	8,075	26–9	8–6
April 14	at No. 3 Texas A&M	No. 6	Hawkins Field	**L** 6–12	Cortez (5–1)	**McElvain** (1–2)	Aschenbeck (5)	SECN+	7,063	26–10	8–7
April 16	at Lipscomb*		Dugan Field; Nashville, TN	**W** 15–4^{7}	**Seiber** (2–0)	Harmon (2–2)	None	ESPN+	1,547	27–10	–
April 18	Florida	No. 13	Hawkins Field	**W** 10–5	**Cunningham** (5–2)	Neely (1–2)	**Carter** (2)	ESPNU	3,802	28–10	9–7
April 19	Florida	No. 13	Hawkins Field	**W** 5–2	**Holton** (6–1)	Coppola (0–2)	**Carter** (3)	ESPN2	3,802	29–10	10–7
April 20	Florida	No. 13	Hawkins Field	**L** 2–6	Caglianone (5–0)	**Guth** (1–1)	Jameson (1)	SECN+	3,802	29–11	10–8
April 23	UT Martin*	No. 11	Hawkins Field	**W** 5–4	**Seiber** (3–0)	Arender (0–2)	None	SECN+	3,450	30–11	–
April 26	Mississippi State	No. 11	Hawkins Field	**W** 4–0	**Cunningham** (6–2)	Stephen (6–3)	None	SECN+	3,802	31–11	11–8
April 27	Mississippi State	No. 11	Hawkins Field	**L** 4–7	Auger (1–1)	**Holton** (6–2)	Davis (2)	SECN+	3,802	31–12	11–9
April 28	Mississippi State	No. 11	Hawkins Field	**L** 7–8	Ligon (1–0)	**Green** (1–3)	Hardin (2)	SECN+	3,802	31–13	11–10
April 30	Tennessee Tech*	No. 17	Hawkins Field	**W** 8–7^{11}	**Carter** (4–1)	Vargas (2–1)	None	SECN+	3,614	32–13	–

May (3–7)
Date	Opponent	Rank	Site/stadium	Score	Win	Loss	Save	TV	Attendance	Overall record	SEC record
May 3	at No. 19 Georgia	No. 17	Foley Field; Athens, GA	**L** 0–10^{7}	Finley (4–1)	**Cunningham** (6–3)	None	SECN+	4,027	32–14	11–11
May 4	at No. 19 Georgia	No. 17	Foley Field	**L** 4–14^{8}	Smith (7–2)	**Holton** (6–3)	None	SECN+	3,738	32–15	11–12
May 5	at No. 19 Georgia	No. 17	Foley Field	**L** 7–11	Harris (5–0)	**Thompson** (3–1)	Marsh (1)	SECN+	3,333	32–16	11–13
May 7	Louisville*		Hawkins Field	**W** 4–2	**Futrell** (3–1)	West (2–1)	**Green** (3)	ESPN2	3,550	33–16	–
May 10	No. 1 Tennessee		Hawkins Field	**L** 4–8	Causey (9–3)	**Green** (1–4)	None	SECN+	3,802	33–17	11–14
May 11	No. 1 Tennessee		Hawkins Field	**L** 6–7	Beam (7–2)	**Carter** (4–2)	Snead (4)	SECN	3,802	33–18	11–15
May 12	No. 1 Tennessee		Hawkins Field	**W** 3–0	**Thompson** (4–1)	Sechrist (1–1)	**Futrell** (1)	ESPN2	3,802	34–18	12–15
May 16	at No. 2 Kentucky		Kentucky Proud Park; Lexington, KY	**L** 5–10	Pooser (4–1)	**Cunningham** (6–4)	None	SECN+	4,384	34–19	12–16
May 17	at No. 2 Kentucky		Kentucky Proud Park	**L** 7–17^{7}	Hagenow (2–0)	**Holton** (6–4)	None	SECN+	4,071	34–20	12–17
May 18	at No. 2 Kentucky		Kentucky Proud Park	**W** 12–4	**Futrell** (4–1)	Moore (8–2)	None	SECN+	5,641	35–20	13–17

Postseason (3–3)

SEC tournament (3–1)
Date	Opponent	Rank	Site/stadium	Score	Win	Loss	Save	TV	Attendance	Overall record	Tournament record
May 21	vs. (9) Florida	(8)	Hoover Metropolitan Stadium; Hoover, AL	**W** 6–3	**Cunningham** (7–4)	Coppola (0–4)	**Seiber** (5)	SECN	9,240	36–20	1–0
May 22	vs. No. 1 (1) Tennessee	(8)	Hoover Metropolitan Stadium	**W** 13–4	**Green** (2–4)	Snead (8–2)	None	SECN	11,840	37–20	2–0
May 23	vs. No. 15 (5) Mississippi State	(8)	Hoover Metropolitan Stadium	**W** 4–3	**Thompson** (5–1)	Cijntje (8–2)	**Ginther** (5)	SECN	11,923	38–20	3–0
May 25	vs. No. 1 (1) Tennessee	(8)	Hoover Metropolitan Stadium	**L** 4–6	Sechrist (3–1)	**Guth** (1–2)	Phillips (3)	SECN	14,386	38–21	3–1

Clemson Regional (0–2)
Date	Opponent	Rank	Site/stadium	Score	Win	Loss	Save	TV	Attendance	Overall record	Tournament record
May 31	vs. (3) Coastal Carolina	(2)	Doug Kingsmore Stadium; Clemson, SC	**L** 3–13	Eikhoff (6–1)	**Thompson** (5–2)	None	ESPN2	5,403	38–22	0–1
June 1	vs. (4) High Point	(2)	Doug Kingsmore Stadium	**L** 9–10	Baker (2–0)	**Holton** (6–5)	None	ESPN+	5,189	38–23	0–2

*Denotes non–conference game • Schedule source • Rankings based on the teams' current ranking in the D1Baseball poll
**W** Vanderbilt win • **L** Vanderbilt loss • Postponement or cancellation • **Bold** denotes Vanderbilt player

== Record vs. conference opponents ==
Last two did not qualify for conf. tourn. Blank are not scheduled. Blue are home games, otherwise away.

2024 SEC baseball records Source: 2024 SEC baseball game results, 2024 SEC baseball schedule
Team	W–L	ALA	ARK	AUB	FLA	UGA	KEN	LSU	MSU	MIZZ	MISS	SCAR	TENN	TAMU	VAN	Team	Div	SR	SW
ALA	13–17		2–1	1–2	.	0–3	0–3	2–1	1–2	.	2–1	2–1	2–1	1–2	.	ALA	W4	5–5	0–2
ARK	20–10	1–2		2–1	2–1	.	1–2	3–0	2–1	3–0	3–0	2–1	.	1–2	.	ARK	W1	7–3	3–0
AUB	8–22	2–1	1–2		.	.	0–3	1–2	0–3	2–1	1–2	.	1–2	0–3	0–3	AUB	W7	2–8	0–4
FLA	13–17	.	1–2	.		2–1	1–2	2–1	2–1	0–3	.	1–2	1–2	2–1	1–2	FLA	E5	4–6	0–1
UGA	17–13	3–0	.	.	1–2		0–3	.	1–2	2–1	2–1	3–0	1–2	1–2	3–0	UGA	E3	5–5	3–1
KEN	22–8	3–0	2–1	3–0	2–1	3–0		.	.	2–1	3–0	1–2	1–2	.	2–1	KEN	E2	8–2	4–0
LSU	13–17	1–2	0–3	2–1	1–2	.	.		1–2	2–1	3–0	.	0–3	2–1	1–2	LSU	W5	4–6	1–2
MSU	17–13	2–1	1–2	3–0	1–2	2–1	.	2–1		2–1	1–2	.		1–2	2–1	MSU	W3	6–4	1–0
MIZZ	9–21	.	0–3	1–2	3–0	1–2	1–2	1–2	1–2		.	1–2	0–3	.	0–3	MIZZ	E7	1–9	1–3
MISS	11–19	1–2	0–3	2–1	.	1–2	0–3	0–3	2–1	.		2–1	1–2	2–1	.	MISS	W6	4–6	0–3
SCAR	13–17	1–2	1–2	.	2–1	0–3	2–1	.	.	2–1	1–2		0–3	1–2	3–0	SCAR	E6	4–6	1–2
TENN	22–8	1–2	.	2–1	2–1	2–1	2–1	3–0	.	3–0	2–1	3–0		.	2–1	TENN	E1	9–1	3–0
TAMU	19–11	2–1	2–1	3–0	1–2	2–1	.	1–2	2–1	.	1–2	2–1	.		3–0	TAMU	W2	7–3	2–0
VAN	13–17	.	.	3–0	2–1	0–3	1–2	2–1	1–2	3–0	.	0–3	1–2	0–3		VAN	E4	4–6	2–3
Team	W–L	ALA	ARK	AUB	FLA	UGA	KEN	LSU	MSU	MIZZ	MISS	SCAR	TENN	TAMU	VAN	Team	Div	SR	SW

Updated for entire regular season. Tie Brkrs: TENN>KEN head to head. MSU>UGA head to head. ALA>VAN & FLA>SCAR & LSU TENN common. VAN>FLA head to head. SCAR>LSU ARK common. ARK SEC Tournament seed>KEN, ARK West champion.

== Rankings ==
Ranking movements Legend: ██ Increase in ranking ██ Decrease in ranking
	Week																		
Poll	Pre	1	2	3	4	5	6	7	8	9	10	11	12	13	14	15	16	17	Final
Coaches'	6	6*	14	10	10	3	9	6	6	12									
Baseball America	7	7	9	9	8	2	7	6	5	13									
NCBWA†	7	10	13	12	10	4	9	6	6	13									
D1Baseball	6	6	9	9	9	3	7	7	6	13									
Perfect Game	6	7	11	9	8	3	8	8	6	12									

† NCBWA ranks 30 teams in their preseason poll, but only ranks 25 teams weekly during the season.
* A new poll was not released for this week, so for comparison purposes, the previous week's ranking is inserted in this week's slot.
