= Butch Thompson (baseball) =

American baseball coach

Current position
- Title: Head coach
- Team: Auburn
- Conference: SEC
- Record: 366–254–1
- Annual salary: $1,280,000

Biographical details
- Born: December 15, 1970 (age 55); Aberdeen, Mississippi, U.S.

Playing career
- 1989–1990: Itawamba Community College
- 1991–1992: Birmingham–Southern
- Position: Pitcher

Coaching career (HC unless noted)
- 1993: Huntingdon (Asst.)
- 1994–1996: Birmingham–Southern (Asst.)
- 1997: Jefferson State
- 1998–2001: Birmingham–Southern (Asst.)
- 2002–2005: Georgia (Asst.)
- 2006–2008: Auburn (Asst.)
- 2009–2015: Mississippi State (Asst.)
- 2016–present: Auburn

Head coaching record
- Overall: 366–254–1 (NCAA); 39–21 (NJCAA)

Accomplishments and honors

Championships
- 2 College World Series appearances (2019, 2022)

Awards
- American Baseball Coaches Association Assistant Coach of The Year (2014)

Butch Thompson (born December 15, 1970) is an American baseball coach and former pitcher, who is the current head baseball coach of the Auburn Tigers. He was named to that position prior to the 2016 NCAA Division I baseball season. He has led Auburn to the College World Series in 2019 and 2022. In 2014, he was named the ABCA/Baseball America Assistant Coach of the Year.

== Playing career ==
Thompson played two seasons at Itawamba Community College before his final two years of eligibility at Birmingham–Southern.

== Head coaching record ==
Record table
Season	Team	Overall	Conference	Standing	Postseason
Jefferson State (AJCAA Region 22) (1997)
1997	Jefferson State	39–21		1st	NJCAA World Series
Jefferson State:		39–21 (.650)	(–)		
Auburn Tigers (Southeastern Conference) (2016–present)
2016	Auburn	23–33	8–22	6th (West)	
2017	Auburn	37–26	16–14	4th (West)	NCAA regional
2018	Auburn	43–23	15–15	T–3rd (West)	NCAA Super Regional
2019	Auburn	38–28	14–16	6th (West)	College World Series
2020	Auburn	13–5	0–0	(West)	Season canceled due to COVID-19
2021	Auburn	25–27	10–20	6th (West)	
2022	Auburn	43–22	16–13	4th (West)	College World Series
2023	Auburn	34–23–1	17–13	3rd (West)	NCAA regional
2024	Auburn	27–25	8–21	7th (West)	
2025	Auburn	41–20	17–13	6th	NCAA Super Regional
2026	Auburn	42–22	17–13	T–6th	NCAA Super Regional
Auburn:		366–254–1 (.590)	138–160 (.463)		
Total:		366–254–1 (.590)			
National champion Postseason invitational champion Conference regular season champion Conference regular season and conference tournament champion Division regular season champion Division regular season and conference tournament champion Conference tournament champion

== See also ==
- List of current NCAA Division I baseball coaches
