= 2024 Arkansas Razorbacks baseball team =

American college baseball team

2024 Arkansas Razorbacks baseball
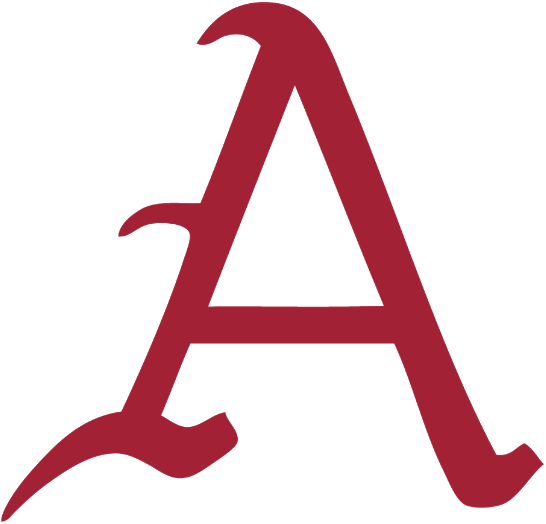

SEC West Division champions

Fayetteville Regional, 1–2
- Conference: Southeastern Conference
- Western Division

Ranking
- Coaches: No. 2
- D1Baseball.com: No. 3
- Record: 44–16 (20–10 SEC)
- Head coach: Dave Van Horn (22nd season)
- Assistant coaches: Matt Hobbs; Nate Thompson Bobby Wernes
- Home stadium: Baum–Walker Stadium

2024 Southeastern Conference baseball standings
	Conf.				Overall
Team	W		L	PCT	W		L	PCT
Eastern
No. 1 Tennessee ^{x}‍†‍‡‍^{y}	22	–	8	.733	60	–	13	.822
No. 3 Kentucky ^{x}‍†‍‍^{y}	22	–	8	.733	46	–	16	.742
No. 11 Georgia ‍‍‍^{y}	17	–	13	.567	43	–	17	.717
Vanderbilt ‍‍‍^{y}	13	–	17	.433	38	–	23	.623
No. 8 Florida ‍‍‍^{y}	13	–	17	.433	36	–	30	.545
South Carolina ‍‍‍^{y}	13	–	17	.433	37	–	25	.597
Missouri ‍‍‍	9	–	21	.300	23	–	32	.418
Western
No. 17 Arkansas ^{x}‍‍‍^{y}	20	–	10	.667	44	–	16	.733
No. 2 Texas A&M ‍‍‍^{y}	19	–	11	.633	53	–	15	.779
No. 22 Mississippi State ‍‍‍^{y}	17	–	13	.567	40	–	23	.635
Alabama ‍‍‍^{y}	13	–	17	.433	33	–	24	.579
LSU ‍‍‍^{y}	13	–	17	.433	43	–	23	.652
Ole Miss ‍‍‍	11	–	19	.367	27	–	29	.482
Auburn ‍‍‍	8	–	22	.267	27	–	26	.509
x – Division champion † – Conference champion ‡ – Tournament champion y – Invited to the NCAA Tournament; As of June 24, 2024; Rankings from D1Baseball

The 2024 Arkansas Razorbacks baseball team represented the University of Arkansas in the 2024 season. The Razorbacks played their home games at Baum–Walker Stadium in Fayetteville, Arkansas.

== Previous season ==
Arkansas spent most of the year in the top 10. They were co-champions of the Southeastern Conference, and hosted the Fayetteville Regional at Baum-Walker Stadium but were eliminated by TCU and ended the season in a regional for the first time since 2017.

== Roster ==
2024 Arkansas Razorbacks roster and coaching staff
Pitchers: 11 Jaewoo Cho (R) – Freshman; 20 Gabe Gaeckle (R) – Freshman; 21 Mason Molina (L) – Junior; 25 Brady Tygart (R) – Junior; 26 Tate McGuire (R) – Freshman; 28 Koty Frank (R) – Graduate; 31 Dylan Carter (R) – (redshirt) Junior; 32 Hunter Deitz (L) – Freshman; 33 Hagen Smith (L) – Junior; 34 Diego Ramos (R) – Freshman; 36 Parker Coil (L) – Sophomore; 37 Jake Faherty (R) – Junior; 38 Colin Fisher (L) – Freshman; 39 Tucker Holland (L) – Freshman; 40 Ben Bybee (R) – Sophomore; 41 Will McEntire (R) – (redshirt) Senior; 45 Gage Wood (R) – Sophomore; 46 Christian Foutch (R) – Sophomore; 48 Cooper Dossett (R) – Sophomore; 49 Stone Hewlett (L) – Senior; 51 Jack Smith (L) – Freshman; 55 Josh Hyneman (R) – (redshirt) Freshman; 61 Adam Hachman (L) – Freshman	Catchers: 8 Hudson White – Junior; 16 Hudson Polk – Senior; 27 Ryder Helfrick – Freshman; 44 Parker Rowland – Senior; Infielders: 3 Nolan Souza – Freshman; 6 Ben McLaughlin – Senior; 9 Wehiwa Aloy – Sophomore; 10 Peyton Stovall – Junior; 12 Jared Sprague-Lott – Senior; 18 Reese Robinett – Sophomore; Outfielders: 1 Ty Wilmsmeyer – Graduate; 5 Kendall Diggs – Junior; 14 Ross Lovich – Senior; 17 Hunter Grimes – (redshirt) Senior; 19 Will Edmunson – Junior; 43 Kade Smith – Freshman	Infielder/Outfielders: 4 Jack Wagner – Graduate; 13 Jayson Jones – Sophomore; 22 Ty Waid – Freshman; 24 Peyton Holt – Senior; Coaching staff: Dave Van Horn – Head coach; Nate Thompson – Assistant coach; Matt Hobbs – Assistant coach; Bobby Wernes – Assistant coach

== Schedule and results ==
2024 Arkansas Razorbacks baseball game log
Regular season

February (6–2)
Date	Opponent	Rank	Site/stadium	Score	Win	Loss	Save	TV	Attendance	Overall record	SEC record
February 16	James Madison	No. 3	Baum–Walker Stadium; Fayetteville, Arkansas	**W** 6–4	**McEntire** (1–0)	Mozoki (0–1)	**Wood** (1)	SECN+	9,432	1–0	—
February 17	James Madison	No. 3	Baum–Walker Stadium	**W** 15–5 (8)	**Tygart** (1–0)	Kuhle (0–1)	**Frank** (1)	SECN+	10,096	2–0	—
February 18	James Madison	No. 3	Baum–Walker Stadium	**L** 3–7	Vogatsky (1–0)	**Gaeckle** (0–1)		SECN+	9,134	2–1	—
February 19	James Madison	No. 3	Baum–Walker Stadium	**W** 4–0	**Fisher** (1–0)	Smith (0–1)		SECN+	8,648	3–1	—
College Baseball Series
February 23	No. 7 Oregon State	No. 2	Globe Life Field; Arlington, Texas	**W** 5–4	**Wood** (1–0)	Hutchison (0–1)	**Faherty** (1)	FloBaseball	13,038	4–1	—
February 24	Oklahoma State	No. 2	Globe Life Field	**L** 1–2 (14)	Molsky (1–0)	**Fisher** (1–1)		FloBaseball	16,271	4–2	—
February 25	Michigan	No. 2	Globe Life Field	**W** 4–3	**Molina** (1–0)	Vigue (0–1)	**Frank** (2)	FloBaseball		5–2	—
February 27	Grambling State	No. 2	Baum–Walker Stadium	**W** 21–1 (7)	**Fisher** (2–1)	Peguero (0–2)		SECN+	8,913	6–2	—

March (17–1)
Date	Opponent	Rank	Site/stadium	Score	Win	Loss	Save	TV	Attendance	Overall record	SEC record
March 1	Murray State	No. 2	Baum–Walker Stadium	**W** 5–1	**Smith** (1–0)	Vernon (1–1)	**Gaeckle** (1)	SECN+	9,215	7–2	—
March 2	Murray State	No. 2	Baum–Walker Stadium	**W** 11–1 (8)	**Tygart** (2–0)	Valero (1–2)		SECN+	11,048	8–2	—
March 3	Murray State	No. 2	Baum–Walker Stadium	**W** 5–3	**Molina** (2–0)	Fender (0–1)	**McEntire** (1)	SECN+	9,396	9–2	—
March 5	Central Arkansas	No. 2	Baum–Walker Stadium	**W** 9–7	**Fisher** (3–1)	Parlin (0–2)	**Gaeckle** (2)	SECN+	8,948	10–2	—
March 9 (DH)	McNeese	No. 2	Baum–Walker Stadium	**W** 3–1	**Smith** (2–0)	LeJeune (2–1)	**Gaeckle** (3)	SECN+	11,031	11–2	—
March 9 (DH)	McNeese	No. 2	Baum–Walker Stadium	**W** 11–1 (8)	**Tygart** (3–0)	Voss (0–3)	**Frank** (3)	SECN+	11,031	12–2	—
March 10	McNeese	No. 2	Baum–Walker Stadium	**W** 18–5 (7)	**Wood** (2–0)	Morrow (3–1)		SECN+	9,296	13–2	—
March 12	Oral Roberts	No. 1	Baum–Walker Stadium	**W** 4–2	**Fisher** (4–1)	Sanford (1–2)	**Gaeckle** (4)	SECN+	9,401	14–2	—
March 15	Missouri	No. 1	Baum–Walker Stadium	**W** 8–0	**Smith** (3–0)	Lunceford (1–1)		SECN+	10,109	15–2	1–0
March 16	Missouri	No. 1	Baum–Walker Stadium	**W** 6–0	**McEntire** (2–0)	Mayer (0–4)		SECN+	10,434	16–2	2–0
March 17	Missouri	No. 1	Baum–Walker Stadium	**W** 9–1	**Molina** (3–0)	Rustad (3–2)		SECN+	9,867	17–2	3–0
March 21	at No. 23 Auburn	No. 1	Plainsman Park; Auburn, Alabama	**W** 1–0	**Smith** (4–0)	McBride (3–1)	**Gaeckle** (5)	SEC Network	4,410	18–2	4–0
March 22	at No. 23 Auburn	No. 1	Plainsman Park	**W** 6–5	**Dossett** (1–0)	Armstrong (0–1)	**McEntire** (2)	SECN+	4,006	19–2	5–0
March 23	at No. 23 Auburn	No. 1	Plainsman Park	**L** 6–8	Carlson (2–0)	**Gaeckle** (0–2)	Cannon (1)	SECN+	5,087	19–3	5–1
March 26	Little Rock	No. 1	Baum–Walker Stadium	**W** 11–0 (7)	**Bybee** (1–0)	Stubber (4–1)		SECN+	8,537	20–3	—
March 28	No. 8 LSU	No. 1	Baum–Walker Stadium	**W** 7–4	**Smith** (5–0)	Ulloa (0–1)	**Hewlett** (1)	ESPN2	11,027	21–3	6–1
March 29	No. 8 LSU	No. 1	Baum–Walker Stadium	**W** 4–3 (10)	**Hewlett** (1–0)	Hurd (1–4)		SEC Network	11,156	22–3	7–1
March 30	No. 8 LSU	No. 1	Baum–Walker Stadium	**W** 7–5	**Frank** (1–0)	Ackenhausen (2–3)	**McEntire** (3)	SECN+	10,924	23–3	8–1

April (15–4)
Date	Opponent	Rank	Site/stadium	Score	Win	Loss	Save	TV	Attendance	Overall record	SEC record
April 2	Arkansas State	No. 1	Baum–Walker Stadium	**W** 13–0 (7)	**Fisher** (5–1)	Turner (1–2)		SECN+	8,988	24–3	—
April 4	Ole Miss	No. 1	Baum–Walker Stadium	**W** 5–2	**Smith** (6–0)	Maddox (2–3)	**Hewlett** (2)	SEC Network	10,231	25–3	9–1
April 5	Ole Miss	No. 1	Baum–Walker Stadium	**W** 8–3	**Frank** (2–0)	Doyle (2–2)		SECN+	11,234	26–3	10–1
April 6	Ole Miss	No. 1	Baum–Walker Stadium	**W** 7–4	**Gaeckle** (1–2)	Spencer (0–2)	**McEntire** (4)	SECN+	11,184	27–3	11–1
April 9	San Jose State	No. 1	Baum–Walker Stadium	**W** 5–1	**Bybee** (2–0)	Chase (1–1)		SECN+	8,931	28–3	—
April 10	San Jose State	No. 1	Baum–Walker Stadium	**W** 8–2	**Fisher** (6–1)	Albanese (1–1)		SECN+	8,617	29–3	—
April 12	at No. 25 Alabama	No. 1	Sewell–Thomas Stadium; Tuscaloosa, Alabama	**W** 5–3	**Smith** (7–0)	Hess (3–3)	**Gaeckle** (6)	SECN+	5,524	30–3	12–1
April 13	at No. 25 Alabama	No. 1	Sewell–Thomas Stadium	**L** 3–4 (10)	Davis (3–1)	**Faherty** (0–1)		SECN+	5,800	30–4	12–2
April 14	at No. 25 Alabama	No. 1	Sewell–Thomas Stadium	**L** 0–5	Adams (3–2)	**Tygart** (3–1)		SECN+	3,959	30–5	12–3
April 16	Texas Tech	No. 2	Baum–Walker Stadium	**W** 9–8	**Gaeckle** (2–2)	Hutyra (4–1)		ESPN2	9,770	31–5	—
April 17	Texas Tech	No. 2	Baum–Walker Stadium	**W** 5–4	**Dossett** (2–0)	Bridges (0–1)	**Hewlett** (3)	SEC Network	9,645	32–5	—
April 19	at No. 20 South Carolina	No. 2	Founders Park; Columbia, South Carolina	**W** 2–1	**Smith** (8–0)	Good (4–1)	**Hewlett** (4)	SECN+	8,242	33–5	13–3
April 20 (DH)	at No. 20 South Carolina	No. 2	Founders Park	**L** 3–6	Becker (5–2)	**Molina** (3–1)	McCreery (1)	SECN+	7,207	33–6	13–4
April 20 (DH)	at No. 20 South Carolina	No. 2	Founders Park	**W** 9–6	**Tygart** (4–1)	Eskew (2–3)		SECN+	6,719	34–6	14–4
April 23	vs. Arkansas–Pine Bluff	No. 2	Dickey–Stephens Park; North Little Rock, Arkansas	**W** 11–1 (7)	**Dossett** (3–0)	McLendon (1–7)		SECN+	9,293	35–6	—
April 26	Florida	No. 2	Baum–Walker Stadium	**W** 2–1	**Gaeckle** (3–2)	McNeillie (3–6)		SEC Network	10,551	36–6	15–4
April 27 (DH)	Florida	No. 2	Baum–Walker Stadium	**W** 6–5	**McEntire** (3–0)	Slater (3–2)	**Foutch** (1)	ESPN2	11,160	37–6	16–4
April 27 (DH)	Florida	No. 2	Baum–Walker Stadium	**L** 5–9	Clemente (2–0)	**Bybee** (2–1)		SECN+	11,160	37–7	16–5
April 30	Missouri State	No. 2	Baum–Walker Stadium	**W** 12–7	**Wood** (3–1)	Beaver (2–3)		SECN+	9,890	38–7	—

May (5–5)
Date	Opponent	Rank	Site/stadium	Score	Win	Loss	Save	TV	Attendance	Overall record	SEC record
May 1	Missouri State	No. 2	Baum–Walker Stadium	**W** 8–5	**Carter** (1–0)	Metz (1–3)	**Foutch** (4)	SECN+	9,815	39–7	—
May 3	at No. 8 Kentucky	No. 2	Kentucky Proud Park; Lexington, Kentucky	**W** 10–3	**Smith** (9–0)	Pooser (3–1)		SECN+	4,742	40–7	17–5
May 4	at No. 8 Kentucky	No. 2	Kentucky Proud Park	**L** 3–11	Niman (8–3)	**Tygart** (4–2)		SECN+	4,015	40–8	17–6
May 5	at No. 8 Kentucky	No. 2	Kentucky Proud Park	**L** 4–7	Moore (8–1)	**Molina** (3–2)	Hummel (6)	SECN+	6,024	40–9	17–7
May 10	No. 14 Mississippi State	No. 5	Baum–Walker Stadium	**W** 7–5	**McEntire** (4–0)	Hardin (3–1)	**Wood** (2)	SECN+	10,891	41–9	18–7
May 11	No. 14 Mississippi State	No. 5	Baum–Walker Stadium	**L** 5–8	Schuelke (3–2)	**Tygart** (4–3)	Davis (3)	SECN+	10,963	41–10	18–8
May 12	No. 14 Mississippi State	No. 5	Baum–Walker Stadium	**W** 9–6	**McEntire** (5–0)	Schuelke (3–3)	**Gaeckle** (7)	SEC Network	10,410	42–10	19–8
May 16	at No. 5 Texas A&M	No. 3	Olsen Field at Blue Bell Park; College Station, Texas	**L** 0–1 (11)	Aschenbeck (5–1)	**Faherty** (0–1)		ESPN2	6,976	42–11	19–9
May 17	at No. 5 Texas A&M	No. 3	Olsen Field at Blue Bell Park	**W** 6–3	**Molina** (4–2)	Stewart (1–2)		SEC Network	7,980	43–11	20–9
May 18	at No. 5 Texas A&M	No. 3	Olsen Field at Blue Bell Park	**L** 4–14 (7)	Cortez (8–1)	**Dossett** (3–1)		SEC Network	7,337	43–12	20–10

Postseason

SEC Tournament (0–2)
Date	Opponent	Rank	Site/stadium	Score	Win	Loss	Save	TV	Attendance	Overall record	SECT record
May 22	(10) South Carolina	No. 5 (2)	Hoover Metropolitan Stadium; Hoover, Alabama	**L** 5–6	Gainey (1–3)	**Gaeckle** (3–3)		SEC Network	7,185	43–13	0–1
May 23	No. 2 (3) Kentucky	No. 5 (2)	Hoover Metropolitan Stadium	**L** 6–9	Pooser (5–1)	**Smith** (9–1)		SEC Network	DH	43–14	0–2

NCAA Fayetteville Regional (1–2)
Date	Opponent	Rank	Site/stadium	Score	Win	Loss	Save	TV	Attendance	Overall record	NCAAT record
May 31	(4) Southeast Missouri State	No. 5 (1)	Baum–Walker Stadium	**W** 17–9	**Foutch** (1–0)	Wilma (2–5)		ESPN+	11,062	44–14	1–0
June 1	(3) Kansas State	No. 5 (1)	Baum–Walker Stadium	**L** 6–7	Wentworth (6–5)	**Smith** (9–2)	Neighbors (9)	ESPNU	11,213	44–15	1–1
June 2	(4) Southeast Missouri State	No. 5 (1)	Baum–Walker Stadium	**L** 3–6	Katen (2–0)	**Wood** (3–2)	Miller (8)	ESPN+	10,788	44–16	1–2

Schedule and results source • Rankings based on the teams' current ranking in the D1Baseball poll
**W** Arkansas win • **L** Arkansas loss • Postponement or cancellation • **Bold** denotes Arkansas player

== Record vs. conference opponents ==
Last two did not qualify for conf. tourn. Blank are not scheduled. Blue are home games, otherwise away.

2024 SEC baseball records Source: 2024 SEC baseball game results, 2024 SEC baseball schedule
Team	W–L	ALA	ARK	AUB	FLA	UGA	KEN	LSU	MSU	MIZZ	MISS	SCAR	TENN	TAMU	VAN	Team	Div	SR	SW
ALA	13–17		2–1	1–2	.	0–3	0–3	2–1	1–2	.	2–1	2–1	2–1	1–2	.	ALA	W4	5–5	0–2
ARK	20–10	1–2		2–1	2–1	.	1–2	3–0	2–1	3–0	3–0	2–1	.	1–2	.	ARK	W1	7–3	3–0
AUB	8–22	2–1	1–2		.	.	0–3	1–2	0–3	2–1	1–2	.	1–2	0–3	0–3	AUB	W7	2–8	0–4
FLA	13–17	.	1–2	.		2–1	1–2	2–1	2–1	0–3	.	1–2	1–2	2–1	1–2	FLA	E5	4–6	0–1
UGA	17–13	3–0	.	.	1–2		0–3	.	1–2	2–1	2–1	3–0	1–2	1–2	3–0	UGA	E3	5–5	3–1
KEN	22–8	3–0	2–1	3–0	2–1	3–0		.	.	2–1	3–0	1–2	1–2	.	2–1	KEN	E2	8–2	4–0
LSU	13–17	1–2	0–3	2–1	1–2	.	.		1–2	2–1	3–0	.	0–3	2–1	1–2	LSU	W5	4–6	1–2
MSU	17–13	2–1	1–2	3–0	1–2	2–1	.	2–1		2–1	1–2	.		1–2	2–1	MSU	W3	6–4	1–0
MIZZ	9–21	.	0–3	1–2	3–0	1–2	1–2	1–2	1–2		.	1–2	0–3	.	0–3	MIZZ	E7	1–9	1–3
MISS	11–19	1–2	0–3	2–1	.	1–2	0–3	0–3	2–1	.		2–1	1–2	2–1	.	MISS	W6	4–6	0–3
SCAR	13–17	1–2	1–2	.	2–1	0–3	2–1	.	.	2–1	1–2		0–3	1–2	3–0	SCAR	E6	4–6	1–2
TENN	22–8	1–2	.	2–1	2–1	2–1	2–1	3–0	.	3–0	2–1	3–0		.	2–1	TENN	E1	9–1	3–0
TAMU	19–11	2–1	2–1	3–0	1–2	2–1	.	1–2	2–1	.	1–2	2–1	.		3–0	TAMU	W2	7–3	2–0
VAN	13–17	.	.	3–0	2–1	0–3	1–2	2–1	1–2	3–0	.	0–3	1–2	0–3		VAN	E4	4–6	2–3
Team	W–L	ALA	ARK	AUB	FLA	UGA	KEN	LSU	MSU	MIZZ	MISS	SCAR	TENN	TAMU	VAN	Team	Div	SR	SW

Updated for entire regular season. Tie Brkrs: TENN>KEN head to head. MSU>UGA head to head. ALA>VAN & FLA>SCAR & LSU TENN common. VAN>FLA head to head. SCAR>LSU ARK common. ARK SEC Tournament seed>KEN, ARK West champion.

== Rankings ==
Ranking movements Legend: ██ Increase in ranking ██ Decrease in ranking
	Week																		
Poll	Pre	1	2	3	4	5	6	7	8	9	10	11	12	13	14	15	16	17	Final
Coaches'	4	4*	5	3	1	1	1	1	1	2	2	2	3	2	4	4			
Baseball America	3	3	3	3	1	1	1	1	1	2	2	2	3	3	5	5			
NCBWA†	4	5	5	4	2	1	1	1	1	3	2	2	4	2	5	5			
D1Baseball	3	2	2	2	1	1	1	1	1	2	2	2	5	3	5	5			
Perfect Game	2	2	2	2	1	1	1	1	1	2	2	2	5	3	7				

† NCBWA ranks 30 teams in their preseason poll, but only ranks 25 teams weekly during the season.
* A new poll was not released for this week, so for comparison purposes, the previous week's ranking is inserted in this week's slot.

== See also ==
- 2024 Arkansas Razorbacks softball team
