= 2024 Georgia Bulldogs baseball team =

2024 season of University of Georgia baseball team

2024 Georgia Bulldogs baseball

Athens Regional champions

Athens Super Regional, 1–2
- Conference: Southeastern Conference
- Eastern Division

Ranking
- Coaches: No. 10
- D1Baseball.com: No. 11
- Record: 43–17 (17–13 SEC)
- Head coach: Wes Johnson (1st season)
- Assistant coaches: Will Coggin; Josh Simpson; Brock Bennett
- Home stadium: Foley Field

2024 Southeastern Conference baseball standings
	Conf.				Overall
Team	W		L	PCT	W		L	PCT
Eastern
No. 1 Tennessee ^{x}‍†‍‡‍^{y}	22	–	8	.733	60	–	13	.822
No. 3 Kentucky ^{x}‍†‍‍^{y}	22	–	8	.733	46	–	16	.742
No. 11 Georgia ‍‍‍^{y}	17	–	13	.567	43	–	17	.717
Vanderbilt ‍‍‍^{y}	13	–	17	.433	38	–	23	.623
No. 8 Florida ‍‍‍^{y}	13	–	17	.433	36	–	30	.545
South Carolina ‍‍‍^{y}	13	–	17	.433	37	–	25	.597
Missouri ‍‍‍	9	–	21	.300	23	–	32	.418
Western
No. 17 Arkansas ^{x}‍‍‍^{y}	20	–	10	.667	44	–	16	.733
No. 2 Texas A&M ‍‍‍^{y}	19	–	11	.633	53	–	15	.779
No. 22 Mississippi State ‍‍‍^{y}	17	–	13	.567	40	–	23	.635
Alabama ‍‍‍^{y}	13	–	17	.433	33	–	24	.579
LSU ‍‍‍^{y}	13	–	17	.433	43	–	23	.652
Ole Miss ‍‍‍	11	–	19	.367	27	–	29	.482
Auburn ‍‍‍	8	–	22	.267	27	–	26	.509
x – Division champion † – Conference champion ‡ – Tournament champion y – Invited to the NCAA Tournament; As of June 24, 2024; Rankings from D1Baseball

The 2024 Georgia Bulldogs baseball team represented the University of Georgia in the 2024 NCAA Division I baseball season. The Bulldogs played their home games for the 68th season at Foley Field as a member of the Southeastern Conference. They were led by head coach Wes Johnson, in his first year as head coach.

== Previous season ==
The Bulldogs finished 29–27, 11–19 in the SEC to finish in sixth place in the East division. They were not invited to the postseason. As a result, head coach Scott Stricklin was fired.

== Personnel ==
=== Roster ===
2024 Georgia Bulldogs roster
Pitchers: 3 - Zach Harris - Sophomore; 4 - Jarvis Evans - Sophomore; 12 - Leighton Finley - Sophomore; 15 - Matthew Hoskins - Sophomore; 16 - Kolten Smith - Sophomore; 18 - James Hays - Freshman; 19 - Ethan Sutton - Freshman; 20 - Blake Gillespie - Sophomore; 21 - Coleman Willis - (redshirt) Sophomore; 26 - Brian Zeldin - Graduate; 29 - Charlie Goldstein - Graduate; 30 - Brandt Pancer - Senior; 31 - Chandler Marsh - Junior; 32 - Josh Roberge - Graduate; 33 - Max DeJong - Junior; 34 - Tyler McLoughlin - Senior; 35 - Paul Farley - Freshman; 38 - DJ Radtke - (redshirt) Sophomore; 39 - Wyatt Land - Freshman; 42 - Daniel Padysak - Graduate; 43 - Luke Wiltrakis - Freshman; 45 - Christian Mracna - Graduate; 46 - Zach DeVito - Senior; 47 - Collin Caldwell - Senior; 48 - Ryker Chavis - Freshman; 55 - Ryan Gold - Freshman	Catchers: 11 - Henry Hunter - Junior; 13 - Fernando Gonzalez - Senior; 50 - Josh Katz - Junior; Infielders: 2 - Sebastian Murillo - Senior; 9 - Kolby Branch - Sophomore; 14 - Trey King - Freshman; 23 - Paul Toetz - Graduate; 36 - Tre Phelps - Freshman; 44 - Slate Alford - Junior	Outfielders: 0 - Josh Stinson - (redshirt) Senior; 1 - Dillon Carter - Graduate; 8 - Clayton Chadwick - Graduate; 10 - John Marant - (redshirt) Junior; 25 - Dylan Goldstein - Graduate; 40 - Cooper Milford - Freshman; Utility: 6 - Corey Collins (OF/C) - Senior; 17 - Logan Jordan (OF/C) - Graduate; 24 - Charlie Condon (1B/OF) - (redshirt) Sophomore; 27 - Lukas Farris (OF/1B) - Sophomore

=== Coaching staff ===
2024 Georgia Bulldogs coaching staff
Name	Position	Seasons at Georgia	Alma mater
Wes Johnson	Head coach	1	Arkansas–Monticello (1994)
Will Coggin	Assistant coach	1	Mississippi State (2008)
Josh Simpson	Assistant coach	1	Northwestern Oklahoma State (2003)
Brock Bennett	Assistant coach	1	Alabama (2011)

== Schedule and results ==
2024 Georgia Bulldogs baseball game log
Regular season

February (8–1)
Date	Opponent	Rank	Site/Stadium	Score	Win	Loss	Save	TV	Attendance	Overall record	SEC Record
February 16	UNC Asheville		Foley Field; Athens, GA	**W** 11–2	**Goldstein (1–0)**	Johnson (0–1)	None	SECN+	2,504	1–0	–
February 17	UNC Asheville		Foley Field	**W** 17–5^{8}	**Mracna (1–0)**	Honeycutt (0–1)	None	SECN+	2,790	2–0	–
February 18	UNC Asheville		Foley Field	**W** 10–0^{7}	**Finley (1–0)**	Edmondson (0–1)	**Roberge (1)**	SECN+	1,787	3–0	–
February 20	at Georgia State		GSU Baseball Complex; Decatur, GA	**W** 15–0	**Evans (1–0)**	Butler (0–1)	None	None	475	4–0	–
February 23	Northern Kentucky		Foley Field	**W** 15–5^{7}	**Goldstein (2–0)**	Gillis (0–1)	None	SECN+	1,522	5–0	–
February 24	Northern Kentucky		Foley Field	**W** 7–6	**Smith (1–0)**	Johnson (0–1)	None	SECN+	2,866	6–0	–
February 25	Northern Kentucky		Foley Field	**W** 12–11	**Zeldin (1–0)**	Massie (0–1)	None	SECN+	1,505	7–0	–
February 27	Presbyterian		Foley Field	**W** 4–3	**Harris (1–0)**	Chamberlin (0–1)	**Zeldin (1)**	SECN+	747	8–0	–
February 28	Michigan State		Foley Field	**L** 6–19^{7}	Pikur (1–0)	**Sutton** (0–1)	None	SECN+	1,054	8–1	–

March (14–5)
Date	Opponent	Rank	Site/Stadium	Score	Win	Loss	Save	TV	Attendance	Overall record	SEC Record
March 1	at Georgia Tech		Russ Chandler Stadium; Atlanta, GA	Canceled (rain)							
March 2	Georgia Tech		Foley Field	**W** 3–1	**Roberge (1–0)**	McKee (0–1)	**Zeldin (2)**	SECN+	3,638	9–1	–
March 3	vs. Georgia Tech		Coolray Field; Lawrenceville, GA	**W** 11–9	**Roberge (2–0)**	Jones (1–1)	**Zeldin (3)**	None	8,163	10–1	–
March 5	vs. Georgia Southern		SRP Park; North Augusta, SC	**W** 7–2	**DeVito (1–0)**	Smith (1–2)	None	None	5,685	11–1	–
March 6	Stetson		Foley Field	**W** 11–5	**Harris (2–0)**	Shine (0–1)	None	SECN+	802	12–1	–
March 8	Northern Colorado		Foley Field	**W** 11–1^{7}	**Goldstein (3–0)**	Smith (0–4)	None	SECN+	778	13–1	–
March 9 (DH 1)	Northern Colorado		Foley Field	**W** 19–1^{7}	**Finley (2–0)**	Sharp (0–2)	None	SECN+	1,602	14–1	–
March 9 (DH 2)	Northern Colorado		Foley Field	**W** 14–6	**Padysak (1–0)**	Storey (0–2)	None	SECN+	1,602	15–1	–
March 10	Northern Colorado		Foley Field	**W** 11–1^{7}	**Evans (2–0)**	Moser (0–3)	None	SECN+	2,143	16–1	–
March 12	Iowa		Foley Field	**W** 10–5	**Mracna (2–0)**	Cadieux-Lanque (3–1)	None	SECN+	2,958	17–1	–
March 15	at Kentucky		Kentucky Proud Park; Lexington, KY	**L** 10–16	Byers (2–0)	**Smith (1–1)**	None	SECN+	2,040	17–2	0–1
March 16	at Kentucky		Kentucky Proud Park	**L** 3–9	Niman (4–1)	**Finley (2–1)**	Nove (2)	SECN+	2,893	17–3	0–2
March 17	at Kentucky		Kentucky Proud Park	**L** 2–12^{7}	Moore (4–0)	**Mracna (2–1)**	None	SECN+	2,899	17–4	0–3
March 19	Wofford		Foley Field	**W** 18–6^{7}	**DeVito (2–0)**	Bouchard (0–2)	None	SECN+	1,153	18–4	–
March 23 (DH 1)	No. 11 Alabama		Foley Field	**W** 9–5	**Zeldin (2–0)**	Moza (2–1)	None	SECN	3,920	19–4	1–3
March 23 (DH 2)	No. 11 Alabama		Foley Field	**W** 6–5	**Smith (2–1)**	Davis II (1–1)	None	SECN+	3,604	20–4	2–3
March 24	No. 11 Alabama		Foley Field	**W** 10–5	**Mracna (3–1)**	Banks (0–1)	**Zeldin (4)**	SECN+	3,724	21–4	3–3
March 26	Mercer		Foley Field	Canceled (rain)							
March 29	at No. 5 Tennessee		Lindsey Nelson Stadium; Knoxville, TN	**W** 16–2^{7}	**Goldstein (4–0)**	Causey (5–1)	None	SECN+	5,575	22–4	4–3
March 30	at No. 5 Tennessee		Lindsey Nelson Stadium	**L** 11–16	Connell (3–0)	**Smith** (2–2)	None	SECN	5,677	22–5	4–4
March 31	at No. 5 Tennessee		Lindsey Nelson Stadium	**L** 0–7	Sechrist (1–0)	**Mracna** (3–2)	Snead (2)	SECN	5,006	22–6	4–5

April (10–6)
Date	Opponent	Rank	Site/Stadium	Score	Win	Loss	Save	TV	Attendance	Overall record	SEC Record
April 2	Georgia State		Foley Field	**W** 10–1	**Smith** (3–2)	Lutz (0–1)	None	SECN+	2,923	23–6	–
April 5	at No. 23 Mississippi State		Dudy Noble Field; Starkville, MS	**L** 1–6	Stephen (4–2)	**Evans** (2–1)	Schuelke (2)	SECN+	12,315	23–7	4–6
April 6	at No. 23 Mississippi State		Dudy Noble Field	**W** 3–2	**Zeldin** (3–0)	Schuelke (1–2)	None	SECN	13,477	24–7	5–6
April 7	at No. 23 Mississippi State		Dudy Noble Field	**L** 8–9	Davis (3–0)	**Roberge** (2–1)	None	SECN+	11,337	24–8	5–7
April 9	Kennesaw State		Foley Field	**W** 15–5^{8}	**Harris** (3–0)	Eidson (0–2)	None	SECN+	1,489	25–8	–
April 11	Missouri		Foley Field	**W** 15–10	**Evans** (3–1)	Rustad (4–5)	None	SECN	3,171	26–8	6–7
April 12	Missouri		Foley Field	**L** 5–6^{10}	Magdic (1–1)	**Zeldin** (3–1)	None	SECN+	3,760	26–9	6–8
April 13	Missouri		Foley Field	**W** 10–7	**Smith** (4–2)	Pimental (1–2)	None	SECN+	3,521	27–9	7–8
April 19	Ole Miss	No. 24	Foley Field	**W** 17–6^{8}	**Finley** (3–1)	Maddox (2–5)	**Zeldin (5)**	SECN+	3,708	28–9	8–8
April 20 (DH 1)	Ole Miss	No. 24	Foley Field	**W** 7–2	**Smith** (5–2)	Mallitz (0–1)	None	SECN+	3,849	29–9	9–8
April 20 (DH 2)	Ole Miss	No. 24	Foley Field	**L** 2–3	Quinn (1–1)	**Wiltrakis** (0–1)	Jones (1)	SECN+	3,066	29–10	9–9
April 23	No. 5 Clemson	No. 20	Foley Field	**W** 4–3^{15}	**Marsh** (1–0)	Fitzgerald (0–1)	None	ESPNU	4,183	30–10	–
April 26	at No. 1 Texas A&M	No. 20	Blue Bell Park; College Station, TX	**L** 2–5	Prager (8–0)	**Goldstein** (4–1)	Aschenbeck (7)	SECN+	7,968	30–11	9–10
April 27 (DH 1)	at No. 1 Texas A&M	No. 20	Blue Bell Park	**L** 9–19	Sdao (3–0)	**Zeldin** (3–2)	None	SECN+	7,770	30–12	9–11
April 27 (DH 2)	at No. 1 Texas A&M	No. 20	Blue Bell Park	**W** 5–4	**Smith** (6–2)	Cortez (6–2)	**Mracna (1)**	SECN+	7,021	31–12	10–11
April 30	at Kennesaw State	No. 19	Fred Stillwell Stadium; Kennesaw, GA	**W** 9–3	**Harris** (4–0)	Pinson (2–7)	None	SECN+	1,322	32–12	–

May (7–2)
Date	Opponent	Rank	Site/Stadium	Score	Win	Loss	Save	TV	Attendance	Overall record	SEC Record
May 3	No. 17 Vanderbilt	No. 19	Foley Field	**W** 10–0^{7}	**Finley** (4–1)	Cunningham (6–3)	None	SECN+	4,027	33–12	11–11
May 4	No. 17 Vanderbilt	No. 19	Foley Field	**W** 14–4^{8}	**Smith** (7–2)	Holton (6–3)	None	SECN+	3,738	34–12	12–11
May 5	No. 17 Vanderbilt	No. 19	Foley Field	**W** 11–7	**Harris** (5–0)	Thompson (3–1)	**Marsh (1)**	SECN+	3,333	35–12	13–11
May 9	at No. 13 South Carolina	No. 15	Founders Park; Columbia, SC	**W** 14–10	**Smith** (8–2)	Kimball (2–2)	None	ESPN2	7,033	36–12	14–11
May 10	at No. 13 South Carolina	No. 15	Founders Park	**W** 11–5	**Finley** (5–1)	Jones (3–4)	**Zeldin (6)**	SECN	7,630	37–12	15–11
May 11	at No. 13 South Carolina	No. 15	Founders Park	**W** 14–6	**Roberge** (3–1)	Eskew (3–4)	None	SECN+	7,912	38–12	16–11
May 16	Florida	No. 9	Foley Field	**W** 9–4	**Smith** (9–2)	Coppola (3–4)	None	SECN+	3,900	39–12	17–11
May 17	Florida	No. 9	Foley Field	**L** 4–7^{10}	Neely (2–4)	**Zeldin** (3–3)	None	SECN+	3,483	39–13	17–12
May 18	Florida	No. 9	Foley Field	**L** 11–19	Jameson (4–0)	**Harris** (5–1)	None	SECN+	3,954	39–14	17–13

Post-season

SEC Tournament (0–1)
Date	Opponent	Seed	Site/stadium	Score	Win	Loss	Save	TV	Attendance	Overall record	SECT Record
May 21	vs. (11) LSU	(6) No. 11	Hoover Metropolitan Stadium; Hoover, AL	**L** 1–9	Jump (6–1)	**Evans** (3–2)	None	SECN	7,425	39–15	0–1

NCAA tournament: Athens Regional (3–0)
Date	Opponent	Seed	Site/stadium	Score	Win	Loss	Save	TV	Attendance	Overall record	Regional record
May 31	(4) Army	(1) No. 10	Foley Field	**W** 8–7	**Mracna (4–2)**	Berg (5–3)	None	ESPN+	3,795	40–15	1–0
June 1	(2) UNC Wilmington	(1)No. 10	Foley Field	**W** 11–2	**Radtke (1–0)**	Shafer (4–6)	None	ESPN+	3,687	41–15	2–0
June 2	(3) Georgia Tech	(1) No. 10	Foley Field	**W** 8–6^{10}	**Marsh (2–0)**	Stanford (2–1)	**Finley (1)**	ESPN+	3,745	42–15	3–0

NCAA tournament: Athens Super Regional (1–2)
Date	Opponent	Rank	Stadium Site	Score	Win	Loss	Save	TV	Attendance	Overall Record	Super Reg. Record
June 8	(10) No. 11 NC State	(7) No. 10	Foley Field	**L** 1–18	Highfill (7–2)	**Smith (9–3)**	Shaffner (1)	ESPNU	3,829	42–16	0–1
June 9	(10) No. 11 NC State	(7) No. 10	Foley Field	**W** 11–2	**Finley (6–1)**	Fritton (3–6)	None	ESPN2	3,893	43–16	1–1
June 10	(10) No. 11 NC State	(7) No. 10	Foley Field	**L** 5–8	Dudan (4–2)	**Harris (5–2)**	Smith (8)	ESPN	3,944	43–17	1–2

Legend: = Win = Loss = Canceled
Bold = Georgia team member
Rankings are based on the team's current ranking in the D1Baseball poll.

=== Athens Regional ===
Athens Regional Teams
(1) Georgia Bulldogs	(2) UNC Wilmington Seahawks	(3) Georgia Tech Yellow Jackets	(4) Army Black Knights

First Round
1	**Georgia**	8
4	Army	7
3	Georgia Tech	0
2	**UNC Wilmington**	9
Lower round 1
4	Army	2
3	**Georgia Tech**	4

Semi-Finals
1	**Georgia**	11
2	UNC Wilmington	2
Lower final
2	UNC Wilmington	1
3	**Georgia Tech**	3

Finals
1	**Georgia**	8	–
3	Georgia Tech	6	–

Athens Regional Round 1
(4) Army Black Knights	vs.	(1) Georgia Bulldogs

May 31, 2024, 12:00 pm (EST) at Foley Field in Athens, Georgia
Team	1	2	3	4	5	6	7	8	9	R	H	E
(4) Army	2	0	2	0	0	1	0	2	0	**7**	**10**	**1**
**(1) Georgia**	1	0	2	0	1	3	0	1	X	**8**	**12**	**2**
WP: Christian Mracna (4–2) LP: Andrew Berg (5–3); Home runs: ARMY: Chris Barr (2); Coleson Titus (2); UGA: Charlie Condon (36); Attendance: 3,795

Athens Regional Round 2
(2) UNC Wilmington Seahawks	vs.	(1) Georgia Bulldogs

June 1, 2024, 6:00 pm (EST) at Foley Field in Athens, Georgia
Team	1	2	3	4	5	6	7	8	9	R	H	E
(2) UNC Wilmington	0	1	0	0	1	0	0	0	0	**2**	**8**	**1**
**(1) Georgia**	1	4	0	1	2	0	1	2	X	**11**	**9**	**0**
WP: DJ Radtke (1–0) LP: Jacob Shafer (4–6); Home runs: UNCW: Trevor Marsh (15); UGA: Kolby Branch (16); Corey Collins (19); Attendance: 3,687

Athens Regional Championship
(1) Georgia Bulldogs	vs.	(3) Georgia Tech Yellow Jackets

June 2, 2024, 6:00 pm (EST) at Foley Field in Athens, Georgia
Team	1	2	3	4	5	6	7	8	9	10	R	H	E
**(1) Georgia**	2	0	0	0	1	0	0	1	1	3	**8**	**10**	**1**
(3) Georgia Tech	1	4	0	0	0	0	0	0	0	1	**6**	**10**	**1**
WP: Chandler Marsh (2–0) LP: Riley Stanford (2–1) Sv: Leighton Finley (1); Home runs: UGA: Kolby Branch (17); Tre Phelps (10); GT: Vahn Lackey (4); Attendance: 3,745

=== Athens Super Regional ===
Athens Super Regional Game 1
(10) NC State Wolfpack	vs.	(7) Georgia Bulldogs

June 8, 2024, 12:00 pm (EST) at Foley Field in Athens, Georgia
Team	1	2	3	4	5	6	7	8	9	R	H	E
**(10) NC State**	0	11	1	0	1	1	2	0	2	**18**	**20**	**0**
(7) Georgia	0	0	0	0	1	0	0	0	0	**1**	**4**	**2**
WP: Sam Highfill (7–2) LP: Kolten Smith (9–3) Sv: Andrew Shaffner (1); Home runs: NCST: Jacob Cozart (17, 18); Alec Makarewicz (21); Garrett Pennington (17); Eli Serrano III (8); UGA: None; Attendance: 3,829

Athens Super Regional Game 2
(7) Georgia Bulldogs	vs.	(10) NC State Wolfpack

June 9, 2024, 12:00 pm (EST) at Foley Field in Athens, Georgia
Team	1	2	3	4	5	6	7	8	9	R	H	E
**(7) Georgia**	2	0	3	3	0	1	1	1	0	**11**	**15**	**2**
(10) NC State	0	0	0	0	0	0	1	1	0	**2**	**9**	**0**
WP: Leighton Finley (6–1) LP: Dominic Fritton (3–6); Home runs: UGA: Slate Alford (17); Corey Collins (20); Tre Phelps (11); Paul Toetz (5); NCST: Jacob Cozart (19); Attendance: 3,893

Athens Super Regional Championship
(10) NC State Wolfpack	vs.	(7) Georgia Bulldogs

June 10, 2024, 7:00 pm (EST) at Foley Field in Athens, Georgia
Team	1	2	3	4	5	6	7	8	9	R	H	E
**(10) NC State**	0	0	2	2	0	1	1	2	0	**8**	**15**	**0**
(7) Georgia	0	2	0	0	0	1	1	0	1	**5**	**7**	**0**
WP: Jacob Dudan (4–2) LP: Zach Harris (5–2) Sv: Derrick Smith (8); Home runs: NCST: Alec Makarewicz (22); Garrett Pennington (18); Eli Serrano III (9); Alex Sosa (6); UGA: Charlie Condon (37); Tre Phelps (12); Attendance: 3,944

== Record vs. conference opponents ==
Last two did not qualify for conf. tourn. Blank are not scheduled. Blue are home games, otherwise away.

2024 SEC baseball records Source: 2024 SEC baseball game results, 2024 SEC baseball schedule
Team	W–L	ALA	ARK	AUB	FLA	UGA	KEN	LSU	MSU	MIZZ	MISS	SCAR	TENN	TAMU	VAN	Team	Div	SR	SW
ALA	13–17		2–1	1–2	.	0–3	0–3	2–1	1–2	.	2–1	2–1	2–1	1–2	.	ALA	W4	5–5	0–2
ARK	20–10	1–2		2–1	2–1	.	1–2	3–0	2–1	3–0	3–0	2–1	.	1–2	.	ARK	W1	7–3	3–0
AUB	8–22	2–1	1–2		.	.	0–3	1–2	0–3	2–1	1–2	.	1–2	0–3	0–3	AUB	W7	2–8	0–4
FLA	13–17	.	1–2	.		2–1	1–2	2–1	2–1	0–3	.	1–2	1–2	2–1	1–2	FLA	E5	4–6	0–1
UGA	17–13	3–0	.	.	1–2		0–3	.	1–2	2–1	2–1	3–0	1–2	1–2	3–0	UGA	E3	5–5	3–1
KEN	22–8	3–0	2–1	3–0	2–1	3–0		.	.	2–1	3–0	1–2	1–2	.	2–1	KEN	E2	8–2	4–0
LSU	13–17	1–2	0–3	2–1	1–2	.	.		1–2	2–1	3–0	.	0–3	2–1	1–2	LSU	W5	4–6	1–2
MSU	17–13	2–1	1–2	3–0	1–2	2–1	.	2–1		2–1	1–2	.		1–2	2–1	MSU	W3	6–4	1–0
MIZZ	9–21	.	0–3	1–2	3–0	1–2	1–2	1–2	1–2		.	1–2	0–3	.	0–3	MIZZ	E7	1–9	1–3
MISS	11–19	1–2	0–3	2–1	.	1–2	0–3	0–3	2–1	.		2–1	1–2	2–1	.	MISS	W6	4–6	0–3
SCAR	13–17	1–2	1–2	.	2–1	0–3	2–1	.	.	2–1	1–2		0–3	1–2	3–0	SCAR	E6	4–6	1–2
TENN	22–8	1–2	.	2–1	2–1	2–1	2–1	3–0	.	3–0	2–1	3–0		.	2–1	TENN	E1	9–1	3–0
TAMU	19–11	2–1	2–1	3–0	1–2	2–1	.	1–2	2–1	.	1–2	2–1	.		3–0	TAMU	W2	7–3	2–0
VAN	13–17	.	.	3–0	2–1	0–3	1–2	2–1	1–2	3–0	.	0–3	1–2	0–3		VAN	E4	4–6	2–3
Team	W–L	ALA	ARK	AUB	FLA	UGA	KEN	LSU	MSU	MIZZ	MISS	SCAR	TENN	TAMU	VAN	Team	Div	SR	SW

Updated for entire regular season. Tie Brkrs: TENN>KEN head to head. MSU>UGA head to head. ALA>VAN & FLA>SCAR & LSU TENN common. VAN>FLA head to head. SCAR>LSU ARK common. ARK SEC Tournament seed>KEN, ARK West champion.
