= 2024 Florida Gators baseball team =

Season of University of Florida baseball team

2024 Florida Gators baseball

Stillwater Regional champions Clemson Super Regional champions

College World Series, 2–2
- Conference: Southeastern Conference
- Eastern Division

Ranking
- Coaches: No. 6
- D1Baseball.com: No. 8
- Record: 36–30 (13–17 SEC)
- Head coach: Kevin O'Sullivan (17th season)
- Assistant coaches: Chuck Jeroloman; Taylor Black; David Kopp
- Home stadium: Condron Ballpark

2024 Southeastern Conference baseball standings
	Conf.				Overall
Team	W		L	PCT	W		L	PCT
Eastern
No. 1 Tennessee ^{x}‍†‍‡‍^{y}	22	–	8	.733	60	–	13	.822
No. 3 Kentucky ^{x}‍†‍‍^{y}	22	–	8	.733	46	–	16	.742
No. 11 Georgia ‍‍‍^{y}	17	–	13	.567	43	–	17	.717
Vanderbilt ‍‍‍^{y}	13	–	17	.433	38	–	23	.623
No. 8 Florida ‍‍‍^{y}	13	–	17	.433	36	–	30	.545
South Carolina ‍‍‍^{y}	13	–	17	.433	37	–	25	.597
Missouri ‍‍‍	9	–	21	.300	23	–	32	.418
Western
No. 17 Arkansas ^{x}‍‍‍^{y}	20	–	10	.667	44	–	16	.733
No. 2 Texas A&M ‍‍‍^{y}	19	–	11	.633	53	–	15	.779
No. 22 Mississippi State ‍‍‍^{y}	17	–	13	.567	40	–	23	.635
Alabama ‍‍‍^{y}	13	–	17	.433	33	–	24	.579
LSU ‍‍‍^{y}	13	–	17	.433	43	–	23	.652
Ole Miss ‍‍‍	11	–	19	.367	27	–	29	.482
Auburn ‍‍‍	8	–	22	.267	27	–	26	.509
x – Division champion † – Conference champion ‡ – Tournament champion y – Invited to the NCAA Tournament; As of June 24, 2024; Rankings from D1Baseball

The 2024 Florida Gators baseball team represented the University of Florida in the sport of baseball during the 2024 college baseball season. Florida competed in the Eastern Division of the Southeastern Conference (SEC). Home games were played at Condron Ballpark on the university's Gainesville, Florida campus, in the fourth season at the ballpark. The team was coached by Kevin O'Sullivan in his seventeenth season as Florida's head coach. The Gators entered the season looking to return to the College World Series after finishing as the national runner-up to LSU in last year's NCAA tournament, as well as defend their 2023 SEC championship.

The Gators' turbulent regular season began with a season-opening loss to St. John's in a rain-curtailed series. This set the tone for the non-conference slate, as Florida went 8–6 in midweek games, including a sweep by Florida State in their annual rivalry series. The Gators opened conference play with three ranked series wins, including on the road in a national championship rematch against LSU, and against 2024 College World Series team Texas A&M. This start was derailed when the Gators were swept by last-place Missouri, with Missouri winning each game by a single run. They continued to add to their conference deficit by winning only one game in each of their next five series, including back-to-back-to-back series against top five teams in Arkansas, Tennessee, and Kentucky. However, Florida was able to log a final series win at No. 9 Georgia. This guaranteed they would meet the minimum eligibility criterion for a potential at-large bid to the 2024 NCAA Division I baseball tournament despite their first round loss to Vanderbilt in the conference tournament.

With a 28–27 record, the Gators were awarded the third seed in the Stillwater regional, where they overcame the losers' bracket to win over host Oklahoma State. This set up a Super Regional showdown against No. 6 national seed Clemson, and marked the first time head coach Kevin O'Sullivan would return to Clemson since he departed Jack Leggett's staff after the 2007 season when he was hired by Florida. Florida completed the sweep in what was billed as instant classic when Michael Robertson hit a walk-off, 2-RBI double in the 13th inning after 5 hours and 4 minutes, claiming Game 2 11–10, and sending the Gators to their fourteenth College World Series just a year after coming up short against LSU in the national championship series.

At the College World Series, a sluggish offensive performance in which the Gators struck out 16 times and went 1-for-11 with runners in scoring position resulted in a 3–2 loss to Texas A&M in the opening round. However, victories against NC State and Kentucky in the losers' bracket set up a rematch against Texas A&M in the semifinal. The season would ultimately come to an end here, where the Gators were again sluggish on offense, this time hitting 1-for-12 with runners in scoring position in a 6–0 shutout loss, falling short of returning to the CWS Championship Series.

== Preseason ==
=== Preseason SEC awards and honors ===
Infielders Cade Kurland and Colby Shelton, relief pitcher Brandon Neely, and two-way player Jac Caglianone were named to the All-SEC preseason first team. Caglianone was also named to the All-SEC preseason second team as a starting pitcher.

Preseason All-SEC First Team
Player	No.	Position	Class
Jac Caglianone	14	1B	Junior
Cade Kurland	4	2B	Sophomore
Brandon Neely	22	P	Junior
Colby Shelton	10	SS	Sophomore

Preseason All-SEC Second Team
Player	No.	Position	Class
Jac Caglianone	14	P	Junior

=== Coaches poll ===
The SEC baseball coaches' poll was released on February 8, 2024.

SEC East Coaches' Poll
Predicted finish	Team	Points
1	Florida	88 (11)
2	Tennessee	75 (2)
3	Vanderbilt	73 (1)
4	South Carolina	50
5	Kentucky	44
6	Georgia	36
7	Missouri	19

== Roster ==
2024 Florida Gators baseball team
Players
Coaches

#	Pos.	Name	B/T	Height	Weight	Year	Home town
1	INF	Dale Thomas	R/R	5 ft 10 in (1.78 m)	205 lb (93 kg)	Sr	De Leon Springs, FL
2	OF	Ty Evans	R/R	6 ft 2 in (1.88 m)	225 lb (102 kg)	Jr	Auburndale, FL
3	LHP	Cade Fisher	L/L	6 ft 4 in (1.93 m)	210 lb (95 kg)	So	Dalton, GA
4	INF	Cade Kurland	R/R	5 ft 11 in (1.8 m)	195 lb (88 kg)	So	Tampa, FL
5	INF	Summy Mummau	R/R	6 ft 0 in (1.83 m)	185 lb (84 kg)	Fr	Palm Harbor, FL
6	INF	Tyler Shelnut	R/R	6 ft 2 in (1.88 m)	200 lb (91 kg)	Sr	Lake City, FL
8	RHP	Christian Rodriguez	R/R	6 ft 0 in (1.83 m)	210 lb (95 kg)	Fr	Coral Springs, FL
9	RHP	Luke McNeillie	L/R	6 ft 3 in (1.91 m)	185 lb (84 kg)	Fr	Milton, GA
10	INF	Colby Shelton	L/R	6 ft 0 in (1.83 m)	200 lb (91 kg)	So	Lexington, SC
11	OF	Michael Robertson	L/R	6 ft 2 in (1.88 m)	195 lb (88 kg)	RS So	Venice, FL
12	RHP	Liam Peterson	R/R	6 ft 5 in (1.96 m)	205 lb (93 kg)	Fr	Palm Harbor, FL
13	RHP	Ryan Slater	R/R	6 ft 3 in (1.91 m)	205 lb (93 kg)	RS Jr	Palm Harbor, FL
14	LHP	Jac Caglianone	L/L	6 ft 5 in (1.96 m)	250 lb (113 kg)	Jr	Tampa, FL
15	INF	Landon Russell	R/R	6 ft 1 in (1.85 m)	190 lb (86 kg)	So	Phenix City, AL
16	OF	Hayden Yost	L/L	6 ft 1 in (1.85 m)	195 lb (88 kg)	Fr	Tampa, FL
17	LHP	Jacob Gomberg	L/L	5 ft 10 in (1.78 m)	175 lb (79 kg)	Fr	Coral Springs, FL
18	LHP	Pierce Coppola	L/L	6 ft 8 in (2.03 m)	255 lb (116 kg)	RS So	Verona, NJ
20	RHP	Jake Clemente	R/R	6 ft 3 in (1.91 m)	220 lb (100 kg)	RS Fr	Coral Springs, FL
21	RHP	Caden McDonald	R/R	6 ft 3 in (1.91 m)	205 lb (93 kg)	Fr	Tampa, FL
22	RHP	Brandon Neely	R/R	6 ft 3 in (1.91 m)	210 lb (95 kg)	Jr	Seville, FL
23	INF	John Martinez	R/R	5 ft 11 in (1.8 m)	190 lb (86 kg)	Fr	Orlando, FL
24	OF	Blake Brookins	L/R	6 ft 5 in (1.96 m)	215 lb (98 kg)	Fr	Palmetto Bay, FL
25	RHP	Reilly Witmer	R/R	6 ft 4 in (1.93 m)	220 lb (100 kg)	Fr	Naples, FL
26	C	Tanner Garrison	R/R	6 ft 3 in (1.91 m)	220 lb (100 kg)	Sr	Dallas, TX
27	RHP	Fisher Jameson	R/R	6 ft 5 in (1.96 m)	240 lb (109 kg)	Jr	Lake Worth, FL
28	C	Luke Heyman	R/R	6 ft 4 in (1.93 m)	220 lb (100 kg)	So	Longwood, FL
29	C	Brody Donay	R/R	6 ft 5 in (1.96 m)	235 lb (107 kg)	So	Lakeland, FL
30	OF	Ashton Wilson	R/R	6 ft 0 in (1.83 m)	195 lb (88 kg)	So	Orlando, FL
31	LHP	Frank Menendez	L/L	6 ft 1 in (1.85 m)	230 lb (104 kg)	Fr	Miami, FL
32	RHP	Grayson Smith	R/R	6 ft 2 in (1.88 m)	205 lb (93 kg)	Fr	Rocky Face, GA
33	LHP	Robert Satin	L/L	6 ft 3 in (1.91 m)	215 lb (98 kg)	Fr	Tampa, FL
34	RHP	Alex Philpott	R/R	6 ft 5 in (1.96 m)	175 lb (79 kg)	Fr	Tampa, FL
41	RHP	Blake Purnell	R/R	6 ft 3 in (1.91 m)	220 lb (100 kg)	RS Jr	Boynton Beach, FL
44	INF	Armando Albert	L/R	5 ft 11 in (1.8 m)	160 lb (73 kg)	Sr	Plantation, FL
48	RHP	Hunter Jones	R/R	6 ft 3 in (1.91 m)	170 lb (77 kg)	Fr	Anthony, FL
50	OF	Jaylen Guy	R/R	6 ft 0 in (1.83 m)	200 lb (91 kg)	Sr	Greensboro, NC

Head coach

7 Kevin O'Sullivan

Assistant coach(es)

Taylor Black
Chuck Jeroloman
David Kopp
Mike Rivera

Legend

- (C) Team captain
- (S) Suspended
- (I) Ineligible
- Injured
- Current redshirt

Roster
Last update: February 9, 2024

== Schedule ==
Legend
	Florida win
	Florida loss
	Postponement
**Bold**	Florida team member

2024 Florida Gators baseball game log
Regular season

February (6–2)
Date	Opponent	Rank	Stadium Site	Score	Win	Loss	Save	Attendance	Overall record	SEC record
February 16	St. John's	No. 2	Condron Ballpark; Gainesville, FL	**L** 5–9	X. Kolhosser (1–0)	**C. Fisher** (0–1)	S. Mettert (1)	7,898	0–1	–
February 17	St. John's	No. 2	Condron Ballpark	Canceled (rain)						
February 18	St. John's	No. 2	Condron Ballpark	Canceled (rain)						
February 20	at North Florida	No. 4	Harmon Stadium; Jacksonville, FL	**W** 10–0^{7}	**L. Peterson** (1–0)	T. Roca (0–1)	None	2,509	1–1	–
February 21	North Florida	No. 4	Condron Ballpark	**W** 13–4	**A. Philpott** (1–0)	A. Love (0–1)	None	5,057	2–1	–
February 23	Columbia	No. 4	Condron Ballpark	**W** 15–6	**C. Fisher** (1–1)	J. Sheets (0–1)	None	6,000	3–1	–
February 24	Columbia	No. 4	Condron Ballpark	**W** 7–3	**L. McNeillie** (1–0)	A. Leon (0–1)	None	8,437	4–1	–
February 25	Columbia	No. 4	Condron Ballpark	**W** 12–5	**A. Philpott** (2–0)	J. Ogden (0–1)	None	5,498	5–1	–
February 27	at Stetson	No. 4	Conrad Park; DeLand, FL	**L** 4–7	A. DeFabbia (2–0)	**L. McNeillie** (1–1)	C. Stallings (1)	2,986	5–2	–
February 28	Bethune–Cookman	No. 4	Condron Ballpark	**W** 9–2	**R. Satin** (1–0)	D. Dudones (1–1)	None	4,778	6–2	–

March (10–9)
Date	Opponent	Rank	Stadium Site	Score	Win	Loss	Save	Attendance	Overall record	SEC record
March 1	at Miami (FL); Rivalry	No. 4	Alex Rodriguez Park; Coral Gables, FL	**W** 7–3	**R. Slater** (1–0)	G. Ziehl (0–1)	None	3,555	7–2	–
March 2	at Miami (FL); Rivalry	No. 4	Alex Rodriguez Park	**L** 6–10	R. Schlesinger (2–0)	**L. Peterson** (1–1)	N. Robert (1)	3,555	7–3	–
March 3	at Miami (FL); Rivalry	No. 4	Alex Rodriguez Park	**W** 8–4	**J. Caglianone** (1–0)	H. Hernandez (2–1)	None	3,555	8–3	–
March 5	Florida Atlantic	No. 4	Condron Ballpark	Postponed (inclement weather) Makeup: April 30						
March 6	UCF	No. 4	Condron Ballpark	**L** 6–9	D. Castellano (2–0)	**L. McNeillie** (1–2)	K. Kramer (1)	5,330	8–4	–
March 8	St. Mary's	No. 4	Condron Ballpark	**W** 12–11^{10}	**F. Jameson** (1–0)	P. Howey (1–1)	None	5,229	9–4	–
March 9	St. Mary's	No. 4	Condron Ballpark	**L** 7–9	C. Linchey (1–2)	**L. McNeillie** (1–3)	None	6,215	9–5	–
March 10	St. Mary's	No. 4	Condron Ballpark	**W** 10–0^{8}	**J. Caglianone** (2–0)	J. Reitz (1–1)	None	5,275	10–5	–
March 12	Florida State; Rivalry	No. 8	Condron Ballpark	**L** 8–12	C. Dorsey (2–0)	**A. Philpott** (2–1)	None	8,142	10–6	–
March 15	No. 4 Texas A&M	No. 8	Condron Ballpark	**W** 8–6	**C. Fisher** (2–1)	C. Cortez (2–1)	**B. Neely** (1)	5,863	11–6	1–0
March 16	No. 4 Texas A&M	No. 8	Condron Ballpark	**L** 6–10	E. Aschenbeck (3–0)	**L. Peterson** (1–2)	S. Sdao (1)	6,541	11–7	1–1
March 17	No. 4 Texas A&M	No. 8	Condron Ballpark	**W** 4–2	**B. Neely** (1–0)	J. Stewart (1–1)	**L. McNeillie** (1)	6,110	12–7	2–1
March 19	Jacksonville	No. 6	Condron Ballpark	**L** 6–7	D. Faulkner (1–0)	**G. Smith** (0–1)	I. Williams (3)	5,165	12–8	–
March 22	at No. 5 LSU	No. 6	Alex Box Stadium; Baton Rouge, LA	**L** 1–6	L. Holman (5–1)	**C. Fisher** (2–2)	G. Herring (2)	12,539	12–9	2–2
March 23	at No. 5 LSU	No. 6	Alex Box Stadium	**W** 6–4^{11}	**R. Slater** (2–0)	N. Ackenhausen (2–2)	None	12,892	13–9	3–2
March 24	at No. 5 LSU	No. 6	Alex Box Stadium	**W** 12–2^{8}	**J. Caglianone** (3–0)	H. Thatcher (1–3)	None	11,648	14–9	4–2
March 26	vs. No. 17 Florida State; Rivalry	No. 6	121 Financial Park; Jacksonville, FL	**L** 3–14^{8}	J. Charles (1–0)	**A. Philpott** (2–2)	None	7,710	14–10	–
March 29	No. 21 Mississippi State	No. 6	Condron Ballpark	**W** 7–6	**L. McNeillie** (2–3)	N. Stevens (2–2)	None	7,167	15–10	5–2
March 30	No. 21 Mississippi State	No. 6	Condron Ballpark	**L** 2–12	J. Cijntje (5–1)	**L. Peterson** (1–3)	None	7,129	15–11	5–3
March 31	No. 21 Mississippi State	No. 6	Condron Ballpark	**W** 4–3	**L. McNeillie** (3–3)	E. Siary (0–2)	None	5,829	16–11	6–3

April (7–10)
Date	Opponent	Rank	Stadium Site	Score	Win	Loss	Save	Attendance	Overall record	SEC record
April 2	Florida A&M	No. 6	Condron Ballpark	**W** 10–7	**F. Jameson** (2–0)	C. Williams (2–1)	**C. Fisher** (1)	5,041	17–11	–
April 5	at Missouri	No. 6	Taylor Stadium; Columbia, MO	**L** 1–2^{11}	C. Rustad (4–4)	**L. McNeillie** (3–4)	None	1,749	17–12	6–4
April 6	at Missouri	No. 6	Taylor Stadium	**L** 3–4	B. Lucas (4–0)	**L. Peterson** (1–4)	R. Magdic (1)	2,209	17–13	6–5
April 7	at Missouri	No. 6	Taylor Stadium	**L** 10–11	J. Peaden (2–1)	**L. McNeillie** (3–5)	None	1,449	17–14	6–6
April 9	at No. 10 Florida State; Rivalry	No. 24	Dick Howser Stadium; Tallahassee, FL	**L** 4–19^{7}	A. Armstrong (4–0)	**R. Slater** (2–1)	None	6,700	17–15	–
April 12	South Carolina	No. 24	Condron Ballpark	**L** 3–10	E. Jones (3–1)	**B. Neely** (1–1)	C. Veach (2)	7,869	17–16	6–7
April 13	South Carolina	No. 24	Condron Ballpark	**L** 8–9	R. Kimball (2–1)	**P. Coppola** (0–1)	T. Pitzer (1)	8,109	17–17	6–8
April 14	South Carolina	No. 24	Condron Ballpark	**W** 11–9	**J. Caglianone** (4–0)	M. Becker (4–2)	None	5,772	18–17	7–8
April 16	Jacksonville		Condron Ballpark	**W** 12–1^{7}	**J. Clemente** (1–0)	D. Stone (0–1)	None	4,931	19–17	–
April 18	at No. 13 Vanderbilt		Hawkins Field; Nashville, TN	**L** 5–10	B. Cunningham (5–2)	**B. Neely** (1–2)	G. Carter (2)	3,802	19–18	7–9
April 19	at No. 13 Vanderbilt		Hawkins Field	**L** 2–5	C. Holton (6–1)	**P. Coppola** (0–2)	G. Carter (3)	3,802	19–19	7–10
April 20	at No. 13 Vanderbilt		Hawkins Field	**W** 6–2	**J. Caglianone** (5–0)	L. Guth (1–1)	**F. Jameson** (1)	3,802	20–19	8–10
April 23	Stetson		Condron Ballpark	**W** 13–3^{7}	**R. Slater** (3–1)	D. Garcia (0–2)	None	5,165	21–19	–
April 26	at No. 2 Arkansas		Baum–Walker Stadium; Fayetteville, AR	**L** 1–2	G. Gaeckle (3–2)	**L. McNeillie** (3–6)	None	10,551	21–20	8–11
April 27 (1)	at No. 2 Arkansas		Baum–Walker Stadium	**L** 5–6	W. McEntire (3–0)	**R. Slater** (3–2)	C. Foutch (1)	11,160	21–21	8–12
April 27 (2)^{[a]}	at No. 2 Arkansas		Baum–Walker Stadium	**W** 9–5	**J. Clemente** (2–0)	B. Bybee (2–1)	None	11,160	22–21	9–12
April 30	Florida Atlantic		Condron Ballpark	**W** 10–8	**R. Slater** (4–2)	D. Ball (0–3)	None	4,790	23–21	–
^{^[a]}Rescheduled from April 28 as a single-admission doubleheader due to the threat of inclement weather.

May (5–5)
Date	Opponent	Rank	Stadium Site	Score	Win	Loss	Save	Attendance	Overall record	SEC record
May 2	No. 3 Tennessee		Condron Ballpark	Postponed (inclement weather) Makeup: May 3 as a single-admission doubleheader						
May 3 (1)	No. 3 Tennessee		Condron Ballpark	**L** 2–6	A. Causey (8–3)	**B. Neely** (1–3)	K. Connell (4)	6,326	23–22	9–13
May 3 (2)	No. 3 Tennessee		Condron Ballpark	**W** 4–3	**F. Jameson** (3–0)	D. Beam (6–2)	**L. McNeillie** (2)	6,326	24–22	10–13
May 4	No. 3 Tennessee		Condron Ballpark	**L** 3–16^{7}	N. Snead (8–1)	**J. Caglianone** (5–1)	None	7,335	24–23	10–14
May 7	South Florida		Condron Ballpark	**W** 4–1	**C. Fisher** (3–2)	L. Gailey (2–2)	**B. Neely** (2)	4,924	25–23	–
May 10	No. 4 Kentucky		Condron Ballpark	**L** 11–12^{10}	J. Hummel (3–0)	**C. Fisher** (3–3)	R. Hagenow (2)	5,294	25–24	10–15
May 11	No. 4 Kentucky		Condron Ballpark	**W** 10–1	**L. Peterson** (2–4)	D. Niman (8–4)	**R. Slater** (1)	5,571	26–24	11–15
May 12	No. 4 Kentucky		Condron Ballpark	**L** 5–7^{10}	R. Hagenow (1–0)	**B. Neely** (1–4)	B. Cleaver (1)	6,083	26–25	11–16
May 16	at No. 9 Georgia		Foley Field; Athens, GA	**L** 4–9	K. Smith (9–2)	**P. Coppola** (0–3)	None	3,900	26–26	11–17
May 17	at No. 9 Georgia		Foley Field	**W** 7–4^{10}	**B. Neely** (2–4)	B. Zeldin (3–3)	None	3,483	27–26	12–17
May 18	at No. 9 Georgia		Foley Field	**W** 19–11	**F. Jameson** (4–0)	Z. Harris (5–1)	None	3,954	28–26	13–17

Postseason

SEC tournament (0–1)
Date	Opponent	Rank	Stadium Site	Score	Win	Loss	Save	Attendance	Overall Record	SECT Record
May 21	vs. (8) Vanderbilt; First round	(9)	Hoover Metropolitan Stadium; Hoover, AL	**L** 3–6	B. Cunningham (7–4)	**P. Coppola** (0–4)	B. Seiber (5)	9,240	28–27	0–1

NCAA tournament: Stillwater Regional (4–1)
Date	Opponent	Rank	Stadium Site	Score	Win	Loss	Save	Attendance	Overall Record	Regional Record
May 31	vs. (2) Nebraska; First round	(3)	O'Brate Stadium; Stillwater, OK	**W** 5–2	**L. Peterson** (3–4)	B. Sears (9–1)	**B. Neely** (3)	4,709	29–27	1–0
June 1	at No. 16 (1) Oklahoma State; Second round	(3)	O'Brate Stadium	**L** 1–7	B. Holiday (7–3)	**J. Caglianone** (5–2)	None	5,593	29–28	1–1
June 2 (1)	vs. (2) Nebraska; Second round elimination game	(3)	O'Brate Stadium	**W** 17–11	**R. Slater** (5–2)	J. Brockett (3–3)	None	4,645	30–28	2–1
June 2 (2)	at No. 16 (1) Oklahoma State; Regional final game 1	(3)	O'Brate Stadium	**W** 5–2	**B. Neely** (3–4)	C. Benge (3–2)	None	5,173	31–28	3–1
June 3	at No. 16 (1) Oklahoma State; Regional final game 2	(3)	O'Brate Stadium	**W** 4–2	**F. Menendez** (1–0)	T. Molsky (6–3)	**F. Jameson** (3)	4,811	32–28	4–1

NCAA tournament: Clemson Super Regional (2–0)
Date	Opponent	Rank	Stadium Site	Score	Win	Loss	Save	Attendance	Overall Record	Super Reg. Record
June 8	at No. 3 (6) Clemson		Doug Kingsmore Stadium; Clemson, SC	**W** 10–7	**F. Jameson** (5–0)	T. Smith (2–1)	**B. Neely** (4)	6,492	33–28	1–0
June 9	at No. 3 (6) Clemson		Doug Kingsmore Stadium	**W** 11–10^{13}	**L. McNeillie** (4–6)	E. Darden (5–5)	None	6,423	34–28	2–0

NCAA tournament: College World Series (2–2)
Date	Opponent	Rank	Stadium Site	Score	Win	Loss	Save	Attendance	Overall Record	CWS Record
June 15	vs. No. 4 (3) Texas A&M; First round		Charles Schwab Field; Omaha, NE	**L** 2–3	C. Cortez (10–3)	**L. Peterson** (3–5)	E. Aschenbeck (10)	25,774	34–29	0–1
June 17	vs. No. 11 (10) NC State; First round elimination game		Charles Schwab Field	**W** 5–4	**C. Fisher** (4–3)	D. Fritton (3–7)	**B. Neely** (5)	23,578	35–29	1–1
June 18	vs. No. 2 (2) Kentucky; Second round elimination game		Charles Schwab Field	Postponed (inclement weather) Makeup: June 19						
June 19 (1)	vs. No. 2 (2) Kentucky; Second round elimination game		Charles Schwab Field	**W** 15–4	**P. Coppola** (1–4)	D. Niman (8–5)	None	23,687	36–29	2–1
June 19 (2)	vs. No. 4 (3) Texas A&M; Semifinals		Charles Schwab Field	**L** 0–6	J. Lamkin (3–2)	**L. Peterson** (3–6)	None	25,429	36–30	2–2

Schedule source:

*Rankings are based on the team's current ranking in the D1Baseball poll.

== Record vs. conference opponents ==
Last two did not qualify for conf. tourn. Blank are not scheduled. Blue are home games, otherwise away.

2024 SEC baseball records Source: 2024 SEC baseball game results, 2024 SEC baseball schedule
Team	W–L	ALA	ARK	AUB	FLA	UGA	KEN	LSU	MSU	MIZZ	MISS	SCAR	TENN	TAMU	VAN	Team	Div	SR	SW
ALA	13–17		2–1	1–2	.	0–3	0–3	2–1	1–2	.	2–1	2–1	2–1	1–2	.	ALA	W4	5–5	0–2
ARK	20–10	1–2		2–1	2–1	.	1–2	3–0	2–1	3–0	3–0	2–1	.	1–2	.	ARK	W1	7–3	3–0
AUB	8–22	2–1	1–2		.	.	0–3	1–2	0–3	2–1	1–2	.	1–2	0–3	0–3	AUB	W7	2–8	0–4
FLA	13–17	.	1–2	.		2–1	1–2	2–1	2–1	0–3	.	1–2	1–2	2–1	1–2	FLA	E5	4–6	0–1
UGA	17–13	3–0	.	.	1–2		0–3	.	1–2	2–1	2–1	3–0	1–2	1–2	3–0	UGA	E3	5–5	3–1
KEN	22–8	3–0	2–1	3–0	2–1	3–0		.	.	2–1	3–0	1–2	1–2	.	2–1	KEN	E2	8–2	4–0
LSU	13–17	1–2	0–3	2–1	1–2	.	.		1–2	2–1	3–0	.	0–3	2–1	1–2	LSU	W5	4–6	1–2
MSU	17–13	2–1	1–2	3–0	1–2	2–1	.	2–1		2–1	1–2	.		1–2	2–1	MSU	W3	6–4	1–0
MIZZ	9–21	.	0–3	1–2	3–0	1–2	1–2	1–2	1–2		.	1–2	0–3	.	0–3	MIZZ	E7	1–9	1–3
MISS	11–19	1–2	0–3	2–1	.	1–2	0–3	0–3	2–1	.		2–1	1–2	2–1	.	MISS	W6	4–6	0–3
SCAR	13–17	1–2	1–2	.	2–1	0–3	2–1	.	.	2–1	1–2		0–3	1–2	3–0	SCAR	E6	4–6	1–2
TENN	22–8	1–2	.	2–1	2–1	2–1	2–1	3–0	.	3–0	2–1	3–0		.	2–1	TENN	E1	9–1	3–0
TAMU	19–11	2–1	2–1	3–0	1–2	2–1	.	1–2	2–1	.	1–2	2–1	.		3–0	TAMU	W2	7–3	2–0
VAN	13–17	.	.	3–0	2–1	0–3	1–2	2–1	1–2	3–0	.	0–3	1–2	0–3		VAN	E4	4–6	2–3
Team	W–L	ALA	ARK	AUB	FLA	UGA	KEN	LSU	MSU	MIZZ	MISS	SCAR	TENN	TAMU	VAN	Team	Div	SR	SW

Updated for entire regular season. Tie Brkrs: TENN>KEN head to head. MSU>UGA head to head. ALA>VAN & FLA>SCAR & LSU TENN common. VAN>FLA head to head. SCAR>LSU ARK common. ARK SEC Tournament seed>KEN, ARK West champion.

== Rankings ==
Ranking movements Legend: ██ Increase in ranking ██ Decrease in ranking — = Not ranked RV = Received votes ( ) = First-place votes
	Week																	
Poll	Pre	1	2	3	4	5	6	7	8	9	10	11	12	13	14	15	16	Final
Coaches'	3 (5)	3 (5)*	4 (2)	7	11	8	6 (1)	9	18	RV	—	—	—	—	—	—	—*	6
Baseball America	4	5	5	6	10	8	4	4	—	—	—	—	—	—	—	—	—*	6
NCBWA†	3	6	6	8	15	10	8	10	24	—	RV	RV	RV	RV	RV	RV	13	5
D1Baseball	2	4	4	4	8	6	6	6	24	—	—	—	—	—	—	—	—*	8
Perfect Game	4	6	6	8	11	6	4	6	16	—	—	—	—	—	—	—	14	4

† NCBWA ranks 30 teams in their preseason poll, but only ranks 25 teams weekly during the season.
* A new poll was not released for this week, so for comparison purposes, the previous week's ranking is inserted in this week's slot.
