= 2024 Auburn Tigers baseball team =

American college baseball season

2024 Auburn Tigers baseball
- Conference: Southeastern Conference
- Western Division
- Record: 27–26 (8–22 SEC)
- Head coach: Butch Thompson (9th season)
- Assistant coaches: Gabe Gross; Karl Nonemaker
- Home stadium: Plainsman Park

2024 Southeastern Conference baseball standings
	Conf.				Overall
Team	W		L	PCT	W		L	PCT
Eastern
No. 1 Tennessee ^{x}‍†‍‡‍^{y}	22	–	8	.733	60	–	13	.822
No. 3 Kentucky ^{x}‍†‍‍^{y}	22	–	8	.733	46	–	16	.742
No. 11 Georgia ‍‍‍^{y}	17	–	13	.567	43	–	17	.717
Vanderbilt ‍‍‍^{y}	13	–	17	.433	38	–	23	.623
No. 8 Florida ‍‍‍^{y}	13	–	17	.433	36	–	30	.545
South Carolina ‍‍‍^{y}	13	–	17	.433	37	–	25	.597
Missouri ‍‍‍	9	–	21	.300	23	–	32	.418
Western
No. 17 Arkansas ^{x}‍‍‍^{y}	20	–	10	.667	44	–	16	.733
No. 2 Texas A&M ‍‍‍^{y}	19	–	11	.633	53	–	15	.779
No. 22 Mississippi State ‍‍‍^{y}	17	–	13	.567	40	–	23	.635
Alabama ‍‍‍^{y}	13	–	17	.433	33	–	24	.579
LSU ‍‍‍^{y}	13	–	17	.433	43	–	23	.652
Ole Miss ‍‍‍	11	–	19	.367	27	–	29	.482
Auburn ‍‍‍	8	–	22	.267	27	–	26	.509
x – Division champion † – Conference champion ‡ – Tournament champion y – Invited to the NCAA Tournament; As of June 24, 2024; Rankings from D1Baseball

The 2024 Auburn Tigers baseball team represented Auburn University in the 2024 NCAA Division I baseball season. The Tigers played their home games at Plainsman Park.

== Previous season ==
In 2023, the Tigers finished 34–23–1, finishing 3rd in the SEC West division. They were invited to the postseason, playing in the Auburn Regional of the NCAA Tournament, finishing 0–2.

== Personnel ==
=== Roster ===
2024 Auburn Tigers roster
Pitchers: 12 - Drew Nelson - Sophomore; 13 - Ben Schorr - (redshirt) Junior; 20 - Dylan Watts - Sophomore; 22 - Hayden Murphy - Sophomore; 23 - Parker Carlson - Junior; 24 - Carson Myers - Junior; 25 - Tanner Bauman - Senior; 29 - Christian Herberholz - (redshirt) Senior; 32 - Griffin Graves - Freshman; 33 - Will Cannon - Junior; 38 - Conner McBride - Junior; 40 - Cam Tilly - Freshman; 41 - John Armstrong - Junior; 43 - Alex Petrovic - Freshman; 45 - Joseph Gonzalez - (redshirt) Junior; 46 - Chase Allsup - Junior; 47 - Cameron Keshock - Sophomore; 49 - Drew Sofield - Freshman; 53 - Konner Keplinger - Freshman; 54 - Konner Copeland - Fifth Year; 77 - Zach Crotchfelt - Sophomore	Catchers: 4 - Carter Wright - Senior; 6 - Cale Stricklin - Freshman; 18 - Ike Irish - Sophomore; Infielders: 1 - Caden Green - Senior; 2 - Cooper Weiss - Graduate Student; 5 - Javon Hernandez - Senior; 7 - Deric Fabian - Junior; 8 - Eric Guevara - Freshman; 10 - Kaleb Freeman - Junior; 11 - Gavin Miller - Sophomore; 19 - Christian Hall - Graduate Student; 26 - Cooper McMurray - (redshirt) Junior; 51 - Ty Mauldin - (redshirt) Junior; 52 - Sam Robertson - Freshman	Outfielders: 3 - Chris Stanfield - Sophomore; 14 - Cade Belyeu - Freshman; 16 - Cole Edwards - Freshman; 21 - Mason Maners - Senior; 27 - Bobby Pierce - Graduate Student; 42 - Griffin Cameron - Freshman

=== Coaching staff ===
2024 Auburn Tigers coaching staff
Name	Position
Butch Thompson	Head coach
Karl Nonemaker	Associate Head Coach
Gabe Gross	Associate Head Coach
Everett Teaford	Pitching Coach

== Schedule and results ==
2024 Auburn Tigers baseball game log
Regular season

February (7–1)
Date	Opponent	Rank	Site/stadium	Score	Win	Loss	Save	TV	Attendance	Overall record	SEC record
February 16	Eastern Kentucky		Plainsman Park	**W** 17–6^{7}	**Bauman** (1–0)	Milburn (0–1)	None	SECN+	4,403	1–0	–
February 17	Eastern Kentucky		Plainsman Park	**W** 6–1	**Gonzalez** (1–0)	Hall (0–1)	None	SECN+	3,951	2–0	–
February 18	Eastern Kentucky		Plainsman Park	**W** 9–1	**Myers** (1–0)	Yates (0–1)	**Herberholz** (1)	SECN+	3,854	3–0	–
February 20	UAB		Plainsman Park	**W** 7–2	**Graves** (1–0)	Clack (0–1)	None	SECN+	4,107	4–0	–
Jax College Baseball Classic
February 23	vs. Iowa		121 Financial Ballpark; Jacksonville, FL	**W** 7–5	**Tilly** (1–0)	Whitlock (1–1)	None	D1Baseball	2,641	5–0	–
February 24	vs. Wichita State		121 Financial Ballpark	**W** 19–8^{7}	**Gonzalez** (2–0)	LaPour (0–1)	None	D1Baseball	4,451	6–0	–
February 25	vs. Virginia		121 Financial Ballpark	**L** 4–6	Jaxel (2–0)	**Herberholz** (0–1)	Teel (3)	D1Baseball	4,117	6–1	–
February 27	Samford	No. 23	Plainsman Park	**W** 12–3	**McBride** (1–0)	Malone (0–1)	None	SECN+	3,951	7–1	–

March (9–10)
Date	Opponent	Rank	Site/stadium	Score	Win	Loss	Save	TV	Attendance	Overall record	SEC record
March 2 (DH)	UConn	No. 23	Plainsman Park	**W** 8–1	**Allsup** (1–0)	Coe (1–2)	**Armstrong** (1)	SECN+	4,239	8–1	–
March 2 (DH)	UConn	No. 23	Plainsman Park	**L** 4–8	Van Emon (1–0)	**Gonzalez** (2–1)	Afthim (2)	SECN+	4,239	8–2	–
March 3	UConn	No. 23	Plainsman Park	**W** 8–2	**Tilly** (2–0)	Quigley (0–2)	None	SECN+	3,497	9–2	–
March 5	Air Force	No. 19	Plainsman Park	Canceled (weather)							
March 6	Air Force	No. 19	Plainsman Park	**W** 8–4	**McBride** (2–0)	Davidson (0–1)	None	SECN+	3,362	10–2	–
March 8	Austin Peay	No. 19	Plainsman Park	**W** 7–6	**Bauman** (2–0)	Hampu (1–1)	None	SECN+	3,265	11–2	–
March 9	Austin Peay	No. 19	Plainsman Park	**L** 5–16	Devine (3–0)	**Myers** (1–1)	None	SECN+	3,826	11–3	–
March 10	Austin Peay	No. 19	Plainsman Park	**W** 24–5^{7}	**Tilly** (3–0)	Howitt (0–1)	None	SECN+	3,827	12–3	–
March 12	vs. Troy	No. 18	Toyota Field; Madison, AL	**W** 8–2	**McBride** (3–0)	Gainous (1–1)	None	YouTube	6,138	13–3	–
March 15	at No. 9 Vanderbilt	No. 18	Hawkins Field; Nashville, TN	**L** 1–11^{8}	Holton (3–0)	**Allsup** (1–1)	None	SECN+	3,802	13–4	0–1
March 16	at No. 9 Vanderbilt	No. 18	Hawkins Field	**L** 5–13	Cunningham (3–0)	**Myers** (1–2)	None	SECN+	3,802	13–5	0–2
March 17	at No. 9 Vanderbilt	No. 18	Hawkins Field	**L** 6–9	Carter (2–0)	**Bauman** (2–1)	Ginther (3)	SECN+	3,802	13–6	0–3
March 19	vs. South Alabama	No. 23	Riverwalk Stadium; Montgomery, AL	**W** 2–1	**Carlson** (1–0)	Starling (3–1)	**Watts (1)**	WarEagle+	1,760	14–6	–
March 21	No. 1 Arkansas	No. 23	Plainsman Park	**L** 0–1	Smith (4–0)	**McBride** (3–1)	Gaeckle (5)	SECN	4,410	14–7	0–4
March 22	No. 1 Arkansas	No. 23	Plainsman Park	**L** 5–6	Dossett (1–0)	**Armstrong** (0–1)	McEntire (2)	SECN+	4,006	14–8	0–5
March 23	No. 1 Arkansas	No. 23	Plainsman Park	**W** 8–6	**Carlson** (2–0)	Gaeckle (0–2)	**Cannon** (1)	SECN+	5,087	15–8	1–5
March 26	Jacksonville State		Plainsman Park	**W** 13–3^{7}	**Herberholz** (1–1)	Hoppenjans (0–1)	None	SECN+	4,180	16–8	–
March 28	at No. 4 Texas A&M		Blue Bell Park; College Station, TX	**L** 7–9	Aschenbeck (4–0)	**Carlson** (2–1)	None	SECN+	6,466	16–9	1–6
March 29	at No. 4 Texas A&M		Blue Bell Park	**L** 8–12	Jones (2–1)	**Allsup** (1–2)	None	SECN+	6,664	16–10	1–7
March 30	at No. 4 Texas A&M		Blue Bell Park	**L** 9–10^{12}	Moss (3–0)	**Schorr** (0–1)	None	SECN	6,484	16–11	1–8

April (5–11)
Date	Opponent	Rank	Site/stadium	Score	Win	Loss	Save	TV	Attendance	Overall record	SEC record
April 3	vs. UAB		Regions Field; Birmingham, AL	**W** 10–4	**Crotchfelt** (1–0)	Ballard (0–1)	None	ESPN+	578	17–11	–
April 5	No. 4 Tennessee		Plainsman Park	**W** 9–5	**Myers** (2–2)	Causey (5–2)	**Armstrong** (2)	SECN+	5,119	18–11	2–8
April 6	No. 4 Tennessee		Plainsman Park	**L** 2–12^{7}	Beam (4–1)	**McBride** (3–2)	None	SECN+	5,566	18–12	2–9
April 7	No. 4 Tennessee		Plainsman Park	**L** 5–19^{7}	Snead (6–1)	**Cannon** (0–1)	None	SECN+	4,468	18–13	2–10
April 9	Alabama State		Plainsman Park	**L** 2–3	Araujo (2–1)	**Crotchfelt** (1–1)	Laboy (1)	SECN	3,483	18–14	–
April 11	No. 8 Kentucky		Plainsman Park	**L** 5–6	Smith (2–2)	**Myers** (2–3)	Hummel (3)	ESPNU	4,057	18–15	2–11
April 12	No. 8 Kentucky		Plainsman Park	**L** 1–9	Niman (7–2)	**Allsup** (1–3)	None	SECN+	4,830	18–15	2–12
April 13	No. 8 Kentucky		Plainsman Park	**L** 8–13	Hogan (1–0)	**Tilly** (3–1)	Hummel (4)	SECN+	5,015	18–16	2–13
April 16	Georgia Tech		Plainsman Park	**W** 12–8	**Murphy** (1–0)	McGuire (2–3)	None	SECN	4,536	19–17	–
April 19	at Mississippi State		Dudy Noble Field; Starkville, MS	**L** 1–8	Stephen (6–2)	**Watts** (0–1)	None	SECN+	13,357	19–18	2–14
April 21 (DH)	at Mississippi State		Dudy Noble Field	**L** 1–3^{7}	Cijntje (6–1)	**Bauman** (2–2)	Hardin (1)	SECN	12,978	19–19	2–15
April 21 (DH)	at Mississippi State		Dudy Noble Field	**L** 3–4^{8}	Hardin (3–0)	**Herberholz** (1–2)	None	SECN+	12,978	19–20	2–16
April 23	Florida A&M		Plainsman Park	**W** 11–1^{7}	**Allsup** (2–3)	Wagner (0–3)	None	SECN+	3,668	20–20	–
April 26	at LSU		Alex Box Stadium; Baton Rouge, LA	**L** 0–5	Jump (4–1)	**Watts** (0–2)	None	SECN+	11,006	20–21	2–17
April 27	at LSU		Alex Box Stadium	**L** 2–3	Hurd (2–4)	**McBride** (3–3)	None	SECN+	11,603	20–22	2–18
April 28	at LSU		Alex Box Stadium	**W** 7–5	**Armstrong** (1–1)	Anderson (4–2)	**Carlson** (1)	SECN+	10,531	21–22	3–18

May (6–3)
Date	Opponent	Rank	Site/stadium	Score	Win	Loss	Save	TV	Attendance	Overall record	SEC record
May 3	Ole Miss		Plainsman Park	**L** 7–11	Maddox (3–6)	**Watts** (0–3)	Morris (1)	SECN+	4,536	21–23	3–19
May 4	Ole Miss		Plainsman Park	**L** 4–5	Mendes (1–1)	**Armstrong** (1–2)	None	SECN	4,573	21–24	3–20
May 5	Ole Miss		Plainsman Park	**W** 10–9	**Carlson** (3–1)	Quinn (1–2)	None	SECN+	4,084	22–24	4–20
May 7	at Georgia Tech		Russ Chandler Stadium; Atlanta, GA	**W** 7–2	**Schorr** (1–1)	Hill (3–1)	**Herberholz** (2)		2,010	23–24	–
May 10	at Missouri		Taylor Stadium; Columbia, MO	**L** 11–12	Mayer (2–6)	**Carlson** (3–2)	None	SECN+	1,446	23–25	4–21
May 11	at Missouri		Taylor Stadium	**W** 12–2^{8}	**Allsup** (3–3)	Lohse (0–3)	**Myers** (1)	SECN+	1,635	24–25	5–21
May 12	at Missouri		Taylor Stadium	**W** 9–7	**Herberholz** (2–2)	Magdic (1–3)	None	SECN+	1,395	25–25	6–21
May 14	vs. Samford		Hoover Met; Hoover, AL	Canceled (weather)							–
May 16	Alabama		Plainsman Park	**W** 4–2	**Bauman** (3–2)	Farone (4–3)	**Cannon** (2)		4,403	26–25	7–21
May 17	Alabama		Plainsman Park	**W** 12–11	**Allsup** (4–3)	Adams (4–5)	**Murphy** (1)		4,403	27–25	8–21
May 18	Alabama		Plainsman Park	**L** 5–12	Hess (5–4)	**Watts** (0–4)	None	SECN	4,631	27–26	8–22

Legend: = Win = Loss = Canceled
Bold = Auburn team member
Rankings are based on the team's current ranking in the D1Baseball poll.

Schedule source:

== Record vs. conference opponents ==
Last two did not qualify for conf. tourn. Blank are not scheduled. Blue are home games, otherwise away.

2024 SEC baseball records Source: 2024 SEC baseball game results, 2024 SEC baseball schedule
Team	W–L	ALA	ARK	AUB	FLA	UGA	KEN	LSU	MSU	MIZZ	MISS	SCAR	TENN	TAMU	VAN	Team	Div	SR	SW
ALA	13–17		2–1	1–2	.	0–3	0–3	2–1	1–2	.	2–1	2–1	2–1	1–2	.	ALA	W4	5–5	0–2
ARK	20–10	1–2		2–1	2–1	.	1–2	3–0	2–1	3–0	3–0	2–1	.	1–2	.	ARK	W1	7–3	3–0
AUB	8–22	2–1	1–2		.	.	0–3	1–2	0–3	2–1	1–2	.	1–2	0–3	0–3	AUB	W7	2–8	0–4
FLA	13–17	.	1–2	.		2–1	1–2	2–1	2–1	0–3	.	1–2	1–2	2–1	1–2	FLA	E5	4–6	0–1
UGA	17–13	3–0	.	.	1–2		0–3	.	1–2	2–1	2–1	3–0	1–2	1–2	3–0	UGA	E3	5–5	3–1
KEN	22–8	3–0	2–1	3–0	2–1	3–0		.	.	2–1	3–0	1–2	1–2	.	2–1	KEN	E2	8–2	4–0
LSU	13–17	1–2	0–3	2–1	1–2	.	.		1–2	2–1	3–0	.	0–3	2–1	1–2	LSU	W5	4–6	1–2
MSU	17–13	2–1	1–2	3–0	1–2	2–1	.	2–1		2–1	1–2	.		1–2	2–1	MSU	W3	6–4	1–0
MIZZ	9–21	.	0–3	1–2	3–0	1–2	1–2	1–2	1–2		.	1–2	0–3	.	0–3	MIZZ	E7	1–9	1–3
MISS	11–19	1–2	0–3	2–1	.	1–2	0–3	0–3	2–1	.		2–1	1–2	2–1	.	MISS	W6	4–6	0–3
SCAR	13–17	1–2	1–2	.	2–1	0–3	2–1	.	.	2–1	1–2		0–3	1–2	3–0	SCAR	E6	4–6	1–2
TENN	22–8	1–2	.	2–1	2–1	2–1	2–1	3–0	.	3–0	2–1	3–0		.	2–1	TENN	E1	9–1	3–0
TAMU	19–11	2–1	2–1	3–0	1–2	2–1	.	1–2	2–1	.	1–2	2–1	.		3–0	TAMU	W2	7–3	2–0
VAN	13–17	.	.	3–0	2–1	0–3	1–2	2–1	1–2	3–0	.	0–3	1–2	0–3		VAN	E4	4–6	2–3
Team	W–L	ALA	ARK	AUB	FLA	UGA	KEN	LSU	MSU	MIZZ	MISS	SCAR	TENN	TAMU	VAN	Team	Div	SR	SW

Updated for entire regular season. Tie Brkrs: TENN>KEN head to head. MSU>UGA head to head. ALA>VAN & FLA>SCAR & LSU TENN common. VAN>FLA head to head. SCAR>LSU ARK common. ARK SEC Tournament seed>KEN, ARK West champion.

== Rankings ==
Ranking movements Legend: ██ Increase in ranking ██ Decrease in ranking — = Not ranked
	Week																		
Poll	Pre	1	2	3	4	5	6	7	8	9	10	11	12	13	14	15	16	17	Final
Coaches'	—	—*	22	20	19	24	—	—	—	—	—	—	—	—	—	—	—	—	
Baseball America	23	20	19	18	17	—	—	—	—	—	—	—	—	—	—	—	—	—	
NCBWA†	25	22	20	20	20	—	—	—	—	—	—	—	—	—	—	—	—	—	
D1Baseball	—	—	23	19	18	23	—	—	—	—	—	—	—	—	—	—	—	—	
Perfect Game	15	14	14	13	12	17	21	—	—	—	—	—	—	—	—	—	—	—	

† NCBWA ranks 30 teams in their preseason poll, but only ranks 25 teams weekly during the season.
* A new poll was not released for this week, so for comparison purposes, the previous week's ranking is inserted in this week's slot.
