= 2024 Southeastern Conference baseball tournament =

2024 baseball tournament

- Teams: 12
- Format: See below
- Finals site: Hoover Metropolitan Stadium; Hoover, AL
- Champions: Tennessee (5th title)
- Winning coach: Tony Vitello (2nd title)
- MVP: Blake Burke (Tennessee)
- Attendance: 180,004 (record)
- Television: SEC Network, ESPN2

2024 Southeastern Conference baseball standings
	Conf.				Overall
Team	W		L	PCT	W		L	PCT
Eastern
No. 1 Tennessee ^{x}‍†‍‡‍^{y}	22	–	8	.733	60	–	13	.822
No. 3 Kentucky ^{x}‍†‍‍^{y}	22	–	8	.733	46	–	16	.742
No. 11 Georgia ‍‍‍^{y}	17	–	13	.567	43	–	17	.717
Vanderbilt ‍‍‍^{y}	13	–	17	.433	38	–	23	.623
No. 8 Florida ‍‍‍^{y}	13	–	17	.433	36	–	30	.545
South Carolina ‍‍‍^{y}	13	–	17	.433	37	–	25	.597
Missouri ‍‍‍	9	–	21	.300	23	–	32	.418
Western
No. 17 Arkansas ^{x}‍‍‍^{y}	20	–	10	.667	44	–	16	.733
No. 2 Texas A&M ‍‍‍^{y}	19	–	11	.633	53	–	15	.779
No. 22 Mississippi State ‍‍‍^{y}	17	–	13	.567	40	–	23	.635
Alabama ‍‍‍^{y}	13	–	17	.433	33	–	24	.579
LSU ‍‍‍^{y}	13	–	17	.433	43	–	23	.652
Ole Miss ‍‍‍	11	–	19	.367	27	–	29	.482
Auburn ‍‍‍	8	–	22	.267	27	–	26	.509
x – Division champion † – Conference champion ‡ – Tournament champion y – Invited to the NCAA Tournament; As of June 24, 2024; Rankings from D1Baseball

The 2024 Southeastern Conference baseball tournament was the postseason baseball tournament for the Southeastern Conference for the 2024 NCAA Division I baseball season, held from May 21–26 at Hoover Metropolitan Stadium in Hoover, Alabama. Tennessee earned the conference's automatic bid to the 2024 NCAA Division I baseball tournament.

This is the twenty-fifth consecutive year and twenty-seventh overall that the event has been scheduled to be held at Hoover Metropolitan Stadium, known from 2007 through 2012 as Regions Park.

== Format and seeding ==
The regular season division winners claim the top two seeds and the next ten teams by conference winning percentage, regardless of division, claim the remaining berths in the tournament. The bottom eight teams play a single-elimination opening round, followed by a double-elimination format until the semifinals, when the format reverts to single elimination through the championship game. This is the eleventh year of this format.

Team	W–L	Pct	GB No. 1	Seed
Eastern Division
Tennessee	22–8	.733	–	1
Kentucky	22–8	.733	–	3
Georgia	17–13	.567	5	6
Vanderbilt	13–17	.433	9	8
Florida	13–17	.433	9	9
South Carolina	13–17	.433	9	10
Missouri	9–21	.300	13	

Team	W–L	Pct	GB No. 1	Seed
Western Division
Arkansas	20–10	.667	2	2
Texas A&M	19–11	.633	3	4
Mississippi State	17–13	.567	5	5
Alabama	13–17	.433	9	7
LSU	13–17	.433	9	11
Ole Miss	11–19	.367	11	12
Auburn	8–22	.267	14	

== Bracket ==
First round Tuesday, May 21
6	Georgia	1
11	LSU	9
7	Alabama	5
10	South Carolina	10
8	Vanderbilt	6
9	Florida	3
5	Mississippi State	2
12	Ole Miss	1

Second round Wednesday, May 22; Thursday, May 23
3	Kentucky	0
11	LSU	11^{8}
2	Arkansas	5
10	South Carolina	6
3	Kentucky	9
2	Arkansas	6
1	Tennessee	4
8	Vanderbilt	13
4	Texas A&M	3
5	Mississippi State	5
1	Tennessee	7
4	Texas A&M	4

Third round Thursday, May 23; Friday, May 24
11	LSU	11
10	South Carolina	10
3	Kentucky	5
10	South Carolina	6
8	Vanderbilt	4
5	Mississippi State	3
1	Tennessee	6
5	Mississippi State	5

Semifinals; Saturday, May 25
11	LSU	12
10	South Carolina	11^{10}
8	Vanderbilt	4
1	Tennessee	6

Final; Sunday, May 26
11	LSU	3
1	Tennessee	4

== Schedule ==
Game	Time*	Matchup^{#}	Score	Television	Attendance
Tuesday, May 21
1	9:30 a.m.	No. 6 Georgia vs. No. 11 LSU	1−9	SEC Network	7,425
2	1:00 p.m.	No. 7 Alabama vs. No. 10 South Carolina	5−10	SEC Network	7,425
3	4:30 p.m.	No. 8 Vanderbilt vs. No. 9 Florida	6–3	SEC Network	9,240
4	8:00 p.m.	No. 5 Mississippi State vs. No. 12 Ole Miss	2–1	SEC Network	9,240
Wednesday, May 22
5	9:30 a.m.	No. 3 Kentucky vs. No. 11 LSU	0–11^{8}	SEC Network	7,185
6	1:00 p.m.	No. 2 Arkansas vs. No. 10 South Carolina	5–6	SEC Network	7,185
7	4:30 p.m.	No. 1 Tennessee vs. No. 8 Vanderbilt	4–13	SEC Network	11,840
8	8:00 p.m.	No. 4 Texas A&M vs. No. 5 Mississippi State	3–5	SEC Network	11,840
Thursday, May 23
9	9:30 a.m.	No. 3 Kentucky vs. No. 2 Arkansas	9–6	SEC Network	6,825
10	1:00 p.m.	No. 1 Tennessee vs. No. 4 Texas A&M	7–4	SEC Network	6,825
11	4:30 p.m.	No. 11 LSU vs. No. 10 South Carolina	11–10	SEC Network	11,923
12	8:00 p.m.	No. 8 Vanderbilt vs. No. 5 Mississippi State	4–3	SEC Network	11,923
Friday, May 24
13	3:00 p.m.	No. 3 Kentucky vs. No. 10 South Carolina	5–6	SEC Network	13,335
14	6:30 p.m.	No. 1 Tennessee vs. No. 5 Mississippi State	6–5	SEC Network	13,335
Semifinals – Saturday, May 25
15	12:00 p.m	No. 10 South Carolina vs. No. 11 LSU	11–12^{10}	SEC Network	14,386
16	3:30 p.m.	No. 1 Tennessee vs. No. 8 Vanderbilt	6–4	SEC Network	14,386
Championship – Sunday, May 26
17	2:00 p.m.	No. 11 LSU vs. No. 1 Tennessee	3–4	ESPN2	15,686
*Game times in CDT. # – Rankings denote tournament seed.
