= 2025 Tennessee Volunteers baseball team =

College Baseball Season

2025 Tennessee Volunteers baseball

Knoxville Regional champions

Fayetteville Super Regional, 0–2
- Conference: Southeastern Conference

Ranking
- Coaches: No. 16
- D1Baseball.com: No. 16
- Record: 46–19 (16–14 SEC)
- Head coach: Tony Vitello (8th season)
- Assistant coaches: Frank Anderson; Josh Elander; Ross Kivett
- Home stadium: Lindsey Nelson Stadium

Uniform
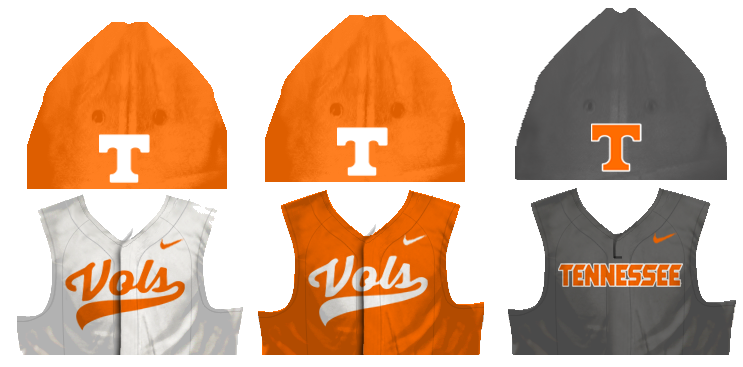

2025 Southeastern Conference baseball standings
	Conf.				Overall
Team	W		L	PCT	W		L	PCT
No. 17 Texas ‍†‍‍^{y}	22	–	8	.733	44	–	14	.759
No. 3 Arkansas ‍‍‍^{y}	20	–	10	.667	50	–	15	.769
No. 1 LSU ‍‍‍^{y}	19	–	11	.633	53	–	15	.779
No. 18 Vanderbilt ‍‍‡‍^{y}	19	–	11	.633	43	–	18	.705
No. 19 Georgia ‍‍‍^{y}	18	–	12	.600	43	–	17	.717
No. 11 Auburn ‍‍‍^{y}	17	–	13	.567	41	–	20	.672
No. 21 Ole Miss ‍‍‍^{y}	16	–	14	.533	43	–	21	.672
No. 12 Tennessee ‍‍‍^{y}	16	–	14	.533	46	–	19	.708
Alabama ‍‍‍^{y}	16	–	14	.533	41	–	18	.695
Florida ‍‍‍^{y}	15	–	15	.500	39	–	22	.639
Mississippi State ‍‍‍^{y}	15	–	15	.500	36	–	23	.610
Oklahoma ‍‍‍^{y}	14	–	16	.467	38	–	22	.633
Kentucky ‍‍‍^{y}	13	–	17	.433	31	–	26	.544
Texas A&M ‍‍‍	11	–	19	.367	30	–	26	.536
South Carolina ‍‍‍	6	–	24	.200	28	–	29	.491
Missouri ‍‍‍	3	–	27	.100	16	–	39	.291
† – Conference champion ‡ – Tournament champion y – Invited to the NCAA Tournament; As of June 22, 2025; Rankings from D1Baseball

The 2025 Tennessee Volunteers baseball team represents the University of Tennessee in the 2025 NCAA Division I baseball season. The Volunteers play their home games at Lindsey Nelson Stadium. This was Tennessee's final season with Tony Vitello as their head coach, as he went on to be hired as manager of Major League Baseball's San Francisco Giants following the season.

== Previous season ==
The Volunteers finished 60–13 and 22–8 in the SEC, good for first place in the East division. They won the SEC Tournament, Knoxville Regional and Super Regional, and College World Series.

== Preseason ==
=== Preseason SEC awards and honors ===
The Vols had six players named to SEC preseason teams

Preseason All-SEC First Team
Player	No.	Position	Class
Dean Curley	1	SS	Sophomore
Nate Snead	7	RP	Junior
Liam Doyle	12	SP	Junior

Preseason All-SEC Second Team
Player	No.	Position	Class
Gavin Kilen	6	2B	Junior
Hunter Ensley	9	OF	RS-Senior
Andrew Fischer	11	3B	Junior

=== Coaches Poll ===
The SEC Coaches poll was released on February 2, 2025. Tennessee was predicted to finish second in the SEC.

SEC coaches poll
Predicted finish	Team	Votes (1st place)
1	Texas A&M	228 (10)
2	Tennessee	215 (1)
3	Arkansas	214 (3)
4	LSU	204 (1)
5	Florida	183 (1)
6	Georgia	165
7	Vanderbilt	156
8	Texas	146
9	Mississippi State	112
10	Kentucky	102
11	Oklahoma	101
12	Auburn	100
13	Alabama	98
14	South Carolina	61
15	Ole Miss	60
16	Missouri	31

== Personnel ==
=== Roster ===
2025 Tennessee Volunteers baseball team
Players
Coaches

#	Pos.	Name	B/T	Height	Weight	Year	Home town
1	INF	Dean Curley	R/R	6 ft 3 in (1.91 m)	218 lb (99 kg)	So	La Verne, CA
2	INF	Ariel Antigua	R/R	5 ft 8 in (1.73 m)	180 lb (82 kg)	So	West Palm Beach, FL
4	INF	Manny Marin	R/R	6 ft 1 in (1.85 m)	181 lb (82 kg)	Fr	Hialeah, FL
5	C	Cannon Peebles	S/R	5 ft 11 in (1.8 m)	190 lb (86 kg)	Jr	Ashland, VA
6	INF	Gavin Kilen	L/R	5 ft 11 in (1.8 m)	187 lb (85 kg)	Jr	Milton, WI
7	RHP	Nate Snead	R/R	6 ft 2 in (1.88 m)	212 lb (96 kg)	Jr	South Milwaukee, WI
8	UTL	Jay Abernathy	L/R	5 ft 10 in (1.78 m)	177 lb (80 kg)	Fr	Atlanta, GA
9	OF	Hunter Ensley	R/R	6 ft 1 in (1.85 m)	197 lb (89 kg)	RS Sr	Huntingdon, TN
10	UTL	Chris Newstrom	R/R	6 ft 2 in (1.88 m)	204 lb (93 kg)	Fr	Phoenix, AZ
11	INF	Andrew Fischer	L/R	6 ft 1 in (1.85 m)	210 lb (95 kg)	Jr	Manasquan, NJ
12	LHP	Liam Doyle	R/L	6 ft 2 in (1.88 m)	220 lb (100 kg)	Jr	Derry, NH
13	OF	Reese Chapman	L/R	6 ft 1 in (1.85 m)	224 lb (102 kg)	Jr	Parker, CO
14	UTL	Blake Grimmer	L/R	6 ft 3 in (1.91 m)	208 lb (94 kg)	RS Fr	Spring Lake, MI
15	UTL	Hunter High	L/R	6 ft 0 in (1.83 m)	199 lb (90 kg)	So	Nashville, TN
16	UTL	Dalton Bargo	L/R	6 ft 1 in (1.85 m)	195 lb (88 kg)	Jr	Omaha, NE
17	RHP	Thomas Crabtree	R/R	6 ft 4 in (1.93 m)	202 lb (92 kg)	So	Collierville, TN
18	RHP	Austin Breedlove	R/R	6 ft 2 in (1.88 m)	200 lb (91 kg)	Jr	Ooltewah, TN
19	LHP	Andrew Behnke	L/L	5 ft 10 in (1.78 m)	183 lb (83 kg)	Jr	Nashville, TN
20	OF	Colby Backus	R/R	6 ft 4 in (1.93 m)	230 lb (104 kg)	RS Sr	Johnson City, TN
21	RHP	Tegan Kuhns	S/R	6 ft 3 in (1.91 m)	189 lb (86 kg)	Fr	Gettysburg, PA
23	RHP	Marcus Phillips	R/R	6 ft 4 in (1.93 m)	246 lb (112 kg)	Jr	Sioux Falls, SD
25	LHP	Brandon Arvidson	R/L	6 ft 5 in (1.96 m)	215 lb (98 kg)	RS So	Dripping Springs, TX
27	C	Stone Lawless	R/R	6 ft 2 in (1.88 m)	229 lb (104 kg)	RS Fr	Huntsville, AL
28	RHP	Ryan Combs	R/R	6 ft 3 in (1.91 m)	184 lb (83 kg)	Jr	Sarasota, FL
29	RHP	Aidan Hayse	R/R	6 ft 3 in (1.91 m)	191 lb (87 kg)	Fr	Shorewood, IL
30	UTL	Levi Clark	R/R	6 ft 1 in (1.85 m)	211 lb (96 kg)	Fr	Marietta, GA
31	RHP	Austin Hunley	R/R	6 ft 3 in (1.91 m)	199 lb (90 kg)	RS So	Mount Juliet, TN
32	RHP	Tate Strickland	R/R	6 ft 3 in (1.91 m)	192 lb (87 kg)	Fr	Powder Springs, GA
33	RHP	AJ Russell	R/R	6 ft 6 in (1.98 m)	223 lb (101 kg)	Jr	Franklin, TN
34	RHP	Brayden Krenzel	R/R	6 ft 3 in (1.91 m)	214 lb (97 kg)	Fr	Dublin, OH
35	LHP	Michael Sharman	R/L	6 ft 1 in (1.85 m)	198 lb (90 kg)	RS Jr	Woodstock, GA
36	LHP	Brayden May	L/L	5 ft 11 in (1.8 m)	186 lb (84 kg)	RS Fr	Smyrna, GA
37	LHP	Dylan Loy	R/L	6 ft 0 in (1.83 m)	208 lb (94 kg)	So	Pigeon Forge, TN
38	C	Brooks Wright	R/R	5 ft 10 in (1.78 m)	206 lb (93 kg)	Fr	Knoxville, TN
39	LHP	Dane Bjorn	L/L	6 ft 2 in (1.88 m)	197 lb (89 kg)	RS Fr	St. Louis, MO
40	RHP	Anson Seibert	L/R	6 ft 8 in (2.03 m)	235 lb (107 kg)	Fr	Overland Park, KS
41	OF	Jaxon Walker	L/L	5 ft 11 in (1.8 m)	192 lb (87 kg)	Fr	Loudon, Tennessee
42	LHP	Bryson Thacker	L/L	6 ft 2 in (1.88 m)	189 lb (86 kg)	RS Fr	Rome, GA
43	LHP	Luke Payne	R/L	6 ft 4 in (1.93 m)	200 lb (91 kg)	So	Gallatin, TN
44	RHP	Nic Abraham	L/R	6 ft 5 in (1.96 m)	209 lb (95 kg)	Fr	Elk Grove, CA
45	UTL	Alberto Osuna	R/R	6 ft 1 in (1.85 m)	244 lb (111 kg)	Gr	Mauldin, SC
46	UTL	Brayden Sharp	L/L	6 ft 2 in (1.88 m)	171 lb (78 kg)	RS Fr	The Woodlands, TX
47	INF	Robinson Martin	R/R	5 ft 8 in (1.73 m)	172 lb (78 kg)	Fr	Memphis, TN
48	RHP	Tanner Wiggins	R/R	6 ft 2 in (1.88 m)	189 lb (86 kg)	So	North Richland Hills, TX
49	RHP	Ben Martin	R/R	6 ft 4 in (1.93 m)	225 lb (102 kg)	Fr	Kennesaw, GA
50	RHP	Tanner Franklin	R/R	6 ft 5 in (1.96 m)	225 lb (102 kg)	Jr	Jefferson City, TN
51	INF	Jack Jones	R/R	6 ft 3 in (1.91 m)	227 lb (103 kg)	Fr	Prairie Village, Kansas
52	OF	Brennon Seigler	R/R	6 ft 1 in (1.85 m)	210 lb (95 kg)	Fr	Knoxville, TN
53	INF	Dane Morrow	L/R	6 ft 0 in (1.83 m)	178 lb (81 kg)	Fr	Louisville, KY
54	UTL	Beau Revord	L/R	6 ft 2 in (1.88 m)	200 lb (91 kg)	Fr	Jefferson City, TN
55	RHP	Stratton Scott	R/R	6 ft 2 in (1.88 m)	196 lb (89 kg)	Fr	Knoxville, TN
56	LHP	Ryler Smart	L/L	6 ft 4 in (1.93 m)	236 lb (107 kg)	Fr	Pearland, TX
57	RHP	Andrew DuMont	R/R	6 ft 1 in (1.85 m)	205 lb (93 kg)	Fr	St. Louis, MO

Head coach

Tony Vitello

Assistant coach(es)

Frank Anderson
Josh Elander
Ross Kivett

Legend

- (C) Team captain
- (S) Suspended
- (I) Ineligible
- Injured
- Current redshirt

Roster
Last update: April 7, 2025

=== Coaching staff ===
2025 Tennessee Volunteers coaching staff
Name	Position	Seasons at Tennessee
Tony Vitello	Head coach	8
Frank Anderson	Assistant Coach/Pitching	8
Josh Elander	Assistant Coach/Recruiting Coordinator	8
Ross Kivett	Assistant Coach	1
Ricky Martinez	Director of Player Development	1
Parker Serrano	Student Assistant Coach	2
Quentin Eberhardt	Director of Baseball Sports Performance	8

== Offseason ==
=== Signing Day Recruits ===
The following players signed National Letter of Intents to play for Tennessee in 2025.

Player	Hometown	High School
Pitchers
Tegan Kuhns	Gettysburg, Pennsylvania	Gettysburg Area
Aidan Hayse	Shorewood, Illinois	Joliet Catholic Academy
Tate Strickland	Powder Springs, Georgia	Harrison (GA)
Brayden Krenzel	Dublin, Ohio	Dublin Jerome
Anson Seibert	Overland Park, Kansas	Blue Valley Southwest
Nic Abraham	Elk Grove, California	Franklin (CA)
Ben Martin	Kennesaw, Georgia	Allatoona
Stratton Scott	Knoxville, Tennessee	Farragut
Ryler Smart	Pearland, Texas	Pearland
Andrew DuMont	St. Louis, Missouri	St. Louis University
Hitters
Manny Marin	Hialeah, Florida	Westminster Christian (FL)
Jay Abernathy	Atlanta, Georgia	North Cobb
Chris Newstrom	Phoenix, Arizona	Chaparral (AZ)
Brooks Wright	Knoxville, Tennessee	Bearden (TN)
Jaxon Walker	Loudon, Tennessee	Loudon (TN)
Robinson Martin	Memphis, Tennessee	Houston (TN)
Jack Jones	Prairie Village, Kansas	Shawnee Mission East
Brennon Seigler	Knoxville, Tennessee	Farragut
Dane Morrow	Louisville, Kentucky	Trinity (KS)
Utility
Levi Clark	Marietta, Georgia	George Walton Comprehensive
Beau Revord	Jefferson City, Tennessee	Jefferson County (TN)

=== 2024 MLB draft ===
Round	Pick	Player	Position	MLB Team
#1	#8	Christian Moore	INF	Los Angeles Angels
#1	#34	Blake Burke	1B	Milwaukee Brewers
#2	#60	Billy Amick	3B	Minnesota Twins
#2	#65	Dylan Dreiling	OF	Texas Rangers
#3	#76	Drew Beam	RHP	Kansas City Royals
#4	#134	Kavares Tears	OF	San Diego Padres
#5	#138	AJ Causey	RHP	Kansas City Royals
#8	#229	Aaron Combs	RHP	Chicago White Sox

== Schedule and results ==
2025 Tennessee Volunteers baseball game log (46–19)
Regular season (41–15)
February (9–0)

Date Time (EST)	Opponent	Rank	Site/stadium	Score	Win	Loss	Save	TV	Attendance	Overall record	SEC record
February 14th 4:30 p.m.	vs Hofstra*	No. 4	Lindsey Nelson Stadium; Knoxville, Tennessee	**W 15–0** (7)	**Liam Doyle (1–0)**	Jackson Bauer (0–1)	None	SECN+	6,212	1–0	—
February 15th 2:00 p.m.	vs Hofstra*	No. 4	Lindsey Nelson Stadium; Knoxville, Tennessee	**W 18–1** (7)	**Austin Henley** (1–0)	Tristan Nemjo (0–1)	None	SECN+	5,249	2–0	—
February 16th 11:00 a.m.	vs Hofstra*	No. 4	Lindsey Nelson Stadium; Knoxville, Tennessee	**W 13–1** (7)	**Andrew Behnke** (1–0)	Branden Brown (0–1)	None	SECN+	4,814	3–0	—
February 18th 4:00 p.m.	vs UNC Asheville*	No. 4	Lindsey Nelson Stadium; Knoxville, Tennessee	**W 29–4** (7)	**Nic Abraham** (1–0)	Zachary Gaydos (0–1)	None	SECN+	4,271	4–0	—
February 21st 2:00 p.m.	vs Samford*	No. 4	Lindsey Nelson Stadium; Knoxville, Tennessee	**W 5–1**	**Liam Doyle** (2–0)	Miller Riggins (1–1)	**Tanner Franklin** (1)	SECN+	4,741	5–0	—
February 22nd 2:00 p.m.	vs Samford*	No. 4	Lindsey Nelson Stadium; Knoxville, Tennessee	**W 7–3**	**Nate Snead** (1–0)	Joseph Lee (0–1)	None	SECN+	5,106	6–0	—
February 23rd 1:00 p.m.	vs Samford*	No. 4	Lindsey Nelson Stadium; Knoxville, Tennessee	**W 11–1** (7)	**Austin Hunley** (2–0)	Josh Leerssen (0–1)	None	SECN+	5,142	7–0	—
February 25th 4:30 p.m.	vs North Alabama	No. 3	Lindsey Nelson Stadium; Knoxville, Tennessee	**W 7–5**	**Tegan Kuhns** (1–0)	Reese Young (0–1)	None	SECN+	5,129	8–0	—
February 28th 4:05 p.m.	vs Oklahoma State*; Astros Foundation College Classic	No. 3	Daikin Park; Houston, Texas	**W 5–2**	**Dylan Loy** (1–0)	Gabe Davis (0–1)	**Nate Snead (1)**	Astros.com	11,502	9–0	—

March (17–2)

Date Time(EST)	Opponent	Rank	Site/stadium	Score	Win	Loss	Save	TV	Attendance	Overall record	SEC record
March 1st 12:05 p.m.	vs Rice*; Astros Foundation College Classic	No. 3	Daikin Park; Houston, Texas	**W 13–3**	**Brayden Sharp** (1–0)	Blaine Brown (0–1)	None	Astros.com	16,226	10–0	—
March 2nd 11:05 a.m.	vs Arizona*; Astros Foundation College Classic	No. 3	Daikin Park; Houston, Texas	**W 5–1**	**Brandon Arvidson** (1–0)	Bailey Smith (0–1)	None	Astros.com	9,439	11–0	—
March 4th 6:00 p.m.	vs Radford*	No. 2	Lindsey Nelson Stadium; Knoxville, Tennessee	**W 22–9** (7)	**Dylan Loy** (2–0)	Noah Arnett (0–1)	None	SECN+	5,070	12–0	—
March 5th 5:30 p.m.	vs Xavier*	No. 2	Lindsey Nelson Stadium; Knoxville, Tennessee	**W 13–1**	**Austin Breedlove** (1–0)	Logan Schmidt (0–1)	None	SECN+	4,726	13–0	—
March 7th 6:30 p.m.	vs St. Bonaventure*	No. 2	Lindsey Nelson Stadium; Knoxville, Tennessee	**W 12–0**	**Liam Doyle** (3–0)	James Capellupo (1–1)	None	SECN+	5,468	14–0	—
March 8th 6:00 p.m.	vs St. Bonaventure*	No. 2	Lindsey Nelson Stadium; Knoxville, Tennessee	**W 11–1** (7)	**Marcus Phillips** (1–0)	Michael Salina (1–1)	None	SECN+	6,007	15–0	—
March 9th 1:00 p.m.	vs St. Bonaventure*	No. 2	Lindsey Nelson Stadium; Knoxville, Tennessee	**W 13–2** (7)	**Tegan Kuhns** (2–0)	David James (0–1)	None	SECN+	5,701	16–0	—
March 11th 4:30 p.m.	vs West Georgia*	No. 2	Lindsey Nelson Stadium; Knoxville, Tennessee	**W 4–2**	**Thomas Crabtree** (1–0)	Evimael Quiles (0–1)	**Ryan Combs** (1)	SECN+	5,461	17–0	—
March 14th 6:30 p.m.	vs No. 7 Florida	No. 2	Lindsey Nelson Stadium; Knoxville, Tennessee	**W 5–3**	**Tanner Franklin** (1–0)	Liam Peterson (4–1)	**Nate Snead** (2)	SECN+	6,298	18–0	1–0
March 15th 3:30 p.m.	vs No. 7 Florida	No. 2	Lindsey Nelson Stadium; Knoxville, Tennessee	**W 10–0** (7)	**Marcus Phillips** (2–0)	Aidan King (3–1)	None	SECN	5,575	19–0	2–0
March 16th 1:00 p.m.	vs No. 7 Florida	No. 2	Lindsey Nelson Stadium; Knoxville, Tennessee	**W 7–4**	**Dylan Loy** (3–0)	Billy Barlow (1–1)	**Nate Snead** (3)	SECN+	5,579	20–0	3–0
March 18th 5:00 p.m.	vs East Tennessee State*	No. 1	Lindsey Nelson Stadium; Knoxville, Tennessee	**L 6–7** (10)	Andrew Cotten (1–0)	**Tanner Franklin** (1–1)	None	SECN+	6,331	20–1	—
March 20th 7:30 p.m.	at No. 12 Alabama	No. 1	Sewell-Thomas Stadium; Tuscaloosa, Alabama	**L 5–6**	Zane Adams (4–0)	**Liam Doyle** (3–1)	Carson Ozmer (6)	ESPNU	4,341	20–2	3–1
March 21st 5:00 p.m.	at No. 12 Alabama	No. 1	Sewell-Thomas Stadium; Tuscaloosa, Alabama	**W 10–7**	**Dylan Loy** (4–0)	Riley Quick (4–1)	**Tanner Franklin** (2)	SECN+	5,800	21–2	4–1
March 22nd 2:00 p.m.	at No. 12 Alabama	No. 1	Sewell-Thomas Stadium; Tuscaloosa, Alabama	**W 9–2**	**Brayden Krenzel** (1–0)	Bobby Alcock (3–1)	None	SECN+	5,800	22–2	5–1
March 25th 6:00 p.m.	vs Queens*	No. 1	Lindsey Nelson Stadium; Knoxville, Tennessee	**W 14–3**	**Brandon Arvidson** (2–0)	Andrew White (0–1)	None	SECN+	5,779	23–2	—
Mar 28th 7:00 p.m.	at South Carolina	No. 1	Founders Park; Columbia, South Carolina	**W 11–7**	**Liam Doyle** (4–1)	Jake McCoy (2–3)	None	SECN+	8,242	24–2	6–1
March 29th 4:00 p.m.	at South Carolina	No. 1	Founders Park; Columbia, South Carolina	**W 7–5**	**Nate Snead** (2–0)	Brandon Stone (1–3)	None	SECN+	8,242	25–2	7–1
March 30th 5:00 p.m.	at South Carolina	No. 1	Founders Park; Columbia, South Carolina	**W 7–2**	**Brayden Krenzel** (2–0)	Matthew Becker (2–2)	None	SECN	8,012	26–2	8–1

April (10–7)

Date Time(EST)	Opponent	Rank	Site/stadium	Score	Win	Loss	Save	TV	Attendance	Overall record	SEC record
April 1st 6:00 p.m.	vs Tennessee Tech*	No. 1	Lindsey Nelson Stadium; Knoxville, Tennessee	**W 7–1**	**Michael Sharman** (1–0)	Drew Mattox (0–1)	None	SECN+	5,839	27–2	—
April 4th 7:00 p.m.	vs Texas A&M	No. 1	Lindsey Nelson Stadium; Knoxville, Tennessee	**W 10–0** (7)	**Liam Doyle** (5–1)	Ryan Prager (2–2)	None	ESPNU	6,544	28–2	9–1
April 5th (Game 1); 3:00 p.m.	vs Texas A&M	No. 1	Lindsey Nelson Stadium; Knoxville, Tennessee	**L 3–9**	Justin Lamkin (2–3)	**Marcus Phillips** (2–1)	Weston Moss (1)	SECN+	5,650	28–3	9–2
April 5th (Game 2); 7:00 p.m.	vs Texas A&M	No. 1	Lindsey Nelson Stadium; Knoxville, Tennessee	**L 6–17** (8)	Myles Patton (3–3)	**Tegan Kuhns** (2–1)	None	SECN+	6,074	28–4	9–3
April 8th 6:00 p.m.	vs Alabama State*	No. 5	Lindsey Nelson Stadium; Knoxville, Tennessee	**W 10–2**	**Austin Breedlove** (2–0)	Trey Power (1–2)	None	SECN+	5,081	29–4	—
April 11th TBD p.m.	at No. 6 Ole Miss	No. 5	Swayze Field; Oxford, Mississippi	**W 3–2**	**Liam Doyle** (6–1)	Hunter Elliott (5–1)	**Dylan Loy** (1)	SECN+	11,818	30–4	10–3
April 12th 4:00 p.m.	at No. 6 Ole Miss	No. 5	Swayze Field; Oxford, Mississippi	**L 5–8**	Riley Maddox (4–2)	**Marcus Phillips** (2–2)	Connor Spencer (3)	SECN+	11,790	30–5	10–4
April 13th 3:00 p.m.	at No. 6 Ole Miss	No. 5	Swayze Field; Oxford, Mississippi	**W** 10–8	**Nate Snead** (3–0)	Brayden Jones (1–2)	None	SECN	10,333	31–5	11–4
April 15th 6:00 p.m.	vs Bellarmine*	No. 4	Lindsey Nelson Stadium; Knoxville, Tennessee	**W 13–3** (8)	**Andrew Behnke (2–0)**	Carson Brower (1–2)	None	SECN+	5,305	32–5	—
April 18th 6:30 p.m.	vs Kentucky	No. 4	Lindsey Nelson Stadium; Knoxville, Tennessee	**W 8–2**	**Liam Doyle (7–1)**	Nate Harris (3–2)	None	SECN+	5,956	33–5	12–4
April 19th 6:00 p.m.	vs Kentucky	No. 4	Lindsey Nelson Stadium; Knoxville, Tennessee	**L 1–4**	Nic McCay (4–0)	**Marcus Phillips (3–2)**	Jackson Nove (1)	SECN+	5,801	33–6	12–5
April 20th 1:00 p.m.	vs Kentucky	No. 4	Lindsey Nelson Stadium; Knoxville, Tennessee	**L 2–8**	Ben Cleaver (4–2)	**Tegan Kuhns (2–2)**	None	SECN+	5,586	33–7	12–6
April 22nd 6:00 p.m.	vs Lipscomb*	No. 6	Lindsey Nelson Stadium; Knoxville, Tennessee	**W 11–1** (7)	**Michael Sharman (2–0)**	Ryan Kutz (0–1)	None	SECN+	7,174	34–7	—
April 25th 8:00 p.m.	at No. 7 LSU	No. 6	Alex Box Stadium; Baton Rouge, Louisiana	**L 3–6**	Jacob Mayers (1–0)	**Nate Snead (3–1)**	None	SECN+	12,919	34–8	12–7
April 26th 8:00 p.m.	at No. 7 LSU	No. 6	Alex Box Stadium; Baton Rouge, Louisiana	**W 9–3**	**Marcus Phillips (3–3)**	Anthony Eyanson (6–2)	**Dylan Loy (2)**	ESPNU	13,376	35–8	13–7
April 27th 3:00 p.m.	at No. 7 LSU	No. 6	Alex Box Stadium; Baton Rouge, Louisiana	**L 2–12** (8)	Casan Evans (3–0)	**Michael Sharman** (2–1)	None	SECN	11,847	35–9	13–8
April 29th 6:00 p.m.	vs Northern Kentucky*	No. 12	Lindsey Nelson Stadium; Knoxville, Tennessee	**W 7–5**	**Michael Sharman** (3–1)	Connor Kurki (0–2)	**Nate Snead** (4)	SECN+	5,412	36–9	—

May (5–6)

Date Time(EST)	Opponent	Rank	Site/stadium	Score	Win	Loss	Save	TV	Attendance	Overall record	SEC record
May 2nd 6:30 p.m.	vs No. 10 Auburn	No. 12	Lindsey Nelson Stadium; Knoxville, Tennessee	**L 1–6**	Samuel Dutton (6–2)	**Liam Doyle** (7–2)	Ryan Hetzler (7)	SECN+	5,406	36–10	13–9
May 3rd 6:00 p.m.	vs No. 10 Auburn	No. 12	Lindsey Nelson Stadium; Knoxville, Tennessee	**W 5–4** (11)	**Liam Doyle** (8–2)	Dylan Watts (2–1)	None	SECN+	5,406	37–10	14–9
May 4th 1:00 p.m.	vs No. 10 Auburn	No. 12	Lindsey Nelson Stadium; Knoxville, Tennessee	**L 1–8** (7)	Christian Chatterton (4–1)	**AJ Russell** (0–1)	Cade Fisher (1)	SECN+	6,041	37–11	14–10
May 6th 6:00 p.m.	vs Indiana State*	No. 15	Lindsey Nelson Stadium; Knoxville, Tennessee	**W 12–1** (7)	**Austin Breedlove** (3–0)	Jacob Spencer (0–3)	None	SECN+	5,099	38–11	—
May 9th 5:30 p.m.	vs No. 11 Vanderbilt	No. 15	Lindsey Nelson Stadium; Knoxville, Tennessee	**W 3–2**	**Liam Doyle** (9–2)	JD Thompson (4–5)	**Nate Snead** (5)	SECN	5,923	39–11	15–10
May 10th 5:00 p.m.	vs No. 11 Vanderbilt	No. 15	Lindsey Nelson Stadium; Knoxville, Tennessee	**L 6–10**	Luke Guth (1–0)	**Marcus Phillips** (3–4)	None	ESPN2	6,329	39–12	15–11
May 11th 3:00 p.m.	vs No. 11 Vanderbilt	No. 15	Lindsey Nelson Stadium; Knoxville, Tennessee	**L 5–7**	Luke Guth (2–0)	**Tanner Franklin** (1–2)	Ethan McElvain (1)	ESPN2	6,070	39–13	15–12
May 13th 5:00 p.m.	vs Belmont*	No. 17	Lindsey Nelson Stadium; Knoxville, Tennessee	**W 9–4**	**Thomas Crabtree** (2–0)	Lake Morris (1–2)	None	SECN+	5,263	40–13	—
May 15th 7:30 p.m.	at No. 8 Arkansas	No. 17	Baum-Walker Stadium; Fayetteville, Arkansas	**W 10–7**	**AJ Russell** (1–1)	Zach Root (6–4)	None	ESPN2	10,693	41–13	16–12
May 16th 7:30 p.m.	at No. 8 Arkansas	No. 17	Baum-Walker Stadium; Fayetteville, Arkansas	**L 6–8**	Cole Gibler (2–1)	**Liam Doyle** (9–3)	Christian Foutch (4)	SECN+	10,925	41–14	16–13
May 17th 3:00 p.m.	at No. 8 Arkansas	No. 17	Baum-Walker Stadium; Fayetteville, Arkansas	**L 4–8**	Gage Wood (2–1)	**Tegan Kuhns** (2–3)	Will McEntire (2)	SECN	10,925	41–15	16–14

Postseason (5–3)
SEC Tournament (2–1)

Date	Opponent	Rank	Site/stadium	Score	Win	Loss	Save	TV	Attendance	Overall record	Tournament record
May 21st 2 p.m.	vs (9) No. 23 Alabama	(8) No. 21	Hoover Metropolitan Stadium; Hoover, Alabama	**W 15–10**	**AJ Russell** (2–1)	Zane Adams (7–4)	JT Blackwood (1)	SECN	11,117	42–15	1–0
May 22nd 4 p.m.	vs (1) No. 2 Texas	(8) No. 21	Hoover Metropolitan Stadium; Hoover, Alabama	**W 7–5** (12)	**Nate Snead** (4–1)	Dylan Volantis (4–1)	None	SECN	10,135	43–15	2–0
May 24th 11 a.m.	vs (4) No. 9 Vanderbilt	(8) No. 21	Hoover Metropolitan Stadium; Hoover, Alabama	**L 0–10** (7)	Cody Bowker (3–4)	**Tegan Kuhns** (2–4)	Fennell (1)	SECN	14,775	43–16	2–1

Knoxville Regional (3–1)

Date	Opponent	Rank	Site/stadium	Score	Win	Loss	Save	TV	Attendance	Overall record	NCAA record
May 30th 6 p.m.	vs (4) Miami (OH)	(1) No. 16	Lindsey Nelson Stadium; Knoxville, Tennessee	**W 9–2**	**Liam Doyle** (10–3)	Katskee Cooper (11–2)	None	ESPN+	5,969	44–16	1–0
May 31st 6 p.m.	vs (3) Cincinnati	(1) No. 16	Lindsey Nelson Stadium; Knoxville, Tennessee	**W 10–6**	**Marcus Phillips** (4–4)	Kellen O'Connor (3–3)	**Brandon Arvidson** (1)	ESPN2	6,235	45–16	2–0
June 1st 6 p.m.	vs (2) Wake Forest	(1) No. 16	Lindsey Nelson Stadium; Knoxville, Tennessee	**L 6–7**	Leffew Haiden (4–1)	**Nate Snead** (4–2)	None	ESPN+	6,015	45–17	2–1
June 2nd 6 p.m.	vs (2) Wake Forest	(1) No. 16	Lindsey Nelson Stadium; Knoxville, Tennessee	**W 11–5**	**Brayden Krenzel** (3–0)	Zach Johnston (2–2)	**Liam Doyle** (1)	ESPN2	6,198	46–17	3–1

Fayetteville Super Regional (0–2)

Date	Opponent	Rank	Site/stadium	Score	Win	Loss	Save	TV	Attendance	Overall record	NCAA record
June 7th 5 p.m.	vs (3) Arkansas	(1) No. 16	Baum–Walker Stadium; Fayetteville, Arkansas	**L** 3–4	Zach Root (8–5)	**Marcus Phillips** (4–5)	Gabe Gaeckle (2)	ESPN	10,205	46–18	3–2
June 8th 3 p.m.	vs (3) Arkansas	(1) No. 16	Baum–Walker Stadium; Fayetteville, Arkansas	**L** 4–11	Cole Gibler (3–1)	**Liam Doyle** (10–4)	None	ESPN	10,273	46–19	3–3

Legend: = Win = Loss = Canceled Bold = Tennessee team member
*Denotes non–conference game • Schedule source • Rankings based on the teams' current ranking in the ESPN/USA Today Coaches Poll • (#) Tournament seedings in parentheses.

== Record vs. conference opponents ==
Blank are not scheduled. Blue are home games, otherwise away.

2025 SEC baseball records Source: 2025 SEC baseball game results, 2025 SEC baseball schedule
Tm	W–L	ALA	ARK	AUB	FLA	UGA	KEN	LSU	MSU	MIZ	OKL	OMS	SCA	TEN	TEX	TAM	VAN	Tm	SR	SW
ALA	16–14		.	1–2	1–2	2–1	.	1–2	1–2	3–0	2–1	.	.	1–2	.	3–0	1–2	ALA	4–6	2–0
ARK	20–10	.		.	1–2	1–2	.	1–2	.	3–0	.	2–1	3–0	2–1	3–0	1–2	3–0	ARK	6–4	4–0
AUB	17–13	2–1	.		.	0–3	2–1	3–0	2–1	.	.	1–2	3–0	2–1	0–3	.	2–1	AUB	7–3	2–2
FLA	15–15	2–1	2–1	.		0–3	.	.	2–1	3–0	.	1–2	3–0	0–3	2–1	.	0–3	FLA	6–4	2–3
UGA	18–12	1–2	2–1	3–0	3–0		2–1	.	.	3–0	2–1	.	.	.	0–3	2–1	0–3	UGA	7–3	3–2
KEN	13–17	.	.	1–2	.	1–2		.	0–3	.	3–0	1–2	2–1	2–1	1–2	2–1	0–3	KEN	4–6	1–2
LSU	19–11	2–1	2–1	0–3	.	.	.		3–0	3–0	3–0	.	2–1	2–1	1–2	1–2	.	LSU	7–3	3–1
MSU	15–15	2–1	.	1–2	1–2	.	3–0	0–3		3–0	1–2	2–1	2–1	.	0–3	.	.	MSU	5–5	2–2
MIZ	3–27	0–3	0–3	.	0–3	0–3	.	0–3	0–3		0–3	0–3	.	.	0–3	3–0	.	MIZ	1–9	1–9
OKL	14–16	1–2	.	.	.	1–2	0–3	0–3	2–1	3–0		2–1	2–1	.	1–2	.	2–1	OKL	5–5	1–2
OMS	16–14	.	1–2	2–1	2–1	.	2–1	.	1–2	3–0	1–2		1–2	1–2	.	.	2–1	OMS	5–5	1–0
SCA	6–24	.	0–3	0–3	0–3	.	1–2	1–2	1–2	.	1–2	2–1		0–3	.	0–3	.	SCA	1–9	0–5
TEN	16–14	2–1	1–2	1–2	3–0	.	1–2	1–2	.	.	.	2–1	3–0		.	1–2	1–2	TEN	4–6	2–0
TEX	22–8	.	0–3	3–0	1–2	3–0	2–1	2–1	3–0	3–0	2–1	.	.	.		3–0	.	TEX	8–2	5–1
TAM	11–19	0–3	2–1	.	.	1–2	1–2	2–1	.	0–3	.	.	3–0	2–1	0–3		0–3	TAM	4–6	1–4
VAN	19–11	2–1	0–3	1–2	3–0	3–0	3–0	.	.	.	1–2	1–2	.	2–1	.	3–0		VAN	6–4	4–1
Tm	W–L	ALA	ARK	AUB	FLA	UGA	KEN	LSU	MSU	MIZ	OKL	OMS	SCA	TEN	TEX	TAM	VAN	Team	SR	SW

Updated for entire regular season.
Tie brkrs: LSU>VAN ARK common, OMS>TEN & OMS>ALA VAN common, TEN>ALA hd to hd, FLA>MSU hd to hd.
