= 2026 Tennessee Volunteers baseball team =

American college baseball team

2026 Tennessee Volunteers baseball

NCAA Chapel Hill Regional, 0–2
- Conference: Southeastern Conference
- Record: 38–22 (15–15 SEC)
- Head coach: Josh Elander (1st season)
- Assistant coaches: Chuck Jeroloman; Ross Kivett; Josh Reynolds
- Home stadium: Lindsey Nelson Stadium

2026 Southeastern Conference baseball standings
	Conf.				Overall
Team	W		L	PCT	W		L	PCT
No. 3 Georgia ‍†‍‡‍^{y}	23	–	7	.767	53	–	14	.791
No. 5 Texas ‍‍‍^{y}	19	–	10	.655	46	–	15	.754
No. 17 Texas A&M ‍‍‍^{y}	18	–	11	.621	41	–	16	.719
No. 6 Alabama ‍‍‍^{y}	18	–	12	.600	42	–	21	.667
No. 16 Florida ‍‍‍^{y}	18	–	12	.600	41	–	21	.661
No. 9 Auburn ‍‍‍^{y}	17	–	13	.567	42	–	22	.656
No. 23 Arkansas ‍‍‍^{y}	17	–	13	.567	41	–	22	.651
No. 14 Mississippi State ‍‍‍^{y}	16	–	14	.533	43	–	19	.694
No. 7 Ole Miss ‍‍‍^{y}	15	–	15	.500	41	–	23	.641
Tennessee ‍‍‍^{y}	15	–	15	.500	38	–	22	.633
No. 1 Oklahoma ‍‍‍^{y}	14	–	16	.467	43	–	23	.652
Vanderbilt ‍‍‍	14	–	16	.467	33	–	25	.569
Kentucky ‍‍‍^{y}	13	–	17	.433	33	–	23	.589
LSU ‍‍‍	9	–	21	.300	30	–	28	.517
South Carolina ‍‍‍	7	–	23	.233	22	–	35	.386
Missouri ‍‍‍	6	–	24	.200	24	–	31	.436
† – Conference champion ‡ – Tournament champion y – Invited to the NCAA Tournament; As of June 22, 2026; Rankings from D1Baseball

The 2026 Tennessee Volunteers baseball team represented the University of Tennessee in the 2026 NCAA Division I baseball season. The Volunteers played their home games at Lindsey Nelson Stadium and were led by first-year head coach Josh Elander.

== Previous season ==
The Volunteers finished 46–19 and 16–14 in the SEC, finishing 8th in the conference. They won the Knoxville Regional but their postseason run ended in the Fayetteville Super Regional.

== Preseason ==
=== Preseason SEC awards and honors ===
The Vols had three players named to SEC preseason teams:

Preseason All-SEC First Team
Player	No.	Position	Class
Henry Ford	9	OF	Junior
Brandon Arvidson	25	RP	Junior

Preseason All-SEC Second Team
Player	No.	Position	Class
Levi Clark	16	1B	Sophomore

=== SEC coaches poll ===
The SEC Coaches poll was released on February 5, 2026. Tennessee was predicted to finish sixth in the SEC.

SEC coaches poll
Predicted finish	Team	Votes (1st place)
1	LSU	231 (9)
2	Texas	214 (1)
3	Mississippi State	205 (4)
4	Arkansas	203 (2)
5	Auburn	175
6	Tennessee	162
7	Florida	156
8	Vanderbilt	151
9	Georgia	133
10	Ole Miss	110
11	Kentucky	99
12	Alabama	87
13	Texas A&M	86
14	Oklahoma	84
15	South Carolina	49
16	Missouri	31

== Personnel ==
=== Roster ===
2026 Tennessee Volunteers baseball team
Players
Coaches

#	Pos.	Name	B/T	Height	Weight	Year	Home town
1	OF	Blaine Brown	L/L	6 ft 5 in (1.96 m)	207 lb (94 kg)	So	Houston, TX
2	INF	Ariel Antigua	R/R	5 ft 8 in (1.73 m)	185 lb (84 kg)	Jr	West Palm Beach, FL
4	INF	Manny Marin	R/R	6 ft 1 in (1.85 m)	184 lb (83 kg)	So	Hialeah, FL
5	C	Garrett Wright	R/R	6 ft 0 in (1.83 m)	193 lb (88 kg)	Jr	Massillon, OH
6	RHP	Brady Frederick	R/R	5 ft 11 in (1.8 m)	200 lb (91 kg)	Jr	Knoxville, TN
7	LHP	Mark Hindy	L/L	6 ft 4 in (1.93 m)	230 lb (104 kg)	Gr	Essex Fells, NJ
8	UTL	Jay Abernathy	L/R	5 ft 10 in (1.78 m)	188 lb (85 kg)	So	Acworth, GA
9	UTL	Henry Ford	R/R	6 ft 5 in (1.96 m)	225 lb (102 kg)	Jr	Charlottesville, VA
11	LHP	Evan Blanco	L/L	6 ft 0 in (1.83 m)	210 lb (95 kg)	Sr	Woburn, MA
12	LHP	Evan Hankins	L/L	6 ft 5 in (1.96 m)	228 lb (103 kg)	Fr	Bristol, VA
13	OF	Reese Chapman	L/R	6 ft 1 in (1.85 m)	225 lb (102 kg)	Sr	Parker, CO
14	UTL	Blake Grimmer	L/R	6 ft 3 in (1.91 m)	208 lb (94 kg)	RS So	Spring Lake, MI
15	UTL	Hunter High	L/R	6 ft 0 in (1.83 m)	205 lb (93 kg)	Jr	Nashville, TN
16	UTL	Levi Clark	R/R	6 ft 1 in (1.85 m)	217 lb (98 kg)	So	Marietta, GA
17	OF	Nate Eisfelder	R/R	6 ft 2 in (1.88 m)	216 lb (98 kg)	Fr	Johnson City, TN
18	RHP	Landon Mack	S/R	6 ft 1 in (1.85 m)	212 lb (96 kg)	So	Columbus, NJ
19	LHP	Cam Appenzeller	L/L	6 ft 5 in (1.96 m)	195 lb (88 kg)	Fr	Chatham, IL
20	UTL	Tyler Myatt	R/R	6 ft 0 in (1.83 m)	205 lb (93 kg)	RS So	Tazewell, TN
21	RHP	Tegan Kuhns	S/R	6 ft 3 in (1.91 m)	193 lb (88 kg)	So	Gettysburg, PA
25	LHP	Brandon Arvidson	R/L	6 ft 5 in (1.96 m)	217 lb (98 kg)	RS Jr	Dripping Springs, TX
26	UTL	Chris Newstrom	R/R	6 ft 2 in (1.88 m)	212 lb (96 kg)	So	Scottsdale, AZ
27	C	Stone Lawless	R/R	6 ft 2 in (1.88 m)	222 lb (101 kg)	RS So	Huntsville, AL
28	UTL	Hutson Chance	L/R	6 ft 3 in (1.91 m)	215 lb (98 kg)	Fr	Brentwood, TN
29	LHP	Taylor Tracey	R/L	6 ft 6 in (1.98 m)	205 lb (93 kg)	Fr	Austin, TX
30	C	Trent Grindlinger	R/R	6 ft 3 in (1.91 m)	211 lb (96 kg)	Fr	Huntington Beach, CA
31	INF	Finley Bates	R/R	5 ft 10 in (1.78 m)	180 lb (82 kg)	Jr	Castle Rock, CO
32	INF	Ethan Moore	S/R	6 ft 0 in (1.83 m)	203 lb (92 kg)	Fr	River Forest, IL
33	RHP	Bo Rhudy	R/R	6 ft 4 in (1.93 m)	230 lb (104 kg)	Jr	Chickamauga, GA
34	RHP	Brayden Krenzel	R/R	6 ft 3 in (1.91 m)	226 lb (103 kg)	So	Dublin, OH
35	C	Cash Williams	R/R	6 ft 1 in (1.85 m)	201 lb (91 kg)	Fr	Choctaw, OK
36	LHP	Sawyer Deering	R/R	6 ft 0 in (1.83 m)	198 lb (90 kg)	Fr	Kimberly, WI
37	RHP	Ari Bethea	R/R	6 ft 0 in (1.83 m)	206 lb (93 kg)	Fr	Collierville, TN
38	RHP	Ethan Baiotto	R/R	6 ft 3 in (1.91 m)	216 lb (98 kg)	Fr	Southlake, TX
40	LHP	Jackson Estes	L/L	6 ft 3 in (1.91 m)	220 lb (100 kg)	Fr	North Little Rock, AR
42	LHP	Will Haas	L/L	6 ft 1 in (1.85 m)	200 lb (91 kg)	Fr	Rockford, MN
44	RHP	Nic Abraham	L/R	6 ft 5 in (1.96 m)	218 lb (99 kg)	So	Elk Grove, CA
46	RHP	Jax Bishop	R/R	6 ft 2 in (1.88 m)	180 lb (82 kg)	Fr	Rome, GA
48	LHP	Chandler Day	L/L	6 ft 2 in (1.88 m)	212 lb (96 kg)	Fr	Germantown, TN
50	RHP	DJ McDowell	R/R	6 ft 5 in (1.96 m)	196 lb (89 kg)	Fr	Atlanta, GA

Head coach

Josh Elander

Assistant coach(es)

Chuck Jeroloman
Ross Kivett
Josh Reynolds

Legend

- (C) Team captain
- (S) Suspended
- (I) Ineligible
- Injured
- Current redshirt

Roster
Last update: May 27, 2026

=== Coaching staff ===
2026 Tennessee Volunteers coaching staff
Name	Position	Seasons at Tennessee
Josh Elander	Head coach	9
Chuck Jeroloman	Head Assistant Coach	1
Ross Kivett	Assistant Coach/Recruiting Coordinator	2
Josh Reynolds	Assistant Coach	2
Craig Bell	Director of Program Development	1
Parker Serrano	Student Assistant Coach	3
Keegan Knoll	Director of Baseball Sports Performance	1
Ricky Martinez	Director of Recruiting	2

== Offseason ==
=== Signing Day Recruits ===
The following players signed National Letter of Intents to play for Tennessee in 2026.

Player	Hometown	High School
Pitchers
Cam Appenzeller	Chatham, Illinois	Glenwood (IL)
Taylor Tracey	Austin, Texas	Dripping Springs
Ethan Baiotto	Southlake, Texas	Southlake Carroll
Will Haas	Rockford, Minnesota	Rockford (MN)
DJ McDowell	Atlanta, Georgia	Lassiter
Jax Bishop	Rome, Georgia	Baylor School
Sawyer Deering	Kimberly, Wisconsin	Kimberly (WI)
Chandler Day	Germantown, Tennessee	Houston (TN)
Jackson Estes	North Little Rock, Arkansas	North Little Rock
Ari Bethea	Collierville, Tennessee	Collierville
Hitters
Trent Grindlinger	Huntington Beach, California	Huntington Beach
Ethan Moore	River Forest, Illinois	Oak Park & River Forest
Nate Eisfelder	Johnson City, Tennessee	IMG Academy
Evan Hankins	Bristol, Virginia	Miller School of Albemarle
Utility
Cash Williams	Choctaw, Oklahoma	Choctaw
Hutson Chance	Brentwood, Tennessee	Christ Presbyterian Academy

=== 2025 MLB draft ===
Round	Pick	Player	Position	MLB Team
#1	#5	Liam Doyle	LHP	St. Louis Cardinals
#1	#13	Gavin Kilen	SS	San Francisco Giants
#1	#20	Andrew Fischer	3B	Milwaukee Brewers
#1	#33	Marcus Phillips	RHP	Boston Red Sox
#2	#52	AJ Russell	RHP	Texas Rangers
#2	#64	Dean Curley	SS	Cleveland Guardians
#2	#72	Tanner Franklin	RHP	St. Louis Cardinals
#3	#105	Nate Snead	RHP	Los Angeles Angels
#17	#522	Cannon Peebles	C	Cleveland Guardians

== Schedule and results ==
2026 Tennessee Volunteers baseball game log (38–22)
Regular season (37–19)

February (7–3)
Date	Opponent	Rank	Site/stadium	Score	Win	Loss	Save	TV	Attendance	Overall record	SEC record
February 13	Nicholls	No. 14	Lindsey Nelson Stadium; Knoxville, Tennessee	**W** 10–0 (8)	**Kuhns** (1–0)	Parache (0–1)		SECN+	6,977	1–0	—
February 14 (DH-1)	Nicholls	No. 14	Lindsey Nelson Stadium	**W** 5–1	**Mack** (1–0)	Mabry (0–1)		SECN+	6,515	2–0	—
February 14 (DH-2)	Nicholls	No. 14	Lindsey Nelson Stadium	**W** 12–2 (7)	**Blanco** (1–0)	Luke (0–1)		SECN+	5,667	3–0	—
February 17	UNC Asheville	No. 13	Lindsey Nelson Stadium	**W** 10–3	**Appenzeller** (1–0)	Melton (0–1)		SECN+	5,685	4–0	—
February 20	Kent State	No. 13	Lindsey Nelson Stadium	**W** 4–3	**Frederick** (1–0)	Leonard (0–1)		SECN+	6,267	5–0	—
February 21	Kent State	No. 13	Lindsey Nelson Stadium	**L** 1–2	Guidas (1–0)	**Mack** (1–1)	Williams (1)	SECN+	7,001	5–1	—
February 22	Kent State	No. 13	Lindsey Nelson Stadium	**L** 5–9	Holewinski (1–0)	**Blanco** (0–1)		SECN+	5,626	5–2	—
February 24	Bellarmine	No. 20	Lindsey Nelson Stadium	**W** 8–3	**Appenzeller** (2–0)	Oak (0–1)		SECN+	5,271	6–2	—
Amegy Bank College Baseball Series
February 27	vs. No. 1 UCLA	No. 20	Globe Life Field; Arlington, Texas	**L** 5–12	Reddeman (3–0)	**Kuhns** (1–1)		FloSports		6–3	—
February 28	vs. Arizona State	No. 20	Globe Life Field	**W** 5–3	**Mack** (2–1)	Linder (0–1)	**Appenzeller** (1)	FloSports	13,097	7–3	—

March (12–7)
Date	Opponent	Rank	Site/stadium	Score	Win	Loss	Save	TV	Attendance	Overall record	SEC record
March 1	vs. Virginia Tech	No. 20	Globe Life Field	**W** 3–1	**Hindy** (1–0)	Grim (0–1)	**Krenzel** (1)	FloSports	—	8–3	—
March 3	East Tennessee State	No. 19	Lindsey Nelson Stadium	**W** 7–1	**Frederick** (2–0)	Curless (0–1)		SECN+	6,028	9–3	—
March 4	Oakland	No. 19	Lindsey Nelson Stadium	**W** 11–2	**Abraham** (1–0)	Hansen (0–2)		SECN+	5,727	10–3	—
March 6	Wright State	No. 19	Lindsey Nelson Stadium	**W** 4–3	**Frederick** (3–0)	Thompson (1–1)		SECN+	6,479	11–3	—
March 7	Wright State	No. 19	Lindsey Nelson Stadium	**W** 5–4	**Mack** (3–1)	Paige (0–3)	**Krenzel** (2)	SECN+	6,587	12–3	—
March 8	Wright State	No. 19	Lindsey Nelson Stadium	**L** 0–6	Lax (4–0)	**Blanco** (1–2)		SECN+	5,810	12–4	—
March 10	Tennessee Tech	No. 19	Lindsey Nelson Stadium	**W** 20–2 (8)	**Baiotto** (1–0)	Strickland (0–1)		SECN+	6,102	13–4	—
March 13	at No. 8 Georgia	No. 19	Foley Field; Athens, Georgia	**W** 7–4	**Arvidson** (1–0)	Byrd (0–1)		SECN+	3,107	14–4	1–0
March 14	at No. 8 Georgia	No. 19	Foley Field	**L** 2–4	Farley (2–0)	**Mack** (3–2)	Aoki (2)	SEC Network	3,330	14–5	1–1
March 15	at No. 8 Georgia	No. 19	Foley Field	**L** 7–8	Scott (3–0)	**Krenzel** (0–1)	**Byrd** (2)	SECN+	3,039	14–6	1–2
March 17	Eastern Kentucky	No. 22	Lindsey Nelson Stadium	**W** 10–3	**Frederick** (4–0)	Stockham (0–2)		SECN+	5,647	15–6	—
March 20	Missouri	No. 22	Lindsey Nelson Stadium	**L** 4–8	Dohrmann (2–1)	**Kuhns** (1–2)	Rosand (2)	SECN+	6,359	15–7	1–3
March 21	Missouri	No. 22	Lindsey Nelson Stadium	**W** 4–2	**Appenzeller** (3–0)	McDevitt (3–1)	**Rhudy** (1)	SECN+	6,826	16–7	2–3
March 22	Missouri	No. 22	Lindsey Nelson Stadium	**W** 7–1	**Blanco** (2–2)	Kehlenbrink (3–2)		SECN+	6,132	17–7	3–3
March 24	USC Upstate	No. 21	Lindsey Nelson Stadium	**W** 4–2	**Krenzel** (1–1)	Mackey (0–2)		SECN+	5,977	18–7	—
March 27	at Vanderbilt	No. 21	Hawkins Field; Nashville, Tennessee	**L** 2–3 (10)	Seiber (3–1)	**Kuhns** (1–3)		ESPNU	3,442	18–8	3–4
March 28	at Vanderbilt	No. 21	Hawkins Field	**L** 5–6 (16)	Taylor (1–3)	**Frederick** (4–1)		SEC Network	3,442	18–9	3–5
March 29	at Vanderbilt	No. 21	Hawkins Field	**L** 15–16	Seiber (4–1)	**Krenzel** (1–2)		ESPN2	3,442	18–10	3–6
March 31	Austin Peay		Lindsey Nelson Stadium	**W** 13–4	**Hindy** (2–0)	Cox (0–4)	None	SECN+	6,647	19–10	—

April (11–5)
Date	Opponent	Rank	Site/stadium	Score	Win	Loss	Save	TV	Attendance	Overall record	SEC record
April 3	LSU		Lindsey Nelson Stadium	**L** 5–7	Garcia (1–0)	**Rhudy** (0–1)	Sheerin (2)	SEC Network	7,195	19–11	3–7
April 4	LSU		Lindsey Nelson Stadium	**W** 4–1	**Appenzeller** (4–0)	Schmidt (4–2)	None	ESPN2	7,259	20–11	4–7
April 5	LSU		Lindsey Nelson Stadium	**L** 6–16 (12)	Guidry (4–3)	**Krenzel** (1–3)	None	SECN+	6,308	20–12	4–8
April 7	Northern Kentucky		Lindsey Nelson Stadium	**W** 12–6	**Rhudy** (1–1)	Wentz (0–2)	None	SECN+	5,814	21–12	—
April 10	at No. 9 Mississippi State		Dudy Noble Field, Polk–DeMent Stadium; Starkville, Mississippi	**W** 6–5	**Appenzeller** (5–0)	Pitzer (0–2)	None	SECN+	13,543	22–12	5–8
April 11	at No. 9 Mississippi State		Dudy Noble Field, Polk–DeMent Stadium	**W** 6–2	**Kuhns** (2–3)	Stone (5–1)	**Arvidson** (1)	SECN+	14,814	23–12	6–8
April 12	at No. 9 Mississippi State		Dudy Noble Field, Polk–DeMent Stadium	**W** 7–2	**Blanco** (3–2)	Foster (1–1)	**Rhudy** (2)	SECN+	10,376	24–12	7–8
April 14	UNC Asheville		Lindsey Nelson Stadium	**W** 11–1 (8)	**Tracey** (1–0)	Crum (0–3)	None	SECN+	5,798	25–12	—
April 17	No. 25 Ole Miss		Lindsey Nelson Stadium	**L** 4–7	Elliott (4–1)	**Mack** (3–3)	Hooks (3)	SECN+	7,065	25–13	7–9
April 18	No. 25 Ole Miss		Lindsey Nelson Stadium	**L** 1–8	Townsend (4–1)	**Appenzeller** (5–1)	Hooks (4)	SECN+	7,430	25–14	7–10
April 19	No. 25 Ole Miss		Lindsey Nelson Stadium	**W** 13–5	**Blanco** (4–2)	Rabe (3–2)	None	SECN+	6,263	26–14	8–10
April 21	Lipscomb		Lindsey Nelson Stadium	**W** 14–4 (7)	**Baiotto** (2–0)	Martin Jr. (1–3)	None	SECN+	6,146	27–14	—
April 23	No. 13 Alabama		Lindsey Nelson Stadium	**L** 8–12	Fay (7–3)	**Mack** (3–4)	None	ESPN2	6,485	27–15	8–11
April 24 (DH-1)	No. 13 Alabama		Lindsey Nelson Stadium	**W** 10–0 (8)	**Kuhns** (3–3)	Adams (4–3)	None	SECN+	6,391	28–15	9–11
April 24 (DH-2)	No. 13 Alabama		Lindsey Nelson Stadium	**W** 11–4	**Blanco** (5–2)	Upchurch (5–3)	None	SECN+	7,051	29–15	10–11
April 28	West Georgia		Lindsey Nelson Stadium	**W** 13–0 (7)	**Krenzel** (2–3)	Quiles (0–2)	None	SECN+	5,916	30–15	—

May (7–4)
Date	Opponent	Rank	Site/stadium	Score	Win	Loss	Save	TV	Attendance	Overall record	SEC record
May 1	at Kentucky		Kentucky Proud Park; Lexington, Kentucky	**L** 2–9	Cleaver (2–3)	**Kuhns** (3–4)	None	SECN+	4,660	30–16	10–12
May 2	at Kentucky		Kentucky Proud Park	**L** 2–12 (8)	Jelkin (7–2)	**Blanco** (5–3)	None	SECN+	4,565	30–17	10–13
May 3	at Kentucky		Kentucky Proud Park	**W** 10–9	**Mack** (4–4)	Mattison (2–2)	**Arvidson** (2)	SECN+	3,959	31–17	11–13
May 5	Presbyterian		Lindsey Nelson Stadium	**W** 8–1	**Baiotto** (3–0)	Vann (0–1)	None	SECN+	5,622	32–17	—
May 8	No. 4 Texas		Lindsey Nelson Stadium	**W** 5–1	**Kuhns** (4–4)	Volantis (7–1)	None	SECN+	6,842	33–17	12–13
May 9	No. 4 Texas		Lindsey Nelson Stadium	**W** 14–9	**Blanco** (6–3)	Harrison (5–3)	None	SECN+	6,842	34–17	13–13
May 10	No. 4 Texas		Lindsey Nelson Stadium	**L** 6–13	Leffew (4–1)	**Day** (0–1)	None	ESPN2		34–18	13–14
May 12	Belmont		Lindsey Nelson Stadium	**W** 11–1 (8)	**Abraham** (2–0)	Kenyon (0–2)	None	SECN+	6,244	35–18	—
May 14	vs. Oklahoma		Chickasaw Bricktown Ballpark; Oklahoma City, Oklahoma	**W** 9–7	**Kuhns** (5–4)	Wesloski (0–1)	**Rhudy** (3)	SECN+	3,175	36–18	14–14
May 15 (Note: Game was suspended due to lightning and completed on May 16.)	vs. Oklahoma		Chickasaw Bricktown Ballpark	**W** 9–4	**Blanco** (7–3)	X. Mercurius (0–1)	**Arvidson** (3)	SECN+	3,588	37–18	15–14
May 16	vs. Oklahoma		Chickasaw Bricktown Ballpark	**L** 9–12	Bodin (5–1)	**Day** (0–2)	Cleveland (8)	SECN+	3,568	37–19	15–15

Postseason (1–3)

SEC Tournament (1–1)
Date	Opponent	Seed	Site/stadium	Score	Win	Loss	Save	TV	Attendance	Overall record	SECT Record
May 19	vs. (15) South Carolina	(10) No. 23	Hoover Metropolitan Stadium; Hoover, AL	**W** 11–6	**Appenzeller** (6–1)	Stone (5–5)	**Haas** (1)	SECN	7,627	38–19	1–0
May 20	vs. (7) No. 12 Arkansas	(10) No. 23	Hoover Metropolitan Stadium	**L** 4–8	Gibler (5–2)	**Blanco** (7–4)	None	SECN	14,461	38–20	1–1

NCAA tournament: Chapel Hill Regional (0–2)
Date	Opponent	Seed	Site/stadium	Score	Win	Loss	Save	TV	Attendance	Overall record	Regional record
May 29	vs. (3) East Carolina	(2) No. 23	Boshamer Stadium; Chapel Hill, NC	**L** 3–7 (14)	Antolick (3–2)	**Haas** (0–1)	None	ESPNU	3,781	38–21	0–1
May 30	vs. (4) VCU	(2) No. 23	Boshamer Stadium	**L** 4–5	Holbert (4–1)	**Kuhns** (5–5)	Peters (7)	ESPN	3,715	38–22	0–2

- Win
- Loss
- Postponement or cancellation
- Bold: Tennessee player
- Rankings from D1Baseball.com.
- (#) Tournament seedings in parentheses.

Schedule Notes:

== Record vs. conference opponents ==
Blank are not scheduled. Blue are home games, otherwise away.

2026 SEC baseball records Source: 2026 SEC baseball game results, 2026 SEC baseball schedule
Tm	W–L	ALA	ARK	AUB	FLA	UGA	KEN	LSU	MSU	MIZ	OKL	OMS	SCA	TEN	TEX	TAM	VAN	Tm	SR	SW
ALA	18–12		0–3	3–0	3–0	.	0–3	.	.	.	2–1	2–1	3–0	1–2	1–2	.	3–0	ALA	6–4	4–2
ARK	17–13	3–0		1–2	0–3	1–2	2–1	.	2–1	2–1	2–1	2–1	2–1	.	.	.	.	ARK	7–3	1–1
AUB	17–13	0–3	2–1		2–1	1–2	2–1	.	2–1	3–0	2–1	.	.	.	1–2	2–1	.	AUB	7–3	1–1
FLA	18–12	0–3	3–0	1–2		2–1	2–1	3–0	.	.	2–1	1–2	3–0	.	.	1–2	.	FLA	6–4	3–1
UGA	23–7	.	2–1	2–1	1–2		.	3–0	3–0	3–0	.	2–1	3–0	2–1	.	2–1	.	UGA	9–1	4–0
KEN	13–17	3–0	1–2	1–2	1–2	.		1–2	.	1–2	.	1–2	1–2	2–1	.	.	1–2	KEN	2–8	1–0
LSU	9–21	.	.	.	0–3	0–3	2–1		0–3	.	1–2	0–3	3–0	2–1	.	0–3	1–2	LSU	3–7	1–5
MSU	16–14	.	1–2	1–2	.	0–3	.	3–0		.	.	3–0	3–0	0–3	1–2	1–2	3–0	MSU	4–6	4–2
MIZ	6–24	.	1–2	0–3	.	0–3	2–1	.	.		0–3	.	0–3	1–2	0–3	0–3	2–1	MIZ	2–8	0–6
OKL	14–16	1–2	1–2	1–2	1–2	.	.	2–1	.	3–0		.	.	1–2	0–3	2–1	2–1	OKL	4–6	1–1
OMS	15–15	1–2	1–2	.	2–1	1–2	2–1	3–0	0–3	.	.		.	2–1	1–2	2–1	.	OMS	5–5	1–1
SCA	7–23	0–3	1–2	.	0–3	0–3	2–1	0–3	0–3	3–0	.	.		.	1–2	.	0–3	SCA	2–8	1–6
TEN	15–15	2–1	.	.	.	1–2	1–2	1–2	3–0	2–1	2–1	1–2	.		2–1	.	0–3	TEN	5–5	1–1
TEX	19–10	2–1	.	2–1	.	.	.	.	2–1	3–0	3–0	2–1	2–1	1–2		0–2	2–1	TEX	8–2	2–0
TAM	18–11	.	.	1–2	2–1	1–2	.	3–0	2–1	3–0	1–2	1–2	.	.	2–0		2–1	TAM	6–4	2–0
VAN	14–16	0–3	.	.	.	.	2–1	2–1	0–3	1–2	1–2	.	3–0	3–0	1–2	1–2		VAN	4–6	2–2
Tm	W–L	ALA	ARK	AUB	FLA	UGA	KEN	LSU	MSU	MIZ	OKL	OMS	SCA	TEN	TEX	TAM	VAN	Team	SR	SW

Updated for entire regular season. Texas at Texas A&M, one game cancelled.
Tie breakers: ALA>FLA hd to hd, AUB>ARK hd to hd, OMS>TEN hd to hd, OKL>VAN hd to hd.

== Rankings ==
Ranking movements Legend: ██ Increase in ranking ██ Decrease in ranking — = Not ranked RV = Received votes
	Week																	
Poll	Pre	1	2	3	4	5	6	7	8	9	10	11	12	13	14	15	16	Final
Coaches'	15	15*	19	19	21	23	21	RV	—	RV	—	RV	—	RV	25	25	25*	RV
Baseball America	13	13	19	19	21	23	20	—	—	—	—	24	—	24	20	20*	20*	25
NCBWA†	15	12	20	19	24	RV	23	RV	RV	RV	RV	RV	RV	RV	24	24*	RV	RV
D1Baseball	14	13	20	19	19	22	21	—	—	—	—	—	—	—	23	23	23*	—
Perfect Game	3	3	13	17	19	21	21	—	—	—	—	—	—	—	25	25*	25*	25

† NCBWA ranks 30 teams in their preseason poll, but only ranks 25 teams weekly during the season.
* A new poll was not released for this week, so for comparison purposes, the previous week's ranking is inserted in this week's slot.
