= 2024 Tennessee Volunteers baseball team =

College Baseball Season

2024 Tennessee Volunteers baseball

SEC Eastern Division champion SEC regular season champions SEC tournament champions NCAA Knoxville Regional champion NCAA Knoxville Super Regional champion

College World Series National champions
- Conference: Southeastern Conference
- Eastern Division

Ranking
- Coaches: No. 1
- Record: 60–13 (22–8 SEC)
- Head coach: Tony Vitello (7th season)
- Assistant coaches: Frank Anderson; Josh Elander
- Home stadium: Lindsey Nelson Stadium

Uniform
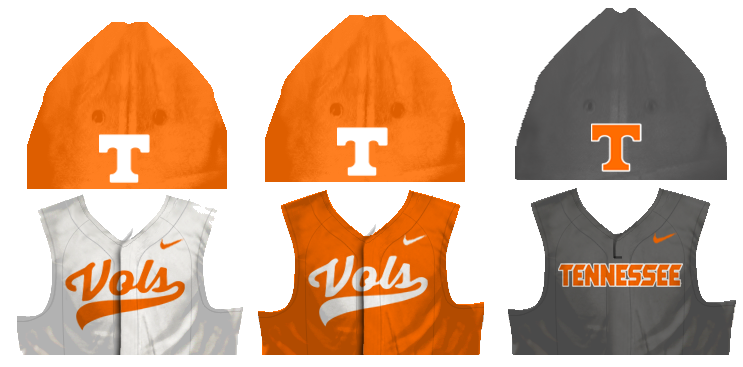

2024 Southeastern Conference baseball standings
	Conf.				Overall
Team	W		L	PCT	W		L	PCT
Eastern
No. 1 Tennessee ^{x}‍†‍‡‍^{y}	22	–	8	.733	60	–	13	.822
No. 3 Kentucky ^{x}‍†‍‍^{y}	22	–	8	.733	46	–	16	.742
No. 11 Georgia ‍‍‍^{y}	17	–	13	.567	43	–	17	.717
Vanderbilt ‍‍‍^{y}	13	–	17	.433	38	–	23	.623
No. 8 Florida ‍‍‍^{y}	13	–	17	.433	36	–	30	.545
South Carolina ‍‍‍^{y}	13	–	17	.433	37	–	25	.597
Missouri ‍‍‍	9	–	21	.300	23	–	32	.418
Western
No. 17 Arkansas ^{x}‍‍‍^{y}	20	–	10	.667	44	–	16	.733
No. 2 Texas A&M ‍‍‍^{y}	19	–	11	.633	53	–	15	.779
No. 22 Mississippi State ‍‍‍^{y}	17	–	13	.567	40	–	23	.635
Alabama ‍‍‍^{y}	13	–	17	.433	33	–	24	.579
LSU ‍‍‍^{y}	13	–	17	.433	43	–	23	.652
Ole Miss ‍‍‍	11	–	19	.367	27	–	29	.482
Auburn ‍‍‍	8	–	22	.267	27	–	26	.509
x – Division champion † – Conference champion ‡ – Tournament champion y – Invited to the NCAA Tournament; As of June 24, 2024; Rankings from D1Baseball

The 2024 Tennessee Volunteers baseball team represented the University of Tennessee in the 2024 NCAA Division I baseball season. The Volunteers played their home games at Lindsey Nelson Stadium.

The Volunteers won the College World Series, defeating the Texas A&M Aggies in the championship series. In addition to winning the first national championship in program history, Tennessee tied the NCAA record for most wins in a season (60). They were the first number one seed to win the College World Series since 1999 and the first team to win 60 games since 1989. Tennessee also became the first SEC team in history to win 60 games in a season, and the first team in college baseball history with 5 players to record 20+ home runs in a single season. Tennessee won the SEC East, the SEC regular season title, the SEC Tournament title, a regional title, and a super regional title. The Volunteers would go 5-1 in Omaha by recording wins over Florida State (2), North Carolina (1), and Texas A&M (2). The team is widely considered one of the greatest college baseball teams of all time.

== Previous season ==
The Volunteers finished 44–22, 16–14 in the SEC to finish in fourth place in the East division. They won the 2023 Clemson Regional and finished 3–0. The Vols then played Southern Mississippi in the Hattiesburg Super Regional, winning 2–1 in the three-game series. At the College World Series they went 1–2.

== Preseason ==
=== Preseason SEC awards and honors ===
The Vols had three players named to SEC preseason teams.

Preseason All-SEC First Team
Player	No.	Position	Class
Drew Beam	32	SP	Junior

Preseason All-SEC Second Team
Player	No.	Position	Class
Christian Moore	1	2B	Junior
Billy Amick	11	3B	Junior

=== Coaches poll ===
The SEC baseball coaches' poll was released on February 8, 2024. Tennessee was picked to finish second in the SEC Eastern division.

SEC East Coaches' Poll
Predicted finish	Team	Points
1	Florida	88 (11)
2	Tennessee	75 (2)
3	Vanderbilt	73 (1)
4	South Carolina	50
5	Kentucky	44
6	Georgia	36
7	Missouri	19

== Personnel ==
=== Roster ===
2024 Tennessee Volunteers baseball team
Players
Coaches

#	Pos.	Name	B/T	Height	Weight	Year	Home town
1	INF	Christian Moore	R/R	6 ft 1 in (1.85 m)	216 lb (98 kg)	Jr	Brooklyn, NY
2	INF	Ariel Antigua	R/R	5 ft 8 in (1.73 m)	184 lb (83 kg)	Fr	West Palm Beach, FL
4	INF	Alex Perry	R/R	6 ft 4 in (1.93 m)	206 lb (93 kg)	Jr	McComb, MS
5	C	Cannon Peebles	S/R	5 ft 11 in (1.8 m)	194 lb (88 kg)	So	Ashland, VA
6	INF	Bradke Lohry	R/R	5 ft 8 in (1.73 m)	171 lb (78 kg)	Jr	Trinity, FL
7	RHP	Nate Snead	R/R	6 ft 2 in (1.88 m)	212 lb (96 kg)	So	South Milwaukee, WI
8	OF	Dylan Dreiling	L/L	5 ft 11 in (1.8 m)	200 lb (91 kg)	So	Hays, KS
9	OF	Hunter Ensley	R/R	6 ft 1 in (1.85 m)	196 lb (89 kg)	RS Jr	Huntingdon, TN
10	C	Cal Stark	R/R	6 ft 1 in (1.85 m)	200 lb (91 kg)	Sr	Knoxville, TN
11	INF	Billy Amick	L/R	6 ft 1 in (1.85 m)	217 lb (98 kg)	Jr	Batesburg, SC
12		Ethan Payne	L/R	6 ft 4 in (1.93 m)	211 lb (96 kg)	Gr	Memphis, TN
13	OF	Reese Chapman	L/R	6 ft 1 in (1.85 m)	212 lb (96 kg)	So	Parker, CO
14	C	Charlie Taylor	R/R	5 ft 11 in (1.8 m)	190 lb (86 kg)	RS Jr	Dunwoody, GA
15	RHP	JJ Garcia	R/R	6 ft 6 in (1.98 m)	209 lb (95 kg)	So	Statesville, NC
16		Dalton Bargo	L/R	6 ft 1 in (1.85 m)	196 lb (89 kg)	So	Omaha, NE
17	OF	Robin Villeneuve	R/L	6 ft 1 in (1.85 m)	214 lb (97 kg)	Jr	Gatineau, Quebec
18	RHP	AJ Causey	R/R	6 ft 3 in (1.91 m)	205 lb (93 kg)	Jr	Harvest, AL
19	LHP	Andrew Behnke	L/L	5 ft 10 in (1.78 m)	181 lb (82 kg)	So	Nashville, TN
20	OF	Colby Backus	R/R	6 ft 4 in (1.93 m)	223 lb (101 kg)	RS Jr	Johnson City, TN
21	OF	Kavares Tears	L/L	6 ft 0 in (1.83 m)	200 lb (91 kg)	RS So	Lewisburg, TN
23	INF	Dean Curley	R/R	6 ft 3 in (1.91 m)	212 lb (96 kg)	Fr	La Verne, CA
25	INF	Blake Burke	L/L	6 ft 3 in (1.91 m)	236 lb (107 kg)	Jr	Brentwood, CA
27	LHP	Chris Stamos	L/L	6 ft 4 in (1.93 m)	209 lb (95 kg)	Gr	Pasadena, CA
28	RHP	Aaron Combs	R/R	6 ft 3 in (1.91 m)	203 lb (92 kg)	RS Jr	Sarasota, FL
29	RHP	Brady Robertson	R/R	6 ft 3 in (1.91 m)	199 lb (90 kg)	RS Fr	Humboldt, TN
30	C	Stone Lawless	R/R	6 ft 2 in (1.88 m)	225 lb (102 kg)	Fr	Huntsville, AL
31	RHP	Austin Hunley	R/R	6 ft 3 in (1.91 m)	196 lb (89 kg)	RS Fr	Mount Juliet, TN
32	RHP	Drew Beam	R/R	6 ft 4 in (1.93 m)	207 lb (94 kg)	Jr	Murfreesboro, TN
33	RHP	AJ Russell	R/R	6 ft 6 in (1.98 m)	207 lb (94 kg)	So	Franklin, TN
34	RHP	Derek Schaefer	R/R	6 ft 2 in (1.88 m)	206 lb (93 kg)	Fr	Cave Creek, AZ
35	LHP	Kirby Connell	S/L	5 ft 11 in (1.8 m)	196 lb (89 kg)	Gr	Johnson City, TN
36	INF	Blake Grimmer	L/R	6 ft 3 in (1.91 m)	202 lb (92 kg)	Fr	Spring Lake, MI
37	LHP	Dylan Loy	R/L	6 ft 0 in (1.83 m)	194 lb (88 kg)	Fr	Pigeon Forge, TN
40	INF	Hunter High	L/R	6 ft 0 in (1.83 m)	198 lb (90 kg)	Fr	Nashville, TN
41	INF	Camden Bates	R/R	5 ft 10 in (1.78 m)	165 lb (75 kg)	Fr	Washington, OK
43	LHP	Luke Payne	R/L	6 ft 4 in (1.93 m)	191 lb (87 kg)	Fr	Gallatin, TN
44	RHP	Marcus Phillips	R/R	6 ft 4 in (1.93 m)	250 lb (113 kg)	So	Sioux Falls, SD
45	LHP	Matthew Dallas	L/L	6 ft 5 in (1.96 m)	192 lb (87 kg)	Fr	Memphis, TN
46	LHP	Brayden Sharp	L/L	6 ft 2 in (1.88 m)	174 lb (79 kg)	Fr	The Woodlands, TX
48	LHP	Zander Sechrist	R/L	6 ft 2 in (1.88 m)	194 lb (88 kg)	Sr	Buford, GA

Head coach

Tony Vitello

Assistant coach(es)

Frank Anderson
Josh Elander
Richard Jackson

Legend

- (C) Team captain
- (S) Suspended
- (I) Ineligible
- Injured
- Current redshirt

Roster
Last update: May 26, 2024

=== Coaching staff ===
2023 Tennessee Volunteers coaching staff
Name	Position	Seasons at Tennessee
Tony Vitello	Head coach	7
Frank Anderson	Assistant Coach/Pitching	7
Josh Elander	Assistant Coach/Recruiting Coordinator	7
Richard Jackson	Assistant Coach	5
Luke Bonfield	Director of Player Development	5
Parker Serrano	Student Assistant Coach	1
Quentin Eberhardt	Director of Baseball Sports Performance	7

== Offseason ==
=== Signing Day Recruits ===
The following players signed National Letter of Intents to play for Tennessee in 2024.

Player	Hometown	High School
Pitchers
Derek Schaefer	Cave Creek, Arizona	Cactus Shadows
Dylan Loy	Pigeon Forge, Tennessee	Pigeon Forge
Luke Payne	Gallatin, Tennessee	Goodpasture Christian School
Matthew Dallas	Memphis, Tennessee	Briarcrest Christian School
Brayden Sharp	The Woodlands, Texas	The Woodlands
Hitters
Ariel Antigua	West Palm Beach, Florida	Trinity Christian Academy (FL)
Dean Curley	La Verne, California	Northview (CA)
Stone Lawless	Huntsville, Alabama	Huntsville (AL)
Blake Grimmer	Spring Lake, Michigan	St. Mary's Preparatory
Hunter High	Crieve Hall, Nashville, Tennessee	Lipscomb Academy
Camden Bates	Washington, Oklahoma	Washington (OK)

=== 2023 MLB draft ===
Round	Pick	Player	Position	MLB Team
#1	#9	Chase Dollander	RHP	Colorado Rockies
#4	#117	Maui Ahuna	SS	San Francisco Giants
#5	#146	Andrew Lindsey	RHP	Miami Marlins
#7	#202	Seth Halvorsen	RHP	Colorado Rockies
#11	#319	Jared Dickey	U	Kansas City Royals
#14	#414	Zach Joyce	RHP	Los Angeles Angels
#14	#415	Jake Fitzgibbons	LHP	Arizona Diamondbacks
#17	#516	Bryce Jenkins	RHP	New York Mets

== Schedule and results ==
2024 Tennessee Volunteers baseball game log (60-13)
Regular season (46-10)
February (8-1)

Date	Opponent	Rank	Site/stadium	Score	Win	Loss	Save	TV	Attendance	Overall record	SEC record
Shriners Children's College Showdown
February 16	vs No. 18 Texas Tech*	No. 5	Globe Life Field; Arlington, Texas	**W 6-2**	**AJ Causey (1-0)**	Bryson Thacker (0-1)	None	FloBaseball	10,992	1-0	—
February 17	vs Oklahoma*	No. 5	Globe Life Field; Arlington, Texas	**L** 1-5 10	R. Lambert (1-0)	**Aaron Combs (0-1)**	None	FloBaseball	13,991	1-1	—
February 18	vs Baylor*	No. 5	Globe Life Field; Arlington, Texas	**W 11-5**	**Nate Snead (1-0)**	Andrade (0-1)	None	FloBaseball	10,977	2-1	—
February 20	vs UNC Asheville*	No. 7	Lindsey Nelson Stadium; Knoxville, Tennessee	**W 3-2**	**Austin Hunley (1-0)**	Jacob Williams (0-1)	None	SECN+	4,699	3-1	—
February 21	vs East Tennessee State*	No. 7	Lindsey Nelson Stadium; Knoxville, Tennessee	**W 16-0** 7	**Dylan Loy (1-0)**	Derek McCarley (0-1)	None	SECN+	5,020	4-1	—
February 23	vs Albany*	No. 7	Lindsey Nelson Stadium; Knoxville, Tennessee	**W 8-5**	**Chris Stamos (1-0)**	Owen Birkman (0-1)	**AJ Causey (1)**	SECN+	4,629	5-1	—
February 24	vs Albany*	No. 7	Lindsey Nelson Stadium; Knoxville, Tennessee	**W 21-6**	**Drew Beam (1-0)**	Connor Eisenmann (0-1)	None	SECN+	5,127	6-1	—
February 25	vs Albany*	No. 7	Lindsey Nelson Standium; Knoxville, Tennessee	**W 12-0** 7	**Nate Snead (2-0)**	Quinn Thomas (0-1)	None	SECN+	5,091	7-1	—
February 27	vs High Point*	No. 7	Lindsey Nelson Stadium; Knoxville, Tennessee	**W 7-4**	**Chris Stamos (2-0)**	Dalton Olsovsky (0-2)	**Nate Snead (1)**	SECN+	4,138	8-1	—

March (16-4)

Date	Opponent	Rank	Site/stadium	Score	Win	Loss	Save	TV	Attendance	Overall record	SEC record
March 1	vs Bowling Green*	No. 7	Lindsey Nelson Stadium; Knoxville, Tennessee	**W 11-1** 8	**AJ Causey (2-0)**	DJ Newman (2-1)	None	SECN+	4,446	9-1	—
March 2	vs Bowling Green*	No. 7	Lindsey Nelson Stadium; Knoxville, Tennessee	**W 12-1** 7	**Drew Beam (2-0)**	Nic Good (0-1)	None	SECN+	5,343	10-1	—
March 3	vs Bowling Green*	No. 7	Lindsey Nelson Stadium; Knoxville, Tennessee	**W 16-6** 7	**Kirby Connell (1-0)**	Calvin Mitchell (1-2)	None	SECN+	5,385	11-1	—
March 5	vs Kansas State*	No. 7	Lindsey Nelson Stadium; Knoxville, Tennessee	**W 15-5**	**Nate Snead (3-0)**	Owen Boererna (1-1)	None	SECN+	4,467	12-1	—
March 6	vs Southern Indiana*	No. 7	Lindsey Nelson Stadium; Knoxville, Tennessee	**W 2-1**	**Derek Schaefer (1-0)**	Gavin Morris (0-1)	**Kirby Connell (1)**	SECN+	3,952	13-1	—
March 8	vs Illinois*	No. 7	Lindsey Nelson Stadium; Knoxville, Tennessee	**W 6-3**	**AJ Causey (3-0)**	Jack Crowder (0-1)	**Marcus Phillips (1)**	SECN+	5,083	14-1	—
March 9	vs Illinois*	No. 7	Lindsey Nelson Stadium; Knoxville, Tennessee	**W 24-1'**	**Drew Beam (3-0)**	Logan Tabeling (0-2)	None	SECN+	4,938	15-1	—
March 10	vs Illinois*	No. 7	Lindsey Nelson Stadium; Knoxville, Tennessee	**W 8-3**	**Nate Snead (4-0)**	Joseph Glassey (0-1)	None	SECN+	5,188	16-1	—
March 12	vs Eastern Kentucky*	No. 5	Lindsey Nelson Stadium; Knoxville, Tennessee	**W 17-2** 7	**Chris Stamos (3-0)**	Bradley Stewart (0-1)	None	SECN+	5,129	17-1	—
March 15	vs Alabama	No. 5	Sewell-Thomas Stadium; Tuscaloosa, Alabama	**W 11-3**	**AJ Causey (4-0)**	Hess (3-1)	None	SECN+	3,801	18-1	1-0
March 16	vs Alabama	No. 5	Sewell-Thomas Stadium; Tuscaloosa, Alabama	**L** 3-6	Farone (3-0)	**Drew Beam (3-1)**	None	SECN	4,619	18-2	1-1
March 17	vs Alabama	No. 5	Sewell-Thomas Stadium; Tuscaloosa, Alabama	**L** 6-7	Heiberger (2-0)	**Nate Snead (4-1)**	Moza (1)	SECN	4,563	18-3	1-2
March 19	vs Xavier*	No. 7	Lindsey Nelson Stadium; Knoxville, Tennessee	**W 10-2**	**Kirby Connell (2-0)**	Jonathan Kelly (0-1)	None	SECN+	4,558	19-3	—
March 22	vs No. 17 Ole Miss	No. 7	Lindsey Nelson Stadium; Knoxville, Tennessee	**W 15-3**	**AJ Causey (5-0)**	Dennis Gunnar (3-1)	None	SECN+	5,489	20-3	2-2
March 23	vs No. 17 Ole Miss	No. 7	Lindsey Nelson Stadium; Knoxville, Tennessee	**L** 5-8	Nichols Mason (3-0)	**AJ Russell (0-1)**	Connor Spencer (5)	SECN+	5,585	20-4	2-3
March 24	vs No. 17 Ole Miss	No. 7	Lindsey Nelson Stadium; Knoxville, Tennessee	**W 15-4** 7	**Nate Snead (5-1)**	Saunier Grayson (3-3)	None	SECN+	5,677	21-4	3-3
March 26	vs Tennessee Tech*	No. 5	Lindsey Nelson Stadium; Knxville, Tennessee	**W 11-1** 7	**Derek Schaefer (2-0)**	Matt Gelorme (0-1)	None	SECN+	4,992	22-4	—
March 29	vs No. 22 Georgia	No. 5	Lindsey Nelson Stadium; Knoxville, Tennessee	**L** 2-16	Charlie Goldstein (4-0)	**AJ Causey (5-1)**	None	SECN+	5,575	22-5	3-4
March 30	vs No. 22 Georgia	No. 5	Lindsey Nelson Stadium; Knoxville, Tennessee	**W 16-11**	**Kirby Connell (3-0)**	Kolten Smith (2-2)	None	SECN	5,677	23-5	4-4
March 31	vs No. 22 Georgia	No. 5	Lindsey Nelson Stadium; Konxville, Tennessee	**W 7-0**	**Zander Sechrist (1-0)**	Christian Mracna (3-2)	**Nate Snead (2)**	SECN	5,006	24-5	5-4

April (13-3)

Date	Opponent	Rank	Site/stadium	Score	Win	Loss	Save	TV	Attendance	Overall record	SEC record
April 5	vs Auburn	No. 4	Plainsman Park; Auburn, Alabama	**L** 5-9	Carson Myers (2-2)	**AJ Causey (5-2)**	John Armstrong (2)	SECN+	5,119	25-6	5-5
April 6	vs Auburn	No. 4	Plainsman Park; Auburn, Alabama	**W 12-2** 7	**Drew Beam (4-1)**	Connor McBride (3-2)	None	SECN+	5,566	25-6	6-5
April 7	vs Auburn	No, 4	Plainsman Park; Auburn, Alabama	**W 19-5** 7	**Nate Snead (6-1)**	Will Cannon (0-1)	None	SECN+	4,468	26-6	7-5
April 9	vs Alabama A&M*	No. 4	Lindsey Nelson Stadium; Knoxville, Tennessee	**W 20-2** 7	**JJ Garcia (1-0)**	Roman Sorrell (0-4)	None	SECN+	4,805	27-6	—
April 12	vs No, 25 LSU	No. 4	Lindsey Nelson Stadium; Knoxville, Tennessee	**W 6-3**	**AJ Causey (6-2)**	Jump Gage (2-1)	**Kirby Connell (2)**	ESPNU	5,901	28-6	8-5
April 13	vs No. 25 LSU	No. 4	Lindsey Nelson Stadium; Knoxville, Tennessee	**W 3-1**	**Drew Beam (5-1)**	Luke Holman (6-2)	**Nate Snead (3)**	SECN	6,155	29-6	9-5
April 14	vs No. 25 LSU	No. 4	Lindsey Nelson Stadium; Knoxville, Tennessee	**W 8-4**	**Andrew Behnke (1-0)**	Aiden Moffett (0-1)	**Aaron Combs (1)**	SECN	6,092	30-6	10-5
April 16	vs Bellarmine*	No. 2	Lindsey Nelson Stadium; Knoxville, Tennessee	**W 20-5**	**Dallas Matthew (1-0)**	Cooper Hellman (1-3)	None	SECN+	4,617	31-6	—
April 16	at No. 3 Kentucky	No. 2	Kentucky Proud Park; Lexington, Kentucky	**L** 3-5	Travis Smith (3-2)	**AJ Causey (6-3)**	Johnny Hummel (5)	SECN+	6,922	31-7	10-6
April 17	at No. 3 Kentucky	No. 2	Kentucky Proud Park; Lexington, Kentucky	**W 9-4**	**Aaron Combs (1-1)**	Dominic Niman (7-3)	None	SECN+	7,304	32-7	11-6
April 18	at No. 3 Kentucky	No. 2	Kentucky Proud Park; Lexington, Kentucky	**W 13-11**	**Kirby Connell (4-0)**	Travis Smith (3-3)	**Marcus Phillips (2)**	SECN+	6,797	33-7	12-6
April 23	vs Western Carolina*	No. 3	Lindsey Nelson Stadium; Knoxville, Tennessee	**W 12-4**	**Andrew Behnke (2-0)**	Spenser Hamblen (2-4)	None	SECN+	4,878	34-7	—
April 25	vs Missouri	No. 3	Lindsey Nelson Stadium; Knoxville, Tennessee	**W 10-1**	**AJ Causey (7-3)**	Ryan Magdic (1-2)	None	SECN	5,529	35-7	13-6
April 26	vs Missouri	No. 3	Lindsey Nelson Stadium; Knoxville, Tennessee	**W 3-2**	**Drew Beam (6-1)**	Logan Lunceford (1-4)	**Aaron Combs (2)**	SECN+	5,504	36-7	14-6
April 27	vs Missouri	No. 3	Lindsey Nelson Stadium; Knoxville, Tennessee	**W 3-2**	**Nate Snead (7-1)**	Carter Rustad (4-6)	**Kirby Connell (3)**	SECN	6,026	37-7	15-6
April 30	vs Lipscomb*	No. 3	Lindsey Nelson Stadium; Knoxville, Tennessee	**L** 6-9	Ryan Kutz (1-2)	**Andrew Behnke (2-1)**	None	SECN+	4,890	37-8	—

May (9-2)

Date	Opponent	Rank	Site/stadium	Score	Win	Loss	Save	TV	Attendance	Overall record	SEC record
May 2	at Florida	No. 3	Condron Ballpark; Gainesville, Florida	Postponed (Inclement Weather) Makeup: May 3 as a single-admission doubleheader						37-8	15-6
May 3 DH	at Florida	No. 3	Condron Ballpark; Gainesville, Florida	**W 6-2**	**AJ Causey (8-3)**	Neely Brandon (1-3)	**Kirby Connell (4)**	SECN+	6,326	38-8	16-6
May 3 DH	at Florida	No. 3	Condron Ballpark; Gainesville, Florida	**L** 3-4	Jameson Fisher (3-0)	**Drew Beam (6-2)**	Luke McNeillie (2)	SECN+	6,326	38-9	16-7
May 4	at Florida	No. 3	Condron Ballpark; Gainesville, Florida	**W 16-3** 7	**Nate Snead (8-1)**	Jac Caglianone (5-1)	None	SECN+	7,335	39-9	17-7
May 7	vs Queens*	No. 1	Lindsey Nelson Stadium; Knoxville, Tennessee	**W 6-3**	**JJ Garcia (2-0)**	Jack Renaud (0-5)	**Aaron Combs (3)**	SECN+	5,178	40-9	—
May 10	at Vanderbilt	No. 1	Hawkins Field; Nashville, Tennessee	**W 8-4**	**AJ Causey (9-3)**	Miller Green (1-4)	None	SECN+	3,802	41-9	18-7
May 11	at Vanderbilt	No. 1	Hawkins Field; Nashville, Tennessee	**W 7-6**	**Drew Beam (7-2)**	Greysen Carter (4-2)	**Nate Snead (4)**	SECN	3,802	42-9	19-7
May 12	at Vanderbilt	No. 1	Hawkins Field; Nashville, Tennessee	**L** 0-3	JD Thompson (4-1)	**Zander Sechrist (1-1)**	Devin Futrell (1)	ESPN2	3,802	42-10	19-8
May 14	vs Belmont*	No. 1	Lindsey Nelson Stadium; Knoxville, Tennessee	**W 10-0** 7	**JJ Garcia (3-0)**	Jordan Zuger (1-2)	None	SECN+	5,022	43-10	—
May 16	vs No. 24 South Carolina	No. 1	Lindsey Nelson Stadium; Knoxville, Tennessee	**W 9-3**	**AJ Causey (10-3)**	Ty Good (5-2)	None	SECN+	5,730	44-10	20-8
May 17	vs No. 24 South Carolina	No. 1	Lindsey Nelson Stadium; Knoxville, Tennessee	**W 8-3**	**Drew Beam (8-2)**	Garrett Gainey (0-3)	None	SECN+	5,657	45-10	21-8
May 18	vs No. 24 South Carolina	No. 1	Lindsey Nelson Stadium; Knoxville, Tennessee	**W 4-1**	**Zander Sechrist (2-1)**	Matthew Becker (5-3)	**Aaron Combs (4)**	SECN+	5,759	46-10	22-8

Postseason (14-3)

SEC Tournament (4-1)

Date	Opponent	Rank	Site/stadium	Score	Win	Loss	Save	TV	Attendance	Overall record	Tournament record
May 22; 2nd Round	vs Vanderbilt (8)	No. 1 (1)	Hoover Metropolitan Stadium; Hoover, Alabama	**L** 4-13	Green (2-4)	**Nate Snead (8-2)**	None	SECN	11,840	46-11	0-1
May 23; 2nd Round (LR)	vs No. 3 Texas A&M (4)	No. 1 (1)	Hoover Metropolitan Stadium; Hoover, Alabama	**W 7-4**	**AJ Causey (11-3)**	Perry (2-1)	None	SECN	6,825	47-11	1-1
May 24; 3rd Round	vs No. 14 Mississippi State (5)	No. 1 (1)	Hoover Metropolitan Stadium; Hoover, Alabama	**W 6-5**	**Aaron Combs (2-1)**	Davis (5-1)	**Nate Snead (5)**	SECN	13,335	48-11	2-1
May 25; Semifinal	vs Vanderbilt (8)	No. 1 (1)	Hoover Metropolitan Stadium; Hoover, Alabama	**W 6-4**	**Zander Sechrist (3-1)**	Guth (1-2)	**Marcus Phillips (3)**	SECN	14,386	49-11	3-1
May 26; Championship Game	vs LSU (11)	No. 1 (1)	Hoover Metropolitan Stadium; Hoover, Alabama	**W 4-3**	**Dylan Loy (2-0)**	Ulloa Fidel (2-2)	**Aaron Combs (5)**	ESPN2	15,686	50-11	4-1

Knoxville Regional (3–0)

Date	Opponent	Rank	Site/stadium	Score	Win	Loss	Save	TV	Attendance	Overall record	NCAA record
May 31	vs Northern Kentucky (4)	No. 1 (1)	Lindsey Nelson Stadium; Knoxville, Tennessee	**W 9-3**	**AJ Causey (12-3)**	Gillis Tanner (8-3)	None	SEC Network	6,396	51-11	1-0
June 1	vs Indiana (3)	No. 1 (1)	Lindsey Nelson Stadium; Knoxville, Tennessee	**W 12-6**	**Andrew Behnke (3-1)**	Charlie Taylor (4-2)	None	ESPNU	6,255	52-11	2-0
June 2	vs Southern Miss (2)	No. 1 (1)	Lindsey Nelson Stadium; Knoxville, Tennessee	**W 12-3**	**Nate Snead (9-2)**	Chandler Best (3-1)	None	ESPN+	5,963	53-11	3-0

Knoxville Super Regional (2-1)

Date	Opponent	Rank	Site/stadium	Score	Win	Loss	Save	TV	Attendance	Overall record	NCAA record
June 7 Game 1; 3:00 p.m. EST	vs No. 16 Evansville (4)	No. 1 (1)	Lindsey Nelson Stadium; Knoxville, Tennessee	**W 11-6**	**AJ Causey (13-3)**	Kenton Deverman (9-2)	None	ESPN2	6,195	54-11	1-0
June 8 Game 2; 11:00 a.m. EST	vs No. 16 Evansville (4)	No. 1 (1)	Lindsey Nelson Stadium; Knoxville, Tennessee	**L 8–10**	Jakob Meyer (4–4)	**Kirby Connell (4–1)**	Shane Harris (4)	ESPN2	6,506	54–12	1–1
June 9 Game 3; 6:00 p.m. EST	vs No. 16 Evansville (4)	No. 1 (1)	Lindsey Nelson Stadium; Knoxville, Tennessee	**W 12-1**	**Zander Sechrist (4-1)**	Kevin Reed (5-3)	None	ESPNU	6,489	55-12	2-1

College World Series (5−1)

Date	Opponent	Rank	Site/stadium	Score	Win	Loss	Save	TV	Attendance	Overall record	NCAA record
June 14; Game 1; 7:00 p.m. EST	vs Florida State (8)	No. 1 (1)	Charles Schwab Field; Omaha, Nebraska	W 12-11	**Nate Snead (10-2)**	Brennen Oxford (2-1)	None	ESPN	25,499	56−12	1−0
June 16; Game 2; 7:00 p.m. EST	vs North Carolina (4)	No. 1 (1)	Charles Schwab Field; Omaha, Nebraska	W 6−1	**Drew Beam (9−2)**	Shea Sprague (3−2)	None	ESPN2	25,140	57−12	2−0
June 19; Game 3; 2:00 p.m. EST	vs Florida State (8)	No. 1 (1)	Charles Schwab Field; Omaha, Nebraska	W 7-2	**Zander Sechrist (5–1)**	John Abraham (5–2)	None	ESPN	24,696	58−12	3−0
**College World Series Championship Finals (2−1)**
June 22; Game 4; 7:30 p.m. EST	vs Texas A&M (3)	No. 1 (1)	Charles Schwab Field; Omaha, Nebraska	L 9-5	Josh Stewart (2−2)	**Chris Stamos (3−1)**	None	ESPN	26,498	58−13	0−1
June 23; Game 5; 2:00 p.m. EST	vs Texas A&M (3)	No. 1 (1)	Charles Schwab Field; Omaha, Nebraska	W 4-1	**Aaron Combs (3-1)**	Kaiden Wilson (0-2)	Nate Snead	ABC	25,987	59-13	1-1
June 24; Game 6; 7:00 p.m. EST	vs Texas A&M (3)	No. 1 (1)	Charles Schwab Field; Omaha, Nebraska	W 6-5	**Zander Sechrist (6-1)**	Justin Lamkin (3-3)	Aaron Combs	ESPN	24,685	60-13	2-1

Legend: = Win = Loss = Canceled Bold = Tennessee team member
*Denotes non–conference game • Schedule source • Rankings based on the teams' current ranking in the ESPN/USA Today Coaches Poll • (#) Tournament seedings in parentheses.

== Statistics ==
=== Record vs. conference opponents ===
Last two did not qualify for conf. tourn. Blank are not scheduled. Blue are home games, otherwise away.

2024 SEC baseball records Source: 2024 SEC baseball game results, 2024 SEC baseball schedule
Team	W–L	ALA	ARK	AUB	FLA	UGA	KEN	LSU	MSU	MIZZ	MISS	SCAR	TENN	TAMU	VAN	Team	Div	SR	SW
ALA	13–17		2–1	1–2	.	0–3	0–3	2–1	1–2	.	2–1	2–1	2–1	1–2	.	ALA	W4	5–5	0–2
ARK	20–10	1–2		2–1	2–1	.	1–2	3–0	2–1	3–0	3–0	2–1	.	1–2	.	ARK	W1	7–3	3–0
AUB	8–22	2–1	1–2		.	.	0–3	1–2	0–3	2–1	1–2	.	1–2	0–3	0–3	AUB	W7	2–8	0–4
FLA	13–17	.	1–2	.		2–1	1–2	2–1	2–1	0–3	.	1–2	1–2	2–1	1–2	FLA	E5	4–6	0–1
UGA	17–13	3–0	.	.	1–2		0–3	.	1–2	2–1	2–1	3–0	1–2	1–2	3–0	UGA	E3	5–5	3–1
KEN	22–8	3–0	2–1	3–0	2–1	3–0		.	.	2–1	3–0	1–2	1–2	.	2–1	KEN	E2	8–2	4–0
LSU	13–17	1–2	0–3	2–1	1–2	.	.		1–2	2–1	3–0	.	0–3	2–1	1–2	LSU	W5	4–6	1–2
MSU	17–13	2–1	1–2	3–0	1–2	2–1	.	2–1		2–1	1–2	.		1–2	2–1	MSU	W3	6–4	1–0
MIZZ	9–21	.	0–3	1–2	3–0	1–2	1–2	1–2	1–2		.	1–2	0–3	.	0–3	MIZZ	E7	1–9	1–3
MISS	11–19	1–2	0–3	2–1	.	1–2	0–3	0–3	2–1	.		2–1	1–2	2–1	.	MISS	W6	4–6	0–3
SCAR	13–17	1–2	1–2	.	2–1	0–3	2–1	.	.	2–1	1–2		0–3	1–2	3–0	SCAR	E6	4–6	1–2
TENN	22–8	1–2	.	2–1	2–1	2–1	2–1	3–0	.	3–0	2–1	3–0		.	2–1	TENN	E1	9–1	3–0
TAMU	19–11	2–1	2–1	3–0	1–2	2–1	.	1–2	2–1	.	1–2	2–1	.		3–0	TAMU	W2	7–3	2–0
VAN	13–17	.	.	3–0	2–1	0–3	1–2	2–1	1–2	3–0	.	0–3	1–2	0–3		VAN	E4	4–6	2–3
Team	W–L	ALA	ARK	AUB	FLA	UGA	KEN	LSU	MSU	MIZZ	MISS	SCAR	TENN	TAMU	VAN	Team	Div	SR	SW

Updated for entire regular season. Tie Brkrs: TENN>KEN head to head. MSU>UGA head to head. ALA>VAN & FLA>SCAR & LSU TENN common. VAN>FLA head to head. SCAR>LSU ARK common. ARK SEC Tournament seed>KEN, ARK West champion.
