= Josh Elander =

Collegiate baseball head coach

Current position
- Title: Head Coach
- Team: Tennessee
- Conference: SEC
- Record: 38–22 (.633)
- Annual salary: $1 million

Biographical details
- Born: March 19, 1991 (age 35); Austin, Texas, U.S.
- Education: TCU

Playing career
- 2010–2012: TCU
- 2012: Danville Braves
- 2013: Lynchburg Hillcats
- 2013: Rome Braves
- 2014: Lynchburg Hillcats
- 2015: Kane County Cougars
- Positions: Catcher, OF

Coaching career (HC unless noted)
- 2016: TCU (asst.)
- 2017: Arkansas (asst.)
- 2018–2025: Tennessee (asst.)
- 2026–present: Tennessee

Head coaching record
- Overall: 38–22 (.633)

Joshua Lucas Elander (born March 19, 1991) is an American college baseball coach, and a former minor league baseball player, who is currently the head baseball coach at the University of Tennessee. He also spent eight seasons as an assistant coach and recruiting coordinator under head coach Tony Vitello. During his time as an assistant, the Volunteers made six NCAA regionals (2019, 2021-2025), four NCAA super regionals (2021-2024), and three College World Series appearances (2021, 2023, 2024), winning the College World Series National Championship in 2024 over Texas A&M for the Volunteers’ first-ever national title.

== Education and playing career ==
A native of Round Rock, Texas, Elander attended Texas Christian University, where he played for the Horned Frogs from 2010-12 under head coach Jim Schlossnagle.

As a freshman, he was selected for the 2010 Louisville Slugger and Ping!Baseball Freshman All-American team, after batting .356 with 69 hits and 33 RBIs, and helping TCU reach the College World Series. As a sophomore, Elander earned a spot on the USA Baseball Collegiate National Team in 2011.

=== Minor leagues ===
Elander was drafted by the Atlanta Braves in the sixth round of the 2012 MLB Draft. His best season came in 2013, when he was named the Atlanta Braves' Minor League Player of the Year and received their Hank Aaron Award as the top hitter in the minor leagues.

On April 3, 2015, he was traded to the Arizona Diamondbacks for Trevor Cahill and cash considerations, but he was ultimately released on May 13, 2015. During his professional career, he hit .273 with 21 home runs and 135 RBIs in 222 career games.

== Coaching career ==
=== Assistant coach (2016-2025) ===
Following his playing career, Elander returned to his alma mater, TCU, as a student assistant. He completed his degree in communications from TCU in 2016, while the Horned Frogs reached the College World Series for the third consecutive year. The next year, he joined the University of Arkansas coaching staff as a volunteer assistant, where he developed Grant Koch into a first team All-SEC catcher and USA Baseball Collegiate National team member.

In 2018, he joined Tony Vitello's staff at the University of Tennessee, where the Volunteers improved their offensive numbers across the board. As hitting coach, he developed Tennessee's top offensive players. The Volunteers led the nation in 2022 with 158 home runs (eclipsing the school record by 51), and led the nation in on base percentage (.419), runs (613), and slugging percentage (.604).

In 2024, Elander coached four All-Americans in Blake Burke, Christian Moore, Dylan Dreiling, and Dean Curley, contributing to a home run record for the program, and the second most in collegiate baseball history at 184. Five players hit 20 or more home runs for the first time in NCAA history, led by Moore (34), Dreiling, 23, Billy Amick (23), Burke (20), and Kavares Tears (20). After winning the SEC regular season, the SEC Tournament, the Knoxville Regional, and the Knoxville Super Regional, the Volunteers reached the College World Series. In the finals, Elander's team faced his former collegiate coach, Jim Schlossnagle and the Texas A&M Aggies, but the Volunteers came back with a win in Game 3 for the national championship in the program's history, and a 60-13 record.

Elander has also secured eight straight Top-15 recruiting classes, with the No. 1 rated classes for 2024 and 2025.

=== Tennessee (2026-present) ===
On October 25, 2025, Elander became the 26th head coach in Tennessee Volunteers baseball program history after Tony Vitello left to become the manager of the San Francisco Giants

== Head coaching record ==
Record table
Season	Team	Overall	Conference	Standing	Postseason
Tennessee Volunteers (Southeastern Conference) (2026–present)
2026	Tennessee	38–22	15–15	T–9th	NCAA Regional
Tennessee:		38–22 (.633)	15–15 (.500)		
Total:		38–22 (.633)			
National champion Postseason invitational champion Conference regular season champion Conference regular season and conference tournament champion Division regular season champion Division regular season and conference tournament champion Conference tournament champion
