= Frank Anderson (baseball coach) =

American baseball coach (born 1959)

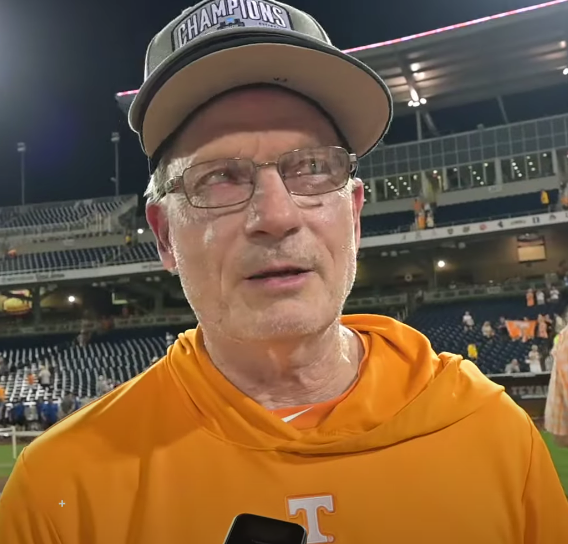
- Anderson with Tennessee in 2024

San Francisco Giants – No. 85
- Coach / Manager
- Born: February 14, 1959 (age 67); Grant, Nebraska, U.S.

Teams
- As coach: San Francisco Giants (2026–present); As college coach: Emporia State (assistant) (1984–1987); Howard College (asst.) (1987–1989); Texas Tech (asst.) (1990–1999); Texas (asst.) (2004–2003); Oklahoma State (2004–2012); Houston (asst.) (2013–2017); Tennessee (PC) (2017–2025); Tennessee (Interim) (2025)

Frank Anderson (born February 14, 1959) is an American professional baseball coach and former outfielder who currently serves as the director of pitching performance for the San Francisco Giants of Major League Baseball (MLB). Anderson played college baseball at Mid-Plains Junior College from 1979 to 1980 and University of Nebraska at Kearney from 1981 to 1982. He graduated from Emporia State University in 1983, though he did not play collegiate baseball there. He served as the head coach at Oklahoma State University from 2004 to 2013.

== Early life ==
A native of Grant, Nebraska, Anderson graduated from Emporia State University in Emporia, Kansas in 1983 and received his master's degree from the school in 1985. Prior to attending ESU, Anderson was a junior college All-American at Mid-Plains College in North Platte, Nebraska, and then an All-District and All-Area outfielder at University of Nebraska at Kearney.

== College coaching career ==
Upon completing his bachelor's degree in physical education, Anderson began his coaching career at Emporia State while working on his master's in science with an emphasis in exercise physiology. He helped the Hornets reach the 1984 NAIA World Series and then accepted the assistant coaching position at Howard College in Big Spring, Texas, in 1987. Over his three seasons there, the Hawks not only ranked among the top 20 junior colleges in the country, but also had 26 of Anderson's pupils drafted by major league clubs.

Anderson was pitching coach with the Texas Tech Red Raiders from 1990 to 1999 and an assistant coach for the Texas Longhorns from 2000 to 2003.

Anderson became the head coach for the Oklahoma State Cowboys in 2004., Anderson's team won the 2004 Big 12 Conference baseball tournament. In 2005, his team went 34–25, including an upset over the top ranked Texas Longhorns. In 2006, OSU went 41–20, and earned a number 1 seed in the NCAA tournament. His program reached a national ranking of 12th. In his final four seasons he had an overall record of 130–100 overall (44–58 in the Big 12). After his team failed to qualify for the NCAA tournament, Anderson was fired on May 29, 2012.

In July 2012, Anderson was hired as the pitching coach for the Houston Cougars. On June 14, 2017, it was announced that Anderson would become the pitching coach for the Tennessee Volunteers. Anderson won a College World Series National Championship with Tennessee in the 2024 season.

On October 22, 2025, Anderson was promoted to serve as Tennessee's interim head coach, following the incumbent Tony Vitello's departure to serve as the manager of the San Francisco Giants.

== Professional coaching career ==
On November 22, 2025, it was announced that Anderson would be leaving Tennessee and following Vitello to join the coaching staff of the San Francisco Giants.

== Personal life ==
Anderson and his wife Sandra have two children: a son, Brett, who played as a starting pitcher in Major League Baseball, and a daughter, Katelyn.

== Division I head coaching record ==
Record table
Season	Team	Overall	Conference	Standing	Postseason
Oklahoma State Cowboys (Big 12 Conference) (2004–2012)
2004	Oklahoma State	38–24	15–11	4th	NCAA Regional
2005	Oklahoma State	34–25	12–15	6th	
2006	Oklahoma State	41–20	18–9	2nd	NCAA Regional
2007	Oklahoma State	42–21	16–11	3rd	NCAA Super Regional
2008	Oklahoma State	44–18	18–9	2nd	NCAA Regional
2009	Oklahoma State	34–24	9–16	8th	NCAA Regional
2010	Oklahoma State	29–26	8–19	9th	
2011	Oklahoma State	35–25	14–12	4th	NCAA Regional
2012	Oklahoma State	32–25	13–11	5th	
Oklahoma State:		329–208			
Total:		329–208			
National champion Postseason invitational champion Conference regular season champion Conference regular season and conference tournament champion Division regular season champion Division regular season and conference tournament champion Conference tournament champion
