= Billy Amick =

American baseball player (born 2002)

New York Mets
- Third baseman
- Born: November 4, 2002 (age 23); Mooresville, North Carolina, U.S.
- Bats: Right Throws: Right
- Stats at Baseball Reference

Career highlights and awards
- College World Series champion (2024)

William Lyndon Amick (born November 4, 2002) is an American professional baseball third baseman in the New York Mets organization. He played college baseball for the Tennessee Volunteers and Clemson Tigers.

== Amateur career ==
Amick attended P27 Academy in Lexington, South Carolina. He committed to Clemson University to play college baseball.

As a freshman at Clemson in 2022, Amick played in nine games and hit .105 over 19 at-bats. As a sophomore in 2023, he played in 46 games, hitting .413/.464/.773 with 13 home runs and 63 runs batted in (RBI) over 167 at-bats. After the 2023 season, he played collegiate summer baseball with the Hyannis Harbor Hawks of the Cape Cod Baseball League.

Prior to his junior season in 2024, Amick entered the transfer portal and transferred to the University of Tennessee. He entered the season as one of the top prospects for the 2024 Major League Baseball draft, and was the starting third baseman for the Tennessee team that won the 2024 Men's College World Series.

== Professional career ==
Amick was drafted by the Minnesota Twins in the 2nd round, with the 60th overall selection, of the 2024 Major League Baseball draft. On July 24, 2024, Amick signed with the Twins on a $1.45 million contract.

On July 31, 2026, Amick and infielder Bruin Agbayani were traded to the New York Mets in exchange for pitcher A. J. Minter.

== Personal life ==
Amick is the son of former NASCAR driver Lyndon Amick.
