= Gavin Kilen =

American baseball player (born 2004)

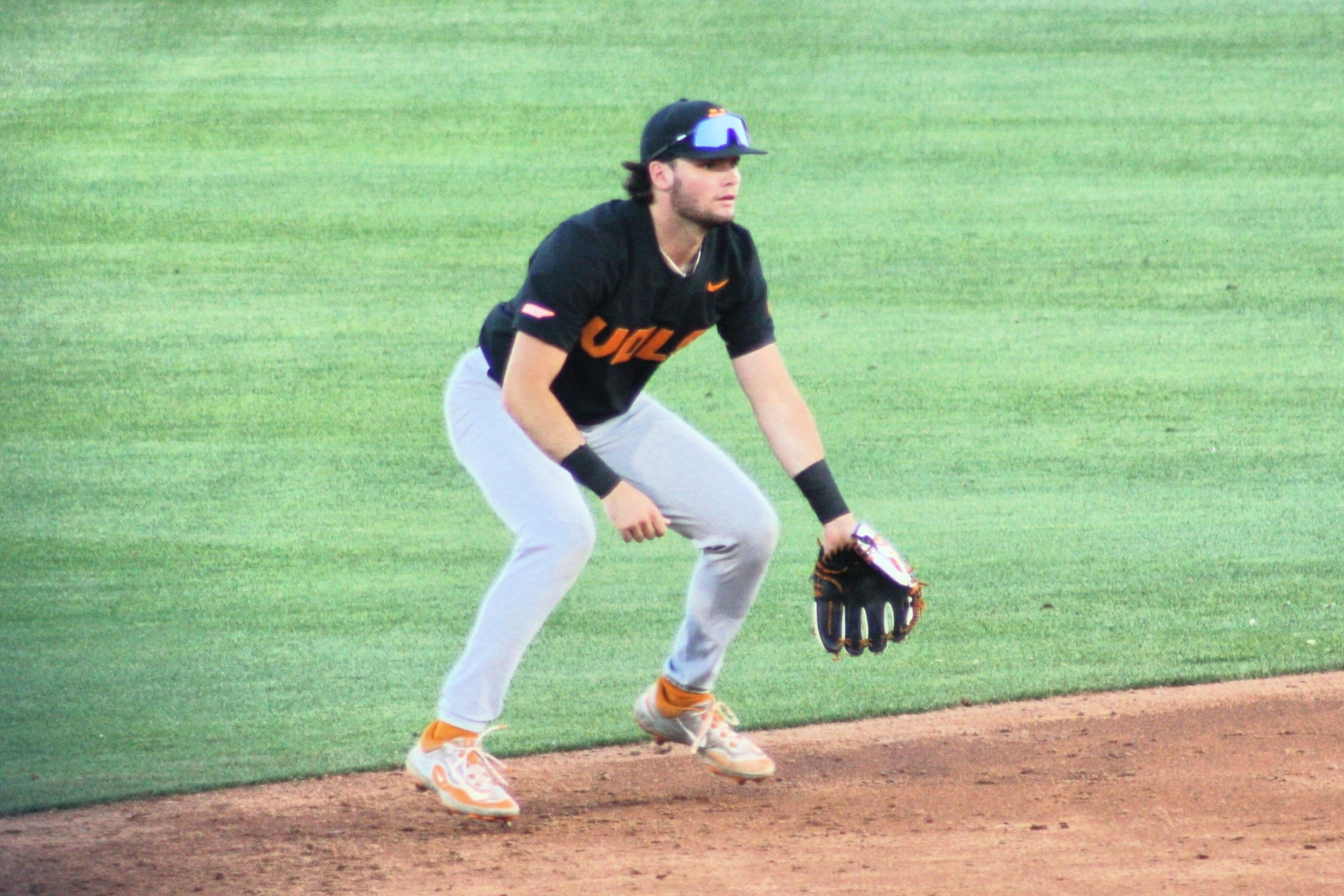
- Kilen with Tennessee in 2025

San Francisco Giants
- Second baseman
- Born: March 28, 2004 (age 22); Janesville, Wisconsin, U.S.
- Bats: Left Throws: Right
- Stats at Baseball Reference

Gavin Christopher Kilen (born March 28, 2004) is an American professional baseball second baseman in the San Francisco Giants organization. He was drafted 13th overall by the Giants in the 2025 MLB draft.

== Amateur career ==
Kilen attended Milton High School in Milton, Wisconsin. He was selected by the Boston Red Sox in the 13th round of the 2022 Major League Baseball draft, but did not sign and played college baseball at the University of Louisville.

As a freshman at Louisville in 2023, Kilen played in 46 games with 38 starts and hit .265/.321/.338 with 18 runs batted in (RBI) over 151 at bats. As a sophomore in 2024, he started 54 of 56 games at shortstop, hitting .330/.361/.591 with nine home runs and 41 RBI over 215 at bats. In 2023 and 2024, he played collegiate summer baseball with the Falmouth Commodores of the Cape Cod Baseball League.

After the 2024 season, Kilen entered the transfer portal and transferred to the University of Tennessee. He entered the 2025 season as the starting second baseman. Over 53 games played for Tennessee, Kilen hit .357 with 15 home runs and 46 RBIs.

== Professional career ==
Kilen was drafted by the San Francisco Giants with the 13th overall selection of the 2025 Major League Baseball draft. He signed with San Francisco for a $5.24 million signing bonus on July 21, 2025.

Kilen made his professional debut after signing with the San Jose Giants and was placed on the injured list after ten games.
