= Tony Vitello =

American baseball player and manager (born 1978)

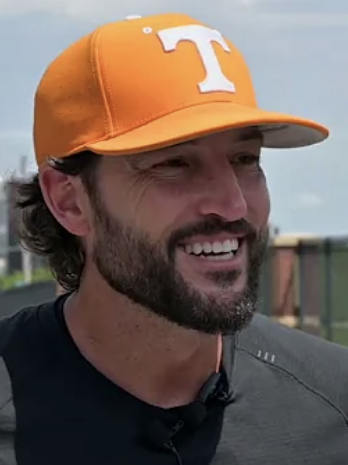
- Vitello with Tennessee in 2024

San Francisco Giants – No. 23
- Manager
- Born: October 9, 1978 (age 48); St. Louis, Missouri, U.S.
- Bats: Right Throws: Right

MLB statistics (through August 21, 2026)
- Managerial record: 65–97
- Winning %: .401

College statistics (through 2025 season)
- Head coach record: 341–131
- Winning %: .722
- Stats at Baseball Reference
- Managerial record at Baseball Reference

Teams
- As MLB manager: San Francisco Giants (2026–present); As college coach: Missouri (assistant) (2003–2010); TCU (assistant) (2011–2013); Arkansas (assistant) (2014–2017); Tennessee (2018–2025)

Career highlights and awards
- College: NCAA champion (2024); 2× SEC regular season (2022, 2025); 2× SEC Tournament (2022, 2024); ABCA Coach of the Year (2024); NCBWA Coach of the Year (2021); 2× Perfect Game Coach of the Year (2021, 2022); SEC Coach of the Year (2022)

Anthony Gregory Vitello (/vaɪˈtɛloʊ/ vy-TEL-oh; born October 9, 1978) is an American professional baseball manager who is the manager for the San Francisco Giants of Major League Baseball (MLB). Vitello previously coached at the college level with the Tennessee Volunteers, who made five NCAA regionals (2019, 2021–2024), four NCAA super regionals (2021–2024), and three College World Series appearances (2021, 2023, 2024), winning the College World Series in 2024 over Texas A&M for the Volunteers’ first-ever national title.

In 2025, Vitello left Tennessee to become the manager of the Giants, becoming the first college head coach to immediately take on the role of major-league manager when moving to the professional level.

== Early life and education ==
Anthony Gregory Vitello was born on October 9, 1978, in St. Louis, Missouri. Vitello grew up as the only boy of his parents' four children. A native of St. Louis, Missouri, he attended De Smet High School, where his father Greg was a soccer and baseball coach for 46 years and won soccer titles in 1991, 1993, 1995, 1997, and 2011, in addition to a baseball state championship in 2000. Greg Vitello was later elected to the Missouri Sports Hall of Fame. Tony played both sports for his father and was on the state-champion soccer team in 1997. He grew up a Chicago Cubs fan and was at game 7 of the 2016 World Series with his father.

After high school, Vitello attended Spring Hill College, a Division II school in Mobile, Alabama, for a year before transferring to the University of Missouri. He was a three-year letter-winner for the Missouri Tigers baseball team (2000–02) under head coach Tim Jamieson, where he earned Academic All-Big 12 Conference honors as a senior and was named to the Big One Commissioner's Honor Roll twice.

== Coaching career 2003-present ==
=== Assistant coach (2002–2017) ===
Following his playing career and the completion of his management degree at Missouri, Vitello served as the associate head coach for the Salinas Packers of the California Collegiate League in 2002. The Packers finished 50–14 and earned their first trip to the NBC World Series in Wichita, Kansas. Then, Vitello joined the Missouri coaching staff as a volunteer assistant in 2003 and completed his coursework for his master's degree in business. In 2004, he was elevated to full-time assistant coach.

One of his very first recruits in coaching was Ian Kinsler, who he helped convince to transfer to Columbia away from his hometown school, Arizona State, for his junior year, a move that would ultimately help Kinsler on his path to becoming a major league All-Star. Vitello then recruited Max Scherzer at a nearby high school, and within three years he developed Scherzer into a first-round draft pick, perfecting his pitching mechanics, growing his knowledge of the game, motivating his competitive fire, being diligent in preparation, and then dominating hitters in games with high intensity. From there, Vitello's reputation throughout baseball as an elite players' coach took off.

In 2008 and 2009, he developed additional first-round pitchers in consecutive drafts, Aaron Crow and Kyle Gibson, respectively. Mizzou made the postseason in seven out of eight years during his tenure, while he maintained top-25 nationally ranked recruiting classes in three of his final four years in Columbia.

In 2011, he joined Jim Schlossnagle's staff for the TCU Horned Frogs, where he spent three seasons as an assistant coach and recruiting coordinator. In his three years at TCU, Vitello lured some of the top players in the country to Fort Worth and helped the Horned Frogs to a pair of NCAA tournament appearances, including a super regional berth in 2012.

In 2014, he left TCU for Arkansas, where he became one of the premier assistant coaches in the country and contributed to the Razorbacks becoming one of the most competitive programs in the nation during his four-year tenure. He coached 22 Razorbacks who were selected in four MLB Drafts, helped the Razorbacks average nearly 38 wins per year, including three seasons with more than 40 victories, appeared in three NCAA Tournaments, and recorded a College World Series berth in 2015. That year, star outfielder Andrew Benintendi was arguably the best player in the nation. After finishing a stellar Razorback career by capturing the Golden Spikes Award, the Dick Howser Trophy, and becoming a first-round draft pick, he heavily credited Vitello for developing his maturity in college.

=== Tennessee (2018–2025) ===
On June 7, 2017, Vitello accepted the head coach position for the Tennessee Volunteers baseball program. In his first season at Tennessee, he led the Volunteers to a five-win improvement in conference play. The next season, Tennessee had its first 40-win season and NCAA Tournament appearance since 2005. His third season was canceled due to the COVID-19 pandemic; however, Tennessee's 13–0 start to the season had been the second-best in program history, trailing just the 15–0 start from the previous season.

In Vitello's fourth season, the Vols made their fifth appearance in the College World Series (the team's first since 2005) and went 20–10 in conference play to win the SEC Eastern division for the first time since 1997. For his efforts, Vitello was named 2021 National Coach of the Year by NCBWA and Perfect Game. The Vols also boasted a program-record five All-Americans and had seven players taken in the 2021 MLB draft, which was tied for the sixth most of any college team and tied for third-most among SEC programs.

During his fifth season in charge of the Tennessee baseball program, Vitello orchestrated one of the best seasons in college baseball history, leading the Volunteers to their first-ever No. 1 national seed and a program-record 57 victories. UT was one win away from making its second consecutive College World Series appearance but fell to Notre Dame in the Knoxville Super Regional. However, the Big Orange won both the SEC Regular Season and SEC Tournament championships for the first time since 1995. Vitello was named the National Coach of the Year by Perfect Game for the second consecutive season. Tennessee set a program record and led all SEC teams with 10 players selected in the 2022 MLB draft and also set another program record with eight players earning postseason All-America honors.

In his sixth season, a strong second-half surge propelled Tennessee to another successful season in 2023, as the Volunteers reached the College World Series for the second time in three years. The Vols were eliminated in the second round, with both losses coming to LSU. Tennessee had eight players, including a program-record six pitchers, selected in the 2023 MLB draft and also had two players earn All-America honors in pitchers Andrew Lindsey and AJ Russell.

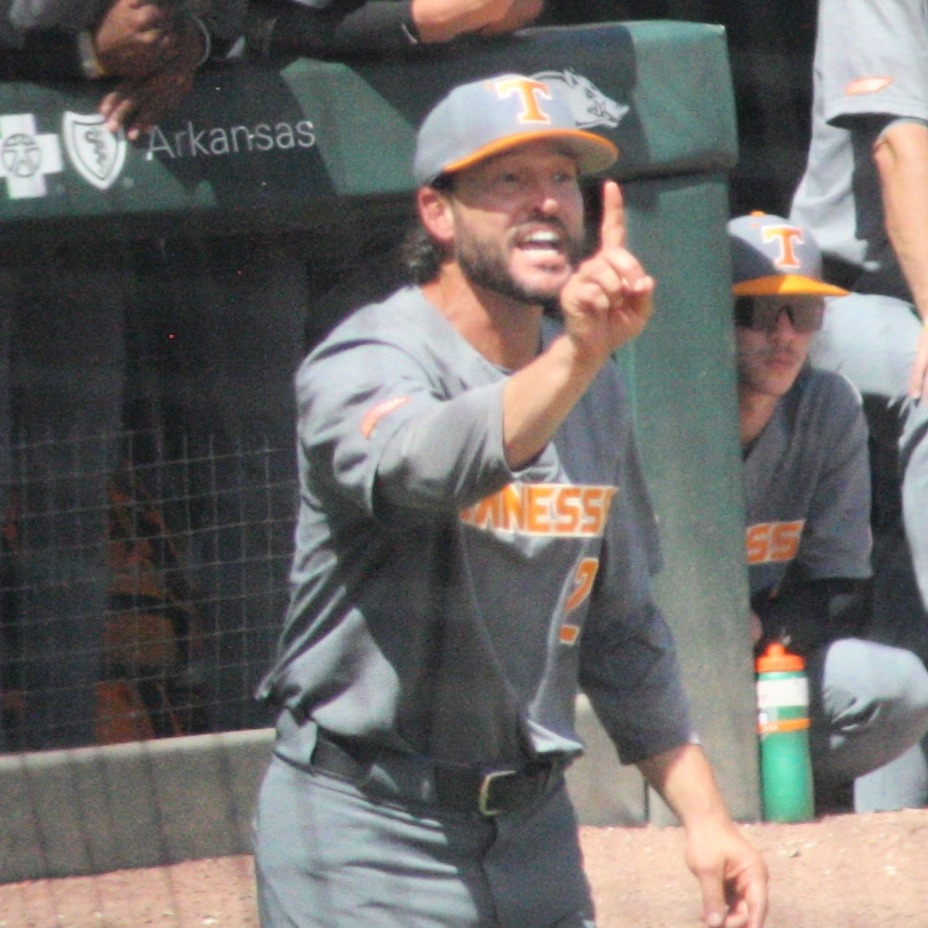
Tony Vitello has a discussion with an umpire while coaching the Tennessee Volunteers

Vitello's seventh season continued the momentum from the previous season, as the Vols again won the SEC Regular Season and SEC Tournament championships and earned the No. 1 national seed in the NCAA Tournament for the second time in three seasons. Unlike 2022, however, the 2024 team defeated Evansville in the Knoxville Super Regional to reach their third College World Series appearance in four seasons. After a walk-off 12–11 victory against Florida State in the first round, the Volunteers defeated North Carolina 6–1 to start 2–0 in Omaha for the first time in school history. This success continued in a 7–2 second win against Florida State to secure a berth in the championship series. Vitello led the Volunteers to a National Championship, winning in three games over Texas A&M. Following the season, Vitello was named the ABCA National Coach of the Year.

In Vitello's eighth and final season at Tennessee, he coached the Vols to a 46–19 record, 16–14 in SEC play. Tennessee would host and win an NCAA Regional championship, but their season ended at Arkansas the following weekend, losing to Dave Van Horn and the Razorbacks in back-to-back games in the Fayetteville Super Regional.

=== San Francisco Giants (2026–present) ===
On October 22, 2025, Vitello was hired to become the next manager of the San Francisco Giants, becoming the first coach in baseball history to transition directly from being the head coach of a college program to managing a major-league team without any prior professional coaching experience.

== Managerial record ==
=== Major League Baseball ===
Team	Year	Regular season					Postseason			
Team	Year	Games	Won	Lost	Win %	Finish	Won	Lost	Win %	Result
SF	2026	162	65	97	.401	4th in NL West				
Total		162	65	97	.401		0	0		

=== College coaching record ===
Record table
Season	Team	Overall	Conference	Standing	Postseason
Tennessee Volunteers (Southeastern Conference) (2018–2025)
2018	Tennessee	29–27	12–18	T–6th (East)	
2019	Tennessee	40–21	14–16	3rd (East)	NCAA Regional
2020	Tennessee	15–2	0–0	(East)	Season canceled due to COVID-19
2021	Tennessee	50–18	20–10	1st (East)	College World Series
2022	Tennessee	57–9	25–5	1st (East)	NCAA Super Regional
2023	Tennessee	44–22	16–14	T–4th (East)	College World Series
2024	Tennessee	60–13	22–8	T–1st (East)	College World Series Champions
2025	Tennessee	46–19	16–14	T–7th	NCAA Super Regional
Tennessee:		341–131 (.722)	125–85 (.595)		
Total:		341–131 (.722)			
National champion Postseason invitational champion Conference regular season champion Conference regular season and conference tournament champion Division regular season champion Division regular season and conference tournament champion Conference tournament champion
