= Drew Beam =

American baseball player (born 2003)

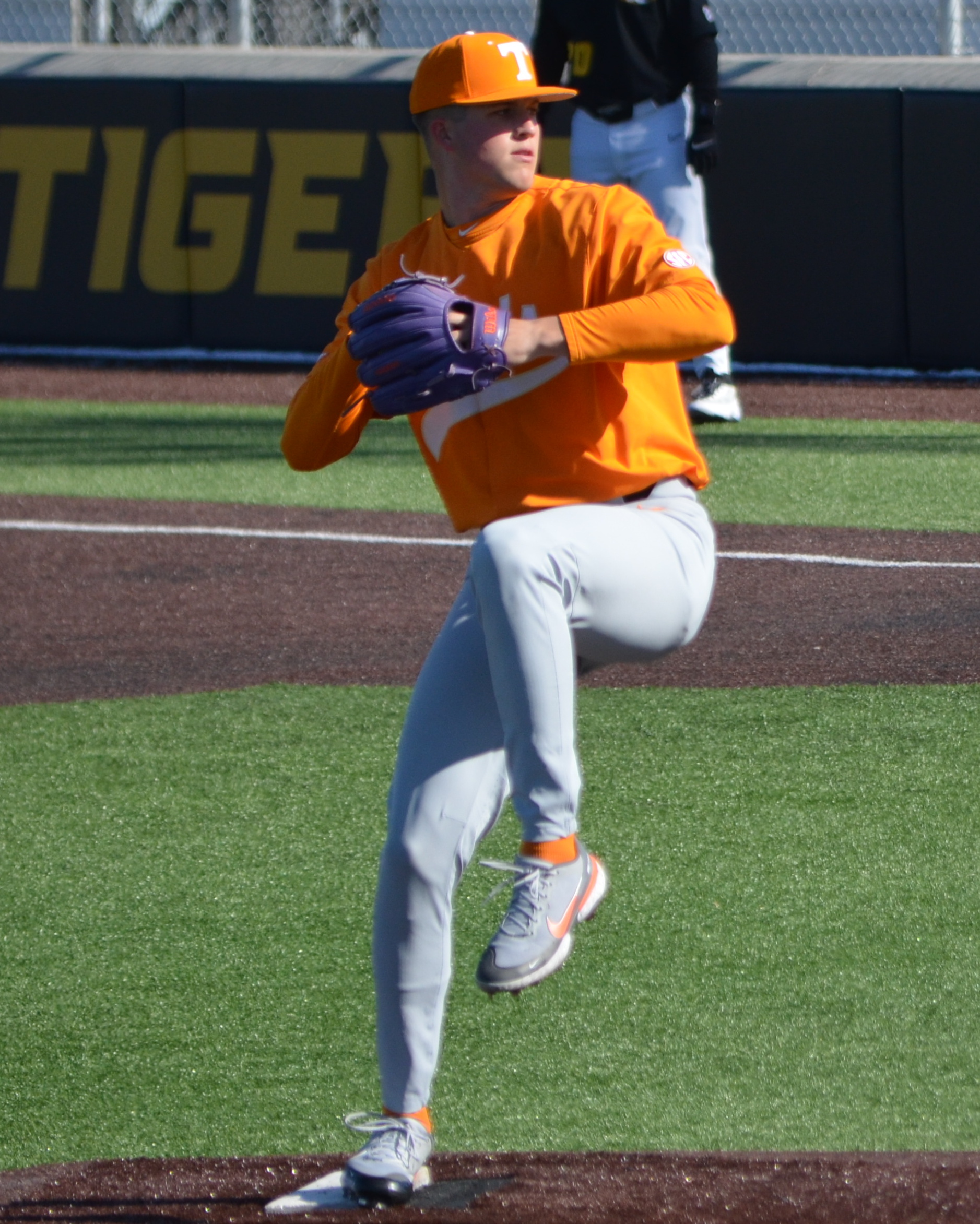
- Beam with Tennessee in 2023

Kansas City Royals
- Pitcher
- Born: February 14, 2003 (age 23); Nashville, Tennessee, U.S.
- Bats: Right Throws: Right

Career highlights and awards
- College World Series champion (2024)

Drew Sanders Beam (born February 14, 2003) is an American professional baseball pitcher in the Kansas City Royals organization.

== Amateur career ==
Beam grew up in Murfreesboro, Tennessee and attended Blackman High School, where he played football and baseball. He had a record of 8–1 and a 0.37 ERA as a sophomore. Beam committed to play college baseball at Tennessee shortly before the beginning of his junior year of high school. His junior season was canceled due to COVID-19. Beam missed his senior baseball season due to injury.

Beam was named to Tennessee's starting rotation entering his freshman season. He was named the Southeastern Conference (SEC) Pitcher of the Week and Freshman of the Week after throwing a complete-game shutout against fifth-ranked Vanderbilt on April 3, 2022. Beam was named the SEC Freshman of the Year and second team All-Conference at the end of the season.

== Professional career ==
The Kansas City Royals selected Beam in the third round, with the 76th overall pick of the 2024 Major League Baseball draft. On July 21, 2024, Beam signed with the Royals on a $1.1 million contract.

== Personal life ==
Beam is the son of Jason and Kelli Beam. Beam is a Christian.
