= Tegan Kuhns =

American baseball player (born 2005)

St. Louis Cardinals
- Pitcher
- Born: May 25, 2005 (age 21); Hagerstown, Maryland, U.S.
- Bats: Switch Throws: Right
- Stats at Baseball Reference

Tegan Michael Kuhns (born May 25, 2005) is an American professional baseball pitcher in the St. Louis Cardinals organization.

== Amateur career ==
Kuhns attended Gettysburg Area High School in Gettysburg, Pennsylvania. As a senior in 2024, he had a 6–0 win–loss record, a 0.49 earned run average (ERA) and 79 strikeouts over 42 1/3 innings. He was ranked a top 100 prospect for the 2024 Major League Baseball draft but went unselected and instead enrolled at the University of Tennessee to play college baseball for the Tennessee Volunteers.

As a freshman for the Volunteers in 2025, Kuhns appeared in 15 games while making ten starts. He had a 2–4 record, a 5.40 ERA, and 40 strikeouts across 36 2/3 innings. After the season, he played in the Cape Cod Baseball League with the Brewster Whitecaps. He also played in one game for the Cashtown Pirates of the South Penn League. Kuhn was named to Tennessee's starting rotation for the 2026 season and had a career-high 15 strikeouts in May in a game versus the Texas Longhorns. He finished the 2026 season with a 5–5 record, a 3.56 ERA, and 106 strikeouts over 86 innings. After the season, he was invited to attend the 2026 MLB Draft Combine at Chase Field.

== Professional career ==
Kuhns was selected by the St. Louis Cardinals with the 32nd overall pick in the 2026 Major League Baseball draft. He signed with the Cardinals for a signing bonus of $3 million.
