= Lindsey Nelson Stadium =

Baseball park at University of Tennessee

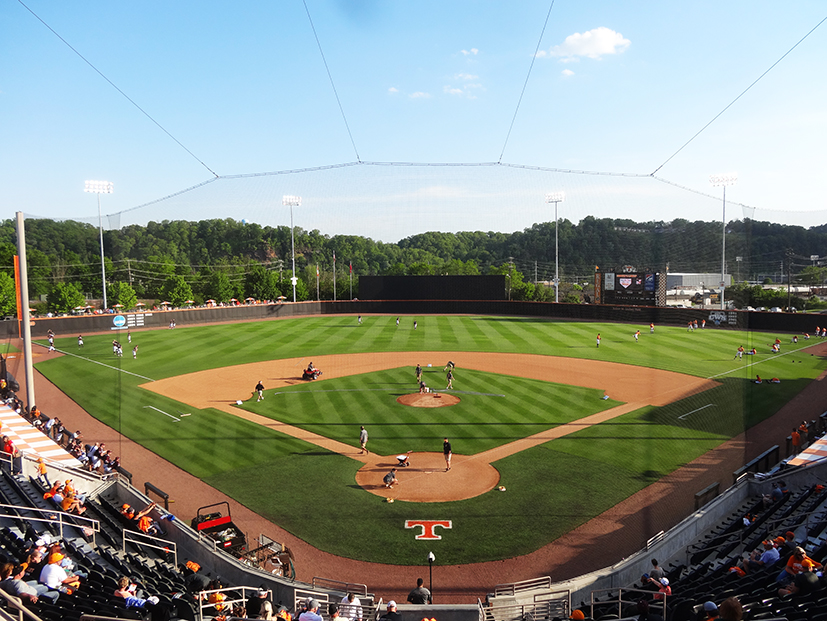
- Interactive map of Lindsey Nelson Stadium
- Address: 1511 Pat Head Summitt Drive; Knoxville, Tennessee; 37916
- Coordinates: 35°56′56″N 83°55′46″W
- Owner: University of Tennessee
- Operator: University of Tennessee
- Capacity: 8,012
- Type: Baseball
- Record attendance: 6,544 (vs. Texas A&M; April 4th, 2025)
- Field size: Left Field: 320 ft (98 m); Left-Center Field: 385 ft (117 m); Center Field: 390 ft (120 m); Right-Center Field: 365 ft (111 m); Right Field: 320 ft (98 m)

Construction
- Opened: 1993; 33 years ago
- Renovated: 2010; 16 years ago

Tenant
- Tennessee Volunteers baseball (1993-present)

Website
- Lindsey Nelson Stadium

Lindsey Nelson Stadium is a baseball stadium in Knoxville, Tennessee, United States. It is the home field of the University of Tennessee Volunteers college baseball team. The stadium opened on February 23, 1993 and holds 8,012 people. The facility is named after Hall of Fame broadcaster (Note: Nelson was inducted into two Halls of Fame for sportscasters and a two-time honoree of the National Baseball Hall of Fame and Museum.) Lindsey Nelson, who attended the university and founded the Vol Radio Network.

From 2006 to 2019, the university undertook three major renovations to the stadium. Originally a natural grass playing surface, the 2019 renovation converted the field to Field Turf. Other renovations included premium seating, outfield wall improvements, and player facilities.

In 2022, the Volunteers ranked 14th in among Division I baseball programs in attendance, averaging 4,230 per home game.

Lindsey Nelson Stadium is currently in the midst of an extensive renovation that will cost upwards of $100 million once it's complete. Originally planned as a three-year project with a finish date immediately preceding the start of the 2025 season, some unexpected utility work and a few other challenges during construction pushed the finish date to early 2026. The first phase of renovations included the addition of four-seat tabletop units along the right field line, a permanent net system, a new sound system, a new right field student section, renovated restrooms on the main concourse behind home plate, and enhanced seating behind home plate. Once complete, the second phase will add a new home plate entrance and plaza area, third level suites and club space, additional chairback seats under a new mezzanine level, restrooms and concessions along the first and third base lines, a left field bar on the main concourse, a new kitchen, a team merchandise shop and ticket office, a new player entry corridor, a fully completed mezzanine level, renovated concessions on the main concourse behind home plate, an expansion of the MVP Room, multiple elevators, and permanent LED lightning.

For the 2025 season, stadium capacity was around 6,200 with extra capacity for standing room. At the completion of the project, total capacity will increase to roughly 7,600.

== See also ==
- List of NCAA Division I baseball venues
