= AJ Russell =

American baseball player (born 2004)

Texas Rangers
- Pitcher
- Born: June 29, 2004 (age 22); Alexandria, Virginia, U.S.
- Bats: Right Throws: Right

Career highlights and awards
- College World Series champion (2024)

Andrew James Russell (born June 29, 2004) is an American professional baseball pitcher in the Texas Rangers organization. He was selected 52nd overall by the Rangers in the 2025 MLB draft.

== Amateur career ==
Russell attended Franklin High School in Franklin, Tennessee. Russell helped lead the Franklin Admirals to the Class 3A state playoffs as a junior in 2021 and was dominant on the mound as a senior in 2022, going 6-1 with a 1.14 ERA and 94 strikeouts in 49 1/3 innings of work after having a breakout junior season in 2021, posting a 3-0 record with a 0.63 ERA and 67 strikeouts in 44 1/3 innings pitched.

Russell pitched sparing as a freshman, though appearing in two College World Series elimination games. As a sophomore in 2024 with the Tennessee Volunteers of the Southeastern Conference (SEC), Russell pitched in three games before undergoing Tommy John surgery. He returned from injury during the SEC Tournament, pitching an inning against Vanderbilt. In 2025, Russell made six starts with 12 total appearances post-injury, striking out 36 over 25 1/3 innings of work.

== Professional career ==
Russell entered the 2025 Major League Baseball draft as a top pitching prospect. In the draft, Russell was selected by the Texas Rangers in the second round with the 52nd overall pick. He signed with the Rangers for a $2.6 million bonus on July 24, 2025.
