= Marcus Phillips (baseball) =

American baseball player (born 2004)

Boston Red Sox
- Pitcher
- Born: July 26, 2004 (age 22); Sioux Falls, South Dakota, U.S.
- Bats: Right Throws: Right

Career highlights and awards
- College World Series champion (2024)

Marcus Allen Phillips (born July 26, 2004) is an American professional baseball pitcher in the Boston Red Sox organization. He was selected 33rd overall in the 2025 MLB draft and signed with the Red Sox shortly thereafter. Phillips played college baseball for the Tennessee Volunteers.

== Amateur career ==
Phillips attended Roosevelt High School in Sioux Falls, South Dakota. He was a freshman at Iowa Western Community College in 2023, where as a two-way player he posted a 2–0 win–loss record across 12 1/3 innings pitched while striking out 11 batters, and at the plate had a .286 batting average. He then transferred to the University of Tennessee, where he focused on pitching.

As a sophomore in 2024 with the Tennessee Volunteers of the Southeastern Conference (SEC), Phillips appeared in 19 games (2 starts) while compiling a 4.95 earned run average (ERA); he struck out 22 batters in 20 innings and recorded three saves. The team went on to win the 2024 Men's College World Series. In 2025, Phillips started 17 games, and had a 4–5 record with a 3.90 ERA while striking out 98 batters in 83 innings.

== Professional career ==
Phillips entered the 2025 Major League Baseball draft as a top pitching prospect. In the draft, Phillips was selected by the Boston Red Sox with the 33rd overall pick. He signed with the Red Sox organization on July 20.
