= Dean Curley =

American baseball player (born 2004)

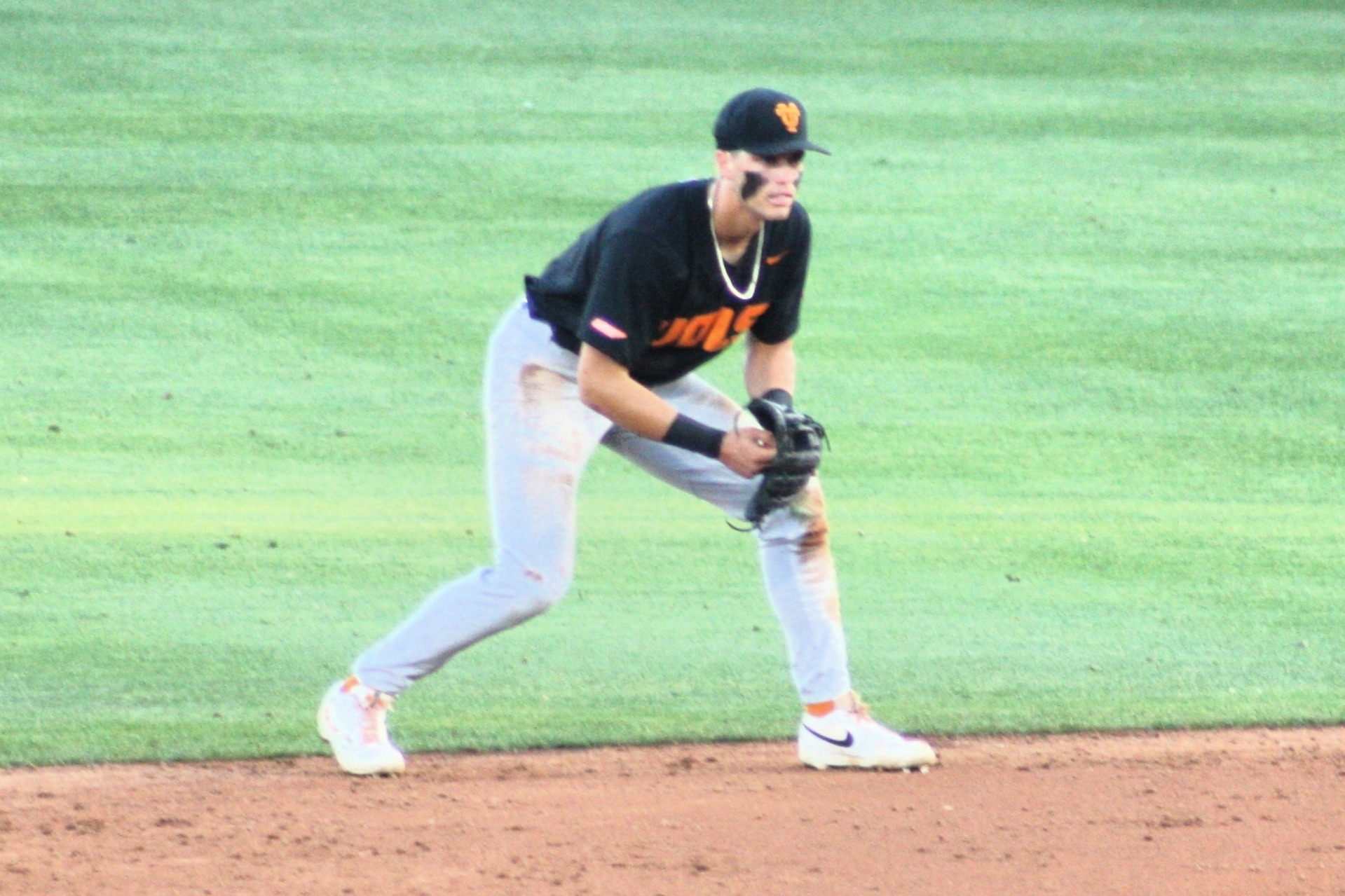
- Curley with Tennessee in 2025

Cleveland Guardians
- Shortstop
- Born: April 15, 2004 (age 22); Pomona, California, U.S.
- Bats: Right Throws: Right
- Stats at Baseball Reference

Career highlights and awards
- College World Series champion (2024)

Dean William Curley (born April 15, 2004) is an American professional baseball shortstop in the Cleveland Guardians organization.

== Amateur career ==
Curley attended Northview High School in Covina, California. He committed to the University of Tennessee to play college baseball.

Curley was Tennessee's starting shortstop his freshman year in 2024. Against Kansas State he became the first freshman in school history to hit three home runs in a game. He started 66 of 67 games, hitting .285/.386/.502 with 12 home runs and 50 runs batted in (RBI). He was named a Freshman All-American.

Curley entered 2025 as one of the top sophomore eligible prospects for the upcoming draft. He started the season again as the starting shortstop. Over 65 games, he hit .315 with 14 home runs and 51 RBIs.

== Professional career ==
Curley was selected 64th overall by the Cleveland Guardians in the 2025 Major League Baseball draft. He signed with the Guardians for $1.7 million.
