= 2024 Clemson Tigers baseball team =

American college baseball season

2024 Clemson Tigers baseball

Atlantic Division Regular Season Champions Clemson Regional champions

Clemson Super Regional, 0–2
- Conference: Atlantic Coast Conference

Ranking
- Coaches: No. 9
- Record: 44–16 (20–10 ACC)
- Head coach: Erik Bakich (2nd season)
- Assistant coaches: Nick Schnabel (2nd season); Jimmy Belanger (2nd season); Griffin Mazur (2nd season)
- Home stadium: Doug Kingsmore Stadium

2024 Atlantic Coast Conference baseball standings
	Conf.				Overall
Team	W		L	PCT	W		L	PCT
Atlantic
No. 9 Clemson ^{x}‍‍‍^{y}	20	–	10	.667	44	–	16	.733
No. 6 NC State ‍‍‍^{y}	18	–	11	.621	38	–	23	.623
No. 4 Florida State ‍‍‍^{y}	17	–	12	.586	49	–	17	.742
Louisville ‍‍‍	16	–	14	.533	32	–	24	.571
No. 19 Wake Forest ‍‍‍^{y}	15	–	15	.500	38	–	22	.633
Notre Dame ‍‍‍	9	–	21	.300	27	–	25	.519
Boston College ‍‍‍	8	–	22	.267	22	–	31	.415
Coastal
No. 5 North Carolina ^{x}‍‍‍^{y}	22	–	8	.733	48	–	16	.750
No. 7 Virginia ‍‍‍^{y}	18	–	12	.600	46	–	17	.730
No. 24 Duke ‍‍‡‍^{y}	16	–	14	.533	40	–	20	.667
Georgia Tech ‍‍‍^{y}	15	–	15	.500	33	–	25	.569
Virginia Tech ‍‍‍	14	–	16	.467	32	–	22	.593
Miami (FL) ‍‍‍	11	–	19	.367	26	–	30	.464
Pittsburgh ‍‍‍	10	–	20	.333	26	–	28	.481
x – Division champion ‡ – Tournament champion y – Invited to the NCAA Tournament; As of June 26, 2024; Rankings from D1Baseball

The 2024 Clemson Tigers baseball team were the varsity intercollegiate baseball team that represented Clemson University during the 2024 NCAA Division I baseball season. The Tigers competed in the Atlantic Coast Conference (ACC) and were led by second-year head coach Erik Bakich. Clemson played its home games at Doug Kingsmore Stadium in Clemson, South Carolina.

The Tigers started the season strongly, only losing one game in February, with their only loss coming in a 2–1 series win over Kennesaw State. The Tigers then went on an eleven-game winning streak, which extended from February 24 to March 13. The streak included two rivalry wins over number 19 South Carolina and a sweep of UNC Greensboro. The streak was ended with a loss at number 6 Duke, but the Tigers came back and won the series two games to one. The next big test for the Tigers was a series against number 12 Florida State. The Tigers swept the series, including a mercy-rule 15–5 win in the opener. They finished March 17–2. The team slowed down in April, finishing 10–6. They started with a sweep of Notre Dame before losing their first back-to-back games of the season on April 9 and 12. They lost their first series of the season on April 12–14, losing one game to two against NC State. The Tigers finished May 6–4. They won a series against Georgia Tech before getting swept by number 12 Wake Forest. They finished the regular season with a sweep of Boston College to end the season.

The Tigers finished the ACC regular season 40–13 and 20–10 in ACC play to finish as Atlantic Division champions. They were the second overall seed in the ACC tournament and were placed in pool B with Louisville and Miami. They lost to Miami 7–8 and defeated Louisville 8–7, but that was not enough to advance from the pool. They received an at-large bid to the NCAA tournament and were the sixth overall seed. They were selected as hosts of a Super Regional for the first time since 2010. They defeated High Point and Coastal Carolina twice to advance to the Super Regional. They lost twice to Florida and were unable to advance to the College World Series.

== Previous season ==
The Tigers started the season sluggishly going 4–4 in February and losing their first three ACC Series. They were 17–14 overall and 2–8 in the ACC as of April 6, after the first game of their series against Florida State. The Tigers won their next two games in the series and their season turned around. The Tigers only lost three more games during the regular season, and finished 39–17 overall and 20–10 in ACC play to finish in second place in the Atlantic Division. They went into the ACC tournament on a twelve-game winning streak and were the third seed. The Tigers were placed in a pool with sixth seed Boston College and tenth seed Virginia Tech. After going 2–0 in pool play, the Tigers defeated North Carolina in the Semifinals and Miami (FL) in the Final to win their eleventh ACC tournament title. The Tigers earned the ACC's automatic bid to the NCAA tournament and were selected as the fourth overall seed. They won the opening game of the regional against Lipscomb to extend their winning streak to seventeen games. Their streak ended there as they lost to Tennessee in fourteen innings. The Tigers could not overcome Charlotte in the elimination game of the regional and their season ended.

== Personnel ==
=== Roster ===
2024 Clemson Tigers roster
Pitchers: 00 - Drew Titsworth - Freshman; 13 - B.J. Bailey - Senior; 15 - Reed Garris - Junior; 18 - Tristan Smith - Sophomore; 19 - Aidan Knaak - Freshman; 20 - Nick Clayton - Graduate Student; 25 - Luke Brown - Freshman; 26 - Casey Tallent - Junior; 29 - Joe Allen - Sophomore; 30 - Billy Barlow - (redshirt) Sophomore; 31 - Jacob McGovern - Freshman; 33 - Justin LeGuernic - Freshman; 35 - Noah Samol - Sophomore; 36 - Matthew Marchal - Graduate Student; 37 - Jackson Cole - Freshman; 39 - Ethan Darden - Sophomore; 41 - Nathan Dvorsky - Sophomore; 47 - Lucas Mahlstedt - Junior; 48 - Rob Hughes - Graduate Student; 49 - Chance Fitzgerald - Freshman; 51 - Rocco Reid - Junior; 53 - Josh Davis - (redshirt) Sophomore; 56 - Austin Gordon - Junior	Catchers: 9 - Jacob Jarrell - Sophomore; 12 - Hideki Prather - Freshman; 44 - Ty Marshall - Freshman; Infielders: 2 - Nolan Nawrocki - (redshirt) Freshman; 4 - Cooper Blauser - (redshirt) Freshman; 5 - Andrew Ciufo - Graduate Student; 6 - Jacob Hinderleider - (redshirt) Senior; 8 - Blake Wright - Senior; 21 - Jay Dillard - (redshirt) Freshman; 23 - Jarren Purify - Freshman	Outfielders: 1 - Lleyton Lackey - Sophomore; 3 - Jack Crighton - Sophomore; 10 - Cam Cannarella - Sophomore; 16 - Will Taylor - Junior; 17 - Alden Mathes - Graduate Student; 22 - Nathan Hall - Sophomore; 27 - Tristan Bissetta - (redshirt) Sophomore; 42 – Devin Parks – Freshman; Utility: 11 - Jimmy Obertop - Graduate Student; 24 - Ty Olenchuk - Senior; 32 - Nick Couch - (redshirt) Junior; 40 - Brodey Conn - (redshirt) Freshman; 55 – Tryston McCladdie – Freshman

=== Coaching staff ===
2024 Clemson Tigers coaching staff
Name	Position	Seasons at Clemson
Erik Bakich	Head coach	2
Nick Schnabel	Assistant Coach	2
Jimmy Belanger	Assistant Coach	2
Griffin Mazur	Assistant Coach	2

== Schedule ==
Legend
	Clemson win
	Clemson loss
	Cancellation
**Bold**	Clemson team member
*	Non-Conference game
†	Make-Up Game

2024 Clemson Tigers baseball game log
Regular season

February (7–1)
Date	Time (ET)	Opponent	Rank	Site/stadium	Score	Win	Loss	Save	Attendance	Overall record	ACC record
Feb 16	4:00 p.m.	Xavier*	No. 10	Doug Kingsmore Stadium; Clemson, SC	**W** 14–3	**Barlow** (1–0)	Hoskins (0–1)	None	5,631	1–0	–
Feb 17	2:00 p.m.	Xavier*	No. 10	Doug Kingsmore Stadium	**W** 8–3	**Clayton** (1–0)	Hughes (0–1)	None	5,265	2–0	–
Feb 18	1:00 p.m.	Xavier*	No. 10	Doug Kingsmore Stadium	**W** 11–7	**Marchal** (1–0)	Hooker (0–1)	None	4,674	3–0	–
Feb 20	4:00 p.m.	Presbyterian*	No. 10	Doug Kingsmore Stadium	**W** 8–2	**Allen** (1–0)	Mueller (0–1)	None	4,307	4–0	–
Feb 23	5:00 p.m.	Kennesaw State*	No. 10	Doug Kingsmore Stadium	**L** 1–18	Osbolt (1–0)	**Barlow** (1–1)	None	4,869	4–1	–
Feb 24	2:00 p.m.	Kennesaw State	No. 10	Doug Kingsmore Stadium	**W** 8–6	**Darden** (1–0)	Eidson (0–1)	**Hughes** (1)	5,123	5–1	–
Feb 25	2:00 p.m.	Kennesaw State	No. 10	Doug Kingsmore Stadium	**W** 7–2	**Knaak** (1–0)	Pinson (0–2)	None	4,548	6–1	–
Feb 27	4:00 p.m.	USC Upstate*	No. 10	Doug Kingsmore Stadium	**W** 12–6	**Darden** (2–0)	Hodgdon (0–1)	None	4,035	7–1	–

March (17–2)
Date	Time (ET)	Opponent	Rank	Site/stadium	Score	Win	Loss	Save	Attendance	Overall record	ACC record
Mar 1	7:00 p.m.	at No. 19 South Carolina*; Rivalry	No. 10	Founders Park; Columbia, SC	Cancelled						
Mar 2	4:00 p.m.	vs No. 19 South Carolina*; Rivalry	No. 10	Segra Park; Columbia, SC	**W** 5–4 (12)	**Marchal** (2–0)	Gainey (0–1)	None	9,284	8–1	–
Mar 3	2:00 p.m.	No. 19 South Carolina*; Rivalry	No. 10	Doug Kingsmore Stadium	**W** 5–4	**Titsworth** (1–0)	Kimball (1–1)	**Gordon** (1)	6,124	9–1	–
Mar 6	6:00 p.m.	Kansas State*	No. 10	Doug Kingsmore Stadium	**W** 8–4	**Barlow** (2–1)	Evans (1–1)	None	3,855	10–1	–
Mar 8	4:00 p.m.	UNC Greensboro*	No. 10	Doug Kingsmore Stadium	**W** 12–5	**Reid** (1–0)	Chapman (1–1)	None	4,123	11–1	–
Mar 9	2:00 p.m.	UNC Greensboro*	No. 10	Doug Kingsmore Stadium	**W** 9–5	**Smith** (1–0)	Miller (0–1)	None	5,045	12–1	–
Mar 10	2:00 p.m.	UNC Greensboro*	No. 10	Doug Kingsmore Stadium	**W** 6–3	**Marchal** (3–0)	Thomas (1–1)	**Mahlstedt** (1)	5,156	13–1	–
Mar 12	4:00 p.m.	Manhattan*	No. 10	Doug Kingsmore Stadium	**W** 13–1 (7)	**Titsworth** (2–0)	Duffield (0–3)	None	4,145	14–1	–
Mar 13	4:00 p.m.	Manhattan*	No. 10	Doug Kingsmore Stadium	**W** 5–1	**Barlow** (3–1)	Garbinski (0–2)	None	4,217	15–1	–
Mar 15	4:00 p.m.	at No. 6 Duke	No. 10	Jack Coombs Field; Durham, NC	**L** 2–5	Santucci (4–0)	**Gordon** (0–1)	Beilenson (8)	762	15–2	0–1
Mar 16	3:00 p.m.	at No. 6 Duke	No. 10	Jack Coombs Field	**W** 8–7	**Smith** (2–0)	Nard (0–1)	**Hughes** (2)	1,801	16–2	1–1
Mar 17	1:00 p.m.	at No. 6 Duke	No. 10	Jack Coombs Field	**W** 8–6 (10)	**Hughes** (1–0)	Beilenson (0–1)	**Marchal** (1)	1,086	17–2	2–1
Mar 19	6:00 p.m.	Winthrop*	No. 4	Doug Kingsmore Stadium	**W** 13–3	**Marchal** (4–0)	Kuep (0–1)	None	3,865	18–2	–
Mar 20	6:00 p.m.	vs. Presbyterian	No. 4	Fluor Field; Greenville, SC	**W** 11–1 (8)	**Darden** (3–0)	Gibson (0–1)	None	2,744	19–2	–
Mar 23	1:00 p.m.	No. 12 Florida State	No. 4	Doug Kingsmore Stadium	**W** 15–5 (7)	**Darden** (4–0)	Leiter (4–1)	None	6,579	20–2	3–1
Mar 23	5:00 p.m.	No. 12 Florida State	No. 4	Doug Kingsmore Stadium	**W** 9–8	**McGovern** (1–0)	Dorsey (2–1)	None	6,579	21–2	4–1
Mar 24	1:00 p.m.	No. 12 Florida State	No. 4	Doug Kingsmore Stadium	**W** 14–12	**Mahlstedt** (1–0)	Dorsey (2–2)	**Hughes** (3)	4,843	22–2	5–1
Mar 26	4:00 p.m.	No. 19 Coastal Carolina*	No. 3	Doug Kingsmore Stadium	Cancelled						
Mar 28	7:00 p.m.	at Miami (FL)	No. 3	Alex Rodriguez Park; Coral Gables, FL	**L** 2–3	Ziehl (2–2)	**Hughes** (1–1)	None	3,069	22–3	5–2
Mar 29	7:00 p.m.	at Miami (FL)	No. 3	Alex Rodriguez Park	**W** 3–2	**Clayton** (2–0)	Schlesinger (2–2)	**Gordon** (2)	2,971	23–3	6–2
Mar 30	1:00 p.m.	at Miami (FL)	No. 3	Alex Rodriguez Park	**W** 7–0	**Knaak** (2–0)	H. Hernandez (2–3)	None	2,670	24–3	7–2

April (10–6)
Date	Time (ET)	Opponent	Rank	Site/stadium	Score	Win	Loss	Save	Attendance	Overall record	ACC record
Apr 2	6:00 p.m.	vs. USC Upstate*	No. 2	Fluor Field	**W** 11–1 (7)	**Barlow** (4–1)	Ellingworth (4–2)	None	4,109	25–3	–
Apr 5	4:30 p.m.	at Notre Dame	No. 2	Frank Eck Stadium; Notre Dame, IN	**W** 7–3	**Titsworth** (3–0)	Reeth (1–4)	**Gordon** (3)	559	26–3	8–2
Apr 6	2:00 p.m.	at Notre Dame	No. 2	Frank Eck Stadium	**W** 3–2	**Darden** (5–0)	Radel (2–1)	**Gordon** (4)	1,250	27–3	9–2
Apr 7	1:00 p.m.	at Notre Dame	No. 2	Frank Eck Stadium	**W** 13–12 (11)	**Reid** (2–0)	Lally Jr. (0–1)	None	663	28–3	10–2
Apr 9	6:00 p.m.	USC Upstate*	No. 2	Doug Kingsmore Stadium	**L** 5–9	Cubbler (2–1)	**LeGuernic** (0–1)	None	4,189	28–4	–
Apr 12	7:00 p.m.	NC State	No. 2	Doug Kingsmore Stadium	**L** 8–11	Van Dam (4–0)	**Reid** (2–1)	Smith (2)	5,123	28–5	10–3
Apr 13	3:00 p.m.	NC State	No. 2	Doug Kingsmore Stadium	**L** 0–4	Fritton (2–3)	**Darden** (5–1)	Smith (3)	5,286	28–6	10–4
Apr 14	1:00 p.m.	NC State	No. 2	Doug Kingsmore Stadium	**W** 7–0	**Knaak** (3–0)	Consiglio (1–3)	None	4,634	29–6	11–4
Apr 16	5:00 p.m.	Charlotte*	No. 6	Doug Kingsmore Stadium	**W** 8–5	**Mahlstedt** (2–0)	Langhorne (1–3)	**Gordon** (5)	4,567	30–6	–
Apr 19	6:00 p.m.	Pittsburgh	No. 6	Doug Kingsmore Stadium	**W** 6–4	**Mahlstedt** (3–0)	Fernandez (2–4	**Gordon** (6)	4,532	31–6	12–4
Apr 20	1:00 p.m.	Pittsburgh	No. 6	Doug Kingsmore Stadium	**L** 4–8	Sokol (4–2)	**Darden** (5–2)	None	—	31–7	12–5
Apr 20	5:00 p.m.	Pittsburgh	No. 6	Doug Kingsmore Stadium	**W** 9–2	**Knaak** (4–0)	Reed (0–5)	None	6,423	32–7	13–5
Apr 23	7:00 p.m.	at No. 20 Georgia*	No. 5	Foley Field; Athens, GA	**L** 3–4 (15)	Marsh (1–0)	**Fitzgerald** (0–1)	None	4,183	32–8	–
Apr 26	6:00 p.m.	at Louisville	No. 5	Jim Patterson Stadium; Louisville, KY	**W** 12–11	**Marchal** (5–0)	Biven (3–1)	**Gordon** (7)	2,819	33–8	14–5
Apr 27	1:00 p.m.	at Louisville	No. 5	Jim Patterson Stadium	**L** 6–7	Detmers (2–1)	**Garris** (0–1)	Corbett (1)	2,775	33–9	14–6
Apr 28	4:00 p.m.	at Louisville	No. 5	Jim Patterson Stadium	**W** 17–7 (7)	**Titsworth** (4–0)	Koger (1–3)	None	3,131	34–9	15–6

May (6–4)
Date	Time (ET)	Opponent	Rank	Site/stadium	Score	Win	Loss	Save	Attendance	Overall record	ACC record
May 3	12:00 p.m.	Georgia Tech	No. 4	Doug Kingsmore Stadium	**W** 11–4	**Mahlstedt** (4–0)	Finateri (5–2)	None	—	35–9	16–6
May 3	4:00 p.m.	Georgia Tech	No. 4	Doug Kingsmore Stadium	**L** 12–14	Patel (2–2)	**Gordon** (0–1)	None	6,498	35–10	16–7
May 5	1:00 p.m.	Georgia Tech	No. 4	Doug Kingsmore Stadium	**W** 9–3	**Barlow** (5–1)	McKee (4–4)	None	4,623	36–10	17–7
May 7	6:00 p.m.	vs. Charlotte*	No. 2	Truist Field; Charlotte, NC	**W** 14–12	**McGovern** (2–0)	J. Taylor (2–2)	**Gordon** (8)	4,265	37–10	–
May 10	6:00 p.m.	at No. 12 Wake Forest	No. 2	David F. Couch Ballpark; Winston-Salem, NC	**L** 2–4	Burns (10–1)	**Darden** (5–3)	Roland (5)	3,514	37–11	17–8
May 11	4:00 p.m.	at No. 12 Wake Forest	No. 2	David F. Couch Ballpark	**L** 5–8	Ariola (1–0)	**Mahlstedt** (4–1)	Roland (6)	3,514	37–12	17–9
May 12	1:00 p.m.	at No. 12 Wake Forest	No. 2	David F. Couch Ballpark	**L** 3–13 (8)	Hartle (6–2)	**Knaak** (4–1)	None	2,645	37–13	17–10
May 14	4:00 p.m.	at Coastal Carolina*	No. 4	Springs Brooks Stadium; Conway, SC	Cancelled						
May 16	6:00 p.m.	Boston College	No. 4	Doug Kingsmore Stadium	**W** 12–10	**Garris** (1–1)	Mudd (2–3)	**Gordon** (9)	4,356	38–13	18–10
May 17	1:00 p.m.	Boston College	No. 4	Doug Kingsmore Stadium	**W** 11–6	**Barlow** (6–1)	Colarusso (3–8)	None	4,289	39–13	19–10
May 18	12:00 p.m.	Boston College	No. 4	Doug Kingsmore Stadium	**W** 10–0 (8)	**Knaak** (5–1)	Farinelli (0–6)	None	4,532	40–13	20–10

Postseason

ACC Tournament (1–1)
Date	Time	Opponent	Seed/Rank	Site/stadium	Score	Win	Loss	Save	Attendance	Overall record	Tournament record
May 23	11:00 a.m.	vs. Miami (FL)	(2) No. 3	Truist Field	**L** 7–8	Ziehl (5–3)	**Darden** (5–4)	Caba (5)	3,907	40–14	0–1
May 24	3:00 p.m.	vs. Louisville	(2) No. 3	Truist Field	**W** 8–7	**Gordon** (1–2)	Biven (4–2)	None	4,782	41–14	1–1

NCAA Tournament Clemson Regional (3–0)
Date	Time	Opponent Seed	Opponent	Seed/Rank	Site/stadium	Score	Win	Loss	Save	Attendance	Overall record	Clemson Regional record
May 31	7:00 p.m.	(4)	High Point	(1) No. 3	Doug Kingsmore Stadium	**W** 4–3	**Gordon** (2–2)	Grintz (2–1)	None	6,256	42–14	1–0
June 1	5:00 p.m.	(3)	Coastal Carolina	(1) No. 3	Doug Kingsmore Stadium	**W** 4–3	**McGovern** (3–0)	Flukey (3–3)	**Gordon** (10)	6,406	43–14	2–0
June 2	6:00 p.m.	(3)	Coastal Carolina	(1) No. 3	Doug Kingsmore Stadium	**W** 12–5	**Garris** (2–1)	Hinkel (1–3)	**Gordon** (11)	6,061	44–14	3–0

NCAA Tournament Clemson Super Regional (0–2)
Date	Time	Opponent	Seed/Rank	Site/stadium	Score	Win	Loss	Save	Attendance	Overall record	Super Regional record
June 8	2:00 p.m.	Florida	(6) No. 3	Doug Kingsmore Stadium	**L** 7–10	**Jameson** (5–0)	**Smith** (2–1)	**Neely** (4)	6,492	44–15	0–1
June 9	2:30 p.m.	Florida	(6) No. 3	Doug Kingsmore Stadium	**L** 10–11 (13)	**McNeillie** (4–6)	**Darden** (5–5)	None	6,423	44–16	0–2

Note: All rankings shown are from D1Baseball Poll.

== Rankings ==
Ranking movements Legend: ██ Increase in ranking ██ Decrease in ranking ( ) = First-place votes
	Week																
Poll	Pre	1	2	3	4	5	6	7	8	9	10	11	12	13	14	15	Final
Coaches'	9	9*	11	9	9	5	3 (1)	2	2	6	4	4	4	7	5	6	9
Baseball America	9	9	10	10	9	3	2	2	2	4	4	4	4	10	10	10	11
NCBWA†	12	8	11	9	8	3	3	2	2	6	4	4	3	7	4	6	9
D1Baseball	10	10	10	10	10	4	3	2	2	6	5	4	2	4	3	3	9
Perfect Game	21	18	16	12	10	4	2	2	2	5	4	4	3	9	6	6*	9

† NCBWA ranks 30 teams in their preseason poll, but only ranks 25 teams weekly during the season.
* A new poll was not released for this week, so for comparison purposes, the previous week's ranking is inserted in this week's slot.
