= 2024 NCAA Division I baseball tournament =

American college sports championship

- Season: 2024
- Teams: 64
- Finals site: Charles Schwab Field Omaha; Omaha, Nebraska
- Champions: Tennessee (1st title)
- Runner-up: Texas A&M (8th CWS Appearance)
- Winning coach: Tony Vitello (1st title)
- MOP: Dylan Dreiling (Tennessee)
- Attendance: 506,767
- Television: ABC; ESPN; ESPN2; ESPNU; ACCN; SECN; LHN; ESPN+

The 2024 NCAA Division I baseball tournament was the 77th edition of the NCAA Division I Baseball Championship, won by Tennessee in a closely contested final series with Texas A&M. The 64-team tournament began on Friday, May 31, as part of the 2024 NCAA Division I baseball season and ended with the 2024 Men's College World Series in Omaha, Nebraska, which began on June 14 and ended on June 24.

The 64 participating NCAA Division I college baseball teams were selected from an eligible 300 teams. 30 teams were awarded automatic bids as champions of their conferences, and 34 teams were selected at-large by the NCAA Division I Baseball Committee. Teams were then divided into sixteen regionals of four teams, each of which was conducted via a double-elimination tournament. Regional champions advanced to face each other in Super Regionals, a best-of-three-game series, to determine the eight participants in the Men's College World Series.

== Tournament procedure ==
A total of 64 teams entered the tournament, with 30 of them receiving an automatic bid by either winning their conference's tournament or by finishing in first place in their conference. The remaining 34 bids were at-large, with selections extended by the NCAA Selection Committee.

== National seeds ==
The sixteen national seeds were announced on the Selection Show on May 27. Teams in italics advanced to the Super Regionals. Teams in bold advanced to the 2024 Men's College World Series.

1. **Tennessee**
2. **Kentucky**
3. **Texas A&M**
4. **North Carolina**
5. Arkansas
6. Clemson
7. Georgia
8. **Florida State**
9. Oklahoma
10. **NC State**
11. Oklahoma State
12. **Virginia**
13. Arizona
14. UC Santa Barbara
15. Oregon State
16. East Carolina

== Schedule and venues ==
On May 26, the NCAA Division I Baseball Committee announced the sixteen regional host sites.

Regionals

- May 31–June 3
  - Foley Field, Athens, Georgia (Host: University of Georgia)
  - Boshamer Stadium, Chapel Hill, North Carolina (Host: University of North Carolina)
  - Davenport Field at Disharoon Park, Charlottesville, Virginia (Host: University of Virginia)
  - Doug Kingsmore Stadium, Clemson, South Carolina (Host: Clemson University)
  - Olsen Field at Blue Bell Park, College Station, Texas (Host: Texas A&M University)
  - Goss Stadium at Coleman Field, Corvallis, Oregon (Host: Oregon State University)
  - Baum–Walker Stadium, Fayetteville, Arkansas (Host: University of Arkansas)
  - Clark–LeClair Stadium, Greenville, North Carolina (Host: East Carolina University)
  - Lindsey Nelson Stadium, Knoxville, Tennessee, (Host: University of Tennessee)
  - Kentucky Proud Park, Lexington, Kentucky (Host: University of Kentucky)
  - L. Dale Mitchell Baseball Park, Norman, Oklahoma (Host: University of Oklahoma)
  - Doak Field, Raleigh, North Carolina (Host: North Carolina State University)
  - Caesar Uyesaka Stadium, Santa Barbara, California (Host: University of California, Santa Barbara)
  - O'Brate Stadium, Stillwater, Oklahoma (Host: Oklahoma State University)
  - Mike Martin Field at Dick Howser Stadium, Tallahassee, Florida (Host: Florida State University)
  - Hi Corbett Field, Tucson, Arizona (Host: University of Arizona)

Super Regionals

- June 7–9
  - Boshamer Stadium, Chapel Hill, North Carolina (Host: University of North Carolina)
  - Davenport Field at Disharoon Park, Charlottesville, Virginia (Host: University of Virginia)
  - Lindsey Nelson Stadium, Knoxville, Tennessee, (Host:University of Tennessee)
  - Mike Martin Field at Dick Howser Stadium, Tallahassee, Florida (Host: Florida State University)
- June 8–10
  - Foley Field, Athens, Georgia (Host: University of Georgia)
  - Doug Kingsmore Stadium, Clemson, South Carolina (Host: Clemson University)
  - Olsen Field at Blue Bell Park, College Station, Texas (Host: Texas A&M University)
  - Kentucky Proud Park, Lexington, Kentucky (Host: University of Kentucky)

Men's College World Series

- June 14–24
  - Charles Schwab Field Omaha, Omaha, Nebraska, (Host: Creighton University)

== Bids ==
=== Automatic bids ===
School	Conference	Record (Conf)	Berth	Last NCAA Appearance
Bryant	America East	36–19 (17–7)	Tournament	2016 (Charlottesville Regional)
Tulane	American	35–24 (15–12)	Tournament	2023 (Baton Rouge Regional)
Stetson	ASUN	40–20 (20–10)	Tournament	2018 (Chapel Hill Super Regional)
Duke	ACC	39–18 (16–14)	Tournament	2023 (Charlottesville Super Regional)
VCU	Atlantic 10	37–21 (15–8)	Tournament	2022 (Chapel Hill Regional)
Oklahoma State	Big 12	37–16 (19–9)	Tournament	2023 (Stillwater Regional)
St. John's	Big East	37–16–1 (14–7)	Tournament	2018 (Clemson Regional)
High Point	Big South	34–25 (17–7)	Tournament	First Appearance
Nebraska	Big Ten	39–20 (16–8)	Tournament	2021 (Fayetteville Regional)
UC Santa Barbara	Big West	42–12 (26–4)	Regular season	2022 (Stanford Regional)
UNC Wilmington	CAA	39–19 (20–7)	Tournament	2023 (Conway Regional)
Dallas Baptist	CUSA	44–13 (17–7)	Tournament	2023 (Stillwater Regional)
Northern Kentucky	Horizon	35–22 (19–11)	Tournament	First Appearance
Penn	Ivy League	24–23 (11–10)	Tournament	2023 (Auburn Regional)
Niagara	MAAC	38–15 (20–4)	Tournament	First Appearance
Western Michigan	MAC	32–21 (19–11)	Tournament	2016 (Louisville Regional)
Evansville	Missouri Valley	35–23 (17–10)	Tournament	2006 (Charlottesville Regional)
Fresno State	Mountain West	33–27 (16–14)	Tournament	2019 (Stanford Regional)
LIU	Northeast	33–23 (24–9)	Tournament	2022 (College Park Regional)
Southeast Missouri State	Ohio Valley	34–25 (18–9)	Tournament	2022 (Louisville Regional)
Arizona	Pac-12	36–21 (20–10)	Tournament	2023 (Fayetteville Regional)
Army	Patriot	31–21 (16–8)	Tournament	2023 (Charlottesville Regional)
Tennessee	SEC	50–11 (22–8)	Tournament	2023 Men's College World Series
Wofford	SoCon	41–18 (12–8)	Tournament	2007 (Columbia, SC Regional)
Nicholls	Southland	38–20 (16–8)	Tournament	2023 (Tuscaloosa Regional)
Grambling State	SWAC	26–26 (18–8)	Tournament	2010 (Fayetteville Regional)
Oral Roberts	Summit	27–30–1 (13–15–1)	Tournament	2023 Men's College World Series
Southern Miss	Sun Belt	41–18 (20–10)	Tournament	2023 (Hattiesburg Super Regional)
San Diego	West Coast	40–13 (20–4)	Tournament	2022 (Corvallis Regional)
Grand Canyon (Note: Tarleton won the WAC tournament, but was ineligible for the NCAA tournament due to its ongoing transition from Division II. Grand Canyon, the top seed in tournament, received the berth.)	WAC	34–23 (23–7)	Tournament	2022 (Stillwater Regional)

=== At-large ===
Team	Conference	Record (Conf)	Last NCAA Appearance
Alabama	SEC	33–22 (13–17)	2023 (Winston-Salem Super Regional)
Arkansas	SEC	43–13 (20–10)	2023 (Arkansas Regional)
Clemson	ACC	40–13 (20–10)	2023 (Clemson Regional)
Coastal Carolina	Sun Belt	34–23 (16–14)	2023 (Conway Regional)
East Carolina	American	43–15 (19–8)	2023 (Charlottesville Regional)
Florida	SEC	28–27 (13–17)	2023 Men's College World Series
Florida State	ACC	42–15 (17–12)	2022 (Auburn Regional)
Georgia	SEC	39–15 (17–13)	2022 (Chapel Hill Regional)
Georgia Tech	ACC	31–23 (15–15)	2022 (Knoxville Regional)
Illinois	Big Ten	34–19 (18–6)	2019 (Oxford Regional)
Indiana	Big Ten	32–24–1 (15–9)	2023 (Lexington Regional)
Indiana State	Missouri Valley	42–13 (22–5)	2023 (Fort Worth Super Regional)
James Madison	Sun Belt	34–23 (17–13)	2011 (Chapel Hill Regional)
Kansas State	Big 12	32–24 (15–15)	2013 (Corvallis Super Regional)
Kentucky	SEC	40–14 (22–8)	2023 (Baton Rouge Super Regional)
Louisiana	Sun Belt	40–18 (23–7)	2023 (Coral Gables Regional)
Louisiana Tech	CUSA	45–17 (18–6)	2022 (Austin Regional)
LSU	SEC	40–21 (13–17)	2023 Men's College World Series
Mississippi State	SEC	38–21 (17–13)	2021 Men's College World Series
NC State	ACC	33–20 (18–11)	2023 (Columbia Regional)
North Carolina	ACC	42–13 (22–8)	2023 (Indiana State Regional)
Oklahoma	Big 12	37–19 (23–7)	2023 (Charlottesville Super Regional)
Oregon	Pac-12	37–18 (19–11)	2023 (Eugene Super Regional)
Oregon State	Pac-12	42–14 (19–10)	2023 (Baton Rouge Regional)
South Carolina	SEC	36–23 (13–17)	2023 (Gainesville Super Regional)
Texas	Big 12	35–22 (20–10)	2023 (Stanford Super Regional)
Texas A&M	SEC	44–13 (19–11)	2023 (Stanford Regional)
UC Irvine	Big West	43–12 (22–8)	2021 (Stanford Regional)
UCF	Big 12	35–19 (14–15)	2017 (Tallahassee Regional)
UConn	Big East	32–23 (17–4)	2023 (Gainesville Regional)
Vanderbilt	SEC	38–21 (13–17)	2023 (Nashville Regional)
Virginia	ACC	41–15 (18–12)	2023 Men's College World Series
Wake Forest	ACC	38–20 (15–15)	2023 Men's College World Series
West Virginia	Big 12	33–22 (19–11)	2023 (Lexington Regional)

=== By conference ===
Conference	Total	Schools
SEC	11	Alabama, Arkansas, Florida, Georgia, Kentucky, LSU, Mississippi State, South Carolina, Tennessee, Texas A&M, Vanderbilt
ACC	8	Clemson, Duke, Florida State, Georgia Tech, North Carolina, NC State, Virginia, Wake Forest
Big 12	6	Kansas State, Oklahoma, Oklahoma State, Texas, UCF, West Virginia
Sun Belt	4	Coastal Carolina, James Madison, Louisiana, Southern Miss
Pac-12	3	Arizona, Oregon, Oregon State
Big Ten	3	Illinois, Indiana, Nebraska
American	2	East Carolina, Tulane
Big East	2	St. John’s, UConn
Big West	2	UC Irvine, UC Santa Barbara
CUSA	2	Dallas Baptist, Louisiana Tech
Missouri Valley	2	Evansville, Indiana State
Coastal	1	UNC Wilmington
ASUN	1	Stetson
America East	1	Bryant
Atlantic 10	1	VCU
Big South	1	High Point
Horizon	1	Northern Kentucky
Ivy League	1	Penn
Metro Atlantic	1	Niagara
Mid-American	1	Western Michigan
Mountain West	1	Fresno State
Northeast	1	LIU
Ohio Valley	1	Southeast Missouri State
Patriot	1	Army
Southern	1	Wofford
Southland	1	Nicholls
SWAC	1	Grambling State
Summit	1	Oral Roberts
WAC	1	Grand Canyon
WCC	1	San Diego

== Regionals and Super Regionals ==
Bold indicates winner. Seeds for regional tournaments indicate seeds within regional. Seeds for super regional tournaments indicate national seeds only.

=== Chapel Hill Super Regional ===
Hosted by North Carolina at Boshamer Stadium

Regional	Regional
1	Arizona	4
**4**	**Grand Canyon**	**9**
4	Grand Canyon	2
**3**	**West Virginia**	**5**
**3**	**West Virginia**	**4**
2	Dallas Baptist	1
Tucson Regional – Hi Corbett Field
1	Arizona	0
**2**	**Dallas Baptist**	**7**
2	Dallas Baptist	10
**4**	**Grand Canyon**	**12**
**1**	**North Carolina**	**11**
4	LIU	8
**1**	**North Carolina**	**6**
2	LSU	2
3	Wofford	3
**2**	**LSU**	**4**
Chapel Hill Regional – Boshamer Stadium
4	LIU	2
**3**	**Wofford**	**5**
3	Wofford	6
**2**	**LSU**	**13**

Regional Final
**3**	**West Virginia**	**10**	–
4	Grand Canyon	6	–
**1**	**North Carolina**	4	**4^{10}**
2	LSU	**8**	3

Super Regional; June 7–9
West Virginia	6	1	–
**4**	**North Carolina**	**8**	**2**	–

=== Charlottesville Super Regional ===
Hosted by Virginia at Davenport Field at Disharoon Park

Regional	Regional
**1**	**Arkansas**	**17**
4	Southeast Missouri State	9
1	Arkansas	6
**3**	**Kansas State**	**7**
**3**	**Kansas State**	**19**
2	Louisiana Tech	4
Fayetteville Regional – Baum–Walker Stadium
**4**	**Southeast Missouri State**	**9**
2	Louisiana Tech	3
**4**	**Southeast Missouri State**	**6**
1	Arkansas	3
**1**	**Virginia**	**4**
4	Penn	2
**1**	**Virginia**	**5**
2	Mississippi State	4
3	St. John's	2
**2**	**Mississippi State**	**5^{10}**
Charlottesville Regional – Davenport Field at Disharoon Park
4	Penn	9
**3**	**St. John's**	**10^{12}**
3	St. John's	5
**2**	**Mississippi State**	**13**

Regional Final
**3**	**Kansas State**	**7**	–
4	Southeast Missouri State	2	–
**1**	**Virginia**	**9**	–
2	Mississippi State	2	–

Super Regional; June 7–9
Kansas State	4	4	–
**12**	**Virginia**	**7**	**10**	–

=== Knoxville Super Regional ===
Hosted by Tennessee at Lindsey Nelson Stadium

Regional	Regional
**1**	**Tennessee**	**9**
4	Northern Kentucky	3
**1**	**Tennessee**	**12**
3	Indiana	6
**3**	**Indiana**	**10**
2	Southern Miss	4
Knoxville Regional – Lindsey Nelson Stadium
4	Northern Kentucky	0
**2**	**Southern Miss**	**6**
**2**	**Southern Miss**	**15**
3	Indiana	3
1	East Carolina	1
**4**	**Evansville**	**4**
**4**	**Evansville**	**17**
3	VCU	11
**3**	**VCU**	**1**
2	Wake Forest	0
Greenville Regional – Clark–LeClair Stadium
**1**	**East Carolina**	**7**
2	Wake Forest	6
**1**	**East Carolina**	**10**
3	VCU	7

Regional Final
**1**	**Tennessee**	**12**	–
2	Southern Miss	3	–
**4**	**Evansville**	6	**6**
1	East Carolina	**19**	5

Super Regional; June 7–9
**1**	**Tennessee**	**11**	8	**12**
Evansville	6	**10**	1

=== Tallahassee Super Regional ===
Hosted by Florida State at Dick Howser Stadium

Regional	Regional
**1**	**Oklahoma**	**14**
4	Oral Roberts	0
1	Oklahoma	1
**3**	**UConn**	**4**
**3**	**UConn**	**4**
2	Duke	1
Norman Regional – L. Dale Mitchell Baseball Park
4	Oral Roberts	2
**2**	**Duke**	**6**
2	Duke	3
**1**	**Oklahoma**	**4**
**1**	**Florida State**	**7**
4	Stetson	2
**1**	**Florida State**	**5**
3	UCF	2
**3**	**UCF**	**8**
2	Alabama	7
Tallahassee Regional – Dick Howser Stadium
**4**	**Stetson**	**4**
2	Alabama	0
4	Stetson	2
**3**	**UCF**	**5**

Regional Final
**3**	**UConn**	4	**7**
1	Oklahoma	**6**	1
**1**	**Florida State**	**12**	–
3	UCF	4	–

Super Regional; June 7–9
UConn	4	8	–
**8**	**Florida State**	**24**	**10^{12}**	–

=== Lexington Super Regional ===
Hosted by Kentucky at Kentucky Proud Park

Regional	Regional
**1**	**Kentucky**	**10**
4	Western Michigan	8
**1**	**Kentucky**	**6**
3	Illinois	1
**3**	**Illinois**	**4**
2	Indiana State	1
Lexington Regional – Kentucky Proud Park
4	Western Michigan	4
**2**	**Indiana State**	**6**
**2**	**Indiana State**	**13**
3	Illinois	2
**1**	**Oregon State**	**10**
4	Tulane	4
**1**	**Oregon State**	**5**
2	UC Irvine	3
3	Nicholls	12
**2**	**UC Irvine**	**13**
Corvallis Regional – Goss Stadium at Coleman Field
**4**	**Tulane**	**3**
3	Nicholls	0
4	Tulane	7
**2**	**UC Irvine**	**17**

Regional Final
**1**	**Kentucky**	**5**	–
2	Indiana State	0	–
**1**	**Oregon State**	**11**	–
2	UC Irvine	6	–

Super Regional; June 8–10
**2**	**Kentucky**	**10**	**3**	–
15	Oregon State	0	2	–

=== Athens Super Regional ===
Hosted by Georgia at Foley Field

Regional	Regional
**1**	**NC State**	**9**
4	Bryant	2
**1**	**NC State**	**6**
2	South Carolina	4
3	James Madison	7
**2**	**South Carolina**	**8^{10}**
Raleigh Regional – Doak Field
4	Bryant	1
**3**	**James Madison**	**8**
**3**	**James Madison**	**2**
2	South Carolina	0
**1**	**Georgia**	**8**
4	Army	7
**1**	**Georgia**	**11**
2	UNC Wilmington	2
3	Georgia Tech	0
**2**	**UNC Wilmington**	**9**
Athens Regional – Foley Field
4	Army	2
**3**	**Georgia Tech**	**4**
**3**	**Georgia Tech**	**3**
2	UNC Wilmington	1

Regional Final
**1**	**NC State**	**5**	–
3	James Madison	3	–
**1**	**Georgia**	**8**	–
3	Georgia Tech	6	–

Super Regional; June 8–10
**10**	**NC State**	**18**	2	**8**
7	Georgia	1	**11**	5

=== Bryan-College Station Super Regional ===
Hosted by Texas A&M at Blue Bell Park

Regional	Regional
**1**	**UC Santa Barbara**	**9**
4	Fresno State	6
1	UC Santa Barbara	1
**3**	**Oregon**	**2**
**3**	**Oregon**	**5**
2	San Diego	4^{11}
Santa Barbara Regional – Caesar Uyesaka Stadium
4	Fresno State	5
**2**	**San Diego**	**7**
2	San Diego	2
**1**	**UC Santa Barbara**	**4**
**1**	**Texas A&M**	**8**
4	Grambling State	0
**1**	**Texas A&M**	**4**
3	Texas	2^{11}
**3**	**Texas**	**12**
2	Louisiana	5
Bryan-College Station Regional – Blue Bell Park
4	Grambling State	5
**2**	**Louisiana**	**12**
**2**	**Louisiana**	**10**
3	Texas	2

Regional Final
**3**	**Oregon**	**3**	–
1	UC Santa Barbara	0	–
**1**	**Texas A&M**	**9**	–
2	Louisiana	4	–

Super Regional; June 8–10
Oregon	6	9	–
**3**	**Texas A&M**	**10**	**15**	–

=== Clemson Super Regional ===
Hosted by Clemson University at Doug Kingsmore Stadium

Regional	Regional
**1**	**Clemson**	**4**
4	High Point	3
**1**	**Clemson**	**4**
3	Coastal Carolina	3
**3**	**Coastal Carolina**	**13**
2	Vanderbilt	3
Clemson Regional – Doug Kingsmore Stadium
**4**	**High Point**	**10**
2	Vanderbilt	9
4	High Point	5
**3**	**Coastal Carolina**	**6**
**1**	**Oklahoma State**	**19**
4	Niagara	7
**1**	**Oklahoma State**	**7**
3	Florida	1
**3**	**Florida**	**5**
2	Nebraska	2
Stillwater Regional – O'Brate Stadium
4	Niagara	5
**2**	**Nebraska**	**7**
2	Nebraska	11
**3**	**Florida**	**17**

Regional Final
**1**	**Clemson**	**12**	–
3	Coastal Carolina	5	–
1	Oklahoma State	2	2
**3**	**Florida**	**5**	**4**

Super Regional; June 8–10
6	Clemson	7	10	–
**Florida**	**10**	**11^{13}**	–

== Men's College World Series ==
The Men's College World Series was held at Charles Schwab Field in Omaha, Nebraska.

=== Participants ===
School	Conference	Record (Conf)	Head Coach	Super Regional	Previous MCWS Appearances	Previous MCWS Best Finish	Previous MCWS W–L Record
Tennessee	SEC	55–12 (22–8)	Tony Vitello	Knoxville	6 (last: 2023)	2nd (1951)	9–12
Florida State	ACC	47–15 (17–12)	Link Jarrett	Tallahassee	23 (last: 2019)	2nd (1970, 1986, 1999)	30–46
North Carolina	ACC	47–14 (22–8)	Scott Forbes	Chapel Hill	11 (last: 2018)	2nd (2006, 2007)	18–23
Virginia	ACC	46–15 (18–12)	Brian O'Connor	Charlottesville	6 (last: 2023)	1st (2015)	13–12
Kentucky	SEC	45–14 (22–8)	Nick Mingione	Lexington	None		0–0
NC State	ACC	38–21 (18–11)	Elliott Avent	Athens	3 (last: 2021)	3rd (1968, 2021)	5–5
Florida	SEC	34–28 (13–17)	Kevin O'Sullivan	Clemson	13 (last: 2023)	1st (2017)	25–25
Texas A&M	SEC	49–13 (19–11)	Jim Schlossnagle	College Station	7 (last: 2022)	3rd (2022)	4–14

=== Bracket ===
First round	Second round
**4**	**North Carolina**	**3**
12	Virginia	2
4	North Carolina	1
**1**	**Tennessee**	**6**
**1**	**Tennessee**	**12**
8	Florida State	11
Bracket 1
12	Virginia	3
**8**	**Florida State**	**7**
**8**	**Florida State**	**9**
4	North Carolina	5
**2**	**Kentucky**	**5^{10}**
10	NC State	4
2	Kentucky	1
**3**	**Texas A&M**	**5**
**3**	**Texas A&M**	**3**
Florida	2
Bracket 2
10	NC State	4
**Florida**	**5**
**Florida**	**15**
2	Kentucky	4

Semifinals
**1**	**Tennessee**	**7**	−
8	Florida State	2	−
**3**	**Texas A&M**	**6**	−
Florida	0	−

Finals
**1**	**Tennessee**	5	**4**	**6**
3	Texas A&M	**9**	1	5

=== Game results ===
==== Bracket 1 ====
June 14, 2024; 1:00 pm CDT (UTC-5); Game 1	**No. 4 North Carolina**	**3–2**	No. 12 Virginia	Charles Schwab Field Omaha; Attendance: 23,990; Umpires: HP:Scott Cline; 1B: Mike Morris; 2B: Kellen Levy; 3B: David Uyl
June 14, 2024; 1:00 pm CDT (UTC-5); Game 1	WP: Dalton Pence (5–1)	Box Score	LP: Chase Hungate (7–2)	Charles Schwab Field Omaha; Attendance: 23,990; Umpires: HP:Scott Cline; 1B: Mike Morris; 2B: Kellen Levy; 3B: David Uyl

June 14, 2024; 6:00 pm CDT (UTC-5); Game 2	**No. 1 Tennessee**	**12–11**	No. 8 Florida State	Charles Schwab Field Omaha; Attendance: 25,499; Umpires: HP: Grady Smith; 1B: Jake Uhlenhopp; 2B: Linus Baker; 3B: Shawn Rakos
June 14, 2024; 6:00 pm CDT (UTC-5); Game 2	WP: Nate Snead (10–2)	Box Score	LP: Brennen Oxford (2–1)	Charles Schwab Field Omaha; Attendance: 25,499; Umpires: HP: Grady Smith; 1B: Jake Uhlenhopp; 2B: Linus Baker; 3B: Shawn Rakos
June 14, 2024; 6:00 pm CDT (UTC-5); Game 2	HR: Moore (33), Tears (19)	Box Score	HR: Ferrer (20)	Charles Schwab Field Omaha; Attendance: 25,499; Umpires: HP: Grady Smith; 1B: Jake Uhlenhopp; 2B: Linus Baker; 3B: Shawn Rakos

June 16, 2024; 1:00 pm CDT (UTC-5); Game 5	No. 12 Virginia	**3–7**	**No. 8 Florida State**	Charles Schwab Field Omaha; Attendance: 29,989; Umpires: HP: Linus Baker; 1B: Shawn Rakos; 2B: Grady Smith; 3B: Jake Uhlenhopp
June 16, 2024; 1:00 pm CDT (UTC-5); Game 5	LP: Jay Woolfolk (4–2)	Box Score	WP: Carson Dorsey (8–4)	Charles Schwab Field Omaha; Attendance: 29,989; Umpires: HP: Linus Baker; 1B: Shawn Rakos; 2B: Grady Smith; 3B: Jake Uhlenhopp
June 16, 2024; 1:00 pm CDT (UTC-5); Game 5		Box Score	HR: Ferrer (21), Ferrer (22), Lodise (8)	Charles Schwab Field Omaha; Attendance: 29,989; Umpires: HP: Linus Baker; 1B: Shawn Rakos; 2B: Grady Smith; 3B: Jake Uhlenhopp

June 16, 2024; 6:00 pm CDT (UTC-5); Game 6	No. 4 North Carolina	**1–6**	**No. 1 Tennessee**	Charles Schwab Field Omaha; Attendance: 25,140; Umpires: HP:Kellen Levy; 1B: David Uhl; 2B: Scott Cline; 3B: Mike Morris
June 16, 2024; 6:00 pm CDT (UTC-5); Game 6	LP: Shea Sprague (3–2)	Box Score	WP: Drew Beam (9–2)	Charles Schwab Field Omaha; Attendance: 25,140; Umpires: HP:Kellen Levy; 1B: David Uhl; 2B: Scott Cline; 3B: Mike Morris
June 16, 2024; 6:00 pm CDT (UTC-5); Game 6	HR: Honeycutt (27)	Box Score	HR: Tears (20), Chapman (7)	Charles Schwab Field Omaha; Attendance: 25,140; Umpires: HP:Kellen Levy; 1B: David Uhl; 2B: Scott Cline; 3B: Mike Morris

June 18, 2024; 1:00 pm CDT (UTC-5); Game 9	**No. 8 Florida State**	**9–5**	No. 4 North Carolina	Charles Schwab Field Omaha; Attendance: 23,047; Umpires: HP: Mike Morris; 1B: Linus Baker; 2B: Scott Cline; 3B: David Uyl
June 18, 2024; 1:00 pm CDT (UTC-5); Game 9	WP: Andrew Armstrong (6–0); Sv: Connor Hults (5)	Box Score	LP: Aidan Haugh (4–3)	Charles Schwab Field Omaha; Attendance: 23,047; Umpires: HP: Mike Morris; 1B: Linus Baker; 2B: Scott Cline; 3B: David Uyl
June 18, 2024; 1:00 pm CDT (UTC-5); Game 9	HR: Williams (14), West (3)	Box Score	HR: Honeycutt (28)	Charles Schwab Field Omaha; Attendance: 23,047; Umpires: HP: Mike Morris; 1B: Linus Baker; 2B: Scott Cline; 3B: David Uyl

June 19, 2024; 2:45 pm CDT (UTC-5); Game 11	**No. 1 Tennessee**	**7–2**	No. 8 Florida State	Charles Schwab Field Omaha; Attendance: 24,696; Umpires: HP: Jake Uhlenhopp; 1B: David Uyl; 2B: Scott Cline; 3B: Shawn Rakos
June 19, 2024; 2:45 pm CDT (UTC-5); Game 11	WP: Zander Sechrist (5–1)	Box Score	LP: John Abraham (5–2)	Charles Schwab Field Omaha; Attendance: 24,696; Umpires: HP: Jake Uhlenhopp; 1B: David Uyl; 2B: Scott Cline; 3B: Shawn Rakos
June 19, 2024; 2:45 pm CDT (UTC-5); Game 11	HR: Burke (20)	Box Score	HR: Cantu (9), Lodise (9)	Charles Schwab Field Omaha; Attendance: 24,696; Umpires: HP: Jake Uhlenhopp; 1B: David Uyl; 2B: Scott Cline; 3B: Shawn Rakos

==== Bracket 2 ====
June 15, 2024; 1:00 pm CDT (UTC-5); Game 3	**No. 2 Kentucky**	**5–4 (F/10)**	No. 10 NC State	Charles Schwab Field Omaha; Attendance: 24,488; Umpires: HP: Mike Morris; 1B:Kellen Levy; 2B: David Uyl; 3B: Scott Cline
June 15, 2024; 1:00 pm CDT (UTC-5); Game 3	WP: Johnny Hummel (4–0)	Box Score	LP: Derrick Smith (3–2)	Charles Schwab Field Omaha; Attendance: 24,488; Umpires: HP: Mike Morris; 1B:Kellen Levy; 2B: David Uyl; 3B: Scott Cline
June 15, 2024; 1:00 pm CDT (UTC-5); Game 3	HR: McCarthy (8)	Box Score	HR: Makarewicz (23)	Charles Schwab Field Omaha; Attendance: 24,488; Umpires: HP: Mike Morris; 1B:Kellen Levy; 2B: David Uyl; 3B: Scott Cline

June 15, 2024; 10:15 pm CDT (UTC-5); Game 4	**No. 3 Texas A&M**	**3–2**	Florida	Charles Schwab Field Omaha; Attendance: 25,774; Umpires: HP: Jake Uhlenhopp; 1B: Linus Baker; 2B: Shawn Rakos; 3B: Grady Smith
June 15, 2024; 10:15 pm CDT (UTC-5); Game 4	WP: Chris Cortez (10–3); Sv: Evan Aschenbeck (10)	Box Score	LP: Liam Peterson (3–5)	Charles Schwab Field Omaha; Attendance: 25,774; Umpires: HP: Jake Uhlenhopp; 1B: Linus Baker; 2B: Shawn Rakos; 3B: Grady Smith
June 15, 2024; 10:15 pm CDT (UTC-5); Game 4	HR: none	Box Score	HR: none	Charles Schwab Field Omaha; Attendance: 25,774; Umpires: HP: Jake Uhlenhopp; 1B: Linus Baker; 2B: Shawn Rakos; 3B: Grady Smith

June 17, 2024; 1:00 pm CDT (UTC-5); Game 7	No. 10 NC State	**4–5**	**Florida**	Charles Schwab Field Omaha; Attendance: 23,578; Umpires: HP: Shawn Rakos; 1B: Grady Smith; 2B: Jake Uhlenhopp; 3B: Linus Baker
June 17, 2024; 1:00 pm CDT (UTC-5); Game 7	LP: Fritton (3–7)	Box Score	WP: Cade Fisher (4–3); Sv: Brandon Neely (5)	Charles Schwab Field Omaha; Attendance: 23,578; Umpires: HP: Shawn Rakos; 1B: Grady Smith; 2B: Jake Uhlenhopp; 3B: Linus Baker
June 17, 2024; 1:00 pm CDT (UTC-5); Game 7	HR: Makarewicz (24)	Box Score	HR: Caglianone (34), Shelnut (16)	Charles Schwab Field Omaha; Attendance: 23,578; Umpires: HP: Shawn Rakos; 1B: Grady Smith; 2B: Jake Uhlenhopp; 3B: Linus Baker

June 17, 2024; 6:00 pm CDT (UTC-5); Game 8	No. 2 Kentucky	**1–5**	**No. 3 Texas A&M**	Charles Schwab Field Omaha; Attendance: 25,327; Umpires: HP: David Uyl; 1B: Scott Cline; 2B: Mike Morris; 3B: Adam Dowdy
June 17, 2024; 6:00 pm CDT (UTC-5); Game 8	LP: Mason Moore (9–4)	Box Score	WP: Ryan Prager (8–2); Sv: Josh Stewart (1)	Charles Schwab Field Omaha; Attendance: 25,327; Umpires: HP: David Uyl; 1B: Scott Cline; 2B: Mike Morris; 3B: Adam Dowdy
June 17, 2024; 6:00 pm CDT (UTC-5); Game 8	HR: Nicholson (23)	Box Score	HR: none	Charles Schwab Field Omaha; Attendance: 25,327; Umpires: HP: David Uyl; 1B: Scott Cline; 2B: Mike Morris; 3B: Adam Dowdy

June 19, 2024; 10:00 am CDT (UTC-5); Game 10	**Florida**	**15–4**	No. 2 Kentucky	Charles Schwab Field Omaha; Attendance: 23,687; Umpires: HP: Grady Smith; 1B: Adam Dowdy; 2B: Shawn Rakos; 3B: Scott Cline
June 19, 2024; 10:00 am CDT (UTC-5); Game 10	WP: Pierce Coppola (1–4)	Box Score	LP: Dominic Niman (8–5)	Charles Schwab Field Omaha; Attendance: 23,687; Umpires: HP: Grady Smith; 1B: Adam Dowdy; 2B: Shawn Rakos; 3B: Scott Cline
June 19, 2024; 10:00 am CDT (UTC-5); Game 10	HR: Caglianone (35), Donay 2 (14)	Box Score	HR: Pitre (10)	Charles Schwab Field Omaha; Attendance: 23,687; Umpires: HP: Grady Smith; 1B: Adam Dowdy; 2B: Shawn Rakos; 3B: Scott Cline

June 19, 2024; 6:55 pm CDT (UTC-5); Game 12	**No. 3 Texas A&M**	**6–0**	Florida	Charles Schwab Field Omaha; Attendance: 25,429; Umpires: HP: Adam Dowdy; 1B: Mike Morris; 2B: Grady Smith; 3B: Linus Baker
June 19, 2024; 6:55 pm CDT (UTC-5); Game 12	WP: Justin Lamkin (3–2)	Box Score	LP: Liam Peterson (3–6)	Charles Schwab Field Omaha; Attendance: 25,429; Umpires: HP: Adam Dowdy; 1B: Mike Morris; 2B: Grady Smith; 3B: Linus Baker
June 19, 2024; 6:55 pm CDT (UTC-5); Game 12	HR: Sorrell (11)	Box Score		Charles Schwab Field Omaha; Attendance: 25,429; Umpires: HP: Adam Dowdy; 1B: Mike Morris; 2B: Grady Smith; 3B: Linus Baker

==== Finals ====
===== Game 1 =====
June 22, 2024 6:30 p.m. (CDT) at Charles Schwab Field Omaha in Omaha, Nebraska
Team	1	2	3	4	5	6	7	8	9	R	H	E
**No. 3 Texas A&M**	2	0	5	0	0	0	2	0	0	**9**	**13**	**0**
No. 1 Tennessee	0	1	1	0	0	0	3	0	0	**5**	**12**	**3**
WP: Josh Stewart (2−2) LP: Chris Stamos (3−1); Home runs: TAMU: Grahovac (23), Kent (4); TENN: Dreiling (21), Ensley (12); Attendance: 26,498; Notes: HP: Mike Morris; 1B: Linus Baker; 2B: Grady Smith; 3B: Jake Uhlenhopp; Boxscore

===== Game 2 =====
June 23, 2024 1:00 p.m. (CDT) at Charles Schwab Field Omaha in Omaha, Nebraska
Team	1	2	3	4	5	6	7	8	9	R	H	E
**No. 1 Tennessee**	0	0	0	0	0	0	2	2	0	**4**	**7**	**0**
No. 3 Texas A&M	1	0	0	0	0	0	0	0	0	**1**	**7**	**1**
WP: Aaron Combs (3–1) LP: Kaiden Wilson (0–2) Sv: Nate Snead (6); Home runs: TENN: Dreiling (22), Stark (11); TAMU: LaViolette (29); Attendance: 25,987; Notes: HP: Scott Cline; 1B: Shawn Rakos; 2B: Jake Uhlenhopp; 3B: Mike Morris; Boxscore

===== Game 3 =====
June 24, 2024 6:00 p.m. (CDT) at Charles Schwab Field Omaha in Omaha, Nebraska
Team	1	2	3	4	5	6	7	8	9	R	H	E
No. 3 Texas A&M	0	0	1	0	0	0	0	2	2	**5**	**13**	**0**
**No. 1 Tennessee**	1	0	2	0	0	0	3	0	0	**6**	**13**	**1**
WP: Zander Sechrist (6–1) LP: Justin Lamkin (3–3) Sv: Aaron Combs (6); Home runs: TAMU: None; TENN: Moore (34), Dreiling (23); Attendance: 24,685; Notes: HP: Grady Smith; 1B: Jake Uhlenhopp; 2B: Scott Cline; 3B: David Uyl; Boxscore

== All-Tournament Team ==
The following players were members of the Men's College World Series All-Tournament Team.

Position	Player	School
P	Evan Aschenbeck	Texas A&M
P	Zander Sechrist	Tennessee
C	Jaxson West	Florida State
1B	Jac Caglianone	Florida
2B	Christian Moore	Tennessee
3B	Alec Makarewicz	NC State
SS	Dean Curley	Tennessee
OF	Dylan Dreiling (MOP)	Tennessee
OF	Jaime Ferrer	Florida State
OF	Vance Honeycutt	North Carolina
DH	Kaeden Kent	Texas A&M

== Final standings ==
Seeds listed below indicate national seeds only

Place	School	Record
1st	No. 1 Tennessee	10–2
2nd	No. 3 Texas A&M	9–2
3rd	Florida	8–3
3rd	No. 8 Florida State	7–2
5th	No. 2 Kentucky	6–2
5th	No. 4 North Carolina	6–3
7th	No. 10 NC State	5–3
7th	No. 12 Virginia	5–2
9th	No. 6 Clemson	3–2
9th	UConn	3–3
9th	Evansville	4–3
9th	No. 7 Georgia	4–2
9th	Kansas State	3–2
9th	Oregon	3–2
9th	No. 15 Oregon State	3–2
9th	West Virginia	3–2
17th	Coastal Carolina	2–2
17th	No. 16 East Carolina	3–2
17th	Georgia Tech	2–2
17th	Grand Canyon	2–2
17th	Indiana State	2–2
17th	UC Irvine	2–2
17th	James Madison	2–2
17th	Louisiana	2–2
17th	LSU	3–2
17th	Mississippi State	2–2
17th	No. 9 Oklahoma	3–2
17th	No. 11 Oklahoma State	2–2
17th	No. 14 UC Santa Barbara	2–2
17th	Southern Miss	2–2
17th	Southeast Missouri State	2–2
17th	UCF	2–2
33rd	No. 5 Arkansas	1–2
33rd	Dallas Baptist	1–2
33rd	Duke	1–2
33rd	High Point	1–2
33rd	Illinois	1–2
33rd	Indiana	1–2
33rd	Nebraska	1–2
33rd	UNC Wilmington	1–2
33rd	San Diego	1–2
33rd	South Carolina	1–2
33rd	St. John’s	1–2
33rd	Stetson	1–2
33rd	Texas	1–2
33rd	Tulane	1–2
33rd	VCU	1–2
33rd	Wofford	1–2
49th	Alabama	0–2
49th	No. 13 Arizona	0–2
49th	Army	0–2
49th	Bryant	0–2
49th	Fresno State	0–2
49th	Grambling	0–2
49th	LIU	0–2
49th	Louisiana Tech	0–2
49th	Niagara	0–2
49th	Nicholls	0–2
49th	Northern Kentucky	0–2
49th	Oral Roberts	0–2
49th	Penn	0–2
49th	Vanderbilt	0–2
49th	Wake Forest	0–2
49th	Western Michigan	0–2

== Record by conference ==
Conference	# of Bids	Record	Win %	Nc Record	Nc Win %	RF	SR	WS	NS	CS	NC
SEC	11	44–23	.657	37–16	.698	7	5	4	3	2	1
ACC	8	29–18	.617	26–15	.634	6	5	4	1	–	–
Big 12	6	14–12	.538	14–12	.538	5	2	–	–	–	–
Pac-12	3	6–6	.500	6–6	.500	2	2	–	–	–	–
Missouri Valley	2	6–5	.545	6–5	.545	2	1	–	–	–	–
Big East	2	4–5	.444	4–5	.444	1	1	–	–	–	–
Sun Belt	4	8–8	.500	8–8	.500	4	–	–	–	–	–
Big West	2	4–4	.500	4–4	.500	2	–	–	–	–	–
American	2	4–4	.500	4–4	.500	1	–	–	–	–	–
Ohio Valley	1	2–2	.500	2–2	.500	1	–	–	–	–	–
WAC	1	2–2	.500	2–2	.500	1	–	–	–	–	–
Big Ten	3	3–6	.333	3–6	.333	–	–	–	–	–	–
CUSA	2	1–4	.200	1–4	.200	–	–	–	–	–	–
ASUN	1	1–2	.333	1–2	.333	–	–	–	–	–	–
Atlantic 10	1	1–2	.333	1–2	.333	–	–	–	–	–	–
Big South	1	1–2	.333	1–2	.333	–	–	–	–	–	–
CAA	1	1–2	.333	1–2	.333	–	–	–	–	–	–
SoCon	1	1–2	.333	1–2	.333	–	–	–	–	–	–
West Coast	1	1–2	.333	1–2	.333	–	–	–	–	–	–
America East	1	0–2	.000	0–2	.000	–	–	–	–	–	–
Horizon	1	0–2	.000	0–2	.000	–	–	–	–	–	–
Ivy League	1	0–2	.000	0–2	.000	–	–	–	–	–	–
MAAC	1	0–2	.000	0–2	.000	–	–	–	–	–	–
MAC	1	0–2	.000	0–2	.000	–	–	–	–	–	–
Mountain West	1	0–2	.000	0–2	.000	–	–	–	–	–	–
Northeast	1	0–2	.000	0–2	.000	–	–	–	–	–	–
Patriot	1	0–2	.000	0–2	.000	–	–	–	–	–	–
Southland	1	0–2	.000	0–2	.000	–	–	–	–	–	–
SWAC	1	0–2	.000	0–2	.000	–	–	–	–	–	–
Summit	1	0–2	.000	0–2	.000	–	–	–	–	–	–

== Media coverage ==
=== Radio ===
NRG Media will provide nationwide radio coverage of the Men's College World Series through its Omaha Station KOZN, in association with Westwood One. It also will stream all MCWS games at westwoodonesports.com, Tunein, the Varsity Network, and on SiriusXM.

=== Television ===
ESPN networks aired every game from the Regionals, Super Regionals, and the Men's College World Series. For the first time, ABC aired Game 2 of the Men's College World Series finals.

==== Broadcast assignments ====
Regionals

- Clay Matvick and Ben McDonald: Knoxville, Tennessee
- Eric Frede and Danan Hughes: Lexington, Kentucky
- Roy Philpott and Xavier Scruggs: College Station, Texas
- Mike Monaco and Gaby Sánchez: Chapel Hill, North Carolina
- Derek Jones and Jay Walker: Fayetteville, Arkansas
- Dave Neal and Devon Travis: Clemson, South Carolina
- Kevin Fitzgerald and Bobby Moranda: Athens, Georgia
- Sam Ravech and Gregg Olson: Tallahassee, Florida
- Victor Rojas and Keith Moreland: Norman, Oklahoma
- Dani Wexelman and Roddy Jones: Raleigh, North Carolina
- Tom Hart and Kyle Peterson: Stillwater, Oklahoma
- Richard Cross and Todd Walker: Charlottesville, Virginia
- Mike Ferrin and Jensen Lewis: Tucson, Arizona
- Mark Neely and Greg Swindell: Santa Barbara, California
- Roxy Bernstein and Wes Clements: Corvallis, Oregon
- Anish Shroff and Lance Cormier: Greenville, North Carolina

Super Regionals

- Clay Matvick and Gregg Olson: Knoxville, Tennessee
- Roxy Bernstein and Xavier Scruggs: Lexington, Kentucky
- Victor Rojas and Lance Cormier: College Station, Texas
- Mike Monaco and Kyle Peterson: Chapel Hill, North Carolina
- Dave Neal and Chris Burke: Clemson, South Carolina
- Tom Hart and Ben McDonald: Athens, Georgia
- Mike Ferrin and Gaby Sánchez: Tallahassee, Florida
- Roy Philpott and Devon Travis: Charlottesville, Virginia

Men's College World Series

- Karl Ravech, Eduardo Pérez, Ben McDonald, and Dani Wexelman: June 14 & 15 afternoons
- Mike Monaco, Kyle Peterson, Chris Burke, and Kris Budden: June 14–16 evenings
- Mike Monaco, Ben McDonald, and Dani Wexelman: June 16 afternoon
- Mike Monaco, Ben McDonald, Chris Burke, and Dani Wexelman: June 17–19 afternoons
- Karl Ravech, Eduardo Pérez, Kyle Peterson, and Kris Budden: June 17 & 19 evenings, June 19 morning

MCWS Championship Series

- Karl Ravech, Kyle Peterson, Chris Burke, and Kris Budden

== Notes ==
Six-of-the-last nine College World Series champions, including this year...lost their first game in the final best-of-three series.

Tennessee was the first #1 seed in the 64-team tournament to win the championship...in a quarter-century. (U. of Miami did it in 1999, the first year seeding began.)

Texas A&M was only the third team, since the tournament championship series became a best-of-three in 2003, (along with UNC in 2006, and Vanderbilt in 2015), to win their first nine games in the 64-team tournament...then lose their next two, and finish as runner-up.

== See also ==
- 2024 NCAA Division I softball tournament
- 2024 NCAA Division II baseball tournament
- 2024 NCAA Division III baseball tournament
