= 2024 Men's College World Series =

Final stage of the 2024 NCAA Division I baseball tournament

2024 College World Series
Team (Wins)	Managers	Season
Tennessee (2)	Tony Vitello	60–13 (.822)
Texas A&M (1)	Jim Schlossnagle	53–15 (.779)
- Dates: June 14–24
- Venue: Charles Schwab Field Omaha
- MOP: Dylan Dreiling, Tennessee
- Umpires: Scott Cline; Mike Morris; Kellen Levy; David Uyl; Grady Smith; Jake Uhlenhopp; Linus Baker; Shawn Rakos

Broadcast
- Television: ABC; ESPN; ESPN2; ESPN+ (United States – English)
- TV announcers: Karl Ravech (play-by-play); Mike Monaco (play-by-play); Eduardo Pérez (analyst); Ben McDonald (analyst); Kyle Peterson (analyst); Chris Burke (analyst); Dani Wexelman (reporter); Kris Budden (reporter)
- Radio: NRG Media & Westwood One
- Radio announcers: John Bishop (play-by-play); Gary Sharp (analyst); Connor Happer (reporter)

The 2024 NCAA Men's College World Series (Note: While the event's official name has been "NCAA Men's College World Series" since no later than 2008, the 2022 edition was the first in which the NCAA consistently included the word "Men's" in the event branding.) was the final stage of the 2024 NCAA Division I baseball tournament. It was scheduled from June 14 through 24 at Charles Schwab Field Omaha in Omaha, Nebraska. This marked the 77th edition of the College World Series and 74th time the event was held in Omaha.

The tournament featured eight teams in two double elimination brackets with the two winners meeting in a best-of-three championship series. With the advancement of Texas A&M and Tennessee to the championship series, a school was assured of winning its first ever College World Series championship, making this the first time a College World Series between two teams with no baseball championships since 2014; of the two, only Tennessee appeared in the championship final, doing so in 1951. The championship final saw Tennessee win its first national championship in program history after losing the first game to Texas A&M and then winning the second and third games.

== Background ==
The top four national seeds qualified for the 2024 College World Series, with Arkansas being the highest ranked national seed to be eliminated, losing in their Fayetteville regional. Of the 8 teams in Omaha, 4 come from the SEC (three from the conference's East Division, one from the West Division), and 4 from the ACC (two from its Coastal Division, two from the Atlantic Division). It is the first time since the tournament expanded to eight teams in 1950 that only two conferences were represented in the College World Series. The 2024 MCWS became the first time ever that the first two games were capped with a walk-off hit after Tennessee hit a walk off single to defeat Florida State in Game 2. The following day, history continued as Kentucky hit a walk off homerun to become the third walk off hit in as many games.

== Participants ==
School	Conference	Record (Conf)	Head Coach	Super Regional	Previous MCWS Appearances	Previous MCWS Best Finish	Previous MCWS W–L Record
Florida State	ACC	47–15 (17–12)	Link Jarrett	Tallahassee	23 (last: 2019)	2nd (1970, 1986, 1999)	30–46
North Carolina	ACC	47–14 (22–8)	Scott Forbes	Chapel Hill	11 (last: 2018)	2nd (2006, 2007)	18–23
Virginia	ACC	46–15 (18–12)	Brian O'Connor	Charlottesville	6 (last: 2023)	1st (2015)	13–12
NC State	ACC	38–21 (18–11)	Elliott Avent	Athens	3 (last: 2021)	3rd (1968, 2021)	5–5
Tennessee	SEC	55–12 (22–8)	Tony Vitello	Knoxville	6 (last: 2023)	2nd (1951)	9–12
Kentucky	SEC	45–14 (22–8)	Nick Mingione	Lexington	First appearance		0–0
Florida	SEC	34–28 (13–17)	Kevin O'Sullivan	Clemson	13 (last: 2023)	1st (2017)	25–25
Texas A&M	SEC	49–13 (19–11)	Jim Schlossnagle	College Station	7 (last: 2022)	3rd (2022)	4–14

== Bracket ==
Sources: Seeds listed below indicate national seeds only.

First round	Second round
4	North Carolina	3
12	Virginia	2
4	North Carolina	1
1	Tennessee	6
1	Tennessee	12
8	Florida State	11
Bracket 1
12	Virginia	3
8	Florida State	7
8	Florida State	9
4	North Carolina	5
2	Kentucky	5^{10}
10	NC State	4
2	Kentucky	1
3	Texas A&M	5
3	Texas A&M	3
Florida	2
Bracket 2
10	NC State	4
Florida	5
Florida	15
2	Kentucky	4

Semifinals
1	Tennessee	7	−
8	Florida State	2	−
3	Texas A&M	6	−
Florida	0	−

Finals
1	Tennessee	5	4	6
3	Texas A&M	9	1	5

== Game results ==
=== Bracket 1 ===
June 14, 2024; 1:00 pm CDT (UTC-5); Game 1	No. 4 North Carolina	3–2	No. 12 Virginia	Charles Schwab Field Omaha; Attendance: 23,990; Umpires: HP:Scott Cline; 1B: Mike Morris; 2B: Kellen Levy; 3B: David Uyl
June 14, 2024; 1:00 pm CDT (UTC-5); Game 1	WP: Dalton Pence (5–1)	Box Score	LP: Chase Hungate (7–2)	Charles Schwab Field Omaha; Attendance: 23,990; Umpires: HP:Scott Cline; 1B: Mike Morris; 2B: Kellen Levy; 3B: David Uyl

June 14, 2024; 6:00 pm CDT (UTC-5); Game 2	No. 1 Tennessee	12–11	No. 8 Florida State	Charles Schwab Field Omaha; Attendance: 25,499; Umpires: HP: Grady Smith; 1B: Jake Uhlenhopp; 2B: Linus Baker; 3B: Shawn Rakos
June 14, 2024; 6:00 pm CDT (UTC-5); Game 2	WP: Nate Snead (10–2)	Box Score	LP: Brennen Oxford (2–1)	Charles Schwab Field Omaha; Attendance: 25,499; Umpires: HP: Grady Smith; 1B: Jake Uhlenhopp; 2B: Linus Baker; 3B: Shawn Rakos
June 14, 2024; 6:00 pm CDT (UTC-5); Game 2	HR: Moore (33), Tears (19)	Box Score	HR: Ferrer (20)	Charles Schwab Field Omaha; Attendance: 25,499; Umpires: HP: Grady Smith; 1B: Jake Uhlenhopp; 2B: Linus Baker; 3B: Shawn Rakos

June 16, 2024; 1:00 pm CDT (UTC-5); Game 5	No. 12 Virginia	3–7	No. 8 Florida State	Charles Schwab Field Omaha; Attendance: 29,989; Umpires: HP: Linus Baker; 1B: Shawn Rakos; 2B: Grady Smith; 3B: Jake Uhlenhopp
June 16, 2024; 1:00 pm CDT (UTC-5); Game 5	LP: Jay Woolfolk (4–2)	Box Score	WP: Carson Dorsey (8–4)	Charles Schwab Field Omaha; Attendance: 29,989; Umpires: HP: Linus Baker; 1B: Shawn Rakos; 2B: Grady Smith; 3B: Jake Uhlenhopp
June 16, 2024; 1:00 pm CDT (UTC-5); Game 5		Box Score	HR: Ferrer (21), Ferrer (22), Lodise (8)	Charles Schwab Field Omaha; Attendance: 29,989; Umpires: HP: Linus Baker; 1B: Shawn Rakos; 2B: Grady Smith; 3B: Jake Uhlenhopp

June 16, 2024; 6:00 pm CDT (UTC-5); Game 6	No. 4 North Carolina	1–6	No. 1 Tennessee	Charles Schwab Field Omaha; Attendance: 25,140; Umpires: HP:Kellen Levy; 1B: David Uhl; 2B: Scott Cline; 3B: Mike Morris
June 16, 2024; 6:00 pm CDT (UTC-5); Game 6	LP: Shea Sprague (3–2)	Box Score	WP: Drew Beam (9–2)	Charles Schwab Field Omaha; Attendance: 25,140; Umpires: HP:Kellen Levy; 1B: David Uhl; 2B: Scott Cline; 3B: Mike Morris
June 16, 2024; 6:00 pm CDT (UTC-5); Game 6	HR: Honeycutt (27)	Box Score	HR: Tears (20), Chapman (7)	Charles Schwab Field Omaha; Attendance: 25,140; Umpires: HP:Kellen Levy; 1B: David Uhl; 2B: Scott Cline; 3B: Mike Morris

June 18, 2024; 1:00 pm CDT (UTC-5); Game 9	No. 8 Florida State	9–5	No. 4 North Carolina	Charles Schwab Field Omaha; Attendance: 23,047; Umpires: HP: Mike Morris; 1B: Linus Baker; 2B: Scott Cline; 3B: David Uyl
June 18, 2024; 1:00 pm CDT (UTC-5); Game 9	WP: Andrew Armstrong (6–0); Sv: Connor Hults (5)	Box Score	LP: Aidan Haugh (4–3)	Charles Schwab Field Omaha; Attendance: 23,047; Umpires: HP: Mike Morris; 1B: Linus Baker; 2B: Scott Cline; 3B: David Uyl
June 18, 2024; 1:00 pm CDT (UTC-5); Game 9	HR: Williams (14), West (3)	Box Score	HR: Honeycutt (28)	Charles Schwab Field Omaha; Attendance: 23,047; Umpires: HP: Mike Morris; 1B: Linus Baker; 2B: Scott Cline; 3B: David Uyl

June 19, 2024; 2:45 pm CDT (UTC-5); Game 11	No. 1 Tennessee	7–2	No. 8 Florida State	Charles Schwab Field Omaha; Attendance: 24,696; Umpires: HP: Jake Uhlenhopp; 1B: David Uyl; 2B: Scott Cline; 3B: Shawn Rakos
June 19, 2024; 2:45 pm CDT (UTC-5); Game 11	WP: Zander Sechrist (5–1)	Box Score	LP: John Abraham (5–2)	Charles Schwab Field Omaha; Attendance: 24,696; Umpires: HP: Jake Uhlenhopp; 1B: David Uyl; 2B: Scott Cline; 3B: Shawn Rakos
June 19, 2024; 2:45 pm CDT (UTC-5); Game 11	HR: Burke (20)	Box Score	HR: Cantu (9), Lodise (9)	Charles Schwab Field Omaha; Attendance: 24,696; Umpires: HP: Jake Uhlenhopp; 1B: David Uyl; 2B: Scott Cline; 3B: Shawn Rakos

=== Bracket 2 ===
June 15, 2024; 1:00 pm CDT (UTC-5); Game 3	No. 2 Kentucky	5–4 (F/10)	No. 10 NC State	Charles Schwab Field Omaha; Attendance: 24,488; Umpires: HP: Mike Morris; 1B:Kellen Levy; 2B: David Uyl; 3B: Scott Cline
June 15, 2024; 1:00 pm CDT (UTC-5); Game 3	WP: Johnny Hummel (4–0)	Box Score	LP: Derrick Smith (3–2)	Charles Schwab Field Omaha; Attendance: 24,488; Umpires: HP: Mike Morris; 1B:Kellen Levy; 2B: David Uyl; 3B: Scott Cline
June 15, 2024; 1:00 pm CDT (UTC-5); Game 3	HR: McCarthy (8)	Box Score	HR: Makarewicz (23)	Charles Schwab Field Omaha; Attendance: 24,488; Umpires: HP: Mike Morris; 1B:Kellen Levy; 2B: David Uyl; 3B: Scott Cline

June 15, 2024; 10:15 pm CDT (UTC-5); Game 4	No. 3 Texas A&M	3–2	Florida	Charles Schwab Field Omaha; Attendance: 25,774; Umpires: HP: Jake Uhlenhopp; 1B: Linus Baker; 2B: Shawn Rakos; 3B: Grady Smith
June 15, 2024; 10:15 pm CDT (UTC-5); Game 4	WP: Chris Cortez (10–3); Sv: Evan Aschenbeck (10)	Box Score	LP: Liam Peterson (3–5)	Charles Schwab Field Omaha; Attendance: 25,774; Umpires: HP: Jake Uhlenhopp; 1B: Linus Baker; 2B: Shawn Rakos; 3B: Grady Smith
June 15, 2024; 10:15 pm CDT (UTC-5); Game 4	HR: none	Box Score	HR: none	Charles Schwab Field Omaha; Attendance: 25,774; Umpires: HP: Jake Uhlenhopp; 1B: Linus Baker; 2B: Shawn Rakos; 3B: Grady Smith

June 17, 2024; 1:00 pm CDT (UTC-5); Game 7	No. 10 NC State	4–5	Florida	Charles Schwab Field Omaha; Attendance: 23,578; Umpires: HP: Shawn Rakos; 1B: Grady Smith; 2B: Jake Uhlenhopp; 3B: Linus Baker
June 17, 2024; 1:00 pm CDT (UTC-5); Game 7	LP: Fritton (3–7)	Box Score	WP: Cade Fisher (4–3); Sv: Brandon Neely (5)	Charles Schwab Field Omaha; Attendance: 23,578; Umpires: HP: Shawn Rakos; 1B: Grady Smith; 2B: Jake Uhlenhopp; 3B: Linus Baker
June 17, 2024; 1:00 pm CDT (UTC-5); Game 7	HR: Makarewicz (24)	Box Score	HR: Caglianone (34), Shelnut (16)	Charles Schwab Field Omaha; Attendance: 23,578; Umpires: HP: Shawn Rakos; 1B: Grady Smith; 2B: Jake Uhlenhopp; 3B: Linus Baker

June 17, 2024; 6:00 pm CDT (UTC-5); Game 8	No. 2 Kentucky	1–5	No. 3 Texas A&M	Charles Schwab Field Omaha; Attendance: 25,327; Umpires: HP: David Uyl; 1B: Scott Cline; 2B: Mike Morris; 3B: Adam Dowdy
June 17, 2024; 6:00 pm CDT (UTC-5); Game 8	LP: Mason Moore (9–4)	Box Score	WP: Ryan Prager (8–2); Sv: Josh Stewart (1)	Charles Schwab Field Omaha; Attendance: 25,327; Umpires: HP: David Uyl; 1B: Scott Cline; 2B: Mike Morris; 3B: Adam Dowdy
June 17, 2024; 6:00 pm CDT (UTC-5); Game 8	HR: Nicholson (23)	Box Score	HR: none	Charles Schwab Field Omaha; Attendance: 25,327; Umpires: HP: David Uyl; 1B: Scott Cline; 2B: Mike Morris; 3B: Adam Dowdy

June 19, 2024; 10:00 am CDT (UTC-5); Game 10	Florida	15–4	No. 2 Kentucky	Charles Schwab Field Omaha; Attendance: 23,687; Umpires: HP: Grady Smith; 1B: Adam Dowdy; 2B: Shawn Rakos; 3B: Scott Cline
June 19, 2024; 10:00 am CDT (UTC-5); Game 10	WP: Pierce Coppola (1–4)	Box Score	LP: Dominic Niman (8–5)	Charles Schwab Field Omaha; Attendance: 23,687; Umpires: HP: Grady Smith; 1B: Adam Dowdy; 2B: Shawn Rakos; 3B: Scott Cline
June 19, 2024; 10:00 am CDT (UTC-5); Game 10	HR: Caglianone (35), Donay 2 (14)	Box Score	HR: Pitre (10)	Charles Schwab Field Omaha; Attendance: 23,687; Umpires: HP: Grady Smith; 1B: Adam Dowdy; 2B: Shawn Rakos; 3B: Scott Cline

June 19, 2024; 6:55 pm CDT (UTC-5); Game 12	No. 3 Texas A&M	6–0	Florida	Charles Schwab Field Omaha; Attendance: 25,429; Umpires: HP: Adam Dowdy; 1B: Mike Morris; 2B: Grady Smith; 3B: Linus Baker
June 19, 2024; 6:55 pm CDT (UTC-5); Game 12	WP: Justin Lamkin (3–2)	Box Score	LP: Liam Peterson (3–6)	Charles Schwab Field Omaha; Attendance: 25,429; Umpires: HP: Adam Dowdy; 1B: Mike Morris; 2B: Grady Smith; 3B: Linus Baker
June 19, 2024; 6:55 pm CDT (UTC-5); Game 12	HR: Sorrell (11)	Box Score		Charles Schwab Field Omaha; Attendance: 25,429; Umpires: HP: Adam Dowdy; 1B: Mike Morris; 2B: Grady Smith; 3B: Linus Baker

=== Finals ===
==== Game 1 ====
June 22, 2024 6:30 p.m. (CDT) at Charles Schwab Field Omaha in Omaha, Nebraska
Team	1	2	3	4	5	6	7	8	9	R	H	E
No. 3 Texas A&M	2	0	5	0	0	0	2	0	0	9	13	0
No. 1 Tennessee	0	1	1	0	0	0	3	0	0	5	12	3
WP: Josh Stewart (2−2) LP: Chris Stamos (3−1); Home runs: TAMU: Grahovac (23), Kent (4); TENN: Dreiling (21), Ensley (12); Attendance: 26,498; Notes: HP: Mike Morris; 1B: Linus Baker; 2B: Grady Smith; 3B: Jake Uhlenhopp; Boxscore

==== Game 2 ====
June 23, 2024 1:00 p.m. (CDT) at Charles Schwab Field Omaha in Omaha, Nebraska
Team	1	2	3	4	5	6	7	8	9	R	H	E
No. 1 Tennessee	0	0	0	0	0	0	2	2	0	4	7	0
No. 3 Texas A&M	1	0	0	0	0	0	0	0	0	1	7	1
WP: Aaron Combs (3–1) LP: Kaiden Wilson (0–2) Sv: Nate Snead (6); Home runs: TENN: Dreiling (22), Stark (11); TAMU: LaViolette (29); Attendance: 25,987; Notes: HP: Scott Cline; 1B: Shawn Rakos; 2B: Jake Uhlenhopp; 3B: Mike Morris; Boxscore

==== Game 3 ====
June 24, 2024 6:00 p.m. (CDT) at Charles Schwab Field Omaha in Omaha, Nebraska
Team	1	2	3	4	5	6	7	8	9	R	H	E
No. 3 Texas A&M	0	0	1	0	0	0	0	2	2	5	13	0
No. 1 Tennessee	1	0	2	0	0	0	3	0	0	6	13	1
WP: Zander Sechrist (6–1) LP: Justin Lamkin (3–3) Sv: Aaron Combs (6); Home runs: TAMU: None; TENN: Moore (34), Dreiling (23); Attendance: 24,685; Notes: HP: Grady Smith; 1B: Jake Uhlenhopp; 2B: Scott Cline; 3B: David Uyl; Boxscore

== All-Tournament Team ==
The following players were members of the Men's College World Series All-Tournament Team.

Position	Player	School
P	Evan Aschenbeck	Texas A&M
P	Zander Sechrist	Tennessee
C	Jaxson West	Florida State
1B	Jac Caglianone	Florida
2B	Christian Moore	Tennessee
3B	Alec Makarewicz	NC State
SS	Dean Curley	Tennessee
OF	Dylan Dreiling (MOP)	Tennessee
OF	Jaime Ferrer	Florida State
OF	Vance Honeycutt	North Carolina
DH	Kaeden Kent	Texas A&M
