= 2024 Atlantic Coast Conference baseball tournament =

American college baseball tournament

- Teams: 12
- Format: See below
- Finals site: Truist Field; Charlotte, North Carolina
- Champions: Duke (2nd title)
- Winning coach: Chris Pollard (2nd title)
- MVP: Devin Obee (Duke)
- Attendance: 71,238
- Television: ACC Network (Tues-Sat); ESPN2 (Championship)

2024 Atlantic Coast Conference baseball standings
	Conf.				Overall
Team	W		L	PCT	W		L	PCT
Atlantic
No. 9 Clemson ^{x}‍‍‍^{y}	20	–	10	.667	44	–	16	.733
No. 6 NC State ‍‍‍^{y}	18	–	11	.621	38	–	23	.623
No. 4 Florida State ‍‍‍^{y}	17	–	12	.586	49	–	17	.742
Louisville ‍‍‍	16	–	14	.533	32	–	24	.571
No. 19 Wake Forest ‍‍‍^{y}	15	–	15	.500	38	–	22	.633
Notre Dame ‍‍‍	9	–	21	.300	27	–	25	.519
Boston College ‍‍‍	8	–	22	.267	22	–	31	.415
Coastal
No. 5 North Carolina ^{x}‍‍‍^{y}	22	–	8	.733	48	–	16	.750
No. 7 Virginia ‍‍‍^{y}	18	–	12	.600	46	–	17	.730
No. 24 Duke ‍‍‡‍^{y}	16	–	14	.533	40	–	20	.667
Georgia Tech ‍‍‍^{y}	15	–	15	.500	33	–	25	.569
Virginia Tech ‍‍‍	14	–	16	.467	32	–	22	.593
Miami (FL) ‍‍‍	11	–	19	.367	26	–	30	.464
Pittsburgh ‍‍‍	10	–	20	.333	26	–	28	.481
x – Division champion ‡ – Tournament champion y – Invited to the NCAA Tournament; As of June 26, 2024; Rankings from D1Baseball

The 2024 Atlantic Coast Conference baseball tournament was held May 21–26, 2024 at Truist Field in Charlotte, North Carolina. The annual tournament determines the official conference champion of the Division I Atlantic Coast Conference for college baseball.

The tournament has been held every year but two since 1973, with Clemson winning eleven championships prior this, the most all-time. Georgia Tech has won nine championships, and Florida State has won eight titles since its entry to the league in 1992, matching defending champion North Carolina's total. Recent entrants Virginia Tech, Boston College, Pittsburgh, Notre Dame and Louisville have never won the event.

The Clemson Tigers were the defending tournament champions but were unable to defend their crown, as they did not advance out of their group after finishing 1–1. Sixth seed Duke won their second ACC Tournament title after going 2–0 in their group, defeating Miami in the Semifinals, and topping fifth-seed Florida State in the Final 16–4.

== Format and seeding ==
The winner of each seven team division and the top ten other teams based on conference winning percentage, regardless of division, from the conference's regular season will be seeded one through twelve. Seeds one and two are awarded to the two division winners. Teams are then divided into four pools of three teams each, with the winners advancing to single elimination bracket for the championship.

If a 1–1 tie were to occur among all three teams in a pool, the highest seeded team would have advanced to the semifinals. Because of this, seeds 5–12 must win both pool play games to advance to the single-elimination bracket, and seeds 1–4 must only win the game against the winner of the game between the other two teams in the pool to advance. For example, if the 12 seed beats the 8 seed in the first game, then the winner of the 12 seed versus 1 seed advances, and the 8 seed versus 1 seed game has no effect on which team advances.

Team	W–L	Pct	GB #1	Seed
Atlantic Division
Clemson	20–10	.667	2	2
NC State	18–11	.621	3.5	3
Florida State	17–12	.586	4.5	5
Louisville	16–14	.533	6	7
Wake Forest	15–15	.500	7	8
Notre Dame	9–21	.300	13	—
Boston College	8–22	.267	14	—

Team	W–L	Pct	GB #1	Seed
Coastal Division
North Carolina	22–8	.733	–	1
Virginia	18–12	.600	4	4
Duke	16–14	.533	6	6
Georgia Tech	15–15	.500	7	9
Virginia Tech	14–16	.467	8	10
Miami (FL)	11–19	.367	11	11
Pittsburgh	10–20	.333	12	12

Tiebreakers
Teams	Record	Tiebreaker 1
(6) Duke (7) Louisville	16–14; 16–14	UNC 1–2; UNC 0–3
(8) Wake (9) Georgia Tech	15–15; 15–15	CLEM 3–0; CLEM 1–2

- Two-way tie broken by combined head-to-head records.
- Three-way tie broken by combined head-to-head records.
- If a tie remains after the first tiebreaker, the two-way tiebreaker is used.

== Schedule and results ==
=== Schedule ===
Game	Time*	Matchup^{#}	Score	Television	Attendance	Reference
Tuesday, May 21
1	11:00 a.m.	No. 11 Miami (FL) vs. No. 7 Louisville	8−5	ACCN	2,695	
2	3:00 p.m.	No. 9 Georgia Tech vs. No. 5 Florida State	9−12	ACCN	2,997	
3	7:00 p.m.	No. 10 Virginia Tech vs. No. 6 Duke	8–11	ACCN	3,842	
Wednesday, May 22
4	11:00 a.m.	No. 4 Virginia vs. No. 9 Georgia Tech	13–0 (7)	ACCN	2,919	
5	3:00 p.m.	No. 12 Pittsburgh vs. No. 8 Wake Forest	1−8	ACCN	3,494	
6	7:00 p.m.	No. 3 NC State vs. No. 10 Virginia Tech	19–9	ACCN	4,651	
Thursday, May 23
7	11:00 a.m.	No. 2 Clemson vs. No. 11 Miami	7–8	ACCN	3,907	
8	3:00 p.m.	No. 1 North Carolina vs. No. 12 Pittsburgh	12–2	ACCN	4,263	
9	7:00 p.m.	No. 6 Duke vs. No. 3 NC State	8–1	ACCN	5,696	
Friday, May 24
10	11:00 a.m.	No. 5 Florida State vs. No. 4 Virginia	12–7	ACCN	4,305	
11	3:00 p.m.	No. 7 Louisville vs. No. 2 Clemson	7–8	ACCN	4,782	
12	7:00 p.m.	No. 8 Wake Forest vs. No. 1 North Carolina	9–5 (12)	ACCN	9,296	
Saturday, May 25
Semifinal 1	1:00 p.m.	No. 5 Florida State vs. No 8. Wake Forest	9–6	ACCN	5,642	
Semifinal 2	5:00 p.m.	No. 11 Miami vs. No. 6 Duke	2–8	ACCN	5,879	
Championship – Sunday, May 26
Championship	12:00 p.m.	No. 5 Florida State vs. No. 6 Duke	4–16	ESPN2	6,870	
*Game times in EDT. # – Rankings denote tournament seed.

=== Pool A ===
Pos	Team	Pld	W	L	RF	RA	RD	PCT	Qualification
1	(8) Wake Forest	2	2	0	17	5	+12	1.000	Advance to Semifinals
2	(1) North Carolina	2	1	1	17	11	+6	.500	Eliminated
3	(12) Pittsburgh	2	0	2	2	20	−18	.000	Eliminated

May 22; 3:00 p.m. Game 5	(12) Pittsburgh	1−8	(8) Wake Forest	Truist Field; Attendance: 3,494; Umpires: HP: Jeff Gosney; 1B: Jon Byrne; 2B: Adam Dowdy; 3B: Linus Baker
May 22; 3:00 p.m. Game 5	LP: A. Coleman (3−3)	Boxscore	WP: Z. Johnston (3−2)	Truist Field; Attendance: 3,494; Umpires: HP: Jeff Gosney; 1B: Jon Byrne; 2B: Adam Dowdy; 3B: Linus Baker
May 22; 3:00 p.m. Game 5		Boxscore	HR: Reinisch (18), Houston (7), Gill (3)	Truist Field; Attendance: 3,494; Umpires: HP: Jeff Gosney; 1B: Jon Byrne; 2B: Adam Dowdy; 3B: Linus Baker

May 23; 3:00 p.m. Game 8	(1) North Carolina	12–2	(12) Pittsburgh	Truist Field; Attendance: 4,263; Umpires: HP: Craig Barron; 1B: Ryan Clark; 2B: Travis Carlson; 3B: Greg Street
May 23; 3:00 p.m. Game 8	WP: J. DeCaro (5–1)	Boxscore	LP: Andrade (2–4)	Truist Field; Attendance: 4,263; Umpires: HP: Craig Barron; 1B: Ryan Clark; 2B: Travis Carlson; 3B: Greg Street
May 23; 3:00 p.m. Game 8	HR: Donofrio 2 (7), Cook 2 (18), Harber (20), Osuna (14)	Boxscore	HR: Funk (11)	Truist Field; Attendance: 4,263; Umpires: HP: Craig Barron; 1B: Ryan Clark; 2B: Travis Carlson; 3B: Greg Street

May 24; 7:00 p.m. Game 12	(8) Wake Forest	9–5 (F/12)	(1) North Carolina	Truist Field; Attendance: 9,296; Umpires: HP: Adam Dowdy; 1B: Doug Vines; 2B: Perry Costello; 3B: Jon Byrne
May 24; 7:00 p.m. Game 12	WP: B. Shenosky (5–3)	Boxscore	LP: B. Peterson (2–2)	Truist Field; Attendance: 9,296; Umpires: HP: Adam Dowdy; 1B: Doug Vines; 2B: Perry Costello; 3B: Jon Byrne
May 24; 7:00 p.m. Game 12	HR: Houston (8), Kurtz (22), Tellier (13), Gill (4)	Boxscore		Truist Field; Attendance: 9,296; Umpires: HP: Adam Dowdy; 1B: Doug Vines; 2B: Perry Costello; 3B: Jon Byrne

=== Pool B ===
Pos	Team	Pld	W	L	RF	RA	RD	PCT	Qualification
1	(11) Miami	2	2	0	16	12	+4	1.000	Advance to Semifinals
2	(2) Clemson	2	1	1	15	15	0	.500	Eliminated
3	(7) Louisville	2	0	2	12	16	−4	.000	Eliminated

May 21; 11:00 a.m. Game 1	(11) Miami	8−5	(7) Louisville	Truist Field; Attendance: 2,695; Umpires: HP: Doug Vines; 1B: Greg Street; 2B: Craig Barron; 3B: Ryan Clark
May 21; 11:00 a.m. Game 1	WP: R. Schlesinger (5−5); Sv: M. Caba (4)	Boxscore	LP: E. Webster (5−3)	Truist Field; Attendance: 2,695; Umpires: HP: Doug Vines; 1B: Greg Street; 2B: Craig Barron; 3B: Ryan Clark
May 21; 11:00 a.m. Game 1	HR: Cuvet (25), Costello (8)	Boxscore	HR: Benson (8), Rose (6)	Truist Field; Attendance: 2,695; Umpires: HP: Doug Vines; 1B: Greg Street; 2B: Craig Barron; 3B: Ryan Clark

May 23; 11:00 a.m. Game 7	(2) Clemson	7–8	(11) Miami	Truist Field; Attendance: 3,907; Umpires: HP: Jon Byrne; 1B: Adam Dowdy; 2B: Linus Baker; 3B: Perry Costello
May 23; 11:00 a.m. Game 7	LP: E. Darden (5–4)	Boxscore	WP: G. Ziehl (5–3); Sv: Caba (5)	Truist Field; Attendance: 3,907; Umpires: HP: Jon Byrne; 1B: Adam Dowdy; 2B: Linus Baker; 3B: Perry Costello
May 23; 11:00 a.m. Game 7	HR: Hinderlider (13)	Boxscore	HR: Kulikowski (2), Jimenez (2)	Truist Field; Attendance: 3,907; Umpires: HP: Jon Byrne; 1B: Adam Dowdy; 2B: Linus Baker; 3B: Perry Costello

May 24; 3:00 p.m. Game 11	(7) Louisville	7–8	(2) Clemson	Truist Field; Attendance: 4,782; Umpires: HP: Brian Miller; 1B: Linus Baker; 2B: Jeff Gosney; 3B: Barry Chambers
May 24; 3:00 p.m. Game 11	LP: T. Biven (4–2)	Boxscore	WP: A. Gordon (1–2)	Truist Field; Attendance: 4,782; Umpires: HP: Brian Miller; 1B: Linus Baker; 2B: Jeff Gosney; 3B: Barry Chambers
May 24; 3:00 p.m. Game 11	HR: Benson (9), Napleton (11)	Boxscore	HR: Obertop (19), Jarrell (6)	Truist Field; Attendance: 4,782; Umpires: HP: Brian Miller; 1B: Linus Baker; 2B: Jeff Gosney; 3B: Barry Chambers

=== Pool C ===
Pos	Team	Pld	W	L	RF	RA	RD	PCT	Qualification
1	(6) Duke	2	2	0	19	9	+10	1.000	Advance to Semifinals
2	(3) NC State	2	1	1	20	17	+3	.500	Eliminated
3	(10) Virginia Tech	2	0	2	17	30	−13	.000	Eliminated

May 21; 7:00 p.m. Game 3	(10) Virginia Tech	8–11	(6) Duke	Truist Field; Attendance: 3,842; Umpires: HP: Travis Carlson; 1B: Jeff Gosney; 2B: Jon Byrne; 3B: Adam Dowdy
May 21; 7:00 p.m. Game 3	LP: M. Siverling (2–2)	Boxscore	WP: J. Tallon (2–0); Sv: C. Beilenson (12)	Truist Field; Attendance: 3,842; Umpires: HP: Travis Carlson; 1B: Jeff Gosney; 2B: Jon Byrne; 3B: Adam Dowdy
May 21; 7:00 p.m. Game 3	HR: DeMartini (21), McCann (9)	Boxscore	HR: Morris 2 (17), Stone (12)	Truist Field; Attendance: 3,842; Umpires: HP: Travis Carlson; 1B: Jeff Gosney; 2B: Jon Byrne; 3B: Adam Dowdy

May 22; 7:00 p.m. Game 6	(3) NC State	19–9	(10) Virginia Tech	Truist Field; Attendance: 4,651; Umpires: HP: Greg Street; 1B: Craig Barron; 2B: Ryan Clark; 3B: Travis Carlson
May 22; 7:00 p.m. Game 6	WP: P. Labriola (1–0)	Boxscore	LP: B. Renfrow (6–4)	Truist Field; Attendance: 4,651; Umpires: HP: Greg Street; 1B: Craig Barron; 2B: Ryan Clark; 3B: Travis Carlson
May 22; 7:00 p.m. Game 6	HR: Serrano III (6), Butterworth (7), Sosa (5)	Boxscore	HR: Ebel (12)	Truist Field; Attendance: 4,651; Umpires: HP: Greg Street; 1B: Craig Barron; 2B: Ryan Clark; 3B: Travis Carlson

May 23; 7:00 p.m. Game 9	(6) Duke	8–1	(3) NC State	Truist Field; Attendance: 5,696; Umpires: HP: Barry Chambers; 1B: Brian Miller; 2B: Doug Vines; 3B: Jeff Gosney
May 23; 7:00 p.m. Game 9	WP: A. Healy (3–1)	Boxscore	LP: S. Highfill (5–2)	Truist Field; Attendance: 5,696; Umpires: HP: Barry Chambers; 1B: Brian Miller; 2B: Doug Vines; 3B: Jeff Gosney
May 23; 7:00 p.m. Game 9	HR: Morris (18), Gracia (13), Krewson (5), Obee (13)	Boxscore		Truist Field; Attendance: 5,696; Umpires: HP: Barry Chambers; 1B: Brian Miller; 2B: Doug Vines; 3B: Jeff Gosney

=== Pool D ===
Pos	Team	Pld	W	L	RF	RA	RD	PCT	Qualification
1	(5) Florida State	2	2	0	24	16	+8	1.000	Advance to Semifinals
2	(4) Virginia	2	1	1	20	12	+8	.500	Eliminated
3	(9) Georgia Tech	2	0	2	9	25	−16	.000	Eliminated

May 21; 3:00 p.m. Game 2	(9) Georgia Tech	9−12	(5) Florida State	Truist Field; Attendance: 2,997; Umpires: HP: Linus Baker; 1B: Perry Costello; 2B: Barry Chambers; 3B: Brian Miller
May 21; 3:00 p.m. Game 2	LP: T. McKee (4−5)	Boxscore	WP: J. Abraham (4−1); Sv: J. Arnold (1)	Truist Field; Attendance: 2,997; Umpires: HP: Linus Baker; 1B: Perry Costello; 2B: Barry Chambers; 3B: Brian Miller
May 21; 3:00 p.m. Game 2	HR: Burress (23), Jones (5)	Boxscore	HR: Ferrer (16), Dinges (13), Cantu (7), Faurot (6)	Truist Field; Attendance: 2,997; Umpires: HP: Linus Baker; 1B: Perry Costello; 2B: Barry Chambers; 3B: Brian Miller

May 22; 11:00 a.m. Game 4	(4) Virginia	13−0 (F/7)	(9) Georgia Tech	Truist Field; Attendance: 2,919; Umpires: HP: Perry Costello; 1B: Barry Chambers; 2B: Brian Miller; 3B: Doug Vines
May 22; 11:00 a.m. Game 4	WP: Blanco (7−3)	Boxscore	LP: A. Finateri (5−4)	Truist Field; Attendance: 2,919; Umpires: HP: Perry Costello; 1B: Barry Chambers; 2B: Brian Miller; 3B: Doug Vines
May 22; 11:00 a.m. Game 4	HR: Didawick (23), Saucke (12), Godbout (7)	Boxscore		Truist Field; Attendance: 2,919; Umpires: HP: Perry Costello; 1B: Barry Chambers; 2B: Brian Miller; 3B: Doug Vines

May 24; 11:00 a.m. Game 10	(5) Florida State	12−7	(4) Virginia	Truist Field; Attendance: 4,305; Umpires: HP: Ryan Clark; 1B: Travis Carlson; 2B: Greg Street; 3B: Craig Barron
May 24; 11:00 a.m. Game 10	WP: J. Arnold (10−3); Sv: B. Oxford (5)	Boxscore	LP: J. Savino (2−2)	Truist Field; Attendance: 4,305; Umpires: HP: Ryan Clark; 1B: Travis Carlson; 2B: Greg Street; 3B: Craig Barron
May 24; 11:00 a.m. Game 10	HR: Tibbs (25)	Boxscore	HR: O'Ferrall (5), Saucke (13), Anderson (8), Hanson (7)	Truist Field; Attendance: 4,305; Umpires: HP: Ryan Clark; 1B: Travis Carlson; 2B: Greg Street; 3B: Craig Barron

== Playoffs ==
Semifinals
5	Florida State	9
8	Wake Forest	6
11	Miami	2
6	Duke	8

Finals
5	Florida State	4
6	Duke	16

=== Semifinals ===
May 25; 1:00 p.m. ET; Semifinal 1	(5) Florida State	9–6	(8) Wake Forest	Truist Field; Attendance: 5,642; Umpires: HP: Jeff Gosney; 1B: Craig Barron; 2B: Brian Miller; 3B: Greg Street
May 25; 1:00 p.m. ET; Semifinal 1	WP: J. Abraham (5–1); Sv: C. Whittaker (1)	Boxscore	LP: J. Hartle (6–3)	Truist Field; Attendance: 5,642; Umpires: HP: Jeff Gosney; 1B: Craig Barron; 2B: Brian Miller; 3B: Greg Street
May 25; 1:00 p.m. ET; Semifinal 1	HR: Williams (9)	Boxscore	HR: Ballestero (2)	Truist Field; Attendance: 5,642; Umpires: HP: Jeff Gosney; 1B: Craig Barron; 2B: Brian Miller; 3B: Greg Street

May 25; 5:00 p.m. ET; Semifinal 2	(11) Miami	2–8	(6) Duke	Truist Field; Attendance: 5,879; Umpires: HP: Linus Baker; 1B: Barry Chambers; 2B: Doug Vines; 3B: Perry Costello
May 25; 5:00 p.m. ET; Semifinal 2	LP: N. Robert (5–4	Boxscore	WP: C. Beilenson (7–3)	Truist Field; Attendance: 5,879; Umpires: HP: Linus Baker; 1B: Barry Chambers; 2B: Doug Vines; 3B: Perry Costello
May 25; 5:00 p.m. ET; Semifinal 2	HR: Cuvet (26)	Boxscore	HR: Stone (13), Obee (14)	Truist Field; Attendance: 5,879; Umpires: HP: Linus Baker; 1B: Barry Chambers; 2B: Doug Vines; 3B: Perry Costello

=== Championship Game ===
ACC Championship
(5) Florida State	vs.	(6) Duke

May 26, 2024 12:00 p.m. (EDT) at Truist Field in Charlotte, North Carolina
Team	1	2	3	4	5	6	7	8	9	R	H	E
(6) Duke	0	5	0	4	0	5	2	0	0	16	16	0
(5) Florida State	2	0	0	2	0	0	0	0	0	4	11	0
WP: T. Noone (4–3) LP: C. Dorsey (5–4); Home runs: DUKE: Miller (15), Obee(15); FSU: Ferrer (17); Attendance: 6,870; Umpires: HP: Travis Carlson; 1B: Craig Barron; 2B: Greg Street; 3B: Jeff Gosney; Boxscore

== All Tournament Team ==
Position	Player	Team
C	Alex Stone	Duke
1B	Nick Kurtz	Wake Forest
2B	Drew Faurot	Florida State
3B	Daniel Cuvet	Miami
SS	Griff O'Ferrall	Virginia
OF	**Devin Obee**	Duke
OF	Anthony Donofrio	North Carolina
OF	James Tibbs III	Florida State
DH	Marco Dinges	Florida State
P	Charlie Beilenson	Duke
P	Chase Burns	Wake Forest

MVP in bold.
