= Dylan Dreiling =

American baseball player (born 2003)

Texas Rangers
- Outfielder
- Born: April 17, 2003 (age 23); Hays, Kansas, U.S.
- Bats: Left Throws: Left

Career highlights and awards
- College World Series Most Outstanding Player (2024); College World Series champion (2024)

Dylan Matthew Dreiling (born April 17, 2003) is an American professional baseball outfielder in the Texas Rangers organization. He played college baseball for the Tennessee Volunteers.

== Amateur career ==
Dreiling attended Hays High School in Hays, Kansas, and played for the school's baseball team. In 2022, his senior year, the Kansas Baseball Coaches Association named him the player of the year for Kansas in Class 5A.

Dreiling attended the University of Tennessee and played college baseball for the Tennessee Volunteers. In 2024, Dreiling was named to the All-Southeastern Conference's first team. The Volunteers won the 2024 College World Series and Dreiling, who hit home runs in each of the three games of the final series against Texas A&M, was named the College World Series Most Outstanding Player. He finished the 2024 season with a .341 batting average, 23 home runs, and 75 RBI across 71 games.

== Professional career ==
The Texas Rangers selected Dreiling in the second round, with the 65th overall selection, of the 2024 MLB draft. He signed with Texas on July 24, 2024, for a $1,287,600 signing bonus.

Dreiling made his professional debut after signing with the High-A Hickory Crawdads and hit .198 with one home run across 24 games. He returned to Hickory for the 2025 season and batted .226 with 12 home runs and 62 RBI over 110 games. In 2026, Dreiling played with the Double-A Frisco RoughRiders with whom he played in 116 games and hit .312 with 22 home runs and 84 RBI.
