= 2024 North Carolina Tar Heels baseball team =

American college baseball season

2024 North Carolina Tar Heels baseball

ACC Coastal Division champions ACC regular season champions Chapel Hill Regional champions Chapel Hill Super Regional champions

College World Series, 1–2
- Conference: Atlantic Coast Conference

Ranking
- Coaches: No. 5
- Record: 48–16 (22–8 ACC)
- Head coach: Scott Forbes (4th season)
- Assistant coaches: Bryant Gaines (14th season); Jesse Wierzbicki (8th season); Jason Howell (4th season)
- Captains: Jake Knapp; Jackson Van De Brake
- Home stadium: Boshamer Stadium

2024 Atlantic Coast Conference baseball standings
	Conf.				Overall
Team	W		L	PCT	W		L	PCT
Atlantic
No. 9 Clemson ^{x}‍‍‍^{y}	20	–	10	.667	44	–	16	.733
No. 6 NC State ‍‍‍^{y}	18	–	11	.621	38	–	23	.623
No. 4 Florida State ‍‍‍^{y}	17	–	12	.586	49	–	17	.742
Louisville ‍‍‍	16	–	14	.533	32	–	24	.571
No. 19 Wake Forest ‍‍‍^{y}	15	–	15	.500	38	–	22	.633
Notre Dame ‍‍‍	9	–	21	.300	27	–	25	.519
Boston College ‍‍‍	8	–	22	.267	22	–	31	.415
Coastal
No. 5 North Carolina ^{x}‍‍‍^{y}	22	–	8	.733	48	–	16	.750
No. 7 Virginia ‍‍‍^{y}	18	–	12	.600	46	–	17	.730
No. 24 Duke ‍‍‡‍^{y}	16	–	14	.533	40	–	20	.667
Georgia Tech ‍‍‍^{y}	15	–	15	.500	33	–	25	.569
Virginia Tech ‍‍‍	14	–	16	.467	32	–	22	.593
Miami (FL) ‍‍‍	11	–	19	.367	26	–	30	.464
Pittsburgh ‍‍‍	10	–	20	.333	26	–	28	.481
x – Division champion ‡ – Tournament champion y – Invited to the NCAA Tournament; As of June 26, 2024; Rankings from D1Baseball

The 2024 North Carolina Tar Heels baseball team represented the University of North Carolina at Chapel Hill in the 2024 NCAA Division I baseball season. The Tar Heels played their home games at Boshamer Stadium as a member of the Atlantic Coast Conference. They were led by head coach Scott Forbes, in his fourth season as head coach. Forbes was assisted by Bryant Gaines, Jesse Wierzbicki, and Jason Howell. Dave Arendas served as director of operations.

== Previous season ==
In Forbes' third year as head coach, the Tar Heels regressed from their 2021 campaign. Finishing the season 36–24, the 2023 Tar Heels beat Virginia and Georgia Tech in their pool before losing in the semifinals to the eventual champion Clemson in the ACC Tournament. The Tar Heels received an at-large bid in the Terre Haute regional as a part of the NCAA Tournament. They lost to Iowa in the opening game but beat Wright State to force an elimination game against Iowa, who they lost to again in 13 innings.

== Personnel ==
=== Roster ===
Class Listing as reflected on GoHeels.com

2024 North Carolina Tar Heels roster
Pitchers: 15 - Cameron Padgett - Sophomore; 17 - Boston Flannery - Freshman; 24 - Matthew Matthijs - Sophomore; 25 - Ben Peterson - Senior; 26 - Kyle Percival - Sophomore; 27 - Connor Bovair - Senior; 28 - Shea Sprague - Junior; 29 - Jason DeCaro - Freshman; 31 - Olin Johnson - Freshman; 35 - Francesco Capocci - Freshman; 36 - Folger Boaz - Freshman; 38 - Matt Poston - Senior; 39 - Harrison Lewis - Freshman; 41 - Jacob Kirby - Freshman; 42 - Jake Knapp - Graduate; 46 - Will Simmons - Sophomore; 47 - Aidan Haugh - Junior; 49 - Dalton Pence - Junior; 50 - Hugh Collins - Freshman; 51 - Ryan Fischer - Graduate; 54 - Mason Yokum - Freshman; 56 - Luke Osteen - Freshman; 57 - Ryan Hench - Freshman	Catchers: 44 - Luke Stevenson - Freshman; 52 - Parker Haskin - Graduate; Infielders: 1 - Alex Madera - Graduate; 3 - Colby Wilkerson - Senior; 5 - Gavin Gallaher - Freshman; 6 - Jackson Van De Brake - Senior; 10 - Eliot Dix - Graduate; 14 - Parks Harber - Senior; 19 - Johnny Castagnozzi - Junior; 43 - Tyler Parks - Freshman; 45 - Hunter Stokely - Senior	Outfielders: 2 - Reece Holbrook - Sophomore; 4 - Anthony Donofrio - Graduate; 7 - Vance Honeycutt - Junior; 16 - Casey Cook - (redshirt) Sophomore; 18 - Carter French - Sophomore; 20 - Kaleb Cost - Freshman; Utility: 8 - Patrick Alvarez (INF/OF) - Senior; 12 - Ryker Galaska (INF/OF) - Junior; 23 - Alberto Osuna (1B/DH) - Senior

=== Coaching staff ===
2024 North Carolina Tar Heels coaching staff
Name	Position	Seasons	Alma mater
Scott Forbes	Head coach	4	NC Wesleyan (1998)
Bryant Gaines	Assistant Head Coach/Recruiting Coordinator	14	North Carolina (2011)
Jesse Wierzbicki	Assistant Coach	8	North Carolina (2011)
Jason Howell	Assistant Coach	4	North Carolina (2002)
Dave Arendas	Director of Baseball Operations	19	North Carolina (1990)

== Schedule and results ==
Legend
	Win
	Loss
	Postponement
**Bold**	North Carolina team member
*	Non-Conference game
†	Make-Up Game

2024 North Carolina Tar Heels Baseball Schedule & Results
Regular Season
February (7–2)

Date	Opponent	Rank	Site/Stadium	Score	Win	Loss	Save	Attendance	Overall Record	ACC Record
February 16	Wagner*	No. 15	Boshamer Stadium; Chapel Hill, NC	**W** 10–3	**Boaz** (1–0)	Wright (0–1)	None	2,837	1–0	–
February 17	Wagner*	No. 15	Boshamer Stadium	**W** 16–5	**Pence** (1–0)	Bilka (0–1)	None	2,193	2–0	–
February 18	Wagner*	No. 15	Boshamer Stadium	**W** 20–6	**Percival** (1–0)	Taudin-Chabot (0–1)	None	2,709	3–0	–
February 20	Elon*	No. 15	Boshamer Stadium	**W** 8–7	**Matthijs** (1–0)	Spinoza (0–1)	**Pence** (1)	2,018	4–0	–
February 23	No. 11 East Carolina*	No. 15	Boshamer Stadium	**W** 2–1	**Matthijs** (2–0)	Beal (0–1)	**Poston** (1)	3,845	5–0	–
February 24	vs. No. 11 East Carolina*	No. 15	Segra Stadium; Fayetteville, NC	**L** 4–7	Root (2–0)	**Peterson** (0–1)	Beal (1)	6,228	5–1	–
February 25	at No. 11 East Carolina*	No. 15	Clark–LeClair Stadium; Greenville, NC	**L** 9–10	Dilorenzo (1–0)	**Sprague** (0–1)	None	6,017	5–2	–
February 27	VCU*	No. 17	Boshamer Stadium	**W** 8–2	**DeCaro** (1–0)	Peters (1–2)	None	1,822	6–2	–
February 28	Longwood*	No. 17	Boshamer Stadium	**W** 12–3	**Matthijs** (3–0)	Simmons (0–1)	**Fischer** (1)	1,793	7–2	–

March (18–2)

Date	Opponent	Rank	Site/Stadium	Score	Win	Loss	Save	Attendance	Overall Record	ACC Record
March 1	Princeton*	No. 17	Boshamer Stadium	**W** 12–2	**Boaz** (2–0)	Episcope (0–2)	None	1,809	8–2	–
March 2	Princeton*	No. 17	Boshamer Stadium	**W** 11–2	**Pence** (2–0)	Kim (1–1)	None	2,496	9–2	–
March 3	Princeton*	No. 17	Boshamer Stadium	**W** 13–6	**Matthijs** (4–0)	Ferrer-Westrop (0–2)	None	2,756	10–2	–
March 5	at No. 22 Campbell*	No. 16	Jim Perry Stadium; Buies Creek, NC	**W** 7–3	**Poston** (1–0)	Roberts (2–1)	None	1,403	11–2	–
March 8	Pitt	No. 16	Boshamer Stadium	**W** 2–1	**Matthijs** (5–0)	Fernandez (1–1)	**Poston** (2)	2,323	12–2	1–0
March 9	Pitt	No. 16	Boshamer Stadium	**W** 7–4	**Matthijs** (6–0)	Firoved (2–1)	None	2,027	13–2	2–0
March 10	Pitt	No. 16	Boshamer Stadium	**W** 6–5 (10)	**Haugh** (1–0)	Fox (2–1)	None	2,281	14–2	3–0
March 12	Rutgers*	No. 15	Boshamer Stadium	**W** 13–7	**Matthijs** (7–0)	Mazza (0–1)	None	2,006	15–2	–
March 13	Rutgers*	No. 15	Boshamer Stadium	**W** 9–8	**Percival** (2–0)	Gorski (1–1)	**Poston** (3)	2,205	16–2	–
March 15	at Miami (FL)	No. 15	Mark Light Field; Coral Gables, FL	**L** 1–14	Ziehl (1–1)	**Boaz** (2–1)	None	2,874	16–3	3–1
March 16	at Miami (FL)	No. 15	Mark Light Field	**L** 1–2	Robert (3–0)	**Matthijs** (7–1)	None	3,036	16–4	3–2
March 17	at Miami (FL)	No. 15	Mark Light Field	**W** 18–6 (7)	**Matthijs** (8–1)	Hernandez (2–2)	None	2,621	17–4	4–2
March 19	UNC Wilmington*	No. 20	Boshamer Stadium	**W** 11–0 (7)	**Johnson** (1–0)	Phelan (0–3)	None	2,438	18–4	–
March 22	Georgia Tech	No. 20	Boshamer Stadium	**W** 5–4	**Matthijs** (9–1)	Patel (1–2)	**Pence** (2)	1,915	19–4	5–2
March 23	Georgia Tech	No. 20	Boshamer Stadium	**W** 11–5	**Percvial** (3–0)	McKee (2–2)	**Poston** (4)	2,594	20–4	6–2
March 24	Georgia Tech	No. 20	Boshamer Stadium	**W** 9–2	**Sprague** (1–1)	McGuire (2–1)	None	2,408	21–4	7–2
March 26	North Carolina A&T*	No. 14	Boshamer Stadium	**W** 10–5	**Matthijs** (10–1)	Brewington (0–1)	None	2,630	22–4	–
March 29	at No. 12 Wake Forest	No. 14	David F. Couch Ballpark; Winston-Salem, NC	**W** 6–5	**Boaz** (3–1)	Burns (5–1)	**Pence** (3)	3,514	23–4	8–2
March 30	at No. 12 Wake Forest	No. 14	David F. Couch Ballpark	**W** 10–6	**Percival** (4–0)	Falco Jr. (0–2)	None	3,514	24–4	9–2
March 31	at No. 12 Wake Forest	No. 14	David F. Couch Ballpark	**W** 14–10	**Matthijs** (11–1)	Shenosky (2–2)	None	3,514	25–4	10–2

April (9–7)

Date	Opponent	Rank	Site/Stadium	Score	Win	Loss	Save	Attendance	Overall Record	ACC Record
April 4	at No. 15 Virginia	No. 10	Disharoon Park; Charlottesville, VA	**L** 11–14	Augustin (2–0)	**Pence** (2–1)	None	3,734	25–5	10–3
April 5	at No. 15 Virginia	No. 10	Disharoon Park	**L** 2–7	Blanco (5–1)	**DeCaro** (1–1)	Coady (1)	4,475	25–6	10–4
April 6	at No. 15 Virginia	No. 10	Disharoon Park	**W** 12–7	**Poston** (2–0)	Teel (2–2)	None	5,919	26–6	11–4
April 9	vs. South Carolina*	No. 13	Truist Field; Charlotte, NC	**L** 1–2	McCreery (2–0)	**Matthijs** (11–2)	None	4,092	26–7	–
April 12	Notre Dame	No. 13	Boshamer Stadium	**W** 13–0	**DeCaro** (2–1)	Bedford (1–5)	None	2,523	27–7	12–4
April 13	Notre Dame	No. 13	Boshamer Stadium	**W** 7–2	**Sprague** (2–1)	Radel (2–2)	None	3,887	28–7	13–4
April 14	Notre Dame	No. 13	Boshamer Stadium	**W** 10–3	**Haugh** (2–0)	Fox (1–1)	None	3,169	29–7	14–4
April 16	No. 19 Coastal Carolina*	No. 11	Boshamer Stadium	**L** 4–5	Carbone (5–1)	**Poston** (2–1)	Hinkel (1)	3,268	29–8	–
April 18	at NC State	No. 11	Doak Field; Raleigh, NC	**L** 8–9	Smith (3–0)	**Poston** (2–2)	None	3,048	29–9	14–5
April 19	NC State	No. 11	Doak Field	**L** 4–5	Lucas (1–0)	**Matthijs** (11–3)	Dudan (4)	3,048	29–10	14–6
April 20	NC State	No. 11	Boshamer Stadium	**W** 14–3	**Haugh** (3–0)	Consiglio (2–3)	**Bovair** (1)	3,048	30–10	15–6
April 23	Gardner–Webb*	No. 15	Boshamer Stadium	**W** 5–2	**Bovair** (1–0)	Hodges (0–2)	**Pence** (4)	2,265	31–10	–
April 26	Virginia Tech	No. 15	Boshamer Stadium	**W** 8–1	**DeCaro** (3–1)	Neff (0–1)	None	3,764	32–10	16–6
April 27	Virginia Tech	No. 15	Boshamer Stadium	**W** 6–3	**Sprague** (3–1)	Renfrow (5–2)	**Pence** (5)	3,642	33–10	17–6
April 28	Virginia Tech	No. 15	Boshamer Stadium	**L** 3–4	Kirtner (7–0)	**Haugh** (1–1)	Little (6)	3,165	33–11	17–7
April 30	Charlotte*	No. 12	Boshamer Stadium	**W** 13–1 (7)	**Padgett** (1–0)	Hansen (1–7)	None	2,268	34–11	–

May (7–1)

Date	Opponent	Rank	Site/Stadium	Score	Win	Loss	Save	Attendance	Overall Record	ACC Record
May 1	William and Mary*	No. 12	Boshamer Stadium	**W** 19–2	**Peterson** (1–1)	Lippman (0–1)	None	2,485	35–11	–
May 7	Campbell*	No. 11	Boshamer Stadium	**W** 16–10	**Peterson** (2–1)	Cox (0–2)	None	3,003	36–11	–
May 10	Louisville	No. 11	Boshamer Stadium	**W** 14–4	**DeCaro** (4–1)	Gongora (5–4)	None	2,840	37–11	18–7
May 11	Louisville	No. 11	Boshamer Stadium	**W** 6–4	**Poston** (3–2)	Webster (4–2)	**Pence** (6)	2,893	38–11	19–7
May 12	Louisville	No. 11	Boshamer Stadium	**W** 16–7	**Haugh** (4–1)	Hartman (0–2)	**Peterson** (1)	2,616	39–11	20–7
May 14	at UNC Wilmington	No. 7	Brooks Field; Wilmington, NC	Canceled (inclement weather)						
May 16	at No. 11 Duke	No. 7	Jack Coombs Field; Durham, NC	**L** 3–5	Beilenson (6–2)	**Matthijs** (11–4)	None	1,227	39–12	20–8
May 17	at No. 11 Duke	No. 7	Jack Coombs Field	**W** 6–4	**Pence** (3–1)	Beilenson (6–3)	None	1,147	40–12	21–8
May 18	at No. 11 Duke	No. 7	Jack Coombs Field	**W** 14–6	**Matthijs** (12–4)	Oschell III (0–2)	None	1,863	41–12	22–8

Postseason
ACC Tournament (1–1)

Date	Opponent	Rank	Site/Stadium	Score	Win	Loss	Save	Attendance	Overall Record	ACCT Record
May 23	vs. (12) Pitt	(1) No. 7	Truist Field	**W** 12–2	**DeCaro** (5–1)	Andrade (2–4)	None	4,263	42–12	1–0
May 24	vs. No. 22 (8) Wake Forest	(1) No. 7	Truist Field	**L** 5–9 (12)	Shenosky (5–3)	**Peterson** (2–2)	None	9,296	42–13	1–1

NCAA Tournament: Chapel Hill Regional (3–1)

Date	Opponent	Rank	Site/Stadium	Score	Win	Loss	Save	Attendance	Overall Record	NCAAT Record
May 31	vs. (4) LIU	(1) No. 6	Boshamer Stadium	**W** 11–8	**Poston** (4–2)	DeCastro (4–4)	None	3,802	43–13	1–0
June 1	vs. (2) No. 24 LSU	(1) No. 6	Boshamer Stadium	**W** 6–2	**Peterson** (3–2)	Holman (9–3)	**Pence** (7)	3,919	44–13	2–0
June 2	vs. (2) No. 24 LSU	(1) No. 6	Boshamer Stadium	**L** 4–8	Hurd (3–4)	**Haugh** (4–2)	None	4,098	44–14	2–1
June 3	vs. (2) No. 24 LSU	(1) No. 6	Boshamer Stadium	**W** 4–3 (10)	**Pence** (4–1)	Jump (6–2)	None	4,026	45–14	3–1

NCAA Tournament: Chapel Hill Super Regional (2–0)

Date	Opponent	Rank	Site/Stadium	Score	Win	Loss	Save	Attendance	Overall Record	NCAAT Record
June 7	vs. West Virginia	No. 4	Boshamer Stadium	**W** 8–6	**Poston** (5–2)	Clark (8–3)	None	4,139	46–14	1–0
June 8	vs. West Virginia	No. 4	Boshamer Stadium	**W** 2–1	**DeCaro** (6–1)	Switalksi (5–3)	**Pence** (8)	4,491	47–14	2–0

NCAA Tournament: College World Series (1–2)

Date	Opponent	Rank	Site/Stadium	Score	Win	Loss	Save	Attendance	Overall Record	NCAAT Record
June 14	vs. No. 12 Virginia	No. 4	Charles Schwab Field; Omaha, NE	**W** 3–2	**Pence** (5–1)	Hungate (7–2)	None	23,990	48–14	1–0
June 16	vs. No. 1 Tennessee	No. 4	Charles Schwab Field	**L** 1–6	Beam (9–2)	**Sprague** (3–2)	None	25,140	48–15	1–1
June 18	vs. No. 8 Florida State	No. 4	Charles Schwab Field	**L** 5–9	Hults (3–1)	**Haugh** (4–3)	None	23,047	48–16	1–2

Rankings from D1Baseball

=== Chapel Hill Super Regional ===
Regional	Regional
1	Arizona	4
4	**Grand Canyon**	**9**
4	Grand Canyon	2
3	**West Virginia**	**5**
3	**West Virginia**	**4**
2	Dallas Baptist	1
Tucson Regional – Hi Corbett Field
1	Arizona	0
2	**Dallas Baptist**	7
4	**Grand Canyon**	12
2	Dallas Baptist	10
1	**North Carolina**	**11**
4	LIU	8
1	**North Carolina**	**6**
2	LSU	2
3	Wofford	3
2	**LSU**	**4**
Chapel Hill Regional – Boshamer Stadium
4	LIU	2
3	**Wofford**	**5**
2	**LSU**	**13**
3	Wofford	6

Regional Final
3	**West Virginia**	**10**	–
4	Grand Canyon	6	–
1	**North Carolina**	4	**4^{10}**
2	LSU	**8**	3

Super Regional
West Virginia	6	1	–
4	**North Carolina**	**8**	**2**	–

== Rankings ==
Ranking movements Legend: ██ Increase in ranking ██ Decrease in ranking
	Week																		
Poll	Pre	1	2	3	4	5	6	7	8	9	10	11	12	13	14	15	16	17	Final
Coaches'	15	15*	17	17	13	17	11	7	12	11	14	12	11	5	6	5	5	5	
Baseball America	17	16	17	16	14	23	19	13	14	11	12	7	8	4	3	3	3	3	
NCBWA†	16	14	16	14	11	17	11	7	13	11	14	9	10	5	6	4	4	4	
D1Baseball	15	15	17	16	15	20	14	10	13	11	15	12	11	7	7	6	6	6	

† NCBWA ranks 30 teams in their preseason poll, but only ranks 25 teams weekly during the season.
* A new poll was not released for this week, so for comparison purposes, the previous week's ranking is inserted in this week's slot.
