= 2024 Virginia Cavaliers baseball team =

American college baseball season

2024 Virginia Cavaliers baseball

Charlottesville Regional champions Charlottesville Super Regional champions

College World Series, 0–2
- Conference: Atlantic Coast Conference

Ranking
- Coaches: No. 12
- D1Baseball.com: No. 16
- Record: 46–17 (18–12 ACC)
- Head coach: Brian O'Connor (21st season)
- Assistant coaches: Kevin McMullan (21st season); Matt Kirby (13th season)
- Pitching coach: Drew Dickinson (5th season)
- Home stadium: Davenport Field

2024 Atlantic Coast Conference baseball standings
| | Conf. | | | | Overall |
| Team | W | | L | PCT | W | | L | PCT |
|---|---|---|---|---|---|---|---|---|
Atlantic
| No. 9 Clemson ^{x}‍‍‍^{y} | 20 | – | 10 | .667 | 44 | – | 16 | .733 |
| No. 6 NC State ‍‍‍^{y} | 18 | – | 11 | .621 | 38 | – | 23 | .623 |
| No. 4 Florida State ‍‍‍^{y} | 17 | – | 12 | .586 | 49 | – | 17 | .742 |
| Louisville ‍‍‍ | 16 | – | 14 | .533 | 32 | – | 24 | .571 |
| No. 19 Wake Forest ‍‍‍^{y} | 15 | – | 15 | .500 | 38 | – | 22 | .633 |
| Notre Dame ‍‍‍ | 9 | – | 21 | .300 | 27 | – | 25 | .519 |
| Boston College ‍‍‍ | 8 | – | 22 | .267 | 22 | – | 31 | .415 |
Coastal
| No. 5 North Carolina ^{x}‍‍‍^{y} | 22 | – | 8 | .733 | 48 | – | 16 | .750 |
| No. 7 Virginia ‍‍‍^{y} | 18 | – | 12 | .600 | 46 | – | 17 | .730 |
| No. 24 Duke ‍‍‡‍^{y} | 16 | – | 14 | .533 | 40 | – | 20 | .667 |
| Georgia Tech ‍‍‍^{y} | 15 | – | 15 | .500 | 33 | – | 25 | .569 |
| Virginia Tech ‍‍‍ | 14 | – | 16 | .467 | 32 | – | 22 | .593 |
| Miami (FL) ‍‍‍ | 11 | – | 19 | .367 | 26 | – | 30 | .464 |
| Pittsburgh ‍‍‍ | 10 | – | 20 | .333 | 26 | – | 28 | .481 |
x – Division champion ‡ – Tournament champion y – Invited to the NCAA Tournament; As of June 26, 2024; Rankings from D1Baseball

The 2024 Virginia Cavaliers baseball team represented the University of Virginia during the 2024 NCAA Division I baseball season. The Cavaliers played their home games at Davenport Field as a members of the Atlantic Coast Conference. They were led by head coach Brian O'Connor, in his 21st season at Virginia.

== Game log ==
2024 Virginia Cavaliers baseball game log
Regular season (40–14)

February (8–0)
| Date | TV | Opponent | Rank | Stadium | Score | Win | Loss | Save | Attendance | Overall | ACC |
|---|---|---|---|---|---|---|---|---|---|---|---|
| February 16 | ACCNX | Hofstra* | No. 14 | Davenport Field; Charlottesville, Virginia | W 10–8 | Barker (1–0) | Hart (0–1) | Teel (1) | 3,575 | 1–0 | — |
| February 17 | ACCNX | Hofstra* | No. 14 | Davenport Field | W 21–3 | Blanco (1–0) | Kaenzig (0–1) | None | 3,242 | 2–0 | — |
| February 18 | ACCNX | Hofstra* | No. 14 | Davenport Field | W 11–9 | Moore (1–0) | Henry (0–1) | Teel (2) | 3,423 | 3–0 | — |
| February 21 | ACCNX | Old Dominion* | No. 14 | Davenport Field | W 8–0 | Jaxel (1–0) | Gomez (0–1) | None | 2,891 | 4–0 | — |
| February 23 | WINA | vs. Wichita State* | No. 14 | 121 Financial Ballpark; Jacksonville, Florida | W 5–4^{10} | Teel (1–0) | Holmes (0–1) | None | 2,641 | 5–0 | — |
| February 24 | | vs. No. 18 Iowa* | No. 14 | 121 Financial Ballpark | W 12–9 | Osinski (1–0) | Hogue (0–1) | Barker (1) | 4,451 | 6–0 | — |
| February 25 | | vs. Auburn* | No. 14 | 121 Financial Ballpark | W 6–4 | Jaxel (2–0) | Herberholz (0–1) | Teel (3) | 4,117 | 7–0 | — |
| February 28 | ACCNX | VMI* | No. 13 | Davenport Field | W 16–4 | McKay (1–0) | Jones (0–2) | None | 2,711 | 8–0 | — |

March (14–6)
| Date | TV | Opponent | Rank | Stadium | Score | Win | Loss | Save | Attendance | Overall | ACC |
|---|---|---|---|---|---|---|---|---|---|---|---|
| March 1 | ACCNX | UMass* | No. 13 | Davenport Field | W 4–3^{10} | Teel (2–0) | Terwillig (0–1) | None | 2,891 | 9–0 | — |
| March 2 | ACCNX | UMass* | No. 13 | Davenport Field | L 5–10 | Belliveau (1–1) | J. O'Connor (0–1) | Given (1) | 3,256 | 9–1 | — |
| March 3 | ACCNX | UMass* | No. 13 | Davenport Field | W 10–6 | Woolfolk (1–0) | R. O'Connor (0–2) | None | 3,472 | 10–1 | — |
| March 5 | ACCNX | Penn State* | No. 13 | Davenport Field | W 6–3 | Hungate (1–0) | Butash (0–1) | Teel (4) | 3,173 | 11–1 | — |
| March 6 | ESPN+ | at George Washington* | No. 13 | Barcroft Park; Arlington, Virginia | W 26–12 | Osinski (2–0) | Korson (0–1) | None | 252 | 12–1 | — |
| March 8 | ACCNX | at Miami (FL) | No. 13 | Alex Rodriguez Park; Coral Gables, Florida | L 5–6 | Olivera (1–0) | Barker (1–1) | Robert (2) | 2,778 | 12–2 | 0–1 |
| March 9 | ACCNX | at Miami (FL) | No. 13 | Alex Rodriguez Park | L 12–16 | Caruso (1–0) | Teel (2–1) | None | 2,787 | 12–3 | 0–2 |
| March 10 | ACCNX | at Miami (FL) | No. 13 | Alex Rodriguez Park | W 14–11 | Augustin (1–0) | Walters (0–1) | O'Connor (1) | 3,086 | 13–3 | 1–2 |
| March 12 | ACCNX | William & Mary* | No. 17 | Davenport Field | W 6–2 | Osinski (3–0) | Hindy (3–2) | None | 3,209 | 14–3 | — |
| March 15 | ACCN | No. 7 Wake Forest | No. 17 | Davenport Field | W 16–10 | Kampschror (1–0) | Ray (0–2) | O'Connor (2) | 4,563 | 15–3 | 2–2 |
| March 16 | ACCNX | No. 7 Wake Forest | No. 17 | Davenport Field | L 3–9 | Burns (4–0) | Blanco (1–1) | None | 5,919 | 15–4 | 2–3 |
| March 17 | ACCNX | No. 7 Wake Forest | No. 17 | Davenport Field | W 11–10^{10} | Jaxel (3–0) | Falco (0–1) | None | 4,796 | 16–4 | 3–3 |
| March 19 | ACCNX | Georgetown* | No. 14 | Davenport Field | W 15–6 | Barker (2–1) | Leckszas (0–1) | None | 2,953 | 17–4 | — |
| March 22 | ACCNX | at Pitt | No. 14 | Charles Cost Field; Pittsburgh, Pennsylvania | W 18–2^{7} | McKay (2–0) | Andrade (0–1) | None | 353 | 18–4 | 4–3 |
| March 23 | ACCNX | at Pitt | No. 14 | Charles Cost Field | W 10–4 | Blanco (2–1) | Sokol (2–2) | Tonas (1) | 427 | 19–4 | 5–3 |
| March 24 | ACCNX | at Pitt | No. 14 | Charles Cost Field | W 8–2 | Jaxel (4–0) | Reed (0–3) | None | 439 | 20–4 | 6–3 |
| March 26 | ACCNX | Richmond* | No. 9 | Davenport Field | W 15–5 | Kampschror (2–0) | Wallon (0–1) | None | 3,211 | 21–4 | — |
| March 28 | ACCNX | at No. 11 Duke | No. 9 | Jack Coombs Field; Durham, North Carolina | L 4–9 | Santucci (5–0) | McKay (2–1) | None | 761 | 21–5 | 6–4 |
| March 29 | ACCNX | at No. 11 Duke | No. 9 | Jack Coombs Field | W 7–3 | Hungate (2–0) | Higgins (0–1) | None | 1,377 | 22–5 | 7–4 |
| March 30 | ACCNX | at No. 11 Duke | No. 9 | Jack Coombs Field | L 3–7 | Hart (1–0) | Woolfolk (1–1) | None | 1,453 | 22–6 | 7–5 |

April (12–6)
| Date | TV | Opponent | Rank | Stadium | Score | Win | Loss | Save | Attendance | Overall | ACC |
|---|---|---|---|---|---|---|---|---|---|---|---|
| April 2 | ACCNX | Old Dominion* | No. 15 | Davenport Field | W 4–0 | Coady (1–0) | Pond (0–2) | None | 3,151 | 23–6 | — |
| April 4 | ACCN | No. 10 North Carolina | No. 15 | Davenport Field | W 14–11 | Augustin (2–0) | Pence (2–1) | None | 3,734 | 24–6 | 8–5 |
| April 5 | ACCNX | No. 10 North Carolina | No. 15 | Davenport Field | W 7–2 | Blanco (3–1) | Decaro (1–1) | Coady (1) | 4,475 | 25–6 | 9–5 |
| April 6 | ACCNX | No. 10 North Carolina | No. 15 | Davenport Field | L 7–12 | Poston (2–0) | Teel (2–2) | None | 5,919 | 25–7 | 9–6 |
| April 9 | ACCNX | VCU* | No. 11 | Davenport Field | W 8–4 | Hungate (3–0) | Ellis (0–2) | None | 3,281 | 26–7 | — |
| April 10 | ACCNX | Towson* | No. 11 | Davenport Field | Canceled (inclement weather) | | | | | 26–7 | — |
| April 12 | ACCNX | at Louisville | No. 11 | Patterson Stadium; Louisville, Kentucky | W 21–3 | Blanco (4–1) | Gongora (4–3) | None | 2,754 | 27–7 | 10–6 |
| April 13 | ACCNX | at Louisville | No. 11 | Patterson Stadium | L 10–14 | Snyder (2–0) | Jaxel (4–1) | None | 3,012 | 27–8 | 10–7 |
| April 14 | ACCNX | at Louisville | No. 11 | Patterson Stadium | W 16–7 | Hungate (4–0) | Liggett (2–2) | None | 3,102 | 28–8 | 11–7 |
| April 16 | WINA | at Old Dominion* | No. 10 | Bud Metheny Field; Norfolk, Virginia | L 4–7 | Pond (1–2) | Savino (0–1) | None | 4,082 | 28–9 | — |
| April 17 | ACCNX | George Mason* | No. 10 | Davenport Field | W 11–5 | Tonas (1–0) | Rumber (1–4) | None | 3,196 | 29–9 | — |
| April 19 | ACCNX | Georgia Tech | No. 10 | Davenport Field | L 2–13 | Finateri (5–1) | Blanco (4–2) | None | 4,601 | 29–10 | 11–8 |
| April 20 | ACCNX | Georgia Tech | No. 10 | Davenport Field | W 8–7^{11} | Hungate (5–0) | Thomas (3–1) | None | 4,853 | 30–10 | 12–8 |
| April 21 | ACCNX | Georgia Tech | No. 10 | Davenport Field | L 12–17 | King (2–1) | Osinski (3–1) | None | 5,815 | 30–11 | 12–9 |
| April 23 | ACCNX | Liberty* | No. 14 | Davenport Field | W 14–4 | Osinski (4–1) | Swink (0–2) | None | 3,075 | 31–11 | — |
| April 25 | WINA | at Boston College | No. 14 | Fenway Park; Boston, Massachusetts | L 2–8 | Schroeder (4–1) | Blanco (4–3) | None | 1,750 | 31–12 | 12–10 |
| April 26 | WINA | at Boston College | No. 14 | Pellagrini Diamond; Chestnut Hill, Massachusetts | W 4–3 | Hungate (6–0) | Crowley (0–1) | None | 845 | 32–12 | 13–10 |
| April 27 | WINA | at Boston College | No. 14 | Pellagrini Diamond | W 4–0 | Tonas (2–0) | Moore (1–3) | None | 906 | 33–12 | 14–10 |
| April 30 | ESPN+ | at VCU* | No. 11 | The Diamond; Richmond, Virginia | W 8–4 | Moore (2–0) | Peters (2–4) | Teel (5) | 3,689 | 34–12 | — |

May (6–2)
| Date | TV | Opponent | Rank | Stadium | Score | Win | Loss | Save | Attendance | Overall | ACC |
|---|---|---|---|---|---|---|---|---|---|---|---|
| May 1 | ACCNX | Navy* | No. 11 | Davenport Field | W 10–0^{7} | Blanco (5–3) | Beisty (0–1) | None | 4,154 | 35–12 | — |
| May 8 | ACCNX | George Washington* | No. 10 | Davenport Field | W 18–5^{7} | Woolfolk (2–1) | Jeffries (4–3) | None | 3,214 | 36–12 | — |
| May 10 | ACCN | No. 23 NC State | No. 10 | Davenport Field | L 5–7 | Highfill (5–1) | Hungate (6–1) | Dudan (5) | 4,131 | 36–13 | 14–11 |
| May 11 | ACCNX | No. 23 NC State | No. 10 | Davenport Field | W 9–5 | Savino (1–1) | Fritton (3–5) | Teel (6) | 4,638 | 37–13 | 15–11 |
| May 12 | ACCNX | No. 23 NC State | No. 10 | Davenport Field | L 5–13 | Consiglio (3–4) | Coady (1–1) | None | 4,514 | 37–14 | 15–12 |
| May 16 | ACCNX | Virginia Tech | No. 18 | Davenport Field | W 7–3 | Blanco (6–3) | Renfrow (6–3) | None | 4,275 | 38–14 | 16–12 |
| May 17 | ACCNX | Virginia Tech | No. 18 | Davenport Field | W 13–3^{7} | Savino (2–1) | Shoemaker (3–3) | None | 4,610 | 39–14 | 17–12 |
| May 18 | ACCN | Virginia Tech | No. 18 | Davenport Field | W 10–9^{13} | Hungate (7–1) | Shoemaker (3–4) | None | 5,084 | 40–14 | 18–12 |

Postseason (6–1)

ACC tournament (1–1)
| Date | TV | Opponent | Seed/Rank | Stadium | Score | Win | Loss | Save | Attendance | Overall | ACCT Record |
|---|---|---|---|---|---|---|---|---|---|---|---|
| May 22 | ACCN | (9) Georgia Tech | (4) No. 16 | Truist Field; Charlotte, North Carolina | W 13–0^{7} | Blanco (7–3) | Finateri (5–4) | None | 2,919 | 41–14 | 1–0 |
| May 24 | ACCN | (5) No. 10 Florida State | (4) No. 16 | Truist Field | L 7–12 | Arnold (10–3) | Savino (2–2) | Oxford (5) | 4,305 | 41–15 | 1–1 |

NCAA tournament Charlottesville Regional (3–0)
| Date | TV | Opponent | Seed/Rank | Stadium | Score | Win | Loss | Save | Attendance | Overall | Regional Record |
|---|---|---|---|---|---|---|---|---|---|---|---|
| May 31 | ESPN+ | (4) Pennsylvania | (1) No. 12 | Davenport Field | W 4–2 | Savino (3–2) | Zaffiro (5–5) | Hungate (1) | 5,802 | 42–15 | 1–0 |
| June 1 | ACCN | (2) No. 17 Mississippi State | (1) No. 12 | Davenport Field | W 5–4 | Tonas (3–0) | Hardin (3–3) | None | 5,919 | 43–15 | 2–0 |
| June 2 | ACCN | (2) No. 17 Mississippi State | (1) No. 12 | Davenport Field | W 9–2 | Woolfolk (3–1) | Kohn (1–1) | None | 5,919 | 44–15 | 3–0 |

NCAA tournament Charlottesville Super Regional (2–0)
| Date | TV | Opponent | Seed/Rank | Stadium | Score | Win | Loss | Save | Attendance | Overall | Super Regional Record |
|---|---|---|---|---|---|---|---|---|---|---|---|
| June 7 | ESPN2 | Kansas State | No. 12 | Davenport Field | W 7–4 | Blanco (8–3) | Dean (4–4) | Augustin (1) | 5,919 | 45–15 | 1–0 |
| June 8 | ESPNU | Kansas State | No. 12 | Davenport Field | W 10–4 | Woolfolk (4–1) | Wentworth (5–6) | Hungate (2) | 5,919 | 46–15 | 2–0 |

College World Series (0–2)
| Date | TV | Opponent | Seed/Rank | Stadium | Score | Win | Loss | Save | Attendance | Overall | CWS Record |
|---|---|---|---|---|---|---|---|---|---|---|---|
| June 14 | ESPN | No. 4 North Carolina | No. 12 | Charles Schwab Field; Omaha, NE | L 2–3 | Pence (5–1) | Hungate (7–2) | None | 23,990 | 46–16 | 0–1 |
| June 16 | ESPN | vs. No. 8 Florida State | No. 12 | Charles Schwab Field; Omaha, NE | L 3-7 | Dorsey (8-4) | Woolfolk (4-2) | None | 23,989 | 46–17 | 0–2 |

Legend: = Win = Loss = Canceled
Bold =Virginia team member
Rankings are based on the team's current ranking in the D1Baseball poll or NCAA tournament seeding for postseason play.

== Rankings ==
Ranking movements Legend: ██ Increase in ranking ██ Decrease in ranking
| | Week | | | | | | | | | | | | | | | | | | | |
| Poll | Pre | 1 | 2 | 3 | 4 | 5 | 6 | 7 | 8 | 9 | 10 | 11 | 12 | 13 | 14 | 15 | 16 | 17 | 18 | Final |
|---|---|---|---|---|---|---|---|---|---|---|---|---|---|---|---|---|---|---|---|---|
| Coaches' | 11 | 11* | 9 | 12 | 15 | 11 | 8 | 11 | 10 | 8 | 12 | 10 | 10 | 14 | 12 | 13 | | | | |
| Baseball America | 10 | 10 | 8 | 8 | 15 | 13 | 8 | 12 | 9 | 9 | 11 | 10 | 10 | 14 | 13 | 14 | | | | |
| NCBWA† | 11 | 11 | 10 | 11 | 16 | 12 | 6 | 11 | 9 | 10 | 12 | 10 | 8 | 12 | 10 | 11 | | | | |
| D1Baseball | 14 | 14 | 13 | 13 | 17 | 14 | 9 | 15 | 11 | 10 | 14 | 11 | 10 | 18 | 16 | 18 | | | | |
| Perfect Game | 10 | 10 | 9 | 10 | 17 | 15 | 10 | 13 | 10 | 9 | 13 | 9 | 10 | 15 | 12 | 12* | | | | |

† NCBWA ranks 30 teams in their preseason poll, but only ranks 25 teams weekly during the season.
* A new poll was not released for this week, so for comparison purposes, the previous week's ranking is inserted in this week's slot.
