= 2024 Missouri Tigers baseball team =

Season of a college baseball team

2024 Missouri Tigers baseball
- Conference: Southeastern Conference
- Eastern Division
- Record: 23–32 (9–21 SEC)
- Head coach: Kerrick Jackson (1st season)
- Assistant coaches: Tim Jamieson (pitching); Bryson LeBlanc; Jabari Brown
- Home stadium: Taylor Stadium

2024 Southeastern Conference baseball standings
	Conf.				Overall
Team	W		L	PCT	W		L	PCT
Eastern
No. 1 Tennessee ^{x}‍†‍‡‍^{y}	22	–	8	.733	60	–	13	.822
No. 3 Kentucky ^{x}‍†‍‍^{y}	22	–	8	.733	46	–	16	.742
No. 11 Georgia ‍‍‍^{y}	17	–	13	.567	43	–	17	.717
Vanderbilt ‍‍‍^{y}	13	–	17	.433	38	–	23	.623
No. 8 Florida ‍‍‍^{y}	13	–	17	.433	36	–	30	.545
South Carolina ‍‍‍^{y}	13	–	17	.433	37	–	25	.597
Missouri ‍‍‍	9	–	21	.300	23	–	32	.418
Western
No. 17 Arkansas ^{x}‍‍‍^{y}	20	–	10	.667	44	–	16	.733
No. 2 Texas A&M ‍‍‍^{y}	19	–	11	.633	53	–	15	.779
No. 22 Mississippi State ‍‍‍^{y}	17	–	13	.567	40	–	23	.635
Alabama ‍‍‍^{y}	13	–	17	.433	33	–	24	.579
LSU ‍‍‍^{y}	13	–	17	.433	43	–	23	.652
Ole Miss ‍‍‍	11	–	19	.367	27	–	29	.482
Auburn ‍‍‍	8	–	22	.267	27	–	26	.509
x – Division champion † – Conference champion ‡ – Tournament champion y – Invited to the NCAA Tournament; As of June 24, 2024; Rankings from D1Baseball

The 2024 Missouri Tigers baseball team represented the University of Missouri in the 2024 NCAA Division I baseball season. The Tigers played their home games at Taylor Stadium.

== Previous season ==
The Tigers finished the season 30–24 overall and 10–20 in conference play. They finished seventh in the Eastern division in the SEC and qualified for the SEC tournament but did not qualify for the NCAA tournament. After Steve Bieser was fired following the season, Kerrick Jackson was named Mizzou's 15th head coach on June 3, 2023.

=== 2023 MLB draft ===
The Tigers had 4 players drafted in the 2023 MLB draft.

Player	Position	Round	Overall	MLB Team
Austin Troesser	Pitcher	4	135	New York Mets
Zach Franklin	Pitcher	10	299	Chicago White Sox
Chandler Murphy	Pitcher	12	363	Tampa Bay Rays
Luke Mann	3rd base	14	406	Oakland Athletics

== Departures ==
Offseason departures
Name	Number	Pos.	Height	Weight	Year	Hometown	Notes
Dylan Leach	2	INF	5’10”	180 lbs	Junior	St. Louis, MO	Transferred to Missouri State
Tre Morris	3	Catcher	5’10”	204 lbs	RS-Senior	Columbia, MO	Graduated
Cam Chick	6	INF/OF	5’9”	179 lbs	RS-Senior	Columbia, MO	Graduated
Ross Lovich	7	OF	6’0”	186 lbs	Junior	Overland Park, KS	Transferred to Arkansas
Ty Wilmsmeyer	9	OF	6’1”	180 lbs	Senior	Springfield, MO	Transferred to Arkansas
Rorik Maltrud	13	RHP	6’4”	223 lbs	RS-Senior	Austin, TX	Graduated; signed to play for the Cleveland Guardians
Jacob Hasty	26	LHP	6’2”	230 lbs	Senior	Keller, TX	Transferred to LSU
Carlos Peña	27	OF	6’2”	228 lbs	Sophomore	Bayside, NY	Transferred to Indiana State
Parker Wright	36	RHP	6’3”	208 lbs	Junior	Columbia, MO	
Hank Zeisler	40	INF	5’10”	218 lbs	RS-Senior	Kentfield, CA	Graduated; signed to play for the Florence Y'alls
Aiden Heberlie	45	OF	6’3”	203 lbs	Freshman	Ste. Genevieve, MO	Transferred to St. Charles CC
Kyle Potthoff	47	RHP	6’5”	218 lbs	RS-Senior	Chesterfield, MO	Transferred to Northwestern
Dalton Bargo	50	Catcher	6’1”	199 lbs	Freshman	Chesterfield, MO	Transferred to Tennessee
Jack Mosh	51	INF	5’10”	199 lbs	Freshman	Kansas City, MO	Transferred to Johnson County CC
Cam Careswell	52	INF	6’2”	229 lbs	Sophomore	Lee's Summit, MO	

== Transfer in ==
Offseason Transfers In
Name	Number	Pos.	Height	Weight	Year	Hometown	Notes
Danny Corona	3	INF	6’0”	215 lbs	Junior	Carthage, TX	Transferred from Wake Forest
Jeric Curtis	6	OF	6’0”	170 lbs	Sophomore	Cypress, TX	Transferred from Texas Tech
Jacob Peaden	13	RHP	6’2”	200 lbs	Graduate Student	Greenville, NC	Transferred from Davidson
Kadden Drew	22	LHP	6’2”	210 lbs	Junior	Scottsdale, AZ	Transferred from Paradise Valley CC
Jedier Hernandez	24	Catcher	6’0”	200 lbs	Junior	Trenton, NJ	Transferred from Seton Hall
Ryan Magdic	26	LHP	6’5”	240 lbs	Junior	Beamsville, ON	Transferred from Florida Southern
RJ Jimerson	28	OF	5’10”	185 lbs	Sophomore	Chicago, IL	Transferred from Memphis
Cameron Benson	29	INF/OF	6’3”	185 lbs	Junior	Farmington Hills, MI	Transferred from Memphis
Kaden Jacobi	32	RHP	6’3”	220 lbs	Junior	O'Fallon, MO	Transferred from St. Charles CC
Victor Quinn	40	RHP	6’1”	217 lbs	Junior	O'Fallon, MO	Transferred from Oregon State
Xavier Lovett	44	RHP	6’0”	190 lbs	Junior	Houston, TX	Transferred from Memphis
Seth McCartney	53	RHP	6’0”	200 lbs	Junior	Brandon, MS	Transferred from Meridian CC
Miles Garrett	58	RHP	5’10”	175 lbs	Junior	Stone Mountain, GA	Transferred from Vanderbilt

== Incoming Recruits ==
Missouri Recruits
Name	B/T	Pos.	Height	Weight	Hometown	High School	Source
Drew Culbertson	R/R	SS/3B	5’11”	180 lbs	Greenwood, IN	Center Grove High School	
Jack Holubowski	R/R	3B/RHP/OF	6’2”	180 lbs	Chesterfield, MO	Marquette High School	
Thomas Curry	R/R	C/3B	6’1”	210 lbs	Hartland, WI	Arrowhead High School	
Kaden Peer	L/R	SS/OF	5’11”	150 lbs	Dardenne Prairie, MO	Christian Brothers College High School	
Tyler Macon	R/R	SS/2B	5’11”	170 lbs	Des Peres, MO	Kirkwood High School	
Charlie Miller	R/R	RHP/3B, SS	6’3”	185 lbs	Lohman, MO	Russellville High School	
Wil Libbert	L/L	LHP/1B	6’1”	195 lbs	Meta, MO	Blair Oaks High School	
Ben Smith	R/R	RHP/3B	6’1”	185 lbs	Springfield, MO	Springfield Catholic High School	
Josh McDevitt	R/R	RHP	6’2”	195 lbs	Effingham, IL	Effingham High School	
Mateo Serna	S/R	C/1B	6’0”	195 lbs	Doral, FL	American Heritage School	

== Personnel ==
=== Roster ===
2024 Missouri Tigers baseball team
Players
Coaches

#	Pos.	Name	B/T	Height	Weight	Year	Home town
1	OF	Juju Stevens	R/R	6 ft 0 in (1.83 m)	180 lb (82 kg)	Jr	Woodbridge, CT
3	INF	Danny Corona	L/R	6 ft 3 in (1.91 m)	215 lb (98 kg)	Jr	Brooklyn, NY
4	INF	Matt Garcia	S/R	6 ft 0 in (1.83 m)	190 lb (86 kg)	Gr	Orlando, FL
5	UTL	Brock Daniels	L/R	6 ft 1 in (1.85 m)	195 lb (88 kg)	So	St. Louis, MO
6	OF	Jeric Curtis	R/R	6 ft 0 in (1.83 m)	170 lb (77 kg)	So	Cypress, TX
7	INF	Drew Culbertson	R/R	6 ft 0 in (1.83 m)	180 lb (82 kg)	Fr	Greenwood, IN
8	C	Tucker Moore	S/R	6 ft 1 in (1.85 m)	198 lb (90 kg)	RS Fr	Castle Rock, CO
10	OF	Jackson Beaman	R/R	6 ft 1 in (1.85 m)	230 lb (104 kg)	Sr	Lincoln, MO
11	INF	Jack Holubowski	R/R	6 ft 2 in (1.88 m)	205 lb (93 kg)	Fr	Chesterfield, MO
12	INF	Justin Colon	R/R	6 ft 3 in (1.91 m)	160 lb (73 kg)	Jr	Carolina, PR
13	RHP	Jacob Peaden	R/R	6 ft 2 in (1.88 m)	200 lb (91 kg)	Gr	Greenville, NC
14	OF	Isaiah Frost	L/L	5 ft 11 in (1.8 m)	197 lb (89 kg)	Jr	Lee's Summit, MO
17	C	Thomas Curry	R/R	5 ft 11 in (1.8 m)	230 lb (104 kg)	Fr	Hartland, WI
18	INF	Jackson Lovich	R/R	6 ft 4 in (1.93 m)	192 lb (87 kg)	So	Overland Park, KS
19	UTL	Trevor Austin	R/R	5 ft 10 in (1.78 m)	188 lb (85 kg)	Sr	Jefferson City, MO
20	UTL	Kaden Peer	L/R	6 ft 2 in (1.88 m)	185 lb (84 kg)	Fr	Chesterfield, MO
21	RHP	Sam Horn	R/R	6 ft 4 in (1.93 m)	217 lb (98 kg)	So	Lawrenceville, GA
22	LHP	Kadden Drew	R/L	6 ft 2 in (1.88 m)	210 lb (95 kg)	Jr	Scottsdale, AZ
23	P	Ian Lohse	L/L	6 ft 0 in (1.83 m)	199 lb (90 kg)	Sr	St. Louis, MO
24	C	Jedier Hernandez	R/R	6 ft 0 in (1.83 m)	200 lb (91 kg)	Jr	Trenton, NJ
25	RHP	Brock Lucas	R/R	6 ft 3 in (1.91 m)	229 lb (104 kg)	So	St. Elizabeth, MO
26	LHP	Ryan Magdic	L/L	6 ft 5 in (1.96 m)	240 lb (109 kg)	Gr	Beamsville, ON
27	INF	Tyler Macon	R/R	5 ft 11 in (1.8 m)	175 lb (79 kg)	Fr	Kirkwood, MO
28	OF	RJ Jimerson	R/R	5 ft 10 in (1.78 m)	185 lb (84 kg)	So	Chicago, IL
29	UTL	Cameron Benson	L/R	6 ft 3 in (1.91 m)	185 lb (84 kg)	Jr	Farmington Hills, MI
30	RHP	Carter Rustad	R/R	6 ft 4 in (1.93 m)	194 lb (88 kg)		Kansas City, MO
32	RHP	Kaden Jacobi	R/R	6 ft 3 in (1.91 m)	220 lb (100 kg)	Jr	O'Fallon, MO
35	LHP	Daniel Wissler	L/L	6 ft 2 in (1.88 m)	185 lb (84 kg)	So	O'Fallon, MO
38	RHP	Bryce Mayer	R/R	6 ft 3 in (1.91 m)	210 lb (95 kg)	Jr	Marthasville, MO
39	RHP	Charlie Miller	R/R	6 ft 3 in (1.91 m)	185 lb (84 kg)	Fr	Lohman, MO
40	RHP	Victor Quinn	R/R	6 ft 1 in (1.85 m)	217 lb (98 kg)	Jr	O'Fallon, MO
41	LHP	Nic Smith	L/L	6 ft 3 in (1.91 m)	198 lb (90 kg)	So	Jamestown, TN
42	LHP	Wil Libbert	L/L	6 ft 1 in (1.85 m)	205 lb (93 kg)	Fr	St. Thomas, MO
43	LHP	Javyn Pimental	L/L	6 ft 3 in (1.91 m)	213 lb (97 kg)	Jr	Kaneohe, HI
44	RHP	Xavier Lovett	R/R	6 ft 0 in (1.83 m)	190 lb (86 kg)	Jr	Houston, TX
47	RHP	Ben Pedersen	R/R	6 ft 6 in (1.98 m)	210 lb (95 kg)	Gr	Duluth, MN
48	RHP	Logan Lunceford	R/R	6 ft 0 in (1.83 m)	180 lb (82 kg)	So	Edmond, OK
49	LHP	Tony Neubeck	L/L	6 ft 2 in (1.88 m)	237 lb (108 kg)	Jr	Hugo, MN
50	RHP	Ben Smith	R/R	6 ft 2 in (1.88 m)	195 lb (88 kg)	Fr	Springfield, MO
53	RHP	Seth McCartney	R/R	6 ft 0 in (1.83 m)	200 lb (91 kg)	Jr	Brandon, MS
54	RHP	Josh McDevitt	R/R	6 ft 2 in (1.88 m)	195 lb (88 kg)	Fr	Effingham, IL
58	RHP	Miles Garrett	R/R	5 ft 10 in (1.78 m)	175 lb (79 kg)	Jr	Stone Mountain, GA
88	C	Mateo Serna	S/R	6 ft 0 in (1.83 m)	195 lb (88 kg)	Fr	Doral, FL

Head coach

Kerrick Jackson

Assistant coach(es)

Tim Jamieson
Bryson LeBlanc
Jabari Brown

Legend

- (C) Team captain
- (S) Suspended
- (I) Ineligible
- Injured
- Current redshirt

Roster
Last update: March 31, 2024

=== Coaching staff ===
2024 Missouri Tigers coaching staff
Name	Position
Kerrick Jackson	Head coach
Tim Jamieson	Pitching Coach
Bryson LeBlanc	Hitting Coach
Jabari Brown	Volunteer Assistant Coach
Anthony Hansen	Graduate Assistant

== Schedule and results ==
2024 Missouri Tigers baseball game log
Regular season (23–32)

February (4–4)
Date	Opponent	Rank	Site/stadium	Score	Win	Loss	Save	TV	Attendance	Overall record	SEC record
Feb. 16	at Cal Poly*		Baggett Stadium; San Luis Obispo, CA	**L** 2–3	Wright (1–0)	**Mayer** (0–1)	None			0–1	–
Feb. 16	at Cal Poly*		Baggett Stadium	**W** 3–1	**Rustad** (1–0)	Brooks (0–1)	**Peaden** (1)		1,825	1–1	–
Feb. 17	at Cal Poly*		Baggett Stadium	**W** 12–8	**Wissler** (1–0)	Baum (0–1)	**Lucas** (1)		1,139	2–1	–
Tony Gwynn Legacy
Feb. 22	vs. CSU Bakersfield*		Tony Gwynn Stadium; San Diego, CA	**W** 6–3	**Lucas** (1–0)	Verdugo (0–1)	**Peaden (2)**			3–1	–
Feb. 23	vs. San Diego State*		Tony Gwynn Stadium	**L** 3–10	Riordan (1–0)	**Mayer** (0–2)	None		1,127	3–2	–
Feb. 24	vs. UC San Diego*		Tony Gwynn Stadium	**L** 4–8	Eyanson (1–0)	**Rustad** (1–1)	None			3–3	–
Feb. 24	vs. UC San Diego*		Tony Gwynn Stadium	**W** 5–4^{11}	**Peaden** (1–0)	Custer (0–1)	None		466	4–3	–
Feb. 27	Southeast Missouri State*		Taylor Stadium; Columbia, MO	**L** 3–8^{8}	Heyman (1–0)	**Wissler** (1–1)	None		1,522	4–4	–

March (6–14)
Date	Opponent	Rank	Site/stadium	Score	Win	Loss	Save	TV	Attendance	Overall record	SEC record
Mar. 1	Northern Kentucky*		Taylor Stadium	**L** 1–3	Gillis (1–1)	**Mayer** (0–3)	McClanahan (1)		1,124	4–5	–
Mar. 2	Northern Kentucky*		Taylor Stadium	**W** 28–10^{7}	**Rustad** (2–1)	Brock (0–2)	None		1,450	5–5	–
Mar. 3	Northern Kentucky*		Taylor Stadium	**L** 15–16	Massie (1–2)	**Peaden** (1–1)	None		1,351	5–6	–
Mar. 5	Lindenwood*		Taylor Stadium	**W** 5–4	**Wissler** (2–1)	Walsh (0–2)	**Peaden** (3)		926	6–6	–
Mar. 8	Purdue Fort Wayne*		Taylor Stadium	**L** 7–9	Fee (2–0)	**Lohse** (0–1)	None		931	6–7	–
Mar. 9	Purdue Fort Wayne*		Taylor Stadium	**L** 7–9	Caudill (2–1)	**Smith** (0–1)	Fee (2)			6–8	–
Mar. 9	Purdue Fort Wayne*		Taylor Stadium	**W** 11–1^{8}	**Rustad** (3–1)	Kuhns (0–3)	None		1,056	7–8	–
Mar. 10	Purdue Fort Wayne*		Taylor Stadium	**W** 20–2	**Lunceford** (1–0)	Fine (0–3)	None		1,313	8–8	–
Mar. 12	at Kansas*		Hoglund Ballpark; Lawrence, KS	**W** 5–4^{10}	**Lucas** (2–0)	Cain (0–1)	**Pedersen** (1)		1,512	9–8	–
Mar. 15	at No. 1 Arkansas		Baum–Walker Stadium; Fayetteville, AR	**L** 0–8	Smith (3–0)	**Lunceford** (1–1)	None	SECN+	10,109	9–9	0–1
Mar. 16	at No. 1 Arkansas		Baum–Walker Stadium	**L** 0–6	McEntire (2–0)	**Mayer** (0–4)	None	SECN+	10,434	9–10	0–2
Mar. 17	at No. 1 Arkansas		Baum–Walker Stadium	**L** 1–9	Molina (3–0)	**Rustad** (3–2)	None	SECN+	9,867	9–11	0–3
Mar. 19	vs. Kansas*		Kauffman Stadium; Kansas City, MO	**L** 3–4^{10}	Cranton (2–0)	**Magdic** (0–1)	None			9–12	–
Mar. 22	No. 21 Kentucky		Taylor Stadium	**L** 4–9^{11}	Hummel (2–0)	**Rustad** (3–3)	None	SECN+	1,011	9–13	0–4
Mar. 23	No. 21 Kentucky		Taylor Stadium	**W** 2–1	**Pimental** (1–0)	Niman (4–2)	**Mayer** (1)	SECN+	1,250	10–13	1–4
Mar. 24	No. 21 Kentucky		Taylor Stadium	**L** 6–7	Moore (5–0)	**Lohse** (0–2)	McCoy (1)	SECN+	977	10–14	1–5
Mar. 26	at Illinois*		Grizzlies Ballpark; Sauget, IL	**L** 3–11	Bunselmeyer (2–0)	**McDevitt** (0–1)			2,355	10–15	–
Mar. 28	at No. 9 Vanderbilt		Hawkins Field; Nashville, TN	**L** 1–3	Carter (3–0)	**Rustad** (3–4)	Ginther (4)		3,802	10–16	1–6
Mar. 29	at No. 9 Vanderbilt		Hawkins Field	**L** 0–4	Cunningham (4–1)	**Lunceford** (1–2)			3,802	10–17	1–7
Mar. 30	at No. 9 Vanderbilt		Hawkins Field	**L** 1–3	Holton (4–0)	**Pimental** (1–1)	Green (2)		3,802	10–18	1–8

April (10–8)
Date	Opponent	Rank	Site/stadium	Score	Win	Loss	Save	TV	Attendance	Overall record	SEC record
Apr. 2	UT Martin*		Taylor Stadium	**W** 13–3^{8}	**Lucas** (3–0)	Diffey (2–3)	None	SECN+	942	11–18	–
Apr. 3	UT Martin*		Taylor Stadium	**W** 15–9	**Mayer** (1–4)	Arender (0–1)	None	SECN+	869	12–18	–
Apr. 5	No. 4 Florida		Taylor Stadium	**W** 2–1^{11}	**Rustad** (4–4)	McNeillie (3–4)	None	SECN+	1,749	13–18	2–8
Apr. 6	No. 4 Florida		Taylor Stadium	**W** 4–3	**Lucas** (4–0)	Peterson (1–4)	**Magdic** (1)	SECN+	2,209	14–18	3–8
Apr. 7	No. 4 Florida		Taylor Stadium	**W** 11–10	**Peaden** (2–1)	McNeillie (3–5)	None	SECN+	1,449	15–18	4–8
Apr. 9	SIUE*		Taylor Stadium	**L** 4–5	Benner (2–0)	**Quinn**	Rodriguez (1)	SECN+	1,041	15–19	–
Apr. 11	at Georgia		Foley Field; Athens, GA	**L** 10–15	Evans (3–1)	**Rustad** (4–5)	None	SECN+	3,171	15–20	4–9
Apr. 12	at Georgia		Foley Field	**W** 6–5^{10}	**Magdic** (1–1)	Zeldin (3–1)	None	SECN+	3,760	16–20	5–9
Apr. 13	at Georgia		Foley Field	**L** 7–10	Smith (4–2)	**Pimental** (1–2)	None	SECN+	3,521	16–21	5–10
Apr. 16	at Missouri State*		Hammons Field; Springfield, MO	**W** 6–2	**Peaden** (3–1)	Loomis (1–2)	**Lohse** (1)	ESPN+	2,541	17–21	–
Apr. 19	LSU		Taylor Stadium	**L** 1–12^{7}	Jump (3–1)	**Lunceford** (1–3)		SECN	1,862	17–22	5–11
Apr. 20	LSU		Taylor Stadium	**W** 8–7	**Pimental** (2–2)	Holman (6–3)	**Magdic** (2)	SECN+	2,163	18–22	6–11
Apr. 21	LSU		Taylor Stadium	**L** 2–6	Herring (3–0)	**Mayer** (1–5)		SECN+	2,587	18–23	6–12
Apr. 23	Missouri State*		Taylor Stadium	**W** 10–6	**Wissler** (3–1)	Syverson (0–2)		SECN+	1,156	19–23	–
Apr. 25	at No. 3 Tennessee		Lindsey Nelson Stadium; Knoxville, TN	**L** 1–10	Causey (7–3)	**Magdic** (1–2)		SECN	5,529	19–24	6–13
Apr. 26	at No. 3 Tennessee		Lindsey Nelson Stadium	**L** 2–3	Beam (6–1)	**Lunceford** (1–4)	Combs (2)	SECN+	5,504	19–25	6–14
Apr. 27	at No. 3 Tennessee		Lindsey Nelson Stadium	**L** 2–3	Snead (7–1)	**Rustad** (4–6)	Connell (3)	SECN	6,026	19–26	6–15
Apr. 30	Lindenwood*		Taylor Stadium	**W** 13–1^{7}	**Jacobi** (1–0)	Darin (0–3)		SECN	1,278	20–26	–

May (3–6)
Date	Opponent	Rank	Site/stadium	Score	Win	Loss	Save	TV	Attendance	Overall record	SEC record
May 3	No. 14 South Carolina		Taylor Stadium	**L** 2–10	Good (5–1)	**Lunceford** (1–5)		SECN+	1,302	20–27	6–16
May 4	No. 14 South Carolina		Taylor Stadium	**W** 3–8	**Rustad** (5–6)	Jones (3–3)		SECN+	1,738	21–27	7–16
May 5	No. 14 South Carolina		Taylor Stadium	**L** 4–9	McCreery (3–0)	**Mayer** (1–6)	Veach (3)	SECN+	1,395	21–28	7–17
May 10	Auburn		Taylor Stadium	**W** 12–11	**Mayer** (2–6)	Carlson (3–2)		SECN+	1,446	22–28	8–17
May 11	Auburn		Taylor Stadium	**L** 2–12^{7}	Allsup (3–3)	**Lohse** (0–3)	Myers (1)	SECN+	1,635	22–29	8–18
May 12	Auburn		Taylor Stadium	**L** 7–9	Herberholz (2–2)	**Magdic** (1–3)		SECN+	1,395	22–30	8–19
May 16	at No. 18 Mississippi State		Dudy Noble Field; Starkville, MS	**L** 3–4	Stephen (8–3)	**Lohse** (0–4)	Davis (4)	SECN+	10,440	22–31	8–20
May 17	at No. 18 Mississippi State		Dudy Noble Field	**L** 2–8	Cijntje (8–1)	**Mayer** (2–7)		SECN+	10,522	22–32	8–21
May 18	at No. 18 Mississippi State		Dudy Noble Field	**W** 4–3	**Lunceford** (2–5)	Hardin (3–2)	**Lucas** (2)	SECN+	11,551	23–32	9–21

Legend: = Win = Loss = Canceled
Bold = Missouri team member
Rankings are based on the team's current ranking in the D1Baseball poll.

== Record vs. conference opponents ==
Last two did not qualify for conference tournament. Blank are not scheduled. Blue are home games, otherwise away.

2024 SEC baseball records Source: 2024 SEC baseball game results, 2024 SEC baseball schedule
Team	W–L	ALA	ARK	AUB	FLA	UGA	KEN	LSU	MSU	MIZZ	MISS	SCAR	TENN	TAMU	VAN	Team	Div	SR	SW
ALA	13–17		2–1	1–2	.	0–3	0–3	2–1	1–2	.	2–1	2–1	2–1	1–2	.	ALA	W4	5–5	0–2
ARK	20–10	1–2		2–1	2–1	.	1–2	3–0	2–1	3–0	3–0	2–1	.	1–2	.	ARK	W1	7–3	3–0
AUB	8–22	2–1	1–2		.	.	0–3	1–2	0–3	2–1	1–2	.	1–2	0–3	0–3	AUB	W7	2–8	0–4
FLA	13–17	.	1–2	.		2–1	1–2	2–1	2–1	0–3	.	1–2	1–2	2–1	1–2	FLA	E5	4–6	0–1
UGA	17–13	3–0	.	.	1–2		0–3	.	1–2	2–1	2–1	3–0	1–2	1–2	3–0	UGA	E3	5–5	3–1
KEN	22–8	3–0	2–1	3–0	2–1	3–0		.	.	2–1	3–0	1–2	1–2	.	2–1	KEN	E2	8–2	4–0
LSU	13–17	1–2	0–3	2–1	1–2	.	.		1–2	2–1	3–0	.	0–3	2–1	1–2	LSU	W5	4–6	1–2
MSU	17–13	2–1	1–2	3–0	1–2	2–1	.	2–1		2–1	1–2	.		1–2	2–1	MSU	W3	6–4	1–0
MIZZ	9–21	.	0–3	1–2	3–0	1–2	1–2	1–2	1–2		.	1–2	0–3	.	0–3	MIZZ	E7	1–9	1–3
MISS	11–19	1–2	0–3	2–1	.	1–2	0–3	0–3	2–1	.		2–1	1–2	2–1	.	MISS	W6	4–6	0–3
SCAR	13–17	1–2	1–2	.	2–1	0–3	2–1	.	.	2–1	1–2		0–3	1–2	3–0	SCAR	E6	4–6	1–2
TENN	22–8	1–2	.	2–1	2–1	2–1	2–1	3–0	.	3–0	2–1	3–0		.	2–1	TENN	E1	9–1	3–0
TAMU	19–11	2–1	2–1	3–0	1–2	2–1	.	1–2	2–1	.	1–2	2–1	.		3–0	TAMU	W2	7–3	2–0
VAN	13–17	.	.	3–0	2–1	0–3	1–2	2–1	1–2	3–0	.	0–3	1–2	0–3		VAN	E4	4–6	2–3
Team	W–L	ALA	ARK	AUB	FLA	UGA	KEN	LSU	MSU	MIZZ	MISS	SCAR	TENN	TAMU	VAN	Team	Div	SR	SW

Updated for entire regular season. Tiebreakers: Tennessee over Kentucky (using head-to-head result). Mississippi State over Georgia (using head-to-head result). Alabama over Vanderbilt and Florida over South Carolina and LSU (comparing results against Tennessee). Vanderbilt over Florida (using head-to-head result). South Carolina over LSU (using Arkansas as common opponent). Arkansas received a higher seed than Kentucky in the SEC Tournament on the basis of being West Division champions.

== Rankings ==
Ranking movements Legend: — = Not ranked
	Week																			
Poll	Pre	1	2	3	4	5	6	7	8	9	10	11	12	13	14	15	16	17	18	Final
Coaches'	—	—*	—	—	—	—	—	—	—	—										
Baseball America	—	—	—	—	—	—	—	—	—	—										
Collegiate Baseball^	—	—	—	—	—	—	—	—	—	—										
NCBWA†	—	—	—	—	—	—	—	—	—	—										
D1Baseball	—	—	—	—	—	—	—	—	—	—										

^ Collegiate Baseball ranked 40 teams in their preseason poll, but only ranked 30 teams weekly during the season.
† NCBWA ranks 30 teams in their preseason poll, but only ranks 25 teams weekly during the season.
* A new poll was not released for this week, so for comparison purposes, the previous week's ranking is inserted in this week's slot.
