= 2024 LSU Tigers baseball team =

2024 season of Louisiana State University baseball team

2024 LSU Tigers baseball

Astros Foundation Classic champions

Chapel Hill Regional, 3–2
- Conference: Southeastern Conference
- Western Division
- Record: 43–23 (13–17 SEC)
- Head coach: Jay Johnson (3rd season)
- Assistant coaches: Nate Yeskie; Josh Jordan; Marc Wanaka
- Home stadium: Alex Box Stadium

2024 Southeastern Conference baseball standings
	Conf.				Overall
Team	W		L	PCT	W		L	PCT
Eastern
No. 1 Tennessee ^{x}‍†‍‡‍^{y}	22	–	8	.733	60	–	13	.822
No. 3 Kentucky ^{x}‍†‍‍^{y}	22	–	8	.733	46	–	16	.742
No. 11 Georgia ‍‍‍^{y}	17	–	13	.567	43	–	17	.717
Vanderbilt ‍‍‍^{y}	13	–	17	.433	38	–	23	.623
No. 8 Florida ‍‍‍^{y}	13	–	17	.433	36	–	30	.545
South Carolina ‍‍‍^{y}	13	–	17	.433	37	–	25	.597
Missouri ‍‍‍	9	–	21	.300	23	–	32	.418
Western
No. 17 Arkansas ^{x}‍‍‍^{y}	20	–	10	.667	44	–	16	.733
No. 2 Texas A&M ‍‍‍^{y}	19	–	11	.633	53	–	15	.779
No. 22 Mississippi State ‍‍‍^{y}	17	–	13	.567	40	–	23	.635
Alabama ‍‍‍^{y}	13	–	17	.433	33	–	24	.579
LSU ‍‍‍^{y}	13	–	17	.433	43	–	23	.652
Ole Miss ‍‍‍	11	–	19	.367	27	–	29	.482
Auburn ‍‍‍	8	–	22	.267	27	–	26	.509
x – Division champion † – Conference champion ‡ – Tournament champion y – Invited to the NCAA Tournament; As of June 24, 2024; Rankings from D1Baseball

The 2024 LSU Tigers baseball team represented Louisiana State University during the 2024 NCAA Division I baseball season. The Tigers play their home games at Alex Box Stadium. LSU entered this season seeking to defend their 2023 national title.

== Previous season ==
The Tigers finished 54–17, 19–10 in the SEC to finish in second place in the Western division. The Tigers went 1–2 in the 2022 Southeastern Conference baseball tournament. The Tigers were seeded first in the Baton Regional, and fifth overall, of the 2023 NCAA Division I baseball tournament, where they swept the regional with wins over Tulane and Oregon State. In the Baton Rouge Super Regional, the Tigers hosted Kentucky, where they swept them in two games. The Tigers qualified for the College World Series for the 19th time in program history, where they reached the final thanks to wins over Tennessee and top-seeded Wake Forest.

In the final, they beat Florida two games to one to win their seventh national title, and their first since 2009. LSU pitcher, Paul Skenes, was named the College World Series Most Outstanding Player. Additionally, Ty Floyd, Tre' Morgan, Gavin Dugas, Tommy White, Dylan Crews, and Cade Beloso were named to the College World Series All-Tournament Team.

== Signing day recruits ==
The following players signed National Letter of Intents to play for LSU in 2024.

Player	Hometown	High School
Pitchers
Jake Brown	Sulphur, Louisiana	Sulphur (LA)
Kade Anderson	Madisonville, Louisiana	St. Paul's (LA)
MJ Seo	Carrollton, Texas	Hebron (TX)
Dylan Thompson	Moss Bluff, Louisiana	Sam Houston (LA)
Trenton Lape	Bossier City, Louisiana	Parkway (LA)
Cam Johnson	Upper Marlboro, Maryland	IMG Academy
Hitters
Steven Milam	Las Cruces, New Mexico	Centennial (AZ)
Ryan Kucherak	Chandler, Arizona	Hamilton (AZ)
Austen Roellig	Rancho Cucamonga, California	Etiwanda
Derrick Mitchell	Plano, Texas	John Paul II
Ashton Larson	Overland Park, Kansas	St. Thomas Aquinas (KS)
Griffin Cooley	Kinder, Louisiana	Kinder (LA)
Dallas Dale II	Apopka, Florida	Mount Dora Christian

== Offseason ==
=== Transfers ===
Incoming transfers
Name	Number	Pos.	Height	Weight	Year	Hometown	Previous school
Justin Loer	6	LHP	6 ft 5 in (1.96 m)	214	Jr.	Lakeville, Minnesota	Xavier
Mac Bingham	9	OF	5 ft 11 in (1.80 m)	182	Sr.	San Diego, California	Arizona
Michael Braswell III	10	INF	6 ft 2 in (1.88 m)	204	Jr.	Mableton, Georgia	South Carolina
Gage Jump	23	LHP	6 ft 0 in (1.83 m)	197	RS-Jr.	Aliso Viejo, California	UCLA
Kade Woods	25	RHP	6 ft 3 in (1.91 m)	217	RS-So.	West Monroe, Louisiana	Alabama
Luke Holman	38	RHP	6 ft 4 in (1.93 m)	201	Jr.	Sinking Spring, Pennsylvania	Alabama
Fidel Ulloa	40	RHP	6 ft 2 in (1.88 m)	205	Jr.	Lodi, California	San Joaquin Delta College

Outgoing transfers
Name	Number	Pos.	Height	Weight	Year	Hometown	New school
Josh Stevenson	23	OF	6 ft 1 in (1.85 m)	195	So.	Youngsville, Louisiana	Ohio State
Kaleb Applebey	45	RHP	6 ft 7 in (2.01 m)	245	RS-So.	Mount Carmel, Illinois	Austin Peay

=== 2023 MLB draft ===
Thirteen LSU players were drafted in the 2023 MLB draft.

Round	Pick	Player	Position	MLB Team
1	1	Paul Skenes	RHP	Pittsburgh Pirates
1	2	Dylan Crews	OF	Washington Nationals
CB-A	38	Ty Floyd	RHP	Cincinnati Reds
2	51	Grant Taylor	RHP	Chicago White Sox
3	88	Tre' Morgan	1B	Tampa Bay Devil Rays
6	165	Gavin Dugas	LF	Washington Nationals
11	333	Garrett Edwards	RHP	Tampa Bay Devil Rays
12	361	Blake Money	RHP	Baltimore Orioles
12	365	Brayden Jobert	OF	St. Louis Cardinals
13	391	Riley Cooper	LHP	Baltimore Orioles
15	460	Jordan Thompson	SS	Los Angeles Dodgers
16	490	Javen Coleman	LHP	Los Angeles Dodgers
19	576	Christian Little	RHP	New York Mets

== Personnel ==
=== Roster ===
2024 LSU Tigers baseball roster
Pitchers: 0 - Aiden Moffett - Sophomore; 6 - Justin Loer - Junior; 14 - Nic Bronzini - (redshirt) Freshman; 17 - Sam Dutton - Junior; 23 - Gage Jump - (redshirt) Sophomore; 25 - Kade Woods - (redshirt) Sophomore; 26 - Thatcher Hurd - Junior; 27 - Jaden Noot - (redshirt) Freshman; 29 - Micah Bucknam - Sophomore; 30 - Nate Ackenhausen - Senior; 32 - Kade Anderson - Freshman; 34 - Chase Shores - (redshirt) Freshman; 35 - Griffin Herring - Sophomore; 38 - Luke Holman - Junior; 40 - Fidel Ulloa - Junior; 41 - DJ Primeaux - (redshirt) Freshman; 48 - Will Hellmers - Senior; 49 - Javen Coleman - (redshirt) Junior; 55 - Cam Johnson - Freshman; 99 - Christian Little - Senior	Catchers: 7 - Alex Milazzo - Graduate; 8 - Hayden Travinski - Graduate; 16 - Brady Neal - Sophomore; 22 - Jared Jones - Sophomore; Infielders: 1 - Gavin Guidry - Sophomore; 4 - Steven Milam - Freshman; 5 - Ben Nippolt - Senior; 10 - Michael Braswell III - Junior; 11 - Josh Pearson - Junior; 20 - Ryan Kucherak - Freshman; 24 - Austen Roellig - Freshman; 47 - Tommy White - Junior	Outfielders: 9 - Mac Bingham - Senior; 13 - Mic Paul - Sophomore; 28 - Paxton Kling - Sophomore; 39 - Zeb Ruddell - (redshirt) Freshman; 43 - Derrick Mitchell - Freshman; 44 - Ashton Larson - Freshman; Utility: 18 - Jake Brown - Freshman; 33 - Ethan Frey - Sophomore

== Schedule and results ==
2024 LSU Tigers baseball game log (43–22)
Fall 2023 exhibitions (2–0)

November (2–0)
Date	Opponent	Site/stadium	Score	Win	Loss	Save	TV	Attendance
November 5	at McNeese	Joe Miller Ballpark; Lake Charles, LA	**W** 9–6^{18}	**Loer**	Morrow	None	LSUSports.net	1,392
November 12	Louisiana	Alex Box Stadium; Baton Rouge, LA	**W** 14–3^{18}	**Jump**	Etheridge	None	LSUSports.net	3,494
November 17	Purple/Gold World Series Game 1	Alex Box Stadium	**PUR** 2–1	Dutton	Bronzini	Ulloa	LSUSports.net	4,959
November 18	Purple/Gold World Series Game 2	Alex Box Stadium	**PUR** 3–2	Little	Loer	Moffett	LSUSports.net	5,301

Regular season (36–20)

February (8–1)
Date	Opponent	Rank	Site/stadium	Score	Win	Loss	Save	TV	Attendance	Overall record	SEC record
February 16	VMI*	No. 4	Alex Box Stadium; Baton Rouge, LA	**W** 11–8	**Ackenhausen** (1–0)	Lloyd (0–1)	**Jump** (1)	SECN+	11,649	1–0	—
February 17	Central Arkansas*	No. 4	Alex Box Stadium	**W** 2–0	**Holman** (1–0)	MacRae (0–1)	**Dutton** (1)	SECN+	10,709	2–0	—
February 18	VMI*	No. 4	Alex Box Stadium	**W** 27–5^{7}	**Coleman** (1–0)	Jones (0–1)	None	SECN+	10,641	3–0	—
February 19	Central Arkansas*	No. 3	Alex Box Stadium	**W** 4–3	**Anderson** (1–0)	Parlin (0–1)	**Ulloa** (1)	SECN+	9,639	4–0	—
February 22	Northern Illinois*	No. 3	Alex Box Stadium	**W** 10–2	**Ackenhausen** (2–0)	Meyer (0–2)	None	SECN+	9,586	5–0	—
February 23	Stony Brook*	No. 3	Alex Box Stadium	**L** 2–5	Smink (1–1)	**Hurd** (0–1)	Paulsen (1)	SECN+	10,303	5–1	—
February 24	Northern Illinois*	No. 3	Alex Box Stadium	**W** 5–2	**Holman** (2–0)	Stewart (0–1)	**Guidry** (1)	SECN+	11,339	6–1	—
February 25	Stony Brook*	No. 3	Alex Box Stadium	**W** 18–10	**Coleman** (2–0)	Book (0–2)	None	SECN+	10,682	7–1	—
February 28	at Rice*	No. 3	Reckling Park; Houston, TX	**W** 16–4	**Anderson** (2–0)	Fernandez (0–1)	None	ESPN+	4,610	8–1	—

March (12–8)
Date	Opponent	Rank	Site/stadium	Score	Win	Loss	Save	TV	Attendance	Overall record	SEC record
Astros Foundation Classic
March 1	vs. No. 15 Texas*	No. 3	Minute Maid Park; Houston, TX	**W** 6–3	**Holman** (3–0)	Johnson (1–1)	None	YouTube	24,927	9–1	—
March 2	vs. Louisiana*	No. 3	Minute Maid Park	**W** 5–4	**Jump** (1–0)	Herrmann (1–1)	**Loer** (1)	YouTube	21,726	10–1	—
March 3	vs. Texas State*	No. 3	Minute Maid Park	**W** 10–5	**Hurd** (1–1)	Hall (0–1)	None	YouTube	14,726	11–1	—
March 6	at Southeastern Louisiana*	No. 3	Pat Kenelly Diamond; Hammond, LA	**W** 4–3	**Guidry** (1–0)	Rodriguez (0–1)	**Ackenhausen** (1)	ESPN+	3,751	12–1	—
March 8	Xavier*	No. 3	Alex Box Stadium	**W** 4–0	**Holman** (4–0)	Hoskins (2–2)	**Herring** (1)	SECN+	10,171	13–1	—
March 9	Xavier*	No. 3	Alex Box Stadium	**W** 8–2	**Jump** (2–0)	Hughes (0–3)	None	SECN+	11,065	14–1	—
March 10	Xavier*	No. 3	Alex Box Stadium	**L** 1–2	Boyle (2–0)	**Ackenhausen** (2–1)	Hooker (1)	SECN+	10,282	14–2	—
March 12	North Dakota State*	No. 2	Alex Box Stadium	**W** 6–1	**Loer** (1–0)	Wilson (1–2)	**Coleman** (1)	SECN+	9,909	15–2	—
March 13	North Dakota State*	No. 2	Alex Box Stadium	**W** 7–0	**Hellmers** (1–0)	Sargeant (0–1)	None	SECN+	9,833	16–2	—
March 15	at No. 21 Mississippi State	No. 2	Dudy Noble Field; Starkville, MS	**L** 4–10	Stevens (2–0)	**Holman** (4–1)	None	SECN+	11,111	16–3	0–1
March 16	at No. 21 Mississippi State	No. 2	Dudy Noble Field	**W** 9–8	**Herring** (1–0)	Stephen (2–2)	**Ackenhausen** (2)	SECN	13,974	17–3	1–1
March 17	at No. 21 Mississippi State	No. 2	Dudy Noble Field	**L** 5–15^{8}	Cijntje (4–0)	**Hurd** (1–2)	None	SECN+	11,129	17–4	1–2
March 19	Louisiana Tech*	No. 5	Alex Box Stadium	**W** 11–1^{8}	**Herring** (2–0)	Copeland (3–2)	None	SECN+	10,946	18–4	—
March 22	No. 6 Florida	No. 5	Alex Box Stadium	**W** 6–1	**Holman** (5–1)	Fisher (2–2)	**Herring** (2)	SECN	12,539	19–4	2–2
March 23	No. 6 Florida	No. 5	Alex Box Stadium	**L** 4–6^{11}	Slater (2–0)	**Ackenhausen** (2–2)	None	SECN+	12,892	19–5	2–3
March 24	No. 6 Florida	No. 5	Alex Box Stadium	**L** 2–12^{8}	Caglianone (3–0)	**Thatcher** (1–3)	None	SECN	11,648	19–6	2–4
March 26	Southeastern Louisiana*	No. 9	Alex Box Stadium	**W** 8–4	**Loer** (2–0)	Hayden (2–1)	None	SECN+	10,517	20–6	—
March 28	at No. 1 Arkansas	No. 9	Baum–Walker Stadium; Fayetteville, AR	**L** 4–7	Smith (5–0)	**Ulloa** (0–1)	Hewlett (1)	ESPN2	11,027	20–7	2–5
March 29	at No. 1 Arkansas	No. 9	Baum-Walker Stadium	**L** 3–4^{10}	Hewlett (1–0)	**Hurd** (1–4)	None	SECN	11,156	20–8	2–6
March 30	at No. 1 Arkansas	No. 9	Baum-Walker Stadium	**L** 5–7	Frank (1–0)	**Ackenhausen** (2–3)	McEntire (3)	SECN+	10,924	20–9	2–7

April (9–8)
Date	Opponent	Rank	Site/stadium	Score	Win	Loss	Save	TV	Attendance	Overall record	SEC record
April 1	Southern*	No. 25	Alex Box Stadium	**L** 7–12	Harris (1–2)	**Anderson** (2–1)	Burkett II (3)	SECN+	10,222	20–10	—
April 5	No. 7 Vanderbilt	No. 25	Alex Box Stadium	**W** 10–6	**Holman** (6–1)	Carter (3–1)	**Herring** (3)	ESPN2	10,778	21–10	3–7
April 6	No. 7 Vanderbilt	No. 25	Alex Box Stadium	**L** 6–8	McElvain (1–1)	**Ackenhausen** (2–4)	None	SECN	12,315	21–11	3–8
April 7	No. 7 Vanderbilt	No. 25	Alex Box Stadium	**L** 3–13^{8}	Holton (5–0)	**Coleman** (2–1)	None	SECN+	12,076	21–12	3–9
April 9	McNeese*		Alex Box Stadium	**W** 16–0	**Anderson** (3–1)	Caraway (2–3)	None	SECN+	9,937	22–12	—
April 12	at No. 4 Tennessee		Lindsey Nelson Stadium; Knoxville, TN	**L** 3–6	Causey (6–2)	**Jump** (2–1)	Connell (2)	ESPNU	5,901	22–13	3–10
April 13	at No. 4 Tennessee		Lindsey Nelson Stadium	**L** 1–3	Beam (5–1)	**Holman** (6–2)	Snead (3)	SECN	6,155	22–14	3–11
April 14	at No. 4 Tennessee		Lindsey Nelson Stadium	**L** 4–8	Behnke (1–0)	**Moffett** (0–1)	Combs (1)	SECN	6,092	22–15	3–12
April 16	New Orleans*		Alex Box Stadium	**W** 6–3	**Little** (1–0)	Usey (0–2)	**Ulloa** (2)	SECN+	10,324	23–15	—
April 19	at Missouri		Taylor Stadium; Columbia, MO	**W** 12–1^{7}	**Jump** (3–1)	Lunceford (1–3)	None	SECN	1,862	24–15	4–12
April 20	at Missouri		Taylor Stadium	**L** 7–8	Pimental (2–2)	**Holman** (6–3)	Magdic (2)	SECN+	2,153	24–16	4–13
April 21	at Missouri		Taylor Stadium	**W** 6–2	**Herring** (3–0)	Mayer (1–5)	None	SECN+	2,587	25–16	5–13
April 23	Nicholls*		Alex Box Stadium	**W** 9–0	**Anderson** (4–1)	Desandro (4–4)	None	SECN+	10,465	26–16	—
April 26	Auburn		Alex Box Stadium	**W** 5–0	**Jump** (4–1)	Watts (0–2)	None	SECN+	11,006	27–16	6–13
April 27	Auburn		Alex Box Stadium	**W** 3–2	**Hurd** (2–4)	McBride (3–3)	None	SECN+	11,603	28–16	7–13
April 28	Auburn		Alex Box Stadium	**L** 5–7	Armstrong (1–1)	**Anderson** (4–2)	Carlson (1)	SECN+	10,531	28–17	7–14
April 30	Grambling State*		Alex Box Stadium	**W** 26–2^{7}	**Coleman** (3–1)	Peguero (1–9)	None	SECN+	9,836	29–17	—

May (7–3)
Date	Opponent	Rank	Site/stadium	Score	Win	Loss	Save	TV	Attendance	Overall record	SEC record
May 3	No. 1 Texas A&M		Alex Box Stadium	**W** 6–4	**Ulloa** (1–1)	Prager (8–1)	**Herring** (4)	ESPN2	11,007	30–17	8–14
May 4	No. 1 Texas A&M		Alex Box Stadium	**W** 6–4	**Little** (2–0)	Sdao (3–1)	**Guidry** (2)	ESPN2	11,751	31–17	9–14
May 5	No. 1 Texas A&M		Alex Box Stadium	**L** 4–14	Cortez (7–2)	**Dutton** (0–1)	None	SECN+	10,747	31–18	9–15
May 7	Northwestern State*		Alex Box Stadium	**W** 6–5	**Guidry** (2–0)	Bunch (2–1)	None	SECN+	10,107	32–18	—
May 10	at Alabama		Sewell-Thomas Stadium; Tuscaloosa, AL	**L** 7–8	Buchanan (2–1)	**Herring** (3–1)	None	SECN+	5,800	32–19	9–16
May 11	at Alabama		Sewell-Thomas Stadium	**W** 6–3	**Holman** (7–3)	Adams (4–4)	**Guidry** (3)	SECN+	5,800	33–19	10–16
May 12	at Alabama		Sewell-Thomas Stadium	**L** 3–4	Hess (4–4)	**Dutton** (0–2)	Myers (3)	SECN+	3,760	33–20	10–17
May 16	Ole Miss		Alex Box Stadium	**W** 5–1	**Jump** (5–1)	Maddox (3–7)	**Herring** (5)	SECN	10,437	34–20	11–17
May 17	Ole Miss		Alex Box Stadium	**W** 4–2	**Holman** (8–3)	Doyle (3–3)	**Herring** (6)	SECN+	10,856	35–20	12–17
May 18	Ole Miss		Alex Box Stadium	**W** 9–3	**Ackenhausen** (3–4)	Nichols (4–2)	None	SECN+	11,685	36–20	13–17

Postseason (7–2)

SEC Tournament (4–1)
Date	Opponent	Seed	Site/stadium	Score	Win	Loss	Save	TV	Attendance	Overall record	SECT Record
May 21	vs. (6) No. 11 Georgia	(11)	Hoover Metropolitan Stadium; Hoover, AL	**W** 9–1	**Jump** (6–1)	Evans (3–2)	None	SECN	7,425	37–20	1–0
May 22	vs. (3) No. 2 Kentucky	(11)	Hoover Metropolitan Stadium	**W** 11–0^{8}	**Holman** (9–3)	Smith (3–4)	None	SECN	7,185	38–20	2–0
May 23	vs. (10) South Carolina	(11)	Hoover Metropolitan Stadium	**W** 11–10	**Ulloa** (2–1)	Veach (4–2)	None	SECN	11,923	39–20	3–0
May 25	vs. (10) South Carolina	(11)	Hoover Metropolitan Stadium	**W** 12–11^{10}	**Herring** (4–1)	Gainey (1–4)	None	SECN	14,386	40–20	4–0
May 26	vs. (1) No. 1 Tennessee	(11)	Hoover Metropolitan Stadium	**L** 3–4	Russell (0–1)	**Ackenhausen** (3–5)	None	SECN	15,686	40–21	4–1

NCAA Tournament – Chapel Hill Regional (3–1)
Date	Opponent	Seed	Site/stadium	Score	Win	Loss	Save	TV	Attendance	Overall record	NCAAT Record
May 31	vs. (3) Wofford	(2) No. 24	Boshamer Stadium; Chapel Hill, NC	**W** 4–3	**Herring** (5–1)	Bouchard (0–5)	None	ESPNU	3,363	41–21	1–0
June 1	vs. (1) No. 6 North Carolina	(2) No. 24	Boshamer Stadium	**L** 2–6	Peterson (3–2)	**Holman** (9–4)	Pence (7)	ESPN2	3,230	41–22	1–1
June 2	vs. (3) Wofford	(2) No. 24	Boshamer Stadium	**W** 13–6	**Herring** (6–1)	Michaels (3–2)	None	ESPN	3,362	42–22	2–1
June 2	vs. (1) No. 6 North Carolina	(2) No. 24	Boshamer Stadium	**W** 8–4	**Hurd** (3–4)	Haugh (4–2)	None	ESPN+	4,098	43–22	3–1
June 3	vs. (1) No. 6 North Carolina	(2) No. 24	Boshamer Stadium	**L** 3–4^{10}	Pence (4–1)	Jump (6-2)	None	ESPN2	4,026	43–23	3–2

*Denotes non–conference game • Schedule source • Rankings based on the teams' current ranking in the D1Baseball poll
**W** LSU win • **L** LSU loss • Postponement or cancellation • **Bold** denotes LSU player

== Statistics ==
=== Record vs. conference opponents ===
Last two did not qualify for conf. tourn. Blank are not scheduled. Blue are home games, otherwise away.

2024 SEC baseball records Source: 2024 SEC baseball game results, 2024 SEC baseball schedule
Team	W–L	ALA	ARK	AUB	FLA	UGA	KEN	LSU	MSU	MIZZ	MISS	SCAR	TENN	TAMU	VAN	Team	Div	SR	SW
ALA	13–17		2–1	1–2	.	0–3	0–3	2–1	1–2	.	2–1	2–1	2–1	1–2	.	ALA	W4	5–5	0–2
ARK	20–10	1–2		2–1	2–1	.	1–2	3–0	2–1	3–0	3–0	2–1	.	1–2	.	ARK	W1	7–3	3–0
AUB	8–22	2–1	1–2		.	.	0–3	1–2	0–3	2–1	1–2	.	1–2	0–3	0–3	AUB	W7	2–8	0–4
FLA	13–17	.	1–2	.		2–1	1–2	2–1	2–1	0–3	.	1–2	1–2	2–1	1–2	FLA	E5	4–6	0–1
UGA	17–13	3–0	.	.	1–2		0–3	.	1–2	2–1	2–1	3–0	1–2	1–2	3–0	UGA	E3	5–5	3–1
KEN	22–8	3–0	2–1	3–0	2–1	3–0		.	.	2–1	3–0	1–2	1–2	.	2–1	KEN	E2	8–2	4–0
LSU	13–17	1–2	0–3	2–1	1–2	.	.		1–2	2–1	3–0	.	0–3	2–1	1–2	LSU	W5	4–6	1–2
MSU	17–13	2–1	1–2	3–0	1–2	2–1	.	2–1		2–1	1–2	.		1–2	2–1	MSU	W3	6–4	1–0
MIZZ	9–21	.	0–3	1–2	3–0	1–2	1–2	1–2	1–2		.	1–2	0–3	.	0–3	MIZZ	E7	1–9	1–3
MISS	11–19	1–2	0–3	2–1	.	1–2	0–3	0–3	2–1	.		2–1	1–2	2–1	.	MISS	W6	4–6	0–3
SCAR	13–17	1–2	1–2	.	2–1	0–3	2–1	.	.	2–1	1–2		0–3	1–2	3–0	SCAR	E6	4–6	1–2
TENN	22–8	1–2	.	2–1	2–1	2–1	2–1	3–0	.	3–0	2–1	3–0		.	2–1	TENN	E1	9–1	3–0
TAMU	19–11	2–1	2–1	3–0	1–2	2–1	.	1–2	2–1	.	1–2	2–1	.		3–0	TAMU	W2	7–3	2–0
VAN	13–17	.	.	3–0	2–1	0–3	1–2	2–1	1–2	3–0	.	0–3	1–2	0–3		VAN	E4	4–6	2–3
Team	W–L	ALA	ARK	AUB	FLA	UGA	KEN	LSU	MSU	MIZZ	MISS	SCAR	TENN	TAMU	VAN	Team	Div	SR	SW

Updated for entire regular season. Tie Brkrs: TENN>KEN head to head. MSU>UGA head to head. ALA>VAN & FLA>SCAR & LSU TENN common. VAN>FLA head to head. SCAR>LSU ARK common. ARK SEC Tournament seed>KEN, ARK West champion.

== Rankings ==
Ranking movements Legend: ██ Increase in ranking ██ Decrease in ranking ( ) = First-place votes
	Week																		
Poll	Pre	1	2	3	4	5	6	7	8	9	10	11	12	13	14	15	16	17	Final
Coaches'	2 (11)	2 (11)*	2	2	2	4	7	18											
Baseball America	2	2	2	2	2	5	9	25											
NCBWA†	2	2	2	2	3	5	7	18	25										
D1Baseball	4	3	3	3	2	5	8	18											
Perfect Game	3	3	3	3	2	5	9	16											

† NCBWA ranks 30 teams in their preseason poll, but only ranks 25 teams weekly during the season.
* A new poll was not released for this week, so for comparison purposes, the previous week's ranking is inserted in this week's slot.
