= 2024 Kentucky Wildcats baseball team =

American college baseball season

2024 Kentucky Wildcats baseball

SEC Eastern Division co-champions SEC regular season co-champions Lexington Regional champion Lexington Super Regional champion

College World Series, 1–2
- Conference: Southeastern Conference
- Eastern Division

Ranking
- Coaches: No. 3
- D1Baseball.com: No. 3
- Record: 46–16 (22–8 SEC)
- Head coach: Nick Mingione (8th season)
- Assistant coaches: Dan Roszel; Austin Cousino; Nick Ammirati
- Home stadium: Kentucky Proud Park

2024 Southeastern Conference baseball standings
	Conf.				Overall
Team	W		L	PCT	W		L	PCT
Eastern
No. 1 Tennessee ^{x}‍†‍‡‍^{y}	22	–	8	.733	60	–	13	.822
No. 3 Kentucky ^{x}‍†‍‍^{y}	22	–	8	.733	46	–	16	.742
No. 11 Georgia ‍‍‍^{y}	17	–	13	.567	43	–	17	.717
Vanderbilt ‍‍‍^{y}	13	–	17	.433	38	–	23	.623
No. 8 Florida ‍‍‍^{y}	13	–	17	.433	36	–	30	.545
South Carolina ‍‍‍^{y}	13	–	17	.433	37	–	25	.597
Missouri ‍‍‍	9	–	21	.300	23	–	32	.418
Western
No. 17 Arkansas ^{x}‍‍‍^{y}	20	–	10	.667	44	–	16	.733
No. 2 Texas A&M ‍‍‍^{y}	19	–	11	.633	53	–	15	.779
No. 22 Mississippi State ‍‍‍^{y}	17	–	13	.567	40	–	23	.635
Alabama ‍‍‍^{y}	13	–	17	.433	33	–	24	.579
LSU ‍‍‍^{y}	13	–	17	.433	43	–	23	.652
Ole Miss ‍‍‍	11	–	19	.367	27	–	29	.482
Auburn ‍‍‍	8	–	22	.267	27	–	26	.509
x – Division champion † – Conference champion ‡ – Tournament champion y – Invited to the NCAA Tournament; As of June 24, 2024; Rankings from D1Baseball

The 2024 Kentucky Wildcats baseball team represented the University of Kentucky in the 2024 NCAA Division I baseball season. The Wildcats played their home games at Kentucky Proud Park.

== Previous season ==
The Wildcats finished 40–21, 16–13 in the SEC to finish fifth in the SEC East division. They lost to Alabama in the SEC tournament. The Wildcats then competed in the NCAA tournament, winning the Lexington Regional. They would lose to eventual champion LSU in the Baton Rouge Super Regional.

== Personnel ==
=== Roster ===
2024 Kentucky Wildcats roster
Pitchers: 0 – Jake Titus – Freshman; 10 – Cameron O'Brien – Graduate Student; 11 – Colby Frieda – Junior; 20 – Mason Moore – Junior; 22 – Dominic Niman – Graduate Student; 24 – Ryan Hagenow – Senior; 25 – Seth Logue – Junior; 26 – Drew Lafferty – (redshirt) Freshman; 28 – Hayden Smith – (redshirt) Freshman; 29 – Robert Hogan – Junior; 30 – Aaron Blum – Freshman; 33 – Travis Smith – (redshirt) Sophomore; 36 – Carson Applegate – (redshirt) Freshman; 37 – Raymond Saatman – Freshman; 39 – Cooper Robinson – Junior; 40 – Zach Hise – Junior; 41 – Evan Byers – (redshirt) Junior; 43 – Jackson Nove – Junior; 44 – Jacob Price – Sophomore; 46 – Christian Howe – (redshirt) Sophomore; 48 – Ben Cleaver – Freshman; 49 – Johnny Hummel – Graduate Student; 50 – Evan Hart – Freshman; 51 – Trey Pooser – Graduate Student; 55 – Tommy Skelding – Freshman	Catchers: 7 – Devin Burkes – (redshirt) Junior; 52 – Austin Fawley – (redshirt) Freshman; 54 – Eli Small – Freshman; Infielders: 1 – Patrick Herrera – Junior; 2 – Michael Daly – Senior; 4 – Émilien Pitre – Junior; 6 – Reuben Church – Senior; 9 – Nick Lopez – Graduate Student; 12 – Grant Smith – Senior; 13 – James McCoy – (redshirt) Sophomore; 16 – Landon Franklin – Freshman; 17 – Ethan Hindle – Freshman; 23 – Hudson Brown – Freshman; 25 – Ryan Nicholson – Graduate Student	Outfielders: 8 – Ty Crittenberger – Graduate Student; 14 – Ben Higdon – Junior; 19 – Nolan McCarthy – (redshirt) Junior; 21 – Ryan Waldschmidt – Junior; 34 – Lukas Schramm – (redshirt) Freshman; 42 – Griffin Cameron – Freshman; Utility: 5 – Josh Skrowronski – Freshman; 35 – Blake Bowen – Freshman; 47 – Kyuss Gargett – Freshman

=== Coaching staff ===
2024 Kentucky Wildcats coaching staff
Name	Position
Nick Mingione	Head coach
Dan Roszel	Assistant Coach/Pitching
Austin Cousino	Assistant Coach/Recruiting Coordinator
Nick Ammirati	Volunteer Assistant Coach

== Schedule and results ==
2024 Kentucky Wildcats baseball game log
Regular season

February (7–1)
Date	Opponent	Rank	Site/stadium	Score	Win	Loss	Save	TV	Attendance	Overall record	SEC record
February 16	at USC Upstate		Harley Park; Spartanburg, SC	**W** 11–7	**Smith** (1–0)	Sullivan (0–1)	None	SECN+	437	1–0	–
February 17	at USC Upstate		Harley Park	**W** 3–0	**Niman** (1–0)	Curtis (0–1)	**Hummel** (1)	SECN+	245	2–0	–
February 18	at USC Upstate		Harley Park	**W** 9–3	**Moore** (1–0)	Proger (0–1)	None	SECN+	270	3–0	–
February 20	Morehead State		Kentucky Proud Park	**W** 9–5	**Nove** (1–0)	Bettio (0–1)	None	SECN+	2,844	4–0	–
Karbach Round Rock Classic
February 23	vs. Washington State		Dell Diamond; Round Rock, TX	**L** 4–6	Taylor (2–0)	**Smith** (1–1)	Grillo (1)	D1Baseball		4–1	–
February 24	vs. Texas State		Dell Diamond	**W** 11–5	**Niman** (2–0)	Stroud (1–1)	None	D1Baseball	4,105	5–1	–
February 25	vs. Kansas		Dell Diamond	**W** 8–5	**Byers** (1–0)	Steitz (1–1)	None	D1Baseball		6–1	–
February 27	Western Kentucky		Kentucky Proud Park	**W** 5–0	**O'Brien** (1–0)	Bosecker (0–1)	None	SECN+	2,226	7–1	–

March (17–3)
Date	Opponent	Rank	Site/stadium	Score	Win	Loss	Save	TV	Attendance	Overall record	SEC record
March 1	Lipscomb		Kentucky Proud Park	**W** 7–4	**Pooser** (1–0)	Brewer (0–2)	**Nove** (1)	SECN+	1,774	8–1	–
March 2	Lipscomb		Kentucky Proud Park	**W** 16–1^{7}	**Niman** (3–0)	Witzke (0–1)	None	SECN+	2,207	9–1	–
March 3	Lipscomb		Kentucky Proud Park	**W** 9–1	**Moore** (2–0)	Dunkleberger (1–2)	None	SECN+	2,803	10–1	–
March 5	Eastern Kentucky		Kentucky Proud Park	**W** 10–0^{7}	**Lafferty** (1–0)	Hall (0–3)	None	SECN+	1,906	11–1	–
March 6	at Eastern Kentucky		Turkey Hughes Field; Richmond, KY	**W** 5–2	**Hummel** (1–0)	Blanton (0–2)	**Pooser** (1)	ESPN+	1,021	12–1	–
March 8	Kennesaw State		Kentucky Proud Park	**L** 1–12^{8}	Osbolt (2–0)	**Smith** (1–2)	None	SECN+	1,922	12–2	–
March 9	Kennesaw State		Kentucky Proud Park	**L** 2–10	Aita (1–0)	**Niman** (3–1)	None	SECN+	1,980	12–3	–
March 10	Kennesaw State		Kentucky Proud Park	**W** 5–2	**Moore** (3–0)	Pinson (0–4)	**Pooser** (2)	SECN+	2,044	13–3	–
March 12	Murray State		Kentucky Proud Park	**W** 10–6	**Cleaver** (1–0)	Roulette (2–1)	None	SECN+	2,040	14–3	–
March 15	Georgia		Kentucky Proud Park	**W** 16–10	**Byers** (2–0)	Smith (1–1)	None	SECN+	2,040	15–3	1–0
March 16	Georgia		Kentucky Proud Park	**W** 9–3	**Niman** (4–1)	Finley (2–1)	**Nove** (2)	SECN+	2,893	16–3	2–0
March 17	Georgia		Kentucky Proud Park	**W** 12–2^{7}	**Moore** (4–0)	Mracna (2–1)	None	SECN+	2,899	17–3	3–0
March 19	Evansville		Kentucky Proud Park	**W** 11–3	**Cleaver** (2–0)	Bell (2–1)	None	SECN+	2,007	18–3	–
March 22	at Missouri		Taylor Stadium; Columbia, MO	**W** 9–4^{11}	**Hummel** (2–0)	Rustad (3–3)	None	SECN+	1,011	19–3	4–0
March 23	at Missouri		Taylor Stadium	**L** 1–2	Pimental (1–0)	**Niman** (4–2)	Mayer (1)	SECN+	1,250	19–4	4–1
March 24	at Missouri		Taylor Stadium	**W** 7–6	**Moore** (5–0)	Lohse (0–2)	**McCoy** (1)	SECN	977	20–4	5–1
March 26	Miami	No. 24	Kentucky Proud Park	**W** 11–3	**Cleaver** (2–0)	Preisel (0–1)	None	SECN+	2,138	21–4	–
March 29	at Ole Miss	No. 24	Swayze Field; Oxford, MS	**W** 5–3	**Byers** (3–0)	Maddox (2–2)	**Hummel** (2)	SECN+	9,650	22–4	6–1
March 30	at Ole Miss	No. 24	Swayze Field	**W** 17–9	**Niman** (5–2)	Doyle (2–1)	None	SECN+	10,149	23–4	7–1
March 31	at Ole Miss	No. 24	Swayze Field	**W** 15–1^{7}	**Moore** (6–0)	Dennis (3–2)	None	SECN+	9,040	24–4	8–1

April (9–5)
Date	Opponent	Rank	Site/stadium	Score	Win	Loss	Save	TV	Attendance	Overall record	SEC record
April 3	Louisville	No. 17	Kentucky Proud Park	Postponed (weather)							
April 5	No. 13 Alabama	No. 17	Kentucky Proud Park	**W** 6–2	**Pooser** (3–0)	Hess (3–2)	None	SECN+	2,598	25–4	9–1
April 6	No. 13 Alabama	No. 17	Kentucky Proud Park	**W** 7–0	**Niman** (6–2)	Farone (3–1)	None	SECN+	3,886	26–4	10–1
April 7	No. 13 Alabama	No. 17	Kentucky Proud Park	**W** 10–1	**Moore** (7–0)	Adams (2–2)	None	SECN	3,579	27–4	11–1
April 9	at Samford	No. 8	Joe Lee Griffin Stadium; Birmingham, AL	**L** 7–9	Clevenger (1–0)	**Lafferty** (1–1)	None	ESPN+	313	27–5	–
April 11	at Auburn	No. 8	Plainsman Park; Auburn, AL	**W** 6—5	**Smith** (2–2)	Myers (2–3)	**Hummel** (3)	ESPNU	4,057	28–5	12–1
April 12	at Auburn	No. 8	Plainsman Park	**W** 9–1	**Niman** (7–2)	Allsup (1–3)	None	SECN+	4,830	29–5	13–1
April 13	at Auburn	No. 8	Plainsman Park	**W** 13–8	**Hogan** (1–0)	Tilly (3–1)	**Hummel** (4)	SECN+	5,015	30–5	14–1
April 16	at Louisville	No. 3	Jim Patterson Stadium; Louisville, KY	**W** 17–13	**Robinson** (1–0)	Hartman (0–1)	None	ACCN	4,848	31–5	–
April 19	No. 4 Tennessee	No. 3	Kentucky Proud Park	**W** 5–3	**Smith** (3–2)	Causey (6–3)	**Hummel** (5)	SECN+	6,922	32–5	15–1
April 20	No. 4 Tennessee	No. 3	Kentucky Proud Park	**L** 4–9	Combs (1–1)	**Niman** (7–3)	None	SECN+	7,304	32–6	15–2
April 21	No. 4 Tennessee	No. 3	Kentucky Proud Park	**L** 11–13	Connell (4–0)	**Smith** (3–3)	Phillips (2)	SECN+	6,797	32–7	15–3
April 26	at No. 24 South Carolina	No. 4	Founders Park; Columbia, SC	**L** 5–6^{10}	Veach (3–1)	**Byers** (3–1)	None	SECN+	7,467	32–8	15–4
April 27	at No. 24 South Carolina	No. 4	Founders Park	**W** 15–13	**Robinson** (2–0)	Jones (3–2)	**Hagenow** (1)	SECN	7,512	33–8	16–4
April 28	at No. 24 South Carolina	No. 4	Founders Park	**L** 0–10^{7}	Eskew (3–3)	**Moore** (7–1)	None	SECN	7,484	33–9	16–5

May (6–3)
Date	Opponent	Rank	Site/stadium	Score	Win	Loss	Save	TV	Attendance	Overall record	SEC record
May 3	No. 2 Arkansas	No. 8	Kentucky Proud Park	**L** 3–10	Smith (9–0)	**Pooser** (3–1)	None	SECN+	4,742	33–10	16–6
May 4	No. 2 Arkansas	No. 8	Kentucky Proud Park	**W** 11–3	**Niman** (8–3)	Tygart (4–2)	None	SECN+	4,015	34–10	17–6
May 5	No. 2 Arkansas	No. 8	Kentucky Proud Park	**W** 7–4	**Moore** (8–1)	Molina (3–2)	**Hummel** (6)	SECN+	6,024	35–10	18–6
May 7	at Xavier		J. Page Hayden Field; Cincinnati, OH	Cancelled (weather)							
May 10	at Florida	No. 4	Condron Ballpark; Gainesville, FL	**W** 12–11^{10}	**Hummel** (3–0)	Fisher (3–3)	**Hagenow** (2)	SECN+	5,294	36–10	19–6
May 11	at Florida	No. 4	Condron Ballpark	**L** 1–10	Peterson (2–4)	**Niman** (8–4)	Slater (1)	SECN	5,571	36–11	19–7
May 12	at Florida	No. 4	Condron Ballpark	**W** 7–5^{10}	**Hagenow** (1–0)	Neely (1–4)	**Cleaver** (1)	SECN	6,083	37–11	20–7
May 14	Wright State	No. 2	Kentucky Proud Park	Cancelled (weather)							
May 16	Vanderbilt	No. 2	Kentucky Proud Park	**W** 10–5	**Pooser** (4–1)	Cunningham (6–4)	None	SECN+	4,384	38–11	21–7
May 17	Vanderbilt	No. 2	Kentucky Proud Park	**W**17–7^{7}	**Hagenow** (2–0)	Holton (6–4)	None	SECN+	4,071	39–11	22–7
May 18	Vanderbilt	No. 2	Kentucky Proud Park	**L**4–12	Futrell (4–1)	**Moore** (8–2)	None	SECN+	5,641	39–12	22–8

Postseason

SEC Tournament
Date	Opponent	Seed	Site/stadium	Score	Win	Loss	Save	TV	Attendance	Overall record	SECT Record
May 22	(11) LSU	3	Hoover Metropolitan Stadium; Hoover, AL	**L** 0–11^{8}	Holman (9–3)	**Smith** (3–4)	None	SECN		39–13	0–1
May 23	(2) Arkansas	3	Hoover Metropolitan Stadium	**W** 9–6	**Pooser** (5–1)	Smith (9–1)	None	SECN		40–13	1–1
May 24	(10) South Carolina	3	Hoover Metropolitan Stadium	**L** 5–6	Marlatt (3–0)	**Moore** (8–3)	Becker (1)	SECN		40–14	1–2

NCAA tournament: Lexington Regional
Date	Opponent	Rank	Stadium Site	Score	Win	Loss	Save	Attendance	Overall Record	Regional Record
May 31	Western Michigan; First round	2	Kentucky Proud Park	**W** 10-8	**O'Brien** (2–0)	Miller (6–6)	**Hogan** (1)	5,861	41–14	1–0
June 1	Illinois; Second round	2	Kentucky Proud Park	**W** 6-1	**Pooser** (6–1)	Hutchings (4–3)	**Hagenow** (3)	6,066	42–14	2–0
June 2	Indiana State; Regional championship	2	Kentucky Proud Park	**W** 5-0	**Moore** (9–3)	Gilley (3–1)	None	5,877	43–14	3–0

NCAA tournament: Lexington Super Regional
Date	Opponent	Rank	Stadium Site	Score	Win	Loss	Save	Attendance	Overall Record	Super Regional Record
June 8 Game 1	Oregon State	2	Kentucky Proud Park	**W** 10-0	**Pooser** (6–1)	May (7–1)	None	7,441	44–14	1–0
June 9 Game 2	Oregon State	2	Kentucky Proud Park	**W** 3-2	**O'Brien** (3–0)	**Hummel** (7)	Kmatz (7–3)	7,558	45–14	2–0

NCAA tournament: College World Series
Date	Opponent	Rank	Stadium Site	Score	Win	Loss	Save	Attendance	Overall Record	CWS Record
June 15	NC State	2	Charles Schwab Field	**W** 5–4^{10}	**Hummel** (4–0)	Smith (3–2)	None	24,488	46–14	1–0
June 17	Texas A&M	2	Charles Schwab Field	**L** 1–5	Prager (9–1)	**Moore** (9–4)	None	25,327	46–15	1–1
June 19	Florida	2	Charles Schwab Field	**L** 5–15	Coppola (1–4)	**Niman** (8–5)	None	23,687	46–16	1–2

Legend: = Win = Loss = Canceled
Bold = Kentucky team member
Rankings are based on the team's current ranking in the D1Baseball poll.

Schedule source:

== Record vs. conference opponents ==
Last two did not qualify for conf. tourn. Blank are not scheduled. Blue are home games, otherwise away.

2024 SEC baseball records Source: 2024 SEC baseball game results, 2024 SEC baseball schedule
Team	W–L	ALA	ARK	AUB	FLA	UGA	KEN	LSU	MSU	MIZZ	MISS	SCAR	TENN	TAMU	VAN	Team	Div	SR	SW
ALA	13–17		2–1	1–2	.	0–3	0–3	2–1	1–2	.	2–1	2–1	2–1	1–2	.	ALA	W4	5–5	0–2
ARK	20–10	1–2		2–1	2–1	.	1–2	3–0	2–1	3–0	3–0	2–1	.	1–2	.	ARK	W1	7–3	3–0
AUB	8–22	2–1	1–2		.	.	0–3	1–2	0–3	2–1	1–2	.	1–2	0–3	0–3	AUB	W7	2–8	0–4
FLA	13–17	.	1–2	.		2–1	1–2	2–1	2–1	0–3	.	1–2	1–2	2–1	1–2	FLA	E5	4–6	0–1
UGA	17–13	3–0	.	.	1–2		0–3	.	1–2	2–1	2–1	3–0	1–2	1–2	3–0	UGA	E3	5–5	3–1
KEN	22–8	3–0	2–1	3–0	2–1	3–0		.	.	2–1	3–0	1–2	1–2	.	2–1	KEN	E2	8–2	4–0
LSU	13–17	1–2	0–3	2–1	1–2	.	.		1–2	2–1	3–0	.	0–3	2–1	1–2	LSU	W5	4–6	1–2
MSU	17–13	2–1	1–2	3–0	1–2	2–1	.	2–1		2–1	1–2	.		1–2	2–1	MSU	W3	6–4	1–0
MIZZ	9–21	.	0–3	1–2	3–0	1–2	1–2	1–2	1–2		.	1–2	0–3	.	0–3	MIZZ	E7	1–9	1–3
MISS	11–19	1–2	0–3	2–1	.	1–2	0–3	0–3	2–1	.		2–1	1–2	2–1	.	MISS	W6	4–6	0–3
SCAR	13–17	1–2	1–2	.	2–1	0–3	2–1	.	.	2–1	1–2		0–3	1–2	3–0	SCAR	E6	4–6	1–2
TENN	22–8	1–2	.	2–1	2–1	2–1	2–1	3–0	.	3–0	2–1	3–0		.	2–1	TENN	E1	9–1	3–0
TAMU	19–11	2–1	2–1	3–0	1–2	2–1	.	1–2	2–1	.	1–2	2–1	.		3–0	TAMU	W2	7–3	2–0
VAN	13–17	.	.	3–0	2–1	0–3	1–2	2–1	1–2	3–0	.	0–3	1–2	0–3		VAN	E4	4–6	2–3
Team	W–L	ALA	ARK	AUB	FLA	UGA	KEN	LSU	MSU	MIZZ	MISS	SCAR	TENN	TAMU	VAN	Team	Div	SR	SW

Updated for entire regular season. Tie Brkrs: TENN>KEN head to head. MSU>UGA head to head. ALA>VAN & FLA>SCAR & LSU TENN common. VAN>FLA head to head. SCAR>LSU ARK common. ARK SEC Tournament seed>KEN, ARK West champion.

== Rankings ==
Ranking movements Legend: ██ Increase in ranking ██ Decrease in ranking — = Not ranked
	Week																	
Poll	Pre	1	2	3	4	5	6	7	8	9	10	11	12	13	14	15	16	Final
Coaches'	—	—*	—	—	—	25	21	16	8	5	5	8	5	3	2	2	2*	3
Baseball America	—	—	—	—	—	—	23	18	10	7	7	9	6	2	2	2	2*	3
NCBWA†	—	24	—	25	—	21	20	15	8	4	6	8	5	3	2	2	2	4
D1Baseball	—	—	—	—	—	—	24	17	8	3	4	8	4	2	2	2	2*	3
Perfect Game	—	—	—	25	—	24	15	12	9	7	8	11	4	2	2	2	2	5

† NCBWA ranks 30 teams in their preseason poll, but only ranks 25 teams weekly during the season.
* A new poll was not released for this week, so for comparison purposes, the previous week's ranking is inserted in this week's slot.
