= 2024 Mississippi State Bulldogs baseball team =

American college baseball season

2024 Mississippi State Bulldogs baseball

Charlottesville Regional, 2–2
- Conference: Southeastern Conference
- Western Division
- Record: 40–23 (17–13 SEC)
- Head coach: Chris Lemonis (6th season)
- Assistant coaches: Justin Parker; Jake Gautreau
- Home stadium: Dudy Noble Field

2024 Southeastern Conference baseball standings
	Conf.				Overall
Team	W		L	PCT	W		L	PCT
Eastern
No. 1 Tennessee ^{x}‍†‍‡‍^{y}	22	–	8	.733	60	–	13	.822
No. 3 Kentucky ^{x}‍†‍‍^{y}	22	–	8	.733	46	–	16	.742
No. 11 Georgia ‍‍‍^{y}	17	–	13	.567	43	–	17	.717
Vanderbilt ‍‍‍^{y}	13	–	17	.433	38	–	23	.623
No. 8 Florida ‍‍‍^{y}	13	–	17	.433	36	–	30	.545
South Carolina ‍‍‍^{y}	13	–	17	.433	37	–	25	.597
Missouri ‍‍‍	9	–	21	.300	23	–	32	.418
Western
No. 17 Arkansas ^{x}‍‍‍^{y}	20	–	10	.667	44	–	16	.733
No. 2 Texas A&M ‍‍‍^{y}	19	–	11	.633	53	–	15	.779
No. 22 Mississippi State ‍‍‍^{y}	17	–	13	.567	40	–	23	.635
Alabama ‍‍‍^{y}	13	–	17	.433	33	–	24	.579
LSU ‍‍‍^{y}	13	–	17	.433	43	–	23	.652
Ole Miss ‍‍‍	11	–	19	.367	27	–	29	.482
Auburn ‍‍‍	8	–	22	.267	27	–	26	.509
x – Division champion † – Conference champion ‡ – Tournament champion y – Invited to the NCAA Tournament; As of June 24, 2024; Rankings from D1Baseball

The 2024 Mississippi State Bulldogs baseball team represented Mississippi State University in the 2024 NCAA Division I baseball season. The Bulldogs played their home games at Dudy Noble Field.

== Previous season ==
In 2023, the Bulldogs finished 27–26, 9–21 in the SEC to finish in 6th place in the West. The Mississippi State baseball looks to turn things around after having two disappointing seasons back to back.

== Coaching staff ==
2024 Mississippi State Bulldogs baseball coaching staff
- Chris Lemonis – Head coach – 6th year
- Justin Parker – Assistant coach – 1st year
- Jake Gautreau – Assistant coach – 7th year
- Kyle Cheesebrough – Camps coordinator/Volunteer assistant – 6th year

== Schedule and results ==
2024 Mississippi State Bulldogs baseball game log
Regular season (36–19)

February (6–4)
Date	Opponent	Rank	Site/stadium	Score	Win	Loss	Save	TV	Attendance	Overall record	SEC record
February 16	Air Force	–	Dudy Noble Field • Starkville, MS	**W** 8–4	**Tyler Davis (1–0)**	Kyle Moats (0–1)	**Cam Schuelke (1)**	SECN+	11,216	1–0	–
February 17	Air Force	–	Dudy Noble Field • Starkville, MS	**L** 2–3	Doyle Gehring (1–0)	**Colby Holcombe (0–1)**	–	SECN+	11,964	1–1	–
February 18	Air Force	–	Dudy Noble Field • Starkville, MS	**W** 10–2	**Tyson Hardin (1–0)**	Ben Weber (0–1)	–	SECN+	10,762	2–1	–
February 20	Austin Peay	–	Dudy Noble Field • Starkville, MS	**L** 2–3	Lyle Miller-Green (1–0)	**Evan Siary (0–1)**	Tyler Hampu (1)	SECN+	9,319	2–2	–
February 21	Austin Peay	–	Dudy Noble Field • Starkville, MS	**L** 10–13	DJ Merriweather (1–0)	**Cam Schuelke (0–1)**	Titan Hayes (1)	SECN+	9,536	2–3	–
February 23	Georgia Southern	–	Dudy Noble Field • Starkville, MS	**W** 5–1	**Nate Dohm (1–0)**	Thomas Higgins (0–1)	–	SECN+	10,649	3–3	–
February 24	Georgia Southern	–	Dudy Noble Field • Starkville, MS	**L** 4–11	Davis Smith (1–0)	**Khal Stephen (0–1)**	–	SECN+	12,323	3–4	–
February 25	Georgia Southern	–	Dudy Noble Field • Starkville, MS	**W** 10–2	**Jurrangelo Cijntje (1–0)**	Ty Fisher (1–1)	–	SECN+	9,943	4–4	–
February 27	Jackson State	–	Dudy Noble Field • Starkville, MS	**W** 19–6^{7}	**Nolan Stevens (1–0)**	Je-andrick Lourens (0–1)	–	SECN+	8,267	5–4	–
February 29	Mount St. Mary's	–	Dudy Noble Field • Starkville, MS	**W** 12–2	**Nate Dohm (2–0)**	Tommy Moore (1–1)	–	SECN+	8,633	6–4	–

March (13–6)
Date	Opponent	Rank	Site/stadium	Score	Win	Loss	Save	TV	Attendance	Overall record	SEC record
March 1	Mount St. Mary's	–	Dudy Noble Field • Starkville, MS	**postponed to March 2, impending weather**							
March 2	Mount St. Mary's (DH-1)	–	Dudy Noble Field • Starkville, MS	**W** 7–2	**Khal Stephen (1–1)**	Brendan Yagesh (0–2)	–	SECN+	10,922	7–4	–
March 2	Mount St. Mary's (DH-2)	–	Dudy Noble Field • Starkville, MS	**W** 6–0	**Jurrangelo Cijntje (2–0)**	Kyle Speas (0–1)	–	SECN+	10,922	8–4	–
March 5	vs. Southern Miss	–	Trustmark Park • Pearl, MS	**W** 5–4	**Tyson Hardin (2–0)**	Kros Sivley (0–2)	**Brooks Auger (1)**	ESPN+	3,382	9–4	–
March 8	Evansville	–	Dudy Noble Field • Starkville, MS	**W** 5–2	**Nate Dohm (3–0)**	Nick Smith (0–2)	**Brooks Auger (2)**	SECN+	8,786	10–4	–
March 9	Evansville	–	Dudy Noble Field • Starkville, MS	**W** 8–3	**Khal Stephen (2–1)**	Donovan Schultzv (0–1)	–	SECN+	10,452	11–4	–
March 10	Evansville	–	Dudy Noble Field • Starkville, MS	**W** 13–3^{8}	**Jurrangelo Cijntje (3–0)**	Kenton Deverman (2–1)	–	SECN+	9,410	12–4	–
Hancock Whitney Classic
March 12	vs. South Alabama	–	MGM Park • Biloxi, MS	**L** 5–6	Gant Starling (3–0)	**Brooks Auger (0–1)**	Grant Wood (4)	SECN+	6,098	12–5	–
March 13	vs. New Orleans	–	MGM Park • Biloxi, MS	**W** 2–1^{11}	**Cam Schuelke (1–1)**	Brooks Byers (0–1)	–	SECN+	4,009	13–5	–
March 15	No. 2 LSU	–	Dudy Noble Field • Starkville, MS	**W** 10–4	**Nolan Stevens (2–0)**	Luke Holman (4–1)	–	SECN+	11,111	14–5	1–0
March 16	No. 2 LSU	–	Dudy Noble Field • Starkville, MS	**L** 8–9	Griffin Herring (1–0)	**Khal Stephen (2–2)**	Nate Ackenhausen (2)	SECN	13,974	14–6	1–1
March 17	No. 2 LSU	–	Dudy Noble Field • Starkville, MS	**W** 15–5^{8}	**Jurrangelo Cijntje (4–0)**	Thatcher Hurd (1–2)	–	SECN+	11,129	15–6	2–1
March 19	Memphis	No. 21	Dudy Noble Field • Starkville, MS	**W** 17–9	**Colby Holcombe (1–1)**	Jackson Lyons (0–1)	–	SECN+	8,356	16–6	–
March 21	at No. 7 Texas A&M	No. 21	Olsen Field at Blue Bell Park • College Station, TX	**L** 3–6	Ryan Prager (5–0)	**Nolan Stevens (2–1)**	Evan Aschenbeck (3)	ESPNU	4,776	16–7	2–2
March 22	at No. 7 Texas A&M	No. 21	Olsen Field at Blue Bell Park • College Station, TX	**W** 5–1	**Khal Stephen (3–2)**	Tanner Jones (1–1)	–	SECN+	6,443	17–7	3–2
March 23	at No. 7 Texas A&M	No. 21	Olsen Field at Blue Bell Park • College Station, TX	**L** 1–6	Justin Lamkin (2–0)	**Jurrangelo Cijntje (4–1)**	–	SECN+	7,159	17–8	3–3
March 26	at Samford	No. 21	Joe Lee Griffin Stadium • Homewood, AL	**W** 9–5^{10}	**Tyler Davis (2–0)**	Carson Lore (1–2)	–	ESPN+	1,436	18–8	–
March 29	at No. 6 Florida	No. 21	Condron Ballpark • Gainesville, FL	**L** 6–7	Luke McNeillie (1–3)	**Nolan Stevens (2–2)**	–	SECN+	7,167	18–9	3–4
March 30	at No. 6 Florida	No. 21	Condron Ballpark • Gainesville, FL	**W** 12–2	**Jurrangelo Cijntje (5–1)**	Liam Peterson (1–3)	–	SECN+	7,129	19–9	4–4
March 31	at No. 6 Florida	No. 21	Condron Ballpark • Gainesville, FL	**L** 3–4	Luke McNeillie (2–3)	**Evan Siary (0–2)**	–	SECN+	5,829	19–10	4–5

April (10–5)
Date	Opponent	Rank	Site/stadium	Score	Win	Loss	Save	TV	Attendance	Overall record	SEC record
April 2	Central Arkansas	No. 23	Dudy Noble Field • Starkville, MS	**L** 6–7	Coleman MacRae (2–2)	**Logan Forsythe (0–1)**	Charlie Christensen (1)	SECN+	8,386	19–11	–
April 5	Georgia	No. 23	Dudy Noble Field • Starkville, MS	**W** 6–1	**Khal Stephen (4–2)**	Jarvis Evans (2–1)	**Cam Schuelke (2)**	SECN+	12,315	20–11	5–5
April 6	Georgia	No. 23	Dudy Noble Field • Starkville, MS	**L** 2–3	Brian Zeldin (3–0)	**Cam Schuelke (1–2)**	–	SECN	13,477	20–12	5–6
April 7	Georgia	No. 23	Dudy Noble Field • Starkville, MS	**W** 9–8	**Tyler Davis (3–0)**	Josh Roberge (2–1)	–	SECN+	11,337	21–12	6–6
April 9	UAB	No. 22	Dudy Noble Field • Starkville, MS	**canceled, inclement weather**							
April 12	at Ole Miss	No. 22	Swayze Field • Oxford, MS	**W** 8–0	**Khal Stephen (5–2)**	Riley Maddox (2–4)	–	SECN	11,277	22–12	7–6
April 13	at Ole Miss	No. 22	Swayze Field • Oxford, MS	**L** 9–10^{12}	Brayden Jones (1–0)	**Nolan Stevens (2–3)**	–	ESPN2	11,486	22–13	7–7
April 14	at Ole Miss	No. 22	Swayze Field • Oxford, MS	**L** 2–14^{7}	Mason Nichols (4–0)	**Evan Siary (0–3)**	–	SECN+	10,056	22–14	7–8
April 16	Alcorn State	–	Dudy Noble Field • Starkville, MS	**W** 11–0^{7}	**Pico Kohn (1–0)**	Michael Lorenz (0–3)	–	SECN+	9,324	23–14	–
Super Bulldog Weekend
April 19	Auburn	–	Dudy Noble Field • Starkville, MS	**W** 8–1	**Khal Stephen (6–2)**	Dylan Watts (0–1)	–	SECN+	13,357	24–14	8–8
April 20	Auburn	–	Dudy Noble Field • Starkville, MS	**postponed to April 21, inclement weather**							
April 21	Auburn (DH-1)	–	Dudy Noble Field • Starkville, MS	**W** 3–1^{7}	**Jurrangelo Cijntje (6–1)**	Tanner Bauman (2–2)	**Tyson Hardin (1)**	SECN+	12,978	25–14	9–8
April 21	Auburn (DH-2)	–	Dudy Noble Field • Starkville, MS	**W** 4–3^{8}	**Tyson Hardin (3–0)**	Christian Herberholz (1–2)	–	SECN+	12,978	26–14	10–8
April 23	at Memphis	–	FedExPark • Memphis, TN	**W** 6–4	**Cam Schuelke (2–2)**	Logan Rushing (0–3)	**Tyler Davis (1)**	ESPN+	1,612	27–14	–
April 26	at No. 11 Vanderbilt	–	Hawkins Field • Nashville, TN	**L** 0–4	Bryce Cunningham (6–2)	**Khal Stephen (6–3)**	–	SECN+	3,802	27–15	10–9
April 27	at No. 11 Vanderbilt	–	Hawkins Field • Nashville, TN	**W** 7–4	**Brooks Auger (1–1)**	Carter Holton (6–2)	**Tyler Davis (2)**	SECN+	3,802	28–15	11–9
April 28	at No. 11 Vanderbilt	–	Hawkins Field • Nashville, TN	**W** 8–7	**Karson Ligon (1–0)**	Miller Green (1–3)	**Tyson Hardin (2)**	SECN+	3,802	29–15	12–9

May (7–4)
Date	Opponent	Rank	Site/stadium	Score	Win	Loss	Save	TV	Attendance	Overall record	SEC record
May 1	vs. Ole Miss; Governor's Cup	No. 16	Trustmark Park • Pearl, MS	**W** 5–1	**Tyler Davis (4–0)**	Mason Morris (1–2)	–	ESPN2	6,503	30–15	–
May 3	No. 23 Alabama	No. 16	Dudy Noble Field • Starkville, MS	**W** 13–3^{7}	**Khal Stephen (7–3)**	Greg Farone (4–2)	–	SECN+	11,815	31–15	13–9
May 4	No. 23 Alabama	No. 16	Dudy Noble Field • Starkville, MS	**W** 8–1	**Jurrangelo Cijntje (7–1)**	Zane Adams (4–3)	–	SECN+	14,273	32–15	14–9
May 5	No. 23 Alabama	No. 16	Dudy Noble Field • Starkville, MS	**L** 5–10	Braylon Myers (2–1)	**Brooks Auger (1–2)**	–	SECN+	10,935	32–16	14–10
May 10	at No. 5 Arkansas	No. 14	Baum–Walker Stadium • Fayetteville, AR	**L** 5–7	Will McEntire (4–0)	**Tyson Hardin (3–1)**	Gage Wood (2)	SECN+	10,891	32–17	14–11
May 11	at No. 5 Arkansas	No. 14	Baum–Walker Stadium • Fayetteville, AR	**W** 8–5	**Cam Schuelke (3–2)**	Brady Tygart (4–3)	**Tyler Davis (3)**	SECN+	10,963	33–17	15–11
May 12	at No. 5 Arkansas	No. 14	Baum–Walker Stadium • Fayetteville, AR	**L** 6–9	Will McEntire (5–0)	**Cam Schuelke (3–3)**	Gabe Gaeckle (7)	SECN	10,410	33–18	15–12
May 14	North Alabama	No. 16	Dudy Noble Field • Starkville, MS	**W** 8–4	**Cam Schuelke (4–3)**	Carson Howard (1–1)	–	SECN+	9,349	34–18	–
May 16	Missouri	No. 16	Dudy Noble Field • Starkville, MS	**W** 4–3	**Khal Stephen (8–3)**	Ian Lohse (0–4)	**Tyler Davis (4)**	SECN+	10,440	35–18	16–12
May 17	Missouri	No. 16	Dudy Noble Field • Starkville, MS	**W** 8–2	**Jurrangelo Cijntje (8–1)**	Bryce Mayer (2–7)	–	SECN+	10,522	36–18	17–12
May 18	Missouri	No. 16	Dudy Noble Field • Starkville, MS	**L** 3–4	Logan Lunceford (2–5)	**Tyson Hardin (3–2)**	Brock Lucas (2)	SECN+	11,551	36–19	17–13

Post-season (4–4)

SEC Tournament (2–2)
Date	Opponent	Seed/Rank	Site/stadium	Score	Win	Loss	Save	TV	Attendance	Overall record	SECT Record
May 21	vs. (12) Ole Miss	(5) No. 15	Hoover Metropolitan Stadium • Hoover, AL	**W** 2–1	**Tyler Davis (5–0)**	Liam Doyle (3–4)	–	SECN	9,240	37–19	1–0
May 22	vs. (4) No. 4 Texas A&M	(5) No. 15	Hoover Metropolitan Stadium • Hoover, AL	**W** 5–3	**Nate Dohm (4–0)**	Chris Cortez (8–3)	**Tyler Davis (5)**	SECN	11,840	38–19	2–0
May 23	vs. (8) Vanderbilt	(5) No. 15	Hoover Metropolitan Stadium • Hoover, AL	**L** 3–4	JD Thompson (5–1)	**Jurrangelo Cijntje (8–2)**	Ryan Ginther (5)	SECN	11,923	38–20	2–1
May 24	vs. (1) No. 1 Tennessee	(5) No. 15	Hoover Metropolitan Stadium • Hoover, AL	**L** 5–6	Aaron Combs (2–1)	**Tyler Davis (5–1)**	Nate Snead (5)	SECN	13,335	38–21	2–2

NCAA Charlottesville Regional (2–2)
Date	Opponent	Seed/Rank	Site/stadium	Score	Win	Loss	Save	TV	Attendance	Overall record	NCAAT record
May 31	vs. (3) St. Johns	(2) No. 17	Davenport Field at Disharoon Park • Charlottesville, VA	**W** 5–2^{10}	**Tyler Davis (6–1)**	Louis Marinaro (6–3)	–	ESPN+	4,986	39–21	1–0
June 1	at (1) No. 18 Virginia	(2) No. 17	Davenport Field at Disharoon Park • Charlottesville, VA	**L** 4–5	Angelo Tonas (3–0)	**Tyson Hardin (3–3)**	–	ACCN	5,919	39–22	1–1
June 2	vs. (3) St. Johns (DH-1)	(2) No. 17	Davenport Field at Disharoon Park • Charlottesville, VA	**W** 13–5	**Cam Schuelke (5–3)**	Evan Chaffee (3–1)	–	ESPN2	4,903	40–22	2–1
June 2	at (1) No. 18 Virginia (DH-2)	(2) No. 17	Davenport Field at Disharoon Park • Charlottesville, VA	**L** 2–9	Jay Woolfolk (3–1)	**Pico Kohn (1–1)**	–	ACCN	5,919	40–23	2–2

Legend: = Win = Loss = Canceled
Bold = Mississippi State team member
Rankings are based on the team's current ranking in the D1Baseball poll.

== Record vs. conference opponents ==
Last two did not qualify for conf. tourn. Blank are not scheduled. Blue are home games, otherwise away.

2024 SEC baseball records Source: 2024 SEC baseball game results, 2024 SEC baseball schedule
Team	W–L	ALA	ARK	AUB	FLA	UGA	KEN	LSU	MSU	MIZZ	MISS	SCAR	TENN	TAMU	VAN	Team	Div	SR	SW
ALA	13–17		2–1	1–2	.	0–3	0–3	2–1	1–2	.	2–1	2–1	2–1	1–2	.	ALA	W4	5–5	0–2
ARK	20–10	1–2		2–1	2–1	.	1–2	3–0	2–1	3–0	3–0	2–1	.	1–2	.	ARK	W1	7–3	3–0
AUB	8–22	2–1	1–2		.	.	0–3	1–2	0–3	2–1	1–2	.	1–2	0–3	0–3	AUB	W7	2–8	0–4
FLA	13–17	.	1–2	.		2–1	1–2	2–1	2–1	0–3	.	1–2	1–2	2–1	1–2	FLA	E5	4–6	0–1
UGA	17–13	3–0	.	.	1–2		0–3	.	1–2	2–1	2–1	3–0	1–2	1–2	3–0	UGA	E3	5–5	3–1
KEN	22–8	3–0	2–1	3–0	2–1	3–0		.	.	2–1	3–0	1–2	1–2	.	2–1	KEN	E2	8–2	4–0
LSU	13–17	1–2	0–3	2–1	1–2	.	.		1–2	2–1	3–0	.	0–3	2–1	1–2	LSU	W5	4–6	1–2
MSU	17–13	2–1	1–2	3–0	1–2	2–1	.	2–1		2–1	1–2	.		1–2	2–1	MSU	W3	6–4	1–0
MIZZ	9–21	.	0–3	1–2	3–0	1–2	1–2	1–2	1–2		.	1–2	0–3	.	0–3	MIZZ	E7	1–9	1–3
MISS	11–19	1–2	0–3	2–1	.	1–2	0–3	0–3	2–1	.		2–1	1–2	2–1	.	MISS	W6	4–6	0–3
SCAR	13–17	1–2	1–2	.	2–1	0–3	2–1	.	.	2–1	1–2		0–3	1–2	3–0	SCAR	E6	4–6	1–2
TENN	22–8	1–2	.	2–1	2–1	2–1	2–1	3–0	.	3–0	2–1	3–0		.	2–1	TENN	E1	9–1	3–0
TAMU	19–11	2–1	2–1	3–0	1–2	2–1	.	1–2	2–1	.	1–2	2–1	.		3–0	TAMU	W2	7–3	2–0
VAN	13–17	.	.	3–0	2–1	0–3	1–2	2–1	1–2	3–0	.	0–3	1–2	0–3		VAN	E4	4–6	2–3
Team	W–L	ALA	ARK	AUB	FLA	UGA	KEN	LSU	MSU	MIZZ	MISS	SCAR	TENN	TAMU	VAN	Team	Div	SR	SW

Updated for entire regular season. Tie Brkrs: TENN>KEN head to head. MSU>UGA head to head. ALA>VAN & FLA>SCAR & LSU TENN common. VAN>FLA head to head. SCAR>LSU ARK common. ARK SEC Tournament seed>KEN, ARK West champion.

== See also ==
- 2024 Mississippi State Bulldogs softball team
