= 2024 South Carolina Gamecocks baseball team =

American college baseball season

2024 South Carolina Gamecocks baseball

Raleigh Regional, 1-2
- Conference: Southeastern Conference
- Eastern Division
- Record: 37–25 (13-17 SEC)
- Head coach: Mark Kingston (7th season)
- Assistant coaches: Monte Lee (2nd season); Scott Wingo (3rd season)
- Pitching coach: Matt Williams (1st season)
- Home stadium: Founders Park

Uniform
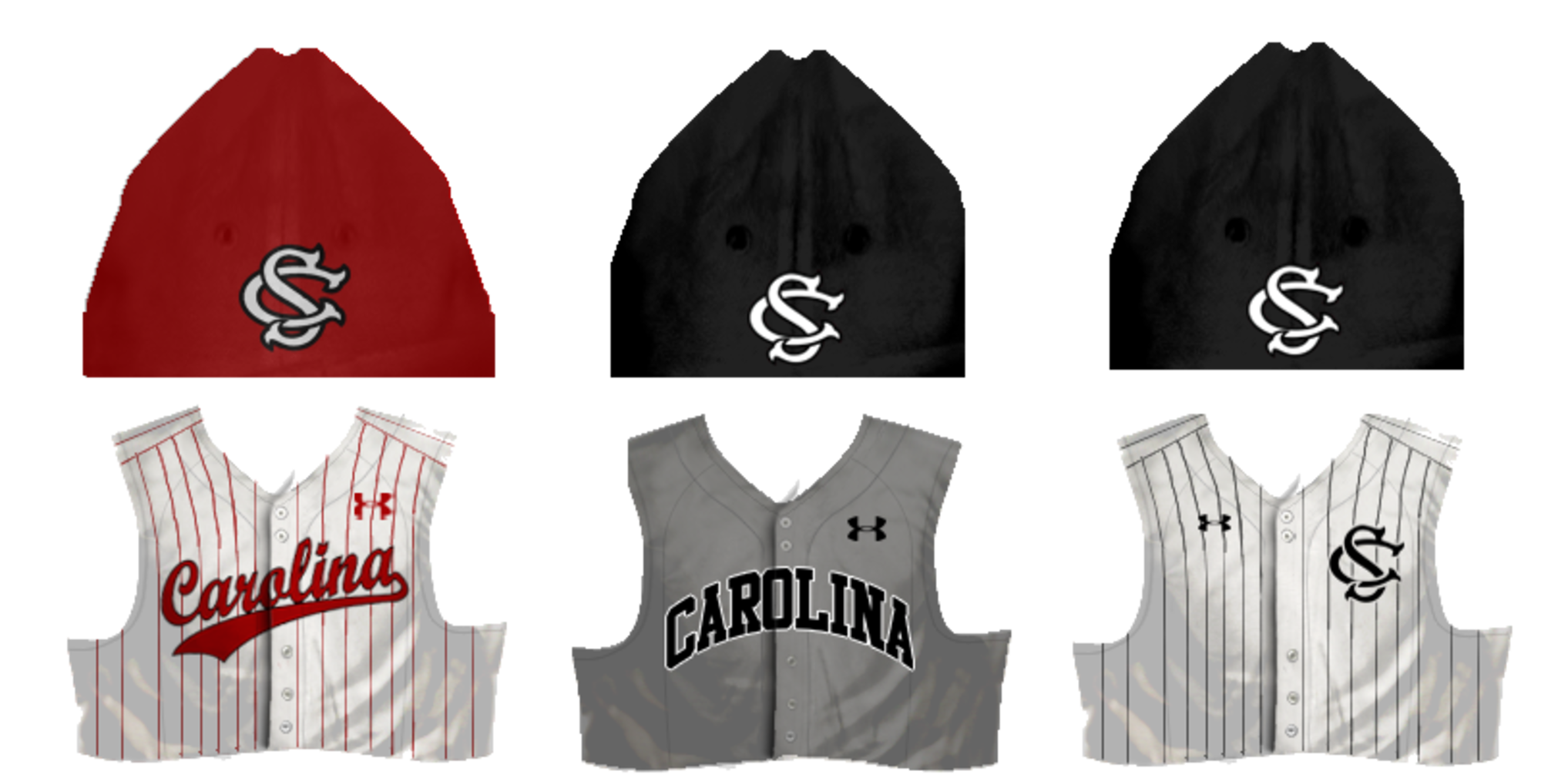

2024 Southeastern Conference baseball standings
	Conf.				Overall
Team	W		L	PCT	W		L	PCT
Eastern
No. 1 Tennessee ^{x}‍†‍‡‍^{y}	22	–	8	.733	60	–	13	.822
No. 3 Kentucky ^{x}‍†‍‍^{y}	22	–	8	.733	46	–	16	.742
No. 11 Georgia ‍‍‍^{y}	17	–	13	.567	43	–	17	.717
Vanderbilt ‍‍‍^{y}	13	–	17	.433	38	–	23	.623
No. 8 Florida ‍‍‍^{y}	13	–	17	.433	36	–	30	.545
South Carolina ‍‍‍^{y}	13	–	17	.433	37	–	25	.597
Missouri ‍‍‍	9	–	21	.300	23	–	32	.418
Western
No. 17 Arkansas ^{x}‍‍‍^{y}	20	–	10	.667	44	–	16	.733
No. 2 Texas A&M ‍‍‍^{y}	19	–	11	.633	53	–	15	.779
No. 22 Mississippi State ‍‍‍^{y}	17	–	13	.567	40	–	23	.635
Alabama ‍‍‍^{y}	13	–	17	.433	33	–	24	.579
LSU ‍‍‍^{y}	13	–	17	.433	43	–	23	.652
Ole Miss ‍‍‍	11	–	19	.367	27	–	29	.482
Auburn ‍‍‍	8	–	22	.267	27	–	26	.509
x – Division champion † – Conference champion ‡ – Tournament champion y – Invited to the NCAA Tournament; As of June 24, 2024; Rankings from D1Baseball

The 2024 South Carolina Gamecocks baseball team represented the University of South Carolina in the 2024 NCAA Division I baseball season. The 2024 season marked the Gamecocks' 131st overall. The Gamecocks played their home games at Founders Park, and were led by seventh year head coach Mark Kingston. The Gamecocks were eliminated in the Raleigh regional after going 1–2. Kingston was fired on June 3 after being eliminated from the NCAA Tournament.

== Previous season ==
The Gamecocks finished 42–21, 16–13 in the SEC and lost to the Florida Gators in the Gainesville supper regional.

== Offseason ==
=== Departures ===
South Carolina outgoing transfers
Player	Position	Year	New team	Ref
Thomas Powell	Outfielder	Freshman	North Greenville	
Jonathan French	Catcher	Junior	Houston	

=== Additions ===
South Carolina incoming transfers
Player	Position	Year	Previous team	Ref
Austin Brinling	Outfielder	Senior	North Florida	
Tyler Causey	Infielder	Senior	North Carolina	
Tyler Dean	Pitcher	Junior	Virginia Tech	
Garrett Gainey	Pitcher	Senior	Liberty	
Ty Good	Pitcher	Senior	Charleston	
Blake Jackson	Outfielder	Junior	Charlotte	
Kennedy Jones	Outfielder	Junior	UNC Greensboro	
Parker Noland	Infielder	Senior	Vanderbilt	
Dalton Reeves	Catcher	Senior	Presbyterian	

=== 2023 MLB draft ===
Seven South Carolina players were drafted in the 2023 MLB draft.

Round	Pick	Player	Position	MLB Team
3	77	Jack Mahoney	RHP	Colorado Rockies
4	113	Will Sanders	RHP	Chicago Cubs
4	115	Matt Duffy	RHP	Boston Red Sox
7	216	Noah Hall	RHP	New York Mets
8	232	Braylen Wimmer	SS	Colorado Rockies
13	404	James Hicks	RHP	Houston Astros
19	582	Cade Austin	RHP	New York Yankees

== Preseason ==
=== Preseason SEC awards and honors ===
The Gamecocks had two players named to SEC preseason teams.

Preseason All-SEC First Team
Player	No.	Position	Class
Cole Messina	19	C	Junior
Ethan Petry	20	RF	Sophomore

=== Coaches poll ===
The SEC baseball coaches' poll was released on February 8, 2024. South Carolina was picked to finish fourth in the SEC Eastern division.

SEC East Coaches' Poll
Predicted finish	Team	Points
1	Florida	88 (11)
2	Tennessee	75 (2)
3	Vanderbilt	73 (1)
4	South Carolina	50
5	Kentucky	44
6	Georgia	36
7	Missouri	19

== Personnel ==
=== Roster ===
2024 South Carolina Gamecocks baseball team
Players
Coaches

#	Pos.	Name	B/T	Height	Weight	Year	Home town
2	RHP	Roman Kimball	R/R	5 ft 11 in (1.8 m)	185 lb (84 kg)	So	New Hartford, NY
3	INF	Lee Ellis	R/R	5 ft 11 in (1.8 m)	170 lb (77 kg)	Fr	White Plains, MD
4	LHP	Jackson Phipps	L/L	6 ft 4 in (1.93 m)	225 lb (102 kg)	Jr	Dallas, GA
5	C	Talmadge LeCroy	R/R	6 ft 2 in (1.88 m)	205 lb (93 kg)	Jr	Belton, SC
6	OF	Blake Jackson	R/R	6 ft 0 in (1.83 m)	195 lb (88 kg)	Gr	Coppell, TX
7	OF	Kennedy Jones	R/R	6 ft 1 in (1.85 m)	220 lb (100 kg)	Jr	Norfolk, VA
8	OF	Austin Brinling	L/L	5 ft 8 in (1.73 m)	180 lb (82 kg)	Sr	Bradenton, FL
9	OF	Evan Stone	R/R	6 ft 0 in (1.83 m)	185 lb (84 kg)	So	Irmo, SC
10	OF	Dylan Brewer	L/L	6 ft 2 in (1.88 m)	180 lb (82 kg)	Sr	Latta, SC
11	INF	Parker Noland	L/R	6 ft 1 in (1.85 m)	208 lb (94 kg)	Sr	Knoxville, TN
12	INF	Tyler Causey	L/R	6 ft 6 in (1.98 m)	220 lb (100 kg)	Sr	Fort Mill, SC
13	INF	Will Tippet	S/R	6 ft 1 in (1.85 m)	175 lb (79 kg)	Fr	Stone Mountain, GA
14	RHP	Eli Jones	R/R	6 ft 1 in (1.85 m)	200 lb (91 kg)	Jr	Peachtree City, GA
15	INF	Carson Hornung	L/R	6 ft 3 in (1.91 m)	225 lb (102 kg)	Jr	Overland Park, KS
16	RHP	Dylan Eskew	R/R	6 ft 3 in (1.91 m)	200 lb (91 kg)	Jr	Tampa, FL
18	RHP	Eli Jerzembeck	R/R	6 ft 2 in (1.88 m)	185 lb (84 kg)	So	Charlotte, NC
19	C	Cole Messina	R/R	6 ft 0 in (1.83 m)	230 lb (104 kg)	Jr	Summerville, SC
20	INF	Ethan Petry	L/R	6 ft 4 in (1.93 m)	230 lb (104 kg)	So	Land o' Lakes, FL
21	C	Ryan Bakes	R/R	5 ft 10 in (1.78 m)	190 lb (86 kg)	Fr	Algonquin, IL
22	RHP	Ricky Williams	R/R	6 ft 2 in (1.88 m)	200 lb (91 kg)	Jr	Lexington, SC
23	LHP	Jake McCoy	L/L	6 ft 1 in (1.85 m)	185 lb (84 kg)	Fr	Fort Mill, SC
24	RHP	Ty Good	R/R	6 ft 2 in (1.88 m)	190 lb (86 kg)	Sr	Rock Hill, SC
25	RHP	Sam Simpson	R/R	6 ft 3 in (1.91 m)	180 lb (82 kg)	So	Carrollton, GA
26	INF	Jordan Carrion	R/R	6 ft 1 in (1.85 m)	162 lb (73 kg)	Sr	Miami, FL
27	INF	Tyler Zedalis	R/R	6 ft 2 in (1.88 m)	220 lb (100 kg)	Fr	Charlotte, NC
28	RHP	Austin Williamson	R/R	6 ft 4 in (1.93 m)	220 lb (100 kg)	So	Sherrills Ford, NC
29	LHP	Matthew Becker	R/L	6 ft 3 in (1.91 m)	200 lb (91 kg)	Jr	Chapin, SC
36	INF	Tristan Salinas	L/R	6 ft 2 in (1.88 m)	200 lb (91 kg)	Fr	Boone, NC
37	RHP	Chris Veach	R/R	6 ft 0 in (1.83 m)	195 lb (88 kg)	Jr	Chapin, SC
39	RHP	Joey Wittig	R/R	5 ft 11 in (1.8 m)	175 lb (79 kg)	Fr	San Diego, CA
40	LHP	Garrett Gainey	L/L	6 ft 1 in (1.85 m)	200 lb (91 kg)	Sr	Hartsville, SC
44	C	Dalton Reeves	L/R	6 ft 5 in (1.96 m)	215 lb (98 kg)	Sr	Lugoff, SC
45	LHP	Jevarra Martin	L/L	6 ft 7 in (2.01 m)	220 lb (100 kg)	Fr	Covington, GA
46	LHP	Xavier Pelzer	R/L	6 ft 3 in (1.91 m)	200 lb (91 kg)	Fr	Cayce, SC
47	RHP	Connor McCreery	R/R	6 ft 6 in (1.98 m)	215 lb (98 kg)	So	Williston Park, NY
48	RHP	Parker Marlatt	R/R	6 ft 1 in (1.85 m)	200 lb (91 kg)	Fr	Dacula, GA
49	RHP	Tyler Dean	R/R	6 ft 3 in (1.91 m)	195 lb (88 kg)	Jr	Vinton, VA
52	INF	Gavin Casas	L/R	6 ft 4 in (1.93 m)	230 lb (104 kg)	Jr	Pembroke Pines, FL
53	RHP	Reese Marcum	R/R	6 ft 1 in (1.85 m)	200 lb (91 kg)	Fr	Lexington, SC

Head coach

Mark Kingston

Assistant coach(es)

Monte Lee
Scott Wingo
Matt Williams

Legend

- (C) Team captain
- (S) Suspended
- (I) Ineligible
- Injured
- Current redshirt

Roster

=== Coaching staff ===
2024 South Carolina Gamecocks baseball coaching staff
- Mark Kingston – Head coach – 7th year
- Monte Lee – Assistant coach – 2nd year
- Scott Wingo – Assistant coach – 3rd year
- Matt Williams – Pitching Coach – 1st year
- Mike Current – Player Development – 7th year
- Ryan West – Director of Operations – 2nd year
- LT Tolbert – Student assistant coach – 1st year

=== Opening Day lineup ===
Opening Day Starters
Name	Position
Blake Jackson	Left Field
Parker Noland	Second Base
Ethan Petry	Right field
Cole Messina	Catcher
Talmadge LeCroy	Third base
Gavin Casas	First base
Tyler Causey	Designated Hitter
Dylan Brewer	Center field
Will Tippett	Shortstop

== Schedule and results ==
2024 South Carolina Gamecocks baseball game log
Regular season (33–20)

February (8–1)
Date	Opponent	Rank	Site/stadium	Score	Win	Loss	Save	TV	Attendance	Overall record	SEC record
February 16	Miami (OH)	#25	Founders Park; Columbia, SC	5-1	**Jones (1–0)**	Manstrain IV (0–1)	**Gainey (1)**	SECN+	8,242	1–0	
February 17	Miami (OH)	#25	Founders Park	11-4	**Eskew (1–0)**	Galdoni (0–1)	None	SECN+	7,620	2–0	
February 18	Miami (OH)	#25	Founders Park	14-0^{7}	**Kimball (1–0)**	Olejnik (0–1)	None	SECN+	6,865	3–0	
February 20	Winthrop	#21	Founders Park	12-2^{7}	**Good (1–0)**	Houston (0–1)	None	SECN+	6,524	4–0	
February 21	Queens	#21	Founders Park	13-3^{8}	**Becker (1–0)**	Ruller (0–1)	None	SECN+	6,412	5–0	
February 23	Belmont	#21	Founders Park	8-1	**Pitzer (1–0)**	Pryor (1–1)	None	SECN+	7,108	6–0	
February 24	Belmont	#21	Founders Park	2-11	Timbes (2–0)	**Eskew (1–1)**	None	SECN+	8,242	6-1	
February 25	Belmont	#21	Founders Park	12-1	**Becker (2–0)**	Borders (0–2)	None	SECN+	6,730	7-1	
February 27	Gardner-Webb	#19	Founders Park	7-1	**Cooper (1–0)**	Clemente (0–1)	None	SECN+	6,315	8-1	

March (13–6)
Date	Opponent	Rank	Site/stadium	Score	Win	Loss	Save	TV	Attendance	Overall record	SEC record
March 1	#10 Clemson	#19	Founders Park	canceled-rain				ACCNX			
March 2	vs. #10 Clemson	#19	Segra Park; Columbia, SC	4-5^{12}	Marchal (2–0)	**Gainey (0–1)**	None	ACCNX	9,284	8-2	
March 3	at #10 Clemson	#19	Doug Kingsmore Stadium; Clemson, SC	4-5	Titsworth (1–0)	**Kimball (1–1)**	Gordon (1)	ACCNX	6,124	8-3	
March 5	The Citadel	#21	Founders Park	7–1	**Marlatt (1–0)**	Paulsen (1–1)	None	SECN+	6,523	9-3	
March 6	Davidson	#21	Founders Park	4–1^{6}	**Pitzer (2–0)**	Fix (2–1)	**Good (1)**	SECN+	6,012	10-3	
March 8	Longwood	#21	Founders Park	10-0^{8}	**Jones (2–0)**	Fisher, B (1–1)	None	SECN+	6,360	11-3	
March 9	Longwood	#21	Founders Park	10-2	**Eskew (2–1)**	Hairfield, D (1–2)	None	SECN+	6,712	12-3	
March 10	Longwood	#20	Founders Park	22-6^{7}	**McCreery (1–0)**	Potojecki, J (0–2)	None	SECN+	6,415	13-3	
March 12	Georgia State	#20	SRP Park; North Augusta, SC	4-3	**Becker (3–0)**	Garmon, B (0–1)	**Gainey (2)**	SECN+	3,526	14-3	
March 15	at Ole Miss	#20	Swayze Field; Oxford, Mississippi	4-5	Murrell (1–0)	**Veach (0–1)**	Spencer (4)	SECN+	8,941	14-4	0–1
March 16	at Ole Miss	#20	Swayze Field	3-12	Doyle (2–0)	**Eskew** (2–2)	None	SECN+	9,468	14-5	0–2
March 17	at Ole Miss	#20	Swayze Field	6-2	**Becker (4–0)**	Saunier (3–2)	None	SECN+	9,255	15-5	1–2
March 19	vs. USC Upstate		Fluor Field; Greenville, SC	14-8	**Pitzer** (3–0)	Kuzkie (0–1)	None	ESPN+	1,842	16–5	
March 23	#3 Vanderbilt		Founders Park	8-4	**Veach (1–1)**	Green (0–2)	**Gainey (3)**	SECN+	7,712	17-5	2-2
March 23	#3 Vanderbilt		Founders Park	8–3	**Good (2–0)**	Cunningham (3–1)	**Gainey (4)**	SECN+	8,242	18-5	3–2
March 24	#3 Vanderbilt		Founders Park	10-2	**Pitzer (4–0)**	Futrell (2–1)	None	SECN+	7,133	19-5	4–2
March 26	Presbyterian	#18	Founders Park	19-14	**Good (3–0)**	McGregor (3–2)	None	SECN+	6,912	20–5	
March 28	at #16 Alabama	#18	Sewell–Thomas Stadium; Tuscaloosa, Alabama	3-4	Davis (2–1)	**Gainey (0–2)**	None	SECN+	3,470	20-6	4–3
March 29	at #16 Alabama	#18	Sewell–Thomas Stadium	6–13	George (1–0)	**Becker (4–1)**	None	SECN+	4,723	20-7	4-4
March 30	at #16 Alabama	#18	Sewell–Thomas Stadium	9-8	**Good (4–0)**	Fay (1–1)	**Veach (1)**	SECN+	4,536	21-7	5–4

April (8-7)
Date	Opponent	Rank	Site/stadium	Score	Win	Loss	Save	TV	Attendance	Overall record	SEC record
April 3	Georgia Southern	#22	Founders	0-8	Fisher (5–2)	**Copper (1–1)**	None	SECN	12,357	21-8	
April 5	#3 Texas A&M	#22	Founders Park	2-9	Prager	**Jones (2–1)**	None	SECN+	7,159	21-9	5-5
April 6	#3 Texas A&M	#22	Founders Park	3-6	Sdao (2–0)	**Pitzer (4–1)**	Aschenbeck (4)	SECN+	8,242	21-10	5-6
April 7	#3 Texas A&M	#22	Founders Park	6-5	**Veach (2–1)**	Lamkin (2–1)	**Gainey (5)**	SECN+	6,720	22-10	6-6
April 9	#13 North Carolina		Truist Field; Charlotte, NC	2-1	**McCreery (2-0)**	Matthijs (11-2)	None	ACCNX	4,092	23-10	
April 12	at #24 Florida		Condron Ballpark; Gainesville, Florida	10-3	**Jones (3–1)**	Neely (1–1)	**Veach (2)**	SECN+	7,869	24-10	7-6
April 13	#24 Florida		Condron Ballpark	9-8	**Kimball (2–1)**	Coppola (0–1)	**Pitzer (1)**	SECN+	8,109	25-10	8-6
April 14	at #24 Florida		Condron Ballpark	9-11	Caglianone (5–1)	**Becker (4–2)**	None	SECN+	5,772	25-11	8-7
April 16	at The Citadel	#20	Joseph P. Riley Jr. Park; Charleston, SC	4–3	**Marlatt (2-0)**	Cummiskey (2–4)	**Gainey (6)**	ESPN+	6,231	26-11	
April 19	#2 Arkansas	#20	Founders Park	1-2	Smith, H. (8-0)	**Good (4–1)**	Hewlett (4)	SECN+	8,242	26-12	8-8
April 20	#2 Arkansas	#20	Founders Park	6-3	**Becker (5–2)**	Molina (3–1)	**McCreery (1)**	SECN+	7,207	27-12	9-8
April 20	#2 Arkansas	#20	Founders Park	6-9	Tygart (4–1)	**Eskew(2–3)**	None	SECN+	6,719	27-13	9-9
April 26	#4 Kentucky	#24	Founders Park	6-5^{10}	**Veach (3–1)**	Byers (3–1)	None	SECN+	7,467	28-13	10-9
April 27	#4 Kentucky	#24	Founders Park	13–15	Robinson (2–0)	**Jones (3–2)**	Hagenow (1)	SECN+	7,512	28-14	10-10
April 28	#4 Kentucky	#24	Founders Park	10-0^{7}	**Eskew (3–3)**	Moore (7-1)	None	SECN+	7,484	29-14	11-10

May (4-7)
Date	Opponent	Rank	Site/stadium	Score	Win	Loss	Save	TV	Attendance	Overall record	SEC record
May 1	East Tennessee State	#15	Founders Park	15-2^{7}	**McCoy (1–0)**	Engert (0–2)	None	SECN	6,734	30-14	
May 3	at Missouri	#15	Taylor Stadium; Columbia, Missouri	10-2	**Good (5–1)**	Lunceford, H. (1-5)	None	SECN+	1,302	31-14	12-10
May 4	at Missouri	#15	Taylor Stadium	3-8	Rustad, C. (5–6)	**Jones (3–3)**	None	SECN+	1,738	31-15	12-11
May 5	at Missouri	#15	Taylor Stadium	9-4	**McCreery (3–0)**	Mayer, B. (1–6)	**Veach (3)**	SECN	1,385	32–15	13–11
May 7	Winthrop	#13	Winthrop Ballpark; Rock Hill, SC	15-3^{7}	**Dean (1–0)**	Harris, C. (0-1)	None	SECN+	2,004	33-15	
May 9	#15 Georgia	#13	Founders Park	10-14	Smith (8–2)	**Kimball (2–2)**	None	SECN+	7,033	33–16	13–12
May 10	#15 Georgia	#13	Founders Park	5-11	Finley (5–1)	**Jones (3–4)**	Zeldin, B. (6)	SECN+	7,630	33-17	13-13
May 11	at #15 Georgia	#13	Founders Park	14-6	Roberge, J. (3–1)	**Eskew (3–4)**	None	SECN+	7,912	33-17	13-14
May 16	#1 Tennessee	#24	Lindsey Nelson Stadium; Knoxville, TN	3-9	Causey, A. (10–3)	**Good (5–2)**	None	SECN+	5,730	33-18	13–15
May 17	#1 Tennessee	#24	Lindsey Nelson Stadium	3-8	Beam, D.(8-2)	**Gainey (0–3)**	None	SECN+	5,657	33–19	13–16
May 18	#1 Tennessee	#24	Lindsey Nelson Stadium	1–4	Sechrist, Z. (2–1)	**Becker (5–3)**	Combs, A. (4)	SECN	5,759	33–20	13–17

Postseason

SEC Tournament
Date	Opponent	Seed	Site/stadium	Score	Win	Loss	Save	TV	Attendance	Overall record	SECT Record
May 21	v. No. 7 (SEC) Alabama	No. 10 (SEC)	Hoover Metropolitan Stadium; Hoover, AL	10-5	**Veach (4–1)**	Moza (3–3)	None	SEC Network	7,425	34–20	1–0
May 22	v. #5 / 2 (SEC) Arkansas	No. 10 (SEC)	Hoover Metropolitan Stadium	6-5	**Gainey (1–3)**	Gaeckle (3–3)	None	SEC Network	7,185	35–20	2-0
May 23	v. No. 11 (SEC) LSU	No. 10 (SEC)	Hoover Metropolitan Stadium	11-10	Ulla (2–1)	**Veach (4–2)**	None	SEC Network		35–21	2-1
May 24	v. #2 / No. 3 (SEC) Kentucky	No. 10 (SEC)	Hoover Metropolitan Stadium	6-5	**Marlatt (3–0)**	Moore (8–3)	**Becker (1)**	SEC Network		36–21	3-1
May 25	v. No. 11 (SEC) LSU	No. 10 (SEC)	Hoover Metropolitan Stadium	12-11^{10}	Herring (4–1)	**Gainey (1–4)**	None	SEC Network		36–22	3-2

NCAA Raleigh Regional
Date	Opponent	Seed	Site/stadium	Score	Win	Loss	Save	TV	Attendance	Overall record	NCAAT record
May 31	v. No. 3 James Madison	No. 2	Doak Field; Raleigh, NC	8-7^{10}	**Veach (5–2)**	Vogatsky (3–2)	None	ESPN+	2,763	37-22	1–0
June 1	v. NCAA #10 / No. 1 NC State	No. 2	Doak Field	4-6	Consiglio (5–4)	**McCreery (3–1)**	Smith (6)	ESPN+	(3,036	37–23	1–1
June 2	v. No. 3 James Madison	No. 2	Doak Field	0-2	Burke (7-2)	**Eskew (3–5)**	None	ESPN+	2,606	37–24	1-2

== Raleigh Regional ==
Raleigh Regional Teams
(1) NC State Wolfpack	(2) South Carolina Gamecocks	(3) James Madison Dukes	(4) Bryant Bulldogs

First Round
1	**NC State**	9
4	Bryant	2
2	**South Carolina**	8
3	James Madison	7^{10}
Lower round 1
4	Bryant	1
3	**James Madison**	8

Semi-Finals
1	**NC State**	6
2	South Carolina	4
Lower final
2	South Carolina	0
3	**James Madison**	2

Finals
1	**NC State**	5
3	James Madison	3

Legend: = Win = Loss = Canceled
Bold = South Carolina team member
Rankings are based on the team's current ranking in the D1Baseball poll.

|}

== Record vs. conference opponents ==
Last two did not qualify for conf. tourn. Blank are not scheduled. Blue are home games, otherwise away.

2024 SEC baseball records Source: 2024 SEC baseball game results, 2024 SEC baseball schedule
Team	W–L	ALA	ARK	AUB	FLA	UGA	KEN	LSU	MSU	MIZZ	MISS	SCAR	TENN	TAMU	VAN	Team	Div	SR	SW
ALA	13–17		2–1	1–2	.	0–3	0–3	2–1	1–2	.	2–1	2–1	2–1	1–2	.	ALA	W4	5–5	0–2
ARK	20–10	1–2		2–1	2–1	.	1–2	3–0	2–1	3–0	3–0	2–1	.	1–2	.	ARK	W1	7–3	3–0
AUB	8–22	2–1	1–2		.	.	0–3	1–2	0–3	2–1	1–2	.	1–2	0–3	0–3	AUB	W7	2–8	0–4
FLA	13–17	.	1–2	.		2–1	1–2	2–1	2–1	0–3	.	1–2	1–2	2–1	1–2	FLA	E5	4–6	0–1
UGA	17–13	3–0	.	.	1–2		0–3	.	1–2	2–1	2–1	3–0	1–2	1–2	3–0	UGA	E3	5–5	3–1
KEN	22–8	3–0	2–1	3–0	2–1	3–0		.	.	2–1	3–0	1–2	1–2	.	2–1	KEN	E2	8–2	4–0
LSU	13–17	1–2	0–3	2–1	1–2	.	.		1–2	2–1	3–0	.	0–3	2–1	1–2	LSU	W5	4–6	1–2
MSU	17–13	2–1	1–2	3–0	1–2	2–1	.	2–1		2–1	1–2	.		1–2	2–1	MSU	W3	6–4	1–0
MIZZ	9–21	.	0–3	1–2	3–0	1–2	1–2	1–2	1–2		.	1–2	0–3	.	0–3	MIZZ	E7	1–9	1–3
MISS	11–19	1–2	0–3	2–1	.	1–2	0–3	0–3	2–1	.		2–1	1–2	2–1	.	MISS	W6	4–6	0–3
SCAR	13–17	1–2	1–2	.	2–1	0–3	2–1	.	.	2–1	1–2		0–3	1–2	3–0	SCAR	E6	4–6	1–2
TENN	22–8	1–2	.	2–1	2–1	2–1	2–1	3–0	.	3–0	2–1	3–0		.	2–1	TENN	E1	9–1	3–0
TAMU	19–11	2–1	2–1	3–0	1–2	2–1	.	1–2	2–1	.	1–2	2–1	.		3–0	TAMU	W2	7–3	2–0
VAN	13–17	.	.	3–0	2–1	0–3	1–2	2–1	1–2	3–0	.	0–3	1–2	0–3		VAN	E4	4–6	2–3
Team	W–L	ALA	ARK	AUB	FLA	UGA	KEN	LSU	MSU	MIZZ	MISS	SCAR	TENN	TAMU	VAN	Team	Div	SR	SW

Updated for entire regular season. Tie Brkrs: TENN>KEN head to head. MSU>UGA head to head. ALA>VAN & FLA>SCAR & LSU TENN common. VAN>FLA head to head. SCAR>LSU ARK common. ARK SEC Tournament seed>KEN, ARK West champion.

== Rankings ==
Ranking movements Legend: ██ Increase in ranking ██ Decrease in ranking — = Not ranked
	Week																
Poll	Pre	1	2	3	4	5	6	7	8	9	10	11	12	13	14	15	Final
Coaches'	16	16*	16	21	20	—	14	19	—	21	21	14	14	23	—	—	
Baseball America	12	12	12	13	12	21	10	15	25	19	22	18	16	—	—	—	
NCBWA†	15	16	17	23	21	25	16	20	—	21	20	15	14	24	—	—	
D1Baseball	25	21	19	21	20	—	18	22	—	20	24	15	13	24	—	—	
Perfect Game	13	12	13	18	18	—	18	23	—	—	—	21	16	—	—	—	

† NCBWA ranks 30 teams in their preseason poll, but only ranks 25 teams weekly during the season.
* A new poll was not released for this week, so for comparison purposes, the previous week's ranking is inserted in this week's slot.

== See also ==
- 2024 South Carolina Gamecocks softball team
