= Mark Kingston (baseball) =

American college baseball coach

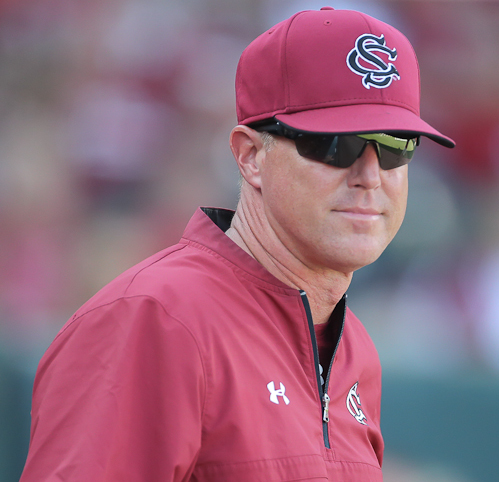

Current position
- Title: Head coach
- Team: Creighton
- Conference: Big East
- Record: 31–26 (.544)
- Annual salary: $600,000

Biographical details
- Born: May 16, 1970 (age 56); Buffalo, New York, U.S.

Playing career
- 1989–1992: North Carolina
- 1992: Helena Brewers
- 1993: Peoria Chiefs
- 1993: Geneva Cubs
- 1994: Daytona Cubs
- 1995: Orlando Cubs
- 1995: Daytona Cubs
- 1996: Orlando Cubs
- 1997: Grays Harbor Gulls

Coaching career (HC unless noted)
- 1999: Illinois State (Asst.)
- 2000–2001: Miami (FL) (Asst.)
- 2002–2008: Tulane (Asst.)
- 2009: Illinois State (Asst.)
- 2010–2014: Illinois State
- 2015–2017: South Florida
- 2018–2024: South Carolina
- 2025: Creighton (associate HC)
- 2026–present: Creighton

Head coaching record
- Overall: 521–361–1 (.591)
- Tournaments: NCAA: 12–14; American: 2–4; MVC: 13–6; SEC: 2–5; Big East 2–2

Accomplishments and honors

Awards
- 2× MVC Coach of the Year (2010, 2013)

Mark Kingston (born May 16, 1970) is an American college baseball coach who is currently the head coach at Creighton University. He was previously the head coach at the University of South Carolina, the University of South Florida and Illinois State University.

== Playing career ==
Kingston played high school baseball at Potomac High School in Dumfries, Virginia where he was a Collegiate Baseball Top 50 recruit, and was drafted out of high school by the New York Yankees in the 35th round of the 1988 MLB draft. Choosing instead to play college ball at North Carolina, he played four seasons, helping the team to an Atlantic Coast Conference regular season title and berth in the 1989 College World Series in his freshman year. He was drafted in the 45th round of the 1992 MLB draft by the Milwaukee Brewers. After playing rookie ball in the Brewers organization, he played four additional seasons in the Chicago Cubs organization, reaching Class-AA, and one season with the independent league Grays Harbor Gulls.

== Coaching career ==
After his playing days were over, Kingston was hired as an assistant coach at Purdue. He was promoted to the top assistant position after two seasons, and then served one year at Illinois State. He then served two seasons at Miami (FL), where he helped guide the team to the 2001 College World Series title, produced two All-Americans, and saw 18 players sign professional contracts. He then moved to Tulane as recruiting coordinator, where six of his seven classes were ranked in the Top 25 nationally by Collegiate Baseball. The Green Wave reached the 2005 College World Series as the top seed, and earned academic honors in Omaha. In 2009, Kingston served as associate head coach at Illinois State before being elevated to the top job the following season.

Kingston was named the head coach at South Florida ahead of the 2015 season. Kingston coached at USF from 2015 to 2017 and led the Bulls to a pair of NCAA Regional appearances.

On June 30, 2017, Kingston was named the head baseball coach at South Carolina, becoming the 30th head coach in program history. Despite inheriting a team that failed to reach the postseason the year before, Kingston led the Gamecocks to an NCAA Regional crown and an NCAA Super Regional appearance in his first year at the helm. Kingston was relieved of his head coaching position on June 3, 2024.

On June 17, 2024, Kingston was named the associate head coach/head coach in waiting for Creighton. He will serve under Ed Servais, who will be going into his 22nd and final season as head coach of the Bluejays in 2025.

== Head coaching record ==
Record table
Season	Team	Overall	Conference	Standing	Postseason
Illinois State Redbirds (Missouri Valley Conference) (2010–2014)
2010	Illinois State	32–24 (.571)	15–6 (.714)	T–1st	Louisville Regional
2011	Illinois State	36–18 (.667)	13–8 (.619)	3rd	
2012	Illinois State	33–19 (.635)	10–9 (.526)	4th	
2013	Illinois State	39–19 (.672)	16–5 (.762)	1st	
2014	Illinois State	33–22 (.600)	10–11 (.476)	5th	
Illinois State:		173–102 (.629)	64–39 (.621)		
South Florida Bulls (American Athletic Conference) (2015–2017)
2015	South Florida	34–26–1 (.566)	13–11 (.542)	T–3rd	Gainesville Regional
2016	South Florida	24–33 (.421)	8–16 (.333)	T–7th	
2017	South Florida	42–19 (.689)	14–10 (.583)	T–3rd	Gainesville Regional
South Florida:		100–78–1 (.561)	35–37 (.486)		
South Carolina (Southeastern Conference) (2018–2024)
2018	South Carolina	37–26 (.587)	17–13 (.567)	3rd (East)	Fayetteville Super Regional
2019	South Carolina	28–28 (.500)	8–22 (.267)	5th (East)	
2020	South Carolina	12–4 (.750)	0–0 (.000)	(East)	Season canceled due to COVID-19
2021	South Carolina	34–23 (.596)	16–14 (.533)	4th (East)	Columbia Regional
2022	South Carolina	27–28 (.491)	13–17 (.433)	5th (East)	
2023	South Carolina	42–21 (.667)	16–13 (.552)	3rd (East)	Gainesville Super Regional
2024	South Carolina	37–25 (.597)	13–17 (.433)	5th (East)	Raleigh Regional
South Carolina:		217–155 (.583)	83–96 (.464)		
Creighton Bluejays (Big East Conference) (2026–present)
2026	Creighton	31–26 (.544)	13–8 (.619)	4th	Big East Tournament
Creighton:		31–26 (.544)	13–8 (.619)		
Total:		521–361–1 (.591)			
National champion Postseason invitational champion Conference regular season champion Conference regular season and conference tournament champion Division regular season champion Division regular season and conference tournament champion Conference tournament champion

== See also ==
- List of current NCAA Division I baseball coaches
