= Lohman, Missouri =

- City
- City of Lohman
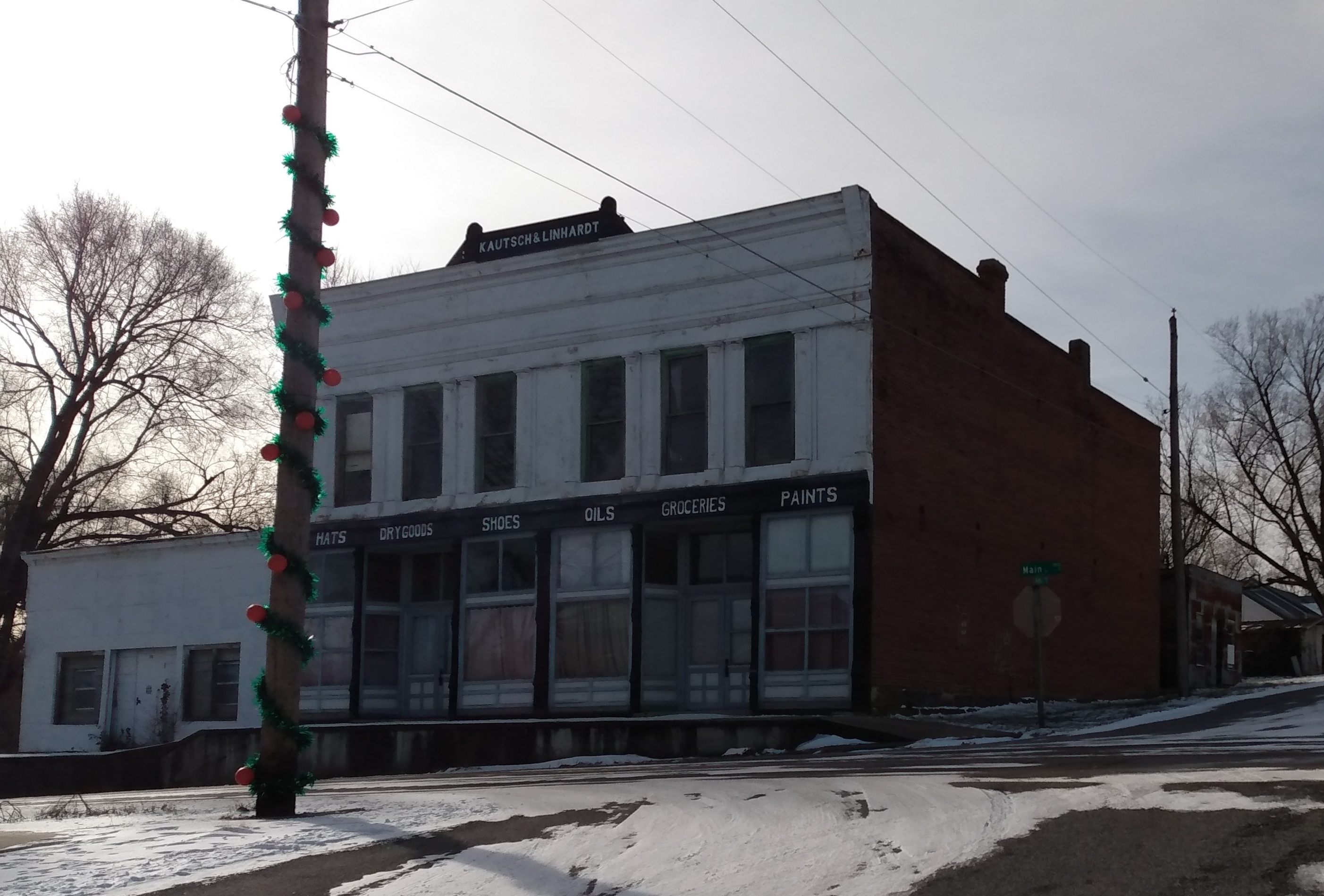
- Storefront in Lohman, Missouri

- Location of Lohman, Missouri
- Coordinates: 38°32′34″N 92°21′53″W
- Country: United States
- State: Missouri
- County: Cole
- Incorporated: 1882
- Named for: C. W. Lohman

Government
  - Mayor: Cody Mortensen

Area
  - Total: 0.36 sq mi (0.93 km^{2})
  - Land: 0.36 sq mi (0.93 km^{2})
  - Water: 0 sq mi (0.00 km^{2})
- Elevation: 676 ft (206 m)

Population (2020)
  - Total: 175
  - Density: 485.8/sq mi (187.55/km^{2})
- Time zone: UTC-6 (Central (CST))
  - Summer (DST): UTC-5 (CDT)
- ZIP code: 65053
- Area code: 573
- FIPS code: 29-43652
- GNIS feature ID: 2395747

Lohman is a city in Cole County, Missouri, United States. The population was 175 at the 2020 census. It is part of the Jefferson City, Missouri Metropolitan Statistical Area.

== History ==
A post office called Lohman has been in operation since 1882. The city was named after C. W. Lohman, a local merchant.

== Geography ==
According to the United States Census Bureau, the city has a total area of 0.36 square miles (0.93 km^{2}), all land.

== Demographics ==
Historical population
Census	Pop.	Note	%±
1920	120		—
1930	107		−10.8%
1940	100		−6.5%
1950	123		23.0%
1960	128		4.1%
1970	109		−14.8%
1980	168		54.1%
1990	154		−8.3%
2000	168		9.1%
2010	163		−3.0%
2020	175		7.4%
U.S. Decennial Census

=== 2010 census ===
As of the census of 2010, there were 163 people, 64 households, and 52 families residing in the city. The population density was 452.8 inhabitants per square mile (174.8/km^{2}). There were 79 housing units at an average density of 219.4 per square mile (84.7/km^{2}). The racial makeup of the city was 97.5% White and 2.5% from two or more races.

There were 64 households, of which 26.6% had children under the age of 18 living with them, 70.3% were married couples living together, 4.7% had a female householder with no husband present, 6.3% had a male householder with no wife present, and 18.8% were non-families. 17.2% of all households were made up of individuals, and 7.8% had someone living alone who was 65 years of age or older. The average household size was 2.55 and the average family size was 2.85.

The median age in the city was 42.6 years. 20.2% of residents were under the age of 18; 8.7% were between the ages of 18 and 24; 25.8% were from 25 to 44; 30.1% were from 45 to 64; and 15.3% were 65 years of age or older. The gender makeup of the city was 52.8% male and 47.2% female.

=== 2000 census ===
As of the census of 2000, there were 168 people, 60 households, and 52 families residing in the city. The population density was 376.0 inhabitants per square mile (145.2/km^{2}). There were 68 housing units at an average density of 152.2 per square mile (58.8/km^{2}). The racial makeup of the city was 100.00% White.

There were 60 households, out of which 36.7% had children under the age of 18 living with them, 78.3% were married couples living together, and 13.3% were non-families. 13.3% of all households were made up of individuals, and 5.0% had someone living alone who was 65 years of age or older. The average household size was 2.80 and the average family size was 3.08.

In the village the population was spread out, with 24.4% under the age of 18, 8.9% from 18 to 24, 25.6% from 25 to 44, 26.2% from 45 to 64, and 14.9% who were 65 years of age or older. The median age was 40 years. For every 100 females, there were 118.2 males. For every 100 females age 18 and over, there were 111.7 males.

The median income for a household in the city was $54,583, and the median income for a family was $59,375. Males had a median income of $35,000 versus $21,042 for females. The per capita income for the city was $22,666. About 5.1% of families and 3.7% of the population were below the poverty line, including 6.0% of those under the age of eighteen and none of those 65 or over.

== Education ==
It is in the Cole County R-I School District.
