= Jake Brown (baseball, born 2005) =

American baseball player (born 2005)

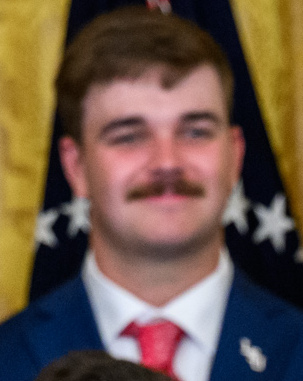
- Brown in 2025

Seattle Mariners
- Outfielder
- Born: January 12, 2005 (age 21); Lake Charles, Louisiana
- Bats: Left Throws: Left

Jake Cannon Brown (born January 12, 2005) is an American professional baseball outfielder in the Seattle Mariners organization.

== Amateur career ==
Brown attended Sulphur High School in Sulphur, Louisiana. In the summer of 2022, he won a gold medal at the 2022 U-18 Baseball World Cup as part of the US National U18 baseball team. As a senior in 2023, he batted .336 with seven home runs alongside pitching to a 1.71 ERA, being awarded Louisiana Gatorade Baseball Player of the Year. The Texas Rangers selected him in the 16th round of the 2023 Major League Baseball (MLB) draft but he did not sign and instead enrolled at Louisiana State University (LSU) to play college baseball for the LSU Tigers.

As a freshman for LSU in 2024, Brown played in 56 games and hit .264 with four home runs and 13 runs batted in (RBI) across 91 at bats. After the season, he played collegiate summer baseball in the Cape Cod Baseball League with the Yarmouth–Dennis Red Sox. In 2025, his sophomore season, Brown played in 64 games and batted .320 with eight home runs, 48 RBI, and 11 stolen bases. He helped LSU win the 2025 College World Series as a result. As a junior in 2026, he hit three home runs in a win over Sacramento State University, tying LSU's single-game record. He played in 42 games during the season and hit .309 with 16 home runs and 49 RBI before suffering a broken hamate bone in his hand in May, ending his season prematurely. He was healthy for and participated in the MLB Draft Combine at Chase Field in June.

== Professional career ==
Brown was selected by the Seattle Mariners in the second round with the 65th overall pick of the 2026 MLB draft. He signed with the Mariners for a $1.4 million signing bonus.

After signing, Brown made his professional debut with the Single-A Inland Empire 66ers. He played in 24 games and batted .313 with two home runs, 13 RBI, and seven stolen bases.
