= 2025 Atlantic Coast Conference baseball tournament =

American college baseball tournament

- Teams: 16
- Format: Single Elimination
- Finals site: Durham Bulls Athletic Park; Durham, North Carolina
- Champions: North Carolina (9th title)
- Winning coach: Scott Forbes (2nd title)
- MVP: Luke Stevenson (North Carolina)
- Attendance: 60,158
- Television: ACC Network

2025 Atlantic Coast Conference baseball standings
	Conf.				Overall
Team	W		L	PCT	W		L	PCT
No. 24 Georgia Tech ‍†‍‍^{y}	19	–	11	.633	41	–	19	.683
No. 10 Florida State ‍‍‍^{y}	17	–	10	.630	41	–	14	.745
No. 9 North Carolina ‍‍‡‍^{y}	18	–	11	.621	46	–	13	.780
NC State ‍‍‍^{y}	17	–	11	.607	35	–	21	.625
No. 23 Clemson ‍‍‍^{y}	18	–	12	.600	45	–	18	.714
Virginia ‍‍‍	16	–	11	.593	32	–	18	.640
No. 15 Duke ‍‍‍^{y}	17	–	13	.567	40	–	19	.678
Wake Forest ‍‍‍^{y}	16	–	14	.533	39	–	22	.639
No. 16 Miami (FL) ‍‍‍^{y}	15	–	14	.517	34	–	26	.567
No. 6 Louisville ‍‍‍^{y}	15	–	15	.500	39	–	21	.650
Notre Dame ‍‍‍	14	–	16	.467	32	–	21	.604
Virginia Tech ‍‍‍	12	–	18	.400	31	–	25	.554
Stanford ‍‍‍	11	–	19	.367	27	–	25	.519
Boston College ‍‍‍	11	–	19	.367	28	–	29	.491
Pittsburgh ‍‍‍	10	–	20	.333	28	–	27	.509
California ‍‍‍	9	–	21	.300	24	–	31	.436
† – Conference champion ‡ – Tournament champion y – Invited to the NCAA Tournament; As of June 23, 2025; Rankings from D1Baseball

The 2025 Atlantic Coast Conference baseball tournament was held May 20–25, 2025, at the Durham Bulls Athletic Park in Durham, North Carolina. The annual tournament determined the official conference champion of the Division I Atlantic Coast Conference for college baseball.

The tournament has been held every year but two since 1973, with Clemson winning eleven championships prior this, the most all-time. Georgia Tech has won nine championships, and Florida State has won eight titles since its entry to the league in 1992, matching defending champion North Carolina's total. Recent entrants Virginia Tech, Boston College, Pittsburgh, Notre Dame and Louisville have never won the event.

Due to the league's expansion, the format changed from the twelve-team round-robin tournament, to a sixteen-team single elimination bracket. The round-robin tournament had been used since 2007. It was also the first year of a single elimination format.

The Duke Blue Devils were the defending champions. Duke was unable to defend its crown as the seventh seed in the tournament, falling to second seed Florida State in the Quarterfinals. Third-seed North Carolina and fifth-seed Clemson would face-off in the Final, with North Carolina winning 14–4. The title was the ninth overall for North Carolina's baseball program and second for head coach Scott Forbes. It was North Carolina's third title in six years. As tournament champions, North Carolina earned the ACC's automatic bid to the 2025 NCAA Division I baseball tournament.

== Seeding ==
All of the sixteen teams that participated in the 2025 season qualified for the tournament. Seeds one through four were awarded a bye into the Quarterfinals, while seeds five through eight received a bye into the Second Round. A tiebreaker was required to determine the thirteenth and fourteenth seeds as Stanford and Boston College finished tied with 11–19 regular season records. The two teams met on May 2-4, and Stanford won the series 2–1, and therefore was the thirteenth seed.

Team	W	L	Pct.	GB	Seed
Georgia Tech	19	11	.633	—	1
Florida State	17	10	.630	0.5	2
North Carolina	18	11	.621	0.5	3
NC State	17	11	.607	1	4
Clemson	18	12	.600	1	5
Virginia	16	11	.593	1.5	6
Duke	17	13	.567	2	7
Wake Forest	16	14	.533	3	8
Miami	15	14	.517	3.5	9
Louisville	15	15	.500	4	10
Notre Dame	14	16	.467	5	11
Virginia Tech	12	18	.400	7	12
Stanford	11	19	.367	8	13
Boston College	11	19	.367	8	14
Pittsburgh	10	20	.333	9	15
California	9	21	.300	10	16

== Schedule and results ==
=== Bracket ===
First Round
9	Miami	2
16	California	12 (8)
12	Virginia Tech	7
13	Stanford	4
10	Louisville	11
15	Pittsburgh	13
11	Notre Dame	4
14	Boston College	5 (10)

Second Round
8	Wake Forest	12
16	California	14
5	Clemson	6
12	Virginia Tech	1
7	Duke	4
15	Pittsburgh	3
6	Virginia	8
14	Boston College	12

Quarterfinals
1	Georgia Tech	10
16	California	3
4	NC State	6
5	Clemson	7
2	Florida State	14
7	Duke	7
3	North Carolina	7
14	Boston College	2

Semifinals
1	Georgia Tech	4
5	Clemson	9
2	Florida State	5
3	North Carolina	7

Final
5	Clemson	4
3	North Carolina	14

=== Schedule ===
Game	Time*	Matchup^{#}	Score	Television	Attendance	Reference
Tuesday, May 20
1	9:00 a.m.	No. 16 California vs. No. 9 Miami	12−2 (8)	ACCN	1,721	
2	1:00 p.m.	No. 13 Stanford vs. No. 12 Virginia Tech	4−7	ACCN	2,197	
3	5:00 p.m.	No. 15 Pittsburgh vs. No. 10 Louisville	13–11	ACCN	2,348	
4	9:00 p.m.	No. 14 Boston College vs. No. 11 Notre Dame	5–4 (10)	ACCN	2,579	
Wednesday, May 21
5	9:00 a.m.	No. 16 California vs. No. 8 Wake Forest	14–12	ACCN	2,216	
6	1:00 p.m.	No. 12 Virginia Tech vs. No. 5 Clemson	1–6	ACCN	2,535	
7	5:00 p.m.	No. 15 Pittsburgh vs. No. 7 Duke	3–4	ACCN	2,878	
8	9:00 p.m.	No. 14 Boston College vs. No. 6 Virginia	12–8	ACCN	2,992	
Thursday, May 22
9	3:00 p.m.	No. 16 California vs. No. 1 Georgia Tech	3−10	ACCN	2,235	
10	7:00 p.m.	No. 5 Clemson vs. No. 4 NC State	7−6	ACCN	4,866	
Friday, May 23
11	3:00 p.m.	No. 7 Duke vs. No. 2 Florida State	7–14	ACCN	4,122	
12	7:00 p.m.	No. 14 Boston College vs. No. 3 North Carolina	2–7	ACCN	7,027	
Saturday, May 24
13	1:00 p.m.	No. 5 Clemson vs. No. 1 Georgia Tech	9–4	ACCN	5,118	
14	5:00 p.m.	No. 3 North Carolina vs. No. 2 Florida State	7–5	ACCN	8,165	
Championship – Sunday, May 25
Championship	12:00 p.m.	No. 5 Clemson vs. No. 3 North Carolina	4–14	ESPN2	9,159	
*Game times in EDT. # – Rankings denote tournament seed.

=== Game summaries ===
==== First Round ====
May 20; 9:00 a.m. ET; Game 1	(16) California	12–2 (F/8)	(9) Miami	Durham Bulls Athletic Park; Attendance: 1,721; Umpires: HP: Tim Rosso, 1B: Thomas Newsom, 2B: Brian Miller, 3B: Chris Ward
May 20; 9:00 a.m. ET; Game 1	WP: O. de la Torre (3−4)	Boxscore	LP: G. Hugus (5−7)	Durham Bulls Athletic Park; Attendance: 1,721; Umpires: HP: Tim Rosso, 1B: Thomas Newsom, 2B: Brian Miller, 3B: Chris Ward
May 20; 9:00 a.m. ET; Game 1	HR: A. Birge (12)	Boxscore	HR: T. Smith (4)	Durham Bulls Athletic Park; Attendance: 1,721; Umpires: HP: Tim Rosso, 1B: Thomas Newsom, 2B: Brian Miller, 3B: Chris Ward

May 20; 1:00 p.m. ET; Game 2	(13) Stanford	4–7	(12) Virginia Tech	Durham Bulls Athletic Park; Attendance: 2,197; Umpires: HP: Brandon Henson, 1B: Joe Blumenauer, 2B: Adam Dowdy, 3B: Greg Street
May 20; 1:00 p.m. ET; Game 2	LP: J. Volchko (3−4)	Boxscore	WP: P. Crowl (2−0); Sv: G. Manning (5)	Durham Bulls Athletic Park; Attendance: 2,197; Umpires: HP: Brandon Henson, 1B: Joe Blumenauer, 2B: Adam Dowdy, 3B: Greg Street
May 20; 1:00 p.m. ET; Game 2	HR: J. Nati (16), T. Haskins (14)	Boxscore	HR: M. Jordan (1)	Durham Bulls Athletic Park; Attendance: 2,197; Umpires: HP: Brandon Henson, 1B: Joe Blumenauer, 2B: Adam Dowdy, 3B: Greg Street

May 20; 5:00 p.m. ET; Game 3	(15) Pittsburgh	13–11	(10) Louisville	Durham Bulls Athletic Park; Attendance: 2,348; Umpires: HP: Doug Vines, 1B: Craig Barron, 3B: Linus Baker, 3B: Mike Jarboe
May 20; 5:00 p.m. ET; Game 3	WP: E. Firoved (3–4	Boxscore	LP: B. Cutts (3–1)	Durham Bulls Athletic Park; Attendance: 2,348; Umpires: HP: Doug Vines, 1B: Craig Barron, 3B: Linus Baker, 3B: Mike Jarboe
May 20; 5:00 p.m. ET; Game 3	HR: L. Cantwell (6), L. Carrier (7), J. Melendez (7)	Boxscore	HR: E. King Jr. (14)	Durham Bulls Athletic Park; Attendance: 2,348; Umpires: HP: Doug Vines, 1B: Craig Barron, 3B: Linus Baker, 3B: Mike Jarboe

May 20; 9:00 p.m. ET; Game 4	(14) Boston College	5–4 (F/10)	(11) Notre Dame	Durham Bulls Athletic Park; Attendance: 2,579; Umpires: HP: Ryan Clark, 1B: Jon Byrne, 3B: Travis Carlson, 3B: Jeff Gosney
May 20; 9:00 p.m. ET; Game 4	WP: G. Soares (4–1)	Boxscore	LP: T. McDonough (2–1)	Durham Bulls Athletic Park; Attendance: 2,579; Umpires: HP: Ryan Clark, 1B: Jon Byrne, 3B: Travis Carlson, 3B: Jeff Gosney
May 20; 9:00 p.m. ET; Game 4	HR: K. Wolff (8)	Boxscore	HR: E. Moreno (10)	Durham Bulls Athletic Park; Attendance: 2,579; Umpires: HP: Ryan Clark, 1B: Jon Byrne, 3B: Travis Carlson, 3B: Jeff Gosney

==== Second Round ====
May 21; 9:00 a.m. ET; Game 5	(16) California	14–12	(8) Wake Forest	Durham Bulls Athletic Park; Attendance: 2,216; Umpires: HP: Chris Ward, 1B: Mike Jarboe, 2B: Craig Barron, 3B: Brandon Henson
May 21; 9:00 a.m. ET; Game 5	WP: D. Shaw (1–4); Sv: L. Piper (2)	Boxscore	LP: L. Lunceford (5–5)	Durham Bulls Athletic Park; Attendance: 2,216; Umpires: HP: Chris Ward, 1B: Mike Jarboe, 2B: Craig Barron, 3B: Brandon Henson
May 21; 9:00 a.m. ET; Game 5	HR: C. Schmidt (6)	Boxscore	HR: D. Wentz 2 (12), A. Hawke (10), J. Keenan (8)	Durham Bulls Athletic Park; Attendance: 2,216; Umpires: HP: Chris Ward, 1B: Mike Jarboe, 2B: Craig Barron, 3B: Brandon Henson

May 21; 1:00 p.m. ET; Game 6	(12) Virginia Tech	1–6	(5) Clemson	Durham Bulls Athletic Park; Attendance: 2,535; Umpires: HP: Jon Byrne, 1B: Travis Carlson, 2B: Thomas Newsom, 3B: Adam Dowdy
May 21; 1:00 p.m. ET; Game 6	LP: B. Renfrow (3–7)	Boxscore	WP: A. Knaak (9–1)	Durham Bulls Athletic Park; Attendance: 2,535; Umpires: HP: Jon Byrne, 1B: Travis Carlson, 2B: Thomas Newsom, 3B: Adam Dowdy
May 21; 1:00 p.m. ET; Game 6		Boxscore	HR: D. Listi (6)	Durham Bulls Athletic Park; Attendance: 2,535; Umpires: HP: Jon Byrne, 1B: Travis Carlson, 2B: Thomas Newsom, 3B: Adam Dowdy

May 21; 5:00 p.m. ET; Game 7	(15) Pittsburgh	3–4	(7) Duke	Durham Bulls Athletic Park; Attendance: 2,878; Umpires: HP: Jeff Gosney, 1B: Doug Vines, 2B: Joe Blumenauer, 3B: Linus Baker
May 21; 5:00 p.m. ET; Game 7	LP: P. Gardner (4–6)	Boxscore	WP: J. Tallon (1–2)	Durham Bulls Athletic Park; Attendance: 2,878; Umpires: HP: Jeff Gosney, 1B: Doug Vines, 2B: Joe Blumenauer, 3B: Linus Baker
May 21; 5:00 p.m. ET; Game 7		Boxscore	HR: A. Garcia (13), M. Winslow (7)	Durham Bulls Athletic Park; Attendance: 2,878; Umpires: HP: Jeff Gosney, 1B: Doug Vines, 2B: Joe Blumenauer, 3B: Linus Baker

May 21; 9:00 p.m. ET; Game 8	(14) Boston College	12–8	(6) Virginia	Durham Bulls Athletic Park; Attendance: 2,992; Umpires: HP: Greg Street, 1B: Tim Rosso, 3B: Ryan Clark, 3B: Brian Miller
May 21; 9:00 p.m. ET; Game 8	WP: K. Kipp (4–3); Sv: C. Gonzalez (1)	Boxscore	LP: J. Wollfolk (4–3)	Durham Bulls Athletic Park; Attendance: 2,992; Umpires: HP: Greg Street, 1B: Tim Rosso, 3B: Ryan Clark, 3B: Brian Miller
May 21; 9:00 p.m. ET; Game 8		Boxscore	HR: E. Becker (9), H. Ford (11)	Durham Bulls Athletic Park; Attendance: 2,992; Umpires: HP: Greg Street, 1B: Tim Rosso, 3B: Ryan Clark, 3B: Brian Miller

==== Quarterfinals ====
May 22; 3:00 p.m. ET; Game 9	(16) California	3−10	(1) Georgia Tech	Durham Bulls Athletic Park; Attendance: 2,235; Umpires: HP: Adam Dowdy, 1B: Jeff Gosney, 2B: Greg Street, 3B: Mike Jarboe
May 22; 3:00 p.m. ET; Game 9	LP: JJ Hollis (0−1)	Boxscore	WP: T. McKee (7−3)	Durham Bulls Athletic Park; Attendance: 2,235; Umpires: HP: Adam Dowdy, 1B: Jeff Gosney, 2B: Greg Street, 3B: Mike Jarboe
May 22; 3:00 p.m. ET; Game 9		Boxscore	HR: D. Burris 2 (20), K. Lodise (15), V. Lackey (6), C. Daniel (8), D. Rogers (5)	Durham Bulls Athletic Park; Attendance: 2,235; Umpires: HP: Adam Dowdy, 1B: Jeff Gosney, 2B: Greg Street, 3B: Mike Jarboe

May 22; 7:00 p.m. ET; Game 10	(5) Clemson	7−6	(4) NC State	Durham Bulls Athletic Park; Attendance: 4,866; Umpires: HP: Craig Barron, 1B: Brian Miller, 2B: Travis Carlson, 3B: Linus Baker
May 22; 7:00 p.m. ET; Game 10	WP: Mahlstedt (3–0)	Boxscore	LP: Nance (8–2)	Durham Bulls Athletic Park; Attendance: 4,866; Umpires: HP: Craig Barron, 1B: Brian Miller, 2B: Travis Carlson, 3B: Linus Baker
May 22; 7:00 p.m. ET; Game 10	HR: J. Jarrell (14)	Boxscore		Durham Bulls Athletic Park; Attendance: 4,866; Umpires: HP: Craig Barron, 1B: Brian Miller, 2B: Travis Carlson, 3B: Linus Baker

May 23; 3:00 p.m. ET; Game 11	(7) Duke	7–14	(2) Florida State	Durham Bulls Athletic Park; Attendance: 4,122; Umpires: HP: Mike Jarboe, 1B: Linus Baker, 3B: Jon Byrne, 3B: Travis Carlson
May 23; 3:00 p.m. ET; Game 11	LP: O. Proksch (2–3)	Boxscore	WP: J. Arnold (7–2)	Durham Bulls Athletic Park; Attendance: 4,122; Umpires: HP: Mike Jarboe, 1B: Linus Baker, 3B: Jon Byrne, 3B: Travis Carlson
May 23; 3:00 p.m. ET; Game 11	HR: N. Murray (3)	Boxscore	HR: M. Bailey 2 (14), J. West (2)	Durham Bulls Athletic Park; Attendance: 4,122; Umpires: HP: Mike Jarboe, 1B: Linus Baker, 3B: Jon Byrne, 3B: Travis Carlson

May 23; 7:00 p.m. ET; Game 12	(14) Boston College	2–7	(3) North Carolina	Durham Bulls Athletic Park; Attendance: 7,027; Umpires: HP: Brian Miller, 1B: Greg Street, 3B: Ryan Clark, 3B: Craig Barron
May 23; 7:00 p.m. ET; Game 12	LP: J. Ogden (4–3)	Boxscore	WP: J. Knapp (12–0); Sv: W. McDuffie (5)	Durham Bulls Athletic Park; Attendance: 7,027; Umpires: HP: Brian Miller, 1B: Greg Street, 3B: Ryan Clark, 3B: Craig Barron
May 23; 7:00 p.m. ET; Game 12		Boxscore	HR: L. Stevenson (17)	Durham Bulls Athletic Park; Attendance: 7,027; Umpires: HP: Brian Miller, 1B: Greg Street, 3B: Ryan Clark, 3B: Craig Barron

==== Semifinals ====
May 24; 1:00 p.m. ET; Game 13	(5) Clemson	9–4	(1) Georgia Tech	Durham Bulls Athletic Park; Attendance: 5,118; Umpires: HP: Linus Baker, 1B: Adam Dowdy, 2B: Brian Miller, 3B: Ryan Clark
May 24; 1:00 p.m. ET; Game 13	WP: J. Allen (5–0); Sv: J. McGovern (2)	Boxscore	LP: B. Jones (7–3)	Durham Bulls Athletic Park; Attendance: 5,118; Umpires: HP: Linus Baker, 1B: Adam Dowdy, 2B: Brian Miller, 3B: Ryan Clark
May 24; 1:00 p.m. ET; Game 13	HR: J. Jarrell (15), C. Priest (12)	Boxscore	HR: D. Rogers (6)	Durham Bulls Athletic Park; Attendance: 5,118; Umpires: HP: Linus Baker, 1B: Adam Dowdy, 2B: Brian Miller, 3B: Ryan Clark

May 24; 5:00 p.m. ET; Game 14	(3) North Carolina	7–5	(2) Florida State	Durham Bulls Athletic Park; Attendance: 8,165; Umpires: HP: Travis Carlson, 1B: Mike Jarboe, 3B: Jeff Gosney, 3B: Jon Byrne
May 24; 5:00 p.m. ET; Game 14	WP: A. Haugh (5–4); Sv: W. McDuffie (6)	Boxscore	LP: J. Volini (8–5)	Durham Bulls Athletic Park; Attendance: 8,165; Umpires: HP: Travis Carlson, 1B: Mike Jarboe, 3B: Jeff Gosney, 3B: Jon Byrne
May 24; 5:00 p.m. ET; Game 14	HR: L. Stevenson (18)	Boxscore	HR: M. Bailey (15)	Durham Bulls Athletic Park; Attendance: 8,165; Umpires: HP: Travis Carlson, 1B: Mike Jarboe, 3B: Jeff Gosney, 3B: Jon Byrne

==== Championship game ====
ACC Championship
No. 5 Clemson	vs.	No. 3 North Carolina

May 25, 2025 12:00 p.m. (EDT) at Durham Bulls Athletic Park in Durham, North Carolina
Team	1	2	3	4	5	6	7	8	9	R	H	E
No. 5 Clemson	0	0	0	0	0	0	2	1	1	4	9	2
No. 3 North Carolina	1	2	1	0	8	2	0	0	X	14	13	1
WP: O. Johnson (2–0) LP: B. Bailey (2–5) Sv: None; Home runs: CU: C. Cannarella (3); UNC: T. Bass (9), H. Stokley (13), J. Van De Brake (6); Attendance: 9,159; Umpires: HP: Greg Street; 1B: Jeff Gosney; 2B: Linus Baker; 3B: Brian Miller; Boxscore

== All Tournament Team ==
Position	Player	Team
C	**Luke Stevenson**	North Carolina
1B	Myles Bailey	Florida State
2B	Jackson Van De Brake	North Carolina
SS	PJ Moutzouridis	California
3B	Patrick Roche	Boston College
OF	Jacob French	California
OF	Dominic Listi	Clemson
OF	Cam Cannarella	Clemson
DH	Eddie King, Jr.	Louisville
P	Jake Knapp	North Carolina
P	AJ Colarusso	Boston College

MVP in bold.
