= 2025 North Carolina Tar Heels baseball team =

American college baseball season

2025 North Carolina Tar Heels baseball

ACC tournament champions Chapel Hill Regional champions

Chapel Hill Super Regional, 1–2
- Conference: Atlantic Coast Conference

Ranking
- Coaches: No. 8
- D1Baseball.com: No. 9
- Record: 46–15 (18–11 ACC)
- Head coach: Scott Forbes (5th season)
- Assistant coaches: Bryant Gaines (15th season); Jesse Wierzbicki (9th season); Scott Jackson (9th season); Jason Howell (5th season)
- Captains: Jake Knapp; Jackson Van De Brake
- Home stadium: Boshamer Stadium

2025 Atlantic Coast Conference baseball standings
	Conf.				Overall
Team	W		L	PCT	W		L	PCT
No. 24 Georgia Tech ‍†‍‍^{y}	19	–	11	.633	41	–	19	.683
No. 10 Florida State ‍‍‍^{y}	17	–	10	.630	41	–	14	.745
No. 9 North Carolina ‍‍‡‍^{y}	18	–	11	.621	46	–	13	.780
NC State ‍‍‍^{y}	17	–	11	.607	35	–	21	.625
No. 23 Clemson ‍‍‍^{y}	18	–	12	.600	45	–	18	.714
Virginia ‍‍‍	16	–	11	.593	32	–	18	.640
No. 15 Duke ‍‍‍^{y}	17	–	13	.567	40	–	19	.678
Wake Forest ‍‍‍^{y}	16	–	14	.533	39	–	22	.639
No. 16 Miami (FL) ‍‍‍^{y}	15	–	14	.517	34	–	26	.567
No. 6 Louisville ‍‍‍^{y}	15	–	15	.500	39	–	21	.650
Notre Dame ‍‍‍	14	–	16	.467	32	–	21	.604
Virginia Tech ‍‍‍	12	–	18	.400	31	–	25	.554
Stanford ‍‍‍	11	–	19	.367	27	–	25	.519
Boston College ‍‍‍	11	–	19	.367	28	–	29	.491
Pittsburgh ‍‍‍	10	–	20	.333	28	–	27	.509
California ‍‍‍	9	–	21	.300	24	–	31	.436
† – Conference champion ‡ – Tournament champion y – Invited to the NCAA Tournament; As of June 23, 2025; Rankings from D1Baseball

The 2025 North Carolina Tar Heels baseball team represented the University of North Carolina at Chapel Hill in the 2025 NCAA Division I baseball season. The Tar Heels played their home games at Boshamer Stadium as a member of the Atlantic Coast Conference. They were led by head coach Scott Forbes, in his fifth season as head coach. Forbes was assisted by Scott Jackson, Bryant Gaines, Jesse Wierzbicki, and Jason Howell. Dave Arendas served as director of operations.

== Preseason ==
=== Coaches poll ===
The coaches poll was released on January 30, 2025. The Tar Heels were projected to finish in third place in the conference.

Coaches' Poll — Coastal
Predicted finish	Team	Points
1	Virginia	251 (13)
2	Florida State	230 (2)
3	North Carolina	217
4	Clemson	214 (1)
5	Duke	182
6	Wake Forest	171
7	NC State	168
8	Stanford	143
9	Louisville	128
10	Georgia Tech	113
11	Miami (FL)	87
12	Virginia Tech	85
13	California	60
14	Pitt	52
15	Notre Dame	44
16	Boston College	31

== Personnel ==
=== Starters ===
Lineup
Pos.	No.	Player.	Year
C	44	Luke Stevenson	Sophomore
1B	45	Hunter Stokely	Graduate
2B	6	Jackson Van De Brake	Senior
3B	5	Gavin Gallaher	Sophomore
SS	1	Alex Madera	Graduate
LF	4	Sawyer Black	Freshman
CF	27	Kane Kepley	Junior
RF	11	Tyson Bass	Graduate
DH	23	Sam Angelo	Graduate

Weekend pitching rotation
Day	No.	Player.	Year
Friday	42	Jake Knapp	Graduate
Saturday	29	Jason DeCaro	Sophomore
Sunday	47	Aidan Haugh	Senior

=== Roster ===
Class Listing as reflected on GoHeels.com

2025 North Carolina Tar Heels roster
Pitchers: 10 – Tom Chmielewski – Graduate; 15 – Cameron Padgett – Junior; 17 – Boston Flannery – Sophomore; 19 – Camron Seagraves – Freshman; 24 – Matthew Matthijs – Junior; 26 – Kyle Percival – Junior; 28 – Riley Leatherman – Freshman; 29 – Jason DeCaro – Sophomore; 31 – Olin Johnson – Sophomore; 35 – Francesco Capocci – Sophomore; 36 – Folger Boaz – Sophomore; 38 – Cale Bolton – Graduate; 39 – Harrison Lewis – (redshirt) Freshman; 40 – Walker McDuffie – Freshman; 41 – Jacob Kirby – Sophomore; 42 – Jake Knapp – Graduate; 46 – Will Simmons – Junior; 47 – Aidan Haugh – Senior; 48 – Ryan Hench – (redshirt) Freshman; 49 – Dylan Weber – Graduate; 51 – Tim Lawson – Freshman; 52 – Andrew Wallen – Freshman; 53 – Ryan Lynch – Freshman; 54 – Mason Yokum – (redshirt) Freshman; 55 – John Hughes – Freshman	Catchers: 12 – Macaddin Dye – Sophomore; 44 – Luke Stevenson – Sophomore; 50 – Mitch Wilson – Freshman; Infielders: 1 – Alex Madera – Graduate; 3 – Lee Sowers – Freshman; 5 – Gavin Gallaher – Sophomore; 6 – Jackson Van De Brake – Senior; 8 – Boaz Harper – Freshman; 14 – Parker McCoy – Freshman; 20 – Alex Ferrell – Freshman; 23 – Sam Angelo – Graduate; 43 – Tyler Parks – (redshirt) Freshman; 45 – Hunter Stokely – Graduate	Outfielders: 2 – Reece Holbrook – (redshirt) Junior; 4 – Sawyer Black – Freshman; 7 – Perry Hargett – Freshman; 11 – Tyson Bass – Graduate; 18 – Carter French – Junior; 27 – Kane Kepley – Junior; Utility: 25 – Rom Kellis V (C/INF) – Junior

=== Coaching staff ===
2025 North Carolina Tar Heels coaching staff
Name	Position	Seasons	Alma mater
Scott Forbes	Head coach	5	NC Wesleyan (1998)
Bryant Gaines	Assistant Head Coach/Pitching Coach	15	North Carolina (2011)
Jesse Wierzbicki	Assistant Coach/Hitting Coach/Infielders & Catchers	9	North Carolina (2011)
Scott Jackson	Assistant Coach/Recruiting Coordinator	9	Campbell (1998)
Jason Howell	Director of Pitching Performance, Development and Analytics	5	North Carolina (2002)
Dave Arendas	Director of Baseball Operations	20	North Carolina (1990)

== Offseason ==
=== Departures ===
Offseason departures
Name	Number	Pos.	Height	Weight	Year	Hometown	Notes
Colby Wilkerson	3	INF	5'10"	180	Senior	Oxford, North Carolina	
Patrick Alvarez	8	INF/OF	5'7"	165	Senior	Charlotte, North Carolina	
Eliot Dix	10	INF	5'10"	195	Graduate	Maplewood, New Jersey	
Parks Harber	14	INF	6'3"	225	Senior	Atlanta, Georgia	
Johnny Castagnozzi	19	INF	6'2"	205	Senior	Massapequa, New York	
Kaleb Cost	20	OF	5'10"	190	Freshman	Atlanta, Georgia	
Ben Peterson	25	RHP	6'3"	217	Senior	Cary, North Carolina	
Connor Bovair	27	RHP	6'1"	210	Senior	Moreau, New York	
Matt Poston	38	RHP	6'4"	235	Senior	Hampton, South Carolina	
Hugh Collins	50	LHP	6'1"	185	Freshman	Clayton, North Carolina	
Ryan Fischer	51	RHP	6'2"	225	Graduate	Whitehouse Station, New Jersey	
Parker Haskin	52	C	5'9"	185	Graduate	Palm Beach Gardens, Florida	
Luke Osteen	56	RHP	6'1"	185	Freshman	Huntersville, North Carolina	

==== Outgoing transfers ====
Outgoing transfers
Name	Number	Pos.	Height	Weight	Hometown	Year	New school	Source
Ryker Galaska	12	INF/OF	6'1"	195	Greenville, NC	Junior	UNC Wilmington	
Alberto Osuna	23	1B/DH	6'1"	245	Mauldin, SC	Senior	Tennessee (Note: Originally committed to play at Tampa.)	

==== 2024 MLB draft ====
2024 MLB draft class
Round	Pick	Overall pick	Player	Position	MLB team	Source
1	22	22	Vance Honeycutt	OF	Baltimore Orioles	
3	29	103	Casey Cook	OF	Texas Rangers	
10	18	303	Anthony Donofrio	OF	Seattle Mariners	
11	30	345	Dalton Pence	LHP	Texas Rangers	
13	12	387	Shea Sprague	LHP	Boston Red Sox	
16	23	488	Aidan Haugh	RHP	Minnesota Twins	

=== Acquisitions ===
==== Incoming transfers ====
Incoming transfers
Name	Number	Pos.	Height	Weight	Hometown	Year	Previous school	Source
Tom Chmielewski	10	LHP	6'2"	210	Needham, MA	Graduate	Princeton	
Tyson Bass	11	OF	6'3"	211	Lucama, NC	Graduate	North Carolina Wesleyan	
Macaddin Dye	12	C	6'1"	215	Virginia Beach, VA	Sophomore	Liberty	
Sam Angelo	23	INF	6'0"	225	Toms River, NJ	Graduate	Montclair State	
Rom Kellis V	25	C/INF	6'1"	203	Gilbert, SC	Junior	Florence–Darlington TC	
Kane Kepley	27	OF	5'8"	180	Salisbury, NC	Junior	Liberty	
Cale Bolton	38	RHP	6'5"	240	Louisburg, NC	Graduate	Liberty	
Dylan Weber	49	LHP	6'0"	197	Sterling, VA	Graduate	Christopher Newport	

==== Incoming recruits ====
2024 North Carolina Recruits
Name	Number	B/T	Pos.	Height	Weight	Hometown	High School	Source
Lee Sowers	3	L/R	INF	5'10"	185	Glen Allen, Virginia	Douglas S. Freeman	
Sawyer Black	4	L/R	OF	6'1"	194	Oak Ridge, North Carolina	Wesleyan Christian Academy	
Perry Hargett	7	R/R	OF	6'0"	187	Peachland, North Carolina	Metrolina Christian Academy	
Boaz Harper	8	S/R	INF	5'11"	175	Angier, North Carolina	Grace Christian	
Parker McCoy	14	R/R	INF	6'1"	205	Pembroke, Georgia	Benedictine Military	
Camron Seagraves	19	R/R	RHP	6'3"	179	Ellerbe, North Carolina	Grace Christian	
Alex Ferrell	20	R/R	INF	6'1"	209	Mount Olive, North Carolina	Southern Wayne	
Riley Leatherman	28	R/R	RHP	6'2"	180	Maple Grove, Minnesota	Wayzata	
Walker McDuffie	40	R/R	RHP	6'0"	200	Broadway, North Carolina	Lee County	
Mitch Wilson	50	R/R	C	6'3"	212	Pauline, South Carolina	Dorman	
Tim Lawson	51	L/L	LHP	6'5"	230	Fort Myers, Florida	Bishop Verot	
Andrew Wallen	52	R/R	RHP	6'7"	245	Greenville, North Carolina	JH Rose	
Ryan Lynch	53	R/R	RHP	6'3"	235	Moorestown, New Jersey	Moorestown	
John Hughes	55	L/L	LHP	6'0"	215	Hinsdale, Illinois	Nazareth Academy	

== Game log ==
2025 North Carolina Tar Heels baseball game log (46–15)
Regular Season (39–12)

February (10–0)
Date	TV	Opponent	Rank	Stadium	Score	Win	Loss	Save	Attendance	Overall	ACC	Source
February 14 (DH 1)	ACCNX	Texas Tech*	No. 6	Boshamer Stadium; Chapel Hill, NC	W 5–1	DeCaro (1–0)	Cebert (0–1)	None	2,245	1–0	—	
February 14 (DH 2)	ACCNX	Texas Tech*	No. 6	Boshamer Stadium	W 8–3	McDuffie (1–0)	Parish (0–1)	None	2,822	2–0	—	
February 15	ACCNX	Texas Tech*	No. 6	Boshamer Stadium	W 4–2	Lynch (1–0)	Burns (0–1)	Matthijs (1)	2,475	3–0	—	
February 18	ACCNX	Kansas State*	No. 6	Boshamer Stadium	W 12–9	Seagraves (1–0)	Guyette (0–1)	None	2,326	4–0	—	
February 22		vs. East Carolina*	No. 6	Durham Bulls Athletic Park; Durham, NC	W 2–0	DeCaro (2–0)	Norby (0–2)	McDuffie (1)	6,695	5–0	—	
February 23	ACCNX	East Carolina*	No. 6	Boshamer Stadium	W 11–6	Boaz (1–0)	Williams (0–1)	None	3,914	6–0	—	
February 24	ESPN+	at East Carolina*	No. 5	Clark–LeClair Stadium; Greenville, NC	W 6–3	Haugh (1–0)	Zayac (0–1)	Matthijs (2)	5,802	7–0	—	
February 25	ACCNX	VCU*	No. 5	Boshamer Stadium	W 9–4	McDuffie (2–0)	Coston (0–1)	None	2,628	8–0	—	
February 26	ACCNX	North Carolina A&T*	No. 5	Boshamer Stadium	W 13–4	Padgett (1–0)	Duke (0–1)	None	2,538	9–0	—	
February 28	ACCNX	Stony Brook*	No. 5	Boshamer Stadium	W 16–2	DeCaro (3–0)	Smink (0–1)	None	2,912	10–0	—	

March (12–7)
Date	TV	Opponent	Rank	Stadium	Score	Win	Loss	Save	Attendance	Overall	ACC	Source
March 1	ACCNX	Stony Brook*	No. 5	Boshamer Stadium	W 6–1	Knapp (1–0)	Rizzo (1–1)	None	3,828	11–0	—	
March 2	ACCNX	Stony Brook*	No. 5	Boshamer Stadium	W 9–5	Haugh (2–0)	Colagrande (0–1)	None	2,531	12–0	—	
March 4	ACCNX	No. 24 Coastal Carolina*	No. 4	Boshamer Stadium	W 5–4^{11}	Padgett (2–0)	Potok (1–1)	None	2,550	13–0	—	
March 5	ACCNX	College of Charleston*	No. 4	Boshamer Stadium	Postponed							
March 7	ACCNX	Stanford	No. 4	Boshamer Stadium	L 9–13	Uber (1–0)	DeCaro (3–1)	None	3,075	13–1	0–1	
March 8	ACCNX	Stanford	No. 4	Boshamer Stadium	W 11–1^{7}	Knapp (2–0)	Lim (1–2)	None	3,393	14–1	1–1	
March 9	ACCNX	Stanford	No. 4	Boshamer Stadium	L 0–7	Volchko (2–0)	Haugh (2–1)	None	2,906	14–2	1–2	
March 11	FloSports	at UNC Wilmington*	No. 6	Brooks Field; Wilmington, NC	W 7–3^{10}	Matthjis (1–0)	Baker (0–1)	None	3,242	15–2	—	
March 14 (DH 1)	ACCNX	at Louisville	No. 6	Jim Patterson Stadium; Louisville	L 7–8	Eberle (1–0)	Matthjis (1–1)	Biven (1)	2,855	15–3	1–3	
March 14 (DH 2)	ACCNX	at Louisville	No. 6	Jim Patterson Stadium	W 6–4	Knapp (3–0)	Brown (2–2)	None	1,779	16–3	2–3	
March 16	ACCNX	at Louisville	No. 6	Jim Patterson Stadium	L 0–5	Michael (3–0)	Haugh (2–2)	None	2,338	16–4	2–4	
March 19	ACCNX	UConn*	No. 17	Boshamer Stadium	L 1–5	Hamberger (1–0)	Padgett (2–1)	Afthim (2)	3,375	16–5	—	
March 21	ACCNX	at Boston College	No. 17	Pellagrini Diamond; Boston, MA	W 5–1	Knapp (4–0)	Colarusso (1–2)	None	403	17–5	3–4	
March 22	ACCNX	at Boston College	No. 17	Pellagrini Diamond	L 2–3	Kipp (1–1)	DeCaro (3–2)	Ryan (4)	830	17–6	3–5	
March 23	ACCNX	at Boston College	No. 17	Pellagrini Diamond	W 10–0^{7}	Haugh (3–2)	Schroeder (1–3)	None	683	18–6	4–5	
Carolinas Series
March 25	SECN+	vs. South Carolina*	No. 21	Truist Field; Charlotte, NC	W 13–8	Lynch (2–0)	Russell (1–1)	None	4,871	19–6	—	
March 28	ACCNX	Miami (FL)*	No. 21	Boshamer Stadium	W 2–0	Knapp (4–0)	Hugus (3–3)	McDuffie (2)	3,412	20–6	5–5	
March 29	ACCNX	Miami (FL)	No. 21	Boshamer Stadium	W 4–2	DeCaro (4–2)	Walters (2–2)	Lynch (1)	4,002	21–6	6–5	
March 30	ACCNX	Miami (FL)	No. 21	Boshamer Stadium	L 2–4	Giroux (3–1)	McDuffie (2–1)	None	3,048	21–7	6–6	

April (13–3)
Date	TV	Opponent	Rank	Stadium	Score	Win	Loss	Save	Attendance	Overall	ACC	Source
April 1	ACCNX	Gardner–Webb*	No. 19	Boshamer Stadium	W 11–1^{7}	Johnson (1–0)	Franklin (0–1)	None		22–7	—	
Tobacco Road Series
April 3	ACCN	Duke	No. 19	Boshamer Stadium	W 4–3	Knapp (6–0)	Proksch (1–1)	McDuffie (3)	4,045	23–7	7–6	
April 4	ACCNX	Duke	No. 19	Boshamer Stadium	L 5–9	Nard (5–1)	DeCaro (4–3)	None	3,667	23–8	7–7	
April 5	ACCNX	Duke	No. 19	Boshamer Stadium	W 8–7^{14}	Boaz (2–0)	Stammel (0–1)	None	4,044	24–8	8–7	
April 8		at Elon*	No. 16	Walter C. Latham Park; Elon, NC	W 12–10	Boaz (3–0)	Wehner (0–2)	McDuffie (4)	745	25–8	—	
Carlyle Series
April 11	ACCN	Wake Forest	No. 16	Boshamer Stadium	W 11–1^{7}	Knapp (7–0)	Levonas (2–1)	None	3,032	26–8	9–7	
April 12	ACCNX	Wake Forest	No. 16	Boshamer Stadium	W 17–1^{7}	Haugh (4–2)	Lunceford (5–3)	None	4,005	27–8	10–7	
April 13	ESPN2	Wake Forest	No. 16	Boshamer Stadium	W 3–2	McDuffie (3–1)	Morningstar (4–1)	None	2,962	28–8	11–7	
April 15	ACCNX	Charlotte*	No. 12	Boshamer Stadium	W 14–4^{8}	Lynch (3–0)	Perez (0–2)	None	4,114	29–8	—	
April 18	ACCNX	at Virginia Tech	No. 12	English Field; Blacksburg, VA	W 9–6	Knapp (8–0)	Renfrow (3–4)	McDuffie (4)	2,288	30–8	12–7	
April 19	ACCNX	at Virginia Tech	No. 12	English Field	L 6–10	Manning (3–3)	Haugh (4–3)	None	2,581	30–9	12–8	
April 20	ACCN	at Virginia Tech	No. 12	English Field	W 7–4	DeCaro (5–3)	LeJeune (2–1)	Lynch (1)	1,395	31–9	13–8	
April 22	ACCNX	Presbyterian*	No. 8	Boshamer Stadium	Canceled							
April 25	ACCNX	at Pitt	No. 8	Charles L. Cost Field; Pittsburgh, PA	W 15–5	Knapp (9–0)	Gardner (3–3)	None	740	32–9	14–8	
April 26	ACCNX	at Pitt	No. 8	Charles L. Cost Field	L 2–4	Ryan (4–3)	Haugh (4–4)	Fivored (1)	717	32–10	14–9	
April 27	ACCNX	at Pitt	No. 8	Charles L. Cost Field	W 6–0	DeCaro (6–3)	McAuliff (2–3)	None	743	33–10	15–9	
April 29	ACCNX	George Mason*	No. 4	Boshamer Stadium	W 13–4	Lynch (4–0)	Rumberg (3–3)	None	2,434	34–10	—	
April 30	ACCNX	Queens (NC)*	No. 4	Boshamer Stadium	W 14–3^{8}	Seagraves (2–0)	Westfall (1–2)	None	2,717	35–10	—	

May (9–2)
Date	TV	Opponent	Rank	Stadium	Score	Win	Loss	Save	Attendance	Overall	ACC	Source
May 6	ACCNX	Campbell*	No. 4	Boshamer Stadium	W 10–1	DeCaro (7–3)	Grubich (2–3)	None	2,884	36–10	—	
Triangle Series
May 8	ACCNX	No. 16 NC State	No. 4	Boshamer Stadium	W 8–1	Knapp (10–0)	Marohn (6–3)	None	3,729	37–10	16–9	
May 9	ACCNX	No. 16 NC State	No. 4	Boshamer Stadium	L 5–8	Nance (8–1)	Lynch (4–1)	Shaffner (7)	4,152	37–11	16–10	
May 11	ACCN	No. 16 NC State	No. 4	Boshamer Stadium	Canceled due to inclement weather							
May 13	ACCNX	UNCW*	No. 4	Boshamer Stadium	Canceled due to forecasted inclement weather							
May 15	ACCN	at No. 2 Florida State	No. 4	Dick Howser Stadium; Tallahassee, FL	W 8–3	Knapp (11–0)	Arnold (6–2)	None	5,413	38–11	17–10	
May 16	ACCN	at No. 2 Florida State	No. 4	Dick Howser Stadium	W 11–1^{7}	DeCaro (8–3)	Volini (8–4)	None	5,999	39–11	18–10	
May 17	ACCNX	at No. 2 Florida State	No. 4	Dick Howser Stadium	L 4–5	Abraham (4–0)	Seagraves (2–1)	None	5,254	39–12	18–11	

Postseason (7–2)

ACC tournament (3–0)
Date	TV	Opponent	Rank	Stadium	Score	Win	Loss	Save	Attendance	Overall	Tournament Record	Source
May 23	ACCN	(14) Boston College	(3) No. 3	Durham Bulls Athletic Park; Durham, NC	W 7–2	Knapp (12–0)	Ogden (4–3)	Mcduffie (5)	7,027	40–12	1–0	
May 24	ACCN	(2) Florida State	(3) No. 3	Durham Bulls Athletic Park; Durham, NC	W 7–5	Haugh (5–4)	Volini (8–5)	Mcduffie (6)	8,165	41–12	2–0	
May 25	ACCN	(5) Clemson	(3) No. 3	Durham Bulls Athletic Park; Durham, NC	W 14–4	Johnson (2–0)	Bailey (2–5)	None	9,159	42–12	3–0	

Chapel Hill Regional (3–1)
Date	TV	Opponent	Rank	Stadium	Score	Win	Loss	Save	Attendance	Overall	Tournament Record	Source
May 30	ACCN	(4) Holy Cross	(1) No. 1	Boshamer Stadium	W 4–0	Knapp (13–0)	Macchiarola (9–5)	None	4,005	43–12	1–0	
May 31	ESPNU	(2) Oklahoma	(1) No. 1	Boshamer Stadium	W 11–5	Decaro (9–3)	Witherspoon (10–4)	None	4,029	44–12	2–0	
June 1	ACCN	(2) Oklahoma	(1) No. 1	Boshamer Stadium	L 5–9	Hitt (3–0)	Johnson (2–1)	Crooks (16)	4,001	44–13	2–1	
June 2	ESPNU	(2) Oklahoma	(1) No. 1	Boshamer Stadium	W 14–4	Lynch (5–1)	Hensley (4–2)	None		45–13	3–1	

Chapel Hill Super Regional (1–2)
Date	TV	Opponent	Rank	Stadium	Score	Win	Loss	Save	Attendance	Overall	Tournament Record	Source
June 6	ESPN2	No. 21 Arizona	(5) No. 1	Boshamer Stadium	W 18–2	Knapp (14–0)	Kramkowski (9–6)	None	4,045	46–13	1–0	
June 7	ESPN2	No. 21 Arizona	(5) No. 1	Boshamer Stadium	L 8–10	Pluta (3–0)	McDuffie (3–2)	None	4,032	46–14	1–1	
June 8	ESPN2	No. 21 Arizona	(5) No. 1	Boshamer Stadium	L 3–4	Tonghini (5–2)	McDuffie (3–3)	Pluta (14)	4,013	46–15	1–2	

Legend: = Win = Loss = Canceled
Bold =North Carolina team member * Non-conference game
Rankings are based on the team's current ranking in the D1Baseball poll.

== Rankings ==
Ranking movements Legend: ██ Increase in ranking ██ Decrease in ranking ( ) = First-place votes
	Week																		
Poll	Pre	1	2	3	4	5	6	7	8	9	10	11	12	13	14	15	16	17	Final
Coaches'	8	8*	6	4	8	15	18	14	13	10	8	3	5	4	3 (1)	1 (6)			
Baseball America	12	10	9	7	10	16	18	11	8	5	3	3	4	3	2	2*			
NCBWA†	6	7	5	3	3	8	14	12	11	10	8	8	4	4	3	2			
D1Baseball	6	6	5	4	6	17	21	19	16	12	8	4	4	4	3	1			
Perfect Game	19	10	8	7	12	23	25	23	23	15	10	5	5	5	3	2*			

† NCBWA ranks 30 teams in their preseason poll, but only ranks 25 teams weekly during the season.
* A new poll was not released for this week, so for comparison purposes, the previous week's ranking is inserted in this week's slot.

== Awards and honors ==
=== Preseason awards and honors ===
Preseason awards — National
Name	Pos.	Award	Team	Selector	Source

Preseason awards — Regional
Name	Pos.	Award	Team	Selector	Source

Preseason awards — Conference
Name	Pos.	Award	Team	Selector	Source
