= 2025 NC State Wolfpack baseball team =

American college baseball season

2025 NC State Wolfpack baseball

NCAA Auburn Regional, 2-2
- Conference: Atlantic Coast Conference
- Record: 35-21 (17-11 ACC)
- Head coach: Elliott Avent (28th season)
- Assistant coaches: Chris Hart (20th season); Joey Holcomb (6th season)
- Pitching coach: Clint Chrysler (7th season)
- Home stadium: Doak Field

2025 Atlantic Coast Conference baseball standings
	Conf.				Overall
Team	W		L	PCT	W		L	PCT
No. 18 Georgia Tech ‍†‍‍^{y}	19	–	11	.633	41	–	19	.683
No. 7 Florida State ‍‍‍^{y}	17	–	10	.630	41	–	14	.745
No. 1 North Carolina ‍‍‡‍^{y}	18	–	11	.621	46	–	13	.780
NC State ‍‍‍^{y}	17	–	11	.607	35	–	21	.625
No. 14 Clemson ‍‍‍^{y}	18	–	12	.600	45	–	18	.714
Virginia ‍‍‍	16	–	11	.593	32	–	18	.640
Duke ‍‍‍^{y}	17	–	13	.567	40	–	19	.678
Wake Forest ‍‍‍^{y}	16	–	14	.533	39	–	22	.639
Miami (FL) ‍‍‍^{y}	15	–	14	.517	34	–	26	.567
Louisville ‍‍‍^{y}	15	–	15	.500	39	–	21	.650
Notre Dame ‍‍‍	14	–	16	.467	32	–	21	.604
Virginia Tech ‍‍‍	12	–	18	.400	31	–	25	.554
Stanford ‍‍‍	11	–	19	.367	27	–	25	.519
Boston College ‍‍‍	11	–	19	.367	28	–	29	.491
Pittsburgh ‍‍‍	10	–	20	.333	28	–	27	.509
California ‍‍‍	9	–	21	.300	24	–	31	.436
† – Conference champion ‡ – Tournament champion y – Invited to the NCAA Tournament; As of June 6, 2025; Rankings from D1Baseball

The 2025 NC State Wolfpack baseball team represented North Carolina State University during the 2025 NCAA Division I baseball season. The Wolfpack played their home games at Doak Field as a member of the Atlantic Coast Conference (ACC). They were led by head coach Elliott Avent, who was in his 28th season at NC State.

== Personnel ==
=== Roster ===
2025 NC State Wolfpack roster
Pitchers: 20 - Ryan Marohn - Sophomore; 28 - Cooper Consiglia - Sophomore; 40 - Eli Phillsburgh - Junior; 42 - Jacob Dienes - (redshirt) Junior; 51 - Dominic Fritton - Junior; 99 - Tristan Potts - Freshman; 16 - Truitt Manuel - Freshman; 18 - Jaxson Lucas - Sophomore; 19 - Heath Andrews - Sophomore; 23 - Matt Willadsen - Graduate Student; 24 - Carson Kelly - Senior; 25 - Derrick Smith - Junior; 29 - Julien Peissel - Junior; 31 - Shane Van Dam - Junior; 33 - Kaden Morris - Freshman; 34 - Anderson Nace - Freshman; 36 - Camden Wimbish - Sophomore; 37 - Aden Knowles - Freshman; 38 - Landon Carr - Junior; 41 - Jacob Dudan - Sophomore; 48 - Andrew Shaffner - Junior	Catchers: 11 - Preston Bonn - Freshman; 13 - Alex Sosa - Sophomore; 15 - Drew Lanphere - (redshirt) Sophomore; Infielders: 0 - Luke Nixon - Sophomore; 3 - Ryder Woodson - Freshman; 6 - Matt Heavner - Junior; 8 - Justin DeCriscio - Senior; 10 - Ryan Jaros - Sophomore; 17 - Matt Ossenfort - Sophomore; 27 - Chris McHugh - Sophomore; 50 - Brandon Novy - Freshman	Outfielders: 1 - Trey Bentley - Freshman; 2 - Brayden Fraasman - Junior; 14 - Ty Head - Freshman; 22 - Josh Hogue - Junior; 47 - Jake Bechtel - Sophomore; 53 - Jet Gilliam - Sophomore; Utility: 12 - Trenton Lyons - Sophomore

=== Coaching staff ===
2025 NC State wolfpack coaching staff
Name	Position	Seasons at NC State	Alma mater
Elliott Avent	Head coach	28	NC State (1978)
Chris Hart	Associate head coach	20	Florida State (2003)
Clint Chrysler	Pitching Coach	7	Daytona State (2009)
Joey Holcomb	Assistant Coach	6	Huntingdon (2006)

== Personnel ==
=== Starters ===
Opening Night Lineup
Pos.	No.	Player.	Year
LF			
CF			
SS			
DH			
1B			
RF			
3B			
C			
2B			

Weekend pitching rotation
Day	No.	Player.	Year
Friday			
Saturday			
Sunday			

== Schedule and results ==
2025 NC State baseball game log (Overall: 0-0; Conference: 0-0); (Home: 0-0; Away: 0-0)
Regular season (0-0)
February (0-0)
(Home; 0-0; Away: 0-0)

Date Time	Opponent	Rank	TV	Venue	Score	Win	Loss	Save	Attendance	Overall record	ACC record

March (0-0)
(Home; 0-0; Away: 0-0)

Date Time	Opponent	Rank	TV	Venue	Score	Win	Loss	Save	Attendance	Overall record	ACC record

April (0-0)
(Home; 0-0; Away: 0-0)

Date Time	Opponent	Rank	TV	Venue	Score	Win	Loss	Save	Attendance	Overall record	ACC record

May (0-0)
(Home; 0-0; Away: 0-0)

Date Time	Opponent	Rank	TV	Venue	Score	Win	Loss	Save	Attendance	Overall record	ACC record

Postseason (0-0)
ACC Tournament (0-0)

Date Time	Opponent	Rank	TV	Venue	Score	Win	Loss	Save	Attendance	Overall record	Tournament record

Auburn Regional (0-0)

Date Time	Opponent	Rank	TV	Venue	Score	Win	Loss	Save	Attendance	Overall record	NCAAT record

"#" represents ranking. All rankings from D1 Baseball Poll on the date of the contest.
"()" represents postseason seeding in the ACC Tournament or NCAA Regional, respectively.
= Win, = Loss, = Canceled/Postponed
Bold = **NC State team member**
* = Non-Conference Game
Schedule Source:

== Rankings ==
Ranking movements
	Week																
Poll	Pre	1	2	3	4	5	6	7	8	9	10	11	12	13	14	15	Final
Coaches'		*															
Baseball America																	
NCBWA†																	

† NCBWA ranks 30 teams in their preseason poll, but only ranks 25 teams weekly during the season.
* A new poll was not released for this week, so for comparison purposes, the previous week's ranking is inserted in this week's slot.

== 2025 MLB draft ==
Player	Position	Round	Overall	MLB team
