= 2025 Georgia Tech Yellow Jackets baseball team =

American college baseball season

2025 Georgia Tech Yellow Jackets baseball

ACC regular season champions

Oxford Regional, 1–2
- Conference: Atlantic Coast Conference

Ranking
- Coaches: No. 17
- D1Baseball.com: No. 18
- Record: 41–19 (19–11 ACC)
- Head coach: Danny Hall (32th season)
- Home stadium: Russ Chandler Stadium

2025 Atlantic Coast Conference baseball standings
	Conf.				Overall
Team	W		L	PCT	W		L	PCT
No. 18 Georgia Tech ‍†‍‍^{y}	19	–	11	.633	41	–	19	.683
No. 7 Florida State ‍‍‍^{y}	17	–	10	.630	41	–	14	.745
No. 1 North Carolina ‍‍‡‍^{y}	18	–	11	.621	46	–	13	.780
NC State ‍‍‍^{y}	17	–	11	.607	35	–	21	.625
No. 14 Clemson ‍‍‍^{y}	18	–	12	.600	45	–	18	.714
Virginia ‍‍‍	16	–	11	.593	32	–	18	.640
Duke ‍‍‍^{y}	17	–	13	.567	40	–	19	.678
Wake Forest ‍‍‍^{y}	16	–	14	.533	39	–	22	.639
Miami (FL) ‍‍‍^{y}	15	–	14	.517	34	–	26	.567
Louisville ‍‍‍^{y}	15	–	15	.500	39	–	21	.650
Notre Dame ‍‍‍	14	–	16	.467	32	–	21	.604
Virginia Tech ‍‍‍	12	–	18	.400	31	–	25	.554
Stanford ‍‍‍	11	–	19	.367	27	–	25	.519
Boston College ‍‍‍	11	–	19	.367	28	–	29	.491
Pittsburgh ‍‍‍	10	–	20	.333	28	–	27	.509
California ‍‍‍	9	–	21	.300	24	–	31	.436
† – Conference champion ‡ – Tournament champion y – Invited to the NCAA Tournament; As of June 6, 2025; Rankings from D1Baseball

The 2025 Georgia Tech Yellow Jackets baseball team represented Georgia Tech during the 2025 NCAA Division I baseball season. The Yellow Jackets played their home games at Russ Chandler Stadium as a member of the Atlantic Coast Conference. They were led by head coach Danny Hall, in his 32nd season at Georgia Tech. They won the ACC Regular Season Title with their record of 19-11 in conference play. It was their first conference regular season title since 2011. The team competed in the Oxford Regional in Oxford, MS from May 30th to June 2nd where they were eliminated by Ole Miss.

== Previous season ==
The 2024 Yellow Jackets went 33-25 and qualified for the Athens Regional, where they were eliminated.

== Schedule ==
Georgia Tech Yellow Jackets 2025 baseball game log
Date	Opponent	Result	Record	Venue
February 14	Old Dominion	W 3–2	1–0	Russ Chandler Stadium
February 15	Old Dominion	W 7–3	2–0	Russ Chandler Stadium
February 16	Old Dominion	W 7–4	3–0	Russ Chandler Stadium
February 18	at Georgia Southern	W 5–3	4–0	J. I. Clements Stadium
February 21	Marshall	W 12–1	5–0	Russ Chandler Stadium
February 22	Marshall	L 2–4	5–1	Russ Chandler Stadium
February 23	Marshall	W 11–6	6–1	Russ Chandler Stadium
February 24	Marshall	L 8–12	6–2	Russ Chandler Stadium
February 26	West Georgia	W 16–7	7–2	Russ Chandler Stadium
February 28	Western Michigan	W 16–4	8–2	Russ Chandler Stadium
March 1	Western Michigan	W 14–1	9–2	Russ Chandler Stadium
March 2	Western Michigan	W 13–3	10–2	Russ Chandler Stadium
March 4	Kennesaw State	W 11–4	11–2	Russ Chandler Stadium
March 7	at Virginia Tech	W 4–3	12–2	English Field
March 8	at Virginia Tech	L 5–8	12–3	English Field
March 9	at Virginia Tech	W 8–6	13–3	English Field
March 11	Georgia State	W 4–2	14–3	Russ Chandler Stadium
March 14	Pitt	W 10–1	15–3	Russ Chandler Stadium
March 15	Pitt	W 11–1	16–3	Russ Chandler Stadium
March 16	Pitt	L 10–12	16–4	Russ Chandler Stadium
March 18	Gardner–Webb	W 14–6	17–4	Russ Chandler Stadium
March 21	at Notre Dame	W 18–7	18–4	Frank Eck Stadium
March 22	at Notre Dame	W 9–5	19–4	Frank Eck Stadium
March 23	at Notre Dame	W 10–2	20–4	Frank Eck Stadium
March 25	at Kennesaw State	W 15–4	21–4	Stillwell Stadium
March 27	Clemson	L 7–9	21–5	Russ Chandler Stadium
March 28	Clemson	W 18–2	22–5	Russ Chandler Stadium
March 29	Clemson	L 3–4	22–6	Russ Chandler Stadium
April 1	Mercer	W 21–5	23–6	Russ Chandler Stadium
April 4	at Stanford	W 9–8	24–6	Klein Field at Sunken Diamond
April 5	at Stanford	W 10–3	25–6	Sunken Diamond
April 6	at Stanford	W 18–2	26–6	Sunken Diamond
April 8	Auburn	L 8–9	26–7	Russ Chandler Stadium
April 11	Cal	W 8–5	27-7	Russ Chandler Stadium
April 12	Cal	W 15–5	28-7	Russ Chandler Stadium
April 13	Cal	W 4–3	29-7	Russ Chandler Stadium
April 15	Georgia	L 2–5	29-8	Truist Park
April 18	at Miami	L 2–4	29-9	Alex Rodriguez Park
April 19	at Miami	L 2–7	29-10	Alex Rodriguez Park
April 20	at Miami	L 2-10	29-11	Alex Rodriguez Park
April 22	at Auburn	L 0-1	29-12	Plainsman Park
April 25	Virginia	L 9-12	29-13	Russ Chandler Stadium
April 26	Virginia	L 5-6	29-14	Russ Chandler Stadium
April 27	Virginia	W 7-6	30-14	Russ Chandler Stadium
May 2	Western Carolina	W 13-5	31-14	Russ Chandler Stadium
May 3	Western Carolina	W 4-2	32-14	Russ Chandler Stadium
May 4	Western Carolina	W 13-0	33-14	Russ Chandler Stadium
May 6	Georgia Southern	W 8-5	34-14	Russ Chandler Stadium
May 7	Mercer	W 4-3	35-14	OrthoGeorgia Park
May 9	Louisville	L 2-16	35-15	Russ Chandler Stadium
May 11	Louisville	W 6-0	36-15	Russ Chandler Stadium
May 11	Louisville	W 2-1	37-15	Russ Chandler Stadium
May 15	at Duke	W 7-6	38-15	Jack Coombs Field
May 16	at Duke	L 4-14	38-16	Jack Coombs Field
May 17	at Duke	W 8-2	39-16	Jack Coombs Field
May 22	Cal (ACC Tourney)	W 10-3	40-16	Durham Bulls Athletic Park
May 24	Clemson(ACC Tourney)	L 4-9	40-17	Durham Bulls Athletic Park
May 30	Western Kentucky	W 9-2	41-17	Swayze Field
May 31	Murray State	L 11-13	41-18	Swayze Field
June 1	Ole Miss	L 9-11	41-19	Swayze Field

== Rankings ==
Ranking movements Legend: ██ Increase in ranking ██ Decrease in ranking — = Not ranked
	Week																		
Poll	Pre	1	2	3	4	5	6	7	8	9	10	11	12	13	14	15	16	17	Final
Coaches'	—	—*	—	—	—	—	25	22	18	13	22	—	—	—	16	17			
Baseball America	—	—	—	—	—	—	—	—	20	13	25	—	—	—	19	19*			
NCBWA†	—	—	—	—	—	—	—	—	21	14	—	—	—	—	24	25			
D1Baseball	—	—	—	—	—	—	25	25	18	14	24	—	—	—	16	18			

† NCBWA ranks 30 teams in their preseason poll, but only ranks 25 teams weekly during the season.
* A new poll was not released for this week, so for comparison purposes, the previous week's ranking is inserted in this week's slot.
