= 2025 California Golden Bears baseball team =

American college baseball season

2025 California Golden Bears baseball
- Conference: Atlantic Coast Conference
- Record: 24–31 (9–21 ACC)
- Head coach: Mike Neu (8th season)
- Assistant coaches: Chris Bodishbaugh (3rd season); Chad Highberger (5th season)
- Hitting coach: Brett Wallace
- Home stadium: Evans Diamond

2025 Atlantic Coast Conference baseball standings
| | Conf. | | | | Overall |
| Team | W | | L | PCT | W | | L | PCT |
|---|---|---|---|---|---|---|---|---|
| No. 18 Georgia Tech ‍†‍‍^{y} | 19 | – | 11 | .633 | 41 | – | 19 | .683 |
| No. 7 Florida State ‍‍‍^{y} | 17 | – | 10 | .630 | 41 | – | 14 | .745 |
| No. 1 North Carolina ‍‍‡‍^{y} | 18 | – | 11 | .621 | 46 | – | 13 | .780 |
| NC State ‍‍‍^{y} | 17 | – | 11 | .607 | 35 | – | 21 | .625 |
| No. 14 Clemson ‍‍‍^{y} | 18 | – | 12 | .600 | 45 | – | 18 | .714 |
| Virginia ‍‍‍ | 16 | – | 11 | .593 | 32 | – | 18 | .640 |
| Duke ‍‍‍^{y} | 17 | – | 13 | .567 | 40 | – | 19 | .678 |
| Wake Forest ‍‍‍^{y} | 16 | – | 14 | .533 | 39 | – | 22 | .639 |
| Miami (FL) ‍‍‍^{y} | 15 | – | 14 | .517 | 34 | – | 26 | .567 |
| Louisville ‍‍‍^{y} | 15 | – | 15 | .500 | 39 | – | 21 | .650 |
| Notre Dame ‍‍‍ | 14 | – | 16 | .467 | 32 | – | 21 | .604 |
| Virginia Tech ‍‍‍ | 12 | – | 18 | .400 | 31 | – | 25 | .554 |
| Stanford ‍‍‍ | 11 | – | 19 | .367 | 27 | – | 25 | .519 |
| Boston College ‍‍‍ | 11 | – | 19 | .367 | 28 | – | 29 | .491 |
| Pittsburgh ‍‍‍ | 10 | – | 20 | .333 | 28 | – | 27 | .509 |
| California ‍‍‍ | 9 | – | 21 | .300 | 24 | – | 31 | .436 |
† – Conference champion ‡ – Tournament champion y – Invited to the NCAA Tournament; As of June 6, 2025; Rankings from D1Baseball

The 2025 California Golden Bears baseball team represents the University of California, Berkeley in the 2025 NCAA Division I baseball season. The Golden Bears play their home games at Evans Diamond. This is their first season as a member of the Atlantic Coast Conference. They are led by head coach Mike Neu, in his 8th season at Cal.

During the 2025 season, Cal completed its first ever away series sweep of rival Stanford. Cal also played its first ever ACC series against Duke.

== Previous season ==
The 2024 California Golden Bears baseball team posted a 36-19 (17–13) season record. The Bears swept No. 5 Oregon State at home, and finished the regular season by winning 8 of their last 9 games. The Bears also made it to the semi-finals in the 2024 Pac-12 Conference baseball tournament, but did not earn a berth into the 2024 NCAA Division I baseball tournament.

== Preseason ==
=== Coaches poll ===
ACC coaches poll
| Predicted finish | Team | Votes (1st place) |
| 1 | Virginia | 251 (13) |
| 2 | Florida State | 230 (2) |
| 3 | North Carolina | 217 |
| 4 | Clemson | 214 (1) |
| 5 | Duke | 182 |
| 6 | Wake Forest | 171 |
| 7 | NC State | 168 |
| 8 | Stanford | 143 |
| 9 | Louisville | 128 |
| 10 | Georgia Tech | 113 |
| 11 | Miami (FL) | 87 |
| 12 | Virginia Tech | 85 |
| 13 | California | 60 |
| 14 | Pitt | 52 |
| 15 | Notre Dame | 44 |
| 16 | Boston College | 31 |

=== Roster ===
2025 California Golden Bears baseball team
Players
Coaches

| # | Pos. | Name | B/T | Height | Weight | Year | Home town |
|---|---|---|---|---|---|---|---|
| 1 | INF | Jarren Advincula | L/R | 5 ft 11 in (1.8 m) | 200 lb (91 kg) | So | (California) Santa Clara |
| 2 | INF | Cade Campbell | R/R | 6 ft 1 in (1.85 m) | 185 lb (84 kg) | Jr | (California) Lodi |
| 3 | OF | Seth Gwynn | R/R | 6 ft 0 in (1.83 m) | 200 lb (91 kg) | Sr | (California) Concord |
| 4 | INF | Max Handron | L/R | 5 ft 11 in (1.8 m) | 185 lb (84 kg) | Sr | (California) Glen Ellen |
| 5 | RHP | Austin Turkington | R/R | 6 ft 1 in (1.85 m) | 210 lb (95 kg) | Jr | (California) Los Gatos |
| 6 | OF | Ethan Kodama | L/R | 6 ft 2 in (1.88 m) | 185 lb (84 kg) | Fr | (California) West Hills |
| 8 | INF | Carl Schmidt | R/R | 5 ft 11 in (1.8 m) | 185 lb (84 kg) | Fr | (California) Petaluma |
| 9 | C | Nico Button | L/R | 5 ft 10 in (1.78 m) | 190 lb (86 kg) | Sr | (California) San Mateo |
| 10 | INF | PJ Moutzouridis | R/R | 6 ft 1 in (1.85 m) | 185 lb (84 kg) | So | (California) San Jose |
| 14 | INF | Elijah Clayton | R/R | 5 ft 10 in (1.78 m) | 180 lb (82 kg) | Fr | (California) Westlake Village |
| 15 | UTL | Jacob French | L/R | 6 ft 1 in (1.85 m) | 205 lb (93 kg) | So | (California) Benicia |
| 16 | RHP | Tucker Bougie | L/R | 6 ft 6 in (1.98 m) | 225 lb (102 kg) | Sr | (California) Mill Valley |
| 17 | C | Ryan Tayman | R/R | 6 ft 3 in (1.91 m) | 210 lb (95 kg) | So | (California) Grover Beach |
| 18 | INF | Jeff Hoffman | R/R | 6 ft 3 in (1.91 m) | 230 lb (104 kg) | Sr | (California) Salida |
| 19 | RHP | Ryan Spalliero | R/R | 6 ft 0 in (1.83 m) | 180 lb (82 kg) | Jr | (California) Fresno |
| 21 | RHP | Lucas Alaniz | R/R | 6 ft 2 in (1.88 m) | 200 lb (91 kg) | Sr | (California) Waterford |
| 22 | C | Alex Birge | L/R | 6 ft 0 in (1.83 m) | 205 lb (93 kg) | Jr | (Kansas) Olathe |
| 23 | UTL | Jack Johnston | R/R | 5 ft 11 in (1.8 m) | 195 lb (88 kg) | Sr | (California) Del Mar |
| 24 | RHP | JJ Hollis | R/R | 6 ft 4 in (1.93 m) | 225 lb (102 kg) | So | (California) Laguna Niguel |
| 25 | OF | Ryan Limerick | L/L | 6 ft 1 in (1.85 m) | 200 lb (91 kg) | Fr | (California) Studio City |
| 26 | RHP | Kaden Taque | L/R | 6 ft 1 in (1.85 m) | 215 lb (98 kg) | So | (California) Porter Ranch |
| 27 | UTL | Joey Donnelly | L/R | 6 ft 2 in (1.88 m) | 210 lb (95 kg) | Sr | (California) Alamo |
| 28 | INF | Cole Tremain | R/R | 6 ft 1 in (1.85 m) | 200 lb (91 kg) | Sr | (California) Folsom |
| 29 | RHP | Miles Tenscher | R/R | 6 ft 1 in (1.85 m) | 200 lb (91 kg) | Fr | (California) Yountville |
| 30 | UTL | Jake Lavin | L/R | 6 ft 0 in (1.83 m) | 195 lb (88 kg) | Fr | (California) Laguna Beach |
| 31 | UTL | Kalen Applefield | R/R | 6 ft 1 in (1.85 m) | 205 lb (93 kg) | Fr | (California) Carlsbad |
| 33 | RHP | JM Harduvel | L/R | 6 ft 6 in (1.98 m) | 235 lb (107 kg) | Fr | (California) Huntington Beach |
| 34 | RHP | Cole Clark | R/R | 5 ft 10 in (1.78 m) | 185 lb (84 kg) | Jr | (California) Burbank |
| 35 | RHP | Jake Guardiancic | R/R | 6 ft 5 in (1.96 m) | 225 lb (102 kg) | Sr | (California) Brentwood |
| 36 | OF | Matthew Thomas | R/R | 6 ft 3 in (1.91 m) | 210 lb (95 kg) | So | (California) Garden Grove |
| 38 | INF | Dominic Smaldino | R/R | 6 ft 6 in (1.98 m) | 230 lb (104 kg) | So | (California) Ladera Ranch |
| 43 | RHP | Max Murray | R/R | 6 ft 0 in (1.83 m) | 195 lb (88 kg) | Fr | (California) San Diego |
| 44 | INF | Jordy Lopez | L/L | 5 ft 10 in (1.78 m) | 175 lb (79 kg) | Fr | (California) Elk Grove |
| 45 | RHP | Kyle Connelly | R/R | 5 ft 10 in (1.78 m) | 220 lb (100 kg) | Fr | (California) Oakley |
| 46 | RHP | Gavin Eddy | R/R | 6 ft 5 in (1.96 m) | 225 lb (102 kg) | Fr | (California) Claremont |
| 48 | RHP | Ethan Foley | R/R | 6 ft 3 in (1.91 m) | 220 lb (100 kg) | So | (California) Lancaster |
| 51 | LHP | David Shaw | L/L | 6 ft 7 in (2.01 m) | 205 lb (93 kg) | Sr | (Texas) Houston |
| 52 | RHP | Quinn Larson | R/R | 6 ft 5 in (1.96 m) | 225 lb (102 kg) | So | (California) Gilroy |
| 55 | LHP | Logan Piper | L/L | 5 ft 11 in (1.8 m) | 190 lb (86 kg) | Sr | (California) Vacaville |
| 87 | RHP | Oliver de la Torre | R/R | 6 ft 4 in (1.93 m) | 225 lb (102 kg) | So | (California) Pleasanton |
| 98 | RHP | Spencer Dessart | R/R | 6 ft 2 in (1.88 m) | 190 lb (86 kg) | Jr | (New York (state)) Bronxville |

Head coach

Mike Neu

Assistant coach(es)

Chris Bodishbaugh
Chad Highberger

Legend

- (C) Team captain
- (S) Suspended
- (I) Ineligible
- Injured
- Current redshirt

Roster
Last update: February 27, 2025

== Offseason ==
=== 2024 MLB draft ===
2024 MLB draft class
| Round | Pick | Overall pick | Player | Position | MLB team | Source |
|---|---|---|---|---|---|---|
| CB | 6 | 39 | Caleb Lomavita | C | Washington Nationals | |
| 4 | 1 | 104 | Rodney Green Jr. | CF | Oakland Athletics | |
| 12 | 23 | 368 | Christian Becerra | P | Minnesota Twins | |
| 17 | 21 | 516 | Andres Galan | P | Tampa Bay Rays | |

== Game log ==
2025 California Golden Bears game log (24–31)
Regular Season: 22–30 (Home: 12–18; Away: 10–12)

February: 5–4 (Home: 5–4; Away: 0–0)
| Date | TV | Rank | Opponent | Stadium | Score | Win | Loss | Save | Attend | Overall | ACC |
|---|---|---|---|---|---|---|---|---|---|---|---|
| February 14 | ACCNX | | Nevada* | Evans Diamond; Berkeley, CA | 14–1 | **Turkington** | Fosher | — | 483 | 1–0 | – |
| February 15 | ACCNX | | Nevada* | Evans Diamond | 11–3 | **Clark** | Castro | — | 632 | 2–0 | – |
| February 16 | ACCNX | | Nevada* | Evans Diamond | 1–10 | Burfield | **de la Torre** | — | 626 | 2–1 | – |
| February 17 | ACCNX | | Nevada* | Evans Diamond | 8–0 | **Foley** | Dobie | **Tremain** | 609 | 3–1 | – |
| February 21 | ACCNX | | Houston* | Evans Diamond | 4–6 | Dollar | **Turkington** | Roman | 457 | 3–2 | – |
| February 22 | ACCNX | | Houston* | Evans Diamond | 5–1 | **Eddy** | Schmitz | **Clark** | 560 | 4–2 | – |
| February 23 | ACCNX | | Houston* | Evans Diamond | 4–7 | Drezek | **de la Torre** | Roman | 555 | 4–3 | – |
| February 26 | ACCNX | | Cal State Bakersfield* | Evans Diamond | 6–5 (11) | **Tremain** | Riley | — | 339 | 5–3 | – |
| February 28 | ACCNX | | Santa Clara* | Evans Diamond | 3–5 | Gomez | **Turkington** | Bayles | 459 | 5–4 | – |

March: 10–8 (Home: 2–3; Away: 8–5)
| Date | TV | Rank | Opponent | Stadium | Score | Win | Loss | Save | Attend | Overall | ACC |
|---|---|---|---|---|---|---|---|---|---|---|---|
| March 1 | ACCNX | | Santa Clara* | Evans Diamond | 2–4 | Martinez | **Eddy** | Wooster | 476 | 5–5 | – |
| March 2 | ESPN+ | | at Santa Clara* | Stephen Schott Stadium; Santa Clara, CA | 19–3 (7) | **Foley** | Gillmore | **Dessart** | 550 | 6–5 | – |
| March 3 | ESPN+ | | at Santa Clara* | Stephen Schott Stadium | 0–9 | Stewart | **Tremain** | — | 296 | 6–6 | – |
| March 7 | ACCNX | | at Duke | Jack Coombs Field; Durham, NC | 14–1 (7) | **Turkington** | Johnson | — | 341 | 7–6 | 1–0 |
| March 8 | ACCNX | | at Duke | Jack Coombs Field | 2–6 | Easterly | **Shaw** | — | 844 | 7–7 | 1–1 |
| March 9 | ACCNX | | at Duke | Jack Coombs Field | 3–7 | Calvert | **Dessart** | — | 494 | 7–8 | 1–2 |
| March 11 | ACCNX | | Utah* | Evans Diamond | 9–4 | **de la Torre** | Diamant | **Piper** | 441 | 8–8 | 1–2 |
| March 14 | ACCNX | | No. 23 Virginia | Evans Diamond | 6–1 | **Turkington** | Woolfolk | — | 421 | 9–8 | 2–2 |
| March 15 | ACCNX | | No. 23 Virginia | Evans Diamond | 8–10 | Koenen | **Shaw** | Lanzendorfer | 610 | 9–9 | 2–3 |
| March 16 | ACCNX | | No. 23 Virginia | Evans Diamond | 5–11 | Blanco | **Foley** | — | 553 | 9–10 | 2–4 |
| March 18 | ESPN+ | | at Saint Mary's* | Louis Guisto Field; Moraga, CA | 13–7 | **Tremain** | Santiago | — | 257 | 10–10 | 2–4 |
| March 21 | ACCNX | | at No. 14 Stanford | Sunken Diamond; Stanford, CA | 13–3 (7) | **Turkington** | Scott | — | 1,667 | 11–10 | 3–4 |
| March 22 | ACCNX | | at No. 14 Stanford | Sunken Diamond | 13–4 | **Eddy** | Lim | — | 2,147 | 12–10 | 4–4 |
| March 23 | ACCNX | | at No. 14 Stanford | Sunken Diamond | 6–5 (10) | **Tremain** | O'Harran | — | 2,726 | 13–10 | 5–4 |
| March 25 | ESPN+ | | at San Francisco* | Max Ulrich Field; San Francisco, CA | 10–6 | **Piper** | Cabrera | — | 135 | 14–10 | 5–4 |
| March 28 | ACCNX | | at No. 18 Louisville | Jim Patterson Stadium; Louisville, KY | 10–11 | Biven | **Clark** | — | 2,348 | 14–11 | 5–5 |
| March 29 | ACCNX | | at No. 18 Louisville | Jim Patterson Stadium | 14–10 | **de la Torre** | Brown | — | 2,614 | 15–11 | 6–5 |
| March 30 | ACCN | | at No. 18 Louisville | Jim Patterson Stadium | 6–13 | Starke | **Foley** | — | 2,123 | 15–12 | 6–6 |

April: 3–15 (Home: 2–8; Away: 1–7)
| Date | TV | Rank | Opponent | Stadium | Score | Win | Loss | Save | Attend | Overall | ACC |
|---|---|---|---|---|---|---|---|---|---|---|---|
| April 1 | ESPN+ | | at Sacramento State* | John Smith Field; Sacramento, CA | 6–5 | **Tremain** | Brown | — | 521 | 16–12 | 6–6 |
| April 4 | ACCNX | | No. 6 Clemson | Evans Diamond | 4–6 | Knaak | **Turkington** | Mahlstedt | 1,163 | 16–13 | 6–7 |
| April 5 | ACCNX | | No. 6 Clemson | Evans Diamond | 3–13 (7) | Darden | **Eddy** | — | 1,224 | 16–14 | 6–8 |
| April 6 | ACCNX | | No. 6 Clemson | Evans Diamond | 3–4 | Titsworth | **Tremain** | Mahlstedt | 1,352 | 16–15 | 6–9 |
| April 7 | ACCNX | | Pacific* | Evans Diamond | 14–8 | **Foley** | Revay | — | 319 | 17–15 | 6–9 |
| April 11 | ACCNX | | at No. 18 Georgia Tech | Russ Chandler Stadium; Atlanta, GA | 5–8 | McKee | **Turkington** | Patel | 2,455 | 17–16 | 6–10 |
| April 12 | ACCNX | | at No. 18 Georgia Tech | Russ Chandler Stadium | 5–15 (8) | Jones | **Shaw** | — | 2,584 | 17–17 | 6–11 |
| April 13 | ACCNX | | at No. 18 Georgia Tech | Russ Chandler Stadium | 3–4 | Paden | **Tremain** | Patel | 1,670 | 17–18 | 6–12 |
| April 15 | ACCNX | | Fresno State* | Evans Diamond | 9–2 | **Eddy** | Patrick | — | 511 | 18–18 | 6–12 |
| April 17 | ACCNX | | NC State | Evans Diamond | 0–9 | Fritton | **Shaw** | Shaffner | 616 | 18–19 | 6–13 |
| April 18 | ACCNX | | NC State | Evans Diamond | 6–7 | Nance | **Tremain** | — | 1,290 | 18–20 | 6–14 |
| April 19 | ACCNX | | NC State | Evans Diamond | 2–5 | Marohn | **de la Torre** | Dudan | 729 | 18–21 | 6–15 |
| April 21 | ACCNX | | Saint Mary's* | Evans Diamond | 4–10 | Delvecchio | **Eddy** | — | 421 | 18–22 | 6–15 |
| April 25 | ACCNX | | at Notre Dame | Frank Eck Stadium; South Bend, IN | 1–8 | Radel | **Turkington** | — | 357 | 18–23 | 6–16 |
| April 26 | ACCNX | | at Notre Dame | Frank Eck Stadium | 0–10 (7) | Fox | **de la Torre** | — | 637 | 18–24 | 6–17 |
| April 27 | ACCNX | | at Notre Dame | Frank Eck Stadium | 5–6 | Reeth | **Tremain** | McDonough | 667 | 18–25 | 6–18 |
| April 29 | ACCNX | | at San Francisco* | Evans Diamond | 9–10 | Calia | **Bougie** | — | 539 | 18–26 | 6–18 |
| April 30 | Mountain West Network | | at San Jose State* | Excite Ballpark; San Jose, CA | 5–14 | Cushing | **Eddy** | Calzadiaz | 347 | 18–27 | 6–18 |

May: 4–3 (Home: 3–3; Away: 1–0)
| Date | TV | Rank | Opponent | Stadium | Score | Win | Loss | Save | Attend | Overall | ACC |
|---|---|---|---|---|---|---|---|---|---|---|---|
| May 6 | ESPN+ | | at Pacific* | Klein Family Field; Stockton, CA | 13–3 (8) | **Spalliero** | Souza | — | 850 | 19–27 | 6–18 |
| May 9 | ACCNX | | No. 2 Florida State | Evans Diamond | 2–8 | Arnold | **Foley** | — | 1,106 | 19–28 | 6–19 |
| May 10 | ACCNX | | No. 2 Florida State | Evans Diamond | 5–0 | **Gavin** | Volini | — | 992 | 20–28 | 7–19 |
| May 11 | ACCNX | | No. 2 Florida State | Evans Diamond | 1–5 | Mendes | **Tremain** | Charles | 706 | 20–29 | 7–20 |
| May 15 | ACCNX | | Boston College | Evans Diamond | 8–6 | **Lopez** | Soares | — | 531 | 21–29 | 8–20 |
| May 16 | ACCNX | | Boston College | Evans Diamond | 9–10 | Kwiatkowski | **Taque** | Howanitz | 567 | 21–30 | 8–21 |
| May 17 | ACCNX | | Boston College | Evans Diamond | 4–3 | **Alaniz** | Gonzalez | — | 878 | 22–30 | 9–21 |

Postseason: 2–1

ACC tournament: 2–1
| Date | TV | Rank | Opponent | Stadium | Score | Win | Loss | Save | Attend | Overall | ACC Tournament |
|---|---|---|---|---|---|---|---|---|---|---|---|
| May 20 | ACCN | (16) | (9) Miami | Durham Bulls Athletic Park; Durham, NC | 12–2 (8) | **de la Torre** | Hugus | — | 1,721 | 23–30 | 1–0 |
| May 21 | ACCN | (16) | (8) Wake Forest | Durham Bulls Athletic Park | 14–12 | **Shaw** | Lunceford | **Piper** | 2,216 | 24–30 | 2–0 |
| May 22 | ACCN | (16) | (1) No. 16 Georgia Tech | Durham Bulls Athletic Park | 3–10 | McKee | **Hollis** | — | 2,235 | 24–31 | 2–1 |

- Win
- Loss
- Postponement
- Bold: Golden Bears team member
- Rankings from D1 Baseball.
- (#) Tournament seedings in parentheses.
- * indicates a non-conference game.
