= 2025 Stanford Cardinal baseball team =

American college baseball season

2025 Stanford Cardinal baseball
- Conference: Atlantic Coast Conference
- Record: 27–25 (11–19 ACC)
- Head coach: David Esquer (8th season)
- Assistant coaches: Thomas Eager (8th season); Steve Rodriguez (6th season); Andre Mercurio (4th season)
- Home stadium: Klein Field at Sunken Diamond

2025 Atlantic Coast Conference baseball standings
	Conf.				Overall
Team	W		L	PCT	W		L	PCT
No. 18 Georgia Tech ‍†‍‍^{y}	19	–	11	.633	41	–	19	.683
No. 7 Florida State ‍‍‍^{y}	17	–	10	.630	41	–	14	.745
No. 1 North Carolina ‍‍‡‍^{y}	18	–	11	.621	46	–	13	.780
NC State ‍‍‍^{y}	17	–	11	.607	35	–	21	.625
No. 14 Clemson ‍‍‍^{y}	18	–	12	.600	45	–	18	.714
Virginia ‍‍‍	16	–	11	.593	32	–	18	.640
Duke ‍‍‍^{y}	17	–	13	.567	40	–	19	.678
Wake Forest ‍‍‍^{y}	16	–	14	.533	39	–	22	.639
Miami (FL) ‍‍‍^{y}	15	–	14	.517	34	–	26	.567
Louisville ‍‍‍^{y}	15	–	15	.500	39	–	21	.650
Notre Dame ‍‍‍	14	–	16	.467	32	–	21	.604
Virginia Tech ‍‍‍	12	–	18	.400	31	–	25	.554
Stanford ‍‍‍	11	–	19	.367	27	–	25	.519
Boston College ‍‍‍	11	–	19	.367	28	–	29	.491
Pittsburgh ‍‍‍	10	–	20	.333	28	–	27	.509
California ‍‍‍	9	–	21	.300	24	–	31	.436
† – Conference champion ‡ – Tournament champion y – Invited to the NCAA Tournament; As of June 6, 2025; Rankings from D1Baseball

The 2025 Stanford Cardinal baseball team represents Stanford University in the 2025 NCAA Division I baseball season. The Cardinal play their home games at Klein Field at Sunken Diamond under eighth year coach David Esquer. This is their first year in the ACC.

== Previous season ==
The Cardinal finished eighth in their final year of the Pac-12 Conference. They finished with an overall record of 22–33 and a conference record of 11–19. In the Pac-12 Tournament, the 8 seed Cardinal was placed in Pool B with #2 seed Oregon State and #5 seed Arizona State. The Cardinal would beat Arizona State 8–7 and beat Oregon State 2–1 to advance to the semi-finals. In the semi-finals the Cardinal would face off against #1 Seed Arizona but lost 3–6 to end their season.

=== 2024 MLB draft ===
The Cardinal had one player drafted in the 2024 MLB draft.

Player	Position	Round	Overall	MLB Team
Malcolm Moore	Catcher	1	30	Texas Rangers

== Departures ==
All Offseason Departures
Name	Number	Pos.	Height	Weight	Year	Hometown	Notes
Jade Bruno	23	Pitcher	6’4”	222 lbs	Senior	Wellington, FL	Graduated
Owen Cobb	1	Shortstop	6’3”	195 lbs	Graduate Student	Seattle, WA	Graduated
Tommy O'Rourke	37	Pitcher	6’2”	218 lbs	Senior	Morristown, NJ	Graduated
Nathan Fleischli	20	Pitcher	6’4”	204 lbs	Graduate Student	Atherton, CA	Graduated
Champ Hampton	15	Outfield	5’10”	208 lbs	Freshman	Ooltewah, TN	Left baseball team for football

== Incoming recruits ==
2025 Stanford Recruits
Name	B/T	Pos.	Height	Weight	Hometown	High School	Source
Charlie Bates	L/R	SS	6’1”	185 lbs	Palo Alto, CA	Palo Alto High School	
Tatum Marsh	R/R	OF	6’1”	185 lbs	San Jose, CA	Valley Christian Schools	
Cohen Gomez	R/R	P	6’4”	215 lbs	Anaheim Hills, CA	Canyon High School	
Sammy Petrocelli	R/R	P	6’2”	215 lbs	Los Angeles, CA	Notre Dame High School	
Liam Golden	R/R	P	6’4”	200 lbs	Sacramento, CA	Christian Brothers High School	
JJ Moran	R/R	SS	6’1”	195 lbs	Carlsbad, CA	San Marcos High School	
Dominic Panella	R/R	P	6’1”	190 lbs	San Jose, CA	Leigh High School	
Austin Steeves	L/L	P	6’0”	180 lbs	Petaluma, CA	Petaluma High School	
Nathan Stiveson	R/R	SS	6’1”	197 lbs	Redondo Beach, CA	Redondo Union High School	
Parker Warner	R/R	P	6’1”	185 lbs	Livermore, CA	Granada High School	
Chase Klemke	R/R	SS	5’11”	160 lbs	San Diego, CA	Torrey Pines High School	
Daxton Lindgren	R/R	2B	5’7”	134 lbs	Layton, UT	Clearfield High School	
Rintaro Sasaki	L/R	1B	6’0”	275 lbs	Hanamaki, Iwate, Japan	Hanamaki Higashi High School	

== Personnel ==
=== Roster ===
2025 Stanford Cardinal roster
Pitchers: 12 – Toran O'Harran – Junior; 18 – Kassius Thomas – Junior; 19 – Joey Volchko – Sophomore; 24 – Aidan Keenan – Sophomore; 25 – Nick Dugan – Junior; 26 – Sam Garewal – Junior; 28 – Matt Scott – Junior; 30 – Ryan Speshyock – Sophomore; 31 – Sammy Petrocelli – Freshman; 34 – Trevor Moore – Junior; 36 – Ty Uber – Senior; 37 – Dominic Panella – Freshman; 38 – Jack Svinth – Sophomore; 40 – Ben Reimers – Sophomore; 41 – Liam Golden – Freshman; 42 – Christian Lim – Sophomore; 45 – Cohen Gomez – Freshman; 49 – Austin Steeves – Freshman	Catchers: 21 – Charlie Saum – Senior; Infielders: 1 – JJ Moran – Freshman; 2 – Temo Becerra – Senior; 3 – Rintaro Sasaki – Freshman; 5 – Trevor Haskins – Senior; 6 – Jimmy Nati – Junior; 10 – Charlie Bates – Freshman; 14 – Sebastian David – Sophomore; 16 – Brandon Larson – Junior; 33 – Gabe Springer – Junior; 39 – Jake Sapien – Senior; 43 – Nate Stiveson – Freshman	Outfielders: 4 – Tatum Marsh – Freshman; 13 – Ethan Hott – Junior; 22 – Cort MacDonald – Junior; 27 – Brady Reynolds – Sophomore; 47 – Sanborn Campbell – Senior; Utility: 11 – Luke Lavin (C/1B) – Sophomore; 23 – Parker Warner (P/OF) – Freshman; 44 – Brett Blair (OF/C) – Senior

=== Coaching staff ===
2025 Stanford Cardinal coaching staff
Name	Position
David Esquer	Clarke and Elizabeth Nelson Director of Baseball
Thomas Eager	Kathy Wolff Assistant Baseball Coach
Steve Rodriguez	Assistant Coach
Andre Mercurio	Assistant Coach

== Schedule and results ==
Legend
	Stanford win
	Stanford loss
	Postponement
**Bold**	Stanford team member

2025 Stanford Cardinal baseball game log (27–25)
Regular season (27–24)
February (9–0)

Date	Opponent	Rank	Site/stadium	Score	Win	Loss	Save	TV	Attendance	Overall record	Acc record
Feb 15	at Cal State Fullerton*		Goodwin Field • Fullerton, CA	**W** 13–1^{7}	**Scott** (1–0)	Blood (0–1)		ESPN+	1,424	1–0	
Feb 15	at Cal State Fullerton*		Goodwin Field • Fullerton, CA	**W** 6–3	**Lim** (1–0)	Negrete (0–1)	**Uber** (1)	ESPN+	1,804	2–0	
Feb 16	at Cal State Fullerton*		Goodwin Field • Fullerton, CA	**W** 14–11	**Speshyock** (1–0)	Goff (0–1)	**Keenan** (1)	ESPN+	1,907	3–0	
Feb 17	at Cal State Fullerton*		Goodwin Field • Fullerton, CA	**W** 9–7^{10}	**Keenan** (1–0)	Wright (0–1)		ESPN+	1,037	4–0	
Feb 21	Washington*		Klein Field at Sunken Diamond • Stanford, CA	**W** 2–0	**Scott** (2–0)	Banks (1–1)	**Keenan** (2)	ACCNX	1,553	5–0	
Feb 22	Washington*		Klein Field at Sunken Diamond • Stanford, CA	**W** 11–9	**Dugan** (1–0)	Nichols (0–1)	**Keenan** (3)	ACCNX	1,998	6–0	
Feb 23	Washington*		Klein Field at Sunken Diamond • Stanford, CA	**W** 9–5	**Moore** (1–0)	Jase (0–1)	**Uber** (2)	ACCNX	1,572	7–0	
Feb 24	Washington*		Klein Field at Sunken Diamond • Stanford, CA	**W** 7–3	**Reimers** (1–0)	Gilbert (0–1)		ACCNX	1,058	8–0	
Feb 28	Xavier*		Klein Field at Sunken Diamond • Stanford, CA	**W** 10–2	**Scott** (3–0)	Hooker (0–1)		ACCNX	1,116	9–0	

March (7–9)

Date	Opponent	Rank	Site/stadium	Score	Win	Loss	Save	TV	Attendance	Overall record	ACC record
Mar 1	Xavier*		Klein Field at Sunken Diamond • Stanford, CA	**L** 4–5	Peich (1–0)	**Lim** (1–1)	Lambdin (1)	ACCNX	1,475	9–1	
Mar 1	Xavier*		Klein Field at Sunken Diamond • Stanford, CA	**W** 8–3	**Volchko** (1–0)	Nobe (1–1)	**Keenan** (4)	tv	1,615	10–1	
Mar 2	Xavier*		Klein Field at Sunken Diamond • Stanford, CA	**L** 3–11	Weber (1–2)	**Warner** (0–1)		ACCNX	1,190	10–2	
Mar 7	at No. 4 North Carolina		Boshamer Stadium • Chapel Hill, NC	**W** 13–9	**Uber** (1–0)	DeCaro (3–1)		ACCNX	3,075	11–2	1–0
Mar 8	at No. 4 North Carolina		Boshamer Stadium • Chapel Hill, NC	**L** 1–11^{7}	Knapp (2–0)	Lim (1–2)		ACCNX	3,393	11–3	1–1
Mar 9	at No. 4 North Carolina		Boshamer Stadium • Chapel Hill, NC	**W** 7–0	**Volchko** (2–0)	Haugh (2–1)		ACCNX	2,906	12–3	2–1
Mar 14	Duke	No. 18	Klein Field at Sunken Diamond • Stanford, CA	**W** 5–1	**Scott** (4–0)	Easterly (2–1)		ACCNX	1,521	13–3	3–1
Mar 15	Duke	No. 18	Klein Field at Sunken Diamond • Stanford, CA	**W** 11–1^{8}	**Lim** (2–2)	Healy (1–2)		ACCNX	1,776	14–3	4–1
Mar 16	Duke	No. 18	Klein Field at Sunken Diamond • Stanford, CA	**W** 10–5	**O'Harran** (1–0)	Nard (1–1)		ACCNX	2,041	15–3	5–1
Mar 21	California	No. 14	Klein Field at Sunken Diamond • Stanford, CA	**L** 3–13^{7}	Turkington (4–2)	**Scott** (4–1)		ACCNX	1,667	15–4	5–2
Mar 22	California	No. 14	Klein Field at Sunken Diamond • Stanford, CA	**L** 4–13	Eddy (2–1)	**Lim** (2–3)		ACCNX	2,147	15–5	5–3
Mar 23	California	No. 14	Klein Field at Sunken Diamond • Stanford, CA	**L** 5–6^{10}	Tremain (3–1)	**O'Harran** (1–1)		ACCNX	2,726	15–6	5–4
Mar 24	San Jose State*	No. 20	Klein Field at Sunken Diamond • Stanford, CA	**W** 5–1	**Dugan** (2–0)	Pereria (0–1)		ACCNX	1,004	16–6	
Mar 27	at Virginia	No. 20	Davenport Field at Disharoon Park • Charlottesville, VA	**L** 8–11	Woolfolk (2–2)	O'Harran (1–2)		ACCN	3,910	16–7	5–5
Mar 28	at Virginia	No. 20	Davenport Field at Disharoon Park • Charlottesville, VA	**L** 7–13	Buchanan (1–0)	**Uber** (1–1)		ACCNX	4,354	16–8	5–6
Mar 29	at Virginia	No. 20	Davenport Field at Disharoon Park • Charlottesville, VA	**L** 8–9^{10}	Buchanan (2–0)	**Moore** (1–2)		ESPN	5,364	16–9	5–7

April (6–10)

Date	Opponent	Rank	Site/stadium	Score	Win	Loss	Save	TV	Attendance	Overall record	ACC record
Apr 1	Santa Clara*		Klein Field at Sunken Diamond • Stanford, CA	**W** 6–5^{10}	**Thomas** (1–0)	Wooster (0–2)		ACCNX	1,168	17–9	
Apr 4	No. 25 Georgia Tech		Klein Field at Sunken Diamond • Stanford, CA	**L** 6–8	Patel (8–1)	**Volchko** (2–1)		ACCNX	1,838	17–10	5–8
Apr 5	No. 25 Georgia Tech		Klein Field at Sunken Diamond • Stanford, CA	**L** 3–10	Paden (3–0)	**Keenan** (1–1)		ACCNX	1,859	17–11	5–9
Apr 6	No. 25 Georgia Tech		Klein Field at Sunken Diamond • Stanford, CA	**L** 2–18^{7}	Spivey (2–0)	**Scott** (4–2)		ACCNX	2,040	17–12	5–10
Apr 7	at UC Davis*		Klein Field at Sunken Diamond • Stanford, CA	**W** 4–0	**Dugan** (3–0)	Woolridge (0–1)		ACCNX	1,402	18–12	
Apr 11	at No. 4 Clemson		Doug Kingsmore Stadium • Clemson, SC	**L** 1–11^{7}	Knaak (6–0)	**Volchko** (2–2)		ESPNU	4,982	18–13	5–11
Apr 12	at No. 4 Clemson		Doug Kingsmore Stadium • Clemson, SC	**L** 10–11	Garris (3–0)	**Garewal** (0–1)	Mahlstedt (12)	ACCN	5,326	18–14	5–12
Apr 13	at No. 4 Clemson		Doug Kingsmore Stadium • Clemson, SC	**W** 11–6	**Scott** (5–2)	Bailey (2–1)		ACCN	4,765	19–14	6–12
Apr 18	Notre Dame		Klein Field at Sunken Diamond • Stanford, CA	**L** 3–9	Radel (4–3)	**Volchko** (2–3)	Reeth (1)	ACCNX	1,962	19–15	6–13
Apr 19	Notre Dame		Klein Field at Sunken Diamond • Stanford, CA	**L** 0–11^{7}	Fox (1–3)	**Moore** (1–3)		ACCNX	2,340	19–16	6–14
Apr 20	Notre Dame		Klein Field at Sunken Diamond • Stanford, CA	**L** 9–10	McDonough (2–0)	**Uber** (1–2)		ACCNX	1,582	19–17	6–15
Apr 21	UC Davis*		Klein Field at Sunken Diamond • Stanford, CA	**W** 11–1^{7}	**Dugan** (4–0)	Meek (0–1)		ACCNX	1,093	20–17	
Apr 25	Wake Forest		Klein Field at Sunken Diamond • Stanford, CA	**W** 7–6^{12}	**Garewal** (1–1)	Schmolke (3–1)		ACCNX	1,766	21–17	7–15
Apr 26	Wake Forest		Klein Field at Sunken Diamond • Stanford, CA	**L** 9–12	Bedford (5–3)	**Keenan** (1–2)	Bowie (1)	ACCNX	1,558	21–18	7–16
Apr 27	Wake Forest		Klein Field at Sunken Diamond • Stanford, CA	**L** 0–10	Levonas (3–1)	**Steeves** (0–1)		ACCNX	2,339	21–19	7–17
Apr 28	Sacramento State*		Klein Field at Sunken Diamond • Stanford, CA	**W** 2–1	**Dugan** (5–0)	Carey (1–2)	**Garewal** (1)	ACCNX	1,062	22–19	

May (5–5)

Date	Opponent	Rank	Site/stadium	Score	Win	Loss	Save	TV	Attendance	Overall record	ACC record
May 2	at Boston College		Eddie Pellagrini Diamond • Chestnut Hill, MA	**W** 2–0	**Volchko** (3–3)	Colarusso (1–6)	**Keenan** (5)	ACCNX	872	23–19	8–17
May 3	at Boston College		Eddie Pellagrini Diamond • Chestnut Hill, MA	**L** 2–6	Soares (3–0)	**Speshyock** (1–1)		ACCNX	778	23–20	8–18
May 4	at Boston College		Eddie Pellagrini Diamond • Chestnut Hill, MA	**W** 11–7	**Dugan** (6–0)	Kipp (3–3)		ACCNX	685	24–20	9–18
May 6	at Santa Clara*		Stephen Schott Stadium • Santa Clara, CA	**L** 6–13	Wooster (1–3)	**Speshyock** (1–2)		ESPN+	805	24–21	
May 9	Grand Canyon*		Klein Field at Sunken Diamond • Stanford, CA	**L** 3–4	Smith (1–0)	**Keenan** (1–3)	Quinn (1)	ACCNX	1,617	24–22	
May 10	Grand Canyon*		Klein Field at Sunken Diamond • Stanford, CA	**L** 6–10	Higginbottom (5–0)	**Garewal** (1–2)		ACCNX	1,513	24–23	
May 11	Grand Canyon*		Klein Field at Sunken Diamond • Stanford, CA	**W** 16–15^{10}	**Gomez** (1–0)	Bailey (2–1)		ACCNX	1,660	25–23	
May 15	at No. 13 NC State		Doak Field • Raleigh, NC	**L** 2–7	Marohn (7–3)	**Speshyock** (1–3)	Anderson (1)	ACCNX	2,631	25–24	9–19
May 16	at No. 13 NC State		Doak Field • Raleigh, NC	**W** 4–3^{10}	**Keenan** (2-3)	Dudan (2-2)		ACCNX	2,904	26–24	10–19
May 17	at No. 13 NC State		Doak Field • Raleigh, NC	**W** 6–3	**Thomas** (1-1)	Consiglio (1-4)	**Uber** (3)	ACCNX	2,924	27–24	11–19

Postseason (0–1)
ACC Tournament (0–1)

Date	Opponent (Seed)	Rank (Seed)	Site/stadium	Score	Win	Loss	Save	TV	Attendance	Overall record	Tournament record
May 20	Virginia Tech (12)	(13)	Durham Bulls Athletic Park • Durham, NC	**L** 4–7	Crowl (2–0)	**Volchko** (3–4)	Manning (1)	ACCN	2,197	27–25	0–1

Source: Rankings are based on the team's current ranking in the D1Baseball poll.

== Rankings ==
Ranking movements Legend: ██ Increase in ranking ██ Decrease in ranking — = Not ranked RV = Received votes
	Week																
Poll	Pre	1	2	3	4	5	6	7	8	9	10	11	12	13	14	15	Final
Coaches'		*	RV	18	14	14	22	RV	—	—	—	—	—	—	—	—	—
Baseball America				—	17	14	22	—	—	—	—	—	—	—	—	—	—
NCBWA†					RV	23	RV	RV	—	—	—	—	—	—	—	—	—
D1Baseball	—	—	—	—	18	14	20	—	—	—	—	—	—	—	—	—	—
Perfect Game	—	23	23	—	25	15	24	—	—	—	—	—	—	—	—	—	—

† NCBWA ranks 30 teams in their preseason poll, but only ranks 25 teams weekly during the season.
* A new poll was not released for this week, so for comparison purposes, the previous week's ranking is inserted in this week's slot.
