= 2025 Louisville Cardinals baseball team =

American college baseball season

2025 Louisville Cardinals baseball

NCAA Nashville Regional champion NCAA Louisville Super Regional champion

College World Series, 2–2
- Conference: Atlantic Coast Conference
- Record: 42–24 (15–15 ACC)
- Head coach: Dan McDonnell (19th season)
- Assistant coaches: Roger Williams (19th season); Eric Snider (11th season); Adam Vrable (11th season)
- Home stadium: Jim Patterson Stadium

2025 Atlantic Coast Conference baseball standings
	Conf.				Overall
Team	W		L	PCT	W		L	PCT
No. 24 Georgia Tech ‍†‍‍^{y}	19	–	11	.633	41	–	19	.683
No. 10 Florida State ‍‍‍^{y}	17	–	10	.630	41	–	14	.745
No. 9 North Carolina ‍‍‡‍^{y}	18	–	11	.621	46	–	13	.780
NC State ‍‍‍^{y}	17	–	11	.607	35	–	21	.625
No. 23 Clemson ‍‍‍^{y}	18	–	12	.600	45	–	18	.714
Virginia ‍‍‍	16	–	11	.593	32	–	18	.640
No. 15 Duke ‍‍‍^{y}	17	–	13	.567	40	–	19	.678
Wake Forest ‍‍‍^{y}	16	–	14	.533	39	–	22	.639
No. 16 Miami (FL) ‍‍‍^{y}	15	–	14	.517	34	–	26	.567
No. 6 Louisville ‍‍‍^{y}	15	–	15	.500	39	–	21	.650
Notre Dame ‍‍‍	14	–	16	.467	32	–	21	.604
Virginia Tech ‍‍‍	12	–	18	.400	31	–	25	.554
Stanford ‍‍‍	11	–	19	.367	27	–	25	.519
Boston College ‍‍‍	11	–	19	.367	28	–	29	.491
Pittsburgh ‍‍‍	10	–	20	.333	28	–	27	.509
California ‍‍‍	9	–	21	.300	24	–	31	.436
† – Conference champion ‡ – Tournament champion y – Invited to the NCAA Tournament; As of June 23, 2025; Rankings from D1Baseball

The 2025 Louisville Cardinals baseball team represented the University of Louisville during the 2025 NCAA Division I baseball season. The Cardinals played their home games at Jim Patterson Stadium as a member of the Atlantic Coast Conference. They were led by head coach Dan McDonnell, in his 19th year at Louisville.

For the first time since 2022, Louisville received a bid to play in the NCAA Tournament. The Cardinals received the 2 seed in the Nashville Regional hosted by the No. 1 overall seed Vanderbilt Commodores. Louisville swept the regional and advanced to host the Louisville Super Regional against the Miami Hurricanes. Louisville won the series 2–1 and advanced to the 2025 Men's College World Series for the programs sixth appearance and first since 2019. Louisville advanced to the national semifinals where they lost to Coastal Carolina.

== Previous season ==
The 2024 Louisville Cardinals baseball team finished the season 32–24, missing the NCAA Tournament for a second straight season and the third time in four years.

== 2024 MLB draft ==
The Cardinals had only two players drafted in the 2024 MLB draft for its lowest total since the 2011 MLB draft. This was the first draft under coach Dan McDonnell that a player was not taken in the first 10 rounds.

Player	Position	Round	Overall	MLB Team
Sebastian Gongora	Pitcher	11	339	Baltimore Orioles
Kaleb Corbett	Pitcher	20	606	Tampa Bay Rays

== Personnel ==
=== Roster ===
2024 Louisville Cardinals roster
Pitchers: 1 – Patrick Forbes – Junior; 8 – Jake Schweitzer – Freshman; 9 – Jack Brown – Freshman; 10 – Eli Hoyt – Junior; 11 – Ty Starke – Sophomore; 15 – Colton Hartman – Sophomore; 19 – TJ Schlageter – Sophomore; 22 – Tucker Biven – Junior; 24 – Wyatt Danilowicz – Junior; 28 – Parker Detmers – Sophomore; 29 – Peter Michael – Junior; 34 – Jared Lessman – Senior; 39 – Brandin Crawford – Freshman; 40 – Jake Gregor – Freshman; 41 – Alex Gay – Freshman; 44 – Kian Vorster – Freshman; 45 – Casen Murphy – Freshman; 46 – Justin West – Junior; 47 – Aaron England – Freshman; 50 – Brennyn Cutts – Senior; 51 – Ethan Eberle – Freshman; 52 – Coen Evrard – Freshman	Catchers: 14 – George Baker – Sophomore; 17 – Collin Mowry – Freshman; 36 – Tagger Tyson – Sophomore; Infielders: 0 – Alex Alicea – Sophomore; 4 – Tanner Shiver – Senior; 5 – Kamau Neighbors – Senior; 7 – Ethan Edinger – Junior; 20 – Jake Munroe – Junior; 26 – Nate Earley – Junior; 27 – Bayram Hot – Junior	Outfielders: 2 – Garret Pike – Senior; 16 – Michael Lippe – Junior; 18 – Griffin Crain – Freshman; 31 – Cole Crafton – Freshman; 35 – Kyle Campbell – Freshman; 42 – Eddie King Jr. – Senior; 53 – Lucas Moore – Sophomore; Utility: 13 – Tague Davis – Freshman; 25 – Matt Klein – Junior; 32 – Zion Rose – Sophomore

=== Coaching staff ===
2025 Louisville Cardinals Coaching Staff
Name	Position	Seasons at Louisville	Alma mater
Dan McDonnell	Head coach	19	The Citadel (1992)
Roger Williams	Associate head coach/Pitching	19	East Carolina (1997)
Eric Snider	Assistant Coach/recruiting coordinator	11	Northern Iowa (1987)
Adam Vrable	Assistant Coach	11	Coastal Carolina (2007)
Brian Mundorf	Director of Operations	29	American International (1992)

== Schedule and results ==
2025 Louisville Cardinals baseball game log
Regular season

February (7–1)

Date	Time (ET)	TV	Opponent	Rank	Stadium	Score	Win	Loss	Save	Attendance	Overall	ACC
February 14	8:00 p.m.	FloSports	No. 19 Texas		Globe Life Field; Arlington, TX	**W** 4–3	**Biven (1–0)**	Mercer (0–1)		8,344	1–0	–

March (13–6)

Date	Time (ET)	TV	Opponent	Rank	Stadium	Score	Win	Loss	Save	Attendance	Overall	ACC

April (11–6)

Date	Time (ET)	TV	Opponent	Rank	Stadium	Score	Win	Loss	Save	Attendance	Overall	ACC

May (4–7)

Date	Time (ET)	TV	Opponent	Rank	Stadium	Score	Win	Loss	Save	Attendance	Overall	ACC

Postseason
ACC Tournament (0–1)

Date	Time (ET)	TV	Opponent	Rank	Stadium	Score	Win	Loss	Save	Attendance	Overall	ACCT Record
May 20	5:00 p.m.	ACCN	Pittsburgh		Truist Field; Charlotte, NC	**L** 11–13	Firoved (3–4)	**Cutts** (3–1)	None	2,348	35–21	0–1

NCAA tournament Nashville Regional (3–0)

Date	Time (ET)	TV	Opponent	Rank	Stadium	Score	Win	Loss	Save	Attendance	Overall	NCAAT
May 30	2:00 p.m.	ESPN+	(3) East Tennessee State		Hawkins Field; Nashville, TN	**W** 8–3	**Forbes (3–2)**	Fink (6–5)	**Cutts** (1)	3,303	36–21	1–0
May 31	9:00 p.m.	ESPN2	(1) No. 2 Vanderbilt		Hawkins Field; Nashville, TN	**W** 3–2	**West** (2–2)	Bowker (3–5)	**Schweitzer** (1)	3,802	37–21	2–0
June 1	9:00 p.m.	ACCN	(4) Wright State		Hawkins Field; Nashville, TN	**W** 6–0	**Eberle** (6–2)	Lax (5–2)	**Danilowicz** (1)	3,210	38–21	3–0

NCAA tournament Louisvile Super Regional (2–1)

Date	Time (ET)	TV	Opponent	Rank	Stadium	Score	Win	Loss	Save	Attendance	Overall	NCAAT
June 6	3:00 p.m.	ESPN2	Miami		Jim Patterson Stadium; Louisville, KY	**W** 8–1	**Forbes** (4–2)	Ciscar (6–2)	None	5,776	39–21	4–0
June 7	11:00 a.m.	ESPN	Miami		Jim Patterson Stadium; Louisville, KY	**L** 6–9	Fischer (5–1)	**Brown** (5–5)	Walters (1)	6,066	39–22	4–1
June 8	12:00 p.m.	ESPN	Miami		Jim Patterson Stadium; Louisville, KY	**W** 3–2	**Schweitzer** (4–2)	Smith (3–1)	**Cutts** (1)	6,046	40–22	5–1

College World Series (1–1)

Date	Time (ET)	TV	Opponent	Rank	Stadium	Score	Win	Loss	Save	Attendance	Overall	NCAAT
June 13	7:00 p.m.	ESPN	(8) No. 8 Oregon State		Charles Schwab Field Omaha; Omaha, NE	**L** 3–4	Oakes (5–0)	**Schweitzer** (4–3)		24,963	40–23	5–2
June 15	2:00 p.m.	ESPN	No. 21 Arizona		Charles Schwab Field Omaha; Omaha, NE	**W** 8–3	**Biven** (4–0)	Hicks (5–2)		23,647	41–23	6–2
June 17	2:00 p.m.	ESPN	(8) No. 8 Oregon State		Charles Schwab Field Omaha; Omaha, NE							

Legend: = Win = Loss = Canceled
Bold = Louisville team member * Non-conference game

== Rankings ==
Ranking movements Legend: ██ Increase in ranking ██ Decrease in ranking — = Not ranked RV = Received votes
	Week																		
Poll	Pre	1	2	3	4	5	6	7	8	9	10	11	12	13	14	15	16	17	Final
Coaches'	—	—*	—	—	—	20	19	18	16	19	21	20	24	23	RV	RV	*	*	
Baseball America	—	—	—	—	25	15	20	14	11	11	19	17	19	23	—	*	*	*	
NCBWA†	—	—	—	—	—	—	22	22	17	21	RV	18	22	22	RV	RV			
D1Baseball	—	—	—	—	—	16	18	18	14	17	19	17	20	21	—	—	*		
Perfect Game	—	—	—	—	—	20	19	18	16	21	—	18	25	—	—	*			

† NCBWA ranks 30 teams in their preseason poll, but only ranks 25 teams weekly during the season.
* A new poll was not released for this week, so for comparison purposes, the previous week's ranking is inserted in this week's slot.
