= 2025 Florida State Seminoles baseball team =

American college baseball season

2025 Florida State Seminoles baseball

Tallahassee Regional champions

Corvallis Super Regional, 1–2
- Conference: Atlantic Coast Conference

Ranking
- Coaches: No. 9
- D1Baseball.com: No. 10
- Record: 42–16 (17–10 ACC)
- Head coach: Link Jarrett (3rd season)
- Assistant coaches: Ty Megahee (2nd season); Brad Vanderglas (2nd season)
- Pitching coach: Micah Posey (2nd season)
- Home stadium: Mike Martin Field at Dick Howser Stadium (Capacity: 6,700)

2025 Atlantic Coast Conference baseball standings
	Conf.				Overall
Team	W		L	PCT	W		L	PCT
No. 18 Georgia Tech ‍†‍‍^{y}	19	–	11	.633	41	–	19	.683
No. 7 Florida State ‍‍‍^{y}	17	–	10	.630	41	–	14	.745
No. 1 North Carolina ‍‍‡‍^{y}	18	–	11	.621	46	–	13	.780
NC State ‍‍‍^{y}	17	–	11	.607	35	–	21	.625
No. 14 Clemson ‍‍‍^{y}	18	–	12	.600	45	–	18	.714
Virginia ‍‍‍	16	–	11	.593	32	–	18	.640
Duke ‍‍‍^{y}	17	–	13	.567	40	–	19	.678
Wake Forest ‍‍‍^{y}	16	–	14	.533	39	–	22	.639
Miami (FL) ‍‍‍^{y}	15	–	14	.517	34	–	26	.567
Louisville ‍‍‍^{y}	15	–	15	.500	39	–	21	.650
Notre Dame ‍‍‍	14	–	16	.467	32	–	21	.604
Virginia Tech ‍‍‍	12	–	18	.400	31	–	25	.554
Stanford ‍‍‍	11	–	19	.367	27	–	25	.519
Boston College ‍‍‍	11	–	19	.367	28	–	29	.491
Pittsburgh ‍‍‍	10	–	20	.333	28	–	27	.509
California ‍‍‍	9	–	21	.300	24	–	31	.436
† – Conference champion ‡ – Tournament champion y – Invited to the NCAA Tournament; As of June 6, 2025; Rankings from D1Baseball

The 2025 Florida State Seminoles baseball team represented Florida State University during the 2025 NCAA Division I baseball season. The Seminoles played their home games at Mike Martin Field at Dick Howser Stadium as a member of the Atlantic Coast Conference. They were led by head baseball coach Link Jarrett, in his third year as head coach.

== Previous season ==
The 2024 Florida State Seminoles baseball team compiled a record of 49–17 overall and 17–12 in ACC play. At the end of the ACC regular season, outfielder James Tibbs III was named the Atlantic Coast Conference Baseball Player of the Year. In addition, Tibbs III and Jamie Arnold were named to the All-ACC First Team, while Cam Smith was named to the All-ACC Second Team. Marco Dinges and Jaime Ferrer were named to the All-ACC Third Team.

The Seminoles reached the championship game of the 2024 Atlantic Coast Conference Baseball Tournament before losing 4–16 to Duke in the final. Marco Dinges, Tibbs III, and Drew Faurot were all named to the ACC All-Tournament Team.

Despite not winning the ACC tournament, Florida State received an at-large berth into the 2024 NCAA Division I baseball tournament and an eighth-overall national seed, giving them the right to host both a regional and a super regional. Drawn into the Tallahassee Regional were SEC opponent Alabama, as well as fellow Floridian colleges UCF of the Big 12 and Stetson of the ASUN. In the regional, the Seminoles went a perfect 3–0, defeating Stetson in the opening game and UCF twice (Alabama went 0–2 and did not play Florida State). In the Super Regional, the Seminoles hosted Big East opponent UConn. In a best-of-three series, Florida State defeated UConn 2–0, advancing to their first College World Series since 2019.

In the College World Series, the Seminoles suffered a first-round setback, losing to Tennessee, 11–12, off of a walk-off run. Florida State proceeded to win its next two elimination games against fellow ACC opponents Virginia and North Carolina, setting up a rematch with Tennessee in the national semifinals. Needing to win twice to advance to the national championship, Florida State lost 2–7 to the Volunteers in the opening semifinal game. Tennessee ultimately went on to win the national championship. Upon the conclusion of the tournament, catcher Jaxson West and outfielder Jaime Ferrer were named to the All-Tournament Team.

== Personnel ==
=== Starters ===
Weekend Pitching Rotation
Day	Player
Friday	Jamie Arnold
Saturday	Joey Volini
Sunday	Wes Mendes

=== Roster ===
2025 Florida State Seminoles baseball team
Players
Coaches

#	Pos.	Name	B/T	Height	Weight	Year	Home town
1	INF	Alex Lodise	R/R	6 ft 1 in (1.85 m)	190 lb (86 kg)	Jr	St. Augustine, FL
2	INF	Carter McCulley	R/R	6 ft 5 in (1.96 m)	196 lb (89 kg)	Jr	Pensacola, FL
3	INF	Drew Faurot	S/R	6 ft 3 in (1.91 m)	207 lb (94 kg)	Jr	Tallahassee, FL
4	INF	Cal Fisher	R/R	6 ft 0 in (1.83 m)	207 lb (94 kg)	So	Deerfield, WI
5	OF	Chase Williams	S/R	5 ft 10 in (1.78 m)	171 lb (78 kg)	So	Elmore, AL
7	LHP	Wes Mendes	L/L	6 ft 1 in (1.85 m)	198 lb (90 kg)	So	Tampa, FL
9	OF	Gage Harrelson	L/L	6 ft 3 in (1.91 m)	177 lb (80 kg)	Jr	Warner Robins, GA
12	INF	Myles Bailey	L/R	6 ft 4 in (1.93 m)	257 lb (117 kg)	Fr	Tallhassee, FL
13	INF	Noah Sheffield	R/R	6 ft 1 in (1.85 m)	190 lb (86 kg)	Fr	Tampa, FL
14	OF	BJ Gibson	S/S	6 ft 0 in (1.83 m)	193 lb (88 kg)	Fr	Rochelle, GA
15	LHP	Connor Hults	L/L	5 ft 11 in (1.8 m)	182 lb (83 kg)	RS Sr	St. Johns, FL
16	LHP	Jamie Arnold	L/L	6 ft 1 in (1.85 m)	192 lb (87 kg)	Jr	Tampa, FL
17	LHP	Joey Volini	L/L	6 ft 4 in (1.93 m)	247 lb (112 kg)	RS Jr	Tampa, FL
18	OF	Max Williams	L/L	6 ft 2 in (1.88 m)	207 lb (94 kg)	Jr	Ormond Beach, FL
19	RHP	John Abraham	R/R	6 ft 3 in (1.91 m)	193 lb (88 kg)	So	Tampa, FL
20	C	Jaxson West	L/R	6 ft 0 in (1.83 m)	193 lb (88 kg)	Jr	Tallahassee, FL
21	C	Nathan Cmeyla	R/R	5 ft 11 in (1.8 m)	186 lb (84 kg)	RS Sr	Ashburn, VA
22	INF	Blaydon Plain	L/R	6 ft 5 in (1.96 m)	219 lb (99 kg)	Jr	Madison, FL
23	OF	Brody DeLamielleure	R/R	6 ft 1 in (1.85 m)	193 lb (88 kg)	RS Fr	St. Augustine, FL
24	RHP	Maison Martinez	R/R	6 ft 2 in (1.88 m)	246 lb (112 kg)	Jr	Lake Worth, FL
25	C	Hunter Carns	R/R	6 ft 0 in (1.83 m)	199 lb (90 kg)	Fr	Jacksonville, FL
26	RHP	Nick Greaney	R/R	6 ft 6 in (1.98 m)	245 lb (111 kg)	Jr	Dallas, TX
27	UTL	Peyton Prescott	R/R	6 ft 0 in (1.83 m)	200 lb (91 kg)	So	Sebastian, FL
28	LHP	Jacob Marlowe	L/L	6 ft 0 in (1.83 m)	169 lb (77 kg)	RS Jr	Naples, FL
30	RHP	Cam Leiter	R/R	6 ft 5 in (1.96 m)	234 lb (106 kg)	Jr	Bayville, NJ
31	LHP	Matt Hoag	L/L	6 ft 4 in (1.93 m)	205 lb (93 kg)	Fr	Ponte Vedra Beach, FL
32	C	Josh Reiter	R/R	5 ft 11 in (1.8 m)	191 lb (87 kg)	Fr	St. Petersburg, FL
33	RHP	Ben Barrett Orlando, Fla.	R/R	6 ft 4 in (1.93 m)	221 lb (100 kg)	Jr	Orlando, FL
35	LHP	Brady Louck	L/L	5 ft 10 in (1.78 m)	181 lb (82 kg)	So	Plainfield, IL
36	INF	Jace Estes	L/R	5 ft 9 in (1.75 m)	154 lb (70 kg)	Fr	Crawfordville, FL
40	RHP	Joe Charles	R/R	6 ft 4 in (1.93 m)	219 lb (99 kg)	RS Sr	Celebration, FL
41	RHP	Chris Knier	R/R	5 ft 11 in (1.8 m)	182 lb (83 kg)	So	Jensen Beach, FL
42	RHP	David Barrett	R/R	6 ft 0 in (1.83 m)	196 lb (89 kg)	RS Sr	Sarasota, FL
45	RHP	Evan Chrest	R/R	6 ft 0 in (1.83 m)	182 lb (83 kg)	Jr	Tampa, FL
46	LHP	Hudson Rowan	R/L	6 ft 1 in (1.85 m)	209 lb (95 kg)	So	Panama City, FL
47	RHP	Rhett Vaughn	R/R	6 ft 3 in (1.91 m)	224 lb (102 kg)	Fr	Sebring, FL
51	INF	James Hankerson Jr.	S/L	6 ft 3 in (1.91 m)	229 lb (104 kg)	RS Fr	Tampa, FL
52	LHP	David Davila Miami, Fla.	L/L	5 ft 9 in (1.75 m)	174 lb (79 kg)	RS Fr	Miami, FL
54	LHP	Mason McDougall Tampa, Fla.	L/L	6 ft 1 in (1.85 m)	204 lb (93 kg)	RS Fr	Tampa, FL
55	LHP	Payton Manca	L/L	6 ft 6 in (1.98 m)	255 lb (116 kg)	RS Fr	Winchendon, MA

Head coach

Link Jarrett

Assistant coach(es)

Ty Megahee
Micah Posey
Brad Vanderglas

Legend

- (C) Team captain
- (S) Suspended
- (I) Ineligible
- Injured
- Current redshirt

Roster
Last update: February 17, 2025

=== Coaching and support staff ===
2025 Florida State Seminoles baseball coaching staff
Name	Position	Seasons at FSU	Alma mater
Link Jarrett	Head coach	3	Florida State University (1994)
Ty Megahee	Assistant coach	2	Mercer University (2006)
Micah Posey	Pitching coach	2	Florida State University (2011)
Brad Vanderglas	Assistant coach	13	Northern Kentucky University (2013)
Sebastian Jimenez	Graduate assistant	1	Florida State University (2024)
Jamie Burleson	Strength and Conditioning Coach	7	University of South Carolina (2012)
Phil Montano	Athletic Trainer	2	Ohio University (2014)
Drew Linder	Director of Baseball Operations	1	Florida State University (2018)
Randy Burdette	Director of Program Development	2	University of Tennessee (1993)
Nicki Bedgood	Administrative Associate	24	Florida State University (2001)
Jacob Frye	Equipment Coordinator	2	Marshall University (2019)

== Preseason ==
=== ACC coaches poll ===
ACC coaches poll
Predicted finish	Team	Votes (1st place)
1	Virginia	251 (13)
2	Florida State	230 (2)
3	North Carolina	217
4	Clemson	214 (1)
5	Duke	182
6	Wake Forest	171
7	NC State	168
8	Stanford	143
9	Louisville	128
10	Georgia Tech	113
11	Miami (FL)	87
12	Virginia Tech	85
13	California	60
14	Pitt	52
15	Notre Dame	44
16	Boston College	31

=== Preseason ACC awards and honors ===
Preseason All-ACC Team
Player	Position	Designation	Ref.
Jamie Arnold	Pitcher	Preseason ACC Pitcher of the Year; Preseason All-ACC First Team	
Hunter Carns	Catcher	Preseason ACC Freshman of the Year	

=== Preseason All-Americans ===
Preseason All-Americans
Player	Position	Selector	Ref.
Jamie Arnold	Pitcher	Baseball America; D1Baseball; NCBWA; Perfect Game; The Athletic	

== Game log ==
2025 Florida State Seminoles baseball game log (42–16)
Regular Season (37–13)

February (9–0)
Date	TV	Opponent	Rank	Stadium	Score	Win	Loss	Save	Attendance	Overall	ACC	Source
February 14	ACCNX	James Madison*	No. 9	Dick Howser Stadium; Tallahassee, FL	**W** 6–0	**Arnold** (1–0)	Logar (0–1)	**Abraham** (1)	6,700	1–0	—	Report
February 15	ACCNX	James Madison*	No. 9	Dick Howser Stadium	**W** 9–2	**Volini** (1–0)	Kinsler (0–1)	None	6,700	2–0	—	Report
February 16	ACCNX	James Madison*	No. 9	Dick Howser Stadium	**W** 10–0^{8}	**Mendes** (1–0)	Mozoki (0–1)	None	4,775	3–0	—	Report
February 18	ESPN+	at South Florida*	No. 9	Red McEwen Field; Tampa, FL	**W** 6–2	**Abraham** (1–0)	Yorek (0–1)	**Prescott** (1)	3,211	4–0	–	Report
February 21	ACCNX	Penn*	No. 9	Dick Howser Stadium	**W** 24–2^{7}	**Arnold** (2–0)	Katz (0–1)	None	5,116	5–0	—	Report
February 22	ACCNX	Penn*	No. 9	Dick Howser Stadium	**W** 9–3	**Volini** (2–0)	Coyne (0–1)	None	6,700	6–0	—	Report
February 23	ACCNX	Penn*	No. 9	Dick Howser Stadium	**W** 5–3	**Mendes** (2–0)	Tobin (0–1)	**Barrett** (1)	4,829	7–0	—	Report
February 26	ESPN+	at Jacksonville*	No. 7	John Sessions Stadium; Jacksonville, FL	**W** 9–6	**Chrest** (1–0)	Brooks (0–1)	**Knier** (1)	1,118	8–0	—	Report
February 28	ACCNX	Georgetown*	No. 7	Dick Howser Stadium	**W** 7–2	**Abraham** (2–0)	Raab (1–1)	**Martinez** (1)	5,346	9–0	—	Report

March (14–4)
Date	TV	Opponent	Rank	Stadium	Score	Win	Loss	Save	Attendance	Overall	ACC	Source
March 1	ACCNX	Georgetown*	No. 7	Dick Howser Stadium	**W** 11–2	**Volini** (3–0)	Sapienza (0–3)	None	5,706	10–0	—	Report
March 2	ACCNX	Georgetown*	No. 7	Dick Howser Stadium	**W** 4–3	**Prescott** (1–0)	Leckszas (0–1)	None	4,674	11–0	—	Report
March 4	ACCNX	North Florida*	No. 6	Dick Howser Stadium	**W** 10–1	**Chrest** (2–0)	Hendry (2–1)	None	5,066	12–0	—	Report
March 5	ACCNX	Bethune–Cookman*	No. 6	Dick Howser Stadium	**W** 9–7	**Manca** (1–0)	Lopez (0–1)	**Knier** (2)	4,148	13–0	—	Report
March 7	ACCNX	Lipscomb*	No. 6	Dick Howser Stadium	**W** 10–1	**Volini** (4–0)	Poindexter (1–2)	None	4,435	14–0	—	Report
March 8	ACCNX	Lipscomb*	No. 6	Dick Howser Stadium	**W** 11–5	**Mendes** (3–0)	Ramos (1–2)	None	4,157	15–0	—	Report
March 9	ACCNX	Lipscomb*	No. 6	Dick Howser Stadium	**Canceled**							
Sunshine Showdown Series
March 11	ACCNX	No. 7 Florida*	No. 5	Dick Howser Stadium	**L** 2–7	Barberi (1–0)	**Chrest** (2–1)	None	6,700	15–1	—	Report
March 14	ACCNX	Boston College	No. 5	Dick Howser Stadium	**W** 8–2	**Volini** (5–0)	Chicoine (0–2)	None	4,452	16–1	1–0	Report
March 15 (DH)	ACCNX	Boston College	No. 5	Dick Howser Stadium	**W** 14–0^{7}	**Arnold** (3–0)	Mudd (0–1)	None	5,044	17–1	2–0	Report
March 15 (DH)	ACCNX	Boston College	No. 5	Dick Howser Stadium	**W** 6–2	**Mendes** (4–0)	Kipp (0–1)	**Martinez** (1)	5,044	18–1	3–0	Report
March 18	ACCNX	Mercer*	No. 5	Dick Howser Stadium	**L** 3–9	Johnson (3–0)	**Manca** (1–1)	None	5,546	18–2	—	Report
March 20	ACCN	at Miami (FL)	No. 5	Alex Rodriguez Park; Coral Gables, FL	**W** 14–1^{7}	**Volini** (6–0)	Robert (2–4)	None	3,070	19–2	4–0	Report
March 21	ACCN	at Miami (FL)	No. 5	Alex Rodriguez Park	**L** 6–9	Hugus (2–1)	**Arnold** (3–1)	Giroux (1)	3,483	19–3	4–1	Report
March 22	ACCNX	at Miami (FL)	No. 5	Alex Rodriguez Park	**W** 10–6	**Prescott** (2–0)	Walters (2–1)	None	3,555	20–3	5–1	Report
Sunshine Showdown Series
March 25	ACCNX	vs. Florida*	No. 4	VyStar Ballpark; Jacksonville, FL	**W** 8–4	**Rowan** (1–0)	Philpot (0–2)	None	7,341	21–3	—	Report
March 28	ACCNX	at Notre Dame	No. 4	Frank Eck Stadium; South Bend, IN	**L** 9–16	Van Ameyde (2–1)	**Martinez** (0–1)	None	754	21–4	5–2	Report
March 30 (DH)	ACCNX	at Notre Dame	No. 4	Frank Eck Stadium	**W** 4–2^{7} (Note: shortened game due to inclement weather)	**Volini** (7–0)	Fox (0–2)	None	425	22–4	6–2	Report
March 30 (DH)	ACCNX	at Notre Dame	No. 4	Frank Eck Stadium	**W** 17–9	**Knier** (1–0)	Heine (2–2)	None	425	23–4	7–2	Report

April (8–5)
Date	TV	Opponent	Rank	Stadium	Score	Win	Loss	Save	Attendance	Overall	ACC	Source
April 1	ACCNX	Jacksonville*	No. 4	Dick Howser Stadium	**W** 11–10	**Charles** (1–0)	Powers (0–1)	**Barrett** (1)	5,532	24–4	—	Report
April 4	ACCN	Wake Forest	No. 4	Dick Howser Stadium	**W** 5–4	**Prescott** (3–0)	Gunther (1–3)	None	6,700	25–4	8–2	Report
April 5	ACCNX	Wake Forest	No. 4	Dick Howser Stadium	**L** 0–12^{7}	Lunceford (5–2)	**Volini** (7–1)	None	6,700	25–5	8–3	Report
April 6	ACCNX	Wake Forest	No. 4	Dick Howser Stadium	**L** 2–17^{8}	Morningstar (4–0)	**Mendes** (4–1)	None	5,501	25–6	8–4	Report
Sunshine Showdown Series
April 8	ESPN2	at Florida*	No. 9	Condron Family Ballpark; Gainesville, FL	**L** 4–5	Biemiller (1–0)	**Martinez** (0–2)	Clemente (1)	6,059	25–7	—	Report
April 12 (DH)	ACCNX	at No. 25 Virginia Tech	No. 9	English Field; Blacksburg, VA	**W** 3–1	**Volini** (8–1)	Renfrow (3–3)	**Charles** (1)	1,389	26–7	9–4	Report
April 12 (DH)	ACCNX	at No. 25 Virginia Tech	No. 9	English Field	**W** 12–1	**Arnold** (4–1)	Marciano (4–1)	None	1,310	27–7	10–4	Report
April 13	ACCNX	at No. 25 Virginia Tech	No. 9	English Field	**W** 4–2	**Mendes** (5–1)	Manning (2–3)	**Prescott** (1)	1,420	28–7	11–4	Report
April 15	ACCNX	South Florida*	No. 7	Dick Howser Stadium	**W** 19–0^{7}	**Manca** (2–1)	Hill (0–3)	None	5,560	29–7	—	Report
April 17	ESPNU	Virginia	No. 7	Dick Howser Stadium	**Canceled** (Note: series canceled in the aftermath of the 2025 Florida State University shooting)							
April 18	ESPN2	Virginia	No. 7	Dick Howser Stadium	**Canceled**							
April 19	ACCN	Virginia	No. 7	Dick Howser Stadium	**Canceled**							
April 22	ACCNX	Stetson*	No. 4	Dick Howser Stadium	**W** 11–6	**Abraham** (3–0)	Coppersmith (4–3)	None	6,700	30–7	—	Report
April 25	ACCNX	at No. 19 Louisville	No. 4	Jim Patterson Stadium; Louisville, KY	**W** 10–2	**Arnold** (5–1)	Eberle (3–2)	None	2,466	31–7	12–4	Report
April 26	ACCNX	at No. 19 Louisville	No. 4	Jim Patterson Stadium	**L** 4–9	Schweitzer (3–0)	**Knier** (1–1)	None	2,724	31–8	12–5	Report
April 27	ACCN	at No. 19 Louisville	No. 4	Jim Patterson Stadium	**L** 2–14	Schlageter (3–1)	**Mendes** (5–2)	None	3,197	31–9	12–6	Report

May (6–4)
Date	TV	Opponent	Rank	Stadium	Score	Win	Loss	Save	Attendance	Overall	ACC	Source
May 2	ACCNX	No. 3 Clemson	No. 5	Dick Howser Stadium	**W** 6–5^{11}	**Prescott** (4–0)	Bailey (2–3)	None	6,700	32–9	13–6	Report
May 3 (Note: game postponed in the eighth inning due to weather and resumed play the following day)	ESPN2	No. 3 Clemson	No. 5	Dick Howser Stadium	**L** 3–6	Fitzgerald (4–0)	**Volini** (8–2)	Garris (3)	6,700	32–10	13–7	Report
May 4	ACCNX	No. 3 Clemson	No. 5	Dick Howser Stadium	**W** 20–9^{8}	**Charles** (2–0)	Bell (0–1)	None	5,542	33–10	14–7	Report
May 6	ACCNX	Jacksonville*	No. 2	Dick Howser Stadium	**W** 14–2^{7}	**Marlowe** (1–0)	Corbett (0–2)	None	4,523	34–10	—	Report
May 9	ACCNX	at California	No. 2	Evans Diamond; Berkeley, CA	**W** 8–2	**Arnold** (6–1)	Foley (3–3)	None	1,106	35–10	15–7	Report
May 10	ACCNX	at California	No. 2	Evans Diamond	**L** 0–5	Gavin (4–4)	**Volini** (8–3)	None	992	35–11	15–8	Report
May 11	ACCNX	at California	No. 2	Evans Diamond	**W** 5–1	**Mendes** (6–2)	Tremain (4–6)	**Charles** (2)	706	36–11	16–8	Report
May 15	ACCN	No. 4 North Carolina	No. 2	Dick Howser Stadium	**L** 3–8	Knapp (11–0)	**Arnold** (6–2)	None	5,413	36–12	16–9	Report
May 16	ACCN	No. 4 North Carolina	No. 2	Dick Howser Stadium	**L** 1–11^{7}	Decaro (8–3)	**Volini** (8–4)	None	5,999	36–13	16–10	Report
May 17	ACCNX	No. 4 North Carolina	No. 2	Dick Howser Stadium	**W** 5–4	**Abraham** (4–0)	Seagraves (2–1)	None	5,254	37–13	17–10	Report

Postseason (5–3)

ACC tournament (1–1)
Date	TV	Opponent	Rank	Stadium	Score	Win	Loss	Save	Attendance	Overall	ACCT Record	Source
May 23	ACCN	vs. (7) Duke; **Quarterfinals**	(2) No. 6	Durham Bulls Athletic Park; Durham, NC	**W** 14–7	**Arnold** (7–2)	Proksch (2–3)	None	4,122	38–13	1–0	Report
May 24	ACCN	vs. (3) No. 3 North Carolina; **Semifinals**	(2) No. 6	Durham Bulls Athletic Park	**L** 5–7	Haugh (5–4)	**Volini** (8–5)	McDuffie (1)	8,165	38–14	1–1	Report

NCAA tournament (4–2)
Date	TV	Opponent	Rank	Stadium	Score	Win	Loss	Save	Attendance	Overall	NCAAT Record	Source
May 30	ACCN	Bethune–Cookman; Tallahassee Regional	(9) No. 7	Dick Howser Stadium	**W** 6–2	**Prescott** (4–0)	Core (6–2)	None	4,837	39–14	1–0	Report
May 31	ESPN2	Mississippi State; Tallahassee Regional	(9) No. 7	Dick Howser Stadium	**W** 10–3	**Arnold** (8–2)	Kohn (5–4)	None	5,463	40–14	2–0	Report
June 1	ACCN	Mississippi State; Tallahassee Regional Final	(9) No. 7	Dick Howser Stadium	**W** 5–2	**Mendes** (7–2)	Dotson (1–2)	**Charles** (4)	5,222	41–14	3–0	Report
June 6	ESPN2	at (8) No. 8 Oregon State; Corvallis Super Regional - Game 1	(9) No. 7	Goss Stadium at Coleman Field; Corvallis, OR	**L** 4–5^{10}	Oakes (4–0)	**Abraham** (4–1)	None	4,378	41–15	3–1	Report
June 7	ESPN2	at (8) No. 8 Oregon State; Corvallis Super Regional - Game 2	(9) No. 7	Goss Stadium at Coleman Field	**W** 3–1	**Martinez** (1–2)	Kleinschmit (8–4)	**Prescott** (1)	4,408	42–15	4–1	Report
June 8	ESPN2	at (8) No. 8 Oregon State; Corvallis Super Regional - Game 3	(9) No. 7	Goss Stadium at Coleman Field	**L** 10–14	Kmatz (2–0)	**Mendes** (7–3)	None	4,380	42–16	4–2	Report

Legend: = Win = Loss = Canceled
Bold = Florida State team member * Non-conference game
Rankings are based on the team's current ranking in the D1Baseball poll.

== Rankings ==
Ranking movements Legend: ██ Increase in ranking ██ Decrease in ranking ( ) = First-place votes
	Week																
Poll	Pre	1	2	3	4	5	6	7	8	9	10	11	12	13	14	15	Final
Coaches'	6	6*	5 (1)	5	4 (1)	4	4	4	8	8	7	8	3 (5)	2 (5)	6	8	9
Baseball America	6	5	5	4	4	4	6	6	13	10	10	19	7	5	9	9*	11
NCBWA†	6	5	6	5	4	4	6	4	8	7	7	7	5	3	4	8	9
D1Baseball	9	9	7	6	5	5	4	4	9	7	4	5	2	2	6	7	10
Perfect Game	6	6	5	5	5	5	6	6	10	8	8	13	9	6	11	11*	10

† NCBWA ranks 30 teams in their preseason poll, but only ranks 25 teams weekly during the season.
* A new poll was not released for this week, so for comparison purposes, the previous week's ranking is inserted in this week's slot.

== Awards and honors ==
=== Watchlists ===
Player	Watchlist	Ref.
Jamie Arnold; Joey Volini; Wes Mendes	Golden Spikes Award	

=== Weekly Honors ===
Player	Award	Ref.
Alex Lodise	ACC Player of the Week	
Joey Volini	ACC Pitcher of the Week	
Jamie Arnold	ACC Pitcher of the Week	
Drew Faurot	ACC Player of the Week	

=== Monthly Honors ===
Player	Award	Ref.
Joey Volini	National Pitcher of the Month	

=== Yearly Honors ===
Player	Award	Ref.
Alex Lodise	Dick Howser Trophy winner National Midseason Player of the Year; ACC Player of the Year; ACC Defensive Player of the Year; Consensus All-American; First Team All-American; Second Team All-American; NCBWA Player of the Year (District 3); ABCA Southeast All-Region First Team; First Team All-ACC; Golden Spikes Award finalist Brooks Wallace Award finalist	
Jamie Arnold	Consensus All-American; First Team All-American; Second Team All-American; First Team All-ACC; All Regional Team; Regional MVP; ABCA Southeast All-Region First Team; Dick Howser Trophy semifinalist Golden Spikes Award semifinalist	
Drew Faurot	First Team All-ACC; All Regional Team	
Max Williams	Second Team All-ACC; ABCA Southeast All-Region Second Team	
Joey Volini	Second Team All-ACC; Dick Howser Trophy semifinalist	
Gage Harrelson	Third Team All-ACC	
Myles Bailey	Freshman All-American; All-ACC Freshman Team; ACC All-Tournament Team; All Regional Team	
Cal Fisher	All Regional Team	
Wes Mendes	All Regional Team	

== MLB draft ==
Eleven players, a school record, were drafted into the MLB.

Player	Position	Round	Overall	Team	Ref.
Jamie Arnold	P	1	11	Oakland Athletics	
Alex Lodise	SS	2	60	Atlanta Braves	
Cam Leiter	P	2	65	Los Angeles Dodgers	
Max Williams	OF	3	78	Miami Marlins	
Drew Faurot	IF	4	108	Miami Marlins	
Peyton Prescott	P	5	163	New York Mets	
Joey Volini	P	6	168	Miami Marlins	
Evan Chrest	P	15	462	Cleveland Guardians	
Gage Harrelson	OF	16	469	Los Angeles Angels	
Jaxson West	C	16	472	Toronto Blue Jays	
Maison Martinez	P	16	474	Cincinnati Reds	
