= 2025 Miami Hurricanes baseball team =

American college baseball season

2025 Miami Hurricanes baseball

Hattiesburg Regional champions

Louisville Super Regional, 1–2
- Conference: Atlantic Coast Conference
- Record: 35–27 (15–14 ACC)
- Head coach: J.D. Arteaga (2nd season)
- Assistant coaches: Laz Gutierrez (2nd season); Chris Dominguez (1st season); Jonathan Anderson (2nd season)
- Home stadium: Alex Rodriguez Park at Mark Light Field

2025 Atlantic Coast Conference baseball standings
	Conf.				Overall
Team	W		L	PCT	W		L	PCT
No. 18 Georgia Tech ‍†‍‍^{y}	19	–	11	.633	41	–	19	.683
No. 7 Florida State ‍‍‍^{y}	17	–	10	.630	41	–	14	.745
No. 1 North Carolina ‍‍‡‍^{y}	18	–	11	.621	46	–	13	.780
NC State ‍‍‍^{y}	17	–	11	.607	35	–	21	.625
No. 14 Clemson ‍‍‍^{y}	18	–	12	.600	45	–	18	.714
Virginia ‍‍‍	16	–	11	.593	32	–	18	.640
Duke ‍‍‍^{y}	17	–	13	.567	40	–	19	.678
Wake Forest ‍‍‍^{y}	16	–	14	.533	39	–	22	.639
Miami (FL) ‍‍‍^{y}	15	–	14	.517	34	–	26	.567
Louisville ‍‍‍^{y}	15	–	15	.500	39	–	21	.650
Notre Dame ‍‍‍	14	–	16	.467	32	–	21	.604
Virginia Tech ‍‍‍	12	–	18	.400	31	–	25	.554
Stanford ‍‍‍	11	–	19	.367	27	–	25	.519
Boston College ‍‍‍	11	–	19	.367	28	–	29	.491
Pittsburgh ‍‍‍	10	–	20	.333	28	–	27	.509
California ‍‍‍	9	–	21	.300	24	–	31	.436
† – Conference champion ‡ – Tournament champion y – Invited to the NCAA Tournament; As of June 6, 2025; Rankings from D1Baseball

The 2025 Miami Hurricanes baseball team represents the University of Miami during the 2025 NCAA Division I baseball season. The Hurricanes play their home games at Alex Rodriguez Park at Mark Light Field as a member of the Atlantic Coast Conference (ACC). The Hurricanes are led by head coach J.D. Arteaga, in his 2nd season the head coach and 23rd season at Miami.

== Roster ==
2025 Miami Hurricanes roster
Pitchers: 8 - Carson Fischer - Graduate Student; 13 - Griffin Hugus - Junior; 22 - Reese Lumpkin - Graduate Student; 27 - Tae DeRias - Freshman; 31 - Will Smith - Graduate Student; 35 - Alex Stanyek - (redshirt) Freshman; 36 - Nick Robert - Sophomore; 41 - Alex Giroux - Graduate Student; 45 - Brixton Lofgren - Sophomore; 49 - Jackson Cleveland - Senior; 52 - AJ Ciscar - Freshman; 99 - Lazaro Collera - Freshman; 10 - Drian Walters - (redshirt) Junior; 9 - Rob Evans - Junior; 39 - Michael Fernandez - Freshman; 44 - Jake Dorn - Freshman	Catchers: 21 - Nolan Johnson - Freshman; 30 - Tanner Smith - Senior; 40 - Evan Taveras - Freshman; Infielders: 0 - Dorian Gonzalez Jr. - Senior; 4 - Jake Ogden - Junior; 6 - Brandon DeGoti - Freshman; 14 - Daniel Cuvet - Sophomore; 38 - Amaury De Jesus - Freshman; 53 - Adrian Areizaga - Freshman	Outfielders: 2 - Derek Williams - Senior; 7 - Max Galvin - (redshirt) Junior; 16 - Bobby Marsh - Graduate Student; 24 - Jake Kulikwski - Sophomore; 34 - Michael Torres - Freshman; 37 - Fabio Peralta - Freshman; 55 - Gaby Gutierrez - Senior	Two Way Players: 18 - Todd Hudson - Junior; 51 - Renzo Gonzalez - (redshirt) Junior; 46 - Ethan Puig - Freshman

=== Coaches ===
2025 Miami Hurricanes baseball coaching staff
- J.D. Arteaga – Head coach – 2nd season
- Laz Gutierrez – Assistant coach – 2nd season
- Chris Dominguez – Assistant coach – 1st season
- Jonathan Anderson – Assistant coach – 2nd season

Note: Season counter accounts for all stints at Miami (FL).

== Personnel ==
=== Starters ===
Opening Night Lineup
Pos.	No.	Player.	Year
LF			
CF			
SS			
DH			
1B			
RF			
3B			
C			
2B			

Weekend pitching rotation
Day	No.	Player.	Year
Friday			
Saturday			
Sunday			

== Schedule and results ==
2025 Miami Hurricans baseball game log
(Overall: 35-27; Conference: 15-14); (Home: 22-9; Away: 7-14; Neutral: 6-4)
Regular season (31-23)
February (0-0)
(Home; 0-0; Away: 0-0)

Date Time	Opponent	Rank	TV	Venue	Score	Win	Loss	Save	Attendance	Overall record	ACC record

March (0-0)
(Home; 0-0; Away: 0-0)

Date Time	Opponent	Rank	TV	Venue	Score	Win	Loss	Save	Attendance	Overall record	ACC record

April (0-0)
(Home; 0-0; Away: 0-0)

Date Time	Opponent	Rank	TV	Venue	Score	Win	Loss	Save	Attendance	Overall record	ACC record

May (0-0)
(Home; 0-0; Away: 0-0)

Date Time	Opponent	Rank	TV	Venue	Score	Win	Loss	Save	Attendance	Overall record	ACC record

Postseason (4–4)
ACC Tournament (0–1)

Date Time	Opponent	Rank	TV	Venue	Score	Win	Loss	Save	Attendance	Overall record	Tournament record
May 20th 10:00 a.m.	vs (16) California (First Round)	(9)	ACCN	Durham Bulls Athletic Park • Durham, North Carolina	**L** 2-12^{(8)}	de la Torre (3-4)	**Hugus** (5-7)	—	1,721	31-24	0-1

Hattiesburg Regional (3–1)

Date Time	Opponent	Rank	TV	Venue	Score	Win	Loss	Save	Attendance	Overall record	Regional record
May 30th 3:00 p.m.	vs (2) Alabama	(3)	ESPN2	Pete Taylor Park • Hattiesburg, Mississippi	**W** 5–3	**Ciscar** (6–1)	Quick (8–3)	**Walters** (9)	5,329	32–24	1–0
May 31st 9:00 p.m.	vs (4) Columbia	(3)	ESPN+	Pete Taylor Park	**W** 14–1	**Hugus** (6–7)	Santana (5–4)	—	5,329	33–24	2–0
June 1st 7:00 p.m.	vs (1) Southern Miss	(3)	ESPN+	Pete Taylor Park	**L** 6–17	Sunstrom (3–0)	**DeRias** (2–3)	—	5,329	33–25	2–1
June 2nd 9:00 p.m.	vs (1) Southern Miss	(3)	ESPNU	Pete Taylor Park	**W** 5–4	**Smith** (3–0)	Adams (6–4)	**Walters** (10)	5,329	34–25	3–1

Louisville Super Regional (1–2)

Date Time	Opponent	TV	Venue	Score	Win	Loss	Save	Attendance	Overall record	Super Regional record
June 6th 3:00 p.m.	vs Louisville	ESPN2	Jim Patterson Stadium • Louisville, Kentucky	**L** 1–8	Forbes (4–2)	**Ciscar** (6–2)	—	5,776	34–26	0–1
June 7th 11:00 a.m.	vs Louisville	ESPN	Jim Patterson Stadium	**W** 9–6	**Fischer** (5–1)	Brown (5–5)	**Walters** (11)	6,066	35–26	1–1
June 8th 12:00 p.m.	vs Louisville	ESPN2	Jim Patterson Stadium	**L** 2–3	Schweitzer (4–2)	**Smith** (3–1)	Cutts (2)	6,046	35–27	1–2

"#" represents ranking. All rankings from D1 Baseball Poll on the date of the contest.
"()" represents postseason seeding in the Big 10 Tournament or NCAA Regional, respectively.
Gametime is in EST
= Win, = Loss, = Canceled/Postponed
Bold = **Miami Hurricanes team member**
* = Non-Conference Game
Schedule Source:

== Rankings ==
Ranking movements
	Week																		
Poll	Pre	1	2	3	4	5	6	7	8	9	10	11	12	13	14	15	16	17	Final
Coaches'		*																	
Baseball America																			
NCBWA†																			

† NCBWA ranks 30 teams in their preseason poll, but only ranks 25 teams weekly during the season.
* A new poll was not released for this week, so for comparison purposes, the previous week's ranking is inserted in this week's slot.
