= Belvidere =

Belvidere (from the Latin bellus + videre, meaning "beautiful sight") may refer to:

== Places ==
=== Australia ===
- Belvidere, South Australia, a small town southeast of Strathalbyn
- Belvidere Range, South Australia, a mountain range
- Hundred of Belvidere, a district north of the Barossa Valley in South Australia
- District Council of Belvidere, a former local government area governing the hundred

=== United States ===
- Belvidere, Idaho, a place in Valley County, Idaho
- Belvidere Township, Boone County, Illinois
  - Belvidere, Illinois, a city within the township
- Belvidere, Kansas
- Belvidere Township, Michigan
- Belvidere, an abandoned settlement in Harrison Township in Macomb County
- Belvidere Township, Minnesota
  - Belvidere, Minnesota, a former post office in Belvidere Township
- Belvidere (Natchez, Mississippi), on the NRHP
- Belvidere, Nebraska
- Belvidere, New Jersey
  - Belvidere Historic District (Belvidere, New Jersey), on the NRHP
- Belvidere, New York, a place in Allegany County, New York
- Belvidere (Belmont, New York), on the NRHP
- Belvidere, North Carolina, an unincorporated community
  - Belvidere (Belvidere, North Carolina), on the NRHP
- Belvidere (Williamsboro, North Carolina), on the NRHP
- Belvidere Plantation House, Hampstead, North Carolina, on the NRHP
- Belvidere Historic District (Hertford, North Carolina), on the NRHP
- The Belvidere, a mansion in Claremore, Oklahoma, on the NRHP in Rogers County, Oklahoma
- Belvidere, South Dakota
- Belvidere, Tennessee
- Belvidere, Vermont
- Belvidere (Goochland County, Virginia), a historic farm property
- Belvidere, Wisconsin

=== Elsewhere ===
- Belvidere, County Westmeath, Ireland, a townland in the civil parish of Moylisker
- Belvidere, Western Cape, South Africa
- City of Glasgow Fever and Smallpox Hospitals, Belvidere, historic hospital in Scotland

== Schools ==
- Belvidere School, Shrewsbury, Shropshire, England
- Belvidere High School (Illinois), United States
- Belvidere High School (New Jersey), United States

== See also ==
- Belvedere (disambiguation)
- Belvidere Hill Historic District, Lowell, Massachusetts, on the NRHP
