= 2025 Charleston Cougars baseball team =

Baseball team season

2025 Charleston Cougars baseball
- Conference: Coastal Athletic Association
- Record: 22–16 (7–8 CAA)
- Head coach: Chad Holbrook (8th season)
- Associate head coach: Will Dorton (5th season)
- Assistant coach: Sam Gjormand (4th season)
- Hitting coach: Adam Brown (3rd season)
- Pitching coach: Sawyer Bridges (3rd season)
- Home stadium: CofC Baseball Stadium at Patriots Point

2025 Coastal Athletic Association baseball standings
	Conf.				Overall
Team	W		L	PCT	W		L	PCT
No. 19 Northeastern ‍†‍‡‍^{y}	25	–	2	.926	49	–	11	.817
UNCW ‍‍‍	19	–	8	.704	34	–	24	.586
Charleston ‍‍‍	15	–	12	.556	37	–	22	.627
Campbell ‍‍‍	15	–	12	.556	25	–	31	.446
William & Mary ‍‍‍	14	–	13	.519	21	–	35	.375
Elon ‍‍‍	13	–	14	.481	25	–	32	.439
Delaware ‍‍‍	12	–	15	.444	28	–	25	.528
Stony Brook ‍‍‍	11	–	16	.407	25	–	27	.481
Towson ‍‍‍	11	–	16	.407	21	–	35	.375
Monmouth ‍‍‍	10	–	17	.370	24	–	30	.444
North Carolina A&T ‍‍‍	9	–	18	.333	15	–	37	.288
Hofstra ‍‍‍	8	–	19	.296	18	–	36	.333
† – Conference champion ‡ – Tournament champion y – Invited to the NCAA Tournament; As of June 1, 2025; Rankings from D1Baseball

The 2025 Charleston Cougars baseball team represents the College of Charleston during the 2025 NCAA Division I baseball season. The Cougars play their home games at the CofC Baseball Stadium at Patriots Point as a member of the Coastal Athletic Association. They are led by head coach Chad Holbrook, in his eighth year as head coach.

== Preseason ==
=== Coaches poll ===
The coaches poll was released on February 5, 2025. Charleston was selected to finish second in the conference.

Coaches' Poll
Predicted finish	Team	Points
1	UNCW	117 (8)
2	Charleston	109 (3)
3	Northeastern	107 (1)
4	Campbell	78
5	Delaware	77
6	Elon	70
7	Stony Brook	56
8	William & Mary	55
9	Hofstra	51
10	North Carolina A&T	37
11	Monmouth	19
12	Towson	16

=== Awards and honors ===
==== Preseason CAA awards and honors ====
Preseason All-CAA Team
Player	No.	Position	Class	Designation
Avery Neaves	30	OF	Graduate	First Team
Jake Brink	21	SP	Junior	First Team
Davis Aiken	18	RP	Senior	First Team
Dylan Johnson	9	C	Senior	Honorable Mention
Aidan Hunter	14	SP	Senior	Honorable Mention
Alex Lyon	12	RP	RS Junior	Honorable Mention

== Personnel ==
=== Starters ===
Lineup
Pos.	No.	Player.	Year
C	9	Dylan Johnson	Senior
1B	8	Payton Frehner	Junior
2B	6	Brent Gibbs	Sophomore
3B	15	Ethan Plyler	RS Junior
SS	2	Rafael Soto	Freshman
LF	30	Avery Neaves	Graduate
CF	1	Dariyan Pendergrass	Senior
RF	42	Will Baumhofer	Graduate
DH	20	Matthew Dominianni	Freshman

Weekend pitching rotation
Day	No.	Player.	Year
Friday	21	Jake Brink	Junior
Saturday	14	Aidan Hunter	Senior
Sunday	10	Hayden Thomas	Sophomore

== Rankings ==
Ranking movements Legend: — = Not ranked RV = Received votes
	Week																		
Poll	Pre	1	2	3	4	5	6	7	8	9	10	11	12	13	14	15	16	17	Final
Coaches'	RV	RV*	RV																
Baseball America	—	—	—																
NCBWA†	RV	RV	RV																
D1Baseball	—	—	—																
Perfect Game	—	—	—																

† NCBWA ranks 30 teams in their preseason poll, but only ranks 25 teams weekly during the season.
* A new poll was not released for this week, so for comparison purposes, the previous week's ranking is inserted in this week's slot.

== Game log ==
2025 Charleston Cougars baseball Game Log (18–12)
Regular season (18–12)

February (6–3)
Date	Opponent	Rank	Site/Stadium	Score	Win	Loss	Save	TV	Attendance	Overall Record	CAA Record
February 14	VCU*		CofC Baseball Stadium; Mount Pleasant, SC	**W** 10–0^{7}	**Brink** (1–0)	Dressler (0–1)	None	FloSports	713	1–0	–
February 15	VCU*		CofC Baseball Stadium	**W** 12–2	**Hunter** (1–0)	Yetter (0–1)	None	FloSports	764	2–0	—
February 16	VCU*		CofC Baseball Stadium	**L** 9–10	Tappy (1–0)	**Samonsky** (0–1)	None	FloSports	803	2–1	—
February 19	at Coastal Carolina*		Springs Brooks Stadium; Conway, SC	**W** 15–5^{8}	**Lyon** (1–0)	Ellison (0–1)	None	ESPN+	2,076	3–1	—
February 21	Seton Hall*		CofC Baseball Stadium	**W** 4–1	**Brink** (2–0)	Torres (0–1)	**Aiken** (1)	WSFX	564	4–1	—
February 22	Seton Hall*		CofC Baseball Stadium	**W** 8–1	**Hunter** (2–0)	Reich (0–1)	None	FloSports	714	5–1	—
February 23	Seton Hall*		CofC Baseball Stadium	**L** 5–8	Downing (1–0)	**Lyon** (1–1)	None	FloSports	713	5–2	—
February 25	at Georgia Southern*		Clements Stadium; Statesboro, GA	**W** 6–3	**Brooks** (1–0)	Bryant (1–1)	None	ESPN+	1,984	6–2	—
February 28	Creighton*		CofC Baseball Stadium	**L** 6–8	Aukerman (2–0)	**Brink** (2–1)	Langrell (2)	FloSports	633	6–3	—

March (9–8)
Date	Opponent	Rank	Site/Stadium	Score	Win	Loss	Save	TV	Attendance	Overall Record	CAA Record
March 1	Creighton*		CofC Baseball Stadium	**W** 18–6	**Hunter** (3–0)	Koosman (0–2)	None	FloSports	794	7–3	—
March 2	Creighton*		CofC Baseball Stadium	**L** 4–8	Magers (2–1)	**Brooks** (1–1)	**Langrell** (3)	FloSports	656	7–4	—
March 5	at No. 4 North Carolina*		Boshamer Stadium; Chapel Hill, NC	**Postponed**							
March 7	Appalachian State*		CofC Baseball Stadium	**W** 5–4	**Lyon** (2–1)	Wilson (1–1)	**Aiken** (2)	FloSports	633	8–4	—
March 8	Appalachian State*		CofC Baseball Stadium	**L** 0–13	Marks (1–0)	**Hunter** (3–1)	None	FloSports	855	8–5	—
March 9	Appalachian State*		CofC Baseball Stadium	**W** 11–4	**Brooks** (2–1)	Little (0–3)	None	FloSports	634	9–5	—
March 11	Wofford*		CofC Baseball Stadium	**W** 9–8	**Eggert** (1–0)	Sills (1–2)	**Aiken** (3)	FloSports	651	10–5	—
March 14	Dartmouth*		CofC Baseball Stadium	**W** 2–1	**Lyon** (3–1)	Chambers (0–1)	None	FloSports	857	11–5	—
March 15	Dartmouth*		CofC Baseball Stadium	**W** 7–3	**Hunter** (4–1)	Albert (0–2)	None	FloSports	717	12–5	—
March 16	Dartmouth*		CofC Baseball Stadium	**Canceled**							
March 18	vs. South Carolina*		Segra Park; Columbia, SC	**L** 3–4	Garino (2–0)	**Eggert** (1–1)	Marlatt (1)	SECN+	2,610	12–6	—
March 19	Winthrop*		CofC Baseball Stadium	**L** 3–9	Harris (3–1)	**Medley** (0–1)	None	FloSports	624	12–7	—
March 21	Elon		CofC Baseball Stadium	**W** 12–2^{8}	**Brink** (3–1)	Mitrovich (2–1)	None	FloSports	607	13–7	1–0
March 22	Elon		CofC Baseball Stadium	**L** 13–14	Sprock (1–0)	**Aiken** (0–1)	None	FloSports	750	13–8	1–1
March 23	Elon		CofC Baseball Stadium	**W** 11–6	**Lyon** (4–1)	Lavelle (2–3)	None	FloSports	705	14–8	2–1
March 25	at The Citadel*		Joseph P. Riley Jr. Park; Charleston, SC	**L** 2–4	Davis (2–2)	**Thomas** (1–0)	Hausner (4)	ESPN+	1,029	14–9	—
March 28	Campbell		CofC Baseball Stadium	**L** 7–12	Brown (1–1)	**Brink** (3–2)	Music (1)	FloSports	707	14–10	2–2
March 29	Campbell		CofC Baseball Stadium	**W** 6–5	**Samonsky** (1–1)	Hendricks (1–2)	**Aiken** (4)	FloSports	703	15–10	3–2
March 30	Campbell		CofC Baseball Stadium	**L** 7–8	Rossow (3–3)	**Murray** (0–1)	Schares (3)	FloSports	693	15–11	3–3

April (3–1)
Date	Opponent	Rank	Site/Stadium	Score	Win	Loss	Save	TV	Attendance	Overall Record	CAA Record
April 1	Charleston Southern*		CofC Baseball Stadium	**W** 14–9	**Lyon** (5–1)	Krause (1–1)	None	FloSports	635	16–11	—
April 4	at Monmouth		Monmouth Baseball Field; West Long Branch, NJ	**W** 5–1	**Brink** (4–2)	Kent (1–5)		FloSports	207	17–11	4–3
April 5	at Monmouth		Monmouth Baseball Field	**W** 6–5	**Brooks** (3–1)	Beard (1–3)	**Aiken** (5)	FloSports	163	18–11	5–3
April 6	at Monmouth		Monmouth Baseball Field	**L** 4–5	Mealy (3–0)	**Hunter** (4–2)	Greeley (1)	FloSports	173	18–12	5–4
April 8	at Charleston Southern*		CSU Ballpark; North Charleston, SC					ESPN+			—
April 11	Delaware		CofC Baseball Stadium					FloSports			
April 12	Delaware		CofC Baseball Stadium					FloSports			
April 13	Delaware		CofC Baseball Stadium					FloSports			
April 16	The Citadel*		CofC Baseball Stadium					FloSports			—
April 18	at Northeastern		Friedman Diamond; Boston, MA					FloSports			
April 19	at Northeastern		Friedman Diamond					FloSports			
April 20	at Northeastern		Friedman Diamond					FloSports			
April 22	No. 21 Coastal Carolina*		CofC Baseball Stadium					FloSports			—
April 25	UNCW		CofC Baseball Stadium					FloSports			—
April 26	UNCW		CofC Baseball Stadium					FloSports			—
April 27	UNCW		CofC Baseball Stadium					FloSports			—
April 30	Georgia Southern*		CofC Baseball Stadium					FloSports			—

May
Date	Opponent	Rank	Site/Stadium	Score	Win	Loss	Save	TV	Attendance	Overall Record	CAA Record
May 2	at William & Mary		Plumeri Park; Williamsburg, VA					FloSports			
May 3	at William & Mary		Plumeri Park					FloSports			
May 4	at William & Mary		Plumeri Park					FloSports			
May 6	The Citadel*		CofC Baseball Stadium					FloSports			—
May 9	at North Carolina A&T		War Memorial Stadium; Greensboro, NC					FloSports			
May 10	at North Carolina A&T		War Memorial Stadium					FloSports			
May 11	at North Carolina A&T		War Memorial Stadium					FloSports			
May 13	USC Upstate*		CofC Baseball Stadium					FloSports			—
May 15	Hofstra		CofC Baseball Stadium					FloSports			
May 16	Hofstra		CofC Baseball Stadium					FloSports			
May 17	Hofstra		CofC Baseball Stadium					FloSports			

Legend: = Win = Loss = Canceled
Bold = UNCW team member * = Non-conference game
Rankings are based on the team's current ranking in the D1Baseball poll.
