= 2025 UNC Wilmington Seahawks baseball team =

Baseball team season

2025 UNC Wilmington Seahawks baseball
- Conference: Coastal Athletic Association
- Record: 29–22 (16–8 CAA)
- Head coach: Randy Hood (6th season)
- Assistant coaches: Josh Stott (2nd season); Taber Mongero (2nd season)
- Hitting coach: Chris Moore (8th season)
- Pitching coach: Kelly Secrest (7th season)
- Home stadium: Brooks Field

2025 Coastal Athletic Association baseball standings
	Conf.				Overall
Team	W		L	PCT	W		L	PCT
No. 19 Northeastern ‍†‍‡‍^{y}	25	–	2	.926	49	–	11	.817
UNCW ‍‍‍	19	–	8	.704	34	–	24	.586
Charleston ‍‍‍	15	–	12	.556	37	–	22	.627
Campbell ‍‍‍	15	–	12	.556	25	–	31	.446
William & Mary ‍‍‍	14	–	13	.519	21	–	35	.375
Elon ‍‍‍	13	–	14	.481	25	–	32	.439
Delaware ‍‍‍	12	–	15	.444	28	–	25	.528
Stony Brook ‍‍‍	11	–	16	.407	25	–	27	.481
Towson ‍‍‍	11	–	16	.407	21	–	35	.375
Monmouth ‍‍‍	10	–	17	.370	24	–	30	.444
North Carolina A&T ‍‍‍	9	–	18	.333	15	–	37	.288
Hofstra ‍‍‍	8	–	19	.296	18	–	36	.333
† – Conference champion ‡ – Tournament champion y – Invited to the NCAA Tournament; As of June 1, 2025; Rankings from D1Baseball

The 2025 UNCW Seahawks baseball team represent the University of North Carolina, Wilmington during the 2025 NCAA Division I baseball season. The Seahawks play their home games at Brooks Field as a member of the Coastal Athletic Association. They are led by head coach Randy Hood, in his fifth year as head coach.

== Preseason ==
=== Coaches poll ===
The coaches poll was released on February 5, 2025. UNCW was selected to win the conference.

Coaches' Poll
Predicted finish	Team	Points
1	UNCW	117 (8)
2	Charleston	109 (3)
3	Northeastern	107 (1)
4	Campbell	78
5	Delaware	77
6	Elon	70
7	Stony Brook	56
8	William & Mary	55
9	Hofstra	51
10	North Carolina A&T	37
11	Monmouth	19
12	Towson	16

=== Awards and honors ===
==== Preseason CAA awards and honors ====
Preseason All-CAA Team
Player	No.	Position	Class	Designation
Tanner Thach	29	INF	Junior	First Team
Zane Taylor	33	SP	Senior	First Team
Kevin Jones	10	INF	Senior	Honorable Mention
Alec DeMartino	5	OF	RS Junior	Honorable Mention
Connor Kane	11	RP	Junior	Honorable Mention

== Personnel ==
=== Starters ===
Lineup
Pos.	No.	Player.	Year
C	12	Bryant Arendt	Senior
1B	29	Tanner Thach	Junior
2B	7	Aiden Evans	Junior
3B	15	Trevor Lucas	Sophomore
SS	10	Kevin Jones	Senior
LF	16	Brock Willis	Junior
CF	35	Mac Gillespie	Junior
RF	5	Alec DeMartino	RS Junior
DH	22	Kevin Novobilsky	RS Junior

Weekend pitching rotation
Day	No.	Player.	Year
Friday	33	Zane Taylor	Senior
Saturday	43	Trace Baker	Junior
Sunday	13	Cam Bagwell	Freshman
Midweek	25	Connor Marshburn	Sophomore

=== Roster ===
2025 UNCW Seahawks baseball team
Players
Coaches

#	Pos.	Name	B/T	Height	Weight	Year	Home town
1	UTL	Brady Thompson	L/R	6 ft 3 in (1.91 m)	200 lb (91 kg)	Fr	Charlotte, NC
2	INF	Dylan Schaefer	R/R	6 ft 0 in (1.83 m)	175 lb (79 kg)	So	Tega Cay, SC
5	OF	Alec DeMartino	R/R	6 ft 3 in (1.91 m)	210 lb (95 kg)	RS Jr	Raleigh, NC
6	INF	Mason Hughes	L/R	6 ft 0 in (1.83 m)	180 lb (82 kg)	Fr	Eastover, NC
7	OF	Aiden Evans	R/R	5 ft 11 in (1.8 m)	180 lb (82 kg)	Jr	Cornelius, NC
9	RHP	Kyle Dobos	R/R	6 ft 1 in (1.85 m)	180 lb (82 kg)	So	Waxhaw, NC
10	INF	Kevin Jones	R/R	5 ft 11 in (1.8 m)	195 lb (88 kg)	Sr	Rolesville, NC
11	RHP	Connor Kane	S/R	6 ft 0 in (1.83 m)	180 lb (82 kg)	Jr	Wilmington, NC
12	C	Bryan Arendt	R/R	6 ft 2 in (1.88 m)	210 lb (95 kg)	Sr	Holly Springs, NC
13	RHP	Cam Bagwell	R/R	6 ft 5 in (1.96 m)	205 lb (93 kg)	Fr	Pineville, NC
14	LHP	Cyle Phelan	L/L	6 ft 3 in (1.91 m)	215 lb (98 kg)	Sr	Fuquay-Varina, NC
15	INF	Trevor Lucas	R/R	6 ft 0 in (1.83 m)	190 lb (86 kg)	So	Leland, NC
16	INF	Brock Wills	L/R	6 ft 0 in (1.83 m)	185 lb (84 kg)	Jr	Holly Springs, NC
18	UTL	Cooper Allen	R/R	6 ft 1 in (1.85 m)	200 lb (91 kg)	So	Wake Forest, NC
19	OF	Nick Coggins	L/R	5 ft 9 in (1.75 m)	180 lb (82 kg)	Fr	Mooresville, NC
20	RHP	Mason Murdock	R/R	6 ft 5 in (1.96 m)	220 lb (100 kg)	Jr	Kannapolis, NC
21	UTL	Bromley Thornton	R/R	6 ft 4 in (1.93 m)	210 lb (95 kg)	So	Wilmington, NC
22	INF	Kevin Novobilsky	L/R	6 ft 0 in (1.83 m)	200 lb (91 kg)	RS Jr	Ocean, NJ
23	LHP	JD Everett	R/L	5 ft 11 in (1.8 m)	230 lb (104 kg)	Sr	Hickory, NC
24	C	JT Stiner	R/R	5 ft 10 in (1.78 m)	220 lb (100 kg)	Fr	Westfield, IN
25	RHP	Connor Marshburn	R/R	6 ft 6 in (1.98 m)	250 lb (113 kg)	So	Cary, NC
26	LHP	Porter Braddy	L/L	5 ft 11 in (1.8 m)	195 lb (88 kg)	Fr	Kill Devil Hills, NC
27	RHP	Khristopher Morris	R/R	6 ft 3 in (1.91 m)	215 lb (98 kg)	Sr	Edenton, NC
28	RHP	Cole Nelson	R/R	6 ft 3 in (1.91 m)	210 lb (95 kg)	So	Charlotte, NC
29	INF	Tanner Thach	L/L	6 ft 4 in (1.93 m)	225 lb (102 kg)	Jr	Belvidere, NC
30	RHP	Aubrey Smith	L/R	6 ft 3 in (1.91 m)	205 lb (93 kg)	Jr	Leland, NC
31	OF	BJ Brown	R/R	5 ft 11 in (1.8 m)	185 lb (84 kg)	Fr	Sanford, NC
32	INF	Ryker Galaska	L/R	6 ft 1 in (1.85 m)	210 lb (95 kg)	RS Jr	Greenville, NC
33	RHP	Zane Taylor	R/R	6 ft 0 in (1.83 m)	200 lb (91 kg)	Sr	Franklinton, NC
34	C	Martin Zelenka	R/R	6 ft 3 in (1.91 m)	255 lb (116 kg)	Sr	Prague, CZE
35	OF	Mac Gillespie	R/R	6 ft 3 in (1.91 m)	185 lb (84 kg)	Jr	Apex, NC
36	OF	Blake Crawford	R/R	6 ft 2 in (1.88 m)	200 lb (91 kg)	Fr	Kinston, NC
37	LHP	Jack Gibson	L/L	6 ft 2 in (1.88 m)	205 lb (93 kg)	So	Southern Shores, NC
38	LHP	Mason Child	R/L	6 ft 1 in (1.85 m)	190 lb (86 kg)	Fr	Charlotte, NC
39	UTL	Clay Masonis	R/R	6 ft 1 in (1.85 m)	190 lb (86 kg)	Fr	Charlotte, NC
41	LHP	Baker Cox	L/L	6 ft 0 in (1.83 m)	195 lb (88 kg)	Sr	Hopkins, SC
43	RHP	Trace Baker	R/R	6 ft 4 in (1.93 m)	230 lb (104 kg)	Jr	Winterville, NC
44	RHP	Ty Lawson	R/R	6 ft 5 in (1.96 m)	210 lb (95 kg)	Jr	Whiteville, NC
45	UTL	Carver Pleasant	L/L	6 ft 1 in (1.85 m)	205 lb (93 kg)	Fr	Hurdle Mills, NC
48	C	Josh Martinez	R/R	5 ft 10 in (1.78 m)	205 lb (93 kg)	Fr	Holly Springs, NC
49	RHP	Will Everett	R/R	6 ft 0 in (1.83 m)	175 lb (79 kg)	Fr	Hickory, NC
50	OF	Bill Tyrrell	L/R	5 ft 11 in (1.8 m)	180 lb (82 kg)	So	Nashville, TN

Head coach

Randy Hood

Assistant coach(es)

Josh Stott
Taber Mongero
Chris Moore
Kelly Secrest

Legend

- (C) Team captain
- (S) Suspended
- (I) Ineligible
- Injured
- Current redshirt

Roster
Last update: February 27, 2025

== Offseason ==
=== Departures ===
Offseason departures
Name	Number	Pos.	Height	Weight	Year	Hometown	Notes
Trevor Marsh	1	OF	5 ft 11 in (1.80 m)	200 pounds (91 kg)	RS Senior	Asheboro, NC	Graduated
Jac Croom	6	INF	6 ft 1 in (1.85 m)	210 pounds (95 kg)	RS Senior	Wilmington, NC	Graduated
Carter Holjes	13	RHP	6 ft 6 in (1.98 m)	230 pounds (100 kg)	RS Senior	Cary, NC	Graduated
Cody Benton	24	RHP	6 ft 3 in (1.91 m)	220 pounds (100 kg)	RS Senior	Cerro Gordo, NC	Graduated
R.J. Sales	26	RHP	6 ft 0 in (1.83 m)	170 pounds (77 kg)	Junior	Pinehurst, NC	Declare for 2024 MLB draft; selected 296th overall by Detroit Tigers
Cole Benton	39	LHP	6 ft 3 in (1.91 m)	220 pounds (100 kg)	RS Senior	Cerro Gordo, NC	Graduated
Case Stroup	32	LHP	6 ft 4 in (1.93 m)	220 pounds (100 kg)	Senior	Apex, NC	Graduated
Ryan Calvert	36	UTL	6 ft 5 in (1.96 m)	240 pounds (110 kg)	Senior	La Plata, MD	Graduated
Matt Gaither	38	LHP	6 ft 4 in (1.93 m)	200 pounds (91 kg)	RS Senior	Midlothian, VA	Graduated
Jacob Shafer	45	RHP	6 ft 8 in (2.03 m)	240 pounds (110 kg)	Senior	High Point, NC	Declare for 2024 MLB draft; selected 521st overall by Atlanta Braves
Luke Craig	48	LHP	6 ft 2 in (1.88 m)	205 pounds (93 kg)	Senior	Sanford, NC	Declare for 2024 MLB draft; selected 224th overall by Arizona Diamondbacks

==== Outgoing transfers ====
Outgoing transfers
Name	Number	Pos.	Height	Weight	Hometown	Year	New school	Source

==== 2024 MLB draft ====
2024 UNCW Draft Class
Round	Pick	Overall pick	Player	Position	MLB team	Source
7	29	224	Luke Craig	P	Arizona Diamondbacks	
10	11	296	R.J. Sales	P	Detroit Tigers	
17	26	521	Jacob Shafer	P	Atlanta Braves	

=== Acquisitions ===
==== Incoming transfers ====
Incoming transfers
Name	Number	Pos.	Height	Weight	Hometown	Year	Previous school	Source
Trevor Lucas	15	INF	6 ft 0 in (1.83 m)	190 pounds (86 kg)	Leland, NC	Sophomore	Gaston (Note: Junior college)	
Porter Braddy	26	LHP	5 ft 11 in (1.80 m)	190 pounds (86 kg)	Kill Devil Hills, NC	Freshman	Maryland–Eastern Shore	
Kristopher Morris	27	RHP	6 ft 3 in (1.91 m)	215 pounds (98 kg)	Edenton, NC	Senior	West Virginia State	
Ryan Galaska	32	INF	6 ft 1 in (1.85 m)	210 pounds (95 kg)	Greenville, NC	RS Junior	North Carolina	

==== Incoming recruits ====
2024 UNCW Recruits
Name	Number	B/T	Pos.	Height	Weight	Hometown	High School	Source
Brady Thompson	1	L/R	UTL	6 ft 3 in (1.91 m)	200 pounds (91 kg)	Charlotte, NC	Providence (NC)	
Mason Hughes	6	L/R	INF	6 ft 0 in (1.83 m)	180 pounds (82 kg)	Eastover, NC	Cape Fear	
Cam Bagwell	13	R/R	RHP	6 ft 5 in (1.96 m)	205 pounds (93 kg)	Pineville, NC	South Mecklenburg	
Nick Coggins	19	L/R	OF	5 ft 9 in (1.75 m)	180 pounds (82 kg)	Mooresville, NC	Southlake Christian	
JT Stiner	24	R/R	C	5 ft 10 in (1.78 m)	220 pounds (100 kg)	Westfield, IN	Cathedral (IN)	
BJ Brown	31	R/R	OF	5 ft 11 in (1.80 m)	185 pounds (84 kg)	Samford, NC	Lee County (NC)	
Blake Crawford	36	R/R	OF	6 ft 2 in (1.88 m)	200 pounds (91 kg)	Kinston, NC	North Lenior	
Mason Child	38	R/L	LHP	6 ft 1 in (1.85 m)	190 pounds (86 kg)	Charlotte, NC	Charlotte Catholic	
Clay Masonis	39	R/R	UTL	6 ft 1 in (1.85 m)	190 pounds (86 kg)	Charlotte, NC	Myers Park	
Carver Pleasant	45	L/L	UTL	6 ft 1 in (1.85 m)	205 pounds (93 kg)	Hurdle Mills, NC	Roxboro Christian	
Josh Martinez	48	R/R	C	5 ft 10 in (1.78 m)	205 pounds (93 kg)	Holly Springs, NC	Pro5 Academy	
Will Everett	49	R/R	RHP	6 ft 0 in (1.83 m)	175 pounds (79 kg)	Hickory, NC	St. Stephens (NC)	

== Game log ==
2025 UNC Wilmington Seahawks baseball Game Log (26–21)
Regular season (26–21)

February (6–4)
Date	Opponent	Rank	Site/Stadium	Score	Win	Loss	Save	TV	Attendance	Overall Record	CAA Record
February 14	Quinnipiac*		Brooks Field; Wilmington, NC	**W** 12–1^{8}	**Taylor** (1–0)	Balcom (0–1)	None	WSFX	1,406	1–0	–
February 15	No. 8 Georgia*		Brooks Field	**L** 3–7	Davis II (1–0)	**Smith** (0–1)	None	FloSports	2,432	1–1	—
February 15	Quinnipiac*		Brooks Field	**L** 6–10^{10}	Francon (1–0)	**Gibson** (0–1)	Knox (1)	FloSports	2,432	1–2	—
February 16	No. 8 Georgia*		Brooks Field	**W** 6–2	**Marshburn** (1–0)	Brown (0–1)	None	FloSports	1,527	2–2	—
February 18	at No. 17 Duke*		Jack Coombs Field; Durham, NC	**L** 4–8	Calvert (1–0)	**Smith** (0–2)	None	ACCNX	393	2–3	—
February 21	UNC Asheville*		Brooks Field	**W** 13–1	**Taylor** (2–0)	Guy (1–1)	None	WSFX	1,237	3–3	—
February 22	UNC Asheville*		Brooks Field	**W** 4–3	**Phelan** (1–0)	Edmondson (0–1)	None	FloSports	1,320	4–3	—
February 23	UNC Asheville*		Brooks Field	**W** 7–1	**Bagwell** (1–0)	Nguyen–Brown (0–1)	None	FloSports	1,752	5–3	—
February 25	at No. 24 Coastal Carolina*		Springs Brooks Stadium; Conway, SC	**L** 1–6	Potok (1–0)	**Phelan** (1–1)	None	ESPN+	2,653	5–4	—
February 28	Liberty*		Brooks Field	**W** 6–3	**Zane** (3–0)	Mathiesen (1–1)	**Baker** (1)	WSFX	1,128	6–4	—

March (8–10)
Date	Opponent	Rank	Site/Stadium	Score	Win	Loss	Save	TV	Attendance	Overall Record	CAA Record
March 1	Liberty*		Brooks Field	**L** 2–4	Blair (1–0)	**Marshburn** (1–1)	August (1)	FloSports	1,403	6–5	—
March 2	Liberty*		Brooks Field	**W** 5–3	**Bagwell** (2–0)	Swink (2–1)	**Baker** (2)	FloSports	1,225	7–5	—
March 4	at Louisiana*		Tigue Moore Field; Lafayette, LA	**L** 5–6	Mandino (1–0)	**Lawson** (0–1)	Marcotte (1)	ESPN+	3,372	7–6	—
March 7	at No. 20 Southern Miss*		Pete Taylor Park; Hattiesburg, MS	**W** 6–3	**Taylor** (4–0)	Middleton (2–1)	**Baker** (3)	ESPN+	5,357	8–6	—
March 8	at No. 20 Southern Miss*		Pete Taylor Park	**L** 1–2	Allen (2–1)	**Smith** (0–3)	None	ESPN+	5,365	8–7	—
March 9	at No. 20 Southern Miss*		Pete Taylor Park	**L** 4–7	Willoughby (1–0)	**Murdock** (0–1)	Allen (3)	ESPN+	5,259	8–8	—
March 11	No. 6 North Carolina*		Brooks Field	**L** 3–7	Matthijs (1–0)	**Baker** (0–1)	None	WSFX	3,242	8–9	—
March 14	Charlotte*		Brooks Field	**W** 11–4	**Taylor** (5–0)	Gillespie (1–3)	None	FloSports	1,382	9–9	—
March 15	Charlotte*		Brooks Field	**L** 2–5	Jones (1–0)	**Cox** (0–1)	Taylor (3)	WSFX		9–10	—
March 15	Charlotte*		Brooks Field	**W** 6–4	**Bagwell** (3–0)	Wagner (1–1)	**Phelan** (1)	WSFX	1,753	10–10	—
March 18	vs. East Carolina		Segra Stadium; Fayetteville, NC	**W** 9–4	**Smith** (1–3)	White Jr. (2–1)	None		1,235	11–10	—
March 21	at Campbell		Jim Perry Stadium; Buies Creek, NC	**L** 2–3	Murray (2–1)	**Taylor** (5–1)	Schares (2)	FloSports	1,033	11–11	0–1
March 22	at Campbell		Jim Perry Stadium	**L** 9–17	Grubich (1–1)	**Gibson** (0–2)	None	FloSports	1,192	11–12	0–2
March 23	at Campbell		Jim Perry Stadium	**W** 12–0^{7}	**Bagwell** (4–0)	Rossow (2–3)	None	FloSports	945	12–12	1–2
March 25	Charleston Southern*		Brooks Field	**W** 5–3	**Baker** (1–1)	Gastman (0–1)	**Phelan** (2)	WSFX	1,407	13–12	—
March 28	North Carolina A&T		Brooks Field	**L** 3–5	Ortiz (4–2)	**Marshburn** (1–2)	Halford (1)	FloSports	1,428	13–13	1–3
March 29	North Carolina A&T		Brooks Field	**L** 3–4^{16}	Robinson (2–0)	**Thornton** (0–1)	Davis (1)	FloSports	1,630	13–14	1–4
March 30	North Carolina A&T		Brooks Field	**W** 13–0	**Bagwell** (5–0)	Sentell (1–4)	None	FloSports	1,436	14–14	2–4

April (2–2)
Date	Opponent	Rank	Site/Stadium	Score	Win	Loss	Save	TV	Attendance	Overall Record	CAA Record
April 1	East Carolina*		Brooks Field	**L** 6–10^{10}	Young (3–0)	**Phelan** (1–2)	None	FloSports	3,122	14–15	—
April 4	at Hofstra		University Field; Hempstead, NY	**W** 12–4	**Taylor** (6–1)	Hamilton (0–1)	**Baker** (4)	FloSports		15–15	3–4
April 5	at Hofstra		University Field	**W** 9–2	**Marshburn** (2–2)	Bauer (2–4)	**Smith** (1)	FloSports	150	16–15	4–4
April 6	at Hofstra		University Field	**L** 4–6	Nemjo (1–3)	**Bagwell** (5–1)	Sanderoff (1)	FloSports	100	16–16	4–5
April 8	No. 21 Coastal Carolina*		Brooks Field					FloSports			—
April 11	William & Mary		Brooks Field					FloSports			
April 12	William & Mary		Brooks Field					FloSports			
April 13	William & Mary		Brooks Field					FloSports			
April 15	at East Carolina*		Clark–LeClair Stadium; Greenville, NC								—
April 17	at Towson		Schuerholz Park; Towson, MD								
April 18	at Towson		Schuerholz Park								
April 19	at Towson		Schuerholz Park								
April 25	at Charleston		Patriot's Point Ballpark; Mount Pleasant, SC								
April 26	at Charleston		Patriot's Point Ballpark								
April 27	at Charleston		Patriot's Point Ballpark								
April 29	at No. 13 NC State*		Doak Field; Raleigh, NC					ACCNX			—

May
Date	Opponent	Rank	Site/Stadium	Score	Win	Loss	Save	TV	Attendance	Overall Record	CAA Record
May 2	Monmouth		Brooks Field					FloSports			
May 3	Monmouth		Brooks Field					FloSports			
May 4	Monmouth		Brooks Field					FloSports			
May 6	No. 16 NC State*		Brooks Field					FloSports			—
May 9	Stony Brook		Brooks Field					FloSports			
May 10	Stony Brook		Brooks Field					FloSports			
May 11	Stony Brook		Brooks Field					WSFX			
May 13	at No. 4 North Carolina*		Boshamer Stadium; Chapel Hill, NC					ACCNX			—
May 15	at Elon		Latham Park; Elon, NC								
May 16	at Elon		Latham Park								
May 17	at Elon		Latham Park								

Legend: = Win = Loss = Canceled
Bold = UNCW team member * = Non-conference game
Rankings are based on the team's current ranking in the D1Baseball poll.

== Rankings ==
Ranking movements Legend: ██ Increase in ranking ██ Decrease in ranking — = Not ranked RV = Received votes
	Week																		
Poll	Pre	1	2	3	4	5	6	7	8	9	10	11	12	13	14	15	16	17	Final
Coaches'	RV	RV*	—	—	—														
Baseball America	—	—	—	—	—														
NCBWA†	—	—	—	—	—														
D1Baseball	—	—	—	—	—														
Perfect Game	—	—	—	—	—														

† NCBWA ranks 30 teams in their preseason poll, but only ranks 25 teams weekly during the season.
* A new poll was not released for this week, so for comparison purposes, the previous week's ranking is inserted in this week's slot.
