= Belvidere Historic District =

Belvidere Historic District may refer to:

- Belvidere Historic District (Hertford, North Carolina), on the National Register of Historic Places
- Belvidere Historic District (Belvidere, New Jersey), on the National Register of Historic Places

== See also ==
- Belvidere Hill Historic District, Lowell, Massachusetts, on the National Register of Historic Places
- Belvidere (disambiguation)
