= Belvidere Township =

Belvidere Township may refer to the following places in the United States:

- Belvidere Township, Boone County, Illinois
- Belvidere Township, Michigan
- Belvidere Township, Minnesota

== See also ==
- Belvidere (disambiguation)
