= 2025 Coastal Athletic Association baseball tournament =

American college baseball tournament

- Teams: 6
- Format: modified Double-elimination tournament
- Finals site: CofC Baseball Stadium at Patriots Point; Mount Pleasant, SC
- Champions: Northeastern (2nd title)
- Winning coach: Mike Glavine (2nd title)
- MVP: Harrison Feinberg (Northeastern)
- Television: FloSports

2025 Coastal Athletic Association baseball standings
	Conf.				Overall
Team	W		L	PCT	W		L	PCT
No. 19 Northeastern ‍†‍‡‍^{y}	25	–	2	.926	49	–	11	.817
UNCW ‍‍‍	19	–	8	.704	34	–	24	.586
Charleston ‍‍‍	15	–	12	.556	37	–	22	.627
Campbell ‍‍‍	15	–	12	.556	25	–	31	.446
William & Mary ‍‍‍	14	–	13	.519	21	–	35	.375
Elon ‍‍‍	13	–	14	.481	25	–	32	.439
Delaware ‍‍‍	12	–	15	.444	28	–	25	.528
Stony Brook ‍‍‍	11	–	16	.407	25	–	27	.481
Towson ‍‍‍	11	–	16	.407	21	–	35	.375
Monmouth ‍‍‍	10	–	17	.370	24	–	30	.444
North Carolina A&T ‍‍‍	9	–	18	.333	15	–	37	.288
Hofstra ‍‍‍	8	–	19	.296	18	–	36	.333
† – Conference champion ‡ – Tournament champion y – Invited to the NCAA Tournament; As of June 1, 2025; Rankings from D1Baseball

The 2025 Coastal Athletic Association baseball tournament was held at CofC Baseball Stadium at Patriots Point in Mount Pleasant, SC, from May 21 through 24. The Northeastern Huskies won their second CAA tournament championship in school history, going undefeated in the tournament. With the win, they also earned the conference's automatic bid to the 2025 NCAA Division I baseball tournament.

== Seeding and format ==
Continuing the format adopted in 2012, the top six finishers from the regular season competed in the modified double-elimination tournament in which each round is reseeded so that the top remaining seed plays the lowest remaining seed. Northeastern entered the tournament as the number one overall seed after setting a school record for wins in a season with 45. They also enter the conference tournament with a 24 game win streak.

== Bracket ==
Upper round 1	Upper round 2	Upper final	Final
4	College of Charleston	0
5	William & Mary	0	1	Northeastern	6
4	College of Charleston	12 (7)	2	UNC Wilmington	1
1	Northeastern	11
3	Campbell	0
6	Elon	9	2	UNC Wilmington	6
3	Campbell	10
2	UNC Wilmington	6	-
1	Northeastern	9	-
Lower round 1	Lower round 2	Lower round 3	Lower final
2	UNC Wilmington	6
4	College of Charleston	12	4	College of Charleston	5
6	Elon	2	3	Campbell	11
6	Elon	7	4	College of Charleston	4
5	William & Mary	4

== Schedule ==
Game	Time*	Matchup^{#}	Score	Notes	Reference
Wednesday, May 21
1	12:00 pm	No. 4 College of Charleston vs No. 5 William & Mary	12−0 (7)	game ended in 7th inning due to run rule	
2	4:00 pm	No. 3 Campbell vs No. 6 Elon	10-9	won on walk-off home run in bottom of the 9th inning	
Thursday, May 22
3	11:00 am	No. 6 Elon vs No. 5 William & Mary	7-4	William & Mary Eliminated	
4	3:00 pm	No. 4 College of Charleston vs. No. 1 Northeastern	0-6		
5	7:00 pm	No. 3 Campbell vs. No. 2 UNCW	0-6		
Friday, May 23
6	11:00 am	No. 6 Elon vs No. 4 College of Charleston	2-4	Elon Eliminated	
7	3:00 pm	No. 4 College of Charleston vs No. 3 Campbell	12-11	Campbell Eliminated	
8	7:00 pm	No. 2 UNC Wilmington vs No. 1 Northeastern	1-11		
Saturday, May 24
9	1:00 pm	No. 4 College of Charleston vs No. 2 UNC Wilmington	5-6	College of Charleston Eliminated	
10	5:00 pm	No. 2 UNC Wilmington vs No. 1 Northeastern	6-9	Northeastern wins championship	
Sunday, May 25
11	1:00 pm	Rematch of Game 10		Game not necessary	
*Game times in EDT. # – Rankings denote tournament seed.

== All–Tournament Team ==
Player	Team
Harrison Feinberg (MVP)	Northeastern
Bryan Arendt	UNC Wilmington
Jake Brink	College of Charleston
Brett Dunham	Northeastern
Ryan Gerety	Northeastern
Jordan Gottesman	Northeastern
Dylan Johnson	College of Charleston
Carmelo Musacchia	Northeastern
Aubrey Smith	UNC Wilmington
Zane Taylor	UNC Wilmington
Tanner Thach	UNC Wilmington
