= 2025 Northeastern Huskies baseball team =

American college baseball season

2025 Northeastern Huskies baseball
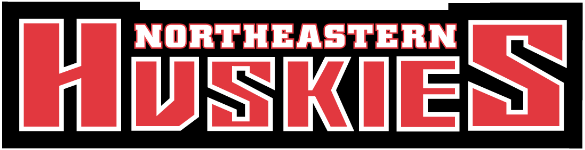

CAA regular season & tournament champions

NCAA Tallahassee Regional, 1–2
- Conference: Coastal Athletic Association

Ranking
- Coaches: No. 21
- D1Baseball.com: No. 19
- Record: 49–11 (25–2 CAA)
- Head coach: Mike Glavine (11th season)
- Associate head coach: Kevin Cobb (13th season)
- Assistant coaches: Omar Rouhana (17th season); Johnny Adams; Will Butts
- Pitching coach: Kyle Greenler
- Home stadium: Parsons Field

2025 Coastal Athletic Association baseball standings
	Conf.				Overall
Team	W		L	PCT	W		L	PCT
No. 19 Northeastern ‍†‍‡‍^{y}	25	–	2	.926	49	–	11	.817
UNCW ‍‍‍	19	–	8	.704	34	–	24	.586
Charleston ‍‍‍	15	–	12	.556	37	–	22	.627
Campbell ‍‍‍	15	–	12	.556	25	–	31	.446
William & Mary ‍‍‍	14	–	13	.519	21	–	35	.375
Elon ‍‍‍	13	–	14	.481	25	–	32	.439
Delaware ‍‍‍	12	–	15	.444	28	–	25	.528
Stony Brook ‍‍‍	11	–	16	.407	25	–	27	.481
Towson ‍‍‍	11	–	16	.407	21	–	35	.375
Monmouth ‍‍‍	10	–	17	.370	24	–	30	.444
North Carolina A&T ‍‍‍	9	–	18	.333	15	–	37	.288
Hofstra ‍‍‍	8	–	19	.296	18	–	36	.333
† – Conference champion ‡ – Tournament champion y – Invited to the NCAA Tournament; As of June 1, 2025; Rankings from D1Baseball

The 2025 Northeastern Huskies baseball team represented Northeastern University during the 2025 NCAA Division I baseball season. The Huskies played their home games at Parsons Field in nearby Brookline, Massachusetts, and were coached by Mike Glavine, in his 11th season managing the program.

The 2025 season was the winningest season in program history, as the Huskies amassed a record of 49–11 and a Coastal Athletic Association record of 25–2. The total winning percentage of .817 was the program's highest ever winning percentage, and the first time since 1942 the program had an end-of-season winning percentage of .800 or higher.

Northeastern won both the CAA regular season and the 2025 Coastal Athletic Association baseball tournament, earning a berth into the 2025 NCAA Division I baseball tournament. There, the Huskies received the two-seed in the Tallahassee Regional, where they finished with a 1–2 record before being eliminated.

== Preseason ==
=== Preseason CAA awards and honors ===
Preseason awards were announced on February 4, 2025.

Preseason All-CAA Team
Player	No.	Position	Class
Gregory Bozzo	-	C	Graduate
Jack Goodman	-	IF	Junior
Alex Lane	-	OF	Graduate
Cam Maldonado	-	OF	Junior
Jack Beauchesne	-	RP	Senior

=== Coaches poll ===
The coaches poll was released in February 2025. Northeastern was picked to finish third in the CAA.

Coaches' Poll
Predicted finish	Team	Points
1	UNCW	117 (8)
2	College of Charleston	109 (3)
3	Northeastern	107 (1)
4	Campbell	78
5	Delaware	77
6	Elon	70
7	Stony Brook	56
8	William & Mary	55
9	Hofstra	51
10	North Carolina A&T	37
11	Monmouth	19
12	Towson	16

== Personnel ==
=== Starters ===
Lineup
Pos.	No.	Player.	Year
C	-	Gregory Bozzo	-
1B	-	David Pengel	-
2B	-	Carmelo Musacchia	-
3B	-	Luc Rising	-
SS	-	Chris Walsh	-
LF	-	Spencer Sullivan	-
CF	-	Tom Mahoney	-
RF	-	Harrison Feinberg	-
DH	-	Matt Brinker	-

Weekend pitching rotation
Day	No.	Player.	Year
Friday	-	Danny Flynn	-
Saturday	-	Andrew Wertz	-
Sunday	-	Cooper Maher	-

== Game log ==
2025 Northeastern Huskies baseball game log (0–0)
Regular season: 0–0 (Home: 0–0; Away: 0–0; Neutral: 0–0)

February: 3–3 (Home: 0–0; Away: 1–2; Neutral: 2–1)
Date	TV	Opponent	Rank	Stadium	Score	Win	Loss	Save	Attendance	Overall	CAA
February 14	ESPN+	at Charlotte*		Hayes Stadium; Charlotte, NC	L 1–6	Szturma (1–0)	Flynn (0–1)	Taylor (1)	708	0–1	—
February 15	ESPN+	at Charlotte*		Hayes Stadium	W 3–1	Wertz (1–0)	Gillespie (0–1)	Beauchesne (1)	708	1–1	—
February 16	ESPN+	at Charlotte*		Hayes Stadium	Canceled (inclement weather)						
February 21	NESN	at Boston Red Sox*		Jet Blue Park; Fort Myers, FL	L 2–5	Webb	Basel	Harris	6,794	— (Note: Exhibition game.)	
February 22 (Note: Part of a doubleheader.)	FloSports	vs. Indiana State*		Centennial Park; Port Charlotte, FL	W 7–0	Flynn (1–1)	Karst (0–1)	None	468	2–1	—
February 22	FloSports	vs. Indiana State*		Centennial Park	W 5–0	Wertz (2–0)	Parson (1–1)	Sapienza (1)	468	3–1	—
February 23	FloSports	vs. Indiana State*		Centennial Park	L 4–5	Morris (1–1)	Beauchesne (0–1)	None	405	3–2	—
February 28		at Hawaii*		Les Murakami Stadium; Honolulu, HI	L 5–11	Rodriguez (1–0)	Sapienza (0–1)	None	3,509	3–3	—

March: 0–0 (Home: 0–0; Away: 0–0; Neutral: 0–0)
Date	TV	Opponent	Rank	Stadium	Score	Win	Loss	Save	Attendance	Overall	CAA
March 1	ESPN+	at Hawaii*		Les Murakami Stadium	W 7–1	Wertz (3–0)	Takemoto (1–2)	None	4,472	4–3	—
February 28	ESPN+	at Hawaii*		Les Murakami Stadium	L 3–11	O'Brien (2–0)	Flynn (1–2)	None	3,485	4–4	—

April (9–7)
Date	TV	Opponent	Rank	Stadium	Score	Win	Loss	Save	Attendance	Overall	A-10	Source
April 2	FloBaseball	at William & Mary*		Plumeri Park; Williamsburg, Virginia	W 9–5	Cosentino (1–0)	Lottchea (2–1)	None	619	19–10	—	Report
April 5	ESPN+	Davidson		The Diamond	W 10–8	Tappy (5–1)	Ban (1–1)	None	222	20–10	3–1	Report
April 6	ESPN+	Davidson		The Diamond	W 7–4	Dressler (2–1)	Fix (1–2)	None	201	21–10	4–1	Report
April 7	ESPN+	Davidson		The Diamond	W 6–1	Cosentino (2–0)	Feczko (2–5)	None	362	22–10	5–1	Report
April 9	ACCNX	at No. 11 Virginia*		Davenport Field; Charlottesville, Virginia	L 4–8	Hungate (3–0)	Ellis (0–2)	None	3,281	22–11	—	Report
April 12	ESPN+	at St. Bonaventure		Fred Handler Park; Olean, New York	L 5–7	Ciampa (1–2)	Peters (2–3)	None	172	22–12	5–2	Report
April 13	ESPN+	at St. Bonaventure		Fred Handler Park	W 5–0	Gordon (4–1)	Czajkowski (2–3)	None	305	23–12	6–2	Report
April 14	ESPN+	at St. Bonaventure		Fred Handler Park	L 6–11	Roggenburk (2–0)	Everett (0–3)	None	315	23–13	6–3	Report
April 16	ESPN+	Liberty*		The Diamond	W 2–1	Hoeymans (1–1)	Swink (0–1)	Tappy (3)	324	24–13	—	Report
April 19	ESPN+	Dayton		The Diamond	L 1–5	Majick (4–2)	Cosentino (2–1)	Wissman (6)	361	24–14	6–4	Report
April 20	ESPN+	Dayton		The Diamond	W 8–3	Gordon (5–1)	Peguero (1–4)	None	407	25–14	7–4	Report
April 21	ESPN+	Dayton		The Diamond	Canceled (inclement weather)					25–14	7–4	Report
Old Dominion–VCU series
April 23	ESPN+	at Old Dominion*		Bud Metheny Field; Norfolk, Virginia	L 1–7	Sulpizio (1–0)	Hoeymans (1–2)	None	583	25–15	—	Report
George Mason–VCU series
April 26	ESPN+	at George Mason		Spuhler Field; Fairfax, Virginia	W 6–4	Tappy (6–1)	Stewart (1–2)	None	135	26–15	8–4	Report
April 27	ESPN+	at George Mason		Spuhler Field	L 2–3	Gartland (2–3)	Gordon (5–2)	None	224	26–16	8–5	Report
April 28	ESPN+	at George Mason		Spuhler Field	W 9–8	Tappy (7–1)	Edmonds (1–2)	None	390	27–16	9–5	Report
Duel at the Diamond
April 30	ESPN+	No. 11 Virginia*		The Diamond	L 4–8	Moore (2–0)	Peters (2–4)	Teel (5)	3,689	27–17	—	Report

May (6–4)
Date	Time (ET)	Opponent	Rank	Stadium	Score	Win	Loss	Save	Attendance	Overall	CAA	
May 3	ESPN+	George Washington		The Diamond	W 6–2	Hoeymans (2–2)	Brennan (1–4)	Curley (1)	532	28–17	10–5	Report
May 4	ESPN+	George Washington		The Diamond	L 8–12	Siegenthaler (5–2)	Dressler (2–2)	Wilson (4)	625	28–18	10–6	Report
May 5	ESPN+	George Washington		The Diamond	L 6–11	Haug (3–1)	Tappy (7–2)	None	323	28–19	10–7	Report
Old Dominion–VCU series
May 7	ESPN+	Old Dominion*		The Diamond	L 8–14	Kellen (4–0)	Goleski (0–1)	None	683	28–20	—	Report
May 8 (Note: Rescheduled from March 7 due to inclement weather.)	ESPN+	at No. 10 East Carolina*		Clark-LeClair Stadium; Greenville, North Carolina	Canceled (scheduling conflict)					28–20	—	Report
May 10		at Fordham		Houlihan Park; The Bronx, New York	W 4–0	Hoeymans (3–2)	Lavelle (6–5)	Curley (2)	116	29–20	11–7	Report
May 11		at Fordham		Houlihan Park	W 4–3	Martinez (4–0)	Berg (5–6)	Tappy (4)	326	30–20	12–7	Report
May 12		at Fordham		Houlihan Park	W 8–3	Vaughan (1–3)	Perez (1–2)	None	187	31–20	13–7	
Capital City series
May 16	ESPN+	at Richmond		Malcolm U. Pitt Field; Richmond, Virginia	L 10–12	Hentschel (4–1)	Nuckols (0–1)	None	308	31–21	13–8	Report
May 17	ESPN+	at Richmond		Malcolm U. Pitt Field	W 11–4	Gordon (6–2)	Roche (3–8)	None	276	32–21	14–8	Report
May 18	ESPN+	at Richmond		Malcolm U. Pitt Field	W 12–4	Dressler (3–2)	Corso (1–2)	None	215	33–21	15–8	Report

Postseason (6–2)

CAA Tournament (4–0)
Date	Time (ET)	Opponent	Rank	Stadium	Score	Win	Loss	Save	Attendance	Overall	CAAT Record	
May 21	ESPN+	vs. (7) Saint Joseph's	(2)	Capital One Park; Tysons, Virginia	W 4–2	Curley (6–0)	Yablonski (4–5)	Tappy (5)	301	34–21	1–0	Report
May 22	ESPN+	vs. (3) Dayton	(2)	Capital One Park	W 11–3	Hoeymans (4–2)	Majick (5–5)	None	464	35–21	2–0	Report
May 23	ESPN+	vs. (4) Richmond	(2)	Capital One Park	W 13–7	Gordon (7–2)	Ymker (1–3)	None	1,035	36–21	3–0	Report
May 25	ESPN+	vs. (4) Richmond	(2)	Capital One Park	W 16–1	Cosentino (3–1)	Hentschel (4–2)	None	1,152	37–21	4–0	Report

NCAA Tallahassee Regional (1–2)
Date	Time (ET)	Opponent	Rank	Stadium	Score	Win	Loss	Save	Attendance	Overall	NCAAT Record	
May 31	ESPNU	vs. (2) No. 22 Wake Forest*	(3)	Clark-LeClair Stadium	W 1–0	Gordon (8–2)	Falco Jr. (2–5)	Curley (3)	5,571	38–21	1–0	Report
June 1	ESPN+	vs. (4) Evansville*	(3)	Clark-LeClair Stadium	L 11–17	Schultz (6–2)	Cosentino (3–2)	None	5,571	38–22	1–1	Report
June 2	ESPN+	vs. No. 16 (1) East Carolina*	(3)	Clark-LeClair Stadium	L 7–10	Beal (8–2)	Hoeymans (4–3)	None	5,571	38–23	1–2	Report

Legend: = Win = Loss = Canceled
Bold =Northeastern team member
Rankings are based on the team's current ranking in the D1Baseball poll.

Schedule Notes
