= Cliffs Plantation =

Historic house in Mississippi, United States

- U.S. National Register of Historic Places
- Location within Mississippi Location within the United States
- Nearest city: Natchez, Mississippi, U.S.
- Coordinates: 31°27′39″N 91°24′56″W
- Area: 8.3 acres (3.4 ha)
- Built: 1856–1858
- Architectural style: Greek Revival
- NRHP reference No.: 80002193
- Added to NRHP: September 18, 1980

The Cliffs Plantation is a Southern plantation with a historic mansion located in Natchez, Mississippi, USA.

== History ==
The land of the Mount Hope Plantation was acquired by Thomas and Alexander Henderson, two planters of Scottish descent, in 1828. When Thomas Henderson died in 1857, it was inherited by his son John W. Henderson, an 1853 graduate of Oakland College.

Construction of the 1 1/2-story house began in 1856, and it was completed in 1858. It was built for John W. Henderson and his wife, Ellen Newman. In 1868, it was acquired by John Coulson, the former owner of Belvidere, another historic mansion purchased by Henderson shortly after. It was later sold to the Brown family, until it was purchased by Mr Meade Hufford in 1979.

== Architectural significance ==
The house was designed in the Greek Revival architectural style. It has been listed on the National Register of Historic Places since September 18, 1980.
