= Belvidere Mills, Minnesota =

Unincorporated community in Minnesota, United States

Belvidere Mills
- Unincorporated community
- Location within Minnesota Location within the United States
- Coordinates: 44°27′09″N 92°30′34″W
- Country: United States
- State: Minnesota
- County: Goodhue
- Township: Belvidere
- Elevation: 879 ft (268 m)
- Time zone: UTC-6 (Central (CST))
  - Summer (DST): UTC-5 (CDT)
- ZIP code: 55027
- Area code: 651
- GNIS feature ID: 654597

Belvidere Mills is an unincorporated community in Belvidere Township, Goodhue County, Minnesota, United States.

The community is located near the junction of County 2 Boulevard and County 3 Boulevard.

State Highway 58 (MN 58) and County Road 9 are also nearby. Wells Creek and Clear Creek both flow through the community.

Nearby places include Goodhue, Red Wing, Frontenac, Bellechester, and Lake City.

Belvidere Mills is located in sections 4 and 5 of Belvidere Township.

ZIP codes 55027 (Goodhue) and 55066 (Red Wing) meet near Belvidere Mills. The community had a post office from 1877 to 1905.
