= Monmouth Baseball Field =

Baseball venue in New Jersey

- Interactive map of Monmouth Baseball Field
- Location: Larchwood Avenue and Palmer Avenue, West Long Branch, New Jersey, USA
- Coordinates: 40.276917°N 74.008632°W
- Owner: Monmouth University
- Operator: Monmouth University
- Surface: Natural grass
- Field size: 325 ft. (LF), 365 ft. (LCF), 390 ft. (CF), 365 ft. (RCF), 320 ft. (RF)

Tenant
- Monmouth Hawks baseball (MAAC)

Monmouth Baseball Field is a baseball venue in West Long Branch, New Jersey, United States. It is home to the Monmouth Hawks baseball team of the NCAA Division I Metro Atlantic Athletic Conference. The facility is located at the southwest corner of the Monmouth campus. It features a natural grass surface and has the following dimensions: 325 ft. (LF), 365 ft. (LCF), 390 ft. (CF), 365 ft. (RCF), 320 ft. (RF).

== See also ==
- List of NCAA Division I baseball venues
