= Belvidere (Belvidere, North Carolina) =

Historic house in North Carolina, United States

- U.S. National Register of Historic Places
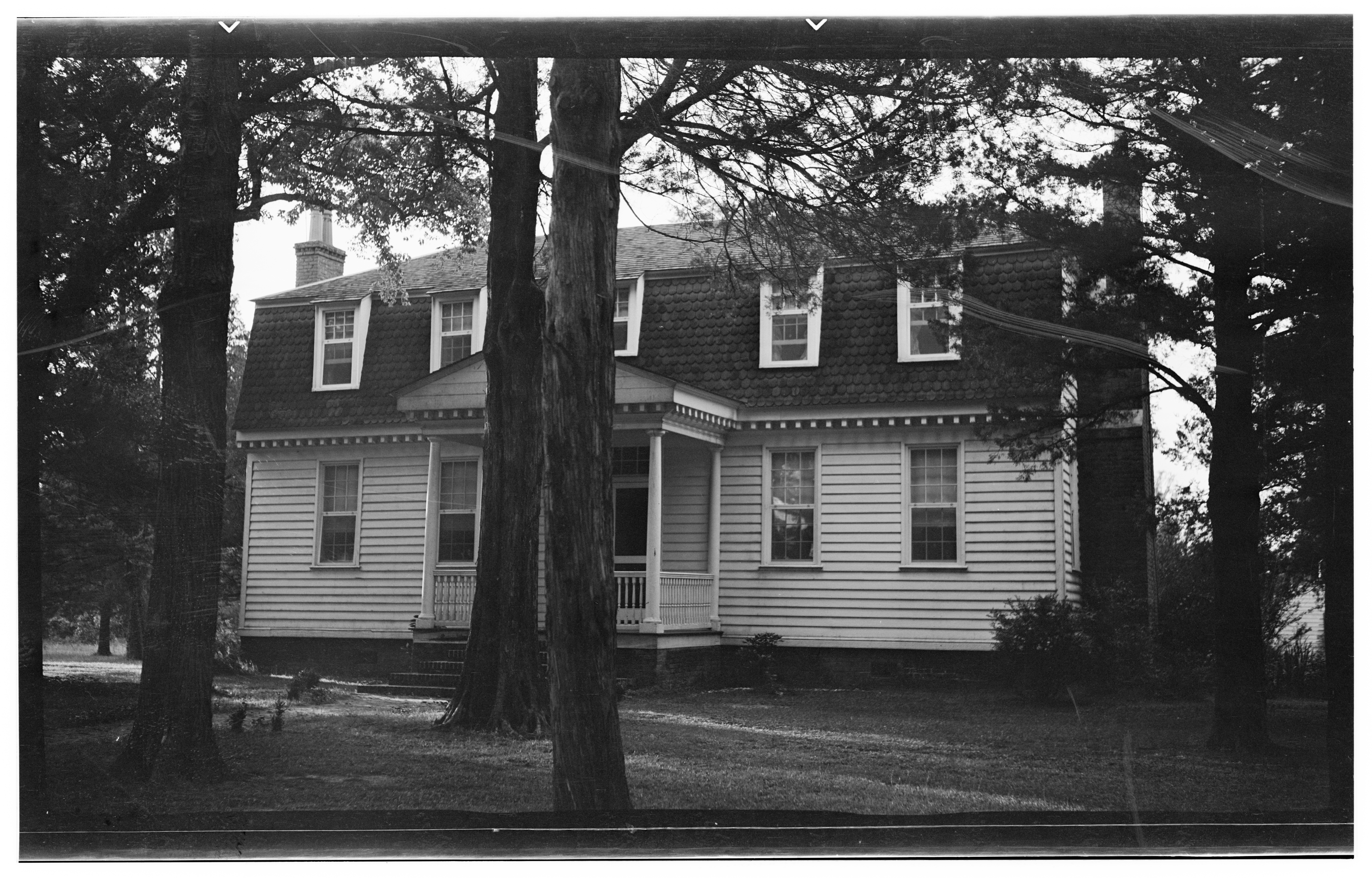
- Exum Newby House, HABS Photo, July 1940

- Location within North Carolina Location within the United States
- Location: NC 37, W of Perquimans River, Belvidere, North Carolina
- Coordinates: 36°16′8″N 76°32′48″W
- Area: 9 acres (3.6 ha)
- Built: c. 1767
- Built by: Newby, Thomas
- Architectural style: Georgian
- NRHP reference No.: 77001008
- Added to NRHP: August 2, 1977

Belvidere, also known as the Exum Newby House and Lamb House, is a historic plantation house located at Belvidere, Perquimans County, North Carolina. It was built about 1767, and is a 1 1/2-story, five-bay, frame dwelling with an unusual hip on gambrel roof. The Georgian style dwelling is sheathed in weatherboard and rests on a brick pier foundation. In the mid-1970s, Belvidere was sold to radio personality Wolfman Jack.

The house was added to the National Register of Historic Places in 1977.
