= Belvidere (Natchez, Mississippi) =

Historic house in Mississippi, United States

- U.S. National Register of Historic Places
- Location within Mississippi Location within the United States
- Location: 70 Homochitto St., Natchez, Mississippi, U.S.
- Coordinates: 31°33′3″N 91°24′1″W
- Built: c. 1837
- Architectural style: Greek Revival
- NRHP reference No.: 80002191
- Added to NRHP: April 8, 1980

Belvidere is a Southern plantation with a historic cottage located in Natchez, Mississippi, United States.

== History ==
The cottage was built circa 1837, shortly after Samuel and Robert Patterson acquired the land. In 1847, it was acquired by John Coulson, a merchant. When Coulson purchased the Cliffs Plantation from John W. Henderson in 1868, Henderson in turn purchased Belvidere.

The house was moved northwards in 1927, when the Margaret Martin Junior High School was built where it once stood.

By 1980, it still belonged to the Henderson family.

== Architectural significance ==
The cottage was designed in the Greek Revival architectural style. It has been listed on the National Register of Historic Places since April 8, 1980.
