= Belvidere Township, Illinois =

Belvidere Township
- Township
- Location in Boone County

- Boone County's location in Illinois
- Coordinates: 42°17′01″N 88°53′25″W
- Country: United States
- State: Illinois
- County: Boone
- Settlement: November 6, 1849

Area
  - Total: 36.54 sq mi (94.6 km^{2})
  - Land: 36.09 sq mi (93.5 km^{2})
  - Water: 0.45 sq mi (1.2 km^{2}) 1.23%
- Elevation: 814 ft (248 m)

Population (2020)
  - Total: 29,441
  - Density: 815.8/sq mi (315.0/km^{2})
- Time zone: UTC-6 (CST)
  - Summer (DST): UTC-5 (CDT)
- ZIP codes: 61008, 61011, 61016, 61065, 61107, 61111, 61114
- FIPS code: 17-007-05105

Belvidere Township is one of nine townships in Boone County, Illinois, United States. As of the 2020 census, its population was 29,441 and it contained 11,356 housing units.

== Geography ==
According to the 2010 census, the township has a total area of 36.54 square miles (94.6 km^{2}), of which 36.09 square miles (93.5 km^{2}) (or 98.77%) is land and 0.45 square miles (1.2 km^{2}) (or 1.23%) is water.

=== Cities ===
- Belvidere (southeast three-quarters)
- Cherry Valley (west quarter)
- Loves Park (west edge)
- Poplar Grove (northeast quarter)

=== Unincorporated towns ===
(This list is based on USGS data and may include former settlements.)

=== Cemeteries ===
The township contains these four cemeteries: Belvidere, Highland Garden of Memories, Orth and Saint James Catholic.

=== Major highways ===
- Interstate 90
- US Route 20
- Illinois State Route 76

=== Airports and landing strips ===
- Belvidere Assembly Plant Heliport
- Belvidere Limited Airport
- Poplar Grove Airport

=== Rivers ===
- Kishwaukee River

=== Landmarks ===
- Belvidere Landing Strp

== Demographics ==
As of the 2020 census there were 29,441 people, 10,814 households, and 7,386 families residing in the township. The population density was 805.41 inhabitants per square mile (310.97/km^{2}). There were 11,356 housing units at an average density of 310.66 per square mile (119.95/km^{2}). The racial makeup of the township was 69.04% White, 2.51% African American, 1.17% Native American, 1.20% Asian, 0.06% Pacific Islander, 13.70% from other races, and 12.33% from two or more races. Hispanic or Latino of any race were 27.85% of the population.

There were 10,814 households, out of which 32.40% had children under the age of 18 living with them, 48.88% were married couples living together, 14.49% had a female householder with no spouse present, and 31.70% were non-families. 27.30% of all households were made up of individuals, and 15.90% had someone living alone who was 65 years of age or older. The average household size was 2.70 and the average family size was 3.28.

The township's age distribution consisted of 24.1% under the age of 18, 9.3% from 18 to 24, 22.5% from 25 to 44, 26% from 45 to 64, and 18.0% who were 65 years of age or older. The median age was 39.9 years. For every 100 females, there were 93.5 males. For every 100 females age 18 and over, there were 93.4 males.

The median income for a household in the township was $61,338, and the median income for a family was $77,060. Males had a median income of $40,767 versus $27,764 for females. The per capita income for the township was $31,460. About 6.7% of families and 11.5% of the population were below the poverty line, including 15.1% of those under age 18 and 7.9% of those age 65 or over.

Historical population
Census	Pop.	Note	%±
2010	30,109		—
2020	29,441		−2.2%
U.S. Decennial Census

== School districts ==
- Belvidere Community Unit School District 100
- North Boone Community Unit School District 200

== Political districts ==
- Illinois' 16th congressional district
- State House District 69
- State Senate District 35
