= Belvidere, North Carolina =

Belvidere
- Unincorporated community
- Location within the state of North Carolina Belvidere (the United States)
- Coordinates: 36°16′08″N 76°32′09″W
- Country: United States
- State: North Carolina
- County: Perquimans
- Time zone: UTC-5 (Eastern (EST))
  - Summer (DST): UTC-4 (EDT)
- ZIP code: 27919
- Area code: 252

Belvidere is an unincorporated community in Perquimans County, in the Albemarle Sound region of the northeastern part of the U.S. state of North Carolina. It is located north-west of the twin towns of Hertford and Winfall at the intersection of North Carolina Highway 37, and Perry's Bridge Road on the east side of the Perquimans River. Belvidere is part of the Elizabeth City, North Carolina Micropolitan Statistical Area.

Belvidere was originally built up chiefly by Quakers.

The Belvidere, Belvidere Historic District, and Mitchell-Ward House are listed on the National Register of Historic Places.

== Notable person ==
- Wolfman Jack (Robert Weston Smith) (1938–1995), the legendary disc jockey, TV personality, and actor, moved to Belvidere and lived there until his death in 1995. His remains are buried on the property he owned with his wife, Lou.
