= Belvidere Township, Goodhue County, Minnesota =

Belvidere Township, Minnesota
- Township
- Location within the state of Minnesota Belvidere Township, Minnesota (the United States)
- Coordinates: 44°25′28″N 92°29′31″W
- Country: United States
- State: Minnesota
- County: Goodhue

Area
  - Total: 35.6 sq mi (92.2 km^{2})
  - Land: 35.6 sq mi (92.2 km^{2})
  - Water: 0 sq mi (0.0 km^{2})
- Elevation: 1,099 ft (335 m)

Population (2000)
  - Total: 458
  - Density: 13/sq mi (5/km^{2})
- Time zone: UTC-6 (Central (CST))
  - Summer (DST): UTC-5 (CDT)
- FIPS code: 27-05032
- GNIS feature ID: 0663563
- Website: https://www.belvideremn.com/

Belvidere Township is a township in Goodhue County, Minnesota, United States. The population was 458 at the 2000 census.

== History ==
Belvidere Township was organized in 1858.

== Geography ==
According to the United States Census Bureau, the township has a total area of 35.6 square miles (92 km^{2}), all land.

=== Unincorporated communities ===
==== Belvidere Mills ====
Belvidere Mills is still an existing, unincorporated community in sections 4 and 5 of Belvidere Township. A post office was located in Belvidere Mills from 1877 to 1905, as well as a station on the Chicago, Milwaukee and St Paul Railroad.

==== Thoten/Belvidere ====
A post office existed within the township from 1878 to 1883, by the name of Thoten, and briefly by the name of Belvidere. The community of Thoten/Belvidere also had a flour mill on Wells Creek.

== Demographics ==
As of the census of 2000, there were 458 people, 149 households, and 120 families residing in the township. The population density was 12.9 inhabitants per square mile (5.0/km^{2}). There were 157 housing units at an average density of 4.4 per square mile (1.7/km^{2}). The racial makeup of the township was 97.16% White, 0.44% Native American, 1.31% Asian, and 1.09% from two or more races.

There were 149 households, out of which 42.3% had children under the age of 18 living with them, 68.5% were married couples living together, 6.0% had a female householder with no husband present, and 18.8% were non-families. 15.4% of all households were made up of individuals, and 6.0% had someone living alone who was 65 years of age or older. The average household size was 3.07 and the average family size was 3.43.

In the township the population was spread out, with 34.5% under the age of 18, 6.3% from 18 to 24, 30.6% from 25 to 44, 18.8% from 45 to 64, and 9.8% who were 65 years of age or older. The median age was 33 years. For every 100 females, there were 116.0 males. For every 100 females age 18 and over, there were 112.8 males.

The median income for a household in the township was $50,972, and the median income for a family was $57,639. Males had a median income of $26,875 versus $30,250 for females. The per capita income for the township was $18,317. About 9.9% of families and 11.0% of the population were below the poverty line, including 12.5% of those under age 18 and 15.9% of those age 65 or over.
