= Belvidere Hill Historic District =

Historic district in Massachusetts, United States

- U.S. National Register of Historic Places
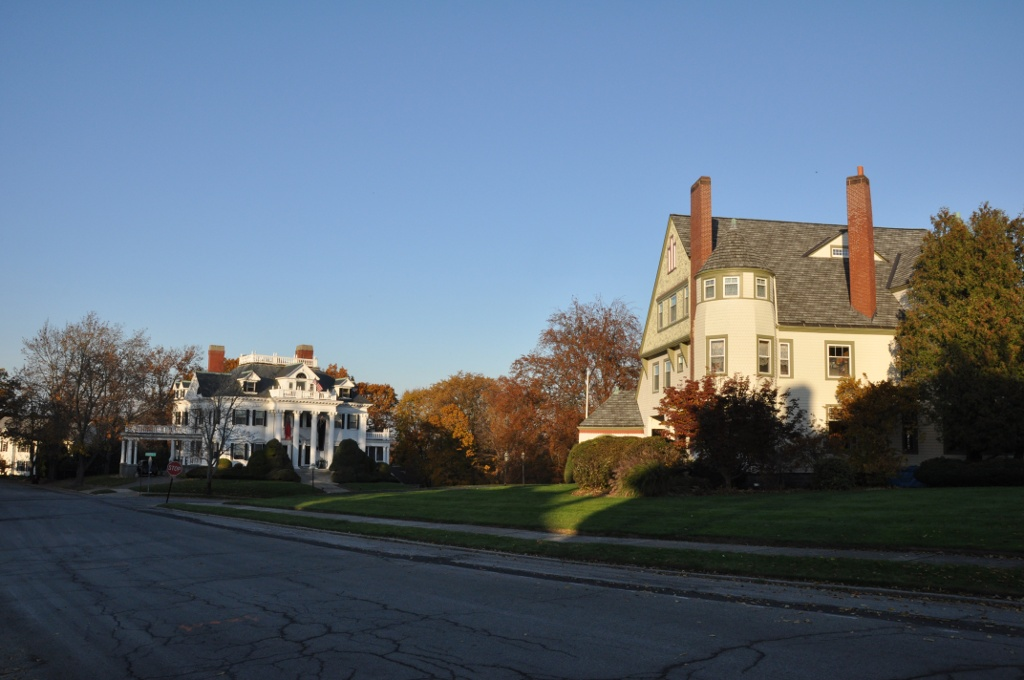
- Two contributing properties

- Location within Massachusetts Location within the United States
- Location: Lowell, Massachusetts
- Coordinates: 42°38′17″N 71°17′34″W
- Area: 38 acres (15 ha)
- Built: 1849
- Architectural style: Victorian, Colonial Revival
- NRHP reference No.: 95000656
- Added to NRHP: May 26, 1995

The Belvidere Hill Historic District encompasses a residential area on the east side of Lowell, Massachusetts known for its fine 19th-century houses. The area, roughly bounded by Wyman, Belmont, Fairview, and Nesmith Streets, was developed beginning in the 1850s, and was one of the finest neighborhoods in the city, home to many of its business and civic leaders. It was listed on the National Register of Historic Places in 1995.

== Description and history ==
Belvidere Hill is the highest point in the city of Lowell. Located on the city's east side, it is one of several glacial drumlin that characterize the city's geography east of the Concord River and south of the Merrimack River. Prior to its residential development, Belvidere Hill was farmland. In 1849, the Proprietors of Locks and Canals purchased land at the top of what was then called Lynde's Hill, and built a reservoir in order to provide water pressure to the city's industries when the power canals were drained for maintenance. Fairmount Road, built to facilitate construction of the reservoir, also became a spur to the hill's residential development. The city's businessmen and political leaders found the hill a desirable place to live, in part because it provided views away from the heavily urbanized parts of the city.

The historic district is roughly bounded by Wyman, Belmont, Fairview, and Nesmith Streets. Fairmount Street is the principal spine of the district, running between Mansur Street and Evergreen Road. It also includes portions of Belmont and Nesmith Streets, which parallel Fairmount, and all of Talbot, Fairview, and Summit Streets, which are short streets between Fairmount and Belmont. The earliest houses built in the area are generally Italianate and Second Empire in their styling, and the area's development ended around the turn of the 20th century, when Queen Anne and Colonial Revival styles were fashionable. Lot sizes are generally large (1/2 to 1 acre), and the houses often included a front drive and carriage house in the rear. The land switched hands between Billerica, then Tewksbury which broke away from Billerica, then being sold to Lowell. The former Tewksbury lands can be seen in the lands Lowell has on the Merrimack River and Concord River on the east side.

== See also ==
- National Register of Historic Places listings in Lowell, Massachusetts
