= Belvidere Historic District (Hertford, North Carolina) =

Historic district in North Carolina, United States

- U.S. National Register of Historic Places
- U.S. Historic district
- Location within North Carolina Location within the United States
- Location: Roughly bounded by the Perquinmans R., NC 37, NC 1200, and NC 1213 surrounding Belvidere, near Hertford, North Carolina
- Coordinates: 36°16′08″N 76°32′17″W
- Area: 324 acres (131 ha)
- Built: 1833
- Architectural style: Federal, Greek Revival, et al.
- NRHP reference No.: 99000600
- Added to NRHP: June 4, 1999

Belvidere Historic District is a national historic district located at Belvidere, near Hertford, Perquimans County, North Carolina, United States. The district encompasses 68 contributing buildings, 3 contributing sites, and 6 contributing structures in the rural agricultural area around the village of Belvidere. The district developed between about 1800 and 1949, and includes notable examples of Federal and Greek Revival style architecture. Notable buildings include the Joseph Smith House, Rufus White House, Edwin S. White Farm, Fernando C. White Mill Complex, John J. Chappell, Jr. Farm, and Murray and Fernando C. White Farm.

The house was added to the National Register of Historic Places in 1998.
