= 2025 NCAA Division I baseball rankings =

2025 NCAA Division I baseball season
- Duration: February 14, 2025 – June 22, 2025
- Number of teams: 300
- Preseason No. 1: Texas A&M

Tournament
- Duration: May 30–June 23, 2025
- Most conference bids: 13 – SEC

College World Series
- Champions: LSU (8th title)
- Runners-up: Coastal Carolina (2nd CWS Appearance)
- Winning coach: Jay Johnson (2nd title)
- MOP: Kade Anderson (LSU)

Seasons
- ← 2024 2026 →

The following human polls make up the 2025 NCAA Division I men's baseball rankings. The USA Today Coaches Poll is voted on by a panel of 31 Division I baseball coaches. The Baseball America poll is voted on by staff members of the Baseball America magazine. These polls, along with the D1 Baseball poll and the Perfect Game poll rank the top 25 teams nationally. The National Collegiate Baseball Writers Association rank the top 30 teams nationally.

== Legend ==
| | Increase in ranking |
| | Decrease in ranking |
| | Not ranked previous week |
| Italics | Number of first place votes |
| (#-#) | Win-loss record |
| т | Tied with team above or below also with this symbol |

== USA Today Coaches Poll ==
| | Preseason Feb 3 | Week 2 Feb 24 | Week 3 Mar 3 | Week 4 Mar 10 | Week 5 Mar 17 | Week 6 Mar 24 | Week 7 Mar 31 | Week 8 Apr 7 | Week 9 Apr 14 | Week 10 Apr 21 | Week 11 Apr 28 | Week 12 May 5 | Week 13 May 12 | Week 14 May 19 | Week 15 May 26 | Final Jun 23 | |
|---|---|---|---|---|---|---|---|---|---|---|---|---|---|---|---|---|---|
| 1. | Texas A&M | Tennessee (7–0) (18) | Tennessee (11–0) (27) | Tennessee (16–0) (25) | Tennessee (20–0) (30) | Tennessee (22–2) (23) | Tennessee (26–2) (29) | Arkansas (30–3) (26) | Texas (29–5) (23) | Texas (33–5) (29) | Texas (37–5) (30) | Texas (38–8) (12) | LSU (40–12) (19) | LSU (41–13) (22) | North Carolina (42–12) (6) | LSU (53–15) (30) | 1. |
| 2. | Tennessee | Texas A&M (5–1) (11) | LSU (11–1) (3) | LSU (16–1) (3) | LSU (20–1) | Arkansas (23–2) (6) | Arkansas (26–3) | Texas (26–4) (2) | Arkansas (32–5) (5) | Clemson (35–7) | LSU (36–9) | Arkansas (40–9) (10) | Florida State (36–11) (5) | Texas (41–11) (3) | Texas (42–12) (4) | Coastal Carolina (56–13) | 2. |
| 3. | LSU | LSU (6–1) | Arkansas (10–1) | Arkansas (15–1) | Arkansas (18–2) | Georgia (24–2) (1) | Georgia (28–2) (1) | LSU (30–3) | Tennessee (31–5) (1) | Oregon State (30–7) | North Carolina (33–10) | Florida State (33–10) (5) | Texas (40–10) (1) | North Carolina (39–11) (1) | LSU (43–14) (9) | Arkansas (50–15) | 3. |
| 4. | Virginia | Arkansas (6–1) | North Carolina (12–0) | Florida State (15–0) (1) | Florida State (18–1) | Florida State (20–3) | Florida State (23–4) | Tennessee (28–4) (2) | Clemson (33–6) | Arkansas (34–7) (1) | Clemson (36–10) | LSU (38–11) | North Carolina (37–11) | Arkansas (42–12) (1) | Vanderbilt (42–16) (10) | Oregon State (48–16) | 4. |
| 5. | Arkansas | Florida State (7–0) (1) | Florida State (11–0) | Georgia (18–1) | Georgia (21–2) | Clemson (23–3) | Texas (23–3) | Clemson (30–5) | Georgia (32–6) (1) | LSU (34–7) | Arkansas (37–9) | North Carolina (35–10) (1) | Arkansas (41–11) (2) | Oregon (40–13) (1) | Arkansas (43–13) (1) | UCLA (48–18) | 5. |
| 6. | Florida State | North Carolina (6–0) | Florida (11–1) | Clemson (15–1) | Clemson (19–2) | LSU (22–3) | LSU (26–3) | Georgia (29–5) | Oregon State (26–7) | Tennessee (33–7) | Tennessee (35–9) | Georgia (39–11) (2) | Auburn (36–15) (1) | Florida State (36–13) (1) | Georgia (42–15) | Louisville (42–24) | 6. |
| 7. | Oregon State | Florida (7–0) | Georgia (13–1)т | Florida (15–2) | Texas (17–1) | Texas (19–3) | Clemson (26–5) | Ole Miss (24–7) | LSU (31–6) | Florida State (29–7) | Georgia (35–11) | Oregon (33–13) | Oregon (38–13) (1) | Oregon State (40–12) | Oregon (42–14) | Arizona (44–21) | 7. |
| 8. | North Carolina | Georgia (8–1) | Clemson (10–1)т | North Carolina (14–2) | Oregon State (15–3) | Oregon State (18–4) | Alabama (25–4) | Florida State (25–6) | Florida State (28–7) | North Carolina (31–9) | Florida State (31–9) | Auburn (33–15) | Georgia (40–13) | Georgia (41–14) | Florida State (38–14) | North Carolina (46–15) | 8. |
| 9. | Georgia | Clemson (6–1) | Texas (9–1) | Texas (13–1) | Oregon (17–4)т | Oklahoma (20–3) | Oklahoma (22–5) | Oregon State (22–7) | Auburn (26–10) | Georgia (33–9) | UC Irvine (32–9) | Clemson (37–12) | Vanderbilt (36–16) (1) | Vanderbilt (38–16) | Oregon State (41–12) | Florida State (42–16) | 9. |
| 10. | Florida | Oregon State (5–2) | Oregon State (7–3) | Oregon (14–2) | Oklahoma (17–2)т | Oregon (19–5) | Ole Miss (21–6) | Alabama (27–6) | North Carolina (28–8) | Vanderbilt (30–10) | Oregon (30–12) | Vanderbilt (34–14) | Oregon State (37–12) | Auburn (37–17) | Auburn (38–18) | Tennessee (46–19) | 10. |
| 11. | Clemson | Virginia (3–3) | Virginia (7–3) | Oregon State (10–3) | Florida (16–5) | Alabama (22–3) | Oregon State (20–6) | UCLA (25–6) | Ole Miss (27–9) | Auburn (27–13) | Auburn (30–14) | Oregon State (34–12) | Coastal Carolina (41–11) | Coastal Carolina (43–11) | Coastal Carolina (48–11) | Murray State (44–17) | 11. |
| 12. | Duke | Vanderbilt (7–1) | Oklahoma (11–0) | Oklahoma (14–1) | Alabama (20–1) | Auburn (19–5) | Oregon (20–7) | Auburn (22–10) | UCLA (28–7) | UC Irvine (28–9) | Oregon State (32–10) | Tennessee (37–11) | UC Irvine (38–11) | Clemson (40–15) | Clemson (44–16) | Texas (44–14) | 12. |
| 13. | Texas | Wake Forest (7–1) | Oregon (10–2) | Wake Forest (14–3) | Wake Forest (18–3) | Vanderbilt (19–5) | UC Irvine (21–5) | North Carolina (24–8) | Georgia Tech (29–7) | Oklahoma (29–10) | West Virginia (37–5) | West Virginia (39–7) | Clemson (38–15) | UCLA (38–15) | UCLA (42–16) | Auburn (41–20) | 13. |
| 14. | Oregon | Texas (5–1) | Texas A&M (6–4) | Vanderbilt (13–3) | Stanford (15–3) | Wake Forest (19–6) | North Carolina (21–7) | Vanderbilt (24–8) | UC Irvine (25–8) | West Virginia (34–4) | UCLA (32–11) | Coastal Carolina (37–11) | Tennessee (39–13) | Southern Miss (40–13) | Southern Miss (44–14) | Vanderbilt (43–18) | 14. |
| 15. | Wake Forest | Oregon (6–2) | UC Santa Barbara (9–2) | Ole Miss (14–1) | North Carolina (16–4) | Ole Miss (18–5) | UCLA (22–5) | UC Irvine (23–7) | Alabama (29–8) | UCLA (29–10) | Vanderbilt (31–13) | UC Irvine (34–11) | UCLA (37–14) | Florida (36–19) | Ole Miss (40–19) | Georgia (43–17) | 15. |
| 16. | NC State | Mississippi State (6–1) | Wake Forest (10–3) | Alabama (16–1) | Auburn (16–4) | Southern Miss (18–6) | Southern Miss (20–8) | Louisville (24–7) | Oklahoma (25–10) | Oregon (27–11) | Alabama (35–10) | Oklahoma (32–14) | Alabama (39–13) | Georgia Tech (38–16) | Tennessee (43–16) | Oregon (42–16) | 16. |
| 17. | Oklahoma State | Oklahoma (6–0) | Alabama (12–0) | UC Santa Barbara (13–2) | Dallas Baptist (14–5) | Dallas Baptist (16–7) | Auburn (20–8) | Oregon (22–9) | Vanderbilt (26–10) | Alabama (31–10) | NC State (30–12) | UCLA (34–13) | West Virginia (40–10) | Tennessee (41–14) | Georgia Tech (40–17) | West Virginia (44–16) | 17. |
| 18. | Vanderbilt | Dallas Baptist (6–1) | Vanderbilt (9–3) | Stanford (12–3) | Ole Miss (15–4) | North Carolina (18–6) | Louisville (20–7) | Georgia Tech (26–6) | Oregon (24–10) | Ole Miss (28–12) | Ole Miss (31–13) | Troy (34–14) | NC State (32–16) | UC Irvine (39–13) | Florida (38–20) | Ole Miss (43–21) | 18. |
| 19. | Mississippi State | UC Santa Barbara (6–1) | Ole Miss (10–1) | Dallas Baptist (11–4) | Vanderbilt (15–5) | Louisville (18–5) | Dallas Baptist (18–9) | Oklahoma (23–8) | Louisville (26–9) | Arizona (28–11) | Coastal Carolina (33–11) | NC State (30–15) | Southern Miss (38–13) | Dallas Baptist (37–14) | UC Irvine (41–15) | Southern Miss (47–16) | 19. |
| 20. | Arizona | Alabama (8–0) | Auburn (11–1) | Virginia (9–5) | Louisville (16–3) | Arizona (18–5) | Vanderbilt (20–8) | Wake Forest (23–10) | West Virginia (30–4) | Coastal Carolina (30–10) | Louisville (30–13) | Alabama (36–12) | Troy (37–16) | Ole Miss (37–17) | Alabama (41–16) | Clemson (45–18) | 20. |
| 21. | Dallas Baptist | Duke (4–3) | Troy (11–1) | Texas A&M (9–6) | UC Santa Barbara (15–4) | UC Irvine (17–5) | Troy (21–8) | Troy (24–9) | Coastal Carolina (27–9) | Louisville (28–11) | Oklahoma (30–13) | Southern Miss (35–13) | Florida (35–18) | Alabama (40–14) | Northeastern (48–9) | Duke (41–21) | 21. |
| 22. | UC Santa Barbara | TCU (5–2) | Southern Miss (9–3) | Troy (13–3) | Virginia (12–6) | Stanford (15–6) | Georgia Tech (22–6) | Kansas (27–6) | Arizona (25–10) | Georgia Tech (29–11) | Troy (31–13) | Ole Miss (33–15) | Dallas Baptist (36–13) | Northeastern (45–9) | Dallas Baptist (40–16) | UTSA (47–15) | 22. |
| 23. | TCU | Southern Miss (7–1) | Dallas Baptist (8–3) | Auburn (13–3) | Southern Miss (14–6) | Florida (18–8) | Wake Forest (20–9) | West Virginia (27–4) | Troy (26–11)т | Troy (28–12) | Southern Miss (31–13) | Arizona (33–14) | Louisville (34–17) | West Virginia (40–12) | Kansas (43–15) | UC Irvine (43–17) | 23. |
| 24. | Kentucky | Troy (6–1) | West Virginia (11–0) | West Virginia (14–1) | West Virginia (16–1) | Troy (18–6) | Coastal Carolina (20–8) | Southern Miss (22–10) | TCU (28–9)т | Southern Miss (27–13) | Arizona (30–13) | Louisville (32–15) | Duke (35–16) | NC State (33–17) | West Virginia (41–14) | Miami (FL) (35–27) | 24. |
| 25. | Troyт; Oklahomaт | Oklahoma State (2–3) | UC Irvine (8–3) | Southern Miss (11–5) | Coastal Carolina (15–5) | Georgia Tech (20–4) | West Virginia (22–4) | Coastal Carolina (23–9) | Western Kentucky (31–5) | NC State (27–12) | Kansas (35–10) | Dallas Baptist (33–13) | Ole Miss (34–17) | Kansas (41–14) | TCU (39–18) | Georgia Tech (41–19) | 25. |
| | Preseason Feb 3 | Week 2 Feb 24 | Week 3 Mar 3 | Week 4 Mar 10 | Week 5 Mar 17 | Week 6 Mar 24 | Week 7 Mar 31 | Week 8 Apr 7 | Week 9 Apr 14 | Week 10 Apr 21 | Week 11 Apr 28 | Week 12 May 5 | Week 13 May 12 | Week 14 May 19 | Week 15 May 26 | Final Jun 23 | |
| | | Dropped: No. 16 NC State; No. 20 Arizona; No. 24 Kentucky | Dropped: No. 16 Mississippi State; No. 21 Duke; No. 22 TCU; No. 25 Oklahoma State | Dropped: No. 25 UC Irvine | Dropped: No. 21 Texas A&M; No. 22 Troy | Dropped: No. 21 UC Santa Barbara; No. 22 Virginia; No. 24 West Virginia; No. 25 Coastal Carolina | Dropped: No. 20 Arizona; No. 22 Stanford; No. 23 Florida | Dropped: No. 19 Dallas Baptist | Dropped: No. 20 Wake Forest; No. 22 Kansas; No. 24 Southern Miss | Dropped: No. 23т TCU; No. 25 Western Kentucky | Dropped: No. 22 Georgia Tech | Dropped: No. 25 Kansas | Dropped: No. 16 Oklahoma; No. 23 Arizona | Dropped: No. 20 Troy; No. 23 Louisville; No. 24 Duke | Dropped: No. 24 NC State | Dropped: No. 18 Florida; No. 20 Alabama; No. 21 Northeastern; No. 22 Dallas Baptist; No. 23 Kansas; No. 25 TCU | |

== Baseball America ==
| | Preseason Jan 27 | Week 1 Feb 17 | Week 2 Feb 24 | Week 3 Mar 3 | Week 4 Mar 10 | Week 5 Mar 17 | Week 6 Mar 24 | Week 7 Mar 31 | Week 8 Apr 7 | Week 9 Apr 14 | Week 10 Apr 21 | Week 11 Apr 28 | Week 12 May 5 | Week 13 May 12 | Week 14 May 19 | Final Jun 23 | |
|---|---|---|---|---|---|---|---|---|---|---|---|---|---|---|---|---|---|
| 1. | Texas A&M | Texas A&M (3–0) | Texas A&M (5–1) | Tennessee (11–0) | Tennessee (16–0) | Tennessee (20–0) | Tennessee (22–2) | Tennessee (26–2) | Arkansas (30–3) | Texas (29–5) | Texas (33–5) | Texas (37–5) | Georgia (39–11) | LSU (40–12) | LSU (42–13) | LSU (53–15) | 1. |
| 2. | LSU | LSU (3–0) | Tennessee (7–0) | LSU (11–1) | LSU (16–1) | LSU (20–1) | Arkansas (23–2) | Arkansas (26–3) | Texas (26–4) | Tennessee (31–5) | Clemson (35–7) | LSU (36–9) | Texas (38–8) | Auburn (36–15) | North Carolina (39–12) | Coastal Carolina (56–13) | 2. |
| 3. | Tennessee | Tennessee (3–0) | LSU (6–1) | Arkansas (10–1) | Arkansas (15–1) | Arkansas (18–2) | Texas (19–3) | Texas (23–3) | LSU (30–3) | Georgia (32–6) | North Carolina (31–9) | North Carolina (33–10) | Arkansas (40–9) | North Carolina (37–11) | Georgia (42–14) | Arkansas (47–15) | 3. |
| 4. | Arkansas | Arkansas (3–0) | Arkansas (6–1) | Florida State (11–0) | Florida State (15–0) | Florida State (18–1) | Georgia (24–2) | Georgia (28–2) | Tennessee (28–4) | Arkansas (32–5) | LSU (34–7) | Georgia (35–11) | North Carolina (35–10) | Georgia (40–13) | Arkansas (43–12) | Louisville (42–24) | 4. |
| 5. | Virginia | Florida State (3–0) | Florida State (7–0) | Clemson (10–1) | Clemson (15–1) | Texas (17–1) | LSU (22–3) | LSU (26–3) | Clemson (30–5) | North Carolina (28–8) | Tennessee (33–7) | Auburn (30–14) | Auburn (33–15) | Florida State (36–11) | Texas (42–11) | Oregon State (48–17–1) | 5. |
| 6. | Florida State | Florida (3–0) | Florida (7–0) | Florida (11–1) | Florida (15–2) | Georgia (21–2) | Florida State (20–3) | Florida State (23–4) | Georgia (29–5) | Clemson (33–6) | Oregon State (30–7) | Clemson (36–10) | LSU (38–11) | Texas (40–10) | Oregon (41–13) | UCLA (48–18) | 6. |
| 7. | Florida | Virginia (2–1) | Clemson (6–1) | North Carolina (12–0) | Georgia (18–1) | Clemson (19–2) | Clemson (23–3) | Clemson (26–5) | Ole Miss (24–7) | Auburn (26–10) | Arkansas (34–7) | Tennessee (35–9) | Florida State (33–10) | Arkansas (41–11) | Auburn (38–17) | Arizona (44–21) | 7. |
| 8. | Clemson | Clemson (2–1) | Virginia (3–3) | Virginia (7–3) | Oklahoma (14–1) | Florida (16–5) | Oklahoma (20–3) | Alabama (25–4) | North Carolina (24–8) | LSU (31–6) | Vanderbilt (30–10) | West Virginia (37–5) | Coastal Carolina (37–11) | Coastal Carolina (41–11) | Coastal Carolina (44–11) | Murray State (44–17) | 8. |
| 9. | Oregon State | Oregon State (3–0) | North Carolina (6–0) | Georgia (13–1) | Texas (13–1) | Oklahoma (17–2) | Oregon State (18–4) | Oklahoma (22–5) | Auburn (22–10) | Oregon State (26–7) | Georgia (33–8) | UC Irvine (32–9) | West Virginia (39–7) | Oregon (38–13) | Florida State (37–13) | North Carolina (46–15) | 9. |
| 10. | Duke | North Carolina (3–0) | Georgia (8–1) | Oklahoma (11–0) | North Carolina (14–2) | Alabama (20–1) | Alabama (22–3) | Ole Miss (21–6) | Oregon State (22–7) | Florida State (28–7) | Florida State (29–7) | Arkansas (37–9) | Oregon (33–13) | Vanderbilt (36–16) | Vanderbilt (39–16) | Auburn (41–20) | 10. |
| 11. | Georgia | Georgia (3–1) | Oregon State (5–2) | Texas A&M (6–4) | Oregon State (10–3) | Oregon State (15–3) | Oregon (19–5) | North Carolina (21–7) | Louisville (24–7) | Ole Miss (27–9) | Oklahoma (29–10) | Coastal Carolina (33–11) | Vanderbilt (34–14) | Oregon State (37–12–1) | Oregon State (41–12–1) | Florida State (42–16) | 11. |
| 12. | North Carolina | Texas (2–1) | Texas (5–1) | Texas (9–1) | Oregon (14–2) | Wake Forest (18–3) | Auburn (19–5) | Oregon State (20–6) | Wake Forest (23–10) | Oklahoma (25–10) | Auburn (27–13) | Oregon (30–12) | Clemson (37–12) | UC Irvine (38–11) | Florida (37–19) | Tennessee (46–19) | 12. |
| 13. | Oklahoma State | Vanderbilt (2–1) | Vanderbilt (7–1) | Oregon State (7–3) | Wake Forest (14–3) | Oregon (17–4) | Wake Forest (19–6) | UC Irvine (21–5) | Florida State (25–6) | Georgia Tech (29–7) | UC Irvine (28–9) | Ole Miss (31–13) | Tennessee (37–11) | Florida (35–18) | Dallas Baptist (38–14) | West Virginia (44–16) | 13. |
| 14. | Texas | NC State (3–0) | Wake Forest (7–1) | Oklahoma State (6–4) | Vanderbilt (13–3) | Stanford (15–3) | Vanderbilt (19–5) | Louisville (20–7) | Alabama (27–6) | UCLA (28–7) | West Virginia (34–4) | Vanderbilt (31–13) | Troy (34–14) | Troy (37–16) | Clemson (41–15) | Duke (41–21) | 14. |
| 15. | Vanderbilt | Wake Forest (4–0) | Mississippi State (6–1) | Oregon (10–2) | Ole Miss (14–1) | Louisville (16–3) | Ole Miss (18–5) | Auburn (20–8) | Vanderbilt (24–8) | TCU (28–9) | Troy (28–12) | Troy (31–13) | Oregon State (34–12) | Dallas Baptist (36–13) | UCLA (39–15) | UTSA (47–15) | 15. |
| 16. | NC State | Mississippi State (3–0) | Oklahoma State (2–3) | Wake Forest (10–3) | Alabama (16–1) | North Carolina (16–4) | Arizona (18–5) | Vanderbilt (20–8) | Oklahoma (23–8) | UC Irvine (25–8) | Coastal Carolina (30–10) | Oregon State (32–10) | Oklahoma (32–14) | Alabama (39–13) | Ole Miss (34–17) | Miami (FL) (35–27) | 16. |
| 17. | Wake Forest | Oklahoma State (1–2) | Duke (4–3) | Vanderbilt (9–3) | Stanford (12–3) | Auburn (16–4) | UC Irvine (17–5) | UCLA (22–5) | UCLA (25–6) | Louisville (26–9) | Western Kentucky (33–7) | Louisville (30–13) | UC Irvine (34–11) | Clemson (38–15) | Southern Miss (41–13) | Vanderbilt (43–18) | 17. |
| 18. | Mississippi State | Duke (1–2) | Dallas Baptist (6–1) | UC Irvine (8–3) | UC Irvine (11–4) | Vanderbilt (15–5) | North Carolina (18–6) | Wake Forest (20–9) | UC Irvine (23–7) | Troy (26–11) | UCLA (29–10) | NC State (30–12) | Ole Miss (33–15) | Tennessee (39–13) | Alabama (40–15) | Texas (44–14) | 18. |
| 19. | Oregon | Oregon (3–1) | Oregon (6–2) | Ole Miss (10–1) | Virginia (9–5) | Ole Miss (15–4) | Florida (18–8) | Dallas Baptist (18–9) | Kansas (27–6) | Vanderbilt (26–10) | Louisville (28–11) | Florida State (31–9) | Louisville (32–15) | West Virginia (40–10) | Georgia Tech (39–16) | Ole Miss (43–21) | 19. |
| 20. | Kentucky | Dallas Baptist (3–0) | UC Irvine (4–3) | Alabama (12–0) | Dallas Baptist (11–4) | UC Irvine (14–5) | Louisville (18–5) | Troy (21–8) | Georgia Tech (26–6) | Western Kentucky (31–5) | Oregon (27–11) | UCLA (32–11) | Dallas Baptist (33–13) | UCLA (37–14) | UTSA (42–11) | Georgia (43–17) | 20. |
| 21. | Dallas Baptist | UC Irvine (2–1) | UC Santa Barbara (6–1) | Dallas Baptist (8–3) | Texas A&M (9–6) | Dallas Baptist (14–5) | Dallas Baptist (16–7) | Oregon (20–7) | Troy (24–9) | Alabama (29–8) | Arizona (28–11) | Oklahoma (30–13) | NC State (30–15) | NC State (32–16) | Kansas (42–14) | Southern Miss (47–16) | 21. |
| 22. | Arizona | UC Santa Barbara (3–0) | NC State (3–4) | Mississippi State (7–4) | Mississippi State (11–4) | Virginia (12–6) | Stanford (15–6) | Arizona (20–7) | Arizona (22–9) | West Virginia (30–4) | Ole Miss (28–12) | TCU (31–13) | Florida (33–16) | Ole Miss (34–17) | UC Irvine (39–13) | Oregon (42–16) | 22. |
| 23. | UC Santa Barbara | Kentucky (1–1) | Kentucky (4–1) | Kentucky (9–1) | Kentucky (12–2) | Arizona (15–4) | Southern Miss (18–6) | Kansas (23–6) | Oregon (22–9) | Arizona (25–10) | TCU (29–12) | Alabama (35–10) | Arizona (33–14) | Louisville (34–17) | Tennessee (41–15) | Florida (39–22) | 23. |
| 24. | UC Irvine | TCU (3–0) | TCU (5–2) | Southern Miss (9–3) | UC Santa Barbara (13–2) | Kentucky (14–4) | Troy (18–6) | Southern Miss (20–8) | TCU (25–8) | Coastal Carolina (27–9) | Alabama (31–10) | Kansas (35–10) | UCLA (34–13) | Southern Miss (38–13) | Northeastern (45–9) | Clemson (45–18) | 24. |
| 25. | Indiana | Michigan (3–0) | Alabama (8–0) | UC Santa Barbara (9–2) | Louisville (12–2) | West Virginia (16–1) | UCLA (18–5) | Virginia Tech (20–8) | Western Kentucky (27–5) | Oregon (24–10) | Georgia Tech (29–11) | Dallas Baptist (30–13) | Alabama (36–12) | UTSA (39–11) | Troy (37–19) | Georgia Tech (41–19) | 25. |
| | Preseason Jan 27 | Week 1 Feb 17 | Week 2 Feb 24 | Week 3 Mar 3 | Week 4 Mar 10 | Week 5 Mar 17 | Week 6 Mar 24 | Week 7 Mar 31 | Week 8 Apr 7 | Week 9 Apr 14 | Week 10 Apr 21 | Week 11 Apr 28 | Week 12 May 5 | Week 13 May 12 | Week 14 May 19 | Final Jun 23 | |
| | | Dropped: No. 22 Arizona; No. 25 Indiana | Dropped: No. 25 Michigan | Dropped: No. 17 Duke; No. 22 NC State; No. 24 TCU | Dropped: No. 14 Oklahoma State; No. 24 Southern Miss | Dropped: No. 21 Texas A&M; No. 22 Mississippi State; No. 24 UC Santa Barbara | Dropped: No. 22 Virginia; No. 24 Kentucky; No. 25 West Virginia | Dropped: No. 19 Florida; No. 22 Stanford | Dropped: No. 19 Dallas Baptist; No. 24 Southern Miss; No. 25 Virginia Tech | Dropped: No. 12 Wake Forest; No. 19 Kansas | None | Dropped: No. 17 Western Kentucky; No. 21 Arizona; No. 25 Georgia Tech | Dropped: No. 22 TCU; No. 24 Kansas | Dropped: No. 16 Oklahoma; No. 23 Arizona | Dropped: No. 19 West Virginia; No. 21 NC State; No. 23 Louisville | Dropped: No. 13 Dallas Baptist; No. 18 Alabama; No. 21 Kansas; No. 22 UC Irvine; No. 24 Northeastern; No. 25 Troy | |

== Perfect Game ==
| | Preseason Jan 6 | Week 1 Feb 17 | Week 2 Feb 24 | Week 3 Mar 3 | Week 4 Mar 10 | Week 5 Mar 17 | Week 6 Mar 24 | Week 7 Mar 31 | Week 8 Apr 7 | Week 9 Apr 14 | Week 10 Apr 21 | Week 11 Apr 28 | Week 12 May 5 | Week 13 May 12 | Week 14 May 19 | Final Jun 23 | |
|---|---|---|---|---|---|---|---|---|---|---|---|---|---|---|---|---|---|
| 1. | Texas A&M | Texas A&M (3–0) | Texas A&M (5–1) | Tennessee (11–0) | Tennessee (16–0) | Tennessee (20–0) | Tennessee (22–2) | Tennessee (26–2) | Arkansas (30–3) | Texas (29–5) | Texas (33–5) | Texas (37–5) | Georgia (39–11) | LSU (40–12) | LSU (42–13) | LSU (53–15) | 1. |
| 2. | LSU | LSU (3–0) | LSU (6–1) | LSU (10–1) | LSU (16–1) | LSU (20–1) | Georgia (24–2) | Georgia (28–2) | Texas (26–4) | Clemson (33–6) | Clemson (35–7) | LSU (36–9) | Arkansas (40–9) | Auburn (36–15) | Oregon (41–13) | Coastal Carolina (56–13) | 2. |
| 3. | Virginia | Virginia (2–1) | Georgia (8–1) | Georgia (13–1) | Georgia (18–1) | Georgia (21–2) | Clemson (23–3) | Arkansas (26–3) | Clemson (30–5) | Georgia (32–6) | LSU (34–7) | Georgia (35–11) | Texas (38–8) | Oregon (38–13) | North Carolina (39–12) | Arkansas (50–15) | 3. |
| 4. | Georgia | Georgia (3–1) | Tennessee (7–0) | Clemson (10–1) | Clemson (15–1) | Clemson (19–2) | Arkansas (23–2) | Clemson (26–5) | LSU (30–3) | Arkansas (32–5) | Oregon State (30–7) | West Virginia (37–5) | LSU (38–11) | Georgia (40–13) | Georgia (42–14) | Louisville (42–24) | 4. |
| 5. | Tennessee | Tennessee (3–0) | Florida State (7–0) | Florida State (11–0) | Florida State (15–0) | Florida State (18–1) | Texas (19–3) | Texas (23–3) | Tennessee (28–4) | Tennessee (31–5) | Georgia (33–9) | North Carolina (33–10) | North Carolina (35–10) | North Carolina (37–11) | Arkansas (43–12) | UCLA (48–18) | 5. |
| 6. | Florida State | Florida State (3–0) | Texas (5–1) | Texas (9–1) | Texas (13–1) | Texas (17–1) | Florida State (20–3) | Florida State (23–4) | Georgia (29–5) | Auburn (26–10) | Arkansas (34–7) | Oregon (30–12) | Oregon (33–13) | Florida State (36–11) | Texas (41–12–1) | Oregon State (48–16–1) | 6. |
| 7. | Texas | Texas (2–1) | Clemson (6–1) | North Carolina (12–0) | Florida (15–2) | Arkansas (18–2) | LSU (22–3) | LSU (26–3) | Oregon State (22–7) | Oregon State (26–7) | Tennessee (33–7) | UC Irvine (32–9) | West Virginia (39–7) | Arkansas (41–11) | Auburn (38–17) | Murray State (44–17) | 7. |
| 8. | Clemson | Clemson (2–1) | North Carolina (6–0) | Florida (11–1) | Arkansas (15–1) | Oklahoma (18–2) | Oklahoma (20–3) | Alabama (25–4) | Ole Miss (24–7) | Florida State (28–7) | Florida State (29–7) | Clemson (36–10) | Auburn (33–15) | Texas (40–10) | Oregon State (41–12–1) | Arizona (44–21) | 8. |
| 9. | Duke | Oregon State (3–0) | Virginia (3–3) | Virginia (7–3) | Oklahoma (14–1) | Oregon State (15–3) | Oregon State (18–4) | Oklahoma (22–5) | UCLA (25–6) | UCLA (28–7) | West Virginia (34–4) | Auburn (30–14) | Florida State (33–10) | Oregon State (37–12–1) | Coastal Carolina (44–11) | North Carolina (46–15) | 9. |
| 10. | Oregon State | North Carolina (3–0) | Florida (7–0) | Arkansas (10–1) | Oregon State (10–3) | Florida (16–5) | Oregon (19–5) | UCLA (22–5) | Florida State (25–6) | LSU (31–6) | North Carolina (31–9) | Oregon State (32–10) | Clemson (37–12) | Coastal Carolina (41–11) | Vanderbilt (39–16) | Florida State (42–16) | 10. |
| 11. | Florida | Florida (3–0) | Arkansas (6–1) | Texas A&M (6–4) | Oregon (14–2) | Alabama (20–1) | Auburn (19–5) | West Virginia (22–4) | West Virginia (27–4) | West Virginia (30–4) | UC Irvine (28–9) | Tennessee (35–9) | Oregon State (34–12) | Vanderbilt (36–16) | Florida State (37–13) | Auburn (41–20) | 11. |
| 12. | Arizona | Arkansas (3–0) | Oklahoma (6–0) | Oklahoma (11–0) | North Carolina (14–2) | Wake Forest (18–3) | Arizona (18–5) | UC Irvine (21–5) | Auburn (22–10) | Ole Miss (27–9) | Auburn (27–13) | Arkansas (37–9) | Coastal Carolina (37–11) | UC Irvine (38–11) | Clemson (41–15) | Tennessee (46–19) | 12. |
| 13. | Arkansas | TCU (3–0) | Oregon State (5–2) | Oregon State (7–3) | West Virginia (14–1) | West Virginia (16–1) | Vanderbilt (19–5) | Oregon State (20–6) | Alabama (27–6) | Georgia Tech (29–7) | Oregon (27–11) | Florida State (31–9) | Oklahoma (32–14) | Dallas Baptist (36–13) | Dallas Baptist (38–14) | UTSA (47–15) | 13. |
| 14. | Oregon | Oregon (3–1) | Vanderbilt (7–1) | Oregon (10–2) | Vanderbilt (13–3) | Oregon (17–4) | Alabama (22–3) | Auburn (20–8) | UC Irvine (23–7) | UC Irvine (25–8) | Coastal Carolina (30–10) | Coastal Carolina (33–11) | Vanderbilt (34–14) | West Virginia (40–10) | Florida (37–19) | West Virginia (44–16) | 14. |
| 15. | Vanderbilt | Vanderbilt (2–1) | Oregon (5–2) | Coastal Carolina (10–2) | Coastal Carolina (12–4) | Stanford (15–3) | Wake Forest (19–6) | Oregon (20–7) | Georgia Tech (26–6) | North Carolina (28–8) | Arizona (28–11) | UCLA (32–11) | UC Irvine (34–11) | Clemson (38–15) | Southern Miss (41–13) | Miami (FL) (35–27) | 15. |
| 16. | Wake Forest | Wake Forest (4–0) | Wake Forest (7–1) | West Virginia (11–0) | Texas A&M (9–6) | Coastal Carolina (15–5) | West Virginia (19–3) | Ole Miss (21–6) | Wake Forest (23–10) | TCU (28–9) | Oklahoma (29–10) | Ole Miss (31–13) | Dallas Baptist (33–13) | Alabama (39–13) | UCLA (39–15) | Duke (41–21) | 16. |
| 17. | Dallas Baptist | Dallas Baptist (3–0) | Dallas Baptist (6–1) | Vanderbilt (9–3) | Dallas Baptist (11–4) | Dallas Baptist (14–5) | Dallas Baptist (16–7) | Dallas Baptist (18–9) | Oregon (22–9) | Oregon (24–10) | UCLA (29–10) | NC State (30–12) | Tennessee (37–11) | UCLA (37–14) | UTSA (42–11) | Vanderbilt (43–18) | 17. |
| 18. | TCU | Duke (1–2) | Duke (4–3) | Dallas Baptist (8–3) | Wake Forest (14–3) | Auburn (16–4) | Troy (18–6) | Troy (21–8) | Troy (24–9) | Coastal Carolina (27–9) | Ole Miss (28–12) | Louisville (30–13) | Arizona (33–14) | UTSA (39–11) | Georgia Tech (38–16) | Texas (44–14) | 18. |
| 19. | North Carolina | Coastal Carolina (3–0) | TCU (5–2) | Wake Forest (9–3) | Arizona (11–4) | Arizona (15–4) | Georgia Tech (20–4) | Coastal Carolina (20–8) | Coastal Carolina (23–9) | Arizona (25–10) | Vanderbilt (30–10) | Alabama (35–10) | UCLA (34–13) | Tennessee (39–13) | UC Irvine (39–13) | Georgia (43–17) | 19. |
| 20. | Oklahoma | Oklahoma (3–0) | Coastal Carolina (6–2) | Auburn (11–1) | UC Santa Barbara (13–2) | Vanderbilt (15–5) | UC Irvine (17–5) | Arizona (20–7) | Arizona (22–9) | Alabama (29–8) | Dallas Baptist (28–11) | Dallas Baptist (30–13) | Ole Miss (33–15) | Florida (35–18) | Alabama (40–15) | Ole Miss (43–21) | 20. |
| 21. | West Virginia | West Virginia (3–0) | West Virginia (6–0) | Arizona (7–4) | Virginia (9–5) | Virginia (12–6) | Coastal Carolina (17–7) | Vanderbilt (20–8) | Vanderbilt (24–8) | Oklahoma (25–10) | Georgia Tech (29–11) | TCU (31–13) | UTSA (37–10) | Southern Miss (38–13) | Northeastern (45–9) | Clemson (45–18) | 21. |
| 22. | Auburn | UC Santa Barbara (3–0) | UC Santa Barbara (6–1) | UC Santa Barbara (9–2) | Alabama (16–1) | Louisville (16–3) | Florida (18–8) | Georgia Tech (22–6) | Oklahoma (23–8) | Troy (26–11) | Troy (28–12) | Troy (31–13) | Troy (34–14) | Troy (37–16) | Kansas (42–14) | Southern Miss (43–21) | 22. |
| 23. | Coastal Carolina | Stanford (3–0) | Stanford (7–0) | Alabama (12–0) | Ole Miss (14–1) | North Carolina (16–4) | UCLA (18–5) | North Carolina (21–7) | North Carolina (24–8) | Western Kentucky (31–5) | TCU (29–12) | Arizona (30–13) | Alabama (36–12) | Oklahoma (32–17) | West Virginia (40–13) | Oregon (42–16) | 23. |
| 24. | UC Santa Barbara | Arizona (0–3) | Arizona (4–3) | Troy (11–1) | Auburn (13–3) | UCLA (16–4) | Stanford (15–6) | Wake Forest (20–9) | Kansas (27–6) | Wake Forest (24–13) | Western Kentucky (33–7) | Oklahoma (30–13) | NC State (30–15) | NC State (32–16) | Tennessee (41–15) | Georgia Tech (41–19) | 24. |
| 25. | Oklahoma State | Auburn (2–1) | Auburn (7–1) | Southern Miss (9–3) | Stanford (12–3) | UCF (15–4) | North Carolina (18–6) | Arizona State (19–9) | Western Kentucky (27–5) | Cal Poly (25–9) | Alabama (31–10) | Vanderbilt (31–13) | Louisville (32–15) | Northeastern (41–9) | TCU (37–17) | UC Irvine (43–17) | 25. |
| | Preseason Jan 6 | Week 1 Feb 17 | Week 2 Feb 24 | Week 3 Mar 3 | Week 4 Mar 10 | Week 5 Mar 17 | Week 6 Mar 24 | Week 7 Mar 31 | Week 8 Apr 7 | Week 9 Apr 14 | Week 10 Apr 21 | Week 11 Apr 28 | Week 12 May 5 | Week 13 May 12 | Week 14 May 19 | Final Jun 23 | |
| | | Dropped: No. 25 Oklahoma State | Dropped: None | Dropped: No. 18 Duke; No. 19 TCU; No. 23 Stanford | Dropped: No. 24 Troy; No. 25 Southern Miss | Dropped: No. 16 Texas A&M; No. 20 UC Santa Barbara; No. 23 Ole Miss | Dropped: No. 21 Virginia; No. 22 Louisville; No. 25 UCF | Dropped: No. 22 Florida; No. 24 Stanford | Dropped: No. 17 Dallas Baptist; No. 25 Arizona State | Dropped: No. 21 Vanderbilt; No. 24 Kansas | Dropped: No. 24 Wake Forest; No. 25 Cal Poly | Dropped: No. 21 Georgia Tech; No. 24 Western Kentucky | Dropped: No. 21 TCU | Dropped: No. 18 Arizona; No. 20 Ole Miss; No. 25 Louisville | Dropped: No. 22 Troy; No. 23 Oklahoma; No. 24 NC State | Dropped: No. 13 Dallas Baptist; No. 14 Florida; No. 20 Alabama; No. 21 Northeastern; No. 22 Kansas; No. 25 TCU | |

== NCBWA ==
| | Preseason Feb 3 | Week 1 Feb 17 | Week 2 Feb 24 | Week 3 Mar 3 | Week 4 Mar 10 | Week 5 Mar 17 | Week 6 Mar 24 | Week 7 Mar 31 | Week 8 Apr 7 | Week 9 Apr 14 | Week 10 Apr 21 | Week 11 Apr 28 | Week 12 May 5 | Week 13 May 12 | Week 14 May 19 | Week 15 May 26 | Week 16 Jun 3 | Final June 23 | |
|---|---|---|---|---|---|---|---|---|---|---|---|---|---|---|---|---|---|---|---|
| 1. | Texas A&M | Texas A&M (3–0) | Texas A&M (5–1) | Tennessee (11–0) | Tennessee (16–0) | Tennessee (20–0) | Arkansas (23–2) | Tennessee (26–2) | Arkansas (30–3) | Texas (29–5) | Texas (33–5) | Texas (37–5) | Arkansas (40–9) | LSU (40–12) | LSU (42–13) | LSU (43–14) | North Carolina (45–13) | LSU (53–15) | 1. |
| 2. | Tennessee | Tennessee (3–0) | Tennessee (7–0) | Texas A&M (6–4) | LSU (16–1) | LSU (20–1) | Georgia (24–2) | Arkansas (26–3) | Texas (26–4) | Clemson (33–6) | Clemson (35–7) | Clemson (36–10) | Texas (38–8) | Texas (40–10) | Texas (42–11) | North Carolina (42–12) | LSU (46–15) | Coastal Carolina (56–13) | 2. |
| 3. | Virginia | LSU (3–0) | LSU (6–1) | North Carolina (12–0) | North Carolina (14–2) | Arkansas (18–2) | Tennessee (22–2) | Georgia (28–2) | LSU (30–3) | Tennessee (31–5) | Oregon State (30–7) | Oregon State (32–10) | LSU (38–11) | Florida State (36–11) | North Carolina (39–12) | Vanderbilt (42–16) | Arkansas (46–13) | Arkansas (50–15) | 3. |
| 4. | LSU | Arkansas (3–0) | Arkansas (6–1) | LSU (11–1) | Florida State (15–0) | Florida State (18–1) | Clemson (23–3) | Florida State (23–4) | Clemson (30–5) | Arkansas (32–5) | Tennessee (33–7) | LSU (36–9) | North Carolina (35–10) | North Carolina (37–11) | Florida State (37–13) | Texas (42–12) | Oregon State (45–13–1) | Oregon State (48–16–1) | 4. |
| 5. | Arkansas | Florida State (3–0) | North Carolina (6–0) | Florida State (11–0) | Arkansas (15–1) | Georgia (21–2) | LSU (22–3) | LSU (26–3) | Tennessee (28–4) | Georgia (32–6) | LSU (34–7) | Tennessee (35–9) | Florida State (33–10) | Arkansas (41–11) | Arkansas (43–12) | Arkansas (43–13) | Florida State (41–14) | Louisville (42–24) | 5. |
| 6. | Florida State | Oregon State (3–0) | Florida State (7–0) | Arkansas (10–1) | Florida (15–2) | Florida (16–5) | Florida State (20–3) | Texas (23–3) | Oregon State (22–7) | Oregon State (26–7) | Arkansas (34–7) | Arkansas (37–9) | Clemson (37–12) | Georgia (40–13) | Oregon (41–13) | Oregon (42–14) | Auburn (41–18) | UCLA (48–18) | 6. |
| 7. | Oregon State | North Carolina (3–0) | Florida (7–0) | Florida (11–1) | Georgia (18–1) | Clemson (19–2) | Texas (19–3) | Clemson (26–5) | Georgia (29–5) | Florida State (28–7) | Florida State (29–7) | Florida State (31–9) | Georgia (39–11) | Oregon (38–13) | Georgia (42–14) | Oregon State (41–12–1) | UCLA (45–16) | Arizona (44–21) | 7. |
| 8. | North Carolina | Clemson (2–1) | Oregon State (5–2) | Georgia (12–1) | Clemson (15–1) | North Carolina (16–4) | Oregon State (18–4) | Alabama (25–4) | Florida State (25–6) | LSU (31–6) | North Carolina (31–9) | North Carolina (33–10) | Tennessee (37–11) | Auburn (36–15) | Oregon State (41–12–1) | Florida State (38–14) | Coastal Carolina (51–11) | Murray State (43–17) | 8. |
| 9. | Clemson | Virginia (2–1) | Georgia (8–1) | Oregon State (7–3) | Oregon State (10–3) | Texas (17–1) | Oklahoma (20–3) | Oregon State (20–6) | Ole Miss (24–7) | Auburn (26–10) | Georgia (33–9) | Georgia (35–11) | Oregon State (34–12) | Clemson (38–15) | Vanderbilt (39–16) | Georgia (42–15) | Tennessee (46–17) | Florida State (42–16) | 9. |
| 10. | Florida | Florida (3–0) | Clemson (6–1) | Clemson (10–1) | Texas (13–1) | Oregon State (15–3) | Oregon (19–5) | Oklahoma (22–5) | Alabama (27–6) | North Carolina (28–8) | West Virginia (34–4) | West Virginia (37–5) | Oregon (33–13) | Oregon State (37–12–1) | Auburn (38–17) | Coastal Carolina (48–11) | UTSA (47–13) | Tennessee (46–19) | 10. |
| 11. | Duke | Oregon (3–1) | Wake Forest (7–1) | Wake Forest (10–3) | Wake Forest (14–3) | Oregon (17–4) | Alabama (22–3) | UC Irvine (21–5) | North Carolina (24–8) | UCLA (27–7) | Auburn (27–13) | Auburn (30–14) | UC Irvine (34–11) | Vanderbilt (36–16) | UC Irvine (39–13) | Clemson (44–16) | Arizona (42–18) | North Carolina (46–15) | 11. |
| 12. | Oregon | Georgia (3–1) | Oregon (6–2) | Vanderbilt (9–3) | Oregon (14–2) | Oklahoma (17–2) | Vanderbilt (19–5) | North Carolina (21–7) | UCLA (25–6) | Ole Miss (27–9) | Oklahoma (29–10) | Ole Miss (31–13) | Auburn (33–15) | Tennessee (39–13) | Coastal Carolina (44–11) | Auburn (38–18) | West Virginia (44–14) | West Virginia (44–16) | 12. |
| 13. | Georgia | NC State (3–0) | Virginia (3–3) | Virginia (7–3) | Vanderbilt (13–3) | Wake Forest (18–3) | Wake Forest (19–6) | Ole Miss (21–6) | UC Irvine (23–7) | UC Irvine (25–8) | UC Irvine (28–9) | UC Irvine (32–9) | West Virginia (39–7) | UC Irvine (38–11) | Clemson (41–15) | Southern Miss (44–14) | Murray State (41–14) | Auburn (41–20) | 13. |
| 14. | Vanderbilt | Vanderbilt (2–1) | Vanderbilt (7–1) | Oregon (10–2) | Virginia (9–5) | Vanderbilt (15–5) | North Carolina (18–6) | UCLA (22–5) | Vanderbilt (24–8) | Georgia Tech (29–7) | UCLA (29–10) | Oklahoma (30–13) | Oklahoma (32–14) | West Virginia (40–10) | Tennessee (41–15) | UCLA (42–16) | Louisville (38–21) | UTSA (47–15) | 14. |
| 15. | NC Stateт | Wake Forest (4–0) | Texas (5–1) | Texas (9–1) | Texas A&M (9–6) | UC Santa Barbara (15–4) | Southern Miss (18–6) | Oregon (20–7) | Oregon (22–9) | Alabama (29–8) | Vanderbilt (30–10) | UCLA (32–11) | Ole Miss (33–15) | Coastal Carolina (41–11) | Alabama (40–15) | Florida (38–20) | Duke (40–19) | Miami (35–27) | 15. |
| 16. | Wake Forestт | Texas (2–1) | Mississippi State (6–1) | Mississippi State (7–4) | Oklahoma (14–1) | Alabama (20–1) | Auburn (19–5) | Southern Miss (20–8) | Auburn (22–10) | Oklahoma (25–10) | Alabama (31–10) | Vanderbilt (31–13) | Vanderbilt (34–14) | Oklahoma (32–17) | UCLA (39–15) | Tennessee (43–16) | Miami (FL) (34–25) | Duke (40–21) | 16. |
| 17. | Texas | Mississippi State (3–0) | Dallas Baptist (6–1) | Dallas Baptist (8–3) | UC Santa Barbara (13–2) | Virginia (12–6) | Troy (18–6) | Vanderbilt (20–8) | Louisville (24–7) | Oregon (24–10) | Coastal Carolina (30–10) | Alabama (35–10) | UCLA (34–13) | Troy (37–16) | West Virginia (40–13) | Ole Miss (40–19) | Texas (44–14) | Texas (44–14) | 17. |
| 18. | Oklahoma State | Dallas Baptist (3–0) | UC Santa Barbara (6–1) | UC Santa Barbara (9–2) | Troy (13–3) | Troy (15–5) | Dallas Baptist (16–7) | Wake Forest (20–9) | Oklahoma (23–8) | West Virginia (30–4) | Troy (28–12) | Louisville (30–13) | Alabama (36–12) | UCLA (37–14) | Southern Miss (41–13) | Northeastern (48–9) | Vanderbilt (43–18) | Vanderbilt (43–18) | 18. |
| 19. | Mississippi State | Duke (1–2) | TCU (5–2) | Oklahoma (11–0) | Dallas Baptist (11–4) | Dallas Baptist (14–5) | Arizona (18–5) | Dallas Baptist (18–9) | Troy (24–9) | Vanderbilt (26–10) | Ole Miss (28–12) | Oregon (30–12) | Coastal Carolina (37–11) | Southern Miss (38–13) | Florida (37–19) | Alabama (41–16) | Georgia (43–17) | Georgia (43–17) | 19. |
| 20. | Dallas Baptist | UC Santa Barbara (3–0) | Troy (6–1) | Troy (11–1) | Alabama (16–1) | West Virginia (16–1) | Ole Miss (18–5) | Troy (21–8) | West Virginia (27–4) | Coastal Carolina (27–9) | Arizona (28–11) | Troy (31–13) | NC State (30–15) | Alabama (39–13) | NC State (33–18) | UC Irvine (41–15) | Oregon (42–16) | Southern Miss (47–16) | 20. |
| 21. | Arizona | TCU (3–0) | Southern Miss (7–1) | TCU (7–4) | West Virginia (14–1) | Southern Miss (14–6) | UC Irvine (17–5) | Auburn (20–8) | Georgia Tech (26–6) | Louisville (26–9) | Oregon (27–11) | Coastal Carolina (33–11) | Troy (34–14) | NC State (32–16) | Dallas Baptist (38–14) | Dallas Baptist (40–16) | Clemson (45–18) | Oregon (42–16) | 21. |
| 22. | UC Santa Barbara | Nebraska (2–1) | West Virginia (6–0) | West Virginia (11–0) | Southern Miss (12–5) | Kansas (17–3) | Louisville (18–5) | Louisville (20–7) | Kansas (27–6) | Troy (29–11) | Dallas Baptist (28–11) | Arizona (30–13) | Louisville (32–15) | Louisville (34–17) | Troy (37–19) | NC State (33–19) | Southern Miss (47–16) | Clemson (45–18) | 22. |
| 23. | TCU | Southern Miss (4–0) | Michigan State (6–1) | Alabama (12–0) | Ole Miss (14–1) | Stanford (15–4) | West Virginia (19–3) | West Virginia (22–4) | Wake Forest (23–10) | Arizona (25–10) | Kansas (31–10) | Kansas (35–10) | Southern Miss (35–13) | Dallas Baptist (36–13) | Northeastern (45–9) | West Virginia (41–14) | Ole Miss (43–21) | Ole Miss (43–21) | 23. |
| 24. | Nebraska | Troy (3–0) | NC State (4–3) | Southern Miss (9–3) | Mississippi State (11–4) | Ole Miss (15–4) | Florida (18–8) | Arizona (20–7) | Arizona (22–9) | TCU (28–9) | Southern Miss (27–13) | Southern Miss (30–13) | Arizona (33–14) | Arizona (34–17) | Georgia Tech (39–16) | Arizona (39–18) | Florida (39–22) | Florida (39–22) | 24. |
| 25. | Indiana | West Virginia (3–0) | Duke (4–3) | NC State (6–5) | Auburn (13–3) | Auburn (16–4) | UCLA (18–5) | Coastal Carolina (20–8) | Southern Miss (22–10) | Western Kentucky (31–5) | McNeese (29–7) | Dallas Baptist (30–13) | Dallas Baptist (33–13) | Florida (35–18) | Duke (36–18) | Georgia Tech (40–17) | Northeastern (49–11) | Northeastern (49–11) | 25. |
| | Preseason Feb 3 | Week 1 Feb 17 | Week 2 Feb 24 | Week 3 Mar 3 | Week 4 Mar 10 | Week 5 Mar 17 | Week 6 Mar 24 | Week 7 Mar 31 | Week 8 Apr 7 | Week 9 Apr 14 | Week 10 Apr 21 | Week 11 Apr 28 | Week 12 May 5 | Week 13 May 12 | Week 14 May 19 | Week 15 May 26 | Week 16 Jun 3 | Final June 23 | |
| | | Dropped: No. 18 Oklahoma State; No. 21 Arizona; No. 25 Indiana | Dropped: No. 22 Nebraska | Dropped: No. 23 Michigan State; No. 25 Duke | Dropped: No. 21 TCU; No. 25 NC State | Dropped: No. 15 Texas A&M; No. 24 Mississippi State | Dropped: No. 15 UC Santa Barbara; No. 17 Virginia; No. 22 Kansas; No. 23 Stanford | Dropped: No. 24 Florida | Dropped: No. 19 Dallas Baptist; No. 25 Coastal Carolina | Dropped: No. 22 Kansas; No. 23 Wake Forest; No. 25 Southern Miss | Dropped: No. 14 Georgia Tech; No. 21 Louisville; No. 24 TCU; No. 25 Western Kentucky | Dropped: No. 25 McNeese | Dropped: No. 23 Kansas | Dropped: No. 15 Ole Miss | Dropped: No. 16 Oklahoma; No. 22 Louisville; No. 24 Arizona | Dropped: No. 22 Troy; No. 25 Duke | Dropped: No. 19 Alabama; No. 20 UC Irvine; No. 21 Dallas Baptist; No. 22 NC State; No. 25 Georgia Tech | None | |

The Preseason poll ranked the top 30 teams in the nation. Teams not listed above are: 26. Kentucky; 27. Southern Miss; 28. Troy; 29. West Virginia; 30. Oklahoma

== D1 Baseball ==
| | Preseason Jan 13 | Week 1 Feb 17 | Week 2 Feb 24 | Week 3 Mar 3 | Week 4 Mar 10 | Week 5 Mar 17 | Week 6 Mar 24 | Week 7 Mar 31 | Week 8 Apr 7 | Week 9 Apr 14 | Week 10 Apr 21 | Week 11 Apr 28 | Week 12 May 5 | Week 13 May 12 | Week 14 May 19 | Week 15 May 27 | Final June 23 | |
|---|---|---|---|---|---|---|---|---|---|---|---|---|---|---|---|---|---|---|
| 1. | Texas A&M | Texas A&M (3–0) | Texas A&M (5–1) | LSU (11–1) | LSU (16–1) | Tennessee (20–0) | Tennessee (22–2) | Tennessee (26–2) | Arkansas (30–3) | Texas (29–5) | Texas (33–5) | Texas (37–5) | Texas (38–8) | LSU (40–12) | LSU (42–13) | North Carolina (42–12) | LSU (53–15) | 1. |
| 2. | Virginia | Virginia (2–1) | LSU (6–1) | Tennessee (11–0) | Tennessee (16–0) | LSU (20–1) | Arkansas (23–2) | Arkansas (26–3) | Texas (26–4) | Arkansas (32–5) | Clemson (35–7) | LSU (36–9) | Florida State (33–10) | Florida State (36–11) | Texas (42–11) | Vanderbilt (42–16) | Coastal Carolina (56–13) | 2. |
| 3. | LSU | LSU (3–0) | Tennessee (7–0) | Arkansas (10–1) | Arkansas (15–1) | Arkansas (18–2) | Georgia (24–2) | Georgia (28–2) | LSU (30–3) | Clemson (33–6) | Oregon State (30–7) | Clemson (36–10) | LSU (38–11) | Texas (40–10) | North Carolina (39–12) | LSU (43–14) | Arkansas (50–15) | 3. |
| 4. | Tennessee | Tennessee (3–0) | Arkansas (6–1) | North Carolina (12–0) | Georgia (18–1) | Georgia (21–2) | Florida State (20–3) | Florida State (23–4) | Clemson (30–5) | Tennessee (31–5) | Florida State (29–7) | North Carolina (33–10) | North Carolina (35–10) | North Carolina (37–11) | Oregon (41–13) | Texas (42–12) | Oregon State (48–16–1) | 4. |
| 5. | Arkansas | Arkansas (3–0) | North Carolina (6–0) | Georgia (13–1) | Florida State (15–0) | Florida State (18–1) | Oregon State (18–4) | Texas (23–3) | Tennessee (28–4) | Georgia (32–6) | Arkansas (34–7) | Florida State (31–9) | Oregon (33–13) | Oregon (38–13) | Arkansas (43–12) | Oregon (42–14) | UCLA (48–18) | 5. |
| 6. | North Carolina | North Carolina (3–0) | Georgia (8–1) | Florida State (11–0) | North Carolina (14–2) | Oregon State (15–3) | Clemson (23–3) | Clemson (26–5) | Ole Miss (24–7) | Oregon State (26–7) | Tennessee (33–7) | Oregon (30–12) | Georgia (39–11) | Auburn (36–15) | Florida State (37–13) | Arkansas (43–13) | Louisville (42–24) | 6. |
| 7. | Oregon State | Oregon State (3–0) | Florida State (7–0) | Florida (11–1) | Florida (15–2) | Clemson (19–2) | Texas (19–3) | LSU (26–3) | Georgia (29–5) | Florida State (28–7) | LSU (34–7) | Oregon State (32–10) | Arkansas (40–9) | Oregon State (37–12–1) | Oregon State (41–12–1) | Florida State (38–14) | Arizona (44–21) | 7. |
| 8. | Georgia | Georgia (3–1) | Florida (7–0) | Oregon State (7–3) | Oregon State (10–3) | Texas (17–1) | LSU (22–3) | Alabama (25–4) | Oregon State (22–7) | Auburn (26–10) | North Carolina (31–9) | UC Irvine (32–9) | Auburn (33–15) | Arkansas (41–11) | Auburn (38–17) | Oregon State (41–12–1) | Murray State (44–17) | 8. |
| 9. | Florida State | Florida State (3–0) | Oregon State (5–2) | Virginia (7–3) | Oregon (14–2) | Oregon (17–4) | Oklahoma (20–3) | Ole Miss (21–6) | Florida State (25–6) | LSU (31–6) | Vanderbilt (30–10) | Georgia (35–11) | Clemson (37–12) | Vanderbilt (36–16) | Vanderbilt (39–16) | Auburn (38–18) | North Carolina (46–15) | 9. |
| 10. | Florida | Florida (3–0) | Virginia (3–3) | Oregon (10–2) | Clemson (15–1) | Oklahoma (17–2) | Oregon (19–5) | Oklahoma (22–5) | UCLA (25–6) | UCLA (28–7) | Georgia (33–9) | Auburn (30–14) | Oregon State (34–12) | Georgia (40–13) | Georgia (42–14) | Georgia (42–15) | Florida State (42–16) | 10. |
| 11. | Duke | Oregon (3–1) | Oregon (6–2) | Clemson (10–1) | Texas (13–1) | Wake Forest (18–3) | Auburn (19–5) | Oregon State (20–6) | Auburn (22–10) | Ole Miss (27–9) | Auburn (27–13) | Arkansas (37–9) | Vanderbilt (34–14) | Coastal Carolina (41–11) | Coastal Carolina (44–11) | Coastal Carolina (48–11) | Auburn (41–20) | 11. |
| 12. | Oregon | NC State (3–0) | Wake Forest (7–1) | Texas (9–1) | Oklahoma (14–1) | Alabama (20–1) | Alabama (22–3) | UC Irvine (21–5) | Alabama (27–6) | North Carolina (28–8) | UC Irvine (28–9) | Tennessee (35–9) | West Virginia (39–7) | UC Irvine (38–11) | Southern Miss (41–13) | Southern Miss (44–14) | Tennessee (46–19) | 12. |
| 13. | NC State | Wake Forest (4–0) | Clemson (6–1) | Oklahoma (11–0) | Ole Miss (14–1) | Florida (16–5) | Southern Miss (18–6) | Southern Miss (20–8) | UC Irvine (23–7) | UC Irvine (25–8) | Oregon (27–11) | NC State (30–12) | UC Irvine (34–11) | NC State (32–16) | UCLA (39–15) | UCLA (42–16) | UTSA (47–15) | 13. |
| 14. | Wake Forest | Clemson (2–1) | Vanderbilt (7–1) | Texas A&M (6–4) | Wake Forest (14–3) | Stanford (15–3) | Vanderbilt (19–5) | UCLA (22–5) | Louisville (24–7) | Georgia Tech (29–7) | Oklahoma (29–10) | UCLA (32–11) | Coastal Carolina (37–11) | UCLA (37–14) | Clemson (41–15) | Clemson (44–16) | West Virginia (44–16) | 14. |
| 15. | Clemson | Vanderbilt (2–1) | Texas (5–1) | Wake Forest (10–3) | UC Santa Barbara (13–2) | Dallas Baptist (14–5) | Ole Miss (18–5) | Oregon (20–7) | Oregon (22–9) | Alabama (29–8) | UCLA (29–10) | Vanderbilt (31–13) | Tennessee (37–11) | Clemson (38–15) | Florida (37–19) | Ole Miss (40–19) | Duke (41–21) | 15. |
| 16. | Vanderbilt | Texas (2–1) | Oklahoma (6–0) | UC Santa Barbara (9–2) | Vanderbilt (13–3) | Louisville (16–3) | Wake Forest (19–6) | Auburn (20–8) | North Carolina (24–8) | Oregon (24–10) | Arizona (28–11) | West Virginia (37–5) | NC State (30–15) | West Virginia (40–10) | Georgia Tech (39–16) | Tennessee (43–16) | Miami (FL) (35–27) | 16. |
| 17. | Oklahoma State | Duke (1–2) | Duke (4–3) | Ole Miss (10–1) | Alabama (16–1) | North Carolina (16–4) | Dallas Baptist (16–7) | Dallas Baptist (18–9) | Vanderbilt (24–8) | Louisville (26–9) | West Virginia (34–4) | Louisville (30–13) | Oklahoma (32–14) | Tennessee (39–13) | Ole Miss (37–18) | Florida (38–20) | Texas (44–14) | 17. |
| 18. | Mississippi State | Mississippi State (3–0) | Mississippi State (6–1) | Vanderbilt (9–3) | Stanford (12–3) | Ole Miss (15–4) | Louisville (18–5) | Louisville (20–7) | Georgia Tech (26–6) | Oklahoma (25–10) | Alabama (31–10) | Alabama (35–10) | UCLA (34–13) | Alabama (39–13) | Dallas Baptist (38–14) | Georgia Tech (40–17) | Vanderbilt (43–18) | 18. |
| 19. | Texas | Oklahoma State (1–2) | Dallas Baptist (6–1) | Troy (11–1) | Texas A&M (9–6) | Southern Miss (14–6) | UC Irvine (17–5) | North Carolina (21–7) | Oklahoma (23–8) | Vanderbilt (26–10) | Louisville (28–11) | Coastal Carolina (33–11) | Troy (34–14) | Southern Miss (38–13) | Northeastern (45–9) | Northeastern (48–9) | Georgia (43–17) | 19. |
| 20. | Dallas Baptist | Dallas Baptist (3–0) | UC Santa Barbara (6–1) | Southern Miss (9–3) | Dallas Baptist (11–4) | Auburn (16–4) | Stanford (15–6) | Troy (21–8) | Troy (24–9) | Troy (26–11) | Troy (28–12) | Troy (31–13) | Louisville (32–15) | Duke (35–16) | UC Irvine (39–13) | Dallas Baptist (40–16) | Oregon (42–16) | 20. |
| 21. | Arizona | UC Santa Barbara (3–0) | Troy (6–1) | Dallas Baptist (8–3) | Troy (13–3) | UC Santa Barbara (15–4) | North Carolina (18–6) | Coastal Carolina (20–8) | Coastal Carolina (23–9) | Coastal Carolina (27–9) | Coastal Carolina (30–10) | Oklahoma (30–13) | Southern Miss (35–13) | Louisville (34–17) | Tennessee (41–15) | Arizona (39–18) | Ole Miss (43–21) | 21. |
| 22. | UC Santa Barbara | TCU (3–0) | Southern Miss (7–1) | Auburn (11–1) | Southern Miss (11–5) | Vanderbilt (15–5) | Troy (18–6) | Kansas State (19–8) | Kansas (27–6) | Arizona (25–10) | Southern Miss (27–13) | Southern Miss (31–13) | Arizona (33–14) | Troy (37–16) | NC State (33–18) | TCU (39–18) | Southern Miss (47–16) | 22. |
| 23. | TCU | Nebraska (2–1) | Cincinnati (4–2) | Alabama (12–0) | Virginia (9–5) | Virginia (12–6) | Arizona (18–5) | Vanderbilt (20–8) | Southern Miss (23–10) | Southern Miss (24–12) | Ole Miss (28–12) | Ole Miss (31–13) | Alabama (36–12) | Florida (35–18) | Alabama (40–15) | UC Irvine (41–15) | Clemson (45–18) | 23. |
| 24. | Nebraska | Troy (3–0) | Ole Miss (6–1) | Coastal Carolina (10–2) | Coastal Carolina (12–4) | Coastal Carolina (15–5) | UCLA (18–5) | Arizona State (19–9) | Arizona (22–9) | West Virginia (30–4) | Georgia Tech (29–11) | Arizona (30–13) | Ole Miss (33–15) | Dallas Baptist (36–13) | TCU (37–17) | Alabama (41–16) | Georgia Tech (41–19) | 24. |
| 25. | Troy | Cincinnati (2–1) | TCU (5–2) | Oklahoma State (6–4) | Auburn (13–3) | Troy (15–5) | Georgia Tech (20–4) | Georgia Tech (22–6) | Virginia Tech (22–10) | TCU (28–9) | NC State (27–12) | Kansas (35–10) | USC (32–15) | Northeastern (41–9) | Kansas (42–14) | Kansas (43–15) | UC Irvine (43–17) | 25. |
| | Preseason Jan 13 | Week 1 Feb 17 | Week 2 Feb 24 | Week 3 Mar 3 | Week 4 Mar 10 | Week 5 Mar 17 | Week 6 Mar 24 | Week 7 Mar 31 | Week 8 Apr 7 | Week 9 Apr 14 | Week 10 Apr 21 | Week 11 Apr 28 | Week 12 May 5 | Week 13 May 12 | Week 14 May 19 | Week 15 May 27 | Final June 23 | |
| | | Dropped: No. 21 Arizona | Dropped: No. 12 NC State; No. 19 Oklahoma State; No. 23 Nebraska | Dropped: No. 17 Duke; No. 18 Mississippi State; No. 23 Cincinnati; No. 25 TCU | Dropped: No. 25 Oklahoma State | Dropped: No. 19 Texas A&M | Dropped: No. 13 Florida; No. 21 UC Santa Barbara; No. 23 Virginia; No. 24 Coastal Carolina | Dropped: No. 16 Wake Forest; No. 20 Stanford; No. 23 Arizona | Dropped: No. 17 Dallas Baptist; No. 22 Kansas State; No. 24 Arizona State | Dropped: No. 22 Kansas; No. 25 Virginia Tech | Dropped: No. 25 TCU | Dropped: No. 24 Georgia Tech | Dropped: No. 25 Kansas | Dropped: No. 17 Oklahoma; No. 22 Arizona; No. 24 Ole Miss; No. 25 USC | Dropped: No. 16 West Virginia; No. 20 Duke; No. 21 Louisville; No. 22 Troy | Dropped: No. 22 NC State | Dropped: No. 17 Florida; No. 19 Northeastern; No. 20 Dallas Baptist; No. 22 TCU; No. 24 Alabama; No. 25 Kansas | |
