= CofC Baseball Stadium at Patriots Point =

Baseball venue in South Carolina, US

College of Charleston Baseball Stadium at Patriot's Point
- Interactive map of College of Charleston Baseball Stadium at Patriot's Point
- Location: Mount Pleasant, SC, USA
- Coordinates: 32.795308°N 79.902159°W
- Owner: College of Charleston
- Operator: Charleston Athletics
- Capacity: 2,000
- Surface: Natural
- Scoreboard: Electronic
- Field size: (L-R): 300, 375, 400, 375, 330 ft.

Construction
- Built: 2001
- Opened: 2001
- Renovated: 2007

Tenants
- Charleston Cougars baseball (2001-present); CAA Baseball Championship (2015-2016)

College of Charleston Baseball Stadium at Patriots Point is a baseball venue located in Mount Pleasant, South Carolina. It is home to the College of Charleston Cougars baseball team, a member of the Division I Colonial Athletic Association.

The venue is located across Charleston Harbor from the campus of the college. The field was constructed for the start of the 2001 season, adjacent to the College of Charleston soccer and softball fields. Since the ballpark opened in 2001, the Cougars have compiled a winning percentage of over .700.

== Notable History ==
After the ballpark's original opening in 2001, the facility underwent a $3 million renovation in 2007 that expanded the press box to include two radio/television booths, partially covered the seating areas, and increased the seating capacity to 2,000. The site also includes locker rooms, a club house, an athletic training facility, practice field and a 4,200 square foot indoor practice facility.

The ballpark saw its attendance record broken in 2012, when Charleston hosted then No. 10 South Carolina Gamecocks at Patriots Point.

In May 2015, the Colonial Athletic Association, of which Charleston is a member, hosted the first of two conference baseball championships at Patriots Point, the second coming in May 2016. The Patriots Point stadium is the third largest baseball facility in the CAA, behind Northeastern and UNCW.

In late May 2015, the College of Charleston announced their plans to design a new athletics facility at Patriots Point. While the main addition would be a three-story athletic building adjacent to the ballpark, the plans also include the expansion of seating down the third base line at the baseball stadium. The new athletics building, which would be down the left field line of the baseball stadium, would include a weight room and sports medicine facility, locker rooms, coaches’ offices, academic spaces and a viewing deck overlooking the baseball and soccer fields.

== See also ==
- List of NCAA Division I baseball venues
