= Monmouth Hawks baseball =

- 2026 Monmouth Hawks baseball team
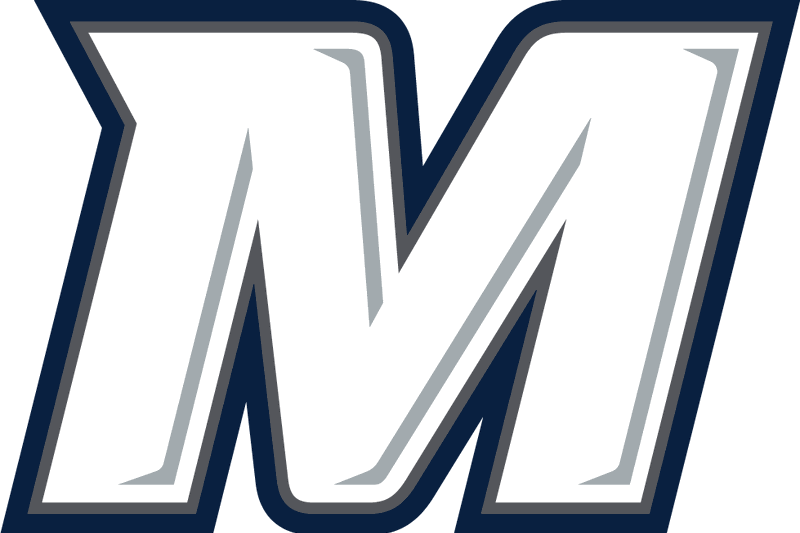
- University: Monmouth University
- Head coach: Dean Ehehalt (33rd season)
- Conference: Colonial Athletic Association
- Location: West Long Branch, New Jersey
- Home stadium: Monmouth Baseball Field
- Nickname: Hawks
- Colors: Midnight blue and white

NCAA tournament appearances
- 1998, 1999, 2007, 2009

Conference tournament champions
- NEC: 1998, 1999, 2007, 2009

Conference regular season champions
- NEC: 1989, 1991, 1996, 1998, 1999, 2001, 2002, 2008, 2011 MAAC: 2018

The Monmouth Hawks baseball team is a varsity intercollegiate athletic team of Monmouth University in West Long Branch, New Jersey, United States. The team is a member of the Colonial Athletic Association, which is part of the National Collegiate Athletic Association's Division I. The team plays its home games at Monmouth Baseball Field in West Long Branch, New Jersey. The Hawks are coached by Dean Ehehalt.

As of 2020, at least five Monmouth players, including Brad Brach and Ed Halicki, have played in Major League Baseball. Twenty players have been selected from the school in the Major League Baseball draft with the highest selection being Pat Light who was taken 37th overall in 2012.

== Monmouth in the NCAA tournament ==
Year	Record	Pct	Notes
1998	0–2	.000	South I Regional
1999	0–2	.000	College Station Regional
2007	0–2	.000	Tempe Regional
2009	0–2	.000	Oxford Regional
TOTALS	0-8	.000	

== See also ==
- List of NCAA Division I baseball programs
