= 2025 Duke Blue Devils baseball team =

American college baseball season

2025 Duke Blue Devils baseball

Athens Regional champions

Durham Super Regional, 1–2
- Conference: Atlantic Coast Conference

Ranking
- Coaches: No. 21
- D1Baseball.com: No. 15
- Record: 41–21 (17–13 ACC)
- Head coach: Chris Pollard (13th season)
- Associate head coach: Brady Kirkpatrick (3rd season)
- Assistant coaches: Derek Simmons (1st season); Brian Sakowski (2nd season)
- Hitting coach: Eric Tyler (3rd season)
- Pitching coach: John Natoli (1st season)
- Captains: Ben Miller; Andrew Yu; David Boisvert
- Alternate captain: Wallace Clark
- Home stadium: Jack Coombs Field (Capacity: 2,000)

2025 Atlantic Coast Conference baseball standings
| | Conf. | | | | Overall |
| Team | W | | L | PCT | W | | L | PCT |
|---|---|---|---|---|---|---|---|---|
| No. 18 Georgia Tech ‍†‍‍^{y} | 19 | – | 11 | .633 | 41 | – | 19 | .683 |
| No. 7 Florida State ‍‍‍^{y} | 17 | – | 10 | .630 | 41 | – | 14 | .745 |
| No. 1 North Carolina ‍‍‡‍^{y} | 18 | – | 11 | .621 | 46 | – | 13 | .780 |
| NC State ‍‍‍^{y} | 17 | – | 11 | .607 | 35 | – | 21 | .625 |
| No. 14 Clemson ‍‍‍^{y} | 18 | – | 12 | .600 | 45 | – | 18 | .714 |
| Virginia ‍‍‍ | 16 | – | 11 | .593 | 32 | – | 18 | .640 |
| Duke ‍‍‍^{y} | 17 | – | 13 | .567 | 40 | – | 19 | .678 |
| Wake Forest ‍‍‍^{y} | 16 | – | 14 | .533 | 39 | – | 22 | .639 |
| Miami (FL) ‍‍‍^{y} | 15 | – | 14 | .517 | 34 | – | 26 | .567 |
| Louisville ‍‍‍^{y} | 15 | – | 15 | .500 | 39 | – | 21 | .650 |
| Notre Dame ‍‍‍ | 14 | – | 16 | .467 | 32 | – | 21 | .604 |
| Virginia Tech ‍‍‍ | 12 | – | 18 | .400 | 31 | – | 25 | .554 |
| Stanford ‍‍‍ | 11 | – | 19 | .367 | 27 | – | 25 | .519 |
| Boston College ‍‍‍ | 11 | – | 19 | .367 | 28 | – | 29 | .491 |
| Pittsburgh ‍‍‍ | 10 | – | 20 | .333 | 28 | – | 27 | .509 |
| California ‍‍‍ | 9 | – | 21 | .300 | 24 | – | 31 | .436 |
† – Conference champion ‡ – Tournament champion y – Invited to the NCAA Tournament; As of June 6, 2025; Rankings from D1Baseball

The 2025 Duke Blue Devils baseball team represented Duke University during the 2025 NCAA Division I baseball season. The Blue Devils played their home games at Jack Coombs Field as a member of the Atlantic Coast Conference. They were led by head baseball coach Chris Pollard, in his thirteenth year as head coach.

== Previous season ==
The 2024 Duke Blue Devils team finished the 2024 NCAA Division I baseball season with a 40–20 overall record and a 16–14 record in the ACC. Duke ultimately would win the 2024 Atlantic Coast Conference baseball tournament, their first ACC tournament championship since 2021 and their second ACC title overall. Devin Obee was named the Tournament Most Outstanding Player, and catcher Alex Stone and relief pitcher, Charlie Beilenson were named to the All-Tournament Team.

With the title, Duke earned the ACC's automatic bid into the tournament, and was the second-seed in the Norman Regional. There, Duke went 1–2 in the Regional, defeating Oral Roberts, but losing to UConn and hosts, Oklahoma. Duke finished the season ranked 24th in the nation.

== Personnel ==
=== Starters ===
Lineup
| Pos. | No. | Player. | Year |
|---|---|---|---|
| C | 6 | Macon Winslow | Sophomore |
| 1B | 16 | Jake Hyde | Graduate |
| 2B | 23 | Jake Berger | Graduate |
| 3B | 34 | Ben Miller | Graduate |
| SS | 7 | Wallace Clark | Senior |
| LF | 8 | Ben Rounds | Graduate |
| CF | 29 | AJ Gracia | Sophomore |
| RF | 40 | Tyler Albright | Junior |
| DH | 3 | Andrew Yu | Senior |

Weekend Pitching Rotation
| Day | No. | Player. | Year |
|---|---|---|---|
| Friday | 5 | Kyle Johnson | Sophomore |
| Saturday | 27 | Ryan Higgins | Senior |
| Sunday | 17 | James Tallon | Junior |

=== Roster ===
2025 Duke Blue Devils baseball team
Players
Coaches

| # | Pos. | Name | B/T | Height | Weight | Year | Home town |
|---|---|---|---|---|---|---|---|
| 1 | INF | Jeff Lougee | L/R | 6 ft 0 in (1.83 m) | 185 lb (84 kg) | Fr | Mechanisburg, PA |
| 2 | LHP | Andrew Healy | L/L | 6 ft 6 in (1.98 m) | 200 lb (91 kg) | Jr | Glen Mills, PA |
| 3 | C | Andrew Yu | R/R | 6 ft 0 in (1.83 m) | 220 lb (100 kg) | Sr | Nashville, TN |
| 4 | RHP | Gabe Nard | R/R | 5 ft 11 in (1.8 m) | 190 lb (86 kg) | Jr | Shaker Heights, OH |
| 5 | RHP | Kyle Johnson | R/L | 6 ft 1 in (1.85 m) | 205 lb (93 kg) | So | Leesburg, VA |
| 6 | C | Macon Winslow | R/R | 6 ft 0 in (1.83 m) | 200 lb (91 kg) | So | Hertford, NC |
| 7 | INF | Wallace Clark | S/R | 6 ft 0 in (1.83 m) | 195 lb (88 kg) | Sr | Tulsa, OK |
| 8 | OF | Ben Rounds | L/R | 6 ft 1 in (1.85 m) | 200 lb (91 kg) | Gr | Milton, MA |
| 9 | LHP | Owen Proksch | S/L | 6 ft 3 in (1.91 m) | 225 lb (102 kg) | Jr | Southlake, TX |
| 10 | RHP | Aidan Weaver | R/R | 6 ft 5 in (1.96 m) | 230 lb (104 kg) | Jr | Jamison, PA |
| 11 | LHP | Edward Hart | L/L | 6 ft 5 in (1.96 m) | 235 lb (107 kg) | Jr | San Antonio, TX |
| 12 | LHP | Henry Zatkowski | L/L | 6 ft 2 in (1.88 m) | 190 lb (86 kg) | Fr | Clarksville, MD |
| 13 | INF | Andrew Bell | R/R | 6 ft 1 in (1.85 m) | 195 lb (88 kg) | Fr | Denver, CO |
| 15 | OF | Trevor Johnson | L/R | 6 ft 2 in (1.88 m) | 205 lb (93 kg) | Fr | Bellefonte, PA |
| 16 | UTL | Jake Hyde | L/R | 6 ft 4 in (1.93 m) | 205 lb (93 kg) | Gr | Darien, CT |
| 17 | LHP | James Tallon | L/L | 6 ft 5 in (1.96 m) | 195 lb (88 kg) | Jr | Arlington, VA |
| 18 | UTL | Sam Harris | L/L | 6 ft 5 in (1.96 m) | 220 lb (100 kg) | So | Urbandale, IA |
| 19 | LHP | Mark Hindy | L/L | 6 ft 4 in (1.93 m) | 220 lb (100 kg) | Gr | Essex Fells, NJ |
| 20 | OF | Adam Troch | L/L | 6 ft 0 in (1.83 m) | 175 lb (79 kg) | Fr | Bethesda, MD |
| 22 | INF | Nick DiPietrantonio | R/R | 6 ft 3 in (1.91 m) | 210 lb (95 kg) | Gr | Manalapan, NJ |
| 23 | INF | Jake Berger | L/R | 6 ft 3 in (1.91 m) | 195 lb (88 kg) | Gr | Boston, MA |
| 24 | LHP | Reid Easterly | L/L | 6 ft 0 in (1.83 m) | 200 lb (91 kg) | Gr | Katy, TX |
| 25 | C | Jay Slater | R/R | 6 ft 0 in (1.83 m) | 198 lb (90 kg) | Fr | Downingtown, PA |
| 26 | LHP | Kael Gahan | L/L | 6 ft 2 in (1.88 m) | 185 lb (84 kg) | Fr | Oxford, MI |
| 27 | RHP | Ryan Higgins | R/R | 6 ft 2 in (1.88 m) | 210 lb (95 kg) | Sr | New Canaan, CT |
| 29 | OF | AJ Gracia | L/L | 6 ft 3 in (1.91 m) | 195 lb (88 kg) | So | Monroe, NJ |
| 31 | RHP | Ryan Calvert | R/R | 6 ft 5 in (1.96 m) | 240 lb (109 kg) | Gr | La Plata, MD |
| 33 | UTL | Roman DiGiacomo | R/R | 6 ft 3 in (1.91 m) | 220 lb (100 kg) | Jr | Fairfield, CT |
| 34 | INF | Ben Miller | R/R | 6 ft 1 in (1.85 m) | 225 lb (102 kg) | Gr | Durham, NC |
| 35 | RHP | David Boisvert | R/R | 6 ft 5 in (1.96 m) | 215 lb (98 kg) | Sr | Charlotte, NC |
| 36 | INF | Noah Murray | R/R | 5 ft 10 in (1.78 m) | 170 lb (77 kg) | So | Crozet, VA |
| 37 | LHP | Jack Feehery | L/L | 6 ft 0 in (1.83 m) | 175 lb (79 kg) | Fr | Washington, DC |
| 38 | OF | Zach Jackson | L/R | 6 ft 1 in (1.85 m) | 170 lb (77 kg) | Fr | Smyrna, GA |
| 40 | OF | Tyler Albright | R/L | 6 ft 0 in (1.83 m) | 200 lb (91 kg) | Jr | Greensboro, NC |
| 41 | INF | Harley Goodner | R/R | 6 ft 1 in (1.85 m) | 198 lb (90 kg) | Fr | Rye, NY |
| 43 | LHP | Marcello Mastroianni | L/L | 6 ft 3 in (1.91 m) | 195 lb (88 kg) | So | Little Silver, NJ |
| 44 | RHP | Jack Hedrick | R/R | 6 ft 6 in (1.98 m) | 205 lb (93 kg) | Fr | Charlotte, NC |
| 45 | OF | Jimmy Evans | L/L | 5 ft 9 in (1.75 m) | 180 lb (82 kg) | Gr | Norwalk, CT |
| 46 | LHP | Gavin Brown | L/L | 6 ft 5 in (1.96 m) | 195 lb (88 kg) | Gr | Plano, TX |
| 47 | RHP | Collins Black | R/R | 6 ft 2 in (1.88 m) | 200 lb (91 kg) | Fr | Cary, NC |
| 49 | RHP | James Raidt | R/R | 6 ft 3 in (1.91 m) | 180 lb (82 kg) | So | Stamford, CT |
| 50 | RHP | Bryce Brannon | R/R | 6 ft 3 in (1.91 m) | 200 lb (91 kg) | Fr | Mason, OH |
| 51 | LHP | Max Stammel | L/L | 6 ft 3 in (1.91 m) | 190 lb (86 kg) | Fr | Dallas, TX |

Head coach

Chris Pollard

Assistant coach(es)

Brady Kirkpatrick
Derek Simmons

Legend

- (C) Team captain
- (S) Suspended
- (I) Ineligible
- Injured
- Current redshirt

Roster
Last update: March 8, 2025

== Offseason ==
=== Departures ===
Offseason departures
| Name | Number | Pos. | Height | Weight | Year | Hometown | Notes |
|---|---|---|---|---|---|---|---|
| Jimmy Romano | 1 | RHP | 6 ft 1 in (1.85 m) | 200 pounds (91 kg) | Junior | Roseland, NJ | Declare for 2024 MLB draft; selected 479th overall by Cincinnati Reds |
| Alex Stone | 5 | C | 6 ft 5 in (1.96 m) | 235 pounds (107 kg) | Senior | Andover, NJ | Graduated |
| Josh Allen | 8 | LHP | 6 ft 1 in (1.85 m) | 200 pounds (91 kg) | Graduate | Oviedo, FL | Graduated |
| Jonathan Santucci | 12 | LHP | 6 ft 2 in (1.88 m) | 205 pounds (93 kg) | Junior | Leominster, MA | Declare for 2024 MLB draft; selected 46th overall by New York Mets |
| Jackson Emus | 16 | RHP | 6 ft 5 in (1.96 m) | 240 pounds (110 kg) | Graduate | Clinton, MA | Graduated |
| Tim Noone | 19 | LHP | 6 ft 0 in (1.83 m) | 190 pounds (86 kg) | Graduate | Needham, MA | Graduated |
| Nick Conte | 20 | RHP | 5 ft 10 in (1.78 m) | 200 pounds (91 kg) | Senior | North Providence, RI | Declare for 2024 MLB draft; selected 227th overall by Kansas City Royals |
| Mike Miller | 21 | UTL | 6 ft 4 in (1.93 m) | 220 pounds (100 kg) | Freshman | Mendota, MN | Did not return |
| Zac Morris | 22 | INF | 5 ft 11 in (1.80 m) | 185 pounds (84 kg) | Graduate | Suffolk, VA | Graduated |
| Logan Bravo | 23 | INF | 6 ft 5 in (1.96 m) | 215 pounds (98 kg) | Graduate | Andover, MA | Graduated |
| Chad Knight | 24 | C | 6 ft 0 in (1.83 m) | 210 pounds (95 kg) | Graduate | Westport, CT | Graduated |
| Fran Oschell III | 31 | RHP | 6 ft 7 in (2.01 m) | 230 pounds (100 kg) | Junior | Phoenixville, PA | Declare for 2024 MLB draft; selected 352nd overall by Los Angeles Angels |
| Sam Yelton | 32 | OF | 6 ft 3 in (1.91 m) | 200 pounds (91 kg) | Junior | Harrisburg, NC | Did not return |
| Ben Miller | 34 | INF | 6 ft 1 in (1.85 m) | 225 pounds (102 kg) | Graduate | Durham, NC | Graduated |
| Jimmy Evans | 45 | OF | 5 ft 9 in (1.75 m) | 180 pounds (82 kg) | Graduate | Norwalk, CT | Graduated |
| Charlie Beilenson | 47 | RHP | 6 ft 0 in (1.83 m) | 215 pounds (98 kg) | Graduate | Los Angeles, CA | Declare for 2024 MLB draft; selected 154th overall by Seattle Mariners |
| Harrison Rodgers | 50 | INF | 0 ft 11 in (0.28 m) | 185 pounds (84 kg) | Graduate | San Diego, CA | Graduated |
| Ben Weaver | 51 | OF | 5 ft 11 in (1.80 m) | 185 pounds (84 kg) | Graduate | Doylestown, PA | Graduated |

==== Outgoing transfers ====
Outgoing transfers
| Name | Number | Pos. | Height | Weight | Hometown | Year | New school | Source |
|---|---|---|---|---|---|---|---|---|
| Devin Obee | 13 | OF | 6 ft 2 in (1.88 m) | 215 pounds (98 kg) | Nashville, TN | Junior | Georgia | |
| Chase Krewson | 25 | UTL | 6 ft 2 in (1.88 m) | 205 pounds (93 kg) | Bridgeville, PA | Freshman | UCF | |
| Camron Poe | 30 | LHP | 6 ft 3 in (1.91 m) | 215 pounds (98 kg) | Chesterfield, MO | Freshman | Georgetown | |

==== 2024 MLB draft ====
2024 MLB Draft class
| Round | Pick | Overall pick | Player | Position | MLB team | Source |
|---|---|---|---|---|---|---|
| 2 | 7 | 46 | Jonathan Santucci | P | New York Mets | |
| 5 | 18 | 154 | Charlie Beilenson | P | Seattle Mariners | |
| 8 | 2 | 227 | Nick Conte | P | Kansas City Royals | |
| 12 | 7 | 352 | Fran Oschell III | P | Los Angeles Angels | |
| 16 | 14 | 479 | Jimmy Romano | P | Cincinnati Reds | |

=== Acquisitions ===
==== Incoming transfers ====
Incoming transfers
| Name | Number | Pos. | Height | Weight | Hometown | Year | Previous school | Source |
|---|---|---|---|---|---|---|---|---|
| Ben Rounds | 8 | OF | 6 ft 1 in (1.85 m) | 200 pounds (91 kg) | Milton, MA | Graduate | Harvard | |
| Jake Hyde | 16 | UTL | 6 ft 4 in (1.93 m) | 205 pounds (93 kg) | Darien, CT | Graduate | Georgetown | |
| Mark Hindy | 19 | LHP | 6 ft 4 in (1.93 m) | 220 pounds (100 kg) | Essex Fells, NJ | Graduate | William & Mary | |
| Nick DiPietrantonio | 22 | LHP | 6 ft 3 in (1.91 m) | 210 pounds (95 kg) | Manalapan, NJ | Graduate | Princeton | |
| Jake Berger | 23 | INF | 6 ft 3 in (1.91 m) | 195 pounds (88 kg) | Boston, MA | Graduate | Harvard | |
| Reed Easterly | 24 | LHP | 6 ft 0 in (1.83 m) | 200 pounds (91 kg) | Katy, TX | Graduate | Yale | |
| Ryan Calvert | 31 | RHP | 6 ft 5 in (1.96 m) | 240 pounds (110 kg) | La Plata, MD | Graduate | UNCW | |
| Gavin Brown | 46 | LHP | 6 ft 5 in (1.96 m) | 195 pounds (88 kg) | Plano, TX | Graduate | Tufts | |

==== Incoming recruits ====
2025 Duke Recruits
| Name | Number | B/T | Pos. | Height | Weight | Hometown | High School | Source |
|---|---|---|---|---|---|---|---|---|
| Jeff Lougee | 1 | L/R | INF | 6 ft 0 in (1.83 m) | 185 pounds (84 kg) | Mechanicsburg, PA | Mechanisburg Area | |
| Henry Zatkowski | 12 | L/L | LHP | 6 ft 2 in (1.88 m) | 190 pounds (86 kg) | Clarksville, MD | River Hill | |
| Andrew Bell | 13 | R/R | INF | 6 ft 1 in (1.85 m) | 195 pounds (88 kg) | Denver, CO | Regis Jesuit | |
| Trevor Johnson | 15 | L/R | OF | 6 ft 2 in (1.88 m) | 205 pounds (93 kg) | Bellefonte, PA | Bellefonte Area | |
| Adam Troch | 20 | L/L | OF | 6 ft 0 in (1.83 m) | 175 pounds (79 kg) | Bethesda, MD | St. Johns College | |
| Jay Slater | 25 | R/R | C | 6 ft 0 in (1.83 m) | 198 pounds (90 kg) | Downingtown, PA | Downingtown | |
| Kael Gahan | 26 | L/L | LHP | 6 ft 2 in (1.88 m) | 185 pounds (84 kg) | Oxford, MI | Lake Orion | |
| Jack Feehery | 37 | L/L | LHP | 6 ft 0 in (1.83 m) | 175 pounds (79 kg) | Washington, DC | Gonzaga College | |
| Zach Jackson | 38 | L/R | OF | 6 ft 1 in (1.85 m) | 170 pounds (77 kg) | Smyrna, GA | Holy Innocents' Episcopal (GA) | |
| Harley Goodner | 41 | R/R | INF | 6 ft 1 in (1.85 m) | 198 pounds (90 kg) | Rye, NY | Greenwich Country | |
| Jack Hedrick | 44 | R/R | RHP | 6 ft 5 in (1.96 m) | 205 pounds (93 kg) | Charlotte, NC | Charlotte Catholic | |
| Collins Black | 47 | R/R | RHP | 6 ft 2 in (1.88 m) | 200 pounds (91 kg) | Cary, NC | Cary | |
| Bryce Brannon | 50 | R/R | RHP | 6 ft 3 in (1.91 m) | 200 pounds (91 kg) | Mason, OH | William Mason (OH) | |
| Max Stammel | 51 | L/L | :HP | 6 ft 3 in (1.91 m) | 190 pounds (86 kg) | Dallas, TX | Highland Park (TX) | |

== Preseason ==
=== Coaches poll ===
The Coaches' Preseason Poll was released on January 30, 2025. Duke was selected to finish fifth in the ACC.

ACC coaches poll
| Predicted finish | Team | Votes (1st place) |
| 1 | Virginia | 251 (13) |
| 2 | Florida State | 230 (2) |
| 3 | North Carolina | 217 |
| 4 | Clemson | 214 (1) |
| 5 | Duke | 182 |
| 6 | Wake Forest | 171 |
| 7 | NC State | 168 |
| 8 | Stanford | 143 |
| 9 | Louisville | 128 |
| 10 | Georgia Tech | 113 |
| 11 | Miami (FL) | 87 |
| 12 | Virginia Tech | 85 |
| 13 | California | 60 |
| 14 | Pitt | 52 |
| 15 | Notre Dame | 44 |
| 16 | Boston College | 31 |

== Game log ==
2025 Duke Blue Devils game log (41–21)
Regular Season: 36–18 (Home: 29–9; Away: 8–9)

February: 5–5 (Home: 5–4; Away: 0–1)
| Game | Date | TV | Rank | Opponent | Stadium | Score | Win | Loss | Save | Attendance | Overall | ACC |
|---|---|---|---|---|---|---|---|---|---|---|---|---|
| 1 | February 14 | ACCNX | No. 11 | No. 25 Cincinnati* | Jack Coombs Field; Durham, NC | **L** 3–8 | Pineiro (1–0) | **K. Johnson** (0–1) | None | 746 | 0–1 | — |
| 2 | February 15 | ACCNX | No. 11 | No. 25 Cincinnati* | Jack Coombs Field | **W** 6–5 | **Weaver** (1–0) | Barnett | None | 485 | 1–1 | — |
| 3 | February 16 | ACCNX | No. 11 | No. 25 Cincinnati* | Jack Coombs Field | **L** 5–19 | H. Johnson (1–0) | **Tallon** (0–1) | None | 659 | 1–2 | — |
| 4 | February 18 | ACCNX | No. 17 | UNCW* | Jack Coombs Field | **W** 8–4 | **Calvert** (1–0) | Smith (0–2) | None | 393 | 2–2 | — |
| 5 | February 21 | ACCNX | No. 17 | Cornell* | Jack Coombs Field | **L** 8–11 | Mayfield (1–0) | **K. Johnson** (0–2) | None | 334 | 2–3 | — |
| 6 | February 22 | ACCNX | No. 17 | Cornell* | Jack Coombs Field | **W** 16–2 | **Higgins** (1–0) | Keller (0–1) | None | 443 | 3–3 | — |
| 7 | February 23 | ACCNX | No. 17 | Cornell* | Jack Coombs Field | **W** 18–1 | **Nard** (1–0) | Ellison (0–1) | None | 431 | 4–3 | — |
| 8 | February 25 | FloSports | No. 17 | at Campbell* | Jim Perry Stadium; Buies Creek, NC | **L** 6–9 | M. Smith (1–0) | **Healy** (0–1) | Schares (1) | 875 | 4–4 | – |
| 9 | February 26 | ACCNX | No. 17 | Liberty* | Jack Coombs Field | **L** 4–12 | Swink (2–0) | **Zatkowski** (0–1) | None | 396 | 4–5 | – |
| 10 | February 28 | ACCNX | No. 17 | Northwestern* | Jack Coombs Field | **W** 14–5 | **K. Johnson** (1–2) | Grant (0–1) | None | 549 | 5–5 | – |

March: 14–5 (Home: 12–2; Away: 2–3)
| Game | Date | TV | Rank | Opponent | Stadium | Score | Win | Loss | Save | Attendance | Overall | ACC |
|---|---|---|---|---|---|---|---|---|---|---|---|---|
| 11 | March 1 | ACCNX | No. 17 | Northwestern* | Jack Coombs Field | **W** 6–5 | **Easterly** (1–0) | Hliboki (0–1) | **Proksch** (1) | 1,091 | 6–5 | – |
| 12 | March 2 | ACCNX | No. 17 | Northwestern* | Jack Coombs Field | **W** 11–2 | **Zatkowski** (1–1) | Danz (0–1) | None | 528 | 7–5 | – |
| 13 | March 4 | ACCNX | | North Carolina A&T* | Jack Coombs Field | **W** 13–1 | **Healy** (1–1) | Bright (0–1) | None | 234 | 8–5 | – |
| 14 | March 7 | ACCNX | | California | Jack Coombs Field | **L** 1–14^{7} | Turkington (2–2) | **K. Johnson** (1–3) | None | 341 | 8–6 | 0–1 |
| 15 | March 8 | ACCNX | | California | Jack Coombs Field | **W** 6–2 | **Easterly** (2–0) | Shaw (0–1) | None | 844 | 9–6 | 1–1 |
| 16 | March 9 | ACCNX | | California | Jack Coombs Field | **W** 7–3 | **Calvert** (2–0) | Dessart (0–1) | None | 494 | 10–6 | 2–1 |
| 17 | March 11 | ACCNX | | George Mason* | Jack Coombs Field | **W** 6–3 | **Weaver** (2–0) | Uchman (1–1) | **Easterly** (1) | 377 | 11–6 | — |
| 18 | March 12 | ACCNX | | George Mason* | Jack Coombs Field | **W** 6–3 | **Hart** (1–0) | Madigan (0–2) | **Easterly** (2) | 382 | 12–6 | — |
| 29 | March 14 | ACCNX | | at No. 18 Stanford | Klein Field; Palo Alto, CA | **L** 1–5 | Scott (4–0) | **Easterly** (2–1) | None | 1,521 | 12–7 | 2–2 |
| 20 | March 15 | ACCNX | | at No. 18 Stanford | Klien Field | **L** 1–11^{8} | Lim (2–2) | **Healy** (1–2) | None | 1,776 | 12–8 | 2–3 |
| 21 | March 16 | ACCNX | | at No. 18 Stanford | Klien Field | **L** 5–10 | O'Harron (1–0) | **Nard** (1–2) | None | 2,041 | 12–9 | 2–4 |
| 22 | March 18 | ACCNX | | UConn* | Jack Coombs Field | **W** 12–2 | **Zatkowski** (2–1) | Van Emon (0–1) | None | 574 | 13–9 | — |
| 23 | March 21 | ACCNX | | at No. 23 Virginia | Davenport Field; Charlottesville, VA | **W** 9–5 | **Nard** (2–1) | Woolfolk (1–2) | **Easterly** (3) | 4,453 | 14–9 | 3–4 |
| 24 | March 22 | ACCNX | | at No. 23 Virginia | Davenport Field | **W** 13–2^{8} | **Healy** (2–2) | Valincius (2–1) | None | 5,227 | 15–9 | 4–4 |
| 25 | March 23 | ACCNX | | at No. 23 Virginia | Davenport Field | **W** 13–6 | **Easterly** (3–1) | Blanco (1–1) | None | 5,048 | 16–9 | 5–4 |
| 26 | March 25 | ACCN | | East Carolina* | Jack Coombs Field | **W** 6–4 | **Nard** (3–1) | Hunter (1–2) | **Easterly** (4) | 931 | 17–9 | — |
Tobacco Road Series
| 27 | March 28 | ACCN | | NC State | Jack Coombs Field | **W** 5–1 | **Proksch** (1–0) | Fritton (4–2) | None | 1,001 | 18–9 | 6–4 |
| 28 | March 29 | ACCNX | | NC State | Jack Coombs Field | **L** 6–14 | | | | | 18–10 | 6–5 |
| 29 | March 30 | ACCNX | | NC State | Jack Coombs Field | **W** 16–6^{8} | **Zatkowski** (3–1) | Marohn (3–2) | None | 1,184 | 19–10 | 7–5 |

April: 11–5 (Home: 9–1; Away: 2–4)
| Game | Date | TV | Rank | Opponent | Stadium | Score | Win | Loss | Save | Attendance | Overall | ACC |
|---|---|---|---|---|---|---|---|---|---|---|---|---|
| 30 | April 1 | ACCNX | | Davidson* | Jack Coombs Field | **W** 12–0^{7} | **Nard** (4–1) | Champey (1–6) | None | 632 | 20–10 | — |
Tobacco Road Series
| 31 | April 3 | ACCN | | at No. 19 North Carolina | Boshamer Stadium; Chapel Hill, NC | **L** 3–4 | Knapp (6–0) | **Proksch** (1–1) | McDuffie (3) | 4,045 | 20–11 | 7–6 |
| 32 | April 4 | ACCNX | | at No. 19 North Carolina | Boshamer Stadium | **W** 9–5 | **Nard** (5–1) | DeCaro (4–3) | None | 3,667 | 21–11 | 8–6 |
| 33 | April 5 | ACCNX | | at No. 19 North Carolina | Boshamer Stadium | **L** 7–8^{14} | Boaz (2–0) | **Stammel** (0–1) | None | 4,044 | 21–12 | 8–7 |
| 34 | April 8 | ACCNX | | William & Mary* | Jack Coombs Field | **W** 3–2^{12} | **Calvert** (3–0) | Osborne (0–2) | None | 478 | 22–12 | — |
| 35 | April 9 | ACCNX | | Campbell* | Jack Coombs Field | **W** 10–7 | **Zatkowski** (4–1) | Schares (1–1) | None | 502 | 23–12 | — |
| 36 | April 11 | ACCNX | | at Miami (FL) | Alex Rodriguez Park; Coral Gables, FL | **W** 13–3 | **Easterly** (4–1) | Hugus (4–4) | None | 2,930 | 24–12 | 9–7 |
| 37 | April 12 | ACCNX | | at Miami (FL) | Alex Rodriguez Park | **L** 4–5 | Giroux (4–1) | **Nard** (5–2) | Walters (1) | 2,989 | 24–13 | 9–8 |
| 38 | April 13 | ACCNX | | at Miami (FL) | Alex Rodriguez Park | **L** 6–8 | Smith (2–0) | **Higgins** (1–1) | None | 1,782 | 24–14 | 9–9 |
| 39 | April 15 | ACCNX | | Appalachian State* | Jack Coombs Field | **W** 8–4 | **Brown** (1–0) | Clark (1–1) | None | 582 | 25–14 | — |
| 40 | April 17 | ACCNX | | Pittsburgh | Jack Coombs Field | **W** 9–1 | **Proksch** (2–0) | Demi (0–2) | None | 506 | 26–14 | 10–9 |
| 41 | April 18 | ACCNX | | Pittsburgh | Jack Coombs Field | **W** 6–5 | **Easterly** (5–1) | Firoved (1–4) | **Tallon** (1) | 987 | 27–14 | 11–9 |
| 42 | April 19 | ACCNX | | Pittsburgh | Jack Coombs Field | **W** 19–9^{8} | **Easterly** (6–1) | McAuliff (2–2) | None | | 28–14 | 12–9 |
| 43 | April 22 | ACCNX | | Gardner–Webb* | Jack Coombs Field | Cancelled | | | | | | |
| 44 | April 25 | ACCNX | | Virginia Tech | Jack Coombs Field | **W** 6–3 | **Easterly** (7–1) | LeJeune (2–2) | None | 754 | 29–14 | 13–9 |
| 45 | April 26 | ACCNX | | Virginia Tech | Jack Coombs Field | **L** 8–9^{11} | Manning (4–3) | **Tallon** (0–2) | None | 1,066 | 29–15 | 13–10 |
| 46 | April 27 | ACCNX | | Virginia Tech | Jack Coombs Field | **W** 14–0^{7} | **Hindy** (1–0) | Eisenreich (1–1) | None | 948 | 30–15 | 14–10 |

May: 6–3 (Home: 4–2; Away: 2–1)
| Game | Date | TV | Rank | Opponent | Stadium | Score | Win | Loss | Save | Attendance | Overall | ACC |
|---|---|---|---|---|---|---|---|---|---|---|---|---|
| 47 | May 4 | ACCNX | | Radford* | Jack Coombs Field | **W** 15–0^{7} | **Healy** (3–3) | Nace (2–1) | None | | 31–15 | — |
| 48 | May 4 | ACCNX | | Radford* | Jack Coombs Field | **W** 17–5^{7} | **Nard** (6–2) | Steinhaus (2–5) | None | 722 | 32–15 | — |
| 49 | May 6 | ACCNX | | Queens (NC)* | Jack Coombs Field | **W** 12–2^{7} | **Johnson** (2–3) | Renaud (0–8) | None | 447 | 33–15 | — |
| 50 | May 9 | ACCNX | | at No. 9 Clemson | Doug Kingsmore Stadium; Clemson, SC | **L** 7–9 | Knaak (7–1) | **Proksch** (2–2) | None | 4,975 | 33–16 | 14–11 |
| 51 | May 10 | ACCNX | | at No. 9 Clemson | Doug Kingsmore Stadium | **W** 15–10 | **Easterly** (8–1) | McGovern (3–1) | None | 4,962 | 34–16 | 15–11 |
| 52 | May 11 | ACCNX | | at No. 9 Clemson | Doug Kingsmore Stadium | **W** 15–10 | **Zatkowski** (5–1) | Bailey (2–4) | None | 4,547 | 35–16 | 16–11 |
| 53 | May 13 | FloSports | No. 20 | at Liberty* | Liberty Baseball Stadium; Lynchburg, VA | **Canceled due to inclement weather** | | | | | | |
| 54 | May 15 | ACCNX | No. 20 | Georgia Tech | Jack Coombs Field | **L** 6–7 | Patel (11–1) | **Easterly** (8–2) | None | 613 | 35–17 | 16–12 |
| 55 | May 16 | ACCNX | No. 20 | Georgia Tech | Jack Coombs Field | **W** 14–4^{7} | **Johnson** (3–3) | Chicoli (1–1) | None | 948 | 36–17 | 17–12 |
| 56 | May 17 | ACCNX | No. 20 | Georgia Tech | Jack Coombs Field | **L** 2–8 | Jones (7–2) | **Zatkowski** (5–2) | Paden (1) | 1,059 | 36–18 | 17–13 |

Postseason: 5–3

ACC tournament: 1–1
| Date | TV | Rank | Opponent | Stadium | Score | Win | Loss | Save | Attendance | Overall | ACCT |
|---|---|---|---|---|---|---|---|---|---|---|---|
| May 21 | ACCN | (7) | vs. (15) Pittsburgh | Durham Bulls Athletic Park; Durham, NC | **W** 4–3 | **Tallon** (1–2) | Gardner (4–6) | None | 2,878 | 37–18 | 1–0 |
| May 23 | ACCN | (7) | vs. (2) Florida State | Durham Bulls Athletic Park | **L** 7–14 | Arnold (7–2) | **Proksch** (2–3) | None | 4,122 | 37–19 | 1–1 |

Athens Regional: 3–0
| Date | TV | Rank | Opponent | Stadium | Score | Win | Loss | Save | Attendance | Overall | Regional |
|---|---|---|---|---|---|---|---|---|---|---|---|
| May 30 | ESPN2 | (2) | vs. (3) Oklahoma State | Foley Field; Athens GA | **W** 12–5 | **Proksch** (3–3) | Pesca (7–3) | None | 2,800 | 38–19 | 1–0 |
| May 31 | SECN | (2) | vs. (1) Georgia | Foley Field | **W** 6–3 | **Johnson** (4–3) | Curley (4–4) | **Tallon** (2) | 3,633 | 39–19 | 2–0 |
| Jun 1 | ESPN+ | (2) | vs. (3) Oklahoma State | Foley Field | **W** 3–2 | **Easterly** (9–2) | Ure (2–5) | None | 2,831 | 40–19 | 3–0 |

Durham Super Regional: 1–2
| Date | TV | Rank | Opponent | Stadium | Score | Win | Loss | Save | Attendance | Overall | Super Regional |
|---|---|---|---|---|---|---|---|---|---|---|---|
| June 7 | ESPNU | | Murray State | Jack Coombs Field | **W** 7–4 | **Proksch** (4–3) | Schutte (8–4) | **Easterly** (5) | 2,686 | 41–19 | 1–0 |
| June 8 | ESPNU | | Murray State | Jack Coombs Field | **L** 9–19 | Silva (8–2) | **Johnson** (4–4) | Kelham (9) | 2,689 | 41–20 | 1–1 |
| June 9 | ESPN | | Murray State | Jack Coombs Field | **L** 4–5 | Kelham (4–1) | **Easterly** (9–3) | None | 2,782 | 41–21 | 1–2 |

- Win
- Loss
- Postponement
- Bold: Duke team member
- Rankings from D1 Baseball.
- (#) Tournament seedings in parentheses.
- * indicates a non-conference game.

== Rankings ==
Ranking movements Legend: ██ Increase in ranking ██ Decrease in ranking — = Not ranked RV = Received votes
| | Week | | | | | | | | | | | | | | | | | | |
| Poll | Pre | 1 | 2 | 3 | 4 | 5 | 6 | 7 | 8 | 9 | 10 | 11 | 12 | 13 | 14 | 15 | 16 | 17 | Final |
|---|---|---|---|---|---|---|---|---|---|---|---|---|---|---|---|---|---|---|---|
| Coaches' | 12 | 12* | 21 | RV | RV | — | RV | RV | RV | — | RV | RV | RV | 24 | RV | RV | RV* | RV* | 21 |
| Baseball America | 10 | 18 | 17 | — | — | — | — | — | — | — | — | — | — | — | — | —* | —* | —* | 14 |
| NCBWA† | 11 | 19 | 25 | RV | RV | RV | RV | RV | RV | RV | RV | RV | RV | RV | 25 | RV | RV | RV* | 15 |
| D1Baseball | 11 | 17 | 17 | — | — | — | — | — | — | — | — | — | — | 20 | — | — | —* | —* | 15 |
| Perfect Game | 9 | 18 | 18 | — | — | — | — | — | — | — | — | — | — | — | — | —* | —* | —* | 16 |

† NCBWA ranks 30 teams in their preseason poll, but only ranks 25 teams weekly during the season.
* A new poll was not released for this week, so for comparison purposes, the previous week's ranking is inserted in this week's slot.
