= 2025 Virginia Cavaliers baseball team =

American college baseball season

2025 Virginia Cavaliers baseball
- Conference: Atlantic Coast Conference
- Record: 32–18 (16–11 ACC)
- Head coach: Brian O'Connor (22nd season)
- Associate head coach: Kevin McMullan (22nd season)
- Assistant coaches: Matt Kirby (14th season); Joe Savino (1st season)
- Pitching coach: Drew Dickinson (6th season)
- Captains: Jay Woolfolk; Dean Kampschror
- Home stadium: Davenport Field

2025 Atlantic Coast Conference baseball standings
	Conf.				Overall
Team	W		L	PCT	W		L	PCT
No. 24 Georgia Tech ‍†‍‍^{y}	19	–	11	.633	41	–	19	.683
No. 10 Florida State ‍‍‍^{y}	17	–	10	.630	41	–	14	.745
No. 9 North Carolina ‍‍‡‍^{y}	18	–	11	.621	46	–	13	.780
NC State ‍‍‍^{y}	17	–	11	.607	35	–	21	.625
No. 23 Clemson ‍‍‍^{y}	18	–	12	.600	45	–	18	.714
Virginia ‍‍‍	16	–	11	.593	32	–	18	.640
No. 15 Duke ‍‍‍^{y}	17	–	13	.567	40	–	19	.678
Wake Forest ‍‍‍^{y}	16	–	14	.533	39	–	22	.639
No. 16 Miami (FL) ‍‍‍^{y}	15	–	14	.517	34	–	26	.567
No. 6 Louisville ‍‍‍^{y}	15	–	15	.500	39	–	21	.650
Notre Dame ‍‍‍	14	–	16	.467	32	–	21	.604
Virginia Tech ‍‍‍	12	–	18	.400	31	–	25	.554
Stanford ‍‍‍	11	–	19	.367	27	–	25	.519
Boston College ‍‍‍	11	–	19	.367	28	–	29	.491
Pittsburgh ‍‍‍	10	–	20	.333	28	–	27	.509
California ‍‍‍	9	–	21	.300	24	–	31	.436
† – Conference champion ‡ – Tournament champion y – Invited to the NCAA Tournament; As of June 23, 2025; Rankings from D1Baseball

The 2025 Virginia Cavaliers baseball team represented the University of Virginia during the 2025 NCAA Division I baseball season. The Cavaliers played their home games at Davenport Field as a member of the Atlantic Coast Conference. They were led by head coach Brian O'Connor, in his 22nd season at Virginia.

== Previous season ==
The 2024 Virginia Cavaliers baseball team posted a 46–17 (18–12) season record. The Cavaliers finished in pool play in the 2024 Atlantic Coast Conference baseball tournament, but nevertheless earned a top-16 seed and at-large berth into the 2024 NCAA Division I baseball tournament. The Cavaliers won the Charlottesville Regional, and swept Kansas State in the Charlottesville Super Regional, qualifying for the College World Series in Omaha for the second-consecutive year. In Omaha, the Cavaliers went two and out.

== Preseason ==
=== Coaches poll ===
ACC coaches poll
Predicted finish	Team	Votes (1st place)
1	Virginia	251 (13)
2	Florida State	230 (2)
3	North Carolina	217
4	Clemson	214 (1)
5	Duke	182
6	Wake Forest	171
7	NC State	168
8	Stanford	143
9	Louisville	128
10	Georgia Tech	113
11	Miami (FL)	87
12	Virginia Tech	85
13	California	60
14	Pittsburgh	52
15	Notre Dame	44
16	Boston College	31

== Personnel ==
=== Starters ===
Lineup
Pos.	No.	Player.	Year
C			
1B			
2B			
3B			
SS			
LF			
CF			
RF			
DH			

Weekend pitching rotation
Day	No.	Player.	Year
Friday			
Saturday			
Sunday			

=== Roster ===
2025 Virginia Cavaliers baseball team
Players
Coaches

#	Pos.	Name	B/T	Height	Weight	Year	Home town
0	C	Will Broderick	L/R	6 ft 1 in (1.85 m)	190 lb (86 kg)	Fr	(Texas) San Antonio
1	LHP	Tomas Valincius	L/L	6 ft 2 in (1.88 m)	210 lb (95 kg)	Fr	(Illinois) Lockport
2	INF	Henry Godbout	R/	6 ft 2 in (1.88 m)	190 lb (86 kg)	Jr	(New York (state)) Brooklyn
3	UTL	James Nunnallee	L/R	6 ft 1 in (1.85 m)	180 lb (82 kg)	Fr	(Virginia) Aldie
4	RHP	Jay Woolfolk	R/R	6 ft 0 in (1.83 m)	200 lb (91 kg)	Sr	(Virginia) Chesterfield
5	INF	Luke Hanson	R/R	6 ft 3 in (1.91 m)	200 lb (91 kg)	Jr	(Virginia) Williamsburg
6	OF	Isaac VanderWoude	L/R	6 ft 0 in (1.83 m)	185 lb (84 kg)	Fr	(Indiana) St. John
7	UTL	Aidan Teel	L/R	6 ft 0 in (1.83 m)	195 lb (88 kg)	Jr	(New Jersey) Mahwah
8	C	Trey Wells	R/R	6 ft 5 in (1.96 m)	225 lb (102 kg)	Jr	(Nebraska) Omaha
9	INF	Henry Ford	R/R	6 ft 5 in (1.96 m)	220 lb (100 kg)	So	(Virginia) Charlottesville
10	UTL	Bradley Hodges	L/L	6 ft 1 in (1.85 m)	195 lb (88 kg)	Jr	(Florida) Fleming Island
12	RHP	Charlie Oschell	R/R	6 ft 5 in (1.96 m)	225 lb (102 kg)	So	(Pennsylvania) Phoenixville
13	RHP	Ryan Osinski	R/R	6 ft 6 in (1.98 m)	235 lb (107 kg)	Jr	(Virginia) Alexandria
14	RHP	Jack O'Connor	R/R	6 ft 5 in (1.96 m)	225 lb (102 kg)	Jr	(Virginia) Arlington
15	LHP	Evan Blanco	L/L	6 ft 0 in (1.83 m)	205 lb (93 kg)	Jr	(Massachusetts) Woburn
16	RHP	Bryson Moore	R/R	6 ft 3 in (1.91 m)	215 lb (98 kg)	So	(Virginia) Fairfax
17	C	Chone James	R/R	5 ft 11 in (1.8 m)	170 lb (77 kg)	Fr	(South Carolina) Myrtle Beach
18	INF	Jackson Sirois	R/R	6 ft 0 in (1.83 m)	175 lb (79 kg)	Fr	(Virginia) Leesburg
19	UTL	Aiden Harris	R/R	6 ft 4 in (1.93 m)	240 lb (109 kg)	Fr	(Virginia) Midlothian
20	INF	Antonio Perrotta	L/L	6 ft 4 in (1.93 m)	230 lb (104 kg)	So	(Maryland) Rockville
21	INF	Eric Becker	L/R	6 ft 3 in (1.91 m)	190 lb (86 kg)	So	(New York (state)) Thiells
22	RHP	Joe Colucci	R/R	6 ft 5 in (1.96 m)	220 lb (100 kg)	Jr	(Virginia) Purcellville
23	UTL	Chris Arroyo	L/L	6 ft 2 in (1.88 m)	225 lb (102 kg)	Jr	(Florida) Coral Springs
25	LHP	Matthew Buchanan	L/L	6 ft 0 in (1.83 m)	195 lb (88 kg)	Sr	(Virginia) Lebanon
27	RHP	Drew Koenen	R/R	6 ft 3 in (1.91 m)	235 lb (107 kg)	So	(Illinois) Park Ridge
28	C	Jacob Ference	R/R	6 ft 2 in (1.88 m)	220 lb (100 kg)	Gr	(Maryland) Mount Airy
29	LHP	Blake Barker	R/L	6 ft 1 in (1.85 m)	225 lb (102 kg)	Sr	(Ohio) Chardon
30	RHP	Kevin Jaxel	R/R	6 ft 5 in (1.96 m)	220 lb (100 kg)	Jr	(New York (state)) Congers
31	LHP	William Kirk	L/L	6 ft 2 in (1.88 m)	195 lb (88 kg)	Fr	(New Jersey) Saddle River
32	OF	Walker Buchanan	R/R	6 ft 3 in (1.91 m)	220 lb (100 kg)	So	(Florida) Jupiter
33	LHP	Matt Lanzendorfer	L/L	6 ft 1 in (1.85 m)	180 lb (82 kg)	Gr	(Pennsylvania) Pittston
34	OF	Harrison Didawick	L/L	6 ft 4 in (1.93 m)	215 lb (98 kg)	Jr	(Virginia) Chesapeake
35	RHP	Michael Yeager	R/R	6 ft 3 in (1.91 m)	215 lb (98 kg)	Fr	(Connecticut) Greenwich
36	RHP	Alex Markus	R/R	6 ft 1 in (1.85 m)	195 lb (88 kg)	Gr	(Virginia) Richmond
37	LHP	Tommy Roldan	L/L	6 ft 1 in (1.85 m)	210 lb (95 kg)	So	(Maryland) Poolesville
38	LHP	Dean Kampschror	L/L	6 ft 5 in (1.96 m)	21 lb (10 kg)	Sr	(Virginia) Falls Church
39	RHP	August Richie	R/R	6 ft 2 in (1.88 m)	170 lb (77 kg)	So	(Arizona) Tucson
40	RHP	Matt Augustin	R/R	6 ft 2 in (1.88 m)	215 lb (98 kg)	So	(New Jersey) Cherry Hill
43	UTL	Max Prozny	R/R	5 ft 11 in (1.8 m)	165 lb (75 kg)	Fr	(Georgia (U.S. state)) Fayetteville
45	RHP	Wes Arrington	R/R	6 ft 4 in (1.93 m)	210 lb (95 kg)	Gr	(Virginia) Keswick
47	RHP	Nate Bassett	R/R	6 ft 3 in (1.91 m)	210 lb (95 kg)	So	(Virginia) Bristow

Head coach

Brian O'Connor

Assistant coach(es)

Kevin McMullan
Matt Kirby
Drew Dickinson

Legend

- (C) Team captain
- (S) Suspended
- (I) Ineligible
- Injured
- Current redshirt

Roster
Last update: January 27, 2025

=== Coaching staff ===
2025 Virginia Cavaliers baseball coaching staff
Name	Position	Seasons at UVA	Alma mater
Brian O'Connor	Head coach	22	Creighton University (1993)
Kevin McMullan	Associate head coach Hitting coach	22	Indiana University of Pennsylvania (1990)
Drew Dickinson	Pitching coach	6	University of Illinois Urbana-Champaign (2009)
Matt Kirby	Assistant coach	13	College of William & Mary (2003)
Justin Armistead	Baseball Administrator	10	University of Virginia (2008)
Brian McGuire	Athletic Trainer	25	Old Dominion University (1999)
Travis Reifsnider	Scouting Director	1	James Madison University (2022)
Andrew Behnam	Director of Sports Performance	1	Eastern University (2019)
Kraigen Rasalla	Assistant Recruiting Coordinator	2	Dominican University New York (2018)
Justin Weiss	Director of Operations	2	Lafayette College (2022)
Joe Savino	Pitching Coordinator	1	Elon University (2024)

== Offseason ==
=== Departures ===
Offseason departures
Name	Number	Pos.	Height	Weight	Year	Hometown	Notes
Griff O'Ferrall	6	INF	6 ft 1 in (1.85 m)	185 pounds (84 kg)	Junior	Richmond, VA	Declare for 2024 MLB draft; selected 32nd overall by Baltimore Orioles
Casey Saucke	8	OF	6 ft 3 in (1.91 m)	210 pounds (95 kg)	Junior	Rochester, NY	Declare for 2024 MLB draft; selected 107th overall by Chicago White Sox
Anthony Stephan	16	OF	5 ft 11 in (1.80 m)	195 pounds (88 kg)	Junior	Ridgewood, NJ	Declare for 2024 MLB draft; selected 389th overall by Cincinnati Reds
Bobby Whalen	18	OF	6 ft 0 in (1.83 m)	185 pounds (84 kg)	Graduate	Camp Hill, PA	Graduated
Owen Coady	19	LHP	6 ft 3 in (1.91 m)	250 pounds (110 kg)	Graduate	Larchmont, NY	Graduated
Ethan Anderson	23	UTL	6 ft 2 in (1.88 m)	215 pounds (98 kg)	Junior	Virginia Beach, VA	Declare for 2024 MLB draft; selected 78th overall by Baltimore Orioles
Joe Savino	27	RHP	6 ft 4 in (1.93 m)	220 pounds (100 kg)	Graduate	Ronkonkoma, NY	Graduated; joined coaching staff
Angelo Tonas	31	LHP	5 ft 11 in (1.80 m)	185 pounds (84 kg)	Graduate	Hillsborough, CA	Graduated
Luke Schauer	45	LHP	6 ft 2 in (1.88 m)	210 pounds (95 kg)	Senior	Washington, DC	Graduated
Patric Menk	48	LHP	6 ft 0 in (1.83 m)	235 pounds (107 kg)	Freshman	Jacksonville, FL	Did not return

==== Outgoing transfers ====
Outgoing transfers
Name	Number	Pos.	Height	Weight	Hometown	Year	New school	Source
Mark Gialluisi	3	C	5 ft 11 in (1.80 m)	205 pounds (93 kg)	Westfield, NJ	Freshman	Rutgers	
Tristan Head	17	INF	6 ft 1 in (1.85 m)	200 pounds (91 kg)	Jupiter, FL	Freshman	Georgetown	
Freddy Beruvides Jr.	33	LHP	5 ft 10 in (1.78 m)	225 pounds (102 kg)	Palm Beach Gardens, FL	Freshman	Chipola (Note: Junior college)	
Cullen McKay	35	RHP	6 ft 1 in (1.85 m)	210 pounds (95 kg)	Norfolk, VA	Sophomore	Coastal Carolina	

==== 2024 MLB draft ====
2024 MLB draft class
Round	Pick	Overall pick	Player	Position	MLB team	Source
PPI	1	32	Griff O'Ferrall	SS	Baltimore Orioles	
2	22	78	Ethan Anderson	C	Baltimore Orioles	
4	4	107	Casey Saucke	OF	Chicago White Sox	
13	14	389	Anthony Stephan	OF	Cincinnati Reds	

=== Acquisitions ===
==== Incoming transfers ====
Incoming transfers
Name	Number	Pos.	Height	Weight	Hometown	Year	Previous school	Source
Trey Wells	8	C	6 ft 5 in (1.96 m)	225 pounds (102 kg)	Omaha, NE	Junior	Wayne State	
Joe Colucci	22	RHP	6 ft 5 in (1.96 m)	220 pounds (100 kg)	Purcellville, VA	Junior	Harford	
Chris Arroyo	23	UTL	6 ft 2 in (1.88 m)	225 pounds (102 kg)	Coral Springs, FL	Junior	Pasco–Hernando State	
Drew Koenen	27	RHP	6 ft 2 in (1.88 m)	235 pounds (107 kg)	Park Ridge, IL	Sophomore	Dartmouth	
Matt Lanzendorfer	33	LHP	6 ft 1 in (1.85 m)	180 pounds (82 kg)	Pittston, PA	Graduate	Misericordia	
Alex Markus	36	RHP	6 ft 1 in (1.85 m)	195 pounds (88 kg)	Richmond, VA	Graduate	William & Mary	
August Richie	39	RHP	6 ft 2 in (1.88 m)	170 pounds (77 kg)	Tucson, AZ	Sophomore	Pima	
Wes Arrington	45	RHP	6 ft 4 in (1.93 m)	210 pounds (95 kg)	Keswick, VA	Graduate	Lynchburg	

==== Incoming recruits ====
2024 Virginia Recruits
Name	Number	B/T	Pos.	Height	Weight	Hometown	High School	Source
Will Broderick	0	L/R	C/OF	6 ft 1 in (1.85 m)	190 pounds (86 kg)	San Antonio, TX	Alamo Heights	
Tomas Valincius	1	L/L	LHP	6 ft 2 in (1.88 m)	210 pounds (95 kg)	Lockport, IL	Baylor (TN)	
James Nunnallee	3	L/R	UTL	6 ft 1 in (1.85 m)	180 pounds (82 kg)	Aldie, VA	Lightridge (VA)	
Isaac VanderWoude	6	L/R	INF/OF	6 ft 0 in (1.83 m)	185 pounds (84 kg)	St. John, IN	Illiana Christian	
Chone James	17	R/R	C/INF	5 ft 11 in (1.80 m)	170 pounds (77 kg)	Myrtle Beach, SC	Socastee	
Jackson Sirois	18	R/R	INF	6 ft 0 in (1.83 m)	175 pounds (79 kg)	Leesburg, VA	Paul VI Catholic	
Aiden Harris	19	R/R	UTL	6 ft 0 in (1.83 m)	240 pounds (110 kg)	Midlothian, VA	Pro Development Group	
William Kirk	31	L/L	LHP	6 ft 2 in (1.88 m)	195 pounds (88 kg)	Saddle River, NJ	Ramsey (NJ)	
Michael Yeager	35	R/R	RHP	6 ft 3 in (1.91 m)	215 pounds (98 kg)	Greenwich, CT	Brunswick (CT)	
Max Prozny	43	R/R	UTL	5 ft 11 in (1.80 m)	165 pounds (75 kg)	Fayetteville, GA	Starr's Mill	

== Game log ==
2025 Virginia Cavaliers baseball game log (32–18)
Regular season (32–17)

February (5–3)
Date	TV	Opponent	Rank	Stadium	Score	Win	Loss	Save	Attendance	Overall	ACC
Puerto Rico Challenge
February 14	ESPN+	vs. Michigan*	No. 2	Estadio Francisco Montaner; Ponce, PR	L 4–5 (11)	DeVooght (1–0)	Osinski (0–1)	None	450	0–1	—
February 15	ESPN+	vs. Villanova*	No. 2	Estadio Francisco Montaner	W 3–1	Koenen (1–0)	Moore (0–1)	Lanzendorfer (1)	N/A	1–1	—
February 16	ESPN+	vs. Rice*	No. 2	Estadio Francisco Montaner	W 7–0	Valincius (1–0)	McCracken (0–1)	None	600	2–1	–
February 19	ACCNX	George Washington*	No. 2	Davenport Field; Charlotteville, VA	Cancelled (snow)						
Karbach Round Rock Classic
February 21	D1B+	vs. No. 7 Oregon State*	No. 2	Dell Diamond; Round Rock, TX	L 2–7	Segura (2–0)	Colucci (0–1)	None	3,206	2–2	–
February 22	D1B+	vs. Minnesota*	No. 2	Dell Diamond	W 4–2	Lanzendorfer (1–0)	Remington (0–1)	Osinski (1)	N/A	3–2	
February 23	D1B+	vs. Oklahoma*	No. 2	Dell Diamond	L 4–5	Barfield (1–0)	Lanzendorfer (1–1)	None	4,302	3–3	
February 25	ACCNX	VMI*	No. 10	Davenport Field	W 6–4	Jaxel (1–0)	Velasquez (1–1)	Osinski (2)	3,934	4–3	
February 28	ACCNX	Dartmouth*	No. 10	Davenport Field	W 11–3	Woolfolk (1–0)	Loeger (0–2)	None	3,080	5–3	

March (10–8)
Date	TV	Opponent	Rank	Stadium	Score	Win	Loss	Save	Attendance	Overall	ACC
March 1	ACCNX	Dartmouth*	No. 10	Davenport Field	W 11–1 (8)	Valincius (2–0)	Albert (0–1)	None	4,761	6–3	
March 2	ACCNX	Dartmouth*	No. 10	Davenport Field	W 13–3 (8)	Lanzendorfer (2–1)	Isler (0–2)	None	3,920	7–3	
March 4	ACCNX	William & Mary*	No. 9	Davenport Field	W 15–4 (7)	Arrington (1–0)	Yates (0–3)	None	3,502	8–3	
March 7	ACCNX	Boston College	No. 9	Davenport Field	L 4–7	Colarusso (1–1)	Osinski (0–2)	None	4,595	8–4	0–1
March 8	ACCNX	Boston College	No. 9	Davenport Field	W 22–16	Koenen (2–0)	Schroeder (0–2)	None	5,787	9–4	1–1
March 9	ACCNX	Boston College	No. 9	Davenport Field	L 3–6	Ryan (1–0)	Colucci (0–2)	Colarusso (1)	5,919	9–5	1–2
March 11	MASN	vs. Maryland*	No. 23	Virginia Credit Union Stadium; Fredericksburg, VA	W 7–6	Osinski (1–2)	Melendez (1–2)	None	4,000	10–5	
March 14	ACCN	at California	No. 23	Evans Diamond; Berkeley, CA	L 1–6	Turkington (3–2)	Woolfolk (1–1)	None	421	10–6	1–3
March 15	ACCNX	at California	No. 23	Evans Diamond	W 10–8	Koenen (3–0)	Shaw (0–2)	Lanzendorfer (2)	610	11–6	2–3
March 16	ACCNX	at California	No. 23	Evans Diamond	W 11–5	Blanco (1–0)	Foley (2–1)	None	553	12–6	3–3
March 19	ACCNX	Richmond*	No. 23	Davenport Field	L 2–6	Peacock (2–0)	Hodges (0–1)	Santiago-Cruz (1)	3,912	12–7	
March 21	ACCNX	Duke	No. 23	Davenport Field	L 5–9	Nard (2–1)	Woolfolk (1–2)	Easterly (3)	4,453	12–8	3–4
March 22	ACCNX	Duke	No. 23	Davenport Field	L 2–13 (7)	Healy (2–2)	Valincius (2–1)	None	5,227	12–9	3–5
March 23	ACCNX	Duke	No. 23	Davenport Field	L 6–13	Easterly (3–1)	Blanco (1–1)	None	5,048	12–10	3–6
March 25	CUSA.tv	at Liberty*		Liberty Baseball Stadium; Lynchburg, VA	L 3–6	Cooper (2–0)	Colucci (1–2)	Webb (1)	1,788	12–11	
March 27	ACCNX	No. 20 Stanford		Davenport Field	W 11–8	Woolfolk (2–2)	O'Harran (1–2)	None	3,910	13–11	4–6
March 28	ACCNX	No. 20 Stanford		Davenport Field	W 13–7	Buchanan (1–0)	Uber (1–1)	None	4,354	14–11	5–6
March 29	ESPN2	No. 20 Stanford		Davenport Field	W 9–8^{10}	Buchanan (2–0)	Moore (1–2)	None	5,364	15–11	6–6

April (11–5)
Date	TV	Opponent	Rank	Stadium	Score	Win	Loss	Save	Attendance	Overall	ACC
April 1	ACCNX	Old Dominion*		Davenport Field	W 11–5	Osinski (2–2)	Park (0–3)	None	3,886	16–11	
April 4	ACCNX	at NC State*		Doak Field; Raleigh, NC	W 8–6	Buchanan (3–0)	Fritton (4–3)	O'Connor (1)	2,937	17–11	7–6
April 5	ACCNX	at NC State*		Doak Field	L 2–9	Andrews (3–1)	Blanco (1–2)	Shaffner (4)	3,048	17–12	7–7
April 6	ACCN	at NC State*		Doak Field	L 8–9	Dudan (2–1)	Lanzendorfer (2–2)	None	3,048	17–13	7–8
April 8	ESPN+	at VCU*		The Diamond; Richmond, VA	W 13-0 (7)	Hodges (1-1)	Garrett (0-2)	None	2,160	18-13	
April 11	ACCNX	Pittsburgh		Davenport Field	W 7-5	Lanzendorfer (3-2)	Firoved (1-3)	None	4,261	19-13	8-8
April 12	ACCNX	Pittsburgh		Davenport Field	L 7-8	Gardner (3-2)	Blanco (1-3)	McAuliff (3)	4,859	19-14	8-9
April 13	ACCNX	Pittsburgh		Davenport Field	W 18-0 (7)	Valincius (3-1)	Lafferty (1-2)	None	5,919	20-14	9-9
April 15	ACCNX	Liberty*		Davenport Field	L 3–10	Swink (3–2)	Jaxel (1–1)	None	3,894	20–15	
April 17	ACCNX	at No. 7 Florida State*		Dick Howser Stadium; Tallahassee, FL	Canceled (Note: series canceled in the aftermath of the 2025 Florida State University shooting)						
April 18	ACCNX	at No. 7 Florida State*		Dick Howser Stadium	Canceled						
April 19	ACCNX	at No. 7 Florida State*		Dick Howser Stadium	Canceled						
April 22	ACCNX	Georgetown*		Davenport Field	W 13–1 (7)	Blanco (2–1)	Franco (2–2)	None	3,884	21–15	
April 23	ACCNX	James Madison*		Davenport Field	W 12–6	Valincius (4–1)	Muscar (1–3)	None	4,358	22–15	
April 25	ACCNX	at No. 24 Georgia Tech*		Russ Chandler Stadium; Atlanta, GA	W 12–9	Jaxel (2–1)	McKee (5–2)	Lanzendorfer (3)	1,425	23–15	10–9
April 26	ACCNX	at No. 24 Georgia Tech*		Russ Chandler Stadium	W 6–5	Hodges (2–1)	Jones (4–2)	Markus (1)	2,935	24–15	11–9
April 27	ACCNX	at No. 24 Georgia Tech*		Russ Chandler Stadium	L 6–7 (10)	Patel (9–1)	Blanco (9–1)	None	1,705	24–16	11–10
April 29	ACCNX	VCU*		Davenport Field	W 9–8	Jaxel (3–1)	Garrett (0–3)	None	3,660	25–16	
April 30	ACCNX	Navy*		Davenport Field	W 5–1	Koenen (4–0)	Plummer (0–2)	None	3,915	26–16	

May (6–1)
Date	TV	Opponent	Rank	Stadium	Score	Win	Loss	Save	Attendance	Overall	ACC
May 7	ACCNX	Towson*		Davenport Field	W 19-1	Blanco (3-4)	Cunnane (0-3)	None	4,012	27-16	11-10
May 9	ACCNX	Miami (FL)*		Davenport Field	W 6-1	Woolfolk (3-2)	Hugus (5-5)	None	4,926	28-16	12-10
May 10	ACCNX	Miami (FL)		Davenport Field	W 10-9	Lanzendorfer (4-2)	Walters (2-3)	None	5,054	29-16	13-10
May 11	ACCNX	Miami (FL)		Davenport Field	W 8-6	Valincius (5-1)	DeRias (2-1)	Lanzendorfer (4)	5,105	30-16	14-10
May 13	ACCNX	George Mason*		Davenport Field	Canceled due to inclement weather						
May 15	ACCNX	at Virginia Tech*		English Field; Blacksburg, VA	W 12-2	Woolfolk (4-2)	Renfrow (3-6)	None	1,080	31-16	15-10
May 16	ACCNX	at Virginia Tech*		English Field	L 4–5	Manning (5–3)	Blanco (3–5)	None	1,091	31–17	15–11
May 17	ACCNX	at Virginia Tech*		English Field	W 3–1	Valincius (6–1)	Swift (1–3)	Lanzendorfer (5)	1,840	32–17	16–11

Postseason (0–1)

ACC tournament (0–1)
Date	TV	Opponent	Rank	Stadium	Score	Win	Loss	Save	Attendance	Overall	ACCT
May 21	ACCN	vs. (14) Boston College	(6)	Durham Bulls Athletic Park; Durham, NC	L 8–12	Kipp (4–3)	Woolfolk (4–3)	Gonzalez (1)	2,992	32–18	0–1

Legend: = Win = Loss = Canceled
Bold =Virginia team member
Rankings are based on the team's current ranking in the D1Baseball poll or NCAA tournament seeding for postseason play.

== Rankings ==
Ranking movements Legend: ██ Increase in ranking ██ Decrease in ranking — = Not ranked RV = Received votes ( ) = First-place votes
	Week																		
Poll	Pre	1	2	3	4	5	6	7	8	9	10	11	12	13	14	15	16	17	Final
Coaches'	4 (1)	4 (1)*	11	11	20	22	RV	RV	—	—	—	—	—	RV	RV	—			
Baseball America	5	7	8	8	19	22	—	—	—	—	—	—	—	—	—	—*			
NCBWA†	3	9	13	13	14	17	RV	RV	RV	RV	RV	RV	—	—	RV	RV			
D1Baseball	2	2	10	9	23	23	—	—	—	—	—	—	—	—	—	—			
Perfect Game	3	3	9	9	21	21	—	—	—	—	—	—	—	—	—	—*			

† NCBWA ranks 30 teams in their preseason poll, but only ranks 25 teams weekly during the season.
* A new poll was not released for this week, so for comparison purposes, the previous week's ranking is inserted in this week's slot.

== Awards and honors ==
=== Preseason awards and honors ===
Preseason awards — National
Name	Pos.	Award	Team	Selector	Source
Henry Godbout	INF	All-American	First-team	D1Baseball.com	
Henry Godbout	INF	All-American	Second-team	Perfect Game	
Henry Ford	UTL	All-American	Second-team	Perfect Game	
Jacob Ference	C	All-American	First-team	D1Baseball.com	
Evan Blanco	RHP	All-American	Second-team	D1Baseball.com	
Chris Arroyo	UTL	All-American	Third-team	D1Baseball.com	
