= 2025 Atlantic 10 Conference baseball tournament =

American college baseball tournament

- Teams: 7
- Format: Double-elimination
- Finals site: Capital One Park; Tysons, Virginia
- Champions: Rhode Island (3rd title)
- Winning coach: Raphael Cerrato (2nd title)
- MVP: DJ Perron (Rhode Island)
- Television: ESPN+

2025 Atlantic 10 Conference baseball standings
	Conf.						Overall
Team	W		L		T	PCT	W		L		T	PCT
Rhode Island ‍†‍‡‍^{y}	22	–	8	–	0	.733	38	–	22	–	0	.633
George Mason ‍‍‍	20	–	10	–	0	.667	40	–	21	–	0	.656
Saint Louis ‍‍‍	18	–	12	–	0	.600	33	–	26	–	0	.559
Davidson ‍‍‍	18	–	12	–	0	.600	27	–	29	–	0	.482
Saint Joseph's ‍‍‍	17	–	13	–	0	.567	24	–	28	–	0	.462
Fordham ‍‍‍	15	–	15	–	0	.500	25	–	33	–	0	.431
Dayton ‍‍‍	14	–	16	–	0	.467	27	–	31	–	0	.466
Richmond ‍‍‍	14	–	16	–	0	.467	33	–	19	–	0	.635
George Washington ‍‍‍	14	–	16	–	0	.467	27	–	27	–	0	.500
St. Bonaventure ‍‍‍	11	–	19	–	0	.367	20	–	29	–	0	.408
VCU ‍‍‍	10	–	20	–	0	.333	17	–	37	–	0	.315
UMass ‍‍‍	7	–	24	–	0	.226	14	–	34	–	1	.296
† – Conference champion ‡ – Tournament champion y – Invited to the NCAA tournament As of May 31, 2025; Rankings from D1Baseball

The 2025 Atlantic 10 Conference baseball tournament was a postseason baseball tournament for the Atlantic 10 Conference in the 2025 NCAA Division I baseball season. The tournament took place from May 20–24, 2025 and was held at Capital One Park in Tysons, Virginia. The 47th edition of the tournament, it was held as a double-elimination tournament. Rhode Island won the tournament, their third in program history, defeating George Mason in the final.

== Seeding and format ==
The tournament used the same format adopted in 2014, with the top seven finishers from the regular season seeded one through seven. The top seed received a single bye while remaining seeds played on the first day.

Seed	School	Tiebreaker
1	Rhode Island	
2	George Mason	
3	Saint Louis	2−1 vs Davidson
4	Davidson	1−2 vs Saint Louis
5	Saint Joseph's	
6	Fordham	
7	Dayton	4−2 vs Richmond/George Washington

== Bracket ==
Upper round 1	Upper round 2	Upper final	Final
1	Rhode Island	5
4	Davidson	3
4	Davidson	18
5	Saint Joseph's	3
1	Rhode Island	8
3	Saint Louis	2
2	George Mason	9
7	Dayton	5
2	George Mason	3
3	Saint Louis	5
3	Saint Louis	10
6	Fordham	2
1	Rhode Island	4	–
2	George Mason	1	–
Lower round 1	Lower round 2	Lower round 3	Lower final
4	Davidson	9
6	Fordham	2	7	Dayton	4	.	2	George Mason	16
7	Dayton	9	4	Davidson	1	3	Saint Louis	2
2	George Mason	5
2	George Mason	11
5	Saint Joseph's	7

== Schedule ==
Game	Time*	Matchup^{#}	Score	Notes	Reference
Tuesday, May 20
1	11:00 am	No. 5 Saint Joseph's vs No. 4 Davidson	3−18		
2	3:45 pm	No. 7 Dayton vs No. 2 George Mason	5−9		
3	7:35 pm	No. 6 Fordham vs No. 3 Saint Louis	2-10		
Wednesday, May 21
4	11:35 am	No. 4 Davidson vs No. 1 Rhode Island	3−5		
5	3:00 pm	No. 3 Saint Louis vs No. 2 George Mason	5−3		
Thursday, May 22
6	11:00 am	No. 7 Dayton vs No. 6 Fordham	9−2	Fordham Eliminated	
7	3:00 pm	No. 5 Saint Joseph's vs No. 2 George Mason	7−11	Saint Joseph's Eliminated	
8	8:30 pm	No. 7 Dayton vs No. 4 Davidson	4−9	Dayton Eliminated	
Friday, May 23
9	11:00 am	No. 4 Davidson vs No. 2 George Mason	1−5	Davidson Eliminated	
10	3:00 pm	No. 3 Saint Louis vs No. 1 Rhode Island	2-8		
11	7:00 pm	No. 3 Saint Louis vs No. 2 George Mason	2-16	Saint Louis Eliminated	
Saturday, May 24
12	12:00 pm	No. 2 George Mason vs No. 1 Rhode Island	1-4	George Mason Eliminated	
13	4:00 pm	Game 12 Loser vs Game 12 Winner (if necessary)	−		

== All–Tournament Team ==
Player	Team
**DJ Perron**	Rhode Island
Nic Notarangelo	Rhode Island
Anthony DePino	Rhode Island
Jake Butler	George Mason
Owen Clyne	George Mason
Logan Rumberg	George Mason
James Quinn-Irons	George Mason
Eli Putnam	Davidson
Noah Jouras	Davidson
Josh Cunningham	Saint Louis
JJ Gatti	Dayton

MVP in bold
