= 2025 VCU Rams baseball team =

American college baseball season

2025 VCU Rams baseball
- Conference: Atlantic 10 Conference
- Record: 17–37 (10–20 A-10)
- Head coach: Sean Thompson (1st season)
- Assistant coaches: Andrew Llewellyn (5th season); JoJo Howie (1st season); Chris O'Neill (1st season)
- Home stadium: The Diamond

2025 Atlantic 10 Conference baseball standings
	Conf.						Overall
Team	W		L		T	PCT	W		L		T	PCT
Rhode Island ‍†‍‡‍^{y}	22	–	8	–	0	.733	38	–	22	–	0	.633
George Mason ‍‍‍	20	–	10	–	0	.667	40	–	21	–	0	.656
Saint Louis ‍‍‍	18	–	12	–	0	.600	33	–	26	–	0	.559
Davidson ‍‍‍	18	–	12	–	0	.600	27	–	29	–	0	.482
Saint Joseph's ‍‍‍	17	–	13	–	0	.567	24	–	28	–	0	.462
Fordham ‍‍‍	15	–	15	–	0	.500	25	–	33	–	0	.431
Dayton ‍‍‍	14	–	16	–	0	.467	27	–	31	–	0	.466
Richmond ‍‍‍	14	–	16	–	0	.467	33	–	19	–	0	.635
George Washington ‍‍‍	14	–	16	–	0	.467	27	–	27	–	0	.500
St. Bonaventure ‍‍‍	11	–	19	–	0	.367	20	–	29	–	0	.408
VCU ‍‍‍	10	–	20	–	0	.333	17	–	37	–	0	.315
UMass ‍‍‍	7	–	24	–	0	.226	14	–	34	–	1	.296
† – Conference champion ‡ – Tournament champion y – Invited to the NCAA tournament As of May 31, 2025; Rankings from D1Baseball

The 2025 VCU Rams baseball team represented Virginia Commonwealth University during the 2025 NCAA Division I baseball season. The Rams played their home games at The Diamond as a member of the Atlantic 10 Conference. They were led by first-year head coach Sean Thompson.

This was VCU's final season at The Diamond, as the team moved to CarMax Park beginning in 2026.

The Rams had a downturn in fortune, in part due to the abrupt departure of Bradley LeCroy leaving VCU for Liberty causing a sudden amount of transfers to come in and out of the program during the offseason. As a result, the Rams had their first losing record since 2023.

== Previous season ==
The 2024 VCU Rams baseball team posted a 38–23 (15–8) regular season record, in their second and final season with Bradley LeCroy managing the team. The Rams finished second overall in the Atlantic 10 regular season, and went on to win the 2024 Atlantic 10 Conference baseball tournament, making it their third Atlantic 10 title in the last four years. VCU earned the third seed in the Greenville Regional of the 2024 NCAA Division I baseball tournament. There, they defeated Wake Forest, before suffering defeats to Evansville and East Carolina to finish 1–2.

Brandon Eike was named the Atlantic 10 Conference Player of the Year, as well as the Most Valuable Player of the 2024 Atlantic 10 Conference baseball tournament. Following the conclusion of the season, head coach LeCroy accepted a vacant job offering with Liberty University. Assistant manager, Sean Thompson was promoted to head coach, making him the youngest head coach in Division I baseball. Assistant coach Andrew Llewelyn stayed with the VCU program, and Thompson hired JoJo Howie and Chris O'Niell as part of his coaching staff.

== Preseason ==
=== Preseason Atlantic 10 awards and honors ===
Preseason awards were announced in February 2025.

Preseason All-Atlantic 10 Team
Player	No.	Position	Team	Class
Everett Vaughan	14	RHP	First	Senior
Owen Tappy	16	RHP	First	Graduate

=== Coaches poll ===
The coaches poll was released on February 12, 2025. VCU was tied for first place in the preseason poll.

Coaches' Poll
Predicted finish	Team	Points
T−1	VCU	125 (4)
T−1	Richmond	125 (1)
3	Saint Louis	124 (5)
4	George Washington	104 (1)
5	Davidson	80 (1)
6	Dayton	75
7	Rhode Island	71
8	Saint Joseph's	66
9	George Mason	58
10	UMass	44
11	Fordham	35
12	St. Bonaventure	29

== Personnel ==
=== Starters ===
Lineup
Pos.	No.	Player.	Year
C	37	Jacob Lee	Freshman
1B	55	Sean Swenson	Graduate
2B	6	Nick Flores	Freshman
3B	3	Nate Kirkpatrick	Sophomore
SS	1	Adrian Jimenez	Freshman
LF	17	Spencer Sullivan	Junior
CF	8	Seth Werchan	Graduate
RF	41	Danny Estrada	Senior
DH	46	Collin Hughes	Junior

Weekend pitching rotation
Day	No.	Player.	Year
Friday	43	Cade Dressler	Senior
Saturday	31	Brian Yetter	Graduate
Sunday	18	Miles Garrett	Graduate

=== Roster ===
2025 VCU Rams baseball team
Players
Coaches

#	Pos.	Name	B/T	Height	Weight	Year	Home town
1	INF	Adrian Jimenez	R/R	5 ft 10 in (1.78 m)	175 lb (79 kg)	Fr	(Georgia (U.S. state)) Lilburn
3	INF	Nate Kirkpatrick	R/R	6 ft 1 in (1.85 m)	215 lb (98 kg)	So	(British Columbia) Surrey
4	INF	Nick April-Gath	R/R	6 ft 1 in (1.85 m)	170 lb (77 kg)	Fr	(Florida) Valrico
6	INF	Nick Flores	R/R	5 ft 9 in (1.75 m)	185 lb (84 kg)	Fr	(Pennsylvania) Royersford
8	OF	Seth Werchen	L/L	6 ft 3 in (1.91 m)	205 lb (93 kg)	Jr	(Texas) Austin
9	UTL	Trent Adelman	R/R	6 ft 1 in (1.85 m)	200 lb (91 kg)	So	(Maryland) Darnestown
10	UTL	Elijah Coston	L/L	6 ft 3 in (1.91 m)	185 lb (84 kg)	Fr	(Virginia) Chester
11	INF	Cato Kleinman	L/R	5 ft 9 in (1.75 m)	170 lb (77 kg)	Sr	(California) Westlake Village
12	OF	Will Epstein	R/R	6 ft 2 in (1.88 m)	190 lb (86 kg)	So	(North Carolina) Chapel Hill
13	C	Casey Kleinman	R/R	5 ft 9 in (1.75 m)	170 lb (77 kg)	Sr	(California) Westlake Village
14	RHP	Everett Vaughan	R/R	6 ft 3 in (1.91 m)	210 lb (95 kg)	Sr	(Virginia) Moseley
15	RHP	Cooper Campbell	R/R	6 ft 2 in (1.88 m)	160 lb (73 kg)	Fr	(Virginia) Lynchburg
16	RHP	Owen Tappy	R/R	6 ft 1 in (1.85 m)	185 lb (84 kg)	Gr	(North Carolina) Charlotte
17	OF	Spencer Sullivan	L/L	6 ft 1 in (1.85 m)	200 lb (91 kg)	Jr	(Oregon) West Linn
18	RHP	Miles Garrett	R/R	5 ft 10 in (1.78 m)	170 lb (77 kg)	Gr	(Georgia (U.S. state)) Stone Mountain
19	RHP	Nick Frers	R/R	6 ft 2 in (1.88 m)	190 lb (86 kg)	So	(British Columbia) North Vancouver
21	RHP	Brian Goglia	R/R	6 ft 3 in (1.91 m)	175 lb (79 kg)	Fr	(Connecticut) Milford
22	UTL	Colby Motley	R/R	6 ft 3 in (1.91 m)	218 lb (99 kg)	Fr	(Virginia) Williamsburg
23	UTL	Riley Roarty	L/R	6 ft 5 in (1.96 m)	195 lb (88 kg)	Fr	(Virginia) Midlothian
24	RHP	James McGrady	R/R	5 ft 11 in (1.8 m)	190 lb (86 kg)	Sr	(Virginia) Norfolk
25	RHP	Hank Piersol	R/R	6 ft 3 in (1.91 m)	195 lb (88 kg)	Fr	(Virginia) Short Pump
27	INF	Will Henson	R/R	6 ft 2 in (1.88 m)	185 lb (84 kg)	Sr	(Illinois) Chicago
28	INF	Carter Richey	R/R	5 ft 11 in (1.8 m)	205 lb (93 kg)	Sr	(Arizona) Chandler
29	LHP	Max Moore	L/L	6 ft 4 in (1.93 m)	255 lb (116 kg)	Gr	(Virginia) Richmond
30	C	Kannon Kleine	R/R	5 ft 11 in (1.8 m)	200 lb (91 kg)	RS So	(Illinois) Galesburg
31	RHP	Brian Yetter	R/R	6 ft 1 in (1.85 m)	215 lb (98 kg)	Gr	(Pennsylvania) McVeytown
32	RHP	Drew Ramos	R/R	6 ft 2 in (1.88 m)	210 lb (95 kg)	Gr	(Virginia) Williamsburg
33	RHP	Broden Palmer	R/R	6 ft 4 in (1.93 m)	225 lb (102 kg)	So	(Washington (state)) Kennewick
34	OF	Bobby Lane	L/L	6 ft 0 in (1.83 m)	195 lb (88 kg)	RS Jr	(Pennsylvania) Trafford
35	RHP	Joe Gomez	R/R	5 ft 10 in (1.78 m)	180 lb (82 kg)	RS Fr	(California) Rancho Cucamonga
36	RHP	Brendan Erka	R/R	6 ft 2 in (1.88 m)	195 lb (88 kg)	Sr	(Pennsylvania) Allison Park
37	C	Jacob Lee	R/R	6 ft 2 in (1.88 m)	205 lb (93 kg)	Fr	(Virginia) Chesterfield
38	LHP	Jack Goleski	L/L	6 ft 3 in (1.91 m)	195 lb (88 kg)	Sr	(Virginia) Mechanicsville
39	RHP	Zachary Peters	R/R	6 ft 3 in (1.91 m)	200 lb (91 kg)	Jr	(Connecticut) North Haven
41	OF	Danny Estrada	L/L	5 ft 8 in (1.73 m)	185 lb (84 kg)	Sr	(Pennsylvania) West Lawn
42	LHP	Michael Walsh	L/L	6 ft 1 in (1.85 m)	195 lb (88 kg)	RS Jr	(Virginia) Leesburg
43	LHP	Cade Dressler	L/L	6 ft 2 in (1.88 m)	225 lb (102 kg)	Sr	(Pennsylvania) Mifflinburg
44	RHP	Brayden McCollough	R/R	6 ft 7 in (2.01 m)	255 lb (116 kg)	Jr	(Colorado) Centennial
45	RHP	Jack Hoeymans	R/R	6 ft 3 in (1.91 m)	215 lb (98 kg)	RS Sr	(Virginia) McLean
46	C	Collin Hughes	L/R	5 ft 11 in (1.8 m)	195 lb (88 kg)	Jr	(Virginia) Moseley
50	RHP	Justin Humenay	R/R	6 ft 0 in (1.83 m)	195 lb (88 kg)	Gr	(Quebec) Montreal
55	INF	Sean Swenson	R/R	6 ft 3 in (1.91 m)	220 lb (100 kg)	Gr	(Indiana) Indianapolis

Head coach

Sean Thompson

Assistant coach(es)

JoJo Howie
Andrew Llewellyn
Chris O'Neill

Legend

- (C) Team captain
- (S) Suspended
- (I) Ineligible
- Injured
- Current redshirt

Roster
Last update: December 4, 2024

=== Coaching staff ===
2025 VCU Rams baseball coaching staff
Name	Position	Seasons at VCU	Alma mater
Sean Thompson	Head coach	2	Virginia Commonwealth University (2018)
JoJo Howie	Assistant coach	1	Virginia Commonwealth University (2015)
Andrew Llewellyn	Assistant coach	5	Wingate University (2020)
Chris O'Neill	Pitching coach	1	King's College (NC) (2012)

== Offseason ==
=== Departures ===
Offseason departures
Name	Number	Pos.	Height	Weight	Year	Hometown	Notes
William Bean	10	INF	5 ft 11 in (1.80 m)	180 pounds (82 kg)	Senior	Great Falls, VA	Graduated
Ethan Iannuzzi	15	OF	6 ft 1 in (1.85 m)	200 pounds (91 kg)	Graduate	Chesterfield, VA	Graduated
Owen Tappy	16	OF	6 ft 1 in (1.85 m)	185 pounds (84 kg)	Graduate	Charlotte, NC	Graduated
Eli Weisner	21	OF	6 ft 3 in (1.91 m)	195 pounds (88 kg)	Graduate	Glen Allen, VA	Graduated
Justin Humenay	26	RHP	6 ft 0 in (1.83 m)	195 pounds (88 kg)	RS Senior	Montreal, QC, CAN	Graduated
Jake Wortman	27	C	6 ft 2 in (1.88 m)	210 pounds (95 kg)	Graduate	Fredericksburg, VA	Graduated
Nick Cosentino	32	RHP	6 ft 3 in (1.91 m)	220 pounds (100 kg)	Senior	Pittsburgh, PA	Graduated
Nic Ericsson	37	C	6 ft 2 in (1.88 m)	200 pounds (91 kg)	RS Senior	Woodbridge, VA	Graduated
Will Greer	42	RHP	6 ft 3 in (1.91 m)	225 pounds (102 kg)	Graduate	Cohasset, MA	Graduated
Campbell Ellis	46	LHP	6 ft 4 in (1.93 m)	215 pounds (98 kg)	Senior	Georgetown, ON, CAN	Graduated

==== Outgoing transfers ====
Outgoing transfers
Name	Number	Pos.	Height	Weight	Hometown	Year	New school	Source
Isaiah Wyatt	0	LHP	6 ft 0 in (1.83 m)	140 pounds (64 kg)	Richmond, VA	Freshman	Virginia State	
Chris McHugh	17	INF	6 ft 3 in (1.91 m)	200 pounds (91 kg)	Commack, NY	Freshman	NC State	
Devan Zirwas	28	INF	6 ft 3 in (1.91 m)	210 pounds (95 kg)	Imperial, PA	RS Freshman	Eastern Michigan	
Aiden Milburn	30	RHP	6 ft 0 in (1.83 m)	215 pounds (98 kg)	Baldwinsville, NY	Freshman	Binghamton	
Brian Curley	41	RHP	5 ft 10 in (1.78 m)	200 pounds (91 kg)	Midlothian, VA	Sophomore	Georgia	
Maison Martinez	55	RHP	6 ft 2 in (1.88 m)	246 pounds (112 kg)	Lake Worth, FL	Junior	Florida State	

==== 2024 MLB draft ====
2025 MLB draft selections
Round	Pick	Overall pick	Player	Position	MLB team	Source
13	18	393	Brandon Eike	3B	Seattle Mariners	
16	9	474	Brian Curley	P	Pittsburgh Pirates	
16	17	482	Christian Gordon	P	Chicago Cubs	

=== Acquisitions ===
==== Incoming transfers ====
Incoming transfers
Name	Number	Pos.	Height	Weight	Hometown	Year	Previous school	Source
Nate Kirkpatrick	3	INF	6 ft 1 in (1.85 m)	215 pounds (98 kg)	Surrey, BC, CAN	Sophomore	St. Mary's (CA)	
Seth Werchan	8	OF	6 ft 3 in (1.91 m)	205 pounds (93 kg)	Austin, TX	Graduate	Texas	
Cato Kleinman	11	INF	5 ft 9 in (1.75 m)	170 pounds (77 kg)	Westlake Village, CA	Senior	Chaminade	
Spencer Sullivan	17	OF	6 ft 1 in (1.85 m)	200 pounds (91 kg)	West Linn, OR	Junior	Linn–Benton (Note: Junior college)	
Miles Garrett	18	RHP	5 ft 10 in (1.78 m)	170 pounds (77 kg)	Stone Mountain, GA	Graduate	Missouri	
James McGrady	24	RHP	5 ft 11 in (1.80 m)	190 pounds (86 kg)	Norfolk, VA	Senior	Louisburg	
Will Henson	27	INF	6 ft 2 in (1.88 m)	185 pounds (84 kg)	Chicago, IL	Senior	Ohio State	
Carter Richey	28	INF	5 ft 11 in (1.80 m)	205 pounds (93 kg)	Chandler, AZ	Senior	Lipscomb	
Max Moore	29	LHP	6 ft 4 in (1.93 m)	255 pounds (116 kg)	Richmond, VA	Graduate	Mount St. Mary's	
Kannon Kleine	30	C	5 ft 11 in (1.80 m)	200 pounds (91 kg)	Galesburg, IL	RS Sophomore	Illinois Central	
Brian Yetter	31	RHP	6 ft 1 in (1.85 m)	215 pounds (98 kg)	McVeytown, PA	Graduate	Marist	
Drew Ramos	32	RHP	6 ft 2 in (1.88 m)	210 pounds (95 kg)	Williamsburg, VA	Graduate	Randolph–Macon	
Broden Palmer	33	RHP	6 ft 4 in (1.93 m)	225 pounds (102 kg)	Kennewick, WA	Sophomore	Portland	
Bobby Lane	34	OF	6 ft 0 in (1.83 m)	195 pounds (88 kg)	Trafford, PA	RS Junior	Cincinnati	
Danny Estrada	41	OF	5 ft 8 in (1.73 m)	185 pounds (84 kg)	West Lawn, PA	Senior	Frostburg State	
Michael Walsh	42	LHP	6 ft 1 in (1.85 m)	195 pounds (88 kg)	Leesburg, VA	RS Junior	Maryland	
Brayden McCollough	44	RHP	6 ft 7 in (2.01 m)	255 pounds (116 kg)	Centennial, CO	Junior	San Jacinto College	
Collin Hughes	46	C	5 ft 11 in (1.80 m)	195 pounds (88 kg)	Moseley, VA	Junior	Longwood	
Sean Swenson	55	INF	6 ft 3 in (1.91 m)	220 pounds (100 kg)	Indianapolis, IN	Graduate	Quinnipiac	

==== Incoming recruits ====
2024 VCU Recruits
Name	Number	B/T	Pos.	Height	Weight	Hometown	High School	Source
Adrian Jimenez	1	R/R	INF	5 ft 10 in (1.78 m)	175 pounds (79 kg)	Lilburn, GA	Parkview High School	
Nick April-Gath	4	R/R	INF	6 ft 1 in (1.85 m)	170 pounds (77 kg)	Valrico, FL	Durant High School	
Nick Flores	6	R/R	INF	5 ft 9 in (1.75 m)	185 pounds (84 kg)	Royersford, PA	Spring-Ford High School	
Elijah Coston	10	L/L	UTL	6 ft 3 in (1.91 m)	185 pounds (84 kg)	Chester, VA	Benedictine College Preparatory	
Cooper Campbell	15	R/R	RHP	6 ft 2 in (1.88 m)	160 pounds (73 kg)	Lynchburg, VA	E. C. Glass High School	
Brian Goglia	21	R/R	RHP	6 ft 3 in (1.91 m)	175 pounds (79 kg)	Milford, CT	Jonathan Law High School	
Colby Motley	22	R/R	INF/OF	6 ft 3 in (1.91 m)	218 pounds (99 kg)	Williamsburg, VA	Hampton Roads Academy	
Riley Roarty	23	L/R	UTL	6 ft 5 in (1.96 m)	195 pounds (88 kg)	Midlothian, VA	Benedictine College Preparatory	
Hank Piersol	25	R/R	RHP	6 ft 3 in (1.91 m)	195 pounds (88 kg)	Short Pump, VA	Godwin High School	
Jacob Lee	37	R/R	C	6 ft 2 in (1.88 m)	205 pounds (93 kg)	Chesterfield, VA	Matoaca High School	

== Game log ==
2025 VCU Rams baseball game log (17–37)
Regular season: 17–37 (Home: 8–18; Away: 7–19; Neutral: 2–0)

February: 2–7 (Home: 0–1; Away: 1–6; Neutral: 1–0)
Date	TV	Opponent	Rank	Stadium	Score	Win	Loss	Save	Attendance	Overall	A-10	Source
February 14	FloSports	at Charleston*		CofC Baseball Stadium; Mount Pleasant, SC	L 0–10^{7}	Brink (1–0)	Dressler (0–1)	None	713	0–1	—	Report
February 15	FloSports	at Charleston*		CofC Baseball Stadium	L 2–12	Hunter (1–0)	Yetter (0–1)	None	764	0–2	—	Report
February 16	FloSports	at Charleston*		CofC Baseball Stadium	W 10–9	Tappy (1–0)	Samonsky (0–1)	None	803	1–2	—	Report
February 18		at Longwood*		Bolding Stadium; Farmville, VA	L 3–6	Gunter (1–0)	Ramos (0–1)	None	153	1–3	—	Report
Clemson Baseball Invitational
February 21	ACCNX	at No. 14 Clemson*		Doug Kingsmore Stadium; Clemson, SC	L 2–6	Knaak (1–0)	Dressler (0–2)	Titsworth (1)	5,091	1–4	—	Report
February 22	ACCNX	at No. 14 Clemson*		Doug Kingsmore Stadium	L 3–4	Darden (1–0)	Yetter (0–2)	Garris (1)	5,173	1–5	—	Report
February 23		vs. North Carolina A&T*		Doug Kingsmore Stadium	W 6–3	Tappy (2–0)	Halford (0–1)	None	3,811	2–5	—	Report
February 25	ACCNX	at No. 5 North Carolina*		Boshamer Stadium; Chapel Hill, NC	L 4–9	McDuffie (2–0)	Coston (0–1)	None	2,628	2–6	–	Report
Central Virginia Classic
February 28	ESPN+	Toledo*		The Diamond; Richmond, VA	L 2–6	Leininger (1–2)	Peters (0–1)	None	258	2–7	—	Report

March: 5–13 (Home: 5–9; Away: 0–4)
Date	TV	Opponent	Rank	Stadium	Score	Win	Loss	Save	Attendance	Overall	A-10	Source
Central Virginia Classic
March 1	ESPN+	Penn State*		The Diamond	L 7–16	DeMell (1–0)	Palmer (0–1)	None	611	2–8	—	Report
March 2	ESPN+	Boston College*		The Diamond	L 3–4	Gonzalez (2–0)	Tappy (2–1)	None	285	2–9	—	Report
March 5	ESPN+	William & Mary*		The Diamond	Postponed (inclement weather)							
March 7	ESPN+	Princeton*		The Diamond	W 4–0	Hoeymans (1–1)	Episcope (0–2)	None	120	3–9	—	Report
March 8	ESPN+	Princeton*		The Diamond	L 4–11	D'Alessio (1–2)	Dressler (0–3)	None	210	3–10	—	Report
March 9	ESPN+	Princeton*		The Diamond	W 11–0	McGrady (1–0)	Kinneen (1–2)	Tappy (1)	239	4–10	—	Report
March 11	ESPN+	East Carolina*		The Diamond	L 2–12^{8}	White, Jr. (1–0)	Moore (0–1)	None	623	4–11	—	Report
March 12	ESPN+	East Carolina*		The Diamond	L 1–11	Moran (1–0)	Ramos (0–2)	None	258	4–12	—	Report
March 14	ESPN+	Rhode Island		The Diamond	L 4–5	Urena (3–0)	Hoeymans (1–2)	Sabbath (3)	105	4–13	0–1	Report
March 15	ESPN+	Rhode Island		The Diamond	L 11–15	Perry (1–1)	Dressler (0–4)	None	112	4–14	0–2	Report
March 16	ESPN+	Rhode Island		The Diamond	L 1–5	Cullen (2–1)	Campbell (0–1)	None	134	4–15	0–3	Report
March 18	ACCNX	at Virginia Tech*		English Field; Blacksburg, VA	L 2–13^{7}	Curtis (2–0)	Frers (0–1)	None	1,018	4–16	—	Report
March 21	ESPN+	at Davidson		Wilson Field; Davidson, NC	L 4–17	Perkins (3–3)	Hoeymans (1–2)	None	213	4–17	0–4	Report
March 22	ESPN+	at Davidson		Wilson Field	L 11–19	Fix (2–2)	Dressler (0–5)	Weber (1)	344	4–18	0–5	Report
March 23		at Davidson		Wilson Field	L 9–13	Smith (1–0)	Garrett (0–1)	None	355	4–19	0–6	Report
March 25	ESPN+	Longwood*		The Diamond	W 19–2^{7}	Frers (1–1)	Plesser (0–2)	None	278	5–19	—	Report
March 28	ESPN+	Saint Joseph's		The Diamond	W 6–3	Tappy (3–1)	Ciccone (2–2)	Peters (1)	283	6–19	1–6	Report
March 29	ESPN+	Saint Joseph's		The Diamond	W 4–3	Campbell (1–1)	Parise (1–3)	None	305	7–19	2–6	Report
March 30	ESPN+	Saint Joseph's		The Diamond	L 5–6	Greer (1–0)	McGrady (1–1)	None	256	7–20	2–7	Report

April: 7–10 (Home: 3–5; Away: 3–5; Neutral: 1–0)
Date	TV	Opponent	Rank	Stadium	Score	Win	Loss	Save	Attendance	Overall	A-10	Source
April 1	FloSports	at William & Mary*		Plumeri Park; Williamsburg, VA	W 16–4^{8}	Hoeymans (2–2)	Yates (0–5)	None	312	8–20	—	Report
April 4	ESPN+	at George Washington		Barcroft Park; Arlington, VA	W' 9–6	Coston (1–1)	Foltz Jr. (2–5)	Peters (2)	102	9–20	3–7	Report
April 5	ESPN+	at George Washington		Barcroft Park	L 3–4	Bruno (3–0)	Moore (0–2)	Cutler (5)	86	9–21	3–8	Report
April 6	ESPN+	at George Washington		Barcroft Park	W 5–2	Hoeymans (3–2)	Jeffries (0–1)	Peters (3)	79	10–21	4–8	Report
Duel at the Diamond
April 8	WRIC	Virginia*		The Diamond	L 0–13^{7}	Hodges (1–1)	Garrett (0–2)	None	2,160	10–22	—	Report
George Mason–VCU Series
April 11	ESPN+	George Mason		The Diamond	L 2–4	O'Hara (5–2)	Coston (1–2)	Meeks (2)	160	10–23	4–9	Report
April 12	ESPN+	George Mason		The Diamond	W 10–6	Peters (1–1)	Elliott (2–2)	None	160	11–23	5–9	Report
April 13	ESPN+	George Mason		The Diamond	L 5–6	Cassedy (4–1)	McGrady (1–2)	Meeks (3)	256	11–24	5–10	Report
Old Dominion–VCU Series
April 15	ESPN+	vs. Old Dominion*		War Memorial Stadium; Hampton, VA	W 16–13	Moore (1–2)	Ridley (0–1)	None	137	12–24	—	Report
April 18		at Saint Louis		Billiken Sports Center; St. Louis, MO	L 1–2	Weber (3–0)	Peters (1–2)	None	172	12–25	5–11	Report
April 19		at Saint Louis		Billiken Sports Center	L 2–4	Owen (3–2)	Frers (1–2)	Minor (2)	163	12–26	5–12	Report
April 20		at Saint Louis		Billiken Sports Center	L 2–12^{7}	Cunningham (3–1)	Dressler (0–6)	None	132	12–27	5–13	Report
April 22	ESPN+	Virginia Tech*		The Diamond	L 5–6	Berzonski (4–0)	Coston (1–3)	None	2,166	12–28	—	Report
April 25	ESPN+	Fordham		The Diamond	W 8–5	Tappy (4–1)	Dowd (3–4)	None	164	13–28	6–13	Report
April 26	ESPN+	Fordham		The Diamond	L 1–11	Rabayda (2–4)	Frers (1–3)	None	138	13–29	6–14	Report
April 27	ESPN+	Fordham		The Diamond	W 9–0	Coston (2–3)	Hanawalt (0–2)	Peters (4)	284	14–29	7–14	Report
April 29	ACCNX	at Virginia*		Davenport Field; Charlottesville, VA	L 8–9	Jaxel (3–1)	Garrett (0–3)	None	3,660	14–30	—	Report

May: 3–7 (Home: 0–3; Away: 3–4)
Date	TV	Opponent	Rank	Stadium	Score	Win	Loss	Save	Attendance	Overall	A-10	Source
May 2	BON	at St. Bonaventure		Fred Handler Park; Olean, NY	L 9–10^{11}	Saunders III (2–0)	Peters (1–3)	None	205	14–31	7–15	Report
May 3	BON	at St. Bonaventure		Fred Handler Park	L 16–17	Saunders III (3–0)	Campbell (1–2)	None	215	14–32	7–16	Report
May 4	BON	at St. Bonaventure		Fred Handler Park	L 10–11	Roggenburk (3–3)	Moore (1–3)	None	110	14–33	7–17	Report
Old Dominion–VCU Series
May 7	ESPN+	Old Dominion*		The Diamond	L 2–8^{7}	Hunt (5–0)	McCollough (0–1)	None	332	14–34	—	Report
Capital City Series
May 9	ESPN+	Richmond		The Diamond	L 2–8	Hinchliffe (2–1)	Tappy (4–2)	None	972	14–35	7–18	Report
May 10	ESPN+	Richmond		The Diamond	L 3–6	Rodriguez (3–4)	Roarty (0–1)	Bilka (3)	497	14–36	7–19	Report
May 11	ESPN+	Richmond		The Diamond	L 6–18^{7}	Gruber (4–1)	McGrady (1–3)	None	498	14–37	7–20	Report
May 15	ESPN+	at UMass		Earl Lorden Field; Amherst, MA	W 16–1	Moore (2–3)	O'Connor (2–9)	None	195	15–37	8–20	Report
May 16	ESPN+	at UMass		Earl Lorden Field	W 13–7	Tappy (5–2)	Belliveau (1–6)	None	205	16–37	9–20	Report
May 17	ESPN+	at UMass		Earl Lorden Field	W 7–4	Frers (2–3)	Powers (3–5)	Peters (5)	210	17–37	10–20	Report

Legend: = Win = Loss = Canceled
Bold =VCU team member * Non-conference game
Rankings are based on the team's current ranking in the D1Baseball poll.

== Rankings ==
Ranking movements Legend: ██ Increase in ranking ██ Decrease in ranking — = Not ranked RV = Received votes
	Week																		
Poll	Pre	1	2	3	4	5	6	7	8	9	10	11	12	13	14	15	16	17	Final
Coaches'	RV	RV*	—	—	—	—	—	—	—	—	—	—	—	—	—	—	—	—	—
Baseball America	—	—	—	—	—	—	—	—	—	—	—	—	—	—	—	—	—	—	—
NCBWA†	RV	—	—	—	—	—	—	—	—	—	—	—	—	—	—	—	—	—	—
D1Baseball	—	—	—	—	—	—	—	—	—	—	—	—	—	—	—	—	—	—	—
Perfect Game	—	—	—	—	—	—	—	—	—	—	—	—	—	—	—	—	—	—	—

† NCBWA ranks 30 teams in their preseason poll, but only ranks 25 teams weekly during the season.
* A new poll was not released for this week, so for comparison purposes, the previous week's ranking is inserted in this week's slot.
