= 2025 Richmond Spiders baseball team =

American college baseball season

2025 Richmond Spiders baseball
- Conference: Atlantic 10 Conference
- Record: 33–19 (14–16 A-10)
- Head coach: Mik Aoki (2nd season)
- Assistant coaches: Nate Mulberg (9th season); Eric Hill (2nd season)
- Hitting coach: Collin Radack (8th season)
- Pitching coach: Josh Epstein (3rd season)
- Home stadium: Malcolm U. Pitt Field

2025 Atlantic 10 Conference baseball standings
	Conf.						Overall
Team	W		L		T	PCT	W		L		T	PCT
Rhode Island ‍†‍‡‍^{y}	22	–	8	–	0	.733	38	–	22	–	0	.633
George Mason ‍‍‍	20	–	10	–	0	.667	40	–	21	–	0	.656
Saint Louis ‍‍‍	18	–	12	–	0	.600	33	–	26	–	0	.559
Davidson ‍‍‍	18	–	12	–	0	.600	27	–	29	–	0	.482
Saint Joseph's ‍‍‍	17	–	13	–	0	.567	24	–	28	–	0	.462
Fordham ‍‍‍	15	–	15	–	0	.500	25	–	33	–	0	.431
Dayton ‍‍‍	14	–	16	–	0	.467	27	–	31	–	0	.466
Richmond ‍‍‍	14	–	16	–	0	.467	33	–	19	–	0	.635
George Washington ‍‍‍	14	–	16	–	0	.467	27	–	27	–	0	.500
St. Bonaventure ‍‍‍	11	–	19	–	0	.367	20	–	29	–	0	.408
VCU ‍‍‍	10	–	20	–	0	.333	17	–	37	–	0	.315
UMass ‍‍‍	7	–	24	–	0	.226	14	–	34	–	1	.296
† – Conference champion ‡ – Tournament champion y – Invited to the NCAA tournament As of May 31, 2025; Rankings from D1Baseball

The 2025 Richmond Spiders baseball team represented the University of Richmond during the 2025 NCAA Division I baseball season. The Spiders played their home games at Malcolm U. Pitt Field as a member of the Atlantic 10 Conference. They were led by second-year head coach Mik Aoki.

== Previous season ==
Richmond finished the 2024 NCAA Division I baseball season with an overall record of 27–32 and a conference record of 13–11. They reached the finals of the 2024 Atlantic 10 Conference baseball tournament, where they lost to crosstown rivals, VCU, 16–1. Jack Arcamone, Jordan Jaffee, Phil Bernstein, and Kyle Roche were named to the All-Tournament Team.

== Personnel ==
=== Starters ===
Lineup
Pos.	No.	Player.	Year
C	17	Jason Neff	RS Junior
1B	26	Jake Elbeery	Sophomore
2B	12	Jared Sprague-Lott	Junior
3B	13	Jordan Jaffe	Freshman
SS	2	Mikey Kluska	Junior
LF	5	Johnny Hipsman	RS Senior
CF	3	Alden Mathes	RS Junior
RF	52	Christian Beal	Graduate
DH	4	Chase Conklin	Junior

Weekend pitching rotation
Day	No.	Player.	Year
Friday	25	Brock Weirather	Graduate
Saturday	14	Brendan Argomaniz	Graduate
Sunday	15	Jeremy Neff	RS Junior

== Game log ==
2025 Richmond Spiders baseball game log (25–10)
Regular season (25–10)

February: 7–2 (Home: 5–2; Away: 2–0)
Date	Opponent	Rank	Site/stadium	Score	Win	Loss	Save	TV	Attendance	Overall	A10
February 14	Navy*		Malcolm U. Pitt Field; Tuckahoe, Virginia	**W** 2–1	**Shockley** (1–0)	Beisty (0–1)	None	ESPN+	210	1–0	—
February 15	Navy*		Malcolm U. Pitt Field	**W** 2–1	**Gruber** (1–0)	Kruer (0–1)	**Rigot** (1)	ESPN+	205	2–0	—
February 16	Navy*		Malcolm U. Pitt Field	**W** 9–4	**Peacock** (1–0)	Archibald (0–1)	None	ESPN+	178	3–0	—
February 18	at William & Mary*		Plumeri Park; Williamsburg, Virginia	**W** 12–3	**Smith** (1–0)	Yates (0–1)	None	FloSports	325	4–0	—
February 19	VMI*		Malcolm U. Pitt Field	**Postponed (inclement weather)**							
February 21	Fairfield*		Malcolm U. Pitt Field	**W** 2–1	**Bilka** (1–0)	Helmstetter (0–1)	None	ESPN+	135	5–0	—
February 22	Fairfield*		Malcolm U. Pitt Field	**L** 3–6	Grabmann (2–0)	**Topolski** (0–1)	Kell (1)	ESPN+	134	5–1	—
February 23	Fairfield*		Malcolm U. Pitt Field	**W** 11–10	**Rigot** (1–0)	Phillips (0–1)	None	ESPN+	115	6–1	—
February 25	at No. 22 NC State*		Doak Field; Raleigh, North Carolina	**W** 5–1	**Reinke** (1–0)	Nance (0–1)	None	ACCNX	2,465	7–1	—
February 28	Penn State*		Malcolm U. Pitt Field	**L** 6–17^{7}	Horwat (3–0)	**M. Rodriguez** (0–1)	None	ESPN+	230	7–2	—

March: 14–5 (Home: 11–3; Away: 3–2)
Date	Opponent	Rank	Site/stadium	Score	Win	Loss	Save	TV	Attendance	Overall	A10
March 1	Boston College*		Malcolm U. Pitt Field	**W** 11–4	**Bilka** (2–0)	Colarusso (0–1)	None	ESPN+	417	8–2	—
March 2	Toledo*		Malcolm U. Pitt Field	**W** 5–1	**Reinke** (2–0)	Bergman (0–2)	None	ESPN+	115	9–2	—
March 4	Towson*		Malcolm U. Pitt Field	**W** 14–3^{7}	**Topolski** (1–1)	Rosario (0–1)	None	ESPN+	89	10–2	—
March 7	UMass Lowell*		Malcolm U. Pitt Field	**W** 11–1^{7}	**E. Rodriguez** (1–0)	Holland (1–3)	None	ESPN+	154	11–2	—
March 8 (DH)	Lafayette*		Malcolm U. Pitt Field	**W** 9–1	**Reinke** (3–0)	Helmick (1–2)	**Rigot** (2)	ESPN+	245	12–2	—
March 8 (DH)	UMass Lowell*		Malcolm U. Pitt Field	**W** 12–2	**Siesky** (1–0)	Zarnoch Jr. (0–3)	**Smith** (1)	ESPN+	143	13–2	—
March 9	Lafayette*		Malcolm U. Pitt Field	**W** 16–3	**Bilka** (3–0)	Skapinetz (0–2)	None	ESPN+	342	14–2	—
March 11	Longwood*		Malcolm U. Pitt Field	**W** 12–2	**Rigot** (2–0)	Gunter (1–3)	None	ESPN+	356	15–2	—
March 14	St. Bonaventure		Malcolm U. Pitt Field	**W** 12–0	**Bilka** (4–0)	Capellupo (1–2)	None	ESPN+	323	16–2	1–0
March 15	St. Bonaventure		Malcolm U. Pitt Field	**W** 21–7	**Topolski** (2–1)	James (0–2)	None	ESPN+	234	17–2	2–0
March 16	St. Bonaventure		Malcolm U. Pitt Field	**W** 18–11	**Shockley** (2–0)	Roggenburk (1–2)	None	ESPN+	369	18–2	3–0
March 19	at No. 23 Virginia*		Davenport Field; Charlottesville, Virginia	**W** 6–2	**Peacock** (2–0)	Hodges (0–1)	**Santiago-Cruz** (1)	ACCNX	3,912	19–2	—
March 21	at Saint Joseph's		Smithson Field; Merion, Pennsylvania	**L** 3–5	Ciccone (2–1)	**Bilka** (4–1)	Parise (1)	ESPN+	321	19–3	3–1
March 22	at Saint Joseph's		Smithson Field	**L** 5–12	Book (4–1)	**Topolski** (2–2)	None	ESPN+	400	19–4	3–2
March 23	at Saint Joseph's		Smithson Field	**W** 12–10	**Reinke** (4–0)	Campbell (1–2)	**Santiago-Cruz** (2)	ESPN+	340	20–4	4–2
March 25	at James Madison*		Eagle Field; Harrisonburg, Virginia	**W** 12–4	**Gruber** (2–0)	Barroqueiro (0–1)	None	ESPN+	322	21–4	—
March 28	Fordham		Malcolm U. Pitt Field	**L** 9–13	Stewart (2–1)	**Bilka** (4–2)	None	ESPN+	350	21–5	4–3
March 29	Fordham		Malcolm U. Pitt Field	**L** 11–15	Elson (3–1)	**Topolski** (2–3)	None	ESPN+	375	21–6	4–4
March 30	Fordham		Malcolm U. Pitt Field	**L** 18–21	Egan (1–0)	**Hinchliffe** (0–1)	None	ESPN+	320	21–7	4–5

April: 4–3 (Home: 2–1; Away: 2–2)
Date	Opponent	Rank	Site/stadium	Score	Win	Loss	Save	TV	Attendance	Overall	A10
April 4	at Rhode Island		Bill Beck Field; Kingston, Rhode Island	**W** 10–5	**Bilka** (5–2)	Jones (1–2)	None	ESPN+	146	22–7	5–5
April 5	at Rhode Island		Bill Beck Field	**L** 1–20	Levesque (3–0)	**Peacock** (2–1)	None	ESPN+	127	22–8	5–6
April 6	at Rhode Island		Bill Beck Field	**L** 9–12	Sabbath (3–1)	**Santiago-Cruz** (0–1)	None	ESPN+	86	22–9	5–7
April 11	UMass		Malcolm U. Pitt Field	**W** 9–3	'**E. Rodriguez** (2–1)	O'Connor (2–4)	**Bilka** (1)	ESPN+	245	23–9	6–7
April 12	UMass		Malcolm U. Pitt Field	**L** 6–12	Jensen (3–1)	**Topolski** (2–4)	None	ESPN+	176	23–10	6–8
April 13	UMass		Malcolm U. Pitt Field	**W** 3–1	**Giordano** (1–0)	Belliveau (0–3)	**Bilka** (2)	ESPN+	354	24–10	7–8
April 15	at Coppin State*		Joe Cannon Stadium; Hanover, Maryland	**W** 20–10	**Hinchliffe** (1–1)	Eneix (0–4)	None		150	25–10	—
April 18	at George Washington		Barcroft Park; Arlington, Virginia					ESPN+			
April 19	at George Washington		Barcroft Park					ESPN+			
April 20	at George Washington		Barcroft Park					ESPN+			
April 22	at Longwood*		Bolding Stadium; Farmville, Virginia								—
April 25	Saint Louis		Malcolm U. Pitt Field					ESPN+			
April 26	Saint Louis		Malcolm U. Pitt Field					ESPN+			
April 27	Saint Louis		Malcolm U. Pitt Field					ESPN+			

May: 0–0 (Home: 0–0; Away: 0–0)
Date	Opponent	Rank	Site/stadium	Score	Win	Loss	Save	TV	Attendance	Overall	A10
May 2	at Dayton		Woerner Field; Dayton, Ohio					ESPN+			
May 3	at Dayton		Woerner Field					ESPN+			
May 4	at Dayton		Woerner Field					ESPN+			
May 6	at Towson*		Schuerholz Stadium; Towson, Maryland					FloSports			—
May 9	at VCU		The Diamond; Richmond, Virginia					ESPN+			
May 10	at VCU		The Diamond					ESPN+			
May 11	at VCU		The Diamond					ESPN+			
May 13	Old Dominion*		Malcom U. Pitt Field					ESPN+			—
May 15	Davidson		Malcom U. Pitt Field					ESPN+			
May 16	Davidson		Malcom U. Pitt Field					ESPN+			
May 17	Davidson		Malcom U. Pitt Field					ESPN+			

Postseason (1–2)

Atlantic 10 tournament (0–0)
Date	Opponent	Rank	Site/stadium	Score	Win	Loss	Save	TV	Attendance	Overall	A10T
May 21–25	vs. TBD		Capital One Park; Tysons, Virginia					ESPN+			

- Win
- Loss
- Postponement
- Bold: Golden Bears team member
- Rankings from D1 Baseball.
- (#) Tournament seedings in parentheses.
- * indicates a non-conference game.

== Rankings ==
Ranking movements Legend: ██ Increase in ranking ██ Decrease in ranking — = Not ranked RV = Received votes
	Week																		
Poll	Pre	1	2	3	4	5	6	7	8	9	10	11	12	13	14	15	16	17	Final
Coaches'	—	—*	—	—	RV	RV	—	—											
Baseball America	—	—	—	—	—	—	—	—											
NCBWA†	RV	RV	RV	RV	RV	RV	—	—											
D1Baseball	—	—	—	—	—	—	—	—											
Perfect Game	—	—	—	—	—	—	—	—											

† NCBWA ranks 30 teams in their preseason poll, but only ranks 25 teams weekly during the season.
* A new poll was not released for this week, so for comparison purposes, the previous week's ranking is inserted in this week's slot.
