= Jonathan Santucci =

American baseball player (born 2002)

New York Mets
- Pitcher
- Born: December 28, 2002 (age 23); Leominster, Massachusetts, U.S.
- Bats: Left Throws: Left
- Stats at Baseball Reference

Jonathan Joseph Santucci (born December 28, 2002) is an American professional baseball pitcher in the New York Mets organization.

== Amateur career ==
Santucci attended Phillips Academy in Andover, Massachusetts, and played college baseball at Duke University. Prior to his freshman season at Duke in 2021, he played for the Worcester Bravehearts of the Futures Collegiate Baseball League. As a freshman in 2022, he appeared in 20 games and made seven starts. He finished the year 2–3 with a 4.17 earned run average (ERA) and 58 strikeouts in 41 innings. After the 2022 season, he played collegiate summer baseball with the Harwich Mariners of the Cape Cod Baseball League and was named a league all-star.

As a sophomore in 2023, Santucci started seven games before suffering a season-ending fractured elbow. He finished the year 2–2 with a 4.30 ERA and 50 strikeouts over 29 1/3 innings.

Santucci entered his junior season in 2024 as a top prospect for the 2024 Major League Baseball draft. He started the season as Duke's number one starter.

== Professional career ==
Santucci was drafted by the New York Mets in the second round, with the 46th overall selection, of the 2024 Major League Baseball draft. On July 20, 2024, Santucci signed with the Mets on a $2 million contract.
