= 2025 George Mason Patriots baseball team =

Season of George Mason Patriots baseball team

2025 George Mason Patriots baseball
- Conference: Atlantic 10 Conference
- Record: 40–21 (20–10 A-10)
- Head coach: Shawn Camp (3rd season)
- Assistant coaches: Tyler Nelin; Evan Duhon
- Home stadium: Spuhler Field

2025 Atlantic 10 Conference baseball standings
	Conf.						Overall
Team	W		L		T	PCT	W		L		T	PCT
Rhode Island ‍†‍‡‍^{y}	22	–	8	–	0	.733	38	–	22	–	0	.633
George Mason ‍‍‍	20	–	10	–	0	.667	40	–	21	–	0	.656
Saint Louis ‍‍‍	18	–	12	–	0	.600	33	–	26	–	0	.559
Davidson ‍‍‍	18	–	12	–	0	.600	27	–	29	–	0	.482
Saint Joseph's ‍‍‍	17	–	13	–	0	.567	24	–	28	–	0	.462
Fordham ‍‍‍	15	–	15	–	0	.500	25	–	33	–	0	.431
Dayton ‍‍‍	14	–	16	–	0	.467	27	–	31	–	0	.466
Richmond ‍‍‍	14	–	16	–	0	.467	33	–	19	–	0	.635
George Washington ‍‍‍	14	–	16	–	0	.467	27	–	27	–	0	.500
St. Bonaventure ‍‍‍	11	–	19	–	0	.367	20	–	29	–	0	.408
VCU ‍‍‍	10	–	20	–	0	.333	17	–	37	–	0	.315
UMass ‍‍‍	7	–	24	–	0	.226	14	–	34	–	1	.296
† – Conference champion ‡ – Tournament champion y – Invited to the NCAA tournament As of May 31, 2025; Rankings from D1Baseball

The 2025 George Mason Patriots baseball team represents George Mason University in the sport of college baseball for the 2025 season. The Patriots compete in the Atlantic 10 Conference (A-10) and play their home games at Spuhler Field in Fairfax, Virginia. The team is led by head coach Shawn Camp in his third season.

== Coaching staff ==
- Head Coach: Shawn Camp (3rd season)
- Assistant Coaches: Tyler Nelin, Evan Duhon
- Pitching Coach: Tommy Winterstein
- Director of Baseball Operations: Kyle Darmstead
- Director of Analytics: Abby Finch
- Certified Athletic Trainer: Hannah Stapleford

== Preseason ==
The George Mason Patriots baseball team represents George Mason University in Fairfax, Virginia, competing in NCAA Division I as a member of the Atlantic 10 Conference (A-10). The Patriots play their home games at Spuhler Field, located on campus.

The team is led by head coach Shawn Camp, now in his third season as head coach and fifth overall with the program. Camp, a former MLB pitcher and George Mason alumnus, previously served as the team's pitching coach before being promoted in 2022. He is assisted by Tyler Nelin and Evan Duhon, with Tommy Winterstein serving as pitching coach. Kyle Darmstead is Director of Baseball Operations, while Abby Finch serves as Director of Analytics.

For the 2025 season, the Patriots' roster includes 16 returning players and 21 newcomers, consisting of 12 freshmen and several transfers. The roster features:

- 6 graduate students
- 1 senior
- 11 juniors
- 9 sophomores
- 12 freshmen

Notable freshmen include outfielders Lucas Alberti and Tripp Capers, and pitchers Michael Bilo, Jake Drumm, and Louden Hilliard. Junior transfers include INF Drew Canody, RHP Brandon Cassedy, and C Garrett Pancione.

Key returning players include senior RHP Britt Yount, junior INF Evan Blanchard, sophomore RHP Cole Egan, and sophomore OF Jake Kozlowski.

In the Atlantic 10 preseason coaches' poll released February 12, 2025, George Mason was projected to finish ninth in the conference.

=== Preseason honors ===
One Patriot received preseason conference recognition:

Preseason All-Atlantic 10 Team
Player	No.	Position	Class
James Quinn-Irons	10	OF	Junior

== Predicted order of finish ==
The Atlantic 10 preseason coaches' poll was released on February 12, 2025. Richmond and VCU were tied as preseason favorites, while George Mason was projected to finish ninth*in the conference.

Coaches' Poll
Pos.	Team	Points
1	VCU	125 (4)
1	Richmond	125 (1)
3	Saint Louis	124 (5)
4	George Washington	104 (1)
5	Davidson	80 (1)
6	Dayton	75
7	Rhode Island	71
8	Saint Joseph’s	66
9	George Mason	58
10	Massachusetts	44
11	Fordham	35
12	St. Bonaventure	29

== Roster ==
2025 George Mason Patriots baseball team
Players
Coaches

#	Pos.	Name	B/T	Height	Weight	Year	Home town
1	INF	Evan Blanchard	R/R	5 ft 10 in (1.78 m)	180 lb (82 kg)	Jr	Manassas, Virginia
2	INF	Jake Butler	R/R	5 ft 11 in (1.8 m)	190 lb (86 kg)	So	Baltimore, Maryland
3	RHP	Brandon Cassedy	R/R	5 ft 11 in (1.8 m)	185 lb (84 kg)	Jr	Manassas, Virginia
5	OF	Tripp Capers	R/R	5 ft 11 in (1.8 m)	185 lb (84 kg)	Fr	Blue Bell, Pennsylvania
6	INF	Owen Hull	R/R	6 ft 4 in (1.93 m)	215 lb (98 kg)	So	Alexandria, Virginia
7	C	Garrett Pancione	R/R	5 ft 11 in (1.8 m)	205 lb (93 kg)	Jr	Warrenton, Virginia
8	UTL	Drew Canody	R/R	6 ft 1 in (1.85 m)	210 lb (95 kg)	Jr	Tampa, Florida
9	C	Andrew Raymond	R/R	6 ft 1 in (1.85 m)	195 lb (88 kg)	Fr	Middletown, Maryland
10	OF	James Quinn-Irons	R/R	6 ft 5 in (1.96 m)	230 lb (104 kg)	Jr	Reston, Virginia
11	INF	Owen Clyne	R/R	6 ft 2 in (1.88 m)	185 lb (84 kg)	Jr	Wichita, Kansas
12	LHP	Ty Uchman	L/L	6 ft 2 in (1.88 m)	195 lb (88 kg)	So	Viera, Florida
13	C	Sam Lavin	R/R	6 ft 1 in (1.85 m)	195 lb (88 kg)	Gr	Algonquin, Illinois
14	RHP	Connor O'Hara	R/R	6 ft 3 in (1.91 m)	210 lb (95 kg)	Gr	Davie, Florida
15	INF	Jonny Wall	R/R	6 ft 0 in (1.83 m)	200 lb (91 kg)	Gr	Virginia Beach, Virginia
16	OF	Lucas Alberti	L/R	5 ft 10 in (1.78 m)	185 lb (84 kg)	Fr	Toronto, Ontario, Canada
17	C	Nick Barenz	R/R	6 ft 2 in (1.88 m)	215 lb (98 kg)	Gr	Potomac Falls, Virginia
18	INF	Ty Tomlinson	R/R	6 ft 2 in (1.88 m)	195 lb (88 kg)	Fr	Portage, Michigan
19	RHP	Owen Stewart	R/R	6 ft 3 in (1.91 m)	180 lb (82 kg)	Jr	Elmira, New York
20	RHP	Brant Ertel	R/R	6 ft 1 in (1.85 m)	185 lb (84 kg)	So	Cedar Grove, Indiana
21	RHP	Daniel Elliott	R/R	6 ft 0 in (1.83 m)	190 lb (86 kg)	Gr	Fulton, Maryland
22	RHP	Ryan Edmonds	R/R	6 ft 2 in (1.88 m)	220 lb (100 kg)	Jr	Severn, Maryland
23	OF	Laken Tignor	R/R	5 ft 10 in (1.78 m)	195 lb (88 kg)	Jr	Tappahannock, Virginia
25	RHP	Louden Hilliard	R/R	5 ft 11 in (1.8 m)	180 lb (82 kg)	Fr	Milford, Ohio
26	C	Toby Hueber	R/R	5 ft 9 in (1.75 m)	175 lb (79 kg)	So	Cincinnati, Ohio
28	RHP	Dylan McCarthy	R/R	6 ft 1 in (1.85 m)	210 lb (95 kg)	So	Chester, Vermont
30	RHP	Connor Knox	R/R	5 ft 11 in (1.8 m)	195 lb (88 kg)	Jr	Manassas, Virginia
31	RHP	Logan Rumberg	R/R	5 ft 11 in (1.8 m)	185 lb (84 kg)	Jr	Okotoks, Alberta, Canada
32	LHP	Cole Egan	L/L	6 ft 2 in (1.88 m)	185 lb (84 kg)	So	Pittsburgh, Pennsylvania
33	RHP	Michael Bilo	R/R	6 ft 4 in (1.93 m)	215 lb (98 kg)	Fr	Mason, Ohio
34	C	Jake Stanley	R/R	5 ft 10 in (1.78 m)	195 lb (88 kg)	Fr	Wake Forest, North Carolina
35	LHP	Ryan Ament	L/L	6 ft 5 in (1.96 m)	230 lb (104 kg)	Gr	Parlin, New Jersey
36	OF	Jake Kozlowski	R/R	5 ft 11 in (1.8 m)	195 lb (88 kg)	So	Langhorne, Pennsylvania
37	RHP	Britt Yount	R/R	6 ft 2 in (1.88 m)	210 lb (95 kg)	Sr	Stafford, Virginia
38	RHP	Jake Drumm	R/R	6 ft 2 in (1.88 m)	185 lb (84 kg)	Fr	Burke, Virginia
43	LHP	Michael Madigan	L/L	6 ft 0 in (1.83 m)	205 lb (93 kg)	Fr	Syracuse, New York
45	RHP	Gardner Meeks	R/R	5 ft 10 in (1.78 m)	180 lb (82 kg)	Gr	Virginia Beach, Virginia
46	LHP	Shaun Okeeffe	L/L	6 ft 1 in (1.85 m)	195 lb (88 kg)	So	Toms River, New Jersey

Head coach

Shawn Camp

Assistant coach(es)

Tyler Nelin
Evan Duhon
Tommy Winterstein

Legend

- (C) Team captain
- (S) Suspended
- (I) Ineligible
- Injured
- Current redshirt

Roster
Last update: February 21, 2025

== Schedule and results ==
2025 George Mason Patriots baseball schedule and results
Date	Opponent	Location	Result	Notes
February 14	at East Carolina (DH)	Greenville, NC	W 7–3	
February 14	at East Carolina (DH)	Greenville, NC	L 3–4	
February 15	at East Carolina	Greenville, NC	L 3–4	
February 18	vs. Georgetown	Tysons, VA	L 14–15	
February 21	vs. Saint Peter’s	Spuhler Field, Fairfax, VA	W 17–2 (7 inn.)	
February 22	vs. Saint Peter’s	Spuhler Field	L 7–10	
February 23	vs. Saint Peter’s	Spuhler Field	W 14–4 (7 inn.)	
February 25	vs. William & Mary	Spuhler Field	W 12–1 (7 inn.)	
February 28	vs. Monmouth	Spuhler Field	W 9–3	
March 1	vs. Monmouth	Spuhler Field	W 12–11	
March 2	vs. Monmouth	Spuhler Field	W 16–2	
March 4	vs. Holy Cross, Worcester	Spuhler Field	W 26–6 (7 inn.)	
March 7	at Georgetown	Tysons, VA	W 8–6 (11 inn.)	
March 8	vs. Longwood	Tysons, VA	W 18–0 (7 inn.)	
March 9	vs. Towson	Tysons, VA	W 7–5	
March 11	at Duke	Durham, NC	L 3–6	
March 12	at Duke	Durham, NC	L 3–6	
March 14	vs. Dayton	Spuhler Field	L 2–8	A-10 game
March 15	vs. Dayton (DH)	Spuhler Field	W 8–0	A-10 game
March 15	vs. Dayton (DH)	Spuhler Field	W 11–5	A-10 game
March 18	vs. Towson	Spuhler Field	W 5–4	
March 21	at St. Bonaventure	St. Bonaventure, NY	W 21–2	A-10 game
March 22	at St. Bonaventure	St. Bonaventure, NY	W 14–5	A-10 game
March 23	at St. Bonaventure	St. Bonaventure, NY	L 3–7	A-10 game
March 25	at Maryland	College Park, MD	L 8–15	
March 28	at George Washington	Washington, D.C.	L 3–4	A-10 game
March 29	at George Washington	Washington, D.C.	L 7–8	A-10 game
March 30	at George Washington	Washington, D.C.	W 11–1 (8 inn.)	A-10 game
April 1	at James Madison	Harrisonburg, VA	L 5–6	
April 4	vs. Saint Louis	Spuhler Field	W 7–5	A-10 game
April 5	vs. Saint Louis (DH)	Spuhler Field	W 7–2	A-10 game
April 5	vs. Saint Louis (DH)	Spuhler Field	W 8–6 (10 inn.)	A-10 game
April 8	at Towson	Towson, MD	W 15–3 (7 inn.)	
April 12	at VCU (DH)	Richmond, VA	W 4–2	A-10 game
April 12	at VCU (DH)	Richmond, VA	L 6–10	A-10 game
April 13	at VCU	Richmond, VA	W 6–5	A-10 game
April 15	vs. James Madison	Spuhler Field	W 11–10	
April 18	at UMass	Amherst, MA	W 16–7	A-10 game
April 19	at UMass	Amherst, MA	L 1–2	A-10 game
April 20	at UMass	Amherst, MA	W 12–1 (8 inn.)	A-10 game
April 22	at Mount St. Mary's	Emmitsburg, MD	W 16–3	
April 25	vs. Rhode Island	Spuhler Field	W 5–4	A-10 game
April 27	vs. Rhode Island (DH)	Spuhler Field	W 10–1	A-10 game
April 27	vs. Rhode Island (DH)	Spuhler Field	L 9–15	A-10 game
April 29	at No. 4 North Carolina	Chapel Hill, NC	L 4–13	
May 2	vs. Saint Joseph's	Spuhler Field	W 6–2	A-10 game
May 3	vs. Saint Joseph's	Spuhler Field	W 4–3	A-10 game
May 4	vs. Saint Joseph's	Spuhler Field	W 9–1	A-10 game
May 7	at William & Mary	Williamsburg, VA	W 8–7	
May 9	at Davidson	Davidson, NC	W 15–7	A-10 game
May 10	at Davidson	Davidson, NC	L 4–6	A-10 game
May 11	at Davidson	Davidson, NC	W 6–2	A-10 game
May 13	at Virginia	Charlottesville, VA	Canceled	
May 15	vs. Fordham	Spuhler Field	W 8–6	A-10 game
May 16	vs. Fordham	Spuhler Field	L 3–13	A-10 game
May 17	vs. Fordham	Spuhler Field	L 2–5	A-10 game
May 20	vs. Dayton	Capital One Park, Tysons, VA	W 9–5	A-10 Tournament
May 21	vs. Saint Louis	Capital One Park	L 3–5	A-10 Tournament
May 22	vs. Saint Joseph's	Capital One Park	W 11–7	A-10 Tournament
May 23	vs. Davidson	Capital One Park	W 5–1	A-10 Tournament
May 23	vs. Saint Louis	Capital One Park	W 16–2	A-10 Tournament
May 24	vs. Rhode Island	Capital One Park	L 1–4	A-10 Championship Final

Note: Wins shaded green, losses red, tournaments light blue/pink.

== Postseason awards and honors ==
=== Atlantic 10 Conference honors ===
- James Quinn-Irons – Atlantic 10 Player of the Year; All-Atlantic 10 First Team (Outfield)
- Owen Clyne – All-Atlantic 10 First Team (Shortstop)
- Brandon Cassedy – All-Atlantic 10 First Team (Starting Pitcher)
- Connor O'Hara – All-Atlantic 10 First Team (Starting Pitcher); Atlantic 10 All-Academic Team
- Owen Hull – All-Atlantic 10 Second Team (Outfield/Designated Hitter)
- Lucas Alberti – Atlantic 10 All-Rookie Team
- Andrew Raymond – Atlantic 10 All-Rookie Team
- Gardner Meeks – Atlantic 10 All-Academic Team

=== National honors ===
- James Quinn-Irons – Golden Spikes Award Semifinalist

=== Atlantic 10 Weekly Awards ===
- James Quinn-Irons – Atlantic 10 Player of the Week (April 21–27)
- Brandon Cassedy – Atlantic 10 Pitcher of the Week (April 28–May 4 and May 5–11)
- Lucas Alberti – Atlantic 10 Rookie of the Week (May 5–11)
