= James Quinn-Irons =

American baseball player (born 2004)

Tampa Bay Rays
- Outfielder
- Born: June 28, 2003 (age 22); Honolulu, Hawai'i, U.S.
- Bats: Right Throws: Right

James Carmony Quinn-Irons (born July 14, 2004) is an American professional baseball outfielder in the Tampa Bay Rays organization. He played college baseball for the George Mason Patriots of the Atlantic 10 Conference. In 2025, he was named Atlantic 10 Conference Player of the Year and became the first Golden Spikes Award semifinalist in George Mason history.

== Early life ==
Quinn-Irons grew up in Reston, Virginia, and attended South Lakes High School, where he was a standout baseball player. As a senior, he hit .471 with six home runs and earned Concord Conference Player of the Year honors. He was named First Team All-Region, First Team All-State, and Second Team All-Met. He played club baseball with the MVP Dawgs.

== College career ==
=== 2023 season ===
Quinn-Irons appeared in 37 games (36 starts) as a freshman, leading the Patriots with a .380 batting average. He hit four home runs, drove in 32 runs, and stole 10 bases. He was named to the A-10 All-Rookie Team.

=== 2024 season ===
In 2024, he started 49 of 50 games and batted .302 with 13 home runs, 11 doubles, and 43 RBIs. He also stole 12 bases and improved his plate discipline, finishing among the A-10 leaders in home runs and slugging.

=== 2025 season ===
Quinn-Irons had a breakout junior campaign in 2025. He started all 55 games, hit .410, and led the team with 89 hits, 22 doubles, 14 home runs, and 78 RBIs. He also scored 67 runs, stole 28 bases, and posted a .515 OBP and .724 SLG. He earned Atlantic 10 Player of the Week honors three times and was named the 2025 A-10 Player of the Year. He became the first George Mason player to be named a semifinalist for the Golden Spikes Award.

== Professional career ==
Quinn-Irons was selected in the 5th round with the 147th pick by the Tampa Bay Rays. He made his professional debut for the Florida Complex League Rays on August 4, 2025, and was promoted to the Single-A Charleston RiverDogs on August 13.

== Scouting report ==
Quinn-Irons is praised for his physical tools. Standing 6 ft 5 in and weighing 230 pounds, he possesses plus bat speed and exit velocities over 114 mph. According to scouts, he profiles as a power-hitting corner outfielder with a high ceiling.

Baseball analysts projected him as a mid-round MLB Draft pick, with several sources highlighting his combination of power and improved contact skills. A report from Prospects Live noted it is “hard to find a better mid-major bat with power upside.”

== Career statistics ==
Year	Team	GP	AB	R	H	2B	3B	HR	RBI	SB	AVG	OBP	SLG
2023	George Mason	37	137	37	52	6	0	4	32	10	.380	.435	.511
2024	George Mason	50	182	40	55	11	1	13	43	12	.302	.386	.588
2025	George Mason	55	217	67	89	22	0	14	78	28	.410	.515	.724
Career	George Mason	142	536	144	196	39	1	31	153	50	.366	.449	.624

== Personal life ==
Quinn-Irons is the son of Anne-Lise Quinn and John Irons. His brother Conor competed for the University of Virginia’s rowing team. He majored in computer science at George Mason and enjoys weightlifting and fitness outside of baseball.

== Honors and awards ==
- 2025 Atlantic 10 Player of the Year
- 2025 Golden Spikes Award semifinalist
- 2025 All-Atlantic 10 First Team
- 2023 Atlantic 10 All-Rookie Team
- 2022–23 Atlantic 10 Commissioner's Honor Roll
