= Louisville–Vanderbilt baseball rivalry =

American college baseball rivalry

Louisville – Vanderbilt baseball rivalry
- Louisville Cardinals Vanderbilt Commodores
- First meeting: March 18, 1971; Vanderbilt 3, Louisville 0
- Latest meeting: May 5, 2026; Vanderbilt 12, Louisville 6
- Next meeting: 2027

Statistics
- Total meetings: 45
- All-time series: Vanderbilt leads, 30–14 (.690)
- Trophy series: Tied, 7-7 (.500)
- Current win streak: Vanderbilt, 1 (May 5, 2026–present)

Location of the University of Louisville and Vanderbilt University

The Louisville–Vanderbilt baseball rivalry, or the Battle of the Barrel, is an American college baseball rivalry between the University of Louisville Cardinals and Vanderbilt University Commodores.

The two nonconference foes represent the ACC and the SEC. The schools are separated by only 175 miles. The Louisville and Vanderbilt baseball teams first met in 1971 and have played a total of 45 times. Since the 2008 season, the two teams have played an annual, single game, midweek series. On May 8, 2012, the Battle of the Barrel trophy was introduced to the rivalry, giving the series its name.

== Battle of the Barrel Trophy ==
The inaugural Battle of the Barrel occurred on May 8, 2012. An oak barrel was introduced as the traveling trophy for the series to represent the significance of Tennessee whiskey and Kentucky bourbon in the two states. The trophy is not exchanged for postseason meetings.

== History ==
=== Early history (1971–2002) ===
The Cardinals and Commodores first met in 1971 when Vanderbilt pitched two no-hitters in a double-header to beat Louisville 3–0 and 2–0. The two teams would met 15 times from 1971 to 2002, with Vanderbilt winning the first 12 games. In 2002, a three games series was played in Louisville where the Cards would win the series 2–1, securing their first two wins in 17 games.

=== Corbin-McDonnell years (2008–present) ===
In 2003, Tim Corbin was hired to coach the Commodores and a few years later in 2007, Dan McDonnell was hired to coach the Cardinals. Both coaches would immediately take programs with little success and turn them into national powers. The two programs hace been amongst the best in college baseball since these coaches arrived. Under Corbin, Vanderbilt has made the NCAA baseball tournament a total of 20 times including five College World Series appearances, four national championship appearances, two national championships, four conference championships, and four regular season championships. Under Coach McDonnell, Louisivlle has made the tournament 14 times including six College World Series appearances, two conference tournament championships, and four regular season championships.

The rivalry between the two programs and coaches began in 2008 when the two teams agreed to meet every season in a midweek game. The first postseason meeting came in 2009 when Louisville hosted the Louisville Regional; its first regional host in program history. Vanderbilt was placed there as a three seed but fell to the losers bracket after losing to Middle Tennessee. Vanderbilt then won their next two games and ran into Louisville. After dropping the first game against Vanderbilt, Louisville would win 5–3 in game 2 to advance to the Fullerton Super Regional.

In 2012, the rivalry was given a name and a bourbon barrel trophy was introduced. The trophy series has been played 13 times and Louisville leads 7–6.

Since the annual series began the teams have met in the postseason six times, in 2009, 2010, 2013, 2014, 2019, and 2025, for a total of 11 games which Vanderbilt leads 6–5. The two programs met in the College World Series in 2014 and 2019. Vanderbilt is 3–0 in these games.

== Game results ==
| Louisville victories | Vanderbilt victories | Tie games |

| No. | Date | Location | Winner | Score |
|---|---|---|---|---|
| 1 | March 18, 1971 | Nashville, TN | Vanderbilt | 3–0^{7} |
| 2 | March 18, 1971 | Nashville, TN | Vanderbilt | 2–0^{7} |
| 3 | 1972 | Louisville, KY | Vanderbilt | 4–3 |
| 4 | 1972 | Nashville, TN | Vanderbilt | 17–1^{7} |
| 5 | 1972 | Nashville, TN | Vanderbilt | 2–1^{7} |
| 6 | March 22, 1973 | Nashville, TN | Vanderbilt | 3–1^{7} |
| 7 | March 22, 1973 | Nashville, TN | Vanderbilt | 6–4^{7} |
| 8 | February 25, 1990 | Neutral (Unknown) | Vanderbilt | 8–7 |
| 9 | April 26, 1995 | Nashville, TN | Vanderbilt | 13–0 |
| 10 | February 25, 2000 | Nashville, TN | Vanderbilt | 18–5 |
| 11 | February 26, 2000 | Nashville, TN | Vanderbilt | 6–5 |
| 12 | February 27, 2000 | Nashville, TN | Vanderbilt | 9–5 |
| 13 | February 22, 2002 | Louisville, KY | Louisville | 6–1 |
| 14 | February 23, 2002 | Louisville, KY | Louisville | 12–3 |
| 15 | February 24, 2002 | Louisville, KY | Vanderbilt | 6–5 |
| 16 | March 4, 2008 | Nashville, TN | Vanderbilt | 17–6 |
| 17 | April 22, 2009 | Louisville, KY | Vanderbilt | 4–3^{10} |
| 18 | May 31, 2009 | Louisville, KY* | Vanderbilt | 8–4 |
| 19 | June 1, 2009 | Louisville, KY* | Louisville | 5–3 |
| 20 | May 11, 2010 | Nashville, TN | Vanderbilt | 11–10^{17} |
| 21 | June 5, 2010 | Louisville, KY* | Louisville | 7–1 |
| 22 | June 6, 2010 | Louisville, KY* | Vanderbilt | 7–0 |
| 23 | June 7, 2010 | Louisville, KY* | Vanderbilt | 3–2^{10} |

| No. | Date | Location | Winner | Score |
|---|---|---|---|---|
| 24 | May 10, 2011 | Louisville, KY | Vanderbilt | 5–1 |
| 25 | May 8, 2012 | Nashville, TN | Vanderbilt | 3–2 |
| 26 | April 23, 2013 | Louisville, KY | Vanderbilt | 10–2 |
| 27 | June 8, 2013 | Nashville, TN* | Louisville | 5–3 |
| 28 | June 9, 2013 | Nashville, TN* | Louisville | 2–1 |
| 29 | May 6, 2014 | Nashville, TN | Louisville | 11–7 |
| 30 | June 14, 2014 | Omaha, NE* | Vanderbilt | 5–3 |
| 31 | May 12, 2015 | Louisville, KY | Vanderbilt | 5–2 |
| 32 | May 10, 2016 | Nashville, TN | Louisville | 8–5 |
| 33 | May 9, 2017 | Louisville, KY | Louisville | 6–2 |
| 34 | May 1, 2018 | Nashville, TN | Louisville | 8–4 |
| 35 | May 7, 2019 | Louisville, KY | Vanderbilt | 6–2 |
| 36 | June 16, 2019 | Omaha, NE* | Vanderbilt | 3–1 |
| 37 | June 21, 2019 | Omaha, NE* | Vanderbilt | 3–2 |
| 38 | May 4, 2021 | Louisville, KY | Louisville | 7–2 |
| 39 | May 3, 2022 | Nashville, TN | Louisville | 1–0 |
| 40 | May 9, 2023 | Louisville, KY | Vanderbilt | 12–8^{12} |
| 41 | May 7, 2024 | Nashville, TN | Vanderbilt | 4–2 |
| 42 | May 6, 2025 | Louisville, KY | Louisville | 5–4 |
| 43 | May 31, 2025 | Nashville, TN* | Louisville | 3–2 |
| 44 | May 5, 2026 | Nashville, TN | Vanderbilt | 12–6 |
Series: Vanderbilt leads 30–14
*Meeting occurred as part of the NCAA Tournament.
