= 1992 NCAA Division II baseball tournament =

- Season: 1992
- Finals site: Paterson Field; Montgomery, Alabama
- Champions: Tampa (1st title)
- Runner-up: Mansfield (1st CWS Appearance)
- Winning coach: Lelo Prado (1st title)
- MOP: Joe Urso (2B) (Tampa)
- Attendance: 13,762

The 1992 NCAA Division II baseball tournament was the 25th edition of the NCAA Division II baseball tournament. The 24-team tournament was hosted by the NCAA to determine the national champion of baseball among its Division II colleges and universities at the end of the 1992 NCAA Division II baseball season.

The final, eight-team double-elimination tournament was played at Paterson Field in Montgomery, Alabama.

Tampa defeated Mansfield, 11–8, in the championship game, claiming the Spartans' first Division II national title.

== Bracket ==
=== College World Series ===
First Round
Cal Poly San Luis Obispo	10
Sacred Heart	1
Mansfield	4
West Alabama	1
Sacred Heart	6
West Alabama	7
Florida Tech	4
Missouri Southern State	8
Lewis	2
Tampa	6
Florida Tech	0
Lewis	2

Second Round
Cal Poly San Luis Obispo	8
Mansfield	11
West Alabama	2
Cal Poly San Luis Obispo	6
Missouri Southern State	4
Tampa	7
Lewis	7
Missouri Southern State	6

Semifinals
Mansfield	3	3
Cal Poly San Luis Obispo	9	2
Tampa	15
Lewis	2

Championship
Mansfield	8
Tampa	11

== See also ==
- 1992 NCAA Division I baseball tournament
- 1992 NCAA Division III baseball tournament
- 1992 NAIA World Series
- 1992 NCAA Division II softball tournament
