= Russell Triplett =

American baseball coach

Current position
- Title: Head coach
- Team: The Citadel
- Conference: Southern
- Record: 67–52

Playing career
- 2000–2004: Clemson

Coaching career (HC unless noted)
- 2006 2007–2010 2011–2024 2025–Present: Clemson (Asst.); USC Upstate (Asst.); Newberry; The Citadel

Head coaching record
- Overall: 514–349–1

Accomplishments and honors

Championships
- 2x SAC Regular Season (2019,2023); SAC Tournament (2023); SoCon Tournament (2026)

Russell Triplett is an American college baseball coach, currently serving as head coach of The Citadel Bulldogs baseball team. He led his first season in that position in the 2025 NCAA Division I baseball season. He previously served as head coach at Newberry from 2011 through 2024.

== Playing career ==
Triplett was a utility player for Clemson, helping the Tigers to the 2002 College World Series. He hit .312 over 222 games for his career. He then playing two seasons in the New York Mets organization.

== Coaching career ==
After ending his playing career, Triplett served one season as a volunteer assistant coach at Clemson, helping the Tigers to the 2006 College World Series. He then served four seasons at USC Upstate as an assistant. In 2011, Triplett was named head coach at Newberry, where he remained for 14 years. Triplett led the Wolves to 2 conference championships and 2 NCAA Tournament appearances.

In his first season with the Bulldogs, he led The Citadel to a 30-win season for the first time since 2013 and one win from a share of the SoCon title. In his second season, the Bulldogs won their first SoCon Tournament since 2010, earning an NCAA Regional berth, where they finished 1–2.

== Head coaching record ==
Record table
Season	Team	Overall	Conference	Standing	Postseason
Newberry Wolves (South Atlantic Conference) (2011–2024)
2011	Newberry Wolves	24–28	13–13	6th	SAC Tournament
2012	Newberry Wolves	20–31	12–15	6th	SAC Tournament
2013	Newberry Wolves	29–22	13–12	4th	SAC Tournament
2013	Newberry Wolves	29–22	13–12	4th	SAC Tournament
2014	Newberry Wolves	30–20	17–13	4th	SAC Tournament
2015	Newberry Wolves	34–18	21–8	2nd	SAC Tournament
2016	Newberry Wolves	33–19–1	13–11	T–4th	SAC Tournament
2017	Newberry Wolves	32–21	16–8	3rd	SAC Tournament
2018	Newberry Wolves	25–23	13–14	T–5th	SAC Tournament
2019	Newberry Wolves	41–16	21–3	1st	SAC Tournament
2020	Newberry Wolves	18–6	7–2		Season Cancelled
2021	Newberry Wolves	25–15	19–9	3rd	SAC Tournament
2022	Newberry Wolves	38–13	19–5	2nd	SAC Tournament
2023	Newberry Wolves	43–15	19–4	1st	NCAA Regional
2024	Newberry Wolves	26–28	18–12	T–3rd	SAC Tournament
Newberry:		447–297–1	234–141		
The Citadel Bulldogs (Southern Conference) (2025–present)
2025	The Citadel	31–26	12–9	3rd	SoCon Tournament
2026	The Citadel	36–26	11–10	5th	NCAA Regional
The Citadel:		67–52	23–19		
Total:		514–349–1			
National champion Postseason invitational champion Conference regular season champion Conference regular season and conference tournament champion Division regular season champion Division regular season and conference tournament champion Conference tournament champion

== See also ==
- List of current NCAA Division I baseball coaches
