= 2025 Clemson Tigers baseball team =

American college baseball season

2025 Clemson Tigers baseball

Clemson Regional, 1–2
- Conference: Atlantic Coast Conference

Ranking
- Coaches: No. 20
- D1Baseball.com: No. 23
- Record: 45–18 (18–12 ACC)
- Head coach: Erik Bakich (3rd season)
- Assistant coaches: Nick Schnabel (3rd season); Jimmy Belanger (3rd season); Griffin Mazur (3rd season)
- Home stadium: Doug Kingsmore Stadium

2025 Atlantic Coast Conference baseball standings
	Conf.				Overall
Team	W		L	PCT	W		L	PCT
No. 24 Georgia Tech ‍†‍‍^{y}	19	–	11	.633	41	–	19	.683
No. 10 Florida State ‍‍‍^{y}	17	–	10	.630	41	–	14	.745
No. 9 North Carolina ‍‍‡‍^{y}	18	–	11	.621	46	–	13	.780
NC State ‍‍‍^{y}	17	–	11	.607	35	–	21	.625
No. 23 Clemson ‍‍‍^{y}	18	–	12	.600	45	–	18	.714
Virginia ‍‍‍	16	–	11	.593	32	–	18	.640
No. 15 Duke ‍‍‍^{y}	17	–	13	.567	40	–	19	.678
Wake Forest ‍‍‍^{y}	16	–	14	.533	39	–	22	.639
No. 16 Miami (FL) ‍‍‍^{y}	15	–	14	.517	34	–	26	.567
No. 6 Louisville ‍‍‍^{y}	15	–	15	.500	39	–	21	.650
Notre Dame ‍‍‍	14	–	16	.467	32	–	21	.604
Virginia Tech ‍‍‍	12	–	18	.400	31	–	25	.554
Stanford ‍‍‍	11	–	19	.367	27	–	25	.519
Boston College ‍‍‍	11	–	19	.367	28	–	29	.491
Pittsburgh ‍‍‍	10	–	20	.333	28	–	27	.509
California ‍‍‍	9	–	21	.300	24	–	31	.436
† – Conference champion ‡ – Tournament champion y – Invited to the NCAA Tournament; As of June 23, 2025; Rankings from D1Baseball

The 2025 Clemson Tigers baseball team was the varsity intercollegiate baseball team that represented Clemson University during the 2025 NCAA Division I baseball season. The Tigers competed in the Atlantic Coast Conference (ACC) and were led by third-year head coach Erik Bakich. Clemson played its home games at Doug Kingsmore Stadium in Clemson, South Carolina.

The Tigers began the season ranked fifteenth overall and traveled to the Shriners Children's College Showdown in Texas. They finished the tournament 2–1 with defeats of seventeenth-ranked Oklahoma State and twenty-first ranked Arizona and a loss to unranked Ole Miss. They finished the month without losing another game as they went 4–0 in the Clemson Baseball Invitational and defeated Winthrop. They swept rivals South Carolina in a home-neutral-away three game series. They extended their unbeaten run to fifteen games and moved up to tenth in the rankings before opening ACC play against Notre Dame. They won that series two games to one. Their winning streak ended at seventeen games when they lost to Notre Dame 7–3 on March 16. They won two mid-week games over The Citadel before facing eleventh-ranked Wake Forest while the Tigers were ranked seventh. They won the series 2–1 before losing a mid-week game against Coastal Carolina. They moved up to sixth in the rankings to face number twenty-five Georgia Tech. The Tigers won the series 2–1 in Atlanta. The Tigers finished March with an 18–4 record. Clemson went on an eight-game winning streak including a neutral site victory over Georgia Southern, a sweep of ACC newcomers California, and a defeat of Gardner–Webb. Stanford ended their winning streak, but the Tigers took the series against the Cardinal. The team rose to third in the rankings and won a series against seventeenth-ranked Louisville, two games to one. They defeated tenth-ranked Georgia before closing April against twenty-fifth ranked NC State. NC State swept Clemson, who was ranked second at the time, three games to zero. The Tigers finished April with a 10–5 record. May was a difficult month for the Tigers, as they fell from third in the rankings to fifteenth. They lost a series at fifth-ranked Florida State, lost a mid-week game at fourteenth-ranked Coastal Carolina, and lost a series against Duke. The Tigers finished the regular season with a sweep at Pittsburgh. They finished May 5–5.

The Tigers finished the ACC regular season 41–15 and 18–12 in ACC play to finish in fifth place, just one game back of first. They were the fifth seed in the ACC tournament and earned a bye into the Second Round in the new tournament format. There they defeated twelfth-seed Virginia Tech 6–1. In the Quarterfinals, they faced fourth-seed NC State who had swept the Tigers during the regular season. Clemson executed its revenge, winning 7–6. They defeated first-seed Georgia Tech in the Semifinals, and prevailed 9–4. They qualified for their second ACC final in three years, but fell to third-seed North Carolina 14–4. They received an at-large bid to the NCAA tournament and were selected as the eleventh-overall seed. They hosted a regional and were placed in the Baton Rouge Super Regional. The Tigers won their opening game against USC Upstate 7–3. They lost their next game against West Virginia 9–6. They faced Kentucky in an elimination game and lost 16–4 to end their season. The Tigers finished with a final record of 45–18. Their 45 total wins were the most since 2018.

== Previous season ==
The Tigers finished the ACC regular season 40–13 and 20–10 in ACC play to finish as Atlantic Division champions. They were the second overall seed in the ACC tournament and were placed in pool B with Louisville and Miami. They lost to Miami 7–8 and defeated Louisville 8–7, but that was not enough to advance from the pool. They received an at-large bid to the NCAA tournament and were the sixth overall seed. They were selected as hosts of a Super Regional for the first time since 2010. They defeated High Point and Coastal Carolina twice to advance to the Super Regional. They lost twice to Florida and were unable to advance to the College World Series.

== Roster moves ==
=== 2024 MLB draft ===
The Tigers had five players drafted in the 2024 MLB draft.

Player	Position	Round	Overall	MLB Team
Blake Wright	Infield	4	106	Colorado Rockies
Austin Gordon	Right-handed Pitcher	4	110	Los Angeles Angels
Will Taylor	Outfield	5	145	Pittsburgh Pirates
Tristan Smith	Left-handed Pitcher	5	150	Cincinnati Reds
Rocco Reid	Left-handed Pitcher	15	464	Arizona Diamondbacks

=== MLB Free Agent Signings ===
Two Tigers signed free agent contracts after the MLB draft.

Player	Position	MLB Team
Jacob Hinderleider	Infield	Colorado Rockies
Jimmy Obertop	Catcher/Infield	Colorado Rockies

==== Other departures ====
Other Departures
Name	B/T	Number	Pos.	Height	Weight	Year	Hometown	Reason for departure
Nolan Nawrocki	R/R	2	INF	6'1"	200	(redshirt) Freshman	Rockville Centre, New York	Transferred to South Carolina
Cooper Blauser	R/R	4	INF	6'0"	195	(redshirt) Freshman	Johns Creek, Georgia	Transferred to Jacksonville State
Alden Mathes	L/L	17	OF	6'0"	200	Graduate Student	Broomall, Pennsylvania	Graduated
Nathan Hall	R/R	22	OF	6'3"	200	Sophomore	Lexington, South Carolina	Transferred to South Carolina
Ty Olenchuk	L/R	24	RHP	6'2"	200	Senior	Irmo, South Carolina	Graduated
Billy Barlow	R/R	30	RHP	6'2"	215	(redshirt) Sophomore	North Myrtle Beach, South Carolina	Transferred to Florida
Nick Couch	R/R	32	C/OF	5'10"	180	(redshirt) Senior	Greenville, South Carolina	Graduated
Matthew Marchal	R/R	36	RHP	6'3"	205	(redshirt) Senior	Greenville, South Carolina	Graduated
Devin Parks	R/R	42	OF	5'11"	190	Freshman	Fort Mill, South Carolina	Transferred to Florida SouthWestern
Rob Hughes	R/R	48	RHP	6'2"	235	(redshirt) Senior	Rock Hill, South Carolina	Graduated

=== Incoming transfers ===
Incoming transfers
Name	B/T	Number	Pos.	Height	Weight	Year	Hometown	Previous school
Dominic Listi	L/L	6	OF	5'11"	205	Graduate Student	Crystal Lake, Illinois	Indiana State
Josh Paino	R/R	8	INF	5'11"	200	Graduate Student	Temecula, California	Cal Baptist
Hudson Lee	R/L	12	LHP	6'4"	230	(redshirt) Sophomore	Roebuck, South Carolina	Wake Forest
Luke Gaffney	R/R	16	INF/C	6'1"	215	(redshirt) Sophomore	Danville, Kentucky	Purdue
Luke Kissenberth	R/R	30	RHP	6'0"	170	Graduate Student	Greenville, South Carolina	The Citadel
Michael Gillen	R/R	42	RHP	6'2"	220	Junior	Rochelle Park, New Jersey	Seton Hall
Collin Priest	L/R	99	INF	6'3"	245	Sophomore	Mount Dora, Florida	Michigan

=== Incoming recruits ===
Incoming Recruits
Name	B/T	Number	Pos.	Height	Weight	Hometown	High School
Josh Castellani	L/R	17	INF	6'4"	210	St. Petersburg, Florida	Hollins
TP Wentworth	L/L	18	OF/LHP	6'5"	230	Ripon, California	Central Catholic
Anthony Wilkie	R/R	22	RHP/1B	6'5"	225	Gainesville, Florida	Buchholz
Briggs Sullivan	R/R	29	INF/OF	6'2"	190	Mount Pleasant, South Carolina	Oceanside Collegiate Academy
Brendon Bennett	L/L	32	LHP	6'1"	220	Novi, Michigan	Novi
Dane Moehler	R/R	36	RHP	6'2"	205	Marietta, Georgia	Walton
Cannon Feazell	R/R	41	RHP	6'1"	195	Windermere, Florida	Windermere
Chayce Kieck	R/R	45	RHP	6'1"	185	Jacksonville, Florida	The Bolles School
Austin Jacobs	R/R	48	INF	6'0"	175	Geneva, Florida	Hagerty
Owen Anchors	L/L	55	OF	6'2"	190	Dunwoody, Georgia	Dunwoody
Dion Brown	R/R	93	RHP	5'10"	145	York, South Carolina	Clover
Talan Bell	L/L	96	LHP/OF	5'10"	180	Oviedo, Florida	Hagerty

== Personnel ==
=== Roster ===
2025 Clemson Tigers baseball team
Players
Coaches

#	Pos.	Name	B/T	Height	Weight	Year	Home town
00	RHP	Drew Titsworth	L/R	6 ft 3 in (1.91 m)	215 lb (98 kg)	So	Frankenmuth, Michigan
1	OF	Lleyton Lackey	S/L	5 ft 6 in (1.68 m)	160 lb (73 kg)	Jr	Evans, Georgia
2	C	Hideki Prather	R/R	5 ft 10 in (1.78 m)	195 lb (88 kg)	RS Fr	Oakland, California
3	OF	Jack Crighton	R/R	6 ft 3 in (1.91 m)	200 lb (91 kg)	Jr	Rochester Hills, Michigan
4	INF	Tryston McCladdie	L/R	5 ft 10 in (1.78 m)	190 lb (86 kg)	So	Harlem, Georgia
5	INF	Andrew Ciufo	R/R	6 ft 0 in (1.83 m)	200 lb (91 kg)	RS Gr	Medford, New York
6	OF	Dominic Listi	L/L	5 ft 11 in (1.8 m)	205 lb (93 kg)	RS Gr	Crystal Lake, Illinois
8	INF	Josh Paino	R/R	5 ft 11 in (1.8 m)	200 lb (91 kg)	RS Gr	Temecula, California
9	C	Jacob Jarrell	R/R	6 ft 0 in (1.83 m)	205 lb (93 kg)	Jr	Florence, South Carolina
10	OF	Cam Cannarella	L/R	6 ft 0 in (1.83 m)	185 lb (84 kg)	Jr	Hartsville, South Carolina
11	C	Steele Burd	R/R	6 ft 0 in (1.83 m)	210 lb (95 kg)	Fr	Hilton Head Island, South Carolina
12	LHP	Hudson Lee	R/L	6 ft 4 in (1.93 m)	230 lb (104 kg)	RS So	Roebuck, South Carolina
13	LHP	B.J. Bailey	L/L	6 ft 3 in (1.91 m)	180 lb (82 kg)	RS Sr	Woodruff, South Carolina
15	RHP	Reed Garris	R/R	6 ft 0 in (1.83 m)	215 lb (98 kg)	Sr	Mount Pleasant, South Carolina
16	INF	Luke Gaffney	R/R	6 ft 1 in (1.85 m)	215 lb (98 kg)	RS So	Danville, Kentucky
17	INF	Josh Castellani	L/R	6 ft 4 in (1.93 m)	210 lb (95 kg)	Fr	St. Petersburg, Florida
18	OF	T.P. Wentworth	L/L	6 ft 3 in (1.91 m)	230 lb (104 kg)	Fr	Ripon, California
19	RHP	Aidan Knaak	R/R	6 ft 0 in (1.83 m)	205 lb (93 kg)	So	Fort Myers, Florida
20	RHP	Nathan Dvorsky	R/R	6 ft 1 in (1.85 m)	200 lb (91 kg)	Jr	Suwanee, Georgia
21	INF	Jay Dillard	R/R	5 ft 9 in (1.75 m)	175 lb (79 kg)	RS So	Anderson, South Carolina
22	RHP	Anthony Wilkie	R/R	6 ft 5 in (1.96 m)	225 lb (102 kg)	Fr	Gainesville, Florida
23	INF	Jarren Purify	R/R	5 ft 10 in (1.78 m)	190 lb (86 kg)	So	Detroit, Michigan
24	RHP	Joe Allen	R/R	6 ft 3 in (1.91 m)	225 lb (102 kg)	Jr	Hampton Falls, New Hampshire
25	RHP	Luke Brown	R/R	6 ft 7 in (2.01 m)	205 lb (93 kg)	So	Apex, North Carolina
26	RHP	Casey Tallent (injured)	R/R	6 ft 0 in (1.83 m)	225 lb (102 kg)	RS Jr	Hartwell, Georgia
27	OF	Tristan Bissetta	L/L	6 ft 1 in (1.85 m)	225 lb (102 kg)	RS Jr	Greenville, South Carolina
29	INF	Briggs Sullivan	R/R	6 ft 1 in (1.85 m)	190 lb (86 kg)	Fr	Mount Pleasant, South Carolina
30	RHP	Luke Kissenberth	R/R	6 ft 0 in (1.83 m)	170 lb (77 kg)	RS Sr	Greenville, South Carolina
31	LHP	Jacob McGovern	L/L	6 ft 1 in (1.85 m)	195 lb (88 kg)	So	Seneca, South Carolina
32	LHP	Brendon Bennett	L/L	6 ft 1 in (1.85 m)	220 lb (100 kg)	Fr	Novi, Michigan
33	LHP	Justin LeGuernic	R/L	6 ft 4 in (1.93 m)	215 lb (98 kg)	So	Dix Hills, New York
35	LHP	Noah Samol	L/L	6 ft 7 in (2.01 m)	250 lb (113 kg)	RS So	Mason, Ohio
36	RHP	Dane Moehler (injured)	R/R	6 ft 2 in (1.88 m)	205 lb (93 kg)	Fr	Marietta, Georgia
37	LHP	Jackson Cole	L/L	6 ft 2 in (1.88 m)	190 lb (86 kg)	RS Fr	Boiling Springs, South Carolina
39	LHP	Ethan Darden	L/L	6 ft 0 in (1.83 m)	175 lb (79 kg)	Jr	Rock Hill, South Carolina
40	INF	Brodey Conn	L/R	6 ft 1 in (1.85 m)	205 lb (93 kg)	RS So	Clemson, South Carolina
41	RHP	Cannon Feazell	R/R	6 ft 1 in (1.85 m)	195 lb (88 kg)	Fr	Windermere, Florida
42	RHP	Michael Gillen	R/R	6 ft 2 in (1.88 m)	220 lb (100 kg)	Jr	Rochelle Park, New Jersey
44	C	Ty Marshall	S/R	5 ft 9 in (1.75 m)	185 lb (84 kg)	So	Cayce, South Carolina
45	RHP	Chayce Kieck	R/R	6 ft 1 in (1.85 m)	185 lb (84 kg)	Fr	Jacksonville, Florida
47	RHP	Lucas Mahlstedt	R/R	6 ft 3 in (1.91 m)	175 lb (79 kg)	Sr	Ormond Beach, Florida
48	INF	Austin Jacobs	R/R	6 ft 0 in (1.83 m)	175 lb (79 kg)	Fr	Geneva, Florida
49	RHP	Chance Fitzgerald	R/R	6 ft 1 in (1.85 m)	215 lb (98 kg)	So	Sanford, Florida
55	OF	Owen Anchors	L/L	6 ft 2 in (1.88 m)	190 lb (86 kg)	Fr	Dunwoody, Georgia
93	RHP	Dion Brown	R/R	5 ft 9 in (1.75 m)	145 lb (66 kg)	Fr	York, South Carolina
96	LHP	Talan Bell	L/L	5 ft 10 in (1.78 m)	180 lb (82 kg)	Fr	Oviedo, Florida
99	INF	Collin Priest	L/R	6 ft 3 in (1.91 m)	245 lb (111 kg)	So	Mount Dora, Florida

Head coach

- Erik Bakich (East Carolina)

Assistant coach(es)

- Jimmy Belanger (Louisville)
- Griffin Mazur (UC Irvine)
- Nick Schnabel (East Carolina)

Legend

- (C) Team captain
- (S) Suspended
- (I) Ineligible
- Injured
- Current redshirt

Roster
Last update: March 30, 2025

== Schedule ==
Legend
	Clemson win
	Clemson loss
	Cancellation
**Bold**	Clemson team member
*	Non-Conference game
†	Make-Up Game

2025 Clemson Tigers baseball game log (45–18)
Regular season (41–15)

February (8–1)
Date	Time (ET)	Opponent	Rank	Site/stadium	Score	Win	Loss	Save	Attendance	Overall record	ACC record
Feb 14	12:00 p.m.	vs. No. 17 Oklahoma State*; Shriners Children's College Showdown	No. 15	Globe Life Field; Arlington, TX	**W** 6–5	**Dvorsky** (1–0)	Wech (0–1)	**Mahlstedt** (1)	8,344	1–0	–
Feb 15	12:00 p.m.	vs. No. 21 Arizona*; Shriners Children's College Showdown	No. 15	Globe Life Field	**W** 16–5	**Titsworth** (1–0)	Kramkowski (0–1)	-	13,289	2–0	–
Feb 16	3:30 p.m.	vs. Ole Miss*; Shriners Children's College Showdown	No. 15	Globe Life Field	**L** 5–15 (7)	McCausland (1–0)	**LeGuernic** (0–1)	None	10,138	2–1	–
Feb 19	4:00 p.m.	Presbyterian*	No. 14	Doug Kingsmore Stadium; Clemson, SC	Postponed due to inclement weather, rescheduled for March 5						
Feb 21	4:00 p.m.	VCU*; Clemson Baseball Invitational	No. 14	Doug Kingsmore Stadium	**W** 6–2	**Knaak** (1–0)	Dressler (0–2)	**Titsworth** (1)	5,091	3–1	–
Feb 22	12:00 p.m.	North Carolina A&T*; Clemson Baseball Invitational	No. 14	Doug Kingsmore Stadium	**W** 12–7	**Dvorsky** (2–0)	Ortiz (1–1)	**Mahlstedt** (2)	4,798	4–1	–
Feb 22	4:00 p.m.	VCU*; Clemson Baseball Invitational	No. 14	Doug Kingsmore Stadium	**W** 4–3	**Darden** (1–0)	Yetter (0–2)	**Garris** (1)	5,173	5–1	–
Feb 23	2:00 p.m.	North Carolina A&T*; Clemson Baseball Invitational	No. 14	Doug Kingsmore Stadium	**W** 4–2	**Allen** (1–0)	Sentell (1–1)	None	4,625	6–1	–
Feb 25	4:00 p.m.	Winthrop*	No. 13	Doug Kingsmore Stadium	**W** 20–7	**Kieck** (1–0)	Wade (0–1)	None	4,803	7–1	–
Feb 28	7:00 p.m.	South Carolina*; Rivalry	No. 13	Doug Kingsmore Stadium	**W** 5–3	**McGovern** (1–0)	Becker (2–1)	**Mahlstedt** (3)	6,891	8–1	–

March (18–4)
Date	Time (ET)	Opponent	Rank	Site/stadium	Score	Win	Loss	Save	Attendance	Overall record	ACC record
Mar 1	1:30 p.m.	vs. South Carolina*; Rivalry	No. 13	Fluor Field; Greenville, SC	**W** 5–1	**Darden** (2–0)	McCoy (1–1)	**Titsworth** (2)	6,983	9–1	–
Mar 2	5:00 p.m.	at South Carolina*; Rivalry	No. 13	Founders Park; Columbia, SC	**W** 8–2	**Allen** (2–0)	Eskew (0–1)	None	8,242	10–1	–
Mar 4	6:00 p.m.	vs. USC Upstate*	No. 11	Fluor Field	**W** 7–0	**Bailey** (1–0)	Bianchini (2–2)	None	2,010	11–1	–
Mar 5 (Note: Originally scheduled for February 19, but delayed due to inclement weather)	4:00 p.m.	Presbyterian*	No. 11	Doug Kingsmore Stadium	**W** 11–2	**Fitzgerald** (1–0)	Williams (0–1)	None	4,129	12–1	–
Mar 7	4:00 p.m.	Davidson*	No. 11	Doug Kingsmore Stadium	**W** 7–4	**Knaak** (2–0)	Wilson (1–3)	**Mahlstedt** (4)	4,931	13–1	–
Mar 8	3:00 p.m.	Davidson*	No. 11	Doug Kingsmore Stadium	**W** 14–4 (7)	**Darden** (3–0)	Fix (1–1)	None	5,287	14–1	–
Mar 9	2:00 p.m.	Davidson*	No. 11	Doug Kingsmore Stadium	**W** 11–4	**Garris** (1–0)	Champey (0–4)	None	4,562	15–1	–
Mar 11	4:00 p.m.	Liberty*	No. 10	Doug Kingsmore Stadium	**W** 6–4	**Bailey** (2–0)	Swink (2–2)	**Mahlstedt** (5)	4,323	16–1	–
Mar 12	4:00 p.m.	Liberty*	No. 10	Doug Kingsmore Stadium	**W** 8–2	**Kieck** (2–0)	Lingenfelter (0–2)	None	4,491	17–1	–
Mar 14	4:00 p.m.	Notre Dame	No. 10	Doug Kingsmore Stadium	**W** 2–1	**Knaak** (3–0)	Radel (1–2)	**Mahlstedt** (6)	4,734	18–1	1–0
Mar 15	3:00 p.m.	Notre Dame	No. 10	Doug Kingsmore Stadium	**W** 11–7	**Dvorsky** (3–0)	Dennies (2–2)	**Garris** (2)	4,812	19–1	2–0
Mar 16	12:00 p.m.	Notre Dame	No. 10	Doug Kingsmore Stadium	**L** 3–7	Van Ameyde (1–0)	**LeGuernic** (0–2)	None	4,356	19–2	2–1
Mar 18	6:00 p.m.	The Citadel*	No. 7	Doug Kingsmore Stadium	**W** 6–4	**Dvorsky** (4–0)	Bland (1–3)	**Mahlstedt** (7)	4,478	20–2	–
Mar 19	6:00 p.m.	The Citadel*	No. 7	Doug Kingsmore Stadium	**W** 11–1 (7)	**Fitzgerald** (2–0)	Davis (1–2)	None	4,415	21–2	–
Mar 21	6:00 p.m.	No. 11 Wake Forest	No. 7	Doug Kingsmore Stadium	**W** 5–1	**Knaak** (4–0)	Lunceford (4–1)	**Mahlstedt** (8)	4,622	22–2	3–1
Mar 22	2:00 p.m.	No. 11 Wake Forest	No. 7	Doug Kingsmore Stadium	**L** 10–12	Schmolke (3–0)	**Darden** (3–1)	Gunther (4)	5,233	22–3	3–2
Mar 23	1:00 p.m.	No. 11 Wake Forest	No. 7	Doug Kingsmore Stadium	**W** 7–6	**Mahlstedt** (1–0)	Gunther (1–2)	None	4,905	23–3	4–2
Mar 25	6:00 p.m.	Coastal Carolina*	No. 6	Doug Kingsmore Stadium	**L** 2–8	Ellison (1–1)	**Samol** (0–1)	None	5,043	23–4	–
Mar 26	6:00 p.m.	Presbyterian*	No. 6	Doug Kingsmore Stadium	**W** 9–1	**Fitzgerald** (3–0)	Gibson (0–1)	None	4,864	24–4	–
Mar 28	6:00 p.m.	at No. 25 Georgia Tech	No. 6	Russ Chandler Stadium; Atlanta, GA	**W** 9–7	**Mahlstedt** (2–0)	Patel (7–1)	None	2,911	25–4	5–2
Mar 29 (DH 1)	4:00 p.m.	at No. 25 Georgia Tech	No. 6	Russ Chandler Stadium	**L** 2–18 (7)	Jones (3–0)	**Darden** (3–2)	None	—	25–5	5–3
Mar 29 (DH 2)	7:30 p.m.	at No. 25 Georgia Tech	No. 6	Russ Chandler Stadium	**W** 4–3	**Garris** (2–0)	Gaudette (0–1)	None	3,639	26–5	6–3

April (10–5)
Date	Time (ET)	Opponent	Rank	Site/stadium	Score	Win	Loss	Save	Attendance	Overall record	ACC record
Apr 1	6:30 p.m.	vs. Georgia Southern*	No. 6	SRP Park; North Augusta, SC	**W** 10–8	**Allen** (3–0)	Burke (0–1)	**Mahlstedt** (9)	5,832	27–5	–
Apr 4	9:00 p.m.	at California	No. 6	Evans Diamond; Berkeley, CA	**W** 6–4	**Knaak** (5–0)	Turkington (4–3)	**Mahlstedt** (10)	1,163	28–5	7–3
Apr 5	5:00 p.m.	at California	No. 6	Evans Diamond	**W** 13–3 (7)	**Darden** (4–2)	Eddy (2–2)	None	1,224	29–5	8–3
Apr 6	4:00 p.m.	at California	No. 6	Evans Diamond	**W** 4–3	**Titsworth** (2–0)	Tremain (4–2)	**Mahlstedt** (11)	1,352	30–5	9–3
Apr 9	7:00 p.m.	Gardner–Webb*	No. 4	Doug Kingsmore Stadium	**W** 4–2	**Titsworth** (3–0)	Guzman (1–3)	None	5,097	31–5	–
Apr 11	6:00 p.m.	Stanford	No. 4	Doug Kingsmore Stadium	**W** 11–1 (7)	**Knaak** (6–0)	Volchko (2–2)	None	4,982	32–5	10–3
Apr 12	6:00 p.m.	Stanford	No. 4	Doug Kingsmore Stadium	**W** 11–10	**Garris** (3–0)	Garewal (0–1)	**Mahlstedt** (12)	5,326	33–5	11–3
Apr 13	3:00 p.m.	Stanford	No. 4	Doug Kingsmore Stadium	**L** 6–11	Scott (5–2)	**Bailey** (2–1)	None	4,765	33–6	11–4
Apr 17	7:00 p.m.	No. 17 Louisville	No. 3	Doug Kingsmore Stadium	**W** 7–6	**McGovern** (2–0)	Danilowicz (0–1)	**Mahlstedt** (13)	4,943	34–6	12–4
Apr 18	7:00 p.m.	No. 17 Louisville	No. 3	Doug Kingsmore Stadium	**W** 2–1	**Titsworth** (4–0)	Eberle (3–1)	**Mahlstedt** (14)	5,237	35–6	13–4
Apr 19	2:00 p.m.	No. 17 Louisville	No. 3	Doug Kingsmore Stadium	**L** 6–8 (12)	Schweitzer (2–0)	**LeGuernic** (0–3)	None	5,026	35–7	13–5
Apr 22	6:00 p.m.	No. 10 Georgia*	No. 2	Doug Kingsmore Stadium	**W** 3–0	**McGovern** (3–0)	Goldstein (0–2)	**Mahlstedt** (15)	6,584	36–7	–
Apr 24	7:00 p.m.	at No. 25 NC State	No. 2	Doak Field; Raleigh, NC	**L** 4–14 (8)	Nance (7–1)	**Knaak** (6–1)	None	3,048	36–8	13–6
Apr 25	6:00 p.m.	at No. 25 NC State	No. 2	Doak Field	**L** 3–8	Andrews (4–2)	**Titsworth** (4–1)	Shaffner (1)	3,048	36–9	13–7
Apr 26	1:00 p.m.	at No. 25 NC State	No. 2	Doak Field	**L** 1–4	Marohn (6–2)	**Bailey** (2–2)	Dudan (1)	3,048	36–10	13–8

May (5–5)
Date	Time (ET)	Opponent	Rank	Site/stadium	Score	Win	Loss	Save	Attendance	Overall record	ACC record
May 2	6:00 p.m.	at No. 5 Florida State	No. 3	Dick Howser Stadium; Tallahassee, FL	**L** 5–6 (11)	Prescott (4–0)	**Bailey** (2–3)	None	6,700	36–11	13–9
May 3	6:00 p.m.	at No. 5 Florida State	No. 3	Dick Howser Stadium	**W** 6–3	**Fitzgerald** (4–0)	Volini (8–2)	**Garris** (3)	6,700	37–11	14–9
May 4	2:00 p.m.	at No. 5 Florida State	No. 3	Dick Howser Stadium	**L** 9–20 (8)	Charles (2–0)	**Bell** (0–1)	None	5,542	37–12	14–10
May 6	6:00 p.m.	at No. 14 Coastal Carolina*	No. 9	Springs Brooks Stadium; Conway, SC	**L** 3–5	Horn (4–1)	**Gillen** (0–1)	Lynch (4)	5,300	37–13	–
May 9	6:00 p.m.	Duke	No. 9	Doug Kingsmore Stadium	**W** 9–7	**Knaak** (7–1)	Proksch (2–2)	None	4,975	38–13	15–10
May 10	2:00 p.m.	Duke	No. 9	Doug Kingsmore Stadium	**L** 10–15	Easterly (8–1)	**McGovern** (3–1)	None	4,962	38–14	15–11
May 11	1:00 p.m.	Duke	No. 9	Doug Kingsmore Stadium	**L** 4–8	Zatkowski (5–1)	**Bailey** (2–4)	None	4,547	38–15	15–12
May 15	6:00 p.m.	at Pittsburgh	No. 15	Cost Field; Pittsburgh, PA	**W** 6–1	**Knaak** (8–1)	Gardner (4–5)	None	710	39–15	16–12
May 16	3:00 p.m.	at Pittsburgh	No. 15	Cost Field	**W** 11–2	**Titsworth** (5–1)	Demi (0–3)	**McGovern** (1)	665	40–15	17–12
May 17	1:00 p.m.	at Pittsburgh	No. 15	Cost Field	**W** 13–6	**Allen** (3–0)	Coleman (2–2)	None	733	41–15	18–12

Postseason (4–3)

ACC Tournament (3–1)
Date	Time	Opponent	Seed/Rank	Site/stadium	Score	Win	Loss	Save	Attendance	Overall record	Tournament record
May 21	1:00 p.m.	vs. (12) Virginia Tech	(5)/No. 14	Durham Bulls Athletic Park; Durham, NC	**W** 6–1	**Knaak** (9–1)	Renfrow (3–7)	None	2,535	42–15	1–0
May 22	7:00 p.m.	vs. (4)/No. 22 NC State	(5)/No. 14	Durham Bulls Athletic Park; Durham, NC	**W** 7–6	**Mahlstedt** (3–0)	Nance (8–2)	None	4,866	43–15	2–0
May 24	1:00 p.m.	vs. (1)/No. 16 Georgia Tech	(5)/No. 14	Durham Bulls Athletic Park; Durham, NC	**W** 9–4	**Allen** (5–0)	Jones (7–3)	**McGovern** (2)	5,118	44–15	3–0
May 25	12:00 p.m.	vs. (3)/No. 3 North Carolina	(5)/No. 14	Durham Bulls Athletic Park; Durham, NC	**L** 4–14	Johnson (2–0)	**Bailey** (2–5)	None	9,159	44–16	3–1

NCAA Tournament Clemson Regional (1–2)
Date	Time	Opponent	Seed/Rank	Site/stadium	Score	Win	Loss	Save	Attendance	Overall record	Regional record
May 30	7:30 p.m.	USC Upstate	(11) No. 14	Doug Kingsmore Stadium	**W** 7–3	**Mahlstedt** (4–0)	Ellingworth (1–2)	None	6,046	45–16	1–0
May 31	6:00 p.m.	West Virginia	(11) No. 14	Doug Kingsmore Stadium	**L** 6–9	Meyer (9–2)	**Mahlstedt** (4–1)	McDougal (2)	6,475	45–17	1–1
June 1	12:00 p.m.	Kentucky	(11) No. 14	Doug Kingsmore Stadium	**L** 4–16	N. Harris (5–2)	**Bell** (0–2)	None	5,492	45–18	1–2

Note: All rankings shown are from D1Baseball Poll.

== Rankings ==
Ranking movements Legend: ██ Increase in ranking ██ Decrease in ranking т = Tied with team above or below
	Week																
Poll	Pre	1	2	3	4	5	6	7	8	9	10	11	12	13	14	15	Final
Coaches'	11	11*	9	7т	6	6	5	7	5	4	2	4	9	13	12	12	20
Baseball America	8	8	7	5	5	7	7	7	5	6	2	6	12	17	14	14*	24
NCBWA†	9	8	10	10	8	7	4	7	4	2	2	2	6	9	13	11	22
D1Baseball	15	14	13	11	10	7	6	6	4	3	2	3	9	15	14	14	23
Perfect Game	8	8	7	4	4	4	3	4	3	2	2	8	10	15	12	12*	21

† NCBWA ranks 30 teams in their preseason poll, but only ranks 25 teams weekly during the season.
* A new poll was not released for this week, so for comparison purposes, the previous week's ranking is inserted in this week's slot.
