= 1992 NAIA World Series =

1992 NAIA baseball tournament
- 1992 NAIA World Series
- Teams: 8
- Format: Double elimination Page playoff
- Finals site: Sec Taylor Stadium; Des Moines, Iowa
- Champions: Lewis–Clark State (8th title)
- Winning coach: Ed Cheff
- MVP: Mike Meggers (OF) (Mary Hardin–Baylor)

The 1992 NAIA World Series was the 36th annual tournament hosted by the National Association of Intercollegiate Athletics to determine the national champion of baseball among its member colleges and universities in the United States and Canada.

After eight seasons in Lewiston, Idaho, this tournament was played at Sec Taylor Stadium in Des Moines, Iowa.

Five-time defending champions Lewis–Clark State (55–10) defeated Mary Hardin–Baylor (40–18) in a single-game championship series, 14–4, to win the Warriors' eighth NAIA World Series. This would go on to be the sixth of six consecutive World Series championships for the program.

Mary Hardin–Baylor outfielder Mike Meggers was named tournament MVP.

== Bracket ==
=== Preliminary ===
First round Losers to Championship Bracket, Second Round
Auburn Montgomery	5
Mount Olive	4
Oklahoma City	17
Wilmington (DE)	0
Mary Hardin–Baylor	8
Spring Arbor	5
Lewis–Clark State	20
Winona State	0

Second round Losers to Championship Bracket, Third Round
Auburn Montgomery	4
Oklahoma City	5
Mary Hardin–Baylor	3
Lewis–Clark State	4

Third round Both teams to Championship Bracket, Semifinals
Oklahoma City	3
Lewis–Clark State	12

=== Championship ===
Second round
Spring Arbor	4
Winona State	5
Mount Olive	0
Wilmington (DE)	6

Third round
Auburn Montgomery	4
Winona State	6
Mary Hardin–Baylor	6
Wilmington (DE)	5

Semifinals
Lewis–Clark State	8
Winona State	1
Oklahoma City	7
Mary Hardin–Baylor	8

Championship
Lewis–Clark State	14
Mary Hardin–Baylor	4

== See also ==
- 1992 NCAA Division I baseball tournament
- 1992 NCAA Division II baseball tournament
- 1992 NCAA Division III baseball tournament
- 1992 NAIA Softball World Series
