= 2025 The Citadel Bulldogs baseball team =

American college baseball season

2025 The Citadel Bulldogs baseball
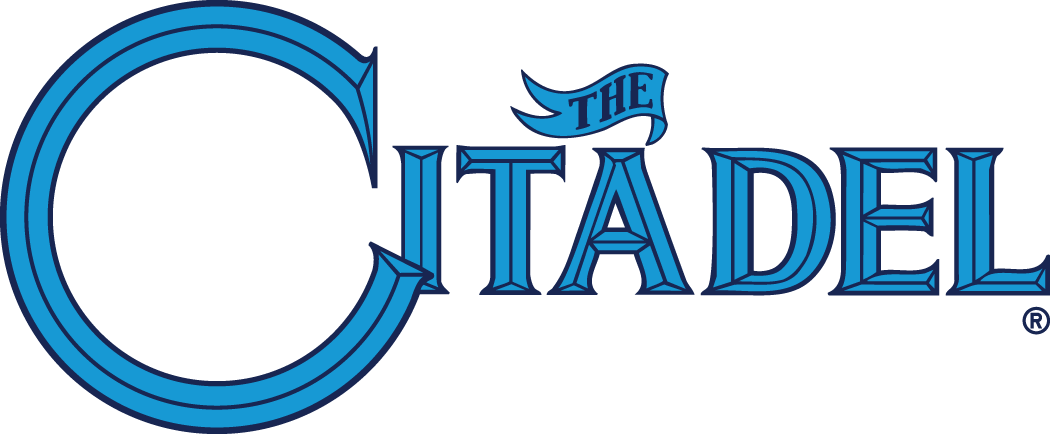
- Conference: Southern Conference
- Record: 31–26 (12–9 SoCon)
- Head coach: Russell Triplett (1st season)
- Hitting coach: David Beckley (1st season)
- Pitching coach: James Reeves (1st season)
- Home stadium: Joseph P. Riley Jr. Park

2025 Southern Conference baseball standings
| | Conf. | | | | Overall |
| Team | W | | L | PCT | W | | L | PCT |
|---|---|---|---|---|---|---|---|---|
| East Tennessee State ‍†‍‡‍^{y} | 14 | – | 7 | .667 | 41 | – | 17 | .707 |
| Samford ‍‍‍ | 13 | – | 8 | .619 | 30 | – | 27 | .526 |
| The Citadel ‍‍‍ | 12 | – | 9 | .571 | 31 | – | 26 | .544 |
| Mercer ‍‍‍ | 12 | – | 9 | .571 | 35 | – | 25 | .583 |
| Western Carolina ‍‍‍ | 10 | – | 11 | .476 | 30 | – | 28 | .517 |
| UNC Greensboro ‍‍‍ | 9 | – | 12 | .429 | 21 | – | 33 | .389 |
| Wofford ‍‍‍ | 8 | – | 13 | .381 | 33 | – | 27 | .550 |
| VMI ‍‍‍ | 6 | – | 15 | .286 | 27 | – | 26 | .509 |
† – Conference champion ‡ – Tournament champion y – Invited to the NCAA tournament As of May 31, 2025; Rankings from D1Baseball

2025 The Citadel Bulldogs baseball team represented The Citadel in the 2025 NCAA Division I baseball season. The Bulldogs played their home games at Joseph P. Riley Jr. Park in Charleston, South Carolina. The team was coached by Russell Triplett, in his 1st season at The Citadel.

The Bulldogs completed the regular season with a 12–9 conference record, good for third place on the SoCon. The team won 30 games for the first time since 2013. They finished 1–2 in the SoCon Tournament.

== Previous season ==
The Bulldogs finished 21–32 overall, and 3–18 in the Southern Conference in 2024. Head coach Tony Skole was not retained after the season.

== Personnel ==
=== Roster ===
2025 The Citadel Bulldogs baseball roster
| Pitchers: 7 - Ben Brash - Sophomore; 9 - Maddox Webb - Sophomore; 10 - Conner Cummiskey - Graduate Student; 13 - George Derrick Floyd - Senior; 14 - Chandler Anderson - Junior; 17 - Fisher Paulsen - Senior; 23 - Will Holmes - Senior; 24 - Oliver Wood - Junior; 25 - Manning Burgess - Freshman; 28 - Anthony Hausner - Junior; 29 - Aryan Patel - Junior; 33 - CJ Van Slooten - Junior; 35 - Zane Davis - Junior; 36 - Andrew Stanley - Senior; 37 - Nathan Landeck - Freshman; 42 - Matthew Polk - Senior; 44 - Yates Bland - Junior; 55 - Jack Thunberg - Senior | Catchers: 4 - Garrett Fulmer - Sophomore; 21 - Phillips Daniels - Junior; 31 - Noah Cadiz - Redshirt Sophomore; Infielders: 1 - Lane Tobin - Senior; 6 - Landon Kahl - Sophomore; 8 - Garrett Dill - Senior; 19 - Robbie Lane - Junior; 20 - Travis Elliott - Graduate Student; 38 - McKane Cantrell - Freshman | Outfielders: 2 - Thomas Rollauer - Senior; 3 - Tyler Christmas - Redshirt Junior; 12 - Cole Canty - Freshman; 16 - Maddox Floyd - Freshman; 18 - Matthew Lively - Junior; 22 - Chase Loggins - Senior; 30 - Rhyder Poppell - Freshman; Utility: 32 - TJ Anderson - Junior |

=== Coaches ===
2025 The Citadel Bulldogs baseball coaching staff
- Russell Triplett – Head coach – 1st year
- David Beckley – Assistant coach – 17th year
- James Reeves – Assistant coach (Pitching) – 1st year

== Schedule ==
Legend
| | The Citadel win |
| | The Citadel loss |
| | Cancellation |
| **Bold** | The Citadel team member |
| * | Non-Conference game |

2025 The Citadel Bulldogs baseball game log
Regular season

February
| Date | Opponent | Site/Stadium | Score | Win | Loss | Save | Attendance | Overall Record | SoCon Record |
|---|---|---|---|---|---|---|---|---|---|
| Feb 14 | UIC* | Joseph P. Riley Jr. Park • Charleston, SC | **W** 9–1 | **Holmes (1–0)** | Schueler (0–1) | **Stanley (1)** | 457 | 1–0 | |
| Feb 15 | Miami (OH)* | Joseph P. Riley Jr. Park • Charleston, SC | **L** 5–8 | Benko (1–0) | **Davis (0–1)** | Mastrian IV (1) | 577 | 1–1 | |
| Feb 15 | Miami (OH)* | Joseph P. Riley Jr. Park • Charleston, SC | **L** 1–16 | Katskee (1–0) | **Brash (0–1)** | None | 577 (DH) | 1–2 | |
| Feb 17 | UIC* | Joseph P. Riley Jr. Park • Charleston, SC | **W** 10–4 | **Webb (1–0)** | Gould (0–1) | None | 439 | 2–2 | |
| Feb 21 | Maine* | Joseph P. Riley Jr. Park • Charleston, SC | **L** 2–4 | Fitzgerald (1–1) | **Stanley (0–1)** | Lavigueur (1) | 349 | 2–3 | |
| Feb 22 | Maine* | Joseph P. Riley Jr. Park • Charleston, SC | **L** 2–6 | Holt (1–1) | **Bland (0–1)** | None | 521 | 2–4 | |
| Feb 23 | Maine* | Joseph P. Riley Jr. Park • Charleston, SC | **W** 10–3 | **Brash (1–1)** | Gifford (0–1) | None | 405 | 3–4 | |
| Feb 25 | Presbyterian* | Joseph P. Riley Jr. Park • Charleston, SC | **W** 4–2 | **Davis (1–1)** | Harrell (0–1) | **Hausner (1)** | 269 | 4–4 | |
| Feb 28 | Yale* | Joseph P. Riley Jr. Park • Charleston, SC | **W** 2–0 | **Holmes (2–0)** | Shaw (1–1) | **Anderson (1)** | 835 | 5–4 | |

March
| Date | Opponent | Site/Stadium | Score | Win | Loss | Save | Attendance | Overall Record | SoCon Record |
|---|---|---|---|---|---|---|---|---|---|
| Mar 1 | Yale* | Joseph P. Riley Jr. Park • Charleston, SC | **W** 2–0 | **Yates (1–1)** | Cohen (0–1) | **Hausner (2)** | 619 | 6–4 | |
| Mar 2 | Yale* | Joseph P. Riley Jr. Park • Charleston, SC | **W** 6–2 | **Stanley (1–1)** | Lewis (1–1) | None | 433 | 7–4 | |
| Mar 5 | South Carolina* | Joseph P. Riley Jr. Park • Charleston, SC | **L** 1–9 | Evans Jr. (2–0) | **Paulsen (0–1)** | None | 4,937 | 7–5 | |
| Mar 7 | Northwestern* | Joseph P. Riley Jr. Park • Charleston, SC | **W** 4–2 | **Holmes (3–0)** | Wade (1–2) | **Hausner (3)** | 507 | 8–5 | |
| Mar 8 | Northwestern* | Joseph P. Riley Jr. Park • Charleston, SC | **W** 5–4 | **Webb (2–0)** | Kouser (2–1) | None | 609 | 9–5 | |
| Mar 8 | Northwestern* | Joseph P. Riley Jr. Park • Charleston, SC | **L** 1–4 | Hlibocki (1–1) | **Bland (1–2)** | Macmillan (2) | 651 | 9–6 | |
| Mar 9 | Northwestern* | Joseph P. Riley Jr. Park • Charleston, SC | **L** 7–10 | Fornis (1–0) | **Brash (1–2)** | Grant (1) | 417 | 9–7 | |
| Mar 11 | at Presbyterian* | Presbyterian Baseball Complex • Clinton, SC | **W** 11–3 | **Wood (1–0)** | Saint (1–1) | None | 235 | 10–7 | |
| Mar 12 | Charleston Southern* | Joseph P. Riley Jr. Park • Charleston, SC | **L** 3–13 | Lewis (1–0) | **Brash (1–3)** | None | 519 | 10–8 | |
| Mar 14 | Kennesaw State* | Joseph P. Riley Jr. Park • Charleston, SC | **W** 4–3 | **Webb (3–0)** | Renfroe (2–1) | None | 427 | 11–8 | |
| Mar 15 | Kennesaw State* | Joseph P. Riley Jr. Park • Charleston, SC | **L** 4–9 | Pinson (2–0) | **Hausner (0–1)** | None | 689 | 11–9 | |
| Mar 16 | Kennesaw State* | Joseph P. Riley Jr. Park • Charleston, SC | Canceled | | | | | | |
| Mar 18 | at No. 7 Clemson* | Doug Kingsmore Stadium • Clemson, SC | **L** 4–6 | Dvorsky (4–0) | **Bland (1–3)** | Mahlstedt (7) | 4,478 | 11–10 | |
| Mar 19 | at No. 7 Clemson* | Doug Kingsmore Stadium • Clemson, SC | **L** 1–11 | Fitzgerald (2–0) | **Davis (1–2)** | None | 4,415 | 11–11 | |
| Mar 21 | Mercer | Joseph P. Riley Jr. Park • Charleston, SC | **W** 6–5 | **Hausner (1–1)** | Ackerman (1–2) | None | 393 | 12–11 | 1–0 |
| Mar 22 | Mercer | Joseph P. Riley Jr. Park • Charleston, SC | **W** 8–0 | **Floyd (1–0)** | Kersey (1–2) | **Bland (1)** | 679 | 13–11 | 2–0 |
| Mar 23 | Mercer | Joseph P. Riley Jr. Park • Charleston, SC | **L** 7–9 | Busse (1–0) | **Hausner (1–2)** | None | 415 | 13–12 | 2–1 |
| Mar 25 | Charleston* | Joseph P. Riley Jr. Park • Charleston, SC | **W** 4–2 | **Davis (2–2)** | Thomas (1–0) | **Hausner (4)** | 1,029 | 14–12 | |
| Mar 28 | Wofford | Joseph P. Riley Jr. Park • Charleston, SC | **L** 3–14^{7} | Little (4–2) | **Stanley (1–2)** | None | 523 | 14–13 | 2–2 |
| Mar 29 | Wofford | Joseph P. Riley Jr. Park • Charleston, SC | **L** 0–7 | Condon (1–0) | **Floyd (1–1)** | None | 581 | 14–14 | 2–3 |
| Mar 30 | Wofford | Joseph P. Riley Jr. Park • Charleston, SC | **W** 7–1 | **Anderson (1–0)** | Rasmussen (2–1) | **Webb (1)** | 555 | 15–14 | 3–3 |

April
| Date | Opponent | Site/Stadium | Score | Win | Loss | Save | Attendance | Overall Record | SoCon Record |
|---|---|---|---|---|---|---|---|---|---|
| Apr 2 | at Winthrop* | Winthrop Ballpark • Rock Hill, SC | **W** 7–5 | **Wood (2–0)** | Brodt (1–3) | **Webb (2)** | 1,006 | 16–14 | |
| Apr 4 | at Western Michigan* | Hyames Field • Kalamazoo, MI | **W** 7–4 | **Stanley (2–2)** | McKinstry (1–6) | **Van Slooten (1)** | 273 | 17–14 | |
| Apr 5 | at Western Michigan* | Hyames Field • Kalamazoo, MI | Canceled | | | | | | |
| Apr 5 | at Western Michigan* | Hyames Field • Kalamazoo, MI | **W** 11–3 | **Floyd (2–1)** | Wizceb (2–5) | **Brash (1)** | 178 | 18–14 | |
| Apr 6 | at Western Michigan* | Hyames Field • Kalamazoo, MI | **L** 0–6 | Gaber (2–3) | **Anderson (1–1)** | None | 121 | 18–15 | |
| Apr 11 | at Samford | Joe Lee Griffin Stadium • Birmingham, AL | **L** 8–9 | Steckmesser (3–1) | **Bland (1–4)** | None | 317 | 18–16 | 3–4 |
| Apr 12 | at Samford | Joe Lee Griffin Stadium • Birmingham, AL | **W** 4–3 | **Floyd (3–1)** | Leersson (1–2) | **Hausner (5)** | 413 | 19–16 | 4–4 |
| Apr 13 | at Samford | Joe Lee Griffin Stadium • Birmingham, AL | **L** 5–8 | Blasche (5–0) | **Anderson (1–2)** | None | 377 | 19–17 | 4–5 |
| Apr 15 | at South Carolina* | Founders Park • Columbia, SC | **L** 0–4 | Pitzer (4–0) | **Cummiskey (0–1)** | None | 7,214 | 19–18 | |
| Apr 16 | at Charleston* | CofC Baseball Stadium at Patriots Point • Mount Pleasant, SC | **L** 2–5 | Lyon (6–1) | **Floyd** (3–2) | Aiken (7) | 821 | 19–19 | |
| Apr 22 | Charleston Southern* | Joseph P. Riley Jr. Park • Charleston, SC | **W** 3–1 | **Wood** (3–0) | Chalfant (3–3) | **Webb** (3) | 543 | 20–19 | |
| Apr 25 | VMI | Joseph P. Riley Jr. Park • Charleston, SC | **W** 5–0 | **Stanley** (3–2) | Spiegel (0–2) | **Webb** (4) | 817 | 21–19 | 5–5 |
| Apr 26 | VMI | Joseph P. Riley Jr. Park • Charleston, SC | **W** 4–2 | **Floyd** (4–2) | Hawley (1–1) | **Bland** (2) | 953 | 22–19 | 6–5 |
| Apr 27 | VMI | Joseph P. Riley Jr. Park • Charleston, SC | **W** 11–8 | **Bland** (2–4) | Plummer (4–3) | None | 591 | 23–19 | 7–5 |

May
| Date | Opponent | Site/Stadium | Score | Win | Loss | Save | Attendance | Overall Record | SoCon Record |
|---|---|---|---|---|---|---|---|---|---|
| May 2 | at UNC Greensboro | UNCG Baseball Stadium • Greensboro, NC | **W** 8–7 | **Webb** (4–0) | Thompson Jr. (2–2) | None | 168 | 24–19 | 8–5 |
| May 4 | at UNC Greensboro | UNCG Baseball Stadium • Greensboro, NC | **W** 8–7 | **Stanley (4–2)** | Miller (2–5) | **Hausner (6)** | 465 | 25–19 | 9–5 |
| May 4 | at UNC Greensboro | UNCG Baseball Stadium • Greensboro, NC | **L** 3–18^{7} | Chapman (5–1) | **Anderson (1–3)** | None | 465 | 25–20 | 9–6 |
| May 6 | at College of Charleston* | CofC Baseball Stadium at Patriots Point • Mount Pleasant, SC | **L** 1–14^{7} | Eggert (2–1) | **Bland (2–5)** | None' | 755 | 25–21 | |
| May 7 | Winthrop* | Joseph P. Riley Jr. Park • Charleston, SC | **W** 6–3 | **Hausner (2–2)** | Tompkins (2–2) | **Webb (5)** | 231 | 26–21 | |
| May 9 | at Western Carolina | Hennon Stadium • Cullowhee, NC | **L** 4–11 | Revis (5–5) | **Floyd (4–3)** | None | 768 | 26–22 | 9–7 |
| May 10 | at Western Carolina | Hennon Stadium • Cullowhee, NC | **L** 2–15^{7} | Wright (4–6) | **Webb (4–1)** | None | 689 | 26–23 | 9–8 |
| May 11 | at Western Carolina | Hennon Stadium • Cullowhee, NC | **W** 9–7 | **Bland (3–5)** | Langley (2–1) | None | 732 | 27–23 | 10–8 |
| May 13 | at Charleston Southern* | Buccaneer Ballpark • North Charleston, SC | **W** 15–8 | **Wood (4–0)** | Chalfant (4–4) | None | 187 | 28–23 | |
| May 15 | East Tennessee State | Joseph P. Riley Jr. Park • Charleston, SC | **W** 7–3 | **Floyd (5–3)** | Fink (6–4) | None | 435 | 29–23 | 11–8 |
| May 16 | East Tennessee State | Joseph P. Riley Jr. Park • Charleston, SC | **W** 7–3 | **Stanley (5–2)** | McCarley (3–1) | None | 521 | 30–23 | 12–8 |
| May 17 | East Tennessee State | Joseph P. Riley Jr. Park • Charleston, SC | **L** 2–11 | Frederick (7–1) | **Hausner (2–3)** | None | 857 | 30–24 | 12–9 |

Post-Season

SoCon Tournament
| Date | Opponent | Seed | Site/Stadium | Score | Win | Loss | Save | Attendance | Overall Record | SoConT Record |
|---|---|---|---|---|---|---|---|---|---|---|
| May 22 | (7) Wofford | (3) | Fluor Field at the West End • Greenville, SC | **L** 4–12 | Michaels (5–3) | **Stanley (5–3)** | None | 1,019 | 30–25 | 1–0 |
| May 23 | (5) Western Carolina | (3) | Fluor Field at the West End • Greenville, SC | **W** 11–10 | **Floyd (6–3)** | Ossiander (3–2) | None | 711 | 31–25 | 1–1 |
| May 24 | (4) Mercer | (3) | Fluor Field at the West End • Greenville, SC | **L** 2–4 | Busse (4–2) | **Hausner (2–4)** | Ewaldsen (4) | 716 | 31–26 | 1–2 |
