= Fred Koster =

American baseball player (1905–1979)

- Outfielder
- Born: December 21, 1905; Louisville, Kentucky, U.S.
- Died: April 24, 1979 (aged 73); St. Matthews, Kentucky, U.S.
- Batted: Left Threw: Left

MLB debut
- April 27, 1931, for the Philadelphia Phillies

Last MLB appearance
- September 27, 1931, for the Philadelphia Phillies

MLB statistics
- Batting average: .225
- Home runs: 0
- Runs batted in: 8
- Stats at Baseball Reference

Teams
- Philadelphia Phillies (1931)

Frederick Charles Koster ["Fritz"] (December 21, 1905 – April 24, 1979) was an American outfielder in Major League Baseball who played for the Philadelphia Phillies during the 1931 season.

Koster attended the University of Louisville, where he played college baseball for the Cardinals from 1926 to 1928.
