= Lelo Prado =

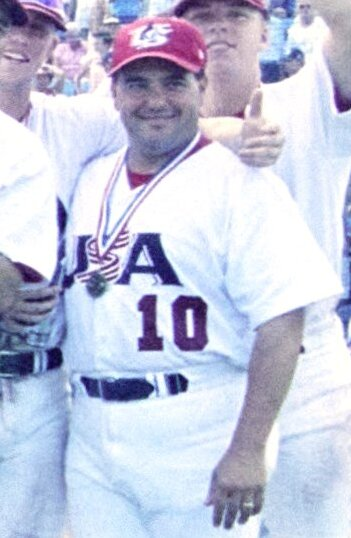
- Prado with the United States national collegiate baseball team in 2002

Biographical details
- Born: November 5, 1962 (age 63); Havana, Cuba
- Education: Hillsborough Community College; University of Tampa

Playing career
- 1982–1983: Hillsborough CC
- 1984–1985: Tampa
- Position: Catcher

Coaching career (HC unless noted)
- 1985: Hillsborough CC (asst.)
- 1986–1988: Tampa (asst.)
- 1989–1995: Tampa
- 1996–2006: Louisville
- 2007–2014: South Florida

Head coaching record
- Overall: 849–639–2
- Tournaments: DI: 0–2

Accomplishments and honors

Championships
- 2 Sunshine State Conference Titles (1989, 1993); 7 Division II NCAA tournament Appearances (1989, 1990, 1991, 1992, 1993, 1994, 1995); 3 Division II College World Series appearances (1990, 1992, 1993); 2 Division II National Championships (1992, 1993); 1 NCAA tournament Appearance (2002)

Awards
- C-USA Coach of the Year (2002); Big East Coach of the Year (2009)

Lelo Prado (born November 5, 1962) is the former head baseball coach at the University of South Florida. Hired in 2006, he guided the Bulls to a 36–24 record in his inaugural season. In 24 years as a collegiate coach, he has posted a 763–580–2 record. He led the Bulls to a 9–0 start in 2006, and South Florida was ranked 30th in the nation for that week. Prado left the position following the 2014 season. He is now a deputy athletic director at South Florida.

Prior to coaching at USF, he served as the head coach 11 seasons at the University of Louisville. Prado also coached for seven seasons at the University of Tampa, where he won two Division II national championships, in 1992 and 1993. In 2002, he took Louisville to its first ever NCAA tournament appearance, and earned Conference USA coach of the year honors. He had seven 30-win seasons at Louisville, also a school record.

== Head coaching record ==
Record table
Season	Team	Overall	Conference	Standing	Postseason
Tampa Spartans (Sunshine State Conference (Division II)) (1989–1995)
1989	Tampa	37–18–1	18–6	T–1st	NCAA Regional
1990	Tampa	45–14	15–9	3rd	College World Series
1991	Tampa	34–17	17–7	2nd	NCAA Regional
1992	Tampa	42–19	18–6	2nd	College World Series
1993	Tampa	43–21	21–3	1st	College World Series
1994	Tampa	36–18	14–7	3rd	NCAA Regional
1995	Tampa	41–17	14–7	3rd	NCAA Regional
Tampa:		278–124–1	117–45		
Louisville Cardinals (Conference USA) (1996–2005)
1996	Louisville	18–36	6–15	8th	
1997	Louisville	23–32	11–15	7th	
1998	Louisville	31–24	14–13	5th	
1999	Louisville	37–19	14–13	6th	
2000	Louisville	17–37–1	10–16–1	8th	
2001	Louisville	32–29	13–14	T–5th	
2002	Louisville	39–18	21–9	2nd	NCAA Regional
2003	Louisville	34–23	14–15	7th	
2004	Louisville	26–30	13–17	8th	
2005	Louisville	32–24	15–14	T–6th	
Louisville Cardinals (Big East Conference) (2006–2006)
2006	Louisville	31–29	17–10	3rd	
Louisville:		320–301–1	148–151–1		
South Florida Bulls (Big East Conference) (2007–2013)
2007	South Florida	34–26	13–14	5th	
2008	South Florida	31–27	14–13	6th	
2009	South Florida	34–25	18–9	2nd	
2010	South Florida	26–32	16–11	T–4th	
2011	South Florida	25–29	13–14	9th	
2012	South Florida	38–22	17–10	T–3rd	
2013	South Florida	36–22	17–7	4th	
South Florida Bulls (American Athletic Conference) (2014)
2014	South Florida	27–31	10–14	5th	
South Florida:		251–214	118–92		
Total:		849–639–2			
National champion Postseason invitational champion Conference regular season champion Conference regular season and conference tournament champion Division regular season champion Division regular season and conference tournament champion Conference tournament champion
