= 1992 NCAA Division II softball tournament =

- Format: Double-elimination tournament
- Finals site: Shawnee, Kansas
- Champions: Missouri Southern State (1st title)
- Runner-up: Cal State Hayward (1st title game)
- Winning coach: Pat Lipira (1st title)
- Attendance: 2,827

The 1992 NCAA Division II softball tournament was the 11th annual postseason tournament hosted by the NCAA to determine the national champion of softball among its Division II members in the United States, held at the end of the 1992 NCAA Division II softball season.

The final, four-team double elimination tournament, also known as the Division II Women's College World Series, was played in Shawnee, Kansas.

Emerging from the winner's bracket, Missouri Southern State and defeated Cal State Hayward in the first game of the double elimination championship series, 1–0, to capture the Lions' first Division II national title.

== Bracket ==
=== Finals ===
First rounds
Bloomsburg	3
Cal State Hayward	0
Missouri Southern State	6
Saginaw Valley State	1
Cal State Hayward	11
Saginaw Valley State	0
Consolation bracket

Semifinals
Bloomsburg	0
Missouri Southern State	1
Bloomsburg	3
Cal State Hayward	4

Championship series
Missouri Southern State	1
Cal State Hayward	0

== All-tournament team ==
- Stacy Harter, 1B, Missouri Southern State
- Char Rector, 2B, Cal State Hayward
- Charlotte Wiley, SS, Cal State Hayward
- Sharla Snow, 3B, Missouri Southern State
- Carrie Carter, OF, Missouri Southern State
- Robyn Crispi, OF, Cal State Hayward
- Amy Circo, OF, Cal State Hayward
- Andrea Clarke, P, Missouri Southern State
- Leslie Johnson, P, Cal State Hayward
- Marty Laudato, C, Bloomsburg
- Diane Miller, AL, Missouri Southern State
- Katrina Marshall, AL, Missouri Southern State

== See also ==
- 1992 NCAA Division I softball tournament
- 1992 NCAA Division III softball tournament
- 1992 NAIA softball tournament
- 1992 NCAA Division II baseball tournament
