= 2024 Louisville Cardinals baseball team =

American college baseball season

2024 Louisville Cardinals baseball
- Conference: Atlantic Coast Conference
- Record: 32–24 (16–14 ACC)
- Head coach: Dan McDonnell (18th season)
- Assistant coaches: Roger Williams (18th season); Eric Snider (10th season); Adam Vrable (10th season)
- Home stadium: Jim Patterson Stadium

2024 Atlantic Coast Conference baseball standings
	Conf.				Overall
Team	W		L	PCT	W		L	PCT
Atlantic
No. 9 Clemson ^{x}‍‍‍^{y}	20	–	10	.667	44	–	16	.733
No. 6 NC State ‍‍‍^{y}	18	–	11	.621	38	–	23	.623
No. 4 Florida State ‍‍‍^{y}	17	–	12	.586	49	–	17	.742
Louisville ‍‍‍	16	–	14	.533	32	–	24	.571
No. 19 Wake Forest ‍‍‍^{y}	15	–	15	.500	38	–	22	.633
Notre Dame ‍‍‍	9	–	21	.300	27	–	25	.519
Boston College ‍‍‍	8	–	22	.267	22	–	31	.415
Coastal
No. 5 North Carolina ^{x}‍‍‍^{y}	22	–	8	.733	48	–	16	.750
No. 7 Virginia ‍‍‍^{y}	18	–	12	.600	46	–	17	.730
No. 24 Duke ‍‍‡‍^{y}	16	–	14	.533	40	–	20	.667
Georgia Tech ‍‍‍^{y}	15	–	15	.500	33	–	25	.569
Virginia Tech ‍‍‍	14	–	16	.467	32	–	22	.593
Miami (FL) ‍‍‍	11	–	19	.367	26	–	30	.464
Pittsburgh ‍‍‍	10	–	20	.333	26	–	28	.481
x – Division champion ‡ – Tournament champion y – Invited to the NCAA Tournament; As of June 26, 2024; Rankings from D1Baseball

The 2024 Louisville Cardinals baseball team represented the University of Louisville during the 2024 NCAA Division I baseball season. The Cardinals played their home games at Jim Patterson Stadium as a member of the Atlantic Coast Conference. They were led by head coach Dan McDonnell, in his 18th season at Louisville.

With a record of 32–24, the Cardinals missed the NCAA Tournament for the third time in four seasons and in two straight seasons for the first time under coach Dan McDonnell. Louisville was not ranked during the season.

== Previous season ==
The 2023 Louisville Cardinals baseball team finished with a 31–24 (10–20) regular season record and missed the 2023 NCAA Division I baseball tournament for the second time in three seasons.

=== 2023 MLB draft ===
The Cardinals had four players drafted in the 2023 MLB draft for its lowest total since the 2015 MLB draft.

Player	Position	Round	Overall	MLB Team
Christian Knapczyk	Shortstop	5	161	Cleveland Guardians
Tate Kuehner	Pitcher	7	212	Milwaukee Brewers
Ryan Hawks	Pitcher	8	247	Seattle Mariners
Jack Payton	Catcher	11	330	San Francisco Giants

== Personnel ==
=== Roster ===
2024 Louisville Cardinals roster
Pitchers: 11 – Ty Starke – Freshman; 15 – Colton Hartman – Freshman; 19 – TJ Schlageter – Freshman; 24 – Wyatt Danilowicz – Sophomore; 26 – Sebastian Gongora – Senior; 27 – Evan Webster – Senior; 33 – Mitchell Dean – Freshman; 34 – Jared Lessman – Junior; 40 – Jake Murphy – Freshman; 41 – Riley Phillips – Senior; 43 – Braxton Stewart – Freshman; 46 – Justin West – Sophomore; 49 – Kayden Campbell – Sophomore; 6 – Noah Bush – Junior; 7 – Kade Grundy – Junior; 10 – Carson Liggett – Junior; 17 – Kyle Crow – Freshman; 18 – Will Koger – Junior; 22 – Tucker Biven – Sophomore; 28 – Parker Detmers – Freshman; 38 – Morgan Davis – Freshman; 39 – Jake Karaba – Senior; 44 – Dan Snyder – Sophomore; 48 – Thomas Howard – Freshman; 50 – Josh Klug – Freshman; 54 – Kaleb Corbett – Senior	Catchers: 4 – Will Vierling – Sophomore; 14 – George Baker – Freshman; 25 – Matt Klein – Sophomore; 32 – Zion Rose – Freshman; 35 – Luke Napleton – Senior; 36 – Tagger Tyson – Freshman; Infielders: 0 – Alex Alicea – Freshman; 2 – Logan Beard – Senior; 5 – Gavin Kilen – Sophomore; 8 – Brandon Anderson – Junior; 9 – Dylan Hoy – Senior; 30 – Ryan McCoy – Senior	Outfielders: 13 – JT Benson – Senior; 16 – Michael Lippe – Sophomore; 20 – Korbyn Dickerson – Sophomore; 42 – Eddie King Jr. – Junior; 51 – Isaac Humphrey – Senior; 53 – Lucas Moore – Freshman; Utility: 1 – Patrick Forbes – Sophomore

=== Coaching staff ===
2024 Louisville Cardinals Coaching Staff
Name	Position	Seasons at Louisville	Alma mater
Dan McDonnell	Head coach	18	The Citadel (1992)
Roger Williams	Associate head coach/Pitching	18	East Carolina (1997)
Eric Snider	Assistant Coach/recruiting coordinator	10	Northern Iowa (1987)
Adam Vrable	Assistant Coach	10	Coastal Carolina (2007)
Brian Mundorf	Director of Operations	28	American International (1992)

== 2024 MLB draft ==
The Cardinals had only two players drafted in the 2024 MLB draft for its lowest total since the 2011 MLB draft. This was the first draft under coach Dan McDonnell that a player was not taken in the first 10 rounds.

Player	Position	Round	Overall	MLB Team
Sebastian Gongora	Pitcher	11	339	Baltimore Orioles
Kaleb Corbett	Pitcher	20	606	Tampa Bay Rays
