= 2025 Southern Conference baseball season =

- League: Southern Conference
- Sport: Baseball
- Duration: February 14, 2025 - June 23, 2025
- Games: 21 (conference)
- Teams: 8
- TV partner: ESPN+

Regular Season
- Season champions: East Tennessee State
- Season MVP: Player: Cooper Torres (ETSU); Pitcher: Brady Frederick (ETSU)

Conference Tournament
- Champions: East Tennessee State
- Runners-up: Samford
- Tournament MVP: Cooper Torres (ETSU)

Seasons
- ← 2024 2026 →

2025 Southern Conference baseball standings
	Conf.				Overall
Team	W		L	PCT	W		L	PCT
East Tennessee State ‍†‍‡‍^{y}	14	–	7	.667	41	–	17	.707
Samford ‍‍‍	13	–	8	.619	30	–	27	.526
The Citadel ‍‍‍	12	–	9	.571	31	–	26	.544
Mercer ‍‍‍	12	–	9	.571	35	–	25	.583
Western Carolina ‍‍‍	10	–	11	.476	30	–	28	.517
UNC Greensboro ‍‍‍	9	–	12	.429	21	–	33	.389
Wofford ‍‍‍	8	–	13	.381	33	–	27	.550
VMI ‍‍‍	6	–	15	.286	27	–	26	.509
† – Conference champion ‡ – Tournament champion y – Invited to the NCAA tournament As of May 31, 2025; Rankings from D1Baseball

The 2025 Southern Conference baseball season is the baseball season for the Southern Conference as part of the 2025 NCAA Division I baseball season. UNC Greensboro was predicted to win the conference in the preseason poll. The conference tournament was played from May 21 to May 25 at Fluor Field at the West End in Greenville, South Carolina.

The East Tennessee State Buccaneers won the regular season SoCon championship and obtained the #1 seed in the conference tournament. East Tennessee State also won the conference tournament, thereby receiving an automatic bid to the 2025 NCAA Division I baseball tournament.

== Regular season ==
The Southern Conference began conference play on March 21 and ended on May 17. Each team played 21 conference games, with three games against each conference opponent home or away.

In regular season play, East Tennessee State won the outright SoCon regular season title by one game. The eight SoCon baseball coaches voted Cooper Torres of East Tennessee State as 2025 SoCon Baseball Player of the Year and Brady Frederick of East Tennessee State as 2025 SoCon Baseball Pitcher of the Year. Axel Melendez of East Tennessee State was selected as 2025 SoCon Baseball Freshman of the Year, and Joe Pennucci of East Tennessee State was voted 2025 SoCon Baseball Coach of the Year. Bradley Frye of Mercer was voted as the 2025 SoCon Baseball Golden Glove recipient, which is given to the 2025 SoCon Baseball Defensive Player of the Year.

=== Conference Game Results and Standings ===
Pos	Team	Pld	CW	CL	CPCT	GB	W	L	PCT	Qualification
1	East Tennessee State (C)	53	14	7	.667	—	38	15	.717	Qualification for the third round of conference tournament
2	Samford	53	13	8	.619	1	28	25	.528	Qualification for the third round of conference tournament
3	The Citadel	54	12	9	.571	2	30	24	.556	Qualification for the second round of conference tournament
4	Mercer	56	12	9	.571	2	33	23	.589	Qualification for the second round of conference tournament
5	Western Carolina	54	10	11	.476	4	28	26	.519	Qualification for the play-in round of conference tournament
6	UNC Greensboro	53	9	12	.429	5	21	32	.396	Qualification for the play-in round of conference tournament
7	Wofford	56	8	13	.381	6	31	25	.554	Qualification for the play-in round of conference tournament
8	VMI	52	6	15	.286	8	27	25	.519	Qualification for the play-in round of conference tournament

Source: Southern Conference
(C) Regular season champion(s)

Home \ Away	CIT	ETSU	MER	SAM	UNCG	VMI	WCU	WOF
The Citadel		2–1	2–1			3–0		1–2
East Tennessee State				2–1	1–2		3–0	2–1
Mercer		1–2		2–1	3–0		2–1	
Samford	2–1				3–0		1–2	
UNC Greensboro	1–2						1–2	3–0
VMI		0–3	1–2	1–2	1–2			
Western Carolina	2–1					1–2		2–1
Wofford			2–1	0–3		2–1		

Source: Southern Conference
Legend: Blue = home team win; Red = away team win.

=== Regular Season Honors ===
Southern Conference Baseball awards for regular-season performance were unveiled on May 19, 2025. These awards included awards for player, pitcher, freshman, coach, and defensive players of the year, as well as all-conference first, second, defensive, and freshman teams.

==== Individual Honors ====
- Player of the Year: Cooper Torres (ETSU)
- Pitcher of the Year: Brady Frederick (ETSU)
- Freshman of the Year: Axel Melendez (ETSU)
- Coach of the Year: Joe Pennucci (ETSU)
- Golden Glove Recipient: Bradley Frye (MER)

==== All-Southern Conference Teams ====
Position	All SoCon First Team	All SoCon Second Team
SP	Carter Fink (ETSU)	Mason Blasche (SAM)
SP	Jace Hyde (ETSU)	Miller Riggins (SAM)
SP	Colton Cosper (MER)	Dusty Revis (WCU)
RP	Maddox Webb (CIT)	Derek McCarley (ETSU)
RP	Danny Thompson Jr. (UNCG)	Josh Leerssen (SAM)
RP	Brady Frederick (ETSU)	Carter Rasmussen (WOF)
C	Jack Spyke (WCU)	Cade Carr (SAM)
1B	Grayson Fitzwater (VMI)	Jackson Harris (SAM)
2B	Cooper Torres (ETSU)	Jeffrey Ince (SAM)
SS	Bradley Frye (MER)	Cody Miller (ETSU)
3B	Parker McDonald (SAM)	Grant Gallagher (ETSU)
OF	Jamie Palmese (ETSU)	TJ Anderson (CIT)
OF	Ty Dalley (MER)	Boston Torres (VMI)
OF	Michael Gupton (SAM)	Owen Prince (VMI)
DH	Wyatt Stanley (WCU)	Lenny Montesano (ETSU)

All SoCon Defensive Team	All SoCon Freshman Team
Phillips Daniels (CIT)	Axel Melendez (ETSU)
Garrett Dill (CIT)	Colin Ewaldsen (MER)
Travis Elliott (CIT)	JJ Parsons (UNCG)
Lane Tobin (CIT)	Parker Wright (UNCG)
Tristan Curless (ETSU)	Mason Blasche (SAM)
Cody Miller (ETSU)	Gus Gandy (SAM)
Bradley Frye (MER)	Jake Souders (SAM)
Titan Kamaka (MER)	Justin Spiegel (VMI)
Jacob Budzik (UNCG)	Trey Spees (WCU)
Jeffrey Ince (SAM)	Wyatt Stanley (WCU)
Owen Prince (VMI)	Cullen Condon (WOF)
Trent Turner (WCU)	Tanner Hardin (WOF)

== Tournament ==
2025 Southern Conference baseball tournament
- Teams: 8
- Format: Single elimination play-in, then six-team double-elimination tournament
- Finals site: Fluor Field at the West End; Greenville, SC
- Champions: East Tennessee State (1st title)
- Winning coach: Joe Pennucci (1st title)
- MVP: Cooper Torres (ETSU)
- Television: ESPN+

The 2025 Southern Conference baseball tournament was held from May 21 through May 25 at Fluor Field at the West End in Greenville, South Carolina. The winner of the conference tournament received an automatic bid to the 2025 NCAA Division I baseball tournament.

All eight SoCon baseball teams participated in the tournament and were seeded based on regular season conference record. The bottom four seeds played in a single-elimination play-in round to begin the tournament. The two play-in round winners then joined the top four seeds in a six-team double-elimination tournament, with the top two seeds receiving byes into the third round, and the third and fourth placed teams playing the play-in round winners in the second round. The Wofford Terriers were defending champions, having won the 2024 edition of the tournament.

Both play-in round winners, the Western Carolina Catamounts and Wofford, made it to the third round of the tournament, but lost their third-round games to the top two seeds, East Tennessee State Buccaneers and Samford Bulldogs, respectively, in the tournament. Western Carolina and Wofford then fell to The Citadel Bulldogs and Mercer Bears following their third-round losses.

Mercer and The Citadel both began tournament play in the second round with losses to Western Carolina and Wofford, respectively. The Bears and The Citadel then each won their first elimination game, and met each other in an elimination game afterwards. Mercer won this elimination game, but fell in their next game to Samford.

East Tennessee State and Samford received byes into the third round as the top two regular season teams. Samford won their opening matchup against The Citadel, followed by a loss to East Tennessee State in the semifinal round. Samford then won their only game in the lower bracket, resulting in another matchup with the Buccaneers in the championship match. However, East Tennessee State would prevail again, winning their first SoCon tournament title as a member of the Southern Conference, and qualified for their first NCAA tournament berth since 2013, when they were members of the Atlantic Sun Conference.

Cooper Torres of East Tennessee State received the Walt Nadzak Award (named after Walt Nadzak) for being voted as the tournament's most outstanding player.

=== Seeding ===
Pos	Team	Pld	CW	CL	CPCT	GB	W	L	PCT	Qualification
1	East Tennessee State (C, T)	53	14	7	.667	—	38	15	.717	Awarded automatic bid to NCAA tournament
2	Samford	53	13	8	.619	1	28	25	.528	Not invited to NCAA tournament
3	The Citadel	54	12	9	.571	2	30	24	.556	Not invited to NCAA tournament
4	Mercer	56	12	9	.571	2	33	23	.589	Not invited to NCAA tournament
5	Western Carolina	54	10	11	.476	4	28	26	.519	Not invited to NCAA tournament
6	UNC Greensboro	53	9	12	.429	5	21	32	.396	Not invited to NCAA tournament
7	Wofford	56	8	13	.381	6	31	25	.554	Not invited to NCAA tournament
8	VMI	52	6	15	.286	8	27	25	.519	Not invited to NCAA tournament

Source: Southern Conference
(C) Regular season champion(s); (T) Conference tournament champion

=== Bracket ===
Play-in round Wednesday, May 21
Game 1 - 3:00 p.m.
5	Western Carolina	15^{7}
8	VMI	1
Game 2 - 7:00 p.m.
6	UNC Greensboro	2
7	Wofford	4

Second round Thursday, May 22
Game 3 - 3:00 p.m.
4	Mercer	3
5	Western Carolina	10
Game 4 - 7:00 p.m.
3	The Citadel	4
7	Wofford	12
Lower third round Friday, May 23
Game 7 - 4:00 p.m.
3	The Citadel	11
5	Western Carolina	10
Game 8 - 7:30 p.m.
4	Mercer	8
7	Wofford	6

Third round Friday, May 23
Game 5 - 9:00 a.m.
1	East Tennessee State	16
5	Western Carolina	13
Game 6 - 12:30 p.m.
2	Samford	12
7	Wofford	7
Lower semifinal Saturday, May 24
Game 10 - 3:30 p.m.
3	The Citadel	2
4	Mercer	4

Semifinals; Saturday, May 24
Game 9 - 12:00 p.m.
1	East Tennessee State	14
2	Samford	8
Lower final Saturday, May 24
Game 11 - 7:00 p.m.
2	Samford	5
4	Mercer	1

Final; Sunday May, 25
Games 12/13 - 12:00 p.m.
1	East Tennessee State	7	-
2	Samford	5	-

Game times are in EDT.
Rankings denote tournament seed.
Superscripted number next to scores denote games that use extra innings or the run rule.
Source: Southern Conference

=== Schedule ===
Game	Time^{*}	Matchup^{#}	Score	Reference
Day 1 (Wednesday, May 21)
1	3:00 p.m.	No. 5 Western Carolina vs. No. 8 VMI	15−1^{7}	
2	7:00 p.m.	No. 6 UNC Greensboro vs. No. 7 Wofford	2−4	
Day 2 (Thursday, May 22)
3	3:00 p.m.	No. 5 Western Carolina vs. No. 4 Mercer	10−3	
4	7:00 p.m.	No. 7 Wofford vs. No. 3 The Citadel	12−4	
Day 3 (Friday, May 23)
5	9:00 a.m.	No. 5 Western Carolina vs. No. 1 East Tennessee State	13−16	
6	12:30 p.m.	No. 7 Wofford vs. No. 2 Samford	7−12	
7	4:00 p.m.	No. 3 The Citadel vs. No. 5 Western Carolina	11−10	
8	7:30 p.m.	No. 4 Mercer vs. No. 7 Wofford	8-6	
Day 4 (Saturday, May 24)
9	12:00 p.m.	No. 1 East Tennessee State vs. No. 2 Samford	14−8	
10	3:30 p.m.	No. 4 Mercer vs No. 3 The Citadel	4−2	
11	7:00 p.m.	No. 4 Mercer vs. No. 2 Samford	1−5	
Day 5 (Sunday, May 25)
12	12:00 p.m.	No. 1 East Tennessee State vs. No. 2 Samford	7−5	
* Game times are in EDT. # Rankings denote tournament seed. Superscripted number next to scores denote games that use extra innings or the run rule. Source: Southern Conference

=== Tournament Honors ===
The Southern Conference announced tournament honors on May 25, 2025. These awards included the Walt Nadzak Award, named after Walt Nadzak, for the tournament's most outstanding player, the Pinnacle Award for the member of the championship-winning team with the highest grade point average (GPA), as well as the 2025 All-Tournament Team.

==== Individual Awards ====
- Walt Nadzak Award (Most Outstanding Player): Cooper Torres (ETSU)
- Pinnacle Award (Highest GPA on championship-winning team): Tristan Curless (ETSU)

==== All-Tournament Team ====
Position	Player
SP	Mason Blasche (SAM)
SP	Colton Cosper (MER)
SP	Alec Bouchard (WOF)
RP	Evan Steckmesser (SAM)
RP	Terry Busse (MER)
RP	Brady Frederick (ETSU)
C	JD Yakubinis (ETSU)
1B	Jackson Harris (SAM)
2B	Travis Elliott (CIT)
SS	Cody Miller (ETSU)
3B	Aryan Patel (CIT)
OF	Brayden Corn (WCU)
OF	Axel Menendez (ETSU)
OF	Jake Souder (SAM)
DH	Cooper Torres (ETSU)

== Conference leaders ==
Hitting leaders
Stat	Player	Total
AVG	Bradley Garner (VMI)	.389
OPS	Cooper Torres (ETSU)	1.218
HR	Cooper Torres (ETSU)	23
RBI	Cooper Torres (ETSU)	72
R	Cooper Torres (ETSU)	69
H	Bradley Frye (MER)	85
SB	Owen Prince (VMI)	46

Pitching leaders
Stat	Player	Total
W	Mason Blasche (SAM)	10
L	Branton Little (WOF)	8
ERA	Brady Frederick (ETSU)	2.67
K	Davis Wright (WCU)	88
IP	Colton Cosper (MER)	88.1
SV	Terry Busse (MER); Brandon Langley (WCU)	8
WHIP	Brady Frederick (ETSU)	0.89

Updated to all games played in 2025 season. Includes regular season conference and non-conference games, as well as conference and NCAA tournament games.
Source: Southern Conference
Note: AVG, OPS, ERA, and WHIP leaders must qualify for their respective leaderboards per the SoCon Baseball 2025 Statistics webpage.

== See also ==
- 2025 in baseball
