= Louisville Cardinals baseball =

Baseball team of the University of Louisville

- 2026 Louisville Cardinals baseball team
- Founded: 1909; 117 years ago
- University: University of Louisville
- Head coach: Dan McDonnell (20th season)
- Conference: ACC
- Location: Louisville, Kentucky
- Home stadium: Jim Patterson Stadium (capacity: 4,000)
- Nickname: Cardinals
- Colors: Red and black

College World Series appearances
- 2007, 2013, 2014, 2017, 2019, 2025

NCAA regional champions
- 2007, 2009, 2013, 2014, 2015, 2016, 2017, 2019, 2022, 2025

NCAA tournament appearances
- 2002, 2007, 2008, 2009, 2010, 2012, 2013, 2014, 2015, 2016, 2017, 2018, 2019, 2022, 2025

Conference tournament champions
- Big East: 2008, 2009

Conference regular season champions
- Metro: 1983, 1984; Big East: 2009, 2010, 2012, 2013; The American: 2014; ACC: 2015, 2016, 2017, 2019

The Louisville Cardinals baseball team is the varsity intercollegiate baseball program of the University of Louisville, located in Louisville, Kentucky. The program was a member of the NCAA Division I American Athletic Conference for the 2014 season and joined the Atlantic Coast Conference in July 2014. The Cardinals have played at Jim Patterson Stadium since the venue opened during the 2005 season. Dan McDonnell has been the program's head coach since the start of the 2007 season. As of the end of the 2025 season, the program has appeared in 15 NCAA tournaments and six College World Series. In conference postseason play, it has won two Big East Conference baseball tournaments. In regular season play, it has won two Metro Conference titles, four Big East Conference titles, one American Athletic Conference title, and four Atlantic Coast Conference titles. Louisville also set the ACC record for most conference wins in a season with 25 during the 2015 season.

As of July 20, 2019, 19 former Cardinals have appeared in Major League Baseball. Seven former Cardinals have appeared in MLB games during the 2019 season: Nick Burdi, Adam Engel, Chad Green, Matt Koch, Brendan McKay, Josh Rogers, Will Smith, and Nick Solak.

== Conference affiliations ==
- Independent (1909–1912, 1920–1922, 1924–1942, 1945–1962)
- Missouri Valley Conference (1963–1975)
- Metro Conference (1976–1995)
- Conference USA (1996–2005)
- Big East Conference (2006–2013)
- American Athletic Conference (2014)
- Atlantic Coast Conference (2014–present)

== Louisville in the NCAA Tournament ==
| Year | Record | Pct | Notes |
|---|---|---|---|
| 2002 | 0–2 | .000 | Atlanta Regional |
| 2007 | 7–4 | .636 | College World Series 5th place, hosted Louisville Super Regional |
| 2008 | 0–2 | .000 | Athens Regional |
| 2009 | 3–2 | .600 | Fullerton Super Regional, hosted Louisville Regional |
| 2010 | 2–2 | .500 | Hosted Louisville Regional |
| 2012 | 2–2 | .500 | Tucson Regional |
| 2013 | 5–2 | .714 | College World Series 7th Place, hosted Louisville Regional |
| 2014 | 5–2 | .714 | College World Series 7th place, hosted Louisville Regional and Super Regional |
| 2015 | 4–2 | .667 | Hosted Louisville Regional and Super Regional |
| 2016 | 3–2 | .600 | Hosted Louisville Regional and Super Regional |
| 2017 | 6–2 | .750 | College World Series 5th place, hosted Louisville Regional and Super Regional |
| 2018 | 2–2 | .500 | Lubbock Regional |
| 2019 | 8–3 | .727 | College World Series 3rd place, hosted Louisville Regional and Super Regional |
| 2022 | 4–3 | .571 | Hosted Louisville Regional |
| 2025 | 7–3 | .833 | College World Series 3rd Place, hosted Louisville Super Regional |
| TOTALS | 58–35 | .624 | |

== Venues ==
=== Early venues ===
Early in its history, Louisville played many home games at Eclipse Park in Louisville, until the venue burned down in 1922. Other early venues included the Belknap Campus Diamond, Shawnee Park, Manual Stadium, and St. Xavier Field.

=== Parkway Field ===
Parkway Field, located on the university's campus, was the program's home sporadically from 1923 to 1960 and full-time from 1961 to 1995. The grandstand that allowed professional baseball to be played at the venue in the first half of the 20th century was torn down in 1961.

=== Derby City Field ===
For all of the 1996 and 1997 seasons and parts of the 1998 and 1999 seasons, the Cardinals played at Derby City Field.

=== Old Cardinal Stadium ===
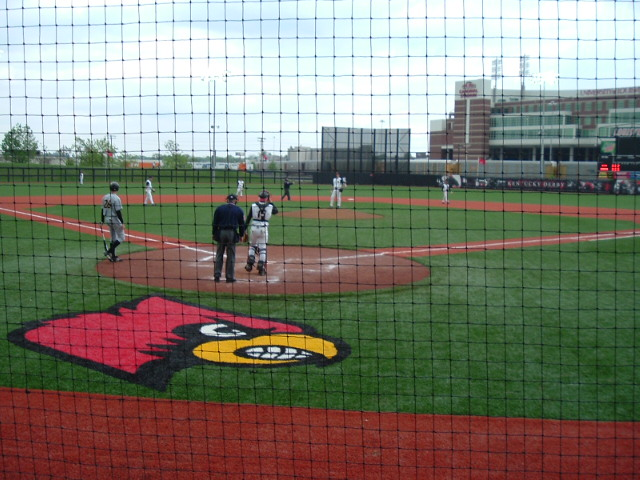
Jim Patterson Stadium in 2007.

From the start of the 1998 season through mid-April 2005, Louisville played at Old Cardinal Stadium. The Cardinals played a full schedule at Cardinal Stadium from 2000 to 2004 and portions of their schedule there in 1998, 1999, and 2005. At points in its history, the stadium was also home to the Louisville football program, minor league baseball teams, and minor league football teams.

=== Jim Patterson Stadium ===
Since partway through the 2005 season, the program has played at Jim Patterson Stadium, located on Louisville's campus. The venue has a capacity of 4,000 spectators, cost $8.5 million, and is named for businessman and former Louisville baseball player Jim Patterson. It underwent $4 million renovations prior to the 2013 season to increase its capacity and upgrade its facilities. It has hosted Eight NCAA Regionals (2009, 2010, 2013, 2014, 2015, 2016, 2017, 2019) and six Super Regionals (2007, 2014, 2015, 2016, 2017, 2019). Jim Patterson Stadium is conveniently located just behind Papa Johns Cardinal Stadium, home of the Louisville Cardinals football stadium. In effort to build JPS, Tino Martinez donated money and has his initials above the press box behind home plate. He is the brother-in-law of former head coach, Lelo Prado.

== Head coaches ==
Dan McDonnell, the program's current head coach, is Louisville's wins leader, with 605. Lelo Prado, the program's head coach from 1996 to 2006, is second, with 320. John Heldman Jr., who served as head coach for 26 seasons, is the program's longest tenured head coach.

| Tenure(s) | Coach | Seasons | W-L-T | Pct |
|---|---|---|---|---|
| 1909 | A. P. Hauss | 1 | 3–2 | .600 |
| 1910 | J. B. Helm | 1 | 3–2 | .600 |
| 1911–1912 | A. L. Bass | 2 | 8–3 (Note: Records incomplete.) | .727 |
| 1920–1922 | Tommy Kienzle | 3 | 8–6–1 | .567 |
| 1924–1925 | Fred Enke | 2 | 7–6 | .538 |
| 1926–1929 | Tom King | 4 | 30–10–1 | .750 |
| 1930–1932 | Unknown | 3 | — | — |
| 1933–1936 | C. V. Money | 4 | 18–15 | .545 |
| 1937–1942, 1945–1966 | John Heldman Jr. | 26 | 309–149–4 | .673 |
| 1967–1968 | Mario Cheppo | 2 | 11–30 | .268 |
| 1969 | Harold Adams | 1 | 9–13 | .401 |
| 1970–1973 | Dale Orem | 4 | 66–98–1 | .403 |
| 1974–1979 | Jim Zerilla | 6 | 141–148–1 | .488 |
| 1980–1981 | John Boles | 2 | 75–69 | .521 |
| 1982–1984 | Derek Mann | 3 | 78–46 | .629 |
| 1985–1990 | John Mason | 6 | 110–186–1 | .372 |
| 1991–1995 | Gene Baker | 5 | 120–179 | .401 |
| 1996–2006 | Lelo Prado | 11 | 320–301–1 | .515 |
| 2007–present | Dan McDonnell | 18 | 742–330–1 | .692 |
| Totals | 18 | 104 | 2068-1593-10 | .565 |

== Year-by-year records ==
Below is a table of the program's yearly records. Louisville's first season of varsity intercollegiate baseball was 1909. It did not sponsor a team from 1913 to 1919, in 1923 (not enough players), or from 1943 to 1944 (World War II).

| Year | Coach | Overall | Conference | Standing | Postseason |
|---|---|---|---|---|---|
| 1909 | A. P. Hauss | 3–2 | | | |
| 1910 | J. B. Helm | 3–2 | | | |
| 1911 | A. L. Bass | 8–3 | | | |
| 1912 | A. L. Bass | N/A | | | |
No program (1913–1919)
Independent (1920–1922)
| 1920 | Tommy Kienzle | N/A | | | |
| 1921 | Tommy Kienzle | 6–2 | | | |
| 1922 | Tommy Kienzle | 2–3–1 | | | |
No program (1923–1923)
Independent (1924–1942)
| 1924 | Fred Enke | 6–3 | | | |
| 1925 | Fred Enke | N/A | | | |
| 1926 | Tom King | 13–2 | | | |
| 1927 | Tom King | 8–1 | | | |
| 1928 | Tom King | 5–3 | | | |
| 1929 | Tom King | 4–4–1 | | | |
| 1930 | Unknown | N/A | | | |
| 1931 | Unknown | N/A | | | |
| 1932 | Unknown | N/A | | | |
| 1933 | C. V. Money | 7–1 | | | |
| 1934 | C. V. Money | 6–3 | | | |
| 1935 | C. V. Money | 0–7 | | | |
| 1936 | C. V. Money | 5–4 | | | |
| 1937 | John Heldman Jr. | 8–3 | | | |
| 1938 | John Heldman | 11–1–1 | | | |
| 1939 | John Heldman | 11–1 | | | |
| 1940 | John Heldman | 9–2 | | | |
| 1941 | John Heldman | 6–4 | | | |
| 1942 | John Heldman | 5–4 | | | |
No program (1943–1944)
Independent (1945–1962)
| 1945 | John Heldman | 8–2 | | | |
| 1946 | John Heldman | 5–5 | | | |
| 1947 | John Heldman | 10–7 | | | |
| 1948 | John Heldman | 12–7 | | | |
| 1949 | John Heldman | 9–7 | | | |
| 1950 | John Heldman | 9–5 | | | |
| 1951 | John Heldman | 12–4 | | | |
| 1952 | John Heldman | 10–5–1 | | | |
| 1953 | John Heldman | 8–7 | | | |
| 1954 | John Heldman | 13–6 | | | |
| 1955 | John Heldman | 15–3 | | | |
| 1956 | John Heldman | 13–10 | | | |
| 1957 | John Heldman | 15–0 | | | |
| 1958 | John Heldman | 16–4–1 | | | |
| 1959 | John Heldman | 11–11 | | | |
| 1960 | John Heldman | 12–7–1 | | | |
| 1961 | John Heldman | 15–6 | | | |
| 1962 | John Heldman | 11–7 | | | |
| Independent: | | 330–158–6 | | | |
Missouri Valley Conference (1963–1975)
| 1963 | John Heldman | 16–7 | | 2nd | MVC Tournament |
| 1964 | John Heldman | 15–8 | | 2nd | MVC Tournament |
| 1965 | John Heldman | 13–11 | 0–6 | 3rd (East) | |
| 1966 | John Heldman | 13–4 | 0–3 | 4th (East) | |
| 1967 | Mario Cheppo | 7–15 | 0–9 | 4th (East) | |
| 1968 | Mario Cheppo | 4–15 | 0–7 | 4th (East) | |
| 1969 | Harold Adams | 9–13 | 0–6 | 4th (East) | |
| 1970 | Dale Orem | 16–20–1 | 4–5 | 2nd (East) | |
| 1971 | Dale Orem | 20–22 | | 4th | MVC Tournament |
| 1972 | Dale Orem | 12–26 | | 8th | MVC Tournament |
| 1973 | Dale Orem | 18–30 | | 6th | MVC Tournament |
| 1974 | Jim Zerilla | 16–26 | | 4th | MVC Tournament |
| 1975 | Jim Zerilla | 25–28 | | 5th | MVC Tournament |
| Missouri Valley: | | 184–225–1 | 4–36 | | |
Metro Conference (1976–1995)
| 1976 | Jim Zerilla | 29–24 | 4–1 | | Metro Tournament |
| 1977 | Jim Zerilla | 26–27 | | | Metro Tournament |
| 1978 | Jim Zerilla | 27–16 | 1–1 | | Metro Tournament |
| 1979 | Jim Zerilla | 18–27–1 | 3–6 | | Metro Tournament |
| 1980 | John Boles | 38–21 | 6–3 | | Metro Tournament |
| 1981 | John Boles | 37–48 | 6–7 | | Metro Tournament |
| 1982 | Derek Mann | 22–17 | 4–3 | | Metro Tournament |
| 1983 | Derek Mann | 25–18 | 4–2 | 1st (Northern) | Metro Tournament |
| 1984 | Derek Mann | 31–11 | 6–1 | 1st (Northern) | Metro Tournament |
| 1985 | John Mason | 20–30 | 5–11 | | Metro Tournament |
| 1986 | John Mason | 18–33 | 3–13 | 7th | Metro Tournament |
| 1987 | John Mason | 12–36 | 1–14 | 7th | Metro Tournament |
| 1988 | John Mason | 18–35 | 6–11 | 7th | Metro Tournament |
| 1989 | John Mason | 27–23 | 4–10 | 6th | Metro Tournament |
| 1990 | John Mason | 15–29–1 | 4–10 | t-7th | Metro Tournament |
| 1991 | Gene Baker | 32–30 | 8–12 | 7th | Metro Tournament |
| 1992 | Gene Baker | 37–24 | 10–8 | 2nd | Metro Tournament |
| 1993 | Gene Baker | 18–41 | 3–11 | 7th | Metro Tournament |
| 1994 | Gene Baker | 16–42 | 1–17 | 7th | Metro Tournament |
| 1995 | Gene Baker | 17–42 | 5–16 | 7th | Metro Tournament |
| Metro: | | 483–574–2 | 84–157 | | |
Conference USA (1996–2005)
| 1996 | Lelo Prado | 18–36 | 6–15 | 8th | C-USA tournament (Note: In this season, all teams in Conference USA qualified for the postseason tournament.) |
| 1997 | Lelo Prado | 23–32 | 11–15 | 7th | C-USA tournament |
| 1998 | Lelo Prado | 31–24 | 14–13 | 5th | C-USA tournament |
| 1999 | Lelo Prado | 37–19 | 14–13 | 6th | C-USA tournament |
| 2000 | Lelo Prado | 17–37–1 | 10–16–1 | 8th | C-USA tournament |
| 2001 | Lelo Prado | 32–29 | 13–14 | T–5th | C-USA tournament |
| 2002 | Lelo Prado | 39–18 | 21–9 | 2nd | NCAA Regional |
| 2003 | Lelo Prado | 34–23 | 14–15 | 7th | C-USA tournament |
| 2004 | Lelo Prado | 26–30 | 13–17 | 8th | C-USA tournament |
| 2005 | Lelo Prado | 32–24 | 15–14 | T–6th | C-USA tournament |
| Conference USA: | | 289–272–1 | 131–141–1 | | |
Big East Conference (2006–2013)
| 2006 | Lelo Prado | 31–29 | 17–10 | 3rd | Big East tournament |
| 2007 | Dan McDonnell | 47–24 | 19–8 | 3rd | College World Series |
| 2008 | Dan McDonnell | 41–21 | 16–11 | 4th | NCAA Regional |
| 2009 | Dan McDonnell | 47–18 | 19–7 | 1st | NCAA Super Regional |
| 2010 | Dan McDonnell | 50–14 | 21–6 | 1st | NCAA Regional |
| 2011 | Dan McDonnell | 32–29 | 14–13 | T–4th | Big East tournament |
| 2012 | Dan McDonnell | 41–22 | 18–9 | T–1st | NCAA Regional |
| 2013 | Dan McDonnell | 51–14 | 20–4 | 1st | College World Series |
| Big East: | | 340–171 | 144–68 | | |
American Athletic Conference (2014)
| 2014 | Dan McDonnell | 50–17 | 19–5 | 1st | College World Series |
| American Athletic Conference: | | 50–17 | 19–5 | | |
Atlantic Coast Conference (2015–present)
| 2015 | Dan McDonnell | 47–18 | 25–5 | 1st | NCAA Super Regional |
| 2016 | Dan McDonnell | 50–14 | 22–8 | 1st | NCAA Super Regional |
| 2017 | Dan McDonnell | 53–12 | 23–6 | 1st | College World Series |
| 2018 | Dan McDonnell | 45–19 | 18–12 | 3rd (Atlantic) | NCAA Regional |
| 2019 | Dan McDonnell | 51–18 | 21–9 | 1st | College World Series |
| 2020 | Dan McDonnell | 13–4 | 2–1 | | Season cut short by the COVID-19 pandemic. |
| 2021 | Dan McDonnell | 28–22 | 16–16 | 4th (Atlantic) | |
| 2022 | Dan McDonnell | 42–21–1 | 18–11–1 | 1st (Atlantic) | NCAA Super Regional |
| 2023 | Dan McDonnell | 31–24 | 10–20 | 6th (Atlantic) | |
| 2024 | Dan McDonnell | 32–24 | 16–14 | 4th (Atlantic) | |
| 2025 | Dan McDonnell | 40–22 | 15–15 | 10th (Atlantic) | College World Series |
| Atlantic Coast Conference: | | 432–198–1 .685 | 186–117–1 .613 | | |
| Total: | | 2113-1624-11 .565 | | | |
National champion Postseason invitational champion Conference regular season champion Conference regular season and conference tournament champion Division regular season champion Division regular season and conference tournament champion Conference tournament champion

== Rivalries ==
=== Kentucky ===
The Cardinals rivalry with the Kentucky Wildcats is a multi sport rivalry with the baseball series known as the Battle of the Bluegrass. The two teams first met in 1925 and have met annually in a two-game, home and home series since 1970. Kentucky leads the series 66–50–1. As of June 2025, Louisville has won 14 of the last 18 meetings.

=== Vanderbilt ===
The Louisville rivalry with the Vanderbilt Commodores is a baseball rivalry known as the Battle of the Barrel. The two teams first met in 1971 and have met annually since 2008 to play in a midweek game for a traveling oak barrel trophy. The rivalry has been amplified by the success of the two programs during the 21st century, the close proximity of the two universities, and the regular postseason encounters. Vanderbilt leads the series 30–14, but the trophy series is tied 7–7.

=== Cincinnati ===
The Cardinals rivalry with the Cincinnati Bearcats is a multi sport rivalry between two former conference foes. The two teams first met in 1924 and have met annually in a single midweek game series since Louisville joined the ACC in 2015. Louisville leads the series 104–84. As of June 2025, Louisville has won 14 of the last 18 meetings.

== Notable former players ==
The following is a list of notable former Cardinals and the seasons in which they played for the program.

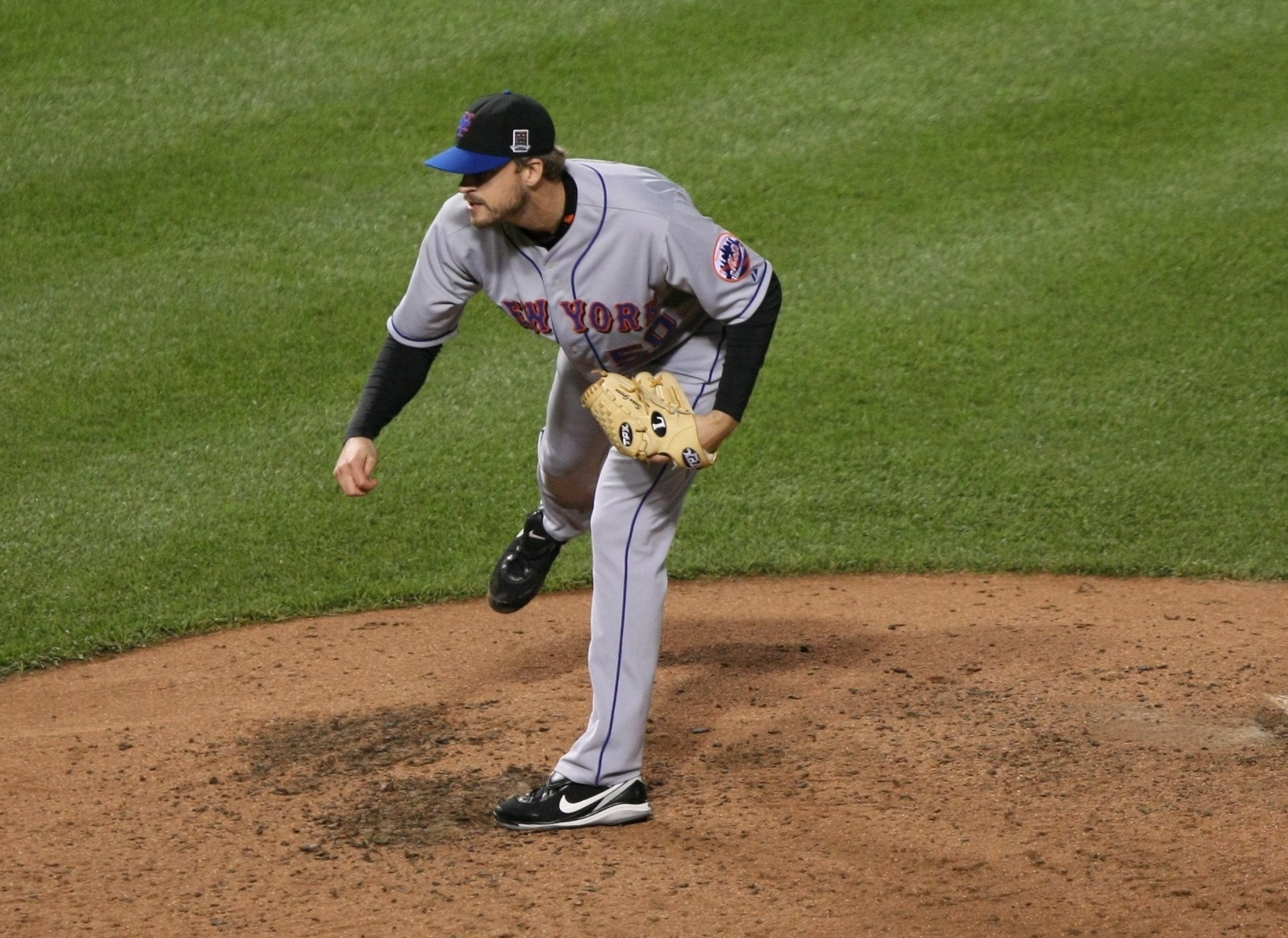
Sean Green while pitching for the MLB's New York Mets.

- Nick Burdi (2012–2014)
- Chris Cates (2004–2007)
- Chris Dominguez (2006–2009)
- Adam Duvall (2008–2010)
- Cody Ege (2011–2013)
- Adam Engel (2011–2013)
- Chad Green (2011–2013)
- Sean Green (1998–2000)
- Zach Jackson (2002–2003)
- Dean Kiekhefer (2008–2009)
- Matt Koch (2010–2012)
- Fred Koster (1926–1928)
- Trystan Magnuson (2004–2007)
- Justin Marks (2007–2009)
- Kyle McGrath (2013–2014)
- Brendan McKay (2015–2017)
- Dale Orem (1957–1960)
- Josh Rogers (2014–2015)
- B. J. Rosenberg (2004–2008)
- Will Smith (2014–2016)
- Nick Solak (2014–2016)
- Tony Zych (2009–2011)
- Dalton Rushing (2020–2022)

== See also ==
- List of NCAA Division I baseball programs
- Louisville Cardinals
