= Missouri Southern Lions =

- University: Missouri Southern State University
- NCAA: Division II
- Conference: The MIAA
- Athletic director: Rob Mallory
- Location: Joplin, Missouri
- Varsity teams: 12
- Football stadium: Fred G. Hughes Stadium
- Basketball arena: Leggett & Platt Athletic Center
- Baseball stadium: Warren Turner Field
- Nickname: Lions
- Colors: Green and gold
- Mascot: Roary the Lion
- Fight song: Southern Fight Song
- Website: mssulions.com
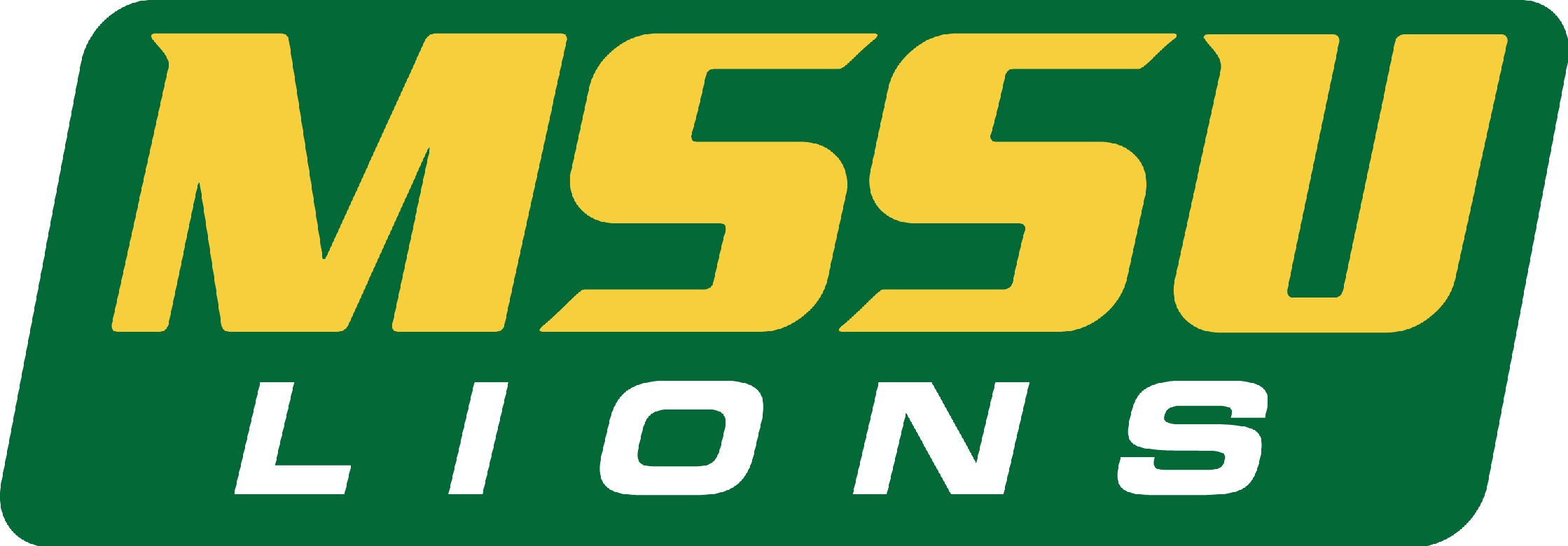

The Missouri Southern Lions are composed of 12 teams representing Missouri Southern State University in intercollegiate athletics. The Lions compete in the NCAA Division II and are members of the Mid-America Intercollegiate Athletics Association.

== Sports sponsored ==
Men's sports	Women's sports
Baseball	Basketball
Basketball	Cross country
Cross country	Soccer
Football	Softball
Golf	Track and field^{†}
Track and field^{†}	Volleyball
† – Track and field includes both indoor and outdoor

=== Baseball ===
MIAA logo in Missouri Southern's colors

Missouri Southern has had 14 Major League Baseball draft selections since the draft began in 1965. Additionally, Logan VanWey, who signed with the Houston Astros as an undrafted free agent in 2022, made his major league debut with the Astros in 2025.

Year	Player	Round	Team
1981	Randy Braun	12	Astros
1984	Michael Gildehaus	20	Padres
1990	Daniel Rogers	8	Tigers
1991	Timothy Casper	55	Giants
1991	Ken Grundt	53	Giants
1991	Timothy Luther	12	Giants
1992	David Fisher	29	Phillies
1995	Scott Wright	41	Reds
1995	Bryce Darnell	40	Cardinals
1996	Bryce Darnell	58	Diamondbacks
2005	Jeffrey Taylor	24	Nationals
2009	Justin Beal	28	Phillies
2010	Joseph Lincoln	34	Dodgers
2014	Logan Moon	6	Royals
2017	Max Hogan	32	Orioles

== National championships ==
=== Team ===
Sport	Association	Division	Year	Opponent/Runner-up	Score/Points
Softball (1)	NCAA	Division II	1992	Cal State Hayward	1–0

== Mascot ==
As of 2012 the Mascot's official name has become Roary the Lion. He made his debut at the October 6, 2012, Homecoming game against the South Dakota Mines. He is a staple at all home sporting events, as well as throughout the community of Joplin.

== Facilities ==
- Warren Turner Field (opened in 2015) is named after long-time MSSU baseball coach Warren Turner. The year 2015 marked the first time the MSSU Baseball Program played on campus in more than 40 years. The first game played on the field was February 14, 2015, against Upper Iowa University. A formal dedication of the field occurred on April 18, 2015.
- Fred G. Hughes Stadium (opened in 1975) is named after former Joplin Globe publisher and Missouri Southern board of regents member (1965–1981) Fred G. Hughes (1913–1994). Due to a large financial donation by the Robert W. Plaster Foundation, the stadium is expected to be renamed in his honor in the near future, though the plaza at the entrance to the stadium may be named after Hughes. The stadium's artificial turf was replaced in 2003.
- Leggett & Platt Athletic Center (opened in 1999) is named for Leggett & Platt, a major manufacturing firm located in Carthage, Missouri. Leggett & Platt was a major donor for the construction of this facility. The facility seats more than 3,200 for basketball and other indoor sports. It also includes an indoor track and field facility.
- Robert Ellis Young Gymnasium (opened in 1968) is named after Robert Ellis Young (1919–1995). Young had represented the area in the Missouri House of Representatives. The 1,700-seat gymnasium was home to the university's basketball teams from 1968 until 1999, when they moved to the Leggett & Platt Athletic Center. The school's volleyball team currently uses the facility. The university's swimming pool is also located in this building.

== Fight song ==
Southern Fight Song is the official fight song for Missouri Southern State University. The MSSU Fight Song lyrics were selected during a contest conducted in late 2012 and early 2013. Until the winner was announced at the Lions vs. Central Oklahoma Bronchos basketball game Thursday, February 21, 2013 in Leggett & Platt Athletic Center, only the musical score existed.

== Athletics tragedies ==
- On September 27, 2005 head football coach John Ware experienced a severe heart attack while working in his campus office. Coaching staff administered CPR at the scene but Ware was pronounced dead on arrival at a Joplin hospital a short time later. Ware was in his second year as the Lions' head coach.
- In the early morning on Friday, December 2, 2011, two Missouri Southern football players were killed in an automobile accident that injured two other students. Michael McCrimmons and Diondre Johnson, both 19-year-old freshmen from Springfield, Missouri died in the crash; the vehicle ran off the road on Interstate 44 about two miles east of Sarcoxie, Missouri. A vigil was being planned for the students, according to President Bruce W. Speck.
- On the night of November 1, 2013, Missouri Southern football offensive line coach Derek Moore was shot outside a Joplin theater and later died at an area hospital. Moore was in his first year on the Missouri Southern coaching staff after spending the previous three seasons at Western Illinois University. Due to the shooting death school officials cancelled Homecoming activities.
