= Dan McDonnell =

American college baseball coach

Current position
- Title: Head coach
- Team: Louisville
- Conference: ACC
- Record: 814–380–1
- Annual salary: $1.05 million

Playing career
- 1989–1992: The Citadel
- Position: Second baseman

Coaching career (HC unless noted)
- 1993–2000: The Citadel (assistant)
- 2001–2006: Ole Miss (assistant)
- 2007–present: Louisville

Head coaching record
- Overall: 814–380–1
- Tournaments: 30–22

Accomplishments and honors

Championships
- 4× Big East regular season (2009, 2010, 2012, 2013); 2x Big East tournament (2008, 2009); American regular season (2014); 4x ACC regular season (2015–2017, 2019); 5× ACC Atlantic Division (2015–2017, 2019, 2022); 6x College World Series (2007, 2013, 2014, 2017, 2019, 2025)

Awards
- 3x ACC Coach of the Year (2015–2017)

Dan McDonnell is an American college baseball coach who has been the head coach of the Louisville Cardinals since the start of the 2007 season. As of the end of the 2025 season, Louisville has a 793-359-1 (.689 winning percentage) record in 19 seasons record under McDonnell and has appeared in six College World Series (2007, 2013, 2014, 2017, 2019, 2025), 10 super regionals, and 14 NCAA tournaments. Under McDonnell, the Cardinals have won two Big East tournaments and four Big East regular season titles. McDonnell was one game away in 2015 from leading his Louisville Cardinals to three straight College World Series appearances.

McDonnell has coached with pitching coach Roger Williams all 20 years together at Louisville as they enter the 2026 season. Combined, they have had over 100 players drafted in 19 years as of 2025. They have had 10 first-round picks to include the overall number 1 selection Henry Davis in 2021 and their most recent 1st rounder (29th) Patrick Forbes in 2025.

McDonnell grew up in Rye Brook, New York, and attended Port Chester High School. McDonnell played college baseball at The Citadel from 1989 to 1992. He appeared in the 1990 College World Series with the Bulldogs. Following his playing career, McDonnell was an assistant coach at The Citadel from 1993 to 2000. He was an assistant at Ole Miss from 2001 to 2006.

== Head coaching record ==
Record table
Season	Team	Overall	Conference	Standing	Postseason
Louisville Cardinals (Big East Conference) (2007–2013)
2007	Louisville	47–24	19–8	3rd	College World Series
2008	Louisville	41–21	16–11	4th	NCAA Regional
2009	Louisville	47–18	19–7	1st	NCAA Super Regional
2010	Louisville	50–14	21–6	1st	NCAA Regional
2011	Louisville	32–29	14–13	T–4th	
2012	Louisville	41–22	18–9	T–1st	NCAA Regional
2013	Louisville	51–14	20–4	1st	College World Series
Louisville:			127–58 (.686)		
Louisville Cardinals (American Athletic Conference) (2014)
2014	Louisville	50–17	19–5	1st	College World Series
Louisville:			19–5 (.792)		
Louisville Cardinals (Atlantic Coast Conference) (2015–present)
2015	Louisville	47–18	25–5	1st (Atlantic)	NCAA Super Regional
2016	Louisville	50–14	22–8	1st (Atlantic)	NCAA Super Regional
2017	Louisville	52–10	23–6	1st (Atlantic)	College World Series
2018	Louisville	45–19	18–12	3rd (Atlantic)	NCAA Regional
2019	Louisville	43–15	21–9	1st (Atlantic)	College World Series
2020	Louisville	13–4	2–1	(Atlantic)	Season canceled due to COVID-19
2021	Louisville	28–22	16–16	4th (Atlantic)	
2022	Louisville	42–21–1	18–11–1	1st (Atlantic)	NCAA Super Regional
2023	Louisville	31–24	10–20	6th (Atlantic)	
2024	Louisville	32–24	16–14	4th (Atlantic)	ACC Tournament
2025	Louisville	42–24	15–15	10th	College World Series
2026	Louisville	30–27	13–17	T–10th	ACC Tournament
Louisville:		814–380–1 (.682)	200–134–1 (.599)		
Total:		814–380–1 (.682)			
National champion Postseason invitational champion Conference regular season champion Conference regular season and conference tournament champion Division regular season champion Division regular season and conference tournament champion Conference tournament champion

== See also ==
- List of current NCAA Division I baseball coaches
