= 2025 Arkansas Razorbacks baseball team =

American college baseball team

2025 Arkansas Razorbacks baseball
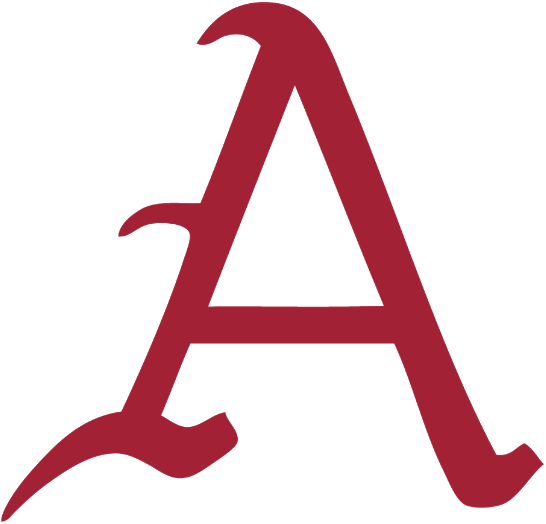

Fayetteville Regional champions Fayetteville Super Regional champions

College World Series, 3rd
- Conference: Southeastern Conference

Ranking
- Coaches: No. 5
- D1Baseball.com: No. 3
- Record: 50–15 (20–10 SEC)
- Head coach: Dave Van Horn (23rd season)
- Assistant coaches: Matt Hobbs; Nate Thompson Bobby Wernes
- Home stadium: Baum–Walker Stadium

2025 Southeastern Conference baseball standings
	Conf.				Overall
Team	W		L	PCT	W		L	PCT
No. 17 Texas ‍†‍‍^{y}	22	–	8	.733	44	–	14	.759
No. 3 Arkansas ‍‍‍^{y}	20	–	10	.667	50	–	15	.769
No. 1 LSU ‍‍‍^{y}	19	–	11	.633	53	–	15	.779
No. 18 Vanderbilt ‍‍‡‍^{y}	19	–	11	.633	43	–	18	.705
No. 19 Georgia ‍‍‍^{y}	18	–	12	.600	43	–	17	.717
No. 11 Auburn ‍‍‍^{y}	17	–	13	.567	41	–	20	.672
No. 21 Ole Miss ‍‍‍^{y}	16	–	14	.533	43	–	21	.672
No. 12 Tennessee ‍‍‍^{y}	16	–	14	.533	46	–	19	.708
Alabama ‍‍‍^{y}	16	–	14	.533	41	–	18	.695
Florida ‍‍‍^{y}	15	–	15	.500	39	–	22	.639
Mississippi State ‍‍‍^{y}	15	–	15	.500	36	–	23	.610
Oklahoma ‍‍‍^{y}	14	–	16	.467	38	–	22	.633
Kentucky ‍‍‍^{y}	13	–	17	.433	31	–	26	.544
Texas A&M ‍‍‍	11	–	19	.367	30	–	26	.536
South Carolina ‍‍‍	6	–	24	.200	28	–	29	.491
Missouri ‍‍‍	3	–	27	.100	16	–	39	.291
† – Conference champion ‡ – Tournament champion y – Invited to the NCAA Tournament; As of June 22, 2025; Rankings from D1Baseball

The 2025 Arkansas Razorbacks baseball team represents the University of Arkansas in the 2025 NCAA Division I baseball season. The Razorbacks play their home games at Baum–Walker Stadium in Fayetteville, Arkansas. Dave Van Horn is in his 23rd season as head coach of the Razorbacks.

On May 19, shortstop Wehiwa Aloy was named the SEC Player of the Year. Aloy, along with pitcher Zach Root, outfielder Charles Davalan, and DH Kuhio Aloy were named to the 1st Team All-SEC squad, while infielder Cam Kozeal was placed on the 2nd Team. On June 11, Wehiwa Aloy was named 1st team All-American by Perfect Game, while Zach Root and Charles Davalan were placed on the 2nd team. On June 21, Wehiwa Aloy became the third Razorback to win the Golden Spikes Award, which is given to the best player in the nation.

Arkansas earned the overall No. 3 national seed in the NCAA Baseball Tournament and hosted a Regional. On June 1, Arkansas defeated Creighton to win the Fayetteville Regional championship and earned the right to host a Super Regional. Catcher Ryder Helfrick was named the Fayetteville Regional MVP. On June 7 and 8, Arkansas defeated Tennessee twice to win the Fayetteville Super Regional championship and earned a spot in the 2025 College World Series (CWS) in Omaha, Nebraska. Helfrick also earned MVP honors of the Fayetteville Super Regional.

On June 14 at the CWS, Arkansas lost their first game to LSU, 4–1, sending the Razorbacks to the losers bracket. On June 16, Arkansas junior pitcher Gage Wood threw the third no-hitter in College World Series history, and the first since 1960, beating Murray State 3–0. Wood went 9 complete innings with a CWS-record 19 strikeouts, allowed 0 hits, 0 runs, 0 walks, and the only Murray State player allowed on base was due to a hit batter in the 8th inning. On June 17, Arkansas defeated UCLA 7–3 to advance to the CWS semi-finals versus LSU. Arkansas lost to LSU 6–5 on June 18, ending their season.

== Previous season ==
Arkansas won the SEC Western Division, but failed to get out of a home regional for the second straight year, losing to Southeast Missouri State to end its season.

== Roster ==
2025 Arkansas Razorbacks baseball team
Players
Coaches

#	Pos.	Name	B/T	Height	Weight	Year	Previous school	Home town
1	C	Rocco Peppi	R/R	5 ft 10 in (1.78 m)	195 lb (88 kg)	RS Sr	Marina HS / California State University, Long Beach / California State University, Fresno	Huntington Beach, California
3	INF	Nolan Souza	L/R	6 ft 3 in (1.91 m)	215 lb (98 kg)	So	Punahou School	Honolulu, Hawaii
4	OF	Justin Thomas Jr.	R/R	5 ft 11 in (1.8 m)	195 lb (88 kg)	Jr	Benedictine Military School / University of Georgia / Florida SouthWestern State College	Savannah, Georgia
5	OF	Kendall Diggs	L/R	6 ft 0 in (1.83 m)	210 lb (95 kg)	Sr	Saint Thomas Aquinas HS	Olathe, Kansas
6	INF	Gabe Fraser	L/R	6 ft 2 in (1.88 m)	190 lb (86 kg)	Fr	Orange Lutheran HS	Huntington Beach, California
8	INF	Cam Kozeal	L/R	5 ft 10 in (1.78 m)	200 lb (91 kg)	So	Millard South HS / Vanderbilt University	Omaha, Nebraska
9	INF	Wehiwa Aloy	R/R	6 ft 2 in (1.88 m)	200 lb (91 kg)	Jr	Henry Perrine Baldwin HS / California State University, Sacramento	Wailuku, Hawaii
10	INF	Brent Iredale	R/R	6 ft 3 in (1.91 m)	200 lb (91 kg)	Jr	Hills Sports HS / New Mexico Junior College	Sydney, NSW, Australia
12	C	Elliott Peterson	R/R	6 ft 0 in (1.83 m)	190 lb (86 kg)	Jr	Creighton Preparatory School / Southeast Community College	Omaha, Nebraska
13	RHP	Steele Eaves	R/R	6 ft 0 in (1.83 m)	210 lb (95 kg)	Fr	Lonoke HS	Lonoke, Arkansas
14	RHP	Gage Wood	R/R	6 ft 0 in (1.83 m)	205 lb (93 kg)	Jr	Batesville HS	Batesville, Arkansas
16	RHP	Aiden Jimenez	R/R	6 ft 3 in (1.91 m)	215 lb (98 kg)	RS So	Elk Grove HS / Oregon State University	Elk Grove, California
17	C	Zane Becker	R/R	5 ft 11 in (1.8 m)	200 lb (91 kg)	Fr	Flower Mound HS	Flower Mound, Texas
18	INF	Reese Robinett	L/R	6 ft 3 in (1.91 m)	220 lb (100 kg)	RS So	Kennett HS	Kennett, Missouri
19	C	Carson Willis	R/R	5 ft 11 in (1.8 m)	195 lb (88 kg)	Fr	P27 Baseball Academy	Rogers, Arkansas
20	RHP	Gabe Gaeckle	R/R	6 ft 0 in (1.83 m)	190 lb (86 kg)	So	Aptos HS	Aptos, California
21	OF	Brenton Clark	L/R	5 ft 11 in (1.8 m)	190 lb (86 kg)	Fr	Pleasant Grove HS	Texarkana, Texas
22	OF	Logan Maxwell	L/L	5 ft 10 in (1.78 m)	195 lb (88 kg)	Sr	Shawnee HS / Texas Christian University	Lima, Ohio
24	OF	Charles Davalan	L/R	5 ft 9 in (1.75 m)	190 lb (86 kg)	So	TNXL Academy / Florida Gulf Coast University	Montreal, QC, Canada
25	INF	Kuhio Aloy	R/R	6 ft 1 in (1.85 m)	205 lb (93 kg)	So	Henry Perrine Baldwin HS / Brigham Young University	Wailuku, Hawaii
26	RHP	Tate McGuire	R/R	6 ft 3 in (1.91 m)	215 lb (98 kg)	So	Liberty North HS	Liberty, Missouri
27	C	Ryder Helfrick	R/R	6 ft 1 in (1.85 m)	205 lb (93 kg)	So	Clayton Valley Charter HS	Discovery Bay, California
28	OF	Carson Boles	R/R	5 ft 11 in (1.8 m)	190 lb (86 kg)	Sr	Lebanon HS / Lincoln Memorial University	Lebanon, Tennessee
29	LHP	Cole Gibler	L/L	6 ft 2 in (1.88 m)	205 lb (93 kg)	Fr	Blue Springs HS	Blue Springs, Missouri
31	RHP	Dylan Carter	R/R	6 ft 2 in (1.88 m)	220 lb (100 kg)	RS Sr	Bentonville West HS / Crowder College	Bentonville, Arkansas
32	LHP	Hunter Dietz	R/L	6 ft 6 in (1.98 m)	235 lb (107 kg)	RS Fr	Calvary Christian HS	Trinity, Florida
33	LHP	Zach Root	L/L	6 ft 2 in (1.88 m)	210 lb (95 kg)	Jr	Fort Myers Senior HS / East Carolina University	Fort Myers, Florida
35	LHP	Landon Beidelschies	L/L	6 ft 3 in (1.91 m)	230 lb (104 kg)	Jr	Canfield HS / Ohio State University	Canfield, Ohio
36	LHP	Parker Coil	R/L	6 ft 3 in (1.91 m)	185 lb (84 kg)	Jr	Edmond Memorial HS	Edmond, Oklahoma
37	LHP	Luke Williams	L/L	5 ft 11 in (1.8 m)	185 lb (84 kg)	Fr	Owasso HS	Owasso, Oklahoma
38	LHP	Colin Fisher	L/L	6 ft 3 in (1.91 m)	225 lb (102 kg)	So	Noble HS	Noble, Oklahoma
40	RHP	Ben Bybee	R/R	6 ft 6 in (1.98 m)	230 lb (104 kg)	Jr	Blue Valley Southwest HS	Overland Park, Kansas
41	RHP	Will McEntire	L/R	6 ft 4 in (1.93 m)	235 lb (107 kg)	RS Sr	Bryant HS	Bryant, Arkansas
42	INF	Michael Anderson	R/R	6 ft 3 in (1.91 m)	230 lb (104 kg)	Jr	Bonner & Prendergast Catholic HS / University of Rhode Island	Havertown, Pennsylvania
44	RHP	Carson Wiggins	R/R	6 ft 5 in (1.96 m)	215 lb (98 kg)	Fr	Roland HS	Roland, Oklahoma
45	RHP	Lance Davis	R/R	6 ft 4 in (1.93 m)	200 lb (91 kg)	Fr	Valley View HS	Jonesboro, Arkansas
46	RHP	Christian Foutch	R/R	6 ft 3 in (1.91 m)	240 lb (109 kg)	Jr	Chatfield HS	Littleton, Colorado
48	RHP	Cooper Dossett	R/R	6 ft 0 in (1.83 m)	200 lb (91 kg)	Jr	Har-Ber HS	Springdale, Arkansas
49	LHP	Jackson Farrell	L/L	6 ft 1 in (1.85 m)	215 lb (98 kg)	Fr	Owasso HS	Jenks, Oklahoma
50	RHP	Tag Andrews	R/R	6 ft 0 in (1.83 m)	190 lb (86 kg)	Fr	Maumelle HS	Maumelle, Arkansas
52	C	Tyler Holland	R/R	6 ft 1 in (1.85 m)	190 lb (86 kg)	Fr	Mission Viejo HS	Mission Viejo, California
57	RHP	Ross Felder	R/R	6 ft 2 in (1.88 m)	185 lb (84 kg)	Fr	Har-Ber HS	Springdale, Arkansas

Head coach

Dave Van Horn (Arkansas, 1988)

Assistant coach(es)

Bobby Wernes (Arkansas, 2018)
Hudson Polk (Arkansas, 2024)

Hitting coach(es)

Nate Thompson (Dallas Baptist, 2006)

Pitching coach(es)

Matt Hobbs (Missouri, 2002)

Legend

- (C) Team captain
- (S) Suspended
- (I) Ineligible
- Injured
- Current redshirt

Roster
Last update: March 9, 2025

== Schedule and results ==
2025 Arkansas Razorbacks baseball game log (50–15)
Regular season (43–12)

February (8–1)
Date	Opponent	Rank	Site/stadium	Score	Win	Loss	Save	TV	Attendance	Overall record	SEC record
February 14 (DH-1)^	Washington State	No. 5	Baum–Walker Stadium; Fayetteville, Arkansas	**W** 3–2 (10)	**Foutch** (1–0)	Stowe (0–1)		SECN+	9,112	1–0	—
February 14 (DH-2)^	Washington State	No. 5	Baum–Walker Stadium	**W** 14–2 (7)	**Root** (1–0)	Lewis (0–1)		SECN+	9,112	2–0	—
February 15	Washington State	No. 5	Baum–Walker Stadium	**W** 5–2	**Carter** (1–0)	Tedesco (0–1)	**Wiggins** (1)	SECN+	9,418	3–0	—
February 17	Washington State	No. 5	Baum–Walker Stadium	**W** 12–2 (7)	**Beidelschies** (1–0)	Chambers (0–1)		SECN+	8,780	4–0	—
College Baseball Series
February 21	vs. Kansas State	No. 5	Globe Life Field; Arlington, Texas	**L** 2–3	Dean (1–0)	**McGuire** (0–1)		FloBaseball	13,886	4–1	—
February 22	vs. No. 22 TCU	No. 5	Globe Life Field	**W** 2–1	**Beidelschies** (2–0)	LaPour (1–1)	**Foutch** (1)	FloBaseball	17,994	5–1	—
February 23	vs. Michigan	No. 5	Globe Life Field	**W** 8–6	**Carter** (2–0)	DeVooght (2–1)	**McGuire** (1)	FloBaseball	12,862	6–1	—
February 25	Grambling State	No. 4	Baum–Walker Stadium	**W** 14–3 (7)	**Bybee** (1–0)	Robinson (0–1)		SECN+	9,073	7–1	—
February 28	Charlotte	No. 4	Baum–Walker Stadium	**W** 11–10	**Carter** (3–0)	Sarver (0–1)	**Foutch** (2)	SECN+	9,563	8–1	—
^Rescheduled as a doubleheader of nine-inning games due to inclement weather forecasted for Sunday, February 16

March (18–2)
Date	Opponent	Rank	Site/stadium	Score	Win	Loss	Save	TV	Attendance	Overall record	SEC record
March 1	Charlotte	No. 4	Baum–Walker Stadium	**W** 8–5	**Jimenez** (1–0)	Taylor (0–1)	**Wiggins** (2)	SECN+	10,938	9–1	—
March 2	Charlotte	No. 4	Baum–Walker Stadium	**W** 4–3	**McEntire** (1–0)	Stanton (0–1)		SECN+	9,199	10–1	—
March 4	Louisiana–Monroe	No. 3	Baum–Walker Stadium	**W** 14–1 (7)	**Fisher** (1–0)	Eager (1–1)		SECN+	8,768	11–1	—
March 5	Louisiana–Monroe	No. 3	Baum–Walker Stadium	**W** 15–3 (7)	**Bybee** (2–0)	Cirelli (0–3)		SECN+	8,624	12–1	—
March 7	Portland	No. 3	Baum–Walker Stadium	**W** 20–3 (7)	**Gaeckle** (1–0)	Gaston (0–4)		SECN+	9,982	13–1	—
March 8	Portland	No. 3	Baum–Walker Stadium	**W** 10–0 (7)	**Root** (2–0)	Segel (1–2)		SECN+	10,536	14–1	—
March 9	Portland	No. 3	Baum–Walker Stadium	**W** 5–3	**Beidelschies** (3–0)	Rembisz (2–1)	**Wiggins** (3)	SECN+	9,416	15–1	—
March 11	Central Arkansas	No. 3	Baum–Walker Stadium	**W** 9–2	**Fisher** (2–0)	Titlow (0–1)		SECN+	10,742	16–1	—
March 14	at No. 13 Ole Miss	No. 3	Swayze Field; Oxford, Mississippi	**L** 6–10	Elliott (4–0)	**Root** (2–1)		SECN+	9,090	16–2	0–1
March 15	at No. 13 Ole Miss	No. 3	Swayze Field	**W** 12–3	**Coil** (1–0)	Maddox (3–2)	**Jimenez** (1)	SECN+	9,304	17–2	1–1
March 16	at No. 13 Ole Miss	No. 3	Swayze Field	**W** 12–9	**Wiggins** (1–0)	Spencer (0–1)		SECN+	9,164	18–2	2–1
March 18	Oral Roberts	No. 3	Baum–Walker Stadium	**W** 4–1	**Gibler** (1–0)	Johnson (0–1)	**Foutch** (3)	SECN+	9,922	19–2	—
March 19	Oral Roberts	No. 3	Baum–Walker Stadium	**W** 16–0 (7)	**Fisher** (3–0)	Puffinbarger (0–1)		SECN+	9,121	20–2	—
March 21	South Carolina	No. 3	Baum–Walker Stadium	**W** 12–2 (7)	**Root** (3–1)	Stone (1–2)		SECN+	10,023	21–2	3–1
March 22	South Carolina	No. 3	Baum–Walker Stadium	**W** 12–3	**Jimenez** (2–0)	McCoy (2–2)	**McEntire** (1)	SECN+	9,759	22–2	4–1
March 23	South Carolina	No. 3	Baum–Walker Stadium	**W** 11–4	**Coil** (2–0)	Sweeney (0–2)		SECN+	9,367	23–2	5–1
March 25	Missouri State	No. 2	Baum–Walker Stadium	**L** 13–14 (10)	Holmes (3–3)	**McGuire** (0–2)	Knight (1)	SECN+	10,035	23–3	—
March 28	at No. 14 Vanderbilt	No. 2	Hawkins Field; Nashville, Tennessee	**W** 9–0	**Root** (4–1)	Thompson (2–2)		SEC Network	3,802	24–3	6–1
March 29	at No. 14 Vanderbilt	No. 2	Hawkins Field	**W** 6–4 (10)	**Jimenez** (3–0)	Green (0–2)		SECN+	3,802	25–3	7–1
March 30	at No. 14 Vanderbilt	No. 2	Hawkins Field	**W** 7–3	**Bybee** (3–0)	Kranzler (3–1)		SECN+	3,802	26–3	8–1

April (11–6)
Date	Opponent	Rank	Site/stadium	Score	Win	Loss	Save	TV	Attendance	Overall record	SEC record
April 1	vs. Grambling State	No. 2	Dickey–Stephens Park; North Little Rock, Arkansas	**W** 7–4	**McGuire** (1–2)	Robinson (0–4)	**Gibler** (1)	SECN+	9,312	27–3	—
April 5	Missouri	No. 2	Baum–Walker Stadium	**W** 21–3 (7)	**Root** (5–1)	Jacobi (2–4)		SECN+	9,927	28–3	9–1
April 6 (DH-1)^{†}	Missouri	No. 2	Baum–Walker Stadium	**W** 14–4 (7)	**Gaeckle** (2–0)	Lucas (1–3)		SECN+	9,614	29–3	10–1
April 6 (DH-2)^{†}	Missouri	No. 2	Baum–Walker Stadium	**W** 16–2 (7)	**Foutch** (2–0)	Neubeck (0–1)		SECN+	9,614	30–3	11–1
April 8	Arkansas State	No. 1	Baum–Walker Stadium	**W** 7–3	**Carter** (4–0)	Turner (1–4)		SEC Network	9,771	31–3	—
April 11	at No. 7 Georgia	No. 1	Foley Field; Athens, Georgia	**W** 13–3	**Jimenez** (4–0)	Quinn (0–1)		SECN+	3,633	32–3	12–1
April 12	at No. 7 Georgia	No. 1	Foley Field	**L** 6–7	Smith (3–1)	**Gaeckle** (2–1)	Hoskins (2)	SECN+	3,633	32–4	12–2
April 13	at No. 7 Georgia	No. 1	Foley Field	**L** 6–7 (12)	Zeldin (2–1)	**Gibler** (1–1)		SECN+	3,633	32–5	12–3
April 15	Arkansas–Pine Bluff	No. 2	Baum–Walker Stadium	**W** 13–3 (8)	**McGuire** (2–2)	Bedgood (0–3)		SECN+	9,432	33–5	—
April 17	Texas A&M	No. 2	Baum–Walker Stadium	**L** 4–7	Moss (5–2)	**Root** (5–2)		SEC Network	10,915	33–6	12–4
April 18 (DH-1)^{‡}	Texas A&M	No. 2	Baum–Walker Stadium	**W** 11–5	**Gaeckle** (3–1)	Lamkin (3–4)		SECN+	10,119	34–6	13–4
April 18 (DH-2)^{‡}	Texas A&M	No. 2	Baum–Walker Stadium	**L** 2–9	Jackson (1–0)	**Jimenez** (4–1)		SECN+	10,915	34–7	13–5
April 22	Little Rock	No. 5	Baum–Walker Stadium	**W** 10–0 (7)	**McGuire** (3–2)	Busick (1–1)		SECN+	9,821	35–7	—
April 23	Little Rock	No. 5	Baum–Walker Stadium	**W** 4–0	**Eaves** (1–0)	Burkey (0–1)		SEC Network	9,542	36–7	—
April 25	at Florida	No. 5	Condron Ballpark; Gainesville, Florida	**L** 4–6	Peterson (7–2)	**Root** (5–3)	Clemente (4)	SECN+	6,542	36–8	13–6
April 26	at Florida	No. 5	Condron Ballpark	**W** 7–0	**Gaeckle** (4–1)	King (4–2)		SEC Network	6,081	37–8	14–6
April 27	at Florida	No. 5	Condron Ballpark	**L** 5–9	McNeillie (4–2)	**Wiggins** (1–1)	Clemente (5)	SECN+	5,681	37–9	14–7
April 29	at Missouri State	No. 11	Hammons Field; Springfield, Missouri	Canceled due to forecasted inclement weather							
^{†}Rescheduled as a doubleheader of seven-inning games due to inclement weather on Friday, April 4 • ^{‡}Rescheduled as a doubleheader of nine-inning games due to inclement weather forecasted for Saturday, April 19

May (6–3)
Date	Opponent	Rank	Site/stadium	Score	Win	Loss	Save	TV	Attendance	Overall record	SEC record
May 1	No. 1 Texas	No. 11	Baum–Walker Stadium	**W** 9–0	**Root** (6–3)	Riojas (8–2)		ESPN2	10,855	38–9	15–7
May 2	No. 1 Texas	No. 11	Baum–Walker Stadium	**W** 6–1	**Wood** (1–0)	Harrison (4–1)		SEC Network	11,074	39–9	16–7
May 3	No. 1 Texas	No. 11	Baum–Walker Stadium	**W** 13–8	**Carter** (5–0)	Burns (0–2)		SECN+	11,031	40–9	17–7
May 9	at No. 3 LSU	No. 7	Alex Box Stadium, Skip Bertman Field; Baton Rouge, Louisiana	**L** 5–6 (10)	Cowan (3–2)	**Gaeckle** (4–2)		SECN+	11,658	40–10	17–8
May 10	at No. 3 LSU	No. 7	Alex Box Stadium, Skip Bertman Field	**L** 3–13 (7)	Eyanson (8–2)	**Wood** (1–1)		SEC Network	12,264	40–11	17–9
May 11	at No. 3 LSU	No. 7	Alex Box Stadium, Skip Bertman Field	**W** 7–4	**Carter** (6–0)	Evans (3–1)	**Coil** (1)	SEC Network	11,079	41–11	18–9
May 15	No. 17 Tennessee	No. 8	Baum–Walker Stadium	**L** 7–10	Russell (1–1)	**Root** (6–4)		SECN+	10,693	41–12	18–10
May 16	No. 17 Tennessee	No. 8	Baum–Walker Stadium	**W** 8–6	**Gibler** (2–1)	Doyle (9–3)	**Foutch** (4)	SECN+	10,925	42–12	19–10
May 17	No. 17 Tennessee	No. 8	Baum–Walker Stadium	**W** 8–4	**Wood** (2–1)	Kuhns (2–3)	**McEntire** (2)	SECN+	10,925	43–12	20–10

Postseason (7–3)

SEC Tournament (0–1)
Date	Opponent	Rank	Site/stadium	Score	Win	Loss	Save	TV	Attendance	Overall record	SECT record
May 23	(7) No. 17 Ole Miss	(2) No. 5	Hoover Metropolitan Stadium; Hoover, Alabama	**L** 2–5	Maddox (6–5)	**Root** (6–5)	Spencer (6)	SEC Network	13,627	43–13	0–1

Fayetteville Regional (3–0)
Date	Opponent	(Seed) Rank	Site/stadium	Score	Win	Loss	Save	TV	Attendance	Overall record	NCAAT record
May 30	(4) North Dakota State	(1) No. 6	Baum–Walker Stadium	**W** 6–2	**Coil** (3–0)	Johnson (4–6)		ESPN+	9,994	44–13	1–0
May 31	(3) Creighton	(1) No. 6	Baum–Walker Stadium	**W** 12–1	**Root** (7–5)	Magers (6–3)		ESPN+	10,115	45–13	2–0
June 1	(3) Creighton	(1) No. 6	Baum–Walker Stadium	**W** 8–3	**Wood** (3–1)	Latrell (7–2)	**Gaeckle** (1)	SEC Network	9,946	46–13	3–0

Fayetteville Super Regional (2–0)
Date	Opponent	(Nat'l Seed) Rank	Site/stadium	Score	Win	Loss	Save	TV	Attendance	Overall record	NCAAT record
June 7	(14) No. 16 Tennessee	(3) No. 6	Baum–Walker Stadium	**W** 4–3	**Root** (8–5)	Phillips (4–5)	**Gaeckle** (2)	ESPN	10,205	47–13	4–0
June 8	(14) No. 16 Tennessee	(3) No. 6	Baum–Walker Stadium	**W** 11–4	**Gibler** (3–1)	Doyle (10–4)		ESPN	10,273	48–13	5–0

Men's College World Series (2–2)
Date	Opponent	(Nat'l Seed) Rank	Site/stadium	Score	Win	Loss	Save	TV	Attendance	Overall record	CWS record
June 14	(6) No. 3 LSU	(3) No. 6	Charles Schwab Field Omaha; Omaha, Nebraska	**L** 1–4	Anderson (11–1)	**Root** (8–6)	Evans (7)	ESPN	25,464	48–14	0–1
June 16	Murray State	(3) No. 6	Charles Schwab Field Omaha	**W** 3–0	**Wood** (4–1) **CG/NH**	Silva (9–3)		ESPN	24,074	49–14	1–1
June 17	(15) No. 13 UCLA	(3) No. 6	Charles Schwab Field Omaha	**W** 7–3	**Root** (9–6)	Delvecchio (1–4)		ESPN	24,171	50–14	2–1
June 18	(6) No. 3 LSU	(3) No. 6	Charles Schwab Field Omaha	**L** 5–6	Mayers (2–0)	**Gibler** (3–2)		ESPN	25,740	50–15	2–2

- Win
- Loss
- Postponement or cancellation
- Bold: Arkansas player
- Rankings from D1Baseball.com.
- (#) Tournament seedings in parentheses.

== Statistics ==
=== Record vs. conference opponents ===
Blank are not scheduled. Blue are home games, otherwise away.

2025 SEC baseball records Source: 2025 SEC baseball game results, 2025 SEC baseball schedule
Tm	W–L	ALA	ARK	AUB	FLA	UGA	KEN	LSU	MSU	MIZ	OKL	OMS	SCA	TEN	TEX	TAM	VAN	Tm	SR	SW
ALA	16–14		.	1–2	1–2	2–1	.	1–2	1–2	3–0	2–1	.	.	1–2	.	3–0	1–2	ALA	4–6	2–0
ARK	20–10	.		.	1–2	1–2	.	1–2	.	3–0	.	2–1	3–0	2–1	3–0	1–2	3–0	ARK	6–4	4–0
AUB	17–13	2–1	.		.	0–3	2–1	3–0	2–1	.	.	1–2	3–0	2–1	0–3	.	2–1	AUB	7–3	2–2
FLA	15–15	2–1	2–1	.		0–3	.	.	2–1	3–0	.	1–2	3–0	0–3	2–1	.	0–3	FLA	6–4	2–3
UGA	18–12	1–2	2–1	3–0	3–0		2–1	.	.	3–0	2–1	.	.	.	0–3	2–1	0–3	UGA	7–3	3–2
KEN	13–17	.	.	1–2	.	1–2		.	0–3	.	3–0	1–2	2–1	2–1	1–2	2–1	0–3	KEN	4–6	1–2
LSU	19–11	2–1	2–1	0–3	.	.	.		3–0	3–0	3–0	.	2–1	2–1	1–2	1–2	.	LSU	7–3	3–1
MSU	15–15	2–1	.	1–2	1–2	.	3–0	0–3		3–0	1–2	2–1	2–1	.	0–3	.	.	MSU	5–5	2–2
MIZ	3–27	0–3	0–3	.	0–3	0–3	.	0–3	0–3		0–3	0–3	.	.	0–3	3–0	.	MIZ	1–9	1–9
OKL	14–16	1–2	.	.	.	1–2	0–3	0–3	2–1	3–0		2–1	2–1	.	1–2	.	2–1	OKL	5–5	1–2
OMS	16–14	.	1–2	2–1	2–1	.	2–1	.	1–2	3–0	1–2		1–2	1–2	.	.	2–1	OMS	5–5	1–0
SCA	6–24	.	0–3	0–3	0–3	.	1–2	1–2	1–2	.	1–2	2–1		0–3	.	0–3	.	SCA	1–9	0–5
TEN	16–14	2–1	1–2	1–2	3–0	.	1–2	1–2	.	.	.	2–1	3–0		.	1–2	1–2	TEN	4–6	2–0
TEX	22–8	.	0–3	3–0	1–2	3–0	2–1	2–1	3–0	3–0	2–1	.	.	.		3–0	.	TEX	8–2	5–1
TAM	11–19	0–3	2–1	.	.	1–2	1–2	2–1	.	0–3	.	.	3–0	2–1	0–3		0–3	TAM	4–6	1–4
VAN	19–11	2–1	0–3	1–2	3–0	3–0	3–0	.	.	.	1–2	1–2	.	2–1	.	3–0		VAN	6–4	4–1
Tm	W–L	ALA	ARK	AUB	FLA	UGA	KEN	LSU	MSU	MIZ	OKL	OMS	SCA	TEN	TEX	TAM	VAN	Team	SR	SW

Updated for entire regular season.
Tiebreakers: LSU over Vanderbilt (comparing results vs. Arkansas), Ole Miss over Tennessee and Alabama (comparing results vs. Vanderbilt), Tennessee over Alabama (using head-to-head result), Florida over Mississippi State (using head-to-head result).

=== Cumulative linescore ===
	1	2	3	4	5	6	7	8	9	10	11	12	Total
Arkansas	50	65	81	95	83	51	46	35	27	5	1	0	539
Opponents	39	36	28	29	32	25	28	7	24	4	1	1	254

== Rankings ==
Ranking movements Legend: ██ Increase in ranking ██ Decrease in ranking ( ) = First-place votes
	Week																	
Poll	Pre	1	2	3	4	5	6	7	8	9	10	11	12	13	14	15	16	Final
Coaches'	5	5*	4	3	3	3	2 (6)	2	1 (26)	2 (5)	4 (1)	5	2 (10)	5 (2)	4 (1)	5 (1)		
Baseball America	4	4	4	3	3	3	2	2	1	4	7	10	3	7	4	4*		
NCBWA†	5	4	4	6	5	3	1	2	1	4	6	6	1	5	5	5		
D1Baseball	5	5	4	3	3	3	2	2	1	2	5	11	7	8	5	6		
Perfect Game	13	12	11	10	8	7	4	3	1	4	6	12	2	7	5	5*		

† NCBWA ranks 30 teams in their preseason poll, but only ranks 25 teams weekly during the season.
* A new poll was not released for this week, so for comparison purposes, the previous week's ranking is inserted in this week's slot.
