= 2025 Mississippi State Bulldogs baseball team =

American college baseball season

2025 Mississippi State Bulldogs baseball

Tallahassee Regional, 2–2
- Conference: Southeastern Conference
- Record: 36–23 (15–15 SEC)
- Head coach: Chris Lemonis; Justin Parker (interim)
- Assistant coaches: Justin Parker (until April 28); Jake Gautreau
- Home stadium: Dudy Noble Field

2025 Southeastern Conference baseball standings
	Conf.				Overall
Team	W		L	PCT	W		L	PCT
No. 17 Texas ‍†‍‍^{y}	22	–	8	.733	44	–	14	.759
No. 3 Arkansas ‍‍‍^{y}	20	–	10	.667	50	–	15	.769
No. 1 LSU ‍‍‍^{y}	19	–	11	.633	53	–	15	.779
No. 18 Vanderbilt ‍‍‡‍^{y}	19	–	11	.633	43	–	18	.705
No. 19 Georgia ‍‍‍^{y}	18	–	12	.600	43	–	17	.717
No. 11 Auburn ‍‍‍^{y}	17	–	13	.567	41	–	20	.672
No. 21 Ole Miss ‍‍‍^{y}	16	–	14	.533	43	–	21	.672
No. 12 Tennessee ‍‍‍^{y}	16	–	14	.533	46	–	19	.708
Alabama ‍‍‍^{y}	16	–	14	.533	41	–	18	.695
Florida ‍‍‍^{y}	15	–	15	.500	39	–	22	.639
Mississippi State ‍‍‍^{y}	15	–	15	.500	36	–	23	.610
Oklahoma ‍‍‍^{y}	14	–	16	.467	38	–	22	.633
Kentucky ‍‍‍^{y}	13	–	17	.433	31	–	26	.544
Texas A&M ‍‍‍	11	–	19	.367	30	–	26	.536
South Carolina ‍‍‍	6	–	24	.200	28	–	29	.491
Missouri ‍‍‍	3	–	27	.100	16	–	39	.291
† – Conference champion ‡ – Tournament champion y – Invited to the NCAA Tournament; As of June 22, 2025; Rankings from D1Baseball

The 2025 Mississippi State Bulldogs baseball team represented Mississippi State University in the 2025 NCAA Division I baseball season. The Bulldogs played their home games at Dudy Noble Field, led by head coach Chris Lemonis.

== Previous season ==
The Bulldogs finished 40–23 and 17–13 in the Southeastern Conference (SEC) to finish 3rd place in the West. They went on to play in the Charlottesville Regional of the 2024 NCAA Division I baseball tournament, and were knocked out in the regional final by Virginia.

== Preseason ==
=== SEC Awards and honors ===
In February, the SEC named its 2025 Preseason All-SEC Teams and awards.

Preseason All-SEC Team
Player	No.	Position	Team	Class
Hunter Hines	44	1B	First	Senior

=== SEC Coaches' Poll ===
In the SEC Preseason Coaches' Poll released in February, the team was predicted to finish ninth in the SEC.

Coaches' Poll
Prediction	Team	Votes (1st)
1	Texas A&M	228 (10)
2	Tennessee	215 (1)
3	Arkansas	214 (3)
4	LSU	204 (1)
5	Florida	183 (1)
6	Georgia	165
7	Vanderbilt	156
8	Texas	146
9	Mississippi State	112
10	Kentucky	102
11	Oklahoma	101
12	Auburn	100
13	Alabama	98
14	South Carolina	61
15	Ole Miss	60
16	Missouri	31

2025 Mississippi State Bulldogs baseball team
Players
Coaches

#	Pos.	Name	B/T	Height	Weight	Year	Home town
2	INF	Sawyer Reeves	R/R	6 ft 3 in (1.91 m)	205 lb (93 kg)	Sr	(South Carolina) Lugoff
3	INF	Ace Reese	L/R	6 ft 3 in (1.91 m)	205 lb (93 kg)	So	(Texas) Canton
5	UTL	Aaron Downs	R/R	6 ft 0 in (1.83 m)	210 lb (95 kg)	Sr	(Iowa) Pella
6	OF	Landis Davila	L/R	6 ft 3 in (1.91 m)	200 lb (91 kg)	Fr	(Tennessee) Farragut
7	INF	Reed Stallman	L/R	6 ft 3 in (1.91 m)	220 lb (100 kg)	Sr	(Iowa) Robins
8	LHP	Charlie Foster	R/L	6 ft 3 in (1.91 m)	190 lb (86 kg)	Fr	(Georgia (U.S. state)) Snellville
9	LHP	Pico Kohn	L/L	6 ft 4 in (1.93 m)	200 lb (91 kg)	Sr	(Alabama) Verbena
10	INF	Dylan Cupp	R/R	6 ft 1 in (1.85 m)	200 lb (91 kg)	So	(Georgia (U.S. state)) Cedartown
11	RHP	Duke Stone	L/R	6 ft 5 in (1.96 m)	225 lb (102 kg)	Fr	(Georgia (U.S. state)) Uvalda
12	RHP	Evan Siary	R/R	6 ft 1 in (1.85 m)	205 lb (93 kg)	Jr	(Mississippi) Columbus
13	INF	Nate Chester	R/R	6 ft 2 in (1.88 m)	190 lb (86 kg)	Sr	(Missouri) Kansas City
14	RHP	Cade O'Leary	R/R	6 ft 4 in (1.93 m)	190 lb (86 kg)	Fr	(Tennessee) Knoxville
15	LHP	Luke Dotson	L/L	6 ft 4 in (1.93 m)	210 lb (95 kg)	Sr	(Georgia (U.S. state)) Marietta
16	UTL	Braden Booth	R/R	6 ft 2 in (1.88 m)	200 lb (91 kg)	Fr	(Alabama) Madison
17	RHP	Stone Simmons	R/R	6 ft 4 in (1.93 m)	235 lb (107 kg)	Gr	(Texas) Houston
18	UTL	Noah Sullivan	R/R	6 ft 1 in (1.85 m)	225 lb (102 kg)	Sr	(Florida) Orlando
19	LHP	Robert Fortenberry	L/L	6 ft 0 in (1.83 m)	220 lb (100 kg)	Jr	Texas
22	C	Ross Highfill	R/R	6 ft 0 in (1.83 m)	200 lb (91 kg)	Jr	(Mississippi) Madison
23	C	Jackson Owen	R/R	5 ft 10 in (1.78 m)	200 lb (91 kg)	Sr	(Mississippi) Starkville
25	LHP	Bradley Loftin	L/L	6 ft 3 in (1.91 m)	200 lb (91 kg)	Jr	(Mississippi) Southaven
26	RHP	Chase Hungate	L/R	6 ft 1 in (1.85 m)	175 lb (79 kg)	Sr	(Virginia) Abingdon
27	RHP	Gavin Black	L/R	6 ft 0 in (1.83 m)	195 lb (88 kg)	Jr	(Georgia (U.S. state)) Bogart
28	RHP	Ryan McPherson	R/R	6 ft 3 in (1.91 m)	205 lb (93 kg)	Fr	(Florida) Hollywood
29	RHP	Nate Williams	R/R	6 ft 4 in (1.93 m)	250 lb (113 kg)	Sr	(Georgia (U.S. state)) Acworth
30	RHP	Jacob Pruitt	R/R	6 ft 1 in (1.85 m)	185 lb (84 kg)	Jr	(Indiana) Yorktown
31	RHP	Karson Ligon	R/R	6 ft 2 in (1.88 m)	205 lb (93 kg)	Sr	(Florida) Sarasota
32	OF	Michael O'Brien	L/L	6 ft 0 in (1.83 m)	185 lb (84 kg)	Sr	(Louisiana) River Ridge
34	INF	Gehrig Frei	S/R	6 ft 1 in (1.85 m)	200 lb (91 kg)	Sr	(Georgia (U.S. state)) Alpharetta
35	UTL	Ben Davis	R/R	6 ft 3 in (1.91 m)	215 lb (98 kg)	Jr	(Mississippi) Booneville
36	UTL	Nolan Stevens	L/L	6 ft 4 in (1.93 m)	210 lb (95 kg)	So	(California) Elk Grove
38	OF	Bryce Chance	R/R	5 ft 10 in (1.78 m)	180 lb (82 kg)	Sr	(Mississippi) Ridgeland
42	RHP	Jack Gleason	R/R	6 ft 1 in (1.85 m)	180 lb (82 kg)	Fr	(Tennessee) Germantown
43	UTL	Steven Spalitta	L/R	6 ft 0 in (1.83 m)	185 lb (84 kg)	So	(Louisiana) Mandeville
44	UTL	Hunter Hines	L/R	6 ft 3 in (1.91 m)	210 lb (95 kg)	Sr	(Mississippi) Madison
45	LHP	Dane Burns	R/L	6 ft 5 in (1.96 m)	220 lb (100 kg)	Fr	(Texas) Celina
47	RHP	JT Schnoor	R/R	6 ft 4 in (1.93 m)	215 lb (98 kg)	Jr	(Mississippi) Pascagoula
48	RHP	Kevin Mannell	R/R	6 ft 4 in (1.93 m)	210 lb (95 kg)	Jr	(Kansas) Topeka
49	UTL	Gatlin Sanders	L/R	5 ft 11 in (1.8 m)	175 lb (79 kg)	Jr	(Mississippi) Madison
52	INF	Lukas Buckner	L/R	5 ft 9 in (1.75 m)	170 lb (77 kg)	Fr	(Tennessee) Knoxville
55	C	Joe Powell	R/R	5 ft 10 in (1.78 m)	185 lb (84 kg)	Gr	(Ohio) Mason

Head coach

Chris Lemonis

Assistant coach(es)

Justin Parker
Jake Gautreau
Kyle Cheesebrough

Legend

- (C) Team captain
- (S) Suspended
- (I) Ineligible
- Injured
- Current redshirt

Roster
Last update: October 9, 2025

== Offseason ==
=== 2024 MLB draft ===
Several Mississippi State players from the previous 2024 Mississippi State Bulldogs baseball season were selected in the 2024 MLB draft and departed the team ahead of the 2025 regular season.

Round	Overall pick	Player	Position	MLB Team	Source
1	15	Jurrangelo Cijntje	Pitcher	Seattle Mariners	
2	59	Khal Stephen	Pitcher	Toronto Blue Jays	
3	82	Nate Dohm	Pitcher	New York Mets	
4	116	Dakota Jordan	Outfielder	San Francisco Giants	
6	190	Brooks Auger	Pitcher	Los Angeles Dodgers	
9	277	Colby Holcombe	Pitcher	Toronto Blue Jays	
12	365	Tyson Hardin	Pitcher	Milwaukee Brewers	
13	396	Connor Hujsak	Outfielder	Tampa Bay Rays	
15	437	Tyler Davis	Pitcher	Kansas City Royals	
18	532	David Mershon	Shortstop	Los Angeles Angels	
19	565	Cam Schuelke	Pitcher	Cleveland Guardians	

== Schedule and results ==
2025 Mississippi State Bulldogs baseball game log
Regular season (34–20)

February (7–2)
Date	Opponent	Rank	Site/stadium	Score	Win	Loss	Save	TV	Attendance	Overall record	SEC record
February 14	Manhattan (DH-1)	No. 18	Dudy Noble Field • Starkville, MS	**W** 17–3^{7}	**Pico Kohn (1–0)**	Braedon Romero (0–1)	–	SECN+	10,794	1–0	–
February 14	Manhattan (DH-2)	No. 18	Dudy Noble Field • Starkville, MS	**W** 13–1^{7}	**Karson Ligon (1–0)**	Brad Grasser (0–1)	–	SECN+	10,794	2–0	–
February 15	Manhattan	No. 18	Dudy Noble Field • Starkville, MS	**moved to February 14, impending weather**							
February 16	Manhattan	No. 18	Dudy Noble Field • Starkville, MS	**W** 5–1	**Stone Simmons (1–0)**	Joseph Duffield (0–1)	–	SECN+	9,791	3–0	–
February 18	at Southern Miss	No. 18	Pete Taylor Park • Hattiesburg, MS	**L** 0–3	Colby Allen (1–0)	**Charlie Foster (0–1)**	Landen Payne (1)	ESPN+	5,741	3–1	–
February 21	Missouri State	No. 18	Dudy Noble Field • Starkville, MS	**W** 3–1	**Dane Burns (1–0)**	Max Knight (0–1)	**Luke Dotson (1)**	SECN+	9,420	4–1	–
February 22	Missouri State	No. 18	Dudy Noble Field • Starkville, MS	**W** 9–3	**Ryan McPherson (1–0)**	Jackson Holmes (0–2)	–	SECN+	11,072	5–1	–
February 23	Missouri State	No. 18	Dudy Noble Field • Starkville, MS	**W** 6–4	**Stone Simmons (2–0)**	Tyler Charlton (1–1)	**Chase Hungate (1)**	SECN+	9,578	6–1	–
February 25	No. 21 Troy	No. 18	Dudy Noble Field • Starkville, MS	**L** 5–6	Grady Gorgen (1–0)	**Ben Davis (0–1)**	–	SECN+	9,915	6–2	–
Astros Foundation College Classic
February 28	vs. Rice	No. 18	Daikin Park • Houston, TX	**W** 14–3^{7}	**Pico Kohn (2–0)**	Davion Hickson (0–1)	–	Astros.com	11,502	7–2	–

March (9–10)
Date	Opponent	Rank	Site/stadium	Score	Win	Loss	Save	TV	Attendance	Overall record	SEC record
March 1	vs. Arizona	No. 18	Daikin Park • Houston, TX	**L** 5–6	Owen Kramkowski (1–1)	**Karson Ligon (1–1)**	Tony Pluta (1)	Astros.com	16,226	7–3	–
March 2	vs. Oklahoma State	No. 18	Daikin Park • Houston, TX	**L** 7–9	Hunter Watkins (2–0)	**Stone Simmons (2–1)**	Sean Youngerman (1)	Astros.com	–	7–4	–
March 4	No. 20 Southern Miss	–	Dudy Noble Field • Starkville, MS	**moved to March 5, impending weather**							
March 5	No. 20 Southern Miss	–	Dudy Noble Field • Starkville, MS	**W** 18–3^{7}	**Chase Hungate (1–0)**	Chandler Best (0–1)	–	SECN+	8,295	8–4	–
March 7	Queens	–	Dudy Noble Field • Starkville, MS	**W** 9–3	**Pico Kohn (3–0)**	Landry Jurecka (0–3)	–	SECN+	10,388	9–4	–
March 8	Queens	–	Dudy Noble Field • Starkville, MS	**W** 10–2	**Ben Davis (1–1)**	Adrian Quezada (0–3)	–	SECN+	10,456	10–4	–
March 9	Queens	–	Dudy Noble Field • Starkville, MS	**W** 9–3	**Karson Ligon (2–1)**	Jack Renaud (0–1)	–	SECN+	9,245	11–4	–
Hancock Whitney Classic
March 11	vs. Old Dominion	–	Keesler Federal Park • Biloxi, MS	**W** 9–4	**Mikhai Grant (1–0)**	Cole Lanford (0–1)	–	SECN+	4,403	12–4	–
March 12	vs. Nicholls	–	Keesler Federal Park • Biloxi, MS	**W** 2–1	**Nolan Stevens (1–0)**	Harper Jordan (2–2)	**Ryan McPherson (1)**	SECN+	4,001	13–4	–
March 14	No. 11 Texas	–	Dudy Noble Field • Starkville, MS	**L** 7–8	Andre Duplantier II (2–0)	**Chase Hungate (1–1)**	Dylan Volantis (2)	SECN+	11,238	13–5	0–1
March 15	No. 11 Texas	–	Dudy Noble Field • Starkville, MS	**postponed to March 16, impending weather**							
March 16	No. 11 Texas (DH-1)	–	Dudy Noble Field • Starkville, MS	**L** 3–5^{7}	Ruger Riojas (4–0)	**Nate Williams (0–1)**	Dylan Volantis (3)	SECN	11,961	13–6	0–2
March 16	No. 11 Texas (DH-2)	–	Dudy Noble Field • Starkville, MS	**L** 1–4^{7}	Jason Flores (2–0)	**Karson Ligon (2–2)**	Max Grubbs (4)	SECN+	11,961	13–7	0–3
March 18	Jackson State	–	Dudy Noble Field • Starkville, MS	**W** 16–3^{7}	**Kevin Mannell (1–0)**	Erick Gonzalez (3–1)	–	SECN+	9,485	14–7	–
March 21	at No. 10 Oklahoma	–	L. Dale Mitchell Baseball Park • Norman, OK	**W** 2–1	**Pico Kohn (4–0)**	Kyson Witherspoon (5–1)	**Luke Dotson (2)**	SECN+	3,539	15–7	1–3
March 22	at No. 10 Oklahoma	–	L. Dale Mitchell Baseball Park • Norman, OK	**L** 11–13	Dylan Crooks (2–0)	**Nate Williams (0–2)**	–	SECN+	4,161	15–8	1–4
March 23	at No. 10 Oklahoma	–	L. Dale Mitchell Baseball Park • Norman, OK	**L** 3–7	Jason Bodin (2–0)	**Karson Ligon (2–3)**	Dylan Crooks (7)	SECN+	3,194	15–9	1–5
March 25	Samford	–	Dudy Noble Field • Starkville, MS	**W** 6–1	**Kevin Mannell (2–0)**	Brooks Rice (0–2)	–	SECN+	9,996	16–9	–
March 27	at No. 8 LSU	–	Alex Box Stadium, Skip Bertman Field • Baton Rouge, LA	**L** 6–8	Connor Benge (1–1)	**Dane Burns (1–1)**	Zac Cowan (3)	SECN	11,192	16–10	1–6
March 28	at No. 8 LSU	–	Alex Box Stadium, Skip Bertman Field • Baton Rouge, LA	**L** 1–2	Anthony Eyanson (4–0)	**Pico Kohn (4–1)**	Cavan Evans (5)	SECN+	11,507	16–11	1–7
March 29	at No. 8 LSU	–	Alex Box Stadium, Skip Bertman Field • Baton Rouge, LA	**L** 8–17	Conner Ware (4–0)	**Karson Ligon (2–4)**	–	SECN+	11,303	16–12	1–8

April (10–7)
Date	Opponent	Rank	Site/stadium	Score	Win	Loss	Save	TV	Attendance	Overall record	SEC record
April 1	at Memphis	–	FedExPark • Memphis, TN	**W** 5–3	**Ryan McPherson (2–0)**	Hayden Donahue (0–2)	**Stone Simmons (1)**	ESPN+	1,511	17–12	–
April 4	South Carolina	–	Dudy Noble Field • Starkville, MS	**L** 3–7	Jake McCoy (3–3)	**Ben Davis (1–2)**	Brendan Sweeney (5)	SECN+	11,983	17–13	1–9
April 5	South Carolina	–	Dudy Noble Field • Starkville, MS	**W** 11–4	**Chase Hungate (2–1)**	Jarvis Evans Jr. (3–1)	–	SECN+	12,132	18–13	2–9
April 6	South Carolina	–	Dudy Noble Field • Starkville, MS	**W** 6–0	**Karson Ligon (3–4)**	Brandon Stone (1–4)	**Stone Simmons (2)**	SECN+	9,943	19–13	3–9
April 8	at UAB	–	Young Memorial Field • Birmingham, AL	**W** 8–3	**Ryan McPherson (3–0)**	Brock Hill (1–1)	–	ESPN+	267	20–13	–
April 11	at No. 12 Alabama	–	Sewell–Thomas Stadium • Tuscaloosa, AL	**W** 13–3^{8}	**Stone Simmons (3–1)**	Zane Adams (4–2)	–	SECN+	4,882	21–13	4–9
April 12	at No. 12 Alabama	–	Sewell–Thomas Stadium • Tuscaloosa, AL	**L** 1–4	Riley Quick (5–1)	**Evan Siary (0–1)**	Carson Ozmer (11)	SECN+	5,800	21–14	4–10
April 13	at No. 12 Alabama	–	Sewell–Thomas Stadium • Tuscaloosa, AL	**W** 4–2	**Nate Williams (1–2)**	Braylon Myers (2–1)	–	SECN+	4,619	22–14	5–10
April 15	Southern	–	Dudy Noble Field • Starkville, MS	**W** 16–2^{7}	**Ryan McPherson (4–0)**	Jeremiah Newman (0–2)	–	SECN+	9,625	23–14	–
April 18	Florida	–	Dudy Noble Field • Starkville, MS	**L** 3–13^{8}	Liam Peterson (6–2)	**Stone Simmons (3–2)**	–	SECN	11,925	23–15	5–11
April 19	Florida	–	Dudy Noble Field • Starkville, MS	**L** 8–11	Alex Philpott (3–3)	**Nate Williams (1–3)**	Jake Clemente (3)	ESPN	11,413	23–16	5–12
April 20	Florida	–	Dudy Noble Field • Starkville, MS	**W** 14–8	**Karson Ligon (4–4)**	Luke McNeillie (3–2)	–	ESPN2	9,699	24–16	6–12
April 22	vs No. 23 Ole Miss; Governor's Cup	–	Trustmark Park • Pearl, MS	**L** 7–8^{10}	Hudson Calhoun (3–0)	**Luke Dotson (0–1)**	–	SECN+	–	24–17	–
April 25	at No. 11 Auburn	–	Plainsman Park • Auburn, AL	**L** 5–6	Carson Myers (1–2)	**Pico Kohn (4–2)**	Ryan Hetzler (5)	SECN+	5,866	24–18	6–13
April 26	at No. 11 Auburn	–	Plainsman Park • Auburn, AL	**W** 12–7	**Evan Siary (1–1)**	Cade Fisher (1–2)	–	SECN+	6,484	25–18	7–13
April 27	at No. 11 Auburn	–	Plainsman Park • Auburn, AL	**L** 8–14	Carson Myers (2–2)	**Karson Ligon (4–5)**	–	SECN+	5,329	25–19	7–14
April 29	Memphis	–	Dudy Noble Field • Starkville, MS	**W** 18–5^{7}	**Jacob Pruitt (1–0)**	Caden Robinson (1–3)	–	SECN+	9,748	26–19	–

May (8–1)
Date	Opponent	Rank	Site/stadium	Score	Win	Loss	Save	TV	Attendance	Overall record	SEC record
Super Bulldog Weekend
May 2	Kentucky	–	Dudy Noble Field • Starkville, MS	**moved to May 3, impending weather**							
May 3	Kentucky (DH-1)	–	Dudy Noble Field • Starkville, MS	**W** 14–4^{7}	**Pico Kohn (5–2)**	Nile Adcock (1–2)	**Ben Davis (1)**	SECN+	13,970	27–19	8–14
May 3	Kentucky (DH-2)	–	Dudy Noble Field • Starkville, MS	**W** 6–5^{11}	**Luke Dotson (1–1)**	Simon Gregersen (0–3)	–	SECN+	13,970	28–19	9–14
May 4	Kentucky	–	Dudy Noble Field • Starkville, MS	**W** 6–1	**Ben Davis (2–2)**	Ben Cleaver (5–3)	–	SECN	10,635	29–19	10–14
May 9	No. 24 Ole Miss (DH-1)	–	Dudy Noble Field • Starkville, MS	**L** 4–10	Hunter Elliott (7–3)	**Pico Kohn (5–3)**	–	SECN+	14,468	29–20	10–15
May 9	No. 24 Ole Miss (DH-2)	–	Dudy Noble Field • Starkville, MS	**W** 4–1	**Evan Siary (2–1)**	Riley Maddox (5–5)	–	SECN	14,468	30–20	11–15
May 10	No. 24 Ole Miss	–	Dudy Noble Field • Starkville, MS	**moved to May 9, impending weather**							
May 10	No. 24 Ole Miss	–	Dudy Noble Field • Starkville, MS	**W** 6–5	**Karson Ligon (5–5)**	Mason Nichols (3–2)	**Ryan McPherson (2)**	SECN+	11,641	31–20	12–15
May 11	No. 24 Ole Miss	–	Dudy Noble Field • Starkville, MS	**moved to May 10, impending weather**							
May 13	North Alabama	–	Dudy Noble Field • Starkville, MS	**canceled, impending weather**							
May 15	at Missouri	–	Taylor Stadium • Columbia, MO	**W** 25–7	**Stone Simmons (4–2)**	Brady Kehlenbrink (0–5)	**Nate Williams (1)**	SECN+	1,455	32–20	13–15
May 16	at Missouri	–	Taylor Stadium • Columbia, MO	**W** 13–3^{7}	**Ben Davis (3–2)**	Tony Neubeck (1–5)	–	SECN+	1,436	33–20	14–15
May 17	at Missouri	–	Taylor Stadium • Columbia, MO	**W** 12–1^{7}	**Karson Ligon (6–5)**	Josh McDevitt (0–2)	–	SECN+	1,668	34–20	15–15

Postseason (2–3)

SEC Tournament (0–1)
Date	Opponent	Seed/Rank	Site/stadium	Score	Win	Loss	Save	TV	Attendance	Overall record	SECT Record
May 20	(14) Texas A&M	(11)	Hoover Metropolitan Stadium • Hoover, AL	**postponed to May 21, impending weather**							
May 21	(14) Texas A&M	(11)	Hoover Metropolitan Stadium • Hoover, AL	**L** 0–9	Ryan Prager (5–0)	**Ryan McPherson (4–1)**	–	SECN	7,242	34–21	0–1

NCAA Tallahassee Regional (2–2)
Date	Opponent	Seed/Rank	Site/stadium	Score	Win	Loss	Save	TV	Attendance	Overall record	NCAAT record
May 30	vs. (2) No. 19 Northeastern	(3)	Dick Howser Stadium • Tallahassee, FL	**W** 11–2	**Ben Davis (4–2)**	Will Jones (11–1)	**Ryan McPherson (3)**	ESPN+	4,496	35–21	1–0
May 31	at (1) No. 7 Florida State	(3)	Dick Howser Stadium • Tallahassee, FL	**L** 3–10	Jamie Arnold (8–2)	**Pico Kohn (5–4)**	–	ESPN2	5,463	35–22	1–1
June 1	vs. (2) No. 19 Northeastern (DH-1)	(3)	Dick Howser Stadium • Tallahassee, FL	**W** 3–2	**Evan Siary (3–1)**	Aiven Cabral (10–3)	**Stone Simmons (3)**	ESPN+	4,393	36–22	2–1
June 1	at (1) No. 7 Florida State (DH-2)	(3)	Dick Howser Stadium • Tallahassee, FL	**L** 2–5	Wes Mendes (7–2)	**Luke Dotson (1–2)**	Joe Charles (4)	ACCN	5,222	36–23	2–2

Legend: = Win = Loss = Canceled
Bold = Mississippi State team member
Rankings are based on the team's current ranking in the D1Baseball poll.

== Record vs. conference opponents ==
Blank are not scheduled. Blue are home games, otherwise away.

2025 SEC baseball records Source: 2025 SEC baseball game results, 2025 SEC baseball schedule
Tm	W–L	ALA	ARK	AUB	FLA	UGA	KEN	LSU	MSU	MIZ	OKL	OMS	SCA	TEN	TEX	TAM	VAN	Tm	SR	SW
ALA	16–14		.	1–2	1–2	2–1	.	1–2	1–2	3–0	2–1	.	.	1–2	.	3–0	1–2	ALA	4–6	2–0
ARK	20–10	.		.	1–2	1–2	.	1–2	.	3–0	.	2–1	3–0	2–1	3–0	1–2	3–0	ARK	6–4	4–0
AUB	17–13	2–1	.		.	0–3	2–1	3–0	2–1	.	.	1–2	3–0	2–1	0–3	.	2–1	AUB	7–3	2–2
FLA	15–15	2–1	2–1	.		0–3	.	.	2–1	3–0	.	1–2	3–0	0–3	2–1	.	0–3	FLA	6–4	2–3
UGA	18–12	1–2	2–1	3–0	3–0		2–1	.	.	3–0	2–1	.	.	.	0–3	2–1	0–3	UGA	7–3	3–2
KEN	13–17	.	.	1–2	.	1–2		.	0–3	.	3–0	1–2	2–1	2–1	1–2	2–1	0–3	KEN	4–6	1–2
LSU	19–11	2–1	2–1	0–3	.	.	.		3–0	3–0	3–0	.	2–1	2–1	1–2	1–2	.	LSU	7–3	3–1
MSU	15–15	2–1	.	1–2	1–2	.	3–0	0–3		3–0	1–2	2–1	2–1	.	0–3	.	.	MSU	5–5	2–2
MIZ	3–27	0–3	0–3	.	0–3	0–3	.	0–3	0–3		0–3	0–3	.	.	0–3	3–0	.	MIZ	1–9	1–9
OKL	14–16	1–2	.	.	.	1–2	0–3	0–3	2–1	3–0		2–1	2–1	.	1–2	.	2–1	OKL	5–5	1–2
OMS	16–14	.	1–2	2–1	2–1	.	2–1	.	1–2	3–0	1–2		1–2	1–2	.	.	2–1	OMS	5–5	1–0
SCA	6–24	.	0–3	0–3	0–3	.	1–2	1–2	1–2	.	1–2	2–1		0–3	.	0–3	.	SCA	1–9	0–5
TEN	16–14	2–1	1–2	1–2	3–0	.	1–2	1–2	.	.	.	2–1	3–0		.	1–2	1–2	TEN	4–6	2–0
TEX	22–8	.	0–3	3–0	1–2	3–0	2–1	2–1	3–0	3–0	2–1	.	.	.		3–0	.	TEX	8–2	5–1
TAM	11–19	0–3	2–1	.	.	1–2	1–2	2–1	.	0–3	.	.	3–0	2–1	0–3		0–3	TAM	4–6	1–4
VAN	19–11	2–1	0–3	1–2	3–0	3–0	3–0	.	.	.	1–2	1–2	.	2–1	.	3–0		VAN	6–4	4–1
Tm	W–L	ALA	ARK	AUB	FLA	UGA	KEN	LSU	MSU	MIZ	OKL	OMS	SCA	TEN	TEX	TAM	VAN	Team	SR	SW

Updated for entire regular season.
Tie brkrs: LSU>VAN ARK common, OMS>TEN & OMS>ALA VAN common, TEN>ALA hd to hd, FLA>MSU hd to hd.

== Rankings ==
Ranking movements Legend: ██ Increase in ranking ██ Decrease in ranking — = Not ranked RV = Received votes
	Week																		
Poll	Pre	1	2	3	4	5	6	7	8	9	10	11	12	13	14	15	16	17	Final
Coaches'	19	19*	16	—	RV	—	RV	—	—	—	—	—	—	—	—	RV	RV*	RV*	RV
Baseball America	18	16	15	22	22	—	—	—	—	—	—	—	—	—	—	—*	—*	—*	—
NCBWA†	19	17	16	16	24	—	RV	—	—	RV	RV	RV	RV	RV	RV	RV	RV	RV*	RV
D1Baseball	18	18	18	—	—	—	—	—	—	—	—	—	—	—	—	—	—*	—*	—

† NCBWA ranks 30 teams in their preseason poll, but only ranks 25 teams weekly during the season.
* A new poll was not released for this week, so for comparison purposes, the previous week's ranking is inserted in this week's slot.
