= 2025 Missouri Tigers baseball team =

American college baseball season

2025 Missouri Tigers baseball
- Conference: Southeastern Conference
- Record: 16–39 (3–27 SEC)
- Head coach: Kerrick Jackson (2nd season)
- Assistant coach: Jabari Brown (2nd season)
- Hitting coach: Bryson LeBlanc (2nd season)
- Pitching coach: Tim Jamieson (23rd season)
- Home stadium: Ralph and Debbie Taylor Stadium

2025 Southeastern Conference baseball standings
	Conf.				Overall
Team	W		L	PCT	W		L	PCT
No. 17 Texas ‍†‍‍^{y}	22	–	8	.733	44	–	14	.759
No. 3 Arkansas ‍‍‍^{y}	20	–	10	.667	50	–	15	.769
No. 1 LSU ‍‍‍^{y}	19	–	11	.633	53	–	15	.779
No. 18 Vanderbilt ‍‍‡‍^{y}	19	–	11	.633	43	–	18	.705
No. 19 Georgia ‍‍‍^{y}	18	–	12	.600	43	–	17	.717
No. 11 Auburn ‍‍‍^{y}	17	–	13	.567	41	–	20	.672
No. 21 Ole Miss ‍‍‍^{y}	16	–	14	.533	43	–	21	.672
No. 12 Tennessee ‍‍‍^{y}	16	–	14	.533	46	–	19	.708
Alabama ‍‍‍^{y}	16	–	14	.533	41	–	18	.695
Florida ‍‍‍^{y}	15	–	15	.500	39	–	22	.639
Mississippi State ‍‍‍^{y}	15	–	15	.500	36	–	23	.610
Oklahoma ‍‍‍^{y}	14	–	16	.467	38	–	22	.633
Kentucky ‍‍‍^{y}	13	–	17	.433	31	–	26	.544
Texas A&M ‍‍‍	11	–	19	.367	30	–	26	.536
South Carolina ‍‍‍	6	–	24	.200	28	–	29	.491
Missouri ‍‍‍	3	–	27	.100	16	–	39	.291
† – Conference champion ‡ – Tournament champion y – Invited to the NCAA Tournament; As of June 22, 2025; Rankings from D1Baseball

The 2025 Missouri Tigers baseball team represented the University of Missouri during the 2025 NCAA Division I baseball season. The Tigers were coached by second-year head coach Kerrick Jackson and played their home games at Ralph and Debbie Taylor Stadium.

== Previous season ==
In 2024, Missouri finished with a record of 23–32 overall and a 9–21 SEC record, being one of only two SEC programs to post a losing record. The Tigers finished last in the SEC regular season and failed to qualify for the 2024 Southeastern Conference baseball tournament.

== Preseason ==
=== Preseason SEC awards and honors ===
No Missouri players were selected as preseason all-SEC players.

=== SEC coaches poll ===
The SEC Coaches poll was released on February 2, 2025. Missouri was predicted to finish last in the SEC.

SEC coaches poll
Predicted finish	Team	Votes (1st place)
1	Texas A&M	228 (10)
2	Tennessee	215 (1)
3	Arkansas	214 (3)
4	LSU	204 (1)
5	Florida	183 (1)
6	Georgia	165
7	Vanderbilt	156
8	Texas	146
9	Mississippi State	112
10	Kentucky	102
11	Oklahoma	101
12	Auburn	100
13	Alabama	98
14	South Carolina	61
15	Ole Miss	60
16	Missouri	31

== Previous season ==
=== 2024 MLB draft ===
The Tigers had 3 players drafted in the 2024 MLB draft.

Player	Position	Round	Overall	MLB Team
Ryan Magdic	Pitcher	14	406	Oakland Athletics
Carter Rustad	Pitcher	15	459	Baltimore Orioles
Bryce Mayer	Pitcher	16	493	Houston Astros

== Departures ==
Offseason departures
Name	Number	Pos.	Height	Weight	Year	Hometown	Notes
Juju Stevens	1	OF	6'0"	180 lbs	Junior	Woodbridge, CT	Transferred to Georgia Southern
Danny Corona	3	INF	6'3"	215 lbs	Junior	Brooklyn, NY	
Matt Garcia	4	INF	6'0"	190 lbs	Graduate	Orlando, FL	Graduated
Jeric Curtis	6	OF	6'0"	170 lbs	Sophomore	Cypress, TX	
Drew Culbertson	7	INF	6'0"	180 lbs	Freshman	Greenwood, IN	Transferred to Oklahoma State
Tucker Moore	8	C	6'1"	198 lbs	RS-Freshman	Castle Rock, CO	Transferred to Liberty
Jackson Beaman	10	OF	6'1"	230 lbs	Senior	Lincoln, MO	Transferred to Iowa
Jack Holubowski	11	INF	6'2"	205 lbs	Freshman	Chesterfield, MO	Transferred to East Central
Justin Colon	12	INF	6'3"	160 lbs	Junior	Carolina, PR	
Jacob Peaden	13	RHP	6'2"	200 lbs	Graduate	Greenville, NC	
Thomas Curry	17	C	5'11"	230 lbs	Freshman	Hartland, WI	Transferred to UIC
Trevor Austin	19	INF/OF	5'10"	188 lbs	Senior	Jefferson City, MO	Graduated; signed to play for the Houston Astros
RJ Jimerson	28	OF	5'10"	185 lbs	Sophomore	Chicago, IL	Transferred to Pepperdine
Victor Quinn	40	RHP	6'1"	217 lbs	Junior	O'Fallon, MO	
Ben Pedersen	47	RHP	6'6"	210 lbs	Graduate	Duluth, MN	
Logan Lunceford	48	RHP	6'0"	180 lbs	Sophomore	Edmond, OK	Transferred to Wake Forest
Miles Garrett	58	RHP	5'10"	175 lbs	Junior	Stone Mountain, GA	Transferred to VCU

== Transfer in ==
Offseason Transfers In
Name	Number	Pos.	Height	Weight	Year	Hometown	Notes
Peyton Basler	3	INF	6'0"	195 lbs	Junior	Lansing, KS	Transferred from Kansas City Kansas CC
Pierre Seals	5	OF	6'0"	210 lbs	Senior	Memphis, TN	Transferred from Memphis
Gehrig Goldbeck	10	INF	6'1"	175 lbs	Junior	Kansas City, KS	Transferred from Kansas City Kansas CC
Austin Henry	11	RHP	6'5"	220 lbs	Sophomore	Dell Rapids, SD	Transferred from Oklahoma
Keegan Knutson	19	INF	5'10"	195 lbs	Junior	Janesville, WI	Transferred from San Jacinto CC
Josh Kirchhoff	28	RHP	6'3"	210 lbs	Junior	Little Canada, MN	Transferred from Iowa Central CC
James Vaughn	29	RHP	6'5"	240 lbs	Graduate	New York, NY	Transferred from Columbia
Aeneas Clark	36	RHP	6'3"	205 lbs	Junior	Peoria, AZ	Transferred from South Mountain CC
Blake Simpson	38	INF	6'2"	185 lbs	Junior	Toronto, ON	Transferred from Connors State
Cayden Nicoletto	48	OF	6'0"	190 lbs	Senior	Perth, AUS	Transferred from Columbia College
Jaylen Merchant	51	RHP	6'0"	180 lbs	Sophomore	Grayson, GA	Transferred from USC Aiken

== Incoming Recruits ==
Missouri Recruits
Name	B/T	Pos.	Height	Weight	Hometown	High School	Source
Brady Picarelli	L/R	OF	6'2"	200 lbs	Eureka, MO	Eureka High School	
Christopher Patterson	R/R	INF	6'3"	190 lbs	Frisco, TX	Prestonwood Christian Academy	
Trey Lawrence	R/R	INF/RHP	6'3"	180 lbs	Palmetto, FL	Palmetto High School	
Clarence "Trey" Callaway	S/R	UTL	6'1"	215 lbs	Atlanta, GA	Dutchtown High School	
Victor Christal	R/R	RHP	6'0"	190 lbs	Raytown, MO	Bishop Miege High School	
Paul "PJ" Green	R/R	OF/RHP	6'2"	195 lbs	Tyrone, GA	Sandy Creek High School	
Aden Malpass	L/L	OF	6'0"	175 lbs	Hoover, AL	John Carroll Catholic High School	
Brady Kehlenbrink	R/L	LHP	6'2"	205 lbs	Ballwin, MO	Parkway South High School	

== Personnel ==
=== Starters ===
Lineup
Pos.	No.	Player.	Year
C	4	Jedier Hernandez	Senior
1B	88	Mateo Serna	Sophomore
2B	38	Blake Simpson	Junior
3B	18	Jackson Lovich	Junior
SS	3	Peyton Basler	Junior
LF	6	Jeric Curtis	Junior
CF	7	Kaden Peer	Sophomore
RF	48	Cayden Nicoletto	Senior
DH	10	Gehrig Goldbeck	Junior

Weekend pitching rotation
Day	No.	Player.	Year
Friday	22	Kadden Drew	Junior
Saturday	23	Ian Lohse	Graduate
Sunday	30	Wil Libbert	RS Freshman
Midweek	25	Brock Lucas	Junior

=== Roster ===
2025 Missouri Tigers baseball team
Players
Coaches

#	Pos.	Name	B/T	Height	Weight	Year	Home town
1	UTL	Cameron Benson	L/R	6 ft 3 in (1.91 m)	185 lb (84 kg)	Jr	Farmington Hills, MI
2	UTL	Brock Daniels	L/R	6 ft 1 in (1.85 m)	195 lb (88 kg)	Jr	St. Louis, MO
3	INF	Peyton Basler	S/R	6 ft 0 in (1.83 m)	195 lb (88 kg)	Jr	Lansing, KS
4	C	Jedier Hernandez	R/R	6 ft 0 in (1.83 m)	200 lb (91 kg)	Sr	Trenton, NJ
5	OF	Pierre Seals	R/R	6 ft 0 in (1.83 m)	210 lb (95 kg)	Sr	Memphis, TN
7	UTL	Kaden Peer	L/R	6 ft 2 in (1.88 m)	185 lb (84 kg)	So	Chesterfield, MO
10	INF	Gehrig Goldbeck	L/R	6 ft 1 in (1.85 m)	175 lb (79 kg)	Jr	Kansas City, KS
11	RHP	Austin Henry	R/R	6 ft 5 in (1.96 m)	220 lb (100 kg)	So	Dell Rapids, SD
12	INF	Tyler Macon	R/R	5 ft 11 in (1.8 m)	175 lb (79 kg)	RS Fr	Kirkwood, MO
13	OF	Brady Picarelli	L/R	6 ft 2 in (1.88 m)	200 lb (91 kg)	Fr	Eureka, MO
14	OF	Isaiah Frost	L/L	5 ft 11 in (1.8 m)	197 lb (89 kg)	Sr	Lee's Summit, MO
17	INF	Chris Patterson	R/R	6 ft 3 in (1.91 m)	190 lb (86 kg)	Fr	Frisco, TX
18	INF	Jackson Lovich	R/R	6 ft 4 in (1.93 m)	192 lb (87 kg)	Jr	Overland Park, KS
19	INF	Keegan Knutson	R/R	5 ft 10 in (1.78 m)	195 lb (88 kg)	Jr	Janesville, WI
20	UTL	Trey Lawrence	R/R	6 ft 3 in (1.91 m)	180 lb (82 kg)	Fr	Palmetto, FL
21	RHP	Sam Horn	R/R	6 ft 4 in (1.93 m)	217 lb (98 kg)	So	Lawrenceville, GA
22	LHP	Kadden Drew	R/L	6 ft 2 in (1.88 m)	210 lb (95 kg)	Jr	Scottsdale, AZ
23	P	Ian Lohse	L/L	6 ft 0 in (1.83 m)	199 lb (90 kg)	Gr	St. Louis, MO
24	UTL	Trey Callaway	S/R	6 ft 1 in (1.85 m)	215 lb (98 kg)	Fr	Atlanta, GA
25	RHP	Brock Lucas	R/R	6 ft 3 in (1.91 m)	229 lb (104 kg)	Jr	St. Elizabeth, MO
26	RHP	Victor Christal	R/R	6 ft 0 in (1.83 m)	190 lb (86 kg)	Fr	Raytown, MO
27	UTL	PJ Green	R/R	6 ft 2 in (1.88 m)	195 lb (88 kg)	Fr	Tyrone, GA
28	RHP	Josh Kirchhoff	L/R	6 ft 3 in (1.91 m)	210 lb (95 kg)	Jr	Little Canada, MN
29	RHP	James Vaughn	R/R	6 ft 5 in (1.96 m)	240 lb (109 kg)	Gr	New York, NY
30	LHP	Wil Libbert	L/L	6 ft 1 in (1.85 m)	205 lb (93 kg)	RS Fr	St. Thomas, MO
32	RHP	Kaden Jacobi	R/R	6 ft 3 in (1.91 m)	220 lb (100 kg)	Sr	O'Fallon, MO
35	LHP	Daniel Wissler	L/L	6 ft 2 in (1.88 m)	185 lb (84 kg)	Jr	O'Fallon, MO
36	RHP	Aeneas Clark	R/R	6 ft 3 in (1.91 m)	205 lb (93 kg)	Jr	Peoria, AZ
37	OF	Aden Malpass	L/L	6 ft 0 in (1.83 m)	175 lb (79 kg)	Fr	Hoover, AL
38	INF	Blake Simpson	L/R	6 ft 2 in (1.88 m)	185 lb (84 kg)	Jr	Toronto, ON
39	RHP	Charlie Miller	R/R	6 ft 3 in (1.91 m)	185 lb (84 kg)	So	Lohman, MO
40	LHP	Brady Kehlenbrink	L/L	6 ft 2 in (1.88 m)	205 lb (93 kg)	Fr	Ballwin, MO
41	LHP	Nic Smith	L/L	6 ft 3 in (1.91 m)	198 lb (90 kg)	Jr	Jamestown, TN
43	LHP	Javyn Pimental	L/L	6 ft 3 in (1.91 m)	213 lb (97 kg)	Sr	Kaneohe, HI
44	RHP	Xavier Lovett	R/R	6 ft 0 in (1.83 m)	190 lb (86 kg)	Gr	Houston, TX
48	OF	Cayden Nicoletto	L/L	6 ft 0 in (1.83 m)	190 lb (86 kg)	Sr	Perth, AUS
49	LHP	Tony Neubeck	L/L	6 ft 2 in (1.88 m)	237 lb (108 kg)	Jr	Hugo, MN
50	RHP	Ben Smith	R/R	6 ft 2 in (1.88 m)	195 lb (88 kg)	So	Springfield, MO
51	RHP	Jaylen Merchant	R/R	6 ft 0 in (1.83 m)	180 lb (82 kg)	So	Grayson, GA
54	RHP	Josh McDevitt	R/R	6 ft 2 in (1.88 m)	195 lb (88 kg)	So	Effingham, IL
58	RHP	Seth McCartney	R/R	6 ft 0 in (1.83 m)	200 lb (91 kg)	Jr	Brandon, MS
88	C	Mateo Serna	S/R	6 ft 0 in (1.83 m)	195 lb (88 kg)	So	Doral, FL

Head coach

Kerrick Jackson

Assistant coach(es)

Tim Jamieson
Bryson LeBlanc
Jabari Brown

Legend

- (C) Team captain
- (S) Suspended
- (I) Ineligible
- Injured
- Current redshirt

Roster
Last update: August 25, 2025

=== Coaching and support staff ===
2025 Missouri Tigers baseball coaching and support staff
Name	Position	Seasons at Mizzou	Alma mater
Kerrick Jackson	Head coach	2	University of Nebraska–Lincoln (1997)
Jabari Brown	Assistant coach	2	Claflin University (2016)
Bryson LeBlanc	Hitting coach	2	University of Missouri (2006)
Tim Jamieson	Pitching coach	23	University of New Orleans (1981)
Jose Carballo	Director of Recruiting and Operations	2	Bethune–Cookman University (2018)
Joseph Dattoli	Director of Player Development	2	Southern University (2020)
Anthony Hansen	Director of Player Personnel	2	William Jewell College (2022)
Isaiah Paige	Director of Pitching Development	2	University of Michigan (2021)
Hampton Hudson	Graduate Assistant	1	Southern University (2020)

== Game log ==
2025 Missouri Tigers baseball game log (16–39)
Regular season (16–38)

February (4–5)
Date	Opponent	Rank	Site/stadium	Score	Win	Loss	Save	TV	Attendance	Overall record	SEC record
Puerto Rico Challenge
February 14	vs. Penn State*		Estadio Yldefonso Solá Morales; Caguas, PR	**L** 0–10	Horwat (1–0)	**Lohse** (0–1)	None		550	0–1	—
February 15	vs. UConn*		Estadio Yldefonso Solá Morales	**W** 11–7	**Jacobi** (1–0)	Cooke (0–1)	None		431	1–1	—
February 16	vs. Stetson*		Estadio Yldefonso Solá Morales	**L** 7–9	Pedersen (1–0)	**Kehlenbrink** (0–1)	Miller (1)		558	1–2	—
February 20	at UCF*		John Euliano Park; Orlando, FL	**L** 1–7	Sauser (1–0)	**Libbert** (0–1)	None	B12N+	1,622	1–3	—
Andre Dawson Classic
February 21	vs. Florida A&M*		Holman Stadium; Vero Beach, FL	**W** 6–5	**Jacobi** (2–0)	Williams (0–1)	**Lovett** (1)		240	2–3	—
February 22	vs. Alabama State*		Holman Stadium	**L** 2–10	Martinez (2–0)	**Lohse** (0–2)	Smith (1)		268	2–4	—
February 23	vs. Southern*		Holman Stadium	**W** 15–3^{8}	**Drew** (1–0)	Luckett (1–1)	None		246	3–4	—
February 25	Lindenwood*		Taylor Stadium; Columbia, MO	**W** 14–10	**Vaughn** (1–0)	Paschke (0–2)	None	SECN+	1,116	4–4	—
February 28	Evansville*		Taylor Stadium	**L** 6–7	Deverman (1–1)	**Vaughn** (1–1)	Roberts (1)	SECN+	1,273	4–5	—

March (5–12)
Date	Opponent	Rank	Site/stadium	Score	Win	Loss	Save	TV	Attendance	Overall record	SEC record
March 1	Evansville*		Taylor Stadium	**W** 6–2	**Libbert** (1–1)	Byberg (0–1)	Green (1)	SECN+	1,254	5–5	—
March 1	Evansville*		Taylor Stadium	**W** 17–7	**Drew** (2–0)	James (0–2)	None	SECN+	1,254	6–5	—
March 2	Evansville*		Taylor Stadium	**L** 5–9	Reed (2–1)	**Lucas** (0–1)	Roberts (2)	SECN+	1,123	6–6	—
March 4	Southeast Missouri*		Taylor Stadium	**Postponed**							
March 7	Binghamton*		Taylor Stadium	**L** 7–8^{13}	Griffith (1–0)	**Lovett** (0–1)	None	SECN+	1,348	6–7	—
March 8	Binghamton*		Taylor Stadium	**W** 16–6^{7}	**Kirchhoff** (1–0)	Bouchard (1–2)	None		1,157	7–7	—
March 8	Binghamton*		Taylor Stadium	**W** 4–2	**Lucas** (1–1)	Rothbaum (0–1)	None		1,157	8–7	—
March 9	Binghamton*		Taylor Stadium	**L** 2–5^{7}	Rhein (1–3)	**Jacobi** (2–1)	Dally (1)		1,179	8–8	—
March 14	at No. 1 LSU		Alex Box Stadium; Baton Rouge, LA	**L** 5–12	Anderson (4–0)	**Lohse** (0–3)	None	SECN+	11,741	8–9	0–1
March 15	at No. 1 LSU		Alex Box Stadium	**L** 6–7	Ware (2–0)	**Libbert** (1–2)	Evans (4)	SECN+	11,675	8–10	0–2
March 16	at No. 1 LSU		Alex Box Stadium	**L** 5–10	Ware (3–0)	**Drew** (2–1)	None	SECN+	10,803	8–11	0–3
March 21	No. 18 Ole Miss		Taylor Stadium	**L** 6–9	Morris (3–0)	**Jacobi** (2–2)	None	SECN+	1,178	8–12	0–4
March 22	No. 18 Ole Miss		Taylor Stadium	**L** 10–17	Canney (1–0)	**Lucas** (1–2)	None	SECN+	1,532	8–13	0–5
March 23	No. 18 Ole Miss		Taylor Stadium	**L** 6–14	Nichols (2–0)	**Green** (0–1)	McCausland (1)	SECN+	1,237	8–14	0–6
Arch Series
March 25	vs. Illinois*		Grizzlies Ballpark; Sauget, IL	**W** 11–9	**Libbert** (2–2)	Daly (1–2)	**Lovett** (2)		1,471	9–14	—
March 28	No. 7 Texas		Taylor Stadium	**L** 4–15^{7}	Spencer (3–1)	**Lohse** (0–4)	None	SECN+	1,453	9–15	0–7
March 29 (DH 1)	No. 7 Texas		Taylor Stadium	**L** 4–7	Grubbs (3–0)	**Jacobi** (2–3)	Volantis (6)	SECN+		9–16	0–8
March 29 (DH 2)	No. 7 Texas		Taylor Stadium	**L** 1–7	Riojas (6–1)	**Kehlenbrink** (0–2)	None	SECN	2,092	9–17	0–9

April (4–13)
Date	Opponent	Rank	Site/stadium	Score	Win	Loss	Save	TV	Attendance	Overall record	SEC record
April 1	UAPB*		Taylor Stadium	**W** 25–10^{7}	**Kirchhoff** (2–0)	Bedgood (0–2)	None	SECN+	947	10–17	—
April 2	UAPB*		Taylor Stadium	**W** 8–7	**Lovett** (1–1)	Fabian (1–5)	None	SECN	989	11–17	—
Battle Line Series
April 5	at No. 2 Arkansas		Baum–Walker Stadium; Fayetteville, AR	**L** 3–21^{7}	Root (3–1)	**Jacobi** (2–4)	None	SECN	9,927	11–18	0–10
April 6 (DH 1)	at No. 2 Arkansas		Baum–Walker Stadium	**L** 4–14^{7}	Jimenez (4–0)	**Lucas** (1–3)	None	SECN+	9,614	11–19	0–11
April 6 (DH 2)	at No. 2 Arkansas		Baum–Walker Stadium	**L** 2–16^{7}	Foutch (2–0)	**Neubeck** (0–1)	None	SECN+	9,614	11–20	0–12
April 8	at SIUE*		Roy E. Lee Field; Edwardsville, IL	**W** 11–8	**Drew** (3–1)	Rossy (0–1)	None		136	12–20	—
April 10	at Florida		Condron Family Ballpark; Gainesville, FL	**L** 2–11	Peterson (5–2)	**Kehlenbrink** (0–3)	None	SECN	4,962	12–21	0–13
April 12 (DH 1)	at Florida		Condron Family Ballpark	**L** 0–5^{7}	King (4–1)	**Jacobi** (2–5)	Clemente (2)	SECN+	6,067	12–22	0–14
April 12 (DH 2)	at Florida		Condron Family Ballpark	**L** 2–3^{7}	Philpott (1–3)	**Lovett** (0–4)	None	SECN	6,067	12–23	0–15
April 15	Missouri State*		Taylor Stadium	**W** 10–9	**Green** (1–1)	Holmes (4–4)	None	SECN+	1,250	13–23	—
April 17	No. 18 Oklahoma		Taylor Stadium	**L** 4–17^{8}	Crossland (3–2)	**Brock** (1–4)	None	SECN+	1,431	13–24	0–16
April 18 (DH 1)	No. 18 Oklahoma		Taylor Stadium	**L** 7–17^{8}	K. Witherspoon (7–2)	**Jacobi** (2–6)	None	SECN+		13–25	0–17
April 18 (DH 2)	No. 18 Oklahoma		Taylor Stadium	**L** 1–12^{7}	M. Witherspoon (3–4)	**Neubeck** (0–2)	None	SECN+	1,331	13–26	0–18
April 22	at Missouri State*		Hammons Field; Springfield, MO	**L** 0–11^{7}	Knight (3–2)	**McDevitt** (0–1)	None	ESPN+	3,581	13–27	—
April 24	at No. 18 Alabama		Sewell–Thomas Stadium; Tuscaloosa, AL	**L** 5–7	Ozmer (4–0)	**Green** (1–2)	None	SECN	3,534	13–28	0–19
April 25	at No. 18 Alabama		Sewell–Thomas Stadium	**L** 3–7	Quick (6–2)	**Libbert** (2–3)	Myers (2)	SECN+	3,731	13–29	0–20
April 26	at No. 18 Alabama		Sewell–Thomas Stadium	**L** 1–12^{7}	Adams (6–2)	**Horn** (0–1)	None	SECN+	4,062	13–30	0–21
Border War
April 29	at No. 25 Kansas*		Hoglund Ballpark; Lawrence, KS	**L** 3–9	Vetock (3–0)	**Kirchhoff** (2–1)	None	ESPN+	2,545	13–31	—

May (3–7)
Date	Opponent	Rank	Site/stadium	Score	Win	Loss	Save	TV	Attendance	Overall record	SEC record
May 2	No. 9 Georgia		Taylor Stadium	**L** 2–9	Curley (3–2)	**Kehlenbrink** (0–4)	None	SECN+	1,647	13–32	0–22
May 3	No. 9 Georgia		Taylor Stadium	**L** 2–5	Smith (4–2)	**Neubeck** (0–3)	Harris (1)	SECN	1,794	13–33	0–23
May 4	No. 9 Georgia		Taylor Stadium	**L** 2–4	Davis II (5–0)	**Green** (1–3)	Harris (2)	SECN+	1,631	13–34	0–24
Border War
May 6	Kansas*		Taylor Stadium	**L** 5-6	Lin (3-2)	**Neubeck** (0-4)	Breckheimer (6)	SECN+	1,948	13–35	—
May 9	at Texas A&M		Olsen Field; College Station, TX	**W** 9-6	**Lovett** (2-2)	Wilson (0-2)	None	SECN+	6,521	14-35	1-24
May 10	at Texas A&M		Olsen Field	**W** 4-1	**Neubeck** (1-4)	Lamkin (3-7)	**Lucas** (1)	SECN+	6,753	15-35	2-24
May 11	at Texas A&M		Olsen Field	**W** 10-1	**Libbert** (3-3)	Patton (3-4)	**McDevitt** (1)	SECN+	5,623	16-35	3-24
May 15	Mississippi State		Taylor Stadium	**L** 7-25	Simmons (4-2)	**Kehlenbrink** (0-5)	Williams (1)	SECN+	1,455	16-36	3-25
May 16	Mississippi State		Taylor Stadium	**L** 3-13	Davis (3-2)	**Neubeck** (1-5)	None	SECN+	1,436	16-37	3-26
May 17	Mississippi State		Taylor Stadium	**L** 1-12	Ligon (6-5)	**McDevitt** (0-2)	None	SECN+	1,668	16-38	3-27

Postseason (0–1)

SEC Tournament (0–1)
Date	Opponent(Seed)	Rank(Seed)	Site/stadium	Score	Win	Loss	Save	TV	Attendance	Overall record	SECT record
May 20	No. 23 Alabama (9)	(16)	Hoover Metropolitan Stadium; Hoover, AL	**L** 1-4	Fay (1-2)	**Libbert** (3-4)	Ozmer (17)	SECN	6,525	16-39	0–1

Legend: = Win = Loss = Canceled
Bold = Missouri team member
Rankings are based on the team's current ranking in the D1Baseball poll.

== Record vs. conference opponents ==
Blank are not scheduled. Blue are home games, otherwise away.

2025 SEC baseball records Source: 2025 SEC baseball game results, 2025 SEC baseball schedule
Tm	W–L	ALA	ARK	AUB	FLA	UGA	KEN	LSU	MSU	MIZ	OKL	OMS	SCA	TEN	TEX	TAM	VAN	Tm	SR	SW
ALA	16–14		.	1–2	1–2	2–1	.	1–2	1–2	3–0	2–1	.	.	1–2	.	3–0	1–2	ALA	4–6	2–0
ARK	20–10	.		.	1–2	1–2	.	1–2	.	3–0	.	2–1	3–0	2–1	3–0	1–2	3–0	ARK	6–4	4–0
AUB	17–13	2–1	.		.	0–3	2–1	3–0	2–1	.	.	1–2	3–0	2–1	0–3	.	2–1	AUB	7–3	2–2
FLA	15–15	2–1	2–1	.		0–3	.	.	2–1	3–0	.	1–2	3–0	0–3	2–1	.	0–3	FLA	6–4	2–3
UGA	18–12	1–2	2–1	3–0	3–0		2–1	.	.	3–0	2–1	.	.	.	0–3	2–1	0–3	UGA	7–3	3–2
KEN	13–17	.	.	1–2	.	1–2		.	0–3	.	3–0	1–2	2–1	2–1	1–2	2–1	0–3	KEN	4–6	1–2
LSU	19–11	2–1	2–1	0–3	.	.	.		3–0	3–0	3–0	.	2–1	2–1	1–2	1–2	.	LSU	7–3	3–1
MSU	15–15	2–1	.	1–2	1–2	.	3–0	0–3		3–0	1–2	2–1	2–1	.	0–3	.	.	MSU	5–5	2–2
MIZ	3–27	0–3	0–3	.	0–3	0–3	.	0–3	0–3		0–3	0–3	.	.	0–3	3–0	.	MIZ	1–9	1–9
OKL	14–16	1–2	.	.	.	1–2	0–3	0–3	2–1	3–0		2–1	2–1	.	1–2	.	2–1	OKL	5–5	1–2
OMS	16–14	.	1–2	2–1	2–1	.	2–1	.	1–2	3–0	1–2		1–2	1–2	.	.	2–1	OMS	5–5	1–0
SCA	6–24	.	0–3	0–3	0–3	.	1–2	1–2	1–2	.	1–2	2–1		0–3	.	0–3	.	SCA	1–9	0–5
TEN	16–14	2–1	1–2	1–2	3–0	.	1–2	1–2	.	.	.	2–1	3–0		.	1–2	1–2	TEN	4–6	2–0
TEX	22–8	.	0–3	3–0	1–2	3–0	2–1	2–1	3–0	3–0	2–1	.	.	.		3–0	.	TEX	8–2	5–1
TAM	11–19	0–3	2–1	.	.	1–2	1–2	2–1	.	0–3	.	.	3–0	2–1	0–3		0–3	TAM	4–6	1–4
VAN	19–11	2–1	0–3	1–2	3–0	3–0	3–0	.	.	.	1–2	1–2	.	2–1	.	3–0		VAN	6–4	4–1
Tm	W–L	ALA	ARK	AUB	FLA	UGA	KEN	LSU	MSU	MIZ	OKL	OMS	SCA	TEN	TEX	TAM	VAN	Team	SR	SW

Updated for entire regular season.
Tie brkrs: LSU>VAN ARK common, OMS>TEN & OMS>ALA VAN common, TEN>ALA hd to hd, FLA>MSU hd to hd.

== Rankings ==
Ranking movements Legend: — = Not ranked
	Week																		
Poll	Pre	1	2	3	4	5	6	7	8	9	10	11	12	13	14	15	16	17	Final
Coaches'	—	—*	—	—	—	—	—	—	—	—	—	—	—	—	—	—			
Baseball America	—	—	—	—	—	—	—	—	—	—	—	—	—	—	—	—			
NCBWA†	—	—	—	—	—	—	—	—	—	—	—	—	—	—	—	—			
D1Baseball	—	—	—	—	—	—	—	—	—	—	—	—	—	—	—	—			
Perfect Game	—	—	—	—	—	—	—	—	—	—	—	—	—	—	—	—			

† NCBWA ranks 30 teams in their preseason poll, but only ranks 25 teams weekly during the season.
* A new poll was not released for this week, so for comparison purposes, the previous week's ranking is inserted in this week's slot.
