= 2025 Texas Longhorns baseball team =

College Baseball Season

2025 Texas Longhorns baseball

SEC Regular season champions

Austin Regional, 2–2
- Conference: Southeastern Conference

Ranking
- Coaches: No. 12
- D1Baseball.com: No. 17
- Record: 44–14 (22–8 SEC)
- Head coach: Jim Schlossnagle (1st season)
- Associate head coach: Nolan Cain (1st season)
- Assistant coaches: Troy Tulowitzki (4th season); Max Weiner (1st season); Michael Cantu (1st season)
- Home stadium: UFCU Disch–Falk Field

2025 Southeastern Conference baseball standings
	Conf.				Overall
Team	W		L	PCT	W		L	PCT
No. 17 Texas ‍†‍‍^{y}	22	–	8	.733	44	–	14	.759
No. 3 Arkansas ‍‍‍^{y}	20	–	10	.667	50	–	15	.769
No. 1 LSU ‍‍‍^{y}	19	–	11	.633	53	–	15	.779
No. 18 Vanderbilt ‍‍‡‍^{y}	19	–	11	.633	43	–	18	.705
No. 19 Georgia ‍‍‍^{y}	18	–	12	.600	43	–	17	.717
No. 11 Auburn ‍‍‍^{y}	17	–	13	.567	41	–	20	.672
No. 21 Ole Miss ‍‍‍^{y}	16	–	14	.533	43	–	21	.672
No. 12 Tennessee ‍‍‍^{y}	16	–	14	.533	46	–	19	.708
Alabama ‍‍‍^{y}	16	–	14	.533	41	–	18	.695
Florida ‍‍‍^{y}	15	–	15	.500	39	–	22	.639
Mississippi State ‍‍‍^{y}	15	–	15	.500	36	–	23	.610
Oklahoma ‍‍‍^{y}	14	–	16	.467	38	–	22	.633
Kentucky ‍‍‍^{y}	13	–	17	.433	31	–	26	.544
Texas A&M ‍‍‍	11	–	19	.367	30	–	26	.536
South Carolina ‍‍‍	6	–	24	.200	28	–	29	.491
Missouri ‍‍‍	3	–	27	.100	16	–	39	.291
† – Conference champion ‡ – Tournament champion y – Invited to the NCAA Tournament; As of June 22, 2025; Rankings from D1Baseball

The 2025 Texas Longhorns baseball team represented the University of Texas at Austin during the 2025 NCAA Division I baseball season. The Longhorns played their home games at UFCU Disch–Falk Field as a member of the Southeastern Conference. They were led by first year head coach Jim Schlossnagle.

== Previous season ==
Texas finished the 2024 season 36–24, 20–10 in Big 12 play.

== Personnel ==
=== Roster ===
2025 Texas Longhorns roster
Pitchers: 4 – Jason Flores (Note: Plays two different positions) – Freshman (6'2, 245); 7 – Bryce Navarre – Freshman (6'1, 210); 11 – Kade Bing – Sophomore (6'1, 185); 12 – Jared Spencer – Senior (6'3, 210); 13 – Ruger Riojas – Junior (6'1, 192); 15 – Drew Rerick – Freshman (6'5, 250); 17 – Easton Tumis – Sophomore (6'4, 165); 27 – Grayson Saunier – Junior (6'4, 222); 28 – Ace Whitehead – Senior (5'11, 208); 32 – Aiden Moffett – Junior (6'3, 230); 33 – Connor McCreery – Junior (6'6, 238); 34 – Will Mercer – (redshirt) Senior (6'1, 230); 38 – Max Grubbs – Junior (6'1, 218); 41 – Cody Howard – (redshirt) Junior (6'1, 215); 45 – Thomas Burns – Sophomore (6'3, 230); 46 – Ethan Walker – (redshirt) Sophomore (6'0, 207); 47 – George Zaharias – (redshirt) Freshman (6'3, 220); 48 – Hudson Hamilton – Sophomore (6'1, 225); 49 – Oliver Santos – (redshirt) Freshman (6'4, 208); 53 – Luke Harrison – (redshirt) Junior (6'2, 215); 55 – Jonah Williams – Freshman (6’3, 200); 57 – Chance Covert II – Freshman (6'2, 213); 88 – Andre Duplantier II – (redshirt) Senior (6'2, 235); 99 – Dylan Volantis – Freshman (6'6, 212)	Catchers: 6 – Rylan Galvan – Junior (6'0, 215); 10 – Kimble Schuessler – (redshirt) Senior (6'2, 215); 42 – Oliver Service – Sophomore (6'0, 208); 52 – Cole Chamberlain – Freshman (6'2, 215); Infielders: 0 – Jayden Duplantier – Junior (6’1, 195); 1 – Jalin Flores – Junior (6’2, 210); 4 – Jason Flores – Freshman (6'2, 245); 5 – Ethan Mendoza – Sophomore (5'10, 185); 14 – Cade O’Hara – Junior (5'11, 192); 24 – Adrian Rodriguez – Freshman (6'2, 210); 31 – Casey Borba – Sophomore (6'1, 210); 35 – Jaquae Stewart – Sophomore (5'10, 227); 36 – Carson Luna – Freshman (6'1, 187); 50 – Samuel Richardson – Freshman (6'1, 215)	Outfielders: 8 – Will Gasparino – Sophomore (6'6, 225); 9 – Easton Winfield – Sophomore (6'0, 215); 19 – Donovan Jordan – Freshman (6'1, 230); 28 – Ace Whitehead – Senior (5'11, 208); 29 – Blake Peterson – Sophomore (6'1, 210); 37 – Matthew Scott II – Freshman (6'4, 210); 42 – Oliver Service – Sophomore (6'0, 208); 43 – Tommy Farmer IV – Sophomore (6'3, 208); 44 – Max Belyeu – Junior (6’2, 215); 55 – Jonah Williams – Freshman (6’3, 200); Legend: (S) Suspended; (I) Ineligible; Injured; Redshirt

Roster Notes

=== Starters ===
Lineup
Pos.	No.	Player.	Year
C	6	Rylan Galvan	Junior
1B	10	Kimble Schuessler	Senior
2B	5	Ethan Mendoza	Sophomore
3B	31	Casey Borba	Sophomore
SS	1	Jalin Flores	Junior
LF	43	Tommy Farmer IV	Sophomore
CF	8	Will Gasparino	Sophomore
RF	44	Max Belyeu	Junior
DH	24	Adrian Rodriguez	Freshman

=== Coaches ===
2025 Texas Longhorns coaching staff
- Jim Schlossnagle – Head coach – 1st year
- Nolan Cain – Associate Head coach/Recruiting Coordinator – 1st year
- Troy Tulowitzki – Assistant coach/Hitting – 4th year
- Max Weiner – Assistant coach/Pitching – 1st year
- Michael Cantu – Student assistant – 1st year

=== Support staff ===
2025 Texas Longhorns support staff
- Drew Bishop – Director of operations – 1st year
- Chuck Box – Director of program development – 1st year
- Gehrig Mosiello – Director of player development – 1st year
- Matt Couch – Assistant head coach for athletic performance – 6th year
- Tom Mendez – Assistant athletic trainer – 6th year

== Offseason ==
=== Departures ===
Offseason departures
Name	Number	Pos.	Height	Weight	Year	Hometown	Notes
Brandon Bertsch	54	P	6'0"	170	Redshirt Freshman	Dallas, TX	Departed Team
Cam Constantine	29	P	6'0"	210	Redshirt Junior	McKinney, TX	Departed Team
Casey Cummings	55	OF	6'0"	190	Senior	Danville, CA	Departed Team
Chase Lummus	24	P	6'1"	205	Redshirt Junior	Godley, TX	Graduated
Heston Tole	45	P	6'6"	230	Senior	Wichita Falls, TX	Graduated
Jack O'Dowd	27	IF	6'2"	210	Senior	Nashville, TN	Graduated
Nik Sanders	37	C	6'2"	215	Freshman	Waco, TX	Departed Team
Peyton Powell	15	UTL	6'1"	190	Redshirt Senior	Robinson, TX	Graduated
Porter Brown	4	OF	6'0"	205	Redshirt Senior	San Antonio, TX	Graduated
Seth Werchan	51	OF	6'3"	205	Senior	Austin, TX	Departed Team

==== Outgoing transfers ====
Outgoing transfers
Name	No.	Pos.	Height	Weight	Hometown	Year	New school	Source
Cole Selvig	46	P	6'0”	205 lbs	Altoona, WI	Freshman	Minnesota	
David Shaw	36	P	6'7”	200 lbs	Houston, TX	Junior	California	
Dee Kennedy	30	IF	5'11”	185 lbs	Fort Worth, TX	Freshman	Kansas State	
Sam Ardoin	19	IF	6’1”	170 lbs	Moss Bluff, LA	Freshman	Louisiana	

==== 2024 MLB draft ====
Round	Pick	Overall pick	Player	Position	MLB team	Source
2	3	42	Jared Thomas	1B/OF	Colorado Rockies	
5	3	139	Lebarron Johnson Jr.	P	Colorado Rockies	
14	8	413	Tanner Witt	P	New York Mets	

==== Undrafted free agents ====
Player	Position	MLB team	Source
Charlie Hurley	P	Chicago Cubs	
Gage Boehm	P	Seattle Mariners	
Peyton Powell	UTL	Toronto Blue Jays	

==== Coaching staff departures ====
Name	Position	New Team	New Position	Source
David Pierce	Head Coach	Texas State	Assistant Coach	
Steve Rodriguez	Assistant Coach	N/A	N/A	
Caleb Longley	Assistant Coach	Texas A&M	Assistant Coach	
Chris Gordon	Coordinator, Hitting and Pitching Development	South Carolina	Director of Player Development	
Carli Todd	Director of Operations	N/A	N/A	

Coaching Staff Notes

=== Acquisitions ===
==== Incoming transfers ====
Incoming transfers
Name	B/T	Pos.	Height	Weight	Hometown	Year	Previous school	Source
Aiden Moffett	R/R	P	6'3"	221	Mount Olive, MS	Junior	LSU	
Connor McCreery	R/R	P	6'6"	225	Williston Park, NY	Junior	South Carolina	
Easton Winfield	L/R	OF	6'0"	205	Alvin, TX	Sophomore	Louisiana–Monroe	
Ethan Mendoza	R/R	IF	5'10"	175	Bedford, TX	Sophomore	Arizona State	
Ethan Walker	L/L	P	6'0"	185	Ashburn, VA	Sophomore	Walters State	
Grayson Saunier	L/R	P	6'4"	210	Memphis, TN	Junior	Ole Miss	
Jaquae Stewart	L/L	IF	5'10"	245	Sinton, TX	Sophomore	Northwest Florida State	
Jared Spencer	L/L	P	6'3"	195	Centreville, MI	Senior	Indiana State	
Kade Bing	L/L	P	6'1"	180	West, TX	Sophomore	McLennan	
Ruger Riojas	R/R	P	6'1"	180	Wimberley, TX	Junior	UTSA	
Thomas Burns	R/R	P	6'3"	210	Hortonville, WI	Sophomore	Arizona State	

==== Incoming recruits ====
2024 Texas Recruits
Name	B/T	Pos.	Height	Weight	Hometown	High School	Source
Samuel Richardson	R/R	3B/OF	6'1"	195	Olive Branch, MS	Lewisburg High School	
Jason Flores	R/R	P/IF/OF	6'2"	210	Wylie, TX	Naaman Forest High School	
Carson Luna	R/R	IF	6'1"	180	Houston, TX	St. John's School	
Matt Scott II	R/R	OF/P	6'4"	210	Spring, TX	Klein Oak High School	
Cole Chamberlain	L/R	C/IF	6'2"	215	Novato, CA	San Marin High School	
Donovan Jordan	R/R	UTL	6'1"	210	Humble, TX	Summer Creek High School	
Chance Covert II	L/L	P/OF	6'2"	196	Austin, TX	Westlake High School	
Bryce Navarre	L/L	P	6'1"	190	Montgomery, TX	Montgomery High School	
Adrian Rodriguez	S/R	IF/OF	6'2"	185	Flower Mound, TX	Flower Mound High School	
Drew Rerick	R/R	P	6'5"	230	Fargo, ND	Davies High School	
Dylan Volantis	L/L	P	6'6"	200	Thousand Oaks, CA	Westlake High School	

=== Coaching staff additions ===
Name	Position	Previous Team	Previous Position	Source
Jim Schlossnagle	Head Coach	Texas A&M	Head Coach	
Nolan Cain	Associate Head Coach/Recruiting Coordinator	Texas A&M	Associate Head Coach/Recruiting Coordinator	
Max Weiner	Assistant Coach/Pitching	Texas A&M	Assistant Coach	
Chuck Box	Director of Program Development	Texas A&M	Director of Player and Program Development	
Gehrig Mosiello	Director of Player Development	Johnson	Assistant Coach	

== Preseason ==
After the conclusion of the 2024 season, Texas fired head coach David Pierce. Just one day later on June 25th, the Longhorns hired Texas A&M head coach Jim Schlossnagle. Schlossnagle proceeded to bring two members of Texas A&M's coaching staff along with him including Nolan Cain and Max Weiner.

=== SEC coaches poll ===
SEC coaches poll
Predicted finish	Team	Votes (1st place)
1	Texas A&M	228 (10)
2	Tennessee	215 (1)
3	Arkansas	214 (3)
4	LSU	204 (1)
5	Florida	183 (1)
6	Georgia	165
7	Vanderbilt	156
8	Texas	146
9	Mississippi State	112
10	Kentucky	102
11	Oklahoma	101
12	Auburn	100
13	Alabama	98
14	South Carolina	61
15	Ole Miss	60
16	Missouri	31

=== Awards and honors ===
==== Preseason SEC awards and honors ====
Preseason All-SEC Team
Player	No.	Position	Class	Designation
Max Belyeu	44	OF	Junior	First Team
Rylan Galvan	6	C	Junior	Second Team

==== Preseason All-Americans ====
Preseason All-Americans
Player	Position	Selector	Ref.
Max Belyeu	OF	D1Baseball; NCBWA	
Jalin Flores	IF	D1Baseball; NCBWA	
Ruger Riojas	P	NCBWA	

== Schedule and results ==
2025 Texas Longhorns baseball game log (44–14)
Legend: = Win = Loss = Canceled Bold = Texas team member
Regular season (42–11)

February (7–1)
Date	Time (CT)	TV	Opponent	Rank	Stadium	Score	Win	Loss	Save	Attendance	Overall record	SEC Record	Box Score	Recap
Shriners Children's College Showdown
February 14	7:00 p.m.	FloSports	Louisville	#19	Globe Life Field • Arlington, TX	**L** 3–4 ^{(10)}	Biven (1–0)	**Mercer** (0–1)	None	8,344	0–1	–	Box Score	Recap
February 15	7:00 p.m.	FloSports	Ole Miss	#19	Globe Life Field • Arlington, TX	**W** 10–0 ^{(7)}	**Harrison** (1–0)	Maddox (0–1)	None	13,289	1–1	–	Box Score	Recap
February 16	6:30 p.m.	FloSports	#17 Oklahoma State	#19	Globe Life Field • Arlington, TX	**W** 14–8	**Rerick** (1–0)	Wech (0–2)	None	10,138	2–1	–	Box Score	Recap
February 18	6:30 p.m.	SECN+	Houston	#16	UFCU Disch–Falk Field • Austin, TX	Cancelled due to inclement weather.								
February 21	1:00 p.m.	SECN+	Dartmouth	#16	UFCU Disch–Falk Field • Austin, TX	**W** 4–3	**Riojas** (1–0)	Dumsky (0–1)	**Burns** (1)	6,307	3–1	–	Box Score	Recap
February 22	1:00 p.m.	SECN+	Dartmouth	#16	UFCU Disch–Falk Field • Austin, TX	**W** 3–2	**Duplantier II** (1–0)	Loeger (0–1)	**Grubbs** (1)	6,433	4–1	–	Box Score	Recap
February 23	12:00 p.m.	SECN+	Dartmouth	#16	UFCU Disch–Falk Field • Austin, TX	**W** 4–1	**Volantis** (1–0)	Isler (0–1)	None	6,910	5–1	–	Box Score	Recap
February 25	6:30 p.m.	SECN+	Incarnate Word	#15	UFCU Disch–Falk Field • Austin, TX	**W** 6–0	**Flores** (1–0)	Garcia (2–1)	None	6,964	6–1	–	Box Score	Recap
Las Vegas Classic
February 28	8:00 p.m.	D1Baseball	Washington	#15	Las Vegas Ballpark • Summerlin South, NV	**W** 10–9	**Spencer** (1–0)	Banks (1–2)	**Grubbs** (2)	4,777	7–1	–	Box Score	Recap

March (16–2)
Date	Time (CT)	TV	Opponent	Rank	Stadium	Score	Win	Loss	Save	Attendance	Overall record	SEC Record	Box Score	Recap
March 1	6:00 p.m.	D1Baseball	Texas Tech	#15	Las Vegas Ballpark • Summerlin South, NV	**W** 10–5	**Harrison** (2–0)	Pirko (0–1)	**Volantis** (1)	6,021	8–1	–	Box Score	Recap
March 2	1:00 p.m.	D1Baseball	Illinois	#15	Las Vegas Ballpark • Summerlin South, NV	**W** 15–6	**Grubbs** (1–0)	Weber (0–2)	None	N/A	9–1	–	Box Score	Recap
March 4	6:30 p.m.	SECN+	Texas A&M–Corpus Christi	#12	UFCU Disch–Falk Field • Austin, TX	**W** 15–5^{(8)}	**Riojas** (2–0)	LaRusso (1–1)	None	6,938	10–1	–	Box Score	Recap
March 7	6:30 p.m.	SECN+	Santa Clara	#12	UFCU Disch–Falk Field • Austin, TX	**W** 4–2	**Spencer** (2–0)	Gomez (1–2)	**Grubbs** (3)	7,292	11–1	–	Box Score	Recap
March 8	2:00 p.m.	SECN+	Santa Clara	#12	UFCU Disch–Falk Field • Austin, TX	**W** 8–3	**Riojas** (3–0)	Martinez (1–2)	None	7,323	12–1	–	Box Score	Recap
March 9	1:00 p.m.	SECN+	Santa Clara	#12	UFCU Disch–Falk Field • Austin, TX	**W** 6–1	**Volantis** (2–0)	Bayles (1–1)	None	7,197	13–1	–	Box Score	Recap
March 11	6:30 p.m.	SECN+	UT Arlington	#11	UFCU Disch–Falk Field • Austin, TX	**W** 7–4	**Navarre** (1–0)	Zahradnik (0–1)	**Burns** (2)	7,294	14–1	–	Box Score	Recap
March 14	6:00 p.m.	SECN+	at Mississippi State*	#11	Dudy Noble Field • Starkville, MS	**W** 8–7	**Duplantier** (2–0)	Hungate (1–1)	**Volantis** (2)	11,238	15–1	1–0	Box Score	Recap
March 16 (DH 1)	1:00 p.m.	SECN	at Mississippi State*	#11	Dudy Noble Field • Starkville, MS	**W** 5–3^{(7)}	**Riojas** (4–0)	Williams (0–1)	**Volantis** (3)	N/A	16–1	2–0	Box Score	Recap
March 16 (DH 2)	5:40 p.m.	SECN+	at Mississippi State*	#11	Dudy Noble Field • Starkville, MS	**W** 4–1^{(7)}	**Flores** (2–0)	Ligon (2–2)	**Grubbs** (4)	11,961	17–1	3–0	Box Score	Recap
March 18	6:30 p.m.	SECN+	UTSA	#8	UFCU Disch–Falk Field • Austin, TX	**L** 7–8^{(12)}	Owens (3–1)	**Riojas** (5–1)	None	7,378	17–2	–	Box Score	Recap
March 21	7:00 p.m.	SECN	#2 LSU*	#8	UFCU Disch–Falk Field • Austin, TX	**L** 2–8	Anderson (5–0)	**Spencer** (2–1)	Cowan (2)	6,838	17–3	3–1	Box Score	Recap
March 22	6:00 p.m.	SECN+	#2 LSU*	#8	UFCU Disch–Falk Field • Austin, TX	**W** 11–7	**Grubbs** (2–0)	Benge (0–1)	**Volantis** (4)	7,100	18–3	4–1	Box Score	Recap
March 23	2:00 p.m.	SECN+	#2 LSU*	#8	UFCU Disch–Falk Field • Austin, TX	**W** 6–2	**Riojas** (5–1)	Shores (4–1)	**Volantis** (5)	7,211	19–3	5–1	Box Score	Recap
March 25	6:30 p.m.	SECN+	Sam Houston	#7	UFCU Disch–Falk Field • Austin, TX	**W** 13–3^{(7)}	**Bing** (1–0)	Valadez (2–2)	None	6,671	20–3	–	Box Score	Recap
March 28	6:00 p.m.	SECN+	at Missouri*	#7	Taylor Stadium • Columbia, MO	**W** 15–4^{(7)}	**Spencer** (3–1)	Lohse (0–4)	None	1,453	21–3	6–1	Box Score	Recap
March 29 (DH 1)	2:00 p.m.	SECN+	at Missouri*	#7	Taylor Stadium • Columbia, MO	**W** 7–4	**Grubbs** (3–0)	Jacobi (2–3)	**Volantis** (6)	2,092	22–3	7–1	Box Score	Recap
March 29 (DH 2)	1:00 p.m.	SECN	at Missouri*	#7	Taylor Stadium • Columbia, MO	**W** 7–1	**Riojas** (6–1)	Kehlenbrink (0–2)	None	2,092	23–3	8–1	Box Score	Recap

April (15–2)
Date	Time (CT)	TV	Opponent	Rank	Stadium	Score	Win	Loss	Save	Attendance	Overall record	SEC Record	Box Score	Recap
April 1	6:30 p.m.	SECN+	Texas State	#5	UFCU Disch–Falk Field • Austin, TX	**L** 3–5	Laws (1–0)	**Flores** (2–1)	Valentin (1)	7,047	23–4	–	Box Score	Recap
April 4	6:30 p.m.	SECN+	#3 Georgia*	#5	UFCU Disch–Falk Field • Austin, TX	**W** 5–1	**Spencer** (4–1)	Goldstein (0–1)	**Volantis** (7)	7,246	24–4	9–1	Box Score	Recap
April 5	2:00 p.m.	SECN+	#3 Georgia*	#5	UFCU Disch–Falk Field • Austin, TX	**W** 7–4	**Grubbs** (3–0)	Smith (2–1)	None	7,192	25–4	10–1	Box Score	Recap
April 6	1:00 p.m.	SECN+	#3 Georgia*	#5	UFCU Disch–Falk Field • Austin, TX	**W** 4–3^{(10)}	**Volantis** (3–0)	Zeldin (1–1)	None	6,974	26–4	11–1	Box Score	Recap
April 8	6:30 p.m.	SECN+	Houston Christian	#2	UFCU Disch–Falk Field • Austin, TX	**W** 12–2^{(7)}	**Flores** (3–1)	Hamilton (0–1)	None	6,526	27–4	–	Box Score	Recap
April 11	5:30 p.m.	SECN+	at Kentucky*	#2	Kentucky Proud Park • Lexington, KY	**W** 6–3	**Grubbs** (5–0)	Rouse (3–1)	**Volantis** (8)	3,134	28–4	12–1	Box Score	Recap
April 12	11:00 a.m.	SECN	at Kentucky*	#2	Kentucky Proud Park • Lexington, KY	**L** 4–5^{(15)}	Hentschel (1–2)	**Burns** (0–1)	None	3,586	28–5	12–2	Box Score	Recap
April 13	11:00 a.m.	SECN	at Kentucky*	#2	Kentucky Proud Park • Lexington, KY	**W** 5–4	**Riojas** (7–1)	Cleaver (3–2)	**Saunier** (1)	3,629	29–5	13–2	Box Score	Recap
April 15	6:30 p.m.	SECN+	UTRGV	#1	UFCU Disch–Falk Field • Austin, TX	**W** 11–4	**Bing** (2–0)	Limas (1–2)	None	7,163	30–5	–	Box Score	Recap
April 17	7:00 p.m.	SECN+	#8 Auburn*	#1	UFCU Disch–Falk Field • Austin, TX	**W** 3–2	**Grubbs** (6–0)	Myers (0–2)	**Volantis** (9)	7,211	31–5	14–2	Box Score	Recap
April 18	7:00 p.m.	SECN+	#8 Auburn*	#1	UFCU Disch–Falk Field • Austin, TX	**W** 8–3	**Harrison** (3–0)	Fisher (1–1)	None	7,290	32–5	15–2	Box Score	Recap
April 19	2:00 p.m.	SECN+	#8 Auburn*	#1	UFCU Disch–Falk Field • Austin, TX	**W** 14–2^{(7)}	**Flores** (4–1)	Alvarez (1–1)	None	7,328	33–5	16–2	Box Score	Recap
April 22	6:00 p.m.	ESPN+	at Texas State	#1	Bobcat Ballpark • San Marcos, TX	**W** 14–11	**Howard** (1–0)	Tovar (2–4)	**Burns** (3)	3,217	34–5	–	Box Score	Recap
April 25	7:00 p.m.	SECN	Texas A&M*; Lone Star Showdown	#1	UFCU Disch–Falk Field • Austin, TX	**W** 2–1	**Riojas** (8–1)	Prager (2–3)	**Volantis** (10)	7,942 (Note: 7,942 is the 10th-largest attendance to date at UFCU Disch–Falk Field)	35–5	17–2	Box Score	Recap
April 26	3:00 p.m.	ESPN2	Texas A&M*; Lone Star Showdown	#1	UFCU Disch–Falk Field • Austin, TX	**W** 3–2	**Harrison** (4–0)	Lamkin (3–5)	**Volantis** (11)	7,808	36–5	18–2	Box Score	Recap
April 27	3:00 p.m.	ESPN2	Texas A&M*; Lone Star Showdown	#1	UFCU Disch–Falk Field • Austin, TX	**W** 6–5	**Saunier** (1–0)	McCoy (3–2)	**Grubbs** (5)	7,930 (Note: 7,930 is the 12th-largest attendance to date at UFCU Disch–Falk Field. Combined with the rest of the weekend, it set the record for largest 3-Game series attendance to date at 23,680.)	37–5	19–2	Box Score	Recap
April 29	6:30 p.m.	SECN+	Prairie View A&M	#1	UFCU Disch–Falk Field • Austin, TX	**W** 11–2	**Bing** (3–0)	Herrera (0–1)	None	6,813	38–5	–	Box Score	Recap

May (4–6)
Date	Time (CT)	TV	Opponent	Rank	Stadium	Score	Win	Loss	Save	Attendance	Overall record	SEC Record	Box Score	Recap
May 1	6:00 p.m.	ESPN2	at #11 Arkansas*	#1	Baum–Walker Stadium • Fayetteville, AR	**L** 0–9	Root (6–3)	**Riojas** (8–2)	None	10,855	38–6	19–3	Box Score	Recap
May 2	7:00 p.m.	SECN	at #11 Arkansas*	#1	Baum–Walker Stadium • Fayetteville, AR	**L** 1–6	Wood (1–0)	**Harrison** (4–1)	None	11,074	38–7	19–4	Box Score	Recap
May 3	2:00 p.m.	SECN+	at #11 Arkansas*	#1	Baum–Walker Stadium • Fayetteville, AR	**L** 8–13	Carter (5–0)	**Burns** (0–2)	None	11,031	38–8	19–5	Box Score	Recap
May 6	6:30 p.m.	SECN+	Lamar	#1	UFCU Disch–Falk Field • Austin, TX	**W** 9–3	**Walker** (1–0)	Sutton (5–3)	**Hamilton** (1)	6,921	39–8	–	Box Score	Recap
May 9	6:30 p.m.	ESPNU	Florida*	#1	UFCU Disch–Falk Field • Austin, TX	**L** 2–8	Coppola (3–0)	**Riojas** (8–3)	None	7,149	39–9	19–6	Box Score	Recap
May 10	1:00 p.m.	SECN+	Florida*	#1	UFCU Disch–Falk Field • Austin, TX	**W** 5–2	**Burns**; 1–2	Jenkins (0–2)	**Volantis** (12)	7,073	40–9	20–6	Box Score	Recap
May 11	1:00 p.m.	SECN+	Florida*	#1	UFCU Disch–Falk Field • Austin, TX	**L** 1–4	King (5–2)	**Flores** (4–2)	None	7,021	40–10	20–7	Box Score	Recap
May 15	6:30 p.m.	SECN+	at Oklahoma*	#3	L. Dale Mitchell Baseball Park • Norman, OK	**W** 7–4	**Volantis** (4–0)	Crooks (2–1)	None	3,577	41–10	21–7	Box Score	Recap
May 16	6:30 p.m.	SECN+	at Oklahoma*	#3	L. Dale Mitchell Baseball Park • Norman, OK	**L** 3–8	Reid (4–1)	**Grubbs** (6–1)	Crooks (13)	5,177	41–11	21–8	Box Score	Recap
May 17	2:00 p.m.	SECN+	at Oklahoma*	#3	L. Dale Mitchell Baseball Park • Norman, OK	**W** 9–1	**Harrison** (5–1)	M. Witherspoon (3–8)	**Burns** (4)	4,844	42–11	22–8	Box Score	Recap

Postseason (2–3)

SEC Tournament (0–1)
Date	Time (CT)	TV	Opponent	Rank (Seed)	Stadium	Score	Win	Loss	Save	Attendance	Overall record	Tournament Record	Box Score	Recap
May 22	3:00 p.m.	SECN	vs. #21 (8) Tennessee	#2 (1)	Hoover Metropolitan Stadium • Hoover, AL	**L** 5–7^{(12)}	Snead (4–1)	**Volantis** (4–1)	None	10,135	42–12	0–1	Box Score	Recap

NCAA Austin Regional (2–2)
Date	Time (CT)	TV	Opponent	Rank (Seed)	Stadium	Score	Win	Loss	Save	Attendance	Overall record	Tournament Record	Box Score	Recap
May 30	1:00 p.m.	ESPN+	(4) Houston Christian	#4 (1)	UFCU Disch–Falk Field • Austin, TX	**W** 7–1	**Saunier** (2–0)	Edwards (3–5)	**Hamilton** (2)	7,673	43–12	1–0	Box Score	Recap
May 31	8:00 p.m.	SECN	(2) UTSA	#4 (1)	UFCU Disch–Falk Field • Austin, TX	**L** 7–9	Dove (3–0)	**Grubbs** (6–2)	Owens (3)	7,953	43–13	1–1	Box Score	Recap
June 1	2:00 p.m.	ESPN	(3) Kansas State	#4 (1)	UFCU Disch–Falk Field • Austin, TX	**W** 15–8	**Riojas** (9–3)	Williams (2–3)	None	7,231	44–13	2–1	Box Score	Recap
June 1	7:00 p.m.	ESPN+	(2) UTSA	#4 (1)	UFCU Disch–Falk Field • Austin, TX	**L** 4–7	Brown (4–2)	**Hamilton** (0–1)	Orloski (9)	7,407	44–14	2–2	Box Score	Recap

Schedule Notes

=== Postseason ===
==== SEC Tournament ====
**First round** May 20 & 21; SEC Network
**9**	**Alabama**	**4**
16	Missouri	1
**12**	**Oklahoma**	**5**
13	Kentucky	1
**10**	**Florida**	**11**
15	South Carolina	3
11	Mississippi State	0
**14**	**Texas A&M**	**9**

**Second round** May 21 & 22; SEC Network
**8**	**Tennessee**	**15**
9	Alabama	10
5	Georgia	2
**12**	**Oklahoma**	**3**
**7**	**Ole Miss**	**3**
10	Florida	1
6	Auburn	2
**14**	**Texas A&M**	**3**

**Quarterfinals**; May 22 & 23; SEC Network
1	Texas	5
**8**	**Tennessee**	**7**^{12}
**4**	**Vanderbilt**	**6**
12	Oklahoma	1
2	Arkansas	2
**7**	**Ole Miss**	**5**
**3**	**LSU**	**4**
14	Texas A&M	3

**Semifinals**; May 24; SEC Network
8	Tennessee	0
**4**	**Vanderbilt**	**10**^{7}
**7**	**Ole Miss**	**2**
3	LSU	0

**Championship**; May 25; ESPN2
**4**	**Vanderbilt**	**3**
7	Ole Miss	2

==== NCAA Tournament ====
Hosted by UCLA at Jackie Robinson Stadium

Regional	Regional
**1**	**Texas**	**7**
4	Houston Christian	1
1	Texas	7
**2**	**UTSA**	**9**
3	Kansas State	2
**2**	**UTSA**	**10**
Austin Regional – UFCU Disch–Falk Field
4	Houston Christian	4
**3**	**Kansas State**	**7**
3	Kansas State	8
**1**	**Texas**	**15**
**1**	**UCLA**	**19**
4	Fresno State	4
**1**	**UCLA**	**11**
3	Arizona State	5
**3**	**Arizona State**	**4**
2	UC Irvine	2
Los Angeles Regional – Jackie Robinson Stadium
4	Fresno State	3
**2**	**UC Irvine**	**8**
**2**	**UC Irvine**	**11**
3	Arizona State	6

Regional Final
**2**	**UTSA**	**7**	–
1	Texas	4	–
**1**	**UCLA**	**8**	–
2	UC Irvine	5	–

Super Regional; June 7–9
UTSA	2	0	–
**15**	**UCLA**	**5**	**7**	–

== Awards and honors ==
=== SEC awards and honors ===
SEC Weekly honors
Honors	Player	Position	Date Awarded	Ref.
SEC Pitcher of the Week	Luke Harrison	P	February 17, 2025	
SEC Co-Freshman of the Week	Adrian Rodriguez	IF	February 17, 2025	
SEC Freshman of the Week	Dylan Volantis	P	March 24, 2025	

== Record vs. conference opponents ==
Blank are not scheduled. Blue are home games, otherwise away.

2025 SEC baseball records Source: 2025 SEC baseball game results, 2025 SEC baseball schedule
Tm	W–L	ALA	ARK	AUB	FLA	UGA	KEN	LSU	MSU	MIZ	OKL	OMS	SCA	TEN	TEX	TAM	VAN	Tm	SR	SW
ALA	16–14		.	1–2	1–2	2–1	.	1–2	1–2	3–0	2–1	.	.	1–2	.	3–0	1–2	ALA	4–6	2–0
ARK	20–10	.		.	1–2	1–2	.	1–2	.	3–0	.	2–1	3–0	2–1	3–0	1–2	3–0	ARK	6–4	4–0
AUB	17–13	2–1	.		.	0–3	2–1	3–0	2–1	.	.	1–2	3–0	2–1	0–3	.	2–1	AUB	7–3	2–2
FLA	15–15	2–1	2–1	.		0–3	.	.	2–1	3–0	.	1–2	3–0	0–3	2–1	.	0–3	FLA	6–4	2–3
UGA	18–12	1–2	2–1	3–0	3–0		2–1	.	.	3–0	2–1	.	.	.	0–3	2–1	0–3	UGA	7–3	3–2
KEN	13–17	.	.	1–2	.	1–2		.	0–3	.	3–0	1–2	2–1	2–1	1–2	2–1	0–3	KEN	4–6	1–2
LSU	19–11	2–1	2–1	0–3	.	.	.		3–0	3–0	3–0	.	2–1	2–1	1–2	1–2	.	LSU	7–3	3–1
MSU	15–15	2–1	.	1–2	1–2	.	3–0	0–3		3–0	1–2	2–1	2–1	.	0–3	.	.	MSU	5–5	2–2
MIZ	3–27	0–3	0–3	.	0–3	0–3	.	0–3	0–3		0–3	0–3	.	.	0–3	3–0	.	MIZ	1–9	1–9
OKL	14–16	1–2	.	.	.	1–2	0–3	0–3	2–1	3–0		2–1	2–1	.	1–2	.	2–1	OKL	5–5	1–2
OMS	16–14	.	1–2	2–1	2–1	.	2–1	.	1–2	3–0	1–2		1–2	1–2	.	.	2–1	OMS	5–5	1–0
SCA	6–24	.	0–3	0–3	0–3	.	1–2	1–2	1–2	.	1–2	2–1		0–3	.	0–3	.	SCA	1–9	0–5
TEN	16–14	2–1	1–2	1–2	3–0	.	1–2	1–2	.	.	.	2–1	3–0		.	1–2	1–2	TEN	4–6	2–0
TEX	22–8	.	0–3	3–0	1–2	3–0	2–1	2–1	3–0	3–0	2–1	.	.	.		3–0	.	TEX	8–2	5–1
TAM	11–19	0–3	2–1	.	.	1–2	1–2	2–1	.	0–3	.	.	3–0	2–1	0–3		0–3	TAM	4–6	1–4
VAN	19–11	2–1	0–3	1–2	3–0	3–0	3–0	.	.	.	1–2	1–2	.	2–1	.	3–0		VAN	6–4	4–1
Tm	W–L	ALA	ARK	AUB	FLA	UGA	KEN	LSU	MSU	MIZ	OKL	OMS	SCA	TEN	TEX	TAM	VAN	Team	SR	SW

Updated for entire regular season.
Tie brkrs: LSU>VAN ARK common, OMS>TEN & OMS>ALA VAN common, TEN>ALA hd to hd, FLA>MSU hd to hd.

== Rankings ==
Ranking movements Legend: ██ Increase in ranking ██ Decrease in ranking ( ) = First-place votes
	Week																		
Poll	Pre	1	2	3	4	5	6	7	8	9	10	11	12	13	14	15	16	17	Final
Coaches'	13	13*	14	9	9	7	7	5	2 (2)	1 (23)	1 (29)	1 (30)	1 (12)	3 (1)	2 (3)	2 (4)	2 (4)*	2 (4)*	12
Baseball America	14	12	12	12	9	5	3	3	2	1	1	1	2	6	5	5*	5*	5*	18
NCBWA†	17	16	15	15	10	9	7	6	2	1	1	1	2	2	2	4	4*	4*	17
D1Baseball	19	16	15	12	11	8	7	5	2	1	1	1	1	3	2	4	4*	4*	17
Perfect Game	7	7	6	6	6	6	5	5	2	1	1	1	3	8	6	6*	6*	6*	18

† NCBWA ranks 30 teams in their preseason poll, but only ranks 25 teams weekly during the season.
* A new poll was not released for this week, so for comparison purposes, the previous week's ranking is inserted in this week's slot.
