= Gage Wood =

American baseball player (born 2003)

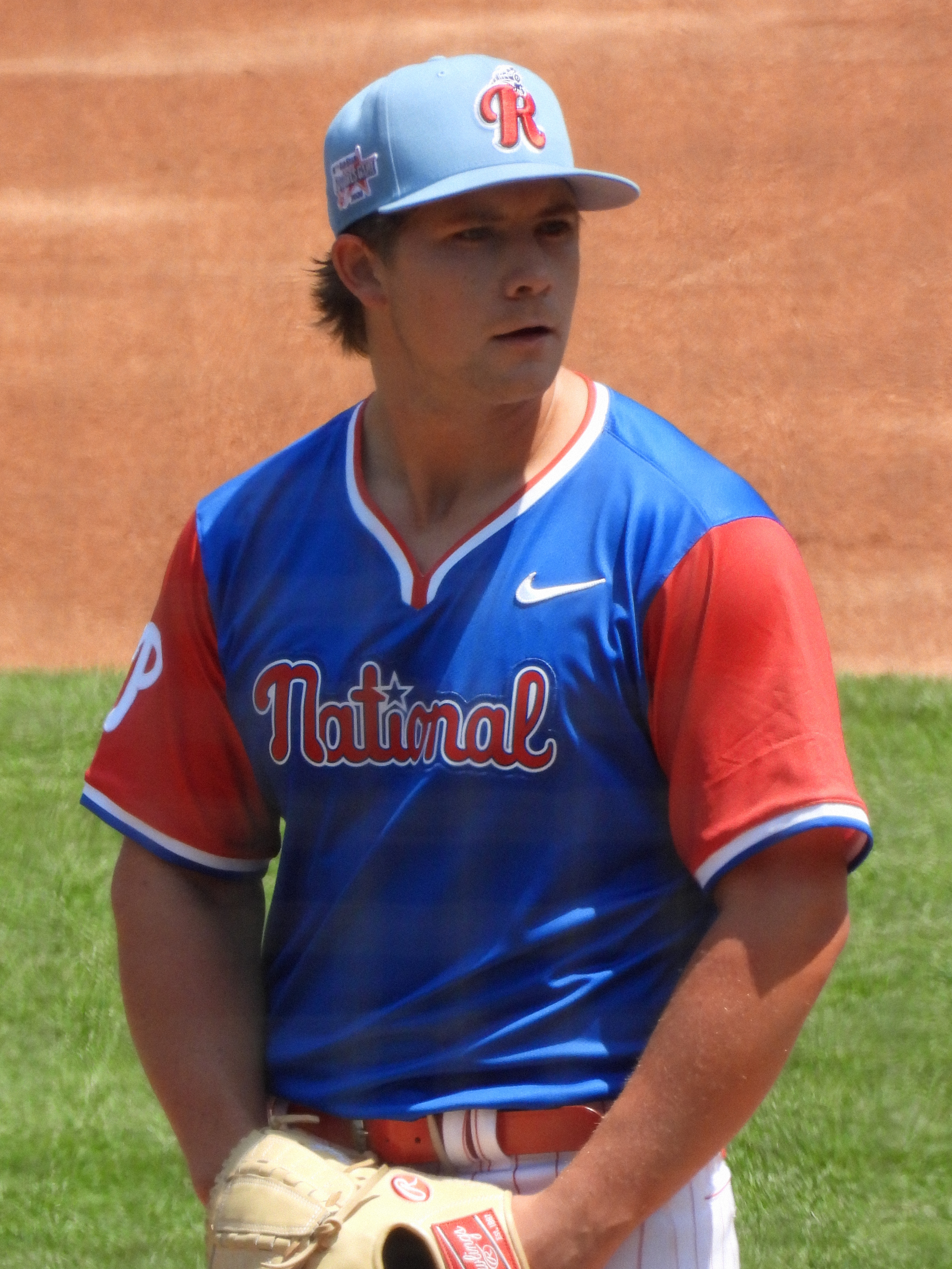
- Wood pitching for the National League Futures in 2026

Philadelphia Phillies
- Pitcher
- Born: December 15, 2003 (age 22); Newport, Arkansas, U.S.
- Bats: Right Throws: Right
- Stats at Baseball Reference

Austin Gage Wood (born December 15, 2003) is an American professional baseball pitcher in the Philadelphia Phillies organization.

== Amateur career ==
Wood attended Batesville High School in Batesville, Arkansas, where he played baseball. He earned All-State honors as a senior in 2022. He went unselected in the 2022 Major League Baseball draft and fulfilled his commitment to play college baseball at the University of Arkansas.

As a freshman at Arkansas in 2023, Wood appeared in 23 games in relief and went 2–0 with a 4.80 ERA, five saves, and 42 strikeouts over thirty innings. As a sophomore in 2024, he appeared in 22 games and pitched to a 3–2 record, a 4.46 ERA, and 56 strikeouts over 40 1/3 innings. After the season, he played in the Cape Cod Baseball League with the Falmouth Commodores.

Wood moved into Arkansas' starting rotation for the 2025 season. He missed time in February, March, and April due to a shoulder injury. On June 16, 2025, Wood threw the third no-hitter in College World Series history and struck out 19 batters in a 3-0 win against the Murray State Racers. Over ten starts for the season, Wood went 4–1 with a 3.82 ERA and 69 strikeouts over 37 2/3 innings.

== Professional career ==
Wood was selected by the Philadelphia Phillies in the first round with the 26th overall pick of the 2025 Major League Baseball draft. He signed with the team on July 22 for $3 million. After signing, Wood made his professional debut with the Single-A Clearwater Threshers. In his lone start for the season, he pitched two innings in which he allowed one run and struck out five batters.

Wood returned to Clearwater to open the 2026 season. On May 18, he was promoted to the Double-A Reading Fightin Phils after eight starts with Clearwater where he posted a 3.42 ERA, 40 strikeouts and 12 walks in 26 1/3 innings. Wood was selected to represent the Phillies at the 2026 All-Star Futures Game alongside Wen-Hui Pan. He was the starting pitcher for the National League and gave up one run across one inning. Across 17 starts with Reading, Wood had a 1–3 record, a 4.72 ERA, and 99 strikeouts over 68 2/3 innings.
