= 2025 Georgia Bulldogs baseball team =

2025 season of University of Georgia baseball team

2025 Georgia Bulldogs baseball

Athens Regional, 1–2
- Conference: Southeastern Conference

Ranking
- Coaches: No. 15
- D1Baseball.com: No. 19
- Record: 43–17 (18–12 SEC)
- Head coach: Wes Johnson (2nd season)
- Assistant coaches: Will Coggin; Nick Ammirati; Brock Bennett
- Home stadium: Foley Field

2025 Southeastern Conference baseball standings
	Conf.				Overall
Team	W		L	PCT	W		L	PCT
No. 17 Texas ‍†‍‍^{y}	22	–	8	.733	44	–	14	.759
No. 3 Arkansas ‍‍‍^{y}	20	–	10	.667	50	–	15	.769
No. 1 LSU ‍‍‍^{y}	19	–	11	.633	53	–	15	.779
No. 18 Vanderbilt ‍‍‡‍^{y}	19	–	11	.633	43	–	18	.705
No. 19 Georgia ‍‍‍^{y}	18	–	12	.600	43	–	17	.717
No. 11 Auburn ‍‍‍^{y}	17	–	13	.567	41	–	20	.672
No. 21 Ole Miss ‍‍‍^{y}	16	–	14	.533	43	–	21	.672
No. 12 Tennessee ‍‍‍^{y}	16	–	14	.533	46	–	19	.708
Alabama ‍‍‍^{y}	16	–	14	.533	41	–	18	.695
Florida ‍‍‍^{y}	15	–	15	.500	39	–	22	.639
Mississippi State ‍‍‍^{y}	15	–	15	.500	36	–	23	.610
Oklahoma ‍‍‍^{y}	14	–	16	.467	38	–	22	.633
Kentucky ‍‍‍^{y}	13	–	17	.433	31	–	26	.544
Texas A&M ‍‍‍	11	–	19	.367	30	–	26	.536
South Carolina ‍‍‍	6	–	24	.200	28	–	29	.491
Missouri ‍‍‍	3	–	27	.100	16	–	39	.291
† – Conference champion ‡ – Tournament champion y – Invited to the NCAA Tournament; As of June 22, 2025; Rankings from D1Baseball

The 2025 Georgia Bulldogs baseball team represented the University of Georgia in the 2025 NCAA Division I baseball season. The Bulldogs played their home games for the 69th season at Foley Field as a member of the Southeastern Conference. They were led by head coach Wes Johnson, in his second year as head coach.

== Previous season ==
The Bulldogs finished 43–17, 17–13 in the SEC to finish in third place in the East division. They were invited to play in the 2024 NCAA Division I baseball tournament, were they hosted the Athens Super Regional. The Bulldogs defeated Army, UNC Wilmington, and Georgia Tech en route to the Super Regional to play NC State. The Wolfpack won the first game 18–1, before the Bulldogs took the second game 11–2. In the elimination game, NC State ended the Bulldogs season, winning 8–5.

== Personnel ==
=== Roster ===
2025 Georgia Bulldogs roster
Pitchers: 3 - Zach Harris - Junior; 6 - Jordan Stephens - Sophomore; 7 - Brian Curley - Junior; 8 - Davis Chastain - Junior; 12 - Leighton Finley - Junior; 13 - Asher Sabom - Freshman; 15 - Matthew Hoskins - Junior; 16 - Kolten Smith - Junior; 22 - JT Quinn - Junior; 26 - Brian Zeldin - Graduate; 29 - Charlie Goldstein - Graduate; 31 - Eric Hammond - (redshirt) Junior; 32 - Logan Spivey - Senior; 33 - Nate Taylor - Freshman; 34 - Tyler McLoughlin - (redshirt) Senior; 35 - Paul Farley - (redshirt) Freshman; 37 - Zach Brown - Sophomore; 38 - DJ Radtke - (redshirt) Junior; 39 - Wyatt Land - Sophomore; 40 - Justin Byrd - Junior; 42 - Alton Davis II - Junior; 43 - Luke Wiltrakis - Sophomore; 45 - Bradley Stewart - Sophomore; 47 - Collin Caldwell - Graduate; 51 - Lucas Morici - Junior; - Ethan Sutton - (redshirt) Freshman	Catchers: 11 - Henry Hunter - Senior; 25 - Daniel Jackson - Sophomore; Infielders: 1 - Tre Phelps - Sophomore; 2 - Ryan Black - Junior; 4 - Erik Parker - Freshman; 9 - Kolby Branch - Junior; 14 - Trey King - Sophomore; 17 - Cade Brown - Freshman; 18 - TL Saxon - Junior; 44 - Slate Alford - Senior; 49 - Alexander Sifford - Freshman	Outfielders: 19 - Nolan McCarthy - Graduate; 21 - Devin Obee - Senior; 23 - John Marant - (redshirt) Senior; 25 - Dylan Goldstein - Graduate; 40 - Cooper Milford - Freshman; Utility: 0 - Bryce Clavon (INF/OF) - Freshman; 5 - Christian Adams (INF/OF) - Graduate; 10 - Robbie Burnett (INF/OF) - Senior; 20 - Ryland Zaborowski (INF/OF) - Graduate; 28 - Brennan Hudson (C/INF/OF) - Junior; 46 - Charlie Jones (INF/OF) - Junior

=== Coaching staff ===
2025 Georgia Bulldogs coaching staff
Name	Position	Seasons at Georgia	Alma mater
Wes Johnson	Head coach	2	Arkansas–Monticello (1994)
Will Coggin	Assistant coach	2	Mississippi State (2008)
Nick Ammirati	Assistant coach	1	Mississippi State (2013)
Brock Bennett	Assistant coach	2	Alabama (2011)

== Schedule and results ==
2025 Georgia Bulldogs baseball game log (43–17)
Regular season (42–14)

February (10–1)
Date	Opponent	Rank	Site/Stadium	Score	Win	Loss	Save	TV	Attendance	Overall record	SEC Record
February 14	vs. Quinnipiac	No. 8	Brooks Field; Wilmington, NC	**W** 9–1	**Farley (1–0)**	Lajoie (0–1)	None	None	–	1–0	–
February 15	vs. Quinnipiac	No. 8	Brooks Field	**W** 7–4	**Chastain (1–0)**	Gannon (0–1)	**Radtke (1)**	None	2,432	2–0	–
February 15	at UNC Wilmington	No. 8	Brooks Field	**W** 7–3	**Davis II (1–0)**	Smith (0–1)	None	FloSports	2,432	3–0	–
February 16	at UNC Wilmington	No. 8	Brooks Field	**L** 2–6	Marshburn (1–0)	**Brown (0–1)**	None	FloSports	1,527	3–1	–
February 18	at Kennesaw State	No. 8	S. Walter Kelly Sr. Memorial Field; Marietta, GA	**W** 6–4	**McLoughlin (1–0)**	Helman (0–1)	**Curley (1)**	ESPN+	930	4–1	–
February 21	UIC	No. 8	Foley Field; Athens, GA	**W** 9–3	**Brown (1–1)**	Schueler (0–2)	None	SECN+	2,974	5–1	–
February 21	UIC	No. 8	Foley Field	**W** 15–1^{7}	**Finley (1–0)**	Jibben (0–1)	None	SECN+	2,974	6–1	–
February 22	UIC	No. 8	Foley Field	**W** 10–4	**Davis II (2–0)**	Millsap (0–1)	**Hoskins (1)**	SECN+	3,633	7–1	–
February 23	UIC	No. 8	Foley Field	**W** 17–3^{6}	**Radtke (1–0)**	Lyons (0–1)	**Stephens (1)**	SECN+	2,870	8–1	–
February 26	at Georgia State	No. 6	GSU Baseball Complex; Decatur, GA	**W** 7–3	**Chastain (2–0)**	Norman (1–1)	None	None	515	9–1	–
February 28	Florida Gulf Coast	No. 6	Foley Field	**W** 10–9	**Stephens (2–0)**	Giannoni (0–1)	None	SECN+	1,378	10–1	–

March (18–1)
Date	Opponent	Rank	Site/Stadium	Score	Win	Loss	Save	TV	Attendance	Overall record	SEC Record
March 1	Florida Gulf Coast	No. 6	Foley Field	**W** 10–0^{7}	**Brown (2–1)**	Eldem (0–2)	None	SECN+	2,456	11–1	–
March 1	Florida Gulf Coast	No. 6	Foley Field	**W** 9–8^{10}	**Curley (1–0)**	Dempsey (0–1)	None	SECN+	1,234	12–1	–
March 2	Florida Gulf Coast	No. 6	Foley Field	**W** 4–3	**Stephens (2–0)**	Vera (0–3)	None	SECN+	1,593	13–1	–
March 4	High Point	No. 5	Foley Field	**W** 8–4	**Radtke (2–0)**	Butler (1–2)	None	SECN+	844	14–1	–
March 5	Georgia State	No. 5	Foley Field	**W** 16–10	**Chastain (3–0)**	Roberts (1–1)	None	SECN+	910	15–1	–
March 7	Columbia	No. 5	Foley Field	**W** 14–5	**Brown (3–1)**	Sotiropoulos (1–2)	**Stephens (2)**	SECN+	1,154	16–1	–
March 8	Columbia	No. 5	Foley Field	**W** 16–6^{7}	**Smith (1–0)**	Santana (0–2)	None	SECN+	2,824	17–1	–
March 9	Columbia	No. 5	Foley Field	**W** 9–7	**McLoughlin (2–0)**	Sheets (0–2)	**Curley (2)**	SECN+	1,776	18–1	–
March 11	ETSU	No. 4	Foley Field	**W** 8–6	**Harris (1–0)**	Oliff (1–2)	None	SECN+	1,242	19–1	–
March 14	Kentucky	No. 4	Foley Field	**W** 12–6	**Radtke (3–0)**	Nove (0–2)	None	SECN+	3,633	20–1	1–0
March 15	Kentucky	No. 4	Foley Field	**L** 7–10	Adcock (1–0)	**Hoskins (0–1)**	Rouse (1)	SECN+	3,633	20–2	1–1
March 16	Kentucky	No. 4	Foley Field	**W** 17–10	**Zeldin (1–0)**	Gregersen (0–1)	None	SECN+	3,282	21–2	2–1
March 21	at No. 13 Florida	No. 4	Condron Ballpark; Gainesville, FL	**W** 8–7	**Stephens (3–0)**	Philpott (0–1)	**Smith** (1)	SECN+	7,848	22–2	3–1
March 22	at No. 13 Florida	No. 4	Condron Ballpark	**W** 17–2	**Curley (2–0)**	Barlow (1–2)	None	SECN	8,160	23–2	4–1
March 23	at No. 13 Florida	No. 4	Condron Ballpark	**W** 15–4^{7}	**Finley (2–0)**	Clemente (1–1)	None	SECN+	7,579	24–2	5–1
March 25	West Georgia	No. 3	Foley Field	**W** 13–6	**McLoughlin (3–0)**	Quiles (0–3)	None	SECN+	2,215	25–2	–
March 28	No. 11 Auburn	No. 3	Foley Field	**W** 4–1	**Smith (2–0)**	Dutton (3–2)	**Radtke** (2)	SECN+	3,633	26–2	6–1
March 29	No. 11 Auburn	No. 3	Foley Field	**W** 11–7	**McLoughlin (4–0)**	Armstrong (1–1)	**Quinn** (1)	SECN+	2,774	27–2	7–1
March 29	No. 11 Auburn	No. 3	Foley Field	**W** 9–6^{10}	**Radtke (4–0)**	Murphy (0–1)	None	SECN	3,633	28–2	8–1

April (8–9)
Date	Opponent	Rank	Site/Stadium	Score	Win	Loss	Save	TV	Attendance	Overall record	SEC Record
April 1	Queens	No. 3	Foley Field	**W** 21–1^{7}	**Harris (2–0)**	Brown (0–3)	None	SECN+	1,714	29–2	–
April 4	at No. 5 Texas	No. 3	UFCU Disch–Falk Field; Austin, TX	**L** 1–5	Spencer (4–1)	**Goldstein (0–1)**	Volantis (1)	SECN+	7,246	29–3	8–2
April 5	at No. 5 Texas	No. 3	UFCU Disch–Falk Field	**L** 4–7	Grubbs (4–0)	**Smith (2–1)**	None	SECN+	7,192	29–4	8–3
April 6	at No. 5 Texas	No. 3	UFCU Disch–Falk Field	**L** 3–4^{10}	Volantis (3–0)	**Zeldin (1–1)**	None	SECN+	6,974	29–5	8–4
April 8	Presbyterian	No. 7	Foley Field	**W** 16–2^{7}	**Hoskins (1–1)**	Harrell (0–2)	None	SECN+	2,848	30–5	–
April 11	No. 1 Arkansas	No. 7	Foley Field	**L** 3–13	Jimenez (4–0)	**Quinn (0–1)**	None	SECN+	3,633	30–6	8–5
April 12	No. 1 Arkansas	No. 7	Foley Field	**W** 7–6	**Smith (3–1)**	Gaeckle (2–1)	**Hoskins** (2)	SECN+	3,633	31–6	9–5
April 13	No. 1 Arkansas	No. 7	Foley Field	**W** 7–6^{12}	**Zeldin (2–1)**	Gibler (1–1)	None	SECN+	3,633	32–6	10–5
April 15	vs. No. 14 Georgia Tech	No. 5	Truist Park; Cumberland, GA	**W** 5–2	**Davis II (3–0)**	Ballard (1–3)	**Stephens** (3)	None	15,000	33–6	–
April 17	at No. 19 Vanderbilt	No. 5	Hawkins Field; Nashville, TN	**L** 1–3	Thompson (3–3)	**Curley (2–1)**	Hawks (5)	SECN+	3,802	33–7	10–6
April 18	at No. 19 Vanderbilt	No. 5	Hawkins Field	**L** 7–13	Kranzler (6–1)	**Smith (2–1)**	None	SECN+	3,802	33–8	10–7
April 19	at No. 19 Vanderbilt	No. 5	Hawkins Field	**L** 2–5	Fennell (4–0)	**Finley (2–1)**	Hawks (6)	SECN+	3,802	33–9	10–8
April 22	at No. 2 Clemson	No. 10	Doug Kingsmore Stadium; Clemson, SC	**L** 0–3	McGovern (3–0)	**Goldstein (0–2)**	Mahlstedt (15)	ESPNU	6,584	33–10	–
April 24	No. 14 Oklahoma	No. 10	Foley Field	**L** 6–8	K. Witherspoon (8–2)	**Curley (2–2)**	Crooks (10)	ESPNU	3,042	33–11	10–9
April 25	No. 14 Oklahoma	No. 10	Foley Field	**W** 10–9	**Harris (3–0)**	Crossland (3–3)	None	SECN+	3,106	34–11	11–9
April 26	No. 14 Oklahoma	No. 10	Foley Field	**W** 6–3	**Davis II (4–0)**	M. Witherspoon (3–5)	**McLoughlin** (1)	SECN+	3,633	35–11	12–9
April 29	Kennesaw State	No. 9	Foley Field	**W** 9–2	**Stephens (4–0)**	Helman (0–2)	None	SECN	3,633	36–11	–

May (6–3)
Date	Opponent	Rank	Site/Stadium	Score	Win	Loss	Save	TV	Attendance	Overall record	SEC Record
May 2	at Missouri	No. 9	Taylor Stadium; Columbia, MO	**W** 9–2	**Curley (3–2)**	Kehlenbrink (0–4)	None	SECN+	1,647	37–11	13–9
May 3	at Missouri	No. 9	Taylor Stadium	**W** 5–2	**Smith (4–2)**	Neubeck (0–3)	**Harris** (1)	SECN	1,794	38–11	14–9
May 4	at Missouri	No. 9	Taylor Stadium	**W** 4–2	**Davis II (5–0)**	Green (1–3)	**Harris** (2)	SECN+	1,631	39–11	15–9
May 9	at No. 23 Alabama	No. 6	Sewell–Thomas Stadium; Tuscaloosa, AL	**W** 19–3^{7}	**Curley (4–2)**	Fay (0–2)	None	SECN+	–	40–11	16–9
May 11	at No. 23 Alabama	No. 6	Sewell–Thomas Stadium	**L** 3–9	Myers (3–1)	**Smith (4–3)**	Ozmer (15)	SECN+	3,987	40–12	16–10
May 11	at No. 23 Alabama	No. 6	Sewell–Thomas Stadium	**L** 4–5^{7}	Adams (7–2)	**Finley (2–2)**	Ozmer (16)	SECN+	3,329	40–13	16–11
May 15	Texas A&M	No. 10	Foley Field	**W** 10–6	**Quinn (1–1)**	Prager (3–4)	**Harris** (3)	SECN+	3,633	41–13	17–11
May 16	Texas A&M	No. 10	Foley Field	**L** 0–6	Lamkin (4–7)	**Curley (4–3)**	None	SECN+	3,633	41–14	17–12
May 17	Texas A&M	No. 10	Foley Field	**W** 7–5	**Smith (5–3)**	Moss (6–3)	**Harris** (4)	SECN+	3,633	42–14	18–12

Postseason (1–3)

SEC Tournament (0–1)
Date	Opponent	Seed	Site/stadium	Score	Win	Loss	Save	TV	Attendance	Overall record	SECT Record
May 21	vs. (12) Oklahoma	(5) No. 10	Hoover Metropolitan Stadium; Hoover, AL	**L** 2–3	K. Witherspoon (10–3)	**Hoskins (1–2)**	Crooks (14)	SECN	11,117	42–15	0–1

NCAA tournament: Athens Regional (1–2)
Date	Opponent	Seed	Site/stadium	Score	Win	Loss	Save	TV	Attendance	Overall record	Regional record
May 30	(4) Binghamton	(1) No. 10	Foley Field	**W** 20–4	**Finley (3–2)**	Bouchard (3–5)	None	SECN	3,633	43–15	1–0
May 31	(2) Duke	(1) No. 10	Foley Field	**L** 3–6	Johnson (4–3)	**Curley (4–4)**	Tallon (2)	SECN	3,633	43–16	1–1
June 1	(3) Oklahoma State	(1) No. 10	Foley Field	**L** 9–11	Brown (1–0)	**Harris (3–1)**	None	ESPN2	3,120	43–17	1–2

Legend: = Win = Loss = Canceled
Bold = Georgia team member
Rankings are based on the team's current ranking in the D1Baseball poll.

=== Athens Regional ===
Athens Regional Teams
(1) Georgia Bulldogs	(2) Duke Blue Devils	(3) Oklahoma State Cowboys	(4) Binghamton Bearcats

First Round
**1**	**Georgia**	**20**
4	Binghamton	4
3	Oklahoma State	5
**2**	**Duke**	**12**
Lower round 1
4	Binghamton	5
**3**	**Oklahoma State**	**13**

Semi-Finals
1	Georgia	3
**2**	**Duke**	**6**
Lower final
1	Georgia	9
**3**	**Oklahoma State**	**11**

Finals
**2**	**Duke**	**3**	–
3	Oklahoma State	2	–

Athens Regional Round 1
(4) Binghamton Bearcats	vs.	(1) Georgia Bulldogs

May 30, 2025, 3:30 pm (EST) at Foley Field in Athens, Georgia
Team	1	2	3	4	5	6	7	8	9	R	H	E
(4) Binghamton	0	0	2	0	0	0	0	0	2	**4**	**6**	**1**
**(1) Georgia**	5	0	3	4	4	1	0	3	X	**20**	**15**	**0**
WP: Leighton Finley (3–2) LP: Brady Bouchard (3–5); Home runs: BING: None; UGA: Daniel Jackson (13, 14); Nolan McCarthy (11); Tre Phelps (9, 10); Attendance: 3,633

Athens Regional Round 2
(2) Duke Blue Devils	vs.	(1) Georgia Bulldogs

May 31, 2025, 6:00 pm (EST) at Foley Field in Athens, Georgia
Team	1	2	3	4	5	6	7	8	9	R	H	E
**(2) Duke**	0	0	3	0	1	0	0	0	2	**6**	**11**	**0**
(1) Georgia	0	1	0	0	0	1	0	0	1	**3**	**9**	**0**
WP: Kyle Johnson (4–3) LP: Brian Curley (4–4) Sv: James Tallon (2); Home runs: DUKE: Ben Miller (20); Wallace Clark (7, 8); UGA: Ryland Zaborowski (17); Henry Hunter (11); Attendance: 3,633

Athens Regional Lower Round Final
(1) Georgia Bulldogs	vs.	(3) Oklahoma State Cowboys

June 1, 2025, 12:00 pm (EST) at Foley Field in Athens, Georgia
Team	1	2	3	4	5	6	7	8	9	R	H	E
(1) Georgia	0	0	5	1	1	0	1	1	0	**9**	**11**	**1**
**(3) Oklahoma State**	1	2	0	0	4	0	0	0	4	**11**	**11**	**1**
WP: Matthew Brown (1–0) LP: Zach Harris (3–1); Home runs: UGA: Slate Alford (18, 19); Christian Adams (6, 7); OKST: Nolan Schubart (19); Kollin Ritchie (14); Alex Conover (6); Brock Thompson (8); Attendance: 3,120

== Record vs. conference opponents ==
Blank are not scheduled. Blue are home games, otherwise away.

2025 SEC baseball records Source: 2025 SEC baseball game results, 2025 SEC baseball schedule
Tm	W–L	ALA	ARK	AUB	FLA	UGA	KEN	LSU	MSU	MIZ	OKL	OMS	SCA	TEN	TEX	TAM	VAN	Tm	SR	SW
ALA	16–14		.	1–2	1–2	2–1	.	1–2	1–2	3–0	2–1	.	.	1–2	.	3–0	1–2	ALA	4–6	2–0
ARK	20–10	.		.	1–2	1–2	.	1–2	.	3–0	.	2–1	3–0	2–1	3–0	1–2	3–0	ARK	6–4	4–0
AUB	17–13	2–1	.		.	0–3	2–1	3–0	2–1	.	.	1–2	3–0	2–1	0–3	.	2–1	AUB	7–3	2–2
FLA	15–15	2–1	2–1	.		0–3	.	.	2–1	3–0	.	1–2	3–0	0–3	2–1	.	0–3	FLA	6–4	2–3
UGA	18–12	1–2	2–1	3–0	3–0		2–1	.	.	3–0	2–1	.	.	.	0–3	2–1	0–3	UGA	7–3	3–2
KEN	13–17	.	.	1–2	.	1–2		.	0–3	.	3–0	1–2	2–1	2–1	1–2	2–1	0–3	KEN	4–6	1–2
LSU	19–11	2–1	2–1	0–3	.	.	.		3–0	3–0	3–0	.	2–1	2–1	1–2	1–2	.	LSU	7–3	3–1
MSU	15–15	2–1	.	1–2	1–2	.	3–0	0–3		3–0	1–2	2–1	2–1	.	0–3	.	.	MSU	5–5	2–2
MIZ	3–27	0–3	0–3	.	0–3	0–3	.	0–3	0–3		0–3	0–3	.	.	0–3	3–0	.	MIZ	1–9	1–9
OKL	14–16	1–2	.	.	.	1–2	0–3	0–3	2–1	3–0		2–1	2–1	.	1–2	.	2–1	OKL	5–5	1–2
OMS	16–14	.	1–2	2–1	2–1	.	2–1	.	1–2	3–0	1–2		1–2	1–2	.	.	2–1	OMS	5–5	1–0
SCA	6–24	.	0–3	0–3	0–3	.	1–2	1–2	1–2	.	1–2	2–1		0–3	.	0–3	.	SCA	1–9	0–5
TEN	16–14	2–1	1–2	1–2	3–0	.	1–2	1–2	.	.	.	2–1	3–0		.	1–2	1–2	TEN	4–6	2–0
TEX	22–8	.	0–3	3–0	1–2	3–0	2–1	2–1	3–0	3–0	2–1	.	.	.		3–0	.	TEX	8–2	5–1
TAM	11–19	0–3	2–1	.	.	1–2	1–2	2–1	.	0–3	.	.	3–0	2–1	0–3		0–3	TAM	4–6	1–4
VAN	19–11	2–1	0–3	1–2	3–0	3–0	3–0	.	.	.	1–2	1–2	.	2–1	.	3–0		VAN	6–4	4–1
Tm	W–L	ALA	ARK	AUB	FLA	UGA	KEN	LSU	MSU	MIZ	OKL	OMS	SCA	TEN	TEX	TAM	VAN	Team	SR	SW

Updated for entire regular season.
Tiebreakers: LSU over Vanderbilt (comparing results vs. Arkansas), Ole Miss over Tennessee and Alabama (comparing results vs. Vanderbilt), Tennessee over Alabama (using head-to-head result), Florida over Mississippi State (using head-to-head result).

== Rankings ==
Ranking movements Legend: ██ Increase in ranking ██ Decrease in ranking т = Tied with team above or below ( ) = First-place votes
	Week																	
Poll	Pre	1	2	3	4	5	6	7	8	9	10	11	12	13	14	15	16	Final
Coaches'	9	9*	8	7т	5	5	3 (1)	3 (1)	6	5 (1)	9	7	6 (2)	8	8	6	6*	15
Baseball America	11	11	10	9	7	6	4	4	6	3	9	4	1	4	3	3*	3*	20
NCBWA†	13	12	9	8	7	5	2	3	7	5	9	9	7	6	7	9	19	19
D1Baseball	8	8	6	5	4	4	3	3	7	5	10	9	6	10	10	10	10*	19
Perfect Game	4	4	3	3	3	3	2	2	6	3	5	3	1	4	4	4*	4*	19

† NCBWA ranks 30 teams in their preseason poll, but only ranks 25 teams weekly during the season.
* A new poll was not released for this week, so for comparison purposes, the previous week's ranking is inserted in this week's slot.
