= 2025 Southeastern Conference baseball tournament =

2025 baseball tournament

- Teams: 16
- Format: Double bye single elimination
- Finals site: Hoover Metropolitan Stadium; Hoover, AL
- Champions: Vanderbilt (5th title)
- Runner-up: Ole Miss (4th title game)
- Winning coach: Tim Corbin (4th title)
- MVP: Brodie Johnston (Vanderbilt)
- Attendance: 159,984
- Television: SEC Network, ESPN2

2025 Southeastern Conference baseball standings
	Conf.				Overall
Team	W		L	PCT	W		L	PCT
No. 17 Texas ‍†‍‍^{y}	22	–	8	.733	44	–	14	.759
No. 3 Arkansas ‍‍‍^{y}	20	–	10	.667	50	–	15	.769
No. 1 LSU ‍‍‍^{y}	19	–	11	.633	53	–	15	.779
No. 18 Vanderbilt ‍‍‡‍^{y}	19	–	11	.633	43	–	18	.705
No. 19 Georgia ‍‍‍^{y}	18	–	12	.600	43	–	17	.717
No. 11 Auburn ‍‍‍^{y}	17	–	13	.567	41	–	20	.672
No. 21 Ole Miss ‍‍‍^{y}	16	–	14	.533	43	–	21	.672
No. 12 Tennessee ‍‍‍^{y}	16	–	14	.533	46	–	19	.708
Alabama ‍‍‍^{y}	16	–	14	.533	41	–	18	.695
Florida ‍‍‍^{y}	15	–	15	.500	39	–	22	.639
Mississippi State ‍‍‍^{y}	15	–	15	.500	36	–	23	.610
Oklahoma ‍‍‍^{y}	14	–	16	.467	38	–	22	.633
Kentucky ‍‍‍^{y}	13	–	17	.433	31	–	26	.544
Texas A&M ‍‍‍	11	–	19	.367	30	–	26	.536
South Carolina ‍‍‍	6	–	24	.200	28	–	29	.491
Missouri ‍‍‍	3	–	27	.100	16	–	39	.291
† – Conference champion ‡ – Tournament champion y – Invited to the NCAA Tournament; As of June 22, 2025; Rankings from D1Baseball

The 2025 Southeastern Conference baseball tournament was the postseason baseball tournament for the Southeastern Conference for the 2025 NCAA Division I baseball season. The tournament was held May 20–25 at Hoover Metropolitan Stadium in Hoover, Alabama. The tournament champion, Vanderbilt, earned the conference's automatic bid to the 2025 NCAA Division I baseball tournament

This was the 26th consecutive year and 28th overall that the event was held at Hoover Metropolitan Stadium.

== Format and seeding ==
All 16 members of the SEC participated in the event; the previous format included 12 of the conference's 14 teams. Teams were seeded based on conference record. The top 4 seeds earned a double-bye to the quarterfinals, and seeds 5–8 earned a bye to the second round. The tournament was conducted in a single-elimination format. This was the first year of this format.

Seed	School	W–L	Pct	GB	Tiebreaker
1	Texas	22–8	.733	–	
2	Arkansas	20–10	.667	2	
3	LSU	19–11	.633	3	10–5 vs. common opponents
4	Vanderbilt	19–11	.633	3	9–6 vs. common opponents
5	Georgia	18–12	.600	4	
6	Auburn	17–13	.567	5	
7	Ole Miss	16–14	.533	6	6–3 vs. common opponents
8	Tennessee	16–14	.533	6	5–4 vs. common opponents, 2–1 vs. Alabama
9	Alabama	16–14	.533	6	3–6 vs. common opponents, 1–2 vs. Tennessee
10	Florida	15–15	.500	7	2–1 vs. Mississippi State
11	Mississippi State	15–15	.500	7	1–2 vs. Florida
12	Oklahoma	14–16	.467	8	
13	Kentucky	13–17	.433	9	
14	Texas A&M	11–19	.367	11	
15	South Carolina	6–24	.200	16	
16	Missouri	3–27	.100	19	

== Bracket ==
First round May 20 & 21; SEC Network
9	Alabama	4
16	Missouri	1
12	Oklahoma	5
13	Kentucky	1
10	Florida	11
15	South Carolina	3
11	Mississippi State	0
14	Texas A&M	9

Second round May 21 & 22; SEC Network
8	Tennessee	15
9	Alabama	10
5	Georgia	2
12	Oklahoma	3
7	Ole Miss	3
10	Florida	1
6	Auburn	2
14	Texas A&M	3

Quarterfinals; May 22 & 23; SEC Network
1	Texas	5
8	Tennessee	7^{12}
4	Vanderbilt	6
12	Oklahoma	1
2	Arkansas	2
7	Ole Miss	5
3	LSU	4
14	Texas A&M	3

Semifinals; May 24; SEC Network
8	Tennessee	0
4	Vanderbilt	10^{7}
7	Ole Miss	2
3	LSU	0

Championship; May 25; ESPN2
4	Vanderbilt	3
7	Ole Miss	2

== Schedule ==
Game	Time	Matchup	Score	Television	Attendance
First round – Tuesday, May 20
1	9:30 am	No. 9 Alabama vs. No. 16 Missouri	4−1	SECN	6,525
2	1:00 pm	No. 12 Oklahoma vs. No. 13 Kentucky	5−1	SECN	6,525
3	4:30 pm	No. 10 Florida vs. No. 15 South Carolina	11−3	SECN	7,242
First round/Second round – Wednesday, May 21
4	9:30 am	No. 11 Mississippi State vs. No. 14 Texas A&M	0−9	SECN	7,242
5	1:00 pm	No. 8 Tennessee vs. No. 9 Alabama	15−10	SECN	
6	4:30 pm	No. 5 Georgia vs. No. 12 Oklahoma	2–3	SECN	
7	8:00 pm	No. 7 Ole Miss vs. No. 10 Florida	3–1	SECN	
Second round/Quarterfinals – Thursday, May 22
8	11:00 am	No. 6 Auburn vs. No. 14 Texas A&M	2–3	SECN	10,135
9	3:00 pm	No. 1 Texas vs. No. 8 Tennessee	5–7^{12}	SECN	10,135
10	6:30 pm	No. 4 Vanderbilt vs. No. 12 Oklahoma	6–1	SECN	10,135
Quarterfinals – Friday, May 23
11	3:00 pm	No. 7 Ole Miss vs No. 2 Arkansas	5–2	SECN	13,627
12	6:30 pm	No. 14 Texas A&M vs No. 3 LSU	3–4	SECN	13,627
Semifinals – Saturday, May 24
13	12:00 pm	No. 8 Tennessee vs. No. 4 Vanderbilt	0–10^{7}	SECN	14,775
14	3:30 pm	No. 7 Ole Miss vs No. 3 LSU	2–0	SECN	14,775
Championship – Sunday, May 25
15	2:00 pm	No. 4 Vanderbilt vs. No. 7 Ole Miss	3–2	ESPN2	13,518
Game times in CT. Rankings denote tournament seeding.

== All–Tournament Team ==
Position	Player	Team
P	Hunter Elliott	Ole Miss
P	Connor Spencer	Ole Miss
C	Cannon Peebles	Tennessee
DH	Jace LaViolette	Texas A&M
1B	Riley Nelson	Vanderbilt
2B	Judd Utermark	Ole Miss
3B	**Brodie Johnston**	Vanderbilt
SS	Jaxon Willits	Oklahoma
OF	RJ Austin	Vanderbilt
OF	Hunter Ensley	Tennessee
OF	Richie Bonomolo Jr.	Alabama

MVP in bold
