= 2025 Auburn Tigers baseball team =

American college baseball season

2025 Auburn Tigers baseball

Auburn Regional champions

Auburn Super Regional, 0–2
- Conference: Southeastern Conference

Ranking
- Coaches: No. 10
- D1Baseball.com: No. 9
- Record: 41–20 (17–13 SEC)
- Head coach: Butch Thompson (10th season)
- Assistant coaches: Gabe Gross; Karl Nonemaker
- Home stadium: Plainsman Park

2025 Southeastern Conference baseball standings
| | Conf. | | | | Overall |
| Team | W | | L | PCT | W | | L | PCT |
|---|---|---|---|---|---|---|---|---|
| No. 17 Texas ‍†‍‍^{y} | 22 | – | 8 | .733 | 44 | – | 14 | .759 |
| No. 3 Arkansas ‍‍‍^{y} | 20 | – | 10 | .667 | 50 | – | 15 | .769 |
| No. 1 LSU ‍‍‍^{y} | 19 | – | 11 | .633 | 53 | – | 15 | .779 |
| No. 18 Vanderbilt ‍‍‡‍^{y} | 19 | – | 11 | .633 | 43 | – | 18 | .705 |
| No. 19 Georgia ‍‍‍^{y} | 18 | – | 12 | .600 | 43 | – | 17 | .717 |
| No. 11 Auburn ‍‍‍^{y} | 17 | – | 13 | .567 | 41 | – | 20 | .672 |
| No. 21 Ole Miss ‍‍‍^{y} | 16 | – | 14 | .533 | 43 | – | 21 | .672 |
| No. 12 Tennessee ‍‍‍^{y} | 16 | – | 14 | .533 | 46 | – | 19 | .708 |
| Alabama ‍‍‍^{y} | 16 | – | 14 | .533 | 41 | – | 18 | .695 |
| Florida ‍‍‍^{y} | 15 | – | 15 | .500 | 39 | – | 22 | .639 |
| Mississippi State ‍‍‍^{y} | 15 | – | 15 | .500 | 36 | – | 23 | .610 |
| Oklahoma ‍‍‍^{y} | 14 | – | 16 | .467 | 38 | – | 22 | .633 |
| Kentucky ‍‍‍^{y} | 13 | – | 17 | .433 | 31 | – | 26 | .544 |
| Texas A&M ‍‍‍ | 11 | – | 19 | .367 | 30 | – | 26 | .536 |
| South Carolina ‍‍‍ | 6 | – | 24 | .200 | 28 | – | 29 | .491 |
| Missouri ‍‍‍ | 3 | – | 27 | .100 | 16 | – | 39 | .291 |
† – Conference champion ‡ – Tournament champion y – Invited to the NCAA Tournament; As of June 22, 2025; Rankings from D1Baseball

The 2025 Auburn Tigers baseball team represented Auburn University in the 2025 NCAA Division I baseball season. The Tigers played their home games at Plainsman Park.

== Previous season ==
In 2024, the Tigers finished 27–26, 8–22 in conference. They finished 7th in the SEC West division.

== Personnel ==
=== Roster ===
2025 Auburn Tigers roster
| Pitchers: 3 – Cade Fisher – Junior; 9 – Jett Johnston – Sophomore; 13 – Ben Schorr – (redshirt) Senior; 17 – Samuel Dutton – Senior; 20 – Dylan Watts – Junior; 21 – Andreas Alvarez – Freshman; 22 – Hayden Murphy – Junior; 23 – Parker Carlson – Senior; 24 – Carson Myers – Senior; 25 – Connor Gatwood – Freshman; 27 – Christian Chatterton – Freshman; 28 – Ryan Hetzler – Sophomore; 32 – Griffin Graves – Sophomore; 33 – Mason Koch – Junior; 36 – Jackson Sanders – Freshman; 37 – Trevor Booton – (redshirt) Freshman; 38 – Connor McBride – Senior; 40 – Cam Tilly – Sophomore; 41 – John Armstrong – Senior; 42 – Abe Chancellor – (redshirt) Junior; 43 – Alex Petrovic – Sophomore; 46 – Saxon Roberts – Freshman; 48 – Clinton Harris – Freshman | Catchers: 6 – Cale Stricklin – Sophomore; 10 – Lucas Steele – Junior; 18 – Ike Irish – Junior; 44 – Chase Fralick – Freshman; Infielders: 1 – Eric Snow – Junior; 2 – Chris Rembert – Freshman; 4 – Andrew Dutton – Graduate Student; 7 – Deric Fabian – Senior; 8 – Eric Guevara – Sophomore; 12 – Addison Klepsch – Freshman; 26 – Cooper McMurray – (redshirt) Senior; 50 – Brandon McCraine – Freshman; 52 – Tanner Waldrop – Freshman | Outfielders: 5 – Bristol Carter – Sophomore; 14 – Cade Belyeu – Sophomore; 16 – Cole Edwards – Sophomore; 19 – Bub Terrell – Freshman |

=== Coaching staff ===
2025 Auburn Tigers coaching staff
| Name | Position |
|---|---|
| Butch Thompson | Head coach |
| Karl Nonemaker | Associate Head Coach |
| Gabe Gross | Associate Head Coach |
| Everett Teaford | Pitching Coach |

== Schedule and results ==
2025 Auburn Tigers baseball game log (41–20)
Regular season (38–17)

February (9–1)
| Date | Opponent | Rank | Site/stadium | Score | Win | Loss | Save | TV | Attendance | Overall record | SEC record |
|---|---|---|---|---|---|---|---|---|---|---|---|
| February 14 | Holy Cross* | | Plainsman Park | **W** 4–1 | **Tilly** (1–0) | Macchiarola (0–1) | None | SECN+ | 5,718 | 1–0 | – |
| February 15 | Holy Cross* | | Plainsman Park | **L** 2–4 | Volz (1–0) | **Dutton** (0–1) | Leon (1) | SECN+ | 4,821 | 1–1 | – |
| February 16 | Holy Cross* | | Plainsman Park | **W** 14–6 | **Watts** (1–0) | Nesson (0–1) | None | SECN+ | 4,761 | 2–1 | – |
| February 18 | No. 24 Troy* | | Plainsman Park | **W** 7–6 | **Johnson** (1–0) | Lyon (1–1) | None | SECN+ | 4,940 | 3–1 | – |
| February 19 | North Alabama* | | Plainsman Park | **W** 6–2 | **Graves** (1–0) | Scruggs (0–1) | **Carlson** (1) | SECN+ | 4,161 | 4–1 | – |
| February 21 | Wright State* | | Plainsman Park | **W** 11–0^{7} | **Dutton** (1–1) | Paige (0–1) | None | SECN+ | 4,380 | 5–1 | – |
| February 22 | Wright State* | | Plainsman Park | **W** 11–1^{7} | **Sanders** (1–0) | Heilman (0–1) | None | SECN+ | 4,652 | 6–1 | – |
| February 23 | Wright State* | | Plainsman Park | **W** 9–4 | **Johnston** (2–0) | Lax (0–1) | None | SECN+ | 4,277 | 7–1 | – |
| February 25 | Samford* | | Plainsman Park | **W** 15–8 | **Carlson** (1–0) | Horowicz (0–1) | None | SECN+ | 5,262 | 8–1 | – |
Amegy Bank College Baseball Series
| February 28 | Ohio State* | | Globe Life Field; Arlington, TX | **W** 13–0^{7} | **Dutton** (2–1) | Erdmann (0–1) | None | FloCollege | | 9–1 | – |

March (11–7)
| Date | Opponent | Rank | Site/stadium | Score | Win | Loss | Save | TV | Attendance | Overall record | SEC record |
|---|---|---|---|---|---|---|---|---|---|---|---|
| March 1 | No. 9 Oregon State* | | Globe Life Field | **W** 8–7 | **Tilly** (2–0) | Whitney (1–2) | **Johnson** (1) | FloCollege | 5,433 | 10–1 | – |
| March 2 | Baylor* | | Globe Life Field | **W** 7–4 | **Chatterton** (1–0) | Stasio (1–1) | None | FloCollege | 2,258 | 11–1 | – |
| March 5 | at UAB* | No. 22 | Regions Field; Birmingham, AL | **L** 5–6 | Olson (2–0) | **Carlson** (1–1) | None | ESPN+ | 2,752 | 11–2 | – |
| March 7 | Old Dominion* | No. 22 | Plainsman Park | **W** 10–4 | **Armstrong** (1–0) | Moore (0–1) | None | SECN+ | 4,956 | 12–2 | – |
| March 8 | Old Dominion* | No. 22 | Plainsman Park | **L** 9–11 | Levari (1–1) | **Graves** (1–1) | Davis (1) | SECN+ | 4,779 | 12–3 | – |
| March 9 | Old Dominion* | No. 22 | Plainsman Park | **W** 7–3 | **Chatterton** (2–0) | Morgan (1–1) | **Myers** (1) | SECN+ | 4,320 | 13–3 | – |
| March 11 | UT Martin* | No. 25 | Toyota Field; Madison, AL | **W** 6–1 | **Petrovic** (1–0) | Wager (1–2) | None | TBA | 5,207 | 14–3 | – |
| March 14 | No. 16 Vanderbilt | No. 25 | Plainsman Park | **W** 6–2 | **Dutton** (3–1) | Thompson (2–1) | None | SECN+ | 4,780 | 15–3 | 1–0 |
| March 15 | No. 16 Vanderbilt | No. 25 | Plainsman Park | **L** 6–8 | Hawks (3–0) | **Tilly** (2–1) | Green (4) | SECN+ | 4,669 | 15–4 | 1–1 |
| March 16 | No. 16 Vanderbilt | No. 25 | Plainsman Park | **W** 7–6 | **Alvarez** (1–0) | Green (0–1) | **Hetzler** (1) | SECN+ | 4,799 | 16–4 | 2–1 |
| March 18 | Alabama State* | No. 20 | Plainsman Park | **W** 13–9 | **Johnston** (3–0) | Christensen (1–2) | **Myers** (2) | SECN+ | 4,694 | 17–4 | – |
| March 21 | at Kentucky | No. 20 | Kentucky Proud Park; Lexington, KY | **W** 8–7 | **Carlson** (2–1) | Gregersen (0–2) | **Hetzler** (2) | SECN+ | 3,226 | 18–4 | 3–1 |
| March 22 | at Kentucky | No. 20 | Kentucky Proud Park; Lexington, KY | **W** 8–7^{11} | **Carlson** (3–1) | Hentschel (0–1) | None | SECN+ | 3,416 | 19–4 | 4–1 |
| March 23 | at Kentucky | No. 20 | Kentucky Proud Park | **L** 0–6 | Byers (2–0) | **Chatterton** (0–1) | Skelding (1) | SECN | 2,700 | 19–5 | 4–2 |
| March 25 | vs. South Alabama* | No. 11 | Riverwalk Stadium; Montgomery, AL | **W** 13–5 | **Johnston** (4–0) | Smith (2–1) | None | TBA | 2,083 | 20–5 | – |
| March 28 | at No. 3 Georgia | No. 11 | Foley Field; Athens, GA | **L** 1–4 | Smith (2–0) | **Dutton** (3–2) | Radtke (2) | SECN+ | 3,633 | 20–6 | 4–3 |
| March 29 (DH 1) | at No. 3 Georgia | No. 11 | Foley Field | **L** 7–11 | McLoughlin (4–0) | **Armstrong** (1–1) | Quinn (1) | SECN+ | 2,774 | 20–7 | 4–4 |
| March 29 (DH 2) | at No. 3 Georgia | No. 11 | Foley Field | **L** 6–9^{10} | Radtke (4–0) | **Murphy** (0–1) | None | SECN | 3,633 | 20–8 | 4–5 |

April (11–6)
| Date | Opponent | Rank | Site/stadium | Score | Win | Loss | Save | TV | Attendance | Overall record | SEC record |
|---|---|---|---|---|---|---|---|---|---|---|---|
| April 1 | UAB* | No. 16 | Plainsman Park | **L** 2–4 | Hill (1–0) | **Sanders** (1–1) | Olson (5) | SECN+ | 5,094 | 20–9 | – |
| April 4 | No. 8 Alabama | No. 16 | Plainsman Park | **W** 10–0^{7} | **Dutton** (4–2) | Adams (4–1) | None | SECN+ | 6,729 | 21–9 | 5–5 |
| April 5 | No. 8 Alabama | No. 16 | Plainsman Park | **L** 5–6 | Morris (2–0) | **Myers** (0–1) | Ozmer (9) | SECN | | 21–10 | 5–6 |
| April 6 | No. 8 Alabama | No. 16 | Plainsman Park | **W** 7–5 | **Graves** (2–1) | Alcock (3–2) | **Hetzler** (3) | TBA | 5,603 | 22–10 | 6–6 |
| April 8 | at No. 18 Georgia Tech* | No. 11 | Russ Chandler Stadium; Atlanta, GA | **W** 9–8 | **Watts** (2–0) | Lankie (0–1) | None | ACCNX | 3,486 | 23–10 | – |
| April 11 | No. 3 LSU | No. 11 | Plainsman Park | **W** 8–4 | **Dutton** (5–2) | Anderson (6–1) | None | SECN+ | 6,756 | 24–10 | 7–6 |
| April 12 | No. 3 LSU | No. 11 | Plainsman Park | **W** 4–2 | **Fisher** (1–0) | Eyanson (5–1) | **Hetzler** (4) | SECN+ | 7,231 | 25–10 | 8–6 |
| April 13 | No. 3 LSU | No. 11 | Plainsman Park | **W** 3–2 | **Graves** (3–1) | Shores (5–2) | **Watts (1)** | SECN+ | 5,132 | 26–10 | 9–6 |
| April 15 | at Jacksonville State* | No. 8 | Rudy Abbott Field; Jacksonville, AL | **W** 4–3 | **Schorr** (1–0) | Sleeper (2–1) | None | TBA | 1,588 | 27–10 | – |
| April 17 | at No. 1 Texas | No. 8 | UFCU Disch-Falk Field; Austin, TX | **L** 2–3 | Grubbs (6–0) | **Myers** (0–2) | Volantis (9) | SECN+ | 7,211 | 27–11 | 9–7 |
| April 18 | at No. 1 Texas | No. 8 | UFCU Disch-Falk Field | **L** 3–8 | Harrison (3–0) | **Fisher** (1–1) | None | SECN+ | 7,290 | 27–12 | 9–8 |
| April 19 | at No. 1 Texas | No. 8 | UFCU Disch-Falk Field | **L** 2–14^{7} | Flores (4–1) | **Alvarez** (1–1) | None | SECN+ | 7,328 | 27–13 | 9–9 |
| April 22 | No. 24 Georgia Tech* | No. 11 | Plainsman Park | **W** 1–0 | **Armstrong** (2–1) | Paden (4–1) | **Tilly** (1) | SECN | 5,559 | 28–13 | – |
| April 25 | Mississippi State | No. 11 | Plainsman Park | **W** 6–5 | **Myers** (1–2) | Kohn (4–2) | **Hetzler** (5) | SECN+ | 5,866 | 29–13 | 10–9 |
| April 26 | Mississippi State | No. 11 | Plainsman Park | **L** 7–12 | Siary (1–1) | **Fisher** (1–2) | None | SECN+ | 6,484 | 29–14 | 10–10 |
| April 27 | Mississippi State | No. 11 | Plainsman Park | **W** 14–8 | **Myers** (2–2) | Ligon (4–5) | None | SECN+ | 5,329 | 30–14 | 11–10 |
| April 29 | Samford* | No. 10 | Hoover Met; Hoover, AL | **W** 3–0 | **Chatterton** (3–1) | Clevenger (1–1) | **Hetzler** (6) | TBA | 2,531 | 31–14 | – |

May (7–2)
| Date | Opponent | Rank | Site/stadium | Score | Win | Loss | Save | TV | Attendance | Overall record | SEC record |
|---|---|---|---|---|---|---|---|---|---|---|---|
| May 2 | at No. 12 Tennessee | No. 10 | Lindsey Nelson Stadium; Knoxville, TN | **W** 6–1 | **Dutton** (6–2) | Doyle (7–2) | **Hetzler** (7) | SECN+ | 5,406 | 32–14 | 12–10 |
| May 3 | at No. 12 Tennessee | No. 10 | Lindsey Nelson Stadium | **L** 4–5^{11} | Doyle (8–2) | **Watts** (2–1) | None | SECN+ | 5,406 | 32–15 | 12–11 |
| May 4 | at No. 12 Tennessee | No. 10 | Lindsey Nelson Stadium | **W** 8–1^{7} | **Chatterton** (4–1) | Russell (0–1) | **Fisher** (1) | SECN+ | 6,041 | 33–15 | 13–11 |
| May 8 | South Carolina | No. 8 | Plainsman Park | **W** 24–2^{7} | **Tilly** (3–1) | Stone (2–6) | None | ESPNU | 4,974 | 34–15 | 14–11 |
| May 9 (DH 1) | South Carolina | No. 8 | Plainsman Park | **W** 11–10 | **Hetzler** (1–0) | Crowther (2–2) | None | SECN+ | 6,196 | 35–15 | 15–11 |
| May 9 (DH 2) | South Carolina | No. 8 | Plainsman Park | **W** 11–3 | **Griffin** (4–1) | Eskew (0–3) | **Watts** (2) | SECN | 6,196 | 36–15 | 16–11 |
| May 13 | Jacksonville State* | No. 6 | Plainsman Park | **W** 19–1^{7} | **Alvarez** (2–1) | Bonaparte (3–3) | None | SECN+ | 5,076 | 37–15 | – |
| May 15 | at Ole Miss | No. 6 | Swayze Field; Oxford, MS | **L** 2–9 | Elliott (8–3) | **Tilly** (3–2) | None | SECN+ | 8,947 | 37–16 | 16–12 |
| May 16 | at Ole Miss | No. 6 | Swayze Field | **L** 11–15 | Morris (5–1) | **Dutton** (6–3) | None | SEC Network | 9,036 | 37–17 | 16–13 |
| May 17 | at Ole Miss | No. 6 | Swayze Field | **W** 13–8 | **Hetzler** (2–0) | Rodriguez (0–1) | None | SECN+ | 9,153 | 38–17 | 17–13 |

Postseason (3–3)

SEC Tournament (0–1)
| Date | Opponent | Seed | Site/stadium | Score | Win | Loss | Save | TV | Attendance | Overall record | SECT Record |
|---|---|---|---|---|---|---|---|---|---|---|---|
| May 22 | vs. (14) Texas A&M | (6) No. 8 | Hoover Metropolitan Stadium; Hoover, AL | **L** 2–3 | Lamkin (5-7) | **Tilly** (3-3) | Freshcorn (1) | SECN | 9,812 | 38–18 | 0–1 |

Auburn Regional (3–0)
| Date | Opponent | Seed | Site/stadium | Score | Win | Loss | Save | TV | Attendance | Overall record | NCAA Record |
|---|---|---|---|---|---|---|---|---|---|---|---|
| May 30 | (4) Central Connecticut | (1) No. 9 | Plainsman Park; Auburn, AL | **W** 9–5 | **Myers** (3–2) | Munn (8–3) | None | ESPN+ | 7,367 | 39–18 | 1–0 |
| May 31 | (3) Stetson | (1) No. 9 | Plainsman Park; Auburn, AL | **W** 8–5 | **Dutton** (7–3) | Hays (4–1) | **Hetzler** (8) | ESPN+ | 7,434 | 40–18 | 2–0 |
| June 1 | (2) NC State | (1) No. 9 | Plainsman Park; Auburn, AL | **W** 11–1 | **Alvarez** (3–1) | Fritton (5–6) | **Fisher** (2) | ESPN+ | 7,373 | 41–18 | 3–0 |

Auburn Super Regional (0–2)
| Date | Opponent | Seed | Site/stadium | Score | Win | Loss | Save | TV | Attendance | Overall record | NCAA Record |
|---|---|---|---|---|---|---|---|---|---|---|---|
| June 7 | vs. No. 11 (1) Coastal Carolina | (1) No. 9 | Plainsman Park; Auburn, AL | **L** 6–7^{10} | Potok (4–1) | **Hetzler** (2–1) | Lynch (8) | ESPN+ | 7,891 | 41–19 | 3–1 |
| June 8 | vs. No. 11 (1) Coastal Carolina | (1) No. 9 | Plainsman Park | **L** 1–4 | Johnson (5–0) | **Fisher** (1–3) | None | ESPN+ | 7,841 | 41–20 | 3–2 |

Legend: = Win = Loss = Canceled
Bold = Auburn team member
Rankings are based on the team's current ranking in the D1Baseball poll.
*Denotes non-conference game

Schedule source:

== Record vs. conference opponents ==
Blank are not scheduled. Blue are home games, otherwise away.

2025 SEC baseball records Source: 2025 SEC baseball game results, 2025 SEC baseball schedule
| Tm | W–L | ALA | ARK | AUB | FLA | UGA | KEN | LSU | MSU | MIZ | OKL | OMS | SCA | TEN | TEX | TAM | VAN | Tm | SR | SW |
|---|---|---|---|---|---|---|---|---|---|---|---|---|---|---|---|---|---|---|---|---|
| ALA | 16–14 | | . | 1–2 | 1–2 | 2–1 | . | 1–2 | 1–2 | 3–0 | 2–1 | . | . | 1–2 | . | 3–0 | 1–2 | ALA | 4–6 | 2–0 |
| ARK | 20–10 | . | | . | 1–2 | 1–2 | . | 1–2 | . | 3–0 | . | 2–1 | 3–0 | 2–1 | 3–0 | 1–2 | 3–0 | ARK | 6–4 | 4–0 |
| AUB | 17–13 | 2–1 | . | | . | 0–3 | 2–1 | 3–0 | 2–1 | . | . | 1–2 | 3–0 | 2–1 | 0–3 | . | 2–1 | AUB | 7–3 | 2–2 |
| FLA | 15–15 | 2–1 | 2–1 | . | | 0–3 | . | . | 2–1 | 3–0 | . | 1–2 | 3–0 | 0–3 | 2–1 | . | 0–3 | FLA | 6–4 | 2–3 |
| UGA | 18–12 | 1–2 | 2–1 | 3–0 | 3–0 | | 2–1 | . | . | 3–0 | 2–1 | . | . | . | 0–3 | 2–1 | 0–3 | UGA | 7–3 | 3–2 |
| KEN | 13–17 | . | . | 1–2 | . | 1–2 | | . | 0–3 | . | 3–0 | 1–2 | 2–1 | 2–1 | 1–2 | 2–1 | 0–3 | KEN | 4–6 | 1–2 |
| LSU | 19–11 | 2–1 | 2–1 | 0–3 | . | . | . | | 3–0 | 3–0 | 3–0 | . | 2–1 | 2–1 | 1–2 | 1–2 | . | LSU | 7–3 | 3–1 |
| MSU | 15–15 | 2–1 | . | 1–2 | 1–2 | . | 3–0 | 0–3 | | 3–0 | 1–2 | 2–1 | 2–1 | . | 0–3 | . | . | MSU | 5–5 | 2–2 |
| MIZ | 3–27 | 0–3 | 0–3 | . | 0–3 | 0–3 | . | 0–3 | 0–3 | | 0–3 | 0–3 | . | . | 0–3 | 3–0 | . | MIZ | 1–9 | 1–9 |
| OKL | 14–16 | 1–2 | . | . | . | 1–2 | 0–3 | 0–3 | 2–1 | 3–0 | | 2–1 | 2–1 | . | 1–2 | . | 2–1 | OKL | 5–5 | 1–2 |
| OMS | 16–14 | . | 1–2 | 2–1 | 2–1 | . | 2–1 | . | 1–2 | 3–0 | 1–2 | | 1–2 | 1–2 | . | . | 2–1 | OMS | 5–5 | 1–0 |
| SCA | 6–24 | . | 0–3 | 0–3 | 0–3 | . | 1–2 | 1–2 | 1–2 | . | 1–2 | 2–1 | | 0–3 | . | 0–3 | . | SCA | 1–9 | 0–5 |
| TEN | 16–14 | 2–1 | 1–2 | 1–2 | 3–0 | . | 1–2 | 1–2 | . | . | . | 2–1 | 3–0 | | . | 1–2 | 1–2 | TEN | 4–6 | 2–0 |
| TEX | 22–8 | . | 0–3 | 3–0 | 1–2 | 3–0 | 2–1 | 2–1 | 3–0 | 3–0 | 2–1 | . | . | . | | 3–0 | . | TEX | 8–2 | 5–1 |
| TAM | 11–19 | 0–3 | 2–1 | . | . | 1–2 | 1–2 | 2–1 | . | 0–3 | . | . | 3–0 | 2–1 | 0–3 | | 0–3 | TAM | 4–6 | 1–4 |
| VAN | 19–11 | 2–1 | 0–3 | 1–2 | 3–0 | 3–0 | 3–0 | . | . | . | 1–2 | 1–2 | . | 2–1 | . | 3–0 | | VAN | 6–4 | 4–1 |
| Tm | W–L | ALA | ARK | AUB | FLA | UGA | KEN | LSU | MSU | MIZ | OKL | OMS | SCA | TEN | TEX | TAM | VAN | Team | SR | SW |

Updated for entire regular season.
Tie brkrs: LSU>VAN ARK common, OMS>TEN & OMS>ALA VAN common, TEN>ALA hd to hd, FLA>MSU hd to hd.

== Rankings ==
Ranking movements Legend: ██ Increase in ranking ██ Decrease in ranking — = Not ranked RV = Received votes
| | Week | | | | | | | | | | | | | | | | | | |
| Poll | Pre | 1 | 2 | 3 | 4 | 5 | 6 | 7 | 8 | 9 | 10 | 11 | 12 | 13 | 14 | 15 | 16 | 17 | Final |
|---|---|---|---|---|---|---|---|---|---|---|---|---|---|---|---|---|---|---|---|
| Coaches' | RV | RV* | RV | 20 | 23 | 16 | 12 | 17 | 12 | 9 | 11 | 11 | 8 | 6 | 10 | 10 | | | |
| Baseball America | — | — | — | — | — | 17 | 12 | 15 | 9 | 7 | 12 | 5 | 5 | 2 | 7 | 7* | | | |
| Collegiate Baseball^ | — | — | — | — | — | — | — | — | — | — | — | — | — | — | — | — | | | |
| NCBWA† | RV | RV | RV | RV | 25 | 25 | 16 | 21 | 16 | 9 | 11 | 11 | 12 | 8 | 10 | 12 | | | |
| D1Baseball | — | — | — | 22 | 25 | 20 | 11 | 16 | 11 | 8 | 11 | 10 | 8 | 6 | 8 | 9 | | | |
| Perfect Game | 22 | 25 | 25 | 20 | 24 | 18 | 11 | 14 | 12 | 6 | 12 | 5 | 8 | 2 | 10 | 10* | | | |

^ Collegiate Baseball ranked 40 teams in their preseason poll, but only ranked 30 teams weekly during the season.
† NCBWA ranks 30 teams in their preseason poll, but only ranks 25 teams weekly during the season.
* A new poll was not released for this week, so for comparison purposes, the previous week's ranking is inserted in this week's slot.
