= 2025 South Carolina Gamecocks baseball team =

American college baseball season

2025 South Carolina Gamecocks baseball
- Conference: Southeastern Conference
- Record: 28–29 (6–24 SEC)
- Head coach: Paul Mainieri (1st season)
- Assistant coaches: Monte Lee; Terry Rooney; John Hendry
- Home stadium: Founders Park

2025 Southeastern Conference baseball standings
| | Conf. | | | | Overall |
| Team | W | | L | PCT | W | | L | PCT |
|---|---|---|---|---|---|---|---|---|
| No. 17 Texas ‍†‍‍^{y} | 22 | – | 8 | .733 | 44 | – | 14 | .759 |
| No. 3 Arkansas ‍‍‍^{y} | 20 | – | 10 | .667 | 50 | – | 15 | .769 |
| No. 1 LSU ‍‍‍^{y} | 19 | – | 11 | .633 | 53 | – | 15 | .779 |
| No. 18 Vanderbilt ‍‍‡‍^{y} | 19 | – | 11 | .633 | 43 | – | 18 | .705 |
| No. 19 Georgia ‍‍‍^{y} | 18 | – | 12 | .600 | 43 | – | 17 | .717 |
| No. 11 Auburn ‍‍‍^{y} | 17 | – | 13 | .567 | 41 | – | 20 | .672 |
| No. 21 Ole Miss ‍‍‍^{y} | 16 | – | 14 | .533 | 43 | – | 21 | .672 |
| No. 12 Tennessee ‍‍‍^{y} | 16 | – | 14 | .533 | 46 | – | 19 | .708 |
| Alabama ‍‍‍^{y} | 16 | – | 14 | .533 | 41 | – | 18 | .695 |
| Florida ‍‍‍^{y} | 15 | – | 15 | .500 | 39 | – | 22 | .639 |
| Mississippi State ‍‍‍^{y} | 15 | – | 15 | .500 | 36 | – | 23 | .610 |
| Oklahoma ‍‍‍^{y} | 14 | – | 16 | .467 | 38 | – | 22 | .633 |
| Kentucky ‍‍‍^{y} | 13 | – | 17 | .433 | 31 | – | 26 | .544 |
| Texas A&M ‍‍‍ | 11 | – | 19 | .367 | 30 | – | 26 | .536 |
| South Carolina ‍‍‍ | 6 | – | 24 | .200 | 28 | – | 29 | .491 |
| Missouri ‍‍‍ | 3 | – | 27 | .100 | 16 | – | 39 | .291 |
† – Conference champion ‡ – Tournament champion y – Invited to the NCAA Tournament; As of June 22, 2025; Rankings from D1Baseball

The 2025 South Carolina Gamecocks baseball team represents the University of South Carolina in the 2025 NCAA Division I baseball season. The Gamecocks play their home games at Founders Park.

== Schedule and results ==
2025 South Carolina Gamecocks baseball game log (28–28)
Regular season (28–28)

February (9–1)
| Date | Opponent | Rank | Site/stadium | Score | Win | Loss | Save | TV | Attendance | Overall record | SEC record |
|---|---|---|---|---|---|---|---|---|---|---|---|
| February 14 | Sacred Heart | | Founders Park; Columbia, South Carolina | **W** 5–3 | **Marlatt** (1–0) | Stallone (0–1) | **Sweeney** (1) | SECN+ | 7,641 | 1–0 | — |
| February 15 | Sacred Heart | | Founders Park | **W** 14–0 (7) | **Becker** (1–0) | Foster (0–1) | | SECN+ | 8,242 | 2–0 | — |
| February 16 | Sacred Heart | | Founders Park | **W** 8–0 | **McCoy** (1–0) | Parker (0–1) | | SECN+ | 6,612 | 3–0 | — |
| February 18 | at Winthrop | | Winthrop Ballpark; Rock Hill, South Carolina | **W** 5–3 | **Stone** (1–0) | Gilley (0–1) | **Sweeney** (2) | ESPN+ | 1,697 | 4–0 | — |
| February 19 | Queens | | Founders Park | **W** 7–2 | **Garino** (1–0) | Ruller (0–1) | | SECN+ | 6,321 | 5–0 | — |
| February 21 | Milwaukee | | Founders Park | **W** 5–2 | **Pitzer** (1–0) | Theis (1–1) | **Sweeney** (3) | SECN+ | 6,825 | 6–0 | — |
| February 22 | Milwaukee | | Founders Park | **W** 6–3 | **Becker** (2–0) | Schulfer (0–2) | **Stone** (1) | SECN+ | 7,735 | 7–0 | — |
| February 23 | Milwaukee | | Founders Park | **W** 14–4 (8) | **Crowther** (1–0) | Sullivan (0–1) | | SECN+ | 7,012 | 8–0 | — |
| February 25 | Gardner–Webb | | Founders Park | **W** 14–4 (7) | **Evans Jr.** (1–0) | Manriquez (0–1) | | SECN+ | 7,156 | 9–0 | — |
| February 28 | at No. 13 Clemson | | Doug Kingsmore Stadium; Clemson, South Carolina | **L** 3–5 | McGovern (1–0) | **Becker** (2–1) | Mahlstedt (3) | ACCNX | 6,891 | 9–1 | — |

March (8–11)
| Date | Opponent | Rank | Site/stadium | Score | Win | Loss | Save | TV | Attendance | Overall record | SEC record |
|---|---|---|---|---|---|---|---|---|---|---|---|
| March 1 | vs. No. 13 Clemson | | Fluor Field at the West End; Greenville, South Carolina | **L** 1–5 | Darden (2–0) | **McCoy** (1–1) | Titsworth (2) | SECN+ | 6,983 | 9–2 | — |
| March 2 | No. 13 Clemson | | Founders Park | **L** 2–8 | Allen (2–0) | **Eskew** (0–1) | | SECN+ | 8,242 | 9–3 | — |
| March 4 | Davidson | | Founders Park | **W** 7–3 | **Pitzer** (2–0) | Katz (0–1) | | SECN+ | 6,612 | 10–3 | — |
| March 5 | at The Citadel | | Joseph P. Riley Jr. Park; Charleston, South Carolina | **W** 9–1 | **Evans Jr.** (2–0) | Paulsen (0–1) | | ESPN+ | 4,937 | 11–3 | — |
| March 7 | Morehead State | | Founders Park | **W** 11–7 | **Pitzer** (3–0) | Grimmett (2–1) | | SECN+ | 6,522 | 12–3 | — |
| March 8 | Morehead State | | Founders Park | **W** 16–11 | **Russell** (1–0) | Hawks (0–2) | | SECN+ | 6,753 | 13–3 | — |
| March 9 | Morehead State | | Founders Park | **W** 1–0 | **Soucie** (1–0) | Poynter (2–1) | **Sweeney** (4) | SECN+ | 6,267 | 14–3 | — |
| March 12 | Georgia State | | Founders Park | **W** 7–1 | **Evans Jr.** (3–0) | Matela (0–1) | | SECN+ | 6,435 | 15–3 | — |
| March 14 | No. 12 Oklahoma | | Founders Park | **L** 5–8 | K. Witherspoon (5–0) | **Stone** (1–1) | Crooks (6) | SECN+ | 7,264 | 15–4 | 0–1 |
| March 15 | No. 12 Oklahoma | | Founders Park | **W** 11–5 | **McCoy** (2–1) | M. Witherspoon (2–1) | **Pitzer** (1) | SECN+ | 7,140 | 16–4 | 1–1 |
| March 16 | No. 12 Oklahoma | | Founders Park | **L** 5–6 (10) | Crooks (1–0) | **Sweeney** (0–1) | | SECN+ | 7,245 | 16–5 | 1–2 |
| March 18 | vs. Charleston | | Segra Park; Columbia, South Carolina | **W** 4–3 | **Garino** (2–0) | Eggert (1–1) | **Marlatt** (1) | SECN+ | 2,610 | 17–5 | — |
| March 21 | at No. 3 Arkansas | | Baum–Walker Stadium; Fayetteville, Arkansas | **L** 2–12 (7) | Root (3–1) | **Stone** (1–2) | | SECN+ | 10,023 | 17–6 | 1–3 |
| March 22 | at No. 3 Arkansas | | Baum–Walker Stadium | **L** 3–12 | Jimenez (2–0) | **McCoy** (2–2) | McEntire (1) | SECN+ | 9,759 | 17–7 | 1–4 |
| March 23 | at No. 3 Arkansas | | Baum–Walker Stadium | **L** 4–11 | Coil (2–0) | **Sweeney** (0–2) | | SECN+ | 9,367 | 17–8 | 1–5 |
| March 25 | vs. No. 21 North Carolina | | Truist Field; Charlotte, North Carolina | **L** 8–13 | Lynch (2–0) | **Russell** (1–1) | | SECN+ | 4,871 | 17–9 | — |
| March 28 | No. 1 Tennessee | | Founders Park | **L** 7–11 | Doyle (4–1) | **McCoy** (2–3) | | SECN+ | 8,242 | 17–10 | 1–6 |
| March 29 | No. 1 Tennessee | | Founders Park | **L** 5–7 | Snead (2–0) | **Stone** (1–3) | | SECN+ | 8,242 | 17–11 | 1–7 |
| March 30 | No. 1 Tennessee | | Founders Park | **L** 2–7 | Krenzel (2–0) | **Becker** (2–2) | | SECN+ | 8,012 | 17–12 | 1–8 |

April (9–8)
| Date | Opponent | Rank | Site/stadium | Score | Win | Loss | Save | TV | Attendance | Overall record | SEC record |
|---|---|---|---|---|---|---|---|---|---|---|---|
| April 1 | Presbyterian | | Founders Park | **W** 11–1 (7) | **Soucie** (2–0) | Saint (1–2) | | SEC Network | 6,912 | 18–12 | — |
| April 4 | at Mississippi State | | Dudy Noble Field, Polk–DeMent Stadium; Starkville, Mississippi | **W** 7–3 | **McCoy** (3–3) | Davis (1–2) | **Sweeney** (5) | SECN+ | 11,983 | 19–12 | 2–8 |
| April 5 | at Mississippi State | | Dudy Noble Field, Polk–DeMent Stadium | **L** 4–11 | Hungate (2–1) | **Evans Jr.** (3–1) | | SECN+ | 12,132 | 19–13 | 2–9 |
| April 6 | at Mississippi State | | Dudy Noble Field, Polk–DeMent Stadium | **L** 0–6 | Ligon (3–4) | **Stone** (1–4) | Simmons (2) | SECN+ | 9,943 | 19–14 | 2–10 |
| April 8 | USC Upstate | | Founders Park | **W** 13–3 (7) | **Soucie** (3–0) | Sanderson (1–2) | | SECN+ | 6,628 | 20–14 | — |
| April 10 | at Texas A&M | | Olsen Field at Blue Bell Park; College Station, Texas | **L** 7–8 (10) | Moss (4–2) | **Sweeney** (0–3) | | ESPNU | 5,927 | 20–15 | 2–11 |
| April 11 | at Texas A&M | | Olsen Field at Blue Bell Park | **L** 0–17 (7) | Lamkin (3–3) | **Becker** (2–3) | | SECN+ | 6,768 | 20–16 | 2–12 |
| April 12 | at Texas A&M | | Olsen Field at Blue Bell Park | **L** 12–15 | McCoy (2–1) | **C. Jones** (0–1) | | SECN+ | 7,457 | 20–17 | 2–13 |
| April 15 | The Citadel | | Founders Park | **W** 4–0 | **Pitzer** (4–0) | Cummiskey (0–1) | | SECN+ | 7,214 | 21–17 | — |
| April 17 | No. 11 Ole Miss | | Founders Park | **W** 3–2 | **Stone** (2–4) | Elliott (5–2) | | SECN+ | 7,523 | 22–17 | 3–13 |
| April 18 | No. 11 Ole Miss | | Founders Park | **W** 7–2 | **McCoy** (4–3) | Maddox (4–3) | **Crowther** (1) | SECN+ | 7,256 | 23–17 | 4–13 |
| April 19 | No. 11 Ole Miss | | Founders Park | **L** 2–12 (7) | Nichols (3–0) | **Evans Jr.** (3–2) | | SECN+ | 7,720 | 23–18 | 4–14 |
| April 22 | North Florida | | Founders Park | **W** 3–2 (10) | **Sweeney** (1–3) | Adams (0–2) | | SECN+ | 6,727 | 24–18 | — |
| April 25 | at Kentucky | | Kentucky Proud Park; Lexington, Kentucky | **L** 3–7 | Harris (4–2) | **Stone** (2–5) | | SECN+ | 4,134 | 24–19 | 4–15 |
| April 26 | at Kentucky | | Kentucky Proud Park | **W** 5–4 | **Crowther** (2–0) | Hentschel (2–3) | | SECN+ | 4,134 | 25–19 | 5–15 |
| April 27 | at Kentucky | | Kentucky Proud Park | **L** 5–11 | Cleaver (5–2) | **Eskew** (0–2) | | SECN+ | 4,292 | 25–20 | 5–16 |
| April 29 | Charleston Southern | | Founders Park | **W** 5–3 | **Evans Jr.** (4–2) | Grindlinger (0–1) | **Sweeney** (1) | SECN+ | 6,842 | 26–20 | — |

May (2–8)
| Date | Opponent | Rank | Site/stadium | Score | Win | Loss | Save | TV | Attendance | Overall record | SEC record |
|---|---|---|---|---|---|---|---|---|---|---|---|
| May 2 | Florida | | Founders Park | **L** 5–9 | McDonald (4–0) | **Soucie** (3–1) | Clemente (6) | SECN+ | 7,616 | 26–21 | 5–17 |
| May 3 | Florida | | Founders Park | **L** 3–22^{[d]} | Peterson (8–2) | **McCoy** (4–4) | None | SECN+ | 7,752 | 26–22 | 5–18 |
| May 4 | Florida | | Founders Park | **L** 0–8 (7) | Barberi (2–1) | **Crowther** (2–1) | Rodriguez (1) | SECN+ | 7,151 | 26–23 | 5–19 |
| May 8 | at No. 8 Auburn | | Plainsman Park; Auburn, Alabama | **L** 2–24 (7) | Tilly (3–1) | **Stone** (2–6) | None | ESPNU | 4,974 | 26–24 | 5–20 |
| May 9 (DH 1) | at No. 8 Auburn | | Plainsman Park | **L** 10–11 | Hetzler (1–0) | **Crowther** (2–2) | None | SECN+ | 6,196 | 26–25 | 5–21 |
| May 9 (DH 2) | at No. 8 Auburn | | Plainsman Park | **L** 3–11 | Griffin (4–1) | **Eskew** (0–3) | None | SEC Network | 6,196 | 26–26 | 5–22 |
| May 13 | Winthrop | | Founders Park | **W** 6–5 | **Russell** (2–3) | Hall (1–3) | **Marlatt** (2) | SECN+ | 6,342 | 27–26 | — |
| May 15 | No. 1 LSU | | Founders Park | **W** 6–5 | **Becker** (3–3) | Cowan (3–3) | None | SEC Network | 6,841 | 28–26 | 6–22 |
| May 16 | No. 1 LSU | | Founders Park | **L** 1–8 | Anderson (7–1) | **McCoy** (4–5) | None | SECN+ | 7,225 | 28–27 | 6–23 |
| May 17 | No. 1 LSU | | Founders Park | **L** 3–7 | Eyanson (9–2) | **Eskew** (0–4) | None | SECN+ | 7,145 | 28–28 | 6–24 |
^{^[d]}The game was suspended during the third inning due to inclement weather with Florida leading 1–0 and continued at 1:30 p.m. on May 4 prior to the start of the game scheduled for that day, which was a 7-inning game.

- Win
- Loss
- Postponement
- Bold: South Carolina player
- Rankings from D1Baseball.com.
- (#) Tournament seedings in parentheses.

== Record vs. conference opponents ==
Blank are not scheduled. Blue are home games, otherwise away.

2025 SEC baseball records Source: 2025 SEC baseball game results, 2025 SEC baseball schedule
| Tm | W–L | ALA | ARK | AUB | FLA | UGA | KEN | LSU | MSU | MIZ | OKL | OMS | SCA | TEN | TEX | TAM | VAN | Tm | SR | SW |
|---|---|---|---|---|---|---|---|---|---|---|---|---|---|---|---|---|---|---|---|---|
| ALA | 16–14 | | . | 1–2 | 1–2 | 2–1 | . | 1–2 | 1–2 | 3–0 | 2–1 | . | . | 1–2 | . | 3–0 | 1–2 | ALA | 4–6 | 2–0 |
| ARK | 20–10 | . | | . | 1–2 | 1–2 | . | 1–2 | . | 3–0 | . | 2–1 | 3–0 | 2–1 | 3–0 | 1–2 | 3–0 | ARK | 6–4 | 4–0 |
| AUB | 17–13 | 2–1 | . | | . | 0–3 | 2–1 | 3–0 | 2–1 | . | . | 1–2 | 3–0 | 2–1 | 0–3 | . | 2–1 | AUB | 7–3 | 2–2 |
| FLA | 15–15 | 2–1 | 2–1 | . | | 0–3 | . | . | 2–1 | 3–0 | . | 1–2 | 3–0 | 0–3 | 2–1 | . | 0–3 | FLA | 6–4 | 2–3 |
| UGA | 18–12 | 1–2 | 2–1 | 3–0 | 3–0 | | 2–1 | . | . | 3–0 | 2–1 | . | . | . | 0–3 | 2–1 | 0–3 | UGA | 7–3 | 3–2 |
| KEN | 13–17 | . | . | 1–2 | . | 1–2 | | . | 0–3 | . | 3–0 | 1–2 | 2–1 | 2–1 | 1–2 | 2–1 | 0–3 | KEN | 4–6 | 1–2 |
| LSU | 19–11 | 2–1 | 2–1 | 0–3 | . | . | . | | 3–0 | 3–0 | 3–0 | . | 2–1 | 2–1 | 1–2 | 1–2 | . | LSU | 7–3 | 3–1 |
| MSU | 15–15 | 2–1 | . | 1–2 | 1–2 | . | 3–0 | 0–3 | | 3–0 | 1–2 | 2–1 | 2–1 | . | 0–3 | . | . | MSU | 5–5 | 2–2 |
| MIZ | 3–27 | 0–3 | 0–3 | . | 0–3 | 0–3 | . | 0–3 | 0–3 | | 0–3 | 0–3 | . | . | 0–3 | 3–0 | . | MIZ | 1–9 | 1–9 |
| OKL | 14–16 | 1–2 | . | . | . | 1–2 | 0–3 | 0–3 | 2–1 | 3–0 | | 2–1 | 2–1 | . | 1–2 | . | 2–1 | OKL | 5–5 | 1–2 |
| OMS | 16–14 | . | 1–2 | 2–1 | 2–1 | . | 2–1 | . | 1–2 | 3–0 | 1–2 | | 1–2 | 1–2 | . | . | 2–1 | OMS | 5–5 | 1–0 |
| SCA | 6–24 | . | 0–3 | 0–3 | 0–3 | . | 1–2 | 1–2 | 1–2 | . | 1–2 | 2–1 | | 0–3 | . | 0–3 | . | SCA | 1–9 | 0–5 |
| TEN | 16–14 | 2–1 | 1–2 | 1–2 | 3–0 | . | 1–2 | 1–2 | . | . | . | 2–1 | 3–0 | | . | 1–2 | 1–2 | TEN | 4–6 | 2–0 |
| TEX | 22–8 | . | 0–3 | 3–0 | 1–2 | 3–0 | 2–1 | 2–1 | 3–0 | 3–0 | 2–1 | . | . | . | | 3–0 | . | TEX | 8–2 | 5–1 |
| TAM | 11–19 | 0–3 | 2–1 | . | . | 1–2 | 1–2 | 2–1 | . | 0–3 | . | . | 3–0 | 2–1 | 0–3 | | 0–3 | TAM | 4–6 | 1–4 |
| VAN | 19–11 | 2–1 | 0–3 | 1–2 | 3–0 | 3–0 | 3–0 | . | . | . | 1–2 | 1–2 | . | 2–1 | . | 3–0 | | VAN | 6–4 | 4–1 |
| Tm | W–L | ALA | ARK | AUB | FLA | UGA | KEN | LSU | MSU | MIZ | OKL | OMS | SCA | TEN | TEX | TAM | VAN | Team | SR | SW |

Updated for entire regular season.
Tie brkrs: LSU>VAN ARK common, OMS>TEN & OMS>ALA VAN common, TEN>ALA hd to hd, FLA>MSU hd to hd.

== See also ==
- 2025 South Carolina Gamecocks softball team
