= 2025 Texas A&M Aggies baseball team =

American college baseball season

2025 Texas A&M Aggies baseball
- Conference: Southeastern Conference
- Record: 30–26 (11–19 SEC)
- Head coach: Michael Earley (1st season)
- Associate head coach: Jason Kelly (1st season)
- Assistant coaches: Caleb Longley (1st season); Will Fox (1st season)
- Home stadium: Olsen Field at Blue Bell Park

2025 Southeastern Conference baseball standings
	Conf.				Overall
Team	W		L	PCT	W		L	PCT
No. 17 Texas ‍†‍‍^{y}	22	–	8	.733	44	–	14	.759
No. 3 Arkansas ‍‍‍^{y}	20	–	10	.667	50	–	15	.769
No. 1 LSU ‍‍‍^{y}	19	–	11	.633	53	–	15	.779
No. 18 Vanderbilt ‍‍‡‍^{y}	19	–	11	.633	43	–	18	.705
No. 19 Georgia ‍‍‍^{y}	18	–	12	.600	43	–	17	.717
No. 11 Auburn ‍‍‍^{y}	17	–	13	.567	41	–	20	.672
No. 21 Ole Miss ‍‍‍^{y}	16	–	14	.533	43	–	21	.672
No. 12 Tennessee ‍‍‍^{y}	16	–	14	.533	46	–	19	.708
Alabama ‍‍‍^{y}	16	–	14	.533	41	–	18	.695
Florida ‍‍‍^{y}	15	–	15	.500	39	–	22	.639
Mississippi State ‍‍‍^{y}	15	–	15	.500	36	–	23	.610
Oklahoma ‍‍‍^{y}	14	–	16	.467	38	–	22	.633
Kentucky ‍‍‍^{y}	13	–	17	.433	31	–	26	.544
Texas A&M ‍‍‍	11	–	19	.367	30	–	26	.536
South Carolina ‍‍‍	6	–	24	.200	28	–	29	.491
Missouri ‍‍‍	3	–	27	.100	16	–	39	.291
† – Conference champion ‡ – Tournament champion y – Invited to the NCAA Tournament; As of June 22, 2025; Rankings from D1Baseball

The 2025 Texas A&M Aggies baseball team represented Texas A&M University in the 2025 NCAA Division I baseball season. The Aggies played their home games at Blue Bell Park.

== Previous season ==
The Aggies finished 53–15, 19–11 in the SEC to finish in 2nd place in the West.

== Personnel ==
=== Roster ===
2025 Texas A&M Aggies Roster
Pitchers	Catchers Infielders	Outfielders Utility Players Legend: (P) Player is also a pitcher; Redshirt

=== Coaches ===
2025 Texas A&M Aggies Coaching Staff
- Michael Earley – head coach – 1st season (4th overall season)
- Jason Kelly – associate head coach – 1st season
- Caleb Longley – assistant coach – 1st season
- Will Fox – assistant coach – 1st Season

=== Support Staff ===
2025 Texas A&M Aggies Support Staff
- Troy Claunch – graduate assistant – 1st season
- Jason Hutchins – director of baseball operations – 27th season
- Jack Mahala – director of players development and analytics – 2nd season
- Jace Hutchins – director of program and pitching development – 1st season
- Kalle Swain – athletic trainer – 2nd season
- Jeremy McMillan – head strength and conditioning coach – 14th season
- Roman Gomez – assistant strength and conditioning coach – 3rd season

== Schedule and results ==
2025 Texas A&M Aggies baseball game log (30–26)
*Denotes non–conference game • Schedule and results source • Rankings based on the teams' current ranking in the D1 Baseball Poll • (#) Tournament seedings in parentheses
W Texas A&M win • L Texas A&M loss • Postponement or cancellation • Bold denotes Texas A&M player
Regular season (28–25)

February (5–3)
Date	Opponent	Rank	Site/stadium	Score	Win	Loss	Save	TV	Attendance	Overall record	SEC record
February 14	Elon	No. 1	Olsen Field at Blue Bell Park; College Station, Texas	**W** 4–2	**Moss** (1–0)	Narke (0–1)	**Freshcorn** (1)	SECN+	8,013	1–0	—
February 15	Elon	No. 1	Olsen Field at Blue Bell Park	**W** 16–6 (7)	**Morton** (1–0)	Krift (0–1)		SECN+	6,740	2–0	—
February 16	Elon	No. 1	Olsen Field at Blue Bell Park	**W** 12–6 (8)	**Patton** (1–0)	Lavelle (0–1)		SECN+	5,853	3–0	—
February 18	McNeese	No. 1	Olsen Field at Blue Bell Park	Canceled							
February 21	Cal Poly	No. 1	Olsen Field at Blue Bell Park	**W** 6–1	**Prager** (1–0)	Naess (0–1)		SECN+	4,922	4–0	—
February 22	Cal Poly	No. 1	Olsen Field at Blue Bell Park	**W** 4–3	**Freshcorn** (1–0)	Torres (0–2)	**Jackson** (1)	SECN+	5,411	5–0	—
February 23	Cal Poly	No. 1	Olsen Field at Blue Bell Park	**L** 2–3	Sagouspe (1–0)	**Freshcorn** (1–1)		SECN+	5,315	5–1	—
February 25	Texas State	No. 1	Olsen Field at Blue Bell Park	**L** 3–7	Valentin (1–0)	**McCoy** (0–1)		SECN+	5,930	5–2	—
Astros Foundation College Classic
February 28	vs. Arizona	No. 1	Daikin Park; Houston, Texas	**L** 2–3	Hintz (2–0)	**Freshcorn** (1–2)		Space City Home Network	11,502	5–3	—

March (8–11)
Date	Opponent	Rank	Site/stadium	Score	Win	Loss	Save	TV	Attendance	Overall record	SEC record
March 1	vs. Oklahoma State	No. 1	Daikin Park	**L** 0–4	Bodendorf (3–0)	**Lamkin** (0–1)		Space City Home Network	16,226	5–4	—
March 2	vs. Rice	No. 1	Daikin Park	**W** 14–4 (7)	**Patton** (2–0)	Fernandez (0–1)		Space City Home Network	9,439	6–4	—
March 4	UTSA	No. 14	Olsen Field at Blue Bell Park	**L** 4–7	Orloski (4–0)	**Moss** (1–1)	Owens (1)	SECN+	4,922	6–5	—
March 5	Texas Southern	No. 14	Olsen Field at Blue Bell Park	**W** 6–2	**Lyons** (1–0)	Mayes (0–2)		SECN+	4,448	7–5	—
March 7	New Mexico State	No. 14	Olsen Field at Blue Bell Park	**W** 19–0 (7)	**Prager** (2–0)	Turner (2–1)		SECN+	5,677	8–5	—
March 8	New Mexico State	No. 14	Olsen Field at Blue Bell Park	**W** 7–1	**Lamkin** (1–1)	Lewis (0–1)		SECN+	6,055	9–5	—
March 9	New Mexico State	No. 14	Olsen Field at Blue Bell Park	**L** 1–4	Soto (2–0)	**Patton** (2–1)		SECN+	5,519	9–6	—
March 11	Prairie View A&M	No. 19	Olsen Field at Blue Bell Park	**W** 14–0 (7)	**Moss** (2–1)	Thompson (0–2)		SECN+	4,931	10–6	—
March 14	No. 17 Alabama	No. 19	Olsen Field at Blue Bell Park	**L** 4–6	Ozmer (1–0)	**Rudis** (0–1)		SECN+	6,917	10–7	0–1
March 15	No. 17 Alabama	No. 19	Olsen Field at Blue Bell Park	**L** 2–6	Heiberger (2–1)	**Wilson** (0–1)		SECN+	6,929	10–8	0–2
March 16	No. 17 Alabama	No. 19	Olsen Field at Blue Bell Park	**L** 0–2	Alcock (3–0)	**Patton** (2–2)	Myers (1)	SEC Network	6,864	10–9	0–3
March 18	Texas A&M–Corpus Christi		Olsen Field at Blue Bell Park	**W** 17–7 (7)	**Cunningham** (1–0)	Molina (0–1)		SECN+	5,226	11–9	—
March 20	at No. 22 Vanderbilt		Hawkins Field; Nashville, Tennessee	**L** 3–5	Kranzler (2–0)	**Prager** (2–1)	Hawks (1)	SEC Network	3,802	11–10	0–4
March 21	at No. 22 Vanderbilt		Hawkins Field	**L** 1–3	O'Rourke (2–0)	**Lamkin** (1–2)	Green (1)	SECN+	3,802	11–11	0–5
March 22	at No. 22 Vanderbilt		Hawkins Field	**L** 5–8	Kranzler (3–0)	**Moss** (2–2)	O'Rourke (1)	SECN+	3,802	11–12	0–6
March 25	Houston Christian		Olsen Field at Blue Bell Park	**W** 7–2	**Freshcorn** (2–2)	Mentzel (1–1)	**McCoy** (1)	SECN+	4,624	12–12	—
March 28	Kentucky		Olsen Field at Blue Bell Park	**W** 9–7	**Moss** (3–2)	Adcock (1–1)		SECN+	5,952	13–12	1–6
March 29	Kentucky		Olsen Field at Blue Bell Park	**L** 11–14	Skelding (1–0)	**Lamkin** (1–3)	McCoy (1)	SECN+	7,317	13–13	1–7
March 30	Kentucky		Olsen Field at Blue Bell Park	**L** 5–10 (8)	Cleaver (3–1)	**Patton** (2–3)		SECN+	5,643	13–14	1–8

April (12–5)
Date	Opponent	Rank	Site/stadium	Score	Win	Loss	Save	TV	Attendance	Overall record	SEC record
April 1	Incarnate Word		Olsen Field at Blue Bell Park	**W** 21–1 (7)	**Lyons** (2–0)	Garcia (2–3)		SECN+	4,373	14–14	—
April 4	at No. 1 Tennessee		Lindsey Nelson Stadium; Knoxville, Tennessee	**L** 0–10 (7)	Doyle (5–1)	**Prager** (2)		ESPNU	6,544	14–15	1–9
April 5	at No. 1 Tennessee		Lindsey Nelson Stadium	**W** 9–3	**Lamkin** (2–3)	Phillips (2–1)	**Moss** (1)	SECN+	5,650	15–15	2–9
April 6	at No. 1 Tennessee		Lindsey Nelson Stadium	**W** 17–6 (8)	**Patton** (3–3)	Kuhns (2–1)		ESPN2	6,074	16–15	3–9
April 8	at Sam Houston		Don Sanders Stadium; Huntsville, Texas	**W** 14–1 (7)	**McCoy** (1–1)	Diaz (0–2)		ESPN+	1,189	17–15	—
April 10	South Carolina		Olsen Field at Blue Bell Park	**W** 8–7 (10)	**Moss** (4–2)	Sweeney (0–3)		ESPNU	5,927	18–15	4–9
April 11	South Carolina		Olsen Field at Blue Bell Park	**W** 17–0 (7)	**Lamkin** (3–3)	Becker (2–3)		SECN+	6,768	19–15	5–9
April 12	South Carolina		Olsen Field at Blue Bell Park	**W** 15–12	**Mccoy** (2–1)	Jones (0–1)		SECN+	7,457	20–15	6–9
April 15	Tarleton State		Olsen Field at Blue Bell Park	**W** 11–3	**McCoy** (3–1)	Hatch (0–1)	None	SECN+	5,808	21–15	—
April 17	at No. 2 Arkansas		Baum–Walker Stadium; Fayetteville, Arkansas	**W** 7–4	**Moss** (5–2)	Root (5–2)	None	SEC Network	10,915	22–15	7–9
April 18	at No. 2 Arkansas		Baum–Walker Stadium	**L** 5–11	Gaeckle (3–1)	**Lamkin** (3–4)		SECN+	10,119	22–16	7–10
April 19	at No. 2 Arkansas		Baum–Walker Stadium	**W** 9–2	**Jackson** (1–0)	Jimenez (4–1)		SECN+	10,915	23–16	8–10
April 22	Sam Houston		Olsen Field at Blue Bell Park	**W** 13–3 (7)	**Sims** (1–0)	Marthiljohni (2–2)	None	SECN+	5,199	24–16	–
April 25	at No. 1 Texas		UFCU Disch–Falk Field; Austin, Texas	**L** 1–2	Riojas (8–1)	**Prager** (2–3)	Volantis (10)	SEC Network	7,942	24–17	8–11
April 26	at No. 1 Texas		UFCU Disch–Falk Field	**L** 2–3	Harrison (4–0)	**Lamkin** (3–5)	Volantis (11)	ESPN2	7,808	24–18	8–12
April 27	at No. 1 Texas		UFCU Disch–Falk Field	**L** 5–6	Saunier (1–0)	**McCoy** (3–2)	Grubbs (5)	ESPN2	7,930	24–19	8–13
April 29	Lamar		Olsen Field at Blue Bell Park	**W** 13–6	**Rudis** (1–1)	Sutton (5–2)	**McCoy** (2)	ESPNU	5,351	25–19	–

May (3–6)
Date	Opponent	Rank	Site/stadium	Score	Win	Loss	Save	TV	Attendance	Overall record	SEC record
May 3 (DH 1)	No. 2 LSU		Olsen Field at Blue Bell Park	**W** 3–1	**Prager** (3–3)	Cowan (2–1)	**Wilson** (1)	ESPNU	7,768	26–19	9–13
May 3 (DH 2)	No. 2 LSU		Olsen Field at Blue Bell Park	**L** 1–2	Eyanson (7–2)	**Lamkin** (3–6)	None	ESPNU	7,271	26–20	9–14
May 4	No. 2 LSU		Olsen Field at Blue Bell Park	**W** 6–4	**Moss** (6–2)	Cowan (2–2)	None	ESPNU	7,233	27–20	10–14
May 6	at Houston		Schroeder Park; Houston, Texas	Canceled due to forecasted inclement weather							
May 9	Missouri		Olsen Field at Blue Bell Park	**L** 6-9	Lovett (2-2)	**Wilson** (0-2)	None	SECN+	6,521	27–21	10–15
May 10	Missouri		Olsen Field at Blue Bell Park	**L** 1-4	Neubeck (1-4)	**Lamkin** (3-7)	Lucas (1)	SECN+	6,753	27–22	10–16
May 11	Missouri		Olsen Field at Blue Bell Park	**L** 1-10	Libbert (3-3)	**Patton** (3-4)	McDevitt (1)	SECN+	5,623	27–23	10–17
May 15	at No. 10 Georgia		Foley Field; Athens, Georgia	**L** 6–10	Quinn (1–1)	**Prager** (3–4)	Harris (3)	SECN+	3,633	27–24	10–18
May 16	at No. 10 Georgia		Foley Field	**W** 6–0	**Lamkin** (4–7)	Curley (4–3)	None	SECN+	3,633	28–24	11–18
May 17	at No. 10 Georgia		Foley Field	**L** 5–7	Smith (5–3)	**Moss** (6–3)	Harris (4)	SECN+	3,633	28–25	11–19

Postseason (2–1)

SEC Tournament (2–1)
Date	Opponent	TV	Rank	Site/stadium	Score	Win	Loss	Save	Attendance	Overall record	Tournament record
May 21	vs. (11) Mississippi State	(14)	Hoover Metropolitan Stadium; Hoover, Alabama	**W** 9–0	**Prager** (5–0)	McPherson (4–1)	None	SECN	7,242	29–25	1–0
May 22	vs. (6) No. 8 Auburn	(14)	Hoover Metropolitan Stadium	**W** 3–2	**Lamkin** (5–7)	Tilly (3–3)	**Freshcorn** (1)	SECN	9,812	30–25	2–0
May 23	vs. (3) No. 1 LSU	(14)	Hoover Metropolitan Stadium	**L** 3–4	Anderson (8–1)	**Patton** (3–5)	Eyanson (1)	SECN	13,627	30–26	2–1

== Record vs. conference opponents ==
Blank are not scheduled. Blue are home games, otherwise away.

2025 SEC baseball records Source: 2025 SEC baseball game results, 2025 SEC baseball schedule
Tm	W–L	ALA	ARK	AUB	FLA	UGA	KEN	LSU	MSU	MIZ	OKL	OMS	SCA	TEN	TEX	TAM	VAN	Tm	SR	SW
ALA	16–14		.	1–2	1–2	2–1	.	1–2	1–2	3–0	2–1	.	.	1–2	.	3–0	1–2	ALA	4–6	2–0
ARK	20–10	.		.	1–2	1–2	.	1–2	.	3–0	.	2–1	3–0	2–1	3–0	1–2	3–0	ARK	6–4	4–0
AUB	17–13	2–1	.		.	0–3	2–1	3–0	2–1	.	.	1–2	3–0	2–1	0–3	.	2–1	AUB	7–3	2–2
FLA	15–15	2–1	2–1	.		0–3	.	.	2–1	3–0	.	1–2	3–0	0–3	2–1	.	0–3	FLA	6–4	2–3
UGA	18–12	1–2	2–1	3–0	3–0		2–1	.	.	3–0	2–1	.	.	.	0–3	2–1	0–3	UGA	7–3	3–2
KEN	13–17	.	.	1–2	.	1–2		.	0–3	.	3–0	1–2	2–1	2–1	1–2	2–1	0–3	KEN	4–6	1–2
LSU	19–11	2–1	2–1	0–3	.	.	.		3–0	3–0	3–0	.	2–1	2–1	1–2	1–2	.	LSU	7–3	3–1
MSU	15–15	2–1	.	1–2	1–2	.	3–0	0–3		3–0	1–2	2–1	2–1	.	0–3	.	.	MSU	5–5	2–2
MIZ	3–27	0–3	0–3	.	0–3	0–3	.	0–3	0–3		0–3	0–3	.	.	0–3	3–0	.	MIZ	1–9	1–9
OKL	14–16	1–2	.	.	.	1–2	0–3	0–3	2–1	3–0		2–1	2–1	.	1–2	.	2–1	OKL	5–5	1–2
OMS	16–14	.	1–2	2–1	2–1	.	2–1	.	1–2	3–0	1–2		1–2	1–2	.	.	2–1	OMS	5–5	1–0
SCA	6–24	.	0–3	0–3	0–3	.	1–2	1–2	1–2	.	1–2	2–1		0–3	.	0–3	.	SCA	1–9	0–5
TEN	16–14	2–1	1–2	1–2	3–0	.	1–2	1–2	.	.	.	2–1	3–0		.	1–2	1–2	TEN	4–6	2–0
TEX	22–8	.	0–3	3–0	1–2	3–0	2–1	2–1	3–0	3–0	2–1	.	.	.		3–0	.	TEX	8–2	5–1
TAM	11–19	0–3	2–1	.	.	1–2	1–2	2–1	.	0–3	.	.	3–0	2–1	0–3		0–3	TAM	4–6	1–4
VAN	19–11	2–1	0–3	1–2	3–0	3–0	3–0	.	.	.	1–2	1–2	.	2–1	.	3–0		VAN	6–4	4–1
Tm	W–L	ALA	ARK	AUB	FLA	UGA	KEN	LSU	MSU	MIZ	OKL	OMS	SCA	TEN	TEX	TAM	VAN	Team	SR	SW

Updated for entire regular season.
Tie brkrs: LSU>VAN ARK common, OMS>TEN & OMS>ALA VAN common, TEN>ALA hd to hd, FLA>MSU hd to hd.

== Rankings ==
Ranking movements Legend: ██ Increase in ranking ██ Decrease in ranking — = Not ranked RV = Received votes ( ) = First-place votes
	Week																
Poll	Pre	1	2	3	4	5	6	7	8	9	10	11	12	13	14	15	Final
Coaches'	1 (17)	1 (17)*	2 (11)	14	21	RV	—	—	—	—	—	—	RV	—	—	—	
Baseball America	1	1	2	11	21	—	—	—	—	—	—	—	—	—	—	—	
NCBWA†	1	1	1	2	15	RV	—	—	—	RV	RV	RV	RV	RV	RV	RV	
D1Baseball	1	1	1	14	19	—	—	—	—	—	—	—	—	—	—	—	
Perfect Game	1	1	1	11	16	—	—	—	—	—	—	—	—	—	—	—	

† NCBWA ranks 30 teams in their preseason poll, but only ranks 25 teams weekly during the season.
* A new poll was not released for this week, so for comparison purposes, the previous week's ranking is inserted in this week's slot.
