= 2025 Vanderbilt Commodores baseball team =

American college baseball season

2025 Vanderbilt Commodores baseball

SEC Tournament champions

Nashville Regional, 1–2
- Conference: Southeastern Conference

Ranking
- Coaches: No. 4
- D1Baseball.com: No. 2
- Record: 43–18 (19–11 SEC)
- Head coach: Tim Corbin (23rd season)
- Associate head coach: Scott Brown (9th season)
- Assistant coaches: Jayson King (1st season); Ty Blankmeyer (1st season)
- Pitching coach: Scott Brown (13th season)
- Home stadium: Hawkins Field

2025 Southeastern Conference baseball standings
	Conf.				Overall
Team	W		L	PCT	W		L	PCT
No. 17 Texas ‍†‍‍^{y}	22	–	8	.733	44	–	14	.759
No. 3 Arkansas ‍‍‍^{y}	20	–	10	.667	50	–	15	.769
No. 1 LSU ‍‍‍^{y}	19	–	11	.633	53	–	15	.779
No. 18 Vanderbilt ‍‍‡‍^{y}	19	–	11	.633	43	–	18	.705
No. 19 Georgia ‍‍‍^{y}	18	–	12	.600	43	–	17	.717
No. 11 Auburn ‍‍‍^{y}	17	–	13	.567	41	–	20	.672
No. 21 Ole Miss ‍‍‍^{y}	16	–	14	.533	43	–	21	.672
No. 12 Tennessee ‍‍‍^{y}	16	–	14	.533	46	–	19	.708
Alabama ‍‍‍^{y}	16	–	14	.533	41	–	18	.695
Florida ‍‍‍^{y}	15	–	15	.500	39	–	22	.639
Mississippi State ‍‍‍^{y}	15	–	15	.500	36	–	23	.610
Oklahoma ‍‍‍^{y}	14	–	16	.467	38	–	22	.633
Kentucky ‍‍‍^{y}	13	–	17	.433	31	–	26	.544
Texas A&M ‍‍‍	11	–	19	.367	30	–	26	.536
South Carolina ‍‍‍	6	–	24	.200	28	–	29	.491
Missouri ‍‍‍	3	–	27	.100	16	–	39	.291
† – Conference champion ‡ – Tournament champion y – Invited to the NCAA Tournament; As of June 22, 2025; Rankings from D1Baseball

The 2025 Vanderbilt Commodores baseball team represented Vanderbilt University during the 2025 NCAA Division I baseball season. The Commodores played their home games at Hawkins Field as a member of the Southeastern Conference. They were led by 23rd-year head coach Tim Corbin.

== Previous season ==
The 2024 Vanderbilt Commodores baseball team posted a 38–23 (13–17) season record. The Commodores finished fourth in the SEC east regular season, and reached the semifinals of the 2024 Southeastern Conference baseball tournament, before losing to their in-state rivals, Tennessee. Vanderbilt earned an at-large bid into the 2024 NCAA Division I baseball tournament, where they were seeded second in the Clemson Regional. There, they went two-and-out suffering defeats against Coastal Carolina and High Point.

Following the conclusion of the season, assistant coach and recruiting coordinator, Mike Baxter left the coaching staff. Assistant coach, Tyler Shewmaker, left to take a coaching role with Coastal Carolina.

== Preseason ==
=== Preseason SEC awards and honors ===
Preseason awards will be announced in February 2025.

Preseason All-SEC Team

Preseason SEC Player of the Year

=== Coaches poll ===
The coaches poll was released on February 7, 2025. Vanderbilt was predicted to finish seventh.

Coaches' Poll
Predicted finish	Team	Points
1	Texas A&M	228 (10)
2	Tennessee	215 (1)
3	Arkansas	214 (3)
4	LSU	204 (1)
5	Florida	183 (1)
6	Georgia	165
7	Vanderbilt	156
8	Texas	146
9	Mississippi State	112
10	Kentucky	102
11	Oklahoma	101
12	Auburn	100
13	Alabama	98
14	South Carolina	61
15	Ole Miss	60
16	Missouri	31

== Personnel ==
=== Starters ===
Lineup
Pos.	No.	Player.	Year
C			
1B			
2B			
3B			
SS			
LF			
CF			
RF			
DH			

Weekend pitching rotation
Day	No.	Player.	Year
Friday			
Saturday			
Sunday			

=== Roster ===
2025 Vanderbilt Commodores baseball team
Players
Coaches

#	Pos.	Name	B/T	Height	Weight	Year	Home town
2	UTL	RJ Hamilton	R/R	5 ft 10 in (1.78 m)	185 lb (84 kg)	So	(Alabama) Hoover
3	INF	Jayden Davis	R/R	5 ft 10 in (1.78 m)	205 lb (93 kg)	Jr	(Tennessee) Cookeville
5	INF	Mike Mancini	L/R	5 ft 11 in (1.8 m)	173 lb (78 kg)	Jr	(New York (state)) Endwell
8	INF	Chris Maldonado	R/R	6 ft 1 in (1.85 m)	196 lb (89 kg)	Jr	(New Jersey) Short Hills
9	INF	Brodie Johnston	R/R	6 ft 2 in (1.88 m)	203 lb (92 kg)	Fr	(Tennessee) Ooltewah
10	UTL	Jacob Humphrey	R/R	5 ft 10 in (1.78 m)	180 lb (82 kg)	Sr	(Maine) Standish
13	INF	Jonathan Vastine	L/R	5 ft 11 in (1.8 m)	174 lb (79 kg)	Sr	(Florida) Bartow
16	C	Mac Rose	L/R	6 ft 0 in (1.83 m)	195 lb (88 kg)	So	(Texas) Rockwall
17	LHP	Ryan Ginther (redshirt)	R/L	5 ft 11 in (1.8 m)	198 lb (90 kg)	So	(Tennessee) Hendersonville
18	OF	JD Rogers	L/L	5 ft 10 in (1.78 m)	207 lb (94 kg)	Sr	(Indiana) Carmel
19	INF	Rustan Rigdon	S/R	6 ft 0 in (1.83 m)	177 lb (80 kg)	Fr	(Georgia (U.S. state)) Metter
20	UTL	David Mendez	R/R	5 ft 11 in (1.8 m)	184 lb (83 kg)	So	(Virginia) Aldie
21	RHP	Hudson Barton	R/R	6 ft 3 in (1.91 m)	199 lb (90 kg)	Fr	(Tennessee) Franklin, TN
22	LHP	JD Thompson	R/L	6 ft 0 in (1.83 m)	199 lb (90 kg)	Jr	(Texas) Rusk
25	C	AJ DePaolo	R/R	5 ft 11 in (1.8 m)	195 lb (88 kg)	Fr	(Texas) Carrollton
26	INF	Braden Holcomb	R/R	6 ft 5 in (1.96 m)	240 lb (109 kg)	So	(Florida) Ocoee
28	C	Will Hampton	L/L	5 ft 11 in (1.8 m)	197 lb (89 kg)	Fr	(Georgia (U.S. state)) Richmond Hill
30	RHP	Ethan Robinson	R/R	6 ft 5 in (1.96 m)	223 lb (101 kg)	So	(Tennessee) Murfreesboro
32	INF	Riley Nelson	L/R	6 ft 3 in (1.91 m)	222 lb (101 kg)	Jr	(Texas) Trophy Club
33	RHP	Luke Guth	R/R	6 ft 1 in (1.85 m)	182 lb (83 kg)	So	(Pennsylvania) Franklin
34	RHP	Brennan Seiber	R/R	6 ft 6 in (1.98 m)	240 lb (109 kg)	So	(California) Newport Beach
36	LHP	Levi Huesman	R/L	6 ft 0 in (1.83 m)	186 lb (84 kg)	Jr	(Virginia) Hanover
37	LHP	Jakob Schulz	R/L	6 ft 2 in (1.88 m)	206 lb (93 kg)	So	(Texas) Houston
39	RHP	Connor Fennell	R/R	6 ft 1 in (1.85 m)	168 lb (76 kg)	So	(New Hampshire) Londonderry
40	RHP	Austin Nye	R/R	6 ft 2 in (1.88 m)	205 lb (93 kg)	Fr	(California) Roseville
42	UTL	RJ Austin	R/R	5 ft 11 in (1.8 m)	199 lb (90 kg)	Jr	(Georgia (U.S. state)) Atlanta
43	LHP	Matthew Shorey	L/L	6 ft 2 in (1.88 m)	176 lb (80 kg)	Fr	(Tennessee) Nashville
44	C	Colin Barczi	R/R	6 ft 3 in (1.91 m)	213 lb (97 kg)	So	(Illinois) Naperville
45	LHP	Aiden O'Connell	L/L	6 ft 2 in (1.88 m)	191 lb (87 kg)	Fr	(New Hampshire) Bedford
46	LHP	Roman Petricca	R/L	6 ft 2 in (1.88 m)	175 lb (79 kg)	Fr	(Tennessee) Mount Juliet
47	OF	Tommy Goodin	L/R	6 ft 1 in (1.85 m)	192 lb (87 kg)	Fr	(California) Thousand Oaks
50	C	Aukai Kea	R/R	6 ft 1 in (1.85 m)	202 lb (92 kg)	Fr	(Hawaii) Kapolei
51	INF	Ryker Waite	S/R	5 ft 10 in (1.78 m)	176 lb (80 kg)	Fr	(Arizona) Queen Creek
55	RHP	Cody Bowker	R/R	6 ft 1 in (1.85 m)	212 lb (96 kg)	Jr	(Maine) Bowdoinham
66	RHP	Deegan Cordova	R/R	6 ft 2 in (1.88 m)	188 lb (85 kg)	So	(Arizona) Lake Havasu City
70	RHP	Tristan Bristow	R/R	6 ft 3 in (1.91 m)	189 lb (86 kg)	Fr	(Texas) Helotes
73	RHP	Tommy O'Rourke	R/R	6 ft 2 in (1.88 m)	211 lb (96 kg)	Gr	(New Jersey) Morristown
77	RHP	Alex Kranzler	R/R	6 ft 3 in (1.91 m)	222 lb (101 kg)	So	(New Jersey) Norwood
88	RHP	Sawyer Hawks	R/R	6 ft 4 in (1.93 m)	215 lb (98 kg)	Sr	(Florida) Lakeland
89	LHP	Ethan McElvain	S/L	6 ft 4 in (1.93 m)	238 lb (108 kg)	So	(Tennessee) Thompson's Station
90	LHP	Miller Green	L/L	6 ft 5 in (1.96 m)	230 lb (104 kg)	So	(Tennessee) Nashville
96	RHP	Nate Teague	R/R	6 ft 7 in (2.01 m)	232 lb (105 kg)	So	(North Carolina) Snow Camp
99	RHP	England Bryan	R/R	6 ft 1 in (1.85 m)	231 lb (105 kg)	Fr	(Tennessee) Hillsboro

Head coach

Tim Corbin

Assistant coach(es)

Scott Brown
Jayson King
Ty Blankmeyer

Legend

- (C) Team captain
- (S) Suspended
- (I) Ineligible
- Injured
- Current redshirt

Roster
Last update: May 28, 2025

=== Coaching staff ===
2025 Vanderbilt Commodores baseball coaching staff
Name	Position	Seasons at Vandy	Alma mater
Tim Corbin	Head coach	23	Ohio State University (1984)
Scott Brown	Associate head coach	13	Cortland State University (1999)
Jayson King	Assistant coach	1	Framingham State University (1993)
Ty Blankmeyer	Assistant coach	1	St. John's University (2016)

== Offseason ==
=== Departures ===
Offseason departures
Name	Number	Pos.	Height	Weight	Year	Hometown	Notes
Matthew Polk	1	UTL	5 ft 11 in (1.80 m)	192 pounds (87 kg)	Long Beach, CA	Junior	(Note: Sat out for the season and would enter the transfer portal during postseason.)
Jack Bulger	16	C	6 ft 0 in (1.83 m)	222 pounds (101 kg)	Bowie, MD	Senior	
Troy LaNeve	19	OF	6 ft 0 in (1.83 m)	205 pounds (93 kg)	Pittsburgh, PA	Fifth Year	
Calvin Hewett	21	OF	6 ft 3 in (1.91 m)	218 pounds (99 kg)	Greenland, NH	Senior	
Duke Ekstrom	31	RHP	6 ft 2 in (1.88 m)	195 pounds (88 kg)	San Diego, CA	Freshman	

==== Outgoing transfers ====
Outgoing transfers
Name	Number	Pos.	Height	Weight	Hometown	Year	New school	Source
Logan Poteet	5	C	6 ft 2 in (1.88 m)	219 pounds (99 kg)	Powell, TN	Sophomore	Charlotte	
Matt Wolfe	6	INF	6 ft 1 in (1.85 m)	198 pounds (90 kg)	Westerville, OH	Sophomore	Middle Tennessee	
Ray Velazquez	9	INF	6 ft 1 in (1.85 m)	212 pounds (96 kg)	Lowell, MA	Sophomore	Austin Peay	
Devan Kodali	23	OF	6 ft 2 in (1.88 m)	196 pounds (89 kg)	New York City, NY	Sophomore		
Matt Ossenfort	25	INF	6 ft 3 in (1.91 m)	218 pounds (99 kg)	Sioux Falls, SD	Freshman	NC State	
Kaito Muto	27	UTL	5 ft 7 in (1.70 m)	170 pounds (77 kg)	Bowling Green, KY	Freshman	Columbia State (Note: Junior college)	
Camden Kozeal	28	INF	5 ft 10 in (1.78 m)	207 pounds (94 kg)	Omaha, NE	Freshman	Arkansas	
Cooper Holbrook	32	OF	6 ft 3 in (1.91 m)	211 pounds (96 kg)	Charleston, SC	Sophomore	Rice	
Nik Copenhaver	35	RHP	6 ft 4 in (1.93 m)	210 pounds (95 kg)	Hamilton, OH	Freshman	Ohio State	
David Horn Jr.	38	RHP	6 ft 4 in (1.93 m)	224 pounds (102 kg)	Mission Viejo, CA	Sophomore	San Diego	
David Hliboki	40	RHP	6 ft 3 in (1.91 m)	207 pounds (94 kg)	Los Angeles, CA	Graduate	Northwestern	
Colton Regen	55	RHP	6 ft 4 in (1.93 m)	188 pounds (85 kg)	Lebanon, TN	Freshman	Western Kentucky	
Koby Kropf	80	UTL	6 ft 1 in (1.85 m)	215 pounds (98 kg)	Clovis, CA	RS Senior	Winthrop	

==== 2024 MLB draft ====
Round	Pick	Overall pick	Player	Position	MLB team	Source
2	14	53	Bryce Cunningham	RHP	New York Yankees	
2	26	62	Carter Holton	LHP	Atlanta Braves	
5	16	152	Greysen Carter	RHP	New York Yankees	
7	6	201	Andrew Dutkanych IV	RHP	St. Louis Cardinals	
8	1	226	Davis Diaz	C	Oakland Athletics	
10	12	297	Devin Futrell	LHP	Boston Red Sox	
11	3	318	Alan Espinal	C	Colorado Rockies	

=== Acquisitions ===
==== Incoming transfers ====
Incoming transfers
Name	Number	Pos.	Height	Weight	Hometown	Year	Previous school	Source
Mike Mancini	5	INF	5 ft 11 in (1.80 m)	170 pounds (77 kg)	Endwell, NY	Junior	James Madison	
Mac Rose	16	C	6 ft 0 in (1.83 m)	200 pounds (91 kg)	Rockwall, TX	Sophomore	McLennan	
David Mendez	20	UTL	5 ft 11 in (1.80 m)	180 pounds (82 kg)	Aldie, VA	Sophomore	Dayton	
Riley Nelson	32	INF	6 ft 3 in (1.91 m)	222 pounds (101 kg)	Trophy Club, TX	Junior	Yavapai	
Connor Fennell	39	RHP	6 ft 1 in (1.85 m)	170 pounds (77 kg)	Londonderry, NH	Sophomore	Dayton	
Cody Bowker	55	RHP	6 ft 1 in (1.85 m)	190 pounds (86 kg)	Bowdoinham, ME	Junior	Georgetown	
Tommy O'Rourke	73	RHP	6 ft 2 in (1.88 m)	218 pounds (99 kg)	Morristown, NJ	RS Junior	Stanford	
Koby Kropf		UTL	6 ft 1 in (1.85 m)	215 pounds (98 kg)	Clovis, CA	RS Senior	USC Upstate	

==== Incoming recruits ====
2024 Vanderbilt recruits
Name	Number	B/T	Pos.	Height	Weight	Hometown	High School	Source
Brodie Johnston	9	R/R	INF	6 ft 2 in (1.88 m)	203 pounds (92 kg)	Ooltewah, TN	Boyd-Buchanan School	
Rustan Rigdon	19	S/R	INF	6 ft 0 in (1.83 m)	177 pounds (80 kg)	Metter, GA	Metter	
Hudson Barton	21	R/R	RHP	6 ft 3 in (1.91 m)	199 pounds (90 kg)	Franklin, TN	Grace Christian Academy	
AJ DePaolo	25	R/R	C	5 ft 11 in (1.80 m)	195 pounds (88 kg)	Carrollton, TX	Prestonwood Christian Academy	
Will Hampton	28	L/L	INF/OF	5 ft 11 in (1.80 m)	197 pounds (89 kg)	Richmond Hill, GA	Calvary Day School	
Austin Nye	40	R/R	RHP	6 ft 2 in (1.88 m)	205 pounds (93 kg)	Roseville, CA	Woodcreek	
Matthew Shorey	43	L/L	LHP	6 ft 2 in (1.88 m)	176 pounds (80 kg)	Nashville, TN	Father Ryan	
Aiden O'Connell	45	L/L	LHP	6 ft 2 in (1.88 m)	191 pounds (87 kg)	Bedford, NH	Bedford	
Roman Petricca	46	R/L	LHP	6 ft 2 in (1.88 m)	175 pounds (79 kg)	Mount Juliet, TN	Mount Juliet	
Tommy Goodin	47	L/R	OF	6 ft 1 in (1.85 m)	192 pounds (87 kg)	Thousand Oaks, CA	Adolfo Camarillo	
Aukai Kea	50	R/R	C	6 ft 1 in (1.85 m)	202 pounds (92 kg)	Kapolei, HI	IMG Academy	
Ryker Waite	51	S/R	INF	5 ft 10 in (1.78 m)	176 pounds (80 kg)	Queen Creek, AZ	Queen Creek	
Tristan Bristow	70	R/R	RHP	6 ft 3 in (1.91 m)	189 pounds (86 kg)	Helotes, TX	Harlan	
England Bryan	99	R/R	RHP	6 ft 1 in (1.85 m)	231 pounds (105 kg)	Hillsboro, TN	Middle Tennessee Christian	

== Game log ==
2025 Vanderbilt Commodores baseball game log (42–16)
Regular season (39–16)

February (9–1)
Date	TV	Opponent	Rank	Stadium	Score	Win	Loss	Save	Attendance	Overall	SEC	Source
MLB Desert Invitational
February 14	MLBN	at Grand Canyon*	No. 16	Brazell Field; Phoenix, AZ	**W** 4–3	**Hawks** (1–0)	Lyon (0–1)	**Green** (1)	5,294	1–0	—	Report
February 15	MLBN	vs. No. 24 Nebraska*	No. 16	Salt River Fields at Talking Stick; Phoenix, AZ	**L** 4–6	Worthley (1–0)	**McElvain** (0–1)	Broderick (1)	3,000	1–1	—	Report
February 16	MLB.com	vs. UC Irvine*	No. 16	Sloan Park; Mesa, AZ	**W** 9–8	**O'Rourke** (1–0)	Butler (0–1)	**Green** (2)	825	2–1		
February 17	SECN+	Air Force*	No. 15	Hawkins Field; Nashville, TN	**W** 3–1	**Fennell** (1–0)	Brantingham (0–1)	**Kranzler** (1)	3,344	3–1		
February 18	SECN+	Air Force*	No. 15	Hawkins Field	**W** 5–2	**Schulz** (1–0)	Smelcer (0–2)	**Ginther** (1)	3,172	4–1		
February 21	SECN+	St. Mary's (CA)*	No. 15	Hawkins Field	**W** 11–4	**Hawks** (2–0)	Eaquinto (0–1)	None	3,306	5–1		
February 22	SECN+	St. Mary's (CA)*	No. 15	Hawkins Field	**W** 13–7	**Shorey** (1–0)	Emerling (0–1)	None	3,360	6–1		
February 23	SECN+	St. Mary's (CA)*	No. 15	Hawkins Field	**W** 10–0 (7)	**Bowker** (1–0)	Kretsch (0–1)	None	3,265	7–1		
February 25	SECN+	Tennessee Tech*	No. 14	Hawkins Field	**W** 16–3 (7)	**Seiber** (1–0)	Vega (1–1)	None	3,200	8–1		
Southern California College Baseball Classic
February 28	B1G+	at UCLA*	No. 14	Jackie Robinson Stadium; Los Angeles, CA	**W** 8–3	**Thompson** (1–0)	Delvecchio (0–2)	**Kranzler** (2)	1,095	9–1		

March (11–7)
Date	TV	Opponent	Rank	Stadium	Score	Win	Loss	Save	Attendance	Overall	SEC	Source
Southern California College Baseball Classic
March 1	B1G+	vs. USC*	No. 14	Orange County Great Park; Irvine, CA	**L** 1–3	Aoki (1–0)	**McElvain** (0–2)	Hedges (4)	3,518	9–2		
March 2		vs. UConn*	No. 14	Jackie Robinson Stadium	**L** 2–6	Ellisen (1–1)	**Bowker** (1–1)	None	290	9–3		
March 4	SECN+	Evansville*	No. 18	Hawkins Field	**Cancelled**							
March 5	SECN+	St. Bonaventure*	No. 18	Hawkins Field	**W** 14–1 (7)	**Barton** (1–0)	Barger (1–1)	None	3,064	10–3		
March 7	SECN+	Xavier*	No. 18	Hawkins Field	**W** 15–3 (7)	**Thompson** (2–0)	Hooker (0–2)	None	3,254	11–3		
March 8	SECN+	Xavier*	No. 18	Hawkins Field	**W** 6–1	**Kranzler** (1–0)	Piech (1–1)	**Green** (3)	3,373	12–3		
March 9	SECN+	Xavier*	No. 18	Hawkins Field	**W** 4–0	**Bowker** (2–1)	Chavana (1–1)	**Hawks** (1)	3,323	13–3		
March 11	SECN+	Valparaiso*	No. 16	Hawkins Field	**W** 12–0 (7)	**Fennell** (2–0)	Cottrill (0–1)	None	3,358	14–3		
March 14	SECN+	at No. 25 Auburn	No. 16	Plainsman Park; Auburn, AL	**L** 2–6	Dutton (3–1)	**Thompson** (2–1)	None	4,780	14–4	0–1	
March 15	SECN+	at No. 25 Auburn	No. 16	Plainsman Park	**W** 8–6	**Hawks** (3–0)	Tilly (2–1)	**Green** (4)	4,669	15–4	1–1	
March 16	SECN+	at No. 25 Auburn	No. 16	Plainsman Park	**L** 6–7	Alvarez (1–0)	**Green** (0–1)	Hetzler (1)	4,799	15–5	1–2	
March 18	SECN+	Belmont*	No. 22	Hawkins Field	**W** 13–2 (7)	**Nye** (1–0)	Brown (0–4)	None	3,802	16–5		
March 20	SECN	Texas A&M	No. 22	Hawkins Field	**W** 5–3	**Kranzler** (2–0)	Prager (2–1)	**Hawks (2)**	3,802	17–5	2–2	
March 21	SECN+	Texas A&M	No. 22	Hawkins Field	**W** 3–1	**O'Rourke** (2–0)	Lamkin (1–2)	**Green** (5)	3,802	18–5	3–2	
March 22	SECN+	Texas A&M	No. 22	Hawkins Field	**W** 8–5	**Kranzler** (3–0)	Moss (2–2)	**O'Rourke** (1)	3,802	19–5	4–2	
March 25	SECN+	Eastern Kentucky*	No. 14	Hawkins Field	**W** 10–0 (8)	**Huesman** (1–0)	Underhill (0–4)	None	3,802	20–5		
March 28	SECN	No. 2 Arkansas	No. 14	Hawkins Field	**L** 0–9	Root (4–1)	**Thompson** (2–2)	None	3,802	20–6	4–3	
March 29	SECN+	No. 2 Arkansas	No. 14	Hawkins Field	**L** 4–6 (10)	Jimenez (3–0)	**Green** (0–2)	None	3,802	20–7	4–4	
March 30	SECN+	No. 2 Arkansas	No. 14	Hawkins Field	**L** 3–7	Bybee (3–0)	**Kranzler** (3–1)	None	3,802	20–8	4–5	

April (12–5)
Date	TV	Opponent	Rank	Stadium	Score	Win	Loss	Save	Attendance	Overall	SEC	Source
April 1	SECN+	Western Kentucky	No. 23	Hawkins Field	**W** 5–4 (10)	**Kranzler** (4–0)	Jones (1–1)	None	3,802	21–8		
April 4	SECN+	at Florida	No. 23	Condron Family Ballpark; Gainesville, FL	**W** 6–0	**Green** (1–2)	Peterson (4–2)	**Hawks** (3)	5,659	22–8	5–5	
April 5	SECN+	at Florida	No. 23	Condron Family Ballpark	**W** 3–2	**Kranzler** (5–1)	Barlow (1–3)	**Fennell** (1)	5,639	23–8	6–5	
April 6	SECN	at Florida	No. 23	Condron Family Ballpark	**W** 11–3	**Shorey** (2–0)	Philpott (0–3)	**O'Rourke** (2)	5,546	24–8	7–5	
April 8	SECN+	Dayton*	No. 17	Hawkins Field	**W** 9–2	**McElvain** (1–2)	Heller (0–1)	None	3,243	25–8		
April 11	SECN	at No. 19 Oklahoma	No. 17	L. Dale Mitchell Baseball Park; Norman, OK	**L** 4–9	Crossland (2–2)	**Thompson** (2–3)	None	4,067	25–9	7–6	
April 12	SECN+	at No. 19 Oklahoma	No. 17	L. Dale Mitchell Baseball Park	**L** 0–14 (7)	Ky. Witherspoon (6–2)	**Bowker** (2–2)	None	5,051	25–10	7–7	
April 13	SECN+	at No. 19 Oklahoma	No. 17	L. Dale Mitchell Baseball Park	**W** 13–2 (7)	**Fennell** (3–0)	M. Witherspoon (2–4)	**Hawks** (4)	3,021	26–10	8–7	
April 15	SECN+	Lipscomb*	No. 19	Hawkins Field	**W** 5–4 (10)	**O'Rourke** (3–0)	Puckett (2–2)	None	3,802	27–10		
April 17	SECN+	No. 5 Georgia	No. 19	Hawkins Field	**W** 3–1	**Thompson** (3–3)	Curley (2–1)	**Hawks** (5)	3,802	28–10	9–7	
April 18	SECN+	No. 5 Georgia	No. 19	Hawkins Field	**W** 13–7	**Kranzler** (6–1)	Smith (3–2)	None	3,802	29–10	10–7	
April 19	SECN+	No. 5 Georgia	No. 19	Hawkins Field	**W** 5–2	**Fennell** (4–0)	Finley (2–1)	**Hawks** (6)	3,802	30–10	11–7	
April 22	SECN+	Middle Tennessee*	No. 9	Hawkins Field	**L** 3–5	Imbimbo (1–0)	**Seiber** (1–1)	None	3,550	30–11		
April 25	SECN+	at No. 23 Ole Miss	No. 9	Swayze Field; Oxford, MS	**L** 3–8	Hunter (6–2)	**Thompson** (3–4)	McCausland (2)	9,159	30–12	11–8	
April 26	SECN	at No. 23 Ole Miss	No. 9	Swayze Field	**L** 1–7	Maddox (5–3)	**Bowker** (2–3)	None	9,693	30–13	11–9	
April 27	SECN+	at No. 23 Ole Miss	No. 9	Swayze Field	**W** 13–0 (7)	**Fennell** (5–0)	Nichols (3–1)	None	9,111	31–13	12–9	
April 29	SECN+	Indiana State*	No. 15	Hawkins Field	**W** 5–2	**Nye** (2–0)	Spencer (0–2)	**Kranzler** (3)	3,521	32–13		

May (7–3)
Date	TV	Opponent	Rank	Stadium	Score	Win	Loss	Save	Attendance	Overall	SEC	Source
May 2	SECN+	No. 18 Alabama	No. 15	Hawkins Field	**W** 12–2 (8)	**Thompson** (4–4)	Fay (0–1)	None	3,802	33–13	13–9	
May 3	SECN+	No. 18 Alabama	No. 15	Hawkins Field	**L** 2–5	Quick (7–2)	**Bowker** (2–4)	Ozmer (14)	3,802	33–14	13–10	
May 4	SECN	No. 18 Alabama	No. 15	Hawkins Field	**W** 9–7	**Hawks** (4–0)	Ozmer (4–1)	None	3,802	34–14	14–10	
May 6	ACCN	at No. 20 Louisville*	No. 11	Jim Patterson Stadium; Louisville, KY	**L** 4–5	Tucker (3–0)	**McElvain** (1–3)	Schweitzer (1)	3,132	34–15		
May 9	SECN	at No. 15 Tennessee	No. 11	Lindsey Nelson Stadium; Knoxville, TN	**L** 2–3	Doyle (9–2)	**Thompson** (4–5)	Snead (5)	5,923	34–16	14–11	
May 10	ESPN2	at No. 15 Tennessee	No. 11	Lindsey Nelson Stadium	**W** 10–6	**Guth** (1–0)	Phillips (3–4)	None	6,329	35–16	15–11	
May 11	ESPN2	at No. 15 Tennessee	No. 11	Lindsey Nelson Stadium	**W** 7–5	**Guth** (2–0)	Franklin (1–2)	**McElvain** (1)	6,070	36–16	16–11	
May 15	SECN+	Kentucky	No. 9	Hawkins Field	**W** 8–7	**Guth** (3–0)	Gregersen (0–4)	None	3,802	37–16	17–11	
May 16	SECN+	Kentucky	No. 9	Hawkins Field	**W** 9–8	**McElvain** (2–3)	McCoy (1–1)	None	3,802	38–16	18–11	
May 17	SECN+	Kentucky	No. 9	Hawkins Field	**W** 5–3	**Fennell** (6–0)	Gregersen (0–5)	None	3,802	39–16	19–11	

Postseason (3–0)

SEC tournament (3–0)
Date	TV	Opponent	Rank	Stadium	Score	Win	Loss	Save	Attendance	Overall	SECT Record	Source
May 22	SECN	vs. (12) Oklahoma	(4) No. 9	Hoover Metropolitan Stadium; Hoover, AL	**W** 6–1	**Thompson** (5–5)	Crossland (4–5)	None	10,135	40–16	1–0	Report
May 24	SECN	vs. (8) No. 21 Tennessee	(4) No. 9	Hoover Metropolitan Stadium	**W** 10–0 (7)	**Bowker** (3–4)	Kuhns (2–4)	**Fennell** (1)		41–16	2–0	Report
May 25	ESPN2	vs. (7) No. 17 Ole Miss	(4) No. 9	Hoover Metropolitan Stadium	**W** 3–2	**Guth** (4–0)	Hooks (1–1)	**Hawks** (1)	13,518	42–16	3–0	Report

Nashville Regional (1–2)
Date	TV	Opponent	Rank	Stadium	Score	Win	Loss	Save	Attendance	Overall	NCAA record	Source
May 30	SECN	(4) Wright State	(1) No. 2	Hawkins Field	**W** 4–3	**Thompson** (6–5)	Hartzell (6–3)	**Hawks** (8)	3,802	43–16	1–0	Report
May 31	ESPN2	(2) Louisville	(1) No. 2	Hawkins Field	**L** 2–3	West (2–2)	**Bowker** (3–5)	Schweitzer (3)	3,802	43–17	1–1	Report
June 1	SECN	(4) Wright State	(1) No. 2	Hawkins Field	**L** 4–5	Paige (2–3)	**Nye** (2–1)	Whitesell (1)	3,802	43–18	1–2	

Legend: = Win = Loss = Canceled
Bold = Vanderbilt team member * Non-conference game
Rankings are based on the team's current ranking in the D1Baseball poll.

== Record vs. conference opponents ==
Blank are not scheduled. Blue are home games, otherwise away.

2025 SEC baseball records Source: 2025 SEC baseball game results, 2025 SEC baseball schedule
Tm	W–L	ALA	ARK	AUB	FLA	UGA	KEN	LSU	MSU	MIZ	OKL	OMS	SCA	TEN	TEX	TAM	VAN	Tm	SR	SW
ALA	16–14		.	1–2	1–2	2–1	.	1–2	1–2	3–0	2–1	.	.	1–2	.	3–0	1–2	ALA	4–6	2–0
ARK	20–10	.		.	1–2	1–2	.	1–2	.	3–0	.	2–1	3–0	2–1	3–0	1–2	3–0	ARK	6–4	4–0
AUB	17–13	2–1	.		.	0–3	2–1	3–0	2–1	.	.	1–2	3–0	2–1	0–3	.	2–1	AUB	7–3	2–2
FLA	15–15	2–1	2–1	.		0–3	.	.	2–1	3–0	.	1–2	3–0	0–3	2–1	.	0–3	FLA	6–4	2–3
UGA	18–12	1–2	2–1	3–0	3–0		2–1	.	.	3–0	2–1	.	.	.	0–3	2–1	0–3	UGA	7–3	3–2
KEN	13–17	.	.	1–2	.	1–2		.	0–3	.	3–0	1–2	2–1	2–1	1–2	2–1	0–3	KEN	4–6	1–2
LSU	19–11	2–1	2–1	0–3	.	.	.		3–0	3–0	3–0	.	2–1	2–1	1–2	1–2	.	LSU	7–3	3–1
MSU	15–15	2–1	.	1–2	1–2	.	3–0	0–3		3–0	1–2	2–1	2–1	.	0–3	.	.	MSU	5–5	2–2
MIZ	3–27	0–3	0–3	.	0–3	0–3	.	0–3	0–3		0–3	0–3	.	.	0–3	3–0	.	MIZ	1–9	1–9
OKL	14–16	1–2	.	.	.	1–2	0–3	0–3	2–1	3–0		2–1	2–1	.	1–2	.	2–1	OKL	5–5	1–2
OMS	16–14	.	1–2	2–1	2–1	.	2–1	.	1–2	3–0	1–2		1–2	1–2	.	.	2–1	OMS	5–5	1–0
SCA	6–24	.	0–3	0–3	0–3	.	1–2	1–2	1–2	.	1–2	2–1		0–3	.	0–3	.	SCA	1–9	0–5
TEN	16–14	2–1	1–2	1–2	3–0	.	1–2	1–2	.	.	.	2–1	3–0		.	1–2	1–2	TEN	4–6	2–0
TEX	22–8	.	0–3	3–0	1–2	3–0	2–1	2–1	3–0	3–0	2–1	.	.	.		3–0	.	TEX	8–2	5–1
TAM	11–19	0–3	2–1	.	.	1–2	1–2	2–1	.	0–3	.	.	3–0	2–1	0–3		0–3	TAM	4–6	1–4
VAN	19–11	2–1	0–3	1–2	3–0	3–0	3–0	.	.	.	1–2	1–2	.	2–1	.	3–0		VAN	6–4	4–1
Tm	W–L	ALA	ARK	AUB	FLA	UGA	KEN	LSU	MSU	MIZ	OKL	OMS	SCA	TEN	TEX	TAM	VAN	Team	SR	SW

Updated for entire regular season.
Tie brkrs: LSU>VAN ARK common, OMS>TEN & OMS>ALA VAN common, TEN>ALA hd to hd, FLA>MSU hd to hd.

== Rankings ==
Ranking movements Legend: ██ Increase in ranking ██ Decrease in ranking — = Not ranked ( ) = First-place votes
	Week																		
Poll	Pre	1	2	3	4	5	6	7	8	9	10	11	12	13	14	15	16	17	Final
Coaches'	18	18*	12	18	14	19	13	20	14	17	10	15	10	9	9	4 (10)			
Baseball America	15	13	13	17	14	18	14	16	15	19	8	14	11	10	10	10*			
NCBWA†	14	14	14	12	13	14	12	17	14	19	15	16	16	11	9	3			
D1Baseball	16	15	14	18	16	22	14	23	17	19	9	15	11	9	9	2			
Perfect Game	15	15	14	17	14	20	13	21	21	—	19	25	14	11	10	10*			

† NCBWA ranks 30 teams in their preseason poll, but only ranks 25 teams weekly during the season.
* A new poll was not released for this week, so for comparison purposes, the previous week's ranking is inserted in this week's slot.
