= Tre Phelps =

American baseball player (born 2004)

- Phelps in 2026

Pittsburgh Pirates
- Third baseman
- Born: June 19, 2004 (age 22); Atlanta, Georgia, U.S.
- Bats: Right Throws: Right
- Stats at Baseball Reference

Edward Charles "Tre" Phelps III (born June 19, 2004) is an American professional baseball third baseman in the Pittsburgh Pirates organization.

== Amateur career ==
Phelps attended Georgia Premier Academy in Statesboro, Georgia. As a senior, he batted .275 with one home run and 25 RBI in 37 games. Following his high school career, he committed to play college baseball at the University of Georgia.

As a true freshman with the Bulldogs in 2024, Phelps made an immediate impact, batting .353 with 12 home runs and 40 RBIs. Following the season, he was named a second-team Freshman All-American by the National Collegiate Baseball Writers Association (NCBWA) and earned Freshman All-SEC honors. During his sophomore season in 2025, Phelps batted .318 with 14 doubles, 10 home runs, and 44 RBIs. After the season, he announced that he would return to Georgia for his junior year instead of declaring for the 2025 Major League Baseball draft. Phelps began the 2026 season with a strong start offensively, emerging as one of Georgia's leading hitters. At the end of the regular season, Phelps earned All-SEC First Team and SEC All-Defensive Team honors. During Georgia's third game of the Athens Regional, Phelps hit a go-ahead home run against Liberty to give the Bulldogs the lead. He was subsequently ejected for excessive celebration following the home run and received a one-game suspension, forcing him to miss Georgia's opener against Mississippi State in the Athens Super Regional.

== Professional career ==
Phelps was selected by the Pittsburgh Pirates in the ninth round of the 2026 Major League Baseball draft and signed with the team on July 17, 2026.
