= 2025 Alabama Crimson Tide baseball team =

American college baseball season

2025 Alabama Crimson Tide baseball

Hattiesburg Regional, 0–2
- Conference: Southeastern Conference

Ranking
- Coaches: No. 20
- D1Baseball.com: No. 24
- Record: 41–18 (16–14 SEC)
- Head coach: Rob Vaughn (2nd season)
- Associate head coach: Jason Jackson (8th season)
- Assistant coaches: Mike Morrison (2nd season); Anthony Papio (2nd season)
- Captain: Kade Snell
- Home stadium: Sewell–Thomas Stadium

2025 Southeastern Conference baseball standings
	Conf.				Overall
Team	W		L	PCT	W		L	PCT
No. 17 Texas ‍†‍‍^{y}	22	–	8	.733	44	–	14	.759
No. 3 Arkansas ‍‍‍^{y}	20	–	10	.667	50	–	15	.769
No. 1 LSU ‍‍‍^{y}	19	–	11	.633	53	–	15	.779
No. 18 Vanderbilt ‍‍‡‍^{y}	19	–	11	.633	43	–	18	.705
No. 19 Georgia ‍‍‍^{y}	18	–	12	.600	43	–	17	.717
No. 11 Auburn ‍‍‍^{y}	17	–	13	.567	41	–	20	.672
No. 21 Ole Miss ‍‍‍^{y}	16	–	14	.533	43	–	21	.672
No. 12 Tennessee ‍‍‍^{y}	16	–	14	.533	46	–	19	.708
Alabama ‍‍‍^{y}	16	–	14	.533	41	–	18	.695
Florida ‍‍‍^{y}	15	–	15	.500	39	–	22	.639
Mississippi State ‍‍‍^{y}	15	–	15	.500	36	–	23	.610
Oklahoma ‍‍‍^{y}	14	–	16	.467	38	–	22	.633
Kentucky ‍‍‍^{y}	13	–	17	.433	31	–	26	.544
Texas A&M ‍‍‍	11	–	19	.367	30	–	26	.536
South Carolina ‍‍‍	6	–	24	.200	28	–	29	.491
Missouri ‍‍‍	3	–	27	.100	16	–	39	.291
† – Conference champion ‡ – Tournament champion y – Invited to the NCAA Tournament; As of June 22, 2025; Rankings from D1Baseball

The 2025 Alabama Crimson Tide baseball team represented the University of Alabama during the 2025 NCAA Division I baseball season. The Crimson Tide played their home games at Sewell–Thomas Stadium, and were under second year head coach Rob Vaughn.

== Previous season ==
The 2024 Crimson Tide team finished with a 33–24 overall record and a SEC record of 13–17. Despite a losing conference record and an early SEC tournament exit, Alabama received an at-large berth into the 2024 NCAA Division I baseball tournament. There, the Crimson Tide went 0–2 in the Tallahassee Regional, losing to UCF in the opening game, and then losing to Stetson in the elimination game.

== Preseason ==
=== Preseason SEC awards and honors ===
Preseason awards will be announced in January or February 2025.

Preseason All-SEC Team
Player	No.	Position	Team	Class
Justin Lebron	xx	SS	First	class
Will Hodo	xx	DH/UTL	First	class
Zane Adams	8	SP	First	class

- SEC Preseason Freshman of the Year: Derek Curiel, UTL

=== SEC coaches poll ===
The SEC Coaches poll was released on February 2, 2025. Alabama was predicted to finish thirteenth in the SEC.

SEC coaches poll
Predicted finish	Team	Votes (1st place)
1	Texas A&M	228 (10)
2	Tennessee	215 (1)
3	Arkansas	214 (3)
4	LSU	204 (1)
5	Florida	183 (1)
6	Georgia	165
7	Vanderbilt	156
8	Texas	146
9	Mississippi State	112
10	Kentucky	102
11	Oklahoma	101
12	Auburn	100
13	Alabama	98
14	South Carolina	61
15	Ole Miss	60
16	Missouri	31

== Personnel ==
=== Starters ===
Lineup
Pos.	No.	Player.	Year
C	10	Bradley Neal	Junior
1B	32	Jason Torres	Junior
2B	21	Brennan Norton	Senior
3B	27	Garrett Staton	RS Senior
SS	1	Justin Lebron	Sophomore
LF	3	Kade Snell	RS Senior
CF	5	Richie Bolomolo, Jr.	Junior
RF	9	Bryce Fowler	RS Junior
DH	18	Will Hodo	Senior

Weekend pitching rotation
Day	No.	Player.	Year
Friday	20	Zane Adams	Sophomore
Saturday	4	Riley Quick	RS Sophomore
Sunday	48	Bobby Alcock	RS Senior

=== Roster ===
2025 Alabama Crimson Tide baseball team
Players
Coaches

#	Pos.	Name	B/T	Height	Weight	Year	Home town
1	INF	Justin Lebron	R/R	6 ft 2 in (1.88 m)	180 lb (82 kg)	So	Miramar, FL
3	OF	Kade Snell	L/L	6 ft 1 in (1.85 m)	210 lb (95 kg)	RS Sr	Dothan, AL
4	RHP	Riley Quick	R/R	6 ft 6 in (1.98 m)	245 lb (111 kg)	RS So	Trussville, AL
5	OF	Richie Bonomolo Jr.	R/R	5 ft 11 in (1.8 m)	200 lb (91 kg)	Jr	The Bronx, NY
6	LHP	Beau Bryans	R/L	6 ft 0 in (1.83 m)	195 lb (88 kg)	Jr	Madison, MS
7	LHP	Matthew Heiberger	L/L	6 ft 3 in (1.91 m)	210 lb (95 kg)	So	Birmingham, AL
8	RHP	Tyler Fay	R/R	6 ft 5 in (1.96 m)	215 lb (98 kg)	RS So	Doniphan, NE
9	OF	Bryce Fowler	L/L	6 ft 2 in (1.88 m)	190 lb (86 kg)	RS Jr	Madison, MS
10	C	Brady Neal	L/R	5 ft 10 in (1.78 m)	190 lb (86 kg)	Jr	Tallahassee, FL
11	RHP	Coulson Buchanan	R/R	5 ft 10 in (1.78 m)	185 lb (84 kg)	Sr	Sugar Hill, GA
12	RHP	JT Blackwood	R/R	6 ft 2 in (1.88 m)	210 lb (95 kg)	Jr	Cullman, AL
13	C	Luke Vaughn	R/R	6 ft 2 in (1.88 m)	200 lb (91 kg)	So	Cincinnati, OH
14	RHP	Carson Ozmer	R/R	6 ft 2 in (1.88 m)	210 lb (95 kg)	Gr	Lantana, TX
15	OF	Coleman Mizell	L/L	6 ft 3 in (1.91 m)	230 lb (104 kg)	So	Hartselle, AL
16	RHP	Jonathan Stevens	R/R	6 ft 1 in (1.85 m)	215 lb (98 kg)	So	Birmingham, AL
17	C	Will Plattner	R/R	6 ft 1 in (1.85 m)	205 lb (93 kg)	Jr	Springfield, IL
18	INF	Will Hodo	L/R	6 ft 3 in (1.91 m)	225 lb (102 kg)	Sr	Waynesboro, MS
19	RHP	Aeden Finateri	R/R	6 ft 0 in (1.83 m)	235 lb (107 kg)	Sr	Watertown, CT
20	LHP	Zane Adams	L/L	6 ft 4 in (1.93 m)	195 lb (88 kg)	So	Porter, TX
21	INF	Brennen Norton	R/R	5 ft 9 in (1.75 m)	195 lb (88 kg)	Sr	Cullman, AL
22	RHP	Braylon Myers	L/R	6 ft 2 in (1.88 m)	205 lb (93 kg)	Sr	Bessemer, AL
23	RHP	Aidan Moza	L/R	6 ft 1 in (1.85 m)	195 lb (88 kg)	Sr	Dallas, GA
24	LHP	Tate Robertson	L/L	6 ft 0 in (1.83 m)	170 lb (77 kg)	Sr	Tuscaloosa, AL
26	OF	Peyton Steele	R/R	6 ft 1 in (1.85 m)	195 lb (88 kg)	Fr	Decatur, AL
27	INF	Garrett Staton	R/R	6 ft 0 in (1.83 m)	195 lb (88 kg)	RS Sr	Gainesville, GA
29	RHP	Danny Heintz	R/R	6 ft 6 in (1.98 m)	235 lb (107 kg)	RS Sr	Morrsville, NC
30	RHP	Anthony Pesci	L/R	6 ft 4 in (1.93 m)	205 lb (93 kg)	Fr	Commerce Township, MI
31	INF	Jon Young Jr.	L/R	6 ft 1 in (1.85 m)	190 lb (86 kg)	Fr	Cherry Hill, NJ
32	INF	Jason Torres	R/R	6 ft 1 in (1.85 m)	230 lb (104 kg)	Jr	Hialeah, FL
33	UTL	Ariston Veasey	R/R	6 ft 1 in (1.85 m)	190 lb (86 kg)	So	Tyrone, GA
36	RHP	Hagan Banks	R/R	6 ft 4 in (1.93 m)	215 lb (98 kg)	RS Jr	Plainville, GA
37	INF	Andre Modugno	R/R	6 ft 5 in (1.96 m)	220 lb (100 kg)	Fr	Upper Saddle River, NJ
38	RHP	Zach Kittrell	R/R	6 ft 0 in (1.83 m)	195 lb (88 kg)	Jr	Saraland, AL
39	RHP	Sam Mitchell	R/R	6 ft 7 in (2.01 m)	235 lb (107 kg)	So	Madison, AL
40	INF	Sean Griggs	L/R	6 ft 2 in (1.88 m)	195 lb (88 kg)	Fr	Wall, NJ
41	LHP	Connor Ball	L/L	6 ft 0 in (1.83 m)	180 lb (82 kg)	RS Jr	Sterrett, AL
42	OF	Ahmaad Duff	R/R	5 ft 7 in (1.7 m)	155 lb (70 kg)	Fr	Indianapolis, IN
43	RHP	Jack Ketchum	R/R	6 ft 3 in (1.91 m)	210 lb (95 kg)	Fr	West Point, MS
44	RHP	Packy Bradley-Cooney	R/R	6 ft 2 in (1.88 m)	210 lb (95 kg)	Sr	Woburn, MA
45	RHP	Jackson Hunter	R/R	6 ft 3 in (1.91 m)	190 lb (86 kg)	Fr	Meridianville, AL
46	LHP	Carson Kuehne	L/L	6 ft 5 in (1.96 m)	195 lb (88 kg)	Fr	Kentfield, CA
47	INF	JoJo Williamson	L/R	5 ft 8 in (1.73 m)	175 lb (79 kg)	Fr	Hartselle, AL
48	RHP	Bobby Alcock	R/R	6 ft 5 in (1.96 m)	230 lb (104 kg)	RS Sr	Lynn, MA
49	RHP	Nash Wagner	R/R	6 ft 5 in (1.96 m)	225 lb (102 kg)	Fr	Zionsville, IN
50	LHP	Connor Lehman	L/L	6 ft 2 in (1.88 m)	210 lb (95 kg)	Fr	Indian Mound, TN
52	RHP	Ashton Alston	R/R	6 ft 6 in (1.98 m)	205 lb (93 kg)	Fr	Gallatin, TN
67	RHP	Egan Lowery	L/R	6 ft 1 in (1.85 m)	184 lb (83 kg)	So	McCalla, AL
99	RHP	Austin Morris	R/R	6 ft 4 in (1.93 m)	210 lb (95 kg)	RS So	Warrior, AL

Head coach

Rob Vaughn

Assistant coach(es)

Jason Jackson
Mike Morrison
Anthony Papio

Legend

- (C) Team captain
- (S) Suspended
- (I) Ineligible
- Injured
- Current redshirt

Roster
Last update: February 21, 2025

=== Coaching and support staff ===
2025 Alabama Crimson Tide baseball coaching staff
Name	Position	Seasons at Bama	Alma mater
Rob Vaughn	Head coach	2	Kansas State University (2009)
Jason Jackson	Associate Head Coach	8	Florida State University (2000)
Mike Morrison	Assistant Coach	2	Coastal Carolina University (2016)
Anthony Papio	Assistant Coach	2	University of Maryland, College Park (2016)
Sean Stryker	Athletic Trainer	8	Pennsylvania State University (2012)
Brett Price	Associate Strength and Conditioning Coach	1	Troy University (2013)
Mikey White	Coordinator, Player Development	2	University of Alabama (2021)
Jenny Sanders	Director of Baseball Operations	5	University of Alabama (2016)
Stephanie Godfrey	Assistant Director, Baseball Athletics Student Services
Amanda Branson	Director, Baseball Performance Nutrition
Jessica Paré	Deputy Director of Athletics, Baseball Oversight	16	University of Connecticut (2006)
Garrett Wood	Recruiting Operations Assistant	2	University of Mississippi (2022)

== Game log ==
2025 Alabama Crimson Tide baseball game log (41–18)
Regular season (40–15)

February (10–0)
Date	Opponent	Rank	Site/stadium	Score	Win	Loss	Save	TV	Attendance	Overall record	SEC record
February 14	Bradley*		Sewell–Thomas Stadium; Tuscaloosa, AL	**W** 10–6	**Adams** (1–0)	Lutz (0–1)	**Ozmer** (1)	SECN+	4,171	1–0	—
February 15	Bradley*		Sewell–Thomas Stadium	**W** 19–3	**Quick** (1–0)	Politte (0–1)	None	SECN+	3,279	2–0	—
February 16	Bradley*		Sewell–Thomas Stadium	**W** 11–4^{8}	**Alcock** (1–0)	Marks (0–1)	None	SECN+	3,311	3–0	—
February 18	Middle Tennessee*		Sewell–Thomas Stadium	**W** 12–2^{8}	**Blackwood** (1–0)	Jenkins (0–1)	None	SECN+	3,180	4–0	—
February 19	Alabama State*		Sewell–Thomas Stadium	**W** 15–1^{7}	**Kittrell** (1–0)	Power (0–1)	None	SECN+	2,885	5–0	—
Jacksonville Classic
February 21	vs. Coastal Carolina*		VyStar Ballpark; Jacksonville, FL	**W** 9–2	**Adams** (2–0)	McKay (0–1)	None	D1B+	2,020	6–0	—
February 22	vs. No. 12 NC State*		VyStar Ballpark	**W** 4–0	**Quick** (2–0)	Andrews (1–1)	**Ozmer** (2)	D1B+	2,719	7–0	—
February 23	vs. Ohio State*		VyStar Ballpark	**W** 12–10	**Robertson** (1–0)	Copenhaver (0–2)	None	D1B+	2,611	8–0	—
February 25	Jacksonville State*		Sewell–Thomas Stadium	**W** 20–11	**Blackwood** (2–0)	Thomas (1–1)	None	SECN+	4,007	9–0	—
February 28	North Dakota State*		Sewell–Thomas Stadium	**W** 12–4	**Myers** (1–0)	Johnson (0–3)	None	SECN+	4,180	10–0	—

March (15–4)
Date	Opponent	Rank	Site/stadium	Score	Win	Loss	Save	TV	Attendance	Overall record	SEC record
March 1	North Dakota State*		Sewell–Thomas Stadium	**W** 9–7	**Quick** (3–0)	Knight (0–2)	**Ozmer** (3)	SECN+	4,019	11–0	—
March 2	North Dakota State*		Sewell–Thomas Stadium	**W** 11–3	**Alcock** (2–0)	Martin (0–2)	None	SECN+	3,419	12–0	—
March 4	at Jacksonville State*	No. 23	Rudy Abbott Field; Jacksonville, AL	**W** 11–1	**Myers** (2–0)	Knight (1–1)	None	ESPN+	834	13–0	—
March 5	No. 19 Troy*	No. 23	Sewell–Thomas Stadium	**W** 3–1	**Heiberger** (1–0)	Falinski (0–1)	**Ozmer** (4)	SECN+	2,990	14–0	—
March 7	Presbyterian*	No. 23	Sewell–Thomas Stadium	**W** 10–0^{7}	**Adams** (3–0)	Mueller (0–2)	None	SECN+	3,367	15–0	—
March 8	Presbyterian*	No. 23	Sewell–Thomas Stadium	**W** 15–1^{7}	**Quick** (4–0)	McGregor (1–2)	None	SECN+	3,368	16–0	—
March 9	Presbyterian*	No. 23	Sewell–Thomas Stadium	**L** 8–11	Hollister (2–1)	**Heiberger** (1–1)	None	SECN+	3,021	16–1	—
March 11	at UAB*	No. 17	Regions Field; Birmingham, AL	**W** 6–3	**Bryans** (1–0)	Olson (2–1)	**Ozmer** (5)	ESPN+	2,528	17–1	—
March 14	at No. 19 Texas A&M	No. 17	Olsen Field at Blue Bell Park; College Station, TX	**W** 6–4	**Ozmer** (1–0)	Rudis (0–1)	None	SECN+	6,917	18–1	1–0
March 15	at No. 19 Texas A&M	No. 17	Olsen Field at Blue Bell Park	**W** 6–2	**Heiberger** (2–1)	Wilson (0–1)	None	SECN+	6,929	19–1	2–0
March 16	at No. 19 Texas A&M	No. 17	Olsen Field at Blue Bell Park	**W** 2–0	**Alcock** (3–0)	Myles (2–2)	**Myers** (1)	SECN	6,864	20–1	3–0
March 18	South Alabama*	No. 12	Sewell–Thomas Stadium	**W** 6–5^{10}	**Morris** (1–0)	Garmon (1–3)	None	SECN+	3,899	21–1	—
Alabama–Tennessee Series
March 20	No. 1 Tennessee	No. 12	Sewell–Thomas Stadium	**W** 6–5	**Adams** (4–0)	Doyle (3–1)	**Ozmer** (6)	ESPNU	4,341	22–1	4–0
March 21	No. 1 Tennessee	No. 12	Sewell–Thomas Stadium	**L** 7–10	Loy (4–0)	**Quick** (4–1)	Franklin (2)	SECN+	5,800	22–2	4–1
March 22	No. 1 Tennessee	No. 12	Sewell–Thomas Stadium	**L** 2–9	Krenzel (1–0)	**Alcock** (3–1)	None	SECN+	5,800	22–3	4–2
March 25	vs. North Alabama*	No. 12	Toyota Field; Madison, AL	**W** 4–3	**Ozmer** (2–0)	Howard (0–1)	None		5,931	23–3	—
March 28	No. 9 Oklahoma	No. 12	Sewell–Thomas Stadium	**W** 8–6	**Ozmer** (3–0)	Bodin (2–1)	None	SECN	5,179	24–3	5–2
March 29	No. 9 Oklahoma	No. 12	Sewell–Thomas Stadium	**L** 5–6	Hensley (3–0)	**Banks** (0–1)	Crooks (8)	SECN	4,062	24–4	5–3
March 30	No. 9 Oklahoma	No. 12	Sewell–Thomas Stadium	**W** 8–6	**Finateri** (1–0)	M. Witherspoon (2–2)	**Ozmer** (7)	SECN+	3,625	25–4	6–3

April (10–6)
Date	Opponent	Rank	Site/stadium	Score	Win	Loss	Save	TV	Attendance	Overall record	SEC record
April 1	Samford*	No. 8	Sewell–Thomas Stadium	**W** 11–9	**Buchanan** (1–0)	Rice (0–3)	**Ozmer** (8)	SECN+	3,883	26–4	—
Iron Series
April 4	at No. 16 Auburn	No. 8	Plainsman Park; Auburn, AL	**L** 0–10^{7}	Dutton (4–2)	**Adams** (4–1)	None	SECN+	6,729	26–5	6–4
April 5 (DH-1)	at No. 16 Auburn	No. 8	Plainsman Park	**W** 6–5	**Morris** (2–0)	Myers (0–1)	**Ozmer** (9)	SECN+		27–5	7–4
April 5 (DH-2)	at No. 16 Auburn	No. 8	Plainsman Park	**L** 5–7	Graves (2–1)	**Alcock** (3–2)	Hetzler (3)	SECN	5,603	27–6	7–5
April 8	No. 23 Southern Miss*	No. 12	Sewell–Thomas Stadium	**W** 10–6	**Heiberger** (3–1)	Sivley (2–1)	**Ozmer** (10)	SECN+	3,821	28–6	—
April 11	Mississippi State	No. 12	Sewell–Thomas Stadium	**L** 3–13^{8}	Simmons (3–1)	**Adams** (4–2)	None	SECN+	4,882	28–7	7–6
April 12	Mississippi State	No. 12	Sewell–Thomas Stadium	**W** 4–1	**Quick** (5–1)	Siary (0–1)	**Ozmer** (11)	SECN+	5,800	29–7	8–6
April 13	Mississippi State	No. 12	Sewell–Thomas Stadium	**L** 2–4	Williams (1–2)	**Myers** (2–1)	None	SECN+	4,619	29–8	8–7
April 15	UAB*	No. 15	Sewell–Thomas Stadium	**W** 5–3	**Finateri** (2–0)	Warrick (2–2)	**Ozmer** (12)	SECN+	3,883	30–8	—
April 17	at No. 9 LSU	No. 15	Alex Box Stadium; Baton Rouge, LA	**L** 6–11	Evans (2–0)	**Blackwood** (2–1)	Cowan (5)	SECN+	11,654	30–9	8–8
April 18	at No. 9 LSU	No. 15	Alex Box Stadium	**L** 3–4	Eyanson (6–1)	**Quick** (5–2)	Cowan (6)	SECN+	12,278	30–10	8–9
April 19	at No. 9 LSU	No. 15	Alex Box Stadium	**W** 7–4	**Adams** (5–2)	Ware (4–1)	**Ozmer** (13)	SEC Network	11,833	31–10	9–9
April 22	at Samford*	No. 18	Joe Lee Griffin Stadium; Birmingham, AL	**W** 11–7	**Morris** (3–0)	Sanders (1–1)	None		913	32–10	—
April 24	Missouri	No. 18	Sewell–Thomas Stadium	**W** 7–5	**Ozmer** (4–0)	Green (1–2)	None	SECN	3,534	33–10	10–9
April 25	Missouri	No. 18	Sewell–Thomas Stadium	**W** 7–3	**Quick** (6–2)	Libbert (2–3)	**Myers (2)**	SECN+	3,731	34–10	11–9
April 26	Missouri	No. 18	Sewell–Thomas Stadium	**W** 12–1^{7}	**Adams** (6–2)	Horn (0–1)	None	SECN+	4,062	35–10	12–9

May (5–5)
Date	Opponent	Rank	Site/stadium	Score	Win	Loss	Save	TV	Attendance	Overall record	SEC record
May 2	at No. 15 Vanderbilt	No. 18	Hawkins Field; Nashville, TN	**L** 2–12^{8}	Thompson (4–4)	**Fay** (0–1)	None	SECN+	3,802	35–11	12–10
May 3	at No. 15 Vanderbilt	No. 18	Hawkins Field	**W** 5–2	**Quick** (7–2)	Bowker (2–4)	**Ozmer** (14)	SECN+	3,802	36–11	13–10
May 4	at No. 15 Vanderbilt	No. 18	Hawkins Field	**L** 7–9	Hawks (4–0)	**Ozmer** (4–1)	None	SEC Network	3,802	36–12	13–11
May 6	at No. 19 Troy*	No. 23	Riddle–Pace Field; Troy, AL	**W** 10–2	**Finateri** (3–0)	Roettgen (1–1)	None	ESPN+	3,892	37–12	—
May 9 (DH 1)	No. 6 Georgia	No. 23	Sewell–Thomas Stadium	**L** 3–19^{7}	Curley (4–2)	**Fay** (0–2)	None	SECN+		37–13	13–12
May 11 (DH 1)	No. 6 Georgia	No. 23	Sewell–Thomas Stadium	**W** 9–3	**Myers** (3–1)	Smith (4–3)	**Ozmer** (15)	SECN+	3,987	38–13	14–12
May 11 (DH 2)	No. 6 Georgia	No. 23	Sewell–Thomas Stadium	**W** 5–4^{7}	**Adams** (7–2)	Finley (2–2)	**Ozmer** (16)	SEC Network	3,329	39–13	15–12
May 15	at No. 23 Florida	No. 18	Condron Ballpark; Gainesville, FL	**L** 6–7	McNeillie (5–2)	**Blackwood** (2–2)	Clemente (7)	SECN+	5,881	39–14	15–13
May 16	at No. 23 Florida	No. 18	Condron Ballpark	**W** 9–6	**Quick** (8–2)	Barlow (1–4)	None	SECN+	6,199	40–14	16–13
May 17	at No. 23 Florida	No. 18	Condron Ballpark	**L** 3–9	King (6–2)	**Adams** (7–3)	None	SECN+	6,595	40–15	16–14

Postseason (1–3)

SEC Tournament (1–1)
Date	Opponent	Seed	Site/stadium	Score	Win	Loss	Save	TV	Attendance	Overall record	SECT Record
May 20	vs. (16) Missouri	(9) No. 23	Hoover Metropolitan Stadium; Hoover, AL	**W** 4–1	**Fay** (1–2)	Libbert (3–4)	**Ozmer** (17)	SECN	6,525	41–15	1–0
May 21	vs. (8) No. 21 Tennessee	(9) No. 23	Hoover Metropolitan Stadium	**L** 10–15	Russell (2–1)	**Adams** (7–4)	**Blackwood** (1)	SECN	11,117	41–16	1–1

Hattiesburg Regional (0–2)
Date	Opponent	Seed	Site/stadium	Score	Win	Loss	Save	TV	Attendance	Overall record	NCAA Record
May 30	vs. (3) Miami (FL)	(2) No. 23	Pete Taylor Park; Hattiesburg, MS	**L** 3–5	Ciscar (6–1)	**Quick** (8–4)	Walters (9)	ESPN2	5,329	41–17	0–1
May 31	at (1) No. 12 Southern Miss	(2) No. 23	Pete Taylor Park	**L** 5–6	Allen (7–4)	**Ozmer** (4–2)	None	ESPN2	5,329	41–18	0–2

Legend: = Win = Loss = Canceled
Bold = Alabama team member * = Non-conference game
Rankings are based on the team's current ranking in the D1Baseball poll.

== Record vs. conference opponents ==
Blank are not scheduled. Blue are home games, otherwise away.

2025 SEC baseball records Source: 2025 SEC baseball game results, 2025 SEC baseball schedule
Tm	W–L	ALA	ARK	AUB	FLA	UGA	KEN	LSU	MSU	MIZ	OKL	OMS	SCA	TEN	TEX	TAM	VAN	Tm	SR	SW
ALA	16–14		.	1–2	1–2	2–1	.	1–2	1–2	3–0	2–1	.	.	1–2	.	3–0	1–2	ALA	4–6	2–0
ARK	20–10	.		.	1–2	1–2	.	1–2	.	3–0	.	2–1	3–0	2–1	3–0	1–2	3–0	ARK	6–4	4–0
AUB	17–13	2–1	.		.	0–3	2–1	3–0	2–1	.	.	1–2	3–0	2–1	0–3	.	2–1	AUB	7–3	2–2
FLA	15–15	2–1	2–1	.		0–3	.	.	2–1	3–0	.	1–2	3–0	0–3	2–1	.	0–3	FLA	6–4	2–3
UGA	18–12	1–2	2–1	3–0	3–0		2–1	.	.	3–0	2–1	.	.	.	0–3	2–1	0–3	UGA	7–3	3–2
KEN	13–17	.	.	1–2	.	1–2		.	0–3	.	3–0	1–2	2–1	2–1	1–2	2–1	0–3	KEN	4–6	1–2
LSU	19–11	2–1	2–1	0–3	.	.	.		3–0	3–0	3–0	.	2–1	2–1	1–2	1–2	.	LSU	7–3	3–1
MSU	15–15	2–1	.	1–2	1–2	.	3–0	0–3		3–0	1–2	2–1	2–1	.	0–3	.	.	MSU	5–5	2–2
MIZ	3–27	0–3	0–3	.	0–3	0–3	.	0–3	0–3		0–3	0–3	.	.	0–3	3–0	.	MIZ	1–9	1–9
OKL	14–16	1–2	.	.	.	1–2	0–3	0–3	2–1	3–0		2–1	2–1	.	1–2	.	2–1	OKL	5–5	1–2
OMS	16–14	.	1–2	2–1	2–1	.	2–1	.	1–2	3–0	1–2		1–2	1–2	.	.	2–1	OMS	5–5	1–0
SCA	6–24	.	0–3	0–3	0–3	.	1–2	1–2	1–2	.	1–2	2–1		0–3	.	0–3	.	SCA	1–9	0–5
TEN	16–14	2–1	1–2	1–2	3–0	.	1–2	1–2	.	.	.	2–1	3–0		.	1–2	1–2	TEN	4–6	2–0
TEX	22–8	.	0–3	3–0	1–2	3–0	2–1	2–1	3–0	3–0	2–1	.	.	.		3–0	.	TEX	8–2	5–1
TAM	11–19	0–3	2–1	.	.	1–2	1–2	2–1	.	0–3	.	.	3–0	2–1	0–3		0–3	TAM	4–6	1–4
VAN	19–11	2–1	0–3	1–2	3–0	3–0	3–0	.	.	.	1–2	1–2	.	2–1	.	3–0		VAN	6–4	4–1
Tm	W–L	ALA	ARK	AUB	FLA	UGA	KEN	LSU	MSU	MIZ	OKL	OMS	SCA	TEN	TEX	TAM	VAN	Team	SR	SW

Updated for entire regular season.
Tie brkrs: LSU>VAN ARK common, OMS>TEN & OMS>ALA VAN common, TEN>ALA hd to hd, FLA>MSU hd to hd.

== Rankings ==
Ranking movements Legend: ██ Increase in ranking ██ Decrease in ranking — = Not ranked RV = Received votes
	Week																		
Poll	Pre	1	2	3	4	5	6	7	8	9	10	11	12	13	14	15	16	17	Final
Coaches'	RV	RV*	20	17	16	12	11	8	10	15	17	16	20	16	21	20			
Baseball America	—	—	25	20	16	10	10	8	14	21	24	23	25	16	18	18*			
NCBWA†	RV	RV	RV	23	20	16	11	8	10	15	16	17	18	20	15	19			
D1Baseball	—	—	—	23	17	12	12	8	12	15	18	18	23	18	21	24			
Perfect Game	—	—	—	23	22	11	14	8	13	20	25	19	23	16	15	15*			

† NCBWA ranks 30 teams in their preseason poll, but only ranks 25 teams weekly during the season.
* A new poll was not released for this week, so for comparison purposes, the previous week's ranking is inserted in this week's slot.

== See also ==
- 2025 Alabama Crimson Tide softball team
