= 2025 Florida Gators baseball team =

Season of University of Florida baseball team

2025 Florida Gators baseball

Conway Regional, 1–2
- Conference: Southeastern Conference
- Record: 39–22 (15–15 SEC)
- Head coach: Kevin O'Sullivan (18th season)
- Assistant coaches: Chuck Jeroloman; Taylor Black; David Kopp
- Home stadium: Condron Ballpark

2025 Southeastern Conference baseball standings
	Conf.				Overall
Team	W		L	PCT	W		L	PCT
No. 17 Texas ‍†‍‍^{y}	22	–	8	.733	44	–	14	.759
No. 3 Arkansas ‍‍‍^{y}	20	–	10	.667	50	–	15	.769
No. 1 LSU ‍‍‍^{y}	19	–	11	.633	53	–	15	.779
No. 18 Vanderbilt ‍‍‡‍^{y}	19	–	11	.633	43	–	18	.705
No. 19 Georgia ‍‍‍^{y}	18	–	12	.600	43	–	17	.717
No. 11 Auburn ‍‍‍^{y}	17	–	13	.567	41	–	20	.672
No. 21 Ole Miss ‍‍‍^{y}	16	–	14	.533	43	–	21	.672
No. 12 Tennessee ‍‍‍^{y}	16	–	14	.533	46	–	19	.708
Alabama ‍‍‍^{y}	16	–	14	.533	41	–	18	.695
Florida ‍‍‍^{y}	15	–	15	.500	39	–	22	.639
Mississippi State ‍‍‍^{y}	15	–	15	.500	36	–	23	.610
Oklahoma ‍‍‍^{y}	14	–	16	.467	38	–	22	.633
Kentucky ‍‍‍^{y}	13	–	17	.433	31	–	26	.544
Texas A&M ‍‍‍	11	–	19	.367	30	–	26	.536
South Carolina ‍‍‍	6	–	24	.200	28	–	29	.491
Missouri ‍‍‍	3	–	27	.100	16	–	39	.291
† – Conference champion ‡ – Tournament champion y – Invited to the NCAA Tournament; As of June 22, 2025; Rankings from D1Baseball

The 2025 Florida Gators baseball team represents the University of Florida in the sport of baseball during the 2025 college baseball season. Florida competes in the Southeastern Conference (SEC). Home games are played at Condron Ballpark on the university's Gainesville, Florida, campus. The team is coached by Kevin O'Sullivan in his eighteenth season as Florida's head coach. The Gators entered the season looking to return to the College World Series, where they made a surprise run to the semifinals after finishing the regular season at 28–27 last season.

== Preseason ==
=== Preseason SEC awards and honors ===
Second baseman Cade Kurland was named to the All-SEC preseason first team. Catcher Luke Heyman and shortstop Colby Shelton were named to the All-SEC preseason second team.

Preseason All-SEC First Team
Player	No.	Position	Class
Cade Kurland	4	2B	Junior

Preseason All-SEC Second Team
Player	No.	Position	Class
Luke Heyman	28	C	Junior
Colby Shelton	10	SS	Junior

=== Coaches poll ===
The SEC baseball coaches' poll was released on February 5, 2025.

SEC Coaches' Poll
Predicted finish	Team	Points
1	Texas A&M	228 (10)
2	Tennessee	215 (1)
3	Arkansas	214 (3)
4	LSU	204 (1)
5	Florida	183 (1)
6	Georgia	165
7	Vanderbilt	156
8	Texas	146
9	Mississippi State	112
10	Kentucky	102
11	Oklahoma	101
12	Auburn	100
13	Alabama	98
14	South Carolina	61
15	Ole Miss	60
16	Missouri	31

== Roster ==
2025 Florida Gators baseball team
Players
Coaches

#	Pos.	Name	B/T	Height	Weight	Year	Home town
1	UTL	Justin Nadeau	L/R	6 ft 0 in (1.83 m)	195 lb (88 kg)	Jr	St. Johns, Florida
2	OF	Ty Evans	R/R	6 ft 2 in (1.88 m)	215 lb (98 kg)	Sr	Auburndale, Florida
3	OF	Kyle Jones	R/R	6 ft 3 in (1.91 m)	185 lb (84 kg)	So	Athens, Georgia
4	INF	Cade Kurland	R/R	5 ft 11 in (1.8 m)	190 lb (86 kg)	Jr	Tampa, Florida
5	UTL	Blake Cyr	R/R	5 ft 11 in (1.8 m)	190 lb (86 kg)	Jr	Windermere, Florida
6	UTL	Bobby Boser	R/R	6 ft 1 in (1.85 m)	215 lb (98 kg)	Sr	Wesley Chapel, Florida
8	RHP	Christian Rodriguez	R/R	6 ft 0 in (1.83 m)	210 lb (95 kg)	RS Fr	Coral Springs, Florida
9	RHP	Luke McNeillie	L/R	6 ft 3 in (1.91 m)	190 lb (86 kg)	So	Milton, Georgia
10	INF	Colby Shelton	L/R	6 ft 0 in (1.83 m)	205 lb (93 kg)	Jr	Lexington, South Carolina
11	INF	Brendan Lawson	L/R	6 ft 3 in (1.91 m)	215 lb (98 kg)	Fr	Toronto, Ontario
12	RHP	Liam Peterson	R/R	6 ft 5 in (1.96 m)	220 lb (100 kg)	So	Palm Harbor, Florida
13	INF	Landon Stripling	L/R	6 ft 0 in (1.83 m)	200 lb (91 kg)	So	Lawrenceville, Georgia
15	RHP	Joshua Whritenour	L/R	6 ft 2 in (1.88 m)	195 lb (88 kg)	Fr	Tampa, Florida
16	OF	Hayden Yost	L/L	6 ft 1 in (1.85 m)	195 lb (88 kg)	So	Tampa, Florida
17	LHP	Jacob Gomberg	L/L	5 ft 10 in (1.78 m)	180 lb (82 kg)	Fr	Coral Springs, Florida
18	LHP	Pierce Coppola	L/L	6 ft 8 in (2.03 m)	245 lb (111 kg)	RS Jr	Verona, New Jersey
20	RHP	Jake Clemente	R/R	6 ft 3 in (1.91 m)	225 lb (102 kg)	RS So	Coral Springs, Florida
21	UTL	Caden McDonald	R/R	6 ft 3 in (1.91 m)	200 lb (91 kg)	RS Fr	Tampa, Florida
22	RHP	Jackson Barberi	R/R	6 ft 4 in (1.93 m)	180 lb (82 kg)	Fr	Snellville, Georgia
23	RHP	Billy Barlow	R/R	6 ft 2 in (1.88 m)	220 lb (100 kg)	Sr	North Myrtle Beach, South Carolina
24	OF	Blake Brookins	L/R	6 ft 5 in (1.96 m)	225 lb (102 kg)	So	Palmetto Bay, Florida
25	INF	Kolt Myers	R/R	6 ft 2 in (1.88 m)	190 lb (86 kg)	Fr	St. Augustine, Florida
26	LHP	Nico Janssens	L/L	6 ft 4 in (1.93 m)	200 lb (91 kg)	Fr	Spring Hill, Florida
27	RHP	Blaine Rowland	R/R	6 ft 3 in (1.91 m)	220 lb (100 kg)	Fr	Plant City, Florida
28	C	Luke Heyman	R/R	6 ft 4 in (1.93 m)	220 lb (100 kg)	Jr	Longwood, Florida
29	C	Brody Donay	R/R	6 ft 5 in (1.96 m)	235 lb (107 kg)	Jr	Lakeland, Florida
30	UTL	Ashton Wilson	R/R	6 ft 0 in (1.83 m)	200 lb (91 kg)	Jr	Orlando, Florida
31	LHP	Frank Menendez	L/L	6 ft 1 in (1.85 m)	215 lb (98 kg)	So	Miami, Florida
33	LHP	McCall Biemiller	S/L	6 ft 3 in (1.91 m)	215 lb (98 kg)	Fr	Tampa, Florida
34	RHP	Alex Philpott	R/R	6 ft 6 in (1.98 m)	200 lb (91 kg)	So	Tampa, Florida
35	UTL	Brock Clayton	L/R	6 ft 3 in (1.91 m)	210 lb (95 kg)	Fr	Gulf Breeze, Florida
37	RHP	Matthew Jenkins	R/R	6 ft 6 in (1.98 m)	195 lb (88 kg)	So	Live Oak, Florida
38	LHP	Mason Laurito	L/L	6 ft 0 in (1.83 m)	170 lb (77 kg)	So	Ocala, Florida
40	C	Cole Bullen	S/R	5 ft 9 in (1.75 m)	175 lb (79 kg)	RS Jr	Belleview, Florida
44	RHP	Felix Ong	R/R	6 ft 4 in (1.93 m)	220 lb (100 kg)	Fr	Key West, Florida
45	RHP	Schuyler Sanford	R/R	6 ft 6 in (1.98 m)	215 lb (98 kg)	Fr	Jacksonville, Florida
47	RHP	Aidan King	L/R	6 ft 2 in (1.88 m)	195 lb (88 kg)	Fr	Jacksonville, Florida
99	RHP	Carson Montsdeoca	R/R	6 ft 3 in (1.91 m)	205 lb (93 kg)	Fr	Bowling Green, Florida

Head coach

7 Kevin O'Sullivan

Assistant coach(es)

Taylor Black
Chuck Jeroloman
David Kopp
Mike Rivera
Michael Byrne

Legend

- (C) Team captain
- (S) Suspended
- (I) Ineligible
- Injured
- Current redshirt

Roster
Last update: February 8, 2025

== Schedule ==
Legend
	Florida win
	Florida loss
	Postponement
**Bold**	Florida team member

2025 Florida Gators baseball game log (39–22)
Regular season (37–19)

February (10–0)
Date	Opponent	Rank	Stadium Site	Score	Win	Loss	Save	Attendance	Overall Record	SEC Record
February 14	Air Force	No. 10	Condron Ballpark; Gainesville, FL	**W** 7–0	**L. Peterson** (1–0)	D. Rogers (0–1)	None	6,935	1–0	–
February 15 (1)	Air Force	No. 10	Condron Ballpark	**W** 10–4	**J. Clemente** (1–0)	C. Smelcer (0–1)	**L. McNeillie** (1)	6,647	2–0	–
February 15 (2)^{[a]}	Air Force	No. 10	Condron Ballpark	**W** 11–1^{7}	**P. Coppola** (1–0)	J. Mitchell (0–1)	None	6,647	3–0	–
February 18	at Jacksonville	No. 10	John Sessions Stadium; Jacksonville, FL	**W** 10–4	**L. McNeillie** (1–0)	A. Walsh (0–1)	None	1,018	4–0	–
February 19	Florida A&M	No. 10	Condron Ballpark	Postponed (inclement weather) Makeup: March 19						
February 21	Dayton	No. 10	Condron Ballpark	**W** 13–1^{7}	**L. Peterson** (2–0)	C. Peguero (0–2)	None	6,204	5–0	–
February 22	Dayton	No. 10	Condron Ballpark	**W** 11–1^{8}	**F. Menendez** (1–0)	P. Malecha (0–1)	None	8,155	6–0	–
February 23	Dayton	No. 10	Condron Ballpark	**W** 12–2^{8}	**P. Coppola** (2–0)	B. Dean (0–1)	None	5,425	7–0	–
February 25	at Stetson	No. 8	Conrad Park; DeLand, FL	**W** 6–1	**A. King** (1–0)	E. Salak (0–1)	None	2,916	8–0	–
February 26	North Florida	No. 8	Condron Ballpark	**W** 7–6	**C. McDonald** (1–0)	K. Humphrey (0–1)	None	5,086	9–0	–
February 28	Miami (FL); Rivalry	No. 8	Condron Ballpark	**W** 6–2	**L. Peterson** (3–0)	N. Robert (2–1)	None	7,118	10–0	–
^{^[a]}Rescheduled from February 16 as a single-admission doubleheader due to the threat of inclement weather.

March (9–11)
Date	Opponent	Rank	Stadium Site	Score	Win	Loss	Save	Attendance	Overall Record	SEC Record
March 1	Miami (FL); Rivalry	No. 8	Condron Ballpark	**W** 6–3	**A. King** (2–0)	G. Hugas (2–1)	**A. Philpott** (1)	9,303	11–0	–
March 2	Miami (FL); Rivalry	No. 8	Condron Ballpark	**L** 7–13	C. Fischer (1–0)	**N. Janssens** (0–1)	None	7,316	11–1	–
March 4	at UCF	No. 7	John Euliano Park; Orlando, FL	**L** 3–13	D. Castellano (2–0)	**M. Jenkins** (0–1)	None	4,204	11–2	–
March 5	Florida Atlantic	No. 7	Condron Ballpark	**W** 4–2	**B. Barlow** (1–0)	Z. Kilby (0–1)	**A. Philpott** (2)	4,408	12–2	–
March 7	Harvard	No. 7	Condron Ballpark	**W** 12–0^{7}	**L. Peterson** (4–0)	C. Fang (0–1)	None	7,365	13–2	–
March 8 (1)	Harvard	No. 7	Condron Ballpark	**W** 7–0^{7}	**A. King** (3–0)	T. Pauley (0–3)	None	7,019	14–2	–
March 8 (2)^{[b]}	Harvard	No. 7	Condron Ballpark	**W** 22–6^{7}	**L. McNeillie** (2–0)	G. Colasante (0–2)	None	7,019	15–2	–
March 11	at No. 5 Florida State; Rivalry	No. 7	Dick Howser Stadium; Tallahassee, FL	**W** 7–2	**J. Barberi** (1–0)	E. Chrest (2–1)	None	6,700	16–2	–
March 14	at No. 2 Tennessee	No. 7	Lindsey Nelson Stadium; Knoxville, TN	**L** 3–5	T. Franklin (1–0)	**L. Peterson** (4–1)	N. Snead (2)	6,298	16–3	0–1
March 15	at No. 2 Tennessee	No. 7	Lindsey Nelson Stadium	**L** 0–10^{7}	M. Phillips (2–0)	**A. King** (3–1)	None	5,575	16–4	0–2
March 16	at No. 2 Tennessee	No. 7	Lindsey Nelson Stadium	**L** 4–7	D. Loy (3–0)	**B. Barlow** (1–1)	N. Snead (3)	5,579	16–5	0–3
March 18	Jacksonville	No. 13	Condron Ballpark	**W** 16–4^{7}	**C. Rodriguez** (1–0)	A. Zenus (0–1)	None	5,280	17–5	–
March 19	Florida A&M	No. 13	Condron Ballpark	**W** 14–4^{7}	**C. McDonald** (2–0)	R. Young (0–1)	None	6,467	18–5	–
March 21	No. 4 Georgia	No. 13	Condron Ballpark	**L** 7–8	J. Stephens (3–0)	**A. Philpott** (0–1)	K. Smith (1)	7,848	18–6	0–4
March 22	No. 4 Georgia	No. 13	Condron Ballpark	**L** 2–17	B. Curley (2–0)	**B. Barlow** (1–2)	None	8,160	18–7	0–5
March 23	No. 4 Georgia	No. 13	Condron Ballpark	**L** 4–15^{7}	L. Finley (2–0)	**J. Clemente** (1–1)	None	7,579	18–8	0–6
March 25	vs. No. 4 Florida State; Rivalry		VyStar Ballpark; Jacksonville, FL	**L** 4–8	H. Rowan (1–0)	**A. Philpott** (0–2)	None	7,341	18–9	–
March 27	at No. 15 Ole Miss		Swayze Field; Oxford, MS	**L** 5–7	H. Elliott (5–0)	**L. McNeillie** (2–0)	B. Jones (1)	9,867	18–10	0–7
March 28 (1)	at No. 15 Ole Miss		Swayze Field	**L** 9–10	H. Calhoun (2–0)	**J. Barberi** (1–1)	None	9,504	18–11	0–8
March 28 (2)^{[c]}	at No. 15 Ole Miss		Swayze Field	**W** 11–8	**L. McNeillie** (3–1)	B. Jones (1–1)	**B. Barlow** (1)	9,576	19–11	1–8
^{^[b]}Rescheduled from March 9 as a single-admission, 7-inning doubleheader due to the threat of inclement weather.^{^[c]}Rescheduled from March 29 as a split doubleheader due to the threat of inclement weather.

April (11–5)
Date	Opponent	Rank	Stadium Site	Score	Win	Loss	Save	Attendance	Overall Record	SEC Record
April 1	North Florida		Condron Ballpark	**W** 8–4	**J. Clemente** (2–1)	J. Bellhorn (2–1)	None	4,905	20–11	–
April 4	No. 23 Vanderbilt		Condron Ballpark	**L** 0–6	M. Green (1–2)	**L. Peterson** (4–2)	S. Hawks (3)	5,659	20–12	1–9
April 5	No. 23 Vanderbilt		Condron Ballpark	**L** 2–3	A. Kranzler (5–1)	**B. Barlow** (1–3)	C. Fennell (1)	5,639	20–13	1–10
April 6	No. 23 Vanderbilt		Condron Ballpark	**L** 3–11	M. Shorey (2–0)	**A. Philpott** (0–3)	T. O'Rourke (2)	5,546	20–14	1–11
April 8	No. 9 Florida State; Rivalry		Condron Ballpark	**W** 5–4	**M. Biemiller** (1–0)	M. Martinez (0–2)	**J. Clemente** (1)	6,059	21–14	–
April 10	Missouri		Condron Ballpark	**W** 11–2	**L. Peterson** (5–2)	B. Kehlenbrink (0–3)	None	4,962	22–14	2–11
April 11	Missouri		Condron Ballpark	Postponed (inclement weather) Makeup: April 12 as a single-admission, 7-inning doubleheader						
April 12 (1)	Missouri		Condron Ballpark	**W** 5–0^{7}	**A. King** (4–1)	K. Jacobi (2–5)	**J. Clemente** (2)	6,067	23–14	3–11
April 12 (2)	Missouri		Condron Ballpark	**W** 3–2^{7}	**A. Philpott** (1–3)	X. Lovett (1–2)	None	6,067	24–14	4–11
April 15	Stetson		Condron Ballpark	**W** 14–4^{7}	**A. Philpott** (2–3)	M. Davenport (0–4)	None	4,948	25–14	–
April 18	at Mississippi State		Dudy Noble Field; Starkville, MS	**W** 13–3^{8}	**L. Peterson** (6–2)	S. Simmons (3–2)	None	11,925	26–14	5–11
April 19	at Mississippi State		Dudy Noble Field	**W** 11–8	**A. Philpott** (3–3)	N. Williams (1–3)	**J. Clemente** (3)	11,413	27–14	6–11
April 20	at Mississippi State		Dudy Noble Field	**L** 8–14	K. Ligon (4–4)	**L. McNeillie** (3–2)	None	9,699	27–15	6–12
April 22	Georgia Southern		Condron Ballpark	**W** 12–1^{7}	**C. McDonald** (3–0)	E. Vandenbosch (0–2)	None	4,816	28–15	–
April 25	No. 5 Arkansas		Condron Ballpark	**W** 6–4	**L. Peterson** (7–2)	Z. Root (5–3)	**J. Clemente** (4)	6,542	29–15	7–12
April 26	No. 5 Arkansas		Condron Ballpark	**L** 0–7	G. Gaeckle (4–1)	**A. King** (4–2)	None	6,081	29–16	7–13
April 27	No. 5 Arkansas		Condron Ballpark	**W** 9–5	**L. McNeillie** (4–2)	C. Wiggins (1–1)	**J. Clemente** (5)	5,681	30–16	8–13

May (7–3)
Date	Opponent	Rank	Stadium Site	Score	Win	Loss	Save	Attendance	Overall Record	SEC Record
May 2	at South Carolina		Founders Park; Columbia, SC	**W** 9–5	**C. McDonald** (4–0)	J. Soucie (3–1)	**J. Clemente** (6)	7,616	31–16	9–13
May 3^{[d]}	at South Carolina		Founders Park	**W** 22–3	**L. Peterson** (8–2)	J. McCoy (4–4)	None	7,752	32–16	10–13
May 4	at South Carolina		Founders Park	**W** 8–0^{7}	**J. Barberi** (2–1)	A. Crowther (2–1)	**C. Rodriguez** (1)	7,151	33–16	11–13
May 6	South Florida		Condron Ballpark	**L** 1–7	B. Keyster (1–0)	**A. Philpott** (3–4)	A. Longoria (1)	5,298	33–17	–
May 9	at No. 1 Texas		Disch–Falk Field; Austin, TX	**W** 8–2	**P. Coppola** (3–0)	R. Riojas (8–3)	None	7,149	34–17	12–13
May 10	at No. 1 Texas		Disch–Falk Field	**L** 2–5	T. Burns (1–2)	**M. Jenkins** (0–2)	D. Volantis (12)	7,073	34–18	12–14
May 11	at No. 1 Texas		Disch–Falk Field	**W** 4–1	**A. King** (5–2)	J. Flores (4–2)	None	7,021	35–18	13–14
May 15	No. 18 Alabama	No. 23	Condron Ballpark	**W** 7–6	**L. McNeillie** (5–2)	J. Blackwood (2–2)	**J. Clemente** (7)	5,881	36–18	14–14
May 16	No. 18 Alabama	No. 23	Condron Ballpark	**L** 6–9	R. Quick (8–2)	**B. Barlow** (1–4)	None	6,199	36–19	14–15
May 17	No. 18 Alabama	No. 23	Condron Ballpark	**W** 9–3	**A. King** (6–2)	Z. Adams (7–3)	None	6,595	37–19	15–15
^{^[d]}The game was suspended during the third inning due to inclement weather with Florida leading 1–0 and continued at 1:30 p.m. on May 4 prior to the start of the game scheduled for that day, which became a 7-inning game.

Postseason (2–3)

SEC tournament (1–1)
Date	Opponent	Rank	Stadium Site	Score	Win	Loss	Save	Attendance	Overall Record	SECT Record
May 20	vs. (15) South Carolina; First round	No. 15 (10)	Hoover Metropolitan Stadium; Hoover, AL	**W** 11–3	**B. Rowland** (1–0)	B. Stone (2–7)	None	7,242	38–19	1–0
May 21	vs. No. 17 (7) Ole Miss; Second round	No. 15 (10)	Hoover Metropolitan Stadium	**L** 1–3	H. Elliott (9–3)	**L. Peterson** (8–3)	C. Spencer (5)		38–20	1–1

NCAA tournament: Conway Regional (1–2)
Date	Opponent	Rank	Stadium Site	Score	Win	Loss	Save	Attendance	Overall Record	Regional Record
May 30	vs. (3) East Carolina; First round	No. 17 (2)	Springs Brooks Stadium; Conway, SC	**L** 6–11	E. Norby (8–4)	**L. Peterson** (8–4)	None	4,517	38–21	0–1
May 31	vs. (4) Fairfield; First round elimination game	No. 17 (2)	Springs Brooks Stadium	**W** 17–2	**A. King** (7–2)	B. Baker (8–2)	None	4,321	39–21	1–1
June 1	vs. (3) East Carolina; Second round elimination game	No. 17 (2)	Springs Brooks Stadium	**L** 4–11	L. Williams (3–1)	**P. Coppola** (3–1)	J. Hunter (4)	4,442	39–22	1–2

Schedule source:

*Rankings are based on the team's current ranking in the D1 Baseball poll.

== Record vs. conference opponents ==
Blank are not scheduled. Blue are home games, otherwise away.

2025 SEC baseball records Source: 2025 SEC baseball game results, 2025 SEC baseball schedule
Tm	W–L	ALA	ARK	AUB	FLA	UGA	KEN	LSU	MSU	MIZ	OKL	OMS	SCA	TEN	TEX	TAM	VAN	Tm	SR	SW
ALA	16–14		.	1–2	1–2	2–1	.	1–2	1–2	3–0	2–1	.	.	1–2	.	3–0	1–2	ALA	4–6	2–0
ARK	20–10	.		.	1–2	1–2	.	1–2	.	3–0	.	2–1	3–0	2–1	3–0	1–2	3–0	ARK	6–4	4–0
AUB	17–13	2–1	.		.	0–3	2–1	3–0	2–1	.	.	1–2	3–0	2–1	0–3	.	2–1	AUB	7–3	2–2
FLA	15–15	2–1	2–1	.		0–3	.	.	2–1	3–0	.	1–2	3–0	0–3	2–1	.	0–3	FLA	6–4	2–3
UGA	18–12	1–2	2–1	3–0	3–0		2–1	.	.	3–0	2–1	.	.	.	0–3	2–1	0–3	UGA	7–3	3–2
KEN	13–17	.	.	1–2	.	1–2		.	0–3	.	3–0	1–2	2–1	2–1	1–2	2–1	0–3	KEN	4–6	1–2
LSU	19–11	2–1	2–1	0–3	.	.	.		3–0	3–0	3–0	.	2–1	2–1	1–2	1–2	.	LSU	7–3	3–1
MSU	15–15	2–1	.	1–2	1–2	.	3–0	0–3		3–0	1–2	2–1	2–1	.	0–3	.	.	MSU	5–5	2–2
MIZ	3–27	0–3	0–3	.	0–3	0–3	.	0–3	0–3		0–3	0–3	.	.	0–3	3–0	.	MIZ	1–9	1–9
OKL	14–16	1–2	.	.	.	1–2	0–3	0–3	2–1	3–0		2–1	2–1	.	1–2	.	2–1	OKL	5–5	1–2
OMS	16–14	.	1–2	2–1	2–1	.	2–1	.	1–2	3–0	1–2		1–2	1–2	.	.	2–1	OMS	5–5	1–0
SCA	6–24	.	0–3	0–3	0–3	.	1–2	1–2	1–2	.	1–2	2–1		0–3	.	0–3	.	SCA	1–9	0–5
TEN	16–14	2–1	1–2	1–2	3–0	.	1–2	1–2	.	.	.	2–1	3–0		.	1–2	1–2	TEN	4–6	2–0
TEX	22–8	.	0–3	3–0	1–2	3–0	2–1	2–1	3–0	3–0	2–1	.	.	.		3–0	.	TEX	8–2	5–1
TAM	11–19	0–3	2–1	.	.	1–2	1–2	2–1	.	0–3	.	.	3–0	2–1	0–3		0–3	TAM	4–6	1–4
VAN	19–11	2–1	0–3	1–2	3–0	3–0	3–0	.	.	.	1–2	1–2	.	2–1	.	3–0		VAN	6–4	4–1
Tm	W–L	ALA	ARK	AUB	FLA	UGA	KEN	LSU	MSU	MIZ	OKL	OMS	SCA	TEN	TEX	TAM	VAN	Team	SR	SW

Updated for entire regular season.
Tie brkrs: LSU>VAN ARK common, OMS>TEN & OMS>ALA VAN common, TEN>ALA hd to hd, FLA>MSU hd to hd.

== Rankings ==
Ranking movements Legend: ██ Increase in ranking ██ Decrease in ranking — = Not ranked RV = Received votes
	Week																		
Poll	Pre	1	2	3	4	5	6	7	8	9	10	11	12	13	14	15	16	17	Final
Coaches'	10	10*	7	6	7	11	23	RV	—	—	—	—	RV	RV	21	15	18	18*	RV
Baseball America	7	6	6	6	6	8	19	—	—	—	—	—	—	22	13	12	12*	12*	23
NCBWA†	10	10	7	7	6	6	22	RV	RV	RV	RV	RV	RV	RV	25	19	15	24	24
D1Baseball	10	10	8	7	7	13	—	—	—	—	—	—	—	—	23	15	17	17*	—
Perfect Game	11	11	10	8	7	10	24	—	—	—	—	—	—	—	20	14	14*	14*	—

† NCBWA ranks 30 teams in their preseason poll, but only ranks 25 teams weekly during the season.
* A new poll was not released for this week, so for comparison purposes, the previous week's ranking is inserted in this week's slot.
