= 2025 Oklahoma Sooners baseball team =

College Baseball Season

2025 Oklahoma Sooners baseball

Chapel Hill Regional, 3−2
- Conference: Southeastern Conference
- Record: 38–22 (14–16 SEC)
- Head coach: Skip Johnson (8th season)
- Associate head coach: Reggie Willits (2nd season)
- Assistant coaches: Todd Butler (2nd season); Russell Raley (3rd season)
- Home stadium: L. Dale Mitchell Baseball Park

2025 Southeastern Conference baseball standings
	Conf.				Overall
Team	W		L	PCT	W		L	PCT
No. 17 Texas ‍†‍‍^{y}	22	–	8	.733	44	–	14	.759
No. 3 Arkansas ‍‍‍^{y}	20	–	10	.667	50	–	15	.769
No. 1 LSU ‍‍‍^{y}	19	–	11	.633	53	–	15	.779
No. 18 Vanderbilt ‍‍‡‍^{y}	19	–	11	.633	43	–	18	.705
No. 19 Georgia ‍‍‍^{y}	18	–	12	.600	43	–	17	.717
No. 11 Auburn ‍‍‍^{y}	17	–	13	.567	41	–	20	.672
No. 21 Ole Miss ‍‍‍^{y}	16	–	14	.533	43	–	21	.672
No. 12 Tennessee ‍‍‍^{y}	16	–	14	.533	46	–	19	.708
Alabama ‍‍‍^{y}	16	–	14	.533	41	–	18	.695
Florida ‍‍‍^{y}	15	–	15	.500	39	–	22	.639
Mississippi State ‍‍‍^{y}	15	–	15	.500	36	–	23	.610
Oklahoma ‍‍‍^{y}	14	–	16	.467	38	–	22	.633
Kentucky ‍‍‍^{y}	13	–	17	.433	31	–	26	.544
Texas A&M ‍‍‍	11	–	19	.367	30	–	26	.536
South Carolina ‍‍‍	6	–	24	.200	28	–	29	.491
Missouri ‍‍‍	3	–	27	.100	16	–	39	.291
† – Conference champion ‡ – Tournament champion y – Invited to the NCAA Tournament; As of June 22, 2025; Rankings from D1Baseball

The 2025 Oklahoma Sooners baseball team represent the University of Oklahoma during the 2025 NCAA Division I baseball season. The Sooners played their home games at L. Dale Mitchell Baseball Park. It is Oklahoma's first season as members of the SEC. They are led by head coach Skip Johnson, in his 8th season at Oklahoma.

== Previous season ==
The Sooners finished the 2024 season with a 40–21 overall record and a 23–7 record in Big 12 play, winning the regular season title in their final season in the conference. In the 2024 Big 12 Conference baseball tournament, the Sooners reached the final, where they played their in-state rivals, Oklahoma State, where they lost, 3–9 in the championship.

Despite losing the Big 12 title, the Sooners received an at-large berth into the 2024 NCAA Division I baseball tournament, receiving an 11th overall seed, giving them rights to host a regional. In the Norman Regional, they were pitted with Oral Roberts, Duke, and UConn. In the regional final, Oklahoma lost 1–7 to UConn, missing out at a chance to play in a Super Regional.

== Preseason ==
=== SEC coaches poll ===
The SEC Coaches poll was released on February 2, 2025. Oklahoma was predicted to finish eleventh in the SEC.

SEC coaches poll
Predicted finish	Team	Votes (1st place)
1	Texas A&M	228 (10)
2	Tennessee	215 (1)
3	Arkansas	214 (3)
4	LSU	204 (1)
5	Florida	183 (1)
6	Georgia	165
7	Vanderbilt	156
8	Texas	146
9	Mississippi State	112
10	Kentucky	102
11	Oklahoma	101
12	Auburn	100
13	Alabama	98
14	South Carolina	61
15	Ole Miss	60
16	Missouri	31

=== Awards and honors ===
==== Preseason SEC awards and honors ====
Preseason All-SEC Team
Player	No.	Position	Class	Designation
Kyson Witherspoon	26	SP	Junior	Second Team

== Personnel ==
=== Starters ===
Lineup
Pos.	No.	Player.	Year
C	2	Easton Carmichael	Junior
1B	16	Dayton Tockey	Junior
2B	6	Kyle Branch	Freshman
3B	5	Dawson Willis	Junior
SS	7	Jaxson Willits	Sophomore
LF	17	Dasan Harris	Sophomore
CF	1	Jason Walk	Sophomore
RF	40	Sam Christiansen	RS Sophomore
DH	20	Trey Gambill	Junior

Weekend pitching rotation
Day	No.	Player.	Year
Friday	26	Kyson Witherspoon	Junior
Saturday	31	Cameron Johnson	Sophomore
Sunday	25	Malachi Witherspoon	Junior

=== Roster ===
2025 Oklahoma Sooners baseball team
Players
Coaches

#	Pos.	Name	B/T	Height	Weight	Year	Home town
1	UTL	Jason Walk	S/R	5 ft 9 in (1.75 m)	166 lb (75 kg)	So	Acworth, GA
2	C	Easton Carmichael	R/R	6 ft 1 in (1.85 m)	200 lb (91 kg)	Jr	Prosper, TX
3	OF	Christian Hoffman	L/R	6 ft 3 in (1.91 m)	229 lb (104 kg)	Jr	Albuquerque, NM
4	INF	Mason Hamlin	R/R	6 ft 2 in (1.88 m)	211 lb (96 kg)	Jr	Falcon, CO
5	INF	Dawson Willis	R/R	6 ft 4 in (1.93 m)	184 lb (83 kg)	Jr	Ruston, LA
6	INF	Kyle Branch	R/R	5 ft 11 in (1.8 m)	182 lb (83 kg)	Fr	Lucas, TX
7	INF	Jaxon Willits	S/R	6 ft 0 in (1.83 m)	202 lb (92 kg)	So	Fort Cobb, OK
8	OF	Taylor Tatum	R/R	5 ft 10 in (1.78 m)	208 lb (94 kg)	Fr	Longview, TX
9	UTL	Brandon Cain	R/R	6 ft 0 in (1.83 m)	174 lb (79 kg)	Jr	Mobile, AL
11	RHP	Jacob Gholston	R/R	6 ft 7 in (2.01 m)	218 lb (99 kg)	So	Flower Mound, TX
12	INF	Ryley Leininger	L/R	6 ft 2 in (1.88 m)	221 lb (100 kg)	Fr	Georgetown, TX
14	RHP	Jackson Kircher	R/R	6 ft 3 in (1.91 m)	219 lb (99 kg)	Fr	Little Rock, AR
16	INF	Dayton Tockey	L/L	6 ft 2 in (1.88 m)	227 lb (103 kg)	Jr	Fort Worth, TX
17	OF	Dasan Harris	L/L	6 ft 0 in (1.83 m)	181 lb (82 kg)	So	Plano, TX
18	LHP	Gavyn Jones	L/L	6 ft 1 in (1.85 m)	206 lb (93 kg)	So	White Oak, TX
20	OF	Trey Gambill	L/R	6 ft 0 in (1.83 m)	194 lb (88 kg)	Jr	Alpine, UT
21	INF	Drew Dickerson	R/R	6 ft 4 in (1.93 m)	210 lb (95 kg)	Fr	Lee's Summit, MO
22	C	Scott Mudler	L/R	6 ft 2 in (1.88 m)	220 lb (100 kg)	Sr	Johns Creek, GA
23	LHP	Cade Crossland	R/L	6 ft 1 in (1.85 m)	210 lb (95 kg)	Jr	Rockwall, TX
25	RHP	Malachi Witherspoon	R/R	6 ft 3 in (1.91 m)	211 lb (96 kg)	Jr	Jacksonville, FL
26	RHP	Kyson Witherspoon	R/R	6 ft 2 in (1.88 m)	207 lb (94 kg)	Jr	Jacksonville, FL
27	RHP	Landon Victorian	R/R	6 ft 3 in (1.91 m)	178 lb (81 kg)	Fr	Lake Charles, LA
28	UTL	Brayden Horton	L/R	5 ft 11 in (1.8 m)	197 lb (89 kg)	Jr	Sayre, PA
29	LHP	Jaden Barfield	L/L	5 ft 9 in (1.75 m)	216 lb (98 kg)	Fr	Pearland, TX
30	RHP	Michael Catalano	R/R	6 ft 0 in (1.83 m)	206 lb (93 kg)	Fr	Frisco, TX
31	LHP	Cameron Johnson	L/L	6 ft 6 in (1.98 m)	250 lb (113 kg)	So	Upper Marlboro, MD
32	RHP	Dylan Tate	R/R	6 ft 0 in (1.83 m)	194 lb (88 kg)	Jr	Eureka, MO
33	RHP	Berkeley Roddy	R/R	6 ft 2 in (1.88 m)	218 lb (99 kg)	Fr	Fort Worth, TX
34	LHP	Beau Sampson	L/L	6 ft 6 in (1.98 m)	226 lb (103 kg)	So	St. George, UT
35	RHP	Jason Bodin	L/R	6 ft 3 in (1.91 m)	193 lb (88 kg)	So	Orange, TX
36	LHP	Grant Stevens	L/L	5 ft 9 in (1.75 m)	199 lb (90 kg)	Gr	Elk Grove, CA
37	RHP	Mitch Haythorn	R/R	6 ft 0 in (1.83 m)	203 lb (92 kg)	Fr	Eaton, CO
39	C	Cole Hansen	R/R	6 ft 0 in (1.83 m)	210 lb (95 kg)	Fr	Norco, CA
40	UTL	Sam Christiansen	L/L	6 ft 1 in (1.85 m)	212 lb (96 kg)	RS So	Mesa, AZ
41	INF	Reid Graham	R/R	6 ft 6 in (1.98 m)	185 lb (84 kg)	Fr	Waxahachie, TX
42	RHP	Reid Hensley	R/R	6 ft 0 in (1.83 m)	212 lb (96 kg)	Sr	Lufkin, TX
43	RHP	Dylan Crooks	R/R	6 ft 0 in (1.83 m)	187 lb (85 kg)	Sr	Euless, TX
45	LHP	Jordan Stribling	L/L	6 ft 6 in (1.98 m)	232 lb (105 kg)	Fr	Highland Park, TX
48	LHP	James Hitt	L/L	6 ft 0 in (1.83 m)	194 lb (88 kg)	Sr	Magnolia, MA
54	LHP	Nate Smithburg	L/L	6 ft 2 in (1.88 m)	209 lb (95 kg)	Jr	Libertyville, IA
58	RHP	James Nesta	R/R	6 ft 3 in (1.91 m)	217 lb (98 kg)	RS Fr	Huntersville, NC

Head coach

Skip Johnson

Assistant coach(es)

Reggie Willits
Todd Butler
Russell Raley
Ryan Gaines
Britt Bonneau

Legend

- (C) Team captain
- (S) Suspended
- (I) Ineligible
- Injured
- Current redshirt

Roster
Last update: February 15, 2025

=== Coaching staff ===
2025 Oklahoma Sooners baseball coaching staff
Name	Position	Seasons at OU	Alma mater
Skip Johnson	Head coach	6	University of Texas Rio Grande Valley (1989)
Reggie Willits	Associate head coach	1	University of Oklahoma (2003)
Todd Butler	Assistant coach	2	University of Oklahoma (1999)
Russell Raley	Assistant coach	3	University of Oklahoma (2006)
Ryan Gaines	Chief of Staff	21	University of Oklahoma (1995)
Britt Bonneau	Director of Player Development	7	University of Oklahoma (1992)

== Game log ==
2025 Oklahoma Sooners baseball game log (38–22)
Regular season (33–19)

February (9–0)
Date	TV	Opponent	Rank	Stadium	Score	Win	Loss	Save	Attendance	Overall	SEC	Source
February 14 (DH 1)	SECN+	Lehigh*		L. Dale Mitchell Park; Norman, OK	W 11–3	K. Witherspoon (1–0)	Danchision (0–1)	None	709	1–0	—	Report
February 14 (DH 2)	SECN+	Lehigh*		L. Dale Mitchell Park	W 13–3^{8}	Johnson (1–0)	Ermigiotti (0–1)	None	832	2–0	—	Report
February 15	SECN+	Lehigh*		L. Dale Mitchell Park	W 12–1^{7}	M. Witherspoon (1–0)	Andolina (0–1)	None	962	3–0	—	Report
February 19	KREF	vs. UT Arlington*		Globe Life Field; Arlington, TX	Postponed							
Round Rock Classic
February 21	D1Baseball.com	vs. Minnesota*		Dell Diamond; Round Rock, TX	W 3–2	K. Witherspoon (2–0)	Selvig (1–1)	Crooks (1)		4–0	—	
February 22	D1Baseball.com	vs. No. 7 Oregon State*		Dell Diamond	W 8–4	Crossland (1–0)	Whitney (1–1)	None	4,151	5–0	—	
February 23	D1Baseball.com	vs. No. 2 Virginia*		Dell Diamond	W 5–4	Barfield (1–0)	Lanzendorfer (1–1)	None	4,302	6–0	—	
February 25	SECN+	Texas Southern*	No. 16	L. Dale Mitchell Park	W 15–4^{7}	Gholston (1–0)	Mayes (0–1)	None	2,282	7–0	—	
February 26	SECN+	Texas Southern*	No. 16	L. Dale Mitchell Park	W 5–4	Catalano (1–0)	Braziel (0–3)	Crooks (2)	1,962	8–0	—	
February 28	SECN+	CSUN*	No. 16	L. Dale Mitchell Park	W 9–0	K. Witherspoon (3–0)	Halamicek (0–2)	None	2,547	9–0	—	

March (13–5)
Date	TV	Opponent	Rank	Stadium	Score	Win	Loss	Save	Attendance	Overall	SEC	Source
March 1	SECN+	CSUN*	No. 16	L. Dale Mitchell Park	W 10–2	M. Witherspoon (2–0)	Rinehart (0–1)	None	3,425	10–0	—	
March 2	SECN+	CSUN*	No. 16	L. Dale Mitchell Park	W 3–2	Bodin (1–0)	Armijo (0–1)	Crooks (3)	2,128	11–0	—	
March 4	ESPN+	at No. 21 Dallas Baptist*	No. 13	Horner Ballpark; Dallas, TX	L 0–11^{7}	Borberg (1–1)	Crossland (1–1)	None	1,178	11–1	—	
March 7	SECN+	Sam Houston State*	No. 13	L. Dale Mitchell Park	W 6–5	K. Weatherspoon (4–0)	Peterson (0–4)	Crooks (4)	2,236	12–1	—	
March 9 (DH 1)	SECN+	Sam Houston State*	No. 13	L. Dale Mitchell Park	W 7–3	Johnson (2–0)	Bennett (0–2)	Hensley (1)	2,092	13–1	—	
March 9 (DH 2)	SECN+	Sam Houston State*	No. 13	L. Dale Mitchell Park	W 9–7^{7}	Jones (1–0)	Johnson (0–1)	Crooks (5)	2,092	14–1	—	
March 12	SECN+	Louisiana Tech*	No. 12	L. Dale Mitchell Park	W 9–5	Simpson (1–0)	Parker (1–1)	None	2,141	15–1	—	
March 14	SECN+	at South Carolina	No. 12	Founders Park; Columbia, SC	W 8–5	K. Witherspoon (5–0)	Stone (1–1)	Crooks (6)	7,264	16–1	1–0	
March 15	SECN+	at South Carolina	No. 12	Founders Park	L 5–11	McCoy (2–1)	M. Witherspoon (2–1)	Pitzer (1)	7,140	16–2	1–1	
March 16	SECN+	at South Carolina	No. 12	Founders Park	W 6–5^{10}	Crooks (1–0)	Sweeney (0–1)	None	7,245	17–2	2–1	
March 18	SECN+	UT Arlington*	No. 10	L. Dale Mitchell Park	W 7–6	Hensley (1–0)	Calhoun (0–1)	None	3,072	18–2	–	
March 21	SECN+	Mississippi State	No. 10	L. Dale Mitchell Park	L 1–2	Kohn (4–0)	Ky. Witherspoon (5–1)	Dotson (2)	3,539	18–3	2–2	
March 22	SECN+	Mississippi State	No. 10	L. Dale Mitchell Park	W 13–11	Crooks (2–0)	Williams (0–2)	None	4,161	19–3	3–2	
March 23	SECN+	Mississippi State	No. 10	L. Dale Mitchell Park	W 7–3	Bodin (2–0)	Ligon (2–3)	Crooks (7)	3,194	20–3	4–2	
March 25	ESPN+	at Oral Roberts*	No. 9	J. L. Johnson Stadium; Tulsa, OK	W 11–2	Hensley (2–0)	Johnson (0–2)	None	2,405	21–3	—	
March 28	SECN+	at No. 12 Alabama	No. 9	Sewell–Thomas Stadium; Tuscaloosa, AL	L 6–8	Ozmer (3–0)	Bodin (2–1)	None	5,179	21–4	4–3	
March 29	SECN	at No. 12 Alabama	No. 9	Sewell–Thomas Stadium	W 6–5	Hensley (3–0)	Banks (0–1)	Crooks (8)	4,062	22–4	5–3	
March 30	SECN+	at No. 12 Alabama	No. 9	Sewell–Thomas Stadium	L 6–8	Finateri (1–0)	M. Witherspoon (2–2)	Ozmer (7)	3,625	22–5	5–4	

April (8–8)
Date	TV	Opponent	Rank	Stadium	Score	Win	Loss	Save	Attendance	Overall	SEC	Source
April 1		vs. Texas Tech	No. 10	Riders Field; Frisco, TX	W 8–6	Catalano (2–0)	Crotchfelt (1–2)	Crooks (9)	4,217	23–5	—	
April 3	ESPN2	No. 7 LSU	No. 10	L. Dale Mitchell Park	L 0–2	Anderson (6–0)	K. Witherspoon (5–2)	None	3,107	23–6	5–5	
April 4	SECN+	No. 7 LSU	No. 10	L. Dale Mitchell Park	L 2–10	Eyanson (5–0)	Crossland (1–2)	Evans (6)	3,258	23–7	5–6	
April 5	SECN+	No. 7 LSU	No. 10	L. Dale Mitchell Park	L 2–3	Shores (5–0)	M. Witherspoon (2–3)	Cowan (4)	2,723	23–8	5–7	
April 8	SECN+	Dallas Baptist*	No. 19	L. Dale Mitchell Park	L 1–9	Jenkins (2–0)	Hensley (3–1)	None	2,107	23–9		
April 11	SECN	No. 17 Vanderbilt	No. 19	L. Dale Mitchell Park	W 9–4	Crossland (2–2)	Thompson (2–3)	None	4,067	24–9	6–7	
April 12	SECN+	No. 17 Vanderbilt	No. 19	L. Dale Mitchell Park	W 14–0^{7}	K. Witherspoon (6–2)	Bowker (2–2)	None	5,051	25–9	7–7	
April 13	SECN+	No. 17 Vanderbilt	No. 19	L. Dale Mitchell Park	L 2–13^{7}	Fennell (3–0)	M. Witherspoon (2–4)	Hawks (4)	3,021	25–10	7–8	
Bedlam Series
April 15	ESPN+	at Oklahoma State*	No. 18	O'Brate Stadium; Stillwater, OK	W 11–1^{8}	Hitt (1–0)	Ure (1–4)	None	6,810	26–10	—	
Peace Pipe Series
April 17	SECN+	at Missouri	No. 18	Taylor Stadium; Columbia, MO	W 17–4^{8}	Crossland (3–2)	Lucas (1–4)	None	1,431	27–10	8–8	
April 18 (DH 1)	SECN+	at Missouri	No. 18	Taylor Stadium	W 17–7^{8}	K. Witherspoon (7–2)	Jacobi (2–6)	None		28–10	9–8	
April 18 (DH 2)	SECN+	at Missouri	No. 18	Taylor Stadium	W 12–1^{7}	M. Witherspoon (3–4)	Neubeck (0–2)	None	1,331	29–10	10–8	
April 22	SECN+	Oral Roberts*	No. 14	L. Dale Mitchell Park	L 3–5	Rouse (2–1)	Catalino (2–1)	Floyd (1)	2,258	29–11	—	
April 24	ESPNU	at No. 10 Georgia	No. 14	Foley Field; Athens, GA	W 8–6	K. Witherspoon (8–2)	Curley (2–2)	Crooks (10)	3,042	30–11	11–8	
April 25	SECN+	at No. 10 Georgia	No. 14	Foley Field	L 9–10	Harris (3–0)	Crossland (3–3)	None	3,106	30–12	11–9	
April 26	SECN+	at No. 10 Georgia	No. 14	Foley Field	L 3–6	Davis II (4–0)	M. Witherspoon (3–5)	McLoughlin (1)	3,633	30–13	11–10	
April 29	SECN	Wichita State*	No. 21	L. Dale Mitchell Park	Canceled due to forecasted inclement weather							

May (3–6)
Date	TV	Opponent	Rank	Stadium	Score	Win	Loss	Save	Attendance	Overall	SEC	Source
May 2	SECN+	No. 23 Ole Miss	No. 21	L. Dale Mitchell Park	W 2–0	K. Witherspoon (9–2)	Elliott (6–3)	Crooks (11)	3,144	31–13	12–10	
May 3	SECN+	No. 23 Ole Miss	No. 21	L. Dale Mitchell Park	W 5–3	Crossland (4–3)	Maddox (5–4)	Crooks (12)	3,578	32–13	13–10	
May 4	SECN+	No. 23 Ole Miss	No. 21	L. Dale Mitchell Park	L 3–7	Morris (4–1)	M. Witherspoon (3–6)	None	3,105	32–14	13–11	
May 9	SECN	at Kentucky	No. 17	Kentucky Proud Park; Lexington, KY	L 3–4	Nove (1–2)	K. Witherspoon (9–3)	Gregersen (2)	4,446	32–15	13–12	
May 10	ESPNews	at Kentucky	No. 17	Kentucky Proud Park	L 5–8	McCay (5–0)	Crossland (4–4)	Walker (1)	4,137	32–16	13–13	
May 11	SECN+	at Kentucky	No. 17	Kentucky Proud Park	L 2–7	Cleaver (6–3)	M. Witherspoon (3–7)	None	3,706	32–17	13–14	
Red River Series
May 15	SECN+	No. 3 Texas		L. Dale Mitchell Park	L 4–7	Volantis (4–0)	Crooks (2–1)	None	3,577	32–18	13–15	
May 16	SECN+	No. 3 Texas		L. Dale Mitchell Park	W 8–3	Reid (4–1)	Grubbs (6–1)	Crooks (13)	5,177	33–18	14–15	
May 17	SECN+	No. 3 Texas		L. Dale Mitchell Park	L 1–9	Harrison (5–1)	M. Witherspoon (3–8)	Burns (4)	4,844	33–19	14–16	

Postseason (5–3)

SEC tournament (2–1)
Date	TV	Opponent	Seed	Stadium	Score	Win	Loss	Save	Attendance	Overall	SECT Record
May 20	SECN	vs. (13) Kentucky	12	Hoover Metropolitan Stadium; Hoover, AL	W 5–1	Hitt (2–0)	Rouse (4–2)	—	6,525	34–19	1–0
May 21	SECN	vs. (5) No. 10 Georgia	12	Hoover Metropolitan Stadium	W 3–2	Witherspoon (10–3)	Hoskins (1–2)	Crooks (14)	11,117	35–19	2–0
May 22	SECN	vs. (4) No. 9 Vanderbilt	12	Hoover Metropolitan Stadium	L 1–6	Thompson (5–5)	Crossland (4–5)	—	10,135	35–20	2–1

Chapel Hill Regional (3–2)
Date	TV	Opponent	Rank (Seed)	Stadium	Score	Win	Loss	Save	Attendance	Overall	Regional Record
May 30	ESPN+	vs. (3) Nebraska	(2)	Boshamer Stadium; Chapel Hill, NC	W 7–4	Witherspoon (4–8)	Brockett (4–4)	Crooks (15)	967	36–20	1–0
May 31	ESPNU	vs. (1) No. 1 North Carolina	(2)	Boshamer Stadium	L 5–11	Decaro (9–3)	Witherspoon (10–4)	—	4,029	36–21	1–1
June 1	ESPN+	vs. (3) Nebraska	(2)	Boshamer Stadium	W 17–1	Crossland (5–5)	Walsh (4–8)	—	809	37–21	2–1
June 1	ESPN+	vs. (1) No. 1 North Carolina	(2)	Boshamer Stadium	W 9–5	Hitt (3–0)	Johnson (2–1)	Crooks (16)	4,001	38–21	3–1
June 2	ESPNU	vs. (1) No. 1 North Carolina	(2)	Boshamer Stadium	L 4–14	Lynch (5–1)	Hensley (4–2)	McDuffie (7)	3,914	38–22	3–2

Legend: = Win = Loss = Canceled
Bold =Oklahoma team member * Non-conference game
Rankings are based on the team's current ranking in the D1Baseball poll.

== Record vs. conference opponents ==
Blank are not scheduled. Blue are home games, otherwise away.

2025 SEC baseball records Source: 2025 SEC baseball game results, 2025 SEC baseball schedule
Tm	W–L	ALA	ARK	AUB	FLA	UGA	KEN	LSU	MSU	MIZ	OKL	OMS	SCA	TEN	TEX	TAM	VAN	Tm	SR	SW
ALA	16–14		.	1–2	1–2	2–1	.	1–2	1–2	3–0	2–1	.	.	1–2	.	3–0	1–2	ALA	4–6	2–0
ARK	20–10	.		.	1–2	1–2	.	1–2	.	3–0	.	2–1	3–0	2–1	3–0	1–2	3–0	ARK	6–4	4–0
AUB	17–13	2–1	.		.	0–3	2–1	3–0	2–1	.	.	1–2	3–0	2–1	0–3	.	2–1	AUB	7–3	2–2
FLA	15–15	2–1	2–1	.		0–3	.	.	2–1	3–0	.	1–2	3–0	0–3	2–1	.	0–3	FLA	6–4	2–3
UGA	18–12	1–2	2–1	3–0	3–0		2–1	.	.	3–0	2–1	.	.	.	0–3	2–1	0–3	UGA	7–3	3–2
KEN	13–17	.	.	1–2	.	1–2		.	0–3	.	3–0	1–2	2–1	2–1	1–2	2–1	0–3	KEN	4–6	1–2
LSU	19–11	2–1	2–1	0–3	.	.	.		3–0	3–0	3–0	.	2–1	2–1	1–2	1–2	.	LSU	7–3	3–1
MSU	15–15	2–1	.	1–2	1–2	.	3–0	0–3		3–0	1–2	2–1	2–1	.	0–3	.	.	MSU	5–5	2–2
MIZ	3–27	0–3	0–3	.	0–3	0–3	.	0–3	0–3		0–3	0–3	.	.	0–3	3–0	.	MIZ	1–9	1–9
OKL	14–16	1–2	.	.	.	1–2	0–3	0–3	2–1	3–0		2–1	2–1	.	1–2	.	2–1	OKL	5–5	1–2
OMS	16–14	.	1–2	2–1	2–1	.	2–1	.	1–2	3–0	1–2		1–2	1–2	.	.	2–1	OMS	5–5	1–0
SCA	6–24	.	0–3	0–3	0–3	.	1–2	1–2	1–2	.	1–2	2–1		0–3	.	0–3	.	SCA	1–9	0–5
TEN	16–14	2–1	1–2	1–2	3–0	.	1–2	1–2	.	.	.	2–1	3–0		.	1–2	1–2	TEN	4–6	2–0
TEX	22–8	.	0–3	3–0	1–2	3–0	2–1	2–1	3–0	3–0	2–1	.	.	.		3–0	.	TEX	8–2	5–1
TAM	11–19	0–3	2–1	.	.	1–2	1–2	2–1	.	0–3	.	.	3–0	2–1	0–3		0–3	TAM	4–6	1–4
VAN	19–11	2–1	0–3	1–2	3–0	3–0	3–0	.	.	.	1–2	1–2	.	2–1	.	3–0		VAN	6–4	4–1
Tm	W–L	ALA	ARK	AUB	FLA	UGA	KEN	LSU	MSU	MIZ	OKL	OMS	SCA	TEN	TEX	TAM	VAN	Team	SR	SW

Updated for entire regular season.
Tie brkrs: LSU>VAN ARK common, OMS>TEN & OMS>ALA VAN common, TEN>ALA hd to hd, FLA>MSU hd to hd.

== Rankings ==
Ranking movements Legend: ██ Increase in ranking ██ Decrease in ranking — = Not ranked RV = Received votes т = Tied with team above or below
	Week																		
Poll	Pre	1	2	3	4	5	6	7	8	9	10	11	12	13	14	15	16	17	Final
Coaches'	25т	25т*	17	12	12	9т	9	9	19	16	13	21	16	RV	—	RV	RV*	RV*	RV
Baseball America	—	—	—	10	8	9	8	9	16	12	11	21	16	—	—	—	—	—	—
NCBWA†	30	RV	—	19	16	12	9	10	18	16	12	14	14	16	RV	RV	RV*	RV*	RV
D1Baseball	—	—	16	13	12	10	9	10	19	18	14	21	17	—	—	—	—	—	—
Perfect Game	20	20	12	12	9	8	8	9	22	21	16	24	13	23	—	—	—	—	—

† NCBWA ranks 30 teams in their preseason poll, but only ranks 25 teams weekly during the season.
* A new poll was not released for this week, so for comparison purposes, the previous week's ranking is inserted in this week's slot.
