= 2025 Ole Miss Rebels baseball team =

American college baseball team

2025 Ole Miss Rebels baseball

Oxford Regional, 3–2
- Conference: Southeastern Conference

Ranking
- Coaches: No. 15
- D1Baseball.com: No. 15
- Record: 43–21 (16–14 SEC)
- Head coach: Mike Bianco (25th season)
- Assistant coaches: Mike Clement; Carl Lafferty Joel Mangrum
- Home stadium: Swayze Field

2025 Southeastern Conference baseball standings
| | Conf. | | | | Overall |
| Team | W | | L | PCT | W | | L | PCT |
|---|---|---|---|---|---|---|---|---|
| No. 17 Texas ‍†‍‍^{y} | 22 | – | 8 | .733 | 44 | – | 14 | .759 |
| No. 3 Arkansas ‍‍‍^{y} | 20 | – | 10 | .667 | 50 | – | 15 | .769 |
| No. 1 LSU ‍‍‍^{y} | 19 | – | 11 | .633 | 53 | – | 15 | .779 |
| No. 18 Vanderbilt ‍‍‡‍^{y} | 19 | – | 11 | .633 | 43 | – | 18 | .705 |
| No. 19 Georgia ‍‍‍^{y} | 18 | – | 12 | .600 | 43 | – | 17 | .717 |
| No. 11 Auburn ‍‍‍^{y} | 17 | – | 13 | .567 | 41 | – | 20 | .672 |
| No. 21 Ole Miss ‍‍‍^{y} | 16 | – | 14 | .533 | 43 | – | 21 | .672 |
| No. 12 Tennessee ‍‍‍^{y} | 16 | – | 14 | .533 | 46 | – | 19 | .708 |
| Alabama ‍‍‍^{y} | 16 | – | 14 | .533 | 41 | – | 18 | .695 |
| Florida ‍‍‍^{y} | 15 | – | 15 | .500 | 39 | – | 22 | .639 |
| Mississippi State ‍‍‍^{y} | 15 | – | 15 | .500 | 36 | – | 23 | .610 |
| Oklahoma ‍‍‍^{y} | 14 | – | 16 | .467 | 38 | – | 22 | .633 |
| Kentucky ‍‍‍^{y} | 13 | – | 17 | .433 | 31 | – | 26 | .544 |
| Texas A&M ‍‍‍ | 11 | – | 19 | .367 | 30 | – | 26 | .536 |
| South Carolina ‍‍‍ | 6 | – | 24 | .200 | 28 | – | 29 | .491 |
| Missouri ‍‍‍ | 3 | – | 27 | .100 | 16 | – | 39 | .291 |
† – Conference champion ‡ – Tournament champion y – Invited to the NCAA Tournament; As of June 22, 2025; Rankings from D1Baseball

The 2025 Ole Miss Rebels baseball team represents the University of Mississippi during the 2025 NCAA baseball season. The Rebels play their home games at Swayze Field in Oxford, Mississippi.

== Previous season ==
Ole Miss baseball ended their regular season play with a 27-29 record, going 11-19 in Southeastern Conference play. For the first time in the Mike Bianco era, the Ole Miss Rebels have missed the NCAA Tournament in back-to-back seasons after losing in the first round of the SEC Tournament to instate rivals Mississippi State Bulldogs.

== Roster ==
2025 Ole Miss Rebels Roster
| Pitchers: 2 - Riley Maddox - Senior; 10 - Cade Townsend - Freshman; 14 - Cooper Johnson - Freshman; 16 - Brayden Jones - Junior; 17 - Will McCausland - Junior; 19 - Walker Hooks - Freshman; 21 - Mason Morris - Junior; 22 - Connor Spencer - Senior; 23 - Hudson Calhoun - Sophomore; 26 - Hunter Elliott - (redshirt) Junior; 29 - Ryne Rodriguez - Junior; 32 - Gunnar Dennis - Senior; 34 - Landon Waters - Junior; 35 - Owen Hancock - Freshman; 38 - Patrick Galle - Sophomore; 40 - JP Robertson - Sophomore; 43 - Cole Ketchum - (redshirt) Sophomore; 44 - Jake Reigert - Freshman; 45 - Mason Nichols - "Senior"; 47 - Sam Tookoian - Junior; 50 - Taylor Rabe - (redshirt) Freshman; 55 - Alex Canney - Senior | Catchers: 24 - Austin Fawley - Sophomore; 12 - Campbell Smithwick - Sophomore; 20 - Collin Reuter - Junior; Infielders: 1 - Brayden Randle - Sophomore; 3 - Luke Cheng - Senior; 6 - Owen Paino - Freshman; 7 - Luke Hill - Junior; 9 - Hayden Federico - Freshman; 25 - Ethan Surowiec - Freshman; 27 - Judd Utermark - Junior; 36 - Will Furniss - Junior | Outfielders: 4 - Mitchell Sanford - Senior; 18 - Ryan Moerman - Senior; 28 - Connor Chisolm - Senior; 37 - Brett Moseley - Freshman; 39 - Jackson Miller - Freshman; 51 - Isaac Humphrey - Senior | Utility Players: 8 - Tate Sirmans - Freshman |

=== Coaching staff ===
2025 Ole Miss Rebels Coaching Staff
| Name | Position |
|---|---|
| Mike Bianco | Head coach |
| Mike Clement | Assistant Coach (Hitting/3B) |
| Carl Lafferty | Assistant Coach (Recruiting) |
| Joel Mangrum | Assistant Coach (Pitching) |

== Schedule and results ==
2025 Ole Miss Rebels baseball game log (43–21)
Regular season (37–18)

February (8–1)
| Date | Opponent | Rank | Site/stadium | Score | Win | Loss | Save | TV | Attendance | Overall record | SEC record |
Shriners Children's College Showdown
| February 14 | vs. No. 21 Arizona | | Globe Life Field; Arlington, Texas | **W** 2–1 | **Elliott** (1–0) | McKinney (0–1) | **Spencer** (1) | FloSports | | 1–0 | — |
| February 15 | vs. No. 19 Texas | | Globe Life Field | **L** 0–10 (7) | Harrison (1–0) | **Maddox** (0–1) | | FloSports | | 1–1 | — |
| February 16 | vs. No. 15 Clemson | | Globe Life Field | **W** 15–5 (7) | **McCausland** (1–0) | LeGuernic (0–1) | | FloSports | | 2–1 | — |
| February 18 | Arkansas State | | Swayze Field; Oxford, Mississippi | **W** 4–2 (10) | **Dennis** (1–0) | Allen (0–1) | | SECN+ | 8,794 | 3–1 | — |
| February 21 | Eastern Kentucky | | Swayze Field | **W** 8–0 | **Elliott** (2–0) | Walton (0–2) | **Morris** (1) | SECN+ | 8,882 | 4–1 | — |
| February 22 | Eastern Kentucky | | Swayze Field | **W** 9–4 | **Maddox** (1–1) | Gagen (0–1) | | SECN+ | 9,172 | 5–1 | — |
| February 23 | Eastern Kentucky | | Swayze Field | **W** 9–3 | **Nichols** (1–0) | Underhill (0–1) | | SECN+ | 8,824 | 6–1 | — |
| February 25 | No. 22 Southern Miss | No. 24 | Swayze Field | **W** 15–8 | **Jones** (1–0) | English (0–1) | | SECN+ | 10,455 | 7–1 | — |
| February 28 | Wright State | No. 24 | Swayze Field | **W** 9–1 | **Elliott** (3–0) | Paige (0–2) | | SECN+ | 9,792 | 8–1 | — |

March (13–5)
| Date | Opponent | Rank | Site/stadium | Score | Win | Loss | Save | TV | Attendance | Overall record | SEC record |
|---|---|---|---|---|---|---|---|---|---|---|---|
| March 1 | Wright State | No. 24 | Swayze Field | **W** 8–3 | **Maddox** (2–1) | Heilman (0–2) | | SECN+ | 10,099 | 9–1 | — |
| March 2 | Wright State | No. 24 | Swayze Field | **W** 7–3 | **Morris** (1–0) | Allen (1–1) | | SECN+ | 8,819 | 10–1 | — |
| March 4 | Southeastern Louisiana | No. 17 | Swayze Field | Canceled due to inclement weather | | | | | | | |
| March 5 | Murray State | No. 17 | Swayze Field | **W** 8–7 (10) | **Hooks** (1–0) | Wajda (1–1) | | SECN+ | 8,504 | 11–1 | — |
| March 7 | Jacksonville State | No. 17 | Swayze Field | **W** 7–4 | **Morris** (2–0) | Arndt (0–1) | **Spencer** (2) | SECN+ | 8,827 | 12–1 | — |
| March 8 | Jacksonville State | No. 17 | Swayze Field | **W** 12–4 | **Maddox** (3–1) | Phipps (1–1) | **Hooks** (1) | SECN+ | 8,972 | 13–1 | — |
| March 9 | Jacksonville State | No. 17 | Swayze Field | **W** 13–2 (8) | **Waters** (1–0) | Bonaparte (1–2) | | SECN+ | 8,596 | 14–1 | — |
| March 11 | at South Alabama | No. 13 | Eddie Stanky Field; Mobile, Alabama | **L** 5–14 | Smith (2–0) | **Rabe** (0–1) | Brooks (1) | ESPN+ | 2,893 | 14–2 | — |
| March 14 | No. 3 Arkansas | No. 13 | Swayze Field | **W** 10–6 | **Elliott** (4–0) | Root (2–1) | | SECN+ | 9,090 | 15–2 | 1–0 |
| March 15 | No. 3 Arkansas | No. 13 | Swayze Field | **L** 3–12 | Coil (1–0) | **Maddox** (3–2) | Jimenez (1) | SECN+ | 9,304 | 15–3 | 1–1 |
| March 16 | No. 3 Arkansas | No. 13 | Swayze Field | **L** 9–12 | Wiggins (1–0) | **Spencer** (0–1) | | SECN+ | 9,164 | 15–4 | 1–2 |
| March 18 | vs. No. 19 Southern Miss | No. 18 | Trustmark Park; Pearl, Mississippi | **L** 2–6 | Best (1–1) | **Dennis** (1–1) | Allen (1) | ESPN+ | 3,498 | 15–5 | — |
| March 21 | at Missouri | No. 18 | Taylor Stadium; Columbia, Missouri | **W** 9–6 | **Morris** (3–0) | Jacobi (2–2) | | SECN+ | 1,178 | 16–5 | 2–2 |
| March 22 | at Missouri | No. 18 | Taylor Stadium | **W** 17–10 | **Canney** (1–0) | Lucas (1–2) | | SECN+ | 1,532 | 17–5 | 3–2 |
| March 23 | at Missouri | No. 18 | Taylor Stadium | **W** 14–6 | **Nichols** (2–0) | Green (0–1) | **McCausland** (1) | SEC Network | 1,237 | 18–5 | 4–2 |
| March 25 | Memphis | No. 15 | Swayze Field | **W** 7–5 | **Calhoun** (1–0) | Pittman (0–1) | **Waters** (1) | SECN+ | 9,507 | 19–5 | — |
| March 27 | Florida | No. 15 | Swayze Field | **W** 7–5 | **Elliott** (5–0) | McNeillie (2–1) | **Jones** (1) | ESPNU | 9,867 | 20–5 | 5–2 |
| March 28 (DH) | Florida | No. 15 | Swayze Field | **W** 10–9 | **Calhoun** (2–0) | Barberi (1–1) | | SECN+ | 9,504 | 21–5 | 6–2 |
| March 28 (DH) | Florida | No. 15 | Swayze Field | **L** 8–11 | McNeillie (3–1) | **Jones** (1–1) | Barlow (1) | SECN+ | 9,576 | 21–6 | 6–3 |

April (11–7)
| Date | Opponent | Rank | Site/stadium | Score | Win | Loss | Save | TV | Attendance | Overall record | SEC record |
|---|---|---|---|---|---|---|---|---|---|---|---|
| April 1 | Jackson State | No. 9 | Swayze Field | **W** 18–7 (7) | **Hancock** (1–0) | Lourens (0–2) | | SECN+ | 8,802 | 22–6 | — |
| April 4 (DH) | at Kentucky | No. 9 | Kentucky Proud Park; Lexington, Kentucky | **L** 4–5 (10) | McCoy (1–0) | **Morris** (3–1) | | SECN+ | | 22–7 | 6–4 |
| April 4 (DH) | at Kentucky | No. 9 | Kentucky Proud Park | **W** 3–1 | **McCausland** (2–0) | Byers (2–1) | | SECN+ | 2,949 | 23–7 | 7–4 |
| April 5 | at Kentucky | No. 9 | Kentucky Proud Park | **W** 5–4 (12) | **Waters** (2–0) | Hogan (0–1) | **Canney** (1) | SECN+ | 3,082 | 24–7 | 8–4 |
| April 8 | at Memphis | No. 6 | FedExPark; Memphis, Tennessee | **W** 10–0 (7) | **Dennis** (2–1) | Cox (0–2) | | ESPN+ | 1,404 | 25–7 | — |
| April 9 | Alcorn State | No. 6 | Swayze Field | **W** 29–1 (7) | **Townsend** (1–0) | Dews (2–4) | | SECN+ | 8,612 | 26–7 | — |
| April 11 | No. 5 Tennessee | No. 6 | Swayze Field | **L** 2–3 | Doyle (6–1) | **Elliott** (5–1) | Loy (1) | SECN+ | 11,818 | 26–8 | 8–5 |
| April 12 | No. 5 Tennessee | No. 6 | Swayze Field | **W** 8–5 | **Maddox** (4–2) | Phillips (2–2) | **Spencer** (3) | SECN+ | 11,790 | 27–8 | 9–5 |
| April 13 | No. 5 Tennessee | No. 6 | Swayze Field | **L** 8–10 | Snead (3–0) | **Jones** (1–2) | None | SEC Network | 10,333 | 27–9 | 9–6 |
| April 15 | Little Rock | No. 11 | Swayze Field | **L** 3–7 | Van Cleve (2–2) | **Canney** (1–1) | None | SECN+ | 8,933 | 27–10 | — |
| April 17 | at South Carolina | No. 11 | Founders Park; Columbia, South Carolina | **L** 2–3 | Stone (2–4) | **Elliott** (5–2) | None | SECN+ | 7,523 | 27–11 | 9–7 |
| April 18 | at South Carolina | No. 11 | Founders Park | **L** 2–7 | McCoy (4–3) | **Maddox** (4–3) | Crowther (1) | SECN+ | 7,256 | 27–12 | 9–8 |
| April 19 | at South Carolina | No. 11 | Founders Park | **W** 12–2 (7) | **Nichols** (3–0) | Evans Jr. (3–2) | None | SECN+ | 7,720 | 28–12 | 10–8 |
| April 22 | vs. Mississippi State | No. 23 | Trustmark Park | **W** 8–7 (10) | **Calhoun** (3–0) | Dotson (0–1) | None | SECN+ | | 29–12 | — |
| April 25 | No. 9 Vanderbilt | No. 23 | Swayze Field | **W** 8–3 | **Hunter** (6–2) | Thompson (3–4) | **McCausland** (2) | SECN+ | 9,159 | 30–12 | 11–8 |
| April 26 | No. 9 Vanderbilt | No. 23 | Swayze Field | **W** 7–1 | **Maddox** (5–3) | Bowker (2–3) | None | SEC Network | 9,693 | 31–12 | 12–8 |
| April 27 | No. 9 Vanderbilt | No. 23 | Swayze Field | **L** 0–13 (7) | Fennell (5–0) | **Nichols** (3–1) | None | SECN+ | 9,111 | 31–13 | 12–9 |
| April 29 | Austin Peay | No. 23 | Swayze Field | **W** 6–3 | **Waters** (3–0) | Cox (3–1) | **Spencer** (4) | SECN+ | 9,032 | 32–13 | — |

May (4–5)
| Date | Opponent | Rank | Site/stadium | Score | Win | Loss | Save | TV | Attendance | Overall record | SEC record |
|---|---|---|---|---|---|---|---|---|---|---|---|
| May 2 | at No. 21 Oklahoma | No. 23 | L. Dale Mitchell Baseball Park; Norman, Oklahoma | **L** 0–2 | K. Witherspoon (9–2) | **Elliott** (6–3) | Crooks (11) | SECN+ | 3,144 | 32–14 | 12–10 |
| May 3 | at No. 21 Oklahoma | No. 23 | L. Dale Mitchell Baseball Park | **L** 3–5 | Crossland (4–3) | **Maddox** (5–4) | Crooks (12) | SECN+ | 3,578 | 32–15 | 12—11 |
| May 4 | at No. 21 Oklahoma | No. 23 | L. Dale Mitchell Baseball Park | **W** 7–3 | **Morris** (4–1) | M. Witherspoon (3–6) | None | SECN+ | 3,105 | 33–15 | 13–11 |
| May 9 (DH) | at Mississippi State | No. 24 | Dudy Noble Field, Polk–DeMent Stadium; Starkville, Mississippi | **W** 10–4 | **Elliott** (7–3) | Kohn (5–3) | None | SECN+ | 14,468 | 34–15 | 14–11 |
| May 9 (DH) | at Mississippi State | No. 24 | Dudy Noble Field, Polk–DeMent Stadium | **L** 1–4 | Siary (2–1) | **Maddox** (5–5) | None | SEC Network | 14,468 | 34–16 | 14–12 |
| May 10 | at Mississippi State | No. 24 | Dudy Noble Field, Polk–DeMent Stadium | **L** 5–6 | Ligon (5–5) | **Nichols** (3–2) | McPherson (2) | SECN+ | 11,641 | 34–17 | 14–13 |
| May 13 | UT Martin | | Swayze Field | **W** 11–5 | **Dennis** (3–1) | Nunn (0–3) | None | SECN+ | 8,750 | 35–17 | — |
| May 15 | No. 6 Auburn | | Swayze Field | **W** 9–2 | **Elliott** (8–3) | Tilly (3–2) | None | SECN+ | 8,947 | 36–17 | 15–13 |
| May 16 | No. 6 Auburn | | Swayze Field | **W** 15–11 | **Morris** (5–1) | Dutton (6–3) | None | SECN+ | 9,036 | 37–17 | 16–13 |
| May 17 | No. 6 Auburn | | Swayze Field | **L** 8–13 | Hetzler (2–0) | **Rodriguez** (0–1) | None | SECN+ | 9,153 | 37–18 | 16–14 |

Postseason (3–1)

SEC tournament (3–1)
| Date | Opponent | Rank | Site/stadium | Score | Win | Loss | Save | TV | Attendance | Overall record | SECT record |
|---|---|---|---|---|---|---|---|---|---|---|---|
| May 21 | vs. (10) No. 15 Florida | (7) No. 17 | Hoover Metropolitan Stadium; Hoover, Alabama | **W** 3–1 | **Elliott** (9–3) | Peterson (8–3) | **Spencer** (5) | SECN | | 38–18 | 1–0 |
| May 23 | vs. (2) No. 5 Arkansas | (7) No. 17 | Hoover Metropolitan Stadium | **W** 5–2 | **Maddox** (6–5) | Root (6–5) | **Spencer** (6) | SECN | | 39–18 | 2–0 |
| May 24 | vs. (3) No. 1 LSU | (7) No. 17 | Hoover Metropolitan Stadium | **W** 2–0 | **Dennis** (4–1) | Noot (2–1) | **Spencer** (7) | SECN | 14,775 | 40–18 | 3–0 |
| May 25 | vs. (4) No. 9 Vanderbilt | (7) No. 17 | Hoover Metropolitan Stadium | **L** 2–3 | Guth (4–0) | **Hooks** (1–1) | Hawks (1) | ESPN2 | 13,518 | 40–19 | 3–1 |

Oxford Regional (3–2)
| Date | Opponent | Rank | Site/stadium | Score | Win | Loss | Save | TV | Attendance | Overall record | NCAA record |
|---|---|---|---|---|---|---|---|---|---|---|---|
| May 30 | (4) Murray State | (1) No. 15 | Swayze Field | **L** 6–9 | Hustedde (2–0) | **McCausland** (2–1) | Kelham (1) | ESPN+ | 11,925 | 40–20 | 0–1 |
| May 31 | (3) Western Kentucky | (1) No. 15 | Swayze Field | **W** 8–6 | **Elliott** (10–3) | Hall (7–2) | None | ESPN+ | 11,703 | 41–20 | 1–1 |
| June 1 | (2) No. 18 Georgia Tech | (1) No. 15 | Swayze Field | **W** 11–9 | **McCausland** (3–1) | Patel (11–2) | **Spencer** (1) | SECN | 11,620 | 42–20 | 2–1 |
| June 1 | (4) Murray State | (1) No. 15 | Swayze Field | **W** 19–8 | **Rodriguez** (1–1) | Elmy (6–2) | None | ESPN+ | 11,617 | 43–20 | 3–1 |
| June 2 | (4) Murray State | (1) No. 15 | Swayze Field | **L** 11–12 | Schutte (8–3) | **Hooks** (1–2) | Kelham (1) | SECN | 11,905 | 43–21 | 3–2 |

- Win
- Loss
- Postponement
- Bold: Ole Miss player
- Rankings from D1Baseball.com.
- (#) Tournament seedings in parentheses.

== Record vs. conference opponents ==
Blank are not scheduled. Blue are home games, otherwise away.

2025 SEC baseball records Source: 2025 SEC baseball game results, 2025 SEC baseball schedule
| Tm | W–L | ALA | ARK | AUB | FLA | UGA | KEN | LSU | MSU | MIZ | OKL | OMS | SCA | TEN | TEX | TAM | VAN | Tm | SR | SW |
|---|---|---|---|---|---|---|---|---|---|---|---|---|---|---|---|---|---|---|---|---|
| ALA | 16–14 | | . | 1–2 | 1–2 | 2–1 | . | 1–2 | 1–2 | 3–0 | 2–1 | . | . | 1–2 | . | 3–0 | 1–2 | ALA | 4–6 | 2–0 |
| ARK | 20–10 | . | | . | 1–2 | 1–2 | . | 1–2 | . | 3–0 | . | 2–1 | 3–0 | 2–1 | 3–0 | 1–2 | 3–0 | ARK | 6–4 | 4–0 |
| AUB | 17–13 | 2–1 | . | | . | 0–3 | 2–1 | 3–0 | 2–1 | . | . | 1–2 | 3–0 | 2–1 | 0–3 | . | 2–1 | AUB | 7–3 | 2–2 |
| FLA | 15–15 | 2–1 | 2–1 | . | | 0–3 | . | . | 2–1 | 3–0 | . | 1–2 | 3–0 | 0–3 | 2–1 | . | 0–3 | FLA | 6–4 | 2–3 |
| UGA | 18–12 | 1–2 | 2–1 | 3–0 | 3–0 | | 2–1 | . | . | 3–0 | 2–1 | . | . | . | 0–3 | 2–1 | 0–3 | UGA | 7–3 | 3–2 |
| KEN | 13–17 | . | . | 1–2 | . | 1–2 | | . | 0–3 | . | 3–0 | 1–2 | 2–1 | 2–1 | 1–2 | 2–1 | 0–3 | KEN | 4–6 | 1–2 |
| LSU | 19–11 | 2–1 | 2–1 | 0–3 | . | . | . | | 3–0 | 3–0 | 3–0 | . | 2–1 | 2–1 | 1–2 | 1–2 | . | LSU | 7–3 | 3–1 |
| MSU | 15–15 | 2–1 | . | 1–2 | 1–2 | . | 3–0 | 0–3 | | 3–0 | 1–2 | 2–1 | 2–1 | . | 0–3 | . | . | MSU | 5–5 | 2–2 |
| MIZ | 3–27 | 0–3 | 0–3 | . | 0–3 | 0–3 | . | 0–3 | 0–3 | | 0–3 | 0–3 | . | . | 0–3 | 3–0 | . | MIZ | 1–9 | 1–9 |
| OKL | 14–16 | 1–2 | . | . | . | 1–2 | 0–3 | 0–3 | 2–1 | 3–0 | | 2–1 | 2–1 | . | 1–2 | . | 2–1 | OKL | 5–5 | 1–2 |
| OMS | 16–14 | . | 1–2 | 2–1 | 2–1 | . | 2–1 | . | 1–2 | 3–0 | 1–2 | | 1–2 | 1–2 | . | . | 2–1 | OMS | 5–5 | 1–0 |
| SCA | 6–24 | . | 0–3 | 0–3 | 0–3 | . | 1–2 | 1–2 | 1–2 | . | 1–2 | 2–1 | | 0–3 | . | 0–3 | . | SCA | 1–9 | 0–5 |
| TEN | 16–14 | 2–1 | 1–2 | 1–2 | 3–0 | . | 1–2 | 1–2 | . | . | . | 2–1 | 3–0 | | . | 1–2 | 1–2 | TEN | 4–6 | 2–0 |
| TEX | 22–8 | . | 0–3 | 3–0 | 1–2 | 3–0 | 2–1 | 2–1 | 3–0 | 3–0 | 2–1 | . | . | . | | 3–0 | . | TEX | 8–2 | 5–1 |
| TAM | 11–19 | 0–3 | 2–1 | . | . | 1–2 | 1–2 | 2–1 | . | 0–3 | . | . | 3–0 | 2–1 | 0–3 | | 0–3 | TAM | 4–6 | 1–4 |
| VAN | 19–11 | 2–1 | 0–3 | 1–2 | 3–0 | 3–0 | 3–0 | . | . | . | 1–2 | 1–2 | . | 2–1 | . | 3–0 | | VAN | 6–4 | 4–1 |
| Tm | W–L | ALA | ARK | AUB | FLA | UGA | KEN | LSU | MSU | MIZ | OKL | OMS | SCA | TEN | TEX | TAM | VAN | Team | SR | SW |

Updated for entire regular season.
Tie brkrs: LSU>VAN ARK common, OMS>TEN & OMS>ALA VAN common, TEN>ALA hd to hd, FLA>MSU hd to hd.

== Rankings ==
Ranking movements Legend: ██ Increase in ranking ██ Decrease in ranking — = Not ranked RV = Received votes т = Tied with team above or below
| | Week | | | | | | | | | | | | | | | | | |
| Poll | Pre | 1 | 2 | 3 | 4 | 5 | 6 | 7 | 8 | 9 | 10 | 11 | 12 | 13 | 14 | 15 | 16 | Final |
|---|---|---|---|---|---|---|---|---|---|---|---|---|---|---|---|---|---|---|
| Coaches' | — | —* | — | 19 | 15 | 18 | 15 | 9 | 7 | 11 | 18т | 18 | 22 | 25 | 20 | 15 | | |
| Baseball America | — | — | — | 19 | 15 | 19 | 15 | 10 | 7 | 11 | 22 | 13 | 18 | 22 | 16 | 16* | | |
| NCBWA† | — | — | — | — | 23 | 24 | 20 | 13 | 9 | 12 | 19 | 12 | 15 | RV | RV | 17 | | |
| D1Baseball | — | — | 24 | 17 | 13 | 18 | 15 | 9 | 6 | 11 | 23 | 23 | 24 | — | 17 | 15 | | |
| Perfect Game | — | — | — | — | 23 | — | — | 16 | 8 | 12 | 18 | 16 | 20 | — | — | — | | |

† NCBWA ranks 30 teams in their preseason poll, but only ranks 25 teams weekly during the season.
* A new poll was not released for this week, so for comparison purposes, the previous week's ranking is inserted in this week's slot.
