= Blake Cyr =

Florida Gator baseball player

Florida Gators – No. 5
- Left Fielder
- Born: November 6, 2003 (age 22); Orlando, Florida, U.S.
- Bats: Right Throws: Right
- Stats at Baseball Reference

Teams
- Miami Hurricanes (2023-2024); Florida Gators (2025-Present)

Career highlights and awards
- 2023 Consensus First Team Freshman All-American; 2023 Freshman All-ACC Team

Blake Aaron Cyr (born November 6, 2003) is an American college baseball left fielder for the Florida Gators.

== Early life ==
Cyr was born in Orlando, Florida. He attended Windermere High School, where he played shortstop and was noted for his strong throwing arm and above-average power for his frame. Cyr batted .375 during his senior season. Having been committed to the Miami Hurricanes since he was in eight grade, he ignored draft interest and enrolled in college.

== College career ==
=== Miami ===
Cyr enrolled at Miami on June 3, 2024. In his freshman campaign, he played in 60 of the team's 63 games. Primarily as a second baseman, he slashed .305/.427/.620 to earn Freshman All-ACC and Freshman All-American honors. During a home elimination game against Louisiana in the 2023 NCAA Division I baseball tournament, Cyr hit a three-run home run in a game that the Hurricanes eventually won 8–5. They were eventually eliminated against Texas in a game where he went 1-for-4 and scored a run.

Ahead of his sophomore season, Cyr was projected to be the 20th best 2025 MLB draft prospect in college baseball. Instead of starting the season at second base, he would start at left field. He earned ACC Player of the Week honors after going 8-for-16 with 3 home runs and 11 RBI in a 4-game stretch. One of the home runs was a go-ahead grand slam to complete Miami's largest comeback win since 1992. Cyr suffered a season-ending thumb injury on April 5 while sliding into a base against Duke. He ended the season with only 25 games, having slashed .284/.397/.537.

Cyr entered the transfer portal and committed to Florida on June 4, 2024.

=== Florida ===
Considered one of the top 12 transfers in college baseball by NCAA.com, Cyr would be the opening day starter at left field for Florida. He reached base for 21 straight games to open the season, slashing .373/.469/.612 during that time. An injury crisis late in the season meant that he also saw very limited action as a second baseman. During the 2025 NCAA Division I Baseball Tournament, Cyr went 5-for-13 as the Gators were eliminated by Eastern Carolina.
