= 2025 Kentucky Wildcats baseball team =

American college baseball season

2025 Kentucky Wildcats baseball

Clemson Regional, 2–2
- Conference: Southeastern Conference
- Record: 31–26 (13–17 SEC)
- Head coach: Nick Mingione (9th season)
- Assistant coaches: Dan Roszel; Austin Cousino; Chase Slone
- Home stadium: Kentucky Proud Park

2025 Southeastern Conference baseball standings
	Conf.				Overall
Team	W		L	PCT	W		L	PCT
No. 17 Texas ‍†‍‍^{y}	22	–	8	.733	44	–	14	.759
No. 3 Arkansas ‍‍‍^{y}	20	–	10	.667	50	–	15	.769
No. 1 LSU ‍‍‍^{y}	19	–	11	.633	53	–	15	.779
No. 18 Vanderbilt ‍‍‡‍^{y}	19	–	11	.633	43	–	18	.705
No. 19 Georgia ‍‍‍^{y}	18	–	12	.600	43	–	17	.717
No. 11 Auburn ‍‍‍^{y}	17	–	13	.567	41	–	20	.672
No. 21 Ole Miss ‍‍‍^{y}	16	–	14	.533	43	–	21	.672
No. 12 Tennessee ‍‍‍^{y}	16	–	14	.533	46	–	19	.708
Alabama ‍‍‍^{y}	16	–	14	.533	41	–	18	.695
Florida ‍‍‍^{y}	15	–	15	.500	39	–	22	.639
Mississippi State ‍‍‍^{y}	15	–	15	.500	36	–	23	.610
Oklahoma ‍‍‍^{y}	14	–	16	.467	38	–	22	.633
Kentucky ‍‍‍^{y}	13	–	17	.433	31	–	26	.544
Texas A&M ‍‍‍	11	–	19	.367	30	–	26	.536
South Carolina ‍‍‍	6	–	24	.200	28	–	29	.491
Missouri ‍‍‍	3	–	27	.100	16	–	39	.291
† – Conference champion ‡ – Tournament champion y – Invited to the NCAA Tournament; As of June 22, 2025; Rankings from D1Baseball

The 2025 Kentucky Wildcats baseball team represents the University of Kentucky in the 2025 NCAA Division I baseball season. The Wildcats play their home games at Kentucky Proud Park.

== Previous season ==
The Wildcats finished 46–16, 22–8 in the SEC to tie for the SEC regular season championship. They lost to South Carolina in the SEC tournament. The Wildcats then competed in the NCAA tournament, winning the Lexington Regional and the Lexington Super Regional earning the program's first ever trip to the College World Series in Omaha. They went 1–2 in the CWS before being eliminated.

== Personnel ==
=== Roster ===
2025 Kentucky Wildcats roster
Pitchers: 0 – Jaxon Jelkin – (redshirt) Junior; 3 – Scott Rouse – Senior; 5 – Nic McCay – Senior; 13 – James McCoy – (redshirt) Junior; 14 – Cooper Robinson – Senior; 16 – Hayden Smith – (redshirt) Sophomore; 17 – Adam Hachman – (redshirt) Freshman; 20 – Tommy Skelding – (redshirt) Freshman; 21 – Chase Alderman – Sophomore; 22 – Cole Hentschel – Senior; 29 – Robert Hogan – Senior; 30 – Cameron Owens – Freshman; 31 – Oliver Boone – Sophomore; 36 – Nate Harris – Freshman; 37 – Logan Grubb – Freshman; 38 – Zak Spurrier – Freshman; 39 – Bradley Ferrell – Freshman; 40 – Simon Gregersen – Senior; 41 – Evan Byers – (redshirt) Senior; 42 – Khaleel Pratt – Freshman; 43 – Jackson Nove – Senior; 45 – Leighton Harris – Freshman; 46 – Ethan Walker – Junior; 48 – Ben Cleaver – Sophomore; 49 – Tristan Hunter – Freshman; 54 – Nile Adcock – Junior	Catchers: 4 – Raphael Pelletier – Senior; 7 – Devin Burkes – (redshirt) Fifth Year; 25 – Ryan Schwartz – Freshman; 35 – Nolan Belcher – Freshman; Infielders: 1 – Patrick Herrera – Senior; 6 – Tyler Bell – Freshman; 9 – Ethan Hindle – Sophomore; 10 – Luke Lawrence – Junior; 23 – Hudson Brown – (redshirt) Freshman; 24 – Dylan Koontz – Senior; 33 – Kyuss Gargett – Sophomore; 47 – Aidan Larkin – Freshman	Outfielders: 2 – Shaun Montoya – Senior; 8 – Griffin Cameron – Sophomore; 11 – Will Marcy – Senior; 19 – Eli Small – Sophomore; 34 – Carson Hansen – Junior; Utility: 12 – Cole Hage – Senior

=== Coaching staff ===
2025 Kentucky Wildcats coaching staff
Name	Position
Nick Mingione	Head coach
Dan Roszel	Assistant Coach/Pitching
Austin Cousino	Assistant Coach/Recruiting Coordinator
Chase Slone	Assistant Coach/Hitting

== Schedule and results ==
2025 Kentucky Wildcats baseball game log (29–24)
Regular season (29–24)

February (7–1)
Date	Opponent	Rank	Site/stadium	Score	Win	Loss	Save	TV	Attendance	Overall record	SEC record
February 14 (DH)	at Lipscomb*		Dugan Field	**W** 11–0^{7}	**McCay** (1–0)	Poindexter (0–1)	None	SECN+	322	1–0	–
February 14 (DH)	at Lipscomb*		Dugan Field	**L** 1–3	Ramos (1–0)	**Cleaver** (0–1)	Kantola (1)	SECN+	432	1–1	–
February 16	at Lipscomb*		Dugan Field	Canceled (weather)							
February 21	at Belmont*		E.S. Rose Park	**W** 2–1	**McCay** (2–0)	Pryor (0–2)	**Gregorson** (1)	TBA	365	2–1	–
February 22	at Belmont		E.S. Rose Park	**W** 12–0	**Cleaver** (1–1)	Ruzicka (0–1)	None	TBA	414	3–1	–
February 23	at Belmont		E.S. Rose Park	**W** 9–5	**Rouse** (1–0)	Brown (0–2)	None	TBA	452	4–1	–
February 25	Evansville*		Kentucky Proud Park	**W** 24–3^{7}	**N. Harris** (1–0)	James (0–1)	None	SECN+	2,088	5–1	–
February 26	Morehead State*		Kentucky Proud Park	**W** 8–2	**L. Harris** (1–0)	Wojtarowicz (0–1)	None	SECN+	2,980	6–1	–
February 28	Hofstra*		Kentucky Proud Park	**W** 7–5	**Byers** (1–0)	Bauer (0–2)	None	SECN+	2,770	7–1	–

March (10–8)
Date	Opponent	Rank	Site/stadium	Score	Win	Loss	Save	TV	Attendance	Overall record	SEC record
March 1	Hofstra*		Kentucky Proud Park	**W** 6–1	**Cleaver** (2–1)	Nemjo (0–2)	None	SECN+	2,389	8–1	–
March 2	Hofstra*		Kentucky Proud Park	**W** 9–1	**Rouse** (1–0)	Brown (0–2)	None	SECN+	2,310	9–1	–
March 4	at Eastern Kentucky*		Turkey Hughes Field	**W** 16–0^{7}	**N. Harris** (2–0)	Lawson (0–1)	None	ESPN+	1,187	10–1	–
March 5	Eastern Kentucky*		Kentucky Proud Park	Canceled (weather)							
March 7	Wofford*		Kentucky Proud Park	**W** 12–2^{7}	**McCay** (3–0)	Little (2–1)	None	SECN+	2,456	11–1	–
March 8	Wofford*		Kentucky Proud Park	**L** 5–12	Davis (3–0)	**Nove** (0–1)	None	SECN+	2,535	11–2	–
March 9	Wofford*		Kentucky Proud Park	**W** 2–1	**Rouse** (3–0)	Laughlin (1–1)	None	SECN+	2,689	12–2	–
March 11	Northern Illinois		Kentucky Proud Park	**W** 9–2	**N. Harris** (3–0)	Micklinghoff (0–1)	None	SECN+	3,912	13–2	–
March 14	at No. 4 Georgia		Foley Field; Athens, GA	**L** 6–12	Radtke (3–0)	**Nove** (0–2)	None	SECN+	3,633	13–3	0–1
March 15	at No. 4 Georgia		Foley Field	**W** 10–7	**Adcock** (1–0)	Hoskins (0–1)	**Rouse** (1)	SECN+	3,633	14–3	1–1
March 16	at No. 4 Georgia		Foley Field	**L** 10–17	Zeldin (1–0)	**Gregersen** (0–1)	None	SECN+	3,282	14–4	1–2
March 18	Murray State*		Kentucky Proud Park	**L** 4–5	Lebron (1–0)	**L. Harris** (1–1)	Zentko (1)	SECN+	2,529	14–5	–
March 21	No. 20 Auburn		Kentucky Proud Park	**L** 7–8	Carlson (2–1)	**Gregersen** (0–2)	Hetzler (2)	SECN+	3,226	14–6	1–3
March 22	No. 20 Auburn		Kentucky Proud Park	**L** 7–8^{11}	Carlson (3–1)	**Hentschel** (0–1)	None	SECN+	3,416	14–7	1–4
March 23	No. 20 Auburn		Kentucky Proud Park	**W** 6–0	**Byers** (2–0)	Chatterton (2–1)	**Skelding** (1)	SECN	2,700	15–7	2–4
March 25	Xavier*		Kentucky Proud Park	**L** 3–9	Schmidt (1–2)	**N. Harris** (3–1)	None	SECN+	2,502	15–8	–
March 28	at Texas A&M		Blue Bell Park; College Station, TX	**L** 7–9	Moss (3–2)	**Adcock** (1–1)	None	SECN+	5,952	15–9	2–5
March 29	at Texas A&M		Blue Bell Park	**W** 14–11	**Skelding** (1–0)	Lamkin (1–3)	**McCoy** (1)	SECN+	7,317	16–9	3–5
March 30	at Texas A&M		Blue Bell Park	**W** 10–5	**Cleaver** (3–1)	Patton (2–3)	None	SECN+	5,643	17–9	4–5

April (8–8)
Date	Opponent	Rank	Site/stadium	Score	Win	Loss	Save	TV	Attendance	Overall record	SEC record
April 4 (DH 1)	No. 9 Ole Miss		Kentucky Proud Park	**W** 5–4^{10}	**McCoy** (1–0)	Morris (3–1)	None	SECN+		18–9	5–5
April 4 (DH 2)	No. 9 Ole Miss		Kentucky Proud Park	**L** 1–3	McCausland (2–0)	**Byers** (2–1)	None	SECN	2,949	18–10	5–6
April 5	No. 9 Ole Miss		Kentucky Proud Park	**L** 4–5^{12}	Waters (2–0)	**Hogan** (0–1)	Canney (1)	SECN+	3,082	18–11	5–7
April 8	at No. 14 Louisville*		Jim Patterson Stadium; Louisville, KY	**L** 3–4^{10}	Brown (4–3)	**Hentschel** (0–2)	None	ACCN	3,680	18–12	–
April 11	No. 2 Texas		Kentucky Proud Park	**L** 3–6	Grubbs (5–0)	**Rouse** (3–1)	Volantis (8)	SECN+	3,134	18–13	5–8
April 12	No. 2 Texas		Kentucky Proud Park	**W** 5–4^{15}	**Hentschel** (1–2)	Burns (0–1)	None	SECN	3,586	19–13	6–8
April 13	No. 2 Texas		Kentucky Proud Park	**L** 4–5	Riojas (7–1)	**Cleaver** (3–2)	Saunier (1)	SECN	3,629	19–14	6–9
April 15	Miami (OH)*		Kentucky Proud Park	**W** 4–3	**Hentschel** (2–2)	Harajli (0–2)	None	SECN	2,768	20–14	–
April 18	at No. 4 Tennessee		Lindsey Nelson Stadium; Knoxville, TN	**L** 2–8	Doyle (7–1)	**N. Harris** (3–2)	None	SECN+	5,956	20–15	6–10
April 19	at No. 4 Tennessee		Lindsey Nelson Stadium	**W** 4–1	**McCay** (4–0)	Phillips (3–2)	**Nove** (1)	SECN+	5,801	21–15	7–10
April 20	at No. 4 Tennessee		Lindsey Nelson Stadium	**W** 8–2	**Cleaver** (4–2)	Kuhns (2–2)	None	SECN+	5,586	22–15	8–10
April 22	No. 19 Louisville*		Kentucky Proud Park	**W** 17–5^{7}	**Walker** (1–0)	Schlageter (2–1)	None	SECN+	6,415	23–15	–
April 26	South Carolina		Kentucky Proud Park	**W** 7–3	**N. Harris** (4–2)	Stone (2–5)	None	SECN+	4,134	24–15	9–10
April 26	South Carolina		Kentucky Proud Park	**L** 4–5	Crowther (2–0)	**Hentschel** (2–3)	None	SECN+	4,134	24–16	9–11
April 27	South Carolina		Kentucky Proud Park	**W** 11–5	**Cleaver** (5–2)	Eskew (0–2)	**McCoy** (2)	SECN+	4,292	25–16	10–11
April 29	at Western Kentucky*		Nick Denes Field; Bowling Green, KY	**L** 4–6	Peters (3–0)	**Walker** (1–1)	Hartman (1)	ESPN+	932	25–17	–

May (4–7)
Date	Opponent	Rank	Site/stadium	Score	Win	Loss	Save	TV	Attendance	Overall record	SEC record
May 3	at Mississippi State		Dudy Noble Field; Starkville, MS	**L** 4–14^{7}	Kohn (5–2)	**Adcock** (1–2)	Davis (1)	SECN+	13,970	25–18	10–12
May 3	at Mississippi State		Dudy Noble Field	**L** 5–6^{11}	Dotson (1–1)	**Gregersen** (0–3)	None	SECN+	13,970	25–19	10–13
May 4	at Mississippi State		Dudy Noble Field	**L** 1–6	Davis (2–2)	**Cleaver** (5–3)	None	SECN	10,635	25–20	10–14
May 9	No. 17 Oklahoma		Kentucky Proud Park	**W** 4–3	**Nove** (1–2)	K. Witherspoon (9–3)	**Gregersen** (2)	SECN+	4,446	26–20	11–14
May 10	No. 17 Oklahoma		Kentucky Proud Park	**W** 8–5	**McCay** (5–0)	Cade (4–4)	**Walker** (1)	ESPNews	4,137	27–20	12–14
May 11	No. 17 Oklahoma		Kentucky Proud Park	**W** 7–2	**Cleaver** (6–3)	M. Witherspoon (3–7)	None	SECN+	3,706	28–20	13–14
May 13	Northern Kentucky*		Kentucky Proud Park	**W** 6–1	**Rouse** (4–1)	Sackenheim (0–2)	**McCoy** (3)	SECN+	3,038	29–20	–
May 15	at No. 9 Vanderbilt		Hawkins Field; Nashville, TN	**L** 7–8	Guth (3–0)	**Gregersen** (0–4)	None	SECN+	3,802	29–21	13–15
May 16	at No. 9 Vanderbilt		Hawkins Field	**L** 8–9	McElvain (2–3)	**McCoy** (1–1)	None	SECN+	3,802	29–22	13–16
May 17	at No. 9 Vanderbilt		Hawkins Field	**L** 3–5	Fennell (6–0)	**Gregersen** (0–5)	None	SECN+	3,802	29–23	13–17

Postseason

SEC Tournament
Date	Opponent	Seed	Site/stadium	Score	Win	Loss	Save	TV	Attendance	Overall record	SECT Record
May 20	(12) Oklahoma	13	Hoover Metropolitan Stadium; Hoover, AL	**L** 1–5	Hitt (2–0)	**Rouse** (4–2)	None	SECN	6,525	29–24	0–1

Clemson Regional (2–1)
Date	Time (CT)	TV	Opponent	Rank (Seed)	Stadium	Score	Win	Loss	Save	Attendance	Overall record	Tournament Record	Box Score
May 30	12:00 p.m.	ESPNU	(2) West Virginia	(3)	Doug Kingsmore Stadium • Clemson, SC	**L** 3–4	Bassinger (7–1)	**Gregersen** (0–6)	None	5,288	29–25	0–1	
May 31	12:00 p.m.	ESPN2	(4) USC Upstate	(3)	Doug Kingsmore Stadium • Clemson, SC	**W** 7–3	**Walker** (2–1)	Kuskie (5–2)	None	5,248	30–25	1–1	
June 1	12:00 p.m.	ESPN	(1) Clemson	(3)	Doug Kingsmore Stadium • Clemson, SC	**W** 16-4	**N. Harris** (5–2)	Bell (0–2)	None	5,492	31–25	2–1	
June 1	6:00 p.m.	ESPN+	(2) West Virginia	(3)	Doug Kingsmore Stadium • Clemson, SC	**L** 13–14	Hudson (3–1)	**McCoy** (1–2)	None	5,330	31–26	2–2	

Legend: = Win = Loss = Canceled
Bold = Kentucky team member
Rankings are based on the team's current ranking in the D1Baseball poll.
*Denotes non-conference game

Schedule source:

== Record vs. conference opponents ==
Blank are not scheduled. Blue are home games, otherwise away.

2025 SEC baseball records Source: 2025 SEC baseball game results, 2025 SEC baseball schedule
Tm	W–L	ALA	ARK	AUB	FLA	UGA	KEN	LSU	MSU	MIZ	OKL	OMS	SCA	TEN	TEX	TAM	VAN	Tm	SR	SW
ALA	16–14		.	1–2	1–2	2–1	.	1–2	1–2	3–0	2–1	.	.	1–2	.	3–0	1–2	ALA	4–6	2–0
ARK	20–10	.		.	1–2	1–2	.	1–2	.	3–0	.	2–1	3–0	2–1	3–0	1–2	3–0	ARK	6–4	4–0
AUB	17–13	2–1	.		.	0–3	2–1	3–0	2–1	.	.	1–2	3–0	2–1	0–3	.	2–1	AUB	7–3	2–2
FLA	15–15	2–1	2–1	.		0–3	.	.	2–1	3–0	.	1–2	3–0	0–3	2–1	.	0–3	FLA	6–4	2–3
UGA	18–12	1–2	2–1	3–0	3–0		2–1	.	.	3–0	2–1	.	.	.	0–3	2–1	0–3	UGA	7–3	3–2
KEN	13–17	.	.	1–2	.	1–2		.	0–3	.	3–0	1–2	2–1	2–1	1–2	2–1	0–3	KEN	4–6	1–2
LSU	19–11	2–1	2–1	0–3	.	.	.		3–0	3–0	3–0	.	2–1	2–1	1–2	1–2	.	LSU	7–3	3–1
MSU	15–15	2–1	.	1–2	1–2	.	3–0	0–3		3–0	1–2	2–1	2–1	.	0–3	.	.	MSU	5–5	2–2
MIZ	3–27	0–3	0–3	.	0–3	0–3	.	0–3	0–3		0–3	0–3	.	.	0–3	3–0	.	MIZ	1–9	1–9
OKL	14–16	1–2	.	.	.	1–2	0–3	0–3	2–1	3–0		2–1	2–1	.	1–2	.	2–1	OKL	5–5	1–2
OMS	16–14	.	1–2	2–1	2–1	.	2–1	.	1–2	3–0	1–2		1–2	1–2	.	.	2–1	OMS	5–5	1–0
SCA	6–24	.	0–3	0–3	0–3	.	1–2	1–2	1–2	.	1–2	2–1		0–3	.	0–3	.	SCA	1–9	0–5
TEN	16–14	2–1	1–2	1–2	3–0	.	1–2	1–2	.	.	.	2–1	3–0		.	1–2	1–2	TEN	4–6	2–0
TEX	22–8	.	0–3	3–0	1–2	3–0	2–1	2–1	3–0	3–0	2–1	.	.	.		3–0	.	TEX	8–2	5–1
TAM	11–19	0–3	2–1	.	.	1–2	1–2	2–1	.	0–3	.	.	3–0	2–1	0–3		0–3	TAM	4–6	1–4
VAN	19–11	2–1	0–3	1–2	3–0	3–0	3–0	.	.	.	1–2	1–2	.	2–1	.	3–0		VAN	6–4	4–1
Tm	W–L	ALA	ARK	AUB	FLA	UGA	KEN	LSU	MSU	MIZ	OKL	OMS	SCA	TEN	TEX	TAM	VAN	Team	SR	SW

Updated for entire regular season.
Tie brkrs: LSU>VAN ARK common, OMS>TEN & OMS>ALA VAN common, TEN>ALA hd to hd, FLA>MSU hd to hd.

== Rankings ==
Ranking movements Legend: ██ Increase in ranking ██ Decrease in ranking — = Not ranked RV = Received votes
	Week																	
Poll	Pre	1	2	3	4	5	6	7	8	9	10	11	12	13	14	15	16	Final
Coaches'	24	24*	RV	RV	—	RV	RV	RV	—	—	RV	—	—	RV	—	—		
Baseball America	20	23	23	23	23	24	—	—	—	—	—	—	—	—	—	—		
NCBWA†	26	RV	RV	RV	RV	RV	RV	RV	RV	RV	RV	RV	RV	RV	RV	RV		
D1Baseball	—	—	—	—	—	—	—	—	—	—	—	—	—	—	—	—		
Perfect Game	—	—	—	RV	—	—	—	—	—	—	—	—	—	—	—	—		

† NCBWA ranks 30 teams in their preseason poll, but only ranks 25 teams weekly during the season.
* A new poll was not released for this week, so for comparison purposes, the previous week's ranking is inserted in this week's slot.
