= 2025 Murray State Racers baseball team =

American college baseball team

2025 Murray State Racers baseball

Missouri Valley Conference co-champions Missouri Valley Conference tournament champions Oxford Regional champions Durham Super Regional champions

College World Series, T–7th
- Conference: Missouri Valley Conference

Ranking
- Coaches: No. 11
- D1Baseball.com: No. 8
- Record: 44–17 (17–8 MVC)
- Head coach: Dan Skirka (7th season)
- Assistant coaches: Steve Adkins; Hunter Wolfe Anthony Ortega
- Home stadium: Reagan Field

2025 Missouri Valley Conference baseball standings
| | Conf. | | | | Overall |
| Team | W | | L | PCT | W | | L | PCT |
|---|---|---|---|---|---|---|---|---|
| Murray State ‍†‍‡‍^{y} | 17 | – | 8 | .680 | 42 | – | 14 | .750 |
| Missouri State ‍†‍‍ | 17 | – | 8 | .680 | 30 | – | 25 | .545 |
| Southern Illinois ‍‍‍ | 16 | – | 11 | .593 | 37 | – | 20 | .649 |
| UIC ‍‍‍ | 16 | – | 11 | .593 | 22 | – | 33 | .400 |
| Illinois State ‍‍‍ | 15 | – | 12 | .556 | 28 | – | 28 | .500 |
| Belmont ‍‍‍ | 13 | – | 14 | .481 | 26 | – | 34 | .433 |
| Indiana State ‍‍‍ | 12 | – | 15 | .444 | 24 | – | 31 | .436 |
| Bradley ‍‍‍ | 12 | – | 15 | .444 | 16 | – | 35 | .314 |
| Evansville ‍‍‍ | 10 | – | 17 | .370 | 17 | – | 37 | .315 |
| Valparaiso ‍‍‍ | 5 | – | 22 | .185 | 10 | – | 40 | .200 |
† – Conference champion ‡ – Tournament champion y – Invited to the NCAA Tournament; As of June 2, 2025; Rankings from D1Baseball

The 2025 Murray State Racers baseball team represented Murray State University in the 2025 NCAA Division I baseball season. The Racers played their home games at Reagan Field in Murray, Kentucky. The team was led by head coach Dan Skirka in his 7th season in the position.

The Racers won their first Missouri Valley Conference baseball tournament, earning a spot in the 2025 NCAA Division I baseball tournament. They won the Oxford Regional and Durham Super Regional, reaching their first College World Series in program history. They finished tied for 7th in the tournament after losing to UCLA and Arkansas.

== Schedule and results ==
2025 Murray State Racers baseball game log (44–15)
Regular season (35–13)

February (5–0)
| Date | Opponent | Rank | Site/stadium | Score | Win | Loss | Save | TV | Attendance | Overall record | MVC record |
|---|---|---|---|---|---|---|---|---|---|---|---|
| February 14 (DH-1) | vs. Western Illinois | | Capaha Field; Cape Girardeau, Missouri | **W** 10–5 | **Lyke** (1–0) | Tripure (0–1) | **Wajda** (1) | | 200 | 1–0 | — |
| February 14 (DH-2) | vs. Western Illinois | | Capaha Field | **W** 16–0 (7) | **Silva** (1–0) | Dubois (0–1) | | | 200 | 2–0 | — |
| February 24 | Western Kentucky | | Reagan Field; Murray, Kentucky | **W** 2–1 (12) | **Kelham** (1–0) | Wright (0–1) | | | 120 | 3–0 | — |
| February 25 | UT Martin | | Reagan Field | **W** 18–7 (7) | **Schutte** (1–0) | Stropshire (0–1) | | | 250 | 4–0 | — |
| February 28 | at Little Rock | | Gary Hogan Field; Little Rock, Arkansas | **W** 9–8 | **Wajda** (1–0) | Davis (1–1) | **McLendon** (1) | | 234 | 5–0 | — |

March (10–8)
| Date | Opponent | Rank | Site/stadium | Score | Win | Loss | Save | TV | Attendance | Overall record | MVC record |
|---|---|---|---|---|---|---|---|---|---|---|---|
| March 1 | at Little Rock | | Gary Hogan Field | **W** 21–2 | **Silva** (2–0) | Bunting (1–2) | | | 310 | 6–0 | — |
| March 2 | at Little Rock | | Gary Hogan Field | **W** 6–4 | **Zentko** (1–0) | Davis (1–2) | | | 267 | 7–0 | — |
| March 5 | at No. 17 Ole Miss | | Swayze Field; Oxford, Mississippi | **L** 7–8 (10) | Hooks (1–0) | **Wajda** (1–1) | | | 8,504 | 7–1 | — |
| March 7 | Western Illinois | | Reagan Field | **W** 10–9 | **McLendon** (1–0) | Humphrey (0–3) | | | 270 | 8–1 | — |
| March 8 | Western Illinois | | Reagan Field | **L** 3–5 | Buhl (2–0) | **Zentko** (1–0) | Stotlar (1) | | 400 | 8–2 | — |
| March 9 | Western Illinois | | Reagan Field | **L** 1–3 | Romano (1–0) | **Schutte** (1–1) | Stotlar (2) | | 300 | 8–3 | — |
| March 11 | Lindenwood | | Reagan Field | **W** 12–11 (10) | **Wajda** (2–1) | Subbert (0–1) | | | 300 | 9–3 | — |
| March 12 | Lindenwood | | Reagan Field | **W** 11–9 | **Elmy** (1–0) | Sell (0–1) | **McLendon** (2) | | 250 | 10–3 | — |
| March 14 | at Southern Indiana | | USI Baseball Field; Evansville, Indiana | **W** 5–4 | **Lyke** (2–0) | Gonzalez (0–2) | **Wajda** (2) | | 239 | 11–3 | — |
| March 16 (DH-1) | vs. Southern Indiana | | Marion Stadium; Marion, Illinois | **W** 17–6 (7) | **Silva** (3–0) | Kimball (2–3) | **McLendon** (3) | | 101 | 12–3 | — |
| March 16 (DH-2) | vs. Southern Indiana | | Marion Stadium | **L** 7–8 | Kennedy (2–0) | **Wajda** (2–2) | | | 101 | 12–4 | — |
| March 18 | at Kentucky | | Kentucky Proud Park; Lexington, Kentucky | **W** 5–4 | **Lebron** (1–0) | Harris (1–1) | **Zentko** (1) | | 2,529 | 13–4 | — |
| March 21 | Evansville | | Reagan Field | **L** 5–6 | Hansmann (1–0) | **Lyke** (2–1) | Peart (1) | | 150 | 13–5 | 0–1 |
| March 22 | Evansville | | Reagan Field | **L** 10–15 | Fieger (1–2) | **Wajda** (2–3) | | | 260 | 13–6 | 0–2 |
| March 23 | Evansville | | Reagan Field | **W** 9–5 | **Zentko** (2–1) | Byberg (0–3) | | | 260 | 14–6 | 1–2 |
| March 28 | at Illinois State | | Duffy Bass Field; Normal, Illinois | **W** 19–8 (7) | **Elmy** (2–0) | Harper (2–1) | | | 611 | 15–6 | 2–2 |
| March 29 (DH-1) | at Illinois State | | Duffy Bass Field | **L** 1–7 | Perry (2–3) | **Schutte** (1–2) | Donnison (1) | | 568 | 15–7 | 2–3 |
| March 29 (DH-1) | at Illinois State | | Duffy Bass Field | **L** 10–13 | Rybarczyk (1–0) | **Silva** (3–1) | | | 568 | 15–8 | 2–4 |

April (15–3)
| Date | Opponent | Rank | Site/stadium | Score | Win | Loss | Save | TV | Attendance | Overall record | MVC record |
|---|---|---|---|---|---|---|---|---|---|---|---|
| April 1 | North Alabama | | Reagan Field | **W** 5–3 | **Ugo** (1–0) | Howard (0–2) | **Lebron** (1) | | 250 | 16–8 | — |
| April 6 | Bradley | | Capaha Field^{†} | **W** 5–0 | **Schutte** (2–2) | Lutz (1–6) | | | 120 | 17–8 | 3–4 |
| April 7 (DH-1) | Bradley | | Capaha Field^{†} | **W** 12–0 (7) | **Silva** (4–1) | Vaughn (0–3) | | | 100 | 18–8 | 4–4 |
| April 7 (DH-2) | Bradley | | Capaha Field^{†} | **W** 3–2 | **Elmy** (3–0) | Politte (1–5) | **Zentko** (2) | | 100 | 19–8 | 5–4 |
| April 8 | Bellarmine | | Reagan Field | **W** 10–0 (7) | **Hustedde** (1–0) | Brower (1–1) | | | 115 | 20–8 | — |
| April 9 | Kentucky State | | Reagan Field | **W** 38–1 (7) | **Oakley** (1–0) | Wooldridge (1–4) | | | 300 | 21–8 | — |
| April 11 | UIC | | Reagan Field | **W** 3–1 | **Elmy** (4–0) | Schueler (2–6) | **Zentko** (3) | | 275 | 22–8 | 6–4 |
| April 12 | UIC | | Reagan Field | **L** 4–10 | Egan (2–1) | **Schutte** (2–3) | Hawkins (1) | | 350 | 22–9 | 6–5 |
| April 13 | UIC | | Reagan Field | **W** 11–9 | **Silva** (5–1) | Bak (0–3) | **Kelham** (1) | | 350 | 23–9 | 7–5 |
| April 15 | Southeast Missouri State | | Reagan Field | **W** 4–3 | **Oakley** (2–0) | Klein (0–2) | | | 300 | 24–9 | — |
| April 17 | at Valparaiso | | Emory G. Bauer Field; Valparaiso, Indiana | **W** 11–10 | **Lebron** (2–0) | Cottrill (0–2) | | | 127 | 25–9 | 8–5 |
| April 18 | at Valparaiso | | Emory G. Bauer Field | **W** 16–2 | **Schutte** (3–3) | Deliyannis (3–5) | | | 209 | 26–9 | 9–5 |
| April 19 | at Valparaiso | | Emory G. Bauer Field | **W** 5–1 | **Silva** (5–1) | Boynton (1–4) | | | 189 | 27–9 | 10–5 |
| April 22 | at North Alabama | | Mike D. Lane Field; Florence, Alabama | **W** 10–3 | **Oakley** (3–0) | Stogner (0–2) | | | 162 | 28–9 | — |
| April 25 | at Indiana State | | Bob Warn Field; Terre Haute, IN | **W** 9–3 | **Schutte** (4–3) | Suriel (0–4) | **Kelham** (2) | | 596 | 29–9 | 11–5 |
| April 26 | at Indiana State | | Bob Warn Field | **L** 1–11 | McEwen (6–2) | **Silva** (5–2) | | | 931 | 29–10 | 11–6 |
| April 27 | at Indiana State | | Bob Warn Field | **W** 2–1 | **Elmy** (5–0) | Parson (1–3) | **Kelham** (3) | | 831 | 30–10 | 12–6 |
| April 29 | at Southeast Missouri State | | Capaha Field; Cape Girardeau, Missouri | **L** 3–11 | Pennington (1–1) | **Parenteau** (0–1) | | | 465 | 30–11 | — |
^{†}Due to weather in Murray, all three games of the Bradley series were moved to a neutral site. Murray State still functioned as the home team and batted second in all three games.

May (5–2)
| Date | Opponent | Rank | Site/stadium | Score | Win | Loss | Save | TV | Attendance | Overall record | MVC record |
|---|---|---|---|---|---|---|---|---|---|---|---|
| May 2 | Southern Illinois | | Reagan Field | **W** 8–3 | **Schutte** (5–3) | Nigut (7–2) | **Kelham** (4) | | 300 | 31–11 | 13–6 |
| May 4 | Southern Illinois | | Reagan Field | **W** 3–2 (10) | **Kelham** (2–0) | Frizzi (3–3) | | | 300 | 32–11 | 14–6 |
| May 4 | Southern Illinois | | Reagan Field | **L** 0–11 (8) | Holguin (3–0) | **Elmy** (5–1) | | | 250 | 32–12 | 14–7 |
| May 9 | at Belmont | | E. S. Rose Park; Nashville, TN | **W** 7–3 | **Schutte** (6–3) | Ruzicka (5–3) | **Kelham** (5) | ESPN+ | 135 | 33–12 | 15–7 |
| May 10 | at Belmont | | E. S. Rose Park | **W** 8–1 | **Silva** (6–2) | Brown (2–5) | **Oakley** (1) | ESPN+ | 268 | 34–12 | 16–7 |
| May 11 | at Belmont | | E. S. Rose Park | **L** 3–4 (10) | Harden (2–2) | **Kelham** (2–1) | | ESPN+ | 192 | 34–13 | 16–8 |
| May 15 | Missouri State | | Reagan Field | **W** 16–5 (7) | **Schutte** (7–3) | Schaaf (4–2) | | ESPN+ | 200 | 35–13 | 17–8 |

Postseason (9–2)

MVC tournament (4–0)
| Date | Opponent | Seed | Site/stadium | Score | Win | Loss | Save | TV | Attendance | Overall record | MVCT record |
|---|---|---|---|---|---|---|---|---|---|---|---|
| May 21 | vs. (6) Belmont | (1) | Duffy Bass Field; Normal, Illinois | **W** 15–14 (11) | **Kelham** (3–1) | Brock (2–3) | | ESPN+ | | 36–13 | 1–0 |
| May 22 | vs. (3) Southern Illinois | (1) | Duffy Bass Field | **W** 10–5 | **Zentko** (3–1) | Nigut (7–4) | | ESPN+ | | 37–13 | 2–0 |
| May 23 | vs. (4) UIC | (1) | Duffy Bass Field | **W** 5–2 | **Elmy** (6–1) | Bak (2–4) | | ESPN+ | 110 | 38–13 | 3–0 |
| May 24 | vs. (2) Missouri State | (1) | Duffy Bass Field | **W** 10–5 | **Silva** (7–2) | Slater (3–3) | **Oakley** (2) | ESPN+ | 105 | 39–13 | 4–0 |

Oxford Regional (3–1)
| Date | Opponent | Seed | Site/stadium | Score | Win | Loss | Save | TV | Attendance | Overall record | Regional record |
|---|---|---|---|---|---|---|---|---|---|---|---|
| May 30 | vs. (1) No. 15 Ole Miss | (4) | Swayze Field; Oxford, Mississippi | **W** 9–6 | **Hustedde** (2–0) | McCausland (2–1) | **Kelham** (6) | ESPN+ | 11,925 | 40–13 | 1–0 |
| May 31 | vs. (2) No. 18 Georgia Tech | (4) | Swayze Field | **W** 13–11 | **Zentko** (4–1) | Campbell (2–1) | **Kelham** (7) | ESPN+ | 11,835 | 41–13 | 2–0 |
| June 1 | vs. (1) No. 15 Ole Miss | (4) | Swayze Field | **L** 8–19 | Rodriguez (1–1) | **Elmy** (6–2) | | ESPN+ | 11,617 | 41–14 | 2–1 |
| June 2 | vs. (1) No. 15 Ole Miss | (4) | Swayze Field | **W** 12–11 | **Schutte** (8–3) | Hooks (1–2) | **Kelham** (8) | SECN | 11,905 | 42–14 | 3–1 |

Durham Super Regional (2–1)
| Date | Opponent | Site/stadium | Score | Win | Loss | Save | TV | Attendance | Overall record | Super Regional record |
|---|---|---|---|---|---|---|---|---|---|---|
| June 7 | vs. Duke | Jack Coombs Field; Durham, North Carolina | **L** 4–7 | Proksch (4–3) | **Schutte** (8–4) | Easterly (5) | ESPNU | 2,686 | 42–15 | 3–2 |
| June 8 | vs. Duke | Jack Coombs Field | **W** 19–9 | **Silva** (8–2) | Johnson (4–4) | **Kelham** (9) | ESPNU | 2,689 | 43–15 | 4–2 |
| June 9 | vs. Duke | Jack Coombs Field | **W** 5–4 | **Kelham** (4–1) | Easterly (9–3) | | ESPN | 2,782 | 44–15 | 5–2 |

Men's College World Series (0–2)
| Date | Opponent | Site/stadium | Score | Win | Loss | Save | TV | Attendance | Overall record | CWS record |
|---|---|---|---|---|---|---|---|---|---|---|
| June 14 | vs. (15) No. 13 UCLA | Charles Schwab Field Omaha; Omaha, Nebraska | **L** 4–6 | May (8–3) | **Schutte** (8–5) | Hawk (1) | ESPN | 24,346 | 44–16 | 0–1 |
| June 16 | vs. (3) No. 6 Arkansas | Charles Schwab Field Omaha | **L** 0–3 | Wood (4–1) | **Silva** (9–3) | None | ESPN | 24,074 | 44–17 | 0–2 |

- Win
- Loss
- Postponement or cancellation
- Bold: Murray State player
- Rankings from D1Baseball.com.
- (#) Tournament seedings in parentheses.
