= 2025 Evansville Purple Aces baseball team =

American college baseball season

2025 Evansville Purple Aces baseball
- Conference: Missouri Valley Conference
- Record: 16–37 (10–17 MVC)
- Head coach: Wes Carroll (17th season)
- Hitting coach: Matt Wollenzin (3rd season)
- Pitching coach: Jarrett Blunt (1st season)
- Home stadium: Charles H. Braun Stadium

2025 Missouri Valley Conference baseball standings
| | Conf. | | | | Overall |
| Team | W | | L | PCT | W | | L | PCT |
|---|---|---|---|---|---|---|---|---|
| Murray State ‍†‍‡‍^{y} | 17 | – | 8 | .680 | 42 | – | 14 | .750 |
| Missouri State ‍†‍‍ | 17 | – | 8 | .680 | 30 | – | 25 | .545 |
| Southern Illinois ‍‍‍ | 16 | – | 11 | .593 | 37 | – | 20 | .649 |
| UIC ‍‍‍ | 16 | – | 11 | .593 | 22 | – | 33 | .400 |
| Illinois State ‍‍‍ | 15 | – | 12 | .556 | 28 | – | 28 | .500 |
| Belmont ‍‍‍ | 13 | – | 14 | .481 | 26 | – | 34 | .433 |
| Indiana State ‍‍‍ | 12 | – | 15 | .444 | 24 | – | 31 | .436 |
| Bradley ‍‍‍ | 12 | – | 15 | .444 | 16 | – | 35 | .314 |
| Evansville ‍‍‍ | 10 | – | 17 | .370 | 17 | – | 37 | .315 |
| Valparaiso ‍‍‍ | 5 | – | 22 | .185 | 10 | – | 40 | .200 |
† – Conference champion ‡ – Tournament champion y – Invited to the NCAA Tournament; As of June 2, 2025; Rankings from D1Baseball

The 2025 Evansville Purple Aces baseball team represents the University of Evansville during the 2025 NCAA Division I baseball season. The Purple Aces play their home games at Charles H. Braun Stadium.

== Previous season ==
The Purple Aces finished the 2024 season with a trip to the NCAA Knoxville Super Regional, winning one out of three games before being eliminated. Before that, Evansville won its first-ever NCAA Regional title while also winning the MVC Tournament. For the season, Evansville compiled a record of 39–26 and finished third in the MVC with a 17–10 mark.

== Offseason ==
=== Coaching changes ===
The following coaches left the program:

- Pitching coach and recruiting coordinator Tyler Shipley left for the director of pitching development position with Dallas Baptist.

The following coaches were hired:

- Brendan Hord was hired as a graduate assistant.

The following coaches were promoted:

- Graduate assistant Jarrett Blunt was promoted to pitching coach.
- Volunteer assistant Griffin McCormick was promoted to assistant coach.
- Hitting coach Matt Wollenzin was promoted to hitting coach and recruiting coordinator.

=== Departures ===
==== 2024 MLB draft ====
| Round | Pick | Player | Position | Team |
|---|---|---|---|---|
| Undrafted | | Kip Fougerousse | 3B | None |
| Undrafted | | Mark Shallenberger | OF | None |
| Undrafted | | Simon Scherry | SS | None |

==== Outgoing transfers ====
- RHP Matt Maloney transferred to Western Michigan.
- LHP Jack Taczy entered the transfer portal.

==== Retirements ====
- C Brendan Hord
- UTL Chase Hug
- LHP Jace Kressin
- LHP Donovan Schultz
- 3B Brent Widder

==== Other ====
- RHP Shane Harris signed with the Evansville Otters of the Frontier League (FL).
- RHP Jakob Meyer signed with the Evansville Otters of the Frontier League (FL).
- RHP Nick Smith signed with the Missoula PaddleHeads of the Pioneer League (PL).

=== Additions ===
==== Recruiting class ====
The following players signed National Letter of Intents to play for Evansville in 2025.

| Player | Hometown | High School |
Pitchers
| Isaac Boss | Weldon Spring, Missouri | Westminster Christian Academy (MO) |
| Jack Clevidence | Ankeny, Iowa | Ankeny (IA) |
| RJ James | Toronto, Ontario | Sir John A. Macdonald (ON) |
| Luc Lawler | Naperville, Illinois | Benet Academy (IL) |
| Conner Vander-Luitgaren | Bargersville, Indiana | Center Grove (IN) |
| Jack Wills | Shelbyville, Kentucky | Shelby County (KY) |
Hitters
| Davis Campbell | Liberty Township, Ohio | Cincinnati Country Day (OH) |
| Drew McConnell | Blue Springs, Missouri | Blue Springs (MO) |
| Mason McCue | Bourbonnais, Illinois | Bishop McNamara (IL) |
| Jake McGhee | Fenton, Missouri | Christian Brothers College (MO) |
| Ryan Seddon | Joliet, Illinois | St. Laurence (IL) |
| Cannon Vandever | Avon, Indiana | Avon (IN) |

==== Incoming transfers ====
- RHP Owen Byberg transferred in from Frontier.
- 3B Cole Iantomasi transferred in from Jefferson.
- C Matt Flaherty transferred in from Bellarmine.
- LHP Sam Sandy transferred in from Frontier.

==== New walk-ons ====
- None

== Preseason ==
=== Preseason MVC awards and honors ===
Starting pitcher Kenton Deverman was named to the Preseason All-MVC Team

Preseason All-MVC Team
| Player | No. | Position | Class |
| Kenton Deverman | 16 | SP | Sophomore |

=== Coaches poll ===
The MVC baseball coaches' poll was released on March 17, 2025.

MVC Coaches' Poll
| Predicted finish | Team | Votes (1st place) |
|---|---|---|
| 1 | Missouri State | 90 (5) |
| 2 | Southern Illinois | 86 (4) |
| 3 | Murray State | 84 (1) |
| 4 | Illinois State | 72 |
| T5 | Evansville | 49 |
| T5 | Indiana State | 49 |
| 7 | UIC | 46 |
| T8 | Belmont | 39 |
| T8 | Bradley | 39 |
| 10 | Valparaiso | 19 |

== Personnel ==
=== Roster ===
2025 Evansville Purple Aces baseball team
Players
Coaches

| # | Pos. | Name | B/T | Height | Weight | Year | Previous school | Home town |
|---|---|---|---|---|---|---|---|---|
| 0 | C | Kaleb Wilkey | R/R | 5 ft 9 in (1.75 m) | 185 lb (84 kg) | So | Lincoln-Way West HS | Manhattan, IL |
| 1 | OF | Aaron Nehls | R/R | 5 ft 10 in (1.78 m) | 170 lb (77 kg) | So | North HS | Evansville, IN |
| 2 | OF | Ty Rumsey | L/R | 5 ft 11 in (1.8 m) | 165 lb (75 kg) | Sr | North HS | Evansville, IN |
| 3 | INF | Drew McConnell | L/R | 5 ft 11 in (1.8 m) | 190 lb (86 kg) | Fr | Blue Springs HS | Blue Springs, MO |
| 4 | INF | Mason McCue | L/R | 5 ft 9 in (1.75 m) | 180 lb (82 kg) | Fr | Bishop McNamara HS | Bourbonnais, IL |
| 5 | INF | Drew Howard | R/R | 5 ft 11 in (1.8 m) | 175 lb (79 kg) | Jr | Forest Park HS | Ferdinand, IN |
| 7 | INF | Cal McGinnis | L/R | 5 ft 10 in (1.78 m) | 175 lb (79 kg) | Sr | Bradley | Kimberly, WI |
| 8 | OF | Charlie Longmeier | L/L | 5 ft 7 in (1.7 m) | 180 lb (82 kg) | So | Seymour HS | Seymour, IN |
| 9 | OF | Ryan Seddon | L/L | 5 ft 11 in (1.8 m) | 185 lb (84 kg) | Fr | St. Laurence HS | Joliet, IL |
| 10 | LHP | Jack Wills | L/L | 5 ft 9 in (1.75 m) | 170 lb (77 kg) | Fr | Shelby County HS | Shelbyville, KY |
| 11 | OF | Jake McGhee | L/L | 5 ft 7 in (1.7 m) | 180 lb (82 kg) | Fr | Christian Brothers College HS | Fenton, MO |
| 12 | RHP | Ethan Bell | R/R | 6 ft 1 in (1.85 m) | 165 lb (75 kg) | RS Jr | Southridge HS | Huntingburg, IN |
| 13 | RHP | Jack Clevidence | R/R | 6 ft 0 in (1.83 m) | 185 lb (84 kg) | Fr | Ankeny HS | Ankeny, IA |
| 14 | INF | Ben Stuart | R/R | 6 ft 3 in (1.91 m) | 200 lb (91 kg) | Sr | William Mason HS | Mason, OH |
| 15 | RHP | Max Hansmann | R/R | 6 ft 1 in (1.85 m) | 200 lb (91 kg) | Jr | York Community HS | Elmhurst, IL |
| 16 | LHP | Kenton Deverman | L/L | 6 ft 1 in (1.85 m) | 190 lb (86 kg) | So | Fort Zumwalt West HS | Dardenne Prairie, MO |
| 17 | RHP | Isaac Boss | R/R | 6 ft 3 in (1.91 m) | 210 lb (95 kg) | Fr | Westminster Christian Academy | Weldon Spring, MO |
| 18 | RHP | RJ James | R/R | 5 ft 10 in (1.78 m) | 190 lb (86 kg) | Fr | Sir John A. Macdonald HS | Toronto, ON |
| 19 | INF | Cannon Vandever | R/R | 6 ft 2 in (1.88 m) | 190 lb (86 kg) | Fr | Avon HS | Avon, IN |
| 20 | RHP | Drew Fieger | R/R | 6 ft 1 in (1.85 m) | 190 lb (86 kg) | Sr | Lincoln Trail CC | Fort Mitchell, KY |
| 21 | OF | Harrison Taubert | R/R | 6 ft 0 in (1.83 m) | 195 lb (88 kg) | Sr | Northeast CC | Casper, WY |
| 24 | LHP | Kevin Reed | L/L | 5 ft 9 in (1.75 m) | 180 lb (82 kg) | So | Martinsville HS | Martinsville, IN |
| 25 | C | Evan Waggoner | L/R | 6 ft 2 in (1.88 m) | 200 lb (91 kg) | Sr | Bedford North Lawrence HS | Bedford, IN |
| 26 | RHP | Luc Lawler | R/R | 5 ft 10 in (1.78 m) | 190 lb (86 kg) | Fr | Benet Academy | Naperville, IL |
| 27 | INF | Cole Iantomasi | R/R | 6 ft 0 in (1.83 m) | 195 lb (88 kg) | Jr | Jefferson College | Whitby, ON |
| 29 | RHP | Kellen Roberts | R/R | 5 ft 10 in (1.78 m) | 195 lb (88 kg) | So | Monroe HS | Monroe, MI |
| 31 | LHP | Jacob Jarvis | L/L | 6 ft 2 in (1.88 m) | 205 lb (93 kg) | Sr | Jefferson CC | Farmington, MO |
| 32 | C | Matt Flaherty | R/R | 6 ft 0 in (1.83 m) | 220 lb (100 kg) | Gr | Bellarmine | Lake Zurich, IL |
| 34 | RHP | Andrew Dusablon | R/R | 6 ft 1 in (1.85 m) | 165 lb (75 kg) | RS Jr | Cypress CC | Palmdale, CA |
| 35 | RHP | Owen Byberg | R/R | 6 ft 0 in (1.83 m) | 200 lb (91 kg) | Jr | Frontier CC | Barrie, ON |
| 36 | RHP | Elias Hachem | R/R | 6 ft 4 in (1.93 m) | 230 lb (104 kg) | Jr | Mount Carmel HS | Oak Park, IL |
| 37 | LHP | Sam Sandy | L/L | 6 ft 2 in (1.88 m) | 210 lb (95 kg) | Jr | Frontier CC | Athens, AL |
| 39 | RHP | Conner Vander-Luitgaren | R/R | 6 ft 2 in (1.88 m) | 190 lb (86 kg) | Fr | Center Grove HS | Bargersville, IN |
| 40 | RHP | Parker MacCauley | L/R | 6 ft 3 in (1.91 m) | 220 lb (100 kg) | RS Jr | Tennessee Tech | Paducah, KY |
| 41 | C | Chance Bentley | R/R | 5 ft 10 in (1.78 m) | 205 lb (93 kg) | So | Connersville HS | Connersville, IN |
| 44 | INF | Kevin McCormick | L/R | 6 ft 1 in (1.85 m) | 185 lb (84 kg) | RS Jr | St. Laurence HS | Orland Park, IL |
| 45 | INF | Brodie Peart | R/R | 6 ft 3 in (1.91 m) | 185 lb (84 kg) | So | Peoples Christian Academy | Markham, ON |

Head coach

- Wes Carroll (Evansville)

Assistant coach(es)

- Matt Wollenzin (Austin Peay)
- Jarrett Blunt (Evansville)
- Griffin McCormick (Sacramento State)

Legend

- (C) Team captain
- (S) Suspended
- (I) Ineligible
- Injured
- Current redshirt

Roster
Last update: February 14, 2025

=== Starters ===
Starting Lineup
| Pos. | No. | Player | Year |

Weekend Pitching Rotation
| Day | No. | Player | Year |

=== Coaching staff ===
2025 Evansville Purple Aces coaching staff
| Name | Position | Season at Evansville |
|---|---|---|
| Wes Carroll | Head coach | 17th |
| Matt Wollenzin | Hitting coach/recruiting coordinator | 3rd |
| Jarrett Blunt | Pitching coach | 2nd |
| Griffin McCormick | Assistant coach | 2nd |
| Brendan Hord | Graduate assistant | 1st |
| Eric Harcourt | Athletic trainer | 5th |

== Schedule and results ==
2025 Evansville Purple Aces game log: 10–18
Regular season: 10–18
February: 2–6

| Date | Site city, state | Rank^{#} | Opponent^{#} | Score | Win | Loss | Save | Overall record | MVC record | Ref. |
|---|---|---|---|---|---|---|---|---|---|---|
| February 14 | Gary Hogan Field; Little Rock, AR | | at Little Rock* | 4–5 | Royal (1–0) | **Roberts** (0–1) | — | 0–1 | 0–0 | |
| February 14 | Gary Hogan Field; Little Rock, AR | | at Little Rock* | 1–5 | Bunting (1–0) | **Deverman** (0–1) | — | 0–2 | 0–0 | |
| February 16 | Gary Hogan Field; Little Rock, AR | | at Little Rock* | 1–11^{8} | Cline (1–0) | **Reed** (0–1) | — | 0–3 | 0–0 | |
| February 18 | Dugan Field; Nashville, TN | | at Lipscomb* | 10–11^{13} | O'Brien (1–0) | **Clevidence** (0–1) | — | 0–4 | 0–0 | |
| February 23 | Charles H. Braun Stadium; Evansville, IN | | vs. Southern Indiana* | 1–9 | Kimball (2–0) | **Deverman** (0–2) | Rubio (2) | 0–5 | 0–0 | |
| February 23 | USI Baseball Field; Evansville, IN | | at Southern Indiana* | 13–0^{7} | **Reed** (1–1) | Gonzalez (0–1) | — | 1–5 | 0–0 | |
| February 25 | Kentucky Proud Park; Lexington, KY | | at Kentucky* | 3–24 | Harris (1–0) | **James** (0–1) | — | 1–6 | 0–0 | |
| February 28 | Taylor Stadium; Columbia, MO | | at Missouri* | 7–6 | **Deverman** (1–1) | Vaughn (1–1) | **Roberts** (1) | 2–6 | 0–0 | |

March: 7–12

| Date | Site city, state | Rank^{#} | Opponent^{#} | Score | Win | Loss | Save | Overall record | MVC record | Ref. |
|---|---|---|---|---|---|---|---|---|---|---|
| March 1 | Taylor Stadium; Columbia, MO | | at Missouri* | 2–6 | Libbert (1–1) | **Byberg** (0–1) | **Green** (1) | 2–7 | 0–0 | |
| March 1 | Taylor Stadium; Columbia, MO | | at Missouri* | 7–17^{7} | Drew (2–0) | **James** (0–2) | — | 2–8 | 0–0 | |
| March 2 | Taylor Stadium; Columbia, MO | | at Missouri* | 9–5 | **Reed** (2–1) | Lucas (0–1) | **Roberts** (2) | 3–8 | 0–0 | |
| March 4 | Hawkins Field; Nashville, TN | | at No. 18 Vanderbilt* | Canceled | | | | | | |
| March 7 | Bear Stadium; Conway, AR | | at Central Arkansas* | 10–11^{10} | Alexander (2–1) | **Roberts** (0–2) | — | 3–9 | 0–0 | |
| March 8 | Bear Stadium; Conway, AR | | at Central Arkansas* | 6–5 | **Hachem** (1–0) | Macrae (0–3) | **Roberts** (3) | 4–9 | 0–0 | |
| March 9 | Bear Stadium; Conway, AR | | at Central Arkansas* | 8–0 | **Reed** (3–1) | Velasquez (0–1) | — | 5–9 | 0–0 | |
| March 11 | Capaha Field; Cape Girardeau, MO | | at Southeast Missouri State* | 6–17^{7} | White (1–0) | **James** (0–3) | — | 5–10 | 0–0 | |
| March 12 | Roy E. Lee Field at Simmons Baseball Complex; Edwardsville, IL | | at SIU Edwardsville* | 11–12 | Davis (1–1) | **Fieger** (0–1) | — | 5–11 | 0–0 | |
| March 14 | Joe Lee Griffin Stadium; Homewood, AL | | at Samford* | 4–10 | Riggins (2–1) | **Byberg** (0–2) | — | 5–12 | 0–0 | |
| March 14 | Joe Lee Griffin Stadium; Homewood, AL | | at Samford* | 2–6^{7} | Keshock (3–0) | **Wills** (0–1) | — | 5–13 | 0–0 | |
| March 16 | Joe Lee Griffin Stadium; Homewood, AL | | at Samford* | 1–13^{7} | Blasche (2–0) | **Reed** (3–2) | — | 5–14 | 0–0 | |
| March 18 | Bart Kaufman Field; Bloomington, IN | | at Indiana* | 4–7 | Holderfield (1–0) | **Fieger** (0–2) | Haas (1) | 5–15 | 0–0 | |
| March 21 | Reagan Field; Murray, KY | | at Murray State | 6–5 | **Hansmann** (1–0) | Lyke (2–1) | **Peart** (1) | 6–15 | 1–0 | |
| March 22 | Reagan Field; Murray, KY | | at Murray State | 15–10 | **Fieger** (1–2) | Wajda (2–3) | — | 7–15 | 2–0 | |
| March 22 | Reagan Field; Murray, KY | | at Murray State | 5–9 | Zentko (2–1) | **Byberg** (0–3) | — | 7–16 | 2–1 | |
| March 25 | Charles H. Braun Stadium; Evansville, IN | | vs. Western Kentucky* | 3–13 | Penn (2–0) | **Fieger** (1–3) | — | 7–17 | 2–1 | |
| March 28 | Charles H. Braun Stadium; Evansville, IN | | vs. Valparaiso | 7–3 | **Deverman** (2–2) | Lockwood (2–4) | **Hansmann** (1) | 8–17 | 3–1 | |
| March 29 | Charles H. Braun Stadium; Evansville, IN | | vs. Valparaiso | 6–11 | Deliyannis (3–2) | **Reed** (3–3) | — | 8–18 | 3–2 | |
| March 30 | Charles H. Braun Stadium; Evansville, IN | | vs. Valparaiso | 5–4 | **MacCauley** (1–0) | Guazzo (0–1) | — | 9–18 | 4–2 | |

April: 1–0

| Date | Site city, state | Rank^{#} | Opponent^{#} | Score | Win | Loss | Save | Overall record | MVC record | Ref. |
|---|---|---|---|---|---|---|---|---|---|---|
| April 1 | Charles H. Braun Stadium; Evansville, IN | | vs. Southeast Missouri State* | 7–6 | **Willis** (1–1) | Kranawetter (1–1) | — | 10–18 | 4–2 | |
| April 4 | Les Miller Field at Curtis Granderson Stadium; Chicago, IL | | at UIC | | | | | – | – | |
| April 5 | Les Miller Field at Curtis Granderson Stadium; Chicago, IL | | at UIC | | | | | – | – | |
| April 6 | Les Miller Field at Curtis Granderson Stadium; Chicago, IL | | at UIC | | | | | – | – | |
| April 8 | Charles H. Braun Stadium; Evansville, IN | | vs. Butler* | | | | | – | – | |
| April 11 | Duffy Bass Field; Normal, IL | | at Illinois State | | | | | – | – | |
| April 12 | Duffy Bass Field; Normal, IL | | at Illinois State | | | | | – | – | |
| April 13 | Duffy Bass Field; Normal, IL | | at Illinois State | | | | | – | – | |
| April 17 | Charles H. Braun Stadium; Evansville, IN | | vs. Indiana State | | | | | – | – | |
| April 18 | Charles H. Braun Stadium; Evansville, IN | | vs. Indiana State | | | | | – | – | |
| April 19 | Charles H. Braun Stadium; Evansville, IN | | vs. Indiana State | | | | | – | – | |
| April 22 | Nick Denes Field; Bowling Green, KY | | at Western Kentucky* | | | | | – | – | |
| April 25 | Hammons Field; Springfield, MO | | at Missouri State | | | | | – | – | |
| April 26 | Hammons Field; Springfield, MO | | at Missouri State | | | | | – | – | |
| April 27 | Hammons Field; Springfield, MO | | at Missouri State | | | | | – | – | |
| April 29 | Charles H. Braun Stadium; Evansville, IN | | vs. Indiana | | | | | – | – | |

May: 0–0

| Date | Site city, state | Rank^{#} | Opponent^{#} | Score | Win | Loss | Save | Overall record | MVC record | Ref. |
|---|---|---|---|---|---|---|---|---|---|---|
| May 2 | Charles H. Braun Stadium; Evansville, IN | | vs. Belmont | | | | | – | – | |
| May 3 | Charles H. Braun Stadium; Evansville, IN | | vs. Belmont | | | | | – | – | |
| May 4 | Charles H. Braun Stadium; Evansville, IN | | vs. Belmont | | | | | – | – | |
| May 6 | USI Baseball Field; Evansville, IN | | at Southern Indiana* | | | | | – | – | |
| May 9 | Itchy Jones Stadium; Carbondale, IL | | at Southern Illinois | | | | | – | – | |
| May 10 | Itchy Jones Stadium; Carbondale, IL | | at Southern Illinois | | | | | – | – | |
| May 11 | Itchy Jones Stadium; Carbondale, IL | | at Southern Illinois | | | | | – | – | |
| May 15 | Charles H. Braun Stadium; Evansville, IN | | vs. Bradley | | | | | – | – | |
| May 16 | Charles H. Braun Stadium; Evansville, IN | | vs. Bradley | | | | | – | – | |
| May 17 | Charles H. Braun Stadium; Evansville, IN | | vs. Bradley | | | | | – | – | |

Legend: = Win = Loss = Canceled/postponed **Bold** = Evansville team member * Non-conference game

== Statistics ==
=== Record vs. conference opponents ===
Last two do not qualify for the conference tournament. Blank are not scheduled. Blue are home games, otherwise away.

2025 MVC baseball game results Source: 2025 MVC baseball game results
| Team | W–L | BEL | BRA | UE | ILSU | INSU | MSU | MUR | SIU | UIC | VAL | Team | Conf | SR | SW |
|---|---|---|---|---|---|---|---|---|---|---|---|---|---|---|---|
| BEL | 2–4 | | 0–0 | 0–0 | 1–2 | 0–0 | 1–2 | 0–0 | 0–0 | 0–0 | 0–0 | BEL | | 0–2 | 0–0 |
| BRA | 0–6 | 0–0 | | 0–0 | 0–0 | 0–0 | 0–3 | 0–0 | 0–3 | 0–0 | 0–0 | BRA | | 0–2 | 0–2 |
| UE | 4–2 | 0–0 | 0–0 | | 0–0 | 0–0 | 0–0 | 2–1 | 0–0 | 0–0 | 2–1 | UE | | 2–0 | 0–0 |
| ILSU | 4–2 | 2–1 | 0–0 | 0–0 | | 0–0 | 0–0 | 2–1 | 0–0 | 0–0 | 0–0 | ILSU | | 2–0 | 0–0 |
| INSU | 4–2 | 0–0 | 0–0 | 0–0 | 0–0 | | 0–0 | 0–0 | 0–0 | 2–1 | 2–1 | INSU | | 2–0 | 0–0 |
| MSU | 5–1 | 2–1 | 3–0 | 0–0 | 0–0 | 0–0 | | 0–0 | 0–0 | 0–0 | 0–0 | MSU | | 2–0 | 1–0 |
| MUR | 2–4 | 0–0 | 0–0 | 1–2 | 1–2 | 0–0 | 0–0 | | 0–0 | 0–0 | 0–0 | MUR | | 0–2 | 0–0 |
| SIU | 5–1 | 0–0 | 3–0 | 0–0 | 0–0 | 0–0 | 0–0 | 0–0 | | 2–1 | 0–0 | SIU | | 2–0 | 1–0 |
| UIC | 2–4 | 0–0 | 0–0 | 0–0 | 1–2 | 0–0 | 0–0 | 0–0 | 1–2 | | 0–0 | UIC | | 0–2 | 0–0 |
| VAL | 2–4 | 0–0 | 0–0 | 1–2 | 0–0 | 1–2 | 0–0 | 0–0 | 0–0 | 0–0 | | VAL | | 0–2 | 0–0 |
| Team | W–L | BEL | BRA | UE | ILSU | INSU | MSU | MUR | SIU | UIC | VAL | Team | Conf | SR | SW |

Updated for entire regular season.

=== Batting ===
| Player | G | AB | R | H | 2B | 3B | HR | RBI | SB | CS | BB | SO | AVG | OBP | SLG | OPS |
| Team totals | 0 | 0 | 0 | 0 | 0 | 0 | 0 | 0 | 0 | 0 | 0 | 0 | .0 | .0 | .0 | .0 |

=== Pitching ===
| Player | G | GS | IP | W | L | SV | ERA | H | 2B | 3B | HR | R | ER | BB | HBP | SO |
| Team totals | 0 | 0 | 0.0 | 0 | 0 | 0 | 0.0 | 0 | 0 | 0 | 0 | 0 | 0 | 0 | 0 | 0 |

== Rankings ==
Ranking movements
| | Week | | | | | | | | | | | | | | | | |
| Poll | Pre | 1 | 2 | 3 | 4 | 5 | 6 | 7 | 8 | 9 | 10 | 11 | 12 | 13 | 14 | 15 | Final |
|---|---|---|---|---|---|---|---|---|---|---|---|---|---|---|---|---|---|
| Coaches' | | * | | | | | | | | | | | | | | | |
| Baseball America | | | | | | | | | | | | | | | | | |
| NCBWA† | | | | | | | | | | | | | | | | | |

† NCBWA ranks 30 teams in their preseason poll, but only ranks 25 teams weekly during the season.
* A new poll was not released for this week, so for comparison purposes, the previous week's ranking is inserted in this week's slot.
