= 2025 Florida Atlantic Owls baseball team =

Season of Florida Atlantic University baseball team

2025 Florida Atlantic Owls baseball
- Conference: American Athletic Conference
- Record: 37–21 (15–12 AAC)
- Head coach: John McCormack (17th season)
- Assistant coaches: Jordan Tabakman; Michael Cleary; Hunter Cooley
- Home stadium: FAU Baseball Stadium

2025 American Athletic Conference baseball standings
	Conf.				Overall
Team	W		L	PCT	W		L	PCT
UTSA ‍†‍‍^{y}	23	–	4	.852	47	–	13	.783
Charlotte ‍‍‍	18	–	9	.667	36	–	22	.621
South Florida ‍‍‍	16	–	11	.593	31	–	25	.554
Florida Atlantic ‍‍‍	15	–	12	.556	37	–	21	.638
Tulane ‍‍‍	13	–	14	.481	33	–	25	.569
East Carolina ‍‍‡‍^{y}	13	–	14	.481	35	–	27	.565
Wichita State ‍‍‍	11	–	16	.407	20	–	36	.357
Rice ‍‍‍	10	–	17	.370	17	–	40	.298
UAB ‍‍‍	8	–	19	.296	24	–	30	.444
Memphis ‍‍‍	8	–	19	.296	22	–	33	.400
† – Conference champion ‡ – Tournament champion y – Invited to the NCAA tournament As of May 31, 2025; Rankings from D1Baseball

The 2025 Florida Atlantic Owls baseball team represented Florida Atlantic University in the sport of baseball during the 2025 college baseball season. The Owls competed as members of the American Athletic Conference (AAC). Home games were played at FAU Baseball Stadium on the university's main campus in Boca Raton, Florida. The team was coached by John McCormack, who was in his 17th season as Florida Atlantic's head coach.

== Preseason ==
=== AAC media poll ===
The American Athletic Conference preseason poll was released on December 18, 2024, with the Owls predicted to finish in sixth place.

Coaches Poll
Rank	School (1st Place Votes)	Total
1	East Carolina (8)	80
2	Wichita State (2)	72
3	Tulane	63
4	UTSA	55
5	Charlotte	50
6	Florida Atlantic	36
7	South Florida	31
8	UAB	27
9	Memphis	21
10	Rice	15

== Schedule ==
Legend
	Florida Atlantic win
	Florida Atlantic loss
	Postponement
**Bold**	Florida Atlantic team member

2025 Florida Atlantic Owls baseball game log (37–21)
Regular season (36–19)

February (8–1)
Date	Opponent	Stadium Site	Score	Win	Loss	Save	Attendance	Overall Record
February 14	Delaware	FAU Baseball Stadium; Boca Raton, FL	**W** 9–4	**T. Beard** (1–0)	R. McLaughlin (0–1)	None	649	1–0
February 15	Delaware	FAU Baseball Stadium	**W** 19–1	**T. Murphy** (1–0)	E. Shaub (0–1)	None	568	2–0
February 16	Delaware	FAU Baseball Stadium	**W** 7–0	**J. Litman** (1–0)	D. Velazquez (0–1)	None	621	3–0
February 18	Miami	FAU Baseball Stadium	**W** 2–1	**M. Martzolf** (1–0)	M. Fernandez (0–1)	**B. Ostrander** (1)	1,172	4–0
February 21	UConn	FAU Baseball Stadium	**W** 5–4	**S. Andrews** (1–0)	C. Suchy (0–2)	**MJ Bollinger** (1)	477	5–0
February 22	UConn	FAU Baseball Stadium	**W** 25–17	**M. Martzolf** (2–0)	I. Cooke (0–2)	None	601	6–0
February 23	UConn	FAU Baseball Stadium	**L** 3–5^{10}	B. Afthim (1–0)	**MJ Bollinger** (0–1)	None	531	6–1
February 25	UCF	John Euliano Park; Orlando, FL	**W** 4–3	**M. Martzolf** (3–0)	C. Stanford (0–1)	**MJ Bollinger** (2)	1,946	7–1
February 28	Fordham	FAU Baseball Stadium	**W** 5–2	**T. Beard** (2–0)	A. Dowd (0–2)	**MJ Bollinger** (3)	302	8–1

March (11–8)
Date	Opponent	Stadium Site	Score	Win	Loss	Save	Attendance	Overall Record	AAC Record
March 1	Fordham	FAU Baseball Stadium	**W** 11–1	**M. Martzolf** (4–0)	M. Rabayda (0–3)	None	325	9–1	–
March 2	Fordham	FAU Baseball Stadium	**W** 6–5	**MJ Bollinger** (1–1)	G. Brady (0–1)	None	381	10–1	–
March 5	at No. 7 Florida	Condron Ballpark; Gainesville, FL	**L** 2–4	B. Barlow (1–0)	**Z. Kilby** (0–1)	A. Philpott (2)	4,408	10–2	–
March 7	at FIU	FIU Baseball Stadium; Westchester, FL	**L** 3–7	J. Villarreal (3–0)	**M. Martzolf** (4–1)	None	619	10–3	–
March 8	FIU	FAU Baseball Stadium	**W** 6–5	**K. Adetuyi** (1–0)	J. Bishop (0–1)	**MJ Bollinger** (4)	642	11–3	–
March 9	at FIU	FIU Baseball Stadium	**W** 6–4	**J. Litman** (2–0)	L. Runde (2–1)	**MJ Bollinger** (5)	614	12–3	–
March 11	Bucknell	FAU Baseball Stadium	**W** 15–8	**B. Ostrander** (1–0)	B. Mitchell (0–1)	None	516	13–3	–
March 12	Bucknell	FAU Baseball Stadium	**W** 15–5^{8}	**B. Boully** (1–0)	AJ Murray (0–1)	None	378	14–3	–
March 14	Bradley	FAU Baseball Stadium	**W** 6–0	**T. Beard** (3–0)	T. Lutz (1–3)	None	512	15–3	–
March 15	Bradley	FAU Baseball Stadium	**W** 14–4	**T. Murphy** (2–0)	M. Kitzman (0–1)	None	497	16–3	–
March 16	Bradley	FAU Baseball Stadium	**W** 15–7	**S. Andrews** (2–0)	D. Politte (1–3)	None	471	17–3	–
March 18	Miami	FAU Baseball Stadium	**L** 5–6	AJ Ciscar (1–0)	**C. Holjes** (0–1)	W. Smith (2)	970	17–4	–
March 21	Rice	FAU Baseball Stadium	**W** 9–3	**T. Beard** (4–0)	D. Hickson (0–3)	**B. Ostrander** (2)	642	18–4	1–0
March 22	Rice	FAU Baseball Stadium	**L** 1–3	J.D. McCracken (1–1)	**T. Murphy** (2–1)	G. Stratton (1)	558	18–5	1–1
March 23	Rice	FAU Baseball Stadium	**W** 6–4	**MJ Bollinger** (2–1)	R. Gallant (1–2)	None	622	19–5	2–1
March 25	at Florida Gulf Coast	Swanson Stadium; Fort Myers, FL	**L** 2–3	A. Ursitti (1–2)	**M. Martzolf** (4–2)	None	520	19–6	–
March 28	at UTSA	Roadrunner Field; San Antonio, TX	**L** 7–10	Z. Royse (2–3)	**S. Andrews** (2–1)	R. Orloski (1)	594	19–7	2–2
March 29	at UTSA	Roadrunner Field	**L** 3–7	C. Kelley (1–0)	**T. Murphy** (2–2)	None	725	19–8	2–3
March 30	at UTSA	Roadrunner Field	**L** 6–7	G. Brown (2–0)	**MJ Bollinger** (2–2)	None	636	19–9	2–4

April (10–6)
Date	Opponent	Stadium Site	Score	Win	Loss	Save	Attendance	Overall Record	AAC Record
April 1	at Florida Gulf Coast	Hammond Stadium; Fort Myers, FL	**W** 8–3	**Z. Kilby** (1–1)	E. Mattison (1–1)	None	922	20–9	–
April 4	at East Carolina	Clark–LeClair Stadium; Greenville, NC	**W** 6–5	**T. Beard** (5–0)	E. Norby (4–3)	**MJ Bollinger** (6)	4,372	21–9	3–4
April 5	at East Carolina	Clark–LeClair Stadium	**W** 14–1	**T. Murphy** (3–2)	N. Moran (1–1)	None	5,891	22–9	4–4
April 6	at East Carolina	Clark–LeClair Stadium	**W** 8–6	**C. Holjes** (1–1)	S. Jenkins (3–2)	**MJ Bollinger** (7)	4,233	23–9	5–4
April 11	Memphis	FAU Baseball Stadium	**W** 2–1	**T. Beard** (6–0)	S. Garner (2–4)	**MJ Bollinger** (8)	458	24–9	6–4
April 12	Memphis	FAU Baseball Stadium	**L** 7–8	D. Oswalt (3–0)	**S. Andrews** (2–2)	None	451	24–10	6–5
April 13	Memphis	FAU Baseball Stadium	**L** 4–5	I. Lucas (3–0)	**J. Litman** (2–1)	B. Sanders (3)	438	24–11	6–6
April 15	at Miami	Alex Rodriguez Park; Miami, FL	**L** 4–5	A. Giroux (5–1)	**Z. Kilby** (1–2)	B. Walters (3)	2,122	24–12	–
April 17	Wichita State	FAU Baseball Stadium	**W** 9–2	**T. Beard** (7–0)	G. Adler (3–4)	None	457	25–12	7–6
April 18	Wichita State	FAU Baseball Stadium	**W** 8–4	**Z. Kilby** (2–2)	J. Arnett (0–2)	None	460	26–12	8–6
April 19	Wichita State	FAU Baseball Stadium	**W** 7–4	**J. Litman** (3–1)	B. Hamilton (1–5)	None	407	27–12	9–6
April 22	UCF	FAU Baseball Stadium	**L** 2–17^{7}	G. Siegel (4–2)	**D. Oborne** (0–1)	None	1,519	27–13	–
April 25	at Charlotte	Robert & Mariam Hayes Stadium; Charlotte, NC	**L** 0–3	B. Gillespie (6–3)	**C. Holjes** (1–2)	None	545	27–14	9–7
April 26	at Charlotte	Robert & Mariam Hayes Stadium	**W** 8–5	**T. Murphy** (4–2)	A. Kribbs (3–2)	**MJ Bollinger** (9)	812	28–14	10–7
April 27	at Charlotte	Robert & Mariam Hayes Stadium	**L** 2–4	M. Szturma (3–0)	**J. Litman** (3–2)	J. Taylor (7)	602	28–15	10–8
April 29	FIU	FAU Baseball Stadium	**W** 5–2	**N. Wimberly** (1–0)	R. Reyerson (0–1)	None	445	29–15	–

May (7–4)
Date	Opponent	Stadium Site	Score	Win	Loss	Save	Attendance	Overall Record	AAC Record
May 2	at Tulane	Greer Field at Turchin Stadium; New Orleans, LA	**W** 16–12	**C. Holjes** (2–2)	L. Fladda (3–5)	None	1,813	30–15	11–8
May 3	at Tulane	Greer Field at Turchin Stadium	**W** 10–8	**B. Ostrander** (2–0)	T. Montiel (4–2)	**T. Beard** (1)	1,511	31–15	12–8
May 4	at Tulane	Greer Field at Turchin Stadium	**L** 4–6	B. Wilcenski (5–3)	**J. Litman** (3–3)	J. Moore (1)	1,401	31–16	12–9
May 6	Florida Gulf Coast	FAU Baseball Stadium	**W** 2–0	**J. Abbazia** (1–0)	D. Cheeley (2–2)	**S. Andrews** (1)	437	32–16	–
May 9	South Florida	FAU Baseball Stadium	**L** 3–4	C. Braun (5–3)	**MJ Bollinger** (2–3)	A. Newton (1)	565	32–17	12–10
May 10	South Florida	FAU Baseball Stadium	**L** 4–9	A. Longoria (3–0)	**C. Holjes** (2–3)	None	892	32–18	12–11
May 11	South Florida	FAU Baseball Stadium	**W** 6–2	**B. Ostrander** (3–0)	L. Yorek (3–3)	None	431	33–18	13–11
May 13	Florida Gulf Coast	FAU Baseball Stadium	**W** 9–8	**M. Loubier** (1–0)	J. Vera (2–7)	None	361	34–18	–
May 15	at UAB	Jerry D. Young Memorial Field; Birmingham, AL	**W** 12–9	**B. Ostrander** (4–0)	B. Conner (1–2)	**MJ Bollinger** (10)	307	35–18	14–11
May 16	at UAB	Jerry D. Young Memorial Field	**L** 3–11	C. Daniel (6–5)	**T. Murphy** (4–3)	None	315	35–19	14–12
May 17	at UAB	Jerry D. Young Memorial Field	**W** 4–3	**C. Holjes** (3–3)	J. Hicks (1–2)	**MJ Bollinger** (11)	326	36–19	15–12

Post-Season (1–2)

AAC Tournament (1–2)
Date	Opponent	Seed	Site/stadium	Score	Win	Loss	Save	TV	Overall record	Tournament Record
May 20	vs. (5) Tulane	4	BayCare Ballpark; Clearwater, FL	**L** 3–6	M. Lombardi (4–0)	**T. Beard** (7–1)	None	ESPN+	36–20	0–1
May 21	vs. (8) Rice	4	BayCare Ballpark	**W** 8–6	**MJ Bollinger** (3–3)	J. Ben-Shoshan (3–4)	None	ESPN+	37–20	1–1
May 23	vs. (1) UTSA	4	BayCare Ballpark	**L** 3–6	K. Dove (2–0)	**C. Holjes** (3–4)	R. Orloski (1)	ESPN+	37–21	1–2

Schedule source:

*Rankings are based on the team's current ranking in the D1Baseball poll.
