= 2025 Missouri Valley Conference baseball tournament =

- Teams: 8
- Format: Single-elimination/Double-elimination
- Finals site: Duffy Bass Field; Normal, Illinois
- Champions: Murray State (1st title)
- Winning coach: Dan Skirka (1st title)
- MVP: Dustin Mercer (Murray State)
- Television: ESPN+

2025 Missouri Valley Conference baseball standings
	Conf.				Overall
Team	W		L	PCT	W		L	PCT
Murray State ‍†‍‡‍^{y}	17	–	8	.680	42	–	14	.750
Missouri State ‍†‍‍	17	–	8	.680	30	–	25	.545
Southern Illinois ‍‍‍	16	–	11	.593	37	–	20	.649
UIC ‍‍‍	16	–	11	.593	22	–	33	.400
Illinois State ‍‍‍	15	–	12	.556	28	–	28	.500
Belmont ‍‍‍	13	–	14	.481	26	–	34	.433
Indiana State ‍‍‍	12	–	15	.444	24	–	31	.436
Bradley ‍‍‍	12	–	15	.444	16	–	35	.314
Evansville ‍‍‍	10	–	17	.370	17	–	37	.315
Valparaiso ‍‍‍	5	–	22	.185	10	–	40	.200
† – Conference champion ‡ – Tournament champion y – Invited to the NCAA Tournament; As of June 2, 2025; Rankings from D1Baseball

The 2025 Missouri Valley Conference baseball tournament was held from May 20 through 24 at Duffy Bass Field in Normal, Illinois. The top eight regular season finishers of the conference's 10 teams met in the tournament, with the top 4 teams advancing directly to the double-elimination rounds. Murray State earned the conference's automatic bid to the 2025 NCAA Division I baseball tournament.

== Seeding and format ==
The league's top eight teams were seeded based on conference winning percentage. The four lowest seeds participated in a play-in round with the winners advancing to a six-team double-elimination bracket.

== Results ==
Play-in Round

Tuesday, May 20, 2025 7:30 PM CT at Duffy Bass Field
Team	1	2	3	4	5	6	7	8	R	H	E
No. 8 Indiana State	2	0	0	1	0	0	0	1	4	8	3
No. 5 Illinois State	4	0	1	0	0	0	3	6	14	15	1
WP: Tyrelle Chadwick (6-3) LP: Ty Brooks (3-5); Boxscore

Wednesday, May 21, 2025 9:00 AM CT at Duffy Bass Field
Team	1	2	3	4	5	6	7	8	9	R	H	E
No. 7 Bradley	1	3	0	0	0	3	0	0	0	7	7	3
No. 6 Belmont	2	0	3	2	1	2	0	1	X	11	16	1
WP: Joe Ruzicka (6-4) LP: Gavin Thompson (3-6) Sv: Andrew Perry (1); Boxscore

Double-Elim Tournament

First round
1	Murray State	15
6	Belmont	14^{11}
2	Missouri State	7
5	Illinois State	2
3	Southern Illinois	17
4	UIC	19

Second round
1	Murray State	10
3	Southern Illinois	5
2	Missouri State	5
4	UIC	11
6	Belmont	7
5	Illinois State	3

Third round
1	Murray State	5
4	UIC	2
6	Belmont	10
2	Missouri State	20

Semifinals
4	UIC	1
2	Missouri State	4

Final
1	Murray State	10	–
2	Missouri State	5	–

== Schedule ==
Game	Time*	Matchup^{#}	Score	Notes	Reference
Tuesday, May 20
1	7:30 pm	No. 8 Indiana State vs No. 5 Illinois State	4−14 (F/8)		
Wednesday, May 21
2	9:00 am	No. 7 Bradley vs No. 6 Belmont	7−11		
3	12:30 pm	No. 4 UIC vs No. 3 Southern Illinois	19−17		
4	4:00 pm	No. 6 Belmont vs No. 1 Murray State	14−15 (F/11)		
Thursday, May 22
5	11:00 am	No. 5 Illinois State vs No. 2 Missouri State	2−7		
6	3:00 pm	No. 6 Belmont vs No. 5 Illinois State	7−3	Illinois State Eliminated	
7	7:00 pm	No. 3 Southern Illinois vs No. 1 Murray State	5−10	Southern Illinois Eliminated	
Friday, May 23
8	11:00 am	No. 4 UIC vs No. 2 Missouri State	11−5		
9	3:00 pm	No. 6 Belmont vs No. 2 Missouri State	10−20	Belmont Eliminated	
10	7:00 pm	No. 4 UIC vs No. 1 Murray State	2−5		
Saturday, May 24
11	11:00 am	No. 4 UIC vs No. 2 Missouri State	1−4	UIC Eliminated	
12	3:00 pm	No. 2 Missouri State vs No. 1 Murray State	5−10	Murray State wins Missouri Valley championship	

== All–Tournament Team ==
Player	Team
Noah Smith	Illinois State
Mike Sprockett	Belmont
Landon Godsey	Belmont
Lucas Smith	UIC
Luke Nowak	UIC
Caden Bogenpohl	Missouri State
Jason Schaaf	Missouri State
Curry Sutherland	Missouri State
Dan Tauken	Murray State
Jonathan Hogart	Murray State
Jacob Hustedde	Murray State
**Dustin Mercer**	Murray State

MVP in bold
