= 2025 UTSA Roadrunners baseball team =

2025 season of the UTSA Roadrunners baseball team

2025 UTSA Roadrunners baseball

American Athletic Conference regular season champions Austin Regional champions

Los Angeles Super Regional, 0–2
- Conference: American Athletic Conference
- Record: 47–15 (23–4 AAC)
- Head coach: Pat Hallmark (6th season)
- Assistant coaches: Michael Cavazos (1st season); Zach Butler (5th season); Ryan Aguayo (6th season)
- Home stadium: Roadrunner Field

2025 American Athletic Conference baseball standings
	Conf.				Overall
Team	W		L	PCT	W		L	PCT
UTSA ‍†‍‍^{y}	23	–	4	.852	47	–	13	.783
Charlotte ‍‍‍	18	–	9	.667	36	–	22	.621
South Florida ‍‍‍	16	–	11	.593	31	–	25	.554
Florida Atlantic ‍‍‍	15	–	12	.556	37	–	21	.638
Tulane ‍‍‍	13	–	14	.481	33	–	25	.569
East Carolina ‍‍‡‍^{y}	13	–	14	.481	35	–	27	.565
Wichita State ‍‍‍	11	–	16	.407	20	–	36	.357
Rice ‍‍‍	10	–	17	.370	17	–	40	.298
UAB ‍‍‍	8	–	19	.296	24	–	30	.444
Memphis ‍‍‍	8	–	19	.296	22	–	33	.400
† – Conference champion ‡ – Tournament champion y – Invited to the NCAA tournament As of May 31, 2025; Rankings from D1Baseball

The 2025 UTSA Roadrunners baseball team represents the University of Texas at San Antonio in the sport of baseball for the 2025 college baseball season. The Roadrunners compete in Division I of the National Collegiate Athletic Association (NCAA) and in the American Athletic Conference. They play their home games at Roadrunner Field in San Antonio, Texas. The team is coached by Patrick Hallmark, who is in his 6th season with the Roadrunners.

== Preseason ==
=== AAC media poll ===
Media poll
Predicted finish	Team	1st Place Votes
1		
2		
3		
4		
5		
6		
7		
8		
9		
10		-

=== Preseason All-AAC team ===
Preseason All-CUSA Team
Player	No.	Position	Class

== Personnel ==
2025 UTSA Roadrunners baseball team
Players	Coaches
# / Pos. / Name / B/T / Height / Weight / Year / Home town	Head coach Patrick Hallmark (Rice) Assistant coach(es) Ryan Aguayo (New Mexico State); Zach Butler (McNeese State) Legend: (C) Team captain; (S) Suspended; (I) Ineligible; Injured; Current redshirt; Roster; Last update: May 12, 2025

== Schedule and results ==
2025 UTSA Roadrunners baseball game log (Overall: 47-15; Conference: 23-4); (Home: 25-2; Away: 19-11; Neutral: 3–2)
Regular season (0-0)
February (0-0)
(Home; 0-0; Away: 0-0)

Date	Time	Opponent	Rank	TV	Venue	Score	Win	Loss	Save	Attendance	Overall record	AAC record

March (0-0)
(Home; 0-0; Away: 0-0)

Date	Time	Opponent	Rank	TV	Venue	Score	Win	Loss	Save	Attendance	Overall record	AAC record

April (0-0)
(Home; 0-0; Away: 0-0)

Date	Time	Opponent	Rank	TV	Venue	Score	Win	Loss	Save	Attendance	Overall record	ACC record

May (0-0)
(Home; 0-0; Away: 0-0)

Date Time	Opponent	Rank	TV	Venue	Score	Win	Loss	Save	Attendance	Overall record	ACC record

Postseason (5-4)
AAC Tournament (2-2)

Date	Time	Opponent	Rank	TV	Venue	Score	Win	Loss	Save	Attendance	Overall record	Tournament record
May 20th	12:53 p.m.	vs (8) Rice (**First Round**)	(1)	ESPN+	BayCare Ballpark • Clearwater, Florida	**W 4-2**	**Rober Orloski (8-0)**	Davion Hickson (2-7)	—	—	44-11	1-0
May 22nd	1:00 p.m.	vs (5) Tulane (**Second Round**)	(1)	ESPN+	BayCare Ballpark • Clearwater, Florida	**L 6-10**	Montiel Tayler (5-2)	**Kelley Connor (3-1)**	—	—	44-12	1-1
May 23rd	1:00 p.m.	vs (4) Florida Atlantic (**Second Round Losser Bracket**)	(1)	ESPN+	BayCare Ballpark • Clearwater, Florida	**W 6-3**	**Dendall Dove (2-0)**	Holjes Carter (3-4)	**Robert Orloski (1)**	—	45-12	2-1
May 24th	9:00 a.m.	vs (5) Tulane (**Semifinals**)	(1)	ESPN+	BayCare Ballpark • Clearwater, Florida	**L 3-6**	Benbrook Carter (3-1)	**Gunnar Brown (3-2)**	Montiel Tayler (1)	—	45-13	2-2

Austin Regional (3-0)

Date	Time	Opponent	Rank	TV	Venue	Score	Win	Loss	Save	Attendance	Overall record	NCAAT record
May 30th	8:00 p.m.	(3) Kansas State	(2)	—	Disch-Falk Field • Austin, Texas	**W 10-2**	**Zach Royse (9-4)**	Jacob Frsot (1-5)	—	7,025	46-13	1-0
May 31st	10:00 p.m.	(1) No. 2 Texas	(2)	—	Disch-Falk Field • Austin, Texas	**W 9-7**	**Kendall DOve (3-0)**	Max Grubbs (6-2)	**Braylon Owens (3)**	7,953	47-13	2-0
June 1st	9:00 p.m.	(1) No. 2 Texas	(2)	—	Disch-Falk Field • Austin, Texas	**W 7-4**	**Gunnar Brown (4-2)**	Hudson Hamilton (0-1)	**Robert Orloski (9)**	7,407	48-13	3-0

Los Angeles Super Regional (0–2)

Date	Time	Opponent	Rank	TV	Venue	Score	Win	Loss	Save	Attendance	Overall record	NCAAT record
June 7th	6:00 p.m.	(15) No. 13 UCLA (Game 1)	—	ESPNU	Jackie Robinson Stadium • Los Angeles, California	**L** 2–5	Michael Barnett (12–1)	**Zach Royse** (9–5)	Easton Hawk (7)	1,392	48–14	3–1
June 8th	2:00 p.m.	(15) No. 13 UCLA (Game 2)	—	ESPN2	Jackie Robinson Stadium	**L** 0–7	Grothues (4–1)	**Myles** (5–2)	—	1,793	48–15	3–2

"#" represents ranking. All rankings from D1 Baseball Poll on the date of the contest.
"()" represents postseason seeding in the AAC Tournament or NCAA Regional, respectively.
= Win, = Loss, = Canceled/Postponed
Bold = **UTSA Roadrunners team member**
* = Non-Conference Game
Schedule Source:

== Rankings ==
Ranking movements
	Week																		
Poll	Pre	1	2	3	4	5	6	7	8	9	10	11	12	13	14	15	16	17	Final
Coaches'		*																	
Baseball America																			
NCBWA†																			

† NCBWA ranks 30 teams in their preseason poll, but only ranks 25 teams weekly during the season.
* A new poll was not released for this week, so for comparison purposes, the previous week's ranking is inserted in this week's slot.
