= 2025 American Athletic Conference baseball tournament =

American college baseball tournament

- Teams: 8
- Format: Double-elimination tournament
- Finals site: BayCare Ballpark; Clearwater, FL
- Champions: East Carolina (4th title)
- Winning coach: Cliff Godwin (4th title)
- MVP: Braden Burress (East Carolina)

2025 American Athletic Conference baseball standings
	Conf.				Overall
Team	W		L	PCT	W		L	PCT
UTSA ‍†‍‍^{y}	23	–	4	.852	47	–	13	.783
Charlotte ‍‍‍	18	–	9	.667	36	–	22	.621
South Florida ‍‍‍	16	–	11	.593	31	–	25	.554
Florida Atlantic ‍‍‍	15	–	12	.556	37	–	21	.638
Tulane ‍‍‍	13	–	14	.481	33	–	25	.569
East Carolina ‍‍‡‍^{y}	13	–	14	.481	35	–	27	.565
Wichita State ‍‍‍	11	–	16	.407	20	–	36	.357
Rice ‍‍‍	10	–	17	.370	17	–	40	.298
UAB ‍‍‍	8	–	19	.296	24	–	30	.444
Memphis ‍‍‍	8	–	19	.296	22	–	33	.400
† – Conference champion ‡ – Tournament champion y – Invited to the NCAA tournament As of May 31, 2025; Rankings from D1Baseball

The 2025 American Athletic Conference baseball tournament was held at BayCare Ballpark in Clearwater, Florida from May 20 through May 25. The event, held at the end of the conference regular season, determined the champion of the American Athletic Conference for the 2025 season. The East Carolina Pirates won the double-elimination tournament and received the conference's automatic bid to the 2025 NCAA Division I baseball tournament.

This was the last conference tournament under the American Athletic Conference name. In July 2025, the conference dropped the word "Athletic" from its name, renaming itself the American Conference.

== Format and seeding ==
The top eight baseball teams in The American were seeded based on their records in conference play. The tournament used a two bracket double-elimination format, leading to a single championship game between the winners of each bracket.

=== Bracket ===
First round
1	UTSA	4
8	Rice	2
4	Florida Atlantic	3
5	Tulane	6
4	Florida Atlantic	8
8	Rice	6
2	Charlotte	7
7	Wichita State	1
3	South Florida	4
6	East Carolina	9
3	South Florida	4
7	Wichita State	3

Second round
1	UTSA	6
5	Tulane	10
1	UTSA	6
4	Florida Atlantic	3
2	Charlotte	5
6	East Carolina	6
2	Charlotte	6
3	South Florida	7

Semifinals
5	Tulane	6	–
1	UTSA	3	–
6	East Carolina	9	–
3	South Florida	7	–

Finals
5	Tulane	2
6	East Carolina	8

== Schedule ==
Game	Time*	Matchup^{#}	Score	Television
Tuesday, May 20
1	9:00 a.m.	No. 4 Florida Atlantic vs No. 5 Tulane	3−6	ESPN+
2	12:53 p.m	No. 1 UTSA vs No. 8 Rice	4−2	ESPN+
3	4:00 p.m.	No. 2 Charlotte vs No. 7 Wichita State	7−1	ESPN+
4	7:57 p.m.	No. 3 South Florida vs No. 6 East Carolina	4−9	ESPN+
Wednesday, May 21
5	1:00 p.m.	No. 4 Florida Atlantic vs No. 8 Rice	8−6	ESPN+
6	4:55 p.m.	No. 7 Wichita State vs No. 3 South Florida	3−4	ESPN+
Thursday, May 22
7	1:00 p.m.	No. 5 Tulane vs No. 1 UTSA	10−6	ESPN+
8	5:10 p.m.	No. 2 Charlotte vs No. 6 East Carolina	5−6	ESPN+
Friday, May 23
9	1:00 p.m.	No. 4 Florida Atlantic vs No. 1 UTSA	3−6	ESPN+
10	4:35 p.m.	No. 3 South Florida vs No. 2 Charlotte	7−6	ESPN+
Semifinals – Saturday, May 24
11	9:00 a.m.	No. 5 Tulane vs No. 1 UTSA	6−3	ESPN+
12	12:50 p.m	No. 6 East Carolina vs No. 3 South Florida	9−7	ESPN+
Championship – Sunday, May 25				ESPN+
13	12:00 p.m.	No. 5 Tulane vs No. 6 East Carolina	2−8	ESPNEWS
*Game times in EDT. # – Rankings denote tournament seed.

== All–Tournament Team ==
Player	Team
Theo Bryant	Tulane
Tayler Montiel	Tulane
Gavin Schulz	Tulane
Walker Barron	East Carolina
**Braden Burress**	East Carolina
Jack Herring	East Carolina
Austin Irby	East Carolina
Sean Jenkins	East Carolina
Ryley Johnson	East Carolina
Colby Wallace	East Carolina
Dixon Williams	East Carolina

MVP in bold
