= Johnny Reagan =

American college baseball coach

Biographical details
- Born: May 31, 1926; Bismarck, Missouri
- Died: December 14, 2018 (aged 92); Murray, Kentucky

Coaching career (HC unless noted)
- 1958–1993: Murray State

Administrative career (AD unless noted)
- 1978–1987: Murray State

Head coaching record
- Overall: 776–508–11

Accomplishments and honors

Championships
- OVC: 1958, 1959 (co-champion), 1961, 1963 (co-champion), 1964, 1965, 1970, 1974, 1975, 1979, 1991 (regular season).

Awards
- OVC Coach of the Year: 1963, 1970, 1974, 1975, 1979, 1985, 1991

John Lee Reagan (May 31, 1926 – December 14, 2018) was an American college baseball coach. In 36 years (1958–1993) as head baseball coach at Murray State University, Reagan amassed a record of 776–508–11, including 11 Ohio Valley Conference championships. He is a member of the Ohio Valley Conference, Murray State, American Baseball Coaches Association, Missouri Athletic and Bismarck (Missouri) High School halls of fame. The baseball field at Murray State, along with the field at Bismarck High School, bears his name.

== Playing career ==
Born in Bismarck, Missouri, "Red" Reagan was a standout athlete at Bismarck High School. As a senior in 1943–44, he led his basketball team to a 35–3 record and state championship, and was named Missouri High School State Most Valuable Player. He enrolled at Murray State during World War II and quickly earned a place on the basketball and baseball teams. In his first year on the varsity (1944–45), Reagan led the basketball team in every statistical category. He also led Murray State in scoring in three of his four seasons and finished his career in 1948 with 973 points, a school record at the time. He is one of nine players to have his Murray State basketball jersey number retired, as his No. 20 hangs in the rafters of the school's CFSB Center.

He began a career in professional baseball after graduation and spent two years in the St. Louis Cardinals minor league system.

== Coaching career ==
Reagan began his coaching career as the baseball and basketball coach at Bismarck High School. He later began his college coaching career at Northeast Louisiana State College (now the University of Louisiana at Monroe), where he coached basketball for two seasons before returning to Murray State in 1957 to take over as head baseball coach.

His first team at Murray State posted a 14–5 record and won the OVC regular-season championship. His teams won or shared 10 more conference titles, the last in 1991. He also led Murray State to 27-straight winning seasons and its first two NCAA Division I Baseball Championship appearances, in 1975 and 1979. His 1975 team finished the season with a 40–9 record, was ranked No. 23 in Division I and led the nation in batting average (.332). His 1979 team (27–10–2), ranked 17th in Division I, came one win from advancing to the College World Series. His 1973 (19th) and 1974 (28th) teams also finished the season ranked in the NCAA poll.

During his tenure as baseball coach, he was a seven-time OVC Coach of the Year and developed several professional players, including major leaguers Pat Jarvis, Jack Perconte and Kirk Rueter.

While still baseball coach, Reagan served as director of athletics at Murray State from 1978 to 1987. During much of that time (1978–1986), he also served as chairman of the NCAA Baseball Committee.

Reagan retired from coaching after the 1993 season. The school retired his baseball uniform No. 36 shortly thereafter.
