= Capaha Field =

Baseball park in Cape Girardeau, Missouri, U.S.

- Interactive map of Capaha Field
- Location: NW End Boulevard and Normal Avenue, Cape Girardeau, MO, United States
- Coordinates: 37.313072°N 89.536394°W
- Capacity: 2,000
- Surface: Artificial Turf
- Scoreboard: Electronic
- Field size: 335 ft. (LF), 380 ft. (LCF), 400 ft. (CF), 380 ft. (RCF), 335 ft. (RF)
- Public transit: Cape Girardeau Transit Authority

Tenants
- Southeast Missouri State Redhawks baseball (NCAA); Cape Catfish (PL) 2019–present Cape Capahas (ALB)

Website
- semoredhawks.com//capaha-field

Capaha Field is a baseball venue in Cape Girardeau, Missouri, United States. It is home to the Southeast Missouri State Redhawks college baseball team of the NCAA Division I Ohio Valley Conference. The field is located two blocks away from the Southeast Missouri State campus. It has a capacity of 2,000 spectators and is also home to the Prospect League summer collegiate Cape Catfish, the amateur Cape Capahas baseball team and local youth American Legion baseball.

Capaha Field underwent a $1.8 million renovation that featured new synthetic turf. Other upgrades to the facility included a new scoreboard equipped with a video board, a new outfield fence, new bullpens, as well as other cosmetic upgrades including new paint and fencing all around the field. Capaha Field includes a press box which was completed prior to the start of the 2006 season. The press box, which is equipped with wireless broadband internet access, televisions, a kitchen/lounge area and restroom, gives staff and media a view behind home plate.

== See also ==
- List of NCAA Division I baseball venues
