= 2025 NCAA Division I baseball tournament =

American college sports championship

- Season: 2025
- Teams: 64
- Finals site: Charles Schwab Field Omaha; Omaha, Nebraska
- Champions: LSU (8th title)
- Runner-up: Coastal Carolina (2nd CWS Appearance)
- Winning coach: Jay Johnson (2nd title)
- MOP: Kade Anderson (LSU)
- Attendance: 342,676
- Television: ABC; ESPN; ESPN2; ESPNU; ACCN; SECN; ESPN+

The 2025 NCAA Division I baseball tournament was the 78th edition of the NCAA Division I Baseball Championship, with LSU defeating Coastal Carolina for their eighth National Title. The 64-team tournament began on Friday, May 30, as part of the 2025 NCAA Division I baseball season and ended with the 2025 Men's College World Series in Omaha, Nebraska, which began on June 13 and ended on June 22.

The 64 participating NCAA Division I college baseball teams were selected from an eligible 300 teams. Teams were divided into 16 regionals of four teams, each of which was conducted via a double-elimination bracket. Regional champions advanced to eight Super Regionals, each of which was conducted in a best-of-three-game series to determine the eight participants in the Men's College World Series. In the MCWS, two sets of four teams competed in double-elimination brackets, with the two bracket winners facing each other in a best-of-three-game series.

== Tournament procedure ==
Sixty-four teams entered the tournament, with 29 of them receiving an automatic bid by either winning their conference's tournament or by finishing in first place in their conference. The remaining 35 bids were at-large, with selections extended by the NCAA Selection Committee.

== National seeds ==
The sixteen national seeds were announced on the Selection Show on May 26. Teams in italics advanced to the Super Regionals. Teams in bold advanced to the 2025 Men's College World Series.

1. Vanderbilt
2. Texas
3. **Arkansas**
4. Auburn
5. North Carolina
6. **LSU**
7. Georgia
8. **Oregon State**
9. Florida State
10. Ole Miss
11. Clemson
12. Oregon
13. **Coastal Carolina**
14. Tennessee
15. **UCLA**
16. Southern Miss

== Schedule and venues ==
On May 25, the NCAA Division I Baseball Committee announced the sixteen regional host sites.

Regionals

- May 30–June 2
  - Foley Field, Athens, Georgia (Host: University of Georgia)
  - Plainsman Park, Auburn, Alabama (Host: Auburn University)
  - UFCU Disch–Falk Field, Austin, Texas (Host: University of Texas at Austin)
  - Alex Box Stadium, Baton Rouge, Louisiana (Host: Louisiana State University)
  - Boshamer Stadium, Chapel Hill, North Carolina (Host: University of North Carolina)
  - Doug Kingsmore Stadium, Clemson, South Carolina (Host: Clemson University)
  - Springs Brooks Stadium, Conway, South Carolina (Host: Coastal Carolina University)
  - Goss Stadium at Coleman Field, Corvallis, Oregon (Host: Oregon State University)
  - PK Park, Eugene, Oregon (Host: University of Oregon)
  - Baum–Walker Stadium, Fayetteville, Arkansas (Host: University of Arkansas)
  - Pete Taylor Park, Hattiesburg, Mississippi (Host: University of Southern Mississippi)
  - Lindsey Nelson Stadium, Knoxville, Tennessee (Host: University of Tennessee)
  - Jackie Robinson Stadium, Los Angeles, California (Host: University of California, Los Angeles)
  - Hawkins Field, Nashville, Tennessee (Host: Vanderbilt University)
  - Swayze Field, Oxford, Mississippi (Host: University of Mississippi)
  - Mike Martin Field at Dick Howser Stadium, Tallahassee, Florida (Host: Florida State University)

Super Regionals

- June 6–9
  - Plainsman Park, Auburn, Alabama (Host: Auburn University)
  - Alex Box Stadium, Baton Rouge, Louisiana (Host: Louisiana State University)
  - Boshamer Stadium, Chapel Hill, North Carolina (Host: University of North Carolina)
  - Goss Stadium at Coleman Field, Corvallis, Oregon (Host: Oregon State University)
  - Jack Coombs Field, Durham, North Carolina (Host: Duke University)
  - Baum–Walker Stadium, Fayetteville, Arkansas (Host: University of Arkansas)
  - Jackie Robinson Stadium, Los Angeles, California (Host: University of California, Los Angeles)
  - Jim Patterson Stadium, Louisville, Kentucky (Host: University of Louisville)

Men's College World Series

- June 13–23
  - Charles Schwab Field Omaha, Omaha, Nebraska (Host: Creighton University)

== Bids ==
=== Automatic bids ===
School	Conference	Record (Conf)	Berth	Last NCAA Appearance
Binghamton	America East	29–24 (13–11)	Tournament	2022 (Stanford Regional)
East Carolina	American	32–25 (13–14)	Tournament	2024 (Greenville Regional)
Stetson	ASUN	40–20 (24–6)	Tournament	2024 (Tallahassee Regional)
North Carolina	ACC	42–12 (18–11)	Tournament	2024 Men's College World Series
Rhode Island	Atlantic 10	38–20 (22–8)	Tournament	2016 (Columbia Regional)
Arizona	Big 12	39–18 (18–12)	Tournament	2024 (Tucson Regional)
Creighton	Big East	41–14 (17–4)	Tournament	2019 (Corvallis Regional)
USC Upstate	Big South	36–23 (19–5)	Tournament	First appearance
Nebraska	Big Ten	32–27 (15–15)	Tournament	2024 (Stillwater Regional)
Cal Poly	Big West	41–17 (23–7)	Tournament	2014 (San Luis Obispo Regional)
Northeastern	CAA	48–9 (25–2)	Tournament	2023 (Winston-Salem Regional)
Western Kentucky	CUSA	46–12 (18–9)	Tournament	2009 (Oxford Regional)
Wright State	Horizon	37–19 (25–5)	Tournament	2023 (Terre Haute Regional)
Columbia	Ivy League	27–17 (16–5)	Tournament	2022 (Blacksburg Regional)
Fairfield	MAAC	39–17 (21–8)	Tournament	2021 (Austin Regional)
Miami (OH)	MAC	35–21 (23–7)	Tournament	2005 (Austin Regional)
Murray State	Missouri Valley	39–13 (17–8)	Tournament	2003 (Hattiesburg Regional)
Fresno State	Mountain West	31–27 (18–12)	Tournament	2024 (Santa Barbara Regional)
Central Connecticut	Northeast	31–15 (23–7)	Tournament	2023 (Columbia Regional)
Little Rock	Ohio Valley	24–32 (8–16)	Tournament	2011 (Corvallis Regional)
Holy Cross	Patriot	31–23 (17–8)	Tournament	2017 (Corvallis Regional)
Vanderbilt	SEC	42–16 (19–11)	Tournament	2024 (Clemson Regional)
East Tennessee State	SoCon	41–15 (14–7)	Tournament	2013 (Nashville Regional)
Houston Christian	Southland	32–23 (17–13)	Tournament	2015 (Houston Regional)
Bethune–Cookman	SWAC	37–21 (24–5)	Tournament	2011 (Tallahassee Regional)
North Dakota State	Summit	20–32 (13–15)	Tournament	2021 (Stanford Regional)
Coastal Carolina	Sun Belt	49–11 (26–4)	Tournament	2024 (Clemson Regional)
Saint Mary's	West Coast	35–24 (15–9)	Tournament	2016 (Raleigh Regional)
Utah Valley	WAC	32–27 (13–11)	Tournament	2016 (Baton Rouge Regional)

=== At-large ===
Team	Conference	Record (Conf)	Last NCAA Appearance
Alabama	SEC	41–16 (16-14)	2024 (Tallahassee Regional)
Arkansas	SEC	43–13 (20–10)	2024 (Fayetteville Regional)
Arizona State	Big 12	35–22 (18–12)	2021 (Austin Regional)
Auburn	SEC	38–18 (17–13)	2023 (Auburn Regional)
Cincinnati	Big 12	32–24 (16–14)	2019 (Corvallis Regional)
Clemson	ACC	44–16 (18–12)	2024 (Clemson Super Regional)
Dallas Baptist	C-USA	40–16 (21–6)	2024 (Tucson Regional)
Duke	ACC	36–18 (17–13)	2024 (Norman Regional)
Florida	SEC	38–20 (15–15)	2024 Men's College World Series
Florida State	ACC	38–14 (17–10)	2024 Men's College World Series
Georgia	SEC	42–15 (18–12)	2024 (Athens Super Regional)
Georgia Tech	ACC	40–17 (19–11)	2024 (Athens Regional)
Kansas	Big 12	43–15 (20–10)	2014 (Louisville Regional)
Kansas State	Big 12	31–24 (17–13)	2024 (Charlottesville Super Regional)
Kentucky	SEC	29–24 (13–17)	2024 Men's College World Series
LSU	SEC	43–14 (19–11)	2024 (Chapel Hill Regional)
Louisville	ACC	35–21 (15–15)	2022 (College Station Super Regional)
Miami (FL)	ACC	31–24 (15–14)	2023 (Coral Gables Regional)
Mississippi State	SEC	34–21 (15–15)	2024 (Charlottesville Regional)
NC State	ACC	33–19 (17–11)	2024 Men's College World Series
Oklahoma	SEC	35–20 (14–16)	2024 (Norman Regional)
Oklahoma State	Big 12	27–22 (15–12)	2024 (Stillwater Regional)
Ole Miss	SEC	40–18 (16–14)	2022 Men's College World Series
Oregon	Big Ten	42–14 (22–8)	2024 (Bryan-College Station Super Regional)
Oregon State	Independent	41–12–1 (0–0)	2024 (Lexington Super Regional)
Southern Miss	Sun Belt	44–14 (24–6)	2024 (Knoxville Regional)
Tennessee	SEC	43–16 (16–14)	2024 Men's College World Series
Texas	SEC	42–12 (22–8)	2024 (Bryan-College Station Regional)
TCU	Big 12	39–18 (19–11)	2023 Men's College World Series
UC Irvine	Big West	41–15 (24–6)	2024 (Corvallis Regional)
UCLA	Big Ten	42–16 (22–8)	2022 (Auburn Regional)
USC	Big Ten	34–20 (18–12)	2015 (Lake Elsinore Regional)
UTSA	American	44–13 (23–4)	2013 (Corvallis Regional)
Wake Forest	ACC	36–20 (16–14)	2024 (Greenville Regional)
West Virginia	Big 12	41–14 (19–9)	2024 (Chapel Hill Super Regional)

=== By conference ===
Conference	Total	Schools
SEC	13	Alabama, Arkansas, Auburn, Florida, Georgia, Kentucky, LSU, Mississippi State, Oklahoma, Ole Miss, Tennessee, Texas, Vanderbilt
ACC	9	Clemson, Duke, Florida State, Georgia Tech, Louisville, Miami (FL), NC State, North Carolina, Wake Forest
Big 12	8	Arizona, Arizona State, Cincinnati, Kansas, Kansas State, Oklahoma State, TCU, West Virginia
Big Ten	4	Nebraska, Oregon, UCLA, USC
American	2	East Carolina, UTSA
Big West	2	Cal Poly, UC Irvine
CUSA	2	Western Kentucky, Dallas Baptist
Sun Belt	2	Coastal Carolina, Southern Miss
America East	1	Binghamton
ASUN	1	Stetson
Atlantic 10	1	Rhode Island
Big East	1	Creighton
Big South	1	USC Upstate
Coastal	1	Northeastern
Horizon	1	Wright State
Ivy League	1	Columbia
Independent	1	Oregon State
Metro Atlantic	1	Fairfield
Mid-American	1	Miami (OH)
Missouri Valley	1	Murray State
Mountain West	1	Fresno State
Northeast	1	Central Connecticut
Ohio Valley	1	Little Rock
Patriot	1	Holy Cross
Southern	1	East Tennessee State
Southland	1	Houston Christian
SWAC	1	Bethune–Cookman
Summit	1	North Dakota State
WAC	1	Utah Valley
WCC	1	Saint Mary's

== Regionals and Super Regionals ==
Bold indicates winner. Seeds for regional tournaments indicate seeds within regional. Seeds for super regional tournaments indicate national seeds only. All times Eastern.

=== Auburn Super Regional ===
Hosted by Auburn at Plainsman Park

Regional	Regional
**1**	**Auburn**	**9**
4	Central Connecticut	5
**1**	**Auburn**	**8**
3	Stetson	5
**3**	**Stetson**	**11**
2	NC State	2
Auburn Regional – Plainsman Park
4	Central Connecticut	0
**2**	**NC State**	**12**
**2**	**NC State**	**17**
3	Stetson	12
**1**	**Coastal Carolina**	**10**
4	Fairfield	2
**1**	**Coastal Carolina**	**18**
3	East Carolina	7
**3**	**East Carolina**	**11**
2	Florida	6
Conway Regional – Springs Brooks Stadium
4	Fairfield	2
**2**	**Florida**	**17**
2	Florida	4
**3**	**East Carolina**	**11**

Regional Final
**1**	**Auburn**	**11**	–
2	NC State	1	–
**1**	**Coastal Carolina**	**1**	–
3	East Carolina	0	–

Super Regional; June 6–8
4	Auburn	6	1	–
**13**	**Coastal Carolina**	**7^{(10)}**	**4**	–

=== Chapel Hill Super Regional ===
Hosted by North Carolina at Boshamer Stadium

Regional	Regional
**1**	**North Carolina**	**4**
4	Holy Cross	0
**1**	**North Carolina**	**11**
2	Oklahoma	5
3	Nebraska	4
**2**	**Oklahoma**	**7**
Chapel Hill Regional – Boshamer Stadium
4	Holy Cross	1
**3**	**Nebraska**	**4**
3	Nebraska	1
**2**	**Oklahoma**	**17**
1	Oregon	5
**4**	**Utah Valley**	**6**
4	Utah Valley	4
**2**	**Arizona**	**14**
3	Cal Poly	2
**2**	**Arizona**	**3**
Eugene Regional – PK Park
1	Oregon	8
**3**	**Cal Poly**	**10**
**3**	**Cal Poly**	**7^{11}**
4	Utah Valley	6

Regional Final
**1**	**North Carolina**	5	**14**
2	Oklahoma	**9**	4
**2**	**Arizona**	**14**	–
3	Cal Poly	0	–

Super Regional; June 6–8
5	North Carolina	**18**	8	3
**Arizona**	2	**10**	**4**

=== Corvallis Super Regional ===
Hosted by Oregon State at Goss Stadium

Regional	Regional
1	Oregon State	4
**4**	**Saint Mary's (CA)**	**6**
4	Saint Mary's (CA)	4
**3**	**USC**	**6**
**3**	**USC**	**13**
2	TCU	1
Corvallis Regional – Goss Stadium
**1**	**Oregon State**	**7**
2	TCU	2
**1**	**Oregon State**	**20**
4	Saint Mary's (CA)	3
**1**	**Florida State**	**6**
4	Bethune–Cookman	2
**1**	**Florida State**	**10**
3	Mississippi State	3
**3**	**Mississippi State**	**11**
2	Northeastern	2
Tallahassee Regional – Dick Howser Stadium
4	Bethune–Cookman	3
**2**	**Northeastern**	**4**
2	Northeastern	2
**3**	**Mississippi State**	**3**

Regional Final
3	USC	1	0
**1**	**Oregon State**	**14**	**9**
**1**	**Florida State**	**5**	–
3	Mississippi State	2	–

Super Regional; June 6–8
**8**	**Oregon State**	**5^{(10)}**	1	**14**
9	Florida State	4	**3**	10

=== Louisville Super Regional ===
Hosted by Louisville at Jim Patterson Stadium

Regional	Regional
**1**	**Vanderbilt**	**4**
4	Wright State	3
1	Vanderbilt	2
**2**	**Louisville**	**3**
3	East Tennessee State	3
**2**	**Louisville**	**8**
Nashville Regional – Hawkins Field
**4**	**Wright State**	**7**
3	East Tennessee State	5
**4**	**Wright State**	**5**
1	Vanderbilt	4
1	Southern Miss	4
**4**	**Columbia**	**11**
4	Columbia	1
**3**	**Miami (FL)**	**14**
**3**	**Miami (FL)**	**5**
2	Alabama	3
Hattiesburg Regional – Pete Taylor Park
**1**	**Southern Miss**	**6**
2	Alabama	5
**1**	**Southern Miss**	**8**
4	Columbia	1

Regional Final
**2**	**Louisville**	**6**	–
4	Wright State	0	–
**3**	**Miami (FL)**	6	**5**
1	Southern Miss	**17**	4

Super Regional; June 6–8
**Louisville**	**8**	6	**3**
Miami (FL)	1	**9**	2

=== Los Angeles Super Regional ===
Hosted by UCLA at Jackie Robinson Stadium

Regional	Regional
**1**	**Texas**	**7**
4	Houston Christian	1
1	Texas	7
**2**	**UTSA**	**9**
3	Kansas State	2
**2**	**UTSA**	**10**
Austin Regional – UFCU Disch–Falk Field
4	Houston Christian	4
**3**	**Kansas State**	**7**
3	Kansas State	8
**1**	**Texas**	**15**
**1**	**UCLA**	**19**
4	Fresno State	4
**1**	**UCLA**	**11**
3	Arizona State	5
**3**	**Arizona State**	**4**
2	UC Irvine	2
Los Angeles Regional – Jackie Robinson Stadium
4	Fresno State	3
**2**	**UC Irvine**	**8**
**2**	**UC Irvine**	**11**
3	Arizona State	6

Regional Final
**2**	**UTSA**	**7**	–
1	Texas	4	–
**1**	**UCLA**	**8**	–
2	UC Irvine	5	–

Super Regional; June 7–9
UTSA	2	0	–
**15**	**UCLA**	**5**	**7**	–

=== Durham Super Regional ===
Hosted by Duke at Jack Coombs Field

Regional	Regional
**1**	**Georgia**	**20**
4	Binghamton	4
1	Georgia	3
**2**	**Duke**	**6**
3	Oklahoma State	5
**2**	**Duke**	**12**
Athens Regional – Foley Field
4	Binghamton	5
**3**	**Oklahoma State**	**13**
**3**	**Oklahoma State**	**11**
1	Georgia	9
1	Ole Miss	6
**4**	**Murray State**	**9**
**4**	**Murray State**	**13**
2	Georgia Tech	11
3	Western Kentucky	2
**2**	**Georgia Tech**	**9**
Oxford Regional – Swayze Field
**1**	**Ole Miss**	**8**
3	Western Kentucky	6
**1**	**Ole Miss**	**11**
2	Georgia Tech	9

Regional Final
**2**	**Duke**	**3**	–
3	Oklahoma State	2	–
**4**	**Murray State**	8	**12**
1	Ole Miss	**19**	11

Super Regional; June 7–9
Duke	**7**	9	4
**Murray State**	4	**19**	**5**

=== Fayetteville Super Regional ===
Hosted by Arkansas at Baum–Walker Stadium

Regional	Regional
**1**	**Arkansas**	**6**
4	North Dakota State	2
**1**	**Arkansas**	**12**
3	Creighton	1
**3**	**Creighton**	**11**
2	Kansas	4
Fayetteville Regional – Baum–Walker Stadium
**4**	**North Dakota State**	**4**
2	Kansas	3
4	North Dakota State	10
**3**	**Creighton**	**11**
**1**	**Tennessee**	**9**
4	Miami (OH)	2
**1**	**Tennessee**	**10**
3	Cincinnati	6
**3**	**Cincinnati**	**11**
2	Wake Forest	6
Knoxville Regional – Lindsey Nelson Stadium
4	Miami (OH)	13
**2**	**Wake Forest**	**14**
**2**	**Wake Forest**	**10**
3	Cincinnati	3

Regional Final
**1**	**Arkansas**	**8**	–
3	Creighton	3	–
**1**	**Tennessee**	6	**11**
2	Wake Forest	**7**	5

Super Regional; June 7–9
**3**	**Arkansas**	**4**	**11**	–
14	Tennessee	3	4	–

=== Baton Rouge Super Regional ===
Hosted by Louisiana State University at Alex Box Stadium

Regional	Regional
**1**	**LSU**	**7**
4	Little Rock	0
**1**	**LSU**	**12**
2	Dallas Baptist	0
3	Rhode Island	2
**2**	**Dallas Baptist**	**6**
Baton Rouge Regional – Alex Box Stadium
**4**	**Little Rock**	**22**
3	Rhode Island	10
**4**	**Little Rock**	**8**
2	Dallas Baptist	6
**1**	**Clemson**	**7**
4	USC Upstate	3
1	Clemson	6
**2**	**West Virginia**	**9**
3	Kentucky	3
**2**	**West Virginia**	**4**
Clemson Regional – Doug Kingsmore Stadium
4	USC Upstate	3
**3**	**Kentucky**	**7**
**3**	**Kentucky**	**16**
1	Clemson	4

Regional Final
**1**	**LSU**	4	**10**
4	Little Rock	**10**	6
**2**	**West Virginia**	**13**	–
3	Kentucky	12	–

Super Regional; June 7–9
**6**	**LSU**	**16**	**12**	–
West Virginia	9	5	–

== Men's College World Series ==
The Men's College World Series was held at Charles Schwab Field in Omaha, Nebraska.

=== Participants ===
School	Conference	Record (Conf)	Head Coach	Super Regional	Previous MCWS Appearances	MCWS Best Finish	MCWS W–L Record
Coastal Carolina	Sun Belt	53–11 (26–4)	Kevin Schnall	Auburn	1 (last: 2016)	1st (2016)	6–2
Arizona	Big 12	44–19 (18–12)	Chip Hale	Chapel Hill	18 (last: 2021)	1st (1976, 1980, 1986, 2012)	43–32
Oregon State	Independent	47–14–1	Mitch Canham	Corvallis	7 (last: 2018)	1st (2006, 2007, 2018)	21–12
Louisville	ACC	40–22 (15–15)	Dan McDonnell	Louisville	5 (last: 2019)	3rd (2019)	4–10
UCLA	Big Ten	47–16 (22–8)	John Savage	Los Angeles	6 (last: 2013)	1st (2013)	9–9
Murray State	Missouri Valley	44–15 (17–8)	Dan Skirka	Durham	First appearance		
Arkansas	SEC	48–13 (20–10)	Dave Van Horn	Fayetteville	11 (last: 2022)	2nd (1979, 2018)	15–18
LSU	SEC	48–15 (19–11)	Jay Johnson	Baton Rouge	19 (last: 2023)	1st (1991, 1993, 1996, 1997, 2000, 2009, 2023)	46–29

=== Bracket ===
Sources: Seeds listed below indicate national seeds only. All times Central.

First round	Second round
**13**	**Coastal Carolina**	**7**
Arizona	4
**13**	**Coastal Carolina**	**6**
8	Oregon State	2
**8**	**Oregon State**	**4**
Louisville	3
Bracket 1
Arizona	3
**Louisville**	**8**
**Louisville**	**7**
8	Oregon State	6
**15**	**UCLA**	**6**
Murray State	4
15	UCLA	5
**6**	**LSU**	**9**
3	Arkansas	1
**6**	**LSU**	**4**
Bracket 2
Murray State	0
**3**	**Arkansas**	**3**
**3**	**Arkansas**	**7**
15	UCLA	3

Semifinals
**13**	**Coastal Carolina**	**11**	–
Louisville	3	–
**6**	**LSU**	**6**	–
3	Arkansas	5	–

Finals
13	Coastal Carolina	0	3	–
**6**	**LSU**	**1**	**5**	–

=== Game results ===
==== Bracket 1 ====
June 13, 2025; 1:00 pm CDT (UTC-5); Game 1	Arizona	**4–7**	**No. 13 Coastal Carolina**	Charles Schwab Field Omaha; Attendance: 24,058; Umpires: HP: Gregory Street; 1B: Casey Moser; 2B: Clint Fagan; 3B: Brian deBrauwere
June 13, 2025; 1:00 pm CDT (UTC-5); Game 1	LP: Garrett Hicks (5−1)	Box Score	WP: Cameron Flukey (8−1); Sv: Dominick Carbone (6)	Charles Schwab Field Omaha; Attendance: 24,058; Umpires: HP: Gregory Street; 1B: Casey Moser; 2B: Clint Fagan; 3B: Brian deBrauwere
June 13, 2025; 1:00 pm CDT (UTC-5); Game 1	HR: White (20)	Box Score		Charles Schwab Field Omaha; Attendance: 24,058; Umpires: HP: Gregory Street; 1B: Casey Moser; 2B: Clint Fagan; 3B: Brian deBrauwere

June 13, 2025; 6:00 pm CDT (UTC-5); Game 2	Louisville	**3–4**	**No. 8 Oregon State**	Charles Schwab Field Omaha; Attendance: 24,963; Umpires: HP: Angel Campos; 1B: Jeff Head; 2B: Scott Letendre; 3B: Kellen Levy
June 13, 2025; 6:00 pm CDT (UTC-5); Game 2	LP: Jake Schweitzer (4−3)	Box Score	WP: Kellan Oakes (5−0)	Charles Schwab Field Omaha; Attendance: 24,963; Umpires: HP: Angel Campos; 1B: Jeff Head; 2B: Scott Letendre; 3B: Kellen Levy

June 15, 2025; 1:00 pm CDT (UTC-5); Game 5	Arizona	**3–8**	**Louisville**	Charles Schwab Field Omaha; Attendance: 23,647; Umpires: HP: Clint Fagan; 1B: Brian deBrauwere; 2B: Gregory Street; 3B: Casey Moser
June 15, 2025; 1:00 pm CDT (UTC-5); Game 5	LP: Garrett Hicks (5−2)	Box Score	WP: Tucker Biven (4−0)	Charles Schwab Field Omaha; Attendance: 23,647; Umpires: HP: Clint Fagan; 1B: Brian deBrauwere; 2B: Gregory Street; 3B: Casey Moser

June 15, 2025; 6:00 pm CDT (UTC-5); Game 6	**No. 13 Coastal Carolina**	**6–2**	No. 8 Oregon State	Charles Schwab Field Omaha; Attendance: 24,490; Umpires: HP: Scott Letendre; 1B: Kellen Levy; 2B: Angel Campos; 3B: Jeff Head
June 15, 2025; 6:00 pm CDT (UTC-5); Game 6	WP: Jacob Morrison (12−0); Sv: Ryan Lynch (9)	Box Score	LP: Ethan Kleinschmidt (8−5)	Charles Schwab Field Omaha; Attendance: 24,490; Umpires: HP: Scott Letendre; 1B: Kellen Levy; 2B: Angel Campos; 3B: Jeff Head
June 15, 2025; 6:00 pm CDT (UTC-5); Game 6		Box Score	HR: Turley (20), Tait (8)	Charles Schwab Field Omaha; Attendance: 24,490; Umpires: HP: Scott Letendre; 1B: Kellen Levy; 2B: Angel Campos; 3B: Jeff Head

June 17, 2025; 1:00 pm CDT (UTC-5); Game 9	**Louisville**	**7–6**	No. 8 Oregon State	Charles Schwab Field Omaha; Attendance: 22,945; Umpires: HP: Casey Moser; 1B: Clint Fagan; 2B: Angel Campos; 3B: Brian deBrauwere
June 17, 2025; 1:00 pm CDT (UTC-5); Game 9	WP: Tucker Biven (5−0)	Box Score	LP: Kellan Oakes (5−1)	Charles Schwab Field Omaha; Attendance: 22,945; Umpires: HP: Casey Moser; 1B: Clint Fagan; 2B: Angel Campos; 3B: Brian deBrauwere
June 17, 2025; 1:00 pm CDT (UTC-5); Game 9	HR: Munroe (13), Rose (13)	Box Score	HR: Arquette (19), Krieg (14)	Charles Schwab Field Omaha; Attendance: 22,945; Umpires: HP: Casey Moser; 1B: Clint Fagan; 2B: Angel Campos; 3B: Brian deBrauwere

June 18, 2025; 1:00 pm CDT (UTC-5); Game 11	**No. 13 Coastal Carolina**	**11–3**	Louisville	Charles Schwab Field Omaha; Attendance: 23,660; Umpires: HP: Angel Campos; 1B: Kellen Levy; 2B: Brian deBrauwere; 3B: Scott Letendre
June 18, 2025; 1:00 pm CDT (UTC-5); Game 11	WP: Riley Eikhoff (7−2)	Box Score	LP: Colton Hartman (2−1)	Charles Schwab Field Omaha; Attendance: 23,660; Umpires: HP: Angel Campos; 1B: Kellen Levy; 2B: Brian deBrauwere; 3B: Scott Letendre

==== Bracket 2 ====
June 14, 2025; 1:00 pm CDT (UTC-5); Game 3	**No. 15 UCLA**	**6–4**	Murray State	Charles Schwab Field Omaha; Attendance: 24,346; Umpires: HP: Casey Moser; 1B: Clint Fagan; 2B: Brian deBrauwere; 3B: Gregory Street
June 14, 2025; 1:00 pm CDT (UTC-5); Game 3	WP: Ian May (8–3); Sv: Easton Hawk (8)	Box Score	LP: Nic Schutte (8–4)	Charles Schwab Field Omaha; Attendance: 24,346; Umpires: HP: Casey Moser; 1B: Clint Fagan; 2B: Brian deBrauwere; 3B: Gregory Street

June 14, 2025; 6:00 pm CDT (UTC-5); Game 4	**No. 6 LSU**	**4–1**	No. 3 Arkansas	Charles Schwab Field Omaha; Attendance: 25,464; Umpires: HP: Jeff Head; 1B: Scott Letendre; 2B: Kellen Levy; 3B: Angel Campos
June 14, 2025; 6:00 pm CDT (UTC-5); Game 4	WP: Kade Anderson (11–1); Sv: Casan Evans (7)	Box Score	LP: Zach Root (8–6)	Charles Schwab Field Omaha; Attendance: 25,464; Umpires: HP: Jeff Head; 1B: Scott Letendre; 2B: Kellen Levy; 3B: Angel Campos
June 14, 2025; 6:00 pm CDT (UTC-5); Game 4		Box Score	HR: Robinett (3)	Charles Schwab Field Omaha; Attendance: 25,464; Umpires: HP: Jeff Head; 1B: Scott Letendre; 2B: Kellen Levy; 3B: Angel Campos

June 16, 2025; 1:00 pm CDT (UTC-5); Game 7	Murray State	**0–3**	**No. 3 Arkansas**	Charles Schwab Field Omaha; Attendance: 24,074; Umpires: HP: Brian deBrauwere; 1B: Gregory Street; 2B: Casey Moser; 3B: Clint Fagan
June 16, 2025; 1:00 pm CDT (UTC-5); Game 7	LP: Isaac Silva (9−3)	Box Score	WP: Gage Wood (4−1)	Charles Schwab Field Omaha; Attendance: 24,074; Umpires: HP: Brian deBrauwere; 1B: Gregory Street; 2B: Casey Moser; 3B: Clint Fagan

June 17, 2025; 10:00 am CDT (UTC-5); Game 8	No. 15 UCLA	**5–9**	**No. 6 LSU**	Charles Schwab Field Omaha; Attendance: 24,623; Umpires: HP: Kellen Levy; 1B: Angel Campos; 2B: Jeff Head; 3B: Scott Letendre
June 17, 2025; 10:00 am CDT (UTC-5); Game 8	LP: Landon Stump (6−2)	Box Score	WP: Casan Evans (5−1)	Charles Schwab Field Omaha; Attendance: 24,623; Umpires: HP: Kellen Levy; 1B: Angel Campos; 2B: Jeff Head; 3B: Scott Letendre
June 17, 2025; 10:00 am CDT (UTC-5); Game 8		Box Score	HR: Jones (21)	Charles Schwab Field Omaha; Attendance: 24,623; Umpires: HP: Kellen Levy; 1B: Angel Campos; 2B: Jeff Head; 3B: Scott Letendre

June 17, 2025; 6:00 pm CDT (UTC-5); Game 10	**No. 3 Arkansas**	**7–3**	No. 15 UCLA	Charles Schwab Field Omaha; Attendance: 24,171; Umpires: HP: Gregory Street; 1B: Jeff Head; 2B: Scott Letendre; 3B: Kellen Levy
June 17, 2025; 6:00 pm CDT (UTC-5); Game 10	WP: Zach Root (9–6)	Box Score	LP: Cody Delvecchio (1–4)	Charles Schwab Field Omaha; Attendance: 24,171; Umpires: HP: Gregory Street; 1B: Jeff Head; 2B: Scott Letendre; 3B: Kellen Levy
June 17, 2025; 6:00 pm CDT (UTC-5); Game 10	HR: W. Aloy (21)	Box Score		Charles Schwab Field Omaha; Attendance: 24,171; Umpires: HP: Gregory Street; 1B: Jeff Head; 2B: Scott Letendre; 3B: Kellen Levy

June 18, 2025; 6:00 pm CDT (UTC-5); Game 12	**No. 6 LSU**	**6–5**	No. 3 Arkansas	Charles Schwab Field Omaha; Attendance: 25,740; Umpires: HP: Clint Fagan; 1B: Casey Moser; 2B: Jeff Head; 3B: Gregory Street
June 18, 2025; 6:00 pm CDT (UTC-5); Game 12	WP: Jacob Mayers (2−0)	Box Score	LP: Cole Gibler (3−2)	Charles Schwab Field Omaha; Attendance: 25,740; Umpires: HP: Clint Fagan; 1B: Casey Moser; 2B: Jeff Head; 3B: Gregory Street
June 18, 2025; 6:00 pm CDT (UTC-5); Game 12	HR: J. Jones (22)	Box Score	HR: Helfrick (15)	Charles Schwab Field Omaha; Attendance: 25,740; Umpires: HP: Clint Fagan; 1B: Casey Moser; 2B: Jeff Head; 3B: Gregory Street

==== Finals ====
===== Game 1 =====
June 21, 2025, 6:00 p.m. (CDT) at Charles Schwab Field Omaha in Omaha, Nebraska
Team	1	2	3	4	5	6	7	8	9	R	H	E
No. 13 Coastal Carolina	0	0	0	0	0	0	0	0	0	**0**	**3**	**1**
**No. 6 LSU**	1	0	0	0	0	0	0	0	0	**1**	**6**	**0**
WP: Kade Anderson (12−1) LP: Cameron Flukey (8−2) Sv: None; Home runs: CC: None; LSU: None; Attendance: 25,761; Notes: HP: Brian deBrauwere; 1B: Jeff Head; 2B: Gregory Street; 3B: Casey Moser; LF: Kellen Levy; RF: Scott Letendre; Boxscore

===== Game 2 =====
June 22, 2025, 1:30 p.m. (CDT) at Charles Schwab Field Omaha in Omaha, Nebraska
Team	1	2	3	4	5	6	7	8	9	R	H	E
**No. 6 LSU**	0	0	1	4	0	0	0	0	0	**5**	**10**	**0**
No. 13 Coastal Carolina	0	1	0	0	0	0	2	0	0	**3**	**8**	**2**
WP: Anthony Eyanson (12−2) LP: Jacob Morrison (12−1) Sv: Chase Shores (2); Home runs: LSU: None; CC: Mihos (4), Sykes (5); Attendance: 24,734; Notes: HP: Angel Campos; 1B: Casey Moser; 2B: Kellen Levy; 3B: Clint Fagan; LF: Brian deBrauwere; RF: Gregory Street; Boxscore

== All-Tournament Team ==
The following players were members of the Men's College World Series All-Tournament Team.

Position	Player	School
P	Gage Wood	Arkansas
P	Kade Anderson	LSU
C	Adonys Guzman	Arizona
1B	Jared Jones	LSU
2B	Kamau Neighbors	Louisville
3B	Jake Munroe	Louisville
SS	Steven Milam	LSU
OF	Derek Curiel	LSU
OF	Eddie King Jr.	Louisville
OF	Justin Thomas Jr.	Arkansas
DH	Dean Mihos	Coastal Carolina

== Final standings ==
Seeds listed below indicate national seeds only

Place	School	Record
1st	No. 6 LSU	10–1
2nd	No. 13 Coastal Carolina	8–2
3rd	No. 3 Arkansas	7–2
3rd	Louisville	7–3
5th	No. 8 Oregon State	7–4
5th	No. 15 UCLA	6–2
7th	Arizona	5–3
7th	Murray State	5–3
9th	No. 4 Auburn	3–2
9th	Duke	4–2
9th	No. 9 Florida State	4–2
9th	Miami (FL)	4–3
9th	No. 5 North Carolina	4–3
9th	No. 14 Tennessee	3–3
9th	UTSA	3–2
9th	West Virginia	3–2
17th	Cal Poly	2–2
17th	Creighton	2–2
17th	East Carolina	2–2
17th	Kentucky	2–2
17th	Little Rock	3–2
17th	NC State	2–2
17th	Mississippi State	2–2
17th	Oklahoma	3–2
17th	Oklahoma State	2–2
17th	No. 10 Ole Miss	3–2
17th	No. 16 Southern Miss	3–2
17th	No. 2 Texas	2–2
17th	No. 23 UC Irvine	2–2
17th	USC	2–2
17th	Wake Forest	3–2
17th	Wright State	2–2
33rd	Arizona State	1–2
33rd	Cincinnati	1–2
33rd	No. 11 Clemson	1–2
33rd	Columbia	1–2
33rd	Dallas Baptist	1–2
33rd	Florida	1–2
33rd	No. 7 Georgia	1–2
33rd	Georgia Tech	1–2
33rd	Kansas State	1–2
33rd	Nebraska	1–2
33rd	North Dakota State	1–2
33rd	Northeastern	1–2
33rd	Saint Mary's (CA)	1–2
33rd	Stetson	1–2
33rd	Utah Valley	1–2
33rd	No. 1 Vanderbilt	1–2
49th	Alabama	0–2
49th	Bethune–Cookman	0–2
49th	Binghamton	0–2
49th	Central Connecticut	0–2
49th	East Tennessee State	0–2
49th	Fairfield	0–2
49th	Fresno State	0–2
49th	Holy Cross	0–2
49th	Houston Christian	0–2
49th	Kansas	0–2
49th	Miami (OH)	0–2
49th	No. 12 Oregon	0–2
49th	Rhode Island	0–2
49th	TCU	0–2
49th	USC Upstate	0–2
49th	Western Kentucky	0–2

== Record by conference ==
Conference	# of Bids	Record	Win %	Nc Record	Nc Win %	RF	SR	WS	NS	CS	NC
SEC	13	38–26	.594	34–22	.607	9	4	2	2	1	1
Sun Belt	2	11–4	.733	11–4	.733	2	1	1	1	1	–
ACC	9	30–21	.588	27–18	.600	7	5	1	1	–	–
Independent	1	7–4	.636	7–4	.636	1	1	1	–	–	–
Missouri Valley	1	5–4	.555	5–4	.555	1	1	1	–	–	–
Big Ten	4	9–8	.529	9–8	.529	2	1	1	–	–	–
Big 12	8	13–17	.433	13–17	.433	3	2	1	–	–	–
American	2	5–4	.555	5–4	.555	2	1	–	–	–	–
Big West	2	4–4	.500	4–4	.500	2	–	–	–	–	–
Ohio Valley	1	3–2	.600	3–2	.600	1	–	–	–	–	–
Big East	1	2–2	.500	2–2	.500	1	–	–	–	–	–
Horizon	1	2–2	.500	2–2	.500	1	–	–	–	–	–
ASUN	1	1–2	.333	1–2	.333	–	–	–	–	–	–
CAA	1	1–2	.333	1–2	.333	–	–	–	–	–	–
Ivy League	1	1–2	.333	1–2	.333	–	–	–	–	–	–
Summit	1	1–2	.333	1–2	.333	–	–	–	–	–	–
West Coast	1	1–2	.333	1–2	.333	–	–	–	–	–	–
WAC	1	1–2	.333	1–2	.333	–	–	–	–	–	–
CUSA	2	1–4	.200	1–4	.200	–	–	–	–	–	–
Atlantic 10	1	0–2	.000	0–2	.000	–	–	–	–	–	–
America East	1	0–2	.000	0–2	.000	–	–	–	–	–	–
Big South	1	0–2	.000	0–2	.000	–	–	–	–	–	–
MAC	1	0–2	.000	0–2	.000	–	–	–	–	–	–
MAAC	1	0–2	.000	0–2	.000	–	–	–	–	–	–
Mountain West	1	0–2	.000	0–2	.000	–	–	–	–	–	–
Northeast	1	0–2	.000	0–2	.000	–	–	–	–	–	–
Patriot	1	0–2	.000	0–2	.000	–	–	–	–	–	–
Southland	1	0–2	.000	0–2	.000	–	–	–	–	–	–
SoCon	1	0–2	.000	0–2	.000	–	–	–	–	–	–
SWAC	1	0–2	.000	0–2	.000	–	–	–	–	–	–

== Media coverage ==
=== Radio ===
NRG Media provided nationwide radio coverage of the Men's College World Series through its Omaha Station KOZN, in association with Westwood One. It also streamed all MCWS games at westwoodonesports.com, Tunein, the Varsity Network, and on SiriusXM.

=== Television ===
ESPN networks aired every game from the Regionals, Super Regionals, and the Men's College World Series.

==== Broadcast assignments ====
Regionals

- Mike Ferrin and Jensen Lewis: Athens, Georgia
- Roy Philpott and Jackie Bradley Jr.: Auburn, Alabama
- Victor Rojas and Keith Moreland: Austin, Texas
- Dave Neal and Ben McDonald: Baton Rouge, Louisiana
- Wes Durham and Danan Hughes: Chapel Hill, North Carolina
- Eric Frede and Lance Cormier: Clemson, South Carolina
- Richard Cross and Todd Walker: Conway, South Carolina
- Mark Neely and Greg Swindell: Corvallis, Oregon
- Roxy Bernstein and Wes Clements: Eugene, Oregon
- Kevin Fitzgerald and Bobby Moranda: Fayetteville, Arkansas
- Tom Hart and Gaby Sánchez: Hattiesburg, Mississippi
- Mike Monaco and Kyle Peterson: Knoxville, Tennessee
- Dani Wexelman and Xavier Scruggs: Los Angeles, California
- Clay Matvick and Gregg Olson: Nashville, Tennessee
- Derek Jones and Jay Walker: Oxford, Mississippi
- Lowell Galindo and Devon Travis: Tallahassee, Florida

Super Regionals

- Roy Philpott and Lance Cormier: Auburn, Alabama
- Dave Neal and Ben McDonald: Baton Rouge, Louisiana
- Eric Frede and Jensen Lewis: Chapel Hill, North Carolina
- Roxy Bernstein and Devon Travis: Corvallis, Oregon
- Clay Matvick and Gregg Olson: Durham, North Carolina
- Tom Hart, Kyle Peterson and Chris Burke: Fayetteville, Arkansas
- Victor Rojas and Todd Walker: Los Angeles, California
- Mike Ferrin and Gaby Sánchez: Louisville, Kentucky

Men's College World Series

- Karl Ravech, Eduardo Pérez, Ben McDonald, and Dani Wexelman: June 13 & 14 afternoons
- Mike Monaco, Kyle Peterson, Chris Burke, and Kris Budden: June 13–15 evenings
- Mike Monaco, Ben McDonald, and Dani Wexelman: June 15 afternoon
- Mike Monaco, Ben McDonald, Chris Burke, and Dani Wexelman: June 16 & 17 afternoons
- Karl Ravech, Eduardo Pérez, Kyle Peterson, and Kris Budden: June 16 & 17 evenings
- Mike Monaco, Eduardo Pérez, Ben McDonald, and Dani Wexelman: June 18 afternoon
- Karl Ravech, Kyle Peterson, Chris Burke, and Kris Budden: June 18 evening

MCWS Championship Series

- Karl Ravech, Kyle Peterson, Chris Burke, and Kris Budden

== See also ==
- 2025 NCAA Division I softball tournament
- 2025 NCAA Division II baseball tournament
- 2025 NCAA Division III baseball tournament
- 2025 NAIA baseball tournament
