= Reagan Field =

Baseball park at Murray State University

- Interactive map of Reagan Field
- Full name: Johnny Reagan Field
- Location: Gilbert Graves Circle, Murray, Kentucky, USA
- Coordinates: 36.622709°N 88.317874°W
- Owner: Murray State University
- Operator: Murray State University
- Capacity: 800
- Surface: Natural grass
- Scoreboard: Electronic
- Field size: 330 ft. (LF); 375 ft. (LCF); 400 ft. (CF); 375 ft. (RCF); 330 ft. (RF)

Construction
- Groundbreaking: 1988
- Opened: March 11, 1989
- Renovated: 2006

Tenant
- Murray State Racers baseball (NCAA DI OVC/MVC) (1989–present)

Johnny Reagan Field is a baseball venue in Murray, Kentucky, United States. It is home to the Murray State Racers baseball team of the NCAA Division I Missouri Valley Conference. The venue is named for Murray State alumnus and former baseball coach Johnny Reagan. Built in 1989, it has a capacity of 800 spectators.

== History ==
The field was built in 1988–1989 and hosted its first game on March 11, 1989, in which Murray State lost to Eastern Illinois 13–11.

=== Naming ===
Johnny Reagan won his 700th career game in a game played at the field on March 30, 1989. The field was formally dedicated to Reagan on April 15, 1989. The field's predecessor had also been named Johnny Reagan Field, since 1969. Reagan coached the program from prior to the 1958 season to after the 1993 season.

== Features ==
The field features an electronic scoreboard, natural grass surface, press box, and dugouts. In 2006, a new PA system and backstop were installed. Further upgrades included the installation of lights and a permanent grandstand in 2014, and a more spacious press box was added the following year. The outfield fence stands at 10 feet in most areas, but rises to 16 feet in center field

Reagan Field lies next to Roy Stewart Stadium and the CFSB Center, the university's football and basketball venues, respectively.

== See also ==
- List of NCAA Division I baseball venues
