= Dan Skirka =

American baseball coach (born 1985)

Current position
- Title: Head coach
- Team: Murray State
- Conference: Missouri Valley
- Record: 206–151

Biographical details
- Born: May 20, 1985 (age 40); Coldwater, Michigan, U.S.

Playing career
- 2004–2005: Kellogg Community College
- 2006–2007: Grand Valley State
- Position: Shortstop

Coaching career (HC unless noted)
- 2008: Grand Rapids Community College (asst.)
- 2009: Ouachita Baptist (asst.)
- 2010–2014: Murray State (asst.)
- 2015–2018: Walters State Community College (asst.)
- 2019–present: Murray State

Head coaching record
- Overall: 206–151
- Tournaments: MVC: 6–4; OVC: 4–4; NCAA: 5–4

Accomplishments and honors

Championships
- MVC (2025); MVC tournament (2025)

Awards
- Missouri Valley Coach of the Year (2025); First Team All-GLIAC (2007)

Daniel Skirka is an American college baseball coach and former shortstop. Skirka is the head coach of the Murray State Racers baseball team.

== Playing career ==
Skirka attended Union City High School in Union City, Michigan. Skirka played for the school's varsity baseball team three years, while also playing basketball for four years. Skirka then enrolled at the Kellogg Community College, to play college baseball for the Kellogg Bruins baseball team.

As a freshman at Kellogg Community College in 2004, Skirka had a .273 batting average with 8 RBIs.

As a sophomore in 2005, Skirka batted .358 with 2 home runs, and 35 RBIs.

In the 2006 season as a junior, Skirka accepted a scholarship offer to Grand Valley State University. Skirka won the starting shortstop job for the Lakers. He hit scored 56 runs, while hitting .322 with a .432 on-base percentage (OBP) and 28 RBIs.

Skirka had his best season as a senior in 2007, hitting a career high in doubles (14), triples (5), home runs (7), RBIs (43), batting average (.400) and slugging (.631). He was named First Team All-Great Lakes Intercollegiate Athletic Conference, Rawlings/American Baseball Coaches Association (ABCA) All-Region honors and a CoSIDA Academica All-Region selection.

== Coaching career ==
In 2008, Skirka began his coaching career as an assistant at Grand Rapids Community College. In 2009, Skirka was named an assistant for the Ouachita Baptist University. In 2010, Skirka moved on to Murray State University as an assistant coach. Skirka spent two seasons as the first base coach, before moving to third base coach and working with outfielders and hitters. In 2015, Skirka became the recruiting coordinator for the Walters State Community College baseball team.

On July 2, 2018, Skirka returned to Murray State as the head coach of the baseball program.

In 2025, Skirka led Murray State to the Missouri Valley Conference regular season and tournament championships, securing the Racers' first bid to the NCAA Tournament since 2003 and their fourth in school history. Murray State proceeded to upset regional host Ole Miss to win their first-ever regional championship, which was followed by a Super Regional victory over Duke to punch the Racers' first-ever ticket to the College World Series. Skirka's squad also set a school record for victories (44).

== Head coaching record ==
Statistics overview
Season	Team	Overall	Conference	Standing	Postseason
Murray State Racers (Ohio Valley Conference) (2019–2022)
2019	Murray State	24–30	16–14	T–5th	Ohio Valley Tournament
2020	Murray State	10–7	2–1		Season canceled due to COVID-19
2021	Murray State	33–25	18–12	2nd	Ohio Valley Tournament
2022	Murray State	30–25	11–13	7th	Ohio Valley Tournament
Murray State:			47–40 (OVC)		
Murray State Racers (Missouri Valley Conference) (2023–present)
2023	Murray State	31–28	14–13	5th	MVC Tournament
2024	Murray State	37–20	17–10	2nd	MVC Tournament
2025	Murray State	44–17	17–8	T–1st	College World Series
Murray State:		206–151	48–31 (MVC)		
Total:		206–151			
National champion Postseason invitational champion Conference regular season champion Conference regular season and conference tournament champion Division regular season champion Division regular season and conference tournament champion Conference tournament champion

== See also ==
- List of current NCAA Division I baseball coaches
